= Alexander Wendt =

American political scientist

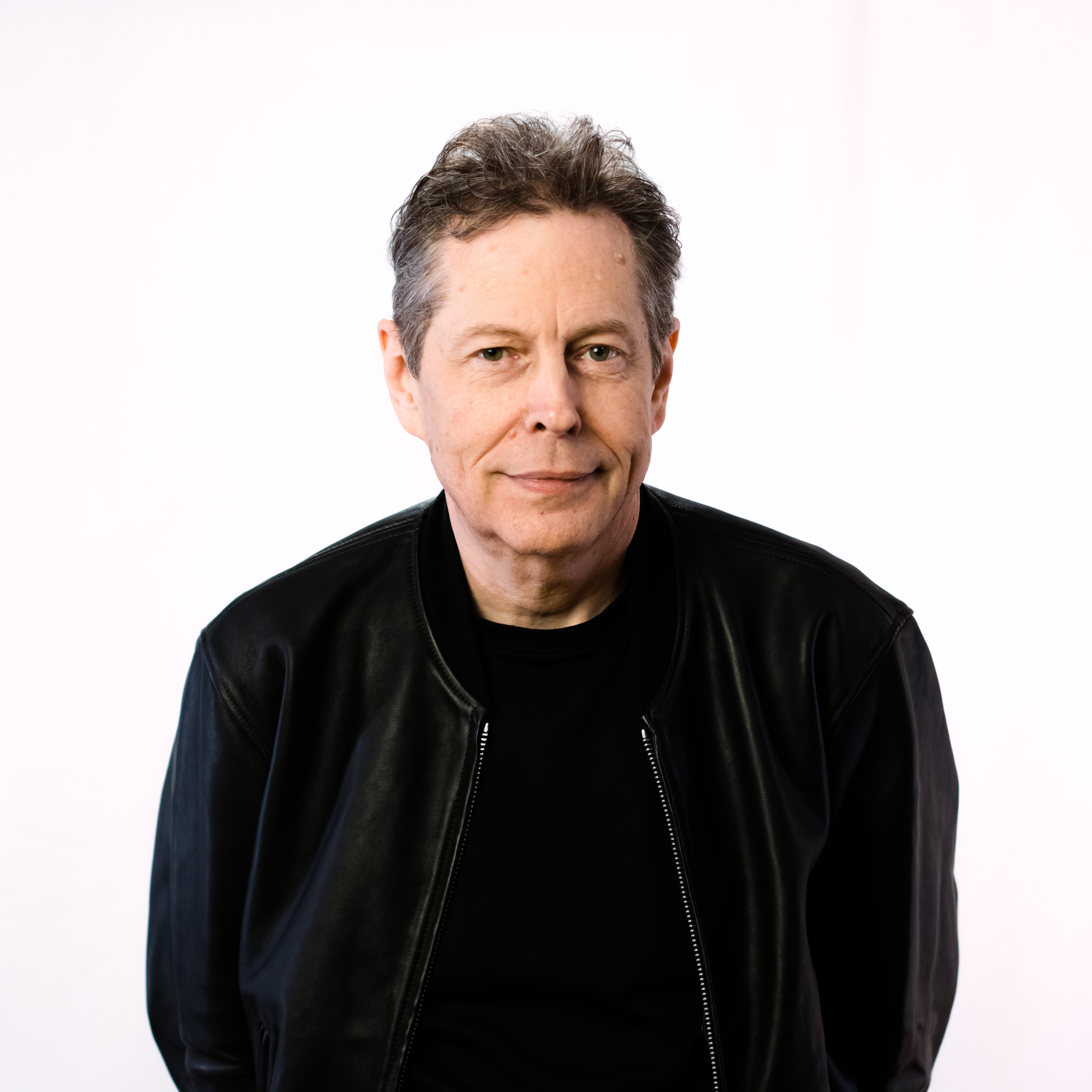
- Born: 12 June 1958 (age 68); Mainz, West Germany
- Citizenship: American
- Education: University of Minnesota, Macalester College
- Known for: Constructivism
- Awards: Johan Skytte Prize in Political Science (2023); Elected to the American Academy of Arts and Sciences (2025)
- Scientific career
- Fields: International relations, political science
- Workplaces: The Ohio State University, University of Chicago, Dartmouth College, Yale University
- Doctoral advisor: Raymond Duvall

Alexander Wendt (born 12 June 1958) is an American political scientist and a founding figure of social constructivism in the field of international relations, and a key contributor to quantum social science. Wendt and academics such as Nicholas Onuf, Peter J. Katzenstein, Emanuel Adler, Michael Barnett, Kathryn Sikkink, John Ruggie, Martha Finnemore, Ted Hopf and others have, within a relatively short period, established constructivism as one of the major schools of thought in the field.

A 2017 Teaching, Research, and International Policy (TRIP) survey of 1,400 international relations scholars worldwide ranked Wendt as the most influential scholar in the field over the past 20 years. Earlier TRIP surveys in 2006 and 2011 also recognized his work as among the most impactful in the discipline. Wendt’s scholarship has garnered over 50,000 citations on Google Scholar, making him one of the most cited researchers in international relations, alongside figures like Joseph Nye and James Fearon.

== Biography ==
Alexander Wendt was born in 1958 in Mainz in West Germany. His father, Dr. Hans Werner Wendt, served in the Third Reich’s DAK (Deutsches Afrikakorps) commanded by Gen. Erwin Rommel during World War Two. Alexander attended high school in St. Paul, Minnesota and studied political science and philosophy at Macalester College before receiving his Ph.D. in political science from the University of Minnesota in 1989, studying under Raymond "Bud" Duvall. Wendt taught at Yale University from 1989 to 1997, at Dartmouth College from 1997 to 1999, at the University of Chicago from 1999 to 2004, and is currently the Ralph D. Mershon Professor of International Security at the Ohio State University. Wendt was elected to the American Academy of Arts and Sciences in 2025. Wendt was formerly married to Prof. Jennifer Mitzen (Ph.D., University of Chicago). They filed for divorce in 2021.

== Social Theory of International Politics ==
Wendt's most widely cited work to date is Social Theory of International Politics (Cambridge University Press, 1999), which builds on and goes beyond his 1992 article "Anarchy is What States Make of It". Social Theory of International Politics places itself as a response to Kenneth Waltz's 1979 work, Theory of International Politics, the canonical text of the neorealist school with Wendt centering states as the object of study and replicating Waltz's division between international relations and foreign policy. Like Waltz, Wendt believed that the actual production that individuates states happens through domestic processes that require a separate theory from international relations; thus: "Much of the construction is at the domestic level, as Liberals have emphasized, and a complete theory of state identity needs to have a domestic component."

Wendt's book advances an argument of critical realism, and the ontological and methodological claims of constructivism. Critical realism, drawing upon the work of Roy Bhaskar (amongst others), seeks to explain un-observables within the world and constitutive questions of the world.

Constructivism, as imagined by Wendt, builds upon the work of Nicholas Onuf and Anthony Giddens, and argues for the mutual constitution of agents and structures, the historical contingency of cultures of anarchy, the role of constitutive and regulative norms in state behavior, the role of intersubjective social structures in identity, and the power of ideas. Anarchy, for Wendt, "has no logic apart from process and that interaction is structured, albeit not at a macro-level." There are three empirical cultures of anarchy in international relations: Hobbesian (where enmity dominates), Lockean (where rivalry dominates), and Kantian (where friendship dominates).

== Quantum Mind and Social Science ==
In Quantum Mind and Social Science (Cambridge University Press, 2015), Wendt proposes a synthesis of quantum physics and social theory, arguing that consciousness and social phenomena exhibit quantum-like properties. The book has sparked significant debate, with philosopher Steve Fuller describing it as "the most intellectually challenging work of social ontology published in my career." While some scholars, such as Colin Wight, remain skeptical, others, including quantum physicists and philosophers, have praised its interdisciplinary ambition.

== Current work: UAP and National Security ==
Since 2008, Wendt has researched UAP (UFOs) and their implications for national security. His article "Sovereignty and the UFO" (Political Theory, 2008) challenges conventional assumptions about state sovereignty in the context of unexplained aerial phenomena. A forthcoming book, The Last Humans: UFOs and National Security (Oxford University Press), expands on this work, examining the potential societal and political impacts of UAP.

== Awards and honors ==
- International Studies Association "Best Book of the Decade" Award (2006) for Social Theory of International Politics.
- Johan Skytte Prize in Political Science (2023, shared with Martha Finnemore) for "fundamentally reshaping the understanding of international politics through constructivist theory."
- Elected to the American Academy of Arts and Sciences (2025).

== Works by Wendt ==
=== Books ===
- Social Theory of International Politics, Cambridge University Press, 1999, ISBN 0-521-46960-0
- Quantum Mind and Social Science Unifying Physical and Social Ontology, Cambridge University Press, 2015, ISBN 9781107442924
- Der Derian, James; Wendt, Alexander. Quantum International Relations: A Human Science for World Politics. Oxford University Press, 2022. ISBN 9780197568217.
- The Last Humans: UFOs and National Security (forthcoming, Oxford University Press).

=== Chapters in edited volumes ===
- "Norms, Identity and Culture in National Security" 1996 (with Ronald Jepperson and Peter Katzenstein), in Katzenstein, ed., The Culture of National Security, New York: Columbia University Press, pp. 33–75.
- "What is IR For?: Notes Toward a Post-Critical View," 2000 in Richard Wyn Jones, ed., Critical Theory and World Politics, Boulder: Lynne Rienner, pp. 205–224.
- "Rationalism v. Constructivism: A Skeptical View." 2002 (with James Fearon) In Handbook of International Relations, edited by W. Carlsnaes, T. Risse, and B. Simmons. London: Sage.
- "'Social Theory' as Cartesian Science: An Auto-Critique from a Quantum Perspective." 2006 In Constructivism and International Relations, edited by Stefano Guzzini and Anna Leander. London: Routledge.

=== Selected articles ===
- Wendt, Alexander E. (July 1987). "The agent-structure problem in international relations theory". International Organization. 41 (3): 335–370. doi:10.1017/S002081830002751X. ISSN 1531-5088.
- Wendt, Alexander (1992). "Anarchy is what States Make of it: The Social Construction of Power Politics". International Organization. 46 (2): 391–425. doi:10.1017/S0020818300027764. ISSN 0020-8183. JSTOR 2706858.
- Wendt, Alexander (1995). "Constructing International Politics". International Security. 20 (1): 71–81. doi:10.2307/2539217. ISSN 0162-2889. JSTOR 2539217.
- Wendt, Alexander (2001). "Driving with the Rearview Mirror: On the Rational Science of Institutional Design". International Organization. 55 (4): 1019–1049. doi:10.1162/002081801317193682. ISSN 1531-5088.
- Wendt, Alexander (1 December 2003). "Why a World State is Inevitable". European Journal of International Relations. 9 (4): 491–542. doi:10.1177/135406610394001.
- Wendt, Alexander (1 August 2008). "Sovereignty and the UFO". Political Theory. 36 (4): 607–633. doi:10.1177/0090591708317902. hdl:1811/30159.

=== As editor ===
In 2009, Wendt co-founded the journal International Theory with Duncan Snidal. From 2009 to 2019, he served as co-editor of the journal, with Christian Reus-Smit joining as a co-editor in 2014. Published by Cambridge University Press.
