= Social norm =

Informal understanding of acceptable conduct

A social norm or norm is a shared standard of acceptable behavior by a group. Social norms can both be informal understandings that govern the behavior of members of a society, as well as be codified into rules and laws. Social normative influences or social norms, are deemed to be powerful drivers of human behavioural changes and well organized and incorporated by major theories which explain human behaviour. Institutions are composed of multiple norms. Norms are shared social beliefs about behavior; thus, they are distinct from "ideas", "attitudes", and "values", which can be held privately, and which do not necessarily concern behavior. Norms are contingent on context, social group, and historical circumstances.

Scholars distinguish between regulative norms (which constrain behavior), constitutive norms (which shape interests), and prescriptive norms (which prescribe what actors ought to do). The effects of norms can be determined by a logic of appropriateness and logic of consequences; the former entails that actors follow norms because it is socially appropriate, and the latter entails that actors follow norms because of cost-benefit calculations. Others see social norms emerging as part of an evolutionarily stable strategy, where they stabilize through third-party punishment.

Norms can have strong effects on human behavior and can promote social control across many cultures. Those who do not conform with social norms are considered "deviants." The life cycle of a norm occurs in three stages: (1) Norm emergence – norm entrepreneurs seek to persuade others of the desirability and appropriateness of certain behaviors; (2) Norm cascade – when a norm obtains broad acceptance; and (3) Norm internalization – when a norm acquires a "taken-for-granted" quality. Norms are robust to various degrees: some norms are often violated whereas other norms are so deeply internalized that violations are infrequent. Evidence for the existence of norms can be detected in the patterns of behavior within and across social groups, as well as their articulation in group discourse.

Many disciplines study norms, including sociologists, psychologists, political scientists, and economists. Within and across these disciplines, academics study several types of norms, including political norms and gender norms.

== Definition ==
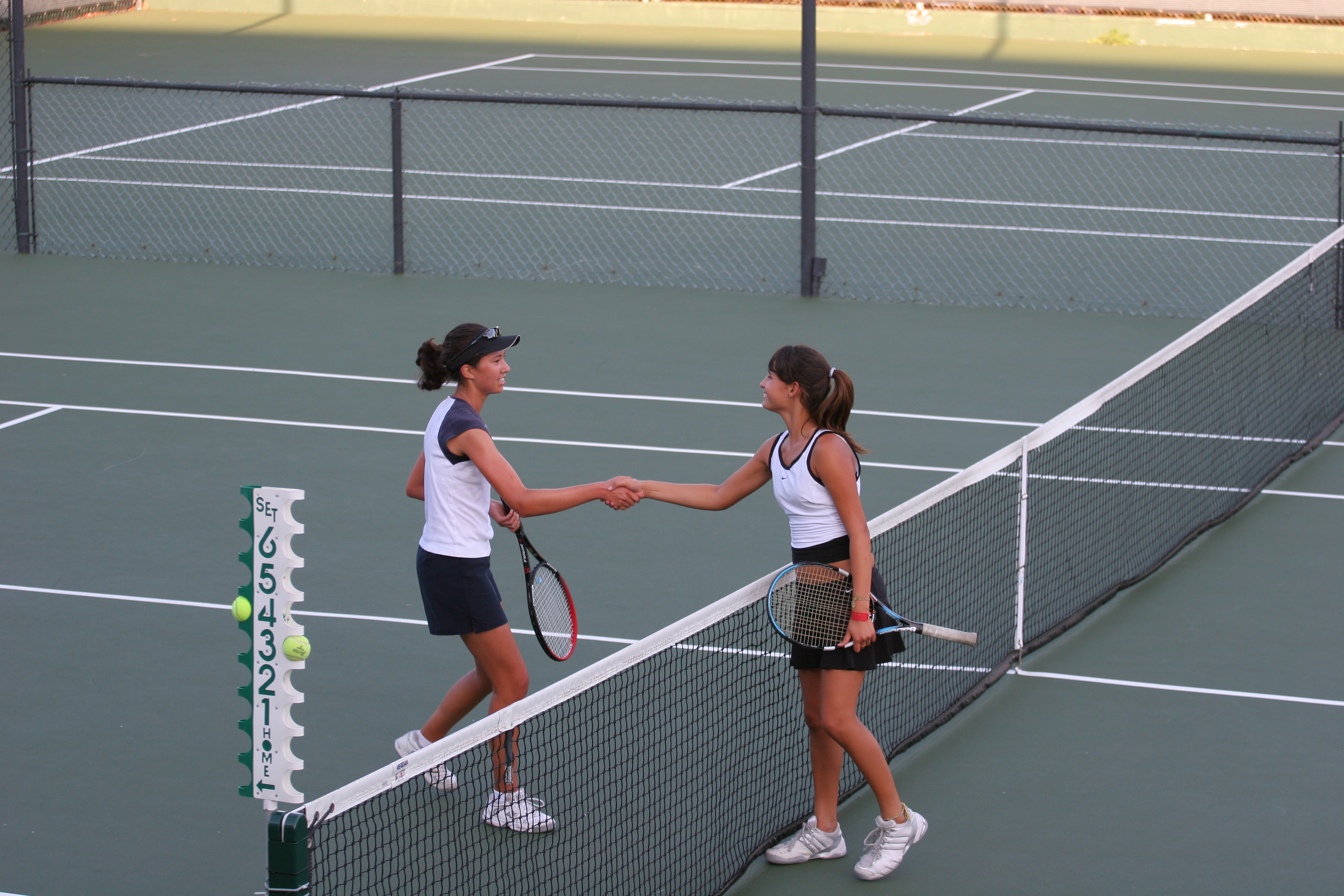
Shaking hands after a sports match is an example of a social norm.

There are varied definitions of social norms, but there is agreement among scholars that norms are:

1. social and shared among members of a group
2. related to behaviors and shape decision-making
3. proscriptive or prescriptive
4. socially acceptable ways of living by a group of people in a society

In 1965, Jack P. Gibbs identified three basic normative dimensions that all concepts of norms could be subsumed under:

1. "a collective evaluation of behavior in terms of what it ought to be"
2. "a collective expectation as to what behavior will be"
3. "particular reactions to behavior" (including attempts to sanction or induce certain conduct)

According to Ronald Jepperson, Peter Katzenstein and Alexander Wendt, "norms are collective expectations about proper behavior for a given identity." Wayne Sandholtz argues against this definition, as he writes that shared expectations are an effect of norms, not an intrinsic quality of norms. Sandholtz, Martha Finnemore and Kathryn Sikkink define norms instead as "standards of appropriate behavior for actors with a given identity." In this definition, norms have an "oughtness" quality to them.

Michael Hechter and Karl-Dieter Opp define norms as "cultural phenomena that prescribe and proscribe behavior in specific circumstances." Sociologists Christine Horne and Stefanie Mollborn define norms as "group-level evaluations of behavior." This entails that norms are widespread expectations of social approval or disapproval of behavior. Scholars debate whether social norms are individual constructs or collective constructs.

Economist and game theorist Peyton Young defines norms as "patterns of behavior that are self-enforcing within a group." He emphasizes that norms are driven by shared expectations: "Everyone conforms, everyone is expected to conform, and everyone wants to conform when they expect everyone else to conform." He characterizes norms as devices that "coordinate people's expectations in interactions that possess multiple equilibria."

Philosopher Cristina Bicchieri defines norms as rules that one follows if others around them also follow these rules. Following norms is based on an individual's empirical expectations ("what I believe everyone else is doing") and an individual's normative expectations ("what I believe everyone else believes I should or ought to do"). Norms can be descriptive. When a collective behavior is motivated by empirical expectations, it is considered a descriptive norm. When it is motivated by normative expectations it is considered a social norm.

There is disagreement about whether concepts such as "conventions", "customs", "morals", "mores", "rules", and "laws" have been characterized as equivalent to norms. Institutions can be considered collections or clusters of multiple norms. Rules and norms are not necessarily distinct phenomena: both are standards of conduct that can have varying levels of specificity and formality. Laws are a highly formal version of norms. Laws, rules and norms may be at odds; for example, a law may prohibit something but norms still allow it. Norms are not equivalent to an aggregation of individual attitudes. Ideas, attitudes and values are not necessarily norms, as these concepts do not necessarily concern behavior and may be held privately. "Prevalent behaviors" and behavioral regularities are not necessarily norms. Instinctual or biological reactions, personal tastes, and personal habits are not necessarily norms.

== Emergence and transmission ==
Groups may adopt norms in a variety of ways.

Some stable and self-reinforcing norms may emerge spontaneously without conscious human design. Peyton Young goes as far as to say that "norms typically evolve without top-down direction...through interactions of individuals rather than by design." Norms may develop informally, emerging gradually as a result of repeated use of discretionary stimuli to control behavior. Not necessarily laws set in writing, informal norms represent generally accepted and widely sanctioned routines that people follow in everyday life. These informal norms, if broken, may not invite formal legal punishments or sanctions, but instead encourage reprimands, warnings, or othering; incest, for example, is generally thought of as wrong in society, but many jurisdictions do not legally prohibit it.

Norms may also be created and advanced through conscious human design by norm entrepreneurs. Norms can arise formally, where groups explicitly outline and implement behavioral expectations. Legal norms typically arise from design. A large number of these norms we follow 'naturally' such as driving on the right side of the road in the US and on the left side in the UK, or not speeding in order to avoid a ticket.

Martha Finnemore and Kathryn Sikkink identify three stages in the life cycle of a norm:

1. Norm emergence: Norm entrepreneurs seek to persuade others to adopt their ideas about what is desirable and appropriate.
2. Norm cascade: When a norm has broad acceptance and reaches a tipping point, with norm leaders pressuring others to adopt and adhere to the norm.
3. Norm internalization: When the norm has acquired a "taken-for-granted" quality where compliance with the norm is nearly automatic.

They argue that several factors may raise the influence of certain norms:

- Legitimation: Actors that feel insecure about their status and reputation may be more likely to embrace norms.
- Prominence: Norms that are held by actors seen as desirable and successful are more likely to diffuse to others.
- Intrinsic qualities of the norm: Norms that are specific, long-lasting, and universal are more likely to become prominent.
- Path dependency: Norms that are related to preexisting norms are more likely to be widely accepted.
- World time-context: Systemic shocks (such as wars, revolutions and economic crises) may motivate a search for new norms.

Christina Horne and Stefanie Mollborn have identified two broad categories of arguments for the emergence of norms:

1. Consequentialism: norms are created when an individual's behavior has consequences and externalities for other members of the group.
2. Relationalism: norms are created because people want to attract positive social reactions. In other words, norms do not necessarily contribute to the collective good.

Per consequentialism, norms contribute to the collective good. However, per relationalism, norms do not necessarily contribute to the collective good; norms may even be harmful to the collective.

Some scholars have characterized norms as essentially unstable, thus creating possibilities for norm change. According to Wayne Sandholtz, actors are more likely to persuade others to modify existing norms if they possess power, can reference existing foundational meta-norms, and can reference precedents. Social closeness between actors has been characterized as a key component in sustaining social norms.

=== Transfer of norms between groups ===
Individuals may also import norms from a previous organization to their new group, which can get adopted over time. Without a clear indication of how to act, people typically rely on their history to determine the best course forward; what was successful before may serve them well again. In a group, individuals may all import different histories or scripts about appropriate behaviors; common experience over time will lead the group to define as a whole its take on the right action, usually with the integration of several members' schemas. Under the importation paradigm, norm formation occurs subtly and swiftly whereas with formal or informal development of norms may take longer.

Groups internalize norms by accepting them as reasonable and proper standards for behavior within the group. Once firmly established, a norm becomes a part of the group's operational structure and hence more difficult to change. While possible for newcomers to a group to change its norms, it is much more likely that the new individual will adopt the group's norms, values, and perspectives, rather than the other way around.

== Deviance from social norms ==
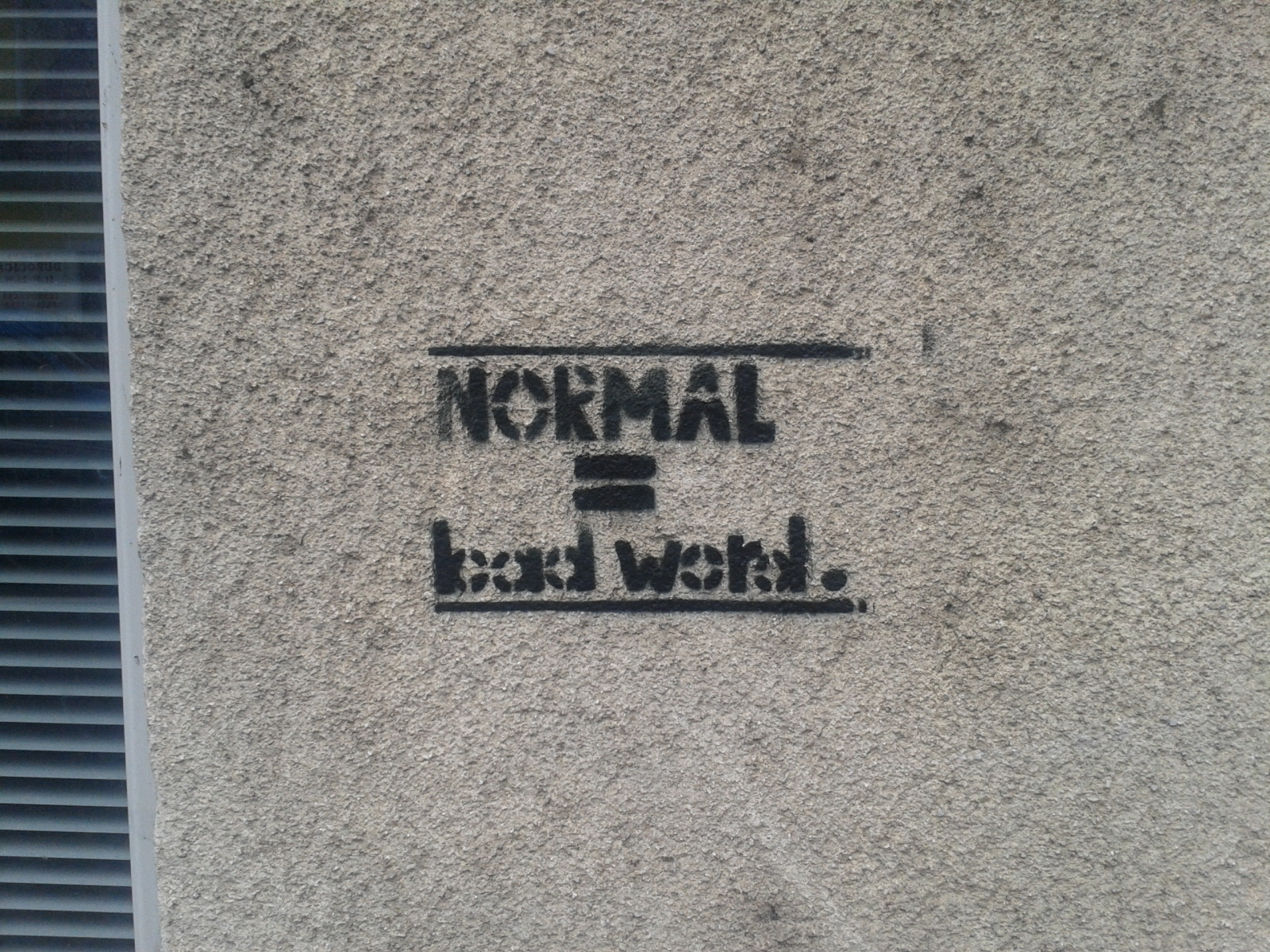
"Normal = bad word", a graffiti in Ljubljana, Slovenia

Deviance is defined as "nonconformity to a set of norms that are accepted by a significant number of people in a community or society" More simply put, if group members do not follow a norm, they become tagged as a deviant. In the sociological literature, this can often lead to them being considered outcasts of society. Yet, deviant behavior amongst children is somewhat expected. Except the idea of this deviance manifesting as a criminal action, the social tolerance given in the example of the child is quickly withdrawn against the criminal. Crime is considered one of the most extreme forms of deviancy according to scholar Clifford R. Shaw.

What is considered "normal" is relative to the location of the culture in which the social interaction is taking place. In psychology, an individual who routinely disobeys group norms runs the risk of turning into the "institutionalized deviant." Similar to the sociological definition, institutionalized deviants may be judged by other group members for their failure to adhere to norms. At first, group members may increase pressure on a non-conformist, attempting to engage the individual in conversation or explicate why he or she should follow their behavioral expectations. The role in which one decides on whether or not to behave is largely determined on how their actions will affect others. Especially with new members who perhaps do not know any better, groups may use discretionary stimuli to bring an individual's behavior back into line. Over time, however, if members continue to disobey, the group will give-up on them as a lost cause; while the group may not necessarily revoke their membership, they may give them only superficial consideration. If a worker is late to a meeting, for example, violating the office norm of punctuality, a supervisor or other co-worker may wait for the individual to arrive and pull him aside later to ask what happened. If the behavior continues, eventually the group may begin meetings without him since the individual "is always late." The group generalizes the individual's disobedience and promptly dismisses it, thereby reducing the member's influence and footing in future group disagreements.

Group tolerance for deviation varies across membership; not all group members receive the same treatment for norm violations. Individuals may build up a "reserve" of good behavior through conformity, which they can borrow against later. These idiosyncrasy credits provide a theoretical currency for understanding variations in group behavioral expectations. A teacher, for example, may more easily forgive a straight-A student for misbehaving—who has past "good credit" saved up—than a repeatedly disruptive student. While past performance can help build idiosyncrasy credits, some group members have a higher balance to start with. Individuals can import idiosyncrasy credits from another group; childhood movie stars, for example, who enroll in college, may experience more leeway in adopting school norms than other incoming freshmen. Finally, leaders or individuals in other high-status positions may begin with more credits and appear to be "above the rules" at times. Even their idiosyncrasy credits are not bottomless, however; while held to a more lenient standard than the average member, leaders may still face group rejection if their disobedience becomes too extreme.

Deviance also causes multiple emotions one experiences when going against a norm. One of those emotions widely attributed to deviance is guilt. Guilt is connected to the ethics of duty which in turn becomes a primary object of moral obligation. Guilt is followed by an action that is questioned after its doing. It can be described as something negative to the self as well as a negative state of feeling. Used in both instances, it is both an unpleasant feeling as well as a form of self-punishment. Using the metaphor of "dirty hands", it is the staining or tainting of oneself and therefore having to self cleanse away the filth. It is a form of reparation that confronts oneself as well as submitting to the possibility of anger and punishment from others. Guilt is a point in both action and feeling that acts as a stimulus for further "honorable" actions.

A 2023 study found that non-industrial societies varied in their punishments of norm violations. Punishment varied based on the types of norm violations and the socio-economic system of the society. The study "found evidence that reputational punishment was associated with egalitarianism and the absence of food storage; material punishment was associated with the presence of food storage; physical punishment was moderately associated with greater dependence on hunting; and execution punishment was moderately associated with social stratification."

== Behavior ==
Whereas ideas in general do not necessarily have behavioral implications, Martha Finnemore notes that "norms by definition concern behavior. One could say that they are collectively held ideas about behavior."

Norms running counter to the behaviors of the overarching society or culture may be transmitted and maintained within small subgroups of society. For example, Crandall (1988) noted that certain groups (e.g., cheerleading squads, dance troupes, sports teams, sororities) have a rate of bulimia, a publicly recognized life-threatening disease, that is much higher than society as a whole. Social norms have a way of maintaining order and organizing groups.

In the field of social psychology, the roles of norms are emphasized—which can guide behavior in a certain situation or environment as "mental representations of appropriate behavior". It has been shown that normative messages can promote pro-social behavior, including decreasing alcohol use, increasing voter turnout, and reducing energy use. According to the psychological definition of social norms' behavioral component, norms have two dimensions: how much a behavior is exhibited, and how much the group approves of that behavior.

== Social control ==
Although not considered to be formal laws within society, norms still work to promote a great deal of social control. They are statements that regulate conduct. The cultural phenomenon that is the norm is the prescriber of acceptable behavior in specific instances. Ranging in variations depending on culture, race, religion, and geographical location, it is the foundation of the terms some know as acceptable as not to injure others, the golden rule, and to keep promises that have been pledged. Without them, there would be a world without consensus, common ground, or restrictions. Even though the law and a state's legislation is not intended to control social norms, society and the law are inherently linked and one dictates the other. This is why it has been said that the language used in some legislation is controlling and dictating for what should or should not be accepted. For example, the criminalization of familial sexual relations is said to protect those that are vulnerable, however even consenting adults cannot have sexual relationships with their relatives. The language surrounding these laws conveys the message that such acts are supposedly immoral and should be condemned, even though there is no actual victim in these consenting relationships.

Social norms can be enforced formally (e.g., through sanctions) or informally (e.g., through body language and non-verbal communication cues). Because individuals often derive physical or psychological resources from group membership, groups are said to control discretionary stimuli; groups can withhold or give out more resources in response to members' adherence to group norms, effectively controlling member behavior through rewards and operant conditioning. Social psychology research has found the more an individual values group-controlled resources or the more an individual sees group membership as central to his definition of self, the more likely he is to conform. Social norms also allow an individual to assess what behaviors the group deems important to its existence or survival, since they represent a codification of belief; groups generally do not punish members or create norms over actions which they care little about. Norms in every culture create conformity that allows for people to become socialized to the culture in which they live.

As social beings, individuals learn when and where it is appropriate to say certain things, to use certain words, to discuss certain topics or wear certain clothes, and when it is not. Thus, knowledge about cultural norms is important for impressions, which is an individual's regulation of their nonverbal behavior. One also comes to know through experience what types of people they can and cannot discuss certain topics with or wear certain types of dress around. Typically, this knowledge is derived through experience (i.e. social norms are learned through social interaction). Wearing a suit to a job interview in order to give a great first impression represents a common example of a social norm in the white collar work force.

In his work "Order without Law: How Neighbors Settle Disputes", Robert Ellickson studies various interactions between members of neighbourhoods and communities to show how societal norms create order within a small group of people. He argues that, in a small community or neighborhood, many rules and disputes can be settled without a central governing body simply by the interactions within these communities.

== Sociology ==
In sociology, norms are seen as rules that bind an individual's actions to a specific sanction in one of two forms: a punishment or a reward. Through regulation of behavior, social norms create unique patterns that allow for distinguishing characteristics to be made between social systems. This creates a boundary that allows for a differentiation between those that belong in a specific social setting and those that do not.

Research in social psychology distinguishes between descriptive norms (what people commonly do) and injunctive norms (what people ought to do). In a field experiment at Petrified Forest National Park, and colleagues found that signs emphasizing descriptive norms (e.g., "Many past visitors have removed petrified wood") inadvertently increased theft, whereas signs stating injunctive norms (e.g., "Please don't remove the petrified wood") reduced it. This demonstrates that norms can be leveraged for social influence, but the type of norm communicated matters critically for behavioral outcomes.

For Talcott Parsons of the functionalist school, norms dictate the interactions of people in all social encounters. On the other hand, Karl Marx believed that norms are used to promote the creation of roles in society which allows for people of different levels of social class structure to be able to function properly. Marx claims that this power dynamic creates social order. James Coleman used both micro and macro conditions for his theory. For Coleman, norms start out as goal oriented actions by actors on the micro level. If the benefits do not outweigh the costs of the action for the actors, then a social norm would emerge. The norm's effectiveness is then determined by its ability to enforce its sanctions against those who would not contribute to the "optimal social order."

Heinrich Popitz is convinced that the establishment of social norms, that make the future actions of alter foreseeable for ego, solves the problem of contingency (Niklas Luhmann). In this way, ego can count on those actions as if they would already have been performed and does not have to wait for their actual execution; social interaction is thus accelerated. Important factors in the standardization of behavior are sanctions and social roles.

=== Operant conditioning ===
The probability of these behaviours occurring again is discussed in the theories of B. F. Skinner, who states that operant conditioning plays a role in the process of social norm development. Operant conditioning is the process by which behaviours are changed as a function of their consequences. The probability that a behaviour will occur can be increased or decreased depending on the consequences of said behaviour.

In the case of social deviance, an individual who has gone against a norm will contact the negative contingencies associated with deviance, this may take the form of formal or informal rebuke, social isolation or censure, or more concrete punishments such as fines or imprisonment. If one reduces the deviant behavior after receiving a negative consequence, then they have learned via punishment. If they have engaged in a behavior consistent with a social norm after having an aversive stimulus reduced, then they have learned via negative reinforcement. Reinforcement increases behavior, while punishment decreases behavior.

As an example of this, consider a child who has painted on the walls of her house, if she has never done this before she may immediately seek a reaction from her mother or father. The form of reaction taken by the mother or father will affect whether the behaviour is likely to occur again in the future. If her parent is positive and approving of the behaviour it will likely reoccur (reinforcement) however, if the parent offers an aversive consequence (physical punishment, time-out, anger etc...) then the child is less likely to repeat the behaviour in future (punishment).

Skinner also states that humans are conditioned from a very young age on how to behave and how to act with those around us considering the outside influences of the society and location one is in. Built to blend into the ambiance and attitude around us, deviance is a frowned upon action.

== Focus theory of normative conduct ==
Cialdini, Reno, and Kallgren developed the focus theory of normative conduct to describe how individuals implicitly juggle multiple behavioral expectations at once. Expanding on conflicting prior beliefs about whether cultural, situational or personal norms motivate action, the researchers suggested the focus of an individual's attention will dictate what behavioral expectation they follow.

== Types ==
There is no clear consensus on how the term norm should be used.

Martha Finnemore and Kathryn Sikkink distinguish between three types of norms:

1. Regulative norms: they "order and constrain behavior"
2. Constitutive norms: they "create new actors, interests, or categories of action"
3. Evaluative and prescriptive norms: they have an "oughtness" quality to them

Finnemore, Sikkink, Jeffrey W. Legro and others have argued that the robustness (or effectiveness) of norms can be measured by factors such as:

- The specificity of the norm: norms that are clear and specific are more likely to be effective
- The longevity of the norm: norms with a history are more likely to be effective
- The universality of the norm: norms that make general claims (rather than localized and particularistic claims) are more likely to be effective
- The prominence of the norm: norms that are widely accepted among powerful actors are more likely to be effective

Christine Horne argues that the robustness of a norm is shaped by the degree of support for the actors who sanction deviant behaviors; she refers to norms regulating how to enforce norms as "metanorms." According to Beth G. Simmons and Hyeran Jo, diversity of support for a norm can be a strong indicator of robustness. They add that institutionalization of a norm raises its robustness. It has also been posited that norms that exist within broader clusters of distinct but mutually reinforcing norms may be more robust.

Jeffrey Checkel argues that there are two common types of explanations for the efficacy of norms:

- Rationalism: actors comply with norms due to coercion, cost-benefit calculations, and material incentives
- Constructivism: actors comply with norms due to social learning and socialization

According to Peyton Young, mechanisms that support normative behavior include:

- Coordination
- Social pressure
- Signaling
- Focal points

=== Descriptive versus injunctive ===
We can differentiate between descriptive and injunctive norms in different ways. One way is based on why people follow a norm. As discussed in the definition section, following norms is based on an individual's empirical expectations ("what I believe everyone else is doing") and an individual's normative expectations ("what I believe everyone else believes I should or ought to do"). Norms can be descriptive. When a collective behavior is motivated by empirical expectations, it is considered a descriptive norm. When it is motivated by normative expectations it is considered a social norm.

Another way to differentiate is via the content of the norm itself. Descriptive norms depict what happens, while injunctive norms describe what should happen. Cialdini, Reno, and Kallgren (1990) define a descriptive norm as people's perceptions of what is commonly done in specific situations; it signifies what most people do, without assigning judgment. The absence of trash on the ground in a parking lot, for example, transmits the descriptive norm that most people there do not litter. An Injunctive norm, on the other hand, transmits group approval about a particular behavior; it dictates how an individual should behave. Watching another person pick up trash off the ground and throw it out, a group member may pick up on the injunctive norm that he ought not to litter.

=== Prescriptive and proscriptive norms ===
Prescriptive norms are unwritten rules that are understood and followed by society and indicate what we should do. Expressing gratitude or writing a Thank You card when someone gives you a gift represents a prescriptive norm in American culture. Proscriptive norms, in contrast, comprise the other end of the same spectrum; they are similarly society's unwritten rules about what one should not do. These norms can vary between cultures; while kissing someone you just met on the cheek is an acceptable greeting in some European countries, in the United States this is not acceptable, and thus represents a proscriptive norm.

=== Subjective norms ===
Subjective norms are determined by beliefs about the extent to which important others want a person to perform a behavior. When combined with attitude toward behavior, subjective norms shape an individual's intentions. Social influences are conceptualized in terms of the pressure that people perceive from important others to perform, or not to perform, a behavior. Social Psychologist Icek Azjen theorized that subjective norms are determined by the strength of a given normative belief and further weighted by the significance of a social referent, as represented in the following equation: SN ∝ Σn_{i}m_{i ,} where (n) is a normative belief and (m) is the motivation to comply with said belief.

== Mathematical representations ==
Over the last few decades, several theorists have attempted to explain social norms from a more theoretical point of view. By quantifying behavioral expectations graphically or attempting to plot the logic behind adherence, theorists hoped to be able to predict whether or not individuals would conform. The return potential model and game theory provide a slightly more economic conceptualization of norms, suggesting individuals can calculate the cost or benefit behind possible behavioral outcomes. Under these theoretical frameworks, choosing to obey or violate norms becomes a more deliberate, quantifiable decision.

=== Return potential model ===
Figure 1. The return potential model (reproduced from Jackson, 1965).

Developed in the 1960s, the return potential model provides a method for plotting and visualizing group norms. In the regular coordinate plane, the amount of behavior exhibited is plotted on the X-axis (label a in Figure 1) while the amount of group acceptance or approval gets plotted on the Y-axis (b in Figure 1). The graph represents the potential return or positive outcome to an individual for a given behavioral norm. Theoretically, one could plot a point for each increment of behavior how much the group likes or dislikes that action. For example, it may be the case that among first-year graduate students, strong social norms exist around how many daily cups of coffee a student drinks. If the return curve in Figure 1 correctly displays the example social norm, we can see that if someone drinks 0 cups of coffee a day, the group strongly disapproves. The group disapproves of the behavior of any member who drinks fewer than four cups of coffee a day; the group disapproves of drinking more than seven cups, shown by the approval curve dipping back below zero. As seen in this example, the return potential model displays how much group approval one can expect for each increment of behavior.

- Point of maximum return. The point with the greatest y-coordinate is called the point of maximum return, as it represents the amount of behavior the group likes the best. While c in Figure 1 is labeling the return curve in general, the highlighted point just above it at X=6, represents the point of maximum return. Extending our above example, the point of maximum return for first-year graduate students would be 6 cups of coffee; they receive the most social approval for drinking exactly that many cups. Any more or any fewer cups would decrease the approval.
- Range of tolerable behavior. Label d represents the range of tolerable behavior, or the amount of action the group finds acceptable. It encompasses all the positive area under the curve. In Figure 1, the range of tolerable behavior extends is 3, as the group approves of all behavior from 4 to 7 and 7-4=3. Carrying over our coffee example again, we can see that first-years only approve of having a limited number of cups of coffee (between 4 and 7); more than 7 cups or fewer than 4 would fall outside the range of tolerable behavior. Norms can have a narrower or wider range of tolerable behavior. Typically, a narrower range of behavior indicates a behavior with greater consequences to the group.
- Intensity. The intensity of the norm tells how much the group cares about the norm, or how much group affect is at stake to be won or lost. It is represented in the return potential model by the total amount of area subsumed by the curve, regardless of whether the area is positive or negative. A norm with low intensity would not vary far from the x-axis; the amount of approval or disapproval for given behaviors would be closer to zero. A high-intensity norm, however, would have more extreme approval ratings. In Figure 1, the intensity of the norm appears high, as few behaviors invoke a rating of indifference.
- Crystallization. Finally, norm crystallization refers to how much variance exists within the curve; translated from the theoretical back to the actual norm, it shows how much agreement exists between group members about the approval for a given amount of behavior. It may be that some members believe the norm more central to group functioning than others. A group norm like how many cups of coffee first years should drink would probably have low crystallization since a lot of individuals have varying beliefs about the appropriate amount of caffeine to imbibe; in contrast, the norm of not plagiarizing another student's work would likely have high crystallization, as people uniformly agree on the behavior's unacceptability. Showing the overall group norm, the return potential model in Figure 1 does not indicate the crystallization. However, a return potential model that plotted individual data points alongside the cumulative norm could demonstrate the variance and allow us to deduce crystallization.

=== Game theory ===
Another general formal framework that can be used to represent the essential elements of the social situation surrounding a norm is the repeated game of game theory. Rational choice, a branch of game theory, deals with the relations and actions socially committed among rational agents. A norm gives a person a rule of thumb for how they should behave. However, a rational person acts according to the rule only if it is beneficial for them. The situation can be described as follows. A norm gives an expectation of how other people act in a given situation (macro). A person acts optimally given the expectation (micro). For a norm to be stable, people's actions must reconstitute the expectation without change (micro-macro feedback loop). A set of such correct stable expectations is known as a Nash equilibrium. Thus, a stable norm must constitute a Nash equilibrium. In the Nash equilibrium, no one actor has any positive incentive in individually deviating from a certain action. Social norms will be implemented if the actions of that specific norm come into agreement by the support of the Nash equilibrium in the majority of the game theoretical approaches.

From a game-theoretical point of view, there are two explanations for the vast variety of norms that exist throughout the world. One is the difference in games. Different parts of the world may give different environmental contexts and different people may have different values, which may result in a difference in games. The other is equilibrium selection not explicable by the game itself. Equilibrium selection is closely related to coordination. For a simple example, driving is common throughout the world, but in some countries people drive on the right and in other countries people drive on the left (see coordination game). A framework called comparative institutional analysis is proposed to deal with the game theoretical structural understanding of the variety of social norms.

== Political norms ==
Political norms can be defined as social norms that specify which political views and behaviors are accepted from specific groups at a certain time. One area of research in political norms is related to turning out to vote. Several experimental studies show that social pressure gets citizens to the polls. One such study is tied explicitly to the empirical expectations (i.e., "what I believe everyone else is doing") around descriptive norms. In a field experiment in the United States, Gerber and Rodgers show that voters are more motivated to vote when they learn that many of those around them are voting. That is, manipulating their empirical expectations change their behavior. This is evidence that descriptive norms matter for politics. Other studies about turnout emphasize normative expectations (i.e., "what I believe everyone else believes I should or ought to do") to show that when an individual shares partisanship with someone, they are more likely to have normative expectations about whether and how that person should vote. These studies about social pressure are aligned with the idea that political norms are typically enforced by third-party social reactions rather than that of legal coercion from democracies.

Research by Alvarez-Benjumea and Valentim shows that when observers see a political action that they consider to be "counternormative" (openly supporting a controversial topic), they are more likely to socially punish the violator. This can make breaking the norm more costly than if they were to simply follow it, leading people to want to conform rather than accepting negative consequences. These negative consequences can be both direct and indirect. Some direct acts include verbal or physical confrontation while indirect acts are more that of gossip, avoidance, or refusing cooperation. Indirect punishments are more common because they aren't as risky, but they can still harm the persons reputation. Some people will hide their true political beliefs to avoid such punishments, even if it creates a gap between what they believe and what they choose to express. Across a study of three European countries, researchers have found that voters may not vote for policies that they agree with if the parties that enact those policies violate political norms.This is particularly the case for women in Sweden and the UK, who do not vote for radical right parties despite policy alignment. Different types of people tend to enforce political norms. Women and more educated individuals are less likely to use direct sanctions while if a controversial party has strong local support, people are less likely to indirectly punish. Overall, political norms can change over time and acceptable norms are always being redefined.

Political norms are a subset of social norms, but they have more to do with governance, authority, and decision-making. Both voters and politicians can alter political norms. While social norms apply to every-day life, political norms are more narrowly defined to how political institutions and their actors function. They define what kinds of behaviors leaders, citizens, and organizations consider to be legitimate. Things like respecting election outcomes, following constitutional guidelines, or engaging in political discourse are all included in such behaviors. Political norms often come from social norms of a community so that cultural attitudes reshape what is socially acceptable as political behavior. Political norms can also reinforce or challenge the values that are incentivized by the public. This allows a system that is predictable and allows power and conflict to be negotiated.

Jon Elster's definitions of political norms emphasizes that even though they may be unwritten, they are still powerful in their ability to structure constitutional and political behavior, alongside formal laws. He separates them into two distinct types, strategic norms and non-strategic norms. Strategic norms function to be equilibrium behaviors that are shaped by the expectations of others. Non-strategic norms are legal, moral, and social rules that guide behavior without thinking about strategic outcomes. Elster relates political norms to constitutional conventions that shape practices like power-sharing, institutional restraint, and the use of public resources even when there is not an enforced punishment for breaking them. These norms inform political actors of how they should act and their power is derived from shared morals, habits, and social pressure rather than legal enforcement.

== Gender norms ==
There is a large amount of research about social norms as they relate to gender roles, also known as gender norms. These relate to how individuals who belong to specific gender groups are expected to behave. Gender norms, among other factors, have been used to explain inequality between sexes. One such gender norm is patrilineality, where property and inheritance is passed down through male family members. This incentivizes individuals to have sons, which can account for the inequality in the number of births of girls versus boys. This is related to the widely known phenomena on missing women. Despite much research on the constraints that gender norms bring, gender norms are not always conceptualized as constraints, especially in the realm of feminist economics.

Gender norms can also explain women's political participation. Researchers have compared matrilineal communities, where inheritance and property passes down through generations via women. There is evidence that matrilineal women are more likely to participate in politics compared to patrilineal women across both African and Indian tribes.

== See also ==
- Anomie
- Breaching experiment
- Conformity
- Convention (norm)
- Cool (aesthetic)
- Dress code
- Enculturation
- Etiquette
- Heteronormativity
- Ideal (ethics)
- Ideology
- Norm (philosophy)
- Norm of reciprocity
- Normality (behavior)
- Normalization (sociology)
- Other (philosophy)
- Peer pressure
- Rule complex
- Social norms marketing
- Social structure
- Taboo
