= Friedrich Kratochwil =

Czech politics academic (born 1944)

Friedrich V. Kratochwil (b. 1944) is a prominent scholar in the field of International Relations (IR), known for his contributions to constructivism and his focus on norms, rules, and the processes of social construction in international politics. His work emphasizes the role of language, meaning, and social practices in shaping international relations, offering a counterpoint to traditional rationalist and materialist perspectives in IR.

== History ==
Kratochwil was born in Lundenburg (former Czechoslovakia). After graduating in 1963 from the humanistic Maximiliansgymnasium in Munich, he studied philosophy, history and political science at LMU Munich. He received in 1969 his university degree (M.A.) in International Relations from Georgetown University in Washington, D.C. In 1976, he received his doctorate (Ph.D.) from Princeton University in political science with a focus on international relations.

Kratochwil taught at American universities in Princeton, Columbia, Pennsylvania and at the European University Institute in Florence. Until 2003, Friedrich Kratochwil was Professor of International Politics at the Geschwister-Scholl-Institut (GSI) of LMU Munich.

One of his famous books is Rules, Norms and Decisions (1989), introducing constructivism to the discipline, a landmark study in the discipline of international relations.

He has been the editor of the European Journal of International Relations and member of the editorial boards of several journals, including the Journal of International Relations of the Asia-Pacific, International Studies Quarterly, International Organization, World Politics, and member of the editorial advisory board of Millennium: Journal of International Studies.

== Books ==
- International Order and Foreign Policy (Boulder, Colo.: Westview Press, 1978).
- The Humean Conception of International Relations, Center for International Studies, Princeton University, Princeton, N.J., 1981.
- International Law: A Contemporary Perspective (Boulder, Colo., Westview Press, 1985) co-edited with Richard Falk, Princeton University, and Saul Mendlovitz, Rutgers Law School.
- Peace and Disputed Sovereignty, Reflections on Conflict over Territory (Lanham, MD: University Press of America, 1985), co-authored with Paul Rohrlich and Harpreet Mahajan.
- Rules, Norms and Decisions, On the Conditions of Practical and Legal Reasoning in International Relations and Domestic Society (Cambridge: Cambridge University Press, 1989), Paperback edition March 1991.
- International Organization: A Reader (together with Ed Mansfield, eds. (New York: HarperCollins, 1993).
- The Return of Culture and Identity in IR Theory (editor, with Yosef Lapid), Boulder, Colo.: Lynne Rienner, 1996.
- Transformative Change and Global Order (editor, with Doris Fuchs), LIT Verlag, 2002
- International Organization and Global Governance: A Reader, Friedrich Kratochwil and Edward D. Mansfield (eds.), Pearson Longman, Second Edition, 2005
- The Status of Law in World Society: Mediations on the Role and Rule of Law. Cambridge: Cambridge University Press, 2014.
- Praxis: On Acting and Knowing. Cambridge: Cambridge University Press, 2018.

== Articles ==
- "Politik und Politische Wissenschaft", Zeitschrift für Politik, vol. 18 (1971), no. 2, pp. 113–23.
- "Strukturfunktionalismus und Methodologische Probleme der Politischen Entwicklungslehre, Zeitschrift für Politik, vol. 19 (1972), no. 1, pp. 32–48.
- "Amerika, hast du es besser?", Zeitschrift für Politik, vol. 20 (1972), no. 1, pp. 73–81.
- "Alternative Criteria for Evaluating Foreign Policy", International Interaction, vol. 8 (Summer, 1981), pp. 105–22.
- "On the Notion of ‘Interest’ in International Relations", International Organization, vol. 36, no. 1 (Winter, 1982), pp. 1–30.
- "Is International Law ‘Proper Law’?", Archiv für Rechts- und Sozialphilosophie, (Archives for Philosophy of LAW AND Social Philosophy), vol. 69, Heft 1, 1983, pp. 13-46.
- "Thrasymmachos Revisited: On the Relevance of Norms and the Study of Law for International Relations", Journal of International Affairs (Winter, 1983), pp. 343–356.
- "Errors have their Advantages", International Organization, vol. 38, no. 1 (Winter, 1984), pp. 305–320.
- "The Force of Prescriptions", International Organization, vol. 38 (Fall, 1984), pp. 685–708.
- "Rethinking the Sources of International Law", Columbia Journal of Transnational Law, vol. 23 (1985), pp. 705–712.
- "The Role of Domestic Courts as Agencies of the International Legal Order", in: Falk, Kratochwil, Mendlovitz (eds.), International Law, A Contemporary Perspective, (Boulder, Colo.: Westview, 1985), ch. 13, pp. 236–263.
- "Of Law and Human Action: A Jurisprudential Plea for a World Order Perspective in International Legal Studies", in: Falk, Kratochwil, Mendlovitz (eds.), International Law, op.cit., ch. 37, 639–650.
- "The State of the Art, or the Art of the State", together with John Ruggie, International Organization, vol. 40 (1986), pp. 753–76; Routledge Volumes, vol. 2 (2000), pp. 753–75.
- "Of Systems and Boundaries, Reflections on the Formation of the State System", World Politics, vol. 39 (Fall, 1986), pp. 27–52.
- "Strukturfunktionalismus und methodologische Probleme der politischen Entwicklungslehre", in: Franz Nuscheler (ed.), Politikwissenschaftliche Entwicklungsländerforschung, Wege der Forschung, vol. 379 (Darmstadt, Ger.: Wissenschaftliche Buchgesellschaft, 1986), pp. 74–98. (reprinted from Zeitschrift für Politik, vol. 19 (1972).
- "Norms and Values: Rethinking the Domestic Analogy", Ethics and International Affairs, vol. 1 (1987), pp. 135–159.
- "Rules, Norms, Values and the Limits of ‘Rationality’", Archiv für Rechts- und Sozialphilosophie, vol. 73 (1987), p. 301-329.
- "Diritto e Principi di Natura: Pufendorf e le Leggi di Natura come Condizioni Transcendentali di un Discorso sulle Dispute“, Teoria Politica (Italy), vol. 4 (1988), pp. 3–27.
- "Regimes, Interpretation and the ‘Science’ of Politics", Millennium, vol. 17 (1988), pp. 263–284.
- "Protagorean Quest: Community, Justice, and the ‘Oughts and Musts’ of International Politics“, International Journal, vol. 43, No. 2, 1988, p. 205–240.
- "International Organization: The State of the Art", with John Ruggie, in: Paul Diehl (ed.), The Politics of International Organizations: Patterns and Insights, (Chicago, Il., Dorsey Press, 1989), pp. 17–27.
- "The Challenge of Security in a Changing World", Journal of International Affairs, vol. 43 (Summer/Fall, 1989), pp. 119–141.
- "On the Relevance of Norms and the Study of Law for International Relations", in: Peter A. Toma, Robert Gorman (eds.), International Relations: Understanding Global Issues (Pacific Grove, Calif.: Brooks-Cole Publishers, 1990), ch. 10; abridged reprint from „Thrasymmachus Revisited", Journal of International Affairs, vol. 37 (Winter, 1984).
- "International Order and Individual Liberty", Constitutional Political Economy, vol. 3, No. 1 (1992), pp. 39–50.
- "The Embarrassment of Changes: Neo-Realism as the Science of Realpolitik without Politics", Review of International Studies, vol. 19 (1993), pp. 1–18.
- "Norms vs. Numbers, Multilateralism and the Rationalist and Reflexivist Approaches to Institutions, A Unilateral Plea for Communicative Rationality", in: John G. Ruggie (ed.), Multilateralism Matters (New York: Columbia University Press, 1993), chapter 11.
- "Constitutional Thought vs. Value-based Thought in World Order Studies", in:Richard Falk, Robert Johansen, Samuel Kim (eds.), The Constitutional Foundations of World Peace (Albany: State University of New York Press, 1993, chapter 11).
- "Medieval Tales: Neorealist ‘Science’ and the Abuse of History", (together with Rodney Hall), International Organization, vol. 47, no. 3 (Summer, 1993), pp. 479–92.
- "Contract and Regimes“, in: Volker Rittberger (ed.), Regime Theory and International Relations (Oxford, Engl.: Clarendon Press, 1993), chapter 4. "Understanding Change in International Politics: The Soviet empire’s demise and the international system" (together with Rey Koslowski), International Organization (Spring, 1994), vol. 48, no. 2, pp. 215–248.
- "The Limits of Contract", European Journal of International Law, vol. 5 (no. 4, 1994), pp. 465–91.
- "The Limits of Contract", reprinted in: Law and Moral Action in World Politics, Cecelia Lynch, Michael Loriaux (eds.), (University of Minnesota Press, 2000), pp. 24–53.
- "Citizenship: On the Border of Order?", in: Alternatives vol. 19, no. 4 (Fall, 1994), pp. 485–506.
- "Changing Relations between State, Market, and Society, and the Problem of Knowledge", Pacific Focus, vol. 9 (Fall, 1994), pp. 43–60.
- "Sovereignty as ‘Dominium’; Is there a Right of Humanitarian Intervention?", in: Michael Mastanduno, Gene Lyons (eds.), Beyond Westphalia? National Sovereignty and International Intervention (Baltimore, MD.: Johns Hopkins Univ.Press, 1995), chapter 2.
- "Was wissen wir über den Wandel der Beziehungen zwischen Staat, Markt und Gesellschaft?", Welttrends, No 7 (1995), pp. 114–132.
- "Why Sisyphus is Happy: Reflections on the ‘Third Debate’ and on Theorizing as a Vocation", The Seyjong Review vol. 3 (1995), pp. 3–36.
- "Revisiting the „National“: Toward an Identity Agenda in Neorealism?", in: Yosef Lapid, Friedrich Kratochwil (eds.), Nationalism, Citizenship and Identity (Boulder, Colo.: Lynne Riener Publ., 1995), pp. 105-128.
- "Citizenship: On the Border of Order?", in: Friedrich Kratochwil, Yosef Lapid (eds.), Nationalism, Citizenship and Identity (Boulder, Colo.: Lynne Riener, Publ. 1995), pp. 181–197, (reprint from Alternatives vol. 19, no. 4 (Fall, 1994).
- "Is the Ship of Culture at Sea or Returning?", in: together with Yosef Lapid (ed.), Nationalism, Citizenship and Identity (Boulder, Colo.: Lynne Riener Publ., 1996), pp. 201–222.
- "Globalization and the Disappearance of ‘Publics’", in: Jin-Young Chung (ed.), Global Governance; The Role of International Institutions in A Changing World (Seoul: Sejong Institute, 1997), chapter 4. „Awakening or Somnambulation“, in Millennium, vol. 26, No. 2, 1997, pp. 1–6.
- "Politics, Norms, and Peaceful Change", Review of International Studies, vol. 24 (1998), pp. 193–218, reprinted also in Tim Dunne, Michael Cox, Ken Booth (eds.), The Eighty Years’ Crisis, Cambridge, England: Cambridge University Press, (1998), pp. 193–218.
- "Acción y Conocimiento Histórico: La Construcción de Teorías de las Relaciones Internácionales“, Foro Internácional, vol. XXXIX-4 (1999), pp. 588–610.
- "How Do Norms Matter?" in: Michael Byers (ed.), The Role of Law in International Politics (Oxford: Oxford University Press, 2000), pp. 35–68. „Theory and Political Practice: Reflections on Theory-Building in International Relations" in: Principled World Politics; The Challenge of Normative International Relations (Paul Wapner, Lester Edwin J. Ruiz, eds.): Lanham, MD: Rowman & Littlefield Publishers, Inc. (2000), pp. 50–64.
- "Constructing a New Orthodoxy? Wendt’s ‘Social Theory of International Politics’ and the Constructivist Challenge" in: Millennium (2000), vol. 29, no. 1, pp. 73–101.
- "The Politics of Place and Origin: An Inquiry into the Changing Boundaries of Representation, Citizenship, and Legitimacy" in: Beverly Neufeld, Michi Ebata (eds.): Confronting the Political in International Relations (London: MacMillan, 2000/New York: St. Martin's Press, 2000), chapter 8, pp. 185–211; in: International Relations of the Asia-Pacific (Oxford University Press, 2001), vol. 1, no. 1, pp. 143–165.
- "Constructivism as an Approach to Interdisciplinary Study", in: Karin M. Fierke/Knud Erik Joergensen (eds.), Constructing International Relations, the next generation (Armonk, N.Y./London: M.E. Sharpe, 2001), chapt. 1, pp. 13–35.
- "International law as an approach to international ethics: A plea for a jurisprudential diagnostics" Jean-Marc Coicaud, Daniel Warner (eds.): Ethics and International Affairs (Tokyo: United Nations University Press, 2001), chapt. 2, pp. 14–41.
- "Conclusion", in: Friedrich Kratochwil/Mathias Albert/David Jacobson/Yosef Lapid (eds.), Identities, Borders, Orders: New Directions in IR Theory (Minneapolis/London: University of Minnesota Press, 2001).
- "Reflexivity: Method and Evidence" (T. Hopf/F. V. Kratochwil/R.N. Lebow) in: International Encyclopedia of the Social & Behavioral Sciences (Elsevier Science Ltd., Oxford, 2001), 12884-12888
- "Souveränität und Moderne. Eine begriffliche Analyse des semantischen Feldes" in: Markus Jachtenfuchs/Michèle Knodt (Hrsg.): Regieren in internationalen Institutionen (Leske + Budrich, Opladen, 2002), S. 29-51
- "Globalization: What It Is and What It Is Not. Some critical reflections on the discursive formations dealing with transformative change" in: Doris A. Fuchs/Friedrich Kratochwil (eds.), Transformative Change and Global Order (LIT Verlag 2002), S. 25-44
- "11. September: Das Ende des Hobbesischen Projekts?", in: Neue Bedrohung Terrorismus. Der 11. September 2001 und die Folgen (Sammelband), Ellen Box, Antje Helmerich (Hrsg.), Lit Verlag Münster, 2003, S. 109–25.
- "Moles, Martyrs and Sleepers. The End of the Hobbesian Project?" Ethnologia Europaea 33:2:57-68, 2003
- "The ‘Legalization’ of World Politics?" Leiden Journal of International Law, Vol 16, December 2003: 878-84, 2003
- "Religion and (Inter-)National Politics: On th Heuristics of Identities, Structures, and Agents, Alternatives", 30 (2005), 113-140

== Other works ==
- An Evaluation of the CACI/CIA Modell for Long Range Strategic Forecasting (Arlington, Va.: Computer Science Corp., 1978).
- „The Problem of Measurement and Explanation in the Social Sciences“, Letter Report to the Department of Defense, Computer Science Corp., December 15, 1978.
- Book review of Cornelius Murphy, Jr., The Search for World Order (Dordrecht-Boston: Martinus Nijhoff Publ., 1985), American Journal of International Law, vol. 81, no. 3 (1987), pp. 780–82.
- Book review of Barry Buzan, Charles Jones, Richard Little, The Logic of Anarchy (New York: Columbia University Press, 1993), American Political Science Review, vol. 88, No. 1 (March 1994), pp. 249–251.
- „Which Role for Germany? Reflections on the ‘Nation mit Null Bock’“, Thyssen Lectures, Georgetown University, 1996.
- „Kreatives Chaos: Überlegungen zur Reformierbarkeit komplexer sozialer Systeme“, Aviso, vol. 4 (1997), pp. 23 bis 27.
