= Rodney Bruce Hall =

Rodney Bruce Hall (born 1960, Marshalltown, Iowa, United States) is an American Professor of International Relations and among those scholars known as Second Generation Constructivists. He earned bachelor's and master's degrees in physics and subsequently a master's degree in international relations and a PhD in political science from the University of Pennsylvania under the supervision of Friedrich Kratochwil, one of the founding scholars of constructivism in international relations.

== History ==
Hall taught for two years as a Postdoctoral Fellow in International Relations Theory at the Watson Institute for International Studies at Brown University, Providence, Rhode Island, and for four years at the University of Iowa. He migrated to Britain as University Lecturer in International Political Economy in 2003. He was tenured in that position and taught at Oxford for ten years from 2003 to 2013. At Oxford Hall served as Academic Director of the Oxford University Foreign Service Programme as a member of the Faculty of Oxford's Department of International Development, Queen Elizabeth House. There he developed the MSc in Global Governance and Diplomacy (MSc GGD). He was the founding Course Director of the MSc GGD and directed or taught on the course from 2006 to 2013. In 2013 he left Oxford University for a professorial position as Professor of International Relations at the University of Macau, Macau (S.A.R.), China. He has served on the editorial boards of International Studies Quarterly and Oxford Development Studies. He has contributed to the literature on constructivism in international relations across sub-disciplines with books and articles covering the sub-disciplines of security studies, international organization / global governance, international political economy and debates within international relations theory.

== Books ==
Reducing Armed Violence with NGO Governance(Editor) (London and New York: Routledge, 2014) ISBN 978-0-415-83133-8

With Oliver Kessler, Cecelia Lynch and Nicholas Onuf (Eds.), On Rules, Politics, and Knowledge: Friedrich Kratochwil, International Relations, and Domestic Affairs(Houndmills, Basingstoke: Palgrave, 2010) ISBN 0-2302-4604-4

Central Banking as Global Governance: Constructing Financial Credibility [Cambridge Studies in International Relations No. 109] (Cambridge: Cambridge University Press, 2008) ISBN 978-0-521-72721-1

With Thomas J. Biersteker (Eds.) The Emergence of Private Authority in Global Governance : [Cambridge Studies in International Relations No. 85] (Cambridge: Cambridge University Press, 2002) ISBN 978-0-521-52337-0

National Collective Identity: Social Constructs and International Systems (New York: Columbia University Press, 1999) ISBN 978-0-231-11151-5

== Articles ==
”Intersubjective Expectations and Performativity in Global Financial Governance” International Political Sociology 3 (2009): 453-457.

“The New Alliance Between the Mob and Capital (and the State)” St Antony’s International Review (STAIR) 5 (1) (April 2009): 11-26.

“Social Money, Central Banking and Constitutive Rules of the International Monetary System”, Revista da Procuradoria-Geral do Banco Central Brasil 2 (1)(June 2008): 15-56.

“Explaining ‘Market Authority’ and Liberal Stability: Toward a Sociological-Constructivist Synthesis” Global Society 21 (3) (July 2007): 319-345.

“Human Nature as Behavior and Action in Economics and International Relations Theory” Journal of International Relations and Development 9 (3) (September 2006): 269-287.

“Private Authority: Non-State Actors and Global Governance” Harvard International Review (Summer 2005): 66-70.

Hall, Rodney Bruce, “The Discursive Demolition of the Asian Development Model” International Studies Quarterly 47 (1) (March 2003): 71-99

With Thomas J. Biersteker,“Gouvernement privé dans le système international” (“Private Governance in the International System”) in L’Economie politique N. 11, Quatrième Trimestre (2001): 5-18

“Constructing Collective Identity Discursively: Applications of the “Self/Other” Nexus in International Relations” International Studies Review 3 (1) (Spring 2001): 101-111.

With Thomas J. Biersteker, “L’emergence des autorites privees” (“The Emergence of Private Authorities) Alternative Economiques 17 (1) (Premier Trimestre 2001): 17-19.

“Nationalism, War and Security” in Alexander J. Motyl (ed.) Encyclopedia of Nationalism (San Diego: Academic Press / Harcourt. 2000) pp. 869–882.

“Territorial and National Sovereigns: Sovereign Identity and Consequences for Security Policy” Security Studies, Vol. 8, No. 2, (Winter 1998/99) pp. 145–97.

"Moral Authority as a Power Resource", International Organization, Vol. 51, No. 4., 1997, pp. 591–622.

With Friedrich V. Kratochwil, "Medieval Tales: Neorealist 'Science' and the Abuse of History", International Organization, Vol. 47, No. 3. 1993, pp. 479–91.

== Other works ==
“NGO Governance and Armed Violence” in Rodney Bruce Hall (ed.) Reducing Armed Violence with NGO Governance (London and New York: Routledge, 2014): 1-13.

With Christopher Marc Lilyblad, “Private Authority, Sociological Legitimacy and NGO Governance” in Rodney Bruce Hall (ed.) Reducing Armed Violence with NGO Governance (London and New York: Routledge, 2014): 75-93.

With Christopher Marc Lilyblad, “Prospects and Challenges for NGO Governance” in Rodney Bruce Hall (ed.) Reducing Armed Violence with NGO Governance (London and New York: Routledge, 2014): 235-240.

“Constructivism” in Thomas G. Weiss and Rorden Wilkinson (eds.) International Organization and Global Governance (London and New York: Routledge, 2013): 144-156.

“‘Trust me, I promise!’: Kratochwil's Contributions towards the Explanation of the Structure of Normative Social Relations” in Oliver Kessler, Rodney Bruce Hall, Cecelia Lynch and Nicholas Onuf (eds.), On Rules, Politics, and Knowledge: Friedrich Kratochwil, International Relations, and Domestic Affairs (Houndmills, Basingstoke: Palgrave, 2010): 60-73.

With Oliver Kessler, Cecelia Lynch and Nicholas Onuf, “On Rules: Introduction” in Oliver Kessler, Rodney Bruce Hall, Cecelia Lynch and Nicholas Onuf (eds.), On Rules, Politics, and Knowledge: Friedrich Kratochwil, International Relations, and Domestic Affairs (Houndmills, Basingstoke: Palgrave, 2010): 1-19.

“International Institutions: Responses to Transformations in Social Identity” in The Dynamics of Global Society: Theory and Prospects, Marui Yoshinori, Anno Tadashi, and David Wank (eds.) (Tokyo: Sophia University Press, 2007) Chapter published in the Japanese language.

“International Institutional Responses to Transformations in Social Identity: Liberal Globalization and the Re-Construction of Community” AGLOS News 5 (November 2004): 34-41.

With Thomas J. Biersteker. “The Emergence of Private Authority in the International System” in Rodney Bruce Hall and Thomas J. Biersteker (eds.) The Emergence of Private Authority in Global Governance (Cambridge, U.K.: Cambridge University Press, 2002): 3-22

With Thomas J. Biersteker “Private Authority as Global Governance” in Rodney Bruce Hall and Thomas J. Biersteker (eds.) The Emergence of Private Authority in Global Governance (Cambridge, U.K.: Cambridge University Press, 2002): 203-222.

“The Socially Constructed Contexts of Comparative Politics” in Daniel M. Green (ed.), Constructivist Comparative Politics: Theoretical Issues and Case Studies (London: M. E. Sharpe, 2002): 121-48.

“Territorial and National Sovereigns: Sovereign Identity and Consequences for Security Policy” in Glenn Chafetz, Michael Spirtas and Benjamin Frankel (eds.) The Origins of National Interests (London: Frank Cass, 1999): 145-97. (Reprint of the Security Studies piece).

"Collective Identity and Epochal Change in the International System," in Y. Yamamoto (ed.) Globalism, Regionalism, and Nationalism, (London: Blackwell, 1999): 45-69.

“shugo-teki aidentiti to kokusai shisutemu no daitenkan” or “Collective Identity and Epochal Change in the International System” (Minako Ichikawa trans.) in Japanese Association for International Relations (ed.) 21 seiki no nihon, ajia, sekai or Japan, Asia and Global System: Toward the Twenty-First Century (Tokyo: Kokusai Shoin Co. Ltd., 1998) pp. 159–93.
