= Dingding Chen =

Chinese political scientist

- 陈定定

Academic background
- Education: Renmin University of China; University of Chicago
- Thesis: Transformation from within: Chinese Agency and International Human Rights Norms, 1978--2005 (2007)

Academic work
- Institutions: Jinan University
- Main interests: Chinese foreign policy; Asian security; Human rights in China

Vice President of International Studies Association
- In office 2014–2018
- President: Amitav Acharya (2014–2015); Paul Diehl (2015–2016); T. V. Paul (2016–2017); Brett Ashley Leeds (2017–2018)

Dingding Chen (Chinese: 陈定定; pinyin: Chén Dìngdìng; born April 1975) is a Chinese political scientist whose research interests include Chinese foreign policy, Asian security, Chinese politics, and human rights. He is Professor of International Relations (IR) and Associate Dean of Institute for 21st Century Silk Road Studies at Jinan University, Guangzhou, China. He is a non-resident fellow at the Global Public Policy Institute (GPPi), a visiting researcher at Johns Hopkins University SAIS, a researcher at Center for Globalization, Tsinghua University, and the founding (in 2016) director of Intellisia Institute (海国图智研究院), a Chinese independent think tank focusing on international affairs. Since 2014, he has been a weekly contributor to The Diplomat magazine.

== Academic career ==
Chen holds a B.A. in International Economics from the Renmin University of China and an M.A. and Ph.D. in political science from the University of Chicago. Between 2005 and 2006, he was a visiting instructor in Government Department at Dartmouth College. Between 2006 and 2007, he was a Fellow at Harvard University. From 2009 to 2016, Chen was an assistant professor at the University of Macau where he teaches Chinese Politics and IR. From 2014 to 2018, he was a vice-president of International Studies Association (Asia Pacific region).

Chen is also an academic translator. He has translated Richard Ned Lebow's Why Nations Fight, Graham Allison's Destined for War, and Edward N. Luttwak's The Grand Strategy of the Byzantine Empire into Simplified Chinese.

== Publications ==
=== Monographs ===
- 让世界读懂中国 [Help the World Understand China] (World Affairs Press, 2019)

=== Single-edited books ===
- 国外智库看亚太经合组织(APEC) [On Asia-Pacific Economic Cooperation by Global Think Tanks] (Social Sciences Academic Press, 2017)

=== Co-edited books ===
- 人工智能与全球治理 [Artificial Intelligence and Global Governance] (Social Sciences Academic Press, 2020)
- 全球秩序 [Global Order] (Social Sciences Academic Press, 2018)
- International Engagement in China's Human Rights (Routledge, 2015)
- 国际关系中的预测 理论与实践 [International Relations Forecast: Theory and Practice] (Shanghai People's Press, 2014)
