= Rationalism (international relations) =

Theory of international relations

Rational choice (also termed rationalism) is a prominent framework in international relations scholarship. Rational choice is not a substantive theory of international politics, but rather a methodological approach that focuses on certain types of social explanation for phenomena. In that sense, it is similar to constructivism, and differs from liberalism and realism, which are substantive theories of world politics. Rationalist analyses have been used to substantiate realist theories, as well as liberal theories of international relations.

Rational choice research tends to explain conditions that bring about outcomes or patterns of behavior if relevant actors behave rationally. Key concepts in rational choice research in international relations include incomplete information, credibility, signaling, transaction costs, trust, and audience costs.

== Rational choice in international relations ==
According to James D. Fearon, a rational choice research project typically proceeds in the following fashion:

1. The analyst identifies an event or pattern of behavior that they want to explain
2. The analyst posits a set of relevant actors
3. The analyst proposes the choices available to the actors
4. The analyst links the preferences of actors to the set of available choices
5. The analyst explains the conditions under which an outcome occurs if the relevant actors are behaving rationally

Actors do not have to be fully rational. There are varieties of rationality (e.g. thick and thin rationality). Rational choice scholarship may emphasize materialist variables, but rational choice and materialism are not necessarily synonymous.

Rational choice explanations for conflict and the lack of cooperation in international politics frequently point to factors such as incomplete information, and a lack of credibility. Chances of cooperation and peaceful resolution can be increased through costly signaling, long shadows of the future, and tit-for-tat bargaining strategies. According to rationalist analyses, institutions may facilitate cooperation by increasing information, reducing transaction costs, and reducing collective action problems.

Rational choice analyses tend to conceptualize norms as adhering to a "logic of consequence" rather than the constructivist “logic of appropriateness”. The “logic of consequences” entails that actors are assumed to choose the most efficient means to reach their goals on the basis of a cost-benefit analysis. This stands in contrast to the logic of appropriateness whereby actors follow “internalized prescriptions of what is socially defined as normal, true, right, or good, without, or in spite of calculation of consequences and expected utility”. Jeffrey Checkel writes that there are two common types of explanations for the efficacy of norms:

- Rationalism: actors comply with norms due to coercion, cost-benefit calculations, and material incentives
- Constructivism: actors comply with norms due to social learning and socialization

=== Advantages ===
According to Duncan Snidal, the advantages of rational choice research is that the formalization of arguments helps to clarify the underlying logic of authors' claims, the clarity of arguments makes rational choice arguments falsifiable, and rational choice arguments lend themselves to empirical validation through case studies.

=== Limitations ===
Constructivist scholars argue that while rational choice approaches may be useful to explain the interactions of actors with given interests, rationalist approaches are ultimately limited in explaining how those interests emerged in the first place. In other words, rationalists use exogenously given interests, but struggle to account for endogenously given interests. According to Duncan Snidal, rationalists are good at explaining continuity and stability (equilibrium solutions), but are less adept at explaining why change occurs. He also argues that rationalists are ill-equipped to incorporate norms in their models. According to Sidney Verba, a rational choice model of international relations depends on the quality of assumptions in the model; bad assumptions undercut the usefulness and adequacy of the model.

International relations scholars who use methods and theories of psychology and cognitive science have criticized rational choice models of international relations.

== Bargaining model of war ==
In international relations theory, the bargaining model of war is a method of representing the potential gains and losses and ultimate outcome of war between two actors as a bargaining interaction. A central puzzle that motivates research in this vein is the "inefficiency puzzle of war": why do wars occur when it would be better for all parties involved to reach an agreement that goes short of war?

Thomas Schelling was an early proponent of formalizing conflicts as bargaining situations. Stanford University political scientist James Fearon brought prominence to the bargaining model in the 1990s. His 1995 article "Rationalist Explanations for War" is the most assigned journal article in International Relations graduate training at U.S. universities. The bargaining model of war has been described as "the dominant framework used in the study of war in the international relations field."

According to James D. Fearon, there are three conditions where war is possible under the bargaining model:

1. Uncertainty: An actor can overestimate his own abilities or the resolve of his opponent and start a war. This under- or overestimation is common throughout history. Hitler's invasion of the USSR in 1941 was motivated by the correct assumption that the Soviet forces were significantly weaker and worse organized than the German ones.
2. Commitment Problems: an actor has a difficulty to commit to not use military strength in the future. A first-strike advantage may force an actor to begin a preemptive war, or the threat of being attacked may cause an actor to start a preventive war.
3. Indivisibility of a good: if actors believe that a certain good could not be divided but only controlled in its entirety they may go to war.

In short, Fearon argues that a lack of information and bargaining indivisibilities can lead rational states into war. Robert Powell modified the model as presented by Fearon, arguing that three prominent kinds of commitment problems (preventive war, preemptive war, and bargaining failure over rising powers) tended to be caused by large and rapid shifts in the distribution of power. The fundamental cause for war in Powell's view is that actors cannot under those circumstances credibly commit to abide by any agreement. Powell also argued that bargaining indivisibilities were a form of commitment problem, as opposed to something that intrinsically prevented actors from reaching a bargain (because actors could reach an agreement over side payments over an indivisible good).

Applications of the bargaining model have indicated that third-party mediators can reduce the potential for war (by providing information). Some scholars have argued that democratic states can more credibly reveal their resolve because of the domestic costs that stem from making empty threats towards other states.

University of Pennsylvania political scientist Alex Weisiger has tackled the puzzle of prolonged wars, arguing that commitment problems can account for lengthy wars. Weisiger argues that "situational" commitment problems where one power is declining and preemptively attacks a rising power can be lengthy because the rising power believes that the declining power will not agree to any bargain. He also argues that "dispositional" commitment problems, whereby states will not accept anything except unconditional surrender (because they believe the other state will never abide by any bargain), can be lengthy.

Rochester University political scientist Hein Goemans argues that prolonged wars can be rational because actors in wars still have incentives to misrepresent their capabilities and resolve, both to be in a better position at the war settlement table and to affect interventions by third parties in the war. Actors may also raise or reduce their war aims once it becomes clear that they have the upper hand. Goemans also argues that it can be rational for leaders to "gamble for resurrection", which means that leaders become reluctant to settle wars if they believe they will be punished severely in domestic politics (e.g. punished through exile, imprisonment or death) if they do not outright win the war.

Building on canonical work by James Fearon, there are two prominent signaling mechanisms in the rational choice literature: sinking costs and tying hands. The former refers to signals that involve sunk irrecoverable costs, whereas the latter refers to signals that will incur costs in the future if the signaler reneges.

=== Limitations ===
The applicability of the bargaining model is limited by numerous factors, including:

- Cognitive factors: new information does not lead actors to change their beliefs or behaviors in a consistent way
- Domestic politics: leaders' aims in war are reflected by personal or domestic political interests rather than what is strictly in the state's interest
- Constructivism: the identities of actors are realized through conflict
- Multi-player bargaining: war can be an equilibrium solution to bargaining between more than two actors
- Divergent interpretations of identical information: two actors can interpret identical information differently
- Usefulness in individual cases: due to uncertainty, the model cannot explain the onset of war in individual cases

According to Robert Powell, the bargaining model has limitations in terms of explaining prolonged wars (because actors should quickly learn about the other side's commitment and capabilities). It can also give ahistorical readings of certain historical cases, as the implications of the model is that there would be no war between rational actors if the actors had perfect information. Ahsan Butt argues that in some wars, one actor is insistent on war and there are no plausible concessions that can be made by the other state.

Stephen Walt argues that while the bargaining model of war (as presented by Fearon) is an "insightful and intelligent" formalization of how a lack of information and commitment problems under anarchy can lead states into conflict, it is ultimately not a "new theoretical claim" but rather another way of expressing ideas that the likes of Robert Art, Robert Jervis and Kenneth Oye have previously presented.

Jonathan Kirshner has criticized the assumption of the bargaining model that states will reach a bargain if they have identical information. Kirshner notes that sports pundits have high-quality identical information available to them, yet they make different predictions about how sporting events will turn out. International politics is likely to be even more complicated to predict than sporting events.

According to Erik Gartzke, the bargaining model is useful for thinking probabilistically about international conflict, but the onset of any specific war is theoretically indeterminate.

=== Limitations of other rational choice scholarship ===
In a prominent 1999 critique of rational choice scholarship in security studies, Stephen Walt argued that a lot of rational choice research in security had limited originality, produced a lot of trivial results, and failed to empirically verify the validity of its theoretical claims. While he praised the logical consistency and precision of rational choice scholarship, he argued that formal modeling was not a prerequisite for logical consistency and precision. He added that rationalist models were limited in their empirical applicability due to the presence of multiple equilibria (i.e. folk theorem) and flaws in human updating. He criticized the shift in security studies research towards formal models, arguing that it added unnecessary complexity (which created an appearance of greater scientism) which forced scholars and student to invest time in reading rational choice scholarship and learning formal modeling skills when the time could be spent on more productive endeavors.

Rational choice scholars warn against conflating analytical assumptions in rational choice scholarship with empirical assumptions.

In terms of rationalist models in IPE scholarship, Martha Finnemore and Henry Farrell have raised questions about the strong relationship between rational choice models and quantitative methods, pointing out that qualitative methods may be more or equally suitable in empirical tests of rational choice models due to problems in quantitatively assessing strategic interactions.

According to Peter Katzenstein, Robert Keohane and Stephen Krasner, rational choice research is limited in the sense that it struggles to explain the sources of actors' preferences.

== Democratic peace theory ==
Rational choice scholarship has provided potential explanations for democratic peace theory, which is the notion that democracies are hesitant to engage in armed conflict with other identified democracies.

One prominent mechanism for the democratic theory is audience costs. An audience cost is a term in international relations theory that describes the electoral penalty a leader incurs from his or her constituency if they escalate a foreign policy crisis and are then seen as backing down. The term was popularized in a 1994 academic article by James Fearon where he argued that democracies carry greater audience costs than authoritarian states, which makes them better at signaling their intentions in interstate disputes. Branislav Slantchev has argued that the presence of a free media is a key component of audience costs.

Fearon's argument regarding the credibility of democratic states in disputes has been subject to debate among international relations scholars. Two studies 2001, using the MID and ICB datasets, provided empirical support for the notion that democracies were more likely to issue effective threats. There is survey experiment data that substantiates that specified threats induce audience costs, but also data with mixed findings.

A 2012 study by Alexander B. Downes and Todd S. Sechser found that existing datasets were not suitable to draw any conclusions as to whether democratic states issued more effective threats. They constructed their own dataset specifically for interstate military threats and outcomes, which found no relationship between regime type and effective threats. A 2017 study which recoded flaws in the MID dataset ultimately conclude, " that there are no regime-based differences in dispute reciprocation, and prior findings may be based largely on poorly coded data." A 2012 study by Marc Trachtenberg, which analyzed a dozen great power crises, found no evidence of the presence of audience costs in these crises.

Other scholars have disputed the democratic credibility argument, questioning its causal logic and empirical validity. Research by Jessica Weeks argued that some authoritarian regime types have similar audience costs as in democratic states. A 2014 study by Jessica Chen Weiss argued that the Chinese regime fomented or clamped down on nationalist (or anti-foreign) protests in China in order to signal resolve. Fomenting or permitting nationalist protests entail audience costs, as they make it harder for the Chinese regime to back down in a foreign policy crisis out of fear that the protestors turn against the regime.

Other rational choice scholars argue that the democratic peace is in part explained by the greater transparency of democratic political systems, which reduces the likelihood that states miscalculate the resolve of democratic states.

== Rational choice institutionalism ==
Rational Choice Institutionalism (RCI) is a theoretical approach to the study of institutions arguing that actors use institutions to maximize their utility, and that institutions affect rational individual behavior. This approach has been applied to the study of domestic institutions, as well as international institutions. In the institutionalist literature, RCI is one of the three prominent approaches, along with historical institutionalism and sociological institutionalism.

According to Erik Voeten, rational choice scholarship on international institutions can be divided between (1) rational functionalism and (2) Distributive rationalism. The former sees organizations as functional optimal solutions to collective problems, whereas the latter sees organizations as an outcome of actors' individual and collective goals. A prominent example of rational functionalism is the "Rational Design of International Institutions" literature.

Barbara Koremenos defines international cooperation as "any explicit arrangement – negotiated among international actors – that prescribes, proscribes, and/or authorizes behavior." She has provided a rationalist account for the design of international institutions, arguing, "because agreements matter, they are designed in rational ways, and the fact that people make efforts to design them in such ways corroborates their significance."

== Criticism ==
Proponents of emotional choice theory criticize rationalism by drawing on new findings from emotion research in psychology and neuroscience. They point out that the rationalist paradigm is generally based on the assumption that decision-making is a conscious and reflective process based on thoughts and beliefs. It presumes that people decide on the basis of calculation and deliberation. However, cumulative research in neuroscience suggests that only a small part of the brain's activities operate at the level of conscious reflection. The vast majority of its activities consist of unconscious appraisals and emotions. The significance of emotions in decision-making has generally been ignored by rationalism, according to these critics.

Moreover, emotional choice theorists contend that the rationalist paradigm has difficulty incorporating emotions into its models, because it cannot account for the social nature of emotions. Even though emotions are felt by individuals, psychologists and sociologists have shown that emotions cannot be isolated from the social environment in which they arise. Emotions are inextricably intertwined with people's social norms and identities, which are typically outside the scope of standard rationalist accounts. Emotional choice theory seeks to capture not only the social but also the physiological and dynamic character of emotions. It represents a unitary action model to organize, explain, and predict the ways in which emotions shape decision-making.

== See also ==
- Constructivism (international relations)
- Decision-making models
- Decision theory
- Emotional choice theory
- Homo economicus
- Logic of appropriateness
- Preference
- Rational choice theory
- Rational expectations
- Realism (international relations)
- Social choice theory
