= Qin Yaqing =

Chinese political scientist

- 秦亚青
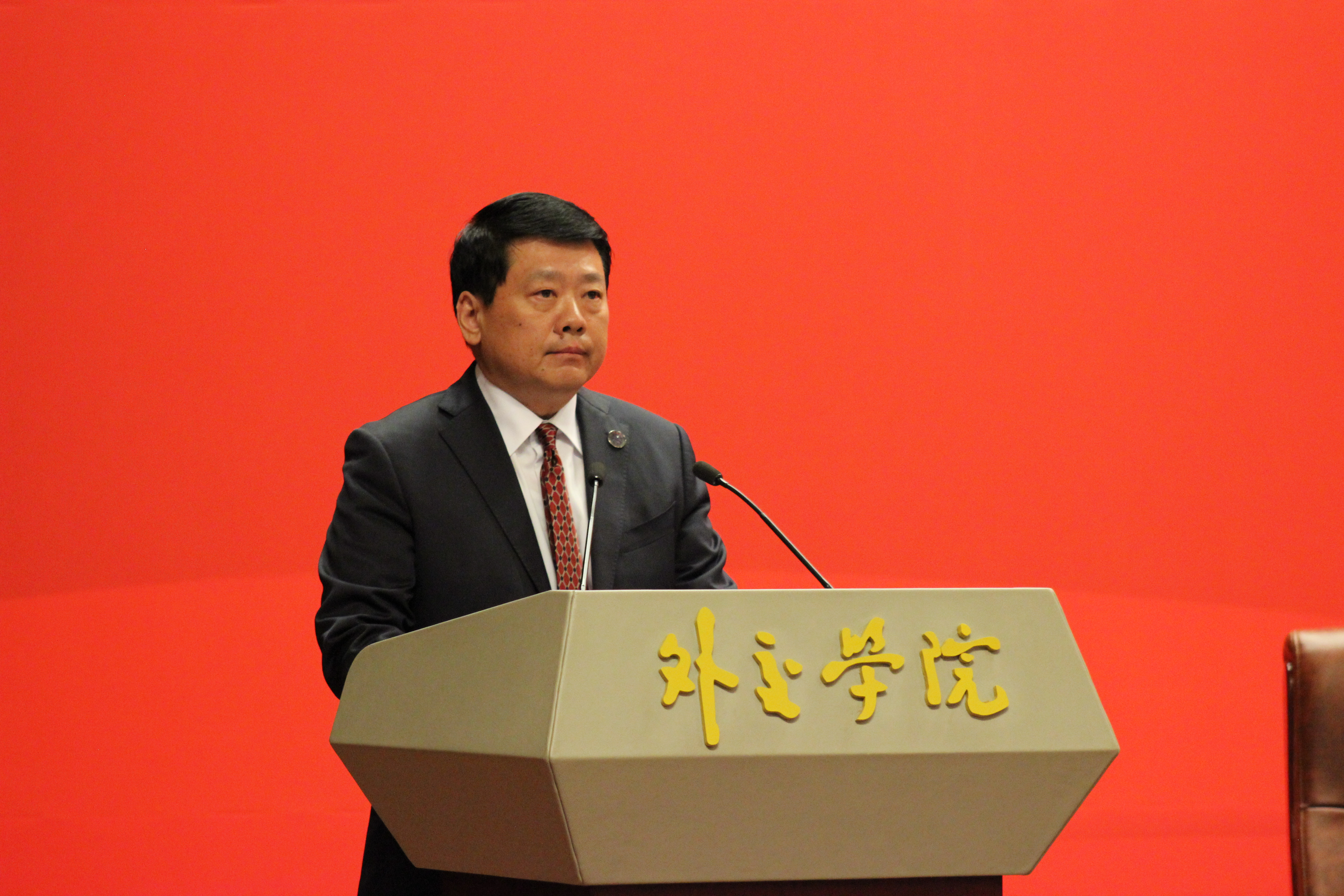
- Qin in September 2015
- Born: Zibo, Shandong, China

Academic background
- Education: Shandong Normal University; Beijing Foreign Studies University; University of Missouri
- Thesis: Hegemony and International Conflicts - the United States Support in the International Armed Conflict (1945-1988) (1994)

Academic work
- School or tradition: Constructivism
- Institutions: Shandong University
- Notable ideas: Relational (Guanxi) Theory of World Politics
- Influenced: Emilian Kavalski

Qin Yaqing (born October 1953) is a Chinese political scientist and a constructivist international relations theorist. Since May 2021, he has been a Chair Professor at Shandong University. Prior to that, Qin was the President and a Professor of China Foreign Affairs University (2014-2019).

Qin is the Chancellor of China Diplomatic Academy, the Executive Vice-president of China National Association for International Studies, a member of Foreign Policy Advisory Group (2008-) and Public Diplomacy Advisory Group (2010-) of Chinese Ministry of Foreign Affairs, and the Director of Institute of International and Strategic Studies, Peking University.

Qin is the editor-in-chief of Foreign Affairs Review as well as editorial board member of World Economics and Politics and Global Governance. Qin received his MA and PhD in Political Science at University of Missouri in 1987 and 1994. He is a Fellow of the Royal Academy of Belgium.

== Works ==
=== Books ===
- Globalizing IR Theory: Critical Engagement (2022)
- 全球治理 : 多元世界的秩序重建 (2019)
- A Relational Theory of World Politics (2018)
- Future in Retrospect: China's Diplomatic History Revisited (2016)
- 实践与变革 : 中国参与国际社会体系进程研究 (2016)
- 敬畏学问 (2014)
- China and East Asia: After the Wall Street Crisis (2012)
- 国际关系理论 : 反思与重构 (2012)
- 关系与过程：中国国际关系理论的文化建构 (2012)
- 当代西方国际思潮 (2012)
- 大国关系与中国外交 (2011)
- 东亚地区合作 (2010)
- 西方国际关系理论经典导读 (2009)
- 国际体系与中国外交 (2009)
- China's "New" Diplomacy: Tactical or Fundamental Change? (2008)
- 理性与国际合作：自由主义国际关系理论研究 (2008)
- 文化与国际社会 : 建构主义国际关系理论研究 (2006)
- 权力·制度·文化：国际关系理论与方法研究文集 (2005)
- 霸权体系与国际冲突：美国在国际武装冲突中的支持行为(1945-1988) (1999)

=== Highly-cited articles ===
- "A Relational Theory of World Politics." International Studies Review 18.1 (2016): 33-47.
- "Continuity through Change: Background Knowledge and China’s International Strategy." Chinese Journal of International Politics 7.3 (2014).
- "Rule, Rules, and Relations: Towards a Synthetic Approach to Governance." Chinese Journal of International Politics 4.2 (2011): 117-145.
- "Development of International Relations theory in China: Progress through Debates." International Relations of the Asia-Pacific 11.2 (2011): 231-257.
- "International Society as a Process: Institutions, Identities, and China’s Peaceful Rise." Chinese Journal of International Politics 3 (2010): 129-153.
- "Development of International Relations Theory in China." International Studies 46.1-2 (2009): 185-201.
- "Relationality and Processual Construction: Bringing Chinese Ideas into International Relations Theory." Social Sciences in China 30.4 (2009): 5-20.
- "Why Is There No Chinese International Relations Theory?." International Relations of the Asia-Pacific 7.3 (2007): 313-340.
