= James Fearon =

American political scientist

- Born: James D. Fearon; 1963 (age 62–63)

James D. Fearon (born c. 1963) is an American political scientist who is the Theodore and Francis Geballe Professor of Political Science at Stanford University. He is known for his work on the theory of civil wars, international bargaining, war's inefficiency puzzle, audience costs, and ethnic constructivism. According to a 2011 survey of International Relations scholars, Fearon is among the most influential International Relations scholars of the last twenty years. His 1995 article "Rationalist Explanations for War" is the most assigned journal article in International Relations graduate training at U.S. universities.

== Academic career ==
Fearon has a PhD from UC Berkeley and a BA from Harvard University. At Berkeley, Kenneth Waltz was Fearon's dissertation advisor. He is a National Academy of Sciences member since 2012.

Fearon's work on wars emphasizes the need to explain why rationally led states end up fighting a war instead of bargaining, even though bargaining can make both sides better off a priori. He also elaborates on how democracies are better able to signal intent in war based on domestic audience costs. Fearon has also contributed to the study of deliberative democracy.

=== Fearon's assumptions on war ===
Fearon has three basic assumptions about war:

- First, war is a more costly choice than peace.
- Second, war is predictably unpredictable. In other words, although neither side may be sure exactly who will win, they can agree on the relative likelihood each will win.
- Third, there are no direct benefits from fighting.

Fearon calls these pieces war's inefficiency puzzle. Fearon contends that anarchy by itself cannot explain why rational actors cannot bargain. He offers three explanations for why bargaining breakdowns, and war, occur.

- First, actors in an anarchic system may suffer from a credible commitment problem, in which there are incentives for either party to renege on their end of an agreement.
- Second, states may have private information and incentives to misrepresent said information during the bargaining stage.
- Third, bargaining may be rendered impossible because of what Fearon dubs "issue indivisibility," in which a particular issue in question cannot be divided.

Fearon was identified by constructivist scholar Marc Lynch as the "leading rationalist" in international relations theory and credited him with resolving (along with constructivist Alexander Wendt) much of the theoretical debate between the two camps. His 2003 study with David Laitin is considered the "most influential" in modern research on civil war.

=== Research on civil wars ===
Besides his 1995 seminal work titled Rationalist Explanations for War, Fearon has been known for his extensive work on the specific causes of the outbreak of civil wars. His 2003 work (coauthored with fellow Stanford political science Professor David Laitin) titled Ethnicity, Insurgency and the Outbreak of Civil War, identifies key factors behind why certain countries experienced civil war outbreak post-World War II, whereas others did not. Fearon and Laitin found that "after controlling for per capita income, more ethnically or religiously diverse countries have been no more likely to experience significant civil violence in this period." The authors further highlight which factors they found were most pertinent, including "poverty—which marks financially and bureaucratically weak states and also favors rebel recruitment—political instability, rough terrain, and large populations."
