= Homeira Moshirzadeh =

Political scientist

- Born: 1962 (age 63–64)
- Education: International Relations
- Occupations: Writer, political scientist

Homeira Moshirzadeh (Persian: حمیرا مشیرزاده; born 1962) is an Iranian political scientist and Profesor titular in the Department of International Relations and an associate faculty at the Center for Women's Studies, at University of Tehran.

== Career ==
Moshirzadeh has published many books in Persian. She has translated some of the major IR texts into Persian, including Hans Morgenthau's Politics among Nations and Alexander Wendt's Social Theory of International Politics.

Her articles on international relations, feminism, Iran 's foreign policy, and dialogue of civilizations have been published in Persian and English journals, including Siasat Khareji (Foreign Policy), Majalleh Daneshkadeh Hoghoogh va Olum Siasi, and The Iranian Journal of International Affairs. Some of her articles on dialogue of civilizations, cultural studies, and women's studies have appeared in edited volumes in Persian and English. Moshirzadeh's From a Social Movement to a Social Theory: History of Feminism won the Women's Library Prize in 2005.

She is a board member of the editorial board at the International Journal of Political Science.

== Works and Publications ==
=== As author ===
- Social Movements: A Theoretical Introduction, 2001
- From a Social Movement to a Social Theory: History of Feminism, 2002
- Theories of International Relations, 2005
- An Introduction to Women's Studies, 2005
- Homeira, Moshirzadeh (2009). "A "Hegemonic Discipline" in an "Anti-Hegemonic" Country" (PDF). International Political Sociology. 3 (3): 342–346. doi:10.1111/j.1749-5687.2009.00079_6.x.
- Civilizational Dialogue and Political Thought: Tehran Papers - Global Encounters: Studies in Comparative Political Theory(Contributing author), 2007 ISBN 978-0-739-12237-2
- Homeira, Morshizadeh (2018). "Iranian scholars and theorizing international relations". In Ersel, Aydinli (ed.). Widening the World of International Relations. Routledge. p. 21. ISBN 978-0-203-70223-9.
- Friendship in International Relations and a Homegrown Perspective: Lessons from Sa’di - co-authored with Fariba Alikarami, 2018.
- Homeira, Moshirzadeh (2002). "Women and the Iranian Revolution". Discourse. 4 (2): 219–224.
- Homeira, Moshirzadeh (2007). "Discursive Foundations of Iran's Nuclear Policy". Security Dialogue. 38 (4): 521–543. doi:10.1177/0967010607084999. ISSN 0967-0106. JSTOR 26299641. S2CID 146436832.

=== Articles ===
- Recent Theoretical Developments in IR: Implications for Indigenous Theorizing, 2011
- Revival of Foreign Policy Analysis: a multi variable analysis, 2015
- Majalleh Daneshkadeh Hoghoogh va Olum Siasi
- Homeira, Moshirzadeh (2013). "Identity and Security in the Middle East". Iranian Review of Foreign Affairs. 4 (2): 5–32.
- Morshizadeh, Homeira (2016). "International Relations in Iran and its Discursive Dynamics". Iranian Review of Foreign Affairs. 5 (20). ISSN 2008-8221.
- Siasat Khareji (Foreign Policy)
- Homeira, Moshirzadeh (2017). "Iranian Scholars and Theorizing International Relations: Achievements and Challenges". All Azimuth: A Journal of Foreign Policy and Peace. 7 (1): 103–120. ISSN 2146-7757.
- Homeira, Moshirzadeh (2010). "Election molding theory and organizations, asking international". Faṣlnāmah-i Pizhūhish-i Huqūq-i ̒Umūmī. 12 (28): 135–158. ISSN 2345-6116.
- The Iranian Journal of International Affairs
- Iranian Exceptionalism and Iran-US Relations: From 1979 to 2021, 2020.

=== As editor ===
- Caspian Sea: An Overview (Editor), 2002
- Abbas, Manoochehri (2007). Civilizational Dialogue and Political Thought: Tehran Papers - Global Encounters: Studies in Comparative Political Theory. Lexington Books. p. 212. ISBN 978-0-739-12236-5.

== Translations ==
- Social Theory of International Politics by Alexander Wendt
- Politics among Nations by Hans Morgenthau
