= Louis Pauly =

American academic (born 1952)

Louis W. Pauly, a scholar of international and comparative political economy, is the J. Stefan Dupré Distinguished Professor of Political Economy in the Department of Political Science of the University of Toronto, where he has held the Canada Research Chair in Globalization and Governance and served as Department Chair. He was Director of the Centre for International Studies, Acting Director of the Munk Centre, and Founding Director of the Centre for the Study of Global Japan in the Munk School of Global Affairs and Public Policy. He is a Fellow of the Royal Society of Canada, a Fellow of Trinity College (Toronto), and a Senior Fellow of Massey College. He received the Distinguished Scholar of International Political Economy Award from the International Studies Association and has held visiting professorial positions at the WZB Berlin Social Science Center, Hebrew University of Jerusalem, Oxford University, Northwestern University, and Osaka City University.

== Biography ==
Born in Erie, Pennsylvania in 1952, Pauly is a graduate of Cornell University, the London School of Economics and Political Science, New York University, and Fordham University. He has held management positions in the Royal Bank of Canada and served on the staff of the International Monetary Fund. He is a former editor of the journal International Organization.

== Publications ==
Among his publications are various books and edited volumes, including:

- Insuring States in an Uncertain World: Towards the Collaborative Government of Complex Risks (2025) ISBN 978-1-009-66289-5
- Power in a Complex Global System (2014) ISBN 978-0-415-73880-4
- Global Ordering: Institutions and Autonomy in a Changing World (2009) ISBN 978-0-7748-1433-1
- Global Liberalism and Political Order: Toward a New Grand Compromise? (2007) ISBN 0-7914-7045-8
- Complex Sovereignty: Reconstituting Political Authority in the Twenty-First Century (2005) ISBN 0-8020-3881-6
- Governing the World's Money (2002) ISBN 0-8014-4019-X
- Democracy beyond the State? The European Dilemma and the Emerging Global Order (2000) ISBN 0-8476-9900-5
- The Myth of the Global Corporation (1998) ISBN 0-691-01007-2
- Who Elected the Bankers? Surveillance and Control in the World Economy (1997) ISBN 0-8014-3322-3
- Choosing to Cooperate: How States Avoid Loss (1993) ISBN 0-8018-4611-0
- Opening Financial Markets: Banking Politics on the Pacific Rim (1988) ISBN 0-8014-9928-3
