= Constructivism (international relations) =

Social theory in international relations

In international relations (IR), constructivism is a social theory that asserts that significant aspects of international relations are shaped by ideational factors—i.e. the mental process of forming ideas. The most important ideational factors are those that are collectively held; these collectively held beliefs construct the interests and identities of actors. Constructivist scholarship in IR is rooted in approaches and theories from the field of sociology.

In contrast to other prominent IR approaches and theories (such as realism and rational choice), constructivists see identities and interests of actors as socially constructed and changeable; identities are not static and cannot be exogenously assumed—i.e. interpreted by reference to outside influences alone. Similar to rational choice, constructivism does not make broad and specific predictions about international relations; it is an approach to studying international politics, not a substantive theory of international politics. Constructivist analysis can only provide substantive explanations or predictions once the relevant actors and their interests have been identified, as well as the content of social structures.

The main theories competing with constructivism are variants of realism, liberalism and rational choice that emphasize materialism (the notion that the physical world determines political behavior on its own), and individualism (the notion that individual units can be studied apart from the broader systems that they are embedded in). Whereas other prominent approaches conceptualize power in material terms (e.g. military and economic capabilities), constructivist analyses also see power as the ability to structure and constitute the nature of social relations among actors.

== Development ==
Nicholas Onuf has been credited with coining the term constructivism to describe theories that stress the socially constructed character of international relations. Since the late 1980s to early 1990s, constructivism has become one of the major schools of thought within international relations.

Two major changes in the structure of world politics in the 1990s created an opportunity for constructivism to satisfy intellectual needs. The first is the end of the Cold War, which temporarily suspended the security dilemma, altered the distribution of power, and ushered in a period of peace and unipolarity where ideational factors such as norms, identity, culture, and legitimacy seemed to matter. The second was the expansion of global civil society, in particular in the form of non-governmental organizations, which suggested that more actors mattered in world politics than just states.

The earliest constructivist works focused on establishing that norms mattered in international politics. Peter J. Katzenstein's edited volume The Culture of National Security compiled works by numerous prominent and emerging constructivists, showing that constructivist insights were important in the field of security studies, an area of International Relations in which realists had been dominant. The journal International Organization, the top journal in the field of international relations, also published a number of important constructivist articles, helping to lend legitimacy to the framework.

After establishing that norms mattered in international politics, later veins of constructivism focused on explaining the circumstances under which some norms mattered and others did not. Swathes of constructivist research have focused on norm entrepreneurs: international organizations and law: epistemic communities; speech, argument, and persuasion; and structural configuration as mechanisms and processes for social construction.

Alexander Wendt is the most prominent advocate of social constructivism in the field of international relations. Wendt's 1992 article "Anarchy is What States Make of It: the Social Construction of Power Politics" laid the theoretical groundwork for challenging what he considered to be a flaw shared by both neorealists and neoliberal institutionalists, namely, a commitment to a (crude) form of materialism. By attempting to show that even such a core realist concept as "power politics" is socially constructed—that is, not given by nature and hence, capable of being transformed by human practice—Wendt opened the way for a generation of international relations scholars to pursue work on a wide range of issues from a constructivist perspective. Wendt further developed these ideas in his central work, Social Theory of International Politics (1999). Following up on Wendt, Martha Finnemore offered the first "sustained, systematic empirical argument in support of the constructivist claim that international normative structures matter in world politics" in her 1996 book National Interests in International Society.

There are several strands of constructivism. On the one hand, there are "conventional" constructivist scholars such as Kathryn Sikkink, Peter Katzenstein, Elizabeth Kier, Martha Finnemore and Alexander Wendt, who use widely accepted methodologies and epistemologies. Their work has been widely accepted within the mainstream IR community and generated vibrant scholarly discussions among realists, liberals, and constructivists. These scholars hold that research oriented around causal explanations and constitutive explanations is appropriate. Wendt refers to this form of constructivism as "thin" constructivism. On the other hand, there are "critical" radical constructivists who take discourse and linguistics more seriously, and adopt non-positivist methodologies and epistemologies. A third strand, known as critical constructivism, takes conventional constructivists to task for systematically downplaying or omitting class factors. Despite their differences, all strands of constructivism agree that neorealism and neoliberalism pay insufficient attention to social construction in world politics.

== Theory ==
Constructivism primarily seeks to demonstrate how core aspects of international relations are, contrary to the assumptions of neorealism and neoliberalism, socially constructed. This means that they are given their form by ongoing processes of social practice and interaction. Alexander Wendt calls two increasingly accepted basic tenets of constructivism "that the structures of human association are determined primarily by shared ideas rather than material forces, and that the identities and interests of purposive actors are constructed by these shared ideas rather than given by nature." This does not mean that constructivists believe international politics is "ideas all the way down", but rather is characterized both by material factors and ideational factors.

Central to constructivism are the notions that ideas matter, and that agents are socially constructed (rather than given).

Constructivist research is focused both on causal explanations for phenomena, as well as analyses of how things are constituted. In the study of national security, the emphasis is on the conditioning that culture and identity exert on security policies and related behaviors. Identities are necessary in order to ensure at least some minimal level of predictability and order. The object of the constructivist discourse can be conceived as the arrival, a fundamental factor in the field of international relations, of the recent debate on epistemology, the sociology of knowledge, the agent/structure relationship, and the ontological status of social facts.

The notion that international relations are not only affected by power politics, but also by ideas, is shared by writers who describe themselves as constructivist theorists. According to this view, the fundamental structures of international politics are social rather than strictly material. This leads to social constructivists to argue that changes in the nature of social interaction between states can bring a fundamental shift towards greater international security.

=== Challenging realism ===
During constructivism's formative period, neorealism was the dominant discourse of international relations. Much of constructivism's initial theoretical work challenged basic neorealist assumptions. Neorealists are fundamentally causal structuralists. They hold that the majority of important content to international politics is explained by the structure of the international system, a position first advanced in Kenneth Waltz's Man, the State, and War and fully elucidated in his core text of neorealism, Theory of International Politics. Specifically, international politics is primarily determined by the fact that the international system is anarchic—it lacks any overarching authority, instead it is composed of units (states) which are formally equal—they are all sovereign over their own territory. Such anarchy, neorealists argue, forces States to act in certain ways, specifically, they can only rely on themselves for security (they have to self-help). The way in which anarchy forces them to act in such ways, to defend their own self-interest in terms of power, neorealists argue, explains most of international politics. Because of this, neorealists tend to disregard explanations of international politics at the "unit" or "state" level. Kenneth Waltz attacked such a focus as being reductionist.

Constructivism, particularly in the formative work of Wendt, challenges this assumption by showing that the causal powers attributed to "structure" by neorealists are in fact not "given", but rest on the way in which structure is constructed by social practice. Removed from presumptions about the nature of the identities and interests of the actors in the system, and the meaning that social institutions (including anarchy) have for such actors, Wendt argues neorealism's "structure" reveals very little: "it does not predict whether two states will be friends or foes, will recognize each other's sovereignty, will have dynastic ties, will be revisionist or status quo powers, and so on". Because such features of behavior are not explained by anarchy, and require instead the incorporation of evidence about the interests and identities held by key actors, neorealism's focus on the material structure of the system (anarchy) is misplaced. Wendt goes further than this—arguing that because the way in which anarchy constrains states depends on the way in which states conceive of anarchy, and conceive of their own identities and interests, anarchy is not necessarily even a self-help system. It only forces states to self-help if they conform to neorealist assumptions about states as seeing security as a competitive, relative concept, where the gain of security for any one state means the loss of security for another. If states instead hold alternative conceptions of security, either "co-operative", where states can maximise their security without negatively affecting the security of another, or "collective" where states identify the security of other states as being valuable to themselves, anarchy will not lead to self-help at all. Neorealist conclusions, as such, depend entirely on unspoken and unquestioned assumptions about the way in which the meaning of social institutions are constructed by actors. Crucially, because neorealists fail to recognize this dependence, they falsely assume that such meanings are unchangeable, and exclude the study of the processes of social construction which actually do the key explanatory work behind neorealist observations.

As a criticism of neorealism and neoliberalism (which were the dominant strands of IR theory during the 1980s), constructivism tended to be lumped in with all approaches that criticized the so-called "neo-neo" debate. Constructivism has therefore often been conflated with critical theory. However, while constructivism may use aspects of critical theory and vice versa, the mainstream variants of constructivism are positivist.

In a response to constructivism, John Mearsheimer has argued that ideas and norms only matter on the margins, and that appeals by leaders to norms and morals often reflect self-interest.

=== Identities and interests ===
As constructivists reject neorealism's conclusions about the determining effect of anarchy on the behavior of international actors, and move away from neorealism's underlying materialism, they create the necessary room for the identities and interests of international actors to take a central place in theorising international relations. Now that actors are not simply governed by the imperatives of a self-help system, their identities and interests become important in analysing how they behave. Like the nature of the international system, constructivists see such identities and interests as not objectively grounded in material forces (such as dictates of the human nature that underpins classical realism) but the result of ideas and the social construction of such ideas. In other words, the meanings of ideas, objects, and actors are all given by social interaction. People give objects their meanings and can attach different meanings to different things.

Martha Finnemore has been influential in examining the way in which international organizations are involved in these processes of the social construction of actor's perceptions of their interests. In National Interests In International Society, Finnemore attempts to "develop a systemic approach to understanding state interests and state behavior by investigating an international structure, not of power, but of meaning and social value". "Interests", she explains, "are not just 'out there' waiting to be discovered; they are constructed through social interaction". Finnemore provides three case studies of such construction—the creation of Science Bureaucracies in states due to the influence of the UNESCO, the role of the Red Cross in the Geneva Conventions and the World Bank's influence of attitudes to poverty.

Studies of such processes are examples of the constructivist attitude towards state interests and identities. Such interests and identities are central determinants of state behaviour, as such studying their nature and their formation is integral in constructivist methodology to explaining the international system. Despite this refocus onto identities and interests—properties of states—constructivists are not necessarily wedded to focusing their analysis at the unit-level of international politics: the state. Constructivists such as Finnemore and Wendt both emphasize that while ideas and processes tend to explain the social construction of identities and interests, such ideas and processes form a structure of their own which impact upon international actors. Their central difference from neorealists is to see the structure of international politics in primarily ideational, rather than material, terms.

=== Norms ===
Constructivist scholars have explored in-depth the role of norms in world politics. Abram Chayes and Antonia Handler Chayes have defined “norms” as “a broad class of prescriptive statements—rules, standards, principles, and so forth—both procedural and substantive” that are “prescriptions for action in situations of choice, carrying a sense of obligation, a sense that they ought to be followed”.

Norm-based constructivist approaches generally assume that actors tend to adhere to a “logic of appropriateness”. That means that actors follow “internalized prescriptions of what is socially defined as normal, true, right, or good, without, or in spite of calculation of consequences and expected utility”. This logic of appropriateness stands in contrast to the rational choice “logic of consequences”, where actors are assumed to choose the most efficient means to reach their goals on the basis of a cost-benefit analysis.

Constructivist norm scholarship has investigated a wide range of issue areas in world politics. For example, Peter Katzenstein and the contributors to his edited volume, The Culture of National Security, have argued that states act on security choices not only in the context of their physical capabilities but also on the basis of normative understandings. Martha Finnemore has suggested that international organizations like the World Bank or UNESCO help diffuse norms which, in turn, influence how states define their national interests. Finnemore and Kathryn Sikkink have explored how norms affect political change. In doing so, they have stressed the connections between norms and rationality, rather than their opposition to each other. They have also highlighted the importance of “norm entrepreneurs” in advocating and spreading certain norms.

Some scholars have investigated the role of individual norms in world politics. For instance, Audie Klotz has examined how the global norm against apartheid developed across different states (the United Kingdom, the United States, and Zimbabwe) and institutions (the Commonwealth, the Organization of African Unity, and the United Nations). The emergence and institutionalization of this norm, she argued, has contributed to the end of the apartheid regime in South Africa. Nina Tannenwald has made the case that the non-use of nuclear weapons since 1945 can be attributed to the strength of a nuclear weapons taboo, i.e., a norm against the use of nuclear weapons. She has argued that this norm has become so deeply embedded in American political and social culture that nuclear weapons have not been employed, even in cases when their use would have made strategic or tactical sense. Michael Barnett has taken an evolutionary approach to trace how the norm of political humanitarianism emerged.

Martha Finnemore and Kathryn Sikkink distinguish between three types of norms:

1. Regulative norms: they "order and constrain behavior."
2. Constitutive norms: they "create new actors, interests, or categories of action."
3. Evaluative and prescriptive norms: they have an "oughtness" quality to them.

Finnemore, Sikkink, Jeffrey W. Legro and others have argued that the robustness (or effectiveness) of norms can be measured by factors such as:

- specificity: norms that are clear and specific are more likely to be effective.
- longevity: norms with a history are more likely to be effective.
- universality: norms that make general claims (rather than localized and particularistic claims) are more likely to be effective.
- prominence: norms that are widely accepted among powerful actors are more likely to be effective.

Jeffrey Checkel argues that there are two common types of explanations for the efficacy of norms:

1. Rationalism: actors comply with norms due to coercion, cost-benefit calculations, and material incentives.
2. Constructivism: actors comply with norms due to social learning and socialization.

In terms of specific norms, constructivist scholars have shown how the following norms emerged:

- International law: a transnational network of lawyers succeeded in codifying new international legal principles and regulate power politics over the course of the 19th and 20th centuries.
- Humanitarian intervention: over time, conceptions of who was "human" changed, which led states to increasingly engage in humanitarian interventions in the 20th century.
- Nuclear taboo: a norm against nuclear weapons developed since 1945.
- Ban on landmines: activism by transnational advocacy groups led to a norm prohibiting landmines.
- Norms of sovereignty
- Norms against assassination
- Election monitoring
- Taboo against the weaponization of water
- Anti-whaling norm
- Anti-torture norm

=== Research areas ===
Many constructivists analyse international relations by looking at goals, threats, fears, cultures, identities, and other elements of "social reality" as social facts. In an important edited volume, The Culture of National Security, constructivist scholars—including Elizabeth Kier, Jeffrey Legro, and Peter Katzenstein—challenged many realist assumptions about the dynamics of international politics, particularly in the context of military affairs. Thomas J. Biersteker and Cynthia Weber applied constructivist approaches to understand the evolution of state sovereignty as a central theme in international relations, and works by Rodney Bruce Hall and Daniel Philpott (among others) developed constructivist theories of major transformations in the dynamics of international politics. In international political economy, the application of constructivism has been less frequent. Notable examples of constructivist work in this area include Kathleen R. McNamara's study of European Monetary Union and Mark Blyth's analysis of the rise of Reaganomics in the United States.

By focusing on how language and rhetoric are used to construct the social reality of the international system, constructivists are often seen as more optimistic about progress in international relations than versions of realism loyal to a purely materialist ontology, but a growing number of constructivists question the "liberal" character of constructivist thought and express greater sympathy for realist pessimism concerning the possibility of emancipation from power politics.

Constructivism is often presented as an alternative to the two leading theories of international relations, realism and liberalism, but some maintain that it is not necessarily inconsistent with one or both. Wendt shares some key assumptions with leading realist and neorealist scholars, such as the existence of anarchy and the centrality of states in the international system. However, Wendt renders anarchy in cultural rather than materialist terms; he also offers a sophisticated theoretical defense of the state-as-actor assumption in international relations theory. This is a contentious issue within segments of the IR community as some constructivists challenge Wendt on some of these assumptions (see, for example, exchanges in Review of International Studies, vol. 30, 2004). It has been argued that progress in IR theory will be achieved when Realism and Constructivism can be aligned or even synthesized. An early example of such synthesis was Jennifer Sterling-Folker's analysis of the United States’ international monetary policy following the Bretton Woods system. Sterling-Folker argued that the U.S. shift towards unilateralism is partially accounted for by realism's emphasis of an anarchic system, but constructivism helps to account for important factors from the domestic or second level of analysis.

=== Recent developments ===
A significant group of scholars who study processes of social construction self-consciously eschew the label "constructivist". They argue that "mainstream" constructivism has abandoned many of the most important insights from linguistic turn and social-constructionist theory in the pursuit of respectability as a "scientific" approach to international relations. Even some putatively "mainstream" constructivists, such as Jeffrey Checkel, have expressed concern that constructivists have gone too far in their efforts to build bridges with non-constructivist schools of thought.

A growing number of constructivists contend that current theories pay inadequate attention to the role of habitual and unreflective behavior in world politics, the centrality of relations and processes in constructing world politics, or both.

Advocates of the "practice turn" take inspiration from work in neuroscience, as well as that of social theorists such as Pierre Bourdieu, that stresses the significance of habit and practices in psychological and social life - essentially calling for greater attention and sensitivity towards the 'every day' and 'taken for granted' activities of international politics Some scholars have adopted the related sociological approach known as Actor-Network Theory (ANT), which extends the early focus of the Practice Turn on the work of Pierre Bourdieu towards that of Bruno Latour and others. Scholars have employed ANT in order to disrupt traditional world political binaries (civilized/barbarian, democratic/autocratic, etc.), consider the implications of a posthuman understanding of IR, explore the infrastructures of world politics, and consider the effects of technological agency.

== Notable constructivists in international relations ==
- Emanuel Adler
- Michael Barnett
- Thomas J. Biersteker
- Mark Blyth
- Jeffrey T. Checkel
- Martha Finnemore
- Ernst B. Haas
- Peter M. Haas
- Ian Hacking
- Ted Hopf
- Peter J. Katzenstein
- Margaret Keck
- Judith Kelley
- Friedrich Kratochwil
- Richard Ned Lebow
- Daniel H. Nexon
- Qin Yaqing
- Nicholas Onuf
- Erik Ringmar
- Thomas Risse
- John Ruggie
- Chris Reus-Smit
- Kathryn Sikkink
- J. Ann Tickner
- Ole Wæver
- Alexander Wendt

== Critique by emotional choice theorists ==
Proponents of emotional choice theory argue that constructivist approaches neglect the emotional underpinnings of social interactions, normative behavior, and decision-making in general. They point out that the constructivist paradigm is generally based on the assumption that decision-making is a conscious process based on thoughts and beliefs. It presumes that people decide on the basis of reflection and deliberation. However, cumulative research in neuroscience suggests that only a small part of the brain's activities operate at the level of conscious thinking. The vast majority of its activities consist of unconscious appraisals and emotions.

The significance of emotions in decision-making has generally been ignored by constructivist perspectives, according to these critics. Moreover, emotional choice theorists contend that the constructivist paradigm has difficulty incorporating emotions into its models, because it cannot account for the physiological dynamics of emotions. Psychologists and neurologists have shown that emotions are based on bodily processes over which individuals have only limited control. They are inextricably intertwined with people's brain functions and autonomic nervous systems, which are typically outside the scope of standard constructivist models.

Emotional choice theory seeks to capture not only the social but also the physiological and dynamic character of emotions. It posits that emotion plays a key role in normative action. Emotions endow norms and identities with meaning. If people feel strongly about norms, they are particularly likely to adhere to them. Rules that cease to resonate at an affective level, however, often come to lose their prescriptive power. Emotional choice theorists note that recent findings in neurology suggest that humans generally feel before they think. So emotions may lead them to prioritize the constructivist “logic of appropriateness” over the rationalist “logic of consequences,” or vice versa. Emotions may also infuse the logic of appropriateness and inform actors how to adjudicate between different norms.

== See also ==
- Constructivism (philosophy of science)
- Constructivism (psychological school)
- Emotional choice theory
- English school of international relations theory
- International legal theories
- Logic of appropriateness
