= Martha Finnemore =

American political scientist and academic

Martha Finnemore is an American constructivist scholar of international relations, and professor at the Elliott School of International Affairs at George Washington University. She is best known for her books National Interests in International Society, The Purpose of Intervention, and Rules for the World (with Michael N. Barnett), which helped to pioneer constructivism. As of March 2026 she is professor of political science and international affairs at the Elliott School of International Affairs of George Washington University in Washington, D. C..

== Early life and education ==
Martha Finnemore completed her B.A. at Harvard. This was followed first by an M.A. in government, with distinction, from the University of Sydney, Australia, in 1984, and then another M.A. in political science (1988) from Stanford University. In 1992 she earned a Ph.D. from Stanford.

== Career ==
Finnemore has held research appointments at the Brookings Institution and Stanford University.

As of March 2026 she is professor of political science and international affairs at the Elliott School of International Affairs of George Washington University.

== Work and publications ==
In The Purpose of Intervention (2003), she finds that the types of military interventions that states engage in have changed over time. For example, it was accepted practice for states to intervene militarily to collect debts during the 19th century, but it became widely rejected in the 20th century. Similarly, she shows that the type and frequency of humanitarian interventions have changed drastically since the 19th century, with a massive increase in humanitarian interventions since the end of the Cold War. According to Finnemore, existing realist and liberal theories of international relations cannot account for these changes. Using a constructivist approach, she finds that changing normative contexts led states to conceive of their interests differently. International norms altered common understandings of the appropriate ends and means of military intervention, as well as which humans were deserving of military protection by outsiders.

In Rules for the World (co-authored by Michael Barnett; 2004), Finnemore and Barnett argue that international organizations derive power and autonomy from their rational-legal authority and control of information. International organizations are therefore purposive social agents that can act inconsistently with the intentions of the founders of the organizations (which are often states). In contrast to some realist and liberal theories of international relations, Barnett and Finnemore show that international organizations are not just a reflection of state interests and that they do not necessarily act efficiently. International organizations can develop bureaucratic cultures that result in adverse outcomes (what they call "pathologies"). They list five mechanisms that breed organizational pathologies:

1. Irrationality of rationalization: when an organization sticks to existing rules and procedures regardless of circumstances rather than act in ways most appropriate for the circumstances
2. Universalism: the application of universal rules and categories may not reflect specific contexts
3. Normalization of deviance: deviations from existing rules can become normalized and lead to aberrational behaviors
4. Organizational insulation: when organizations do not get feedback from the environment about their performance and are unable to update their behavior
5. Cultural contestation: different cultures within an organization may lead to clashes that produce adverse outcomes

Her 1998 study, co-authored with Kathryn Sikkink, on the life cycle of norms is among the most cited articles published in International Organization, the leading International Relations journal. Finnemore and Sikkink identify three stages in the life cycle of a norm:

1. Norm emergence: Norm entrepreneurs seek to persuade others to adopt their ideas about what is desirable and appropriate
2. Norm cascade: When a norm has broad acceptance, with norm leaders pressuring others to adopt and adhere to the norm
3. Norm internalization: When the norm has acquired a "taken-for-granted" quality where compliance with the norm is nearly automatic

Her scholarship has highlighted the role of norms and culture in international politics, as well as shown that international organizations are consequential and purposive social agents in world politics that can shape state interests.

== Recognition and awards ==
According to a review of her 1996 book National Interests in International Society, Finnemore became "the first scholar of international relations to offer a sustained, systematic empirical argument in support of the constructivist claim that international normative structures matter in world politics."

Her 2004 book, The Purpose of Intervention won the Woodrow Wilson Award from the American Political Science Association, for "the best book published in the United States during the prior year on government, politics or international affairs.

Her 2006 Rules for the World won the Best Book Award from the International Studies Association (ISA).

In 2009, a survey of over 2700 international relations faculty in ten countries named her one of the twenty five most influential scholars in the discipline, and one of the five scholars whose work in the last five years has been the most interesting; an earlier survey of over 1000 American international relations faculty also ranked her similarly in both categories.

In 2011, she was elected as a member of the American Academy of Arts and Sciences.

In 2017 Finnemore received the J. Ann Tickner Award from the ISA. for "high-quality, pioneering scholarship that pushes the boundaries of the discipline with a deep commitment to service, especially teaching and mentoring."

In 2021, she was co-recipient of the Best Post-PhD Paper Award (2021) awarded by the International Studies Association Theory Section, "to honor excellent work in theorizing international politics across the plurality of theoretical approaches", for "The Politics of Aspiration". In the same year, she received a university-wide award for excellence in scholarship from GWU, the Distinguished Scholar Award.

She has been the recipient of fellowships from the MacArthur Foundation and the United States Institute of Peace.

== Books ==
- Finnemore, Martha (1996), National Interests in International Society, Cornell University Press, ISBN 978-0-8014-8323-3.
- Finnemore, Martha (2003), The Purpose of Intervention: Changing Beliefs about the Use of Force, Cornell University Press, ISBN 978-0-8014-3845-5. Winner, American Political Science Association's Woodrow Wilson Foundation Award for the best book on government, politics, or international affairs, 2004.
- Barnett, Michael N.; Finnemore, Martha (2004), Rules for the World: International Organizations in Global Politics, Cornell University Press, ISBN 978-0-8014-8823-8. Winner, International Studies Association Book Award, 2006, and Academic Council of the United Nations System Book Award, 2007.
