= Ted Hopf =

American academic

Theodore Hopf (born 1959) is an American academic and a leading figure in constructivism in international relations theory. He was a Provost Chair Professor in the Department of Political Science at the Faculty of Arts and Social Sciences, National University of Singapore (NUS). He was also jointly appointed as Research Cluster Leader on Identities at the Asia Research Institute (ARI) at the National University of Singapore (NUS).

== Education and career ==
Theodore Hopf received his BA from Woodrow Wilson School of Public and International Affairs at Princeton University in 1983 and Ph.D. in Political Science from Columbia University. His main fields of interest are international relations theory, qualitative research methods, and identity, with special reference to the Soviet Union and the former Soviet space.

Hopf was the Provost Chair Professor of Political Science at NUS, and previously served on the faculties of Ohio State University, Ohio University and the University of Michigan. Hopf also held a 3-year joint appointment as Cluster Leader of the Identities Cluster in the Asia Research Institute (ARI) and Department of Political Science, National University of Singapore (NUS) from 1 July 2017 - 1 December 2020.

== Dismissal ==
Following an internal, non-independent university review, Hopf's tenure was revoked and he was dismissed from the National University of Singapore on 1 December 2020 over an allegation of sexual misconduct. A report sent to all staff, students and alumni on the same date states that Hopf admitted to making offensive remarks to a student about her body and sending a sexually explicit text. However, according to the report, Hopf claimed that the text was accidental and did not admit any allegations of physical harassment. Nonetheless, without awaiting an independent police investigation, the review board found that allegations of unwanted physical contact were "credible", and Hopf was found to have failed to follow the Staff Code of Conduct.

The Singapore Police Force investigated the matter and concluded there was no prosecutable offense committed in March 2021. They issued Hopf a warning.

== Scholarship ==
His contribution to constructivism has been to bring the domestic into the theorization of how states acquire their identities. This provides a mid-range constructivism, below systemic, but avoiding the psychologism of individual levels of analysis. Hopf has been a force in advocating the adoption of as many mainstream social science methodological techniques as possible so long as their adoption does not do violence to the interpretivist roots of constructivism. Most recently he has been exploring how habits contribute to a constructivist understanding of social order in world politics.

He has authored or edited five books. His 2002 Social Construction of International Politics: Identities and Foreign Policies, Moscow, 1955 and 1999, published by Cornell University Press won the Marshall D. Shulman Award, presented by the American Association for the Advancement of Slavic Studies, for the best book of 2003 on the international politics of the former Soviet Union and Central Europe. In April 2012, Reconstructing the Cold War: The Early Years, 1945–1958, was published by Oxford University Press.

A full list of Hopf's scholarly publications is maintained at his website.

== Selected publications ==
- "The Promise of Constructivism in International Relations Theory", International Security 23 (1) (Summer 1998) pp. 171–200
- Social Construction of International Politics: Identities and Foreign Policies, Moscow, 1955 and 1999 (Ithaca: Cornell University Press, 2002)
- "The Logic of Habit in IR Theory", European Journal of International Relations, December 2010
- Reconstructing the Cold War: The Early Years, 1945–1958 (Oxford: Oxford University Press, 2013)
