= International Organization (journal) =

- Discipline: International relations
- Language: English
- Edited by: Brett Ashley Leeds and Layna Mosley

Publication details
- History: 1947–present
- Publisher: Cambridge University Press on behalf of the International Organization Foundation
- Frequency: Quarterly
- Impact factor: 7.8 (2022)

Standard abbreviations
- Bluebook: Int'l Org.
- ISO 4: Int. Organ.

Indexing
- CODEN: IOCMFZ
- ISSN: 0020-8183 (print); 1531-5088 (web)
- LCCN: 49001752
- JSTOR: 00208183
- OCLC no.: 871573081

Links
- Journal homepage; Online access; Online archive; Online access at Project MUSE

International Organization is a quarterly peer-reviewed academic journal that covers the entire field of international affairs. It was established in 1947 and is published by Cambridge University Press on behalf of the International Organization Foundation. The editors-in-chief are Brett Ashley Leeds and Layna Mosley.

International Organization is considered the leading journal in the field of international relations, and one of the top journals in political science. In a 2005 survey of international relations scholars on "which journals publish articles that have the greatest impact" in their field, about 70% included International Organization among the 4 "top journals", ranking it first among 28 journals. According to the Journal Citation Reports, the journal has a 2022 impact factor of 7.8, ranking it 3rd out of 187 journals in the category "Political Science" and 1st out of 96 journals in the category "International Relations".

The journal was founded in 1947 by the World Peace Foundation, a philanthropic institution. In its early years, the journal focused on the United Nations, but expanded its scope over time to become a general international relations journal. The journal has been credited with helping to establish the subfield of international political economy within international relations. Robert Keohane and Joseph Nye, who joined the journal in 1968, played an important role in steering the journal from scholarship focused on the UN to generalist scholarship in international relations. Keohane and Nye broadened the definition of institution so that it did not exclusively refer to formal organizations. In the 1990s, the journal played an important role in expanding the theoretical pluralism of international relations scholarship, bringing prominence to social theories (such as rational choice and constructivism) alongside the traditional realist and liberal theoretical frameworks.

Keohane was editor of the journal from 1972 to 1980. Peter J. Katzenstein was editor of the journal from 1980 to 1986. Stephen D. Krasner was editor of the journal from 1986 to 1991. Lisa Martin was the first female editor of the journal from 2001 to 2006. The journal has been a flagship journal of international relations since the mid-1970s.
