= Kathryn Sikkink =

American academic

Kathryn A. Sikkink
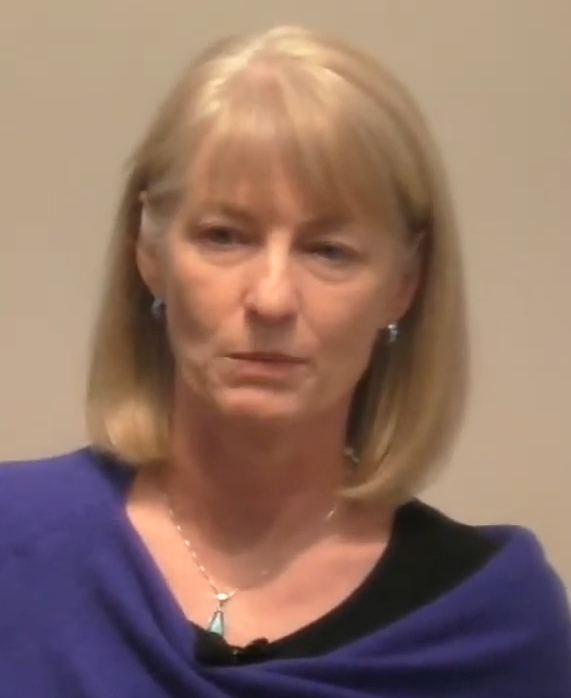
- Awards: Robert F. Kennedy Book Award (2013); Guggenheim Fellowship (2008)

Academic background
- Education: University of Minnesota (BA); Columbia University (MA, PhD)

Academic work
- Discipline: Political science
- Sub-discipline: International Relations
- School or tradition: Constructivism
- Institutions: University of Minnesota; Harvard University

Kathryn A. Sikkink is an American author, human rights academic, and scholar of international relations working primarily through the theoretical strain of constructivism. In early 2026, she is a professor at Harvard Kennedy School.

== Education ==
Sikkink started her studies at the University of Minnesota studying International Relations. She graduated in 1980 summa cum laude. She went on to receive her master's in political science, international relations from Columbia University in 1983. Sikkink briefly studied at the Institute for Latin American and Iberian Studies at Columbia University in 1984, where she earned a Certificate of Latin American and Iberian Studies. She stayed on at Columbia, where she earned her Ph.D. Her doctorate was in political science and international relations.

She also won a Fulbright Scholarship to Argentina.

== Career ==
Prior to her career at Harvard University, Sikkink previously served as a Regents Professor and the McKnight Presidential Chair of Political Science at the University of Minnesota.

In early 2026, she is the Ryan Family Professor of Human Rights Policy; she was also the Carol K. Pforzheimer Professor at the Radcliffe Institute for Advanced Study at the John F. Kennedy School of Government, Harvard University from 2014 to 2019.

Sikkink studies international norms and institutions, transnational advocacy networks, the impact of human rights law and policies, and transitional justice.

== Recognition and awards ==
Sikkink is the recipient of the Grawemeyer World Order Award from the University of Louisville for her book (with Margaret Keck) Activists Beyond Borders (1998). In 2008, Sikkink received a Guggenheim Fellowship. In 2012, she won the Robert F. Kennedy Book Award for her book on international human rights titled The Justice Cascade, which discusses the origins and effects of human rights trials on geopolitics and global justice. She was elected to the American Philosophical Society in 2013. In 2015 Sikkink received the J. Ann Tickner Award from the International Studies Association. In 2020 she was elected to the British Academy.

== Scholarly impact ==
Her 1998 study, co-authored with Martha Finnemore, on the life cycle of norms is among the most cited articles published in International Organization, a leading International Relations journal. In early 2026, her h-index was 61.

== Publications ==
Sikkink's books include Activists Beyond Borders, Evidence for Hope, The Justice Cascade, Ideas and Institutions, Mixed Signals and The Hidden Face of Rights.

In 2017, Sikkink released the essay Evidence for Hope: Making Human Rights Work in the 21st Century, in which she states that human rights institutions have been successful in their goals, despite their flaws and limitations, and will continue to deliver in the next years.

In 2021 she published International Norms, Moral Psychology, and Neuroscience with Richard Price of the University of British Columbia.
