= Brett Ashley Leeds =

American political scientist

- Education: University of North Carolina at Chapel Hill; Emory University
- Awards: Karl Deutsch Award, ISA; Lifetime Achievement Award in Conflict Processes, APSA
- Scientific career
- Fields: Political science
- Workplaces: Florida State University; Stanford University; Rice University

Brett Ashley Leeds is an American political scientist. She is a professor of political science at Rice University, where she has also been the chair of the department. She studies how domestic politics affect international conflict and cooperation, as well as international institutions. She specializes in how alliances between countries function, and how they help countries prevent wars.

== Early work and education ==
Leeds attended the University of North Carolina at Chapel Hill, earning a BA in political science in 1991. She then attended graduate school at Emory University, earning a PhD in 1998. Her dissertation, Comprehending Cooperation: Credible Commitments and International Relations, won the 1998 Walter Isard Award from the Peace Science Society for the best dissertation in Peace Science.

In 1997, Leeds became a professor of political science at Florida State University, remaining there until 2001 when she moved to the faculty at Rice University. She spent the 2005–2006 academic year at Stanford University.

== Career ==
Leeds has published peer-reviewed articles in journals like the American Journal of Political Science, the Journal of Politics, and International Studies Quarterly. Her work has focused on both the design and the effects of military alliances: she studies how governments structure security commitments, what determines whether or not leaders subsequently abide by those commitments, and how that affects military conflicts.

In 2015, Leeds was elected President of the International Studies Association for the 2017–2018 term. The following academic year she was elected President of the Peace Science Society.

In 2019, Leeds was awarded the Lifetime Achievement Award from the Conflict Processes Section of the American Political Science Association. Leeds also won the 2019 Herman Brown Distinguished Scholar Award from Texas Christian University, which recognizes a political scientist for outstanding scholarship and contributions to the discipline. Previously, Leeds was the recipient of the 2008 Karl Deutsch Award from the International Studies Association, which recognizes "significant contribution to the study of International Relations and Peace Research".

Work by Leeds has been cited in media outlets including The Washington Post, Vox, and Foreign Affairs.

== Selected works ==
- "Domestic political institutions, credible commitments, and international cooperation", American Journal of Political Science (1999)
- "Alliance treaty obligations and provisions, 1815-1944", International Interactions, with Jeffrey Ritter, Sara Mitchell, and Andrew Long (2002)
- "Alliance reliability in times of war: Explaining state decisions to violate treaties", International Organization (2003)

== Selected awards ==
- Lifetime Achievement Award, American Political Science Association Conflict Processes Section (2019)
- Herman Brown Distinguished Scholar Award, Texas Christian University (2019)
- Karl Deutsch Award, International Studies Association (2008)
