= International Relations of the Asia-Pacific =

- Discipline: International Relations Theory
- Language: English
- Edited by: Yoshihide Soeya; G. John Ikenberry

Publication details
- History: 2001–present
- Publisher: Oxford University Press
- Frequency: Triannual
- Impact factor: 1.233 (2018)

Standard abbreviations
- ISO 4: Int. Relat. Asia-Pac.

Indexing
- ISSN: 1470-482X (print); 1470-4838 (web)
- LCCN: 2001208520
- JSTOR: 1470482X
- OCLC no.: 47130410

Links
- Journal homepage; Online access; Online archive

International Relations of the Asia-Pacific is a triannual, peer-reviewed, academic journal, established in 2001, and published by the Oxford University Press on behalf of the Japan Association of International Relations (Japanese: Nihon Kokusai Seiji Gakkai, 日本国際政治学会), and assisted by HighWire Press.

It is also the official journal of the Japan Association of International Relations. The co-editors in chief are Yoshihide Soeya (Keio University) and G. John Ikenberry (Princeton University).

== Scope ==
The focus of this journal is significant developments in the Asia-Pacific region. Topics covered include China's politics, America's anti-terrorist war, America's place in the Asia-Pacific region, regional institutions, regional governance, Japan, Asian NGOs, China's relationship to the world economy, China's path of globalization, and China's national identification. Broad topical coverage encompasses international relations, Asia foreign relations, Pacific area relations.

The journal also functions as a forum for regional issues, points of view, presentation of scholarship, methodological approaches, schools of thought, and new ideas. Contributors work in all areas of the international relations field.

Publishing formats encompass original research (6,000 to 10,000 words), research notes (less than 10,000), book chapters, review essay articles (3,000–4,000), book reviews (600–1,000).

== Abstracting and indexing ==
The journal is abstracted and indexed in the International Bibliography of the Social Sciences, ProQuest, CSA Worldwide Political Science Abstracts, Scopus, and the Social Sciences Citation Index

According to the Journal Citation Reports, the journal has a 2014 impact factor of 0.758, ranking it 40th out of 115 journals in the category "Business".
