= Nicholas Onuf =

American scholar (born 1941)

Nicholas Onuf (born 1941) is an American scholar. Onuf is currently Professor Emeritus of International Relations at Florida International University and is on the editorial boards of International Political Sociology, Cooperation and Conflict, and Contexto Internacional. He is a constructivist scholar of international relations. He has been credited with coining the term "Constructivism."

== Thought ==
His best known contribution to constructivism is set out in World of Our Making (University of South Carolina Press, 1989). His premise is based on a continuum of performative language, rules and rule. Three types of speech act (instructive, directive, commissive) yield corresponding types of rules that, in turn, yield three types of rule (hegemony, hierarchy, heteronomy). Compliance with rules helps sustain rule, but failure to abide by them erodes rule. Rule, generally through institutionalized means, has distributive effects in political society (domestic or international), granting privileged access to material and symbolic resources to some agents over others.

One novelty of this approach is to go beyond the 'anarchy problematique' in IR (Richard Ashley's term). Instead of different types of anarchy (as in Alexander Wendt's Hobbesian, Lockean, and Kantian anarchichal settings), Onuf presents hegemony, hierarchy, and heteronomy as different structures of domination in world affairs (i.e. the absence of world government does not necessarily imply anarchy). These structures are respectively enabled by the repetition over time of behavior consistent with instructive, hierarchichal, and commissive rules by agents.

Instructive rules constitute reality: if one person utters the locution 'country X has moral superiority in world affairs', another person accepts it (illocution), and many other people act accordingly (perlocution), reality will have been constituted by this speech act. This may be converted into a number of instructive rules, which in turn, if followed over time, create, for instance, cultural hegemony. Hierarchichal rules work likewise but have to do with social relations based on force. Cold War spheres of influence are a classical example of their deployment in world affairs. Commissive rules create obligations for agents that would otherwise not exist: when an agent utters the locution 'I promise to make tariff cuts', such a statement can only exist in and through language and may be converted into a general rule. Such rules limit the agent's autonomy, resulting in a heteronomous structure of domination such as that found in the core-periphery setting of the world economy as expounded by Dependency Theory.

== Selected works ==
Onuf further developed and refined the ideas set out in World in a series of chapters in edited volumes:

- "A Constructivist Manifesto" in Burch & Denemark, eds., Constituting Political Economy (Lynne Rienner, 1997)
- "Constructivism: A User's Manual" in Kubálková, et al. eds., International Relations in a Constructed World (M.E. Sharpe, 1998)
- "Worlds of Our Own Making: The Strange Career of Constructivism" in Puchala, ed., Visions of International Relations (University of South Carolina Press, 2002).
