= Jeffrey Checkel =

American academic

- Born: Jeffrey T. Checkel; 1959 (age 66–67)
- Occupation: Professor of International Politics

Academic background
- Education: Massachusetts Institute of Technology

Academic work
- Discipline: International politics

Jeffrey T. Checkel is an American academic associated with the theory of constructivist school of international relations. He is currently professor and chair in International Politics at the European University Institute, Florence.

== Career ==
Checkel received his Bachelor of Science in Applied Physics from Cornell University in 1981 before completing a Ph.D. in Political Science from Massachusetts Institute of Technology in 1991. Prior to joining the European University Institute, he was a Professor for the School of International Studies at Simon Fraser University in Vancouver as well as the Simons Chair in International Law and Human Security. During this time, he was also an Adjunct Research Professor at the University of Oslo, and global fellow of the International Peace Research Institute, Oslo (PRIO). He is a pioneer of process tracing in political science and of the Constructivist approach. His other research interest includes international relations theory, European integration, conflict studies and qualitative methods. His books include Process Tracing: From Metaphor to Analytic Tool, Transnational Dynamics of Civil War, European Identity, International Institutions and Socialization in Europe, and Ideas and International Political Change: Soviet/Russian Behavior and the End of the Cold War. In 2015, he received the Humboldt Research Award and he is an associate editor of the Journal of Peace Research. Google Scholar ranks him as the 28th most-cited author in the field of International Relations, 12th most-cited author in the field of Qualitative Methods, and 2nd most-cited author in the field of Constructivism.

== Selected publications ==
- Bennett, A.& Checkel, J.T., Process tracing : from metaphor to analytic tool, Cambridge: New York: Cambridge University Press, 2015
- Checkel, J. T.. Transnational dynamics of civil war. Cambridge: Cambridge University Press, 2013.
- Checkel, J.T.. International institutions and socialization in Europe. New York: Cambridge University Press, 2007.
- Checkel, J.T.. Ideas and international political change Soviet/Russian behavior and the end of the Cold War. New Haven: Yale University Press, 1997
