= Peter J. Katzenstein =

German-US political scientist (b. 1945)

Peter J. Katzenstein FBA
- Born: Peter Joachim Katzenstein; February 17, 1945 (age 81); Hamburg, Germany
- Citizenship: United States (since 1979)
- Spouse: Mary Fainsod Katzenstein (m. 1970)
- Children: 2
- Awards: Johan Skytte Prize (2020)

Academic background
- Education: Swarthmore College (BA); London School of Economics (MSc); Harvard University (PhD)
- Influences: Karl Deutsch

Academic work
- Discipline: Political science
- Sub-discipline: International relations
- School or tradition: Constructivism
- Institutions: Cornell University; University of Massachusetts, Amherst; Harvard University
- Influenced: Bruce Jentleson, David A. Lake, Louis Pauly, Joseph Grieco, Rawi Abdelal

Peter Joachim Katzenstein FBA (born February 17, 1945) is a German-American political scientist. He is the Walter S. Carpenter, Jr. Professor of International Studies at Cornell University. Katzenstein has made influential contributions to the fields of comparative politics, international relations, and international political economy.

His main concentration lies in the study of culture, religion, identity, and regionalism in the interstate system, for which he is known as a proponent of constructivist thinking. He is often associated with the school of neoliberal institutionalism through his joint projects with Robert Keohane. He is known for his influential research on corporatism.

== Early life and education ==
Peter Katzenstein was born on February 17, 1945, in Hamburg, Germany. He moved to the United States at the age of nineteen.

Katzenstein was educated in Germany in Gelehrtenschule des Johanneums before moving to the United States, where he ended up receiving a B.A. from Swarthmore College in 1967, majoring in political science, economics, and literature. While at Swarthmore, he took a class alongside fellow students Margaret Levi and David Laitin, who would both go on to become prominent political scientists. The next year he earned an M.Sc. from the London School of Economics, and six years later he received his Ph.D. from Harvard University with thesis titled Disjoined Partners: Austria and Germany since 1815.

At Harvard University, Katzenstein was strongly influenced by Karl Deutsch who was the main reason by Katzenstein applied for graduate studies at Harvard in the first place.

== Career ==
His first stint as teacher came in 1971 when he served as a teaching fellow in the Government Department at Harvard. The following year he became a part-time instructor in comparative politics of Western Europe at the University of Massachusetts. From 1973 to 1977 he served as an assistant professor of government at Cornell, before becoming an associate professor for three years until 1980. From 1980 to 1987 he was a professor of government, before finally accepting the position he holds to this day as the Walter S. Carpenter, Jr. Professor of International Studies at Cornell University.

Katzenstein served as president of the American Political Science Association (2008–2009). He was elected to the American Academy of Arts and Sciences in 1987 and the American Philosophical Society in 2009. He was the recipient of the 1974 Helen Dwight Reid Award of the American Political Science Association for the best dissertation in international relations; of the American Political Science Association's 1986 Woodrow Wilson prize for the best book published in the United States on international affairs; and, together with Nobuo Okawara, of the 1993 Masayoshi Ohira Memorial Prize. One of his edited volumes, The Culture of National Security, was selected by Choice magazine as one of the top ten books in international relations in 1997. Katzenstein has been a Fellow at the Princeton Institute for Advanced Study, the Stanford Center for Advanced Study in the Behavioral Sciences, the Russell Sage Foundation, the Woodrow Wilson Center and the Wissenschaftskolleg zu Berlin. In addition he has held numerous fellowships, and he continues to serve on the editorial boards and academic advisory committees of various journals and organizations, both in the United States and abroad.

Katzenstein was editor of the journal International Organization, the leading IR journal, from 1980 to 1986. Since 1982 Katzenstein has served as the editor of over 100 books that Cornell University Press has published under the imprint of the Cornell Studies in Political Economy. Katzenstein is an influential figure in the field of International Political Economy.

Since joining the Cornell Government Department in 1973, Katzenstein has chaired or been a member of more than one hundred dissertation committees. He received Stephen and Margery Russell Distinguished Teaching Award from Cornell University College of Arts and Sciences in 1993, and, in recognition of sustained and distinguished undergraduate teaching, was made one of Cornell University's Stephen H. Weiss Presidential Fellows in 2004.

He was elected as a Corresponding Fellow of the British Academy in 2015. He is a member of the Council on Foreign Relations.

Katzenstein strongly influenced David Lake, Louis Pauly, Joseph Grieco and Rawi Abdelal. In 2020, he was the recipient of the prestigious Johan Skytte Prize in Political Science.

== Personal life ==
In 1970, he married Mary Fainsod Katzenstein, an American political scientist. They have two children, and reside in Ithaca, New York. He speaks German and English. He became a U.S. citizen in 1979.

== Publications ==
Katzenstein has written or served as a primary editor of nearly 40 books. His Anti-Americanism in World Politics (Cornell University Press, 2007) was co-authored with Robert Keohane; his best-known work, A World of Regions: Asia and Europe in the American Imperium, was published in 2005. His Comparing Policy Network: Labor Politics in the U.S., Germany and Japan (Cambridge University Press, 1995) was co-authored with Yutaka Tsujinaka.

- Katzenstein, Peter J., ed. (2018). Protean Power. Cambridge Studies in International Relations. Cambridge University Press. doi:10.1017/9781108597456. ISBN 978-1-108-59745-6.
  - Katzenstein, Peter J., ed. (2018). "Slumdog versus Superman: Uncertainty, Innovation, and the Circulation of Powerin the Global Film Industry". 10 - Slumdog versus Superman: Uncertainty, Innovation, and the Circulation of Power in the Global Film Industry. Cambridge Studies in International Relations. Cambridge University Press. pp. 209–226. doi:10.1017/9781108597456.011. ISBN 978-1-108-59745-6.
