= Margaret Weir =

American sociologist and political scientist

Margaret M. Weir
- Born: July 17, 1952 (age 74)
- Education: University of Chicago (Ph.D.)
- Scientific career
- Fields: Political sociology Social policy Urban politics in the United States
- Workplaces: University of California, Berkeley; Brookings Institution; Brown University

Margaret M. Weir (born July 17, 1952) is an American political scientist and sociologist, best known for her work on social policy and the politics of poverty in the United States, particularly at the levels of state and local government.

== Career ==
Weir is currently a professor at Brown University. She was a professor of political science and sociology at the University of California, Berkeley, where her research and teaching fields included American political development, urban politics and policy, political sociology, and comparative studies of the welfare state. She is also a nonresident senior fellow at the Brookings Institution, where she had served previously as a senior fellow in governmental studies, from 1992 to 1997. From 1985 to 1992, she was a faculty member at Harvard University in the Department of Government.

Weir is currently involved in a number of organizations. She is director of the Building Resilient Regions Network, which is funded by the MacArthur Foundation. At the Scholars Strategy Network, she is co-director of the Bay Area regional network and a regular contributor of briefs. She also serves on the advisory board at the Center for Labor Research and Education (UC Berkeley Labor Center).

Weir has written widely on social policy and politics in the United States. In Politics and Jobs: The Boundaries of Employment Policy in the United States (Princeton University Press, 1992), she addresses the power of ideas in policymaking and the politics of interest formation in order to explain the persistence of lacking employment policy in the United States. With Ira Katznelson, Weir coauthored Schooling for All: Class, Race, and the Decline of the Democratic Ideal (Basic Books, 1985), which focuses on public school systems in Chicago and San Francisco in order to examine equal access to education as a dwindling civil right. Weir has also edited several volumes, including The Politics of Social Policy in the United States with Ann Shola Orloff and Theda Skocpol (Princeton University Press, 1988).

Weir's chapter "Creating Justice for the Poor in the New Metropolis," from Justice and the American Metropolis (University of Minnesota Press, 2011) was the topic of discussion on the radio show Against the Grain on January 10, 2012.

In 2004, Weir received an Investigator Award from the Robert Wood Johnson Foundation for work on American health policy reform.

== Selected bibliography ==
- Weir, Margaret. 2011. "Creating Justice for the Poor in the New Metropolis" in Justice and the American Metropolis ed. Clarissa Hayward and Todd Swanstrom. University of Minnesota Press. 237–256.
- Weir, Margaret and Sarah Reckhow. 2011. "Building a Stronger Regional Safety Net: Philanthropy's Role." Metropolitan Opportunity Series, Brookings Institution.
- Weir, Margaret, Benjamin Ginsberg, and Theodore Lowi. 2010. We the People (eighth edition). W.W. Norton & Company, Inc.
- Weir, Margaret. 2006. "When Does Politics Create Policy? The Organizational Politics of Change" in Rethinking Political Institutions: The Art of the State ed. Ian Shapiro, Stephen Skowronek, and Daniel Galvin. New York University Press. 171–186.
- Weir, Margaret. 2005. "States, Race, and the Decline of New Deal Liberalism." Studies in American Political Development 19(2):157-172.
- Weir, Margaret, Harold Wolman, and Todd Swanstrom. 2005. "The Calculus of Coalitions: Cities, Suburbs, and the Metropolitan Agenda." Urban Affairs Review 40(6):730-760.
- Weir, Margaret. 2002. "Income Polarization and California's Social Contract" in The State of California Labor ed. Ruth Milkman. University of California Press. 97–131.
- Weir, Margaret. 2002. "The American Middle Class and the Politics of Education" in Social Contracts Under Stress ed. Olivier Zunz, Leonard Schoppa, and Nobuhiro Hiwatari. Russell Sage Foundation. 178–203.
- Weir, Margaret. 2001. "The Political Collapse of Bill Clinton's Third Way" in New Labour ed. Stuart White. Palgrave Macmillan. 137–148.
- Weir, Margaret. 2000. "Coalition-building for Regionalism" in Reflections on Regionalism ed. Bruce J. Katz. Brookings Institution Press. 127–153.
- Weir, Margaret. 2000. "Planning, Environmentalism, and Urban Poverty: The Political Failure of National Land Use Planning Legislation, 1970-1975" in The American Planning Tradition: Culture and Policy ed. Robert Fishman. Woodrow Wilson Center Press. 193–215.
- Weir, Margaret. 1999. "Politics, Money, and Power in Community Development" in Urban Problems and Community Development eds. Ronald F. Ferguson and William T. Dickens. Brookings Institution Press. 139–192.
- Weir, Margaret (ed.). 1998. The Social Divide: Party Politics and the Future of Activist Government. Brookings Institution and Russell Sage Press.
- Weir, Margaret and Marshall Ganz. 1997. "Reconnecting People and Politics" in The New Majority ed. Stanley Greenberg and Theda Skocpol. Yale University Press. 149–171.
- Weir, Margaret. 1995. "The Politics of Urban Racial Isolation in Europe and America" in Classifying By Race ed. Paul E. Peterson. Princeton University Press. 217–243.
- Weir, Margaret. 1992. Politics and Jobs: The Boundaries of Employment Policy in the United States. Princeton University Press.
- Weir, Margaret, Ann Shola Orloff, and Theda Skocpol (eds.) 1988. The Politics of Social Policy in the United States. Princeton University Press.
- Weir, Margaret and Ira Katznelson. 1985. Schooling for All: Class, Race and the Decline of the Democratic Ideal. Basic Books.
