= Skocpol =

Skocpol is a surname. Notable people with the surname include:

- Theda Skocpol (born 1947), American sociologist and political scientist
- William Skocpol (born 1946), American physicist
