= Varieties of Capitalism =

Book by David Soskice and Peter A. Hall

Varieties of Capitalism: The Institutional Foundations of Comparative Advantage
- Editors: Peter Hall, David Soskice
- Language: English
- Subject: Capitalism, institutional economics, comparative economic systems, comparative advantage
- Publisher: Oxford University Press
- Publication date: 2001
- Publication place: United Kingdom
- Pages: 540 pp (first edition)
- ISBN: 0-19-924774-9
- Dewey Decimal: 330.12/2
- LC Class: HB501 .V355 2001

Varieties of Capitalism: The Institutional Foundations of Comparative Advantage is a 2001 book on economics, political economy, and comparative politics edited by political economists Peter A. Hall and David Soskice. The book established an influential debate among political economists about ways to categorize, qualify and analyze different ways in which economies are organized.

== Contents ==
Varieties of Capitalism includes an introductory chapter by Hall and Soskice, as well as further chapters by Kathleen Thelen, Robert J. Franzese, Jr., Margarita Estevez‐Abe, Torben Iversen, Soskice, Isabela Mares, Orfeo Fioretos, Stewart Wood, Pepper D. Culpepper, Robert C. Hancké, Sigurt Vitols, Mark Lehrer, Steven Casper, Gunther Teubner, and Jay Tate.

In their introductory chapter, "An Introduction to Varieties of Capitalism", Hall and Soskice set out two distinct types of market economy that implement capitalism: liberal market economies (LME) (e.g. US, UK, Canada, Australia, New Zealand, Ireland) and coordinated market economies (CME) (e.g. Germany, France, Japan, Sweden, Austria).

Those two types can be distinguished by the primary way in which firms coordinate with each other and other actors, such as trade unions. In LMEs, firms primarily coordinate their endeavours by way of hierarchies and market mechanisms. Coordinated market economies rely more heavily on non-market forms of interaction in the coordination of their relationships with other actors. The authors considered five spheres in which firms must develop relationships with others:

- Industrial relations — Companies have to coordinate with their workers, trade unions and other employers over wage and productivity. CMEs generally have a higher level of membership in trade unions and employers organizations, and bargaining over wages tends to happen at the industry, sectoral, or national level. Conversely in LMEs, workers and employers are often less organized, and wage negotiations take place at the company level (the interview and hiring process).
- Vocational training and education — In CMEs, workers tend to have specific skills that are tied to the firm or the industry they are working in. In LMEs, workers have more general skills that easily can be used to work at other companies.
- Corporate governance — Firms in CMEs rely more on patient capital, i.e. capital that does not totally depend on financial openness and short-term return on investment (ROI). LMEs tend to rely more heavily on public information about finances and short-term capital, such as stock markets.
- Inter-firm relations — Inter-firm relations in CMEs tend to be more collaborative, while inter-firm relations in LMEs are more competitive and arms-length.
- Relations with employees — In CMEs, managers often have to cooperate with employees to reach major decisions, while in LMEs, there are often more adversarial relations between management and employees, in which managers are the prime decision-makers.

Varieties of Capitalism offers a new framework for understanding the institutional similarities among and differences between the developed economies, since national political economies can be compared based on the way in which firms resolve the coordination problems they face in these five spheres. The two models (CMEs and LMEs) are considered ‘ideal types’ at the pole ends of a spectrum, along which many nations can be arrayed; i.e. even within these two types, there may be significant variations in national political economies. For instance, by categorizing the different OECD countries into LMEs and CMEs, Hall and Soskice identify another type - ‘Mediterranean capitalism’ (e.g. France, Italy, Spain, Portugal, Greece and Turkey). Mediterranean capitalist political economies are said to have market arrangements in labour relations but non-market coordination in capital procurement as a result of a large agrarian sector and extensive state interventions in recent history. Extending the scope of Hall and Soskice's framework to countries outside Western Europe and the US, other authors have developed different varieties of capitalism, such as dependent market economies, and hierarchical market economies.

According to the book, institutions are shaped not only by the legal system, but by informal rules or common knowledge acquired by actors through history and culture of one nation. Institutional complementarities suggest that nations with a particular type of institution then develop complementary institutions in other spheres. (For example: countries with stock market liberalization have less labour protection, and vice versa.) Firms of liberal and coordinated market economies respond very differently to a similar shock (an economic cycle), and institutions are socializing^{(?)} agencies, and go through a continuous processes of adaptation.

Institutional arrangements of a nation's political economy tend to push its companies toward particular kinds of corporate strategy. Thus, the two types of economy have different capacities for innovation, and tend to distribute income and employment differently.

Criteria	Liberal market economy	Coordinated market economy
Mechanism	Competitive market arrangements	Non-market relations
Equilibrium	Demand-supply and hierarchy	Strategic interaction among firms and other actors
Inter-firm relations	Competitive	Collaborative
Mode of production	Direct product competition	Differentiated, niche production
Legal system	Complete and formal contracting	Incomplete and informal contracting
Institutions' function	Competitiveness; Freer movement of inputs	Monitoring; Sanctioning of defectors
Employment conditions	Full-time, general skill Short-term, fluid	Shorter hours, specific skill Long-term, immobile
Wage bargain	Firm level (when hiring)	Industry level (industrial action)
Training and education	Formal education from high schools and colleges	Apprenticeship imparting industry-specific skills
Unionization rate	Low	High
Income distribution	Unequal (high Gini)	Equal (low Gini)
Innovation	Radical	Incremental
Comparative advantages	High-tech and service	Manufacturing
Policies	Deregulation, anti-trust, tax-break	Encourages information sharing and collaboration of firms

Examples of LMEs are the US and the UK, while Scandinavian countries are typically of CMEs. Germany was often described as an CME, but following the Hartz reforms, this viewpoint has become highly contestable.

== Reception ==
British Labour Party politician, Ed Miliband, was heavily influenced by Varieties of Capitalism during his time as Leader of the Opposition. Miliband campaigned to become Prime Minister with the vision of transforming the British economy from the Liberal Market Economy it currently is to a Coordinated Market Economy - which he believed would be more equitable but retain economic competitiveness. David Soskice disagreed arguing that "to be successful... you need to show that you're a party which understands what are the sectors" that deliver more university-driven growth, whereas Colin Crouch was more sympathetic to Miliband's vision, stating that "it is possible for human beings... to try [and change the UK's type of capitalism]".

Colin Crouch criticizes the deterministic nature of Varieties of Capitalism where “actors seem to exist in an iron cage of institutions, which they cannot change”. Crouch argues that “institutional entrepreneurs” frequently adjust the institutional framework which is viewed as stable in Varieties of Capitalism, citing examples such as Silicon Valley and Thatcherism. Authors observe that many of the CMEs have been unstable since the 1990s and subject to institutional change and policy drift, including the archetypal Germany.

Varieties of Capitalism has been criticized for its claim that economies perform best economically when exhibiting institutional frameworks that are ideal-types of CMEs and LMEs. This claim was developed further by Peter Hall and Daniel Gingerich who claim to find higher levels of economic growth in countries with institutions which match each other in terms of being CME or LME-types. Mark Blyth responds to this implicit explanation of the Eurosclerosis found in Southern European states, with their mixed institutions, by arguing that many of those countries have not actually underperformed the US and that unemployment metrics are not cross-comparable when considering the US’s mass incarceration. Mark Taylor has questioned Soskice and Hall’s claim that ideal-types of CMEs and LMEs show innovative specialization in different subject areas. The empirical results in Soskice and Hall’s book are driven by a major outlier in innovation output – the US – with other LMEs not showing any distinct innovation patterns from CMEs or intermediate countries. Other research provides more mixed support for the central thesis of the Varieties of Capitalism approach, highlighting how some sectors in different countries conform to expectations, while others do not. The approach continues to influence important work in the area of socio-economics, including how institutions structure firms' and countries' responses to the climate emergency. Work has also sought to highlight the similarities and differences between the Varieties of Capitalism approach and related frameworks, such as historical institutionalism and regulation theory

== See also ==
- Social market economy
- Anglo-Saxon model
