= Research4Impact =

U.S. nonprofit organization

- Abbreviation: r4i
- Founders: Adam Seth Levine, Jake Bowers, and Donald Green
- Type: Nonprofit
- Purpose: Initiate new collaborations between researchers, nonprofit practitioners, and policymakers to better understand and effectively solve problems
- Members: 1439 (2021)
- Website: www.r4impact.org

Research4Impact is a U.S. based nonprofit organization that matches academic researchers with practitioners so that they might work together on pressing problems in both private and public spheres.

== Background ==
Researchers, practitioners, and policymakers often want to collaborate with each other to better understand and solve problems of mutual concern (e.g., poverty, economic development, climate change, land use, environmental challenges, voter engagement), but they are part of distinct social networks and do not always know how to find or relate to one another. After hearing about these challenges, Adam Seth Levine, Jake Bowers, and Donald Green established Research4Impact in 2017 with the aim of fostering both informal and formal collaborations, launching the organization's website in February 2018.

== Activities ==
=== Matchmaking ===
Research4Impact leverages an evidence-based approach to matchmaking called the Research Impact Through Matchmaking (RITM) method. RITM is based on organizational diversity and emphasizes relationship building in addition to information sharing and has also been adopted by Scholars Strategy Network chapters. In the case of Research4Impact, individuals may contact the organization and ask to be matched with peers. Volunteer staff members then provide a matchmaking service based on responses to anonymized blurbs shared in the organization's newsletter. As of 2021, Research4Impact has generated more than 300 matches.

=== Research ===
Sharing what Research4Impact has learned about facilitating relationships between researchers and practitioners is one of the organization's main goals and activities. This is done through articles, one page briefs, impact stories, and peer reviewed publications.

=== Workshops ===
Research4Impact offers workshops for participants who want to learn how to establish and build collaborations.
