= Historical institutionalism =

Social science approach

Historical institutionalism (HI) is a new institutionalist social science approach that emphasizes how timing, sequences and path dependence affect institutions, and shape social, political, economic behavior and change. Unlike functionalist theories and some rational choice approaches, historical institutionalism tends to emphasize that many outcomes are possible, small events and flukes can have large consequences, actions are hard to reverse once they take place, and that outcomes may be inefficient. A critical juncture may set in motion events that are hard to reverse, because of issues related to path dependency. Historical institutionalists tend to focus on history (longer temporal horizons) to understand why specific events happen.

The term "Historical Institutionalism" began appearing in publications in the early 1990s, although it had been used in the late 1980s. The most widely cited historical institutionalist scholars are Peter Hall, Paul Pierson, Theda Skocpol, Douglass North, and Kathleen Thelen. Prominent works of historical institutionalist scholarship have used both sociological and rationalist methods. Due to a focus on events involving causal complexity (equifinality, complex interaction effects and path dependency), historical institutionalist works tend to employ detailed comparative case studies.

== Old and new institutionalism ==
Kathleen Thelen and Sven Steinmo contrast New Institutionalism with "Old Institutionalism", which was overwhelmingly focused on detailed narratives of institutions, with little focus on comparative analyses. Thus, the Old Institutionalism was unhelpful for comparative research and explanatory theory. This "Old Institutionalism" began to be undermined when scholars increasingly highlighted how the formal rules and administrative structures of institutions were not accurately describing the behavior of actors and policy outcomes.

Works, such as Karl Polanyi's The Great Transformation, Theda Skocpol's States and Social Revolutions, Philippe Schmitter's Still a Century of Corporatism?, Barrington Moore's Social Origins of Dictatorship and Democracy, and Evans, Ruschemeyer and Skocpol's Bringing the State Back In have been characterized as precursors to Historical Institutionalism, spawning a new research program.

Historical institutionalism is a predominant approach in research on the welfare state. In the field of International Relations, John Ikenberry's After Victory and Abraham Newman's Protectors of Privacy are prominent works of historical institutionalist scholarship.

== The treatment of history ==
Unlike most western scholars who preceded them, including classical liberals, classical Marxists, empiricists, dialectical thinkers and positivists, historical institutionalists do not accept that history necessarily develops in a straightforward, linear fashion. Instead, they examine the conditions under which a particular trajectory was followed and not others, a phenomenon that Gabriel Almond refers to as the "historical cure". As a consequence, specifying why particular paths were not taken is as important as specifying the actual trajectory of history.

As opposed to the old institutionalists, they postulate that history will not necessarily lead to a "happy" outcome (i.e. "fascism or democracy as the end of history").

Historical institutionalist works tend to reject functionalist accounts of institutions. Therefore, they are suspicious of explanations for the emergence of institutions that work backwards from the functions of institutions to their origins. Historical institutionalists tend to see origins behind the creation of institutions as the result of conflict and contestation, which then gets locked in and persists, even if the circumstances that resulted in the institution change.

=== Mechanisms of institutional stability ===
The concept of path dependence is essential to historical institutionalist analyses. Due to path dependence, institutions may have considerable stability and "stickiness", even in situations when the institutional leads to suboptimal arrangements. For Paul Pierson, path dependence entails that “outcomes at a ‘critical juncture’ trigger feedback mechanisms [negative or positive] that reinforce the recurrence of a particular pattern into the future.” Thus, path dependence makes it harder to reverse once a certain path has been taken, because there are increased costs to switching from the path. These paths may lead to outcomes are inefficient, but nonetheless persist, because of the costs involved in making substantial overhauls. An example of this is the QWERTY keyboard layout, which was efficient for typewriters to prevent jams in the 19th century and was implemented in computer keyboards in the 20th century. However, the QWERTY keyboard is arguably not as efficient as a computer keyboard could be, but the keyboard layout has persisted over time due to the costs involved in overhauling computer keyboards. Jacob Hacker and Paul Pierson argue that other approaches to institutions may fall guilty of treating politics as if it were the film Groundhog Day where each day the participants just start over; in reality, past politics and policy legacies shape the interests, incentives, power and organizational abilities of political actors.

According to Paul Pierson, the following factors contribute to institutional stability:

- Large setup costs: actors may stick with existing institutions because there are large setup costs associated with creating new ones
- Learning effects: actors may stick with existing institutions because it is costly to learn about procedures and processes in new institutions
- Coordination effects: actors may stick with existing institutions because it is too complex to coordinate multiple actors into creating new institutions
- Adaptive expectations: actors may expend resources on an institution over another because it is likely to stay or become the dominant institution

These factors entail that actors have devoted resources into developing certain institution-specific skills and are unlikely to expend resources on alternative institutions.

A related crux of historical institutionalism is that temporal sequences matter: outcomes depend upon the timing of exogenous factors (such as inter-state competition or economic crisis) in relation to particular institutional configurations (such as the level of bureaucratic professionalism or degree of state autonomy from class forces). For example, Theda Skocpol suggests that the democratic outcome of the English Civil War was a result of the fact that the comparatively weak English Crown lacked the military capacity to fight the landed upper-class. In contrast, the rise of rapid industrialization and fascism in Prussia when faced with international security threats was because the Prussian state was a “highly bureaucratic and centralized agrarian state” composed by “men closely ties to landed notables”. Thomas Ertman, in his account of state building in medieval and early modern Europe, argues that variations in the type of regime built in Europe during this period can be traced to one macro-international factor and two historical institutional factors. At the macro-structural level, the “timing of the onset of sustained geopolitical competition” created an atmosphere of insecurity that appeared best addressed by consolidating state power. The timing of the onset of competition is critical for Ertman's explanation. States that faced competitive pressures early had to consolidate through patrimonial structures, since the development of modern bureaucratic techniques had not yet arrived. States faced with competitive pressures later on the other hand, could take advantage of advancements in training and knowledge to promote a more technically oriented civil service.

An important element to historical institutionalism is that it may cement certain distributions of power or increase asymmetries of power through policy feedbacks, "lock in" effects and stickiness. For example, France has a permanent seat on the UN Security Council because of its power and status at the end of World War II, yet it would likely not get a permanent seat if the UN Security Council were re-designed decades later.

=== Mechanisms of institutional change ===
Historical institutionalists have identified major shocks, such as wars and revolutions, as important factors that lead to institutional change because those shocks create "critical junctures" whereby certain path dependencies get created. One prominent account in this vein is John Ikenberry's work on international orders which argues that after major wars, the dominant powers set up world orders that are favorable to their interests.

Aside from shocks, historical institutionalists have also identified numerous factors that subtly lead to institutional change. These include:

- Layering: grafting new rules onto old rules
- Displacement: when relevant actors leave existing institutions and go to new or alternative institutions
- Conversion: old rules are reinterpreted and redirected to apply to new goals, functions and purposes
- Drift: old rules fail to apply to situations that they were intended for because of changing social conditions
- Exhaustion: an institution overextends itself to the point that it does not have the capacity to fulfill its purposes and ultimately breaks down

As part of these subtle changes, there may be widespread noncompliance with the formal rules of an institution, prompting change. There may also be shifts in the balance of power between the social coalitions that comprise the institution.

== Reception ==
Historical institutionalism is not a unified intellectual enterprise (see also new institutionalism). Some scholars are oriented towards treating history as the outcome of rational and purposeful behavior based on the idea of equilibrium (see rational choice). They rely heavily on quantitative approaches and formal theory. Others, more qualitative oriented scholars, reject the idea of rationality and instead emphasize the idea that randomness and accidents matter in political and social outcomes. There are unsolvable epistemological differences between both approaches. However given the historicity of both approaches, and given their focus on institutions, both can fall under "historical institutionalism".

Munck argues that work that emphasizes critical junctures as causes has two problems: (i) the problem of infinite regress (the notion that the cause of events can constantly be pushed back further in time), and (ii) the problem of distal non-recurring causes (convincingly arguing that a distant non-recurring event caused a much later event).

Avner Greif and David Laitin have criticized the notion of increased returns.

Sociological institutionalists and ideational scholars have criticized versions of Historical Institutionalism that adopt materialist and rationalist ontologies. Scholars who use ideational approaches argue that institutional change occurs during episodes when institutions are perceived be failing (such as during economic crises) or during episodes of uncertainty, as this creates room for an exchange of ideas and a receptivity for institutional change. Political scientists such as Henry Farrell, Martha Finnemore, Mark Blyth, Oddny Helgadóttir, and William Kring argue that Historical Institutionalism has over time tended to engage more with rational choice institutionalism than with sociological institutionalism. Vincent Pouliot similarly writes that "soft rational choice... informs most versions of [Historical Institutionalism]." According to Michael Zurn, Historical institutionalism "lacks a theory of action."

In Paradigms and Sand Castles, an influential book on research design in comparative politics, Barbara Geddes argues that there are methodological limits to the kind of path-dependent arguments that is often found in Historical Institutionalist research. She argues that it is hard to rule out rival explanations for a proposed outcome and to precisely identify one purported critical juncture or another.

== Major institutionalist scholars and books ==
- Perry Anderson, Lineages of the Absolutist State
- Kenneth A. Armstrong & Simon Bulmer, The governance of the Single European Market
- Reinhard Bendix, Nation Building and Citizenship: Studies of our Changing Social Order
- Suzanne Berger, Peasants Against Politics
- Ruth Berins Collier and David Collier, Shaping the Political Arena
- Thomas Ertman, Birth of the Leviathan
- Peter B Evans, Embedded Autonomy
- Alexander Gerschenkron, Economic Backwardness in Historical Perspective
- Peter A. Hall, Governing the Economy
- Samuel P. Huntington, Political Order in Changing Societies
- John Ikenberry, After Victory
- Chalmers Johnson, Peasant Nationalism and Communist Power
- Peter Katzenstein, Cultural Norms and National Security
- Atul Kohli, The State and Development in the Third World
- Stephen Krasner, Sovereignty: Organized Hypocrisy
- Margaret Levi, Consent, Dissent and Patriotism
- Gregory Luebbert, Liberalism Fascism and Social Democracy
- Ian Lustick, Unsettled States, Disputed Lands
- Joel S. Migdal, Strong Societies and Weak State
- Barrington Moore, Social Origins of Dictatorship and Democracy
- Douglass North, Institutions, Institutional Change and Economic Performance
- Paul Pierson, Politics in Time
- Karl Polanyi, The Great Transformation
- Dietrich Rueschemeyer, Evelyne Huber, and John D. Stephens, Capitalist Development and Democracy
- James C. Scott, Seeing Like a State
- Theda Skocpol, States and Social Revolutions, Protecting Soldiers and Mothers
- Philip Selznick, "Institutionalism 'Old' and 'New'". Administrative Science Quarterly 41 (2): 270–77
- Stephen Skowronek, The Politics Presidents Make
- Rogers Smith, Civic Ideals
- Sven Steinmo, Taxation and Democracy, The Evolution of Modern States
- Kathleen Thelen, How Institutions Evolve?
- Charles Tilly, Coercion, Capital, and European States, AD 990–1992
- Stephen Van Evera, Causes of War
- Thorstein Veblen, An Inquiry into the Nature of Peace and the Terms of Its Perpetuation
- Rorden Wilkinson, The WTO: Crisis and the Governance of Global Trade
- Daniel Ziblatt, Structuring the State
- John Zysman, Governments, Markets, and Growth: Financial Systems and Politics of Industrial Change.
- Francis Fukuyama, The Origins of Political Order

== See also ==
- Critical juncture theory
- Liberal institutionalism
- Institutional economics
- New institutional economics
- Rational Choice Institutionalism
- Analytic narrative
