= Institutionalism =

Institutionalism may refer to:

- Institutional theory, an approach to the study of politics that focuses on formal institutions of government
- New institutionalism, a social theory that focuses on developing a sociological view of institutions, the way they interact and the effects of institutions on society
  - Institutional economics, an economic school approaching economic issues from a macro sociological point of view
  - New institutional economics, an economic school that analyzes social norms, organizational arrangements etc.
  - Historical institutionalism, a social science method of inquiry that uses institutions as subject of study in order to find, measure and trace patterns and sequences of social, political, economic behavior and change across time and space
- Liberal institutionalism, an approach to international organizations in international relations
