= Ben Ross (disambiguation) =

Ben Ross (born 1980) is an Australian rugby league footballer.

Ben Ross may also refer to:

- C. Ben Ross (1876–1946), Governor of Idaho
- Ben Ross (Australian rules footballer) (born 1988)
- Ben Ross (baseball) (born 2001), American baseball infielder
- Ben Ross (freed lumberman) (died 1871), father of Harriet Tubman
- Ben Barron Ross (1921–2016), American politician
- Benjamin Ross, British writer and film director

== See also ==
- Ben Ross Schneider, American political scientist
- William Benjamin Ross (1855–1929), Canadian politician, lawyer and businessman
- Benjamin Ross Hayden (born 1989), Canadian actor and film director
- Ross Benjamin, American translator
