= Peter A. Hall =

Krupp Foundation Professor of European Studies

Peter A. Hall FBA
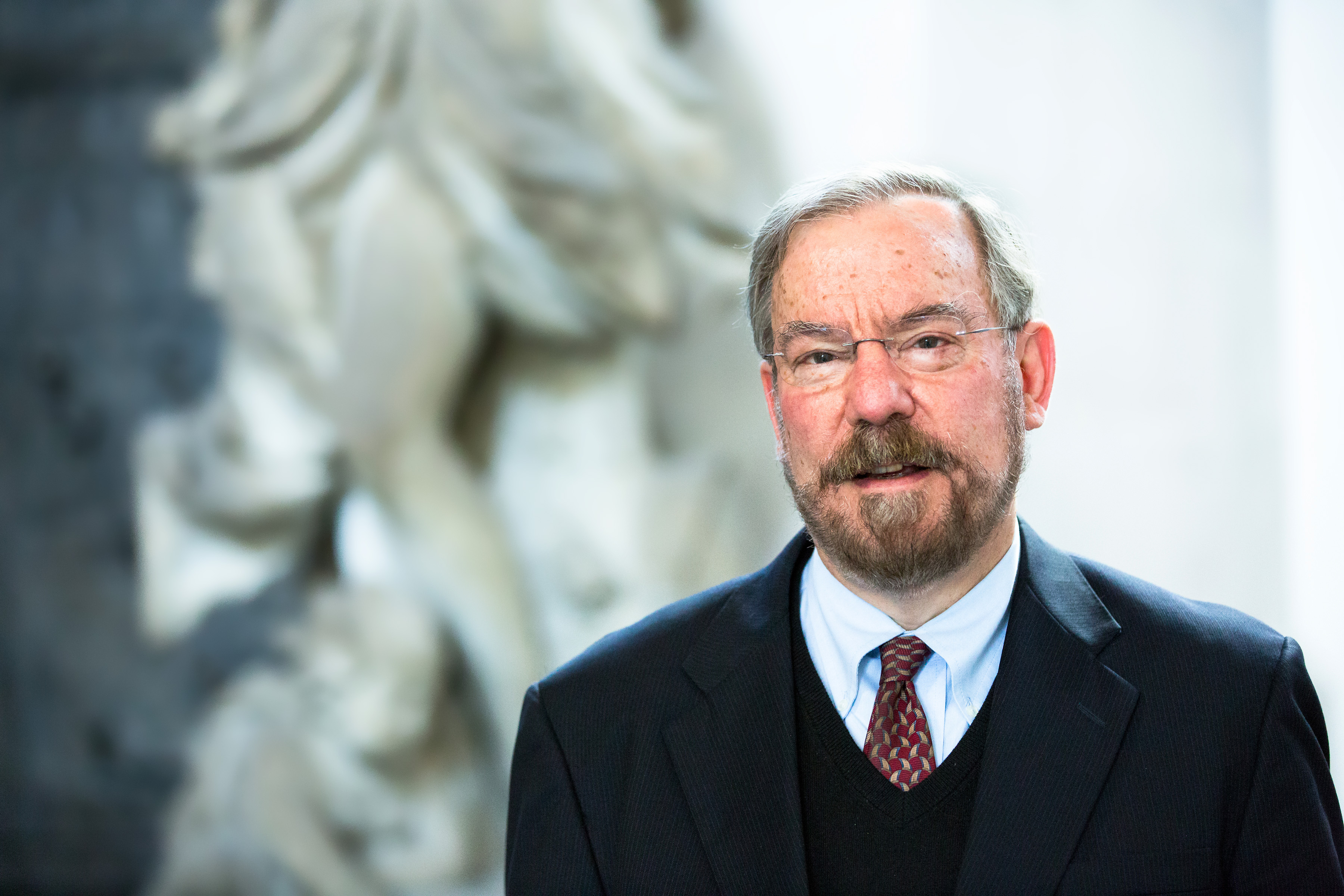
- Born: Peter Andrew Hall
- Awards: Guggenheim Fellowship; Chevalier of the Ordre des Palmes Académiques

Academic background
- Education: University of Toronto (BA); Balliol College, Oxford (MPhil); Harvard University (AM, PhD)

Academic work
- Discipline: Political science Comparative political economy
- Sub-discipline: Historical institutionalism Comparative capitalism
- Institutions: Harvard University
- Notable works: Varieties of Capitalism (2001); The Political Power of Economic Ideas (1989)
- Website: hall.scholars.harvard.edu

Peter A. Hall FBA is a Canadian political scientist and comparative political economist. He is the Krupp Foundation Professor of European studies at Harvard University. Hall is best known for his work on comparative capitalism, historical institutionalism, and the political economy of advanced democracies, including his co-edited volume Varieties of Capitalism (2001), which has been widely cited across the social sciences.

== Early life and education ==
Hall earned his B.A. in political science and economics from the University of Toronto. He completed an M.Phil. in politics at Balliol College, Oxford, followed by an A.M. and Ph.D. in political science at Harvard University, where he received his doctorate in 1982.

== Academic career ==
Hall has spent the majority of his academic career at Harvard University. He was appointed Professor of Government in 1989 and served as the Frank G. Thomson Professor of Government from 1999 to 2001. In 2001, he was named the Krupp Foundation Professor of European Studies.

He served as the Director of the Minda de Gunzburg Center for European Studies at Harvard from 2001 to 2006. Additionally, he held the position of Co-Director of the Program on Successful Societies for the Canadian Institute for Advanced Research (CIFAR) from 2003 to 2017.

In addition to his permanent appointment at Harvard, Hall has held visiting professorships and fellowships at institutions including the London School of Economics, Princeton University, the Wissenschaftszentrum Berlin, Center for Advanced Study in the Behavioral Sciences and the Russell Sage Foundation.

== Research and contributions ==
Hall’s research focuses on comparative political economy, institutional change, democratic governance, and the relationship between capitalism and social inequality. He is a leading figure in historical institutionalism and is widely cited for his work on policy paradigms, social learning, and institutional complementarities.

His co-edited book Varieties of Capitalism: The Institutional Foundations of Comparative Advantage (2001), written with David Soskice, introduced a framework distinguishing between liberal and coordinated market economies and has become a foundational text in political economy and economic sociology. His earlier book The Political Power of Economic Ideas (1989) examined the diffusion of Keynesianism across advanced democracies and contributed to scholarship on ideas and policy change.

== Selected awards and honors ==
- 1987 – Woodrow Wilson Foundation Award, American Political Science Association
- 1999 – Gregory Luebbert Award, American Political Science Association
- 2002 – Alpha Iota Prize for Excellence in Teaching, Phi Beta Kappa, Harvard University
- 2003 – Chevalier of the Ordre des Palmes Académiques of the French Republic
- 2006 – Doctorate Honoris Causa, Sciences Po
- 2009 – Aaron Wildavsky Award from the Policy Studies Organization for a book of enduring influence in public policy
- 2017 – Elected Corresponding Fellow of the British Academy
- 2018 – Guggenheim Fellowship
- 2018 – Fellow of the Royal Society of Arts
- 2019 – Elected Fellow of the American Academy of Arts and Sciences
- 2024 – Bingham Powell Award for Graduate Mentoring, APSA Comparative Politics Section
- 2025 – Named John Fayerweather Eminent Scholar by the Academy of International Business

== Selected works ==
- Governing the Economy: The Politics of State Intervention in Britain and France. New York: Oxford University Press, 1986.
- European Labor in the 1980s. New York: M. E. Sharpe, 1987. (Edited volume; special issue of the International Journal of Political Economy, Vol. 17, No. 3.)
- The Political Power of Economic Ideas: Keynesianism across Nations. Princeton, New Jersey: Princeton University Press, 1989.
- Developments in French Politics. London: Macmillan, 1990. Edited with Jack Hayward and Howard Machin. (Second edition, 1994; French translation published as L’évolution de la vie politique française, Paris: Presses Universitaires de France, 1992.)
- Public Policy-Making in Spain. New York: M. E. Sharpe, 1990. Edited with Víctor Pérez-Díaz. (Special issue of the International Journal of Political Economy, Vol. 20, No. 3.)
- Varieties of Capitalism: The Institutional Foundations of Comparative Advantage. Oxford: Oxford University Press, 2001. Edited with David Soskice.
- Developments in French Politics 2. London: Palgrave Macmillan, 2001. Edited with Alain Guyomarch, Jack Hayward, and Howard Machin.
- Changing France: The Politics that Markets Make. London: Palgrave Macmillan, 2006. Edited with Pepper Culpepper and Bruno Palier.
- Successful Societies: How Institutions and Culture Affect Health. New York: Cambridge University Press, 2009. Edited with Michèle Lamont.
- Social Resilience in the Neoliberal Era. New York: Cambridge University Press, 2013. Edited with Michèle Lamont.
- The Politics of Representation in the Global Age: Identification, Mobilization and Adjudication. New York: Cambridge University Press, 2014. Edited with Wade Jacoby, Jonah Levy, and Sophie Meunier.
- Political Change and Electoral Coalitions in Western Democracies. New York: Cambridge University Press, 2023. With Georgina Evans and Sung In Kim.
- Governing Growth: The Postwar Transformation of Capitalism and Democracy. Princeton, New Jersey: Princeton University Press, forthcoming 2026.
