= Lessie B. Branch =

American scholar

- Born: Hempstead, New York, U.S.
- Education: Fordham University (BA), The New School (MA, MPhil, PhD)
- Known for: Racial policy scholar, author, and advocate
- Notable work: Optimism at All Costs: Black Attitudes, Activism, and Advancement in Obama's America

Lessie B. Branch is an American scholar specializing in public and urban policy, with a focus on equity and social justice. She is a U.S. Navy veteran and currently serves as the Special Assistant for Community Engagement at the New York State Department of Veterans' Services. Previously, Branch held the position of Associate Dean and Associate Professor in the School of Business at Metropolitan College of New York. In 2019, she became the first Woman of color elected as the Region 1 Chair for the Accreditation Council for Business Schools and Programs (ACBSP).

== Education ==
Lessie Branch earned her Bachelor of Arts degree in political science from Fordham University in 1990. She completed her Master of Arts in politics at The New School for Social Research in 2017, followed by an MPhil and PhD in public and urban policy from the School of Public Engagement at the New School in 2011 and 2015. Her doctoral dissertation, titled "Paradoxical Ebullience: Discordance Between Changing Black Racial Attitudes and Stagnation of Black Economic Progress," was later revised and published as her first book, Optimism At All Costs: Black Attitudes, Activism, and Advancement in Obama's America (2018).

== Career ==
Lessie Branch served as a faculty member at Monroe College from 2004 to 2018. She held the position of associate dean and associate professor in the School for Business at Metropolitan College of New York from 2018 to 2021. Additionally, she was the lead adjunct professor in the executive leadership doctoral program at Saint John Fisher University from 2020 to 2024. Branch was elected chair of the Accreditation Council for Business Schools and Programs for the Northeast from 2019 to 2021. Branch is the author of Optimism at All Costs: Black Attitudes, Activism, and Advancement in Obama's America and a contributing author to Reimagining Historically Black Colleges and Universities: Survival Beyond 2020. Her writings have been published in various outlets, including Blavity, Diverse Education, Gotham Gazette, The Bronx Times, and Scholars Strategy Network. In her 2016 TEDxTalk, she addresses socio-economic inequality and critiques post-racial neoliberal narratives that suggest race is no longer connected to socioeconomic outcome and life chances.

Lessie Branch examines the contrast between the economic realities faced by Black Americans and the optimism many express for the future, using survey data and the rhetoric of prominent Black figures, including President Obama. She argues that this disparity has led to a resistance to social activism. Branch views the emergence of the Black Lives Matter movement as a significant development in this context. Her work aims to contribute to ongoing discussions about race and progress in various settings, including educational institutions, media, and legislative bodies.
