= Sven Steinmo =

American political scientist (1953–2024)

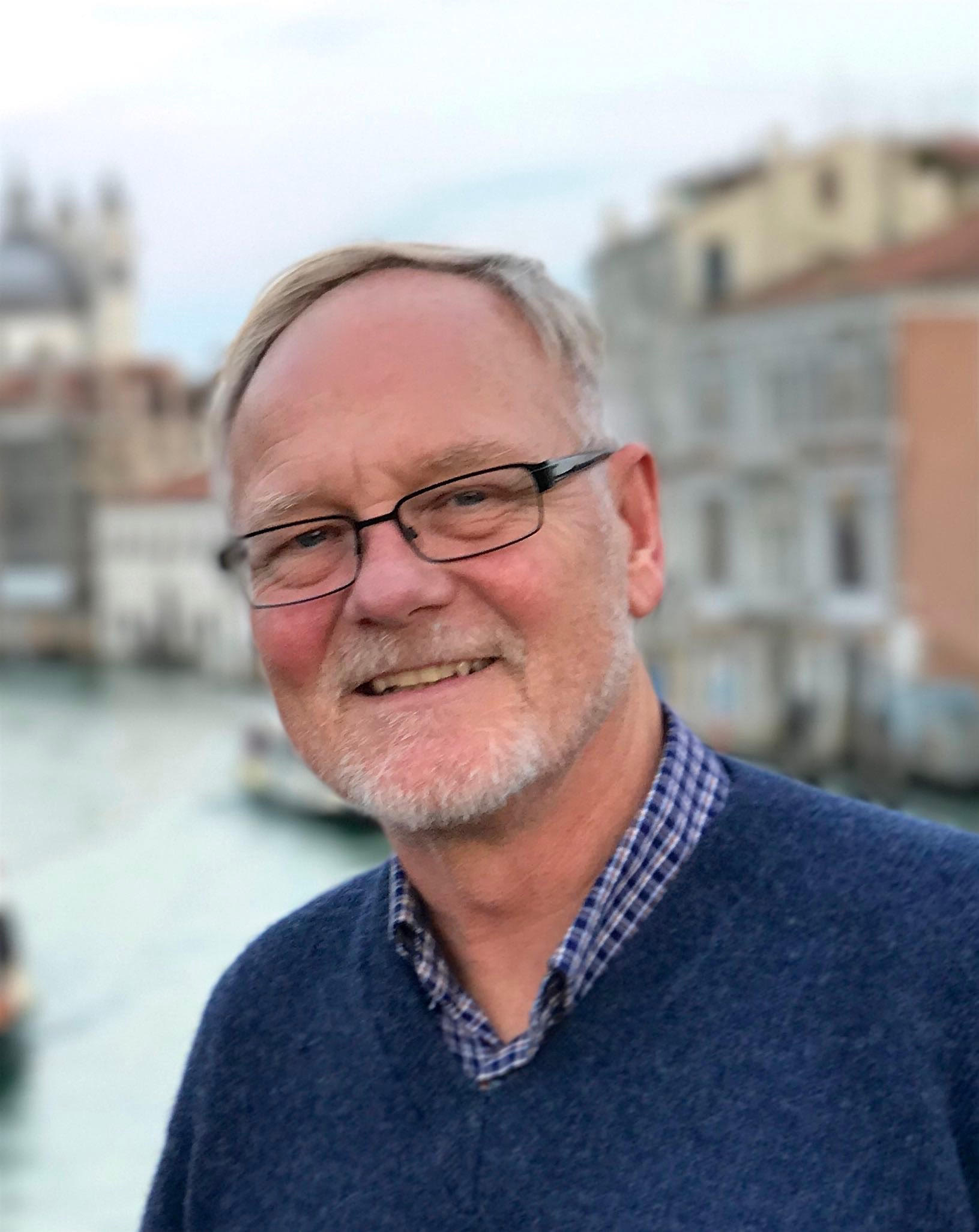

Sven Holger Steinmo (August 24, 1953 – July 9, 2024) was an American political scientist. He worked at the University of Colorado, Boulder as professor of political science. He obtained his BA from the University of California, Santa Cruz, and his MA, MPH, and PhD from the University of California, Berkeley. His primary teaching and research interests were in the realm of institutional theory, comparative public policy, and comparative historical analysis. Steinmo also researched how political and economic institutions grew and currently operate within various developed democracies, such as Sweden and Japan, while utilizing the perspectives found in evolutionary theory. He was widely recognized for his work in institutional theory, having been one of the founders of the subfield of historical institutionalism. His book with Kathleen Thelen, Structuring Politics: Historical Institutionalism and Comparative Analysis (1992), is academically notable, and is a significant contribution within that domain of research.

Steinmo held a position as "Research Professor" at the Robert Schuman Center for Advanced Studies (RSCAS) of the European University Institute (EUI) in Florence. While being hosted by the EUI, Steinmo was awarded the prestigious Frontier Grant (2.5 million Euro), also referred to as the European MacArthur Fellowship, by the European Research Council in September 2012. After receiving the award, Steinmo acted as the Principal Investigator in his European Commission funded project, "Willing to Pay?". The goal of the project was to better understand, through experiment, why heterogeneity exists among different democratic welfare states regarding citizens' willingness to pay government taxes. In broad terms, "Willing to Pay?" set out to explore "the interactive relationships between policy choices, institutions and ideas", effectively "exploring and explaining the multiple paths and different choices made in different democratic welfare states". Steinmo returned to a professorship position at the University of Colorado, Boulder in 2017. His most recent project, Leap of Faith (2018), explores the relationship between citizens and their government regarding general trust and tax compliance.

Steinmo died on July 9, 2024, at the age of 70.

== Selected books ==
- Willing to Pay? A Reasonable Choice Approach (with John D’Attoma) Oxford University Press, (2022).
- Leap of Faith Oxford University Press (2018)
- The Evolution of Modern States: Sweden, Japan, and the United States Cambridge University Press, (2010)
- Growing Apart? America and Europe in the 21st Century Cambridge University Press, (2007)
- Restructuring the Welfare State: Political Institutions and Policy Change (2002, co-edited with Bo Rothstein)
- Taxation and Democracy: Swedish, British and American Approaches to Financing the Modern State (1996)
- Structuring Politics: Historical Institutionalism in Comparative Analysis (1992)
