= Pang Chien-kuo =

Taiwanese politician (1953–2022)

- 龐建國
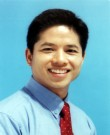
- Pang Chien-kuo during the 2000s

Member of the Legislative Yuan
- In office 1 February 2002 – 31 January 2005
- Constituency: Taipei City Constituency II

Member of the Taipei City Council
- In office 25 December 1992 – 31 January 2002

Personal details
- Born: 19 August 1953 Miaoli County, Taiwan
- Died: 11 January 2022 (aged 68) Neihu District, Taiwan
- Party: NP (1994–1998); Independent (1998–2000); PFP (2001–2006); Kuomintang (2006–2022)
- Education: National Chung Hsing University (BS); National Taiwan University (MA); Brown University (MA, PhD)
- Scientific career
- Fields: Sociology
- Thesis: The state and economic transformation: The Taiwan case (1988)
- Doctoral advisor: Peter B. Evans

Chinese name
- Traditional Chinese: 龐建國
- Simplified Chinese: 庞建国
Transcriptions
Standard Mandarin
- Hanyu Pinyin: Páng Jiànguó
- Bopomofo: ㄆㄤˊ ㄐㄧㄢˋ ㄍㄨㄛˊ
- Wade–Giles: Pʻang^{2} Chien^{4}-kuo^{2}
Yue: Cantonese
- Jyutping: Pong^{4} Gin^{3}-gwok^{3}

Pang Chien-kuo (Chinese: 龐建國; 19 August 1953 – 11 January 2022) was a Taiwanese sociologist and politician. He was known for his efforts for promoting Chinese unification.

== Early life and education ==
Pang was born in Miaoli County on August 19, 1953. He was of Cantonese descent, and his ancestral home was in Yangjiang, Guangdong. Pang's grandfather was a member of Sun Yat-sen's Tongmenghui revolutionary group and participated in the 1911 Second Guangzhou Uprising, and his father was a graduate of Whampoa Military Academy and participated in the Northern Expedition and the Second Sino-Japanese War. Because of his family background, Pang was a strong believer in the Three Principles of the People.

Pang studied applied mathematics at National Chung Hsing University and graduated with a Bachelor of Science (B.S.) in 1975. After completing a master's degree in law from National Taiwan University in 1980, he pursued graduate studies in the United States, where he earned a Master of Arts (M.A.) in 1984 and his Ph.D. in 1988, both in sociology and urban studies from Brown University. His doctoral dissertation, completed under sociologist Peter B. Evans, was titled, "The State and Economic Transformation: The Taiwan Case".

== Career ==
After receiving his doctorate, Pang was an associate researcher at Academia Sinica's Institute of Ethnology. A member of the New Party, the People First Party, and later Kuomintang, he served in the Taipei City Council from 1992 to 2002 and in the Legislative Yuan from 2002 to 2005. He contested the 2004 legislative election as a PFP candidate, and did not win. In 2004, Pang spoke for the family of Lien Chan regarding a decision on legal action against Next Magazine. During that year's presidential election, Pang was spokesman for the Kuomintang and People First Party's fusion ticket.

After stepping down from the legislature, Pang served as an adviser to the Straits Exchange Foundation, subsequently accepting a professorship at Chinese Culture University, within the Graduate Institute of National Development and Mainland China. Pang was later appointed director-general of the Taiwan Competitiveness Forum.

== Personal life and death ==
Pang married news anchor Chiu Hsiu-chen in 2001. He died from a fall from his home in Neihu District on 11 January 2022 at 7am, at the age of 68. A few hours before his death, Pang left a message three times in his LINE group and the same message in his WeChat groups, saying "I would rather die than live in this unjust Taiwan!" Worried about the hardships of the people and the future of Taiwan, he had been deeply saddened by the huge defeats of the KMT in the referendum a month earlier and in the recall election of Freddy Lim and legislator by-election two days earlier, and had been distraught by the on-going de-Sinicization pushed forward by the ruling DPP. Prior to his death, Pang had been diagnosed with cancer.
