= States and Social Revolutions =

1979 book by Theda Skocpol

- Author: Theda Skocpol
- Published: 1979
- Pages: 407 pp.
- ISBN: 978-0-521-29499-7
- OCLC: 432787244

States and Social Revolutions: A Comparative Analysis of France, Russia and China is a 1979 book by Theda Skocpol, published by Cambridge University Press, that examines the causes of social revolutions.

In the book, Skocpol performs a comparative historical analysis of the French Revolution of 1789 through the early 19th century, the Russian Revolution of 1917 through the 1930s and the 1911 Revolution through the Cultural Revolution in the 1960s. Skocpol argues that social revolutions occurred in these states because of the simultaneous occurrence of state breakdown and peasant revolution.

Skocpol asserts that social revolutions are rapid and basic transformations of a society's state and class structures. She distinguishes this from mere rebellions, which involve a revolt of subordinate classes but may not create structural change, and from political revolutions that may change state structures but not social structures. What is unique about social revolutions, she argues, is that basic changes in social structure and political structure occur in a mutually reinforcing fashion and these changes occur through intense socio-political conflict. A convergence of peasant rebellion on one hand and international pressures causing state breakdown on the other hand cause revolutionary social movements.

The book was highly influential in the study of revolutions, and has been credited with ushering in a new paradigm.

== History ==
The book was written in 1978 and is derived from Skocpol's PhD dissertation which was supervised by George Homans, Daniel Bell, and Seymour Martin Lipset. She had been influenced by works by Barrington Moore, Jr, Reinhard Bendix and Samuel P. Huntington. Her project started as a graduate seminar paper comparing revolutions, read by Daniel Bell who suggested she should do her thesis on this topic.

== Synopsis ==
The book uses both John Stuart Mill's methods of agreement and difference in the case selection. The book is not intended to be generalizable: it only applies to the specific cases that are studied in the book. The book employs process-tracing. While the primary focus is on France, Russia and China, she also examines "moments of revolutionary crisis" in 17th century England, 19th century Prussia and 19th century Japan. Those additional cases prevent Skocpol from "selecting on the dependent variable" – looking only at cases where revolutions occurred as a way to understand the causes of revolution – which would have been a methodological flaw. The additional cases serve as "controls".

Before social revolutions can occur, she says, the administrative and military power of a state has to break down. Thus pre-revolutionary France, Russia and China had well-established states that stood astride large agrarian economies in which the imperial state and the landed upper classes partnered in the control and exploitation of the peasantry. However, the monarchy in each country faced an extraordinary dilemma in dealing with foreign power intrusion on the one hand and resistance to raising resources by politically powerful dominant domestic classes on the other. A revolution such as the French revolution also presented itself with a significant factor of power conducted with social, political, and economical conflicts. She describes the processes by which the centralized administrative and military machinery disintegrated in these countries, which made class relations vulnerable to assaults from below.

== Reception ==
Criticism of Skocpol's book centers around her deemphasis of agency (role of individuals and ideology) and her mixed use of comparative methodological strategies. Ira Katznelson disputes that Skocpol's use of J.S. Mill's method of difference allows her to overcome the problems associated with many potential variables.

According to Peter Manicas, Skocpol denies claims by historians that social revolutions should be analyzed as separate and distinct movements. She also denies claims that try to over generalize what makes a revolution. Peter Manicas says that Skocpol's work is successful at creating a theory that uses generalizations but is sensitive to differences between states and situations.

According to Steve Pfaff, Skocpol's book created "a distinctive genre of neo-Weberian state-society analysis and, more broadly, served as signature work in the new historical and comparative subfields in sociology and comparative politics." He says that Skocpol presents revolutionary urban middle class in each of the states she studies as "political entrepreneurs" because they take on the reins of the revolution after the peasant class has successfully weakened the ruling government. Skocpol's book, according to Pfaff, is a clearly identifiable as a product of the politics of the 1970s. She "helped launch a new generation of comparative research on the largest and most consequential of historical questions." Pfaff goes on to say, even if Skocpol didn't explain the causes that might have triggered state crisis and the mobilization of the people, "and if, in its enthusiasm for revolution, it overestimated the gains of revolutionary transformation, the book nevertheless deserves its place among the canonical works of comparative and historical research."

Jeff Goodwin argues, in his own analysis, that Skocpol's fame comes in large part, not from a substantial number of people reading her book, but from a small number of "designated readers" critiquing her book and spreading what they believe to be her main ideas. Goodwin says, "A good part of Skocpol's fame is due to the wide diffusion of several misformulations of some key ideas." Goodwin explains three major "misformulations" scholars have made about "States and Social Revolutions".

- The first misinterpretation of Skocpol's book says she makes the point that a revolution or a rebellions success depends solely on state institutions. According to Goodwin, however, Skocpol's argument is more complex: it states that the French, Russian and Chinese revolutions are a result of state institutions becoming more susceptible to collapse due to outside influence as well as peasant rebellion.
- A second misperception of this book claims that Skocpol downplays the relevance of ideology in a revolution, an argument made by Pfaff, as mentioned earlier. What Skocpol means to argue, Goodwin says, is that no singular group consciously brought on the revolution.
- A third and final argument people have claimed Skocpol to make in "States and Social Revolutions" is that a general theory on revolutions can be made simply through the comparison of a select group of revolutions. Goodwin, like Richards, says Skocpol's book does not try to create an overarching theory of revolution by using the three examples of revolutions. To the contrary, "she explicitly warns that her conjunctural explanation for social revolutions in this particular context cannot be mechanically extended to others."

Although published over thirty years ago, Theda Skocpol's book continues to influence historians and sociologists alike today. Skocpol presented a new way to look at social revolutions and analyze then through a structural and state centered perspective. Although her analysis may not be complete in the eyes of many, it offers a new perspective and fills in the holes in many theories before hers as well as the theories of her educators, including Barrington Moore Jr.

In Barbara Geddes's Paradigms and Sand Castles: Theory Building and Research Design in Comparative Politics, she writes that Skocpol's use of contrasting cases (cases where revolutions did happen and did not happen) makes her claims regarding the importance of class structures and alliances in determining revolution outcomes persuasive. But she writes that Skocpol's claim that all revolutionary outbreaks occur as a result of international crises is not well-supported. For example, Geddes notes that a revolution occurred in France but France was not at the time more threatened by external events than many of its neighbors. Geddes also argues that Skocpol's choice of cases (and exclusion of other cases) is not particularly well-supported. When Geddes expanded the number of cases to include nine Latin-American countries (which Geddes argued were within the scope conditions of the theory), Skocpol's theory of social revolution failed replication. Geddes argues that Skocpol includes a number of cases for reasons that are ill-justified.

James Mahoney and Gary Goertz found no evidence that Skocpol exclusively picked negative cases to intentionally lend support for her theory. They also argue that the new cases added by Geddes are not within the scope conditions of Skocpol's theory. In their own analysis, Mahoney and Goertz added new cases that were within the scope conditions of Skocpol's theory, ultimately finding that her theory was consistent with an expanded set of cases.

Lewis A. Coser, president of the American Sociological Association, wrote in The New York Times Book Review, "I am convinced that States and Social Revolutions will be considered a landmark in the study of the sources of revolution."

Cambridge University Press includes States and Social Revolutions in its "Canto Classics" series and the book remains in print as of 2016.
