= Linkage institution =

Institution connecting people to government or authority

A linkage institution is a structure within a society that connects the people to the government or centralized authority. These institutions include: elections, political parties, interest groups, and the media. Popular examples of linkage institutions include the NRA, AARP, NAACP, and BBC.

== Development ==
Government is established as a legitimate alternative to violence. These governments create policymaking institutions to develop rules by which conflicts within society are to be resolved. Democratic governments often elect a legislative body, monarchies rely on a single arbitrator, and aristocracies establish a privileged body of individuals. All of these centralize authority, develop an institutionalized structure, and provide a means for creating policy. Dynamic social changes occasionally require rules within a society to adapt. Linkage institutions serve to connect individuals within a society to the centralized authority.

Political exclusions and oligarchical tendencies within societies may result in "linkage failures." These failures create tensions within society and act as catalysts for social protests and rebellion.

== See also ==
- Institution
