= List of Sciences Po honorary doctorate recipients =

Political Studies institute in Paris

The Paris Institute of Political Studies, commonly known as Sciences Po, awards honorary doctorates to individuals of foreign nationality who make outstanding contributions to academia and politics in the humanities and social sciences, notably in the fields of economics, history, law, political science, sociology. Created in 1918, the title of Doctor honoris causa is one of the most prestigious distinctions awarded by French higher education institutions to honour people of foreign nationalities because of outstanding services to science, literature or the arts, to France or to the higher education institution that awards the title.

== Nomination ==
Since 1974, the French Government has authorised Sciences Po to award the title of doctor honoris causa.

The decree specifies that the title of doctor honoris causa is bestowed by the President of Sciences Po to individuals of foreign nationality in instances where outstanding contributions have been made to the arts, to literature, to science and technology, in France or to Sciences Po.

This distinction may be attributed in consultation with the French Ministry for Europe and Foreign Affairs, upon proposals submitted by the university. The degree is established and signed by the president of the university.

== Laureates ==
Between 1989 and 2023, Sciences Po has awarded the distinction of doctor honoris causa to twenty-eight prominent figures in the academic and political worlds. In accordance with French Government guidelines, all recipients are of foreign nationality. The decision to award this distinction is rare and constitutes a great recognition for the contributions of the individual. The large number of recipients in 2006 (six laureates) is due to the celebration of the sixtieth anniversary of the National Foundation of Political Science.

Year	Laureate (birth/death)	Country	Notes
1989	Henry Ehrmann (1908-1994)	United States	Author and professor of law and political science at Dartmouth College. This award also recognises the individual's role in the escape of many European intellectuals from Vichy France during the Second World War.
1989	Albert Hirschman (1915-2012)	United States	Economist at Princeton University and author. This award also recognises the individual's role in the escape of many European intellectuals from Vichy France during the Second World War.
1989	Sergio Romano (b. 1929)	Italy	Diplomat, writer, journalist, and historian. Former Ambassador of Italy to Russia.
1993	Boutros Boutros-Ghali (1922-2016)	Egypt	Politician and diplomat who served as Secretary-General of the United Nations from 1992 to 1996 and the first Secretary-General of La Francophonie from 1997 to 2002.
1993	Karl Dietrich Bracher (1922-2016)	Germany	Political scientist and historian of the Weimar Republic and Nazi Germany.
1993	Alexandre Lamfalussy (1929-2015)	Belgium	Economist at the Bank for International Settlements and the European Monetary Institute.
1993	Theodore Lowi (1931-2017)	United States	Political scientist and John L. Senior Professor of Political Institutions at Cornell University.
1993	Charles Tilly (1929-2008)	United States	Sociologist, political scientist, and historian who was Joseph L. Buttenwieser Professor of Social Science at Columbia University.
2006	Robert Keohane (b. 1941)	United States	Professor Emeritus of International Affairs at the Princeton School of Public and International Affairs.
2006	Peter A. Hall (b. 1950)	Canada	American author and professor of history at Harvard University.
2006	Mario Monti (b. 1943)	Italy	Economist, European Commissioner from 1995 to 2004, and Prime Minister of Italy from 2011 to 2013. Since 1994, he has been president of Bocconi University.
2006	Mark Granovetter (b. 1943)	United States	Sociologist and professor at Stanford University.
2006	Horst Möller (b. 1943)	Germany	Professor of Modern History at LMU Munich and Director of the Institut für Zeitgeschichte from 1992 to 2011.
2006	Edmund Phelps (b. 1933)	United States	Economist and recipient of the 2006 Nobel Memorial Prize in Economic Sciences.
2009	Václav Havel (1936-2011)	Czech Republic	Statesman, playwright, and political dissident, who served as the last president of Czechoslovakia from 1989 until the dissolution of Czechoslovakia in 1992 and then as the first president of the Czech Republic from 1993 to 2003. He was awarded a doctorate for his role in the promotion of democracy after the fall of communism.
2011	Duncan Kennedy (b. 1942)	United States	Legal philosopher and former Carter Professor of General Jurisprudence at Harvard Law School.
2011	Luiz Inácio Lula da Silva (b. 1945)	Brazil	Politician and trade union leader who served as the president of Brazil from 2003 to 2010. The award of this honorary doctorate was considered a major event in relations between Brazil and European countries due to the controversial image of Lula in his home country.
2011	Helen Wallace (b. 1946)	United Kingdom	Specialist in European Affairs at the London School of Economics. She is the first woman to receive the honour.
2014	Arnaldo Bagnasco (1936-2012)	Italy	Sociologist and member of the Accademia dei Lincei.
2014	Jacques Drèze (b. 1929)	Belgium	Economist at the Université catholique de Louvain.
2016	Lakhdar Brahimi (b. 1934)	Algeria	United Nations diplomat, Arab League Special Envoy to Syria from 2012 to 2014, and Algerian Minister of Foreign Affairs from 1991 to 1993.
2017	Daphne Barak-Erez (b. 1965)	Israel	Professor at the Law Faculty of Tel-Aviv University and member of the Supreme Court of Israel.
2017	Jane Mansbridge (b. 1939)	United States	Political scientist and Charles F. Adams Professor of Political Leadership and Democratic Values at Harvard Kennedy School.
2017	Ibrahima Thioub (b. 1955)	Senegal	Professor of history and rector at Cheikh Anta Diop University in Dakar.
2019	Joseph Stiglitz (b. 1943)	United States	Economist, public policy analyst, and professor at Columbia University. He is the recipient of the 2001 Nobel Memorial Prize in Economic Sciences. The doctorate was awarded for Stiglitz's role "as the figure of the new Keynesian economy".
2019	Viviana Zelizer (b. 1946)	United States	Professor of sociology at Princeton University. The doctorate was awarded in order to recognise "her work as the founder of a new school of economic sociology".
2022	Elena Zhemkova		
2023	Angela Merkel		

== See also ==
- Sciences Po
- Education in France
