= Rational choice institutionalism =

Social science theory

Rational choice institutionalism (RCI) is a theoretical approach to the study of institutions arguing that actors use institutions to maximize their utility, and that institutions affect rational individual behavior. Rational choice institutionalism arose initially from the study of congressional behaviour in the U.S. in the late 1970s. Influential early RCI scholarship was done by political economists at California Institute of Technology, University of Rochester, and Washington University in St. Louis. It employs analytical tools borrowed from neo-classical economics to explain how institutions are created, the behaviour of political actors within it, and the outcome of strategic interaction.

RCI explains the creation of institutions as an attempt to reduce transaction costs of collective activity which would be significantly higher without such institutions. Institutions persist after their creation because they reduce uncertainty and allow gains from exchange. Rational choice institutionalism assumes that political actors within the institutional setting have a fixed set of preferences. To maximize those preferences actors behave highly instrumental through systematic foresight and strategic cost-benefit calculation. Institutions lay down the 'rules of the game', define the range of available strategies and the sequence of alternatives. The actors' behaviour will be highly influenced by the expectation how other players will bargain. The institutional environment provides information and enforcement mechanism that reduce uncertainty for each actor about the corresponding behaviour of others. This 'calculus approach' explains how the institutional setting influences individual behaviour and stresses how strategic interaction determines policy outcomes.

Erik Voeten writes that the strength of RCI approaches to institutions is that they allow "us to think about what institutions should look like if they were designed to optimally improve cooperation. This provides a normative benchmark." He argues that alternative perspectives cannot compete with RCI in terms of "its range of testable and generalizable implications."

== Definition of institutions ==
RCI scholars tend to define institutions as "rules of the game". These rules structure the incentives of actors, and thus alters their behavior. One prominent RCI definition of institutions is provided by Jack Knight who defines institutions as:

sets of rules that structure social interactions in particular ways. These rules (1) provide information about how people are expected to act in particular situations, (2) can be recognized by those who are members of the relevant group as the rules to which others conform in these situations, and (3) structure the strategic choices of actors in such a way as to produce equilibrium outcomes.

According to Erik Voeten, rational choice scholarship on international institutions can be divided between (1) rational functionalism and (2) Distributive rationalism. The former sees organizations as functional optimal solutions to collective problems, whereas the latter sees organizations as an outcome of actors' individual and collective goals. Since individual and collective goals may conflict, the latter version of RCI accepts that suboptimal institutions are likely.

== Explanations for suboptimal institutions ==
=== Principal-agent model ===
A key concept of Rational Choice Institutionalism is the principal-agent model borrowed from Neo-classical economics. This model is used to explain why some institutions appear to be inefficient, suboptimal, dysfunctional or generally go against the intentions of the actors who created the institution. The concept assumes that the principal enters into a contractual relation with a second party, the agent, and delegates responsibility to the latter to fulfil certain responsibilities or a set of tasks on behalf of the principal. Problems occur due to an asymmetric distribution of information which favours the agent. The latter enables the agent to pursue its own interest and engage in opportunistic behaviour – shirking - at the cost of the principal's interest. The principal's problem is how to control and limit shirking by the agent.

=== Domestic politics ===
RCI scholars may also argue that international institutional dysfunction may stem from domestic politics, as governments use these institutions both to solve problems between states but also to achieve domestic political outcomes.

== Limitations ==
Rational Choice Institutionalism is frequently contrasted with Historical Institutionalism and Sociological Institutionalism. Historical Institutionalism emphasizes how small events and accidents may create paths from which it is hard to turn back from. Examining the actors involved in creating an institution and the contexts that they were operating in may provide better explanations for why particular institutions were created. Critical junctures – which can be small events and accidents – may lead to institutional change or set institutions on paths from which it is hard to turn back from. This is in contrast to Rational Choice Institutionalism where the creation of institutions, as well as institutional change, reflects optimal and efficient outcomes for actors. Historical institutionalists would rebut that by noting that many institutions are inefficient, and that these inefficiencies can be better explained through path dependency.

Both sociological institutionalism and historical institutionalism would argue against the suggestion that we can assume that actors have exogenous preferences (the notion that we can assume the preferences of actors). They would argue actors do not have stable and consistent preferences, and that scholars cannot assume that they hold a given set of preferences. As a consequence, these other approaches argue that it is unreasonable to assume that a Pareto-optimal equilibrium solution exists to collective action problems.

William H. Riker, a political scientist prominent for his application of game theory and mathematics in political science, argued that a key problem with RCI scholarship was the so-called "inherability problem", which referred to an inability to distinguish whether outcomes resulted from institutions or from the preferences of actors, which made it impossible to predict optimal outcomes.

Terry Moe argues that RCI neglects to consider the ways in which political institutions differ from other institutions, and that RCI neglects the role of power in shaping outcomes. In other words, Moe argues that RCI accounts of political institutions as structures of voluntary cooperation, mutual gains and solutions to collective action problems are unrealistic. Historical institutionalists make a similar critique as they argue that politics is shaped by policy feedbacks and path dependencies which mean that past policies cement or increase power asymmetries, which shapes the kinds of outcomes that are possible in the future.

In the context of Latin American politics, Kurt Weyland has argued that Rational Choice Institutionalism is overly focused on politics as it is conducted in legislative institutions and elections, as well as the formal rules and formal institutions of politics. He also argues that it insufficiently accounts for political change and crises, and overly focuses on microfoundations.

In an influential article (and later book), George Washington University political scientists Michael Barnett and Martha Finnemore argue rationalist accounts of institutions (such as those emphasizing principal-agent problems) cannot fully account for institutional pathologies. They provide a sociological institutionalist account of institutional dysfunction whereby institutions have powers derived from their rational-legal authority, and that these powers and autonomy may give rise to suboptimal outcomes.

Alexander Wendt has argued that rationalist accounts of institutional design often lack falsifiability: it is not clear how one would demonstrate that an institution was not rationally designed.

Alexander Wendt and Paul Pierson have also argued if actors are guided by a logic of appropriateness, rather than a logic of consequence, then the institutions that they design are not truly optimal. Both of them question that the actors that create institutions are capable of designing functional institutions (institutions that achieve the founders' goals).

James March and Herbert Simon criticize rational approaches to institutions, arguing that it is problematic to assume that actors have ordered preferences, actors understand the alternative choices available to them, and that actors pursue optimal alternatives (rather than satisficing alternatives). They argue that actors rely on routinized responses to problems that emerge, as opposed to evaluating and deliberating on the optimal response. This can be seen during episodes of uncertainty when actors respond in routinized ways, rather than craft original solutions to the newly emergent problems.

Hendrik Spruyt argues that the "pure rational choice variant of methodological individualism" (such as functionalist RCI approaches) is flawed because "we cannot simply deduce institutional outcomes from preferences or impute preferences from observed outcomes."

== See also ==
- Rational choice theory
- New institutionalism
- Neoliberalism
- Historical Institutionalism
