= Ben Ross Schneider =

American political scientist

Academic background
- Education: University of California, Berkeley; Columbia University; Williams College

Academic work
- Discipline: Political Science
- Sub-discipline: comparative politics, political economy, and Latin American politics
- Institutions: Massachusetts Institute of Technology
- Website: http://brs.mit.edu/

Ben Ross Schneider is an American political scientist and professor. He is currently the Ford International Professor of Political Science and director of the MIT Chile Program at Massachusetts Institute of Technology.

Schneider is married to Kathleen Thelen, who is also a political scientist at MIT.
