= Peter B. Evans =

American academic

- Born: 1944 (age 81–82)

Academic background
- Education: Harvard University (BA, MA, PhD); University of Oxford (MA)

Academic work
- Institutions: University of California, Berkeley; Watson Institute for International and Public Affairs at Brown University
- Doctoral students: Pang Chien-kuo

Peter Evans (born 1944) is an American political sociologist who is Faculty Fellow in International and Public Affairs at the Watson Institute for International and Public Affairs at Brown University and Professor of Sociology emeritus at the University of California, Berkeley.

His work focuses on the comparative political economy of development and globalization. He has published widely on state-society relations, industrial economic development in Brazil and Latin America, civil society, and international development issues. In 1985, Evans edited the influential collection, Bringing the State Back In, along with Theda Skocpol and Dietrich Rueschemeyer. The volume sought to highlight the important role of the state in explaining political and economic outcomes.

== Biography ==
Evans studied sociology as an undergraduate at Harvard University. As a 20-year-old, Evans taught sociology at Kivukoni College in Dar es Salaam, Tanzania. After teaching in Tanzania, Evans completed his undergraduate sociology thesis at Harvard and received his BA magna cum laude. He has an MA from Oxford University, and an MA and PhD from Harvard.

Evans is active in the American Sociological Association's section on Labor and Labor Movements and has served as chair of that section. He is also a board member of the United Nations Research Institute for Social Development. Evans has taught at Oxford University, Brown University, the University of New Mexico, and Universidade de Brasília. In recent years, he has focused his attention on the study of alternative, and counterhegemonic globalization movements.

In the year 2000 Evans co-founded The Other Canon, a center and network for heterodox economics research, with - amongst others - Erik Reinert, executive chairman and main founder.

== Selected publications ==
- Population, Health and Development: An Institutional-Cultural Approiach to Capability Expansion. In Peter B. Halland Michele Lamont (eds.) Successful Societies: How Institutions and Culture Affect Health Cambridge University Press, 2009.
- Is an Alternative Globalization Possible? Politics & Society, 2008, 36(2)
- The Challenges of the 'Institutional Turn': Interdisciplinary Opportunities in Development Theory. In Victor Nee and Richard Swedberg (eds.) The Economic Sociology of Capitalist Institutions Princeton, NJ: Princeton University Press, 2005.
- Building ridges across a double divide: Alliances between U.S. and Latin American labor and NGOs (with M. Anner), Development in Practice, 2004, 14(1-2), 34–47.
- Collective capabilities, culture and Amartya Sen's development of freedom, Studies in Comparative International Development, 2002, 37(2), 54–60.
- Dependent Development: The Alliance of Multinational, State, and Local Capital in Brazil (1979) Translated into Portuguese, 1980.
- Embedded Autonomy: States and industrial Transformation (1995)
- Counterhegemonic Globalization: Transnational Social Movements in the Contemporary Global Political Economy. In Handbook of Political Sociology (2005)
- Bringing the State Back In, edited with Dietrich Rueschemeyer and Theda Skocpol. (1985)
- States Versus Markets in the World-System, edited with Dietrich Rueschemeyer and Evelyne Huber Stephens. (1985)
- High Technology and Third World Industrialization: Brazilian Computer Policy in Comparative Perspective, edited with Claudio R. Frischtak and Paulo Bastos Tigre. (1992)
- Double-Edged Diplomacy: International Bargaining and Domestic Politics, edited with Harold K. Jacobson and Robert Putnam. (1993)
- Sunbelt Working Mothers: Reconciling Family and Factory by Louise Lamphere, Patricia Zavella, Felipe Gonzales; with Peter B. Evans. (1993)
- State-Society Synergy: Government and Social Capital in Development (1997)
- Livable Cities?: Urban Struggles for Livelihood and Sustainability (2002)
