= Social Contract (disambiguation) =

Social contract is a broad class of theories that try to explain the ways in which people form states and/or maintain social order.

Social Contract may also refer to:

== Policies ==
- Social Contract (Britain), a policy of the British Labour party in the 1970s
- Social contract (Malaysia), an agreement concerning citizenship rights
- Social Contract (Ontario), a 1993 wage restraint initiative in Ontario

== Books ==
- The Social Contract, a book Jean-Jacques Rousseau published in 1762
- The Social Contract (1970 book), a paleoanthropology book by Robert Ardrey
- A New Social Contract, a 2021 manifesto by Dutch politician Pieter Omtzigt

== Other ==
- "The Social Contract" (House), an episode of House
- The Social Contract Press, a printing company
- Debian Social Contract, which frames the moral agenda of the Debian project
- New Social Contract, a Dutch political party

== See also ==
- Contractualism, ethical theories based on social contract theory
