= Peter Manicas =

Peter Manicas (1934–2015) was a philosopher of science and society at Queens College, City University of New York and the University of Hawaiʻi at Mānoa.

He is the author of many books that include:

- Death of the State
- War and Democracy
- Logic as Philosophy
- A History and Philosophy of the Social Sciences
- A Realist Philosophy of the Social Sciences
- Social Process in Hawaii
- Rescuing Dewey: Essays in Pragmatic Naturalism

Following description of his book: A History and Philosophy of the Social Sciences, provides some of the core elements of his thought which are radically different from mainstream views. This book is in three main parts: (I)It deals first with the history of certain key ideas from the early modern period (assessing thinkers from Hobbes and Marx to Hegel, Weber and Kuhn, (II) before exploring the institutional and social features which have shaped the emergence of modern social science,(III) concluding by suggesting an alternative realist philosophy for the future. This ambitious critical history of the variety of the disciplines we group together as social sciences argues that the defining characteristic of social science, both historically and in the present, is ideology. Based originally on a flawed idea of science, the ‘social sciences’ have incorporated and refined a set of assumptions about the nature of state and society, assumptions which have been institutionalized with the growth of modern universities. A deep moral vision informs this study. A (if not the) principle moral of Professor Manicas's historical sketch is that ‘the modern social sciences have been, unwittingly or not, defenders of the status quo; (p. 276)… Despite this history, ‘social science is potentially liberating’ (ibid.). But, the human sciences can be liberating disciplines, humanizing practices, only if they empower people to see that ‘while social reality is real enough, it is not like unchanging nature, but is just that which is sustained by human activities, activities regarding which human have the only say’ (ibid.). This means, in effect, empowering human beings to see themselves as “causal agents” and as such, beings ‘capable of re-fashioning society in the direction of greater humanity, freedom, and justice’ (p. 277). Vincent Colapietro, Pennsylvania State University, Society for the Advancement of American Philosophy, Newsletter

== External ==
- https://web.archive.org/web/20120912171516/http://www2.hawaii.edu/~manicas/
- https://obits.staradvertiser.com/2016/01/08/peter-t-manicas/
