= William Skocpol =

American physicist and academic

William Skocpol (born 1946 in Akron, Ohio) is an American physicist of Czech ancestry and an emeritus academic at Boston University.

== Biography ==
He grew up in Crete, Nebraska from 1948 to 1957 and Richardson, Texas from 1957 to 1964. He graduated with a BA in physics from Michigan State University in 1968, with an MA in physics from Harvard University in 1971 and a PhD from Harvard in 1974.

He worked as junior faculty at Harvard University from 1969 to 1980, at AT&T Bell Labs in Holmdel, New Jersey from 1980 to 1987, and at Boston University from 1987 to 2014.

He was elected Fellow of the American Physical Society in 1987.

He married the sociologist Theda Barron in 1967; they have a son, Michael, born in 1988.
