= Sarah Reckhow =

American political scientist and professor

- Education: Harvard College; University of California, Berkeley
- Spouse: Matt Grossmann (m. 2007)
- Scientific career
- Fields: Political science
- Workplaces: Michigan State University

Sarah Reckhow is an American political scientist and professor at Michigan State University whose research focuses on philanthropy, education policy, and urban governance. She has authored books and articles examining the influence of private funding on public education systems and the dynamics of nonprofit and philanthropic involvement in local governance.

== Early life and education ==
Reckhow was born to Kenneth and Ellen Reckhow. She completed a B.A. in social studies at Harvard College, graduating magna cum laude in 2002. She earned a Ph.D. in political science at the University of California, Berkeley in 2009.

== Career ==
Reckhow joined Michigan State University (MSU) as an assistant professor in the department of political science in 2009. She was promoted to associate professor in 2017 and became a full professor in 2023. At MSU, she also served as the director of graduate studies in the department of political science from 2019 to 2023.

Reckhow's academic work has focused on the intersections of philanthropy, education policy, and urban governance. She is the author of Follow the Money: How Foundation Dollars Change Public School Politics (2013), which examines how private philanthropic contributions influence public education systems. She co-authored Outside Money in School Board Elections: The Nationalization of Education Politics (2019), further exploring the role of external funding in educational governance.

Reckhow has engaged in applied policy work through initiatives like InnovateGov, a program at MSU aimed at connecting students with public service opportunities in Detroit. InnovateGov, started after the Detroit bankruptcy, facilitates internships with local public agencies and nonprofits. Reckhow directed the program during its early years and oversaw its expansion to include internship placements for MSU students.

During the 2018 to 2019 academic year, she was a fellow at the Harvard Radcliffe Institute. While there, she began work on her book, Governing Without Government, which examines the weakening of local governmental structures and the increasing reliance on philanthropic and nonprofit entities in urban governance.

Reckhow has received multiple research grants, including funding from the Institute of Education Sciences, the Spencer Foundation, and the W.T. Grant Foundation, for studies focusing on education policy and philanthropy's role in shaping public policy discourse.

== Personal life ==
Reckhow married Matt Grossmann a fellow professor of political science, on June 2, 2007, in Durham, North Carolina. Together, they co-own "Hooked," a bookstore, coffee shop, and wine bar located in East Lansing, Michigan. The establishment was inspired by their experiences in Cambridge, Massachusetts.
