= Wolfgang Streeck =

German economic sociologist (born 1946)

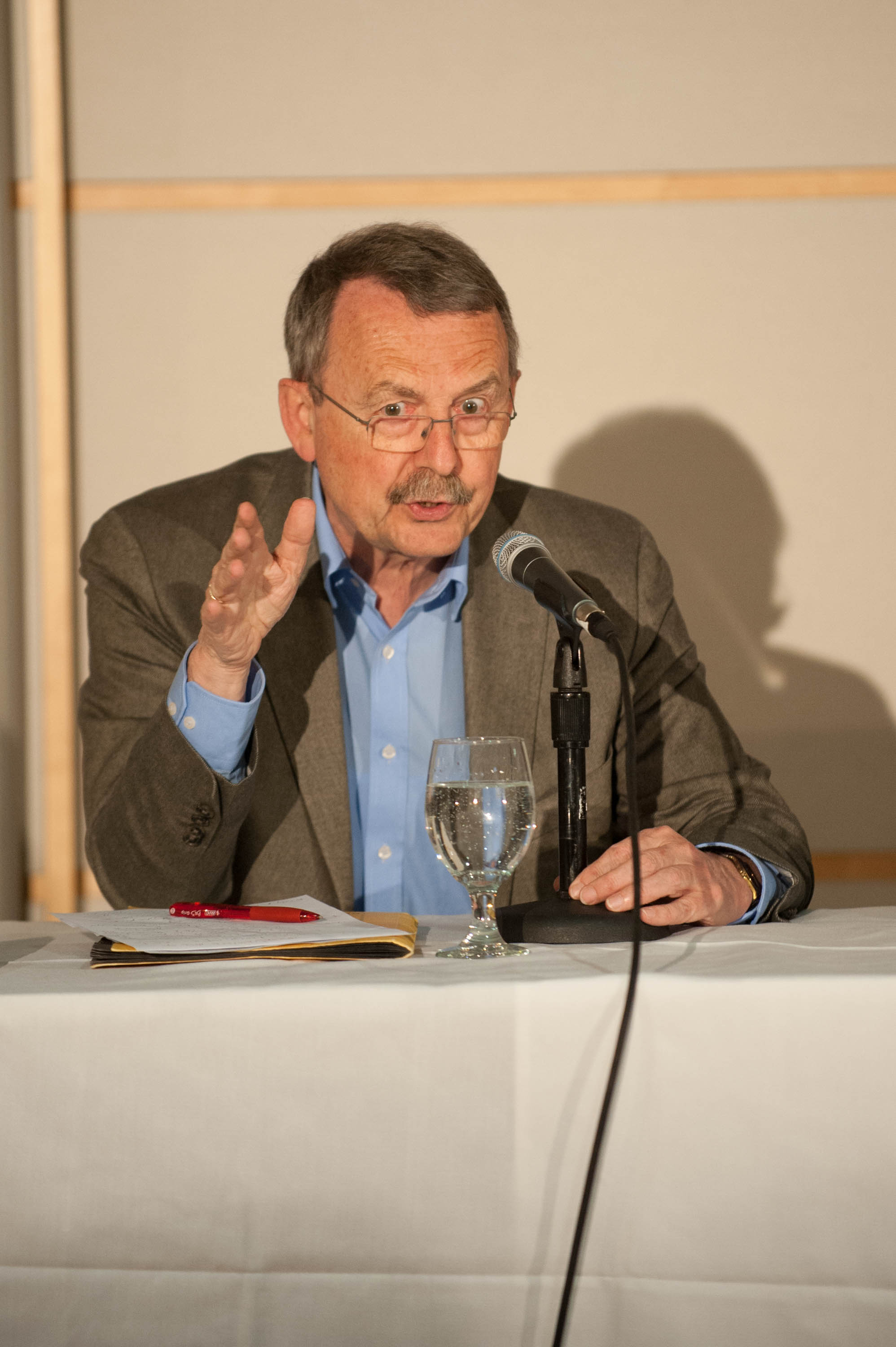
"How Will Capitalism End: Reflections on a Failing System", a 2017 lecture by Streeck

Wolfgang Streeck (German: [ʃtʀeːk]; born 27 October 1946) is a German economic sociologist and emeritus director of the Max Planck Institute for the Study of Societies in Cologne.

== Early life ==
Streeck was born "just outside Münster", the son of refugees—ethnic Germans from eastern Europe displaced at the end of the Second World War. His mother was a Sudeten German from Czechoslovakia. Streeck studied sociology at the Goethe University Frankfurt and pursued graduate studies in the same discipline at Columbia University between 1972 and 1974.

== Career ==
In 1974, Streeck became assistant professor in sociology at the University of Münster and in 1986 finished his habilitation in sociology at Bielefeld University. Between 1988 and 1995, he worked as professor of sociology and industrial relations at the University of Wisconsin–Madison, returning to Germany in 1995 to take up the post of director of the Max Planck Institute for the Study of Societies and working as professor of sociology at the University of Cologne. He retired from his directorship in 2014, becoming emeritus director.

== Academic contributions ==
Streeck's early research focused on industrial relations, trade unions, and the "German model" of coordinated market economy. Following the 2008 financial crisis, his work shifted towards a critical macrosociology of capitalism, analyzing the structural tensions between capitalist markets and democratic politics.

=== Delayed crisis of democratic capitalism ===
In his 2013 book Gekaufte Zeit (translated as Buying Time: The Delayed Crisis of Democratic Capitalism), Streeck argues that the political economy of the Western world since the 1970s has been defined by a strategy of "buying time" to defer a crisis of legitimacy. He outlines a chronological transformation of the state's method for managing class conflict: first through inflation (1970s), then through public debt (1980s), and finally through private debt and financial deregulation (1990s and 2000s). A central concept in this analysis is the conflict between two constituencies that the modern state must serve: the Staatsvolk (the national citizenry operating through rights and elections) and the Marktvolk (international creditors and investors operating through interest rates and confidence). Streeck posits that the 2008 crisis marked the victory of the Marktvolk, leading to the emergence of the "Consolidation State", prioritized with austerity and shielding the economy from mass democratic demands.

=== End of capitalism as a stable social system and the interregnum ===
Expanding on his crisis theory, Streeck argued in his 2016 book How Will Capitalism End? that capitalism is disintegrating not due to the rise of a revolutionary opposition but from an "overdose of itself". He suggests that the system has destroyed the institutional constraints (such as strong trade unions and social democracy) that previously stabilized it. Streeck characterizes the current era as an "interregnum"—a period of systemic disorder and social entropy where the old order is dying but a new one cannot be born. He identifies five converging disorders that afflict contemporary capitalism: secular stagnation, oligarchic redistribution, the plundering of the public domain, systemic corruption, and international anarchy.

=== Globalization and the state ===
In his 2024 work Taking Back Control?: States and State Systems After Globalism, Streeck analyzes the decline of the neoliberal globalization era. He argues that the promise of a "globalist" order has failed, leading societies to seek protection through the restoration of the nation-state. Streeck defends the nation-state not from a nationalist perspective but as the only available institutional container capable of imposing social obligations on capitalism and sustaining democratic politics. Streeck is highly critical of the European Union (EU), which he redefines in this work not as a federation in the making but as a "Liberal Empire". He argues that the EU features a hegemonic center (primarily Germany) that imposes strict market disciplines on the periphery (Southern Europe), effectively disabling their democratic sovereignty to devalue currency or manage deficits. He proposes a segmented system of smaller sovereign states cooperating loosely as an alternative to rigid supranational integration.

== Personal life ==
Streeck and his wife live in part of the farmyard of a castle in Brühl, a small town close to Cologne.

== Books ==
Besides numerous articles published in various European journals, Streeck authored scores of books, some of them available in translations.

- Taking Back Control?: States and State Systems After Globalism. Verso Books, London, 2024. ISBN 9781839767296
- Critical Encounters. Capitalism, Democracy, Ideas. Verso Books, London 2020, ISBN 978-1-78873-874-3
- Governing Interests: Business Associations Facing Internationalization. Routledge, 2006, ISBN 0-415-36486-8
- How Will Capitalism End?: Essays on a Failing System. Verso Books, Brooklyn 2016, ISBN 978-1-78478-401-0
- Buying Time: The Delayed Crisis of Democratic Capitalism. Verso Books, London 2014, ISBN 978-1-78168-548-8
- Re-Forming Capitalism: Institutional Change in the German Political Economy. Oxford University Press, Oxford 2009. ISBN 978-0-19-957398-1with Colin Crouch: The Diversity of Democracy: Corporatism, Social Order and Political Conflict. Edward Elgar Publishing, 2006, ISBN 1-84542-613-4
- with Colin Crouch: Political Economy of Modern Capitalism: Mapping Convergence and Diversity. SAGE, 1997, ISBN 0-7619-5653-0
- with Ruth Dukes: Democracy at Work: Contract, Status and Post-Industrial Justice, Cambridge: Polity 2022. ISBN 978-1-5095-4899-6
- with Kathleen Ann Thelen: Beyond Continuity: Institutional Change in Advanced Political Economies. Oxford University Press, 2005, ISBN 0-19-928046-0
- with Kôzô Yamamura: The Origins of Nonliberal Capitalism: Germany and Japan in Comparison. Cornell University Press, 2001, ISBN 0-8014-3917-5
