= Urban politics in the United States =

American urban politics refers to politics within cities of the United States of America. City governments, run by mayors or city councils, hold a restricted amount of governing power. State and federal governments have been granted a large portion of city governance as laid out in the U.S. Constitution.

The small remaining power held by individual cities becomes a target of numerous outside influences such as large corporations and real-estate developers. American Urban Politics determine the socio-economic make-up of urban neighborhoods and contribute to the ever present disparity between Urban America and Suburban America.

== Local power distribution ==
Three main systems of city government describe local power distribution in the United States: mayor-council systems, the commission plan and the council-manager plan.

The mayor–council government has two variants, the weak-mayor system and the strong-mayor system. Under the weak-mayor system the mayor has extremely limited power and is forced to share power with other locally elected officials. The strong-mayor system allows the mayor to appoint certain officials and gives the mayor some veto powers. Some communities have given the mayor additional veto, appointment, or reporting authorities, with some granting their mayors the power to initiate hiring or involuntary termination of the professional manager.

A city commission government consists of five to nine elected members of a city council who also serve as the heads of major city departments. This form of government blends legislative and executive branch functions in the same body. Proponents of the council-manager form typically consider the city commission form to be the predecessor of, not the alternative to, the council-manager form of government. City governments search for an equilibrium in their relations with the external environment. Urban politics is politics in and about cities. This term refers to the diverse political structure that occurs in urban areas where there is diversity in both race and socioeconomic status. City governments search for an equilibrium in their relations with the external environment. A city government's orientation reflects both its leaders' aspirations and its tax-services balance. politics plays an important role in explaining the path and direction a city chooses. A city's economic development functions and for the political decision to mobilize public capital. City investment in, and regulation of, development projects is the most effective means by which a city controls and molds its growth in pursuit of its future cityscape.

A council–manager government consists of a city council that appoints a professionally trained manager who is given responsibility for running the daily affairs of the city. The city council possesses the authority to remove any unsatisfactory manager at any time needed.

== Urban regime theories ==
Urban regime theories seek to explain relationships among elected officials and those individuals who influence their decisions.

Corporate regimes or development regimes promote growth and normally reflect the interests of a city's major corporations while neglecting the interests of poor, distressed areas of a city.

Caretaker regimes normally oppose large-scale development projects in fear of increased taxes and disrupting normal ways of life.

Progressive regimes respond to the needs of lower- and middle-class citizens and environmental groups to keep things as they are, rather than to economic growth.

Intergovernmental regimes exist in cities of extreme need that are mismanaged and financially troubled. The governor and state legislators are important regime actors.

== History of urban America ==
During the westward expansion period of the 18th and 19th centuries, numerous areas were settled as trading posts along major transportation routes. Sometimes called “walking cities” because of their small size and limited mode of transportation, these areas were economic centers that had not yet experienced the influx of population that came with industrialization and immigration.

As industry and transportation technologies improved, American cities became centers of production and the process of urbanization began to take place. The country became increasingly urban, and cities grew not only in terms of population but also in size, with skyscrapers pushing cities upward and new transportation systems extending them outward. Part of the urban population growth was fueled by an unprecedented mass immigration to the United States that continued unabated into the first two decades of the twentieth century. Cities became locations of opportunity that drove rural to urban migration, but the waves of people also led to congestion, overcrowded housing, undesirable living conditions, poor sanitation and major health epidemics.

As these problems persisted the rich and affluent citizens left the problems in the central city and moved to the outer edges, thus beginning the first stages of suburbanization that carried on well into the 20th century. Suburbanization boomed following the invention of railroads, automobiles, assembly-line production and telecommunications. Urban America slowly lost its importance and moved toward a metropolitan America that, in most cases, consisted of poor, underdeveloped, old-city centers, surrounded by wealthy, developed suburbs and edge-cities.

== See also ==
- Category:Politics of the United States by city
- Category:Mayoral elections in the United States by city
- Category:Local government in the United States
- The Wire (fictional television program about Baltimore)
