= Theda Skocpol =

American sociologist and political scientist (born 1947)

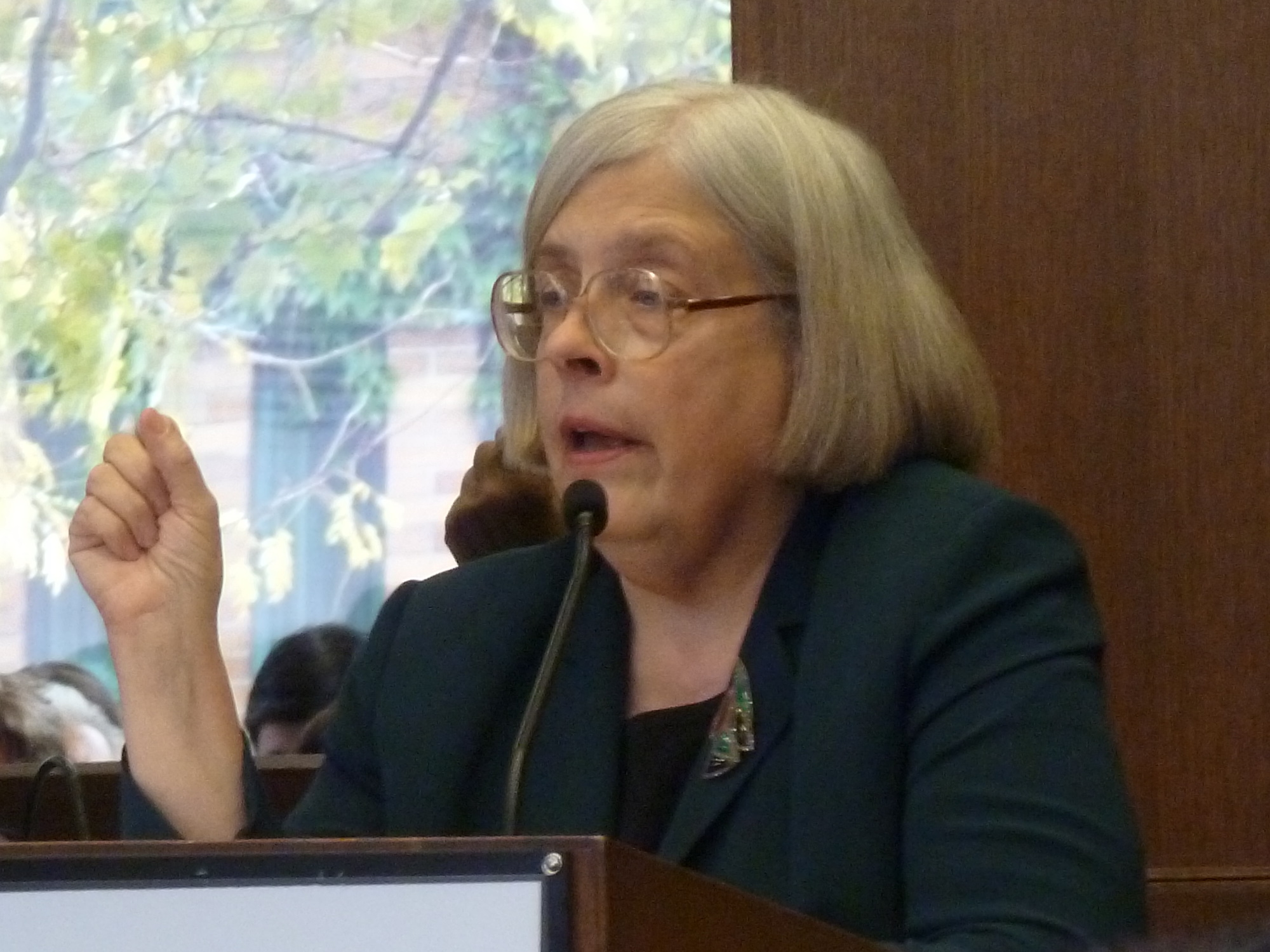
- Skocpol in 2011
- Born: May 4, 1947 (age 79); Detroit, Michigan, U.S.
- Known for: States and Social Revolutions; Diminished Democracy; State Autonomy Theory
- Awards: Johan Skytte Prize

Academic background
- Education: Michigan State University (BA); Harvard University (MA, PhD)
- Doctoral advisor: George Homans
- Other advisors: Daniel Bell; Seymour Martin Lipset; Barrington Moore, Jr.

Academic work
- Discipline: Sociology; Political science
- Sub-discipline: Comparative sociology; Policy analysis
- Institutions: Harvard University
- Doctoral students: Edwin Amenta; Elisabeth S. Clemens; Grzegorz Ekiert; Marshall Ganz; Jeff Goodwin
- Main interests: Civic engagement; Historical institutionalism; American political development

Signature
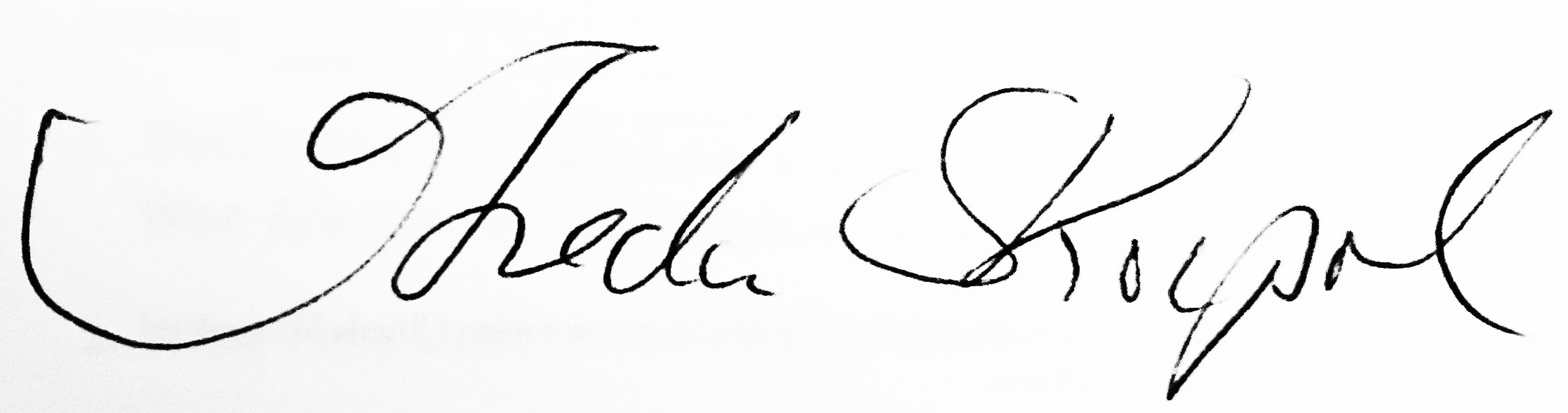

Theda Skocpol (née Barron; May 4, 1947) is an American sociologist and political scientist, who is currently the Victor S. Thomas Professor of Government and Sociology at Harvard University. She is best known as an advocate of the historical-institutional and comparative approaches, as well as her "state autonomy theory". She has written widely for both popular and academic audiences. She has been President of the American Political Science Association and the Social Science History Association.

In historical sociology, Skocpol's works and opinions have been associated with the structuralist school. As an example, she argues that social revolutions can best be explained given their relation with specific structures of agricultural societies and their respective states. Such an approach differs greatly from more "behaviorist" ones, which tend to emphasize the role of "revolutionary populations", "revolutionary psychology", and/or "revolutionary consciousness", as determinant factors of revolutionary processes.

Her 1979 book States and Social Revolutions was influential in research on revolutions.

== Biography ==
Theda Skocpol was born in Detroit, Michigan on May 4, 1947. Both of her parents, Jennie Mae Becker Barron and Allan Barron, were teachers. Her mother wanted her to study home economics at a small liberal arts college, while her father was concerned about the cost of college education. She earned her BA in sociology at Michigan State University in 1969. While she attended Michigan State, she participated in the antiwar movement in response to the Vietnam War. Through the Methodist student association, she went to Rust College, a historically black college in Holly Springs, Mississippi, to teach English and math to incoming freshmen. Many of the students were from sharecropper families, and were first-generation college students. She called her time in Mississippi observing racism and segregation "life-changing". She then went on to earn both her MA (1972) and PhD at Harvard University (1975). While attending Harvard, Skocpol studied with Barrington Moore Jr. Her first published article, in 1973, was a critique of Moore's Social Origins of Dictatorship and Democracy. Her PhD committee at Harvard were George Homans, Daniel Bell, and Seymour Martin Lipset.

From 1975 to 1981, Skocpol served as an assistant and associate professor of sociology, at Harvard. During this time, Skocpol published her first of many books, States and Social Revolutions: A Comparative Analysis of Social Revolutions in Russia, France and China (1979). Some of her subsequent work focused on methodology and theory, including the co-edited volume Bringing the State Back In, which heralded a new focus by social scientists on the state as an agent of social and political change.

In 1981, Skocpol moved on to work at the University of Chicago. For the next five years, Skocpol would serve as an associate professor of Sociology and Political Science, and of Social Science, and Director for the Center for the Study of Industrial Societies.

In the early 1980s, Skocpol publicly alleged that Harvard University had denied her tenure (1980) because she was a woman. This charge was found to be justified by an internal review committee in 1981. In 1984, Harvard University offered Skocpol a tenured position (its first ever for a female sociologist), which she accepted.

From 1986 to the present, Skocpol has held various positions at Harvard University including: Professor of Sociology; Director for the Center for American Political Studies; Dean of the Graduate School of Arts and Sciences; and the Victor S. Thomas Professor of Government and Sociology.

== Honors and titles ==
Throughout her career, Skocpol has held many positions at various academic, and professional organizations, some of which include: president of Politics and History Section, chairperson, and later Council member of the American Political Science Association (1991–1996). Out of over one hundred past presidents, since 1903, only about ten women have held that office. Skocpol is also Founder and Co-Editor, Princeton Studies in American Politics: Historical, Comparative, and International Perspectives (1993 – present); and Senior Advisor in the Social Sciences, Radcliffe Institute for Advanced Study (2006–2008).

According to her Curriculum Vitae Skocpol has been distinguished by over twenty awards and honors, some of which are: C. Wright Mills Award of The Society for the Study of Social Problems in 1979; elected to the American Philosophical Society in 2006; and she was elected to the National Academy of Sciences in 2008. Her book Protecting Soldiers and Mothers (1992) was awarded the 1993 Woodrow Wilson Award for best book in political science by the American Political Science Association. She is also an elected member of the American Academy of Arts and Sciences and the American Philosophical Society.

In 2007, she was awarded the Johan Skytte Prize in Political Science, one of the world's most prestigious prizes in political science for her "visionary analysis of the significance of the state for revolutions, welfare, and political trust, pursued with theoretical depth and empirical evidence."

In 2015, she was named an Andrew Dickson White Professor-at-Large at Cornell University (term: 2015–2021).

In October 2019, Skocpol was awarded with an honorary doctorate from Radboud University in Nijmegen.

Historian Julian Zelizer of Princeton University wrote that few scholars have been so influential as Skocpol has been upon the historians at Harvard University and that he considers her a pioneer in the scholarly field examining American political development.

== Major works and contributions ==
=== States and Social Revolutions (1979) ===
Skocpol's most famous book, States and Social Revolutions: A Comparative Analysis of Social Revolutions in Russia, France and China (1979), discusses how most theories account only for direct action in bringing about revolutions. Social Revolutions are fast-paced foundational transformations of society's state and class structures. She includes the structure involved in creating a revolutionary situation that can lead to a social revolution – one that changes civic institutions and government once the administration and military branches collapse.

In her text, Skocpol "offers a framework of reference for analyzing social-revolutionary transformations in modern world history" and discusses and compares the causes of the French Revolution of 1787–1800, the Russian Revolution of 1917–1921, and the 1911 Revolution.

According to Skocpol, there are two stages to social revolutions: a crisis of state and the emergence of a dominant class to take advantage of a revolutionary situation. The crisis of state emerges from poor economy, natural disaster, food shortage, or security concerns. Leaders of the revolution also have to face these constraints, and their handling of them affects how well they re-establish the state.

Skocpol uses Marxism's class struggle to assert that the main causes of social unrest are state social structures, international competitive pressures, international demonstrations, and class relations. Critics suggest that Skocpol ignores the role of individuals and ideology and uses varied comparative methodological strategies.

=== State autonomy theory ===
Before she wrote Protecting Soldiers and Mothers, Skocpol first devised what she termed state autonomy theory. This theory underlined the idea that state bureaucracies could have the potential for autonomous operations, and that this potential was ignored by scientists who were focused on society-centric studies. Skocpol considers the idea that parties are more important in America than the government, and that class dominance plays heavily into American politics.

=== Protecting Soldiers and Mothers (1992) ===
In this book, Skocpol shows, contrary to the conventional wisdom, that the United States was a precocious welfare state in the early 20th century and that it did not lag behind European states at that point in time.

In the book, Skocpol considers increased benefits for Civil War veterans and their families resulting from competitive party politics, as well as greater actions taken in women's movements. Soldiers and mothers benefited from social spending, labor regulations, and health education through reformative women's clubs across the nation. Simultaneously, Skocpol repudiates her previous claim (put forward as part of her state autonomy theory) that most other theorists had ignored states' independent power, explaining "my state-centered theoretical frame of reference had evolved into a fully 'polity-centered approach'. Her revised view is that social movements, coalitions of pressure groups, and political parties must be given their due in understanding power in America."

Skocpol explains how clubs and associations fill the vacuum left by fewer bureaucracies and an official church throughout the country, offering a case study in how women succeeded in gaining labor rights, mothers' pensions, minimum wage, and subsidized natal health clinics. Further, Skocpol points out that women were able to overcome class disparity to achieve these goals, working at a national level, influencing representatives with books, TV, magazines, and meetings.

=== Diminished Democracy (2003) ===
Diminished Democracy discusses the changes in US public involvement and its recent concerning decline. Skocpol talks about how to reverse it in explaining how the U.S. became a civic nation, the organizers of that movement, management of civic organizations, changes in them, the harmful effects of that change, and how to recreate a sense of citizenship.

Since fewer and fewer Americans join voluntary groups that meet frequently, there has been a proliferation of nonprofit groups led by elites who can interact with the government, but not the people. Skocpol provokes the reader with the idea that civic involvement will one day become another job rather than a civilian responsibility.

=== Scholars Strategy Network ===
In 2009, Skocpol conceived of and co-founded the Scholars Strategy Network, an association of academics and researchers who coordinate to address public challenges while increasing the accessibility of their findings to those outside of academia. As of 2018, she serves as the network's Director.

== Personal life ==
In 1967, while studying at Michigan State University, she married Bill Skocpol. They were both students at Michigan State, with Bill a physics major from Texas. They had met through a Methodist organization for students. Her last name is sometimes quoted as Skočpol. She has one son, Michael Skocpol, an attorney and former law clerk for Sonia Sotomayor.

She is also an avid American football fan. In 2023, she helped rescue a postal carrier being attacked by a pair of turkeys.

== Publications ==
=== Books ===
- Skocpol, Theda (1979). States and Social Revolutions: A Comparative Analysis of France, Russia, and China. Canto Classics. Cambridge, England: Cambridge University Press. ISBN 978-0-521-29499-7.
- Skocpol, Theda (1992). Protecting Soldiers and Mothers: The Political Origins of Social Policy in the United States. Cambridge, Massachusetts: Belknap Press of Harvard University Press. ISBN 978-0-674-71765-7.
- Skocpol, Theda (1994). Social Revolutions in the Modern World. Cambridge Studies in Comparative Politics. Cambridge, England: Cambridge University Press. ISBN 978-0-521-40938-4.
- Skocpol, Theda (1995). Social Policy in the United States: Future Possibilities in Historical Perspective. Princeton, New Jersey: Princeton University Press. ISBN 978-0-691-03785-1.
- Finegold, Kenneth; Skocpol, Theda (1995). State and Party in America's New Deal. Madison, Wisconsin: University of Wisconsin Press. ISBN 978-0-299-14764-8.
- Skocpol, Theda (1996). Boomerang: Clinton's Health Security Effort and the Turn Against Government in U.S. Politics. New York, New York: W. W. Norton & Company. ISBN 978-0-393-03970-2.
- Skocpol, Theda (1997). Boomerang: Health Reform and the Turn Against Government. New York, New York: W. W. Norton & Company. ISBN 978-0-393-31572-1.
- Skocpol, Theda (2000). The Missing Middle: Working Families and the Future of American Social Policy. The Century Foundation. New York, New York: W. W. Norton & Company. ISBN 978-0-393-32113-5.
- Skocpol, Theda (2003). Diminished Democracy: From Membership to Management in American Civic Life. The Julian J. Rothbaum Distinguished Lecture Series. Vol. 8. Norman, Oklahoma: University of Oklahoma Press. ISBN 978-0-8061-5017-8.
- Skocpol, Theda; Liazos, Ariane; Ganz, Marshall (2006). What a Mighty Power We Can Be: African American Fraternal Groups and the Struggle for Racial Equality. Princeton, New Jersey: Princeton University Press. ISBN 978-0-691-12299-1.
- Skocpol, Theda; Bartels, Larry M; Edwards, Mickey; Mettler, Suzanne (2012). Obama and America's Political Future. Cambridge, Massachusetts: Harvard University Press. ISBN 978-0-674-07164-3.
- Skocpol, Theda; Williamson, Vanessa (2012). The Tea Party and the Remaking of Republican Conservatism. Oxford: Oxford University Press. ISBN 978-0-19-983263-7.
- Skocpol, Theda; Newman, Lainey (2023). Rust Belt Union Blues: Why Working-Class Voters Are Turning Away from the Democratic Party. New York: Columbia University Press. ISBN 978-0-23-120882-6.

=== Edited volumes ===
- Burawoy, Michael; Skocpol, Theda, eds. (1982). Marxist Inquiries: Studies of Labor, Class, and States. American Journal of Sociology supplement. Vol. 88. Chicago, Illinois: University of Chicago Press. ISBN 978-0-226-08040-6.
- Skocpol, Theda, ed. (1984). Vision and Method in Historical Sociology. Cambridge, England: Cambridge University Press. ISBN 978-0-521-29724-0.
- Evans, Peter B.; Rueschemeyer, Dietrich; Skocpol, Theda, eds. (1985). Bringing the State Back In. Cambridge, England: Cambridge University Press. ISBN 978-1-107-71713-8.
- Weir, Margaret; Orloff, Ann Shola; Skocpol, Theda, eds. (1988). The Politics of Social Policy in the United States. Princeton, New Jersey: Princeton University Press. ISBN 978-0-691-09436-6.
- American Society and Politics: Institutional, Historical, and Theoretical Perspectives (with John L. Campbell), McGraw-Hill (New York), 1995.
- States, Social Knowledge, and the Origins of Modern Social Policies (with Dietrich Rueschemeyer), Princeton University Press, 1996.
- The New Majority: Toward a Popular Progressive Politics (with Stan Greenberg), Yale University Press (New Haven, CT), 1997.
- Democracy, Revolution, and History (with George Ross, Tony Smith, and Judith Eisenberg Vichniac), Cornell University Press (Ithaca, NY), 1998.
- Civic Engagement in American Democracy (with Morris P. Fiorina), Brookings Institution Press (Washington, DC)/Russell Sage Foundation (New York City), 1999.
- The Transformation of American Politics: Activist Government and the Rise of Conservatism (with Paul Pierson), Princeton University Press, 2007.
- Reaching for a New Deal: Ambitious Governance, Economic Meltdown, and Polarized Politics in Obama's First Two Years (with Lawrence R. Jacobs, Russell Sage Foundation (New York), 2011.
- Upending American Politics: Polarizing Parties, Ideological Elites, and Citizen Activists from the Tea Party to the Anti-Trump Resistance (with Caroline Tervo), Oxford University Press (New York), 2020.

=== Select articles ===
- A Critical Review of Barrington Moore's Social Origins of Dictatorship and Democracy. Politics and Society, 4(1), pp. 1–34
- Review article: "Cultural Idioms and Political Ideologies in the Revolutionary Reconstruction of State Power: A Rejoinder to Sewell," The Journal of Modern History Vol. 57, No. 1, March 1985

== See also ==
- Social policy
- Comparative politics
- New institutionalism
- Historical institutionalism
- Historical sociology
- The state
- Revolution
- Barrington Moore Jr.
- Charles Tilly
