= Pepper D. Culpepper =

American political scientist (born 1968)

Pepper Dagenhart Culpepper
- Born: October 1, 1968 (age 58)

Academic background
- Education: Duke University (B.A.), Oxford University (M.Litt.), Harvard University (M.A., Ph.D.)

Pepper Dagenhart Culpepper (born October 1, 1968) is an American political scientist.

Culpepper obtained a bachelor of arts in political science at Duke University in 1990. He received a Marshall Scholarship, with which he pursued a Master of Letters in political science at Oxford University, graduating in 1992. Culpepper returned to the United States, enrolling at Harvard University, where he completed a master of arts and doctorate both in political science. He began teaching at Harvard in 1998 as an assistant professor of public policy, one year before obtaining his Ph.D. Culpepper became an associate professor in 2003. He left Harvard in 2009, for a position at the European University Institute. Culpepper moved to the University of Oxford in 2016, as a professorial fellow of Trinity College, Oxford and professor of politics and public policy. In 2018, Culpepper became a professorial fellow of Nuffield College, Oxford, and was appointed the Blavatnik Professor of Government and Public Policy within the Blavatnik School of Government.

Culpepper's book Quiet Politics and Business Power: Corporate Control in Europe and Japan (Cambridge University Press, 2011) was awarded the 2012 Stein Rokkan Prize for Comparative Social Science Research.
