= Kathleen Thelen =

American political scientist (born 1956)

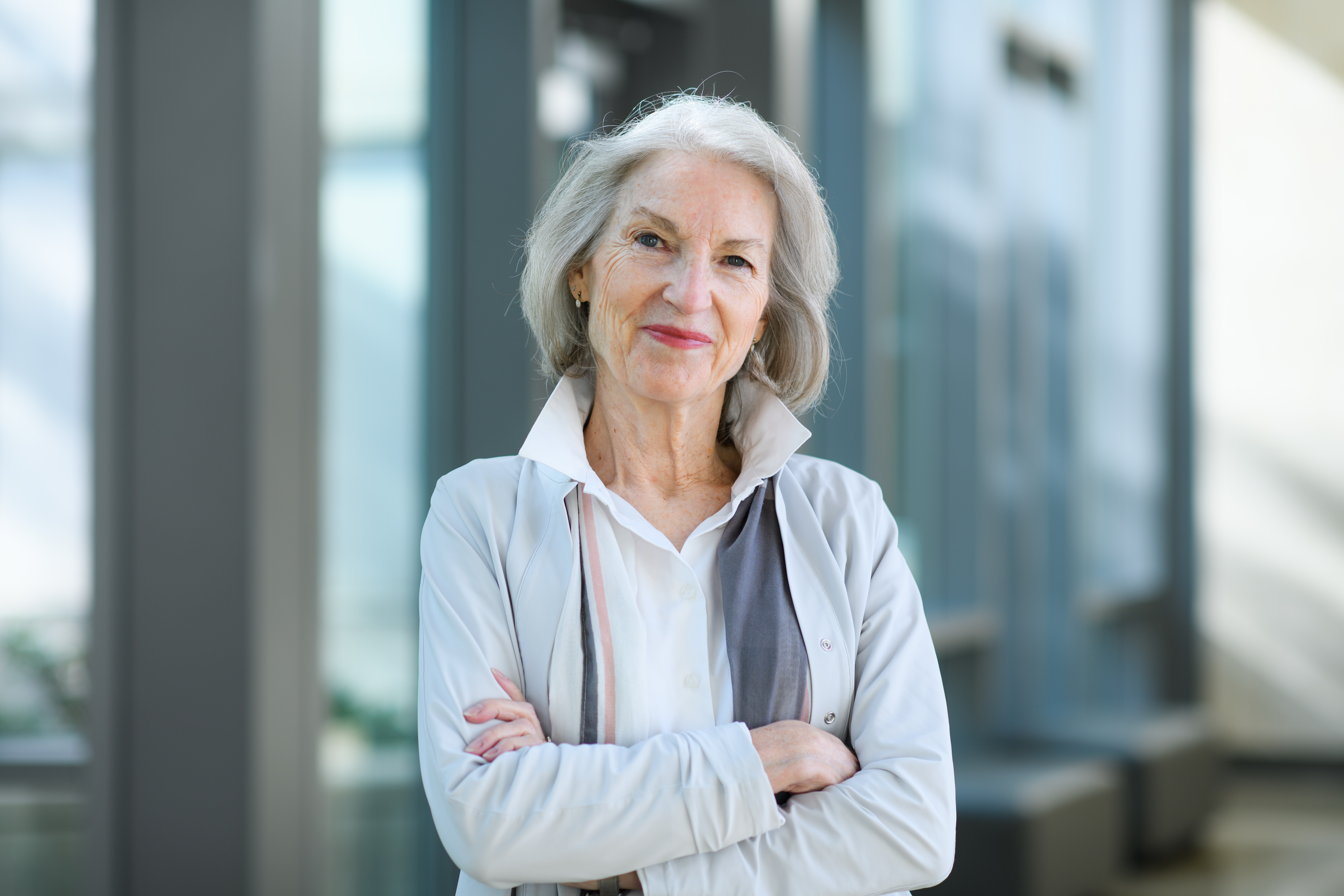
- Born: 1956 (age 69–70)
- Education: University of California, Berkeley (MA, PhD); University of Kansas (BA)
- Scientific career
- Fields: Political science
- Workplaces: Massachusetts Institute of Technology; Princeton University; Northwestern University

Kathleen Thelen is an American political scientist specializing in comparative politics. She is the Ford Professor of Political Science at the Massachusetts Institute of Technology (MIT), a permanent external member of the Max Planck Institute for the Study of Societies (MPIfG), and a faculty associate at the Center for European Studies (CES) at Harvard University.

She is known for her research on political-economic institutions, as well as her frameworks for understanding institutional stability and change. She is influential in the field of historical institutionalism.

== Education ==
She received her B.A. from the University of Kansas. During her time at the University of Kansas, she spent a year studying abroad in Munich, Germany; her experience in Germany led her to switch her major from English to Political Science. She was awarded an M.A. and Ph.D. from the University of California, Berkeley. During her time at U.C. Berkeley, she was influenced by faculty members John Zsyman, Gregory Luebbert, Ernst Haas, Reinhard Bendix, and Harold Wilensky, as well as fellow graduate students Jonas Pontusson, Sven Steinmo, Robin Gaster, and Tony Daley. She did her PhD thesis on labor relations in Germany.

== Career ==
She is a leading authority on the origins and evolution of political-economic institutions in the rich democracies. She is among the most highly cited political scientists.

Thelen completed and published her first book, “Union of Parts”, as an assistant professor at Princeton University in 1991. Through an analysis of labor relations in Germany between the 1970s and 1980s, she identified the interaction of centralized bargaining and German work councils as the institutional basis for peaceful, negotiated adjustment in the midst of radical economic and political change.

After moving to Northwestern University in 1994, Thelen wrote a sole-authored article, “Historical Institutionalism in Comparative Politics,” for the Annual Review of Political Science. The article instantly became a classic, and to date scholars have referenced it more than 6,000 times.

In “How Institutions Evolve” (2004), Thelen examines variations in the nineteenth century settlements between employers and skill-intensive workers, artisans, and early trade unions. She finds that the effects of these settlements were incremental, and can only be understood by making sense of specific types of long-run gradual change. For example, she discovered that German Handicraft Protection Law of 1897, originally designed to shore up support among a reactionary artisanal class, was a historical cause of contemporary Germany’s vocational training system. The book co-received the American Political Science Association’s Woodrow Wilson Foundation Award for the best book published in 2004 on government, politics, or international affairs.

Thelen left Northwestern University for MIT in 2009. In 2014, she published her third major substantive book, “Varieties of Liberalization and the New Politics of Social Solidarity.” The book examines contemporary changes in labor market institutions in the United States, Germany, Denmark, Sweden and the Netherlands. While confirming a broad, shared, liberalizing trend, Thelen finds that there are in fact distinct varieties of liberalization associated with very different distributive outcomes. Contrary to the conventional wisdom, her study reveals that the successful defense of the institutions traditionally associated with coordinated capitalism has often been a recipe for increased inequality due to declining coverage and dualization. Conversely, she argues that some forms of labor market liberalization are perfectly compatible with continued high levels of social solidarity and indeed may be necessary to sustain it. The book received prizes from section in both the American Political Science Association (APSA) and the American Sociological Association (ASA).

Thelen has proposed a framework for understanding institutional change, which encompasses:

- Layering: new elements are added to existing elements in an institution
- Drift: an institution is not updated to respond to a changing environment
- Conversion: the rules of an institution are re-interpreted for new purpose
- Displacement: the replacement of an old institution with a new one

In 2022, Thelen co-edited American Political Economy: Politics, Markets, and Power (Cambridge University Press) with Jacob Hacker, Alexander Hertel-Fernandez, and Paul Pierson, part of an ongoing collaborative project on the American political economy funded by the Hewlett Foundation.

In 2025, Thelen published Attention, Shoppers! American Retail Capitalism and the Origins of the Amazon Economy (Princeton University Press), which examines the political and institutional origins of Amazon's dominance in American retail. The book won the American Political Science Association's 2026 Gladys M. Kammerer Award for the best book published in the field of U.S. national policy. Thelen is currently working on The Chamber of Influence: Corporate Power in American Courts, co-authored with Jingtian Chen and Morgan Gillespie, under contract with Princeton University Press.

== Recognition ==
She was elected to the American Academy of Arts and Sciences in 2015 and to the Berlin-Brandenburg Academy of Sciences and Humanities in 2009. She has been awarded honorary degrees at the Vrije Universiteit Amsterdam (2013), the London School of Economics (2017), the European University Institute in Florence (2018) and, most recently, the University of Copenhagen (2018). Thelen received the Max Planck Research Award for Humanities and Social Sciences in 2003 for her work on German politics and political economy, the Michael Endres Research Prize from the Hertie School of Governance, Berlin, and was named an honorary fellow of the Society for the Advancement of Socio-Economics, both in 2019. She went on to also receive the Friedrich Schiedel-Award for politics and technology from the Bavarian School of Public Policy, Munich, in 2020 and most recently was named a Guggenheim Fellow for 2026-27.

Thelen was also elected to serve as President of the American Political Science Association (APSA) from 2017 to 2018. From 2022 to 2023, she served as co-president of the APSA's Organized Section on American Political Economy.

== Personal life ==
Thelen is married to Ben Ross Schneider, who is also a political scientist at MIT.

== Works ==
- Union of Parts: Labor Politics in Postwar Germany. Ithaca, NY: Cornell University Press, 1991
- How Institutions Evolve: The Political Economy of Skills in Germany, Britain, the United States and Japan. New York: Cambridge University Press, 2004
  - Winner (2006) of the Mattei Dogan Award for best book published in the field of comparative research in 2004/2005
  - Co-winner (2005) of the Woodrow Wilson Foundation Award of the American Political Science Association for the best book published in 2004 on government, politics, or international affairs.
  - Chinese and Korean translations 2010 (published by Cambridge in collaboration with Shanghai People’s Publishing House and Motivebook Publishing House).
- Beyond Continuity: Institutional Change in Advanced Political Economies (co-editor with Wolfgang Streeck). Oxford: Oxford University Press, 2005
- Explaining Institutional Change: Ambiguity, Agency, and Power (co-editor with James Mahoney). New York: Cambridge University Press, 2010
  - Winner (2019) of the Aaron Wildavsky Enduring Contribution Award, APSA Section on Public Policy, for the introductory chapter co-authored with James Mahoney.
- Varieties of Liberalization and the New Politics of Social Solidarity. New York: Cambridge University Press, 2014
  - Winner (2015) of the Barrington Moore Book Award of the American Sociological Association, for the “best book in the area of comparative and historical sociology”
  - Co-winner (2015) of the Best Book Award of the American Political Science Association’s Organized Section on European Politics and Society
- Advances in Comparative Historical Analysis (co-edited with James Mahoney). New York: Cambridge University Press, 2015
- American Political Economy: Politics, Markets, and Power (co-edited with Jacob Hacker, Alexander Hertel-Fernandez and Paul Pierson). New York: Cambridge University Press, 2022.
- Attention, Shoppers! American Retail Capitalism and the Origins of the Amazon Economy. Princeton, NJ: Princeton University Press, 2025.
  - Winner (2026) of the American Political Science Association's Gladys M. Kammerer Award for the best book published in the field of U.S. national policy.
