= Scholars Strategy Network =

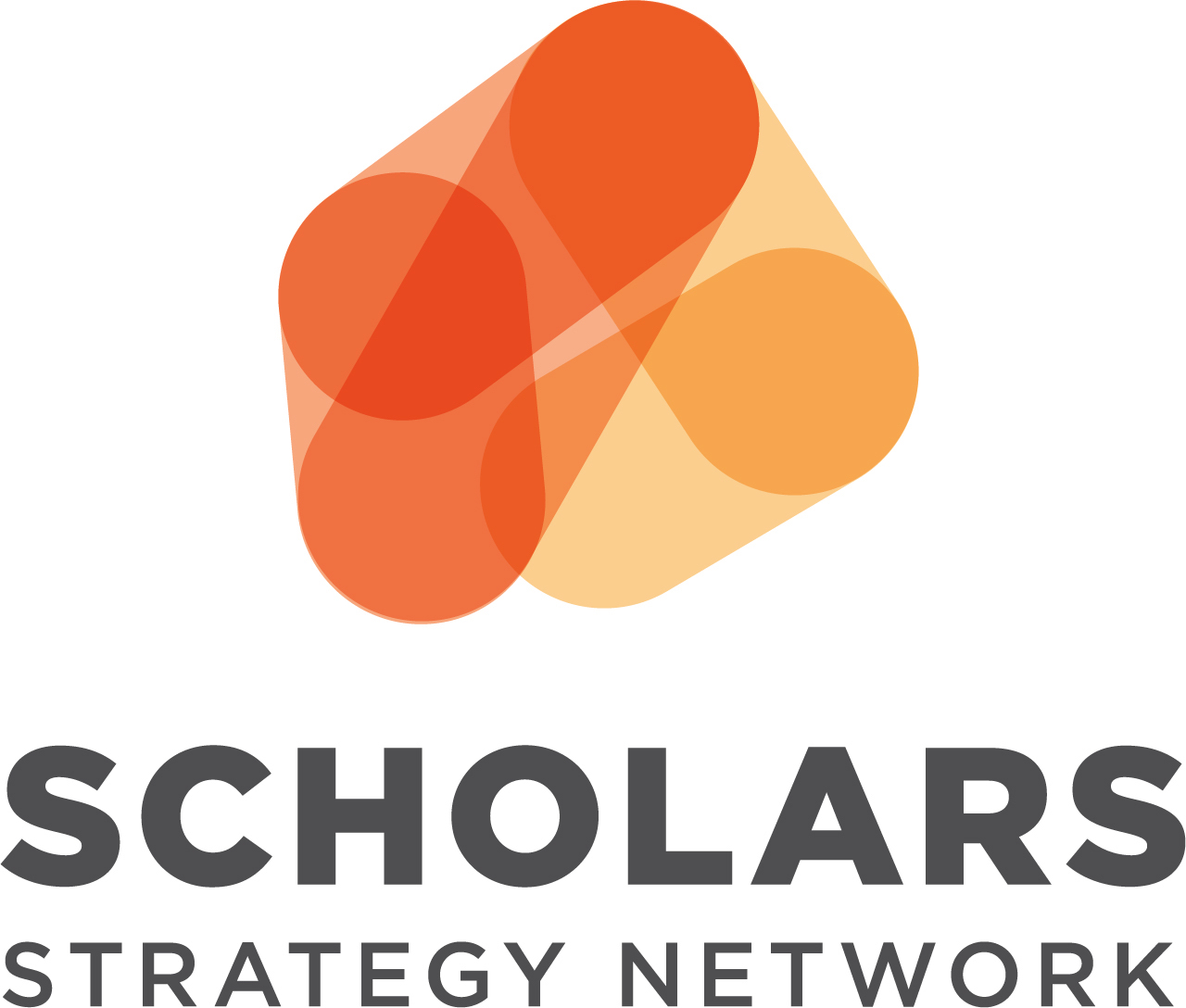
- Formation: 2011
- Founder: Theda Skocpol
- Headquarters: 501 Boylston St. Suite #10A120; Boston, Massachusetts 02116
- Website: www.scholars.org

The Scholars Strategy Network (SSN) is an association of academics and researchers who coordinate to address public challenges while increasing the accessibility of their findings to those outside of academia.

While the work of individual SSN members is typically published in academic journals, the organization encourages its members to write "briefs" about current issues. These shorter pieces, written in consideration of a lay audience, are published on the organization's website.

The idea for the Scholars Strategy Network with an associated website was originally conceived of in 2009 by sociologist and political scientist Theda Skocpol. The association is backed by donors Robert Bowditch, Jr. and David desJardins, both of whom are affiliated with the progressive Democracy Alliance, but the Scholars Strategy Network does not take formal positions on policy questions or support or oppose particular political candidates.

== Regional networks ==
An SSN Regional Network includes scholars who live or work in that region, and each is coordinated by a leader or co-leaders who set the regional agenda and organize discussions and public events.
