= Sociological institutionalism =

Framework within sociology

Sociological institutionalism (also referred to as sociological neoinstitutionalism, cultural institutionalism and world society theory) is a form of new institutionalism that concerns "the way in which institutions create meaning for individuals." Its explanations are constructivist in nature. According to Ronald L. Jepperson and John W. Meyer, Sociological institutionalism

treats the “actorhood” of modern individuals and organizations as itself constructed out of cultural materials – and treats contemporary institutional systems as working principally by creating and legitimating agentic actors with appropriate perspectives, motives, and agendas. The scholars who have developed this perspective have been less inclined to emphasize actors’ use of institutions and more inclined to envision institutional forces as producing and using actors. By focusing on the evolving construction and reconstruction of the actors of modern society, institutionalists can better explain the dramatic social changes of the contemporary period – why these changes cut across social contexts and functional settings, and why they often become worldwide in character.

Sociological institutionalists emphasize how the functions and structures of organizations do not necessarily reflect functional purposes, but rather ceremonies and rituals. Actors comply with institutional rules and norms because other types of behavior are inconceivable; actors follow routines because they take a for-granted quality. The sociological institutionalist perspective stands in contrast to rationalist and instrumental perspectives on actors and agency. The latter see actors as rational, knowledgeable and with clear purpose, whereas the former highlight how actors' behavior reflects habits, superstition, and sentiments. The former sees culture as an irrational residual factor in explaining behavior, whereas the latter sees culture as essential in explaining behavior.

Some sociological institutionalists argue that institutions have developed to become similar (showing an isomorphism) across organizations even though they evolved in different ways. Institutions are therefore seen as important in cementing and propagating cultural norms.

It originated in work by sociologist John Meyer published in 1977.

Sociological institutionalists hold that a "logic of appropriateness" guides the behavior of actors within an institution. It predicts that the norms and formal rules of institutions will shape the actions of those acting within them. According to James March, the logic of appropriateness means that actions are "matched to situations by means of rules organized into identities." Thus normative institutionalism views that much of the behavior of institutional actors is based on the recognized situation that the actors encounter, the identity of the actors in the situation, and the analysis by the actor of the rules that generally govern behavior for that actor in that particular situation.

According to Jack Knight, sociological institutionalism fails to explain behavior where members of an institution fail to act with their defined institutional roles. He argues that it is difficult for sociological institutionalism to explain institutional change.

== See also ==
- World polity theory
- Institutional logic
- Institutional theory
