= New institutionalism =

Sociological view of institutions

Neo institutionalism (also referred to as neo-institutionalist theory or institutionalism) is an approach to the study of institutions that focuses on the constraining and enabling effects of formal and informal rules on the behavior of individuals and groups. New institutionalism traditionally encompasses three major strands: sociological institutionalism, rational choice institutionalism, and historical institutionalism. New institutionalism originated in work by sociologist John Meyer published in 1977.

== History ==
The study of institutions and their interactions has been a focus of academic research for many years. In the late 19th and early 20th century, social theorists began to systematize this body of literature. One of the most prominent examples of this was the work of German economist and social theorist Max Weber; Weber focused on the organizational structure (i.e. bureaucracy) within society, and the institutionalization created by means of the iron cage which organizational bureaucracies create. In Britain and the United States, the study of political institutions dominated political science until the 1950s. This approach, sometimes called 'old' institutionalism, focused on analyzing the formal institutions of government and the state in comparative perspective. It was followed by a behavioral revolution which brought new perspectives to analyzing politics, such as positivism, rational choice theory, and behavioralism, and the narrow focus on institutions was discarded as the focus moved to analyzing individuals rather than the institutions which surrounded them. New Institutionalism was a reaction to the behavioral revolution.

Institutionalism experienced a significant revival in 1977 with two influential papers by John W. Meyer and Brian Rowan on one hand and Lynn Zucker on the other. The revised formulation of institutionalism proposed in this paper prompted a significant shift in the way institutional analysis was conducted. Research that followed became known as "new" institutionalism, a concept that is generally referred to as "neo-institutionalism" in academic literature. Another significant reformulation occurred with Paul DiMaggio and Walter W. Powell's paper on isomorphism. The three papers had in common that they explained the practices of organizations not in terms of efficacy and efficiency, but in terms of legitimacy. The functions of an organization did not necessarily reflect rational or optimal ends, but were instead myths, ceremonies and scripts that had a veneer of rationality.

The following decade saw an explosion of literature on the topic across many disciplines, including those outside of the social sciences. Examples of the body of work in the decade which followed can be found in DiMaggio and Powell's 1991 anthology in the field of sociology; in economics, the Nobel Prize-winning work of Douglass North is a noted example.

More-recent work has begun to emphasize multiple competing logics, focusing on the more-heterogeneous sources of diversity within fields and the institutional embeddedness of technical considerations. The concept of logic generally refers to broader cultural beliefs and rules that structure cognition and guide decision-making in a field. At the organization level, logic can focus the attention of key decision-makers on a delimited set of issues and solutions, leading to logic-consistent decisions that reinforce extant organizational identities and strategies. In line with the new institutionalism, social rule system theory stresses that particular institutions and their organizational instantiations are deeply embedded in cultural, social, and political environments and that particular structures and practices are often reflections of as well as responses to rules, laws, conventions, paradigms built into the wider environment.

=== Old institutionalism ===
Kathleen Thelen and Sven Steinmo contrast New Institutionalism with "Old Institutionalism", which was overwhelmingly focused on detailed narratives of institutions, with little focus on comparative analyses. Thus, the Old Institutionalism was unhelpful for comparative research and explanatory theory. This "Old Institutionalism" began to be undermined when scholars increasingly highlighted how the formal rules and administrative structures of institutions were not accurately describing the behavior of actors and policy outcomes.

=== Definition of institution ===
There is no agreed upon definition of institution in new institutionalist scholarship. Mats Alvesson and Andre Spicer wrote in 2018 that it had become "difficult to agree what an institution is not – because institutions have become everything... When the term institution is defined, it is done so in broad and vague ways."

== Diversity of scholarship ==
Numerous scholarly approaches have been described as being part of New institutionalism.

=== Sociological institutionalism ===
Sociological institutionalism is a form of new institutionalism that concerns "the way in which institutions create meaning for individuals, providing important theoretical building blocks for normative institutionalism within political science". Some sociological institutionalists argue that institutions have developed to become similar (showing an isomorphism) across organizations even though they evolved in different ways. Institutions are therefore seen as important in cementing and propagating cultural norms. Sociological institutionalists also emphasize how the functions and structures of organizations do not necessarily reflect functional purposes, but rather ceremonies and rituals. Actors comply with institutional rules and norms because other types of behavior are inconceivable; actors follow routines because they take a for-granted quality. However, later research within institutional theory has suggested that such pressures do not always lead to uniform outcomes. Instead, institutional pressures may be interpreted through locally salient constellations of institutional logics, producing heterogeneous organizational responses rather than simple convergence. Normative institutionalism is a sociological interpretation of institutions and holds that a "logic of appropriateness" guides the behavior of actors within an institution. It predicts that the norms and formal rules of institutions will shape the actions of those acting within them. According to James March, the logic of appropriateness means that actions are "matched to situations by means of rules organized into identities." Thus normative institutionalism views that much of the behavior of institutional actors is based on the recognized situation that the actors encounter, the identity of the actors in the situation, and the analysis by the actor of the rules that generally govern behavior for that actor in that particular situation.

=== New institutional economics ===
New institutional economics (NIE) is an economic perspective that attempts to extend economics by focusing on the institutions (that is to say the social and legal norms and rules) that underlie economic activity and with analysis beyond earlier institutional economics and neoclassical economics. It can be seen as a broadening step to include aspects excluded in neoclassical economics. It rediscovers aspects of classical political economy. Major scholars associated with the subject include Masahiko Aoki, Armen Alchian, Harold Demsetz, Steven N. S. Cheung, Avner Greif, Yoram Barzel, Claude Ménard (economist), and five Nobel laureates—Daron Acemoglu, Ronald Coase, Douglass North, Elinor Ostrom, and Oliver Williamson. A convergence of such researchers resulted in founding the Society for Institutional & Organizational Economics (formerly the International Society for New Institutional Economics) in 1997.

=== Rational choice institutionalism ===
Rational choice institutionalism is a theoretical approach to the study of institutions arguing that actors use institutions to maximize their utility. Institutions are understood to be exogenously given constraints ("rules of the game") on rational individual behavior. It employs analytical tools borrowed from neo-classical economics to explain how institutions are created, the behaviour of political actors within it, and the outcome of strategic interaction. Rational choice institutionalism draws heavily from rational choice theory but is not identical to it. Proponents argue that political actors' rational choices are constrained (called "bounded rationality"). These bounds are accepted as individuals realize their goals can be best achieved through institutions. In other words, institutions are systems of rules and inducements to behavior in which individuals attempt to maximize their own benefit.

According to Erik Voeten, rational choice scholarship on institutions can be divided between (1) rational functionalism and (2) Distributive rationalism. The former sees organizations as functional optimal solutions to collective problems, whereas the latter sees organizations as an outcome of actors' individual and collective goals. Since individual and collective goals may conflict, the latter version of RCI accepts that suboptimal institutions are likely.

=== Historical institutionalism ===
Emphasizes how timing, sequences and path dependence affect institutions, and shape social, political, economic behavior and change. Unlike functionalist theories and some rational choice approaches, historical institutionalism tends to emphasize that many outcomes are possible, small events and flukes can have large consequences, actions are hard to reverse once they take place, and that outcomes may be inefficient. A critical juncture may set in motion events that are hard to reverse, because of issues related to path dependency. Historical institutionalists tend to focus on history (longer temporal horizons) to understand why specific events happen.

=== Discursive institutionalism ===
Proponents of discursive institutionalism, such as Vivien Schmidt, emphasize how ideas and discourses affect institutional stability and change. Recent research has further examined how institutional meanings emerge through interaction in organizational settings. Studies show that actors interpret institutional pressures through locally salient constellations of institutional logics and articulate legitimacy claims through discourse, which can lead to heterogeneous organizational responses even under similar structural conditions. Structured deliberative formats, such as focus groups and participatory reflection tools, have therefore been used to make these interpretive processes visible by enabling practitioners to articulate institutional expectations, peer influences and professional norms in dialogue.

=== Constructivist institutionalism ===
Constructivist institutionalists assert that political, social, or policy discourses can perform communicative functions: actors publicly expressing ideas can lead to social change, or coordinating functions. Thus ideas and meaning provide a mechanism for multiple actors to achieve consensus on norms and values and thus create social change. This is increasingly moving beyond political science and into international relations theory and foreign policy analysis.

=== Feminist institutionalism ===
Feminist institutionalism is a new institutionalist approach which looks at "how gender norms operate within institutions and how institutional processes construct and maintain gender power dynamics".

== See also ==
- Critical juncture theory
- Institutional logic
- Institutional theory

== Bibliography and further reading ==
- Berger, Peter L.; Luckmann (1966), The Social Construction of Reality, New York: Doubleday.
- Chappell, Louise (June 2006). "Comparing political institutions: revealing the gendered 'logic of appropriateness'". Politics & Gender. 2 (2): 223–35. doi:10.1017/S1743923X06221044. S2CID 145811736.
- DiMaggio, Paul J.; Powell, Walter W. (April 1983). "The iron cage revisited: institutional isomorphism and collective rationality in organizational fields". American Sociological Review. 48 (2): 147–60. doi:10.2307/2095101. JSTOR 2095101.
- ———; Powell, Walter W., eds. (1991), The New Institutionalism in Organizational Analysis, Chicago: University of Chicago Press, pp. 1–38.
- Friedland, Roger; Alford, Robert R. (1991). Powell, Walter W.; DiMaggio, Paul J. (eds.). "Bringing Society Back In: Symbols, Practices, and Institutional Contradictions". The New Institutionalism in Organizational Analysis: 232–63.
- Jepperson, Ronald L. (1991), "Institutions, Institutional Effects, and Institutionalism", in Powell, Walter W.; DiMaggio, Paul J (eds.), The New Institutionalism in Organizational Analysis, Chicago: University of Chicago Press, pp. 143–63.
- Krücken, Georg; Drori, Gili S., eds. (2009), World Society: The Writings of John W. Meyer, Oxford: University Press, ISBN 9780199593439.
- Krücken, Georg; Mazza, Carmelo; Meyer, Renate; Walgenbach, Peter, eds. (2017), New Themes in Institutional Analysis. Topics and Issues from European Research, Cheltenham: Edward Elgar, ISBN 9781784716868.
- Lounsbury, Michael (2001). "Institutional Sources of Practice Variation: Staffing College and University Recycling Programs". Administrative Science Quarterly. 46 (1): 29–56. doi:10.2307/2667124. JSTOR 2667124. S2CID 145613530.
- ——— (April 2007). "A tale of two cities: competing logics and practice variation in the professionalizing of mutual funds". Academy of Management Journal. 50 (2): 289–307. doi:10.5465/AMJ.2007.24634436. S2CID 67820131.
- March, James G.; Olsen, Johan P. (1989). Rediscovering Institutions. The Organizational Basis of Politics. New York: The Free Press (also Italian, Japanese, Polish and Spanish (Mexico) editions).
- Meyer, Heinz-Dieter and Brian Rowan, 2006. The New Institutionalism in Education. Albany, NY: SUNY Press.
- Meyer, John W.; Rowan, Brian (1991), "Institutionalized Organizations: Formal Structure as Myth and Ceremony", in Powell, W.; DiMaggio, P. (eds.), The New Institutionalism in Organizational Analysis, Chicago, IL: University of Chicago Press.
- ———; Rowan, Brian (September 1977). "Institutionalized organizations: formal structure as myth and ceremony". American Journal of Sociology. 83 (2): 340–63. doi:10.1086/226550. JSTOR 2778293. S2CID 141398636.
- Nicita, Antonio; Vatiero, Massimiliano (July 2007). "The contract and the market: towards a broader notion of transaction?" (PDF). Studi e Note di Economia. 12 (1): 7–22. doi:10.2139/ssrn.2473437. S2CID 166964883. Archived from the original (PDF) on 2011-09-27.
- Ocasio, William (July 1997). "Towards An Attention‐Based View of The Firm". Strategic Management Journal. 18 (S1): 187–206. doi:10.1002/(sici)1097-0266(199707)18:1+<187::aid-smj936>3.3.co;2-b. ISSN 0143-2095. S2CID 221895930.
- Parto, Saeed. 2003. Economic Activity and Institutions, Economics Working Paper Archive at WUSTL.
- Powell, W.W. (2007). "The New Institutionalism". The International Encyclopedia of Organization Studies. Thousand Oaks, CA: Sage.
- Scott, Richard W. 2001. Institutions and Organizations, 2nd ed. Thousand Oaks: Sage Publications.
- ———; Ruef, M.; Mendel, P.; Caronna, C. (2000). Institutional change and healthcare organizations : from professional dominance to managed care. Chicago: University of Chicago Press. ISBN 978-0-22674309-7. OCLC 42689995.
- Thornton, Patricia H. (February 2002). "The rise of the corporation in a craft industry: conflict and conformity in institutional logics". Academy of Management Journal. 45 (1): 81–101. doi:10.2307/3069286. JSTOR 3069286.
- ——— (2004). Markets from culture : institutional logics and organizational decisions in higher education publishing. Stanford, CA: Stanford Business Books. ISBN 978-0-80474021-0. OCLC 53483582.
