= Robin Markwica =

Political scientist

Academic background
- Education: University of Freiburg; University of Cambridge (M.Phil.); University of Oxford (D.Phil./Ph.D.)

Academic work
- Discipline: Political scientist

Robin Markwica is the Founding Director of the German branch of the international science impact platform The Conversation. He is a political scientist specializing in international relations, foreign policy analysis, and political psychology.

== Education ==
After undergraduate studies in Political Science and History at the University of Freiburg and Harvard University, Markwica obtained a master's degree in Modern History from the University of Cambridge (Corpus Christi College). He then earned a D.Phil./Ph.D. in International Relations from the University of Oxford (Nuffield College).

== Career ==
Markwica was a Max Weber Postdoctoral Fellow in the Robert Schuman Centre for Advanced Studies at the European University Institute and an Alfried Krupp Junior Fellow at the Alfried Krupp Institute for Advanced Study. Subsequently, he became a Lecturer and Research Fellow at the Hertie School in Berlin and the head of the Ditchley Foundation’s Germany branch. In March 2025, he took up the position of Founding Director of the German edition of The Conversation.

== Research ==
Markwica’s research focused on international security, foreign policy, and the psychological dimensions of international politics. His first book, Emotional Choices, was published in 2018 by Oxford University Press. It introduced "emotional choice theory" (also referred to as the "logic of affect") as a third action model alongside rational choice theory and the logic of appropriateness. The theory organizes, explains, and predicts the ways in which emotions shape decision-making. It is associated with its own method for identifying emotions and tracing their influences on behavior.

== Selected publications ==
- Markwica, Robin (2018). Emotional Choices: How the Logic of Affect Shapes Coercive Diplomacy (1st ed.). Oxford University Press. ISBN 978-0-19-251311-3. OCLC 1028637637.

== Awards ==
- Robert Jervis International Security Best Book Award, American Political Science Association (APSA)
- Emotions in Politics and International Relations Book Prize, British International Studies Association (BISA)
- Christiane Rajewsky Prize, German Association for Peace and Conflict Studies
- Rupert Riedl Prize, Club of Vienna
- Diligentia Prize for Empirical Research, Diligentia Foundation for Empirical Research
