= Political opposition within the European Union =

Opposition is a fundamental element of democracy. Without the right to challenge and criticise ones government, its policies and its actions, democracy cannot develop. Political opposition, "when B is opposed to the conduct of government A", can include opposition from parties not in government, as well as actors other than political parties.

The European Union (EU) has been characterised as lacking in a traditional government-opposition divide. This deficiency plays into the wider question of the EU's democratic legitimacy. Scholars have argued that due to the lack of legitimate avenues to voice "issue-orientated, policy-motivated" opposition within the EU, actors voice their oppositions against the EU as a whole.

The EU tends towards a consensus-driven model of decision-making. This can be explained by the need to accommodate a wide grouping of diverse interests, cultures and traditions into one system of government. The centrality of consensus to EU decision-making, and the lack of avenues of political opposition within the EU legislative process, is inherent in the institutional structures and cultures of the European Parliament, the Council of the EU and the European Commission.

== Theorising political opposition ==
Political opposition has been theorised as one of the central elements to a functioning of democracy. Mair outlined three forms of opposition within party politics:

- Classic opposition: politicians not in the ruling party act as opposition, offering alternative policy proposals whilst still acknowledging the legitimacy of the government to govern.
- Opposition of principle: opposition not only towards the government and its policies, but also towards the legitimacy of the government overall.
- Elimination of opposition: a "surplus of consensus" results in a lack of meaningful differences between political parties. This has also been called "government by cartel".

These three forms of party-based opposition are interconnected. The extent to which classic opposition is presents has an impact on the degree of opposition in principle that exists. Furthermore, if there is classical opposition, government by cartel is not possible. Yet, if political actors cannot engage in classical opposition, two outcomes are possible. Oppositional actors either submit entirely and government by cartel occurs, or "revolt", rejecting the legitimacy of the government as a whole.

Brack has criticised the binary division of between ‘pro’/’anti’-system opposition, given the risk that this can lead to ‘normativity’ and ‘relativism’. Dahl similarly warned about this characterisation, noting that "if all opposition are treated as dangerous and subject to repression, opposition that would be loyal if it were tolerated becomes disloyal because it is not tolerated". Rather than an actor being considered as ‘objectively anti-system’, researchers should consider the way in which certain parties are characterised by others in the system, for example whether they are considered outsiders or "acceptable allies".

=== Theorising political opposition within the European Union ===
Political opposition within the EU has been described as "paradoxical". The EU, as a polity, has been characterised as "fiercely opposed". Since the Maastricht Treaty, there has been widespread public opposition to further European integration, known as a "constraining dissensus". The increasing salience of European issues in national politics and the frequency of referendums on European issues called by national governments correlated with a decline in public support for European integration. The United Kingdom's public's vote to leave the EU exemplifies the widespread public rejection of the EU polity.

Conversely, within the political system of the EU, opposition is lacking to the extent that it has been described as a "polity without politics". Between the Parliament, the council and the commission, it has been argued that there is a lack of "institutionalised site" to accommodate the "formulation and contestation of the agenda and policy choices". Classic opposition within the institutions is largely subsumed by a wider culture of consensus. To the greatest extent possible, the depoliticisation of issues enables representatives from 28 diverse member states to reconcile their varying interests and arrive at a common agreement.

==== Opposition deficit theory ====
Mair characterises the EU as lacking classical opposition, what little opposition that is expressed is deemed as ineffective. This has been referred to, in later academic work, as the ‘opposition deficit thesis’. As there is a lack of classical opposition within the political system, those that are dissatisfied use their voice against the system as a whole, thus undermining the EU's legitimacy as a polity, Mair states "once we cannot organise opposition in the EU, we are then forced to organise opposition to the EU."

Due to the lack of quasi-official ‘opposition’, citizens "cannot distinguish between opposition to the current EU policy regime and opposition to the EU system as a whole". Thus, a lack of opposition within the EU policy-making process has been connected to the rise of euro-scepticism.

===== Critique of opposition deficit theory =====
Certain scholars have argued that opposition to policies does indeed exist within EU politics. A study of European parties' manifestos during the European Parliamentary elections showed meaningful engagement with policy proposals from political actors at EU-level. At member state level, empirical research on statements in the European Affairs Committee of the Swedish Parliament evidenced that there is considerably more policy opposition, rather than simply polity opposition, than previously assumed.

== Political opposition within the European Union institutions ==
The following sections analyse the institutional and cultural factors within the European Parliament (EP), the Council of the EU and the European Commission that influence political opposition.

=== The European Parliament ===
National parliaments are generally considered to be the central arena for opposition in politics, as the traditional site of the minority-majority divide. However, the European Parliament has been classified as a "non-conflictual and non-political institution" where the form of adversarial politics characteristic of national parliaments is less visible. Several explanations for this can be deduced from the literature.

==== Treaty-based majority requirements ====
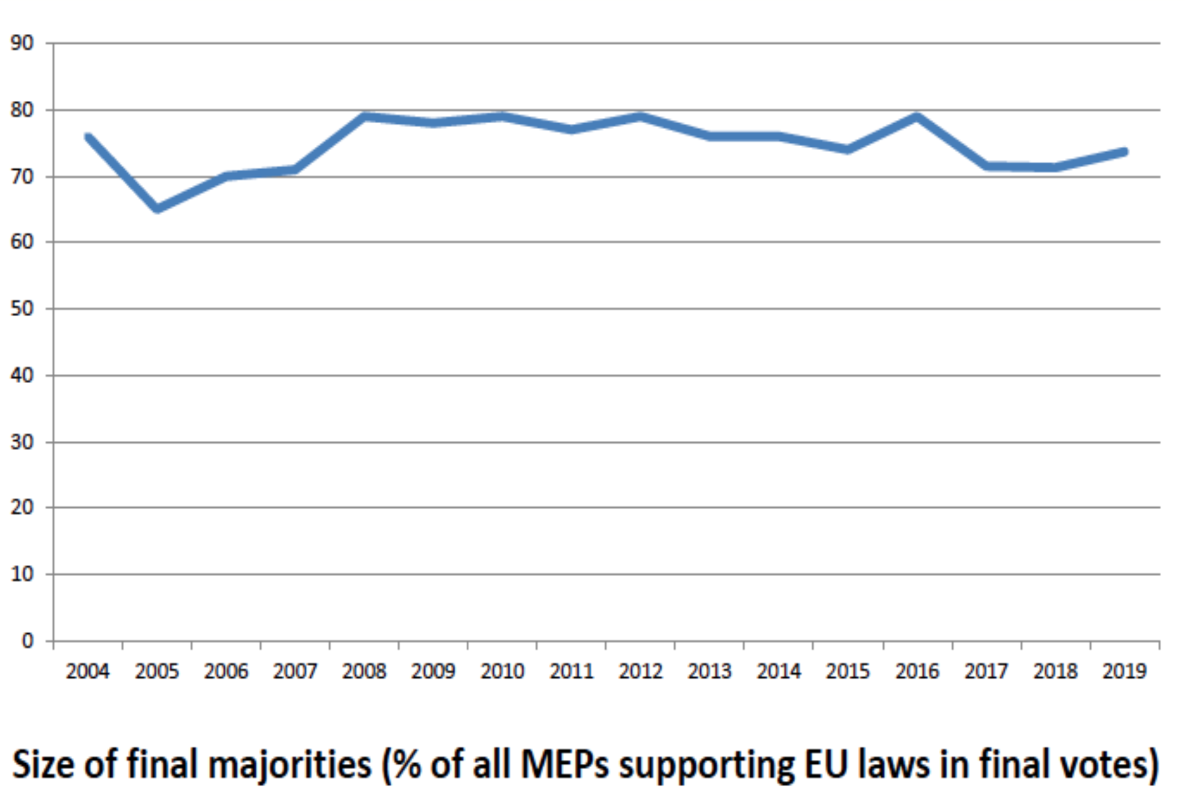
Size of final majorities (% of all MEPs supporting EU laws in final votes)

Majority requirements have enhanced the consensus driven nature of the Parliaments decision-making process whereby a high-level of proposals are adopted by broad majority. The gradual development in the Parliament's legislative competency were coupled with treaty-based majority requirements. The case of the Single European Act 1986 exemplifies this trend, the Parliament was granted legislative powers but "these were counter-balanced by absolute majority requirements".

==== Bi-cameral legislative process ====
The bi-cameral nature of the EU's legislative process has led the political groups within the Parliament to impose majority requirements upon themselves. MEPs seek to build the largest possible majorities to strengthen the Parliament's position in inter-institutional bargaining vis-à-vis the council. The ambition to appear as a credible co-legislator has been shown to result in Parliamentary committees’ willingness to set aside their more progressive standards in inter-institutional negotiations. Furthermore, a ‘rationalisation’ process undertaken within the EP with the aim of improving its organisational efficiency has led to reforms that enhanced the influence of the largest political groups while significantly decreasing the role of the individual MEPs. The rights of non-attached MEPs have been particularly minimised. The process has been criticised as "democracy through Parliament, rather than democracy in Parliament".

Finally, the bicameral nature of the system biases policy outcomes towards the centre right, undermining the effectiveness of certain parties’ policy oppositions. Even where MEPs manage to build a left-wing majority, "amendments proposed by the liberals and the EPP had a better chance of survival than those of the Greens and GUE/NGL."

==== Individual level MEP concerns ====
At an individual level, MEPs also have incentives to push for consensus. In the absence of legislative proposals that directly affect their constituents, ensuring the "efficiency of the institution as a whole is a better artefact to show voters they are doing their job." Additionally, institutional resources, such as rapporteurship, are linked to reputation. Thus, to the extent that promoting consensus correlates with gaining responsibility, MEPs seek to enhance their credibility as a compromise-builder with an ability to consolidate opinions.

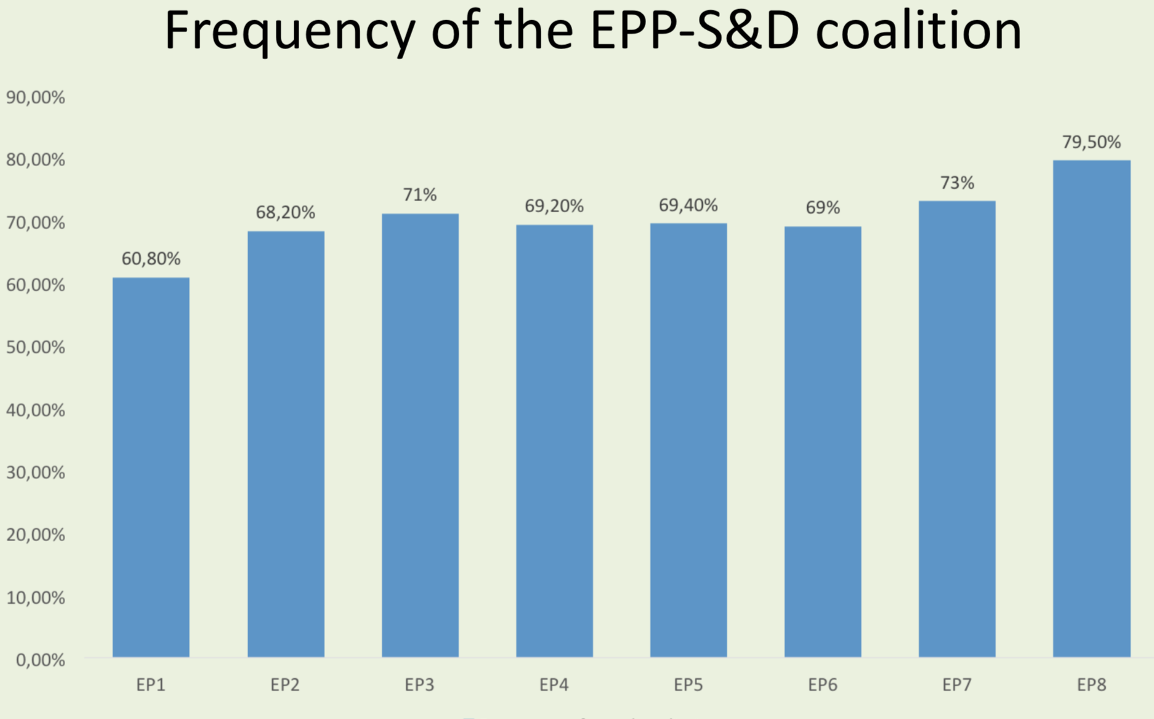
Frequency of grand coalitions (EPP and S&D)

==== Grand coalitions and the exclusion of opposition voices ====
Given the size and variety of the European electorate, no one party has ever come close to winning a majority on its own. Thus, the traditional majority-minority frame for political opposition analysis within the Parliament does not easily apply. Forming a coalition of some form has always been considered necessary.

Originally coalitions formed between the two largest centrist party groups, European People's Party (EPP) and Socialists & Democrats (S&D), referred to as 'grand coalitions'. The rise of euro-critical parties within the Parliament has obliged the EPP and S&D to broaden their coalitions to include other centrist parties in order to enhance their majorities. EPP, S&D and ALDE regularly form coalitions, referred to as a ‘grand coalition +’ Through grand coalitions, political parties are setting aside their ideological differences to prioritise the "collective performance of the assembly". This process can be classified under Mair's third criteria of political opposition, ‘government by cartel’.

The formulation of large centrist majorities inhibits the expression of political opposition within the Parliament, primarily as a result of the Cordon Sanitaire. This term refers to the "longstanding strategy" of excluding euro-critical voices from influencing decision-making in the Parliament. The cordon sanitaire strategy vis-à-vis Eurosceptic parties has resulted in such party groups being "denied access to important positions such as committee chairs and vice-chairs." They have "essentially been excluded from legislative work in the European Parliament." In 2015, the EPP and S&D party broke with the tradition of proportional distribution of positions within the assembly in order to ensure that the newly formed Europe of Nations and Freedom would be deprived of official positions.

Taking Mair's thesis, it could be argued that the failure to provide avenues for euro-critical parties to voice their views within the system has mobilised Euroscepticism, opposition against the system as a whole.

==== Presence of Eurosceptic MEPs within the Parliament ====
As support for Eurosceptic parties has risen, the strength of grand coalitions and the cordon sanitaire has been increasingly called into question. The 2014-2019 legislative period demonstrated heightened polarisation, more unstable coalitions and "a blurring of the left-right divide".

It has been argued that the increased presence of Eurosceptic MEPs within the Parliament serves to enhance, rather than undermine the legitimacy of the Parliament as a democratic body. If Eurosceptic MEPs can meaningfully engage in policy-making within the Parliament, this "fosters the Parliament's representativeness and contributes to the politicization of European issues". Eurosceptic MEPs break the EU's "pro-integration consensus", and bring the "gift of plain-speaking". Their views reflect the views of a sizable proportion of European society towards European policies and further EU integration.

For this to be the case, the extent to which Eurosceptic MEPs provide a form of opposition within the Parliament must be understood. ‘Soft-eurosceptics’ such as European Conservatives and Reformists (ECR) and GUE/NGL are willing to contribute to the decision-making process. Whilst 'hard Eurosceptics' like the European Nations and Freedom (ENF) and Europe of Freedom and Direct Democracy (EFDD) prefer to disrupt the system as a whole, manifesting Mair's second form of 'opposition in principle'.

Recent studies emphasise that the cordon sanitaire has become more "an issue of tradition" than an actual mechanism for the exclusion of radical ideologies. Mainstream parties are increasingly open to working with ‘soft-eurosceptics’ such as ECR, even if their ideological positions can sometime be as radical as harder Eurosceptics such as ENF or EFDD. Furthermore, there is increasing evidence of hard Eurosceptic policy positions emanating from the centrist groups, such as the EPP, themselves – notably from MEPs from Central and Eastern Europe.

=== The Council of the European Union ===
As the second legislative arm in the EU's decision-making process, political opposition within the Council of the EU must also be examined. The Council traditionally smooths over opposition voices in the interest of fostering consensus. Consensus in the council, refers to the process whereby legislative acts are adopted without explicit voting. The following section provides an overview of factors within the institutional and cultural architecture of the Council of the EU that influence consensus decision-making.

==== Institutional factors ====
Similar to the European Parliament, the bi-cameral nature of the EU legislative process incentivises the members of the council to take decisions by consensus so as to pose a unified front vis-à-vis the Parliament in negotiations.

Although legislative deliberations take place in public, which should, in theory, constitute a visible show of opposition voices, the council's working methods are designed to facilitate the arrival of consensus behind closed doors. Working groups and the Coreper aim to reach agreement on policy decisions prior to the arrival of Ministers in the Council of the EU.

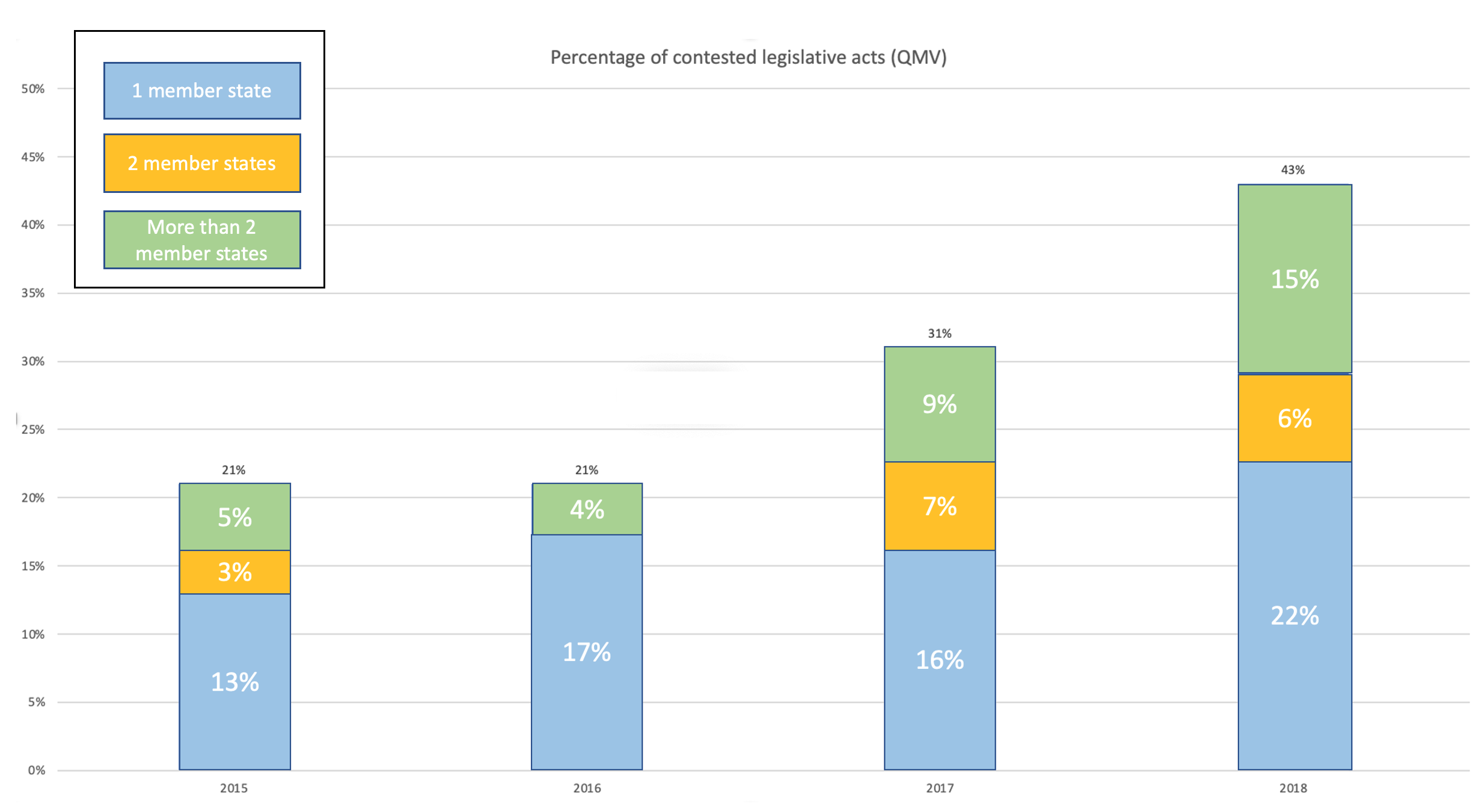
Number of acts adopted by QMV contested in the Council of the European Union between 2015 and 2017. (note: increase in contested acts between 2017 and 2018 correlates with the United Kingdom decision to exit the European Union)

==== Norm of consensus ====
The council's organisational culture, with its own informal rules, norms and traditions, is geared towards arriving at common agreement and smoothing out oppositional difficulties. Consensus is the "norm" within the Council of the EU. From a ‘sociological institutionalist’ perspective, norms are deeply rooted in actors behaviour and constrain their actions and choices. Consensus within the council has been described as a "reflex". Statistics from 1994 to 2002 show that 81% of decisions are made by consensus. Indeed, actual voting on a legislative proposal rarely takes place, as by the time the proposal has reached its final stages, before submitting it to a vote the Presidency has ensured that it has enough support so that it cannot be blocked. The risk of being perceived of as isolated is a motivating factor for member states to join the consensus. Thus, despite majority voting being possible, unanimity remained the norm within the council. Predictions that there would be an increased need for majority voting in the Council following the ‘big bang’ enlargement and the inclusion of more homogeneous preferences did not materialised.

==== Tactics ====
Member states decide whether to support consensus based on the perceived cost and benefits of opposing an agreement. Various tactics are employed that impact on such a cost-benefit analysis. The Presidency of the Council plays a key role in furthering consensus decision-making, employing tactics such as the announcement that a political agreement has been reached in order "to push pivotal player to get behind the proposal", or encouraging opponents to "speak up" so as to increase the cost of "explicit opposition". As noted, by the time a proposal is submitted for a vote, the Presidency is generally confident that there is at least a qualified majority in support of the position. Thus, even if governments have expressed dissent, they may be unwilling to block the proposal as they would incur the "costs" of public defeat in front of the press and their constituencies. Even where it appears that there is consensus regarding the outcome of a vote, empirical evidence has shown that qualified majority voting (QMV) takes place behind closed doors during the course of Council negotiations.

Member state employ tactics within Council negotiations that facilitate consensus. For example, logrolling and issue linkage tactics are used to avoid being outvoted. Member states are willing to support peers in areas that are not strategic for them, but in return, expect cooperative behaviour to be reciprocated when addressing the issues that concern them. Such tactics minimise opposition and generate larger majorities across a wide variety of policy areas.

==== Influence of national politics ====
Governments tightly controlled by national parliaments are most likely to express dissent. Particularly where Parliaments have formal powers to exercise control and are motivated by Euroscepticism. In the post-Lisbon period, an analysis of voting behaviour in the Justice and Home Affairs Council demonstrated an observable rise in opposition voting and abstentions from 2004 to 2016. Reasons for opposition included sovereignty concerns, critiques on the functionality of the proposal, a misfit with national rules and unwanted budgetary impacts of the proposal.

Nevertheless, even amongst the most Eurosceptic governments, e.g. Hungary and Poland, opposition within the council is less than expected. Between 2018 and 2019, Hungary contested 8.5% of adopted acts, Poland contested 6%. Whilst such rates of opposition were the highest in the council (followed by the UK, the Czech Republic, Germany and Slovakia), "they remain limited considering the diplomatic tensions between those two member states and EU institutions."

The EU has endured several crises over the past decade. Nevertheless, greater political and social divisions between players in the council, the rise of the Visegrad 4, and increasingly vocal Euroscepticism in domestic politics, have not translated into coordinated political opposition within the council. Levels of consensus remain persistently high.

=== The European Commission ===
Given that specific legal provisions are in place to minimise the politicisation of Commissioners, the extent to which political opposition can be seen within the commission is more limited.

==== Legal principles inhibiting political opposition ====
Voting in the commission operates based on a system of collegiality, every member of the commission is equally responsible for the adoption of all decisions. This is a core legal principle of the commission's internal decision-making, it reinforces the independence of Commissioners from their national governments. The consensus driven model of decision-making within the commission has led to the process being described of as a "black box".

==== Different perspectives amongst the College of Commissioners ====
Whilst the College of Commissioners is a unitary decision-making body, instances of opposition within the college have been documented. Examples include a rift between EU Finance commissioner Pierre Moscovici and then Commission President Jean Claude Juncker over Commissioner Moscovici's decision that Spain's draft budget did not comply with the commission's demand. Clashes between Commissioners from smaller states and larger states over the promotion of national interests have also been documented. However, Smith notes that in their relations with the media, Commissioners seek to minimise the instances that internal conflicts leak into the public sphere.

The formation of Commissioners' preference has been studied in the literature. Whilst "bureaucratic conceptualisations" of the commission would presume all Commission officials are ‘pro-integration’ actors driven by the goal of maximising their competences, this fails to account for other interests at play. Studies have argued that Commissioners defend a number of preferences, including sectoral, national and political interests within the college. The interests championed can depend on the type of policy under discussion as well as a range of factors including "organizational structure, demography, locus and culture". To an extent, conflict and political opposition over policy decisions does take place amongst Commissioners.
