= John F. Padgett =

American political scientist and sociologist

- Born: John F. Padgett; 1948 (age 77–78); Waldorf, Maryland, U.S.
- Known for: Robust action theory Research on Renaissance Florence; Autocatalytic theory of organizations
- Awards: James Barr Prize; Simmel Career Achievement Award

Academic background
- Education: Princeton University (B.A., 1971); University of Michigan (Ph.D., 1978)
- Thesis: (1978)
- Academic advisors: Pat Crecine; Robert Axelrod; Michael Cohen
- Influences: Harrison White; Herbert A. Simon

Academic work
- Discipline: Political science Sociology
- Sub-discipline: Social network analysis
- Institutions: University of Chicago; Harvard University; Santa Fe Institute
- Notable students: Christopher Ansell; Bruce Carruthers
- Website: home.uchicago.edu/~jpadgett/

John F. Padgett (born 1948) is an American political scientist and sociologist who is Professor of Political Science at the University of Chicago. He is known for interdisciplinary work on organizational emergence, social networks, and the co-evolution of states and markets. His research on Renaissance Florence includes extensive archival work and his development of autocatalytic theories of organizational genesis.

== Early life and education ==
Padgett was born and raised in Waldorf, Maryland, a rural tobacco farming community in Southern Maryland. He attended St. Mary's Ryken High School, a Catholic parochial school, where he served as valedictorian and class president of his graduating class of 40 students in 1967. During his valedictory address, he spoke against the Vietnam War to a military audience.

Padgett initially studied electrical engineering at Princeton University, where he worked summers at the Norfolk Naval Shipyard designing sonar systems for Poseidon nuclear submarines. His opposition to the Vietnam War led him to reconsider this career path. He became involved in social service work, including positions at Camden Legal Aid, Trenton Model Cities, and New Jersey Neuro-Psychiatric Hospital, eventually becoming student president of Princeton's volunteer program.

After completing his bachelor's degree at Princeton in 1971, Padgett worked as a research aide to Mayor Art Holland of Trenton, New Jersey. He then pursued graduate studies at the University of Michigan, earning his Ph.D. in Sociology and Public Policy in 1978 under advisors Pat Crecine, Robert Axelrod, and Michael Cohen.

== Career ==
Padgett began his academic career at Harvard University in the Sociology department, recruited by Harrison White. At Harvard, he co-taught with White for four years, an experience that influenced his theoretical orientation toward structuralist and constructivist approaches to social analysis.

He joined the University of Chicago's Department of Political Science in 1981, where he has remained throughout his career. He holds courtesy appointments in the Departments of Sociology and History at Chicago and has served as a secondary appointment professor in Economics at the University of Trento in Italy.

From 1996 to 2009, Padgett was affiliated with the Santa Fe Institute, serving as an external faculty member (1996-2000, 2004-2009) and as a research professor (2000-2004). At SFI, he co-directed the "Co-evolution of States and Markets" program with Walter W. Powell from 1999 to 2009.

=== Renaissance Florence ===
For over two decades, Padgett has constructed a relational database on Renaissance Florence from primary archival sources. The database contains information on approximately 60,000 persons including over 10,000 marriages, 14,000 loans, 3,000 business partnerships, 40,000 tax records, and 12,000 political office elections spanning 1300-1500.

His 1993 article "Robust Action and the Rise of the Medici, 1400-1434" (co-authored with Christopher Ansell) in the American Journal of Sociology adapted Leifer's micro concept of robust action to politics and state formation—a leadership style characterized by strategic ambiguity that allows different audiences to interpret the same actions differently.

Padgett's analysis of Cosimo de' Medici stresses how political power emerged from multiple overlapping networks—banking, family, and patronage—rather than from deliberate strategic planning. His research demonstrates that Cosimo's banking network served as the foundation for political influence, with the Medici bank operating as a nexus for international trade and financial transactions across Europe.

=== Theory ===
Padgett's theoretical work centers on the principle that "in the short run, actors make relations, but in the long run, relations make actors." This structuralist-constructivist perspective, influenced by Harrison White, challenges methodological individualism by investigating how social structures dynamically construct and reconstruct themselves over time.

In his 2012 book with Walter W. Powell, The Emergence of Organizations and Markets, Padgett develops a theory of organizational genesis based on autocatalysis borrowed from biochemistry. The work studies how new organizational forms emerge through spillovers across multiple intertwined social networks. He distinguishes between innovation (changes within existing systems) and invention (transformations that reorganize entire networks), and argues that organizational inventions typically arise from cross-domain transpositions rather than deliberate design.

The autocatalytic framework views social systems as self-reproducing networks where components are continuously reconstructed through their interactions. This approach has been applied to analyze diverse cases ranging from Renaissance Florence to Silicon Valley biotechnology firms, from German state formation under Bismarck to economic reforms in the Soviet Union and China.

=== Federal Budgetary research ===
Early in his career, Padgett published work on federal budgetary decision-making, applying stochastic process models to analyze bureaucratic behavior. His research challenged existing theories of incrementalism and demonstrated the importance of informal judgmental evaluations in budgetary processes.

== Padgett's approach ==
Padgett's research combines historical archival methods with formal modeling and statistical analysis. His work on Renaissance Florence involves extensive computerized compilation of archival sources into relational databases, allowing for sophisticated network analysis of historical social structures. He has developed agent-based computational models to study autocatalytic processes in organizational emergence.

His approach emphasizes the study of transformational networks rather than diffusion networks, focusing on how components within systems transform each other through time. This methodology has been applied across diverse historical periods and contexts, from medieval banking systems to modern biotechnology clusters. Padgett has also established a Social Science Research Council program on History, Networks and Evolution to foster collaboration between biologists and social scientists in studying evolutionary processes in social systems.

== Awards and honors ==
- James Barr Prize from the Association of Public Policy and Management for best article in public finance by an assistant professor
- 2008 Prize for best article of the year from the Historical and Comparative Sociology section of the American Sociological Association
- Simmel Career Achievement Award for research in social networks from the International Network for Social Network Analysis
- Research grants totaling over $1 million from the National Science Foundation and Hewlett Foundation
- Visiting fellowships at the Center for Advanced Study in the Behavioral Sciences (Stanford), Villa I Tatti (Florence), European University Institute, and universities in Bologna, Lucca, and Modena

== Selected publications ==
=== Books ===
- Padgett, John F., and Walter W. Powell. The Emergence of Organizations and Markets. Princeton: Princeton University Press, 2012. ISBN 978-0-691-14867-8.
- John F. Padgett, Organizational Invention in Renaissance Florence, 2026 (forthcoming in April), Oxford University Press

=== Major Articles ===
- Padgett, John F. "Bounded Rationality in Budgetary Research." American Political Science Review 74, no. 2 (1980): 354-372.
- Padgett, John F. "Hierarchy and Ecological Control in Federal Budgetary Decision Making." American Journal of Sociology 87, no. 1 (1981): 75-129.
- Padgett, John F. "Plea Bargaining and Prohibition in the Federal Courts, 1908-1934." Law and Society Review 24, no. 2 (1990): 413-450.
- Padgett, John F., and Christopher K. Ansell. "Robust Action and the Rise of the Medici, 1400-1434." American Journal of Sociology 98, no. 6 (1993): 1259-1319.
- McLean, Paul D., and John F. Padgett. "Was Florence a Perfectly Competitive Market? Transactional Evidence from the Renaissance." Theory and Society 26, no. 2 (1997): 209-244.
- Padgett, John F., Doowan Lee, and Nick Collier. "Economic Production as Chemistry." Industrial and Corporate Change 12, no. 4 (2003): 843-877.
- Padgett, John F., and Paul D. McLean. "Organizational Invention and Elite Transformation: The Birth of Partnership Systems in Renaissance Florence." American Journal of Sociology 111, no. 5 (2006): 1463-1568.
- Padgett, John F. "Open Elite? Social Mobility, Marriage, and Family in Florence, 1282-1494." Renaissance Quarterly 63, no. 2 (2010): 357-411.
- Padgett, John F., and Paul D. McLean. "Economic Credit in Renaissance Florence." Journal of Modern History 83, no. 1 (2011): 1-47.
- Padgett, John F. "Causality in Political Networks." American Politics Research 39, no. 2 (2011): 437-480.
