= Logic of appropriateness =

Theoretical perspective explaining human decision-making

The logic of appropriateness is a theoretical perspective to explain human decision-making. It proposes that decisions and behavior follow from rules of appropriate behavior for a given role or identity. These rules are institutionalized in social practices and sustained over time through learning. People adhere to them because they see them as natural, rightful, expected, and legitimate. In other words, the logic of appropriateness assumes that actors decide on the basis of what social norms deem right rather than what cost-benefit calculations suggest best. The term was coined by organization theorists James G. March and Johan Olsen. They presented the argument in two prominent articles published by the journals Governance in 1996 and International Organization in 1998.

== Overview ==
According to James G. March and Johan Olsen, the core intuition of the logic of appropriateness is that humans maintain a repertoire of roles and identities, which provide rules of appropriate behavior in situations for which they are relevant. Following these rules is a relatively complex cognitive process involving thoughtful, reasoning behavior. Such a process of reasoning is not connected to the anticipation of costs and benefits, as rational choice theory would suggest. Rather, the assumption is that actors will generally try to answer three elementary questions: (1) What kind of a situation is this?; (2) Who am I?; and (3) How appropriate are different actions for me in this situation? Then they will often do what they regard as most appropriate. Put differently, actors typically follow "internalized prescriptions of what is socially defined as normal, true, right, or good, without, or in spite of calculation of consequences and expected utility."

March and Olsen recognize that the term "logic of appropriateness" has overtones of morality, but they emphasize that rules of appropriateness may underlie atrocities of action, such as ethnic cleansing and blood feuds, as well as moral heroism. The fact that a rule of action is defined as appropriate by an individual or a collectivity may reflect learning of some sort from history, but it does not guarantee moral acceptability, they explain.

== The logic of appropriateness and the logic of consequences ==
March and Olsen distinguish the logic of appropriateness from what they term the "logic of consequences," more commonly known as rational choice theory. The logic of consequences is based on the assumption that actors have fixed preferences, will make cost-benefit calculations, and choose among different options by evaluating the likely consequences for their objectives. According to this rational choice perspective, rules, norms, and identities do not play any significant role in shaping human behavior.

Joerg Balsiger suggests that the logics of appropriateness and consequences have distinct political implications. The logic of appropriateness assumes that actors follow rules because they are perceived as natural, valid, and legitimate. Rules may be replaced or modified over time through processes of selection and adaptation. This outlook emphasizes the notion of political community and its definition of accepted social relations. In contrast, the logic of consequences stresses individual interests and treats political order as an aggregation of rational actor preferences through processes of bargaining, negotiation, and coalition formation.

The two logics are often presented in mutually exclusive terms. March and Olsen, however, argue that human decision-making "generally cannot be explained exclusively in terms of a logic of either consequences or appropriateness." They recognize that actors are motivated by both the "logic of consequences" and the "logic of appropriateness." Hence, they suggest exploring them as complementary, rather than assuming a single dominant behavioral logic. This makes it possible to examine the logics' variations, shifting significance, scope conditions, prerequisites, and interplay. Analysts can investigate empirically which logic plays a greater role in any given situation. They can also explore under what conditions and how each logic is invoked, lost, and redefined. Finally, they may examine how the logics interact and under which circumstances each logic may become dominant.

Joerg Balsiger suggests that the two logics can also be understood as opposite poles of a single continuum. In the face of uncertainty, the analysis of a specific situation may yield a variety of appropriate alternatives. The choice among these may then involve an assessment of the likelihood of different consequences with regard to the costs and benefits of expected outcomes.

== Inferring rules of appropriateness ==
According to March and Olsen, rules prescribe what is appropriate action. They store information about social and institutional norms and practices that inform actors what to do in a specific situation. They contain a repertoire of appropriate actions fitted to a situation by an actor. And they tell actors where to look for precedents and who the authoritative interpreters of different rules are. Actors then take decisions on the basis of their interpretation of a situation, their identities, and the associated rules.

March and Olsen also point out that the clarity of rules cannot be taken as given, however. Rather, rules may be unspecific, ambiguous, or contested. Inferring and identifying them may require time and energy. Furthermore, individuals have multiple roles and identities that are, in turn, associated with a variety of alternative rules. At times, these rules may compete or collide with each other. Actors may then challenge and disobey some rules because they adhere to other rules. March and Olsen stress that while rules guide behavior and make some actions more likely than others, they ordinarily do not determine decision-making or policy outcomes precisely. Rather, rules provide broad parameters for action, and sometimes actors show considerable ability to accommodate shifting circumstances by changing behavior without changing core rules. In order to understand the impact of rules on action, analysts thus need to examine processes like learning, socialization, diffusion, regeneration, deliberate design, and competitive selection. They also need to take into account how institutions distribute resources and enable actors to follow rules.

== Applications ==
In his otherwise very critical review, Kjell Goldmann acknowledges that James G. March and Johan Olsen's logic of appropriateness has "inspired scholars in fields ranging from public administration to international relations." The perspective's "influence has been strong and positive in the research community," he notes.

In the field of International Relations, for example, numerous scholars, especially proponents of constructivist approaches, have employed the logic of appropriateness as their action-theoretical foundation. For instance, some analysts have explored how international organizations like the World Bank or UNESCO have sought to set standards of appropriateness and to diffuse these international norms. They have found that these institutions can play an important role in mobilizing various group socialization processes to shape states' behavior. Other scholars have suggested that the Chinese government, for example, has changed important aspects of its behavior as a result of socialization in the context of international organizations.

Yet other experts have found that international institutions can facilitate a gradual transformation of the logic of consequences into a logic of appropriateness. Initially, the discourse about whether to join an international agreement, for example, may still be driven by rational choice thinking. Government officials would then ask whether this would be in their country's interest. As norms strengthen, however, states presumably begin to frame behavior contradicting institutional obligations in norm-based rather than interest-based terms. Accounting for actions in normative terms may then become self-reinforcing: By framing its decisions in normative terms, a government strengthens the expectation of other countries and of its own citizens that it will not later reverse those actions based on changes in interests.

== Critiques ==
Some scholars have critiqued James G. March and Johan Olsen's conceptualization of the logic of appropriateness.

For example, Ole Jacob Sending argues that the logic of appropriateness has a structural bias both regarding the understanding and the explanation of individual action. As such, he concludes, "it is untenable as a theory of individual action."

Kjell Goldmann criticizes that "it is difficult to determine what kind of constructs the so-called logics are – whether they are to be seen as perspectives, theories, or ideal types." He also charges that the logics of appropriateness and consequences overlap considerably, which, in his eyes, makes their "analytic utility [...] debatable." Moreover, he finds that March and Olsen "do not adequately distinguish between the actions of individuals and collectivities." In his opinion, "it is not obvious whether they expect us to study individuals or organizations in search of the logic of political action." This is important, however, "because one logic may predominate at the level of individuals within an organization and another logic at the level of the organization itself."

Robin Markwica critiques that the logic of appropriateness neglects the emotional underpinnings of normative motivation. March and Olsen acknowledge that human decision-making may be driven by emotion. Yet, their conceptualization of the logic of appropriateness disregards the role of emotion and focuses solely on its "cognitive and normative components." They treat rule-following as a "cognitive process involving thoughtful, reasoning behavior." Drawing on research in neuroscience and psychology, Markwica points out that emotion plays a key role in normative action. Emotions endow norms and identities with meaning. If people feel strongly about norms, they are particularly likely to adhere to them. Rules that cease to resonate at an affective level, however, often come to lose their prescriptive power. He notes that recent findings in neurology suggest that humans generally feel before they think. So emotions may lead them to prioritize the logic of appropriateness over the logic of consequences, or vice versa. Emotions may also infuse the logic of appropriateness and inform actors how to adjudicate between different norms. Given that the logic of appropriateness has difficulties accounting for the role of affect and emotion in decision-making, the "logic of affect" or emotional choice theory has been proposed as an alternative logic of choice.

== See also ==
- Emotional choice theory
- Logic of affect
- New institutionalism
- Rational choice theory
- Constructivism (international relations)
