= Isomorphism (sociology) =

Similarity between organizations

In sociology, an isomorphism is a similarity of the processes or structure of one organization to those of another, be it the result of imitation or independent development under similar constraints. The concept of institutional isomorphism was primarily developed by Paul DiMaggio and Walter Powell. The concept appears in their 1983 paper The iron cage revisited: institutional isomorphism and collective rationality in organizational fields. The term is borrowed from the mathematical concept of isomorphism.

== Globalization ==
In the context of globalization, isomorphism describes how contemporary national societies become more similar through the institutionalization of global cultural and associational processes. Isomorphism across nation-states is also seen in policy convergence, for example in the European Union where states are driven by structural pressures such as directives, regulations, cohesion funds, and collaboration mechanisms to harmonize policies. This is in contrast to theories of policy transfer or diffusion, which generally give more agency to states in adopting policies.

Through isomorphism, diverse nation-states around the world may adopt similar practices, such as mass schooling systems organized around a fairly standard curriculum, antinatalist population control policies intended to enhance national development, formally equalized women's rights, expanded human rights in general, expansive environmental policies, development-oriented economic policy, universalistic welfare systems, standard definitions of disease and health care, and even some basic demographic variables. Researchers explain these isomorphisms as sensible outcomes of nation-states being enactments of the world cultural order, with similarities arising despite differences among national economies and cultural traditions.

== Types of institutional isomorphism ==
There are three main types of institutional isomorphism: normative, coercive and mimetic. The development that these three types of isomorphism can also create isomorphic paradoxes that hinder such development. Specifically, these isomorphic paradoxes are related to an organization's remit, resources, accountability, and professionalization.

=== Normative isomorphic change ===
Normative isomorphic change is driven by pressures brought about by professions. One mode is the legitimization inherent in the licensing and crediting of educational achievement. The other is the inter-organizational networks that span organizations. Norms developed during education are entered into organizations. Inter-hiring between existing industrial firms also encourages isomorphism. People from the same educational backgrounds will approach problems in much the same way. Socialization on the job reinforces these conformities.

=== Coercive isomorphic change ===
Coercive isomorphic change involves pressures on an organization from other organizations upon which they are dependent. Coercion may also come from pressures of cultural expectations. Coercion may come from governmental mandates, contract law, or financial reporting requirements. DiMaggio and Powell write that organizations are increasingly homogeneous within given domains and increasingly organized around rituals of conformity to wider institutions". This concept can be seen in political organizations, and in the impacts of large corporations on their subsidiaries.

=== Mimetic isomorphism ===
Mimetic isomorphism in organization theory refers to the tendency of an organization to imitate another organization's structure because of the belief that the structure of the latter organization is beneficial. This behavior happens primarily when an organization's goals or means of achieving these goals is unclear. In this case, mimicking another organization perceived as legitimate becomes a "safe" way to proceed. An example is a struggling regional university hiring a star faculty member in order to be perceived as more similar to organizations that are revered (e.g., an Ivy League institution). The term has been applied by companies such as McKinsey & Co as part of their recommendations to companies undergoing restructuring or other organizational transformations.

== See also ==
- New institutionalism
