= Emotional choice theory =

Emotional choice theory (also referred to as the "logic of affect") is a social scientific action model to explain human decision-making. Its foundation was laid in Robin Markwica’s monograph Emotional Choices published by Oxford University Press in 2018. It is associated with its own method for identifying emotions and tracing their influences on decision-making. Emotional choice theory is considered an alternative model to rational choice theory and constructivist perspectives.

== Overview ==
Markwica suggests that political and social scientists have generally employed two main action models to explain human decision-making: On the one hand, rational choice theory (also referred to as the "logic of consequences") views people as homo economicus and assumes that they make decisions to maximize benefit and to minimize cost. On the other hand, a constructivist perspective (also known as the "logic of appropriateness") regards people as homo sociologicus, who behave according to their social norms and identities. According to Markwica, recent research in neuroscience and psychology, however, shows that decision-making can be strongly influenced by emotion. Drawing on these insights, he develops "emotional choice theory," which conceptualizes decision-makers as homo emotionalis – "emotional, social, and physiological beings whose emotions connect them to, and separate them from, significant others."

Emotional choice theory posits that individual-level decision-making is shaped in significant ways by the interplay between people’s norms, emotions, and identities. While norms and identities are important long-term factors in the decision process, emotions function as short-term, essential motivators for change. These motivators kick in when persons detect events in the environment that they deem relevant to a need, goal, value, or concern.

== The role of emotions in decision-making ==
Markwica contends that rational choice theory and constructivist approaches generally ignore the role of affect and emotion in decision-making. They typically treat choice selection as a conscious and reflective process based on thoughts and beliefs. Two decades of research in neuroscience, however, suggest that only a small fraction of the brain’s activities operate at the level of conscious reflection. The vast majority of its activities consist of unconscious appraisals and emotion. Markwica concludes that emotions play a significant role in shaping decision-making processes: "They inform us what we like and what we loathe, what is good and bad for us, and whether we do right or wrong. They give meaning to our relationships with others, and they generate physiological impulses to act."

== The theory ==
Emotional choice theory is a unitary action model to organize, explain, and predict the ways in which emotions shape decision-making. One of its main assumptions is that the role of emotion in choice selection can be captured systematically by homo emotionalis. The theory seeks to lay the foundation for an affective paradigm in the political and social sciences. Markwica emphasizes that it is not designed to replace rational choice theory and constructivist approaches, or to negate their value. Rather, it is supposed to offer a useful complement to these perspectives. Its purpose is to enable scholars to explain a broader spectrum of decision-making.

The theory is developed in four main steps: The first part defines "emotion" and specifies the model’s main assumptions. The second part outlines how culture shapes emotions, while the third part delineates how emotions influence decision-making. The fourth part formulates the theory’s main propositions.

=== Defining "emotion" and the theory’s main assumptions ===
Emotional choice theory subscribes to a definition of "emotion" as a "transient, partly biologically based, partly culturally conditioned response to a stimulus, which gives rise to a coordinated process including appraisals, feelings, bodily reactions, and expressive behavior, all of which prepare individuals to deal with the stimulus."

Markwica notes that the term "emotional choice theory" and the way it contrasts with rational choice theory may create the impression that it casts emotion in opposition to rationality. However, he stresses that the model does not conceive of feeling and thinking as antithetical processes. Rather, it seeks to challenge rational choice theory’s monopoly over the notion of rationality. He argues that the rational choice understanding of rationality is problematic not for what it includes, but for what it omits. It allegedly leaves out important affective capacities that put humans in a position to make reasoned decisions. He points out that two decades of research in neuroscience and psychology has shattered the orthodox view that emotions stand in opposition to rationality. This line of work suggests that the capacity to feel is a prerequisite for reasoned judgment and rational behavior.

=== The influence of culture on emotions ===
Emotional choice theory is based on the assumption that while emotion is felt by individuals, it cannot be isolated from the social context in which it arises. It is inextricably intertwined with people’s cultural ideas and practices. This is why it is necessary to understand how emotion is molded by the cultural environment in which it is embedded. The theory draws on insights from sociology to delineate how actors’ norms about the appropriate experience and expression of affect shape their emotions. It does not specify the precise substantive content of norms in advance. Given that they vary from case to case, Markwica suggests that they need to be investigated inductively. The model describes the generic processes through which norms guide emotions: Norms affect emotions through what sociologist Arlie Russell Hochschild has termed "feeling rules," which inform people how to experience emotions in a given situation, and "display rules," which tell them how to express emotions.

=== The influence of emotions on decision-making ===
Emotional choice theory assumes that emotions are not only social but also corporeal experiences that are tied to an organism’s autonomic nervous system. People feel emotions physically, often before they are aware of them. It is suggested that these physiological processes can exert a profound influence on human cognition and behavior. They generate or stifle energy, which makes decision-making a continuously dynamic phenomenon. To capture this physiological dimension of emotions, the theory draws on research in psychology in general and appraisal theory in particular. Appraisal theorists have found that each discrete emotion, such as fear, anger, or sadness, has a logic of its own. It is associated with what social psychologist Jennifer Lerner has termed "appraisal tendencies" and what emotion researcher Nico Frijda has called "action tendencies." An emotion’s appraisal tendencies influence what and how people think, while its action tendencies shape what they want and do.

=== Emotional choice theory’s propositions ===
The core of emotional choice theory consists of a series of propositions about how emotions tend to influence decision-makers’ thinking and behavior through their appraisal tendencies and action tendencies: Fear often prompts an attentional bias toward potential threats and may cause actors to fight, flee, or freeze. Anger is associated with a sense of power and a bias in favor of high-risk options. Hope may boost creativity and persistence, but it can also further confirmation bias. Pride can both cause people to be more persistent and to disregard their own weaknesses. And humiliation can lead people to withdraw or, alternatively, to resist the humiliator.

Markwica emphasizes that even when emotions produce powerful impulses, individuals will not necessarily act on them. Emotional choice theory restricts itself to explaining and predicting the influence of emotions on decision-making in a probabilistic fashion. It also recognizes that emotions may mix, meld, or co-occur.

== Method for identifying emotions and tracing their influences on decision-making ==
Emotional choice theory is associated with a method for identifying actors’ emotions and gauging their influences on decision-making. The idea is to infer the traces that emotions leave behind in their external representations, such as physiological manifestations or verbal utterances. To begin with, the method develops a taxonomy of emotion signs that includes four categories: explicit, implicit, cognitive, and behavioral emotion signs. It then employs a combination of qualitative sentiment analysis and an interpretive approach to identify these emotion signs in self-reports (e.g., autobiographies or statements in interviews) and observer reports (e.g., eyewitness accounts). Sentiment analysis is a technique for uncovering emotion terms in texts, i.e., written words that were originally noted down by an author or expressed by a speaker. While finding explicit emotion signs is helpful, an interpretive approach is best suited to identify implicit, cognitive, and behavioral signs of emotions.

Markwica claims that neither traditional causal analysis nor constitutive analysis can properly account for the relationship between emotions and decision-making. Causal analysis, which conceptualizes cause and effect as two independent, stable entities, has difficulty grasping the continuously fluent nature of emotions. Constitutive analysis, on the other hand, fails to capture the dynamic character of emotions, because it assumes a static relationship between properties and their component parts. This is why emotional choice theory relies on "process analysis" as an alternative. Drawing on process philosophy, the theory conceives of emotions not as "objects" or "states" but as continuous processes "all the way down." In contrast to constitution, the concept of process includes an ineliminable temporal dimension. Whereas causal analysis is based on the assumption that an independent variable causes an effect, a process approach suggests that entities connected in a process do not exist separately from each other.

Finally, emotional choice theory adapts the classic causal process tracing method to this process form of explanation in order to explore the relationship between emotions and decision-making. The result is an interpretive form of the process tracing technique, which seeks to bring together an interpretive sensitivity to social contexts with a commitment to gaining cross-case insights. The idea is to first establish the local meanings of emotion norms and to then move beyond singular causality to attain a higher level of analytical generality.

== Reception ==
Emotional choice theory has been met with some praise but also with strong criticisms by political and social scientists and political psychologists.

For example, political scientist Dustin Tingley (Harvard University) considers the model "an intellectual tour de force" that "should be required reading for anyone in the social sciences who is doing applied research that features a role for emotions." In his opinion, even scholars from the rational choice school of thought would "benefit from the clear explication of how to think about emotion in strategic contexts." International relations scholar Neta Crawford (Boston University) recognizes that emotional choice theory seeks to "dramatically revise, if not overturn," our understanding of decision-making. She concludes that the model is "strong [...] on theoretical, methodological, and empirical grounds." However, she criticizes its disregard for important factors that would need to be taken into consideration to fully explain decision-making. For instance, the theory’s focus on the psychology and emotions of individual actors makes it difficult to account for group dynamics in decision-making processes such as groupthink, in her opinion. She also finds that the theory neglects the role of ideology and gender, including norms about femininity and masculinity. Similarly, Matthew Costlow (National Institute of Public Policy) criticizes that the model does not adequately take into account how mental illnesses and personality disorders may influence certain emotions and people’s ability to regulate them. He notes that U.S. President Abraham Lincoln and British Prime Minister Winston Churchill suffered from depression, for example, which presumably affected their emotions and, hence, their decision-making.

Political psychologist Rose McDermott (Brown University) considers emotional choice theory "remarkable for its creative integration of many facets of emotion into a single, detailed, comprehensive framework." She deems it an "important contribution" to the literature on decision-making, which can "easily serve as a foundational template for other scholars wishing to expand exploration into other emotions or other areas of application." Yet, she also notes "how deeply idiosyncratic the experience and expression of emotion is between individuals." In her eyes, this "does not make it impossible or pointless" to apply emotional choice theory, "but it does make it more difficult, and requires more and richer information sources than other models might demand." International relations scholar Adam Lerner (University of Cambridge) wonders whether emotions and their interpretations are not too context specific – both socially and historically – for their impacts to be understood systematically across time and space with emotional choice theory. He takes issue with the model’s complexity and concludes that it offers "relatively limited yield" when compared with rigorous historical analysis.

Political scientist Ignas Kalpokas (Vytautas Magnus University) regards emotional choice theory as "a long-overdue and successful attempt to conceptualize the logic of affect." He highlights the theory’s "real subversive and disruptive potential" and considers it "of particular necessity in today’s environment when traditional political models based on rationality and deliberation are crumbling in the face of populism, resurgent emotion-based identities, and post-truth." In his eyes, the model’s most significant "drawback" is the methodological difficulty of accessing another person’s emotions. When analysts are not able to obtain this information, they cannot employ the theory.

According to international relations scholar Keren Yarhi-Milo (Columbia University), the theory "proves a useful, additional approach to understanding the decision-making process of leaders." In her view, the model and its methodology "are novel and significantly advance not only our understanding of [emotions'] role in decision-making but also how to study them systematically." She highlights the theory’s assumption that "emotions themselves are shaped by the cultural milieu in which they are embedded." Contextualizing emotions in such a way is "important," she contends, because cultures, norms, and identities are bound to vary over time and space, which will, in turn, affect how people experience and express emotions. At the same time, Yarhi-Milo points out that the theory sacrifices parsimony by incorporating a number of psychological and cultural processes, such as the role of identity validation dynamics, compliance with norms about emotions, and the influence of individual psychological dispositions. She notes that the model’s focus on the inductive reconstruction of the cultural context of emotions puts a "significant burden" on analysts who apply it, because they need access to evidence that is typically not easy to come by.

== See also ==
- Constructivism (international relations)
- Decision-making models
- Logic of appropriateness
- Rational choice theory
- Social choice theory
