= Christopher Ansell =

Political scientist, academic, and author

Christopher K. Ansell
- Occupations: Political scientist, author, and academic

Academic background
- Education: B.A., Environmental Sciences; M.A., Political Science; Ph.D., Political Science
- Alma mater: University of Virginia; University of Chicago
- Academic advisor: John F. Padgett

Academic work
- Institutions: University of California, Berkeley

Christopher K. Ansell is a political scientist, academic, and author. He is a professor of Political Science at the University of California, Berkeley.

Ansell's research addresses political science, primarily focusing on governance, public administration, and comparative public policy. He is the holder of an honorary doctorate in Administration from Roskilde University and is a fellow of the National Academy of Public Administration. In 2025, he was ranked among the top 2% scientists by Stanford University.

== Education ==
Ansell completed his Bachelor's in Environmental Science from the University of Virginia in 1979. He later earned his Master's in Political Science in 1986 and his Ph.D. in Political Science in 1993, both from the University of Chicago.

== Career ==
Ansell began his career in 1979 when he started working as a research analyst in the Oceans and Environment Program for the US Congress's Office of Technology Assessment, where he worked until 1984. After completing his Ph.D. at the University of Chicago, he joined the University of California, Berkeley, initially as an assistant professor in 1993, before becoming an associate professor in 2000, and has been working as a professor of Political Science since 2011. At UC Berkeley, He was the director of the Travers Program on Ethics and Accountability in Government from 2007 to 2013 and chair of the Charles and Louise Travers Department of Political Science from 2018 to 2021.

== Research ==
Ansell's research explored collaborative governance and its applications, particularly the management of public resources and the role of dialogic processes in understanding the problems being faced, and has further proposed models of collaborative governance, particularly the contingency model which identifies conditions which lead to successful or unsuccessful collaboration. He emphasized pragmatism as a productive method in problem-solving. Along with Miura, he discussed government platforms and highlighted the role of new technologies in citizen participation. He developed the idea of co-creation as an emerging paradigm in public administration and linked collaborative governance to the innovation process within public institutions. In his later research, he has explored robust governance which combines adaptation flexibility and proactive innovation to constructively solve crisis-induced turbulence.

== Works ==
In one of his earliest works, with his dissertation advisor John F. Padgett, Ansell analyzed how the Medici family used social networks to rise to power. In other papers, he has discussed "network polity", and represented it using the example of regional development strategies in the EU.

Ansell's book Schism and Solidarity in Social Movements: the Politics of Labor in the French Third Republic, discussed the historical development of the Third Republic French labour movement and aimed to understand schism and solidarity in social movements. Christopher Johnson commented on his use of the French Labor Movement as a "laboratory" and emphasized his "contribution to organizational theory".

Ansell authored the book, Pragmatist Democracy: Evolutionary Learning as Public Philosophy, in which he proposed a new "problem-solving democracy" where the public is actively involved in solving issues of public policy. He used a pragmatist, evolutionary-learning perspective to support his view. Peyton Gooch argued that "Ansell's public philosophy of pragmatic collaborative governance represents a meaningful contribution to our understanding of institutions, the policy environment, and bureaucratic organization," while also noting that "the lion's share of his examples are drawn from policing, where the problems are well-bounded, the stakeholders are clearly defined, and the organizational structures are, at least to some extent, distinctive." Writing for the Socio-Economic Review, Gerald Berk remarked that although there are moments when the book "backtracks, rather than gains ground, in pragmatist progress," he is nevertheless "fully convinced" by the author's approach and most of his decisions. Arvind Sivaramakrishnan called the work "valuable" while critiquing its lack of clarity in "some passages."

Ansell also co-edited What's the Beef?, which analyzed food safety regulations in Europe at national, European, and international levels. According to Cori Ham, it provides a "great" and "detailed" overview of food safety challenges in the EU. Elsa Tsioumani remarked that ranging "from societal attitudes to institutional behaviour and from the national to the global level, the book provides a great overview of the plethora of issues associated with food safety regulation in Europe". In contrast, Alexia Herwig pointed out that his advocacy for stronger and less fragmented European institutions is "somewhat inconsistent" with the claim that "Europeanization interferes with diversity and therefore lacks legitimacy". In Political Studies Review, Katy Wilkinson described the work as a combination of "accessibility with detailed and diverse studies"; however, she observed that it "neither speaks convincingly to the governance literature nor offers fresh perspectives on BSE."

In Public Governance as Co-Creation: A Strategy for Revitalizing the Public Sector and Rejuvenating Democracy, Ansell and co-author Jacob Torfing developed the idea of co-creation as a way to produce public value and stimulate innovation. In another book titled Co-Creation for Sustainability: The UN SDGs and the Power of Local Partnerships, he explained local joint-creation efforts, the building of collaborative platforms, and empowering stakeholders to generate positive collective change. Christopher Walker criticized the book on its overuse of academic terms as compared to business, while also noting the "hidden gem" chapter which reflected the political challenges "associated with the transition to a sustainable future."

With Jarle Trondal and Morten Øgård, Ansell co-edited Governance in Turbulent Times, which developed the concept of turbulence as a perspective from which to understand contemporary governance. In another book titled Robust Governance in Turbulent Times, he proposed the idea of robustness as a strategy of managing turbulence. He also co-edited Handbook on Theories of Governance with Jacob Torfing.

== Awards and honors ==
- 2013 – Honorary Doctorate, Roskilde University
- 2018 – Fellow, National Academy of Public Administration
- 2025 – Top 2% Scientists, Stanford University

== Bibliography ==
=== Selected books ===
- Ansell, Christopher K. (2001). Schism and Solidarity in Social Movements: The Politics of Labor in the French Third Republic. Cambridge University Press. ISBN 9780521033961.
- Ansell, Christopher K. (2011). Pragmatist Democracy: Evolutionary Learning as Public Philosophy. Oxford University Press. ISBN 9780199772438.
- Ansell, Christopher, ed. (2016). What's the Beef?. The MIT Press. ISBN 9780262292344.
- Ansell, Christopher K.; Trondal, Jarle; Øgård, Morten, eds. (2017). Governance in turbulent times (1 ed.). Oxford University Press. ISBN 9780198739517.
- Ansell, Christopher K.; Torfing, Jacob (2021). Public governance as co-creation: a strategy for revitalizing the public sector and rejuvenating democracy. Cambridge University Press. ISBN 9781108765381.
- Ansell, Christopher K.; Sørensen, Eva; Torfing, Jacob (2022). Co-Creation for Sustainability: The UN SDGs and the Power of Local Partnerships (1st ed.). Emerald Publishing Limited. ISBN 9781800437982.
- Ansell, Christopher; Torfing, Jacob, eds. (2022). Handbook on Theories of Governance (Second ed.). Edward Elgar Publishing. ISBN 9781800371972.
- Ansell, Christopher K. (2024). Robust governance in turbulent times. Cambridge University Press. ISBN 9781009433006.

=== Selected articles ===
- Padgett, John F.; Ansell, Christopher K. (1993). "Robust Action and the Rise of the Medici, 1400-1434". American Journal of Sociology. 98 (6): 1259–1319. doi:10.1086/230190.
- Ansell, Chris; Gash, Alison (2008). "Collaborative Governance in Theory and Practice". Journal of Public Administration Research and Theory. 18 (4): 543–571. doi:10.1093/jopart/mum032.
- Ansell, Chris; Boin, Arjen; Keller, Ann (2010). "Managing Transboundary Crises: Identifying the Building Blocks of an Effective Response System". Journal of Contingencies and Crisis Management. 18 (4): 195–207. doi:10.1111/j.1468-5973.2010.00620.x.
- Ansell, Chris; Gash, Alison (2018). "Collaborative Platforms as a Governance Strategy". Journal of Public Administration Research and Theory. 28 (1): 16–32. doi:10.1093/jopart/mux030.
- Ansell, Christopher; Sørensen, Eva; Torfing, Jacob (2021). "The COVID-19 pandemic as a game changer for public administration and leadership? The need for robust governance responses to turbulent problems". Public Management Review. 23 (7): 949–960. doi:10.1080/14719037.2020.1820272.
