= Duncan Snidal =

British political scientist

Duncan Snidal, FBA is professor of international relations at the University of Oxford (Nuffield College) and professor emeritus at University of Chicago. Snidal has research interests in international relations theory, institutional organizations, cooperation, international law, and rational choice. Snidal's main research focus is on international relations theory, particularly issues of international cooperation and the design of global institutions. He examines how states and other international actors build, manage, and adapt institutions-both formal such as international organizations and informal such as the G20-to address global challenges, regulate trade, and create effective governance at the international level. His research also highlights the importance of international law, international organizations, rational choice, and international political economy in today's global dynamics.

Snidal is co-founder and editor of the journal International Theory, and serves as lead editor for several volumes of the Oxford Handbooks of International Relations. He is also active in research projects related to multiparty governance and changing international institutions in an era of global power shifts. Duncan Snidal is widely recognized as a highly influential thinker in the development of theories of international institutions, global cooperation, and international governance design.

== Selected publications ==
- Abbott, Kenneth W., and Duncan Snidal. “Hard and Soft Law in International Governance.” International Organization 54, no. 3 (2000): 421–56. https://doi.org/10.1162/002081800551280.
- Abbott, Kenneth W., and Duncan Snidal. “The Governance Triangle: Regulatory Standards Institutions and the Shadow of the State.” The Politics of Global Regulation 44 (2009): 44–88.
- Abbott, Kenneth W., and Duncan Snidal. “Why States Act through Formal International Organizations.” Journal of Conflict Resolution 42, no. 1 (1998): 3–32.
- Achen, Christopher H., and Duncan Snidal. “Rational Deterrence Theory and Comparative Case Studies.” World Politics 41, no. 2 (January 1989): 143–69.
- Grieco, Joseph, Robert Powell, and Duncan Snidal. “The Relative-Gains Problem for International Cooperation.” The American Political Science Review 87, no. 3 (1993): 727–43. https://doi.org/10.2307/2938747.
- Koremenos, Barbara, Charles Lipson, and Duncan Snidal. “The Rational Design of International Institutions.” International Organization 55, no. 4 (2001): 761–99. https://doi.org/10.1162/002081801317193592.
- Koremenos, Barbara, Charles Lipson, and Duncan Snidal. The Rational Design of International Institutions. Cambridge University Press, 2003.
- Reus-Smit, Christian, and Duncan Snidal, eds. The Oxford Handbook of International Relations. The Oxford Handbook of International Relations. Oxford University Press, 2009. https://doi.org/10.1093/oxfordhb/9780199219322.001.0001.
- Snidal, Duncan. “Coordination versus Prisoners’ Dilemma: Implications for International Cooperation and Regimes.” The American Political Science Review 79, no. 4 (December 1985): 923–42.
- Snidal, Duncan. “Relative Gains and the Pattern of International Cooperation.” The American Political Science Review 85, no. 3 (September 1991): 701–26. https://doi.org/10.2307/1963847.
- Snidal, Duncan. “The Game Theory of International Politics.” World Politics: A Quarterly Journal of International Relations, 1985, 25–57.
- Snidal, Duncan. “The Limits of Hegemonic Stability Theory.” International Organization 39, no. 4 (Autumn 1985): 579–614.
