= Michael Lounsbury =

American organizational theorist

Michael Lounsbury (born 1966) is an American organizational theorist, and a professor, the A.F (Chip) Collins Chair, and Chair of the strategy, entrepreneurship and management at the University of Alberta, and expert in innovation and institutions.

== Biography ==
Lounsbury received his Ph.D. from Northwestern University in 1999. Previously, he was a J. Thomas Clark Professor of Entrepreneurship and Personal Enterprise at Cornell University.

Currently he is a professor, the A.F. (Chip) Collins Chair, and Chair of Strategy, Entrepreneurship and Management at the University of Alberta, where he is the Academic Director of the eHUB Entrepreneurship Centre.

He is editor-in-chief of Research in the Sociology of Organizations published by Emerald Group Publishing.

In 2018, Lounsbury was elected as a Fellow of the Academy of Management (1% of membership) whose purpose is "to recognize and honor members of the Academy of Management who have made significant contributions to the science and practice of management". In 2020, Lounsbury received the J. Gordin Kaplan Award for Excellence in Research, the most prestigious University of Alberta research award. He is among the most highly cited researchers in the field of Management.

== Work ==
His research has contributed to the new institutionalism by focusing on entrepreneurial dynamics and the emergence of new industries and practices. He has published research on cultural entrepreneurship and social movement activism in the building of a recycling industry, money manager professionalization in the mutual fund industry, and the co-evolution of nanoscience and nanotechnology. His most recent work is on emancipatory entrepreneurship in the 2SLGBTQIA+ community.

His book, The Institutional Logics Perspective (coauthored with Patricia Thornton and William Ocasio), was the 2013 co-winner of the Academy of Management's George R. Terry book award. The prize is awarded to the book that makes the most outstanding contribution to management knowledge.

He is especially well known for his pioneering work on cultural entrepreneurship, and in 2019, he published with Mary Ann Glynn and Cambridge University Press book entitled, Cultural Entrepreneurship: A New Agenda for the Study of Entrepreneurial Processes and Possibilities.

In 2024, he published a book with Joel Gehman, A Concise Introduction to Organization Theory: From Ontological Differences to Robust Identities, that provides an important new introduction to the field of organization studies (publisher: Edward Elgar Publishing).

== Publications ==
His work has been published in top social science journals such as Administrative Science Quarterly, Academy of Management Journal, Academy of Management Review, Strategic Management Journal, and Organization Studies. A selection:

- 1997. (with Paul M. Hirsch) Ending the Family Quarrel: Towards a Reconciliation of “Old” and “New” Institutionalism. American Behavioral Scientist, 40: 406–418.
- 2001. Institutional Sources of Practice Variation: Staffing College and University Recycling Programs. Administrative Science Quarterly, 46: 29–56. Won J.D. Thompson Best Paper Award, Organizations, Occupations and Work section, American Sociological Association. Reprinted in Amy Wharton (Ed.) The Sociology of Organizations: An Anthology of Contemporary Theory and Research, Roxbury, 2007.
- 2001. (with Mary Ann Glynn) Cultural Entrepreneurship: Stories, Legitimacy and the Acquisition of Resources. Strategic Management Journal, 22: 545–564.
- 2002. Institutional Transformation and Status Mobility: The Professionalization of the Field of Finance. Academy of Management Journal, 45: 255–266.
- 2004. (with Hayagreeva Rao). Sources of Durability and Change in Market Classifications: A Study of the Reconstitution of Product Categories in the American Mutual Fund Industry, 1944–1985. Social Forces, 82: 969–999.
- 2007. A Tale of Two Cities: Competing Logics and Practice Variation in the Professionalizing of Mutual Funds. Academy of Management Journal, 50: 289–307.
- 2007. (with Ellen T. Crumley). New Practice Creation: An Institutional Approach to Innovation. Organization Studies, 28: 993–1012.
- 2007 (with Chris Marquis). Vive la Résistance: Competing Logics in the Consolidation of Community Banking. Academy of Management Journal, 50: 799–820.
- 2008. Institutional Rationality and Practice Variation: New Directions in the Institutional Analysis of Practice. Accounting, Organizations and Society, 33: 349–361
- 2009. (with Klaus Weber and Jerry Davis). Policy as Myth and Ceremony? The Spread of Stock Exchanges, 1980–2005. Academy of Management Journal, 52: 1319–1347.
- 2010. (with Mayer N. Zald). The Wizards of OZ: Towards an Institutional Approach to Elites, Expertise and Command Posts. Organization Studies, 31: 963–996.
- 2011. (with Tyler Wry Tyler and Mary Ann Glynn). Legitimizing Nascent Collective Identities: Coordinating Cultural Entrepreneurship. Organization Science, 22: 449–463.
- 2013 (with Zhao, Eric Yanfei, Ishihara, Masakazu) Overcoming the illegitimacy discount: Cultural entrepreneurship in the US feature film industry. Organization Studies, 34(12): 1747–1776.
- 2014 (with Wry, Tyler and Jennings, P. Devereaux) Hybrid vigor: securing venture capital by spanning categories in nanotechnology. Academy of Management Journal, 57: 1309–1333.
- 2015 (with Lee, Min-Dong) Filtering Institutional Logics: Community Logic Variation and Differential Responses to the Institutional Complexity of Toxic Waste. Organization Science, 26: 847–866.
- 2017 (with Micelotta, Evelyn and Royston Greenwood) Pathways of Institutional Change: An Integrative Review and Research Agenda. Journal of Management, 43: 1885–1910.
- 2017 (with Eric Yanfei Zhao, Greg Fisher & Danny Miller) Optimal Distinctiveness: Broadening the Interface between Institutional Theory and Strategic Management. Strategic Management Journal, 38: 93–113.
- 2017 (with Lee, B.H., Hiatt, S.R.) Market Mediators and the Trade-offs of Legitimacy-Seeking Behaviors in a Nascent Category. Organization Science, 28: 447–470.
- 2018 (with Eric Yanfei Zhao, Masakazu Ishihara, P. Devereaux Jennings) Optimal Distinctiveness in the Console Video Game Industry: An Exemplar-Based Model of Proto-Category Evolution. Organization Science, 29: 588–611.
- 2021 (with C. Steele, M. Wang & M. Toubiana) New Directions in the Study of Institutional Logics: From Tools to Phenomena. Annual Review of Sociology, 47:261–80.
- 2022. (with Taeuscher, K., Zhao, E.) Categories and narratives as sources of distinctiveness: Cultural entrepreneurship within and across categories. Strategic Management Journal, 43: 2101–2134.
- 2024 (with Weiss, T. & Bruton, G.) Survivalist Organizing in Urban Poverty Contexts. Organization Science, 35: 1608–1640.
- 2025 (with Taeuscher, K.) It is Not the Whole Story: Towards a Broader Understanding of Entrepreneurial Ventures’ Symbolic Differentiation. Academy of Management Journal.
- 2025 (with Augustine, G., Hedberg, L., Choi, T.) Wasted? Exploring the Downstream Effects of Movement-Backed Occupations. Administrative Science Quarterly.
