= The Emergence of Organizations and Markets =

2012 book by John F. Padgett and Walter W. Powell

- Cover
- Editor: John F. Padgett; Walter W. Powell
- Language: English
- Subject: Organizational sociology Organization; Industrial organization
- Publisher: Princeton University Press
- Publication date: October 14, 2012
- Publication place: United States
- Pages: 608
- ISBN: 978-0-691-14887-8 (paperback)
- OCLC: 2012004342
- Dewey Decimal: 302.35
- LC Class: HM786.E44 2012

The Emergence of Organizations and Markets is a 2012 edited volume by sociologists John F. Padgett and Walter W. Powell that studies how new organizational forms arise and transform through network evolution. The book presents a theoretical framework based on autocatalysis from chemistry to explain organizational innovation across fourteen historical case studies ranging from medieval Florence to Silicon Valley. The work synthesizes contributions from twenty-two authors who analyze the co-evolution of social, political, and economic networks in contexts including early capitalism, communist transitions, and contemporary biotechnology markets. The central argument posits that while actors create relations in the short term, these relations generate new actors and organizational forms in the long term through processes of network recombination and transformation.

== Background ==
In a 2014 interview with Pierre François, Padgett described his intellectual journey from electrical engineering to the study of Renaissance Florence, a transition shaped significantly by his collaboration with sociologist Harrison White at Harvard University. According to Padgett, White taught him a structuralist-constructivist worldview that fundamentally challenged his methodologically individualist training from Michigan graduate school. This perspective is encapsulated in the principle that "in the short run, actors make relations, but in the long run, relations make actors." The theoretical framework of the book was developed inductively from Padgett's archival research on Florentine networks and Powell's studies of biotechnology. Rather than applying predetermined models to historical data, their approach treats theory as the identification of generative processes rather than deterministic laws. They investigate how multiple networks co-evolve with institutions through autocatalytic processes, a concept that emerged from their empirical investigations rather than being imposed as an a priori framework. This methodology bridges the gap between the reductionism of formal modeling and the contextualism of historical narrative, treating history as dynamic social processes that continuously reconstruct themselves.

== Summary ==
The work studies how new organizational forms arise and transform throughout history, addressing what the authors term "Darwin's question" in the social sciences. This volume, ten years in the making at the Santa Fe Institute, develops a theoretical framework based on the concept of autocatalysis—borrowed from biochemistry's study of the origins of life—to explain organizational genesis and evolution through the dynamic interaction of multiple social networks.

The volume's central premise, as highlighted by the reviewers, is elegantly simple yet profound: "in the short run, actors make relations, but in the long run, those relations create the opportunities, or niches, that in turn produce the actors." This micro-to-macro-to-micro framework, characteristic of complex systems thinking, shows how individuals form connections that produce network patterns, which then become the context for future actions—thus relations ultimately produce actors.

The volume is structured in four main parts spanning 600 pages with 22 contributors.

Part I, "Autocatalysis," contains three foundational chapters that may prove challenging for non-specialists, as they are "brimming with scientific jargon and causal arrows showing reactions." These chapters explain how autocatalytic sets—where reactions produce outcomes that regenerate the set—provide more than mere metaphor for understanding social systems. Chapter 2 reviews the biochemistry literature on the origins of life, Chapter 3 develops agent-based models showing how economic production operates as chemistry, and Chapter 4 extends these models to include communication and language emergence, establishing that "the key difference between the chemical and the social is language."

Part II, "Early Capitalism and State Formation," comprises four historical chapters examining organizational innovations in European history through an autocatalytic lens. These include the emergence of corporate merchant-banks in thirteenth-century Tuscany, partnership systems in Renaissance Florence, the joint-stock company in the Netherlands, and the development of the Reichstag in Bismarck's Germany. The chapters demonstrate how these innovations emerged from spillovers across economic, political, religious, and kinship networks.

Part III, "Communist Transitions," analyzes organizational emergence in post-socialist contexts, showing how "mass mobilization under communism was all about the massive reconstruction (intended and unintended) of biographical flows." The chapters highlight economic reforms in the Soviet Union and China, financial market development in Yeltsin's Russia, the mobile telecom industry emergence, and business group evolution in Hungary.

Part IV, "Contemporary Capitalism and Science," focuses primarily on the biotechnology industry's emergence and development. The chapters trace how first-generation biotech firms assembled elements from science, finance, and commerce; how these firms catalyzed into regional clusters; the formation of an "open elite" core; and the spread of patenting in universities. Other chapters in the book analyze Silicon Valley's innovation networks and the open-source Debian community.

The authors identify eight mechanisms of organizational genesis, including "transposition and refunctionality," "anchoring diversity," "robust action and multivocality," and others with similarly evocative names. These mechanisms explain how practices from one domain can be transported and repurposed in another, creating genuinely novel organizational forms.

== Reviews ==
In his review, Scott E. Page characterized the work as "monumental, paradigm shifting, sprawling, and obsessed with detail," and praised what he considered an ambitious scope that spans from analytic chemistry to detailed analyses of state formation and the biotech industry. Page acknowledged certain limitations, noting that "Many will feel that the authors failed to leave enough breadcrumbs for others to follow in their path," while believing that the core contribution remained intact. He said that the authors succeeded in presenting a framework for understanding organizational novelty through careful historical readings and network evolution analysis. Page welcomed the empirical sections, commended the attention to detail in Padgett's analysis of the Medici and Powell's use of patent data for the biotech industry.

American sociologist James N. Baron focused on the formidable intellectual demands of the network autocatalytic approach presented in the work. Baron recognized that the authors distinguished between transformational inventions, which "cascade out to reconfigure entire interlinked ecologies of 'ways of doing things'," and incremental innovations. The reviewer identified the need for theories enabling ex ante predictions about evolutionary trajectories and emphasized the requirement for empirical studies whose results could be meaningfully compared.

Sven Steinmo praised the editors for bringing together "an impressive array of scholars from a wide range of disciplines" to construct what he termed a tour de force. Steinmo found the work's import of concepts from biology and chemistry to social sciences both interesting and important, rather than objectionable. He singled out the chapter by David Stark and Balázs Vedres for its insightful analysis of interactions between domestic and international actors in emerging networks. Steinmo wrote: "the extent to which this volume holds together is impressive, to say the least."

Özge Dilaver Kalkan acknowledged the work as an important edited volume that combines "insights from biochemical origins of life and social network analysis to study the emergence of organizational forms," finding this unusual synthesis both original and informative. Kalkan appreciated how the fourteen case studies made sense of detailed relational data through models of biological evolution, and noted that social networks are "congealed residues of history" that "don't just pass things; they do transformational work" on social entities. While praising the book's challenge to modernist science and its emphasis on autocatalysis over natural selection, Kalkan raised concerns about theoretical limitations. The reviewer questioned whether the synthetic approach adequately addressed agency, and observed that although the empirical studies studied influential actors from Pope Urban IV to Stalin and Mao in detail, "it is not clear at the theoretical side if and to what extent the synthetic approach developed in the book allows room for the agency of created actors."
