= Institutional theory =

Sociological and organizational studies theory

In sociology and organizational studies, institutional theory is a theory on the deeper and more resilient aspects of social structure. It considers the processes by which structures, including schemes, rules, norms, and routines, become established as authoritative guidelines for social behavior. Different components of institutional theory explain how these elements are created, diffused, adopted, and adapted over space and time; and how they fall into decline and disuse.

== Overview ==
In defining institutions, according to William Richard Scott (1995, 235), there is "no single and universally agreed definition of an 'institution' in the institutional school of thought." Scott (1995:33, 2001:48) asserts that:

Institutions are social structures that have attained a high degree of resilience. [They] are composed of cultural-cognitive, normative, and regulative elements that, together with associated activities and resources, provide stability and meaning to social life. Institutions are transmitted by various types of carriers, including symbolic systems, relational systems, routines, and facts. Institutions operate at different levels of jurisdiction, from the world system to localized interpersonal relationships. Institutions by definition connote stability but are subject to change processes, both incremental and discontinuous.

According to Scott (2008), institutional theory is "a widely accepted theoretical posture that emphasizes productivity, ethics, and legitimacy." Researchers building on this perspective emphasize that a key insight of institutional theory is ethics: rather than necessarily optimizing their decisions, practices, and structures, organizations look to their peers for cues to appropriate behavior.

According to Kraft's Public Policy (2007): Institutional Theory is "Policy-making that emphasizes the formal and legal aspects of government structures."

== Schools of institutional theory ==
There are two dominant trends in institutional theory:

- Old institutionalism
- New institutionalism

Powell and DiMaggio (1991) define an emerging perspective in sociology and organizational studies, which they term the 'new institutionalism', as rejecting the rational-actor models of Classical economics. Instead, it seeks cognitive and cultural explanations of social and organizational phenomena by considering the properties of supra-individual units of analysis that cannot be reduced to aggregations or direct consequences of individuals’ attributes or motives.

Scott (1995) indicates that, in order to survive, organisations must conform to the rules and belief systems prevailing in the environment (DiMaggio and Powell, 1983; Meyer and Rowan, 1977), because institutional isomorphism, both structural and procedural, will earn the organisation legitimacy (Dacin, 1997; Deephouse, 1996; Suchman, 1995). For instance, multinational corporations (MNCs) operating in different countries with varying institutional environments will face diverse pressures. Some of those pressures in host and home institutional environments are testified to exert fundamental influences on competitive strategy (Martinsons, 1993; Porter, 1990) and human resource management (HRM) practices (Rosenzweig and Singh, 1991; Zaheer, 1995; cf. Saqib, Allen and Wood, 2021;). Corporations also face institutional pressures from their most important peers: peers in their industry and peers in their local (headquarters) community; for example, Marquis and Tilcsik (2016) show that corporate philanthropic donations are largely driven by isomorphic pressures that companies experience from their industry peers and local peers. Non-governmental organisations (NGOs) and social organizations can also be susceptible to isomorphic pressures. Recent research has shown that municipalities, particularly in the context of digital transformation, are likewise exposed to coercive, mimetic, and normative isomorphism, as they respond to governmental regulations, imitate perceived best practices, and align with professional norms in order to gain legitimacy (Patalon and Wyczisk, 2024;).

More recent work in the field of institutional theory has led to the emergence of new concepts such as

- institutional logics, a concept pioneered by Friedland & Alford (1991) and later by Thornton, Ocasio & Lounsbury (2012). The institutional logic perspective mostly take a structural and macro approach to institutional analysis
- institutional work, a concept pioneered by Lawrence & Suddaby, (2006). In contrast to the logic perspective, this approach gives agentic power to social actors, and assumes those actors can influence institutions - either maintaining or disrupting them.

A recent stream of research looks at the intersection of space and place (with inspirations coming from geography) and institutional theory. Rodner et al. (2020) mobilize Lefebvre to show how institutional work can be spatial by nature, in the context of the disruption of the cultural sector in Venezuela under Chavez. They also differentiate the institutional conception of place vs space.

=== Challenges in different types of economies ===
There is substantial evidence that firms in different types of economies react differently to similar challenges (Knetter, 1989). Social, economic, and political factors constitute an institutional structure of a particular environment which provides firms with advantages for engaging in specific types of activities there. Businesses tend to perform more efficiently if they receive the institutional support.

== Institutional work ==
Created by Thomas Lawrence and Roy Suddaby (2006, pp. 217), the concept of institutional work refers to “the broad category of purposive action aimed at creating, maintaining, and disrupting institutions and businesses .” The focus of institutional work shifts away from more traditional institutional scholarship that offers strong accounts of the processes through which institutions govern action and, instead, examines how individuals’ active agency affects institutions. More recently the added value of the concept is explored in the context of environmental governance, where it offers novel opportunities for analysing the interactions between actors and institutional structures that produce stability and flexibility in governance systems.

In later work, Lawrence et al. (2011, pp. 52–53) specified the interest of institutional work in “the myriad, day-to-day equivocal instances of agency that, although aimed at affecting the institutional order, represent a complex mélange of forms of agency—successful and not, simultaneously radical and conservative, strategic and emotional, full of compromises, and rife with unintended consequences.

To understand institutional work and influences on institutions, an important idea to consider is path dependence, which states that past events constrain future outcomes. Highly prevalent in discussions of technological and economic development, a common example is the use of the QWERTY keyboard, a technologically inferior system that established long-term superiority over other options by gaining an initial advantage. When applied to political science, this idea can help explain how weak or inefficient institutions often resist change.

One reason for path-dependence is that institutions are often self-reinforcing, as powerful organizations with the ability to enact change rose to prominence within the existing institutional structure, and thus are incentivized to maintain that same structure. An example is the American health care system, which is incredibly complex, but arranged to the benefit of companies, agencies, and other actors that have the ability to force change. Another reason is increasing returns to adoption, meaning that as an institution is more widely adopted and accepted, the transition costs of changing greatly increase. This is shown in the dominance of fossil fuels, as the costs of changing over to renewables is high. A third reason is lock-in effects, by which an initial, sometimes random event starts a spiral. An example is the 2020 Beirut Warehouse Explosion, which caused massive devastation, in turn leading to increased instability, distrust of government, and a spiral of political unrest. These mechanisms of path dependence contribute to explaining the difficulties actors face in influencing institutions, and add an important dimension to the study of institutional work.

== Deinstitutionalization ==
Not to be confused with the deinstitutionalization (i.e. closure) of psychiatric hospitals, this term is also used by some researchers in the institutional theory literature to think about the different ways that an undesirable institution might be disrupted. For example, Maguire and Hardy (2009) examined the processes leading to the deinstitutionalization of DDT. This might include social movements from particular groups, such as the efforts leading to prohibition to deinstitutionalize the drinking of alcoholic beverages, or the social and institutional pressures that led to the deinstitutionalization of permanent employment in Japan. Public opinion can also lead to the deinstitutionalization of a practice, at least according to Clemente and Roulet (2015).

Deinstitutionalization may also be used in partial ways, as seen in the deinstitutionalization of particular Corporal Social Responsibility concepts to make way for new set of concepts, or in the deinstitutionalization of the practice of catching fish for sustenance.

== See also ==
- Institutional logics
- Institutional analysis
- Institutional economics
