= World polity theory =

Analytical framework for interpreting global relations, structures, and practices

World polity theory (also referred to as world society theory, global neo-institutionalism, and the Stanford school of global analysis) is an analytical framework for interpreting global relations, structures, and practices. The theory views the world system as a social system with a cultural framework called world polity, which encompasses and influences the actors under it. According to the theory, world polity provides a set of cultural norms and directions that actors of the world society follow in dealing with problems and general procedures.

According to John Boli and George M. Thomas, "the world polity is constituted by distinct culture – a set of fundamental principles and models, mainly ontological and cognitive in character, defining the nature and purposes of social actors and action." In contrast to other theories such as neo-realism or liberalism, the theory considers actors such as the states and institutions to be under the influence of global norms. Although it closely resembles constructivism, "world-polity theorists have been far more resolute in taking the 'cultural plunge' than their constructivism counterparts". In other words, world polity theory puts more emphasis on homogenization than the Other. Through globalization, world polity and culture trigger the formation of enactable cultures and organizations while in return cultures and organizations elaborate the world society further.

Beginning in the 1970s with its initiation by John W. Meyer of Stanford University, world polity analysis initially revolved around examining inter-state relations. It was developed partly in response to the application of world systems theory. Simultaneously in the 1970s and also in the 1980s, a significant amount of work was done on the international education environment. However, in the 1980s and 1990s, due to the noticeable influence of globalization on world culture, the direction of the study shifted towards analyzing the transnational social movement, while at the same time attempting to better understand how global polity ideas are implemented through global actors. According to Andreas Wimmer, the theory is "perhaps the most prominent and well-developed research program in sociology."

== Implications ==
Through a series of empirical studies, Meyer and others observed that new states organize themselves in a significantly similar manner despite their differing needs and background to give strength to their explanation that there is a set norm of forming a new state under the bigger umbrella of world polity.

Other instances suggest a definite presence of world polity:

1. A considerable degree of resemblance in national constitutions, which commonly contain the idea of self-determination, state sovereignty and territorial integrity.
2. Schooling around the world showing isomorphism.
3. Nitza Berkovitch stated that the occurrence of the international women's movement reflected the existence of world polity framework and so allows the world to be viewed as a single global social system.
4. An empirical study of INGOs (International nongovernmental organizations) shows the existence of universalism, individualism, rational voluntaristic authority, progress and world citizenship across different INGOS. Sports, human rights, and environmental INGOS especially tend to "reify" world polity. According to John Boli and George M. Thomas, who conducted this study, INGOS could instill world-cultural principles of world polity to nations by lobbying, criticizing, and convincing.

== Limitations ==
Critics point to the fact that world polity theory assumes a rather flawless and smooth transfer of norms of world polity to the global actors, which might not always be really plausible. Also, its tendency to focus on the homogenizing effect brings criticisms. World culture theory differs in this aspect from world polity theory because it recognizes that actors find their own identities in relation to the greater global cultural norm instead of simply following what is suggested by the world polity.

Also, an instance of glocalization cannot fully be explained by world polity theory. It is a phenomenon by which local values and global cultures converge to create something new.

== See also ==
- Environmental movement
- Nation state
- Olympic games
- Sociological institutionalism
- Women's rights
- World citizen
