= John W. Meyer =

American sociologist and professor (born 1935)

John Wilfred Meyer (born 1935) is an American sociologist and emeritus professor at Stanford University. Beginning in the 1970s and continuing to the present day, Meyer has contributed fundamental ideas to the field of sociology, especially in the areas of education, organizations, and global and transnational sociology. He is best known for the development of the neo-institutional perspective on globalization, known as world society or World Polity Theory. In 2015, he became the recipient of American Sociological Association's highest honor - W.E.B. Du Bois Career of Distinguished Scholarship Award.

== Education and career ==
Meyer received his B.A. in psychology from Goshen College, located in Goshen, Indiana in 1955; his M.A. in sociology from the University of Colorado in 1957; and his Ph.D. in sociology from Columbia University in 1965. Since 1966, he has been a professor at Stanford University (emeritus since 2001).

== Research ==
Most mainstream sociological perspectives are realist in orientation, building explanations around concrete actors and particular interests. By contrast, the Meyerian perspective is phenomenologically oriented. It stresses the dependence of local social organization on institutionalized models and definitions, promulgated by professionals and associations to promote collective goods. The dependence involved is more than causal influence. In the Meyerian view, institutional environments constitute local structures – establishing and defining their core entities, purposes, and interrelationships. Enacted models thus are often decoupled from local circumstances.

Meyer initially developed the general perspective in the context of schooling. Departing from conventional views, Meyer envisioned schools as embodiments of collective myth and ceremonial administration, deeply bound to Modern narratives of progress and justice. His framework, developed with Francisco O. Ramirez and others, reveals the profound extent to which local school arrangements depend on broader social institutions to supply their form and function.

He next applied his ideas to the field of organizations. He helped pioneer the sociological new institutionalism, stressing the role of loose coupling in organizational behavior and the conditions under which the diffusion of practices takes place (e.g. Organizational Environments, with W. Richard Scott, Sage 1983). A primary contention is that formal organizations incorporate institutionalized practices and procedures in order to maintain legitimacy. Organizations that align with the myths supplied by their institutional environments increase their survival prospects, even when doing so costs them internal coherence.

The third area in which Meyer's work has had broad influence, and the area in which his ideas may finally have their most durable impact, is in the analysis of world society. In 1980, he coined the term "world polity" to describe the stateless character of the international system and distinguish a civil society approach to globalization from existing world-systems analysis. Meyer and coauthors John Boli, Francisco O. Ramirez, and George M. Thomas applied insights from his analyses of organizations to the global level, showing that even nation-states are constituted, shaped, and restructured by forces operating in their enveloping institutional environments. This line of work uniquely accounts for several peculiar features of global change that other perspectives fail to notice: structural isomorphism; rapid, worldwide change in the nature and purposes of states in regard to environmentalism, the status of women, etc.; the decoupling of national development plans and programs from specific local conditions; and so on. The development of this theoretical paradigm has motivated much of Meyer's later work. Accordingly, Meyer's earlier interests in schooling and organizations were subsequently explored in the context of world society, e.g. the influences of modern world practices on educational systems and their expansion over time.

Over the course of his career, Meyer has authored or co-authored more than 200 scholarly articles and books. In 2009, Georg Krücken and Gili S. Drori edited a retrospective of Meyer's work entitled World Society: The Writings of John W. Meyer. Currently, he is studying the impact of the human rights regime worldwide, and the impact of global society on national states and societies.

== Selected publications ==
- 1977. "The Effects of Education as an Institution." American Journal of Sociology 83: 55–77.
- 1977. "Institutionalized Organizations: Formal Structure as Myth and Ceremony" (with Brian Rowan). American Journal of Sociology 83: 340–63.
- 1980. "The World Polity and the Authority of the Nation-State." In A. Bergesen (ed.), Studies of the Modern World-System. Academic Press: 109–37.
- 1984. "The Expansion of the State" (with George M. Thomas). Annual Review of Sociology 10: 461–82.
- 1985. "Explaining the Origins and Expansion of Mass Education" (with John Boli and Francisco O. Ramirez). Comparative Education Review 29: 145–68.
- 1992. "World Expansion of Mass Education, 1870-1970" (with Francisco O. Ramirez and Yasemin N. Soysal). Sociology of Education 65: 128–49.
- 1993. "Institutional Conditions for Diffusion" (with David Strang). Theory and Society 22: 487–511.
- 1997. "World Society and the Nation-State" (with John Boli, George M. Thomas, and Francisco O. Ramirez). American Journal of Sociology 103: 144–81.
- 2000. "The 'Actors' of Modern Society: The Cultural Construction of Social Agency" (with Ronald Jepperson). Sociological Theory 18: 100–20.
- 2002. "The Profusion of Individual Roles and Identities in the Post-War Period” (with David John Frank). Sociological Theory 20: 86–105.
- 2003. Science in the Modern World Polity: Institutionalization and Globalization (with Gili S. Drori, Francisco O. Ramirez, and Evan Schofer). Stanford University Press.
- 2005. "The Worldwide Expansion of Higher Education in the Twentieth Century” (with Evan Schofer). American Sociological Review 70: 898-920.
- 2006. Globalization and Organizations (with Gili S. Drori and Hokyu Hwang). Oxford University Press.
- 2006. "Scientization: Making a World Safe for Organizing" (with Gili S. Drori). In M.-L. Djelic and K. Sahlin-Andersson (eds.), Transnational Governance: Institutional Dynamics of Regulation. Cambridge University Press.
- 2006. "Student Achievement and National Economic Growth" (with Francisco O. Ramirez, Xiaowei Luo, and Evan Schofer). American Journal of Education vol. 113.
- 2007. “University Expansion and the Knowledge Society” (with David John Frank). Theory and Society 36: 287–311.
- 2009. World Society: The Writings of John W. Meyer (edited by Georg Krücken and Gili S. Drori). Oxford University Press.
- 2010. "World Society, Institutional Theories, and the Actor." Annual Review of Sociology 36: 1-20.
- 2015. Hyper-Organization: Global Organizational Expansion (with Patricia Bromley). Oxford University Press.
- 2020. The University and the Global Knowledge Society (with David John Frank). Princeton University Press.
- 2021. "The Societal Consequences of Higher Education” (with Evan Schofer and Francisco Ramirez). Sociology of Education 94: 1-19.
- 2021. Institutional Theory: The Cultural Construction of Organizations, States, and Identities (with Ronald Jepperson). Cambridge University Press.

== Awards and recognition ==
Meyer has won numerous awards based on his research and service. They include:

- W.E.B. Du Bois Career of Distinguished Scholarship Award from the American Sociological Association, 2015
- Election to the National Academy of Education
- Distinguished Career Award from the Global and Transnational Sociology Section of the American Sociological Association 2011
- Honorary Doctorate of Sociology from the University of Lucerne 2007
- Honorary Doctorate of Sociology from Bielefeld University 2006
- Graduate Service Recognition Award, GSPB, Stanford University 2001
- Honorary Doctorate of Economics from Stockholm School of Economics 1996
- Waller Award for Lifetime Contributions to the Sociology of Education from the American Sociological Association's Sociology of Education Section 1995
