= Institutional logic =

Concept in sociological theory

Institutional logic is a core concept in sociological theory and organizational studies, with growing interest in marketing theory. It focuses on how broader belief systems shape the cognition and behavior of actors.

Friedland and Alford (1991) wrote: "Institutions are supraorganizational patterns of human activity by which individuals and organizations produce and reproduce their material subsistence and organize time and space. They are also symbolic systems, ways of ordering reality, and thereby rendering experience of time and space meaningful". Friedland and Alford (1991, p. 248) elaborated: "Each of the most important orders of contemporary Western societies has a central logic – a set of material practices and symbolic constructions – which constitute its organising principles and which is available to organizations and individuals to elaborate." Thornton and Ocasio (1999: 804) define institutional logics as "the socially constructed, historical patterns of material practices, assumptions, values, beliefs, and rules by which individuals produce and reproduce their material subsistence, organize time and space, and provide meaning to their social reality".

== Overview ==
Focusing on macro-societal phenomena, Friedland and Alford (1991: 232) identified several key Institutions: the Capitalist market, bureaucratic state, democracy, nuclear family, and Christianity that are each guided by a distinct institutional logic. Thornton (2004) revised Friedland and Alford's (1991) inter-institutional scheme to six institutional orders, i.e., the market, the corporation, the professions, the state, the family, and religions. More recently, Thornton, Ocasio and Lounsbury (2012), in more fully fleshing out the institutional logic perspective, added community as another key institutional order. This revision to a theoretically abstract and analytically distinct set of ideal types makes it useful for studying multiple logics in conflict and consensus, the hybridization of logics, and institutions in other parts of society and the world. While building on Friedland and Alford's scheme, the revision addresses the confusion created by conflating institutional sectors with ideology (democracy) and means of organization (bureaucracy), variables that can be characteristic several different institutional sectors. The institutional logic of Christianity leaves out other religions in the US and other religions that are dominant in other parts of the world. Thornton and Ocasio (2008) discuss the importance of not confusing the ideal types of the inter-institutional system with a description of the empirical observations in a study—that is to use the ideal types as meta theory and method of analysis.

== New institutionalism ==
While the concept of institutional logics has emerged from the new institutional theory, also called "neo-institutional theory", it expands its theoretical scope by not only explaining homogeneity but also heterogeneity in organizational and individual behavior.

Organizational theorists operating within the new institutionalism (see also institutional theory) have begun to develop the institutional logics concept by empirically testing it. One variant emphasizes how logics can focus the attention of key decision-makers on a particular set of issues and solutions (Ocasio, 1997), leading to logic-consistent decisions (Thornton, 2002). A fair amount of research on logics has focused on the importance of dominant logics and shifts from one logic to another (e.g., Lounsbury, 2002; Thornton, 2002; Suddaby & Greenwood, 2005). Haveman and Rao (1997) showed how the rise of Progressive thought enabled a shift in savings and loan organizational forms in the U.S. in the early 20th century. Scott et al. (2000) detailed how logic shifts in healthcare led to the valorization of different actors, behaviors and governance structures. Thornton and Ocasio (1999) analyzed how a change from professional to market logics in U.S. higher education publishing led to corollary changes in how executive succession was carried out.

While much earlier work focused on ambiguity as a result of multiple and conflicting institutional logics, at the levels of analysis of society and individual roles, Friedland and Alford (1991:248-255) discussed in theory multiple and competing logics at the macro level of analysis. Recent empirical research, inspired by the work of Bourdieu, is developing a more pluralistic approach by focusing on multiple competing logics and contestation of meaning. By focusing on how some fields are composed of multiple logics, and thus, multiple forms of institutionally-based rationality, institutional analysts can provide new insight into practice variation and the dynamics of practice. Multiple logics can create diversity in practice by enabling variety in cognitive orientation and contestation over which practices are appropriate. As a result, such multiplicity can create enormous ambiguity, leading to logic blending, the creation of new logics, and the continued emergence of new practice variants. Thornton, Jones, and Kury (2005) showed how competing logics may never resolve but share the market space as in the case of architectural services. Recent contributions have reconceptualized isomorphism as a situated and interpretive process, showing that organizations respond to similar coercive, mimetic, and normative pressures in different ways depending on how these are mediated by local constellations of institutional logics.

Recent research has also documented the co-existence or potential conflict of multiple logics within particular organizations. Zilber (2002), for example, described the organizational consequences of a shift from one logic to another within an Israeli rape crisis center, in which new organization members reshaped the center and its practices to reflect a new dominant logic that they have carried into the organization. Tilcsik (2010) documented a logic shift in a post-Communist government agency, describing a conflict between the agency's old guard (carriers of the logic of Communist state bureaucracies) and its new guard (carriers of a market logic). This study shows that, paradoxically, an intra-organizational group's efforts to resist a particular logic might in fact open the organization's door to carriers of that very logic. Almandoz (2012) examined the embeddedness of new local banks' founding teams in a community logic or a financial logic, linking institutional logics to new banking venture's establishment and entrepreneurial success. As these studies demonstrate, the institutional logics perspective offers valuable insights into important intra-organizational processes affecting organizational practices, change, and success. These studies represent an effort to understand institutional complexity due to conflicting or inconsistent logics within particular organizations, a situation that might results from the entry of new organization members or the layering (or "sedimentation") of new organizational imprints upon old ones over time.

== Institutional theory in marketing ==
This growing area of research highlights the way that market structures, processes and consumer behaviors can be shaped by different institutional logics. For example, different rhetorical strategies grounded in particular institutional logics might be used in order to better persuade potential consumers.

Much like the growing use of institutional theory in marketing, we also find more use of institutional logics in marketing. For example, Eritmur and Coskuner-Balli examined the conflicting institutional logics of the yoga market, highlighting the coexistence of the fitness, commercial, spiritual, and medical logic. Thompson-Whiteside and Turnbull employ the institutional logics framing to evaluate continued gender stereotypes in advertising.

Much like in management, this research has gone beyond showing the existence of a particular institutional logic into situations of so-called institutional complexity where there are multiple coexisting and often conflicting institutional logics present in a given domain (See Greenwood et al. 2011). For example, social entrepreneurs must combine elements of business and social purpose. Dolbec and coauthors also consider how ongoing institutional complexity may foster market evolution. Work in this last line of argument is where the interest in institutional logics intersects with research in market shaping and market system dynamics.

More recent research has examined how firms and consumers might navigate conflicting institutional logics. For example, a study of Italian ketogenic dieters found they undertook "emotion work" to navigate the institutional complexity in this area, given that the ketogenic diet conflicted with the traditional Italian diet. Similarly, market intermediaries may use particular rhetorical strategies to navigate multiple institutional logics, as seen in the case of agencies seeking to recruit women to donate their eggs for donor-assisted IVF. Firms, similarly, must also navigate situations of institutional complexity in markets, as seen in the varying emphasis on fitness, spirituality and commercial logics by different schools and entrepreneurs in the yoga industry.

== Historicizing institutional logics ==
Recent work in institutional theory has attempted to bring historiography into an understanding of institutions. In particular, scholars have drawn onto the Annales School in history. Concepts such as mentalities, critical events, and time horizon have been mapped out and explained in institutional terms, to be mobilized in future research. Such theoretical framework complements existing apparatus in institutional theory, in the sense that it helps understand historical and temporal dynamics in institutional theory.

== See also ==
- Business model
- Concept-driven strategy
- Meaning-making
- Sensemaking
