= Walter W. Powell =

American sociologist

Walter Woodrow Powell
- Born: August 15, 1951 (age 75)

Academic background
- Education: Florida State University; Stony Brook University
- Thesis: Getting in Print: A Study of Two Firms that Publish Books in the Social Sciences (1978)
- Doctoral advisor: Lewis Coser
- Other advisors: Charles Perrow, Mark Granovetter
- Website: woodypowell.com

Walter W. Powell (born August 15, 1951), also known as Woody Powell, is a contemporary American sociologist. Powell is Professor of Education, Sociology, Organizational Behavior, Management Science and Engineering, and Communication at Stanford University and the Stanford Graduate School of Education since 1999 and is known for his contributions to organizational theory, in particular to the new institutionalism and network theory. Since 2000, he has been an external faculty member of the Santa Fe Institute.

Powell received his Ph.D. and M.A. in sociology from the State University of New York, Stony Brook. Powell earned a B.A. from Florida State University.

Professor Powell works in the areas of organization theory and economic sociology. Powell is widely known for his contributions to institutional analysis, beginning with his article with Paul DiMaggio, "The Iron Cage Revisited: Institutional Isomorphism and Collective Rationality in Organizational Fields" (1983) and their subsequent edited book, The New Institutionalism in Organizational Analysis (1991). These works are widely considered seminal to the development of the new institutionalism within organizational theory.

Powell is also engaged in research on the origins and development of the commercial field of the life sciences, and the dynamics of collaboration that knit together this field. This line of work continues his interests in networks as a governance mechanism, first developed in his seminal 1990 article, "Neither Market Nor Hierarchy: Network Forms of Organization," which won the American Sociological Association's Max Weber Prize. Powell and his collaborators have developed a longitudinal database that tracks the development of the biotechnology industry worldwide from the 1980s to the present.

Powell is author and co-author of a number of books: The Culture and Commerce of Publishing (1982), an analysis of the transformation of book publishing from a family-run, craft-based field into a multinational media industry, and author of Getting Into Print (1985), an ethnographic study of decision-making processes in scholarly publishing houses. He has conducted numerous studies of nonprofit organizations, ranging from public television and university presses to art museums and higher education. He edited The Nonprofit Sector (1987, referred to by reviewers as "the Bible of scholarship on the nonprofit sector"). The second edition of the handbook, co-edited with Richard Steinberg, was published by Yale University Press in 2006. Powell is also co-editor with Elisabeth Clemens of Private Action and the Public Good (1998).

In 2007, Powell was elected a foreign member of the Royal Swedish Academy of Sciences.

== Publications ==
- DiMaggio, Paul J., and Walter W. Powell. 1983. "The iron cage revisited: Institutional isomorphism and collective rationality in organizational fields." American Sociological Review 48:147-60.
- Powell, Walter W., and Paul J. DiMaggio (Eds.). 1991. The New Institutionalism in Organizational Analysis. Chicago, IL: University of Chicago Press.
- Powell, Walter W. 1990. "Neither market nor hierarchy: Network forms of organization." Pp. 295–336 in Research in Organizational Behavior, edited by Barry M. Staw and L. L. Cummings: JAI.
- Powell, W. W., K. W. Koput, and L. Smith-Doerr. 1996. "Interorganizational Collaboration and the Locus of Innovation: Networks of Learning in Biotechnology." Administrative Science Quarterly 41:116-145.
- Padgett, J. F., and W. W. Powell, eds. 2012. The Emergence of Organizations and Markets. Princeton: Princeton University Press.
