= Paul DiMaggio =

American sociologist

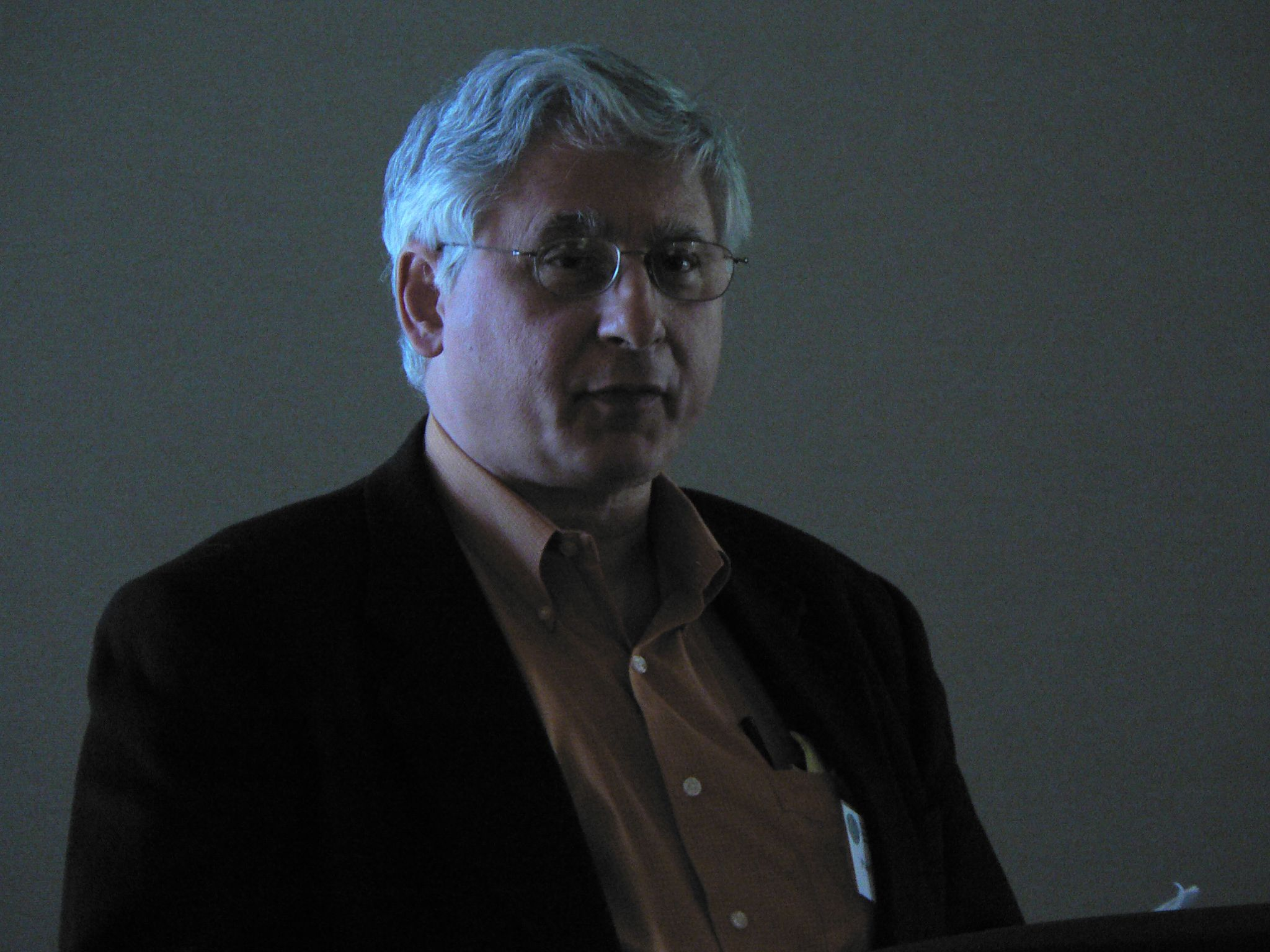
Cornell/Microsoft Research International Symposium on Self-Organizing Online Communities

Paul Joseph DiMaggio (born January 10, 1951, in Philadelphia, Pennsylvania) is an American educator, and professor of sociology at New York University since 2015. Previously, he was a professor of sociology at Princeton University.

== Biography ==
A graduate of Swarthmore College, DiMaggio earned his Ph.D. in sociology from Harvard in 1979. He was the executive director of Yale's program on nonprofit organizations (1982–87), and through 1991 he was a professor in the sociology department at the university. He was a fellow at the Center for Advanced Study in the Behavioral Sciences (1984–85) and at the John Simon Guggenheim Memorial Foundation (1990). He also served on the Connecticut Commission on the Arts and on the board of the National Assembly of State Arts Agencies. He was elected to the American Philosophical Society in 2016.

== Work ==
DiMaggio's major works have been in the study of institutions and organizations and the formation of "high culture" in the U.S. His recent research explores social inequality in the Internet.

According to DiMaggio, belief systems and cultural frames are imposed on and adapted by individual actors and organisations. Thus, roles are for a large part determined by larger structures.

In a much-quoted article, DiMaggio and Walter W. Powell argued that organizations, whether corporate, governmental, or non-profit, adopt business practices not because they are efficient, but because they furnish legitimacy in the eyes of outside stakeholders, e. g. lenders, government regulators, and shareholders, as they need to maintain the confidence of these often poorly-informed outside parties. This makes them less creative and innovative in their practices, and leads to institutional isomorphism.

In his cultural studies, DiMaggio's historical research documented the self-conscious creation of "high culture" in the late 19th-century America. DiMaggio argues that, unsettled by the weak class distinctions in growing industrial cities, local elites created a "sophisticated" culture (via the arts, universities, social clubs, and the like) that would separate commoners from those of high standing. DiMaggio says that "high culture" models developed by founders of museums and orchestras were then adopted by patrons of opera, dance, and theatre.

DiMaggio's recent research considers the cultural advent of the Internet. He compares the emergence of the Internet with the rise of television in the 1950s. Television was introduced to American consumers in 1948, and within ten years 90% of households had TV. In contrast, Internet diffusion (introduced on a large scale in 1994) seems to have stalled at approximately 60% of American households. DiMaggio believes that this difference is the result of the so-called digital divide - inequalities in Internet usage by race, income, and education level. DiMaggio maintains that these inequalities were not found in the adoption of TV in the 1950s, and suggests that differences in Internet usage among social groups will continue. This remains an open question, and some recent data suggest Internet usage is growing, with more than 70% of American adults reporting that they use the Internet.

== Selected bibliography ==
- The Twenty-First Century Firm: Changing Economic Organization in International Perspective (editor), Princeton University Press 2001 ISBN 0-691-11631-8
- Race, Ethnicity, and Participation in the Arts with Francie Ostrower, Seven Locks Press 1992 ISBN 0-929765-03-6
- The New Institutionalism in Organizational Analysis (editor with Walter Powell), University of Chicago Press 1991 ISBN 0-226-67709-5
- Managers of the Arts, Seven Locks Press 1988 ISBN 0-932020-50-X
- Nonprofit Enterprise in the Arts: Studies in Mission and Constraint (editor), Oxford University Press 1987 ISBN 0-19-504063-5
- "The Iron Cage Revisited: Institutional Isomorphism and Collective Rationality in Organizational Fields,” in American Sociological Review 48:147-160, 1983. (With Walter W. Powell).
