= Rational choice model =

Class of models in the behavioral sciences

Rational choice modeling refers to the use of decision theory (the theory of rational choice) as a set of guidelines to help understand economic and social behavior. The theory tries to approximate, predict, or mathematically model human behavior by analyzing the behavior of a rational actor facing the same costs and benefits.

Rational choice models are most closely associated with economics, where mathematical analysis of behavior is standard. However, they are widely used throughout the social sciences, and are commonly applied to cognitive science, criminology, political science, and sociology.

== Overview ==
Rational choice theory assumes that individuals have discrete preferences among available choices and these preferences can be meaningfully ordered and weighed against each other so that an individual can decide on an action by balancing costs and benefits. These preferences are assumed to be complete and transitive. As outlined in instrumental rationality the individual may or may not include the path to the goal as a factor in the decision.

For the purposes of rational choice theory, a decision is rational if it is the logical outcome of the stated preferences. More specifically, behavior is only considered irrational if it is logically incoherent.

Early neoclassical economists writing about rational choice, including William Stanley Jevons, assumed that agents make consumption choices so as to maximize their happiness, or utility. Contemporary theory typically does not specify where the goal (preferences, desires) comes from, and mandates just a consistent ranking of the alternatives. Duncan Snidal emphasises that the goals are not restricted to self-regarding, selfish, or material interests. They include other-regarding, altruistic, as well as normative or ideational goals.

Despite the empirical shortcomings of rational choice theory, the flexibility and tractability of rational choice models (and the lack of equally powerful alternatives) lead to them still being widely used.

== Applications ==
Rational choice theory has become increasingly employed in social sciences other than economics, such as sociology, evolutionary theory and political science in recent decades. It has had far-reaching impacts on the study of political science, especially in fields like the study of interest groups, elections, behaviour in legislatures, coalitions, and bureaucracy. In these fields, the use of rational choice theory to explain broad social phenomena is the subject of controversy.

=== Rational choice theory in political science ===
Rational choice theory provides a framework to explain why groups of rational individuals can come to collectively irrational decisions. For example, while at the individual level a group of people may have common interests, applying a rational choice framework to their individually rational preferences can explain group-level outcomes that fail to accomplish any one individual's preferred objectives. Rational choice theory provides a framework to describe outcomes like this as the product of rational agents performing their own cost–benefit analysis to maximize their self-interests, a process that doesn't always align with the group's preferences.

==== Rational choice in voting behavior ====
Voter behaviour shifts significantly thanks to rational theory, which is ingrained in human nature, the most significant of which occurs when there are times of economic trouble. An example in economic policy, economist Anthony Downs concluded that a high income voter ‘votes for whatever party he believes would provide him with the highest utility income from government action’, using rational choice theory to explain people's income as their justification for their preferred tax rate.

Downs' work provides a framework for analyzing tax-rate preference in a rational choice framework. He argues that an individual votes if it is in their rational interest to do so. Downs models this utility function as B + D > C, where B is the benefit of the voter winning, D is the satisfaction derived from voting and C is the cost of voting. It is from this that we can determine that parties have moved their policy outlook to be more centric in order to maximise the number of voters they have for support. It is from this very simple framework that more complex adjustments can be made to describe the success of politicians as an outcome of their ability or failure to satisfy the utility function of individual voters.

==== Rational choice theory in international relations ====
Rational choice theory has become one of the major tools used to study international relations. Proponents of its use in this field typically assume that states and the policies crafted at the national outcome are the outcome of self-interested, politically shrewd actors including, but not limited to, politicians, lobbyists, businesspeople, activists, regular voters and any other individual in the national audience. The use of rational choice theory as a framework to predict political behavior has led to a rich literature that describes the trajectory of policy to varying degrees of success. For example, some scholars have examined how states can make credible threats to deter other states from a (nuclear) attack. Others have explored under what conditions states wage war against each other. Yet others have investigated under what circumstances the threat and imposition of international economic sanctions tend to succeed and when they are likely to fail.

=== Rational choice theory in social interactions ===
G.S Becker concludes that people marry if the expected utility from such marriage exceeds the utility one would gain from remaining single, and in the same way couples would separate should the utility of being together be less than expected and provide less (economic) benefit than being separated would.

George C. Homans suggested that behavior of humans in social situations can be modelled as individual actors who have preferences on how others behave, and expectations based on their personal history.

== Criticism ==
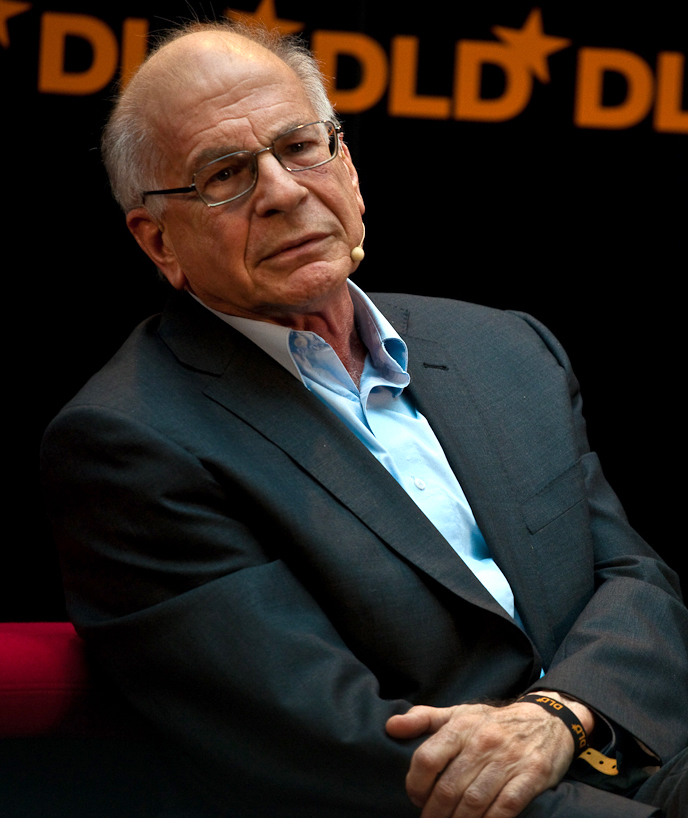
Daniel Kahneman

Both the assumptions and the behavioral predictions of rational choice theory have sparked criticism from various camps. The fundamental concept of rational choice theory has been criticized by numerous economists and philosophers for decades.

Some economists have developed models of bounded rationality, such as Herbert Simon, which hope to be more psychologically plausible without completely abandoning the idea that reason underlies decision-making processes. His concepts of 'satisficing' and 'optimizing' suggest sometimes we settle for a decision which is good enough, rather than the best decision. Other economists have developed more theories of human decision-making that allow for the roles of uncertainty, institutions, and determination of individual tastes by their socioeconomic environment.

=== Psychological critiques ===
The validity of Rational Choice Theory has been generally refuted by the results of research in behavioral psychology. The revision or alternative theory that arises from these discrepancies is called Prospect Theory.

The 'doubly-divergent' critique of Rational Choice Theory implicit in Prospect Theory has sometimes been presented as a revision or alternative. Daniel Kahneman's work has been notably elaborated by research undertaken and supervised by Jonathan Haidt and other scholars.

=== Empirical critiques ===
In their 1994 work, Pathologies of Rational Choice Theory, Donald P. Green and Ian Shapiro argue that the empirical outputs of rational choice theory have been limited. They contend that much of the applicable literature, at least in political science, was done with weak statistical methods and that when corrected many of the empirical outcomes no longer hold. When taken in this perspective, rational choice theory has provided very little to the overall understanding of political interaction – and is an amount certainly disproportionately weak relative to its appearance in the literature. Yet, they concede that cutting-edge research, by scholars well-versed in the general scholarship of their fields (such as work on the U.S. Congress by Keith Krehbiel, Gary Cox, and Mat McCubbins) has generated valuable scientific progress.

=== Methodological critiques ===
Schram and Caterino (2006) contains a fundamental methodological criticism of rational choice theory for promoting the view that the natural science model is the only appropriate methodology in social science and that political science should follow this model, with its emphasis on quantification and mathematization. Schram and Caterino argue instead for methodological pluralism. The same argument is made by William E. Connolly, who in his work Neuropolitics shows that advances in neuroscience further illuminate some of the problematic practices of rational choice theory.

=== Sociological critiques ===
Pierre Bourdieu fiercely opposed rational choice theory as grounded in a misunderstanding of how social agents operate. Bourdieu argued that social agents do not continuously calculate according to explicit rational and economic criteria. According to Bourdieu, social agents operate according to an implicit practical logic – a practical sense – and bodily dispositions. Social agents act according to their "feel for the game" (the "feel" being, roughly, habitus, and the "game" being the field).

Other social scientists, inspired in part by Bourdieu's thinking have expressed concern about the inappropriate use of economic metaphors in other contexts, suggesting that this may have political implications. The argument they make is that by treating everything as a kind of "economy" they make a particular vision of the way an economy works seem more natural. Thus, they suggest, rational choice is as much ideological as it is scientific.

==== Criticism based on motivational assumptions ====
Rational choice theorists discuss individual values and structural elements as equally important determinants of outcomes. However, for methodological reasons in the empirical application, more emphasis is usually placed on social structural determinants. Therefore, in line with structural functionalism and social network analysis perspectives, rational choice explanations are considered mainstream in sociology.

==== Criticism based on the assumption of realism ====
Some of the scepticism among sociologists regarding rational choice stems from their perspective on realist assumptions. Social research has shown that social agents usually act solely based on habit or impulse, the power of emotion. For example, people predict the expected consequences of various options in stock markets or during economic crises, and they choose the best option through collective "emotional drives," implying social forces rather than "rational" choices.

Economists counterargue that critics in sociology commonly misunderstand rational choice when critiquing rational choice theory. Rational choice theory does not explain what rational people would do in a given situation, which falls under decision theory. Theoretical choice focuses on social outcomes rather than individual outcomes. Social outcomes are identified as stable equilibria in which individuals have no incentive to deviate from their course of action. This orientation of others' behaviour toward social outcomes may be unintended or undesirable. Therefore, the conclusions generated in such cases are relegated to the "study of irrational behaviour".

=== Criticism based on the biopolitical paradigm ===
The basic assumptions of rational choice theory do not take into account external factors (social, cultural, economic) that interfere with autonomous decision-making. Representatives of the biopolitical paradigm such as Michel Foucault drew attention to the micro-power structures that shape the soul, body and mind and thus top-down impose certain decisions on individuals. Humans – according to the assumptions of the biopolitical paradigm – therefore conform to dominant social and cultural systems rather than to their own subjectively defined goals, which they would seek to achieve through rational and optimal decisions.

=== Critiques on the basis of evolutionary psychology ===
An evolutionary psychology perspective suggests that many of the seeming contradictions and biases regarding rational choice can be explained as being rational in the context of maximizing biological fitness in the ancestral environment but not necessarily in the current one. Thus, when living at subsistence level where a reduction of resources may have meant death it may have been rational to place a greater value on losses than on gains. Proponents argue it may also explain differences between groups.

=== Critiques on the basis of emotion research ===
Proponents of emotional choice theory criticize the rational choice paradigm by drawing on new findings from emotion research in psychology and neuroscience. They point out that rational choice theory is generally based on the assumption that decision-making is a conscious and reflective process based on thoughts and beliefs. It presumes that people decide on the basis of calculation and deliberation. However, cumulative research in neuroscience suggests that only a small part of the brain's activities operate at the level of conscious reflection. The vast majority of its activities consist of unconscious appraisals and emotions. The significance of emotions in decision-making has generally been ignored by rational choice theory, according to these critics. Moreover, emotional choice theorists contend that the rational choice paradigm has difficulty incorporating emotions into its models, because it cannot account for the social nature of emotions. Even though emotions are felt by individuals, psychologists and sociologists have shown that emotions cannot be isolated from the social environment in which they arise. Emotions are inextricably intertwined with people's social norms and identities, which are typically outside the scope of standard rational choice models. Emotional choice theory seeks to capture not only the social but also the physiological and dynamic character of emotions. It represents a unitary action model to organize, explain, and predict the ways in which emotions shape decision-making.

=== The difference between public and private spheres ===
Herbert Gintis has also provided an important criticism to rational choice theory. He argued that rationality differs between the public and private spheres. The public sphere being what you do in collective action and the private sphere being what you do in your private life. Gintis argues that this is because “models of rational choice in the private sphere treat agents’ choices as instrumental”. “Behaviour in the public sphere, by contrast, is largely non-instrumental because it is non-consequential". Individuals make no difference to the outcome, “much as single molecules make no difference to the properties of the gas" (Herbert, G). This is a weakness of rational choice theory as it shows that in situations such as voting in an election, the rational decision for the individual would be to not vote as their vote makes no difference to the outcome of the election. However, if everyone were to act in this way the democratic society would collapse as no one would vote. Therefore, we can see that rational choice theory does not describe how everything in the economic and political world works, and that there are other factors of human behaviour at play.

== See also ==
- Bibliography of sociology
- Decision theory – Branch of applied probability theory
- Ecological rationality
- Emotional choice theory
- Homo economicus – Model of humans as rational, self-interested agents
- Positive political theory – Study of politics using formal methods
- Public choice – Economic theory applied to political science
- Rational egoism – Principle that an action is rational if it maximizes one's self-interest
- Rational expectations – Economics concept
- Reasonable person model – Form of psychological framework
- Social choice theory – Study of rational collective decision-making
- Tyranny of small decisions – Economic phenomenon
- Preference – To like one thing more than another
