= List of Guggenheim Fellowships awarded in 2020 =

List of Guggenheim Fellowships awarded in 2020: Guggenheim Fellowships have been awarded annually since 1925, by the John Simon Guggenheim Memorial Foundation to those "who have demonstrated exceptional capacity for productive scholarship or exceptional creative ability in the arts."

Fellow	Category	Field of study
Rheim Alkadhi	Creative Arts	Fine Arts
Arturo Arias	Humanities	Literary Criticism
Lawrie Balfour	Humanities	American Literature
Blitz Bazawule	Creative Arts	Film – Video
Sanford Biggers	Creative Arts	Fine Arts
J Stoner Blackwell	Creative Arts	Fine Arts
Suzanne Bocanegra	Creative Arts	Fine Arts
Edyta M. Bojanowska	Humanities	European and Latin American Literature
Pia Borg	Creative Arts	Film – Video
Jenny Boully	Creative Arts	General Nonfiction
Mark Philip Bradley	Humanities	Intellectual and Cultural History
Diane Brentari	Humanities	Linguistics
Alice Leora Briggs	Creative Arts	Fine Arts
Taylor Brook	Creative Arts	Music Composition
Lisa Brooks	Social Sciences	Geography and Environmental Studies
Amy Nelson Burnett	Humanities	Intellectual and Cultural History
Sarah Buss	Humanities	Philosophy
Robert Campany	Humanities	Religion
James T. Campbell	Humanities	U.S. History
Suzanne Caporael	Creative Arts	Fine Arts
Hector Carrillo	Social Sciences	Sociology
Oscar Cásares	Creative Arts	Fiction
Anne Cattaneo	Humanities	Theatre Arts
Shu Lea Cheang	Creative Arts	Fine Arts
Liz Cohen	Creative Arts	Photography
Chico Colvard	Creative Arts	Film – Video
Dilip da Cunha	Humanities	Architecture, Planning and Design
Moyra Davey	Creative Arts	Film – Video
Guillermina De Ferrari	Humanities	European and Latin American Literature
Janet Delaney	Creative Arts	Photography
Martin DiCicco	Creative Arts	Film – Video
Michael Dickman	Creative Arts	Poetry
Jennifer Doudna	Natural Sciences	Biochemistry and Molecular Biology
Yaacob Dweck	Humanities	European and Latin American History
David Dyzenhaus	Social Sciences	Law
Dyan Elliott	Humanities	Medieval and Renaissance History
Marti Epstein	Creative Arts	Music Composition
Kate Flint	Humanities	Fine Arts Research
Michael Frank	Creative Arts	General Nonfiction
Ellen Fullman	Creative Arts	Music Composition
Elina Gertsman	Humanities	Fine Arts Research
David Gompper	Creative Arts	Music Composition
Jeff Goodell	Creative Arts	General Nonfiction
Robert Gooding-Williams	Humanities	Philosophy
Alison Gopnik	Social Sciences	Psychology
Eric Gottesman	Creative Arts	Photography
Garth Greenwell	Creative Arts	Fiction
James Grier	Humanities	Music Research
Jonathan Gruber	Social Sciences	Economics
Anna Grzymala-Busse	Social Sciences	Political Science
Tyrell Haberkorn	Humanities	South Asian Studies
Leor Halevi	Humanities	Religion
Janice N. Harrington	Creative Arts	Poetry
David Hertzberg	Creative Arts	Music Composition
Leslie Hewitt	Creative Arts	Fine Arts
Sky Hopinka	Creative Arts	Film – Video
José-Luis Hurtado	Creative Arts	Music Composition
Sabine Iatridou	Humanities	Linguistics
Branden Jacobs-Jenkins	Creative Arts	Drama and Performance Art
Patrick Jagoda	Humanities	Film and Video
Christopher Jarzynski	Natural Sciences	Physics
Steffani Jemison	Creative Arts	Fine Arts
Lacy M. Johnson	Creative Arts	General Nonfiction
Olivia Judson	Natural Sciences	Science Writing
Susan Juster	Humanities	U.S. History
Benjamin Kahan	Humanities	Literary Criticism
Vera Keller	Humanities	Intellectual and Cultural History
Alex Ketley	Creative Arts	Choreography
Osman Khan	Creative Arts	Fine Arts
Stacy Kranitz	Creative Arts	Photography
Gabrielle Lamb	Creative Arts	Choreography
Penny Lane	Creative Arts	Film – Video
Zun Lee	Creative Arts	Photography
Zoe Leonard	Creative Arts	Photography
Ellen Lesperance	Creative Arts	Fine Arts
Mark LeVine	Humanities	Music Research
Yiyun Li	Creative Arts	Fiction
Ada Limón	Creative Arts	Poetry
Ethan Lipton	Creative Arts	Drama and Performance Art
Steve Locke	Creative Arts	Fine Arts
Valeria Luiselli	Creative Arts	Fiction
Alexandre Lunsqui	Creative Arts	Music Composition
Andrej Lupták	Natural Sciences	Biochemistry and Molecular Biology
Jian Ma	Natural Sciences	Computer Science
Frank Magilligan	Social Sciences	Geography and Environmental Studies
Christian Marois	Natural Sciences	Astronomy and Astrophysics
Žibuoklė Martinaitytė	Creative Arts	Music Composition
Jenny McPhee	Humanities	Translation
Rebecca Mead	Creative Arts	General Nonfiction
Raymond Meeks	Creative Arts	Photography
Philip Metres	Creative Arts	Poetry
Bernadette Meyler	Social Sciences	Constitutional Studies
Robert Millis	Creative Arts	Music Composition
Helen Mirra	Creative Arts	Fine Arts
Gordon Ennis Moore	Creative Arts	Fine Arts
Cyrilla Mozenter	Creative Arts	Fine Arts
Shaylih Muehlmann	Social Sciences	Anthropology and Cultural Studies
Joan R. Najita	Natural Sciences	Astronomy and Astrophysics
Angel Nevarez	Creative Arts	Fine Arts
Aimee Nezhukumatathil	Creative Arts	Poetry
Celeste Ng	Creative Arts	Fiction
Sigrid Nunez	Creative Arts	Fiction
Lisa Olstein	Creative Arts	Poetry
Chris Otter	Humanities	History of Science, Technology and Economics
Clifford Owens	Creative Arts	Fine Arts
Josh Pacewicz	Social Sciences	Sociology
Sarah Parcak	Social Sciences	Anthropology and Cultural Studies
Jennifer Pastor	Creative Arts	Fine Arts
H. Glenn Penny	Humanities	European and Latin American History
Nathaniel Persily	Social Sciences	Law
Helen Phillips	Creative Arts	Fiction
Kim Phillips-Fein	Humanities	U.S. History
David A. Pietz	Humanities	East Asian Studies
Shamel Pitts	Creative Arts	Choreography
Robert Léopold Polidori	Creative Arts	Photography
Jana Prikryl	Creative Arts	Poetry
Tahera Qutbuddin	Humanities	Near Eastern Studies
Kavita Ramanan	Natural Sciences	Applied Mathematics
Eric Rebillard	Humanities	Classics
Camille Robcis	Humanities	Intellectual and Cultural History
Linda Foard Roberts	Creative Arts	Photography
Alexander Rose	Creative Arts	General Nonfiction
Lawrence Rosenwald	Humanities	Literary Criticism
Tina Satter	Creative Arts	Drama and Performance Art
Rebecca Saxe	Natural Sciences	Neuroscience
Susanna Schellenberg	Humanities	Philosophy
Katy Schimert	Creative Arts	Fine Arts
Erica Schoenberger	Humanities	History of Science, Technology and Economics
Bryan Schutmaat	Creative Arts	Photography
Melissa Schwartzberg	Social Sciences	Political Science
Jeffrey Sconce	Humanities	Film and Video
David Sepkoski	Humanities	History of Science, Technology and Economics
Diane Seuss	Creative Arts	Poetry
Yevgeniy Sharlat	Creative Arts	Music Composition
Mukul Sharma	Natural Sciences	Earth Science
Pradeep Sharma	Natural Sciences	Engineering
Lesley A. Sharp	Social Sciences	Anthropology and Cultural Studies
Elaine McMillion Sheldon	Creative Arts	Film – Video
Anna Shternshis	Humanities	European and Latin American History
Danna Singer	Creative Arts	Photography
Daniel Jordan Smith	Humanities	African Studies
Rachel Louise Snyder	Creative Arts	General Nonfiction
Helen Solterer	Humanities	Medieval and Renaissance Literature
Cammie Staros	Creative Arts	Fine Arts
Susan Steinberg	Creative Arts	Fiction
A.L. Steiner	Creative Arts	Film – Video
Douglas W. Stephan	Natural Sciences	Chemistry
Andrew Strominger	Natural Sciences	Physics
Lloyd Suh	Creative Arts	Drama and Performance Art
Catherine Sullivan	Creative Arts	Film – Video
Barbara Takenaga	Creative Arts	Fine Arts
Brian Teare	Creative Arts	Poetry
Valerie Tevere	Creative Arts	Fine Arts
Michael J. Therien	Natural Sciences	Chemistry
Larry Towell	Creative Arts	Photography
Tracy Droz Tragos	Creative Arts	Film – Video
Patricia Treib	Creative Arts	Fine Arts
Victoria-Idongesit Udondian	Creative Arts	Fine Arts
Rick Valelly	Social Sciences	Political Science
Peter van Agtmael	Creative Arts	Photography
Chris E. Vargas	Creative Arts	Fine Arts
Shannon Walsh	Creative Arts	Film – Video
Stephanie Wang-Breal	Creative Arts	Film – Video
Heghnar Zeitlian Watenpaugh	Humanities	Fine Arts Research
Caroline Weber	Creative Arts	Biography
Martin H. Weissman	Natural Sciences	Mathematics
Noah Whiteman	Natural Sciences	Biochemistry and Molecular Biology
Amy Wilentz	Creative Arts	General Nonfiction
Emily Wilson	Humanities	Translation
Pamela Wojcik	Humanities	Film and Video
Donald Reid Womack	Creative Arts	Music Composition
Maya Milenovic Workman	Creative Arts	Music Composition
Reggie Workman	Creative Arts	Music Composition
Ben Yagoda	Creative Arts	Biography
Muhammad Hamid Zaman	Natural Sciences	Medicine and Health
