= Richard Bensel =

American political scientist (born 1949)

- Born: Richard Franklin Bensel; November 13, 1949 (age 76); Pendleton, Oregon, U.S.
- Education: University of Chicago (BA); Cornell University (MA, PhD)
- Occupations: Political scientist, professor
- Scientific career
- Fields: Political science

Richard Franklin Bensel (born November 13, 1949) is a professor of American politics at Cornell University. Bensel has attempted to bridge the gap between American economic and political history, with an eye toward comparative implications. Bensel is best known as a scholar of political economy.

== Life ==
Born on November 13, 1949, in Pendleton, Oregon. He received his Bachelor of Arts degree from the University of Chicago in 1971; his Master of Arts degree from Cornell University in 1975; and his Ph.D. from Cornell University in 1978. He served as an assistant professor at Texas A&M University from 1977 to 1982. He served as an assistant professor at the University of Texas at Dallas from 1982 to 1984. He served as an associate professor at the New School for Social Research in New York from 1984 to 1988, and as a professor from 1988 to 1993. He has been a professor at Cornell University since 1993.

== Academics ==
Along with Stephen Skowronek, Theda Skocpol and others, Bensel is among the founders of the academic study of American political development (APD), a sub-specialty within the discipline of political science. Beginning during the 1970s and 80s as an attempt to "bring the state back in" to the study of American Politics, APD soon emerged as a competitor to the prevailing rational choice and survey research modes of studying American politics. In an important 2003 exchange published in Studies in American Political Development, John Gerring, Stephen Skowronek, Rogers Smith, and Bensel offered their thoughts on the state of APD as a subfield. Bensel controversially defined APD as "an insurgency." Its goal, he argued, "should be to destroy disciplinary boundaries, to sabotage reifying conventions, to identify and support intellectual rebellions wherever they appear, and to do our best to make sense of whatever space we may have cleared and claimed for ourselves."

His recent work, Passions and Preferences: William Jennings Bryan and the 1896 Democratic National Convention (Cambridge University Press, 2008), attempts to bring American political development into a conversation with rational choice theory.

== Books ==
- Sectionalism and American Political Development (1984)
- Yankee Leviathan: The Origins of Central State Authority in America, 1859–1877 (1991)
- The Political Economy of American Industrialization (2000)
- The American Ballot Box in the Mid-Nineteenth Century (2004)
- Passions and Preferences: William Jennings Bryan and the 1896 Democratic National Convention (2008)
