= Jeffrey K. Tulis =

American Political Scientist

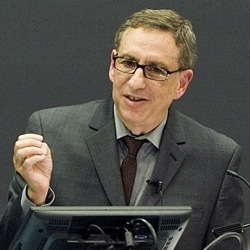
Jeffrey Tulis delivering the Walter F. Murphy Lecture at Princeton University in 2011.

Jeffrey K. Tulis (born 1950) is an American political scientist known for work that conjoins the fields of American politics, political theory, and public law.

== Early life and education ==
Tulis was born in Long Branch, New Jersey and grew up on the Jersey Shore in the Oakhurst section of Ocean Township, Monmouth County, New Jersey. He spent his high school years at the New Hampton School, a boarding school in New Hampshire. He attended Bates College where he received a B.A. in 1972, Magna Cum Laude and was elected to Phi Beta Kappa. He spent his junior year abroad at Harris Manchester College, Oxford. He earned an M.A. in political science from Brown University in 1974 and a Ph.D. in political science from the University of Chicago in 1982, where he studied with Herbert J. Storing.

== Career ==
Tulis taught at University of Notre Dame and Princeton University before joining the senior faculty of the University of Texas at Austin in 1988, where he is now Professor Emeritus. At Texas, his primary appointment was Professor of Government. He also held secondary appointments as Professor of Law, and Professor of Communication Studies. He has held visiting appointments as a Liberal Arts Fellow at Harvard Law School, a Laurence S. Rockefeller Visiting Fellow at Princeton, and as a Dahrendorf Visiting Senior Fellow at the London School of Economics.

Tulis is a leading figure among the generation of scholars who revived the studies of history, of law, of constitutional studies, and of political thought in the American politics subfield of political science. For these efforts, he was elected the inaugural President of the Politics and History Section of the American Political Science Association in 1990-91. He was a founding co-editor of the Johns Hopkins Series in Constitutional Thought and later the Constitutional Thinking series at University Press of Kansas.

He is an author or editor of five books, most notably, The Rhetorical Presidency and (with Nicole Mellow) Legacies of Losing in American Politics., and more than seventy articles and essays.

The Rhetorical Presidency has been very influential in political science and unusually impactful in American political culture. It was the subject of numerous academic symposia and conferences that produced four volumes of collected essays, and a special double issue of the journal, Critical Review, where the editor describes this book as “one of the two or three most important and perceptive works written by a political scientist in the twentieth century.” It was the subject of an editorial in The New York Times and of essays by leading public intellectuals including George F. Will, Joan Didion, Walter Berns and Jill Lepore. Originally published in 1987, a new edition with an extended Afterword was published in 2017 in the Princeton Classics collection. It was awarded a Legacy Award from the American Political Science Association in 2018 and the Sesquicentennial Prize for distinguished academic, artistic, or scientific achievement from Bates College in 2022.

Legacies of Losing in American Politics was the subject of several book panels at political science conferences and of two review symposia: in the LSE American Politics and Policy Blog and in Political Theory (journal) in December 2020.

Since 2015, in response to what he characterizes as an anti-constitutional turn in American politics marked by the rise of Trump and Trumpism, Tulis has engaged American politics with public facing essays in The Washington Post; The Atlantic; The Bulwark; Public Seminar; the LSE American Politics and Policy Blog and The Constitutionalist.

== Personal life ==
He is married to Jean Ehrenberg, a psychologist. They have two daughters.
