= Political posturing =

Political appeals to emotion

Political posturing, also known as political grandstanding (from the notion of performing to crowds in the grandstands), political theatre, or "kabuki", is the use of speech or actions to gain political support through emotional or affective appeals. It applies especially to appeals that are seen as hollow or lacking political or economic substance, or to superficial appeals that may not reflect a person's genuine ideology or political preferences.

== Description ==
Politics involves, among other aspects, the use of communication to reconcile differences, persuade fellow citizens, and reach decisions about governing or social order. While public speaking and other forms of communication are thus a part of political activity, speaking that is regarded as shallowly signalling positions without substantively affecting policy or government structures is often criticized.

News media may encourage or contribute to political posturing or grandstanding by presenting politicians' speeches or other performances to their constituents. Elected politicians appear to use speeches not directly related to legislation as an opportunity to present a preferred image. For example, one study of the United States Congress found that the length of sessions has increased since the introduction of live television coverage. The speeches broadcast include what the study authors call "persuasive advertising campaigns to win the production contract from [politicians'] constituencies."

Posturing may be seen not only in political rhetoric but also in legislative, law enforcement, or other official actions undertaken not on the basis of their effectiveness, but in order to reduce or deflect criticism aimed at public officials. It is common for people to react emotionally rather than rationally to crisis or controversy. In response, political actors may undertake visible yet superficial actions, as these are relatively easy to understand or to see, and they may satisfy emotional responses such as anger or fear more quickly than would be necessary for in-depth substantive responses. If a political actor can take credit for quick response, and if more effective responses are less likely to gain support in the short-term, there may be pressure in favor of political posturing.

Justin Tosi and Brandon Warmke use the term "moral grandstanding" to describe similar behavior where people exaggerate emotions and opinions in a public forum in order to gain social status, especially among people who agree with them. This can also involve public shaming, abandonment of nuance and context, and a mob mentality of trumped-up charges and excessive outrage. Jonathan Haidt and Tobias Rose-Stockwell note this happens on social media.

== Potential harm ==
In representative political systems, elected leaders may be pressured to take highly visible action in order to appeal to voters or influence public opinion in their favor. Concern for reelection or popularity may cause political leaders to act in ways that available information or prevailing political ideology suggest are not the best course of action. Such political posturing may have short-term positive value for individual politicians, but negative consequences for society in the medium- or long term. Various political structures, such as separation of powers or judicial review may be put in place to ameliorate the harm of political posturing. In some cases, however, such structures may allow for more political posturing by protecting politicians from potential negative consequences.

In a related way, elected representatives may use speeches, committee votes, or other political action to promote themselves to constituents or to interest groups such as lobbyists or political donors, sometimes in ways that harm the process of governing.

== Kabuki ==
Kabuki is a term used by American political pundits as a synonym for political posturing. It acquired this derogatory meaning after drawn out peace-time treaty negotiations between the United States and Japan which had extended to 1960, and because Japan, in an effort "to shed its image as a global marauder" sent kabuki theater tours to the U.S. after World War II to sow the seeds of goodwill. It first appeared in print in 1961 in the Los Angeles Times in an article written by Henry J. Taylor. In the United Kingdom, analysts and commentators may refer to a similar phenomenon as political theatre.

In common English usage, a kabuki dance, also a kabuki play, is an activity or drama carried out in real life in a predictable or stylized fashion, reminiscent of the kabuki style of Japanese stage play. It refers to an event that is designed to create the appearance of conflict or of an uncertain outcome, when in fact the actors have worked together to determine the outcome beforehand. For example, Tom Brokaw used the term to describe U.S. Democratic party and U.S. Republican party political conventions, which purport to be competitive contests to nominate presidential candidates, yet in reality the nominees are known well beforehand.

The phrase continues to appear in mass media: for example (2009) in a Wall Street Journal article on the Supreme Court nomination hearing of Justice Sonia Sotomayor. In 2011 Representative Rosa DeLauro, a Democratic member of the U.S. House of Representatives from Connecticut, was reported as using the term to refer to the Republican Party effort to repeal the 2010 health-care reform act, telling reporters, "It's a kabuki dance. The fact of the matter is we're not going to repeal it."

== Covert political statement ==
In situations where free expression or access to public space are limited, as by authoritarian governments or other oppressive forces, political posturing may take covert forms, such as religious or artistic expressions. In some settings where government authorities suppress political action, the Church or other religious institutions provide an alternative site for people to express displeasure with their society, for example by decrying evil rather than overtly challenging state authorities. Similarly, political drama or other highly politicized art can serve either to protest against, or to spread ideas in support of political positions or authorities. The use of such covert messaging is sometimes regarded negatively, as manipulative propaganda, but may also be regarded as neutral or positive.

== See also ==
- Dog whistle (politics)
- Influence of mass media
- Moral high ground
- Political campaign
- Politico-media complex
- Social media use in politics
