= Perkis =

Perkis is a surname. Notable people with the surname include:

- Philip Perkis (1935–2025), American photographer
- Tim Perkis (fl. 1989), American musician

== Fictional ==
- Tony Perkis, character from the 1995 film Heavyweights
