= Henry J. Taylor =

American author, economist

- Born: Henry Junior Taylor; September 2, 1902; Chicago, Illinois, U.S.
- Died: February 24, 1984 (aged 81); Manhattan, New York City, U.S.
- Education: University of Virginia
- Occupations: Author; journalist; broadcaster; diplomat
- Known for: U.S. Ambassador to Switzerland

Henry Junior Taylor (September 2, 1902 – February 24, 1984) was an American author, economist, radio broadcaster and former United States Ambassador to Switzerland (1957–1961).

Taylor was born in Chicago to Henry Noble and Eileen O'Hare Taylor. He graduated from the Lawrenceville School in 1920 and the University of Virginia in 1924. He served as a foreign correspondent for the Scripps-Howard newspaper chain in the early years of World War II. After the war, Taylor hosted the General Motors-sponsored radio program Your Land and Mine, on which he was known for his conservative commentary. Taylor was a columnist for the United Feature Syndicate after serving as Ambassador. He authored several nonfiction books, including An American Speaks His Mind and It Must Be a Long War, and a novel, The Big Man.

In 1959 an anonymous source identifying themselves as 'Sniper' wrote a series of letters to Taylor, as American Ambassador to Switzerland. These revealed much useful intelligence and would be regarded as the British Security Service's 'finest post-war investigation'. This included the arrest of Swedish Air Force Colonel Stig Wennerström, as a spy for the Soviet Union. In December 1960, 'Sniper' was revealed as the Polish Military Intelligence officer Michał Goleniewski, who then defected to the US.

He won a Human Interest Storytelling Ernie Pyle Award in 1959 from the Scripps Howard Foundation. He is credited with introducing kabuki as a term used by American political pundits as a synonym for political posturing.

Taylor died at his home in Manhattan at the age of 81.
