= SAPD =

SAPD may refer to:

- Sadistic personality disorder
- San Antonio Police Department
- Socialist Workers' Party of Germany
- Studies in American Political Development
