= Yankee Leviathan =

Nonfiction book by Richard Bensel

Yankee Leviathan: The Origins of Central State Authority in America, 1859–1877 (usually shortened to Yankee Leviathan) is a book written by Richard Bensel published by Cambridge University Press in 1991. In the book, Bensel undertakes an analysis of the causes of the American Civil War and the failed policies of Reconstruction to construct an argument about the rise of the American national state. The book is a contribution to scholarship on American Political Development and political and economic modernization.

== Synopsis ==
=== Causes of the American Civil War ===
Bensel argues that the attractiveness of secession for Southerners rested on a threefold calculation. First, the Republican Party won both the presidency in the election of Abraham Lincoln and a plurality in the House of Representatives at the 36th Congress. The Republicans represented a credible threat to the continued dominance of slavery in the national political economy, particularly when it came to the question of slavery in the western territories and the Lecompton Constitution. Second, secession would be a relatively easy process, with little disruption of state activity and no serious threat of social unrest from Southern whites. Third, secession would be increasingly difficult as the southern economy was increasingly bound up with and subordinated to the industrial northern economy. For this reason, it was seen as better to secede earlier rather than later.

Given the attractiveness of secession for the South, Bensel argues that civil war became unavoidable for three reasons. First, there was an absence of constraints on the further radicalization of the Republican Party on the question of slavery. Radical Republicans could justify federal intervention on the grounds that the extinction of slavery was inevitable anyway, and moderate Republicans could justify restraint on the same grounds, but the fundamental agreement over the point, along with persistent pressure from the abolitionist base of the party gave the radical position an advantage. Second, the compromise measures proposed by the South were largely self-defeating. Bensel supports this point with an extended discussion of the contest for the Speaker of the House of the 36th Congress, in which John Sherman, the Republican candidate, was blocked for two months by Southern opposition and which concluded with the eventual election of William Pennington. Third, the threat of further fragmentation of the northern part of the country motivated federal intervention to prevent secession. Only New England was firmly Unionist in response to the secession of the south; the Midwest and other parts of the Northeast had more ambivalent responses to secession.

Bensel argues that all of this precipitated a secession crisis in which the federal government completely lost control over its southern installations. The context of a lack of a substantial federal statist bureaucracy capable of handling the crisis meant that the only way to regain federal control was military intervention.

=== Comparison of Union and Confederate states ===
Secession and the subsequent war mobilization rendered the central state apparatuses of both the Union and the Confederacy substantially stronger than at any point in the antebellum United States.

In a comparison of the two states regarding their relative sizes, and their relationships to their respective economic and social bases, Bensel argues that the Confederacy was, in many respects, much more statist and modern than the Union.

==== Theoretical framework ====
Bensel undertakes the analysis of the two states in a framework which distinguishes between the structural design of the state and the substantive content of its policies. Structural design refers to the skeletal form of organization of the state apparatuses themselves, while substantive content refers to the actions of the state. In total, Bensel investigates forty-two different policy areas under this framework.

===== Structural design =====
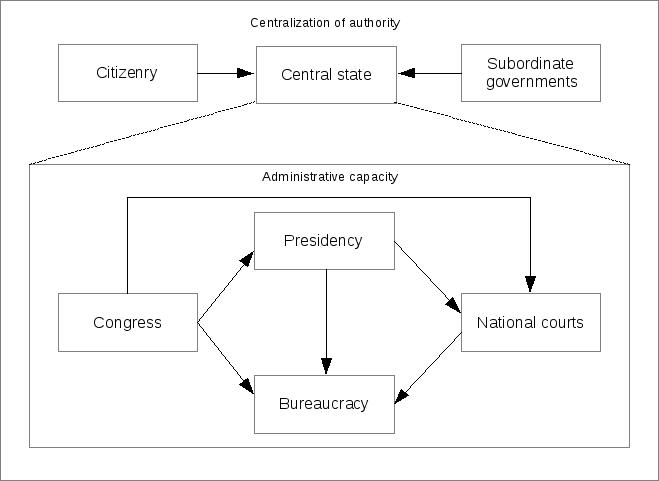
Dimensions of structural design of states

There are two dimensions of structural design: centralization of authority and administrative capacity. Centralization of authority refers to measures which concentrate decision-making power in any of the central state institutions, while administrative capacity concerns the distribution of decision-making power between the central state institutions themselves.

The state has a higher degree of centralized authority to the extent that it is able to shift discretion to itself from subordinate governments such as states, counties, and municipalities; and also to the extent that it encroaches on the private sphere and civil society.

The state has higher administrative capacity the more decision-making power is concentrated in central state institutions insulated from political, partisan, and popular influence. Bensel roughly ranks these institutions' adherence to statist principles in descending order as follows: state bureaucracy, national courts, presidency, congress.

===== Substantive content =====
Bensel investigates five dimensions of substantive state-building policies:

1. Citizenship - includes policies relating to non-property related rights and duties of individual citizens and their relationship with the central state.
2. Property rights - includes policies related to central state control over the use and ownership of property.
3. Client-group formation - includes policies which create a relation of dependency between individuals and the central state; examples include pensions, civil service salaries, and any other bond which creates for the client an interest in the future strength of the central state.
4. Extraction - includes policies, primarily taxation, which enable continued state operation by reallocating private wealth into the state treasury.
5. Involvement in the world-system - concerns policies affecting relations with other sovereign states.

==== Analysis ====
Bensel argues that the Confederacy far outpaced the Union in some of the most important dimensions of state building. This was especially true with respect to administrative capacity, citizenship and property rights. The Confederate state enjoyed more effective concentration of decision-making power in the office of the Presidency and a Congress more effectively shielded from popular pressure on account of meeting in secret session. The Confederacy had near-complete control over the southern economy; they controlled the allocation of manpower via conscription policies and the allocation of raw materials through military impressment of the railways. Confiscation of private property and the establishment of price controls were also features of the Confederate war mobilization effort.

The Union state was much less modernized by comparison. The secession of the South led to a Republican party-state in the North which encouraged a high degree of patronage and clientelism, and sacrificed rational-bureaucratic considerations to more purely political ones. The Union did not approach a command of its economy comparable to the Confederacy; instead, they depended almost solely on voluntary, open-market contracts with private persons and corporations for meeting the requirements of the war effort. Instead, the most important domestic aspect of the Union state-building process was the nationalization of the currency in the form of the greenback and the creation of a national banking system. The latter policies, along with the massive expansion of national debt, rendered financial capitalists a client group of the central state.

In all, the comparison shows that, with respect to their own respective political economies, the Confederacy was a more modern state despite its material and economic backwardness relative to the Union. Bensel argues that this observation suggests a much looser relationship between political and economic modernization than had been assumed by many social scientists and theorists of modernization (e.g., Barrington Moore, Jr., Walt Whitman Rostow).

=== Causes for failure of Reconstruction ===
Bensel argues that the state-building trajectory taken by the Union during the Civil War had a highly self-limiting character. Specifically, the formation of a finance capitalist client group in the context of a one-party state characterized by a lack of rational-bureaucratic capacity undermined the central state's ability to meaningfully pursue the massive state-enhancing opportunity represented by Reconstruction.

The US Treasury became enormously important for the regulation of the money supply in the economy after the establishment of the national banking system, the nationalization of the currency and the related issuance of greenbacks, and the temporary abolition of the gold standard. The incompetency of the Treasury was a constant preoccupation of finance capital, indicated by the financial press at the time. The preoccupation was well-founded: incompetency and mismanagement were common; positions in the Treasury were especially susceptible to purely political appointments and the distribution of patronage; and the Treasury secretary was selected on the basis of willingness to prioritize the organizational needs of the Republican Party over other concerns.

Finance capitalists' primary interest was in the overall stability of the financial system. This interest militated against continued Reconstruction for several reasons.

- The potential for monetary instability as a result of Treasury incompetence made finance capitalists skeptical of state intervention in the economy. Finance capitalists supported a return to the gold standard, which would re-expose the United States economy to international influence, especially the British sterling, widely seen as more trustworthy and stable than US Treasury regulation. Finance capitalists' general suspicion toward the central state also meant they opposed practically every measure that would increase state revenue and supported tax reductions. A permanent military occupation of the South by federal troops would be extremely expensive, and would require increased extraction from the private economy, a slower return to the gold standard, and impeded the stabilization of the national debt.
- Reconstruction threatened to continue the disruption of cotton production. Because most cotton exported for the international market went through Northeastern ports, Northern financiers had a strong interest in uninterrupted cotton production.
- Supporters of Radical Reconstruction (notably, a Reconstruction bill sponsored by Radical Republican Thaddeus Stevens) aimed to enact a highly redistributive program for the South in order to create an economically independent base for the Republican Party. Under such a program, on the basis of loyalty to the Union, Freedmen and poor yeomen Southern white Unionists would receive wealth directly confiscated from Southern separatists. This had the potential to transform a race-based cleavage between Blacks and Whites into a class-based cleavage between poor farmers and landholding elites. At this point, it was difficult to see how this conflict could be contained in the South. Northern labor would almost certainly begin to make demands for eligibility in the transfer of Southern wealth to the lower classes, since they had remained loyal to the Union as well. This was an unattractive option for Northern capitalist members of the Republican coalition, both because of the disruptive effect on Southern agricultural production and the potential for an increase in generalized class conflict.

Bensel shows that Republican politicians representing banking districts voted closely in line with the interests of finance capital; a large part of the Republican coalition was thereby put against the project of Reconstruction and the state-enhancing measures that would have come with it, while other Northern sections of the Republican Party did not have deep enough interests in Reconstruction to constitute a veto over the influence of finance capitalists. In other words, the client-group formation path of state-building had a strong self-limiting character, wherein further state-building was stymied by this client group.

== See also ==
- Patriotic Gore
- War of the Rebellion Atlas
- Bibliography of the American Civil War
