= Stig Wennerström =

Stig Wennerström may refer to:

- Stig Wennerström (colonel) (1906–2006), colonel in the Swedish Air Force who was convicted of espionage in 1964
- Stig Wennerström (sailor) (born 1943), Swedish sailor
