= Josh Pacewicz =

American sociologist

- Born: April 11, 1980 (age 46); Warsaw, Poland
- Occupations: Associate Professor of Sociology and Urban Studies

Academic background
- Education: University of Chicago

Academic work
- Discipline: Sociology
- Institutions: Brown University
- Website: https://vivo.brown.edu/display/jpacewic

Josh Pacewicz is an American sociologist, who is an Associate Professor of Sociology and Urban Studies at Brown University and a 2020 Guggenheim Fellow. His research interests are in the areas of political sociology, historical sociology, urban sociology, the sociology of law, and American political development.

== Education and career ==
Pacewicz holds a bachelor’s degree from The University of Texas-Austin, Plan II Honors program. He graduated from the University of Chicago with a Ph.D in Sociology in 2010. His dissertation was supervised by Andrew Abbott, Elisabeth Clemens, Andreas Glaeser, and Susan Gal.

From 2010 to 2012, Pacewicz was an ASA Postdoctoral Fellow on the Current Economic Crisis at Stanford University, under the supervision of Mark Granovetter. He joined the faculty at Brown University in 2012.

== Research Areas and Books ==
Pacewicz’s research focuses on American statecraft and subnational governance, especially the interplay between federal policy and party politics, municipal finance, political advocacy and expertise, and more generally the democratic process. His research relies primarily on interviews with legislators, state agency employees, municipal officials, and other policy workers. Pacewicz has written about qualitative case selection and comparison, and he is the author of two books about American political development and federalism.

In his 2016 book Partisans and Partners: The Politics of the post-Keynesian Society, Pacewicz examines municipal and partisan politics in two Rust Belt cities during the 2008 and 2012 election cycles. The book shows how changes in American federalism—the corporate merger waves that followed 1970s-era financial deregulation and changes in the prevailing logics of inter-governmental finance—eroded the traditional base of both political parties, thus creating an opening for activists to take over grassroots politics, especially within the GOP. Partisans and Partners was a co-winner of the American Sociological Association’s Theory prize.

His 2027 book, Divided States: Doing Federalism in Red and Blue America, centers officials who interpret and administer federal rights and programs in the states and documents their ongoing efforts to make real the promises of flagship social programs and civil rights guarantees. In Republican states, this resulted in policies that were less extreme than legislators' frontstage rhetoric, but also contributed to an extremist and antidemocratic reorientation among Republicans, who used the architecture of state government to decouple legislative initiatives from their street-level consequences.

== Awards ==
Pacewicz's articles have received prizes from the American Sociological Association's Historical-Comparative Section (2016) and Community and Urban Sociology Section (2015 and 2021). He has won an award from the Society for the Advancement of Socio-Economics (SASE) and was a 2020 Guggenheim Fellow.
