= Gabrielle Lamb =

American dancer and choreographer

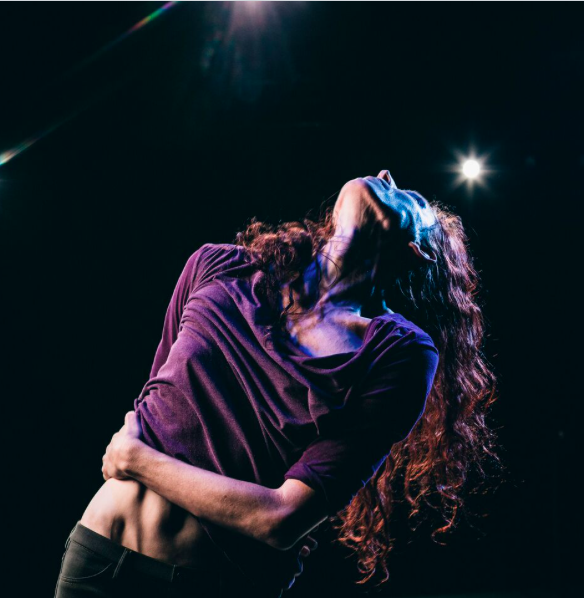
- Gabrielle Lamb during Pigeonwing performance
- Born: Savannah, Georgia
- Occupations: dancer, choreographer, and company director

Gabrielle Lamb is a dancer, choreographer, and company director. In 2020, she was awarded a Guggenheim Fellowship.

== Career ==
She was trained at the Pittsburgh Ballet Theatre School and the Boston Ballet School before joining Les Grands Ballets Canadiens in 2000, where she was promoted to soloist two years later. She has also danced for Morphoses under the direction of Christopher Wheeldon. She has danced principal roles in works by George Balanchine, Nacho Duato, Mats Ek, Jiri Kylian, Jean-Christophe Maillot, Ohad Naharin, Peter Quanz and Christopher Wheeldon and has originated leading roles in new ballets by Mauro Bigonzetti and Shen Wei.

Lamb has choreographed for Ballet Memphis, Milwaukee Ballet, Hubbard Street Dance Chicago, Royal Winnipeg Ballet, SALT Contemporary Dance, and BalletX. She is currently the choreographer and director for her company, Pigeonwing. In 2020, she started an outdoor program in collaboration with Guggenheim called "The Carpet Series."

== List of choreographed works ==
2014

HappenStance - Milwaukee Ballet

Dovetail

2015

Glas

I Am A Woman: Moult - Ballet Memphis

2016

Tessellations - The Joffrey Ensemble

Bewilderness - Pigeonwing

== Fellowships and awards ==
2014

Princess Grace Award for Choreography

New York City Center Fellowship

2015

CUNY Dance Initiative Residency

2016

Baruch College Performing Arts Center Residency

Creative Engagement Grant from the Lower Manhattan Cultural Council

2020

Guggenheim Fellowship
