= Philip Perkis =

American photographer (1935–2025)

Philip Perkis (November 12, 1935 – November 21, 2025) was an American photographer and educator. He received a Guggenheim Fellowship and his work is held in the collections of the Art Institute of Chicago, Carnegie Museum of Art, J. Paul Getty Museum, Metropolitan Museum of Art, Museum of Contemporary Art, Los Angeles, and Museum of Fine Arts, Boston.

== Early life and career ==
Perkis was born in Boston, Massachusetts, on November 12, 1935. He studied painting at San Francisco Art Institute.

He took up photography while in the Air Force in 1957. Later, he made half his living doing commercial assignments and printing for other photographers, and the other half teaching—at Pratt Institute in Brooklyn, New York and at the School of Visual Arts in New York City.

Around 1992, Perkis made photographs in Mexico on a Guggenheim Fellowship, resulting in the 2019 book Mexico.

== Personal life and death ==
Perkis was married to the artist Cyrilla Mozenter. He died on November 21, 2025, at the age of 90.

== Publications ==
=== Books of photography by Perkis ===
- Warwick Mountain Series: Photographs. Atlanta, GA: Nexus, 1978. ISBN 9780932526014.
- The Sadness of Men. New York City: Quantuck Lane, 2008. ISBN 978-1593720346. With a foreword by Alan Klotz, an introduction by Max Kozloff and a transcrpt of an interview between Perkis and John Braverman Levine.
- In a Box Upon the Sea = 바다로 떠나는 상자 속에서 = Pada ro ttŏnanŭn sangja sok esŏ. Seoul, South Korea: Anmoc, 2016. Photographs and anecdotes by Perkis. In English and Korean.
- Mexico. Seoul, South Korea: Anmoc, 2019. ISBN 9788998043155. In English and Korean.
- Notan. anmoc Press. 2025. In English and Korean.

=== Other books by Perkis ===
- Teaching Photography: Notes Assembled. Rochester, NY: OB; RIT Cary Graphic Arts. 2001, ISBN 9781933360706; 2005, ISBN 978-0-9759651-1-5.
- A Single Photography, Twenty Days, Twenty Comments. ISBN 9788998043100. With an introduction by Owen Butler.
- ar. with Cyrilla Mozenter. AC Books. 2023. ISBN 1939901243.
- Octave. with Cyrilla Mozenter. anmoc Press. 2020 Mozenter.

== Films ==
- Just to See – A Mystery: a Film Portrait of Philip Perkis (2015) – 1 h 20 m; documentary directed by Jin Ju Lee

== Exhibitions ==
=== Solo exhibitions ===
- Philip Perkis: Fifty Years of Photographs, Jepson Center for the Arts, Savannah, Georgia, 2010

=== Group exhibitions ===
- Spirit of Mexico: Photographs by Bravo, Levitt and Perkis, Telfair Academy, Savannah, Georgia, 2006. With work by Perkins, Manuel Alvarez Bravo and Helen Levitt.

== Awards ==
- 1991: Guggenheim Fellowship from the John Simon Guggenheim Memorial Foundation for photography

== Collections ==
Perkis' work is held in the following permanent collections:

- Art Institute of Chicago: 8 prints (as of 27 October 2022)
- Carnegie Museum of Art: 6 prints (as of 27 October 2022)
- J. Paul Getty Museum: 2 prints (as of 27 October 2022)
- Metropolitan Museum of Art: 8 prints (as of 27 October 2022)
- Museum of Contemporary Art, Los Angeles: 4 prints (as of 27 October 2022)
- Museum of Fine Arts, Boston: 5 prints (as of 27 October 2022)
