= Sarah Buss =

American philosopher

- Awards: Guggenheim Fellowship, Mellon Fellowship, Phi Beta Kappa, Isabella and George Duncan Fellowship

Education
- Education: Yale University (PhD, BA)

Philosophical work
- Era: 21st-century philosophy
- Region: Western philosophy
- Institutions: University of Michigan, University of Iowa
- Main interests: ethics, action theory

Sarah Buss is an American philosopher and Professor of Philosophy at the University of Michigan. She is known for her works on ethics and action theory. In 2020, she was awarded a Guggenheim Fellowship in Philosophy.

== Books ==
- Rethinking the Value of Humanity, co-edited with Nandi Theunissen (New York: Oxford University Press, 2020)
- The Contours of Agency: Essays on Themes from Harry Frankfurt, co-edited with Lee Overton (Boston: MIT Press, 2001)
