= Philip Klinkner =

Philip A. Klinkner (born May 21, 1963) is an American political scientist, blogger and author. He is noted for his work on American politics, especially political parties and elections, race and American politics, and American political history.

Klinkner is the James S. Sherman Professor of Government at Hamilton College, where he has also served in administrative positions. Originally from Iowa, he graduated from Lake Forest College before attending Yale University for M.A., M.Phil. and Ph.D. degrees in Political Science. In 1990–1991, he was a Research Fellow at the Brookings Institution and he served as a guest scholar there in 1993 and 1995. In 1995, he received the Emerging Scholar Award from the Political Organizations and Parties Section of the American Political Science Association.

In The Unsteady March, Klinkner and Rogers Smith argue America's record of race relations cannot be categorized as consistent, gradual advancement towards equality but rather as a series of dramatic moments where multiple factors aligned to advance or hinder progress. The book won the W.E.B. Du Bois Institute's Horace Mann Bond Book Award and was named as a semifinalist for the 2000 Robert F. Kennedy Book Award.

In 2003, Klinkner founded PolySigh, a blog featuring commentary from a group of political science professors. PolySigh was part of the first generation of academic blogs and its contributors represented a variety of academic institutions, political orientations, and political science sub-fields. He has also blogged at the Huffington Post and The Monkey Cage, another political science blog. He has been an occasional contributor to The Nation and as well as other print, television and online media outlets.

== Books ==
- The Losing Parties: Out-Party National Committees, 1956-1993. 1999. University of Chicago Press. (with Rogers Smith).
- The Unsteady March: The Rise and Decline of Racial Equality in America. 1994. Yale University Press.
- The American Heritage History of the Bill of Rights: The First Amendment. 1991. American Heritage Press. Foreword by Warren Burger.
- The American Heritage History of the Bill of Rights: The Ninth Amendment. 1991. American Heritage (magazine). Foreword by Warren Burger.
