= Lawrie Balfour =

American philosopher

- Awards: Guggenheim Fellowship

Philosophical work
- Era: 21st-century philosophy
- Region: Western philosophy
- Institutions: University of Virginia
- Main interests: ethics, political philosophy

Lawrie Balfour is an American philosopher and James Hart Professor of Politics at the University of Virginia. She is known for her works on political theory.

Balfour was the Editor of Political Theory: An International Journal of Political Philosophy between 2017 and 2021. In 2020, she was awarded a Guggenheim Fellowship in American Literature.

== Books ==
- Toni Morrison: Imagining Freedom, Oxford University Press, 2023
- Democracy's Reconstruction: Thinking Politically with W.E.B. Du Bois, Oxford University Press, 2011
- The Evidence of Things Not Said: James Baldwin and the Promise of American Democracy, Cornell University Press, 2000
