= American political development =

Subfield of political science

American political development (often abbreviated as APD) is a subfield of political science that studies the historical development of politics in the United States. In American political science departments, it is considered a subfield within American politics and is closely linked to historical institutionalism.

Scholarship in American political development focuses on "the causes, nature, and consequences of key transformative periods and central patterns in American political history." Karen Orren and Stephen Skowronek, co-founders of the subfield's flagship journal, define American political development as the study of "durable shifts in governing authority" in the United States. The subfield emerged within American political science in the 1980s, alongside a general renewal of work in historical institutionalism, as an "insurgent movement" that sought to refocus attention on the study of historical American politics and to use such historical study to recast the study of contemporary political phenomena.

APD shares overlaps with the research agendas of comparative politics (particularly comparative historical analysis), historical sociology, and political history. However, scholarship in APD differs from political history in that the former's "primary concerns are analytical, conceptual, and theoretical rather than historical." Methodologically, the subfield tends to use within-case analysis and conduct causes-of-effects research (as opposed to effects-of-causes research).

Major journals in the subfield include the flagship journal Studies in American Political Development, founded in 1986, and The Journal of Political History, founded in 1989. As of 2005, the Politics and History section (founded in 1989) of the American Political Science Association was the eighth-largest in membership out of 35 total sections.

== Major works ==
Some major works in the subfield, as indicated by reading lists for comprehensive exams in graduate schools, are as follows:

- Building an American State (1982) by Stephen Skowronek.
- Alternative Americas: A Reading of Antebellum Political Culture by Anne Norton.
- The Rhetorical Presidency (1987) by Jeffrey K. Tulis.
- Ronald Reagan, The Movie: And Other Episodes in American Political Demonology by Michael Rogin.
- Belated Feudalism : Labor, The Law, And Liberal Development In The United States (1991) by Karen Orren.
- Protecting Soldiers and Mothers (1992) by Theda Skocpol.
- The Politics Presidents Make (1993) by Stephen Skowronek.
- Republic of Signs (1993) by Anne Norton
- Civic Ideals (1997) by Rogers Smith.
- Shifting the Color Line (1998) by Robert C. Lieberman.
- The Roots of Reform (1999) by Elisabeth Sanders.
- The Political Economy of American Industrialization (2000) by Richard Bensel.
- The Forging of Bureaucratic Autonomy (2000) by Daniel Carpenter.
- Disjointed Pluralism (2001) by Eric Schickler.
- The Search for American Political Development (2002) by Karen Orren and Stephen Skowronek.
- The Divided Welfare State (2002) by Jacob Hacker.
- The Minority Rights Revolution (2002) by John Skrentny.
- Hellfire Nation: The Politics of Sin in American History (20030 by James A. Morone
- A Revolution in Favor of Government (2003) by Max M. Edling
- Politics in Time (2004) by Paul Pierson.
- Nature and History in American Political Development (2006) by James Ceaser
- Black and Blue: African Americans, the Labor Movement, and the Decline of the Democratic Party (2007) by Paul Frymer.
- This Is Not A President; Sense, Nonsense, and the American Political Imaginary (2008) by Diane Rubenstein
- The Political Foundations of Judicial Supremacy (2009) by Keith Whittington
- Civil Rights and the Making of the Modern American State (2014) by Megan Ming Francis.
- Legacies of Losing in American Politics (2018) by Jeffrey K. Tulis and Nicole Mellow.
- Rot and Revival: The History of Constitutional Law in American Political Development (2024) by Anthony Michael Kreis.
