= Rhetorical presidency =

Political communication theory

The rhetorical presidency is a political communication theory that describes the communication and government style of U.S. presidents in the twentieth century. This theory describes the transition from a presidency that directed rhetoric toward the United States Congress and other government bodies, to one that addresses rhetoric, policy and ideas directly to the public.

After political scientists introduced this theory in 1981, Jeffrey K. Tulis authored The Rhetorical Presidency in 1987 establishing itself as the first book on the theory. Tulis established three stages in his book how presidential rhetoric evolved throughout the U.S.' history: the "Old Way", the "Middle Way" and the "New Way". Tulis's book sparked much debate over the historical evolution of presidential rhetoric. Presidential rhetoric integrates both verbal and visual rhetoric practices to gather the support of the public.

== History ==
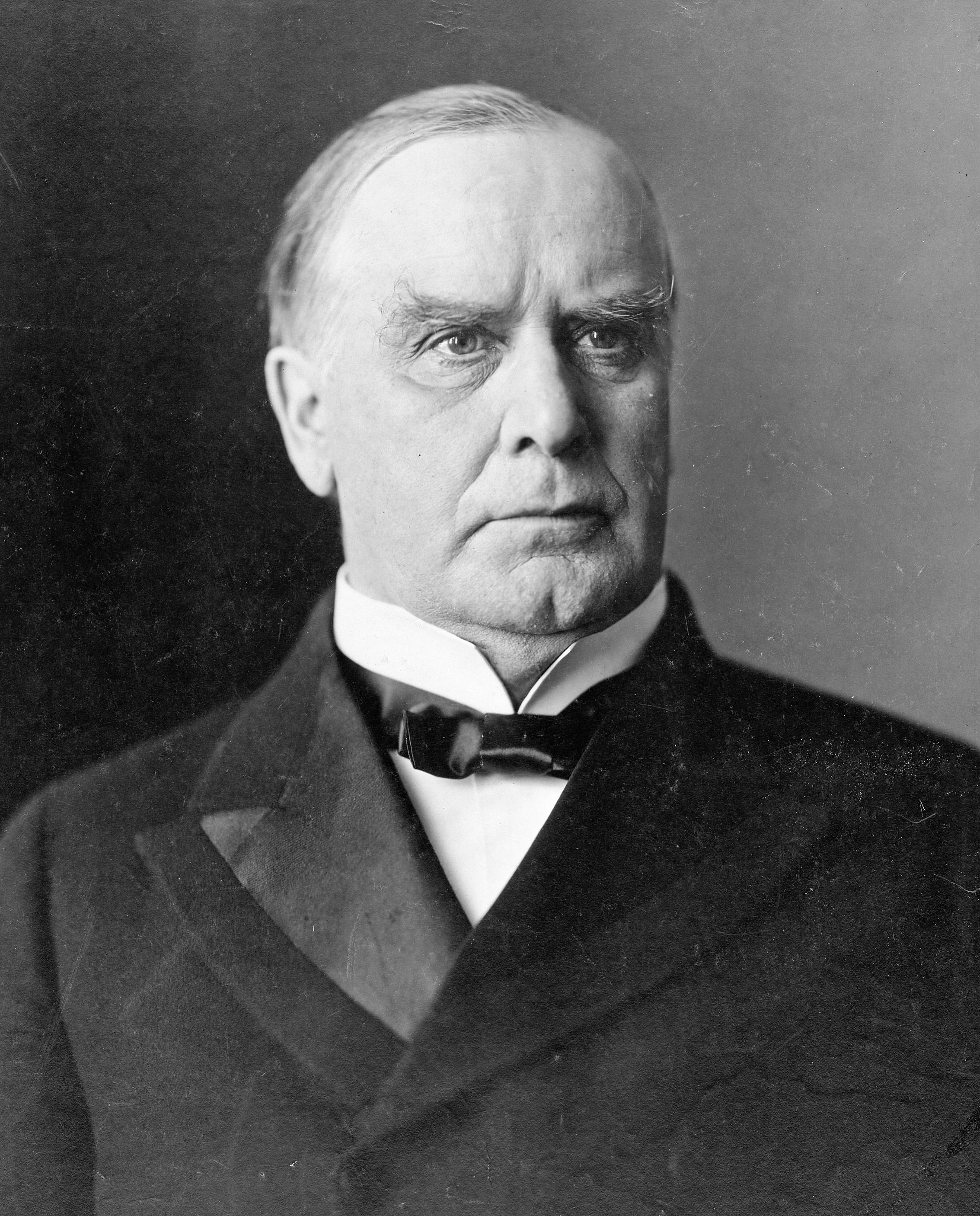
William Mckinley, the president that started the development of the rhetorical presidency.

The development of the rhetorical presidency started in 1898 with William McKinley's (25th U.S. president) fall tour. Other rhetorical presidents include Theodore Roosevelt, Woodrow Wilson, and Franklin Roosevelt.

A few examples of McKinley as a rhetorical president are his speeches following the Spanish-American War around the 1898 midterms. In such speeches, McKinley addressed the electorate on public policy issues.

The president following McKinley's assassination in 1901, Theodore Roosevelt, continued to diverge from the traditional presidency into the rhetorical presidency. A key example of his strategized presidential rhetoric was during the Brownsville Raid in 1906.

The 28th President, Woodrow Wilson helped transform the presidential office. He used his press conferences as a way to garner support from the American public for certain legislation.

Through the use of his fireside chats, Franklin Roosevelt directly addressed the public on policy issues. Starting in 1933, American's tuned in weekly to hear Roosevelt over the radio. He used rhetoric such as "my friends" to informally and emphatically address the public, amidst the Banking Crisis in March 1933.

The term "rhetorical presidency" was introduced by political scientists James Ceaser, Glen E. Thurow, Jeffrey Tulis, and Joseph Bessette in 1981. Tulis wrote the foundational book on the subject entitled The Rhetorical Presidency, in 1987. Tulis' book spurred engaged debate on the history and evolution of presidential rhetoric by many professors and professionals, with Tulis himself later revising positions taken, in his book The Rhetorical Presidency in Retrospect, released in 2007.

By relying less on the traditional methods of communication with Congress, presidents rely more on the approval of the people as a means of governance. Presidents hope the people will put pressure on their members of Congress to side with the president.

The paradigm is typically used to describe presidents pre-Clinton and the "ubiquitous presidency" paradigm has been developed to describe digital age presidencies.

=== Progressive era ===
Many progressive presidential candidates campaigned on the rhetoric of righteousness to motivate their Protestant supporters, especially Theodore Roosevelt, Robert La Follette and William Jennings Bryan. Thus Roosevelt's rhetoric was characterized by an intense moralism of personal righteousness. The tone was typified by his denunciation of "predatory wealth" in a message he sent Congress in January 1908 calling for passage of new labor laws:

Predatory wealth--of the wealth accumulated on a giant scale by all forms of iniquity, ranging from the oppression of wageworkers to unfair and unwholesome methods of crushing out competition, and to defrauding the public by stock jobbing and the manipulation of securities. Certain wealthy men of this stamp, whose conduct should be abhorrent to every man of ordinarily decent conscience, and who commit the hideous wrong of teaching our young men that phenomenal business success must ordinarily be based on dishonesty, have during the last few months made it apparent that they have banded together to work for a reaction. Their endeavor is to overthrow and discredit all who honestly administer the law, to prevent any additional legislation which would check and restrain them, and to secure if possible a freedom from all restraint which will permit every unscrupulous wrongdoer to do what he wishes unchecked provided he has enough money....The methods by which the Standard Oil people and those engaged in the other combinations of which I have spoken above have achieved great fortunes can only be justified by the advocacy of a system of morality which would also justify every form of criminality on the part of a labor union, and every form of violence, corruption, and fraud, from murder to bribery and ballot box stuffing in politics.

== Concepts ==
The rhetorical presidency entails key concepts. First, the president communicates via a mass medium like a national TV or radio broadcast and typically uses national addresses to do so. Second, the president addresses the American audience as a whole with a common purpose during his addresses. Third, the president along with his staff control the message and content that is being presented in the address. Fourth, the president "goes public" with his message in order to sway public opinion on issues and to gain support for his policies.

Since the dawn of the new media of communication, such as radio and television, the president and his staff have utilized them to address the American audience. Along with the president focusing their attention to mass media, mass media also turned their focus to the president and gave the president more media coverage than ever.

Presidents under the rhetorical presidency paradigm commonly speak to the American population by using language that makes them seem as one of "them." The president uses language like, "My fellow Americans" to inflict familiar and comfortable feelings in the audience so they are willing to hear the message the president wants to display.

Presidents seek to control the message and policy they want to put out in the US, so the administrations works to present the message and content in ways that will make the policy more willing to be accepted by the Americans. They alter language, leak information, and send narrow messages so more and more Americans to understand what the president is talking about.

The president will often "go public" with their opinion in order to sway the public into supporting the policy and messages they are promoting. This is done sometimes to go around Congress and the legislative branch who could be at an impasse with the president on opinion and to possibly push them to get pieces of policy through. The rhetorical presidency established the president as campaigner for the electorate's approval and opinion.

== Development ==
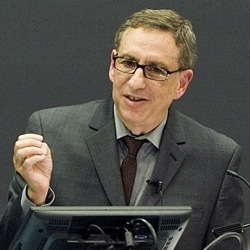
Jeffrey Tulis is one of the founding fathers of The Rhetorical Presidency paradigm and authored The Rhetorical Presidency in 1987.

Tulis argued that changes in the rhetorical style of the presidency were a symptom of a shift in Americans' underlying conceptions regarding how government should function. Rhetorical presidency cut congressional dominion, influenced the power to fit public policy, and put the president in front with the American people to show the development of leadership as an imperative demeanor of presidential character and politics.

The rhetorical presidency is both a structural theory and a theory of how presidents communicate in the media age. It draws from political science, history and communication studies, and primarily results from a modern doctrine of presidential leadership.

Tulis delineates the historical arc of presidential rhetoric in the United States as having three stages: the "Old Way", the "Middle Way" and the "New Way".

The Old Way (1789–1900) corresponds with traditional conventions of statecraft and rhetoric addressed to Congress, the courts or visiting dignitaries. Most presidential rhetoric was delivered in writing. The only attempt during this period to use rhetoric to address the whole people was President Andrew Johnson's Swing Around the Circle, which failed.

The Middle Way (1900–1913) marks a hybrid between internal and external appeals on important matters epitomized by the Presidency of Theodore Roosevelt. He met fierce opposition from his own party in Congress regarding the Hepburn Act, with appeals directly to the people. William McKinley's 1898 speaking tour was an integral part of developing the "Middle Way" that Theodore Roosevelt is mainly credited for.

The New Way (1913–present) refers to a presidency which dispenses with traditional statecraft and instead regularly engages the public. Woodrow Wilson employed two types of rhetoric: the policy speech and the visionary speech. A policy speech explains and defends the president's policy on a certain issue, while the visionary speech articulates a goal for the future and calls the nation towards that goal. Since Wilson, all presidents have emphasized these tools.

== Verbal and visual rhetoric ==
Verbal rhetoric used by presidents is the most common type of presidential rhetoric used. The implication of Woodrow Wilson's policy speeches and visionary speeches laid the groundwork for the following presidents. The use of the State of the Union Address is an example of presidents explaining and defending their own policies to gain the support of the public directly. Franklin Roosevelt's fireside chats are another example of the rhetorical presidency. They used verbal rhetoric to directly address the electorate and to garner support from the public for partisan policies and issues.

Using visual images, text and video to influence or persuade an audience is how presidents utilize visual rhetoric in their own presidential rhetoric. The increasing growth of the mass media has increased the value of visual rhetoric in helping create a positive political image with the people.
