= Kavita Ramanan =

Probability theorist

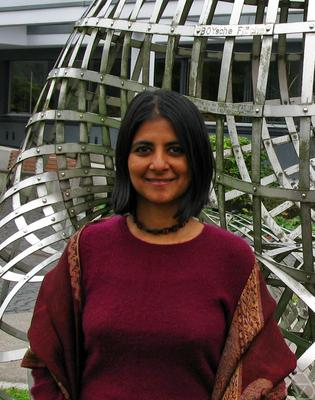
- Born: Chennai, Tamil Nadu, India

Academic background
- Education: IIT Bombay; Brown University
- Doctoral advisor: Paul Dupuis

Kavita Ramanan is a probability theorist who works as a professor of applied mathematics at Brown University.

== Education and career ==
Ramanan was born in Chennai, Tamil Nadu, India to Anuradha Ramanan and algebraic geometer S. Ramanan. Ramanan earned a bachelor's degree in chemical engineering at the Indian Institute of Technology Bombay in 1992. She completed her Ph.D. in applied mathematics at Brown University in 1996. Her dissertation, supervised by Paul Dupuis, was Construction and Large Deviation Analysis of Constrained Processes, with Applications to Communication Networks.

After postdoctoral studies at the Technion, she worked at Bell Labs from 1997 to 2002, and as a faculty member in mathematical sciences at Carnegie Mellon University from 2002 to 2009. She returned to Brown as a faculty member in 2010.

== Recognition ==
Ramanan won the Erlang Prize of the Applied Probability Society of INFORMS in 2006. She was elected as a fellow of the Institute of Mathematical Statistics in 2013, and elected to the 2018 class of fellows of the American Mathematical Society and the Institute for Operations Research and the Management Sciences. She gave the 2015 Medallion lecture for the Institute of Mathematical Statistics, on "Infinite-dimensional scaling limits of stochastic networks". In 2019, Ramanan was elected fellow of the American Association for the Advancement of Science (AAAS). In 2020 she was elected a fellow of the Society for Industrial and Applied Mathematics with the citation "Kavita Ramanan, Brown University, is being recognized for contributions to constrained and reflected processes and stochastic networks."

She received a Guggenheim Fellowship in 2020. She was elected to the American Academy of Arts and Sciences in 2021. She was awarded a Distinguished Research Achievement Award from Brown University in 2021, and she was named to the Department of Defense's Class of 2021 Vannevar Bush Faculty Fellows. She was appointed Senior Scholar at the Clay Mathematics Institute January–June 2022.
