= Donald Reid Womack =

American classical composer (born 1996)

Donald Reid Womack (born 1966) is a composer of contemporary classical music. He was born in Virginia, raised in East Tennessee and studied at Furman University and Northwestern University, receiving degrees in philosophy, music theory, and music composition.

He has composed more than 100 works for orchestra, chamber ensembles, solo instruments, and voice. Major works include a concerto for shakuhachi, koto and orchestra (After), two gayageum concertos (Scattered Rhythms and 무노리 Mu Nori), a haegeum concerto (Dancing With Spirits 혼무), a geomungo concerto (검은 용 Black Dragon) a violin concerto (In questi tempi di Conflitto), a viola concerto (Blue Ridge Seasons), an oratorio for chorus and chamber orchestra (Voices of Kalaupapa), and a triple concerto for shakuhachi, biwa and koto with ensemble of Japanese instruments (Three Trees 三木).

Womack's influences meld a broad range of sources, including post-minimalism, rock, bluegrass, and especially intercultural elements — in particular East Asian instruments. He spent a year in Tokyo, Japan studying Japanese instruments, as well as a year in Seoul, South Korea learning Korean music, and has composed nearly 60 works for Japanese, Korean and Chinese instruments in various combinations.

His music has been described as "original, creative and ingenious" (Shimbun Akahata), "powerful and impressively crafted" and "eclectic but also distinctive" (Honolulu Star-Bulletin), "raw energy alternating with a brooding potentiality" (Honolulu Advertiser), "wonderfully mellow and sprightly in its metrical incisiveness" (Buffalo NY Daily News), "capable of providing stimulus for a new century" (Neue Musikzeitung), and as having "the concentration of a haiku." (Classical CD Review)

Womack's works have been performed throughout the U.S., as well as in many countries in Europe, Asia, Oceania, South America and Africa by such ensembles as the Tokyo Metropolitan Symphony Orchestra, Louisville Orchestra, Honolulu Symphony, Changwon Philharmonic, National Orchestra of Korea, KBS Traditional Korean Orchestra, Seoul National Gugak Orchestra, Busan National Gugak Orchestra, Seoul Metropolitan Traditional Orchestra, Pittsburgh New Music Ensemble, Hong Kong New Music Ensemble, Pro Music Nipponia (日本音楽集団), and AURA-J.

Among his awards are a Guggenheim Fellowship, two Fulbright Research Fellowships, winner of the Gyeonggi Korean Orchestra International Composition Competition, First Prize in the Sigma Alpha Iota Inter-American Music Awards, two Individual Artist Fellowships from the Hawaii State Foundation on Culture and the Arts, and an Excellence in Research Award from the University of Hawaii. Since 1994 Womack has resided in Honolulu, Hawaii, where he is professor of music composition and theory, and a faculty member of the Center for Japanese Studies and the Center for Korean Studies at the University of Hawaii.
