= Karen Orren =

American political scientist

Karen Orren (born 1942) is an American political scientist, noted for her research on American political institutions and social movements, analyzed in historical perspective, and for helping to stimulate the study of American political development.

== Biography ==
Orren graduated with a B.A. from Stanford University, majoring in anthropology and political science. She then attended graduate school at the University of Chicago, completing her M.A. in political science in 1965 and her PhD degree in 1972. Her doctoral dissertation examined life insurance politics in Illinois. Orren is a professor of political science at UCLA, where she has taught since 1969.

Orren's research considers political questions in broader historical settings and in the context of institutional change. In her first book, Corporate Power and Social Change (1974), she studied corporate investment in housing over a century to illuminate the range of possible authority relations between government and business and account for the prevailing form. In Belated Feudalism (1991), Orren overturned the Hartzian proposition that American history is characterized by the "absence of feudalism," through an investigation of the labor movement’s prolonged confrontation with ancient master-and-servant laws. In 1993, Belated Feudalism won the J. David Greenstone Prize for the best book in politics and history, awarded by the American Political Science Association (APSA). In 1998, Orren won the Franklin L. Burdette Award for the best paper presented at the previous year's APSA annual meeting.

Orren has often collaborated with Stephen Skowronek, including founding the academic journal Studies in American Political Development in 1986, and co-authoring the books The Search for American Political Development (2004) and The Policy State: An American Predicament (2017). Through their work, Orren and Skowronek have significantly fostered the growth of American political development (or APD) as a distinct subfield within the discipline of political science. In recent years, Orren has increasingly focused on the study of the U.S. Constitution. In 2018, she co-edited The Cambridge Companion to the United States Constitution.

Orren was president of the Politics and History Section of APSA for 1995–1996 and from 2007 to 2009 was a co-editor of the American Political Science Review. In 2006, she was selected to deliver the UCLA Faculty Research Lecture, an honor reserved for "the university's most distinguished scholars."

== Selected publications ==
- Orren, Karen (1974). Corporate Power and Social Change: The Politics of the Life Insurance Industry. Baltimore: Johns Hopkins University Press. ISBN 978-0-8018-1507-2.
- Orren, Karen (September 1976). "Standing to Sue: Interest Group Conflict in the Federal Courts". American Political Science Review. 70 (3): 723–741. doi:10.2307/1959864. JSTOR 1959864. S2CID 147605680.
- Orren, Karen (1991). Belated Feudalism: Labor, the Law, and Liberal Development in the United States. Cambridge: Cambridge University Press. ISBN 978-0-521-41039-7.
- Orren, Karen; Skowronek, Stephen (1994). "Beyond the Iconography of Order: Notes for a 'New Institutionalism'". In Dodd, Lawrence C.; Jillson, Calvin (eds.). The Dynamics of American Politics. Transforming American Politics. Boulder: Westview Press. ISBN 978-0-8133-1711-3.
- Orren, Karen (February 1, 1994). "Labor Regulation and Constitutional Theory in the United States and England". Political Theory. 22 (1): 98–123. doi:10.1177/0090591794022001006. S2CID 143477778.
- Orren, Karen (June 1995). "The Primacy of Labor in American Constitutional Development". American Political Science Review. 89 (2): 377–388. doi:10.2307/2082431. JSTOR 2082431. S2CID 146852655.
- Orren, Karen (February 2001). "Officers' Rights: Toward a Unified Field Theory of American Constitutional Development". Law and Society Review. 34 (4): 873–909. doi:10.2139/ssrn.256002.
- Orren, Karen; Skowronek, Stephen (2004). The Search for American Political Development. Cambridge: Cambridge University Press. ISBN 978-0-521-83894-8.
- Orren, Karen; Skowronek, Stephen (2017). The Policy State: An American Predicament. Cambridge: Harvard University Press. ISBN 978-0-674-72874-5.
