= Victoria Hattam =

American political scientist

Victoria Hattam (born November 16, 1953) is an Australian-born American political scientist, noted for her research on American political economy and political development, and on the role of class, race and ethnicity in American politics.

Hattam graduated from the University of Melbourne in Australia in 1976 with a B.A.(Hons) degree in political science and philosophy. She completed her M.A. at the State University of New York at Buffalo in 1979 and her PhD in political science at MIT in 1987. Her doctoral dissertation on "Unions and Politics: The Courts and American Labor, 1806-1896" was awarded the E.E. Schattschneider prize by the American Political Science Association in 1989 for the best dissertation on American government and politics. Hattam's revised dissertation was published as her first book, Labor Visions and State Power (1993) and examines why labor has played a more limited role in national politics in the United States than in other advanced industrial societies.

Hattam taught at Yale University from 1987 to 1993, and was a visiting scholar at the Russell Sage Foundation from 1997 to 1999 and a member at the Institute for Advanced Study in Princeton for 2000-2001. She joined the political science faculty at New School University in New York City in 1993 and is a professor and chair of the department.

Hattam was president of the Politics and History Section of American Political Science Association for 2006–2007 and is a member of the editorial board of the journals International Labor and Working-Class History and Studies in American Political Development.

== Selected publications ==
- "Institutions and Political Change: Working-Class Formation in England and the United States, 1820-1896." 1992. Politics and Society 20(2): 133-166.
- Labor Visions and State Power: The Origins of Business Unionism in the United States. 1993. Princeton University Press.
- "History, Agency, and Political Change." 2000. Polity 32(3): 333-338.
- "Ethnicity: An American Genealogy." 2004. In Not Just Black and White: Historical and Contemporary Perspectives on Immigration, Race, and Ethnicity in the United States, eds. N. Foner and G. Frederickson. Russell Sage Foundation.
- "The 1964 Civil Rights Act: Narrating the Past, Authorizing the Future." 2004. Studies in American Political Development 18(1): 60-69.
- In the Shadow of Race: Jews, Latinos, and Immigrant Politics in the United States. 2007. University of Chicago Press.
