= Lesley A. Sharp =

American anthropologist

- Awards: Guggenheim Fellowship (2020)

Academic background
- Education: Brandeis University (BA); University of California, Berkeley (PhD)

Academic work
- Discipline: Anthropology
- Sub-discipline: Medical anthropology
- Institutions: Barnard College

Lesley A. Sharp is an American medical anthropologist. She is the Barbara Chamberlain & Helen Chamberlain Josefsberg ’30 Professor of Anthropology at Barnard College.

== Biography ==
Sharp earned her B.A. from Brandeis University, M.A. from the University of California, Berkeley, and a joint Ph.D. in medical anthropology from Berkeley and the University of California, San Francisco. She taught at Butler University before joining Barnard's faculty.

Sharp's early research focused on the daily and economic struggles of migrants and locals in a plantation economy in Northwestern Madagascar. Since 1990, her work has focused on the ethical and moral consequences of innovative medicine and science, especially in the organ transplantation industry, and human-animal relations in experimental laboratory research.

Sharp earned a Guggenheim Fellowship in anthropology and cultural studies in 2020. She also received the Wellcome Medal for Anthropology as Applied to Medical Problems in 2018 from the Royal Anthropological Institute of Great Britain and Ireland.
