= Stig Wennerström (colonel) =

Swedish airforce officer

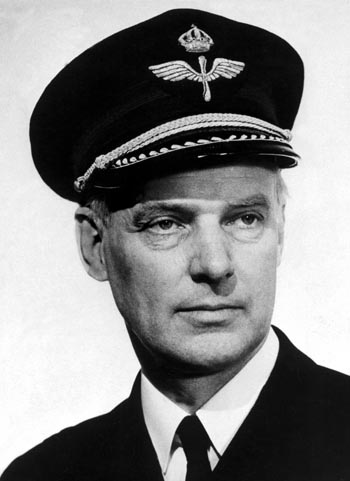
- Stig Wennerström, c. 1960
- Born: Stig Erik Constans Wennerström; 22 August 1906; Stockholm, Sweden
- Died: 21 March 2006 (aged 99); Danderyd, Sweden
- Military career
- Allegiance: Sweden; Soviet Union (Spy)
- Branch: Swedish Air Force
- Service years: 1929–1963; 1948–1963 (Spy)
- Rank: Colonel
- Nickname: "The Eagle"
- Other work: ADC to Duke of Västerbotten (1938–47)

Colonel Stig Erik Constans Wennerström (22 August 1906 – 21 March 2006) was a Swedish Air Force officer who was convicted of treason for espionage activities on behalf of the Soviet Union in 1964.

== Early life ==
Wennerström was born on 22 August 1906 in Stockholm, Sweden, the son of major Gustaf Wennerström and his wife Ester Berggren. On 12 May 1926, he passed studentexamen at Norra Real in Stockholm.

== Career ==
Wennerström was commissioned as an officer in the Swedish Navy with the rank of acting sub-lieutenant in 1929 and conducted flight training from 1931 to 1932. Wennerström transferred to the newly created Swedish Air Force where he was promoted to lieutenant in 1936. He attended the Royal Swedish Naval Staff College's staff school from 1936 to 1937. He served as aide-de-camp to Prince Gustaf Adolf, Duke of Västerbotten from 1938 to 1947 and was promoted to captain in 1939 and served as air attaché in Moscow from 1940 to 1941. Wennerström was promoted to major in 1944 and to lieutenant colonel in 1946. He was a teacher at the Royal Swedish Air Force Staff College from 1946 to 1948 and was again air attaché in Moscow from 1949 to 1952. Wennerström was promoted to colonel in 1951 and served as air attaché in Washington, D.C. from 1952 to 1957. He was section chief at the Military Office of the Minister of Defence from 1957 to 1961.

== Spying for the Soviet Union ==
During the 1950s, Wennerström leaked Swedish air defence plans and the entire Saab Draken fighter jet project to the Soviet Union. When working as an air attaché in Washington, D.C., he was very useful to the Soviet military intelligence agency, the GRU. As early as 1943, the Swedish Security Service (SÄPO), suspected that Wennerström was working for Germany and in 1947 there were indications that he had connections with the Soviet Union, but the suspicions couldn't be proven.

In 1959 an anonymous source identifying themselves as 'Sniper' wrote a series of letters to the American Ambassador to Switzerland, Henry J. Taylor. These revealed much useful intelligence and would be regarded as the British Security Service's 'finest post-war investigation'. In December 1960, Sniper was revealed as the Polish Military Intelligence officer Michał Goleniewski, who then defected to the US.

One of the leads provided by Sniper was that a senior Swedish Air Force officer was spying for the Soviets. Sniper did not identify him, but did state that he had previously been a CIA agent and had served in Moscow as the Swedish Air Attaché. These facts were communicated to Säpo and they pointed to Wennerström's record. Säpo then tapped his phone line and recruited his household maid for surveillance. Evidence collected by autumn 1961 was enough to have Wennerström transferred to a post without access to secret information. In June 1963, the maid reported that she had found some film rolls hidden in his attic and on 20 June he was arrested.

== Arrest and conviction ==
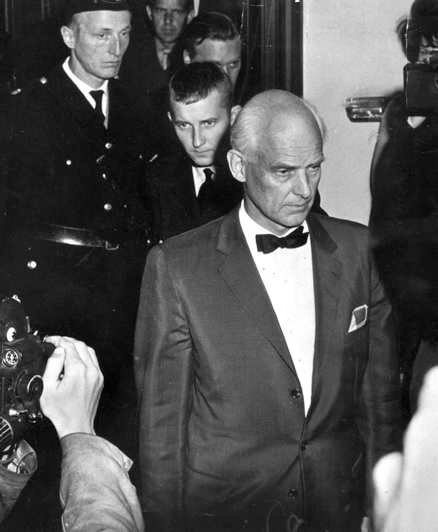
Wennerström in Stockholm City Court in the summer of 1963.

In the morning of 20 June 1963, Wennerström was on his way to his work at the Ministry for Foreign Affairs in central Stockholm. Just as he passed the Riksbron Bridge, three people from SÄPO came up behind Wennerström and arrested him. After his arrest, Wennerström was brought to SÄPO's premises on Bergsgatan in Kungsholmen, where the hearings began immediately. At the same time, Wennerström's house on Skirnervägen 20 in Djursholm was sealed off for a residential search that would take almost a week. Initially, Wennerström denied the charges. At the same time, SÄPO failed to develop the film rolls containing Wennerström's photographs of secret documents. An expert was called in, and after three and a half days, found the right method. When the photographed documents were displayed to Wennerström, he confessed, but at the same time denied that his spying had been directed against Sweden. Soon, however, he was convicted. During the six years prior to his arrest, Wennerström is believed to have handed over 20,000 pages of secret documents about the Swedish defences. The documents contained information about the Swedish Air Force's strategy, secret military bases, and radar defense and mobilization plans.

Wennerström was initially sentenced to life in prison, the most severe peacetime sentence. (Note: Under a military tribunal in wartime, treason could have been punishable by execution by firing squad. Sweden banned capital punishment altogether, even in wartime, in 1973) In 1972 the Swedish government commuted the sentence to 20 years, despite the Supreme Commander, General Stig Synnergren, still considering him to be a high security risk. He was paroled in 1974 after serving a total of 10 years; the norm in Sweden at the time was to release prisoners after they had served half their sentences.

== Personal life and death ==
In 1939 he married Ulla-Greta Carlsson (1919–2015), the daughter of consul Eric Carlsson and Helga Andersson. He had two daughters. One of his daughters, Christine, made headlines in 1957 when at the age of 16 she ran away to elope with her 18-year-old boyfriend, a Senate page named Huw Williams. The couple was apprehended eighteen days later in Pennsylvania, US, having been denied in their effort to obtain a marriage license in several states, and in Canada.

Wennerström died on 21 March 2006 at the retirement home Tallgården in Enebyberg, north of Stockholm. The funeral took place on 28 March 2006 at Altorp's Cemetery Chapel in Djursholm and he was buried on 3 May 2006 at Djursholm's Cemetery.

== Dates of rank ==
- 1929 – Acting sub-lieutenant (Navy)
- 1936 – Lieutenant (Air Force)
- 1939 – Captain
- 1944 – Major
- 1946 – Lieutenant colonel
- 1951 – Colonel

== Awards and decorations ==
=== Swedish ===
- (Sweden) King Gustaf V's Jubilee Commemorative Medal (1948)
- (Sweden) Knight of the Order of the Sword (1946) – excluded from the order by King Gustav VI Adolf on 21 September 1964.
- (Sweden) Knight of the Order of Vasa (1954) – excluded from the order by King Gustav VI Adolf on 21 September 1964.

=== Foreign ===
- (United States) Officer of the Legion of Merit (15 January 1958)
- (France) Aeronautical Medal
- (Mexico) Mexican Air Force medal

== Bibliography ==
- Wennerström, Stig (1972). Från början till slutet: en spions memoarer (in Swedish). Stockholm: Bonnier. ISBN 91-0-037890-9. SELIBR 7143825.
- Wennerström, Stig (1946). Morgondagens flyg: sett mot bakgrunden av teknikens utveckling och andra världskriget (in Swedish). Stockholm: Bonnier. SELIBR 1422397.
- Wennerström, Stig (1946). Flygstrategien i belysning av det andra världskriget: Tävlingsskrift år 1945... Kungl. Krigsvetenskapsakademiens handlingar och tidskrift. Bihäfte; 1946:3 (in Swedish). Stockholm: Akad. SELIBR 1417971.
- Wennerström, Stig (1946). Röda vingar: det ryska flyget från tsartid till nutid. Allhems flygböcker, 99-1852751-X; 3 (in Swedish). Malmö: Allhem. SELIBR 1387091.

== See also ==
- Stig Bergling
- Bertil Ströberg
