= Lawrence Rosenwald =

American literary scholar

Lawrence Alan Rosenwald (born 1948) is an American literary scholar, translator, pacifist, and performer. He is Anne Pierce Rogers Professor of English Emeritus at Wellesley College, where he taught from 1980 to 2022, and has directed the college’s Peace and Justice Studies Program. His scholarship focuses on American literature, translation studies, Yiddish literature, multilingualism, and the intersections of literature and nonviolence. He is the editor of War No More: Three Centuries of American Antiwar and Peace Writing (2016), an anthology for the Library of America, and the author of Emerson and the Art of the Diary (1988) and Multilingual America: Language and the Making of American Literature (2008). He was awarded a Guggenheim Fellowship in 2020.

== Biography ==
Rosenwald was educated at Columbia University, receiving his B.A. from Columbia College in 1970, his M.A. in 1971, and his Ph.D. in English literature in 1979. Before joining Wellesley College, he taught at Lehman College (1973–77) and in the Humanities Program at the University of Chicago (1978–80).

He has been married to Cynthia Schwan since 1976; they have twin daughters born in 1980. A longtime pacifist, Rosenwald has been a war tax resister since 1987 and has been involved in New England War Tax Resistance. A He is also active in Jewish cultural life as a Yiddishist, lay cantor, and lecturer.

== Career ==
Rosenwald taught at Lehman College of the City University of New York and at the University of Chicago before joining the faculty of Wellesley College in 1980.

He remained at Wellesley until his retirement in 2022, serving as Anne Pierce Rogers Professor of English and directing the college’s Peace and Justice Studies Program.

In addition to his academic work, Rosenwald has written and performed verse scripts for early music theater.

Since the 1980s he has been a regular collaborator with the Amherst Early Music Festival and has also worked with the San Francisco Early Music Society Workshop, Artek, Les Délices, the Texas Early Music Project, and Voices of Music.

He has also translated literary works from German, French, Yiddish, Latin, and Italian, with notable contributions including Scripture and Translation, Martin Buber and Franz Rosenzweig’s account of their Bible translation project.

Since 2004, Rosenwald has been an active member of Havurat Shalom, an egalitarian Jewish community in Somerville, Massachusetts. In that setting he has delivered numerous divrei Torah (short sermons) on weekly Torah portions and Jewish themes.

His divrei Torah address subjects such as multilingualism in the story of Babel, the binding of Isaac, the figure of Hagar and Ishmael, the Book of Jonah, and contemporary issues including antisemitism, feminism, and political violence.

== Scholarly work ==
Rosenwald’s research interests have evolved over his career. His early work centered on American diaries, particularly those of Ralph Waldo Emerson, leading to his book Emerson and the Art of the Diary (1988) and his later editing of Emerson’s journals for the Library of America.

He subsequently focused on theories of translation, multilingualism in literature, and American literary representations of language and dialect contact. His book Multilingual America: Language and the Making of American Literature (2008) explores the multilingual foundations of U.S. writing.

His later scholarship has emphasized pacifism and literature. As editor of War No More: Three Centuries of American Antiwar and Peace Writing (2016), Rosenwald curated works spanning speeches, poetry, fiction, journalism, and popular culture to trace the traditions of American antiwar and peace writing. His essays have also addressed war resistance, translation, and Yiddish literature.
