= Jennifer Pastor =

American sculptor and academic

Jennifer Pastor (born 1966) is an American sculptor and Professor of Visual Arts at the University of California Irvine. Pastor examines issues of space encompassing structure, body and object orientations, imaginary forms, narrative and progressions of sequence.

Pastor’s work has been described to play with the connection between the piece and the observer, making the observer hyper aware of their presence. Her sculptures including The Perfect Ride (2003), Dead Landscape (2009–2010), and Endless Arena (2013) are some examples of the connection made by Pastor between the piece and viewer. Her mediums range from animation to steel, and allow a mingling of the materials in a certain space.

Pastor's openness to a creative experience can be demonstrated in her participation of "Office Hours", which are fifty-minute sessions between a student and an artist. These one-on-one sessions allows for an exchange of questions and ideas in a non lecture environment to help the flow of creative ideas and questions. Office Hours encourages reflection and poses questions to better one's work. Office hours are also a mandatory legal part of teaching and should not be credited to Pastor's generosity but her reluctant participation in the University system.

== Biography ==
Pastor was born in Hartford, Connecticut. She graduated from the School of Visual Arts in 1988, earning a Bachelor of Fine Arts, and went on to study at the University of California, Los Angeles, graduating with a Master of Fine Arts in sculpture in 1992.

== Exhibitions ==
Pastor has exhibited in numerous museums including Kunstmuseum Wolfsburg, Germany; the Museum of Contemporary Art Chicago, Chicago; Museum of Contemporary Art, Los Angeles; Whitney Museum of American Art, New York. Pastor was included in the 1996 Sao Paulo Biennial, the 1997 Whitney Biennial and the 2003 Venice Biennale.

=== Select solo exhibitions ===
- Richard Telles Fine Art, Los Angeles (1994)
- Studio Guenzani, Milan, Italy (1995)
- Museum of Contemporary Art, Chicago (1996)
- The Perfect Ride, Regen Projects, Los Angeles (2004)
- Dead Landscape, Laura Lee Blanton Gallery, CORE Program, Houston (2009)
- Jennifer Pastor, Greengrassi, London (2009)
- Endless Arena, Regen Projects, Los Angeles (2013)
- Jennifer Pastor, Greengrassi, London, (2016)

=== Select group exhibitions ===
Pastor has participated in a number of group exhibitions through the years, from 1993 to 2015. These group exhibitions have been featured in various countries such as France, Brazil, the Netherlands, Italy, the U.K., and Korea, along with numerous states in the U.S.

- "Come As You Are: Art of the 1990s", Montclair Art Museum, Montclair, N.J., February 8, 2015 - May 17, 2015; travels to Telfair Museums, Savannah, GA, June 12 – September 20, 2015; University of Michigan Museum of Art, Ann Arbor, Mich., October 17, 2015 – January 31, 2016; Blanton Museum of Art, University of Texas, Austin, Texas, February 17 – May 15, 2016; catalogue
- "Acquisitions", Stedelijk Museum, Amsterdam, Netherlands, May – September, 2013
- "NanoMicroMega", University of California, San Diego, San Diego, September 14 – December 7, 2012
- "The Artist's Museum", Museum of Contemporary Art Los Angeles, Los Angeles, October 31, 2010 – January 31, 2011
- "Compass in Hand: Selections from The Judith Rothschild Foundation Contemporary Drawings Collection", Museum of Modern Art, New York, April 22, 2009 - January 4, 2010
- "Knocking on the Door", curated by Chison Kang, The Incheon Women Artists' Biennale, Incheon, Korea, November 10 –December 10, 2007, catalogue
- "Multiple Vantage Points: Southern California Women Artists, 1980–2006, "curated by Dextra Frankel, Los Angeles Municipal Art Gallery, Los Angeles, February 25 – April 15, 2007
- "Too Much Love", organized by Amy Adler, Angles Gallery, Santa Monica, June 29 – July 29, 2006
- "Recent Acquisitions", The Museum of Contemporary Art, Los Angeles, November 20, 2005 – January 9, 2006
- "Bidibidobidiboo", curated by Francesco Bonami, Sandretto Re Rebaudengo Collection, Turin, Italy, May 31 – October 2, 2005
- "Monuments for the USA", CCA Wattis Institute for Contemporary Arts, San Francisco, April 7 – May 14, 2005; travels to White Columns, New York, December 9 - February 7, 2006; catalogue
- "la Biennale di Venezia, Dreams and Conflicts: The Dictatorship of the Viewer, 50th International Art Exhibition", curated by Francesco Bonami, Venice, Italy, June 15 – November 2, 2003, catalogue
- "Inaugural Exhibition", Regen Projects, Los Angeles, January 25 - March 8
- Outlook International Art Exhibition, Athens, October 24, 2003- January 25, 2004, catalogue
- "Drawing Now: Eight Propositions", Museum of Modern Art Queens, New York, October 17 - January 6, 2003, catalogue
- "Drawings", Regen Projects, Los Angeles, May 26 - July 21
- Barbara Gladstone Gallery, Three-Person Exhibition (with Matthew Barney and Charles Ray), New York
- Greengrassi, London, U.K.
- Studio Guenzani, Milan, Italy
- "L.A. Times", curated by Francesco Bonami, Palazzo Re Rebaudengo, Guarene, Italy, May 10 – September 6, 1998
- "Present Tense", Museum of Modern Art, San Francisco, catalogue
- "Biennial Exhibition", Whitney Museum of American Art, New York
- "Sunshine & Noir: Art in L.A. 1960–1997", Louisiana Museum of Modern Art, Humelback, Denmark; curated by Lars Nittve; traveled 1997–1998 to Kunstmuseum, Wolfsburg, Germany, Castello di Rivoli, Museo D'Arte Contemporanea, Italy, Armand Hammer Museum of Art, Los Angeles, catalogue
- "New Work: Drawing Today", San Francisco Museum of Modern Art, San Francisco
- "Universalis", 23rd Biennial, Sao Paulo, Brazil, curated by Paul Schimmel (catalogue)
- "Contrafigura", Studio Guenzani, Milan, Italy
- "Surface De Reparation", FRAC Bourgone, Dijon, France; curated by Eric Troncy, catalogue
- "Invitational '93", Regen Projects, Los Angeles, (with Toba Khedoori, Catherine Opie, and Frances Stark)

== Works ==
=== The Perfect Ride, 2003 ===
The Perfect Ride is a three part installation featuring a large, luminescent sculpture inspired by the Hoover Dam’s water circulation system, along a magnified sculptural rendering of the human inner and outer ear based on Pastor’s memory of a model in a medical museum. The third part is a projected line drawn-animation of a cowboy performing an impossible, but what would otherwise be a perfect rodeo ride on a bull. The ideas behind the work are about balance and circulation, and how various organizing “armatures” direct systems of movement. The exhibition examines human’s ability to triumph over nature and it exemplifies Pastor’s extensive research on structures of movement. Pastor has explained that her fascination for rodeo competitions grew from “trying to learn the aesthetic language, or system, that everyone in the rodeo seems instinctively attuned to”.

=== Dead Landscape, 2009–2010 ===
The work Dead Landscape is an installation featuring 40 drawings and photographs that juxtaposes archival materials on wars concerning the U.S. with Pastor's own drawings on public, culturally sanctioned fights, ranging from gladiator events to the Ultimate Fighting Heavy Weight Championship. The work was inspired by Pastor's research involving veteran combat artists from campaigns such as World War II, the Korean War, the Vietnam War, and the Operation of Iraq. The research involved interviewing these combat artists, as well as collecting "first impression" drawings of the war. The drawings were the initial reaction to the event, before the person had a chance to alter or subtly change the experience in their head. Many of these archival drawings and photographs, of which she accessed through the National Military Archives of the Navy, Army, and Marines, have never been on display before her exhibit. The contrasting element is Pastor's own "impression drawings", of when she attended local and national organized fights. These two elements are paired together in the installation creating an interesting opposition.

=== Endless Arena, 2013 ===
Endless Arena is a large-scale endless loop sculpture inspired from "blind gesture drawings" made of electroless nickel-plated steel and painted fiberglass. The piece was created from gesture drawings Pastor created over a two-year period of attending unregulated fighting events. Endless Arena came from an exploration of the space of the fights Pastor attended, including synchronized movements and the shifting dominance of the bodies. "Pastor sought to synthesize and distill fragments of these observations, spaces, and visceral experiences into a sculptural work."

== Museum collections ==
- FRAC Bourgone Dijon, France
- Louisiana Museum of Modern Art, Humbelback, Denmark
- Museum of Contemporary Art, Los Angeles, California
- The Museum of Modern Art, New York New York
- San Francisco Museum of Modern Art, California
- Sandretto Re Rebaudengo Collection, Turin, Italy
- Stedelijk Museum, Amsterdam, Netherlands
- Whitney Museum of American Art, New York
- The Museum of Contemporary Art Chicago, Chicago
- Kunstmuseum, Wolfsburg, Germany
- Participated in 1996 Sao Paulo Biennial, the 1997 Whitney Biennial and the 2003 Venice Biennale

== Grants ==
- Louis Comfort Tiffany (1995)

== Publications ==
- Perfect Ride (2004)
