= Rheim Alkadhi =

American visual artist (born 1973)

- Born: ريم القاضي; 1973 (age 52–53); Buffalo, NY
- Known for: intermedia
- Website: https://picturesclerk.net

Rheim Alkadhi (Arabic: ريم القاضي) (born 1973) is a visual artist based in Berlin who works internationally. Alkadhi operates under contemporary conditions in alternating geographical contexts, circumscribed by objects, images, and texts, via digital media, interactions in public space, and intimate person-to-person contact. Their work is described as: "With multiple migratory belongings/trajectories in regions of imposed geopolitical conflict, the perception of authoritarian, imperial, colonial dominance is magnified in everyday life. Thus, the work registers a nonconforming emancipatory feminist existence under such planetary conditions, using mediums of language, artifacts of material reality, and living interactions."

== Early life and education ==
Rheim Alkadhi lived first in Benghazi, Libya, and then between Baghdad and New England; raised by an American mother and an Iraqi father and attended public school in Iraq until the family returned to the United States at the start of the Iran–Iraq War.

== Selected projects ==
- 2009: residency at Townhouse Gallery in Cairo, gathering material for the limited edition artist book "Destroyed in Baghdad / Repaired in Cairo: A Viewer's Manual to a Temporary Art Practice in the Auto Mechanics District". In 2009, the limited edition artist book "Post Cards From the Clandestine Troupe" was printed.
- 2010: one month in Itaewon, Seoul with the artist-run space DoBaeBacSa; also artist in residence at PØST in Los Angeles.
- 2011: artist in residence at Dar al Ma'mun in Tassoultante and then independent of institutional assistance in the village of Tahannaout, Al Haouz Province.
- 2012: artist in residence at Darat al Funun in Amman via the initiative of Rijin Sahakian and Sada for Contemporary Iraqi Art.
- 2012: as a temporary member of a household of women in the West Bank village of Jamma'in in Palestine, the project "Collective Knotting Together of Hairs" was developed with the local Women's Association, with Riwaq Center for Architectural Conservation in Ramallah, and with Al-Ma'mal Foundation for Contemporary Art in Jerusalem.
- 2014: developed the project "Communications From the Field of Contact (Each Hair Is a Tongue)" during a residency at the Sharjah Art Foundation.
- 2015 and 2016: created live presentations included "Eye Theatre Closes Its Doors and Opens Them Again", commissioned for the Asia Pacific Triennial in Australia, and "Köln Phantasm" developed and performed while a fellow in visual art at Akademie Schloss Solitude in Stuttgart.
- 2016: "Night Taxi", a multimedia suite of documents (video accompanied by meter, route, and fare) outlined milliseconds leading up to the crossing of an arbitrary geographical border.
- 2017: "Hairs of the Oppressed" was featured at once resolved and ongoing; a sculpture concept accompanied by the text "Script for Eleven Hairs" at Autonomes Cultur Centrum, Weimar. Rotating authorial concept acknowledges the collaborative emancipatory politics/method of Theatre of the Oppressed, on which this piece is based.
- 2018: participation in the experimental walking art school Spring Sessions across Jordan; later that year, a public staging at the migrant-run OBI market in Berlin, based on conversations and ongoing relationships initiated in that context. Displayed objects included: mock-up of geo-political extraction field; large block of Styrofoam for flotation; seven shoe fragments collected along migration routes; refugee housing in Europe for a family of eight; patterned blanket; eye of a needle.
- 2019: travel to various provinces of Iraq resulted in many of the elements featured in the ongoing framework and exhibition "Majnoon Field".
- 2020: Toward the Inalienable Right of the Dispossessed in the exhibition Beyond Walls at Kunstmuseum Stuttgart
- 2021: Arrival Points screening and exhibition at Haus der Statistik, Berlin
- 2022: Devastation on Your Beautiful Eyes exhibition at Beirut Art Center; Call for Immediate Reparations From the Waves of Our Mass Migration installation at the Trienniale Kleinplastik Fellbach; Speak, Then, Material Witness, in the Medium of Rebellion exhibition as teaching structure at Kunstverein Uelzen

Rheim Alkadhi's work was shown at the 12th Sharjah Biennial, at the New Museum, in the 2012 Jerusalem Show, at Documenta (13), and in the 2010 Cairo Biennial.

== Fellowships and Honors ==
- 2010: Rheim Alkadhi received a grant from Art Matters and the Center for Cultural Innovation.; in 2009, awarded a Mid-Career Artist Fellowship from the California Community Foundation; in 2008, awarded a grant from the Arab Fund for Art and Culture; in 1990, received an award from the National Foundation for Advancement in the Arts and from 1990 to 1994 the Musicfest award for young artists.
- 2017: Mophradat
- 2017: Rockefeller Bellagio
- 2019: Berlin Senat Research Stipend
- 2019: AFAC
- 2020/2021: Künstlerische Forschung Berlin
- 2020: Guggenheim Foundation
- 2021: Art Matters
- 2021: Stiftung Kunstfonds

== Selected exhibitions ==
- When Artists Say We – Artists Space, New York – March 8 – April 29, 2006
- Draw a Line and Follow It - Los Angeles Contemporary Exhibitions – June 21 through August 20, 2006
- Eternal Flame: Imagining a Future at the End of the World - Redcat, Los Angeles – February 15 through April 8, 2007
- System Error: War Is a Force That Gives Us Meaning - Palazzo delle Papesse, Sienna – February 3 through May 6, 2007
- OÙ? Scènes du Sud - Carré d'Art, Nîmes – June 13 through September 21, 2008 (group exhibition)
- Veronica – Nichols Gallery, Pitzer Art Galleries – September 24 through December 11, 2009 (group exhibition)
- Exhibition for Adults and Children - Dobaebacsa, Seoul – April 1 through 26, 2010 (solo exhibition)
- What's Become of Us? - PØST, Los Angeles – November 2010
- The Page: An Interactive Exhibition of Artist Books - Guggenheim Gallery, Chapman University
- 12th Cairo Biennial – Opera House, Cairo – December 12, 2010 through February 12, 2011
- Communitas. Among Others - Camera Austria, Graz – September 25, 2011 through January 1, 2012 (group exhibition)
- Lucky Today - Glasgow International Festival of Visual Art (with Hiwa K Hiwa)
- Hesaplașma | Aftermath – Akbank Sanat, Istanbul – March 14 through May 17, 2012 (group exhibition)
- Documenta (13) And and and Platform, 2012
- Gestures in Time/The Jerusalem Show - West Bank and Jerusalem – November 1 through 15, 2012
- Here Is My Life Which I Devote to Learning About You – Darat al Funun, Amman – May 4 through 31, 2013 (solo exhibition)
- Alwan338 / Foundations – Al Riwaq Art Space, Adliya, Bahrain – March 3 through April 19, 2014
- Here and Elsewhere – New Museum of Contemporary Art, New York City – July 16 through September 28, 2014 (group exhibition)
- 12th Sharjah Biennial: The Past, the Present, the Possible - Sharjah Art Foundation – March 5 through June 5, 2015
- Im Dickicht der Haare / Entangled in Hair – Grimmwelt Museum, Kassel – October 9, 2015 through une 5, 2016 (group exhibition)
- 8th Asia Pacific Triennial of Contemporary Art – Brisbane – November 21, 2015 through April 10, 2016 (group exhibition)
- Sites of Return – Beit Michael Sufan, Ramallah / Qalandiya International – October 10 through 31, 2016 (group exhibition)
- Why Not Ask Again? – Power Station of Art – November 11, 2016 through March 12, 2017 (11th Shanghai Bienniale curated by Raqs Media Collective)
- True Lies - Autonomes Cultur Centrum (ACC), Weimar – February 10 through May 7, 2017
- IM_MOBILITIES - Galerie KUB, Leipzig – June 10 through June 30, 2017 (group exhibition)
- Material Communities (Objects We Arrange in the Energy Field) - OBI Parkplatz, Berlin – October 7, 2018 (public staging)
- Rheim Alkadhi: Majnoon Field – Temporary Gallery, Centre for Contemporary Art, Cologne – August 30 through December 15, 2019 (solo exhibition)

== Live presentations ==
- Eye Theater Closes Its Doors and Opens Them Again – presented at Queensland Art Gallery of Modern Art, Brisbane (2015)
- Köln Phantasm – produced and performed at Akademie Schloss Solitude (2016); performed at Kunstgebäude Stuttgart (2017)
- Mosul Vapor – performed at Kunstgebäude Stuttgart (2017)
- View Through the Eye of a Needle - performed in Wadi Rum as part of Spring Sessions (2018)
- Our Current Dwelling Is Fire – produced at the Rockefeller Bellagio Center; performed at March Meeting, Sharjah (2018); and Videonale Scope7, Cologne (2019)

== Online projects ==
- My Lover in Unequal Parts – 'micro literature' based on found images from concurrent wars in Iraq, Lebanon, and Palestine, 2006
- Archive of a digital practice comprising digital and narrative gendered constructions, mostly from found online material, 2007–2010
- Pictures from a Camera - photo-based poetry from the revolutionary fervor in North Africa, produced in 2011; introduction written for online journal Jadaliyya, translated to Arabic by Sinan Antoon and Bilal Khbeiz, 2011, 2012
- Picture City Body – produced in Beirut, commissioned by the New Museum's online platform, 2013
- Photo Manual Baghdad – This Long Century, 2014
- Public Directory – Makhzin 2: Feminisms, 2015
- Autobiography of a Flame – The Derivative (.ح.ر.ق), 2022

== Video work ==
- Subtitles for Stolen Pictures - produced from visual elements of online reportage, US occupation of Iraq – 00:08:00, 2007
- ruh - produced using ephemeral materials available within a makeshift residency in Itaewan, Seoul – 00:06:35, 2010
- Night Taxi - commissioned by Raqs Media Collective for Shanghai Bienniale – 00:03:00, 2016
- Majnoon Field – produced from time-based material gathered in Southern Iraq, shown in the exhibition by the same name – 00:10:00, 2019

== Artist books ==
- Post Cards from the Clandestine Troupe – book of postcards generated from queered online war imagery from Iraq, with original texts, limited edition of 30, 2009
- Majnoon Field Samples - color-based poetry, produced for view within the exhibition "Majnoon Field", 2019
