= Stephen Skowronek =

American political scientist (born 1951)

- Born: 1951 (age 74–75)
- Education: Oberlin College; Cornell University
- Occupation: Academic
- Employer: Yale University

Stephen Skowronek (born 1951) is an American political scientist, noted for his research on American national institutions and the U.S. presidency, and for helping to stimulate the study of American political development.

== Early life and education ==
Skowronek grew up in Bridgewater, New Jersey, where he graduated from high school in 1969. He attended Oberlin College, completing a B.A. in 1973. He earned a Ph.D. in political science from Cornell University in 1979. His doctoral dissertation was revised and published as his first book, Building a New American State (1982).

== Career ==
Skowronek taught at Cornell and UCLA before becoming a fellow at the Woodrow Wilson International Center for Scholars in 1985. He joined the political science faculty of Yale University in 1986, and has been Pelatiah Perit Professor of Political and Social Science at Yale since 1999. He has also been a visiting professor at several American and European universities, including as Chair in American Civilization at the École des Hautes Études en Sciences Sociales in Paris in 1996-1997. He was the Wynant Visiting Professor at the Rothermere American Institute and Balliol College, Oxford in 2018-2019.

Skowronek has collaborated with Karen Orren on several projects, including founding the academic journal Studies in American Political Development in 1986, and writing the book The Search for American Political Development (2004). Through their work, Skowronek and Orren have promoted the growth of American political development (or APD) as a distinct subfield within the discipline of political science.

The first edition of Skowronek's book The Politics Presidents Make (1993) won two awards from the American Political Science Association (APSA): the J. David Greenstone Prize for best book in politics and history and the Richard E. Neustadt Prize for best book on the American presidency. In 2017 this book was the third on the presidency awarded the APSA Legacy Prize for its lasting influence. Skowronek served as President of the Politics and History Section of APSA for 1994-1995.

== Publications ==
- Building a New American State: The Expansion of National Administrative Capacities, 1877-1920 Cambridge University Press (1982) ISBN 0-521-28865-7
- The Politics Presidents Make: Leadership from John Adams to Bill Clinton, Belknap Press (1997) ISBN 0-674-68937-2
  - "Franklin Roosevelt and the modern presidency." Studies in American Political Development 6.2 (1992): 322-358.
- "Regimes and regime building in American government: A review of literature on the 1940s." Political Science Quarterly 113.4 (1998): 689-702. online, (with Karen Orren)
- The Search for American Political Development, Cambridge University Press (2004) ISBN 0-521-54764-4 (with Karen Orren)
- Formative Acts: American Politics in the Making, University of Pennsylvania Press (2007) ISBN 978-0-8122-4012-2 (co-edited by Matthew Glassman)
- Rethinking Political Institutions: The Art of the State, New York University Press (2007) ISBN 978-0-8147-4056-9 (co-edited with Ian Shapiro and Daniel Galvin)
- Presidential Leadership in Political Time: Reprise and Reappraisal, University Press of Kansas (2008) ISBN 978-0-7006-1574-2
- "The conservative insurgency and presidential power: A developmental perspective on the unitary executive." Harvard Law Review 122.8 (2009): 2070-2103. download
- The Policy State: An American Predicament, Harvard University Press, (2017) ISBN 9780674728745 (With Karen Orren)
- "Beyond the iconography of order: notes for a 'new institutionalism'." in The dynamics of American politics (Routledge, 2018) 311-330; (With Karen Orren)
