= Angel Nevarez and Valerie Tevere =

American artistic duo

Angel Nevarez and Valerie Tevere are a pair of American artists that have been collaborating on video, sound, performance and installation projects since 2001. Several of their projects have been produced under the collective name neuroTransmitter. Their art works often incorporate popular music and examine how visual forms traverse and are complicated once they are at play in public spaces.

Nevarez and Tevere have developed and exhibited works in sites as geographically diverse as the Staten Island Ferry, Plaza de la Liberación in Guadalajara, Austin City Hall's Plaza Stage, and the Museum of Modern Art’s Sculpture Garden in New York. Their work often considers the relationship among politics, sound and language. For instance, in their 2010 performance The War Song, the artists rearranged Culture Club's song of the same name. By slowing the tempo and switching the score to a minor key, Angel and Valerie's version of the song revealed a certain pathos within the seemingly naive lyrics.

The first United States survey of their work occurred at ICA Philadelphia in 2016.

== Education ==
Angel Nevarez was a Whitney Museum Independent Study Program studio fellow from 2001-2002, and studied Biology at the University of California, San Diego (1993-98).

Valerie Tevere was a Whitney Museum Independent Study Program studio fellow from 1999-2000. She graduated with an MFA in Photography from California Institute of the Arts, Valencia, California (1997), and holds a BA in Political Science from the University of California, San Diego (1993).

== Major works ==
=== Memory of a Time Twice Lived ===
Memory of a Time Twice Lived is a video work that merges several film genres—music video, documentary, the French avant-garde and science fiction. The project was shot on location in Philadelphia and Mexico City, and features an accordionist performing in sites throughout Philadelphia.

=== Parley ===
Valerie Tevere and Angel Nevarez produced a site-responsive work at the Old Bronx Borough Courthouse part of the art organization No Longer Empty's exhibition "When You Cut into the Present the Future Leaks Out" curated by Regine Basha in 2015. Using the framework of call and response, the sound installation explored the history of hip-hop and break dancing in the Bronx. Spoken word narration was provided by B-Girl Rokafella and MC Lady L, and included reference to South Bronx luminaries like Afrika Bambaataa. The piece was also shown in the artists' survey exhibition at the ICA Philadelphia in 2016.

=== Another Protest Song: Karaoke with a Message ===
In light of the 2008 presidential elections, the two artists began studying the role that soapboxes provide a mediated space to allow citizens to express political interests, fears and hopes. Over a two-day period on September 8, Valerie Tevere and Angel Nevarez joined the Creative Time group event entitled, Democracy in America: The National Campaign. Their project Another Protest Song, was organized into a karaoke suite of "protest" songs. Throughout New York City, the artists set up performance stages, and invited the general public to perform songs of protest.

== Honors and awards ==
- Artist Residency, Grand Central Art Center, Santa Ana, California, United States. (2017/2018)
- Artist Residency, Pioneer Works, Red Hook, Brooklyn, New York, United States. (2017)
- International Research Programme Grant, Danish Arts Council, Denmark. (2012)
- Artist Residency, Botkyrka Konsthall, Tumba, Sweden. (2010)
- Creative Capital award (2009)
- Art Matters Grant, New York, New York, United States. (2009)
- Artist Residency, The International Artists Studio Program in Stockholm (IASPIS), Stockholm, Sweden. (2009–2010)
