= Suzanne Caporael =

Suzanne Caporael (born 1949) is an American artist. Her work is held in the permanent collections of the Whitney Museum of American Art, the Carnegie Museum of Art, and the High Museum of Art.
