= Rogers Smith =

American political scientist (born 1953)

- Born: September 20, 1953 (age 73); Spartanburg, South Carolina, United States
- Occupation: Political scientist

Academic background
- Education: Michigan State University (BA); Harvard University (MA, PhD)

Rogers M. Smith (born September 20, 1953) is an American political scientist and author noted for his research and writing on American constitutional and political development and political thought, with a focus on issues of citizenship and racial, gender, and class inequalities. His work identifying multiple, competing traditions of national identity including "liberalism, republicanism, and ascriptive forms of Americanism" has been described as "groundbreaking." Smith is the Christopher H. Browne Distinguished Professor of Political Science at the University of Pennsylvania. He was the president of the American Political Science Association (APSA) for 2018–2019.

== Education ==
Born in Spartanburg, South Carolina, and raised in Springfield, Illinois, Smith graduated with a B.A. in political science from James Madison College, Michigan State University in 1974, including study abroad at the University of Kent in England. He attended graduate school at Harvard University, completing his M.A. in 1978 and his PhD degree in government in 1980.

== Career ==
Smith taught at Yale University from 1980 to 2001, as the Alfred Cowles Professor of Government and the co-director of the Center for the Study of Race, Inequality, and Politics. In 2001 he moved to the University of Pennsylvania, where he is the Christopher H. Browne Distinguished Professor of Political Science.

Smith was the founding chair of the Penn Program on Democracy, Citizenship, and Constitutionalism, later the Andrea Mitchell Center for the Study of Democracy, from 2006 to 2017. Smith was also a co-founder of the Teachers Institute of Philadelphia, a partnership between the university and public schools. He co-chaired its advisory council from 2006 until 2018. Smith was associate dean for the social sciences in the School of Arts and Sciences at the University of Pennsylvania from 2014 to 2018.

Smith was president of the Politics and History section of American Political Science Association (APSA) for 2001–2002 and served on the APSA Council in 2005 and 2006. He was vice president of the American Political Science Association in 2008–2009 and co-president of the Migration and Citizenship section of APSA from 2013 to 2015. He served as president of the American Political Science Association in 2018–2019.

== Recognition ==
Smith's writings have received numerous awards. Civic Ideals (1997) was a finalist for the 1998 Pulitzer Prize in history, and won several awards from the American Political Science Association (APSA), the Organization of American Historians, and the Social Science History Association.

Smith was elected a fellow of the American Academy of Arts and Sciences in 2004; a fellow of the American Academy of Political and Social Science in 2011; and a member of the American Philosophical Society in 2016.

== Selected publications ==
- That Is Not Who We Are! Populism and Peoplehood, 2020. Yale University Press.
- Political Peoplehood: The Roles of Values, Ideas, and Identities. 2015. University of Chicago Press.
- Still a House Divided: Race and Politics in Obama's America. 2011. Princeton University Press. (With Desmond S. King).
- "Religious Rhetoric and the Ethics of Political Discourse: The Case of George W. Bush." 2008. Political Theory 36: 272–300.
- "Racial Orders in American Political Development". 2005. American Political Science Review 99: 75–92. (with Desmond S. King).
- Problems and Methods in the Study of Politics. 2004. Cambridge University Press. (edited with Ian Shapiro and Tarek Masoud).
- Stories of Peoplehood: The Politics and Morals of Political Memberships. 2003. Cambridge University Press.
- The Unsteady March: The Rise and Decline of Racial Equality in America. 1999. University of Chicago Press. (with Philip A. Klinkner).
- Civic Ideals: Conflicting Visions of Citizenship in U.S. History. 1997. Yale University Press.
- "Science, Non-Science, and Politics: On Turns to History in Political Science." 1996. In The Historic Turn in the Human Sciences, ed. T. J. McDonald. University of Michigan Press.
- "Beyond Tocqueville, Myrdal, and Hartz: The Multiple Traditions in America." 1993. American Political Science Review 87: 549–566.
- "If Politics Matters: Implications for a New Institutionalism." 1992. Studies in American Political Development 6(1): 1–36.
- Liberalism and American Constitutional Law, 2nd ed. 1990. Harvard University Press.
- Citizenship Without Consent: the Illegal Alien in the American Polity. 1985. Yale University Press. (with Peter H. Schuck).
- "Constitutional Interpretation and Political Theory." 1983. Polity 15: 492–514.
