= Studies in American Political Development =

- Discipline: Political science
- Language: English
- Edited by: Paul Frymer, Marie Gottschalk, Kimberley Johnson

Publication details
- History: 1986–present
- Publisher: Cambridge University Press (United Kingdom)
- Impact factor: 0.909 (2014)

Standard abbreviations
- ISO 4: Stud. Am. Political Dev.

Indexing
- CODEN: SAPDFH
- ISSN: 0898-588X (print); 1469-8692 (web)
- LCCN: 87642058
- JSTOR: 0898588X
- OCLC no.: 15122845

Links
- Journal homepage; Online access; Online archive

Studies in American Political Development (SAPD) is a political science journal founded in 1986 and presently published by Cambridge University Press. It is the flagship journal of the American political development (APD) subfield in political science.

SAPD publishes theoretical and empirical research on political development and institutional change in the United States. It features a diverse range of subject matters and methodologies, including comparative, interdisciplinary, and international studies that illuminate the American case. Journal articles usually focus on the evolution of governmental institutions over time and on their social, economic and cultural setting.

The journal is published twice per year, in April and October. The journal is noted for publishing much longer articles—up to 75 pages—than is common among political science journals. For example, the maximum length for papers submitted to the American Political Science Review is 45 pages.

SAPD was founded by political scientists Karen Orren and Stephen Skowronek. Its current editors are Paul Frymer of Princeton University, Marie Gottschalk of the University of Pennsylvania, and Kimberley Johnson of New York University. It has been instrumental in fostering the growth of APD as a distinct and popular subfield within the discipline of political science. SAPD's editorial advisory board includes leading political scientists and historians including Joyce Appleby, Walter Dean Burnham, Victoria Hattam, Ira Katznelson, Theodore Lowi, Theda Skocpol, Rogers Smith, and Daniel Carpenter. The editors and numerous editorial advisers for SAPD have also served a term as president of the Politics and History Section of the American Political Science Association.

According to the Journal Citation Reports, the journal has a 2018 impact factor of 0.909, ranking it 122 out of 176 journals in the category "Political Science".
