= Political Theory (journal) =

Academic journal

- Discipline: Political science
- Language: English
- Edited by: Joshua F. Dienstag, Elisabeth Ellis, Davide Panagia

Publication details
- History: 1973-present
- Publisher: SAGE Publications
- Frequency: Bimonthly
- Impact factor: 1.3 (2023)

Standard abbreviations
- ISO 4: Polit. Theory

Indexing
- ISSN: 0090-5917 (print); 1552-7476 (web)
- LCCN: 73641963
- JSTOR: 0090-5917
- OCLC no.: 39266906

Links
- Journal homepage; Online access; Online archive

Political Theory: An International Journal of Political Philosophy, commonly known as Political Theory, is a bimonthly peer-reviewed academic journal covering political science. The journal was established in 1973 and is published by SAGE Publications.

== Editors ==
From 2005 to 2012, the editor-in-chief was Mary G. Dietz (Northwestern University) followed by Jane Bennett (Johns Hopkins University). Lawrie Balfour (University of Virginia) served as editor-in-chief From 2017-21. In 2021, Joshua Foa Dienstag (University of California, Los Angeles), Elisabeth Ellis (University of Otago), and Davide Panagia (University of California, Los Angeles) were appointed as editors. In 2024, Banu Bargu (University of California, Santa Cruz), Kevin Olson (University of California, Irvine), and Massimiliano Tomba (University of California, Santa Cruz) were appointed as editors.

== Abstracting and indexing ==
The journal is abstracted and indexed in Scopus and the Social Sciences Citation Index. According to the Journal Citation Reports, the journal has a 2023 impact factor of 1.3.
