= Cyrilla Mozenter =

American artist

- Born: 1947 (age 78–79); Newark, New Jersey, U.S.
- Education: Pratt Institute
- Known for: Contemporary Art
- Awards: Guggenheim Fellowship, New York Foundation for the Arts Fellowships
- Website: cyrillamozenter.com

Cyrilla Mozenter is a New York-based artist known for her hand stitched industrial wool felt freestanding and wall pieces that include the transplantation of cutout letters, letter-derived, and pictogram-like shapes, as well as her hybrid works on paper, incorporating drawing, writing, painting, and collage. Her works make reference to the writings of Gertrude Stein. Awarded a Guggenheim Fellowship in 2020, her work is represented in many public collections including The Brooklyn Museum and The Yale University Art Gallery.

== Education and work ==
Mozenter attended Pratt Institute, graduating with BFA and MFA degrees in 1970 and 1972.

Mozenter has worked with a variety of techniques and materials ranging from the ready-made to the hand-made as well as from the nearly imperceptible to the bold and graphic over the course of her career, however, her consistent focus has been described as the interior landscape of thought. There is an emphasis on tactility, as her work has also been consistently process-oriented, involving a purposeful subversion of expectation with a concomitant striving for a quality of inevitability. The artist considers her work as evidence of the experience of making it.

Between 1982 and 1990 Mozenter produced an extensive body of work in charcoal drawing. She has described abandoning paint and soft brushes in favor of hard sticks of charcoal imagined as swords in an effort "to cut through." From the resulting fields of gestural marks, a new vocabulary of pictogram-like shapes, icons of a symbolic and ambiguous nature emerged. Many of these drawings are fifteen to eighteen feet long, necessitating the artist's physical immersion in the work itself. The resulting fields of gestural marks comprise a visual tangle that can be seen as suggesting wool felt, the material the artist came to later and with which she is best known.

Myrtle leaves, allspice, arnica, beeswax, Chinese laundry soap, dried eggplant skins, walnuts, hazelnuts, fruit pits, string, lima beans, sugar cubes, thread, and peanuts are among the unlikely materials that Mozenter used in her work in the 1990s. In her Art in America review, Janet Koplos brought attention to the work's directness and physicality, describing it as "an encounter with the real." She mentions Mozenter's treatment of the small and commonplace as connoting value and suggesting an almost sacramental air through obsessive repetition. An installation of this time entitled Homage to Francis Ponge (1990-1991) consists of soaps stolen from public bathrooms resting on rows of white linen runners placed directly on the floor—and an autobiographical text, Incidents of Soap Stealing in Various States in Mexico. In Drawing Papers #8, curator Elizabeth Finch writes, "Mozenter speaks of the bar of soap as a renewable resource—solidly inert at one moment and luxuriously expansive the next—in perpetual re-creation despite or because of its eventual demise." Robert Morgan establishes the installation's relationship to issues of object-ness in the work of the early Conceptualists and mentions the work's "concept and design, narration and its projection into a formal arrangement."

In addition to material concerns, Mozenter's practice concerns itself with the subject of language and literature, prominently with the work of Gertrude Stein. Elizabeth Finch writes that, like Stein, Mozenter joins her reader/viewers in a "pact of the imagination, that allowed some things to remain joyfully unexplained, elusive. The opposite of expectation turns out just right." The artist has used Stein's words directly in works on paper, but also as titles, notably of four exhibitions: Very well saint at The Drawing Center, (2000), Cuts and Occasions at Dieu Donné Papermill (2002), More saints seen at Aldrich Contemporary Art Museum (2005), warm snow at Adam Baumgold Gallery (2010), and warm snow: Sculpture in Two and Three Dimensions at Garrison Art Center (2014). The writer's presence is felt as an underlying inspiration in Mozenter's oeuvre. As critic Jonathan Goodman remarked in his Sculpture magazine review.

The drawings, like the sculptures, feel like they are the visual equivalent of Gertrude Stein's words, which possess a lyrical acuity all their own. Mozenter's work shows us how Modernism may still be accessed in a postmodern world, for its forms build a relationship in which the art is supported by its references to other media. In that sense, the work is remarkably open and expressive, living as it does between the directness of its own statement and its connection to another work of art.

Mozenter has been working with industrial wool felt since the late 1990s. Felt first appeared in small beige bits as collage elements in works on paper along with Band-Aids, wooden ice cream spoons, toothpicks, and popsicle sticks. In the catalog for Endpapers: Drawings 1890-1900 and 1990-2000 at the Neuberger Museum of Art, curator Judy Collischan wrote, "Her unusual materials...suggest the margins of life that are erratic, unpredictable and capricious occurring in spite of our continual attempts to maintain order." These works are made with double layers of handmade paper stitched together, in most cases, at the top edge. The implied interior space eventually grew in volume, becoming actual in the freestanding structures of the More saints seen work. As described by curator Jessica Hough:

Cyrilla Mozenter's small-scale sculptures, made primarily from cream-colored felt, have material fabrication. Felt a textile of ancient origin used now in industry as well as children's crafts—along with discarded ice cream spoons, scavenged from urban sidewalks, speaks to the everyday; silk thread and carefully-placed pearls hint at the quality with which the maker has imbued the objects.

The pencil lines and loose threads indicate the process by which the works were formed; the seams of the vessels, laid bare, reveal both the strength and vulnerability uniquely communicated by a sewn form. The sculptures give the impression of surrogates for objects no longer present, as if the artist has resurrected them from a drawing of something lost to history.

Mozenter has continued with industrial wool felt and works on and with paper. Pieces range from felt wall works, sometimes banner-like or larger, with the presence of tapestries, to freestanding constructions of either felt or paper with cardboard suggesting elemental architectural forms. Mozenter's practice actively maintains a tension between form and medium, with a sustained focus on the inherent properties of a given material. The artist has used the word devotional to describe the trying process of hand-stitching industrial wool felt.

The felt freestanding pieces are self-supporting, that is, they are made without armature or stuffing of any kind. The spiraling stitches of the supporting seams function as an exoskeleton. Mozenter has noted, "the doomed attempt at regularity of the hand-stitched seams" that reveal both strength and vulnerability, simultaneously provoking and resisting felt's natural inclination to buckle, stretch, droop, and torque" and the attentiveness and improvisational engineering required to stabilize each work, enabling it to both sit flush with the ground and stand up. "The stitching creates tensions that cause unpredictable distortions on both sides of the seam. Both sides resist. Both are transformed in the joining as the work takes on subtle dimensionalities. The felt, no longer flat, is alive."

In more recent years, as color plays a more significant role in the felt work, and with the introduction of gouache painting into the works on paper, transplanted cutout letters and letter-derived shapes are increasingly prominent, often in combination with the pictogram-like shapes that preceded. As Anne Murray writes, "Carefully cut letters are inlaid into felt that has preserved the hazarded path of scissors, almost perfect rectangles with dangling ends where one imagines a letter was formed by a slicing action. Metaphorically, they appear less scarred than repaired or replaced..." Combinations of letters rarely spell a recognizable word, but instead suggest sounds and the types of breath required to make them.

Mozenter has taught at Pratt Institute (1985-2015), Cooper Union (2001), and at Parsons School of Design (1994-1997).

== Exhibitions and commissions ==
Mozenter has had solo exhibitions at 57W57 Arts, New York; Lesley Heller Gallery, New York; FiveMyles, Brooklyn, New York; Garrison Art Center, Garrison, NY; Adam Baumgold Gallery, New York; Aldrich Contemporary Art Museum, Ridgefield, CT; Dieu Donné Papermill, New York; The Drawing Center, New York; Espaço Cultural Municipal Sérgio Porto, Rio de Janeiro; Jamison Thomas Gallery, New York; and a two person exhibition at Ryugaheon Gallery, Seoul.

Her work has been included in group exhibitions at Lesley Heller Gallery, New York; Joel and Lila Harnett Museum of Art, University of Richmond Museums, Richmond, Virginia; Asheville Art Museum, Asheville, North Carolina; Jeffrey Thomas Gallery, Portland, Oregon; Adam Baumgold Gallery, New York; FiveMyles, Brooklyn, New York; Knoedler Gallery, New York; Rutgers University, Newark, New Jersey; University of Akron, Akron, Ohio; Indiana State University, Terre Haute, Indiana; University of Massachusetts, Amherst, Massachusetts; John Michael Kohler Arts Center, Sheboygan, Wisconsin; Chelsea Art Museum, New York; The Drawing Center, New York; Neuberger Museum of Art, Purchase, New York; Yale Summer School of Music and Art, Norfolk, Connecticut; Aldrich Contemporary Art Museum, Ridgefield, Connecticut; Jamison Thomas Gallery, New York; William Paterson University, Wayne, New Jersey.

In 1995 Mozenter was commissioned to create an installation in conjunction with the Brooklyn Philharmonic Orchestra's Orientalism series for the Majestic Theater at the Brooklyn Academy of Music.

== Grants and fellowships ==
Mozenter is the recipient of a Fellowship from the John Simon Guggenheim Memorial Foundation (2020); Fellowships from the New York Foundation for the Arts (2001, 1986); Project Grants from The Fifth Floor Foundation (2005, 2001); Pratt Institute Faculty Development Grants (2012, 2009, 2001, 1996); Dieu Donné Papermill, Artist Sponsorship Program (2001); and Artists Space Artist Grants (1985, 1988). The Coby Foundation sponsored her solo exhibition at The Aldrich Contemporary Art Museum (2005).

She has been an artist-in-residence at Pianpicollo Selvatico, Alta Lange, Piemonte, Italy (2017); Dieu Donné Papermill, New York (2001); Instituto Municipal de Arte e Cultura, Rioarte, Rio de Janeiro (1995); John Michael Kohler Arts Center, Sheboygan, Wisconsin (1995).

== Public collections ==
- The Arkansas Arts Center
- Birmingham Museum of Art
- Brooklyn Museum of Art
- Brooklyn Museum Libraries and Archives
- CG Jung Center/ARAS
- The Hood Museum of Art
- New Mexico Museum of Art
- New York Public Library Print Collection
- Portland Art Museum
- Pratt Institute Libraries
- The University Gallery, University of Massachusetts
- University of Richmond Museum
- Walker Art Center
- Yale University Art Gallery
