= American politics (political science) =

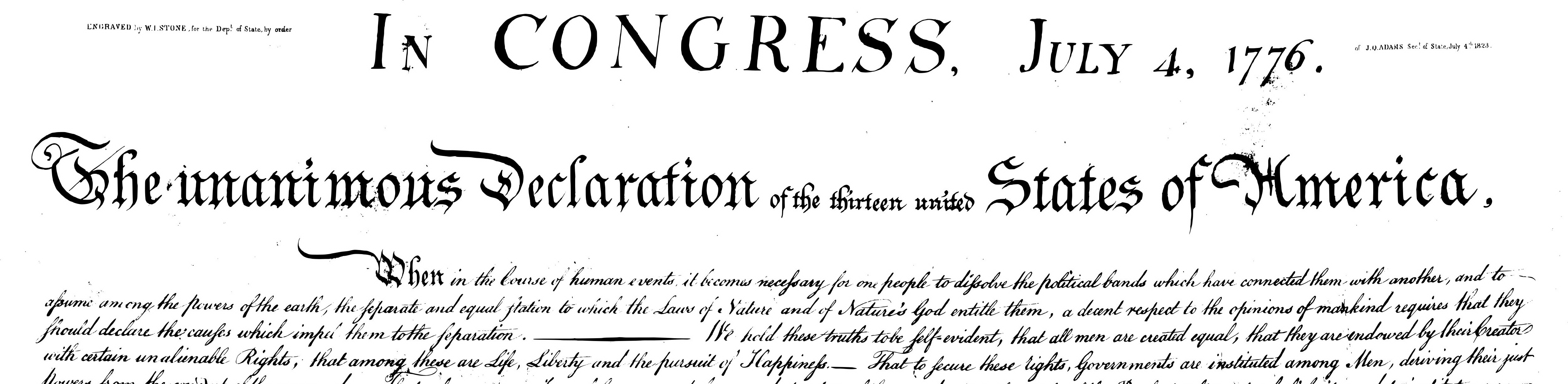
The US declarations of Independence along with the preamble of its constitution

American politics (or American government) is a field of study within the academic discipline of political science. It is primarily, but not exclusively, studied by researchers in the United States. Along with comparative politics, international relations, and political theory, it is one of the major fields of political science that are studied in American academic institutions.

Political scientists studying American politics are sometimes referred to within the discipline as "Americanists". The field is conventionally divided into the sub-fields of political behavior and political institutions. It also consists of other major sub-fields, such as American political development (APD), which do not fit neatly into either category.

Research areas within the American political behavior sub-field include voting behavior, public opinion, partisanship, and the politics of race, gender, and ethnicity. Questions within the study of American political institutions include the legislative behavior and United States Congress, the presidency, courts and the legal process, bureaucracy, public law, state and local politics, and foreign policy. Scholars in American political development focus on determining how American politics has changed over time and what factors (institutional and behavioral) led to these changes. Public policy is also widely studied by Americanists.

In universities outside of the United States, American Politics generally refers to a course in comparative politics or a survey course in American domestics politics for International Relations within political science.
