= Sociology of valuation =

Area of study focusing on tools, models, processes and other aspects of valuation

The sociology of valuation (sometimes "valuation studies") is an emerging area of study focusing on the tools, models, processes, politics, cultural differences and other inputs and outcomes of the different types of valuation practices.

== Current research ==
The area has strong links to both economic sociology, economic anthropology, social accounting and other critical accounting research. Sociology has had a longstanding interest in value and values, which naturally feeds into an examination of the tools and processes of valuation in society. In terms of economic sociology, Viviana Zelizer and the cultural school of economic sociology can be seen as an early precursor to this area of interest, with following work by her students and postdoctoral researchers (e.g. Olav Velthuis in art), along with Patrick Aspers, Jens Beckert, Marion Fourcade, Michele Lamont, Donald MacKenzie, David Stark and many others. Considerably more could be said on the topic about French sociologists, given the longstanding traditions of theorists like Pierre Bourdieu. While the methods of researchers from economic sociology tended to be either qualitative (usually cultural approaches) or quantitative, a different approach came from the critical accounting area, with a focus on accounting models, tools and devices. Here, the theory of market devices was one early precursor to this work, and researchers in this area have been strongly influenced by sociological research in both the US and European schools. Part of this is due to the overlap of work from science and technology studies (STS) and sociology of knowledge, where we again see influences from e.g. Donald MacKenzie and Karin Knorr Cetina, as well as Bruno Latour, Michel Callon and related Paris-Mines innovation school and others, such as Luc Boltanski and Laurent Thévenot.

The area shows growing interest, given a number of books and a degree of institutionalization as a potential subfield shown by the first issue of the academic journal Valuation Studies in 2013, while existing journals in cultural sociology and economic sociology, like Poetics and Socio-Economic Review, show a strong treatment of the topic even before the valuation label came to have a common and recognizable use as a research focus (e.g. specifically used as a keyword in journal article metadata). There is growing interest in the topic in management (e.g. Cattani and Dunbar, and O'Mahoney, Heusinkveld and Wright), particularly in the organization and management theory / organization studies subfield, but also in the area of strategy. One reason is that people working in this area do not solely publish in their own field, but often send papers to accounting, sociology or management in order to find an appropriate home for the specific manuscript. Another reason is people trained in sociology, like Ezra Zuckerman, who now work in management. The growing work on valuation also has clear links to existing lines of research in management, such as work on ratings, rankings and prizes, which taps into existing research interests, as well as with evaluation. Finally, there is a growing interest in examining how different things are turned into assets, or assetized, involving forms of capitalization and valuation.

== Early work ==
In terms of early work, one might argue that Zelizer's 1978 "Human Values and the Market" article, published in the American Journal of Sociology, was an early example of work on valuation, although it is also a core work in the cultural economic sociology tradition. The integration of an STS mentality that focuses on the tools and organizational processes of valuation is clearly realized in Fourcade's 2011 article comparing valuation practices between France and the US. We also see an interest in values and valuation in classical sociological work, such as Weber's Economy and Society.

== Sociology of valuation vs. Typical valuation research ==
There is a difference between the sociology of valuation from the more typical valuation research which occurs in finance and mainstream accounting. A key difference is that the sociology of valuation takes valuation practices, inputs and outcomes as the object of the study. In contrast, valuation work in finance and accounting often has a narrower focus (e.g. solving a specific problem) and is typically more practical and concentrated on the actual processes and results of calculation, with less interest in the social and organizational inputs, social processes, social and organizational implications of valuation.

== See also ==
- Art valuation
- Economic sociology
- Social studies of finance
