= Ann Morning =

American sociologist (born 1968)

- Born: Ann Juanita Morning; June 1, 1968 (age 58)
- Education: Yale University (B.A., Economics & Political Science 1990); Columbia University (Master of International Affairs, 1992); Princeton University (M.A. 2000, and Ph.D. 2004)
- Awards: 2009 Oliver Cromwell Cox Article Award from the American Sociological Association Section for Racial and Ethnic Minorities;
- Scientific career
- Fields: Sociology
- Doctoral advisors: Marta Tienda, Michèle Lamont and Elizabeth M. Armstrong

Ann Juanita Morning is an American sociologist and demographer whose research focuses on race. In particular, she has studied racial and ethnic classification on censuses worldwide, as well as beliefs about racial difference in the United States and Western Europe. Much of her work examines how contemporary science—particularly the field of genetics—influences how we conceptualize race.

== Education ==
Morning received her primary- and secondary-school education at the United Nations International School in New York City, where she graduated with an International Baccalaureate in 1986. She then earned her B.A. in Economics and Political Science at Yale University in 1990. As an undergraduate she also studied in Paris at the Institut d'Etudes Politiques and Université de Paris III (Censier-Daubenton) during the 1988–89 academic year. In 1992, she earned a master's in international affairs from Columbia University's School of International and Public Affairs (SIPA), and then a Ph.D. in sociology in 2004 at Princeton University, where she was affiliated with the Office of Population Research.

== Career ==
Morning began her career in 1992 as an economist at the Federal Reserve Bank of New York, where she monitored the external debt burden of a portfolio of less-industrialized nations. In 1994, she joined the U.S. Department of State as a Foreign Service Officer, serving as Vice Consul at the U.S. Embassy in Tegucigalpa, Honduras and completed a temporary tour of duty at the U.S. Mission to the United Nations in New York.

She left the Foreign Service in late 1995 to become an assistant dean for academic affairs at her former graduate school, Columbia University's School of International and Public Affairs (SIPA). She remained at SIPA until beginning her doctoral studies at Princeton in the fall of 1997.

At Princeton, Morning was a student at the Office of Population Research, and her first research projects focused on the uses of racial classification in demographic data like censuses. In particular, she undertook quantitative analyses of the classification of groups that did not easily fit traditional American racial categories, such as mixed-race people and people of South Asian descent. With time, she developed an interest in individuals' beliefs about the nature of racial difference, using the term "racial conceptualization" to get at the web of their interrelated beliefs about which groups constituted races, what demarcated them from each other, how they emerged, and how an individual's membership in a racial group could be ascertained. Her doctoral dissertation explored such concepts using qualitative data, and went on to win the American Sociological Association's Dissertation Award in 2005. In 2011, it was published by the University of California Press as The Nature of Race: How Scientists Think and Teach about Human Difference.

While finishing up her doctoral dissertation, Morning worked as a consultant to the U.S. Census Bureau, gathering and analyzing data on census racial and ethnic enumeration on nearly 140 nations around the globe. After earning her doctorate in 2004, she joined New York University's Department of Sociology as an Assistant Professor, and was promoted to Associate Professor in 2011. In the fall of 2023, Morning was named James Weldon Johnson Professor of Sociology. Since 2012, Morning has also been an Affiliated Faculty Member at NYU's Abu Dhabi campus, teaching there regularly, and in 2019 she was appointed the Academic Director at 19 Washington Square North, NYUAD's offices in New York. From 2013 to 2019, she served on the U.S. Census Bureau's National Advisory Committee on Racial, Ethnic and Other Populations. And in 2019, she was a Visiting Professor at the Observatoire sociologique du changement at SciencesPo in Paris.

Ann Morning continues to work on racial classification, racial conceptualization, and their intersection. A Fulbright scholarship to the University of Milan-Bicocca in 2008-09 resulted in her book investigating Italians' beliefs about ethnic and racial difference, entitled An Ugly Word: Rethinking Race in Italy and the United States, co-authored with sociologist Marcello Maneri of the University of Milan-Bicocca, and published in 2022 by the Russell Sage Foundation. She has also explored contemporary debates about the bases of racial membership in the 2017 article "Kaleidoscope." With demographer Aliya Saperstein (Stanford University), she has published research on the racial self-identification of mixed-race Americans that points to the roles of gender and the genealogical locus of multiraciality, meaning how far back in an individual's family tree it originates.

An important dimension of Morning's research remains the connection between genetic discourse and everyday concepts of racial difference. She has collaborated with Alondra Nelson (deputy director, White House Office of Science and Technology Policy, and former president, Social Science Research Council) and Hannah Brückner (NYU Abu Dhabi) on the study of socially-desirable reporting of beliefs about biological differences between races, and has repeatedly challenged the notion that racial groups are objective biological entities as opposed to human inventions or social constructs. From 2022 to 2023, Morning served on the National Academies of Sciences, Engineering, and Medicine's Committee on the Use of Race, Ethnicity, and Ancestry as Population Descriptors in Genomics Research.

On September 1, 2023, Morning became the Arts & Science divisional dean for social sciences and vice dean for global and strategic initiatives at NYU.

== Awards ==
- 2017 New York University "Golden Dozen" Teaching Award
- 2009 Oliver Cromwell Cox Article Award from the American Sociological Association Section for Racial and Ethnic Minorities
- 2005 Co-Recipient, American Sociological Association Dissertation Award
- 2001 Association of Black Princeton Alumni Patrice Y. Johnson *80 Memorial Award

== Selected bibliography ==
=== Books ===
- ·Morning, Ann, and Marcello Maneri. 2022. An Ugly Word: Rethinking Race in Italy and the United States. New York: Russell Sage Foundation.
- Morning, Ann. 2011. The Nature of Race: How Scientists Think and Teach about Human Difference. Berkeley, CA: University of California Press.

=== Selected articles ===
- Xu, Janet, Aliya Saperstein, Ann Morning, and Sarah Iverson. 2021. "Gender, Generation and Multiracial Identification in the United States." Demography 58(5): 1603–1630. (Lead article.)
- Morning, Ann, Hannah Brückner, and Alondra Nelson. 2019. "Socially Desirable Reporting and the Expression of Biological Concepts of Race." Du Bois Review 16(2).
- Morning, Ann, and Aliya Saperstein. 2018. "The Generational Locus of Multiraciality and its Implications for Racial Self-Identification." Annals of the American Academy of Political and Social Science 677(1): 57–68.
- Morning, Ann. 2017. "Kaleidoscope: Contested Identities and New Forms of Race Membership." Ethnic and Racial Studies 41(6): 1–19.
- Morning, Ann. 2014. "Does Genomics Challenge the Social Construction of Race?" Sociological Theory 32(3): 189–207. (Lead article.)
- Gullickson, Aaron, and Ann Morning. 2011. "Choosing Race: Multiracial Ancestry and Identification." Social Science Research 40: 498–512.
- Morning, Ann. 2009. "Toward a Sociology of Racial Conceptualization for the 21st Century." Social Forces 87(3): 1-26. To be reprinted in Terrains/Théorie, September 2015.
- Morning, Ann. 2008. "Reconstructing Race in Science and Society: Biology Textbooks, 1952-2002." American Journal of Sociology 114(s1): S106-S137. Winner, 2009 Oliver Cromwell Cox Article Award from the American Sociological Association Section for Racial and Ethnic Minorities, for the best research article in the sociological study of race and ethnicity.
- Morning, Ann. 2008. "Ethnic Classification in Global Perspective: A Cross-National Survey of the 2000 Census Round." Population Research and Policy Review 27(2): 239–272.
- Bolnick, Deborah A., Duana Fullwiley, Troy Duster, Richard S. Cooper, Joan H. Fujimura, Jonathan Kahn, Jay Kaufman, Jonathan Marks, Ann Morning, Alondra Nelson, Pilar Ossorio, Jenny Reardon, Susan M. Reverby, and Kimberly TallBear. 2007. "The Science and Business of Genetic Ancestry Testing." Science, October 19: 399–400.
- Morning, Ann. 2001. "The Racial Self-Identification of South Asians in the United States." Journal of Ethnic and Migration Studies 27(1): 61–79.
- Goldstein, Joshua, and Ann Morning. 2000. "The Multiple-Race Population of the United States: Issues and Estimates." Proceedings of the National Academy of Sciences 97(11): 6230–6235.
- Morning, Ann. 2000. "Who Is Multiracial? Definitions and Decisions." Sociological Imagination 37(4): 209–229.
