= Peter Bearman =

American sociologist

- Born: 1956 (age 69–70)
- Awards: Guggenheim Fellowship (2016); Golden Goose Award (2016)

Academic background
- Education: Brown University (BA); Harvard University (PhD)

Academic work
- Discipline: Sociology
- Institutions: University of North Carolina at Chapel Hill; Columbia University

Peter Shawn Bearman (born 1956) is an American sociologist, notable for his contributions to adolescent health, research design, structural analysis, textual analysis, oral history, and social networks.

He is the Jonathan R. Cole Professor of Social Science in the Department of Sociology at Columbia University, the President of The American Assembly at Columbia University, as well as the director of the Incite Institute (Incite https://incite.columbia.edu/). He is also the founding director of the Institute for Social and Economic Research and Policy, and co-founding director of Columbia's Oral History Master of Arts Program, the first oral history masters program in the country. He was elected a Fellow of the American Academy of Arts and Sciences in 2008, a member of the National Academy of Sciences in 2014, a Guggenheim Fellow in 2016, and a member of the National Academy of Medicine in 2019. Bearman was awarded the Kohli Prize in Sociology in 2025.

== Career ==
Bearman received his B.A. in sociology from Brown University in 1978, magna cum laude, and his M.A. (1982) and Ph.D. (1985) in sociology from Harvard University.

After receiving his PhD, he was a lecturer at Harvard, before joining the sociology department at University of North Carolina at Chapel Hill. There he moved from assistant professor to full professor by 1996, before moving to Columbia University in 1997. At Columbia, Bearman was chair of the department of sociology from 2001 to 2005 and chair of the department of statistics from 2007 to 2008. Between 2002 and 2003, he was a visiting professor at the University of Genoa (Italy), LMU Munich. He has chaired over 60 doctoral dissertations.

Bearman was the founding director of the Institute for Social and Economic Research and Policy, and is currently the director of INCITE, the Interdisciplinary Center for Innovative Theory and Empirics at Columbia University. He was also co-founding director of Columbia's Oral History Master of Arts program and co-founding director of the Global Health Research Center in Central Asia.

He is currently co-editor of the Oral History Series and the Middle Range Series, both published by Columbia University Press. He has also been on the editorial board of several scholarly journals, including the American Journal of Sociology, Social Forces, and Sociological Theory.

== Major contributions ==
Bearman, along with J. Richard Udry, designed the National Longitudinal Study of Adolescent Health (Add Health), currently the only nationally representative study of adolescent sexuality in the United States, which has yielded over a thousand published research articles and received the 2016 Golden Goose Award.

From these data, Bearman has published seminal articles on the sexual network, virginity pledges, same sex attraction, and adolescent suicidality. He is widely credited with bringing social network analysis methods to the demographic and population research community. He also introduced social network approaches to social sequence analysis through the concept of narrative networks. Bearman currently directs the Robert Wood Johnson Program in population health at Columbia University. He has received major grants and contracts from the National Science Foundation, the American Legacy Foundation, the Office of Population Affairs National Institutes of Health, the National Institute of Child Health and Development, The Andrew Mellon Foundation, the Russell Sage Foundation, the Robert Wood Johnson Foundation, and the Rockefeller Foundation, totaling over $20,000,000.

With co-authors Katherine Stovel, and James Moody, Bearman received the A Roger V. Gould Prize in 2004 for his article "Chains of Affection: The Structure of Adolescent Romantic and Sexual Networks." The editorial board of the American Journal of Sociology selects one article published in the journal for a two-year period. They award the prize to an article that is "empirically rigorous, theoretically grounded, and lucidly written."

In 2007, Bearman was awarded the National Institute of Health (NIH) Director's Pioneer Award to investigated the social determinants of the autism epidemic.

Bearman is the author of Doormen (University of Chicago Press, 2005), an ethnographic study of doormen in New York City, and is the co-author of Working for Respect: Community and Conflict at Walmart with Adam Reich (Columbia University Press, 2018). He is also co-editor of After the Fall, an oral history documenting New Yorkers' recollections of the September 11 attacks, as well as Robert Rauschenberg: An Oral History, which is to be published in 2019.

== Publications ==
=== Books ===
- Robert Rauschenberg: An Oral History. Columbia University Press. 2019, eds. Sara Sinclair, Peter Bearman and Mary Marshall Clark.
- Working for Respect. Columbia University Press. 2018, Adam Reich and Peter Bearman
- Handbook of Analytical Sociology. Oxford University Press, 2009 Peter Hedstrom and Peter Bearman (eds).
- Doormen. University of Chicago Press, 2005
  - Review by Ezra Zuckerman Administrative Science Quarterly.: March 2008. Vol.53; pg. 194, 3 pgs
  - Review, "All Visitors Must Be Announced" Judith Martin, New York Times Book Review; Dec 4, 2005;
  - Review, Publishers Weekly. New York: Aug 29, 2005. Vol. 252, Iss. 34; p. 51 (1 page)
  - Review "Modeling Ethnography" by Harvey Molotch. Contemporary Sociology.: May 2006. Vol.35, Iss. 3; pg. 234, 3 pgs
- Relations into Rhetorics: Local Elite Social Structure in Norfolk, England: 1540-1640 American Sociological Association, Rose Monograph Series. Rutgers University Press, 1993.

Reviewed in: European Sociological Review (Symposium), JASS, Philosophy of the Social Sciences, Revista, Sociologica, Acta Sociological, Contemporary Sociology

=== Peer-reviewed articles ===
The most recent among his 60+ peer-reviewed articles are:

- 2020 Lee, Byungkyu, and Peter Bearman*. Political Isolation in America. Network Science 8(3): 333-355. https://doi.org/10.1017/nws.2020.9.
- 2019 Green, Sharon H., Charlotte Wang, Swethaa S. Ballakrishnen, Hannah Brueckner and Peter Bearman*. Patterned remittances enhance women's health-related autonomy. SSM - Population Health. 9, 100370. https://doi.org/10.1016/j.ssmph.2019.100370.
- 2018 Zerubavel, Noam, Mark Hoffman, Adam Reich, Kevin Ochsner and Peter Bearman*. Neural Precursors of Future Liking and its Mutual Reciprocation. Proceedings of the National Academy of Sciences. https://doi.org/10.1073/pnas.1802176115. 29632195 (PubMed)
- 2018 Balian, Hrag and Peter Bearman*. Pathways to Violence: Dynamics for the Continuation of Large-Scale Conflict. Sociological Theory. 36 (2), 210–220
- 2018 Hoffman, Mark, JP Cointet, Phiipp Brandt, Newton E. Key, and Peter Bearman*. The (Protestant) Bible, the (Printed) Sermon, and the Word(s): The Semantic Structure of the Conformist and Dissenting Bible, 1660-1780. Poetics. Volume 68, June 2018, Pages 89–103 (American Sociological Association Religion Section Distinguished Article Award, 2018)
- 2018 Bearman, Peter. Notes for Heuristics of Discovery. Sociologica. 12 (1), 13–19
- 2017 King, Marissa; Bearman, Peter S (2017). "Gifts and influence: Conflict of interest policies and prescribing of psychotropic medications in the United States". Social Science & Medicine. 172: 153–162. doi:10.1016/j.socscimed.2016.11.010. PMC 5154797. PMID 27856120.
- 2016 Lee, Byungkyu; Bearman, Peter (2017). "Important Matters in Political Context". Sociological Science. 4: 1–30. doi:10.15195/v4.a1.
- 2016 Makovi, Kinga; Winter, Alix; Liu, Ka-Yuet; Bearman, Peter (2015). "The Population Level Impacts of Differential Fertility Behavior of Parents of Children with Autism". Sociological Science. 2: 398–419. doi:10.15195/v2.a19.
- 2015 Zerubavel, Noam; Bearman, Peter S; Weber, Jochen; Ochsner, Kevin N (2015). "Neural mechanisms tracking popularity in real-world social networks". Proceedings of the National Academy of Sciences. 112 (49): 15072–7. Bibcode:2015PNAS..11215072Z. doi:10.1073/pnas.1511477112. PMC 4679039. PMID 26598684.
- 2015 Rule, Alix; Cointet, Jean-Philippe; Bearman, Peter S (2015). "Lexical shifts, substantive changes, and continuity in State of the Union discourse, 1790–2014". Proceedings of the National Academy of Sciences. 112 (35): 10837–44. Bibcode:2015PNAS..11210837R. doi:10.1073/pnas.1512221112. PMC 4568240. PMID 26261302.
- 2015 Cheslack-Postava, Keely; Susser, Ezra; Liu, Kayuet; Bearman, Peter S (2015). "Can Sibling Sex Ratios Be Used as a Valid Test for the Prenatal Androgen Hypothesis of Autism Spectrum Disorders?". PLOS ONE. 10 (10) e0141338. Bibcode:2015PLoSO..1041338C. doi:10.1371/journal.pone.0141338. PMC 4619748. PMID 26495967.
- 2015 Makovi, Kinga; Winter, Alix; Liu, Ka-Yuet; Bearman, Peter (2015). "The Population Level Impacts of Differential Fertility Behavior of Parents of Children with Autism". Sociological Science. 2: 398–419. doi:10.15195/v2.a19.
- 2015 Fountain, Christine; Zhang, Yujia; Kissin, Dmitry M; Schieve, Laura A; Jamieson, Denise J; Rice, Catherine; Bearman, Peter (2015). "Association Between Assisted Reproductive Technology Conception and Autism in California, 1997–2007". American Journal of Public Health. 105 (5): 963–71. doi:10.2105/AJPH.2014.302383. PMC 4386543. PMID 25790396.
- 2015 Hoffman, Mark; Bearman, Peter (2015). "Bringing Anomie Back In: Exceptional Events and Excess Suicide". Sociological Science. 2: 186–210. doi:10.15195/v2.a10.
- 2015 Schieve, L. A; Fountain, C; Boulet, S. L; Yeargin-Allsopp, M; Kissin, D. M; Jamieson, D. J; Rice, C; Bearman, P (2015). "Does Autism Diagnosis Age or Symptom Severity Differ Among Children According to Whether Assisted Reproductive Technology was Used to Achieve Pregnancy?". Journal of Autism and Developmental Disorders. 45 (9): 2991–3003. doi:10.1007/s10803-015-2462-1. PMC 4553150. PMID 25997596.
- 2014 Kissin, DM*, Yujia Zhang, Christine Fountain, Peter Bearman and LA. Schieve. Association of Assisted Reproductive Technology (ART) Treatment and Parental Infertility Diagnosis With Autism in ART-Conceived Children". Human Reproduction. 30(2):454-65
- 2013 Hagen, Ryan, Kinga Makovi, and Peter Bearman* "The Influence of Political Dynamics on Southern Lynch Mob Formation and Lethality. Social forces 92 (2), 757-787.
- 2013 King, Marissa, Connor Essick, Peter Bearman*, and Joseph S. Ross. "Medical school gift restriction policies and physician prescribing of newly marketed psychotropic medications: difference-in-differences analysis." BMJ: British Medical Journal 346 (2013).
- 2013 Bearman. Peter*. "Genes Can Point to Environments That Matter to Advance Public Health. American Journal of Public Health: October 2013, Vol. 103, No. S1, pp. S11-S13.
- 2013 Hansen, Helena*, Zoe Donaldson, Bruce Link, Peter Bearman et al. "Independent Review Of Social And Population Variation In Mental Health Could Improve Diagnosis In DSM Revisions"." Health Affairs. 32, NO. 5
- 2012 Liu, Kayuet; Bearman, Peter S (2012). "Focal Points, Endogenous Processes, and Exogenous Shocks in the Autism Epidemic". Sociological Methods & Research. 44 (2): 272–305. doi:10.1177/0049124112460369. PMC 4495771. PMID 26166907.
- 2012 Mazumdar, Soumya; Winter, Alix; Liu, Ka-Yuet; Bearman, Peter (2013). "Spatial clusters of autism births and diagnoses point to contextual drivers of increased prevalence". Social Science & Medicine. 95: 87–96. doi:10.1016/j.socscimed.2012.11.032. PMC 3612561. PMID 23267775.
- 2012 Mazumdar, Soumya; Liu, Ka-Yuet; Susser, Ezra; Bearman, Peter (2012). "The Disappearing Seasonality of Autism Conceptions in California". PLOS ONE. 7 (7) e41265. Bibcode:2012PLoSO...741265M. doi:10.1371/journal.pone.0041265. PMC 3408493. PMID 22859972.
- 2012 Fountain, Christine, Alix Winter, and Peter S. Bearman*. "Dynamic Trajectories of Children with Autism." Pediatrics. 129(5):e111-e112
- 2012 Bearman, Peter. "On analytical sociology." Sociologica. 6.1.
- 2011 Cheslack-Postava, Keely, Kayuet Liu, and Peter S. Bearman*. "Closely Spaced Pregnancies are Associated with Increased Odds of Autism in Sibling Births." Pediatrics. 127(2): 246–253.
- 2011 Fountain, Christine and Peter Bearman*. "Risk as Social Context: Immigration Policy and Autism in California." Sociological Forum. 26(2): 215–240.
- 2011 Keyes, Kerry, Ezra Susser, Keely Cheslak-Postava, Christine Fountain, Ka-Yuet Liu, Soumya Mazumdar, and Peter Bearman*. "Age, Period, and Cohort Effects in Autism Incidence in California from 1994 to 2005." International Journal of Epidemiology. 2011; doi:10.1093/ije/dyr193
- 2011 King, Marissa D. and Peter S. Bearman*. "Socioeconomic Status and the Increased Prevalence of Autism in California." American Sociological Review. 76(2): 320–346.
- 2010 Fountain, Christine, Marissa D. King, and Peter S. Bearman*. "Age of Diagnosis for Autism: Individual and Community Factors across 10 Birth Cohorts." Journal of Epidemiology and Community Health. 65(6): 503–510.
- 2010 Shwed, Uri* and Peter S. Bearman*. "The Temporal Structure of Scientific Consensus Formation." American Sociological Review. 75(6): 817–840.

(Best Article, ISS Paper Competition, 2010-12)

- Bearman, Peter S. "Just So Stories: Vaccines, Autism, and the Single-Bullet Disorder". Social Psychological Quarterly. 2010.
- Mazumdar, Soumya, Marissa King, Noam Zerubavel and Peter S. Bearman. "The Spatial Structure of Autism". Health and Place. 16.539-546.
- Liu, Kayuet, Noam Zerubavel, and Peter S. Bearman. "Demographic Change and the Increasing Prevalence of Autism". Demography. 2010
- Liu, Ka-Yuet, Marissa * King and Peter S. Bearman. "Social Influence and the Autism Epidemic". American Journal of Sociology. March, 2010
- King, Marissa and Peter S. Bearman. "Diagnostic Change and the Increasing Prevalence of Autism". International Journal of Epidemiology. 38: 1224–1234
- Bearman, Peter and Marissa King. "Diagnostic Accretion: Reply to Commentary" International Journal of Epidemiology. 38: 1243–1244
- King, Marissa, Christine Fountain, Diana Dakhallah and Peter Bearman. "Estimating Autism Risk in a Time of Increasing Reproductive Age" American Journal of Public Health. 99(9):1673-1679.
- Parigi, Paolo and Peter S. Bearman. "Spaghetti Politics: The Structure of the Italian Political System, 1986-2002. Social Forces 87:2:623-651
- Baldassarri, Delia and Peter S. Bearman. "The Dynamics of Polarization" American Sociological Review. V72, N5: 784–812. (Awarded Mathematical Sociology Prize for Best Article)
- Weiss, Christopher and Peter S. Bearman. "Fresh Starts: School Form and Student Outcomes". American Journal of Education. (May, 2007).
- Erikson, Emily and Peter S. Bearman. "Routes into Networks: The Structure of English East Indian Trade, 1600-1831". American Journal of Sociology 112(1):195-230. (2006)
- Brückner, Hannah and Peter S. Bearman. "After the Promise: The STD Consequences of Adolescent Virginity Pledges". Journal of Adolescent Health 36:271-278
- Bearman, Peter S. and Paolo Parigi. "Cloning Headless Frogs and Other Important Matters: Conversation Topics and Network Structure". Social Forces. 83 (2): 535-557 (2004)
- Brückner, Hannah, Anne Martin and Peter S. Bearman. "Ambivalence and Pregnancy: Adolescent Attitudes, Contraception, and Pregnancy". Perspectives on Sexual and Reproductive Health. 36 (6): 248-257 (2004)
- Bearman, Peter S, James Moody and Katherine Stovel. "Chains of Affection: The Structure of Adolescent Romantic and Sexual Networks". American Journal of Sociology. Vol. 110.1.44-91 (2004) (Awarded Roger V. Gould Prize; AJS 2004–05
- Bearman, Peter S. and Brückner, Hannah. "Promising the Future: Virginity Pledges and First Intercourse" American Journal of Sociology, 106, 4, p. 859- (2001)

=== Popular articles ===
- "Hooking Up" Peter Bearman, James Moody, Katherine Stovel. Harper's Magazine. New York: Jun 2005. Vol. 310, Iss. 1861; p. 22-

=== Major reports from his longitudinal studies ===
- 2004 Bearman, Peter, Katherine Stovel, James Moody, and Lisa Thalji. "The Structure of Sexual Networks and the National Longitudinal Study of Adolescent Health", in Network Epidemiology: A Handbook For Survey Design and Data Collection. Martina Morris (ed.). Oxford: Oxford University Press.
- 2003 Brückner, H and Peter S Bearman . Dating Behavior and Sexual Activity Among Young Adolescents, in Albert, William, Sarah Brown and Christine Flanagan (ed) Fourteen and Younger: The Sexual Behavior of Young Adolescents. National Campaign To Prevent Teen Pregnancy. Washington, D.C.
- 1999 Bearman, Peter S. and Hannah Brückner. Power in Numbers: Peer Effects on Adolescent Girls' Sexual Debut and Pregnancy. National Campaign to Prevent Teen Pregnancy: Research Monographs. Washington, D.C.
- 1999 Bearman, Peter S, and Hannah Brückner. "Peer Effects on Adolescent Girls' Sexual Debut and Pregnancy: An Analysis of a National Sample of Adolescent Girls", in Peer Potential: Making the Most of How Teens Influence Each Other. National Campaign to Prevent Teen Pregnancy. Washington, D.C.
- 1998 Bearman, Peter S. and Hannah Brückner. "Peer Effects on Adolescent Girls' Sexual Debut and Pregnancy Risk". PPFY Network, Vol2. No3.
- 1998 Bearman, Peter S and Laura Burns. "Adolescents, Health and School: Early Findings From the National Longitudinal Study of Adolescent Health." NASSP Bulletin. Vol. 82:601-23.
- 1997 Udry, J. Richard and Peter S. Bearman. "New Methods for New Perspectives on Adolescent Sexual Behavior". In Richard Jessor (ed). New Perspectives on Adolescent Sexual Behavior. Cambridge University Press.
- 1997 Bearman, PS., J. Jones, and J. R. Udry. "Connections Count: Adolescent Health and the Design of the National Longitudinal Study of Adolescent Health."
