= Ann Swidler =

American sociologist

- Born: December 11, 1944 (age 81)

Academic background
- Education: Harvard University; University of California, Berkeley
- Thesis: Organization Without Authority (1975)
- Doctoral advisor: Arlie Russell Hochschild
- Influences: Robert N. Bellah; Reinhard Bendix; Neil Smelser

Academic work
- Discipline: Sociology
- Sub-discipline: Cultural sociology; mathematical sociology; sociological theory
- Doctoral students: Mounira M. Charrad; John Levi Martin
- Notable students: Wendy Griswold; Lynette Spillman; Philip Gorski
- Notable works: Habits of the Heart (1985); "Culture in Action" (1986); Inequality by Design (1996); Talk of Love (2001)

Ann Swidler (born December 11, 1944) is an American sociologist and professor of sociology at the University of California, Berkeley. Swidler is most commonly known as a cultural sociologist and authored one of the most-cited articles in sociology, "Culture in Action: Symbols and Strategies".

== Early life and career ==
Swidler was born on December 11, 1944. She was raised in Knoxville, Tennessee. Her father was an attorney with the Tennessee Valley Authority and her mother was a secretary. Her family, which is Jewish, experienced anti-Semitism in Tennessee.

She began studies at Radcliffe College (at the time, the women's part of Harvard University) in the fall of 1962. She graduated from Harvard University with a Bachelor of Arts degree in 1966 and received her Master of Arts degree in 1971 and Doctor of Philosophy degree in 1975 from the University of California, Berkeley. Her dissertation was titled Organization Without Authority: A Study of Two Alternative Schools, it was published as a book in 1979 as Organization Without Authority: Dilemmas of Social Control in Free Schools. Her advisor was Arlie Hochschild, and was also mentored by Robert N. Bellah, Reinhard Bendix, and Neil Smelser.

In 1982 she was a recipient of the John Simon Guggenheim Memorial Foundation Fellowship. With sociologists John W. Meyer and W. Richard Scott, Swidler received funding from the Russell Sage Foundation for "Due Process in Organizations", and in 2009–10 she was a Russell Sage Foundation Visiting Scholar. In 2013 she was elected to the American Academy of Arts and Sciences.

== Major works ==
Habits of the Heart (1985), co-authored with Robert Bellah, Richard Madsen, William M. Sullivan, and Steven M. Tipton, was finalist for a Pulitzer Prize in 1986, won the Los Angeles Times Book Award in 1985 and received Highest Honors for a Book in Education from the American Educational Studies Association. Habits of the Heart sold over 500,000 copies which, according to sociologist Edward Tiryakian, places the work among "that rare breed of sociological works: a literary event, with sales figures beyond the total number of practicing sociologists in the world, past and present."

"Culture in Action: Symbols and Strategies" (1986), argues that rather than just a form of internalized norms controlling behavior—argued by, for instance, Talcott Parsons—culture is a collection or "tool-kit" that people draw on to accomplish particular strategies of action. This is one of the most widely cited articles in sociology and informs the contemporary view in cultural sociology that culture is both constraining and enabling.

Inequality by Design: Cracking the Bell Curve Myth (1996), is a well-known reply to The Bell Curve by Charles Murray and Richard Hernstein and attempts to show that the arguments in The Bell Curve are flawed.

Talk of Love: How Culture Matters (2001) attempts to describe the reality of love in relationships amid the idealized and romanticized "talk of love" within American culture. In a review in the American Journal of Sociology, sociologist Michèle Lamont describes the book as "theoretically ambitious" as it "propose[s] nothing less than the reconceptualization of the role that culture plays in organizing social action."

== See also ==
- Social network analysis
