= Nigel Dodd =

British sociologist (1965–2022)

- Born: Nigel B. Dodd; 1965
- Died: August 12, 2022 (aged 56–57)

Academic background
- Education: University of Cambridge
- Thesis: Money in Social Theory (1991)
- Doctoral advisor: Anthony Giddens

Academic work
- Discipline: Sociology
- Sub-discipline: Economic sociology; social theory
- Institutions: University of Liverpool; London School of Economics

Nigel B. Dodd (1965–2022) was a British sociologist. Dodd earned a doctorate from the University of Cambridge in 1991, and began his teaching career as a lecturer at University of Liverpool. He moved to the London School of Economics in 1995. He was the editor-in-chief of the British Journal of Sociology since 2014. Dodd was co-editor (with Patrik Aspers) of Re-Imagining Economic Sociology (2015) and volume six of A Cultural History of Money (series editor: Bill Maurer) with Federico Neiburg (2019).

Dodd died on 12 August 2022. At the time of his death he was working on two book projects. The first, Images of Time, considered the sociology of time of Walter Benjamin ('messianic time') and Michel Foucault ('heterogenous time'). The second, Utopianism and the Future of Money, considered the prospects for monetary reform.

== Works ==
- The Sociology of Money : Economics, reason and contemporary society. Polity, 1994.
- Social Theory and Modernity. Polity, 1999.
- The Social Life of Money. Princeton University Press, 2014.
- (ed. with Patrik Aspers) Re-Imagining Economic Sociology. Oxford University Press, 2015.
- (ed. with Judy Wajcman) The Sociology of Speed: digital, organizational, and social temporalities. Oxford University Press, 2016.
