= Sociology of culture =

Branch of sociology

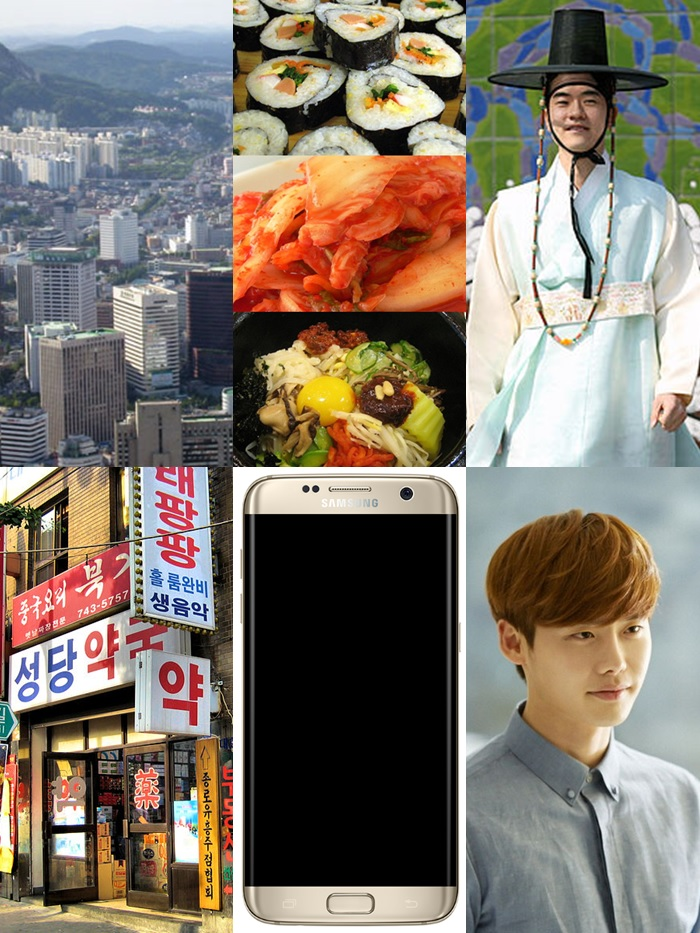
Various aspects of Korean culture

The sociology of culture, and the related field of cultural sociology, concern the systematic analysis of culture, usually understood as the ensemble of symbolic codes used by members of a society, as they are expressed within the context of that society. According to Georg Simmel, culture referred to "the cultivation of individuals through the agency of external forms which have been objectified in the course of history". In the sociological field, culture is defined as the ways in which individuals think, communicate, and behave, as well as the tangible artifacts that collectively influence a community's way of life.

Contemporary sociologists' approach to culture is often divided between a "sociology of culture" and "cultural sociology". The terms are similar, though not interchangeable. The sociology of culture is an older concept, and it considers some topics and objects as more or less "cultural" than others. In contrast, Jeffrey C. Alexander introduced the term cultural sociology, an approach that sees all, or most, social phenomena as inherently cultural at some level. For instance, a leading proponent of the "strong program" in cultural sociology, Alexander argues: "To believe in the possibility of cultural sociology is to subscribe to the idea that every action, no matter how instrumental, reflexive, or coerced [compared to] its external environment, is embedded to some extent in a horizon of affect and meaning." In terms of analysis, sociology of culture often attempts to explain some discretely cultural phenomena as a product of social processes, while cultural sociology sees culture as a component of explanations of social phenomena. As opposed to the field of cultural studies, cultural sociology does not reduce all human matters to a problem of cultural encoding and decoding. For instance, Pierre Bourdieu's cultural sociology has a "clear recognition of the social and the economic as categories which are interlinked with, but not reducible to, the cultural."

== Development ==
Cultural sociology first emerged in Weimar, Germany, where sociologists such as Alfred Weber used the term Kultursoziologie (cultural sociology). Cultural sociology was then "reinvented" in the English-speaking world as a product of the "cultural turn" of the 1960s, which ushered in structuralist and postmodern approaches to social science. This type of cultural sociology may loosely be regarded as an approach incorporating cultural analysis and critical theory. In the beginning of the cultural turn, sociologists tended to use qualitative methods and hermeneutic approaches to research, focusing on meanings, words, artifacts and symbols. "Culture" has since become an important concept across many branches of sociology, including historically quantitative and model-based subfields, such as social stratification and social network analysis.

=== Early researchers ===
The sociology of culture grew from the intersection between sociology, as shaped by early theorists like Marx, Durkheim, and Weber, and anthropology where researchers pioneered ethnographic strategies for describing and analyzing a variety of cultures around the world. Part of the legacy of the early development of the field is still felt in the methods (much of cultural sociological research is qualitative) in the theories (a variety of critical approaches to sociology are central to current research communities) and substantive focus of the field. For instance, relationships between popular culture, political control, and social class were early and lasting concerns in the field.

==== Karl Marx ====
As a major contributor to conflict theory, Marx argued that culture served to justify inequality. The ruling class, or the bourgeoisie, produce a culture that promotes their interests, while repressing the interests of the proletariat. His most famous line to this effect is that "Religion is the opium of the people". Marx believed that the "engine of history" was the struggle between groups of people with diverging economic interests and thus the economy determined the cultural superstructure of values and ideologies. For this reason, Marx is a considered a materialist as he believes that the economic (material) produces the cultural (ideal), which "stands Hegel on his head," who argued the ideal produced the material.

==== Émile Durkheim ====
Durkheim held the belief that culture has many relationships to society which include:

- Logical – Power over individuals belongs to certain cultural categories, and beliefs such as in God.
- Functional – Certain rites and myths create and build up social order by having more people create strong beliefs. The greater the number of people who believe strongly in these myths more will the social order be strengthened.
- Historical – Culture had its origins in society, and from those experiences came evolution into things such as classification systems.

==== Max Weber ====
Weber innovated the idea of a status group as a certain type of subculture. Status groups are based on things such as: race, ethnicity, religion, region, occupation, gender, sexual preference, etc. These groups live a certain lifestyle based on different values and norms. They are a culture within a culture, hence the label subculture. Weber also purported the idea that people were motivated by their material and ideal interests, which include things such as preventing one from going to hell. Weber also explains that people use symbols to express their spirituality, that symbols are used to express the spiritual side of real events, and that ideal interests are derived from symbols.

==== Georg Simmel ====
For Simmel, culture refers to "the cultivation of individuals through the agency of external forms which have been objectified in the course of history." Simmel presented his analyses within a context of "form" and "content". Sociological concept and analysis can be viewed.

== The elements of a culture ==
As no two cultures are exactly alike they do all have common characteristics.

A culture contains:

1. Social Organization: Structured by organizing its members into smaller numbers to meet the culture's specific requirements. Social classes ranked in order of importance (status) based on the culture's core values. For example: money, job, education, family, etc.

2. Customs and Traditions: Rules of behavior enforced by the cultures ideas of right and wrong such as customs, traditions, rules, or written laws.

3. Symbols: Anything that carries a particular meaning recognized by people who share the same culture.

4. Norms: Rules and expectations by which a society guides the behavior of its members. The two types of norms are mores and folkways. Mores are norms that are widely observed and have a great moral significance. Folkways are norms for routine, casual interaction.

5. Religion: The answers to their basic meanings of life and values.

6. Language: A system of symbols that allows people to communicate with one another.

7. Arts and Literature: Products of human imagination expressed through art, music, literature, stories, and dance.

8. Forms of Government: How the culture distributes power. Who keeps order within the society, who protects them from danger, and who provides for their needs. Can fall into categories such as Democracy, Republic, or Dictatorship.

9. Economic Systems: What to produce, how to produce it, and for whom. How people use their limited resources to satisfy their wants and needs. Can fall into the categories such as Traditional Economy, Market Economy, Command Economy, Mixed Economy.

10. Artifacts: Distinct material objects, such as architecture, technologies, and artistic creations.

11. Social institutions: Patterns of organization and relationships regarding governance, production, socializing, education, knowledge creation, arts, and relating to other cultures.

== Anthropology ==
In an anthropological sense, culture is society based on the values and ideas without influence of the material world.

The cultural system is the cognitive and symbolic matrix for the central values system

— Talcott Parsons

Culture is like the shell of a lobster. Human nature is the organism living inside of that shell. The shell, culture, identifies the organism, or human nature. Culture is what sets human nature apart, and helps direct the life of human nature.

Anthropologists lay claim to the establishment of modern uses of the culture concept as defined by Edward Burnett Tylor in the mid-19th century.

=== Bronisław Malinowski ===
Malinowski collected data from the Trobriand Islands. Descent groups across the island claim parts of the land, and to back up those claims, they tell myths of how an ancestress started a clan and how the clan descends from that ancestress. Malinowski's observations followed the research of that found by Durkheim.

=== Alfred Reginald Radcliffe-Brown ===
Radcliffe-Brown put himself in the culture of the Andaman Islanders. His research showed that group solidification among the islanders is based on music and kinship, and the rituals that involve the use of those activities. In the words of Radcliffe-Brown, "Ritual fortifies Society".

=== Marcel Mauss ===
Marcel Mauss made many comparative studies on religion, magic, law and morality of occidental and non-occidental societies, and developed the concept of total social fact, and argued that the reciprocity is the universal logic of the cultural interaction.

=== Claude Lévi-Strauss ===
Lévi-Strauss, based, at the same time, on the sociological and anthropological positivism of Durkheim, Mauss, Malinowski and Radcliffe-Brown, on the economic and sociological Marxism, on Freudian and Gestalt psychology and on structural linguistics of Saussure and Jakobson, realized great studies on areas myth, kinship, religion, ritual, symbolism, magic, ideology (sauvage pensée), knowledge, art and aesthetics, applying the methodological structuralism on his investigations. He searched the universal principals of human thought as a form of explaining social behaviors and structures.

=== Mary Douglas ===
Mary Douglas is widely known for her contributions to social anthropology, particularly in her analysis of ritual purity, pollution, and the symbolic structures that shape cultural classifications of dirt and disorder. She examined how societies construct and maintain order through these classifications. Her research also focused on the concepts of risk, blame, and misfortune in both traditional and modern contexts, arguing that notions such as witchcraft, sin, and risk serve similar functions in assigning responsibility and preserving social order. Additionally, she developed a theoretical model for understanding how social structures and individual roles influence cultural beliefs and practices.

== Major areas of research ==
=== Theoretical constructs in Bourdieu's sociology of culture ===
French sociologist Pierre Bourdieu's influential model of society and social relations has its roots in Marxist theories of class and conflict. Bourdieu characterizes social relations in the context of what he calls the field, defined as a competitive system of social relations functioning according to its own specific logic or rules. The field is the site of struggle for power between the dominant and subordinate classes. It is within the field that legitimacy—a key aspect defining the dominant class—is conferred or withdrawn.

Bourdieu's theory of practice is practical rather than discursive, embodied as well as cognitive and durable though adaptive. A valid concern that sets the agenda in Bourdieu's theory of practice is how action follows regular statistical patterns without the product of accordance to rules, norms and/or conscious intention. To explain this concern, Bourdieu explains habitus and field. Habitus explains the mutually penetrating realities of individual subjectivity and societal objectivity after the function of social construction. It is employed to transcend the subjective and objective dichotomy.

=== Cultural change ===
The belief that culture is symbolically coded and can thus be taught from one person to another means that cultures, although bounded, can change. Cultures are both predisposed to change and resistant to it. Resistance can come from habit, religion, and the integration and interdependence of cultural traits.

Cultural change can have many causes, including: the environment, inventions, and contact with other cultures.

Several understandings of how cultures change come from anthropology. For instance, in diffusion theory, the form of something moves from one culture to another, but not its meaning. For example, the ankh symbol originated in Egyptian culture but has diffused to numerous cultures. Its original meaning may have been lost, but it is now used by many practitioners of New Age religion as an arcane symbol of power or life forces. A variant of the diffusion theory, stimulus diffusion, refers to an element of one culture leading to an invention in another.

Contact between cultures can also result in acculturation. Acculturation has different meanings, but in this context refers to replacement of the traits of one culture with those of another, such as what happened with many Native American Indians. Related processes on an individual level are assimilation and transculturation, both of which refer to adoption of a different culture by an individual.

Wendy Griswold outlined another sociological approach to cultural change. Griswold points out that it may seem as though culture comes from individuals—which, for certain elements of cultural change, is true—but there is also the larger, collective, and long-lasting culture that cannot have been the creation of single individuals as it predates and post-dates individual humans and contributors to culture. The author presents a sociological perspective to address this conflict.

Sociology suggests an alternative to both the view that it has always been an unsatisfying way at one extreme and the sociological individual genius view at the other. This alternative posits that culture and cultural works are collective, not individual, creations. We can best understand specific cultural objects... by seeing them not as unique to their creators but as the fruits of collective production, fundamentally social in their genesis. (p. 53) In short, Griswold argues that culture changes through the contextually dependent and socially situated actions of individuals; macro-level culture influences the individual who, in turn, can influence that same culture. The logic is a bit circular, but illustrates how culture can change over time yet remain somewhat constant.

It is, of course, important to recognize here that Griswold is talking about cultural change and not the actual origins of culture (as in, "there was no culture and then, suddenly, there was"). Because Griswold does not explicitly distinguish between the origins of cultural change and the origins of culture, it may appear as though Griswold is arguing here for the origins of culture and situating these origins in society. This is neither accurate nor a clear representation of sociological thought on this issue. Culture, just like society, has existed since the beginning of humanity (humans being social and cultural). Society and culture co-exist because humans have social relations and meanings tied to those relations (e.g. brother, lover, friend). Culture as a super-phenomenon has no real beginning except in the sense that humans (homo sapiens) have a beginning. This, then, makes the question of the origins of culture moot—it has existed as long as we have, and will likely exist as long as we do. Cultural change, on the other hand, is a matter that can be questioned and researched, as Griswold does.

=== Culture theory ===
Culture theory, developed in the 1980s and 1990s, sees audiences as playing an active rather than passive role in relation to mass media. One strand of research focuses on the audiences and how they interact with media; the other strand of research focuses on those who produce the media, particularly the news.

=== Culture and cognition ===
A contemporary area of focus in cultural sociology is the interaction between culture and cognition. While the interest between the social and the mental can be traced back to Emile Durkheim's The Elementary Forms of the Religious Life, contemporary sociology of culture and cognition draws heavily from the recent developments in cognitive science. This school of thought argues that sociological research should be grounded in research in cognitive science, and more particularly, sociologists studying culture should incorporate insights from cognitive science to their theoretical and empirical work.

== Current research ==
=== Computer-mediated communication as culture ===
Computer-mediated communication (CMC) is the process of sending messages—primarily, but not limited to text messages—through the direct use by participants of computers and communication networks. By restricting the definition to the direct use of computers in the communication process, you have to get rid of the communication technologies that rely upon computers for switching technology (such as telephony or compressed video), but do not require the users to interact directly with the computer system via a keyboard or similar computer interface. To be mediated by computers in the sense of this project, the communication must be done by participants fully aware of their interaction with the computer technology in the process of creating and delivering messages. Given the current state of computer communications and networks, this limits CMC to primarily text-based messaging, while leaving the possibility of incorporating sound, graphics, and video images as the technology becomes more sophisticated.

=== Cultural institutions ===
Cultural activities are institutionalised; the focus on institutional settings leads to the investigation "of activities in the cultural sector, conceived as historically evolved societal forms of organising the conception, production, distribution, propagation, interpretation, reception, conservation and maintenance of specific cultural goods". Cultural Institutions Studies is therefore a specific approach within the sociology of culture.

== Key figures ==
Key figures in today's cultural sociology include: Julia Adams, Jeffrey Alexander, John Carroll, Diane Crane, Paul DiMaggio, Henning Eichberg, Ron Eyerman, Sarah Gatson, Andreas Glaeser, Wendy Griswold, Eva Illouz, Karin Knorr-Cetina, Michele Lamont, Omar Lizardo, Annette Lareau, Stjepan Mestrovic, Philip Smith, Margaret Somers, Yasemin Soysal, Dan Sperber, Lynette Spillman, Ann Swidler, Stephen Vaisey, Diane Vaughan, and Viviana Zelizer.

== See also ==
- Communication studies
- Cultural anthropology
- Cultural Sociology (journal)
- Cultural studies
- Culture
- Sociology
- Sociology of literature
- Sociomusicology
- Taste (sociology)
