= Elisabeth S. Clemens =

American sociologist

Elisabeth Stephanie Clemens

Academic background
- Education: PhD
- Alma mater: Harvard University (BA 1980) University of Chicago (MA 1985, PhD 1990)
- Thesis: Organizing as Interests: The Transformation of Social Politics in the United States, 1890–1920 (1990)
- Doctoral advisor: Theda Skocpol
- Other advisors: Wendy Griswold, Edward O. Laumann

Academic work
- Discipline: Sociologist
- Institutions: University of Arizona (1990–2002); University of Chicago (2002–present)

Elisabeth Stephanie Clemens is an American sociologist, who is currently the William Rainey Harper Distinguished Service Professor of Sociology and the college at the University of Chicago. Clemens's research is focused on social movements, organizations, and American political development. From 2016 to 2022, Clemens served as editor-in-chief of the American Journal of Sociology.

== Education and career ==
Clemens holds a bachelor's degree in social studies from Harvard University, and in 1990 she graduated from the University of Chicago with a PhD in sociology. At the University of Chicago, Clemens completed her dissertation supervised by Theda Skocpol, Wendy Griswold, and Edward O. Laumann.

From 1990 to 2002, Clemens was a professor at the University of Arizona, before returning to her alma mater the University of Chicago as professor of sociology in 2002. Clemens served as department chair from 2012 to 2015, and from 2012 to 2013 she served as president of the Social Science History Association. In 2016, Clemens assumed the role of editor-in-chief of the American Journal of Sociology, the discipline's first journal in the United States, which she held until 2022.

=== The People's Lobby ===
Clemens's first book The People's Lobby: Organizational Innovation and the Rise of Interest Group Politics in the United States, 1890–1925, which derived from her dissertation research, argues that beginning in the late nineteenth century American politics was transformed from a system oriented around political party organizations and elections to one oriented around interest groups. This shift was instigated by what Clemens refers to as 'the people's lobby', groups of citizens and voters that influenced party politics through novel forms of civic engagement, which bypassed traditional political processes. Clemens investigates the emergence of the people's lobby across the American states California, Washington, and Wisconsin, arguing that federalism allowed for distinct regional variations. The book was awarded the American Sociological Association's Section on Organizations, Occupations, and Work's Max Weber Book award in 1998 as well as the Political Sociology Section's Outstanding Contribution to Political Sociology award in 1999.

Clemens's research developed in The People's Lobby is regarded as engaging with theories of sociological institutions with a focus on organizational innovation. Her scholarship on institutions has been discussed in reviews of sociological literature on social movements and institutionalism.

== Bibliography ==
=== Sole-authored books ===
- Clemens, Elisabeth S. (2020). Civic Gifts: Benevolence and the Making of the American Nation-State. Chicago, IL: University of Chicago Press. ISBN 978-0226670836.
- Clemens, Elisabeth S. (2016). What Is Political Sociology?. Cambridge, UK: Polity Press. ISBN 978-0745691619.
- Clemens, Elisabeth S. (1997). The People's Lobby: Organizational Innovation and the Rise of Interest Group Politics in the United States, 1890-1925. Chicago, IL: University of Chicago Press. ISBN 0226109933.

=== Co-edited books ===
- Clemens, Elisabeth S.; Guthrie, Doug, eds. (2010). Politics and Partnerships: Voluntary Associations in America's Political Past and Present. Chicago, IL: University of Chicago Press. ISBN 978-0226109978.
- Adams, Julia; Clemens, Elisabeth S.; Orloff, Ann Shola, eds. (2005). Remaking Modernity: Politics and Processes in Historical Sociology. Durham, NC: Duke University Press. ISBN 978-0822333630.
- Powell, Walter; Clemens, Elisabeth S., eds. (1998). Private Action and the Public Good. New Haven, CT: Yale University Press. ISBN 978-0300064490.
