= Pigmentocracies =

2014 book by Edward Telles

- Language: English
- Subject: Racial Identity, Latin America, Racial Relations, and Sociology.
- Set in: Peru, Mexico, Brazil, Colombia
- Published: October 2014
- Publisher: University of North Carolina Press Chapel Hill
- Publication place: United States
- ISBN: 978-1-4696-1783-1
- Website: https://perla.princeton.edu/book-launchings/

Pigmentocracies: Ethnicity, Race, and Color in Latin America is a book by sociologist Edward Telles and the Project on Ethnicity and Race in Latin America (PERLA) published by the University of North Carolina Press in 2014. The book attempts to look at race relations within Peru, Colombia, Mexico, and Brazil using statistical methods and comparing national census data over hundreds of years.

== Synopsis ==
The book is split into six chapters. The first discussing the Project on Ethnicity and Race in Latin America (PERLA), then the following four chapters dive into PERLA implemented in the four chosen countries. The final chapter is an analysis of the overall findings of the survey from the four countries. Middle four chapters start with a brief historical context of race in the respective country, then report the findings of the PERLA survey for that country.

== Reception ==
Reviewed by Stanley R. Bailey in The Americas 73 (2016): 102-104.

Reviewed by Ellis P. Monk in the American Journal of Sociology 121 (2015): 971-973.

Reviewed by Cristobal Valencia in American Anthropologist 117 (2015): 599-631.
