= Ann Shola Orloff =

American sociologist

- Born: March 17, 1953 (age 73)
- Notable work: Remaking Modernity: Politics, History and Sociology States, Markets, Families: Gender, Liberalism and Social Policy in Australia, Canada, Great Britain and the United States Many Hands of the State: Theorizing Political Authority and Social Control
- Website: https://sociology.northwestern.edu/people/faculty/core/ann-shola-orloff.html

Ann Shola Orloff (born 1953) is an American sociologist, specializing in Comparative-Historical Sociology, Gender and Social Inequalities, Sociological Theory and Political Sociology. She is a professor of Sociology and Political Science and Board of Lady Managers of the Columbian Exposition Chair at Northwestern University.

== Education and academic career ==
She obtained a B.A. from Harvard University in 1975 and a Ph.D. from Princeton University in 1985. She has been a visiting professor at the European University Institute, Sciences Po in Paris and the Australian National University. She is a professor of Sociology and Political Science and Board of Lady Managers of the Columbian Exposition Chair at Northwestern University. She is also editor of Social Politics, published by Oxford University Press, which she co-founded with Barbara Hobson (Stockholm University) in 1994. Prior to teaching at Northwestern University, she was an assistant professor for Sociology at the University of Wisconsin-Madison. She has received fellowships from the American Council of Learned Societies, the American Association of University Women, and the German Marshall Fund in addition to being a visiting scholar at the Russell Sage Foundation.

== Books ==
Her books include The Many Hands of the State: Theorizing Political Authority and Social Control (co-editor with Kimberly J. Morgan; Cambridge University Press, 2017), Remaking Modernity: Politics, History and Sociology (co-editor with Julia Adams and Elisabeth Clemens; Duke, 2005) and States, Markets, Families: Gender, Liberalism and Social Policy in Australia, Canada, Great Britain and the United States (with Julia O'Connor and Sheila Shaver; Cambridge, 1999).

== Other publications ==
Orloff's publications include Rethinking Power in Politics (2012), Policy, Politics, Gender: Bringing Gender to the Analysis of Welfare States (edited by Stephan Leibfried, Oxford University, 2010), The Power of Gender Perspectives: Feminist Influence on Policy Paradigims, Social Science, and Social Politics (co written by Bruno Pailer, Social Politics, 2009), Gendering the Comparative Analysis of Welfare States: An Unfinished Agenda (Sociological theory, 2009), Solidarity in Question: Gender, Nation and European Social Provision ( Review essay in Social-Economic Review, 2008), From Maternalism to 'Employment for All: State Policies to Promote Women's Employment Across the Affluent Democracies (Co edited by Jonah Levy, Cambridge: Harvard University Press, 2006).

Orloff's publications have shown a repeated pattern of supporting or advocating for social change in regards to woman, gender, and social inequalities. In 2006 Orloff wrote an article called "From Maternalism to 'Employment for all': State Policies to Promote Women's Employment Across the Affluent Democracies," which states that the increase in pay for single mothers does not do anything to change societal pressure. She argues that while the increase in pay helps, there is no benefit to the work-life balance. Some Sociologist disagree with Orloff and argue that the issue with woman working has more effect on depopulation. Orloff, in her 2009 publication, also argues that there needs to be policies in workforces that allow employment and caregiving—at the same time.
