= Lynette Spillman =

American sociologist

Lynette Patrice Spillman
- Education: Australian National University (B.A.); University of California-Berkeley (PhD)
- Known for: cultural sociology, economic sociology, political sociology
- Awards: Vivana Zelizer Award, Clifford Geertz Award
- Scientific career
- Fields: Sociology
- Workplaces: University of Notre Dame
- Academic advisors: Neil Smelser, Ann Swidler

Lynette Patrice Spillman (born 3 July 1957) is a sociologist and professor of sociology at the University of Notre Dame, and a Faculty Fellow of the Helen Kellogg Institute for International Studies, as well as the Center for Cultural Sociology, Yale University. She is particularly known for the application of cultural sociology to the sub-fields of political sociology and economic sociology.

== Career ==
Having completed a BA in sociology and philosophy at the Australian National University in 1982, Lynette Spillman received her MA in 1986 and PhD in 1991 from the University of California-Berkeley, both in sociology. Her doctoral dissertation at Berkeley was titled: Recognition, Integration and the Mobilization of National Identity: Centennials and Bicentennials in the United States and Australia. It later became her first book: Nation and commemoration: creating national identities in the United States and Australia. In 1983 she received a Fulbright award and in 2001 she was a recipient of the John Simon Guggenheim Memorial Foundation Fellowship.

In 2014, Spillman was a keynote speaker at Yale's Center for Cultural Sociology special conference on "Advancing Cultural Sociology".

== Contributions to political sociology ==
Spillman's dissertation and first book published in 1997, Nation and commemoration, "examines meaning-making in politics. It traces the emergence of national identities in two similar “new nations” by comparing ritual and symbol in centennial and bicentennial commemorations." Prominent Berkeley cultural sociologist Ann Swidler describes the work as "pathbreaking" with how it convincingly describes how "two similar nations [Australia and the USA] end up with divergent images of national identity." The work was reviewed in several scholarly journals, including the American Journal of Sociology, Social Forces, International Affairs and the Journal of Intercultural Studies.

== Contributions to economic sociology ==
Spillman's 2012 publication Solidarity in Strategy: Making Business Meaningful in American Trade Associations won both the Mary Douglas Prize for Best Book in Cultural Sociology and the Viviana Zelizer Award for Best Book in Economic Sociology for 2013. The selection committee for the Zelizer Award included Frank Dobbin (chair), Stephanie Mudge and Frederick Wherry. The selection committee for the Douglas Award included Timothy Dowd (chair), Claudio Benzecry, and Simonetta Falasca-Zamponi. Economic sociologist Nina Bandelj states that "This is a path-breaking study of American trade associations that significantly enriches our understanding of contemporary economic life." and Yale sociologist Frederick Wherry argues that "Solidarity in Strategy breaks new ground in the discussion of the cultures of capitalism" Prominent Cornell economic sociologist, Richard Swedberg, considers this work "important because it brings attention to a phenomenon in U.S. life...in a theoretically innovative way that suggests a new - and more sociological - way of looking at the way capitalism operates."

== Personal life ==
Spillman is married to fellow sociologist Russell Faeges.

== Selected bibliography ==
- Solidarity in Strategy: Making Business Meaningful in American Trade Associations. (Chicago and London: University of Chicago Press, 2012)
- Cultural Sociology (Editor) (Malden MA and London: Blackwell, 2002)
- Nation and Commemoration: Creating National Identities in the United States and Australia (Cambridge and New York: Cambridge University Press, 1997).
