= Julia Adams (sociologist) =

American sociologist

- Education: Reed College; University of Wisconsin–Madison
- Occupations: Professor of Sociology and International and Area Studies, Yale University; Head of Grace Hopper College, Yale University

Julia Potter Adams (born July 11, 1957) is an American sociologist who works in the area of comparative and historical sociology. Julia Adams is a professor of Sociology. She conducts research in the areas of state building, gender and family, social theory and knowledge, early modern European politics, and Colonialism and empire. Her current research focuses on the historical sociology of agency relations and modernity, gender, race, and the representation of academic knowledge on Wikipedia and on other digital platforms. Adams is Professor of Sociology and International & Area Studies and Head of Grace Hopper College, Yale. She also co-directs YaleCHESS (Center for Historical Enquiry and the Social Sciences) and is on the Board of Reed College.

== Early life and education ==
Adams attended Reed College. She completed graduate work in sociology, with a minor in history and anthropology, at the University of Wisconsin–Madison.

== Career ==
Adams became an assistant professor at the University of Michigan in 1992. She was later promoted to become an associate professor. She moved to Yale University in 2004.

She was president of the Social Science History Association (SSHA) from 2008 to 2009. Her presidential address covered historical sociological topics including agency, labor, and principal-agent relations. From 2010 to 2013, she served as Joseph C. Fox Fellowship Director at the MacMillan Center for International and Area Studies (Yale).

Adams received a National Science Foundation grant in 2013 to conduct a study of the relationship between gender bias and the portrayal of academics in Wikipedia She collaborated with Hannah Bruckner of New York University-Abu Dhabi. Some of the resulting work has been published in peer-reviewed articles.

In 2005, Adams published two books on historical sociology: The Familial State: Ruling Families and Merchant Capitalism in Early Modern Europe as the sole author, and Remaking Modernity with colleagues Ann Shola Orloff and Elisabeth S. Clemens. The latter book surveys the field of historical sociology and proposes a third wave for historical interpretation and analysis in the social sciences.

In an interview with Marilyn Wilkes for the MacMillan Report at Yale University in 2010, Adams discusses her research regarding high level forms of patriarchal politics and the historical sociology of family relations in early modern states, as well as the contradictions of agency in contemporary America. This research was the background for the development of her book, The Familial State, which focuses on elite families in large scale political development in European countries. She found this research important for both academic reasons, and for the public to have a better understanding of the world around them. Adams often uses the term scholarship in her research. Scholarship, according to Adams, often reflects patriarchal power within twenty-first century inequality and capitalism. By studying Holland's renowned families, who were both state-builders and merchant capitalists during the seventeenth century Dutch Golden Age, Adams discovered how the family patriarchs shaped the first great wave of European colonialism which led to the widespread influence of European political development in the modern world.

Adams has conducted research regarding Wikipedia with Hannah Brückner who is a professor of Social Research and Public Policy at New York University-Abu Dhabi and is a leading sociologist on life course, inequality, health, gender and sexuality. This research project titled, "Wikipedia and the Democratization of Academic Knowledge" is a National Science Foundation (NSF) funded study of how academics and academic subjects are represented on Wikipedia. The research gathered by Adams and Brückner is focused on comparing the structure and statistics of scientific evidence and social scientific evidence with their Wikipedia entries to better understand the development of Wikipedia as a functional and legitimate online encyclopedia.

== Publications ==
=== Books ===
- Adams, J. (2005). The Familial State: Ruling Families and Merchant Capitalism in Early Modern Europe. Cornell University Press, Ithaca, MY.
- Adams, J.; Clemens, E.S.; Orloff, S. (2005). Remaking Modernity: Politics, History, and Sociology. Duke University Press, Durham, NC.
- Charrad, M.M. & Adams, J. (eds.) (2015) Volume 28 - Patrimonial Capitalism and Empire Book Series: Political Power and Social Theory, Emerald Group Publishing. ISBN 978-1-78441-758-1
- Adams, J. & Charrad, M.M. (eds) (2011) Patrimonial Power in the Modern World. The Annals of the American Academy of Political and Social Science. Sage, Thousand Oaks, CA.

=== Articles ===
- Adams, Julia: Brueckner, Hannah and Naslund, Cambria (2019). Who Counts as a Notable Sociologist on Wikipedia? Gender, Race, and the "Professor Test." Socius: Sociological Research for a Dynamic World, Volume 5: pp. 1-14.
- Luo, Wei: Adams, Julia and Brueckner, Hannah (2018). "The Ladies Vanish? American Sociology and the Genealogy of its Missing Women on Wikipedia," Comparative Sociology. Vol. 17 #5, pp. 519–556.
- Adams, Julia and Pincus, Steve (2017). "Imperial States in the Age of Discovery," pp. 333–48 in The Many Hands of the State: Theorizing Political Authority and Social Control (eds. Kimberly J. Morgan and Ann Shola Orloff). New York: Cambridge University Press.
- Adams, Julia and Herzog, Ben (2017). "Women, Gender, and the Revocation of Citizenship in the United States," Sage Journals, August 25, 2017.
- Adams, Julia and Brückner, Hannah (2015). "Wikipedia, sociology, and the promise and pitfalls of Big Data," Big Data and Society, July–December 2015: 1–5.
- Adams, Julia and Shughrue, Chris (2015). "Bottlenecks and East Indies Companies: Modeling the Geography of Agency in Mercantilist Enterprises," in Emily Erikson (ed.) Chartering Capitalism: Organizing Markets, States, and Publics (Political Power and Social Theory, Volume 29) Emerald Group Publishing Limited, pp. 207 – 218.
- Adams, Julia and Steinmetz, George (2015). "Sovereignty and Sociology: From State Theory to Theories of Empire". (Book Series: Political Power and Social Theory). Emerald Publishing.
- Adams, Julia and Wang, Liping Liping, "Interlocking Patrimonialisms and State Formation in Qing China and Early Modern Europe," in J. Adams and M. M. Charrad, Special Editors. (2011) Patrimonial Power in the Modern World, The Annals of the American Academy of Political and Social Science, Vol. 636 (July): Washington, DC: Sage.
- Adams, Julia (2011). "1-800-How-Am-I-Driving? Agency in Social Science History," Social Science History, vol. 35 #1, pp. 1–17
- Adams, Julia and Reed, Ariail Issac (2011). "Culture in the Transitions to Modernity: Seven Pillars of a New Research Agenda," Theory & Society, Volume 40, Issue 3, pp 247–272.
- Adams, Julia and Weakliem, David (2011) "What Do We Mean by "Class Politics"?" Politics & Society Volume 39 Issue 4 December 2011 pp. 475 - 496.
- Adams, Julia (2010). "The Unknown James Coleman: Culture and History in Foundations of Social Theory," pp 237–294 in Contemporary Sociology, Vol 39, #3, 253–8, 2010.
- Adams, Julia (2008). "Scholarly Controversy: The Familial State," pp 237–294 in Political Power and Social Theory, Vol 19, 2008.
- Adams, Julia and Orloff, Ann Ann (2005). "Defending Modernity? High Politics, Feminist Anti-Modernism and the Place of Gender," in Politics and Gender, 1 (1).
- Adams, Julia (2005). "The Rule of the Father: Patriarchy and Patrimonialism in Early Modern Europe," pp. 237–266 in C. Camic, P. S. Gorski and D. M. Trubek (eds.), Max Weber's Economy and Society: A Critical Companion. Stanford, CA: Stanford University Press.
- Adams, Julia and Tasleem, Padamsee (2001). "Signs and Regimes: Rereading Feminist Work on Welfare States," Social Politics, 8 (1): 1-23.
- Adams, Julia (1999). "Culture in Rational-Choice Theories of State Formation," pp. 98–122 in G. Steinmetz (ed.), State/Culture: State Formation After the Cultural Turn. Ithaca, NY: Cornell University Press.
- Adams, Julia (1996). "Principals and Agents, Colonialists and Company Men: The Decay of Colonial Control in the Dutch East Indies," American Sociological Review, 61 (1): 12–28.
- Adams, Julia and McLanahan, Sara (1987) "Parenthood and Psychological Wellbeing," Annual Review of Sociology 13, eds. R. Turner and J. Short. Palo Alto, CA: Annual Reviews: 237–57.
