= Crystal Marie Fleming =

American sociologist and author (born 1981)

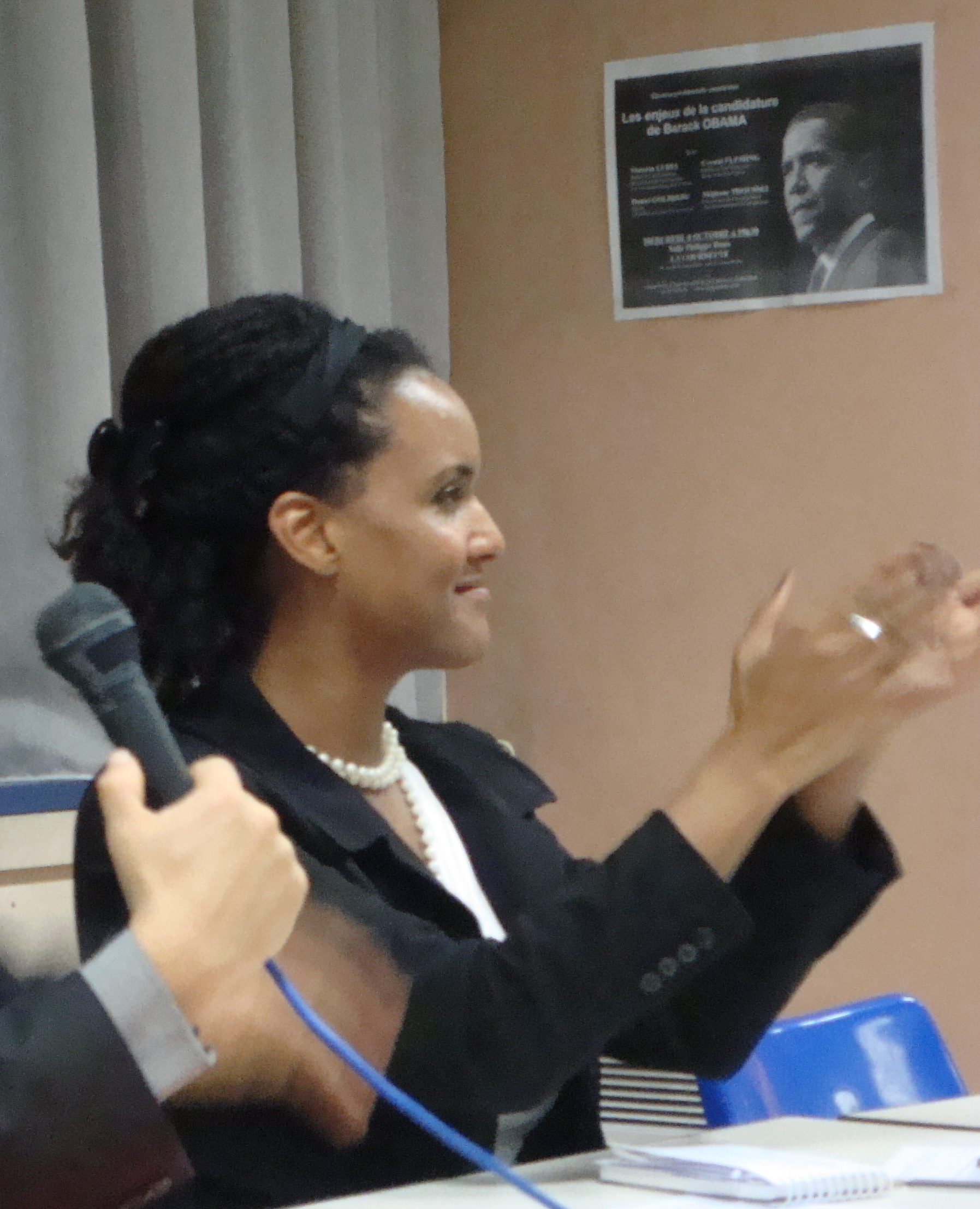
- Crystal Marie Fleming (2008)
- Born: November 26, 1981 (age 44); Chattanooga, Tennessee, U.S.

Academic background
- Education: Wellesley College (B.A.); Harvard University (M.A., Ph.D.)
- Thesis: Imagining French Atlantic Slavery: A Comparison of Mnemonic Entrepreneurs and Everyday Antilleans in Metropolitan France (2011)
- Doctoral advisor: Michèle Lamont

Academic work
- Discipline: Sociology, Africana studies
- Sub-discipline: Racism, white supremacy
- Institutions: Smith College

Crystal Marie Fleming (born November 26, 1981) is an American sociologist and author. She is full professor of sociology and Africana studies at Smith College. Fleming is the author/editor of four books about race and white supremacy.

== Early life and education ==
Crystal Marie Fleming was born in Chattanooga, Tennessee. She was raised by her mother in a religious environment and her family belonged to a black Pentecostal church.

Fleming graduated in 2004, magna cum laude, with a Bachelor of Arts in sociology and French from Wellesley College. She completed a senior thesis titled Performing Blackness: Symbolic Boundaries and Aesthetic Distinctions among Spoken Word Poets in Boston. She obtained a Master of Arts in sociology in 2007 at Harvard University. At the same institution, Fleming earned a Doctor of Philosophy in sociology in 2011. Her dissertation was titled Imagining French Atlantic Slavery: A Comparison of Mnemonic Entrepreneurs and Everyday Antilleans in Metropolitan France. Fleming's doctoral advisor was Michèle Lamont. She won the 2012 Georges Lavau Dissertation Award from the American Political Science Association for an English-language dissertation on French politics.

== Career ==
Fleming is a Professor of Africana Studies at Smith College. She was previously a full professor at Stony Brook University until 2024, and a visiting professor at Charles de Gaulle University – Lille III in 2015. She is the author of two books: Resurrecting Slavery: Racial Legacies and White Supremacy in France and How to Be Less Stupid About Race: On Racism, White Supremacy and the Racial Divide.

== Personal life ==
Fleming is bisexual and queer.

== Selected works ==
- Fleming, Crystal Marie (2017). Resurrecting Slavery: Racial Legacies and White Supremacy in France. Temple University Press. ISBN 9781439914090.
- Fleming, Crystal Marie (2018). How to Be Less Stupid About Race: On Racism, White Supremacy, and the Racial Divide. Beacon Press. ISBN 9780807050781.
- Fleming, Crystal Marie (2021). Rise Up!: How You Can Join the Fight Against White Supremacy. Henry Holt and Company (BYR). ISBN 978-1-250-22638-9.
