= Social Politics =

- Discipline: Political science, sociology, public policy
- Language: English
- Edited by: Barbara Hobson, Ann Shola Orloff, Rianne Mahon

Publication details
- History: 1994–present
- Publisher: Oxford University Press
- Frequency: Quarterly
- Impact factor: 1.808 (2020)

Standard abbreviations
- ISO 4: Soc. Politics

Indexing
- CODEN: SOPOFC
- ISSN: 1072-4745 (print); 1468-2893 (web)
- LCCN: 94644139
- OCLC no.: 28959388

Links
- Journal homepage; Online access; Online archive

Social Politics: International Studies in Gender, State and Society is a peer-reviewed academic journal published by Oxford University Press. It was established in 1994 and is edited by Barbara Hobson, Ann Shola Orloff, and Rianne Mahon. It was previously edited by Fiona Williams.

== Abstracting and indexing ==
Social Politics is abstracted and indexed in:

- CSA Worldwide Political Science Abstracts
- Current Contents/Social and Behavioral Sciences
- Education Research Abstracts
- Family Index Database
- Feminist Periodicals: A Current Listing of Contents
- Historical Abstracts
- International Bibliography of the Social Sciences
- PROQUEST
- Public Affairs Information Services
- Scopus
- Social Sciences Citation Index
- Sociological Abstracts
- Studies on Women and Gender Abstracts

According to the Journal Citation Reports, the journal has a 2020 impact factor of 1.808.

== See also ==
- List of women's studies journals
