= John Levi Martin =

Professor of Sociology

- Education: Wesleyan University (B.A.); University of California, Berkeley (Ph.D.)
- Known for: cultural sociology, cognitive sociology, political sociology, sociological theory
- Awards: ASA Theory Prize for Outstanding Book 2010, 2012
- Scientific career
- Fields: Sociology
- Workplaces: University of Chicago
- Doctoral advisor: Ann Swidler
- Other academic advisors: Michael Hout

John Levi Martin is an American sociologist and the Florence Borchert Bartling Professor of Sociology at the University of Chicago. He is the author of five books: Thinking Through Statistics, Thinking Through Methods, Thinking Through Theory, Social Structures, The Explanation of Social Action, the latter two of which have both won the Theory Prize for Outstanding Book from the ASA's Theory Section. He has also written data analysis programs such as DAMN (Dyadic Analysis of Multiple Networks) and ELLA (Every-gal-and-guy's Latent Lattice Analyser).

== Early life and education ==
Martin studied at Wesleyan University and received a BA in sociology and English in 1987. While there he was influenced by notable political sociologist Herbert Hyman who died in 1985, and Martin received the Herbert Hyman prize for undergraduate sociology for his thesis: The Epistemology of Fundamentalism. He then attended the University of California - Berkeley, where he received a MA in 1990 and a PhD in 1997. His dissertation committee was Ann Swidler (chair), Mike Hout, James Wiley, John Wilmoth. It was titled Power Structure and Belief Structure in Forty American Communes, and used the Urban Commune Data Set.

== Selected works ==
- 1998: "Structures of Power in Naturally Occurring Communities". - Social Networks. - 20. - pp. 197–225.
- 1999: "Entropic Measures of Belief System Constraint". - Social Science Research. - 28. - pp. 111–134.
- 1999: (with James Wiley) - "Algebraic Representations of Beliefs and Attitudes: Partial Order Models for Item Responses". - Sociological Methodology. 29. - pp. 113–146.
- 1999: "A General Permutation-Based QAP Analysis for Dyadic Data from Multiple Groups". - Connections. - 22. - pp. 50–60.
- 2002: "Some Algebraic Structures for Diffusion in Social Networks". - Journal of Mathematical Sociology. 26. - pp. 123–146.
- 2003: "What is Field Theory?". - American Journal of Sociology. 109. - pp. 1–49.
- 2009: Social Structures. - Princeton University Press.
- 2011: The Explanation of Social Action. - Oxford University Press.
- 2018: Thinking Through Statistics. - University of Chicago Press.
- 2024: The True, the Good, and the Beautiful: The Rise and Fall and Rise of an Architectonic for Action. - Columbia University Press.
