= Mary Bowman =

American economist (1908–2002)

Mary Jean Bowman
- Mary Jean Bowman working at her desk
- Born: October 17, 1908; New York City, New York, United States
- Died: June 4, 2002 (aged 93); Hyde Park, Illinois, United States
- Spouse: C. Arnold Anderson (m. 1942)

Academic background
- Education: Vassar College; Radcliffe College (M.A.); Harvard University (Ph.D.)

Academic work
- Discipline: Education economics
- Institutions: Iowa State University; University of Chicago

Mary Jean Bowman (October 17, 1908 – June 4, 2002) was an American economist who mostly focused on education economics.

== Personal life and education ==
Mary Jean Bowman was born to mother Mary K. Kauffman and father Harold Martin Bowman on October 17, 1908, in New York City. She was raised in Newton Centre, Massachusetts. She graduated Phi Beta Kappa from Vassar College in 1930. She received her Master of Arts degree from Radcliffe College two years later and her Ph.D. from Harvard University in 1938. She relocated to Chicago, Illinois with her husband, C. Arnold Anderson, in 1949. The two were married on July 18, 1942, in Iowa City, Iowa. Together they had one child, Lloyd Barr. Dr. Bowman died at home in Hyde Park on June 4, 2002.

== Career ==
In the 1930s, Dr. Bowman was doing research and casework at the Massachusetts Women's State Prison. Bowman's first job after college was in 1932 when she became city supervisor of the United States Bureau of Labor Statistics. Three years later she became an instructor and, later, an assistant professor at Iowa State University where she remained until 1943. During her time teaching at Iowa State she, and the other school's scientists were asked, under pressure from the dairy industry to support the idea that, "butter is better for you than margarine." In what became known as the oleomargarine diaspora, she, her husband, Theodore Schultz, D. Gale Johnson, and others left the university as a form of protest. She served as Director of the Northwest Central Region Consumer Purchases Survey for the United States Department of Agriculture during academic year 1935–36 and was a visiting professor at the University of Minnesota in 1941. She was a senior economist at the Bureau of Labor Statistics in 1944–46. Bowman was a Fulbright research fellow in Sweden in 1956–57 and then was a contract researcher for Resources for the Future until 1959. Due to her husband being a faculty member at the University of Chicago, Bowman served as an associate professor at the University of Chicago until she received a faculty appointment in 1958 as a result of a change in nepotism rules at the university. In 1969 she received joint-appointment in the economics and education departments at the university.

She served as a visiting professor in Yugoslavia, Brazil, Sweden, the London School of Economics and with the World Bank.

Mary Jean Bowman was the only female member of the social science research council, and she served at the national level for the American Association of University Women in 1953.

Using data from the United States, Mexico, Japan and Malaysia, Bowman investigated the effects of education on economic development and income distribution, with an emphasis on the relationship between fertility and technological change. Some of her later work explores expectations and business decision-making, especially investment decisions.

== Published work ==
Mary Jean Bowman wrote six books and over seventy-five articles. She was known for her work in the economics of education. In the 1940s and 1950s, the textbook that she co-authored with George Leland Bach, called Economic Analysis and Public Policy, became the most popularly used college-level economic textbook. She researched and published articles on domestic and international economic issues, and worked with her husband to publish work as well.
