= Cultural turn =

1970s movement in the humanities and social sciences

The cultural turn is a movement beginning in the early 1970s among scholars in the humanities and social sciences to make culture the focus of contemporary debates; it also describes a shift in emphasis toward meaning and away from a positivist epistemology and quantitative research. The cultural turn is described in 2005 by Lynette Spillman and Mark D. Jacobs as "one of the most influential trends in the humanities and social sciences in the last generation." A prominent historiographer argues that the cultural turn involved a "wide array of new theoretical impulses coming from fields formerly peripheral to the social sciences," especially post-structuralism, cultural studies, literary criticism, and various forms of linguistic analysis, which emphasized "the causal and socially constitutive role of cultural processes and systems of signification."

== Background ==
The cultural turn in the late 20th century is interpreted as referring to either a substantive shift in society or an analytical shift in academia. The former argues that culture plays a more significant role in advanced societies, which fits with the notion of post-modernity as a historical era in which people "emphasizes the importance of art and culture for education, moral growth, and social criticism and change". The latter is movement within academia to place the concept of culture, and the related notions of meaning, cognition, affect, and symbols at the center of methodological and theoretical focus. Some argue that the analytical shift is endogenous to the substantive shift.

Culture can be defined as "the social process whereby people communicate meanings, make sense of their world, construct their identities, and define their beliefs and values". Or, for Georg Simmel, culture refers to "the cultivation of individuals through the agency of external forms which have been objectified in the course of history". Thus culture can be interpreted on a spectrum from purely individualistic solipsism to objective forms of social organization and interaction.

== History ==
=== Analytical shift ===
One of the earliest works in which the term "cultural turn" showed up was Jeffrey C. Alexander's chapter "The New Theoretical Movement" in Neil Smelser's Handbook of Sociology (1988). According to Alexander, the origins of the cultural turn should be traced to the nineteenth-century debate between idealism and materialism, i.e. Hegel and Marx, respectively. Prior to the labeling of the movement, in the 1970s, "foundational works underlying and facilitating the turn to cultural forms of analysis" emerged: Hayden White's Metahistory: The Historical Imagination in Nineteenth-Century Europe (1973), Clifford Geertz's The Interpretation of Cultures: Selected Essays (1973), Michel Foucault's Discipline and Punish (1977), and Pierre Bourdieu's Outline of a Theory of Practice (1977).

While the earlier twentieth century experienced a linguistic turn, mostly brought about by the thought of Ludwig Wittgenstein and Ferdinand de Saussure, the cultural turn of the late twentieth century absorbed those criticisms and built on them.

The cultural turn has helped cultural studies to gain more respect as an academic discipline. With the shift away from high arts the discipline has increased its perceived importance and influence on other disciplines.

British historian Heather Jones argues that the historiography of the First World War has been reinvigorated by the cultural turn in recent years. Scholars have raised entirely new questions regarding military occupation, radicalisation of politics, race, and the male body.

=== Substantive shift ===
The cultural turn as an historical era that breaks substantively with the past is only tangentially related to cultural turn as analytical shift. Proponents of the former argue that:

“The very sphere of culture itself has expanded, becoming coterminous with market society in such a way that the cultural is no longer limited to its earlier, traditional or experimental forms, but it is consumed throughout daily life itself, in shopping, in professional activities, in the various often televisual forms of leisure, in production for the market and in the consumption of those market products, indeed in the most secret folds and corners of the quotidian. Social space is now completely saturated with the image of culture.”

— Fredric Jameson, 1998, p. 111

Advertising, amateur photography, yellow journalism and an assortment of other forms of media arose after the politically charged 1960s. Moreover, this media was multicultural, and attempted to target all races, ethnicities and age groups, as opposed to more exclusive media prior to the 1960s. This "new media" of a postmodern America brought about an expansion and differentiation of culture, which has only been rapidly expanded by the Internet and social media.

== In rural studies ==
In recent years, there has been something of a resurgence in rural studies, which has become somewhat more mainstream than previously in the academic space of social science. Increasing numbers of people have taken on important dualistic questions of society/space, nature/culture structure/agency and self/other from the perspective of rural studies. However, it is the 'cultural turn' in wider social science which has lent both respectability and excitement to the nexus with rurality, particularly with new foci on landscape, otherness and the spatiality of nature. With a conceptual fascination with difference, and a methodological fascination with ethnography, cultural studies have provided a significant palimpsestuous overlay onto existing landscapes of knowledge.

== See also ==
- Aretaic turn
- Culturalism
- Historical turn
- Linguistic turn
- Quantitative revolution
