= Doug Guthrie =

American sociologist

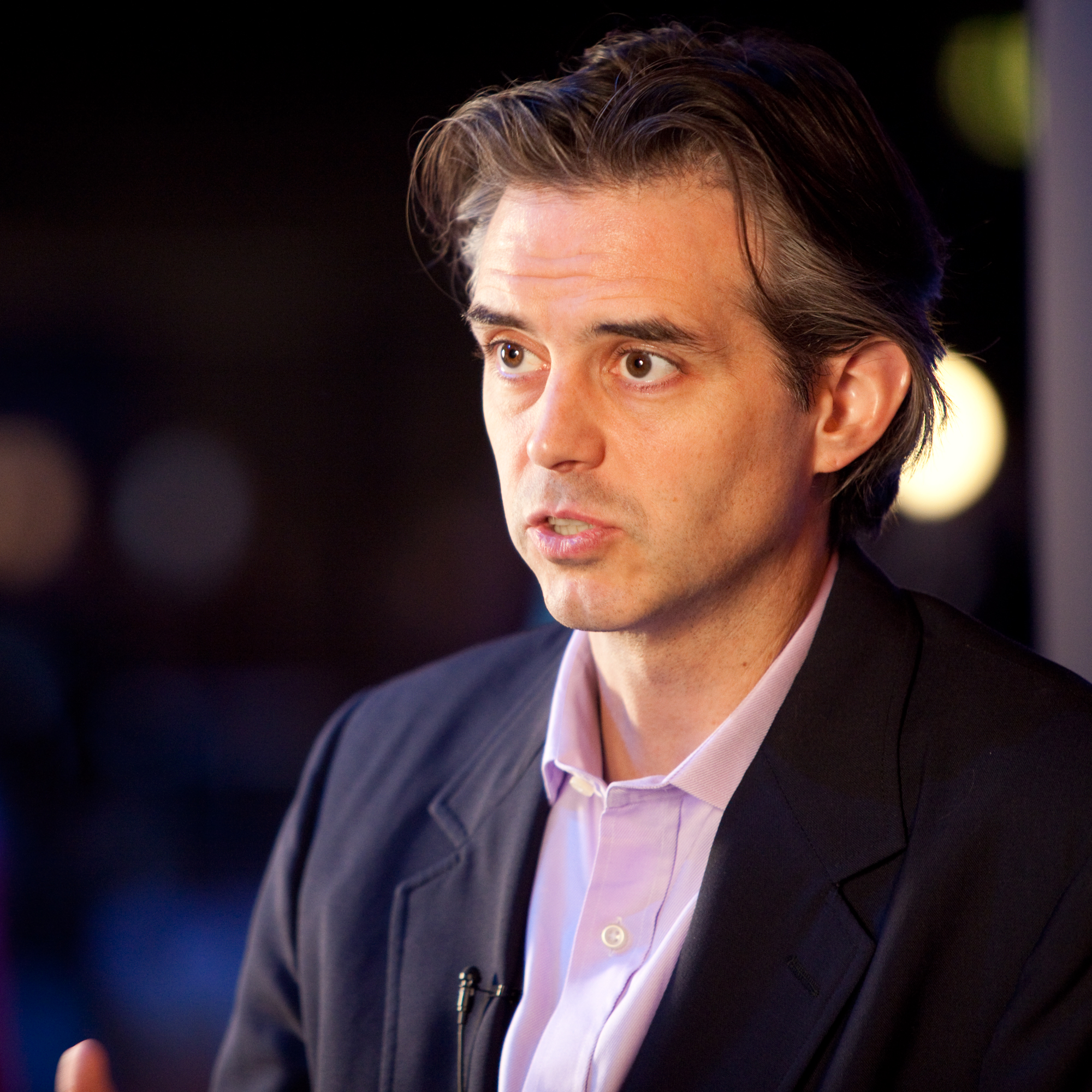
- Education: University of Chicago (BA), University of California, Berkeley (PhD)
- Awards: American Sociological Association's Best Dissertation in the Discipline (1997)
- Scientific career
- Fields: Sociology
- Workplaces: Thunderbird School of Global Management; Apple Inc.; The George Washington University; Harvard Business School; New York University Stern School of Business; INSEAD; Stanford University School of Business; Columbia Business School; Emory University Business School
- Doctoral advisor: Neil Fligstein, Thomas Gold

Doug Guthrie is an American academic administrator, sociologist, and China scholar. He is currently Professor of Global Leadership and Executive Director of China Initiatives at the Thunderbird School of Global Management at Arizona State University. He was previously Faculty Member of Apple University in China at Apple, Dean of The George Washington University School of Business, and Professor of Management and Sociology and Director of Executive Education and NYU's Stern School of Business. He has also worked as a visiting Professor of Management at the business schools of Columbia, Stanford, Harvard, Emory, and INSEAD and as director of the Business Institutions Initiative at the Social Science Research Council.

== Biography ==
Guthrie earned a PhD from the University of California, Berkeley, and he was awarded an American Sociological Association award for best dissertation in 1997.

Guthrie's academic career began in 1997, as a professor of sociology at New York University. After receiving tenure in 2000, Guthrie spent time at a variety of business schools including Columbia, Harvard, Stanford, Emory, and INSEAD. Upon returning to NYU in 2005, Guthrie took up an appointment as Professor of Management and Director of Custom Executive Education at NYU's Stern School of Business. In the Summer of 2010, he was named Dean of the George Washington University School of Business. He stepped down from the Deanship and his university position as vice president for China operations in August 2013. The university cited "fundamental differences about financial and operational performance" as a reason for his departure, namely, the School of Business' overspending by $13 million in the preceding year under his leadership.

In 2014, Apple hired Guthrie to lead Apple University's leadership development work in China and advise on the company's operations in China. He left the company in 2019.

== Books ==
- Politics and Partnerships: The Transformation of the Nonprofit Sector in the Era of the Declining Welfare State. Co-edited with Elisabeth S. Clemens (Chicago: University of Chicago Press, 2010).
- China and Globalization: The Social, Economic, and Political Transformation of Chinese Society, 3rd ed. (New York: Routledge, 2012).
- China and Globalization: The Social, Economic, and Political Transformation of Chinese Society, 2nd ed. (New York: Routledge, 2008).
- China and Globalization: The Social, Economic, and Political Transformation of Chinese Society, 1st ed. (New York: Routledge, 2004).
- Social Connections in China: Institutions, Culture, and the Changing Nature of Guanxi. Co-edited with Thomas Gold and David Wank (New York: Cambridge University Press, 2001).
- Dragon in a Three-Piece Suit: The Emergence of Capitalism in China. (Princeton, NJ: Princeton University Press, 1999).

== Articles (selected) ==
- “China’s Political Regime and Economic System: Corporate Governance in Today’s China.” Handbook on Corporate Governance in China, edited by Martin Conyon and Lerong He. (With Dashiell Chien, Chris Gao, and Diane Long, 2025)
- “Economic Openness and Institutional Embeddedness: Global Capital and Firm Performance in China’s Stock Market.” Social Science Quarterly. Vol. 99 (2): 807-828. (With Junmin Wang and Yanlong Zhang, 2018)
- “Stability, Asset Management, and Gradual Change in China’s Reform Economy.” In China’s State Capitalism: State Capitalism, Institutional Adaptation, and the Chinese Miracle, edited by Barry Naughton and Kellee Tsai, pp. 75–101. New York: Cambridge University Press. (With Zhixing Xiao and Junmin Wang, 2015)
- “The Rise and Effects of State-Owned Asset Management Companies in China.” Chinese Management Insights (17). (With Zhixing Xiao and Junmin Wang, 2014)
- “China and Individualism.” Routledge Handbook of China’s Governance and Domestic Politics. (2013)
- “Messy Details: Ownership Networks and New Institutional Forms in Transitions from Plan to Market.” In The Small Worlds of Corporate Governance, edited by Bruce Kogut. Cambridge, MA: MIT Press. (With Ilya Okmatovskiy, Roger Schoeman and Zhixing Xiao, 2012)
- “The Rise of SASAC: Asset Management, Ownership Concentration, and Firm Performance in China’s Capital Markets.” Management and Organization Review. (Junmin Wang and Zhixing Xiao, 2012)
- Guthrie, Doug. “Innovation in the Chinese Mode.” Science vol. 333 (July 22, 2011). (2011)
- Marquis, Christopher, Doug Guthrie, and John Almandoz. “Corporate Responsibility, State Activism and the Hidden Incentives behind Bank Mergers, 1990-2000: Tax Credits, the Community Reinvestment Act, and Economic Change.” Social Science Research 41: 130-45. (With Christopher Marquis and John Almandoz, 2011)
- “Communities, Labor, and the Law: The Rise of Corporate Social Responsibility in the United States.” Research in the Sociology of Organizations 33:143-73. (With Justin Miller, 2011)
- Clemens, Elisabeth and Doug Guthrie. “Politics and Partnerships: The Role of Voluntary Associations in America’s Political Past and Present.” In Politics and Partnerships: The Transformation of the Nonprofit Sector in the Era of the Declining Welfare State. Chicago: University of Chicago Press. (With Elisabeth Clemens, 2010)
- “Corporate Philanthropy in the United States: Where do Corporations Place their Bets?” In Politics and Partnerships: The Transformation of the Nonprofit Sector in the Era of the Declining Welfare State. Chicago: University of Chicago Press. (2010)
- “Inefficient Deregulation and the Global Economic Crisis: The United States and China Compared.” (Special Edition: Markets on Trial: The Economic Sociology of the US Financial Crisis, Edited by Michael Loundsbury and Paul M. Hirsch.) Research in the Sociology of Organizations 30B: 283–312. (With David Slocum, 2010)
- “Work and Productivity in Reform-Era China.” Research in the Sociology of Work 19: 35–73. (With Zhixing Xiao, and Junmin Wang, 2009)
- “Social Enterprise and Social Entrepreneurship: Institutional Innovation and Social Change.” European Management Review: 1–13. (With Rodolphe Durand 2008)
- “Corporate Investment, Social Innovation, and Community Change: The Local Political Economy of Low-Income Housing Development.” City and Community 7(2): 113–40. (With Michael McQuarrie, 2008)
- “Giving to Local Schools: Corporate Philanthropy and the Receding Welfare State.” Social Science Research 974: 1–18. (With Richard Arum, Josipa Roksa, and Sarah Damaske, 2007)
- “Privatization and the Social Contract: Corporate Welfare and Low-Income Housing in the United States since 1986.” Research in Political Sociology 14: 15–51. (With Michael McQuarrie, 2005)
- “Organizational Learning and Productivity: State Structure and Foreign Investment in the Rise of the Chinese Corporation.” Management and Organization Review 1(2): 165–95. (2005)
- “An Accidental Good: How Savvy Social Entrepreneurs Seized on a Tax Loophole to Raise Billions of Corporate Dollars for Affordable Housing.” Stanford Social Innovation Review (Fall): 34–44. (2004)
- “The Quiet Revolution: The Emergence of Capitalism in China,” Harvard International Review 25(2): 48–53. (2003)
- “The Transformation of Labor Relations in China’s Emerging Market Economy.” Research in Social Stratification and Mobility 19: 137–68. (2002)
- “Understanding China’s Transition to Capitalism: The Contributions of Victor Nee and Andrew Walder.” Sociological Forum 15(4): 725–47. (2000)
- “The State, Courts, and Equal Opportunities for Female CEOs in U.S. Organizations: Specifying Institutional Mechanisms.” Social Forces 78(2): 511–42. (With Louise Roth 1999)
- “The State, Courts, and Maternity Leave Policies in U.S. Organizations: Specifying Institutional Mechanisms.” American Sociological Review 64(1): 41–63. (With Louise Roth 1999)
- “The Declining Significance of Guanxi in China’s Economic Transition.” The China Quarterly 154: 31–62. (1998)
- “Between Markets and Politics: Organizational Responses to Reform in China.” American Journal of Sociology 102: 1258–1303. (1997)
