= C. Arnold Anderson =

American sociologist and economist (born 1907)

Charles Arnold Anderson
- Born: January 13, 1907; Platte, South Dakota, US
- Died: June 26, 1990 (aged 83); Chicago, Illinois, US
- Other name: C. Arnold Anderson
- Education: University of Minnesota
- Spouse: Mary Bowman
- Children: Lloyd Barr
- Scientific career
- Fields: Comparative Education and Rural Sociology

Charles Arnold Anderson (January 13, 1907 – June 26, 1990) was an American educator and scholar, known for his significant contributions to the fields of comparative education and rural sociology. He published under the name C. Arnold Anderson in academic journals.

== Personal life and education ==
He was born in Platte, South Dakota, to Edward Thomas and Edith (Orvis). He grew up in a rural community which would have some influence on his research. Anderson obtained a Bachelor of Arts (B.A.) in 1927, a Master of Arts (M.A.) in 1928, and a Doctor of Philosophy (Ph.D.) in sociology in 1932, all from the University of Minnesota. Anderson married Mary Bowman on July 18, 1942. Anderson and his wife would collaborate on several research projects together and worked together at the University of Chicago.

== Career timeline ==
- 1929 - Instructor at University of Minnesota
- 1930 to 1935 - Harvard University
- 1936 to 1943 - Iowa State University
- 1943 - Harvard University
- 1944 to 1945 - Numerous U.S. government assignments
- 1945 to 1948 - University of Kentucky
- 1948 to 1949 - Faculty member at University of California, Berkeley
- 1954 to 1955 - Visiting professor at the University of Lund in Sweden
- 1956 - Fulbright scholar at Uppsala
- 1958 to 1972 - Professor at the University of Chicago and inaugural director of the university's Comparative Education Center
- 1967 to 1973 - Chief editor of the American Journal of Sociology
- 1974 - Visiting professor at the Stockholm University
- 1975 - Visiting professor at the University of London

== Contributions ==
Anderson made significant contributions to the field of education, publishing over 200 works in journals spanning sociology, education, political science, social mobility, and economics. Anderson helped start the Comparative Education Center at the University of Chicago between 1958 and 1972. He co-edited Education, Economy, and Sociology in 1961 and Education and Economic Growth in 1965. Additionally, he played a key role as the chief editor of the American Journal of Sociology from 1967 to 1973. Anderson was also a consultant for UNESCO and the Ford Foundation.

== Research ==
Anderson's background of growing up in a rural area had a significant impact on him and his research interests, according to the conversations between him and Phillip Foster who worked with him at the University of Chicago. Anderson showed sympathy towards the rural community and through his research he worked on things like policy change, in economics and education in underdeveloped areas. Anderson's mentor at the University of Minnesota was Pitirim Alexandrovitch Sorokin, who shared a similar interest in rural life due to his upbringing and influenced Anderson's later work. While Anderson was at the University of Chicago, he worked on researching comparative education and helped with the creation of the Comparative Education Center at the university. Foster would say Anderson focused on the "demographics of education," which looks at patterns in educational development.
