= Robert D. Mare =

American sociologist (1951–2021)

Robert Denis Mare
- Born: July 16, 1951; North Vancouver, Canada
- Died: February 1, 2021 (aged 69); Marina Del Rey, California, US
- Education: Undergraduate Degree, Reed College, 1973 Ph. D. in Sociology, University of Michigan in 1977
- Occupations: Sociologist, Demographer, Professor, Director, President
- Years active: 1977-2015
- Employer(s): University of California Los Angeles, University of Wisconsin
- Organization(s): Research Committee on Social Stratification and Mobility, American Academy of Arts and Sciences, National Academy of Sciences, American Sociological Association, California Center for Population Research, Population Association of America
- Spouse: Judith Seltzer
- Awards: Robert M. Hauser Award from the Inequality, Poverty and Mobility

Robert Denis Mare (1951 – February 1, 2021) was an American sociologist and demographer best known for research on social stratification. He received numerous awards and had his research covered in the popular press. Mare served as the President of the Population Association of America (PAA) in 2010 and was a fellow of the American Academy of Arts and Sciences and the National Academy of Sciences. At the time of his death, he had retired from his position as a Distinguished Professor of Sociology at the University of California, Los Angeles.

== Early life and education ==
Robert Mare was born in North Vancouver, Canada, in 1951, to Arthur and Helen Mare. He completed his undergraduate degree at Reed College in 1973 and obtained a Ph.D. in sociology at the University Michigan, where he was also a trainee at the Population Studies Center in 1977.

Mare collaborated with Christopher Winship from the 1980s through the early 1990s, where they produced articles revolving around the topics of statistical modeling, education attainment and unemployment.

=== Youth unemployment and school-to-work transition ===
Mare worked with Winship on issues related to youth unemployment and the transition from school to workplace. Their work revealed the importance of selection bias and population compositional changes in understanding employment trends. Mare argued that changes in employment rates among youth were not just due to individual action but also due to compositional changes in the labor force. They also applied this framework to explain the rise of black youth in the 1970s and 1980s, attributing it to increased school enrollment and military enlistment among black youth. Their works focused on how changes in school enrollment or military enlistment affected employment rates across different demographic groups, pinpointing to the interplay between individual actions and macro-level societal trends.

=== Selection bias and statistical methods ===
Mare's early academic studies were influenced by quantitative social science research methodology. Mare's interest in selection bias was evident in his early work on educational attainment, where he found that how differential attrition like dropping out of school could alter the relationship between social background and educational outcomes. He underscored the importance of addressing selection bias in social research. In his 1992 paper on Annual Review of Sociology, he proposed a combination of approaches-ranging from Heckman's estimator to semi-parametric methods and Manski's bounds to ensure the robustness in social research.

== Career ==
Mare started his career as a faculty member at the University of Wisconsin, where he was well known for mentorship, from 1977 to 1997, moving up through the ranks from assistant to full professor. Mare was a fellow of Stanford University's Center for Advanced Study in the Behavioral Sciences from 1983 to 1984, and a visiting senior social scientist at the RAND Corporation from 1994 to 1995. He directed the University of Wisconsin's Center for Demography and Ecology from 1989 to 1994. In 1997, Mare moved to the University of California, Los Angeles, where he also held an appointment in statistics. He was a founding member of the California Center for Population Research in 1998 and became a distinguished professor in 2007.

Mare's research examined social trends in education, work, marriage, and residential and social mobility. He studied the reproduction of social inequality across generations and the self-perpetuation of social hierarchies. Mare found, for example, an increase between 1960 and 2010 in the proportion of American couples in which both members have a college degree, demonstrating that such a pattern can also increase inequality in the resources available to children, with implications for children's own achievement. His research on marriage received coverage in such media outlets as The Atlantic and The New York Times. Mare is perhaps best known for the "Mare Model," according to which a person's educational trajectory is understood as the product of a sequence of decisions made at successive stages.

Mare expanded on a cumulative model that operationalized educational attainment and implemented unemployment as a critical contingency, brought family formation and demographic processes into the study of mobility, and advanced sociology research beyond the scope of kinship influence of parents to multiple generations. Mare's major works concentrated on sociology research in the scopes of educational stratification, assortative mating, residential mobility, and demographic modeling.

== Mare Model of educational attainment ==
=== Historical context ===
The foundation of the Mare Model arose from Mare's 1977 Dissertation that studied educational attainment through grade progression of white males from 1907 to 1957. A large aspect of his study depended on the historical context of how education had changed from 1907 to 1957 among his later cohorts, especially (minority) students and military veterans.

By 1918, all the U.S. states had enacted legislation that required all children to obtain mandatory education until a certain age, which began the era of universal education within the United States. However, these regulations were not sufficiently enforced by the states until at least 1930. Another pivotal turning point in education growth in the United States occurred after World War II, when Congress passed the GI Bill of 1944 (Servicemen's Readjustment Act of 1944) that aided in the establishment of numerous programs in support of war veterans to re-accustom them to their lives back home. This legislation was significant in enabling the thousands of veterans to pursue undergraduate or graduate education in many universities throughout the country. With the end of World War II, the United States became involved in a battle of ideology with the Soviet Union in the Cold War. The United States and the Soviet Union were in a conflict to spread their ideology through propaganda, military prowess, and financial support to new, decolonized nations. A roadblock to U.S. plans was the fear of new colonies moving into the Soviet Orbit due to these colonies viewing the United States as a nation of oppression of African Americans and other minority groups. This led to the Civil Rights Movement and the Brown v Board of Education court case in 1954, because it expanded access to education and other opportunities for African Americans and minorities. Another vital impact of the Cold War was an increased emphasis on education to cultivate new talent in the United States. In particular, after the launch of the Soviet Union's Sputnik program, U.S. fears about Soviet influence drastically increased, which resulted in much greater effort on Research and Development. This caused the Research and Development budgets of the United States to grow from 17.4 billion dollars to 44.1 billion dollars after the launch of Sputnik. Some of these funds were used for education research in order to understand education attainment and how it is affected by socioeconomic factors to fight against poverty and continue innovating. These major events influenced a large aspect of the education research area from the mid-20th century and the foundation of the Mare Model.

=== Previous research in educational attainment ===
Prior to the Mare Model, Blau-Duncan's Basic Model of Social Attainment used quantitative methods to study education and how it is influenced through the role of family, especially a father's social status. In particular, this early model showed a positive relationship between the father's education and job status with the child's own education and first job. Therefore, this model was vital in determining the impact of family on education and career prospects. This research was a major foundation of the Mare model. When Mare started his research, many sociologists were investigating unemployment in the population, especially among 16-18 year olds and among the African American population, due to significant government grants. However, there was a shift in focus to the transition between education and work and military and civil life. This led to many researchers emphasizing how the overall schooling of an individual impacts their professions and other characteristics. For example, these researchers emphasized how obtaining a Ph.D. would impact their ability to obtain a job compared with someone with a master's or bachelor's degree. This led to many researchers starting to use statistical and computer models to represent the impact and cause of educational attainment with various factors, from social standing to parental support, and employment prospects.

=== Principles of the Mare Model ===
The foundation of the Mare model emphasized the role of progression from one education level to another, and how progression is impacted by a number of social factors. In particular, the Mare Model emphasized how transitions from one to another, such as from 8th grade to 9th grade or 12th grade to college, not only impact each successive grade but are impacted by many other social factors, like socioeconomic status, family support, and a military background. This model uncovered information about education by discovering social factors about schooling and their impact on progression through the educational system.

=== Impact and results of the Mare Model ===
In the Mare's 1977 dissertation, a contribution afforded by Mare to the social stratification community was the use of new and advanced statistical methods to study education attainment that has become a classic model for occupational and education studies in many regions of the world. A model pioneered by Mare has enabled more precise comparison between three main categories: cross-cohort comparison at the same transition points, cross-national comparison at the same transition point, and cohort comparison across different transition points. Therefore, Mare's model allowed for comparison of how education attainment could vary across the nation and among different categories based on social factors and their specific transition point of education. This allowed for the researchers to answer a wide range of questions regarding how the impact of various transition points from nursery school to graduate school could impact or be impacted by a range of factors, from a father's occupation to the level of funding for a school. In addition, it allowed for the study of how cities and nations vary in terms of educational attainment and possible reasons that some education systems are better equipped for student progression.

Mare's work in educational attainment not only provided tools and techniques for the future to expand upon the field of educational attainment but also drew conclusions about social factors in various stages of education. One aspect of education attainment that Mare focused on was the effect of family background and socioeconomic status within a family. An insightful conclusion he drew was about students that leave their academics at specific stages, which he attributes is not as significantly related to family background as one may assume. In particular, his research uncovered that a family with higher-valued forms of occupation, income, and the final education level of the parents tended to increase the chance of a child ending their education at an earlier stage. He attributed this phenomenon to the idea that students that come from higher economic status or families of more wealth do not have an obligation to study beyond what is necessary for them to participate in their jobs or desired positions. Interestingly, one result of Mare's research was the impact of a parent socioeconomic effect over schooling through grade progression. In particular, his model demonstrated that a family's economic status' effect on education tended to decline over the schooling period eventually culminating in the transition between college and graduate school having no effect or even a negative effect. Additionally, he also correlated that educational attrition can decrease in students from southern states, broken families, and farm backgrounds, which are historically thought to be lower socioeconomic status groups. This result elucidated how socioeconomic factors in the U.S. had a less significant effect on education level as higher education levels were obtained. Therefore, these conclusions demonstrate the socioeconomic status is vital up to a degree of education, after which it has a negative effect on education. This can be linked back to social mobility and how those already in positions of power can use their influence and sufficient education to obtain necessary jobs for their social status. However, those of lower socioeconomic status from the south, farming backgrounds, and broken homes depend on more significant schooling to raise their socioeconomic status, which is why those of lower economic status tend to result in less economical means being necessary to attend higher levels of learning due to them needing more education to achieve better positions.

Another vital effect of the Mare Model is the quality of education and how that impacts a student's desire to continue to the next stage of education development. These factors are what Mare attributes to market and institutional factors of educational attainment. In particular, Mare Model's comparison of various cohorts allowed him to uncover that increasing school expenditure and teacher salaries have had a positive effect on improving student outcomes in moving to the next grade level, which eventually declines with later schooling. Therefore, this conclusion enables us to understand that students who are provided better resources and more compensated teachers allow for the students to move to the next stage of education instead of discontinuing their education early in their academic career, which can result from increased student interest in the classroom. In addition, another key economic effect noted by Mare is the transition between high school and college, in which attendance shifts from compulsory to voluntary. Mare notes that the lack of attendance and the college tuition paid by students results in reduced anti-school behavior and encourages more motivation and capabilities than high school and other lower education levels. Therefore, the Mare Model was used to uncover how economics governing education impacted children's growth and education level.

=== Drawbacks of the Mare Model ===
Over the years, many scientists have continued to contribute to the influence of the Mare Model with their own research using new cohorts. However, many scientists have held reservations about the conclusions and models used by Mare due to data misalignment. One particular concern of the Mare Model is that it is measured in the educational years. For example, 13th grade would refer to college, while 17th grade would refer to graduate school. Therefore, a major problem with this model was that it could not account for outliers in this study, such as those that had to repeat grades, skip grades, or took more than 4 years of college. This could lead to significant overlap between the distinctive stages that the Mare Model proposed and could modify some of the earlier conclusions that were made. Another vital concern was the lack of heterogeneity in this model. The main concerns of these researchers were that the Mare Model was too rigid in its stages due to these models being discrete time event history models, which measure the timing of a specific event in a distinct interval. Therefore, these models were limited to analyzing specific periods of time, which can lead to selection bias by researchers who choose specific intervals that show association. Mare attempted to resolve this concern using the OLS model (Ordinary Least Square model) that was able to account for this heterogeneity concern; however, it also removed the ability to answer some vital questions about changes across educational levels. Another major concern from Mare's model is the many unknown social factors that are hard to uncover or estimate without being known beforehand. Therefore, researchers would have lurking variables that impact education progression, but these variables would be difficult to decipher without having already known them beforehand.

=== Legacy of the Mare Model ===
Today, the Mare Model is still being used more than 40 years after its inception in 1977. However, its enduring impact can be attributed to both the continued significance of educational stages and advanced statistical tools created by this method. In addition, the model is sustained by continued effort by Mare and his colleagues to address the drawbacks of the model with novel solutions. In addition, the Mare Model provided insight into uncovering the modern educational system and how they have changed over time by various factors, such as peer and parental influence. However, the Mare's model effects continue to grow to have an international presence; 13 countries around the world, like Australia and Italy, have used the Mare model to draw conclusions about their own educational system and the factors that influence it. Therefore, the Mare Model maintained the depth of knowledge that can be procured about education levels while also being flexible enough to be adopted by many different local, national, and international educational cohorts. Mare modeled education, the central explanatory variable in the Blau-Duncan model, as a sequential transition of the progress from lower to higher educational achievement. Mare treated educational achievement as a series of transitions rather than a mere outcome. This conceptual shift provides a detailed processing analysis of data for each specific educational stage to understand the impact of socioeconomic background on educational achievement.

== Neighborhood choice and the dynamics of residential segregation ==
=== Future opportunities for children ===
Mare conducted extensive research on the relationships between neighborhood conditions, race, and social mobility. This included various disciplines, including a focus on how children's future opportunities are shaped by the economic characteristics of their neighborhoods. This includes how moving residences influence exposure to advantages or disadvantages. Mare researched using data from the Los Angeles Family and Neighborhood Survey (L.A. FANS) and the Child Development Supplement (CDS) of the Panel Study of Income Dynamics (PSID), demonstrating the significance of residential mobility in shaping children's experiences with neighborhood poverty. Mare additionally found that mobility is not randomly distributed, and patterns of relocation influence whether children move to areas with greater or lesser economic resources. For example, Black children in the Western United States experience a wider range of economic environments when they move.

=== Race and ethnicity ===
Mare delved into race and ethnicity and how they are factors influencing patterns of residential mobility and neighborhood exposure. Mare, using data from the Multi-City Study of Urban Inequality (MCSUI) and the Detroit Area Studies (DAS), has examined neighborhood preferences among different racial and ethnic groups. Using the survey data from Detroit, Mare identified shifts in attitudes toward neighborhood racial composition, which influenced mobility trends. For example, black households may relocate from neighborhoods undergoing demographic changes, often moving to suburban or middle-class areas. These findings by Mare defined mobility patterns that can contribute to broader trends in racial segregation and economic stratification across urban areas.

=== Residential mobility ===
==== Instability of mixed-income neighborhoods ====
In collaboration with Robert Sampson and others, Mare and his collaborators found that neighborhoods labeled as mix-income are generally more unhinged compared to either affluent or poor neighborhoods. This instability is due to the dynamical nature of residential mobility and the fluidity of the economic segment.

Mare's work on mixed-income neighborhoods provided a nuanced understanding of the complexities involved in fulfilling and maintaining economic integration in urban residential studies. The findings revealed policy implications addressing the underlying factors that influence residential mobility.

=== Perception of neighborhoods ===
Mare analyzed neighborhood preferences to identify causes of residential segregation. He examined whether people perceive neighborhood racial composition on a spectrum or follow a threshold model, moving only when a certain demographic level is reached. Mare used data from MCSUI and DAS to estimate preference patterns among racial and ethnic groups, showing variations in how individuals make residential decisions. Mare, along with Elizabeth Brucht, empirically examined Thomas Schelling's tipping model, which explains how even mild preferences for living among one's own racial group can lead to substantial segregation. Mare has used models that suggest that if individuals are indifferent to small demographic shifts, large-scale "tipping" effects—where neighborhoods transition rapidly from one racial composition to another—are unlikely. However, those models indicate that segregation can increase if individuals respond to demographic changes by relocating once a certain composition is reached. Their research demonstrated that individuals' sensitivity and evaluation to slight changes in neighborhood composition can exert influence on the dynamics of residential segregation. This work was subsequently published in the American Journal of Sociology in 2006. The paper represented a major effort to conduct empirical research to ground Schelling's approach.

=== Residential segregation simulations ===
Mare utilized agent-based modeling to examine residential segregation by simulating individual decision-making processes and their collective impact on neighborhood demographics. Mare's modifications to Schelling's segregation model have demonstrated that varying assumptions about individual preferences can result in different segregation outcomes. These models suggest that neighborhood structures evolve as individuals make relocation decisions, with each move influenced by prior migration patterns. By incorporating dynamic factors, Mare can provide insight into the mechanisms through which segregation persists.

==== Interplay between residential choice, segregation, and assortative mating ====
Mare used two-sex models of assortative mating and discrete choice models of residential mobility to jointly model neighborhood and partner choice. The simulations reveal that assortative mating and residential mobility are mutually reinforcing processes that endure ethnic segregation in Stockholm.

The article on residential segregation and associative mating is a particular validation of Mare's broader ambitions with these Swedish data. The paper serves as evidence of the connection between demographic processes and social stratification.

=== Methodology ===
==== Use of longitudinal analyses ====
Mare has also performed longitudinal approaches, which allow researchers to account for changes in residential location over time. He highlighted that cross-sectional studies provide a static view of neighborhood influences, and that longitudinal analyses are beneficial to researchers to track shifts in children's residential environments to examine how mobility alters exposure to neighborhood characteristics. Mare used L.A. FANS to indicate that children in Los Angeles typically move among neighborhoods with similar socioeconomic compositions.

==== Discrete choice models ====
Mare-applied discrete choice models have also been employed to estimate residential preferences and mobility patterns. These models generate quantitative estimates of how economic and demographic factors influence housing decisions and predict neighborhood transitions based on those parameters. By integrating transition rates and neighborhood characteristics, Mare has developed aggregate models of neighborhood change, contributing to an understanding of long-term residential mobility trends and spatial inequality.

== Educational assortative mating ==
Educational assortative mating is the tendency of people to marry and have children with people from the same socioeconomic and, more importantly, according to Mare, similar academic backgrounds. Mare did work on tracking the tendency and rate at which these sorts of pairs happen and the effects that had on propagating intergenerational social stratification. Mare's work looked at the trends in these sorts of relationships over time.

=== Historical trends ===
Mare tracked three distinct periods in this tendency for assortative mating.

- The first of these periods is from 1940 to 1960. During this period, there is a decrease in the likelihood of marrying within similar educational levels. This is likely due to a post-war increase in social mobility due to social policies such as the GI Bill.
- The second period is from the 1960s until the 1970s. During this period, there was an increase in this sort of assortative mating. This was a period when increased education stratification started to follow closely with increased social stratification.
- The third and final period is from the 1970s until the present. This period is defined by an increase in the trend from the previous period. College graduates are marrying other college graduates at a higher rate than ever before.

=== Factors that influence educational assortative mating ===
Mare described three factors that led to this trend in assortative mating. One factor described by Mare is social preferences. Individuals tend to choose partners with similar values and lifestyles. Therefore, it is likely for people who value and have a life defined by college education to marry others who share this. Another factor in this trend is the structural barriers that exist between people of different educational backgrounds. For example, people with different educational backgrounds tend to work in different fields, a common way for spouses to meet each other. The third factor he outlined is the timing of schooling and marriage. He described how people tend to get married following higher education; therefore, they tend to marry people from their school.

=== Societal changes and its impact on assortative mating ===
The expansion of higher education has led to an increase in assortative marriage trends. For example, as more people attain higher education, there is more opportunity for homogamous marriage. Another societal factor that influenced this trend is the increase in educational assortative mating; there is an increase in the number of women in higher education. Women in higher education tend to prioritize marrying people with similar education levels. There is also a correlation between an increase in income inequality and assortative mating.

=== Research methods ===
Mare sourced his data through the Integrated Public Use Micro-data Series (IPUMS) and Current Population Survey (CPS). He employed a log-linear model to study the trends in homogamy and intermarriage. His findings were that homogamy increased between 1960 and the present day, and that there has been a rise in difficulty in crossing educational barriers.

=== Implications and future considerations ===
Mare described how this trend of assortative marriage increases preexisting social stratification, further solidifying the divide between educated and uneducated people. He also discussed how one thing that may influence this going forward is the trend of people getting married later in life. This may result in a decrease in assortative marriages. This leads him to question if this trend will continue.

=== Legacy ===
Mare's first article on assortative mating was published in the American Sociological Review in 1991. This article became a blockbuster at that time. His claim that rises in educational homogamy may widen the inequality gap among families in the socioeconomic achievement of their offspring has sparked subsequent research in this domain.

== The demography of inequality ==
Mare maintained the vision to advance research on social inequality and intergenerational social mobility by incorporating many demographic mechanisms that shape population characteristics.

- By 1990, Mare deemed demography more seriously in the study of mobility. He engaged in studying the socioeconomic composition of families, marriage and partnering, as well as the education of offspring, in response to the Blau-Duncan model.
- Together with Maralani, they proposed a multigenerational model that incorporates demographic explanatory variables including family background, marriage, fertility, and mortality in social mobility.
- Later on, Song and Mare developed a two-sex model that considers gender variances and longer time spans of social mobility. Their research generated detailed processing of gender and multigenerational data to analyze the effects of assortative mating on lower fertility rates among high-status families.

=== Multigenerational process ===
Mare disentangled the parents-child dyads to build a more comprehensive model for the demographic and stratification patterns of the United States for roughly a half century. They found that the arrangement of a more assortative marriage pattern, the lower fertility rate in the high-status couples, and the relative enhanced survival among lower-status offspring resulted in less inequality in the long run compared with a single generation's short-term turnover.

=== Methodological innovation ===
Song and Mare developed the crossover between the prospective and retrospective views of mobility and proposed a correction that eliminates 95% of the bias in retrospective data. His integration with prospective and retrospective data effectively increases the accuracy of measurement in studies of intergenerational social mobility.

== Awards and positions ==
- Guggenheim Fellowship: Received in 1994 from the John Simon Guggenheim Memorial Foundation.
- Paul F. Lazarsfeld Award for lifetime achievement from the Methodology Section of the American Sociological Association (ASA) in 1999.
- Roger Gould Prize: Awarded by the American Journal of Sociology in 2006–2007, shared with Elizabeth Bruch.
- James S. Coleman Best Article Award: Granted by the American Sociological Association's Section on Rationality and Society for 2005–2007, shared with Elizabeth Bruch.
- Robert Park Best Article Award: Conferred by the American Sociological Association's Section on Community and Urban Sociology in 2006, shared with Elizabeth Bruch.
- President of the International Sociological Association Research Committee 28 on Social Stratification and Mobility: Served as president in 2006.
- President of the Population Association of America: Served as president in 2010.
- Elected to American Academy of Arts and Sciences and the National Academy of Sciences, both in 2010.
- Robert M. Hauser Award from the Inequality, Poverty, and Mobility Section of the ASA in 2016.

== Personal life ==
Mare was married to Judith Seltzer, also a sociologist and demographer retired from UCLA, who served as President of the PAA in 2016. They met in graduate school at the University of Michigan. He retired in 2015. Mare died of leukemia on February 1, 2021.
