= Wendy Griswold =

American sociologist

- Education: Cornell University (A.B.); Duke University (M.A.); Harvard University (M.A., Ph.D.)
- Known for: sociology of culture, sociology of literature
- Scientific career
- Fields: Sociology
- Workplaces: Northwestern University University of Chicago
- Academic advisors: Ann Swidler, Harrison White

Wendy Griswold (born c. 1946) is an American sociologist, professor of sociology and the Bergen Evans Professor in the Humanities at Northwestern University, prior to that she was the Arthur E. Andersen Research and Teaching Professor, also at Northwestern University. She is a Guggenheim Fellow and well known for her contributions to the sociology of culture and the sociology of literature. She is the author of nine books, among them, Bearing Witness: Readers, Writers, and the Novel in Nigeria won the "Best Book" award from the Culture Section of the American Sociological Association in 2002 and the academic journal Choice named it one of the year's outstanding academic books.

== Life and career ==
Griswold graduated from Cornell University with an A.B. in English in 1968, and then from Duke University with an M.A. in English in 1970. From 1969 to 1975, Griswold worked for New England Telephone and Telegraph Company. She then went to Harvard University, completing an M.A. in 1979 and a PhD in 1980, both in sociology. Her dissertation was entitled: "Renaissance revivals: the continuing interaction between culture and society," and her advisors were Ann Swidler and Harrison C. White. Griswold's first publication was "American character and the American novel: An expansion of reflection theory in the sociology of literature" published in the American Journal of Sociology in 1981, and she published her dissertation as a book in 1986 as Renaissance revivals: City comedy and revenge tragedy in the London theatre, 1576-1980. In her dissertation and subsequent book, Griswold first put forth the "cultural diamond" which Gary Alan Fine considered "Perhaps the central conceptual model within the sociology of culture approach." Prior to joining Northwestern University, Griswold was faculty at the University of Chicago.

Griswold is married to the political scientist and historian John F. Padgett.

== Contributions ==
Ultimately, Griswold's work contributed heavily to the "production of culture" perspective pioneered by Richard A. Peterson (a student of Alvin Gouldner) as well as Paul Dimaggio, a member of Griswold's Harvard cohort. This approach considers the social organization of the situations in which cultural products (like literature, art, music, etc...) are produced, and the ways in which such social organization structures the cultural output. In addition, as her work focus explicitly on literature, her work considers the distribution of readers in a population, and the related idea of cultural regionalism.
