= Michèle Lamont =

Canadian sociologist (born 1957)

- Born: December 15, 1957 (age 68); Toronto, Ontario, Canada
- Children: 3

Academic background
- Education: University of Ottawa; University of Paris

Academic work
- Discipline: Sociology
- Institutions: University of Texas at Austin; Princeton University; Harvard University
- Doctoral students: Crystal Marie Fleming

Michèle Lamont is the Robert I. Goldman Professor of European Studies and Professor of Sociology and African American Studies at Harvard University. Her research addresses culture and inequality; racism and anti-racism; cultural processes such as stigmatization and recognition; the sociology of morality; evaluation and higher education; and cultural and social change. She is the recipient of the C. Wright Mills Prize from the Society for the Study of Social Problems (2000), the Gutenberg Research Award (2014), the Erasmus Prize (2017), and the Kohli Prize for Sociology (2024). She has received six honorary doctorates and is a member of the American Philosophical Society, the American Academy of Arts and Sciences, the British Academy and the Royal Society of Canada. She was also appointed Chevalier de l’Ordre des Palmes académiques. She served as president of the American Sociological Association from 2016 to 2017.

== Biography ==
Lamont was born 1957 in Toronto, Ontario, Canada. She completed a Bachelor of Arts and a Master of Arts in political theory at the University of Ottawa in 1979. She earned her Doctor of Philosophy degree in sociology from the Université de Paris in 1983 and held a postdoctoral fellowship at Stanford University from 1983 to 1985. She taught at the University of Texas at Austin (1985–1987) and Princeton University (1987–2003), before joining the faculty at Harvard University (2003–present). She is married to sociologist Frank Dobbin and together they have three children.

== Career ==
From 2002 to 2019, Lamont served as co-director of the Successful Societies Program of the Canadian Institute for Advanced Research with political scientists Peter Hall (2002–16) and Paul Pierson (2016-19). The group has produced two books: Successful Societies: How Institutions and Culture Affect Health (2009) and Social Resilience in the Neo-Liberal Era (2013). In 2019, Lamont and Paul Pierson co-edited a special issue of Daedalus on "Inequality as a Multidimensional Process." In connection with this program, she collaborated with the Robert Wood Johnson Foundation on research related to “the culture of health.” With the foundation's vice president for research, Lamont co-edited a 2016 special issue of Social Science and Medicine on "Mutuality, Mobilization, and Messaging." She worked with researchers from the Beijer Institute and the Stockholm Resilience Center (Royal Academy of Sweden), on "Our future in the Anthropocene biosphere," a White Paper prepared for the 2021 Nobel Summit on sustainability (2021). She co-chaired the advisory board to the 2022 UN Human Development Report, "Uncertain times, Unsettled Lives: Shaping our Future in a World in Transformation.”

In 2009 and 2010, Lamont was Senior Advisor on Faculty Development and Diversity in the Faculty of Arts and Sciences at Harvard University. From 2014 to 2021, she served as acting director and then director of the Weatherhead Center for International Affairs (WCFIA). Since 2018, she has led the WCFIA Research Cluster on Comparative Inequality and Inclusion.

From 2006 to 2009, Lamont chaired the Council for European Studies. She served as president elect, president, and past president of the American Sociological Association between 2016 and 2018. She led the response of the ASA to the Trump Presidency.

Lamont has held visiting professorships at the Collège de France, SciencesPo, Université de Paris 8, École des Hautes Études en Sciences Sociales, Mainz University, Tel Aviv University, University of Manchester, and the University of Hong Kong. She has been a fellow at the Center for Advanced Study in Behavioral Studies at Stanford University (2002), the Radcliffe Institute for Advanced Studies (2006), the Russell Sage Foundation (1996; 2019-2020), the Netherlands Institute for Advanced Studies (2024), and the Paris Institute for Advanced Study (2025). Lamont is a member of the Academic Senate at the Swedish Collegium for Advanced Study in Uppsala, Sweden. Her research has been supported by grants including grants from the Hewlett Foundation, the Freedom Together Foundation, the National Science Foundation, and the Robert Wood Johnson Foundation. Other awards include a John Simon Guggenheim Memorial Foundation Fellowship, Leverhulme Trust Fellowship, and Andrew Carnegie Fellowship (2019–21).

Lamont has served on scientific boards for the American Council of Learned Societies (ACLS), The Graduate Institute of International and Development Studies (IHEID), the Open Society Foundations, the Max Planck Institute for the Study of Religious and Ethnic Diversity, Princeton Institute for International and Regional Studies (PIIRS) and Nordic Centre for Research on Gender Equality in Research and Innovation (NORDICORE).

== Contributions to sociology ==
Lamont's major works examine how shared concepts of worth shape social hierarchies and inequality, with a focus on the role of various cultural processes in their creation and reproduction. Her more recent books are Getting Respect: Responding to Stigma and Discrimination in the United States, Brazil, and Israel (2016) and Seeing Others: How Recognition Works and How it Help Heal a Divided World (2023).

In her early writing, Lamont offered an empirical and theoretical critique of the work of Pierre Bourdieu, with whom she studied in Paris. In her first book, Money, Morals, Manners: The Culture of the French and the American Upper-Middle Class (1992), she argued that Bourdieu's theories of cultural capital and habitus ignore moral status signals and national repertoires that explain differences in American and French class cultures. This work contributed to setting the stage for a large American literature engaging critically with and building on Bourdieu’s work, coinciding with the rise of cultural sociology in the United States. Along with fellow sociologists such as Ann Swidler, Paul DiMaggio, Robert Wuthnow, and Viviana Zelizer, Lamont contributed to discussions that shaped the study of "meaning-making" in sociology. Their research emphasized the importance of considering culture as explanans and explanandum in the social sciences, rather than treating it as a "residual category". Since the late 1990s, she has co-edited the Princeton Studies in Cultural Sociology series at Princeton University Press, with Paul DiMaggio, Robert Wuthnow and Viviana Zelizer.

In their paper “The Study of Boundaries across the Social Sciences” (2002), Lamont and Virág Molnár examined how boundary work is studied across domains such as identity, professions, knowledge, race, and class. They proposed a distinction between "symbolic" and "social" boundaries as a framework for analyzing how individual worldviews relate to structural phenomena such as inequality. They defined symbolic boundaries as "conceptual distinctions made by social actors... that separate people into groups and generate feelings of similarity and group membership," and social boundaries are "objectified forms of social differences manifested in unequal access to an unequal distribution of resources… and social opportunities." They argued that symbolic boundaries are a "necessary but insufficient" condition for social change: only when widely shared do they become social boundaries." They also analyze the properties of boundaries and how they become more porous.

Lamont extended her "boundary-work" approach to the case of American and French race relations. In The Dignity of Working Men (2002), Lamont analyzed how white and African-American conceptions of class relate to differing ideals of self-worth. In Getting Respect (2016), she and co-authors compared how stigmatized groups respond to ethnoracial exclusion in the United States, Brazil, and Israel.

In How Professors Think: Inside the Curious World of Academic Judgment (2009), Lamont examined how scholars in the social sciences and humanities evaluate originality, significance, and related criteria. This book also explored the roles of self, emotion and interaction in evaluation, and has been discussed in debates on funding, evaluation, and audit culture in the United States and Europe. The book raised questions about whether the social sciences should be evaluated using different criteria than the natural sciences. Around the same time, Lamont co-edited, with Patricia White, the National Science Foundation report “The Evaluation of Systematic Qualitative Research in the Social Sciences” (2008), which assessed how peer review practices could better recognize methodological rigor and innovation in qualitative research.

Lamont later outlined a broader program in the sociology of evaluation, including her 2012 article "Toward a Sociology of Valuation and Evaluation", which connects to the growing interest in the sociology of valuation. She continued this line of work in her 2014 article, “What is Missing? Cultural Processes and Causal Pathways to Inequality.”

In recent years, Lamont has expanded her research on recognition, dignity, and cultural processes of evaluation through a series of public-facing and scholarly projects. Her 2019 article “From ‘Having’ to ‘Being’: self-worth and the current crisis of American society,” published in The British Journal of Sociology, proposed shifting the analysis of inequality toward the symbolic dimensions of recognition and moral worth. Building on this line of inquiry, she delivered the TED Talk How to Heal a Divided World in 2021, emphasizing how societies can redefine notions of worth to foster inclusion and belonging. That same year, she presented the lecture "Destigmatization: Breaking the Wall to Universal Dignity" at the Falling Walls Science Summit, which was selected as one of the Top Ten Breakthroughs in the Social Sciences and Humanities. These projects culminated in her 2023 book Seeing Others: How Recognition Works and How It Can Heal a Divided World, which synthesizes four decades of research to argue that expanding “recognition” beyond material success can strengthen social cohesion and collective well-being. Lamont is also collaborating with the European Quality of Life Survey produced by the European Foundation for the Improvement of Living and Working Conditions to study recognition across all EU countries, including the recognition gap between urban and rural populations.

== Selected awards and honors ==
- Kohli Prize for Sociology (2024)
- Honorary Doctorate, University of Warwick (2022)
- TEDWomen Speaker (2021)
- Top Ten Breakthroughs in Social Sciences and Humanities Award, Falling Walls Foundation (2021)
- Honorary Doctorate, University of Warwick (2020)
- Honorary Doctorate, Uppsala University (2020)
- Andrew Carnegie Fellow, Carnegie Corporation of New York (2019)
- Elected Corresponding Fellow, British Academy (2019)
- Erasmus Prize (2017)
- Honorary Doctorate, University of Ottawa (2017)
- Honorary Doctorate, Université de Bordeaux (2017)
- Honorary Doctorate, University of Amsterdam (2017)
- 108th President, American Sociological Association (President-elect: 2015–16; Past-president, 2017–2018)
- Elected Member, Royal Society of Canada (2015)
- Chevalier de l’Ordre des Palmes Académiques, Gouvernement Français (2014)
- Gutenberg Research Award, Johannes Gutenberg University (2014)

== Selected bibliography ==
- Lamont, Michèle (2023). Seeing Others: How Recognition Works and How It Can Heal a Divided World. New York: One Signal, Simon and Schuster; London: Penguin.
- Lamont, Michèle; Moraes Silva, Graziella; Welburn, Jessica S.; Guetzkow, Joshua; Mizrachi, Nissim; Herzog, Hanna; Reislast, Elisa (2017). Getting Respect: Responding to Stigma and Discrimination in the United States, Brazil, and Israel. Princeton, NJ: Princeton University Press. ISBN 978-0-691-16707-7.
- Lamont, Michele; Hall, Peter A., eds. (2013). Social Resilience in the Neoliberal Era. Cambridge: Cambridge University Press. ISBN 978-1-139-54242-5.
- Lamont, Michele (2009). How Professors Think: Inside the Curious World of Academic Judgment. Cambridge, MA: Harvard University Press. ISBN 978-0-674-05733-3.
- Lamont, Michele (2002). The Dignity of Working Men: Morality and the Boundaries of Race, Class, and Immigration. Cambridge: Harvard University Press and New York: Russell Sage Foundation. ISBN 978-0-674-00992-9.
- Lamont, Michele (1992). Wolfe, Alan (ed.). Money, Morals and Manners: The Culture of the French and the American Upper-Middle Class. Morality and Society series. University of Chicago Press. ISBN 978-0-674-00992-9.
- Lamont, Michele; Pierson, Paul (2019). "Inequality as a Multidimensional Process". Daedalus. 148 (3). doi:10.1162/daed_a_01748. S2CID 84181880.
- Lamont, Michele (2019). "From 'having' to 'being': self-worth and the current crisis of American society". The British Journal of Sociology. 70 (3): 660–707. doi:10.1111/1468-4446.12667. PMID 31190392. S2CID 189815689.
- Lamont, Michele (2018). "Addressing Recognition Gaps: Destigmatization and the Reduction of Inequality". American Sociological Review. 83 (3): 419–444. doi:10.1177/0003122418773775. S2CID 149672040.
- Lamont, Michele; Beljean, Stefan; Clair, Matthew (2014). "What is missing? Cultural processes and causal pathways to inequality". Socio-Economic Review. 12 (3): 573–608. doi:10.1093/ser/mwu011.
