= Patrik Aspers =

Swedish sociologist

Patrik Aspers (born 1970) is a Swedish sociologist, who is, since 2019, chair of Sociology at the University of St. Gallen, Switzerland. He has previously worked in several countries. His research has mostly been on sociological theory and economic sociology, often drawing on phenomenology. Markets are the central topic of his research, and empirically he has mainly studied the fashion industry. Aspers has written on market fashioning, ontology, and uncertainty. He has developed sociological concepts such as "aesthetic markets", "status markets" and "standard markets".

Aspers has a long term project, Being and Order, which started in 2005, and will be ended in 2035. The main issue is to bring questions and the phenomenon of social order, which is organized and the result of mutual adjustment, in relation to question of who and what we are, and, ultimately, our own existence. Most of Aspers publications deal with both being and order, but until the book Uncertainty: Individual Problems and Public Solutions (2024), the focus was on order.

Aspers works draws much on phenomenology. This was clear already in his dissertation, Markets in Fashion, A Phenomenological Approach (2001). It was drawin much on Husserl and Schütz, in addition to sociologcal theoreis, primarily the works on markets by Harrison White. In later works of Aspers, Heidegger and the practice approach has become more central.

Aspers has made substantial contributions to the field of qualitative research. He wrote a methods book in 2007 (Etnografiska Metoder, second ed. 2011). He has also published articles on qualitative research and its practices, in the text Empirical Phenomenology: The Cologne Seminars.]

== Background ==
Aspers earned his PhD at Stockholm University (2001). He studied under the supervision of Richard Swedberg. Harrison White is also among the teachers he had as a PhD student. He has previously worked or been a visiting scholar; for example, Uppsala University, Stockholm University, Harvard University, Columbia University, the London School of Economics, College de France, and Max Planck Institute for the Study of Societies. Aspers was President of the Swedish Sociological Association (2010–2012). He has been the president of the Swiss Sociological Association (2026-2027). Aspers was eleted Dean of the SHSS - tth school of social sciences and humanities - at the university of St. Gallen (2026-2028). He is director at the Institute of the Institute for the Internaional Management and Diversity Management (2026-), also at the University of St. Gallen.

== Selected publications ==
- Markets in Fashion, A Phenomenological Approach. London: Routledge (2nd Revised edition). 2006 [2001]. "Empirical Phenomenology: A Qualitative Research Approach (the Cologne Seminars)." Indo-Pacific Journal of Phenomenology 9(2):1-12. 2009.
- "Using Design for Upgrading in the Fashion Industry", The Journal of Economic Geography, 10 (2): 167–188, 2010
- Orderly Fashion, A Sociology of Markets. Princeton: Princeton UP. 2010.
- Markets. Cambridge: Polity. 2011.
- With Ugo Corte.. "What Is Qualitative in Qualitative Research." Qualitative Sociology 42(2):139-60. doi: 10.1007/s11133-019-9413-7. 2019
- Uncertainty: Individual Problems and Public Solutions. Oxford: Oxford University Press. 2024.
