= Hannah Brückner =

Sociologist

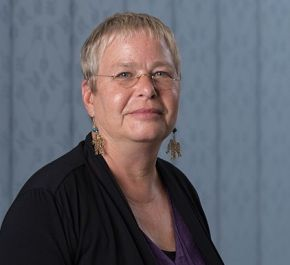
Hannah Brückner

Hannah Brückner (born in 1958) is a sociologist known for her contributions to several interdisciplinary fields, including life course studies, adolescent health, inequality, health, gender, and sexuality. She is an emeritus professor of Social Research and Public Policy at NYU Abu Dhabi.

Prior to her tenure at NYU Abu Dhabi, Brückner was a professor of sociology at Yale University.

== Career ==
Hannah Brückner earned her PhD at the University of North Carolina at Chapel Hill.

Brückner received NSF funding in 2013 for a two-year grant for $70,000 to investigate indications of systematic gender bias in both contributors and content in the reference tool Wikipedia. The project entitled 'Collaborative Research: Wikipedia and the Democratization of Academic Knowledge,' studied ways that gender bias is influenced in the crowd sourced Wikipedia mainspace. Additionally, the research investigated the prevalence of gender bias across different academic disciplines. both focus areas use qualitative and quantitative techniques.

Current research projects focus on the representation of academics and academic knowledge on Wikipedia (specifically gender discrimination) for which she has received National Science Foundation funding to investigate systematic gender bias in both contributors and content in the reference tool of Wikipedia. Brückner also studies the impact of labor migration on gender inequality in Kerala, India.

Brückner received grants from the Robert Wood Johnson Foundation and the Volkswagen Foundation to support her research. In 2006, she received an Andrew W. Mellon New Directions Fellowship.

== Selected publications ==
=== Books & chapters in edited volumes ===
Brückner, Hannah. Gender Inequality in the Life Course. Social Change and Stability in West Germany, 1975-1995. Somerset, NJ: Transaction Publishers, 2004.

Brückner, Hannah: Surveys. Chapter for the Handbook of Analytical Sociology, edited by Peter Hedstrom and Peter Bearman. Oxford University Press. Published online: June 2017.

Brückner, Hannah and Peter Bearman: Dating Behavior and Sexual Activity Among Young Adolescents, pp. 31–56 in 14 and Younger: The Sexual Behavior of Young Adolescents. Edited by Bill Albert, Sarah Brown, and Christine M. Flanigan. Washington, DC: Campaign to Prevent Teen Pregnancy.

=== Peer-reviewed articles ===
Natalie Nitsche and Hannah Brückner: Late, but not too late? Postponement of First Birth among Highly Educated Women in the US, Birth Cohorts 1920-1985. European Journal of Population 37 (2021): 371–403.

Ann Morning, Hannah Brückner, and Alondra Nelson: Socially Desirable Reporting and the Expression of Biological Concepts of Race. DuBois Review, 2019. https://doi.org/10.1017/S1742058X19000195

Julia Adams, Hannah Brückner, and Cambria Naslund: Who Counts as a Notable Sociologist on Wikipedia? Gender, Race and the ‘Professor Test’. Socius: Sociological Research for a Dynamic World, 2019. https://doi.org/10.1177%2F2378023118823946

Sharon H. Green, Charlotte Wang, Swethaa S. Ballakrishnen, Hannah Brückner, Peter Bearman: Patterned Remittances Enhance Women's Health-Related Autonomy. SSM – Population Health. https://doi.org/10.1016/j.ssmph.2019.100370

Luo, Wei, Julia Adams, and Hannah Brückner. The Ladies Vanish? American Sociology and the Genealogy of its Missing Women on Wikipedia. Comparative Sociology, 17 (2018): 519–556. https://doi.org/10.1163/15691330-12341471
