= American Journal of Sociology =

Bimonthly peer-reviewed academic journal

- Discipline: Sociology
- Language: English
- Edited by: John Levi Martin

Publication details
- History: 1895–present
- Publisher: University of Chicago Press for the Department of Sociology at the University of Chicago (United States)
- Frequency: Bimonthly
- Impact factor: 3.232 (2019)

Standard abbreviations
- ISO 4: Am. J. Sociol.

Indexing
- CODEN: AJSOAR
- ISSN: 0002-9602 (print); 1537-5390 (web)
- LCCN: 05031884
- JSTOR: 00029602
- OCLC no.: 42017129

Links
- Journal homepage

The American Journal of Sociology (abbreviated AJS) is a bimonthly peer-reviewed academic journal that publishes original research and book reviews in the field of sociology and related social sciences. It was founded in 1895 as the first US journal in its discipline. Along with the American Sociological Review, it is considered one of the top journals in the academic field of sociology. The current editor is John Levi Martin. For its entire history, the journal has been housed at the University of Chicago and published by the University of Chicago Press.

== History ==
For its first thirty years, the American Sociological Society (now the American Sociological Association) was largely dominated by the Department of Sociology at the University of Chicago, and the quasi-official journal of the association was the American Journal of Sociology.

The first issue of the American Journal of Sociology was published in July 1895. In the first 25 years of the journal, the most prominent subjects were social theory and social psychology. In the 1920s, statistical work became increasingly prominent in the journal. Over the period 1920–1944, the journal's most prominent subject matters were social theory, social psychology, human ecology, and institutional theory.

In 1935, the executive committee of the American Sociological Society voted 5 to 4 against disestablishing the American Journal of Sociology as the official journal of society, but the measure was passed on for consideration of the general membership, which voted 2 to 1 to establish a new journal independent of the University of Chicago: the American Sociological Review.

== Past editors ==
Past editors-in-chief of the journal have been:

- Albion Small (1895–1926)
- Ellsworth Faris (1933–1936)
- Ernest Burgess (1936–1940)
- Herbert Blumer (1940–1952)
- Everett Hughes (1952–1957)
- Peter Rossi (1957–1958)
- Everett Hughes (1959–1960)
- Peter Blau (1960–1966)
- C. Arnold Anderson (1966–1973)
- Charles Bidwell (1973–1978)
- Edward Laumann (1978–1984)
- William Parish (1984–1992)
- Marta Tienda (1992–1996)
- Edward Laumann (1996–1997)
- Roger V. Gould (1997–2000)
- Andrew Abbott (2000–2016)
- Elisabeth S. Clemens (2016–2022)
- John Levi Martin (2022–present)

From 1926 to 1933, the journal was co-edited by a number of different members of the University of Chicago faculty including Ellsworth Faris, Robert E. Park, Ernest Burgess, Fay-Cooper Cole, Marion Talbot, Frederick Starr, Edward Sapir, Louis Wirth, Eyler Simpson, Edward Webster, Edwin Sutherland, William Ogburn, Herbert Blumer, and Robert Redfield.

== Abstracting and indexing ==
According to the Journal Citation Reports, its 2019 impact factor was 3.232, ranking it 8th out of 150 journals in the category "Sociology".

== Roger V. Gould Prize ==
In 2002, the American Journal of Sociology created the Roger V. Gould prize in memory of its former editor. The $1,000 prize is awarded annually at the American Sociological Association annual meeting to the paper from the previous volume of the journal that most "clearly embodies Roger's ideals as a sociologist: clarity, rigor, and scientific ambition combined with imagination on the one hand and a sure sense of empirical interest, importance, and accuracy on the other." Winners include Peter Bearman, John Levi Martin, David C. Stark, Michael J. Rosenfeld, Elizabeth E. Bruch, Robert D. Mare, Shelley Correll, and Roberto Garvía.
