= RSF =

RSF is commonly abbreviated for the Rapid Support Forces, a Sudanese paramilitary force and rebel group in the ongoing civil war in Sudan.

RSF may also refer to:

== Groups, organizations ==
- Religious Society of Friends, a Christian religious group, the Quakers
- Reporters Without Borders (RSF; French: Reporters Sans Frontières)
- Republican Sinn Féin, a small political party in Ireland
- Road Safety Foundation in the UK and Ireland
- Russell Sage Foundation, a philanthropic foundation and publisher
- Russian Socialist Federation of the Socialist Party of America

=== Sports and games ===
- Racing Steps Foundation, a UK motorsports support organization
- Roar Supporters Federation, a fan association for Brisbane Roar FC, Brisbane, Queensland, Australia

=== Other military organizations ===
- Ranger Strike Forces, Kenya Special Forces
- Regiment Special Force, Sri Lankan Air Force; an elite unit
- Reserve Strike Force, I Corps (Sri Lanka); a rapid reaction force
- Rhodesian Security Forces, the military and security forces of the government of former Rhodesia (1964–1980)
- Royal Scots Fusiliers, former line infantry regiment of the British Army (1678–1959)
- Rwandan Security Forces, part of the Rwanda Defence Force

=== Fictional groups ===
- Republican Security Forces, a fictional fascist militia in the British science fiction series Doctor Who

== Arts, entertainment, media; sports and games ==
- Rainbow Serpent Festival, an arts, music and lifestyle festival in Victoria, Australia
- Referee stopped fight, in boxing
- Right Said Fred, British music band
- Royal straight flush, a hand in poker
- RSF, a French synthesizer manufacturer. See RSF Kobol for an example.

== Other uses ==
- Rancho Santa Fe, a settlement in California, USA
- Recovery Support Function, a component of the National Disaster Recovery Framework (NDRF)
- Rentable Square Feet, a measure of floor area (building)
- Resource selection function, in ecology
- RSF: The Russell Sage Foundation Journal of the Social Sciences
