= Ronald Breiger =

American sociologist

- Born: New York City
- Education: Brandeis University (B.A.); Harvard University (Ph.D.)
- Known for: cultural sociology, organizational sociology, social network analysis, mathematical models
- Awards: Georg Simmel Distinguished Career Award James S. Coleman Distinguished Career Achievement Award Paul F. Lazarsfeld Award
- Scientific career
- Fields: Sociology
- Workplaces: University of Arizona
- Doctoral advisor: Harrison White
- Other academic advisors: Mark Granovetter, Thomas F. Pettigrew
- Doctoral students: Omar Lizardo

Ronald Breiger is an American sociologist and a Regents Professor, a professor of sociology and (by courtesy) government and public policy, an affiliate of the interdisciplinary graduate program in statistics and data science, and an affiliate of the interdisciplinary graduate program in applied mathematics at the University of Arizona. Prior to coming to Arizona he served on the faculties of Harvard University (assistant to associate professor) and Cornell University (professor to Goldwin Smith Professor of Sociology). He is well cited in the fields of social networks, social stratification, mathematical sociology, organizational sociology and cultural sociology and, with Linton Freeman, edited the influential academic journal Social Networks from 1998 to 2006. In 2005 he was the recipient of the Georg Simmel Distinguished Career Award of the International Network for Social Network Analysis,. In 2018 he received the James S. Coleman Distinguished Career Achievement Award of the American Sociological Association (ASA) Section on Mathematical Sociology. In 2020 he was the recipient of the Paul F. Lazarsfeld Award of the ASA Section on Methodology, recognizing a scholar who has made a career of outstanding contributions to methodology in sociology.

== Early life and career ==
Ronald Breiger grew up in Englewood, New Jersey. He received his AB Summa cum Laude at Brandeis University in 1970 with a thesis entitled: Value Conceptions in Early American Sociology. In 1975 he received a PhD from Harvard University. His dissertation was on "Dual and Multiple Networks of Social Structure". His committee consisted of Harrison White(chair), Mark Granovetter and Thomas F. Pettigrew.

In 1985–86, Breiger was a fellow of the Stanford Center for Advanced Study in the Behavioral Sciences and he was named a Fulbright Senior Scholar for 1987–88. He is also a national affiliate of the Stanford Center on Poverty and Inequality.

== Major contributions ==
Breiger's primary contributions have been to the field of social network analysis. The most widely cited are, with co-authors Harrison White and Scott A. Boorman, "Social Structure from Multiple Networks. I. Blockmodels of Roles and Positions" published in 1976. and "The Duality of Persons and Groups" published in 1974.

Beginning in 2000, Breiger devoted considerable attention to elucidating the mutual implications of social network analysis and the sociology of culture. In recent years, he and colleagues have turned regression analysis and many of its generalizations "inside out" by showing how regression modeling rests on a dual network of profile similarity among the cases.

Breiger has played an important role in applying network analytic techniques to the study of terrorism. For instance, in November 2002, Breiger chaired a workshop on dynamic social network modeling and analysis for the Committee on Human Factors of the National Academy of Sciences convened at the request of the Office of Naval Research. He is also a Research Affiliate with the National Consortium for the Study of Terrorism and Responses to Terrorism, one of the Department of Homeland Security Centers of Excellence.

In 2005 Breiger received the Georg Simmel Distinguished Career Award from the International Network for Social Network Analysis (INSNA). In 2018 he was the recipient of the James S. Coleman Distinguished Career Achievement Award given by the American Sociological Association Section on Mathematical Sociology. In 2020 he was the recipient of the Paul F. Lazarsfeld Award of the ASA Section on Methodology, recognizing a scholar who has made a career of outstanding contributions to methodology in sociology. In 2025, his book Regression Inside Out (with David Melamed and Eric W. Schoon) received the Outstanding Publication Award of the ASA Section on Methodology and the Harrison White Outstanding Book Award of the ASA Section on Mathematical Sociology.
