= Dan Clawson =

American sociologist (1948–2019)

Daniel Conness Clawson
- Born: August 18, 1948; Alexandria, Virginia, U.S.
- Died: May 7, 2019 (aged 70); Northampton, Massachusetts, U.S.
- Spouse: Mary Ann Clawson

Academic background
- Education: Ph.D
- Alma mater: Washington University in St. Louis (BA 1970) Stony Brook University (MA 1975, Ph.D 1978)
- Thesis: Class Struggle and the Rise of Bureaucracy (1978)
- Doctoral advisor: Michael Schwartz
- Other advisor: Charles Perrow

Academic work
- Discipline: Sociologist
- Institutions: University of Massachusetts, Amherst (1978-2019)
- Notable students: Jane McAlevey

Daniel Conness Clawson (18 August 1948 – 7 May 2019) was an American sociologist, professor, and activist. Clawson was Professor of Sociology at the University of Massachusetts, Amherst and former executive committee member of the Massachusetts Teachers Association, the Massachusetts affiliate of the National Education Association.

== Life ==
Clawson was born 18 August 1948 in Alexandria, Virginia and raised in nearby Chevy Chase, Maryland. Clawson first attended Carleton College then transferred to Washington University in St. Louis where he graduated in 1970. Clawson attended Students for a Democratic Society meetings at Washington University though he did not join the organization. At Washington University, Clawson met George Rawick who later came to be his mentor. Rawick, who had associated with Marxist intellectuals C.L.R. James and Martin Glaberman in Detroit, became an early influence on Clawson's politics and thought. The two read Karl Marx's Das Kapital together. For his doctoral studies, Clawson attended Stony Brook University and completed a dissertation under the supervision of Michael Schwartz.

On May 7, 2019, Clawson died of a heart attack. Clawson was married to Mary Ann Clawson, professor of sociology emeritus at Wesleyan University and father to Laura Clawson, a sociologist and editor at the Daily Kos.

=== Activism ===
Clawson was a labor activist, a member of the Massachusetts Teachers Association, and the former president of the Massachusetts Society of Professors. Clawson held leadership roles in numerous progressive organizations. Clawson was the former president of the Scholars, Artists, and Writers for Social Justice (SAWSJ), an American organization founded to produce dialog among scholars, artists, and unions, and a founding member of the Public Higher Education Network of Massachusetts (PHENOM), a grass-roots organization advocating for free higher education in the state of Massachusetts.

== Academic career ==
Clawson's entire professorial career was spent at the University of Massachusetts, Amherst where he also held an appointment at the university's Center for Research on Families. Clawson also served as a visiting scholar at the Russell Sage Foundation from 2011 to 2012. Clawson also served as an editor for two American Sociological Association publications, including Contemporary Sociology from 1995 to 1997 and to the Association's Rose Series from 2000 to 2005.

=== The Next Upsurge: Labor and the New Social Movements ===
Clawson's The Next Upsurge: Labor and the New Social Movements was published in 2003. The book was the subject of two review symposiums, one in Critical Sociology and a second in Labor History. The Next Upsurge contributes to debates on the causes for the fall in labor union membership in the United States in the second half of the twentieth century, as well as strategies for revitalizing membership growth. Clawson first argues that union membership in the United States has in the past expanded in momentary periods of accelerated growth, not incrementally, and often in tandem with other social movements. Clawson argues that part of the explanation for the decline of American organized labor was its failure to ally with one such moment of societal unrest manifested in the social movements of the 1960s, and that in order for labor unions to grow in membership again they must build solidarity with other contemporary progressive social movements. The Next Upsurge argues that to do this the American labor movement must reject business unionism and instead embrace social movement unionism in the form of greater rank and file membership control and prioritize social justice.

== Bibliography ==
=== Solely authored books ===
- Clawson, Dan (2003). The Next Upsurge: Labor and the New Social Movements. Ithaca, NY: ILR Press. ISBN 9781501722578. JSTOR 10.7591/j.ctv3mtbnp.
- Clawson, Dan (1980). Bureaucracy and the Labor Process: The Transformation of U.S. Industry, 1860-1920. New York, NY: Monthly Review Press. ISBN 9780853455431.

=== Co-authored books ===
- Clawson, Dan; Gerstel, Naomi (2014). Unequal Time: Gender, Class, and Family in Employment Schedules. New York: Russell Sage Foundation. ISBN 9781610448437.
- Clawson, Dan; Page, Max (2011). The Future of Higher Education. New York: Routledge. ISBN 9781138168923.
- Clawson, Dan; Neustadtl, Alan; Weller, Mark (1998). Dollars and Votes: How Business Campaign Contributions Subvert Democracy. Philadelphia: Temple University Press. ISBN 9781566396264.
- Clawson, Dan; Neustadtl, Alan; Scott, Denise (1992). Money Talks: Corporate PACS and Political Influence. New York: Basic Books. ISBN 9780465026807.

=== Edited books ===
- Clawson, Dan, ed. (1998). Required Reading: Sociology's Most Influential Books. Amherst, MA: University of Massachusetts Press. ISBN 9781558491533.

=== Co-edited books ===
- Kerrissey, Jasmine; Weinbaum, Eve; Hammonds, Clare; Juravich, Tom; Clawson, Dan, eds. (2020). Labor in the Time of Trump. Ithaca, NY: ILR Press. ISBN 9781501746628.
- Clawson, Dan; Zussman, Robert; Misra, Joya; Gerstel, Naomi; Stokes, Randall; Anderton, Douglas L.; Burawoy, Michael, eds. (2007). Public Sociology: Fifteen Eminent Sociologists Debate Politics and the Profession in the Twenty-first Century. Berkeley, CA: University of California Press. ISBN 9780520251380.
- Gerstel, Naomi; Clawson, Dan; Zussman, Robert, eds. (2002). Families at Work: Expanding the Boundaries. Nashville, TN: Vanderbilt University Press. ISBN 9780826513977.
