= Sigal Alon =

Academic Sociologist and inequality researcher

- Education: Tel Aviv University; Ben-Gurion University
- Known for: Affirmative action, social stratification
- Scientific career
- Fields: Sociology
- Workplaces: Tel Aviv University

Sigal Alon is an Israeli sociologist and professor in the Department of Sociology and Anthropology at Tel Aviv University. She led the B. I. Cohen Institute for Public Opinion Research and holds the Weinberg Chair in Social Stratification and Inequality.

== Education ==
Alon earned a bachelor's degree with honors in behavioral sciences from Ben-Gurion University of the Negev in 1987, a master's degree in labor studies from Tel Aviv University in 1991, and a doctorate in sociology from Tel Aviv University in 1998. Her doctoral dissertation examined gender and occupational matching in the labor market.

== Academic career ==
After a post-doc tenure at Princeton University, Alon joined the faculty of Tel Aviv University's Department of Sociology and Anthropology in 2002. She was promoted to senior lecturer in 2007, associate professor in 2011, and full professor in 2016. She became head of the B. I. Cohen Institute for Public Opinion Research in 2017 and was appointed to the Weinberg Chair in Social Stratification and Inequality in 2022.

== Research ==
Alon's research addresses social stratification and inequality, the sociology of education, higher education, work and labor markets, and quantitative methods. Her scholarship examines socioeconomic, gender, and racial and ethnic inequalities in education and employment, as well as the role of public policy in reducing such disparities. Her work uses comparative and interdisciplinary approaches drawing on sociology, economics, demography, and psychology. Alon has published in international academic journals and has served on journal editorial boards. She has also written for The New York Times. During proceedings before the U.S. Supreme Court concerning affirmative action in higher education, she served as an advisor to the Biden administration.

== Books ==
- Alon, S. (2015). Race, Class, and Affirmative Action. Russell Sage Foundation.

== publications ==
Professor Alon has published over 30 papers in top-tier professional journals.
