= Omar Lizardo =

American sociologist (born 1974)

- Born: Omar Alcides Lizardo; September 7, 1974 (age 51); New York City, New York, United States
- Education: Brooklyn College; University of Arizona
- Known for: cultural sociology, cognitive sociology, organizational sociology, social network analysis, social theory
- Awards: Lewis A. Coser Award, Charles Tilly Award, Clifford Geertz Award
- Scientific career
- Fields: Sociology
- Workplaces: University of Arizona, University of Notre Dame, University of California, Los Angeles
- Doctoral advisor: Ronald Breiger
- Other academic advisors: Albert Bergesen, Kieran Healy, Erin Leahey

Omar Lizardo (born 7 September 1974) is an American sociologist who is LeRoy Neiman Term Chair Professor of Sociology at the University of California, Los Angeles. He was previously professor of sociology at the University of Notre Dame (2006–2018), and co-editor of the American Sociological Review. In 2020, Lizardo became a member of the board of reviewing editors of the journal Science. He has also served on the editorial board of the journals Social Forces, Sociological Forum, Poetics, Journal for the Theory of Social Behaviour, Theory and Society, Sociological Theory, and Journal of World-Systems Research.

The website Academic Influence ranks Lizardo as the most influential sociologist from the period 2010–2020. According to one commentator, he "has a history of grappling with important ideas in an innovative and insightful fashion". Lizardo is a widely published and cited author in numerous sub-fields of sociology. He is known for his work at the intersection of cognitive science and sociology of culture, social networks, organizational studies, and sociological theory.

== Biography ==
Lizardo was born in New York City, but spent most of his childhood and teenage years in La Romana, Dominican Republic. He graduated from Brooklyn College, CUNY with a B.S. in Psychology in 1997. He received a MA in 2002 and PhD in 2006 from the University of Arizona both in sociology. He completed his dissertation under the supervision of Ronald Breiger, Kieran Healy, and Erin Leahey, titled Globalization, World Culture And The Sociology Of Taste: Patterns Of Cultural Choice In Cross-National Perspective. Lizardo also co-authored several articles with Albert Bergesen while at Arizona. In 2006, he started as an assistant professor of sociology at the University of Notre Dame in South Bend, Indiana. While at Notre Dame, he was promoted to the rank of associate professor in 2012, and to the rank of full professor in 2016. In 2018, he moved to Los Angeles, to occupy his current post at UCLA.

== Affiliations ==
During his time as a professor of sociology at Notre Dame, he was an External Member of the Centre for the Critical Study of Global Power and Politics at Trent University. He has also served as a faculty fellow at Notre Dame's Kroc Institute for International Peace Studies, the Nanovic Institute for European Studies, and was also a faculty member of iCeNSA, the Interdisciplinary Center for Network Science and Applications at Notre Dame, now renamed the Center for Network & Data Science.

== Projects ==
Lizardo has been involved in various multidisciplinary data analysis and data collection projects, including the NSF-funded NetSense data-collection project and the NIH-funded NetHealth data-collection project.

...I have recently realized, looking at my research trajectory, that it is essentially purely a function of what I’m teaching at the moment and the collaborations I have going. (2024)

== Writing ==
Lizardo has been involved in four major book projects. In 2019, with Elliot Weininger and Annette Lareau, he co-edited the book Ritual, Emotion, Violence: Studies on the Micro-Sociology of Randall Collins, published by Routledge. The volume features contributions from a wide range of social scientists whose work has been inspired by or seeks to extend the theories of the sociologist Randall Collins. Lizardo co-drafted the introduction to the volume with Weininger in which they summarized the intellectual development of Randall Collins's work. In 2020 Lizardo was part of the multiauthor collective that resulted in the book Measuring Culture, published by Columbia University Press. The book covers the history and state of the art of how sociologists think about measuring culture across a wide range of distinct methodological and theoretical traditions. The book has been well-received as a strong and likely influential contribution to the field. In 2021, with Seth Abrutyn he co-edited the Handbook of Classical Sociological Theory published by Springer. This is a collection of essays designed to update and re-orient the status of classical theory in contemporary sociology. Most recently, he is co-authoring a book with Brandeis University sociologist Michael Strand on the role of probabilism in Social Theory as it influenced the sociologies of Max Weber and Pierre Bourdieu and how it can be recovered to prosecute social theory and social analysis more generally today. The book, tentatively titled "Orienting to Chance," is under contract at The University of Chicago Press and slated for publication in the summer of 2025.

== Awards and recognitions ==
In 2005, as a graduate student at the University of Arizona he won two ASA section awards with co-author Jessica Collett. First, the best Graduate Student Paper Award from the section on the Sociology of Religion for their paper Why biology is not (religious) destiny: a second look at gender differences in religiosity (a revised version of the paper was later published in the Journal for the Scientific Study of Religion under a different title). The second was the Best Graduate Student Paper Award from the section on the Sociology of Emotions for their paper Socioeconomic status and the experience of anger. (a revised version of that paper was later published in the journal Social Forces under a slightly different title).

In 2008, he won the Clifford Geertz Prize for Best Article from the ASA's section on the Cultural Sociology for a paper entitled How cultural tastes shape social networks, previously published in American Sociological Review. In this article, Lizardo confronts the "traditional network model" in which cultural taste formation and transmission is shaped and determined by social networks and instead asks "whether cultural tastes and practices themselves have an independent effect on social structure (conceived as patterns of network relations)." He concludes that "popular culture" is characterized by wide appeal and ease of incorporation and is therefore associated with more weak ties (e.g., used as bridges), while "highbrow culture" is more exclusive and serves to strengthen close ties (e.g., used as fences).

In 2013, Lizardo won the Lewis Coser Award for Theoretical Agenda Setting, which is "intended to recognize a mid-career sociologist whose work holds great promise for setting the agenda in the field of sociology.” The next year Lizardo delivered the Lewis Coser Lecture at the 2014 meetings of the American Sociological Association in San Francisco. An abridged and edited version of the lecture was subsequently published as an online pamphlet by Alison Gerber.

In 2014, with co-author Robert Fishman, Lizardo won the Charles Tilly Best Article Award of the ASA's Section on Comparative and Historical Sociology for their paper How macro-historical change shapes cultural taste: Legacies of democratization in Spain and Portugal, previously published in American Sociological Review.

In 2015, along with co-author Jessica Collett, Lizardo received an honorable mention for the ASA's Section on Sociology of Emotions Recent Contribution Award for their paper Embarrassment and social organization: A multiple identities model, previously published in Social Forces

In 2017, along with co-author Michael Strand, Lizardo received an honorable mention for the ASA's Section on Theory Prize for Outstanding Article for their paper Beyond world images: Belief as embodied action in the world, previously published in Sociological Theory.,

In 2018, Lizardo was elected chair of the ASA's section on the Sociology of Culture. In 2019, Lizardo was elected a member of the Sociological Research Association.
