= Brian Uzzi =

American sociologist and network scientist

Brian D. Uzzi
- Education: State University of New York at Stony Brook (PhD); Carnegie Mellon University (MS); Hofstra University (BA)
- Scientific career
- Fields: Sociology; Network Science; Science of Science; Complex Systems
- Workplaces: Northwestern University
- Thesis: The Dynamics of Organizational Networks: Structural Embeddedness and Economic Behavior (1993)
- Doctoral advisors: Mark Granovetter; Michael Schwartz; Frank Romo
- Website: www.kellogg.northwestern.edu/faculty/uzzi/

Brian Dondiego Uzzi is an American sociologist and the Richard L. Thomas Professor of Leadership at the Kellogg School of Management, Northwestern University. He is known for his work on problems in the fields of sociology, network science, the science of science, and complex systems. He is the co-director of both the Northwestern Institute on Complex Systems (NICO) and The Ryan Institute on Complexity, is a professor of sociology, and a professor of Industrial Engineering and Management Sciences at the McCormick School of Engineering. Since 2019, Uzzi has written a column for Forbes on Leadership and artificial intelligence.

== Awards ==
Uzzi has received over 30 scientific research and teaching prizes in the fields of sociology, management, ecology, network science, and computer science. He was inducted as a Fellow of the Network Science Society in 2020 and in 2022, received the Euler Award from the Network Science Society for his foundational theoretical and empirical contributions to the study of embeddedness in networks. In 2025. he was elected to the American Academy of Arts and Sciences.

== Career ==
Uzzi received his BA from Hofstra University, a MS from Carnegie Mellon University, and a PhD in sociology from State University of New York at Stony Brook in 1994. Mark Granovetter, Michael Schwartz, and Frank Romo were his PhD advisors.

Uzzi joined the Kellogg School of Management in 1993. In 2008, he became the co-director of the Northwestern Institute on Complex Systems (NICO), an interdisciplinary research institute whose mission is to serve as a hub for research on complexity and data science that transcends the boundaries of established disciplines. Over his career, he has also been on or visited the faculties of INSEAD, University of Chicago, Harvard University, and the University of California Berkeley. Before entering academia, Uzzi worked as a musician in the New York City area where he grew up and his grandparents settled after immigrating from Italy to the US.

== Research ==
Uzzi is known for his work on social embeddedness, the science of science, and inequality. In the 1990s, he published two empirical papers focusing on the concept of embeddedness. His 1996 paper in the American Sociological Review examines how socially embedded networks of economic relationships impact the economic performance of organizations. His 1997 article in Administrative Science Quarterly pinpoints the paradox of embeddedness in interfirm networks. These two articles have been cited over 21,000 times. His research in this area also addresses diverse problems including competition and cooperation in ecological networks (Nature 2009, 2011), human creativity (AJS 2005), network collapse (PNAS 2008), network dysfunctions under stress (WWW 2016), communication and influence networks (PNAS 2011; Nature Communications 2019), and the causes of women's success in achieving positions of executive leadership (PNAS 2019).

Uzzi has contributed to the Science of Science field with a focus on understanding how scientific structures and practices shape innovation, science, and scientists' careers. In a series of papers, he and colleagues investigated how the mechanisms by which teams self-assemble determine their performance and the topography of the larger network within which these teams are embedded (Science 2005), team science and innovation (Science 2007), multi-university collaborations and stratification in science (Science 2008), and how past scientific knowledge is effectively recombined to create innovative ideas (Science 2013). This work is summarized in part in his TedX talk (2012), "Teaming Up to Drive Scientific Discovery", a 2015 National Research Council book Enhancing the Effectiveness of Team Science, and a 2018 review article (Science 2018).

Uzzi and his collaborators have also examined gender inequality in the workplace. His book, Athena Unbound (Cambridge 2000) and a 1994 Science article studied the link between women scientists' careers, the leaky pipeline, and critical mass dynamics. A 2019 Nature paper looked at gender disparities in scientific prizes, examining biomedical awards over five decades. This was followed by a paper examining the differences in NIH grants awarded to first-time male and female principal investigators (JAMA, 2019), and a 2022 PNAS paper found that gender-diverse teams produce more novel and higher-impact scientific ideas than all-men or all-women teams. Related publications have examined mentorship, retractions, replication failure, knowledge hotspots, and AI-human partnerships.

== Selected publications ==
=== Books ===
- National Research Council, Committee on the Science of Team Science, Nancy J. Cooke and Margaret L. Hilton (Eds). 2015. Enhancing the Effectiveness of Team Science. As a member of the National Research Council Committee on the Science of Team Science, co-authored a report along with Nancy J. Cooke (chair), Roger D. Blandford, Jonathon N. Cummings, Stephen M. Fiore, Kara L. Hall, James S. Jackson, John L. King, Steven W. J. Kozlowski, Judith S. Olson, Jeremy A. Sabloff, Daniel S. Stokols, and Hannah Valantine.
- Etzkowitz, Henry, Carol Kemelgor, and Brian Uzzi. Athena Unbound: The Advancement of Women in Science and Technology. Cambridge University Press, 2000.

=== Articles ===
- Yang Yang, Tanya Y. Tian, Teresa Woodruff, Benjamin Jones and Brian Uzzi. 2022. "Gender-diverse teams produce more novel and higher-impact scientific ideas", Proceedings of the National Academy of Sciences (PNAS), August 2022
- Diego F.M. Oliveira, Yifang Ma, Teresa Woodruff, and Brian Uzzi. 2019 "National Institutes of Health Grant Amounts to First-time Male and Female Principal Investigators". Journal of the American Medical Association (JAMA), 5 March 2019
- Yifang Ma, Diego F.M. Oliveira, Teresa Woodruff, and Brian Uzzi. 2019. "Women who win prizes get less money and prestige". Nature, 16 January 2019
- Yang Yang, Nitesh Chawla, and Brian Uzzi. 2019. "A network's gender composition and communication pattern predict women's leadership success", Proceedings of the National Academy of Sciences (PNAS), 22 January 2019
- Omid Askarisichani, Jacqueline Ng Lane, Francesco Bullo, Noah E. Friedkin, Ambuj K. Singh and Brian Uzzi. 2019. "Structural balance emerges and explains performance in risky decision-making", Nature Communications, 14 June 2019
- Pierre Azoulay, Joshua Graff-Zivin, Brian Uzzi, Dashun Wang, Heidi Williams, James A. Evans, Ginger Zhe Jin, Susan Feng Lu, Benjamin Jones, Katy Börner, Karim R. Lakhani, Kevin J. Boudreau, Eva C. Guinan. 2018. "Toward a more scientific science", Science 361, September 2018
- Daniel M. Romero, Brian Uzzi and Jon Kleinberg. 2016. "Social Networks Under Stress", WWW '16: Proceedings of the 25th International Conference on World Wide Web, April 2016, Pages 9–20
- Brian Uzzi, Satyam Mukerjee, Michael Stringer, and Benjamin Jones. 2013. "Atypical Combinations and Scientific Impact". Science, 342, 268–472.
- Serguei Saavedra, Kathleen Hagerty, and Brian Uzzi. 2011. "Synchronicity, instant messaging, and performance among financial traders", Proceeding of the National Academy of Sciences (PNAS), 1018462108v1-201018462
- Serguei Saavedra, Daniel Stouffer, Brian Uzzi, and Jordi Bascompte. 2011. "Strong Contributors to network persistence are most vulnerable to extinction". Nature, 478, 233–235
- Serguei Saavedra, Felix Reed-Tsochas, and Brian Uzzi. 2009. "A simple model of bipartite cooperation for ecological and organizational networks", Nature, 457:463–466
- Serguei Saavedra, Felix Reed-Tsochas, and Brian Uzzi. 2008. "Asymmetric disassembly and robustness in declining networks", Proceedings of the National Academy of Sciences (PNAS), 105:16466–16471
- Benjamin Jones, Stefan Wuchty, and Brian Uzzi. 2008. "Multi-university Research Teams: Shifting Impact, Geography, and Stratification in Science", Science, 322, 1259–1263.
- Stefan Wuchty, Benjamin Jones, and Brian Uzzi. 2007. "The Increasing Dominance of Teams in the Production of Knowledge", Science, May 2007, 316:1036–1039
- Roger Guimera, Brian Uzzi, Jarrett Spiro, and Luis Amaral. 2005. "Team Assembly Mechanisms Determine Collaboration Network Structure and Team Performance", Science, 308:697–702
- Brian Uzzi and Jarrett Spiro. 2005. "Collaboration and Creativity: The Small World Problem", American Journal of Sociology (AJS), 111:447–504
- Brian Uzzi. 1997. "Social Structure and Competition in Interfirm Networks: The Paradox of Embeddedness", Administrative Science Quarterly (ASQ), March, 42:35–67
- Brian Uzzi. 1996. "The Sources and Consequences of Embeddedness for the Economic Performance of Organizations: The Network Effect". American Sociological Review (ASR), v61(4): 674–698
- Henry Etzkowitz, Carol Kemelgor, Brian Uzzi and Mike Neuschatz. 1994. "The Paradox of Critical Mass for Women in Science", Science, 226:51–55
