= Organizational intelligence =

Capability of an organization to comprehend and create knowledge relevant to its purpose

Organizational intelligence (OI) is the capability of an organization to comprehend and create knowledge relevant to its purpose, equating to the intellectual capacity of the entire organization. Relevant organizational intelligence enables potential for companies and organizations to identify their strengths and weaknesses lie in responding to change and complexity.

== Overview ==
Organizational intelligence embraces both knowledge management and organizational learning, as it is the application of knowledge management concepts to a business environment. These concepts include learning mechanisms, comprehension models, and business value network models, such as the balanced scorecard concept. Organizational intelligence consists of the ability to make sense of complex situations and act effectively, to interpret and act upon relevant events and signals in the environment. It also includes the ability to develop, share and use knowledge relevant to its business purpose as well as the ability to reflect and learn from experience

While organizations in the past have been viewed as compilations of tasks, products, employees, profit centers, and processes, today they are seen as intelligent systems that are designed to manage knowledge. Scholars have shown that organizations engage in learning processes using tacit forms of intuitive knowledge, hard data stored in computer networks and information gleaned from the environment, all of which are used to make sensible decisions. Because this complex process involves large numbers of people interacting with diverse information systems, organizational intelligence is more than the aggregate intelligence of organizational members; it is the intelligence of the organization itself as a larger system.

== Organizational intelligence vs operational intelligence ==
Organizational intelligence and operational intelligence are usually seen as subsets of business analytics, since both are types of know-how that have the goal of improving business performance across the enterprise. Operational intelligence is often linked to or compared with real-time business intelligence (BI) since both deliver visibility and insight into business operations. Operational intelligence differs from BI in being primarily activity-centric, whereas BI is primarily data-centric and relies on a database (or Hadoop cluster) as well as after-the-fact and report-based approaches to identifying patterns in data. By definition, operational intelligence works in real-time and transforms unstructured data streams—from log files, sensor, network, and service data—into real-time, actionable intelligence.

While operational intelligence is activity-focused and BI is data-focused, organizational intelligence differs from these other approaches in being workforce- or organization-focused. Organizational intelligence helps companies understand the relationships that drive their business—by identifying communities as well as employee workflow and collaborative communications patterns across geographies, divisions, and internal and external organizations.

== Information process ==
There are many aspects that organizations must consider in the three steps that they take to gain information. Without these considerations, organizations may experience strategic challenges.

=== Acquiring information ===
Organizations must acquire applicable information to make beneficial predictions. An organization must understand what they already know and need to know, they must also know the timeframe in which the information is needed and where and to find it. They must also evaluate the value of the information, as the process of searching for seemingly valuable but elusive information can hurt the company financially. If judged valuable, the organization must find the most efficient means of acquiring it.

=== Processing information ===
After acquiring the right information, an organization must know how to properly process it. They need to know how they can make new information more retrievable and how they can make sure that the information gets disseminated to the right people. The organization must figure out how to secure it and how long and if long, how they need to preserve it.

=== Utilization of information ===
The last step includes the utilization of the information. An organization should ask themselves if they are looking at the right information and if so, if they are placing them in the right context. They must consider the possible environmental changes alter the informational value and determine all the relevant connections and patterns. Not forgetting to know if they are including the right people in the decision making process and if there are any technology that can improve the decision making.

== Organizational ignorance ==
There are briefly four dimensions of problems that many organizations face when dealing with information. This is also referred to as organizational ignorance.

=== Uncertainty ===
An organization may be uncertain when it does not possess enough or the right information. To exemplify, a company may be uncertain in a competitive landscape because it does not have enough information to see how the competitors will act. This does not imply that the context of the situation is complex or unclear. Uncertainty can even exist when the range of possibilities is small and simple. There are different degrees of uncertainty. First of all an organization can be completely determined (complete certainty), have some probabilities (risk), probabilities estimated with lesser confidence (subjective uncertainty), unknown probabilities (traditional uncertainty) or undefined (complete uncertainty). However even with the lack of clarity, uncertainty assumes that the context of the problem is clear and well understood.

=== Complexity ===
An organization may be processing more information than they can manage. Complexity doesn't always correlate with vagueness or unpredictability. Rather, it occurs when there are too much or when the scope is too large to process. Organizations with complexity problems have interrelated variables, solutions and methods. Managing these problems is dependent of the individuals and the organizations. For instance, uninformed and novices must deal with each elements and relationships one by one but experts can perceive the situation better and find familiar patterns more easily. Organizations facing complexity must have the capacity to locate, map, collect, share, exploit on what the organizations need to know.

=== Ambiguity ===
An organization may not have a conceptual framework for interpreting the information. If uncertainty represents not having answers, and complexity represents difficulty in finding them, ambiguity represents not being able to formulate the right questions. Ambiguity cannot be resolved by increasing the amount of information. An organization must be able to interpret and explain the information in collective agreement. Hypotheses should be continuously made and discussed and key communication activities such as face-to-face conversations must be made. Resolving ambiguity in the earlier stages than competitors gives organizations much advantage because it helps organizations to make more appropriate and strategic decisions and have better awareness.

=== Equivocality ===
An organization may be having competing frameworks for interpreting a job. Equivocality refers to multiple interpretations of the field. Each interpretation is unambiguous but differ from each other and they may be mutually exclusive or in conflict. Equivocality result not only because everyone's experiences and values are unique but also from unreliable or conflicting preferences and goals, different interests or vague roles and responsibilities.

== Information organization and culture ==
A culture of the organization describes how the organization will work in order to succeed. It can simply be described as the organization's atmosphere or values. Organizational culture is important because it can be used as a successful leadership tool to shape and improve the organization. Once the culture is settled, it can be used by the leader to deliver his/her vision to the organization. Moreover, if the leader deeply understands the organizational culture, he/she can also use it to predict a future outcome in certain situations.

=== Control ===
An organization with control culture is company oriented and reality oriented. They will succeed by controlling and keeping restrictions. The organization will value timeliness of information, security and hierarchical standardization. They make plans and maintain a process. This organization has stability, predictability and authority. For example, an organization with control culture can be monarchy.

=== Competence ===
An organization with competence culture is company oriented and possibility oriented. They will succeed by being the best with exclusivity of the information. The organization values efficiency, accuracy and achievement. They look for creativity and expertise from the people in the organization. For example, an organization with competence culture can be...

=== Cultivation ===
An organization with cultivation culture is people oriented and possibility oriented. They will succeed by growing people, who fulfill the shared vision. The organization values self-actualization and brilliance. They also prioritizes the idea from people. For example, an organization with cultivation culture can be technological utopianism.

=== Collaboration ===
An organization with collaboration culture is people oriented and reality oriented. They will succeed by working together. The organization values affiliation and teamwork. They also prioritizes people in the organization. This organization has accessibility and inclusiveness of information. For example, an organization with collaboration culture can be anarchy.

=== Innovation ===
An organization's leadership effectiveness is closely related to the organization's intelligence and innovation. There are six leadership factors that determine an organization's atmosphere: flexibility (how freely people can communicate with each other and innovate), responsibility (sense of loyalty to the organization), the standards set by people in the organization, appropriate feedback and rewards, the clear vision shared by people and the amount of commitment to the goal. Combination of these factors result in six different leadership styles: Coercive/Commanding, Authoritative/Visionary, Affiliative, Democratic, Coaching and Pacesetting.

Furthermore, organizational intelligence is a collection of individual intelligence. The leadership style of the organization and its atmosphere are related to the organization's innovation. Innovation happens when there are new information getting shared and processed efficiently in the organization.

== Theories ==
=== Round table ===
In King Arthur's Round Table, Harvard professor David Perkins uses the metaphor of the Round Table to discuss how collaborative conversations create smarter organizations. The Round Table is one of the most familiar stories of Arthurian legend since it's meant to signal the shift in power from a king who normally sat at the head of a long table and made long pronouncements while everyone else listened. By reducing hierarchy and making collaboration easier, Arthur discovered an important source of power—organizational intelligence—that allowed him to unite medieval England.

=== Lawnmower paradox ===
The lawnmower paradox, another metaphor from Perkins' book, describes the fact that, while pooling physical effort is easy, pooling mental effort is hard. "It's a lot easier for 10 people to collaborate on mowing a large lawn than for 10 people to collaborate on designing a lawnmower." An organization's intelligence is reflected by the types of conversations—face-to-face and electronic, from the mailroom to the boardroom—which members have with one another. "At the top, top level, organizational intelligence depends on ways of interacting with one another that show good knowledge processing and positive symbolic conduct."

Harold Wilensky argued that organizational intelligence benefited from healthy argument and constructive rivalry.

== See also ==
- Knowledge management
- Competence (human resources)
- Talent management
- Modes of Leadership
- Organizational culture
