= Paul F. Lazarsfeld Award =

The Paul F. Lazarsfeld Award is a lifetime achievement award presented by the American Sociological Association for methodological developments for the sociological science. It is named after the founder of quantitative sociology, Paul Lazarsfeld. It is established in 1986 and is awarded annually to one or two individuals.

== Past recipients ==
A list of past recipients of the award.

- 1986 Robert M. Hauser
- 1987 Clifford Clogg
- 1989 Leslie Kish
- 1990 Nathan Keyfitz
- 1991 Hubert M. Blalock Jr.
- 1994 Nancy Brandon Tuma
- 1995 Peter H. Rossi
- 1996 Howard Schuman
- 1997 Kenneth Land
- 1998 Richard Berk
- 1999 Robert D. Mare
- 2000 Kenneth A. Bollen
- 2001 Paul D. Allison
- 2002 J. Scott Long
- 2003 Adrian Raftery
- 2005 William M. Mason
- 2006 Christopher Winship
- 2007 Stanley Lieberson and Arthur Stinchcombe
- 2008 Arthur Stinchcombe
- 2010 Leo Goodman
- 2011 Ross M. Stolzenberg
- 2012 Stanley Presser
- 2013 Robert M. Groves
- 2014 Charles Ragin
- 2015 Guillermina Jasso
- 2016 Don Dillman and Peter Marsden
- 2017 David Heise
- 2018 Glenn Firebaugh
- 2019 Yu Xie
- 2020 Ronald Breiger
- 2021 Tim F. Liao
- 2022 Tom A.B. Snijders
- 2023 Duane Alwin
- 2024 Stephen Raudenbush
- 2025 Kazuo Yamaguchi
- 2026 Kenneth Frank
