= Daniel M. Romero =

Colombian-American computer scientist

- Education: Arizona State University (BS); Cornell University (PhD)
- Known for: Network analysis Social media analysis Information diffusion modeling
- Scientific career
- Fields: Computer Science; Computational Social Science; Network Science; Complex Systems; Social Media
- Workplaces: University of Michigan; Northwestern University
- Thesis: Dynamics Of Social Network Evolution And Information Diffusion (2012)
- Doctoral advisor: Jon Kleinberg
- Website: dromero.org

Daniel M. Romero is a Colombian-American computer scientist and associate professor in the University of Michigan School of Information and the Center for Study of Complex Systems. He is known for his work on social networks and information diffusion.

== Early life and education ==
Daniel M. Romero was born in Bogotá, Colombia. He received a B.S. in Mathematics Magna Cum Laude at Arizona State University in 2006 and a Ph.D. in Applied Mathematics from Cornell University in 2012.

== Career and research ==
Romero was a postdoctoral fellow at the Northwestern Institute for Complex Systems (NICO) at Northwestern University from 2012 to 2013. He joined the School of Information faculty at the University of Michigan in 2014, where he is currently an associate professor. Romero is also appointed within the University of Michigan College of Engineering and the Center for the Study of Complex Systems.

Romero's work focuses on the study of the evolution of social and information networks and the diffusion of information in social media. His work has been covered by the media including the New York Times, the Wall Street Journal, The Economist, The New Scientist, among others. His research has been cited over 5,000 times according to Google Scholar. His article on the impact of exogenous shocks on the structure of social networks won Best Paper award at The Web Conference in 2016. He has received awards from the National Science Foundation (NSF) as well as the AFOSR Young Investigator award.

In 2025, Romero co-authored a study published in the *Proceedings of the National Academy of Sciences* that examined the impact of interdisciplinarity on academic journal acceptance rates. Analyzing 128,950 submissions across STEM fields, the study found that knowledge-base interdisciplinarity was associated with a 0.9 percentage point increase in acceptance rates, while topic interdisciplinarity led to a 1.2 percentage point decrease. However, the negative effect of topic interdisciplinarity diminished when paired with a broad knowledge base.

== Selected works ==
- Satyam Mukherjee, Daniel M. Romero, Ben Jones, and Brian Uzzi, (2017), "The Nearly Universal Link Between the Age of Past Knowledge and Tomorrow's Breakthroughs in Science and Technology: The Hotspot." Science advances 3, no. 4: e1601315.
- Daniel M. Romero, Brian Uzzi, and Jon Kleinberg, (2016), "Social Networks Under Stress." In Proceedings of the 25th International Conference on World Wide Web (pp. 9–20).
- Daniel M. Romero, Roderick I. Swaab, Brian Uzzi, and Adam Galinsky, (2015), "Mimicry is Presidential: Linguistic Style Matching in Presidential Debates and Improved Polling Numbers." Personality and Social Psychology Bulletin 41, no. 10: 1311-1319.
- Daniel M. Romero, Brendan Meeder, and Jon Kleinberg, (2011), "Differences in the Mechanics of Information Diffusion Across Topics: Idioms, Political Hashtags, and Complex Contagion on Twitter." In Proceedings of the 20th international conference on World wide web (pp. 695–704).
- Bernardo Huberman, Daniel M. Romero, and Fang Wu, (2009), "Social Networks That Matter: Twitter Under the Microscope." First Monday.
- Aparna Ananthasubramaniam, Yufei 'Louise' Zhu, David Jurgens, and Daniel M. Romero. (2025). "Evaluating interdisciplinary research: Disparate outcomes for topic and knowledge base." Proceedings of the National Academy of Sciences, 122(16), e2318147122.
- Abraham Israeli, David Jurgens, and Daniel M. Romero. (2024). "A Test of Time: Predicting the Sustainable Success of Online Collaboration in Wikipedia." arXiv preprint.
