= Marion J. Levy Jr. =

American sociologist

- Born: December 12, 1918; Galveston, Texas, US
- Died: May 26, 2002 (aged 83); Princeton, New Jersey, US
- Education: Harvard University
- Scientific career
- Fields: Sociology
- Workplaces: Princeton University
- Doctoral advisor: Talcott Parsons
- Doctoral students: David Apter; Harrison White

Marion Joseph Levy Jr. (December 12, 1918 – May 26, 2002) was an American sociologist noted for his work on modernization theory.

Born in Galveston, Texas, Levy received his doctorate in sociology from Harvard, studying under Talcott Parsons. Levy was hired at Princeton in 1947. He served as Musgrave Professor of Sociology and International Affairs until retirement in 1989. he died in Princeton New Jersey in 2002 of Parkinson's disease at age 83.

Levy was an advocate of structural-functionalism in sociology. His two-volume Modernization and the Structure of Societies was a systematic statement of modernization theory. Levy also produced analytic works on Chinese and Japanese history.

Levy was perhaps best known outside academia for an extremely short book, Levy's Laws of the Disillusionment of the True Liberal. The cynical "laws", originally numbering six and ultimately totaling 11, became a commonly quoted source of condensed sociopolitical wisdom.
