= Randall Collins =

American sociologist (born 1941)

- Born: July 29, 1941 (age 85); Knoxville, Tennessee, U.S.
- Education: University of California, Berkeley; Stanford University; Harvard University
- Scientific career
- Fields: Sociology
- Workplaces: University of Pennsylvania
- Website: www.sociological-eye.blogspot.com

Randall Collins (born July 29, 1941) is an American sociologist who has been influential in both his teaching and writing. He has taught in many notable universities around the world and his academic works have been translated into various languages. Collins is currently the Dorothy Swaine Thomas Professor of Sociology, emeritus at the University of Pennsylvania. He is a leading contemporary social theorist whose areas of expertise include the macro-historical sociology of political and economic change; micro-sociology, including face-to-face interaction; and the sociology of intellectuals and social conflict. Collins's publications include The Sociology of Philosophies: A Global Theory of Intellectual Change (1998), which analyzes the network of philosophers and mathematicians for over two thousand years in both Asian and Western societies. His current research involves macro patterns of violence including contemporary war, as well as solutions to police violence. He is considered to be one of the leading non-Marxist conflict theorists in the United States, and served as the president of the American Sociological Association from 2010 to 2011.

== Early life and education ==
Collins grew up in various cities and spent a good deal of his early years in Europe, where his father was part of military intelligence during World War II and also served in the United States Department of State. They both lived in Germany immediately following World War II, and later in Moscow. Collins attended a New England prep school. Afterward, he completed a B.A. in psychology at Harvard University, where he was taught by notable sociologist Talcott Parsons. He subsequently earned an M.A. in the discipline from Stanford University (1964) before completing an M.A. and Ph.D. in sociology at the University of California, Berkeley (1969). Although he did not agree with Parsons's socially conservative methodology, he respected the prestige of being a theorist and emulated this in his later years. Collins wanted to study personality and human cognition but was assigned to work in a rat lab as a research assistant; this made him realize he would rather study sociology.

During his time at Berkeley, Collins was involved with campus protests, the Free Speech Movement and the anti-war movement. On December 3, 1964, Collins was arrested during a stand-in for the Free Speech Movement along with over 600 of his peers.

While at Berkeley, Collins encountered many influential sociologists of his day, including Herbert Blumer, Philip Selznick and Leo Löwenthal. He worked with Joseph Ben-David, an Israeli sociologist visiting from Hebrew University, on the sociology of science, which ultimately led to Collins' publication The Sociology of Philosophies decades later. Collins was introduced to Weberian conflict theory through Reinhard Bendix, a leading Max Weber scholar. Of his early career, Collins would later say "I was part of the generation of young sociologists who broke with functionalist theory and moved toward conflict theory." He later wrote a chapter for Bendix's work State and Society. This work enabled Collins to later combine this theory with Erving Goffman's microsociology, which resulted in Collins' publication Conflict Sociology in 1975 and later, Interaction Ritual Chains in 2004. Goffman was also one of Collins' professors during his time at Berkeley.

Collins' dissertation advisor was organizational and industrial sociologist Harold Wilensky. It was titled Education and Employment: Some Determinants of Requirements for Hiring in Various Types of Organizations, and it was later published in 1979 as The Credential Society: A Historical Sociology of Education and Stratification. The monograph analyzed organizational data to show that rising educational requirements for employment were not due to technologically driven demand for skills, but to changing standards of cultural respectability.

== Career ==
Collins first taught as an acting instructor at Berkeley (1967–1968). He subsequently served on the faculties of University of Wisconsin-Madison (instructor; 1968–1969), the University of California, San Diego (assistant and associate professor; 1969–1977), the University of Virginia (professor; 1978–1982) and the University of California, Riverside (professor; 1985–1997) before taking his current position at the University of Pennsylvania. He took intermittent breaks from academia (1977–1978; 1982–1985) as an independent scholar and novelist. He has also held visiting appointments at the University of Chicago (1985), Harvard University (1994) and the University of Cambridge (2000–2001), as well as various schools in Europe, Japan and China. In the Fall of 1989, Collins was a Fellow at the Swedish Collegium for Advanced Study in Uppsala, Sweden. Collins has published almost one hundred articles since finishing his undergraduate education. He has also written and contributed to several books with a range of topics such as the discovery of society to the sociology of marriage and family life.

In honor of Collins' retirement from the field, the University of Pennsylvania hosted "Social Interaction and Theory: A Conference in Honor of Professor Randall Collins." Leading scholars in sociology contributed talks, including Elijah Anderson, Paul DiMaggio, David R. Gibson, Michèle Lamont, Jonathan Turner, and Viviana Zelizer.

== Collins on credential inflation ==
Collins has written extensively about credential inflation, proposing a set of mechanisms through which it operates.

As Collins points out, even the existence of a small number of elite jobs acts in ways to shape the entire system of social mobility competition. In order to meet demand, education has expanded and increased degree production – and the business community has responded to the abundance of credentials by hiring applicants with the most prestigious degrees. This, in turn, has served to increase consumer demand.

The resulting double-spiral is a credential spiral that is moving upward and ever expanding. As more degrees become available through increased production, they cannot all be absorbed by businesses, but demand for credentials promising access to salaried positions continues. Additional advanced degrees and professional certifications emerge to accelerate the expansion, undermining the value of American education, i.e., credential inflation.

== Research ==
Collins is a social scientist who views theory as essential to understanding the world. He says "The essence of science is precisely theory...a generalized and coherent body of ideas, which explain the range of variations in the empirical world in terms of general principles". This is Collins' way of examining the social world, emphasizing the role and interaction of larger social structures. He has devoted much of his career and research to study society, how is it created and destroyed through emotional behaviors of human beings. Collins believes that the simplest explanation for radical behavior and actions is emotion. Emotional energy, Collins says, is the "amount of emotional power that flows through one's actions" and does not refer to one specific emotion. When Collins talks about emotion, he never talks about specific emotions like love, joy, hate, and so forth. The same is true with his interest in culture. In Collins hands, culture becomes symbolic goods that are used in exchange or sacred symbols that unite a group. Collins also emphasizes the significance of people coming together and the influence this has on behavior.

The theory of interaction ritual chains is inspired by Emile Durkheim's theory of ritual, laid forward in his book The Elementary Forms of Religious Life, by the conflict theory of Max Weber, microsociology of Erving Goffman. It has itself inspired various domains across the social sciences, including Management Studies, Creative Tourism, International Relations, and Jeffrey C. Alexander's Cultural Pragmatics. Numerous empirical studies have likewise employed Interaction Ritual Theory, for instance to explore how specific institutions maintain themselves, how websites use interaction ritual chains to form the identity of its users, or how diplomats establish exchange programmes to invite foreign elites into their countries.

== Selected bibliography ==
=== Journal articles ===
- Collins, Randall (March 2013). "Entering and leaving the tunnel of violence: Micro-sociological dynamics of emotional entrainment in violent interactions". Current Sociology. 61 (2): 132–151. doi:10.1177/0011392112456500. S2CID 145781139.

=== Books ===
- 1975/2019 - Conflict Sociology: Toward an Explanatory Science
- 1979 - The Credential Society: An Historical Sociology of Education and Stratification
- 1984 - The Discovery of Society (with Michael Makowsky)
- 1986 – Weberian Sociological Theory
- 1988 – Theoretical Sociology
- 1992 – Sociological Insight: An Introduction to Non-Obvious Sociology 2nd ed.
- 1994 – Four Sociological Traditions
- 1998 – The Sociology of Philosophies: A Global Theory of Intellectual Change
- 1999 – Macrohistory
- 2004 – Interaction Ritual Chains
- 2008 – Violence: A Microsociological Theory
- 2015 – Napoleon Never Slept (with Maren McConnell)
- 2020 - Micro-sociology of Power and Influence

=== Fiction writing ===
Early in his career, Collins left academia on several occasions to write fiction. One of his novels is The Case of the Philosopher's Ring, featuring Sherlock Holmes.
