= Mark Mizruchi =

20th and 21st-century American professor

- Born: Mark Sheldon Mizruchi; December 10, 1953 (age 72)
- Education: Washington University in St. Louis (BA); Stony Brook University (MA, PhD)
- Known for: social network analysis and organizational theory
- Awards: 2011 Guggenheim Foundation Fellow, 1988–1993 National Science Foundation Presidential Young Investigator Award
- Scientific career
- Fields: Sociology
- Institutions: University of Michigan, Columbia University
- Doctoral advisor: Michael Schwartz
- Other academic advisors: Mark Granovetter

Mark Sheldon Mizruchi (born December 10, 1953) is an American sociologist. He is the Robert Cooley Angell Collegiate Professor of Sociology and Barger Family Professor of Organizational Studies at the University of Michigan, where he is also a professor of management and operations at the Ross School of Business.

His research has focused on the political activity of the U.S. corporate elite over the 20th and 21st centuries. He was influential in the development of social network analysis, and has published research in the fields of organizational theory, economic sociology, and political sociology.

== Career ==
Mizruchi received his A.B. from Washington University in St. Louis in 1975 and his M.A. and PhD from the Stony Brook University in 1980, both in sociology. From 1980 to 1987 he was a statistical consultant in the computing center of the Albert Einstein College of Medicine in the Bronx, becoming an assistant professor of psychiatry (biostatistics). In 1987 he moved to Columbia University, first as Assistant and then as associate professor of sociology. In 1991 he moved to the University of Michigan as Professor of Sociology, with a courtesy appointment as Professor of Business Administration. He was named Barger Family Professor in 2012 and Robert Cooley Angell Collegiate Professor of Sociology in 2014.

== Academic work ==
Mizruchi's work has centered on, first, the changing ownership and control of the largest U.S. corporations, and, second, corporate political action. His key theoretical work has been explaining the sources of unity and conflict among U.S. big business. When do firms, modeled as independent agents in most social scientific analysis, collaborate to achieve common goals? This line of research addresses a long-standing question about the nature of the corporation: who controls the corporation when ownership is widely dispersed among shareholders? Can managers act in their own interest, and what forces prevent them from doing so?

To address these questions, Mizruchi has empirically focused on relationships between firms arising from corporate board relationships. Many corporate board members serve on more than one corporate board, creating Interlocking directorates that allow for the diffusion of ideas; Mizruchi has investigated how this interlock network has evolved, and the role that it plays in coordinating action. Not all interlocks, however, are created equal. He shows that through the twentieth century, representatives from financial institutions played a central role in the interlock network. Through these network ties, banks were able to monitor firms' behavior, with significant financial consequences. However, his later work demonstrated recent declines in the centrality of banks. This thesis is expanded in his latest book, which highlights the growing fracturing of the U.S. corporate elite over the past forty years, and suggests broad consequences for the governance of the U.S. economy.

== Books ==
- The Fracturing of the American Corporate Elite, Cambridge: Harvard University Press. (2013); winner of the George R. Terry Book Award from the Academy of Management, and the Distinguished Contribution to Scholarship Award from the Political Sociology Section of the American Sociological Association.
- The Structure of Corporate Political Action: Interfirm Relations and their Consequences, Cambridge: Harvard University Press. (1992).
- The American Corporate Network, 1904–1974, Beverly Hills: Sage Publications. (1982).
- with Michael Schwartz (eds.), Intercorporate Relations: The Structural Analysis of Business, New York: Cambridge University Press. (1987). Volume 1 of the series Structural Analysis in the Social Sciences, edited by Mark Granovetter.

== Fellowships and awards ==
- Charles Horton Cooley Award for Distinguished Scholarship in Sociology, presented by the Michigan Sociological Association, 2016
- Senior Fellow, Michigan Society of Fellows, nominated May 2016 for a four-year term
- Distinguished Contribution to Scholarship Award from the Political Sociology Section of the American Sociological Association, 2014, for The Fracturing of the American Corporate Elite
- George R. Terry Book Award from the Academy of Management, 2014, for The Fracturing of the American Corporate Elite
- John Simon Guggenheim Memorial Foundation Fellowship, 2011–2012
- National Science Foundation Presidential Young Investigator Award, 1988–93
- Invited Fellow (declined), Center for Advanced Study in the Behavioral Sciences, 1989

== Major articles ==
- Berle and Means Revisited: The Governance and Power of Large U.S. Corporations, Theory and Society, 2004, 33:579–617.
- with Gerald F. Davis, The Money Center Cannot Hold: Commercial Banks in the U.S. System of Corporate Governance; Administrative Science Quarterly, 1999, 44:215–239.
- with Lisa C. Fein, The Social Construction of Organizational Knowledge: A Study of the Uses of Coercive, Mimetic, and Normative Isomorphism, Administrative Science Quarterly, 1999, 44:653–683.
- What Do Interlocks Do? An Analysis, Critique, and Assessment of Research on Interlocking Directorates, Annual Review of Sociology, 1996, 22:271–298.
- with Linda Brewster Stearns, Board Composition and Corporate Financing: The Impact of Financial Institution Representation on Borrowing, Academy of Management Journal, 1993, 36:603–618.
- with Linda Brewster Stearns, A Longitudinal Study of the Formation of Interlocking Directorates, Administrative Science Quarterly, 1988, 33:194–210.
- Who Controls Whom?: An Examination of the Relation Between Management and Boards of Directors in Large American Corporations, Academy of Management Review, 1983, 8:426–435.
