= David R. Gibson =

American sociology professor (born 1969)

- Born: 1969 (age 56–57); Philadelphia, Pennsylvania
- Education: Eastern College (B.A.); Columbia University (Ph.D.)
- Known for: conversation analysis, organizational sociology, social network analysis,
- Awards: Melvin Pollner Prize
- Scientific career
- Fields: Sociology
- Workplaces: University of Notre Dame
- Doctoral advisor: Peter Bearman
- Other academic advisors: Harrison White, Randall Collins

David Richard Gibson (born 1969) is an American sociologist and associate professor of sociology at the University of Notre Dame. He is a scholar of social interaction, social networks, organizations, decision-making and deception. In a review article, Eviatar Zerubavel described him "as one of sociology's leading conversational analysts". His publication Talk at the Brink: Deliberation and Decision during the Cuban Missile Crisis won the 2013 Melvin Pollner Prize for Ethnomethodology and Conversation Analysis.

== Career ==
Gibson grew up in Philadelphia received his B.A., magna cum laude, from Eastern College. He then attended Columbia University, where he received his M.A. in 1994, and M.Phil. in 1995, both in sociology. From 1997 to 1999, Gibson was a research associate to Harrison White and Kathryn Neckerman for the project funded by the Citigroup Behavioral Sciences Research Council (chaired by James March) entitled, “Conflict and Cooperation in Work Groups.” He completed a PhD with distinction, in 1999, also from Columbia. Under the supervision of Peter Bearman along with advisors Randall Collins, and Harrison White, he completed his dissertation entitled Taking Turns and Talking Ties: Conversational Sequences in Business Meetings. For his doctoral research, Gibson:

...employ[ed] real-time observational coding of conversational dynamics in various meeting settings in a large corporation yields data amenable to quantitative analysis of (a) the rules underlying conversation (e.g., turn-taking) in group conversations, and (b) the way in which these rules are subverted or exploited by actors negotiating dyadic relationships. Also manipulated are dimensions of formal structure context. This provides a way of integrating the concerns of network analysts with those of ethnomethodologists (Garfinkel) and sociolinguists (Goffman, Schegloff)

— Columbia University webpage, 1999

Funded by a National Science Foundation grant, Gibson joined the Institute for Social and Economic Research and Policy as a post-doctoral fellow under the direction of Harrison White for the project titled: “Dynamics From Social Settings: Representations of Interdependent Social Forms”.

Gibson then accepted a position of assistant professor at Harvard University, where he taught from 2001 to 2005, and then moved to the University of Pennsylvania, also as an assistant professor. He was briefly a lecturer at Princeton University before accepting a position as associate professor of sociology at the University of Notre Dame in 2013.

He has served on the editorial boards of the journals Social Psychology Quarterly (2007–2009) and Sociological Theory (2011–2012).

== Contributions ==
According to Douglas Brinkley, in Gibson's 2012 publication Talk at the Brink: Deliberation and Decision during the Cuban Missile Crisis, "the Cuban missile crisis of October 1962 is reinterpreted in this brilliant, analytic exposé... [and] sheds landmark new light on the terse diplomacy between Kennedy and Khrushchev." Likewise, Jane Mansbridge argues that Talk at the Brink "makes a major intellectual and scholarly contribution to our understanding of human behavior...The book's strongest lesson is how open and nonlinear important decisions can be." The book won the 2013 Melvin Pollner Prize for Ethnomethodology and Conversation Analysis. The book received additional reviews in the American Journal of Sociology by Phaedra Daipha, in The 49th Parallel by Scott Midgley, in Perspectives on Politics by Frank Harvey, and in Social Forces by Erik Schneiderhan. In 2012, Gibson published a summary of this research in Nature, called "Decisions at the Brink."

His research has been covered by The New York Times, NPR, and Business Insider.
