= Kenneth A. Bollen =

American sociologist

- Born: 1951 (age 74–75)
- Awards: Paul F. Lazarsfeld Award (2000)

Academic background
- Education: Drew University; Brown University
- Thesis: Political democracy : a macro-theoretical and empirical analysis (1978)

Academic work
- Discipline: Sociology, Psychometrics
- Institutions: General Motors Research Laboratories; Dartmouth College; University of North Carolina at Chapel Hill
- Website: bollen.web.unc.edu

Kenneth Alan Bollen (born 1951) is the Henry Rudolf Immerwahr Distinguished Professor of Sociology at the University of North Carolina at Chapel Hill. Bollen joined UNC-Chapel Hill in 1985. He is also a member of the faculty in the Quantitative Psychology Program housed in the L. L. Thurstone Psychometric Laboratory. He is a fellow at the Carolina Population Center, the American Statistical Association and the American Association for the Advancement of Science. He was also the Director of the Odum Institute for Research in Social Science from 2000 to 2010. His specialties are population studies and cross-national analyses of democratization.

Bollen is the author of several books and over a hundred papers, which have attracted a very large number of citations over the years. His best known publication, Structural Equations with Latent Variables, has been cited over 32,000 times. It integrated a diverse body of literature from several disciplines, and helped define the area of structural equation modeling (SEM).

According to the National Science Foundation, "His best known substantive research is on the measurement, determinants, and consequences of liberal democracy in nations. The research revealed conservative and liberal biases in democracy measures and provided new measures that minimized the bias. He and colleagues delivered the first empirical estimates of the effects of British colonial history, world system position, and religious traditions on democracy." The National Science Foundation has Bollen on its Advisory Committee for Social, Behavioral & Economic Sciences.

== Education and career ==
Bollen studied sociology and mathematics at Drew University, where he graduated in 1973 with a B.A. He attended graduate school at Brown University, obtaining an M.A. and a Ph.D. in sociology in 1975 and in 1978, respectively. From 1978 to 1982, he was a research scientist at the Social Analysis Department at General Motors Research Laboratories. He joined Dartmouth College as an assistant professor of sociology in 1982 and remained there until 1985, when he moved to University of North Carolina at Chapel Hill and became an associate professor. In 1989, he became a full professor of sociology.

== Honors and awards ==
In 2018, he won a career award of Psychometric society for lifetime achievement.

In 2011, he was an Elected Fellow of the American Statistical Association. For the period 2010–2012, he was Elected Chair, Chair, Past Chair of the Section on Social, Economic, and Political Sciences of the American Association for the Advancement of Science (AAAS). In 2008, he was and Elected Fellow of the American Association for the Advancement of Science.

In 2002, he was added to the ISI Highly Cited database of "highly cited researchers" in the Social Sciences category as well as being recognized by a Reuters list.

In 2000 he was the recipient of the Lazarsfeld Award for Methodological Contributions in Sociology, the highest award for methodologists given by the American Sociological Association.

== Books ==
- Bollen, Kenneth A. (1989). Structural equations with latent variables. Wiley series in probability and mathematical statistics. Applied probability and statistics. New York: Wiley. ISBN 978-0-471-01171-2.
- Bollen, Kenneth A.; Long, J. Scott, eds. (1993). Testing structural equation models. Sage focus editions. Newbury Park: Sage Publications. ISBN 978-0-8039-4506-7.
- Bollen, Kenneth A.; Curran, Patrick J. (2006). Latent curve models: a structural equation perspective. Wiley series in probability and statistics. Hoboken, N.J: Wiley-Interscience. ISBN 978-0-471-45592-9.
- Bollen, Kenneth A. (2026). Elements of structural equation models (SEMs). Cambridge, United Kingdom ; New York, NY: Cambridge University Press. ISBN 978-1-009-31282-0.
