= Guillermina Jasso =

American sociologist

Academic background
- Education: Our Lady of the Lake College ( B.A. 1962), University of Notre Dame (M.A. 1970), Johns Hopkins University (Ph.D 1974)
- Thesis: An Empirical Investigation of Distributive Justice (1974)
- Doctoral advisor: Peter H. Rossi

Academic work
- Institutions: New York University
- Main interests: Sociology, methodology, immigration, demography.

Guillermina Jasso is a sociologist who has significantly contributed to the demography of immigration to America. Jasso is currently the Silver professor of sociology at New York University where she was formerly Chair of the Department of Sociology. Jasso's research addresses distributive justice, inequality and stratification, mathematical methods for theoretical analysis, and survey methods for empirical analysis.

== Academia ==
She received her Bachelor of Arts in Sociology and Philosophy from Our Lady of the Lake College in 1962, and in 1970 she received a Master of Arts from the Department of Sociology and Anthropology at University of Notre Dame. Jasso received her Ph.D. from the Department of Social Relations at Johns Hopkins University in 1974. Jasso has been an assistant professor at Barnard College and Columbia University, Johns Hopkins University, and University of Michigan. Additionally, she has been a professor at University of Minnesota, University of Iowa, and presently at New York University.

From 1987 to 1992, Jasso was the Founding Director of the Program in Theoretical Analysis at the University of Iowa. Then, from 1992 to 1997, Jasso was the Founding Director of the Methods Workshop at New York University. She has been a Fellow of the Collegiate Institute for Values and Science at the University of Michigan since 1981. Additionally, she has been a Fellow at the Stanford Center on Poverty and Inequality at Stanford University since 2006. Jasso has been a member of the Society of Fellows at New York University since 2007, an External Research Fellow at the Centre for Research and Analysis of Migration at University College London since 2013, and a Fellow of the Global Labor Organization since 2017

Jasso has served as chair of several sections of the American Sociological Association, including Theory, Methodology, International Migration, Social Psychology, and the Rationality and Society Section. In 2015, Jasso won the Paul F. Lazarsfeld Award given by the American Sociological Association for a career of distinguished contributions to sociological methodology. She has been elected to the Executive Council of the Sociological Research Association (2018–2021), where she will serve as president in her final year.

Jasso is a frequent collaborator with Douglas Massey. Jasso's Erdős number is 3.
