= Harrison White =

American sociologist (1930–2024)

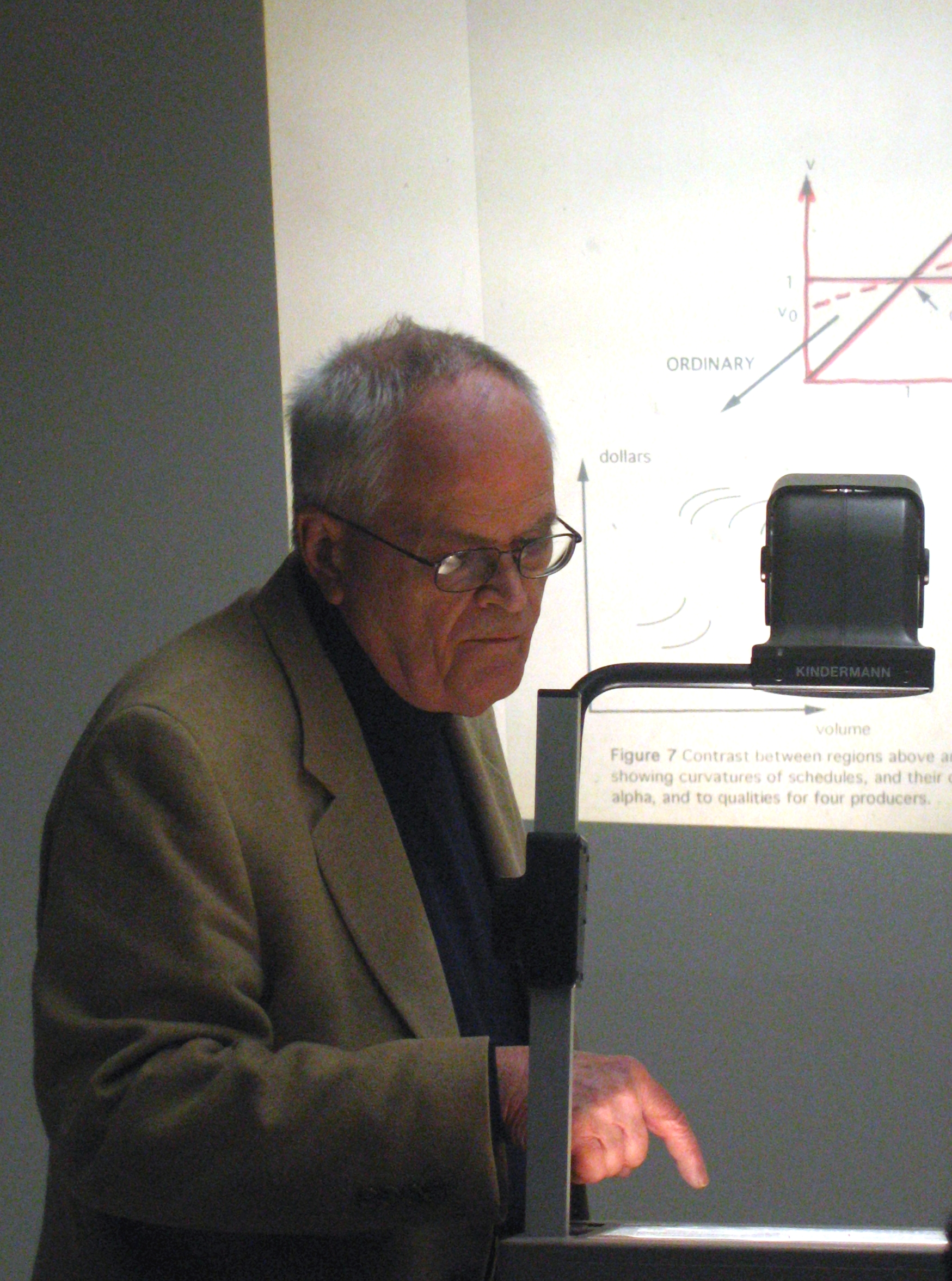
- Born: March 21, 1930; Washington, D.C., U.S.
- Died: May 18, 2024 (aged 94); Tucson, Arizona, U.S.
- Education: Massachusetts Institute of Technology, Princeton
- Scientific career
- Fields: Sociological theory; Social network analysis; Mathematical sociology
- Workplaces: University of Chicago; Harvard University; Columbia University; Carnegie Mellon University
- Doctoral advisor: John C. Slater (physics); Marion J. Levy Jr. (sociology)
- Doctoral students: Edward Laumann, Michael Schwartz, Mark Granovetter, Peter Bearman, Ronald Breiger, Barry Wellman, Richard Lachmann, Christopher Winship, Ann Mische, Kathleen Carley

Harrison Colyar White (March 21, 1930 – May 18, 2024) was an American sociologist who was the Giddings Professor of Sociology at Columbia University. White played an influential role in the “Harvard Revolution” in social networks and the New York School of relational sociology. He is credited with the development of a number of mathematical models of social structure including vacancy chains and blockmodels. He has been a leader of a revolution in sociology that is still in process, using models of social structure that are based on patterns of relations instead of the attributes and attitudes of individuals.

Among social network researchers, White is widely respected. For instance, at the 1997 International Network of Social Network Analysis conference, the organizer held a special “White Tie” event, dedicated to White. Social network researcher Emmanuel Lazega refers to him as both “Copernicus and Galileo” because he invented both the vision and the tools.

The most comprehensive documentation of his theories can be found in the book Identity and Control, first published in 1992. A major rewrite of the book appeared in June 2008. In 2011, White received the W.E.B. DuBois Career of Distinguished Scholarship Award from the American Sociological Association, which honors "scholars who have shown outstanding commitment to the profession of sociology and whose cumulative work has contributed in important ways to the advancement of the discipline." Before his retirement to live in Tucson, Arizona, White was interested in sociolinguistics and business strategy as well as sociology.

== Life and career ==
=== Early years ===
White was born on March 21, 1930, in Washington, D.C. He had three siblings and his father was a doctor in the US Navy. Although moving around to different Naval bases throughout his adolescence, he considered himself Southern, and Nashville, TN to be his home. At the age of 15, he entered the Massachusetts Institute of Technology (MIT), receiving his undergraduate degree at 20 years of age; five years later, in 1955, he received a doctorate in theoretical physics, also from MIT with John C. Slater as his advisor. His dissertation was titled A quantum-mechanical calculation of inter-atomic force constants in copper. This was published in the Physical Review as "Atomic Force Constants of Copper from Feynman's Theorem" (1958). While at MIT he also took a course with the political scientist Karl Deutsch, who White credits with encouraging him to move toward the social sciences.

=== Princeton University ===
After receiving his PhD in theoretical physics, he received a Fellowship from the Ford Foundation to begin his second doctorate in sociology at Princeton University. His dissertation advisor was Marion J. Levy. White also worked with Wilbert Moore, Fred Stephan, and Frank W. Notestein while at Princeton. His cohort was very small, with only four or five other graduate students including David Matza, and Stanley Udy.

At the same time, he took up a position as an operations analyst at the Operations Research Office, Johns Hopkins University from 1955 to 1956. During this period, he worked with Lee S. Christie on Queuing with Preemptive Priorities or with Breakdown, which was published in 1958. Christie previously worked alongside mathematical psychologist R. Duncan Luce in the Small Group Laboratory at MIT while White was completing his first PhD in physics also at MIT.

While continuing his studies at Princeton, White also spent a year as a fellow at the Center for Advanced Study in the Behavioral Sciences, Stanford University, California where he met Harold Guetzkow. Guetzkow was a faculty member at the Carnegie Institute of Technology, known for his application of simulations to social behavior and long-time collaborator with many other pioneers in organization studies, including Herbert A. Simon, James March, and Richard Cyert. Upon meeting Simon through his mutual acquaintance with Guetzkow, White received an invitation to move from California to Pittsburgh to work as an assistant professor of Industrial Administration and Sociology at the Graduate School of Industrial Administration, Carnegie Institute of Technology (later Carnegie-Mellon University), where he stayed for a couple of years, between 1957 and 1959. In an interview, he claimed to have fought with the dean, Leyland Bock, to have the word "sociology" included in his title.

It was also during his time at the Stanford Center for Advanced Study that White met his first wife, Cynthia A. Johnson, who was a graduate of Radcliffe College, where she had majored in art history. The couple's joint work on the French Impressionists, Canvases and Careers (1965) and “Institutional Changes in the French Painting World” (1964), originally grew out of a seminar on art in 1957 at the Center for Advanced Study led by Robert Wilson. White originally hoped to use sociometry to map the social structure of French art to predict shifts, but he had an epiphany that it was not social structure but institutional structure which explained the shift.

It was also during these years that White, still a graduate student in sociology, wrote and published his first social scientific work, "Sleep: A Sociological Interpretation" in Acta Sociologica in 1960, together with Vilhelm Aubert, a Norwegian sociologist. This work was a phenomenological examination of sleep which attempted to "demonstrate that sleep was more than a straightforward biological activity... [but rather also] a social event".

For his dissertation, White carried out empirical research on a research and development department in a manufacturing firm, consisting of interviews and a 110-item questionnaire with managers. He specifically used sociometric questions, which he used to model the "social structure" of relationships between various departments and teams in the organization. In May 1960 he submitted as his doctoral dissertation, titled Research and Development as a Pattern in Industrial Management: A Case Study in Institutionalisation and Uncertainty, earning a PhD in sociology from Princeton University. His first publication based on his dissertation was ''Management conflict and sociometric structure'' in the American Journal of Sociology.

=== University of Chicago ===
In 1959 James Coleman left the University of Chicago to found a new department of social relations at Johns Hopkins University, this left a vacancy open for a mathematical sociologist like White. He moved to Chicago to start working as an associate professor at the Department of Sociology. At that time, highly influential sociologists, such as Peter Blau, Mayer Zald, Elihu Katz, Everett Hughes, Erving Goffman were there. As Princeton only required one year in residence, and White took the opportunity to take positions at Johns Hopkins, Stanford, and Carnegie while still working on his dissertation, it was at Chicago that White credits as being his "real socialization in a way, into sociology." It was here that White advised his first two graduate students Joel H. Levine and Morris Friedell, both who went on to make contributions to social network analysis in sociology. While at the Center for Advanced Study, White began learning anthropology and became fascinated with kinship. During his stay at the University of Chicago White was able to finish An Anatomy of Kinship, published in 1963 within the Prentice-Hall series in Mathematical Analysis of Social Behavior, with James Coleman and James March as chief editors. The book received significant attention from many mathematical sociologists of the time, and contributed greatly to establish White as a model builder.

=== The Harvard Revolution ===
In 1963, White left Chicago to be an associate professor of sociology at the Harvard Department of Social Relations—the same department founded by Talcott Parsons and still heavily influenced by the structural-functionalist paradigm of Parsons. As White previously only taught graduate courses at Carnegie and Chicago, his first undergraduate course was An Introduction to Social Relations (see Influence) at Harvard, which became infamous among network analysts. As he "thought existing textbooks were grotesquely unscientific," the syllabus of the class was noted for including few readings by sociologists, and comparatively more readings by anthropologists, social psychologists, and historians. White was also a vocal critic of what he called the "attributes and attitudes" approach of Parsonsian sociology, and came to be the leader of what has been variously known as the “Harvard Revolution," the "Harvard breakthrough," or the "Harvard renaissance" in social networks. He worked closely with small group researchers George C. Homans and Robert F. Bales, which was largely compatible with his prior work in organizational research and his efforts to formalize network analysis. Overlapping White's early years, Charles Tilly, a graduate of the Harvard Department of Social Relations, was a visiting professor at Harvard and attended some of White's lectures - network thinking heavily influenced Tilly's work.

White remained at Harvard until 1986. In addition to a divorce from his wife, Cynthia, (with whom he published several works) and wanting a change, the sociology department at the University of Arizona offer him the position as department chair. He remained at Arizona for two years.

=== Columbia University ===
In 1988, White joined Columbia University as a professor of sociology and was the director of the Paul F. Lazarsfeld Center for the Social Sciences. This was at the early stages of what is perhaps the second major revolution in network analysis, the so-called "New York School of relational sociology." This invisible college included Columbia as well as the New School for Social Research and New York University. While the Harvard Revolution involved substantial advances in methods for measuring and modeling social structure, the New York School involved the merging of cultural sociology with network-structural sociology, two traditions which had previously been antagonistic. White stood at the heart of this, and his magnum opus Identity and Control was a testament to this new relational sociology.

In 1992, White received the named position of Giddings Professor of Sociology and was the chair of the department of sociology for various years until his retirement. He resided in Tucson, Arizona.

== Contributions ==
A good summary of White's sociological contributions is provided by his former student and collaborator, Ronald Breiger:

White addresses problems of social structure that cut across the range of the social sciences. Most notably, he has contributed (1) theories of role structures encompassing classificatory kinship systems of native Australian peoples and institutions of the contemporary West; (2) models based on equivalences of actors across networks of multiple types of social relation; (3) theorization of social mobility in systems of organizations; (4) a structural theory of social action that emphasizes control, agency, narrative, and identity; (5) a theory of artistic production; (6) a theory of economic production markets leading to the elaboration of a network ecology for market identities and new ways of accounting for profits, prices, and market shares; and (7) a theory of language use that emphasizes switching between social, cultural, and idiomatic domains within networks of discourse. His most explicit theoretical statement is Identity and Control: A Structural Theory of Social Action (1992), although several of the major components of his theory of the mutual shaping of networks, institutions, and agency are also readily apparent in Careers and Creativity: Social Forces in the Arts (1993), written for a less-specialized audience.

More generally, White and his students sparked interest in looking at society as networks rather than as aggregates of individuals.

This view is still controversial. In sociology and organizational science, it is difficult to measure cause and effect in a systematic way. Because of that, it is common to use sampling techniques to discover some sort of average in a population.

For instance, we are told almost daily how the average European or American feels about a topic. It allows social scientists and pundits to make inferences about cause and say “people are angry at the current administration because the economy is doing poorly.” This kind of generalization certainly makes sense, but it does not tell us anything about an individual. This leads to the idea of an idealized individual, something that is the bedrock of modern economics. Most modern economic theories look at social formations, like organizations, as products of individuals all acting in their own best interest.

While this has proved to be useful in some cases, it does not account well for the knowledge that is required for the structures to sustain themselves. White and his students (and his students' students) have been developing models that incorporate the patterns of relationships into descriptions of social formations. This line of work includes: economic sociology, network sociology and structuralist sociology.

=== Identity and control ===
White's most comprehensive work is Identity and Control. The first edition came out in 1992 and the second edition appeared in June 2008.

In this book, White discusses the social world, including “persons,” as emerging from patterns of relationships. He argues that it is a default human heuristic to organize the world in terms of attributes, but that this can often be a mistake. For instance, there are countless books on leadership that look for the attributes that make a good leader. However, no one is a leader without followers; the term describes a relationship one has with others. Without the relationships, there would be no leader. Likewise, an organization can be viewed as patterns of relationships. It would not “exist” if people did not honor and maintain specific relationships. White avoids giving attributes to things that emerge from patterns of relationships, something that goes against our natural instincts and requires some thought to process.

Identity and Control has seven chapters. The first six are about social formations that control us and how our own judgment organizes our experience in ways that limit our actions. The final chapter is about “getting action” and how change is possible. One of the ways is by “proxy,” empowering others.

=== Markets from networks ===
Harrison White also developed a perspective on market structure and competition in his 2002 book, Markets from Networks, based on the idea that markets are embedded in social networks. His approach is related to economic concepts such as uncertainty (as defined by Frank Knight), monopolistic competition (Edward Chamberlin), or signalling (Spence). This sociological perspective on markets has influenced both sociologists (see Joel M. Podolny) and economists (see Olivier Favereau).

=== Later work ===
White's later work discussed linguistics. In Identity and Control he emphasized “switching” between network domains as a way to account for grammar in a way that does not ignore meaning as does much of standard linguistic theory. He had a long-standing interest in organizations, and before he retired, he worked on how strategy fits into the overall models of social construction he has developed.

== Influence ==
...White can to some extent be described as a sociologist for sociologists, just as there are “musicians for musicians” who inspire their peers but remain inaccessible to a wider audience.

In addition to his own publications, White is widely credited with training many influential generations of network analysts in sociology. Including the early work in the 1960s and 1970s during the Harvard Revolution, as well as the 1980s and 1990s at Columbia during the New York School of relational sociology.

White's student and teaching assistant, Michael Schwartz, took notes in the spring of 1965, known as Notes on the Constituents of Social Structure, of White's undergraduate Introduction to Social Relations course (Soc Rel 10). These notes were circulated among network analysis students and aficionados, until finally published in 2008 in Sociologica. As popular social science blog Orgtheory.net explains, "in contemporary American sociology, there are no set of student-taken notes that have had as much underground influence as those from Harrison White’s introductory Soc Rel 10 seminar at Harvard."

The first generation of Harvard graduate students that trained with White during the 1960s went on to be a formidable cohort of network analytically inclined sociologists. His first graduate student at Harvard was Edward Laumann who went onto develop one of the most widely used methods of studying personal networks known as ego-network surveys (developed with one of Laumann's students at the University of Chicago, Ronald Burt). Several of them went on to contribute to the "Toronto school" of structural analysis. Barry Wellman, for instance, contributed heavily to the cross fertilization of network analysis and community studies, later contributing to the earliest studies of online communities. Another of White's earliest students at Harvard was Nancy Lee (now Nancy Howell) who used social network analysis in her groundbreaking study of how women seeking an abortion found willing doctors before Roe v. Wade. She found that women found doctors through links of friends and acquaintances and was four degrees separated from the doctor on average. White also trained later additions to the Toronto school, Harriet Friedmann ('77) and Bonnie Erickson ('73).

One of White's most well-known graduate students was Mark Granovetter, who attended Harvard as a Ph.D. student from 1965 to 1970. Granovetter studied how people got jobs, discovered they were more likely to get them through acquaintances than through friends. Recounting the development of his widely cited 1973 article, "The Strength of Weak Ties", Granovetter credits White's lectures and specifically White's description of sociometric work by Anatol Rapaport and William Horrath that gave him the idea. This, tied with earlier work by Stanley Milgram (who was also in the Harvard Department of Social Relations 1963–1967, though not one of White's students), gave scientists a better sense of how the social world was organized: into many dense groups with “weak ties” between them. Granovetter's work provided the theoretical background for Malcolm Gladwell's The Tipping Point. This line of research is still actively being pursued by Duncan Watts, Albert-László Barabási, Mark Newman, Jon Kleinberg and others.

White's research on “vacancy chains” was assisted by a number of graduate students, including Michael Schwartz and Ivan Chase. The outcome of this was the book Chains of Opportunity. The book described a model of social mobility where the roles and the people that filled them were independent. The idea of a person being partially created by their position in patterns of relationships has become a recurring theme in his work. This provided a quantitative analysis of social roles, allowing scientists new ways to measure society that were not based on statistical aggregates.

During the 1970s, White work with his student's Scott Boorman, Ronald Breiger, and François Lorrain on a series of articles that introduce a procedure called "blockmodeling" and the concept of "structural equivalence." The key idea behind these articles was identifying a "position" or "role" through similarities in individuals' social structure, rather than characteristics intrinsic to the individuals or a priori definitions of group membership.

At Columbia, White trained a new cohort of researchers who pushed network analysis beyond methodological rigor to theoretical extension and the incorporation of previously neglected concepts, namely, culture and language.

Many of his students and mentees have had a strong impact in sociology. Other former students include Michael Schwartz and Ivan Chase, both professors at Stony Brook; Joel Levine, who founded Dartmouth College's Math/Social Science program; Edward Laumann who pioneered survey-based egocentric network research and became a dean and provost at University of Chicago; Kathleen Carley at Carnegie Mellon University; Ronald Breiger at the University of Arizona; Barry Wellman at the University of Toronto and then the NetLab Network; Peter Bearman at Columbia University; Bonnie Erickson (Toronto); Christopher Winship (Harvard University); Joel Levine (Dartmouth College), Nicholas Mullins (Virginia Tech, deceased), Margaret Theeman (Boulder), Brian Sherman (retired, Atlanta), Nancy Howell (retired, Toronto); David R. Gibson (University of Notre Dame); Matthew Bothner (University of Chicago); Ann Mische (University of Notre Dame); Kyriakos Kontopoulos (Temple University); and Frédéric Godart (INSEAD).

== Death ==
White died at an assisted living facility in Tucson, on May 19, 2024, at the age of 94.

== Selected works ==
=== Books ===
- White, Harrison C.; White, Cynthia A. (1965). Canvases and Careers: Institutional Change in the French Painting World. New York: Wiley. LCCN 65-19469.
- ——— (1992). Identity and Control: A Structural Theory of Social Action. Princeton, New Jersey: Princeton University Press.
- ———; White, Cynthia A. (1993). Canvases and Careers: Institutional Change in the French Painting World. Chicago: University of Chicago Press.
- ——— (1993). Careers and Creativity: Social Forces in the Arts. Boulder, Colorado: Westview Press.
- ——— (2002). Markets from Networks: Socioeconomic Models of Production. Princeton, New Jersey: Princeton University Press. ISBN 9780691120386.
- White, Harrison C. (2008). Identity and Control: How Social Formations Emerge (2 ed.). Princeton, New Jersey: Princeton University Press. ISBN 978-0-691-13715-5.

=== Articles and book chapters ===
- White, Harrison C. (1988). "Varieties of Markets". In Barry Wellman and S. D. Berkowitz (eds.). Social Structures: A Network Approach. Cambridge: Cambridge University Press.
- White, Harrison C. (1992). "Markets, Networks and Control". In S. Lindenberg and Hein Schroeder (eds.). Interdisciplinary Perspectives on Organization. Oxford: Pergamon Press, 1992.
- White, Harrison C. (1994). "Values Comes in Styles, Which Mate to Change". In Michael Hechter, Lynn Nadel and R. Michod (eds.). The Origin of Values. New York: Aldine de Gruyter.
- White, Harrison C. (1995). "Network Switchings and Bayesian Forks: Reconstructing the Social and Behavioral Sciences". Social Research 62(4):1035 – 1063.
- White, Harrison C. (1995). "Social Networks Can Resolve Actor Paradoxes in Economics and in Psychology". Journal of Institutional and Theoretical Economics 151:58-74.
- White, Harrison C. (1997). "Can Mathematics Be Social? Flexible Representation for Interaction Process in its Socio-Cultural Constructions". Sociological Forum 12:53-71.
- White, Harrison C., Frédéric C. Godart, and Victor P. Corona (2007). "Mobilizing Identities: Uncertainty and Control in Strategy". Theory, Culture & Society 24(7-8):181-202.
