= Michael Schwartz (sociologist) =

American sociologist and Iraq War critic

Michael H. Schwartz
- Born: May 9, 1942 (age 84)
- Education: University of California, Berkeley (B.A. 1964); Harvard University (Ph.D. 1971)
- Scientific career
- Fields: Sociology
- Workplaces: State University of New York at Stony Brook
- Thesis: The Southern Farmers' Alliance: The Organizational Forms of Radical Protest (1971)
- Doctoral advisor: Harrison White
- Doctoral students: Kenneth Andrews, Dan Clawson, Mark Mizruchi,

Michael Herman Schwartz (born May 9, 1942) is an American sociologist and prominent critic of the Iraq War. He is a Distinguished Teaching Professor Emeritus of Sociology at the State University of New York at Stony Brook in New York, where he also serves as faculty director of the Undergraduate College of Global Studies and Chair of the Sociology Department. Schwartz has written extensively in the areas of economic sociology and social movements.

== Career ==
Schwartz received his doctorate from the Department of Social Relations, Harvard University, where he was a student of Harrison White and Charles Tilly. His writings on Iraq have appeared in TomDispatch, Asia Times, Mother Jones, and Contexts. In Radical Protest and Social Structure, Schwartz develops the concept of "structural ignorance" to refer to how individuals make choices and decisions in regard to collective action based on their position in the social structure, which constrains their access to relevant information.

== Books ==
=== Solely authored books ===
- Schwartz, Michael (2008). War Without End: The Iraq War in Context. Chicago: Haymarket Books. ISBN 9781931859547.
- Schwartz, Michael (1976). Radical Protest and Social Structure: The Southern Farmers' Alliance and Cotton Tenancy, 1880–1890. New York: Academic Press. ISBN 0126328501.

=== Co-authored books ===
- Young, Kevin A.; Banerjee, Tarun; Schwartz, Michael (2020). Levers of Power: How the 1% Rules and What the 99% Can Do About It. New York: Verso Books. ISBN 9781788730969.
- Murray, Joshua; Schwartz, Murray (2019). Wrecked: How the American Automobile Industry Destroyed its Capacity to Compete. New York: Russell Sage Foundation. ISBN 9780871548207.
- Mintz, Beth; Schwartz, Michael (1985). The Power Structure of American Business. Chicago: University of Chicago Press.

=== Edited books ===
- Schwartz, Michael, ed. (1987). Structure of Power in America: The Corporate Elite As a Ruling Class. Teaneck, NJ: Holmes & Meier Publishers. ISBN 9780841907645.

== Articles ==
- Takuyoshi Takada, Beth Mintz, and Michael Schwartz (eds.) Corporate Control, Capital Institute of Business Research. Tokyo: Chuo University Press, 1996.
- Romo, Frank; Schwartz, Michael (1995). "The Structural Embeddedness of Business Decisions". American Sociological Review. 60 (6): 874–907. doi:10.2307/2096431. JSTOR 2096431.

== See also ==
- Social Movement Theories
- Opposition to the Iraq War
