= Emilio J. Castilla =

Spanish organizational sociologist and management scholar

- Born: Spain

Academic background
- Education: University of Barcelona (BA); Lancaster University (PGDip); Stanford University (PhD)
- Doctoral advisor: Mark Granovetter

Academic work
- Discipline: Sociology
- Sub-discipline: Economic sociology, organizational behavior, human resource management
- Institutions: Wharton School of the University of Pennsylvania (2002–2005); MIT Sloan School of Management (2005–present)
- Notable works: The Meritocracy Paradox (2025)
- Website: emiliojcastilla.org

Emilio J. Castilla is a Spanish organizational sociologist and management scholar whose research examines meritocracy, workplace inequality, social networks, and talent-management practices. He is the NTU Professor of Management and Professor of Work and Organization Studies at the MIT Sloan School of Management, where he co-directs the Institute for Work and Employment Research. He previously taught at the Wharton School of the University of Pennsylvania. In 2024 he was named chair of the Organization and Management Theory division of the Academy of Management.

Castilla is best known for his work on the limits of meritocracy, in particular for the finding that managers in organizations that openly present themselves as meritocratic may display greater demographic bias than managers in organizations that do not. His book The Meritocracy Paradox: Where Talent Management Strategies Go Wrong and How to Fix Them (Columbia University Press, 2025) won the 2026 George R. Terry Book Award for outstanding contributions to the advancement of management knowledge.

== Early life and education ==
Castilla grew up in Santa Coloma de Gramenet, a suburb of Barcelona, where he attended public primary and secondary schools. One of the first members of his family to go to college, he studied economics at the University of Barcelona. He won a European Union scholarship to study abroad at Lancaster University Management School in the United Kingdom, where he earned a post-graduate diploma in management.

After graduating in 1995 with a BA in economics, Castilla moved to the United States to pursue a PhD in sociology at Stanford University, where his doctoral advisor was economic sociologist Mark Granovetter. At Stanford, he won a Centennial Teaching Award in 1998 and the Leila Arthur Cilker Teaching Award from the Department of Sociology in 1999. He received his PhD in 2002.

== Career ==
In 2002 Castilla joined the management department of the Wharton School of the University of Pennsylvania. In 2005 he moved to the MIT Sloan School of Management, where he held the W. Maurice Young (1961) Career Development Professorship in Business from 2006 to 2012. He was appointed to the NTU Professorship in Management in 2014.

At MIT, he has served as head of the Work and Organization Studies group and is co-director of the Institute for Work and Employment Research. He retains research fellowships at the Wharton Financial Institutions Center and the Center for Human Resources at the Wharton School. He has also been affiliated with the Clayman Institute for Gender Research at Stanford. Since 2025, he has held a Cátedra Rafael del Pino, a chair awarded by the Spanish Fundación Rafael del Pino to Spanish academics working at international centres of research and teaching.

Castilla teaches in the MBA, executive, and doctoral programs at MIT Sloan, where his courses have covered topics such as strategic human resource management, people analytics, talent management, and organizational behavior.

He has served on the editorial board of Work and Occupations and as an associate editor of Management Science and the ILR Review. In October 2024 he was announced as the incoming chair of the Organization and Management Theory division of the Academy of Management, having previously served the division as program chair elect, program chair, and division chair elect.

== Research ==
=== Social networks and employment ===
Castilla's early research, conducted with Roberto M. Fernandez and Paul Moore, used personnel records from a telephone call center to examine how employee referrals affect hiring and subsequent performance. A related 2005 paper in the American Journal of Sociology reported that workers hired through referrals performed differently depending on whether the employee who referred them remained at the firm, a finding Castilla attributed to the ongoing social relationship rather than to referral as a screening device. He returned to the topic in a 2022 Organization Science article examining how the career benefits of workplace networks vary by gender and race.

=== Meritocracy and workplace inequality ===
Castilla has carried out extensive research into inequality in the workplace. A 2008 article in the American Journal of Sociology, "Gender, Race, and Meritocracy in Organizational Careers", analyzed personnel data from a large service organization. It found that women and minority employees received smaller salary increases than white male employees with equivalent performance scores, supervisors, and job roles.

In 2010, with Stephen Benard, Castilla published "The Paradox of Meritocracy in Organizations" in Administrative Science Quarterly. Across three experiments, the authors found that if a hypothetical employer's stated core values emphasized meritocracy, managers awarded larger bonuses to male employees than to female employees with identical performance records; the gender difference was smaller where meritocracy was not emphasized, and it appeared among male and female evaluators alike. The researchers proposed that a belief in the organization's own fairness may reduce managers' vigilance about their decisions. The article received the Academy of Management Organizational Behavior division's Outstanding Publication award in 2011, and the finding has since been discussed in coverage of merit-based pay in the business press.

Castilla subsequently examined organizational remedies for such disparities. A 2011 article in the American Sociological Review, "Bringing Managers Back In: Managerial Influences on Workplace Inequality", tested three mechanisms by which managers may shape the assessment of employee performance: social network influence between an employee's current and former managers; demographic similarity between managers; and demographic similarity between a manager and an employee. Castilla reported evidence for each of the three, and argued that the first two operate over and above the more widely studied manager–employee mechanism. A 2015 field study in Organization Science reported that increasing accountability and transparency in pay decisions was associated with reduced demographic disparities in salary increases at the firm studied. With Aruna Ranganathan, he examined how managers themselves understand and apply the concept of merit in performance reviews. A 2016 MIT Sloan Management Review article drawing on this body of work, "Achieving Meritocracy in the Workplace", received the 2017 Richard Beckhard Memorial Prize.

Castilla's research on accountability and transparency in organizational decision-making has also been cited in policy discussion outside the workplace, including proposals to reduce racial disparities in policing.

=== Immigration and work authorization ===
With Ben A. Rissing, Castilla studied United States employment-based visa and permanent residency decisions. A 2014 American Sociological Review article reported that applications on behalf of workers from Latin American countries were less likely to be approved than otherwise comparable applications from other regions. The authors suggested that auditing the review process, or removing demographic information from applications during screening, could reduce the disparity. A follow-up study examined how local unemployment conditions related to the certification of immigrant work authorizations.

=== Selection, endorsement, and legacy preferences ===
Castilla and Rissing analyzed letters of recommendation in business school admissions in a 2019 Administrative Science Quarterly article. In 2022, Castilla and Ethan J. Poskanzer published "Through the Front Door: Why Do Organizations (Still) Prefer Legacy Applicants?" in the American Sociological Review, based on sixteen years of admissions data from a highly selective American college. They reported that although legacy applicants were about twice as likely to be admitted as non-legacy applicants, the data did not support the view that legacy applicants were more qualified or performed better academically. The admissions advantage was instead associated with the material benefits such applicants brought the institution. The study was widely cited in press coverage of the debate over legacy preferences in United States college admissions, including in The Hechinger Report, U.S. News & World Report, and Forbes.

=== Gendered language in recruitment ===
A 2023 article with Hye Jin Rho in Management Science examined gendered language in online job postings and its relationship to applicant pools. Combining an observational study with a two-stage field experiment, Castilla and Rho found negligible effects of either the gendered wording of a posting or the gender of the recruiter on whether women and men applied for a job. They concluded that rewriting job advertisements in gender-neutral language is unlikely on its own to change the gender composition of applicant pools, a result at odds with a practice widely promoted by recruitment-software vendors.

== The Meritocracy Paradox ==
Castilla's book The Meritocracy Paradox: Where Talent Management Strategies Go Wrong and How to Fix Them was published by Columbia University Press in 2025. Drawing on two decades of his research, the book argues that organizations that treat merit as a guiding principle without examining how merit is defined and measured may reproduce the inequalities such systems are intended to remove. In the book, Castilla proposes a data-driven approach to talent management: defining merit explicitly, measuring employment outcomes consistently, analyzing the resulting data for inefficiencies and inequities, intervening with targeted evidence-based changes, and monitoring the results over time.

The Meritocracy Paradox won the 2026 George R. Terry Book Award, granted by the Academy of Management for outstanding contributions to the advancement of management knowledge. It was also shortlisted for the 2025 Thinkers50 Talent Award, received a Gold award in the business and leadership category of the 2026 Nautilus Book Awards, and a bronze medal in the human resources and employee training category of the 2026 Axiom Business Book Awards.

== Awards and honors ==
- W. Richard Scott Award for Distinguished Scholarship, American Sociological Association Section on Organizations, Occupations, and Work, for "Social Capital at Work" (2001)
- Best Dissertation Award, International Sociological Association (2001)
- Social Science Research Council award and fellowship, Program on the Corporation as a Social Institution (2001)
- Clifford C. Clogg Award and Fellowship, American Sociological Association Methodology Section (1998)
- Outstanding Publication in Organizational Behavior Award, Academy of Management OB Division, for "The Paradox of Meritocracy in Organizations" (2011)
- Premio Fundación Banco Herrero (2012), awarded annually to a Spanish social scientist under the age of 40
- Richard Beckhard Memorial Prize, MIT Sloan Management Review, for "Achieving Meritocracy in the Workplace" (2017)
- George R. Terry Book Award, Academy of Management, for The Meritocracy Paradox (2026)

== Selected publications ==
=== Books ===
- Castilla, Emilio J. (2025). The Meritocracy Paradox: Where Talent Management Strategies Go Wrong and How to Fix Them. New York: Columbia University Press. ISBN 978-0-231-20842-0.
- Castilla, Emilio J. (2007). Dynamic Analysis in the Social Sciences. Burlington, MA: Elsevier/Academic Press. ISBN 978-0-12-088485-8.
- Castilla, Emilio J. (1998). Análisis Dinámico (in Spanish). Madrid: Centro de Investigaciones Sociológicas. ISBN 978-84-7476-269-3.

=== Articles ===
- Fernandez, Roberto M.; Castilla, Emilio J.; Moore, Paul (2000). "Social Capital at Work: Networks and Employment at a Phone Center". American Journal of Sociology. 105 (5): 1288–1356. doi:10.1086/210432.
- Castilla, Emilio J. (2005). "Social Networks and Employee Performance in a Call Center". American Journal of Sociology. 110 (5): 1243–1283. doi:10.1086/427319.
- Castilla, Emilio J. (2008). "Gender, Race, and Meritocracy in Organizational Careers". American Journal of Sociology. 113 (6): 1479–1526. doi:10.1086/588738.
- Castilla, Emilio J.; Benard, Stephen (2010). "The Paradox of Meritocracy in Organizations". Administrative Science Quarterly. 55 (4): 543–576. doi:10.2189/asqu.2010.55.4.543. hdl:1721.1/65884.
- Castilla, Emilio J. (2011). "Bringing Managers Back In: Managerial Influences on Workplace Inequality". American Sociological Review. 76 (5): 667–694. doi:10.1177/0003122411420814.
- Rissing, Ben A.; Castilla, Emilio J. (2014). "House of Green Cards: Statistical or Preference-Based Inequality in the Employment of Foreign Nationals". American Sociological Review. 79 (6): 1226–1255. doi:10.1177/0003122414553656.
- Castilla, Emilio J. (2015). "Accounting for the Gap: A Firm Study Manipulating Organizational Accountability and Transparency in Pay Decisions". Organization Science. 26 (2): 311–333. doi:10.1287/orsc.2014.0950.
- Castilla, Emilio J. (2017). "Meritocracy". In Moghaddam, Fathali M. (ed.). The SAGE Encyclopedia of Political Behavior. Thousand Oaks, CA: SAGE Publications. pp. 479–482. doi:10.4135/9781483391144.n217.
- Castilla, Emilio J.; Rissing, Ben A. (2019). "Best in Class? The Returns on Application Endorsements in Higher Education". Administrative Science Quarterly. 64 (1): 230–270. doi:10.1177/0001839218759965.
- Castilla, Emilio J.; Ranganathan, Aruna (2020). "The Production of Merit: How Managers Understand and Apply Merit in the Workplace". Organization Science. 31 (4): 909–935. doi:10.1287/orsc.2019.1335. hdl:1721.1/135242.
- Castilla, Emilio J.; Poskanzer, Ethan J. (2022). "Through the Front Door: Why Do Organizations (Still) Prefer Legacy Applicants?". American Sociological Review. 87 (5): 782–826. doi:10.1177/00031224221122889.
- Castilla, Emilio J. (2022). "Gender, Race, and Network Advantage in Organizations". Organization Science. 33 (6): 2364–2403. doi:10.1287/orsc.2021.1534.
- Castilla, Emilio J.; Rho, Hye Jin (2023). "The Gendering of Job Postings in the Online Recruitment Process". Management Science. 69 (11): 6912–6939. doi:10.1287/mnsc.2023.4674.
- Rissing, Ben A.; Castilla, Emilio J. (2023). "Collecting, Coding, and Analyzing Observational Records from Real Organizations: "Best in Class" Analytical Techniques". SAGE Research Methods: Business. London: SAGE Publications. doi:10.4135/9781529667370.

=== Other writings ===
- Castilla, Emilio J. (Summer 2016). "Achieving Meritocracy in the Workplace". MIT Sloan Management Review. Vol. 57, no. 4. pp. 35–41.
- Castilla, Emilio J. (September 9, 2025). "A Data-Driven Approach to Advancing Meritocracy". MIT Sloan Management Review.
- Castilla, Emilio J. (August 17, 2026). "The Power of Opportunity Mindset in Hiring". MIT Sloan Management Review.
