= Structural Equations with Latent Variables =

Statistics textbook

- Author: Kenneth Bollen
- Language: English
- Subject: Structural equation modeling
- Publisher: John Wiley & Sons
- Publication date: June, 1989
- Pages: 528
- ISBN: 978-0-471-01171-2

Structural Equations with Latent Variables is a statistics textbook on structural equation modeling by social scientist and statistician Kenneth Bollen. Published in 1989, it covers topics in the statistics like measurement validity, reliability, overall fit indices, model identification, causality, and the statistical software package LISREL. Examples from sociology, economics, and psychology are used in the textbook to illustrate the practical applications of these methods. The book examines covariances rather than individual cases. It is used in graduate-level courses that focus on structural equation modeling within the social sciences.
