= Albert Bergesen =

American sociologist

- Education: University of California, Santa Barbara (B.A.); Stanford University M.A. Stanford University (PhD)
- Known for: cultural sociology, organizational sociology, social network analysis, mathematical models
- Scientific career
- Fields: Sociology
- Workplaces: University of Arizona
- Doctoral students: Omar Lizardo

Albert James Bergesen is an American sociologist and Professor and Head of the Department of Sociology at University of Arizona. He is also a professor of Government and Public Policy, and Professor of Sociology in the McGuire Center for Entrepreneurship, at the Eller College of Management. He has published three books, edited five anthologies, authored hundreds of articles, and is cited in numerous fields, such as collective violence, international relations, world-systems analysis, environmental sociology, cultural sociology and organizational sociology.

== Career ==
Albert Bergesen attended the University of California, Santa Barbara and received a BA in 1964 in History. He went on to attend Stanford University and completed an M.A. in Education in 1966. Continuing his education at Stanford University, Bergesen completed his M.A. in 1971 and his PhD in 1974, both in Sociology. In 1973, Bergesen took a position as Assistant Professor and then associate professor of sociology at the University of Arizona. He advanced to Full Professor in 1987. In 1995, Bergesen was a Fellow at the Udall Center for the Study of Public Policy, and in 2003, he was a visiting professor of sociology at Stanford University.

== Contributions ==
Bergesen's 1980 publication "Official Violence During the Watts, Newark, and Detroit Race Riots of the 1960s" was awarded an Honorable Mention for the Gordon Allport Intergroup Relations Prize from the Society for the Psychological Study of Social Issues.

His 1992 article "Regime Change in the Semiperiphery: Democratization in Latin America and the Socialists Bloc" and his 1995 article "The rise of Semiotic Marxism" won the Distinguished Contribution Award from the Pacific Sociological Association for best article published in Sociological Perspectives within a two-year period.

In 2003, Bergesen co-authored the book God in the Movies with sociologists of religion Andrew Greeley, in which the "authors show that the religious imagination is irrepressible, and shows up in our best-known example of popular cultures, movies." The book emerged from a class Greely first taught at the University of Chicago, and then co-taught with Bergesen at the University of Arizona. In the introduction, both sociologists take a unique stance as self-proclaimed theists and argue that it is not sociology's place to argue whether there is a god, but rather what such a god might be like. Reviewer Carl Flynn contends that "as a collection, these essays make a substantial contribution to the broadening dialogue in academic circles about the interaction between theology and film in modern society." However, the book was also written for popular appeal as one media piece describes it:""God in the Movies," is a treasure map for moviegoers looking for the deeper spiritual significance of today's films, especially in movies where God makes an appearance." In the preface to the first edition, well-known movie critic Roger Ebert states that "what is so valuable about...this book [Greeley] has written with Bergesen, is that it reminds readers and students that movies really are about something...They embody our dreams, desires, and aspirations, and give form to them. And if God takes the form of Audrey Hepburn-well, why not?"

Bergesen, with colleagues Robert Wuthnow, James Davison Hunter, and Edith Kurzweil, is the editor of the anthology Cultural Analysis: The Work of Peter L. Berger, Mary Douglas, Michel Foucault, and Jürgen Habermas. First published in 1984, it is now in its fifth edition.

In addition to the sociology of culture, Bergesen has made several contributions to world-systems analysis, including editing three anthologies, Studies of the Modern World-System published in 1980; Crisis in the World-System in 1983; and America's Changing Role in the World-System with Terry Boswell published in 1987. He has also been the editor of three special issues of academic journals: on the "World-systems and the Environment" in 1997 and on "Global Inequality" in 2002 for the Journal of World-Systems Research; and in 1982 on "World-System Studies" for the Anthro-Tech: A Journal of Speculative Anthropology.

His most recent work focuses on terrorism, collective violence and transnational sociology. He wrote the entry "Terrorism" in The Wiley-Blackwell Encyclopedia of Globalization, and an introduction to research terrorism for a special issue of the journal Mobilization, in which he argues for a comparative-historical approach to terrorism studies.

He also completed an edited anthology of the work of the radical Islamic scholar Sayyid Qutb, published in 2008. The Sayyid Qutb Reader is "the first...survey of the works of Sayyid Qutb in a major Western press."
