= RSF: The Russell Sage Foundation Journal of the Social Sciences =

- Discipline: Social sciences
- Language: English

Publication details
- History: 2015–present
- Publisher: Russell Sage Foundation (United States)
- Frequency: Triannual
- Open access: Yes
- Impact factor: 3.9 (2024)

Standard abbreviations
- ISO 4: RSF (New York, N.Y.)
- NLM: RSF

Indexing
- ISSN: 2377-8253 (print); 2377-8261 (web)
- LCCN: 2015200182
- OCLC no.: 904721000

Links
- Journal homepage; Online access; Online archive

RSF: The Russell Sage Foundation Journal of the Social Sciences is a triannual peer-reviewed open-access academic journal covering social science. It is published by the Russell Sage Foundation, an American non-profit organisation founded in 1907 by Margaret Olivia Sage and named in memory of her husband Russell Sage. The journal was established in 2015 and publishes thematic issues which focus on a specific research question or topic. Each issue of the journal addresses a particular theme or question. These issues often reflect on a particular period, publication, or policy. Issues are proposed to the Director of Publications and reflect the foundation's focus on issues pertaining to the United States of America. It is required that each issue involves editors from different social science disciplines.

== Abstracting and indexing ==
The journal is abstracted and indexed in:

- Current Contents/Social and Behavioral Sciences
- Directory of Open Access Journals
- EBSCO databases
- EconLit
- Modern Language Association International Bibliography
- ProQuest databases
- PsycINFO
- Scopus
- Social Sciences Citation Index

According to the Journal Citation Reports, the journal has a 2024 impact factor of 3.9.
