= Mark Granovetter =

American sociologist (born 1943)

- Born: Mark Sanford Granovetter; October 20, 1943 (age 82); Jersey City, New Jersey, US
- Education: Princeton University (AB); Harvard University (PhD)
- Known for: Social network theory
- Scientific career
- Fields: Sociology
- Workplaces: Johns Hopkins University; Harvard University; Stony Brook University; Northwestern University; Stanford University
- Thesis: Changing jobs : channels of mobility information in a suburban population (1970)
- Doctoral advisor: Harrison White
- Doctoral students: Emilio J. Castilla; Mark Mizruchi; Brian Uzzi
- Other notable students: Walter W. Powell
- Website: profiles.stanford.edu/mark-granovetter

Mark Sanford Granovetter (/ˈɡrænəvɛtər/; born October 20, 1943) is an American sociologist and a professor emeritus at Stanford University. He is best known for his work in social network theory and economic sociology. His 1973 paper "The Strength of Weak Ties" is one of the most frequently cited social science articles of all time.

After earning his PhD in sociology from Harvard University in 1970, Granovetter taught at Johns Hopkins University (1970–73), Harvard (1973–77), Stony Brook University (1977–92) and Northwestern University (1992–95). In 1995 he moved to Stanford, where he subsequently became the Joan Butler Ford Professor in the School of Humanities and Sciences. He retired in 2025.

== Early life and education ==
Raised in Jersey City, New Jersey, Granovetter was the valedictorian of the class of 1961 at Henry Snyder High School.

Granovetter earned a Bachelor of Arts degree in history at Princeton University (1965) and a PhD in sociology at Harvard University (1970). At Harvard his research was supervised by Harrison White.

== Career and research ==
Granovetter was an assistant professor of social relations at Johns Hopkins University from 1970 to 1973. He then moved to Harvard University, where he was an assistant professor and, later, associate professor in sociology until 1977. He moved to Stony Brook University in 1977, where he eventually became a professor of sociology and stayed until 1992. In 1989, he was the chair of the sociology department at Stony Brook. He was professor of sociology and organization behavior at Northwestern University from 1992 to 1995. In 1995, Granovetter joined Stanford University, where he was the Joan Butler Ford Professor in the School of Humanities and Sciences from at least 2005 until his retirement in 2025. He chaired of the Department of Sociology twice. In 2020, he was elected a member of the National Academy of Sciences.

=== The Strength of Weak Ties ===
Granovetter's paper The Strength of Weak Ties is one of the most influential articles in social science, with more than 78,000 citations according to Google Scholar (As of November 2025). Its thesis is that weak ties—acquaintanceships that are not reinforced by many mutual friendships—are especially pivotal in the flow of information. It has become a core idea in the field of social networks. In marketing, information science, or politics, weak ties enable reaching populations and audiences that are not accessible via strong ties. The concepts and findings of this work were later published in the monograph Getting A Job, an adaptation of Granovetter's doctoral dissertation at Harvard University's Department of Social Relations, with the title: "Changing Jobs: Channels of Mobility Information in a Suburban Population" (313 pages).

In 1969, Granovetter submitted the paper to American Sociological Review, but it was rejected. Eventually this pioneering research was published in 1973 in the American Journal of Sociology and became the most cited work in the social sciences.

=== Economic sociology: Embeddedness ===
In the field of economic sociology, Granovetter has been a leader since the publication in 1985 of an article that launched "new economic sociology", "Economic Action and Social Structure: The Problem of Embeddedness". This article caused Granovetter to be identified with the concept of "embeddedness", the idea that economic relations between individuals or firms are embedded in actual social networks and do not exist in an abstract idealized market. The concept of embeddedness originated with Karl Polanyi in his book The Great Transformation, where Polanyi posited that all economies are embedded in social relations and institutions. Granovetter also published a book called Society and Economy (2017).

=== "Tipping points" and threshold models ===
Granovetter has done research on a model of how fads are created. Consider a hypothetical mob assuming that each person's decision whether to riot or not is dependent on what everyone else is doing. Instigators will begin rioting even if no one else is, while others need to see a critical number of trouble makers before they riot, too. This threshold is assumed to be distributed to some probability distribution. The outcomes may diverge largely although the initial condition of threshold may only differ very slightly. This threshold model of social behavior was proposed previously by Thomas Schelling and later popularized by Canadian journalist Malcolm Gladwell's book The Tipping Point.

=== Security influence ===
Granovetter's work has influenced researchers in capability-based security. Interactions in these systems can be described using "Granovetter diagrams", which illustrate changes in the ties between objects.

=== Publications ===
His publications include:

- Getting A Job: A Study of Contacts and Careers. Cambridge, Mass: Harvard University. 1974. ISBN 978-0-674-35416-6.
- Granovetter, M. (1978). "Threshold Models of Collective Behavior". American Journal of Sociology. 83 (6): 1420–1443. doi:10.1086/226707. JSTOR 2778111. S2CID 49314397.
- Granovetter, M. (1983). "The Strength of Weak Ties: A Network Theory Revisited". Sociological Theory. 1: 201–233. doi:10.2307/202051. JSTOR 202051.

- Reprinted in Marsden, Peter V.; Lin, Nan, eds. (1982). Social Structure and Network Analysis. Sage. ISBN 978-0-8039-1888-7.

- Granovetter, M. (1985). "Economic Action and Social Structure: The Problem of Embeddedness". American Journal of Sociology. 91 (3): 481–510. doi:10.1086/228311. JSTOR 2780199. S2CID 17242802.
- Nohria, Nitin; Eccles, Robert, eds. (1992). "Problems of Explanation in Economic Sociology". Networks and Organizations: Structure, Form, and Action. Boston, Mass: Harvard Business School. ISBN 978-0-87584-324-7.
- Granovetter, M. (2005). "The Impact of Social Structure on Economic Outcomes". Journal of Economic Perspectives. 19: 33–50. doi:10.1257/0895330053147958.
