= Douglas Anderton =

American sociologist and statistician

Douglas L. Anderton is an American sociologist and retired Distinguished Professor at University of South Carolina. He is a Fellow of the American Association for the Advancement of Science, American Statistical Association, Sociological Research Association and International Statistical Institute.
