= Harold Wilensky =

American organizational sociologist

Harold L. Wilensky (March 3, 1923 – October 30, 2011) was an American organizational sociologist, noted among other things for his work on organizational intelligence. He was Professor Emeritus of Political Science at the University of California, Berkeley, a fellow of the American Academy of Arts and Sciences and the author of 13 books and 70 articles.

He was born in New Rochelle, New York, in 1923 and died in Berkeley, California, in 2011.

== Education ==
Wilensky attended Antioch College during 1942 and again 1945–47, where he majored in economics and political science. His collegiate years were interrupted by a term of service in the United States Air Force. Wilensky had been working with many labor unions, and originally went to the University of Chicago for a full-time job doing union leadership training. He ended up attending the University of Chicago for graduate school, completing a PhD in sociology in 1955. When he arrived at Chicago, the person he was replacing suggested he get a degree while he was at the university. He originally planned to continue to study economics. When he went to the economics department to inquire about continuing his education, Milton Friedman, a young assistant professor and graduate advisor, asked him what he'd being reading that would qualify him as an economist. When he responded with Max Weber, John Stuart Mill, Karl Mannheim, Karl Marx, Harold Laski, Thorstein Veblen, and Joseph Schumpeter, Friedman said "You're not an economist, you're a sociologist. You should go upstairs and see the sociologists."

His dissertation was titled: The Staff "expert": A Study of the Intelligence Function in American Trade Unions.

Writing about the Bay of Pigs debacle in his classic work “Organizational Intelligence” (1967), Wilensky wrote that “The more secrecy, the smaller the intelligent audience, the less systematic the distribution and indexing of research, the greater the anonymity of authorship, and the more intolerant the attitude toward deviant views.” He also argued that organizational intelligence benefited from healthy argument and constructive rivalry.

== Works ==
- The Professionalization of Everyone? (University of Chicago Press, 1964).
- With Charles N. Lebeaux. Industrial Society and Social Welfare (Russell Sage, 1958 hb; Free Press Macmillan, 1965 enl. edn.pb)
- Organizational Intelligence: Knowledge and Policy in Government and Industry (Basic Books, 1967,1969)
- The Welfare State and Equality (California, 1975)
- Democratic Corporatism and Policy Linkages (Institute of Governmental Studies, 1987)
- Intellectuals in Labor Unions (Free Press, 1956)
- Rich Democracies: Political Economy, Public Policy, and Performance (University of California Press, 2002).
- American Political Economy in Global Perspective (Cambridge, 2012).
