= Russell Sage Foundation =

Philanthropic foundation that primarily funds research relating to income inequality

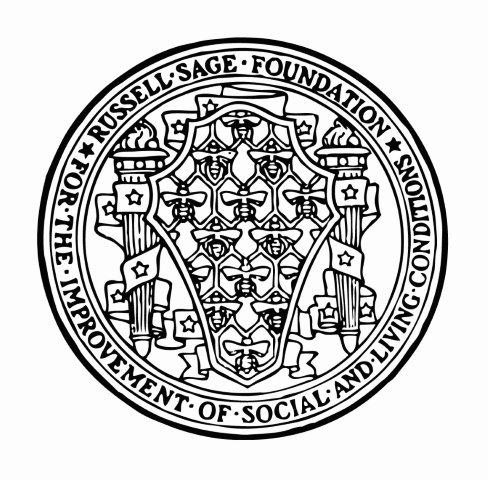
- Founded: 1907; 119 years ago
- Founder: Margaret Olivia Slocum Sage
- Type: Private Foundation
- Location: 112 E. 64th St., Manhattan, New York
- Key people: President – Bruce Western
- Revenue: $46.8 million (2025)
- Expenses: $20.7 million (2025)
- Endowment: $493 million (2025)
- Website: www.russellsage.org

The Russell Sage Foundation is an American non-profit organisation established by Margaret Olivia Sage in 1907 for “the improvement of social and living conditions in the United States.” It was named after her recently deceased husband, railroad executive Russell Sage. The foundation dedicates itself to strengthening the methods, data, and theoretical core of the social sciences to better understand societal problems and develop informed responses. It supports visiting scholars in residence and publishes books and a journal under its own imprint. It also funds researchers at other institutions and supports programs intended to develop new generations of social scientists. The foundation focuses on labor markets, immigration and ethnicity, and social inequality in the United States, as well as behavioral economics. Its current president is the Australian-born American sociologist Bruce Western.

== History ==
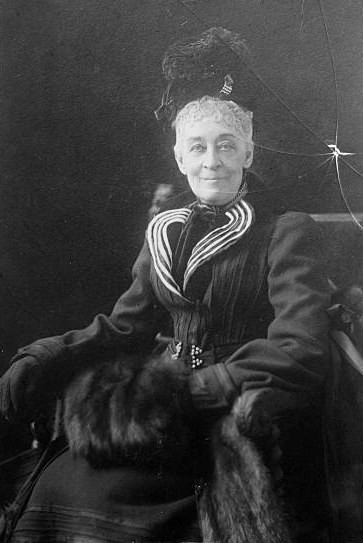
In 1907 Margaret Olivia Slocum Sage started the Russell Sage Foundation...

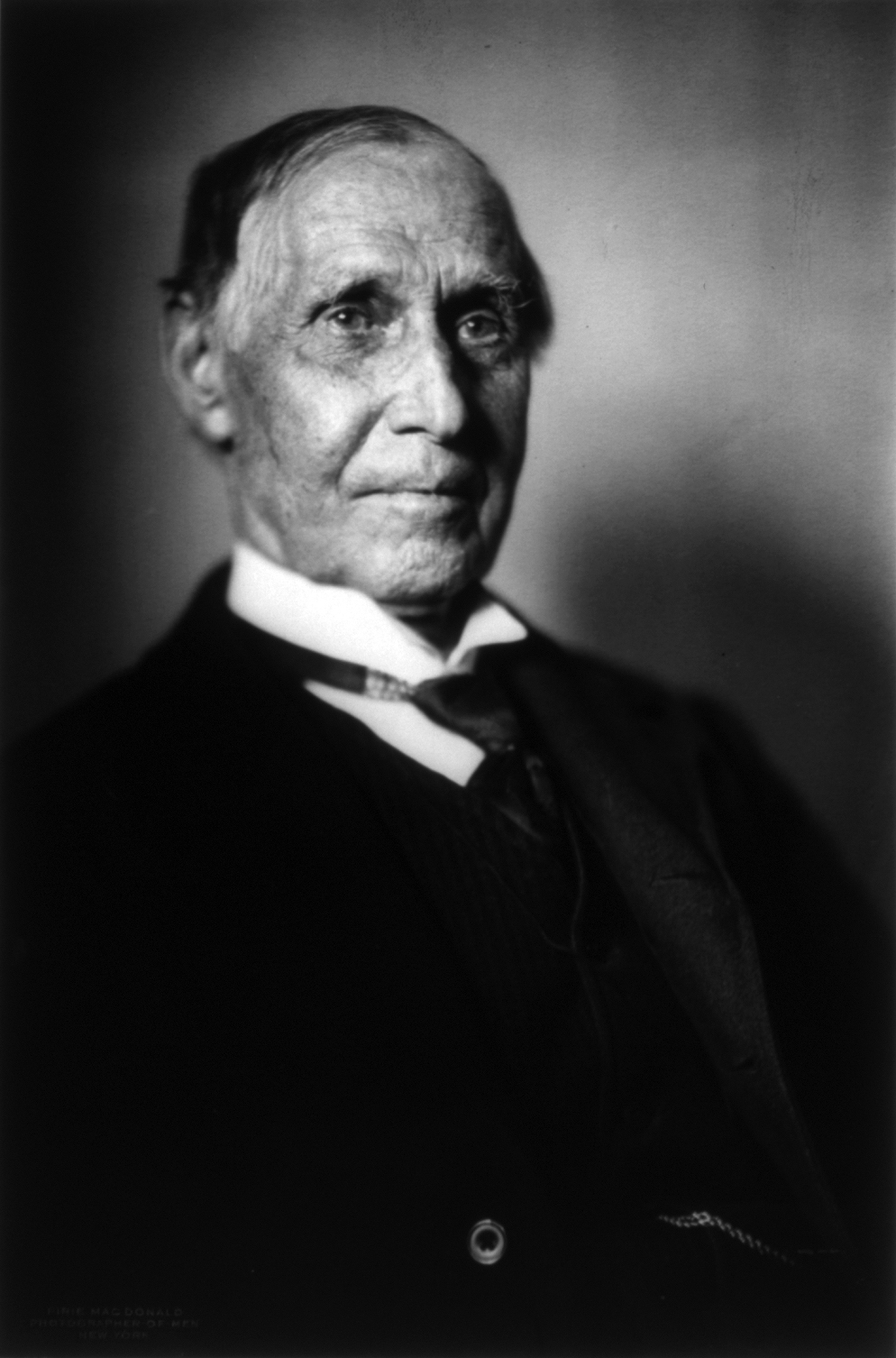
...with the fortune she inherited from her late husband, Russell Sage

The Russell Sage Foundation was established in 1907 for "the improvement of social and living conditions in the United States" by a gift of $10 million from Margaret Olivia Slocum Sage (1828–1918), widow of railroad magnate and financier Russell Sage. Mrs. Sage directed the foundation to pursue its mission through a broad set of activities, including "research, publication, education, the establishment and maintenance of charitable or benevolent activities, agencies and institutions, and the aid of any such activities, agencies, or institutions already in existence."

=== Early years ===
Soon after its establishment, the Foundation played a pioneering role in dealing with problems of the poor and the elderly, in efforts to improve hospital and prison conditions, and in the development of social work as a new profession in the early 20th century. The Foundation was also responsible for early reforms in health care, city planning, consumer credit, labor law, the training of nurses, and social security programs.

In 1907, the foundation funded the Pittsburgh Survey, the first systematic effort to survey working-class conditions in a large U.S. city. Considered a major Progressive Era achievement, the findings inspired labor reforms and helped end twelve-hour days and seven-day weeks for steel workers. During this period, the foundation supported a number of prominent female researchers, such as Mary van Kleeck and Lilian Brandt.

Between 1909 and 1922, the Foundation spent nearly a sixth of its capital to build Forest Hills Gardens, a model suburban community for working families designed by architect Frederick Law Olmsted in Queens, New York. The aim was to demonstrate the economic and social viability of an intelligently planned suburban community. The first lots sold for $800, and a new suburb began thriving by 1917. But with the growth of the New York metro area, housing prices in the new development soon soared beyond the reach of the families they were intended for.

In 1922, the Foundation helped launch the Regional Plan Association to research, write and publish a plan to guide the future development of the New York metropolitan region. In its first 40 years, the Foundation spent more than $1 million on the Regional Survey and Plan. Researchers completed 12 massive volumes as part of the effort, with the first being published in 1928–29. The RPA was not opposed to the growth of the area and its population, but believed that for the development to be efficient and orderly, it had to be properly managed; only in this way could businesses continue to grow and the city maintain its global influence.

The Foundation also provided support for social feminists such as Mary van Kleeck, founder of the International Industrial Relations Institute. Van Kleeck headed up the Foundation's Department of Industrial Studies for four decades, becoming a passionate socialist as a result of her work and research.

=== 1945–1980 ===
Since World War II, the Foundation has devoted its efforts to strengthening the social sciences as a means of achieving more informed and rational social policy. It launched a variety of programs to draw the social sciences closer to decision-makers in other professions, from policymakers to health care providers. This initiative included funds for research on "social indicators", a collection of data that measure the quality of life.

Mary Van Kleeck, who headed the foundation in the late 1940s, was also a member of the American Labor Party. She served on a committee for the Progressive Party in 1948.

In the 1950s, the Foundation supported research on the practice and aims of philanthropy. It established the Foundation Center, a non-profit that maintains data on organized philanthropy. It was also the first to publish The Foundation Directory, a comprehensive listing of the nation's several thousand largest foundations. During this decade, the foundation also received money from the Ford Foundation ($554,000) to support research in the "practical utilization of the behavioral sciences".

In the 1960s and 1970s, the Foundation turned to exploring issues in medical ethics, including patients' rights, the rationale of extreme measures to sustain life that were possible with new technology, and the use of human subjects in research. Foundation-supported books from this period include Bernard Barber's Drugs and Society (1967) and The Dying Patient (1970).

=== 1980s–present ===
The Foundation was an early force in the development of behavioral economics, launching the Behavioral Economics program in 1986 with the Alfred P. Sloan Foundation. Books on behavioral economics published by Russell Sage include Quasi Rational Economics (1991) and Advances in Behavioral Finance (1993).

In 1993, the Foundation also established the Behavioral Economics Roundtable, a group of behavioral economists elected by grantees in the program and charged to design initiatives to advance the field. Three charter members of the Roundtable subsequently received the Nobel Prize in economics: George Akerlof, Daniel Kahneman, and Thomas Schelling.

The Foundation launched new programs to study immigration, the rise of economic inequality, and contact among cultures within the American population. Between 1992 and 2000, the Foundation worked with the Ford Foundation to conduct a Multi-City Study of Urban Inequality. In 2000, the Foundation partnered with the Population Reference Bureau (PRB) to produce The American People: Census 2000, edited by Reynolds Farley of the University of Michigan and John Haaga of PRB.

From 2014 to 2016, the Foundation entered into research collaborations with a number of other foundations on a variety of topics related to its core interests. Co-funders include the Carnegie Corporation; the William T. Grant Foundation; the W.K. Kellogg Foundation; the MacArthur Foundation; the Spencer Foundation; and the Washington Center for Equitable Growth. In 2015 the Foundation partnered with the Robert Wood Johnson Foundation on an initiative exploring the social, economic and political effects of the Affordable Care Act. Also in 2015, the Foundation launched RSF: The Russell Sage Foundation Journal of the Social Sciences, a peer-reviewed, open-access journal of social science research.

== Current activities ==
=== Research ===
The Foundation supports four principal research programs:

- Future of Work, concerned principally with the causes and consequences of changes in the quality of low-wage work in the United States and other advanced economies.
- Race, Ethnicity, and Immigration concerned with the social, economic, and political effects of the changing racial and ethnic composition of the U.S. population, including the transformation of communities and ideas about what it means to be American. This program was developed in 2015 to replace two prior programs, Immigration and Cultural Contact.
- Social, Political, and Economic Inequality, focused on the social effects of rising economic inequality in the U.S., with particular attention to the ways in which the political and educational systems have responded to growing economic disparities.
- Behavioral Economics, which incorporates the insights of psychology and other social sciences into the study of economic behavior.

In addition the Foundation also supports special initiatives on the social, economic and political effects of the Affordable Care Act, Computational Social Science, Decision Making and Human Behavior in Context, Immigration and Immigrant Integration, Integrating Biology and Social Science Knowledge, Non-Standard Work, and an Early Career Behavioral Economics Conference.

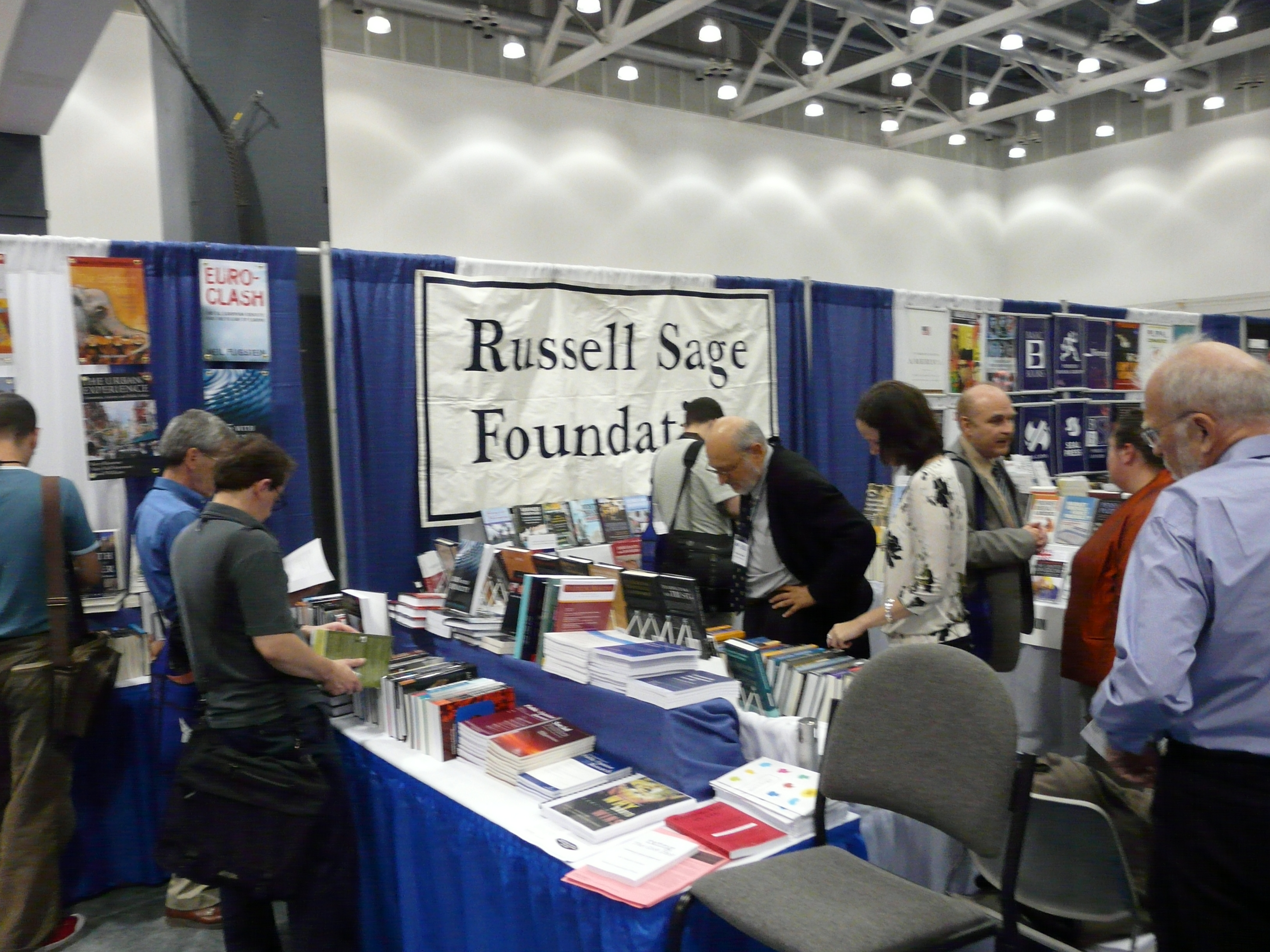
2008 conference booth

=== Books ===
The Foundation publishes books on a variety of subjects, with particular emphasis on work related to its programs. Notable recent publications include Homeward: Life in the Year After Prison by Bruce Western, winner of the 2019 Outstanding Book Award from the Inequality, Poverty, and Mobility Section of the American Sociological Association and winner of the 2018 Choice Outstanding Academic Title; The Long Shadow: Family Background, Disadvantaged Urban Youth, and the Transition to Adulthood, for which authors Karl Alexander, Doris Entwisle, and Linda Olson won the 2016 Grawemeyer Award in Education; The Asian American Achievement Paradox by Jennifer Lee and Min Zhou, winner of three awards from the American Sociological Association and winner of the 2017 Association for Asian American Studies Award for Best Book in the Social Sciences; Unequal Time: Gender, Class, and Family in Employment Schedules, by Dan Clawson and Naomi Gerstel, winner of three awards from the American Sociological Association; and the Government-Citizen Disconnect by Suzanne Mettler, winner of the Alexander L. George Award from the International Society of Political Psychology.

The Foundation also publishes RSF: The Russell Sage Foundation Journal of the Social Sciences, a peer-reviewed, open-access journal of social science research.

The Foundation publishes the American Sociological Association’s distinguished Rose Series in Sociology. Its publications are distributed by the Chicago Distribution Center.

=== Visiting Scholars and Journalists programs ===
The Russell Sage Foundation has established a center where Visiting Scholars can pursue their writing and research. Each year, the Foundation invites a number of scholars to its New York City headquarters to investigate topics in social and behavioral sciences. The Foundation particularly welcomes groups of scholars who wish to collaborate on a specific project during their residence at Russell Sage. Typically Visiting Scholars work on projects related to the Foundation's current programs.

In 2015, the Foundation established a Visiting Journalists program to support journalists undertaking original research on social, political, and economic conditions in the United States.

The Foundation also established the Margaret Olivia Sage Scholars program, which provides the opportunity for distinguished social scientists to spend brief periods in residence at the Russell Sage Foundation, in 2015.

On an occasional basis, the Foundation considers applications for short-term fellowships by scholars who are conducting research relevant to the Foundation's priority areas through its Visiting Researchers program.

==== Robert K. Merton Scholar ====
- In 1990, Robert K. Merton became the first Foundation Scholar at Russell Sage, recognizing his long and invaluable service as an adviser to the administration and a mentor to other visiting scholars.
- In 2000, Nobelist Robert M. Solow became the second Foundation Scholar, following Merton's retirement. In 2003, the position was renamed the Merton Scholar in Merton's honor.

=== Archives ===
The Foundation's archives are located in the Rockefeller Archive Center in Sleepy Hollow, New York.

== Headquarters buildings ==
=== Former Gramercy location ===
When the Foundation was formed, it attempted to locate its offices in the United Charities Building on Park Avenue South and East 22nd Street in Manhattan, but was unable to do so as the building was fully rented; instead, the new foundation spread out to a number of locations in the area. In 1912, Margaret Sage and Robert W. DeForest decided to construct a headquarters building for the Foundation which would also serve as a memorial to her late husband. They engaged Beaux-Arts architect Grosvenor Atterbury, who had designed the Forest Hills Gardens model housing project for the Foundation in 1908, to design the building, and purchased property at 120 East 22nd Street at the corner of Lexington Avenue, just down the street from both United Charities Building and the Church Missions House of the Episcopal Church, and a short block from Gramercy Park. The building, which was originally nine stories before a penthouse was added in the 1920s, was constructed between 1912 and 1913 and altered in 1922–1923. A fifteen-story extension on East 22nd, which Atterbury also designed, connected to the original building with a five-story "hyphen", was added between 1930 and 1931. (Note: The five-story connector building was necessitated by a covenant to the deed for the site, which was sold to the Foundation by the Gramercy Park Hotel. The intention was to preserve access to sunlight for the hotel's north-facing rooms.)

Atterbury's design took the form of a Renaissance Florentine palazzo. Because it was both headquarters for the Foundation and a physical memorial for Sage, the building was more opulently constructed than would generally be the case for a charity. Atterbury utilized expensive materials in the interior, such as rare Kingwood sandstone in the elevators. The 1922-1923 alteration added second floor sculptural panels by Rene Paul Chambellan illustrating the foundation's ideals, goals and deeds.

The Foundation made available space in the main building, at no charge, to other social-service organizations, such as the Family Welfare Association of America, the American Association of Social Workers and the Library of Social Work, which took up the top two floors of the main building. Space in the 22nd Street extension was rented out, and the New York School of Social Work was the primary tenant.

The Foundation sold the building in 1949 to the Archdiocese of New York which used it as the headquarters of Catholic Charities, and it was sold again in 1975, after which it was converted to apartments; it is now called Sage House. The building was designated a New York City landmark in 2000, and is part of a proposed extension to the Gramercy Park Historic District.

=== Current location ===
Since 1981, the Foundation has been headquartered in a Philip Johnson–designed International Style building at 112 East 64th Street between Park and Lexington Avenues, built in 1958–1960 for the Asia Society and Japan Society. The building is in the Upper East Side Historic District.

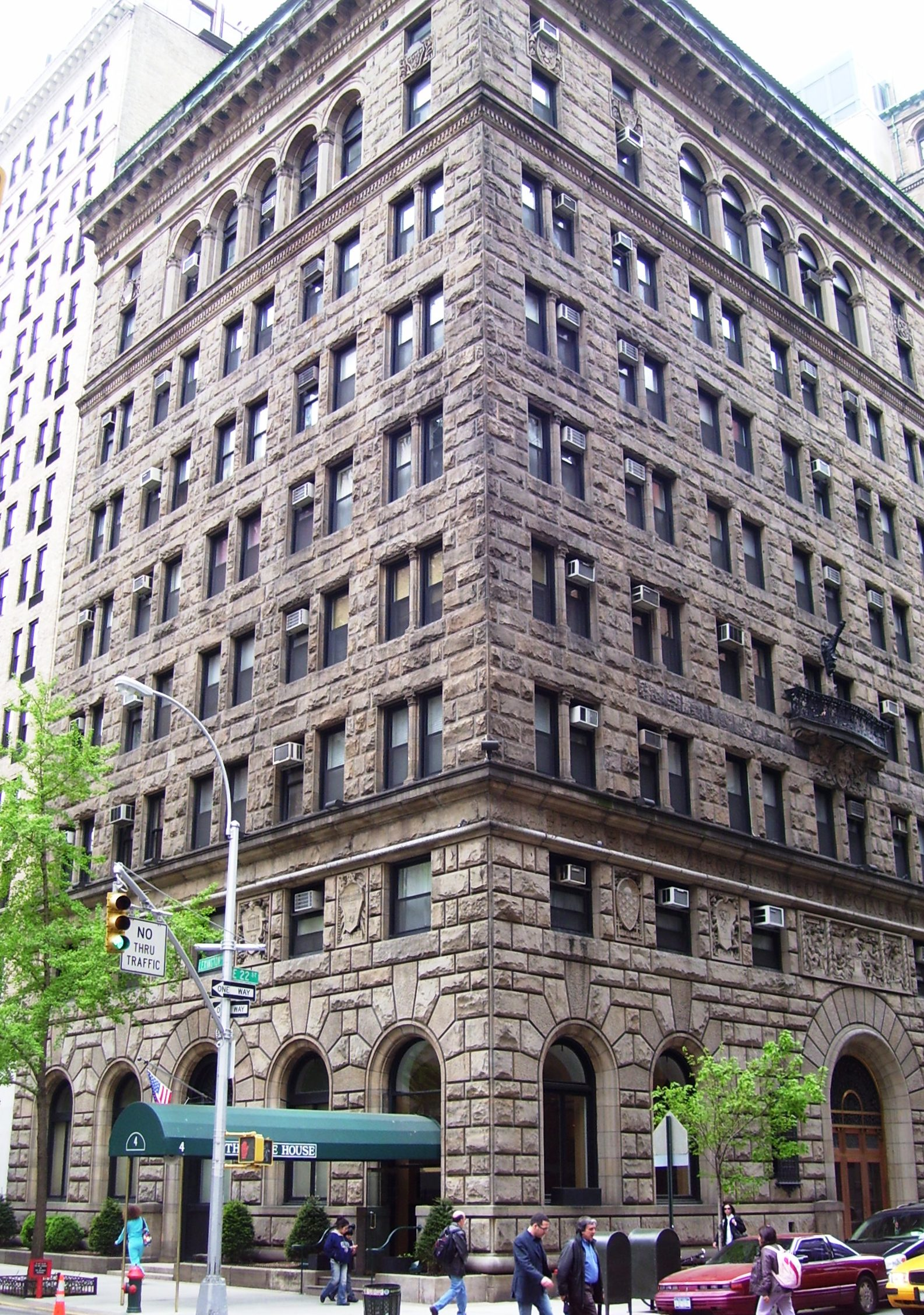
The former headquarters of the Russell Sage Foundation on Lexington Avenue in Manhattan, New York City

The Foundation's current headquarters
