= Pierpaolo Donati =

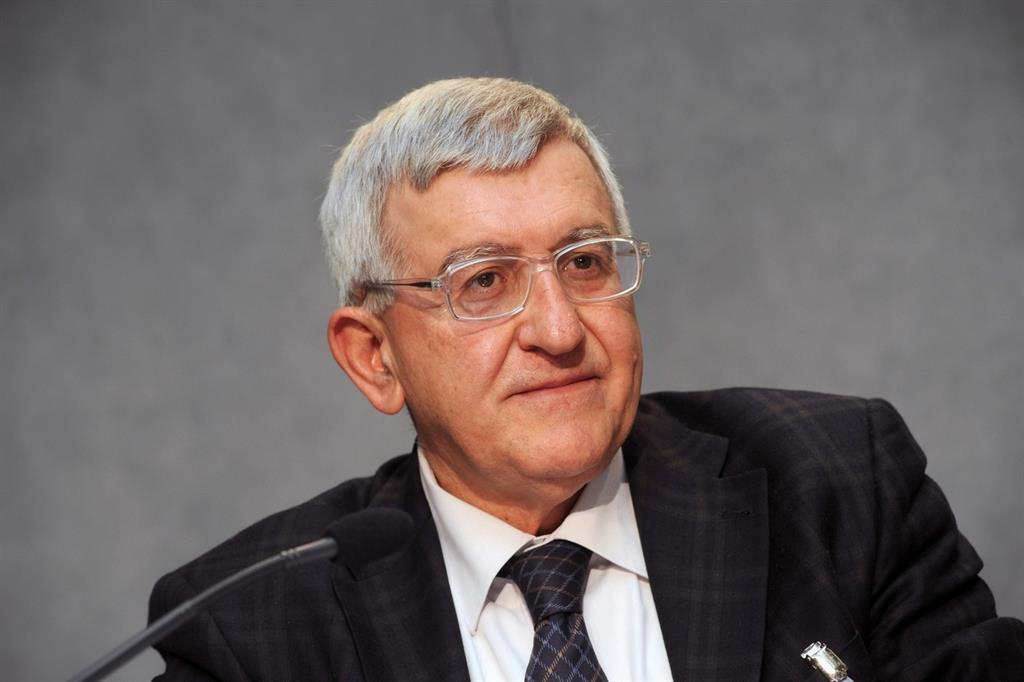
- Born: 30 September 1946 (age 80); Budrio, Italy
- Education: University of Bologna; University of Essex
- Known for: Relational sociology Relational goods Relational feedbacks Critical relational realism
- Scientific career
- Fields: Sociology; Social Theory; Social Policy; Ontology
- Academic advisors: Achille Ardigò; James A. Davis

Pierpaolo Donati (born 30 September 1946) is an Italian sociologist and philosopher of social science, who is considered one of the main exponents of relational sociology and a prominent thinker in relational theory.

== Biography ==
Donati was born in Budrio, a small town of medieval origin 17 km from Bologna (Italy). After high school, he enrolled in the faculty of physics at the University of Bologna, but, after two years, he decided to dedicate himself to the study of society and enrolled in the faculty of Political Sciences in the same university, where he got his M.A. degree in 1970. Then he went to the University of Milan to do a research for the National Research Council Italy (CNR) on Italian entrepreneurship. In the years 1974–1978 he attended the summer school of the ECPR at the University of Essex (UK).

In 1980 he became full professor of sociology. In the years 1970–2016 he taught many different subjects in the fields of sociology, social theory, and social policy, in particular sociology of the family, health, citizenship, welfare, social capital, social services. In the same years, he lectured at the universities of Geneva, Gratz, Harvard, Chicago, Paris Sorbonne, Warsaw, Moscow, Navarra. In the years 1995–1998 he served as President of the Italian Sociological Association, and during the mandate 2001–2005 he served as Counsellor and Auditor of the Board of the International Institute of Sociology.

In 1997 he was appointed member of the Pontifical Academy of Social Sciences as Ordinary Academician. He has received the Doctorate Honoris Causa from the Lateran University (Rome) in 2009 and from the Universitat Internacional de Catalunya (Barcelona) in 2017 for his studies on the family and social policy. Acknowledged by the United Nations as IYF PATRON (1994), in 2009 he has received the San Benedetto Prize for the promotion of Life in Europe and in 2015 the Cheryl Frank Memorial Prize for the book The Relational Subject, Cambridge University Press.

== Works ==
Donati’s research started with the idea of building a useful sociology to reform society according to a humanistic perspective. His writings became a long journey of reflections on the vicissitudes of modernity, its institutions, movements and ideologies, up to claiming that modernity dies and a new, after(not post)-modern society is born.

=== General overview ===
The intention of Donati’s works was to revise the Parsonian theory on society and modernity. It was about building a good theory of society by avoiding Parsons’ mistakes, notably the one to consider a model of society (the North-American one) as the most advanced (therefore the best) in a supposed evolutionary scale. Donati it was necessary to find also a way out of all forms of neo-functionalism, e.g. J.C. Alexander’s and N. Luhmann’s theories.

For Donati, sociological realism should become critical and relational. Donati’s sociology was from its inception an autonomous version of critical realism. Therefore, Donati departed from Parsons' analytical realism in his ‘Introduzione alla sociologia relazionale’ (first edition 1983) and subsequently in ‘Teoria relazionale della società’.

=== Relational society ===
Donati's sociology is oriented to show how a relational society is constantly emerging through a morphogenetic process. To him, society is not a space containing relations, but rather the very tissue of relations (society "is relation" and does not "!have relations"). Relations are necessary, while their form is contingent. That’s why societies can take many different forms. They emerge as a ‘third’ in respect to the agents/actors (the ‘third’ is here understood as the Wechselwirkung according to Georg Simmel).

Any social formation is the emergent effect of reciprocal actions, reiterated over time by social actors/subjects occupying different positions in a societal configuration (system or social network). Society is any social formation generated by virtue of social mechanisms that are relational and reflexive. While the “Relational Subject” is characterized by personal reflexivity (as defined by Margaret Archer), the ‘relational society’ is characterized what Donati calls ‘relational reflexivity’, which is different in kind from the inner reflexivity of the individual.

In other words, each and every society is characterized by a special relation’s form, what Donati calls ‘social molecule’. Modernity has its typical relational form (modern social molecule), and so it is equally for post-modernity (post-modern social molecule). Donati speaks of an after-modern society to indicate a relational society endowed with a new social molecule. The ‘relational society’ is described as a morphogenetic society.

The social relation’s target/goal is to select variations according to the type and degree of relationality that they entail, with a view to producing ‘relational goods’; the means for achieving the goal can be extremely diverse, but they must be such as to allow for the production of relational goods; the after-modern social molecule’s norms promote meta-reflexivity in so far as they involve the search for a non-fungible quality in social relations; the relation’s guiding distinction is its difference in terms of ‘value’, that is, the relation is evaluated on the basis of the meaningful experience that it can offer in contrast to what can be offered by other types of relations. In a nutshell, for Donati this new social molecule gains ground if and to the extent that the primacy of the adaptive function is replaced by the criterion of the cultural value of social relationality. This is the concrete utopia of the “relational society”, which is meant to be subsidiary to the human being. It is subsidiary if and when it develops the virtuous qualities of the human being through proper social relations, i.e. when it configures relations in order to enhance the positively synergetic relationality (instead of humiliation or exploitation) between Ego and Alter. The symbolic code of subsidiarity differentiates itself from other ones (functionalist or of other kind), because it does not confer the primacy to a systemic function, but to the dignity of the human being.

Donati's sociology can be viewed as quite close to the versions based on network analysis (like Nick Crossley's), while it is in radical disagreement with the sociologies that Donati defines as ‘relationalist’ (instead of relational), meaning relativist, pragmatist, processualist, characterized by a flat ontology, like Jan Fuhse’s, François Dépelteau’s, Chris Powell’s and many others. The importance of the ontological perspective goes back to the humanistic interests with which Donati started his journey, and is now reflected in the issue of how to trace the distinctions between the human beings and hybrids, actants, post-humans, trans-humans, smart sentient robots. His perspective must now confront the advent of the digital era with the increasing influence of Artificial Intelligence and Robotics as generator of different kinds of social relations.

In the years 2000-2018 Donati intensified the convergence with critical realism, which he had already adopted since the research of the 1970s, and with the idea of social morphogenesis, applied to topics such as family, business, associations, citizenship, civil society. Being a critical realist, his work has been criticised by other relational sociologists adopting different approaches, such as François Dépelteau and Chris Powell, Gholam Reza Azarian and Jan Fuhse. However Mathieu Deflem asked him for an autobiography for the book ‘Sociologists in a Global Age. Biographical Perspectives’.

In recent years, Donati has pursued the intention of constructing a "relational theory of society" that is clearly distinct from what he calls ‘relationalist sociologies’, meaning those sociologies that profess cultural, ethical relativism and reduce relationships to pure procedural flows. With Simon Laflamme, Doug Porpora and many other sociologists, he insists on the difference between the "relational" approach (which is based on a stratified ontology) and "relationalist" approaches (which support a flat ontology) for social sciences. This difference is the bedrock for new studies on human relations vis-à-vis the spreading of artificial intelligence and robotics.

=== Response ===
François Dépelteau and Christopher Powell have criticized Donati's relational sociology for attributing a structural reality and moral values to social relations, so as to produce an excessively rigid view of the fluid and procedural-transactional nature of social relations. For Gholam Reza Azarian, Donati’s paradigm does not represent a significant contribution that adds something relevant in respect to Harrison White’s relational sociology. Neil Gross reproaches Donati to express an obscure thought. Frédéric Vandenberghe thinks that Donati has not overcome functionalism as he claims (“Donati has produced a counter-manifesto for a critical realist relational sociology with a functionalist hue”) and proposes a way to reconcile Donati’s relational sociology with Dépelteau’s processual sociology.

According to Barry Vaughan, Donati’s relational sociology “is a call to arms, sounding the alarm about the unwelcome effects of many social theories that threaten to drive the human out of the social or else submerge the human within the social and so drown out its distinctive individuality. By placing social relations at the heart of society, he hopes to preserve the uniqueness of both humanity and individual personality.”

Margaret Archer has highlighted the convergences between Roy Bhaskar's critical realism and Donati's relational sociology, and subsequently has debated the place of Donati's sociology within a variety of relational sociologies. Fabio Folgheraiter has applied the relational paradigm of Donati to social work. Other authors have used Donati's theory to explain how to make young people desist from committing crimes.

== Publications ==
- 1986: Introduzione alla sociologia relazionale, FrancoAngeli, Milano, (second enlarged edition) pp. 226
- 1991: Teoria relazionale della società, FrancoAngeli, Milano, pp. 580
- 1999: La cittadinanza societaria, Laterza, Roma-Bari (Spanish translation: La ciudadanía societaria, Editorial Universidad de Granada, Granada)
- 1998: Manuale di sociologia della famiglia, Laterza, Roma-Bari, pp. 484 (Spanish translation: Manual de Sociología de la Familia, Eunsa, Pamplona, 2003)
- 1998: Lezioni di sociologia. Le categorie fondamentali per la comprensione della società, Cedam, Padova
- 2001: Il lavoro che emerge. Prospettive del lavoro come relazione sociale in una economia dopo-moderna, Bollati Boringhieri, Torino
- 2006: Repensar la sociedad. El enfoque relacional, Ediciones Internacionales Universitarias, Madrid, pp. 262
- 2008: Oltre il multiculturalismo. La ragione relazionale per un mondo comune, Laterza, Roma-Bari
- 2009: Teoria relazionale della società: i concetti di base, FrancoAngeli, Milano
- 2010: La matrice teologica della società, Rubbettino, Soveria Mannelli
- 2011: Relational Sociology. A New Paradigm for the Social Sciences, Routledge, London and New York (Chinese translation and edition: 答复: Relational Sociology 格致出版社, Shanghai: Truth and Wisdom Press, 2018)
- 2011: I beni relazionali. Che cosa sono e quali effetti producono, Bollati Boringhieri, Torino
- 2011: Sociologia della riflessività. Come si entra nel dopo-moderno, il Mulino, Bologna
- 2015: L’enigma della relazione, Mimesis Edizioni, Milano-Udine
- 2017: Más allá del multiculturalismo, Ediciones Cristiandad, Madrid
- 2017: (eds. Pierpaolo Donati e Elżbieta Hałas) The Relational Turn in Sociology: Implications for the Study of Society, Culture and Persons, special issue of “Stan Rzeczy” [State of Affairs], University of Warsaw, No. 12
- 2018: (ed. Pierpaolo Donati) Towards a Participatory Society: New Roads to Social and Cultural Integration, The Pontifical Academy of Social Sciences, Libreria Editrice Vaticana, Vatican City, pp. 718 (free online)
- 2018: Sociología relacional de lo humano, Eunsa, Pamplona
- 2019: Реляционная теория общества: социальная жизнь с точки зрения критического реализма, Москва: Москва Издательство ПСТГУ,(Relational theory of society: social life in terms of critical realism), Moscow Publishing PSTGU
- 2019: Scoprire i beni relazionali. Per generare una nuova socialità, Soveria Mannelli
