= Mustafa Emirbayer =

American sociologist

- Born: Detroit, Michigan, U.S.
- Education: University of California, Davis (BA); Harvard University (MA, PhD)
- Known for: Social network analysis, relational sociology
- Awards: Lewis A. Coser Award, Clifford Geertz Award
- Scientific career
- Fields: Sociology
- Workplaces: University of Wisconsin–Madison
- Doctoral advisor: Nathan Glazer
- Other academic advisors: Theda Skocpol, Daniel Bell, David Riesman
- Doctoral students: Matthew Desmond, Mimi Sheller, Jacques Berlinerblau, Shamus Khan, Joseph C. Ewoodzie

Mustafa Emirbayer is an American sociologist and professor of sociology at University of Wisconsin-Madison. He is known for his theoretical contributions to social network analysis, and is "one of the most vocal advocates of the relational approach in the social sciences." In 2009 he won the Lewis A. Coser Award for Theoretical Agenda-Setting from the American Sociological Association.

== Career ==
Emirbayer was born in Detroit, Michigan, to parents of Turkish and Crimean Tatar descent. He also spent part of his childhood in Santa Barbara, California, and his high school years in Mexico City, Mexico. He attended the University of California, Davis and received his BA in psychology (with minors in English and History) in 1980. He originally enrolled in the graduate program in psychology at the University of Michigan, where he first took coursework from the sociologist Charles Tilly. He soon realized that he wanted to study sociology as he felt psychology at the time neglected culture, institutions and history. Emirbayer went on to receive his MA in 1985 and PhD in 1989 from Harvard University, both in sociology. His dissertation was "Moral Education in American, 1830–1990" under the direction of Nathan Glazer (chair), Daniel Bell, David Riesman, and Theda Skocpol.

Emirbayer attended Harvard shortly after the "revolution" in social network analysis, and later at The New School, along with colleagues Charles Tilly and Harrison White, he played a key role in The New York School of relational sociology. In 2015, he became the editor-in-chief of the journal Sociological Theory.

== Major contributions ==
When he was at the New School for Social Research, along with co-author Jeff Goodwin, Emirbayer won the 1994 Clifford Geertz Award for Best Article in Cultural Sociology for the article “Network Analysis, Culture, and the Problem of Agency”.

Inspired by discussions at a series of mini-conferences organized by Harrison White at the Lazarsfeld Center, Emirbayer began to write a systematic statement regarding the "relational turn" he felt was necessary for sociology. In 1997 he published the Manifesto for Relational Sociology in the American Journal of Sociology, which brought various social theorists together under one label.

His most-cited publication, with Ann Mische, is their 1998 article "What is Agency?" In the article, the authors apply "relational pragmatics" to demonstrate the "dynamic interplay" of routine, purpose and judgement in explaining human agency.

In 2009 he was elected to the Chair of the Sociological Theory Section of the American Sociological Association. Also in 2009 he won the Lewis A. Coser Award for Theoretical Agenda-Setting.

In 2014, Emirbayer was a keynote speaker at Yale's Center for Cultural Sociology special conference on "Advancing Cultural Sociology".
