= Ann Mische =

American sociologist (born 1965)

- Born: March 21, 1965 (age 61)
- Education: Yale University (B.A.); The New School for Social Research (Ph.D.)
- Known for: relational sociology, political sociology, organizational sociology, social movements
- Scientific career
- Fields: Sociology
- Workplaces: University of Notre Dame
- Doctoral advisor: Charles Tilly
- Other academic advisors: Ira Katznelson, Harrison White

Ann Mische (born March 21, 1965) is an American sociologist and associate professor of sociology at the University of Notre Dame and a professor of Peace Studies at the Kroc Institute for International Peace Studies. She is particularly known for her contributions to political sociology, relational sociology, social networks, and contentious politics.

== Career ==
Mische graduated from Yale University with a BA in philosophy 1986 and received her MA in 1992 and PhD in 1998 from The New School for Social Research, both in sociology. From 1998 to 1999 she was the coordinator of the Workgroup on Networks, Culture and Social Dynamics, Lazarsfeld Center for the Social Sciences at Columbia University and was co-editor with Charles Tilly of an online pre-print series for the Lazarsfeld Center. From 1987 to 1990, Mische was an Institute of Current World Affairs Fellow for study in Brazil, which set the stage for her doctoral work and first publication. In 1994 she received a Fulbright-Hays Award to continue doctoral dissertation work in Brazil. She completed her dissertation on the political activity of youth activists in Brazil with guidance from Charles Tilly, Ira Katznelson and Harrison White.

From 2001 to 2008, she was the co-editor of journal Social Movement Studies and on the editorial boards of several journals, including Sociological Theory, Qualitative Sociology, American Journal of Sociology. She was chair of the Theory (2007–2008), Political Sociology (2013–14) and Culture (2021–22) sections of the American Sociological Association.

== Contributions ==
Her 2008 publication Partisan Publics: Communication and Contention across Brazilian Youth Activist Networks received an honorable mention for the Best Book Award in Political Sociology from the American Sociological Association. John W. Mohr states that, with this book, "Mische sets a new standard for how to conceptualize the dynamic analysis of an institutional field," and Ronald Breiger contends that "Ann Mische establishes herself at the forefront of research seeking solid foundations for a sociology of action and structure that takes seriously cultural projects and partisanship, networks and narratives, institutions and communicative action, and the creation and demise of publics." Partisan Politics was published in the Princeton University Press' Series: Princeton Studies in Cultural Sociology, which "aims to present for a broad audience a select number of works by the most prominent and the most promising scholars in cultural sociology." The series is edited by Paul J. DiMaggio, Michèle Lamont, Robert J. Wuthnow, and Viviana A. Zelizer.
