= Charles Tilly =

American sociologist (1929–2008)

- Born: May 27, 1929; Lombard, Illinois, U.S.
- Died: April 29, 2008 (aged 78); New York City, U.S.
- Education: Harvard University (AB, PhD)
- Spouse: Louise A. Tilly
- Children: 4
- Scientific career
- Fields: Social Science; Sociology; Political science History
- Workplaces: University of Delaware; Harvard University; University of Toronto; University of Michigan; The New School; Columbia University; Institute for Social and Economic Research and Policy
- Academic advisors: Barrington Moore Jr.
- Doctoral students: Barry Wellman; Ann Mische; Daniel Nexon; John M. Merriman

Charles Tilly (May 27, 1929 – April 29, 2008) was an American sociologist, political scientist, and historian who wrote on the relationship between politics and society. He was a professor of history, sociology, and social science at the University of Michigan from 1969 to 1984 before becoming the Joseph L. Buttenwieser Professor of Social Science at Columbia University.

He has been described as "the founding father of 21st-century sociology" and "one of the world's preeminent sociologists and historians." He published widely across topics such as urban sociology, state formation, democracy, social movements, labor, and inequality. He was an influential proponent of large-scale historical social science research. The title of Tilly's 1984 book, Big Structures, Large Processes, Huge Comparisons, is characteristic of his approach to social science research.

== Early life and education ==
Tilly was born in Lombard, Illinois (near Chicago). His parents were Naneth and Otto Tilly, Welsh-German immigrants. He graduated from York Community High School in 1946. He graduated from Harvard University in 1950 with a Bachelor of Arts magna cum laude. He served in the U.S. Navy as a paymaster of an amphibious squadron during the Korean War. Tilly completed his Doctor of Philosophy in Sociology at Harvard in 1958.

While at Harvard, he was a student in the Department of Social Relations during the "Harvard revolution" in social network analysis. Tilly was a teaching assistant to Pitirim Sorokin, who, along with Talcott Parsons and George C. Homans, was considered by many in the profession to be among the world's leading sociologists. Tilly later recalled Sorokin's characteristically gruff manner, often retorting to Tilly's ideas with "A very good idea, Mr. Tilly, but Plato said it better."

Tilly eventually turned to Barrington Moore Jr. and George C. Homans to supervise his dissertation. But Tilly never failed to say that Sorokin was a great person (even though Tilly eschewed any great person theory of history).

== Academic career ==
Charles Tilly taught at the University of Delaware (1956–1962), Harvard University (1963–1966), the University of Toronto (1965–1969), the University of Michigan (1969–1984), The New School (1984–1996), and Columbia University (1996–2008). At Michigan, Tilly was professor of history 1969–1984, professor of sociology 1969–1981, and the Theodore M. Newcomb Professor of Social Science 1981–1984. At the New School from 1984 to 1996, he was Distinguished Professor of sociology and history, 1984–1990, and University Distinguished Professor, 1990–1996. In 1996, he was the Joseph L. Buttenwieser Professor of Social Science.

Over the course of his career, Tilly wrote more than 600 articles and 51 books and monographs. His most highly cited books are: the edited volume The Formation of National States in Western Europe (1975), From Mobilization to Revolution (1978), Coercion, Capital, and European States, AD 990-1990 (1990), Durable Inequality (1998), and Dynamics of Contention (2001).

== Academic work ==
Tilly's academic work covered multiple topics in the social sciences and influenced scholarship in disciplines outside of sociology, including history and political science. He is considered a major figure in the development of historical sociology, the early use of quantitative methods in historical analysis, the methodology of event cataloging, the turn towards relational and social-network modes of inquiry, the development of process- and mechanism-based analysis, as well as the study of: contentious politics, social movements, the history of labor, state formation, revolutions, democratization, inequality, and urban sociology.

At Columbia, along with Harrison White, Tilly played a key role in the emergence of the New York School of relational sociology.

=== Urban sociology ===
In the 1960s and 1970s, Tilly studied migration to cities, and was an influential theorist about urban phenomena and treating communities as social networks. In 1968, Tilly presented his report on European collective violence to the Eisenhower Commission, a body formed under the Johnson administration to assess urban unrest amidst the Civil Rights Movement. The report was included in Vol. 1 of Violence in America, a collection edited by scholars on the staff of the commission. As informed by his studies of contentious politics in 19th-century Europe, and the present violence in the U.S., his interest in cities and communities became closely linked with his passion for the study of both social movements and collective violence.

=== An approach to the study of societies ===
Tilly outlined the distinctive approach he would use in his research on the state and capitalism in Big Structures, Large Processes, Huge Comparisons (1984).

In this work, he argued against eight common ideas in social theory:

- The view that societies are not connected with each other
- The view that collective behavior can be explained in terms of the mental state of individuals
- The view that societies can be understood as blocs, lacking parts or components
- The view that societies evolve through fixed stages (an assumption common in modernization theory)
- The view that differentiation is a master process, common to all societies as they modernize
- The view that quick differentiation generates disorder
- The view that rapid social change causes behaviors that are not considered normal, such as crime
- The view that "illegitimate" and "legitimate" kinds of conflict originate in different processes

On the positive side, he argued in favor of "historically grounded huge comparisons of big structures and large processes", while being careful to consider the temporal and spatial context of explanations. The approach Tilly laid out has sometimes been called historical sociology or comparative historical analysis. More substantively, Tilly sketched a research program focused on two broad macro processes, capitalism development and the formation of modern states.

=== Social movements and contentious politics ===
One of the themes that runs through a large number of Tilly's work is the collective actions of groups that challenge the status quo. Tilly dedicated two books, on France and Great Britain, to the topics: The Contentious French. Four Centuries of Popular Struggle (1986) and Popular Contention in Great Britain, 1758–1834 (1995).

Later on, he co-authored two influential books on social movements: Dynamics of Contention (2001), with Doug McAdam and Sidney Tarrow; and Contentious Politics (2006) with Sidney Tarrow. Tilly also provided an overview of social movement, from their origins in the eighteen century to the early twenty-first century, in Social Movements, 1768-2004 (2004).

Tilly argues that social movements were a novel phenomenon that emerged in the West in the mid-nineteenth century and that social movements are characterized by three features: (1) a campaign - a "sustained, organized public effort" aimed at making collective demands from public authorities; (2) a repertoire of contention - the use of various forms of action, such as public meetings, demonstrations, and so on; and (3) a public display of certain qualities, specifically worthiness, unity, numbers, and commitment (WUNC).

In his work with McAdam and Tarrow, Tilly seeks to advance a new agenda for the study of social movements. First, he and his co-authors claim that various of forms of contention politics, including revolutions, ethnic mobilization, democratization should be connected to each other. Second, he argued for an analysis that puts the focus squarely on causal mechanisms and that the goal of research should be the identification of "recurrent mechanisms and processes." Specifically, in Dynamics of Contention Tilly and his co-authors focus on mechanism such as brokerage, category formation, and elite defection.

=== State formation ===
Tilly's 1975 edited volume The Formation of National States in Western Europe was influential in the state formation literature. Tilly’s predatory theory of the state steps away from smaller scale internal conflicts between citizens themselves. In “War Making and State Making as Organized Crime”, Tilly describes the sovereign as dishonest, as ”governments themselves commonly simulate, stimulate, or even fabricate threats of external war”. The government sells the pretense of security to its citizens at their own expense, forcing compliance of its own people in exchange for protection from itself. As a critic of government intentions, Tilly “warns against the contractual model”, with the belief that states of war are “our largest examples of organised crime”. On Tilly’s perspective, Stanford historian David Laboree says there are similarities between the collective monetary actions and enemy-related dealings of kings and pirates; the state’s legitimacy comes from convincing residents that there is more value in protection than the taxes being commandeered. As summarized by Prof. Mehrdad Vahabi of Tilly’s belief, the role of the state is protective in enhancement of production and predatory by way of “coercive extraction”.

In the pre-1400s era predating an understood national budget, the primary revenue collection method of European “commercialized states” was through “tribute, rents, dues, and fees”. As the number of European states involved in conflict in a given year increased from the 16th century, war-driven reasoning underlaid development and regularization of long-term state budgets. The lasting geographical influence on today’s Europe is a direct descendant of strategies feudalistic rulers employed to enjoy the fullest extent of the territory they presided- namely through resource extraction that permitted making war, developing territories, and removing threats against the land. Tributes were extracted from defeated opponents, and a surviving political organization inevitably formed from necessary tax collection and enforcement.

Tilly's theory of state formation is considered dominant in the state formation literature. Some scholars have found support for Tilly's theory, both for European states and globally. An article that examines pre- and post- French Revolution Europe that is in support of Tilly’s explanation of war as a dominant factor of state formation admits that there exist several critiques. Other scholars have disputed his theory. Castellani writes that Tilly fails to account for “improvement of artillery…[and] the expansion of commerce and the production of capital” as other significant factors in state formation outside of pure vanquish. Taylor finds evidence, using bellicist data, that Afghanistan is an example of a country in which war has been a critical destroyer of the state. They add more nuance to Tilly’s saying “war made the state” and conclude that core populations and revolutions are also characteristics. He has also been criticized for not specifying what he considers to be a state.

Tilly's work on state formation was influenced by Otto Hintze, as well as Tilly's long-time friend Stein Rokkan. According to Tilly, through war-making the state is able to monopolize physical violence, enabling the state to title any other entity practicing violence as unlawful. Tilly's theories however have been claimed to hold a Eurocentric syntax, as such a monopolization did not take place in the post-colonial world due to the heavy interference of foreign actors.

=== Democracy and democratization ===
Tilly wrote several books on democracy late in his career. These include Contention and Democracy in Europe, 1650-2000 (2004) and Democracy (2007).

In these works, Tilly argued that political regimes should be evaluated in terms of four criteria:

- Breadth: the extent to which citizens enjoy rights
- Equality: the extent of inequality within the citizenry
- Protection: the extent to which citizens are protected from arbitrary state action
- Mutually binding consultation: the extent to which state agents are obligated to deliver benefits to citizens

The more a regime had these qualities, the more democratic it is.

In his work on democracy, Tilly showed an interest in exploring the link between state capacity and democratization. He distinguished between different paths countries followed, based on whether they developed state capacity before, at the same time, or after they democratized. He concluded that powerful states can block or subvert democracy, and that weak states run the danger of civil war and fragmentation. Thus, he thought that a middle path, in which steps to build the state and democracy were matched, as exemplified by the United States, is the more feasible one.

== Awards and honors ==
External videos
- Charles Tilly interview: origins, Vendee 1 - part of interview with Charles Tilly by Daniel Little, at University of Michigan - Dearborn, December 15, 2007.
- Charles Tilly interview: origins, Vendee 2 - part of interview with Charles Tilly by Daniel Little, at University of Michigan - Dearborn, December 15, 2007.
- Charles Tilly interview: causal mechanisms - part of interview with Charles Tilly by Daniel Little, at University of Michigan - Dearborn, December 15, 2007.
- Charles Tilly interview: concepts and state formation - part of interview with Charles Tilly by Daniel Little, at University of Michigan - Dearborn, December 15, 2007.
- Charles Tilly interview: new issues in historical sociology - part of interview with Charles Tilly by Daniel Little, at University of Michigan - Dearborn, December 15, 2007.
- Charles Tilly interview: social science "paradigm" - part of interview with Charles Tilly by Daniel Little, at University of Michigan - Dearborn, December 15, 2007.
- Charles Tilly interview: individualism and cognitive science - part of interview with Charles Tilly by Daniel Little, at University of Michigan - Dearborn, December 15, 2007.
- Charles Tilly interview: big questions - part of interview with Charles Tilly by Daniel Little, at University of Michigan - Dearborn, December 15, 2007.

Tilly received several awards, including:

- Fellow of the Center for Advanced Study in the Behavioral Sciences in 1968–1969 and 1997-1998.
- National Academy of Sciences in 1972
- The Guggenheim Fellowship in 1974
- American Academy of Arts and Sciences in 1975
- The Common Wealth Award of Distinguished Service in sociology in 1982
- Fellow, German Marshall Fund of the United States (1983-1984)
- The European Amalfi Prize for Sociology and Social Sciences in 1994; for European Revolutions (1942-1992)
- The Eastern Sociological Society's Merit Award for Distinguished Scholarship in 1996
- Member of the American Philosophical Society in 2002
- The American Sociological Association's Career of Distinguished Scholarship Award in 2005
- The International Political Science Association's Karl Deutsch Award in Comparative Politics in 2006
- The Phi Beta Kappa Sidney Hook Memorial Award in 2006
- The Social Science Research Council's Albert O. Hirschman Award in 2008

He also received honorary doctorates from Erasmus University of Rotterdam in 1983, the Institut d'Etudes Politiques of University of Paris in 1993, the University of Toronto in 1995, the University of Strasbourg in 1996, the University of Geneva in 1999, the University of Crete in 2002, the University of Quebec at Montreal in 2004 and the University of Michigan in 2007.

He was awarded the Chevalier de l'Ordre des Palmes Académiques (Knight of the Order of Academic Palms) by the French government.

In 2001, Columbia's sociology graduate students named Tilly the Professor of the Year.

The Charles Tilly Award for Best Book, of the Collective Behavior and Social Movements section of the American Sociological Association was names after Tilly in 1986.

The Charles Tilly Best Article Award has been awarded by the Section on Comparative and Historical Sociology of the American Sociological Association since 2005.

After his death, numerous special journal issues, conferences, awards and obituaries appeared in his honor. The Social Science Research Council hosted a 2008 conference, co-sponsored with Columbia University and the Institute for Social and Economic Research and Policy, in his honor: "A Celebration of the Life and Works of Charles Tilly" At this conference the SSRC announced the Charles Tilly and Louise Tilly Fund for Social Science History. The conference had presentations from notable sociologists including: Craig Calhoun, Harrison White, Doug McAdam, Immanuel Wallerstein, William Sewell, Jack Goldstone, Sidney Tarrow, Barry Wellman and Viviana Zelizer. A 2010 special issue of Social Science History was dedicated to (the work of) Charles Tilly, as was a 2010 special issue of The American Sociologist. The latter was edited by Andreas Koller, and included contributions by George Steinmetz, Neil Gross, Jack A. Goldstone, Kim Voss, Rogers Brubaker, Mustafa Emirbayer, and Viviana Zelizer. In 2010, the journal Theory and Society also published a special issue on "Cities, States, Trust, and Rule" dedicated to the work of Tilly.

== Death ==
Charles Tilly died in the Bronx on April 29, 2008, from lymphoma. As he was fading in the hospital, he got one characteristic sentence out to early student Barry Wellman: "It's a complex situation." In a statement after Tilly's death, Columbia University president Lee C. Bollinger stated that Tilly "literally wrote the book on the contentious dynamics and the ethnographic foundations of political history". Adam Ashforth of The University of Michigan described Tilly as "the founding father of 21st-century sociology".

== See also ==
- Contentious politics
- New institutionalism
- Historical institutionalism
- Historical sociology
- State formation
- Annales School
- Perry Anderson
- Giovanni Arrighi
- Norbert Elias
- Erving Goffman
- Eric Hobsbawn
- Michael Mann (sociologist)
- Barrington Moore Jr.
- Stein Rokkan
- Sidney Tarrow
- E. P. Thompson
- Theda Skocpol
- Immanuel Wallerstein

== Partial bibliography ==
- The Vendée: A Sociological Analysis of the Counter-revolution of 1793 (1964)
- "Collective Violence in European Perspective." Pp. 4–45 in Violence in America: Historical and Comparative Perspectives. A report to the National Commission on the Causes and Prevention of Violence. Volume 1. Eds. Hugh Davis Graham and Ted Robert Gurr. (1969)
- "Clio and Minerva." Pp. 433–66 in Theoretical Sociology, eds. John McKinney and Edward Tiryakian. (1970)
- "Do Communities Act?" Sociological Inquiry 43: 209–40. (1973)
- An Urban World. (ed.) (1974).
- The Formation of National States in Western Europe (ed.) (1975)
- From Mobilization to Revolution (1978)
- As Sociology Meets History (1981)
- Big Structures, Large Processes, Huge Comparisons (1984)
- War Making and State Making as Organized Crime, In Bringing the State Back In, edited by Peter Evans, et al., 169–87. Cambridge, UK: Cambridge University Press, 1985, PDF Online
- The Contentious French (1986)
- Coercion, Capital, and European States, AD 990–1990 (1990)
- Coercion, Capital, and European States, AD 990–1992 (1992)
- European Revolutions, 1492–1992 (1993)
- Cities and the Rise of States in Europe, A.D. 1000 to 1800 (1994)
- Popular Contention in Great Britain, 1758–1834 (1995)
- Roads from Past to Future (1997)
- Work Under Capitalism (with Chris Tilly, 1998)
- Durable Inequality (1998)
- Transforming Post-Communist Political Economies (1998)
- Dynamics of Contention (with Doug McAdam and Sidney Tarrow) (2001)
- The Politics of Collective Violence (2003)
- Contention & Democracy in Europe, 1650–2000 (2004)
- Social Movements, 1768–2004 (2004)
- From Contentions to Democracy (2005)
- Identities, Boundaries, and Social Ties (2005)
- Trust and Rule (2005)
- Why? (2006)
- Oxford Handbook of Contextual Political Analysis (2006)
- Contentious Politics (with Sidney Tarrow) (2006)
- Regimes and Repertoires (2006)
- Democracy (2007)
- Credit and Blame (2008)
- Contentious Performances (2008)
- Social Movements, 1768–2008, 2nd edition (with Lesley Wood, 2009)
