= Relational sociology =

Relational sociology is a collection of sociological theories that emphasize relationalism over substantivalism in explanations and interpretations of social phenomena and is most directly connected to the work of Harrison White and Charles Tilly in the United States and Pierpaolo Donati and Nick Crossley in Europe.

== Overview ==
Relational sociology draws on a perspective or social ontology that Tilly and Donati refer to as relational realism or "the doctrine that transactions, interactions, social ties and conversations constitute the central stuff of social life." (Although, Donati argues that other relational sociologies based on constructivist ontology are not truly relational realism.) This redefines the object of sociology, as Donati argues: "Society is not a space “containing” relations, or an arena where relations are played. It is rather the very tissue of relations (society “is relation” and does not “have relations”). Although several relational thinkers emerge throughout human thought, these presumably disparate theoretical ideas were consolidated in the United States under one banner during what some, following Ann Mische, refer to as The New York School of relational sociology in the 1990s. The Canadian Sociological Association has referred to it as the "relational turn" in social sciences spreading around the world.

While substantivalism (similar to substantialism in philosophy) tends to view individuals (or other social objects) as self-subsistent or self-acting entities, relationalism underscores that practices constitute individuals, and that all action is always trans-action, always with implication transcending the momentary intent. This distinction is frequently cited by Pierre Bourdieu who borrowed it from Ernest Cassirer, specifically, Cassirer's 1923 publication Substance and Function. Overall, "relational theorists reject the notion that one can posit discrete, pre-given units such as the individual or society as ultimate starting points of sociological analysis."

== History ==
In Mustafa Emirbayer's 1997 "Manifesto for a Relational Sociology" he traces the tradition of privileging relations over substances to the pre-Socratic, Greek philosopher Heraclitus. He is attributed the cryptic saying "Ever-newer waters flow on those who step into the same rivers," from which the simpler "everything flows" (Panta rhei) emerges. Among the classical sociologists, Emirbayer and sociologist Marion Fourcade agree that relational ideas emerge in the work of several founders of sociology, including Marx, Weber, Durkheim, Mead, and Simmel. Among early and mid-20th century sociologists, the most prominently relational theorists are John Dewey, Arthur F. Bentley, Pierre Bourdieu, Norbert Elias, and Niklas Luhmann. Pierpaolo Donati contends that Simmel, specifically the concept Wechselwirkung, is "the first one to give sociology the "relational turning point." Donati's own "Manifesto" for his own variety of relational sociology was first published in 1983 in Italian, entitled Introduzione alla sociologia relazionale. In 1992, the French sociologist Guy Bajoit authored "Pour une sociologie relationnelle," which is contemporary with the relational movement in American sociology, but is only engaged, briefly, by Donati's relational sociology.

=== The New York School ===
Following Ann Mische, some refer to the emergence of the relational turn in American sociology in the 1990s as the New York School, as several New York universities were involved in the convergence of two maturing and previously discrete sub-fields in sociology: cultural sociology and social network analysis. Key relational thinkers were concentrated during this time at the Paul F. Lazarsfeld Center for the Social Sciences at Columbia University, as well as the Graduate Faculty of the New School for Social Research and New York University. These sociologists included Harrison White, Charles Tilly, Mustafa Emirbayer, David Gibson, Ronald Burt, Mimi Sheller, Jeff Goodwin, Ann Mische and Melissa Fischer. During the 1990s New York was the site of many conferences and workshop discussing relational ideas: Harrison White hosted several conferences at the Lazersfeld Center discussing the themes of time, language, identities, and networks; Charles Tilly hosted the Workshop on Contentious Politics; and Mustafa Emirbayer organized a study group on Theory and Culture at the New School which discussed early drafts of his Manifesto for Relational Sociology. A 2008 symposium cited White's Identity and Control, Mische's Partisan Publics, Tilly's Contentious Politics in Great Britain, 1758–1834, Bearman's Relations into Rhetorics, and Gould's Insurgent Identities as "milestones in Relational Sociology." All but Gould played a direct role in the New York School.

=== Spread of relational sociology ===
In September 2008, the Humboldt University of Berlin hosted an international symposium on relational sociology organized by Jan Fuhse titled Relational Sociology: Transatlantic Impulses for the Social Sciences. The symposium centered on the work of Harrison White. In addition to White, presenters included: John Levi Martin, Patrik Aspers, Eiko Ikegami, Ann Mische, Stephan Fuchs and Sophie Muetzel.

In October 2009, sociologist Yanjie Bian hosted the International Conference on Relational Sociology at the Institute for Empirical Social Science Research of Xi'an Jiaotong University. The conference included keynote speakers Nan Lin and Peter Li.

In 2010, the University of California-Davis hosted a conference on relational work, organized by Fred Block, which resulted in a special issue on Relational Work in Market Economics in Politics & Society. Relational work is a sociological concept created by a relational economic sociologist, Viviana Zelizer. This conference included the work of Frederick Wherry, Jennifer Haylett, Sarah Quinn, Josh Whitford and Nina Bandelj.

Italian sociologist Pierpaolo Donati is one of the founders of relational sociology in Europe and published Relational Sociology: A New Paradigm for the Social Sciences in 2011. Also in 2011, British sociologist Nick Crossley published Towards Relational Sociology.

Beginning in 2011, the Canadian Sociological Association has held meetings at every annual conference to develop a research cluster devoted to relational sociology. The most recent meeting was organized by François Dépelteau and Chris Powell from the Laurentian University and Ryerson University.

A 2013 call for papers from the Sociological Network Research section of the German Sociological Association argues that, while major methodological advances occurred in the United States, relational sociology has strong roots in the German-language tradition of sociology. In addition to Simmel, Marx, Elias and Luhmann, such German relational sociologists include: Leopold von Wiese, Karl Mannheim, Theodor Litt, Alfred Schütz, and Helmuth Plessner. The invitation was for oral presentations which addressed scholars who are part of the German-language tradition of relational sociology.

Also in 2013, two books were published on relational sociology by F. Dépelteau and C. Powell. Conceptualizing Relational Sociology and Applying Relational Sociology, both published with Palgrave Macmillan, are collections of texts presenting the variety of the last theoretical and empirical researches done within this intellectual current.

In 2014, a research cluster on relational cluster was created through the Canadian Sociological Association.

The Palgrave Handbook of Relational Sociology was published in 2018. All together it consists of 33 chapters.

Recent years has seen the development of a relational approach to organizational theory in education by Scott Eacott, best captured in "Beyond Leadership: A Relational Approach to Organizational Theory in Education".

== Criticisms ==
Sociologist Richard Swedberg, argues that relational sociology disregards the potential role that interests play in social action:

In several types of modern sociology ... interests are seen as having no or little influence on what is happening. According to so-called relational sociology, for example, it is old fashioned and wrong to explain things through 'substances' (such as interests); everything should be seen in terms of relations, and only relations can be used to explain.

— Richard Swedberg, Interests 2005 p. 4.

Sociologist Christian Smith states in What is a Person? that he rejects Emirbayer's position that substantialism and relationalism represent fundamentally different points of view, rather:

... pure relationality cannot and does not create objects. Relations need substances and substances need relations. All that exists and every way it works requires relations and substances.

— Christian Smith, What is a Person? 2010 p. 232.
