= Frederick Wherry =

American sociologist

Frederick F. Wherry
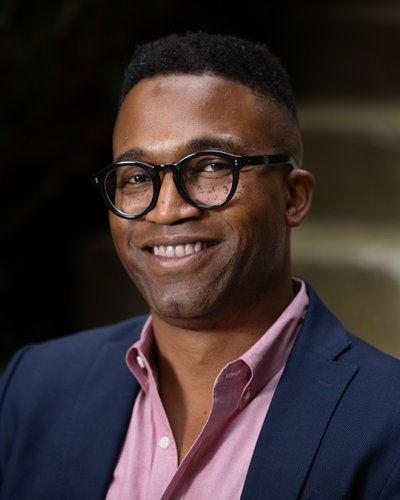
- Education: University of North Carolina at Chapel Hill (B.A.); Princeton University (M.P.A.) (Ph.D.)
- Known for: Economic sociology, relational sociology, cultural sociology,
- Scientific career
- Fields: Sociology
- Workplaces: Princeton University
- Doctoral advisor: Alejandro Portes, Viviana A. Zelizer

Frederick Wherry is an American sociologist. He is the Townsend Martin, Class of 1917 Professor of Sociology at Princeton University, the 2021 president-elect of the Eastern Sociological Society, and is also the Director of the Dignity and Debt Network, a partnership between the Social Science Research Council and Princeton.

Wherry earned a doctorate from Princeton University in 2004 and a Masters in Public Affairs (MPA) from the Princeton School of Public and International Affairs (formerly the Woodrow Wilson School of Public and International Affairs) in 2000. While pursuing the MPA, Wherry was awarded the Wardell Robinson Moore Award for his work on diversity and inclusion.

Wherry taught at the University of Pennsylvania, the University of Michigan, Columbia University, and Yale University before joining the Princeton faculty. He has also served as a consultant for The World Bank in the Office of the Vice-President for East Asia and the Pacific, Social Policy and Governance.

Wherry has contributed opinion pieces to The New York Times. In the fall of 2020, he began teaching a free, public course via YouTube, entitled "Sociology 102: Police Violence, #BlackLivesMatter and the Covid-19 Pandemic."

== Selected publications ==
- 2019. Credit Where It's Due: Rethinking Financial Citizenship (with Kristin Seefeldt and Anthony Alvarez)
- 2017. Money Talks: Explaining How Money Really Works (Edited by Nina Bandelj, Frederick F. Wherry, and Viviana A. Zelizer)
- 2011. The Philadelphia Barrio: The Arts, Branding, and Neighborhood Transformation
