= John Mohr =

John Mohr may refer to:

- John W. Mohr (1956–2019), American sociologist
- John P. Mohr (1910–1997), administrator with the US Federal Bureau of Investigation
