= John W. Mohr =

John Mohr
- Born: 1956 (age 69–70)
- Died: August 24, 2019
- Education: University of California, Irvine (B.A.); Yale University (Ph.D.)
- Known for: Cultural sociology, organizational sociology, institutional analysis
- Awards: Clifford Geertz Award
- Scientific career
- Fields: Sociology
- Workplaces: University of California-Santa Barbara

John W. Mohr (1956–2019) was an American sociologist and Professor of Sociology at University of California-Santa Barbara. He was widely cited in the subfields of the sociology of culture, organizational sociology, institutional analysis, and social network analysis. His focus was on "developing applications of formal methods of relational (network) analysis to the study of discourse in institutional systems." He was considered a "pioneer in modeling cultural forms," and in 1996, he won the Clifford Geertz Award for Best Article in Cultural Sociology.

== Career ==
He earned a B.A. in philosophy in 1978 and MA in comparative culture from University of California, Irvine in 1979. In 1983 he received a MA and PhD in 1992 from Yale University, both in sociology. He began his academic career at University of California-Santa Barbara as an assistant professor in 1991, and promoted to associate professor in 1997 and full professor in 2010. From 2008 to 2012 he was associate director for the Institute for Social, Behavioral, and Economic Research at the University of California-Santa Barbara. He has also been a visiting professor at the Sapienza University of Rome and Maison des Sciences de L'Homme in Paris

He was on the editorial boards of the several social sciences journals, including: Theory and Society, Sociological Theory, American Journal of Cultural Sociology, and Poetics.

== Major contributions ==
In 1996 Mohr's article "Soldiers, Mothers, Tramps and Others: Discourse Roles in the 1907 New York City Charity Directory," won the Clifford Geertz Award for Best Article in Cultural Sociology.

His 1997 article, with Francesca Guerra-Pearson, "The Impact of State Intervention in the Nonprofit Sector: The Case of the New Deal," won the Annual Outstanding Article Award from the Association for Research on Nonprofit Organizations and Voluntary Action.

In 2002 he was elected to the chair of the Culture Section of the American Sociological Association, and in 2014 he was a Distinguished University Visiting Fellow at The New School for Social Research.

Mohr, along with Amin Ghaziani, organized a 2012 symposium at the University of British Columbia focused on measuring culture which resulted in a special issue of Theory and Society also edited by Mohr and Ghaziani. Contributors included: Terence E. McDonnell, Ashley Mears, Stephen Vaisey, Andrew Miles, Iddo Tavory, Roger Friedland, Omar Lizardo, Frederick F. Wherry, Christopher A. Bail and Ann Mische. Their efforts culminated in the 2020 book Measuring Culture coauthored by Morh, Bail, Margaret Frye, Jennifer C. Lena, Lizardo, McDonnell, Mische, Tavory, and Wherry.
