= David Rothman =

David Rothman may refer to:

- David Rothman (medical historian)
- David Rothman (statistician)
