= Funk This (George Porter Jr. album) =

Album by George Porter

Studio album by George Porter Jr. and Runnin Pardners
- Released: 1997
- Genre: Funk
- Label: Transvideo Productions; CTV2112
- Producer: George Porter Jr. and David Stocker

Funk This is an album from New Orleans funk group George Porter Jr. and Running Pardners. It was released in 1997.

== Track listing ==
All tracks composed by George Porter Jr. except where indicated

1. "Timekeeper"
2. "Sweetness" (Brint Anderson)
3. "Bone Funk" (Eddie Tebbe, G. Porter Jr.)
4. "Mam Didn't Raise No Fool" (B. McDonald, G. Porter Jr.)
5. "Mo' 2 Come"

== Personnel ==
- Brint Anderson – Guitar and Vocals
- Jeffrey Alexander – Drums and Vocals
- John Gros – Keyboards
- Tracy Griffin – Trumpet
- Mark Mullins – Trombone
- Brian Graber – Tenor and Soparano sax
