= DiPrete =

DiPrete is a surname. Notable people with the surname include:

- Edward D. DiPrete (1934-2025), American governor of Rhode Island
- Thomas A. DiPrete (born 1950), American sociologist
