= Matthew Connelly =

American history professor (born 1967)

- Awards: George Louis Beer Prize (2002)

Academic background
- Education: Columbia University (BA); Yale University (PhD)
- Doctoral advisor: Gaddis Smith; Paul Kennedy; William Quandt

Academic work
- Discipline: International history
- Institutions: University of Michigan; Columbia University

Matthew James Connelly (born November 25, 1967) is an American professor of international and global history at Columbia University. His areas of expertise include the global Cold War, official secrecy, population control, decolonization, and methods to predict catastrophic threats. He is the author of Fatal Misconception: The Struggle to Control World Population, A Diplomatic Revolution: Algeria's Fight for Independence and the Origins of the Post-Cold War Era, The Declassification Engine: What History Reveals About America's Top Secrets, and articles on international and domestic politics for The Atlantic Monthly, The New York Times, The National Interest, and Le Monde. Connelly is also the founder and principal investigator of History Lab.

== Career ==
Matthew Connelly earned his BA in history from Columbia University in 1990, before earning his doctorate from Yale University in 1997. His dissertation, “The Algerian War for Independence: An International History”, written under the supervision of Gaddis Smith, Paul Kennedy, and William Quandt, formed the basis for A Diplomatic Revolution. Prior to his appointment at Columbia University, he taught in the Department of History and Gerald R. Ford School of Public Policy at the University of Michigan. He has also been a visiting professor at the Institut d’Etudes Politiques de Paris (Sciences Po), the University of Oslo, the University of Sydney, the London School of Economics, and the Fundação Getulio Vargas.

He is also the co-director of the Institute for Social and Economic Research and Policy at Columbia.

== Academic work ==
Connelly's research predominantly focuses on the history of the 20th century. His work employs novel and innovative approaches to historical study, including examining the past through a global or transnational lens, and applying data-mining techniques to historical research.

=== A Diplomatic Revolution ===
Connelly's first book, A Diplomatic Revolution: Algeria's Fight for Independence and the Origins of the Post-Cold War Era (2002, Oxford U. Pr.), examines the international diplomacy of Algerian independence. It is a revisionist account that analyzes the transnational networks through which Algerian statesman struggled for liberation, rather than adopting a traditional focus on the national aspects of the movement. Foreign Affairs magazine observes that "Connelly weaves into his story the changing roles of the United States, Gamal Abdel Nasser's Egypt, Morocco, and Tunisia; the ebb and flow of FLN relations with the soviet bloc; and much more". A Diplomatic Revolution is notable in locating fundamental shifts in international society as occurring during the Algerian independence movement, arguing that "population growth, environmental scarcities, international institutions, new media, and, not least, the conscious agency of colonized peoples were already combining to cause radical change— of a recognizably new kind— when some might assume the international system was frozen into an ideological contest between East and West". The book has also been revised and translated into French as L'arme secrète du FLN: Comment de Gaulle a Perdu la Guerre d'Algérie.

=== Fatal Misconception ===
Fatal Misconception: The Struggle to Control World Population (2008, Harvard U. Pr.) charts the history of global efforts to control population growth. The book documents the diverse and often disturbing methods used by countries, foundations, and organizations to control populations, particularly in the Global South. Helen Epstein of the New York Review of Books notes that "Though painful to read, [Fatal Misconception] contain[s] many valuable lessons for anyone who cares about making development programs work, both technically and politically.” Some reviewers express concern that the book's arguments might be appropriated by contemporary anti-abortion advocates. Nicholas Kristof, in a review for the New York Times, argues that "the family planning movement has corrected itself, and today it saves the lives of women in poor countries and is central to efforts to reduce poverty worldwide. If we allow that past to tarnish today’s efforts by family planning organizations, women in poor countries will be doubly hurt by." Connelly emphasizes the importance of freedom of choice and individual rights in how we justify family planning. In an interview documented in Salon, he asserts that: "it’s important that we make our stand on reproductive rights when we’re arguing for family planning services, and for safe and legal access to abortion." Mahmood Mamdani, a professor of Government at the School of International and Public Affairs, says of Fatal Misconception, “Connelly raises the most profound political, social, and moral questions. His history reveals that the difference between population control and birth control is indeed that between coercion and choice.”

=== The Declassification Engine ===
The Declassification Engine: What History Reveals About America's Top Secrets (2023, Pantheon) documents multiple concerns with official secrets in the U.S. These include, "Three major lessons from Pearl Harbor":

1. Secrets are often kept to hide incompetence.
2. [C]atastrophic attacks almost never come out of nowhere. ... [L]eaders prefer to pretend they had no warning. In fact, claiming that an attack is completely unexpected can help legitimate more espionage, domestic surveillance, and military spending.
3. [O]ur leaders think we can’t handle the truth and wouldn’t support their plans if we knew what they were.

Connelly documents that the Franklin Roosevelt administration wanted to get into the war in Europe before the attack on Pearl Harbor, but the U.S. Congress refused to support it. The Tripartite Pact of 27 September 1940 strengthened the Axis alliance of Germany, Italy, and Japan. The U.S. responded by embargoing first scrap iron and eventually oil exports to Japan. Roosevelt hoped he could "maneuver them into the position of firing the first shot without allowing too much danger to ourselves".

Part of the problem with the Bay of Pigs, the Cuban Missile Crisis, the Vietnam War, and many other national security issues is that the "need to know" requirement of the U.S. system of classified information makes it relatively easy for military and civil servants to be less than forthright and even deceptive with their superiors, including the President.

He also says that the "need to know" requirement often makes it hard for intelligence analysts to get the information they need, and ultimately, "a lot of secret intelligence is not actually secret, and what is secret is often not intelligent".

Connelly also claims, "There is nothing more dangerous—both to itself, and to others—than a nuclear-armed superpower that is not even answerable to its own people." He further says, "In some cases, the U.S. military itself has prepared to launch nuclear weapons based on false warnings. We still live in fear of surprise attacks, as shown by the panic created in Hawaii in 2018 after an alarm indicated an imminent missile strike. We should actually be more alarmed by the very real risk that all our preparations for war will result in the United States’ provoking just such an attack, or accidentally launching one of our own."

He claims that prior to the run-up to World War II, the US had prided itself in its "radical transparency", not even encrypting diplomatic communications. He said, "The early republic also fostered a culture of information sharing by delivering newspapers at long distances at little cost through an ever-expanding network of post offices, where they were often displayed for public consumption."

Managing the volume of classified information generated by the United States' government is central to The Declassification Engine. The U.S. government, Connelly argues, produces many times more classified documents than can reasonably be reviewed with the existing resources, with some records destroyed or deliberately not written down to make sure they never come to light. Connelly cites a number of pop cultural products—the films Raiders of the Lost Ark and Hidden Figures, as well as Isaac Asimov's Foundation novels, both to illustrate the danger of overclassification and at times to indicate the role information technology may play in enabling more efficient methods of declassification.

== Professional work ==
=== Secrecy ===
Connelly is also the principal investigator at History Lab, a collective of Columbia University data scientists and historians that apply data-mining techniques to historical documents. History Lab has aggregated the largest online database of declassified documents anywhere in the world, while developing tools for researchers to explore these documents. The project is also attempting to find a solution to the growing crisis in government declassification. In an article for the New York Times, Connelly and Richard Immerman observe that "in the late 1990s more than 200 million pages of documents were being declassified each year. Today, that figure has stagnated at around 30 million, despite a huge increase in classified data." History Lab hopes to develop tools to machine-assist the declassification process. This would improve the efficiency and security of declassification, while also providing academics and researchers more data to understand government policy. The New Yorker, in an article on the initiative, states that the "researchers hope the project will help illuminate the space between necessary secrets and over-caution."

=== Predicting and Preparing for Catastrophic Threats ===
In 2009 Connelly started a research program on catastrophic threats, the Hertog Global Strategy Initiative. Over four years, teams of student researchers analyzed the history and future of nuclear proliferation, pandemics, environmental collapse, and religious extremism. Connelly partnered with experts who co-taught in the program each summer, Frank Gavin, Steven Morse, James Fleming, and Monica Toft. Invited speakers included Hans Blix, Tony Fauci, D.A. Henderson, David Heymann, Robert Gallucci, Peggy Hamburg, Henry Kissinger, Wally Broecker, Gavin Schmidt, and Bill McKibben.

== Awards and honours ==
- 2002 George Louis Beer Prize, A Diplomatic Revolution
- 2003, Stuart L. Bernath Book Prize
- 2003, Paul Birdsall Book Prize
- 2004, Akira Iriye International History Book Award
- 2004, Edgar S. Furniss Book Award in National and International Security
- 2004, Guggenheim Fellowship
