= Hostile worlds =

Sociological concept

Hostile worlds is sociologist Viviana Zelizer's term for the view that the market must be kept separate from intimate, sacred, and otherwise important spheres if they are to retain their value and importance.

Zelizer argues that the hostile worlds view assumes

"that the entry of instrumental means such as monetization and cost accounting into the worlds of caring, friendship, sexuality, and parent-child relations depletes them of their richness, hence that zones of intimacy only thrive if people erect effective barriers around them."

Zelizer contrasts hostile worlds with the "nothing but" view. In contrast to hostile worlds, the "nothing but" view does not divide social relations into separate spheres of money, on the one hand, and intimate relations, on the other. For the "nothing but" view, there is nothing but the market (or culture, or politics).

This theory has been used to study intimate relations, as in Zelizer's other work, but also to examine care relationships, art and other areas. For example, Olav Velthuis used this to understand the views of contemporary artists and their hostility to investment interests. Erica Coslor found the hostile worlds view the prevalent view for collectors and art lovers, though not necessarily all gallerists.
