= Institute on Medicine as a Profession =

Former American health care think tank

- Motto: "The Institute on Medicine as a Profession aims to make professionalism a field and a force. It promotes this mission through research and policy initiatives."
- Established: 2003
- Budget: Revenue: $67,234; Expenses: $953,925 (FYE December 2017)
- Address: 622 West 168th Street, Suite 1525; New York, NY 10032
- Location: New York, New York
- Dissolved: 2018

The Institute on Medicine as a Profession (IMAP) was an American non-profit health care policy think tank housed at Columbia University in New York City.

== History ==
IMAP grew from the Open Society Institute’s Medicine as a Profession initiative, which ran from 1999-2004. In 2003, the Open Society Institute gave a grant of $7.5 million to establish the Institute on Medicine as Profession as an independent entity, to be chaired by David J. Rothman, professor at Columbia University, and housed at Columbia's College of Physicians and Surgeons.

The Institute also received grants from Pew Charitable Trusts, the ABIM Foundation, the American Legacy Foundation, and Permanente Medical Group. It did not accept funding from industry sources.

In 2018, IMAP was merged with the Center on Medicine as a Profession to form the Division of Social Medicine and Professionalism, part of Colombia's Department of Health and Medical Ethics. It is housed at Irving Medical Center.

== Work ==
IMAP's primary area of focus was the concept of medical professionalism. Other areas included conflicts of interest in the health care industry; the role of physicians in national security interrogations; marketing practices in the drug, alcohol, food and tobacco industries; and health information technology. The institute also funded a physician advocacy grants program that aims to train physicians to advocate for policy change at the local, state and national level.

It was a partner and co-sponsor of the China-US Center on Medical Professionalism based in Beijing.
