= Nina Bandelj =

Economic sociologist, author and academic

- Occupations: Economic sociologist, author and academic

Academic background
- Education: IB, B.A. in Sociology; M.A. in Sociology; PhD. in Sociology
- Alma mater: Augsburg College; Princeton University
- Thesis: [ProQuest 305307646 Embedded Economies: Foreign Direct Investment in Central and Eastern Europe] (2003)
- Academic advisors: Bruce Western; Viviana Zelizer; Paul DiMaggio

Academic work
- Institutions: University of California, Irvine

Nina Bandelj is an economic sociologist, author and academic. She is a Chancellor's Professor in the Department of Sociology, Associate Vice Provost for faculty development, and co-director of the Center for Organizational Research at the University of California, Irvine (UCI). She is also a visiting professor at the IEDC-Bled School of Management and a Faculty Fellow at the Center for Cultural Sociology at Yale University.

Bandelj is most known for her work in economic sociology where she has examined the impacts of culture, politics, and emotions in shaping economic processes with a focus on postsocialist changes, globalization and financialization. She is the author and editor of several books including From Communists to Foreign Capitalists: The Social Foundations of Foreign Investment in Postsocialist Europe, Socialism Vanquished, Socialism Challenged: Eastern Europe and China and Money Talks: Explaining How Money Really Works.

Bandelj is an elected member of the Sociological Research Association. She was a vice-president of the American Sociological Association and President-Elect of the Society for the Advancement of Socio-Economics. She served as an editor of Socio-Economic Review and holds editorial appointments at journals including the International Journal of Comparative Sociology, Journal of Comparative Research in Anthropology and Sociology, Druzboslovne Razprave and the American Journal of Cultural Sociology.

== Education ==
Bandelj completed an International Baccalaureate program in Ljubljana, Slovenia. In 1993, she enrolled at Augsburg College in Minneapolis and earned her B.A. in sociology and communication. She then pursued further education at Princeton University, where she obtained her master's degree and PhD in sociology. Her dissertation titled Embedded Economies: Foreign Direct Investment in Central and Eastern Europe was awarded the Seymour Martin Lipset Prize from Society for Comparative Research.

== Career ==
Following her PhD, Bandelj began working as an assistant professor in 2003, at the University of California, Irvine, where she became a Chancellor's Professor in the Department of Sociology. She has received fellowships from the European University Institute in Florence, Italy, the Max Planck Institute for the Study of Societies in Cologne, Germany and the Center for Advanced Study in the Behavioral Sciences at Stanford. She is currently serving as a visiting professor at IEDC Bled School of Management and as a Faculty Fellow at the Center for Cultural Sociology at Yale University

Bandelj holds concurrent appointments as inaugural Associate Vice-Provost for Faculty Development, and co-director of the Center for Organizational Research, at the University of California, Irvine.

Bandelj was the Chair of the Economic Sociology Section of the American Sociological Association (ASA), as well as the co-chair of the RC09 of the International Sociological Association, and as a Council-at-large member of the ASA. Additionally, she was elected as the 2021-22 Vice President of the ASA and is the President-Elect of the Society for the Advancement of Socio-Economics for 2023–24.

== Research ==
Bandelj's research primarily focuses on two areas of inquiry: economic sociology and social change, with a specific emphasis on the transformations that have occurred in Central and Eastern Europe in the context of globalization.

=== Economic sociology ===
Bandelj has discussed the various aspects of economic sociology and its possible contributions. In her book From Communists to Foreign Capitalists: The Social Foundations of Foreign Investment in Postsocialist Europe, which Doug Guthrie for Administrative Science Quarterly called "an outstanding piece of work on the postsocialist transformation", she identified that politics, states, and path dependency play a crucial role in how markets are created and how they operate. She also found that the extent of legitimacy given by host nations to foreign direct investment (FDI) had a greater influence on the amount of foreign capital entering post-socialist countries during the initial phase of market reform, as opposed to formal regulations. In a related study, she highlighted that foreign globalization may be framed both in favor as well as against national interests, with multiple and contradictory views due to uncertain economic consequences shaped by social identities and postsocialist macro conditions. In her book, The Cultural Wealth of Nations, she examined how symbolic and cultural resources of countries, or cultural wealth, affect economic development.

=== Emotion and economy ===
Bandelj has worked on understanding the influence of emotions on economic actions or interactions, or ‘emotional embeddedness,’ and identified improvisation and situational adaptation as two such behaviors, where improvisation involves the emergence of goals and means through emotional interactions, and situational adaptation occurs when actors modify their goals or methods in response to emotional changes resulting from interactions with others. She has published several analytical reviews of research on emotions and economy where she overviewed statements of classical sociologists and political economists, the concept of ‘emotion work’ and the role of emotions in economic action and interaction.

=== Money talks ===
Bandelj has conducted research on the fundamentals of money, including its origin, uses, effects and future and its impact on society at a broader level. In her book Money Talks: Explaining How Money Really Works, she has discussed an analysis of the complex and multifaceted role that money plays in people's lives and society as a whole. In a review for the American Journal of Sociology, Cheris Shun-ching Chan commended this book for its capacity to integrate diverse voices into a unified and meaningful collection, describing it as a remarkable achievement, and also added that, "I applaud the three editors for weaving the chapters into meaningful themes...".

In related research, her collaborative study with Lanuza and Kim examined the role of gender in shaping money attitudes and indicated that while young women report a greater concern about money than men when considering the present, there are no notable gender differences when considering the future scenarios such as the likelihood of supporting a family financially or having a job with a good salary. She has written on relational work in the economy and how economic actors match different monies with social relations and economic transactions, extending the work of sociologist Viviana Zelizer. She has also written on the new social value of children, or the emergence of the human capital child.

== Bibliography ==
=== Books ===
- From Communists to Foreign Capitalists: The Social Foundations of Foreign Direct Investment in Postsocialist Europe (2008) ISBN 978-0-691-12912-9
- Economic Sociology of Work (2009) ISBN 978-1-84855-368-2.
- Economy and State: A Sociological Perspective (2010) ISBN 978-0-7456-4455-4
- The Cultural Wealth of Nations (2011) ISBN 978-0-8047-7645-5
- Socialism Vanquished, Socialism Challenged: Eastern Europe and China, 1989-2009 (2012) ISBN 978-0-19-999626-1
- Money Talks: Explaining How Money Really Works (2017) ISBN 978-0-691-16868-5

=== Selected articles ===
- Mahutga, Matthew C.; Bandelj, Nina (2008). "Foreign Investment and Income Inequality". International Journal of Comparative Sociology. 49 (6): 429–454. doi:10.1177/0020715208097788. S2CID 154579226.
- Bandelj, Nina (2009). "The Global Economy as Instituted Process: The Case of Central and Eastern Europe". American Sociological Review. 74 (1): 128–149. doi:10.1177/000312240907400107. hdl:11858/00-001M-0000-0012-4603-8.
- Bandelj, Nina (2012). "Relational Work and Economic Sociology". Politics & Society. 40 (2): 175–201. doi:10.1177/0032329212441597. S2CID 147397753.
- Bandelj, Nina (2020). "Relational Work in the Economy". Annual Review of Sociology. 46: 251–272. doi:10.1146/annurev-soc-121919-054719. S2CID 218826294.
- Bandelj, Nina; Lanuza, Yader R.; Kim, Julie S. (2021). "Gendered Relational Work: How gender shapes money attitudes and expectations of young adults". Journal of Cultural Economy. 14 (6): 765–784. doi:10.1080/17530350.2021.1952098. S2CID 238638386.
- Penner, Andrew M.; Petersen, Trond; Hermansen, Are Skeie; Rainey, Anthony; Boza, István; Elvira, Marta M.; Godechot, Olivier; Hällsten, Martin; Henriksen, Lasse Folke; Hou, Feng; Mrčela, Aleksandra Kanjuo; King, Joe; Kodama, Naomi; Kristal, Tali; Křížková, Alena; Lippényi, Zoltán; Melzer, Silvia Maja; Mun, Eunmi; Apascaritei, Paula; Avent-Holt, Dustin; Bandelj, Nina; Hajdu, Gergely; Jung, Jiwook; Poje, Andreja; Sabanci, Halil; Safi, Mirna; Soener, Matthew; Tomaskovic-Devey, Donald; Tufail, Zaibu (February 2023). "Within-job gender pay inequality in 15 countries". Nature Human Behaviour. 7 (2): 184–189. doi:10.1038/s41562-022-01470-z. PMC 9957724. PMID 36424396.
- Bandelj, Nina; Spiegel, Michelle (2022). "Pricing the Priceless Child 2.0.: Children as Human Capital Investment". Theory and Society. doi:10.1007/s11186-022-09508-x. PMC 9734339.
