= Neofunctionalism (sociology) =

Sociological theory on integration

Neofunctionalism is the perspective that all integration is the result of past integration. The term may also be used to literally describe a social theory that is "post" traditional structural functionalism. Whereas theorists such as Jeffrey C. Alexander openly appropriated the term, others, such as the post-structuralist philosopher Michel Foucault, have been categorized as contemporary functionalists by their critics.

== History ==
Functionalism in international relations theory was developed by David Mitrany. International relations neofunctionalism was developed by Ernst Haas in the 1960s to give a formal explanation to the work of Jean Monnet (1888–1979).

== Parsonian thinking ==
In sociology, neofunctionalism represents a revival of the thought of Talcott Parsons by Jeffrey C. Alexander, who sees neofunctionalism as having five central tendencies:

- to create a form of structural functionalism that is multidimensional and includes micro as well as macro levels of analysis
- to push functionalism to the left and reject Parsons's optimism about modernity
- to argue for an implicit democratic thrust in functional analysis
- to incorporate a conflict orientation, and
- to emphasize uncertainty and interactional creativity.

While Parsons consistently viewed actors as analytical concepts, Alexander defines action as the movement of concrete, living, breathing persons as they make their way through time and space. In addition he argues that every action contains a dimension of free will, by which he is expanding functionalism to include some of the concerns of symbolic interactionism.

Neil J. Smelser sets out to establish the concept of ambivalence as an essential element of understanding individual behaviour and social institutions. His approach, based on Sigmund Freud's theory, takes intrapsychic processes rather than roles at the starting point. He sees ambivalence (to hold opposing affective orientations toward the same person object or symbol) as most applicable in situations where persons are dependent on one another. The common element of dependency is in his opinion that freedom to leave is restricted because it is costly either politically, ideologically or emotionally. Thus dependence entails entrapment. Following his views on ambivalence, Smelser argues that attitude surveys should be seen as distorted structures of reality that minimize and delegitimize ambiguity and ambivalence.

== Niklas Luhmann's objection ==
Niklas Luhmann sees Parsons' theory as missing the concepts of self-reference and complexity. Self-reference is a condition for the efficient functioning of systems. It means that a system is able to observe itself, can reflect on itself and can make decisions as a result of this reflection. In Luhmann's theory, the chief task performed by social systems is to reduce complexity, which brings more choices and more possibilities; it takes more noes to reach a "yes". Religion or functional equivalents in modern society can provide actors with shared standards of action accepted on faith, which allow complex sets of interactions to proceed in a world that would otherwise be chaotic and incomprehensible.

Furthermore Luhmann makes the distinction between risk, a potential harm threatening an individual that is based on a decision made by the individual, and danger, a potential harm to which an individual is passively exposed. The critical difference between the decision maker and the people affected by the decision is that what is a risk for one is a danger for the other. Whereas people in primitive societies were threatened primarily by dangers, people in modern society are threatened primarily by risks caused by our dependency on the decision makers.

== See also ==
- Marxism
- Critical theory
- Positivism
- Antipositivism
- Structure and agency
- Auguste Comte
- Émile Durkheim
- Herbert Spencer
- Bronisław Malinowski
- Anthony Giddens
- Jürgen Habermas
