= Jeffrey C. Alexander =

American sociologist (born 1947)

- Born: Jeffrey Charles Alexander; May 30, 1947 (age 79); Milwaukee, Wisconsin, U.S.
- Occupation: Professor Emeritus of Sociology
- Children: Aaron Alexander-bloch, Benjamin Alexander-Bloch

Academic background
- Education: Harvard University (BA); University of California, Berkeley (PhD)
- Thesis: Theoretical Logic in Sociology (1978)
- Doctoral advisor: Robert N. Bellah
- Other advisors: Leo Lowenthal, Neil Smelser
- Influences: Robert N. Bellah; Émile Durkheim; Talcott Parsons; Edward Shils

Academic work
- Discipline: Sociology
- Sub-discipline: Cultural sociology
- School or tradition: Neofunctionalism
- Institutions: University of California, Los Angeles; Yale University

Jeffrey Charles Alexander (born 1947) is an American sociologist and social theorist.

He demonstrated that social actions and dynamics are not explained solely by rational logic, but also by the symbolic and emotional meanings underlying them.

By challenging traditional theories that regarded culture as merely an echo of economic and political forces, Jeffrey C. Alexander placed culture at the heart of sociological analysis. While Marxism viewed culture as a superstructure linked to the interests of dominant classes, and functionalism considered it a factor of social stability, Alexander reoriented sociological analysis by positioning culture at the center. He showed that cultural symbols, narratives, and rituals are not passive but active in structuring societies, decisively influencing social behaviors and institutions.

In the 1990s, Alexander developed a body of work known as the Strong Program. This theoretical framework asserts that culture should be studied as an independent force, directly shaping social actions and institutions.

Since the 2000s, the Strong Program has become a major movement in sociology, shaping research on how culture influences modern societies. Concepts such as cultural trauma are among Jeffrey C. Alexander's significant contributions, leaving a lasting impact on the social sciences.

== Biography ==
=== Family and early life ===
Jeffrey C. Alexander was born on 30 May 1947 in Milwaukee, Wisconsin (United States).

His father, Frederick Charles Alexander, worked in industrial advertising, where he held a position as an account executive after starting out as a copywriter. His mother, Esther Leah Schlussmann, graduated in dietetics from the University of Wisconsin in the late 1930s. She first worked as a dietitian in hospitals in New York City, then, during World War II, in a weapons factory. After the war, she became a stay-at-home mother.

Jeffrey Alexander's parents had liberal and Democratic political commitments. They followed political news closely, particularly the American context marked by the period of McCarthyism. Although they were not members of the Communist Party USA, they openly criticized the persecution of communist sympathizers during that time, regularly highlighting the social importance of the ideals defended by the American communist movement of the 1930s. His mother regularly took university courses throughout Jeffrey Alexander's childhood.

=== Adolescence ===
Jeffrey Alexander moved with his family to Los Angeles during his youth. During his teenage years, his father, intent on instilling the value of work, insisted that he take on paid jobs rather than receive pocket money. He thus worked as a busboy in a private country club that openly discriminated by refusing to accept Jewish members. Being of Jewish origin himself, this personal experience of discrimination had a lasting influence on him.

On that occasion, he met an older African American colleague who also worked at the club and was intellectually engaged and critical of racism and social injustice. This man introduced him for the first time to the identity term "Afro-american", at a time when it was not yet widely used. Deeply marked by these conversations, Jeffrey Alexander wrote a short story inspired by the encounter and submitted it to the magazine The New Yorker. Although the story was rejected, it was returned with handwritten comments encouraging his literary style.

At the same time, while studying at University High School in Los Angeles, he was particularly influenced by an English teacher who was a follower of New Criticism, a formalist analytical method then popular in literary studies. This teacher was the first significant intellectual figure in Alexander's life and played a key role in fostering his growing interest in the humanities, and later in cultural sociology.

The school had around 3,000 students from a wide range of social, ethnic and cultural backgrounds, which was a formative experience for him in encountering a heterogeneous urban society.

=== University ===
Jeffrey Alexander then enrolled at Harvard University, where he earned a Bachelor's degree in 1969 in an interdisciplinary program called "Social Studies", combining social theory, political philosophy, psychology, and psychoanalysis.

During his time at Harvard, in the context of the Vietnam War, he became politically active and joined the student movement Students for a Democratic Society (SDS). He participated in study groups on Marxism and socialist theory.

Initially, he aspired to become mayor of Los Angeles, inspired by liberal figures such as Lyndon B. Johnson.

His intellectual interest in sociology was reinforced by a personal anecdote: while standing in line at a cinema in Los Angeles with a friend who was a student at Berkeley, he commented on the behavior of the people around them. She then suggested he should become a sociologist, directly mentioning Erving Goffman, whose work he discovered as a result.

Another turning point in his intellectual development came through an individual tutorial at Harvard with a graduate student in economics, who introduced him to the works of David Riesman, Kenneth Keniston, Herbert Marcuse, John Kenneth Galbraith, and C. Wright Mills. According to Alexander, this tutorial played a decisive role in his decision to pursue an academic career in sociology.

=== Doctorate at Berkeley ===
After Harvard, Jeffrey Alexander pursued doctoral studies at the University of California, Berkeley, which at the time had a reputation for progressive academic culture and played a central role in the student movements of the 1960s. It was during his time at Berkeley that he identified the sociologists he wanted to work with: Neil Smelser, Robert N. Bellah, and Leo Löwenthal. All three joined his dissertation committee, chaired by Robert Bellah, himself a former student of Talcott Parsons.

During his doctoral training, he also underwent intensive psychoanalysis in San Francisco, attending four sessions per week over five and a half years. This experience had a significant influence on his understanding of society and his critical reading of social phenomena.

Jeffrey Alexander received his Ph.D. in sociology in 1978, with a dissertation titled Theoretical Logic in Sociology, published in four volumes:

- Volume 1: Positivism, Presuppositions, and Current Controversies
- Volume 2: The Antinomies of Classical Thought: Marx and Durkheim
- Volume 3: The Classical Attempt at Theoretical Synthesis: Max Weber
- Volume 4: The Modern Reconstruction of Classical Thought: Talcott Parsons

This work formed part of a broader intellectual movement aimed at re-evaluating and revitalizing the ideas of Talcott Parsons, following a decade of critical backlash in American sociology.

=== Career ===
He worked at the University of California, Los Angeles, from 1974 until joining Yale University in 2001, where (as of 2008) he is the Lillian Chavenson Saden Professor of Sociology and co-director of the Center for Cultural Sociology. He has twice (Spring 1992, Spring 1996) been a Fellow at the Swedish Collegium for Advanced Study in Uppsala, Sweden.

Alexander has authored or co-authored ten books. He was one of the editors of the journal Sociological Theory, and he is currently co-editor of the American Journal of Cultural Sociology.

He received honorary doctorates from :

- La Trobe University (Melbourne),
- University College Dublin (Ireland)
- University of Veracruz (Mexico)
- Masaryk University (Czechia),
- and Linnaeus University (Sweden)

In 2004, he won the Clifford Geertz Award for Best Article in Cultural Sociology and in 2008, he won the Mary Douglas Prize for Best Book in Cultural Sociology. He also received the 2007 Theory Prize from the Theory Section of the American Sociological Association for best theoretical article. In 2009, he received The Foundation Mattei Dogan Prize in Sociology by the International Sociological Association, awarded every four years in recognition of lifetime accomplishments to "a scholar of very high standing in the profession and of outstanding international reputation."

Notable students of Jeffrey Alexander include Ronald Jacobs, Philip Smith, Isaac Reed, Matthew Norton, and Elizabeth Breese.

== Contributions ==
=== Neofunctionalism ===
In sociology, neofunctionalism represents a revival of the thought of Talcott Parsons by Jeffrey C. Alexander, who sees neofunctionalism as having five central tendencies:

- to create a form of functionalism that is multidimensional and includes micro as well as macro levels of analysis
- to push functionalism to the left and reject Parsons's optimism about modernity
- to argue for an implicit democratic thrust in functional analysis
- to incorporate a conflict orientation, and
- to emphasize uncertainty and interactional creativity.

While Parsons consistently viewed actors as analytical concepts, Alexander defines action as the movement of concrete, living, breathing persons as they make their way through time and space. In addition he argues that every action contains a dimension of free will, by which he is expanding functionalism to include some of the concerns of symbolic interactionism.

=== The cultural turn and cultural sociology ===
Starting in the late 1980s, Alexander's work turned toward cultural sociology. Key to this cultural turn was a shift in emphasis from an engagement with Parsonian structural functionalism toward a rereading of Emile Durkheim's later works, which featured a strong interest in cultural systems. Durkheim's Elementary Forms of Religious Life was key to Alexander's thought, as in this work Durkheim analyzes the ways by which collective representations emerge and function, as well as the role of rituals in maintaining solidarity and reiterating society's norms and values to the congregation. Alexander picks up specifically on Durkheim's suggestion that the religious processes observed in tribal societies are as pertinent in modern societies. Regardless of whether modern societies believe themselves to be rational and secular, their civil life and processes, claims Alexander, are underpinned by collective representations, by strong emotional ties and by various narratives that—much like tribal societies—tell society what it believes it is and what values it holds sacred.

==== Differences between the sociology of culture and cultural sociology ====
Alexander distinguishes between the sociology of culture and cultural sociology. The sociology of culture sees culture as a dependent variable—that is, a product of extra-cultural factors such as the economy or interest-laden politics—whereas cultural sociology sees culture as having more autonomy and gives more weight to inner meanings. In other words, in Alexander's conception of cultural sociology assumes that ideas and symbolic processes may have an independent effect on social institutions, on politics, and on culture itself. Alexander strongly distinguishes this sociological perspective from the then-dominant Bourdieusian sociological framework, which tends to see cultural processes as embedded in power struggles, and ultimately in material inequality.

==== Cultural trauma ====
Two of Alexander's earlier articles foreshadow a more direct engagement with the topic of trauma. In one, he demonstrates that Western societies did not immediately interpret the Holocaust as universally signifying universal evil. (Rather than that, a long process of narration and signification constructed the Holocaust image.) In the second article, Alexander shows that American society did not initially perceive the Watergate scandal as much more than a minor incident. Here, too, the incident had to be culturally narrated and constructed as involving the core values of American society, turning what was first thought to be a mundane faux-pas into a full-fledged scandal. A key claim of both studies is that even events that are currently thought of as deeply traumatic for civil society are not inherently devastating but are rather constructed as such through cultural processes.

More generally, Alexander differentiates "cultural trauma" from what he calls "lay trauma" in social thought. "Lay trauma" refers to the idea that certain events are inherently traumatic to the individuals who experience them—for example, the idea of trauma in psychology. However, "cultural trauma" approach cannot assume that any event—as horrendous as it may be—will turn into a trauma for the collective who encounters it. As Alexander explains, "[C]ultural trauma occurs when members of a collectivity feel they have been subjected to a horrendous event that leaves indelible marks upon their group consciousness, marking their memories forever and changing their future identity in fundamental and irrevocable ways".

==== Social performance ====
In the mid-2000s Alexander turned attention toward the ways actors create social or cultural performances, which are "the social process[es] by which actors, individually or in concert, display for others the meaning of their social situation". Actors, claims Alexander, care deeply about having others believe the meanings they attempt to convey, and to this end they seek to create a performance as authentic-looking as possible. To do so, they engage in what Alexander calls "cultural pragmatics" and draw upon the various elements of social performance: the systems of collective representation, means of symbolic production, mise-en-scène arrangements (much like a theater production would).

Alexander claims that in tribal societies the various elements of cultural performance were tightly fused, and were employed in collective rituals in which the entire tribe partook and its members experienced first-hand. In modern societies, these various elements became de-fused (as per Weber's sphere differentiation) and for this reason actors who wish to appear authentic must draw upon various repertoires. "Fusion", in Alexander's terms, is the moment in a performance when the various elements click together, generate an effective performance, and ultimately move the audience to psychological identification with the actors. A failed performance will be one that the audience will perceive as inauthentic, and will not develop the sense of identification the actors desired.

==== Iconic consciousness ====
In recent years, Alexander has turned attention towards the material aspects of culture, extending his specific strand of cultural sociology towards aesthetics and particularly icons. As he defines it, iconic consciousness occurs "when an aesthetically shaped materiality signifies social value. Contact with this aesthetic surface, whether by sight, smell, taste, touch provides a sensual experience that transmits meaning ...". In contradistinction with various sociologies of culture that have tended to see the visual or the material as a form of falsity or degradation, Alexander draws on the Durkheimian notion of the symbolic collective representation to argue that the ways in which culture operates—both in instilling and in recreating values—is intrinsically tied to symbolic material forms.

Studies following Alexander's approach have looked, for example, into the ways in which architecture is embedded in a deep meaning structure and have deep emotional resonance with the society that frequents them. Others have extended the idea of iconic consciousness into the realm of celebrities, and have explored the ways in which celebrities on one hand present an appealing aesthetic "surface" and on the other hand condense and convey a locus of "deep" meanings that resonate with the audience.

==== Performative revolutions ====
Following the Egyptian Revolution, Alexander conducted a study of the revolutionary months from a cultural sociological point of view, applying some of his previous theories in order to understand the ways in which the various protests voiced by demonstrators, journalists, bloggers, and public actors ultimately persuaded the Egyptian army to turn against the regime. The key to understanding the revolution, claims Alexander, is in the binary structure these various actors applied to the Moubarak regime, persuasively depicting it as corrupt and outdated and thereby convincing the wider public that it was a menace to Egyptian society.

== Key publications ==
=== Selected articles ===
- Alexander, Jeffrey C. The Societalization of Social Problems: Church Pedophilia, Phone Hacking, and the Financial Crisis. American Sociological Review, 83 (6): 1049–1078, 2018.
- Alexander, Jeffrey C. Culture trauma, morality and solidarity: The social construction of ‘Holocaust’ and other mass murders. Thesis Eleven, 132 (1): 3–16, 2016.
- Alexander, Jeffrey C. The Fate of the Dramatic in Modern Society: Social Theory and the Theatrical Avant-Guarde. Theory, Culture & Society, 31 (1): 3-24, 2014.
- Alexander, Jeffrey C. Iconic Power and Performance: the Role of the Critic. In: Iconic Power: Materiality and Meaning in Social Life, editor (with Dominik Bartmanski and Bernhard Giesen), Palgrave Macmillan, 25–38, 2012.
- Alexander, Jeffrey C. Clifford Geertz and the Strong Program: The Human Sciences and Cultural Sociology. Cultural Sociology, 2(2): 157–169, 2008.
- Alexander, Jeffrey C. Iconic Consciousness: The Material Feeling of Meaning. Environment and Planning D: Society and Space, 26: 782–794. 2008.
- Alexander, Jeffrey C. On the Social Construction of Moral Universals. Reprinted in: Alexander et al., Cultural Trauma and Collective Identity. University of California Press, 196–263, 2004.
- Alexander Jeffrey C. Cultural Pragmatics: Social Performance between Ritual and Strategy. Sociological Theory 22: 527–573. 2004.
- Alexander, Jeffrey C. From the Depths of Despair: Performance and Counter-Performance on September 11.. Sociological Theory 22 (1) 2004: 88–105.
- Alexander, Jeffrey C. Durkheim's Religious Revival, with Philip Smith (Review Essay, E. Durkheim/K. E. Fields trans., The Elementary Forms of Religious Life). American Journal of Sociology, 102 (2): 585–592, 1996.
- Alexander, Jeffrey C. Habermas' New Critical Theory: Its Promise and Problems . American Journal of Sociology. 91: 400–424, 1985
- Alexander, Jeffrey C. Formal and Substantive Voluntarism in the Work of Talcott Parsons: A Theoretical and Ideological Reinterpretation. American Sociological Review, 43: 177–198, 1978.

=== Recent books ===
- The Civil Sphere in Canada (University of British Columbia Press, 2025) (ed., with Mervyn Horgan)
- Frontlash / Backlash: The Crisis of Solidarity and the Threat to Civil Institutions (Polity, 2025)
- The Indian Civil Sphere (Polity, 2025) (ed., with Suryakant Waghmore)
- Civil Repair (Polity, 2024)
- Breaching the Civil Order: Radicalism and the Civil Sphere (Cambridge University Press, 2019) (ed., with Trevor Stack & Farhad Khosrokhavar)
- The Civil Sphere in East Asia (Cambridge University Press, 2019) (ed., with David A. Palmer, Sunwoong Park & Agnes Shuk-mei Ku)
- What Makes a Social Crisis?: The Societalization of Social Problems (Polity, 2019)
- The Drama of Social Life (Polity, 2017)
- Obama Power (with Bernadette Jaworsky, Polity 2014)
- The Dark Side of Modernity (Polity 2013)
- Trauma: A Social Theory (Polity 2012)
- Performative Revolution in Egypt: An Essay in Cultural Power (Bloomsbury USA, 2011)
- Performance and Power (Polity, 2011)
- Narrating Trauma: On the Impact of Collective Suffering (Paradigm Publishers, 2011) (with Ron Eyerman and Elizabeth Butler Breese)
- Interpreting Clifford Geertz: Cultural Investigation in the Social Sciences (Palgrave Macmillan, 2011) (ed., with Philip Smith and Matthew Norton)
- The Performance of Politics: Obama's Victory and the Democratic Struggle for Power (Oxford University Press, 2010)
- The New Social Theory Reader (2nd edn) (Routledge, 2008) (with Steven Seidman)
- A Contemporary Introduction to Sociology: Culture and Society in Transition (Paradigm Publishers, 2008) (with Kenneth Thompson)
- The Civil Sphere (Oxford University Press, 2006)
- Social Performance: Symbolic Action, Cultural Pragmatics, and Ritual (Cambridge University Press, 2006) (with Bernhard Giesen and Jason Mast)
- The Cambridge Companion to Durkheim (Cambridge University Press, 2005), (ed., with Philip Smith)
- Cultural Trauma and Collective Identity (University of California Press, 2004) (with Ron Eyerman, Bernhard Giesen, Neil J. Smelser and Piotr Sztompka)
- The Meanings of Social Life: A Cultural Sociology (Oxford University Press, 2003)
