= Yanjie Bian =

Chinese-American sociologist (born 1955)

- 边燕杰
- Born: November 10, 1955 (age 70); Tianjin, China
- Occupation: Sociologist
- Employer(s): University of Minnesota, Xi'an Jiaotong University
- Known for: Research on social networks, social capital, guanxi, and social stratification in China

Yanjie Bian (Chinese: 边燕杰; pinyin: Biān Yànjié; born November 10, 1955) is a Chinese-American sociologist. He is a Professor Emeritus of Sociology at the University of Minnesota and a Distinguished Professor at Xi’an Jiaotong University. His research focuses on social networks, social capital, and social stratification, specifically concerning the role of guanxi in the Chinese labor market.

== Education ==
Bian graduated from Nankai University with a Bachelor of Arts in Philosophy in 1982 and a Master of Arts in Sociology in 1984. He moved to the United States for graduate study at the University at Albany, SUNY, where he earned a PhD in Sociology in 1990. His doctoral dissertation, supervised by Nan Lin, examined the "work-unit" (danwei) structure and status attainment in urban China.

== Career ==
In 1991, Bian joined the faculty of the University of Minnesota. He served as the Director of Graduate Studies for the Department of Sociology from 1999 to 2000 and was later appointed Professor Emeritus in May 2025.

From 1997 to 2009, Bian held several positions at the Hong Kong University of Science and Technology (HKUST), including Chair Professor, Head of the Division of Social Science, and Associate Dean of Humanities and Social Science. While at HKUST, he founded the HKUST Survey Research Center.

In 2009, Bian was appointed the founding director of the Institute for Empirical Social Science Research (IESSR) at Xi'an Jiaotong University. He served as the Dean of the School of Humanities and Social Science at the same institution from 2009 to 2017.

== Research ==
Bian's research utilizes large-scale survey data and network analysis. He is a co-founder and co-Principal Investigator of the Chinese General Social Survey (CGSS), the first continuous nationwide survey project in mainland China.

His work on social capital argues that in the Chinese context, "strong ties" (close personal connections or guanxi) are often more significant for job attainment and resource access than the "weak ties" typically emphasized in Western sociological models.

== Recognition ==
- Chair, Asia and Asian America Section of the American Sociological Association (2009–2010).
- President, Chinese Association for Social Networks and Social Capital Research (2015–2017).
- Distinguished Scholarly Contribution Award, International Association for Chinese Management Research (2020).
- Highly Cited Researcher, Elsevier (2014–2021).

== Selected publications ==
- Bian, Y.; Logan, J.R. (1996). "Market transition and the persistence of power: The changing stratification system in urban China." American Sociological Review, 61 (5): 739–758. doi:[10.2307/2096450](https://doi.org/10.2307/2096450).
- Bian, Y.; Ang, S. (1997). "Guanxi networks and job mobility in China and Singapore." Social Forces, 75 (3): 981–1005. doi:[10.2307/2580520](https://doi.org/10.2307/2580520).
- Bian, Y. (2002). "Chinese Social Stratification and Social Mobility." Annual Review of Sociology, 28: 91–116. doi:[10.1146/annurev.soc.28.110601.141045](https://doi.org/10.1146/annurev.soc.28.110601.141045).
- Bian, Y. et al. (2005). "Occupation, Class, and Social Networks in Urban China." Social Forces, 83 (4): 1443–1468. doi:[10.1353/sof.2005.0056](https://doi.org/10.1353/sof.2005.0056).
- Bian, Y. (2015). "Beyond the Strength of Social Ties." SAGE Publications (essay/review).
