= Neil Gross =

American sociologist and academic

Neil Louis Gross (born June 1, 1971) is the Charles A. Dana Professor of Sociology and chair of the department of sociology at Colby College. He is also a visiting scholar at New York University's Institute for Public Knowledge. He has written several books on sociological and political topics, and also blogs for The Chronicle of Higher Education. Gross edited the American Sociological Association's journal Sociological Theory from 2009 to 2015. He previously taught at the University of Southern California, Harvard University, Princeton University, and the University of British Columbia.

== Early life and education ==
Gross grew up near Berkeley, California, raised by his stay-at-home mother and his father, a legal editor. Both of his parents were avid readers.

Gross earned a B.A. in Legal Studies from the University of California, Berkeley in 1992, and a Ph.D. from the University of Wisconsin-Madison in 2002. Before going to graduate school, Gross was a patrolman in the Berkeley Police Department.

== Career ==
From 2004 to 2008, Gross was an assistant professor of sociology at Harvard University, after which he joined the faculty of the University of British Columbia. He was the editor-in-chief of Sociological Theory for six years (2009–2015). In 2015, he left the University of British Columbia to become Charles A. Dana professor and chair of sociology at Colby College.

=== Biography of Richard Rorty ===
Gross garnered considerable attention for his 2008 book Richard Rorty: The Making of an American Philosopher, which was described by philosopher Barry Allen as using Rorty's life to "build a theory of the sociology of ideas." In his review, sociologist Neil Mclaughlin commended Gross for his "careful archival research, innovative theoretical synthesis and substantive contributions."

=== On liberalism in academia ===
Another focus of Gross' work has been the political leanings of university professors. With Solon Simmons, he began in 2006 a survey of 1417 faculty members at 927 U.S. universities, colleges, and community colleges, called the Politics of the American Professoriate. According to Inside Higher Ed, several experts said the survey data collected by Gross and Simmons "may become the definitive source for understanding professors' political views." Gross published an extensive analysis of the survey results in his 2013 book Why Are Professors Liberal and Why Do Conservatives Care? He and Simmons further analyzed this field of research in their 2014 compilation, Professors and Their Politics. Sociologist Joseph Hermanowicz regarded the compilation as an important work, on a par with "Paul Lazarsfeld and Wagner Theilen's classic study of 1958 and Seymour Martin Lipset and Everett Carll Ladd's 1976 work."

Gross has found, along with numerous other researchers, that there are more liberals than conservatives in university faculty, but he added that there is relatively little evidence indicating students are indoctrinated into liberal opinions during college. In a field of study where experts disagree, and some have taken opposing views specifically on Gross' methods and interpretations, he has criticized what he sees as conservative political bias intentionally distorting the results of demographic research on campus politics.

In a 2017 New York Times editorial entitled "Professors Behaving Badly", Gross wrote that the occasional "political outbursts" by professors on social media may not be a consequence of their far-left politics. Instead, he suggested that professors are becoming alienated by their bleak employment prospects and precarious economic status in the growing adjunct tier of the academic work force.

== Works ==
=== Articles ===
- "Comments on Searle", Anthropological Theory, vol. 6, n^{o} 1, March 2006, p. 55 (doi:10.1177/1463499606061734)

=== Books ===
- "Pragmatism, Phenomenology, and Twentieth-Century American Sociology" [Chapter Six, page 183] - in Sociology in America: A History, Craig Calhoun, ed. 2008. ISBN 9780226090955
- Richard Rorty: The Making of an American Philosopher- 2008. ISBN 9780226309903
- Social Knowledge in the Making - co-edited with Charles Camic and Michèle Lamont. 2011.
- Why Are Professors Liberal and Why Do Conservatives Care? - 2013. ISBN 9780674059092
- Professors and Their Politics - co-edited with Solon Simmons. 2014. ISBN 9781421413341
- Walk the Walk, How Three Police Chiefs Defied the Odds and Changed Cop Culture. 2023. ISBN 9781250777522
