= Ashley Mears =

American writer and sociologist

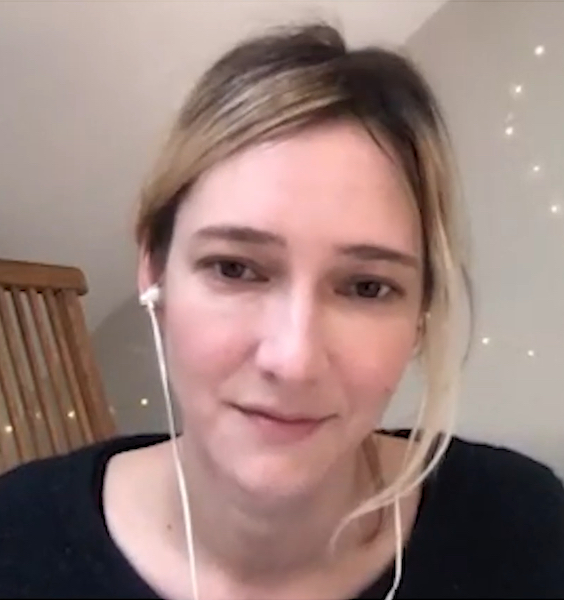
- Mears in 2020
- Title: Professor and Chair of Cultural Sociology and New Media
- Awards: Section on the Body and Embodiment Best Publication Award

Academic background
- Education: University of Georgia
- Alma mater: New York University
- Thesis: Pricing Beauty: The Production of Value in Fashion Modeling Markets (2009)

Academic work
- Discipline: Sociology
- Institutions: Boston University; University of Amsterdam
- Main interests: Culture, markets, work
- Notable works: Pricing Beauty: The Making of a Fashion Model
- Website: www.ashleymears.com

Ashley Mears is an American writer, sociologist, and former fashion model. She is currently Professor and Chair of Cultural Sociology and New Media at the University of Amsterdam. Mears is the author of Pricing Beauty: The Making of a Fashion Model and Very Important People: Status and Beauty in the Global Party Circuit.

== Early life and education ==
Mears grew up near Atlanta, Georgia. To supplement her regular job at a movie theater, she entered a modeling contest, won agency representation, and then started modeling part-time at the age of 16 in places like Milan, Italy and Osaka, Japan. Mears attended the University of Georgia receiving her B.A. in sociology in 2002 but continued her modeling work by spending summers working overseas. After completing her undergraduate education, she spent a year modeling in Asia, then moved to New York City at the age of 23 to pursue a Ph.D. in sociology. In New York she was again scouted for modeling jobs, and decided to focus her graduate research on the culture and economics of the modeling industry. She falsified her age, claiming to be younger, to get modeling jobs, then conducted a covert ethnographic study by taking notes and interviewing fellow models, scouts, and agents while working as a model in New York and London, including multiple appearances on the runway at New York Fashion Week.

Mears's children were born after she received tenure.

== Career ==
After earning her Ph.D. from New York University in 2009, Mears became an assistant professor of sociology at Boston University. Mears has held visiting positions at the University of Amsterdam and Central European University in Budapest. She served on the editorial boards of American Sociological Review, Signs, and Qualitative Sociology. She was also a Fellow at the Institute for Advanced Study in Budapest during the 2021–22 academic year and at the Sciences Po AxPo Observatory in Paris in 2023.

In 2011 her book Pricing Beauty: The Making of a Fashion Model was published by the University of California Press. Sociologist Heather Laine Talley, writing in the American Journal of Sociology, noted that while Pricing Beauty is about "how fashion insiders create aesthetic value," it also examines "the organization of markets, the process of cultural production, and reproduction of inequalities." Mears found that most fashion models operate against their short-term economic interests by accepting low-paying jobs that they hope will lead to greater recognition and higher-prestige jobs, but that very few models ever successfully attain such recognition, with the rest gradually aging out of the industry, sometimes while in debt to their modeling agencies, or switching to more lucrative but less prestigious commercial modeling. Due to her own success in modeling, Mears has expressed in the book that she almost abandoned her graduate studies altogether, citing the costs associated with it.

Pricing Beauty identifies the industry's idiosyncratic beauty standards as a major obstacle to success for models, not only in preferring "size-zero" body types, but in preferring white women above other women even within the "size-zero" category. Like other "ethnic" models, Mears was specifically advised not to mention her Korean heritage at castings. Mears concluded that industry insiders were not simply reflecting social preferences, but were actively producing beauty images designed to reproduce what sociologist Laura Grindstaff, in her review for Gender & Society, called "the gendered and racialized value hierarchies attached to beauty." A review in The Chronicle of Higher Education criticized this conclusion, suggesting that "Mears's attempts to make the numbers support her critique of the fashion industry for its whiteness reveal more about her wish to expose it than anything else." Publishers Weekly noted that Pricing Beauty was "probably too complex for the average reader" but praised the book as "a well-researched, well-written, and thorough study of the industry."

In 2017, she was awarded with the "Section on the Body and Embodiment Best Publication Award" for her article Girls as Elite Distinction: The Appropriation of Bodily Capital by Boston University. Mears has also written for The New York Times about her research after Pricing Beauty, including her covert ethnographic research on women recruited by promoters to attend VIP parties and nightlife events. That research was the basis for her 2020 book Very Important People: Status and Beauty in the Global Party Circuit, which was published by Princeton University Press. Very Important People analyzes the elite global party circuit as "a complex world of exchange and exploitation" in which club owners, promoters, and attractive women negotiate relationships and status in a social world of "gendered and racialized hierarchies". Mears found that men, particularly promoters, played a large role in determining the value of women's beauty in the elite party scene, but that women were also willing participants seeking to achieve their own aspirations. Writing for The Times Literary Supplement, Alice Bloch lauded Very Important People for exploring the nuances of social relationships "without passing predictable moral judgement".

In addition to her own publications, Mears is regularly cited by print and web media on issues in culture, markets, and work, such as why many models come from one region of the United States, how celebrity scandals affect the reputation of popular hotels and nightspots, whether fashion modeling is indentured servitude, whether "sexbots" will replace spouses, and the emotional labor of women in the workplace. In 2022, Mears was promoted to full professor of sociology at Boston University. In 2024, she began an appointment as Professor and Chair of Cultural Sociology and New Media at the University of Amsterdam.

In 2021, Mears co-founded the Ethnographic Café alongside sociology professors Loïc Wacquant (University of California, Berkeley) and Ekedi Mpondo-Dika. The online platform is a virtual meeting space for ethnographers to come together and discuss ethnography.

Mears was featured in a 2025 artwork titled "Work Portraits, Portrait Work" with Ben Wolf Noam.

Mears is working on a book called Now You See Me: The Economy of Misdirection as of 2026.

== Bibliography ==
- Pricing Beauty: The Making of a Fashion Model (University of California Press, 2011) ISBN 9780520270763
- Very Important People: Status and Beauty in the Global Party Circuit (Princeton University Press, 2020) ISBN 9780691168654
- Work Portraits Portrait Work (Zolo Press, 2025) ISBN 979-8-9909113-4-5
