= Thomas A. DiPrete =

American sociologist

Academic background
- Education: Massachusetts Institute of Technology (BS); Columbia University (PhD)

Academic work
- Discipline: Sociology
- Institutions: University of Chicago; Duke University; University of Wisconsin–Madison; Columbia University

Thomas DiPrete (born in 1950) is an American-born sociologist from Cranston, Rhode Island. DiPrete received his B.S. in Humanities and Science from the Massachusetts Institute of Technology and later earned a Ph.D. in sociology from Columbia University.

Prior to joining the Columbia faculty, DiPrete served on the faculties of the University of Chicago, Duke University, and the University of Wisconsin–Madison. Currently, DiPrete serves as Giddings Professor of sociology, co-director of the Institute for Social and Economic Research Policy, co-director of the Center for the Study of Wealth and Inequality at Columbia University, and a member of the faculty of the Columbia Population Research Center.

DiPrete's research interests encompass social stratification and mobility, education, economic sociology, family, demography, and quantitative methodology. His research has focused on applying quantitative methods to the study of social and gender inequality in education and in the workforce. His ongoing projects include the study of gender differences in educational performance, job attainment, and fields of study. Additionally, he has studied the relationship between education and earnings inequality. However, he has also done extensive work in the field of unequal compensation of corporate executives, including developing the leapfrog theory. His works have introduced several widely-known theories of sociology. He has been described as one of the most influential figures in modern studies of educational inequality and CEO compensation.

== Biography ==
=== Early life ===
Born in 1950 in Rhode Island (with his exact birthdate not publicly documented), he was raised in an Italian-American community in Cranston. His father Albert was second generation Italian and a dentist. His mother Jeanne Casey had Irish and French Canadian roots. He attended Catholic schools in Rhode Island and then went to MIT.

Family: Married to Katherine Ewing, a professor of cultural anthropology at Duke University before moving to Columbia as a professor of religion and director of the South Asia Institute while specializing in Islam, Sufism, and South Asia.

=== Educational background ===
- 1972: Earned a B.S. humanities and science from MIT, blending coursework in philosophy with applied mathematics.
- 1975: Completed an M.A. in mathematical statistics at Columbia University while pursuing doctoral studies.
- 1975: Completed M.Phil. in sociology at Columbia University while pursuing doctoral studies.
- 1978: Received Ph.D. in sociology from Columbia, advised by interdisciplinary methodologist Arthur Goldberger.

=== Academic career ===
DiPrete has held faculty positions at:

- University of Chicago (1979–1988)
- Duke University (1988–2005)
- University of Wisconsin–Madison (2010–2011)
- Columbia University (2004–present)

A fellow of the American Academy of Arts and Sciences (2022) and the American Association for the Advancement of Science (2015), his research integrates advanced quantitative methods with studies of educational systems, labor markets, and intergenerational mobility. He has held visiting positions at institutions including the Max Planck Institute and the Russell Sage Foundation.

== Research contributions ==
=== Job attainment ===
DiPrete researched the impact of equal employment opportunity (EEO) initiatives in the early 1970s. More specifically, he investigated the impact this had on the upward mobility of lower-level employees. Previously, professionalization acted as a status divider. It increased the status gap between upper- and lower-level jobs by creating distinct administrative and professional career lines that couldn't be attained by those working in lower-level jobs. For professional jobs, DiPrete recognized that candidates needed to have a college education. The professional and non-professional career lines in the federal government were made distinct formally with the Classification Act of 1923. While administrative jobs do not require the same level of education as professional jobs do, the lines to attain them were manipulated. The United States Civil Service Commission included four career lines in the general administrative and clerical occupational group in 1941, where many administrative roles were. By 1957, three out of these 64 career lines were exclusively administrative, and by 1983, it went up to eleven.

EEO programs attempted to reverse this separation. DiPrete's findings found that in 1973, about 10,000 federal employees were benefiting from EEO programs. Consequently, lower-level employees accomplished significant status promotion. A greater proportion of upper-level entry positions were filled by lower-level employees who had been promoted. While certain professional roles required a college education for proper training, the grades of upper- and lower-level positions overlapped in the middle levels of white-collar jobs. Therefore, the lower-level employees could get promoted through additional training on the job. About 90% of these lower level employees were women, and about half were minorities. Therefore, these initiatives mainly benefited them. Still, DiPrete's findings showed that female and minority lower-level employees were not more likely to get a promotion compared to male and white colleagues.

=== Gender and educational achievement ===
DiPrete's research (with Claudia Buchmann) explores the role of gender in shaping student experience within the educational system as well as the role of school environments in shaping gender disparities in academic achievement. Their work challenged the idea that innate differences between boys and girls account for the underperformance of male students in academic settings relative to female students. While some scholars argued that schools foster a demasculinized learning environment, DiPrete' and Buchmann's theory suggested that masculinity is shaped by learning environments, ultimately influencing how male students perceive academic engagement. In contrast, their theory suggested that peer culture for female students is less likely to stigmatize academic engagement as "un-feminine".

DiPrete and Buchmann also investigated the role of social and behavioral skills in academic performance. Their research found that male students receive roughly the same academic benefits from these skills as female students. However, their research found that female students enter school with stronger social and behavioral skills. These skills are positively correlated with reading and math performance. Furthermore, DiPrete and Buchmann found that additional factors such as socioeconomic status and the presence of a biological father in the household are associated with stronger social and behavioral skills.

=== Female advantage in higher education ===
DiPrete worked with Claudia Buchmann to further investigate the gender gap in educational achievement in the context of higher education. They defined a clear historical shift, finding that while 65% of bachelor's degrees were awarded to men in 1960, 58% of bachelor's degrees were awarded to women by 2004. DiPrete and Buchmann identified many social developments that explain the shift in gender expectations. As traditional gender roles have declined over time, women feel more incentivized to pursue higher education. Women are more likely to enroll in college and stay, whereas men are more likely to drop out.

This, in turn, has shifted parental investment patterns in favor of daughters. The growing vulnerability of boys to their family situation is explored by their research. Their data shows that males benefit when they have a father with some education at home but the benefit is no longer present when their father only completed high school or is not present. In recent years, boys who come from less-educated families or absent fathers have become disproportionately disadvantaged. Meanwhile, women who come from the same background exceed men in college completion.

DiPrete and Buchmann further explored the more evident disparities among African Americans in a later study with Anne McDaniel and Uri Shwed. At no time since at least 1940 have black men's college completion rates surpassed those of black women. While the rates of college completion for black people rose steadily over time, it grew more rapidly for women than for men. Black men were particularly adversely affected by race-based exclusion from high status jobs for college graduates including corporate managers and engineers. They found that the rising rate of incarceration of black men mildly contributed to the gender gap in college completion among black people.

DiPrete and Buchmann found that this gender imbalance has caused college administrators to be concerned about campus diversity. In response to the arising changes, there were considerations of affirmative action measures for male applicants in 2004.

=== Life course mobility ===
DiPrete conceptualized "mobility regimes" as national configurations of educational systems, labor markets, and welfare policies that collectively determine life course mobility by conditioning both the rates and the consequences of mobility-generating events such as job change or loss, marriage and divorce etc. This framework explains why countries with similar economic development exhibit divergent mobility rates over the life course. Countries can mitigate or enhance mobility either through policies or institutional arrangements that affect the rate at which these mobility events occur, by mitigating or enhancing the financial consequences of these events. Thus, the United States is a country with relatively high rates of mobility events (e.g, job loss) and counter-mobility events (e.g., reemployment). Germany is a country whose institutions dampen the rate of both positive and negative events. Sweden is a country which has relatively high rates of mobility events but its social insurance systems provide relatively high mitigation of their financial consequences.

His work highlights how public insurance mitigates socioeconomic risks (e.g., unemployment) in intragenerational mobility, with Sweden's welfare policies reducing career volatility compared to the U.S. private insurance via parental wealth also substitutes for weak public systems, perpetuating inequality.

Empirical findings: Comparative analysis across Western nations revealed that absolute mobility (children surpassing parental income) declined with rising inequality, while relative mobility remained stable due to offsetting educational access improvements and "glass floor" protections for affluent youth. DiPrete's wealth transmission studies showed U.S. families primarily perpetuate advantage through housing investments and college funding, contrasting with Germany's skill-certification systems and Sweden's welfare-state moderating effects. Educational institutions emerged as critical mediators in his work. Early academic tracking systems were found to amplify origin-based inequality, while college admission processes (particularly U.S.-style legacy preferences) create non-meritocratic mobility barriers.

Methodological innovations: His 1978 dissertation was perhaps the first application of Cox regression to a social sciences context. His 1990 publication on how covariates could be incorporated into log-linear models for social mobility has been widely applied in stratification research. His work on causal analysis led to a prize-winning demonstration that negative as well as positive selection into "treatments" would emerge when people used a mixture of behavioral decision rules. Several years before the idea entered mainstream empirical sociology and economics, DiPrete had published practical methods for sensitivity analysis in instrumental variables regression. DiPrete was a pioneer in the use of multilevel models to analyze longitudinal and repeated cross-sectional data, and he and his associates also pioneered techniques for harmonizing cross-national mobility data across multiple countries including the U.S., Germany, the Netherlands, and Sweden.

=== Comparative stratification systems ===
More of DiPrete's work focuses on comparative analyses of different countries' stratification, occupational, and welfare systems. DiPrete's research on occupational and educational linkages in Germany, France, and the United States found that both European countries had stronger linkages across different educational levels than the United States. The educational level and subject of study was a better predictor of occupation in Germany than any other country in the study, and was mainly determined by the country's educational system. In France and Germany, high schools are strongly separated and defined by field of study, and thus are better predictors of job outcomes. However, DiPrete and his collaborators argued that the United States' more flexible educational system can provide more job opportunities to workers, as they are less dependent on and restricted by their education.

DiPrete—with Patricia A. McManus, a professor at Indiana University—also researched how labor market and family composition influences household income in the US and Germany. German households are more resistant to depressions in both labor and family structure, partially because union dissolution and loss of employment are less frequent in Germany than the United States. Additionally, the German welfare system offers more protection to residents in the event of these depressions than does the American welfare system. The effect of trigger events depends on the tax and welfare system in the country in which it occurs, as well as the countries' labor and marriage markets. The research also outlined a classification system for various trigger events—like loss of job availability which can cause change in household income—for various societies. The United States, they identified, has a higher rate of "positive" trigger events (such as marriage or job promotion) which cause it to be a more mobile society than Germany. Conversely, the US also has a high rate of "negative" trigger events (ex. divorce or job loss), meaning increased possibility for downwards mobility. Germany, however, is more protected from both negative and positive triggers. Further, DiPrete and McManus found that trigger events can have secondary effects, like how upward mobility can trigger more mobility, and how job loss can increase the likelihood for divorce; these trends also vary by country.

=== Cumulative advantage and the Matthew effect ===
DiPrete has extensively studied cumulative advantage and its impact on career trajectories, especially regarding the idea of the Matthew effect. The Matthew effect is an idea by Robert K. Merton that explains his findings that early recognition leads to disproportionate reward in the future as early advantages lead to accumulation of future opportunities in the field of science. Meanwhile, other scientists would have much smaller abilities to attain advantageous opportunities if they were not initially recognized, making it harder for them to catch up. This applies as Merton saw that more recognized scientists get a disproportionate amount of credit and additional resources for their work while lesser known scientists get little credit for their comparable contributions.

Along similar lines, DiPrete extended this idea more generally as the sociological idea of cumulative advantage and researched its effect on inequality, especially in career development, as seen in sociological literature. Cumulative advantage is the idea that gaining minor initial advantages, like recognition, can lead to accruement and amplification of advantages over time, leading to disparities in future gains. This can be in various domains of life such as schooling, family and neighborhood, work and career, and other life processes like criminal careers. The example above on the Matthew Effect in the science field applies to DiPrete's studies of cumulative advantage, however, cumulative advantage applies more generally to any temporal process or life process where change happens over time. DiPrete uses cumulative advantage to describe a growing pattern of inequality, as it magnifies differences over time. DiPrete emphasizes that cumulative advantage leads to inequality since having an initial advantage would lead to resources being disproportionately allocated to those with recognition already, cutting off others building up their advantages. It becomes especially important to understand cumulative advantage in the workforce as his research shows that initial advantages can lead to differing career paths, abilities to grow careers, and inequalities in the workforce. This, in turn, perpetuates low social mobility and inequality.

=== Leapfrog theory ===
DiPrete discusses the concept of leapfrogging, which describes how a sharp jump in CEO compensation sharply increases the overall distribution of executive pay over time. More specifically, he uses this theory to experience the general increase of executive pay in the 1990s. DiPrete argues that CEOs regard other executives as peers, which helps determine their own compensation as it relates to rent. Further, CEOs with higher compensations are more likely to be regarded and selected by other CEOs as peers, since their higher salary affords them status and suggests they have influence when they might not. Leapfrogging describes the phenomenon of a small number of CEOs receiving sharp wage increases, which, in turn, increases the compensation of other executives. This ripple effect of other executives' salary increases ultimately increases the overall pay of the market, creating a new benchmark for which executives are to be compensated. DiPrete describes these subsequent rises as essential to ensure that CEOs are competitively compensated amongst their peers, and to prevent them from leaving to another corporation in which they can receive more pay.

DiPrete and his collaborators used data from ExecuComp data to demonstrate how average CEO salary has dramatically increased over time, as well as how CEOs experience much more mobility than the average worker. He was able to conclude that contrary to some scholars' belief that executive compensation was reflective of market performance, CEOs' pay was often driven by companies electing to pay their executives almost in the 50th to 75th percentile of salaries for their position. Further, DiPrete disagrees with observations that the sharp rise in executive salary is due to individual companies having weak governance, instead offering that the governance failure at one company can set a precedent among competitors where an overpaid CEO is viewed as the standard. Leapfrogging also has the potential for exponential increase in executive compensation, as firms seek to pay their executive above average salary. DiPrete's theory has been supported by observations of economists Michael Jensen and Kevin M. Murphy, who observed that companies do not increase CEO pay because of market performance, but rather social and political influences.

== Publications ==
=== Books ===
- The Rise of Women: The Growing Gender Gap in Education (2013, with Claudia Buchmann): This award-winning book explores why women have surpassed men in educational attainment and the broader effects on society, examining structural, cultural, and policy-driven influences on this shift.
- The Bureaucratic Labor Market: The Case of the Federal Civil Service (1989): This book examines career mobility, promotion systems, and inequality within the U.S. federal workforce, highlighting the structured yet constrained nature of bureaucratic labor markets.

=== Other publications ===
- A Half Century of Change in the Lives of American Women (2016, with Maratha Bailey): This edited volume examines how women's roles in work, education, and family life have evolved over 50 years, highlighting persistent inequalities and the factors shaping progress and setbacks
- Designing New Models for Explaining Family Change and Variation (2008, with S. Philip Morgan, Caroline Bledsoe, Suzanne M. Bianchi, P. Lindsay Chase-Lansdale, T DiPrete, V. Joseph Hotz, Seth Sanders, Judith A. Seltzer, and Duncan Thomas): This report provides recommendations for improving research on family dynamics and fertility, emphasizing interdisciplinary approaches to understanding demographic trends.
- European Labor Markets: Inequality, Governance, and Change (2005): This special issue analyzes labor market inequalities, employment policies, and governance structures across Europe, exploring how different systems manage economic change and inequality.
- Proceedings of the GOSEP 2000 International Conference (2001, with Elke Holst and Dean Lillard) – This special issue compiles research using the German Socio-Economic Panel, providing comparative perspectives on socio-economic trends and offering insights into labor economics, social mobility, and policy analysis.
- Discipline, Order and Student Behavior in American High Schools (1982, with Chandra Mueller and Nora Cate Schaeffer): This government study investigates school discipline policies and their effects on student behavior, providing empirical analysis of order and rule enforcement in high schools.

== Honors and awards ==
In 2008, DiPrete, along with Claudia Buchmann, received the James Coleman Award for Best Article in the field of Sociology of Education for their work and research on the growing female advantage in college education. For his book The Rise of Women: The Growing Gender Gap in Education and What It Means for American Schools, DiPrete was recognized with the Outstanding Book Award in the Inequality, Poverty, and Mobility section of the American Sociological Association. This book also won the Otis Dudley Duncan (Book) Award for Significant Contribution to Social Demography, awarded by the Section on Population of the American Sociological Association.

DiPrete was also named Robert M. Hauser Distinguished Scholar by the Inequality, Poverty, and Mobility section of the American Sociological Association in 2017.
