= Viviana Zelizer =

American sociologist (born 1946)

- Born: January 19, 1946 (age 80)
- Spouse: Gerald Zelizer
- Children: Julian Zelizer
- Relatives: Meg Jacobs (daughter-in-law)
- Scientific career
- Education: Rutgers University (BA); Columbia University (MA, MPhil, PhD)
- Known for: Economic sociology, relational sociology, cultural sociology, historical sociology, hostile worlds
- Fields: Sociology
- Workplaces: Princeton University
- Academic advisors: Sigmund Diamond; Bernard Barber; David Rothman; Robert K. Merton

Viviana A. Rotman Zelizer (born January 19, 1946) is an Argentine-American sociologist and the Lloyd Cotsen '50 Professor of Sociology at Princeton University. She is an economic sociologist who focuses on the attribution of cultural and moral meaning to the economy. A constant theme in her work is the economic valuation of the sacred, as found in such contexts as life insurance settlements and economic transactions between sexual intimates. In 2006, she was elected to the PEN American Center. In 2007, she was elected to both the American Academy of Arts & Sciences and the American Philosophical Society.

== Early life and education ==
Viviana Zelizer was born on January 19, 1946, in Buenos Aires, to S. Julio Rotman and Rosita Weill de Rotman. She attended the University of Buenos Aires and studied law for two years. In 1967, she emigrated to the United States when she married her husband, Rabbi Gerald L. Zelizer, who had been Rabbi of Congregation Beth El in Buenos Aires from 1964 to 1966. Gerald became the rabbi of Congregation Neve Shalom in Metuchen, New Jersey for 45 years, from 1970 to 2015.

She attended Rutgers University, where she graduated Phi Beta Kappa, with a B.A. in 1971. She went on to graduate school in sociology at Columbia University where she received an MPhil, an M.A. in 1974, and a Ph.D. in sociology in 1977.

Zelizer has named four scholars at Columbia, who influenced her intellectual career: Sigmund Diamond, Bernard Barber, David Rothman, and Robert K. Merton. Diamond (whose PhD was in history) and Barber were her primary mentors in sociology, and Rothman in the history department. Zelizer has said that Merton was always present, but at a distance.

== Career ==
Zelizer's unique approach to sociology by way of social history was an initial burden, as she recounts:

I remember all too painfully an early interview for a job in a university sociology department during which my interrogators asked pointedly how my social historical research qualified as sociology at all.

From 1976 to 1978, she joined the Department of Sociology at Rutgers University. In 1976, she took an assistant professorship at Barnard College and Graduate Faculty of Columbia University. She advanced to full professor in 1985. In 1988, she moved to Princeton University, where she chaired the Department of Sociology from 1992 to 1996. In 2002, she was named the Lloyd Cotsen '50 Professor of Sociology.

From 1987 to 1988, she was a visiting scholar at the Russell Sage Foundation, where she met another visiting scholar, sociologist Charles Tilly. At Princeton, she interacted with influential colleagues Paul DiMaggio and Alejandro Portes, as well as Michael Katz, then at the University of Pennsylvania.

In 1996–1997, Zelizer was a John Simon Guggenheim Memorial Foundation Fellow and a National Endowment for the Humanities Fellow at the Institute for Advanced Study.

In 2001, she was elected the first chair of the newly created Economic Sociology section of the American Sociological Association. In 2001, she was elected a member of the Council of the section on Comparative/Historical Sociology of the ASA.

In 2003, the Economic Sociology section named its annual book prize the Viviana A. Zelizer Distinguished Book Award.

== Personal life ==
Zelizer's son, Julian Zelizer, joined Princeton's Department of History Public Affairs in 2007, becoming what is believed to be the first mother-son professorial team in Princeton's history.

== Awards ==
- 1985 C.W. Mills Award, Society for the Study of Social Problems, for Pricing the Priceless Child: The Changing Social Value of Children
- 1996 Culture Section Book Award, American Sociological Association, for The Social Meaning of Money

== Major works ==
- Economic Lives: How Culture Shapes the Economy, Princeton University Press. (2010). ISBN 978-0-691-13936-4
- The Purchase of Intimacy, Princeton University Press. (2005). ISBN 0-691-12408-6
- The Social Meaning of Money: Pin Money, Paychecks, Poor Relief, and Other Currencies, Basic Books. (1994). ISBN 0-465-07891-5
- Pricing the Priceless Child: The Changing Social Value of Children, Princeton University Press. (1985). ISBN 0-691-03459-1
- Morals and Markets: The Development of Life Insurance in the United States, Columbia University Press. (1979). ISBN 0-231-04570-0
