= Institute for Social and Economic Research and Policy =

Research institute at Columbia University, USA

Coordinates: 40.807792°N 73.959671°W

- Formation: 1944
- Founder: Paul F. Lazarsfeld
- Location: New York City, New York, U.S.
- Director: Thomas DiPrete; Matthew Connelly
- Parent organization: Columbia University
- Website: https://www.iserp.columbia.edu/

The Institute for Social and Economic Research and Policy (ISERP) is the research arm of the social sciences at Columbia University, formerly known as the Paul F. Lazarsfeld Center for the Social Sciences. ISERP works to produce pioneering social science research and to shape public policy by integrating knowledge and methods across the social scientific disciplines. ISERP organizes an active intellectual community at Columbia University through its Faculty Fellows program, research centers, projects, and training initiatives.

== History ==
ISERP is the direct descendant of the Bureau of Applied Social Research (BASR), established at Columbia University in 1944 by sociologist Paul F. Lazarsfeld. One of the first social science institutes in the nation, the Bureau made landmark contributions to communications research, public opinion polling, organizational studies, and social science methodology. BASR's tradition was carried on by the Paul F. Lazarsfeld Center for the Social Sciences, established in 1976 after Lazarsfeld's death and later renamed to honor him. Under directors Harold W. Watts, Jonathan Cole, and Harrison White, the Lazarsfeld Center expanded its interdisciplinary reach and established particular strengths in the sociology of science and network analysis.

The Lazarsfeld Center for the Social Sciences was one of the centers incorporated into the Institute at its founding in 1999 as the Institute for Social and Economic Theory and Research (ISETR). Also joining ISETR were the Center for Urban Research and Policy, founded in 1992, and several new research centers. In January 2001, ISETR merged with the Office of Sponsored Research to become the Institute for Social and Economic Research and Policy.

The institute is currently led by professors Thomas DiPrete and Matthew Connelly.

== Fellowship ==
The fellowship of ISERP is drawn from faculty of the departments of Anthropology, Economics, History, Political Science, Psychology, Sociology, and Statistics, as well as of Barnard College, the Earth Institute, Teachers College, the Mailman School of Public Health and the Schools of Architecture, Planning and Preservation, Business, International and Public Affairs, Law, and Social Work.

== Centers and Major Projects ==
The Institute contains fifteen research centers and major projects that conduct basic research, develop policy initiatives, and train graduate students and postdoctoral fellows.

- American Institutions Project
  - The American Institutions Project focuses on Congress, regional issues, the treasury, and the military.
- Applied Statistics Center
  - The Applied Statistics Center is a community of scholars at Columbia organized around research projects in the human, social, and engineering sciences, as well as basic statistical research. It is directed by Andrew Gelman.
- Center for Intersectionality and Social Policy Studies
  - The Center for Intersectionality and Social Policy Studies functions as a research entity and a site for intellectual dialogue and collaboration for academics who are committed to analyzing the dynamics of complex inequity and stratification, as well as to policy and legal advocacy. It is directed by Kimberlé Crenshaw.
- Center for Research on Environmental Decisions (CRED)
  - CRED studies decision making under climate uncertainty and risk. Its objectives address the human responses to climate change and climate variability.
- Center for the Study of Democracy, Toleration, and Religion (CDTR)
  - CDTR, opened in 2006, conducts research and training on the tensions between religion, toleration, and democracy.
- Center for the Study of Wealth and Inequality (CWI)
  - CWI investigates the economic well-being of families and societal inequality. It interests encompass family welfare and standard of living as well.
- Center on Organizational Innovation (COI)
  - COI promotes research on organizational innovation as well as new forms of collaboration, communication, and coordination made possible with the advent of interactive technologies.
- Columbia Center for the Study of Development Strategies
  - The Center for the Study of Development Strategies provides a forum at Columbia to support rigorous field based research on major questions in the political economy of development.
- Columbia Program for Indian Economic Policies(PIEP)
  - PIEP is led by Jagdish Bhagwati and Arvind Panagariya. The Program brings together scholars from Columbia and other universities and think tanks around the world. The program houses a data center on India's economy and organizes lectures, seminars, and conferences in the U.S. and India.
- Initiative for Policy Dialogue (IPD)
  - IPD, led by Nobel laureate Joseph E. Stiglitz, helps developing countries respond to globalization.
- Paul F. Lazarsfeld Center for the Social Sciences
  - The Lazarsfeld Center, the oldest of the ISERP centers, is the catalyst for new research through its sponsorship of workshops, seminars, and conferences. The center is well known for playing a central role in the development of social network analysis and relational sociology.
- Interdisciplinary Center for Innovative Theory and Empirics (INCITE)
  - "cultivates public intelligence concerning socially and culturally vital ideas that can be advanced by research, education and conversation at the interdisciplinary seams that the social sciences share with the humanities, the sciences and one another"
  - "INCITE creates knowledge for public action."
- Public Opinion Project (POP)
  - The Public Opinion Project (POP) examines trends in public opinion, public policy, and political leadership in the United States.
- Roundtable on the Sexual Politics of Black Churches
  - This project convenes a team of sixteen African American scholars and religious leaders for a series of three convenings over a period of seventeen months.
- The Global Health Research Center of Central Asia
  - Columbia University's Global Health Research Center of Central Asia brings together multidisciplinary expertise from Columbia, Central Asia and the surrounding region to address a range of global health challenges: HIV/AIDS, sexually transmitted infections (STIs), hepatitis C, substance abuse, malnutrition, mental health and other threats to health.
- Understanding Autism Project
  - Autism is a condition characterized by impairments in communication, social interaction, and stereotyped or repetitive behaviors. No one knows with certainty what has caused autism prevalence—which has increased roughly ten-fold in the past forty years—to increase so precipitously. This group looks explores this increase.
