= David Rothman (medical historian) =

American medical historian (1937–2020)

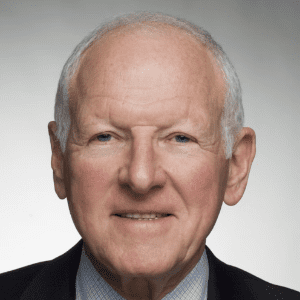
- David-Rothman
- Born: April 30, 1937
- Died: August 31, 2020 (aged 83)
- Education: Columbia University (BA); Harvard University (PhD)
- Medical career
- Profession: Historian; Historian as Protagonist
- Field: American History; Social History; History of medicine
- Institutions: Columbia University; Columbia Medical School

David Jay Rothman (April 30, 1937 − August 31, 2020) was professor of History at Columbia University and of Social Medicine at Columbia University College of Physicians and Surgeons. He founded and served as the president of the Institute on Medicine as a Profession (IMAP). Rothman's work focused on American social history, the history of medicine and current health care practices. His research also explored human rights in medicine, including organ trafficking, AIDS, and the ethics of research in developing countries.

== Education ==
Rothman earned his B.A. from Columbia University in 1958 and a Ph.D. from Harvard University in 1964.

== Career ==
After earning his Ph.D., Rothman returned to Columbia and rose to the rank of Professor of History by 1971.

In 1971 Rothman published The Discovery of the Asylum, which explores mental hospitals, prisons, and almshouses. The book was co-winner of the Albert J. Beveridge Award of the American Historical Association. According to a 2019 review, the book "effectively launched the contemporary field of prison history. Rothman traced the first modern prisons' (1820s–1850s) roots to the post-Revolution social turmoil and reformers' desire for perfectly ordered spaces."

In 2000 Rothman published Medical Professionalism; Focusing on the Real Issues. With an endowment from the Open Society Institute and George Soros, Rothman founded the Institute on Medicine as a Profession (IMAP) in 2003. He and Sheila Rothman co-authored Marketing HPV Vaccine, which was published in 2009. Also in 2009, Professional Medical Associations and Their Relationships with Industry: A Proposal for Controlling Conflicts of Interest was published.

He also co-authored From Disclosure to Transparency: The Use of Company Payment Data, published in 2010. Medical Communication Companies and Industry Grants was published in 2013 and Political Polarization of Physicians in the United States: An Analysis of Campaign Contributions to Federal Elections, 1991 Through 2012 in 2014.

=== Task forces ===
Rothman co-chaired two task forces. The recommendations of these task forces were published in 2006 in The Journal of the American Medical Association under the title Health Industry Practices that Create Conflicts of Interest: A Policy Proposal for Academic Medical Centers.

Together with the Open Society Foundations, Rothman convened a task force to address physician involvement in detention, interrogation, and torture. A resulting report entitled Ethics Abandoned: Medical Professionalism and Detainee Abuse in the War on Terror was published in November 2013.

== Personal life ==
Rothman lived in New York City with his wife, with whom he frequently co-authored publications. He had two children. He also had two grandchildren who he loved dearly.

== Publications ==
- Politics and Power: The United States Senate, 1869-1901 (1966)
- The Discovery of the Asylum (1971)
- Conscience and Convenience: The Asylum and Its Alternatives in Progressive America (1980)
- The Willowbrook Wars (1984, co-authored with Sheila Rothman)
- Strangers at the Bedside: A History of How Law and Bioethics Transformed Medical Decision-making (1991)
- Medicine and Western Civilization (1995, co-edited with Steven Marcus and Stephanie Kiceluk)
- Beginnings Count: The Technological Imperative in American Health Care (1997)
- The Pursuit of Perfection: The Promise and Perils of Medical Enhancement (2003, co-authored with Sheila Rothman)
- Trust Is Not Enough (2006, co-authored with Sheila Rothman)
- Medical Professionalism in the New Information Age (2010, co-edited with David Blumenthal)
- Incarceration and its Alternatives in 20th Century America November (1979)
