= Sociological Theory (journal) =

- Discipline: Sociology
- Language: English
- Edited by: Iddo Tavory

Publication details
- History: 1983–present
- Publisher: SAGE Publications
- Frequency: Quarterly
- Impact factor: 2.703 (2020)

Standard abbreviations
- ISO 4: Sociol. Theory

Indexing
- ISSN: 0735-2751 (print); 1467-9558 (web)
- LCCN: 83643448
- JSTOR: 07352751
- OCLC no.: 802328763

Links
- Journal homepage; Online access; Online archive

Sociological Theory is a peer-reviewed journal published by SAGE Publications for the American Sociological Association. The journal's purpose is to cover the full breadth of sociological theory. The editor-in-chief is Iddo Tavory (New York University). According to the Journal Citation Reports, the journal has a 2020 impact factor of 2.703, ranking it 17th out of 150 journals in the category "Sociology".
