= Cross-cutting cleavage =

Accord between otherwise divided groups

In social sciences, a cross-cutting cleavage exists when groups on one cleavage overlap among groups on another cleavage. "Cleavages" may include racial, political, and religious divisions in society. Formally, members of a group j on a given cleavage x belong to groups on a second cleavage y with members of other groups k, l, m, etc. from the first cleavage x. For example, if a society contained two ethnic groups that had equal proportions of rich and poor it would be cross-cutting. Robert A. Dahl built a theory of Pluralist democracy which is a direct descendant of Madison's cross-cutting cleavages. Cross-cutting cleavages are contrasted with reinforcing cleavage (e.g. a situation where one ethnic group is all-rich and the other is all-poor). The term originates from Simmel (1908) in his work Soziologie.

== Definition ==
In social sciences, a cross-cutting cleavage exists when groups on one cleavage overlap among groups on another cleavage. "Cleavages" may include racial, political, religious divisions in society. Formally, members of a group j on a given cleavage x belong to groups on a second cleavage y with members of other groups k, l, m, etc. from the first cleavage x. For example, if a society contained two ethnic groups that had equal proportions of rich and poor it would be cross-cutting.

== History ==
=== Political philosophy ===
Cross-cutting cleavages are perhaps most heavily referenced in political philosophy. James Madison's commentary on the concept in Federalist No. 10 contributed substantially to the development of the idea of cross-cutting cleavages. Madison argued the fractious nature of factions would be a mechanism for political stability and prevent a tyranny of the majority. Because no group can align all members along a single cleavage, they will instead be forced to build a broad base of support by seeking the approval of many different factions, preventing a simple "majority dictatorship" where one group making up a bare majority could (for example) expropriate all the property of another group.

An in-depth discussion of this process is given by Seymour Martin Lipset in his 1960 book Political Man.

Cross-cutting theory was applied to such topics as social order, political violence, voting behaviour, political organization and democratic stability, for example Truman's The Governmental Process, Dahl's A Preface to Democratic Theory, among others. Around the same time, several scholars (including Lipset himself) suggested ways to measure the concept, the best-known being Rae and Taylor's in their 1970 book The Analysis of Political Cleavages. Due to data limitations, these theories were generally left untested for a couple of decades.

=== Sociology ===
The term originates from Simmel (1908) in his work Soziologie. Anthropologists used the term heavily in the first few decades of the 20th century, as they brought back descriptions of non-Western societies throughout Asia and Africa. Peter Blau's work further refined the idea.

Stein Rokkan wrote a classic essay on cross-cutting cleavages in Norway.

Diana Mutz revived the concept in the early 2000s, looking at political participation and democratic theory using survey data in the US and other Western European democracies.

Several scholars have written on how cross-cutting cleavages relates to ethnic voting, civil war, and ethnic censuses.

In 2011, Selway suggested a new measure relevant to economic growth for crosscutting cleavages and published a crossnational dataset on crosscutting cleavages among several dimensions (ethnicity, class, geography and religion).

Desmet, Ortuño-Ortín and Wacziarg (2017), in the American Economic Review, derive and discuss several measures of cross-cuttingness and compute them using data on ethnic identity and cultural values.

== See also ==
- Federalist No. 10
- Cleavage (politics)
- Intersectionality
- Wedge issue
