= Stein Rokkan Memorial Lecture =

The Stein Rokkan Memorial Lecture is an annual lecture which is arranged by the Department of Comparative Politics (Norwegian: Institutt for sammenliknende politikk) at the University of Bergen, Norway. Since 2002, the organising of the lecture has been in cooperation with the UNI Rokkan Centre. The purpose of the lecture is to draw attention to some of the most outstanding exponents of Stein Rokkan’s fields of research; first and foremost political science, sociology and comparative politics.

== Rokkan lecturers ==
- 1981 Erik Allardt
- 1982 William J. M. Mackenzie
- 1983 Peter Flora
- 1984 Robert A. Dahl
- 1985 Shmuel N. Eisenstadt
- 1986 Reinhard Bendix
- 1987 Henry Valen
- 1988 Juan J. Linz
- 1989 Max Kaase
- 1990 Johan Galtung
- 1991 Hans Daalder
- 1992 Seymour Martin Lipset
- 1993 Charles Tilly
- 1994 Jens Alber
- 1995 Peter Mair
- 1996 Hans-Dieter Klingemann
- 1997 Derek Urwin
- 1998 Peter H. Merkl
- 1999 William Miller
- 2000 Stefano Bartolini
- 2001 Øyvind Østerud
- 2002 Theda Skocpol
- 2003 Ólafur Ragnar Grímsson
- 2004 Pippa Norris
- 2005 Johan P. Olsen
- 2007 Frances Fox Piven
- 2008 Mark N. Franklin
- 2009 Adam Przeworski
- 2010 Bo Rothstein
- 2011 Robert D. Putnam
- 2012 Margaret Levi
- 2013 Donatella della Porta
- 2014 Herbert Kitschelt
- 2015 Lee Epstein
- 2016 Liesbet Hooghe and Gary Marks
- 2017 Maurizio Ferrera
- 2018 Kathleen Thelen
- 2019 Hanspeter Kriesi
- 2020 Cancelled due to Covid-19 pandemic
- 2021 Lars Mjøset
- 2022 Sheri Berman
- 2023 Daniele Caramani
