= Cleavage (politics) =

Sociological concept

Cleavages in West European societies according to Lipset & Rokkan

In political science and sociology, a cleavage is a historically determined social or cultural line which divides citizens within a society into groups with differing political interests, resulting in political conflict among these groups. Social or cultural cleavages thus become political cleavages once they get politicized as such. Cleavage theory accordingly argues that political cleavages predominantly determine a country's party system as well as the individual voting behavior of citizens, dividing them into voting blocs. These blocs are distinguished by similar socio-economic characteristics, who vote and view the world in a similar way. It is distinct from other common political theories on voting behavior in the sense that it focuses on aggregate and structural patterns instead of individual voting behaviors.

Classical cleavage theories have generally been focused on the persistence of dominant conflicts within national political systems over the course of history. Political sociologists Seymour Martin Lipset and Stein Rokkan (1967) for example used the term in their often cited essay on cleavage structures in West European politics. In their essay, the authors argue how the European party systems at their time of writing were still largely based on the social and cultural cleavages that characterized European societies a century earlier. They therefore argue that these 'frozen party systems' can be seen as political expressions of historically determined societal divisions.

Although some authors have claimed that the cleavages in Lipset and Rokkan's theory are still dominant for contemporary voting behaviors in Western Europe, others have argued that these traditional cleavages have become less important and new conflict lines have emerged. Conflicts that have emerged around several new political cleavages are for example cultural, such as conflicts over integration and multiculturalism, or environmental, such as ongoing politics over climate change.

== Frozen party systems ==
The cleavages in Lipset and Rokkan's classical theory have its origins in two developments in 19th century Western Europe. On the one hand, European societies at the time saw a period of so-called national revolutions. These events were revolutionary as the centralized state came to take over political roles that had formerly been assigned to decentralized and/or religious communities. According to Lipset and Rokkan, these historical national revolutions gave rise to the following two societal and political cleavages:

- Centre versus periphery: between elites in the central administrative areas and those in more outlying areas. This usually expresses itself in terms of regional nationalism. For example, in Spain many regions have regionalist or separatist parties. This division is, according to Lipset and Rokkan, caused by the creation of modern nation-states, where some states were better than others at assimilating other cultures into the majority nation.
- State versus church: between religious and secular voters. In the Netherlands until the 1970s there were five major parties: the Catholic People's Party (KVP), the Protestant Anti-Revolutionary Party (ARP) and Christian Historical Union (CHU), the social democratic Labour Party (PvdA), and the liberal People's Party for Freedom and Democracy (VVD), the last two being secular.

On the other hand, the authors claim that the Industrial Revolution also generated two persistent cleavages:

- Owner versus worker: a class cleavage, causing the formation of parties of the left and parties of the right. This cleavage was particularly present in Western countries. It concerned mostly economical conflicts, such as the choice between Keynesian economics and Liberal economics. Sometimes it is argued that this cleavage represents a conflict between the rich and poor. Various parties have claimed to represent either interest, though this may or may not be genuine. Socialist parties such as the British Labour Party, Argentinian Socialist Party and the Swedish Democratic Workers' Party represent the left while the British Conservative Party and the Republican Party in the United States represent the right.
- Land versus industry: Conflict between industrial and agricultural sectors on trade policies such as continued state exercise of control over tariffs, against freedom of control for industrial enterprise. This creates agrarian and peasant parties such as the Australian Country Party, Finnish Centre Party and Polish Peasants People's Party.

Lipset and Rokkan claim that the political parties that emerged in Western Europe during the end of the 19th and beginning of the 20th century were formed on the base of these structural cleavages in societies. At the time of writing their essay (1967), they observed that these party systems had, for the biggest part, not changed. Parties then still seemed to be based on the aforementioned four cleavages, making many European party systems seem 'frozen'. The main explanation they give for this is that with the development of labor parties as well as the introduction of universal suffrage at the beginning of the 20th century all groups of civil society were in a way represented in the political arenas of these states. According to Paul Pierson, the account by Lipset and Rokkan typifies path dependence, as cleavages at particular critical junctures led to stable party systems. Barbara Geddes extended Lipset and Rokkan's argument to Latin American states, finding that Lipset and Rokkan's argument did not successfully explain the party systems there even though the cases were consistent with the initial conditions outlined by Lipset and Rokkan in their study of mostly European party stems.

There have been noteworthy exceptions to Lipset and Rokkan's theory of Western European party systems, however. As the authors claim, the fascist or national-socialist authoritarian politics of for example Spain, Italy and Germany were not based on these historical cleavages. Thus, not all Western European states had had 'frozen party systems' for the period concerned.

== New cleavages ==
From the 1960s onwards, the party systems discussed in Lipset and Rokkan's theory partially 'unfroze' as the traditional cleavages seemed to become less deterministic for voting behaviors than before. In political science, this is termed dealignment. The arguments for the causes of dealignment are varied. One argument is that the importance of the religious cleavage, for example, has significantly declined because of widespread secularization. A second theory is one linked to class affiliations. Historically, those who identify as working class would tend to vote for left or left leaning parties, while those in a stronger economic position would vote for parties on the right of the political spectrum. Ronald Inglehart argues that the rise of affluence, particularly in the middle classes, has led to voting behaviour and party affiliations no longer being primarily based on class. While this brings into question the continued existence of the Left-Right cleavage, it also leaves room for voters to base their vote on factors other than class, such a concerns regarding the environment or immigration.

A third explanation for dealignment of cleavages is a top-down approach. Rather than voters being the cause of the breaking down of the Left-Right divide, it is actually caused by political parties themselves. In an attempt to appeal to a wider variety of voters it has been argued that parties on both sides of the political spectrum have consciously moved their policy further toward the centre ground, ensuring the support of a wider variety of voters that transcends class divisions. As a result of this, some authors argue that from this period onwards cleavages have therefore lost their overall importance for political outcomes.

However, other scholars have argued that new cleavages have replaced the traditional ones and have become determinants for political outcomes (realignment), emphasizing the persisting value of cleavage theory for political science and sociology. As argued by several scholars, the following new political cleavages have seemed to gain importance in the late 20th and early 21st century:

- Winners versus losers of globalization: a cleavage introduced by political sociologist Hanspeter Kriesi. This cleavage has emerged because globalization supposedly affects citizens within Western European states differently. Due to the increased global circulation of goods and services, migration rates have increased and low-income jobs have partially been relocated to low-income settings. Accordingly, globalization creates a distinction between those in the post-industrial sectors that profit from a globalized economy and the opening of labor markets (the 'winners') versus those in sectors negatively affected by cheap labor influxes (the 'losers'). This new cleavage differs from the traditional class cleavage in the sense that it is not about a division between who owns the means of production (capitalist) versus who does not (laborer). Rather, it is a cleavage between who is part of the sector that profits from globalization and open borders versus who is excluded from these sectors. Kriesi et al. (2008) therefore argue that this cleavage has largely become politicized over conflicts such as integration, Europeanization, open border policies and multiculturalism. For the 'losers', this new cleavage may for instance translate itself into welfare chauvinism, which could reinforce support for populist protest parties that favor trade barriers to protect local manufacturing and 'locals first' policies in the labor market. This ideology is represented by political parties such as the UK Independence Party, National Rally in France and Danish People's Party.
- Materialism versus post-materialism: this cleavage stems from post-materialist theory by political scientist Ronald Inglehart. In his theory, Inglehart hypothesizes that a political cleavage emerges between generations over policy priorities due to different sets of values. On the one hand Inglehart claims that mostly younger generations, such as the 'generation X', have developed post-materialist values such as belonging, self-expression and the overall quality of life. These values can for example be translated politically in policies for fair trade, peace, environmental protection and solidarity for low-income countries, resulting in potential support for political parties such as Die Grünen (Alliance 90/The Greens) in Germany, Pirate Party UK and Women's Equality Party in the UK. Such post-materialism ideology contradicts the materialist values of physical sustenance and safety, which is supposedly held by older generations. These values could be translated into policies in favor of national security, protection of private property, tradition and authority within the family and the state.

In some 21st century Western European countries like Austria, Denmark, Norway and Switzerland, a new cultural divide is suggested to have arisen, challenging the old primary political cleavage over economic conflicts. This transformation has occurred since the late 1960s, with the New Left that arose in this period espousing libertarian and universalistic values, and a populist right reaction arising from the 1980s espousing traditionalist and communitarian ones. This is known as Populism and many examples from the 2020s can be highlighted: the election of several populist presidents and parties (Erdogan in Turkey, Trump in the US, The Five Stars Movement in Italy), the vote of citizens (the 2016-UK-referendum leading to the Brexit). This can be explained by the rise of the influence of values upon voting behavior. Citizens do not only take into account economics parameters, but also cultural ones. This new trend, the Authoritarian populist-Libertarian pluralist cleavage, is slowly replacing the former Western-countries political cleavage which is the Left-Right fight. The term for this new cleavage was coined by Pippa Norris and Ronald Inglehart. It has been argued that the pattern that can be seen emerging in terms of election outcomes in America and across Europe is as a result of this new cleavage.

- Authoritarian Populists: Those who align with this cleavage share are usually socially conservative and working class, leading them to lean towards voting for right wing parties. Authoritarian populists share a view of elites as untrustworthy and hold their leadership in very high regard. In terms of political values, this cleavage puts emphasis on conformity, nationalism and security.
- Liberal Pluralists: Liberal pluralists also tend to be working class but hold core liberal values. In contrast to the authoritarian populists, liberal pluralists are usually in favour of immigration and diversity and hold experts in high esteem. In a British context, a liberal pluralist would be pro-membership of the European Union. Supporting marginalised groups and minority rights are of high importance.

In terms of electoral outcomes and emerging patterns in voting behaviour, Pippa Norris and Ronald Inglehart argue that both the rise of populism, and this new cleavage can be used to explain why the United Kingdom voted to leave the European Union in 2016, and President Donald Trump's successful bid for the American presidency the same year.

According to Robert Ford and Will Jennings, new cleavages are forming in Western democracies around education, age, geography, and attitudes to immigration. These cleavages were made politically salient due to increased ethnic diversity and certain structural economic changes for advanced economies in the last decades. However, Raul Gomez argues that, while structural changes can increase the salience of cultural issues, their actual political consequences will depend on how individual political parties respond to them.

== See also ==
- Class conflict
- Cross-cutting cleavage
- Psephology
- Urban–rural political divide
- Wedge issue
- Political party
- Voting blocs
