= Wedge strategy (diplomacy) =

Wedge strategy in diplomacy is used to prevent, divide, weaken an adversary coalition

Wedge strategies in diplomacy are used to prevent, divide, and weaken an adversary coalition. Wedge strategies can take the shape of reward-based or coercive strategies. Alignment abnormalities can arise because of wedge strategies.

Wedge strategies may be a subset or similar to divide and rule strategies, however, there may be a slight optical difference. With the divide and rule strategy, there is a clear winner, whereas with the wedge strategy, attention is not focused on the winner but instead against the discredited coalition.

== US examples ==
- 1948: George Kennan argued that the United States should "wean a Chinese coalition government from the Soviets"
- 1952 CIA's national covert strategy objective "should be to drive a wedge between the Communist government of China and the Communist government of the USSR to the point where hostilities actually break out or are on the constant verge of breaking out...so that they are no longer a menace to the West and to their Asiatic neighbors."

== Great Britain examples ==
- 1930s: Great Britain's defensive attempts to accommodate Italy
- 1940–1941: Great Britain used a wedge strategy to keep Spain from entering World War II on the side of the Axis

== Soviet examples ==
- 1950: Moscow inciting Mao to actions guaranteed to sustain Sino-American friction

== Russian examples ==
- 2016: Interference by Russia in the UK Brexit referendum, driving wedges between the EU member states

== Contemporary Chinese examples ==
- Against the Australia-US alliance
- Against the EU
  - Against the EU-US alliance
- Against the Japan-US alliance
- Against the Pakistan-US alliance
- Against the Philippines-US alliance
- Against the ROK-US alliance
  - Against the ROK-Japan-US security trilateral
- Against the Taiwan-US alliance
- Against the Vietnam-US partnership

== See also ==
- Wedge issue
