= Daniele Caramani =

Political scientist

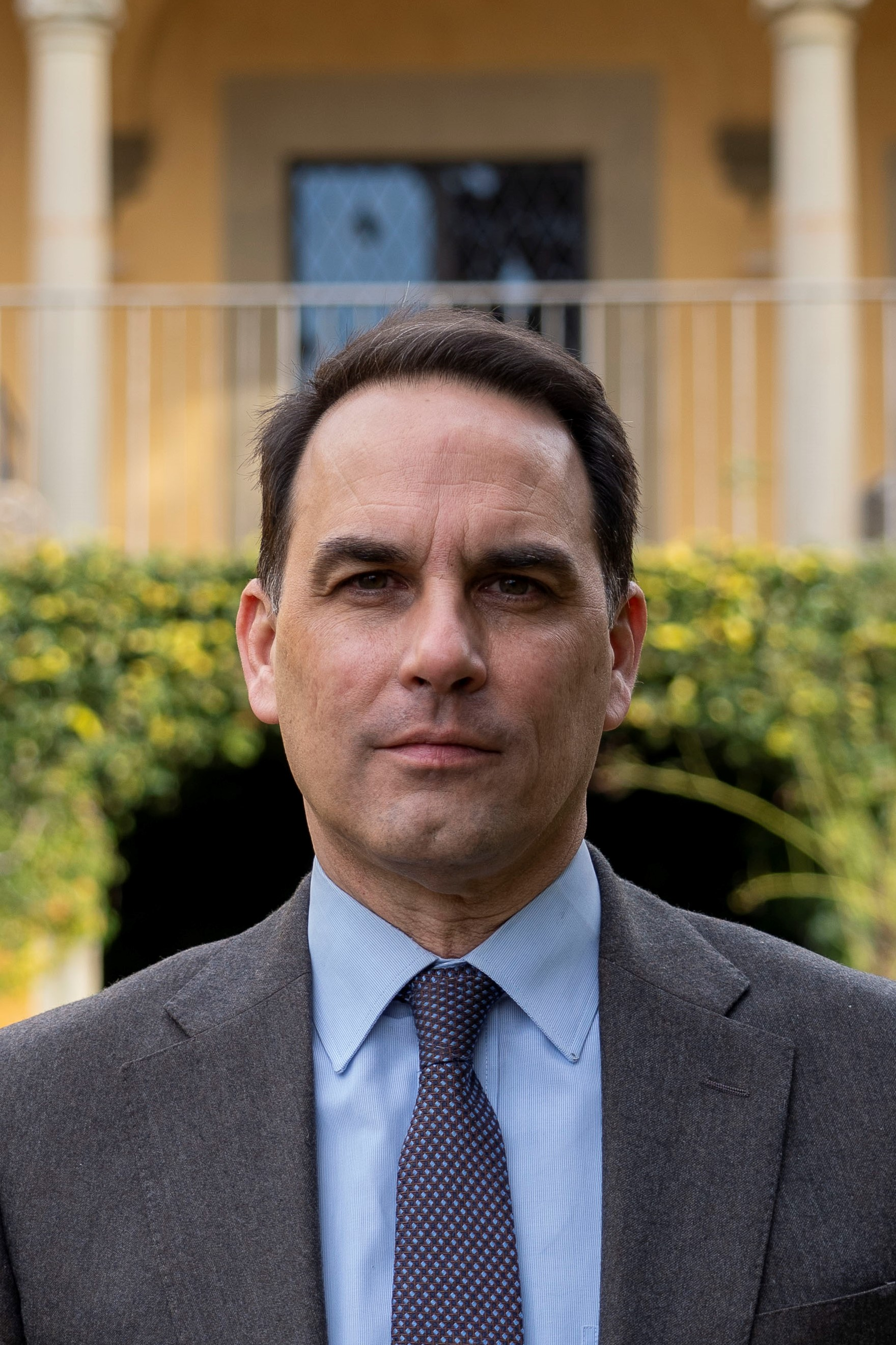
Daniele Caramani in Villa Schifanoia, Robert Schuman Centre for Advanced Studies, European University Institute, Florence, in 2020.

Daniele Caramani (Milan, 26 June 1968) is a comparative political scientist.

== Education ==
Daniele Caramani grew up in Milan and Paris. He holds a baccalauréat (international option) from the Lycée International de Saint-Germain-en-Laye. After the BA and MA at the University of Geneva, he obtained his Ph.D. at the European University Institute, Florence. He attended the Essex and Michigan methods summer schools.

== Academic career ==
Caramani started his career in 1991 at the University of Geneva as teaching assistant in methods and comparative politics. He was a researcher at the Mannheim Centre for European Social Research (1996−1998) and then assistant professor at the University of Florence until 2002. In 2000−2002 he was Vincent Wright Fellow at the Robert Schuman Centre for Advanced Studies. In 2002 he returned to Mannheim. In 2004 he took up a position as Senior Lecturer / Reader at the University of Birmingham, UK. In 2006 he became a Professor of Comparative Politics at the University of St. Gallen, Switzerland. Since 2014, he is a professor at the University of Zurich holding the Chair of Comparative Politics. In 2020 he was appointed Ernst B. Haas Chair at the European University Institute, Florence (on leave from the University of Zurich), where he directs the European Governance and Politics Programme at the Robert Schuman Centre for Advanced Studies.

He has been a Jemolo Fellow at Nuffield College (Oxford University), a visiting fellow at the Stein Rokkan Centre in Bergen, Norway, and a visiting professor at the European University Institute, Florence, and Australian National University, Canberra (2019-2020).

== Works ==
Caramani’s work is comparative and historical with quantitative time series reaching back to the formation of political cleavages during phases of mass democratization, state formation, nationalism and industrialization in the 19th century. It includes research on elections, representation and electoral geography, parties and party systems, methodology, European integration and globalization.

His main work analyses the interplay between territorial and functional cleavages at the national, European and global levels. His book The Nationalization of Politics (Cambridge University Press 2004) was awarded the Stein Rokkan Prize for Comparative Social Science Research. His book The Europeanization of Politics (Cambridge University Press 2015) extends the analysis to Europe. Current work analyses global cleavages with an ERC Advanced Grant project (GLOBAL).

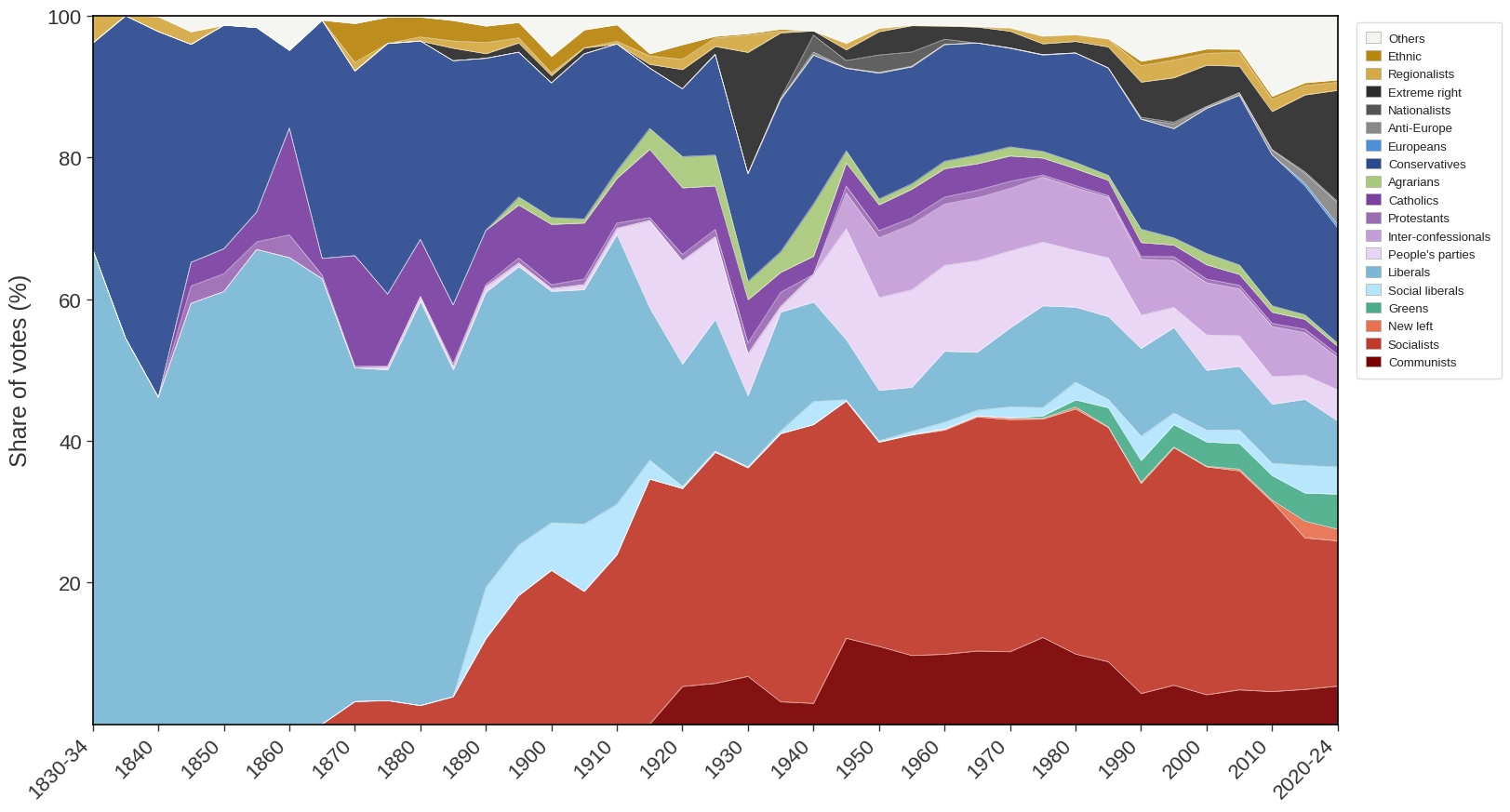
Depiction of the evolution of the European party system from the 1830s to 2025 updated from Caramani's book "The Europeanization of Politics". (2015).

Caramani’s empirical approach is based on comparative and quantitative-statistical methods, and has produced datasets and archives. He is the author of Elections in Western Europe since 1815: Electoral Results by Constituencies (Palgrave 2000, with CD-ROM), later expanded into a data archive of which he is Co-Director: the Constituency-Level Elections Archive (CLEA) has received the APSA award in 2012. The latest release covers historically over 2,025 elections from 180 countries, with GeoReferenced Electoral Districts (GRED) with 167 historical maps from 74 countries.

Other work includes research on political representation and transnational voting rights.

Caramani’s work follows closely Stein Rokkan’s legacy. He also translated into Italian State Formation, Nation-Building, and Mass Politics in Europe: The Theory of Stein Rokkan (Oxford University Press 1999) and wrote two chapters on Rokkan’s theory. In 2023 he held the Stein Rokkan Memorial Lecture.

On methodology, he authored Introduction to the Comparative Method with Boolean Algebra (Sage, Quantitative Applications in the Social Sciences 2009).

For a student readership, Caramani edits the textbook Comparative Politics (Oxford University Press 2023, sixth edition). With unparalleled comparative empirical material, this is the most comprehensive introduction to comparative politics, written by the leading experts in the field.

== Awards ==
- Stein Rokkan Prize for Comparative Social Science Research, 2004.
- Lijphart-Przeworski-Verba Dataset Award from Comparative Politics section of the American Political Science Association, 2012.
- Vincent Wright Memorial Prize for best article in West European Politics, 2006.

== Selected bibliography ==
Books

- The Europeanization of Politics: The Formation of a European Electorate and Party System in Historical Perspective. Cambridge: Cambridge University Press. 2015
- The Nationalization of Politics: The Formation of National Electorates and Party Systems in Western Europe. Cambridge: Cambridge University Press, 2004
- Introduction to the Comparative Method with Boolean Algebra. Beverly Hills, Calif.: Sage (Quantitative Applications in the Social Sciences), 2009
- Elections in Western Europe since 1815: Electoral Results by Constituencies [supplemented with CD-ROM]. London: Palgrave, 2000.

Edited volumes

- The Technocratic Challenge to Democracy. London: Routledge, 2020, with Eri Bertsou.
- Special symposium on The Nationalization of Electoral Politics: Frontiers of Research, Electoral Studies 47(1), 511–45, 2017, with Ken Kollman.
- Voting Rights in the Age of Globalization. London: Routledge, 2015, with Florian Grotz.
- Challenges to Consensual Politics. Brussels: Lang, 2005, with Yves Mény.

Textbook

- Comparative Politics. Oxford: Oxford University Press, 2023, sixth edition.

Articles

- With Siyana Gurova and Tobias Widmann. The Evolution of Global Cleavages: A Historical Analysis of Territorial and Functional World Alignments Based on Automated Text Analysis, 1843–2020. Comparative Political Studies, 2024, https://doi.org/10.1177/00104140241271
- A Cleavage-Based Conceptualisation of Politicised Global Integration. Journal of European Public Policy, 2024, https://doi.org/10.1080/13501763.2024.2309197
- With Eri Bertsou. People Haven’t Had Enough of Experts: Measuring Technocratic Attitudes among Citizens in Nine European Countries. American Journal of Political Science, 2022, Vol. 66, No. 1, pp. 5-23.
- With Luca Manucci. National Past and Populism: The Re-Elaboration of Fascism and Its Impact on Right-Wing Populism in Western Europe. West European Politics, 2019, Vol. 42, No. 6, pp. 1159–87.
- Will vs. Reason: The Populist and Technocratic Forms of Representation and Their Critique to Party Government. American Political Science Review, 2017, Vol. 111, No. 1, pp. 54–67.
- With Florian Grotz. Beyond Citizenship and Residence? Exploring the Extension of Voting Rights in the Age of Globalization Democratization, 2015, Vol. 22, No. 5, pp. 799–819.
- The Europeanization of Electoral Politics: An Analysis of Converging Voting Distributions in 30 European Party Systems, 1970–2008. Party Politics, 2012, Vol. 18, No. 6, pp. 803–23.
- With Oliver Strijbis. Discrepant Electorates: The Inclusiveness of Electorates and Its Impact on the Representation of Citizens. Parliamentary Affairs, 2012, Vol. 65, No. 1, pp. 1–21.
- With Valeria Camia. Family Meetings: Ideological Convergence within Party Families Across Europe, 1945–2009. Comparative European Politics, 2011, Vol. 10, No. 1, pp. 48–85.
- Electoral Waves: An Analysis of Trends, Spread and Swings across 20 West European Countries 1970–2008. Representation, 2011, Vol. 47, No. 2, pp. 137–60.
- Of Differences and Similarities: Is the Explanation of Variation a Limitation to (or of) Comparative Analysis? European Political Science, 2010, Vol. 9, pp. 34–48.
- Is There a European Electorate and What Does It Look Like? Evidence from Electoral Volatility Measures, 1976–2004. West European Politics, 2006, Vol. 29, No. 1, pp. 1–27.
- The Formation of National Party Systems in Europe: A Comparative-Historical Analysis. Scandinavian Political Studies, 2005, Vol. 28, No. 4, pp. 295–322.
- The End of Silent Elections: The Birth of Electoral Competition, 1832–1915. Party Politics, 2003, Vol. 9, No. 4, pp. 411–43.
- With Simon Hug. The Literature on European Parties and Party Systems since 1945: A Quantitative Analysis. European Journal of Political Research, 1998, Vol. 33, No. 4, pp. 497–524.
- The Nationalisation of Electoral Politics: Conceptual Reconstruction and Review of the Literature. West European Politics, 1996, Vol. 19, No. 2, pp. 205–24.

Chapters

- Electoral Systems in Historical Political Economy, in Jenkins, Jeffery A. and Jared Rubin (eds.), The Oxford Handbook of Historical Political Economy. Oxford: Oxford University Press, 2023.
- Introduction: The Technocratic Challenge to Technocracy, in Bertsou, E. and Caramani, D. (eds.), The Technocratic Challenge to Democracy. London: Routledge, 2020.
- With Eri Bertsou. Measuring Technocracy, in Bertsou, E. and Caramani, D. (eds.), The Technocratic Challenge to Democracy. London: Routledge, 2020.
- Technocratic Representation, in Cotta, M. and Russo, F. (eds.), Handbook of Political Representation. Cheltenham: Edward Elgar, 2020.
- Introduction to Comparative Politics, in: Caramani D. (ed.). Comparative Politics. Oxford: Oxford University Press, 2023.
- Party Systems, in: Caramani, D. (ed.). Comparative Politics. Oxford: Oxford University Press, 2023.
- With Karen Celis and Bram Wauters. The Representation of Old and New Cleavages in Europe, in Deschouwer, K. and S. Depauw (eds.). Political Representation in the Twenty-First Century. Oxford: Oxford University Press, 2014
- Stein Rokkan: The Macro-Sociological Fresco of State, Nation and Democracy in Europe, in: Bull, M. et al. (eds.). Masters of Political Science (volume 2). London: Routledge, 2011.
- Rokkan, Stein, in: Kurian, G. (ed.). The Encyclopedia of Political Science. Washington, DC: CQ Press, 2010.
