= Comparative sociology =

Branch of the discipline of sociology

Comparative sociology involves comparison of the social processes between nation states, or across different types of society (for example capitalist and socialist). There are two main approaches to comparative sociology: some seek similarity across different countries and cultures whereas others seek variance. For example, structural Marxists have attempted to use comparative methods to discover the general processes that underlie apparently different social orderings in different societies. The danger of this approach is that the different social contexts are overlooked in the search for supposed universal structures.

One sociologist who employed comparative methods to understand variance was Max Weber, whose studies attempted to show how differences between cultures explained the different social orderings that had emerged (see for example The Protestant Ethic and the Spirit of Capitalism and Sociology of religion).

There is some debate within sociology regarding whether the label of 'comparative' is suitable. Emile Durkheim argued in The Rules of Sociological Method (1895) that all sociological research was in fact comparative since social phenomenon are always held to be typical, representative or unique, all of which imply some sort of comparison. In this sense, all sociological analysis is comparative and it has been suggested that what is normally referred to as comparative research, may be more appropriately called cross-national research.

== See also ==
- Reinhard Bendix
- Comparative historical research
- Historical institutionalism
- Historical sociology
- Structuration theory
