= University of Bergen Department of Comparative Politics =

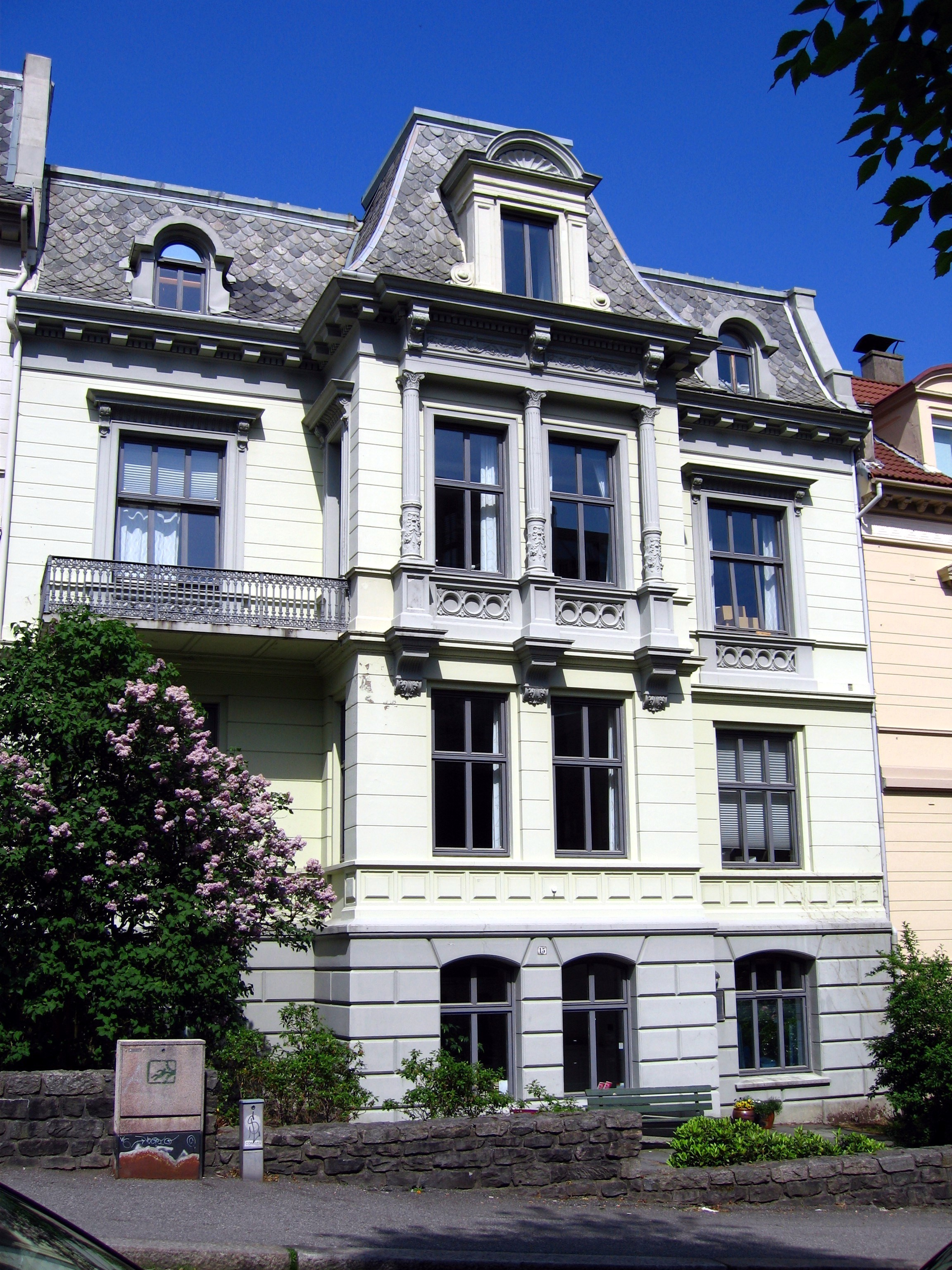
Department of Comparative Politics, University of Bergen

The Department of Comparative Politics is a department at the Faculty of Social Sciences at the University of Bergen that researches and teaches in comparative politics, a subfield of political science.

== Fields of research ==
The department does research and teaches in the topics of political development, democracy and democratisation in a broad sense. However, the empirical approach based on the method of comparison is more defining for the department's activities than the topics (see Wiki-article on comparative politics). Initially, the subject was mainly concentrated on European affairs, but global political developments has caused a widening of interests and focus to themes associated with democracy and democratisation in Asia, Africa and Latin America as well.

== History ==
The Department of Comparative Politics has existed as an individual unit since January 1, 1980. Stein Rokkan, the man regarded as the founder of the department, was appointed as Professor in Comparative Politics at the University of Bergen as early as in 1966. The Comparative Politics subject was initially a part of the Department of Sociology.

Since 1981 the department has arranged the Stein Rokkan Memorial Lecture. This has been in cooperation with the Rokkan Centre since 2002.

== Education ==
The Department of Comparative Politics offers education in political science on bachelor, master and PhD levels. The education in Comparative Politics is known under the label “sampol” (informal) in Norway.
