= Historical sociology =

Interdisciplinary field of research

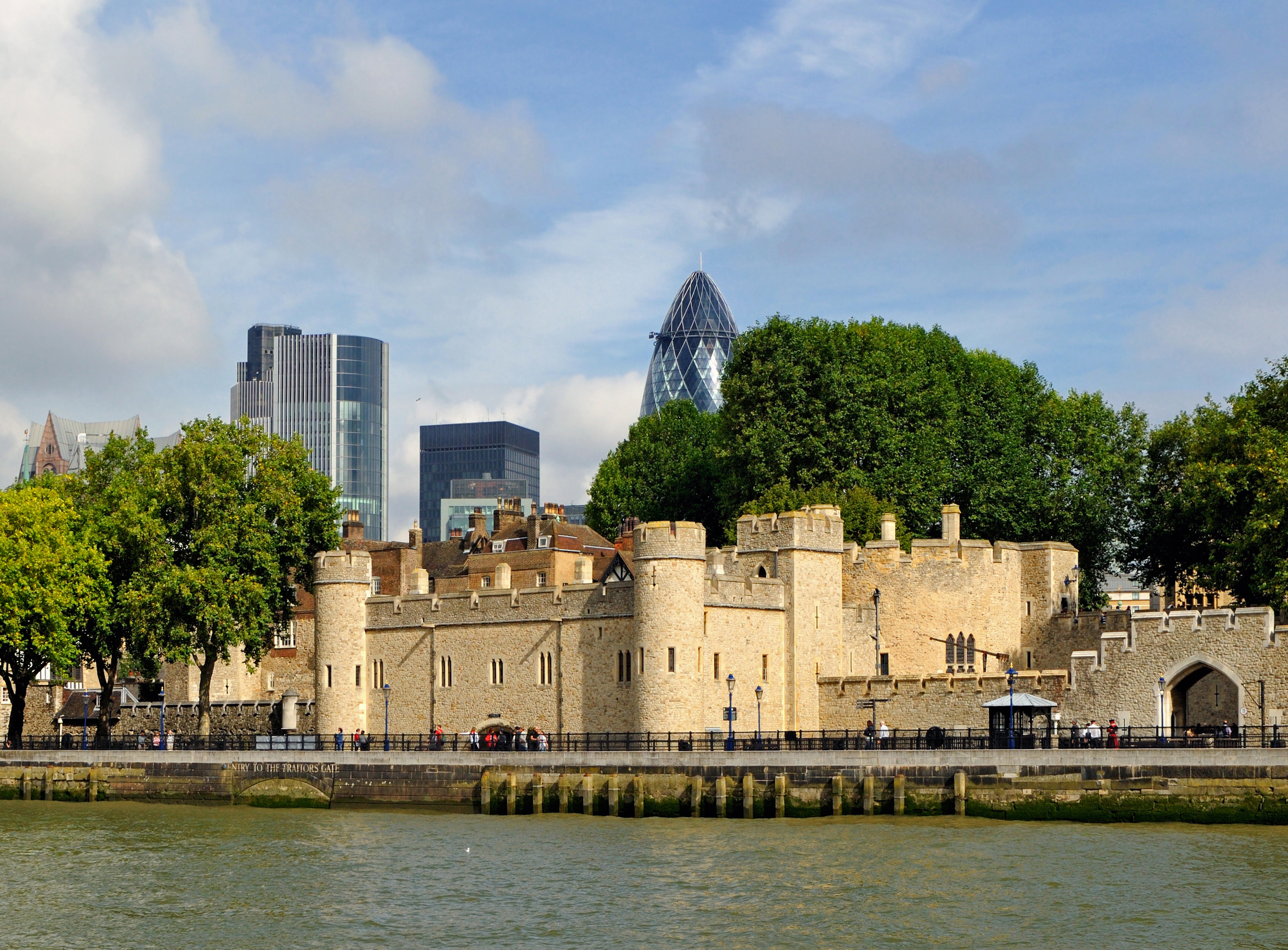
The Traitors' Gate with the Gerkin in the background. Tower of London, London, UK.

Historical sociology is an interdisciplinary field of research that combines sociological and historical methods to understand the past, how societies have developed over time, and the impact this has on the present. It emphasises a mutual line of inquiry of the past and present to understand how discrete historical events fit into wider societal progress and ongoing dilemmas through complementary comparative analysis.

Looking at how social structures are changed and reproduced, historical sociology seeks to understand the visible mechanisms and hidden structures that hinder certain aspects of human development, whilst allowing others to thrive. Throughout this, it challenges the ahistoricism of modern sociology as a discipline, of the limited engagement with the past in studying social structures, whilst simultaneously critiquing the disengagement of historical study with the differences between societies and the broader social patterns between historical events.

This interdisciplinary field operates within a spectrum between history and sociology, with a 'sociology of history' at one end and a 'history of society' at the other. A diverse range of people can be found throughout this spectrum, exploring history through a sociological lens, while others dissect society through its historical events. Although valid lines of research, they are based on singular disciplinary approaches and are reductionist in nature. In the middle of this spectrum, historical sociology can be found, working to intertwine these monodisciplinary efforts into an interdisciplinary approach.

== Origins ==
Over time, history and sociology have developed into two distinct academic disciplines. Historical data is used, and has been used, mainly in these three ways: examining a theory through parallel investigation, applying and contrasting events or policies (such as Verstehen), and considering causality from a macro perspective.

John Stuart Mill's method: a) principle of difference: a case with effect and cause present is contrasted with a case with effect and cause absent; and b) principle of agreement: cases with the same effects are compared in terms of their (ideally identical) causes. There is an important debate about the usefulness of Mill's method for sociological research, given that historical research often relies on only a few cases and that many sociological theories are probabilistic rather than deterministic. Today, historical sociology is measured by a conjunction of questions that are rich in detail.

== Themes ==
=== Human agency ===
A shared theme of sociology and history is accounting for the paradox of human agency. "The problem of agency is the problem of finding a way to account for human experience which recognises simultaneously and in equal measure that history and society are made by constant and more or less purposeful individual action and that individual action, however purposeful, is made by history and society".

This theme is presented across authors from Marx to Spencer, where a symbiotic relation enables action to create structure, whilst that structure defines action. Here, historical sociology outlines that the key to understanding our human agency is to track its development over time. Better enabling us to see the changes and continuations of actions and structures that shape human agency throughout our societies.

== Comparative historical sociology ==
Contemporary historical sociology is primarily concerned with how the state has developed since the Middle Ages, analysing relations among states, classes, and economic and political systems.

== Impact on other disciplines ==
=== International relations ===
Historical sociology has become an increasingly used approach in international relations to draw upon the reflective usefulness of historical sociology in exploring the past and present together, challenging unhistorical viewpoints in the field that stem from realist and neoliberalism paradigms that often see the wider structural makeup of the world as static.

=== Political economy ===
The work of political economy aims to reconcile the development of political and economic systems for insight into policy. Historical sociology critiques political economy for (1) viewing the present as a natural structure, (2) focusing on history as a path-dependent outcome, and (3) shaping their insights around prominent figures with limited engagement of wider processes and "regular" people.

== Notable authors ==
- Giovanni Arrighi
- Jean Baechler
- Randall Collins
- Émile Durkheim
- Norbert Elias
- Michel Foucault
- John A. Hall
- Michael Mann
- Karl Marx
- Barrington Moore
- Karl Polanyi
- Stein Rokkan
- Theda Skocpol
- Charles Tilly
- Immanuel Wallerstein
- Max Weber
- Reinhard Bendix
- Richard Lachmann
- Sinisa Malesevic
- Margaret Somers
- Julia Adams
- George Steinmetz
- Peter Bearman
- Andreas Wimmer

== Research organisations ==
=== Journals ===
Journal of Historical Sociology

=== Historical sociology ===
American Sociological Association Comparative-Historical Sociology

British Sociological Association Historical & Comparative Sociology Study Group

International Sociological Association Historical Sociology Research Committee

=== Interdisciplinary ===
Political and Historical Sociology Research Cluster at Harvard University

== See also ==
- Comparative historical research
- Comparative sociology
- Critical juncture theory
- History of sociology
- International relations theory
- Sociocultural evolution
- World-systems theory
- Economic sociology
- Cliodynamics
- Historical materialism
- Imprinting

== Reading list ==
=== Introductory ===
- Delanty, G., and Isin, E. F. (2003). Handbook of historical sociology. London: SAGE.
