= Path dependence =

Actions in the present are dependent on previous decisions or experiences

In the social sciences, path dependence is the phenomenon of past events or decisions constraining or defining later events or decisions. It can describe outcomes at a single point in time or to the long-run equilibria of a process. Path dependence has been used to describe institutions, technical standards, patterns of economic or social development, organizational behavior, and more.

In common usage, it makes two types of claims. The first is the broad concept that "history matters", often used to challenge explanations that pay insufficient attention to historical factors. This claim can be formulated simply as "the future development of an economic system is affected by the path it has traced out in the past" or "particular events in the past can have crucial effects in the future." The second is a more specific claim about how past events or decisions affect future events or decisions in significant or disproportionate ways, through mechanisms such as increasing returns, positive feedback effects, or other mechanisms.

== Commercial examples ==
=== Videocassette recording systems ===
The videotape format war is a key example of path dependence. Three mechanisms independent of product quality could explain how VHS achieved dominance over Betamax from a negligible early adoption lead:

1. A network effect: videocassette rental stores observed more VHS rentals and stocked up on VHS tapes, leading renters to buy VHS players and rent more VHS tapes, until there was complete vendor lock-in.
2. There was a VCR manufacturer bandwagon effect of switching to VHS-production because they expected it to win the standards battle.
3. Sony did not let as many companies license their Betamax technology for mass production, compared to JVC. It has been speculated that pornography was a factor in securing VHS' dominance, since Sony's stricter licensing meant that nearly all pornographic motion pictures released on video used VHS format. However, others have disputed this point.

An alternative analysis is that VHS was better-adapted to market demands (e.g. having a longer recording time). In this interpretation, path dependence had little to do with VHS's success, which would have occurred even if Betamax had established an early lead.

=== QWERTY keyboard ===
QWERTY keyboard

Dvorak keyboard

Keyboard layouts

The QWERTY keyboard is a prominent example of path dependence due to the widespread emergence and persistence of the QWERTY keyboard. QWERTY has persisted over time despite potentially more efficient keyboard arrangements being developed – QWERTY vs. Dvorak is an example of this. However, as it is not clear whether other keyboard layouts really are better, there is still debate if this is a good example of path dependence.

=== Railway track gauges ===
The standard gauge of railway tracks is another example of path dependence which explains how a seemingly insignificant event or circumstance can change the choice of technology over the long run despite contemporary know-how showing such a choice to be inefficient.

More than half the world's railway gauges are 4 feet 8 1/2 inches (143.5 cm), known as standard gauge, despite the consensus among engineers being that wider gauges have increased performance and speed. The path to the adoption of the standard gauge began in the late 1820s when George Stephenson, a British engineer, began work on the Liverpool and Manchester Railway. His experience with primitive coal tramways resulted in this gauge width being copied by the Liverpool and Manchester Railway, then the rest of Great Britain, and finally by railroads in Europe and North America.

There are tradeoffs involved in the choice of rail gauge between the cost of constructing a line (which rises with wider gauges) and various performance metrics, including maximum speed, low center of gravity (desirable, especially in double-stack rail transport). While the attempts with Brunel gauge, a significantly broader gauge failed, the widespread use of Iberian gauge, Russian gauge and Indian gauge, all of which are broader than Stephenson's choice, show that there is nothing inherent to the 143.5 cm gauge that led to its global success.

== Economics ==
Path dependence theory was originally developed by economists to explain technology adoption processes and industry evolution. The theoretical ideas have had a strong influence on evolutionary economics. A common expression of the concept is the claim that predictable amplifications of small differences are a disproportionate cause of later circumstances, and, in the "strong" form, that this historical hang-over is inefficient.

There are many models and empirical cases where economic processes do not progress steadily toward some pre-determined and unique equilibrium, but rather the nature of any equilibrium achieved depends partly on the process of getting there. Therefore, the outcome of a path-dependent process will often not converge towards a unique equilibrium, but will instead reach one of several equilibria (sometimes known as absorbing states).

This dynamic vision of economic evolution is very different from the tradition of neo-classical economics, which in its simplest form assumed that only a single outcome could possibly be reached, regardless of initial conditions or transitory events. With path dependence, both the starting point and 'accidental' events (noise) can have significant effects on the ultimate outcome. In each of the following examples it is possible to identify some random events that disrupted the ongoing course, with irreversible consequences.

=== Economic development ===
In economic development, it is said (initially by Paul David in 1985) that a standard that is first-to-market can become entrenched (like the QWERTY layout in typewriters still used in computer keyboards). He called this "path dependence", and said that inferior standards can persist simply because of the legacy they have built up. That QWERTY vs. Dvorak is an example of this phenomenon, has been re-asserted, questioned, and continues to be argued. Economic debate continues on the significance of path dependence in determining how standards form.

Economists from Alfred Marshall to Paul Krugman have noted that similar businesses tend to congregate geographically ("agglomerate"); opening near similar companies attracts workers with skills in that business, which draws in more businesses seeking experienced employees. There may have been no reason to prefer one place to another before the industry developed, but as it concentrates geographically, participants elsewhere are at a disadvantage, and will tend to move into the hub, further increasing its relative efficiency. This network effect follows a statistical power law in the idealized case, though negative feedback can occur (through rising local costs). Buyers often cluster around sellers, and related businesses frequently form business clusters, so a concentration of producers (initially formed by accident and agglomeration) can trigger the emergence of many dependent businesses in the same region.

In the 1980s, the US dollar exchange rate appreciated, lowering the world price of tradable goods below the cost of production in many (previously successful) U.S. manufacturers. Some of the factories that closed as a result, could later have been operated at a (cash-flow) profit after dollar depreciation, but reopening would have been too expensive. This is an example of hysteresis, switching barriers, and irreversibility.

If the economy follows adaptive expectations, future inflation is partly determined by past experience with inflation, since experience determines expected inflation and this is a major determinant of realized inflation.

A transitory high rate of unemployment during a recession can lead to a permanently higher unemployment rate because of the skills loss (or skill obsolescence) by the unemployed, along with a deterioration of work attitudes. In other words, cyclical unemployment may generate structural unemployment. This structural hysteresis model of the labour market differs from the prediction of a "natural" unemployment rate or NAIRU, around which 'cyclical' unemployment is said to move without influencing the "natural" rate itself.

=== Types of path dependence ===
Liebowitz and Margolis distinguish types of path dependence; some do not imply inefficiencies and do not challenge the policy implications of neoclassical economics. Only "third-degree" path dependence—where switching gains are high, but transition is impractical—involves such a challenge. They argue that such situations should be rare for theoretical reasons, and that no real-world cases of private locked-in inefficiencies exist. Vergne and Durand qualify this critique by specifying the conditions under which path dependence theory can be tested empirically.

Technically, a path-dependent stochastic process has an asymptotic distribution that "evolves as a consequence (function of) the process's own history". This is also known as a non-ergodic stochastic process.

In The Theory of the Growth of the Firm (1959), Edith Penrose analyzed how the growth of a firm both organically and through acquisition is strongly influenced by the experience of its managers and the history of the firm's development.

=== Conditions which give rise to path dependence ===
Path dependence may arise or be hindered by a number of important factors, these may include

- Durability of capital equipment
- Technical interrelatedness
- Increasing returns
- Dynamic increasing returns to adoption

== Social sciences ==
=== Institutions ===
Recent methodological work in comparative politics and sociology has adapted the concept of path dependence into analyses of political and social phenomena. Path dependence has primarily been used in comparative-historical analyses of the development and persistence of institutions, whether they be social, political, or cultural. There are arguably two types of path-dependent processes:

- One is the critical juncture framework, most notably utilized by Ruth and David Collier in political science. In the critical juncture, antecedent conditions allow contingent choices that set a specific trajectory of institutional development and consolidation that is difficult to reverse. As in economics, the generic drivers are: lock-in, positive feedback, increasing returns (the more a choice is made, the bigger its benefits), and self-reinforcement (which creates forces sustaining the decision).
- The other path-dependent process deals with reactive sequences where a primary event sets off a temporally-linked and causally-tight deterministic chain of events that is nearly uninterruptible. These reactive sequences have been used to link such things as the assassination of Martin Luther King Jr. with welfare expansion, or the Industrial Revolution in England with the development of the steam engine.

The critical juncture framework has been used to explain the development and persistence of welfare states, labor incorporation in Latin America, and the variations in economic development between countries, among other things. Scholars such as Kathleen Thelen caution that the historical determinism in path-dependent frameworks is subject to constant disruption from institutional evolution.

Kathleen Thelen has criticized the application of QWERTY keyboard-style mechanisms to politics. She argues that such applications to politics are both too contingent and too deterministic. Too contingent in the sense that the initial choice is open and flukey, and too deterministic in the sense that once the initial choice is made, an unavoidable path inevitably forms from which there is no return.

Based on the theory of path dependence, Monika Stachowiak-Kudła and Janusz Kudła show that legal tradition affects the administrative court's rulings in Poland. It also complements the two other reasons for diversified verdicts: the experience of the judges and courts (specialization) and preference (bias) for one of the parties. This effect is persistent even if the verdicts are controversial and result in serious consequences for a party and when the penalty paid by the complainant is perceived as excessive but fulfilling the strict rules of law. The German tradition of law favours legal certainty, while the courts from the former Russian and Austrian partitions are more likely to refer to the principle of justice. Interestingly, the institutional factors can be identified almost one hundred years after the end of the partition period and the unification of formal and material law, corroborating the existence of path dependence.

=== Organizations ===
Paul Pierson's influential attempt to rigorously formalize path dependence within political science, draws partly on ideas from economics. Herman Schwartz has questioned those efforts, arguing that forces analogous to those identified in the economic literature are not pervasive in the political realm, where the strategic exercise of power gives rise to, and transforms, institutions.

Especially sociology and organizational theory, a distinct yet closely related concept to path dependence is the concept of imprinting which captures how initial environmental conditions leave a persistent mark (or imprint) on organizations and organizational collectives (such as industries and communities), thus continuing to shape organizational behaviours and outcomes in the long run, even as external environmental conditions change.

=== Individuals and groups ===
The path dependence of emergent strategy has been observed in behavioral experiments with individuals and groups.

== Other examples ==
- A general type of path dependence is a typological vestige.
  - In typography, for example, some customs persist, although the reason for their existence no longer applies; for example, the placement of the period inside a quotation in U.S. spelling. In metal type, pieces of terminal punctuation, such as the comma and period, are comparatively small and delicate (as they must be x-height for proper kerning.) Placing the full-height quotation mark on the outside protected the smaller cast metal sort from damage if the word needed to be moved around within or between lines. This would be done even if the period did not belong to the text being quoted.
- Evolution is considered by some to be path-dependent and historically contingent: mutations occurring in the past have had long-term effects on current life forms, some of which may no longer be adaptive to current conditions. For instance, there is a controversy about whether the panda's thumb is a leftover trait or not.
- In the computer and software markets, legacy systems indicate path dependence: customers' needs in the present market often include the ability to read data or run programs from past generations of products. Thus, for instance, a customer may need not merely the best available word processor, but rather the best available word processor that can read Microsoft Word files. Such limitations in compatibility contribute to lock-in, and more subtly, to design compromises for independently developed products, if they attempt to be compatible. Also see embrace, extend and extinguish.
- In socioeconomic systems, commercial fisheries' harvest rates and conservation consequences are found to be path dependent as predicted by the interaction between slow institutional adaptation, fast ecological dynamics, and diminishing returns.
- In physics and mathematics, a non-holonomic system is a physical system in which the states depend on the physical paths taken.

== See also ==
- Critical juncture theory
- Imprinting (organizational theory)
- Innovation butterfly
- Historicism
- Network effect
- Opportunity cost
- Ratchet effect
- Technological determinism
- Tyranny of small decisions
- Vendor lock-in, which is closely connected to path dependence
