= Comparative historical research =

Method in the social sciences

Comparative historical research is a method of social science that examines historical events in order to create explanations that are valid beyond a particular time and place, either by direct comparison to other historical events, theory building, or reference to the present day. Generally, it involves comparisons of social processes across times and places. It overlaps with historical sociology. While the disciplines of history and sociology have always been connected, they have connected in different ways at different times. This form of research may use any of several theoretical orientations. It is distinguished by the types of questions it asks, not the theoretical framework it employs.

== Major researchers ==
Some commentators have identified three waves of historical comparative research. The first wave of historical comparative research concerned how societies came to be modern, i.e. based on individual and rational action, with exact definitions varying widely. Some of the major researchers in this mode were Alexis de Tocqueville, Karl Marx, Emile Durkheim, Max Weber, and W.E.B. Du Bois. The second wave reacted to a perceived ahistorical body of theory and sought to show how social systems were not static, but developed over time. Notable authors of this wave include Reinhard Bendix, Barrington Moore, Jr., Stein Rokkan, Theda Skocpol, Charles Tilly, Michael Mann, and Mark Gould. Some have placed the Annales school and Pierre Bourdieu in this general group, despite their stylistic differences. The current wave of historical comparative research sociology is often but not exclusively post-structural in its theoretical orientation. Influential current authors include Julia Adams, Ann Laura Stoler, Philip Gorski, and James Mahoney.

Moore's Social Origins of Dictatorship and Democracy influenced Daron Acemoglu and James A. Robinson to apply comparative methods to economic history in a 2006 book called Economic Origins of Dictatorship and Democracy. In 2024, Acemoglu, Robinson, and Simon Johnson won the Nobel Memorial Prize in Economic Sciences for their work.

== Methods ==
There are four major methods that researchers use to collect historical data. These are archival data, secondary sources, running records, and recollections. The archival data, or primary sources, are typically the resources that researchers rely most heavily on. Archival data includes official documents and other items that would be found in archives, museums, etc. Secondary sources are the works of other historians who have written history. Running records are ongoing series of statistical or other sorts of data, such as census data, ship's registries, property deeds, etc. Finally recollections include sources such as autobiographies, memoirs or diaries.

There are four stages, as discussed by Schutt, to systematic qualitative comparative historical studies: (1) develop the premise of the investigation, identifying events, concepts, etc., that may explain the phenomena; (2) choose the case(s) (location- nation, region) to examine; (3) use what Theda Skocpol has termed as "interpretive historical sociology" and examine the similarities and the differences; and (4) based on the information gathered, propose a causal explanation for the phenomena.

The key issues in methods for historical comparative research stem from the incomplete nature of historical data, the complexity and scale of the social systems, and the nature of the questions asked. Historical data is a difficult set of data to work with due to multiple factors. This data set can be very biased, such as diaries, memoirs, letters, which are all influenced not only by the person writing them, that person's world view but can also, logically, be linked to that individual's socioeconomic status. In this way the data can be corrupt/skewed. Historical data regardless or whether it may or may not be biased (diaries vs. official documents) is also vulnerable to time. Time can destroy fragile paper, fade ink until it is illegible, wars, environmental disasters can all destroy data and special interest groups can destroy mass amounts of data to serve a specific purpose at the time they lived, etc. Hence, data is naturally incomplete and can lead social scientists to many barriers in their research. Often historical comparative research is a broad and wide reaching topic such as how democracy evolved in three specific regions. Tracking how democracy developed is a daunting task for one country or region let alone three. Here the scale of the social system, which is attempting to be studied, is overwhelming but also the complexity is extreme. Within each case there are multiple different social systems that can affect the development of a society and its political system. The factors must be separated and analyzed so that causality can be attained. It is causality that brings us to yet another key issue in methods for historical comparative research, the nature of the questions which are asked is attempting to propose causal relationships between a set of variables. Determining causality alone is a difficult task; coupled with the incomplete nature of historical data and the complexity and scale of the social systems being used to examine causality the task becomes even more challenging.

Theda Skocpol and Margaret Somers argued that there were three types of comparative history research:

- 1. comparative history as macro-causal analysis - the emphasis is on identifying both relevant differences and similarities across cases in an attempt to test hypotheses or build theory
- 2. comparative history as parallel demonstration of theory – the emphasis is on identifying similarities across relevant cases
- 3. comparative history as contrast of contexts – the emphasis is on the differences between cases and the uniqueness of each case. Scholars that use this approach tends to be wary of drawing broad generalizations.

A lot of comparative historical research uses inductive iteration (as opposed to purely deductive methods) whereby scholars assess the data first and reformulate internally valid explanations to account for the data.

== Identifying features ==
The three identifying issues of historical comparative research are causal relationships, processes over time, and comparisons. As mentioned above causal relationships are difficult to support although we make causal assumptions daily. Schutt discusses the five criteria, which must be met in order to have a causal relationship. Of the five the first three are the most important: association, time order and nonspuriousness. Association simply means that between two variables; the change in one variable is related to the change in another variable. Time order refers to the fact that the cause (the independent variable) must be shown to have occurred first and the effect (the dependent variable) to have occurred second. Nonspuriousness says that the association between two variables is not because of a third variable. The final two criteria are; identifying a causal mechanism- how the connection/association among variables is thought to have occurred- and the context in which this association occurs. The deterministic causal approach requires that in every study, the independent and dependent variable have an association, and within that study every case (nation, region) the independent variable has an effect on the dependent variable.

John Stuart Mill devised five methods for systematically analyzing observations and making more accurate assumptions about causality. Mill's Methods discusses; direct method of agreement, method of difference, joint method of agreement and difference, method of residues and method of concomitant variations. Mill's methods are typically the most useful when the causal relationship is already suspected and can therefore be a tool for eliminating other explanations. Some methodologists contend Mill's methods cannot provide proof that the variation in one variable was caused by the variation of another variable.

The comparative-historical method can be seen in The Familial State: Ruling Families and Merchant Capitalism in Early Modern Europe. Researcher Julia Adams draws on both original archival work and secondary sources to analyze how merchant families contested with noble families for influence in the early modern Dutch Republic. She argues that those contests produced the political institutions that became the modern Dutch state, by frequently making reference to England and France. Her use of feminist theory to account for elements of the Dutch Republic, such as patriarchal kinship structures in the ruling families, expanded on earlier theories of how modern states came to be. This is an illustration of how comparative-historical analysis uses cases and theories together.

== Difficulties ==
There are several difficulties that historical comparative research faces. James Mahoney, one of the current leading figures in historical comparative research, identifies several of these in his book "Comparative Historical Analysis in the Social Sciences." Mahoney highlights key issues such as how micro level studies can be incorporated into the macro level field of historical comparative research, issues ripe for historical comparative research that continue to remain overlooked, such as law, and the issue of whether historical comparative research should be approached as a science or approached as a history. This is one of the more prevalent debates today, often debated between Theda Skocpol, who sides with the historical approach, and Kiser and Hechter, who are proponents of the scientific view that should search for general causal principles. Both Kiser and Hechter employ models within Rational Choice Theory for their general causal principles. Historical researchers that oppose them (Skocpol, Summers, others) argue that Kiser and Hechter do not suggest many other plausible general theories, and thus it seems as though their advocacy for general theories is actually advocacy for their preferred general theory. They also raise other criticisms of using rational choice theory in historical comparative research.

== See also ==
- Reinhard Bendix
- Comparative sociology
- Critical juncture theory
