= Wedge issue =

Divisive political or social issue

A wedge issue in politics is any issue used to create a division within a political party. These issues are usually employed as a tactic by a minority party against a governing majority party, with the aim of splitting the majority's electorate into two or more camps. Although any issue could potentially be used as a wedge, some of the most common examples are often concerned with social justice, such as abortion or civil rights. Due to the prevalence of social justice issues as a wedge, the tactic is often most effectively employed by conservative parties against liberal parties. American political strategist Lee Atwater has been noted as an early champion of wedge issue politics during the Reagan era.

== Examples ==
=== Australia ===
During the 2001 federal election campaign in Australia, there was a controversy regarding Afghan asylum seekers arriving on unauthorized vessels, there having been several widely publicized landings of hundreds of people. On August 24, 2001, a ship bearing 460 such people became distressed, and its passengers were picked up by the Norwegian cargo vessel MV Tampa.

The governing Liberal Party of Australia under Prime Minister John Howard took the opportunity to appear tough on asylum seekers. The opposition Australian Labor Party (ALP) had a slight majority of people strongly favoring more sympathetic treatment and was perceived as internally split. This provoked a debate within the ALP on the merits of siding with national opinion (in favor of the Government's actions) or opposing. With over 90% of some television polls supporting the government's stance, the leader of the ALP Kim Beazley chose to go against the majority and agree to the former policy—though it ended up opposing certain elements of proposed legislation, which the Liberal Party framed as weak on border security.

The Liberal Party campaigned largely on a platform of border security and increased its support at the federal election that November despite being the incumbent. Some who would typically vote Labor voted instead for the Greens and the Democrats in protest against what they saw as the ALP's complicity.

It was later claimed that the controversial campaign strategists Lynton Crosby and Mark Textor had an active role in making the Tampa incident a wedge issue for Howard to exploit.

=== United States ===
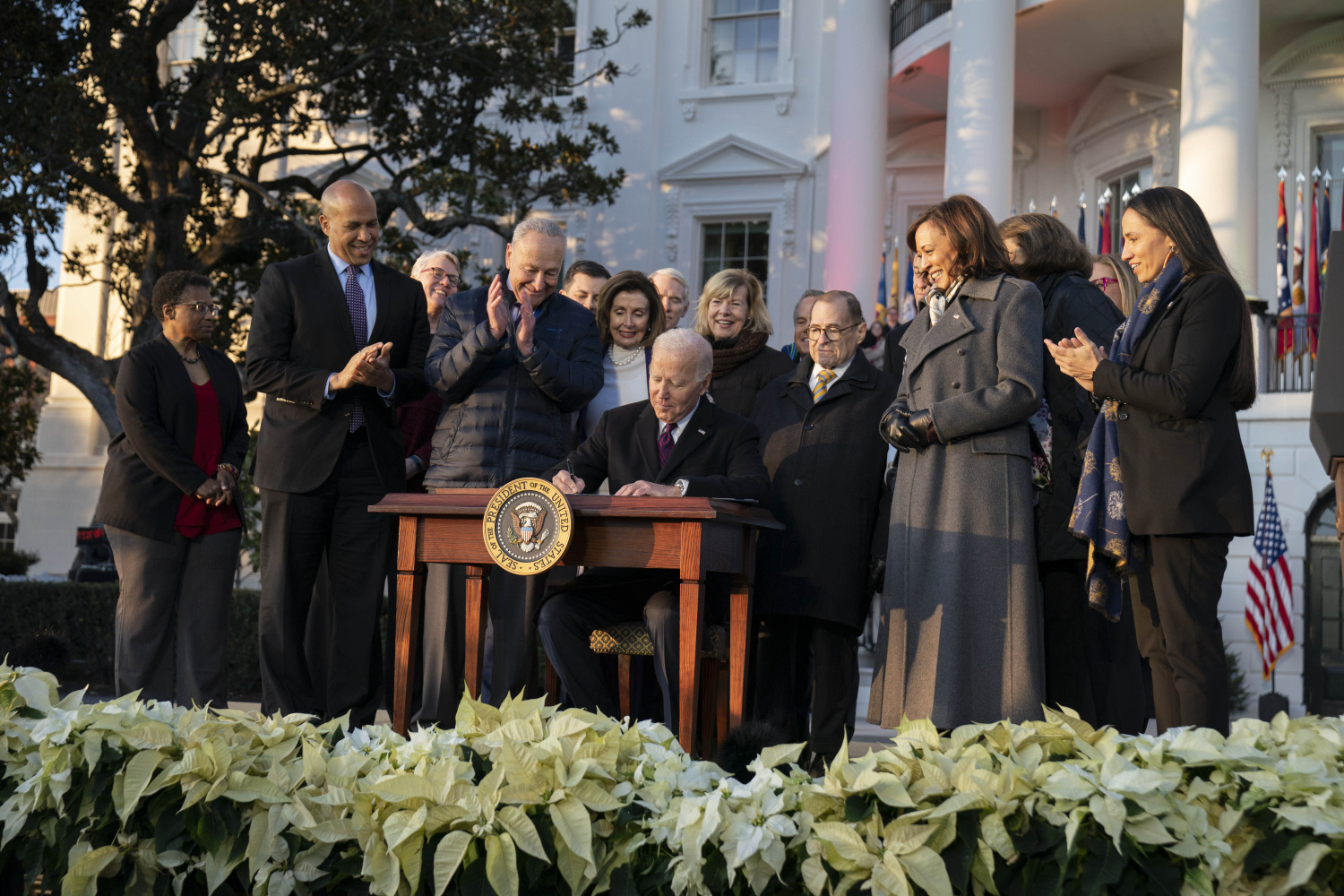
Joe Biden, who previously voted in favor of the Defense of Marriage Act on September 10, 1996, signing the Respect for Marriage Act into law on December 13, 2022

During the Civil Rights era, Republicans attempted to drive a wedge between Democrats on the issue of race. In the 1968 US presidential election, northern Democratic support of the Civil Rights Act caused a cleavage with southern Democrats which led to Democratic Alabama Governor George Wallace mounting a third party campaign.

Gay marriage was considered a wedge issue in 1990s Democratic politics, with President Bill Clinton signing into law the Defense of Marriage Act (DOMA) in 1996 amidst pressure from Centrist Democrats, but its efficacy was lost in later years as support for gay marriage in the electorate grew. President Joe Biden is another example of a Democrat who voted in favor of DOMA, but signed the bill's antithesis, the Respect for Marriage Act, into law over 20 years later.

Reform of the laws regarding illegal immigration to the United States operated as a wedge issue in 2007. Some Republican legislators, with the backing of President George W. Bush, sought to address the dual issues of ongoing illegal immigration to the United States and the illegal status of an estimated 12 million people currently living in America. Other Republicans opposed amnesty for illegal immigrants, out of fear that their constituents were unsupportive of immigration reform. Some Democrats pitched in to keep the issue alive as they recognized the issue was dividing the Republican party between advocates of reform and advocates of the status quo. The result was a division in Republican ranks and a stalled bill in Congress. After the election of Donald Trump in 2016, the views of American voters shifted to align more closely with their parties along partisan lines, reducing immigration policy's status as a wedge issue.

COVID-19 served as wedge issue for both political parties in the 2020 US presidential election, with both the Democratic and Republican electorate divided over whether candidates Joe Biden or Donald Trump could effectively handle the pandemic. Biden sought to divide the Republican base by claiming Trump had mismanaged the response to the COVID-19 crisis, while Trump contended that Biden, if elected, would shut down the economy.

During the 2024 election cycle, Republicans sought to drive a wedge between Democratic voters by portraying Democrats as taking a radical stance by aligning themselves with the transgender rights movement. In that same election, the Gaza war became a wedge issue among Democrats who increasingly opposed sending military aid to Israel.

=== United Kingdom ===
Both Labour (PLP) and Conservative Members of Parliament struggled to handle internal divisions within their party in the beginning stages of Brexit policy decisions. The split caused the emergence of two different sub-groups: pro-Remain (or pro-EU) and pro-Leave (Eurosceptics). The divide was heightened in the face of leadership changes. While 90% of Labour members were pro-remain, the Leader of the PLP, Jeremy Corbyn, attempted to sideline the issue in several interviews, which provoked a vote of no confidence. A similar situation occurred within the Conservative Party, when Theresa May, who had supported Remain during the Referendum, was elected as Prime Minister despite her party's majority leaning towards pro-Leave. In an attempt to unify the party, May led with a "Brexit means Brexit" mantra, switching positions and attempting to appease both divisions by finding compromise in her proposed legislation. However, her policies only further polarized the two factions and weakened the party, which resulted in her resignation after a devastating loss of seats.

=== New Zealand ===
In the 2005 New Zealand general election, the National Party sought to capitalize on the foreshore and seabed issue by employing wedge tactics to drive racial divisions between Māori and Non-Māori. The strategy was prominently highlighted by in a speech by party leader Don Brash at the Orewa Rotary Club, where he called for "One Law for All" and the removal of Māori parliamentary seats, and resulted in a rise of 17-points for the National Party. In an attempt to compete with the party's growing popularity, the Labour Party proposed the Foreshore and Seabed Legislation, which declared the properties to be in the legal possession of the Crown, but offered an avenue for the Māori to apply for customary reservation. Infighting ensued between the Māori members of the Labour Party when three of them refused to vote in support of the bill. One MP in particular, Tariana Turia, resigned from her position to form the Māori Party, eventually winning back her seat in Parliament- and four more for the new party in the general election, won from Labour.

== See also ==
- Attack ad
- Cleavage (politics)
- Cross-cutting cleavage
- Divide and rule
- Dog-whistle politics
- Negative campaigning
- Propaganda
- Push poll
- Salami tactics
- Third rail (politics)
- Valence issue
- Issue Voting
