= Imprinting (organizational theory) =

In organizational theory and organizational behavior, imprinting is a core concept describing how the past affects the present. Imprinting is generally defined as a process whereby, during a brief period of susceptibility, a focal entity or actor (such as an industry, organization, or an individual) develops characteristics that reflect prominent features of the environment, and these characteristics continue to persist despite significant environmental changes in subsequent periods. This definition emphasizes three key elements of imprinting:

1. brief sensitive periods of transition during which the focal entity exhibits high susceptibility to external influences;
2. a process whereby the focal entity comes to reflect elements of its environment during a sensitive period; and
3. the persistence of imprints despite subsequent environmental changes.

== Organizational research on imprinting ==
The use of the imprinting concept (although not the term itself) in organizational theory dates back to Arthur Stinchcombe’s 1965 paper entitled "Social Structure and Organizations." This essay focused on understanding why organizations and industries that were founded in the same period were so similar even today. According to this essay, external environmental forces powerfully shaped firms’ initial structures during the founding period, and these structures persisted in the long run, well beyond the time of founding. For example, as most university fraternities emerged in three different waves, their current organizational features still reflect the imprint of one of these three periods. The first wave of foundings reflected the secularization of Northern liberal arts colleges in the 1840s; the second wave began in the South in the latter half of the 1860s; and the third wave came between 1900 and 1920, when marginalized populations of Black, Catholic, and Jewish students established fraternities emphasizing anti-discrimination goals. In subsequent periods, each of these three different types carried the legacy of their founding environment. Even though Stinchcombe did not specifically use the term "imprinting," the term soon became associated with his essay.

Stinchcombe’s primary focus was at the industry level, but most subsequent studies have examined how individual organizations bear a lasting imprint of founding conditions. For instance, in a series of studies on Silicon Valley high-tech start-ups, scholars have measured founders’ mental models and initial decisions and then tracked how these founding conditions influenced subsequent organizational trajectories. The results suggest that the organizational patterns set by a founder have persistent effects on a wide array of outcomes even after the founder leaves the firm.

== Imprinting at other levels of analysis ==
Even though the organization has been the dominant level of analysis in much of the literature building on the imprinting concept, recent years have also seen the emergence of imprinting research at the other levels analysis as well. For example, scholars have used the concept of imprinting to examine how and why organizational building blocks—such as jobs and routines—continue to reflect the circumstances of their creation. At the individual level, researchers have explored how early career experiences exert a lasting effect on people’s careers or job titles (a process known as career imprinting or position imprints, respectively). For example, experiences in a particular type of (munificent or scarce) resource environment early in one's career or organizational tenure might influence subsequent work styles and job performance. In this line of research, the concept of imprint-environment fit highlights that the same imprint may be beneficial for performance in some environments and detrimental in others.

== See also ==
- Path dependence
- Imprinting (psychology)
