= Political Man =

1960 book by Seymour Martin Lipset

- Author: Seymour Martin Lipset
- Language: English
- Subject: Political science
- Publisher: Doubleday & Company
- Publication date: 1960
- Publication place: United States
- Media type: Hardback/paperback
- Pages: 477
- ISBN: 0-8018-2522-9
- Dewey Decimal: 306/.2 19
- LC Class: JC423 .L58 1981

Political Man: The Social Bases of Politics is a political science book from 1960 by Seymour Martin Lipset.

The book is an influential analysis of the bases of democracy across the world. One of the important sections is Chapter 2: "Economic Development and Democracy." Larry Diamond and Gary Marks argue that "Lipset's assertion of a direct relationship between economic development and democracy has been subjected to extensive empirical examination, both quantitative and qualitative, in the past 30 years. And the evidence shows, with striking clarity and consistency, a strong causal relationship between economic development and democracy." In Chapter V, Lipset analyzed "Fascism"—Left, Right, and Center, and explained that the study of the social bases of different modern mass movements suggests that each major social stratum has both democratic and extremist political expressions. He explained the mistakes of identifying extremism as a right wing phenomenon, and Communism with the left wing phenomenon. He underlined that extremist ideologies and groups can be classified and analyzed in the same terms as democratic groups, i.e., right, left, and center.

The book sold more than 400,000 copies and was translated into 20 languages, including Vietnamese, Bengali, and Serbo-Croatian.

== Contents ==
- Contents
  - Chapter I: The Sociology of Politics
- PART I: The Conditions of the Democratic Order
  - Chapter II: Economic Development and Democracy
  - Chapter III: Social Conflict, Legitimacy, and Democracy
  - Chapter IV: Working-class Authoritarianism
  - Chapter V: Fascism—Left, Right, and Center
- PART II: Voting in Western Democracies
  - Chapter VI: Elections: Who Votes and Who Doesn't?
  - Chapter VII: Elections: The Expression of the Democratic Class Struggle
  - Chapter VIII: Elections: The Expression of the Democratic Class Struggle—Continuity and Change
- PART III: Political Behavior in American Society
  - Chapter IX: Classes and Parties in American Politics
  - Chapter X: American Intellectuals: Their Politics and Status
  - Chapter XI: The Emergence of the One-party South—The Election of 1860
- PART IV: The Politics of Private Government: A Case Study
  - Chapter XII: The Political Process in Trade-unions
- A Personal Postscript
