= Seymour Martin Lipset =

American sociologist (1922–2006)

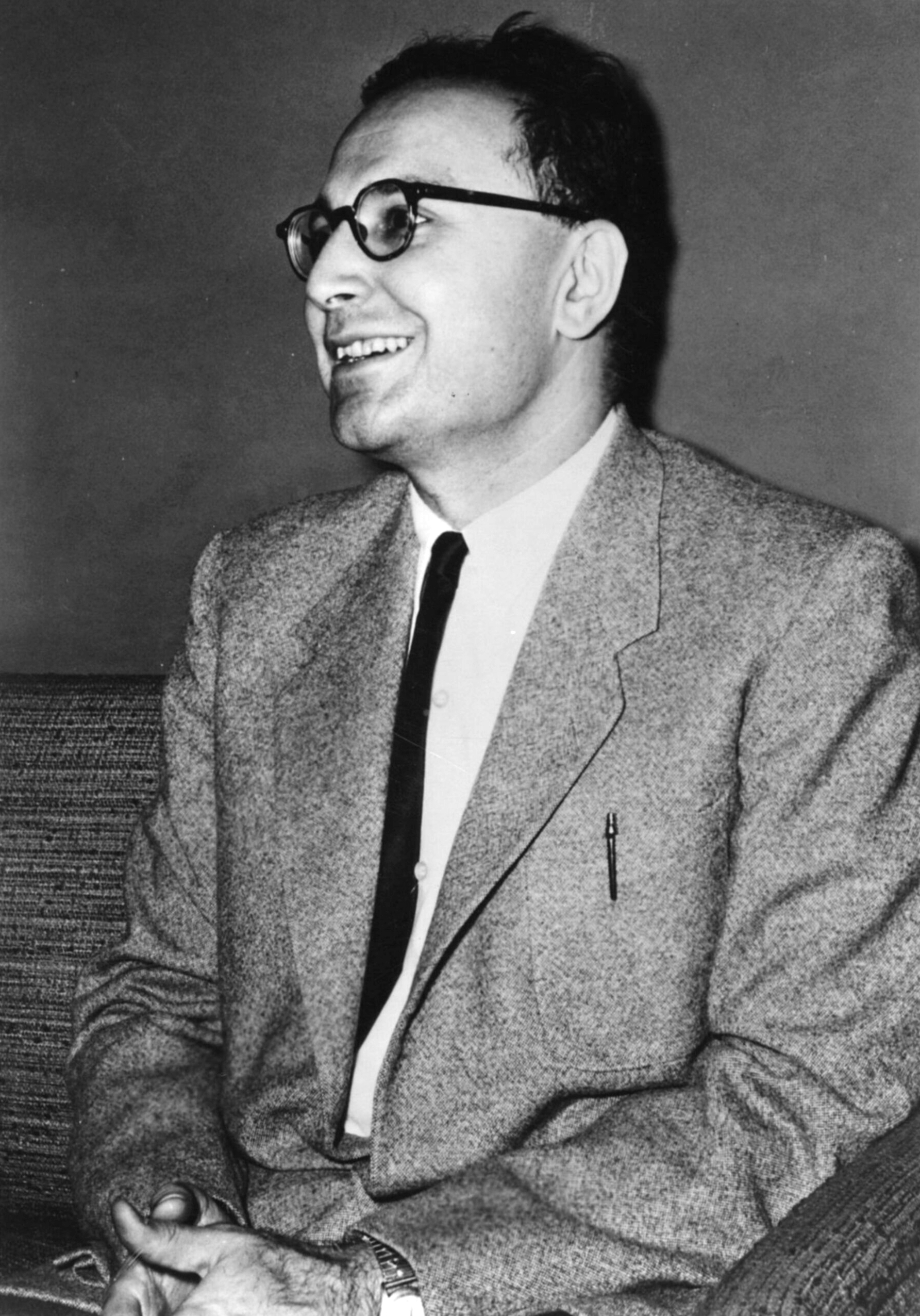
- Lipset in 1964
- Born: March 18, 1922; New York City, US
- Died: December 31, 2006 (aged 84); Arlington, Virginia, US

Academic background
- Education: City College of New York; Columbia University
- Thesis: Agrarian Socialism (1949)

Academic work
- Discipline: Political science; sociology
- Sub-discipline: Political behaviour; political sociology
- School or tradition: Behaviourism
- Institutions: Stanford University; Harvard University
- Main interests: Modernization theory; cleavage theory
- Notable works: "Some Social Requisites of Democracy" (1959); Political Man (1960); Party Systems and Voter Alignments (1967)

Seymour Martin Lipset (/ˈlɪpsɪt/ LIP-sit; March 18, 1922 – December 31, 2006) was an American sociologist and political scientist. His major work was in the fields of political sociology, trade union organization, social stratification, public opinion, and the sociology of intellectual life. He also wrote extensively about the conditions for democracy in comparative perspective. He was president of both the American Political Science Association (1979–1980) and the American Sociological Association (1992–1993). A socialist in his early life, Lipset later moved to the right, and was considered to be one of the first neoconservatives.

At his death in 2006, The Guardian called him "the leading theorist of democracy and American exceptionalism"; The New York Times labeled him "a pre-eminent sociologist, political scientist and incisive theorist of American uniqueness" and The Washington Post reported that he was "one of the most influential social scientists of the past half century."

== Early life and education ==
Lipset was born in Harlem, New York City, the son of Russian Jewish immigrants. He grew up in the Bronx among Irish, Italian and Jewish youth. "I was in that atmosphere where there was a lot of political talk," Lipset recalled, "but you never heard of Democrats or Republicans; the question was communists, socialists, Trotskyists, or anarchists. It was all sorts of different left wing groups." From an early age, Seymour was active in the Young People's Socialist League, "an organization of young Trotskyists that he would later head." He graduated from City College of New York, where he was an anti-Stalinist leftist. He received a PhD in sociology from Columbia University in 1949. Before that he taught at the University of Toronto.

== Career ==
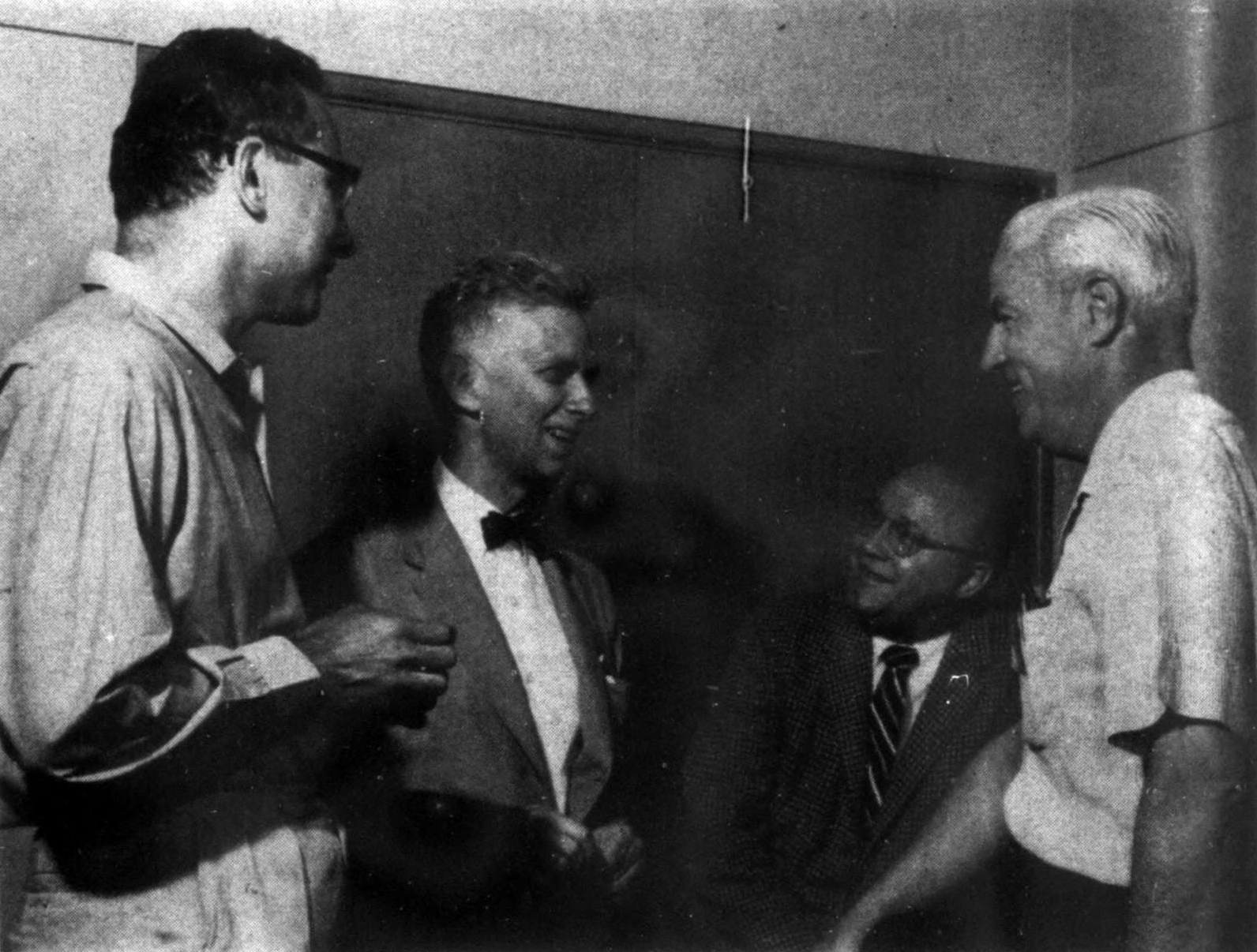
Lipset (far left) in a group discussion with August Heckscher II (second from left), Kenneth Haagensen (second from right), and Kenneth Youel (far right) c. 1960

Lipset was the Caroline S.G. Munro Professor of Political Science and Sociology at Stanford University and a senior fellow at the Hoover Institution and then became the George D. Markham Professor of Government and Sociology at Harvard University. He also taught at Columbia University, the University of California, Berkeley, the University of Toronto, and George Mason University, where he was the Hazel Professor of Public Policy.

Lipset was a member of the American Academy of Arts and Sciences, the National Academy of Sciences, and the American Philosophical Society. He was the only person to have been President of both the American Political Science Association (1979–1980) and the American Sociological Association (1992–1993). He also served as the President of the International Society of Political Psychology, the Sociological Research Association, the World Association for Public Opinion Research, the Society for Comparative Research, and the Paul F. Lazarsfeld Society in Vienna.

Lipset received the MacIver Prize for Political Man (1960) and, in 1970, the Gunnar Myrdal Prize for The Politics of Unreason.

In 2001, Lipset was named among the top 100 American intellectuals, as measured by academic citations, in Richard Posner's book, Public Intellectuals: A Study of Decline.

=== Academic research ===
==== "Some Social Requisites of Democracy" ====
One of Lipset's most cited works is "Some Social Requisites of Democracy: Economic Development and Political Legitimacy" (1959), a key work on modernization theory, on democratization, and an article that includes the Lipset hypothesis that economic development leads to democracy.

Lipset was one of the first proponents of the theory of modernization", which states that democracy is the direct result of economic growth, and that "[t]he more well-to-do a nation, the greater the chances that it will sustain democracy." Lipset's modernization theory has continued to be a significant factor in academic discussions and research relating to democratic transitions. It has been referred to as the "Lipset hypothesis" and the "Lipset thesis".

The Lipset hypothesis has been challenged by Guillermo O'Donnell, Adam Przeworski and Daron Acemoglu and James A. Robinson.

One of the debates as to how exactly democracy emerges, is between endogenous or exogenous democratization. Endogenous democratization holds the argument that democratization happens as a result of the country's previous history leading up to that point. So here economic development and expansion of the middle class play a crucial role. Proponents of this viewpoint are Carles Boix and Susan Stokes. Exogenous democratization, on the other hand, argues that democratization happens as a result of external factors, such as the zeitgeist of pro-democracy political movements seen across the world from the third wave of democratization up until the 1990s. According to Adam Przeworski and Fernando Limongi, the reason for the correlation between economic wealth and democracy is for the simple reason that once a country has transitioned to a democratic rule, it has a much better chance of staying democratic if it is wealthy, where as poor countries most often fall back into autocratic rule.

==== Political Man ====
Political Man: The Social Bases of Politics, published in 1960, is an influential analysis of the bases of democracy, fascism, communism ("working class authoritarianism"), and other political organizations, across the world, in the interwar period and after World War II. One of the important sections is Chapter 2: "Economic Development and Democracy." Larry Diamond and Gary Marks argue that "Lipset's assertion of a direct relationship between economic development and democracy has been subjected to extensive empirical examination, both quantitative and qualitative, in the past 30 years. And the evidence shows, with striking clarity and consistency, a strong causal relationship between economic development and democracy." In Chapter V, Lipset analyzed "Fascism"—Left, Right, and Center, and explained that the study of the social bases of different modern mass movements suggests that each major social stratum has both democratic and extremist political expressions. He explained the mistakes of identifying extremism as a right-wing phenomenon, and Communism with the left-wing phenomenon. He underlined that extremist ideologies and groups can be classified and analyzed in the same terms as democratic groups, i.e., right, left, and center.

Political Man was published and republished in several editions, sold more than 400,000 copies and was translated into 20 languages, including: Vietnamese, Bengali, and Serbo-Croatian.

=== "Cleavage Structures, Party Systems, and Voter Alignments" ===
In 1967, Lipset co-authored work with Stein Rokkan, Lipset introduced critical juncture theory and made a substantial contributions to cleavage theory.

=== The Democratic Century ===
In The Democratic Century, published in 2004, Lipset sought to explain why North America developed stable democracies and Latin America did not. He argued that the reason for this divergence is that the initial patterns of colonization, the subsequent process of economic incorporation of the new colonies, and the wars of independence varied. The divergent histories of Britain and Iberia are seen as creating different cultural legacies that affected the prospects of democracy.

== Public affairs ==
Lipset left the Socialist Party in 1960 and later described himself as a centrist, deeply influenced by Alexis de Tocqueville, George Washington, Aristotle, and Max Weber. He became active within the Democratic Party's conservative wing, and associated with neoconservatives, without calling himself one.

Lipset was vice chair of the board of directors of the United States Institute of Peace, a board member of the Albert Shanker Institute, a member of the US Board of Foreign Scholarships, co-chair of the Committee for Labor Law Reform, co-chair of the Committee for an Effective UNESCO, and consultant to the National Endowment for the Humanities, the National Humanities Institute, the National Endowment for Democracy, and the American Jewish Committee.

Lipset was a strong supporter of the state of Israel, and was President of the American Professors for Peace in the Middle East, chair of the National B'nai B'rith Hillel Commission and the Faculty Advisory Cabinet of the United Jewish Appeal, and co-chair of the executive committee of the International Center for Peace in the Middle East. He worked for years on seeking solution for the Israeli–Palestinian conflict as part of his larger project of research on the factors that allow societies to sustain stable and peaceful democracies. His work focused on the way in which high levels of socioeconomic development created the preconditions for democracy (see also Amartya Sen's work), and the consequences of democracy for peace.

== Awards ==
Lipset's book The First New Nation was a finalist for the National Book Award. He was also awarded the Townsend Harris and Margaret Byrd Dawson Medals for significant achievement, the Northern Telecom-International Council for Canadian Studies Gold Medal, and the Leon Epstein Prize in Comparative Politics by the American Political Science Association. He received the Marshall Sklare Award for distinction in Jewish studies and, in 1997, he was awarded the Helen Dinnerman Prize by the World Association for Public Opinion Research.

== Personal life ==
Lipset's first wife, Elsie, died in 1987. She was the mother of his three children, David, Daniel, and Carola ("Cici"). David Lipset is a professor of anthropology at the University of Minnesota. He had six grandchildren. Lipset was survived by his second wife, Sydnee Guyer (a director of the JCRC), whom he married in 1990.

At age 84, Lipset died as a result of complications following a stroke.

== Selected works ==
- "The Rural Community and Political Leadership in Saskatchewan." Canadian Journal of Economics and Political Science 13.3 (1947): 410–428.
- Agrarian Socialism: The Cooperative Commonwealth Federation in Saskatchewan, a Study in Political Sociology (1950), ISBN 978-0-520-02056-6 (1972 printing)
- We'll Go Down to Washington (1951)
- "Democracy in Private Government: a case study of the International Typographical Union." British Journal of Sociology (1952) 3:47–58 in JSTOR
- Union Democracy: The Internal Politics of the International Typographical Union (1956) with Martin Trow and James S. Coleman
  - "The Biography of a Research Project: Union Democracy." in Sociologists at Work: the craft of social research edited by Phillip E. Hammond. (1964)
- Social Mobility in Industrial Society with Reinhard Bendix (1959), ISBN 978-0-88738-760-9
- Social Structure and Mobility in Economic Development with Neil J. Smelser (1966), ISBN 978-0-8290-0910-1
- "Some Social Requisites of Democracy: Economic Development and Political Legitimacy." The American Political Science Review Volume 53, Issue 1 (1959): 69–105.
- "Social Stratification and right-wing extremism," British Journal of Sociology (1959) 10:346–382.
- Political Man: The Social Bases of Politics (1960), ISBN 978-0-385-06650-1 online
- The First New Nation (1963), ISBN 978-0-393-00911-8 online
- The Berkeley Student Revolt: Facts and Interpretations, edited with Sheldon S. Wolin (1965)
- Party Systems and Voter Alignments, co-edited with Stein Rokkan (Free Press, 1967)
- Student Politics (1967), ISBN 978-0-465-08248-3
- Revolution and Counterrevolution: Change and Persistence in Social Structures, (1968) ISBN 978-0-88738-694-7 (1988 printing)
- editor, Politics and the social sciences (1969)
- Prejudice and Society with Earl Raab
- The Politics of Unreason: Right Wing Extremism in America, 1790–1970 with Earl Raab (1970), ISBN 978-0-226-48457-0 online
- Rebellion in the University (1971)
- Education and politics at Harvard: Two essays prepared for the Carnegie Commission on Higher Education (1975) with David Riesman
- The Divided Academy: Professors and Politics with Everett Carll Ladd, Jr. (1975), ISBN 978-0-07-010112-8
- editor, The Third century : America as a post-industrial society (1979) online
- The Confidence Gap: Business, Labor, and Government in the Public Mind (1983) online
- Consensus and Conflict: Essays in Political Sociology (1985) online
- Unions in transition: entering the second century (1986)
- editor, Revolution and Counterrevolution: Change and Persistence in Social Structures (1988)
- Continental Divide: The Values and Institutions of the United States and Canada (1989)
- "Liberalism, Conservatism, and Americanism", Ethics & International Affairs vol 3 (1989). online
- "The Social Requisites of Democracy Revisited." American Sociological Review Vol. 59, No. 1: 1-22. (1994) online
- Jews and the New American Scene with Earl Raab (1995)
- "Steady Work: An Academic Memoir", in Annual Review of Sociology, Vol. 22, 1996
- American Exceptionalism: A Double-Edged Sword (1996) online
- It Didn't Happen Here: Why Socialism Failed in the United States with Gary Marks (2000), ISBN 978-0-393-32254-5 online
- The Paradox of American Unionism: Why Americans Like Unions More Than Canadians Do, but Join Much Less with Noah Meltz, Rafael Gomez, and Ivan Katchanovski (2004), ISBN 978-0-8014-4200-1
- The Democratic Century with Jason M. Lakin (2004), ISBN 978-0-8061-3618-9 online

== See also ==
- American civil religion – Sociological theory
- Comparative politics – Field in political science
- Democratization – Society becoming more democratic
- Juan José Linz – Spanish sociologist and political scientist (1926–2013)

== Resources on Lipset and his research ==
- Archer, Robin, "Seymour Martin Lipset and political sociology." The British Journal of Sociology Volume 61, Issues 1 (2010)
- Philipp Korom, "The political sociologist Seymour M. Lipset: Remembered in political science, neglected in sociology." European Journal of Cultural and Political Sociology 6:4 (2019), 448–473, DOI: 10.1080/23254823.2019.1570859 The political sociologist Seymour M. Lipset: Remembered in political science, neglected in sociology - PMC
