= Hanspeter Kriesi =

Swiss political scientist

Hanspeter Kriesi (born 1949) is a professor of political science. Between 2012 and 2020 he was the Stein Rokkan Chair in Comparative Politics at the European University Institute in Florence. Previously, he has been teaching at the universities of Amsterdam, Geneva and Zurich. He was born in Bischofszell, Switzerland.

His wide-ranging research interests include the study of direct democracy, social movements, political parties and interest groups, public opinion, the public sphere and political communication. He was the director of a Swiss national research programme on "Challenges to democracy in the 21st century" from 2005 to 2012. From 2014 to 2019 he has been the principal investigator of the ERC project "Political Conflict in Europe in the Shadow of the Great Recession".

Since summer 2019, Kriesi is one of the three principal investigators of the SOLID project that investigates the novel conflicts about sovereignty, solidarity, and identity in the European Union and asks what made them emerge and escalate during a series of recent crises.

== Awards ==
Kriesi won the Francqui chair for the 2015–2016 and in 2017 the Mattei Dogan Foundation Prize in European Political Sociology.

== Publications ==
- Hutter, Swen and Hanspeter Kriesi (eds.) 2019. European party politics in times of crisis, Cambridge University Press.
- Bernhard, Laurent, Flavia Fossati, Regula Hänggli and Hanspeter Kriesi 2019. Debating Unemployment Policy. Political Communication and the Labor Market in Western Europe, Cambridge University Press.
- Snow, David A. Sarah A. Soule, Hanspeter Kriesi and Holly J. McCammon (eds.) 2019, The Wiley Blackwell Companion to social movements, new and expanded edition, New York: Wiley.
- Kriesi, Hanspeter 2018. Revisiting the populist challenge. Czech Journal of Political Science 1: 5-27.
- Ferrin, Monica and Hanspeter Kriesi (eds.) 2016. How Europeans view and evaluate democracy. Oxford University Press.
- Hutter, Swen, Edgar Grande and Hanspeter Kriesi (eds.) 2016. Politicizing Europe. Integration and mass politics. Cambridge University Press.
- Hernandez, Enrique and Hanspeter Kriesi 2016. Turning your back on the EU. The role of Eurosceptic parties in the 2014 European Parliament elections, Electoral Studies.
