= Reinhard Bendix =

German-American sociologist (1916–1991)

- Born: February 25, 1916; Berlin, German Empire
- Died: February 28, 1991 (aged 75); Berkeley, California, U.S.
- Occupations: Political scientist; sociologist

Academic background
- Education: University of Chicago
- Doctoral advisor: Charles Edward Merriam

Academic work
- Institutions: University of Chicago; University of Colorado Boulder; University of California, Berkeley
- Notable students: Charles Perrow

Reinhard Bendix (February 25, 1916 – February 28, 1991) was a German-American sociologist.

== Life and career ==
Born in Berlin, Germany, in 1916, he briefly belonged to Neu Beginnen and Hashomer Hatzair, groups that resisted the Nazis. In 1938 he emigrated to the United States. He received his B.A. (1941), M.A. (1943), and PhD (1947) from the University of Chicago, and subsequently taught there from 1943 to 1946. He then taught for a year in the Sociology Department of the University of Colorado Boulder before moving to the Department of Sociology at the University of California, Berkeley, in 1947 where he remained for the rest of his career.

In 1969 Bendix was elected President of the American Sociological Association. From 1968 to 1970 he served as Director of the University of California Education Abroad Program in Göttingen, Germany. In 1972 he joined the Department of Political Science at Berkeley.

He held guest professorships at numerous universities, including at Columbia University, St. Catherine's and Nuffield Colleges at the University of Oxford, the Free University of Berlin, the University of Constance, Hebrew University in Jerusalem, and the University of Heidelberg.

Bendix built bridges between American and European sociology, and regarded himself as a mediator. Bendix introduced to American sociologists a new perspective, the comparative-historical studies, moving beyond their local boundaries. He argued that the constellations of legitimating ideas were not mere reflections of life conditions, or social structure, but independent and real forces. In his terms Americans may better understand their own history through its relation to the histories of European nations. The methodological problems raised by such comparisons could have inspired him to propose a philosophy of history, but that was not his goal.

Bendix, who was deeply devoted to teaching, died in Berkeley, California, in 1991 of a heart attack shortly after conducting a graduate seminar together with a young colleague.

== Awards ==
In the course of his lifetime, Bendix received many honors, including fellowships from the Fulbright Program and the Guggenheim, a grant from the Carnegie Corporation, as well as being named a Fellow at the Institute for Advanced Study, and was accepted into both the Woodrow Wilson International Center for Scholars and Wissenschaftskolleg zu Berlin.

He was elected a Fellow of the American Academy of Arts and Sciences in 1969. Bendix was a member of the American Philosophical Society and received honorary doctorates from the University of Leeds, Mannheim, and Göttingen.

Work and Authority in Industry (1956) won the American Sociological Association's McIver prize in 1958.

== Academic research ==
Bendix's major works are:

- Work and Authority in Industry (1956)
- Social Mobility in Industrial Society (1959), coauthored with Seymour Martin Lipset
- Class, Status and Power (1958, 1966), also with Lipset, is an anthology.
- Max Weber: An Intellectual Portrait (1960)
- Nation-Building and Citizenship (1964, 1976)
- Kings or People: Power and the Mandate to Rule (1976)

=== Nation-Building and Citizenship ===
Neil Smelser holds that Bendix's book Nation-Building and Citizenship: Studies of Our Changing Social Order (1964) "stressed Weber's historical-comparative work on politics" and "stands as a unique contribution to the sociology of modernisation, but it both extended and criticised that tradition, which held sway in the 1950s and 1960s." He notes that Bendix drew attention to the international phenomena of leadership and followership and this "internationalized" the study of social and political development before the appearance of dependency theory and world-systems theory in sociology.

The book popularized the study of European state building.

=== Kings or People ===
Bendix's Kings or People: Power and the Mandate to Rule (1976) is a comparative-historical work of great sweep. It traces the histories of many societies that experienced a transition from absolutist to democratic rule.

== Selected publications ==
=== Books ===
- —; Lipset, Seymour Martin, eds. (1953). Class, Status and Power: A Reader in Social Stratification. Glencoe, Ill.: Free Press.
- — (1956). Work and Authority in Industry: Ideologies of Management in the Course of Industrialization. New York: John Wiley and Sons.
- —; Lipset, Seymour Martin (1959). Social Mobility in Industrial Society. Berkeley: University of California Press.
- — (1960). Max Weber: An Intellectual Portrait. New York: Doubleday.
- — (1964). Nation-Building and Citizenship: Studies of Our Changing Social Order. Berkeley: University of California Press.
- — (1978). Kings or People: Power and the Mandate to Rule. Berkeley: University of California Press.
- — (1984). Force, Fate and Freedom. Berkeley: University of California Press.
- — (1986). From Berlin to Berkeley. London: Routledge.
- — (1988). Embattled Reason. Vol. 1: Essays on Social Knowledge. New Brunswick, NJ: Transaction Publishers.
- — (1989). Embattled Reason. Vol. 2: Essays on Social Knowledge. London: Routledge.
- — (1993). Unsettled Affinities. London: Routledge.

=== Articles ===
- — (1952). "Social Stratification and Political Power". American Political Science Review. 46 (2): 357–375. doi:10.2307/1950834. JSTOR 1950834. S2CID 145083994.
- — (1963). "Concepts and Generalizations in Comparative Sociological Studies". American Sociological Review. 28 (4): 532–539. doi:10.2307/2090069. JSTOR 2090069.
- — (1967). "Tradition and Modernity Reconsidered". Comparative Studies in Society and History. 9 (3): 292–346. doi:10.1017/S0010417500004540. S2CID 145740744.
- — (1974). "Inequality and Social Structure: A Comparison of Marx and Weber". American Sociological Review. 39 (2): 149–161. doi:10.2307/2094228. JSTOR 2094228. S2CID 147539565.
- — (Winter 1990). "State, Legitimation, and 'Civil Society'". Telos. 86. New York: Telos Press.

== See also ==
- Comparative historical research – Method in the social sciences
- Historical sociology – Interdisciplinary field of research
- Stein Rokkan – Norwegian sociologist (1921–1979)
