= Stein Rokkan =

Norwegian sociologist (1921–1979)

- Born: July 4, 1921; Vågan, Norway
- Died: July 22, 1979 (aged 58); Bergen, Norway
- Occupations: Political scientist; sociologist

Stein Rokkan (July 4, 1921 – July 22, 1979) was a Norwegian political scientist and sociologist. He was the first professor of sociology at the University of Bergen and a principal founder of the discipline of comparative politics. He founded the multidisciplinary Department of Sociology at the University of Bergen, which encompassed sociology, economics and political science and which had a key role in the postwar development of the social sciences in Norway.

== Career ==
Stein Rokkan was born on the Lofoten archipelago in the far north of Norway and raised in the nearby town of Narvik. Rokkan completed his gymnasium years in 1939, and he received a magister artium in political philosophy from the University of Oslo in 1948. Rokkan's studies were interrupted in 1943 when the German occupation closed the University of Oslo and he returned to the university after the liberation in 1945.

Rokkan then turned to empirical research, and studied at Columbia University, Chicago and the London School of Economics between 1949 and 1951. In the United States, Rokkan was a Rockefeller Foundation fellow at Columbia and Chicago from 1948 to 1950. At Columbia University, his work with Paul Lazarsfeld acquainted him with modern social research methods. At the London School of Economics, he met T. H. Marshall.

He subsequently worked at the Norwegian Institute for Social Research (ISF) from 1951 until 1957, and moved to Bergen in 1958, where he worked at the Chr. Michelsen Institute from 1958 to 1966. In 1966 he became Professor of Political Sociology at the University of Bergen.

Over the years Rokkan was three times a fellow of the Center for Advanced Study in the Behavioral Sciences, and a visiting professor at various universities (Manchester, Stanford, Geneva, the London School of Economics, the Instituts d'études politiques in Paris. He also held a permanent appointment as visiting professor at Yale University.

Rokkan co-founded, with Shmuel Eisenstadt, Morris Janowitz, and Seymour Martin Lipset, the Committee on Political Sociology (CPS) of the International Sociological Association (ISA) in 1960 and served as its secretary from 1960 to 1970. He was vice-president of the International Sociological Association from 1966 to 1970; president of the International Political Science Association from 1970 to 1973; chairman (from 1970 to 1976) and co-founder of the European Consortium for Political Research (ECPR); and president of the International Social Science Council (ISSC), which was founded by UNESCO, from 1973 to 1977.

== Awards ==
Rokkan received many awards. He was a foreign honorary member of the American Academy of Arts and Sciences, a foreign associate of the National Academy of Sciences of the United States, an international member of the American Philosophical Society, and a member of the Finnish and Norwegian Academies of Sciences. He received honorary degrees from the University of Uppsala in 1970, the University of Helsinki in 1971, and the University of Geneva and the University of Aarhus in 1979.

Rokkan's work "Norway: Numerical Democracy and Corporate Pluralism" (1966) was selected for the Norwegian Sociology Canon in 2009–2011 as one of 25 works that "had the greatest influence on sociology in Norway."

== Academic research ==
After focusing on individual voters, he turned his attention to the study of politics, especially the formation of political parties and European nation-states. Peter Flora's overview of Rokkan's oeuvre points out that the "unity of Rokkan work stems from his constant concern with the European nation-state and its democratization."

=== "Cleavage Structures, Party Systems, and Voter Alignments" ===
In this 1967 co-authored work with Seymour Martin Lipset, Rokkan introduced critical juncture theory and made a substantial contributions to cleavage theory. Peter Flora notes that the "initial analysis of the origins of cleavage structures and their transformation into party systems appeared in 1965 ... in German" in a version that "carried Rokkan's name alone."

Seymour Lipset and Stein Rokkan (1967) and Rokkan (1970) introduced the idea that big discontinuous changes, such as the reformation, the building of nations, and the Industrial Revolution, reflected conflicts organized around social cleavages, such as the center-periphery, state-church, land-industry, and owner-worker cleavages. In turn, these big discontinuous changes could be seen as critical junctures because they generated social outcomes that subsequently remained "frozen" for extensive periods of time.

In more general terms, Lipset and Rokkan's model has three components:

- (1) Cleavage. Strong and enduring conflicts that polarize a political system. Four such cleavages were identified:
  - The center–periphery cleavage, a conflict between a central nation-building culture and ethnically linguistically distinct subject populations in the peripheries.
  - The state–church cleavage, a conflict between the aspirations of a nation-state and the church.
  - The land–industry cleavage, a conflict between landed interests and commercial/industrial entrepreneurs.
  - The worker–employer cleavage, a conflict between owners and workers.
- (2) Critical juncture. Radical changes regarding these cleavages happen at certain moments.
- (3) Legacy. Once these changes occur, their effect endures for some time afterwards.

Rokkan (1970) added two points to these ideas. Critical junctures could set countries on divergent or convergent paths. Critical junctures could be "sequential," such that a new critical junctures does not totally erase the legacies of a previous critical juncture but rather modifies that previous legacy.

=== "The Structuring of Mass Politics in the Smaller European Democracies" ===
In this 1968 article, Rokkan elabores the idea that a process of democratization has to overcome four institutional thresholds:

- The "threshold of legitimation," based on the "effective recognition of the right of petition, criticism, and demonstration against the regime."
- The "threshold of incorporation," which revolved around the extension of "formal rights of participation" to opposition groups and their supporters.
- The "threshold of representation," which involves the lowering of barriers so as "to make it easier" for "new movements" "to gain seats in the legislature."
- The "threshold of executive power," which involves the "institutionalization of cabinet responsibility to legislative majorities."

=== Conceptual Maps of Europe ===
During the 1970s, Rokkan worked on the development of conceptual maps of Europe. These maps were presented in several chapters. These conceptual maps summarized the principles of geopolitical differentiation within Europe. Tilly remarks that these conceptual maps "cast new light on an old paradox: the fact that capitalism and national states grew up together, and presumably depended on each other in some way, yet capitalists and centers of capital accumulation often offered concerted resistance to the extension of state power."

== Influence ==
Rokkan has been described as "one of the world's leading social scientists since World War II", "one of the great masters of comparative politics", and "a leading international scholar during the second phase of the post-war social science with its foci on macro studies and international comparisons."

Rokkan has also been described as "one of the world's foremost researchers on elections" and "Norway's most influential social scientist of all times."

He influenced thinking about cleavage, comparative history, party systems and Catalan nationalism, among other topics. He helped launch a research tradition on critical junctures.

Rokkan was the creator of a series of models for state and nation formations in Europe.

Rokkan, along with T. H. Marshall, is credited with the establishment of "what has become the standard narrative of the evolution of modern democratic citizenship."

He is also known as a pioneer of using computer technology in the social sciences.

== Legacy ==
The Stein Rokkan Prize for Comparative Social Science Research has been awarded by the ISSC, the ECPR and the University of Bergen since 1981.

The Department of Comparative Politics has, since 1981, arranged an annual Stein Rokkan Memorial Lecture as a tribute to his memory.

The University of Bergen has a Stein Rokkan Centre for Social Studies and a Stein Rokkan Building at street address Nygårdsgaten 5.

== Selected works ==
- McKeon, Richard, with Stein Rokkan (eds.). 1950. Democracy in a World of Tensions. Paris: UNESCO.
- Rokkan, Stein (ed.). 1962. Approaches to the Study of Political Participation (ed.), Bergen: CMI.
- Rokkan, Stein. 1966. "Norway: Numerical democracy and corporate pluralism." In R. A. Dahl (ed.), Political Oppositions in Western Democracies, pp. 70–115. New Haven: Yale University Press.
- Rokkan, Stein. 1966. "Electoral Mobilization, Party Competition and National Integration", pp. 241–265, in LaPalombara, J. and Weiner, M., eds., Political Parties and Political Development. Princeton, Princeton Univ. Press.
- Merritt, Richard L. and Stein Rokkan (eds.). 1966. Comparing Nations. New Haven: Yale University Press.
- Rokkan, Stein (ed.). 1966.Data Archives for the Social Sciences. Paris: Mouton.
- Lipset, Seymour M. and Stein Rokkan (eds.). 1967. Party Systems and Voter Alignments: Cross-National Perspectives. New York: Free Press.
- Rokkan, Stein. 1968. "The Structuring of Mass Politics in the Smaller European Democracies. A Developmental Typology." Comparative Studies in Society and History 10: 173-210.
- Rokkan, Stein (ed.). 1968. Comparative Research across Cultures and Nations. Paris: Mouton.
- Rokkan, Stein, and Jean Meyriat (eds.). 1969. International Guide to Electoral Statistics. Paris: Mouton.
- Dogan, Mattei, and Stein Rokkan (eds.). 1969. Quantitative Ecological Analysis. Cambridge: MIT Press.
- Rokkan, Stein. 1970. Citizens Elections Parties. Approaches to the Comparative Study of the Processes of Development (Universitetsforlaget, Oslo; reprinted in European Classics of Political Science Series, Colchester. 2009).
- Allardt, Erik, and Stein Rokkan (eds.). 1970 Mass politics; studies in political sociology. New York: Free Press.
- Eisenstadt, S.N., and Stein Rokkan (eds). 1973-1974. Building States and Nations Vol. I-II. Beverly Hills: Sage.
- Rokkan, Stein. 1973. "Cities, States, and Nations: A Dimensional Model for the Study of Contrasts in Development", pp. 73–97, in S.N. Eisenstadt and Stein Rokkan (eds), Building States and Nations. Models and Data Resources Vol. 1. London: Sage.
- Rokkan, Stein. 1974. "Entries, Voices, Exits: Towards a Possible Generalization of the Hirschman model". Social Science Information 13 (1): 39-53.
- Rokkan, Stein 1975. "Dimensions of State Formation and Nation Building: a Possible Paradigm for Research Variation within Europe", in Charles Tilly (ed.) The Formation of National States in Europe. Princeton, NJ: Princeton University Press.
- Rokkan, Stein. 1981. "Territories, Nations, Parties: Toward a Geoeconomic-Geopolitical Model for the Explanation of Variation Within Europe", pp. 70–95, in Richard Merritt and Bruce Russett (eds.), From National Development to Global Community. London: George Allen & Unwin.
- Rokkan, Stein, and Derek Urwin (eds.). 1982. The Politics of Territorial Identity. New York: Sage.
- Rokkan, Stein, and Derek Urwin. 1983. Economy, Territory, Identity: The Politics of the European Peripheries. London: Sage.
- Rokkan, Stein. 1999. State Formation, Nation-Building, and Mass Politics in Europe: The Theory of Stein Rokkan. Edited by Peter Flora. Oxford: Oxford University Press. [A compilation of various works by Rokkan.]

== Resources on Rokkan and his research ==
- Allardt, Erik, "Stein Rokkan and the Twentieth Century Social Science", Stein Rokkan Centre for Social Studies, Bergen University Research Foundation. 2003, Working Paper 14 - 2003.
- Barrientos del Monte, Fernando, "Política comparada, Estado y democracia en la teoría de Stein Rokkan", REVISTA DE SOCIOLOGÍA Nº 26 (2011) pp. 9–36.
- Berntzen, Einar, and Per Selle, "Structure and Social Action in Stein Rokkan's Work." Journal of Theoretical Politics 2(2) (1990): 131-149.
- Berntzen, Einar, and Per Selle, "Values Count but Institutions Decide: The Stein Rokkan Approach in Comparative Political Sociology". Scandinavian Political Studies vol. 15, no. 4 (1992): 289–306.
- Bornschier, Simon, "Cleavage Politics in Old and New Democracies." Living Reviews in Democracy Vol. 1 (2009): 1-13.
- Caramani, Daniele, "Stein Rokkan: The Macro-Sociological Fresco of State, Nation and Democracy in Europe", in M. Bull et al. (eds.), Masters of Political Science Volume 2. London: Routledge/ECPR series, 2011.
- Caramani, Daniele, "Rokkan, Stein", in Kurian, G. (ed.), The Encyclopedia of Political Science. Washington, DC: CQ Press, 2010.
- Daalder, Hans, "Stein Rokkan 1921–1979: A Memoir." European Journal of Political Research 7 (1979): 337–355.
- Daalder, Hans, 'Europe's comparatist from the Norwegian periphery. Stein Rokkan 1921-1979', in Idem (ed.), Comparative European Politics. The Story of a Profession. London: Pinter, 1997, pp 26–39).
- Dahl, R., & Lorwin, V. (1980). "Stein Rokkan." PS: Political Science & Politics 13(1), 110-111. doi:10.1017/S1049096500008234
- Ertman, Thomas, "Otto Hintze, Stein Rokkan and Charles Tilly's theory of European state-building", p. 52-70, in Lars Bo Kaspersen and Jeppe Strandsbjerg (eds.), Does War make States?: Investigations of Charles Tilly's Historical Sociology (2017).
- Flora, Peter, "Introduction and Interpretation", pp. 1–91, in Peter Flora (ed.), State Formation, Nation-Building, and Mass Politics in Europe: The Theory of Stein Rokkan. Oxford, UK: Oxford University Press, 1999.
- Flora, Peter, "Rokkan, Stein (1921–79)", pp. 744–47, International Encyclopedia of the Social & Behavioral Sciences 2nd edition, Volume 20 (2001).
- Mjøset, Lars. "Stein Rokkan's Thick Comparisons." Acta Sociologica 43(4)(2000): 381-397. doi:10.1177/000169930004300411
- Mjøset, Lars. "Stein Rokkan's Methodology of Macro-Historical Comparison", Comparative Sociology 14(4)(2015): 508-547. doi:10.1163/15691330-12341356.
- Saelen, K. "Stein Rokkan: A bibliography", pp. 525–553, In P. Torsvik (ed.), Mobilization, Center-Periphery Structures and Nation-Building, Oslo: Universitetsforlaget, 1981.
- Seiler, Daniel Louis, "The legacy of Stein Rokkan for European polities: a short tribute." In: José M. Magone (ed.), Routledge Handbook of European Politics (2015).
- Stubhaug, Arild, Stein Rokkan. Fra periferi til sentrum. [Stein Rokkan: A Man of Several Worlds] Bergen: Vigmostad & Bjørke. [A biography of Stein Rokkan]
- Tilly, Charles, "Stein Rokkan's Conceptual Map of Europe" 1981-02.
- Tilly, Charles, Big Structures, Large Processes, Huge Comparisons. New York: Russell Sage Foundation, 1984; Chapter 8.
- Tilly, Charles, "Stein Rokkan and Political Identities", in Charles Tilly, Stories, Identities, and Political Change. Rowman & Littlefield, 2002.
- Torsvik, Per (ed.), Mobilization, Center-Periphery Structures and Nation-Building: A Volume in Commemoration of Stein Rokkan. Bergen, Norway: Universitetsforlaget, and New York: Columbia University Press, 1981.

== See also ==
- Comparative historical research – Method in the social sciences
- Historical sociology – Interdisciplinary field of research
- Reinhard Bendix – German-American sociologist (1916–1991)
- David Collier – American political scientist (born 1942)
- Robert Dahl – American political scientist (1915–2014)
- Barrington Moore Jr. – American sociologist (1913–2005)
- Charles Tilly – American sociologist (1929–2008)
