= The Invisibles (2017 film) =

- Theatrical release poster
- Directed by: Claus Räfle
- Written by: Claus Räfle; Alejandra Lopez
- Based on: Interviews and recollections of Cioma Schönhaus, Hanni Lévy, Ruth Arndt-Gumpel and Eugen Friede
- Produced by: Claus Räfle; Frank Evers
- Starring: Max Mauff; Alice Dwyer; Ruby O. Fee; Aaron Altaras; Andreas Schmidt
- Cinematography: Jörg Widmer
- Edited by: Jörg Hauschild, Julia Oehring
- Music by: Matthias Klein
- Distributed by: Tobias Film
- Release dates: 8 October 2017 (Hamburg Film Festival); 10 October 2017
- Running time: 110 minutes
- Country: Germany
- Languages: German; Hebrew

The Invisibles (German: Die Unsichtbaren – Wir wollen leben) is a 2017 German docudrama film co-written, co-produced and directed by Claus Räfle. The film presents the experience of four Jewish teenagers who survived the Holocaust by going into hiding in Berlin during World War II. It interweaves personal interviews, dramatic reenactment, archival footage, and narration. The main actors are Max Mauff, Alice Dwyer, Ruby O. Fee and Aaron Altaras.

== Plot ==
The film recounts the struggle of Cioma Schönhaus, Hanni Lévy, Eugen Friede and Ruth Arndt-Gumpel to survive their persecution as Jews in Berlin from 1942 to 1945. Their individual situations are re-enacted, and in interspersed interviews, they recollect and comment on their experiences. Their survival is attributed to resilience, luck, and help from others. Their saviours come from different walks of life, including ordinary German citizens, communists, Christians, and people working within the Nazi hierarchy. The helpers put themselves at great risk should their activities be known to the Gestapo, who work with a network of spies and informants.

=== Cioma Schönhaus ===
Cioma Schönhaus, aged 20, is spared from being sent to Auschwitz by pretending to be an employee at a munitions factory. Unfortunately, his parents are sent there and are killed soon after. Cioma pretends to be a German soldier in need of temporary lodging, as assigned by the accommodation office, and he moves from apartment to apartment. Some of the homeowners suspect or are aware of his Jewish heritage, but let him stay nonetheless.

With his education and experience in graphic design, Cioma finds work falsifying passports and other documents for Franz Kaufmann, a lawyer, who is helping people to escape the country. He works alongside Werner Scharff, who is soon caught by the Gestapo and sent to Theresienstadt Ghetto, a hybrid concentration camp and ghetto.

Cioma is spotted by a former classmate, Stella Goldschlag, who unbeknownst to him is a Jewish informant. He expresses his long-time infatuation with her and invites her to his hideout. Stella decides not to denounce him and bids him farewell, which the older Cioma believes was an act of love and mercy.

One day, Cioma accidentally leaves his bag on the train. His wallet and the passport photos of other Jews were stored within. A warrant is soon sent out for his arrest and he hides in the home of Helene Jacobs. He lives peacefully with her for some time, until she is betrayed by a friend and arrested. With nowhere else to stay, Cioma takes his forged military pass and impulsively cycles all the way from Berlin to Switzerland, hoping to cross the border.

=== Hanni Lévy ===
Hanni Lévy, aged 17, is taken in by a family after her mother's death. She works in a factory, sewing parachutes for the Wehrmacht, despite having a badly injured finger. The family protecting her are soon found out and arrested. Hanni sneaks out of the apartment and is taken in by a Christian friend of her mother's.

To blend into German society, Hanni dyes her hair blond and renames herself "Hannelore Winkler". During the day, she walks around in public where there are large crowds, learning to "look and move like everyone else"; her outward confidence helps her to hide in plain sight. Hanni's helpers also provide her with medical treatments for her finger and money for future trips to the hairdresser.

Hanni becomes homeless when her helpers are informed on and arrested. She sleeps in public bathrooms and on park benches, enduring fatigue and loneliness. She also frequently attends the cinema; her repeated visits are soon noticed by a young man and his mother, who are employed there. The young man, Oskar Kolzer, asks Hanni to visit his mother, Viktoria, as he has been recently drafted into the army; his father is now elderly and he fears that his mother will be left alone. Hanni agrees.

After Oskar leaves for war, Hanni properly introduces herself to Viktoria; she reveals her Jewish heritage and asks for a place to stay. Viktoria immediately takes her in, as does her husband, Jean. The two women form a close mother-daughter relationship and Hanni is finally able to sleep safely. Jean passes away during her stay.

When the war is over, Hanni and Viktoria are terrorised in their home by a Russian soldier. Due to her disguise, Hanni is unable to convince the soldier that she is Jewish and he threatens to return that night. Not wanting to wait for the Russian troops, the two women pack their suitcases and flee.

=== Eugen Friede ===
Eugen Friede, aged 16, lives with his Jewish mother and non-Jewish stepfather. The boy is forced to wear the yellow badge in public, while his mother and stepfather are exempt due to their secular marriage. Eugen is often harassed by German officers on his commute to and from work, though occasionally, strangers secretly show their support for him by sneaking cigarettes into his pocket.

Fearing for the boy's safety, Eugen's mother and stepfather send him to live with family friends, who are communists. The friends soon voice their dislike of Eugen and their fears of being caught, so they send him away to another communist family after two weeks. He is taken in by the Horn family, who treat him well. Eugen also develops an attraction to their teenaged daughter. He remains with the Horns for some time.

One day, Mrs Horn accidentally reveals to the local butcher that she is harbouring a Jew. With the home no longer being a safe hiding place, they send Eugen to live with Hans Winkler and his family. He befriends their teenaged son, Horst, and the Winklers allow the boy to wear Horst's Hitler Youth uniform whenever he needs to leave the apartment. The parents also pretend to their eleven-year-old daughter, Ruth, that Eugen is her cousin. Later, the girl questions their relation and demands to know who he is. After some time, Mrs Winkler decides to tell her daughter the truth, despite the risk that Ruth may betray her family. Thankfully, Ruth agrees to keep Eugen safe.

Some time later, the Winklers take in Werner Scharff and his girlfriend, Fancia Grün, both of whom escaped from Theresienstadt. Through Werner's recount of his survival, Eugen learns for the first time about "what they were doing to Jews" in the concentration camps. Horrified and incensed, Eugen joins Werner and the Winklers in their newfound resistance group, Community for Peace and Development. They produce leaflets that denounce the Nazi Party and state that Germany is losing the war; the leaflets are distributed into mailboxes throughout the city.

Next, Eugen stays with his parents in an attic room that Hans has found for them. Unfortunately, Hans and Werner are betrayed and arrested, and the Gestapo soon arrive to arrest the Friede family. Eugen is held in a deportation centre, awaiting a trial meant to incriminate the Winklers. Eugen's mother is sent to Theresienstadt and his stepfather commits suicide on the night of their arrest.

Eugen is later put in a dungeon along with other imprisoned Jews, spending a long, uncertain amount of time there. One day, without explanation, a German officer enters and allows him to leave. Once he steps outside, Eugen discovers that it is the 23rd of April, 1945—his 19th birthday. He hides for another couple of days until the Russian army arrives.

=== Ruth Arndt ===
Ruth Arndt, aged 20, and her brother, Jochen, convince their parents to join them in hiding. They are aided by the Gehre family, who are indebted to Ruth's father, a doctor who had saved their daughter's life. The Arndt family are initially hidden in separate residences, and soon reunite at the home of another former patient, who is also hiding Jochen's girlfriend, Ellen, and another man named Bruno Gumpel, who Ruth becomes close to. Their hiding spot is later compromised when an employee from the Office for Bomb Damage enters the home to check the apartment's size, acting on an order that citizens with large residences must take in people whose homes had been destroyed by the war. The Arndt family are separated again, with Bruno now missing.

Ruth and Ellen are placed together in another home. Bored with being confined, they dress like war widows and attend the cinema. The women are noticed for their attire, but are never questioned by the public. On their way back from the cinema, Ellen is recognised by Stella, who had been a former colleague. The two women flee back to their hiding place as Ellen explains to Ruth that Stella had been blackmailed into becoming an informant; the Gestapo had promised not to deport her family in exchange for her exposing underground Jews. Unfortunately, they later break this promise and Stella's family are killed in Theresienstadt.

Later, Ruth and Ellen find jobs as live-in maids in the household of a senior Nazi officer. He is aware of their heritage and protects them, even providing them with ample food. By June 1943, Berlin is declared to be "free of Jews". The women use this information to their advantage whenever people question their appearance.

In February 1944, a bombing raid begins in Berlin. Ruth abruptly leaves her job to join her family, who are hiding in a factory. They are overjoyed when Bruno suddenly returns, having been aided by the Gehres.

As the bombings continue through to 1945, the women in the family stay in a bomb shelter with other female evacuees; the men hide in the nearby coal cellar. When it is Ruth's turn to go outside to collect water, she notices the arrival of Russian soldiers and excitedly runs back to tell everyone that the war is over. Jochen and Bruno later step outside of the coal cellar and are spotted by two vengeful Russian soldiers, who assume that they are ethnic Germans. The men protest that they are Jews, but they are not believed. One of the Russian soldiers command them to recite Shema Yisrael if they truly are Jewish, threatening to execute them if they fail. Jochen and Bruno recite the prayer perfectly, stunning the soldier. He lowers his gun and tearfully embraces the survivors, revealing that he is also Jewish. He is relieved that Hitler had not succeeded in killing all German Jews.

=== Epilogue ===
The epilogue states that of the 7,000 Jews hidden in Berlin, 1,500 survived. Many who helped the survivors were named the Righteous Among the Nations by Yad Vashem, an Israeli official commemoration institute, an honour for those who risked their lives to save Jews. Those honoured as the "Righteous" include Anni and Max Gehre, Max and Clara Köhler, Hans and Frida Winkler, Elfriede and Grete Most, Viktoria Kolzer and Helene Jacobs.

Cioma Schönhaus successfully crossed the Swiss border by bicycle. He had four children and remained in Switzerland until his death in September 2015. Hanni Lévy was identified by a relative who brought her to Paris in 1946, where she lived until her death in 2019. She had become a great-grandmother of a large family. Eugen Friede survived the war and emigrated to Canada, but later returned to Germany. He lived until 2018 happily in the north-west of Frankfurt as a great-grandfather. Ruth married Bruno Gumpel in September 1945 and emigrated to the United States. They had two children and five grandchildren before her death in San Francisco in 2012.

== Cast ==
- Max Mauff as Cioma Schönhaus
- Alice Dwyer as Hanni Lévy
- Ruby O. Fee as Ruth Arndt
- Aaron Altaras as Eugen Friede
- Victoria Schulz as Ellen Lewinsky
- Florian Lukas as Werner Scharff
- Andreas Schmidt as Hans Winkler
- Sergej Moya as Ludwig Lichtwitz
- Lucas Reiber as Jochen Arndt
- Rick Okon as Bruno Gumpel
- Robert Hunger-Bühler as Dr. Franz Kaufmann
- Maren Eggert as Helene Jacobs
- Steffi Kühnert as Frau Gehres
- Swetlana Schönfeld as Frau Schirrmacher
- Naomi Krauss as Viktoria Kolzer
- Horst-Günter Marx as Oberst Wehlen
- Laila Maria Witt as Stella Goldschlag
- Adriana Altaras as Frau Schönhaus
- Lena Binski as Lina Arndt
- Silvina Buchbauer as Frau Wehlen
- Tania Carlin as Hildegard Burghardt
- Illia Chaikovskyi as Verratener Jude
- Ruth Gumpel as herself (archive footage)
- Eugen Herman-Friede as himself
- Pamela Knaack as Gertrud Horn
- Ulrike Lodwig as Anja Friede
- Hanni Lévy as herself
- Theresa Schneider as Kinobesucherin
- Cioma Schönhaus as himself (archive footage)
- Patrick Simons as Verratener Jude
- Chris Theisinger as NSDAP Mann im Cafè
- Oleg Tikhomirov as Sowjetischer Soldat
- Dietmar Voigt as Herr Schönhaus (Vater)
- Ralf Zillmann as Kripomann

== Production ==
The interviews with the survivors were conducted in 2009.

The screenplay was jointly written by Claus Räfle and Alejandra López.

The movie was shot between March 30 and May 4, 2016, in Berlin, Wuppertal and Wrisbergholzen (Lower Saxony). In Lower Saxony, scenes were also shot in the attics of the Bückeburg Palace that were used to represent hiding places in Berlin.

The premiere took place on October 10, 2017, in Berlin. Supplied with subtitles the movie had a limited release in the US on January 25, 2019.

Andreas Schmidt died on September 28, 2017, the role of resistance fighter Hans Winkler being the last of his life.

== Background ==
In May 1943 Goebbels declared Berlin "judenfrei" (free of Jews) while about 7,000 Jews had gone into hiding. They and their supporters were being hunted by the Gestapo and their minions. Helpers placed themselves and their families at great risk. The Gestapo also used Jewish informants who were pressured to cooperate. People hiding faced many difficulties: they needed shelter in a place where every person was required to be registered, the food situation was precarious and food cards were used because of food rationing, young men, unless in uniform, were suspect, luggage might be controlled, and lack of documents would lead to arrest and investigations. Towards the end of the war, bombing became a frequent occurrence, and the arrival of the Soviet army carried its own dangers. About 1,700 Jews hidden in Berlin survived the war.

== Reception ==
Reviews were generally positive, as the individual stories were "astonishing" and the four witnesses fascinating. Sheila O'Malley (rogerebert.com) found the memories of the four interviewees vivid and engaging, their testimony important as part of bearing "precise witness." Samantha Incorvaia said that the actors were able "to convey their respective survivors' tenacity and willpower to live". She also noted that a large portion of luck was necessary to survive. Jeanette Catsoulis of the New York Times critiqued the structure, finding the individual stories were too often interrupted for commentary. As well, she wanted to learn more about the motives of the helpers. In contrast to the New York Times review, Filmdienst in Germany appreciated the linkage of witness interviews to their individual stories throughout the film. Filmdienst described the witnesses as gifted narrators who provided dramatic re-enactments of their experiences.

== Literature ==
- Eugen Herman-Friede: Abgetaucht! Als U-Boot im Widerstand. Tatsachenroman. Gerstenberg, Hildesheim, 2004. ISBN 978-3-8369-5241-5.
- Cioma Schönhaus: The Forger. London: Granta Books 2007. ISBN 978-1-86207-987-8, translated from German:

Der Passfälscher. Die unglaubliche Geschichte eines jungen Grafikers, der im Untergrund gegen die Nazis kämpfte. Scherz Verlag, Frankfurt am Main 2004, ISBN 3-502-15688-3.

- Claus Räfle: Die Unsichtbaren – Untertauchen, um zu überleben. Eine wahre Geschichte. Elisabeth Sandmann Verlag, 2017
