= List of 2017 films based on actual events =

This is a list of films and miniseries released in 2017 that are based on actual events. All films on this list are from American production unless indicated otherwise.

== 2017 ==
- 6 Below: Miracle on the Mountain (2017) – survival drama film based on the true story of former professional hockey player Eric LeMarque, who finds himself stranded in the High Sierra during a fierce snowstorm and must use his wit and willpower to survive
- 6 Days (2017) – British-New Zealand action thriller film based on the 1980 Iranian Embassy siege in London
- The 8-Year Engagement (Japanese: 8年越しの花嫁 奇跡の実話) (2017) – Japanese romantic drama film based on an autobiographical book by Hisashi Nishozawa and Mai Nakahara
- 9/11 (2017) – action drama film depicting five elevator passengers trapped during the September 11 attacks
- The 12th Man (Norwegian: Den 12. mann) (2017) - Norwegian historical drama film about Jan Baalsrud, who escapes from occupying Nazi Germans on the island of Rebbenesøya, via the Lyngen Fjord and Manndalen, to neutral Sweden in the spring of 1943
- 55 Steps (2017) – German-Belgian drama film based on the true story of Eleanor Riese
- 1987: When the Day Comes (2017) – South Korean political thriller film focusing on the events that led up to the June Democratic Uprising in Korea
- A Bag of Marbles (French: Un sac de billes) (2017) - French biographical drama film about two young Jewish brothers who were sent by their parents to the Zone libre from occupied France during World War II
- A Prayer Before Dawn (2017) - British-American-French biographical prison drama film depicting the true story of English boxer, Billy Moore who was incarcerated in one of Thailand's most notorious prisons as he fights in Muay Thai tournaments to earn his freedom
- A Taxi Driver (Korean: 택시운전사) (2017) – South Korean drama film centring on a taxi driver from Seoul who unintentionally becomes involved in the events of the Gwangju Uprising in 1980, based on German journalist Jürgen Hinzpeter's interactions with driver Kim Sa-bok
- Above the Law (French: Tueurs) (2017) – French-Belgian crime thriller film based on the true story of a career criminal, who commits a bank heist with his crew, and is set up by corrupt police, for the murder of a judge investigating the 30 year old unsolved case of the mass murders of Brabant who had been duped into being at the getaway scene, and for killing bystanders who witness the murder
- Adiwiraku (2017) – Malaysian drama film chronicling the experiences of Cheryl Ann Fermando, a rural schoolteacher
- Aftermath (2017) – thriller film based on events and people surrounding the 2002 Überlingen mid-air collision of a passenger airline with a cargo jet
- The Age of Pioneers (Russian: Время первых) (2017) – Russian historical drama film about cosmonaut Alexei Leonov, the first human to perform a spacewalk
- Alias Grace (2017) – Canadian drama miniseries based on the life and trials of Irish-Canadian maid Grace Marks
- All Eyez on Me (2017) – biographical drama film based on the life and death of the American rapper Tupac Shakur
- All Saints (2017) – religious drama film about a small-town Tennessee preacher, Michael Spurlock, who attempts to save his struggling church as well as a group of refugees from Karen State, Myanmar, in Southeast Asia
- All the Money in the World (2017) – American-British crime thriller film depicting the events surrounding the actual 1973 kidnapping of John Paul Getty III in Italy and the refusal of his grandfather, The multi-billionaire oil tycoon, J Paul Getty, to cooperate the extortion demands of the Italian organized crime group known as ‘Ndrangheta
- American Made (2017) – biographical crime comedy film about Barry Seal, a former TWA pilot who became a drug smuggler for the Medellín Cartel in the 1980s and then, in order to avoid jail time, became an informant for the DEA
- American Playboy: The Hugh Hefner Story (2017) – biographical drama miniseries covering the launch of the magazine as well as the next six decades of Hugh Hefner's personal life and career
- Anarchist from Colony (Korean: 박열) (2017) – South Korean biographical period drama film about the life of independence activist Park Yeol
- Another Mother's Son (2017) – British war drama film based on a true story from the German occupation of the Channel Islands, about a Jersey woman named Louisa Gould, who takes in an escaped young Russian war prisoner
- Babs (2017) – British biographical drama television film about the life of British actress Dame Barbara Windsor
- Bad Genius (Thai: ฉลาดเกมส์โกง) (2017) – Thai heist thriller film inspired by real-life news reports of a major SAT cheating scandal
- Battle of the Sexes (2017) – British-American biographical sports drama film about the 1973 exhibition tennis match between Billie Jean King and Bobby Riggs
- The Battleship Island (Korean: 군함도) (2017) – South Korean epic historical action film about an attempted prison break from a forced labor camp on Hashima Island during Imperial Japan's occupation of Korea
- Beauty and the Dogs (Arabic: على كف عفريت) (2017) – Tunisian drama film about a college student seeks help after a brutal assault but faces a bureaucratic nightmare when she reveals that her perpetrators are police officers, based on a true story
- Beauty Mark (2017) – drama film following a poverty-stricken young mother who has to get money from a man from her abusive past in order to save her family, based on true events
- Becoming Bond (2017) – biographical drama film exploring the early life and casting of Australian actor George Lazenby as James Bond in the film On Her Majesty's Secret Service, his eventual decision to leave the role and the effect it all had on his career and the rest of his life
- The Big Sick (2017) – romantic comedy film loosely based on the real-life romance between Emily V. Gordon and Kumail Nanjiani
- Bingo: The King of the Mornings (Portuguese: Bingo: O Rei das Manhãs) (2017) – Brazilian biographical drama film inspired in the life of Arlindo Barreto, one of many actors who played Bozo the Clown in Brazil
- Bitter Harvest (2017) – Canadian-British historical romantic drama film depicting the Famine in Ukraine in the 1930s
- The Black Prince (2017) – Indian-British historical drama film depicting the story of Duleep Singh, the last Maharajah of the Sikh Empire and the Punjab area, and his relationship with Queen Victoria
- Bobbi Kristina (2017) – biographical drama television film based on the life of Bobbi Kristina Brown
- Bohéma (2017) – Czech historical drama miniseries about film stars of the First Republic during and after the Second World War, more precisely in a period 1938–1953
- Bomb City (2017) – crime film based on the death of Brian Deneke, the homicide that revealed the cultural clash between the local jocks and the punk community in Amarillo, Texas, and the result from the subsequent court case sparked debate over injustice in the American judicial system
- Borg vs McEnroe (Swedish: Borg) (2017) – Swedish sports drama film focusing on the famous professional rivalry between tennis players, Björn Borg and John McEnroe at the 1980 Wimbledon Championships, culminating in their encounter in the men's singles final, one of the most dramatic tennis matches of all time
- The Boy with the Topknot (2017) – British romantic drama television film about a Sikh man who brings his English girlfriend home, based on the critically acclaimed memoirs of British journalist Sathnam Sanghera
- Bram Fischer (2017) – South African-Dutch biographical film about South African lawyer Bram Fischer who defended Nelson Mandela and his co-defendants at the Rivonia Trial of 1963–1964
- Breaking the Limits (Polish: Najlepszy) (2017) – Polish biographical drama film about the life of Jerzy Górski
- Breathe (2017) – British-American biographical drama film that tells the story about Robin Cavendish, who became paralysed from the neck down by polio at age 28
- Britney Ever After (2017) – biographical drama television film based on the life of Britney Spears
- The Captain (German: Der Hauptmann) (2017) – German historical drama film telling the story of German war criminal Willi Herold, who assumed a stolen identity as a German officer and orchestrated the killing of deserters and other prisoners at one of the Emslandlager camps
- The Case for Christ (2017) – religious drama film based on the true story of atheist journalist Lee Strobel who looks to disprove his wife's Christian faith
- Chappaquiddick (2017) – political drama film detailing the 1969 Chappaquiddick incident in which Ted Kennedy drove his car into the Poucha Pond, killing Mary Jo Kopechne, as well as the Kennedy family's response
- Chasing the Dragon (Chinese: 追龍) (2017) – Chinese-Hong Kong action crime film about an illegal immigrant from China who sneaks into British-colonized Hong Kong in 1963 and transforms himself into a ruthless and emerging drug lord, based on real life gangster Ng Sik-ho
- Churchill (2017) – British historical war drama film about Winston Churchill in June 1944 – especially in the hours leading up to D-Day
- The Climb (French: L'Ascension) (2017) - French adventure comedy film telling the real-life story of Nadir Dendoune
- Clint (Malayalam: ക്ലിൻ്റ്) (2017) – Indian Malayalam-language biographical film about Edmund Thomas Clint, a child prodigy known for having drawn over 25,000 paintings during his short life of seven years
- Cocaine Godmother (2017) – biographical crime drama television film based on the life of Griselda Blanco
- Crowhurst (2017) – British biographical drama film based on the true story of sailor Donald Crowhurst
- Crown Heights (2017) – biographical crime drama film depicting the true story of Colin Warner who was wrongfully convicted of murder, and how his best friend Carl King devoted his life to proving Colin's innocence
- The Current War (2017) – historical drama film inspired by the 19th century competition between Thomas Edison and George Westinghouse over which electric power delivery system would be used in the United States (often referred to as the "war of the currents")
- Cyborgs (Ukrainian: Кiборги: Герої не вмирають) (2017) – Ukrainian war drama film about the Cyborgs, the Ukrainian defenders in the Second Battle of Donetsk Airport during the war in Donbas
- Daddy (Hindi: पापा) (2017) – Indian Hindi-language political crime drama film portraying gangster-turned-politician Arun Gawli
- Darkest Hour (2017) – British war drama film about Winston Churchill in his early days as prime minister during World War II and the May 1940 War Cabinet Crisis
- Dating Game Killer (2017) – biographical crime television film about serial killer Rodney Alcala
- The Death of Stalin (2017) – British satirical black comedy film that depicts the power struggle following the death of Soviet leader Joseph Stalin in 1953
- Detroit (2017) – historical crime drama film of the Algiers Motel incident during the 1967 Detroit riot
- The Disaster Artist (2017) – biographical comedy drama film chronicling an unlikely friendship between aspiring actors Tommy Wiseau and Greg Sestero that results in the production of Wiseau's 2003 film The Room
- Django (2017) – French biographical drama film about the life of Django Reinhardt
- Don't Tell (2017) – Australian drama film based on the true story of Lyndal, a young woman who had been sexually abused at a prestigious private school and, with the help of a determined lawyer, sued the powerful church that denied her abuse for ten years
- Dunkirk (2017) – British-American-French-Dutch epic historical war thriller film depicting the Dunkirk evacuation of World War II from the perspectives of the land, sea, and air
- England Is Mine (2017) – British biographical drama film, based on the early years of singer Morrissey, before he formed The Smiths in 1982 with Johnny Marr
- Film Stars Don't Die in Liverpool (2017) – British biographical romantic drama film about Academy Award-winning American actress Gloria Grahame in 1970s Liverpool and, some years later, her death from stomach cancer
- Final Portrait (2017) – British-American drama film about the friendship between Swiss sculptor, painter, draftsman and printmaker Alberto Giacometti and American writer James Lord
- First They Killed My Father (Khmer: មុនដំបូងខ្មែរក្រហមសម្លាប់ប៉ារបស់ខ្ញុំ) (2017) – Cambodian-American historical thriller film depicting 5-year-old Loung Ung, who was forced to train as a child soldier while her siblings were sent to labor camps during the Khmer Rouge regime
- Flint (2017) – biographical drama television film based on the Flint water crisis
- The Founding of an Army (Chinese: 建軍大業) (2017) – Chinese historical drama film depicting the founding of the People's Liberation Army at the beginning of the Nanchang uprising, known as the first major Kuomintang–Communist engagement
- Gabriel and the Mountain (Portuguese: Gabriel e a montanha) (2017) – Brazilian-French drama film telling the true story of Brazilian backpacker Gabriel Buchmann who travels through several African countries, some of the time with his girlfriend Cristina, and dies while climbing Mount Mulanje, Malawi
- Giant (Basque: Handia) (2017) – Spanish Basque-language drama film based on the life of Miguel Joaquín Eleicegui who suffered from gigantism and was known as the "Giant from Altzo"
- Gautamiputra Satakarni (Telugu: గౌతమీపుత్ర శాతకర్ణి) (2017) – Indian Telugu-language epic historical drama film based on the life of 2nd century AD Satavahana ruler Gautamiputra Satakarni
- Ghazi (Telugu: ఘాజీ) (2017) – Indian Telugu-language war film inspired by the events from the sinking of PNS Ghazi during the Indo-Pakistani War of 1971
- The Glass Castle (2017) – biographical drama film depicting Jeannette Walls' childhood, where her family lived in poverty and sometimes as squatters
- Going Vertical (Russian: Dvizhenie vverkh) (2017) – Russian sports drama film about the controversial victory of the Soviet national basketball team over the 1972 U.S. Olympic team, ending their 63-game winning streak, at the Munich Summer Olympic's men's basketball tournament
- Goodbye Christopher Robin (2017) – British biographical drama film about A. A. Milne and his son Christopher Robin Milne, the inspiration for the Winnie-the-Pooh books
- The Greatest Showman (2017) – musical biographical drama film inspired by the story of P. T. Barnum's creation of Barnum's American Museum and the lives of its star attractions
- Gunpowder (2017) – British historical drama miniseries based on the Gunpowder Plot in London in 1605
- Haseena Parkar (Hindi: हसीना पारकर) (2017) – Indian Hindi-language biographical crime film based on Dawood Ibrahim's sister Haseena Parkar
- Hostages (Russian: Заложники) (2017) – Russian-Georgian drama film based on a true story about a group of Georgian youngsters who try to escape the Soviet Union by hijacking a plane in 1983
- I Am Elizabeth Smart (2017) – biographical drama television film based on the Kidnapping of Elizabeth Smart
- I, Tonya (2017) – biographical sports drama film following the life of figure skater Tonya Harding and her connection to the 1994 attack on her rival Nancy Kerrigan
- The Immortal Life of Henrietta Lacks (2017) – biographical drama television film telling the story of Henrietta Lacks, who was diagnosed with cervical cancer in the 1950s, and whose cancer cells (later known as HeLa) would change the course of cancer treatment
- In Search of Fellini (2017) – coming-of-age adventure film inspired by the early years in the entertainment industry and a journey to Italy to "find herself" of Nancy Cartwright
- The Insolent Plant (Spanish: La planta insolente) (2017) – Venezuelan biographical drama film depicting the tenure of Venezuelan President Cipriano Castro
- The Institute (2017) – horror thriller film based on a true story of a young girl's treatment at The Rosewood Institute in Owings Mills, Maryland
- The Invisibles (German: Die Unsichtbaren – Wir wollen leben) (2017) – German biographical war drama film recounting the struggle of Cioma Schönhaus, Hanni Lévy, Eugen Friede and Ruth Arndt-Gumpel to survive their persecution as Jews in Berlin from 1942 to 1945
- Joaquim (2017) – Brazilian historical drama film depicting an account of the life of Brazil's national hero Joaquim José da Silva Xavier
- Jungle (2017) – Australian-Colombian biographical survival film based on the true story of Israeli adventurer Yossi Ghinsberg's 1981 journey into the Amazon rainforest
- Kartini (2017) – Indonesian biographical drama film about Indonesian woman emancipation heroine, Kartini
- Kharms (Russian: Хармс) (2017) – Russian biographical drama film about the Russian poet Daniil Kharms
- Khibula (Georgian: ხიბულა) (2017) – Georgian historical drama film about the first democratically elected president of Georgia, Zviad Gamsakhurdia
- Kiss and Cry (2017) – Canadian biographical drama film depicting the life of Carley Allison who suffered from a rare form of cancer
- Last Call (2017) – surrealist biographical drama film recreating the life of Welsh poet Dylan Thomas through flashbacks during the famous drinking binge at the White Horse Tavern in New York City which ended fatally during the fall of 1953
- Little Boy Blue (2017) – British crime thriller miniseries focusing on the murder of Rhys Jones in Croxteth, Liverpool in 2007
- The Long Road Home (2017) – biographical war drama miniseries telling the story of a U.S. Army unit during the first day of the siege of Sadr City in 2004
- Loving Pablo (2017) – Spanish biographical crime drama film about Colombian drug lord Pablo Escobar and the romantic relationship he had with the journalist and television presenter, Virginia Vallejo
- Loving Vincent (2017) – Polish-British animated drama film about the life of the painter Vincent van Gogh, in particular the circumstances of his death
- Mad to Be Normal (2017) – British biographical drama film portraying the story of Scottish psychiatrist R. D. Laing
- Madiba (2017) – biographical drama miniseries documenting the true lifelong struggle of Xhosa human rights activist, lawyer, political prisoner, and eventual president of South Africa Nelson Mandela to overthrow the oppressive regime of institutionalized racism and segregation known as apartheid
- Majaz (Hindi: मजाज़: ऐ दिल के गम, क्या करूँ मैं) (2017) – Indian Hindi-language biographical drama film based on the real life story of famous poet, Asrar ul Haq Majaz
- The Man Who Invented Christmas (2017) – Irish-Canadian biographical drama film following Charles Dickens as he conceives and writes A Christmas Carol
- The Man with the Iron Heart (2017) – French-Belgian biographical war thriller film focusing on Operation Anthropoid, the assassination of Nazi leader Reinhard Heydrich in Prague during World War II
- Mark Felt: The Man Who Brought Down the White House (2017) – biographical political thriller film depicting how Mark Felt became the anonymous source nicknamed "Deep Throat" for reporters Bob Woodward and Carl Bernstein and helped them in the investigation which led them to the Watergate scandal, which resulted in the resignation of President Richard Nixon
- Marshall (2017) – biographical legal drama film about Thurgood Marshall, the first African-American Supreme Court Justice, and focusing on one of the first cases of his career, the State of Connecticut v. Joseph Spell
- Mary Shelley (2017) – British-Australian-Irish-American biographical historical romantic drama film following Mary Shelley's first love and her romantic relationship with the poet Percy Bysshe Shelley, which inspired her to write her 1818 novel Frankenstein; or, The Modern Prometheus
- Matilda (Russian: Матильда) (2017) – Russian historical romantic drama film telling the story about the relationship between ballerina Matilda Kshesinskaya and Nicholas II
- Maze (2017) – Irish-British prison drama film about the Maze Prison escape of 38 Provisional Irish Republican Army (IRA) prisoners in 1983
- McLaren (2017) – New Zealand biographical sports film based on the life of Bruce McLaren, founder of the Bruce McLaren Motor Racing team
- Meesaya Murukku (Tamil: மீசைய முறுக்கு) (2017) – Indian Tamil-language biographical comedy film about Adhithya Ramachandran ("Adhi")'s early life
- Megan Leavey (2017) – biographical drama film based on the true events about a young female marine named Megan Leavey and a combat dog named Rex
- Memoir of War (French: La douleur) (2017) – French war drama film based on the 1985 autobiographical novel La Douleur by Marguerite Duras
- Menendez: Blood Brothers (2017) – biographical crime television film based on the lives of Lyle and Erik Menendez, two brothers who were convicted of murdering their parents in 1989
- The Mercy (2017) – British biographical drama film based on the true story of the disastrous attempt by the amateur sailor Donald Crowhurst to complete the Sunday Times Golden Globe Race in 1968 and his subsequent attempts to cover up his failure
- Michael Jackson: Searching for Neverland (2017) – biographical drama television film dramatizing the final years of Michael Jackson's life
- Milada (2017) – Czech-American biographical drama film following the life of Milada Horáková, a politician who was hanged by the Czechoslovak communist party on fabricated charges of conspiracy and treason
- The Miner (Slovene: Rudar) (2017) – Slovenian drama film following the true story of a miner, who discovers thousands of executed people in Barbara Pit massacre
- Molly's Game (2017) – biographical crime drama film about Molly Bloom who became known as the "Poker Princess" for organizing high stakes underground poker in Los Angeles that attracted A-list actors
- The Most Hated Woman in America (2017) – biographical drama film telling the story of Madalyn Murray O'Hair
- Murdered for Being Different (2017) – British crime drama television film based on the 2007 murder of Sophie Lancaster in the United Kingdom
- The Music of Silence (Italian: La musica del silenzio) (2017) – Italian biographical drama film inspired by Andrea Bocelli's childhood life until the beginning of his career
- My Friend Dahmer (2017) – biographical psychological drama film about American serial killer Jeffrey Dahmer
- My Name Is Lenny (2017) – British biographical drama film telling the story of Lenny McLean's life in the east end of London
- My Other Home (Chinese: 我是马布里) (2017) – American-Chinese biographical sports film focusing on basketball player Stephon Marbury's days in China playing in the Chinese Basketball Association (CBA)
- The New Edition Story (2017) – biographical miniseries about the R&B group New Edition, from their rise to fame as a boy band from the Orchard Park Projects of Roxbury, Massachusetts, to becoming a successful adult act
- New Trial (Korean: 재심) (2017) – South Korean crime drama film based on the 2000 "Iksan murder case" where a teenage boy was falsely accused of the murder of a taxi driver and spends ten years in prison
- Newton's Grace (2017) – historical drama film about John Newton, a slave ship captain and later Church of England pastor who wrote many hymns, including Amazing Grace
- Nico, 1988 (2017) – Italian-Belgian biographical drama film chronicling the last year of the life of German singer and model Nico
- Omerta (Hindi: ओमेर्ता) (2017) – Indian biographical crime drama film exploring the 1994 kidnappings of Westerners in India for which Ahmed Omar Saeed Sheikh was arrested and served time in prison and the plotting of murder of Wall Street Journal journalist Daniel Pearl in 2002
- Only the Brave (2017) – biographical drama film telling the story of the Granite Mountain Hotshots, an elite crew of firefighters from Prescott, Arizona who lost 19 of 20 members while fighting the Yarnell Hill Fire in June 2013
- Papillon (2017) – biographical drama film telling the story of French convict Henri Charriere, nicknamed Papillon ("butterfly"), who was imprisoned in 1933 in the notorious Devil's Island penal colony and escaped in 1941 with the help of another convict, counterfeiter Louis Dega
- The Pirates of Somalia (2017) – drama film about Jay Bahadur and his reporting on piracy in Somalia
- The Polka King (2017) – biographical comedy film about real-life Polish-American polka band leader Jan Lewan, who was imprisoned in 2004 for running a Ponzi scheme
- Poorna: Courage Has No Limit (Hindi: पूर्ण) (2017) – Indian Hindi-language biographical adventure film with Aditi Inamdar as Malavath Poorna, the youngest girl to climb the Mount Everest
- The Post (2017) – historical political thriller film depicting the true story of attempts by journalists at The Washington Post to publish the Pentagon Papers, classified documents regarding the 20-year involvement of the United States government in the Vietnam War
- Professor Marston and the Wonder Women (2017) – biographical drama film about William Moulton Marston, the creator of Wonder Woman
- Promise at Dawn (French: La Promesse de l'aube) (2017) – French-Belgian drama film about Romain Gary from his childhood through his service in World War II, and the story of his self-sacrificing mother Nina, who raised him alone
- Rebel in the Rye (2017) – biographical drama film about the life of writer J. D. Salinger during and after World War II
- The Rebellion of Lafras Verwey (Afrikaans: Die Rebellie van Lafras Verwey) (2017) – South African biographical drama film depicting the life and career of Lafras Verwey who worked as a clerk in the Civil Service in Pretoria for thirty years
- Redoubtable (French: Le Redoutable) (2017) – French biographical comedy drama film about the affair of filmmaker Jean-Luc Godard with actress Anne Wiazemsky in the late 1960s, during the making of his film La Chinoise
- Reis (2017) – Turkish biographical drama film about Recep Tayyip Erdoğan, the incumbent president of Turkey
- Rodin (2017) – French-Belgian biographical drama film depicting an account of the famous French sculptor's romance with Camille Claudel
- Roxanne Roxanne (2017) – musical drama film revolving around the life of rapper Roxanne Shante
- The Royal Exchange (French: L'échange des princesses) (2017) – French-Belgian historical drama film telling the story of an arranged marriage between the heir of France and the Spanish Infanta in 1721
- Salyut-7 (Russian: Салют-7) (2017) – Russian historical drama film about the 1985 Soyuz T-13 mission to the Salyut 7 space station
- Same Kind of Different as Me (2017) – religious drama film telling about Ron Hall's and Denver Moore's intersecting life journeys
- Sand Castle (2017) – war drama film centering on Matt Ocre, a young soldier in the United States Army, who is tasked with restoring water to a village in Iraq, based on the true events and the experience of the film's writer Roessner during the Iraq War
- Santiago Apóstol (2017) – Spanish biographical drama film based on the life of Santiago Apóstol
- Saturday Church (2017) – musical drama film loosely based on the LGBTQ+ outreach program, Art & Acceptance, at St Luke in the Fields located in the West Village of New York City
- Sekigahara (Japanese: 関ヶ原) (2017) – Japanese jidaigeki film recounting the Battle of Sekigahara, a six-hour battle in 1600 that brought an end to the Warring States era in Japanese history, as well as the political struggles that led up to it
- Shock and Awe (2017) – political drama film following a group of journalists at Knight Ridder's Washington Bureau who investigate the rationale behind the Bush Administration's then-impending 2003 invasion of Iraq
- Sicilian Ghost Story (2017) – Italian thriller drama film inspired by the story of Giuseppe Di Matteo who was abducted in 1996 and then brutally killed on orders of Sicilian Mafia boss Giovanni Brusca in order to silence his father, a cooperating witness
- Song of Granite (2017) – Irish-Canadian biographical drama film depicting the origins and rise of sean-nós singer Joe Heaney
- Stronger (2017) – biographical drama film based on the memoir of Boston Marathon bombing survivor Jeff Bauman
- Thank You for Your Service (2017) – biographical war drama film about veterans of the 2nd Battalion, 16th Infantry Regiment returning to the vicinity of Fort Riley, Kansas, following a 15-month deployment in Iraq in 2007
- Three Christs (2017) – drama film based on Milton Rokeach's nonfiction book The Three Christs of Ypsilanti of three patients whose paranoid schizophrenic delusions cause each of them to believe they are Jesus Christ
- Three Girls (2017) – British crime drama miniseries dramatising the events surrounding the Rochdale child sex abuse ring, and describing how the authorities failed to investigate allegations of rape because the victims were perceived as unreliable witnesses
- Tina and Bobby (2017) – British romantic drama miniseries based on the relationship between footballer Bobby Moore and Tina Moore
- Tom of Finland (2017) – Finnish-American biographical drama film about Touko Laaksonen, better known as Tom of Finland, a Finnish homoerotic artist
- Toofan Singh (2017) – Indian Punjabi-language biographical drama film about the Sikh militant Toofan Singh
- Train to Zakopané (2017) – romantic drama film depicting a true love story that lays bare how compassion and intolerance can, even in the most unusual of circumstances, be one
- The Upside (2017) – comedy drama film inspired by the life of Philippe Pozzo di Borgo
- Viceroy's House (2017) – British-Indian historical drama film telling the true story of the final months of British rule in India
- Victoria & Abdul (2017) – British biographical comedy drama film about the real-life relationship between Queen Victoria of the United Kingdom and her Muslim servant Abdul Karim
- War Machine (2017) – satirical war comedy film depicting a fictionalized version of events surrounding General Stanley A. McChrystal in Afghanistan
- The Whiskey Bandit (Hungarian: A Viszkis) (2017) – Hungarian action film about Attila Ambrus, a famous Hungarian bank robber
- The White Princess (2017) – historical drama miniseries depicting the story of the marriage of Henry VII and Elizabeth of York and how it effectively ended the Wars of the Roses by uniting the houses of Lancaster and York
- Women Walks Ahead (2017) – American-British biographical drama film about the story of Caroline Weldon, a portrait painter who travels from New York to Dakota to paint a portrait of Sitting Bull in 1890
- Wormwood (2017) – biographical drama miniseries based on the life of a scientist, Frank Olson, who worked for a secret government biological warfare program (the USBWL) at Fort Detrick, Maryland
- The Wizard of Lies (2017) – biographical drama television film depicting the fall of Bernie Madoff, whose Ponzi scheme robbed $65 billion from unsuspecting victims; the largest fraud in U.S. history
- Yadvi – The Dignified Princess (2017) – Indian biographical drama film depicting the life and times of Maharani Yadhuvansh Kumari, Patiala's Maharaja Bhupinder Singh of Patiala
- The Young Karl Marx (French: Le jeune Karl Marx; German: Der junge Karl Marx) (2017) – Belgian-French-German historical drama film about Karl Marx
- The Zookeeper's Wife (2017) – war drama film telling the true story of how Jan and Antonina Zabiński rescued hundreds of Jews from the Germans by hiding them in their Warsaw Zoo during World War II
