= Jeanette Spassova =

Bulgarian-German actress (born 1962)

- Жанет Спасова
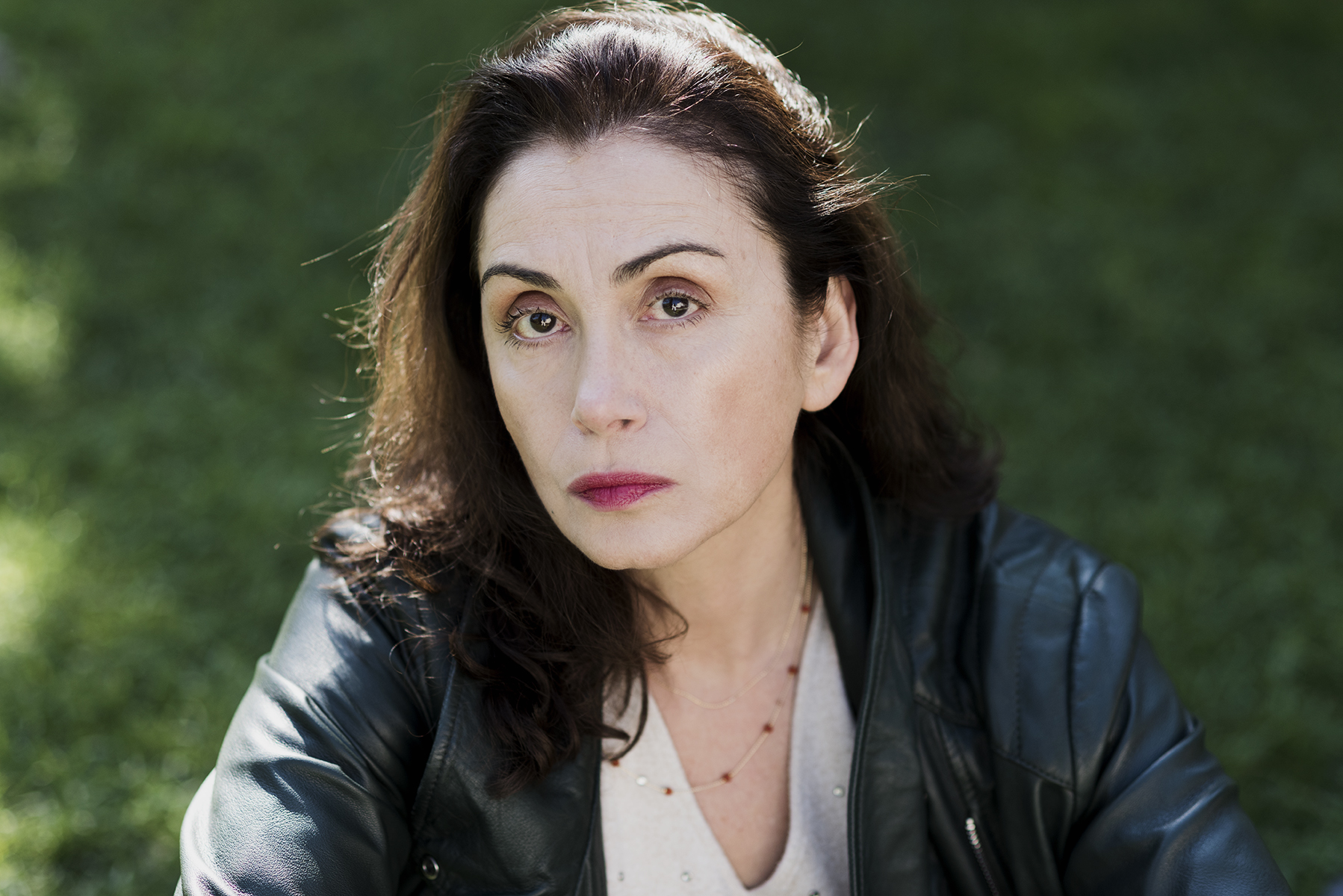

Jeanette Spassova (Bulgarian: Жанет Спасова, born 27 January 1962) is a Bulgarian-German actress.

== Life and career ==
The daughter of actor and general theatre administrator Vassil Spassov and his wife Teresa Azaryan (sister of director Krikor Azaryan), Spassova grew up in Sofia. She attended the Galabov Gymnasium, a German-language secondary school in Sofia, and then studied drama at the Krastyo Sarafov National Academy for Theatre and Film Arts. While still a student she met author and director Ivan Stanev. She was one of the founder members of Stanev's first theatre company, and together they developed their own special language for theatre. This provoked a fierce reaction from the board of censors in Bulgaria, an Eastern Bloc state at the time, and led to Stanev being temporarily barred from exercising his profession

In 1987 Spassova was engaged by the State theatre “ Sofia” in Sofia, where she made her debut in the role of Marie in Stanev's production Die Wunde Woyzeck. In 1988 Heiner Müller invited the company to stage the production in West Berlin. After this guest performance, which formed part of the Heiner-Müller Werkschau, Stanev did not return to Bulgaria. In 1989 he invited Spassova to Munich, where she played the leading role in Stanev's collage Betrogen/Gestern nach einem sonnigen Nachmittag at the Studiotheater Munich. In 1990 Spassova moved to Berlin, founded an international theatre company with Stanev and performed at the Hebbel Theater and the Podewil.

In 1996 she signed on with the Volksbühne am Rosa-Luxemburg-Platz and until 2000 performed there in numerous productions by Frank Castorf, Christoph Marthaler and Penelope Wehrli, among others. She went on to work as a free-lance actress in Basel (Theater Basel), Munich (Münchner Kammerspiele) and Salzburg (Salzburger Festspiele) and continued to work with Ivan Stanev and his ensemble in Berlin and France.

In 2004 she returned to the Volksbühne in Berlin and until 2017 remained there as a permanent member of the company. In addition to her work in theatre, Spassova has also played parts in many radio plays and audio books.

Her first roles as a film actress were in Tom Toelle's Bismarck, Stanev's Villa dei Misteri and Luxor Las Vegas and in Castorf's Dämonen and Der Idiot.

In 2012 Spassova played the leading role in the Bulgarian feature film "Az sum Ti" (English: "I am You") and received several awards for her performance. In 2013 "Az sum Ti" was screened at the 16th Shanghai International Film Festival.

2024 she retourned to Volksbühne,Berlin, were she played in two plays, directed by Silvia Rieger.

2026 Jeanette Spassova was invited to have a master class in Sofia, Bulgaria, in the theatre " Sfumato", based on the early work of Bertolt Brecht.

== Work in theatre (selection) ==
- 1989: Betrogen/Gestern an einem sonnigen Nachmittag von Pinter / Müller - Regie: Ivan Stanev
- 1990: Schuld und Bühne von Ivan Stanev - Regie: Ivan Stanev
- 1991: Hermaphroditus von Ivan Stanev - Regie: Ivan Stanev
- 1992: Brüderchen und Schwesterchen von Ivan Stanev - Regie: Ivan Stanev
- 1993: Die Mutter von Witkiewitch - Regie: Peter Staatsmann
- 1995: Die Möwe von Tschechow - Regie: Ivan Stanev
- 1996: Hochzeitsreise von Sorokin - Regie: Frank Castorf
- 1996: Anne Sexton - Regie: Penelope. Wehrli
- 1997: Des Teufels General von Zuckmeyer - Regie: Frank Castorf
- 1998: Sprechen/Schweigen nach Ionesco, Wittgenstein - Regie: Ivan Stanev
- 1998: Good night, Ladies nach Schakespeare - Regie: Ivan Stanev
- 1999: Don Juan im Kumpelnest 2000 von Ivan Stanev - Regie: Ivan Stanev
- 1999: Dämonen von Dostojewski - Regie: Frank Castorf
- 2000: Le Bleu du ciel von George Bataille - Regie: Ivan Stanev
- 2001: Erniedrigte und Beleidigte von Dostojewski - Regie: Frank Castorf
- 2001: Macbeth von Schakespeare - Regie: Calixto Bieito
- 2001: Glaube, Liebe, Hoffnung von Horvath - Regie: Albrecht Hirche
- 2002: Der Idiot von Dostojewski - Regie: Frank Castorf
- 2002: Luxor Las Vegas von Ivan Stanev - Regie: Ivan Stanev
- 2004: Kokain von Pitigrilli - Regie: Frank Castorf
- 2004: Meine Schneekönigin von Andersen - Regie: Frank Castorf
- 2004: Hollywood forever von Ivan Stanev - Regie: Ivan Stanev
- 2005: Schuld und Sühne von Dostojewski - Regie: Frank Castorf
- 2006: Im Dickicht der Städte von Brecht - Regie: Frank Castorf
- 2007: De Frau - Regie: Jonathan Meese
- 2008: Maßnahme/Mauser von Brecht, Müller - Regie: Frank Castorf
- 2008: Kean von Dumas - Regie: Frank Castorf
- 2009: Mord im Burgtheater von Ivan Stanev - Regie: Ivan Stanev
- 2010: Nach Moskau, nach Moskau von Tschechow - Regie: Frank Castorf
- 2012: Fucking Liberty von Ulli Lommel - Regie: Ulli Lommel
- 2014: "Bitte bei TOTLEBEN klingeln" - Text, Regie: Ivan Stanev
- 2015: "Kaputt" von Malaparte - Regie Frank Castorf
- 2015: "Verbrennung" von Wajdi Mouawad - Regie Carolin Mylord
- 2016: "Locus Solus" von Raymond Roussel - Regie Christof Garbaczewski
- 2017: "Die Reise nach Petuschki" von Wenedikt Jerofeev, Volksbühne Berlin - Regie: S.Klink
- 2017: "Scherzo di Follia", freie Theaterproduktion Berlin - Text und Regie: Ivan Stanev
- 2017: "Das Milleu der Toten", Stimme, Produktion: Mobile Akademie, Theater der Welt
- 2018: "Liberté", Volksbühne Berlin; Text, Regie: Albert Serra
- 2018: "Place Fantôme"", Hauptstadtkulturfonds Berlin; Text, Regie: Ivan Stanev
- 2020/2021 " Heldenplatz" T. Bernhard, Regie: Falk Richter, Münchner Kammerspiele
- 2024/2025 " Schmeiss die Oma aus dem Zug", Textkollage, Regie: Silvia Rieger, Volksbühne, Berlin
- 2025/2026 " Schiwagos Enkel", Textkollage, Regie: Silvia Rieger, Volksbühne, Berlin

== Radio plays and audio books ==
- "Solea" von Izzo - Regie: Ulrich Gerhardt, DLR Kultur 2003
- "Zwei sehr ernsthafte Damen" von Bowles - Regie: Heike Tauch, DLR Kultur, 2005
- "Mosaik" von Beyer - Regie: Klaus Buhlert, HR/DLF 2005, Hörspiel des Monats November 2005, Hörspiel des Jahres 2005
- "Stilleben in einem Graben" von Paradino - Regie: Steffen Moratz, MDR, 2006
- "Urfaust" von Goethe - Regie: Leonhard Koppelmann, Hörbuch Argon Verlag, 2007
- "Kurze Geschichte des Traktors auf Ukrainisch" von Levicka - Regie: Oliver Sturm, MDR Figaro
- "Schöne Aussicht" von Röhrig - Regie: Götz Fritsch, MDR 2008
- "Ein Held unserer Zeit" von Lermontow, Regie: Oliver Sturm, HR/SWR/DLF 2008
- "Der Mann ohne Eigenschaften" von Robert Musil - Regie: Klaus Buhlert, BR
- "Der Schlafwandler" von Hermann Broch - Regie: Klaus Buhlert, BR
- "Der Process" von Franz Kafka - Regie: Klaus Buhlert, BR 2011, Hörspiel des Monats Dezember, 2010
- "Galaveranstaltung" von David Mairowitz - Regie David Mairowitz, RBB 2016
- "Das Ende der Paraden" von Ford Madox Ford - Regie: Klaus Buhlert, BR 2017
- "Echokammer", Regie: David Lindemann, DRadio
- " Die Erschöpften" Hörspielserie, Text, Regie: Oliver Sturm, 2025, NDR
- " Die Angestellten", 2025 DRadio
- "Wie gewohnt freundlich", Text, Regie: David Lindemann 2026, DRadio

== Filmography (selection) ==
- Bismarck - Regie: Tom Toelle
- Villa dei Misteri - Buch, Regie: Ivan Stanev
- Luxor Las Vegas - Buch, Regie: Ivan Stanev
- Dämonen von Dostojewski - Regie: Frank Castorf, 2000
- Der Idiot von Dostojewski - Regie: Frank Castorf, 2002
- Az sum ti (I am You) - Regie: Petar Popzlatev, 2012
- Moghen Paris - Regie Katharina Copony, 2016
- Kundschafter des Friedens - Robert Thalheim, 2017
- Rabiye Kurnaz gegen George W. Bush - Regie Andreas Dresen, 2020
- Das Privileg - Regie Katharina Schöne und Felix Fuchssteiner, 2021
- Tatort - Macht der Familie - Regie Niki Stein, 2021
- Stella. A Life. - Regie Kilian Riedhof, 2023
- Tatort " Das Mädchen, das allein nach Hause kam", 2024

== Awards ==
- Golden Rose (Zlatna Rosa), Varna 2012
- Bulgarian Film Academy, Best Actress 2012
- " Die Erschöpften" Hörspiel des Jahres 2025
- " Rabye Kurnaz gegen George W.Bush" Silberner Bär
