= Stella. A Life. =

- German: Stella. Ein Leben.
- Directed by: Kilian Riedhof
- Written by: Marc Blöbaum; Jan Braren; Kilian Riedhof
- Produced by: Michael Lehmann; Katrin Goetter; Ira Wysocki
- Starring: Paula Beer; Jannis Niewöhner; Katja Riemann
- Cinematography: Benedict Neuenfels
- Edited by: Andrea Mertens
- Music by: Peter Hinderthür
- Production company: Letterbox Filmproduktion
- Distributed by: Majestic Filmverleih
- Release dates: September 2023 (Zurich Film Festival); 25 January 2024 (Germany)
- Running time: 121 minutes
- Countries: Germany; Austria; Switzerland; United Kingdom
- Language: German

Stella. A Life. (German: Stella. Ein Leben.) is a 2023 German biographical drama film. This is based on the true story of Stella Goldschlag, who delivered hundreds of fellow Jews to the Gestapo from September 1943 until the end of the war. Paula Beer plays Stella.

The film premiered at the 2023 Zurich Film Festival. It went on to be shortlisted as the German submission for the Academy Award for Best International Feature Film for the 97th Academy Awards.

== Plot ==
In 1940 Berlin, Stella Goldschlag is a vivacious, talented young woman in Nazi Berlin working as a Jazz singer despite the repressive climate and the risk of passing as a non-Jew.

When tides turn and she is forced into hiding with her parents, Stella begins working with a passport forger. Exposed and captured by the Gestapo, she faces the most dire and deadly of choices: face deportation to Auschwitz for herself and her parents or become an informant for the Gestapo identifying Jews hiding in Berlin. After the war, Stella is put on trial.

== Cast ==
- Paula Beer as Stella Goldschlag
- Jannis Niewöhner as Rolf Isaaksohn
- Katja Riemann as Toni Goldschlag
- Lukas Miko as Gerhard Goldschlag
- Bekim Latifi as Aaron Salomon
- Damian Hardung as Manfred Kübler
- Joel Basman as Peter
- Maeve Metelka as Inge
- Julia Anna Grob as Hansi Meyer
- Rony Herman as Heinz Gottschalk
- Max Krause as Günther Abrahamson
- Joshua Seelenbinder as Cioma Schönhaus
- Jeanette Spassova as Ms. Rotholz
