= Growing Up Straight =

Growing Up Straight may refer to:

- Growing Up Straight (Wyden and Wyden book), 1968
- Growing Up Straight: What Every Family Should Know About Homosexuality, a 1982 book by George Rekers
