= Stella Goldschlag =

Jewish Nazi collaborator (1922–1994)

- Goldschlag at her trial in 1957
- Born: Stella Ingrid Goldschlag; 10 July 1922; Berlin, Weimar Republic
- Died: 26 October 1994 (aged 72); Freiburg, Baden-Württemberg, Germany
- Cause of death: Suicide by drowning
- Other names: Stella Kübler; Stella Kübler-Isaaksohn; Ingrid Gärtner
- Known for: Nazi collaboration
- Spouse(s): Manfred Kübler (m. 1941; died 1943) Rolf Isaaksohn (m. 1944; died 1945) Friedhelm Schellenberg (m. 1957) unnamed (before 1994) Karl Gärtner (m. 1972; died 1984)
- Children: 1

Stella Ingrid Goldschlag (10 July 1922 – 26 October 1994), also known by her married names Stella Kübler, Stella Kübler-Isaaksohn and Ingrid Gärtner, was a German Jewish woman who collaborated with the Gestapo during World War II, operating around Berlin exposing and denouncing Berlin's underground Jews, after being tortured in Gestapo custody and falsely being promised the safety of her family. After the war, Goldschlag "converted to Christianity and became an open anti-Semite".

The number of people she betrayed or delivered to the Nazis has been estimated to be from 600 to 3,000.

== Early life ==
Goldschlag was born on 10 July 1922 in Berlin to a middle-class assimilated German Jewish family. Her father, Gerhard Goldschlag (1889–1944), was a conductor, composer, and journalist, and her mother, Antonie "Tony" Goldschlag (née Lermer; 1890–1944), was a singer. She was raised in Wilmersdorf, Berlin, and was an only child. The Goldschlag family often had economic troubles and sometimes had to rely on welfare, as Goldschlag's father struggled to find stable work.

Goldschlag went to elementary school and then attended the Hohenzollern Lyceum. After the 1933 seizure of power by the Nazis, she, like other Jewish children, was forbidden to attend a state school by Nazi racial policies, so starting in 1935, she attended the Goldschmidt School in Dahlem, set up by the local Jewish community. At the school, she was known for her beauty and vivacity, but she also stood out because she studied on a scholarship and was not from an affluent family. Goldschlag resented being seen as poor, and at times, she would even reject her Jewish ancestry by claiming that her mother was a Christian.

The family fell on hard times when the 1933 Law for the Restoration of the Professional Civil Service was used to purge Jews from positions of influence and her father Gerhard lost his job with the newsreel company Gaumont. Her parents attempted to leave Germany after Kristallnacht in 1938 to escape the Nazi regime, but were unable to gain visas for other countries. Goldschlag completed her education in 1938, training as a fashion illustrator at the School of Applied Art in Nürnbergerstraße.

== Going underground and collaboration ==
In 1941, Goldschlag married a Jewish musician, Manfred Kübler. They were former bandmates at Goldschmidt and met again when both were working as forced labourers in the Ehrich & Graetz factory in Berlin. Around 1942, when the large deportation programme of Berlin Jews into extermination camps began, she disappeared underground, using forged papers to pass as a non-Jew – often avoiding ID checks altogether. In early March 1943, Goldschlag and her parents, who had also been working as forced labourers by then, were arrested as part of the Fabrikaktion. Goldschlag was taken to Bessemerstrasse women's prison, where she was interrogated and tortured; on 10 July 1943 (coincidentally her 21st birthday), she managed to escape briefly during a visit to the dentist, but was quickly rearrested as she sought refuge in her parents' home, which was already being watched by the Gestapo, and she was brutally tortured once more after being recaptured.

On 24 August 1943, the Bessemerstrasse prison was bombed during an air raid, which damaged her cell and allowed her to escape yet again, but this time, she went to where her parents were being detained at the detention and assembly camp of Grosse Hamburger Strasse (the site of a Jewish cemetery that was desecrated and destroyed by the Nazis), intending on sharing their fate, but she was taken back to Bessemerstrasse.

To avoid the deportation of her parents and herself, she agreed to become a "catcher" (German: Greiferin) for the Gestapo, hunting down Jews hiding as non-Jews (referred to as "submerged", German: Untergetauchter). Goldschlag at first gave up names of Jewish fugitives only under torture, which happened for the first time after her failed escape attempt when she was captured with a list of names that included that of a Jewish man named Mikki Hellmann, who had provided her with a forged passport and whom Goldschlag lured into a trap, after which he was captured. Later, though, she started to collaborate with the Gestapo more willingly.

After collaborating with Hellmann's arrest, Gestapo investigators found out that Goldschlag had also been in contact with a prominent passport forger named Samson Schönhaus, who operated under the alias Günter Rogoff. Schönhaus was involved in an extensive Jewish-Catholic Polish resistance network and had provided at least 40 Jewish prisoners (in the camp in which Goldschlag was kept) with forged food ration cards, passports, and various other identity documents. Thus, Gestapo officers were desperately looking for Schönhaus, and upon discovering Goldschlag's connection to him, they offered her a more permanent arrangement collaborating with them and delivering Jewish fugitives to them: Schönhaus was able to escape to Switzerland after two of his compatriots were exposed, but Goldschlag's arrangement with the Nazis continued. She was promised that her parents and she would not be deported, and she would be paid a reward of 300 Reichsmark for each Jew whom she betrayed while she operated mostly around Berlin.

Goldschlag proceeded to comb Berlin for such Jews, and as she was familiar with a large number of Jews she knew from her years at Goldschmidt School, she was very successful at locating her former schoolmates and handing their information over to the Gestapo, while keeping up the façade as a Untergetauchte herself. Some of Goldschlag's efforts to apprehend Jews in hiding included promising them food and accommodation; she would also follow clues provided to her by the Gestapo. She also monitored funerals of ethnic Germans who were known or suspected to have married Jewish spouses and betray them to the authorities, as prewar marriages to an "Aryan" allowed some Jews to avoid detection. Estimates of the number of her victims vary, depending on the source, from 600 to 3,000 Jews. Goldschlag's charisma and striking good looks were a great advantage in her pursuit of underground Jews. The Nazis called her "blonde poison", while Jews in hiding knew her as the "Blonde Lorelei". She was also referred to as "the blonde ghost".

The Nazis broke their promise regarding sparing Goldschlag's parents and deported them, initially to the Theresienstadt concentration camp on 23 February 1944. Goldschlag pleaded with her superiors to spare her parents, but to no avail, but was promised to become an honorary Aryan after the war. Her parents were later transported to Auschwitz and murdered. Goldschlag's husband, Manfred, was deported in 1943 to Auschwitz, along with his family. His family believed that Goldschlag had betrayed even her own husband and in-laws to the Nazis, but the Kübler family was deported before Goldschlag's collaboration with the Nazis began.

While Goldschlag continued to hunt down Jews, her fellow "catchers", numbering around 15 to 20 by this time in Berlin, and she were targeted for revenge by their potential victims. An organization called the Society for Peace and Reconstruction (Gemeinschaft für Frieden und Aufbau or GFA) was actively planning to kill Goldschlag (and her second husband, Rolf Isaaksohn). A plan to poison her coffee was abandoned, as were plans to have her dentist poison her during an appointment and luring Goldschlag and Isaaksohn to an address by a rumor of Jews in hiding living there.

GFA instead sent Goldschlag a fake death sentence written on official court document paper and informed her that if she were seen on the streets [after the war] by one of their agents, she would be killed instantly. Even if the threat were only for intimidation, it was seen as a valid one, and Goldschlag's superior pulled the other members of the Search Service and her from the streets for two weeks and later issued them pistols for protection.

Goldschlag continued working for the Gestapo until March 1945. During that time, she met Isaaksohn and married him on 29 October 1944. Isaaksohn was a fellow Jewish catcher. Goldschlag was not as active as a catcher during this time, as she had been previously, because she was too well-known to be of effective use, and not as many Jews were left in Berlin due to the Nazi purges and the zealousness of Goldschlag and her compatriots—and those who remained in the city were too well hidden.

In 1933, the Jewish population of Berlin was estimated at 160,000, but by the end of the war, the Jews who had managed to remain hidden numbered between 1,400 and 1,700.

Goldschlag still continued to scout out addresses where Jews were known to have lived. Her loyalty to the cause was also questioned by her superiors and members of her team after she told her superior Dobberke that she could not find any more Jews and wanted to stop being a catcher. This was dangerous, as it put the other catchers and her at risk of deportation, and Isaaksohn vehemently denied Goldschlag's claims and told his superiors that they were operating very successfully in tracking down Jews.

Around this time, Goldschlag also became romantically involved with Heino Meissl, a publicist for a film company and fellow Jewish Nazi collaborator.

=== Final months of World War II ===
In February 1945, Goldschlag found herself pregnant, with the likeliest father being Meissl. While Goldschlag expected him to acknowledge his paternity and take care of her and their unborn child, Meissl instead vanished, leaving Goldschlag to fend for herself.

Goldschlag lost the support of any of her lovers and her Nazi superiors having other more pressing concerns with the advancement of the Western Allies, so in the early stages of the Battle of Berlin in April, Goldschlag went into hiding. The same month, she gave birth to her daughter, Yvonne, in Liebenwalde.

== Postwar life ==
She was found by the Soviets in October 1945 and arrested for collaboration. In custody, Goldschlag still claimed to have been victimized during the Holocaust, both as a cover and to claim Victim of Fascism (Opfer des Faschismus; OdF) status. In an attempt to corroborate this, in early 1946, she was accompanied to a Jewish Community office in Berlin to be registered, which would have made her eligible for additional food rations from aid services. Instead, Jewish survivors there recognized her immediately, and while an official protected her from being beaten up by an angry mob, the official did allow for her hair to be cut off.

Brought to trial, Goldschlag was found guilty and sentenced to 10 years of hard labor in June 1946. Her daughter had been taken from her to protect her from "having to suffer for her mother's sins" and was later placed with foster parents; when they emigrated to the United States, she was placed with another family in Berlin. In an ironic twist of fate, Goldschlag served out part of her sentence in Soviet NKVD special camp Nr. 7 (established at the former Sachsenhausen concentration camp) before being transferred to Torgau and Hoheneck fortress. The last part of her sentence was spent at Waldheim Hospital, where Goldschlag was treated for tuberculosis.

Following the completion of her sentence, she moved to West Berlin to find her daughter, who had been living there with a Jewish family, to no success. There, she was again tried, convicted, and sentenced to 10 years' imprisonment in 1957 for being an accessory in several counts of murder. During this second trial, Goldschlag denied all charges and claimed she was the victim of a Jewish conspiracy against her. Despite being convicted, she did not have to serve the second sentence because of the time already served in the Soviet prison. During the second trial, a psychiatrist diagnosed Goldschlag as a "schizophrenic psychopath".

After the war, Goldschlag, according to author Irving Abrahamson, "converted to Christianity and became an open anti-Semite". Goldschlag also tried to make contact with and gain custody of her daughter. When her first foster parents broached the idea of adopting Yvonne, Goldschlag so vehemently contested it that the adoption was called off.

As she became older, her mental and physical faculties deteriorated. By 1984, Goldschlag lived in Berlin-Spandau with her fourth husband. He died that year. Afterwards, she attempted suicide and was briefly hospitalised in a mental ward at University Medical Center Freiburg. She then moved to Freiburg.

== Death ==
In 1994, Goldschlag was found dead by drowning in the Moosweiher. The death was judged a suicide.

== Personal life ==
Goldschlag was married five times - following the deportation of her first husband, Manfred Kübler, she married fellow Jewish collaborator and Greifer Rolf Isaaksohn on 29 October 1944, who was shot dead attempting to escape to Denmark as the Soviets advanced. After the war, she was married to three non-Jews, starting with Friedhelm Schellenberg in 1957, and around 1972, she married Karl Gärtner, a Berlin train conductor, who died in 1984. In addition to that, she married a taxi driver whose name has not been disclosed who was 20 years her junior.

Goldschlag's only child, Yvonne Meissl, did not want to associate with her birth mother after hearing about her activities during the war. She became a trained nurse and emigrated to Israel in 1967.

== In biographies and fiction ==
Peter Wyden (formerly Peter Weidenreich), a Berlin schoolmate at Goldschmidt School whose family had been able to obtain US visas in 1937 and who later learned about Goldschlag's role as a "catcher" while he was working for the US Army, tracked down and interviewed Goldschlag in 1988 and 1990, to write Stella, a 1992 biography of her. Wyden said that in regards to the book, Goldschlag requested, mostly likely in jest, that he "not write badly about [her]".

Goldschlag is mentioned in The Forger, Cioma Schönhaus's 2004 account of living as an underground Jew in Berlin, and in Berlin at War by Roger Moorhouse (2010).

=== Fiction ===
In the 2001 novel The Good German, the character Renate Naumann (named Lena Brandt in the 2006 film adaptation) is loosely based on Goldschlag. The book was adapted as the 2006 film titled The Good German directed by Steven Soderbergh and starring George Clooney, Cate Blanchett and Tobey Maguire.

Goldschlag appears in Chris Petit's 2016 novel The Butchers of Berlin. Here, her actions as a "catcher" are in the background of the main story.

Goldschlag is a minor character in the 2017 German docudrama, Die Unsichtbaren – Wir wollen leben (English title The Invisibles).

In 2019, German journalist Takis Würger published a novel based on Goldschlag's life, Stella, which was published by Carl Hanser Verlag. It received largely negative reviews. Critics described the work as "Holocaust kitsch", but it sold well.

In 2023, a biopic about Goldschlag, Stella. A Life., was released, in which she is portrayed by Paula Beer.

== See also ==
- Jewish collaboration with Nazi Germany
- Betje Wery
