= Goldschmidt School =

Information
- Established: May 1, 1935
- Founder: Leonore Goldschmidt
- Closed: November 30, 1939

The Goldschmidt School was a private Jewish school that existed in Berlin, Germany, in the late 1930s. It was founded by Leonore Goldschmidt, a German Jewish educator, in 1935. Jewish children were barred from attending public schools in 1938.

The school served around 750 students. Among other subjects, students were taught English, French, and arts and crafts.

The school closed permanently in November 1939.

== Alumni ==
Notable alumni include Stella Goldschlag, who passed as Aryan and betrayed other Jews in hiding during the war. Peter H. Wyden also attended the school and later wrote a biography on Goldschlag.
