= Leonore Goldschmidt =

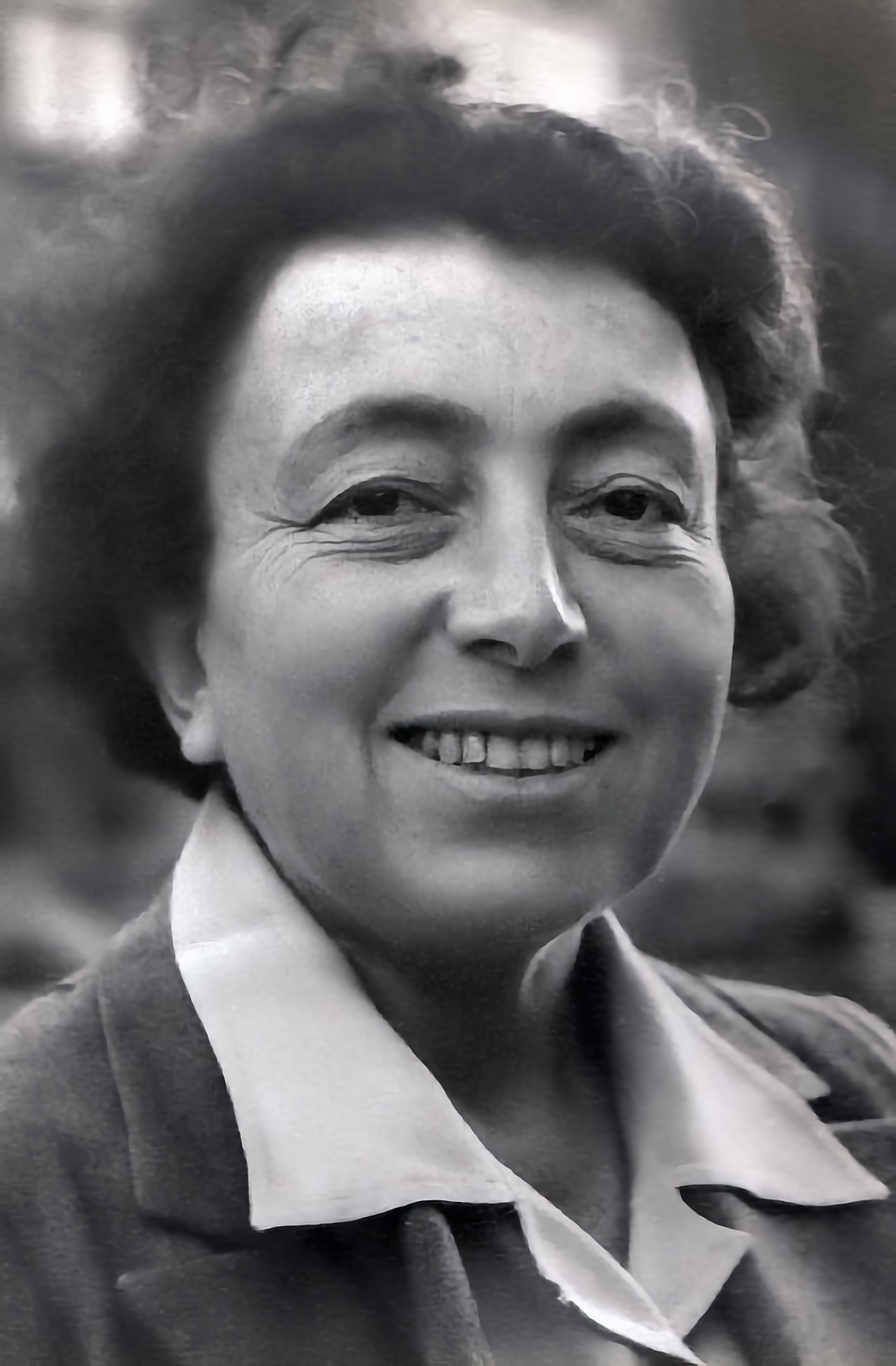
Leonore Goldschmidt

Leonore Goldschmidt (née Zweig; 17 November 1897 in Gosda/Brandenburg, Germany – 7 March 1983 in London, England) was a German teacher who founded the Goldschmidt School in 1935 in Berlin.

== Biography ==
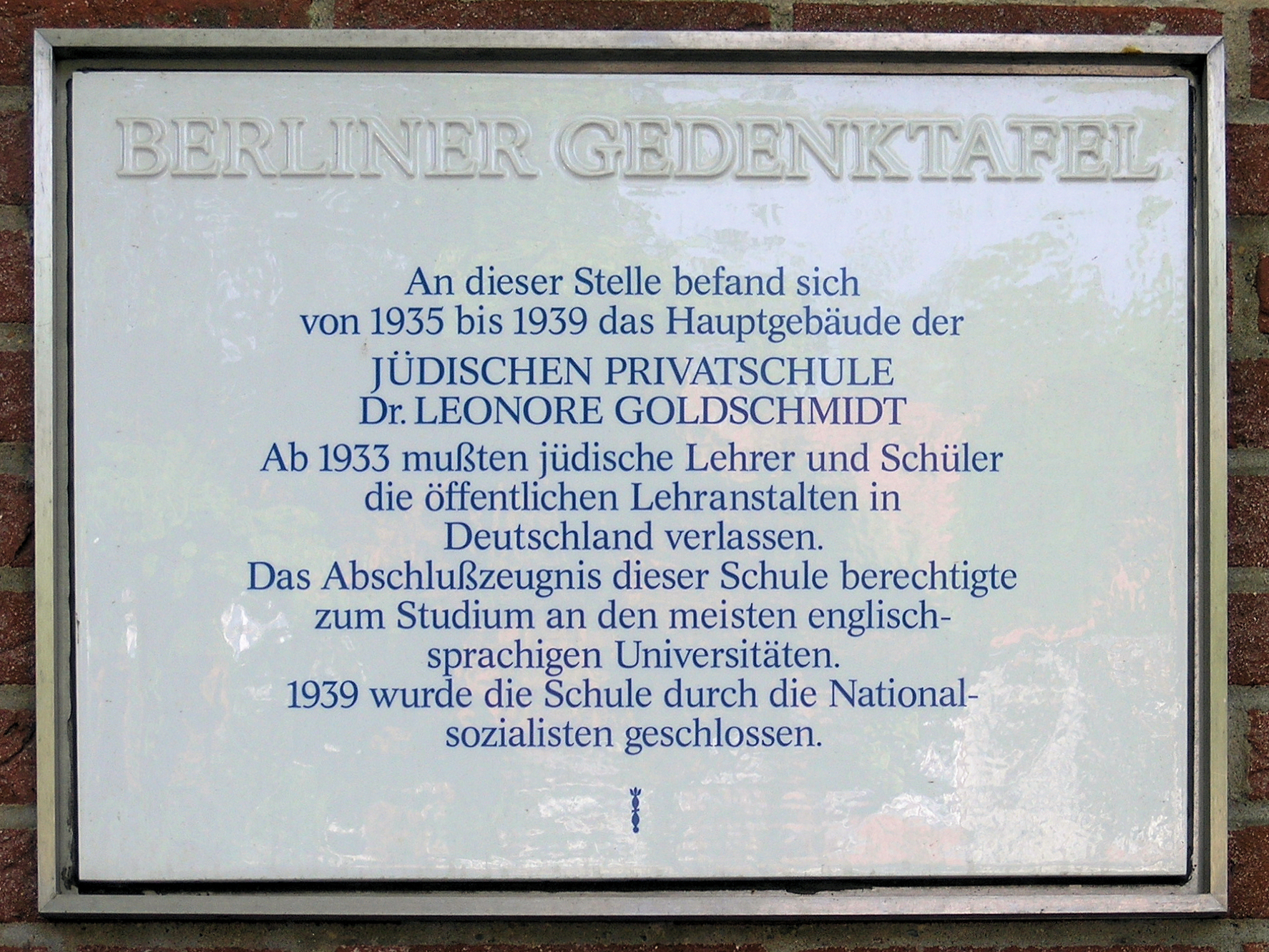
Commemorative plaque at Hohenzollerndamm 110a, in Berlin-Schmargendorf

Leonore Zweig was the daughter of Wilhelm Zweig, a brickworks owner, and grew up in a village in Lusatia. In 1916, she took her final school exams (Abitur) at the Grunewald-Gymnasium (since 1946 Walther-Rathenau-Schule) in Berlin-Grunewald. From 1916 to 1921, she studied English, German, and history in Jena and Berlin, and received a doctorate from Heidelberg University. In 1923, she married lawyer Ernst Goldschmidt. They had two children: Gertrud (1924) and Rudolf (1925).

Leonore Goldschmidt worked as a teacher in England and Berlin. In 1922, she was at the Cecilien-Schule in Berlin-Wilmersdorf, and from 1925 on, she was at the Sophie-Charlotte-Gymnasium in Berlin-Charlottenburg. In order to improve her English language skills, in 1931, she traveled to England and studied at the St Christopher School in Letchworth. There she met and befriended a Quaker couple, headmaster Lyn Harris and his wife Eleanor Harris. Their educational views, which included senior students being involved in decision-making and promoting freedom, shaped Goldschmidt's educational approach to teaching.

Being Jewish, Goldschmidt lost her position in 1933. In 1934, she worked at the Privaten Jüdischen Waldschule Grunewald (Private Jewish Forest School Grunewald), founded and run by Toni Lessler, at Hagenstraße 56 in Berlin-Grunewald. On 1 May 1935, Goldschmidt set up her own school in Berlin-Grunewald, at Kronberger Straße 24. In 1934, her cousin Alexander Zweig) had been murdered, and Goldschmidt received an inheritance with which she financed her project. The school expanded quickly and comprised four more buildings: at Hohenzollerndamm 102, 105–110, and Berkaer Straße 31. In 1937, the school had 520 students and 40 teachers.

The Private Jüdische Schule Dr. Leonore Goldschmidt (Private Jewish School Dr. Leonore Goldschmidt) was granted an official licence to run Abitur exams in 1936. The following year, the school became an Examination Centre of the University of Cambridge. The bilingual final examination enabled the students to enter English language universities in Europe and North America, making their emigration easier. When their school was officially shut down on 30 September 1939, the Goldschmidt family emigrated to England together with 80 students and some teachers. They reopened their school in Folkestone and continued until May 1940. Afterwards, Goldschmidt worked as a teacher at several private and state-funded schools in England until 1968. After her retirement, she studied Russian and lived in London until her death in 1983.

== Bibliography ==
- Martin Schönfeld: Gedenktafeln in West-Berlin. Editor: Aktives Museum Faschismus und Widerstand in Berlin e.V., 1993.
- Holger Hübner: Das Gedächtnis der Stadt. Argon Verlag GmbH, Berlin, 1997, ISBN 3-87024-379-1

== Documentary ==
Goldschmidts Kinder – Überleben in Hitlers Schatten, ARD, 2017
