= Paula Beer =

German actress

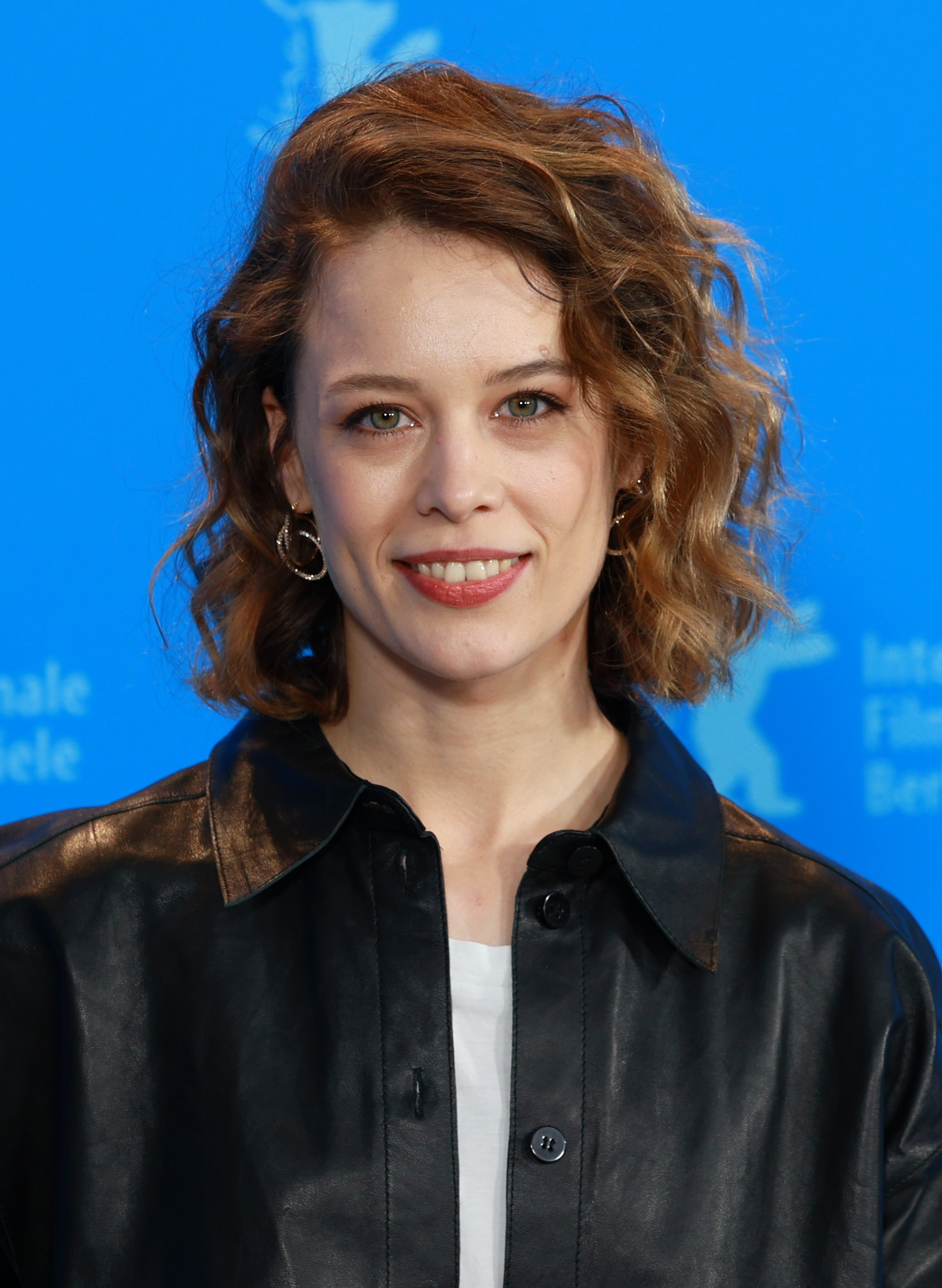
- Beer in 2023
- Born: 23 February 1995 (age 31); Mainz, Rhineland-Palatinate, Germany
- Occupation: Actress
- Years active: 2010–present

Paula Beer (German: [ˈpaʊla ˈbeːɐ̯]; born 23 February 1995) is a German actress. She is most known for her work with Christian Petzold in: Transit (2018), Undine (2020), Afire (2023), and Miroirs No. 3 (2025).

For Frantz (2016) she received the Marcello Mastroianni Award at the 73rd Venice International Film Festival alongside a nomination for the César Award for Best Female Revelation. For Undine (2020), she won the Silver Bear for Best Actress and the European Film Award for Best Actress.

== Life & career ==
=== Early life ===
Paula Beer grew up in Mainz as an only child. At the age of eight, she took part in a theatre course which, according to her own account, instilled in her a love of acting: "I was very afraid of it, but once on stage, I felt a sense of fulfillment," said Beer. After her family moved to Berlin in 2007, she attended a Montessori school. From the age of twelve, she gained further acting and dance experience with the youth ensemble of Berlin's Friedrichstadt-Palast theatre, where she was a member for four years. In 2013, she graduated from high school and moved to Paris.

=== Career ===
Beer in 2016

She first became known as a teenager for her main role in Chris Kraus' 2010 film Poll. In 2015, Beer made her television debut alongside Sven Gielnik and Joachim Król in Kai Wessel's Pampa Blues. That same year, Beer, along with Jella Haase, Jannis Niewöhner, and Moritz Leu, portrayed four teenagers in Theresa von Eltz 's 4 Kings, who voluntarily spend Christmas in a psychiatric hospital. Critics praised the performances of the four young actors and 4 Kings won the Bronze German Film Award in the Best Feature Film category. In the summer of 2015, Beer attended an acting course at the Drama Summer School of London 's Guildhall School of Music and Drama.

Her breakthrough came in 2016, when she starred in François Ozon's Frantz, for which she won the Marcello Mastroianni Award for Best Young Performer at the 73rd Venice International Film Festival. In the melodrama, shot largely in black and white, Beer played the fiancée of a German soldier killed on the French front in World War I, who meets a mysterious French ex-soldier (played by Pierre Niney) in Quedlinburg in 1919. After being cast in Frantz, Beer had six weeks to learn the role of Anna in both German and French. During filming, Beer and her co-star Niney helped each other with any language difficulties. Ozon remarked that Beer, who switches back and forth between German and French in the film, possessed a mischievous and deeply melancholic quality. He praised her acting range, credibility, and photogenic qualities: “She was only twenty years old, but her performance showed great maturity. She could embody both the innocence of a girl and the strength of a woman,” Ozon said of Beer. The film drew comparisons to the young Romy Schneider, and after filming Frantz, Beer spent a month in Marseille to further improve her French.

In 2018, Beer starred in Florian Henckel von Donnersmarck's Never Look Away, which was nominated for Best Foreign Language Film at the 91st Academy Awards.

In the following years she became internationally known for her performances in Christian Petzold's films, starting with Transit (2018). For 2020's Undine Beer won the Silver Bear for Best Actress at the 70th Berlin International Film Festival, alongside the European Film Award for Best Actress. She also starred in 2023's Afire, which won the Silver Bear Grand Jury Prize at the 73rd Berlin International Film Festival. In 2025, she again worked with Petzold in Miroirs No. 3 which premiered at the 78th Cannes Film Festival in the Directors' Fortnight section.

== Filmography ==
Year	Title	Role	Notes
2010	The Poll Diaries	Oda von Siering	
2012	Ludwig II	Sophie in Bayern	
2013	The Taste of Apple Seeds	Rosmarie	
2014	The Dark Valley	Luzi Gader	
2015	Pampa Blues	Lena	TV film
2015	4 Kings	Alex	
2016	Frantz	Anna	Marcello Mastroianni Award; Nominated — César Award for Most Promising Actress; Nominated — Lumière Award for Best Female Revelation; Nominated — European Film Award for Best Actress
2017	Prinz Aberjaja	Princess	Short film
2018	Transit	Marie	
2018	Bad Banks	Jana Liekam	TV series (12 episodes); Bambi Award for Best Actress
2018	Never Look Away	Ellie Seeband	
2019	The Wolf's Call	Diane	
2020	Undine	Undine	Silver Bear for Best Actress; European Film Award for Best Actress; Nominated — Chlotrudis Award for Best Actress
2023	Afire	Nadja	
2023	Stella. A Life.	Stella Goldschlag	
2025	Miroirs No. 3	Laura	
2025	Stiller	Julika Stiller	
