= Moon Lake (film) =

2009 film by Ivan Stanev

- Moon Lake DVD Cover
- Directed by: Ivan Stanev
- Written by: Ivan Stanev
- Produced by: Donka Angelova
- Starring: Yasna Bozhkova, Vasil Chitanov, Gloria Petkova, Simon Todorov
- Cinematography: Stefan Ivanov
- Edited by: Remco Schuurbiers
- Music by: Sebastian Meissner
- Production company: Delta Entertainment
- Release date: 29 November 2009
- Running time: 90 minutes
- Countries: Bulgaria, Germany, France
- Languages: English, French, German, Russian, Ancient Greek, Bulgarian, Esperanto, Spanish

Moon Lake is a 2009 Bulgarian-German-French art film written and directed by Ivan Stanev. The film was produced by independent Bulgarian producer Donka Angelova and co-produced by Stanev Films (Berlin) and Patrick Sandrin (Sofilm). It was presented at Sofia Film Fest 2010 and Cyprus International Film Festival 2012 and later curated by Kathrin Brunner and Oliver Czeslik (mYndstorm productions), Berlin.

Moon Lake has a nonlinear narrative structure and uses a leitmotiv technique with recurring themes and day dreams. It focuses not on suspense but on distorted contemplation. The film follows the parallel stories of two couples that represent the doomed lovers Orpheus and Eurydice of Greek mythology.

== Synopsis ==
Moon Lake does not have a well-defined storyline, logically coherent cues or a straightforward message. The movie draws inspiration from the Greek myth of Orpheus and Eurydice. In the myth Orpheus travels to the Underworld to save his wife but in the end she is trapped forever.

The movie follows two young lovers in an otherworldly marsh by an abandoned crude-oil carrier named "Moon Lake". They play a game about the Thracian singer Orpheus, who ascends from the Underworld, followed by his beloved mistress, Eurydice.

Another nameless couple – a lookalike of Orpheus and Eurydice - appear.

The trajectories of the two couples never cross.

In an elite cave school in the rocky Black Sea coast, a cliff dwelling community is taught survival in a barren moonscape in the wake of the catastrophe.

All of them live in an obsessive dream – to leave the Earth in a vessel, like Noah's Ark, before the explosion of the Sun in four billion years.

== Cast ==
- Yasna Bozhkova: Eurydice
- Vasil Chitanov: Orpheus
- Gloria Petkova: Girl in Love
- Simon Todorov: Boy in Love
- Michael Cohen: English Teacher
- Teodor Dobrev: Karl Marx Twins
- Ivaylo Dobrev: Karl Marx Twins
- Milena Kerefeyna-Zheleva: Clairvoyant
- Aurora Timeva: Clairvoyant's Pupil
- Ivan Ivanov: Oxygen Worker
- Dorothea Tabakova: Ancient Greek Teacher
- Boyan Manchev: Philosophy Teacher
- Vanya Kiritzova: Astrology Teacher
- Mariana Evlogieva: Esperanto Teacher
- Konstantin Aleksandrov: Marine Teacher
- Chorus "Sveta Troitza": Chorus
- Arabel Karajan: Jazz Band
- Rosen Zahariev: Jazz Band
- Aleksandar Evtimov: Jazz Band
- Georgi Donchev: Jazz Band

== Production ==
ULCC "Moon Lake"

The story was inspired by a real ship called "Moon Lake", which crashed off the shore of the Black Sea. The director Ivan Stanev spent a summer with the person who had been sent to dismantle the ship, filming daily. Some of the footage was later used in the film.

This ship became the inspiration for a group of loosely related works, which also included a poem called Moon Lake written in German and a theatre performance in Norway in 2004.

Moon Lake is part of Stanev's strategy of making interconnected theater performances, film projects and literary texts, that he has also used for other projects such as ″Villa dei Misteri″ (2003) and ″Luxor Las Vegas″ (2006).

Moon Lake was also inspired by the unique location where the movie was shot, the steep cliffs and caves in the Yailata National Archaeological Reserve, south of Kamen Bryag, on the Black Sea.

The script of the movie was only twelve pages long, and many of the scenes were improvised.

It only features non-professional actors, the majority of whom were studying art and languages, and the others were musicians, painters or anarchists. The cast also included a group of professional teachers, specialists in subjects ranging from Ancient Greek to astrophysics.

The languages spoken in Moon Lake include English, French, Russian, German, Spanish, Bulgarian, Ancient Greek, and Esperanto.

The film was produced independently from national film centers. It was funded by producer Donka Angelova.

It combines footage shot on 35 mm (all of the scenes including Orpheus and Eurydice), Super16mm (the scenes featuring the boy and girl in love), and HD with wide range of 35mm optics (all scenes shot in the caves).

"Moon Lake" was shot entirely during sunrise and/or sunset.

The postproduction was carried out by "The Post Republic" and done at Babelsberg Film Studio in Berlin using a complex color grading.

== Soundtrack ==
The soundtrack was composed by Sebastian Meissner. The film also features live music by Arabel von Karajan and Alarma Jazz Band, a string quartet performing "Der Tod und das Mädchen", the Orthodox choir "Sveta Troitza", and Romani music. The final sound design was provided by Matthias Schwab in the Babelsberg Studios, Berlin.

== Critical reception ==
ULCC "Moon Lake", Dismantled

The film received mostly positive reviews. Albena Stambolova wrote in Kultura "Although true, it is not enough to say that the film is beautiful. The film is very demanding of its spectators in a controlled manner, one that may put a strain on them. Words in different languages can be heard throughout the film – English, French, Greek, etc. Expressing both poetical and philosophical ideas, it is not enough to understand these words. But rather, they seem to have been let loose into the free space under the vault of the sky where they soar freely and occasionally return to those who uttered them. Distilled to the world's extremes, Moon Lake works with earth, water, sky (air), wood, and metal – it operates with the elements from which, according to the Chinese, the world was created. It is shot entirely outdoors – it is open to the upper and to the lower – and to remind you once again, in those lands that are inscribed into the memory of origin, in this case, Ivan Stanev's origin. But also the origin of all of us humans, from Ancient times to our present moment."

The movie's release was accompanied by the publication of a book of essays about Moon Lake by a group of distinguished Eastern European philosophers, poets and critics like Miglena Nikolchina, Boyan Manchev, Edvin Sugarev, Bogdan Bogdanov, Darin Tenev, Albena Stambolova, Dorothea Tabakova, Kamelia Spassova, Maria Kalinova, Rajna Markova, Todor. P. Todorov.

Miglena Nikolchina, the editor of the book, wrote

In the film Moon Lake, Orpheus functions as a cultural hero, as coextensive to civilization and as its principle. The film achieves this by representing the wanderings of an ancient and a future Orpheus, whose trajectories inscribe their mysterious figures on a landscape comprised of primordial silt, archaic ruins, modern waste, and moon scenery. Chronologically stratified and yet recognizably modern, this landscape reverberates as speech (from Plato to Eliot and Machado), as music (from the conch shell to electronic instruments), and as a diachronic object world (from the horse-drawn cart to the Jaguar). In it, living and dead languages merge; the gripping, almost inaudible call of whales pierces the squeaking of rusty oil pumps; a fortune-teller and an astrophysicist join forces in their prophecies... Moon Lake is a double film – not only because its plot is double; or because it looks both to the past and to the future; or because it is full of couples and twins. This is also the case because there is one film that flows before your eyes and another one that follows you. Moon Lake has to be viewed more than once not just because it is different at each viewing but because it incorporates its theme and its making into the viewing itself. This is a film that comes after itself, it leads itself the way Orpheus leads Eurydice: with all its sensuousness and although it rubs itself against our gaze like the lunar body of a dreamt-of mermaid, it takes place after an interval, after the withdrawal of the gaze, from behind your back, from the position of an invisible overtaking. I turn back to look – and it keeps coming.
