= Ivan Stanev =

Bulgarian writer and director (born 1959)

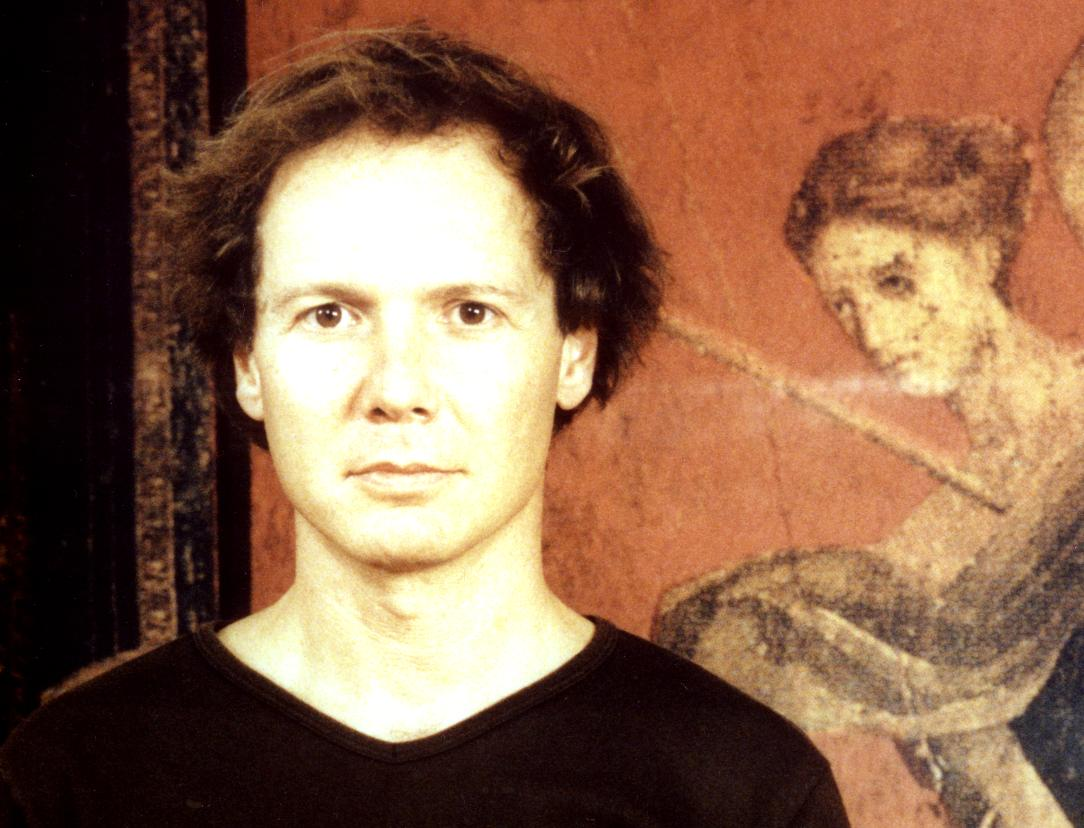
- Ivan Stanev photographed by André Rival
- Born: Varna, Bulgaria
- Occupations: Theatre, film director, author, scenographer, new media artist, producer
- Website: https://ivanstanev.com

Ivan Stanev (Bulgarian: Иван Станев, 29 June 1959 – 1 December 2023) was an author, theatre and film director, scenographer and new media artist, who had been living in Berlin since 1988, and more recently in Paris.

== Biography ==
Ivan Stanev was born in the city of Varna, Bulgaria. His mother, Donka Raikova, was a lawyer and poet and his father, Stanju Stanev, was an engineer and photographer. He enrolled into a German-language high school, while also studying intensively French, Russian and English.

He got his degree in Theatre Directing from the National Academy for Theatre and Film Arts in Sofia. While a student in the academy, he founded a clandestine avant-garde theatre group, which led to severe conflicts with censorship in Communist Bulgaria. Not allowed to work as a theatre director anymore, he went on to study philosophy at the Sofia University, and started to translate the works of Theodor Adorno and Heiner Muller, in the meantime writing plays, poems and essays, all to be published much later.

In 1988, he was invited to present his theatre production called The Wound Woyzeck at a theatre festival in West-Berlin. He decided not to return to Bulgaria and to live in exile instead. He began to write in German and to stage his own plays in Berlin.

Since 1999, he has also worked on several major Franco-German theatre productions. Due to his growing interest in visual arts, he directed and produced two experimental films: Villa Dei Misteri and Luxor Las Vegas. In 2009 he finished his first independent feature film, shot on 35 mm, called Moon Lake, produced by Donka Angelova.

He lived in Berlin and Paris and worked in both Germany and France.

He died on December 1, 2023.

== Writings ==
In Bulgarian

- The Exterminated Denizens (excerpts from the sketchbooks of a démodé modernist) – poetry, drama, theory: 1985–1987. Publishing house "Virga", Sofia 1994, (Bulgarian: Избитите обитатели (из тетрадките на един закъснял модернист) – поезия, драма, теория 1985–1987)

In German

- 1992 Lapsus Linguae, Autoren-Kollegium Berlin
- 2000 Postskriptum, a poem, Juliettes Literatursalon Berlin
- 2002 Villa Dei Misteri, Juliettes Literatursalon Berlin
- 2003 Luxor Las Vegas, Konkursbuch Verlag Berlin/Tübingen
- 2009 Moon Lake, a poem, Publishing house Altera
- 2017 Abrasax Asteroiden, a poem, Bleibende Steinzeit/Tumult/Sonderzahl Wien
- 2018 Place Fantôme, dramatic poem, T.INTE Berlin

In English

- 2023 Poems in Posthuman Akkadian

== Films ==
Films shot on video

- Villa dei misteri (2003)
- Luxor Las Vegas (2006)
- Le Bleu du Ciel (2016)
- Inge (2019)

Films shot on 35 mm

- Moon Lake (2009)

Web Television

- TTV – Totleben TV (2023)

== Installations ==
- Don Juan im Kumpelnest 3000 zu Berlin (2000)
- Hollywood Forever (2004)
- Place Fantôme (2018)

== New Media Art ==
- CHEZ TOTLEBEN | Phantom Art Apartment (2023)
- GOT | Garden of Totleben (2023)
- TO DESCA | Totleben´s Writing Desk (2023)

== Exhibitions ==
- ANIMA MUNDI – RITUALS | VENICE (2022)
- ANIMA MUNDI – CONSCIOUSNESS | VENICE (2022)
- ROME INTERNATIONAL ART FAIR | MEDINA ART GALLERY | ROME(2022)
- LONDON CONTEMPORARY | THE LINE CONTEMPORARY ART SPACE | LONDON(2022)
- MISS TOTO K. | SEVEN STAR GALLERY | BERLIN(2022)

== Selected Major Productions ==
- 1982 Wildwechsel (Deer Path) after Kroetz – banned performance
- 1984 The Love for Three Oranges by Ivan Stanev after Gozzi
- 1985, 1986 Alchimie de la douleur (The Alchemy of Sorrow) collage by Ivan Stanev after Chekhov, Wittgenstein, Baudelaire, Ionesco – banned performance
- 1987, 1988 Woyzeck. Die Wunde Woyzeck. Bildbeschreibung (The Wound Woyzeck) after Büchner / Müller, Theatre Sofia, Hebbel Theater Berlin
- 1989 Betrogen / Gestern an einem sonnigen Nachmittag (Betrayal/Yesterday on a Sunny Afternoon) after Harold Pinter / Heiner Müller, Studiotheater München
- 1990/91 Schuld und Bühne (Rhyme and Punishment) by Ivan Stanev, Hebbel Theater Berlin, Eurokaz Zagreb
- 1991 Hermaphroditus by Ivan Stanev, Hebbel Theater Berlin, Kampnagelfabrik Hamburg, Mickery Amsterdam, Theater der Welt Essen
- 1992 Brüderchen und Schwesterchen (Brother and Sister), by Ivan Stanev, Podewil Berlin
- 1995 Die Möwe (The Seagull) by Chekhov, Volksbühne Berlin
- 1998 Sprechen-Schweigen (Speak-Fall Silent) after Ionesco/Wittgenstein, Podewil Berlin
- 1998 Good night, ladies after Shakespeare/Müller, Künstlerhaus Bethanien Berlin
- 1999 Histoire de l'œil (Story of the Eye) by Georges Bataille, Théâtre de la Manufacture Nancy, Theatre Sofia
- 1999 Don Juan im Kumpelnest 3000 zu Berlin (Don Juan in Kumpelnest 3000 in Berlin), Sophiensaele Berlin
- 2000 Le bleu du ciel (The Blue of Noon) by Georges Bataille, Sophiensaele Berlin, Théâtre de Chartres, La rose des vents Lille, Théâtre Antoine Vitez Aix-en-Provence
- 2001 Villa Dei Misteri by Ivan Stanev, Sophiensaele Berlin, Théâtre de la Bastille Paris, Théâtre Antoine Vitez Aix-en-Provence, La rose des vents Lille, FFT Düsseldorf
- 2002 Luxor Las Vegas by Ivan Stanev, Sophiensaele Berlin
- 2004 Hollywood Forever by Ivan Stanev, Hebbel Theater Berlin, Le Maillon Strassburg, La rose des vents Lille, FFT Düsseldorf, Gessnerallee Zürich
- 2004 Moon Lake, after a poem by Ivan Stanev, Norwegian Theatre Academy Fredrikstad
- 2005 Digging Materials (Bulgarian: Изкопни материали) by Ivan Stanev after Platonov, Theater Sfumato, Sofia
- 2009, 2010 Mord im Burgtheater (Murder in Burgtheater) by Ivan Stanev, Volksbühne Berlin, Le Maillon Strassburg
- 2011 Rustschuk – Die gerettete Zunge (Rustschuk – The Saved Tongue) by Elias Canetti, Theater Osnabrück
- 2013 Bitte bei TOTLEBEN klingeln – written and directed by Ivan Stanev, Wonderloch Kellerland / Berlin
- 2015 TTV. Live from Todessa – Totleben TV
- 2017 Scherzo di Follia – written and directed by Ivan Stanev, Kopfgeldjäger, Berlin
- 2018 Place Fantôme – written and directed by Ivan Stanev, Hauptstadtkulturfonds, Berlin

== Grants and awards ==
- VILLA DEI MISTERI | Special Ivan Stanev | FilmFest München (2003)
- VILLA DEI MISTERI | Videoart Award | AsoloArtFilmFestival, Italy(2005)
- WEIL | Simone Weil | Work in Progress | GVL, Neustart Kultur (2022)
- LA TÊTE | Jeanne Hébuterne | Work in Progress | GVL, Neustart Kultur (2022)
- KAMIKAZE KARAOKE | Work in Progress | Akademie der Künste, Berlin (2022)
- NINURTA´S EXPLOITS | Poems in Posthuman Akkadian | Work in Progress | Fonds Darstellende Künste (2022)
- MISS TOTO K. | Toto Koopman | Work in Progress | Fonds Darstellende Künste (2022)
