= Growing Up Straight (Wyden and Wyden book) =

1968 book by Peter and Barbara Wyden

Growing Up Straight: What Every Thoughtful Parent Should Know About Homosexuality
- Cover
- Authors: Peter and Barbara Wyden
- Language: English
- Subjects: Homosexuality; Parenting
- Publisher: Stein and Day
- Publication date: 1968
- Publication place: United States
- Media type: Print (Hardcover and Paperback)
- Pages: 265
- ISBN: 978-0812810721

Growing Up Straight: What Every Thoughtful Parent Should Know About Homosexuality is a 1968 guide for parents, by Peter and Barbara Wyden, which he claims can prevent their children from becoming homosexual. Stanley Yolles, head of the National Institute of Mental Health, wrote an introduction.

== Reception ==
Growing Up Straight received a negative review from James Colton in Tangents. Colton ridiculed the Wydens' advice on how to prevent homosexuality, and accused them of making contradictory and inconsistent claims and of citing experts such as Evelyn Hooker and Judd Marmor only when it served their purposes to do so.

The gay rights activist Dennis Altman compared Growing Up Straight to the journalist and social critic Vance Packard's The Sexual Wilderness, Patricia Sexton's The Feminized Male, and Hendrik Ruitenbeek's The Male Myth. He described them as part of a trend to attack the collapse of American masculinity and femininity and connect it to "an alleged growth in homosexuality." He wrote that the book, "makes very explicit the connection between the fear of a declining sex role dichotomy and increased homosexuality; mothers and fathers are counseled to act out all those she-woman and he-man stereotypes as a model for their growing children."

The neuroscientist Simon LeVay described Growing Up Straight as an example of psychoanalytic ideas influencing general attitudes toward homosexuality. The reparative therapist Joseph Nicolosi and Linda Ames Nicolosi stated that Growing Up Straight has been seen as a classic.
