= Peter H. Wyden =

American journalist

- Born: Peter Weidenreich; October 2, 1923; Berlin, Germany
- Died: June 27, 1998 (aged 74); Danbury, Connecticut, U.S.
- Education: City College of New York
- Occupation: Journalist
- Spouse: 3
- Children: 2, including Ron Wyden
- Parent(s): Erich Weidenreich; Helen Silberstein
- Relatives: Franz Weidenreich (paternal uncle)

Peter H. Wyden (October 2, 1923 – June 27, 1998) was an American journalist and historian.

== Early life ==
Wyden was born Peter Weidenreich, in Berlin to a Jewish family. His mother, Helen (née Silberstein), was a concert singer, and his father, Erich Weidenreich, was a businessman. Franz Weidenreich, German anatomist and physical anthropologist, was one of his uncles.

Wyden attended the Goldschmidt School until he left Nazi Germany for the United States in 1937. After studying at City College of New York, he served with the U.S. Army's Psychological Warfare Division in Europe during World War II. His training at Camp Ritchie places him among the ranks of the Ritchie Boys, a group of Military Intelligence Officers who used their language skills to obtain intel in Europe. In 2021, Peter's son Ron Wyden, a U.S. Senator, was instrumental in creating a senate resolution recognizing the Ritchie Boys for their efforts.

== Career ==
After the war, Wyden began a career in journalism, during which he worked as a reporter for The Wichita Eagle, a feature writer for the St. Louis Post-Dispatch, Washington correspondent for Newsweek magazine, a contributing editor for The Saturday Evening Post in Chicago and San Francisco, articles editor for McCall's, and executive editor for Ladies' Home Journal.

Wyden authored or coauthored nine books, and numerous articles that appeared in major magazines. In 1969, he co-authored with his wife a book on homosexuality entitled Growing Up Straight; the book summed up research on the topic, which suggested homosexuality could be prevented with a close paternal relationship in childhood. His last book, published in 1998, was about schizophrenia; it was based on his personal experience as his son Jeff suffered from the mental disorder.

In 1970, Wyden became a book publisher in New York City and Ridgefield, Connecticut.

== Personal life and death ==
Wyden was married three times. He had two sons, including Ron Wyden, who became a United States senator. He died on June 27, 1998, in Danbury, Connecticut.

== Books ==
- Suburbia's Coddled Kids. 1962. New Jersey: Doubleday & Company, Inc.
- The Overweight Society. 1965. New York: Pocket Books.
- Wyden, Peter; Wyden, Barbara (1969). Growing Up Straight: What Every Thoughtful Parent Should Know about Homosexuality. New York: Stein and Day. OCLC 976970206.
- Bay of Pigs – The Untold Story. 1979. New York: Simon and Schuster. ISBN 0-671-24006-4 ISBN 0224017543 ISBN 978-0-671-24006-6
- The Passionate War: The Narrative History of the Spanish Civil War. 1983. New York: Simon and Schuster. 1983 ISBN 0-671-25330-1
- Day One: Before Hiroshima and After. 1985. New York: Simon and Schuster. 1984 ISBN 0-671-46142-7
- Stella: One Woman's True Tale of Evil, Betrayal, and Survival in Hitler's Germany. Anchor Books, 1993. ISBN 978-0385471794
- Wall: The Inside Story of Divided Berlin. 1989. Simon and Schuster. ISBN 0-671-55510-3
- Wyden, Peter H. (1998). Conquering Schizophrenia: A Father, His Son and a Medical Breakthrough. New York: Knopf. ISBN 9780679446712. OCLC 37560191.
