= Werner Scharff =

German-Jewish resistance member

- Born: 16 August 1912; Posen, Province of Posen German Empire (Poznań, Poland)
- Died: 16 March 1945 (aged 32); Sachsenhausen concentration camp, Nazi Germany
- Citizenship: Germany
- Occupations: Electrician, resistance member

Werner Scharff (August 16, 1912 – March 16, 1945) was a German Jewish resistance activist against the Nazi regime. He was executed in Sachsenhausen concentration camp because of his activities in the "Community for Peace and Development" (German: "Gemeinschaft für Frieden und Aufbau"), which he founded together with Hans Winkler in Luckenwalde.

== Life ==
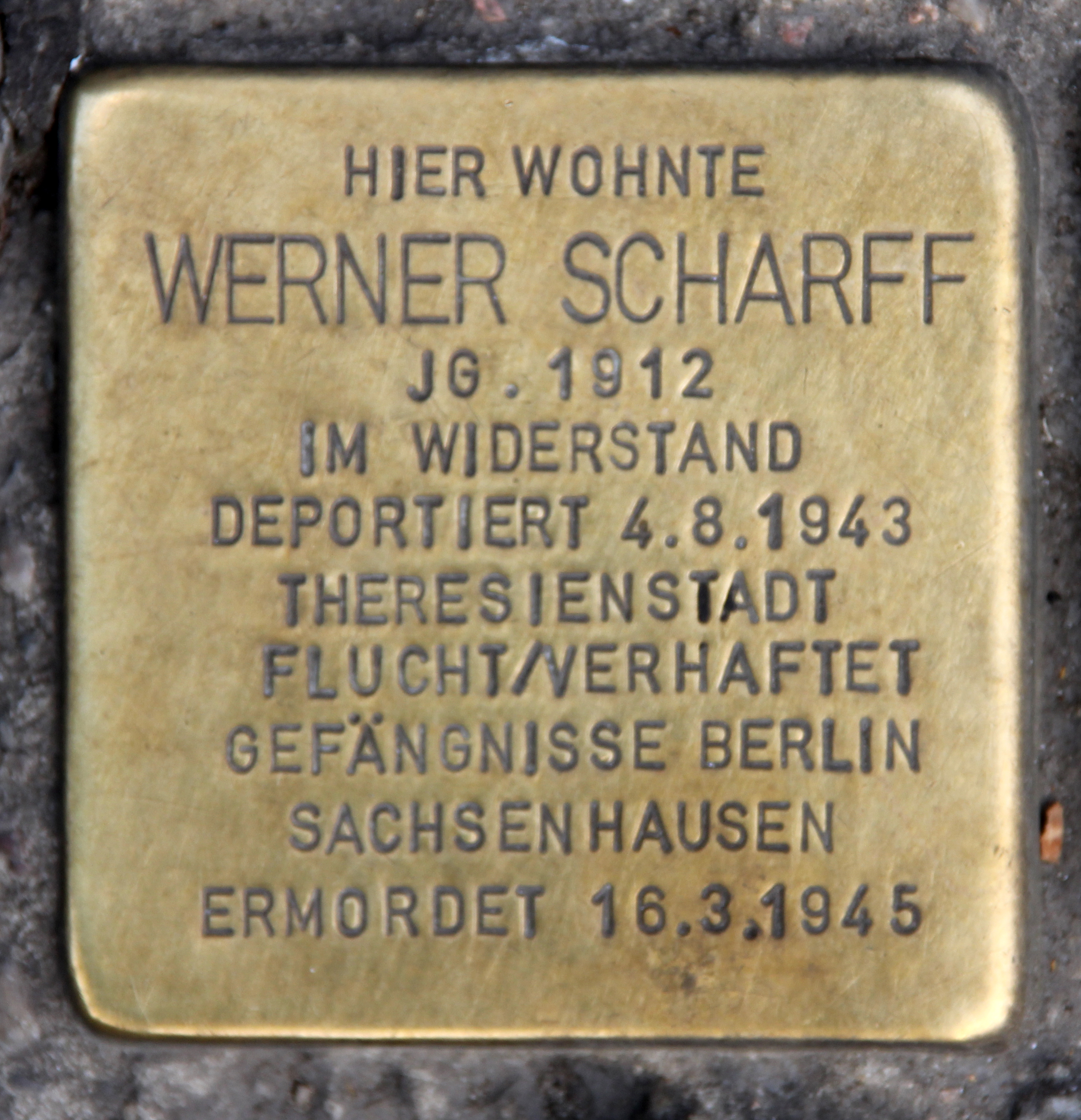
Stone embedded in front of Werner's home in Berlin

Werner Scharff was born into a Jewish family in Posen in 1912. The family moved to Berlin in 1918. After the early death of his father in 1929, Scharff took up an apprenticeship as an electritician to be able to take care of his mother and his two younger siblings. In 1938, he married Gertrud Weissman. A planned emigration of the Jewish couple failed. In 1941, Scharff started to work as an electrician in the synagogue Levetzowstraße in Berlin-Moabit, which was misused as a deportation site from 1942 by the SS. This provided Scharff with a deep insight into the cruelty of the Nazis and the bitter fate of their victims. As the electrician, Scharff was allowed to move freely within the deportation site and to leave it at any time. He used this to smuggle messages, food and clothes from the relatives of the detained into the deportation site on a large scale. Thanks to the occupation of his new girlfriend Fancia Grün, who worked as a secretary in the registration office of the Jewish Community and who was responsible for writing deportation lists, he was also able to warn many of his friends and acquaintances from imminent deportations.

== Deportation and escape ==
When the other community members were deported in the summer of 1943, Scharff fled to the underground on June 10, 1943. Four weeks later, on July 14, the Gestapo found him and deported him to the Theresienstadt Ghetto. He did not stay long however and escaped on September 7 together with Fancia Grün. His destination was the address of resistance member Hans Winkler, which had been recommended to him in Theresienstadt as a possible hideout in Berlin.

== Active resistance and execution ==
Werner Scharff was full of ideas how to actively encourage other citizens to passive resistance against the Nazis, but he needed people to help him. When Winkler heard of Scharff's plans, he was instantly willing to participate. Together with Günter Samuel and Erich Schwarz, Winkler had already been operating a loose resistance group since before the outbreak of the war to help saving Jews from deportation. The resistance group became later known as the "Community for Peace and Development" (German: "Gemeinschaft für Frieden und Aufbau").

His occupation at the district court gave Winkler the opportunity to organise passports and to issue death certificates of Jews who had been hidden at his and his friends' places. He also had many friends and acquaintances who were willing to provide food stamps and accommodation. Scharff gradually became the head of the organisation which mainly consisted of friends and acquaintances of Scharff and Winkler, of opponents of the Nazi regime, and other like-minded citizens of Berlin-Wedding, Berlin-Mitte, and Berlin-Kreuzberg. Scharff developed new ideas how to distribute chain mails and opposition leaflets and how to recruit new supporters. Together with Winkler he organised the large-scale distribution of their leaflets, in which they appealed to independent thinking, to resistance and to putting an end to the war. Furthermore, they provided shelter to 6–10 persecuted Jews at any time. Scharff and Winkler even contacted inhabitants of the prisoner of war camp Stalag III-A in Luckenwalde, most likely with the goal to ultimately gain access to military arsenal. It was Scharff's dream to free the last Jews that were imprisoned in the prison and detention camp at the Jewish hospital in Berlin.

There were also active plans to kill the infamous Jew "catcher" and Nazi collaborator Stella Goldschlag but none of the plans came into fruition. A plan to poison her coffee was abandoned, so also was a plan to have her dentist poison her during an appointment and another one where Goldschlag and her partner Rolf Isaaksohn would be lured to an address by a rumor of Jews in hiding living there and then kill the pair.

GFA instead sent Goldschlag a fake death sentence written on official court document paper and informed her that if she was seen on the streets [after the war] by one of their agents she would be killed instantly. Even if the threat was only for intimidation it was seen as a valid one and Goldschlag's superior pulled her and the other members of the Search Service from the streets for two weeks and later issued them with pistols for protection.

Many, most of all the wife of Hans Winkler, thought that the organisation was acting too recklessly. A member of the group, Hilde Bromberg, was indeed arrested in April 1944 after a denunciation by the widow of the executed bookseller August Bonneß, Jr. (1890-1944). Although Bromberg did not reveal the other group members and even managed to lead the Gestapo astray, they eventually tracked down the group and arrested Werner Scharff on October 14, 1944. Scharff was brought to the prison at Alexanderplatz and brutally interrogated. Shortly thereafter, Winkler and many other members of the organisation were arrested as well.

By the end of 1944, Scharff was transferred to Sachsenhausen concentration camp. The SS executed him on March 16, 1945. Fancia Grün was executed in the concentration camp as well. Many other members of the community only survived thanks to the end of the war — otherwise they would have faced certain death.
