= Helene Jacobs =

German Resistance fighter

- Helene Jacobs
- Born: 25 February 1906; Schneidemühl
- Died: 13 August 1993 (aged 87); Berlin
- Occupations: Member of the Confessing Church, German Resistance activist
- Known for: Rescuing Jews during the Holocaust, Righteous Among the Nations

Helene Jacobs (German: [heˈleː.nə ˈja.kɔps]; 25 February 1906, Schneidemühl – 13 August 1993, Berlin) was a member of the Confessing Church and of the German Resistance against National Socialism.

== Life ==
Jacobs was the secretary to a Jewish patent attorney and (from 1934 onwards) a member of the Confessing Church. She joined a group centred on the lawyer Franz Herbert Kaufmann which, from 1940 onwards, hid Jews fleeing Nazi persecution and helped them to escape from Germany. Jacobs hid some Jews in her own house out of a Christian-Socialist motivation, until she was denounced in 1943 and subsequently convicted to two and a half years' imprisonment in a zuchthaus or penitentiary.

Jacobs was a member of the Society for Christian-Jewish Cooperation since its foundation in 1949 and was honoured by Yad Vashem as Righteous Among the Nations. She died in 1993 and was buried at the Waldfriedhof Dahlem, where she was given a memorial in 2004.

== Quotation ==
"I had nothing to do with illegality. My world was falling apart, and I wanted to defend it. On 30 January 1933, as Hitler became Reich-chancellor, I lost my homeland. The antisemitic Nuremberg Laws (1935), that arbitrarily excluded a section of the population from citizenship, especially got under my skin. I wanted to help these hounded people." (Note: Original German: Mit Illegalität hatte ich nichts zu tun. Meine Welt ging kaputt, die wollte ich verteidigen. Ich hatte am 30. Januar 1933, als Hitler Reichskanzler wurde, mein Vaterland verloren. Besonders die antisemitischen Nürnberger Gesetze (1935), die einen Teil der Bevölkerung willkürlich aus der Gemeinschaft ausschlossen, gingen mir unter die Haut. Diesen verfolgten Menschen wollte ich helfen.)

== Plaque ==
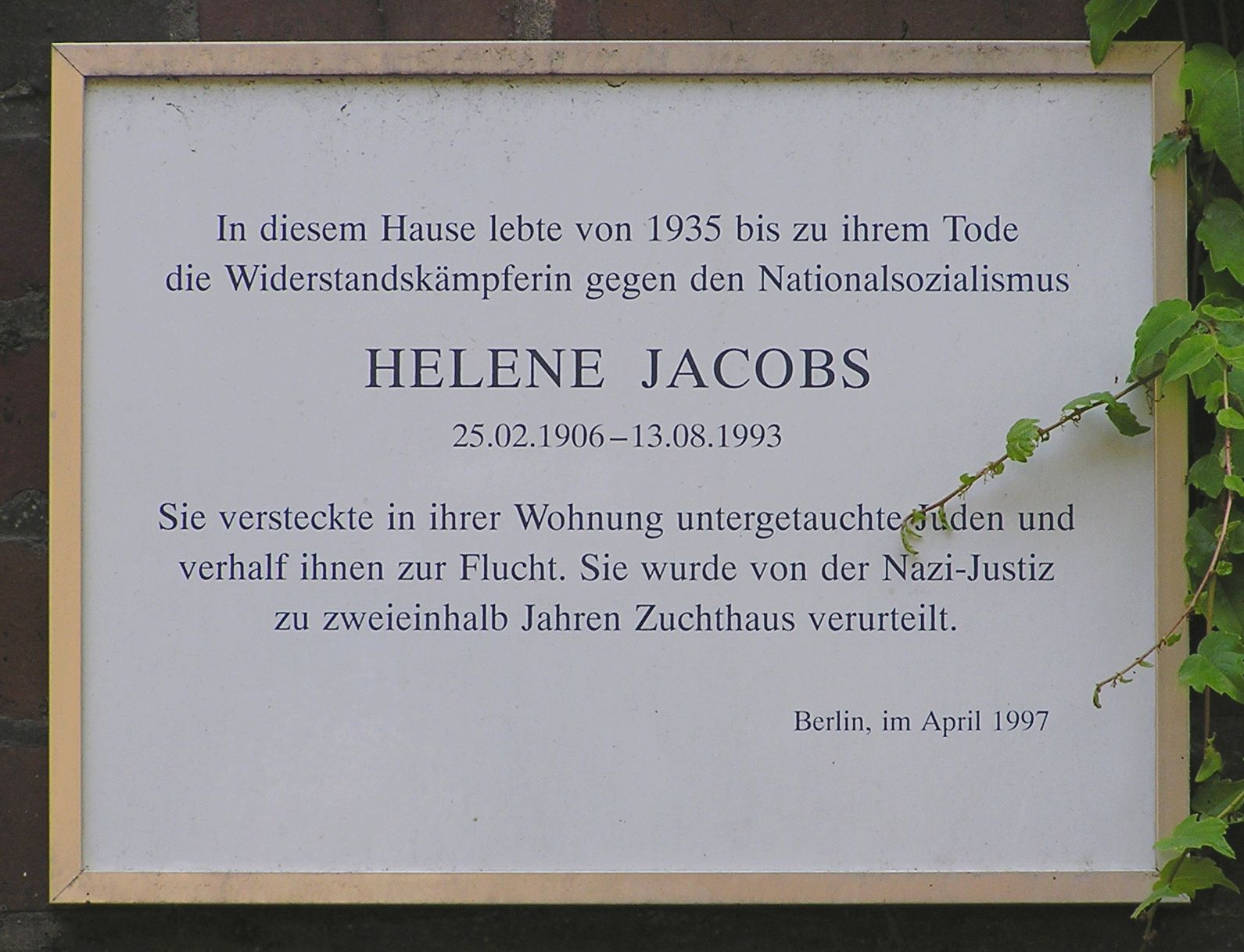
Plaque on Haus Bonner Straße 2 in Berlin-Wilmersdorf

The inscription on the plaque on Bonner Straße 2 in the Künstlerkolonie Wilmersdorf translates as:

"From 1935 until her death, in this house lived the resistor against Nazism Helene Jacobs, 15/2/1906 to 13/8/1993. She hid unprotected Jews in her home and helped them to escape. The Nazi courts sentenced her to 2.5 years imprisonment. Berlin, April 1997." (Note: Original German: In diesem Hause lebte von 1935 bis zu ihrem Tode die Widerstandskämpferin gegen den Nationalsozialismus Helene Jacobs 15.02.1906 - 13.08.1993 Sie versteckte in ihrer Wohnung untergetauchte Juden und verhalf ihnen zur Flucht. Sie wurde von der Nazi-Justiz zu zweieinhalb Jahren Zuchthaus verurteilt. Berlin, im April 1997)

== Bibliography ==
- Beate Kosmala: Zivilcourage in extremer Situation: Retterinnen und Retter von Juden im „Dritten Reich“ (1941–1945). In: Gerd Meyer, Ulrich Dovermann, Siegfried Frech, Günther Gugel (Hrsg.): Zivilcourage lernen: Analysen – Modelle – Arbeitshilfen. Bundeszentrale für politische Bildung, Bonn 2004, S. 106-115, hier: S. 110. Online resource ISBN 3-89331-537-3
- Katrin Rudolph: Hilfe beim Sprung ins Nichts: Franz Kaufmann und die Rettung von Juden und „nichtarischen“ Christen. Berlin: Metropol 2005. ISBN 3-936411-77-8
- Ulrich Werner Grimm: Die Berliner Gesellschaft für Christlich-Jüdische Zusammenarbeit. Geschichte(n) im Spiegel ihrer Quellen. In: Gesellschaft für Christlich-Jüdische Zusammenarbeit in Berlin e.V. (Hrsg.): Im Gespräch. 50 Jahre Gesellschaft für Christlich-Jüdische Zusammenarbeit in Berlin e.V. - Eine Festschrift, Konzeption/Redaktion: Ulrich Werner Grimm, Berlin 1999.
