= Juliettes Literatursalon =

Bookshop in Berlin, Germany

Juliette's Literature Salon was a bookshop in Berlin, Germany, founded by author and performance artist Hartmut Fischer. In addition to the bookshop, it included a publishing house and an attached gallery. Between 1997 and 2003, the bookshop hosted events and served as a meeting place for creative artists and culture aficionados. The salon owes its name to the character of the same name in the novel Juliette by the Marquis de Sade, the Enlightenment ideas of Voltaire, and the Berlin salon hosts Rahel Varnhagen and Henriette Herz.

== Background ==
The salon was preceded by Juliette's Literary Cafe in Tübingen, which was founded in 1987 by Fischer and Ekkehart Opitz. Fischer organized numerous literary performances and readings with Yoko Tawada, Claudia Gehrke, Charlotte von Mahlsdorf, Erich Maas, Peter Wawerzinek and others. Juliette's Literary Cafe also created a comprehensive retrospective of the work of the author Hubert Fichte along with Tahar Ben Jelloun (the first Prix Goncourt winner from the Maghreb), Hans Mayer, Leonore Mau, as well as Hartmut Böhme, Napoleon Seyfarth and others.

In 1992, Fischer and Spitz published As Buch Diletata (The Book Diletata), a homage to the club in Tübingen and to the birthplace of DADA, the Cabaret Voltaire in Zürich. Together with the musicians Marcie Strojny and Jacek Ruszkiewicz from Kraków, Fischer and Opitz toured from 1992 to 2000, staging their theater performance Teakettle (Chained Soul) at international theatre festivals such as the Krakowskie Reminiscencje Teatralne, the Edinburgh Fringe Festival and the audio-art-festival in Kraków.

== Juliette’s Literature Salon, Berlin ==
From 1997 to 2003, Fischer ran Juliette's Literature Salon in Berlin. It was also a bookshop, publishing house and gallery. Hosting notable events, the salon was a meeting place for creative artists and culture aficionados. In 1998, Peer Martina recited the newly translated essays of Michel de Montaigne continuously for nine days and nights.

By May 1999, the Text Reading Machine — a reading marathon that extended over several years — was staged in Juliette's Literature Salon. Numerous writers, theorists, artists and musicians read and consecutively interpreted the 4,000-page novel Justine and Juliette by the Marquis de Sade in its entirety, which was first published in German by Matthes & Seitz in 10 volumes. Among them were Blixa Bargeld, Durs Grünbein, Katharina Thalbach, Hermann Treusch, Thomas Macho, Gerburg Treusch-Dieter, Martin Wuttke, Harry Hass, Andreas L. Hofbauer, Kang Moon-suk with Uwe Mengel, Heinrich Dubel, Peer Martiny, Ben Becker, Julia Regehr, Peter Brasch, Olaf Nicolai and Eshu, Michael Farin, Angela Winkler and Thomas Brasch, Thomas Kapielski, Lauren Newton with Koho Mori-Newton and Hendrik Rohlf, Friedrich Kittler, Miron Zownir, Thea Dorn, MiJuliette’schael Pfister, Ambros Waibel, Stefan Hufschmidt, Katharina Franck, Andrea Jeremiah and Harald Koch, Ulrike Haage, Thomas Thieme, Cora Chilcott, Anna Stieblich and Henry Meyer, Franca Kastein Ferrera Alves, Rosa von Praunheim, Slavoj Žižek, Richard Shusterman, Jack Sergeant, Susan Neiman, Y. Michal Bodemann, Pierre Bourgeade, Pavel Kohout and numerous other performers.

In 1999, Peter Brasch lived and worked in Juliette's Literature Salon for several weeks. Thomas Brasch was planning to publish his last, several–thousand-page prose work Die Liebe und ihr Gegenteil (Love and its opposite) along with Hartmut Fischer and the publishing house. Thomas Wild prepared a first volume of poems for printing. However, the joint edition could not be continued due to the passing of Brasch in 2001. Since then, the Brunke-Konvolut remains unpublished in the archive of the Academy of Arts in Berlin.

In 2005, the video installation and reading LeseFuge – Thomas Brasch. Die Liebe und ihr Gegenteil oder Mädchenmörder Brunke was initiated on the basis of the Brunke-Konvolut in the Jewish Museum, Berlin, with Blixa Bargeld, Marion Brasch, Herbert Fritsch, Lars Rudolph, Otto Sander, Anna Thalbach and Angela Winkler.

== Juliette’s literature webpage ==
Since 2010, created in collaboration with Eckhard Hammel, the online installation of Juliette's Literature webpage (Juliette's literature webpage) documents the events of Juliette's Literary Café and Juliette's Literature Salon.

== Publications ==
- Hartmut Fischer, "Lob des Diffusen", konkursbuch 50, konkursbuchverlag Claudia Gehrke, Tübingen 2012, ISBN 978-3-88769-250-6
- Hartmut Fischer, "Schöne Geister", in: Text+Kritik, no. 194 Thomas Brasch, 2012, ISBN 978-3-86916-168-6
- Hartmut Fischer, "Poem 52° 31' N, 13° 24' O", in: Jennifer Shryane, Blixa Bargeld and Einstürzende Neubauten: German Experimental Music, 'Evading do-re-mi', Ashgate UK, 2011, ISBN 978-1-4094-2156-6
- Hartmut Fischer, "Theaterperipherien", konkursbuch 35, konkursbuchverlag Claudia Gehrke, Tübingen 2001, ISBN 9783887692353
- Ivan Stanev, Ivan Stanev Villa dei misteri, Verlag Juliette's Literature Salon, Berlin, 2001, ISBN 3932955021
- Ivan Stanev, Ivan Stanev Postskriptum, Verlag Juliette's Literature Salon, Berlin, 2000, ISBN 978-3-932955-00-6
- Thomas Brasch, "Meine Lieblingsbuchhandlung", in: "Waschmaschine oder lieber Thomas Mann? Prominente und ihre Buchhändler", Die Welt, 11 December 1999
- Cornelia Saxe, Das gesellige Canape. Renaissance der Berliner Salons, Ullstein Verlag, Berlin, 1999, ISBN 978-3-88679-331-0
- Blixa Bargeld, Blixa Bargeld – serialbathroomdummyrun, Verlag Juliette's Literature Salon, Berlin, 1997, 2nd revised edition 1998, ISBN 3-932955-97-8
- Opitz, Ekkehart; Fischer, Hartmut (ed.): Das Buch Diletata mit Texten aus dem BiHaDaHai und der Fahrt nach Kattowitz, ISBN 9783884661338
