= Cioma Schönhaus =

German graphic designer (1922–2015)

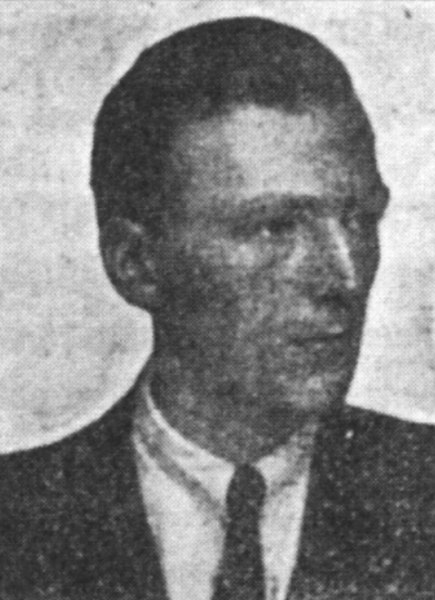
- Born: 28 September 1922; Berlin, Free State of Prussia, Weimar Republic
- Died: 22 September 2015 (aged 92); Biel-Benken, Basel-Landschaft, Switzerland

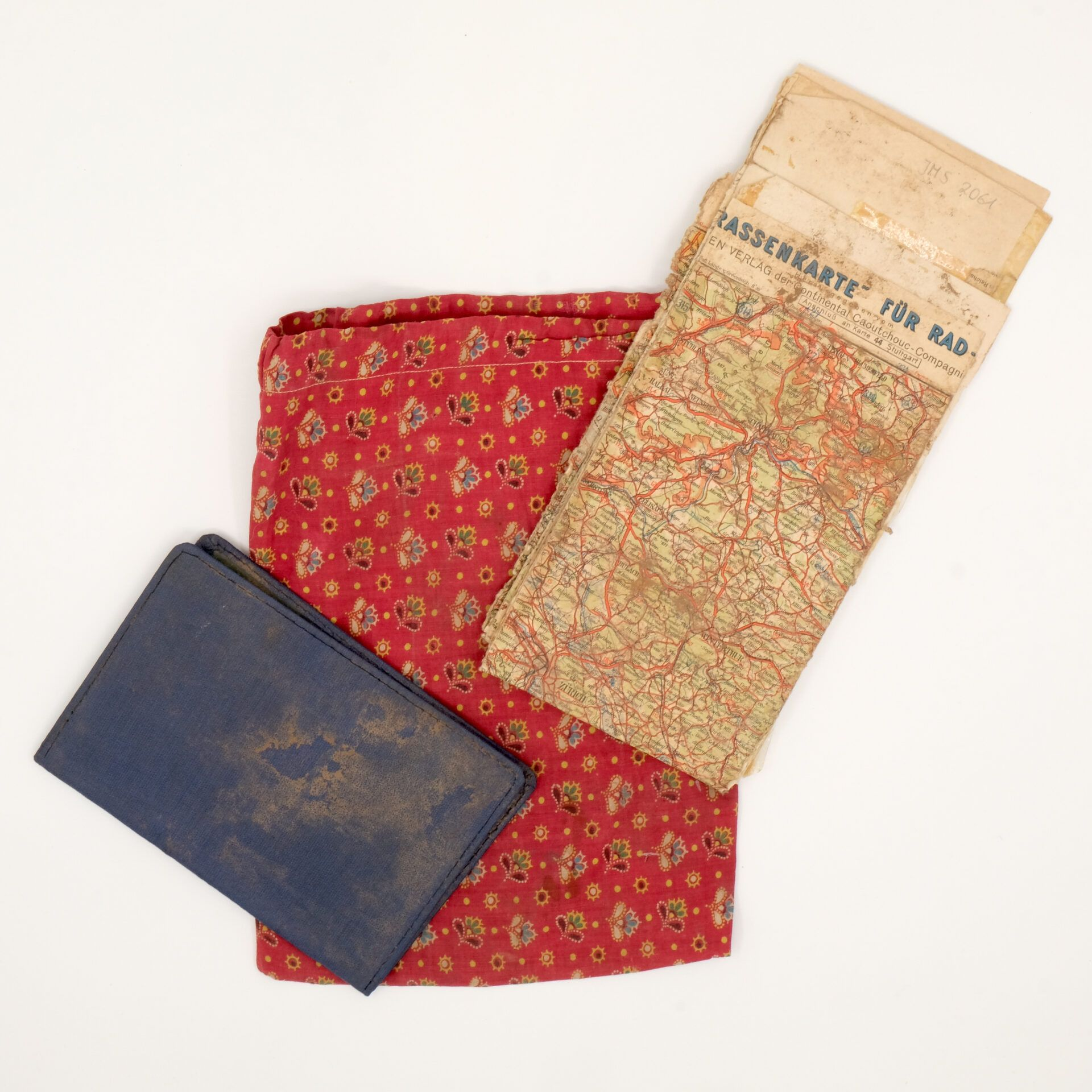
Objects used during Cioma Schönhaus’ escape: road map, document case, and the chest pouch in which they were kept, now in the collection of the Jewish Museum of Switzerland.

Samson "Cioma" Schönhaus (28 September 1922 – 22 September 2015) was a German graphic artist and writer who lived as a Jew in hiding in Berlin during World War II. He forged hundreds of identity documents to help other Jews survive during this time. He worked closely with members of the Confessing Church, including Franz Kaufmann and Helene Jacobs. He ultimately escaped from Berlin to Switzerland by bicycle in 1943, where he remained until his death. For the escape, he used a military identity card that he had forged himself.

His memoir, "The Forger," was published by Granta Books in 2007, translated from the German original (Der Passfälscher, published 2004). The feature film Der Passfälscher (The Passport Forger) from 2022 is also dedicated to his life; Schönhaus is portrayed here by Louis Hofmann.

Schönhaus was interviewed for the docudrama The Invisibles that was released after his death in 2017.

== Biography ==
Schönhaus was born to Belarusian Jewish parents Boris (Beer) Schönhaus and Fanja (Feiga) Bermann. Both had fled their home in Minsk following the Russian Revolution, with Boris having deserted the Red Army to elope with his future wife. The family briefly moved to Mandatory Palestine between 1926 and 1927, living in Haifa and Rishon LeZion before returning to Germany after Schönhaus became ill and could not receive adequate treatment. Schönhaus was raised in Berlin's Scheunenviertel, where his father ran a mineral water factory. The company was successful and distributed to many restaurants in and around Berlin, later suffering economically in the 1930s due to Nazi boycotts of Jewish businesses. In 1935, new policies under the Nazi government forced Schönhaus to change from Realschule to a Jewish-only Mittelschule.

In 1938, the water company and its equipment was forcibly sold under the Nazi government as part of Aryanization, also requiring his father to pay 30,000 ℛ︁ℳ︁ as Judenvermögensabgabe. The same year, Schönhaus was accepted into a private art school, but expelled due to racial laws after two semesters, and had to drop his studies in graphic design altogether when he was conscripted into forced labour service. In 1941, Allied bombing damaged the apartment building Schönhaus lived in with his parents and although their living quarters were undamaged, they were forced to vacate the premises in order for the German tenants whose flats were destroyed to move in. Schönhaus and his parents thus had to live with his uncle Meier Bermann and his wife Sophie.

Schönhaus avoided deportation since his work at an armament production was deemed essential, but both his parents were arrested by Gestapo in 1941 and sent to extermination camps. Schönhaus believed until the end of World War II that they were interned at Theresienstadt, but in reality, both were transported to occupied Poland and murdered in Majdanek and Sobibor in summer 1942. His uncle and aunt were killed in Auschwitz and his maternal grandmother died in Theresienstadt.

Following the disappearance of his parents, Schönhaus went into hiding in Berlin-Moabit and worked with the German resistance movement, receiving food stamps in return for forging documents. During this time, he lived under the false names "Günther Rogoff“, "Peter Schönhausen" and "Peter Petrow". When his two Jewish compatriots were exposed through tip-offs by Nazi collaborator Stella Goldschlag, Schönhaus fled Germany disguised as a Wehrmacht soldier. He was able to cross into Switzerland with a fake furlough document via Öhningen.

Schönhaus was granted a scholarship at Schule für Gestaltung Basel by Karl Barth, professionally working as a graphic designer after graduation. He got married and had four sons, two of whom became Klezmer musicians.
