= Franz Kaufmann =

German jurist and member of Nazi resistance movement (1886-1944)

Franz Kaufmann

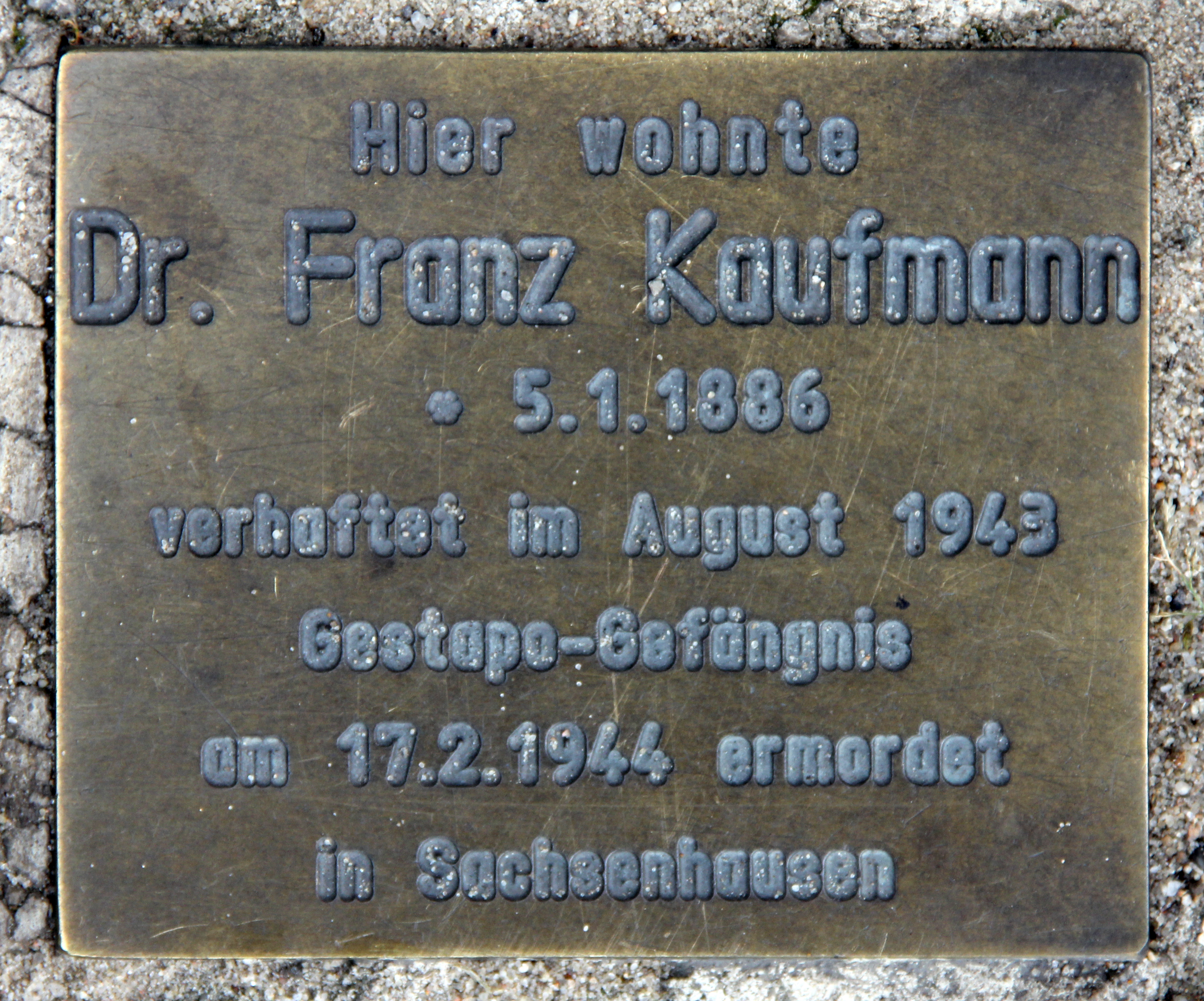
Memorial to Kaufmann at Kurfürstendamm 125, Berlin Translation: "Franz Kaufmann lived here, [born] 5.1.1886, Arrested in August 1943, Gestapo Prison, Murdered 17.2.1944 Sachsenhausen"

Franz Kaufmann (5 January 1886 – 17 February 1944) was a German jurist murdered in the Holocaust. His role helping underground Jews survive in hiding in Berlin and his execution are documented in The Forger, the memoirs of Cioma Schönhaus.

== Biography ==
Kaufmann was born to Jewish parents on 5 January 1886 and baptized a Protestant. He served in the first World War in the 10th Bavarian Field Artillery Regiment receiving, among other medals, the Iron Cross. After being wounded he was discharged from the army in 1918 as a reserve lieutenant. He obtained a doctorate in law and political science, and in 1922 was appointed to a specialist post in government finances in the Prussian ministry of the interior. He later became chief secretary of the Reich Public Accounts Office, in the finance ministry.

In 1936, because of his Jewish origins, he was dismissed from his post as chief secretary. When World War II broke out in 1939, he volunteered for the Red Cross but was refused, again due to his Jewish origins. He continued to enjoy privileged status due his then so-called racially mixed marriage to an Aryan-classified woman and because he brought up his daughter as a Christian.

Kaufmann joined a bible study group with The Confessing Church at Berlin-Dahlem in 1940, and—with other members of the church—began to supply post-office identity cards to on-the-run Jews. Ultimately he headed an underground group that created and supplied all manner of fake documents to underground Jews, including certificates of Aryan descent, driving licenses, and food ration cards. These documents were essential to the survival of many Berlin Jews.

He was arrested in August 1943. No charges were laid against him, since as a Jew in Nazi Germany he was subject not to German law but to police power. On 17 February 1944 he was taken to Sachsenhausen concentration camp and shot.
