= Values scale =

Type of psychological inventory

Values scales are psychological inventories used to determine the values that people endorse in their lives. They facilitate the understanding of both work and general values that individuals uphold. In addition, they assess the importance of each value in people's lives and how the individual strives toward fulfillment through work and other life roles, such as parenting. Most scales have been normalized and can therefore be used cross-culturally for vocational, marketing, and counseling purposes, yielding unbiased results. Psychologists, political scientists, economists, and others interested in defining values, use values scales to determine what people value, and to evaluate the ultimate function or purpose of values.

== Development ==
Values scales were first developed by an international group of psychologists whose goal was to create a unique self-report instrument that measured intrinsic and extrinsic values for use in the lab and in the clinic. The psychologists called their project the Work Importance Study (WIS). The original values scale measured the following values, listed in alphabetical order: ability utilization, achievement, advancement, aesthetics, altruism, authority, autonomy, creativity, cultural identity, economic rewards, economic security, life style, personal development, physical activity, physical prowess, prestige, risk, social interaction, social relations, variety, and working conditions. Some of the listed values were intended to be inter-related, but conceptually differentiable.

Since the original Work Importance Study, several scientists have supplemented the study by creating their own scale or by deriving and improving the original format. Theorists and psychologists often study values, values scales, and the field surrounding values, otherwise known as axiology. New studies have even been published recently, updating the work in the field. Dr. Eda Gurel-Atay published an article in the Journal of Advertising Research in March 2010, providing a glimpse into how social values have changed between 1976 and 2007. The paper explained how “self-respect” has been on the upswing, while “a sense of belonging” has become less important to individuals.

=== Rokeach ===
According to social psychologist Milton Rokeach, human values are defined as “core conceptions of the desirable within every individual and society. They serve as standards or criteria to guide not only action but also judgment, choice, attitude, evaluation, argument, exhortation, rationalization, and…attribution of causality.” In his 1973 publication, Rokeach also stated that the consequences of human values would be manifested in all phenomena that social scientists might consider worth investigating. In order for any type of research to be successful, regardless of the field of study, people's underlying values needed to be understood. To allow for this, Rokeach created the Rokeach Value Survey (RVS), which has been in use for more than 30 years. It provides a theoretical perspective on the nature of values in a cognitive framework and consists of two sets of values – 18 instrumental and 18 terminal. Instrumental values are beliefs or conceptions about desirable modes of behavior that are instrumental to the attainment of desirable end points, such as honesty, responsibility, and capability. Terminal values are beliefs or conceptions about ultimate goals of existence that are worth surviving for, such as happiness, self-respect, and freedom. The value survey asks subjects to rank the values in order of importance to them. The actual directions are as follows: “Rank each value in its order of importance to you. Study the list and think of how much each value may act as a guiding principle in your life.” The Rokeach Value Survey has been criticized because people are often not able to rank each value clearly. Some values may be equally important, while some values may be equally unimportant, and so on. Presumably, people are more certain of their most extreme values (i.e. what they love and what they hate) and are not so certain of the ones “in between.” Further, C.J. Clawson and Donald E. Vinson showed that the Rokeach Value Survey omitted a number of values that a large portion of the population holds.

=== Schwartz ===
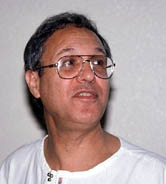
Shalom H. Schwartz

Shalom H. Schwartz, social psychologist and author of The Structure of Human Values: Origins and Implications and Theory of Basic Human Values, has done research on universal values and how they exist in a wide variety of contexts. Most of his work addressed broad questions about values, such as: how are individuals’ priorities affected by social experiences? How do individuals’ priorities influence their behavior and choices? And, how do value priorities influence ideologies, attitudes, and actions in political, religious, environmental, and other domains? Through his studies, Schwartz concluded that ten types of universal values exist: achievement, benevolence, conformity, hedonism, power, security, self-direction, stimulation, tradition, and universalism. Schwartz also tested the possibility of spirituality as an eleventh universal value, but found that it did not exist in all cultures. Schwartz's value theory and instruments are part of the biennial European Social Survey.

=== Allport-Vernon-Lindzey ===
Gordon Allport, a student of American philosopher and psychologist Eduard Spranger, believed that an individual's philosophy is founded upon the values or basic convictions that a person holds about what is and is not important in life. Based on Spranger's (1928) view that understanding the individual's value philosophy best captures the essence of a person, Allport and his colleagues, Vernon and Lindzey, created the Allport-Vernon-Lindzey Study of Values. The values scale outlined six major value types: theoretical (discovery of truth), economic (what is most useful), aesthetic (form, beauty, and harmony), social (seeking love of people), political (power), and religious (unity). Forty years after the study's publishing in 1960, it was the third most-cited non-projective personality measure.

By 1980, the values scale had fallen into disuse due to its archaic content, lack of religious inclusiveness, and dated language. Richard E. Kopelman, et al., recently updated the Allport-Vernon-Lindzey Study of Values. The motivation behind their update was to make the value scale more relevant to today; they believed that the writing was too dated. The updated, copyrighted version was published in Elsevier Science in 2003. Today, permission is required for use. (volume 62)

=== Hartman ===
Philosopher Robert S. Hartman, creator of the Science of Value, introduced and identified the concept of systematic values, which he believed were an important addition to the previously studied intrinsic and extrinsic values. He also made an illuminating distinction between what people value and how people value. How people value parallels very closely with systematic values, which Hartman operationally defined as conceptual constructs or cognitive scripts that exist in people's minds. Ideals, norms, standards, rules, doctrines, and logic systems are all examples of systematic values. If someone's cognitive script is repetitively about violent actions, for instance, then that person is more likely to act vengefully and less likely to value peace. With that additional idea in mind, Harman combined intrinsic, extrinsic, and systematic concepts to create the Hartman Value Profile, also known as the Hartman Value Inventory. The profile consists of two parts. Each part contains 18 paired value-combination items, where nine of these items are positive and nine are negative. The three different types of values, intrinsic, extrinsic, and systematic, can be combined positively or negatively with one another in 18 logically possible ways. Depending on the combination, a certain value is either enhanced or diminished. Once the rankings are completed, the outcome is then compared to the theoretical norm, generating scores for psychological interpretation.

== Applications to psychology ==
Research surrounding understanding values serves as a framework for ideas in many other situations, such as counseling. Psychotherapists, behavioral scientists, and social scientists often deal with intrinsic, extrinsic, and systematic values of their patients. A primary way to learn about patients is to know what they value, as values are essential keys to personality structures. This knowledge can pinpoint serious problems in living, aide immensely in planning therapeutic regimens, and measure therapeutic progress with applications of values scales over time, especially as social environments and social norms change.

== Applications to business and marketing ==
Values are important in the construction of personal morality and as a basis for living life. Recent literature suggests that social values are reflected in a large variety of advertisements and can influence audience reactions to advertising appeals. When a choice is tied to a value, that choice then becomes more attractive to people who share that value. Means-end chain analyses often find that consumers select products with attributes that deliver consequences, which in turn contribute to value fulfillment. In short, people's values resonate in and are observable throughout their daily lives. An example, presented in the Journal of Advertising Research by Eda Gurel-Atay, is coffee. People who endorse fun and enjoyment in life may want a cup of coffee for its rich, pleasant taste. Meanwhile, people who value a sense of accomplishment may rather use coffee as a mild stimulant. People who value warm, loving relationships with others may want a cup of coffee to share in a social manner. Perspective and personal beliefs greatly influence behavior.

Clawson and Vinson (1978) further elaborated on this idea by explaining how values are one of the most powerful explanations of, and influences on, consumer behavior. Values scales are helpful in understanding several aspects of consumption areas and consumer behavior, including leisure, media, and gift giving. People who endorse certain values more highly than others engage in certain activities, prefer certain programs or magazines, or give gifts differently from others. Values scales and the study of values could also be of interest to companies who are looking to build or strengthen their customer relationship management.
