= Three Christs =

2017 film directed by Jon Avnet

- Theatrical release poster
- Directed by: Jon Avnet
- Screenplay by: Eric Nazarian; Jon Avnet
- Based on: The Three Christs of Ypsilanti by Milton Rokeach
- Produced by: Daniel Levin; Molly Hassell; Jon Avnet; Aaron Stern
- Starring: Richard Gere; Peter Dinklage; Walton Goggins; Bradley Whitford; Charlotte Hope; Kevin Pollak; Julianna Margulies
- Cinematography: Denis Lenoir
- Edited by: Patrick J. Don Vito
- Music by: Jeff Russo
- Production companies: Brooklyn Films; Highland Film Group; Narrative Capital
- Distributed by: IFC Films
- Release dates: September 12, 2017 (TIFF); January 10, 2020 (United States)
- Running time: 109 minutes
- Country: United States
- Language: English
- Box office: $37,788

Three Christs, also known as State of Mind, is a 2017 American drama film directed, co-produced, and co-written by Jon Avnet and based on Milton Rokeach's nonfiction book The Three Christs of Ypsilanti. It screened in the Gala Presentations section at the 2017 Toronto International Film Festival. The film is also known as: Three Christs of Ypsilanti, The Three Christs of Ypsilanti, Three Christs of Santa Monica, and The Three Christs of Santa Monica.

== Plot ==
Dr. Alan Stone, a progressive and idealistic psychologist, dropped out of New York University in 1954 to work directly with patients at the Ypsilanti State Mental Asylum. Stone, whose focus is on schizophrenic patients, is widely considered a critic of the system. In the 1950s, people with mental illnesses were mostly kept in institutions and sedated when needed. Treatments with insulin shock therapy and the use of electric shocks were common, while talk therapy was limited.

In Ypsilanti, Stone meets two patients who both believe they are Jesus Christ: the short intellectual Joseph Cassell and the gruff Clyde Benson. Stone develops a format of group talk therapy. He has another patient transferred to Ypsilanti who also believes he is Christ, Leon Gabor, and brings the three men together to study their behavior. He finds out that the problems of the three are completely different. Gabor suffered all his life from his deeply religious mother, and he was also traumatized by multiple rapes by a man he had been exposed to as a soldier. Benson could not cope with the death of his wife from an abortion. Cassell is prone to outbursts of anger. Once admitted to the institution, he was repeatedly sedated with electric shocks, which he developed a great fear of. Contrary to the skepticism of many colleagues, including the head of the institution, Dr. Orbus, Stone dispenses with physical punishment. He gets through to the patients by talking to them and writing them letters.

When he makes the cover of a professional journal with his new approach, it arouses the envy of Dr. Orbus, who wants a share of the fame and to be involved in the treatment. Orbus lets Cassell be taken alone to his office for an interview. It is revealed that Stone wrote the letters to Cassell on Orbus' behalf since the head of the asylum originally declined the task. Cassell feels betrayed by Stone and stalled by Orbus. Despite good behavior, he sees his hopes of leaving the clinic dwindling. Angry, he becomes abusive again, so Orbus orders renewed electric shocks for him. Stone tries to stop it but fails. In a skirmish with another doctor, he injures both of them. Orbus then has him expelled from the institution.

Orbus takes over his patients; however, Cassell, who noticed that Stone wanted to save him, no longer trusts Orbus. During a conversation in the chapel's bell tower with Orbus, he jumps out of the window and dies.

In the later hearing, Stone accuses Orbus of making negligent decisions. He also deciphers Cassell's last words, according to which Cassell not only committed suicide to be free but gave his life to justify the sins of Orbus as Jesus did the sins of humankind. The hearing ends with Stone being fired. However, he is granted permission and funds to continue his study (including of the two remaining patients) in New York. Orbus remains in his post but without decision-making powers until his retirement. The film closes with a summary. Although Stone's therapeutic approach ultimately did not prove to be effective, it would have helped him himself. In the final scene, Stone takes the dead Cassell's seat, playing cards with the two Jesuses.

== Cast ==
- Richard Gere as Dr. Alan Stone
- Julianna Margulies as Ruth Stone
- Peter Dinklage as Joseph Cassel
- Walton Goggins as Leon Gabor
- Bradley Whitford as Clyde Benson
- Kevin Pollak as Dr. Eldrich Orbus
- Charlotte Hope as Becky Henderson
- Stephen Root as Dr. Bill Rogers
- Jane Alexander as Dr. Abrams
- James Monroe Iglehart as Benny
- Julian Acosta as Dr. Francisco
- Danny Deferrari as Neil
- Chris Bannow as Louis
- Kathryn Leigh Scott as Victoria Rogers
- Christina Scherer as Carolyn
- Nancy Robinette as Mrs. Gabor
- Ripley Sobo as Molly Stone

== Production ==
The film is an adaptation of The Three Christs of Ypsilanti, Rokeach's 1964 book-length psychiatric case study of three patients whose paranoid schizophrenic delusions cause each of them to believe he is Jesus Christ. Three Christs began filming in New York in the summer of 2016. The movie includes brief exterior shots of Ypsilanti locations, including the Water Tower and Michigan Avenue.

== Release ==
The film had its world premiere in the Gala Presentations section at the 2017 Toronto International Film Festival. It was released in theaters and on VOD by IFC Films on January 10, 2020. It was released on Shout Factory on June 16, 2020.

== Reception ==
=== Critical response ===
On the review aggregator Rotten Tomatoes, the film holds an approval rating of 43% based on 51 reviews, with an average rating of 5.3/10. The website's critics consensus reads, "Three Christs is far from an unholy mess, but this fact-based drama forsakes its talented cast with a disappointingly facile treatment of genuinely interesting themes." On Metacritic, it has a weighted average score of 39 out of 100, based on 13 critics, indicating "generally unfavorable reviews".
