= After Everything =

After Everything may refer to:

- After Everything (2018 film), an American romantic drama film
- After Everything (2023 film), an American comedy-drama film
