= Jan Wawrzyniak =

Jan Rafał Wawrzyniak
- Citizenship: Polish
- Occupation(s): Value theory, ethics

Jan Rafał Wawrzyniak is a Polish axologist and ethicist, Doctor habilitatus in the humanities, professor at Adam Mickiewicz University in Poznań.

== Biography ==
In 1986, he earned his PhD at Adam Mickiewicz University in Poznań (AMU). In 2001, he obtained his habilitation. From 1983 to 2024, he was employed at Adam Mickiewicz University in Poznań (where he taught, among other subjects, normativistics), and from 2011 to 2014 at the Karol Marcinkowski University of Medical Sciences in Poznań. He was dismissed from AMU following complaints from students, who in course evaluations alleged that his classes were difficult, stressful, and characterized by a tense atmosphere.
