= Theory of value =

Theory of value may refer to:

- Theory of value (economics), where value is meant as economic worth of goods and services
- Value theory, where value is meant in the philosophical sense
