= Daniel Levin (writer) =

American writer, producer, and attorney

- Education: University of Michigan (BA); American Academy in Rome; Harvard Law School
- Occupations: Writer; producer; attorney
- Spouse: Laura Englander (divorced 2022)

Daniel Levin is an American writer, producer, and attorney. His first novel, published in 2009, made The New York Times Best Seller list.

== Early life and education ==
Levin grew up in Hollywood, Florida. Levin earned a B.A. from the University of Michigan in Roman and Greek civilization. In 2004 Levin was a visiting scholar at the American Academy in Rome, studying archeology.

Levin shifted to law and graduated from Harvard Law School in 2007. He first worked clerking for the Chief Justice of the Supreme Court of Israel.

== Personal life ==
Levin was previously married to Dr. Laura Englander. Englander filed for divorce in 2021 and their marriage dissolution was finalized on April 20, 2022.

== Career ==
Daniel founded Narrative Capital in 2014, where he now serves as managing partner. Before starting Narrative Capital, he practiced international law in New York City, where he resides.

=== Literary career ===
Levin's first novel, The Last Ember (2009), is an archeological crime thriller. He told the Miami Herald that the idea came to him while he was in Israel clerking for the Chief Justice of the Supreme Court. He came across a case dealing with illegal excavation and theft of archaeological artifacts. The book launch party was held at Sotheby's.

According to the Canadian writer Ross King, writing in the Los Angeles Times, Jonathan Marcus, the main character of Levin's "smart and well-paced thriller," resembles the author in being a young attorney who trained in archaeology at the American Academy in Rome before going to law school. The Biblical Archaeology Review quibbled about details: Josephus was born in the year 30, not 37. The Globe and Mail called it a "stellar debut" and "a great airplane novel".

In September 2009, Levin's novel hit The New York Times Best Seller list. It was published in paperback in 2010.

Levin blogs at HuffPost.

=== Films ===
Levin was first involved in Lion as an Executive Producer and recently completed the film Three Christs as Producer. His next project is based on Malcolm's Butler's interception in Super Bowl XLIX.

=== Television ===
In 2021, Narrative Capital bought a number of British TV channels from Sony UK and renamed many of them under the Great! brand. As well as Great! Movies and Great! TV, Narrative Capital also now run a number of children's channels like Pop and Tiny Pop.

== Books ==
- The Last Ember 2009, paperback 2010
