= Ethical formalism =

Ethical formalism is a type of ethical theory which defines moral judgments in terms of their logical form (e.g., as "laws" or "universal prescriptions") rather than their content (e.g., as judgments about what actions will best promote human well-being). The term also often carries critical connotations. Kant, for example, has been criticized for defining morality in terms of the formal feature of being a "universal law", and then attempting to derive from this formal feature various concrete moral duties.

Ethical formalism is related to, but not identical to, Harry J. Gensler's relatively recent (circa 1996) theory of formal ethics. Formal ethics is similar to ethical formalism in that it focuses on formal features of moral judgments, but is distinct in that the system of formal ethics is explicitly (and intentionally) incomplete. Specifically, while some ethical formalist systems (e.g., arguably Kant's "universal laws") view a set of formal features as both necessary and sufficient, formal ethics views such formal features as necessary but not sufficient.

Ethical formalism is "considered as an absolutist system, if something is wrong, it is wrong all the time" (Pollock, 2004). Just the same, if something is right, it is then right all the time.

== See also ==
- Formalism (philosophy)
- Axiological ethics
- Ethical naturalism
- Ethical subjectivism
- Moral objectivism
- Moral relativism
- Universal prescriptivism
