= Rokeach Value Survey =

Classification in social sciences

The Rokeach Value Survey (RVS) is a values classification instrument. Developed by social psychologist Milton Rokeach, the instrument is designed for rank-order scaling of 36 values, including 18 terminal and 18 instrumental values. The task for participants in the survey is to arrange the 18 terminal values, followed by the 18 instrumental values, into an order "of importance to YOU, as guiding principles in YOUR life".

The RVS has been studied in the context of personality psychology, behavior, marketing, social structure and cross-cultural studies. There have been a number of attempts to reduce the 18 instrumental values and 18 terminal values into a set of underlying factors, but without consistent success. Attempts have included that by Feather and Peay in 1975 and by Charles Johnston in 1995.

Rokeach's RVS is based on a 1968 volume (Beliefs, Attitudes, and Values) which presented the philosophical basis for the association of fundamental values with beliefs and attitudes. His value system was instrumentalised into the Rokeach Value Survey in his 1973 book The Nature of Human Values.

== Terminal Values ==
Terminal Values refer to desirable end-states of existence. These are the goals that a person would like to achieve during his or her lifetime. These values vary among different groups of people in different cultures.

The terminal values in RVS are:

1. True Friendship
2. Mature Love
3. Self-Respect
4. Happiness
5. Inner Harmony
6. Equality
7. Freedom
8. Pleasure
9. Social Recognition
10. Wisdom
11. Salvation
12. Family Security
13. National Security
14. A Sense of Accomplishment
15. A World of Beauty
16. A World at Peace
17. A Comfortable Life
18. An Exciting Life

== Instrumental Values ==
Instrumental Values refer to preferable modes of behavior. These are preferable modes of behavior, or means of achieving the terminal values.

The Instrumental Values are:

1. Cheerfulness
2. Ambition
3. Love
4. Cleanliness
5. Self-Control
6. Capability
7. Courage
8. Politeness
9. Honesty
10. Imagination
11. Independence
12. Intellect
13. Broad-Mindedness
14. Logic
15. Obedience
16. Helpfulness
17. Responsibility
18. Forgiveness

== Criticisms ==
Keith Gibbins and Iain Walker question whether the values included in the RVS are the ones that are critical. They argue that Rokeach, who started with several hundred values suggested by 130 individuals and a literature review, had inadequate criteria for reducing the values. They also questioned the validity of Rokeach's measures, suggesting that when people rank the values they may not even be ranking the same referents.

== See also ==
- Theory of Basic Human Values
- Values scale
- World Values Survey
  - Inglehart–Welzel cultural map of the world
