= Belief congruence =

In the realm of psychology, the concept of belief congruence suggests that our valuation of beliefs, subsystems or systems of beliefs and people is directly proportional to their congruence with our own belief systems. That similar beliefs promote liking and social harmony among people while dissimilar beliefs produce dislike and prejudice.

Belief congruence was first proposed by Milton Rokeach in 1960, 'belief is more important than ethnic or racial membership as a determinant of social discrimination' – that prejudice arises from how people react to differences, or lack of congruence in belief systems, not just based on inter-group memberships.

This principle was further elaborated by himself later in 1965, that belief system is a crucial alignment point for individuals, thus, the validity of our own beliefs can be confirmed or determined by the level of similarity and congruence of inter-individual belief systems. The principle states that we value beliefs and people based on how closely they align with our own beliefs, considering both similarity and importance. A belief is deemed more congruent if it's either more similar to ours or deemed more important, assuming equal similarity.

== Empirical evidence ==
Rokeach and his colleagues designed an experiment to separate the effects of group membership from belief congruence on individuals' preferences. In this paradigm, participants rated their liking for people who were either part of their own group or a different one, and who had beliefs that were either similar or dissimilar to theirs. The findings from several studies using this methodology consistently showed that shared beliefs were a stronger predictor of liking than simply belonging to the same group. This was illustrated by instances where white participants preferred a black individual with similar beliefs over a white individual with differing beliefs.

Another set of findings from researchers illustrated the powerful effects of belief prejudice over racial categorisation. People's biases matched their views on race, showing that sharing similar beliefs often matters more than race in how we connect with or judge others, particularly for a friendliness assessment.

== Explanation ==
=== Social Identity Theory ===
Social Identity Theory, developed by Henri Tajfel and John Turner, stated that social identity is the portion of an individual's self-concept that comes from their awareness of being part of a social group (or groups) and the emotional importance they place on this membership. Social identity theory believes that race effects could potentially result from comparative judgments individuals make to preserve their social worth or identity. Even though Tajfel didn't directly connect social identity to belief congruence theories, his ideas are still very applicable. For instance, he believes that comparing ourselves with others is what connects our social categories to our sense of who we are. Therefore, in some situations, race effects may result from comparative judgments which serve to boost the individual's value and identity.

== Critiques ==
Since its original presentation, belief congruence theory has also generated a large number of vigorous critiques, testing the theory's hypothesis is challenging because membership in social or ethnic groups often overlaps with similarities within groups and differences between them in many key areas, including beliefs. Moreover, race was found more important than belief when it comes to more intimate relationships such as friendship. Studies found that in situations where stronger measures of attraction are considered, category (e.g. ethnic, race, group) differences become more significant than beliefs.

Critiques also argue that belief congruence primarily addresses discrimination in contexts of small social distance, the theory's applicability to scenarios involving larger social distances, such as neighbourhood or university settings, where prejudice and discrimination might manifest differently, remains questioned.

Moreover, Michael Diehl's research provides a conclusively finding: individuals generally prefer those with similar beliefs, despite similar discrimination levels against both similar and differing beliefs. However, out-groups with beliefs similar to the in-group actually faced more prejudice and discrimination compared to those with differing beliefs.

Another limitation supported by the social-pressure hypothesis of belief congruence theory is that in environments where prejudice is institutionalised or socially accepted, belief congruence does not apply, and prejudice simply becomes a matter of ethnic group membership, as found in empirical evidence from relevant studies.

== 'Weak version' of belief congruence theory ==
According to Milton Rokeach's personal communication in 1981, his intent was to advocate the strong version of the theory, that belief systems are the only factors that need to be considered when analysing prejudice and discrimination. Nonetheless, most studies about this theory are lack of significance tests between belief and race effects, but still show a common trend: beliefs more strongly influence liking and evaluations, while race impacts decisions on intimate connections.

For clarity, Moe et al. (1981) differentiate between two forms of belief congruence theory: a "strong" version and a "weak" version. The "strong" version posits that discrimination is entirely based on belief congruence. Conversely, the "weak" version suggests that belief congruence accounts for a larger portion of discrimination variance than do perceived physical differences. While belief congruence plays a crucial role in contexts free from strong social pressures, its influence does not negate the impact of racial or ethnic differences. It's also important to note that as the impact of race diminishes, the distinction between the strong and weak versions of the theory becomes progressively less relevant for immediate practical purposes.
