= The Three Christs of Ypsilanti =

1964 psychiatric study by Milton Rokeach

The Three Christs of Ypsilanti: A Narrative Study of Three Lost Men
- Cover of the first edition
- Author: Milton Rokeach
- Language: English
- Subject: Psychology, schizophrenia
- Publisher: Knopf
- Publication date: 1964
- Publication place: United States
- Pages: 336
- ISBN: 0394703952 (1973 edition)

The Three Christs of Ypsilanti: A Narrative Study of Three Lost Men is an American book-length psychiatric case study by Milton Rokeach, concerning his experiment on a group of three males with paranoid schizophrenia at Ypsilanti State Hospital in Ypsilanti, Michigan, United States. The book details the interactions of the three patients—Clyde Benson, Joseph Cassel, and Leon Gabor—each of whom believed himself to be Jesus Christ.

== Synopsis ==
Rokeach got the idea from an article in Harper's Magazine describing two women who both believed they were the Virgin Mary. After being assigned as psychiatric hospital roommates, one of the women recovered from her delusion as a result of conversations with the roommate and was discharged. Rokeach was also influenced by Cesare Beccaria's essay On Crimes and Punishments, concerning the subject of Simon Morin, who was claimed to have been potentially cured in a similar way. As a similar study of delusional belief systems, Rokeach brought together three men who each claimed to be Jesus Christ and confronted them with one another's conflicting claims, while encouraging them to interact personally as a support group. Rokeach also attempted to manipulate other aspects of their delusions by inventing messages from imaginary characters. He did not, as he had hoped, provoke any lessening of the patients' delusions, but did document a number of changes in their beliefs.

While initially the three patients quarreled over who was holier and reached the point of physical altercation, they eventually each explained away the other two as being patients with a mental disability in a hospital, or dead and being operated by machines. The graduate students who worked with Rokeach on the project have been strongly critical of the morality of the project because of the amount of dishonesty and manipulation by Rokeach and the amount of distress experienced by the patients. Rokeach added a comment in the final revision of the book that, while the experiment did not cure any of the three Christs, "It did cure me of my godlike delusion that I could manipulate them out of their beliefs."

== Editions ==
The Three Christs of Ypsilanti was first published in 1964. Rokeach came to think that his research had been manipulative and unethical, and offered an apology in the afterword of the 1984 edition of the book: "I really had no right, even in the name of science, to play God and interfere round the clock with their daily lives." The book was re-published by New York Review Books in 2011.

== Cultural impact ==
=== Literature ===
The title is also mentioned in Anne Sexton's poem 'Rapunzel' in her 1971 collection Transformations.

=== Music and theatre ===
The book served as inspiration for the song "Ypsilanti" on the Detroit band Protomartyr's debut album No Passion All Technique.

The book also served as the inspiration for the memory play Trinity by Gary C. Hopper, with music by Tim Kloth.

In 2010 it was announced that Corey Dargel (score) and Honor Molloy (libretto) were developing a stage musical based on the book. The project received a Meet The Composer Commissioning Music/USA Award, and had a developmental workshop presentation at New York Theatre Workshop in 2011. In 2012 Dargel and Molloy received a MAP Fund grant from the Rockefeller Foundation to further develop the musical.

=== Movie adaptation ===
A drama film based on the book, Three Christs, starring Peter Dinklage, Richard Gere, Walton Goggins and Bradley Whitford, and directed by Jon Avnet, was released on September 12, 2017.

== See also ==
- Folie à deux
- Religion and schizophrenia
- Religious delusion
