= Robert S. Hartman =

American philosopher

- Born: Robert Schirokauer Hartman; January 27, 1910; Berlin, German Empire
- Died: September 20, 1973 (aged 63); Cuernavaca, Mexico
- Education: German College of Political Science, University of Paris, London School of Economics, University
- Occupations: Logician and philosopher
- Years active: 1932–1973
- Known for: Formal axiology
- Notable work: The Structure of Value, Five Lectures on Formal Axiology, The Revolution Against War

Robert Schirokauer Hartman (January 27, 1910 – September 20, 1973) was a German-American logician and philosopher. His primary field of study was scientific axiology (the science of value) and he is known as its original theorist. His axiology is the basis of the Hartman Value Inventory (also known as the "Hartman Value Profile (HVP)", which is used in psychology to measure the character of an individual.

== Early life ==
Robert S. Hartman was born in Berlin, Germany on January 27, 1910. He studied at the German College of Political Science, and also at the University of Paris, the London School of Economics, and at the University of Berlin from which he received an LL.B. degree in 1932.

He started working as instructor in administrative law and the philosophy of law at the University of Berlin, and he also served as Assistant Judge of the District court, Berlin-Charlottenburg. In 1932 he left Germany for Britain and "started working for Walt Disney Productions as a copyright representative in Britain and later opened offices for Disney in Denmark, Norway, Finland and Sweden where he met and married his wife. The Hartmans moved to Mexico City where he represented Disney Productions in Central America and the Antilles."

== Career ==
Hartman's rejection of Fascism brought him into conflict with the Nazi party and forced him to leave Germany, using a fake passport, in 1932. He legally changed his name, which originally was Robert Schirokauer, to the name on his passport, Robert S. (for Schirokauer) Hartman. In 1938, using a Swedish passport, he, his wife, and son left Europe for Mexico, where they lived until their immigration in 1941 to the United States, where they later became citizens.

In 1941 he migrated to the United States and became a citizen. He did his doctoral work in philosophy at Northwestern University in 1946. He taught at the University of Berlin and at Lake Forest Academy near Chicago. He was a professor of philosophy at the College of Wooster (1945 - 1948) and at Ohio State University (1948 - 1956) and was a visiting professor at the Massachusetts Institute of Technology (1955 - 1956) and at Yale University in 1966. Hartman was a Research Fellow and Exchange Professor at the National University of Mexico from 1956 - 1957, and from 1957 until his death he was a research professor of philosophy there. From 1968 until his death Hartman also held an appointment as a professor of philosophy at the University of Tennessee. In the late 1950s he was among the first members of the Society for General Systems Research.

From 1950-1957 he was Chairman of the Commission on Peace for the International Council of Community Churches. He served as Executive Director of the Council of Profit-Sharing Industries, and wrote its first manual. He was a founder of the Deutsche Institute fur Social-Wirtschaftliche Betriebsgestaltung (industrial organization). He was a founding sponsor of the American Association for Humanistic Psychology. He has been credited with being the founding spirit behind the prevailing business-retirement plan in the United States today, the 401K Plan. He was the first President of the American Society for Value Inquiry, founded in 1971 by James Wilbur.

He served as consultant for the practical application of Value Theory with AT&T, General Foods, General Electric, and IBM.

== Death ==
Hartman died in Cuernavaca, Mexico on September 20, 1973. He had one child, a son, Jan. Jan Hartman was an Emmy-winning screenwriter, author, and playwright. He died of heart failure in October 2006. He was married to Lorie Hartman for three decades, a professor of literature at NYU, and later remarried to Stacey McNutt, a writer and an editor. He is survived by his two daughters, Katherine Hartman, a writer and professor and Tanya Hartman, an artist and professor.

== Work ==
He was the subject of doctoral dissertations, including that of a former Chairman of the Philosophy Department at the University of Tennessee, Professor John Davis, as well as of Marvin Charles Katz, whose thesis was later published as a book entitled Trends Towards Synthesis.

He has published papers on the phenomenology of group measurement, on universal constants in Physics (in his role as a philosopher of science), on the logic of description and valuation, on the contribution of St. Anselm, and on the Concept of Self in Søren Kierkegaard.

=== Value theory ===
The reference book Who Knows What listed Hartman as one of the two living authorities on value theory (the other was Charles W. Morris (1903-1979). Among Hartman's publications are the report on Value Theory for the Institut International de Philosophis 1949-1955, published by UNESCO; his magnum opus The Structure of Value (1967 Southern Illinois University Press); and at the time of his death in 1973 he was working on a manuscript entitled The Measurement of Value.

Another critical work is his Knowledge of Good (Robert S. Hartman, Arthur Ellis and Rem B. Edwards, 2002 Rodopi Press) a thorough study of all the philosophical discussions of goodness and what gaps exist in a complete philosophy of value. Hartman shows how his Formal Value Theory fills these gaps.

== Robert S. Hartman Institute ==
The Robert S. Hartman Institute for Formal and Applied Axiology was founded in 1976 and exists for the sole purpose of advancing the axiological work of Robert S. Hartman. The Institute was developed in cooperation with heirs of Robert S. Hartman to advance study relating to Robert S. Hartman's unpublished and unfinished works held in the collections of the graduate library of the University of Tennessee, Knoxville.

The Hartman Institute affirms the importance of a diversity of approaches to the formalization, interpretation, and application of Hartman’s theory, and it has no allegiance to any particular business model or organization.

=== The Journal of Formal Axiology ===
The Journal of Formal Axiology is published once a year, since 2008, by the Robert S. Hartman Institute. Each edition is focused on advancing formal axiology and the value theory of Robert.S. Hartman and includes articles dealing primarily with axiological practice and application, as well as with theoretical issues. Articles may be critical, constructive, creative, theoretical, or applied, and are focused on advancing our understanding of Hartmanian axiology and/or what can be done with it.

=== Membership types ===
The Robert S. Hartman Institute is a volunteer-run organization made up of a global membership base. Membership types include Professional Membership, Teacher/Instructor Membership, Student Membership, and Axiological Service Provider Membership.

== Published works ==
Hartman was a writer with some of his works published and many available in their original manuscript form at the University of Tennessee Knoxville Archives. The Robert S. Hartman Institute is working to bring as many of these manuscripts to publication as possible.

=== The Structure of Value: Foundations of Scientific Axiology ===
Hartman's revolutionary book introduces formal orderly thinking into value theory. It identifies three basic kinds of value, intrinsic goods (e.g. people as ends in themselves), extrinsic goods (e.g. things and actions as means to ends), and systemic goods (conceptual values). All good things share a common formal or structural pattern: they fulfill the ideal standards or "concepts" that we apply to them. Thus, this theory is called "formal axiology" Some values are richer in good-making property-fulfillment than others, so some desirable things are better than others and form patterned hierarchies of value. How we value is just as important as what we value, and evaluations, like values, share structures or formal patterns, as this book demonstrates. Hartman locates all of this solidly within the framework of historical value theory, but he moves successfully and creatively beyond philosophical tradition and toward the creation of a new value science

=== The Knowledge of Good: Critique of Axiological Reason ===
This book presents Robert S. Hartman's formal theory of value and critically examines many other twentieth century value theorists in its light.

=== Five Lectures on Formal Axiology ===
During the final decade or so of his life, Hartman frequently delivered a series of lectures in which he outlined the need for a scientific theory of human values, the theoretical requirements demanded of an effective value theory, and his rationale behind the development of the particular value theory he developed, which he named formal axiology. He named these lectures, collectively, Five Lectures in Formal Axiology. Written as they were for oral delivery, they have a cadence and clarity to them that make them a pleasure to read.

Hartman concludes these lectures with a description of how his theory might be applied in various real-world situations. Specifically, he discusses how formal axiology can be applied to studies of economics and political economies, including profit sharing; to international affairs, including matters of war and peace; and to personal ethics. To Hartman, nothing less than the survival of human existence depends on this.

=== The Revolution Against War: Selected Writings on War and Peace ===
Hartman devoted much of his extraordinary intellectual capacity to understanding and articulating the political, philosophical, psychological, and spiritual causes of war so that humankind could stop waging war and start living together in peace. This collection of essays by Hartman reveal, for the first time in one place, the range and depth of his thoughts on this subject. It also traces how his own understanding of the role of war in human society evolved during his lifetime. It was his study of war that led, in large part, to his development of the value theory for which he is best known—formal axiology. Hartman's ideas, if understood and embraced, may well lead to fulfillment of his hope that we can learn to live in peace.

== See also ==
- American philosophy
- List of American philosophers
