= Christina Scherer =

American actress

- Occupation: Actor
- Years active: 2010–present

Christina Scherer is an American actress. Her most notable role is that of chief assistant Becky in the 2015 comedy The Intern.

== Career ==
She has appeared in supporting roles in American television and films since 2010. In 2016, she produced two short films, Katie Goes to College and Two Dollar Bill. At the same time she was also active as a photographer.

Since moving to New York City in 2019, she has worked mainly as a painter and art teacher.

== Personal life ==
Scherer's early life was described as "somewhat nomadic", and names several previous home towns, including: Louisville, Las Vegas, Flagstaff, Sedona, and some places in California.

== Filmography ==
=== Film ===
Year	Title	Role	Notes
2010	Cold Cabin	Haley	
2015	Wrestling Isn't Wrestling	Chris Benoit	
2015	The Intern	Becky	
2016	Katie Goes to College		Short film; producer
2016	Two Dollar Bill	Greta	Short film
2016	Interior Night	Esther	
2017	Nowhere, Michigan	April	
2017	Three Christs	Carolyn	
2017	Anything	Young Woman	
2018	After Everything	Jenny	
2018	Decadeless	Claudia	Short film

=== Television ===
Year	Title	Role	Notes
2010	Medium	Shannon Mitchell	Episode: "It's a Wonderful Death"
2010	Grey's Anatomy	Lauren	Episode: "Slow Night, So Long"
2012	Two and a Half Men	Jenny	Episode: "Palmdale, Ech"
2012	CSI: NY	Mary Portico	Episode: "2,918 Miles"
2012	Perception	Shannon Duquesne	Episode: "Kilimanjaro"
2013	Touch	Julie	Episode: "Ghosts"
2013	True Blood	Occupy Girl	Episode: "Who Are You, Really?"
2013	The Young and the Restless	Adult Delia	Episode: "Shadow of Passion"
2016	Pleasant Events	Hannah	
