= Formal ethics =

Formal logical system

Formal ethics is a formal logical system for describing and evaluating the "form" as opposed to the "content" of ethical principles. Formal ethics was introduced by Harry J. Gensler, in part in his 1990 logic textbook Symbolic Logic: Classical and Advanced Systems, but was more fully developed and justified in his 1996 book Formal Ethics.

Formal ethics is related to ethical formalism in that its focus is the forms of moral judgments, but the exposition in Formal Ethics makes it clear that Gensler, unlike previous ethical formalists, does not consider formal ethics to be a complete ethical theory (such that the correct form would be necessary and sufficient for an ethical principle to be "correct"). In fact, the theorems of formal ethics could be seen as a largest common subset of most widely recognized ethical theories, in that none of its axioms (with the possible exception of rationality) is controversial among philosophers of ethics.

== Symbolic representation ==
The axioms and theorems of formal ethics can be represented with the standard notation of predicate logic (but with a grammar closer to higher-order logics), augmented with imperative, deontic, belief, and modal logic symbols.

Formal logic uses an underlined symbol (e.g. $\underline{A}$) to represent an imperative. If the same symbol is used without an underline, then the plain symbol is an indicative and the underlined symbol is an imperative version of the same proposition. For example, if we take the symbol $A$ to mean the indicative "You eat an apple", then $\underline{A}$ means the imperative "Eat an apple". When a proposition is given as a predicate with one or more of the arguments representing agents, the agent to which the imperative applies is underlined. For example, if $Dux$ means "You give a dollar to x" then $D\underline{u}x$ is the correct way to express "Give a dollar to x".

Within the system of formal ethics, an imperative is taken to represent a preference rather than a demand (called "anti-modal" view, because an underline doesn't behave like a modal operator). With this interpretation, the negation of an imperative (e.g. $\neg \underline{A}$) is taken to mean "Don't do A", not "You may omit A". To express demands, an imperative modal operator $M$ (for may) is defined, so that $M \underline{A}$ = "You may do A" and $\neg M \neg \underline{A}$ = "You may not omit doing A" = "You must do A". Note that $M$ is different from the deontic $R$ "all right" operator defined below, as "You must do A" is still an imperative, without any ought judgment (i.e. not the same as "You ought to do A").

Following Castañeda's approach, the deontic operators $O$ (for ought) and $R$ (for all right, represented $P$ for permissible in some deontic logic notations) are applied to imperatives. This is opposed to many deontic logics which apply the deontic operators to indicatives. Doing so avoids a difficulty of many deontic logics to express conditional imperatives. An often given example is If you smoke, then you ought to use an ashtray. If the deontic operators $O$ and $R$ only attach to indicatives, then it is not clear that either of the following representations is adequate:

$$O(\mathrm{smoke} \to \mathrm{ashtray})$$
$$\mathrm{smoke} \to O(\mathrm{ashtray})$$

However, by attaching the deontic operators to imperatives, we have unambiguously

$$O(\mathrm{smoke} \to \underline{\mathrm{ashtray}})$$

Belief logic symbols, when combined with imperative logic, allow beliefs and desires to be expressed. The notation $u:A$ is used for beliefs ("You believe A") and $u:\underline{A}$ for desires ("You desire A"). In formal ethics, desire is taken in a strong sense when the agent of the belief is the same as the agent of the imperative. The following table shows the different interpretations for $i:\underline{A}$ depending on the agent and the tense of the imperative:

$A$ is an imperative for:	Me	Someone else
Present	I act to do A	I want the person to do A
Future	I resolve to do A	I want the person to do A
Past	I am glad A was done, or I regret that A wasn't done

This strong interpretation of desires precludes statements such as "I want to get out of bed (right now), but I don't act to get out of bed". It does not, however, preclude "I want to get out of bed (right now), but I don't get out of bed". Perhaps I act to get out of bed (make my best effort), but can't for some reason (e.g. I am tied down, my legs are broken, etc.).

Beliefs may be indicative, as above, or imperative (e.g. $\underline{u} : A$ "Believe A", $\underline{u} : \underline{A}$ "Desire A"). They may also be combined with the deontic operators. For example, if $G$ means "God exists", then $O(\underline{u}:G)$ is "You ought to believe that God exists", and $(x)O(\underline{x}:G)$ is "Everyone ought to believe that God exists".

The modal operators $\square$ and $\diamond$ are used with their normal meanings in modal logic. In addition, to address the fact that logicians may disagree on what is logically necessary or possible, causal modal operators are separately defined to express that something is causally necessary or possible. The causal modal operators are represented $\underset{c}{\square}$ and $\underset{c}{\diamond}$. In addition, an operator $\blacksquare$ is used to mean "in every actual or hypothetic case". This is used, for example, when expressing deontic and prescriptive counterfactuals, and is weaker than $\square$. For example,

$\blacksquare(O\underline{A} \to \underline{A})$ means "In every actual or hypothetical case, if you ought to do A, do A"

whereas

$\square(O\underline{A} \to \underline{A})$ means "You ought to do A logically entails do A"

Finally, formal ethics is a higher-order logic in that it allows properties, predicates that apply to other predicates. Properties can only be applied to actions, and the imperative notation is used (e.g. $F\underline{A}$ = "action A has property F"). The only types of property that formal ethics admits are universal properties, properties are not evaluative and do not make reference to proper names or pointer words. The following are examples of properties that are not universal properties:

- $W$, where $W\underline{A}$ means "Act A is wrong" (evaluative)
- $G$, where $G\underline{A}$ means "Act A angers God" (proper name)
- $I$, where $I\underline{A}$ mean "Act A is something I do" (pointer word)

Requiring a property to be universal, however, is different from requiring it to be morally relevant. $B$, where $B \underline{A}$ means "Act A is done by a black person" is a universal property, but would not be considered morally relevant to most acts in most ethical theories. Formal ethics has a definition of relevantly similar actions that imposes certain consistency constraints, but does not have a definition of morally relevant properties.

The notation $G \ast \underline{A}$ is used to mean "G is a complete description of A in universal terms". Put another way, $G$ is a logical conjunction of all universal properties that $\underline{A}$ has. The $G \ast \underline{A}$ notation is the basis for the definition of exactly similar actions and is used in the definition of relevantly similar actions.

== Axioms ==
Formal ethics has four axioms in addition to the axioms of predicate and modal logic. These axioms (with the possible exception of Rationality, see below) are largely uncontroversial within ethical theory.

In natural language, the axioms might be given as follows:

- $P$ (Prescriptivity) — "Practice what you preach"
- $U$ (Universalizability) — "Make similar evaluations about similar cases"
- $R$ (Rationality) — "Be consistent"
- $E$ (Ends-Means) — "To achieve an end, do the necessary means"

Care must be taken in translating each of these natural language axioms to a symbolic representation, in order to avoid axioms that produce absurd results or contradictions. In particular, the axioms advocated by Gensler avoid "if-then" forms in favor of "don't combine" forms.
