= Science of value =

Philosophical theory

The science of value, or value science, is a creation of philosopher Robert S. Hartman, which attempts to formally elucidate value theory using both formal and symbolic logic.

== Fundamentals ==
The fundamental principle, which functions as an axiom, and can be stated in symbolic logic, is that a thing is good insofar as it exemplifies its concept. To put it another way, "a thing is good if it has all its descriptive properties." This means, according to Hartman, that the good thing has a name, that the name has a meaning defined by a set of properties, and that the thing possesses all of the properties in the set. A thing is bad if it does not fulfill its description.

He introduces three basic dimensions of value, systemic, extrinsic and intrinsic for sets of properties—perfection is to systemic value what goodness is to extrinsic value and what uniqueness is to intrinsic value—each with their own cardinality: finite, $\aleph_0$ and $\aleph_1$. In practice, the terms "good" and "bad" apply to finite sets of properties, since this is the only case where there is a ratio between the total number of desired properties and the number of such properties possessed by some object being valued. (In the case where the number of properties is countably infinite, the extrinsic dimension of value, the exposition as well as the mere definition of a specific concept is taken into consideration.)

Hartman quantifies this notion by the principle that each property of the thing is worth as much as each other property, depending on the level of abstraction. Hence, if a thing has n properties, each of them—if on the same level of abstraction—is proportionally worth n^{−1}.

== Infinite sets of properties ==
Hartman goes on to consider infinite sets of properties. Hartman claims that according to a theorem of transfinite mathematics, any collection of material objects is at most denumerably infinite. This is not, in fact, a theorem of mathematics. But, according to Hartman, people are capable of a denumerably infinite set of predicates, intended in as many ways, which he gives as $\aleph_1$. As this yields a notional cardinality of the continuum, Hartman advises that when setting out to describe a person, a continuum of properties would be most fitting and appropriate to bear in mind. This is the cardinality of intrinsic value in Hartman's system.

Although they play no role in ordinary mathematics, Hartman deploys the notion of aleph number reciprocals, as a sort of infinitesimal proportion. This, he contends goes to zero in the limit as the uncountable cardinals become larger. In Hartman's calculus, for example, the assurance in a Dear John letter, that "we will always be friends" has axiological value $\frac{_1}{\aleph_2}$, whereas taking a metaphor literally would be slightly preferable, the reification having a value of $\frac{_1}{\aleph_1}$.
