= Axiological ethics =

Ethical theory about values

In philosophy, axiological ethics is concerned with the values by which people uphold ethical standards, and the investigation and development of theories of ethical behaviour. Axiological ethics investigates and questions what the intellectual bases for a system of values are. Axiological ethics explores the justifications for value systems, and examines if there exists an objective justification, beyond arbitrary personal preference, for the existence and practise of a given value system. Moreover, although axiological ethics are a subfield of ethical philosophy, axiological investigation usually includes epistemology and value theory.

== Ethics and axiology ==
To understand axiological ethics, an understanding of axiology and ethics is necessary. Axiology is the philosophical study of goodness (value) and is concerned with two questions. The first question regards defining and exploring understandings of 'the good' or value. This includes, for example, the distinction between intrinsic and instrumental values. The second area is the application of such understandings of value to a variety of fields within the social sciences and humanities.

Ethics is a philosophical field which is concerned with morality, and in particular, the conduction of the right action. The defining of what the 'right' action is influenced by axiological thought in itself, much like the defining of 'beauty' within the philosophical branch of aesthetics.

== Objectives ==
Axiological ethics can be understood as the application of axiology onto the study of ethics. It is concerned with questioning the moral grounds which we base ethical judgements on. This is done through questioning the values in which ethical principles are grounded on. Once there is recognition and understanding of the underlying values hidden within ethical claims, they can be assessed and critiqued. Through breaking ethics down to an examination of values, rather than the good, morality can be reconstructed based on redefined values or confirmed on already set values.

== History ==
Franz Brentano's descriptive psychology constitutes an important precursor of axiological ethics. He classifies all mental phenomena into three groups: representations, judgments and phenomena of love. Of particular interest for axiological ethics are phenomena of love since they constitute the basis for our knowledge of values: an object has value if it is fitting to love this object. This insight into what is good then informs the discipline of ethics: "the right end consists in the best of what is attainable".

Max Scheler, one of the main early proponents of axiological ethics, agrees with Brentano that experience is a reliable source for the knowledge of values. Scheler, following the phenomenological method, holds that this knowledge is not just restricted to particular cases but that we can gain insight a priori into the essence of values. This insight reveals that there are different types of values, which form a hierarchy from lower to higher values: pleasure, useful, noble, good and true and beautiful, sacred. This order is essential to ethics: we ought to promote the higher values rather than the lower ones in our actions. The order of values is objective but our perception of this order is subjective and may therefore be distorted. Such distortions may lead us to prefer the lower values to the higher ones.

Nicolai Hartmann builds in many important aspects on Scheler's axiological ethics. He also provides a platonist metaphysics of values, complementing the intuitive insight a priori into values.

John Niemeyer Findlay, a moral philosophy and metaphysics professor at Yale University, wrote Axiological Ethics in 1970. Findlay's book is a modern historical account of academic discussion around axiological ethics. As such, it contains discussion of other philosophers' and his own concluding remarks regarding the topic. Findlay advocates for inquiry into values behind ethical theories and what justifications exist for them. Through assessing the thoughts of his academic peers, Findlay's final thoughts on the topic is that an objective justification for values would be unlikely. Rather, since validation is recognized as coming from the subject, values would have to be assessed internally.

== Opposed views ==
Proponents of axiological ethics often contrast their view with both Kantian ethics and eudaimonism. Kantian ethics is rejected mainly on grounds of its formalism, which is exemplified e.g. in Kant's formulation of the categorical imperative: "Act only according to that maxim whereby you can at the same time will that it should become a universal law". The main criticism of ethical formalism is that it tries to define right action in purely formal terms without reference to whether the resulting action is valuable in any sense. It ignores that our actions are guided by various values which we try to realize. The critique of eudaimonism is not that it ignores values altogether but that its view of what is valuable is too narrow. Our actions should be guided by a wide variety of values, including promoting pleasure and avoiding pain, but also other values like health, beauty, etc. This can be seen in Scheler's hierarchy of values, in which only one level of values, the lowest, is reserved for pleasure and pain.

== Criticism ==
Axiological ethics has been criticized for its epistemology and metaphysics. Most of its proponents rely on the idea that we can gain an insight a priori into the essence of values. While this thesis is itself controversial, it becomes even more problematic when combined with the idea of value-blindness, the thesis that some people may be (for various reasons) unable to properly intuit the essences of values. This can easily lead to a dogmatic position where the proponent of axiological ethics justifies her own view through intuition and dismisses opposing views as misguided due to value-blindness.

The metaphysical critique of axiological ethics concerns the tendency to reify values and treat them as proper entities of their own. This tendency is present in many proponents of axiological ethics but it is most explicit in Hartmann's position.
