= Intrinsic and extrinsic properties (philosophy) =

Property that a thing has of itself

An intrinsic property is a property that a thing has itself, independently of anything else. An extrinsic (or relational) property is a property that depends on a thing's relationship with other things. For example, mass is an intrinsic property of any physical object, whereas weight is an extrinsic property that varies depending on the strength of the gravitational field in which the respective object is placed. The question of intrinsicality and extrinsicality in empirically observable objects is a significant field of study in ontology, the branch of philosophy concerned with explaining the fundamental nature of being.

== Criteria ==
David Lewis offered a list of criteria that should condense the distinction between intrinsic and extrinsic properties (numbers and italics added):

1. A sentence or statement or proposition that ascribes intrinsic properties to something is entirely about that thing; whereas an ascription of extrinsic properties to something is not entirely about that thing, though it may well be about some larger whole which includes that thing as part.
2. A thing has its intrinsic properties in virtue of the way that thing itself, and nothing else, is. Not so for extrinsic properties, though a thing may well have these in virtue of the way some larger whole is.
3. The intrinsic properties of something depend only on that thing; whereas the extrinsic properties of something may depend, wholly or partly, on something else.
4. If something has an intrinsic property, then so does any perfect duplicate of that thing; whereas duplicates situated in different surroundings will differ in their extrinsic properties.

== Value ==
Intrinsic properties are fundamental in understanding Kantian deontological ethics, which is based upon the argument that an action should be viewed on its intrinsic value (the value of the action in itself) with regard to ethics and morality, as opposed to consequentialist utilitarian arguments that an action should be viewed by the value of its outcomes.

== Intrinsicism and extrinsicism ==
=== Intrinsicism ===
Intrinsicism is the belief that value is a non-relational characteristic of an object. This means that an object can be good or bad without reference to who it is good or bad for, and without reference to the reason it is good or bad. One example of this might be the belief that certain sex acts are intrinsically evil, even if they harm no one.

=== Extrinsicism ===
Extrinsicism is the tendency to place major emphasis on external matters rather than on more profound realities. In terms of morals and ethics, it tends to stress the external observance of laws and precepts, with lesser concern for the ultimate principles underlying moral conduct.

== See also ==
- Brute fact
- Transcendental
