= Intrinsic value (ethics) =

Ethical or philosophic value that an object has "in itself" or "for its own sake"

In ethics, intrinsic value is a property of anything that is valuable on its own. Intrinsic value is in contrast to instrumental value (also known as extrinsic value), which is a property of anything that derives its value from a relation to another intrinsically valuable thing. Intrinsic value is always something that an object has "in itself" or "for its own sake", and is an intrinsic property. An object with intrinsic value may be regarded as an end, or in Kantian terminology as an end-in-itself.

The term "intrinsic value" is used in axiology, a branch of philosophy that studies value (including both ethics and aesthetics). All major normative ethical theories identify something as being intrinsically valuable. For instance, for a virtue ethicist, eudaimonia (human flourishing, sometimes translated as "happiness") has intrinsic value, whereas things that bring you happiness (such as having a family) may be merely instrumentally valuable. Similarly, consequentialists may identify pleasure, the lack of pain, and/or the fulfillment of one's preferences as having intrinsic value, making actions that produce them merely instrumentally valuable. On the other hand, proponents of deontological ethics argue that morally right actions (those that respect moral duty to others) are always intrinsically valuable, regardless of their consequences.

Other names for intrinsic value are terminal value and essential value, principle value, or ultimate importance.

== An 'end' ==
In philosophy and ethics, an end, or telos, is the ultimate goal in a series of steps. For example, according to Aristotle the end of everything we do is happiness. It is contrasted to a means, which is something that helps you achieve that goal. For example, money or power may be said to be a means to the end of happiness. Nevertheless, some objects may be ends and means at the same time.

End is roughly similar, and often used as a synonym, for the following concepts:

- Purpose or aim: in its most general sense the anticipated result that guides action.
- Goal or objective consists of a projected state of affairs a person or a system plans or intends to achieve or bring about.

== Types of intrinsic value ==
=== Absolute and relative ===
There may be a distinction between absolute and relative ethic value regarding intrinsic value.

Relative intrinsic value is subjective, depending on individual and cultural views and/or the individual choice of life stance. Absolute intrinsic value, on the other hand, is philosophically absolute and independent of individual and cultural views, as well as independent on whether it discovered or not what object has it.

There is an ongoing discussion on whether an absolute intrinsic value exists at all, for instance in pragmatism. In pragmatism, John Dewey's empirical approach did not accept intrinsic value as an inherent or enduring property of things. He saw it as an illusory product of our continuous ethic valuing activity as purposive beings. When held across only some contexts, Dewey held that goods are only intrinsic relative to a situation. In other words, he only believed in relative intrinsic value, but not any absolute intrinsic value. He held that across all contexts, goodness is best understood as instrumental value, with no contrasting intrinsic goodness. In other words, Dewey claimed that anything can only be of intrinsic value if it is a contributory good.

=== Positive and negative ===
There may be both positive and negative value regarding intrinsic value, wherein something of positive intrinsic value is pursued or maximized, while something of negative intrinsic value is avoided or minimized. For instance, in utilitarianism, pleasure has positive intrinsic value and suffering has negative intrinsic value.

== Similar concepts ==
Intrinsic value is mainly used in ethics, but the concept is also used in philosophy, with terms that essentially may refer to the same concept.

- As "ultimate importance" it is what a sentient being relates to in order to constitute a life stance.
- It is synonymous with the meaning of life, as this may be expressed as what is meaningful or valuable in life. However, meaning of life is more vague, with other uses as well.
- Summum bonum is basically its equivalent in medieval philosophy.
- The relative intrinsic value is roughly synonymous with the ethic ideal.
- Inherent value may be regarded as a first grade instrumental value when personal experience is the intrinsic value.

== See also ==
- Animal ethics
- Extrinsic value (ethics)
- Intrinsic value (finance)
- Ophelimity
- Value system
- Value theory
