= Ypsilanti State Hospital =

Former hospital in Michigan, United States

Coordinates: 42°9′42.52″N 83°41′33.69″W

The Ypsilanti State Hospital housed and treated patients for mental health disorders. The hospital complex was located at the northeast corner of Platt and Willis Roads, in York Charter Township; one mile south of the boundary with Pittsfield Charter Township and two miles west of the Augusta Charter Township boundary. The City of Saline was four miles due west of the hospital on Willis Road, while the City of Milan was five miles due south on Platt Road. The hospital, which was three miles from the point where York and Ypsilanti charter townships meet, was called "Ypsilanti" because the area is served by the Ypsilanti telephone exchange.

== History ==
On June 16, 1930, construction for the hospital had begun. Albert Kahn was the architect that had designed the building. Kahn had his own design firm in Detroit, Michigan. The hospital was opened a year after construction had begun. Over the course of the first year the hospital had admitted 922 patients. The estimated cost of living was about eighty cents per day.

At the end of World War II The Ypsilanti State Hospital had built two new buildings with over 4,000 patients. After adding the two wards, this still brought the hospital over capacity.

In 1991, Governor John Engler cut all funding for state hospitals. The Ypsilanti State Hospital was the first to be shut down. The forensic center stayed open until 2001, but when the hospital closed this left many patients homeless. They were left with nothing, most of the patients having lost all contact with family and friends. The Ypsilanti State Hospital had been abandoned for sixteen years before being demolished in 2006.

Toyota bought the property to develop the Toyota Technical Center on the site, and all remnants of the hospital complex are gone.

== Treatments ==
The Ypsilanti State Hospital employed many different types of therapy and treatments for their patients. Within the hospitals first five years it had been open, there were 13,329 different treatments. These treatments are broken up into two different categories: hydrotherapy and physiotherapy.

=== Hydrotherapy ===
Hydrotherapy is a type of treatment based on an assortment of treatments dealing with water. Some of these treatments were needle showers, fan douches, jet douches, salt glows, general messages, local massages, sitz baths, foot baths, ultraviolet radiations, electric light cabinet baths, bubble baths, hot fomentations, colloidal baths, and surgical dressings.

=== Physiotherapy ===
Physiotherapy is a treatment that exposes the patient to ultra-violet and infrared lights. Some of these treatments included ultra-violet light, infrared light, electric bake, and diathermy. In 1937 the Ypsilanti State Hospital was introduced to several different shock therapies, including electric shock.

== Three Christs of Ypsilanti ==
In 1959 there were three patients with schizophrenia who became quite famous. Each of them believed he was God. A book about them is titled The Three Christs of Ypsilanti. Milton Rokeach, author of the book, was a social psychologist. He put the three men in contact with each other in an effort to determine whether one or more would abandon his delusions of divinity as a result of being in contact with others. Little change in their beliefs was recorded, although one showed temporary improvement. The three men stayed in residence at the hospital for the remainder of their lives.
