= Milton Rokeach =

American psychologist

- Born: Mendel Rokicz; December 27, 1918; Hrubieszów, Poland
- Died: October 25, 1988 (aged 69); Los Angeles, California, US
- Education: Brooklyn College; University of California, Berkeley
- Known for: The Three Christs of Ypsilanti, Rokeach Value Survey
- Spouse: Sandra Ball-Rokeach
- Children: 2
- Scientific career
- Workplaces: Michigan State University; University of Western Ontario; Washington State University; University of Southern California
- Thesis: Generalized mental rigidity as a factor in ethnocentrism (1947)

Milton Rokeach (born as Mendel Rokicz, December 27, 1918 – October 25, 1988) was a Polish-born American social psychologist. He taught at Michigan State University, the University of Western Ontario, Washington State University, and the University of Southern California. A Review of General Psychology survey, published in 2002, ranked Rokeach as the 85th most cited psychologist of the 20th century.

== Early life ==
Born to Jewish parents in Hrubieszów, Poland, Rokeach emigrated to the United States with his parents at age seven. After graduating from Brooklyn College, he received his Ph.D. degree from the University of California, Berkeley, in 1947.

== Contributions to psychology ==
From 1959 to 1961, Rokeach conducted a well-known experiment at the Ypsilanti State Hospital in which he observed the interaction of three mentally ill patients, each of whom believed he was Jesus Christ. The resulting publication, The Three Christs of Ypsilanti, was Rokeach's most famous research in values and beliefs, and was subsequently adapted into a screenplay, a stage play, two operas and a movie.

In addition, Rokeach conducted a mid-20th–century study in the Southern United States, where he tried to determine the basis for racial prejudice. He found racial prejudice to be inversely related to socio-economic status and thus concluded that such bias is used in an attempt to elevate one's own status.

Rokeach studied long-term attitude change, which earned his ranking as the 26th most frequently cited psychologist at that time in social science abstracts. In the final years of his career, Rokeach wrote The Nature of Human Values (1973) which served as the test manual for the Rokeach Value Survey (see values scales). Rokeach also did experimental work in problem-solving, and additional factor analyses on the construction of a scale to measure dogmatism. In the book, he posited that relatively few "terminal human values" are the internal reference points that all people use to formulate attitudes and opinions. Furthermore, by measuring the "relative ranking" of the values, one could predict a wide variety of behaviors, including political affiliation and religious belief. This theory led to a series of experiments in which changes in values led to measurable changes.

== Personal life ==
Rokeach taught psychology at various universities, such as Michigan State, Western Ontario, Washington State, and Southern California. In 1969, Rokeach married sociologist Sandra Ball-Rokeach.

== Awards ==
In 1984, Rokeach received the Kurt Lewin Memorial Award of the American Psychological Association. In 1988, he received the Harold Lasswell Award of the International Society of Political Psychology.

== Bibliography ==
- The Open and Closed Mind (1960)
- The Three Christs of Ypsilanti Google Books Link (1964)
- Beliefs, Attitudes, and Values: A Theory of Organization and Change (1968)
- The Nature of Human Values (1973)
- Understanding Human Values: Individual and Societal (1979)
- (with Sandra Ball-Rokeach and Joel W. Grube) The Great American Values Test: Influencing Behavior and Belief Through Television (1984)

== See also ==
- Belief congruence
