= After Everything (2018 film) =

2018 film by Hannah Marks and Joey Power

- Theatrical release poster
- Directed by: Hannah Marks; Joey Power
- Written by: Hannah Marks; Joey Power
- Produced by: Jordan Beckerman; Sean Glover; Jordan Yale Levine; Michael J. Rothstein
- Starring: Jeremy Allen White; Maika Monroe; DeRon Horton; Sasha Lane; Dean Winters; Joe Keery; Gina Gershon; Marisa Tomei
- Cinematography: Sandra Valde-Hansen
- Edited by: Gorden Grinberg
- Music by: Xander Singh
- Production companies: Yale Productions; WYSJ Media; The Exchange
- Distributed by: Good Deed Entertainment
- Release dates: March 9, 2018 (SXSW); October 12, 2018 (United States)
- Running time: 95 minutes
- Country: United States
- Language: English

After Everything (also known as Eternal Love (UK); originally titled Shotgun) is a 2018 American comedy-drama film written and directed by Hannah Marks and Joey Power. It stars Jeremy Allen White, Maika Monroe, DeRon Horton, Sasha Lane, Dean Winters, Gina Gershon, Joe Keery and Marisa Tomei. When Elliot, a brash 23-year-old living carefree in New York City, meets the sensible Mia and receives a damning diagnosis all in the same week, his world is turned completely upside down. But as their love blossoms amidst the chaos of his treatment, they discover that Elliot's illness is not the real test of their relationship – it's everything else.

It had its world premiere on South by Southwest on March 9, 2018. It was released on October 12, 2018, by Good Deed Entertainment, to positive critical reception.

== Plot ==
23-year-old Elliott is diagnosed with Ewing sarcoma, a rare bone cancer that he initially mistakes for a venereal disease. On their first date, he reveals his diagnosis to Mia, a customer at the New York City sandwich shop he works at with whom he connected in a subway station. Elliott and Mia’s relationship grows and they begin dating.

Mia accompanies Elliott to New Jersey to disclose his illness to his parents. She stands by him as his physical and mental health deteriorates due to his chemotherapy treatments, even quitting her marketing job to remain by his side. Meanwhile, Elliott grows apart from Nico, his best friend and roommate. Elliott’s cancer does not respond to chemotherapy, forcing him to undergo surgery with only a limited chance of success. Elliott and Mia complete activities on Elliott’s bucket list and decide to marry in front of a justice of the peace before his operation.

Elliott survives the surgery and his cancer goes into remission. Four months later, he and Mia have moved in together. Elliott takes classes in software design, while Mia has begun a new job that she finds more fulfilling than her previous one. After an initial period of happiness, they gradually begin to experience problems in their marriage as their familiarity with one-another grows. They visit Mia’s mother, Tracy, who casts doubt on the future of their marriage. Mia skips Elliott’s cancer screening in order to give a presentation at work, much to his chagrin. Elliott begins attending group therapy sessions with other cancer survivors, but continues to grow distant from Mia. He begins spending more time with Nico and flirts with other women, while Mia begins to develop feelings for her boss, David.

One evening, Elliott accidentally calls Mia and she overhears that he and Nico are at a bar with other women. Mia confronts him and begs him to help repair their relationship, but Elliott tells her that he does not believe they would have married at all if it had not been for his cancer operation. Devastated, Mia is comforted by David, and they kiss.

One month later, Elliott and Mia are separated. Elliott has moved out of their apartment and given up on software design, returning to his job at the sandwich shop. Mia decides not to pursue a relationship with David, but struggles to restart her dating life during her and Elliott's separation. Elliott also finds himself unable to have success with other women. He calls her and they agree to meet to discuss the future of their marriage. Elliott apologizes for his words outside the bar and expresses a desire to try again, but Mia asks for a divorce, saying that while she still loves him, she is no longer certain that he is the right person for her. Elliott agrees, but asks to remain friends.

Afterwards, they kiss and attempt to part ways, but find that they are both headed to the same subway station, allowing them more time to reminisce.

== Cast ==
- Jeremy Allen White as Elliott
- Maika Monroe as Mia
- DeRon Horton as Nico
- Sasha Lane as Lindsay
- Joe Keery as Chris
- Gina Gershon as Tracy
- Bill Sage as Paul
- Marisa Tomei as Dr. Lisa Harden
- Dean Winters as Blake
- Olivia Luccardi as Janelle
- Callie Thorne as Celia
- Rya Kihlstedt as Rebecca
- Marlyne Barrett as Dr. Beatty
- Peter Vack as Young Cancer Survivor
- Sendhil Ramamurthy as David
- Lizzy DeClement as Vanessa
- Ana Isabelle as Eliott's Ex
- Christina Scherer as Jenny

== Production ==
In March 2017, it was announced Jeremy Allen White and Maika Monroe, had been cast in the film, with Hannah Marks and Joey Power directing from a screenplay they wrote. Jordan Yale Levine, Jordan Beckerman, Michael J. Rothstein, Ash Christian, Sean Glover and Wei Wang are producing the project, under their Yale Productions and WYSJ Media banners, respectively. In April 2017, Sasha Lane joined the cast of the film.

=== Filming ===
Principal photography began on April 3, 2017, in New York City.

== Release ==
The film had its world premiere at South by Southwest on March 9, 2018. Shortly after, Good Deed Entertainment acquired distribution rights to the film. It was released on October 12, 2018.

=== Critical reception ===
After Everything received positive reviews. On Rotten Tomatoes, it has an 84% approval rating based on 19 reviews, with an average rating of 7.3/10. On Metacritic, the film scored 67 out of 100, based on 11 critics, indicating "generally favorable" reviews.
