= Value theory =

Systematic study of values

Value theory, also called axiology, studies the nature, sources, and types of values. It is a branch of philosophy and an interdisciplinary field closely associated with social sciences such as anthropology, economics, psychology, and sociology.

Value is the worth of something, usually understood as covering both positive and negative degrees corresponding to the terms good and bad. Values influence many human endeavors related to emotion, decision-making, and action. Value theorists distinguish various types of values, like the contrast between intrinsic and instrumental value. An entity has intrinsic value if it is good in itself, independent of external factors. An entity has instrumental value if it is useful as a means leading to other good things. Other classifications focus on the type of benefit, including economic, moral, political, aesthetic, and religious values. Further categorizations distinguish absolute values from values that are relative to something else.

Diverse schools of thought debate the nature and origins of values. Value realists state that values exist as objective features of reality. Anti-realists reject this, with some seeing values as subjective human creations and others viewing value statements as meaningless. Regarding the sources of value, hedonists argue that only pleasure has intrinsic value, whereas desire theorists discuss desires as the ultimate source of value. Perfectionism, another approach, emphasizes the cultivation of characteristic human abilities. Value pluralism identifies diverse sources of intrinsic value, raising the issue of whether values belonging to different types are comparable. Value theorists employ various methods of inquiry, ranging from reliance on intuitions and thought experiments to the analysis of language, description of first-person experience, observation of behavior, and surveys.

Value theory is related to various fields. Ethics focuses primarily on normative concepts of right behavior, whereas value theory explores evaluative concepts about what is good. In economics, theories of value are frameworks to assess and explain the economic value of commodities. Sociology and anthropology examine values as aspects of societies and cultures, reflecting dominant preferences and beliefs. In psychology, values are typically understood as abstract motivational goals that shape an individual's personality. The roots of value theory lie in antiquity as reflections on the highest good that humans should pursue. Diverse traditions contributed to this area of thought during the medieval and early modern periods, but it was only established as a distinct discipline in the late 19th and early 20th centuries.

== Definition ==
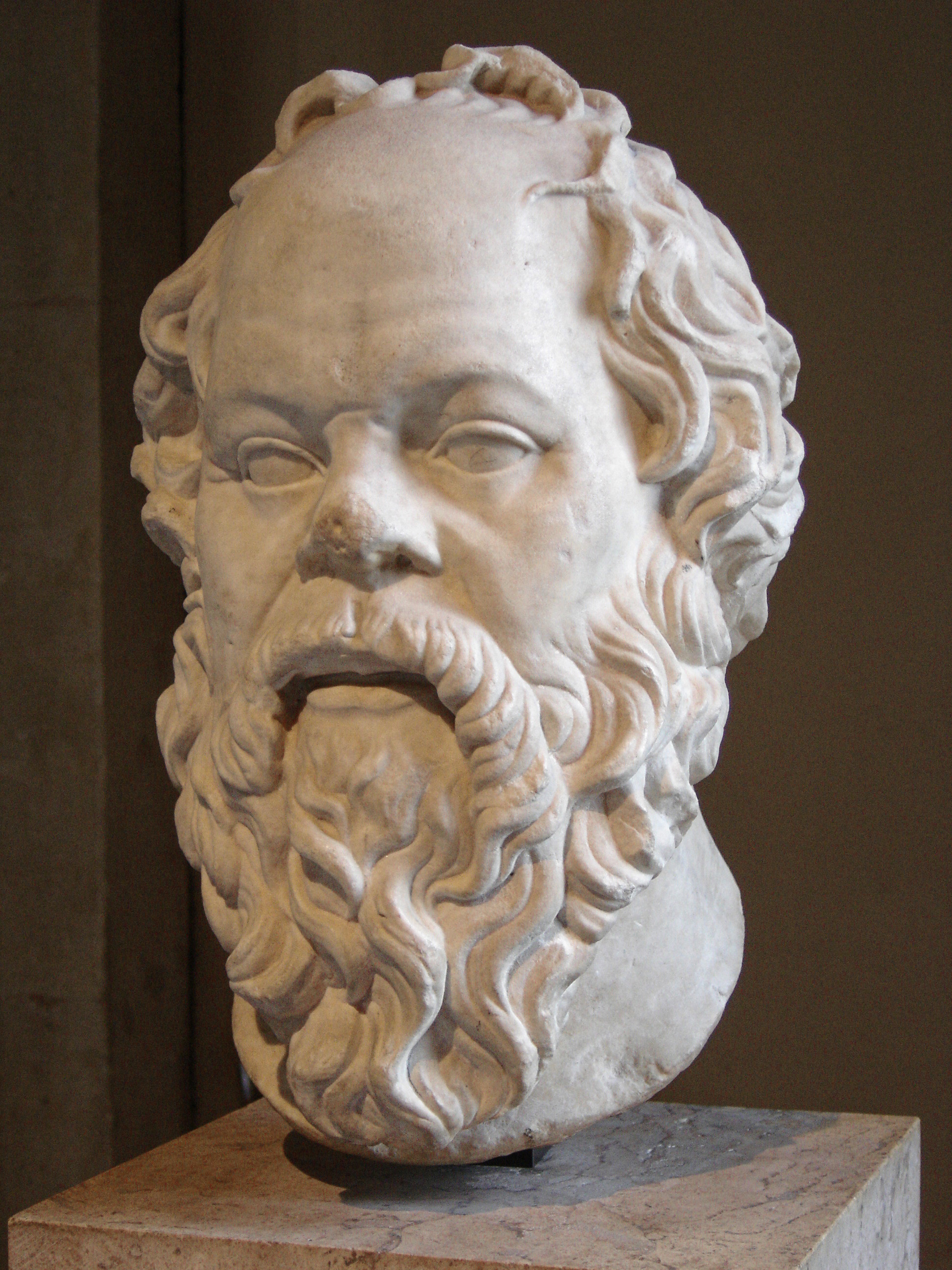
Even though early contributions to value theory were made in antiquity by philosophers such as Socrates, this area of thought was only conceived as a distinct discipline in the late 19th and early 20th centuries.

Value theory, also known as axiology and theory of values, is the systematic study of values. As a branch of philosophy, it examines which things are good and what it means for something to be good. It distinguishes different types of values and explores how they can be measured and compared. This field also studies whether values are a fundamental aspect of reality and how they influence phenomena such as emotion, desire, decision, and action. Value theory is relevant to many human endeavors because values are guiding principles that underlie the political, economic, scientific, and personal spheres. It analyzes and evaluates phenomena such as well-being, utility, beauty, human life, knowledge, wisdom, freedom, love, and justice.

The precise definition of value theory is debated and some theorists rely on alternative characterizations. In a broad sense, value theory is a catch-all label that encompasses all philosophical disciplines studying evaluative and normative topics. According to this view, value theory is one of the main branches of philosophy and includes ethics, aesthetics, social philosophy, political philosophy, and philosophy of religion. A similar broad characterization sees value theory as a multidisciplinary area of inquiry that integrates research from fields like sociology, anthropology, psychology, and economics alongside philosophy. In a narrow sense, value theory is a subdiscipline of ethics that is particularly relevant to the school of consequentialism since it determines how to assess the value of consequences.

The word axiology has its origin in the ancient Greek terms ἄξιος (axios, meaning 'worthy' or 'of value') and λόγος (logos, meaning 'study' or 'theory of'). Even though the roots of value theory reach back to the ancient period, this area of thought was only conceived as a distinct discipline in the late 19th and early 20th centuries, when the term axiology was coined. The terms value theory and axiology are usually used as synonyms, but some philosophers distinguish between them. According to one characterization, axiology is a subfield of value theory that limits itself to theories about which things are valuable and how valuable they are. (Note: Another view sees axiology as the wider field and restricts value theory to questions concerning the nature of value.) The term timology is an older and less common synonym.

== Value ==
Value is the worth, usefulness, or merit of something. (Note: The term value has other meanings as well, such as the value of a mathematical variable expressing the information or quantity that this variable carries. Value theory is only interested in the evaluative sense of the term about being good or bad in a certain respect.) Value theorists examine the expressions used to describe and compare values, called evaluative terms. They are further interested in the types or categories of values. The proposed classifications overlap and are based on factors like the source, beneficiary, and function of the value.

=== Evaluative terms ===
Values are expressed through evaluative terms. For example, the words good, best, great, and excellent convey positive values, whereas words like bad and terrible indicate negative values. Value theorists distinguish between thin and thick evaluative terms. Thin evaluative terms, like good and bad, express pure evaluations without any additional descriptive content. (Note: Some philosophers, such as G. E. M. Anscombe, Philippa Foot, and Iris Murdoch, have argued that there are no pure thin evaluative terms.) They contrast with thick evaluative terms, like courageous and cruel, which provide more information by expressing other qualities, such as character traits, in addition to the evaluation. Values are often understood as degrees that cover positive and negative magnitudes corresponding to good and bad. The term value is sometimes restricted to positive degrees to contrast with the term disvalue for negative degrees. The words better and worse are used to compare degrees, but it is controversial whether a quantitative comparison is always possible. Evaluation is the assessment or measurement of value, often employed to compare the benefits of different options to find the most advantageous choice.

Evaluative terms are sometimes distinguished from normative or deontic terms. Normative or deontic terms, like right, wrong, and obligation, prescribe actions or other states by expressing what ought to be done or what is required. Evaluative terms have a wider scope because they are not limited to what people can control or are responsible for. For instance, involuntary events like digestion and earthquakes can have a positive or negative value even if they are not right or wrong in a strict sense. Despite the distinction, evaluative and normative concepts are closely related. For example, the value of the consequences of an action may influence its normative status—whether the action is right or wrong.

=== Types ===
==== Intrinsic and instrumental ====
An entity has intrinsic value if it is good in itself. An entity has instrumental value if it leads to other good things.

Instrumental values can form chains with intrinsic values as their endpoints.

A thing has intrinsic or final value if it is good in itself or good for its own sake, independent of external factors or outcomes. A thing has extrinsic or instrumental value if it is useful or leads to other good things, serving as a means to bring about a desirable end. For example, tools like microwaves or money have instrumental value due to the useful functions they perform. In some cases, the thing produced this way has itself instrumental value, like when using money to buy a microwave. This can result in a chain of instrumentally valuable things in which each link gets its value by causing the following link. Intrinsically valuable things stand at the endpoint of these chains and ground the value of all the preceding links.

One suggestion to distinguish between intrinsic and instrumental value, proposed by G. E. Moore, relies on a thought experiment that imagines the valuable thing in isolation from everything else. In such a situation, purely instrumentally valuable things lose their value since they serve no purpose while purely intrinsically valuable things remain valuable. (Note: Critics of this thought experiment argue that it depends on controversial assumptions about the nature of intrinsic value and is not applicable to all cases.) According to a common view, pleasure is one of the sources of intrinsic value. Other suggested sources include desire satisfaction, virtue, life, health, beauty, freedom, and knowledge.

A thing can have both intrinsic and instrumental value if it is good in itself and leads to other good things.

A thing can have both positive and negative consequences. Its total instrumental value is the value balance of all its consequences.

Intrinsic and instrumental value are not exclusive categories. As a result, a thing can have both intrinsic and instrumental value if it is both good in itself while also leading to other good things. In a similar sense, a thing can have different instrumental values at the same time, both positive and negative ones. This is the case if some of its consequences are good while others are bad. The total instrumental value of a thing is the value balance of all its consequences.

Because instrumental value depends on other values, it is an open question whether it should be understood as a value in a strict sense. For example, the overall value of a chain of causes leading to an intrinsically valuable thing remains the same if instrumentally valuable links are added or removed without affecting the intrinsically valuable thing. The observation that the overall value does not change is sometimes used as an argument that the things added or removed do not have value.

Traditionally, value theorists have used the terms intrinsic value and final value interchangeably, just like the terms extrinsic value and instrumental value. This practice has been questioned in the 20th century based on the idea that they are similar but not identical concepts. According to this view, a thing has intrinsic value if the source of its value is an intrinsic property, meaning that the value does not depend on how the thing is related to other objects. Extrinsic value, by contrast, depends on external relations. This view sees instrumental value as one type of extrinsic value based on external causal relations. At the same time, it allows that there are other types of non-instrumental extrinsic value that result from external non-causal relations. Final value is understood as what is valued for its own sake, independent of whether intrinsic or extrinsic properties are responsible. (Note: In the social sciences, some works rely on the concept of relational value to understand the value of the relationship between humans and nature. According to this view, relational value is a unique type of value that is neither intrinsic nor instrumental.)

==== Absolute and relative ====
Another distinction relies on the contrast between absolute and relative value. Absolute value, also called value simpliciter, is a form of unconditional value. A thing has relative value if its value is relative to other things or limited to certain considerations or viewpoints.

One form of relative value is restricted to the type of an entity, expressed in sentences like "That is a good knife" or "Jack is a good thief". This form is known as attributive goodness since the word "good" modifies the meaning of another term. To be attributively good as a certain type means to possess qualities characteristic of that type. For instance, a good knife is sharp and a good thief has the skill of stealing without getting caught. Attributive goodness contrasts with predicative goodness. The sentence "Pleasure is good" is an example since the word good is used as a predicate to talk about the unqualified value of pleasure. Attributive and predicative goodness can accompany each other, but this is not always the case. For instance, being a good thief is not necessarily a good thing.

Another type of relative value restricts goodness to a specific person. Known as personal value, (Note: Prudential value is a closely related concept signifying what is good for a person.) it expresses what benefits a particular person, promotes their welfare, or is in their interest. For example, a poem written by a child may have personal value for the parents even if the poem lacks value for others. Impersonal value, by contrast, is good in general without restriction to any specific person or viewpoint. Some philosophers, like Moore, reject the existence of personal values, holding that all values are impersonal. Others have proposed theories about the relation between personal and impersonal value. The agglomerative theory says that impersonal value is nothing but the sum of all personal values. Another view understands impersonal value as a specific type of personal value taken from the perspective of the universe as a whole.

Agent-relative value is sometimes contrasted with personal value as another person-specific limitation of the evaluative outlook. Agent-relative values affect moral considerations about what a person is responsible for or guilty of. For example, if Mei promises to pick Pedro up from the airport then an agent-relative value obligates Mei to drive to the airport. This obligation is in place even if it does not benefit Mei, in which case there is an agent-relative value without a personal value. In consequentialism, (Note: Consequentialism is a theory in normative ethics. It says that whether an act is right depends on its consequences.) agent-relative values are often discussed in relation to ethical dilemmas. One dilemma revolves around the question of whether an individual should murder an innocent person if this prevents the murder of two innocent people by a different perpetrator. The agent-neutral perspective tends to affirm this idea since one murder is preferable to two. The agent-relative perspective tends to reject this conclusion, arguing that the initial murder should be avoided since it negatively impacts the agent-relative value of the individual committing it.

Traditionally, most value theorists see absolute value as the main topic of value theory and focus their attention on this type. Nonetheless, some philosophers, like Peter Geach and Philippa Foot, have argued that the concept of absolute value by itself is meaningless and should be understood as one form of relative value.

==== Other distinctions ====
Other categorizations of values have been proposed following diverse classification principles without a single approach widely accepted by all theorists. Some focus on the types of entities that have value. They include distinct categories for entities like individuals, groups, society, the environment, and inert things. Another subdivision pays attention to the type of benefit involved and encompasses material, economic, moral, social, political, aesthetic, and religious values. Classifications by the beneficiary of the value distinguish between self- and other-oriented values.

A historically influential approach identifies three spheres of value: truth, goodness, and beauty. (Note: In scholastic philosophy, they are known as transcendentals and considered fundamental aspects of being.) For example, the neo-Kantian philosopher Wilhelm Windelband characterizes them as the highest goals of consciousness, with thought aiming at truth, will aiming at goodness, and emotion aiming at beauty. A similar view, proposed by the Chinese philosopher Zhang Dainian, says that the value of truth belongs to knowledge, the value of goodness belongs to behavior, and the value of beauty belongs to art. This three-fold distinction also plays a central role in the philosophies of Franz Brentano and Jürgen Habermas. Other suggested types of values include objective, subjective, potential, actual, contingent, necessary, inherent, and constitutive values.

== Schools of thought ==
=== Realism and anti-realism ===
Value realism is the view that values have mind-independent existence. (Note: If this position limits itself to the moral realm, it is known as moral realism, an influential position in ethics.) This means that objective facts determine what has value, irrespective of subjective beliefs and preferences. According to this view, the evaluative statement "That act is bad" is as objectively true or false as the empirical statement "That act causes distress".

Realists often analyze values as properties of valuable things. For example, stating that kindness is good asserts that kindness possesses the property of goodness. Value realists disagree about what type of property is involved. Naturalists say that value is a natural property. Natural properties, like size and shape, can be known through empirical observation and are studied by the natural sciences. Non-naturalists reject this view but agree that values are real. They say that values differ significantly from empirical properties and belong to another domain of reality. According to one view, they are known through rational or emotional intuition rather than empirical observation.

Another disagreement among realists is about whether the entity carrying the value is a concrete individual or a state of affairs. For instance, the name "Bill" refers to an individual while the sentence "Bill is pleased" refers to a state of affairs, which combines the individual "Bill" with the property "pleased". Some value theorists hold that the value is a property directly of Bill while others contend that it is a property of the state of affairs that Bill is pleased. This distinction affects various disputes in value theory. In some cases, a value is intrinsic according to one view and extrinsic according to the other.

Value realism contrasts with anti-realism, which comes in various forms. In its strongest version, anti-realism rejects the existence of values in any form, claiming that value statements are meaningless. (Note: This view is sometimes called radical nihilism.) There are various intermediate views between this position and realism. Some anti-realists accept that value claims have meaning but deny that they have a truth value, (Note: This means that value statements are neither true nor false.) a position known as non-cognitivism. For example, emotivists say that value claims express emotional attitudes, similar to how exclamations like "Yay!" or "Boo!" express emotions rather than stating facts. (Note: Projectivism is a closely related view holding that values are projections of emotions onto the world.)

Cognitivists contend that value statements have a truth value, meaning that sentences like "knowledge is intrinsically good" are either true or false. Following this view, error theorists defend anti-realism by stating that all value statements are false because there are no values. Another view accepts the existence of values but denies that they are mind-independent. According to this view, the mental states of individuals determine whether an object has value, for instance, because individuals desire it. A similar view is defended by existentialists like Jean-Paul Sartre, who argued that values are human creations that endow the world with meaning. Subjectivist theories say that values are relative to each subject, whereas more objectivist outlooks hold that values depend on mind in general rather than on the individual mind.

A different position accepts that values are mind-independent but holds that they are reducible to other facts, meaning that they are not a fundamental part of reality. One form of reductionism maintains that a thing is good if it is fitting to favor this thing, regardless of whether people actually favor it, a position known as the fitting-attitude theory of value. The buck-passing account, a closely related reductive view, argues that a thing is valuable if people have reasons to treat the thing in certain ways. These reasons come from other features of the valuable thing. According to some views, reductionism is a form of realism, but the strongest form of realism says that value is a fundamental part of reality and cannot be reduced to other aspects.

=== Sources of value ===
Various theories about the sources of value have been proposed. They aim to clarify what kinds of things are intrinsically good. The historically influential theory of hedonism (Note: This view is sometimes called axiological hedonism to distinguish it from related theories under this label.) states that how people feel is the only source of value. More specifically, it says that pleasure is the only intrinsic good and pain is the only intrinsic evil. According to this view, everything else only has instrumental value to the extent that it leads to pleasure or pain, including knowledge, health, and justice. Hedonists usually understand the term pleasure in a broad sense that covers all kinds of enjoyable experiences, including bodily pleasures of food and sex as well as more intellectual or abstract pleasures, like the joy of reading a book or happiness about a friend's promotion. Pleasurable experiences come in degrees, and hedonists usually associate their intensity and duration with the magnitude of value they have. (Note: Qualitative hedonists argue that the quality of pleasure is an additional factor influencing its value besides intensity and duration. Some distinguish higher pleasures of the mind, like enjoying fine art and philosophy, from lower pleasures of the body, like enjoying food and drink.)

Many hedonists identify pleasure and pain as symmetric opposites, meaning that the value of pleasure balances out the disvalue of pain if they have the same intensity. However, some hedonists reject this symmetry and give more weight to avoiding pain than to experiencing pleasure. Although it is widely accepted that pleasure is valuable, the hedonist claim that it is the only source of value is controversial. Welfarism, a closely related theory, understands well-being as the only source of value. Well-being is what is ultimately good for a person, which can include other aspects besides pleasure, such as health, personal growth, meaningful relationships, and a sense of purpose in life.

Desire theories offer a slightly different account, stating that desire satisfaction (Note: Some theorists use the terms desire satisfaction and desire fulfillment as synonyms while others distinguish between them. According to the latter view, desire satisfaction is a subjective state involving a possibly false belief that a desire is satisfied. Desire fulfillment is an objective state present if the desired outcome actually exists, even if the person does not know about it.) is the only source of value. (Note: Some desire theories aim to explain goodness in general while others restrict themselves to goodness for a person.) This theory overlaps with hedonism because many people desire pleasure and because desire satisfaction is often accompanied by pleasure. Nonetheless, there are important differences: people desire a variety of other things as well, like knowledge, achievement, and respect; additionally, desire satisfaction may not always result in pleasure. Some desire theorists hold that value is a property of desire satisfaction itself, while others say that it is a property of the objects that satisfy a desire. One debate in desire theory concerns whether every desire is a source of value. For example, if a person has a false belief that money makes them happy, it is questionable whether the satisfaction of their desire for money is a source of value. To address this consideration, some desire theorists say that a desire can only provide value if a fully informed and rational person would have it, thereby excluding misguided desires from being a source of value.

Perfectionism identifies the realization of human nature and the cultivation of characteristic human abilities as the source of intrinsic goodness. It covers capacities and character traits belonging to the bodily, emotional, volitional, cognitive, social, artistic, and religious fields. Perfectionists disagree about which human excellences are the most important. Many are pluralistic in recognizing a diverse array of human excellences, such as knowledge, creativity, health, beauty, free agency, and moral virtues like benevolence and courage. According to one suggestion, there are two main fields of human goods: theoretical abilities responsible for understanding the world and practical abilities responsible for interacting with it. Some perfectionists provide an ideal characterization of human nature as the goal of human flourishing, holding that human excellences are those aspects that promote the realization of this goal. This view is exemplified in Aristotle's focus on rationality as the nature and ideal state of human beings. Non-humanistic versions extend perfectionism to the natural world in general, arguing that excellence as a source of intrinsic value is not limited to the human realm.

=== Monism and pluralism ===
Monist theories of value assert that there is only a single source of intrinsic value. They agree that various things have value but maintain that all fundamentally good things belong to the same type. For example, hedonists hold that nothing but pleasure has intrinsic value, while desire theorists argue that desire satisfaction is the only source of fundamental goodness. Pluralists reject this view, contending that a simple single-value system is too crude to capture the complexity of the sphere of values. They say that diverse sources of value exist independently of one another, each contributing to the overall value of the world.

One motivation for value pluralism is the observation that people value diverse types of things, including happiness, friendship, success, and knowledge. This diversity becomes particularly prominent when people face difficult decisions between competing values, such as choosing between friendship and career success. In such cases, value pluralists can argue that the different items have different types of values. Since monists accept only one source of intrinsic value, they may provide a different explanation by proposing that some of the valuable items only have instrumental value but lack intrinsic value.

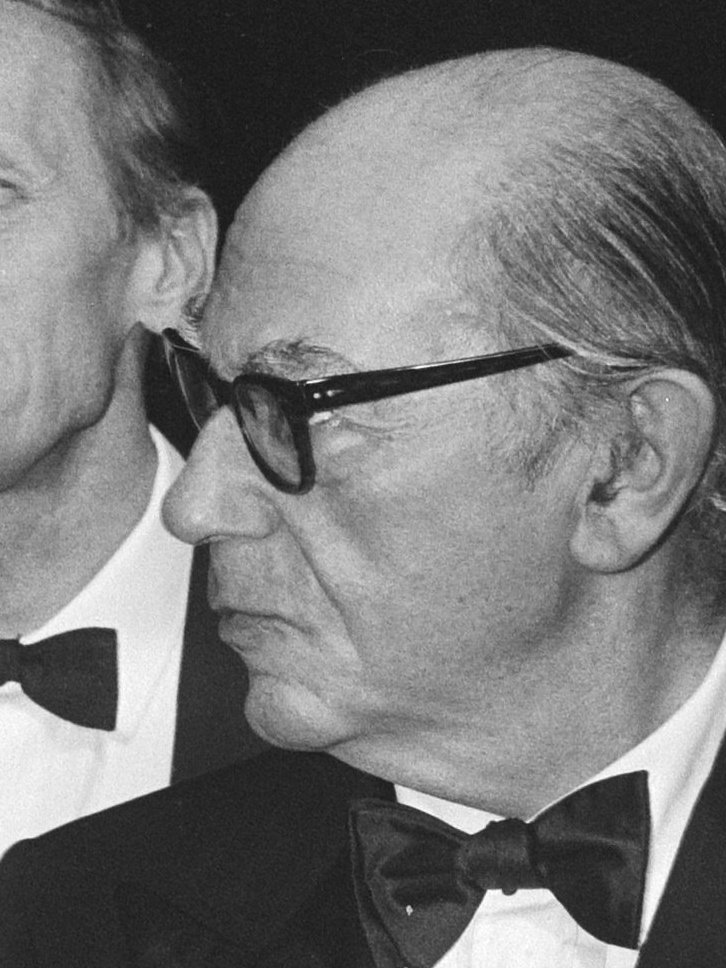
Isaiah Berlin argued that conflicts between different types of values, like liberty and equality, cannot always be resolved.

Pluralists have proposed various accounts of how their view affects practical decisions. Rational decisions often rely on value comparisons to determine which course of action should be pursued. Some pluralists discuss a hierarchy of values reflecting the relative importance and weight of different value types to help people promote higher values when faced with difficult choices. For example, philosopher Max Scheler ranks values based on how enduring and fulfilling they are into the levels of pleasure, utility, vitality, culture, and holiness. He asserts that people should not promote lower values, like pleasure, if this comes at the expense of higher values. (Note: In some places, Scheler talks about four levels instead of five: sensory, vital, spiritual, and holy.)

Radical pluralists reject this approach, putting more emphasis on diversity by holding that different types of values are not comparable with each other. This means that each value type is unique, making it impossible to determine which one is superior. (Note: More specifically, this implies that one value is not better than the other, not worse than the other, and not as good as the other.) Some value theorists use radical pluralism to argue that value conflicts are inevitable, that the gain of one value cannot always compensate for the loss of another, and that some ethical dilemmas are irresolvable. For example, philosopher Isaiah Berlin applied this idea to the values of liberty and equality, arguing that a gain in one cannot make up for a loss in the other. Similarly, philosopher Joseph Raz said that it is often impossible to compare the values of career paths, like when choosing between becoming a lawyer or a clarinetist. The terms incomparability and incommensurability are often used as synonyms in this context. However, philosophers like Ruth Chang distinguish them. According to this view, incommensurability means that there is no common measure to quantify values of different types. Incommensurable values may or may not be comparable. If they are, it is possible to say that one value is better than another, but it is not possible to quantify how much better it is.

=== Others ===
Several controversies surround the question of how the intrinsic value of a whole is determined by the intrinsic values of its parts. According to the additivity principle, the intrinsic value of a whole is simply the sum of the intrinsic values of its parts. For example, if a virtuous person becomes happy then the intrinsic value of the happiness is simply added to the intrinsic value of the virtue, thereby increasing the overall value.

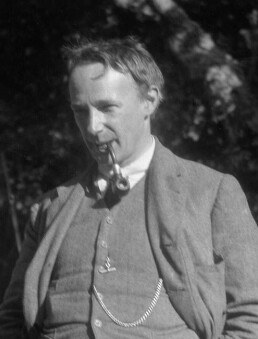
G. E. Moore introduced the idea of organic unities to describe entities whose total intrinsic value is not the sum of the intrinsic values of their parts.

Various counterexamples to the additivity principle have been proposed, suggesting that the relation between parts and wholes is more complex. For instance, Immanuel Kant argued that if a vicious person becomes happy, this happiness, though good in itself, does not increase the overall value. On the contrary, it makes things worse, according to Kant, since viciousness should not be rewarded with happiness. This situation is known as an organic unity—a whole whose intrinsic value differs from the sum of the intrinsic values of its parts. Another perspective, called holism about value, asserts that the intrinsic value of a thing depends on its context. Holists can argue that happiness has positive intrinsic value in the context of virtue and negative intrinsic value in the context of vice. Atomists reject this view, saying that intrinsic value is context-independent.

Theories of value aggregation provide concrete principles for calculating the overall value of an outcome based on how positively or negatively each individual is affected by it. For example, if a government implements a new policy that affects some people positively and others negatively, theories of value aggregation can be used to determine whether the overall value of the policy is positive or negative. Axiological utilitarianism accepts the additivity principle, saying that the total value is simply the sum of all individual values. Axiological egalitarians are not only interested in the sum total of value but also in how the values are distributed. They argue that an outcome with a balanced advantage distribution is better than an outcome where some benefit a lot while others benefit little, even if the two outcomes have the same sum total. Axiological prioritarians are particularly concerned with the benefits of individuals who are worse off. They say that providing advantages to people in need has more value than providing the same advantages to others.

Another debate addresses the meaning of life, investigating whether life or existence as a whole has a higher meaning or purpose. Naturalist views argue that the meaning of life is found within the physical world, either as objective values that are true for everyone or as subjective values that vary according to individual preferences. Suggested fields where humans find meaning include exercising freedom, committing oneself to a cause, practicing altruism, engaging in positive social relationships, or pursuing personal happiness. Supernaturalists, by contrast, propose that meaning lies beyond the natural world. For example, various religions teach that God created the world for a higher purpose, imbuing existence with meaning. A related outlook argues that immortal souls serve as sources of meaning by being connected to a transcendent reality and evolving spiritually. Existential nihilists reject both naturalist and supernaturalist explanations by asserting that there is no higher purpose. They suggest that life is meaningless, with the consequence that there is no higher reason to continue living and that all efforts, achievements, happiness, and suffering are ultimately pointless.

Formal axiology is a theory of value initially developed by philosopher Robert S. Hartman. This approach treats axiology as a formal science, akin to logic and mathematics. It uses axioms to give an abstract definition of value, understanding it not as a property of things but as a property of concepts. Value measures the extent to which an entity fulfills its concept. For example, a good car has all the desirable qualities of cars, like a reliable engine and effective brakes, whereas a bad car lacks many. Formal axiology distinguishes between three fundamental value types: intrinsic values apply to people; extrinsic values apply to things, actions, and social roles; systemic values apply to conceptual constructs. Formal axiology examines how these value types form a hierarchy and how they can be measured.

== Methods ==
Value theorists employ various methods to conduct their inquiries, justify theories, and measure values. Intuitionists rely on intuitions to assess evaluative claims. In this context, an intuition is an immediate apprehension or understanding of a self-evident claim, meaning that its truth can be assessed without inferring it from another observation. Value theorists often rely on thought experiments to gain this type of understanding. Thought experiments are imagined scenarios that exemplify philosophical problems. Philosophers use counterfactual reasoning to evaluate possible consequences and gain insight into underlying problems. For example, philosopher Robert Nozick imagines an experience machine that can virtually simulate an ideal life. Based on his contention that people would not want to spend the rest of their lives in this pleasurable simulation, Nozick argues against the hedonist claim that pleasure is the only source of intrinsic value. According to him, the thought experiment shows that the value of an authentic connection to reality is not reducible to pleasure. (Note: Moore's isolation test is another influential thought experiment about intrinsic value.)

Phenomenologists provide a detailed first-person description of the experience of values. They closely examine emotional experiences, ranging from desire, interest, and preference to feelings in the form of love and hate. However, they do not limit their inquiry to these phenomena, asserting that values permeate experience at large. A key aspect of the phenomenological method is to suspend preconceived ideas and judgments to understand the essence of experiences as they present themselves to consciousness.

The analysis of concepts and ordinary language is another method of inquiry. By examining terms and sentences used to talk about values, value theorists aim to clarify their meanings, uncover crucial distinctions, and formulate arguments for and against axiological theories. For instance, a prominent dispute between naturalists and non-naturalists hinges on the conceptual analysis of the term good, in particular, whether its meaning can be analyzed through natural terms, like pleasure. (Note: This problem is the main topic of Moore's controversial open-question argument.)

The Schwartz theory of basic human values is an instrument to measure value priorities. It arranges different values in a circle, using angular distance between values to indicate how compatible they are.

In the social sciences, value theorists face the challenge of measuring the evaluative outlook of individuals and groups. Specifically, they aim to determine personal value hierarchies, for example, whether a person gives more weight to truth than to moral goodness or beauty. They distinguish between direct and indirect measurement methods. Direct methods involve asking people straightforward questions about what things they value and which value priorities they have. This approach assumes that people are aware of their evaluative outlook and able to articulate it accurately. Indirect methods do not share this assumption, asserting instead that values guide behavior and choices on an unconscious level. Consequently, they observe how people decide and act, seeking to infer the underlying value attitudes responsible for picking one course of action rather than another.

Various catalogs or scales of values have been proposed in psychology and related social sciences to measure value priorities. The Rokeach Value Survey considers a total of 36 values divided into two groups: instrumental values, like honesty and capability, which serve as means to promote terminal values, such as freedom and family security. It asks participants to rank the values based on their impact on the participants' lives, aiming to understand the relative importance assigned to each of them. The Schwartz theory of basic human values is a modification of the Rokeach Value Survey that seeks to provide a more cross-cultural and universal assessment. It arranges the values in a circular manner to reflect that neighboring values are compatible with each other, such as openness to change and self-enhancement, while values on opposing sides may conflict with each other, such as openness to change and conservation.

== In various fields ==
=== Ethics ===
Ethics and value theory are overlapping fields of inquiry. Ethics studies moral phenomena, focusing on how people should act or which behaviors are morally right. Value theory investigates the nature, sources, and types of values in general. Some philosophers understand value theory as a subdiscipline of ethics. This is based on the idea that what people should do is affected by value considerations but not necessarily limited to them. Another view sees ethics as a subdiscipline of value theory. This outlook follows the idea that ethics is concerned with moral values affecting what people can control, whereas value theory examines a broader range of values, including those beyond anyone's control. Some perspectives contrast ethics and value theory, asserting that the normative concepts examined by ethics are distinct from the evaluative concepts examined by value theory. Axiological ethics is a subfield of ethics examining the nature and role of values from a moral perspective, with particular interest in determining which ends are worth pursuing.

The ethical theory of consequentialism combines the perspectives of ethics and value theory, asserting that the rightness of an action depends on the value of its consequences. Consequentialists compare possible courses of action, saying that people should follow the one leading to the best overall consequences. The overall consequences of an action are the totality of its effects, or how it impacts the world by starting a causal chain of events that would not have occurred otherwise. Distinct versions of consequentialism rely on different theories of the sources of value. Classical utilitarianism, a prominent form of consequentialism, says that moral actions produce the greatest amount of pleasure for the greatest number of people. It combines a consequentialist outlook on right action with a hedonist outlook on pleasure as the only source of intrinsic value.

=== Economics ===
Economics is a social science studying how goods and services are produced, distributed, and consumed, both from the perspective of individual agents and societal systems. Economists view evaluations as a driving force underlying economic activity. They use the notion of economic value and related evaluative concepts to understand decision-making processes, resource allocation, and the impact of policies. The economic value or benefit of a commodity is the advantage it provides to an economic agent, often measured in terms of what people are willing to pay for it.

Economic theories of value are frameworks to explain how economic value arises and which factors influence it. Prominent frameworks include the classical labor theory of value and the neo-classical marginal theory of value. The labor theory, initially developed by the economists Adam Smith and David Ricardo, distinguishes between use value—the utility or satisfaction a commodity provides—and exchange value—the proportion at which one commodity can be exchanged with another. It focuses on exchange value, which it says is determined by the amount of labor required to produce the commodity. In its simplest form, it directly correlates exchange value to labor time. For example, if the time needed to hunt a deer is twice the time needed to hunt a beaver then one deer is worth two beavers. The philosopher Karl Marx extended the labor theory of value in various ways. He introduced the concept of surplus value, which goes beyond the time and resources invested to explain how capitalists can profit from the labor of their employees.

The marginal theory of value focuses on consumption rather than production. It says that the utility of a commodity is the source of its value. Specifically, it is interested in marginal utility, the additional satisfaction gained from consuming one more unit of the commodity. Marginal utility often diminishes if many units have already been consumed, leading to a decrease in the exchange value of commodities that are abundantly available. Both the labor theory and the marginal theory were later challenged by the Sraffian theory of value, which considers diverse forms of production costs, including but not limited to the quantity of labor.

=== Sociology ===
Sociology studies social behavior, relationships, institutions, and society at large. In their analyses and explanations of these phenomena, some sociologists use the concept of values to understand issues like social cohesion and conflict, the norms and practices people follow, and collective action. They usually understand values as subjective attitudes possessed by individuals and shared in social groups. According to this view, values are beliefs or priorities about goals worth pursuing that guide people to act in certain ways. For example, societies that value education may invest substantial resources to ensure high-quality schooling. This subjective conception of values as aspects of individuals and social groups contrasts with the objective conceptions of values more prominent in economics, which understand values as aspects of commodities.

Shared values can help unite people in the pursuit of a common cause, fostering social cohesion. Value differences, by contrast, may divide people into antagonistic groups that promote conflicting projects. Some sociologists employ value research to predict how people will behave. Given the observation that someone values the environment, they may conclude that this person is more likely to recycle or support pro-environmental legislation. One approach to this type of research uses value scales, such as the Rokeach Value Survey and the Schwartz theory of basic human values, to measure the value outlook of individuals and groups.

=== Anthropology ===
Anthropology also studies human behavior and societies but does not limit itself to contemporary social structures, extending its focus to humanity both past and present. Similar to sociologists, many anthropologists understand values as social representations of goals worth pursuing. For them, values are embedded in mental structures associated with culture and ideology about what is desirable. A slightly different approach in anthropology focuses on the practical side of values, holding that values are constantly created through human activity.

Anthropological value theorists use values to compare cultures. They can be employed to examine similarities as universal concerns present in every society. For example, anthropologist Clyde Kluckhohn and sociologist Fred Strodtbeck proposed a set of value orientations found in every culture. These orientations are centered on the topics of human nature, human activity, social organization, relation to nature, and a focus on past, present, or future. Values can also be used to analyze differences between cultures and value changes within a culture. Anthropologist Louis Dumont followed this idea, suggesting that the cultural meaning systems in distinct societies differ in their value priorities. He argued that values are ordered hierarchically around a set of paramount values that trump all other values. For example, Dumont analyzed the traditional Indian caste system as a cultural hierarchy based on the value of purity, extending from the pure Brahmins to the "untouchable" Dalits.

The contrast between individualism and collectivism is an influential topic in cross-cultural value research. Individualism promotes values associated with the autonomy of individuals, such as self-directedness, independence, and the fulfillment of personal goals. Collectivism gives priority to group-related values, like cooperation, conformity, and foregoing personal advantages for the sake of collective benefits. As a rough simplification, it is often suggested that individualism is more prominent in Western cultures, whereas collectivism is more commonly observed in Eastern cultures.

=== Psychology ===
As the study of mental phenomena and behavior, psychology contrasts with sociology and anthropology by focusing more on the perspective of individuals than the broader social and cultural contexts. Psychologists tend to understand values as abstract motivational goals or general principles about what matters. From this perspective, values differ from specific plans and intentions since they are stable evaluative tendencies not bound to concrete situations.

Various psychological theories of values establish a close link between an individual's evaluative outlook and their personality. An early theory, formulated by psychologists Philip E. Vernon and Gordon Allport, understands personality as a collection of aspects unified by a coherent value system. It distinguishes between six personality types corresponding to the value spheres of theory, economy, aesthetics, society, politics, and religion. For example, people with theoretical personalities place special importance on the value of knowledge and the discovery of truth. Influenced by Vernon and Allport, psychologist Milton Rokeach conceptualized values as enduring beliefs about what goals and conduct are preferable. He divided values into the categories of instrumental and terminal values. He thought that a central aspect of personality lies in how people prioritize the values within each category. Psychologist Shalom Schwartz refined this approach by linking values to emotion and motivation. He explored how value rankings affect decisions in which the values of different options conflict.

== History ==
The origin of value theory lies in the ancient period, with early reflections on the good life and the ends worth pursuing. Socrates (c. 469–399 BCE) identified the highest good as the right combination of knowledge, pleasure, and virtue, holding that active inquiry is associated with pleasure while knowledge of the Good leads to virtuous action. Plato (c. 428–347 BCE) conceived the Good as a universal and changeless idea. It is the highest form in his theory of forms, acting as the source of all other forms and the foundation of reality and knowledge. Aristotle (384–322 BCE) saw eudaimonia as the highest good and ultimate goal of human life. He understood eudaimonia as a form of happiness or flourishing achieved through the exercise of virtues in accordance with reason, leading to the full realization of human potential. Epicurus (c. 341–271 BCE) proposed a nuanced egoistic hedonism, stating that personal pleasure is the greatest good while recommending moderation to avoid the negative effects of excessive desires and anxiety about the future. According to the Stoics, a virtuous life following nature and reason is the highest good. They thought that self-mastery and rationality lead to a pleasant equanimity independent of external circumstances. Influenced by Plato, Plotinus (c. 204/5–270 CE) held that the Good is the ultimate principle of reality from which everything emanates. For him, evil is not a distinct opposing principle but merely a deficiency or absence of being resulting from a missing connection to the Good.

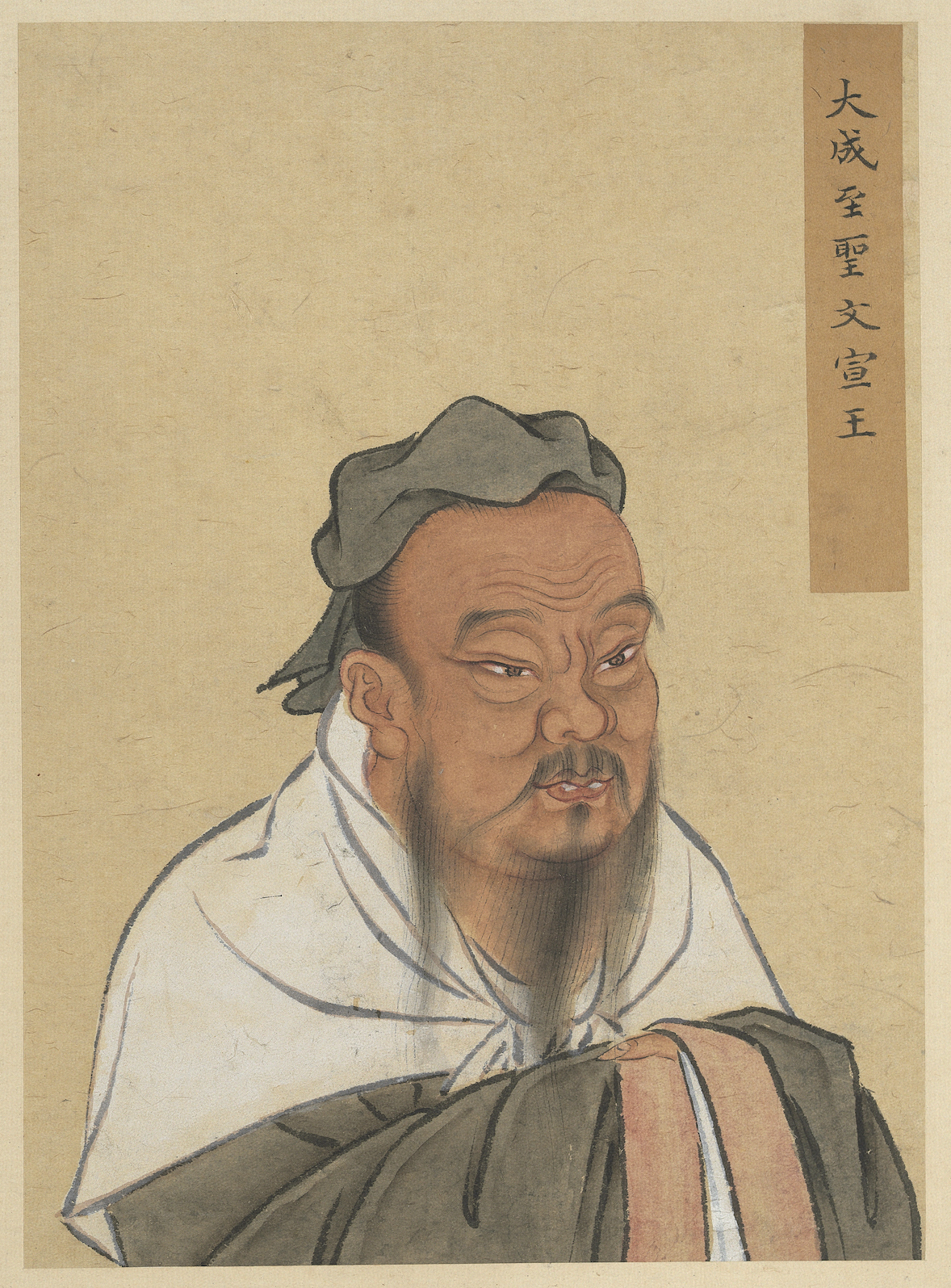
Confucius viewed general benevolence towards humanity as the supreme virtue.

In ancient Indian philosophy, the idea that people are trapped in a cycle of rebirths arose around 600 BCE. Many traditions adopted it, arguing that liberation from this cycle is the highest good. Hindu philosophy distinguishes the four fundamental values of duty, economic wealth, sensory pleasure, and liberation. Many Hindu schools of thought prioritize the value of liberation. A similar outlook is found in ancient Buddhist philosophy, starting between the sixth and the fifth centuries BCE, where the cessation of suffering through the attainment of Nirvana is considered the ultimate goal. In ancient China, Confucius (c. 551–479 BCE) explored the role of self-cultivation in leading a virtuous life, viewing general benevolence towards humanity as the supreme virtue. In comparing the highest virtue to water, Laozi (6th century BCE) (Note: This period is given in traditional sources. Some contemporary scholars have suggested later dates or questioned whether there was a single person by that name.) emphasized the importance of living in harmony with the natural order of the universe.

Religious teachings influenced value theory in the medieval period. Early Christian thinkers, such as Augustine of Hippo (354–430 CE), adapted the theories of Plato and Plotinus into a religious framework. They identified God as the ultimate source of existence and goodness, seeing evil as a mere lack or privation of good. Drawing on Aristotelianism, Christian philosopher Thomas Aquinas (1224–1274 CE) said that communion with the divine, achieved through a beatific vision of God, is the highest end of humans. In Arabic–Persian philosophy, Avicenna (980–1037 CE) regarded the intellect as the highest human faculty. He thought that a contemplative life prepares humans for the greatest good, which is only attained in the afterlife when humans are free from bodily distractions. In Chinese thought, the early neo-Confucian philosopher Han Yu (768–824 CE) identified the sage as an ideal role model who, through self-cultivation, achieves personal integrity expressed in harmony between theory and action in daily life.

In the early modern period, Thomas Hobbes (1588–1679) understood values as subjective phenomena that depend on a person's interests and examined mutual interests and benefits as a key principle of political decisions. David Hume (1711–1776) agreed with Hobbes's subjectivism, exploring how values differ from objective facts. Immanuel Kant (1724–1804) asserted that the highest good is happiness in proportion to moral virtue. He emphasized the primacy of virtue by respecting the moral law and the inherent value of people, adding that moral virtue is ideally, but not always, accompanied by personal happiness. Jeremy Bentham (1748–1832) and John Stuart Mill (1806–1873) formulated classical utilitarianism, combining a hedonist theory about value with a consequentialist theory about right action. Hermann Lotze (1817–1881) developed a philosophy of values, holding that values make the world meaningful as an ordered whole centered around goodness. Influenced by Lotze, the neo-Kantian philosopher Wilhelm Windelband (1848–1915) understood philosophy as a theory of values, claiming that universal values determine the principles that all subjects should follow, including the norms of knowledge and action. Friedrich Nietzsche (1844–1900) held that values are human creations. He criticized traditional values in general and Christian values in particular, calling for a revaluation of all values centered on life-affirmation, power, and excellence.

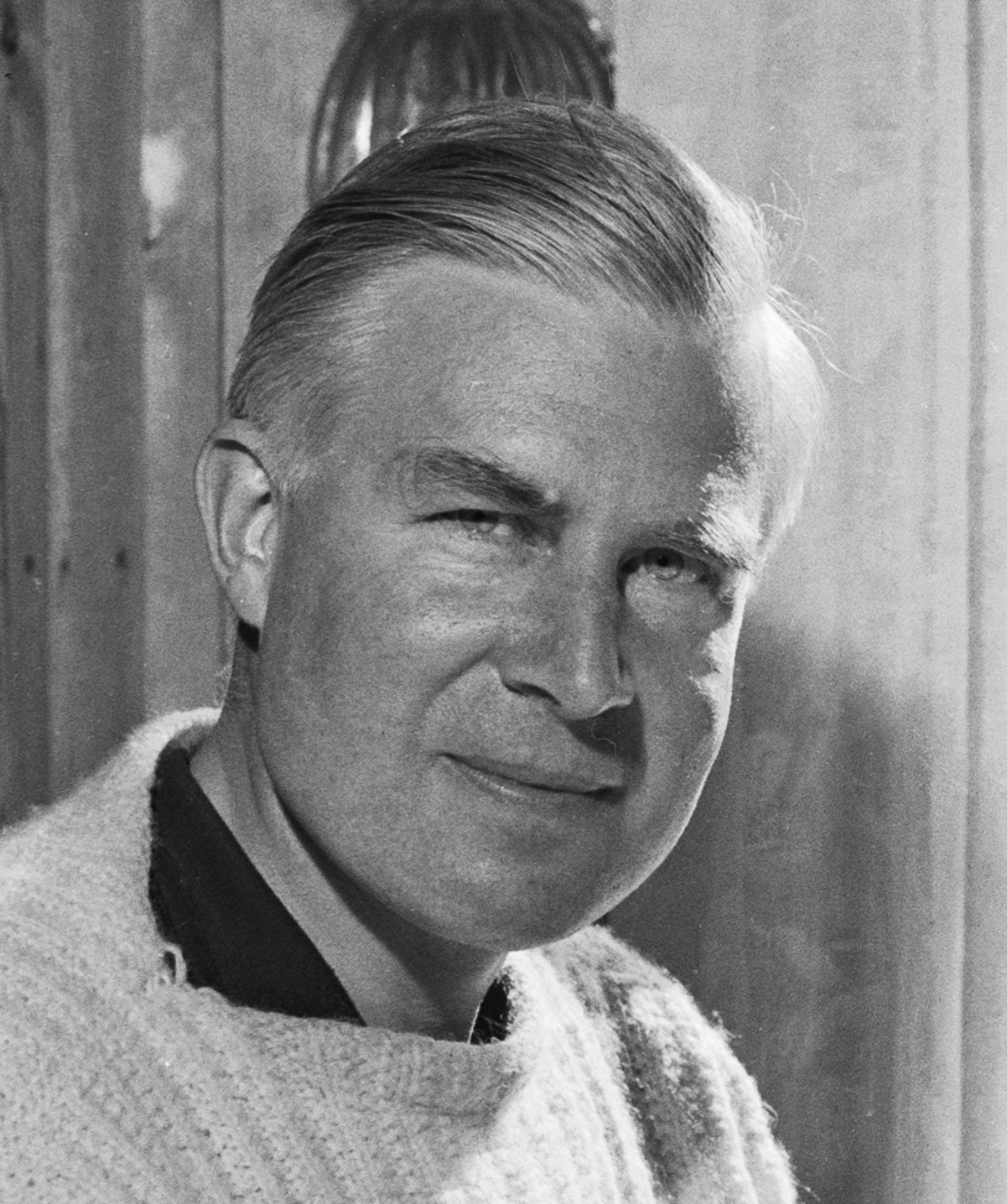
G. H. von Wright analyzed and compared diverse types of goodness.

In the early 20th century, Pragmatist philosopher John Dewey (1859–1952) defended axiological naturalism. He distinguished values from value judgments, adding that the skill of correct value assessment must be learned through experience. (Note: Clarence Irving Lewis (1883–1964) adopted and further developed many of Dewey's insights.) G. E. Moore (1873–1958) developed and refined various axiological concepts, such as organic unity and the contrast between intrinsic and extrinsic value. He defended non-naturalism about the nature of values and intuitionism about the knowledge of values. W. D. Ross (1877–1971) accepted and further elaborated on Moore's intuitionism, using it to formulate an axiological pluralism. (Note: Ross is primarily known for his deontological pluralism about different types of prima facie duties, which is related but not identical to his axiological pluralism about different types of values.) R. B. Perry (1876–1957) and D. W. Prall (1886–1940) articulated systematic theories of value based on the idea that values originate in affective states such as interest and liking. Robert S. Hartman (1910–1973) developed formal axiology, saying that values measure the level to which a thing embodies its ideal concept. A. J. Ayer (1910–1989) proposed anti-realism about values, arguing that value statements merely express the speaker's approval or disapproval. A different type of anti-realism, introduced by J. L. Mackie (1917–1981), suggests that all value assertions are false since no values exist. G. H. von Wright (1916–2003) provided a conceptual analysis of the term good by distinguishing different meanings or varieties of goodness, such as the technical goodness of a good driver and the hedonic goodness of a good meal.

In continental philosophy, Franz Brentano (1838–1917) formulated an early version of the fitting-attitude theory of value, saying that a thing is good if it is fitting to have a positive attitude towards it, such as love. In the 1890s, his students Alexius Meinong (1853–1920) and Christian von Ehrenfels (1859–1932) conceived the idea of a general theory of values. Edmund Husserl (1859–1938), another of Brentano's students, developed phenomenology and applied this approach to the study of values. Following Husserl's approach, Max Scheler (1874–1928) and Nicolai Hartmann (1882–1950) each proposed a comprehensive system of axiological ethics. Asserting that values have objective reality, they explored how different value types form a hierarchy and examined the problems of value conflicts and right decisions from this hierarchical perspective. Martin Heidegger (1889–1976) criticized value theory, claiming that it rests on a mistaken metaphysical perspective by understanding values as aspects of things. Existentialist philosopher Jean-Paul Sartre (1905–1980) suggested that values do not exist by themselves but are actively created, emphasizing the role of human freedom, responsibility, and authenticity in the process.
