= Value (ethics) =

Personal value, basis for ethical action

In ethics and social sciences, value denotes the degree of importance of something or an action, with the aim of determining which actions are best to do or what way is best to live (normative ethics), or to describe the significance of different actions. Value systems are proscriptive and prescriptive beliefs; they affect the ethical behavior of a person or are the basis of their intentional activities. Often primary values are strong and secondary values are more susceptible to changes. What makes an action valuable may in turn depend on the ethical values of the objects it increases, decreases, or alters. An object with "ethic value" may be termed an "ethic or philosophic good" (noun sense).

Values can be defined as broad preferences concerning appropriate courses of actions or outcomes. As such, values reflect a person's sense of right and wrong or what "ought" to be. "Equal rights for all", "Excellence deserves admiration", and "People should be treated with respect and dignity" are representatives of values. Values tend to influence attitudes and behavior, and these types include moral values, doctrinal or ideological values, social values, and aesthetic values. It is debated whether some values that are not clearly physiologically determined, such as altruism, are intrinsic, and whether some, such as acquisitiveness, should be classified as vices or virtues.

== Fields of study ==
Value may be regarded as a study under ethics, which, in turn, may be grouped as philosophy. Similarly, ethical value may be regarded as a subgroup of a broader field referred to as axiology. Ethical value denotes something's degree of importance, with the aim of determining what action or life is best to do, or at least attempt to describe the value of different actions.

Value theory, the study of ethical value, includes the use of other disciplines, such as: anthropology, behavioral economics, business ethics, corporate governance, moral philosophy, political sciences, social psychology, sociology and theology.

=== Similar concepts ===
Ethical value is sometimes used synonymously with goodness. However, "goodness" has many other meanings and may be regarded as more ambiguous.

Social value is a concept used in the public sector and in philanthropic contexts to cover the net social, environmental and economic benefits of individual and collective actions for which the concepts of economic value or profit are inadequate. For example, UK public procurement legislation refers to "social value" in its requirement that public bodies commissioning public services take account of the social, environmental and economic well-being of the area where a contract will be delivered: see Public Services (Social Value) Act 2012. Local authorities have adopted "social value" policies which facilitate a fair and consistent approach to implementing this duty: for example, Cornwall Council's Social Value policy notes that "bringing consistency in performance and our outcomes will mean that the process for defining social value will be standardised". In regard to central government procurement, the "Social Value Model" aims to ensure that comparable benefits are secured through procurement, and the Welsh government refers to "social value requirements" and "social value clauses" in its own public procurement guidance. The Bill & Melinda Gates Foundation refers to "social value creation" as a quantifiable objective in public policy and philanthropic decision-making.

== Types of value ==
=== Personal versus cultural ===
Personal values exist in relation to cultural values, either in agreement with or divergence from prevailing norms. A culture is a social system that shares a set of common values, in which such values permit social expectations and collective understandings of the good, beautiful and constructive. Without normative personal values, there would be no cultural reference against which to measure the virtue of individual values and so cultural identity would disintegrate.

=== Relative or absolute ===
Relative values differ between people, and on a larger scale, between people of different cultures. On the other hand, there are theories of the existence of absolute values, which can also be termed noumenal values (and not to be confused with mathematical absolute value). An absolute value can be described as philosophically absolute and independent of individual and cultural views, as well as independent of whether it is known or apprehended or not. Ludwig Wittgenstein was pessimistic about the idea that an elucidation would ever happen regarding the absolute values of actions or objects; "we can speak as much as we want about "life" and "its meaning", and believe that what we say is important. But these are no more than expressions and can never be facts, resulting from a tendency of the mind and not the heart or the will".

=== Intrinsic or extrinsic ===
Philosophic value may be split into instrumental value and intrinsic values. An instrumental value is worth having as a means towards getting something else that is good (e.g., a radio is instrumentally good in order to hear music). An intrinsically valuable thing is worth for itself, not as a means to something else. It is giving value intrinsic and extrinsic properties.

An ethic good with instrumental value may be termed an ethic mean, and an ethic good with intrinsic value may be termed an end-in-itself. An object may be both a mean and end-in-itself.

==== Summation ====
Intrinsic and instrumental goods are not mutually exclusive categories. Some objects are both good in themselves, and also good for getting other objects that are good. "Understanding science" may be such a good, being both worthwhile in and of itself, and as a means of achieving other goods. In these cases, the sum of instrumental (specifically the all instrumental value) and intrinsic value of an object may be used when putting that object in value systems, which is a set of consistent values and measures.

=== Universal values ===
S. H. Schwartz, along with a number of psychology colleagues, has carried out empirical research investigating whether there are universal values, and what those values are. Schwartz defined 'values' as "conceptions of the desirable that influence the way people select action and evaluate events". He hypothesised that universal values would relate to three different types of human need: biological needs, social co-ordination needs, and needs related to the welfare and survival of groups.

=== Intensity ===
The intensity of philosophic value is the degree it is generated or carried out, and may be regarded as the prevalence of the good, the object having the value.

It should not be confused with the amount of value per object, although the latter may vary too, e.g. because of instrumental value conditionality. For example, taking a fictional life-stance of accepting waffle-eating as being the end-in-itself, the intensity may be the speed that waffles are eaten, and is zero when no waffles are eaten, e.g. if no waffles are present. Still, each waffle that had been present would still have value, no matter if it was being eaten or not, independent on intensity.

Instrumental value conditionality in this case could be exampled by every waffle not present, making them less valued by being far away rather than easily accessible.

In many life stances it is the product of value and intensity that is ultimately desirable, i.e. not only to generate value, but to generate it in large degree. Maximizing life-stances have the highest possible intensity as an imperative.

=== Positive and negative value ===
There may be a distinction between positive and negative philosophic or ethic value. While positive ethic value generally correlates with something that is pursued or maximized, negative ethic value correlates with something that is avoided or minimized. Research has also presented social value as a set of measurable social outcomes that can be positive, neutral, or negative, rejecting the assumption that "social value" is inherently positive or negative.

=== Protected value ===
A protected value (also sacred value) is one that an individual is unwilling to trade off no matter what the benefits of doing so may be. For example, some people may be unwilling to kill another person, even if it means saving many other individuals. Protected values tend to be "intrinsically good", and most people can in fact imagine a scenario when trading off their most precious values would be necessary. If such trade-offs happen between two competing protected values such as killing a person and defending your family they are called tragic trade-offs.

Protected values have been found to be play a role in protracted conflicts (e.g., the Israeli-Palestinian conflict) because they can hinder businesslike (''utilitarian'') negotiations. A series of experimental studies directed by Scott Atran and Ángel Gómez among combatants on the ISIS front line in Iraq and with ordinary citizens in Western Europe suggest that commitment to sacred values motivate the most "devoted actors" to make the costliest sacrifices, including willingness to fight and die, as well as a readiness to forsake close kin and comrades for those values if necessary. From the perspective of utilitarianism, protected values are biases when they prevent utility from being maximized across individuals.

According to Jonathan Baron and Mark Spranca, protected values arise from norms as described in theories of deontological ethics (the latter often being referred to in context with Immanuel Kant). The protectedness implies that people are concerned with their participation in transactions rather than just the consequences of it.

=== Economic versus philosophic value ===
Philosophical value is distinguished from economic value, since it is independent from some other desired condition or commodity. The economic value of an object may rise when the exchangeable desired condition or commodity, e.g. money, become high in supply, and vice versa when supply of money becomes low.

Nevertheless, economic value may be regarded as a result of philosophical value. In the subjective theory of value, the personal philosophic value a person puts in possessing something is reflected in what economic value this person puts on it. The limit where a person considers to purchase something may be regarded as the point where the personal philosophic value of possessing something exceeds the personal philosophic value of what is given up in exchange for it, e.g. money. In this light, everything can be said to have a "personal economic value" in contrast to its "societal economic value."

== Personal values ==
Personal values provide an internal reference for what is good, beneficial, important, useful, beautiful, desirable and constructive. Values are one of the factors that generate behavior (besides needs, interests and habits) and influence the choices made by an individual.

Values may help common human problems for survival by comparative rankings of value, the results of which provide answers to questions of why people do what they do and in what order they choose to do them. Moral, religious, and personal values, when held rigidly, may also give rise to conflicts that result from a clash between differing world views.

Over time the public expression of personal values that groups of people find important in their day-to-day lives, lay the foundations of law, custom and tradition. Recent research has thereby stressed the implicit nature of value communication. Consumer behavior research proposes there are six internal values and three external values. They are known as List of Values (LOV) in management studies. They are self respect, warm relationships, sense of accomplishment, self-fulfillment, fun and enjoyment, excitement, sense of belonging, being well respected, and security. From a functional aspect these values are categorized into three and they are interpersonal relationship area, personal factors, and non-personal factors. From an ethnocentric perspective, it could be assumed that a same set of values will not reflect equally between two groups of people from two countries. Though the core values are related, the processing of values can differ based on the cultural identity of an individual.

=== Individual differences ===
Schwartz proposed a theory of individual values based on surveys data. His model groups values in terms of growth versus protection, and personal versus social focus. Values are then associated with openness to change (which Schwartz views as related to personal growth), self-enhancement (which Schwartz views as mostly to do with self-protection), conservation (which Schwartz views as mostly related to social-protection), and self-transcendence (which Schwartz views as a form of social growth). Within this Schwartz places 10 universal values: self-direction, stimulation and hedonism (related to openness growth), achievement and power (related to self enhancement), security, conformity and tradition (related to conservation), and humility, benevolence and universalism (relate to self-transcendence).

Personality traits using the big 5 measure correlate with Schwartz's value construct. Openness and extraversion correlates with the values related to openness-to-change (openness especially with self-direction, extraversion especially with stimulation); agreeableness correlates with self-transcendence values (especially benevolence); extraversion is correlated with self-enhancement and negatively with traditional values. Conscientiousness correlates with achievement, conformity and security.

Men are found to value achievement, self-direction, hedonism, and stimulation more than women, while women value benevolence, universality and tradition higher.

The order of Schwartz's traits are substantially stability amongst adults over time. Migrants values change when they move to a new country, but the order of preferences is still quite stable. Motherhood causes women to shift their values towards stability and away from openness-to-change but not fathers.

Correlations between Moral foundations and Schwartz's basic values with values taken from

=== Moral foundations theory ===
Moral foundation theory identifies five forms of moral foundation: harm/care, fairness/reciprocity, in-group/loyalty, authority/respect, and purity/sanctity. The first two are often termed individualizing foundations, with the remaining three being binding foundations. The moral foundations were found to be correlated with the theory of basic human values. The strong correlations are between conservatives values and binding foundations.

== Cultural values ==
Individual cultures emphasize values which their members broadly share. Values of a society can often be identified by examining the level of honor and respect received by various groups and ideas.

Values clarification differs from cognitive moral education:

- Value clarification consists of "helping people clarify what their lives are for and what is worth working for. It encourages students to define their own values and to understand others' values."
- Cognitive moral education builds on the belief that students should learn to value things like democracy and justice as their moral reasoning develops.

Values relate to the norms of a culture, but they are more global and intellectual than norms. Norms provide rules for behavior in specific situations, while values identify what should be judged as good or evil. While norms are standards, patterns, rules and guides of expected behavior, values are abstract concepts of what is important and worthwhile. Flying the national flag on a holiday is a norm, but it reflects the value of patriotism. Wearing dark clothing and appearing solemn are normative behaviors to manifest respect at a funeral. Different cultures represent values differently and to different levels of emphasis. "Over the last three decades, traditional-age college students have shown an increased interest in personal well-being and a decreased interest in the welfare of others." Values seemed to have changed, affecting the beliefs, and attitudes of the students.

Members take part in a culture even if each member's personal values do not entirely agree with some of the normative values sanctioned in that culture. This reflects an individual's ability to synthesize and extract aspects valuable to them from the multiple subcultures they belong to.

If a group member expresses a value that seriously conflicts with the group's norms, the group's authority may carry out various ways of encouraging conformity or stigmatizing the non-conforming behavior of that member. For example, imprisonment can result from conflict with social norms that the state has established as law.

Furthermore, cultural values can be expressed at a global level through institutions participating in the global economy. For example, values important to global governance can include leadership, legitimacy, and efficiency. Within our current global governance architecture, leadership is expressed through the G20, legitimacy through the United Nations, and efficiency through member-driven international organizations. The expertise provided by international organizations and civil society depends on the incorporation of flexibility in the rules, to preserve the expression of identity in a globalized world.

Nonetheless, in warlike economic competition, differing views may contradict each other, particularly in the field of culture. Thus audiences in Europe may regard a movie as an artistic creation and grant it benefits from special treatment, while audiences in the United States may see it as mere entertainment, whatever its artistic merits. EU policies based on the notion of "cultural exception" can become juxtaposed with the liberal policy of "cultural specificity" in English-speaking countries. Indeed, international law traditionally treats films as property and the content of television programs as a service. Consequently, cultural interventionist policies can find themselves opposed to the Anglo-Saxon liberal position, causing failures in international negotiations.

== Development and transmission ==
Values are generally received through cultural means, especially diffusion and transmission or socialization from parents to children. Parents in different cultures have different values. For example, parents in a hunter–gatherer society or surviving through subsistence agriculture value practical survival skills from a young age. Many such cultures begin teaching babies to use sharp tools, including knives, before their first birthdays. Italian parents value social and emotional abilities and having an even temperament. Spanish parents want their children to be sociable. Swedish parents value security and happiness. Dutch parents value independence, long attention spans, and predictable schedules. American parents are unusual for strongly valuing intellectual ability, especially in a narrow "book learning" sense. The Kipsigis people of Kenya value children who are not only smart, but who employ that intelligence in a responsible and helpful way, which they call ng'om. Luos of Kenya value education and pride which they call "nyadhi".

Factors that influence the development of cultural values are summarized below.

The Inglehart–Welzel cultural map of the world is a two-dimensional cultural map showing the cultural values of the countries of the world along two dimensions: The traditional versus secular-rational values reflect the transition from a religious understanding of the world to a dominance of science and bureaucracy. The second dimension named survival values versus self-expression values represents the transition from industrial society to post-industrial society.

Cultures can be distinguished as tight and loose in relation to how much they adhere to social norms and tolerates deviance. Tight cultures are more restrictive, with stricter disciplinary measures for norm violations while loose cultures have weaker social norms and a higher tolerance for deviant behavior. A history of threats, such as natural disasters, high population density, or vulnerability to infectious diseases, is associated with greater tightness. It has been suggested that tightness allows cultures to coordinate more effectively to survive threats.

Studies in evolutionary psychology have led to similar findings. The so-called regality theory finds that war and other perceived collective dangers have a profound influence on both the psychology of individuals and on the social structure and cultural values. A dangerous environment leads to a hierarchical, authoritarian, and warlike culture, while a safe and peaceful environment fosters an egalitarian and tolerant culture.

== Value system ==
A value system is a set of consistent values used for the purpose of ethical or ideological integrity.

=== Consistency ===
As a member of a society, group or community, an individual can hold both a personal value system and a communal value system at the same time. In this case, the two value systems (one personal and one communal) are externally consistent provided they bear no contradictions or situational exceptions between them.

A value system in its own right is internally consistent when

- its values do not contradict each other and
- its exceptions are or could be
  - abstract enough to be used in all situations and
  - consistently applied.

Conversely, a value system by itself is internally inconsistent if:

- its values contradict each other and
- its exceptions are
  - highly situational and
  - inconsistently applied.

=== Value exceptions ===
Abstract exceptions serve to reinforce the ranking of values. Their definitions are generalized enough to be relevant to any and all situations. Situational exceptions, on the other hand, are ad hoc and pertain only to specific situations. The presence of a type of exception determines one of two more kinds of value systems:

- An idealized value system is a listing of values that lacks exceptions. It is, therefore, absolute and can be codified as a strict set of proscriptions on behavior. Those who hold to their idealized value system and claim no exceptions (other than the default) are called absolutists.
- A realized value system contains exceptions to resolve contradictions between values in practical circumstances. This type is what people tend to use in daily life.

The difference between these two types of systems can be seen when people state that they hold one value system yet in practice deviate from it, thus holding a different value system. For example, a religion lists an absolute set of values while the practice of that religion may include exceptions.

Implicit exceptions bring about a third type of value system called a formal value system. Whether idealized or realized, this type contains an implicit exception associated with each value: "as long as no higher-priority value is violated". For instance, a person might feel that lying is wrong. Since preserving a life is probably more highly valued than adhering to the principle that lying is wrong, lying to save someone's life is acceptable. Perhaps too simplistic in practice, such a hierarchical structure may warrant explicit exceptions.

=== Conflict ===
Although sharing a set of common values, like hockey is better than baseball or ice cream is better than fruit, two different parties might not rank those values equally. Also, two parties might disagree as to certain actions are right or wrong, both in theory and in practice, and find themselves in an ideological or physical conflict.

An example conflict would be a value system based on individualism pitted against a value system based on collectivism. A rational value system organized to resolve the conflict between two such value systems might take the form below. Added exceptions can become recursive and often convoluted.

- Individuals may act freely unless their actions harm others or interfere with others' freedom or with functions of society that individuals need, provided those functions do not themselves interfere with these proscribed individual rights and were agreed to by a majority of the individuals.
- A society (or more specifically the system of order that enables the workings of a society) exists for the purpose of benefiting the lives of the individuals who are members of that society. The functions of a society in providing such benefits would be those agreed to by the majority of individuals in the society.
- A society may require contributions from its members in order for them to benefit from the services provided by the society. The failure of individuals to make such required contributions could be considered a reason to deny those benefits to them, although a society could elect to consider hardship situations in determining how much should be contributed.
- A society may restrict behavior of individuals who are members of the society only for the purpose of performing its designated functions agreed to by the majority of individuals in the society, only insofar as they violate the aforementioned values. This means that a society may abrogate the rights of any of its members who fails to uphold the aforementioned values.

== See also ==
- Attitude (psychology) – Concept in psychology and communication studies
- Axiological ethics – Ethical theory about values
- Axiology – Systematic study of values
- Clyde Kluckhohn and his value orientation theory
- Hofstede's Framework for Assessing Culture
- Instrumental and intrinsic value – Philosophical concept
- Intercultural communication – Discipline that studies communication across different cultures and social groups
- Meaning of life – Philosophical and spiritual question
- Paideia – Educational model once used in Athens
- Rokeach Value Survey – Classification in social sciences
- Spiral Dynamics – Model of human development
- The Right and the Good – 1930 book by W. D. Ross
- Value judgment – Philosophical and ethical concept
- Western values – Values underpinning Western civilization
- World Values Survey – Global research project
