= Inglehart–Welzel cultural map of the world =

Scatter plots of several countries's societies

The 2004 version of the map. More recent versions can be found on the WVS website:

The Inglehart–Welzel cultural map of the world is a scatter plot created by political scientists Ronald Inglehart and Christian Welzel based on the World Values Survey and European Values Study. An early version of the map was created in 1997, and several revised versions have been released since.

The map depicts closely linked cultural values that vary between societies in two predominant dimensions: traditional versus secular-rational values on the vertical y-axis and survival versus self-expression values on the horizontal x-axis. Moving upward on this map reflects the shift from traditional values to secular-rational ones and moving rightward reflects the shift from survival values to self-expression values. According to the authors: "These two dimensions explain more than 70 percent of the cross-national variance in a factor analysis of ten indicators—and each of these dimensions is strongly correlated with scores of other important orientations."

The values are connected to the economic development of a country, most strongly with what fraction of sector of a given country's economy is in manufacturing or services, though, the authors stress that socio-economic status is not the sole factor determining a country's location, as their religious and cultural historical heritage is also an important factor.

== Values ==
Analysis of the World Values Survey data by Inglehart and Welzel asserts that there are two major dimensions of cross-cultural variation in the world:

1. x-axis: Survival values versus self-expression values
2. y-axis: Traditional values versus secular–rational values.

The map is a chart in which countries are positioned based on their scores for the two values mapped on the x-axis (survival values versus self-expression values) and the y-axis (traditional values versus secular-rational values). The map shows where societies are located in these two dimensions. Clusters of countries reflect their shared values and not geographical closeness.

Traditional values emphasize the importance of religion, parent-child ties, deference to authority, absolute standards and traditional family values. People who embrace these values also reject divorce, abortion, euthanasia and suicide. Societies that embrace these values have high levels of national pride and a nationalistic outlook.

Secular-rational values have the opposite preferences to the traditional values. Societies that embrace these values place less emphasis on religion, traditional family values and authority. Divorce, abortion, euthanasia and suicide are seen as relatively acceptable.

The shift from traditional to secular-rational values has been described by Engelbrekt and Nygren as "essentially the replacement of religion and superstition with science and bureaucracy as the basis of behaviour and authority relations in a society".

Survival values place emphasis on economic and physical security. They are linked with a relatively ethnocentric outlook and low levels of trust and tolerance.

Self-expression values give high priority to subjective well-being, self-expression, individual freedom, and quality of life. Some values more common in societies that embrace these values include environmental protection, growing tolerance of foreigners, gays and lesbians and gender equality, rising demands for participation in decision-making in economic and political life (autonomy and freedom from central authority), interpersonal trust, political moderation, and a shift in child-rearing values from emphasis on hard work toward imagination and tolerance.

The shift from survival to self-expression also represents the transition from industrial society to post-industrial society, as well as embracing democratic values. The shift from traditional to secular-rational values has a strong correlation (0.65) with the fraction of a country's economy that is in the industrial sector, while the shift from survival to self-expression values is unrelated to the size of the country's industrial sector, but has a strong correlation (0.73) with the size of the country's service sector.

== Clusters ==
A 2017 version of the map had countries divided into nine clusters: the English-speaking, Latin America, Catholic Europe, Protestant Europe, African-Islamic, Baltic, South Asian, Orthodox and Confucian clusters. In previous studies, the African-Islamic cluster was split into two (the African cluster and the Islamic cluster) and the Baltic states did not have their own cluster.

Another proposed way to cluster the societies is by material wealth, with the poorer societies at the bottom of both axes, and richer at the top.

== Country-specific analysis ==
Out of Western world countries, the United States is among the most conservative (as one of the most downwards-located countries), together with highly conservative Catholic countries such as Ireland and Poland. Simoni concludes that "On the traditional/secular dimension, the United States ranks far below other rich societies, with levels of religiosity and national pride comparable with those found in some developing societies."

Asian societies are distributed in the traditional/secular dimension in two clusters, with more secular Confucian societies at the top, and more traditional South Asian ones at the center of the map.

Russia is among the most survival-value oriented countries, and at the other end, Sweden ranks highest on the self-expression chart.

It has also been found that basic cultural values overwhelmingly apply on national lines, with cross-border intermixtures being relatively rare. This is true even between countries with shared cultural histories. Additionally, even cultural clusters of countries do not intermix much across borders. This suggests nations are culturally meaningful units.

== History ==
The map is updated and modified regularly along with the new waves of data from the World Values Survey. The different versions are available at the website of the World Values Survey.

An early version of the map was published by Ronald Inglehart in 1997 with the dimensions named "Traditional vs. Secular-Rational Authority" and "Survival vs. Well-being".

Inglehart and Welzel revised this map in 2005 and named the dimensions "Traditional vs. Secular-Rational Values" and "Survival vs. Self-expression Values". This map and its various updates are generally referred to as the Inglehart–Welzel Cultural Map.

Welzel published a quite different map in 2013 with two closely related dimensions named "Emancipative Values" and "Secular Values", where Emancipative Values provide the main variable behind his theory of human empowerment.

Other cultural maps have been published by Shalom Schwartz, Michael Minkov, and by Stankov, Lee and Vijver.

== Reception ==
The cultural map has generally been well-received; a number of scholars have referred to it as famous (Niels-Christian Fritsche in 2009, Elisabeth Staksrud in 2016, Manfred Buchroithner in 2020, Luigi Curini and Robert Franzese, likewise in 2020).

Despite its popularity, several scholars have questioned whether the two dimensions represent adequate and useful measures of cultural differences. In 2007, Majima and Savage have questioned which measures of culture are most adequate and whether the measured change over time is real, and Bomhoff and Gu in 2012 have argued that East Asian attitudes and values are not adequately reflected.

In 2010 calculations by Beugelsdijk and Welzel suggested that the split into two factors or dimensions is only weakly justified by the data, and that a single-factor solution might be appropriate. In 2013 Welzel has suggested that the two dimensions may be combined under a common framework of human empowerment. Similarly, Inglehart in 2018 finds that a single factor combining cultural values reflects modernization quite well.

According to Agner Fog's 2020 research, a meta-analysis of studies of cultural differences finds that many other studies of cultural differences have resulted in similar factors, but rotated differently. The common practice of factor rotation has obscured the similarity between different studies with different orientations of the axes on the cultural maps. The unrotated solution has the strongest factor or dimension corresponding to a line from the lower left to the upper right of Inglehart and Welzel's map, combining the two dimensions. This combined dimension may be interpreted as development or modernization. It combines a lot of economic, technological, institutional, and psychological variables that happen to be strongly correlated with each other. An unrotated second factor or dimension corresponds to a vertical line on Inglehart and Welzel's map, reflecting the special cultural values of East Asian cultures.

In 2020 Fred Dervin, Robyn Moloney and Ashley Simpson criticized the map for "cultural essentialism and potential racism" due to generalizations and simplifications which stigmatize developing countries and label them as being inferior to predominantly White, European, Christian countries.

== See also ==
- Hofstede's cultural dimensions theory
- Nolan Chart
- Theory of Basic Human Values
