= Self-expression values =

Value dimension

Self-expression values are part of a core value dimension in the modernization process. Self-expression is a cluster of values that include social tolerance, life satisfaction, public expression and an aspiration to liberty. It covers expressing one's personality, emotions, or ideas through art, music, or drama.

Ronald Inglehart, the University of Michigan professor who developed the theory of post-materialism, has worked extensively with this concept. The Inglehart–Welzel Cultural Map contrasts self-expression values with survival values, illustrating the changes in values across countries and generations. The idea that the world is moving towards self-expression values was discussed at length in an article in the Economist.

== Emergence of self-expression values ==
The emergence of the post-industrial society has instigated significant cultural changes. In the United States, Canada, Western Europe, and a growing proportion of East Asia, the vast majority of the people are no longer employed in factories, but work in the service sector instead. There has been a transition from a mechanical environment to one where more people spend more of their time dealing with other individuals, symbols, and information, thus workers in the knowledge sector need to exercise their own judgment and decision-making abilities.

This transition has had significant outcomes:

- This transition has led to historically high levels of prosperity and welfare states that offer food, clothing, shelter, housing, education, and healthcare to almost everyone. Even in the United States, where the welfare state is relatively limited, the government still significantly redistributes part of the GDP. This creates a scenario where the people in respective societies start taking physical survival, minimum living standards, and nearly 80 years of average life expectancy for granted. This further motivates them to pursue goals beyond mere survival.
- Contemporary service-oriented occupations demand the use of cognitive skills. Engineers, teachers, lawyers, accountants, counselors, programmers, and analysts all fall under the category of creative class. Despite sometimes working in hierarchical organizations, creative professionals have a considerable degree of autonomy in their work. The demand for cognitive skills is significantly higher than that in societies during the early stages of industrialisation. In order to meet these demands, the workforces in post-industrial societies are increasingly pursuing higher education, with a focus on creativity, imagination, and intellectual independence.
- Post-industrial societies tend to be more socially liberal than those that preceded them. The centrally controlled, highly regimented workforces of the industrial world have disappeared, along with the strong conformity pressures that came with them. The traditional system, in which children depend on their parents to survive, in return for which they are expected to take care of their parents in old age, has been weakened by the welfare state. As a result, close-knit family structures, once a survival necessity, are now increasingly a matter of choice, replacing 'communities of necessity' with 'elective affinities'.

The destandardisation of economic activities and social life reduces social constraints in unprecedented ways. Therefore, the transition in post-industrial societies is largely characterised by liberation from authority.

== Self-expression values and democracy ==
Different political systems can emerge from industrialization. These include fascism, communism, theocracy and democracy. In contrast, post-industrial societies are associated with socio-cultural changes that strengthen the prospects of genuine and effective democracy.

Knowledge societies cannot function effectively without highly educated workers, who become articulate and accustomed to thinking for themselves. Moreover, rising levels of financial stability bring more emphasis to values of self-expression that prioritise personal freedom of choice. There is an increasing likelihood for mass publics to desire democracy, and they are becoming more effective in achieving it. As time goes on, repressing mass demands for liberalization becomes more damaging and expensive to economic effectiveness. Economic development is connected to democracy due to these changes.

== Empirical measurements of self-expression values ==
The World Values Survey provides the most comprehensive assessment of how values are perceived and expressed. To date, five "waves" have been undertaken, with each including additional countries in the survey.

Subsequent data analysis by Inglehart indicated that a significant proportion of the variation in the data could be accounted for by using measures that accessed only two dimensions: a traditional to secular-rational axis and a survival to self-expression axis. Initially, the factor scores were derived from 22 variables, but they were later reduced to only 10 (5 for each dimension) due to data availability constraints.

The self-expression axis has the following factor loadings.

Survey question	Factor loading
Respondent gives priority to self-expression and quality of life over economic and physical security	0.87
Respondent describes self as very happy	0.81
Homosexuality is sometimes justifiable	0.77
Respondent has signed or would sign a petition	0.74
Respondent does not think one has to be very careful about trusting people	0.46

Although consisting of only five variables, the correlates for this dimension in the WV survey are very strong. Below is a partial list. Positive responses indicate survival values rather than self-expression values.

Survival values emphasize the following (opposite of self-expression values)	Correlation with survival/ self-expression values
Men make better political leaders than women.	0.86
Respondent is dissatisfied with financial situation of his or her household.	0.83
A woman has to have children in order to be fulfilled.	0.83
Respondent rejects foreigners, homosexuals and people with AIDS as neighbors.	0.81
Respondent favors more emphasis on the development of technology.	0.78
Respondent has not recycled things to protect the environment.	0.78
Respondent has not attended a meeting or signed a petition to protect the environment	0.75
When seeking a job, a good income and a safe job are more important than a feeling of accomplishment and working with the people you like.	0.74
Respondent is relatively favorable to state ownership of business and industry.	0.74
A child needs a home with both a mother and a father to grow up happily.	0.73
Respondent does not describe own health as very good.	0.73
One must always love and respect one's parents regardless of their behavior.	0.71
When jobs are scarce, men have more right to a job than women.	0.69
Respondent does not have much free choice or control over his or her life.	0.67
Imagination is not one of the most important things to teach a child.	0.62

== See also ==
- Affluenza
- Consumerism
- Gross national happiness
- Abraham Maslow
- Theory of Basic Human Values
- Asian values
