= Postmaterialism =

Concept in sociology

In sociology, postmaterialism is the transformation of individual values from materialist, physical, and economic to new individual values of autonomy and self-expression. The term was popularized by the political scientist Ronald Inglehart in his 1977 book The Silent Revolution, in which he discovered that the formative affluence experienced by the post-war generations was leading some of them to take their material security for granted and instead place greater importance on non-material goals such as self-expression, autonomy, freedom of speech, gender equality, and environmentalism. Inglehart argued that with increasing prosperity, such postmaterial values would gradually increase in the publics of advanced industrial societies through the process of intergenerational replacement.

The theory of intergenerational change is based on the scarcity hypothesis and the socialization hypothesis. Together, these two hypotheses carry the implication that, given long periods of material affluence, a growing part of society will embrace postmaterialist value systems, an implication that was borne out internationally in the 1980s–2000s years of survey data. The postmaterial orientations acquired by each cohort during socialization have been observed to remain remarkably steady over the time-frame of multiple decades, being a more stable value-system in contrast to the more volatile political and social attitudes.

Postmaterialism can be a tool in developing an understanding of modern culture, and is considered in reference of three distinct concepts of materialism. The first kind of materialism, and the one in reference to which it is used most often, refers to economic materialism as a value-system relating to the desire for fulfillment of material needs (such as security, sustenance, and shelter) and an emphasis on material luxuries in a consumerist society. A second referent is the materialist conception of history held by many socialists, most notably Karl Marx and Friedrich Engels, as well as their philosophic concept of dialectical materialism. The third definition of materialism concerns the philosophical argument that matter is the only existing reality. The first concept is sociological, the second is both philosophical and sociological, and the third is philosophical. Depending on which of the three above notions of materialism are being discussed, postmaterialism can be an ontological postmaterialism, an existentialistic postmaterialism, an ethical postmaterialism, or a political-sociological postmaterialism, which is also the best known.

== History ==
The sociological theory of postmaterialism was developed in the 1970s by Inglehart. After extensive survey research, Inglehart postulated that the Western societies under the scope of his survey were undergoing transformation of individual values, switching from materialist values, emphasizing economic and physical security, to a new set of postmaterialist values, which instead emphasized autonomy and self-expression. Inglehart argued that rising prosperity was gradually liberating the publics of advanced industrial societies from the stress of basic acquisitive or materialistic needs. Observing that the younger people were much more likely to embrace postmaterialist values, Inglehart speculated that this silent revolution was not merely a case of a life-cycle change, with people becoming more materialist as they aged, but a genuine example of generational replacement causing intergenerational value change.

=== Scarcity hypothesis ===
Inglehart assumed that individuals pursue various goals in something akin to a hierarchical order. While people may universally aspire to freedom and autonomy, the most pressing material needs like hunger, thirst and physical security have to be satisfied first, since they are immediately linked with survival. According to Inglehart's interpretation of Abraham Maslow's hierarchy of human goals ("Maslow's hierarchy of needs"), while scarcity prevails, these materialistic goals will have priority over postmaterialist goals like belonging, esteem, and aesthetic and intellectual satisfaction; however, once the satisfaction of the survival needs can be taken for granted, the focus will gradually shift to these "non-material" goods.

=== Socialization hypothesis ===
The relationship between material conditions and value priorities is not one of immediate adjustment. A large body of evidence indicates that people's basic values are largely fixed when they reach adulthood, and change relatively little thereafter. Therefore, cohorts which often experienced economic scarcity would ceteris paribus (all things being equal) place a high value on meeting economic needs (such as valuing economic growth above protecting the environment) and on safety needs (will support more authoritarian styles of leadership, will exhibit strong feelings of national pride, will be strongly in favour of maintaining a large, strong army and will be more willing to sacrifice civil liberties for the sake of law and order). On the other hand, cohorts who have experienced sustained high material affluence start to give high priority to values such as individual improvement, personal freedom, citizen input in government decisions, the ideal of a society based on humanism, and maintaining a clean and healthy environment.

=== Measuring postmaterialism ===
There are several ways of empirically measuring the spread of postmaterialism in a society. A common and relatively simple way is by creating an index from survey respondents' patterns of responses to a series of items which were designed to measure personal political priorities.

"If you had to choose among the following things, which are the two that seem the most desirable to you?

- Maintaining order in the nation.
- Giving people more say in important political decisions.
- Fighting rising prices.
- Protecting freedom of speech.

... On the basis of the choices made among these four items, it is possible to classify our respondents into value priority groups, ranging from a "pure" acquisitive type to a "pure" post-bourgeois type, with several intermediate categories."

The theoretical assumptions and the empirical research connected with the concept of postmaterialism have received considerable attention and critical discussion in the human sciences. Amongst others, the validity, stability, and causation of postmaterialism has been doubted. The "Inglehart-index" has been included in several surveys (e.g., General Social Survey, World Values Survey, Eurobarometer, ALLBUS, and Turning Points of the Life-Course). The time series in ALLBUS (German General Social Survey) is particularly comprehensive. From 1980 to 1990, the share of "pure post-materialists" increased from 13% to 31% in West Germany. After the economic and social stress caused by German reunification in 1990, it dropped to 23% in 1992 and stayed on that level afterwards. The ALLBUS sample from the less affluent population in East Germany show much lower portions of postmaterialists (1991: 15%, 1992: 10%, 1998: 12%). International data from the 2000 World Values Survey show the highest percentage of postmaterialists in Australia (35%), followed by Austria (30%), Canada (29%), Italy (28%), Argentina (25%), United States (25%), Sweden (22%), Netherlands (22%), and Puerto Rico (22%).

In the early 21st century, the issue of a "second generation of postmaterialism" appearing on the scene of worldwide civil society, to a large extent conceived as their "positive ideological embodiment", was brought up by cultural scientist Roland Benedikter in his seven-volume book series Postmaterialismus (2001–2005). As increasing postmaterialism is based on the abundance of material possessions or resources, it should not be mixed indiscriminately with asceticism or general denial of consumption. In some way, postmaterialism may be described as supermaterialism. German data show that there is a tendency towards this orientation among young people, in the economically rather secure public service, and in the managerial middle class.

== See also ==
- Academic freedom
- Affluenza
- Artistic freedom
- Digital rights
- Freedom of thought
- Gross National Happiness
- Historical revisionism
- Integral theory (Ken Wilber)
- Material feminism
- Materialism (disambiguation)
  - Economic materialism
- Non-possession
- Old Left and New Left
- Post-growth
- Postmodernity
- Reflexive modernization
- Reverse post-material thesis
- Self-expression values
- To Have or to Be?
- World Values Survey

People

- John Kenneth Galbraith
- Anthony Giddens

== Bibliography ==
- Inglehart, Ronald (1971). "The Silent Revolution in Europe: Intergenerational Change in Post-Industrial Societies" (PDF). American Political Science Review. 65 (4): 991–1017. doi:10.2307/1953494. ISSN 1537-5943. JSTOR 1953494. S2CID 145368579.
- ——— (1977). The Silent Revolution: Changing Values and Political Styles Among Western Publics. Princeton, New Jersey: Princeton University Press. ISBN 978-0-691-10038-8.
- ——— (2008). "Changing Values Among Western Publics from 1970 to 2006". West European Politics. 31 (1–2): 130–146. doi:10.1080/01402380701834747. ISSN 1743-9655. S2CID 55743315.
- Inglehart, Ronald; Basáñez, Miguel; Díez-Medrano, Jaime; Halmann, Loek; Luijkx, Ruud, eds. (2004). Human Beliefs and Values: A Cross-Cultural Sourcebook Based on the 1999–2002 Values Surveys. Mexico City: Siglo Veintiuno Editores. ISBN 978-968-23-2502-1.
- Pappi, Franz Urban; Terwey, Michael (1982). "The German Electorate: Old Cleavages and New Political Conflicts". In Döring, Herbert; Smith, Gordon (eds.). Party Government and Political Culture in Western Germany. London: Macmillan. pp. 174–196. doi:10.1007/978-1-349-16713-5. ISBN 978-0-333-29082-8.
- Rokeach, Milton (1968). Beliefs, Attitudes and Values. San Francisco: Jossey-Bass.
- Terwey, Michael (2000). "ALLBUS: A German General Social Survey". Schmollers Jahrbuch: Zeitschrift für Wirtschafts- un Sozalwissenschaften. 120 (1): 151–158. ISSN 0342-1783.
- ZA (Zentralarchiv für Empirische Sozialforschung); ZUMA (Zentrum für Umfragen, Methoden und Analysen) (2005). German General Social Survey. ALLBUS / GGSS Cumulation 1980–2004 (ZA-Study-No 4243). Electronic Codebook, integrated Data File, and Survey Description. Cologne: GESIS.
