= Freedom Rising =

2013 book by Christian Welzel

Freedom Rising: Human Empowerment and the Quest for Emancipation
- Authors: Christian Welzel
- Language: English
- Subject: Comparative Politics, Political sociology
- Genre: Nonfiction
- Publisher: Cambridge University Press
- Publication date: December 23, 2013
- Media type: Hardcover, Paperback, Amazon Kindle
- Pages: 480
- ISBN: 9781107034709
- OCLC: 843955736

Freedom Rising: Human Empowerment and the Quest for Emancipation is a 2013 book by the German political scientist Christian Welzel, professor of political culture and political sociology at Leuphana University Lueneburg and vice-president of the World Values Survey.

== The Title ==
The title, Freedom Rising, refers to the rapid expansion of universal freedoms and democracy. As the author explains at the beginning of his book, people have never voiced their desires for freedoms so frequently and powerfully as today. They do so not only inside but even outside democracies. Starting from here, Christian Welzel's book is about the human quest for freedoms and the human desire for emancipation. The result is a far-reaching theory of emancipation, which describes the human empowerment process.

== Content and Structure ==
The book comprises twelve chapters that are organized in four parts. While the first chapter is theoretical, all subsequent chapters are empirical and test the propositions laid out in Chapter 1. The empirical research builds on cross-cultural and longitudinal evidence form the World Values Surveys and European Values Study.

=== Part A: Understanding Emancipative Values ===
(Chapter 1: A Theory of Emancipation; Chapter 2: Mapping Differences; Chapter 3: Multilevel Drivers; Chapter 4: Tracing Change)

The first part provides a basic understanding of emancipative values. Welzel introduces the endogenous cause to human development in his sequence thesis of emancipation. The thesis establishes a main direction of causality from action resources (founding element) to emancipative values (linking element) to civic entitlements (completing element). It argues that emancipative values result from expanding resources which implies that they are a universal and not a Western-bound concept. The concept of cross-fertilization highlights the amplification of a person's values when they are shared by more people in the same society.

=== Part B: Emancipative Values as Civic Force ===
(Chapter 5: Intrinsic Qualities; Chapter 6: Benign Individualism; Chapter 7: Collective Action)

The second part presents emancipative values as a pro-social set of values and a groundbreaking civic force that "unlocks a population's intrinsic qualities, vitalizes civil society, and creates social capital". Welzel illustrates that rising emancipative values cause a strategic shift from acquisition strategies to thriving strategies. As thriving strategies aim at fulfillment, pro-social behavior is encouraged. The activating and empowering impulse of emancipative values instigates people to have their shared claims heard. As such emancipative values are a crucial source of bottom-up democratization processes.

=== Part C: Democratic Impulses of Emancipative Values ===
(Chapter 8: Entitling People; Chapter 9: The Rights Revolution; Chapter 10: The Paradox of Democracy)

The third part centers on the democratic impulse that emanates from emancipative values. Welzel presents democracy as the institutional element of people's power and action resources together with emancipative values as the two pre-institutional elements of people power. Empirical evidence shows that rising emancipative values have a much higher effect on expanding rights than rights have on rising emancipative values. Welzel concludes that institutions themselves cannot create empowering qualities but depend on them so that the source of democracy lies in the people's desire for emancipation. Here, Freedom Rising disproves the prominent view in political economy which states that institutions come first. Finally, chapter 10 solves the democratic paradox that widespread desires for democracy among people coexist with deficient or even absent democracy. Welzel argues that this is the case when these desires are decoupled from an emphasis on emancipative values that is a critical-liberal orientation.

=== Part D: Emancipative Values in Human Civilization ===
(Chapter 11: The Redirection of Civilization; Chapter 12: The Sustainability Challenge)

The last part looks at emancipative values from a broad civilizational perspective and discusses their significance in history. Welzel presents the cool-water condition (CW condition) as the truly exogenous cause of human empowerment. The last chapter elaborates on the role of emancipative values in meeting the sustainability challenge. Here, Welzel addresses the dilemma that results from the negative environmental impact of technological advancement on the one hand and the positive environmental impact of emancipative values on environmental quality on the other hand. Closer investigation shows that the negative impact of technological advancement is lower than the positive impact of emancipative values on environmental quality. Human empowerment thus helps redirecting society towards sustainable development.

== The Human Empowerment Process ==
The Human Empowerment Process is defined by Welzel as a "humanistic transformation of civilization that makes societies increasingly people-powered". It can be observed when freedoms grow so that Welzel calls it an emancipatory process. It is completed when people are acting freely as agents of their values. Welzel distinguishes between three different stages of the human condition in societies. The human condition can be (1) suffering – weak capabilities and narrow guarantees, (2) struggling – mediocre capabilities and guarantees, (3) thriving – strong capabilities and wide guarantees.

== A Theory of Emancipation ==
Welzel builds his human empowerment framework on an evolutionary theory of emancipation. Emancipation is hereby understood as the universal human desire for an existence free from domination. Emancipative values emphasize freedom of choice and equality of opportunities. In Freedom Rising Welzel identifies the human desire to live free from external constraints as the single source of the human empowerment trend.

The theory of emancipation rests upon one evolutionary root principle: the utility ladder of freedom. Welzel argues that emancipative values do not guide people's actions as long as existential constraints on human life are strong. However, freedoms gain utility when people become more capable due to improving living conditions and rising action resources. In this case emancipative values start guiding people's actions. Emancipative values thus constitute the psychological core and the inspirational source of the human empowerment process. As such they motivate social movement activity and promote anti-discrimination norms. Since joint action among capable and motivated people is so difficult to resist, rulers must at some point give in and guarantee the claimed entitlements, and also abide by them. The third element in the human empowerment process is thus civic entitlements.

== The Sequence Thesis of Emancipation ==
The Sequence thesis explains the endogenous causation of the human empowerment process. It establishes the dominant flow of impact among the three elements of the human development process from action resources to emancipative values to civic entitlements. Freedoms grow in a utility-value-guarantee sequence. The sequence thesis implies an important condition, which defies the most common view that human development is caused by institutions. In contrast to other political scientists like Francis Fukuyama, Daron Acemoglu and James A. Robinson, Christian Welzel demonstrates that institutions guaranteeing universal freedoms are not the cause but the result of the human empowerment process.

== The Cool-Water Condition ==
The sequence thesis of emancipation theory fails to deliver an exogenous causation of human empowerment. Chapter 11 thus introduces a second thesis — the source thesis of emancipation. It posits the original source of human empowerment in the cool-water condition (CW-condition), which "is a combination of (1) moderately cold climates, (2) continuous rainfalls over all seasons, and (3) permanently navigable waterways". According to the source thesis, CW areas offer water autonomy and a higher disease security which naturally locates them higher on the utility ladder of freedom. Welzel demonstrates that the CW condition prevented a transition to agriculture in the first place since foraging was a freer lifestyle. Technological advancement in CW areas was thus lower than in other areas for a long time. With emerging urban markets the situation changed. Water autonomy created derivative autonomies that turned out to be an accelerator of technological advancement. Autonomy in market access encouraged a transition to quality-breeding strategies in people's reproductive behavior with the result that the workforce became less numerous but more valuable. Rising labor demands provided an incentive to invent technologies that save costly labor. The technological advancement involved more widespread action resources, which enhanced people's capabilities to exercise freedoms. From here the sequence thesis of emancipation takes over.

Until today human development is far advanced in all of the world's CW areas, that is in Western Europe, in Japan, in distinctive areas of Northern America, Australia, and New Zealand.

Welzel stresses that — in the era of globalization — human empowerment begins to diffuse elsewhere and slowly dissociates from the CW condition. This erodes the monopoly of the West over human empowerment.

== Reception ==
Freedom Rising received two academic awards:

- Winner of the 2014 Alexander L. George Book Award for the best book in political psychology awarded by the International Society of Political Psychology (ISPP).
- Winner of the 2014 Stein Rokkan Prize for Comparative Social Science Research awarded by the International Social Science Council (ISSC), the University of Bergen and the European Consortium for Political Research (ECPR).
