= Theory of basic human values =

Theory of the basis of human cultural values

Circle chart of values in the theory of basic human values

The theory of basic human values is a theory of cross-cultural psychology and universal values developed by Shalom H. Schwartz. The theory extends previous cross-cultural communication frameworks such as Hofstede's cultural dimensions theory. Schwartz identifies ten basic human values, distinguished by their underlying motivation or goals, and explains how people in all cultures recognize them. There are two major methods for measuring these ten basic values: the Schwartz Value Survey and the Portrait Values Questionnaire.

In value theory, individual values may align with, or conflict against one another, often visualised in a circular diagram where opposing poles indicate values that are in conflict.

An expanded framework of 19 distinct values was presented from Schwartz and colleagues in a 2012 publication, creating on the theory of basic values. These values are conceptualized as "guiding principles" that influence the behaviors and decisions of individuals or groups.

== Motivational types of values ==
The theory of basic human values recognizes eleven universal values, which can be organized in four higher-order groups. Each of the eleven universal values has a central goal that is the underlying motivator.

=== Openness to change ===
- Self-direction – independent thought and action—choosing, creating, and exploring
- Stimulation – excitement, novelty and challenge in life

=== Self-enhancement ===
- Hedonism – pleasure or sensuous gratification for oneself
- Achievement – personal success through demonstrating competence according to social standards
- Power – social status and prestige, control or dominance over people and resources

=== Conservation ===
- Security – safety, harmony, and stability of society, of relationships, and of self
- Conformity – restraint of actions, inclinations, and impulses likely to upset or harm others and violate social expectations or norms
- Tradition – respect, commitment, and acceptance of the customs and ideas that one's culture or religion provides

=== Self-transcendence ===
- Benevolence – preserving and enhancing the welfare of those with whom one is in frequent personal contact (the 'in-group')
- Universalism – understanding, appreciation, tolerance, and protection for the welfare of all people and for nature

=== Other ===
- Spirituality was considered as an additional eleventh value, but was rejected when it was found that it did not exist or play a major role in all cultures.

== The structure of value relations ==
The theory of basic values identifies ten core values and also examines their interrelationships. Pursuing certain values can either align with or conflict against others.

For instance, conformity and security align, while benevolence and power often conflict. Tradition and conformity share similar motivational goals and thus are grouped within the same category.

The values are arranged in a circular model along two main bipolar dimensions. The first dimension, openness to change versus conservation, contrasts values of independence with those centered on obedience. The second dimension, self-enhancement versus self-transcendence, contrasts self-focused interests with values oriented toward the welfare of others.

Although the theory distinguishes ten values, the borders between the motivators are artificial and one value flows into the next, which can be seen by the following shared motivational emphases:

1. Power and Achievement – social superiority and esteem
2. Achievement and Hedonism – self-centered satisfaction
3. Hedonism and Stimulation – a desire for affectively pleasant arousal
4. Stimulation and Self-direction – intrinsic interest in novelty and mastery
5. Self-direction and Universalism – reliance upon one's own judgement and comfort with the diversity of existence
6. Universalism and Benevolence – enhancement of others and transcendence of selfish interests
7. Benevolence and Tradition – devotion to one's in-group
8. Benevolence and Conformity – normative behavior that promotes close relationships
9. Conformity and Tradition – subordination of self in favor of socially imposed expectations
10. Tradition and Security – preserving existing social arrangements that give certainty to life
11. Conformity and Security – protection of order and harmony in relations
12. Security and Power – avoiding or overcoming threats by controlling relationships and resources

Furthermore, people are still able to follow opposing values through acting differently in different settings or at different times. The structure of Schwartz's 10-value type model (see graph above) has been supported across over 80 countries, gender, various methods such as importance ratings of values (using the surveys listed below), direct similarity judgment tasks, pile sorting, and spatial arrangement, and even for how the values of other people, such as family members, are perceived.

== Measurement methods ==
Several models have been developed to measure the basic values to ensure that the values theory is valid independent of the methodology employed. The main differentiator between the Schwartz Value Survey and the Portrait Values Questionnaire is that the former is explicit, while the latter is implicit.

=== Schwartz Value Survey ===
The Schwartz Value Survey (SVS) reports values of participants explicitly, by asking them to conduct a self-assessment. The survey entails 57 questions with two lists of value items. The first list consist of 30 nouns, while the second list contains 26 or 27 items in an adjective form. Each item is followed by a brief description for clarification. Out of the 57 questions, 45 are used to compute the 10 different value types – the number of items to measure a certain value varies according to the conceptual breadth. The remaining 12 items are used to allow better standardization in calculation of an individual's value. The importance of each of value item is measured on a non-symmetrical scale in order to encourage the respondents to think about each of the questions.

- 7 (supreme importance)
- 6 (very important)
- 5, 4 (unlabeled)
- 3 (important)
- 2, 1 (unlabeled)
- 0 (not important)
- −1 (opposed to my values)

The survey has been conducted so far on more than 60,000 individuals in 64 nations.

=== Portrait Values Questionnaire ===
The Portrait Values Questionnaire (PVQ) has been developed as an alternative to the SVS. The PVQ has been created primarily for children from 11–14, however, it has also shown to produce coherent results when given to adults. In comparison to the SVS the PVQ relies on indirect reporting. Hereby, the respondent is asked to compare himself/herself (gender-matched) with short verbal portraits of 40 different people. After each portrait the responded has to state how similar he or she is to the portrait person ranging from "very much like me" to "not like me at all". This way of research allows to how the individual actually acts rather than research what values are important to an individual. Similar to the SVS the portraits for each value varies according to the conceptual breath.

== Ordering and group differences ==
The order of Schwartz's traits are substantially stable amongst adults over time. Migrants' values tend to change when they move to a new country, but the order of preferences is still quite stable. Parenthood often causes women to shift their values towards stability and away from openness-to-change, but this change does not typically occur in fathers.

In general, men are found to value achievement, self-direction, hedonism, and stimulation more than women, while women value benevolence, universality and tradition higher.

== Relationship to personality ==
Personality traits using the big 5 measure correlate with Schwartz's value construct. Openness and extraversion correlates with the values related to openness-to-change (openness especially with self-direction, extraversion especially with stimulation); agreeableness correlates with self-transcendence values (especially benevolence); extraversion is correlated with self-enhancement and negatively with traditional values. Conscientiousness correlates with achievement, conformity and security.

== Limitations ==
One of the main limitations of this theory lies in the methodology of the research. The SVS is comparatively difficult to answer, because respondents have to first read the set of 30 value items and give one value the highest as well as the lowest ranking (0 or −1, depending on whether an item is opposed to their values). As completing one questionnaire takes approximately 12 minutes, a significant number of forms are submitted incomplete.

Furthermore, many respondents have a tendency to give the majority of the values a high score, resulting in a skewed responses to the upper end. However, this issue can be mitigated by providing respondents with an additional filter to evaluate the items they marked with high scores. When administering the Schwartz Value Survey in a coaching setting, respondents are coached to distinguish between a "must-have" value and a "meaningful" value. A "must-have" value is a value you have acted on or thought about in the previous 24 hours (this value item would receive a score of 6 or 7 on the Schwartz scale). A "meaningful" value is something you have acted on or thought about recently, but not in the previous 24 hours (this value item would receive a score of 5 or less).

Another methodological limitation are the resulting ordinal, ipsatised scores that limit the type of useful analyses researchers can perform.

== Practical applications ==
Recent studies advocate that values can influence the audience's reaction to advertising appeals. Moreover, in the case that a choice and a value are intervened, people tend to pick the choice that aligns more with their own values. Therefore, models such as the theory of basic human values could be seen as increasingly important for international marketing campaigns, as they can help to understand values and how values vary between cultures. This is shown to be especially true when taken in conjunction with studies that prove moral values to be one of the most powerful explanations of consumer behaviour. Understanding the different values and underlying, defining goals can also help organizations to better motivate staff in an rapidly changing work environment and create an effective organizational structure.

Schwartz's work—and that of Geert Hofstede—has been applied to economics research. Specifically, the performance of the economies as it relates to entrepreneurship and business (firm) creation. This has significant implications to economic growth and might help explain why some countries are lagging behind others when labor, natural resources, and governing institutions are equal. This is a relatively new field of study in economics; however the recent empirical results suggest that culture plays a significant role in the success of entrepreneurial efforts across countries—even ones with largely similar governmental structures. Francisco Liñán and José Fernandez-Serrano found that these cultural attributes accounted for 60% of the difference in Gross Domestic Product (GDP) variance per capita in countries within the European Union (EU).

== See also ==
- Inglehart–Welzel cultural map of the world
- Moral foundations theory
- Rokeach Value Survey
- Self-expression values
- World Values Survey
