= Reverse post-material thesis =

Academic theory regarding far-right politics

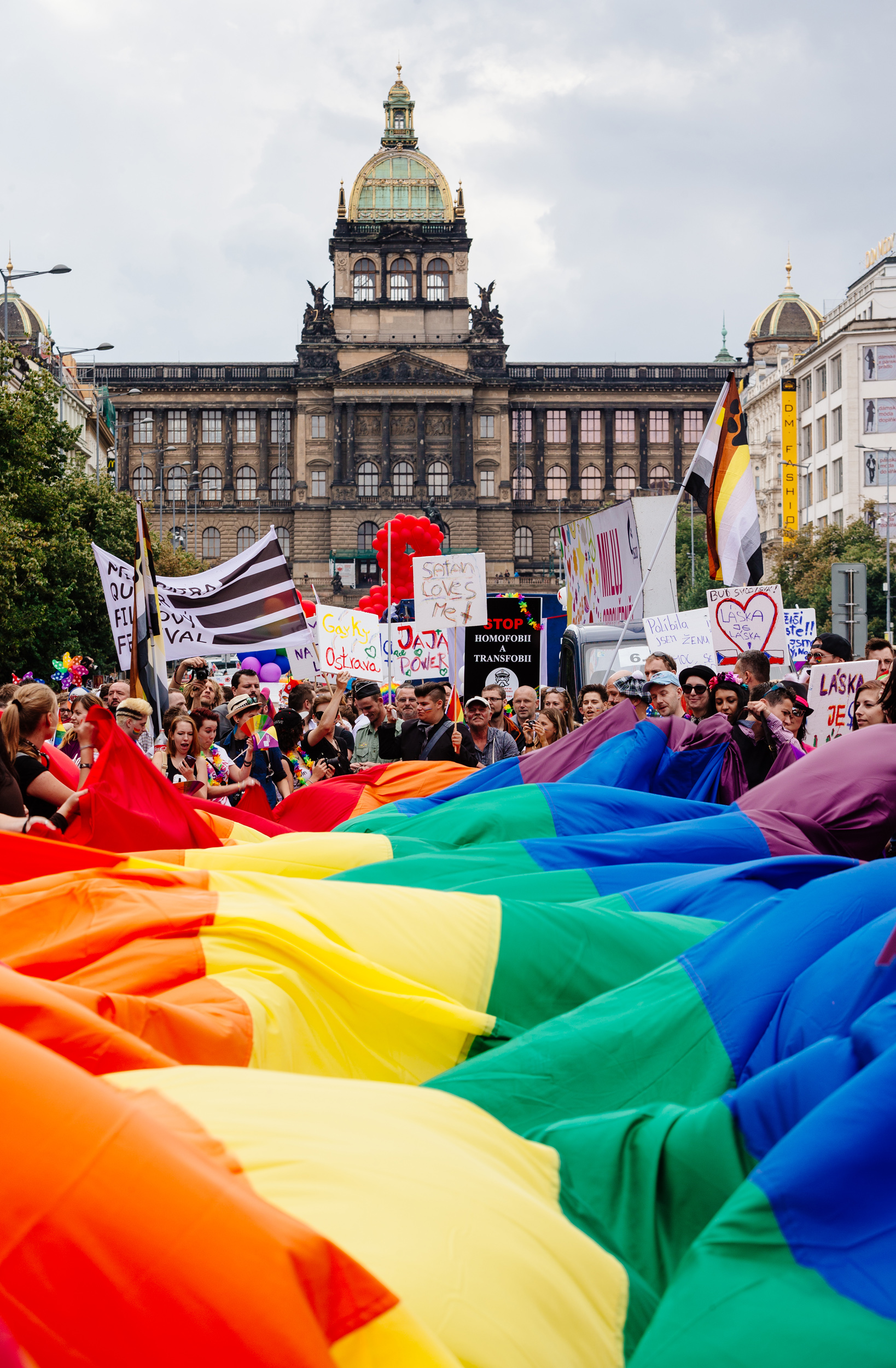
The reverse post-material thesis argues that the far-right have increased in support as a result of mainstream parties embracing issues such as LGBT rights (pictured) rather than traditional class interests.

The reverse post-material thesis or reverse post-materialism thesis is an academic theory used to explain support for far-right political parties and right-wing populist political parties. The thesis is modelled on the post-material thesis from sociology that has been used to explain the shift in Western societies from traditional economic interests towards issues such as environmentalism and feminism.

== Core premise ==
The thesis begins from the premise that, during the 1970s and 1980s, centre-left parties embraced a post-material agenda, with less concern for traditional class and economic interests and greater concern for issues such as feminism, environmentalism, liberal internationalist values, and LGBT rights and other sexual freedoms. Bornschier argues that the "populist right’s ideological core consists of opposition to the process of societal modernization that has accelerated since the 1960s". According to this thesis, this post-material agenda, while more likely to appeal to the young and the more educated voters, is seen as irrelevant to material concerns, particularly of working-class unskilled males.

== Criticism ==
Roger Eatwell argues that the reverse post-material thesis is insufficient to explain local variations in support for extreme-right parties — for instance, to explain why the British National Party did well in Oldham at the 2001 General Election but relatively poorly in neighbouring Blackburn. Merkel and Weinberg argue that, in Europe, post-material values are strongest in Germany, Scandinavia, and the Netherlands, but as the extreme-right is generally weaker in these countries, the post-material thesis is insufficient on its own as an explanation for far-right support.

Pisoiu and Ahmed argue that the French National Front and Flemish Interest (Vlaams Belang) in fact have an anti-materialist philosophy that prioritises political issues over economic concerns.
