= Ronald Inglehart =

American political scientist (1934–2021)

- Born: 5 September 1934
- Died: 8 May 2021 (aged 86)
- Known for: Inglehart–Welzel cultural map of the world; World Values Survey
- Awards: Johan Skytte Prize in Political Science (2011)

Academic background
- Education: Northwestern University (BA); University of Chicago (MA, PhD)
- Influences: Sidney Verba

Academic work
- Discipline: Political science
- Sub-discipline: Comparative politics
- School or tradition: Political Culture
- Institutions: University of Michigan
- Main interests: Modernization theory; Democratization
- Influenced: Pippa Norris, Christian Welzel

Ronald F. Inglehart (September 5, 1934 – May 8, 2021) was an American political scientist specializing in comparative politics. He was director of the World Values Survey, a global network of social scientists who have carried out representative national surveys of the publics of over 100 societies on all six inhabited continents, containing 90 percent of the world's population. The first wave of surveys for this project was carried out in 1981 and the latest wave was completed in 2019. From 2010, Inglehart also was co-director of the Laboratory for Comparative Social Research at the National Research University Higher School of Economics in Moscow and St Petersburg. Inglehart died on 8 May 2021.

Using data from the World Values Survey, he created a model of cultural dimensions which has two axes: secular-rational values versus traditional values and self-expression values versus survival values. The data has been often visualized in the form of the Inglehart–Welzel cultural map of the world, which has been described as "one of the most famous pieces of Inglehart's research tradition".

In the seventies, Inglehart began developing an influential theory of Generational Replacement causing intergenerational value change from materialist to post-materialist values that helped shape the Eurobarometer Surveys, the World Values Surveys and other cross-national survey projects. Building on this work, he subsequently developed a revised version of Modernization theory, Evolutionary Modernization Theory, which argues that economic development, welfare state institutions and the long peace between major powers since 1945, are reshaping human motivations in ways that have important implications concerning gender roles, sexual norms, the role of religion, economic behavior and the spread of democracy.

Inglehart is among the most cited political scientists, with 94,125 citations as of 2019.

== Writings ==
Ronald Inglehart's numerous writings have become extremely influential, with translations published in German, Italian, Spanish, French, Swedish, Brazilian Portuguese, Russian, Polish, Croatian, Japanese, Chinese, Vietnamese, Korean, Persian, Urdu and Indonesian. Brief descriptions of some of his most influential works include:

=== The Silent Revolution ===
In The Silent Revolution (1977) Inglehart discovered a major intergenerational shift in the values of the populations of advanced industrial societies.

=== Culture Shift in Advanced Industrial Society ===
Culture Shift in Advanced Industrial Society (Princeton: Princeton University Press, 1990). Economic, technological, and socio-political changes have been transforming the cultures of advanced industrial societies in profoundly important ways during the past few decades. This ambitious work examines changes in religious beliefs, in motives for work, in the issues that give rise to political conflict, in the importance people attach to having children and families, and in attitudes toward divorce, abortion, and homosexuality. Ronald Inglehart's earlier book, The Silent Revolution (Princeton, 1977), broke new ground by discovering a major intergenerational shift in the values of the populations of advanced industrial societies. This new volume demonstrates that this value shift is part of a much broader process of cultural change that is gradually transforming political, economic, and social life in these societies. Inglehart uses a massive body of time-series survey data from twenty-six nations, gathered from 1970 through 1988, to analyze the cultural changes that are occurring as younger generations gradually replace older ones in the adult population. These changes have far-reaching political implications, and they seem to be transforming the economic growth rates of societies and the kind of economic development that is pursued.

=== Modernization and Postmodernization ===
In Modernization and Postmodernization (1997) Inglehart argued that economic development, cultural change, and political change go together in coherent and, to some extent, predictable patterns. Inglehart theorised that industrialization leads to related changes such as mass mobilization and diminishing differences in gender roles. Changes in worldviews seem to reflect changes in the economic and political environment, but take place with a generational time lag. Following industrialization, advanced industrial society leads to a basic shift in values, de-emphasizing instrumental rationality. Postmodern values then bring new societal changes, including democratic political institutions and the decline of state socialist regimes.

=== Rising Tide ===
Written with Pippa Norris, Rising Tide: Gender Equality and Cultural Change Around the World (New York and Cambridge: Cambridge University Press, 2003) examines how the twentieth century gave rise to profound changes in traditional sex roles. This study reveals how modernization has changed cultural attitudes towards gender equality and analyzes the political consequences. It systematically compares attitudes towards gender equality worldwide, comparing almost 70 nations, ranging from rich to poor, agrarian to post-industrial. This volume is essential reading to gain a better understanding of issues in comparative politics, public opinion, political behavior, development and sociology.

=== Sacred and Secular ===
Inglehart's 2004 book with Pippa Norris, Sacred and Secular: Religion and Politics Worldwide re-examines the secularization thesis. This book draws on a base of new evidence generated by four waves of the World Values Survey executed from 1981 to 2001 in eighty societies, covering most of the world's major faiths. Examining religiosity from a broader perspective and in a wider range of countries than have been done before, this book argues that religiosity persists most strongly among vulnerable populations, especially those in poorer nations and in failed states, facing personal survival-threatening risks. Exposure to physical, societal and personal risks drives religiosity. Conversely, a systematic erosion of traditional religious practices, values and beliefs may have occurred among the more prosperous strata in rich nations. But at the same time, a growing proportion of the population—in both rich and poor countries—spends time thinking about the meaning and purpose of life. It is argued that in developed countries, the established churches are losing their ability to tell people how to live their lives, but spiritual concerns, broadly defined, may be becoming increasingly important.

=== Modernization, Cultural Change and Democracy ===
Written with Christian Welzel, Modernization, Cultural Change and Democracy: The Human Development Sequence (2005) demonstrates that people's basic values and beliefs are changing, in ways that affect their political, sexual, economic, and religious behavior. These changes are roughly predictable because they can be interpreted on the basis of a revised version of modernization theory presented here. Drawing on evidence from societies containing 85% of the world's population, the authors argue that modernization is a process of human development, in which economic development triggers cultural changes that make individual autonomy, gender equality, and democracy increasingly likely.

=== Cosmopolitan Communications ===
Written with Pippa Norris. In Cosmopolitan Communications: Cultural Diversity in a Globalized World (New York and Cambridge: Cambridge University Press, 2009) he argues that societies around the world have experienced a flood of information from diverse channels originating beyond local communities and even national borders, transmitted through the rapid expansion of cosmopolitan communications. For more than half a century, conventional interpretations, Norris and Inglehart argue, have commonly exaggerated the potential threats arising from this process. A series of fire-walls protect national cultures. This book develops a new theoretical framework for understanding cosmopolitan communications and uses it to identify the conditions under which global communications are most likely to endanger cultural diversity. The authors analyze empirical evidence from both the societal level and the individual level, examining the outlook and beliefs of people in a wide range of societies. The study draws on evidence from the World Values Survey, covering 90 societies in all major regions worldwide from 1981 to 2007. The conclusion considers the implications of their findings for cultural policies.

=== Cultural Evolution ===
The book Cultural Evolution: People's Motivations Are Changing, and Reshaping the World (Cambridge University Press, 2018) updates the results and theories published in Inglehart's previous books, presenting the first full statement of Inglehart's Evolutionary Modernization theory, describing how social values and human priorities have evolved through history as a consequence of rising existential security. The book culminates with an explanation of the recent rise of xenophobic authoritarian populist parties, driven by rapid cultural change, large-scale immigration and rapidly-rising economic inequality due to an inherent tendency for knowledge societies to have winner-takes-all economies. On December 16, 2018, Fareed Zakaria chose Cultural Evolution as his book of the week, describing it as "really brilliant work. The presentation is based on longitudinal survey data from more than a hundred countries in the World Values Survey collected in six waves from 1981 to 2014. Evolutionary modernization theory holds that economic and physical insecurity elicits an authoritarian reflex leading to xenophobia, strong in-group solidarity, authoritarian politics and rigid adherence to traditional cultural norms. Modernization and economic development have led to a degree of security in many countries after World War II where people take survival for granted. This has led to decreasing authoritarianism and the rise of Postmaterialist Values: egalitarian norms, secularization, tolerance of foreigners, gender equality, and tolerance of divorce, homosexuality, and abortion. The existential security and the egalitarian norms that develop under the feeling of security are necessary for democracy to develop. The freedom of choice in postmaterialist societies also leads to improved happiness. Inglehart now sees a backlash in terms of increasing authoritarianism, political populism, and erosion of democracy as a consequence of the decreasing economic security that follows the growing economic inequality.

=== Trump and the Populist Authoritarian Parties: The Silent Revolution in Reverse. ===
The essay 'Trump and the populist authoritarian parties: the silent revolution in reverse' is a piece co-written by Ronald Inglehart and Pippa Norris and explores the themes that led to the rise in Populist parties in the modern world. This is explored through various examples, such as Brexit, France's National Party and the rise of Trumpism in the Republican Party in the USA. Inglehart states that the economic gains of the last 3 decades have gone almost entirely to those at the top, whilst those lower down the ladder have instead dealt with declining real wages as well as cutting costs decreasing the security of their jobs. Inglehart and Norris also explain two questions that arise during their piece, the first being what motivates people to support populist parties, and why have the votes for populist parties risen so high compared to three decades ago.

== Awards and recognitions ==
Inglehart has received the following honors:

- Doctor, honoris causa, Uppsala University, Sweden, 2006.
- Doctor, honoris causa, Free University of Brussels, Belgium, 2010.
- Doctor, honoris causa, University of Lüneburg, Germany, 2012
- Fellow, The American Academy of Political and Social Science
- Fellow, The American Academy of Arts and Sciences
- Winner of Johan Skytte prize in Political Science, 2011.

== Bibliography ==
Inglehart has written more than 250 publications, including:

- The Silent Revolution, Princeton University Press, 1977.
- Culture Shift in Advanced Industrial Society, Princeton University Press, 1990.
- Value Change in Global Perspective, University of Michigan Press, 1995 (with Paul R. Abramson).
- Modernization and Postmodernization, Princeton University Press, 1997.
- (with Wayne Baker) "Modernization, Cultural Change and the Persistence of Traditional Values." American Sociological Review. (February, 2000).
- Rising Tide: Gender Equality and Cultural Change around the World, Cambridge University Press, 2003 (co-authored with Pippa Norris).
- Human Beliefs and Values: A Cross-Cultural Sourcebook based on the 1999–2002 values Surveys. Mexico City: Siglo XXI, 2004 (co-edited with Miguel Basanez, Jaime Deiz-Medrano, Loek Halman and Ruud Luijkx).
- Sacred and Secular: Religion and Politics Worldwide, Cambridge University Press, 2004 (co-authored with Pippa Norris).
- Inglehart, Ronald & Welzel, Christian (2005), Modernization, Cultural Change and Democracy: The Human Development Sequence, New York: Cambridge University Press, ISBN 9780521846950.
- Cultural Evolution: People's Motivations are Changing, and Reshaping the World, Cambridge University Press, 2018, ISBN 9781108489317.
- Norris, Pippa; Inglehart, Ronald (2019). Cultural Backlash: Trump, Brexit, and Authoritarian Populism. Cambridge: Cambridge University Press. ISBN 978-1-108-42607-7. https://www.cambridge.org/core/books/cultural-backlash/3C7CB32722C7BB8B19A0FC005CAFD02B
- "Giving Up on God: The Global Decline of Religion", Foreign Affairs, vol. 99, no. 5 (September / October 2020), pp. 110–118. "From 2007 to 2019, only five countries [studied] became more religious, whereas the vast majority [...] moved in the opposite direction. [...] India is the most important exception to the [...] declining religiosity. [...] The most dramatic shift away from religion has taken place [in the US]." (p. 112.) In the past, "Religion emphasized the importance of fertility because [...] [i]n the world of high infant mortality and low life expectancy that prevailed until recently, the average woman had to produce five to eight children [...] to simply replace the population." (p. 115.) "[W]hen a society reached a sufficiently high level of economic and physical security, younger generations grew up taking that security for granted, and the norms around fertility receded." (p. 116.) "Countries with low levels of economic and physical security tend to have high levels of religiosity and also high levels of corruption." (p. 117.)
- Religion's Sudden Decline: What's Causing it, and What Comes Next? Oxford University Press; 2021, ISBN 9780197547045.
