= Modernization theory =

Explanation for the process of modernization within societies

Modernization theory, or modernisation theory, is a sociological and comparative political science theory positing that processes of structural socioeconomic development, including industrialization, urbanization, rising per capita income, and rising levels of education, generate systematic transformations in political culture, institutional structure, and value systems, culminating in the consolidation of liberal-democratic governance and rationalist-bureaucratic forms of authority. The "classical" theories of modernization of the 1950s and 1960s, most influentially articulated by Seymour Lipset, drew on sociological analyses of Karl Marx, Émile Durkheim, Max Weber, and Talcott Parsons. Modernization theory was a dominant paradigm in the social sciences in the 1950s and 1960s, and saw a resurgence after 1991, when Francis Fukuyama wrote about the end of the Cold War as confirmation of modernization theory.

The theory is the subject of much debate among scholars. Critics have highlighted cases where industrialization did not prompt stable democratization, such as Japan, Germany, and the Soviet Union, as well as cases of democratic backsliding in economically advanced parts of Latin America. Other critics argue the causal relationship is reverse (democracy is more likely to lead to economic modernization) or that economic modernization helps democracies survive but does not prompt democratization. Other scholars provide supporting evidence, showing that economic development significantly predicts democratization.

== History ==
The modernization theory of the 1950s and 1960s drew on classical evolutionary theory and a Parsonian reading of Weber's ideas about a transition from traditional to modern society. Parsons had translated Weber's works into English in the 1930s and provided his own interpretation.

After 1945, the Parsonian version became widely used in sociology and other social sciences. Some of the thinkers associated with modernization theory are Marion J. Levy Jr., Gabriel Almond, Seymour Martin Lipset, Walt Rostow, Daniel Lerner, Lucian Pye, David Apter, Alex Inkeles, Cyril Edwin Black, Bert F. Hoselitz, Myron Weiner, and Karl Deutsch.

By the late 1960s opposition to modernization theory developed because the theory was too general and did not fit all societies in quite the same way. Yet, with the end of the Cold War, a few attempts to revive modernization theory were carried out. Francis Fukuyama argued for the use of modernization theory as universal history. A more academic effort to revise modernization theory was that of Ronald Inglehart and Christian Welzel in Modernization, Cultural Change, and Democracy (2005). Inglehart and Welzel amended the 1960s version of modernization theory in significant ways. Counter to Lipset, who associated industrial growth with democratization, Inglehart and Welzel did not see an association between industrialization and democratization. Rather, they held that only at a latter stage in the process of economic modernization, which various authors have characterized as post-industrial, did values conducive to democratization – which Inglehart and Welzel call "self-expression values" – emerge.

Nonetheless, these efforts to revive modernization theory were criticized by many, and the theory remained a controversial one.

== Modernization and democracy ==
The relationship between modernization and democracy or democratization is one of the most researched studies in comparative politics. Many studies show that modernization has contributed to democracy in some countries. For example, Seymour Martin Lipset argued that modernization can turn into democracy. There is academic debate over the drivers of democracy because there are theories that support economic growth as both a cause and effect of the institution of democracy. "Lipset's observation that democracy is related to economic development, first advanced in 1959, has generated the largest body of research on any topic in comparative politics,"

Anderson explains the idea of an elongated diamond in order to describe the concentration of power in the hands of a few at the top during an authoritarian leadership. He develops this by giving an understanding of the shift in power from the elite class to the middle class that occurs when modernization is incorporated. Socioeconomic modernization allows for a democracy to further develop and influences the success of a democracy. Concluded from this, is the idea that as socioeconomic levels are leveled, democracy levels would further increase.

Larry Diamond and Juan Linz, who worked with Lipset in the book, Democracy in Developing Countries: Latin America, argue that economic performance affects the development of democracy in at least three ways. First, they argue that economic growth is more important for democracy than given levels of socioeconomic development. Second, socioeconomic development generates social changes that can potentially facilitate democratization. Third, socioeconomic development promotes other changes, like organization of the middle class, which is conducive to democracy.

As Seymour Martin Lipset put it, "All the various aspects of economic development—industrialization, urbanization, wealth and education—are so closely interrelated as to form one major factor which has the political correlate of democracy". The argument also appears in Walt W. Rostow, Politics and the Stages of Growth (1971); A. F. K. Organski, The Stages of Political Development (1965); and David Apter, The Politics of Modernization (1965). In the 1960s, some critics argued that the link between modernization and democracy was based too much on the example of European history and neglected the Third World.

One historical problem with that argument has always been Germany, whose economic modernization in the 19th century came long before the democratization after 1918. Political science professor Berman, however, concludes that a process of democratization was underway in Imperial Germany, for "during these years Germans developed many of the habits and mores that are now thought by political scientists to augur healthy political development".

One contemporary problem for modernization theory is the argument of whether modernization implies more human rights for citizens or not. China, one of the most rapidly growing economies in the world, can be observed as an example. The modernization theory implies that this should correlate to democratic growth in some regards, especially in relation to the liberalization of the middle and lower classes. However, active human rights abuses and constant oppression of Chinese citizens by the government seem to contradict the theory strongly. Interestingly enough, the irony is that increasing restrictions on Chinese citizens are a result of modernization theory.

In the 1990s, the Chinese government wanted to reform the legal system and emphasized governing the country by law. This led to a legal awakening for citizens as they were becoming more educated on the law, yet more understanding of their inequality in relation to the government. Looking down the line in the 2000s, Chinese citizens saw even more opportunities to liberalize and were able to be a part of urbanization and could access higher levels of education. This in turn resulted in the attitudes of the lower and middle classes changing to more liberal ideas, which went against the CCP. Over time, this has led to their active participation in civil society activities and similar adjacent political groups in order to make their voices heard. Consequently, the Chinese government represses Chinese citizens at a more aggressive rate, all due to modernization theory.

Ronald Inglehart and Christian Welzel contend that the realization of democracy is not based solely on an expressed desire for that form of government, but democracies are born as a result of the admixture of certain social and cultural factors. They argue the ideal social and cultural conditions for the foundation of a democracy are born of significant modernization and economic development that result in mass political participation.

Randall Peerenboom explores the relationships among democracy, the rule of law and their relationship to wealth by pointing to examples of Asian countries, such as Taiwan and South Korea, which have successfully democratized only after economic growth reached relatively high levels and to examples of countries such as the Philippines, Bangladesh, Cambodia, Thailand, Indonesia and India, which sought to democratize at lower levels of wealth but have not done as well.

Adam Przeworski and others have challenged Lipset's argument. They say political regimes do not transition to democracy as per capita incomes rise. Rather, democratic transitions occur randomly, but once there, countries with higher levels of gross domestic product per capita remain democratic. Epstein et al. (2006) retest the modernization hypothesis using new data, new techniques, and a three-way, rather than dichotomous, classification of regimes. Contrary to Przeworski, this study finds that the modernization hypothesis stands up well. Partial democracies emerge as among the most important and least understood regime types.

Daron Acemoglu and James A. Robinson (2008) further weaken the case for Lipset's argument by showing that even though there is a strong cross-country correlation between income and democracy, once one controls for country fixed effects and removes the association between income per capita and various measures of democracy, there is "no causal effect of income on democracy." In "Non-Modernization" (2022), they further argue that modernization theory cannot account for various paths of political development "because it posits a link between economics and politics that is not conditional on institutions and culture and that presumes a definite endpoint—for example, an 'end of history'."

Sirianne Dahlum and Carl Henrik Knutsen offer a test of the Ronald Inglehart and Christian Welzel revised version of modernization theory, which focuses on cultural traits triggered by economic development that are presumed to be conducive to democratization. They find "no empirical support" for the Inglehart and Welzel thesis and conclude that "self-expression values do not enhance democracy levels or democratization chances, and neither do they stabilize existing democracies."

A meta-analysis by Gerardo L. Munck of research on Lipset's argument shows that a majority of studies do not support the thesis that higher levels of economic development leads to more democracy.

== Modernization and economic development ==
Modernization theorists often saw traditions as obstacles to economic development. According to Seymour Martin Lipset, economic conditions are heavily determined by the cultural, social values present in that given society. Furthermore, while modernization might deliver violent, radical change for traditional societies, it was thought worth the price. Critics insist that traditional societies were often destroyed without ever gaining the promised advantages. Others point to improvements in living standards, physical infrastructure, education and economic opportunity to refute such criticisms.

Modernization theorists such as Samuel P. Huntington held in the 1960s and 1970s that authoritarian regimes yielded greater economic growth than democracies. However, this view had been challenged. In Democracy and Development: Political Institutions and Well-Being in the World, 1950–1990 (2000), Adam Przeworski argued that "democracies perform as well economically as do authoritarian regimes." A study by Daron Acemoglu, Suresh Naidu, Pascual Restrepo, and James A. Robinson shows that "democracy has a positive effect on GDP per capita."

== Modernization and globalization ==
Globalization can be defined as the integration of economic, political and social cultures. It is argued that globalization is related to the spreading of modernization across borders.

Global trade has grown continuously since the European discovery of new continents in the early modern period; it increased particularly as a result of the Industrial Revolution and the mid-20th century adoption of the intermodal container.

Annual trans-border tourist arrivals rose to 456 million by 1990 and almost tripled since, reaching a total of over 1.2 billion in 2016. Communication is another major area that has grown due to modernization. Communication industries have enabled capitalism to spread throughout the world. Telephony, television broadcasts, news services and online service providers have played a crucial part in globalization. Former U.S. president Lyndon B. Johnson was a supporter of the modernization theory and believed that television had potential to provide educational tools in development.

With the many apparent positive attributes to globalization there are also negative consequences. The dominant, neoliberal model of globalization often increases disparities between a society's rich and its poor. In major cities of developing countries there exist pockets where technologies of the modernised world, computers, cell phones and satellite television, exist alongside stark poverty. Globalists are globalization modernization theorists and argue that globalization is positive for everyone, as its benefits must eventually extend to all members of society, including vulnerable groups such as women and children.

== Applications ==
=== United States foreign aid in the 1960s ===
President John F. Kennedy (1961–1963) relied on economists W.W. Rostow on his staff and outsider John Kenneth Galbraith for ideas on how to promote rapid economic development in the "Third World", as it was called at the time. They promoted modernization models in order to reorient American aid to Asia, Africa and Latin America. In the Rostow version in his The Stages of Economic Growth (1960) progress must pass through five stages, and for underdeveloped world the critical stages were the second one, the transition, the third stage, the takeoff into self-sustaining growth. Rostow argued that American intervention could propel a country from the second to the third stage he expected that once it reached maturity, it would have a large energized middle class that would establish democracy and civil liberties and institutionalize human rights. The result was a comprehensive theory that could be used to challenge Marxist ideologies, and thereby repel communist advances. The model provided the foundation for the Alliance for Progress in Latin America, the Peace Corps, Food for Peace, and the Agency for International Development (AID). Kennedy proclaimed the 1960s the "Development Decade" and substantially increased the budget for foreign assistance. Modernization theory supplied the design, rationale, and justification for these programs. The goals proved much too ambitious, and the economists in a few years abandoned the European-based modernization model as inappropriate to the cultures they were trying to impact.

Kennedy and his top advisers were working from implicit ideological assumptions regarding modernization. They firmly believed modernity was not only good for the target populations, but was essential to avoid communism on the one hand or extreme control of traditional rural society by the very rich landowners on the other. They believed America had a duty, as the most modern country in the world, to promulgate this ideal to the poor nations of the Third World. They wanted programs that were altruistic, and benevolent—and also tough, energetic, and determined. It was benevolence with a foreign policy purpose. Michael Latham has identified how this ideology worked out in three major programs: the Alliance for Progress, the Peace Corps, and the strategic hamlet program in South Vietnam. However, Latham argues that the ideology was a non-coercive version of the modernization goals of the imperialistic of Britain, France and other European countries in the 19th century.

== Criticisms and alternatives ==
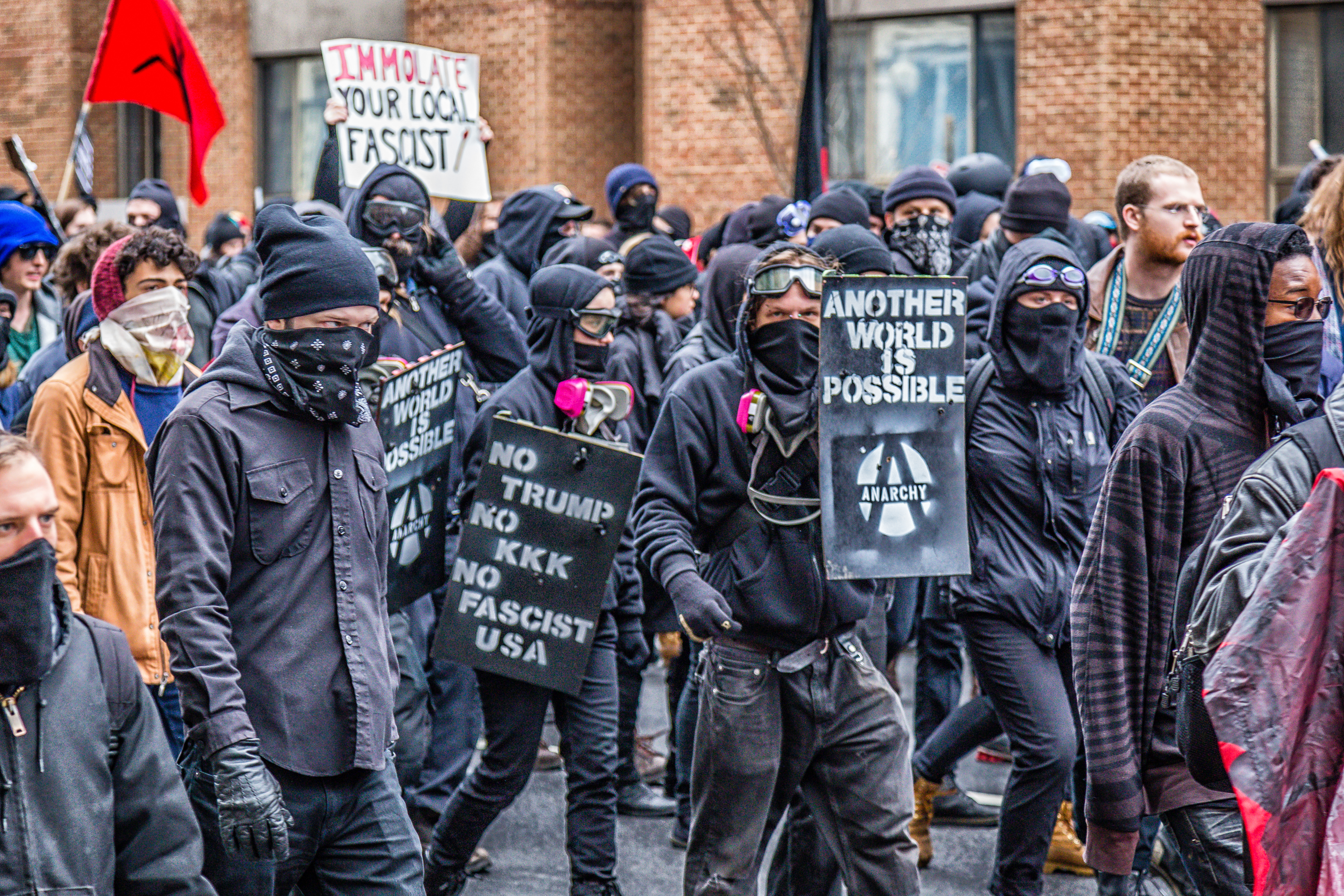
Anarchist protest against Trump and democratic backsliding in the United States

From the 1970s, modernization theory has been criticized by numerous scholars, including Andre Gunder Frank (1929–2005) and Immanuel Wallerstein (1930–2019). In this model, the modernization of a society required the destruction of the indigenous culture and its replacement by a more Westernized one. By one definition, modern simply refers to the present, and any society still in existence is therefore modern. Proponents of modernization typically view only Western society as being truly modern and argue that others are primitive or unevolved by comparison. That view sees unmodernized societies as inferior even if they have the same standard of living as western societies. Opponents argue that modernity is independent of culture and can be adapted to any society. Japan is cited as an example by both sides. Some see it as proof that a thoroughly modern way of life can exist in a non western society. Others argue that Japan has become distinctly more Western as a result of its modernization.

As Tipps has argued, by conflating modernization with other processes, with which theorists use interchangeably (democratization, liberalization, development), the term becomes imprecise and therefore difficult to disprove.

The theory has also been criticised empirically, as modernization theorists ignore external sources of change in societies. The binary between traditional and modern is unhelpful, as the two are linked and often interdependent, and "modernization" does not come as a whole.

Modernization theory has also been accused of being Eurocentric, as modernization began in Europe, with the Industrial Revolution, the French Revolution and the Revolutions of 1848 and has long been regarded as reaching its most advanced stage in Europe. Anthropologists typically make their criticism one step further and say that the view is ethnocentric and is specific to Western culture.

=== Dependency theory ===
One alternative model is dependency theory. It emerged in the 1950s and argues that the underdevelopment of poor nations in the Third World derived from systematic imperial and neo-colonial exploitation of raw materials. Its proponents argue that resources typically flow from a "periphery" of poor and underdeveloped states to a "core" of wealthy states, enriching the latter at the expense of the former. It is a central contention of dependency theorists such as Andre Gunder Frank that poor states are impoverished and rich ones enriched by the way poor states are integrated into the "world system".

Dependency models arose from a growing association of southern hemisphere nationalists (from Latin America and Africa) and Marxists. It was their reaction against modernization theory, which held that all societies progress through similar stages of development, that today's underdeveloped areas are thus in a similar situation to that of today's developed areas at some time in the past, and that, therefore, the task of helping the underdeveloped areas out of poverty is to accelerate them along this supposed common path of development, by various means such as investment, technology transfers, and closer integration into the world market. Dependency theory rejected this view, arguing that underdeveloped countries are not merely primitive versions of developed countries, but have unique features and structures of their own; and, importantly, are in the situation of being the weaker members in a world market economy.

=== Barrington Moore and comparative historical analysis ===
Another line of critique of modernization theory was due to sociologist Barrington Moore Jr., in his Social Origins of Dictatorship and Democracy (1966). In this classic book, Moore argues there were at least "three routes to the modern world" - the liberal democratic, the fascist, and the communist - each deriving from the timing of industrialization and the social structure at the time of transition. Counter to modernization theory, Moore held that there was not one path to the modern world and that economic development did not always bring about democracy.

=== Guillermo O'Donnell and bureaucratic authoritarianism ===
Political scientist Guillermo O'Donnell, in his Modernization and Bureaucratic Authoritarianism (1973) challenged the thesis, advanced most notably by Seymour Martin Lipset, that industrialization produced democracy. In South America, O'Donnell argued, industrialization generated not democracy, but bureaucratic authoritarianism.

=== Acemoglu and Robinson and institutional economics ===
Economists Daron Acemoglu and James A. Robinson (2022), argue that modernization theory cannot account for various paths of political development "because it posits a link between economics and politics that is not conditional on institutions and culture and that presumes a definite endpoint—for example, an 'end of history'." This argument fits with recent evidence that some cultural differences are actually widening as modernization progresses. The idea is that modernization can act like water to help cultural "seeds" grow because modernization gives people technology, resources, and options, which they choose to use in different ways based on their values and beliefs.

== See also ==
- Anti-modernization
- Bielefeld School
- Consumerism
- Democracy and economic growth
- Dependency theory
- Development criticism
- Ecological modernization
- Globalization
- Gwangmu Reform timeline
- Idea of Progress
- Lee thesis
- Maslow's hierarchy of needs
- Mass society
- Mediatization (media)
- Modernism
- Modernization theory (Nationalism)
- Outline of organizational theory
- Progressive Era (US, early 20th century)
- Postmodernism
- Postmodernity
- Western education
