= Paul R. Abramson (political scientist) =

American political scientist (1937–2018)

- Born: Paul Robert Abramson; November 28, 1937; St. Louis, Missouri, US
- Died: February 12, 2018 (aged 80)
- Spouse: Janet (m. c. 1967)

Academic background
- Education: Washington University in St. Louis; University of California, Berkeley

Academic work
- Discipline: Political science
- Institutions: Michigan State University
- Main interests: American, European, and Israeli elections

Paul Robert Abramson (November 28, 1937 – February 12, 2018) was an American political scientist known for his research and writing on American, European, and Israeli elections. He was a professor of political science at Michigan State University.

Born on November 28, 1937, in St. Louis, Missouri, Abramson graduated Phi Beta Kappa from Washington University in St. Louis in 1959 and attended the University of California at Berkeley as a Woodrow Wilson Fellow in 1959–1960. He served as a lieutenant in the US Army between 1960 and 1962, earning an MA from the University of California in 1961 and a PhD in 1967. He joined the Michigan State University political science department as an assistant professor in 1967, was promoted to associate professor in 1971, and to professor in 1977. In 1996 he was one of twelve political scientists inducted into "The American Political Science Review Hall of Fame" for publishing ten or more articles in the American Political Science Review between 1954 and 1994. Abramson died on February 12, 2018.

== Select publications ==
Singly Authored Books:

- Generational Change in American Politics. 1975. Lexington Press. ISBN 0669977411.
- The Political Socialization of Black Americans. 1977. The Free Press. ISBN 9780029001707.
- Political Attitudes in America. 1983. W.H. Freeman & Co. ISBN 0716714205.
- Politics in the Bible. 2012. Transaction Publishers. ISBN 1412843103.
- David's Politics. 2016. Lexington Books. ISBN 1498545513.

Co-Authored Books:

- Value Change in Global Perspective. Coauthored with Ronald Inglehart. 1995. University of Michigan Press. ISBN 0472065912.
- A series of eighteen US presidential and congressional elections, the most recent of which is Change and Continuity in the 2012 and 2014 Elections. Coauthored with John H. Aldrich, Brad T. Gomez, and David Rohde. 2016. CQ Press. ISBN 1506305873.

Abramson has written or co-written 13 book chapters, and 77 journal articles including 13 in the American Political Science Review.
