= Generational replacement =

Generational replacement is a theory proposed by Paul R. Abramson and Ronald Inglehart that attributes changes in values between young people and their elders to their different circumstances growing up. Because people's formative experiences in pre-adult years tend to shape them throughout later life, if the younger birth cohorts in a given society have experienced fundamentally different conditions than those that shaped older birth cohorts, then there will be substantial and persisting differences between the basic values of older and younger generations. As the younger birth cohorts gradually replace the older ones over time, one will observe changes in the values and behavior of the population of that society.

The main cause of generational replacement in Abramson and Inglehart's article, "Generational Replacement and Value Change in Eight West European Societies", was the shift from materialist to postmaterialist values in advanced industrial societies. People concerned with "maintaining order" and "fighting rising prices" are classified as materialists, whilst "giving the people more say" and "freedom of speech" are classified as expressing postmaterialism.

This shift coincides with the post-1945 cohorts of Western societies that experienced increased prosperity, while the older cohorts had been shaped by economic and physical insecurity linked with the First World War, the Great Depression, and the Second World War.

== See also ==
- Intergenerational struggle
- Demographics
- Developmental psychology
- Post–World War II economic expansion
