= Shalom H. Schwartz =

Israeli psychologist (born 1936)

- שלום שוורץ
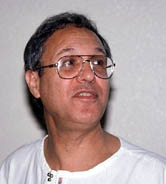
- Schwartz circa 2007
- Born: January 1, 1936 (age 90); Hempstead, New York, US
- Known for: Theory of basic human values
- Awards: Israel Prize in psychology (2007)

Academic background
- Education: Columbia University; Jewish Theological Seminary; University of Michigan
- Thesis: Moral Orientations And Interpersonal Conduct In Moral Encounters (1967)

Shalom Hillel Schwartz (Hebrew: שלום שוורץ; born January 1, 1936) is a social psychologist, cross-cultural researcher and creator of the Theory of Basic Human Values (universal values as latent motivations and goals). He also developed value scales to measure both individual and national/cultural values that have been translated into 50+ languages and applied in over 90 societies.

== Biography ==
Schwartz received his A.B. in comparative literature from Columbia University and B.H.L. in Jewish Theological Seminary. from After completing his master's degree in social psychology and group development at Columbia University and completing his rabbinical studies, Schwartz received his Ph.D. in social psychology from the University of Michigan in 1967. Subsequently, he taught in the sociology department of the University of Wisconsin–Madison, becoming a full professor in 1973. From 1971 to 73, Schwartz was a visiting lecturer in the department of psychology at the Hebrew University of Jerusalem. In 1979, Schwartz moved to Israel with his wife and three children. He joined the department of psychology at the Hebrew University, where he now holds the post of Leon and Clara Sznajderman Professor Emeritus of Psychology. From 2011 to 2016 he served as the Scientific Supervisor of the International Laboratory of Socio-Cultural Research at the National Research University-Higher School of Economics in Moscow, Russia. After retiring in 2003, he has continued his research and international collaborations on studies of values.

From 1967 to the 1980s, Schwartz carried out studies of altruism and helping behavior. In the 1980s, he developed his Theory of Basic Human Values together with Wofgang Bilsky, drawing upon some of the insights of Milton Rokeach and Louis Guttman. To enable application of the theory, he developed the Schwartz Value Survey and, later, various versions of the Portrait Values Questionnaire to measure the values of individuals and groups. In the 1990s, he proposed a theory of seven culture level values that could be used to map and compare the values of societies. In 2012, he expanded his theory of ten basic values to 19 more refined basic values that are recognized across cultures. His research has examined relations of values to political orientations, prosocial behavior, emotions, subjective well-being, everyday behavior, and national policies and more. He has also examined value differences among ethnic, gender, and religious groups, and countries, value development and change, value transmission, and value measurement.

Schwartz is a fellow of the American Psychological Association and is a member of the American Sociological Society, European Association of Experimental Social Psychology, the Israel Psychological Association, the Society for Experimental Social Psychology, the Society for Personality and Social Psychology and the International Association for Cross-Cultural Psychology of which he was president 2004–2006. Schwartz was a member of the scientific board of the European Social Survey from 1998 to 2016. The Human Values Scale that he developed for the Survey has been used in the semi-annual surveys of representative samples in Europe and elsewhere since the inception of the Survey.

== Awards ==
- 2019 Distinguished Scholar Award, Society for Personality and Social Psychology
- 2014 Distinguished Career Award of the American Sociological Association section of Altruism, Morality, and Social Solidarity
- 2011 Honorary Doctorate—The University of Helsinki
- 2010 Honorary Fellow of the International Association for Cross-Cultural Psychology
- In 2007, Schwartz was awarded the Israel Prize in psychology

== Main publications ==
- Schwartz, S. H. and Bilsky, W. (1990). Toward a theory of the universal content and structure of values: Extensions and cross cultural replications. Journal of Personality and Social Psychology, 58, 878–891.
- Schwartz, S. H. (1992). Universals in the content and structure of values: Theoretical advances and empirical tests in 20 countries. In M. Zanna (Ed.), Advances in experimental social psychology (Vol. 25) (pp. 1–65). New York: Academic Press.
- Schwartz, S. H. (1994). Are there universal aspects in the content and structure of values? Journal of Social Issues, 50, 19–45.
- Schwartz, S. H. (1996). Value priorities and behavior: Applying of theory of integrated value systems. In C. Seligman, J. M. Olson, & M. P. Zanna (Eds.), The Psychology of Values: The Ontario Symposium, Vol. 8 (pp. 1–24). Hillsdale, NJ: Erlbaum.
- Schwartz, S. H. and Bardi, A. (1997), ‘Influences of adaptation to communist rule on value priorities in Eastern Europe’, Political Psychology, 18, pp. 385–410.
- Schwartz, S. H., Lehmann, A., and Roccas, S. (1999), ‘Multimethod probes of basic human values’, in: J. Adamopoulos and Y. Kashima, (eds.), Social Psychology and Culture Context: Essays in Honor of Harry C. Triandis Newbury Park, CA: Sage.
- Schwartz, S. H. and Bardi, A. (2000). Moral dialogue across cultures: An empirical perspective. In E. W. Lehman (Ed.), Autonomy and order: A communitarian anthology. Lanham, MD: Rowman & Littlefield.
- Schwartz, S. H., Melech, G., Lehmann, A., Burgess, S., and Harris, M. (2001), ‘Extending the cross-cultural validity of the theory of basic human values with a different method of measurement’, Journal of Cross-Cultural Psychology, 32, pp. 519–542.
- Schwartz, S. H. A proposal for measuring value orientations across nations in ESS
- Schwartz, S. H. and Boehnke, K. (2004), ‘Evaluating the structure of human values with confirmatory factor analysis’, Journal of Research in Personality, 38, pp. 230–255.
- Schwartz, S. H., and Rubel, T. (2005), Sex differences in value priorities: Cross-cultural and multi-method studies. Journal of Personality and Social Psychology, 89, pp. 1010–1028.
- Schwartz, S. H. (2006). Value orientations: Measurement, antecedents and consequences across nations. In R. Jowell, C. Roberts, R. Fitzgerald, & G. Eva (Eds.), Measuring attitudes cross-nationally - lessons from the European Social Survey. London: Sage.
- Schwartz, S. H., Cieciuch, J., Vecchione, M., Davidov, E., Fischer, R., Beierlein, C., ... and Dirilen-Gumus, O. (2012). Refining the theory of basic individual values. Journal of Personality and Social Psychology, 103, pp. 663–688.
- Schwartz, S. H. (2014). Rethinking the concept and measurement of societal culture in light of empirical findings. Journal of Cross-Cultural Psychology, 45, 5–13. doi.org/10.1177/0022022113490830
- Schwartz, S. H. (2014). Societal value culture: Latent and dynamic. Journal of Cross-Cultural Psychology, 45, 42–46. doi.org/10.1177/0022022113513404
- Schwartz, S. H. (2014). National culture as value orientations: Consequences of value differences and cultural distance. In V. Ginsburgh & D. Throsby (Eds.), Handbook of the Economics of Art and Culture, Vol.2 (pp. 547–586). Elsevier/North Holland.
- Schwartz, S. H. (2014). National culture as value orientations: Consequences of value differences and cultural distance. In V. Ginsburgh & D. Throsby (Eds.), Handbook of the Economics of Art and Culture, Vol.2 (pp. 547–586). Elsevier/North Holland.
- Vecchione, M., Schwartz, S. H., Caprara, G. V., Schoen, H., Cieciuch, J., Silvester, J., Bain, P., Bianchi, G., Kirmanoglu, H., Baslevent, C., Mamali, C., Manzi, J., Pavlopoulos, V., Posnova, T., Torres, C., Verkasalo, M., Lönnqvist, J-E., Vondráková, E., Welzel, C., & Alessandri, G. (2015). Personal values and political activism: A cross-national study. British Journal of Psychology, 106, 84–106. doi: 10.1111/bjop.12067
- Schwartz, S. H. (2015). Cultural values influence and constrain economic and social change. In L. Harrison & Y. Yasin (Eds.), Culture matters: in Russia and everywhere (pp. 287–302). Boston: Lexington Books.
- Döring, A.K., Schwartz, S.H., Cieciuch, J., .... Bilsky, W. (2015). Cross-cultural evidence for universals in value structures and priorities in childhood. British Journal of Psychology, 106, 675–699. doi: 10.1111/bjop.12116
- Schwartz, S. H. (2016). Basic individual values: Sources and consequences. In D. Sander and T. Brosch (Eds.), Handbook of value (pp. 63–84). Oxford: UK, Oxford University Press. doi:10.1093/acprof:oso/9780198716600.003.0004
- Schwartz, S. H., Cieciuch, J., Vecchione, M., Torres, C., Dirilem-Gumus, O., & Butenko, T. (2017). Value tradeoffs and behavior in four countries: Validating 19 refined values. European Journal of Social Psychology, 47, 241–258. doi: 10.1002/ejsp.2228.
- Schwartz, S. H. (2017). Individual values across cultures. In A. T. Church (Ed.), The Praeger handbook of personality across cultures. Vol. 2 (pp. 121–153). Santa Barbara CA: Praeger.
- Tamir, M., Schwartz, S. H., Oishi, S., Kim, M. Y. (2017). The secret to happiness: feeling good or feeling right? Journal of Experimental Psychology: General, 146, 1069–1081. doi:10.1037/xge0000303
- Sagiv, L., Roccas, S., Cieciuch, J., & Schwartz, S. H. (2017). Personal values in human life. Nature Human Behaviour, 1, 630–639. doi: 10.1038/s41562-017-0185
- Schwartz, S. H., & Sortheix, F. M. (2018). Values and subjective well-being. In E. Diener, S. Oishi, & L. Tay (Eds.), Handbook of Well-Being (Noba Scholar Handbook series: Subjective well-being). DEF Publishers. http://www.nobascholar.com/chapters/51
- Knafo-Noam, A., Barni, D., & Schwartz, S. H. (2020). From "value transmission" to a complex but realistic model of parent-child value similarity: Reciprocal influences, genetics and environmental antecedents. In L. E. Jensen (Ed.) The Oxford handbook of moral development: an interdisciplinary perspective (Ch. 10). New York: Oxford University Press. Doi: 10.1093/oxfordhb/9780190676049.013.12
- Schwartz, S. H., & Cieciuch, J. (2022). Measuring the refined theory of individual values in 49 cultural groups: Psychometrics of the revised portrait value questionnaire. Assessment, 29, 1005–1019. doi.org/10.1177/1073191121998760
- Sagiv, L. & Schwartz, S. H. (2022). Personal values across cultures. Annual Review of Psychology, 73:1 doi:10.1146/annurev-psych-020821-125100

== See also ==
- List of Israel Prize recipients
