= World Social Capital Monitor =

- Founder: United Nations

The World Social Capital Monitor is an instrument for measuring social goods and social capital created by the United Nations Sustainable Development Group in partnership with civil society actors. The project identifies social values such as trust, solidarity, helpfulness, friendliness, hospitality and the willingness to finance public goods with the help of anonymous surveys. The surveys started in 2016 and so far 30,000 participants from 141 countries participated in the World Social Capital Monitor. The software for the World Social Capital Monitor was developed by the sociologist Alexander Dill of the Basel Institute of Commons and Economics and the computer scientist Nazmus Saquib of the Technical University of Munich. The findings are expected to provide new insights into the 17 Sustainable Development Goals (SDGs) and provide an alternative to traditional indices such as the Human Development Index, as they take into account intangible assets.

== Methodology ==
The monitor is using eight questions who can be rated on a scale from 1 to 10. 1 is the worst possible value (like lowest friendliness) and 10 represents the best possible value (like highest confidence).

- Climate (Please characterize the Social Climate of your place?)
- Trust (Trust among the people?)
- Measures (Will the people accept personal austerity measures in order to finance public goods like security, healthcare, education, environmental issues, infrastructure, social aid, public media, arts ?)
- Taxes (Will the people accept taxes and contributions to finance public goods like security, healthcare, education, environmental issues, infrastructure, social aid, public media, arts ?)
- Local invest (Are people willing to invest in national and regional assets like shares in cooperatives, national and local stocks, shares in SME (small and medium enterprises), own or family business ?)
- Helpfulness (Helpfulness across the people?)
- Friendliness (Friendliness of the people?)
- Hospitality (Hospitality of the people?)

== Results ==
Survey results in the 76 countries with sufficient data as of July 2019. Indicated are the average values from the answers of all persons to the corresponding question.

Country	'Climate (1–10)	Trust (1–10)	Measures (1–10)	Taxes (1–10)	Local invest (1–10)	Helpfulness (1–10)	Friendliness (1–10)	Hospitality (1–10)
Afghanistan	5.6	4.8	5.0	5.2	5.2	5.7	6.2	7.5
Albania	5.7	4.4	4.1	4.6	5.0	5.4	5.4	7.1
Algeria	5.9	6.0	4.8	4.0	4.9	7.0	6.6	8.0
Austria	6.4	5.8	5.1	6.1	5.7	6.6	6.7	6.3
Bangladesh	5.0	5.1	5.6	5.7	6.7	5.6	6.3	7.6
Belarus	5.4	6.0	4.9	5.6	3.9	6.7	7.6	8.0
Belgium	6.8	6.3	5.3	7.3	6.0	6.5	5.8	5.5
Benin	5.8	4.3	3.7	4.8	6.3	6.3	6.7	7.5
Bosnia and Herzegovina	5.1	4.7	4.3	4.3	4.1	6.3	6.6	7.0
Botswana	6.2	6.0	6.4	5.8	5.2	5.8	7.8	7.0
Brazil	5.0	4.5	5.0	3.5	5.4	5.3	5.5	5.6
Burkina Faso	5.2	5.7	5.3	5.6	5.8	6.7	6.7	7.7
Burundi	6.0	4.9	5.6	5.5	5.4	6.0	7.0	7.5
Cambodia	6.9	6.4	5.9	6.3	4.8	7.2	7.4	6.2
Cameroon	5.1	4.6	5.1	4.9	5.3	5.7	5.7	6.3
Central African Republic	6.3	6.3	6.7	5.8	7.9	7.4	8.4	8.0
Chile	5.3	3.5	3.5	2.8	4.5	6.0	6.3	6.5
Republic of the Congo	5.0	4.8	4.6	4.2	4.4	5.7	6.8	7.8
Democratic Republic of the Congo	5.5	4.9	5.3	5.3	5.3	6.1	7.5	7.8
Costa Rica	7.6	7.0	5.8	6.0	6.8	9.0	9.2	9.1
Croatia	5.7	4.2	4.5	4.5	4.2	6.3	6.5	7.1
Czech Republic	6.8	6.3	4.8	5.1	4.8	6.6	6.8	6.6
Egypt	6.9	6.7	5.0	5.3	7.1	7.3	7.8	8.9
Ethiopia	6.4	6.1	5.7	6.0	5.9	7.1	7.8	8.7
Finland	8.1	8.6	7.1	8.5	7.1	7.8	7.3	7.3
France	6.4	6.1	4.1	5.1	5.5	6.0	6.3	5.5
Gabon	6.0	5.3	4.5	4.9	5.0	5.8	5.9	5.7
Gambia	7.3	6.3	5.0	9.0	6.3	7.3	9.3	9.7
Germany	6.9	6.3	5.6	6.4	6.5	6.9	6.9	6.1
Ghana	4.6	4.2	4.1	5.0	5.6	6.0	7.6	6.0
Guinea	5.3	4.9	5.4	5.4	6.3	6.8	6.9	8.2
India	6.9	7.0	6.1	7.0	6.4	7.0	7.9	7.7
Iran	5.4	4.6	5.8	4.5	4.9	6.3	6.5	7.8
Ireland	7.8	7.8	7.5	8.0	6.3	8.5	8.5	7.8
Italy	6.5	5.6	4.8	5.0	5.1	6.8	6.1	5.7
Kenya	6.0	5.2	5.4	5.2	6.9	6.7	7.6	7.8
South Korea	6.5	5.5	3.9	6.6	6.3	6.1	5.6	6.6
Kosovo	5.8	5.3	4.9	5.7	5.3	6.4	5.9	7.7
Laos	7.0	7.0	6.5	6.5	5.5	7.0	7.4	8.1
Lebanon	6.3	5.0	4.7	3.7	6.7	8.0	8.7	9.7
Lesotho	4.2	4.4	7.4	5.8	6.8	5.4	6.8	7.2
Liberia	7.5	4.8	7.0	7.3	8.0	6.0	8.3	8.5
Madagascar	5.0	3.9	4.4	3.5	3.7	5.4	6.2	6.3
Malawi	5.0	4.1	4.5	3.6	3.9	5.4	6.1	6.4
Mauritius	6.6	6.0	5.2	5.8	6.6	6.6	7.2	6.8
Mali	6.9	6.3	4.7	5.6	5.9	7.6	8.1	8.4
Mexico	6.0	5.2	3.7	2.8	5.5	7.0	7.8	8.0
Montenegro	5.6	5.1	4.0	3.9	3.8	6.2	6.2	6.8
Namibia	5.5	5.5	6.3	6.5	6.8	7.8	9.3	8.8
Nepal	6.1	5.0	6.6	5.3	6.2	6.5	6.5	6.9
Netherlands	7.2	7.4	7.2	8.0	7.4	7.0	6.8	6.8
Nigeria	4.5	4.2	4.5	4.4	5.3	5.9	7.0	6.8
North Macedonia	3.7	3.5	3.4	3.1	3.8	4.5	5.4	6.4
Norway	7.0	8.0	8.7	9.3	7.3	8.3	8.0	8.8
Pakistan	5.7	6.1	5.8	5.2	5.5	6.9	7.3	8.0
Palestine	6.3	5.6	4.1	3.6	5.4	7.0	6.4	7.1
Philippines	6.3	5.7	4.3	5.0	5.3	6.0	7.3	8.7
Russia	7.0	5.6	6.1	6.4	5.9	7.7	6.9	7.6
Rwanda	6.9	6.9	7.4	7.9	7.4	7.1	7.6	8.1
Senegal	7.5	4.5	4.2	6.0	5.3	6.2	7.5	8.7
Serbia	5.7	4.2	3.2	4.1	4.0	5.6	5.7	7.1
Sierra Leone	5.8	4.3	6.0	4.5	5.0	5.3	8.5	8.0
Somalia	5.9	6.4	6.4	7.5	6.0	7.6	7.5	7.6
South Africa	4.7	4.9	5.1	5.5	5.4	5.6	7.2	7.1
South Sudan	3.3	3.9	5.3	6.2	6.1	5.3	5.0	6.5
Sudan	5.6	5.8	5.2	5.4	5.6	7.9	8.7	9.6
Tanzania	6.7	6.7	6.3	6.6	6.4	7.2	8.3	8.8
Thailand	7.9	7.5	6.0	6.1	6.3	9.3	9.1	8.8
Turkey	6.5	6.0	5.5	6.6	6.3	7.2	6.6	8.1
Uganda	6.3	5.3	5.6	5.5	6.2	6.6	8.3	8.6
United Kingdom	7.0	6.4	5.6	6.8	6.9	7.5	7.7	7.5
United States	7.4	6.7	6.7	7.1	6.9	7.3	7.3	7.0
Vietnam	5.5	4.4	4.0	4.5	3.9	6.4	7.1	7.5
Yemen	4.2	3.8	3.9	2.7	4.4	6.2	6.4	7.0
Zambia	6.3	6.0	7.0	8.0	7.3	5.8	8.0	8.3
Zimbabwe	7.4	5.8	5.6	4.2	4.8	7.8	9.2	9.4
