= World Values Survey =

Global research project

- Founded: 1981; 45 years ago (registered as the non-profit World Values Survey Association in Stockholm, Sweden)
- Type: Non-profit association
- Locations: Presidency & Secretariat in Vienna, Austria (Institute for Comparative Survey Research); External Relations Office in Stockholm, Sweden (Institute for Future Studies); Archive in Madrid, Spain (JDS Surveys)
- Key people: President: Christian Haerpfer (Austria); Vice President: Alejandro Moreno (Mexico), Christian Welzel (Germany); Secretary General: Bi Puranen (Sweden); Treasurer: Alejandro Moreno (Mexico); Members: Pippa Norris (US), Marta Lagos (Chile), Eduard Ponarin (Russia); Founding President: Ronald Inglehart (US); Archive Director: Jaime Diez-Medrano (Spain)
- Website: www.worldvaluessurvey.org

The World Values Survey (WVS) is a global research project that explores people's values and beliefs, how they change over time, and what social and political impact they have. Since 1981 a worldwide network of social scientists have conducted representative national surveys as part of WVS in almost 100 countries.

The WVS measures, monitors and analyzes: support for democracy, tolerance of foreigners and ethnic minorities, support for gender equality, the role of religion and changing levels of religiosity, the impact of globalization, attitudes toward the environment, work, family, politics, national identity, culture, diversity, insecurity, and subjective well-being.

Romano Prodi, former Prime Minister of Italy and the tenth President of the European Commission, said about WVS work:

The growing globalization of the world makes it increasingly important to understand ... diversity. People with varying beliefs and values can live together and work together productively, but for this to happen it is crucial to understand and appreciate their distinctive worldviews.

== Insights ==
The WVS has over the years demonstrated that people's beliefs play a key role in economic development, the emergence and flourishing of democratic institutions, the rise of gender equality, and the extent to which societies have effective government.

=== Inglehart–Welzel cultural map ===
The 2004 version of the Inglehart–Welzel cultural map. More recent versions can be found on the WVS website:

Analysis of WVS data made by political scientists Ronald Inglehart and Christian Welzel asserts that there are two major dimensions of cross cultural variation in the world:

1. Traditional values versus secular-rational values and
2. Survival values versus self-expression values.

The global cultural map shows how scores of societies are located on these two dimensions. Moving upward on this map reflects the shift from Traditional values to Secular-rational and moving rightward reflects the shift from Survival values to Self-expression values.

Traditional values emphasize the importance of religion, parent-child ties, deference to authority and traditional family values. People who embrace these values also reject divorce, abortion, euthanasia and suicide. These societies have high levels of national pride and a nationalistic outlook.

Secular-rational values have the opposite preferences to the traditional values. These societies place less emphasis on religion, traditional family values and authority. Divorce, abortion, euthanasia and suicide are seen as relatively acceptable.

Survival values place emphasis on economic and physical security. It is linked with a relatively ethnocentric outlook and low levels of trust and tolerance.

Self-expression values give high priority to environmental protection, growing tolerance of foreigners, gays and lesbians and gender equality, and rising demands for participation in decision-making in economic and political life.

Christian Welzel introduced the concepts of emancipative values and secular values. He provided measurements for those values using World Values Survey data. Emancipative values are an updated version of self-expression values. Secular values are an updated version of traditional versus secular rational values. The survival versus self-expression values and the traditional versus secular rational values were factors extracted with an orthogonal technique of factor analysis, which forbids the two scales from correlating with each other. The emancipative and secular values are measured in such a way as to represent the data as faithfully as possible even if this results in a correlation between the scales. The secular and emancipative values indices are positively correlated with each other.

==== Culture variations ====
A somewhat simplified analysis is that following an increase in standards of living, and a transit from development country via industrialization to post-industrial knowledge society, a country tends to move diagonally in the direction from lower-left corner (poor) to upper-right corner (rich), indicating a transit in both dimensions.

However, the attitudes among the population are also highly correlated with the philosophical, political and religious ideas that have been dominating in the country. Secular-rational values and materialism were formulated by philosophers and the left-wing politics side in the French Revolution, and can consequently be observed especially in countries with a long history of social democratic or socialistic policy, and in countries where a large portion of the population have studied philosophy and science at universities. Survival values are characteristic for eastern-world countries and self-expression values for western-world countries. In a liberal post-industrial economy, an increasing share of the population has grown up taking survival and freedom of thought for granted, resulting in that self-expression is highly valued.

==== Examples ====
- Societies that have high scores in Traditional and Survival values: Zimbabwe, Morocco, Jordan, Bangladesh.
- Societies with high scores in Traditional and Self-expression values: Most of Latin America, Ireland.
- Societies with high scores in Secular-rational and Survival values: Russia, Bulgaria, Ukraine, Estonia.
- Societies with high scores in Secular-rational and Self-expression values: Japan, Nordic countries, Benelux, Germany, Switzerland, Czechia, Slovenia, France.

=== Gender values ===
Findings from the WVS indicate that support for gender equality is not just a consequence of democratization. It is part of a broader cultural change that is transforming industrialized societies with mass demands for increasingly democratic institutions. Although a majority of the world's population still believes that men make better political leaders than women, this view is fading in advanced industrialized societies, and also among young people in less prosperous countries.

World Values Survey data is used by the United Nation Development Programme in order to calculate the gender social norms index. The index measures attitudes toward gender equality worldwide and was introduced in the Human Development Report starting from 2019. The index has four components, measuring gender attitudes in politics, education and economy as well as social norms related to domestic violence.

=== Religion ===
The data from the World Values Survey cover several important aspects of people's religious orientation. One of them tracks how involved people are in religious services and how much importance they attach to their religious beliefs. In the data from 2000, 98% of the public in Indonesia said that religion was very important in their lives while in China only three percent considered religion very important. Another aspect concerns people's attitudes towards the relation between religion and politics and whether they approve of religious spokesmen who try to influence government decisions and people's voting preferences.

=== Happiness and life satisfaction ===
The WVS has shown that from 1981 to 2007 happiness rose in 45 of the 52 countries for which long-term data are available. Since 1981, economic development, democratization, and rising social tolerance have increased the extent to which people perceive that they have free choice, which in turn has led to higher levels of happiness around the world, which supports the human development theory.

=== Findings ===
Some of the survey's basic findings are:

1. Much of the variation in human values between societies boils down to two broad dimensions: a first dimension of “traditional vs. secular-rational values” and a second dimension of “survival vs. self-expression values.”
2. On the first dimension, traditional values emphasize religiosity, national pride, respect for authority, obedience and marriage. Secular-rational values emphasize the opposite on each of these accounts.
3. On the second dimension, survival values involve a priority of security over liberty, non-acceptance of homosexuality, abstinence from political action, distrust in outsiders and a weak sense of happiness. Self-expression values imply the opposite on all these accounts.
4. Following the 'revised theory of modernization,' values change in predictable ways with certain aspects of modernity. People's priorities shift from traditional to secular-rational values as their sense of existential security increases (or backwards from secular-rational values to traditional values as their sense of existential security decreases).
5. The largest increase in existential security occurs with the transition from agrarian to industrial societies. Consequently, the largest shift from traditional towards secular-rational values happens in this phase.
6. People's priorities shift from survival to self-expression values as their sense of individual agency increases (or backwards from self-expression values to survival as the sense of individual agency decreases).
7. The largest increase in individual agency occurs with the transition from industrial to knowledge societies. Consequently, the largest shift from survival to self-expression values happens in this phase.
8. The value differences between societies around the world show a pronounced culture zone pattern. The strongest emphasis on traditional values and survival values is found in the Islamic societies of the Middle East. By contrast, the strongest emphasis on secular-rational values and self-expression values is found in the Protestant societies of Northern Europe.
9. These culture zone differences reflect different historical pathways of how entire groups of societies entered modernity. These pathways account for people's different senses of existential security and individual agency, which in turn account for their different emphases on secular-rational values and self-expression values.
10. Values also differ within societies along such cleavage lines as gender, generation, ethnicity, religious denomination, education, income and so forth.
11. Generally speaking, groups whose living conditions provide people with a stronger sense of existential security and individual agency nurture a stronger emphasis on secular-rational values and self-expression values.
12. However, the within-societal differences in people's values are dwarfed by a factor five to ten by the between-societal differences. On a global scale, basic living conditions differ still much more between than within societies, and so do the experiences of existential security and individual agency that shape people's values.
13. A specific subset of self-expression values—emancipative values—combines an emphasis on freedom of choice and equality of opportunities. Emancipative values, thus, involve priorities for lifestyle liberty, gender equality, personal autonomy and the voice of the people.
14. Emancipative values constitute the key cultural component of a broader process of human empowerment. Once set in motion, this process empowers people to exercise freedoms in their course of actions.
15. If set in motion, human empowerment advances on three levels. On the socio-economic level, human empowerment advances as growing action resources increase people's capabilities to exercise freedoms. On the socio-cultural level, human empowerment advances as rising emancipative values increase people's aspirations to exercise freedoms. On the legal-institutional level, human empowerment advances as widened democratic rights increase people's entitlements to exercise freedoms.
16. Human empowerment is an entity of empowering capabilities, aspirations, and entitlements. As an entity, human empowerment tends to advance in virtuous spirals or to recede in vicious spirals on each of its three levels.
17. As the cultural component of human empowerment, emancipative values are highly consequential in manifold ways. For one, emancipative values establish a civic form of modern individualism that favours out-group trust and cosmopolitan orientations towards others.
18. Emancipative values encourage nonviolent protest, even against the risk of repression. Thus, emancipative values provide social capital that activates societies, makes publics more self-expressive, and vitalizes civil society. Emancipative values advance entire societies' civic agency.
19. If emancipative values grow strong in countries that are democratic, they help to prevent movements away from democracy.
20. If emancipative values grow strong in countries that are undemocratic, they help to trigger movements towards democracy.
21. Emancipative values exert these effects because they encourage mass actions that put power holders under pressures to sustain, substantiate or establish democracy, depending on what the current challenge for democracy is.
22. Objective factors that have been found to favour democracy (including economic prosperity, income equality, ethnic homogeneity, world market integration, global media exposure, closeness to democratic neighbours, a Protestant heritage, social capital and so forth) exert an influence on democracy mostly insofar as these factors favour emancipative values.
23. Emancipative values do not strengthen people's desire for democracy, for the desire for democracy is universal at this point in history. But emancipative values do change the nature of the desire for democracy. And they do so in a double way.
24. For one, emancipative values make people's understanding of democracy more liberal: people with stronger emancipative values emphasize the empowering features of democracy rather than bread-and-butter and law-and-order issues.
25. Next, emancipative values make people assess the level of their country's democracy more critically: people with stronger emancipative values rather underrate than overrate their country's democratic performance.
26. Together, then, emancipative values generate a critical-liberal desire for democracy. The critical-liberal desire for democracy is a formidable force of democratic reforms. And, it is the best available predictor of a country's effective level of democracy and of other indicators of good governance. Neither democratic traditions nor cognitive mobilization account for the strong positive impact of emancipative values on the critical-liberal desire for democracy.
27. Emancipative values constitute the single most important factor in advancing the empowerment of women. Economic, religious, and institutional factors that have been found to advance women's empowerment, do so for the most part because they nurture emancipative values.
28. Emancipative values change people's life strategy from an emphasis on securing a decent subsistence level to enhancing human agency. As the shift from subsistence to agency affects entire societies, the overall level of subjective well-being rises.
29. The emancipative consequences of the human empowerment process are not a culture-specific peculiarity of the 'West.' The same empowerment processes that advance emancipative values and a critical-liberal desire for democracy in the 'West,' do the same in the 'East' and in other culture zones.
30. The social dominance of Islam and individual identification as Muslim both weaken emancipative values. But among young Muslims with high education, and especially among young Muslim women with high education, the Muslim/Non-Muslim gap over emancipative values closes.

A 2013 analysis noted the number of people in various countries responding that they would prefer not to have neighbors of the different race ranged from below 5% in many countries to 51.4% in Jordan, with wide variation in Europe.

According to the 2017-2020 world values survey, 95% of Chinese respondents have significant confidence in their government, compared with the world average of 45% government satisfaction.

== History ==
The World Values Surveys were designed to test the hypothesis that economic and technological changes are transforming the basic values and motivations of the publics of industrialized societies. The surveys build on the European Values Study (EVS) first carried out in 1981. The EVS was conducted under the aegis of Jan Kerkhofs and Ruud de Moor and continues to be based in the Netherlands at the Tilburg University. The 1981 study was largely limited to developed societies, but interest in this project spread so widely that surveys were carried out in more than twenty countries, located on all six inhabited continents. Ronald Inglehart of the University of Michigan played a leading role in extending these surveys to be carried out in countries around the world. Today the network includes hundreds of social scientist from more than 100 countries.

The surveys are repeated in waves with intervals of 5 to 10 years. The waves have been carried out in the years listed in this table:

World Values Survey waves
Wave	Survey years
1	1981-1984
2	1990-1994
3	1995-1998
4	1999-2004
5	2005-2009
6	2010-2014
7	2017-2020
8	Planned for 2023–2026

Findings from the first wave of surveys pointed to the conclusion that intergenerational changes were taking place in basic values relating to politics, economic life, religion, gender roles, family norms and sexual norms. The values of younger generations differed consistently from those prevailing among older generations, particularly in societies that had experienced rapid economic growth. To examine whether changes were actually taking place in these values and to analyze the underlying causes, a second wave of WVS surveys was carried out in 1990–91. Because these changes seem to be linked with economic and technological development, it was important to include societies across the entire range of development, from low income societies to rich societies.

A third wave of surveys was carried out in 1995–97, this time in 55 societies and with increased attention being given to analysing the cultural conditions for democracy. A fourth wave of surveys was carried out in 1999–2001 in 65 societies. A key goal was to obtain better coverage of African and Islamic societies, which had been under-represented in previous surveys. A fifth wave was carried out in 2005–07 and a sixth wave was carried out during 2011–12.

Due to the European origin of the project, the early waves of the WVS were eurocentric in emphasis, with little representation in Africa and South-East Asia. To expand, the WVS adopted a decentralised structure, in which social scientists from countries throughout the world participated in the design, execution and analysis of the data, and in publication of findings. In return for providing the data from a survey in their own society, each group obtained immediate access to the data from all participating societies enabling them to analyse social change in a broader perspective.

The WVS network has produced over 300 publications in 20 languages and secondary users have produced several thousand additional publications. The database of the WVS has been published on the internet with free access.

The official archive of the World Values Survey is located in [ASEP/JDS] Madrid, Spain.

== Methodology ==
The World Values Survey uses the sample survey as its mode of data collection, a systematic and standardized approach to collect information through interviewing representative national samples of individuals. The basic stages of a sample survey are Questionnaire design; Sampling; Data collection and Analysis.

=== Questionnaire design ===
For each wave, suggestions for questions are solicited by social scientists from all over the world and a final master questionnaire is developed in English. Since the start in 1981 each successive wave has covered a broader range of societies than the previous one. Analysis of the data from each wave has indicated that certain questions tapped interesting and important concepts while others were of little value. This has led to the more useful questions or themes being replicated in future waves while the less useful ones have been dropped making room for new questions.

The questionnaire is translated into the various national languages and in many cases independently translated back to English to check the accuracy of the translation. In most countries, the translated questionnaire is pre-tested to help identify questions for which the translation is problematic. In some cases certain problematic questions are omitted from the national questionnaire.

=== Sampling ===
Samples are drawn from the entire population of 18 years and older. The minimum sample is 1000. In most countries, no upper age limit is imposed and some form of stratified random sampling is used to obtain representative national samples. In the first stages, a random selection of sampling points is made based on the given society statistical regions, districts, census units, election sections, electoral roll or polling place and central population registers. In most countries the population size and/or degree of urbanization of these Primary Sampling Units are taken into account. In some countries, individuals are drawn from national registers.

=== Data collection and field work ===
Following the sampling, each country is left with a representative national sample of its public. These persons are then interviewed during a limited time frame decided by the executive committee of the World Values Survey using the uniformly structured questionnaires. The survey is carried out by professional organizations using face-to-face interviews or phone interviews for remote areas. Each country has a Principal Investigator (social scientists working in academic institutions) who is responsible for conducting the survey in accordance with the fixed rules and procedures. During the field work, the agency has to report in writing according to a specific check-list. Internal consistency checks are made between the sampling design and the outcome and rigorous data cleaning procedures are followed at the WVS data archive. No country is included in a wave before full documentation has been delivered. This means a data set with the completed methodological questionnaire. and a report of country-specific information (for example important political events during the fieldwork, problems particular to the country). Once all the surveys are completed, the Principal Investigator has access to all surveys and data.

=== Analysis ===
The World Values Survey group works with leading social scientists, recruited from each society studied. They represent a wide range of cultures and perspectives which makes it possible to draw on the insights of well-informed insiders in interpreting the findings. It also helps disseminate social science techniques to new countries.

Each research team that has contributed to the survey analyses the findings according to its hypotheses. Because all researchers obtain data from all of the participating societies, they are also able to compare the values and beliefs of the people of their own society with those from scores of other societies and to test alternative hypotheses. In addition, the participants are invited to international meetings at which they can compare findings and interpretations with other members of the WVS network. The findings are then disseminated through international conferences and joint publications.

=== Usage ===
The World Values Survey data has been downloaded by over 100,000 researchers, journalists, policy-makers and others. The data is available on the WVS website which contains tools developed for online analysis.

== Governance and funding ==
The World Values Survey is organised as a network of social scientists coordinated by a central body - the World Values Survey Association. It is established as a non-profit organization seated in Stockholm, Sweden, with a constitution and mission statement. The project is guided by an executive committee representing all regions of the world. The committee is also supported by a Scientific Advisory Committee, a Secretariat and an Archive. The WVS Executive Committee provides leadership and strategic planning for the association. It is responsible for the recruitment of new members, the organization of meetings and workshops, data processing and distribution, capacity building and the promotion of publications and dissemination of results. The WVS Executive Committee also raises funds for central functions and assists member groups in their fundraising.

Each national team is responsible for its own expenses and most surveys are financed by local sources. However, central funding has been obtained in cases where local funding is not possible. Presently, the activities of the WVS Secretariat and WVS Executive Committee are funded by the Bank of Sweden Tercentenary Foundation. Other funding has been obtained from the U.S. National Science Foundation, the Swedish International Development Cooperation Agency (SIDA), the Volkswagen Foundation, the German Science Foundation (DFG) and the Dutch Ministry of Education, Culture and Science.

== Media coverage ==
The World Values Survey data has been used in a large number of scholarly publications and the findings have been reported in media such as BBC News, Bloomberg Businessweek, China Daily, Chinadialogue.net, CNN, Der Spiegel, Der Standard, Rzeczpospolita, Gazeta Wyborcza, Le Monde, Neue Zürcher Zeitung, Newsweek, Süddeutsche Zeitung, Time, The Economist, The Guardian, The New Yorker, The New York Times, The Sydney Morning Herald, The Washington Post, and the World Development Report.

== World Values Paper Series: World Values Research ==
World Values Research (WVR), registered as ISSN 2000-2777, is the official online paper series of the World Values Survey Association. The series is edited by the executive committee of the Association. WVR publishes research papers of high scientific standards based on evidence from World Values Surveys data. Papers in WVR follow good academic practice and abide to ethical norms in line with the mission of the World Values Survey Association. Publication of submitted papers is pending on an internal review by the executive committee of the World Values Survey Association. WVR papers present original research based on data from the World Values Surveys, providing new evidence and novel insights of theoretical relevance to the theme of human values. An archive of published WVR papers is available on the project's website.

== See also ==
- Afrobarometer
- Eurobarometer
- Global value chain
- Latin American Public Opinion Project
- Broad measures of economic progress
- Happiness economics
- Post-materialism
- World Social Capital Monitor

== Bibliography ==
- Alesina, A; Giuliano, P; Nunn, N (2010), The Origins of Gender roles — Women and the Plough (PDF), World Values Survey.
- Alexander, A; Welzel, C (2010), "Empowering Women: The Role of Emancipative Values", European Sociological Review, 27 (3).
- Alexander, A; Welzel, C (2011), "Islam and Patriarchy: How Robust is Muslim Support for Patriarchal Values?" (PDF), World Values Research, 4 (2), archived from the original (PDF) on 2013-12-24.
- Esmer, Y (2004), Inglehart, Ronald; Basanez, Miguel; Diez-Medrano, Jaime; Halman, Loek; Luijkx, Ruud (eds.), Human Beliefs and Values: A cross-cultural sourcebook based on the 1999–2002 values surveys.
- Inglehart, Ronald; Basanez, Miguel; Diez-Medrano, Jaime; Halman, Loek; Luijkx, Ruud, eds. (2004), Human Beliefs and Values: A cross-cultural sourcebook based on the 1999–2002 values surveys.
- Inglehart, Ronald; Welzel, C (2005), Modernization, Cultural Change and Democracy, New York and Cambridge: Cambridge University Press.
- Inglehart, Ronald; Welzel, C (2010), Changing Mass Priorities: The Link between Modernization and Democracy (PDF), World Values Survey.
- Welzel, C (2007), "Are Levels of Democracy Affected by Mass Attitudes?" (PDF), International Political Science Review, 28 (4): 397–424, doi:10.1177/0192512107079640, S2CID 145283037.
- Welzel, C (March 2010), "How Selfish Are Self-Expression Values: A Civicness Test", Journal of Cross-Cultural Psychology, 41 (2): 152–174, doi:10.1177/0022022109354378, S2CID 145719034.
- Welzel, C (2011), "The Asian Values Thesis Revisited: Evidence from the World Values Surveys", Japanese Journal of Political Science, 12 (1): 1–31, doi:10.1017/S1468109910000277, S2CID 145126223.
- Welzel, C; Inglehart, Ronald (2008), "Democratization as Human Empowerment", Journal of Democracy, 19 (1).
- Welzel, C; Inglehart, Ronald (2010), "Values, Agency, and Well-Being: A Human Development Model", Social Indicators Research, 97 (1): 43–63, doi:10.1007/s11205-009-9557-z, PMC 2848347, PMID 20390031.
- Welzel, C; Inglehart, Ronald; Deutsch, F (2005), "Social Capital, Voluntary Associations, and Collective Action: Which Aspects of Social Capital Have the Greatest 'Civic' Payoff?", Journal of Civil Society, 1 (2): 121–146, doi:10.1080/17448680500337475, S2CID 144604927.
- Welzel, C; Inglehart, Ronald; Klingemann, HD (2003), "The Theory of Human Development: A Cross-Cultural Analysis" (PDF), European Journal of Political Research, 42 (3), DE: Jacobs University: 341–79, doi:10.1111/1475-6765.00086, hdl:2027.42/74505.
