= Eurobarometer =

Series of surveys conducted on behalf of the EU

- Public opinion survey
- Project type: Public opinion survey
- Funding agency: European Commission
- Objective: To measure public opinion across EU member states
- Participants: Europeans
- Duration: 1973 – present
- Website: europa.eu/eurobarometer

Eurobarometer is a series of public opinion surveys conducted regularly on behalf of the European Commission and other EU institutions since 1974. These surveys address a wide variety of topical issues relating to the European Union throughout its member states.

The Eurobarometer results are published by the European Commission's Directorate-General Communication. Its database since 1974 is one of the largest in the world.

== History ==
In 1970 and 1971, the European Commission conducted surveys in the six member countries (at that time) of the European Community—Belgium, France, West Germany, Italy, Luxembourg, and the Netherlands. These surveys assessed public opinion on individual national priorities as well as integrated European functions and organisations, including the Common Market.

Regular semi-annual polls of member nations – now also including Denmark, Ireland and the United Kingdom – began in September 1973, with the survey series first being given the name Eurobarometer in 1974. The fieldwork for Euro-Barometer 1 was conducted in April–May of that year, with results published in July.

A first international survey on attitudes towards European unification was carried out in 1962 at the request of the Press and Information Service of the European Communities in Belgium, France, West Germany, Italy, Luxembourg, and the Netherlands.

== Surveys ==
- Standard Eurobarometer: Regular public opinion surveys conducted by the European Commission since 1974, assessing EU citizens' views on various topics.
- Flash Eurobarometer: Ad-hoc thematic surveys carried out within a short timespan on specific topics relevant to EU policies.
- Central and Eastern Eurobarometer: Annual surveys conducted between 1990 and 1997 in up to 20 Central and Eastern European countries, monitoring economic and political changes.
- Candidate Countries Eurobarometer: Surveys launched in 2001 for EU applicant states, later merged into the Standard series. As of 2024, includes data from Albania, Bosnia and Herzegovina, North Macedonia, Moldova, Montenegro, Serbia, Turkey, the Turkish Cypriot Community, and the United Kingdom.

== Controversies ==
In August 2025, Dutch research uncovered widespread sampling errors by Verian, the polling firm that conducts Eurobarometer surveys in the Netherlands. It found that in the samples in the Netherlands, Sweden, and Finland, people with a progressive left political preference and a higher level of education are overrepresented. Both these traits are correlated with pro-EU preferences.

== Latest Results (Spring 2025) ==
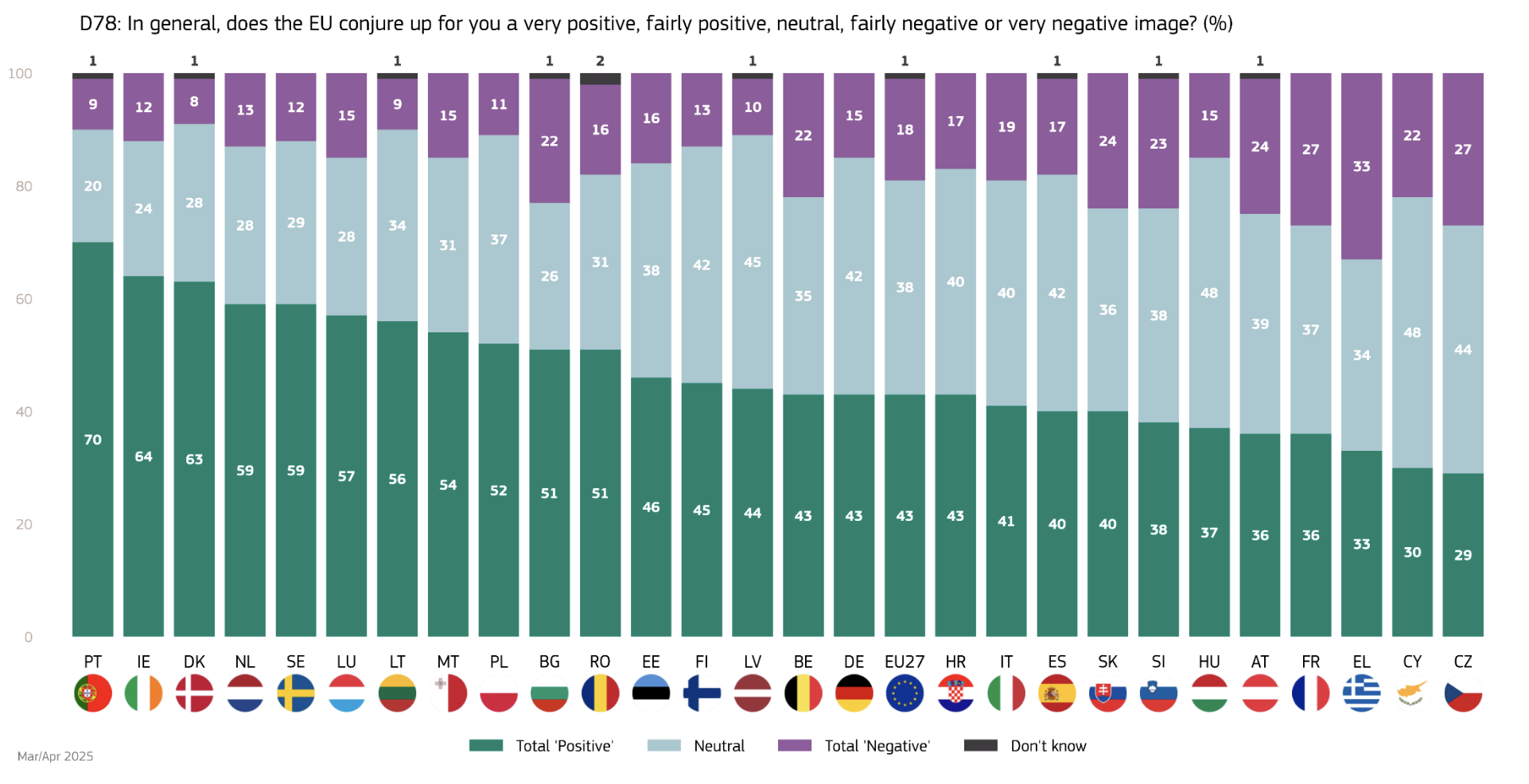
In general, does the European Union conjure up positive, neutral or negative feelings? (Spring 2025)

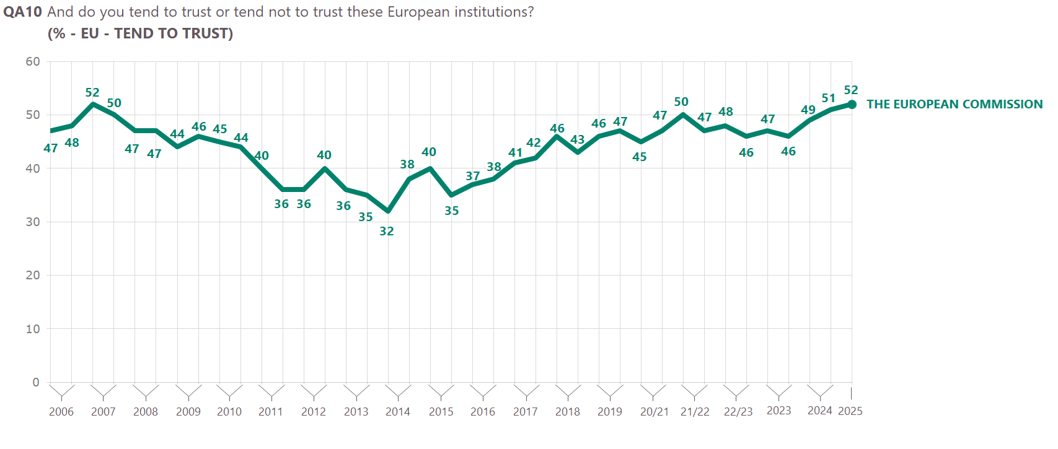
Do you tend to trust the European Commission? (Spring 2025)

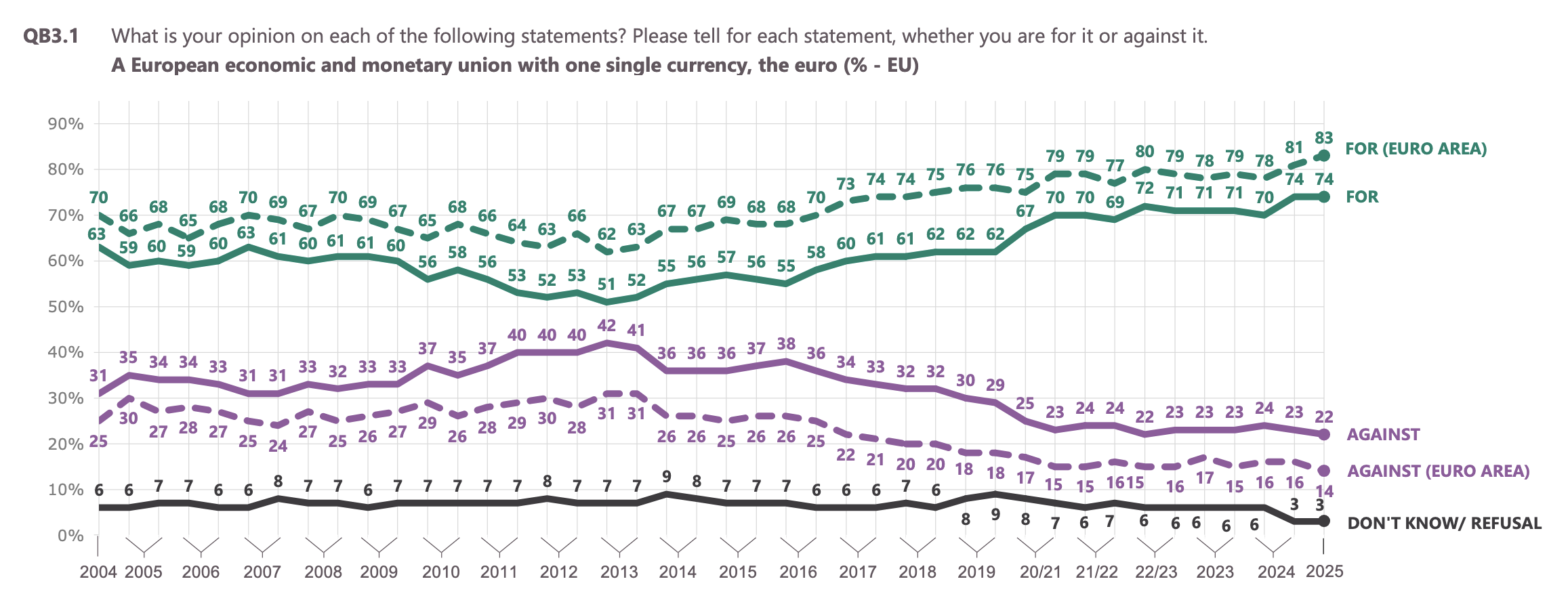
Are you for or against the Euro? (Spring 2025)

== See also ==
- Afrobarometer
- European Social Survey
- LAPOP Latin American Public Opinion Project
- Arab Barometer
- World Values Survey
