= Christian Welzel =

German political scientist

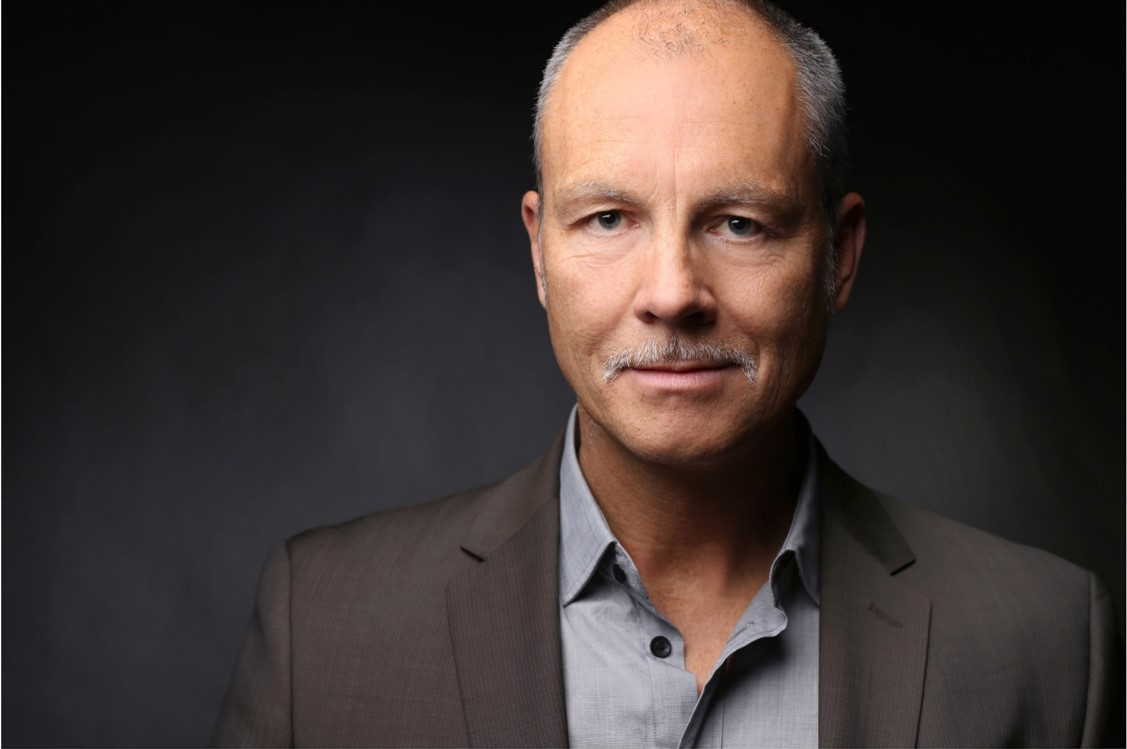
Welzel

Christian Welzel (born 1964) is a German political scientist at the Leuphana University Lueneburg and director of research at the World Values Survey Association. He is known for the model of cultural dimensions which measures emancipative values and secular values.

== University education and career ==
Welzel obtained his Magister Artium (M.A.) degree in political science and economic history at the Saarland University in 1991 and continued with a doctorate at the University of Potsdam. For his monograph Democratic Elite Change: The Renewal of East German Elites from the Perspective of Democratic Sociology he was awarded a PhD with distinction in 1996. He worked as a senior research fellow in the department of “Institutions and Social Change” of the Social Science Research Center Berlin and qualified as professor at the Free University of Berlin.

Following the publication of Vantage Point ‘Human Development’: On the Roots of Democracy and the Causes of its Diffusion he became associate professor and started working as visiting professor at the University of Potsdam in 2000. In 2002, he moved to Bremen University as associate professor of political science. In 2006 Welzel was promoted to full professor. Having spent eight years in Bremen, he took a new job as professor of political culture research at the Institute of Political Science and Center for the Study of Democracy at the Leuphana University in 2010. In the same year, he became research professor at the Higher School of Economics (HSE) in Saint Petersburg, Russia. Welzel also spends much time in the United States, where he maintains close ties with researchers and professors from the Center for the Study of Democracy at the University of California, Irvine.

In 2015 he became a member of the German Academy of Sciences Leopoldina.

== Areas of academic interest ==
- Modernization, social change, and human development
- Democratization, quality of democracy and governance quality
- Value formation, cultural change, Generational Replacement and public opinion
- Protest participation and social movements
- Civil society and social capital

== Value orientation, value change and World Values Survey ==
Since Welzel joined the Center for the Study of Democracy at the Leuphana University in Lueneburg, work on the World Values Survey project has been an important part of the center’s research activities. Welzel is responsible for the German part of the survey, which involves 2000 face-to-face interviews. In recent years, Welzel has focused largely on the effect that emancipative values have on the emergence and stability of democratic regimes and developed a well-reasoned theory of emancipation. In his latest book Freedom Rising he presents an all-embracing theory of “why human freedom gave way to increasing oppression since the invention of states - and why this trend began to reverse itself more recently, leading to a rapid expansion of universal freedoms and democracy.”

== Bibliography ==
Monographs

- Welzel, Christian (2013), Freedom Rising: Human Empowerment and the Quest for Emancipation, New York: Cambridge University Press, ISBN 9781107034709.
- Inglehart, Ronald & Welzel, Christian (2005), Modernization, Cultural Change and Democracy: The Human Development Sequence, New York: Cambridge University Press, ISBN 9780521846950.
- Welzel, Christian (2002), Fluchtpunkt Humanentwicklung: Über die Grundlagen der Demokratie und die Ursachen ihrer Ausbreitung [Vantage Point 'Human Development': On the Roots of Democracy and the Causes of its Diffusion], Opladen: Westdeutscher Verlag, ISBN 3531136089.
- Welzel, Christian (1997), Demokratischer Elitenwandel: Die Erneuerung der ostdeutschen Elite aus demokratie-soziologischer Sicht [Democratic Elite Change: The Renewal of East German Elites from the Perspective of Democratic Sociology], Opladen: Leske und Budrich, doi:10.1007/978-3-663-09587-3, ISBN 9783663095880.

Edited Volumes

- Dalton, Russel J. & Welzel, Christian (2014), The Civic Culture Transformed. From Allegiant to Assertive Citizens, Cambridge: Cambridge University Press, ISBN 9781107039261.
- Haerpfer, Christian; Bernhagen, Patrick; Inglehart, Ronald & Welzel, Christian (2009), Democratization, Oxford: Oxford University Press, ISBN 9780199233021.
- Lauth, Hans-Joachim; Pickel, Gert & Welzel, Christian (2000), Demokratiemessung: Konzepte und Befunde im internationalen Vergleich [Measuring Democracy: Concepts and Findings], Opladen: Westdeutscher Verlag, doi:10.1007/978-3-322-89590-5, ISBN 9783531134383.

Scientific articles

- Alexander, Amy C.; Inglehart, Ronald; Welzel, Christian (2012), "Measuring Effective Democracy: A Defense", International Political Science Review, 33 (1): 41–62, doi:10.1177/0192512111414682, S2CID 33166963.
- Welzel, Christian; Deutsch, Franziska (2011), "Emancipative Values and Nonviolent Protest: The Importance of 'Ecological' Effects", British Journal of Political Science, 42 (2): 465–479, doi:10.1017/S0007123411000421, S2CID 144037755.
- Alexander, Amy C.; Welzel, Christian (2011), "Measuring Effective Democracy: The Human Empowerment Approach", Comparative Politics, 43 (3): 271–289, doi:10.5129/001041511795274931.
- Alexander, Amy C.; Welzel, Christian (2011), "Islam and Patriarchy: How Robust is Muslim Support for Patriarchal Values?", International Review of Sociology, 21 (2): 249–275, doi:10.1080/03906701.2011.581801, S2CID 143256320.
- Welzel, Christian; Inglehart, Ronald (2010), "Values, Agency, and Well-Being: A Human Development Model", Social Indicators Research, 97 (1): 43–63, doi:10.1007/s11205-009-9557-z, PMC 2848347, PMID 20390031.
- Welzel, Christian (2010), "How Selfish are Self-Expression Values? A Civicness Test", Journal of Cross-Cultural Psychology, 41 (2): 152–174, doi:10.1177/0022022109354378, S2CID 145719034.
- Inglehart, Ronald; Welzel, Christian (2010), "Changing Mass Priorities: The Link between Modernization and Democracy", Perspectives on Politics, 8 (2): 551–567, doi:10.1017/S1537592710001258, S2CID 49528865.
- Brockmann, Hilke; Delhey, Jan; Welzel, Christian; Yuan, Hao (2009), "The China Puzzle: Falling Happiness in a Rising Economy", Journal of Happiness Studies, 10 (4): 387–405, doi:10.1007/s10902-008-9095-4, S2CID 145133831.
- Inglehart, Ronald; Foa, Roberto; Peterson, Christopher; Welzel, Christian (2008), "Development, Freedom and Rising Happiness: A Global Perspective 1981-2006", Perspectives on Psychological Science, 3 (4): 264–285, doi:10.1111/j.1745-6924.2008.00078.x, PMID 26158947, S2CID 10046821.
- Welzel, Christian; Inglehart, Ronald (2008), "Democratization as Human Empowerment", Journal of Democracy, 19 (1): 126–140, doi:10.1353/jod.2008.0009, S2CID 55940307.
- Welzel, Christian (2006), "Democratization as an Emancipative Process", European Journal of Political Research, 45 (6): 871–896, doi:10.1111/j.1475-6765.2006.00637.x.
- Welzel, Christian; Inglehart, Ronald; Deutsch, Franziska (2005), "Social Capital, Voluntary Associations, and Collective Action: Which Aspects of Social Capital Have the Greatest 'Civic' Payoff?", Journal of Civil Society, 1 (2): 121–146, doi:10.1080/17448680500337475, S2CID 144604927.
- Inglehart, Ronald; Welzel, Christian (2003), "Political Culture and Democracy: Analyzing Cross level Linkages", Comparative Politics, 36 (1): 61–79, doi:10.2307/4150160, JSTOR 4150160.
- Inglehart, Ronald; Klingemann, Hans-Dieter; Welzel, Christian (2003), "The Theory of Human Development: A Cross-Cultural Analysis" (PDF), European Journal of Political Research, 42 (3): 341–380, doi:10.1111/1475-6765.00086, hdl:2027.42/74505.
- Inglehart, Ronald; Norris, Pippa; Welzel, Christian (2002), "Gender Equality and Democracy", Comparative Sociology, 1 (3–4): 235–264, doi:10.1163/156913302100418592.
