= Benjamin Cornwell =

American sociologist

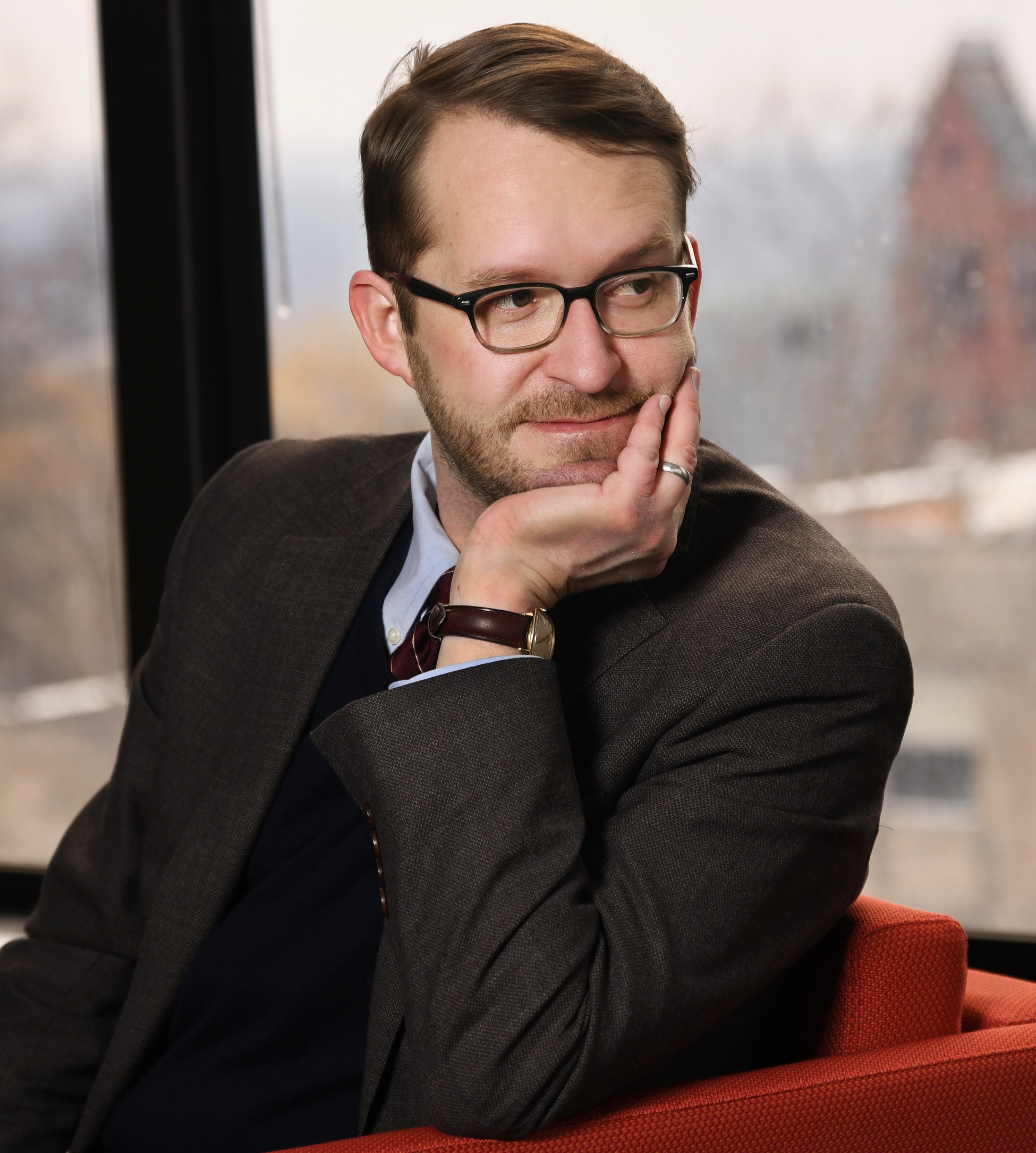
- Benjamin Cornwell (Ithaca, New York, 2023)
- Born: April 30, 1978 (age 48); Huntington, West Virginia
- Education: University of Chicago
- Known for: Contributions to social network analysis, Social epidemiology, sequence analysis
- Spouse: Erin York Cornwell
- Scientific career
- Fields: Sociology, Social epidemiology
- Workplaces: Cornell University
- Doctoral advisor: Edward Laumann
- Other academic advisors: Linda Waite, Jason Beckfield

Benjamin Thomas Cornwell (born April 30, 1978) is an American sociologist. He is Professor of Sociology at Cornell University, where he served as chair from 2020 to 2024. He earned his Ph.D. at the University of Chicago in 2007. He studied under Edward Laumann, Linda Waite, and Jason Beckfield. He works on issues surrounding sociological methods, the epidemic spread of infectious disease, health and aging, and collective behavior.

== Early life and family ==
Benjamin Cornwell was born to Thomas and Susan (Smith) Cornwell in 1978 in Huntington, West Virginia. He is a distant relation of Oliver Cromwell, who led England as Lord Protector between the reigns of Kings Charles I and Charles II. Through his maternal great-grandmother, Edna Alice (Hatfield) Smith, he is a cousin of Devil Anse Hatfield and Henry D. Hatfield. Through this family, he is a distant relative of JD Vance who, according to Vance's memoir, is related to the Hafields. His paternal 4th great-grandfather is Thomas Hannan, a revolutionary war soldier and the first Anglo settler of the Kanawha River region of Virginia (now West Virginia). His father was a social worker at Middletown Regional Hospital, and his mother a medical secretary at Children's in Cincinnati. His cousin, Kathie Stewart, is a founding member of the Cleveland Baroque Orchestra (principal flutist). He and his wife, Erin York Cornwell, have one daughter, Marlowe.

== Scholarly career ==
Cornwell earned his B.A. in sociology in 2000 at the University of Cincinnati, his M.A. at The Ohio State University in 2001, and his Ph.D. at Chicago. His dissertation was titled Physical Function and Social Action, which argues that individuals' structural positions within larger social networks is partly a function of health. After receiving his PhD, he spent a year as a postdoctoral fellow at the Chicago Center for the Demography of Economics and Aging. During his time at Chicago, he was a research assistant and researcher for the National Social Life, Health, and Aging Project, on which he eventually became a co-investigator. He has since served as consulting editor of American Journal of Sociology, which was founded in 1895 and is the oldest journal of sociology in history.

He served for several years as a teaching intern and research assistant for ex-Chicago dean Donald N. Levine while at Chicago, helping him in his argument for the need for a revamped and renewed undergraduate curriculum centering not on memorization of facts or testing, but on analytic understanding, the ancient art of rhetoric, and a focus on the mutual constitution of the mind's powers and its connection to the body. He was hired as an assistant professor in the Department of Sociology at Cornell in 2008, and was appointed as Chair of that Department in 2020, during the height of the COVID-19 pandemic.

Cornwell is author or editor on three books and over 70 scientific articles. Many of his research articles have been on the study of the role social networks play in affecting people's - especially socially disadvantaged and physically or cognitively vulnerable individuals' - social networks, access to support an exchange opportunities, and "social capital," which are critical for well being. In general, because in part of their social capital benefits and because they embed people in exchange and support networks that provide resources and companionship, people who experience disruptions like network member mortality or infectious disease, attempt to remain connected, often using the community as a substitute when necessary. This is critical not only for individual- and population-level health, but also for control and independence in daily life. He has shown that due to the sometimes rapid onset of health problems and losses, people prioritize and struggle to maintain a kind of homeostasis in their personal and community social networks, including maintaining and recovering a stable network. He has used national survey data extensively to uncover circumstances under which people have smaller social networks, less stable networks, and less social capital (e.g., due to repeated personal losses). People are usually able to replace lost network ties with new ones, except when social disadvantage comes into play.

The other influential line of his research has to do with developing advanced sociological research methods, particularly in the areas of social network analysis and sequence analysis. In Social Sequence Analysis, he shows how the use of sequence methods that are usually employed in biology to study DNA and bioinformatics can be applied to understanding sequences of events and experiences in individuals’ lives (ranging from chains of everyday social activities to career and life-course trajectories). Demographers have been using sequence methods heavily to study trajectories of homelessness, housing security, and home ownership, inter-generational transfers of wealth and property, and unemployment and labor market trajectories and poverty. This extends to research on the inter-regional transient geographic movements of refugees over time and space. One of the areas in which this social sequence approach has had the greatest impact is on the study of the structure of time use, everyday activity structure, in terms of timing and ordering of repeated actions and routines, and work schedule patterns. In economic sociology, research has used these methods to characterize patterns of firm performance. This approach has also led to unforeseen implications for topics outside of the social sciences, including research on crash tests of automated vehicles, efficiency in software engineering research, based on execution traces, the study in complexity in business process management, and machine learning as a general research tool in science. It has also shaped conservationists' efforts to understand spatial use patterns in the river-lake habitats of sturgeon (endangered bottom-feeding fish) over several years' time,

He has also developed new methods for studying social networks, including novel approaches to measure features of two-mode networks, which involve ties not just between people, but between people and organizations and the massive invisible web-like structures these connections create. One of his most important papers on network analysis methods along these lines, co-authored with Kim Weeden, used data on the networks of students on college campuses to demonstrate that the risk of the epidemic spread of SARS-CoV-2 could be curbed by shutting down particularly large classes and moving them online. Their research led colleges and universities around the world to shut down large classes or campuses completely during the height of the pandemic. Cornwell conducted the actual network analysis that revealed the small-world network nature of college campuses, which supported their controversial suggestion of a turn toward a hybrid model of class instruction, at least in the short run. Based on these findings, Weeden and Cornwell worked with academic institutions at the University and preparatory level to help develop hybrid plans for instruction during the pandemic. Since then, scholars have been using sequence methods, network methods, and in-class observations to study the feasibility of hybrid teaching models. This particular line of work has been useful in determining the feasibility of continued use of hybrid education models to lighten the volume of physical co-presence in classroom settings without sacrificing educational quality. Cornwell's research on 2-mode network analysis has also had a noteworthy influence in its broad applications to different topics, such as complex course enrollment structures and topics such as elite coordination in urban settings, firm performance, the development of measurement techniques to discover policy-relevant activity, trip, and tour patterns, especially among families, and the emergence of transshipment hubs and hybrid ports that create valuable but largely invisible bridges in the global container shipping network. Similar work in civil engineering has used 2-mode network analysis to detect the existence of 2-mode bridges in key bus stations, as identified through passenger flow patterns. His network research on the Beverly Hills Supper Club fire has shown how people's risk of dying in emergency evacuations is associated with how they are tied to the other people who are present when the disaster occurs. Those who are present with a larger group, and/or with closer contacts whom they are less willing to abandon, are more likely to die. This work emphasizes that the popular concept of "panic" rarely shapes behavior in emergencies, and that people instead tend to work rationally to maintain preexisting social roles and connections during these situations.

He won Cornell University’s fellowship competition from the Institute for the Social Sciences. In 2017, the American Sociological Association's section on methodology awarded Cornwell the Leo Goodman award for distinctive contributions to sociological methodology, in recognition of his work in social network analysis and sequence analysis. He is an inaugural member of the international Sequence Analysis Association's advisory board. He has applied sequence analysis to the study of individuals' time-use patterns, which have revealed important gender differences in time allocation, among other topics, with collaborators Jonathan Gershuny (CBE) and Oriel Sullivan.

== Selected scholarly works ==
- Carr, Deborah, Shelley Correll, Robert Crosnoe, Jeremy Freese, Mary C. Waters, Benjamin Cornwell, and Elizabeth Boyle. 2017. The Art and Science of Social Research. New York: W.W. Norton & Company.
- Cornwell, Benjamin. 2015. Social Sequence Analysis. New York: Cambridge.
- Cornwell, Benjamin, Cristobal Young, Barum Park, and Nan Feng. 2026. Friends and Fortunes: Social Networks, Prosperity, and Power. New York: Cambridge (forthcoming).
- Cornwell, Benjamin, Jonathan Gershuny, and Oriel Sullivan. 2019. “The Social Structure of Time: Emerging Trends and New Directions.” Annual Review of Sociology 45:301-320
- Cornwell, Benjamin, and Jing-Mao Ho. 2022. "Network Structure in Small Groups and Survival in Disasters." Social Forces 100:1357-1384.
- Cornwell, Benjamin, Edward Laumann, and L. Philip Schumm. 2008. “The Social Connectedness of Older Adults: A National Profile.” American Sociological Review 73:185-203.
