= Ritschard =

Ritschard is a surname. According to forebears.io and familysearch.org, this surname is most commonly found in Switzerland and the United States. In Switzerland, it is most found in the cantons of Bern, the Zürich, and Aargau; in the United States, it is most commonly found in the states of Wisconsin, Colorado, and Pennsylvania.

Notable people with the surname include:

- Alexander Ritschard (born 1994), a Swiss-American tennis player
- Gilbert Ritschard (born 1950), a Swiss statistician at the University of Geneva
- Willi Ritschard (1918–1983), a Swiss politician
