= Andrew Abbott (sociologist) =

American sociologist (born 1948)

- Born: November, 1948
- Education: Harvard University, University of Chicago
- Known for: Contributions to sociological theory, sociology of knowledge, sequence analysis
- Scientific career
- Fields: Sociology
- Institutions: Rutgers University, University of Chicago
- Doctoral advisor: Morris Janowitz
- Other academic advisors: Edward Shils, Joseph Ben-David, Jarl Dyrud, Donald N. Levine
- Website: https://sociology.uchicago.edu/directory/andrew-abbott

Andrew Delano Abbott (born November 1948) is an American sociologist and social theorist working at the University of Chicago. He is the Gustavus F. and Ann M. Swift Distinguished Service Professor in the Department of Sociology and the college. His research topics range from occupations and professions to the philosophy of methods, the history of academic disciplines, to the sociology of knowledge. He is also the founder of the field of sequence analysis. He was the editor of the American Journal of Sociology from 2000 to 2016.

== Education and career ==
Abbott attended Phillips Academy at Andover, and majored in history and literature at Harvard University. During the studying (1967–1971) he also worked as research assistant for Roger Revelle at Harvard University Center for Population Studies.

From 1971 to 1982, he was a graduate student in the Department of Sociology of the University of Chicago. He defended his dissertation in 1982, written under the supervision of Morris Janowitz. The dissertation, never published, was a study of the emergence of psychiatry as a profession.

During 1973-1978 worked at Research and Evaluation Department, Manteno State Hospital.

From 1978 to 1991, he was on the faculty at Rutgers University and became an instructor to associate professor in 1986. He then returned to the University of Chicago, worked as a professor of the Department of Sociology and the college from 1991 to 1997, then became Ralph Lewis Professor in 1997, continuing up to 2000.

Abbott was master of the Social Science Division (1993–1996) and chair of the Department of Sociology (1999–2002). Until recently, he was also the chair of the university's library board, where he spearheaded the development of the Joe and Rika Mansueto Library, a ground-breaking structure aimed at making the ever-growing amount of print material more easily accessible to researchers.

Abbott edited Work and Occupations from 1991 to 1994. Subsequently, he was the editor of one of the two leading journals in U.S. Sociology, the American Journal of Sociology, from 2000 to 2016.

Abbott became the Gustavus F. and Ann M. Swift Distinguished Service Professor in Sociology in 2001.

== Prizes and awards ==
Abbott has received many awards for his work and service, amongst which are several American Sociological Association prizes. He is a member of the American Academy of Arts and Sciences and received a Doctor Honoris Causa from the University of Versailles - Saint Quentin (2011, France). He was also affiliated with University of Surrey at the Norman Chester Research (1990), and is still a fellow at Nuffield College at Oxford (since 1997). Abbott was given several grants, such as NSF Anthropology Grant for "Optimal Matching with Cultural Data" as consultant (P.I. - John Forrest). NSF SES Grant for publication "Dynamic Sequencing Methods for Studying Turning Points in Criminal Careers" (CoPI - Robert J. Sampson), NSF Doctoral Dissertation Research Grants as PI.

In 2011 Abbott was given the Médaille de la ville de Grenoble. He received the Quantrell Award in 2017.

== Research areas ==
Professions

Abbott is known for his study of professions and status. His 1988 book, The System of Professions, is considered an important contribution to sociology. The book was awarded the American Sociological Association's Distinguish Scholarly book award in 1991. In The System of Professions Andrew Abbott explores central questions about the role of professions in modern life: through comparative and historical study of the professions in nineteenth- and twentieth-century England, France, and America, Abbott builds a general theory of how and why professionals evolve. Reviews of the book mention several "powerful ideas" that enhance previous work on professionals:

1. ‘The appropriate perspective on the development and change of professions is ecological’.
2. ‘To understand professions, one must study jurisdictions, areas of work over which occupational groups have vied’.
3. ‘Professions constitute a system’.
4. ‘Professional struggle occurs at three levels: the workplace, culture and public opinion, and legal and administrative rules’.
5. ‘The most consequential struggles are waged on grounds of competence and theory. Successful professions maintain a ‘strategic heartland monopoly’ over a core jurisdiction’.

The arguments are illustrated by three historical case studies. First named ‘a fascinating account of struggles by librarians, computer programmers, operations researchers, and others over the “information” jurisdiction’ is reported to be an example of juxtaposition of professional histories being usually considered separately. The second case study (a comparative study of lawyers in the United States and England) ‘uses court cases on incursions by other professionals to track the nature of professional conflict’. The third one analyzes ‘the evolution of the personal-problems jurisdiction’ making an accent on the decline of the clergy and the rise of psychiatry.

The arguments have been critiqued as being subjective by a reviewer who said the model of ‘diagnosis, inference, and treatment’ is considered to be ‘only partially successful'. Secondly, Andrew Abbott’s insights ‘build on and complement … professionalization models rather than supplant them’.

Another point of critique mentioned is a way comparison of the volume's ecological view with the population-ecology's perspective is done: ‘First, the demography of professions plays a key role in the case studies… Second, Abbott’s call to focus on jurisdictions rather than occupations should be taken seriously by population ecologists, who ordinarily focus on organizations rather than niches. Third, the fates of many organizations and the professions that stuff them are intertwined; interdependence between the two ecologies deserves close empirical scrutiny’.

Methods and epistemology

Another aspect of Abbott's work deals with methods and their relation to (social scientific) knowledge. Abbott imported into social science computational techniques for analyzing sequence data—in particular optimal matching analysis, a technique that detects similarities between numerous sequences, hence enabling a quantitative approach to careers and other social sequence data. His book Time Matters, published in 2001, is a collection of essays on the philosophy of methods that summarizes and furthers Abbott's main arguments on time and processes. The development of this set of methods has heavily influenced the development of the field of social sequence analysis. He provided the range of publications and has made 'arguments about the role of an event-focused “narrative' approach to sociology'. A “first wave” of applications can be attributed directly to his influence, which are summarized in a debate in the journal Sociological Methods and Research in 2000.

Academic disciplines and knowledge production

Abbott analyzed academic disciplines in two books, Department and Discipline (1999) and Chaos of Discipline (2001). The first book analyzes the history of sociology at Chicago and in particular the history of the American Journal of Sociology. The second provides a systematic approach to the intellectual development of disciplines. With the reconsideration of 'how knowledge changes and advances' he challenges the idea of social sciences being in 'a perpetual state of progress' stating them cycling around 'an inevitable pattern of core principles'.

Abbott has written also about knowledge production in Methods of Discovery (2004 - a handbook for social science heuristics) and Digital Paper (2014 – a handbook for research with data found in libraries or on the internet). He analyzes the various ways of knowing and its relation to materials. The ways of acquiring knowledge and the foundation of knowledge is reflected in the both books: from heuristics analysis to the organisation of the research: The library research in the Digital Paper is broken down 'into seven basic and simultaneous tasks: design, search, scanning/browsing, reading, analyzing, filing, and writing'.

Processualism

Throughout Abbott's work runs the idea of a processual approach to the social world. This perspective, which is meant to offer an alternative paradigm to investigate society, is sketched out in a recent collection of essays

== Reviews as Barbara Celarent ==
For many years each issue of the American Journal of Sociology featured an essay reviewing an historically important sociology book, written under the pen name of Barbara Celarent, supposedly writing from the year 2049. The provided standard of sociological reviewer-ship is considered to be new because of executing the study of the works 'with a rare depth and seriousness'.

== Bibliography ==
- The emergence of American psychiatry, 1880-1930, 1982.
- The system of professions : an essay on the division of expert labor. Chicago: University of Chicago Press, 1988 ISBN 978-0-226-00069-5
- Department and discipline: Chicago sociology at one hundred. Chicago: University of Chicago Press, 1999 ISBN 978-0-226-00099-2
- Chaos of disciplines. Chicago: University of Chicago Press, 2000 ISBN 978-0-226-00101-2
- Time matters: on theory and method. Chicago: University of Chicago Press, 2001 ISBN 978-0-226-00103-6
- Methods of discovery: heuristics for the social sciences. New York: W.W. Norton & Company, 2004 ISBN 978-0393978148
- Digital paper: a manual for research and writing with library and internet materials. Chicago: University of Chicago Press, 2014 ISBN 978-0-226-16778-7
- Processual Sociology. Chicago: University of Chicago Press, 2016 ISBN 978-0-226-33662-6
