= Gilbert Ritschard =

Swiss statistician, expert in sequence analysis for social sciences

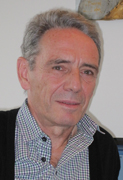
- Gilbert Ritschard
- Born: March 24, 1950 (age 76); Geneva, Switzerland
- Education: University of Geneva
- Known for: Contributions to sequence analysis and in particular the development of the TraMineR sequence-analysis toolkit.
- Spouse: Christiane (Comte) Ritschard
- Scientific career
- Fields: Quantitative research, Statistics, Sequence analysis
- Workplaces: University of Geneva
- Doctoral advisor: Emilio Fontela
- Other academic advisors: Luigi Solari, Edouard Rossier

Gilbert Ritschard (born March 24, 1950) is a Swiss statistician specialized in quantitative methods for the social sciences and in the analysis of longitudinal data describing life courses. He is Professor Emeritus at the University of Geneva. He earned a Ph.D. in Econometrics and Statistics at the University of Geneva in 1979. His main contributions are in sequence analysis. He initiated and led the SNFS project that developed the TraMineR R toolkit for sequence analysis. He is one of the founders of the Sequence Analysis Association, which he served as first president.

== Scholarly career ==
Gilbert Ritschard graduated in 1973 in quantitative economics, earned a diploma in econometrics in 1975, and his Ph.D. in econometrics and statistics in 1979, all at the Department of Econometrics of the University of Geneva. In his doctoral dissertation titled (in French) Contribution à l'analyse des structures qualitatives des modèles économiques [Contributions to the analysis of the qualitative structures of economic models], he developed powerful algorithms for solving qualitative systems of linear equations, i.e., systems where only the sign of the coefficients are known. Such qualitative systems (introduced by Paul Samuelson in his Foundations of Economic Analysis) are of special interest in comparative static analysis. During his time as a student, he served as teaching and research assistant at the Department of Econometrics.

After his Ph.D., Gilbert Ritschard worked during a few months at the United Nations Conference on Trade and Development (UNCTAD) where he participated at the development of a large-scale economic model (see thesis back cover.) He then spent one year as professor at the Department of Economics of the Université du Québec à Montréal before returning to Geneva as maître-assistant [assistant professor] in statistics. In 1986 he was nominated as associate professor of quantitative methods for the social sciences and was promoted as full professor in 1994. Gilbert Ritschard taught as visiting professor in Fribourg, Lausanne, Toronto, and Lyon (Ritschard's CV.) He was one of the promoters of the Swiss National Center of Competence in Research LIVES: Overcoming vulnerability, a Life Course Perspective where he led the quantitative group from 2011 to 2018.

Along his career, his research interest first moved from econometrics and mathematical economics to social statistics, data mining and machine learning, and later to demography and life course analysis. A continuous salient characteristic of Gilbert Ritschard's research is interdisciplinarity as shown by his multiple collaborations with, among others, computer scientists, demographers, historians, sociologists, political scientists, and psychologists.

Selected scholarly works:

- Mathematical economics
- Regression diagnostics
- Path analysis
- Data mining
- Tree methods
- Life course
- Sequence analysis: exploration, clustering, and visualization, discrepancy analysis, measures of dissimilarities, representative sequences, probabilistic suffix trees, sequence indicators, multidomain/multichannel analysis, possible impact of timing errors
