= Sequence clustering =

In bioinformatics, sequence clustering algorithms attempt to group biological sequences that are somehow related. The sequences can be either of genomic, "transcriptomic" (ESTs) or protein origin. For proteins, homologous sequences are typically grouped into families. For EST data, clustering is important to group sequences originating from the same gene before the ESTs are assembled to reconstruct the original mRNA.

Some clustering algorithms use single-linkage clustering, constructing a transitive closure of sequences with a similarity over a particular threshold. UCLUST and CD-HIT use a greedy algorithm that identifies a representative sequence for each cluster and assigns a new sequence to that cluster if it is sufficiently similar to the representative; if a sequence is not matched then it becomes the representative sequence for a new cluster. The similarity score is often based on sequence alignment. Sequence clustering is often used to make a non-redundant set of representative sequences.

Sequence clusters are often synonymous with (but not identical to) protein families. Determining a representative tertiary structure for each sequence cluster is the aim of many structural genomics initiatives.

== Sequence clustering algorithms and packages ==
- CD-HIT
- UCLUST in USEARCH
- Starcode: a fast sequence clustering algorithm based on exact all-pairs search.
- OrthoFinder: a fast, scalable and accurate method for clustering proteins into gene families (orthogroups)
- Linclust: first algorithm whose runtime scales linearly with input set size, very fast, part of MMseqs2 software suite for fast, sensitive sequence searching and clustering of large sequence sets
- TribeMCL: a method for clustering proteins into related groups
- BAG: a graph theoretic sequence clustering algorithm
- JESAM: Open source parallel scalable DNA alignment engine with optional clustering software component
- UICluster: Parallel Clustering of EST (Gene) Sequences
- BLASTClust single-linkage clustering with BLAST
- Clusterer: extendable java application for sequence grouping and cluster analyses
- PATDB: a program for rapidly identifying perfect substrings
- nrdb: a program for merging trivially redundant (identical) sequences
- CluSTr: A single-linkage protein sequence clustering database from Smith-Waterman sequence similarities; covers over 7 mln sequences including UniProt and IPI
- ICAtools - original (ancient) DNA clustering package with many algorithms useful for artifact discovery or EST clustering
- Skipredudant EMBOSS tool to remove redundant sequences from a set
- CLUSS Algorithm to identify groups of structurally, functionally, or evolutionarily related hard-to-align protein sequences. CLUSS webserver
- CLUSS2 Algorithm for clustering families of hard-to-align protein sequences with multiple biological functions. CLUSS2 webserver

== Non-redundant sequence databases ==
- PISCES: A Protein Sequence Culling Server
- RDB90
- UniRef: A non-redundant UniProt sequence database
- Uniclust: A clustered UniProtKB sequences at the level of 90%, 50% and 30% pairwise sequence identity.
- Virus Orthologous Clusters: A viral protein sequence clustering database; contains all predicted genes from eleven virus families organized into ortholog groups by BLASTP similarity

== See also ==
- Cluster analysis
- Social sequence analysis
