= David Grusky =

American sociologist (born 1958)

David B. Grusky
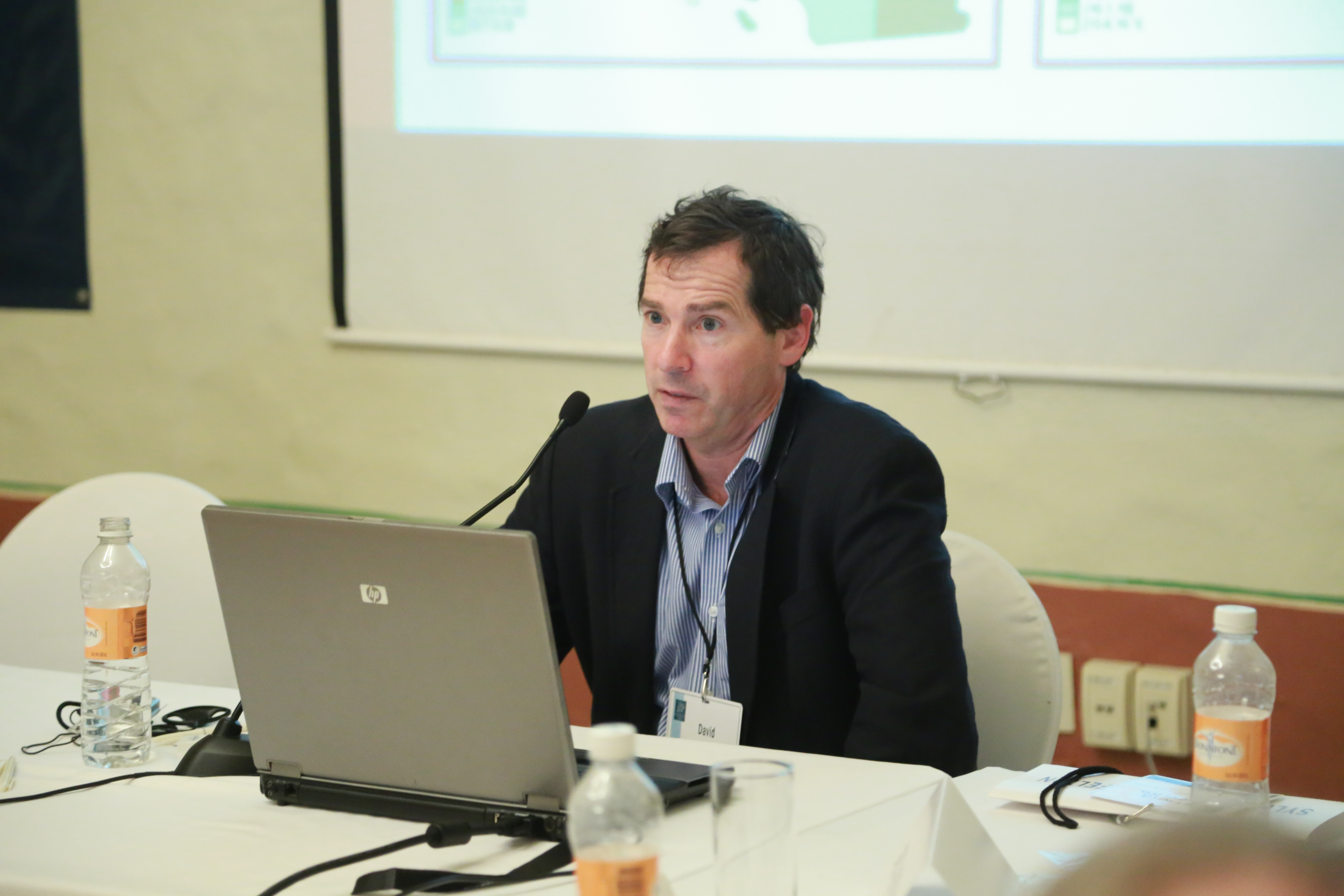
- David B. Grusky in 2015
- Born: April 14, 1958 (age 68)
- Education: Reed College; University of Wisconsin–Madison
- Known for: Social inequality Social mobility
- Awards: 2004 Max Weber Award
- Scientific career
- Fields: Sociology
- Workplaces: Stanford University
- Thesis: American Social Mobility in the Nineteenth and Twentieth Centuries (1986)
- Doctoral advisor: Robert M. Hauser
- Doctoral students: Kim Weeden

David Bryan Grusky (born April 14, 1958) is an American sociologist and academic renowned for his work on social inequality, economic stratification, and mobility. He is the Barbara Kimball Browning Professor in the School of Humanities and Sciences at Stanford University and serves as the founding director of the Stanford Center on Poverty and Inequality. He formerly taught at Cornell University and the University of Chicago. Grusky's research combines sociological theory to investigate the systemic causes and consequences of inequality, with a particular focus on income disparities, social class, microclass occupations and intergenerational mobility.

He was elected a Member of the National Academy of Sciences in 2025.

== Early life and education ==
Grusky pursued his academic studies in sociology, focusing on social structures, inequality, and mobility. He completed his Bachelor of Arts (B.A.) in Sociology at Reed College in 1980 where he was a member of Phi Beta Kappa. Following his undergraduate studies, he enrolled at the University of Wisconsin-Madison.

At Wisconsin, Grusky earned his Master of Science (M.S.) in sociology in 1983. His master's thesis, titled American Social Mobility in the Nineteenth and Twentieth Centuries (Class Structure, Social Stratification, United States), explored historical patterns of mobility and stratification in the United States, laying the groundwork for his future research. His thesis is cataloged under OCLC 1194705454 and ProQuest 303517481.

Grusky completed his Doctor of Philosophy (Ph.D.) in sociology at the University of Wisconsin-Madison in 1987.

== Academic career ==
Grusky began his academic career shortly after completing his doctorate in sociology at the University of Wisconsin-Madison.

=== Early academic roles (1986–1997) ===
Grusky's first academic appointment was as an assistant professor in the Department of Sociology at the University of Chicago (1986–1988). During his tenure, he focused on developing his research agenda in social mobility and class structure while teaching undergraduate and graduate courses in sociology.

In 1988, Grusky joined Stanford University as an assistant professor in the Department of Sociology, marking the beginning of a long association with the institution. He was promoted to associate professor in 1992 and served as the Associate Chair of the Department of Sociology from 1992 to 1996. In 1997, he was promoted to professor of sociology, cementing his reputation as a leading scholar in the field.

While at Stanford during this period, Grusky's research gained prominence for its focus on occupational segregation and the structural dynamics of inequality. He also began mentoring graduate students who would go on to become notable sociologists in their own right.

=== Cornell University and the founding of the Center for the Study of Inequality (1997–2004) ===
In 1997, Grusky accepted a position at Cornell University, where he became the founding director of the Center for the Study of Inequality. As the director, he established the center as a hub for interdisciplinary research on social stratification and inequality, integrating perspectives from sociology, economics, and public policy.

At Cornell, Grusky also held the position of Professor of Sociology and continued to expand his research on class structures, intergenerational mobility, and gender inequality in labor markets. During this time, he also served as an Honorary Fellow in the Department of Sociology at his alma mater, the University of Wisconsin-Madison (1997–1998).

=== Return to Stanford and leadership roles (2004–present) ===
Grusky returned to Stanford University in 2004, where he resumed his position as a professor in the Department of Sociology. In 2005, he was named the director of the Stanford Center on Poverty and Inequality, a position he continues to hold. Under his leadership, the center has become one of the foremost institutions for studying inequality in the United States, producing influential reports, fostering interdisciplinary research, and shaping policy debates.

== Views on social inequality ==
Grusky is known for his contributions to the study of social inequality, particularly his work on social stratification, income inequality, and the concept of microclass occupations. His research focuses on the structural mechanisms that sustain disparities in wealth, income, and opportunity.

=== Microclass occupation theory ===
Grusky introduced the concept of microclass occupations as an alternative to traditional class-based analyses of social stratification. While broad class categories, such as the working class, middle class, upper-middle class, and upper class, have historically been used to analyze inequality, Grusky argues that individual occupations—such as "teachers," "engineers," or "carpenters"—function as distinct social units with their own norms, networks, and hierarchies. This perspective challenges the assumption that class boundaries alone dictate economic outcomes and instead emphasize significance of occupation-specific structures in shaping economic and social mobility.

These microclasses play a pivotal role in reproducing inequality because occupations serve as sites of social closure, where individuals in the same occupational group often develop shared cultural identities, life chances, and economic trajectories. Certain occupations grant privileged access to resources, social capital, and job security, while others limit economic mobility. For instance, elite professions such as law, finance, and politics tend to be highly credentialed and network-driven, making access to these fields dependent on inherited advantages rather than meritocratic achievement.

A prominent example of this is the Bush family, which has produced multiple generations of political leaders, including Prescott Bush (U.S. senator), George H.W. Bush (41st U.S. president), and George W. Bush (43rd U.S. president). The family's long-standing involvement in politics and finance demonstrates how microclass occupations can reinforce social stratification. Prescott Bush attended Yale University, where he was a member of the elite secret society, Skull and Bones, a powerful networking organization that has historically facilitated entry into high-status professions. His son, George H.W. Bush, also attended Yale and was a member of Skull and Bones. Similarly, George W. Bush followed this occupational pathway, attending Yale as a legacy student (and joined Skull and Bones), benefiting from elite networks, and later ascending to the presidency. This example illustrates David Grusky's point that micro-level occupational markers—like elite college attendance and membership in exclusive networks—play a critical role in reproducing social stratification. By leveraging these seemingly modest advantages, the Bush family perpetuates a cycle of privilege that reinforces broader societal hierarchies.

Similarly, Justice Neil Gorsuch on the United States Supreme Court has two parents who are lawyers. In addition, his grandfather was also a prominent lawyer. Moreover, Justice Brett Kavanaugh, also on the United States Supreme Court, has two parents who are lawyers.

=== Mechanisms of microclass stratification ===
The microclass framework emphasizes that occupational boundaries—rather than broad class categories—are the primary mechanisms of social reproduction. Several key mechanisms underpin this theory:

1. Intergenerational transmission of occupations
  - The phenomenon of occupational inheritance reveals a complex interplay between social structures, family dynamics, and individual career trajectories. Beyond simple statistical correlations, this transmission represents a nuanced mechanism of social reproduction that challenges simplistic notions of meritocracy and individual choice. Empirical research demonstrates that the likelihood of following a parent's professional path extends far beyond mere statistical chance. This pattern is particularly pronounced in professions that require specialized knowledge, extensive training, or have strong cultural or familial traditions. For instance, medical families often see multiple generations of doctors, with children exposed to professional networks, medical discourse, and cultural capital from an early age. Working-class occupations equally demonstrate this intergenerational continuity. Trades such as plumbing, construction, electrical work, and manufacturing frequently see skills, professional connections, and vocational knowledge passed directly from parents to children. This transmission occurs through apprenticeship-like learning, early workplace exposure, and the social capital embedded within family and community networks.
2. Occupational closure and credentialism
  - The mechanisms of occupational reproduction are sophisticated and multifaceted, with credentialism serving as a powerful gatekeeping instrument. Professional associations, licensing boards, and educational institutions create intricate barriers that effectively restrict mobility between occupational strata. These closure mechanisms extend beyond formal credentials. They include:
    - Complex certification processes
    - Expensive educational requirements
    - Informal mentorship networks
    - Professional socialization that begins early in one's familial and social environment
    - Tacit knowledge transfer that is difficult to acquire outside established networks Such dynamics create what sociologists term "occupational ghettos" - self-perpetuating economic and social ecosystems where professional identities are deeply entrenched and relatively impermeable to external intervention
3. Social and Cultural Capital Within Occupations
  - Drawing extensively on Pierre Bourdieu's and David Grusky's theoretical frameworks, occupational groups function as intricate social ecosystems. These are not merely labor markets but complex social networks characterized by intergenerational knowledge transfer, mentorship pathways, insider referral systems, and shared cultural vocabularies and professional habits. The network effects within these occupational groups are profound. They not only facilitate professional reproduction but also contribute to persistent wage disparities, labor market segmentation, and social stratification. The implications are significant: while individual agency and merit play roles in career development, the structural conditions of occupational transmission suggest that professional success is far more socially determined than many mainstream narratives of individual achievement would suggest. While Pierre Bourdieu emphasizes the role of cultural capital and habitus in reproducing social order, Grusky focuses on micro-level occupational transmission—highlighting mechanisms such as intergenerational knowledge transfer, mentorship pathways, insider referral systems, and shared professional habits—which together facilitate professional reproduction, sustain wage disparities, and reinforce labor market segmentation and social stratification.

=== Implications for labor market stratification ===
Grusky's research on microclasses challenges dominant economic models of inequality by demonstrating that occupational segregation is more persistent than previously understood. His findings suggest that:

- Occupational mobility is lower than broad class models predict, with microclass barriers preventing movement across certain professions.
- Gender and racial disparities are reinforced at the microclass level, as women and minorities remain concentrated in lower-paying, highly feminized or racialized occupations.
- Labor market policies should account for microclass dynamics, as policies aimed at broad class groups may fail to address occupation-specific inequalities.

==== Broader themes in social stratification ====
Grusky's work also engages with broader questions about the persistence of inequality and its structural foundations. His research addresses several key themes:

- Intergenerational mobility: Grusky has examined how socioeconomic advantages are transmitted across generations. He argues that occupational structures, particularly those defined by microclasses, often restrict mobility and reinforce existing inequalities, even in societies that purport to value meritocracy.
- Income inequality and labor market polarization: Grusky has studied the increasing polarization of labor markets, which has led to the growth of both high-income elite professions and low-wage service jobs, with a decline in middle-income occupations. This "hourglass economy," he suggests, has intensified income inequality and reduced opportunities for economic mobility.

== Publications ==
=== Books ===
- The New Gilded Age: The Critical Inequality Debates of Our Time (2011, with Tamar Kricheli-Katz)
- The Great Recession (2011, with Bruce Western and Chris Wimer)
- Occupy the Future (2012, with Doug McAdam, Robert Reich, and Debra Satz)
- Social Stratification: Class, Race, and Gender in Sociological Perspective (2014, with Kate Weisshaar)
- Inequality in the 21st Century: A Reader (2017, with Jasmine Hill)

=== Articles and journals ===
Grusky has published in sociological and interdisciplinary journals, including:

- American Sociological Review
- Annual Review of Sociology
- Social Forces

== Honors and awards ==
Grusky is a fellow of the American Association for the Advancement of Science and a former Presidential Young Investigator. He was the joint winner of the 2005 Max Weber Award from the American Sociological Association.

== Professional membership ==
Grusky is a member of the American Academy of Arts and Sciences, American Sociological Association, American Statistical Association, Midwest Sociological Society, and over a dozen other professional organizations in the fields of sociology, inequality, and poverty.
