= Linda Waite =

American sociologist

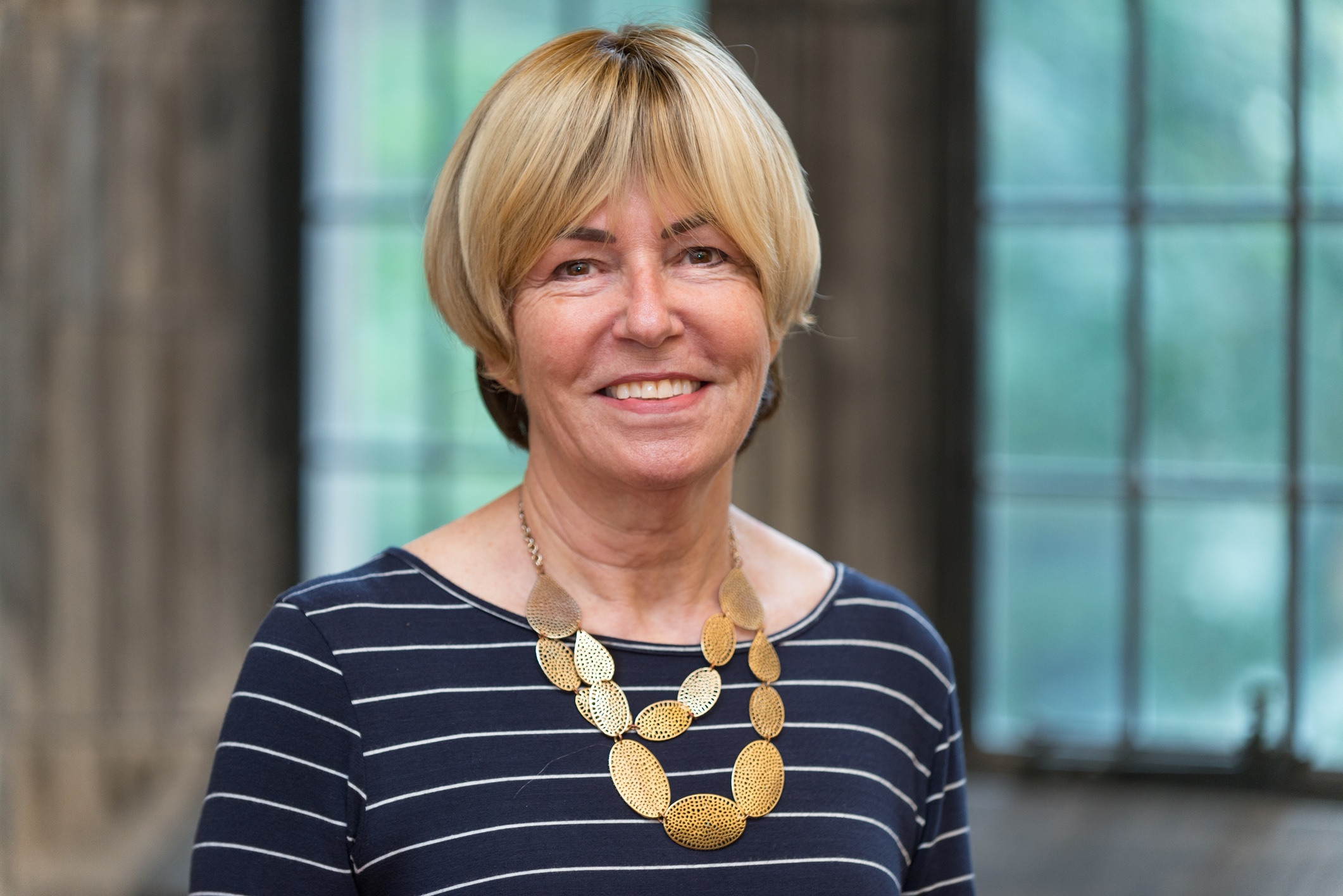
- Linda Joan Waite
- Known for: Contributions to research on life-course theory, marriage patterns, and family formation

Academic background
- Education: Michigan State University (BA); University of Michigan (MA, PhD)
- Thesis: Working Wives and the Life Cycle (1976)
- Doctoral advisor: Ronald Freedman
- Other advisors: Malmcolm S. Cohen, Karen Oppenheim Mason, Paul M. Siegel

Academic work
- Institutions: University of Chicago
- Notable students: Marin Clarkberg, Benjamin Cornwell, Kara Joyner, Sanyu Mojola, Jaclyn Wong, Erin York Cornwell

Linda Joan Waite is a sociologist and social demographer. She is the George Herbert Mead Distinguished Service Professor of Sociology at the University of Chicago. Waite is also a Senior Fellow at the NORC at the University of Chicago and Principal Investigator on the National Social Life, Health, and Aging Project (NSHAP). In 2018, she was elected to the American Academy of Arts and Letters.

== Education and career ==
Waite has a B.A. from Michigan State University (1969), and an M.A. (1970) and a Ph.D. (1976) from the University of Michigan. She was named the George Herbert Mead Distinguished Service professor in 2020. At the University of Chicago, Waite has served as Chair of the Department of Sociology, the director of the Center on Aging at NORC at the University of Chicago, and was co-director of the Center on Parents, Children, and Work at the Alfred P. Sloan Working Families Center (1997–2006). Waite is currently a Senior Fellow at NORC at the University of Chicago and is the Principal Investigator for the National Social Life, Health, and Aging Project (NSHAP), where her work on biomarkers and pharmaceutical data on population-based aging research has yielded groundbreaking knowledge about the sexual behavior of older Americans. She also serves as co-director of the University of Chicago's MD/PhD Program in Medicine, the Social Sciences, and Aging. Waite was the director of several centers and programs at RAND and past president of the Population Association of America.

== Work ==
Waite's work uses empirical data to study the dynamics underlying major social changes that impact the life courses of individuals and families. Waite's research topics have covered women's entry into the labor market, patterns of marriage and family formation, and, more recently, population aging and health. A central focus of Waite's research on aging is the examination of marital quality and sexuality as critical components of health and well-being in later life. Waite's early work on marriage showed it improves health and lengthens life. This early research led to the development of the National Social Life, Health and Aging Project (NSHAP), which provides data used by Waite to examine public discourse on later life sexuality, and demonstrates that sexuality is not just the province of the young.

== Selected publications ==
- Waite, Linda J. (1995). "Does Marriage Matter?". Demography. 32 (4): 483–507. doi:10.2307/2061670. ISSN 0070-3370. JSTOR 2061670. PMID 8925942.
- Waite, Linda J.; Gallagher, Maggie (2000). The Case for Marriage: Why Married People are Happier, Healthier, and Better Off Financially. Doubleday.
- Waite, Linda J.; Bachrach, Christine; Hindin, Michelle; Thomson, Elizabeth; Thornton, Arland, eds. (2000). Ties that Bind: Perspectives on Marriage and Cohabitation. Aldine de Gruyter.
- Hughes, Mary Elizabeth; Waite, Linda J.; Hawkley, Louise C.; Cacioppo, John T. (2004). "A Short Scale for Measuring Loneliness in Large Surveys". Research on Aging. 26 (6): 655–672. doi:10.1177/0164027504268574. ISSN 0164-0275. PMC 2394670. PMID 18504506.
- Hughes, Mary Elizabeth; Waite, Linda J.; Hawkley, Louise C.; Cacioppo, John T. (2004). "A Short Scale for Measuring Loneliness in Large Surveys". Research on Aging. 26 (6): 655–672. doi:10.1177/0164027504268574. ISSN 0164-0275. PMC 2394670. PMID 18504506.
- Schneider, Barbara; Waite, Linda J., eds. (2005). Being together, working apart : dual-career families and the work-life balance. New York: Cambridge University Press.
- Waite, Linda J. (ed.). Aging, Health, and Public Policy: Demographic and Economic Perspectives. New York: Population Council.
- Lindau, Stacy Tessler; Schumm, L. Philip; Laumann, Edward O.; Levinson, Wendy; O'Muircheartaigh, Colm A.; Waite, Linda J. (2007-08-23). "A Study of Sexuality and Health among Older Adults in the United States". New England Journal of Medicine. 357 (8): 762–774. doi:10.1056/NEJMoa067423. ISSN 0028-4793. PMC 2426743. PMID 17715410.
- Cornwell, Erin York; Waite, Linda J. (2009). "Social Disconnectedness, Perceived Isolation, and Health among Older Adults". Journal of Health and Social Behavior. 50 (1): 31–48. doi:10.1177/002214650905000103. ISSN 0022-1465. PMC 2756979. PMID 19413133.
- Waite, Linda J.; Plewes, Thomas, eds. (2013). Perspectives on the Future of the Sociology of Aging. Washington, DC: National Academies Press.

== Press ==
A collection of podcasts and webinars Waite has been featured on can be found below.

- Waite, Linda J. 2021. “Loneliness is Associated with High-Risk Medication Use in Older Adults.” NEJM Journal Watch Audio General Medicine. New England Journal of Medicine.
- Cagney, Kate and Linda Waite. 2021. Doing Social Science During COVID. Artifact Interview. The University of Chicago Francis and Rose Yuen Campus in Hong Kong.
- 100 Year Lives in Asia. 2020. Social Relationship and COVID-19. 100YLA Panelist. Yuen Lecture Series. 100-Year Lives in Asia. University of Chicago Center in Hong Kong. Webcast, April 30.
- Waite, Linda J. 2019. Why Your Social Life is a Matter of Life and Death with Linda Waite (Ep. 29). Big Brains Podcast. University of Chicago.

== Awards and honors ==
In 2012, Waite received the Matilda White Riley Award from the NIH Office of Behavioral and Social Research. In 2016, she received the Matilda White Riley Award for career achievement from the Section on Aging and the Life Course of the American Sociological Association. She was elected as a member of the American Academy of Arts and Sciences in 2018. Waite also received a MERIT Award from the National Institute on Aging during the years 2013 through 2018 for her work on NSHAP, and she was presented the Section on Aging and the Life Course's Matilda White Riley Distinguished Scholar Award in 2017 as well as the Family Section's Distinguished Career Award in 2019 by the American Sociological Association.
