= Fred Strodtbeck =

American sociologist

- Born: June 10, 1919; Middletown, Ohio
- Died: August 7, 2005 (aged 86)
- Education: Miami University; Indiana University Bloomington; Harvard University
- Known for: Contributions to Group dynamics, Scientific jury selection, Gang research
- Spouse: Olive Stedman
- Scientific career
- Fields: Sociology, Social psychology, Sociology of law
- Workplaces: University of California, Los Angeles; Yale University; University of Chicago
- Doctoral advisor: Florence Kluckhohn, Robert Freed Bales
- Notable students: Erin York Cornwell, Robert A. Gordon

Fred Louis Strodtbeck (June 10, 1919 - August 7, 2005) was an American sociologist. He is best known in science for his work on how small groups (like juries) choose their leaders. This led to his prominent role as the founder of the science of jury selection. He wrote extensively on value orientation, group dynamics, and gangs. He is also remembered for his role in the Chicago jury bugging scandal of 1955.

== Biography ==
Strodtbeck was born to Fred and Maxine Strodtbeck in Middletown, Ohio, in 1919. He earned his B.A. at Miami University in 1940 and then his M.A. in sociology from Indiana University Bloomington in 1942. His academic studies were interrupted by World War II, during which he served as an Army researcher. He served in the army from July 1943 to December 1945 and became a first lieutenant.

== Scholarly career ==
After World War II, Strodtbeck earned his Ph.D. in sociology at Harvard University and was hired as a professor of sociology at Yale University and later at the University of Chicago, where he spent the rest of his career. He pioneered the study of small-group dynamics, including how leaders are selected, and similar hierarchical social interactions within gangs. Some of this work was used to understand family household dynamics, especially between husbands and wives.

His work had its biggest impact on the study of jury deliberations, particularly with respect to how jury forepersons are chosen. This work has since shaped the study of jury selection, and the Voir dire process.

Throughout his career, Strodtbeck was a frequent collaborator of numerous influential social scientists, including Robert F. Bales, Urie Bronfenbrenner, Dorwin Cartwright, Clyde Kluckhohn, Florence Kluckhohn, and James Short, among others. His work continues to be cited heavily.

Toward the end of the McCarthy era, Strodtbeck helped to plan and execute a secret study of jury deliberations in Wichita, Kansas in 1954. This was part of the larger Chicago Law School Jury Project, which had been sanctioned by the then dean of the University of Chicago's law school, Edward H. Levi and approved by several judges. The team's goal was to understand more about how small group social dynamics shape such important legal decisions that are made by a jury of one's peers. They wanted to understand how people's legal decisions might be affected by group dynamics - such as differences in social status or gender among jurors (e.g., people deferring to the opinions of higher-status jurors).

Strodtbeck helped place recording devices in six jury rooms. Several secret recordings were made, and preliminary results and synopses of the team's findings were presented at an annual judicial conference in 1955. A Los Angeles Times article on the buggings led to a large number of additional news articles soon thereafter, which in turn led to a public outcry against prying into private jury deliberations. Ultimately, Strodtbeck had to testify before a U.S. Senate subcommittee about the nature of the recordings, and the project was shut down. This project is one of the earliest examples of an attempt to develop real-time data on decision making within small groups, particularly within the legal system.

== Selected scholarly works ==
- Strodtbeck, Fred L., Rita M. James, and Charles Hawkins. 1957. "Social Status in Jury Deliberations." American Sociological Review 22(6): pages 713-719.
- Strodtbeck, Fred L., and Richard D. Mann. 1956. "Sex Role Differentiation in Jury Deliberations." Sociometry 19(1): pages 3-11.
- Strodtbeck, Fred L., and L. Harmon Hook. 1961. "The Social Dimensions of a Twelve-Man Jury Table." Sociometry 24(4): pages 397-415.
- Strodtbeck, Fred L. 1951. "Husband-Wife Interaction over Revealed Differences." American Sociological Review 16(4): pages 468-473.
- Strodtbeck, Fred L. 1954. "The Family as a Three-Person Group." American Sociological Review 19(1): pages 23-29.
- Bales, Robert F., Fred L. Strodtbeck, Theodore M. Mills, and Mary E. Roseborough. 1951. "Channels of Communication in Small Groups." American Sociological Review 16(4): pages 461-468.
- Bales, Robert F., and Fred L. Strodtbeck. 1951. "Phases in Group Problem-Solving." The Journal of Abnormal and Social Psychology 46(4): page 485.
- Kluckhohn, Florence R., and Fred L. Strodtbeck. 1961. Variations in Value Orientations. Row, Peterson.
- Short, James F., and Fred L. Strodtbeck. 1965. Group Process and Gang Delinquency. Chicago: University of Chicago Press.
