= Erin York Cornwell =

Researcher

- Born: December 25, 1976 (age 49); Grand Island, Nebraska
- Education: Wellesley College, University of Chicago
- Known for: Contributions to Survey research, Sociology of law, Urban sociology
- Spouse: Benjamin Cornwell
- Scientific career
- Fields: Sociology of law, Urban sociology
- Workplaces: Cornell University
- Doctoral advisor: Linda Waite
- Other academic advisors: Edward Laumann, Kathleen Cagney

Erin York Cornwell (born December 25, 1976) is an American sociologist. She is associate professor of sociology at Cornell University. She earned her Ph.D. at the University of Chicago in 2008, where she worked with Linda Waite, Edward Laumann, and Kathleen Cagney. She specializes in survey research methods, and has made numerous contributions to sociology of law, urban sociology, and the sociology of health.

== Biography ==
Erin York Cornwell was born to Lowell and Mary Ellen (Walker) York in 1976 in Grand Island, Nebraska. Her father was an architect, and her mother worked at Waddell & Reed.

== Scholarly career ==
York Cornwell earned her B.A. in sociology in 1999 at Wellesley College and her M.A. and Ph.D. in sociology at the University of Chicago in 2008. Her dissertation (Household Disorder) documented the structural factors that shape the social and physical conditions within households - as a parallel to classical sociological investigations of social and physical disorder and disorganization within neighborhoods.

During her time at Chicago, she was a teaching assistant to Edward Laumann, research assistant to Robert J. Sampson, and was the first project coordinator for the National Social Life, Health, and Aging Project. She was the last research assistant to the sociologist, Fred Strodtbeck, who studied group dynamics, value orientation, and gangs - and is the founder of the science of jury selection. He is also known for his involvement in the Chicago Jury project of 1953-1959, during which the research team had to testify before Congress for surreptitiously bugging jury deliberations.

She is best known for her work distinguishing between the concepts of perceived or subjective social isolation (social-psychological) and objective forms of social disconnectedness (structural). This work has led to thousands of survey-related studies of social networks in different languages, and policy applications in urban senior centers.

She has been principal investigator on several large projects involving neighborhoods, social inequality, and law. These have led to studies of the prevalence and impact of inaccuracies in individuals' criminal records, how neighborhood context affects health, as well as several studies that improve upon previous survey research by using smartphones to track how real-time experiences with the social environment affect people.

== Honors and awards ==
In 2012, she was named a Sesquicentennial Faculty Fellow at Cornell University, and in 2015 she was named a fellow of the Institute for the Social Sciences (now the Cornell Center for Social Sciences). In 2018, she won the Appel Fellowship for Humanists and Social Scientists, which recognizes faculty achievements in teaching and research.

== Selected scholarly works ==
- York Cornwell, Erin. 2016. “Household Disorder, Network Ties, and Social Support in Later Life.” Journal of Marriage and Family 78:871-889.
- York Cornwell, Erin and Linda J. Waite. 2012. “Social Network Resources and Management of Hypertension.” Journal of Health and Social Behavior 53:215-231
- York Cornwell, Erin and Valerie P. Hans. 2011. “Representation through Participation: A Multilevel Analysis of Jury Deliberations.” Law & Society Review 45:667-698
- York Cornwell, Erin and Linda J. Waite. 2009. “Social Disconnectedness, Perceived Isolation, and Health among Older Adults.” Journal of Health and Social Behavior 50(1):31-48.
