= American Society of Trial Consultants =

Created in 1982, The American Society of Trial Consultants, Inc. is the only professional organization for litigation and trial consulting. It is the industry driver for standards in practical small group research, effective witness protection and preparation, and informed jury selection. The mission of the ASTC is to "[Make] the most of facts, law and presentation skill," and "...help litigators become better at persuading jurors and other fact-finders [to make] the system work in a way that is more meaningful, more reliable, and ultimately more fair."

== History ==
The concept of trial consulting was virtually unheard of until the 1971 trial of the "Harrisburg Seven", a group of priests and nuns who were charged with anti-Vietnam War activities. This was the first time that psychologists and sociologists officially supported a litigation team in a criminal trial. Although they were not paid for their consulting services, the idea of incorporating behavioral science in preparing for litigation was born.

Throughout the 1970s, litigation teams utilized this budding concept of trial consulting to impact their outcomes, including the Joan Little criminal trial, the Angela Davis trial, the Wounded Knee trials, trials stemming from the Attica prison riots, the trial of Mark David Chapman (John Lennon's assassin), Vietnam Veterans Against the War, Vietnam veterans against the manufacturers of Agent Orange, the trials of Attorney General John Mitchell and defendant Maurice Stans (Watergate), and Colombian drug lord Carlos Lehder, among others. In a majority of these cases, the verdict favored the side which used a trial consultant. This led to a heightened interest in standardizing practices for the burgeoning field of study.

On October 9, 1982, a small group of twenty-four practicing trial consultants met in Phoenix, Arizona to discuss the future and longevity of trial consulting as a profession. Major contributors to the field were there, including Dick Crawford, Stuart Kenter, Lin Lilley, Ron Matlon, Melissa McMath Hafield, Scott Nobles, Jack Parker, Mo Rouse, Joyce Tsongas, Vivian Dicks, Robert Hirsch, Elizabeth Loftus, Diana Prentice, and Lucy Keele. This group, originally known as the Association of Trial Behavior Consultants created a set of standards and practices for trial consultants that has guided the industry for more than thirty years.

Three years later, in 1985, the name of the organization was officially changed to the American Society of Trial Consultants, Inc.
