= Kluckhohn and Strodtbeck's values orientation theory =

Theory on universal problems in human societies

Kluckhohn and Strodtbeck's values orientation theory (put forward in 1961) proposes that all human societies must answer a limited number of universal problems, that the value-based solutions are limited in number and universally known, but that different cultures have different preferences among them.

Suggested questions include humans' relations with time, nature and each other, as well as basic human motives and the nature of human nature. Florence Kluckhohn and Fred Strodtbeck suggested alternate answers to all five, developed culture-specific measures of each, and described the value orientation profiles of five southwestern United States cultural groups. Their theory has since been tested in many other cultures, and used to help negotiating ethnic groups understand one another, and to examine the inter-generational value changes caused by migration. Other theories of universal values (Rokeach, Hofstede, Schwartz) have produced value concepts sufficiently similar to suggest that a truly universal set of human values does exist and that cross-cultural psychologists are close to discovering what they are.

== See also ==
- Anthropology
- Cross-cultural studies
