= Jason Beckfield =

American sociologist

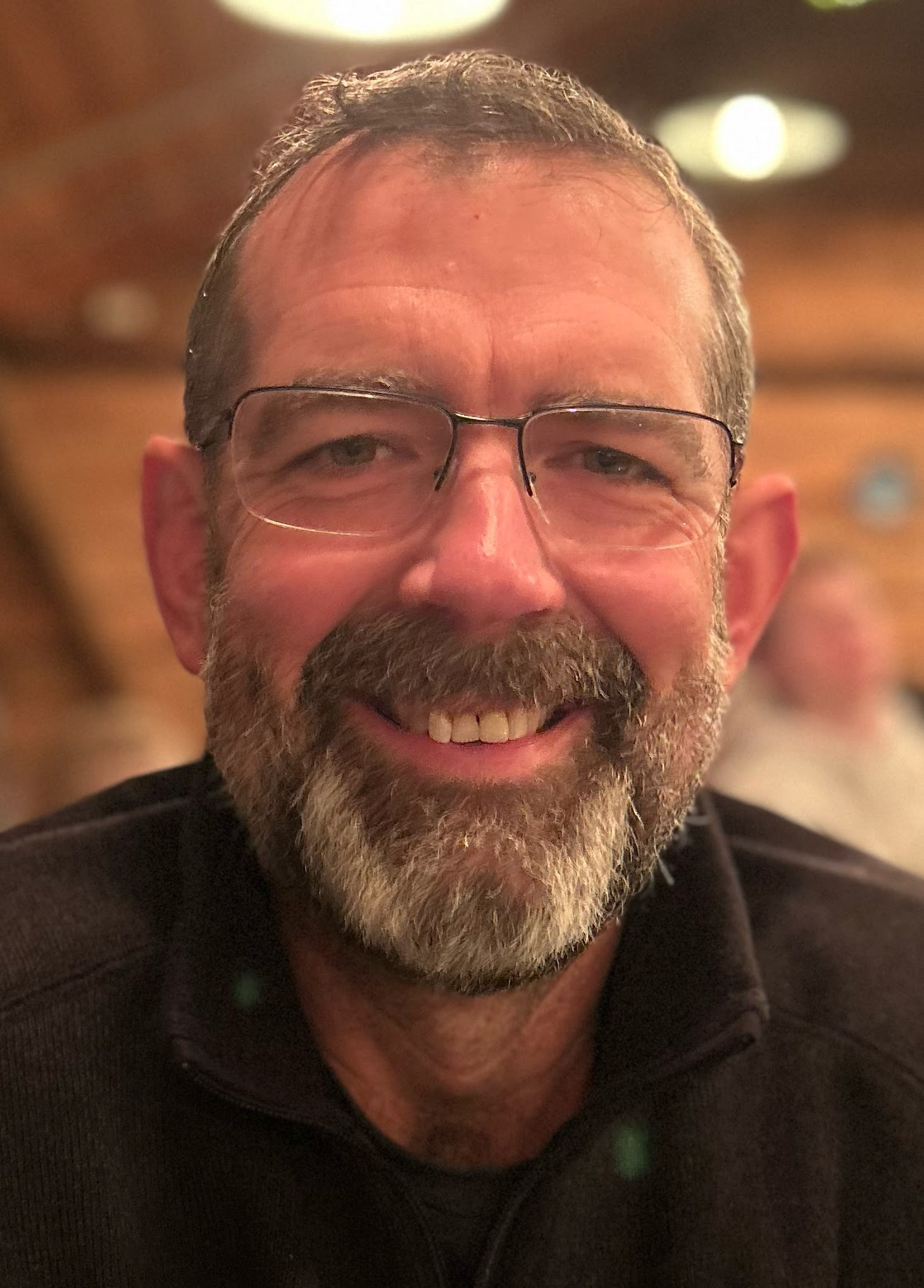
- Jason Beckfield (Boston, Massachusetts, 2022)
- Born: March 17, 1976 (age 50)
- Education: Indiana University
- Known for: Contributions to social inequality, political sociology, population health, and climate change.
- Scientific career
- Fields: Sociology
- Workplaces: Harvard University University of Chicago
- Doctoral advisor: Arthur Alderson
- Other academic advisors: Clem Brooks, Patricia McManus, Robert V. Robertson
- Notable students: Benjamin Cornwell, Anny Fenton, Benjamin Sosnaud, Linda Zhao

Jason Beckfield is an American sociologist. He is the Robert G. Stone Jr. Professor of Sociology at Harvard University.

== Early life ==
Jason Beckfield was born to Cathy and Albert Beckfield in 1976. He grew up in Joplin, Missouri and graduated from Truman State University. He earned his Ph.D. in sociology from Indiana University, Bloomington.

== Career ==
Beckfield was an assistant professor of sociology at the University of Chicago from 2004 to 2007. He joined Harvard University as assistant professor in 2007, and became a tenured professor in 2011. He later served as the department chair. He is an affiliate scholar of the Stanford Center on Poverty & Inequality at Stanford University. He is also the associate director of the Center for Population and Development Studies at Harvard .

His research focuses on social inequality, especially in the European Union. He has also written about world polity theory. His work has been published in numerous outlets, including American Journal of Public Health, American Journal of Sociology, American Sociological Review, and Annual Review of Sociology, among others.

He is perhaps best known for his work documenting the role that different cities play in connecting international networks of investment and trade, giving rise to a world city system. This approach has helped to refine and expand work on the world system. His research shows persistent inequality in different countries' ties to international non-governmental organizations (INGOs) – levels that rival world income inequality. His book, Unequal Europe: Regional integration and the rise of European inequality, shows how growing integration among European national economies has simultaneously increased inequality among European households.

His work also shows how the structure of national political systems and income inequality combine to perpetuate consequential health inequities within societies.

He was a member of the Editorial Board for Journal of World-Systems Research.

== Personal life ==
Beckfield has two children.

== Selected scholarly works ==
- Beckfield, Jason. 2019. Unequal Europe: How Regional Integration Reshaped the Welfare State and Reversed the Egalitarian Turn. Oxford University Press.
- Beckfield, Jason. 2018. Political Sociology and the People’s Health. Oxford University Press.
- Alderson, Arthur S. and Jason Beckfield. 2004. “Power and Position in the World City System.” American Journal of Sociology 109:811-851.
- Beckfield, Jason. 2010. “The Social Structure of the World Polity.” American Journal of Sociology 115:1018–68.
- Beckfield, Jason. 2006. “European Integration and Income Inequality.” American Sociological Review 71:964-85
- Beckfield, Jason. 2003. “Inequality in the World Polity: The Structure of International Organization.” American Sociological Review 68:401-424.
- Beckfield, Jason and Arthur S. Alderson. 2006. “Whither the Parallel Paths? The Future of Scholarship on the World City System.” American Journal of Sociology 112:895-904.
- Beckfield, Jason, Sigrun Olafsdottir, and Ben Sosnaud. 2013. “Healthcare Systems in Comparative Perspective: Classification, Convergence, Institutions, Inequalities, and Five Missed Turns.” Annual Review of Sociology 39:127–146.
