= Kim Weeden =

American sociologist

Kim A. Weeden
- Education: Willamette University; Stanford University
- Known for: Contributions to research on Social inequality
- Scientific career
- Fields: sociology
- Workplaces: University of Chicago; Cornell University
- Doctoral advisor: David Grusky
- Other academic advisors: Michael T. Hannan, C. Matthew Snipp, Nancy Tuma

Kim A. Weeden is an American sociologist. She is a professor of sociology at Cornell University, where she is also a Stephen H. Weiss Presidential Fellow and the Jan Rock Zubrow '77 Professor of the Social Sciences. Weeden studies income inequality, the gender wage gap, and what determines the professions that different people enter and the academic majors that students select. She primarily uses large-scale surveys to study these topics.

== Education and early work ==
Weeden grew up in Alaska, and attended Willamette University, earning both a BA in sociology and a BS in psychology. She then received an MA in sociology from Stanford University in 1993, and a PhD in sociology there in 1999.

After graduating with her PhD, Weeden joined the faculty of Sociology at the University of Chicago, where she was also affiliated with the Alfred P. Sloan Center on Parents, Children, and Work, as well as the Population Research Center. In 2001, she moved to Cornell University.

== Career ==
=== Academic positions ===
Weeden was the Chair of the Department of Sociology at Cornell University from 2007 until 2010, and then began a second term as chair in 2015. Beginning in 2013, she was the Director of the Center for the Study of Inequality at Cornell University. Since 2015, Weeden has been the Jan Rock Zubrow '77 Professor of sociology at Cornell. In 2019, Weeden was named a Stephen H. Weiss Presidential Fellow, which is Cornell's highest honor for teaching.

=== Research ===
The primary focus of Weeden's work has been income inequality, with particular attention to the sources and consequences of the gender wage gap. Her findings are largely quantitative results that rely on large-scale national surveys. She has also studied the relationship between the income of a student's family and their choice of academic major.

In 2002, Weeden published the article "Why do Some Occupations Pay More than Others? Social Closure and Earnings Inequality in the United States", in which she uses the neo-Weberian theory of closures (the sociological phenomenon in which groups maintain their resources by defining criteria by which to exclude others from the group) to explain the variation in wages for 488 occupations. The article won the 2004 Richard S. Scott Award for Distinguished Scholarship from the Organizations, Occupations, and Work section of the American Sociological Association.

In a 2014 paper, "Overwork and the Slow Convergence in the Gender Gap in Earnings" in the American Sociological Review, Weeden and Youngjoo Cha used data from the Current Population Survey between 1979 and 2009 to study why women's increasing participation and expertise in the labor market has not made more of an impact in decreasing the gender wage gap. They demonstrate that one cause is the increasing prevalence of overwork, which involves working more hours than the regular work day and sometimes for increased pay; since this is predominantly done by men, the increase in overwork also increases the gap in wages. This paper won the 2015 Outstanding Article Award from the Inequality, Poverty, and Mobility section of the American Sociological Association.

Weeden also contributed a chapter, called "Profiles of Change: Sex Segregation in the United States, 1910–2000", to Maria Charles and David B. Grusky's volume Occupational Ghettos: The Worldwide Segregation of Men and Women, which won the 2005 Max Weber Award for Distinguished Scholarship from the Organizations, Occupations, and Work section of the American Sociological Association.

Weeden was one of the founding co-editors of the journal Sociological Science, and has been an editor of the American Journal of Sociology and the Industrial and Labor Relations Review.

A Sociological Science paper that Weeden coauthored with Sarah Thébaud and Dafna Gelbgiser, called "Degrees of Difference: Gender Segregation of U.S. Doctorates by Field and Program Prestige", was covered in Science magazine because of its novel explanations for the gender gap in doctoral programs. Weeden's work has also been cited in outlets like The New York Times, The Wall Street Journal, and The Atlantic.
