= Optimal matching =

Sequence analysis in social science

Optimal matching is a sequence analysis method used in social science, to assess the dissimilarity of ordered arrays of tokens that usually represent a time-ordered sequence of socio-economic states two individuals have experienced. Once such distances have been calculated for a set of observations (e.g. individuals in a cohort) classical tools (such as cluster analysis) can be used. The method was tailored to social sciences from a technique originally introduced to study molecular biology (protein or genetic) sequences (see sequence alignment). Optimal matching uses the Needleman-Wunsch algorithm.

== Algorithm ==
Let $S = (s_1, s_2, s_3, \ldots s_T)$ be a sequence of states $s_i$ belonging to a finite set of possible states. Let us denote ${\mathbf S}$ the sequence space, i.e. the set of all possible sequences of states.

Optimal matching algorithms work by defining simple operator algebras that manipulate sequences, i.e. a set of operators $a_i: {\mathbf S} \rightarrow {\mathbf S}$. In the most simple approach, a set composed of only three basic operations to transform sequences is used:

- one state $s$ is inserted in the sequence $a^{\rm Ins}_{s'} (s_1, s_2, s_3, \ldots s_T) = (s_1, s_2, s_3, \ldots, s', \ldots s_T)$
- one state is deleted from the sequence $a^{\rm Del}_{s_2} (s_1, s_2, s_3, \ldots s_T) = (s_1, s_3, \ldots s_T)$ and
- a state $s_1$ is replaced (substituted) by state $s'_1$, $a^{\rm Sub}_{s_1,s'_1} (s_1, s_2, s_3, \ldots s_T) = (s'_1, s_2, s_3, \ldots s_T)$.

Imagine now that a cost $c(a_i) \in {\mathbf R}^+_0$ is associated to each operator. Given two sequences $S_1$ and $S_2$, the idea is to measure the cost of obtaining $S_2$ from $S_1$ using operators from the algebra. Let $A={a_1, a_2, \ldots a_n}$ be a sequence of operators such that the application of all the operators of this sequence $A$ to the first sequence $S_1$ gives the second sequence $S_2$: $S_2 = a_1 \circ a_2 \circ \ldots \circ a_{n} (S_1)$ where $a_1 \circ a_2$ denotes the compound operator. To this set we associate the cost $c(A) = \sum_{i=1}^n c(a_i)$, that represents the total cost of the transformation. One should consider at this point that there might exist different such sequences $A$ that transform $S_1$ into $S_2$; a reasonable choice is to select the cheapest of such sequences. We thus call distance
$d(S_1,S_2)= \min_A \left \{ c(A)~{\rm such~that}~S_2 = A (S_1) \right \}$
that is, the cost of the least expensive set of transformations that turn $S_1$ into $S_2$. Notice that $d(S_1,S_2)$ is by definition nonnegative since it is the sum of positive costs, and trivially $d(S_1,S_2)=0$ if and only if $S_1=S_2$, that is there is no cost. The distance function is symmetric if insertion and deletion costs are equal $c(a^{\rm Ins}) = c(a^{\rm Del})$; the term indel cost usually refers to the common cost of insertion and deletion.

Considering a set composed of only the three basic operations described above, this proximity measure satisfies the triangular inequality. Transitivity however, depends on the definition of the set of elementary operations.

== Criticism ==
Although optimal matching techniques are widely used in sociology and demography, such techniques also have their flaws. As was pointed out by several authors (for example L. L. Wu), the main problem in the application of optimal matching is to appropriately define the costs $c(a_i)$.

== Software ==
- TDA is a powerful program, offering access to some of the latest developments in transition data analysis.
- STATA has implemented a package to run optimal matching analysis.
- TraMineR is an open source R-package for analyzing and visualizing states and events sequences, including optimal matching analysis.
