= Gerardo L. Munck =

Argentine-American political scientist (born 1958)

- Born: October 13, 1958 (age 67); Buenos Aires, Argentina
- Education: University of California, San Diego
- Occupations: Professor, political scientist
- Known for: Comparative politics

Gerardo L. Munck is a political scientist specializing in comparative politics. He is professor of political science and international relations at the University of Southern California.

== Career ==
Munck earned his undergraduate degree in political science from the University of New Hampshire, a master's in Latin American studies at Stanford University, and his PhD in political science from the University of California, San Diego (UCSD). Munck was a professor at the University of Illinois, Urbana-Champaign between 1990 and 2002, before moving to the University of Southern California (USC).

== Academic research ==
Munck works in the field of comparative politics specializing in political regimes, democracy, and methodology. His recent work focuses on democracy and its relationship to the state, on critical junctures, and on politics in Latin America.

Munck is also known for his research in the field of the science of knowledge and his oral histories of leading scholars in political science and comparative politics.

=== Democracy ===
One of Munck's recurring research interests has been democracy. He has written on the conceptualization and measurement of democracy, and on the theorization of democracy.

==== The conceptualization and measurement of democracy ====
Munck's award winning article with Jay Verkuilen “Conceptualizing and Measuring Democracy" (2002) introduced a widely used distinction between issues of conceptualization, measurement, and aggregation. In his book Measuring Democracy (2009) and in an article work with Jørgen Møller and Svend-Erik Skaaning (2020), Munck elaborated this framework and argued that, "counter to an empiricist approach to measurement," attention should be placed "squarely on theoretical concepts" and "the link between theoretical concepts and measures."

==== Problems of and for democracy ====
In Latin American Politics and Society: A Comparative and Historical Analysis (2022) and “Democracy and the State in Latin America” (2023), Munck has introduced the distinction between problems of democracy, "problems linked to the attainment, maintenance, and deepening of democracy," and problems for democracy, "problems related to the results generated by democracy." Munck argues that "the problems of democracy prevent the reduction of problems for democracy, and unresolved problems for democracy block the possibility of reducing the problems of democracy" and that this dynamic generates a suboptimal equilibrium.

==== Democracy and the state ====
Munck has advanced the argument that state capacity affects democracy and that democracy also affects state capacity. In A Middle-Quality Institutional Trap: Democracy and State Capacity in Latin America (2020), with Sebastián Mazzuca, he maintains that "States can make democracy and democracy can make States," but that they do so "only under certain macroconditions, which trigger the causal mechanisms that make the State–democracy interaction a virtuous cycle." Contrary to the thesis of Francis Fukuyama that a capable state can only be built before transitioning to democracy, he shows that many countries have developed their state capacity in parallel with their democratization process or after democratization.

Munck has extended this analysis in the context of 21st-century Latin American democracies. In “Democracy and the State in Latin America” (2023), he argues that "the trajectory of democracy in Latin America will be largely determined by what is done or not done to build a state that serves its citizens effectively, efficiently, and equitably." In his article "The State as a Determinant of Democracy" (2024), Munck elaborates on the mechanisms by which Latin American states, which he characterizes as semipatrimonial, affect democracy and generate low-quality but resilient democracies.

In “Democracy in Latin America” (2026), he introduced the idea of a Latin American triangle of the 21st-century. This triangle is conformed by (1) low-quality democracies, (2) states with public administrations that have patrimonial and only partially neo-Weberian characteristics, and (3) capitalism with low growth and large inequalities of income and wealth.

=== Critical junctures ===
Munck edited with David Collier a book on Critical Junctures and Historical Legacies: Insights and Methods for Comparative Social Science (2022). The book provides a review of theoretical and methodological ideas related to critical junctures and many examples of substantive research that uses the critical juncture framework. Munck defines a critical juncture as “(1) a rapid, discontinuous, macro-level change, and (2) a distal cause that generates a historical legacy or, more precisely, has a persistent effect via a causal cycle—a causal chain that includes a repeated cause-effect pair.” He also proposes a reconstruction of the critical juncture framework that shows how it can integrate explanation of statics and dynamics.

=== Knowledge in the social sciences ===
One line of Munck's work focuses on the production of knowledge in the social sciences.

==== Oral histories ====
He published two books with extensive interviews with leading scholars, which not only address their intellectual formation and the social context of their research but also how they go about the research process and wrote their influential works.

One book of interviews, Passion, Craft, and Method in Comparative Politics (2007), with Richard Snyder, covers the intellectual careers of fifteen scholars: Gabriel Almond, Barrington Moore, Robert Dahl, Juan José Linz, Samuel P. Huntington, Arend Lijphart, Guillermo O'Donnell, Philippe Schmitter, James C. Scott, Alfred Stepan, Adam Przeworski, Robert H. Bates, David Collier, David D. Laitin, and Theda Skocpol.

Another book of interviews, El pensamiento sociopolítico latinoamericano (Latin American Sociopolitical Thought) (2023), with Martín Tanaka, focuses on the contributions of ten Latin American sociologists and political scientists: Fernando Henrique Cardoso, Rodolfo Stavenhagen, Edelberto Torres Rivas, Marta Harnecker, Julio Cotler, Guillermo O'Donnell, Francisco Leal Buitrago, Marcelo Cavarozzi, Manuel Antonio Garretón, and Elizabeth Jelin.

==== The evolution of Comparative Politics ====
Munck also offers the following periodization for the evolution of modern comparative politics, as a field of political science - understood as an academic discipline - in the United States:

- 1. The Constitution of Political Science as a Discipline, 1880–1920
- 2. The Behavioral Revolution, 1921–66
- 3. The Post-Behavioral Period, 1967–88
- 4. The Second Scientific Revolution 1989–present

Munck also specifies several trends in the field since the turn of the century.

- End of the pretense of rational choice theory to hegemonize the field
- Lack of a unifying metatheory
- Greater attention to causal inference, and increased use of experimental methods.
- Continued use of observation methods, including qualitative methods.
- New concern with a "hegemony of methods" as theorizing is not given as much attention.

== Work with International Organizations ==
=== United Nations Development Programme (UNDP) ===
Munck collaborated with Dante Caputo and Guillermo O'Donnell in the preparation of the United Nations Development Programme’s (UNDP) report Democracy in Latin America. Toward a Citizens’ Democracy (2004).

He also worked with Dante Caputo on a second regional report on democracy in Latin America prepared by the UNDP and the Organization of American States (OAS), Nuestra democracia (2010).

With the UNDP, he elaborated a system to monitor corruption in Afghanistan, and wrote background papers for the UNDP regional reports on Asia and the Pacific on corruption and gender equality.

=== Organization of American States (OAS) ===
Munck developed a methodology to monitor elections for the Organization of American States (OAS).

=== Open Government Partnership (OGP) ===
Munck was a member of the inaugural International Experts Panel of the Open Government Partnership.

=== Organization of Ibero-American States (OEI) ===
Munck was appointed as a member of the High-Level Expert Commission which supports the Human Rights, Democracy and Equality Program, of the Organization of Ibero-American States for Education, Science and Culture (OEI).

== Personal life ==
Munck's grandmother is swimmer Lilian Harrison. His brother is sociologist Ronaldo Munck.

== Selected publications ==
=== Books and Edited Volumes ===
Progress in the Social Sciences: Scientific Research and the Quest for Knowledge about Democracy (Cambridge University Press, forthcoming, 2027).

The Theoretical Foundations of Democracy Studies: Concepts, Causes, and Outcomes (Cambridge University Press, forthcoming, 2026).

El pensamiento sociopolítico latinoamericano: Ciencias sociales e intelectuales en tiempos cambiantes (with Martín Tanaka; Prometeo, 2023)

Latin American Politics and Society: A Comparative and Historical Analysis (with J.P. Luna; Cambridge University Press, 2022).

Critical Junctures and Historical Legacies: Insights and Methods for Comparative Social Science, co-editor with David Collier (Rowman & Littlefield, 2022).

A Middle-Quality Institutional Trap: Democracy and State Capacity in Latin America (with Sebastián L. Mazzuca; Cambridge University Press, 2020).

La calidad de la democracia: Perspectivas desde América Latina, co-editor with Sebastián Mantilla Baca (Quito, Ecuador: CELAEP and Fundación Hans Seidel, 2013).

Measuring Democracy: A Bridge between Scholarship and Politics (Johns Hopkins University Press, 2009).

Passion, Craft, and Method in Comparative Politics (with Richard Snyder; Johns Hopkins University Press, 2007).

Regimes and Democracy in Latin America, editor (Oxford University Press, 2007).

“Regimes and Democracy in Latin America”, co-editor with David Collier. Special Issue of Studies in Comparative International Development 36, 1 (Spring 2001): 3–141.

Authoritarianism and Democratization: Soldiers and Workers in Argentina, 1976-83 (Penn State University Press, 1998).

=== Articles ===
“La democracia en América Latina: Apuntes para una discusión.” Revista Latinoamericana sobre Democracia 2, 2 (2026): 7-29.

“The State as a Determinant of Democracy: Durable Poor-Quality Democracies in Contemporary Latin America.” Democratization 31, 2 (2024): 341-65.

“Las ciencias sociales y el pensamiento sociopolítico latinoamericano,” pp. 15–43, in Gerardo L. Munck and Martín Tanaka, El pensamiento sociopolítico latinoamericano: Ciencias sociales e intelectuales en tiempos cambiantes, Buenos Aires, Argentina: Prometeo, 2023.

"Introduction: Tradition and Innovation in Critical Juncture Research," pp. 1–29, in David Collier and Munck (eds.), Critical Junctures and Historical Legacies: Insights and Methods for Comparative Social Science, Lanham, MD: Rowman & Littlefield, 2022.

“The Theoretical Foundations of Critical Juncture Research: Critique and Reconstruction,” pp. 109–37, in David Collier and Munck (eds.), Critical Junctures and Historical Legacies: Insights and Methods for Comparative Social Science, Lanham, MD: Rowman & Littlefield, 2022.

“Quantitative Methods and Critical Junctures: The Strengths and Limits of Quantitative History,” pp. 183–205, in David Collier and Munck (eds.), Critical Junctures and Historical Legacies: Insights and Methods for Comparative Social Science, Lanham, MD: Rowman & Littlefield, 2022.

“The Power and Promise of Critical Juncture Research,” pp. 389–401, in David Collier and Munck (eds.), Critical Junctures and Historical Legacies: Insights and Methods for Comparative Social Science, Lanham, MD: Rowman & Littlefield, 2022.

“Conceptualization and Measurement: Basic Distinctions and Guidelines,” pp. 331–52, in Luigi Curini and Robert Franzese (eds.), The SAGE Handbook of Research Methods in Political Science and International Relations, Vol. 1, with Jørgen Møller and Svend-Erik Skaaning. Thousand Oaks, CA: Sage, 2020.

“Comparative Politics at a Crossroad: Problems, Opportunities and Prospects from the North and South,” with Richard Snyder. Política y Gobierno (Mexico) 26, 1 (2019): 139-58.

“Modernization Theory as a Case of Failed Knowledge Production.” The Annals of Comparative Democratization 16, 3 (2018): 37-41.

"Building Blocks and Methodological Challenges: A Framework for Studying Critical Junctures," with David Collier, Qualitative and Multi-Method Research 15, 1 (2017).

"What is Democracy? A Reconceptualization of the Quality of Democracy." Democratization, 23, 1 (2016): 1-26.

"Building Democracy … Which Democracy? Ideology and Models of Democracy in Post-Transition Latin America." Government and Opposition 50, 3 (2015): 364-93.

"State or Democracy First? Alternative Perspectives on the State-Democracy Nexus," with Sebastián L. Mazzuca. Democratization 21, 7 (2014): 1221-43.

“Debating the Direction of Comparative Politics: An Analysis of Leading Journals,” with Richard Snyder, Comparative Political Studies 40, 1 (2007): 5-31.

"Democratic Politics in Latin America: New Debates and Research Frontiers." Annual Review of Political Science 7 (2004): 437-62.

"Tools for Qualitative Research," pp. 105–21, in Henry E. Brady and David Collier (eds.), Rethinking Social Inquiry: Diverse Tools, Shared Standards, Boulder, Col. and Berkeley, Cal.: Rowman & Littlefield and Berkeley Public Policy Press, 2004.

"Conceptualizing and Measuring Democracy: Evaluating Alternative Indices," with Jay Verkuilen. Comparative Political Studies 35, 1 (2002): 5-34.

"The Regime Question: Theory Building in Democracy Studies." World Politics 54, 1 (2001): 119-44.

"Game Theory and Comparative Politics: New Perspectives and Old Concerns." World Politics 53, 2 (2001): 173-204.

"Modes of Transition and Democratization. South America and Eastern Europe in Comparative Perspective," with Carol Leff. Comparative Politics 29, 3 (1997): 343-62.

"Disaggregating Political Regime: Conceptual Issues in the Study of Democratization." Helen Kellogg Institute for International Studies Working Paper 228 (1996).
