= Sebastián Mazzuca =

Argentine professor

Sebastián L. Mazzuca
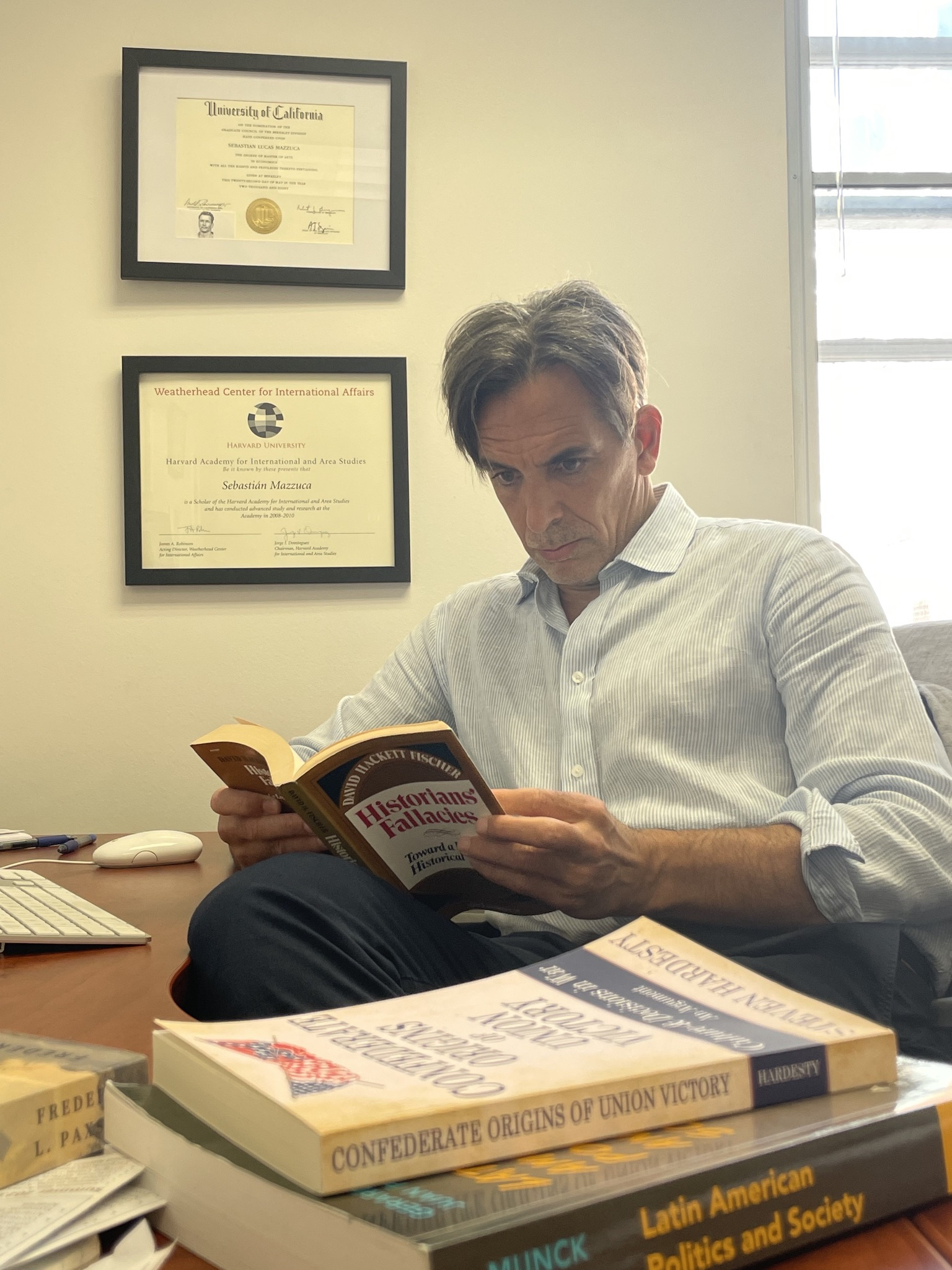
- Mazzuca in 2023
- Born: Adrogué; Provincia de Buenos Aires; Argentina
- Education: Universidad de Buenos Aires; University of California, Berkeley
- Known for: Comparative Politics; State formation State capacity Democracy; Political Economy; Latin America
- Scientific career
- Academic advisors: James A. Robinson; David Collier; Guillermo O'Donnell; Tulio Halperín Donghi; Strongly influenced by work of Max Weber and Fernand Braudel

Sebastián L. Mazzuca is a professor of political science specializing in comparative politics at Johns Hopkins University. He is known for his research on state formation, state capacity, regime change, political economy and Latin America.

== Career ==
Mazzuca earned his MA in economics and his PhD in political science from the University of California, Berkeley. He studied with David Collier and James A. Robinson.

After teaching at Harvard University (2010–12), and the National University of General San Martín in Buenos Aires (2013–14), in 2015 he began a position as assistant professor at Johns Hopkins University.

== Academic research ==
Mazzuca works in the field of comparative politics with a focus on state formation, economic development, and democracy. Mazzuca wrote Latecomer State Formation (Yale University Press, 2021), co-authored with Gerardo Munck Middle-Quality Institutional Trap (Cambridge University Press, 2020), published over a dozen articles in journals of political science in the US and the rest of the world, and edited three volumes on the relation between political institutions and economic development for CAF (Banco Latinoamericano de Desarrollo).

Mazzuca co-authored with Nobel prize-winner economist James A. Robinson the article "Political Conflict and Power Sharing in the Origins of Modern Colombia."

=== Latecomer State Formation (2021) ===
In Latecomer State Formation: Political Geography and Capacity Failure in Latin America, Mazzuca argues that, in contrast to Europe, trade, not war, created the countries of Latin America. But trade created weaker countries than war. A key theoretical claim is that state formation (border demarcation) was incompatible with state building (capacity creation) in Latin America because the rush to incorporate the region into global commerce induced the emergence of countries with dysfunctional territories, i.e., combinations of subnational regions that in the long run proved economically nonviable. This claim complements and refines the usual ideas that attribute all forms of economic and social backwardness in Latin America to colonial institutions.

In the second part of the book, the focus turns from the Western Europe vs Latin America contrast to variations within Latin America. Latecomer State Formation holds that three pathways were followed in forming Latin American states. These three paths are distinguished by the key agent in the process of state formation. (1) In the "port-driven pathway" - followed by Argentina and Brazil - territorial consolidation and violence monopolization were achieved simultaneously by a political entrepreneur deriving logistical and material resources from the main commercial port of the emerging country. The result was a "territorial colossus." (2) In the "party-driven pathway" - followed by Mexico and Colombia - there is "a temporal gap between territory consolidation and violence monopolization." However, these pathways created "states with large territories combining multiple economic regions." (3) Finally, the "lord-driven pathway" tends towards fragmentation and small states. Warlords break up large-scale territorial projects - the cases of "Antonio Páez in relation to Bolívar’s Gran Colombia (Colombia, Panama, Ecuador, and Venezuela), Rafael Carrera in relation to the Central American Federation, and Ramón Castilla in relation to the Peru-Bolivian Confederation." The result was smaller splinter states like Venezuela, Guatemala, and Peru.

The book was positively reviewed in Foreign Affairs, and academic journals in English and Spanish, including Governance, Political Studies, Latin American Research Review, the Journal of Historical Political Economy, Política y Gobierno, and Araucaria.

=== A Middle-Quality Institutional Trap (2020) ===
In A Middle-Quality Institutional Trap: Democracy and State Capacity in Latin America, co-authored with Gerardo Munck.

The book explores why many Latin American countries exhibit persistent mediocrity in both democratic governance and state capacity, rather than excelling or failing entirely in either domain. The authors argue that these countries are caught in a "middle-quality institutional trap"—a stable equilibrium where states are not effective and regimes are poorly democratic. This trap prevents the region from achieving the high-performing democracy and robust state apparatus seen in advanced industrialized nations.

The book challenges the conventional assumption that democracy and state capacity naturally reinforce each other. Instead, Mazzuca and Munck propose that the relationship between these two dimensions is contingent and often fraught with tension. They identify historical, structural, and political factors that lock Latin American states into this middling performance, drawing on a mix of theoretical frameworks and empirical evidence from the region.

The book was reviewed by the Bulletin of Latin American Research, the Journal of Historical Political Economy, and the Canadian Journal of Latin American and Caribbean Studies.

=== Access to power vs exercise of power ===
Mazzuca is known for introducing the distinction between access to power and the exercise of power. He argues that the distinction between authoritarianism and democracy concerns the access to power dimension. In contrast, the distinction between patrimonialism and bureaucracy concerns the exercise of power dimension. This distinction was used in a range of works, from scholarly books like Democrats and Autocrats by Professor Agustina Giraudy to opinion pieces in major Spanish-speaking newspapers.

=== Pristine states and the origins of civilization ===
Together with Ernesto Dal Bó and Pablo Hernández-Lagos, in "The Origins of Civilization: Prosperity and Security in the Formation of Pristine States in Sumeria and Egypt," Mazzuca advanced a conceptual and formal model to call attention to the fact that the rise of civilizations among humans is a paradox, and how it can be solved. The article was featured in CEPR and was recommended as a "Must Read" by Professor Bradford DeLong for the Washington Center for Equitable Growth.

=== Critical juncture theory ===
Mazzuca's work on state formation and on economic development has been seen as a contribution to critical juncture theory. Mazzuca traces the origins of Latin America's weak contemporary states to the distinctive process of state formation in the nineteenth century. He also attributes Latin America's poor economic performance in the twentieth century to the distinctive way in which states were formed in the nineteenth century, combining dynamic areas and backward peripheries.

== Public impact ==
- Latecomer State Formation was featured in The Economist, Foreign Affairs, Diario Perfil (Argentina), and El Comercio (Peru).
- A Middle-Quality Institutional Trap: Democracy and State Capacity in Latin America (with Gerardo L. Munck; Cambridge University Press, 2020) was chosen as one of the best five books on Latin American Democracy by Prof. Joe Foweraker.
- His work and political analysis was featured in The Economist, Associated Press, Clarin, La Nación, Revista Seúl, among others.

== Publications ==
=== Books ===
1. Mazzuca, Sebastián, Latecomer State Formation: Political Geography and Capacity Failure in Latin America, New Haven: Yale University Press, 2021.
2. Mazzuca, Sebastián L. and Gerardo L. Munck, A Middle‐Quality Institutional Trap: Democracy and State Capacity in Latin America. New York: Cambridge University Press, 2020.
3. Mazzuca, Sebastián L (editor). Desarrollo Institucional y Conflicto. De la Geopolítica a la Distribución del Ingreso. Buenos Aires: Corporación Andina de Fomento, 2017.
4. Mazzuca, Sebastián L (editor). Regímenes Políticos y Desarrollo. Orígenes y Consecuencias. Buenos Aires: Corporación Andina de Fomento, 2016.
5. Mazzuca, Sebastián L (editor). Economía Política del Crecimiento. Cadenas Causales y Mecanismos Institucionales. Buenos Aires: Corporación Andina de Fomento, 2015.

=== Select articles ===
1. Dal Bó, Ernesto, Pablo Hernández-Lagos, and Sebastián Mazzuca. "The Paradox of Civilization: Preinstitutional Sources of Security and Prosperity." American Political Science Review 116.1 (2022): 213–230.
2. Gans‐Morse, Jordan, Sebastián Mazzuca, and Simeon Nichter. "Varieties of Clientelism: Machine Politics During Elections." American Journal of Political Science 58.2 (2014): 415–432.
3. Mazzuca, Sebastián L. "Lessons from Latin America: The rise of rentier populism." Journal of democracy 24.2 (2013): 108–122.
4. Mazzuca, Sebastián, “Capacidad, Autonomía y Legitimidad. Revisando (de nuevo) los Atributos del Estado Moderno,” Revista de Ciencia Política 32.3 (2012): 545–560.
5. Mazzuca, Sebastián, “Macrofoundations of Regime Change: Democracy, State Formation, and Capitalist Development.” Comparative Politics 43.1 (2010): 1–19.
6. Mazzuca, Sebastián, “Access to Power Versus Exercise of Power: Reconceptualizing the Quality of Democracy in Latin America.” Studies in Comparative International Development 45.3 (2010): 334–357.
7. Collier, Ruth Berins, and Sebatián Mazzuca. "Does History Repeat?" The Oxford Handbook of Contextual Political Analysis 5 (2006): 472–489.

== External Links to Reliable Secondary Sources ==
- Sebastián Mazzuca on Google Scholar
- Sebastián Mazzuca on Academia.edu
- Sebastián Mazzuca on JSTOR
- Sebastián Mazzuca on Google Books
- Sebastián Mazzuca at Yale University Press
- Sebastián Mazzuca at Cambridge University Press
- Sebastián Mazzuca in books
- Sebastián Mazzuca in the news

== Relevant links ==
- Sebastián Mazzuca on JSTOR
- Sebastián Mazzuca on Google Scholar
- Sebastián Mazzuca in Books
- Sebastián Mazzuca in the News
- Sebastián Mazzuca's Personal Website
- Sebastián Mazzuca on X
