= Irene Osgood =

American novelist, poet, and playwright (died 1922)

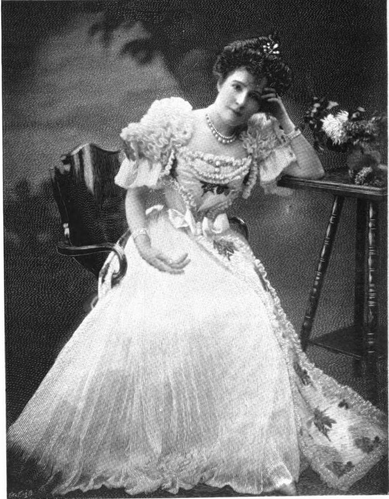
- Irene Osgood
- Born: 1868 or 1875; Norfolk, Virginia, United States
- Died: December 12, 1922; Guilsborough, Northamptonshire, England
- Occupations: Novelist, poet, playwright, publisher
- Spouse: John Cleveland Osgood (m. 1887; div. 1899) Charles Pigott Harvey (m. 1899; died 1904) Robert Harborough Sherard (m. 1908; div. 1915)

Irene Osgood (born 1868 or 1875 – 12 December 1922) was an American novelist, poet, playwright, and publisher. She wrote several novels, including The Shadow of Desire (1893) and Servitude (1908), as well as collections of poetry and short stories. In 1912, she established John Richmond Limited, a London publishing company that published books and Lord Alfred Douglas's literary magazine The Antidote.

== Early life and education ==
Sources differ on Osgood's birth year. Osgood gave her birth year as 1875 in Who's Who in America 1910-1911. However, scholar Kevin H. F. O'Brien argues that her marriage in 1887 and information provided by her siblings in their obituaries support a birth year of 1868.

Osgood was born Nannie Irene Belote in Norfolk, Virginia to John William Parker and Mary Virginia Chappell Belote. She was one of five children and spent her early years on her family's plantation. She was educated by private governesses and tutors. When Osgood was 16, her family began traveling in Europe, where she spent much of her early adulthood.

Sources differ on the spelling of Osgood's family name. Contemporary articles in The New York Times used "Belot," but her parents' marriage certificate and her brother's obituary use "Belote." While living in Europe, Osgood adopted the name Nonie Iréne de Belote.

== Career ==
Osgood's first novel, The Shadow of Desire, was published in 1893 by the Cleveland Publishing Company, which her first husband, John Cleveland Osgood, had established. The semi-autobiographical novel received a negative review in The Atlantic. Her second novel, An Idol's Passion (1895), was published by the Transatlantic Publishing Company. Her final book of the decade, The Chant of a Lonely Soul (1897), contained original poetry and adaptations of poems from Comte Robert de Montesquiou-Fezensac's Les Chauves Souris.

Nine years later, Osgood published To a Nun Confess'd: Letters from Yolande to Sister Mary (1906), an epistolary novel about an American woman unhappily married to an Englishman. The story unfolds through letters addressed to her friend, a nun. Servitude (1908) was among Osgood's better-known novels. Set in Algiers, the romance and adventure novel went through four editions.

Over the next several years, Osgood published the short-story collection A Blood Moon, The Buhl Cabinet and Other Stories from Algiers (1911), the fantasy work A Mother in Dreams (1912), the collection of sayings from her novels The Irene Osgood Thought Book (1913), and the prose-poetry collection Where Pharaoh Dreams (1914).

In 1914, Osgood collaborated with Horace Wyndham on The Winged Anthology: A Collection of Representative Poems Relating to Birds, Butterflies, and Moths, from 1536 to 1914. The two also collaborated on The Garden Anthology (1914), a collection of poetry about gardens. Osgood's final novel, The Indelicate Duellist, appeared that year.

Between 1912 and 1914, Osgood wrote several plays, of which only Une Aventure du Capitaine Lebrun (1913) received a professional production. It was performed at the Théâtre Molière in Paris in February 1913. Her other plays had copyright performances only.

=== Authorship dispute ===
In 1911, Osgood filed for divorce from her third husband, English author Robert Harborough Sherard, on the grounds of cruelty. During the divorce proceedings, Sherard claimed that he had written the books published under Osgood's name between 1906 and 1910, except for To a Nun Confess'd. Osgood disputed his claim, maintaining that Sherard had merely typed the manuscripts. Their divorce was finalized in 1915.

=== John Richmond Limited ===
In 1912, Osgood established the John Richmond Limited publishing company in London. Scholar Kevin H. F. O'Brien suggests that Osgood created the company partly to counter Sherard's claims that he had written her earlier works. Although she employed managers to oversee daily operations, Osgood remained the company's principal owner, financier, and decision-maker. However, she kept her connection to the firm anonymous, signing any correspondence as "John Richmond."

John Richmond Limited published several of Osgood's works, including A Mother in Dreams, Where Pharaoh Dreams, The Irene Osgood Thought Book, The Indelicate Duellist, The Winged Anthology, and The Garden Anthology. The company also issued reprints of A Blood Moon and To a Nun Confess'd. The company's manager from 1912-1913, T. W. H. Crosland, issued Crosland’s own The First Stone and Sonnets, Siegfried Sassoon’s The Daffodil Murderer under the pseudonym “Saul Kain,” and the first issues of Lord Alfred Douglas’s literary magazine The Antidote. Horace Wyndham, who managed the company in 1914, published his theatrical novels Limelight and Stage Struck, while the company also released S. Claude Tickell’s translation of Phaedra.

After the company suspended publishing during World War I, Coralie Norman was hired in 1918 to revive its operations.. She broadened the list with books by Temple Bailey, David Belasco, Regina Miriam Bloch, Kate Everest, Lilian Harrison, Frederic Arthur Stanley, L. D. Stranger, Gregory Saben, and Percy W. D. Izzard. These titles had limited commercial success, and the company ceased active publishing in 1919.

== Personal life ==
Osgood married three times and had no children. In June 1887, she married John Cleveland Osgood in New York. They divorced in July 1899. In August 1899, she married Charles Pigott Harvey. Harvey died in September 1904. In May 1908, Osgood married Robert Harborough Sherard in Paris. They divorced in 1915.

During World War I, Osgood allowed the Red Cross to use Guilsborough Hall, her Northamptonshire residence, as an auxiliary hospital. She was also awarded the Order of Mercy in recognition of her work managing three military hospitals in London. Osgood died of tuberculosis and heart disease at Guilsborough Hall on December 12, 1922.

== Selected works ==
=== Novels, short stories, and other writings ===
- The Shadow of Desire (1893)
- An Idol's Passion (1895)
- The Chant of a Lonely Soul (1897)
- To a Nun Confess'd: Letters from Yolande to Sister Mary (1906)
- Servitude (1908)
- A Blood Moon, The Buhl Cabinet and Other Stories from Algiers (1911)
- A Mother in Dreams (1912)
- The Irene Osgood Thought Book (1913)
- Where Pharaoh Dreams (1914)
- The Winged Anthology (1914)
- The Garden Anthology (1914)
- The Indelicate Duellist (1914)

=== Plays ===
- The Maid of Beb-Azour (1912)
- The Southern Widow (1912)
- The Demon Lover (1912)
- An Intense Interview (1912)
- Une Aventure du Capitaine Lebrun (1913)
- The Menace (1914)
