= Sultanism =

Form of personalized authoritarian government, not necessarily Islamic or Middle Eastern

In political science, sultanism is a form of authoritarian government characterized by the extreme personal presence of the ruler in all elements of governance. The ruler may or may not be present in economic or social life, and thus there may be pluralism in these areas, but this is never true of political power.

The term sultanism is derived from sultan, a title used in Muslim societies for a secular sovereign or monarch, often in contrast with the religious title of caliph. In modern scholarly usage, sultanism is not limited to Muslim or Middle Eastern societies. In 1996, Juan Linz and Alfred Stepan listed the clearest examples of sultanism as "Haiti under the Duvaliers, the Dominican Republic under Trujillo, the Central African Republic under Bokassa, the Philippines under Marcos, Romania under Ceaușescu, Iraq under Hussein and North Korea under Kim Il Sung". According to Linz and Stepan:

[T]he essential reality in a sultanistic regime is that all individuals, groups and institutions are permanently subject to the unpredictable and despotic intervention of the sultan, and thus all pluralism is precarious

In sultanism, the sultan may or may not adopt a ruling ideology, but he is never bound by any rules or given ideology, even his own. The sultan may also use whatever forces he can to exercise his personal will, such as paramilitaries or gangs as stated by Max Weber in Economy and Society:

[I]n the extreme case, Sultanism tend[s] to arise whenever traditional domination develops an administration and a military force which are purely instruments of the master. [...] Where domination [...] operates primarily on the basis of discretion, it will be called sultanism. [...] The non-traditional element is not, however, rationalized in impersonal terms, but consists only in the extreme development of the ruler's discretion. It is this which distinguishes it from every form of rational authority.

== See also ==
- Absolute monarchy
- Caliphate
- Cult of personality
- Despotism
- Dictatorship
- Monarchy
- Sultanate
- Tyranny
