= Hartmut Elsenhans =

German political scientist (1941–2024)

Hartmut Elsenhans (13 October 1941 – 18 January 2024) was a German political scientist. He was an emeritus professor of International Relations at the University of Leipzig.

== Biography ==
Hartmut Elsenhans was born in Stuttgart, Germany on 13 October 1941. After graduating high school in his hometown, Stuttgart, he studied political science, history, sociology and Romance studies at the University of Tübingen and the Free University of Berlin. After earning his Diplom there in 1967, Elsenhans moved to Paris where he was a member of the Cycle Supérieur d’Etudes Politiques, where the likes of Ralf Dahrendorf, Theodor Eschenburg, Alfred Grosser, Gerhard Lehmbruch and Gilbert Ziebura were among his teachers. From 1970 to 1975, Elsenhans was Ziebura's assistant. He earned his doctorate in 1973 with a study on the decolonization of Algeria in the Algerian War 1954 to 1962. In 1976, he gained habilitation at FU Berlin. The title of his professoral thesis was "History and Economy of the European global conquest from the age of discovery to World War I" (original German "Geschichte und Ökonomie der Europäischen Welteroberung. Vom Zeitalter der Entdeckungen bis zum Ersten Weltkrieg"). Throughout his career, he expanded his work on this topic, publishing a total of five volumes on the subject. In the late 1970s, he had short stints as a lecturer at the University of Montreal and the University of Frankfurt before settling down for his first professorship (of International Relations) at the University of Marburg. His focus there was on the analysis of underdevelopment and national and social emancipatory movements.

In 1980, he went to Konstanz for his second professorship, working on and with the administration and governance of developing countries and with international development organizations.

After German reunification, Elsenhans took the opportunity to go to Leipzig, to help build up the department of International relations at the university there. He taught there until 2007, when he retired. He was given honorary membership of the faculty of political science at the University of Leipzig. Elsenhans still resided, lectured and researched in Leipzig.

Elsenhans died in Leipzig, Germany on 18 January 2024, at the age of 82.

== Bibliography ==
- Saving Capitalism from the Capitalists. World Capitalism and Global History, Sage, 2014, 340 pages, ISBN 978-9-35-150056-8, content.
