= Capoccia =

Capoccia is an Italian surname. Notable people with the surname include:

- Giovanni Capoccia, Italian professor of political science
- Niccolà di Capoccia (died 1368), also known as Niccolò Capocci, Italian cardinal
