= Punctuated equilibrium in social theory =

Conceptual framework for understanding the process of change in complex social systems

Punctuated equilibrium in social theory is a conceptual framework for understanding the process of change in complex social systems. The approach studies the evolution of policy change, including the evolution of conflicts. The theory posits that most social systems exist in an extended period of stasis, which may be punctuated by sudden shifts leading to radical change. The theory was largely inspired by the evolutionary biology theory of punctuated equilibrium developed by paleontologists Niles Eldredge and Stephen Jay Gould.

== Development of theory ==
The punctuated equilibrium model of policy change was first presented by Frank Baumgartner and Bryan D. Jones in 1993, and has increasingly received attention in historical institutionalism. The model states that policy generally changes only incrementally due to several restraints, namely the "stickiness" of institutional cultures, vested interests, and the bounded rationality of individual decision-makers. Policy change will thus be punctuated by changes in these conditions, especially in party control of government, or changes in public opinion.

As a result, policy is characterized by long periods of stability, punctuated by large—though less frequent—changes due to large shifts in society or government. This has been particularly evident in current trends of environmental and energy policy. Gun control and U.S. federal tobacco policy have also been found to follow punctuated changes. A 2006 study by Michael Givel found that despite a significant mobilization to change state tobacco policy, U.S. state tobacco policymaking from 1990 to 2003 was not characterized by punctuated policy change, which also favored the pro-tobacco policy agenda.

A 2017 study demonstrates that these patterns are also found in policy-making by international organizations, such as the United Nations or the African Union. Applications of the theory have been in organizational theory, in the study of small work groups, in research on geographic communities and corporate behavior, and in the study of technological change.

Connie Gersick's research on the evolution of organizational systems (1988, 1991) revealed patterns of change mirroring those in biological species. Gersick examined models of change in six domains - developmental patterns of adults, groups and organizations, the history of science, physical science, and biological evolution - and found evidence for punctuated equilibria (as opposed to steady, incremental change) across those disparate systems.

As some researchers have noted, the biological applications of punctuated equilibrium have rejuvenated a new "theory about change within entities." At the same time, social scientific applications of the punctuated equilibrium concept have been criticized for losing sight of a core idea in the original biological theory of punctuated equilibrium: the notion that geographic location plays a significant role in determining which populations are subject to abrupt changes at a given time.

== See also ==
- Critical juncture theory
