= Miguel Centeno =

Miguel Centeno may refer to:

- Miguel Centeno (footballer), Mexican football goalkeeper
- Miguel A. Centeno, American sociologist
