= Bryan D. Jones =

American political scientist

- Education: University of Alabama (B.A.); University of Texas at Austin (Ph.D)
- Occupation: Political scientist

Bryan D. Jones is an American political scientist and public policy scholar. He holds the J. J. "Jake" Pickle Regents Chair in Congressional Studies at the University of Texas. He is an Academic Director of the Comparative Agendas Project, which has received more than $2,650,000 of National Science Foundation grant funding.

Jones' work includes the development of punctuated equilibrium in social theory - and critical juncture theory - and budget theory, and he has published academic articles in the American Political Science Review, the Journal of Politics, the American Journal of Political Science, the Policy Studies Journal, and others. The American Political Science Association has granted Jones numerous awards, including the Aaron Wildavsky Enduring Contribution Award for the book Agendas and Instability in American Politics, which he co-authored with Frank Baumgartner; and the Robert E. Lane Award for his books Politics and the Architecture of Choice and Reconsidering Decision-Making in Democratic Politics. In 2017, Jones was elected as a fellow of the National Academy of Public Administration.

== Selected publications ==
- Agendas and Instability in American Politics (co-authored with Frank Baumgartner, 1993)
- Reconceiving Decision-Making in Democratic Politics: Attention, Choice, and Public Policy (1994)
- Politics and the Architecture of Choice: Bounded Rationality and Governance (2001)
- The Politics of Attention: How Government Prioritizes Problems (co-authored with Frank Baumgartner, 2005)
- The Politics of Bad Ideas: The Great Tax Cut Delusion and the Decline of Good Government in America (co-authored with Walter Williams, 2007).
- The Politics of Information: Problem Definition and the Course of Public Policy in America (co-authored with Frank Baumgartner, 2014)
- The Southern Fault Line: How Race, Class, and Region Shaped One Family's History (2025)
