= Juan José Linz =

Spanish sociologist and political scientist (1926–2013)

- Born: Juan José Linz Storch de Gracia; 24 December 1926; Bonn, Germany
- Died: 1 October 2013 (aged 86); New Haven, Connecticut, U.S.
- Occupations: Sociologist; political scientist

Academic background
- Education: Complutense University of Madrid; Columbia University (PhD)

Academic work
- Discipline: Sociology; Political science
- Sub-discipline: Comparative politics
- Institutions: Columbia University; Yale University
- Notable students: Lin Chia-lung; Alfred Stepan; Arturo Valenzuela; Jan T. Gross; Houchang Chehabi; Miguel A. Centeno

Juan José Linz Storch de Gracia (24 December 1926 – 1 October 2013) was a German-born Spanish sociologist and political scientist specializing in comparative politics. From 1961 he was Sterling Professor Emeritus of Sociology and Political Science at Yale University and later also an honorary member of the Scientific Council at the Juan March Institute. He is best known for his work on authoritarian political regimes and democratization.

== Early life and education ==
Linz was born in Bonn, Germany in 1926. His mother, of Spanish origin, returned with him to Spain in 1932. He graduated with a degree in law and political science from the Complutense University of Madrid in 1947. He moved to New York in 1950 and was awarded a doctorate in sociology from Columbia University in 1959. He took classes with sociologists Robert K. Merton, Paul Lazarsfeld, Robert Staughton Lynd, and Kingsley Davis. He worked closely with Seymour Martin Lipset. He wrote a 900 page dissertation on "The Social Bases of West German Politics".

Linz became a professor at Columbia University in 1961 and remained in the faculty until 1969. After a brief stay in Spain to help develop courses for the new Autonomous University of Madrid, he returned to the United States and became a professor at Yale in 1969. He remained at Yale the rest of his life.He was a founding member of the International Sociological Association's (ISA) Committee of Political Sociology (CPS), along with Lipset, Raymond Aron, Shmuel Eisenstadt, and Stein Rokkan; and was President of the CPS in 1971–1979). He served as President of the Council for European Studies (1973–1974) and President of the World Association of Public Opinion Research (1974–1976). He was a member of ISA's Executive Committee (1974–1982) and its Scientific Committee (1974–1978).

As a professor, Linz supervised 65 dissertations. His students include Alfred Stepan, Arturo Valenzuela, Jan T. Gross, Houchang Chehabi, and Miguel A. Centeno.

== Personal life and death ==
Linz was married to Rocío de Terán.

On 1 October 2013, Linz died, aged 86, in New Haven, Connecticut.

== Awards and honors ==
Linz received the Prince of Asturias Award of Social Sciences (1987), the Johan Skytte Prize in Political Science (1996) and the Karl Deutsch Award (2003), in addition to honorary doctorates from several European universities.

Various awards are named after Linz:

- The Juan Linz Prize of the International Political Science Association (IPSA)
- The Juan Linz Prize for Best Dissertation in the Comparative Study of Democracy, of the Comparative Politics Section of the American Political Science Association (APSA)

== Academic research ==
In addition to his work on systems of government, he did extensive research on the breakdowns of democracy and the transition back to a democratic regime. He is the author of many works on the subject, including Totalitarian and Authoritarian Regimes (1975/2000), The Perils of Presidentialism (1990), and Problems of Democratic Transition and Consolidation: Southern Europe, South America, and Post-Communist Europe (1996, co-authored with Alfred Stepan). He has been called "one of the finest political sociologists in the world" and was "legendary for the encyclopedic breadth of his knowledge."

=== An Authoritarian Regime: Spain ===
One of Linz's early works focused on General Francisco Franco's Spain and classified Spain's political regime as an "authoritarian regime." This was an important innovation because at the time regimes tended to be classified as either democratic or totalitarian.

Linz defined authoritarianism as possessing four qualities:

- Limited political pluralism, realized with constraints on the legislature, political parties and interest groups.
- Political legitimacy based upon appeals to emotion and identification of the regime as a necessary evil to combat "easily recognizable societal problems, such as underdevelopment or insurgency".
- Minimal political mobilization, and suppression of anti-regime activities.
- Ill-defined executive powers, often vague and shifting, which extends the power of the executive.

=== Totalitarianism and Authoritarian Regimes ===
In this classic work, published in 1975 and republished in 2000, Juan Linz provides an encyclopedic classification of types of political regime that develops the fundamental distinction between totalitarian and authoritarian systems and also presents a discussion of sultanistic regimes. This work was foundational to the literature on authoritarianism. In this work Linz also provides as 'Litmus Test', a list of actions by politicians that can put democracy at risk. The list of actions are:

- A refusal to unambiguously disavow violence
- A readiness to curtail civil liberties
- The denial of legitimacy of an elected government.

=== The Breakdown of Democratic Regimes ===
The Breakdown of Democratic Regimes is a four volume coedited work with Alfred Stepan, that includes Linz's theoretical volume The Breakdown of Democratic Regimes. Crisis, Breakdown, and Reequilibriation. Linz focused on "how the people in power in a democratic regime, not just the opponents, played a decisive role in the overthrow of democracy." Regime breakdowns were contingent, non-inevitable events. This work "challenged Marxist theories, which highlighted economic causes, as well as other approaches that focused on opposition groups to explain why democratic regimes collapse."

=== Problems of Democratic Transition and Consolidation ===
This work on democratization, with Alfred Stepan, provides a cross-regional comparison of thirteen countries in South America, Southern Europe, and postcommunist Europe. It introduces a novel focus on stateness problems stemming from nationalist conflicts. It also argues that the type of old non-democratic regime affects subsequent trajectories of democratization. Linz's ideas about the impact of non-democratic regimes on the prospects of transitions to democracy launched a new strand in the literature on political regimes that explores the strengths and weaknesses of different types of authoritarian regimes.

== Selected publications ==
- Allardt, Erik; Littunen, Yrjö, eds. (1964). "An Authoritarian Regime: Spain". Cleavages, Ideologies and Party System. Contributions to Comparative Political Sociology. Helsinki: Westermarck Society. pp. 291–341.
- Dahl, Robert, ed. (1973). "Opposition to and under an Authoritarian Regime". Regimes and Oppositions. Yale University Press. pp. 171–259.
- Greenstein, Fred; Polsby, Nelson, eds. (1975). "Totalitarianism and Authoritarian Regimes". Macropolitical Theory. Handbook of Political Science. Vol. 3. Reading, MA: Addison-Wesley Press. pp. 175–411. Republished as Totalitarian and Authoritarian Regimes. Boulder, CO: Lynne Rienner. 2000.
- Linz, Juan J; Stepan, Alfred, eds. (1978). The Breakdown of Democratic Regimes. Johns Hopkins University Press. Four volumes.
- Linz, Juan J. (Juan José) (1990). "Perils of Presidentialism" (PDF). Journal of Democracy. 1: 51–69. doi:10.1353/jod.2005.0026. Archived from the original (PDF) on 2016-04-17.
- Linz, Juan J; Valenzuela, Arturo, eds. (1994). The Failure of Presidential Democracy. Johns Hopkins University Press. Two volumes.
- Linz, Juan J; Diamond, Larry; Lipset, Seymour Martin, eds. (1995). Politics in Developing Countries: Comparing Experiences with Democracy (2nd ed.). Boulder, CO: Lynne Rienner.
- Linz, Juan J; Stepan, Alfred, eds. (1996). Problems of Democratic Transition and Consolidation: Southern Europe, South America and Post-Communist Europe. Johns Hopkins University Press.
- Linz, Juan J; Chehabi, H E, eds. (1998). Sultanistic Regimes. Johns Hopkins University Press.
- Linz, Juan J; Stepan, Alfred; Yadav, Yogendra, eds. (2011). Crafting State-Nations: India and Other Multinational Democracies. Johns Hopkins University Press.

== Resources on Juan Linz and his research ==
- Chehabi, H.E. (ed.), Juan J. Linz: Scholar, Teacher, Friend. Cambridge, MA: Ty Aur Press, 2014.
- Darviche, Mohammad-Saïd, and William Genieys (eds.), Multinational State Building. Considering and Continuing the Work of Juan Linz. Montpellier: PÔLE SUD, 2008.
- Linz, Juan J., "Between Nations and Disciplines: Personal Experience and Intellectual Understanding of Societies and Political Regimes," pp. 101–14, in Hans Daalder (ed.), Comparative European Politics. The Story of a Profession. New York: Casell/Pinter, 1997.
- Linz, Juan J., "Totalitarianism and Authoritarianism: My Recollections on the Development of Comparative Politics," pp. 141–57, in Alfons Söllner et al, Totalitarismus. Berlin: Akademie Verlag, 1997.
- Linz, Juan J., Juan J. Linz. Obras Escogidas, eds. José Ramón Montero and Thomas Jeffrey Miley. Madrid: CEPC, 2008-2013. 7 Vols. [The collected works of Linz, in Spanish.]
  - Volumen 1. Fascismo: Perspectivas históricas y comparadas. Madrid: Centro de Estudios Políticos y Constitucionales, 2008.
  - Volumen 2. Nacion, Estado y lengua. Madrid: Centro de Estudios Políticos y Constitucionales, 2008.
  - Volumen 3. Regímenes totalitarios y autoritarios. Madrid: Centro de Estudios Políticos y Constitucionales, 2009.
  - Volumen 4. Democracias: quiebras, transiciones y retos. Madrid: Centro de Estudios Políticos y Constitucionales, 2009.
  - Volumen 5. Economía y empresarios en España. Madrid: Centro de Estudios Políticos y Constitucionales, 2013.
  - Volumen 6. Partidos y élites políticas en España. Madrid: Centro de Estudios Políticos y Constitucionales, 2013.
  - Volumen 7. Historia y sociedad en España. Madrid: Centro de Estudios Políticos y Constitucionales, 2013.
- Mainwaring, Scott, "Juan Linz and the Study of Latin American Politics," pp. 1–26, in Scott Mainwaring and Arturo Valenzuel (eds.), Politics, Society, and Democracy: Latin America. Boulder: Westview Press, 1998.
- Marcet, Joan, and José Ramón Montero (eds.), Roads to democracy: A tribute to Juan J. Linz. Barcelona, Institut de Ciències Polítiques i Socials, 2007.
- Munck, Gerardo L. and Richard Snyder, "Juan J. Linz: Political Regimes and the Quest for Knowledge," pp. 150–209, in Gerardo L. Munck and Richard Snyder, Passion, Craft, and Method in Comparative Politics. Baltimore, Md.: The Johns Hopkins University Press, 2007. [Interview with Juan Linz]
- Snyder, Richard, "Juan J. Linz: Regímenes Políticos, Democracia y la Búsqueda del Conocimiento," p. 549-603, in José Ramón Montero and Thomas Jeffrey Miley (eds.), Juan J. Linz: Obras Escogidas, Vol. 7, Historia y sociedad en España. Madrid: Centro de Estudios Políticos y Constitucionales, 2013.
- Snyder, Richard, "Retour sur les travaux de Juan Linz et leur reception. Extrait de l'entretien avec Juan J. Linz," Revue Internationale de Politique Comparée (France) 13(1)(2006): 129-41.

== See also ==
- Authoritarianism – Political system
- Robert Dahl – American political scientist (1915–2014)
- Seymour Martin Lipset – American sociologist (1922–2006)
- Guillermo O'Donnell – Argentine political scientist (1936–2011)
- Philippe C. Schmitter – American political scientist (born 1936)
- Arturo Valenzuela – Chilean-American academic (born 1944)
