= Guillermo O'Donnell =

Argentine political scientist (1936–2011)

- Born: Guillermo Alberto O'Donnell Ure; February 24, 1936; Buenos Aires, Argentina
- Died: November 29, 2011 (aged 75); Buenos Aires, Argentina

Academic background
- Education: University of Buenos Aires; Yale University
- Academic advisor: Robert A. Dahl
- Influences: Karl Marx; Max Weber; Robert Dahl; Philippe C. Schmitter

Academic work
- Discipline: Political science
- Sub-discipline: Political theory, Comparative politics
- Institutions: IUPERJ; University of Notre Dame; UNSAM
- Main interests: Democratization; Politics of South America; Authoritarianism
- Influenced: David Collier; Manuel Antonio Garretón; Gerardo Munck

Guillermo Alberto O'Donnell Ure (February 24, 1936 – November 29, 2011) was a prominent Argentine political scientist who specialized in comparative politics and Latin American politics. He spent most of his career working in Argentina and the United States, and who made lasting contributions to theorizing on authoritarianism and democratization, democracy and the state, and the politics of Latin America. His brother is Pacho O'Donnell.

== Biography ==
Guillermo Alberto O'Donnell Ure was born in Buenos Aires, Argentina to a family of Irish descent from County Donegal. He studied law at the University of Buenos Aires and became a lawyer in 1958, aged 22. He was involved in student politics, and was Secretary and Acting President of the Buenos Aires University Federation (FUBA), part of the Argentine University Federation, in 1954–1955. Later he served as national Vice-Minister of Interior (Political Affairs), in Argentina, in 1963. But he focused mainly on making a living by working as a lawyer and teaching. During these years he taught in the School of Law at the University of Buenos Aires (1958–66) and at the Pontifical Catholic University of Argentina (1966–68).

In 1968 O'Donnell left Argentina to pursue graduate studies in political science at Yale University. He earned his master's degree in political science in 1971, but rather than complete his dissertation and take a job offer from Harvard University, he returned to Buenos Aires. The text he started to work on at Yale was published as Modernization and Bureaucratic-Authoritarianism (1973), a book that immediately drew a lot of attention and led to a seminal debate about Latin American politics in David Collier's edited volume, The New Authoritarianism in Latin America (1979). But since this text was published, it could not be presented as a dissertation. And thus O'Donnell would not receive his Ph.D. in political science from Yale University until he presented a new dissertation and thus was awarded his Ph.D. belatedly, once he was an established scholar and professor, in 1987.

In Argentina, O'Donnell initially taught at the Universidad del Salvador (1972–75) and was a researcher at the Centro de Investigaciones en Administración Pública (CIAP), at the Torcuato di Tella Institute, between 1971 and 1975. Subsequently, O'Donnell was a founding member of CEDES (Centro de Estudios de Estado y Sociedad), where he worked from 1975 until 1979. During this period, Argentina was increasingly swept by violence, as guerrilla organizations such as the Montoneros sought to undermine the government and eventually the military rulers came to power in 1976 and launched a dirty war. In this climate, CEDES was one of the few research centers where critical thinking about politics thrived. Indeed, in 1978, O'Donnell launched a major research project on democratic transitions in Southern Europe and Latin America, which he co-directed with Philippe C. Schmitter, sponsored by the Latin American Program of the Woodrow Wilson International Center for Scholars, in Washington, D.C. The project began with three conferences, in 1979, 1980, and 1981, that gathered many of the world’s most distinguished scholars of democracy, including Robert A. Dahl, Juan Linz, Adam Przeworski, Fernando Henrique Cardoso, and Albert Otto Hirschman. It would result in a landmark publication: Transitions from Authoritarian Rule. Prospects for Democracy (1986).

In late 1979, O'Donnell left Argentina again, this time for Brazil. He worked as a researcher at IUPERJ (Instituto Universitário de Pesquisas do Rio de Janeiro) (1980–82) and then moved to the research center CEBRAP (Centro Brasileiro de Análise e Planejamento) in São Paulo in 1982, replacing sociologist Fernando Henrique Cardoso, who had become a national Senator. But O'Donnell moved again, now from Brazil to the United States, in 1983. Thereafter, though he maintained his affiliation with CEBRAP until 1991, he taught at the University of Notre Dame from 1983 until 2009, where he was Helen Kellogg Professor of Government and International Studies. He was also academic director of the Helen Kellogg Institute for International Studies of the University of Notre Dame from 1983 until 1997. His twenty-six year association with Notre Dame made this university the most important institutional home of O'Donnell's career.

During his career, O'Donnell played a leadership role in many professional associations. He served as president of the International Political Science Association (IPSA) from 1988 to 1991, and was vice-president of the American Political Science Association (APSA) in 1999–2000. He also held many short term appointment at universities around the world. He was a visiting professor at the University of Michigan in 1973-74; the Facultad Latinoamericana de Ciencias Sociales (FLASCO), in Buenos Aires, in 1978-79; the University of California, Berkeley, in 1982; the Centro de Estudios Avanzados en Ciencias Sociales, at the Instituto Juan March, in Madrid, in 1997; the University of Cambridge, where he was the Simon Bolivar Distinguished Visiting Professor in 2002-03; and the University of Oxford, where he was Senior Visiting Fellow in Politics at Nuffield College in 2003-04 and John G. Winant Visiting Professorship of American Government in 2007-08. He also was a Fellow at the Center for Advanced Study in the Behavioral Sciences (Stanford, California) in 2001-2002.

He bridged the worlds of academia and politics, working with the United Nations Development Programme (UNDP) during the 2000s, collaborating with Dante Caputo and Gerardo Munck in the preparation of the United Nations Development Programme’s report Democracy in Latin America. Toward a Citizens’ Democracy (2004), and a follow-up text, Democracia/Estado/Ciudadanía. Hacia un Estado de y para la democracia en América Latina (2008). O'Donnell also was a member of the Advisory Board of the United Nations Democracy Fund and a member of the scientific committee of Fundación IDEAS, Spain's Socialist Party's think-tank.

O'Donnell returned to his native Buenos Aires in 2009. There he continued to be active on the local academic scene. He joined the Escuela de Política y Gobierno, at the National University of General San Martín (Universidad Nacional de San Martín [UNSAM[), his last professional affiliation. At UNSAM O'Donnell founded the Centro de Investigaciones sobre el Estado y la Democracia en América Latina (CIEDAL), in 2010. In 2011, he was diagnosed with cancer and, after a four month battle, he died on November 29, 2011, at the age of 75. A public wake was held in the legislative building of the City of Buenos Aires, and his remains were buried in the Recoleta Cemetery.

He is survived by his wife, Gabriela Ippolito-O'Donnell, and his daughter, María O'Donnell.

== Honors and awards ==
- Title of "Ciudadano Ilustre de la Ciudad de Buenos Aires" (distinguished citizen of the City of Buenos Aires) (2007).
- First ever recipient of the Prize for Lifetime Achievement from the International Political Science Association (IPSA) (2006).
- Kalman Silvert Award for lifetime contribution to the study of Latin America, the highest honor of the Latin American Studies Association (LASA) (2003).
- Doctor Honoris Causa, National University of Rosario, Argentina (1999).
- "Premio Konex en Ciencias Políticas," Buenos Aires, Argentina (1996).
- Elected to the American Academy of Arts and Sciences (1995).
- The Latin American Studies Association created the Guillermo O'Donnell Democracy Award and Lectureship.

Various awards are named after O’Donnell:

- The International Political Science Association (IPSA) Guillermo O’Donnell Award for Latin-American Scholars
- The Guillermo O’Donnell Democracy Award and Lectureship of the Latin American Studies Association (LASA)

== Academic research ==
O’Donnell was a theorist of authoritarianism, democratization, and state capacity. He introduced several new concepts into political science, such as bureaucratic authoritarianism, horizontal accountability, delegative democracy, and brown areas. His best known work is Transitions from Authoritarian Rule: Tentative Conclusions about Uncertain Democracies (1986), with Philippe C. Schmitter.

=== Modernization and Bureaucratic Authoritarianism ===
O’Donnell’s Modernization and Bureaucratic Authoritarianism (1973) offered a pioneering analysis of the breakdown of democracies in South America in the 1960s. He argued that the form of authoritarianism experienced by South America starting in the 1960s was novel because it was based on modern technocrats and a professionalized military organization, instead of populist politicians or traditional military strongmen. To capture this distinctiveness, he coined the term 'bureaucratic authoritarianism'. The concept was applied in the literature to Brazil (1964-1985), Argentina (1966-1973, 1976-1983), Chile (1973-1990), and Uruguay (1973-1985).

O’Donnell argued that this new form of authoritarianism emerged as the result of political conflict generated by an import-substitution model of industrialization. He cast his argument as an alternative to the thesis, advanced most notably by Seymour Martin Lipset, that industrialization produced democracy. In South America, O’Donnell argued, industrialization generated not democracy, but bureaucratic authoritarianism. This work, along with a series of subsequent articles, triggered an important debate in comparative politics and Latin American Studies about the political consequences of economic development. The central contributions to this debate were published in a volume edited by David Collier, The New Authoritarianism in Latin America (1979), which assessed and critiqued O’Donnell’s thesis.

=== Transitions from Authoritarian Rule ===
The next phase of O’Donnell’s research focused on the demise of authoritarianism and transitions to democracy. His book, co-authored with Philippe Schmitter, Transitions from Authoritarian Rule: Tentative Conclusions about Uncertain Democracies (1986), was a widely-read and influential work in comparative politics during the 1980s and 1990s. O'Donnell and Schmitter proposed a strategic choice approach to transitions to democracy that highlighted how they were driven by the decisions of different actors in response to a core set of dilemmas. The analysis centered on the interaction among four actors: the hard-liners and soft-liners who belonged to the incumbent authoritarian regime, and the moderate and radical oppositions against the regime. This book not only became the point of reference for a burgeoning academic literature on democratic transitions, it was also read widely by political activists engaged in actual struggles to achieve democracy.

=== The quality of democracy and the state ===
O'Donnell's research since the early 1990s explored the question of the quality of democracy. His work warns against teleological thinking, that is, the tendency to see countries that democratized in the 1970s and 1980s as following in the tracks, though several steps behind, of the longstanding democratic countries of the West. To highlight the specificity of contemporary Latin American countries and the deficiencies of their democracies, he proposed the concept of delegative democracy, a form of democratic rule that concentrated power in the hands of elected presidents, and the associated concept of horizontal accountability. Later work centered on the problems faced by most Latin American democracies as a result of deficiencies in the rule of law and the social capabilities of citizens. His key works on the quality of democracy have been published in Counterpoints (1999), The Quality of Democracy (2004), Dissonances (2007), and in his final book, Democracy, Agency, and the State (2010), which makes a case for addressing the importance of the state in conceptualizations of democracy.

=== Reception ===
Summing up his contributions, one observer states that "O’Donnell decisively shaped the intellectual agenda for the study of the rise of military dictatorships in the Southern Cone in the early 1970s; pioneered the analysis of authoritarian breakdowns and democratic transitions throughout the 1980s; and broke new conceptual ground for efforts to understand the problems of life after transition (including the issue of institutional quality) during the 1990s." Another observer put it more succinctly: "Guillermo O’Donnell was the Argentine Max Weber".

== Selected publications ==
=== Books ===
- O’Donnell, Guillermo, Democracy, Agency and the State: Theory with Comparative Intent (Oxford University Press, 2010)
- O’Donnell, Guillermo, Dissonances: Democratic Critiques of Democracy (University of Notre Dame Press, 2007)
- O’Donnell, Guillermo, Jorge Vargas Cullell, and Osvaldo Iazzetta (eds.), The Quality of Democracy. Theory and Applications (University of Notre Dame Press, 2004).
- O’Donnell, Guillermo, Counterpoints: Selected Essays on Authoritarianism and Democratization (University of Notre Dame Press, 1999)
- The (Un)Rule of Law and the Underprivileged in Latin America (edited with Juan Méndez and Paulo Sérgio Pinheiro) (University of Notre Dame Press, 1999)
- Poverty and Inequality in Latin America (edited with Víctor Tokman) (University of Notre Dame Press, 1988)
- Issues in Democratic Consolidation (edited with Scott Mainwaring and J. Samuel Valenzuela) (University of Notre Dame Press, 1992)
- Transitions from Authoritarian Rule.Tentative Conclusions about Uncertain Democracies (with Philippe Schmitter) (Johns Hopkins University Press, 1986)
- Transitions from Authoritarian Rule. Prospects for Democracy 4 Vols. (edited with Philippe Schmitter and Laurence Whitehead) (Johns Hopkins University Press, 1986)
- Development and the Art of Trespassing (edited with Alejandro Foxley and Michael S. McPherson) (University of Notre Dame Press, 1986)
- O’Donnell, Guillermo, 1966-1973. El Estado burocrático autoritario. Triunfos, derrotas y crisis (Buenos Aires: Editorial Belgrano, 1982) [English version: Bureaucratic Authoritarianism: Argentina 1966-1973 in Comparative Perspective (University of California Press, 1988).]
- O’Donnell, Guillermo, Modernization and Bureaucratic-Authoritarianism: Studies in South American Politics (Institute of International Studies, University of California, 1973)

=== Articles and chapters ===
- O’Donnell, Guillermo, “Nuevas reflexiones acerca de la democracia delegativa,” pp. 19–32, in Guillermo O’Donnell, Osvaldo Iazzetta, and Hugo Quiroga (eds.), Democracia delegativa (Buenos Aires: Prometeo Editorial, 2011).
- O’Donnell, Guillermo, "Hacia un Estado de y para la democracia,” pp. 25–62, in Programa de Naciones Unidas para el Desarrollo (PNUD), Democracia/Estado/Ciudadanía. Hacia un Estado de y para la democracia en América Latina (New York: PNUD, 2008).
- O’Donnell, Guillermo, “Human Development, Human Rights, and Democracy” pp. 9–92, in Guillermo O’Donnell, Jorge Vargas Cullell, and Osvaldo Iazzetta (eds.), The Quality of Democracy. Theory and Applications (University of Notre Dame Press, 2004).
- O’Donnell, Guillermo, “Why the Rule of Law Matters”, Journal of Democracy 15, 4 (2004): 32-46.
- O’Donnell, Guillermo, “Democracy, Law, and Comparative Politics”, Studies in Comparative International Development Vol. 36, Nº 1 (2001): 7-36.
- O’Donnell, Guillermo, “Horizontal Accountability in New Polyarchies,” Journal of Democracy Vol. 9, Nº 3 (1998): 112-26.
- O’Donnell, Guillermo, “Illusions about Consolidation,” Journal of Democracy Vol. 7, Nº 2 (1996): 34-51.
- O’Donnell, Guillermo, “Delegative Democracy,” Journal of Democracy Vol. 5, Nº 1 (1994): 55-69.
- O’Donnell, Guillermo, “On the State, Democratization and Some Conceptual Problems (A Latin American View with Glances at Some Post-Communist Countries),” World Development Vol. 21, Nº 8 (1993): 1355-70.
- O’Donnell, Guillermo, “Notas para el estudio de procesos de democratización política a partir del Estado Burocrático-Autoritario,” Desarrollo Económico Vol. 22, Nº 86 (1982): 231-47. [English version: “Notes for the Study of Processes of Political Democratization in the Wake of the Bureaucratic-Authoritarian State”, pp. 109–29, in Guillermo O’Donnell, Counterpoints: Selected Essays on Authoritarianism and Democratization (University of Notre Dame Press, 1999).]
- O’Donnell, Guillermo, “Tensions in the Bureaucratic-Authoritarian State and the Question of Democracy,” pp. 285–318, in David Collier (ed.), The New Authoritarianism in Latin America (Princeton University Press, 1979).
- O’Donnell, Guillermo, “State and Alliances in Argentina, 1956-1976”, Journal of Development Studies Vol. 15, Nº 1 (1978): 3-33.
- O’Donnell, Guillermo, “Modernización y golpes militares: teoría, comparación y el caso argentino,” Desarrollo Económico Vol. 12, Nº 47 (1972): 519-66. [English version: “Modernization and Military Coups: Theory, Comparisons, and the Argentine Case,” pp. 197–43, in Abraham Lowenthal (ed.), Armies and Politics in Latin America (Holmes and Meier, 1976)]

== Works on O'Donnell and his research ==
External videos
- Presentation by O'Donnell on democracy - at the Facultad de Ciencias Sociales-UBA, 1999 (in Spanish).
- Presentation by O'Donnell on democracy - at the Sociedad Argentina de Análisis Político (SAAP) and Fundación OSDE, June 23, 2009 (in Spanish).

- Brinks, Daniel, Marcelo Leiras, and Scott Mainwaring (eds.), Reflections on Uneven Democracies: The Legacy of Guillermo O’Donnell. Baltimore, Maryland: Johns Hopkins University Press, 2014.
- Bulcourf, Pablo, "El arte de nombrar: Guillermo O’Donnell y el desarrollo de la ciencia política en América latina," Temas y debates (2012). Archived 2016-03-04 at the Wayback Machine
- Bulcourf, Pablo, and Gustavo Dufour. "Guillermo O'Donnell and his contribution to the development of political science in Latin America." Dados Vol: 55, Issue: 1 (2011): 5-35.
- Bulcourf, Pablo, and Augusto Reina, "Comprendiendo al Estado: Los aportes de Guillermo O'Donnell a su reconceptualización en América Latina," Revista de Ciencia Política y Relaciones Internacionales (2009). Archived 2016-03-03 at the Wayback Machine
- Collier, David (ed.), The New Authoritarianism in Latin America (Princeton University Press, 1979).
- Collier, David "Bureaucratic Authoritarianism," pp. 93–95, in Joel Krieger (ed.), The Oxford Companion to Politics of the World, 2nd Edition. Oxford: Oxford University Press, 2001.
- Guilhot, Nicolas, The Democracy Makers: Human Rights and the Politics of Global Order (Columbia University Press, 2005), Chapters 3 and 4.
- Lehmann, David, Democracy and Development in Latin America: Economics, Politics and Religion in the Post-War Period (Temple University Press, 1990), Chapter 2.
- Lehmann, David, "A Latin American Political Scientist: Guillermo O'Donnell," Latin American Research Review Vol. 24, Nº 2 (1989): 187-200.
- Munck, Gerardo L., “Democratic Theory After Transitions From Authoritarian Rule,” Perspectives on Politics Vol. 9, Nº 2 (2011): 333-43.
- Munck, Gerardo L., and Richard Snyder, Passion, Craft, and Method in Comparative Politics (Johns Hopkins University Press, 2007). [Interview with Guillermo O'Donnell: "Democratization, Political Engagement and Agenda Setting Research."]
- Toppi, Hernán Pablo, "Guillermo O’Donnell y su aporte al desarrollo de la democracia en América Latina desde la tercera ola de democratización." Revista IUS vol. 12, núm. 42 (2018): 09-28.

== See also ==
- Transitology – The study of changes, usually to democracy
- Julio Cotler – Peruvian anthropologist, sociologist and political scientist (1932–2019)
- Alfred Stepan – American political scientist (1936–2017)
