= Transitology =

The study of changes, usually to democracy

In political science and in international and comparative law and economics, transitology is the study of the process of change from one political regime to another, mainly from authoritarian regimes to democratic ones rooted in conflicting and consensual varieties of economic liberalism.

Transitology tries to explain processes of democratization in a variety of contexts, from bureaucratic authoritarianism and other forms of dictatorship in Latin America, southern Europe and northern Africa to postcommunist developments in eastern Europe. The debate has become something of an academic "turf-war" between comparative studies and area studies scholars, while highlighting several problematic features of social science methodology, including generalization, an overemphasis on elite attitudes and behavior, Eurocentrism, the role of history in explaining causality, and the inability to produce testable hypotheses.

Transitology explains the different pathways to and from democracy as explained in the Massive Open Online Course MOOC on Transitology set up by Anja Mihr and launched by the Global Campus for Human Rights . In this training course Transitology is explained as a concept and analytical framework applied in political and social science to analyse political regime change in either ways, democratic or autocratic. Successful democratic transition, is one pathway how democratic institutions slowly consolidate and strengthen over time. Transitology also explains why weak and corrupted democratic institutions fail and backslide into authoritarian political practices and, subsequently, autocracies.

== Notable academics ==
- Dankwart Rustow, father of the theory of transitology, former Columbia University professor, and professor for 25 years at the City University of New York.
- Philippe C. Schmitter, a key proposes on transitology and author of Transitions from Authoritarian Rule: Tentative Conclusions About Uncertain Democracies (1986) with Guillermo O'Donnell.
- Joseph Stiglitz, Nobel Prize–winning economist and professor of economics at Columbia University.
- Jeffrey Sachs, Director of the Earth Institute, Columbia University.
- Katharina Pistor, Professor of Law, Columbia University.
- Seymour Martin Lipset, While Lipset did not study transitology directly, his theories on the role of economic development in the survival of democracy, first articulated in "Some Social Requisites of Democracy: Economic Development and Political Legitimacy, has been influential in the field.
- Larry Diamond, political science professor at Stanford University, has been significant in the development of the concept of illiberal democracy and its role in democratic transitions.
- Thomas Carothers, also significant in the development of the concept of illiberal democracy and articulating the distinction between a consolidating democracy and an illiberal democracy.
