= Philippe Schmitter =

American political scientist (born 1936)

Philippe C. Schmitter
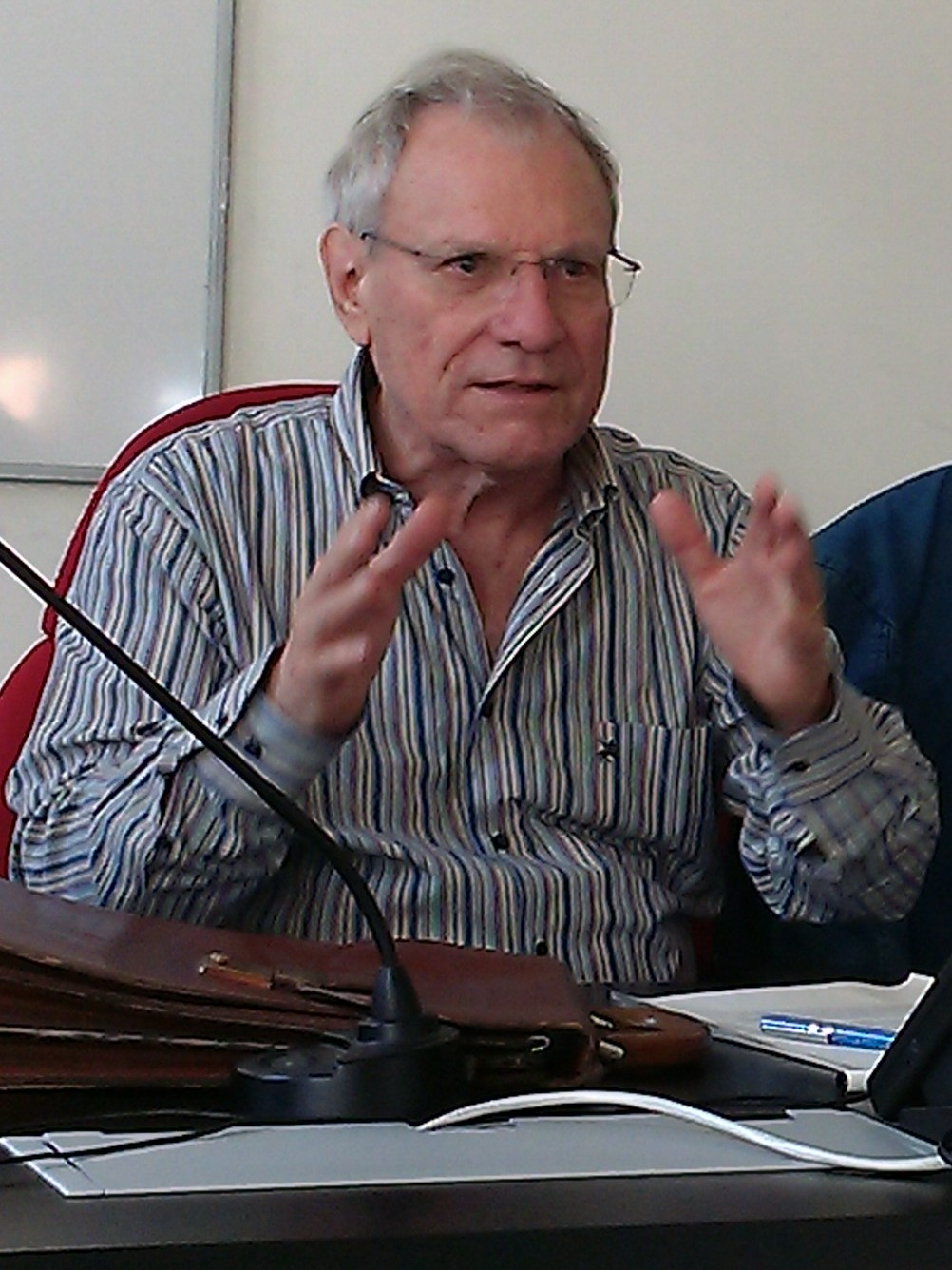
- Born: November 19, 1936 (age 89); Washington, D.C.
- Awards: Johan Skytte Prize (2009)

Academic background
- Education: Dartmouth College (BA); Geneva Graduate Institute (Lic); University of California, Berkeley (PhD)
- Doctoral advisor: Ernst B. Haas
- Other advisors: David E. Apter; Seymour M. Lipset
- Influences: Guillermo O'Donnell

Academic work
- Discipline: Political science
- Sub-discipline: Comparative politics; Political theory
- Institutions: Universidade do Brasil; University of Chicago; European University Institute; Stanford University
- Doctoral students: David Collier, Michael Goldfield
- Main interests: Democratization; Politics of South America; Corporatism

Philippe C. Schmitter (born November 19, 1936) is an American political scientist specializing in comparative politics. He is Emeritus Professor of the Department of Political and Social Sciences at the European University Institute.

== Career ==
Schmitter has a B.A. from Dartmouth College in 1957, a licence from the Geneva Graduate Institute in Switzerland and a Ph.D. in political science from the University of California, Berkeley in 1967.

When he was working on his dissertation on “Development and Interest Politics in Brazil from 1930–1965", he went to Rio de Janeiro in 1965 to teach at the Instituto de Ciências Socias da Universidade do Brasil, as part of initiative closely tied to the Alliance for Progress.

Since 1967 he has been successively assistant professor, associate professor and professor in the Politics Department of the University of Chicago (1967–82), then at the European University Institute (1982–86 and 1997–2005) and at Stanford (1986–96). In 1996 he returned to the European University Institute, where he retired in 2004.

== Awards ==
In 2009, Schmitter won the Johan Skytte Prize in Political Science for his "path-breaking work on the role of corporatism in modern democracies, and for his stimulating and innovative analysis of democratization". He also received the ECPR Lifetime Achievement Award by the European Consortium for Political Research in 2007, the EUSA Award for Lifetime Achievement in European Studies by the European Union Studies Association in 2009, and the Mattei Dogan Prize awarded by the International Political Science Association (IPSA) to a scholar of high international reputation in recognition of their contribution to political science in 2009.

== Academic research ==
Schmitter has published widely on comparative politics, European and Latin America regional integration, transitions from authoritarian rule and democratization processes, and the intermediation of class, sectoral and professional interests. More recently he has been examining the possibilities for post-liberal democracy in North America and Europe.

=== Corporatism ===
In "Still the Century of Corporatism?" (1974), Schmitter reintroduced the concept of corporatism to political science and distinguished between two types of corporatism: societal or liberal, corporatism, and the state or authoritarian corporatism. This work challenged pluralist theory. As described by Ming-sho Ho, societal, or liberal, corporatism, "is a form of economic tripartitism rooted in a “social partnership” between capital and labor so that public intervention in the market economy can be facilitated for stability and growth." In contrast, the state or authoritarian corporatism "emanates from the attempts for control by nondemocratic rulers and results in the creation of dominated and dependent interest associations."

=== Democratization ===
Schmitter's main work on democratization is Transitions from Authoritarian Rule: Tentative Conclusions About Uncertain Democracies (1986), with Guillermo O'Donnell. This book was one of the most widely read and influential works in comparative politics during the 1980s and 1990s. O’Donnell and Schmitter proposed a strategic choice approach to transitions to democracy that highlighted how they were driven by the decisions of different actors in response to a core set of dilemmas. The analysis centered on the interaction among four actors: the hard-liners and soft-liners who belonged to the incumbent authoritarian regime, and the moderate and radical oppositions against the regime. This book not only became the point of reference for a burgeoning academic literature on democratic transitions, it was also read widely by political activists engaged in actual struggles to achieve democracy.

== Selected publications ==
=== In comparative politics ===
- Schmitter, Philippe C. 1971. Interest Conflict and Political Change in Brazil. Stanford: Stanford University Press.
- Schmitter, Philippe C. 1974. “Still the Century of Corporatism?" The Review of Politics 36(1): 85–131.
- Schmitter, Philippe C. 1978. "Reflections on Mihaïl Manoilescu and the Political Consequences of Delayed- Dependent Development on the Periphery of Western Europe," pp. 117–139, in K. Jowitt (ed.), Social Change in Romania 1860-1940. Berkeley: Institute of International Studies.
- Schmitter, Philippe C., and Gerhard Lehmbruch (eds.). 1981. Trends Toward Corporatist Intermediation. London: Sage Publications.
- Lehmbruch, Gerhard, and Philippe C. Schmitter. 1982. Patterns of Corporatist Policy-Making. London: Sage Publications.
- Streeck, Wolfgang, and Philippe C. Schmitter. 1985. "Community, market, state—and associations? The prospective contribution of interest governance to social order". European Sociological Review Volume 1, Issue 2: 119–138.
- Schmitter, Philippe C., and Guillermo O'Donnell. 1986. Transitions from Authoritarian Rule: Tentative Conclusions About Uncertain Democracies Baltimore: Johns Hopkins University Press.
- Schmitter, Philippe C., Guillermo O'Donnell, and Laurence Whitehead (eds.). 1986. Transitions from Authoritarian Rule. Prospects for Democracy 4 Vols. Baltimore: Johns Hopkins University Press.
- Schmitter, Philippe C., and Terry Lynn Karl. 1991. “What Democracy Is. . . and Is Not.” Journal of Democracy 2(3): 75–88.
- Terry Lynn Karl, and Philippe C. Schmitter. 1991. "Modes of Transition in Latin America, Southern and Eastern Europe." International Social Science Journal No. 128 (May): 269–284.
- Schmitter, Philippe C. 1992. "The Consolidation of Democracy and Representation of Social Groups." American Behavioral Scientist Vol. 35, Nos. 4–5: 422–449.
- Schmitter, Philippe C. 1995. “The Consolidation of Political Democracies,” pp. 535–570, in Geoffrey Pridham (ed.), Transitions to Democracy. Aldershot: Dartmouth.
- Marks, Gary, Fritz W. Scharpf, Philippe C. Schmitter, and Wolfgang Streeck. 1996. Governance in the European Union. London: Sage.
- Schmitter, Philippe C. 1999. Portugal: do autoritarismo à democracia. Lisboa: Imprensa de Ciências Sociais.
- Schmitter, Philippe C. 2000. How to Democratize the European Union ....and Why Bother? Boulder: Rowman & Littlefield.
- Schmitter, Philippe C., and Marc Blecher. 2021. Politics as a Science: A Prolegomenon. London: Routledge.

=== On the field of comparative politics ===
- Schmitter, Philippe C. 1993. "Comparative Politics," pp. 171–177, in Joel Krieger (ed.), The Oxford Companion to Politics of the World. New York/Oxford: Oxford University Press.
- Schmitter, Philippe C. 2002. "Seven (disputable) theses concerning the future of 'transatlanticised' or 'globalised' political science". European Political Science 1: 23–40.
- Schmitter, Philippe C. 2009. “The Nature and Future of Comparative Politics.” European Political Science Review 1(01): 33–61.
- Schmitter, Philippe C. 2016. "Comparative Politics: its Past, Present and Future." Chinese Political Science Review volume 1: 397–411.
- Schmitter, Philippe C., and Marc Blecher. 2021. Politics as a Science: A Prolegomenon. London: Routledge.

== Resources on Philippe Schmitter and his research ==
External videos
- Presentation by Schmitter on "The Future of Real Existing Democracy" - at ISES and UNESCO, Nov. 9, 2015
- Presentation by Schmitter on "Real-Existing Democracy and its Discontent" - iASK Lecture Series, April 24, 2018S

- Colin Crouch and Wolfgang Streeck (eds.). 2006. The Diversity of Democracy: Corporatism, Social Order and Political Conflict. Cheltenham: Edward Elgar.
- James N. Green. 2002. "Interview with Philippe Schmitter". San Francisco, tape December 18, 2002
- Munck, Gerardo L. and Richard Snyder. 2007. "Corporatism, Democracy, and Conceptual Traveling,” pp. 305–350, in Gerardo L. Munck and Richard Snyder, Passion, Craft, and Method in Comparative Politics. Baltimore, Md.: The Johns Hopkins University Press. [Interview with Philippe Schmitter.]
- Schmitter, Philippe C. 1997. “Autobiographical Reflections: or how to live with a conceptual albatross around one’s neck,” pp. 287–297, in Hans Daalder (ed.), Comparative European Politics. The Story of a Profession. New York: Casell/Pinter.

== See also ==
- Democracy – Government system where political power lies with the people
- Democratization – Society becoming more democratic
- Latin American studies – Academic interdisciplinary field
- Transitology – The study of changes, usually to democracy
- David Collier – American political scientist (born 1942)
- Gerhard Lehmbruch – German political scientist (1928–2022)
- Juan Linz – Spanish sociologist and political scientist (1926–2013)
- Claus Offe – German political sociologist (1940–2025)
- Adam Przeworski – Polish-American political scientist (born 1940)
- Wolfgang Streeck – German economic sociologist (born 1946)
