= Lilian Harrison =

Argentine swimmer

Lilian Gemma Harrison
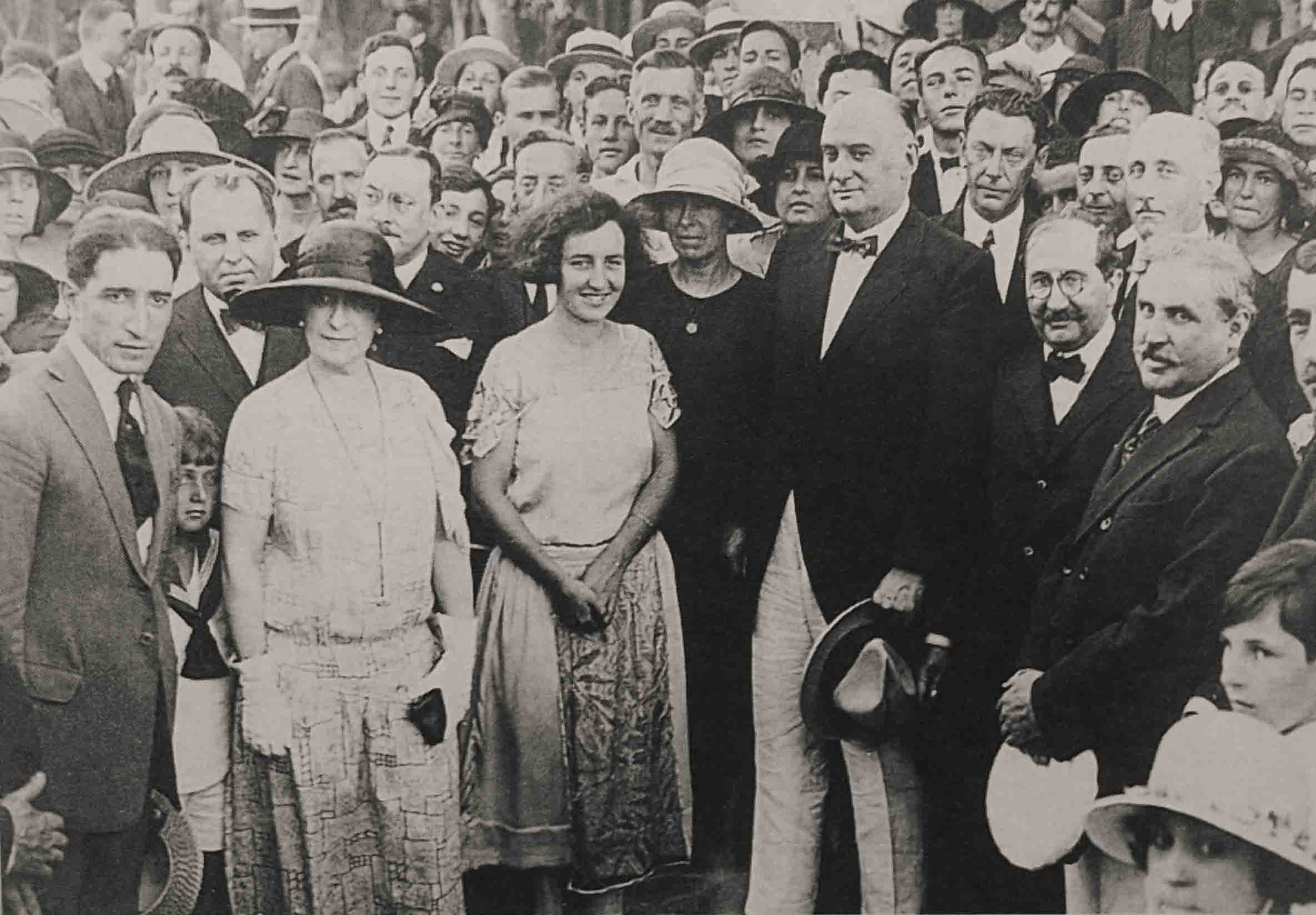
- Lilian Harrison with president of Argentina Marcelo Torcuato de Alvear.

Personal information
- Full name: Lilian Gemma Harrison
- Born: 8 February 1904 Quilmes, Argentina
- Died: 11 January 1993 (aged 88) Olivos, Argentina

Sport
- Sport: Swimming

Lilian Gemma Harrison (8 February 1904 – 11 January 1993) was an Argentine marathon swimmer, the first person to swim across the River Plate, the widest river in the world, on 22 December 1923; and a holder of the world record of endurance in the water. She was a pioneer of swimming in South America.

== Biography ==
Lilian Harrison was born in Quilmes, is a city in the province of Buenos Aires, Argentina, in 1904, within a family of British immigrants. As a child, when she has 8 years old, she went to England to attend school at Hertfordshire, where she learnt to swim. She returned to Argentina in 1920, when she was 16 years old, and started to swim in the Club Náutico San Isidro, where she was coached by Gunther Weber, with whom she started to prepare for a crossing of the River Plate. She was assisted in her training by Vito Dumas, Romero Maciel and Enrique Tirabocchi, among others.

== World record ==
Her first big endurance test was the 67 kilometer (41.2 miles) Zárate-Tigre raid, down the Paraná River, on February 4, 1923. Completing this swim, she established a world female record of permanence in the water of 21 hours and 20 minutes.

== First crossing of the River Plate ==
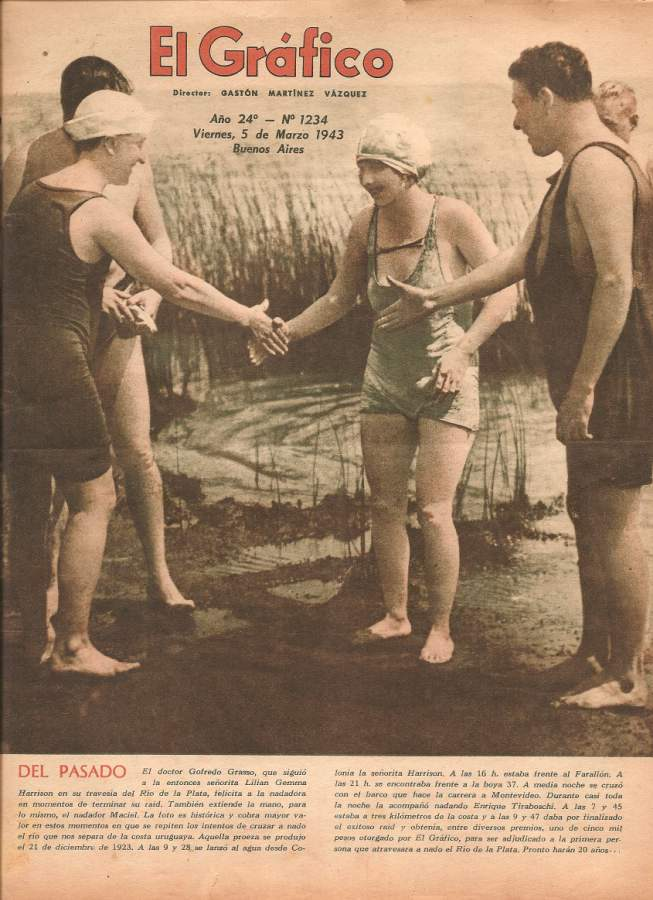
Lilian Harrison, arriving at Punta Lara, on December 22, 1923; Cover of El Gráfico.

In 1923 she embarked on the crossing of the River Plate. Until then, nine attempts to cross the River Plate had been made. But these attempts, by swimmers Enrique Tirabocchi, Luis Garramendy, Elio Pérez, Romero Maciel and Vito Dumas, had failed. Of these, Dumas had been the one who resisted longest in the water (25 hours and 17 minutes), while Maciel was the swimmer who covered the longest distance, abandoning his attempt when he was only 3 kilometers (1.9 miles) short of his point of destination.

Harrison started her crossing on 21 December 1923, from the port of Colonia, in Uruguay, at 9:28 in the morning. During the first stretch, she was accompanied by Uruguayan swimmers Caracciolo and Graneri, and had to struggle during three hours against the current pushing them back toward the Uruguayan coast. Then she headed toward the south, accompanied by Tiraboschi and Wernotri.

At 15:30 she drank some orange juice, at 17 a coffee, and at 18:30 a lump of sugar. As night fell, her team realised that they had not brought reflectors, an error that could have boomed the crossing but that was partially compensated by the moon light,

From 1 o'clock until 4 a.m. she swam alone. At 4:30 the argentine coast was seen from the boats that were accompanying her. At that moment she was about to abandon, given that she was exhausted. But she managed to continue when she was told that she was 5 kilometers (3.1 miles) away from her goal.

She touched shore on the argentine side of the River Plate at 9:47 in the morning, on the Playa Colorada, close to the Punta Lara. She had covered 48 kilometers (29.8 miles) in 24 hours and 19 minutes.

== The English Channel ==
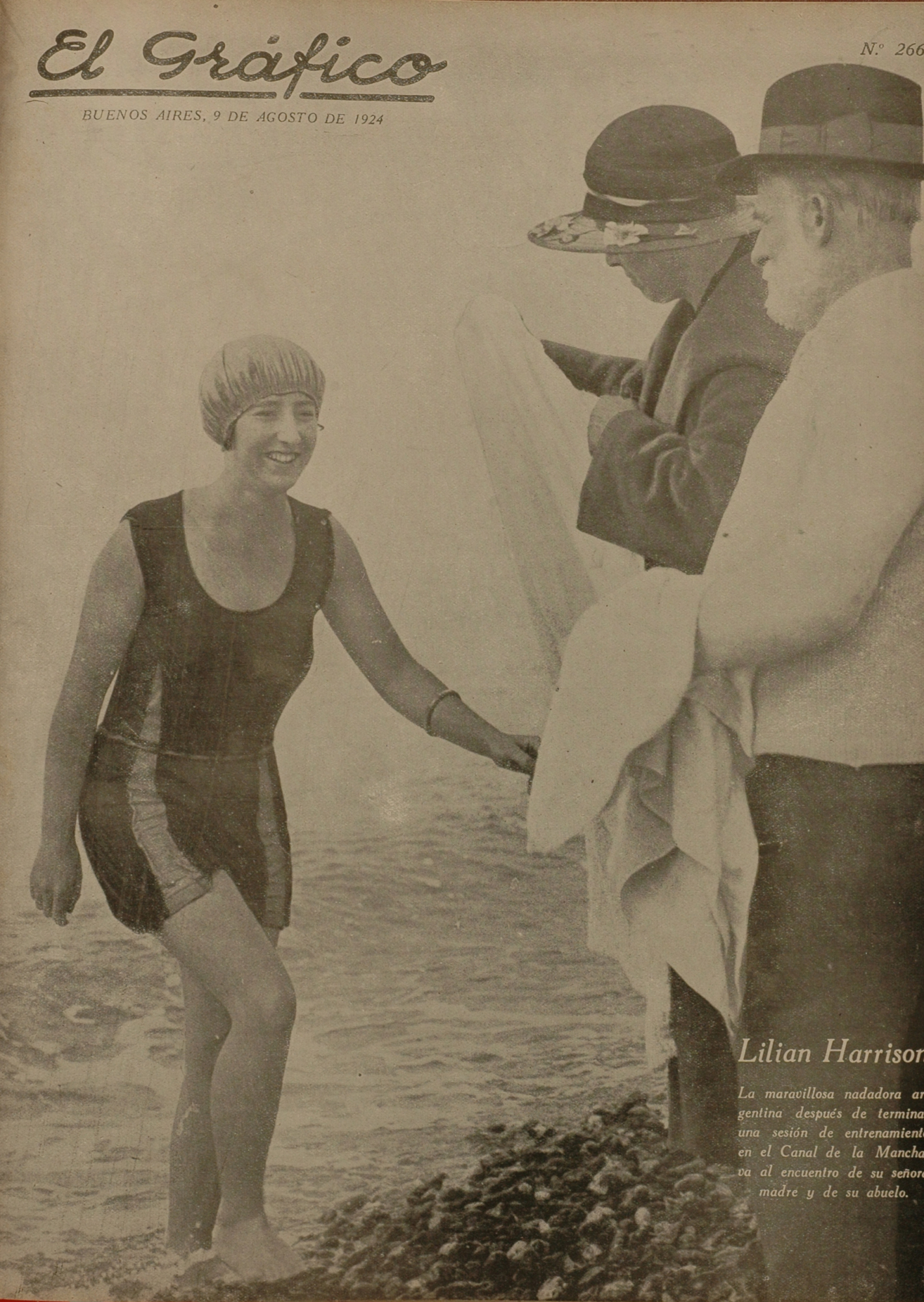
Harrison entering the English Channel, 1924.

In 1924, she attempted to cross the English Channel four times, without achieving her goal. On the last of these attempts, she was close to drowning.

== The Seine River ==
On 1 August 1925, she participated in the 42K (26-mile) marathon of the City of Paris, a competition on the Seine River. Lilian Harrison was the only woman among the twelve swimmers, ending in fourth place.

== Private life ==
In 1926 she married and abandoned high performance swimming. She had one daughter, Sheila Clark and six grandsons and granddaughters. Her grandsons include Ronaldo Munck, a well-known sociologist living in Ireland and Gerardo Munck, a political scientist living in the United States.

== Prizes and honors ==
For her crossing of the River Plate, she was decorated by the Minister of navy, in the presence of the president of Argentina Marcelo Torcuato de Alvear and the first lady; and honored by the Governor of the province of Buenos Aires, José Luis Cantilo, during a celebration in Quilmes, her native city.

For her crossing of the River Plate she also received a prize of 5,000 pesos that the sport magazine El Gráfico had established for the first person to cross the River Plate.

For her career in marathon swimming, she was inducted to the "International Marathon Swimming Hall of Fame" in 1973.

== 90 years until a second crossing of the River Plate by a woman ==
Lilian Harrison's feat of crossing the River Plate in 1923 was only repeated by a woman 90 years later, when Noelia Petti became the second woman to swim across the River Plate, from Colonia to Punta Lara, on March 9, 2014.

== Swimming and art ==
Lilian Harrison's crossing the River Plate was remembered in the award winning work Crol, a theater recital by Verónica Schneck that premiered in 2015.
