= Gerhard Lehmbruch =

German political scientist (1928–2022)

Gerhard Lehmbruch (15 April 1928, Königsberg – 12 June 2022) was a member of the University of Konstanz. Lehmbruch received a doctorate and a Habilitation in Political Science from the University of Tübingen. Thereafter, he was professor at the universities of Heidelberg, Tübingen and Konstanz, from 1969 to 1996.

Lehmbruch was Vice-president of the International Political Science Association (1988-91) and president of the German Political Science Association (1991-1994).

His research focused on German and comparative politics. He is a prominent researcher of liberal corporatism. He collaborated with Philippe C. Schmitter in his research on neo-corporatism.

Lehmbruch was awarded the ECPR Lifetime Achievement Award by the European Consortium for Political Research in 2009. He also received the Theodor-Eschenburg-Prize for his lifetime achievements of the German Political Science Association in 2003.

== Selected publications ==
- Lehmbruch, Gerhard. 1977. "Liberal Corporatism and Party Government." Comparative Political Studies 10(1): 91-126.
- Schmitter, Philippe C., and Gerhard Lehmbruch (eds.). 1981. Trends Toward Corporatist Intermediation. London: Sage Publications.
- Lehmbruch, Gerhard, and Philippe C. Schmitter. 1982. Patterns of Corporatist Policy-Making. London: Sage Publications.
