= David Collier (political scientist) =

American political scientist (born 1942)

- Born: February 17, 1942 (age 84); Chicago, Illinois, U.S.
- Education: Harvard University (BA); University of Chicago (MA, PhD)
- Occupation: Political scientist
- Awards: Johan Skytte Prize in Political Science (2014)
- Scientific career
- Workplaces: University of California, Berkeley
- Doctoral advisor: Philippe C. Schmitter

David Collier (born February 17, 1942) is an American political scientist specializing in comparative politics. He is Chancellor's Professor Emeritus at the University of California, Berkeley. He works in the fields of comparative politics, Latin American politics, and methodology. His father was the anthropologist Donald Collier.

== Biography ==
Collier was born in Chicago, Illinois in 1942. He obtained a B.A. degree from Harvard University in 1965, and received a Ph.D. in political science from the University of Chicago in 1971.

After receiving his doctorate, Collier taught at Indiana University, Bloomington, where he was promoted from Assistant to associate professor in 1975. He joined the Political Science Department at Berkeley in 1978. At Berkeley, Collier has been Chair of the Political Science Department and of the center for Latin American Studies, and he was founding co-director of the Berkeley-Stanford Program in Latin American Studies. At Berkeley he was centrally involved in training scholars in the fields of Latin American politics, comparative politics, and methodology, and he won Berkeley's campus-wide Distinguished Faculty Mentor Award.

Collier has served as President of the Comparative Politics Section, American Political Science Association (APSA); has been a Vice President of APSA; and was the founding President of the APSA Organized Section for Qualitative and Multi-Method Research. Collier has played an active role in building the Institute for Qualitative and Multi-Method Research (IQMR), an international training program held annually at Syracuse University.

Collier received a Guggenheim Fellowship and was a Fellow at the Center for Advanced Study in the Behavioral Sciences.

== Awards and honors ==
- 1993 Collier's book Shaping the Political Arena (1991) won the Best Book Prize of the APSA Comparative Politics Section.
- 2004 Member of the American Academy of Arts and Sciences.
- 2011 Elected Fellow of the American Association for the Advancement of Science.
- 2013 Powell Award for Graduate Student Mentoring, APSA Comparative Politics Section
- 2014 Johan Skytte Prize in Political Science
- 2014 Frank J. Goodnow Award for Distinguished Service to Political Science and the American Political Science Association.

The "David Collier Mid-Career Achievement Award," of the APSA Organized Section for Qualitative and Multi-Method Research, was named after Collier in 2010.

== Academic research ==
Collier was initially known for his work on Latin American politics. In the second half of his career, he focused on methodology. Following his retirement from teaching, he returned to the topic of critical junctures and co-edited Critical Junctures and Historical Legacies: Insights and Methods for Comparative Social Science (2022).

=== Comparative politics and Latin America ===
A first strand of Collier's work focuses on Latin American politics and the broader field of comparative politics. This early work includes quantitative cross-national research on political regimes, corporatism, and social policy, as well as an exploration of the links between regime change and public policy toward squatter settlements in Peru, which was published as Squatters and Oligarchs: Authoritarian Rule and Policy Change in Peru (1976). His two major works on Latin American politics are his edited volume The New Authoritarianism in Latin America (1979), and his coauthored Shaping the Political Arena: Critical Junctures, the Labor Movement, and Regime Dynamics in Latin America (1991).

==== The New Authoritarianism in Latin America ====
In The New Authoritarianism in Latin America (1979), Collier—together with leading scholars in the field, such as Guillermo O'Donnell, Albert O. Hirschman, and Fernando Henrique Cardoso—explore alternative explanations for the rise of authoritarianism in Latin America in the 1960s and 1970s. This work brought the literature on Latin American politics in dialogue with the modernization theory dominant in comparative politics at the time. Focusing on the fact that the most industrialized Latin American countries were not the more democratic ones, it articulated several critiques of the prevailing view of Third World politics put forth by modernization theorists (e.g., Seymour Martin Lipset). Thus, at a time when comparative politics sought to provide a general theory of politics in a way that largely disregarded insights developed by regional experts, Collier's New Authoritarianism provided an alternative, demonstrating that area studies could be a site of creative theorizing. Consequently, The New Authoritarianism in Latin America was a landmark study in the literature on national political regimes and in the study of politics in Latin America, and it was translated into both Spanish and Portuguese

==== Shaping the Political Arena ====
Collier's most sweeping work on Latin America, the fruit of over a decade of research, is Shaping the Political Arena: Critical Junctures, the Labor Movement, and Regime Dynamics in Latin America (1991), coauthored with Ruth Berins Collier. This major work makes two fundamental theoretical contributions. The first concerns the linked ideas of (a) critical junctures, periods of crucial change in the history of given countries or other political units that are hypothesized to leave distinctive legacies, and (b) path dependence, the trajectories of change stemming from and constrained by critical junctures. These were, in one sense, not new ideas. The distinctive contribution of Shaping the Political Arena was to turn these ideas into a carefully formulated model directly relevant to research in comparative politics; and to then offer a magisterial application of this model to Latin American cases. This book was the first, and still remains, one of the most systematic formulations and applications of critical junctures and path dependency. It convincingly dispelled whatever doubts may have existed about the potentially decisive effect historical events and turning points could have on key political outcomes, from political regimes to democracy to party systems. The lasting effect of Collier's contribution is evident in many ways. Collier inspired other researchers in the field of comparative politics (e.g., Kathleen Thelen, Paul Pierson, Deborah J. Yashar, and James Mahoney) to fine-tune and further develop the model presented in Shaping the Political Arena. Moreover, the applications that draw on Collier's core ideas about critical junctures and path dependence go beyond political science to economics.

The second theoretical contribution of Shaping the Political Arena concerns Latin American politics. In this regard, Shaping the Political Arena showed how the way in which labor was incorporated into national political institutions had a major and enduring effect on the subsequent evolution of a country's party system and political regimes. Counterintuitively, where the role of labor was greater and where it participated more, the resulting political regime was more stable. This argument was examined through an ambitious comparative historical analysis of eight countries over a period of five decades that relied on four paired comparisons. One of the most controversial pairings was Brazil and Chile; this pairing was questioned by many Latin Americanists and experts on labor in Latin America. In retrospect, however, this choice has been vindicated. Nowadays it has become commonplace to see Brazil and Chile as exemplifying a common trajectory with regard to political and economic development. In brief, Shaping the Political Arena makes a major theoretical contribution through its elaboration of a critical juncture and path dependency model and also stands as the most ambitious and systematic work on Latin America in the tradition of comparative-historical analysis.

=== Methodology ===
A second strand of Collier's work focuses on methodology, an area in which Collier has focused attention on setting standards for rigorous qualitative research, as well as multi-method work that combines qualitative and quantitative methods. Collier's key publications on methodology are the co-edited Rethinking Social Inquiry: Diverse Tools, Shared Standards (2004/2010) and The Oxford Handbook of Political Methodology (2008).

==== Concepts and typologies ====
One major contribution concerns the centrality of concepts in political science research and the methodological issues of concept formation and conceptual change. Extending the tradition of Giovanni Sartori, Collier makes distinctive, original contributions. In his widely cited "Democracy with Adjectives" (coauthored, World Politics 1997), Collier shows how the analysis of concepts can help bring order to research characterized by great conceptual innovation, but perhaps not surprisingly also conceptual disorder. In particular, he shows how the explicit disaggregation of this concept and attention to its internal structure clarifies alternative meanings, and thereby contributes incisively to producing and accumulating knowledge.

Collier has also made an important contribution to political science by refocusing attention on typologies. Collier shows that typologies, when used carefully and systematically, can help form the key concepts in substantive research and are also an essential tool for theorizing. Moreover, in various publications, Collier has shown how decisions regarding conceptualization affect measurement, and he has offered guidelines regarding such issues as the choice of indicators and decisions regarding levels of measurement (e.g., whether the concept is operationalized in dichotomous or graded terms). Together, Collier's ideas add up to a forceful statement for seeing concept analysis as a central challenge in political science research and provide an indispensable guide regarding the methodological tools for tackling this challenge. Collier's collection of concept papers was published together with a set of essays by scholars in the field in a volume edited by Zachary Elkins entitled Working with Concepts (Cambridge University Press 2026).

==== Causal inference and qualitative research ====
Another of Collier's central contributions concerns qualitative tools for causal inference. Here, central thrusts of Collier's work have been to put ideas about process tracing on a far more secure footing, and more broadly to codify procedures for qualitative causal inference. This work, published in Rethinking Social Inquiry: Diverse Tools, Shared Standards (1st. ed. 2004, 2nd. ed. 2010, coedited with Henry Brady), and in articles in leading journals, challenges the conventional view that statistical tools are always more powerful for causal inference. Most pointedly, Collier makes a strong case that qualitative researchers actually have an advantage over their quantitative counterparts. This advantage derives from the focus on "causal-process observations" in qualitative analysis. These may be defined as pieces of data that provide information about context and mechanisms, and that offer distinctive leverage in making causal inferences. In this work, as in his work on concepts, Collier has been keenly concerned with exploring how qualitative research can be improved by drawing attention to the multiple challenges faced by qualitative researchers. But Collier has also stressed that both quantitative and qualitative researchers face daunting methodological challenges, and this, in turn, requires a more evenhanded assessment of the strengths and weaknesses of both quantitative and qualitative methods.

Another direction of Collier's work, which springs from the recognition of the shared challenges faced by quantitative and qualitative researchers, has been the exploration of multi-method strategies. Collier's efforts to move beyond traditional methodological boundaries can be seen most vividly in Rethinking Social Inquiry and also in The Oxford Handbook of Political Methodology (2008, co-edited with Janet M. Box-Steffensmeier and Henry E. Brady).

== Major works ==
=== Books ===
- Working with Concepts: Foundational Essays by David Collier, with Research Notes on Innovation in the Field. Edited by Zachary Elkins. Cambridge University Press, 2026.
- Critical Junctures and Historical Legacies: Insights and Methods for Comparative Social Science, co-edited with Gerardo L. Munck (Rowman & Littlefield, 2022).
- Rethinking Social Inquiry: Diverse Tools, Shared Standards, second and expanded edition, co-authored and edited with Henry E. Brady (Rowman & Littlefield, 2010).
- Statistical Models and Causal Inference: A Dialogue with the Social Sciences, by David A. Freedman, edited by David Collier, Jasjeet S. Sekhon, and Philip B. Stark. (Cambridge, 2009).
- Concepts and Method in Social Science: The Tradition of Giovanni Sartori, edited with John Gerring (Routledge, 2009).
- Oxford Handbook of Political Methodology, edited with Janet Box-Steffensmeier and Henry E. Brady (Oxford University Press, 2008).
- Shaping the Political Arena: Critical Junctures, the Labor Movement, and Regime Dynamics in Latin America, co-authored with Ruth Berins Collier (Princeton University Press, 1991; reissued in 2002 by University of Notre Dame Press, with a Preface by Guillermo O’Donnell).
- The New Authoritarianism in Latin America, editor and co-author (Princeton University Press, 1979).
- Squatters and Oligarchs: Authoritarian Rule and Policy Change in Peru (Johns Hopkins, 1976).

=== Selected Articles & Symposia ===
- “Prerequisites versus Diffusion: Testing Alternative Explanations of Social Security Adoption” (with Richard E. Messick). American Political Science Review 69, No. 4 (December 1975): 1299–1315.
- “Industrial Modernization and Political Change: A Latin American Perspective.” World Politics 30, No. 4 (1978): 593–614.
- “Inducements versus Constraints: Disaggregating ‘Corporatism’” (with Ruth Berins Collier). American Political Science Review 73, No. 4 (December 1979): 967–86.
- “Conceptual Stretching Revisited: Adapting Categories in Comparative Analysis” (with James E. Mahon Jr.). American Political Science Review 87, No. 4 (December 1993): 845–55.
- Collier, David. "Translating quantitative methods for qualitative researchers: The case of selection bias. American Political Science Review 89, no. 2 (1995): 461–466.
- “Translating Quantitative Methods for Qualitative Researchers: The Case of Selection Bias.” American Political Science Review 89, No. 2 (June 1995): 461–66.
- Collier, David, and James Mahoney. “Insights and Pitfalls: Selection Bias in Qualitative Research.” World Politics 49, no. 1 (1996): 56–91.
- “Insights and Pitfalls: Selection Bias in Qualitative Research” (with James Mahoney). World Politics 49, No. 1 (October 1996): 56–91.
- “Democracy with Adjectives: Conceptual Innovation in Comparative Research” (with Steven Levitsky). World Politics 49, No. 3 (April 1997): 430–51.
- “Democracy and Dichotomies: A Pragmatic Approach to Choices about Concepts” (with Robert Adcock). Annual Review of Political Science 2 (June 1999). Palo Alto: Annual Reviews.
- “Measurement Validity: A Shared Standard for Qualitative and Quantitative Research” (with Robert Adcock). American Political Science Review 95, No. 3 (September 2001): 529–46.
- “Toward a Pluralistic Vision of Methodology” (with Henry E. Brady and Jason Seawright). Political Analysis 14, No. 3 (June 2006): 353–68.
- Essentially Contested Concepts: Debates and Applications” (with Fernando Daniel Hidalgo and Andra Olivia Maciuceanu). Journal of Political Ideologies 11, No. 3 (October 2006): 211–46.
- “Democracy: Conceptual Hierarchies in Comparative Research” (with Steven Levitsky). In Concepts and Method in Social Science: The Tradition of Giovanni Sartori. Oxford: Routledge, 2009. (This is an extensively revised version of “Democracy with Adjectives” that develops much more fully idea of conceptual hierarchies and applies this revised understanding throughout the article.)
- “Outdated Views of Qualitative Methods: Time to Move On” (with Henry E. Brady and Jason Seawright). Political Analysis 18, No. 4 (Fall 2010): 506–13.
- “Understanding Process Tracing: examples and exercises.” PS: Political Science and Politics 44, No. 4 (October 2011): 823–30.
- “Rival Strategies of Validation: Tools for Evaluating Measures of Democracy” (with Jason Seawright). Comparative Political Studies 47, No. 2 (January 2014): 111–138.
- “Putting Typologies to Work: Levels of Measurement, Concept-Formation, and Analytic Rigor” (with Jody LaPorte and Jason Seawright). Political Research Quarterly 65, No. 1 (February 2012): 217–232.
- “Symposium on Critical Junctures and Historical Legacies” (co-edited with Gerardo Munck). Qualitative and Multi-Method Research 15, No. 1 (Spring 2017): 2–47. (A symposium of ten articles.)
- “Building Blocks and Methodological Challenges: A Framework for Studying Critical Junctures” (with Gerardo Munck). Qualitative and Multi-Method Research 15, No. 1 (Spring 2017): 2–9. (This Introduction to the symposium offers a new synthesis of methodological issues in the study of critical junctures.)

== See also ==
- Stein Rokkan – Norwegian sociologist (1921–1979)
- Alfred Stepan – American political scientist (1936–2017)
