= Julio Cotler =

Peruvian anthropologist, sociologist and political scientist (1932–2019)

- Born: Julio Syuñik Cotler Dolberg; 12 April 1932; Lima, Peru
- Died: 5 April 2019 (aged 86); Lima, Peru
- Education: National University of San Marcos; University of Bordeaux
- Occupations: Anthropologist; sociologist; political scientist

Julio Cotler (12 April 1932 – 5 April 2019) was a Peruvian anthropologist, sociologist and political scientist. He was director of the Institute of Peruvian Studies and professor at the National University of San Marcos.

== Biography ==
He studied at the Colegio San Andrés. He entered the National University of San Marcos from where he graduated as an anthropologist. Later he obtained the title of doctor in sociology at the University of Bordeaux, France. From 1964 to 1965 he served as a visiting researcher at MIT.

He was part of the Institute of Peruvian Studies since 1966 and its director in 1985.

He was also a professor at the National University of San Marcos. He was a visiting professor at the University of Bologna and also worked at the Ortega y Gasset University Institute, at the Center for Constitutional Studies in Madrid, at the Latin American Faculty of Social Sciences in Quito, at The New School for Social Research, among others.

He is considered one of the most outstanding Peruvian thinkers. Through his work he sought to understand the origin and characteristics of the structural problems derived from the Peruvian social formation.

== Academic research ==
Cotler's best known work is Clases, Estado y Nación en el Perú (1992). This book has been described as "an ambitious and intelligently written book which seeks to explain why Peru has failed to develop into a true nation-state with full control over its economy and government" and argues that Peru's problem are due to the country's colonial heritage under Spain.
