= Giovanni Capoccia =

Giovanni Capoccia is Professor of Comparative Politics and Tutorial Fellow in Politics at Corpus Christi College, Oxford.

== Education and career ==
He obtained his Doctorate in political science at the European University Institute of Florence, Italy. Before his present post, he was Tutorial Fellow at Magdalen College, Oxford. He has held a British Academy/Leverhulme Trust Senior Research Fellowship and in 2006-2007 he was the Rita E. Hauser Fellowship at Harvard University, Radcliffe Institute for Advanced Studies.

== Research ==
Capoccia's research focuses on the comparative study of democracy and democratization and the analysis of political institutions, with particular emphasis on European politics. A major theme of his research is the analysis of the causes and consequences of the strategies used by democratic governments to control extremist dissent. His comparative analysis of inter-war Europe provided the material for several journal articles and a monograph entitled Defending Democracy (Johns Hopkins University Press 2005 [paperback 2007]). His current project, Reshaping Democracy after Authoritarianism, for which he has received funding from the British Academy, the Radcliffe Institute for Advanced Studies at Harvard University, the Research Development Fund of Oxford University, and the Nuffield Foundation, analyzes how European democracies have dealt with the political legacies of authoritarianism. His work has received several prizes (including Best Book in European Politics) of the American Political Science Association.
