= Alfred Stepan =

American political scientist (1936–2017)

- Born: July 22, 1936; Chicago, Illinois, U.S.
- Died: September 27, 2017 (aged 81); New York, United States
- Education: University of Notre Dame (BA); Columbia University (PhD)
- Occupations: Professor, political science
- Scientific career
- Workplaces: Yale University; Central European University; Oxford University; Columbia University
- Doctoral advisor: Juan José Linz

Alfred C. Stepan (July 22, 1936 – September 27, 2017) was an American political scientist specializing in comparative politics and Latin American politics. He was the Wallace S. Sayre Professor of Government at Columbia University, where he was also director of the Center for the Study of Democracy, Toleration and Religion. He is known for his comparative politics research on the military, state institutions, democratization, and democracy.

== Life and academic career ==
Stepan was born in Chicago, Illinois in 1936. He graduated from the University of Notre Dame with a B.A. in 1958. He gained his PhD from Columbia University in 1969 where his dissertation was supervised by Juan José Linz.

He subsequently taught at Yale University, before being appointed Dean of the School of International and Public Affairs at Columbia in 1983. He became the first Rector of Central European University (CEU) in 1993, and in 1996 was appointed Gladstone Professor of Government at All Souls College, Oxford University. He returned to Columbia University in 1999. He has been a Fellow of the American Academy of Arts and Sciences since 1991 and a member of the British Academy since 1997.

According to the editors of a collection of essays published in honour of Stepan, he was one of the few academics to be a member of both national social science academies. Stepan was a member of the National Endowment for Democracy's International Forum for Democratic Studies Research Council.

He died at his home in New York on September 27, 2017 from cancer.

== Awards ==
in 1991, Stepan was elected to the American Academy of Arts and Sciences.

In 2002, Stepan was awarded the Order of Rio Branco by the Brazilian government. He has also been awarded the Kalman Silvert Award for his lifetime contribution to Latin American studies.

In 2007, he was included on a list of the 400 most highly cited US-based political scientists.

In 2012, he was awarded the Karl Deutsch Award by the International Political Science Association. The award is intended "to honour a prominent scholar engaged in the cross-disciplinary research of which Karl Deutsch was a master".

== Academic research ==
He authored and edited a number of books, including Arguing Comparative Politics (Oxford University Press, 2001), Crafting State-Nations. India and Other Multinational Democracies (co-authored with Juan Linz and Yogendra Yadav; 2011), Problems of Democratic Transition and Consolidation: Southern Europe, South America, and Post Communist Europe (with Juan Linz; 1996) and Democracies in Danger (2009).

=== The Military in Politics ===
The Military in Politics, Stepan analyzes the breakdown of democracy in Brazil in 1964. Stepan "challenged the prevailing view in comparative research that saw the military as a force for achieving modernization and national integration." He also showed that "understanding the military’s political behavior ... required a focus on the broader context of civil-military relations."

=== The State and Society. Peru in Comparative Perspective ===
In this book, Stepan "critiqued both pluralist and Marxist approaches for focusing insufficient attention on state elites." This work defined Stepan "as an early and key contributor to the ‘‘new institutional’’ research that emphasized the potential autonomy of political institutions from economic, societal, and cultural forces."

=== The Breakdown of Democratic Regimes ===
The Breakdown of Democratic Regimes is a four volume coedited work with Juan Linz. It emphasizes "how the actions of democratically elected incumbents contributed to the demise of democracy."

=== Rethinking Military Politics. Brazil and the Southern Cone ===
In Rethinking Military Politics, Stepan "argued that to achieve stable democracy, civilian elites in newly democratic regimes had to find ways to handle the problem of establishing civilian control over the armed forces."

=== Problems of Democratic Transition and Consolidation ===
This work on democratization, with Juan Linz, provides a cross-regional comparison of thirteen countries in South America, Southern Europe, and postcommunist Europe. It introducing a novel focus on ‘‘stateness’’ problems stemming from nationalist conflicts. It also argues the type of old non-democratic regime affected subsequent trajectories of democratization.

== Major works ==
- The Military in Politics. Changing Patterns in Brazil. Princeton, NJ: Princeton University Press, 1971.
- The State and Society. Peru in Comparative Perspective. Princeton, NJ: Princeton University Press, 1978.
- The Breakdown of Democratic Regimes. 4 Vols, edited with Juan José Linz. Baltimore, Md.: The Johns Hopkins University Press, 1978.
- Rethinking Military Politics. Brazil and the Southern Cone. Princeton, NJ: Princeton University Press, 1988.
- "Constitutional frameworks and democratic consolidation: Parliamentarianism versus presidentialism", with Cindy Skach. World Politics 46(1) (1993): 1-22.
- Problems of Democratic Transition and Consolidation: Southern Europe, South America and Post-Communist Europe, with Juan José Linz. Baltimore, Md.: The Johns Hopkins University Press, 1996.
- Arguing Comparative Politics Oxford: Oxford University Press, 2001.
- Democracies in Danger, ed. Baltimore, Md.: The Johns Hopkins University Press, 2009.
- Crafting State-Nations. India and Other Multinational Democracies, with Juan José Linz and Yogendra Yadav. Baltimore, Md.: The Johns Hopkins University Press, 2011.
- Boundaries of Toleration, edited with Charles. Taylor. New York.: Columbia University Press, 2014.

== See also ==
- David Collier – American political scientist (born 1942)
- Guillermo O'Donnell – Argentine political scientist (1936–2011)
