= Miguel A. Centeno =

American sociologist (born 1957)

Miguel Angel Centeno (born 18 July 1957) is an American sociologist.

Centeno was educated at Yale University, where he received a Bachelor of Arts degree in history in 1980, followed by a master of business administration in 1987, and a doctorate in sociology in 1990. He is the Musgrave Professor of Sociology at Princeton University, and teaches sociology and international affairs at the university's Princeton School of Public and International Affairs.

Centeno’s work has focused on the relationship between warfare, taxation, and state formation, particularly in Latin America. In Blood and Debt: War and the Nation-State in Latin America (2002), he argued that the region’s relatively weak state structures stemmed from the absence of large-scale, “total” wars. Unlike in Europe, where prolonged conflicts demanded direct taxation and administrative expansion, Latin American governments often financed limited wars through customs revenues and foreign loans, which did not require the development of strong fiscal or bureaucratic institutions.

His broader research examines how external threats and internal conflicts affect state capacity and social consent. Centeno proposed that even limited militarization can temporarily strengthen the state by increasing extraction and mobilization, but that these effects are often short-lived once wartime pressures subside. His comparative approach has influenced debates on fiscal capacity, development, and the distinctive historical trajectories of Latin American states.
