= Democratization =

Society becoming more democratic

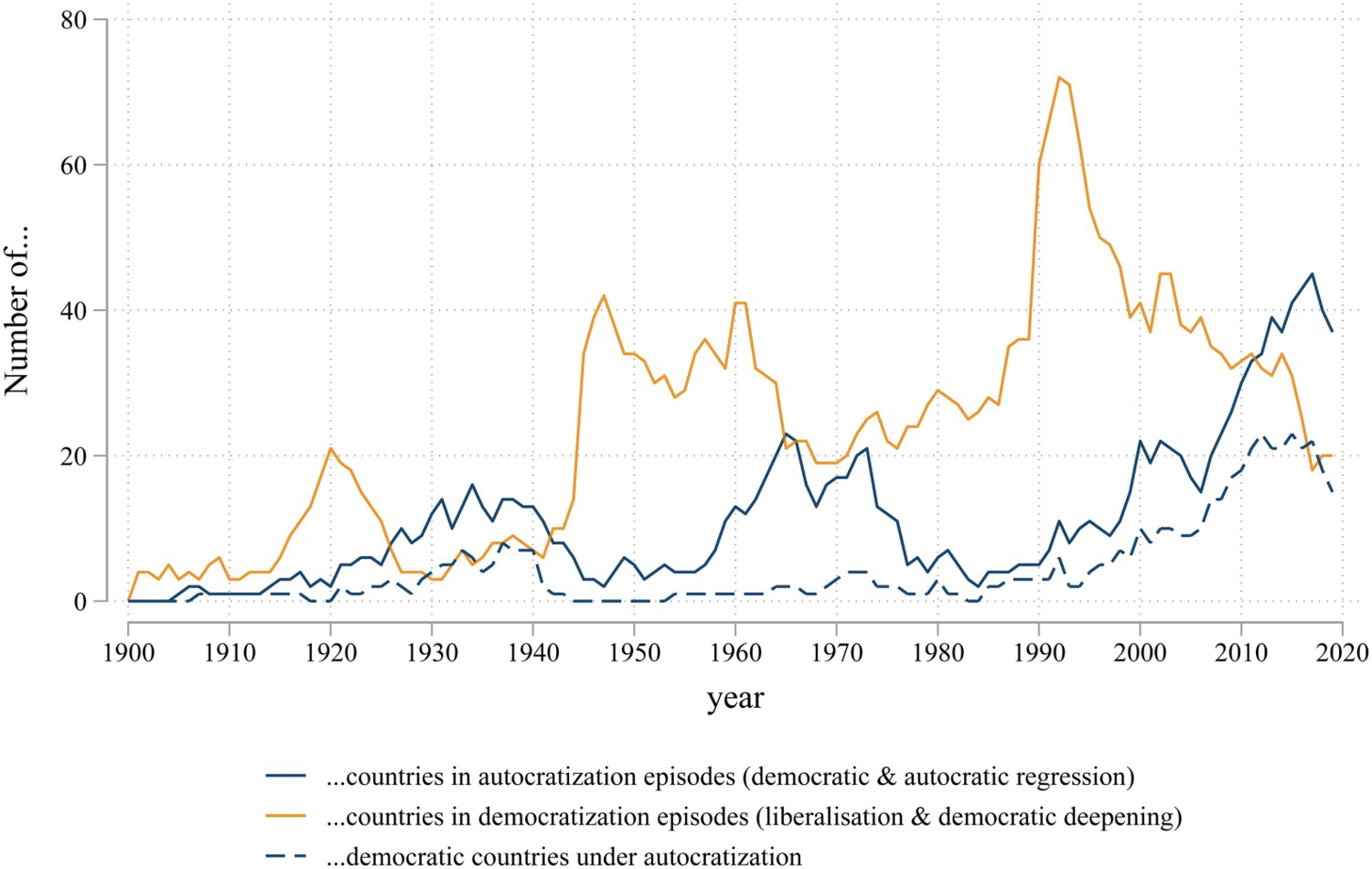
Since 1900, the number of countries democratizing (yellow) has been higher than those autocratizing (blue), except in the late 1920s through 1940s and since 2010.

Democratization, or democratisation, is the structural government transition from an authoritarian government to a more democratic political regime, including substantive political changes moving in a democratic direction. The opposite process of democratic transition is known as democratic backsliding or autocratization. Whether and to what extent democratization occurs can be influenced by various factors, including economic development, historical legacies, civil society, and international processes. Some accounts of democratization emphasize how elites drove democratization, whereas other accounts emphasize grassroots bottom-up processes. How democratization occurs has also been used to explain other political phenomena, such as whether a country goes to a war or whether its economy grows.

== Description ==
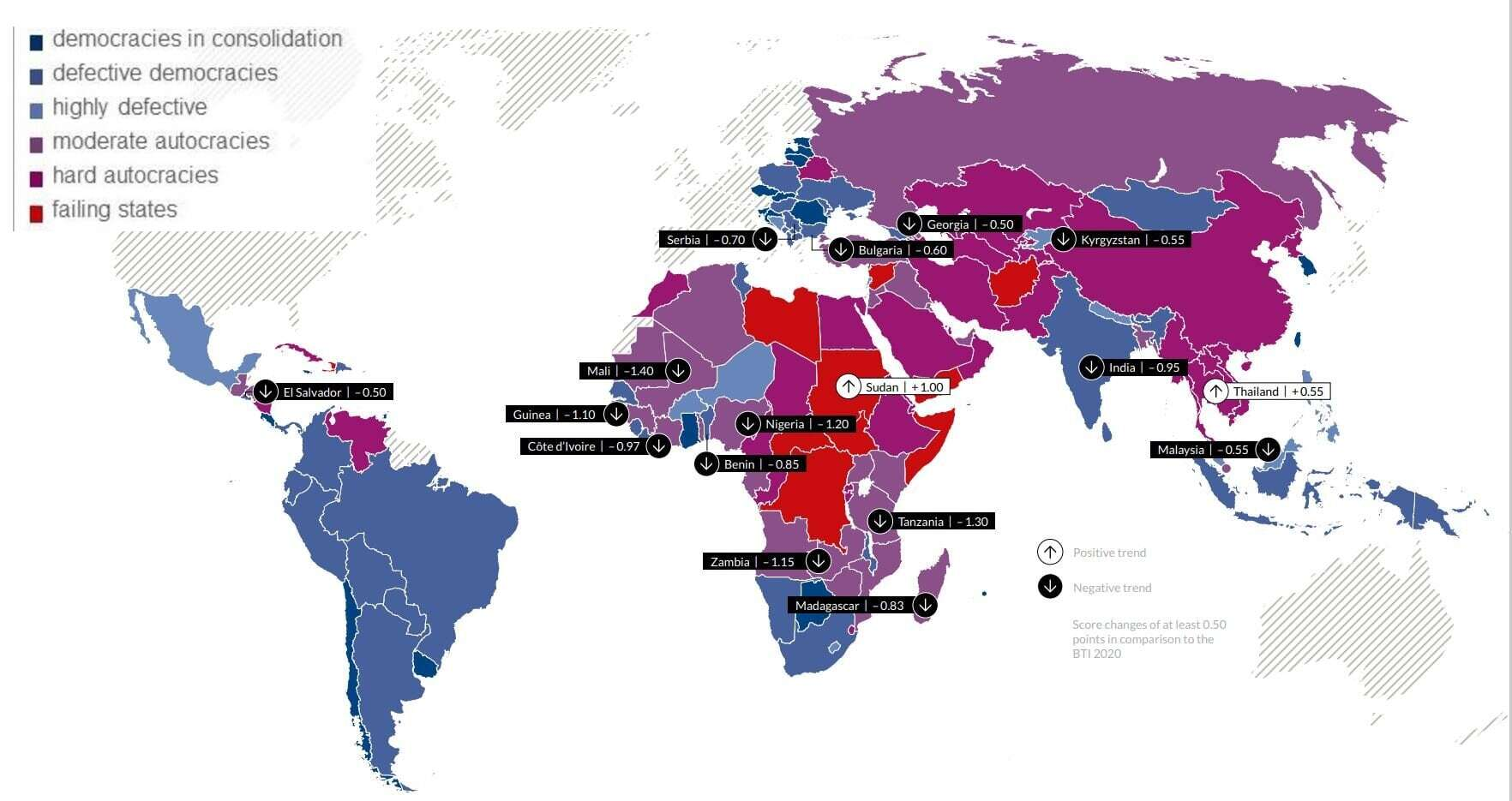
Global trend report Bertelsmann Transformation Index 2022

Theories of democratization seek to explain a large macro-level change of a political regime from authoritarianism to democracy. Symptoms of democratization include reform of the electoral system, increased suffrage and reduced political apathy.

=== Measures of democratization ===
Democracy indices enable the quantitative assessment of democratization. Some common democracy indices are Freedom House, Polity data series, V-Dem Democracy indices, and Democracy Index. Democracy indices can be quantitative or categorical. Some disagreements among scholars concern the concept of democracy and how to measure democracy, and what democracy indices should be used.

=== Waves of democratization ===
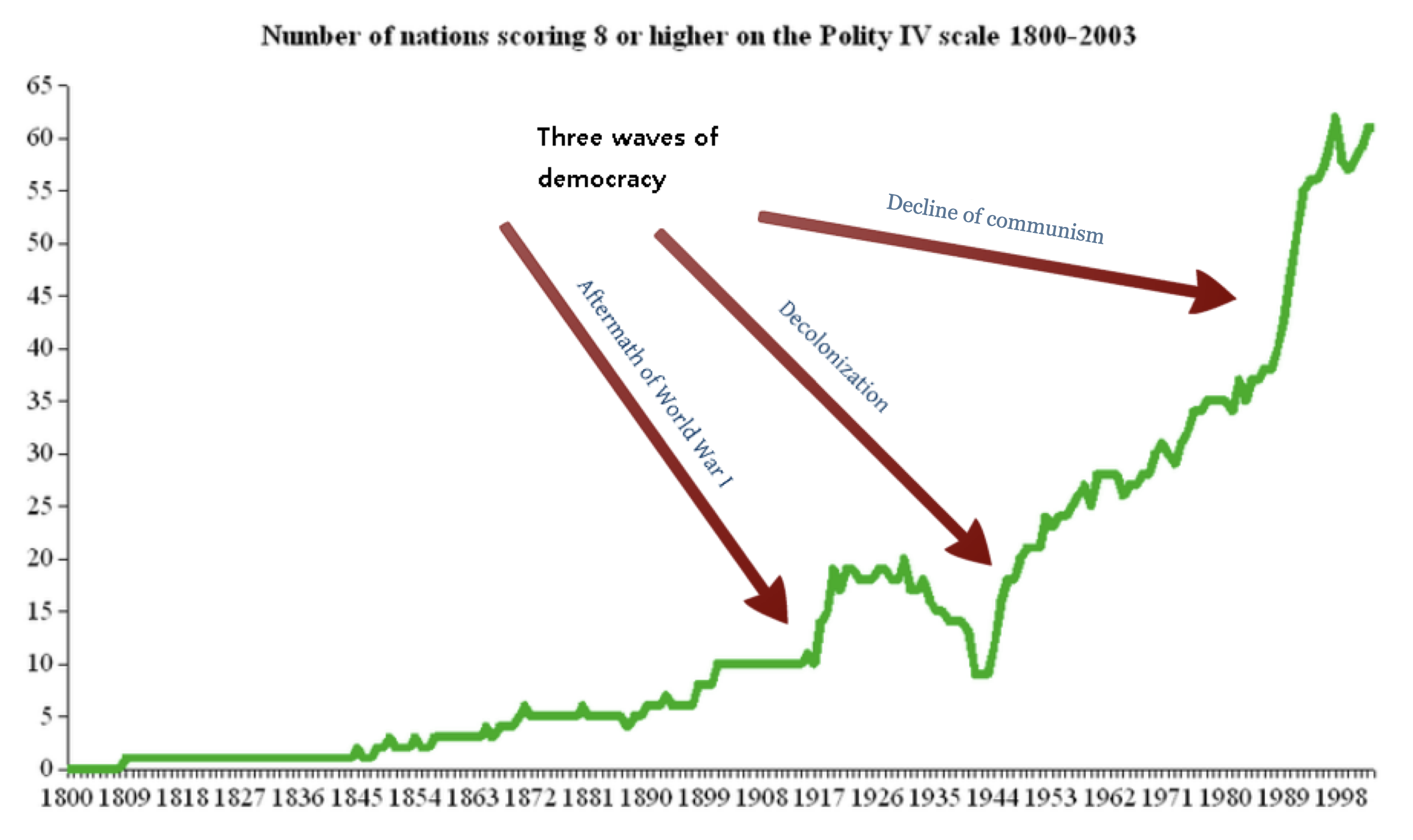
The three waves of democracy identified by Samuel P. Huntington

One way to summarize the outcome theories of democratization seek to account is with the idea of waves of democratization. A wave of democratization refers to a major surge of democracy in history. Samuel P. Huntington identified three waves of democratization that have taken place in history. The first one brought democracy to Western Europe and North America in the 19th century. It was followed by a rise of dictatorships during the Interwar period. The second wave began after World War II, but lost steam between 1962 and the mid-1970s. The latest wave began in 1974 and is still ongoing. Democratization of Latin America and the former Eastern Bloc is part of this third wave. Waves of democratization can be followed by waves of de-democratization. In 1991, Huntington offered the following depiction:

- First wave of democratization, 1828–1926
- First wave of de-democratization, 1922–1942
- Second wave of democratization, 1943–1962
- Second wave of de-democratization, 1958–1975
- Third wave of democratization, 1974–

The idea of waves of democratization has been used and scrutinized by many other authors, including Renske Doorenspleet, John Markoff, Seva Gunitsky, and Svend-Erik Skaaning. According to Seva Gunitsky, from the 18th century to the Arab Spring (2011–2012), 13 democratic waves can be identified.

== By country ==
Throughout the history of democracy, enduring democracy advocates succeed almost always through peaceful means when there is a window of opportunity. One major type of opportunity include governments weakened after a violent shock. The other main avenue occurs when autocrats are not threatened by elections, and democratize while retaining power. The path to democracy can be long with setbacks along the way.

The V-Dem Institute found ongoing democratization during the year 2025 in 18 countries: Benin, Bolivia, Botswana, Brazil, Dominican Republic, Fiji, Guatemala, Lesotho, Mauritius, Montenegro, Poland, Seychelles, Solomon Islands, Sri Lanka, Timor-Leste, Thailand, The Gambia, and Zambia.

=== Athens ===
The Athenian Revolution (508–507 BCE) was a revolt by the people of Athens that overthrew the ruling aristocratic oligarchy, establishing the almost century-long self-governance of Athens in the form of a participatory democracy – open to all free male citizens. It was a reaction to a broader trend of tyranny that had swept through Athens and the rest of Greece.

=== Benin ===
The 1989–1990 unrest in Benin was a wave of protests, demonstrations, nonviolent boycotts, grassroots rallies, opposition campaigns and strikes in Benin against the government of Mathieu Kérékou, unpaid salaries, and new budget laws.

=== Brazil ===
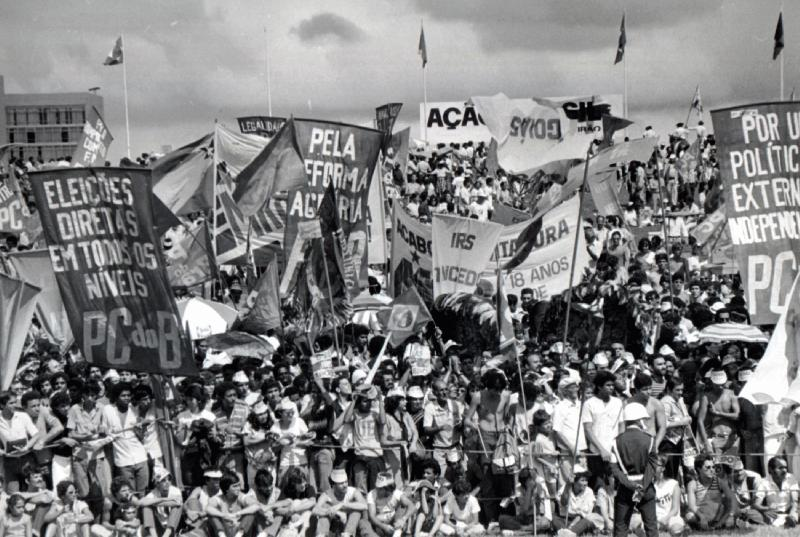
Diretas Já demonstration in Brasília for open elections

The redemocratization of Brazil (Portuguese: abertura política, lit. 'political opening') was the 1974–1988 period of liberalization under the country's military dictatorship, ending with the decline of the regime, the signing of the country's new constitution, and the transition to democracy. Then-president Ernesto Geisel began the process of liberalization (nicknamed Portuguese: distensão) in 1974, by allowing for the Brazilian Democratic Movement opposition party's participation in congressional elections. He worked to address human rights violations and began to undo the military dictatorship's founding legislation, the Institutional Acts, in 1978. General João Figueiredo, elected the next year, continued the transition to democracy, freeing the last political prisoners in 1980 and instituting direct elections in 1982. The 1985 election of a ruling opposition party marked the military dictatorship's end. The process of liberalization ultimately was successful, culminating with the promulgation of the 1988 Brazilian Constitution.

=== Chile ===
The transition to democracy in Chile, also known in Spanish as La Transición ("the transition"), refers to the historical process by which Chile moved away from the military dictatorship led by General Augusto Pinochet, which had ruled the country since the 1973 coup d'état that overthrew President Salvador Allende, and restored a democratically elected government. The dictatorship formally ended on 11 March 1990, when the armed forces handed executive power to Patricio Aylwin, a Christian Democrat elected after the 1988 plebiscite and the 1989 presidential election.

=== France ===
The French Revolution (1789) briefly allowed a wide franchise. The French Revolutionary Wars and the Napoleonic Wars lasted for more than twenty years. The French Directory was more oligarchic. The First French Empire and the Bourbon Restoration restored more autocratic rule. The French Second Republic had universal male suffrage but was followed by the Second French Empire. The Franco-Prussian War (1870–71) resulted in the French Third Republic.

=== Germany ===
Germany established its first democracy in 1919 with the creation of the Weimar Republic, a parliamentary republic created following the German Empire's defeat in World War I. The Weimar Republic lasted only 14 years before it collapsed and was replaced by Nazi dictatorship. Historians continue to debate the reasons why the Weimar Republic's attempt at democratization failed. After Germany was militarily defeated in World War II, democracy was reestablished in West Germany during the U.S.-led occupation which undertook the denazification of society.

=== Greece ===
The Metapolitefsi was a period in modern Greek history from the fall of the Ioannides military junta of 1973–74 to the transition period shortly after the 1974 legislative elections.

=== Italy ===
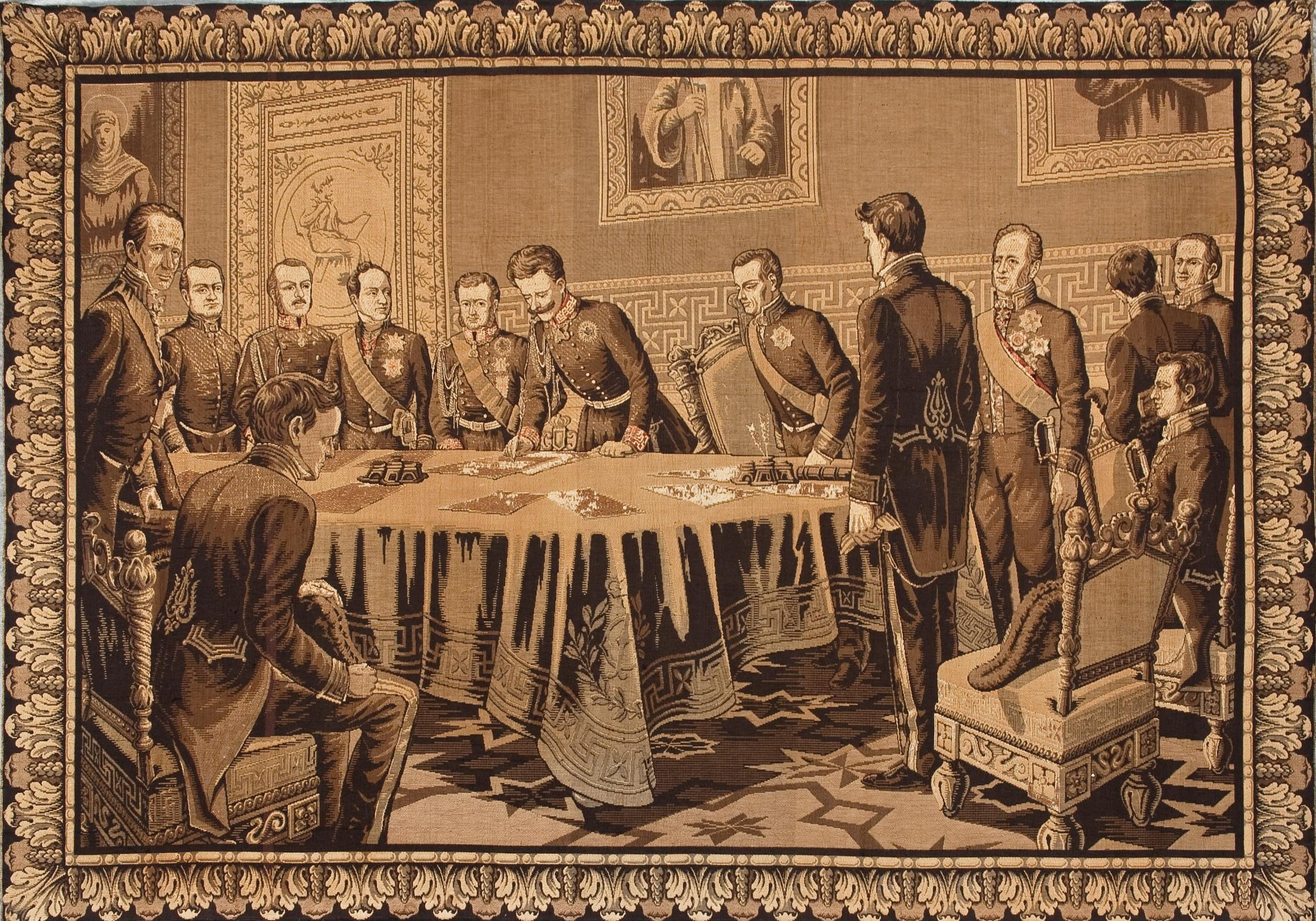
King Charles Albert of Sardinia signs the Albertine Statute, 4 March 1848.

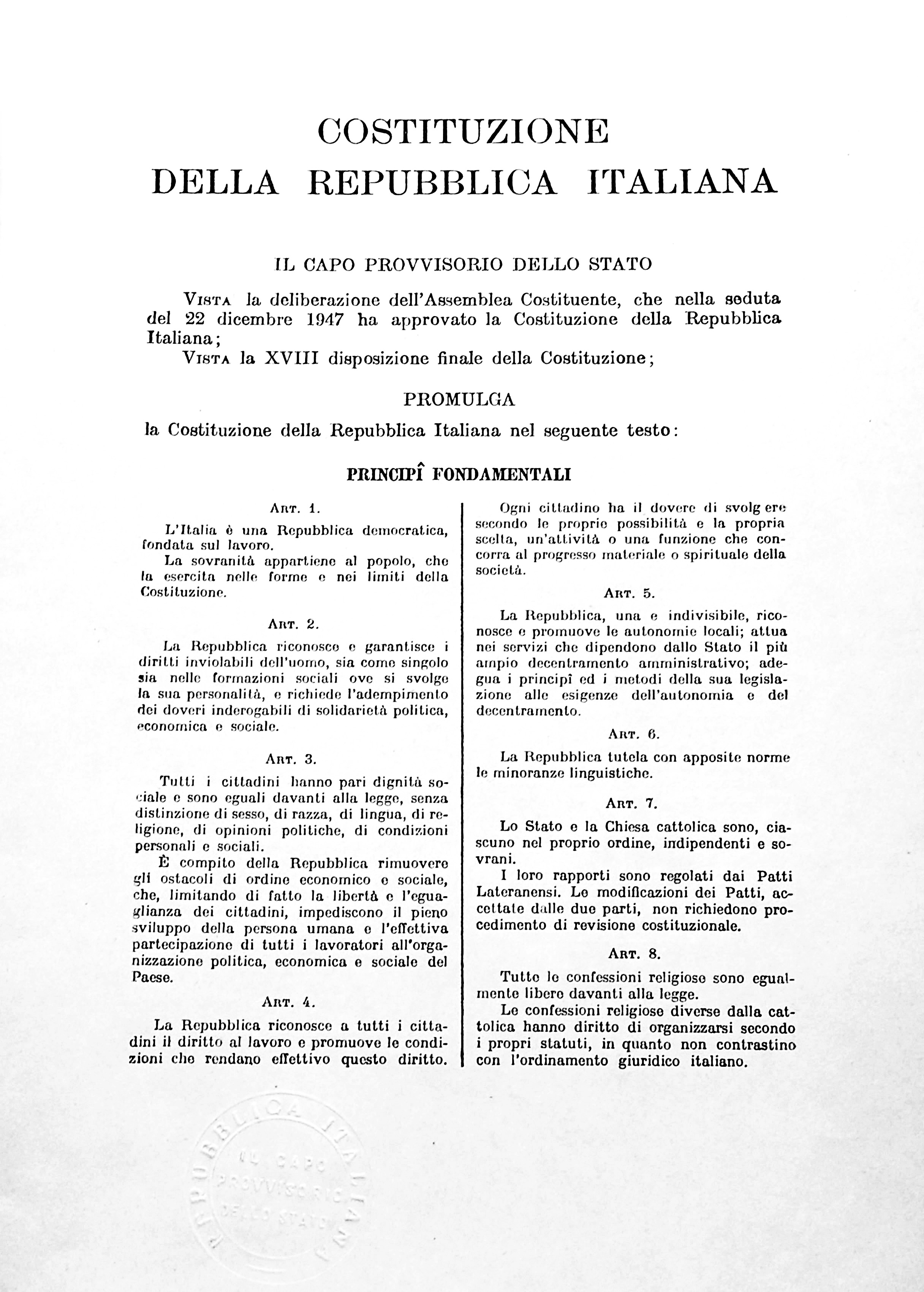
The Constitution of the Italian Republic came into force on 1 January 1948 after the 1946 Italian institutional referendum.

In September 1847, violent riots inspired by Liberals broke out in Reggio Calabria and in Messina in the Kingdom of the Two Sicilies, which were put down by the military. On 12 January 1848 a rising in Palermo spread throughout the island and served as a spark for the Revolutions of 1848 all over Europe. After similar revolutionary outbursts in Salerno, south of Naples, and in the Cilento region which were backed by the majority of the intelligentsia of the Kingdom, on 29 January 1848 King Ferdinand II of the Two Sicilies was forced to grant a constitution, using for a pattern the French Charter of 1830. This constitution was quite advanced for its time in liberal democratic terms, as was the proposal of a unified Italian confederation of states. On 11 February 1848, Leopold II of Tuscany, first cousin of Emperor Ferdinand I of Austria, granted the Constitution, with the general approval of his subjects. The Habsburg example was followed by Charles Albert of Sardinia through the Albertine Statute, which later became the constitution of the unified Kingdom of Italy and remained in force, with changes, until 1948, and by Pope Pius IX through the Fundamental Statute; however, only King Charles Albert maintained the statute even after the end of the riots.

The Kingdom of Italy, after the unification of Italy in 1861, was a constitutional monarchy. The new kingdom was governed by a parliamentary constitutional monarchy dominated by liberals. (Note: In 1848, Camillo Benso, Count of Cavour had formed a parliamentary group in the Kingdom of Sardinia Parliament named the Partito Liberale Italiano (Italian Liberal Party). From 1860, with the unification of Italy substantially realized and the death of Cavour himself in 1861, the Liberal Party was split into at least two major factions or new parties later known as the Destra Storica on the right-wing, who substantially assembled the Count of Cavour's followers and political heirs; and the Sinistra Storica on the left-wing, who mostly reunited the followers and sympathizers of Giuseppe Garibaldi and other former Mazzinians. The Historical Right (Destra Storica) and the Historical Left (Sinistra Storica) were composed of royalist liberals. At the same time, radicals organized themselves into the Radical Party and republicans into the Italian Republican Party.) The Italian Socialist Party increased in strength, challenging the traditional liberal and conservative establishment. From 1915 to 1918, the Kingdom of Italy took part in World War I on the side of the Entente and against the Central Powers. In 1922, following a period of crisis and turmoil, the Italian fascist dictatorship was established. During World War II, Italy was first part of the Axis until it surrendered to the Allied powers (1940–1943) and then, as part of its territory was occupied by Nazi Germany with fascist collaboration, a co-belligerent of the Allies during the Italian resistance and the subsequent Italian Civil War, and the liberation of Italy (1943–1945). The aftermath of World War II left Italy also with an anger against the monarchy for its endorsement of the Fascist Italy regime for the previous twenty years. These frustrations contributed to a revival of the Italian republican movement. Italy became a republic after the 1946 Italian institutional referendum, held on 2 June, a day celebrated since as Festa della Repubblica. Italy has a written democratic constitution, resulting from the work of a Constituent Assembly formed by the representatives of all the anti-fascist forces that contributed to the defeat of Nazi and Fascist forces during the liberation of Italy and the Italian Civil War, and coming into force on 1 January 1948.

=== Japan ===
In Japan, limited democratic reforms were introduced during the Meiji period (when the industrial modernization of Japan began), the Taishō period (1912–1926), and the early Shōwa period. Despite pro-democracy movements such as the Freedom and People's Rights Movement (1870s and 1880s) and some proto-democratic institutions, Japanese society remained constrained by a highly conservative society and bureaucracy. Historian Kent E. Calder notes that writers that "Meiji leadership embraced constitutional government with some pluralist features for essentially tactical reasons" and that pre-World war II Japanese society was dominated by a "loose coalition" of "landed rural elites, big business, and the military" that was averse to pluralism and reformism. While the Imperial Diet survived the impacts of Japanese militarism, the Great Depression, and the Pacific War, other pluralistic institutions, such as political parties, did not. After World War II, during the Allied occupation, Japan adopted a much more vigorous, pluralistic democracy.

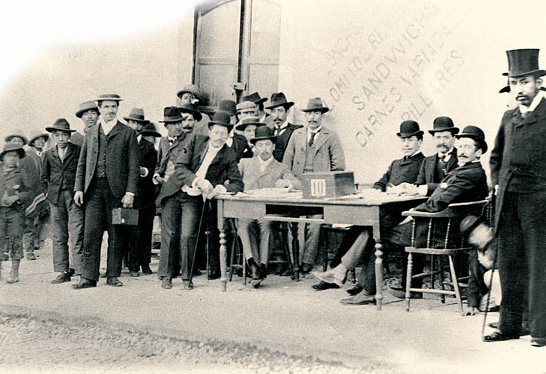
Voting in Valparaíso, Chile, in 1888

=== Madagascar ===
The 1990–1992 movement in Madagascar (Malagasy: Fihetsiketsehana 1990-1992 teto Madagasikara) was a period of widespread popular unrest in Madagascar between March 1990 and August 1992. It began as a wave of strike action against the autocratic regime of President Didier Ratsiraka and culminated in the promulgation of a new constitution and a period of democratic transition leading to Ratsiraka handing the Presidency to opposition leader Albert Zafy in March 1993.

=== Malawi ===
Banda agreed to hold the referendum in response to international pressure and growing domestic unrest. Opposition groups had initially doubted the legitimacy of the process, but eventually participated once they were allowed to register as “special interest groups” and after a series of discussions led to an agreed legal framework. Major opposition participants included the Catholic and Presbyterian Churches, the United Democratic Front (representing internal opponents and dissident government officials), and the Alliance for Democracy (linked to trade unions and opposition groups in exile).

=== Latin America ===
Countries in Latin America became independent between 1810 and 1825, and soon had some early experiences with representative government and elections. All Latin American countries established representative institutions soon after independence, the early cases being those of Colombia in 1810, Paraguay and Venezuela in 1811, and Chile in 1818. Adam Przeworski shows that some experiments with representative institutions in Latin America occurred earlier than in most European countries. Mass democracy, in which the working class had the right to vote, become common only in the 1930s and 1940s.

=== Portugal ===
Portugal's redemocratization process started with the Carnation Revolution of 1974. It ended with the enactment of the Constitution of Portugal in 1976.

=== Philippines ===
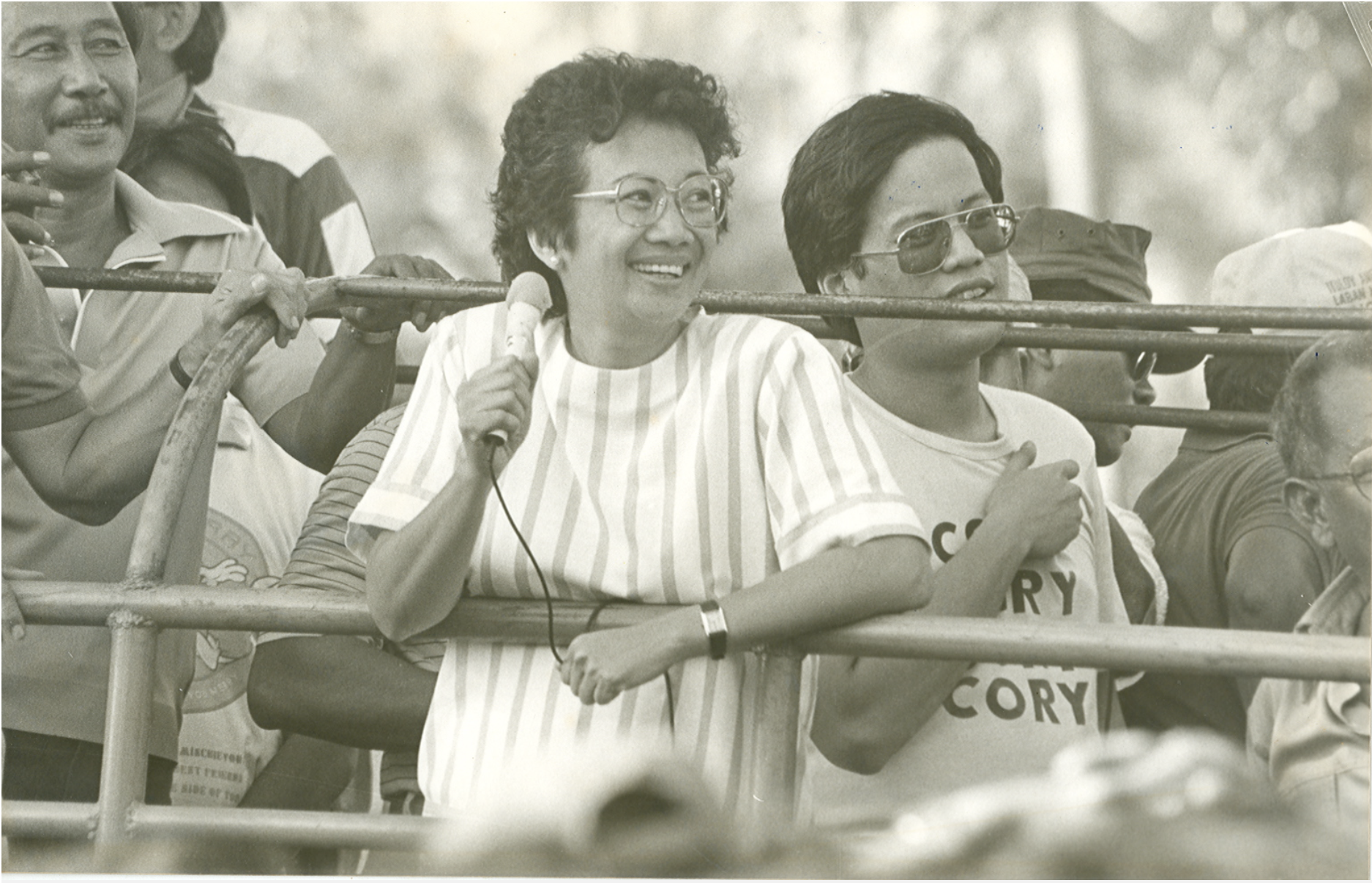
A picture of Corazon Aquino campaigning under the UNIDO banner during the 1986 snap elections

In 1986, democratic institutions throughout the Philippines were reinstated during the deposition of the 20-year long Marcos regime through the People Power Revolution.

Barred constitutionally from running a third term by 1973, Ferdinand Marcos and his administration announced Proclamation No. 1081 on September 23, 1972, a declaration of martial law that deliberately decreed emergency powers over every democratic functions in the country, ostensibly under the pretext of a communist overthrow. Throughout the 20-year long martial law, most civil liberties of the once democratic Philippines were suppressed, criminalized, or just plainly abolished. By 1981, the loan-reliant economy of the Marcos regime experienced unforecasted contractions when the Reagan administration announced the lowering of American interest rates during the global recession at that time, further plunging the Philippine economy into debt.

In 1983, Ninoy Aquino, a renowned dissident of the Marcos regime, returned to the Philippines after his self-exile in the United States. After disembarking China Airlines Flight 811 on Gate 8 at Manila International Airport, Aquino, on the service steps of his van guarded by the Aviation Security Command (AVESCOM), was shot multiple times by assailants outside the van at point blank. He died from his wounds on the way to Fort Bonifacio Hospital.

In response to the assassination of Aquino, public outrage revitalized in the form of Jose W. Diokno's nationalist liberal democrat umbrella organization, the Kilusan sa Kapangyarihan at Karapatan ng Bayan or KAAKBAY, then leading the Justice for Aquino Justice for All or JAJA movement. JAJA consisted of the social democrat-dominant August Twenty One Movement or the ATOM, led by Butz Aquino. These political movements and organizations coalesced into the Kongreso ng Mamamayang Pilipino or KOMPIL, a call for parliamentarianism and democratization during this period. In the middle of 1984, JAJA was replaced by the Coalition for the Restoration of Democracy (CORD), with largely the same principles.

In November 1985, the rapid development of opposition organizations swayed the Marcos administration, with some American intervention, to announce the Batas Pambansa Blg. 883 (National Law No. 883), a 1986 snap election, by the unicameral body, the Regular Batasang Pambansa. Immediately after the decree, the United Nationalist Democratic Organization (UNIDO), the main opposition multi-party electoral alliance, rallied even more public support, headed by assigned party leader Corazon Aquino, Benigno Aquino's wife, and Salvador Laurel.

The 1986 snap election was marred with electoral fraud, as discrepant figures from both the government-sponsored election canvasser, Commission on Elections (COMELEC), and the publicly-accredited poll watcher, National Movement for Free Elections (NAMFREL), finalized different tally figures. COMELEC announced a Marcos victory of 10,810,000 votes against Aquino's 9,300,000, while NAMFREL announced an Aquino victory of 7,840,000 votes against Marcos' 7,050,000. The apparent tampered snap election stirred public unrest, even prompting COMELEC technicians to proceed with a walkout mid-voting, an event cited to be the first act of civil disobedience during the People Power Revolution.

Occurring afterwards were a series of popular demonstrations against the regime occurring from February 22 to 26, referred to as the People Power Revolution, then culminating into the departure of Marcos and the non-violent transition of power, restoring democracy under Aquino's UNIDO. Immediately after Aquino's ascension, she ratified Proclamation No. 3, a law declaring a provisional constitution and government. The promulgation of the 1986 Freedom Constitution superseded many of the autocratic provisions of the 1973 Constitution, abolishing the Regular Batasang Pambansa, along with plebiscitarian dependence for the creation of a new Congress. The official adoption of the 1987 Constitution signalled the completion of Philippine democratization.

=== Senegal ===
The Democracy in Senegal was touted as one of the more stable democracies in Africa, with a long tradition of peaceful democratic discourse. Democratization proceeded gradually from 1970s to 1990s.

=== Spain ===
The Spanish transition to democracy, known in Spain as la Transición (IPA: [la tɾansiˈθjon]; 'the Transition') or la Transición española ('the Spanish Transition'), officially the Spanish State from 1975 to 1978 and Kingdom of Spain thereafter, was a period of modern Spanish history encompassing the regime change that moved from the Francoist dictatorship to the consolidation of a parliamentary system, in the form of constitutional monarchy under Juan Carlos I.

The democratic transition began two days after the death of Francisco Franco, in November 1975. Initially, "the political elites left over from Francoism" attempted "reform of the institutions of dictatorship" through existing legal means, but social and political pressure saw the formation of a democratic parliament in the 1977 general election, which had the imprimatur to write a new constitution that was then approved by referendum in December 1978. The following years saw the beginning of the development of the rule of law and establishment of regional government, amidst ongoing terrorism, an attempted coup d'état and global economic problems. The Transition is said to have concluded after the landslide victory of the Spanish Socialist Workers' Party (PSOE) in the 1982 general election and the first peaceful transfer of executive power. (Note: Some historians suggest an earlier date for the conclusion of the Transition including the 1977 general election, the 1978 Constitution, or the 1981 attempted coup. One writer suggests the Transition only concluded in 2006 with the end of consensus politics and the re-emergence of open debate on divisive issues.)

=== South Africa ===
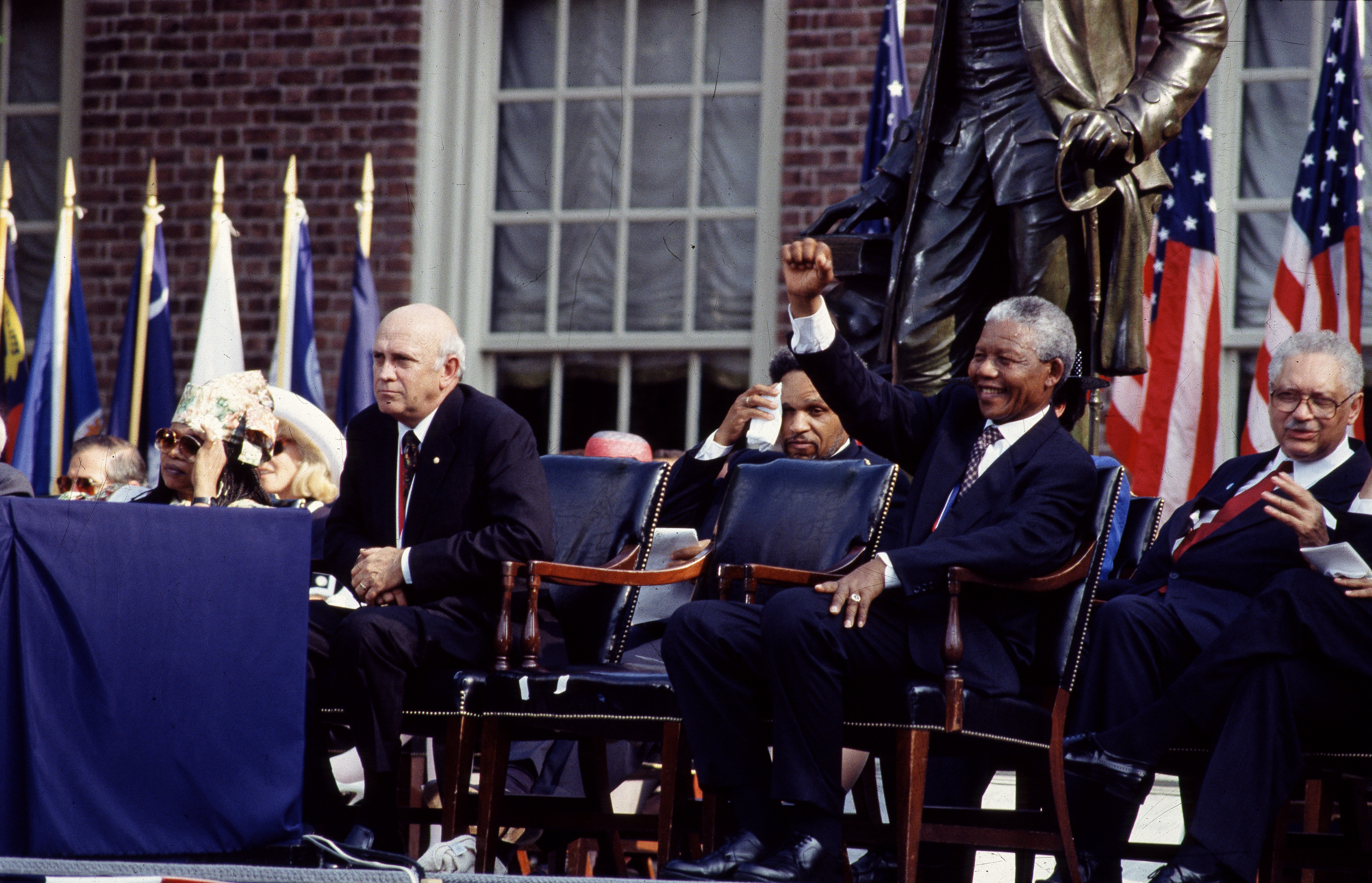
F. W. de Klerk and Nelson Mandela in July 1993, near the close of negotiations, in Philadelphia, Pennsylvania wait to jointly receive the Liberty Medal.

The apartheid system in South Africa was ended through a series of bilateral and multi-party negotiations between 1990 and 1993. The negotiations culminated in the passage of a new interim Constitution in 1993, a precursor to the Constitution of 1996; and in South Africa's first non-racial elections in 1994, won by the African National Congress (ANC) liberation movement.

=== South Korea ===
The June Democratic Struggle (Korean: 6월 민주 항쟁), also known as the June Democracy Movement and the June Uprising, was a nationwide pro-democracy movement in South Korea that generated mass protests from 10 to 29 June 1987. The demonstrations forced the ruling authoritarian government to hold direct presidential elections and institute other democratic reforms, which led to the establishment of the Sixth Republic, the present-day government of the Republic of Korea (South Korea).

=== Soviet Union ===
Demokratizatsiya (Russian: демократизация, IPA: [dʲɪməkrətʲɪˈzatsɨjə], democratization) was a slogan introduced by CPSU General Secretary Mikhail Gorbachev in January 1987 calling for the infusion of "democratic" elements into the Soviet Union's single-party government. Gorbachev's Demokratizatsiya meant the introduction of multi-candidate—though not multi-party—elections for local Communist Party (CPSU) officials and Soviets. In this way, he hoped to rejuvenate the party with reform-minded personnel who would carry out his institutional and policy reforms. The CPSU would retain sole custody of the ballot box.

=== Switzerland ===
The rise of federalism in Switzerland began on 12 September 1848, with the creation of a federal constitution in response to a 27-day civil war, the Sonderbundskrieg.

=== Roman Republic ===
The overthrow of the Roman monarchy was an event in ancient Rome that took place between the 6th and 5th centuries BC where a political revolution replaced the then-existing Roman monarchy under Lucius Tarquinius Superbus with a republic. The details of the event were largely forgotten by the Romans a few centuries later; later Roman historians presented a narrative of the events, traditionally dated to c. 509 BC, but it is largely believed by modern scholars to be fictitious.

=== Tunisia ===
The Tunisian revolution (Arabic: الثورة التونسية), also called the Jasmine Revolution and Tunisian Revolution of Dignity, was an intensive 28-day campaign of civil resistance. It included a series of street demonstrations which took place in Tunisia, and led to the ousting of longtime dictator Zine El Abidine Ben Ali in January 2011. It eventually led to a thorough democratization of the country and to free and democratic elections, which had led to it being described as the only successful movement in the Arab Spring.

=== Ukraine ===
From the formal establishment of the People's Movement of Ukraine on 1 July 1989 to the formalisation of the Declaration of Independence of Ukraine via referendum on 1 December 1991, a non-violent protest movement worked to achieve Ukrainian independence from the Soviet Union. Led by Soviet dissident Viacheslav Chornovil, the protests began as a series of strikes in the Donbas that led to the removal of longtime communist leader Volodymyr Shcherbytsky. Later, the protests grew in size and scope, leading to a human chain across the country and widespread student protests for further democratisation and the need to elect a non-Communist majority in the next parliamentary elections. The protests were ultimately successful, leading to the independence of Ukraine amidst the broader dissolution of the Soviet Union.

=== United Kingdom ===
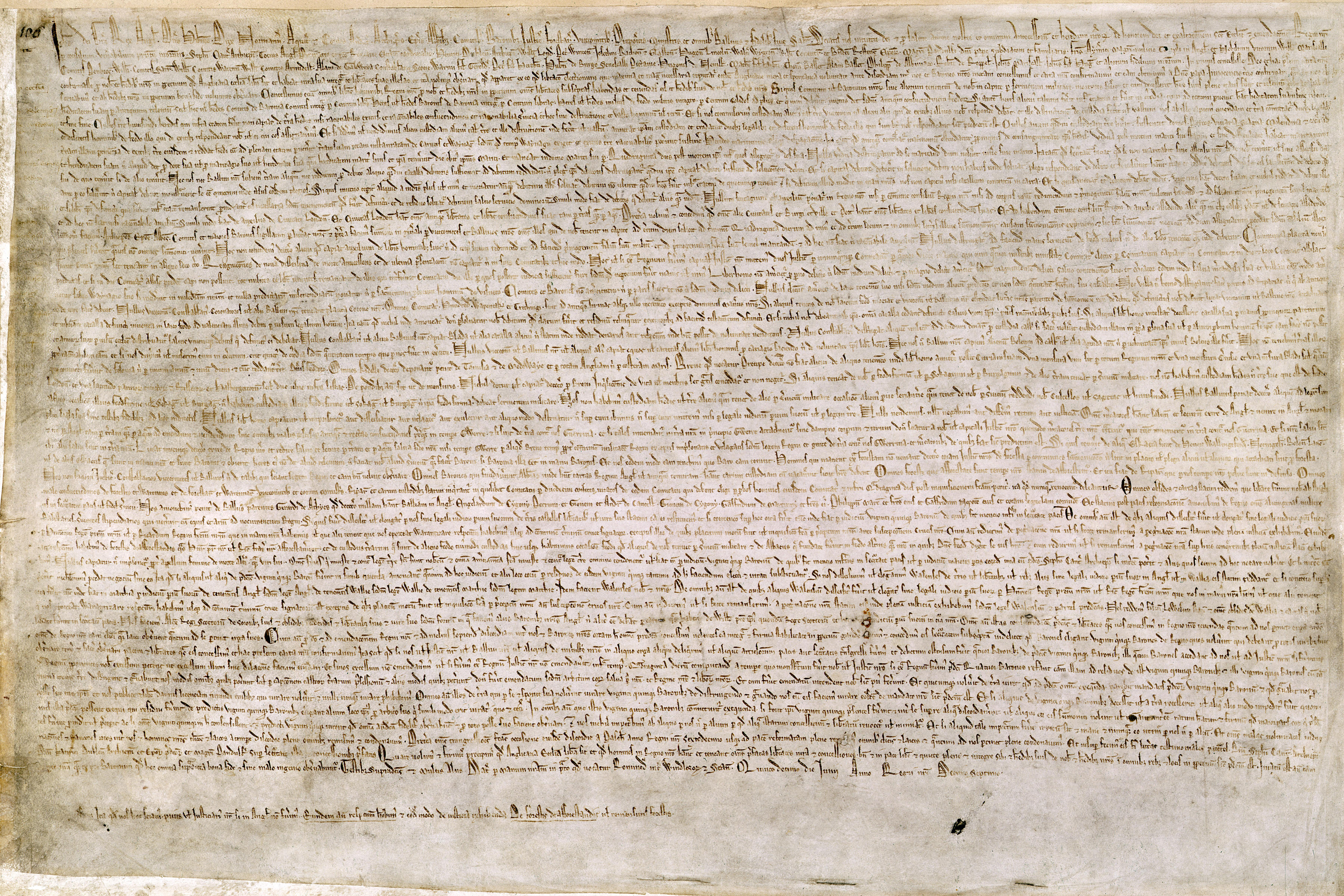
Magna Carta in the British Library. The document was described as "the chief cause of Democracy in England".

In Great Britain, there was renewed interest in Magna Carta in the 17th century. The Parliament of England enacted the Petition of Right in 1628 which established certain liberties for subjects. The English Civil War (1642–1651) was fought between the King and an oligarchic but elected Parliament, during which the idea of a political party took form with groups debating rights to political representation during the Putney Debates of 1647. Subsequently, the Protectorate (1653–59) and the English Restoration (1660) restored more autocratic rule although Parliament passed the Habeas Corpus Act in 1679, which strengthened the convention that forbade detention lacking sufficient cause or evidence. The Glorious Revolution in 1688 established a strong Parliament that passed the Bill of Rights 1689, which codified certain rights and liberties for individuals. It set out the requirement for regular parliaments, free elections, rules for freedom of speech in Parliament and limited the power of the monarch, ensuring that, unlike much of the rest of Europe, royal absolutism would not prevail. Only with the Representation of the People Act 1884 did a majority of the males get the vote.

=== United States ===
The American Revolution (1765–1783) created the United States. The new Constitution established a relatively strong federal national government that included an executive, a national judiciary, and a bicameral Congress that represented states in the Senate and the population in the House of Representatives. In many fields, it was a success ideologically in the sense that a true republic was established that never had a single dictator, but voting rights were initially restricted to white male property owners (about 6% of the population). Slavery was not abolished in the Southern states until the constitutional Amendments of the Reconstruction era following the American Civil War (1861–1865). The provision of Civil Rights for African-Americans to overcome post-Reconstruction Jim Crow segregation in the South was achieved in the 1960s.

== Causes and factors ==
There is considerable debate about the factors which affect (e.g., promote or limit) democratization. Factors discussed include economic, political, cultural, individual agents and their choices, international and historical.

=== Economic factors ===
==== Economic development and modernization theory ====
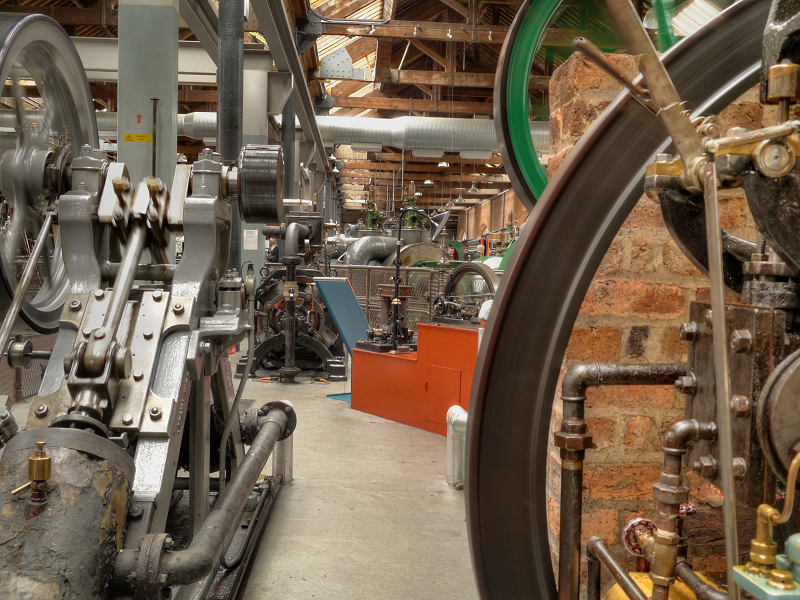
Industrialization was seen by many theorists as a driver of democratization.

Scholars such as Seymour Martin Lipset; Carles Boix, Susan Stokes, Dietrich Rueschemeyer, Evelyne Stephens, and John Stephens argue that economic development increases the likelihood of democratization. Initially argued by Lipset in 1959, this has subsequently been referred to as modernization theory. According to Daniel Treisman, there is "a strong and consistent relationship between higher income and both democratization and democratic survival in the medium term (10–20 years), but not necessarily in shorter time windows." Robert Dahl argued that market economies provided favorable conditions for democratic institutions.

A higher GDP/capita correlates with democracy. Some ^{Who?} claim the wealthiest democracies have never been observed to fall into authoritarianism. The rise of Hitler and of the Nazis in Weimar Germany can be seen as an obvious counter-example. Although, in early 1930s, Germany was already an advanced economy. By that time, the country was also living in a state of economic crisis virtually since the first World War (in the 1910s). A crisis that was eventually worsened by the effects of the Great Depression. There is also the general observation that democracy was very rare before the industrial revolution. Empirical research thus led many to believe that economic development either increases chances for a transition to democracy, or helps newly established democracies consolidate.

One study finds that economic development prompts democratization but only in the medium run (10–20 years). This is because development may entrench the incumbent leader while making it more difficult for him deliver the state to a son or trusted aide when he exits. However, the debate about whether democracy is a consequence of wealth is far from conclusive.

Another study suggests that economic development depends on the political stability of a country to promote democracy. Clark, Robert and Golder, in their reformulation of Albert Hirschman's model of Exit, Voice and Loyalty, explain how it is not the increase of wealth in a country per se which influences a democratization process, but rather the changes in the socio-economic structures that come together with the increase of wealth. They explain how these structural changes have been called out to be one of the main reasons several European countries became democratic. When their socioeconomic structures shifted because modernization made the agriculture sector more efficient, bigger investments of time and resources were used for the manufacture and service sectors. In England, for example, members of the gentry began investing more in commercial activities that allowed them to become economically more important for the state. These new kinds of productive activities came with new economic power. Their assets became more difficult for the state to count and hence, more difficult to tax. Because of this, predation was no longer possible and the state had to negotiate with the new economic elites to extract revenue. A sustainable bargain had to be reached because the state became more dependent on its citizens remaining loyal, and with this, citizens now had the leverage to be taken into account in the decision making process for the country.

Adam Przeworski and Fernando Limongi argue that while economic development makes democracies less likely to turn authoritarian, there is insufficient evidence to conclude that development causes democratization (turning an authoritarian state into a democracy). Economic development can boost public support for authoritarian regimes in the short-to-medium term. Andrew J. Nathan argues that China is a problematic case for the thesis that economic development causes democratization. Michael Miller finds that development increases the likelihood of "democratization in regimes that are fragile and unstable, but makes this fragility less likely to begin with."

There is research to suggest that greater urbanization, through various pathways, contributes to democratization. Numerous scholars and political thinkers have linked a large middle class to the emergence and sustenance of democracy, whereas others have challenged this relationship. In "Non-Modernization" (2022), Daron Acemoglu and James A. Robinson argue that modernization theory cannot account for various paths of political development "because it posits a link between economics and politics that is not conditional on institutions and culture and that presumes a definite endpoint—for example, an 'end of history'." A meta-analysis by Gerardo L. Munck of research on Lipset's argument shows that a majority of studies do not support the thesis that higher levels of economic development leads to more democracy. A 2024 study linked industrialization to democratization, arguing that large-scale employment in manufacturing made mass mobilization easier to occur and harder to repress.

==== Capital mobility ====
Theories on causes to democratization such as economic development focuses on the aspect of gaining capital. Capital mobility focuses on the movement of money across borders of countries, different financial instruments, and the corresponding restrictions. In the past, there have been multiple theories as to what the relationship is between capital mobility and democratization.

The "doomsway view" is that capital mobility is an inherent threat to underdeveloped democracies by the worsening of economic inequalities, favoring the interests of powerful elites and external actors over the rest of society. This might lead to depending on money from outside, therefore affecting the economic situation in other countries. Sylvia Maxfield argues that a bigger demand for transparency in both the private and public sectors by some investors can contribute to a strengthening of democratic institutions and can encourage democratic consolidation.

A 2016 study found that preferential trade agreements can increase democratization of a country, especially trading with other democracies. A 2020 study found increased trade between democracies reduces democratic backsliding, while trade between democracies and autocracies reduces democratization of the autocracies. Trade and capital mobility often involve international organizations, such as the International Monetary Fund (IMF), World Bank, and World Trade Organization (WTO), which can condition financial assistance or trade agreements on democratic reforms.

==== Classes, cleavages and alliances ====
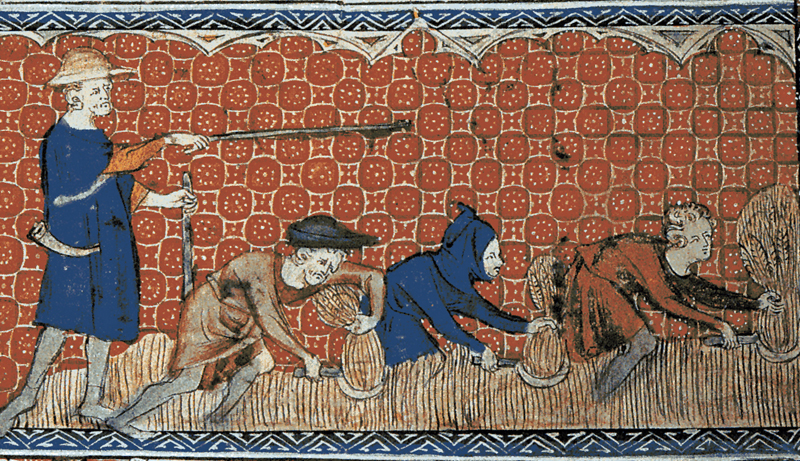
Theorists such as Barrington Moore Jr. argued that the roots of democratization could be found in the relationship between lords and peasants in agrarian societies.

Sociologist Barrington Moore Jr., in his influential Social Origins of Dictatorship and Democracy (1966), argues that the distribution of power among classes – the peasantry, the bourgeoisie and the landed aristocracy – and the nature of alliances between classes determined whether democratic, authoritarian or communist revolutions occurred. Moore also argued there were at least "three routes to the modern world" – the liberal democratic, the fascist, and the communist – each deriving from the timing of industrialization and the social structure at the time of transition. Thus, Moore challenged modernization theory, by stressing that there was not one path to the modern world and that economic development did not always bring about democracy.

Many authors have questioned parts of Moore's arguments. Dietrich Rueschemeyer, Evelyne Stephens, and John D. Stephens, in Capitalist Development and Democracy (1992), raise questions about Moore's analysis of the role of the bourgeoisie in democratization. Eva Bellin argues that under certain circumstances, the bourgeoisie and labor are more likely to favor democratization, but less so under other circumstances. Samuel Valenzuela argues that, counter to Moore's view, the landed elite supported democratization in Chile. A comprehensive assessment conducted by James Mahoney concludes that "Moore's specific hypotheses about democracy and authoritarianism receive only limited and highly conditional support."

A 2020 study linked democratization to the mechanization of agriculture: as landed elites became less reliant on the repression of agricultural workers, they became less hostile to democracy. According to political scientist David Stasavage, representative government is "more likely to occur when a society is divided across multiple political cleavages." A 2021 study found that constitutions that emerge through pluralism (reflecting distinct segments of society) are more likely to induce liberal democracy (at least, in the short term).

=== Political-economic factors ===
==== Rulers' need for taxation ====
Robert Bates and Donald Lien, as well as David Stasavage, have argued that rulers' need for taxes gave asset-owning elites the bargaining power to demand a say on public policy, thus giving rise to democratic institutions. Montesquieu argued that the mobility of commerce meant that rulers had to bargain with merchants in order to tax them, otherwise they would leave the country or hide their commercial activities. Stasavage argues that the small size and backwardness of European states, as well as the weakness of European rulers, after the fall of the Roman Empire meant that European rulers had to obtain consent from their population to govern effectively.

According to Clark, Golder, and Golder, an application of Albert O. Hirschman's exit, voice, and loyalty model is that if individuals have plausible exit options, then a government may be more likely to democratize. James C. Scott argues that governments may find it difficult to claim a sovereignty over a population when that population is in motion. Scott additionally asserts that exit may not solely include physical exit from the territory of a coercive state, but can include a number of adaptive responses to coercion that make it more difficult for states to claim sovereignty over a population. These responses can include planting crops that are more difficult for states to count, or tending livestock that are more mobile. In fact, the entire political arrangement of a state is a result of individuals adapting to the environment, and making a choice as to whether or not to stay in a territory. If people are free to move, then the exit, voice, and loyalty model predicts that a state will have to be of that population representative, and appease the populace in order to prevent them from leaving. If individuals have plausible exit options then they are better able to constrain a government's arbitrary behaviour through threat of exit.

==== Inequality and democracy ====
Daron Acemoglu and James A. Robinson argued that the relationship between social equality and democratic transition is complicated: People have less incentive to revolt in an egalitarian society (for example, Singapore), so the likelihood of democratization is lower. In a highly unequal society (for example, South Africa under Apartheid), the redistribution of wealth and power in a democracy would be so harmful to elites that these would do everything to prevent democratization. Democratization is more likely to emerge somewhere in the middle, in the countries, whose elites offer concessions because (1) they consider the threat of a revolution credible and (2) the cost of the concessions is not too high. This expectation is in line with the empirical research showing that democracy is more stable in egalitarian societies.

Other approaches to the relationship between inequality and democracy have been presented by Carles Boix, Stephan Haggard Robert Kaufman,Ben Ansell, and David Samuels. In their 2019 book The Narrow Corridor and a 2022 study in the American Political Science Review, Acemoglu and Robinson argue that the nature of the relationship between elites and society determine whether stable democracy emerges. When elites are overly dominant, despotic states emerge. When society is overly dominant, weak states emerge. When elites and society are evenly balance, inclusive states emerge.

==== Natural resources ====
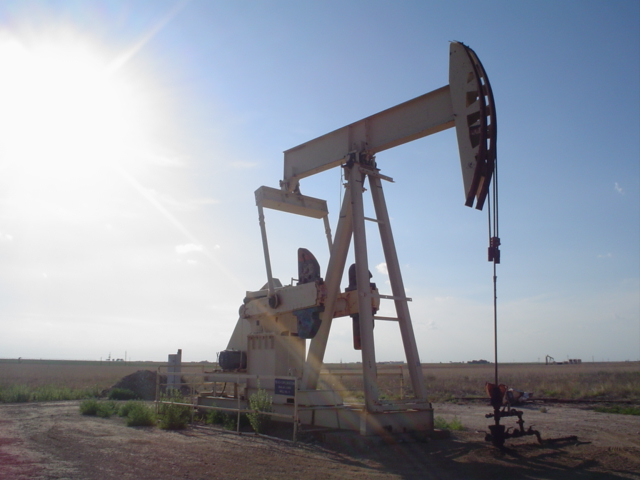
The abundance of oil is sometimes seen as a curse.

Research shows that oil wealth lowers levels of democracy and strengthens autocratic rule. According to Michael Ross, petroleum is the sole resource that has "been consistently correlated with less democracy and worse institutions" and is the "key variable in the vast majority of the studies" identifying some type of resource curse effect. A 2014 meta-analysis confirms the negative impact of oil wealth on democratization.

Thad Dunning proposes a plausible explanation for Ecuador's return to democracy that contradicts the conventional wisdom that natural resource rents encourage authoritarian governments. Dunning proposes that there are situations where natural resource rents, such as those acquired through oil, reduce the risk of distributive or social policies to the elite because the state has other sources of revenue to finance this kind of policies that is not the elite wealth or income. And in countries plagued with high inequality, which was the case of Ecuador in the 1970s, the result would be a higher likelihood of democratization.

In 1972, the military coup had overthrown the government in large part because of the fears of elites that redistribution would take place. That same year, oil became an increasing financial source for the country. Although the rents were used to finance the military, the eventual second oil boom of 1979 ran parallel to the country's re-democratization. Ecuador's re-democratization can then be attributed, as argued by Dunning, to the large increase of oil rents, which enabled not only a surge in public spending but placated the fears of redistribution that had grappled the elite circles. The exploitation of Ecuador's resource rent enabled the government to implement price and wage policies that benefited citizens at no cost to the elite and allowed for a smooth transition and growth of democratic institutions.

The thesis that oil and other natural resources have a negative impact on democracy has been challenged by historian Stephen Haber and political scientist Victor Menaldo in a widely cited article in the American Political Science Review (2011). Haber and Menaldo argue that "natural resource reliance is not an exogenous variable" and find that when tests of the relationship between natural resources and democracy take this point into account "increases in resource reliance are not associated with authoritarianism."

=== Cultural factors ===
==== Values and religion ====
It is claimed by some that certain cultures are simply more conducive to democratic values than others. This view is likely to be ethnocentric. Typically, it is Western culture which is cited as "best suited" to democracy, with other cultures portrayed as containing values which make democracy difficult or undesirable. This argument is sometimes used by undemocratic regimes to justify their failure to implement democratic reforms. Today, however, there are many non-Western democracies. Examples include India, Japan, Indonesia, Namibia, Botswana, Taiwan, and South Korea. Research finds that "Western-educated leaders significantly and substantively improve a country's democratization prospects".

Huntington presented an influential, but also controversial arguments about Confucianism and Islam. Huntington held that "In practice Confucian or Confucian-influenced societies have been inhospitable to democracy." He also held that "Islamic doctrine ... contains elements that may be both congenial and uncongenial to democracy," but generally thought that Islam was an obstacle to democratization. In contrast, Alfred Stepan was more optimistic about the compatibility of different religions and democracy.

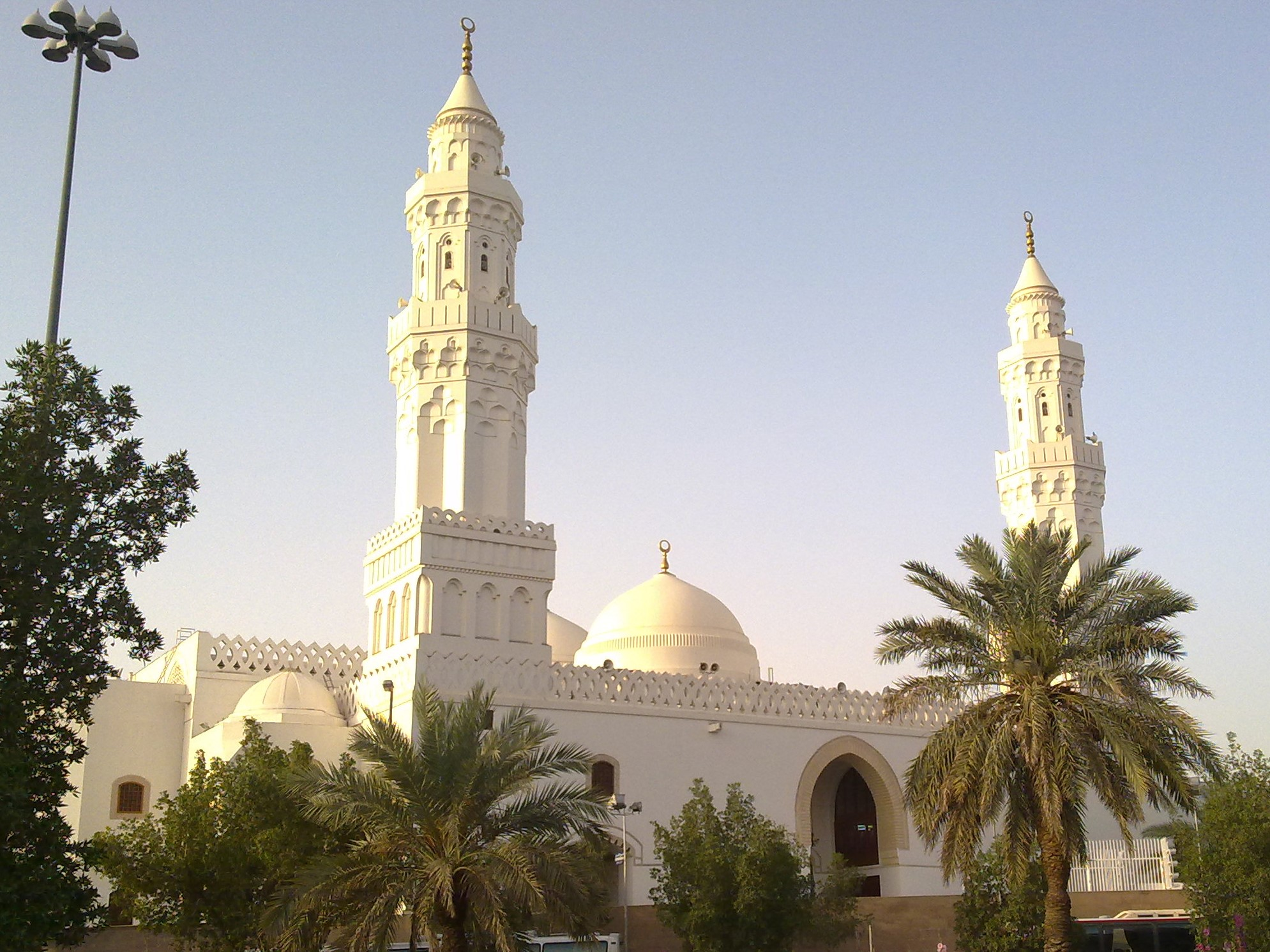
The compatibility of Islam and democracy continues to be a focus of discussion; the image depicts a mosque in Medina, Saudi Arabia.

Steven Fish and Robert Barro have linked Islam to undemocratic outcomes. However, Michael Ross argues that the lack of democracies in some parts of the Muslim world has more to do with the adverse effects of the resource curse than Islam. Lisa Blaydes and Eric Chaney have linked the democratic divergence between the West and the Middle-East to the reliance on mamluks (slave soldiers) by Muslim rulers whereas European rulers had to rely on local elites for military forces, thus giving those elites bargaining power to push for representative government.

Robert Dahl argued, in On Democracy, that countries with a "democratic political culture" were more prone for democratization and democratic survival. He also argued that cultural homogeneity and smallness contribute to democratic survival. Other scholars have however challenged the notion that small states and homogeneity strengthen democracy. A 2012 study found that areas in Africa with Protestant missionaries were more likely to become stable democracies. A 2020 study failed to replicate those findings.

Sirianne Dahlum and Carl Henrik Knutsen offer a test of the Ronald Inglehart and Christian Welzel revised version of modernization theory, which focuses on cultural traits triggered by economic development that are presumed to be conducive to democratization. They find "no empirical support" for the Inglehart and Welzel thesis and conclude that "self-expression values do not enhance democracy levels or democratization chances, and neither do they stabilize existing democracies."

==== Education ====
It has long been theorized that education promotes stable and democratic societies. Research shows that education leads to greater political tolerance, increases the likelihood of political participation and reduces inequality. One study finds "that increases in levels of education improve levels of democracy and that the democratizing effect of education is more intense in poor countries".

It is commonly claimed that democracy and democratization were important drivers of the expansion of primary education around the world. However, new evidence from historical education trends challenges this assertion. An analysis of historical student enrollment rates for 109 countries from 1820 to 2010 finds no support for the claim that democratization increased access to primary education around the world. It is true that transitions to democracy often coincided with an acceleration in the expansion of primary education, but the same acceleration was observed in countries that remained non-democratic. Wider adoption of voting advice applications can lead to increased education on politics and increased voter turnout.

==== Social capital and civil society ====
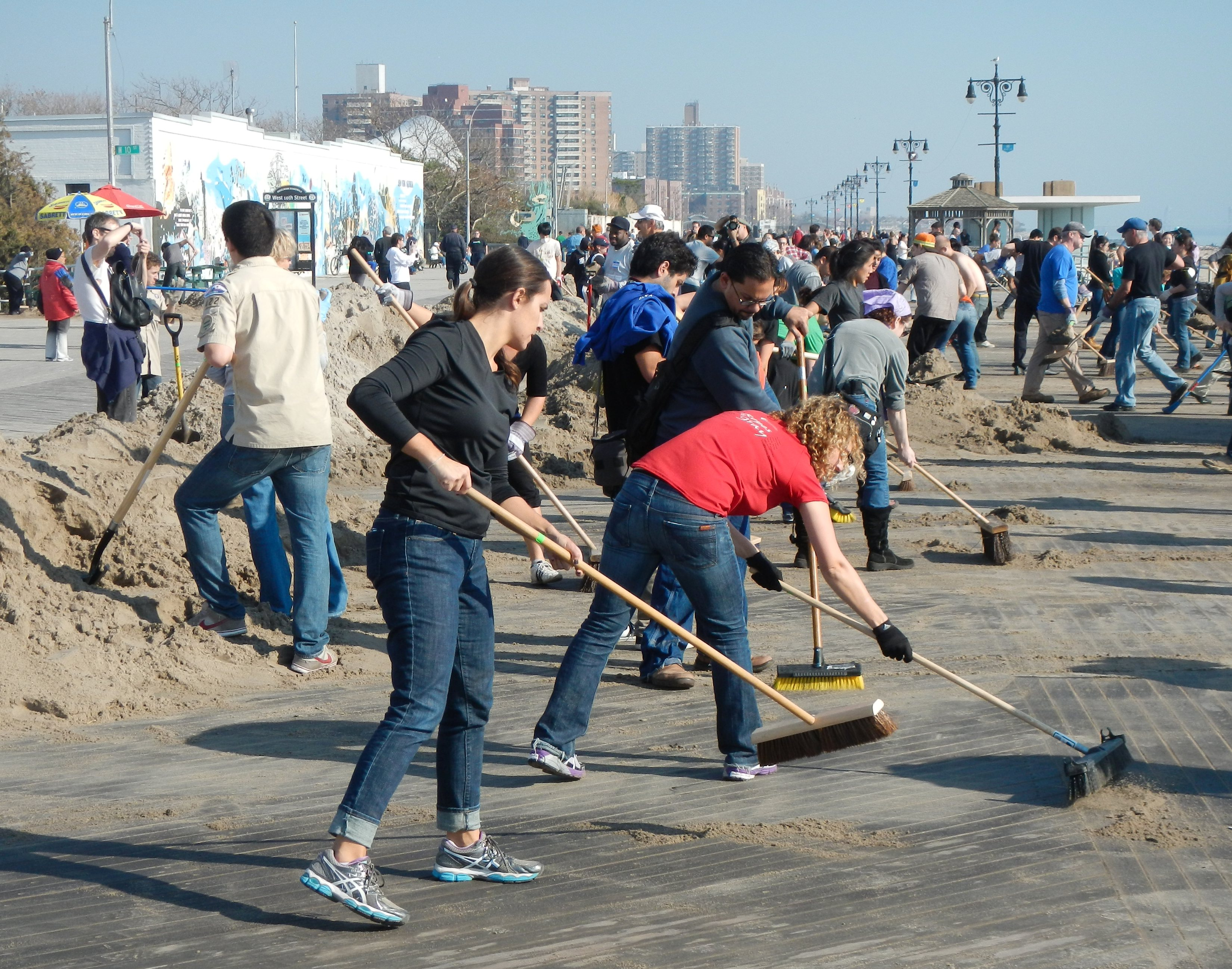
Civic engagement, including volunteering, is conducive to democratization. These volunteers are cleaning up after the 2012 Hurricane Sandy.

Civil society refers to a collection of non-governmental organizations and institutions that advance the interests, priorities and will of citizens. Social capital refers to features of social life—networks, norms, and trust—that allow individuals to act together to pursue shared objectives. Robert Putnam argues that certain characteristics make societies more likely to have cultures of civic engagement that lead to more participatory democracies. According to Putnam, communities with denser horizontal networks of civic association are able to better build the "norms of trust, reciprocity, and civic engagement" that lead to democratization and well-functioning participatory democracies. By contrasting communities in Northern Italy, which had dense horizontal networks, to communities in Southern Italy, which had more vertical networks and patron-client relations, Putnam asserts that the latter never built the culture of civic engagement that some deem as necessary for successful democratization. The anthropologist Joseph Henrich makes a complementary argument but one that emphasizes not just the importance of how various kinds of associations create bridging social capital but also the importance of the absence of intensive kin-based institutions.

Sheri Berman has rebutted Putnam's theory that civil society contributes to democratization, writing that in the case of the Weimar Republic, civil society facilitated the rise of the Nazi Party. According to Berman, Germany's democratization after World War I allowed for a renewed development in the country's civil society; however, Berman argues that this vibrant civil society eventually weakened democracy within Germany as it exacerbated existing social divisions due to the creation of exclusionary community organizations. Subsequent empirical research and theoretical analysis has lent support for Berman's argument. Yale University political scientist Daniel Mattingly argues civil society in China helps the authoritarian regime in China to cement control. Clark, M. Golder, and S. Golder also argue that despite many believing democratization requires a civic culture, empirical evidence produced by several reanalyses of past studies suggest this claim is only partially supported. Philippe C. Schmitter also asserts that the existence of civil society is not a prerequisite for the transition to democracy, but rather democratization is usually followed by the resurrection of civil society (even if it did not exist previously).

Research indicates that democracy protests are associated with democratization. According to a study by Freedom House, in 67 countries where dictatorships have fallen since 1972, nonviolent civic resistance was a strong influence over 70 percent of the time. In these transitions, changes were catalyzed not through foreign invasion, and only rarely through armed revolt or voluntary elite-driven reforms, but overwhelmingly by democratic civil society organizations utilizing nonviolent action and other forms of civil resistance, such as strikes, boycotts, civil disobedience, and mass protests. A 2016 study found that about a quarter of all cases of democracy protests between 1989 and 2011 lead to democratization.

=== Theories based on political agents and choices ===
==== Elite-opposition negotiations and contingency ====
Scholars such as Dankwart A. Rustow, Guillermo O'Donnell and Philippe C. Schmitter in their classic Transitions from Authoritarian Rule: Tentative Conclusions about Uncertain Democracies (1986), argued against the notion that there are structural "big" causes of democratization. These scholars instead emphasize how the democratization process occurs in a more contingent manner that depends on the characteristics and circumstances of the elites who ultimately oversee the shift from authoritarianism to democracy. O'Donnell and Schmitter proposed a strategic choice approach to transitions to democracy that highlighted how they were driven by the decisions of different actors in response to a core set of dilemmas. The analysis centered on the interaction among four actors: the hard-liners and soft-liners who belonged to the incumbent authoritarian regime, and the moderate and radical oppositions against the regime. This book not only became the point of reference for a burgeoning academic literature on democratic transitions, it was also read widely by political activists engaged in actual struggles to achieve democracy. Adam Przeworski, in Democracy and the Market (1991), offered the first analysis of the interaction between rulers and opposition in transitions to democracy using rudimentary game theory. and he emphasizes the interdependence of political and economic transformations.

==== Elite-driven democratization ====
Scholars have argued that processes of democratization may be elite-driven or driven by the authoritarian incumbents as a way for those elites to retain power amid popular demands for representative government. If the costs of repression are higher than the costs of giving away power, authoritarians may opt for democratization and inclusive institutions. According to a 2020 study, authoritarian-led democratization is more likely to lead to lasting democracy in cases when the party strength of the authoritarian incumbent is high. However, Michael Albertus and Victor Menaldo argue that democratizing rules implemented by outgoing authoritarians may distort democracy in favor of the outgoing authoritarian regime and its supporters, resulting in "bad" institutions that are hard to get rid of. According to Michael K. Miller, elite-driven democratization is particularly likely in the wake of major violent shocks (either domestic or international) which provide openings to opposition actors to the authoritarian regime. Dan Slater and Joseph Wong argue that dictators in Asia chose to implement democratic reforms when they were in positions of strength in order to retain and revitalize their power.

According to a study by political scientist Daniel Treisman, influential theories of democratization posit that autocrats "deliberately choose to share or surrender power. They do so to prevent revolution, motivate citizens to fight wars, incentivize governments to provide public goods, outbid elite rivals, or limit factional violence." His study shows that in many cases, "democratization occurred not because incumbent elites chose it but because, in trying to prevent it, they made mistakes that weakened their hold on power. Common mistakes include: calling elections or starting military conflicts, only to lose them; ignoring popular unrest and being overthrown; initiating limited reforms that get out of hand; and selecting a covert democrat as leader. These mistakes reflect well-known cognitive biases such as overconfidence and the illusion of control."

Sharun Mukand and Dani Rodrik dispute that elite-driven democratization produce liberal democracy. They argue that low levels of inequality and weak identity cleavages are necessary for liberal democracy to emerge. A 2020 study by several political scientists from German universities found that democratization through bottom-up peaceful protests led to higher levels of democracy and democratic stability than democratization prompted by elites. The three dictatorship types, monarchy, civilian and military have different approaches to democratization as a result of their individual goals. Monarchic and civilian dictatorships seek to remain in power indefinitely through hereditary rule in the case of monarchs or through oppression in the case of civilian dictators. A military dictatorship seizes power to act as a caretaker government to replace what they consider a flawed civilian government. Military dictatorships are more likely to transition to democracy because at the onset, they are meant to be stop-gap solutions while a new acceptable government forms. Research suggests that the threat of civil conflict encourages regimes to make democratic concessions. A 2016 study found that drought-induced riots in Sub-Saharan Africa lead regimes, fearing conflict, to make democratic concessions.

==== Scrambled constituencies ====
Mancur Olson theorizes that the process of democratization occurs when elites are unable to reconstitute an autocracy. Olson suggests that this occurs when constituencies or identity groups are mixed within a geographic region. He asserts that this mixed geographic constituencies requires elites to for democratic and representative institutions to control the region, and to limit the power of competing elite groups.

==== Death or ouster of dictator ====
One analysis found that "Compared with other forms of leadership turnover in autocracies—such as coups, elections, or term limits—which lead to regime collapse about half of the time, the death of a dictator is remarkably inconsequential. ... of the 79 dictators who have died in office (1946–2014)... in the vast majority (92%) of cases, the regime persists after the autocrat's death."

=== Women's suffrage ===
One of the critiques of Huntington's periodization is that it doesn't give enough weight to universal suffrage. Pamela Paxton argues that once women's suffrage is taken into account, the data reveal "a long, continuous democratization period from 1893–1958, with only war-related reversals."

=== International factors ===
==== War and national security ====
Jeffrey Herbst, in his paper "War and the State in Africa" (1990), explains how democratization in European states was achieved through political development fostered by war-making and these "lessons from the case of Europe show that war is an important cause of state formation that is missing in Africa today." Herbst writes that war and the threat of invasion by neighbors caused European state to more efficiently collect revenue, forced leaders to improve administrative capabilities, and fostered state unification and a sense of national identity (a common, powerful association between the state and its citizens). Herbst writes that in Africa and elsewhere in the non-European world "states are developing in a fundamentally new environment" because they mostly "gained Independence without having to resort to combat and have not faced a security threat since independence." Herbst notes that the strongest non-European states, South Korea and Taiwan, are "largely 'warfare' states that have been molded, in part, by the near constant threat of external aggression." Elizabeth Kier has challenged claims that total war prompts democratization, showing in the cases of the UK and Italy during World War I that the policies adopted by the Italian government prompted a fascist backlash whereas UK government policies towards labor undermined broader democratization.

==== War and peace ====
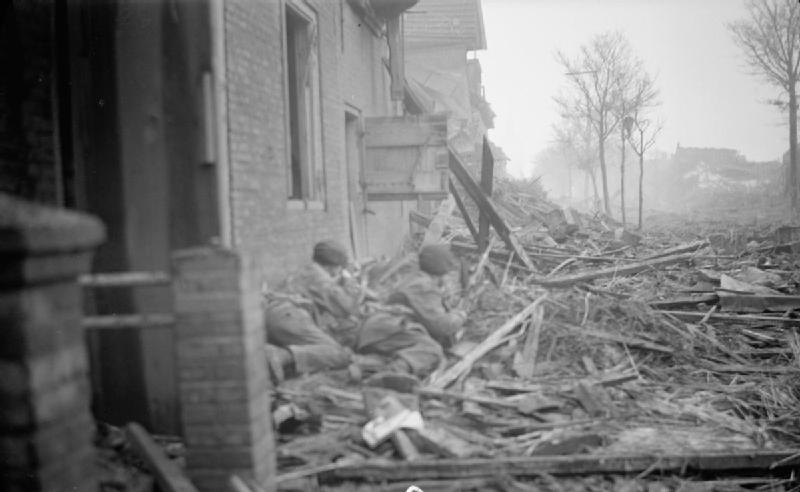
Two British Marine Commandos take protection behind debris during the capture of Walcheren Island during World War II. The link between war and democratization has been a focus of some theories.

Wars may contribute to the state-building that precedes a transition to democracy, but war is mainly a serious obstacle to democratization. While adherents of the democratic peace theory believe that democracy causes peace, the territorial peace theory makes the opposite claim that peace causes democracy. In fact, war and territorial threats to a country are likely to increase authoritarianism and lead to autocracy. This is supported by historical evidence showing that in almost all cases, peace has come before democracy. A number of scholars have argued that there is little support for the hypothesis that democracy causes peace, but strong evidence for the opposite hypothesis that peace leads to democracy.

Christian Welzel's human empowerment theory posits that existential security leads to emancipative cultural values and support for a democratic political organization. This is in agreement with theories based on evolutionary psychology. The regality theory finds that people develop a psychological preference for a strong leader and an authoritarian form of government in situations of war or perceived collective danger. On the other hand, people will support egalitarian values and a preference for democracy in situations of peace and safety. The consequence of this is that a society will develop in the direction of autocracy and an authoritarian government when people perceive collective danger, while the development in the democratic direction requires collective safety.

==== International institutions ====
A number of studies have found that international institutions have helped facilitate democratization. Thomas Risse wrote in 2009, "there is a consensus in the literature on Eastern Europe that the EU membership perspective had a huge anchoring effects for the new democracies." Scholars have also linked NATO expansion with playing a role in democratization. international forces can significantly affect democratization. Global forces like the diffusion of democratic ideas and pressure from international financial institutions to democratize have led to democratization.

==== Promotion, foreign influence, and intervention ====
The European Union has contributed to the spread of democracy, in particular by encouraging democratic reforms in aspiring member states. Thomas Risse wrote in 2009, "there is a consensus in the literature on Eastern Europe that the EU membership perspective had a huge anchoring effects for the new democracies." Steven Levitsky and Lucan Way have argued that close ties to the West increased the likelihood of democratization after the end of the Cold War, whereas states with weak ties to the West adopted competitive authoritarian regimes. A 2002 study found that membership in regional organizations "is correlated with transitions to democracy during the period from 1950 to 1992." A 2004 study found no evidence that foreign aid led to democratization.

Democracies have sometimes been imposed by military intervention, for example in Japan and Germany after World War II. In other cases, decolonization sometimes facilitated the establishment of democracies that were soon replaced by authoritarian regimes. For example, Syria, after gaining independence from French mandatory control at the beginning of the Cold War, failed to consolidate its democracy, so it eventually collapsed and was replaced by a Ba'athist dictatorship. Robert Dahl argued in On Democracy that foreign interventions contributed to democratic failures, citing Soviet interventions in Central and Eastern Europe and U.S. interventions in Latin America. However, the delegitimization of empires contributed to the emergence of democracy as former colonies gained independence and implemented democracy.

==== Geographic factors ====
Some scholars link the emergence and sustenance of democracies to areas with access to the sea, which tends to increase the mobility of people, goods, capital, and ideas.

=== Historical factors ===
==== Historical legacies ====
In seeking to explain why North America developed stable democracies and Latin America did not, Seymour Martin Lipset, in The Democratic Century (2004), holds that the reason is that the initial patterns of colonization, the subsequent process of economic incorporation of the new colonies, and the wars of independence differ. The divergent histories of Britain and Iberia are seen as creating different cultural legacies that affected the prospects of democracy. A related argument is presented by James A. Robinson in "Critical Junctures and Developmental Paths" (2022).

=== Sequencing and causality ===
Scholars have discussed whether the order in which things happen helps or hinders the process of democratization. An early discussion occurred in the 1960s and 1970s. Dankwart Rustow argued that "'the most effective sequence' is the pursuit of national unity, government authority, and political equality, in that order." Eric Nordlinger and Samuel Huntington stressed "the importance of developing effective governmental institutions before the emergence of mass participation in politics." Robert Dahl, in Polyarchy: Participation and Opposition (1971), held that the "commonest sequence among the older and more stable polyarchies has been some approximation of the ... path [in which] competitive politics preceded expansion in participation."

In the 2010s, the discussion focused on the impact of the sequencing between state building and democratization. Francis Fukuyama, in Political Order and Political Decay (2014), echoes Huntington's "state-first" argument and holds that those "countries in which democracy preceded modern state-building have had much greater problems achieving high-quality governance." This view has been supported by Sheri Berman, who offers a sweeping overview of European history and concludes that "sequencing matters" and that "without strong states...liberal democracy is difficult if not impossible to achieve."

However, this state-first thesis has been challenged. Relying on a comparison of Denmark and Greece, and quantitative research on 180 countries across 1789–2019, Haakon Gjerløw, Carl Henrik Knutsen, Tore Wig, and Matthew C. Wilson, in One Road to Riches? (2022), "find little evidence to support the stateness-first argument." Based on a comparison of European and Latin American countries, Sebastián Mazzuca and Gerardo Munck, in A Middle-Quality Institutional Trap (2021), argue that counter to the state-first thesis, the "starting point of political developments is less important than whether the State–democracy relationship is a virtuous cycle, triggering causal mechanisms that reinforce each." In sequences of democratization for many countries, Morrison et al. found elections as the most frequent first element of the sequence of democratization but found this ordering does not necessarily predict successful democratization. The democratic peace theory claims that democracy causes peace, while the territorial peace theory claims that peace causes democracy.

== Sources ==
- Casanova, Julián; Gil Andrés, Carlos (2014). Twentieth-century Spain. A History. Translated by Douch, Martin. Cambridge University Press. ISBN 978-1-107-60267-0. OCLC 870438787.
- Colomer Rubio, Juan Carlos (2012). "Todo está casi perdonado. A propósito de la Transición, debate historiográfico y propuestas metodológicas" [All is almost forgiven. Regarding the Transition, historiographic debate and methodological proposals] (PDF). Stvdivm. Revista de Humanidades (in Spanish). 18. ISSN 1137-8417.
- Katsiaficas, George (2012). Asia's Unknown Uprisings, Volume 1: South Korean Social Movements in the 20th Century. PM Press. ISBN 978-1-60486-457-1.
- Orme, John (1988). "Dismounting the Tiger: Lessons from Four Liberalizations". Political Science Quarterly. 103 (2): 245–265. doi:10.2307/2151183. ISSN 0032-3195. JSTOR 2151183.
- Ortuño Anaya, Pilar (2005). Los socialistas europeos y la transición española (1959–1977) [European socialists and the Spanish transition (1959–1977)] (in Spanish). Madrid: Marcial Pons. p. 22. ISBN 84-95379-88-0.
- Tremlett, Giles (2008). Ghosts of Spain. Travels through Spain and its silent past. Bloomsbury. ISBN 978-0-8027-1674-3.
