= Panamerican Congress =

- "Solidarity among peoples. Sovereignty among nations."
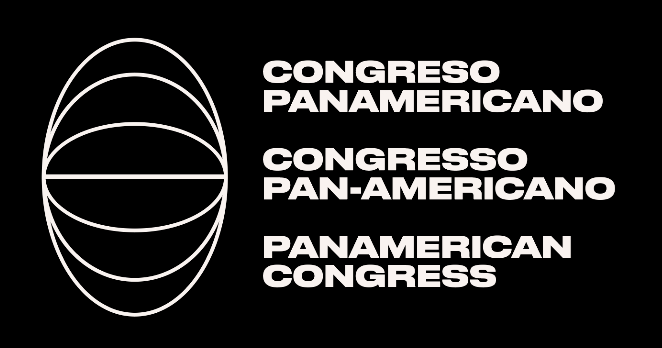
- Founded: 2024
- Leader: David R. K. Adler; Giorgio Jackson
- Website: panamericancongress.org

The Panamerican Congress is a parliamentary forum that brings together more than one hundred legislators, former presidents, ministers, and leaders from 15 countries across the Americas.

The Congress has its origins in an August 2023 delegation of progressive U.S. lawmakers to Latin America, led by Alexandria Ocasio-Cortez, organized by David R. K. Adler, and sponsored by the Center for Economic and Policy Research (CEPR).

The trips were undertaken with the express intention of establishing a connection between U.S. politicians and the rest of the region, and strengthening relations with progressive governments in Latin America.

Alexandria Ocasio-Cortez stated that:

"The United States needs to publicly acknowledge the harm we have caused through interventionist and exploitative policies and chart a new course based on trust and mutual respect."

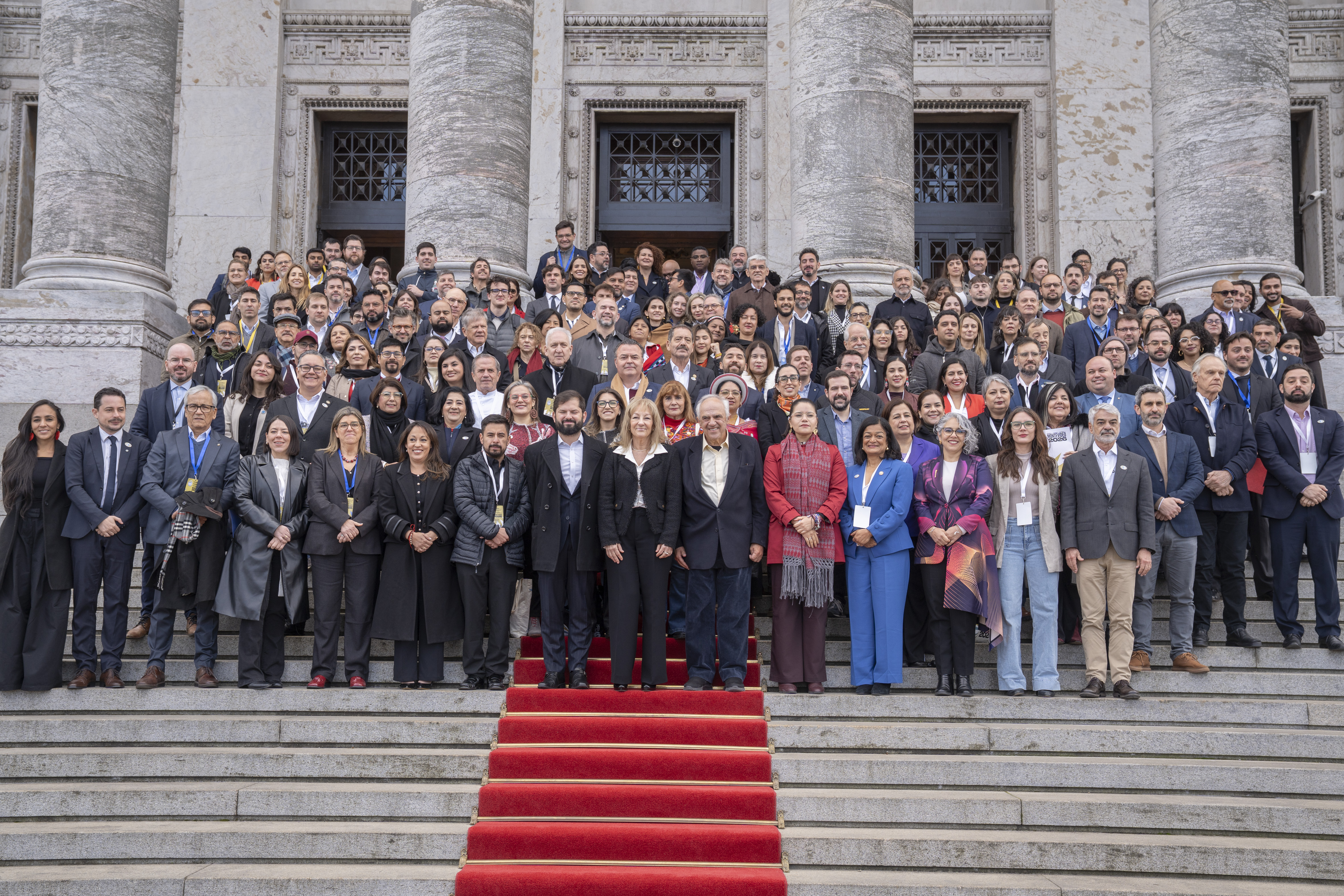
Participants of the 2026 Congress in Montevideo, Uruguay, August 21, 2026

The organization holds annual meetings—which began in Bogotá in August 2024 at the initiative of Colombian President Gustavo Petro—to bring together progressive legislators from North, Central, and South America and the Caribbean. The aim is to build a community by forging relationships among regional leaders who have never met before; to develop an agenda by identifying areas for hemispheric cooperation to address inequalities, injustices, and urgent regional issues; and to devise a strategy by sharing best practices and successful policy tools for implementation in their respective legislatures.

== Editions ==
=== 2024 ===
The first edition took place in Bogotá, Colombia, from August 3-5, 2024, and was attended by 40 lawmakers from 20 progressive political parties across North, Central, and South America—including the Democratic Party (USA), Morena (Mexico), and the Historic Pact (Colombia). Participants included Luis Gilberto Murillo and Clara López Obregón from Colombia; Delia Ramírez and Greg Casar from the United States; Samuel Pérez and Sonia Gutiérrez from Guatemala; Celeste Ascencio and Beatriz Mojica from Mexico; Epsy Campbell, former Vice President of Costa Rica; Luciene Cavalcante from Brazil; and Ericka Ñanco from Chile.

=== 2025 ===
The second meeting took place from August 1–3, 2025, in Mexico City, Mexico, with the participation of officials, legislators, and activists from 12 countries, and was inaugurated by Mexican President Claudia Sheinbaum.

The Congress opened at the historic Casona de Xicoténcatl—the former seat of the Senate of the Republic—and the opening remarks were delivered by Mexican Senator Celeste Ascencio.

Special guests included Epsy Campbell and David Comissiong from Barbados, Álvaro García Linera from Bolivia, and Jennifer Hassum from Canada.

The meeting resulted in the issuance of the Cuauhtémoc Declaration, which calls for democratizing power, fostering shared prosperity, generating abundant green energy, achieving substantive equality, upholding sovereign equality, and forging solidarity that transcends borders.

=== 2026 ===
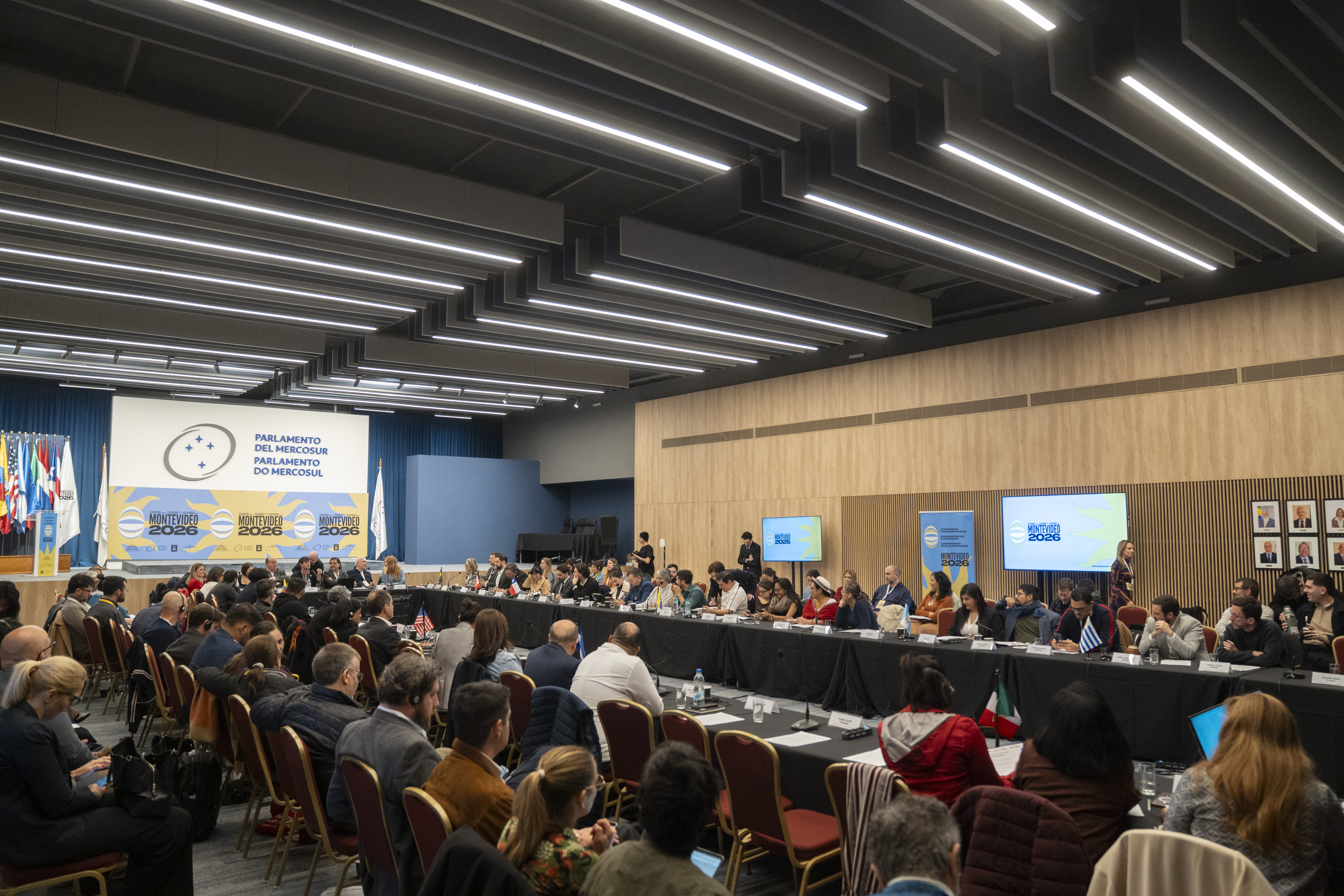
One of the working groups during the 2026 Congress

The third meeting took place in Montevideo, Uruguay, from August 21–23, 2026, and comprised an opening ceremony at the Legislative Palace, a public event at the Solís Theatre, and a closing session at the Mercosur Parliament (Parlasur) building.

It brought together 150 progressive leaders from 15 countries across the continent, including parliamentarians and former presidents. Discussions were organized around four thematic pillars: peace, security, and multilateralism; sustainable economic development and regional integration; digital sovereignty and artificial intelligence; and well-being and care for the majority.

The event was held with the backing of the Frente Amplio (Broad Front), Uruguay's alliance of left-wing political forces.

Participants included, among others, Vice President Carolina Cosse, Montevideo Mayor Mario Bergara, Alejandro "Pacha" Sánchez, Lucía Topolansky, Constanza Moreira, and Bettiana Díaz from Uruguay; former President Gabriel Boric, Camila Vallejo, and Jeanette Jara from Chile; Governor Alex Kicillof from Argentina; former President Ernesto Samper and María José Pizarro from Colombia; Humberto Costa of Brazil's Workers' Party; Carolina Rangel, General Secretary of Morena's National Executive Committee, from Mexico; Rixi Moncada from Honduras; Verónica Iñiguez from Ecuador; and Pramila Jayapal, Darializa Ávila Chevalier, and Jesús "Chuy" García from the United States.
