= David R. K. Adler =

French-American political economist and activist

David R.K. Adler
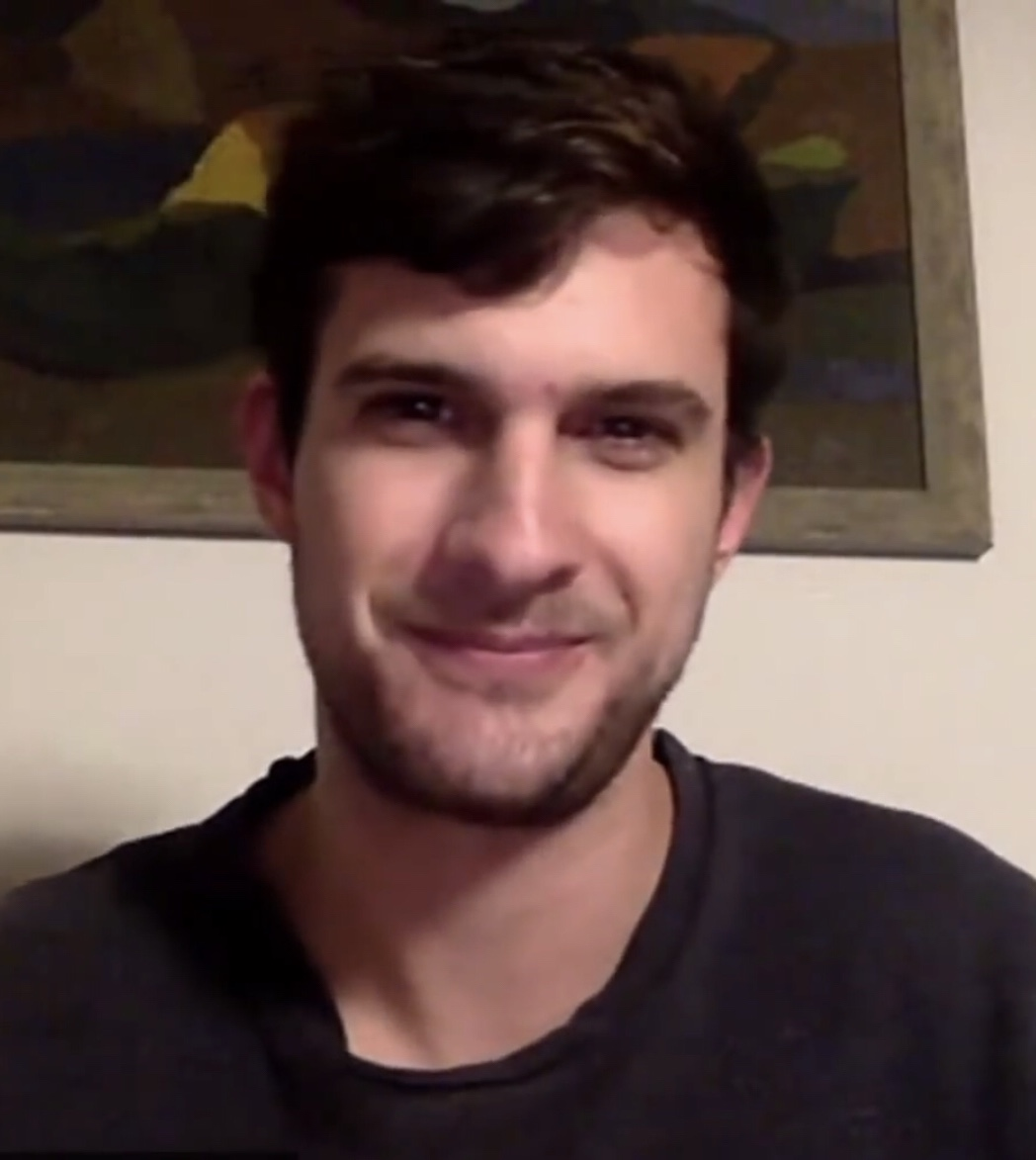
- David in 2020
- Born: David Rashi Kremen Adler; 1993 or 1994 (age 32–33); Encino, California, U.S.
- Citizenship: France, Australia
- Occupations: Economist; activist
- Organizations: Progressive International; Panamerican Congress
- Known for: Left-wing activism
- Relatives: Louise Adler (aunt)
- Website: https://davidrkadler.info/about/

David Rashi Kremen Adler is a French-American left-wing political economist and activist. He serves as co-general coordinator of the Progressive International, an international progressive political network. He is a columnist for The Guardian and Jacobin. He was also a Jewish American participant in the Global Sumud Flotilla and the lead organizer of the Nuestra América Convoy.

== Early life and education ==
David R.K Adler was born in Encino, California to a French Jewish family. His grandfather Jacques Adler was a member of the French resistance against the Nazis. Adler was at Brown University where he majored in Development Studies. He then studied at New College, Oxford, where he was a 2015 recipient of the Rhodes Scholarship. He was also a Fulbright scholar in Mexico City at Colegio de México. In 2026, Adler completed his doctorate degree at Nuffield College, Oxford, with a thesis titled 'Three essays on the new politics of globalization' under Nuffield Fellow Ben Ansell.

== Career ==
Adler has worked as a researcher and policy advisor on foreign policy. In 2020, he became co-general coordinator of Progressive International, an organization launched with the involvement of U.S. Senator Bernie Sanders and Greek economist and politician Yanis Varoufakis. With the organization, he organized the January 2026 conference Nuestra América ("Our America") in Bogota, Colombia to convene a collective response from Latin American political forces following the United States intervention in Venezuela and abduction of Venezuelan president Nicolás Maduro. Adler has coordinated the Panamerican Congress since 2024. He is the co-editor, along with Rosemary Bechler, of the 2020 essay anthology A Vision for Europe 2020.

== Gaza humanitarian aid flotilla ==
In September 2025, Adler participated in the Global Sumud Flotilla, an international, civil society-led maritime initiative launched in mid-2025, which attempted to break the Israeli blockade of the Gaza Strip. During the voyage, Adler described the mission as a non-violent, civilian effort intended to draw international attention to humanitarian conditions in Gaza. In interviews, he characterized the flotilla as a humanitarian and grassroots initiative. He also published an essay from the flotilla on the eve of the Jewish holiday of Yom Kippur, connecting his Jewish heritage to his participation in the project.

A spokesperson for the U.S. State Department said the department viewed the flotilla as a “deliberate and unnecessary provocation” and stated that it “remains focused on realizing President Trump’s plan to end the war, which has been universally welcomed as a historic opportunity for a lasting peace.”

Israeli naval forces intercepted the flotilla before it reached Gaza. Adler and other participants were detained. Following his release, Adler alleged mistreatment and restrictive detention conditions while in Israeli custody. According to him, Israeli politician Itamar Ben-Gvir directly confronted him and other activists at the Port of Ashdod. He was then detained at Ktzi’ot Prison for five days before his deportation to Jordan due to diplomatic pressure from the United States.

The flotilla and subsequent detentions received international media coverage and prompted responses from public officials. This included United States Congressmen Ro Khanna and Jimmy Gomez from Adler's home state of California, who called for clarification regarding the detention of American participants.

== Nuestra América Convoy ==
In 2026, Adler was the organizer of the Nuestra América Convoy, a humanitarian convoy to Cuba, which departed from Mexico on March 20. The convoy delivered critical supplies to the island, approximately 20 tons of food supplies, medical equipment, and solar panels.
