= Ben Ansell =

British academic

Ben Ansell FBA
- Born: 1977 (age 48–49)
- Title: Professor of Comparative Democratic Institutions

Academic background
- Education: University of Manchester; University of California, Berkeley; Harvard University

Academic work
- Discipline: Political science
- Sub-discipline: Democratisation; wealth inequality; comparative political economy
- Institutions: University of Minnesota; Nuffield College, Oxford; Department of Politics and International Relations, University of Oxford

Ben W. Ansell FBA (born 1977) is a British political scientist. He is Professor of Comparative Democratic Institutions at Nuffield College, University of Oxford and, with David Samuels, editor of Comparative Political Studies.

== Education ==
Ansell graduated with a first-class degree in history from the University of Manchester in 1998, followed by an MA in Cultural Studies at the same institution in 1999. He left the UK for the University of California, Berkeley, receiving an MA in political science. He finished his PhD in government at Harvard University in 2006.

== Career ==
Ansell's first academic appointment was as an assistant professor at the University of Minnesota. A year after being promoted to associate professor in 2012, he took up his current position as Professor of Comparative Democratic Institutions at the University of Oxford.

In July 2018 Ansell was elected Fellow of the British Academy (FBA).

His book From the Ballot to the Blackboard: The Redistributive Politics of Education (2010) won the William H. Riker prize for best book in political economy.

He gave the 2023 BBC Reith Lectures, entitled "Our Democratic Future".

== Selected publications ==
- Open Access: Housing and populism, co-authored with David R. K. Adler, Routledge, 2021.
- Brexit and the Politics of Housing in Britain, co-authored with David R. K. Adler, Political Quarterly, 2018.
- From the Ballot to the Blackboard: The Redistributive Politics of Education, Cambridge, Cambridge University Press, 2010.
