= Social Origins of Dictatorship and Democracy =

1966 book by Barrington Moore Jr.

Social Origins of Dictatorship and Democracy: Lord and Peasant in the Making of the Modern World
- Author: Barrington Moore Jr.
- Genre: Non-fiction
- Publication date: 1966

Social Origins of Dictatorship and Democracy: Lord and Peasant in the Making of the Modern World (1966) is a book by Barrington Moore Jr.

The work studied the roots of democratic, fascist and communist regimes in different societies, looking especially at the ways in which industrialization and the pre-existing agrarian regimes interacted to produce those different political outcomes. He drew particular attention to the violence which preceded the development of democratic institutions.

Initially, Moore set out to study a large number of countries, but reduced his number of cases to eight. The book took more than ten years to write.

It is a cornerstone to comparative historical analysis in social science.

== Overall argument ==
Moore's concern was the transformation of pre-industrial agrarian social relations into "modern" ones. He highlighted what he called "three routes to the modern world" - the liberal democratic, the fascist, and the communist - each deriving from the timing of industrialization and the social structure at the time of transition.

== The route to democracy ==
In the simplest sense, Social Origins can be summarized with his famous dictum, "No bourgeois, no democracy".

However, Moore lists five conditions for the development of Western-style democracy (through a "bourgeois revolution"):

1. the "development of a balance to avoid too strong a crown or too independent a landed aristocracy"
2. a shift toward "an appropriate form of commercial agriculture"
3. a "weakening of the landed aristocracy"
4. the "prevention of an aristocratic-bourgeois coalition against the peasants and workers" [which would lead to fascism]
5. a "revolutionary break with the past".
- In England, the effect of the "bourgeois impulse" was to change the attitudes of a portion of the landed elite towards commercial farming, leading to the destruction of the peasantry through the enclosure system and the English Civil War which led to an aristocratic, but moderate democracy.
- In France, the French Revolution did directly include the bourgeoisie, but it was the overwhelming influence of the peasantry that determined "just how far it could go." The peasantry remained thereafter a reservoir of reactionary attitudes.
- In the United States, the industrial north's victory over the Southern planter elite in the Civil War cemented the U.S. path to modernity through liberal democracy, but only after southern planters "acquired a tincture" of urban business - essentially changing their attitudes towards capitalist accumulation. The result, however, was that once this transformation took place, the Northern capitalists ended Reconstruction and allowed the South to implement Jim Crow.

== Routes to dictatorship ==
Moore also directly addressed the Japanese transition to modernity through fascism and the communist path in China, while implicitly remarking on Germany and Russia.

- For Moore, the influence of the bourgeoisie in Japan was significantly more limited than in England, France, and the U.S. Instead of the capitalist accumulation through the "bourgeois impulse" as it did in those three cases, Japan's late transition to industrial modernity was induced through "labor repressive" agriculture — squeezing the peasantry to generate the necessary capital for modernization. This "revolution from above" served to cement a reactionary alliance of a weak bourgeoisie and powerful landowners that culminated in fascism.
- In China, the overwhelming strength of the peasantry vis-a-vis the bourgeoisie and the landed elites resulted in the Chinese Communist Revolution, but they were its first victims. Here, the bourgeoisie allied with the peasants, and created a "revolution from below." Moore criticized attempts by other sociologists to retroactively identify some kind of useful "function" served by the Chinese system of imperial government, and argued that the more likely reason for its prolonged survival was that most people, especially peasants, simply accept their social system "unless and until something happens to threaten and destroy their daily routine."

Moore's theme of the bourgeoisie was that in the states that became democratic, there was a strong bourgeoisie. In Japan and China, the bourgeoisie was weak, and allied with the elites or peasants to create fascism or communism, respectively.

== Reception ==
Theda Skocpol and Margaret Somers described Moore's book as a "work of virtually unparalleled ambition" in terms of substantive scope and complexity of its research design.

Jørgen Møller credits Moore's work for reviving "the classic field of research" of "comparative historical analysis" that Møller traces back "to Tocqueville, Weber, Hintze, Schumpeter, and Bloch."

Many authors have questioned parts of Moore's arguments. Dietrich Rueschemeyer, Evelyne Stephens, and John D. Stephens, in Capitalist Development and Democracy (1992) raise questions about Moore's analysis of the role of the bourgeoisie in democratization.

Samuel Valenzuela argues that, counter to Moore's view, the landed elite supported democratization in Chile.

A comprehensive assessment conducted by James Mahoney concludes that "Moore's specific hypotheses about democracy and authoritarianism receive only limited and highly conditional support."

== Legacy ==
In 2006, Daron Acemoglu and James A. Robinson published a book called Economic Origins of Dictatorship and Democracy, a comparative economic analysis in which the authors expressly acknowledged their "natural intellectual debt to Moore". In 2024, Acemoglu, Robinson, and Simon Johnson won the Nobel Memorial Prize in Economic Sciences for their work.
