= Nuestra América Convoy =

Humanitarian convoy to Cuba

Our America Convoy
- Our America Convoy to Cuba
- Nuestra América Convoy
- The logo of the initiative since February 2026
- Formation: February 2026; 8 months ago
- Region served: Europe, South America and North America
- Organizer: David R. K. Adler
- Website: https://nuestraamericaconvoy.org/
- Formerly called: Nuestra América Flotilla (early February 2026)

The Nuestra América Convoy (English: Our America Convoy) was an international humanitarian movement proposed as a maritime convoy plan to deliver aid to Cuba in response to a severe humanitarian and economic crisis during early 2026. The initiative was initially planned to be a flotilla, before being expanded into a global coordinated mission involving the deliveries of humanitarian supplies by air, land, and sea, and converged in Havana on 21 March 2026. The convoy delivered approximately 20 tons of aid.

== History ==
=== Background ===
==== National context ====
Organizers behind the coalition named the convoy the Nuestra América Convoy (or Our America Convoy), after an essay by the Cuban writer and philosopher José Martí.

Up until 2026 Cuba had received most of its oil imports from the countries of Mexico and Venezuela; however, following the 2026 United States intervention in Venezuela, oil trade with Cuba from Venezuela was forcefully interrupted and other countries who sent oil to Cuba, such as Mexico, were threatened with tariffs. Specifically, the United States has begun blocking oil tankers heading to Cuba, targeting companies such as the Mexican state-owned Pemex. This effort seems to have been tied to ambitions of the Second Trump Administration to bring about a regime change in Cuba by the end of 2026.

The impacts of the policy include blackouts, lack of fuel for aircraft and collection trucks, cancellation of national festivities due to worsening economic conditions, and food as well as humanitarian aid shortages reported by the United Nations Human Rights Office, which stated the current situation created obstacles to its UN World Food Programme relief efforts initiated following Hurricane Melissa and also local food sovereignty.

==== Formation of the initiative ====
Before the official creation of the initiative, a convention by the same name as the initiative was held in Bogotá, when delegations from twenty countries agreed to participate in the future initiative, if created.

A coalition of progressive organizations, such as Progressive International and CodePink, founded the initiative in February 2026 after being directly inspired by the Global Sumud Flotilla. The initiative's organizer is David R. K. Adler, an activist who previously participated in the Global Sumud Flotilla. The initiative was pushed into creation by the policies of the Second Trump Administration, according to its creators.

==== Changes in plans in favor of a convoy ====
Initially, the convoy was only supposed to be a flotilla, thus being a solely maritime effort; however, following self reported "overwhelming global solidarity with Cuba" the flotilla officially transformed into a convoy.

=== Convoy ===
On 20 March 2026 the flotilla had already left for Cuba from Mexico, boarding with "hundred solar panels, essential for homes and schools, as well as about 50 tonnes of goods including rice, oats, beans and medicines already stowed", vowing to pass through Mexican and Cuban national waters and to avoid US owned ones. The crew upon departure from Mexico was mostly composed of North and Southern American as well as Europeans, most notably Italians tied to various pro-Cuban organizations (Such as "Agenzia Interscambio Culturale ed Economico con Cuba" and "Camalli").

The convoy's flagship vessel, a tuna and shrimp fishing boat named Maguro, was symbolically renamed "Granma 2.0" by its crew of 32 activists from countries including Australia, Brazil, Ecuador, Italy, Mexico and the United States, in tribute to the Granma, the yacht that carried Fidel Castro, Che Guevara, and other revolutionaries from Mexico to Cuba in 1956. Departing from Progreso, Yucatán, on 20 March, the vessel reached Havana on 24 March, three days later than planned after battling strong winds, currents, and mechanical problems. Cuban President Miguel Díaz-Canel, who had met with convoy members earlier, said on social media that the country welcomed the "Granma 2.0" "with profound gratitude."

==== Missing sailboats incident ====
On 26 March 2026, the Mexican Navy announced a search and rescue operation for two sailboats, the Tiger Moth and Friend Ship, carrying nine people as part of the convoy, after losing radio contact with them following their departure from Isla Mujeres, Mexico. The United States Coast Guard had reportedly located the vessels before the Mexican Navy's own aircraft spotted them approximately 80 nautical miles northwest of Havana. On 28 March, Mexican authorities and convoy organizers confirmed both crews were safe.

=== Participants ===
Participants on the convoy consist of 650 delegates from 33 countries and 120 organizations. Participants who traveled on the convoy include Jeremy Corbyn, Clara López, Pablo Iglesias, Chris Smalls, Thiago Ávila, Hasan Piker, Medea Benjamin, Aleksa Vulović, and Kneecap.

== Goals ==
=== Planned schedule ===
A plane with the capacity to guest 200 participants is scheduled to depart towards Havana from Rome with a stop in Milan on 17 March 2026 and it was planned to return on 26 March 2026. As of late February 2026 planes from Germany and Spain were also mentioned, although without a formal confirmation. Il Fatto Quotidiano stated that aid would also depart from Argentina, Mexico and the United States of America, as well as other, unspecified, countries.

The plan includes the converging of all the convoys in the Malecón esplanade where the humanitarian aid and supplies brought by the flotilla would then remain stored and later distributed around the island.

== Impact ==
The convoy delivered approximately 20 tons of aid to Cuba, including food, baby formula, bicycles, and solar panels.

== Aftermath ==
20 United States citizens who took part in the convoy as part of the Code Pink delegation were detained and interrogated by Customs and Border Protection after returning to the United States. 18 of the people had electronic devices seized.

== Reactions ==
=== Before departure ===
==== By national movements and associations ====
The National Movement of Solidarity with Cuba in Spain (formed by 65 associations and groups) showed support for the initiative and, as part of their campaign under the slogan of "Against the US Blockade, Energy for Cuba", they vowed to support the convoy upon arrival by protesting outside US embassies and consulates on 21 March 2026.

One of the convoy's local partners for aid distribution is the nonprofit, the Cuban Institute of Friendship with the Peoples. And while organizers of the convoy have described the organization as an "independent nonprofit," declassified documents from the CIA allege that the organization may be a front for Cuban intelligence services.

In Italy, the Alternative Student Opposition, the Network of Communists and Cambiare Rotta stated they would openly support the convoy, and were later joined by the political party Power to the People and by the labour union Unione Sindacale di Base.

==== By notable individuals ====
Ada Colau, Greta Thunberg, and Rashida Tlaib have endorsed the initiative.

=== After departure ===
Journalist Yoani Sánchez argued that the convoy's engagement with Cuban authorities undermined its stated solidarity, given the government's record of repression, including the detention of political prisoners after the 2021 protests.

María Elvira Salazar publicly criticised the convoy, portraying it as insensitive and characterising elements of the trip as resembling tourism rather than a serious humanitarian effort.

The New Humanitarian reported that convoy participants stayed in five-star Havana hotels that retained electricity during blackouts affecting the rest of the city, and travelled around the capital in electric buses while public transportation elsewhere in the country remained paralysed by the fuel shortage, prompting criticism from some Cubans. Some American conservative commentators similarly characterised the convoy as a largely symbolic gesture, and noted that several of its "strategic partner" organizations, including the U.S. Peace Council, the International Association of Democratic Lawyers, and the National Lawyers Guild, had long-standing ties to Cuban and Soviet-aligned solidarity movements.
