= Comparative Political Studies =

Academic journal

- Discipline: Political science
- Language: English
- Edited by: David J. Samuels, Benjamin W. Ansell, Dawn Teele

Publication details
- History: 1968-present
- Publisher: SAGE Publications
- Frequency: Monthly
- Impact factor: 4.2 (2023)

Standard abbreviations
- ISO 4: Comp. Political Stud.

Indexing
- ISSN: 0010-4140 (print); 1552-3829 (web)
- LCCN: 68007517
- OCLC no.: 1564560

Links
- Journal homepage; Online access; Online archive

Comparative Political Studies is a peer-reviewed academic journal. It was established in 1968 by SAGE Publications, who continue to publish it today. The editors are David J. Samuels, University of Minnesota, Benjamin W. Ansell, University of Oxford, and Dawn Teele, Johns Hopkins University. The journal publishes methodological, theoretical, and research articles in the field of comparative politics at both the cross-national and intra-national levels.

== Abstracting and indexing ==
Comparative Political Studies is abstracted and indexed in Scopus and the Social Sciences Citation Index. According to the Journal Citation Reports, the journal has a 2023 impact factor of 4.2.

== See also ==
- List of political science journals
