= Evelyne Huber =

American political scientist

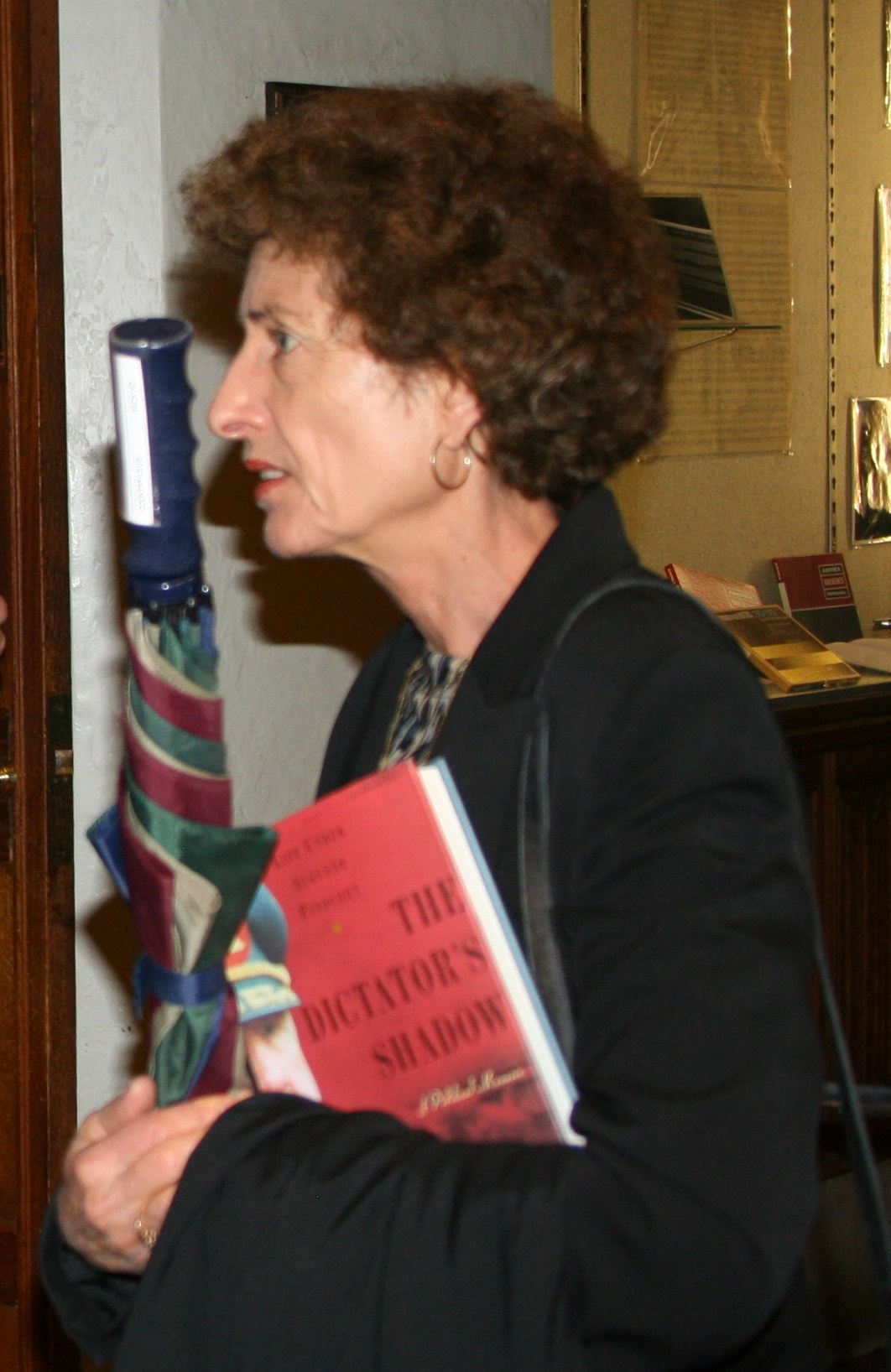
- Education: University of Zürich; Yale University
- Awards: Guggenheim Fellowship; Honorary doctorate, University of Bern; Guillermo O'Donnell Award, LASA
- Scientific career
- Fields: Political science; Latin American studies
- Workplaces: University of North Carolina, Chapel Hill; Northwestern University; University of California, Irvine; College of the Holy Cross; University of Wisconsin-Milwaukee; University of Rhode Island

Evelyne Huber (formerly Evelyne Huber Stephens) is an American and Swiss political scientist specializing in comparative politics and a scholar of Latin America, currently the Morehead Alumni Professor of Political Science at the University of North Carolina, Chapel Hill, where she was the department chair for more than a decade. Her work has focused on democracy and redistribution, particularly in Latin America.

== Education and early career ==
Huber studied Social Psychology, Sociology, and Political Science at the University of Zürich, graduating in 1972. She obtained an MA in political science from Yale University in 1973, followed by a PhD in political science from Yale University in 1977.

From 1977 until 1978, Huber was a visiting professor of political science at the University of Rhode Island. She spent the following year lecturing at the University of Wisconsin-Milwaukee, followed by 6 years at the College of the Holy Cross. From 1985 to 1987 she was a professor at the University of California, Irvine, and then at Northwestern University from 1985 until 1992, when she moved to UNC-Chapel Hill.

== Career ==
In addition to publishing articles in journals like The American Journal of Sociology, the Latin American Research Review, and Comparative Political Studies, Huber has edited, written, or co-written 9 books, one of which was solo-authored. That book, called The Politics of Workers' Participation: The Peruvian Approach in Comparative Perspective, was published in 1980. The book studies the role of workers' participation in political conflict. Huber considers workers' participation schemes in three types of political-economic systems: a "liberal-pluralist" type represented by the cases of France, West Germany, Sweden, and Chile, a "bureaucratic-centralist" type represented by Yugoslavia, and an "authoritarian-corporatist" type represented by Peru. Linda Fuller, reviewing the work in the American Journal of Sociology, writes that one interesting finding that emerges from the book is that worker's participation schemes that aim to increase identification with the workplace and the social system can ironically mobilize workers to make demands of the system, and also that "if there is no strong and unified working-class political organization at the national level, they are extremely vulnerable", which itself may not even be sufficient.

Huber's subsequent work has also largely focused on the relationship between economic structure and democratic movements in Latin America, the influence of workers on policy, and the politics of welfare and income inequality. Several of these works, including her 1992 book Capitalist Development and Democracy, have won multiple prizes and continue to be heavily cited. Three of Huber's books have won the Outstanding Book Award from the Political Sociology section of the American Sociological Association, and she has won a number of other awards from the American Sociological Association and the American Political Science Association.

Huber has also served in several notable service positions in political science and Latin American Studies. In 2006, Huber became the chair of the Department of Political Science at UNC-Chapel Hill, a position she held until 2017. From 2012 to 2013, she was the president of the Latin American Studies Association, having previously been its vice president for 2 years. She also for several years ran the Comparative Politics section of the American Political Science Association.

Huber has had one of the largest impacts of any active political scientist, as measured by citations. In a 2019 citation analysis by the political scientists Hannah June Kim and Bernard Grofman, Huber was listed as the 16th most cited woman in political science at an American university, and one of the 25 most cited political scientists who obtained their PhD between 1975 and 1979. In the Spring of 1995, she was a Fellow at the Swedish Collegium for Advanced Study in Uppsala, Sweden. Huber's significant impact has been recognized with a number of notable awards. In 2009, she received the Guggenheim Fellowship, which is given to people "who have demonstrated exceptional capacity for productive scholarship or exceptional creative ability in the arts". In 2010, Huber received an honorary doctorate from the University of Bern. She was also a co-recipient of the 2019 Guillermo O'Donnell Democracy Award from the Latin American Studies Association, which recognizes "outstanding scholarship in the field of democracy studies".

Huber has written pieces in the news media for outlets like Foreign Affairs, and has been interviewed by or cited in works like Jacobin, The Economist, and Think Progress.

== Selected works ==
- The Politics of Workers' Participation: The Peruvian Approach in Comparative Perspective (1980)
- Capitalist Development and Democracy, with Dietrich Rueschemeyer and John D. Stephens (1992)
- Development and crisis of the welfare state: Parties and policies in global markets, with John D Stephens (2010)

== Selected awards ==
- Guggenheim Fellow (2009)
- Honorary doctorate, University of Bern (2010)
- Guillermo O'Donnell Democracy Award, Latin American Studies Association (2019)
