= Sylvia Maxfield =

American academic in finance

- Education: Cornell University, Harvard University
- Occupations: Academic, higher education leader

Sylvia Maxfield is an American business and higher education leader, currently serving as interim provost and senior vice president for academic affairs at Providence College in Providence, Rhode Island. She earned a Bachelor of Arts degree in economics and government from Cornell University in 1980 and later attained a Ph.D. in political economy from Harvard University in 1988. Born in NYC, her early education was at the Downtown Community School.

== Professional career ==
From 1988 to 1997, she served as an assistant and associate professor in Yale University's Department of Political Science and School of Management, as well as director of Yale's master's program in international relations. Maxfield worked as an international fixed-income strategist for Lehman Brothers prior to transitioning to Simmons University in 2002, where she led the MBA program and served as professor and director of the Principled Leadership Program.

Maxfield joined the Providence College School of Business in 2012. Throughout her tenure, she oversaw the building of the Ryan Center for Business Studies.

Under Maxfield's leadership, the Providence College School of Business has sustained the AACSB accreditation and grown the enrollment of undergraduate and graduate business students.

Her research and experience focuses on the dynamics that govern how financial markets and institutions can best serve the public interest. She has authored and edited several books. In addition, she serves as a board member for the State Investment Commission of Rhode Island and for Berkshire Bank, where she chairs the Audit Committee.

== Selected works ==
- Maxfield, Sylvia (1990). Governing capital: international finance and Mexican politics. Ithaca: Cornell University Press. ISBN 9780801424588.
- Maxfield, Sylvia (1997). Gatekeepers of growth: the international political economy of central banking in developing countries. Princeton, NJ: Princeton University Press. ISBN 0691026874.
