= David Samuels (political scientist) =

David Julian Samuels is an American political scientist who is the Distinguished McKnight University Professor of Political Science at the University of Minnesota.

Samuels earned his BA from Swarthmore College in 1989 and his Ph.D. from the University of California, San Diego in 1998. He joined the faculty of the University of Minnesota in 1998, and was named full professor in 2010. He was awarded a Distinguished McKnight University Professorship in 2012.

Samuels specializes in comparative politics and Brazilian politics. He is the author of Ambition, Federalism, and Legislative Politics in Brazil (Cambridge University Press, 2003) and "Separation of Powers" in the Oxford Handbook of Comparative Politics. He has published articles in many of the field's top academic journals, and his work has been cited over 2,600 times. Samuels is co-editor with Ben Ansell and Dawn Teele of Comparative Political Studies.
