= Morlino =

Morlino is an Italian surname. Notable people with the surname include:

- Leonardo Morlino (1947–2025), Italian political scientist
- Robert C. Morlino (1946–2018), American Roman Catholic bishop
- Tommaso Morlino (1925–1983), Italian politician
