= Giovanni Sartori =

Italian academic and political scientist (1924–2017)

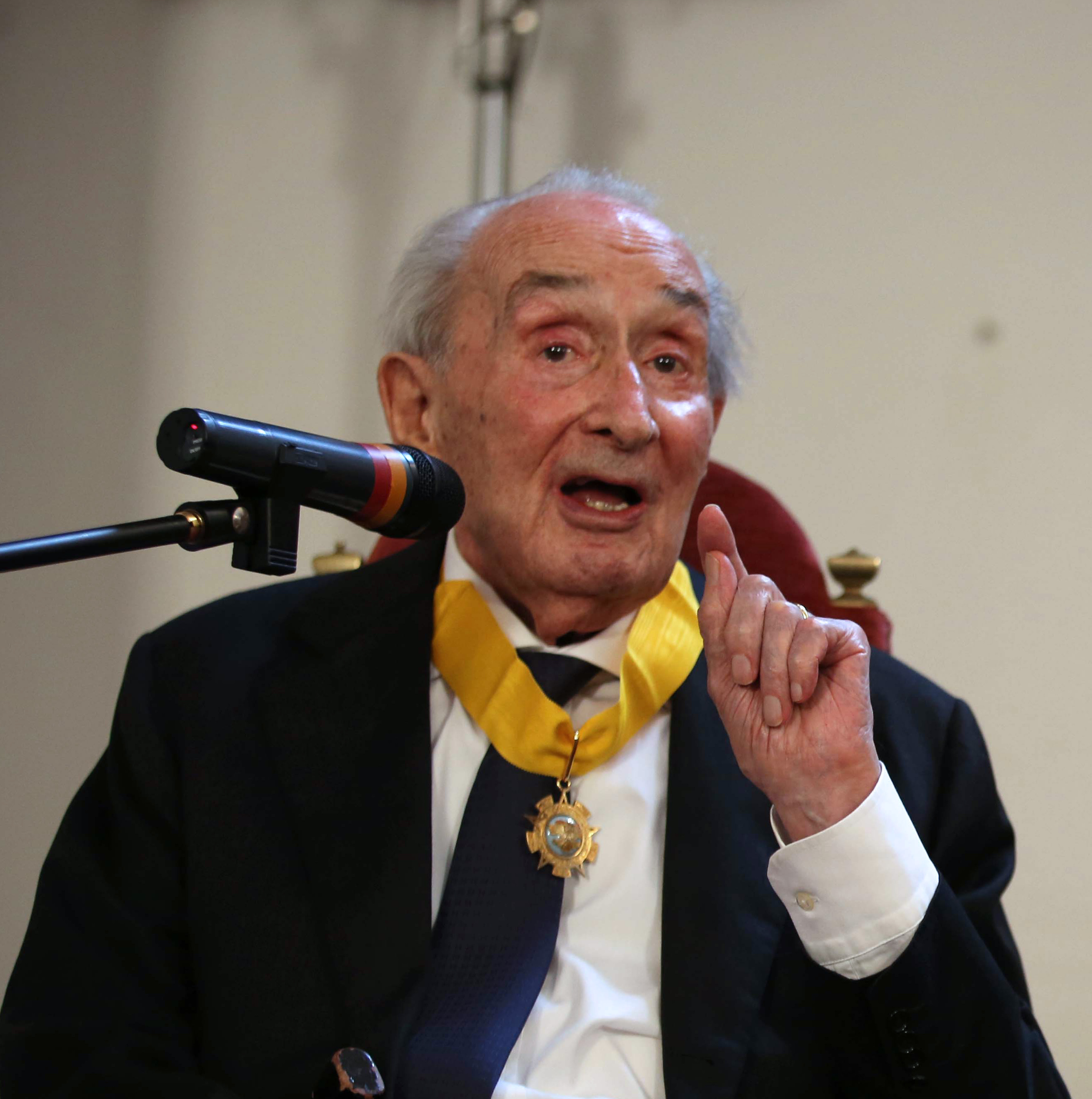
- Born: 13 May 1924; Florence, Italy
- Died: 4 April 2017 (aged 92); Rome, Italy
- Citizenship: Italian
- Education: University of Florence
- Occupations: Professor, political scientist
- Awards: Princess of Asturias Awards for Social Sciences (2005)
- Scientific career
- Fields: Comparative politics
- Workplaces: Stanford University, Columbia University
- Doctoral students: Gianfranco Pasquino

Giovanni Sartori (Italian: [dʒoˈvanni sarˈtoːri]; 13 May 1924 – 4 April 2017) was an Italian political scientist who specialized in the study of democracy, political parties, and comparative politics. He held faculty positions at University of Florence, European University Institute, Stanford University and Columbia University.

== Early life ==
Sartori was born in Florence in 1924. He graduated in Political and Social Sciences at the University of Florence in 1946.

== Academic career ==
Sartori stayed on at the University of Florence, teaching History of Modern Philosophy and Doctrine of the State starting in 1946. He became a lecturer in Modern Philosophy (1950–1956) and in Political Science (1956–1963), and subsequently professor of Sociology (1963–66). Sartori became full professor of Political Science and taught at Florence University from 1966 to 1976.

During this time, Sartori founded the first modern Political Science academic post in Italy, and was Dean of the newly formed University of Florence's Department of Political Science. He also taught at the European University Institute (1974–1976) and then became professor of Political Science at Stanford University (1976–79). Finally, Sartori served as Albert Schweitzer Professor in the Humanities at Columbia University from 1979 to 1994 and was appointed professor emeritus.

Sartori was president of the Committee for Conceptual and Terminological Analysis (COCTA) of IPSA, the International Sociological Association (ISA), and the International Social Science Council (ISSC) from 1970 to 1979. He was founder and editor of the Rivista Italiana di Scienza Politica (Italian Political Science Review) from 1971 to 2003. Sartori was also a regular contributor, as an op-ed writer, of the leading Italian newspaper Corriere della Sera. He died at the age of 92 in Rome from throat cancer on 4 April 2017.

=== On concepts ===
Sartori was deeply interested in the formation, analysis, and use of political concepts. He observed that political science, for better or worse, lacked the coordination in terminology that he presumed to exist in the physical and biological sciences. He encouraged a more "intentional" use of concepts, with the objective of furthering a shared understanding of ideas. In 1970, he and others established the first permanent research committee of the newly created International Political Science Association (IPSA). The committee, Research Committee on Concepts and Methods (RC 01), was intended to ameliorate the "Tower of Babel (Note: It is a hint to the Tower of Babel allegory.) problem" in political science, and is still active.

Sartori's 1970 article "Concept Misformation in Comparative Politics" published in The American Political Science Review is prominent in the field, leading Gary Goertz to write, "There are few articles in political science that deserve the predicate 'classic,' but Sartori's ... merits the label." In his article, Sartori presented the notion of a Ladder of abstraction, which captured how any concept can shift from abstract to concrete by adding properties to it and vice versa. Sartori used the ladder to explore the problem of abstract concepts traveling between fields of information and might be stretched beyond meaning. Sartori's notions of "conceptual traveling" (the application of a concept from one case to a new case) and "conceptual stretching" (the mismatch that happens when a concept does not fit a new case) is influential in social science methodology. Conceptual stretching is frequently used as a criticism of studies that employ large-N quantitative analysis.

=== On parties and party systems ===
Sartori's Parties and Party Systems: A Framework for Analysis (1976) provides a comprehensive and authoritative approach to the classification of party systems. It is seen as having "outstanding, lasting significance to the field" on study on political parties.

=== Pluralism, multiculturalism and foreigners ===
Sartori, in his 2000 work Pluralismo, multiculturalismo e estranei: saggio sulla società multietnica, which has not been translated in English yet, remained reluctant to accept the possibility of authentic "integration" of different cultures. According to his position he distinguishes "pluralism" which in his view means shared civic values and reciprocal integration from "multiculturalism" which is regarded as a cause of social fragmentation that undermines common principles of coexistence.

In this sense, he sustained that integration requires a social recognition of core civic principles, such as the separation of religion from political authority and the protection of universal individual rights. Following that hypothesis, for instance, Sartori suggested that certain forms of political islam suppose a challenge as far as its integration into western democracies is concerned, considering that islamic world view doesn´t accept separation of Church and State. Alongside, Quranic law doesn´t recognize universal and inviolable individual rights.

== Honors and awards ==
Sartori received multiple honors and awards throughout his career.

- 1971, President of the Italian Republic’s Gold Medal for Cultural and Educational Merits.
- 1975, Fellow of American Academy of Arts and Sciences
- 1998, Outstanding Book Award of the American Political Science Association (APSA) for Parties and Party Systems: A Framework for Analysis (1976).
- 1999, Commander of the Order of the Southern Cross, Brazil.
- 2005, Princess of Asturias Awards for Social Sciences
- 2005, Lifetime Achievement Award, European Consortium for Political Research (ECPR).
- 2006, Lifetime Achievement Award, Qualitative Method Section of APSA, for Exceptional Contributions to Social Science Methodology.
- 2006, Life Achievement Award, American Political Science Association.
- 2007, The Mattei Dogan Foundation Prize in European Political Sociology, ECPR, University of Essex, England, Pisa.
- 2009, Karl Deutsch Award of the International Political Science Association (IPSA), which honours a prominent scholar engaged in the cross-disciplinary research.
- 2013, Premio Isaiah Berlin.
- 2014, Grand Cross of the Order of Bernardo O'Higgins, Chile

In 2015, Sartoti received a Mexican venera of the Order of the Aztec Eagle from president Enrique Peña Nieto. He also received doctor Honoris Causa from the University of Genoa, 1992; Georgetown University, Washington D.C.,1994; University of Guadalajara, 1997; University of Buenos Aires, 1998; Complutense University of Madrid, 2001; University of Bucharest, 2001; University of Athens. Since 2004, the American Political Science Association (APSA) Organized Section for Qualitative and Multi-Method Research gives the Giovanni Sartori Book Award annually to "honors Giovanni Sartori's work on qualitative methods and concept formation, and especially his contribution to helping scholars think about problems of context as they refine concepts and apply them to new spatial and temporal settings."

== Selected publications ==
- Sartori, Giovanni. 1957. Democrazia e Definizioni. Bologna: Il Mulino.
- Sartori, Giovanni (1962). Democratic Theory: Based on the Author's Translation of "Democrazia e definizioni", 2nd edition, Il Mulino, Bologna, 1958. Detroit: Wayne University Press – via Internet Archive.
- Sartori, Giovanni. 1966. "European Political Parties: The Case of Polarized Pluralism," pp. 137– 176, in J. LaPalombara and M. Weiner (eds.), Political Parties and Political Development. Princeton, N.J., Princeton University Press.
- Sartori, Giovanni. 1969. "From the Sociology of Politics to Political Sociology," pp. 65–100, in S.M. Lipset (ed.), Politics and the Social Sciences. New York, Oxford University Press.
- Sartori, Giovanni. 1970. "Concept Misformation in Comparative Politics." The American Political Science Review 64 (4): 1033–1053.
- Sartori, Giovanni, Fred W. Riggs, and Henry Teune. 1975. Tower of Babel: On the Definition and Analysis of Concepts in the Social Sciences. Pittsburgh: International Studies Association.
- Sartori, Giovanni. 1976. Parties and Party Systems: A Framework for Analysis. New York: Cambridge University Press.
- Sartori, Giovanni (ed.). 1984. Social Science Concepts: A Systematic Analysis. London, Sage.
- Sartori, Giovanni. 1984. "Guidelines for Concept Analysis," pp. 15–85, in Giovanni Sartori (ed.), Social Science Concepts: A Systematic Analysis. London, Sage.
- Sartori, Giovanni. 1987. The Theory of Democracy Revisited, vol. 1, The Contemporary Debate; vol. 2, The Classical Issues. Chatham, N.J: Chatham House.
- Sartori, Giovanni. 1991. "Comparing and Miscomparing." Journal of Theoretical Politics (3)3: 243–257.
- Sartori, Giovanni. 1994. Comparative Constitutional Engineering. New York: New York University Press.
- Sartori, Giovanni. 1994. "Neither Presidentialism nor Parliamentarism," pp. 106–118, in J.J. Linz e A. Valenzuela (eds.), The Failure of Presidential Democracy. Baltimore: Johns Hopkins University Press.
- Sartori, Giovanni. 1997. Homo Videns: televisione e post-pensiero. Rome-Bari: Laterza.
- Sartori, Giovanni. 2000. Pluralismo, multiculturalismo e estranei: saggio sulla società multietnica. Milan: Rizzoli.
- Sartori, Giovanni. 2004. Mala tempora. Rome-Bari: Laterza.
- Sartori, Giovanni. 2006. Mala costituzione e altri malanni. Rome-Bari: Laterza.
- Sartori, Giovanni. 2009. Concepts and Method in Social Science. The Tradition of Giovanni Sartori. Edited by David Collier and John Gerring, New York and London: Routledge.

== Resources on Sartori and his research ==
- Collier David, and John Gerring. 2009. "Giovanni Sartori & His Legacy," in David Collier and John Gerring (eds.), Giovanni Sartori, Concepts and Method in Social Science. The Tradition of Giovanni Sartori. New York and London: Routledge.
- Cotta, Maurizio. 2017. "Sartori: a towering figure of international political science, the founder of contemporary Italian political science and a mordant political polemicist." European Political Science 16(3): 430–435.
- Kubát, Michal, and Martin Mejstřík. (eds.). 2019. Giovanni Sartori. Challenging Political Science. Rowman & Littlefield Publishers.
- Pasquino, Gianfranco (ed.). 2005. La Scienza Politica di Giovanni Sartori. Bologna: Il Mulino. The chapters of this book are celebration notes by Italian scholars (Domenico Fisichella, Angelo Panebianco) that have had some kind of collaboration with Sartori.
- Pasquino, Gianfranco. 2005. "The Political Science of Giovanni Sartori." European Political Science 4(1): 33–41.
- Pasquino, Gianfranco. 2020. Bobbio y Sartori. Comprender y cambiar la política. Buenos Aires: Eudeba.
- Rubí Calderón, José Ramón López (ed.). 2009. Para Leer a Sartori. Mexico,. This book is in Spanish, featuring articles by Gianfranco Pasquino and Dieter Nohlen, and is wide in scope. Besides, it seems, is more critical and more student-oriented. It covers the very Political Science part of Sartori's bulk of work, as well as the books that he has published dealing with such themes as multiculturalism, "videopolitics" and the environment.
- Sartori, Giovanni. 1999. "Chance, Luck and Stubbornness," pp. 93–100, in Hans Daalder (ed.), Comparative European Politics. The Story of a Profession. New York: Casell/Pinter.
- Sartori, Giovanni. 2018. "Note biografiche e bibliografia".

== See also ==
- Polarized pluralism
- Qualitative research
- Robert A. Dahl
- Maurice Duverger
