= International Political Science Abstracts =

- Discipline: Political science
- Language: English
- Edited by: Paul J Godt, Serge Hurtig

Publication details
- History: 1951–present
- Publisher: SAGE Publications on behalf of the International Political Science Association
- Frequency: Bimonthly

Standard abbreviations
- ISO 4: Int. Political Sci. Abstr.

Indexing
- ISSN: 0020-8345 (print); 1751-9292 (web)
- LCCN: 54003623
- OCLC no.: 535290693

Links
- Journal homepage; Online access; Online archive

International Political Science Abstracts/Documentation Politique Internationale (IPSA) is a bimonthly peer-reviewed academic journal that covers political science. The editors-in-chief are Paul J. Godt (American University of Paris) and Serge Hutig (Fondation Nationale des Sciences Politiques). The journal was established in 1951 and is published by SAGE Publications on behalf of the International Political Science Association (IPSA).

== Abstracting and indexing ==
The journal is abstracted and indexed in:

- Academic Search
- International Bibliography of Periodical Literature in the Humanities and Social Sciences
- International Bibliography of the Social Sciences
- Scopus
- Sociological Abstracts
- Worldwide Political Science Abstracts
