= James K. Pollock =

James Kerr Pollock (May 25, 1898 – October 4, 1968) was an American political scientist.

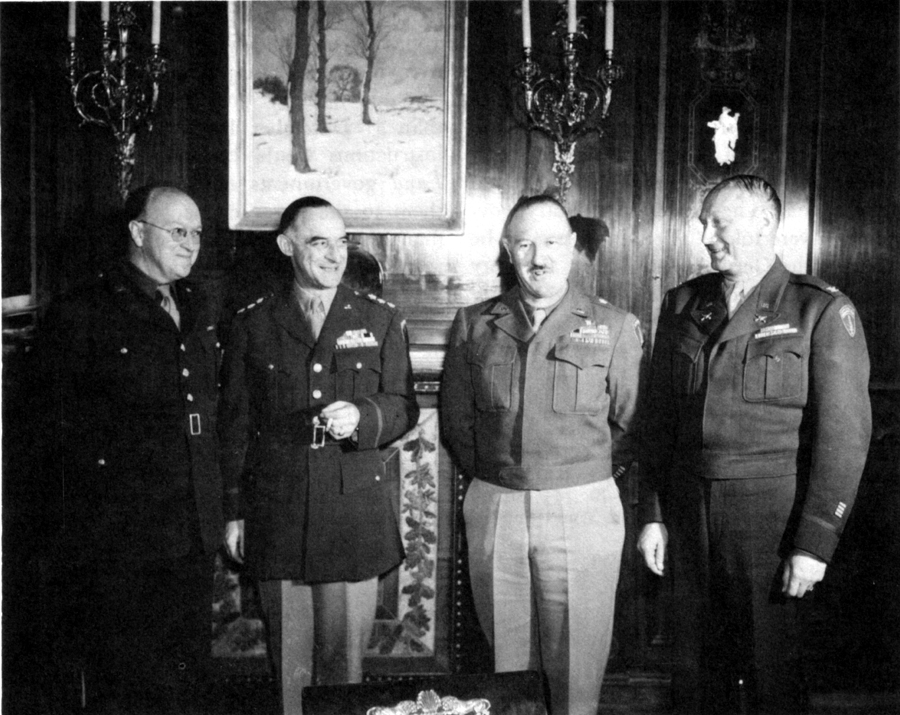
Pollock (left) with Clay, Muller, and Newman, 1945

He was born on May 25, 1898, in New Castle, Pennsylvania and attended the University of Michigan, where he earned his bachelor's and master's degrees, from 1916 to 1921. Between 1921 and 1925, Pollock completed a doctorate at Harvard University. Concurrently, Pollock taught at Geneva College and at Ohio State University. He began teaching at Michigan in 1925 as a lecturer, and was named full professor in 1934. Pollock was chair of the department of political science between 1947 and 1961, and held the Murfin professorship from 1948 to retirement in 1968.

Pollock was appointed the first director of the Michigan Civil Service Study Commission in 1935. From 1947 to 1949, he was a member of the Hoover Commission. He served as president of the American Political Science Association from 1949 to 1950, and led the International Political Science Association from 1955 to 1958. He specialized in the politics of Germany, and served as an adviser to the United States federal government during and after World War II.

For his public service, United States President Harry S. Truman awarded Pollock the Medal for Merit in 1946. The German government bestowed upon Pollock the Grand Cross Order of Merit in 1956, followed by the Knight Commander's Cross three years later.

Pollock died on October 4, 1968, months after retirement from the University of Michigan.
