= Karl Deutsch =

Czech political scientist

Karl Wolfgang Deutsch (21 July 1912 – 1 November 1992) was a Czech social and political scientist. He was a professor at MIT, Yale University and Harvard University, as well as Director of WZB Berlin Social Science Center.

Deutsch studied war and peace, nationalism, co-operation, and communication, as well as pioneered quantitative methods and formal systems analysis and model-thinking into the field of political and social sciences, contributing to the development of sociological liberalism school in international relations.

== Early life ==
Born into a German-speaking Czech-Jewish family in Prague on 21 July 1912 when the Kingdom of Bohemia was part of the Austro-Hungarian Empire, Deutsch became a citizen of Czechoslovakia after World War I. His mother Maria was a Social Democrat, and one of the first women to be elected to the Czechoslovak parliament in 1920. His father Martin Moritz Deutsch owned an optical shop on Prague's Wenceslas Square and was also active in the Czechoslovak Social Democratic Worker's Party. His uncle Julius Deutsch was an important political leader in the Social Democratic Party of Austria.

== Education ==
Karl studied law at the German University of Prague, where he graduated in 1934. He discontinued further studies as his overt anti-Nazi stance caused opposition by pro-Nazi students. Karl married his wife Ruth Slonitz in 1936, and after spending two years in England returned to Prague where due to his former anti-Nazi activities, he could not return to the German University. He instead joined its Czech counterpart, the Charles University, where he obtained a law degree in international and canon law and a PhD in Political Sciences in 1938.

== Emigration and career ==
In 1938 following the Munich Agreement allowing German troops to enter the Sudetenland, he and his wife did not return from a trip to the United States. In 1939 Deutsch obtained a scholarship to carry out advanced studies at Harvard University where he received a second PhD in political science in 1951. His dissertation, Nationalism and Social Communication, was awarded Harvard’s Sumner Prize in 1951.

During World War II he worked for the Office of Strategic Services and participated in the San Francisco conference that resulted in the creation of the United Nations in 1945. Deutsch taught at several universities; first at MIT from 1943 to 1956 (he became a professor of history and political science at MIT in 1952); then at Yale University (initially as a visiting professor in 1957 before becoming a permanent professor in 1958) until 1967; and again at Harvard until 1982. He became a professor at Harvard in 1967, becoming Stanfield Professor of International Peace at Harvard in 1971, a position he held until his death. At Yale University, Deutsch developed the Yale Political Data Program, which collected quantitative indicators for theory testing. Among his advisees at Harvard were Mahmood Mamdani.

Deutsch worked extensively on cybernetics, on the application of simulation and system dynamics models to the study of social, political, and economic problems, known as wicked problems. He built upon earlier efforts at world modeling such as those advanced and advocated by authors of the Club of Rome such as Limits to Growth by Donella Meadows, et al. (1972). He worked with an interdisciplinary team to build new concepts such as security community to the literature. Deutch also "theorized that communication and the exchange of people and goods has a positive effect on international cooperation."

He held several other prestigious positions; he was a member of the board of World Society Foundation in Zürich, Switzerland from 1984 onwards. He was also elected President of the American Political Science Association in 1969, of the International Political Science Association in 1976, and of the Society for General Systems Research in 1983. From 1977 to 1987, he was Director of the Social Science Research Center Berlin (Wissenschaftszentrum Berlin für Sozialforschung, WZB) in Berlin.

In his 1963 book The Nerves of Government, Deutsch proposed the concept of information elites: groups controlling the means of mass communication and thereby exercising significant political power. He argued that modern political systems function as communication networks where decision-making and social control depend on the flow and management of information. In his formulation, information elites act as gatekeepers who influence political outcomes by shaping which messages are transmitted and enforced. Deutsch’s cybernetic model emphasizes the role of communication channels in promoting or restricting the autonomy and responsiveness of political communities, highlighting the centrality of information control in governance.

== Personal life ==
He died in Cambridge, Massachusetts, on 1 November 1992. He has two daughters and three grandchildren.

== Selected publications ==
- Nationalism and Social Communication ISBN 978-0-262-04002-0, 1953, 1966 — from a dissertation at Harvard, published by MIT Press.
- Deutsch, Karl Wolfgang; Burrell, Sidney A.; Kann, Robert A.; Lee, Maurice Jr.; Lichterman, Martin; Lindgren, Raymond E.; Loewenheim, Francis L.; Van Wagenen, Richard W. (1957). Political community and the North Atlantic area: International organization in the light of historical experience. Princeton, New Jersey: Princeton University Press. doi:10.1515/9781400878512. hdl:2027/dul1.ark:/13960/t5kb2bm1b. LCCN 57005461. OCLC 1110299314. Project MUSE book 42923.
- The Nerves of Government: Models of Political Communication and Control (1966), ISBN 978-0-02-907280-6
- Arms control and the Atlantic alliance: Europe faces coming policy decisions. New York: John Wiley & Sons. 1967. ISBN 978-0-471-21140-2. OCLC 505872.
- Nationalism and its Alternatives (1969), ISBN 978-0-394-43763-7
- Problems of World Modeling: Political and Social Implications (1977), Published by HarperCollins Publishers. ISBN 978-0-88410-656-2
- The Analysis of International Relations (1978), by Prentice-Hall, ISBN 978-0-13-033225-7
- Tides Among Nations (1979), ISBN 978-0-02-907300-1
- Politics and Government (1980), published by Houghton-Mifflin, ISBN 978-0-395-17840-9
- Comparative Government: Politics of Industrialized and Developing Nations (1981), Published by Houghton Mifflin. ISBN 978-0-395-29759-9
- Voyage of the Mind, 1930–1980 an autobiographical sketch.
- “Karl W. Deutsch: Pioneer in the Theory of International Relations” - With a Preface by Charles Lewis Taylor and Bruce M. Russett | Charles Lewis Taylor | Springerhttps://www.springer.com/gp/book/9783319029092

== See also ==
- Transactionalism
- Karl Deutsch Award by International Political Science Association
- Karl Deutsch Award by International Studies Association
