= Maria Deutsch =

Czechoslovak politician (1882–1969)

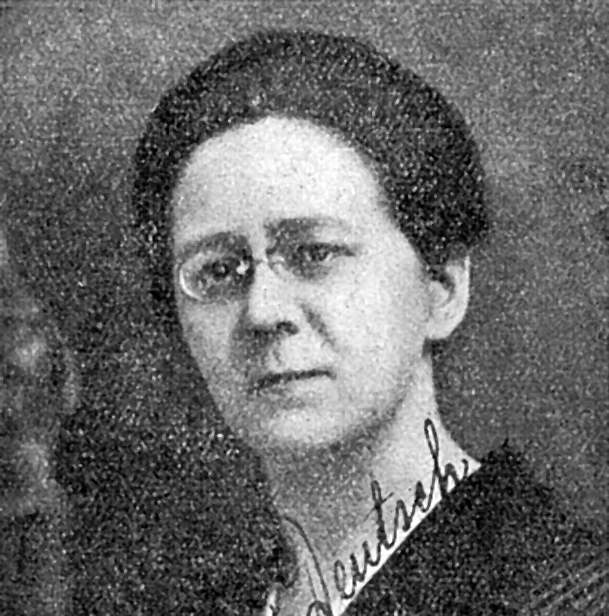

Member of the Chamber of Deputies
- In office 1920–1925

Personal details
- Born: 13 November 1882 Vienna, Austria-Hungary
- Died: 18 April 1969 (aged 86) Cambridge, United States

Maria Deutsch (13 November 1882 – 18 April 1969) was a Czechoslovak politician. In 1920, she was one of the first group of women elected to the Chamber of Deputies.

== Biography ==
Deutsch was born Maria Scharf in Vienna in 1882 to a Jewish family. After leaving school at the age of 14 she worked as a seamstress. Aged 16 she moved to Saint Petersburg, where she worked in a theatre for two years. She relocated to Prague in 1905 to work in the New German Theatre. In Prague she joined the Social Democratic Workers' Party of Austria and became editor of the party magazines Sozialdemokratin and Gleichheit. She married Moritz Deutsch, with whom she had a son, Karl, in 1912.

Following the independence of Czechoslovakia at the end of World War I Deutsch was a German Social Democratic Workers' Party candidate for the Chamber of Deputies in the 1920 parliamentary elections, and was one of sixteen women elected to parliament. After leaving parliament in 1925, she was an appointed member of the Czech Provincial Council from 1928 to 1935 and was a judge in the children's court in Prague. From 1933 she also helped German refugees fleeing the Nazi government.

After the Nazi occupation of Czechoslovakia Deutsch emigrated to Sweden in 1939, living in Malmö and Stockholm. In 1941 she relocated to New York City in the United States, where she worked in a factory until 1962. She died in Cambridge, Massachusetts in 1969.
