= Karl Deutsch Award =

The Karl Deutsch Award is awarded by the International Political Science Association (IPSA) each year an IPSA World Congress of Political Science is held. The recipient of the award presents the Karl Deutsch Lecture or leads a special session at the World Congress. The purpose of the award is to honour a prominent scholar engaged in cross-disciplinary research. It was named after the prominent political scientist Karl Deutsch. According to a reputation survey conducted in 2013 and 2014, it is the third most prestigious international academic award in political science, after the Johan Skytte Prize in Political Science and the Stein Rokkan Prize for Comparative Social Science Research.

The award should not be confused with the "Karl Deutsch Award" awarded by the International Studies Association. The latter award bears the same name but is only awarded to outstanding scholars under 40 in the field of international relations.

== History ==
The award was first awarded at the 1997 World Congress, in memory of Karl Deutsch, a leading political scientist and the president of IPSA from 1976 to 1979, who died in November 1992. The purpose of the Karl Deutsch Award is to honour a prominent scholar engaged in the cross-disciplinary research of which Karl Deutsch was a master.

== Nomination and award ==
Nominations are received through the IPSA national and regional associations, and a decision is made on the recommendation of the Committee on Awards of the Association. The recipient is awarded 1,000 U.S. dollars, which is supported by the Karl Deutsch fund.

== Recipients ==
The Karl Deutsch Award has been awarded to:

- 1997 Gabriel Almond
- 2000 Jean Laponce
- 2003 Juan Linz
- 2006 Charles Tilly
- 2009 Giovanni Sartori
- 2012 Alfred Stepan
- 2014 Pippa Norris
- 2016 Rein Taagepera
- 2018 Robert D. Putnam
- 2021 Jane Mansbridge
- 2023 John Coakley

== See also ==
- Politics
- Political science
