= Polarized pluralism =

Polarized pluralism is multi-party political system with a lot of established parties (at least five) that are far away on the political spectrum with sometimes irreconcilable agendas, presence of successful anti-system opposition, and "centrifugal pressure" from the center to the fringes.

The configuration was originally defined by political philosopher Giovanni Sartori. In this system, the moderate views are replaced by polarized views, leading to dysfunctional governments.

The term is typically used to describe highly unstable party systems of Weimar Germany, the French Fourth Republic, and the post-war Italian Republic. The phrase was also used by Roger Cohen, a jornalist writing in the New York Times to describe American politics about energy.

== Sources ==
- Cohen, Roger (2010-11-08). "Energy lessons". The New York Times. "Perhaps there's something to treadmill wisdom. We're all so narrow-band these days, using the vast resources of broadband to direct ourselves into a chosen ideological and news tunnel. Polarized pluralism defines us."
- Patton, David F. (Spring 2026). "Voting the Bums Out or Echoes of Weimar?: The FDP, Greens, AfD, Left Party, and BSW in the 2025 Bundestag Election" (PDF). German Politics and Society. 44 (1): 84–102. doi:10.3167/gps.2026.440105.
- Sartori, Giovanni (1976). "Competitive Systems". Parties and Party Systems: A Framework for Analysis. Vol. 1. Cambridge: Cambridge University Press. pp. 131–173.
