= İlter Turan =

Turkish academic (born 1941)

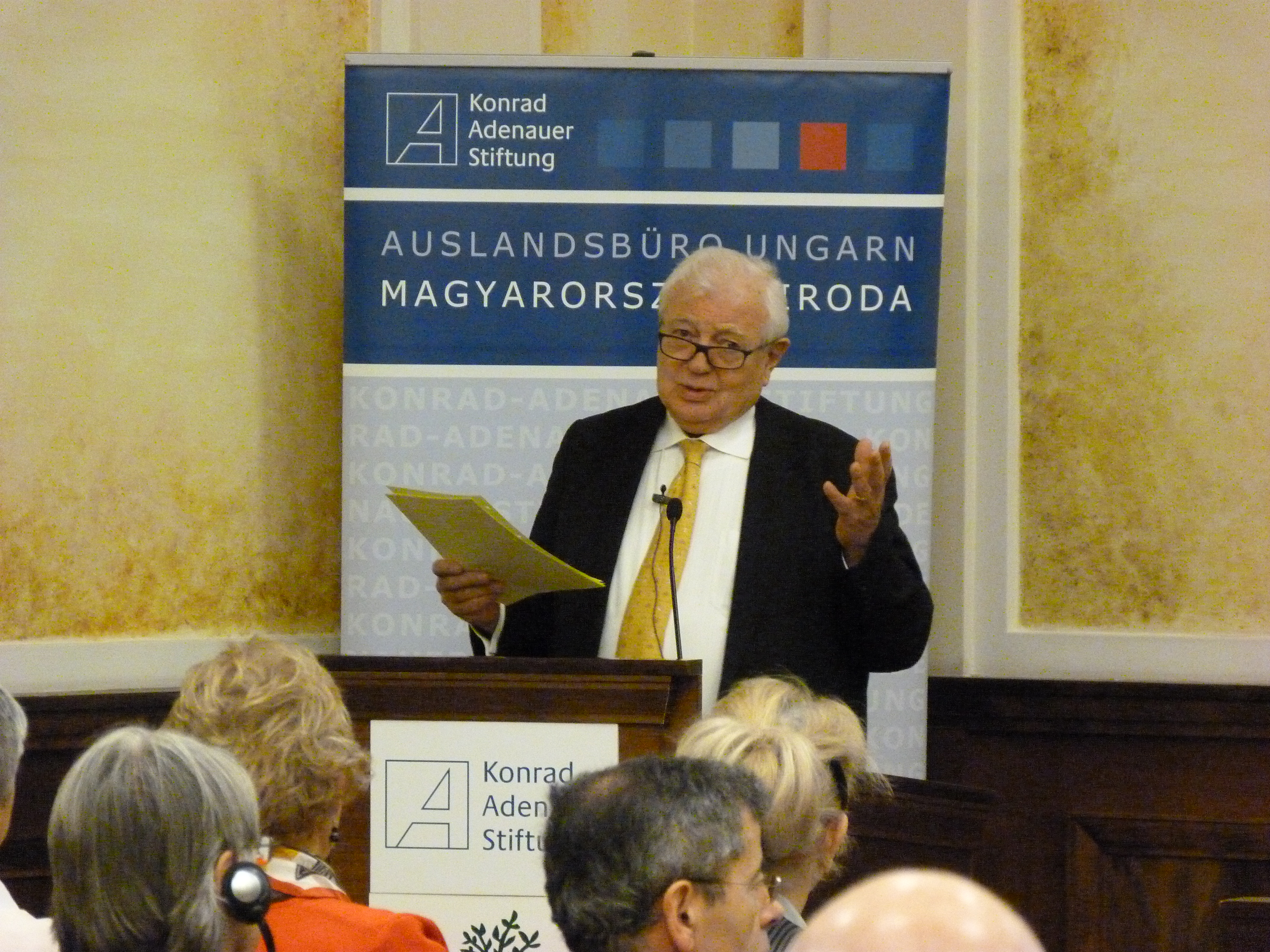
- Ilter Turan - 2015
- Born: 28 March 1941 (age 85)

Academic background
- Education: Columbia University, Istanbul University

Academic work
- Discipline: Political scientist
- Institutions: Istanbul Bilgi University, Turkey

Adil İlter Turan is a Turkish academic. He is a professor of Political Science in the Department of International Relations at Istanbul Bilgi University. He was Rector of the University from 1998 to 2001. He was the Program Chair of the 21st World Congress of Political Science, organized by the International Political Science Association (IPSA) in 2009.

İlter Turan was the president of International Political Science Association(IPSA) 2016-2018, the most prestigious international association of political science.
