= John Coakley =

Irish political scientist

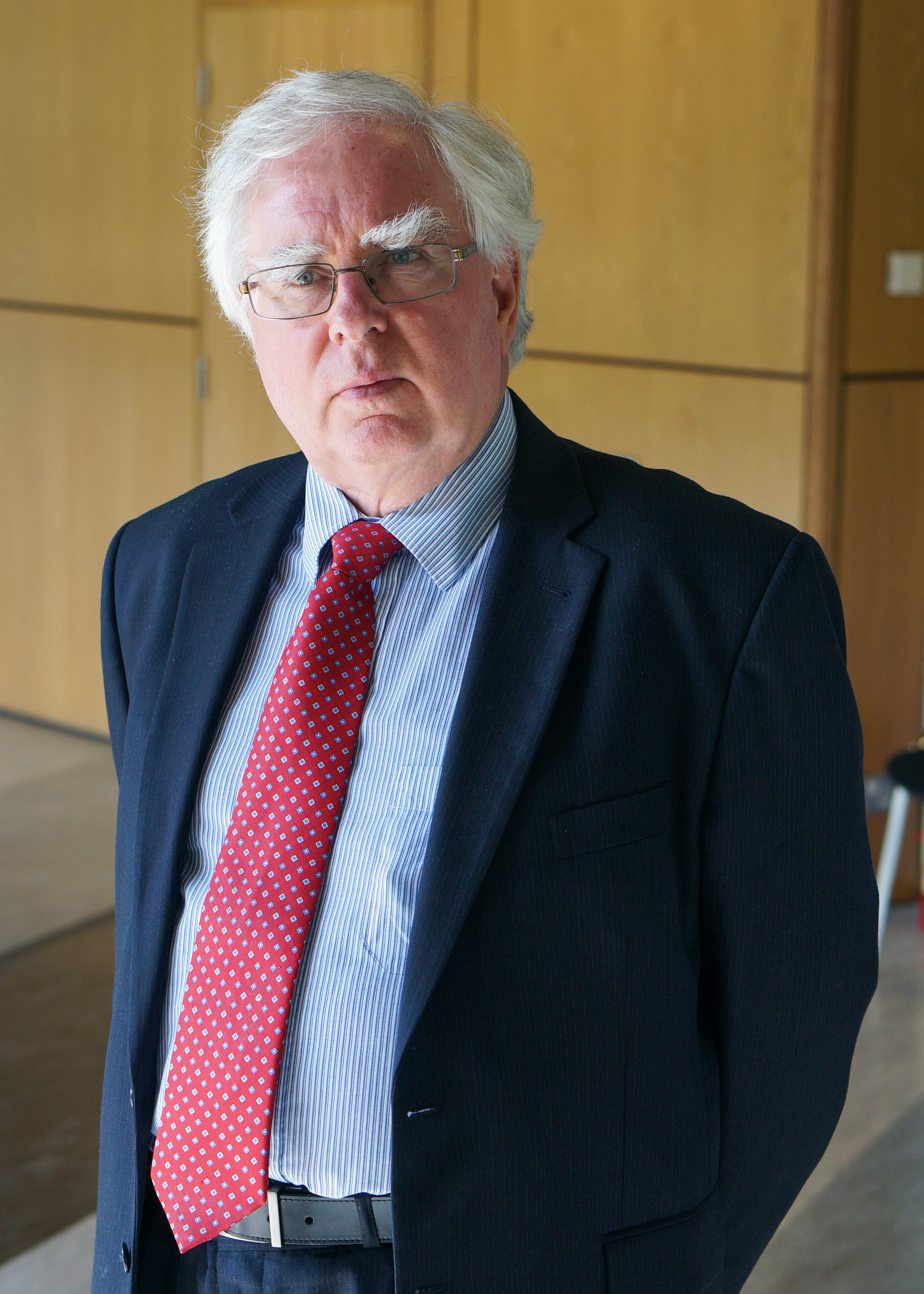
- Coakley in 2014
- Born: Claremorris, County Mayo, Ireland
- Education: University College Dublin (BA, MA)
- Occupation: Political scientist
- Awards: Karl Deutsch Award (2023)
- Scientific career
- Fields: Political science

John Coakley (born Claremorris, County Mayo) is an Irish political scientist. He is emeritus professor in the School of Politics & International Relations at University College Dublin, where he was formerly director of the Institute of British-Irish Studies. He also holds the title of distinguished international professor at Queen's University Belfast.

Coakley graduated with a BA in history and politics from University College Dublin in 1972, and also holds an MA in politics from UCD, awarded in 1974. In 2002, he was made Doctor of Letters in Politics by the National University of Ireland. He specialises in the study of Irish politics, comparative politics and ethnic conflict.

He was vice president of the International Social Science Council between 2002 and 2006, and was secretary general of the International Political Science Association from 1994 until 2000. He was a fellow at the Wilson Center from 2005 until 2006.

In July 2023, Coakley was the recipient of the International Political Science Association's Karl Deutsch Award, which recognises a prominent scholar engaged in cross-disciplinary research.

== Selected published works ==
- Negotiating a Settlement in Northern Ireland, 1969-2019 (with Jennifer Todd), Oxford University Press, 2020
- Politics in the Republic of Ireland, 6th ed. (co-edited with Michael Gallagher), Routledge, 2018
- Non-Territorial Autonomy in Divided Societies: Comparative Perspectives (edited), Routledge, 2017
- Breaking Patterns of Conflict: Britain, Ireland and the Northern Ireland Question (co-edited with Jenifer Todd), Routledge, 2015
- Reforming Political Institutions: Ireland in Comparative Perspective, Institute of Public Administration, 2013
- Nationalism, Ethnicity and the State: Making and Breaking Nations, Sage, 2012
- History of the International Political Science Association (with John Trent), International Political Science Association, 2000
- Handbook of the International Political Science Association, International Political Science Association, 2000
