= Multi-party system =

Political system with three or more parties

In political science, a multi-party system is a political system where more than two meaningfully distinct political parties regularly run for office and win offices (eg, membership in parliament) in elections. Multi-party systems tend to be more common in countries or jurisdictions (together, 'polities') which use proportional representation forms of election, compared to those that have implemented winner-take-all elections; this tendency is known as Duverger's law.

In multi-party countries or polities, usually no single party achieves at an election a parliamentary majority on its own (elections result in what are sometimes called hung parliaments). Instead, to craft a majority, multiple political parties must negotiate to form a coalition (also known as a 'minority government') which can command a majority of the votes in the relevant legislative organ of state (eg, parliamentary chamber). This majority is required in order to make laws, form an executive government, or conduct basically any of the necessary work of the parliament or the government (eg, to choose a president, elect parliamentary leadership, adopt a legislative agenda, or change rules of parliamentary procedure).

This tendency to not give sufficient power to one party to alone make significant changes—at least not without the support of other parties elected—tends to moderate governmental decision making in multi-party system jurisdictions; generally, it encourages negotiation over ideological purity, and more centrist, cooperative and compromising parties, governments and policies.

== Comparisons with other party systems ==
Unlike a one-party system (or a dominant-party system), a multi-party system encourages the general constituency to form multiple distinct, officially recognized groups or alignments-of-interest, generally called political parties. Each party, especially but not only during election campaigns, competes for votes from the enfranchised constituents (those allowed to vote) of the relevant polity. A multi-party system prevents the leadership of a single party from controlling a single legislative chamber, at least not without ongoing challenge from other 'opposition' or 'minor' or 'minority' parties.

A special case of a multi-party system where only two parties have a realistic possibility of winning an election is called a two-party system. A two-party system requires voters primarily to align themselves in (two) large blocks; these blocks are sometimes so large that they cannot agree internally on appropriate policies or even on overarching or organisational principles. Some theories argue that this gives centrists (including those in each of the two main blocks or parties) more opportunities to gain control, though this is disputed and depends largely on the features of elections (e.g., compulsory voting; political fundraising regulations) and institutions, and the tradition of rule of law, in the relevant polity. On the other hand, if there are multiple major parties, each with less than a majority of the vote, the parties are strongly motivated to work together, over time, to allow for the formation of working governments, or indeed any (democratically justifiable) government. Multi-party systems can also tend to promote centrism, privilege coalition-building, slow down or stymie major policy pivots, moderate policy adventurism, and discourage polarization, especially polarization of the leader of a coalition (polarization here referencing an ideological movement to the extremes, or 'poles' (edges), of political opinion by political parties—and thus by polities and their leaders).

== By country ==
Argentina, Armenia, Australia, Belgium, Brazil, Canada, Chile, Denmark, Finland, France, Germany, Iceland, India, Indonesia, Ireland, Israel, Italy, the Netherlands, New Zealand, Norway, the Philippines, Poland, Sweden, Turkey and Ukraine are examples of countries with multi-party systems.

== See also ==
- List of ruling political parties by country
- Polarized pluralism
- Political organisation
- Ingroups and outgroups
