= Leonardo Morlino =

Italian political scientist (1947–2025)

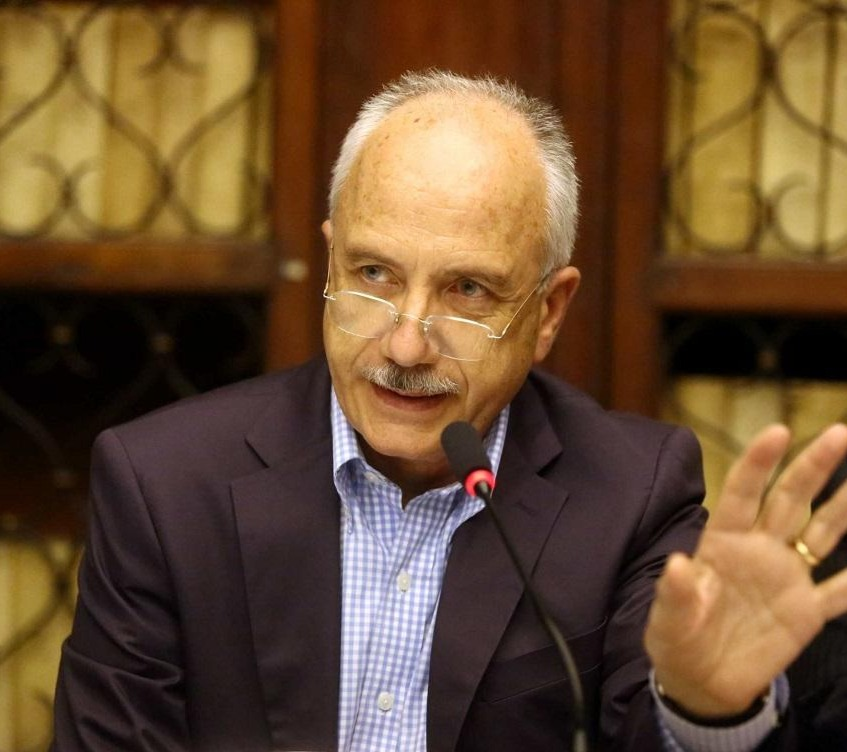

Leonardo Morlino (28 June 1947 – 18 June 2025) was an Italian political scientist, known for his work on democracy and democratization.

== Biography ==
He graduated in Political Science and specialized in comparative politics with Giovanni Sartori.

He has been Professor of Political Science at the Faculty of Political Science "Cesare Alfieri" of the University of Florence from 1971 to 2006. There, he served as Dean of the Faculty of Political Science from 1992 to 1995, and as Vice-Rector for Research and Deputy Rector from 2003 to 2006. He was also Director of the Interuniversity Research Center on Southern Europe (CIRES).

He has been Professor of Political Science at LUISS "Guido Carli" University from 2012 to 2018, later becoming Emeritus Professor of Political Science at the same university. There, he held the position of Vice-Rector for Research and contributed to the development of the Luiss School of Government.

He has been President of the Italian Political Science Association (SISP) from 1998 to 2001, and the first Italian President of the International Political Science Association (IPSA) from 2009 to 2012.

He has been a visiting professor at Stanford University, New York University, the Institut d'Études Politiques in Paris, the Centro de Estudios Políticos y Constitucionales and the Juan March Institute in Madrid, and a fellow at Nuffield College and Yale University.

During Pinochet's dictatorship, and throughout the democratic transition, Morlino actively participated in the work of the Centro de Estudios de la Realidad Contemporánea (CERC) in Santiago, Chile, directed by Carlos Huneeus, as well as in the meetings of the Vicaría de la Solidaridad, promoted by Cardinal Raúl Silva Henríquez. These two institutions played a decisive role in shaping the new Chilean democracy and in the training its future leaders.

He authored over 45 books and more than 230 journal articles and book chapters, on changes in political regimes, democratization processes, the quality of democracy, equality in contemporary democracies. They have been published in English, French, German, Spanish, Hungarian, Chinese, Mongolian, and Japanese.

His most recent books include Inequalities in European Democracies (Oxford University Press, forthcoming; with F. Raniolo); Equality, Freedom, and Democracy (Oxford University Press, 2020); Comparison: A Methodological Introduction for the Social Sciences (Barbara Budrich Publisher, 2018); The Impact of Economic Crisis on South European Democracies (Palgrave, 2017); How Economic Crisis Changes Democracy. Evidence from Southern Europe (Palgrave, 2017, with F. Raniolo); The Quality of Democracies in Latin America (International IDEA, 2016); Changes for Democracy: Actors, Structures, Processes (Oxford University Press, 2011); Democracias y Democratizaciones (CIS, 2008); International Actors, Democratization and the Rule of Law: Anchoring Democracy? (Routledge, 2008, with A. Magen); Democratization and the European Union. Comparing Central and Eastern European Post-Communist Countries (Routledge, 2010, with W. Sadurski); Introduzione alla ricerca comparata (Il Mulino, 2005) and Democracy Between Consolidation and Crisis. Parties, Groups, and Citizens in Southern Europe (Oxford University Press, 1998).

Morlino died on 18 June 2025, at the age of 77.

== The theory of anchoring ==
Morlino developed the theory of anchoring to understand how and why there can be democratic consolidation or democratic crisis, the processes of legitimation and of anchoring should be carefully explored. The key proposition is that to achieve consolidation with a limited legitimation strong anchors are needed. The main anchoring mechanisms we can empirically find are: party organization, clientelism, neo-corporatist arrangements, and party control of interests. Other possible anchors include: a strong leader, a successful tv channel, an internet networking skillfully managed. Likewise, there is an internal crisis of democracy when for a number of different reason the existing anchors fade away, i.e. there is a de-anchoring. In case of crisis this phenomenon is usually compounded by delegitimation in terms of dissatisfaction about the implemented policies or of a decisional stalemate.

== How to analyze democratic quality ==
According to Morlino a good democracy is, first of all, a regime widely legitimized and stable, where citizens are fully satisfied because the elected rulers are capable and able to respond to their needs and questions (quality as result). If institutions are still challenged, attention, energy will be absorbed by the needs and objectives of its consolidation or maintenance. In addition, its citizens and communities enjoy freedom and equality beyond the minimum(quality as content). Third, citizens of a good democracy must be able to monitor and evaluate it through elections (electoral accountability) or indirectly (mutual control among the institutions) if and how the two values of freedom and equality are achieved through the full compliance with the current rules, the so-called rule of law, their efficient implementation, effectiveness in decision-making along with the political responsibility for the choices made by elected elites in relation to the questions raised by the civil society (quality as procedure). Citizens, experts, scholars with different ideal conceptions of democracy can check which of the qualities listed above best suit their ideals and to what extent those qualities are implemented in a certain country at a certain time, using the empirical research conducted by Morlino.

== Prizes and awards ==
He has been awarded the Dartmouth Medal - Honorable Mention (Library Journal Best Reference 2011) for The International Encyclopedia of Political Science (Sage).

He held Doctorates Honoris Causa from the Universidad Mayor de San Andrés (UMSA) (La Paz, Bolivia), the Universidad Nacional Mayor de San Marcos (Lima, Peru), the University of Bucharest (Bucharest, Romania), the Universidad Autónoma de Guerrero (UAGRO), México.

Morlino has been the recipient of the Award for Scientific Achievements in Political Science by the Chilean Association of Political Science and of the Award for Academic Achievements and Contribution to the Development of Political Science by the Sociedad Argentina de Analisis Politico (Buenos Aires, Argentina).

He has been appointed Profesor Honorario of the Universidad Nacional de la Matanza (Buenos Aires, Argentina) and Honorary Member of Tunisian Association of Political Science, as well as life member of the International Political Science Association (IPSA) and of Mexican Association of Political Sciences (AMECIP).

He has been conferred the title of Huésped de Honor of the city of Buenos Aires (Argentina) and Visitante Distinguido of the city of Puebla (Mexico).

The Facultad de Derecho at the Universidad Autónoma de Querétaro in Mexico hosts a "Cátedra Leonardo Morlino sobre estudios de la democratización", dedicated to the analysis and reflection on democracy and democratization in Latin America and beyond.

== Books ==
Author:

10.2020 – Equality, Freedom and Democracy. Europe After the Great Recession, Oxford, Oxford University Press (Italian translation: Bologna, Il Mulino, 2021).

9.2018 – Comparison. An Methodological Introduction for the Social Sciences,Leverkusen and London, Barbara Budrich Publisher (Italian translation: Bologna, Il Mulino, 2020).

8.2014 – La calidad de las democracias en América Latina. Informe para IDEA (English translation: The Quality of Democracies in Latin America. A Report for IDEA, 2016) Stockholm, International IDEA.

7.2011 – Changes for Democracy. Actors, Structures and Processes, Oxford, Oxford University Press (reprinted 2012; Italian translation, 2014; Spanish translation 2019).

6.2005 – Introduzione alla ricerca comparata, Bologna, Il Mulino (Spanish translation 2010; French translation 2013).

5.2003 – Democrazie e democratizzazioni, Bologna, Il Mulino (first Spanish translation 2005, second Spanish edition 2009; Romanian transl. 2015).

4.1998 – Democracy Between Consolidation and Crisis. Parties, Groups, and Citizens in Southern Europe, Oxford, Oxford University Press (Italian translation: Bologna, Il Mulino, 2008).

3.1985 – Como cambian los regimenes politicos, Madrid, CEC (revised Spanish version of 1980 book).

2.1981 – Dalla democrazia all’autoritarismo. Il caso spagnolo in prospettiva comparata, Bologna, Il Mulino.

1.1980 – Come cambiano i regimi politici. Strumenti di analisi, Milan, Angeli Editore.

Co-author:

11.2026 (forthcoming) - Inequalities in European Democracies, Oxford, OUP

10. 2022 – Disuguaglianza e democrazia, Milan, Mondadori.

9.2022 – Per la partecipazione dei cittadini. Come ridurre l’astensionismo e agevolare il voto, Roma, Presidenza del Consiglio dei Ministri.

8.2017 – The Impact of the Economic Crisis on South European Democracies, London, Palgrave (Italian transl: Bologna, Il Mulino, 2018).

7.2017 – Political Science, Thousand Oaks and London, Sage Publications (Italian transl. 2018).

6.2009 – Qualità della Democrazia e Innovazione Locale, Padova, Edizioni Sapere.

5.2004 – Fondamenti di Scienza Politica, Bologna, Il Mulino.

4.2001 – Scienza Politica, Bologna, Il Mulino (new ed. 2008).

3.2001 – Rights and the Quality of Democracy in Italy. A Report, Stockolm, IDEA.

2.1990 – Le elezioni nel mondo 1982-1989, Florence, Edizioni della Giunta Regionale Toscana.

1.1986 – Manuale di Scienza della Politica, Bologna, Il Mulino (Spanish transl.: Madrid, Alianza Editorial, 1988).

Editor:

7. 2009 – Istituzioni, Partiti, e Società civile, by Seymour M. Lipset, Bologna, Il Mulino.

6.2000 – Transizione e consolidamento democratico, by J.J. Linz e A. Stepan, Italian translation, Bologna, Il Mulino.

5.1998 – Un’occasione mancata? Intervista sulle riforme costituzionali to Giovanni Sartori, Bari, Laterza.

4.1997/2004 – Partiti e sistemi di partito in Italia. Le trasformazioni organizzative, 4 voll., Bologna, Il Mulino.

3.1995 – Laurea in Scienze Politiche. Identità e sbocchi professionali, Firenze, Editrice La Giuntina.

2.1991 – Costruire la democrazia. Gruppi e partiti in Italia, Bologna, Il Mulino.

1.1989 – Scienza Politica, Turin, Edizioni della Fondazione Agnelli.

Co-editor:

23.2021 – L’illusione della scelta. Come manipolare l’opinione pubblica in Italia, with Michele Sorice, Roma, Luiss University Press.

22.2020 – The Politics of the Eurozone Crisis in Southern Europe. A Comparative Reappraisal, with C. Sottilotta, London, Palgrave Macmillan (Italian translation: Bologna, Il Mulino, 2020).

21.2020 – Calidad de la democracia en América Latina. Una nueva mirada, with Gloria de la Fuente and Marianne Kneuer, Santiago (Chile), Fondo de Cultura Económica.

20.2020 – Polarización, radicalización y populismo, with Marcelo Cavarozzi and Juan Russo, a special issue of Revista Euro latinoamericana de Análisis Social y Político (RELASP), 1 (1).

19.2020 – Handbook of Political Science, with Dik Berg-Schlosser and Bertrand Badie, Thousand Oaks and London, Sage Publications, 3 vols.

18.2020 – The politics of the Eurozone crisis in Southern Europe: A comparative reappraisal, with Cecilia Sottilotta, London, Palgrave MacMillan (Italian transl: Bologna, Il Mulino, 2020).

17.2017 – Calidad de la Democracia en América Latina, Curitiba (Brazil), Editora CRV.

16.2015 – The American Exceptionalism Revisited, Rome, Viella.

15.2013 – La qualità della democrazia in Italia, Bologna, Il Mulino.

14. 2011 – The quality of Democracy in Asia Pacific, with Björn Dressel Riccardo Pelizzo, a special issue of International Political Science Review, Thousand Oaks and London, Sage Publications.

13.2011 – Dealing with the Legacy of Authoritarianism: The ‘Politics of Past’ in Southern European Democracies. Comparative Perspectives, London, Routledge (paperback ed. 2013).

12.2011 – International Encyclopedia of Political Science, with Bertrand Badie and Dirk Berg-Schlosser, Thousand Oaks and London, Sage Publications, 8 volls.

11.2010 – The ‘Politics of the Past’ in Southern European Democracies. Comparative Perspectives, a special issue of South European Society and Politics, 15 (3).

10.2010 – Democratization and the European Union. Comparing Central and Eastern European post-communist countries, London, Routledge.

9.2010 – Rule of Law and Democracy: Internal and External Issues, special issue of Comparative Sociology, vol. 9, no.1; also expanded ed., Rule of Law and Democracy: Inquiries into Internal and External Issues, Leiden and Boston, Brill.

8.2008 – International Actors, Democratization and the Rule of Law. Anchoring Democracy?, London and New York, Routledge (paperback ed. 2009).

7.2007 – Party Change in Southern Europe, London and New York, Routledge.

6.2006 – Partiti e caso italiano, Bologna, Il Mulino.

5.2006 – Europeizzazione e rappresentanza territoriale. Il caso italiano, Bologna, Il Mulino.

4.2005 – Assessing the Quality of Democracy. Theory and Empirical Analysis, Baltimore, The Johns Hopkins University Press (Mongolian translation 2007).

3.1994 – L’Italia fra crisi e transizione, Bari, Laterza.

2.1991 – La comparazione nelle scienze sociali, Bologna, Il Mulino (Spanish trans.: Madrid, Alianza Editorial, 1994).

1.1991 – Democrazia e partiti in America Latina, Milano, Angeli.

== Articles in Journals ==
107.2024 – "Contemporary Hybrid Regime”, in New Eastern Europe, 63 (5): pp. 14–18.

106.2023 – "Studiare la democrazia attraverso paradossi” in LMDP. La meraviglia del possibile, I (3): pp. 59–63.

105.2022 – "La crisi della democrazia USA: tra polarizzazione e politica internazionale”, in Nomos. Le attualità del diritto, 2:1-6.

104.2022 – "La sfida populista tra rivendicazionismo e richiami identitari”, with F. Raniolo, Nazioni e Regioni. Studi e ricerche sulla comunità immaginata, 19-20:11-30.

103.2021 – "Ripensare la rappresentanza: la manipolazione digitale” in Digital Politics, 1(1).

102.2020 – "¿Una nueva ola autoritaria? Radicalización y neopopulismos en Europa y América Latina”, with Juan Russo, in Revista Euro latinoamericana de Análisis Social y Político (RELASP), 1 (1): pp. 17–34.

101.2020 – "Crisi economica, disuguaglianza generazionale e conseguenze politiche”, with Francesco Raniolo, in SINAPPSI - Connessioni tra ricerca e politiche pubbliche, 9 (3):14-24.

101.2020 – "Neopopulismo y calidad de la democracia”, with Francesco Raniolo, in Estancias. In Revista de Investigación en Derecho y Ciencias Sociales, 1 (1), 15-52.

100.2019 – "Southern Europe and the Eurozone Crisis Negotiations: Preference Formation and Contested Issues”, with Cecilia Sottilotta, South European Society and Politics, 24(1):1-28.

99.2018 – "Las democracias en America Latina: un balance con consecuencias políticas”, in SocietàMutamentoPolitica. Rivista Italiana di Sociologia, 9 (17): 27-42.

98.2017 – "Why transitions to democracy fail? A tribute to Pietro Grilli”, in Italian Political Science, online, 1.09.

97.2016 – "What is the impact of the economic crisis on democracy? Evidence from Europe”, with Mario Quaranta, in International Political Science Review, 37 (5): 618-33.

96.2015 – "Qualidades da democracia: como analisá-las”, in Sociedade e Cultura, 18 (2):177-194.

95.2015 – "Dissenso e Magistratura”, in Questione Giustizia, 4:75-83.

94.2015 – "Transiciones democraticas: entre cuestiones teόricas y análisis empirico”, in Revista Española de Ciencia Política, 39:17-42.

93.2015 – "Transitions to Democracy. What Theory to Grasp Complexity?”, in Historein, 15(1): 13-31.

92.2015 – "Changes for Democracy: Are There Hibrid Regimes?”, Central European Political Science Review, 16 (60): 14-49.

91.2015 – "¿Como Analizar las calidades democraticas?”, in Revista Latinoamericana de Política Comparada, 10: 13-36.

90.2014 – "Economic Crisis in a Stalemated Democracy: The Italian Case”, with D. Piana, in American Behavioral Scientist, 58 (12):1657-1682.

89.2014 – "The Non-Procedural Determinants of Responsiveness”, with M. Quaranta, in West European Politics, 37 (2): 331–360.

88.2013 – "On Daron Acemoglu and James A. Robinson "Why Nations Fail”. A Politological Reading”, in Stato e Mercato, 33(3): 495-502.

87.2013 – "Linz: what have we learnt from him?”, in Italian Political Science (http://italianpoliticalscience.com), 8(2).

86.2013 – "The impossible transition and the unstable new mix: Italy 1992–2012”, in Comparative European Politics, 11(3): 337–359.

85.2012 – "Calidad Democrática entre Lίderes y Partidos”, in Revista Paraguaya de Sociología, 137: 43-66.

84.2011 – "Observando las diferentes calidades de la democracia”, in Revista Mexicana de Analisis Politico y Administracion Publica, 1(1): 9-48.

83.2011 – "Quality of Democracy in Asia-Pacific: Issues and Findings”, with R. Pelizzo, in The quality of democracy in Asia-Pacific, a special issue of International Political Science Review, 32 (5):491-511.

82.2011 – "Per non dimenticare Bentley: dai gruppi alle politiche”, in Rivista Italiana di Politiche Pubbliche, 10 (2): 397-406.

81.2011 – "Analyzing Democratic Qualities”, in Central European Political Science Review, 12 (44): 9-45.

80.2010 – "Authoritarian Legacies, Politics of Past, and Quality of Democracy in Southern Europe: Open Conclusions”, in South European Society and Politics, 15 (3): 507-529.

79.2010 – "Autorità e legittimità tra consolidamento e crisi”, in Rassegna Italiana di Sociologia, 51 (4): 571-598.

78. 2009 – "Legitimacy and the Quality of Democracy ", in International Social Science Journal, 60 (June):211-222.

77.2009 – "The Quality of Democracy: An Agenda for Future Research?” in Participation, 33 (2): 3-4

76.2009 – "La classificazione dei regimi politici: fondamenti teorici e sviluppi empirici”, in Quaderno dell’Associazione per gli studi e le ricerche parlamentari, 19: 75-88.

75.2009 – "Transition from democracy to democracy: is it possible in Italy?”, in Bulletin of Italian Politics, 1 (1): 7-27.

74.2009 – "The Quality of Democracies in Europe. A Research Report”, in Italian Political Science, 2 (3):1-6.

73.2009 – "La Calidad de la Democracia”, in Claves de Razón Prática, 193: 26-35.

72.2009 – "Are There Hybrid Regimes? Or Are They Just An Optical Illusion?” in European Political Science Review, 1 (2):273-96.

71.2008 – "¿Regímenes Híbridos o Regímenes en Transición?”, in Sistema, 207: 3-22.

70.2008 – "Democracia, Calidad, Seguridad: Presupuestos Y Problemas”, in Sistema, 203-204: 21-34.

69.2008 – "Regimi Ibridi o regimi in transizione?” in Rivista Italiana di Scienza Politica, 38 (2): 169-190.

68.2008 – "Democracy and Changes: How Research Tails Reality”, in West European Politics, 31(1-2): 40-59.

67.2007 – "Explicar la calidad democrática: ¿qué tan relevantes son las tradiciones autoritarias?”, in Revista de Ciencia Política, 27 (2), 3-22.

66.2007 – "La qualità della democrazia: presupposti e problemi teorici”, in Quaderno dell’ Associazione per gli studi e le ricerche parlamentari. Seminario 2006, 17: 129-41.

65.2006 – (co-author), "What Changes in South European Parties. A Comparative Introduction”, in Party Change in Southern Europe, a double special issue of South European Society and Politics, 11 (3-4): 331-358.

64.2006 – (coauthor), "Europeanization and Territorial Representation in Italy”, in West European Politics, 29 (4): 757-783.

63.2006 – (coauthor), "Européisation et représentation territoriale en Italie”, in Pôle Sud, 24 (1): 99-120.

62.2005 – "Anchors, Anchoring and Democratic Change”, Comparative Political Studies, 38 (7): 743-770. (Spanish transl.: "Anclaje institucional y consolidaciόn democrática”, in Temas Selectos de la Teoria Politica Contemporanea, edited by Gabriel Pérez, Ediciones Eόn, Mexico City, 2013)

61.2005 – "Spiegare la qualità democratica: quanto sono rilevanti le tradizioni autoritarie?”, in Rivista Italiana di Scienza Politica, 25 (3): 191-212 .

60. 2004 – "Giappone e Italia: quale comparazione, quale teoria? Commento a ‘Machiavelli’s Children. Leaders and Their Legacies in Italy and Japan’ di Richard J. Samuels", in Rivista Italiana di Scienza Politica, 24 (2): 285-90.

59.2004 – "Alternativas No Democraticas” in Postdata. Revista de Reflexión y Análisis Político, December:149-183.

58.2004 – "The Quality of Democracy. An Overview”, with L. Diamond, special issue of Journal of Democracy, 15 (4): 20-31.

57.2004 – "What is a ‘Good’ Democracy?”, special issue of Democratization, 11(5): 10-32.

56.2004 – "’Good’ and ‘Bad’ Democracies: How to Conduct Research into the Quality of Democracy”, Journal of Communist Studies and Transition Politics, 20 (1): 5-27.

55.2003 – "What is a "Good” Democracy? Theory and the Case of Italy”, South European Society & Politics, 8 (3): 1-32.

54.2003 – ”Effets de l’Européanization sur la représentation politique en Europe du Sud”, Pole Sud, 19: 79-96.

53.2002 – "Democratic Anchoring: How to Analyze Consolidation and Crisis”, Central European Political Science Review, 3 (10): 6-39.

52.2002 – "Democrazia e spiegazioni”, Quaderno di Studi Parlamentari, Associazione per gli studi e le ricerche parlamentari, 13: 199-213.

51.2002 – "Crisi democratica e teoria dell’ancoraggio”, Quaderno di Studi Parlamentari, Associazione per gli studi e le ricerche parlamentari, 12: 101-118.

50.2001 – "Consolidamento Democratico: la teoria dell’ancoraggio”, Quaderni di Scienza Politica, 8 (2): 217-47.

49.2001 - "Consolidation Démocratique: La Théorie de l’Ancrage ”, Revue Internationale de Politique Comparée, 8 (2): 245-267.

48.2000 – "Consolidaciòn democratica: la teorìa del anclaje”, Revista Argentina de Ciencia Politica, 4: 9-34.

47.2000 – "Architectures constitutionelles et politiques democratiques en Europe de l’Est”, Revue FranVaise de Science Politique, 50 (4-5): 679-711.

46.2000 – "How we are or how we say that we are. The post-war comparative politics of Hans Daalder and others”, European Journal of Political Research, 37 (4): 497-516.

45.1998 - "Come siamo ovvero come ci raccontiamo. La politica comparata di Daalder, e altri (1945-1995)”, Rivista Italiana di Scienza Politica, 28 (3): 543-566.

44.1997 - "Is There an Impact? And Where is it? Electoral Reform and the Party System in Italy”, South European Society and Politics, 2 (3): 103-131.

43.1996 - "Crisis of Parties and Change of Party System in Italy”, Party Politics, 2 (1): 5-30.

42.1996 - "The Dissatisfied Society. Protest and Support in Italy”, with Marco Tarchi, European Journal of Political Research, 30 (1): 41-63.

41.1996 - "Democratic Consolidation and Convergence in Southern Europe: The Italian Case”, Democratization, 3 (3): 189-214.

40.1996 - "Legitimacy and Democracy in Southern Europe”, with José Ramon Montero, Revista Espanola de Investigaciones Sociologicas - English Edition, 1(1): 11-48.

39.1995 - "Consolidation and Party Government in Southern Europe”, International Political Science Review, 16 (2): 145-67.

38.1994 - "Legittimità, consolidamento e crisi nell’Europa Meridionale”, with José Ramon Montero, Rivista Italiana di Scienza Politica, 24 (1): 27-66.

37.1993 - "Legitimacion y democracia en el Sur de Europa”, with José Ramon Montero, in Revista Espanola de Investigaciones Sociologicas, 64: 7-40.

36.1992 - "Vecchio e nuovo autoritarismo nel Sud Europa”, with Franco Mattei, in Rivista Italiana di Scienza Politica, 22 (1): 137-60.

35.1992 - "Political Science in Italy: Tradition and Empiricism”, in Political Science in Western Europe 1960-90, special issue of the European Journal of Political Research, 20 (2): 341- 358.

34.1992 - "I partiti nella transizione”, Società e politica in America Latina, special issue of Views, 2: 19-34.

33.1992 - "Consolidaçoes democraticas. Indicaçoes teoricas para anàlise empirica”, in Dados, 35 (2): 145-171.

32.1992 - "Partidos, grupos y consolidaciòn democratica in Italia”, in Revista del Centro de Estudios Constitucionales, 13 (Sep.-Dec.): 73-102.

31.1991 - "La scienza politica italiana: tradizione e realtà”, Rivista Italiana di Scienza Politica, 21(1): 70-102.

30.1990 - "Problemi e scelte nella comparazione”, Rivista Italiana di Scienza Politica, 20 (3): 381-395.

29.1988 - "Individui, gruppi e rappresentanza nelle democrazie attuali”, Rassegna dell’Economia Lucana, 26 (1): 21-43.

28.1986 - "Le elezioni nel mondo. Gennaio-dicembre 1985”, Quaderni dell’Osservatorio Elettorale, 16: 105-27.

27.1986 - "Consolidamento democratico. Definizione e modelli”, Rivista Italiana di Scienza Politica, 16 (2): 197-238.

26.1986 - "Sei nuove democrazie sfidano il passato”, Biblioteca della Libertà, 21(Jan.-March): 83-90.

25.1986 - "Consolidamento democratico: alcune ipotesi esplicative”, Rivista Italiana di Scienza Politica, 16 (3): 439-459.

24.1986 - "Consolidacion democratica. Definicion, modelos, hipothesis”, Revista Espanola de Investigaciones Sociologicas, 35: 7-61.

23.1985 - "Le elezioni nel mondo. Luglio-dicembre 1984”, Quaderni dell’Osservatorio Elettorale, 14: 131-43.

22.1985 - "Il sistema politico. Uno strumento per capire?”, Mondoperaio, 38 (6).

21.1985 - "Consolidacion democratica: definicion y modelos”, Contribuciones - CIEDLA, 1: 37-43.

20.1985 - "?Cual es la crisis democratica de Italia?”, Critica y Utopia, 13: 65-106.

19.1984 - "Le elezioni nel mondo. Luglio-dicembre 1983”, Quaderni dell’Osservatorio Elettorale, 12: 87-99.

18.1984 - "The Changing Relationships Between Parties and Society in Italy”, West European Politics, 7 (4): 46-66.

17.1984 - "Le elezioni nel mondo. Gennaio-giugno 1984”, Quaderni dell’Osservatorio Elettorale, 13: 109-19.

16.1984 - "Toward Democracy in Latin America: A Model with Several Variables”, Politica Internazionale, Engl. ed., 2:77-90.

15.1983 - "Le elezioni nel mondo. Luglio-dicembre 1982”, Quaderni dell’Osservatorio Elettorale, 10: 93-108.

14.1983 - "Etiology and Outcomes of Protest”, with Keith Webb et al., American Behavioral Scientist, 27 (3): 311-331.

13.1983 - "Le elezioni nel mondo. Gennaio-giugno 1983”, Quaderni dell’Osservatorio Elettorale, 11: 97-118.

12.1983 - "Un modello a più variabili”, Dossier: La transizione in America Latina, special issue of Politica Internazionale, 6: 53-64.

11.1982 - "Una democrazia fragile: la Spagna”, Mondoperaio, 35(9).

10.1982 - "Le elezioni nel mondo. Gennaio-giugno 1982”, Quaderni dell’Osservatorio Elettorale, 9: 180-94.

9.1981 - "Spagna: il ruolo della monarchia”, Mondoperaio, 34(5).

8.1979 - "La crisi della democrazia”, Rivista Italiana di Scienza Politica, 9 (1): 37-70.

7.1979 - "Regimi politici e libertà”, La democrazia nel mondo. Un censimento, special issue of Biblioteca della Libertà, 16 (74-75): 5-26.

6.1975 - "Misure di democrazia e di libertà: discussione di alcune analisi empiriche”, Rivista Italiana di Scienza Politica, 5(1): 132-66.

5.1975 - "Categorie e dimensioni del mutamento politico”, Rivista Italiana di Scienza Politica, 5 (2): 277-324.

4.1975 - "Crisi e mutamento politico”, Rivista Italiana di Scienza Politica, 5 (3): 545-61.

3.1973 - "Stabilità, legittimità ed efficacia decisionale nei sistemi democratici”, Rivista Italiana di Scienza Politica, 3 (2): 247-316.

2.1972 - "Alcuni sviluppi teorici nella scienza politica americana”, Il Mulino, 220: 319-46.

1.1971 - "I limiti dell’eredità di Gobetti”, Biblioteca della Libertà, 8 (32): 51-67.

== Chapters in books ==
143.2025 – "Parties, Public Administration, and Their Changing Relationships”, in Public Administration in Italy in Societal and Historical Context. The Craft of the Italian State, edited by E. Ongaro, Carla Barbati, Fabrizio di Mascio, Francesco Longo, Alessandro Natalini, London, Palgrave, pp. 21–36.

142.2024 – "Democrazie oggi. E domani?”, in M.G. Amadio Viceré e Marco Brunazzo, eds., Democrazie e riforme: una prospettiva europea e globale. Scritti in onore di Sergio Fabbrini, Roma, LUISS

141.2024 – "Partiti, rappresentanza e istituzioni di governo”, in G. Amato, F. Bassanini, et al, eds., Crisi della democrazia rappresentativa, crisi dei partiti. Cosa possono fare i corpi intermedi per rivitalizzare la politica, Bologna, Il Mulino, pp. 83–108.

140.2024 – "Past legacies and autocratization”, in A. Croissant and L. Tomini, eds., The Routledge Handbook of Autocratization, London, Routledge.pp. 124–34.

139.2023 – "Conclusion”, with M. Llanos and L. Marsteintredet, in M. Llanos and L. Marsteintredet, eds., Latin America in Times of Turbulence. Presidentialism under Stress, New York and London, Routledge, pp. 206–20

138.2023 – "La crisi della democrazia USA: tra polarizzazione e politica internazionale”, in G. Amato and F. Lanchester, eds., La crisi della democrazia statunitense. Ragioni e prospettive, Milano, CEDAM-Wolters Kluwer, pp. 157–63.

137.2022 – "Democracy” in P. Harris, A. Bitonti, C.S.Fleisher, A. Skorkjaer Binderkrantz, eds., The Palgrave Encyclopaedia of Interest Groups, Lobbying and Public Affairs, London, Palgrave.

136.2022. "Los mecanismos sociales de la pandemia y sus consecuencias" in Juan Russo (Ed) A marchas forzadas. Mecanismos sociales y democracia en épocas de pandemia, Buenos Aires, Prometeo.

135.2021 – "Hybrid Regimes”, in A. Sajo, S. Holmes, R. Uitz, eds., Routledge Handbook of Illiberalism, New York and London, Routledge.

134.2021 – "Conclusioni. Quello che abbiamo appreso”, with Michele Sorice, in L. Morlino and Michele Sorice, eds., L’illusione della scelta. Come manipolare l’opinione pubblica in Italia, with Michele Sorice, Roma, Luiss University Press.

133.2021 – "Introduzione. Concetti, meccanismi, ipotesi”, in L. Morlino and Michele Sorice, eds., L’illusione della scelta. Come manipolare l’opinione pubblica in Italia, with Michele Sorice, Roma, Luiss University Press.

132.2021 – "Introduzione. Per leggere Azione Politica”, in M. Walzer, Azione Politica, Roma, Luiss University Press, pp. 13–30.

131. 2020 –"Populism and Democracy in Europe”, with Davide Vittori, in D. Albertazzi and D. Vampa, eds., Populism and New Patterns of Political Competition in Western Europe, London, Routledge.

130.2020 – "Policy Responsiveness and Democratic Quality”, in M. Cotta and F. Russo, eds., Research Handbook on Political Representation, London, Edward Edgar Publisher, pp. 48–57.

129.2020 – "Neo-Populism and Subversion of Democratic Quality” (with F. Raniolo), in Paul Blokker and Manuel Anselmi eds., Multiple Populisms. Italy as Democracy’s Mirror, London, Routledge, pp. 31–49.

128.2019 – 2019 – "Introduction” (with Cecilia Sottilotta), to The politics of the Eurozone crisis in Southern Europe: A comparative reappraisal, edited with Cecilia Sottilotta, London, Palgrave Macmillan, pp. 1–11.

127.2019 – "Grande Recessione e Democrazia. Dieci anni dopo l’inizio”, in G. Allegretti, L. Fasano, M. Sorice, eds., Politica oltre la politica, Milano, Feltrinelli, pp-39-49.

126.2019 – ” Parties and Democracies in Southern Europe after the ‘Great Recession’” in Anne Weyembergh, Jean-Michel De Waele, Giovanni Grevi, Frederik Ponjaert, eds., Rethinking the European Union and its Global Role from the 20th to the 21st Century. Liber Amicorum Mario Telò, vol. 2: Reflections on the Future of Social Democracy in Europe, Bruxelles, Editions de l’Université de Bruxelles, pp. 25-35.

125.2019 – "Democratic Consolidation”, in W. Merkel, R. Kollmorgen, H-J. Wagener, eds., The Handbook of Political, Social, and Economic Transformation, Oxford, Oxford University Press.

124.2018 – "Le XXI siècle, thèâtre d’un changement du climat politique international? La democratie face à l’auticrazia, with D. Berg-Schlosser, in Un monde fragmenté. Autour de la sociologie des Relations internationales de Bertrand Badie, edited by D. Allès, R. Malejacq, S.Paquin, Paris, CNRS Éditions, pp.201-18.

123.2018- "Las democracias en América Latina, un balance con consecuencias políticas" in J. Russo (Ed) Rethinking (democracy in) Latin America, Societá, Mutamento e Política, vol 9, 17. pp. 27–43

122.2018 – "Economic Crisis and Democracy: How to Analyze the Impact of the former on the latter”, in L. Tomini and G. Sandri, eds., Challenges of Democracy in the 21st Century, London, Routledge, pp. 88–104.

121.2017 – "SARTORI, Giovanni”, in Dizionario Biografico degli Italiani, Roma, Treccani.

120.2017 – "Wirtschaftskrise und Demokratie: Eine Wirkungsanalyse”, in A. Croissant, S. Kneip, A. Petring eds., Demokratie, Diktatur; Gerechtigkeit. Festschrift für Wolfgang Merkel, Wiesbaden, Springer, pp. 447–66.

119.2016– "La qualità della democrazia e il cambiamento politico”, in E. Mannari (ed.), Lezioni sulla democrazia, Milano, Mondadori, pp. 35–43.

118.2016 – "¿Cómo Analizar las Calidades Democráticas?”, in C. Dominguez Avila (ed.), A Qualidade da Democracia no Brasil: Questöes Teόricas e Metodόlogicas da Pequisa, vol. 1, Curitiba (Brazil), Editora CRV, pp. 19–46.

117. 2016 – "Conclusion - What have we learnt, and where do we go from here?”, with Hanspeter Kriesi, in M. Ferrin and H.Kriesi eds., How Europeans View and Evaluate Democracy, Oxford, Oxford University Press, pp. 307–25.

116.2016 – "El impacto de la crisis económica en la democracia española: un marco analítico”, in Francisco J. Llera Ramo, ed., Desafecciόn Política y Regeneraciόn Democratica en la España Actual: Diagnosticos y Propuestas, Madrid, Centro de Estudios Políticos y Constitucionales, pp. 31–47.

115.2015 – "Introduction”, in M. Fantoni and L. Morlino eds., The American Exceptionalism Revisited, Rome, Viella, pp. 11–22.

114. 2015 – "What Qualities of Democracy in Latin America? Mixing quantitative and qualitative analyses”, in Carlos Dominguez Avila, ed., Política, Cultura e Sociedade na América Latina. Estudos interdisciplinares e comparativos, Rio de Janeiro, Editora CRV.

113.2014 – "Linz: what have we learnt from him?”, in Juan J. Linz: Scholar, Teacher, Friend, edited by H.E. Chehabi, Cambridge, Tў Aur Press, pp. 284–90.

112. 2014 – "La democracia, su consolidación y Una vida difícil en Italia”, in M. Alcantara y S. Mariani (editores), La politica va al cine, Lima, Universidad del Pacifico.

111. 2014 – "Transizione in stallo e conseguente instabilità”, in La transizione politica italiana. Da Tangentopoli a oggi, edited by M. Almagisti, L. Lanzalaco, L. Verzichelli, Roma, Carocci, pp. 197– 221.

110.2013 – "Do authoritarian legacies account for quality of democracy? Additional remarks on Southern Europe”, in Ciências Sociais: Vocação e Profissão. Homagem a Manuel Villaverde Cabral, edited by Pedro Alcantara da Silva and Filipe Carreira da Silva, Lisboa, Imprensa de Ciêencias Sociais, pp. 413–432.

109.2013 – "Legados Autoritários, política do passado e qualidade da Democracia na Europa do Sul”, in O passado que não passa. A sombra das ditaduras na Europa do Sul e na America Latina, edited by Antόnio Costa Pinto e Francisco Carlos Palomanes Martinho, Rio de Janeiro, Editora Civilização Brasileira, pp. 261–294.

108.2013 – "L’impossible transition et le nouveau compromis instable: l’Italie de 1992 à 2012”, in L’état de la démocratie en Italie, edited by Mario Telò, Giulia Sandri and Luca Tomini, Editions de l’Université de Bruxelles, pp. 69–87.

107.2012 – "Epitafio para un enfoque exitoso: El sistema politico”, in Repensar la Ciencia Polίtica, edited by Jorge Sánchez and Juan Russo, Mexico, Instituto Electoral del Estado de Guerrero, pp. 97–124.

106.2011 – "Hybrid Regimes”, in International Encyclopedia of Political Science, edited by Bertrand Badie, Dirk Berg-Schlosser, Leonardo Morlino, Beverly Hills and London, Sage Publications, 8 volls.

105.2011 – "Democracy, Quality”, in International Encyclopedia of Political Science, edited by Bertrand Badie, Dirk Berg-Schlosser, Leonardo Morlino, Beverly Hills and London, Sage Publications, 8 volls.

104.2011 – (coauthor) "Political Science”, in International Encyclopedia of Political Science, edited by Bertrand Badie, Dirk Berg-Schlosser, Leonardo Morlino, Beverly Hills and London, Sage Publications, 8 volls.

103.2011 – "A Demokrácia Minöségi Elemeinek Vizsgálata”, in Simon János, ed., Húsz Ėve Szabadon Közép-Európàdan, Nyomda, Konrad Adenauer Alapítvány, pp-58-81.

102.2010 – (co-author), "La qualità della democrazia in Italia. Tra leader e partiti”, in M. Castagna, ed., Uscire dalla Seconda Repubblica, Roma, Carocci, pp. 58–80.

101.2010 – "Are There Hibrid Regimes? Or Are They Just An Optical Illusion”, in E. Baracani, ed., Democratization and Hybrid Regimes. International Anchoring and Domestic Dynamics in European Post-Soviet States, Florence, European Press Academic Publishing, pp. 25–55.

100.2010 – "Democratization Theory, Quality of Democracy, and Survey Research. Still Separated Tables?” in J. A. Moises, ed., Democracia e Confiança: Por que os Cidadãos Desconfiam das Instituições Públicas?, Sao Paulo, Editora da USP, pp. 23–44.

99.2010 – (co-author), "Introduction”, in Democratization and the European Union: Comparing Central and Eastern European Post-Communist Countries, edited by L. Morlino and W. Sadurski, London, Routledge, pp. 1–15.

98.2010 – (coauthor), "Conclusions”, in L. Morlino and W. Sadurski, eds., Democratization and the European Union: Comparing Central and Eastern European Post-Communist Countries, London, Routledge, 2010, pp. 216–41.

97.2010 – "The Two 'Rules of Law' Between Transition to and Quality of Democracy” in L. Morlino and G. Palombella, eds., Rule of Law and Democracy: Inquiries into Internal and External Issues, Leiden and Boston, Brill, 2010, p. 39-64

96.2009 – "Calidad democrática entre líderes y partidos”, in Carmen Maganda and Harlan Koff, eds., Perspectivas Comparativas del Liderazgo, Brussels, P.I.E. Peter Lang, pp. 25–47.

95.2009 – "Introduzione. Lipset teorico della democrazia, non solo americana.” in Seymour M. Lipset, Istituzioni, Partiti, e Società civile, edited by L. Morlino, Bologna, Il Mulino, pp. 7–37.

94.2009 – "¿Regimenes híbridos o regimenes en transición?”, in Alfonso Guerra and José Felix Tezanos, eds., La Calidad de la Democracia. Las Democracias del Siglo XXI, Madrid, Editorial Sistema, pp. 135–160.

93.2009 – "Democracy and Changes: How Research Tails Reality”, in Klaus H. Goetz, Peter Mair and Gordon Smith, eds., European Politics. Pasts, Presents, Futures, London and New York, Routledge, pp. 40-59.

92.2009 – "Political Parties”, in Christian W. Haerpfer, Patrick Bernhagen, Ronald F. Inglehart, Christian Welzel and, eds., Democratization, Oxford, Oxford University Press, 2009, pp. 201–18.

91.2009 – "Prolusione: Democrazia, Qualità, Sicurezza: Presupposti e Problemi”, in Annuario della Scuola di Perfezionamento per le Forze di Polizia, anno accademico 2007-2008, Roma, Scuola di Perfezionamento per le Forze di Polizia, pp. 48–71.

90.2008 – "Preface” (with A. Magen), in International Actors, Democratization and the Rule of Law: Anchoring Democracy?, edited by A. Magen and L. Morlino, London, Routledge, pp. xii-xvi..

89.2008 – "Hybrid Regimes, the Rule of Law, and External Influence on Domestic Change” (with A. Magen), in International Actors, Democratization and the Rule of Law: Anchoring Democracy?, edited by A. Magen and L. Morlino, London, Routledge, pp. 1–25.

88.2008 – (co-author) "Methods of Influence, Layers of Impact, Cycles of Change: A Framework for Analysis”, in International Actors, Democratization and the Rule of Law:Anchoring Democracy?, edited by A. Magen and L. Morlino, London, Routledge, pp. 26–52.

87.2008 – (co-author) "Scope, Depth and Limits of External Influence - Conclusions”, in International Actors, Democratization and the Rule of Law: Anchoring Democracy? edited by A. Magen and L. Morlino, London, Routledge, pp 224–58.

86.2008 – "Calidad Democrática Entre Lίderes y Partidos”, in Partidos Politicos y Calidad de la Democracia. Mexico, Serie Conferencias Magistrales, Instituto Federal Electoral, 11-56.

85.2008 – "Prefación” to Edgar Alfonso Hernández, Los Usos Politicos de la Pobreza. Politica Social y Cleintelismo Electoral en La Alternancia, Mexico, El Colegio Mexiquense, pp. 13–40.

84.2008 – "Régime hybrides ou régimes en transition?", in Mohammad-Saïd Darviche and William Genieys eds., Penser les régimes politiques, Paris, L'Harmattan, 2008, pp. 237–260.

83.2008 – "Institutional Theory and Comparative Democratization”, in J. Pierre, B. G. Peters, G. Stoker eds., Debating Institutionalism, Manchester, Manchester University Press, pp. 176–194.

82.2008 – "Hybrid Regimes or Regimes in Transition?”, in Essays in Honor of Ergun Ozbudun, vol.1: Political Science, Ankara, Yetkin Basim Yayim ve Dagitim A.Ş., pp. 347–373.

81.2008 – "Authoritarian Legacies and good democracy. Southern Europe”, in M. Petricioli, ed., L’Europe Mediterranéenne, Bruxelles, P.I.E. Peter Lang, pp. 123–140.

80.2008 – "Democratizzazione", in M. Flores, ed., Diritti Umani, Torino, UTET.

79.2008 – "Democrazia", in M. Flores, ed., Diritti Umani, Torino, UTET.

78.2008 – "Regimi di transizione", in M. Flores, ed., Diritti Umani, Torino, UTET.

77.2008 – "Democratizzare la democrazia”, in G. Vittadini, ed., La Verità, il Nostro Destino, Milano, Mondadori, pp. 209–13.

76.2007 – "La transizione impossibile?”, in R. D’Alimonte e A. Chiaramonte eds., Proporzionale ma non solo. Le elezioni politiche del 2006, Bologna, Il Mulino, pp. 11–50.

75.2007 – "Comunicare quali riforme” in AA.VV, Sussidarietà e Riforme Istituzionali. Rapporto sulla Sussidarietà 2007, Milano, Mondadori, pp. 23–27;

74.2007 – "Quality and Qualities in Contemporary Democracies”, in J. Marcet and J. R. Montero, eds., Roads to Democracy. A Tribute to Juan J. Linz, Barcelona, Institut de Ciències Polítiques i Socials, pp. 125–150.

73.2007 – "Calidad de la democracia. Notas para su discusion”, in C. Cansino and I. Covarrubias eds., Por una democracia de calidad. Mexico después de la transiciớn, Mexico, Centro de Estudios de Politica Comparada, pp. 27–53.

72.2007 – (co-author), "What Changes in South European Parties. A Comparative Introduction”, in Party Change in Southern Europe, London, Routledge, pp. 1–28.

71.2006 – (coauthor), "Introduzione. Europeizzazione e rappresentanza: Perché i fondi strutturali”, in V. Fargion, L. Morlino, S. Profeti eds., Europeizzazione e rappresentanza territoriale. Il Caso Italiano, Bologna, Il Mulino, pp. 11–60 .

70.2006 – (coauthor), "Conclusioni. I risultati della ricerca” in V. Fargion, L. Morlino, S. Profeti eds., Europeizzazione e rappresentanza territoriale. Il Caso Italiano, Bologna, Il Mulino, 2006, pp. 361–389.

69.2006 – (coauthor), "Introduzione”, in L. Morlino and Marco Tarchi eds., Partiti e caso italiano, Bologna, Il Mulino, pp. 7–15.

68.2006 – "Qualità democratica tra leader e partiti”, in L. Morlino and Marco Tarchi eds., Partiti e caso italiano, Bologna, Il Mulino, pp. 85–102.

67.2006 – "Le tre fasi dei partiti italiani”, in L. Morlino and Marco Tarchi eds., Partiti e caso italiano, Bologna, Il Mulino, pp. 105–144.

66.2006 – (coauthor), "La società insoddisfatta e i suoi nemici. I partiti nella crisi italiana”, in L. Morlino and Marco Tarchi eds., Partiti e caso italiano, Bologna, Il Mulino, pp. 207–244.

65.2006 - "’Good’ and ‘Bad’ Democracies: How to Conduct Research into the Quality of Democracy”, in Derek S. Hutcheson and Elena A. Korosteleva eds., The Quality of Democracy in Post-Communist Europe, London and New York, Routledge, pp. 5–27.

64.2005 - (coauthor), "Introduction”, in L. Diamond and L. Morlino eds., Assessing the Quality of Democracy. Theory and Empirical Analysis, Baltimore, Johns Hopkins University Press, pp.ix-xliii.

63.2005 – (co-author), "Italy and Spain”, in L. Diamond and L. Morlino eds., Assessing the Quality of Democracy. Theory and Empirical Analysis, Baltimore, Johns Hopkins University Press, 2005, pp. 85–122.

62.2005 – "Conclusão: a europeazação da Europa do Sul” in A. Costa Pinto, N. Severiano Teixeira eds., A Europa do Sul e a construção europeia de 1945 aos anos 80, Lisboa, Imprensa de Ciências Sociais, pp. 197–215.

61.2004 – "Problematizing the Links Between Authoritarian Legacies and ‘Good’ Democracy” (with K. Hite), in P. Cesarini and K. Hite eds., Democracy and Authoritarian Legacies in Southern Europe and Latin America, Notre Dame, University of Notre Dame Press, pp. 25–83.

60.2003 - "Politica comparata e teoria istituzionale”, in A. Baldissera (ed.), La Comparazione, Milano, Angeli, pp. 89–108.

59.2002 - "The Europeanization of Southern Europe”, in A. Costa Pinto and N.S. Texeira eds., Southern Europe and the Making of the European Union 1945-1980s, New York, Columbia University Press, pp. 237–260.

· 58.2001 – "The Three Phases of Italian Parties”, in L. Diamond and R. Gunther, eds., Political Parties and Democracy, Baltimore, The Johns Hopkins University Press, pp. 109–142.

57.2001 – "Leggi elettorali e democrazia. Dalla comparazione sincronica a quella diacronica”, in VV.AA., Il Parlamento, Padova, CEDAM, pp. 17–47.

56.2001 – "Democracy, Southern European Style?”, with A. Lijphart et al., in N. P. Diamandouros and R. Gunther, eds., Parties, Politics, and Democracy in the New Southern Europe, Baltimore, The Johns Hopkins University Press, pp. 16–82.

55.2001 – "Constitutional Design and Problems of Implementation in Southern and Eastern Europe”, in J. Zielonka, ed., Democratic Consolidations in Eastern Europe, Oxford, Oxford University Press.

54.2000 - "Sistema Politico”, in Appendice 2000. Enciclopedia Italiana, Rome, Istituto dell’Enciclopedia Italiana, pp. 680–683.

53.2000 - "Scienza della Politica”, in Appendice 2000. Enciclopedia Italiana, Rome, Istituto dell’Enciclopedia Italiana, pp. 432–434.

52.2000 – "Introduzione all’edizione italiana”, in J.J. Linz e A. Stepan, Transizione e consolidamento democratico, Bologna, Il Mulino, pp. VII-XVI.

51.2000 - "Constitutions and Good Democracy in Eastern Europe”, in Michel Dobry (ed.), Democratic and Capitalist Transitions in Eastern Europe. Lessons for the Social Sciences, Dordrecht/ Boston/London, Kluwer Academic Publishers, pp. 147–77.

50.1999 – "ITALY” in Implication of EC legislation at sub-national level. Experience of 15 EU Member States, TAIEX Publications, Bruxelles.

49.1998 - "Sistemi Politici Comparati”, in Enciclopedia Italiana delle Scienze Sociali, vol. VIII, Rome, Istituto dell’Enciclopedia Italiana, pp. 56–63.

48.1998 – "The Other Side of the Fascist Legacy”, in S. Larsen (ed.), Modern Europe After Fascism, New York, Columbia University Press, pp. 662–96.

47.1998 – "The Fascist Legacy in Italy: an Overview”, with Simona Colarizi, in S. Larsen (ed.), Modern Europe After Fascism, cit., pp. 457–75.

46.1998 – "Old and New Authoritarianism in Southern Europe”, with Franco Mattei, in S. Larsen (ed.), Modern Europe After Fascism, cit., 1752-74.

45.1997 - "Regimi Politici”, in Enciclopedia Italiana delle Scienze Sociali, vol. VII, Rome, Istituto dell’Enciclopedia Italiana, pp. 294–308.

44.1997 – "Freezing, Adaptation, and Change in Italian Democracy”, in Metin Heper, Ali Kazancigil, and Bert A. Rockman eds., Institutions and Democratic Statecraft, Boulder (Col., USA), Westview Press, pp. 171–90.

43.1997 – "Riforma elettorale e sistema partitico in Italia” in Gianfranco Bettin (ed.), Politica e Società. Studi in onore di Luciano Cavalli, Padova, Cedam, pp. 299–320.

42.1997 – "Party Elites and Democratic Consolidation in Southern Europe”, in Eva Etzioni-Halevy (ed.), Classes & Elites in Democracy and Democratization. A Collection of Readings, New York and London, Garland Publishing Inc., pp. 205–13.

41.1996 – "Partiti, gruppi e consolidamento democratico in Italia”, in VV. AA., Studi in Onore di Alberto Predieri, Milano, Giuffré, pp. 1169–207.

40.1996 – "Politikwissenschaft in Italien - Tradition und Empirismus”, in Hans J. Lietzmann and Wilhelm Bleek eds., Politikwissenschaft. Geschichte und Entwicklung in Deutschland und Europa, Munchen and Wien, Verlag, pp. 270–92.

39.1995 – "Parties, Groups and Democratic Consolidation in Italy”, in H. E. Chehabi and A. Stepan eds., Politics, Society, and Democracy. Comparative Studies, Essays in Honor of Juan J.Linz, Boulder (Col.), Westview Press, pp. 257–78.

38.1995 – "Democratic Consolidation: Definition and Models”, in Geoffrey Pridham (ed.), Transitions to Democracy, Aldershot, Dartmouth Publishing Co., pp. 571–90.

37.1995 – "Legitimacy and Democracy in Southern Europe”, with José Ramon Montero, in R. Gunther, N. Diamandouros, H.J. Puhle eds., The Politics of Democratic Consolidation in Southern Europe, Baltimore, The Johns Hopkins University Press, pp. 231–60.

36.1995 – "Parties and Democratic Consolidation in Southern Europe”, in R. Gunther, N. Diamandouros, H.J. Puhle eds., The Politics of Democratic Consolidation in Southern Europe, Baltimore, The Johns Hopkins University Press, pp. 315–88.

35.1994 – "Italy: Tracing the Roots of the Great Transformation”, with Luciano Bardi, in R. Katz and P. Mair, eds., How Party Organize. Change and Adaptation in Party Organizations in Western Democracies, London, Sage Publications, pp. 242–77.

34.1994 - ”Discipline Politologiche” in G. Martinotti and A. Quadrio Curzio eds., Guida alla Laurea in Scienze Politiche, Bologna, Il Mulino, pp. 112–42.

33.1993 – "Dissenso”, in Enciclopedia Italiana delle Scienze Sociali, vol. III, Roma, Istituto dell’Enciclopedia Italiana, pp. 189–94.

32.1992 – "Partiti e consolidamento democratico nel Sud Europa”, in M. Calise (ed.), Come cambiano i partiti, Bologna, Il Mulino.

31.1992 – "Partidos politicos y consolidacion democratica en el Sur de Europa”, in J. Benedicto and F. Reinares, eds., Las transformaciones de lo politico, Madrid, Alianza Editorial.

30.1992 – "Italy”, with Luciano Bardi, in R. Katz and P. Mair, eds., Party Organizations. A Data Handbook on Party Organizations in Western Democracies, London, Sage Publications.

29.1992 – "Decadenza”, in Enciclopedia Italiana delle Scienze Sociali, vol.II, Roma, Istituto dell’Enciclopedia Italiana, pp. 699–706.

28.1991 – "Problemi e scelte nella comparazione. Introduzione”, in G. Sartori and L. Morlino eds., La comparazione nelle scienze sociali, Bologna, Il Mulino.

27.1991 – "Introduzione”, in L. Morlino (ed.), Costruire la democrazia, Bologna, Il Mulino, pp. 9–39.

26.1991 – "La Confagricoltura tra attesa e compromesso”, in L. Morlino (ed.), Costruire la democrazia, Bologna, Il Mulino, pp. 127–206.

25.1991 – "La relazione tra gruppi e partiti. Conclusioni”, in L. Morlino (ed.), Costruire la democrazia, Bologna, Il Mulino, pp. 447–489.

24.1991 – "Introduzione”, in L.Morlino and A. Spreafico eds., Democrazia e partiti in America Latina, Milano, Angeli.

23.1990 – "Authoritarianisms”, in Bebler A. and Seroca J. eds., Contemporary Political Systems. Classifications and Typologies, Boulder (Col.) and London, Lynne Rienner Publishers, pp. 91–119.

22.1989 – "Ancora un bilancio lamentevole?”, in L. Morlino (ed.), Scienza Politica, Turin, Edizioni della Fondazione Agnelli, pp. 5–52.

21.1989 – "Teoria e macropolitica”, in L. Morlino (ed.), Scienza politica, Turin, Edizioni della Fondazione Agnelli, pp. 53–87.

20.1989 – "Epitaffio per un approccio di successo: il sistema politico”, in A. Panebianco (ed.), L’analisi della politica, Bologna, Il Mulino, pp. 71–87.

19.1988 – "Tra rappresentanza e uguaglianza”, in J. Jacobelli (ed.), Un’altra repubblica? Come, perchè, quando, Bari, Laterza, pp. 119–27.

18.1988 – "Consolidación democratica”, in J. Pinto (ed.), Ensayos sobre la crisis politica argentina, Buenos Aires, Centro Editor de America Latina, pp. 311–377.

17.1987 – "Las instauraciones democraticas en Europa Mediterranea. Algunas hipotesis comparativas”, in VV.AA., Lecciones para democratas en transición, Buenos Aires, Editorial de Belgrano, pp. 221–56.

16.1987 – "Crisis autoritaria y cambio de regimen en el Sur Europa”, in C. Huneeus (ed.), Para vivir la democracia, Santiago, Editorial Andante, pp. 13–49.

15.1987 – "Democratic Establishments. A Dimensional Analysis”, in E. Baloyra (ed.), Comparing New Democracies, Boulder (Col.), Westview, pp. 53–78.

14.1986 – "Dall’autoritarismo alla democrazia: Spagna, Portogallo e Grecia” in N. Tranfaglia e M. Firpo eds., La storia, vol.IX, Torino, UTET, pp. 761–88.

13.1986 – "Democrazie”, in Manuale di Scienza della politica, Bologna, Il Mulino, pp. 83–136.

12.1986 – "Autoritarismi”, in Manuale di scienza della politica, Bologna, Il Mulino, pp. 137–89.

11.1986 – "Sistema politico”, in Scarpelli U. (ed.), Gli strumenti del sapere contemporaneo, Torino, UTET, pp. 767–71 (rev. ed. 1997).

10.1984 – "The Changing Relationships Between Parties and Society in Italy”, in S. Bartolini and P. Mair eds., Party Politics in Contemporary Western Europe, London, Frank Cass & Co..

9.1983 – "Stabilità politica”, in N. Bobbio, N. Matteucci, G. Pasquino eds., Dizionario di politica, Torino, UTET, 2nd rev. ed..

8.1983 – "Dissenso”, in Bobbio, Matteucci, Pasquino eds., Dizionario di politica, Torino, UTET, 2nd rev. ed..

7.1983 – "Franchismo”, in Bobbio, Matteucci, Pasquino eds., Dizionario di politica, Torino, UTET, 2nd rev. ed..

6.1982 – "Del Fascismo a una democracia debil. El cambio de regimen en Italia (1939-48)”, in J. Santamaria (ed.), Transició a la democracia en el Sur Europa y America Latina, Madrid, CIS, pp. 93–150.

5.1978 – "Dal pluralismo limitato al pluralismo competitivo. Partiti e sindacati”, in G. De Vergottini (ed.), Una costituzione democratica per la Spagna, Milano, Angeli, pp. 89–120.

4.1978 – "Intervento”, in VV.AA., La costituzione spagnola nel trentennale della costituzione italiana, Bologna, Forni Editore.

3.1977 – "Il crollo dei regimi democratici. Prefazione”, in A. Valenzuela, Il crollo della democrazia in Cile, Torino, Editrice BdL. pp. 5–15.

2.1976 – "Dissenso”, in Bobbio N. and N. Matteucci eds., Dizionario di politica, Torino, UTET.

1.1976 – "Stabilità politica”, in Bobbio N. and Matteucci N. eds., Dizionario di politica, Torino, UTET.
