= International Political Science Association =

International scholarly organization

- Abbreviation: IPSA
- Formation: 1949
- Type: INGO
- Headquarters: Montreal, Canada
- Region served: Worldwide
- Official language: English, French
- President: Pablo Oñate (Spain)
- Parent organization: International Science Council (ISC)
- Website: www.ipsa.org

The International Political Science Association (IPSA) is an international scholarly association, founded under the auspices of UNESCO in 1949. IPSA is devoted to the advancement of political science in all parts of the world. During its history it has helped build bridges between East and West, North and South, and has promoted collaboration between scholars in both established and emerging democracies. Its aim is to create a global political science community in which all can participate, most recently it has been extending its reach in Eastern Europe and Latin America. IPSA has consultative status with the Economic and Social Council of the United Nations (ECOSOC) and it is a member of the International Science Council, which brings together over 230 science organizations across the world and actively cooperates with partners from the United Nations system, such as the United Nations Environment Programme (UNEP), the World Health Organization (WHO), and the United Nations Development Programme (UNDP).

== History ==
Since its beginning, national political science associations have constituted its core. Its founder members included American, Canadian, French and Indian political science associations. By 1960, 24 more national associations had joined up. Since then, collective membership has been expanding at a steady pace. Today, 59 national associations are collective members of IPSA. Each collective member is represented on IPSA's central governing organ, the council. The council lays down broad policy guidelines for the association and elects the executive committee, which is responsible for the conduct of IPSA's affairs between congresses.

Individual and associate membership was introduced in the early 1950s. Starting with 52 members in 1952, IPSA's individual membership now stands at more than 4,428 members. The association has worked hard to increase the involvement of women, who now make up more than a third of the membership. Associate membership is open to institutions engaged in research or teaching in the area of political science and is hovering at around 110 institutions worldwide.

== Mission ==
The special mandate of IPSA, expressed in its Constitution, is to support the development of political science in all parts of the world, building academic networks linking East and West, North and South. Its aim is to create an inclusive and global political science community in which all can participate. It seeks to promote collaboration between scholars in emerging and established democracies and to support the academic freedoms needed for the social sciences to flourish.

The activities and policies of IPSA reflect its global mission. It has been highly successful in the encouragement of national political science associations and today there are 59 such associations affiliated with IPSA. IPSA has maintained its links with the United Nations and has supported the development of other international and regional political science organizations.

IPSA World Congresses of Political Science are now held every second year, moving between continents. The participation of scholars from less developed countries is supported through travel grants and the Global South Solidarity Fund. IPSA's research committees offer opportunities for political scientists working in particular sub-fields of the discipline to associate with colleagues from around the world. Organizing events between World Congresses and playing a major role in these Congresses, the research committees encourage the worldwide pooling of skills and resources by working both together and in conjunction with specialist sub-groups of national associations.

IPSA publications, including the lead journal International Political Science Review, the International Political Science Abstracts, World Political Science, Participation, and the IPSA Portal, also seek to meet the needs of political scientists in different parts of the world. As part of IPSA's global mission to support and promote political science, it now conducts summer schools in research methods across the globe, for example, in South America and South Africa.

IPSA strives to ensure balanced representation in terms of region, gender and stage of career in all its activities – for example, the creation of a new research committee must be supported by political scientists from at least seven countries and two continents. Conference panels and roundtables are expected to display similar diversity, with representation from more than one continent and at least four countries.

By linking scholars from North and South as well as East and West, IPSA seeks to strengthen the networks that underpin a global political science community. Such linkages put political science in a stronger position to contribute to the quality of public deliberation and decision-making as well as to the understanding of an increasingly interconnected political world. Ultimately, IPSA supports the role of political science in empowering men and women to participate more effectively in political life, whether within or beyond the states in which they live.

== Academic activities ==
IPSA's academic activities fall under three main headings: 1) organizing biennial world congresses as well as regular events between congresses; 2) promoting research in political science, notably through a wide-reaching network of research committees (RCs); and 3) disseminating research and information through a range of publications. IPSA's principal academic activity is the biennial congress. Starting in 1950 and 1952, world congresses have since been taking place every three years. From small beginnings, they have developed into major international scientific occasions, typically attracting about 2000 participants. As of 2012, world congresses are held every other year. In addition to these major events, IPSA sponsors other types of scholarly meetings such as conferences, roundtables and workshops.

Since the 1970s, one of the most dynamic areas of growth within IPSA has been the activity of its RCs. In addition to organizing panels at the triennial congresses, RCs organize their own meetings between congresses, publish newsletters and issue other publications. IPSA now has 49 active RCs with interests ranging from political finance to gender and language politics and comparative democratization.

== List of Research Committees ==
- RC01 - Concepts and Methods
- RC02 - Political Elites
- RC03 - European Unification
- RC04 - Visual Politics
- RC05 - Comparative Studies on Local Government and Politics
- RC06 - Political Sociology
- RC07 - Women and Politics in the Global South
- RC08 - Legislative Specialists
- RC09 - Comparative Judicial Studies
- RC10 - Electronic Democracy
- RC11 - Science and Politics
- RC12 - Biology and Politics
- RC13 - Democratization in Comparative Perspective
- RC14 - Politics and Ethnicity
- RC15 - Political and Cultural Geography
- RC16 - Socio-Political Pluralism
- RC17 - Comparative Public Opinion
- RC18 - Asian and Pacific Studies
- RC19 - Gender Politics and Policy
- RC20 - Political Finance and Political Corruption
- RC21 - Political Socialization and Education
- RC22 - Political Communication
- RC23 - Elections, Citizens and Parties
- RC24 - Armed Forces and Society
- RC25 - Comparative Health Policy
- RC26 - Human Rights
- RC27 - Structure and Organization of Government
- RC28 - Comparative Federalism and Multilevel Governance
- RC29 - Psycho-Politics
- RC30 - Comparative Public Policy
- RC31 - Political Philosophy
- RC32 - Public Policy and Administration
- RC33 - The Study of Political Science as a Discipline
- RC34 - Quality of Democracy
- RC35 - Technology and Development
- RC36 - Political Power
- RC37 - Rethinking Political Development
- RC38 - Politics and Business
- RC39 - Welfare States and Developing Societies
- RC40 - New World Orders?
- RC41 - Geopolitics
- RC42 - Security, Integration and Unification
- RC43 - Religion and Politics
- RC44 - Security, Conflict and Democratization
- RC45 - Quantitative International Politics
- RC47 - Local-Global Relations
- RC48 - Administrative Culture
- RC49 - Socialism, Capitalism and Democracy
- RC50 - The Politics of Language
- RC51 - International Political Economy
- RC52 - Climate Security and Planetary Politics
- RC53 - Indigenous Politics

== Summer schools ==
IPSA offers summer schools in São Paulo, Brazil (since 2010), Stellenbosch, South Africa (2011–2013), Singapore (since 2012), Ankara/Antalya, Turkey (since 2013), Mexico (since 2016), Saint Petersburg (since 2017), Naples (since 2018) and Montreal (since 2020). IPSA summer schools are intended to give social sciences scholars access to high-quality advanced training in qualitative and quantitative social science and political science research methods.

== Publishing ==
IPSA's extensive publishing program has included International Political Science Abstracts (IPSA) (1951–present); International Political Science Review (1980–present) and the bulletin of the association, Participation.(1977–). More recently, IPSA has offered an online publication, IPSAPortal, which provides ratings and links for the top 300 web sites for political science worldwide. Finally, IPSA offers a monthly information email called Newsletter. From 2014 to 2019, IPSA also published World Political Science, in collaboration with De Gruyter.

== Awards ==
The association awards various scholarly awards to leading scholars in the field, including the Karl Deutsch Award.

- Karl Deutsch Award
- Prize of the Foundation Mattei Dogan awarded by the International Political Science Association for High Achievement in Political Science
- Stein Rokkan Award
- Francesco Kjellberg Award for Outstanding Papers Presented by New Scholars
- Wilma Rule Award: IPSA Award for the Best Paper on Gender and Politics
- Global South Award
- Meisel-Laponce Award
- APSA-IPSA Theodore J. Lowi First Book Award
- RC01 Award for Concept Analysis in Political Science
- RC01 Best C&M Working Paper Award
- RC27 Charles H. Levine Memorial Book Prize
- RC27 Ulrich Kloeti Award

== List of World Congresses and Presidents ==
World Congresses and Presidents
| Nr. | IPSA | Location | | President | | From |
|---|---|---|---|---|---|---|
| 28. | IPSA 2025 | Seoul | South Korea | 2023–2025 | Pablo Oñate | University of Valencia Spain |
| 27. | IPSA 2023 | Buenos Aires | Argentina | 2021–2023 | Dianne Pinderhughes | University of Notre Dame United States |
| 26. | IPSA 2021 | Lisbon (virtual) | Portugal | 2018–2021 | Marianne Kneuer | University of Hildesheim Germany |
| 25. | IPSA 2018 | Brisbane | Australia | 2016–2018 | İlter Turan | Istanbul Bilgi University Turkey |
| 24. | IPSA 2016 | Poznań | Poland | 2014–2016 | Aiji Tanaka | Waseda University Japan |
| 23. | IPSA 2014 | Montreal | Canada | 2012–2014 | Helen Milner | Princeton University United States |
| 22. | IPSA 2012 | Madrid | Spain | 2009–2012 | Leonardo Morlino | University of Florence Italy |
| 21. | IPSA 2009 | Santiago | Chile | 2006–2009 | Lourdes Sola | University of São Paulo Brazil |
| 20. | IPSA 2006 | Fukuoka | Japan | 2003–2006 | Max Kaase | International University of Bremen Germany |
| 19. | IPSA 2003 | Durban | South Africa | 2000–2003 | Dalchoong Kim | Yonsei University KOR |
| 18. | IPSA 2000 | Quebec | Canada | 1997–2000 | Theodore J. Lowi | Cornell University United States |
| 17. | IPSA 1997 | Seoul | South Korea | 1994–1997 | Jean Leca | Sciences Po (FNSP), Paris France |
| 16. | IPSA 1994 | Berlin | Germany | 1991–1994 | Carole Pateman | UCLA, Los Angeles United States |
| 15. | IPSA 1991 | Buenos Aires | Argentina | 1988–1991 | Guillermo O'Donnell | CEBRAP, São Paulo/Notre Dame Brazil |
| 14. | IPSA 1988 | Washington, D.C. | United States | 1985–1988 | Kinhide Mushakoji | UN University, Tokyo Japan |
| 13. | IPSA 1985 | Paris | France | 1982–1985 | Klaus von Beyme | University of Heidelberg Germany |
| 12. | IPSA 1982 | Rio de Janeiro | Brazil | 1979–1982 | Candido Mendes | SBI, Rio de Janeiro Brazil |
| 11. | IPSA 1979 | Moscow | Soviet Union | 1976–1979 | Karl Deutsch | Harvard University United States |
| 10. | IPSA 1976 | Edinburgh | Scotland | 1973–1976 | Jean Laponce | University of British Columbia Canada |
| 9. | IPSA 1973 | Montreal | Canada | 1970–1973 | Stein Rokkan | University of Bergen Norway |
| 8. | IPSA 1970 | Munich | Germany | 1967–1970 | Carl Joachim Friedrich | Harvard University United States |
| 7. | IPSA 1967 | Brussels | Belgium | 1964–1967 | Jacques Freymond | IUHEI, Geneva Switzerland |
| 6. | IPSA 1964 | Geneva | Switzerland | 1961–1964 | Norman Chester | Nuffield College, Oxford United Kingdom |
| 5. | IPSA 1961 | Paris | France | 1958–1961 | Jacques Chapsal | FNSP, Paris France |
| 4. | IPSA 1958 | Rome | Italy | 1955–1958 | James K. Pollock | University of Michigan United States |
| 3. | IPSA 1955 | Stockholm | Sweden | 1952–1955 | William A. Robson | London School of Economics United Kingdom |
| 2. | IPSA 1952 | The Hague | Netherlands | 1949–1952 | Quincy Wright | University of Chicago United States |
| 1. | IPSA 1950 | Zurich | Switzerland | 1949–1952 | Quincy Wright | University of Chicago United States |
| X | Foundation | Paris | FRA | 1949–1952 | Quincy Wright | University of Chicago United States |

== IPSA Executive Director (Secretaries General from 1949 to 2019) ==
- François Goguel, FNSP, Paris (1949–1950)
- Jean Meynaud, FNSP, Paris (1950–1955)
- John Goormaghtigh, Brussels (1955–1960)
- Serge Hurtig, FNSP, Paris (1960–1967)
- André Philippart, Carnegie Endowment, Brussels (1967–1976)
- John Trent, University of Ottawa (1976–1988)
- Francesco Kjellberg, University of Oslo (1988–1994)
- John Coakley, University College Dublin (1994–2000)
- Guy Lachapelle, Concordia University (2000–2019)
- Kim Fontaine-Skronski, Concordia University (2019–)
