= Przeworski =

Przeworski is a surname. Notable people with the surname include:

- Adam Przeworski (born 1940), Polish-American political scientist;
- Andrzej Przeworski (1900–1952), Polish footballer, referee and manager;
- Molly Przeworski, American population geneticist.

== See also ==
- Przeworsk County
- Przeworski (cheese)
