= Authoritarianism =

Political system

Authoritarianism is a political system characterized by the rejection of political plurality, the use of strong central power to preserve the political status quo, and reductions in democracy, separation of powers, civil liberties, and the rule of law. Authoritarian regimes may be either autocratic or oligarchic and may be based upon the rule of a party, the military, or the concentration of power in a single person. States that have a blurred boundary between democracy and authoritarianism have sometimes been characterized as "hybrid democracies", "hybrid regimes" or "competitive authoritarian" states.

The political scientist Juan Linz, in an influential 1964 work, An Authoritarian Regime: Spain, defined authoritarianism as possessing four qualities:

1. Limited political pluralism, which is achieved with constraints on the legislature, political parties and interest groups.
2. Political legitimacy based on appeals to emotion and identification of the regime as a necessary evil to combat "easily recognizable societal problems, such as underdevelopment or insurgency."
3. Minimal political mobilization, and suppression of anti-regime activities.
4. Ill-defined executive powers, often vague and shifting, used to extend the power of the executive.

Minimally defined, an authoritarian government lacks free and competitive direct elections to legislatures, free and competitive direct or indirect elections for executives, or both. Broadly defined, authoritarian states include countries that lack human rights such as freedom of religion, or countries in which the government and the opposition do not alternate in power at least once following free elections. Authoritarian states might contain nominally democratic institutions such as political parties, legislatures and elections which are managed to entrench authoritarian rule and can feature fraudulent, non-competitive elections.

Since 1946, the share of authoritarian states in the international political system increased until the mid-1970s but declined from then until 2000. Prior to 2000, dictatorships typically began with a coup and replaced a pre-existing authoritarian regime. Since 2000, dictatorships are most likely to begin through democratic backsliding whereby a democratically elected leader established an authoritarian regime.

== Characteristics ==
Authoritarianism is characterized by highly concentrated and centralized government power maintained by political repression and the exclusion of potential or supposed challengers by armed force. It uses political parties and mass organizations to mobilize people around the goals of the regime. Adam Przeworski has theorized that "authoritarian equilibrium rests mainly on lies, fear and economic prosperity."

Authoritarianism also tends to embrace the informal and unregulated exercise of political power, a leadership that is "self-appointed and even if elected cannot be displaced by citizens' free choice among competitors", the arbitrary deprivation of civil liberties and little tolerance for meaningful opposition. A range of social controls also attempt to stifle civil society while political stability is maintained by control over and support of the armed forces, a bureaucracy staffed by the regime and creation of allegiance through various means of socialization and indoctrination. Pippa Norris and Ronald Inglehart identify authoritarianism in politicians and political parties by looking for values of security, conformity, and obedience.

Authoritarianism is marked by "indefinite political tenure" of the ruler or ruling party (often in a one-party state) or other authority. The transition from an authoritarian system to a more democratic form of government is referred to as democratization.

=== Constitution ===
Constitutions in authoritarian states may serve a variety of roles, including "operating manual" (describing how the government is to function); "billboard" (signal of regime's intent), "blueprint" (outline of future regime plans), and "window dressing" (material designed to obfuscate, such as provisions setting forth freedoms that are not honored in practice). Authoritarian constitutions may help legitimize, strengthen, and consolidate regimes. An authoritarian constitution "that successfully coordinates government action and defines popular expectations can also help consolidate the regime's grip on power by inhibiting re coordination on a different set of arrangements." Unlike democratic constitutions, authoritarian constitutions do not set direct limits on executive authority; however, in some cases such documents may function as ways for elites to protect their own property rights or constrain autocrats' behavior.

The Soviet Russia Constitution of 1918, the first charter of the new Russian Socialist Federated Soviet Republic (RSFSR), was described by Vladimir Lenin as a "revolutionary" document. It was, he said, unlike any constitution drafted by a nation-state. The concept of "authoritarian constitutionalism" has been developed by legal scholar Mark Tushnet. Tushnet distinguishes authoritarian constitutionalist regimes from "liberal constitutionalist" regimes ("the sort familiar in the modern West, with core commitments to human rights and self-governance implemented by means of varying institutional devices") and from purely authoritarian regimes (which reject the idea of human rights or constraints on leaders' power). He describes authoritarian constitutionalist regimes as (1) authoritarian dominant-party states that (2) impose sanctions (such as libel judgments) against, but do not arbitrarily arrest, political dissidents; (3) permit "reasonably open discussion and criticism of its policies"; (4) hold "reasonably free and fair elections", without systemic intimidation, but "with close attention to such matters as the drawing of election districts and the creation of party lists to ensure as best it can that it will prevail – and by a substantial margin"; (5) reflect at least occasional responsiveness to public opinion; and (6) create "mechanisms to ensure that the amount of dissent does not exceed the level it regards as desirable." Tushnet cites Singapore as an example of an authoritarian constitutionalist state, and connects the concept to that of hybrid regimes.

=== Current list of countries ===
The following is a non-exhaustive list of examples of states characterized as authoritarian, as seen in the sources in the Notes and references column. Most countries listed are also not rated as democracies by The Economist Democracy Index or as 'free' by Freedom House's Freedom in the World index, or do not have a higher score on the V-Dem Democracy Indices.

State	Time period	Ruling group or person	Notes and references
Afghanistan	1996–2001; 2021–	Taliban	Totalitarian theocratic state
Angola	1975–	MPLA	Authoritarian party system
Azerbaijan	1993–	Aliyev family and New Azerbaijan Party	Hereditary dictatorship
Bahrain	1783–	House of Khalifa	Absolute monarchy
Belarus	1994–	Alexander Lukashenko	
Brunei	1962–	House of Bolkiah	Absolute monarchy under a state of emergency
Burkina Faso	2022–	Ibrahim Traoré	Military junta
Burundi	2005–	CNDD–FDD	Ethnic-based authoritarian rule
Cambodia	1979–	Cambodian People's Party	
Cameroon	1960–	Ahmadou Ahidjo (1960–1982); Paul Biya (1982–)	
Chad	1990–	Idriss Déby (1990–2021); Mahamat Déby (2021–)	
China	1949–	Chinese Communist Party	China received 9 out of 100 points in Freedom House's 2024 Global Freedom Score. The party promotes itself as 'consultative' on local issues and some scholars describe the Chinese system as "a fragmented authoritarianism" (Lieberthal), "a negotiated state", or "a consultative authoritarian regime."
Republic of the Congo	1969–1992; 1997–	Congolese Party of Labour, later under Denis Sassou Nguesso (1979–1992; 1997–)	Dominant party system
Cuba	1959–	Communist Party of Cuba	See also Castrism.
Djibouti	1977–	People's Rally for Progress	
Egypt	1952–	Egyptian Armed Forces	De facto military-backed regime.
El Salvador	2019–	Nayib Bukele	
Equatorial Guinea	1968–	Nguema family	Authoritarian regime initially led by the first president Francisco Macías Nguema until 1979, when he was overthrown by his nephew Teodoro Obiang Nguema Mbasogo in a military coup.
Eritrea	1993– (Note: Eritrea gained de facto independence in 1991; de jure independence was achieved in 1993.)	People's Front for Democracy and Justice under Isaias Afwerki	Totalitarian state
Eswatini	1968–	House of Dlamini	Absolute monarchy
Ethiopia	2019–	Prosperity Party under Abiy Ahmed	Considered "authoritarian" by some activists and dissents. Abiy Ahmed is considered by some to be a "charming dictator".
Gabon	1967–	Bongo family	Ali Bongo was overthrown by his cousin Brice Oligui Nguema in 2023.
Guinea	1958–	Ahmed Sékou Touré (1958–1984); Lansana Conté (1984–2008); Moussa Dadis Camara (2008–2010); Alpha Condé (2010–2021); Mamady Doumbouya (2021–)	Guinea was marked by a series of authoritarian rulers who denounced previous regimes on democratic issues. The government under Mamady Doumbouya unilaterally dissolved 40 political parties in 2026, including three of the main opposition parties.
Hong Kong (Special administrative region of China)	2020–	Pro-Beijing camp	Since the enactment of the Hong Kong National Security Law, the Hong Kong government began cracking down on pro-democracy activists, politicians, and news outlets, which is considered by many to be a sign of rising authoritarianism in Hong Kong.
Iran	1979–	Ruhollah Khomeini (1979–1989); Ali Khamenei (1989–2026); Mojtaba Khamenei (2026–)	After the Iranian Revolution, Iran became a totalitarian clerical state (nominally an "Islamic republic") based on the absolute authority of the unelected Supreme Leader of Iran, based on the strict Shia concept of Guardianship of the Islamic Jurist. If it has the opportunity, this legal body will remove reformist politicians. In 2000, Juan José Linz wrote that "it is difficult to fit the Iranian regime into the existing typology, as it combines the ideological bent of totalitarianism with the limited pluralism of authoritarianism and holds regular elections in which candidates advocating differing policies and incumbents are often defeated."
Israel	1996–1999; 2009–2021; 2022–	Benjamin Netanyahu	Though officially a democratic state, its treatment of Palestinians and the policies of the thirty-seventh government of Israel have been seen as authoritarian.
Jordan	1946–	Hashemites	Semi-constitutional monarchy
Laos	1975–	Lao People's Revolutionary Party	One party system
Mali	2020–	Assimi Goïta	Military junta
Morocco	1961–	Alawi dynasty under Hassan II (1961–1999) and Mohammed VI (1999–)	Under Hassan II, several pro-Makhzen parties were created with the intention of fragmenting the political landscape, and existing opposition parties were co-opted. A new constitution was adopted following a 2011 referendum which transferred some powers to the prime minister but retained the king's executive authority. See also Years of Lead (Morocco).
Mozambique	1975–	FRELIMO	De-facto dominant party.
Myanmar	2021–	Min Aun Hlaing	See also 2021 Myanmar coup d'état .
Nicaragua	1979–1990; 2007–	Daniel Ortega, later with Rosario Murillo (2017–)	
Niger	2023-	Abdourahamane Tiani	Military junta
North Korea	1949–	Workers' Party of Korea under Kim dynasty	Hereditary dictatorship. Some scholars consider North Korea to be the most totalitarian country.
Oman	1856–	Al Bu Said dynasty	Absolute monarchy
Palestine	1964–	Palestine Liberation Organization and Hamas	
Qatar	1971–	House of Thani	Absolute monarchy
Russia	1999–	Vladimir Putin	Has continuously ruled since 1999 as both president and prime minister.
Rwanda	2000–	Paul Kagame	Authoritarian ruler supported by own ethnic group
Saudi Arabia	1934–	House of Saud	Absolute monarchy
South Sudan	2011–	Sudan People's Liberation Movement under Salva Kiir	
Sudan	2019; 2021–	Abdel Fattah al-Burhan	Military junta
Tajikistan	1994–	Emomali Rahmon	
Togo	1967–	Gnassingbé Eyadéma (1967–2005); Faure Gnassingbé (2005–)	Hereditary dictatorship
Tunisia	2021–	Kais Saied	Saied was democratically elected in the 2019 Tunisian presidential election and performed a self-coup in 2021 by dismissing the national parliament and government. A constitutional referendum in 2022 instated a presidential system.
Turkey	2003–	Justice and Development Party under Recep Tayyip Erdoğan	Described by observers as a "competitive authoritarian regime". The 2017 Turkish constitutional referendum replaced the parliamentary system in place since the founding of the republic in 1923 with an executive presidential system.
Turkmenistan	2006–	Democratic Party of Turkmenistan under Gurbanguly Berdimuhamedow	Effectively a totalitarian hereditary dictatorship, organized since 2022 under a duumvirate with Gurbanguly serving as chairman of the People's Council and his son Serdar serving as president.
United Arab Emirates	1971–	Royal families of the United Arab Emirates	Effective diarchic monarchies
United States	2017–2021; 2025–	Donald Trump	See also Trumpism and authoritarianism during the Trump presidencies.
Uganda	1986–	Yoweri Museveni	Autocratic ruler
Uzbekistan	1989–	Uzbekistan Liberal Democratic Party	
Venezuela	1999–	United Socialist Party of Venezuela	See also Chavismo.
Vietnam	1976–	Vietnamese Communist Party	Sole party system
Zimbabwe	1980–	ZANU-PF	Authoritarian party system

=== Historical ===
The following is a non-exhaustive list of examples of states which were historically authoritarian.

State	Time period	Ruling group or person	Notes and references
(People's Socialist Republic of Albania) Albania	1946–1992	Party of Labour of Albania	One party rule under Enver Hoxha and Ramiz Alia.
Algeria	1999–2019	Abdelaziz Bouteflika	
Argentina	1946–1955	Justicialist Party under Juan Perón	See also Peronism.
Argentina	1966–1973	Military government	See also the Argentine Revolution.
Argentina	1973–1976	Justicialist Party under Juan and Isabel Perón	
Argentina	1976–1983	National Reorganization Process	
Austria	1933–1938	Christian Social Party under Engelbert Dollfuß and Fatherland Front under Kurt Schuschnigg	See also the Federal State of Austria and Ständestaat.
Bangladesh	2009–2024	Awami League under Sheikh Hasina	
Brazil	1937–1945	Getúlio Vargas	See also the Vargas Era.
Brazil	1964–1985	Military junta	See also the 1964 Brazilian coup d'état.
(People's Republic of Bulgaria) Bulgaria	1878–1944	House of Saxe-Coburg and Gotha-Koháry	Authoritarian rule more prevalent after the 1935 counter-coup to the 1934 coup d'état
(People's Republic of Bulgaria) Bulgaria	1944–1990	Communist one-party state rule, particularly under Todor Zhivkov	
Burkina Faso	1987–2014	Blaise Compaoré	Ousted in the 2014 Burkina Faso uprising.
Burma (renamed Myanmar in 1989)	1962–2011	Military government and the Burma Socialist Programme Party	Started with the 1962 Burmese coup d'état and ended with the 2011–2012 Burmese political reforms.
Burundi	1961–1993	UPRONA	
Chad	1982–1990	Hissène Habré	Deposed by Idriss Déby in the 1990 Chadian coup d'état.
Chile	1973–1990	Government Junta under Augusto Pinochet	See also the 1973 Chilean coup d'état.
Republic of China	1927–1949	Kuomintang and Nationalist government under Chiang Kai-shek	The Republic of China on Taiwan is listed further below.
Confederate States of America	1861–1865	Jefferson Davis	Herrenvolk republic with a "democracy of the white race".
Democratic Kampuchea	1975–1979	Khmer Rouge rule of Cambodia under Pol Pot	Totalitarian one-party regime that instigated the Cambodian genocide.
Democratic Republic of the Congo	1997–2019	Laurent-Désiré Kabila and Joseph Kabila	Zaire is listed further below.
Croatia	1941–1945	Ustaše under Ante Pavelić	See also Independent State of Croatia
Croatia	1990–1999	Croatian Democratic Union under Franjo Tuđman	
Czechoslovakia	1938–1939	Party of National Unity	
(Derg) Ethiopia	1974–1991	Workers' Party of Ethiopia under Mengistu Haile Mariam	
(Derg) Ethiopia	1991–2019	Ethiopian People's Revolutionary Democratic Front	
Fiji	2006–2022	Frank Bainimarama	Bainimarama assumed power in the 2006 Fijian coup d'état; democratic elections were held for the first time since the coup in 2014, with Bainimarama continuing as leader of the FijiFirst party.
France	1793–1794	Committee of Public Safety (provisional government during the Reign of Terror under Maximilien Robespierre)	See also the French Revolution.
France	1799–1814	Napoleon	
The Gambia	1994–2017	Yahya Jammeh	Jammeh was defeated in the 2016 Gambian presidential election and ultimately removed from office by an ECOWAS military intervention after refusing to concede.
Nazi Germany	1933–1945	National Socialist German Workers' Party	See also Nazism.
(Greek junta) Greece	1936–1941	Fascist rule under Ioannis Metaxas	
(Greek junta) Greece	1967–1974	Military junta under Georgios Papadopoulos	
Guinea-Bissau	1980–1999	João Bernardo Vieira	Nino Vieira would govern in an authoritarian manner in the 80s and 90s until his overthrow, in 2005 he returned to the presidency until his assassination in 2009.
(Kingdom of Hungary) Hungary	1920–1944	Miklós Horthy and the Unity Party	
(Kingdom of Hungary) Hungary	2010–2026	Fidesz under Viktor Orbán	Dominant party system headed by populist-authoritarian leader. See also Orbanism.
Indonesia	1959–1998	Sukarno and Suharto	See also the Guided Democracy era and the New Order.
Iran	1925–1979	Pahlavi dynasty	
Iraq	1968–2003	Arab Socialist Ba'ath Party – Iraq Region under Ahmed Hassan al-Bakr (1968–1979) and Saddam Hussein (1979–2003)	
(Fascist Italy) Italy	1922–1943	National Fascist Party	
Empire of Japan	1931–1945	Hirohito and the Imperial Rule Assistance Association	
Liberia	1886–1980	True Whig Party	Continuous rule until the 1980 Liberian coup d'état.
Liberia	1980–1990	Samuel Doe	Executed during the First Liberian Civil War.
Kazakhstan	1990–2022	Amanat	Formerly named Nur Otan. The incumbent president Kassym-Jomart Tokayev renounced his party membership, establishing in the amendments of the second republic that no president should have affiliation with any party.
(Kingdom of Libya) Libya	1951–1969	Idris	According to author Jonathan Bearman, although the Kingdom of Libya was nominally a parliamentary democracy, it was in exercise a "monarchical dictatorship" in which executive power rested in the king and royal court.
(Kingdom of Libya) Libya	1969–2011	Muammar Gaddafi	
Lithuania	1926–1940	Antanas Smetona	Ended in the Soviet occupation.
Macedonia	2006–2016	Nikola Gruevski	
Mali	1968–1991	Moussa Traoré	Deposed in the 1991 Malian coup d'état and sentenced to death twice, exonerated in May 2002.
Massachusetts Bay Colony	1630–1691	John Winthrop	
Mexico	17 May–4 June 1833	Santa Anna	
Mexico	18 June–5 July 1833	Santa Anna	
Mexico	27 October–December 1833	Santa Anna	
Mexico	1834–1835	Santa Anna	
Mexico	20 March–10 July 1839	Santa Anna	
Mexico	1841–1842	Santa Anna	
Mexico	14 May–6 September 1843	Santa Anna	
Mexico	4 June–12 September 1844	Santa Anna	
Mexico	21 March–2 April 1847	Santa Anna	
Mexico	20 May–15 September 1847	Santa Anna	
Mexico	1853–1855	Santa Anna	
Mexico	1876–1911	Porfirio Díaz, Juan Méndez, and Manuel Flores.	See also Porfiriato.
Mexico	1929–2000	Institutional Revolutionary Party	Continuous rule until the 2000 Mexican presidential election. See also Tlatelolco massacre and the rigged 1988 Mexican presidential election.
Ottoman Empire	1878–1908	Abdul Hamid II	
Ottoman Empire	1913–1918	The Three Pashas	
Montenegro	1990–2023	Democratic Party of Socialists of Montenegro under Milo Đukanović	
Nicaragua	1936–1979	Somoza family	The Somoza clan loses power in the Sandinista revolution.
Paraguay	1954–1989	Alfredo Stroessner	Ended with 1989 Paraguayan coup d'état. Stroessner's Colorado party continues to dominate Paraguayan politics, however.
Philippines	1965–1986	Ferdinand Marcos	Marcos was democratically elected in 1965, but used martial law to expand his powers. Ended with the People Power Revolution.
Philippines	2016–2022	Rodrigo Duterte	
Poland	1926–1939	Sanation	See also the May Coup.
Portugal	1926–1933	Ditadura Nacional	
Portugal	1933–1974	Estado Novo	Ended with the Carnation Revolution.
(Kingdom of Romania) (Socialist Republic of Romania) Romania	1940–1944	Fascist rule by the Iron Guard and later groups	Christo-fascist Iron Guard rule in government from 1940–1941, with later fascist groups retaining power until late 1944.
(Kingdom of Romania) (Socialist Republic of Romania) Romania	1947–1989	Romanian Communist Party, especially under Nicolae Ceaușescu	
Russian State	1918–1920	White movement under Alexander Kolchak	
Rwanda	1961–1994	Grégoire Kayibanda and Juvénal Habyarimana	
Serbia	2012-2026	Serbian Progressive Party under Aleksandar Vučić	
(Slovak Republic (1939–1945)) Slovakia	1939–1945	Fascist rule by the Slovak People's Party under Jozef Tiso	Totalitarian religious rule and Nazi puppet.
Somalia	1969–1991	Siad Barre	
South Africa	1948–1994	National Party	Ended with the end of apartheid.
South Korea	1948–1960	Syngman Rhee	
South Korea	1961–1987	Park Chung-hee and Chun Doo-hwan	
South Korea	2022–2025	Yoon Suk Yeol	Until 2024 South Korean martial law crisis and the subsequent impeachment
Soviet Union	1922–1991	Communist Party of the Soviet Union	See also authoritarian socialism.
Francoist Spain	1936–1977	FET y de las JONS under Francisco Franco	Ended with the Spanish transition to democracy.
Sudan	1969–1985	Jaafar Nimeiry	
Sudan	1989–2019	Omar al-Bashir	Ousted in the 2019 Sudanese coup d'état.
Syria	1963–2024	Arab Socialist Ba'ath Party – Syria Region, later under the Assad family	Totalitarian police state under a hereditary dictatorship
Taiwan	1945–1987	Kuomintang under Chiang Kai-shek and Chiang Ching-kuo	The Republic of China (1927–1949) is listed further above.
Thailand	1948–1957	Plaek Phibunsongkhram	Ended with the 1957 Thai coup d'état.
Thailand	1958–1973	Sarit Thanarat and Thanom Kittikachorn	Ended with the 1973 Thai popular uprising.
Thailand	2014–2023	Prayut Chan-o-cha	
Thailand	2019–2024	Senate of Thailand	The 250-member Senate, appointed by the military junta, has considerable power, they have the right to approve the appointment of the Prime Minister and the House of Representatives has often been intervene by the Senate. In the 2023 election, even though the Move Forward Party with Pita Limjaroenrat as the leader will have the most votes. However, the Senate rejected Pita as Prime Minister.
Tunisia	1987–2011	Zine El Abidine Ben Ali	
Turkey	1923–1950	Republican People's Party under Mustafa Kemal Atatürk	
Turkmenistan	1991–2006	Democratic Party of Turkmenistan under Saparmurat Niyazov	Effectively a totalitarian dictatorship.
Ukraine	1992–2005	Leonid Kuchma	Ended in the Orange Revolution.
Ukraine	2010–2014	Party of Regions under Viktor Yanukovych	Ended in the Revolution of Dignity.
Ukrainian State	1918	Pavlo Skoropadskyi	Started with the 1918 Ukrainian coup d'état and ended with the Anti-Hetman Uprising.
Uganda	1971–1979	Idi Amin	
(Kingdom of Yugoslavia) (Socialist Federal Republic of Yugoslavia) Yugoslavia	1929–1934	Alexander I and the JRSD	See also the 6 January Dictatorship.
(Kingdom of Yugoslavia) (Socialist Federal Republic of Yugoslavia) Yugoslavia	1934–1941	Milan Stojadinović and the JRZ	
(Kingdom of Yugoslavia) (Socialist Federal Republic of Yugoslavia) Yugoslavia	1944–1990	League of Communists of Yugoslavia under Josip Broz Tito (–1980)	See also the death and state funeral of Josip Broz Tito.
Federal Republic of Yugoslavia	1992–2000	Socialist Party of Serbia under Slobodan Milošević	Ended after Milošević was overthrown.
Zaire	1965–1997	Mobutu Sese Seko	The Democratic Republic of the Congo after 1997 is listed above.

=== Socioeconomic factors ===
Scholars such as Seymour Lipset, Carles Boix, Susan Stokes, Dietrich Rueschemeyer, Evelyne Stephens and John Stephens argue that economic development increases the likelihood of democratization. Adam Przeworski and Fernando Limongi argue that while economic development makes democracies less likely to turn authoritarian, there is insufficient evidence to conclude that development causes democratization (turning an authoritarian state into a democracy).

Eva Bellin argues that under certain circumstances the bourgeoise and labor are more likely to favor democratization, but less so under other circumstances. Economic development can boost public support for authoritarian regimes in the short-to-medium term.

According to Michael Albertus, most land reform programs tend to be implemented by authoritarian regimes that subsequently withhold property rights from the beneficiaries of the land reform. Authoritarian regimes do so to gain coercive leverage over rural populations.

Unemployment and inflation tend to be associated with increased authoritarian attitutes.

The experience of male-biased human sex ratios was associated with higher support for authoritarianism.

=== Institutions ===
Authoritarian regimes typically incorporate similar political institutions to that of democratic regimes, such as legislatures and judiciaries, although they may serve different purposes. Democratic regimes are marked by institutions that are essential to economic development and individual freedom, including representative legislatures and competitive political parties. Most authoritarian regimes embrace these political structures, but use it in a way that reinforces their power. Authoritarian legislatures, for example, are forums through which leaders may enhance their bases of support, share power, and monitor elites. Additionally, authoritarian party systems are extremely unstable and unconducive to party development, largely due to monopolistic patterns of authority. Judiciaries may be present in authoritarian states where they serve to repress political challengers, institutionalize punishment, and undermine the rule of law.

Authoritarian regimes may allow multi-party elections. Since the end of the Cold War, there has been a significant rise in multi-party elections in authoritarian regimes. However, democratic and authoritarian differ prominently in their elections. Democratic elections are generally inclusive, competitive, and fair. In most instances, the elected leader is appointed to act on behalf of the general will. Authoritarian elections, on the other hand, are frequently subject to fraud and extreme constraints on the participation of opposing parties. Autocratic leaders employ tactics like murdering and/or imprisoning political opposition and paying election monitors to ensure victory. The proportion of authoritarian regimes with elections and support parties has risen in recent years. This is largely due to the increasing popularity of democracies and electoral autocracies, leading authoritarian regimes to imitate democratic regimes in hopes of receiving foreign aid and dodging criticism. Flawed elections also give authoritarians a controlled way to monitor public sentiment.

According to a 2018 study, most party-led dictatorships regularly hold popular elections. Prior to the 1990s, most of these elections had no alternative parties or candidates for voters to choose. Since the end of the Cold War, about two-thirds of elections in authoritarian systems allow for some opposition, but the elections are structured in a way to heavily favor the incumbent authoritarian regime. In 2020, almost half of all authoritarian systems had multi-party governments. Cabinet appointments by an authoritarian regime to outsiders can consolidate their rule by dividing the opposition and co-opting outsiders.

Hindrances to free and fair elections in authoritarian systems may include:

- Control of the media by the authoritarian incumbents.
- Interference with opposition campaigning.
- Electoral fraud.
- Violence against opposition.
- Large-scale spending by the state in favor of the incumbents.
- Permitting of some parties, but not others.
- Prohibitions on opposition parties, but not independent candidates.
- Allowing competition between candidates within the incumbent party, but not those who are not in the incumbent party.

=== Interactions with other elites and the masses ===
The foundations of stable authoritarian rule are that the authoritarian prevents contestation from the masses and other elites. The authoritarian regime may use co-optation or repression (or carrots and sticks) to prevent revolts. Authoritarian rule entails a balancing act whereby the ruler has to maintain the support of other elites (frequently through the distribution of state and societal resources) and the support of the public (through distribution of the same resources): the authoritarian rule is at risk if the balancing act is lopsided, as it risks a coup by the elites or an uprising by the mass public.

Public opinion research indicates that many authoritarian regimes enjoy substantial public support. There may be varied explanations for this, including preference falsification, manipulation of information by authoritarian regimes, propaganda, and censorship and repression of dissenting perspectives. Authoritarian regimes tend to care about public opinion, as public grievances against the regime can risk rebellion or coups. Authoritarian regimes may resort to redistribution to boost public support for the regime.

According to a 2019 study by Sergei Guriev and Daniel Treisman, authoritarian regimes have over time become less reliant on violence and mass repression to maintain control. The study shows instead that authoritarians have increasingly resorted to manipulation of information as a means of control. Authoritarians increasingly seek to create an appearance of good performance, conceal state repression, and imitate democracy. While authoritarian regimes invest considerably in propaganda out of a belief that it enhances regime survival, scholars have offered mixed views as to whether propaganda is effective.

=== Systemic weakness and resilience ===
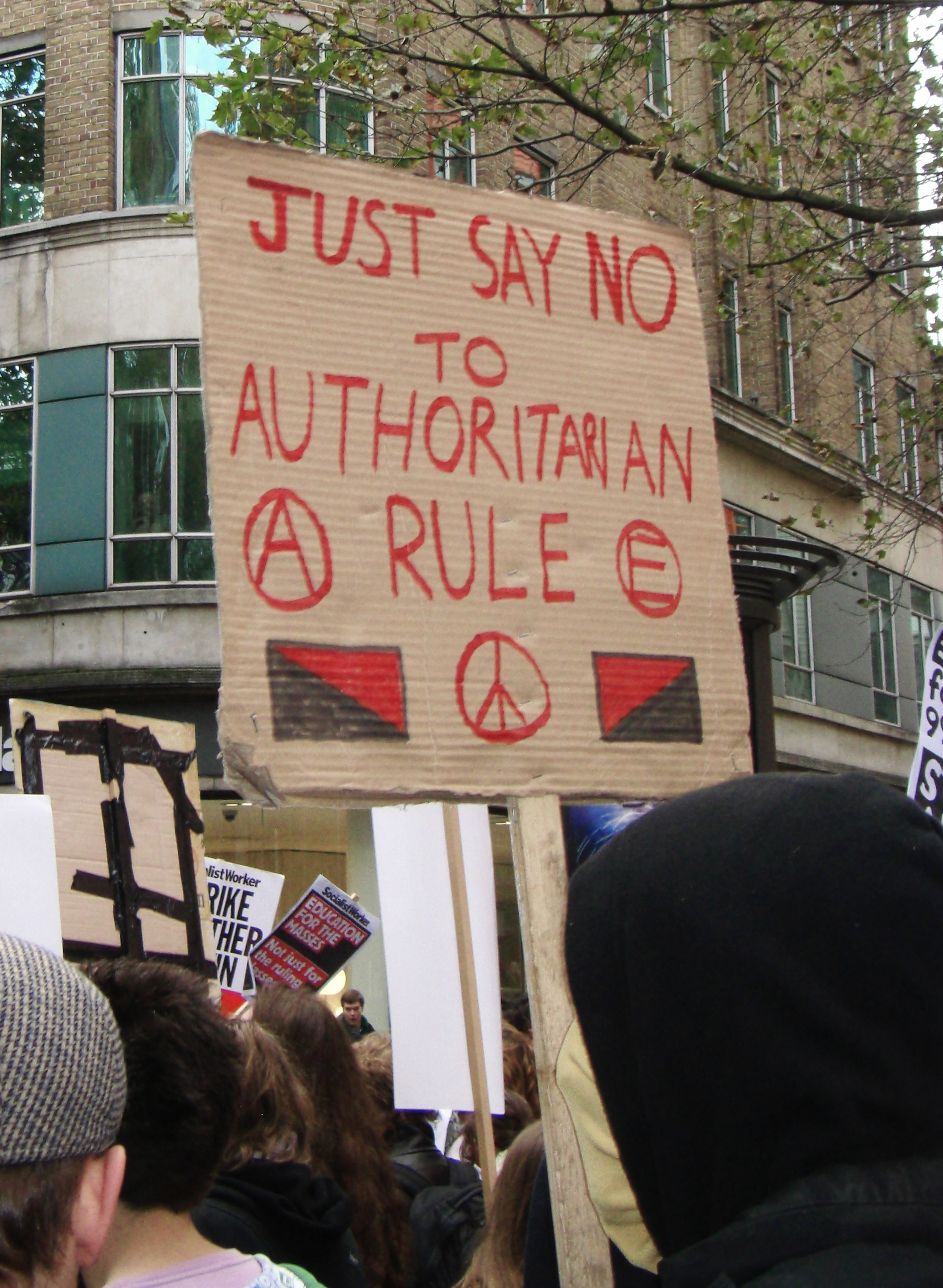
Anarchist protest with sign reading "just say no to authoritarian rule"

Andrew J. Nathan notes that "regime theory holds that authoritarian systems are inherently fragile because of weak legitimacy, overreliance on coercion, over-centralization of decision making, and the predominance of personal power over institutional norms. ... Few authoritarian regimes – be they communist, fascist, corporatist, or personalist – have managed to conduct orderly, peaceful, timely, and stable successions."

Political scientist Theodore M. Vestal writes that authoritarian political systems may be weakened through inadequate responsiveness to either popular or elite demands and that the authoritarian tendency to respond to challenges by exerting tighter control, instead of by adapting, may compromise the legitimacy of an authoritarian state and lead to its collapse.

One exception to this general trend is the endurance of the authoritarian rule of the Chinese Communist Party which has been unusually resilient among authoritarian regimes. In a thesis published in 2003, Nathan posits that this can be attributed to four factors such as (1) "the increasingly norm-bound nature of its succession politics"; (2) "the increase in meritocratic as opposed to factional considerations in the promotion of political elites"; (3) "the differentiation and functional specialization of institutions within the regime"; and (4) "the establishment of institutions for political participation and appeal that strengthen the CCP's legitimacy among the public at large."

Some scholars have challenged notions that authoritarian states are inherently brittle systems that require repression and propaganda to make people comply with the authoritarian regime. Adam Przeworski has challenged this, noting that while authoritarian regimes do take actions that serve to enhance regime survival, they also engage in mundane everyday governance and their subjects do not hold a posture towards the regime at all moments of their life. He writes, "People in autocracies do not incessantly live under the shadow of dramatic historical events; they lead everyday routine lives." Similarly, Thomas Pepinsky has challenged the common mental image of an authoritarian state as one of grim totalitarianism, desperate hardship, strict censorship, and dictatorial orders of murder, torture and disappearances. He writes, "life in authoritarian states is mostly boring and tolerable."

=== Violence ===
Yale University political scientist Milan Svolik argues that violence is a common characteristic of authoritarian systems. Violence tends to be common in authoritarian states because of a lack of independent third parties empowered to settle disputes between the dictator, regime allies, regime soldiers and the masses.

Authoritarians may resort to measures referred to as coup-proofing (structures that make it hard for any small group to seize power). Coup-proofing strategies include strategically placing family, ethnic, and religious groups in the military; creating of an armed force parallel to the regular military; and developing multiple internal security agencies with overlapping jurisdiction that constantly monitor one another. Research shows that some coup-proofing strategies reduce the risk of coups occurring and reduce the likelihood of mass protests. However, coup-proofing reduces military effectiveness, and limits the rents that an incumbent can extract. A 2016 study shows that the implementation of succession rules reduce the occurrence of coup attempts. Succession rules are believed to hamper coordination efforts among coup plotters by assuaging elites who have more to gain by patience than by plotting. According to political scientists Curtis Bell and Jonathan Powell, coup attempts in neighboring countries lead to greater coup-proofing and coup-related repression in a region. A 2017 study finds that countries' coup-proofing strategies are heavily influenced by other countries with similar histories. A 2018 study in the Journal of Peace Research found that leaders who survive coup attempts and respond by purging known and potential rivals are likely to have longer tenures as leaders. A 2019 study in Conflict Management and Peace Science found that personalist dictatorships are more likely to take coup-proofing measures than other authoritarian regimes; the authors argue that this is because "personalists are characterized by weak institutions and narrow support bases, a lack of unifying ideologies and informal links to the ruler."

According to a 2019 study, personalist dictatorships are more repressive than other forms of dictatorship.

== Typologies ==
According to Yale professor Juan José Linz, there are three main types of political regimes today: democracies, totalitarian regimes and, sitting between these two, authoritarian regimes (with hybrid regimes).

According to University of Michigan professor Dan Slater, modern forms of authoritarianism are fundamentally dissimilar from historical forms of nondemocratic rule. He links modern authoritarianism to the era of mass politics, which began with the French Revolution.

=== Similar terms ===
- An authoritarian regime has "a concentration of power in a leader or an elite not constitutionally responsible to the people". Unlike totalitarian states, they will allow social and economic institutions not under governmental control, and tend to rely on passive mass acceptance rather than active popular support.
- An Autocracy is a state/government in which one person possesses "unlimited power".
- A Totalitarian state is "based on subordination of the individual to the state and strict control of all aspects of the life and productive capacity of the nation especially by coercive measures (such as censorship and terrorism)". and are ruled by a single ruling party made up of loyal supporters. Unlike autocracies, which "seek only to gain absolute political power and to outlaw opposition", totalitarian states are characterized by an official ideology, which "seek only to gain absolute political power and to outlaw opposition", and "seek to dominate every aspect of everyone's life as a prelude to world domination".
- A Fascist state is autocratic and based on a political philosophy/movement, (such as that of the Fascisti of pre-WWII Italy) "that exalts nation and often race above the individual and that stands for a centralized autocratic government headed by a dictatorial leader, severe economic and social regimentation, and forcible suppression of opposition".
- Authoritarian personality is the personality type treating authority figures with obedience. A study found evidence for both left-wing and right-wing authoritarianism.
- Authoritarian ethics views an authority can determine the only true ethics.

=== Subtypes ===
Several subtypes of authoritarian regimes have been identified by Linz and others. Linz identified the two most basic subtypes as traditional authoritarian regimes and bureaucratic-military authoritarian regimes:

- Traditional authoritarian regimes are those "in which the ruling authority (generally a single person)" is maintained in power "through a combination of appeals to traditional legitimacy, patron-client ties and repression, which is carried out by an apparatus bound to the ruling authority through personal loyalties." An example is Ethiopia under Haile Selassie I.
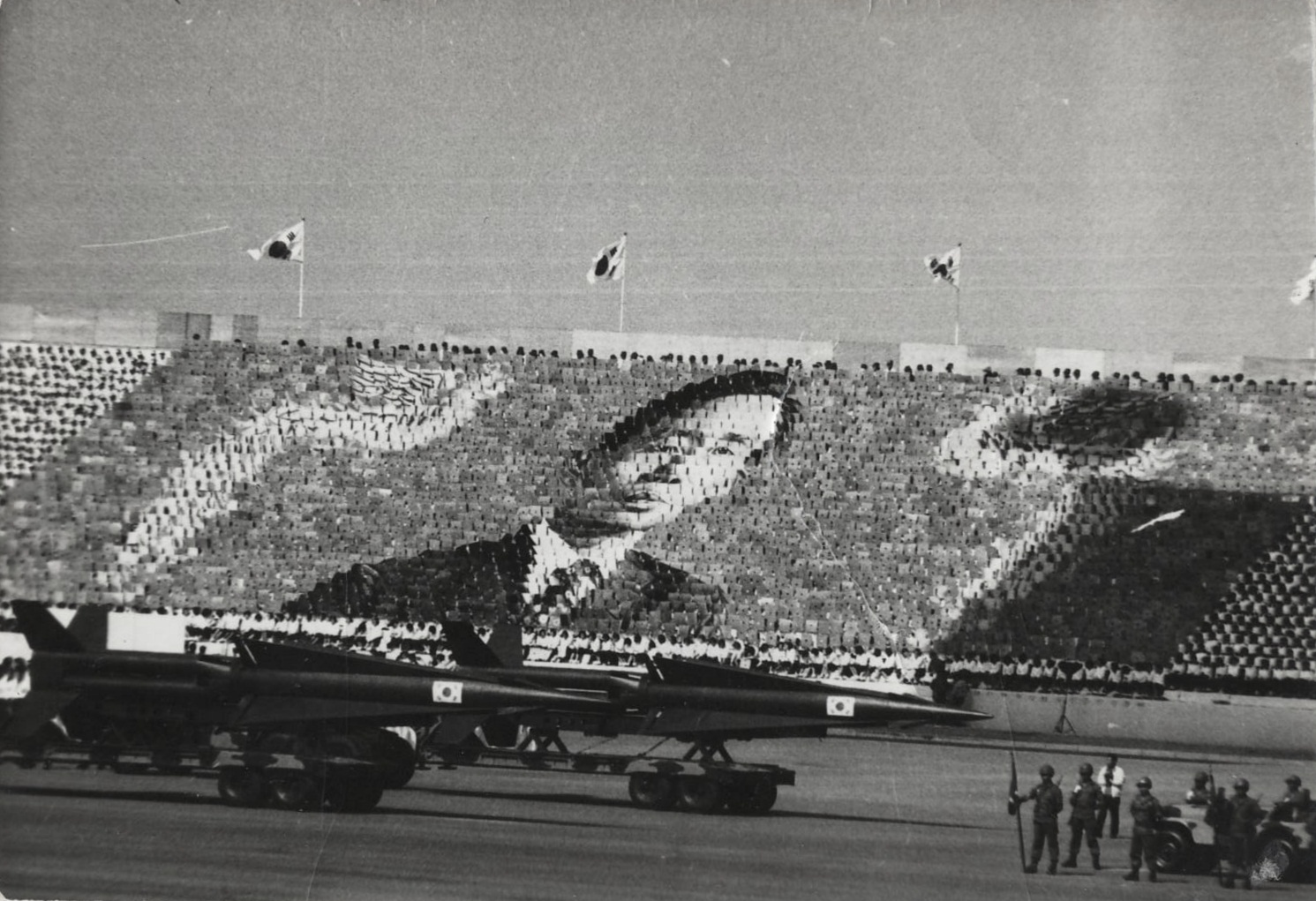
  Honoring South Korean President Park Chung-hee in Army Parade at Armed Forces Day on 1 October 1973
- Bureaucratic-military authoritarian regimes are those "governed by a coalition of military officers and technocrats who act pragmatically (rather than ideologically) within the limits of their bureaucratic mentality." Mark J. Gasiorowski suggests that it is best to distinguish "simple military authoritarian regimes" from "bureaucratic authoritarian regimes" in which "a powerful group of technocrats uses the state apparatus to try to rationalize and develop the economy" such South Korea under Park Chung-hee.

According to Barbara Geddes, there are seven typologies of authoritarian regimes: dominant party regimes, military regime, personalist regimes, monarchies, oligarchic regimes, indirect military regimes, or hybrids of the first three.

Subtypes of authoritarian regimes identified by Linz are corporatist or organic-statistic, racial and ethnic "democracy" and post-totalitarian.

- Corporatist authoritarian regimes "are those in which corporatism institutions are used extensively by the state to coopt and demobilize powerful interest groups." This type has been studied most extensively in Latin America.
- Racial and ethnic "democracies" are those in which "certain racial or ethnic groups enjoy full democratic rights while others are largely or entirely denied those rights", such as in South Africa under apartheid.
- Post-totalitarian authoritarian regimes are those in which totalitarian institutions (such as the party, secret police and state-controlled mass media) remain, but where "ideological orthodoxy has declined in favor of routinization, repression has declined, the state's top leadership is less personalized and more secure, and the level of mass mobilization has declined substantially." Examples include the Russian Federation and Soviet Eastern Bloc states in the mid-1980s. The post-Mao Zedong People's Republic of China was viewed as post-totalitarian in the 1990s and early 2000s, with a limited degree of increase in pluralism and civil society. however, in the 2010s, particularly after Xi Jinping succeeded as General Secretary of the Chinese Communist Party and rose to power in 2012, Chinese state repression sharply increased, aided by digital control and mass surveillance.

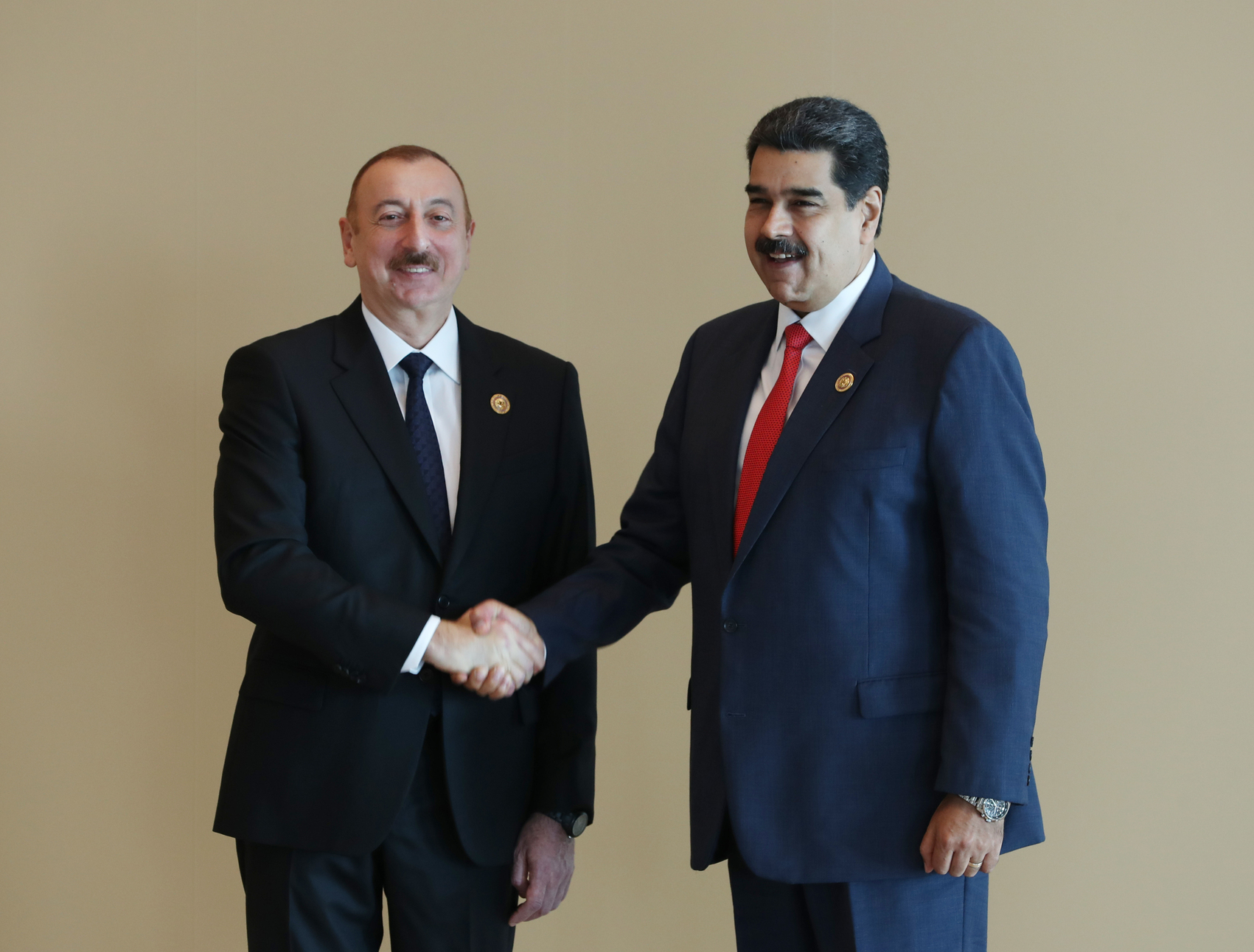
Azerbaijan's President Ilham Aliyev and Venezuela's President Nicolas Maduro on 25 October 2019

Authoritarian regimes are also sometimes subcategorized by whether they are more personalistic or populist. Personalistic authoritarian regimes are characterized by arbitrary rule and authority exercised "mainly through patronage networks and coercion rather than through institutions and formal rules." Personalistic authoritarian regimes have been seen in post-colonial Africa. By contrast, populist authoritarian regimes "are mobilizational regimes in which a strong, charismatic, manipulative leader rules through a coalition involving key lower-class groups." Examples include Argentina under Juan Perón, Russia under Vladimir Putin, Egypt under Gamal Abdel Nasser and Venezuela under Hugo Chávez and Nicolás Maduro.

A typology of authoritarian regimes by political scientists Brian Lai and Dan Slater includes four categories:

- machine (oligarchic party dictatorships);
- bossism (autocratic party dictatorships);
- juntas (oligarchic military dictatorships); and
- strongman (autocratic military dictatorships).

Lai and Slater argue that single-party regimes are better than military regimes at developing institutions (e.g. mass mobilization, patronage networks and coordination of elites) that are effective at continuing the regime's incumbency and diminishing domestic challengers; Lai and Slater also argue that military regimes more often initiate military conflicts or undertake other "desperate measures" to maintain control compared to single-party regimes.

John Duckitt suggests a link between authoritarianism and collectivism, asserting that both stand in opposition to individualism. Duckitt writes that both authoritarianism and collectivism submerge individual rights and goals to group goals, expectations and conformities.

According to Steven Levitsky and Lucan Way, authoritarian regimes that are created in social revolutions are much more durable than other kinds of authoritarian regimes.

=== Authoritarianism and democracy ===
Democracy Index by the Economist Intelligence Unit, 2024. Blue countries are democratic, yellow are hybrid regimes, and brown are authoritarian governments.

V-Dem Democracy Indices for 2025 with blue more democratic and brown more authoritarian

Authoritarianism and democracy are not necessarily fundamental opposites and may be thought of as poles at opposite ends of a scale, so that it is possible for some democracies to possess authoritarian elements, and for an authoritarian system to have democratic elements. Authoritarian regimes may also be partly responsive to citizen grievances, although this is generally only regarding grievances that do not undermine the stability of the regime. An illiberal democracy, or procedural democracy, is distinguished from liberal democracy, or substantive democracy, in that illiberal democracies lack features such as the rule of law, protections for minority groups, an independent judiciary and the real separation of powers.

A further distinction is that liberal democracies have rarely made war with one another; research has extended the theory and finds that more democratic countries tend to have few wars (sometimes called militarized interstate disputes) causing fewer battle deaths with one another and that democracies have far fewer civil wars.

Research shows that the democratic nations have significantly less democide or murder by government. Those were also moderately developed nations before applying liberal democratic policies. Research by the World Bank suggests that political institutions are extremely important in determining the prevalence of corruption and that parliamentary systems, political stability and freedom of the press are all associated with lower corruption.

A 2006 study by economist Alberto Abadie has concluded that terrorism is most common in nations with intermediate political freedom. The nations with the least terrorism are the most and least democratic nations, and that "transitions from an authoritarian regime to a democracy may be accompanied by temporary increases in terrorism." Studies in 2013 and 2017 similarly found a nonlinear relationship between political freedom and terrorism, with the most terrorist attacks occurring in partial democracies and the fewest in "strict autocracies and full-fledged democracies." A 2018 study by Amichai Magen demonstrated that liberal democracies and polyarchies not only suffer fewer terrorist attacks as compared to other regime types, but also suffer fewer casualties in terrorist attacks as compared to other regime types, which may be attributed to higher-quality democracies' responsiveness to their citizens' demands, including "the desire for physical safety", resulting in "investment in intelligence, infrastructure protection, first responders, social resilience, and specialized medical care" which averts casualties. Magen also stated that terrorism in closed autocracies sharply increased starting in 2013.

Within national democratic governments, there may be subnational authoritarian enclaves; prominent examples include the Southern United States after Reconstruction, as well as areas of contemporary Argentina and Mexico.

==== Competitive authoritarian regimes ====
Another type of authoritarian regime is the competitive authoritarian regime, a type of civilian regime that arose in the post-Cold War era. In a competitive authoritarian regime, "formal democratic institutions exist and are widely viewed as the primary means of gaining power, but ... incumbents' abuse of the state places them at a significant advantage vis-à-vis their opponents." The term was coined by Steven Levitsky and Lucan A. Way in a 2002 Journal of Democracy article, and later expanded upon in their 2010 book of the same name, to discuss a type of hybrid regime that emerged during and after the Cold War.

Competitive authoritarian regimes differ from fully authoritarian regimes in that elections are regularly held, the opposition can openly operate without a high risk of exile or imprisonment and "democratic procedures are sufficiently meaningful for opposition groups to take them seriously as arenas through which to contest for power." Competitive authoritarian regimes lack core democratic criteria: free elections, robust civil liberties, and a level playing field.

=== Authoritarianism and fascism ===
Authoritarianism is considered a core concept of fascism and scholars agree that a fascist regime is foremost an authoritarian form of government, although not all authoritarian regimes are fascist. While authoritarianism is a defining characteristic of fascism, scholars argue that more distinguishing traits are needed to make an authoritarian regime fascist.

=== Authoritarian socialism ===
Authoritarian socialism, or socialism from above, is an economic and political system supporting some form of socialist economics while rejecting political pluralism. As a term, it represents a set of economic-political systems describing themselves as "socialist" and rejecting the liberal-democratic concepts of multi-party politics, freedom of assembly, habeas corpus, and freedom of expression, either due to fear of counter-revolution or as a means to socialist ends. Journalists and scholars have characterised several countries, most notably the Soviet Union, China, Cuba, and their allies, as authoritarian socialist states.

=== Libertarian authoritarianism ===
Multiple scholars have identified a form of libertarian authoritarianism emerging in the early 21st century. Wendy Brown describes it as emerging from neoliberalism, opposing both democracy and public institutions while defining freedom in terms of speech and actions that promote homophobia, white supremacy and male privilege. Other scholars have connected it to QAnon and to the Argentinian Presidency of Javier Milei.

Carolin Amlinger and Oliver Nachtwey, in Offended Freedom: The Rise of Libertarian Authoritarianism, describe libertarian authoritarianism as arising from a backlash to government efforts to contain the COVID-19 pandemic and, more broadly, against the increasing complexity of the world, ultimately leading to hostility towards democracy. Writing in Jacobin and New Statesman, Amlinger and Nachtwey define libertarian authoritarians as those who believe in the abolition of the democratic state on the basis of its restrictions on individual freedoms, and "consider the democratic state itself, the authorities and their regulations, to be invasive and harmful"; they described the fundamental basis of libertarian authoritarianism to be based in "post-truth politics", and that in the late-modern era, believers validate their opinions "with proto-scientific evidence, rumours, conspiracy theories and fake news". They describe neoliberalism as an additional factor contributing towards the recent rise of the ideology. Individuals who identify as modern adherents to the ideology include Peter Thiel, Elon Musk, and Javier Milei, having merged their libertarianism with their "authoritarian tendencies".

=== Authoritarianism and totalitarianism ===
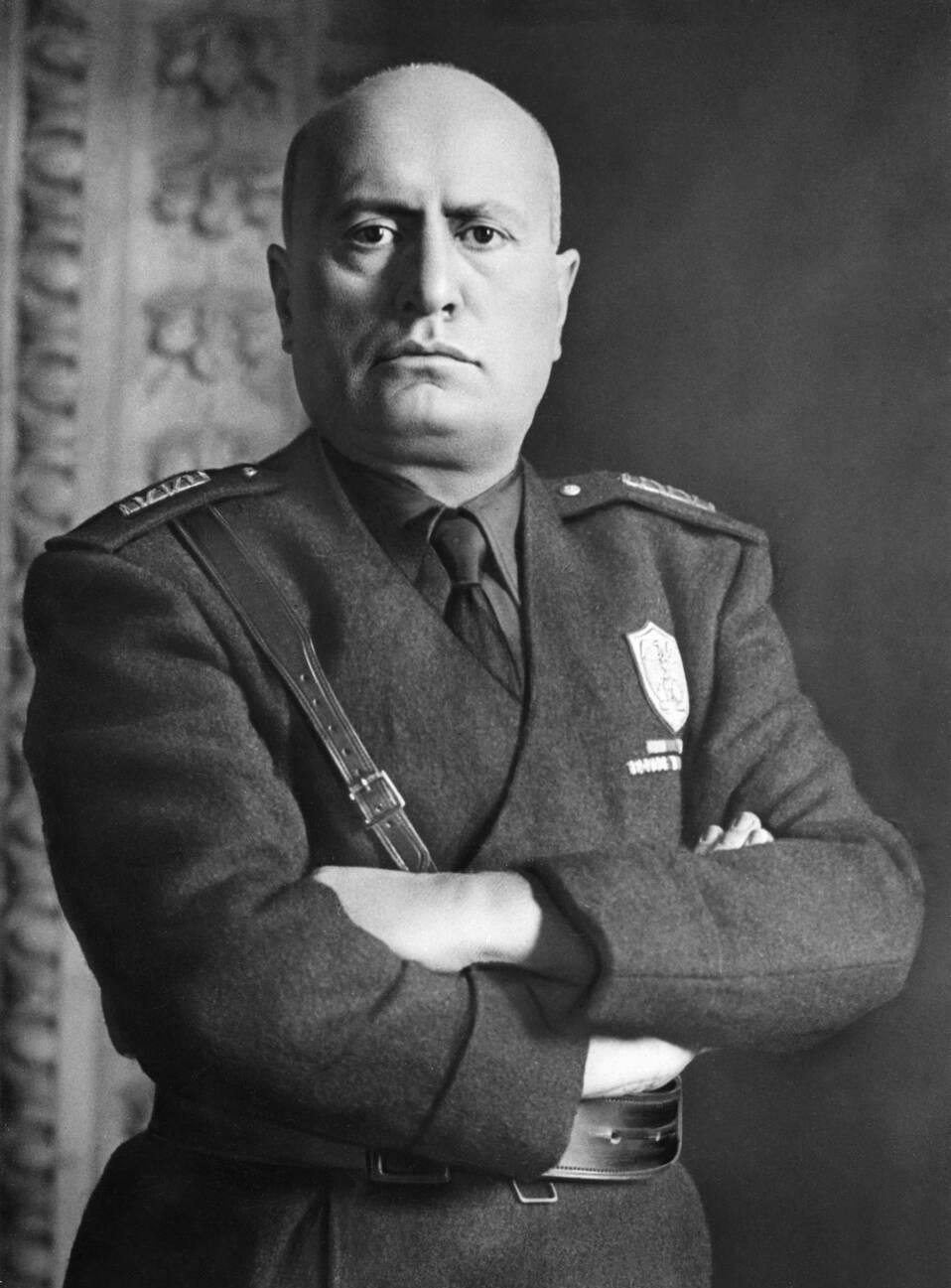
Benito Mussolini, the founder of Italian fascism, called his regime the "Totalitarian State": "Everything in the State, nothing outside the State, nothing against the State."

Totalitarianism is a label used by various political scientists to characterize the most tyrannical strain of authoritarian systems; in which the ruling elite, often subservient to a dictator, exert near-total control of the social, political, economic, cultural and religious aspects of society in the territories under its governance.

Linz distinguished new forms of authoritarianism from personalistic dictatorships and totalitarian states, taking Francoist Spain as an example. Unlike personalistic dictatorships, new forms of authoritarianism have institutionalized representation of a variety of actors (in Spain's case, including the military, the Catholic Church, Falange, monarchists, technocrats and others). Unlike totalitarian states, the regime relies on passive mass acceptance rather than popular support. According to Juan Linz the distinction between an authoritarian regime and a totalitarian one is that an authoritarian regime seeks to suffocate politics and political mobilization while totalitarianism seeks to control and use them. Authoritarianism primarily differs from totalitarianism in that social and economic institutions exist that are not under governmental control. Building on the work of Yale political scientist Juan Linz, Paul C. Sondrol of the University of Colorado at Colorado Springs has examined the characteristics of authoritarian and totalitarian dictators and organized them in a chart:

	Totalitarianism	Authoritarianism
Charisma	High	Low
Role conception	Leader as function	Leader as individual
Ends of power	Public	Private
Corruption	Low	High
Official ideology	Yes	No
Limited pluralism	No	Yes
Legitimacy	Yes	No

Sondrol argues that while both authoritarianism and totalitarianism are forms of autocracy, they differ in three key dichotomies:

(1) Unlike their bland and generally unpopular authoritarian brethren, totalitarian dictators develop a charismatic "mystique" and a mass-based, pseudo-democratic interdependence with their followers via the conscious manipulation of a prophetic image.

(2) Concomitant role conceptions differentiate totalitarians from authoritarians. Authoritarians view themselves as individual beings largely content to control and often maintain the status quo. Totalitarian self-conceptions are largely teleological. The tyrant is less a person than an indispensable function to guide and reshape the universe.

(3) Consequently, the utilisation of power for personal aggrandizement is more evident among authoritarians than totalitarians. Lacking the binding appeal of ideology, authoritarians support their rule by a mixture of instilling fear and granting rewards to loyal collaborators, engendering a kleptocracy.

Compared to totalitarianism, "the authoritarian state still maintains a certain distinction between state and society. It is only concerned with political power and as long as that is not contested it gives society a certain degree of liberty. Totalitarianism, on the other hand, invades private life and asphyxiates it." Another distinction is that "authoritarianism is not animated by utopian ideals in the way totalitarianism is. It does not attempt to change the world and human nature." Carl Joachim Friedrich writes that "a totalist ideology, a party reinforced by a secret police, and monopoly control of ... industrial mass society" are the three features of totalitarian regimes that distinguish them from other autocracies.

Greg Yudin, a professor of political philosophy at the Moscow School of Social and Economic Sciences, argues "political passivity and civic disengagement" are "key features" of authoritarianism, while totalitarianism relies on "mass mobilization, terror and homogeneity of beliefs".

== Economic effects ==
In 2010, Dani Rodrik wrote that democracies outperform autocracies in terms of long-term economic growth, economic stability, adjustments to external economic shocks, human capital investment, and economic equality. A 2019 study by Daron Acemoglu, Suresh Naidu, Pascual Restrepo, and James A. Robinson found that democracy increases GDP per capita by about 20% over the long-term. According to Amartya Sen, no functioning liberal democracy has ever suffered a large-scale famine. Studies suggest that several health indicators (life expectancy and infant and maternal mortality) have a stronger and more significant association with democracy than they have with GDP per capita, size of the public sector or income inequality. States that undergo democratic backsliding are more likely to face downgrades in their sovereign bond ratings.

One of the few areas that some scholars have theorized that autocracies may have an advantage, is in industrialization. In the 20th century, Seymour Martin Lipset argued that low-income authoritarian regimes have certain technocratic "efficiency-enhancing advantages" over low-income democracies that gives authoritarian regimes an advantage in economic development. By contrast, Morton H. Halperin, Joseph T. Siegle and Michael M. Weinstein (2005) argue that democracies "realize superior development performance" over authoritarianism, pointing out that poor democracies are more likely to have steadier economic growth and less likely to experience economic and humanitarian catastrophes (such as refugee crises) than authoritarian regimes; that civil liberties in democracies act as a curb on corruption and misuse of resources; and that democracies are more adaptable than authoritarian regimes.

== Military effects ==
According to Allan C. Stam and Dan Reiter, liberal democracies have an advantage in battlefield performance over non-democracies and illiberal democracies. They argue that this democratic advantage is derived from the fact that democratic soldiers fight harder, democratic states tend to ally together in war, and democracies can employ more economic resources towards combat. Due to elevated fears against military coups against authoritarian regimes, authoritarian regimes may also put loyalists in the military. This may reduce military effectiveness as loyalty is prioritized over experience when filling key positions within the military. However, critics argue that democracy itself makes little difference in war and that some other factors, such as overall power, determine whether a country would achieve victory or face defeat. In some cases, such as the Vietnam War, democracy may even have contributed to defeat. Jasen Castillo argues that autocratic states may in certain circumstances have an advantage over democracies; for example, authoritarian regimes may have ideologies that require unconditional loyalty, which may contribute to military cohesion.

== Historical trends ==
=== Pre-World War II ===
Authoritarian rule before World War II includes short-lived dictatorships and has been claimed to be understudied.

=== Post-World War II anti-authoritarianism ===
Both World War II (ending in 1945) and the Cold War (ending in 1991) resulted in the replacement of authoritarian regimes by either democratic regimes or regimes that were less authoritarian.

World War II saw the defeat of the Axis powers by the Allied powers. All the Axis powers (Nazi Germany, Fascist Italy and Imperial Japan) had totalitarian or authoritarian governments, and two of the three were replaced by governments based on democratic constitutions. The Allied powers were an alliance of Democratic states and (later) the Communist Soviet Union. In Western Europe, the initial post-war era embraced pluralism and freedom of expression in areas that had been under control of authoritarian regimes. The memory of fascism and Nazism was denigrated. The new Federal Republic of Germany banned its expression. In reaction to the centralism of the Nazi state, the new constitution of West Germany (Federal Republic of Germany) exercised "separation of powers" and placed "law enforcement firmly in the hands" of the sixteen Länder or states of the republic, not with the federal German government, at least not at first.

Culturally there was also a strong sense of anti-authoritarianism based on anti-fascism in Western Europe. This was attributed to the active resistance from occupation and to fears arising from the development of superpowers. Anti-authoritarianism also became associated with countercultural and bohemian movements such as the Beat Generation in the 1950s, the hippies in the 1960s and punks in the 1970s.

In South America, Argentina, Bolivia, Brazil, Paraguay, Chile and Uruguay moved away from dictatorships to democracy between 1982 and 1990.

With the fall of the Berlin Wall in 1989 and the Soviet Union in 1991, the other authoritarian/totalitarian "half" of the Allied Powers of World War II collapsed. This led not so much to revolt against authority in general, but to the belief that authoritarian states (and state control of economies) were outdated. The idea that "liberal democracy was the final form toward which all political striving was directed" became very popular in Western countries and was celebrated in Francis Fukuyama's book The End of History and the Last Man. According to Charles H. Fairbanks Jr., "all the new states that stumbled out of the ruins of the Soviet bloc, except Uzbekistan and Turkmenistan, seemed indeed to be moving towards democracy in the early 1990s" as were the countries of East Central Europe and the Balkans.

In December 2010, the Arab Spring arose in response to unrest over economic stagnation but also in opposition to oppressive authoritarian regimes, first in Tunisia, and spreading to Libya, Egypt, Yemen, Syria, Bahrain and elsewhere. Regimes were toppled in Tunisia, Libya, Egypt and partially in Yemen while other countries saw riots, civil wars or insurgencies. Most Arab Spring revolutions failed to lead to enduring democratization. A decade after the Arab Spring, Tunisia stood as the sole, albeit fragile, democratic success story, while Egypt reverted to authoritarian military rule, and Libya, Syria, and Yemen descended into catastrophic civil wars.

=== 21st century ===
Since 2005, observers noted what some have called a "democratic recession", although some such as Steven Levitsky and Lucan Way have disputed that there was a significant democratic decline before 2013. In 2018, the Freedom House declared that from 2006 to 2018 "113 countries" around the world showed "a net decline" in "political rights and civil liberties" while "only 62" experienced "a net improvement." Its 2020 report marked the fourteenth consecutive year of declining scores. By 2020, all countries marked as "not free" by Freedom House had also developed practices of transnational repression, aiming to police and control dissent beyond state borders.

International trends in democracy/authoritarianism
	countries becoming more democratic	countries becoming more authoritarian
late 1990s	72	3
2021	15	33
source: V-Dem

Writing in 2018, American political journalist David Frum stated: "The hopeful world of the very late 20th century – the world of NAFTA and an expanding NATO; of the World Wide Web 1.0 and liberal interventionism; of the global spread of democracy under leaders such as Václav Havel and Nelson Mandela – now looks battered and delusive."

Michael Ignatieff wrote that Fukuyama's idea of liberalism vanquishing authoritarianism "now looks like a quaint artifact of a vanished unipolar moment" and Fukuyama himself expressed concern. By 2018, only one Arab Spring uprising (that in Tunisia) resulted in a transition to constitutional democratic governance and a "resurgence of authoritarianism and Islamic extremism" in the region was dubbed the Arab Winter.

Various explanations have been offered for the new spread of authoritarianism. They include the downside of globalization, and the subsequent rise of populism and neo-nationalism, and the success of the Beijing Consensus, i.e. the authoritarian model of the People's Republic of China. In countries such as the United States, factors blamed for the growth of authoritarianism include the 2008 financial crisis and slower real wage growth as well as social media's elimination of so-called "gatekeepers" of knowledge – the equivalent of disintermediation in economics – so that a large fraction of the population considers to be opinion what were once "viewed as verifiable facts" – including everything from the danger of global warming to the preventing the spread of disease through vaccination – and considers to be fact what are actually only unproven fringe opinions.

In United States politics, white supremacist groups such as the Ku Klux Klan, neo-Nazi skinheads, and adherents of the Christian Identity, ideology have long operated as a loose network. In the internet age, far-right extremists throughout the U.S. and much of the West have consolidated further into a movement known as the Alt-Right, which has inspired numerous terrorist attacks while at the same time increasing the mainstream appeal of white supremacism. According to Azani et al.:

The current resurgence of far-right ideology may be explained by a variety of factors, primarily, the strategic adjustment of white supremacists to soften overtly racist rhetoric in order to appeal to a wider audience. This new discourse attempts to normalize white supremacy, developing intellectual and theoretical foundations for racism based on the notion that the white race is at risk of eradication, threatened by the growing population of immigrants and people of colour. The pre-existing, offensive white supremacist, fascist and neo-Nazi ideas that drove the white power movement of the twentieth century were thus rebranded through a new innocuous defensive frame of white victimhood. As such, the new strategy of racist rhetoric has allowed the movement to co-opt mainstream political debates surrounding immigration and globalization, drawing large audiences through a deliberate obfuscation of the underlying ideology.

Far-right extremism has played a key role in promoting the Great Replacement and White genocide conspiracy theories, and an "acceleration" of racial conflict through violent means such as assassinations, murders, terrorist attacks, and societal collapse in order to achieve the building of a white ethnostate. While many contemporary extreme far-right groups eschew the hierarchical structure of other authoritarian political organizations, they often explicitly promote cultural authoritarianism alongside xenophobia, racism, antisemitism, homophobia and misogyny, as well as authoritarian government interventions against perceived societal problems.

=== Contemporary ===
There is no one consensus definition of authoritarianism, but several annual measurements are attempted. States characterized as authoritarian are typically not rated as democracies by The Economist Democracy Index or as 'free' by Freedom House's Freedom in the World index, and do not reach a high score on V-Dem Democracy Indices.

==== United States ====
Beginning in October 2025, The New York Times editorial board created an Autocracy Index showing erosion of US democracy using various benchmarks, offering "a way to understand how much Mr. Trump is eroding American democracy" since his January 2025 inauguration.

According to an April 2025 survey, known as Bright Line Watch, of more than 500 U.S.-based political scientists, the vast majority think the United States is moving from liberal democracy to a form of authoritarianism.

During Donald Trump's second presidency, the Trump administration has undertaken a series of actions using the government to target his political opponents and civil society. News outlets described his actions as part of his promised "retribution" and "revenge" campaign, within the context of a strongly personalist and leader-centered conception of politics. During his 2024 presidential campaign, Trump repeatedly stated that he had "every right" to go after his political opponents.

He undertook a massive expansion of presidential power under a maximalist interpretation of the unitary executive theory. Several of his actions ignored or violated federal laws, regulations, and the Constitution according to American legal scholars, the Government Accountability Office, and federal judges. He threatened, signed executive actions against, and ordered investigations into his political opponents, his critics, and organizations aligned with the Democratic Party. He politicized the civil service, undertaking mass layoffs of government employees to recruit workers more loyal to himself. He ended the post-Watergate norm of Justice Department independence, weaponizing it and ordering it to target his political enemies. He utilized several government agencies to retaliate against his political enemies and continued filing personal lawsuits against his political opponents, companies, and news organizations that angered him.

By July 2025, Trump had extracted more than $1.2 billion in settlements in a "cultural crackdown" against a variety of institutions that largely chose to settle rather than fight back. He engaged in an unprecedented targeting of law firms and lawyers that previously represented positions adverse to himself. Trump targeted higher education by demanding it give federal oversight of curriculum and targeted activists, legal immigrants, tourists, and students with visas who expressed criticism of his policies or engaged in pro-Palestinian advocacy. He also detained and deported United States citizens.

Trump's actions against civil society have been described by legal experts and political scientists as authoritarian and contributing to democratic backsliding, as well as negatively impacting freedom of the press, free speech, and the rule of law.

== See also ==
- Absolute monarchy
- Authoritarian capitalism
- Authoritarian conservatism
- Authoritarian nationalism
- Authoritarian socialism
- Criticism of democracy
- Ecoauthoritarianism
- Left-wing dictatorship
- List of current state leaders by date of assumption of office
- Managed democracy
- Militarism
- Religion and authoritarianism
- Right-wing dictatorship
- Techno-authoritarianism
- U.S. policy toward authoritarian governments

== Bibliography ==
- Amandae, Sonja (2003). Rationalizing Capitalist Democracy: The Cold War Origins of Rational Choice Liberalism. University of Chicago Press. ISBN 978-0-226-01654-2.
- Ginsburg, Tom; Simpser, Alberto, eds. (2013). Constitutions in Authoritarian Regimes. doi:10.1017/CBO9781107252523. ISBN 978-1-107-04766-2.
- Huntington, Samuel P. (1970). Authoritarian Politics in Modern Society: The Dynamics of Established One-party Systems. Basic Books. ISBN 978-0-465-00569-7.
- Levitsky, Steven; Way, Lucan A. (2010). Competitive Authoritarianism: Hybrid Regimes after the Cold War. Cambridge University Press. doi:10.1017/CBO9780511781353. ISBN 978-1-139-49148-8.
- Linz, Juan J. (1964). "An Authoritarian Regime: The Case of Spain". In Allard, Eric; Littunen, Yrjo. Cleavages, Ideologies and Party Systems. Helsinki: Academic Bookstore.
- Löwy, Michael (1986). "Mass organization, party, and state: Democracy in the transition to socialism". Transition and Development: Problems of Third World Socialism. Vol. 94. OCLC 949351144.
