= Molly Przeworski =

American population geneticist

- Born: Molly Fox Przeworski
- Education: Princeton University (A.B.); University of Chicago (Ph.D.)
- Family: Adam Przeworski (father); Andrzej Przeworski (great-uncle)
- Awards: Sloan Research Fellowship (2004) Rosalind Franklin (2007) Genetics Society of America American Society of Human Genetics (2023)
- Scientific career
- Fields: Population genetics
- Institutions: Columbia University
- Thesis: Natural selection and patterns of genetic variability in Drosophila and humans (2000)
- Doctoral advisor: Brian Charlesworth; Dick Hudson
- Other academic advisors: Peter Donnelly

Molly Fox Przeworski is an American population geneticist and professor in the Department of Biological Sciences at Columbia University, where she is also affiliated with the Department of Systems Biology, Center for Computational Biology and Bioinformatics, and Program for Mathematical Genomics. Her research focuses on identifying the effects of natural selection on genetic variation in human and non-human organisms.

Przeworski graduated with an A.B. in mathematics from Princeton University in 1994 after completing a senior thesis, titled "The irreducible representations of SL₂(Fq)", under the supervision of Zeev Rudnick. She then pursued graduate studies at the University of Chicago, where she received a Ph.D. from the Committee on Evolutionary Biology in 2000 after completing a doctoral dissertation, titled "Natural selection and patterns of genetic variability in Drosophila and humans", under the supervision of Brian Charlesworth and Dick Hudson.

Przeworski was elected as a member of the American Academy of Arts and Sciences and a member of the National Academy of Sciences in 2020.
