= Religion and authoritarianism =

Sociological correlation

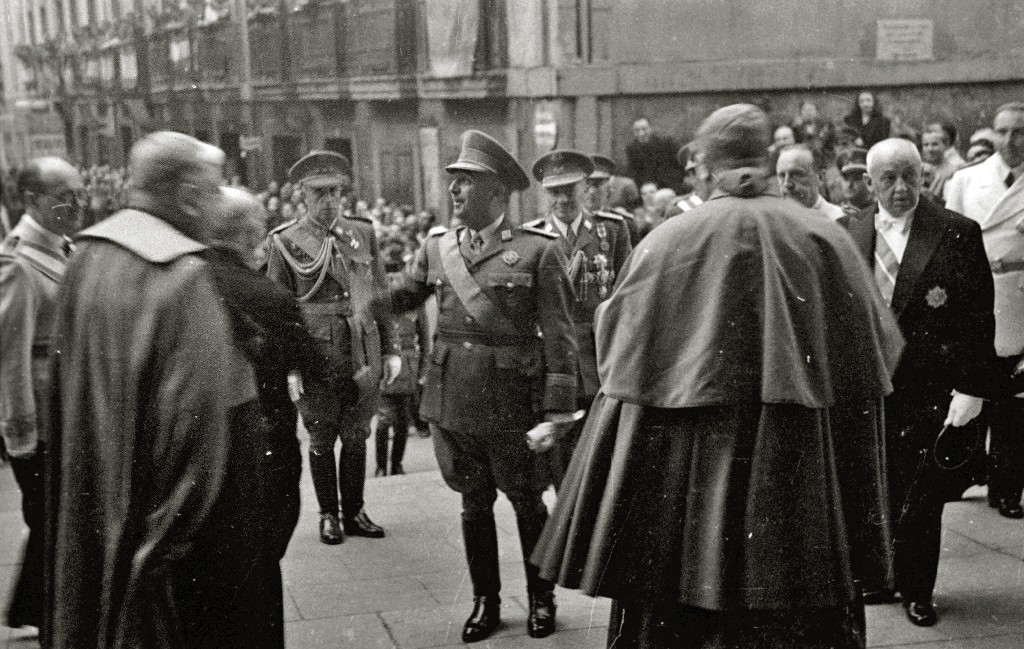
Spanish dictator Francisco Franco with Catholic Church dignitaries in 1946

Most measures of religiosity, such as church attendance and affiliation, are positively correlated with the authoritarian personality cluster, which includes submission to authority, conventionality, and intolerance of out-groups. The correlation is especially strong between religious fundamentalism (defined as belief in an "inerrant set of religious teachings") and authoritarianism, both of which are characterized by low openness to experience, high rigidity, and low cognitive complexity. In particular, authoritarianism "is positively associated with a religion that is conventional, unquestioned, and unreflective".

The Roman princeps ruled with authoritarian power and an authoritarian understanding of the Roman empire’s state religion (paganism from 27 BC until 312 AD).

Up to 312 AD, Rome oppressed and persecuted its Christian minority, due to the fact that Christians confessed the divinity of Jesus and denied the divinity of the Roman gods and of the emperor.

Persecution of the early Christians was stopped by the Edict of Milan in 312.

Since 312 AD, the Nicene Fathers supported the authoritarian regime of the Roman emperor (Saint Constantine I.) after his conversion to Christianity.

However, despite his authoritarian rule, Constantine was the first emperor to legalise Christianity and allow complete religious freedom for Jews, Christians and pagans alike.

Nonetheless, Constantine did not alter the empire’s state religion and the status of paganism as the state religion.

Subsequently, the Catholic and Orthodox Church sided with authoritarian kings, governments, monarchs, dictatorships and other unrestrained rulers.

Innocent III was opposed to the Charter of Liberties, which was supposed to protect the aristocracy and the common people from authoritarianism.

Innocent III also annulled the Magna Carta.

However, under subsequent post-medieval pontificates the church did not discourage restrained forms of monarchy such as parliamentarianism.

By the 1960s and 1970s, the Catholic Church began to articulate clearer and louder disapproval of authoritarianism.

It is very significant to mention that the Catholic Church now despises authoritarianism and views it as heretical, in the wake of Vatican II and John Paul II.

== Background ==
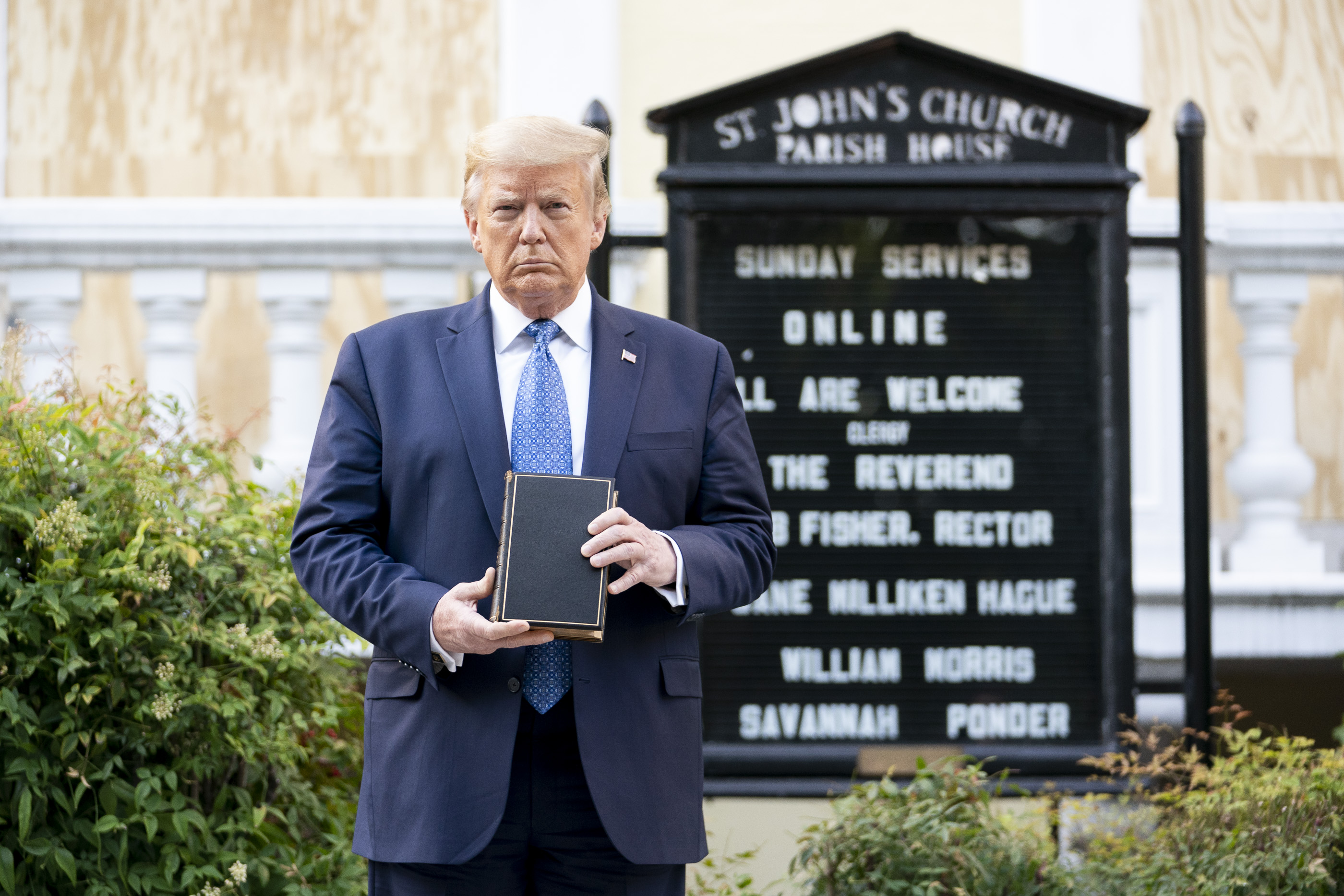
United States president Donald Trump's photo op at St. John's Church has been described as following the "playbook of authoritarian-leaning leaders the world over".

Hundreds of scientific articles have been published investigating the connections between religion and authoritarianism. There is a distinction between psychology, which treats authoritarianism as innate to the personality, and sociology, which considers authoritarianism a result of one's environment and posits that it may be influenced by factors such as religion.

A longitudinal study of Americans born in the 1920s found that this effect held for traditional church-centered religion but not for those that are seeking non-institutional spirituality. The latter mode of religion is "characterized by an openness to new experiences and by creativity and experimentation, characteristics that are antithetical to the conventionality that adheres in authoritarianism".

== Specific cases ==
Throughout history, authoritarian leaders have adopted different policies towards religion, from state atheism to drawing support from religion or co-opting religious leaders and institutions. As part of civil society, organized religion serves as a mediator between the state and citizens, even under authoritarian governments. In Russia, the Russian Orthodox Church enjoys a state monopoly and state subsidies, as well as a blasphemy law that protects it from criticism. Authoritarian leaders may fear that religion will be the source of political opposition, instability, or outright rebellion. Indeed, some scholars and political leaders, such as Václav Havel, have praised the role of religion in undermining authoritarian governments. However, in other cases, religions have engaged in alliances with the state, and religious institutions are not necessarily pockets of dissent or incubators of democracy. Unregistered or minority religions have been suppressed by state authoritarian regimes, such as house churches in China. In 1999, Falun Gong practitioners launched widespread protests against the Chinese government, which led to the persecution of Falun Gong.

== See also ==
- Catholicism in the Second Spanish Republic
- Christian right
- Hindutva
- Integralism
- Islamic state
- Jewish right
- Russian Orthodox Church during the Russian revolution
- Wahhabism
- Salafism

== Bibliography ==
- Koesel, Karrie J. (2014). Religion and Authoritarianism: Cooperation, Conflict, and the Consequences. Cambridge University Press. ISBN 978-1-107-03706-9.
- The Righteous Mind: Why Good People are Divided by Politics and Religion
