= Fernando Limongi =

Brazilian political scientist

Fernando de Magalhães Papaterra Limongi
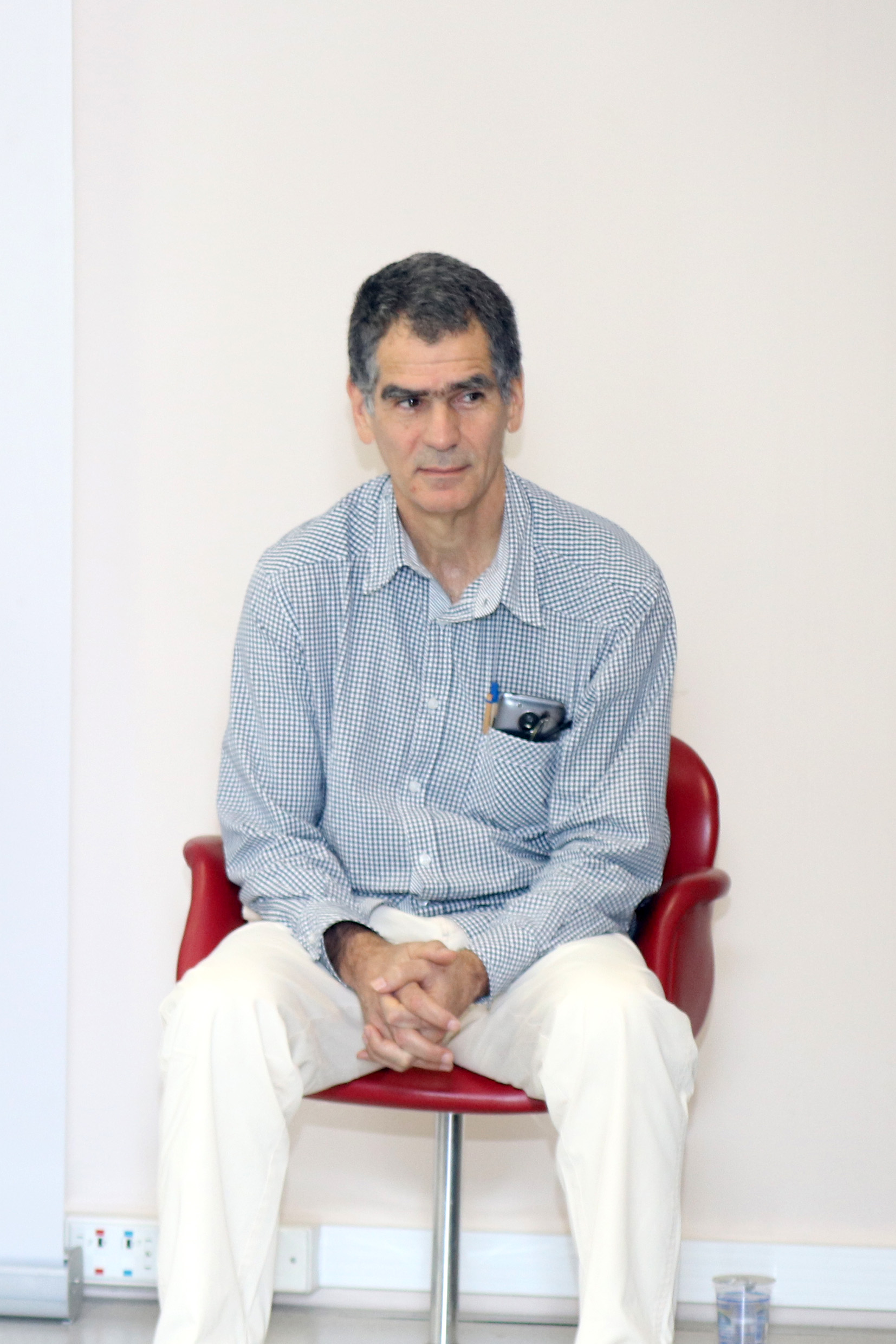
- Awards: Woodrow Wilson Prize (2001)

Academic background
- Education: University of Chicago
- Doctoral advisor: Adam Przeworski
- Influences: Bolívar Lamounier; Wanderley Guilherme dos Santos; Olavo Brasil de Lima Júnior

Academic work
- Discipline: Political science
- Sub-discipline: Comparative politics
- Institutions: University of São Paulo; Fundação Getúlio Vargas
- Main interests: Democratization; Politics of Brazil

Fernando de Magalhães Papaterra Limongi is a Brazilian political scientist who was a member of the Department of Political Science in the Faculty of Philosophy, Literature and Social Sciences at the University of São Paulo (USP) from 1986 until 2018, and is now a professor in the São Paulo School of Economics at the Fundação Getúlio Vargas.

He earned his PhD in political science at the University of Chicago in 1993, where he worked with various political scientists like Adam Przeworski (his advisor) with whom he published several works. Returning to Brazil and to USP in 1992, he took on many responsibilities in the Brazilian Center of Analysis and Planning, and became one of the members of the Chamber of Researchers at the center.

Limongi has provided commentary for newspapers on Brazilian politics. For example, in 2006, Limongi was challenged by the online publication IDG Now! to assess the Wikipedia articles of the candidates in the general election for Brazilian President.

== Awards ==
Limongi has received several awards:

- 1998: Gregory Luebbert Award for the Best paper in Comparative Politics from the American Political Science Association, given for the article: Adam Przeworski, Fernando Limongi, "Modernization: Theories and Facts", World Politics 49, No. 2 (January 1997): 155-183
- 1999: Prêmio ANPOCS/CNPq for the best empirical work in social science for the book Executivo e Legislativo na Nova Ordem Constitucional (co-written with Argelina Maria Cheibub Figueiredo)
- 2001: Woodrow Wilson Prize from the American Political Science Association with Adam Przeworski, Michael E. Alvarez, and Jose Antonio Cheibub for their book Democracy and Development
- 2006: Prêmio Olavo Brasil de Lima Jr., from the Associação Brasileira de Ciência Política

== Selected works ==
- Argelina Cheibub Figueiredo, Fernando Limongi (1999). Executivo e Legislativo na Nova Ordem Constitucional. Rio de Janeiro: FGV. 231 pages. ISBN 8522502919
- Adam Przeworski (co-authors: Michael E. Alvarez, Jose Antonio Cheibub, Fernando Limongi) (2000). Democracy and Development; Political Institutions and Well-Being in the World, 1950-1990. New York: Cambridge University Press. 336 pages. ISBN 0-521-79379-3
