= Adam Przeworski =

Polish-American political scientist (born 1940)

- Born: 5 May 1940 (age 86); Warsaw, Poland
- Children: Molly Przeworski
- Relatives: Andrzej Przeworski (uncle)
- Awards: National Academy of Sciences (2021); Johan Skytte Prize (2010); Woodrow Wilson Prize (2001); American Academy of Arts and Sciences (1991)

Academic background
- Education: University of Warsaw (BA, MA); Northwestern University (PhD)
- Influences: Karl Marx; Joseph Schumpeter; Robert Dahl; Jon Elster

Academic work
- Discipline: Political science
- Sub-discipline: Comparative politics
- School or tradition: September Group
- Institutions: Washington University in St. Louis; University of Chicago; New York University
- Doctoral students: Fernando Limongi, Stathis Kalyvas, Jack Knight
- Main interests: Democracy, Democratization, Capitalism

Adam Przeworski (Polish: [pʂɛˈvɔrskʲi]; born May 5, 1940) is a Polish-American professor of political science specializing in comparative politics. He is Carroll and Milton Petrie Professor Emeritus in the Department of Politics of New York University. He is a scholar of democratic societies, theory of democracy, social democracy and political economy, as well as an early proponent of rational choice theory in political science.

== Biography ==
He was born in 1940 in Warsaw, Poland when the country was occupied by Nazi Germany. His parents were physicians. His father, whom he never met, was conscripted in the Polish army in 1939 and killed in the 1940 Katyn massacre by Soviet troops.

His uncle Andrzej Przeworski was a Polish footballer, referee and manager. His wife is a former senior manager at the OECD and the UN and the founding director of the Bard Center for Environmental Policy. Their daughter Molly Przeworski is a population geneticist. Both Adam Przeworski and Molly were the first father-daughter members elected to the U.S. National Academy of Sciences. Przeworski was also elected to the British Academy. Przeworski is an ardent fan of the English football club Arsenal.

Przeworski graduated from University of Warsaw in 1961 with a MA in philosophy and sociology. In Warsaw, Przeworski met a Northwestern University political science professor, R. Barry Farrell. Farrell persuaded Przeworski to move to the United States to study political science. According to Przeworski, "I don’t remember if I had the smarts to ask him what political science was: I did not know what it was. But even if he had asked me if I wanted to work on a ship sailing around the world, I would have said ‘‘yes.’’ I was twenty years old, and I would have gone anywhere to do anything."

Przeworski received his Ph.D. in political science from Northwestern University in 1966. Thereafter, he taught at Washington University in St. Louis (1969–1973), the University of Chicago (1973–1995), and New York University (NYU) (1995–present). He is currently professor emeritus at NYU.

At the University of Chicago, he was awarded the title of Martin A. Ryerson Distinguished Service Professor. At NYU, he was Carroll and Milton Petrie Professor of Politics and (by courtesy) of Economics Emeritus. He also held visiting appointments in India, Chile, Great Britain, France, Germany, Spain (Juan March Institute), and Switzerland.

Przeworski joined the September Group of analytical Marxists in 1979 or 1980; he left the group in 1995.

== Academic research ==
Przeworski has published widely in a variety of fields. One of his early works, The Logic of Comparative Social Inquiry (1970), is "an important influence on methodological practices in comparative politics."

His two books in the 1980s, Capitalism and Social Democracy (1985) and the coauthored Paper Stones (1986), turned to the question of why leftist parties "abandon socialism and adopt instead a reformist agenda within the parameters of capitalism."

Thereafter he wrote several works on various aspects of democracy: Democracy and the Market (1991), Democracy and Development (2000), Democracy and the Limits of Self-Government (2010), Why Bother with Elections? (2018), and Crises of Democracy (2019). Among other things, in these works on democracy Przeworski has defended a minimalist conception of democracy in which "democracy is just a system in which rulers are selected by competitive elections."

Przeworski also published two broad overviews of theories of the state and political economy: The State and the Economy Under Capitalism (1990) and States and Markets (2003).

Two enduring concerns in Przeworski's research have been: (1) the compatibility of democracy and capitalism, and (2) the possibility of a democratic path to socialism. Przeworski acknowledged that an important influence on his thinking throughout his life has been the works of Karl Marx.

=== The Logic of Comparative Social Inquiry ===
In The Logic of Comparative Social Inquiry (1970), Przeworski and Teune introduced the idea of "most similar systems" and "most different systems" designs. This book also introduced a key distinction relevant in research on measurement: the distinction between "common indicators" and "system-specific indicators."

=== Capitalism and Social Democracy and Paper Stones ===
In Capitalism and Social Democracy (1985), and in the companion volume with John Sprague Paper Stones: A History of Electoral Socialism (1985), Przeworski argues that European socialist parties in the first half of the 20th century faced a sequence of electoral dilemmas. The first dilemma was whether or not to participate in bourgeois elections, when universal suffrage was progressively established in Europe. The question was whether or not participation would contribute to the struggle for socialism or strengthen the capitalist order. According to Przeworski, most socialist parties have opted to get involved in elections, since it was a means to advance some of the interests of workers in the short run and, as references to Friedrich Engels and Eduard Bernstein illustrate in Przeworski's book, to move toward socialism.

According to Przeworski, the decision to participate in bourgeois elections led to another dilemma. Given that manual workers were not the numerical majority in any European country, to win elections they had to choose whether or not to compromise their socialist principles and adopt a social democratic agenda to attract the support of allies, especially the middle class. Such compromise had major consequences for socialist parties, including the withdrawal of support of workers, the abandoning of extra-parliamentary tactics, and progressively the defection from socialist policies when in power.

Criticism to Przeworski's account of the dilemmas of social democratic parties have been at least twofold. First, it has been shown that numerical majority is not necessary for social democratic parties to control governments, which implies that social democratic parties do not necessarily need to sacrifice workers’ votes to win elections. Second, Gøsta Esping-Andersen argues that Przeworski is mistaken in attempting to differentiate reformist and revolutionary policies, since "we have no accepted criteria for deciding which actions will merely reflect the status quo and which will accelerate historical transformation." Esping-Andersen suggests that policies that leftist parties adopt should be compared based on how they aid the process of class unity.

=== Democracy and the Market ===
In Democracy and the Market (1991), Przeworski analyzes events in Eastern Europe and Latin America, focusing on transitions to democracy and market-oriented economic reforms. Przeworski presents a minimalist view of democracy: "Democracy is a system in which parties lose elections.". He analyzes transitions to democracy using rudimentary game theory, and he emphasizes the interdependence of political and economic transformations.

=== Democracy and Development ===
In Democracy and Development: Political Institutions and Well-Being in the World, 1950–1990 (2000), Przeworski provides a statistical analysis of the causes and consequences of democracy across the globe.

On the causes of democracy, Przeworski assesses Seymour Martin Lipset’s thesis about the impact of economic development on political regimes and finds that Lipset’s argument regarding the association between a high level of economic development and the stability of democracy is supported. However, Przeworski "challenged the view that increases in the level of development are associated with increased prospects of transitions to democracy."

On the consequences of democracy, Przeworski argued, against authors such as Samuel P. Huntington, that "democracies perform as well economically as do authoritarian regimes."

=== Democracy and the Limits of Self-Government ===
This book is Przeworski's most extended discussion of the ideal of democracy and how much of this ideal can realistically be attained.

The book takes as its point of department that democracy is a set of institutions that must meet four "conditions":

1. Equality, the ability of every citizen to have the same influence on collective decisions
2. Participation, the ability of every citizen to have an effective influence on collective decisions
3. Representation, the implementation of collective decisions by elected representatives
4. Liberty, the respect for individual freedom unimpeded by the state

This way of thinking about democracy is somewhat of a departure for Przeworski, who has been known as a defender of a minimalist conception of democracy. One reviewer argues that in this book Przeworski has gone beyond the standard minimalist conception of democracy associated with Joseph Schumpeter.

Thereafter, Przeworski explores the extent to which these conditions can be met and hence what limits are faced by the ideal of democracy. Przeworski argues that democracy has historically faced four challenges: "(1) the incapacity to generate equality in the socioeconomic realm, (2) the incapacity to make people feel that their political participation is effective, (3) the incapacity to ensure that governments do what they are supposed to do and not do what they are not mandated to do, and (4) the incapacity to balance order and noninterference."

Throughout the book, Przeworski offers a sober assessment of the potential of democracy to revert these challenges. One of his central arguments is that, counter to the hope of many, "democracy does not generate more economic equality." However, he cautions that, even though "democracy faces limits to the extent of possible economic equality, effective participation, perfect agency, and liberty", it is important to recognize these limits so as to better elucidate "directions for reforms that are feasible" and "not to criticize democracy for not achieving what no political arrangement can achieve."

=== Why Bother with Elections? ===
In this 2018 book, Adam Przeworski addresses a classic question, why should democracy be valued?

Przeworski considers that democracy is a "method of processing conflicts." He poses the question in the following terms: “Are there good reasons to think that if rulers are selected through contested elections their decisions will be rational, that governments will be representative, the economy will perform well, the distribution of income will be egalitarian, and people will live in liberty and peace?" And he concludes that the strongest rationale for supporting democracy is that it generates civil peace.

His reasoning is worth quoting at length. Przeworski holds that “In the end, the miracle of democracy is that conflicting political forces obey the results of voting. People who have guns obey those without them. Incumbents risk their control of governmental offices by holding elections. Losers wait for their chance to win office. Conflicts are regulated, processed according to rules, and thus limited. This is not consensus, yet not mayhem either. Just regulated conflict; conflict without killing. Ballots are “paper stones.”

=== Crises of Democracy ===
Przeworski's Crises of Democracy (2019) analyzes the threats to democracy in the twenty-first century in established democracies and argues that the problems are not just of a political nature. He holds that the problems have deep economic, social, and cultural roots.

== Major works ==
- Przeworski, Adam, and Henry Teune. 1970. The Logic of Comparative Social Inquiry. New York: Wiley.
- Cortés, Fernando, Adam Przeworski, and John Sprague. 1974. Systems Analysis for Social Scientists. New York: John Wiley & Sons.
- Przeworski, Adam. 1975. “Institutionalization of Voting Patterns, or is Mobilization the Source of Decay.” American Political Science Review 69(1): 49–67.
- Przeworski, Adam, and Michael Wallerstein. 1982. “The Structure of Class Conflict in Democratic Capitalist Societies.” American Political Science Review 76(2): 215–238.
- Przeworski, Adam. 1985. Capitalism and Social Democracy. Cambridge: Cambridge University Press.
- Przeworski, Adam, and John Sprague. 1986. Paper Stones: A History of Electoral Socialism. Chicago: University of Chicago Press.
- Przeworski, Adam. 1986. “Some Problems in the Study of the Transition to Democracy,” pp. 47–63, in Guillermo O’Donnell, Philippe Schmitter, and Laurence Whitehead (eds.), Transitions from Authoritarian Rule. Comparative Perspectives. Baltimore, MD: The Johns Hopkins University Press.
- Przeworski, Adam, and Michael Wallerstein. 1988. "Structural Dependence of the State on Capital." American Political Science Review 82(1): 11–29.
- Przeworski, Adam. 1990. The State and the Economy Under Capitalism. New York: Harwood Academic Publishers.
- Przeworski, Adam. 1991. Democracy and the Market: Political and Economic Reforms in Eastern Europe and Latin America. Cambridge: Cambridge University Press.
- Luiz Carlos Bresser Pereira, José María Maravall, and Adam Przeworski (eds.). 1993. Economic Reforms in New Democracies: A Social-Democratic Approach. Cambridge: Cambridge University Press.
- Przeworski, Adam, and Fernando Limongi. 1993. "Political Regimes and Economic Growth." Journal of Economic Perspectives 7(3): 51–69.
- Przeworski, Adam, et al. 1995. Sustainable Democracy. New York: Cambridge University Press.
- Przeworski, Adam, and Fernando Limongi. 1997. "Modernization: Theories and Facts." World Politics 49(2): 155–183.
- Przeworski, Adam, Susan C. Stokes and Bernard Manin (eds.) 1999. Democracy, Accountability and. Representation. Cambridge: Cambridge University Press.
- Przeworski, Adam. 1999. “Minimalist Conception of Democracy: A Defense,” pp. 23–55, in Ian Shapiro and Casiano Hacker-Cordón (eds.), Democracy’s Value. New York, NY: Cambridge University Press.
- Przeworski, Adam, with Michael E. Alvarez, Jose Antonio Cheibub, and Fernando Limongi. 2000. Democracy and Development: Political Institutions and Well-Being in the World, 1950–1990. Cambridge: Cambridge University Press.
- Przeworski, Adam, and José María Maravall (eds.) 2003. Democracy and the Rule of Law. Cambridge: Cambridge University Press.
- Przeworski, Adam. 2003. States and Markets: A Primer in Political Economy. Cambridge: Cambridge University Press.
- Jennifer Gandhi and Adam Przeworski. 2007. "Authoritarian Institutions and the Survival of Autocrats." Comparative Political Studies 40(11): 1279–1301.
- Przeworski, Adam. 2009. “Conquered or Granted? A History of Franchise Extensions.” British Journal of Political Science 39(2): 291–321.
- Przeworski, Adam. 2010. Democracy and the Limits of Self-Government. Cambridge: Cambridge University Press.
- Przeworski, Adam. 2018. Why Bother with Elections? London: Polity Press.
- Przeworski, Adam. 2019. Crises of Democracy. Cambridge: Cambridge University Press.

== Non-academic writings ==
External videos
- Presentation by Przeworski on Karl Marx, Part 1 and Presentation by Przeworski on Karl Marx, Part 2 – at the Universidad Torcuato Di Tella, in 2008 (in Spanish).
- Presentation by Przeworski on democracy – at the 2nd Congreso Internacional de Ciencia Política, in Toluca, México, Sept. 11–13, 2014 (in Spanish).
- Presentation by Przeworski on democracy – at the ERF 21st Annual Conference, in Tunisia, March 20, 2015.
- Radio interview with Przeworski on democracy – in Uruguay, Nov. 27, 2015 (in Spanish).
- Przeworski interview with Luis Tonelli – at the University of Buenos Aires, in 2020 (in Spanish).
- Przeworski webinar on Crises of Democracy – on June 23, 2021.
- Conferencia Magistral Estacional de Primavera 2023 “Declive y Erosión de la Democracia” – on March 23, 2023 (in Spanish).
- Przeworski presentation on The Future of Social Democracy – on June 8, 2023.

In February 2025, Przeworski began documenting his thoughts and reaction to the second Trump administration as a diary on Substack.

- Przeworski, Adam. 1992. "The Neoliberal Fallacy." Journal of Democracy 3(3): 45–59. Project MUSE - The Neoliberal Fallacy
- Przeworski, Adam. 2020. "Life in the Time of COVID-19." Concilium Civitas March 19, 2020. Concilium Civitas Almanac 2020/2021 – Professor Adam Przeworski “Life in the Time of COVID-19” – Concilium Civitas
- Przeworski, Adam. 2021. "From Revolution to Reformism." Boston Review Jan. 28, 2021. From Revolution to Reformism
- Przeworski, Adam. 2024. "Who Decides What Is Democratic?" Journal of Democracy 35(3): 5–16.

== Resources on Przeworski and his research ==
- Burawoy, Michael. 1989. “Marxism without Micro-Foundations.” Socialist Review 19: 53–86.
- Higgins, Winton, and Nixon Apple. 1983. "How Limited Is Reformism?: A Critique of Przeworski and Panitch." Theory and Society 12,5: 603–630.
- Kitschelt, Herbert. 1993. “Comparative Historical Research and Rational Choice Theory: The Case of Transitions to Democracy.” Theory and Society 22(3): 413–427. [Review of Przeworski's 1991 Democracy and the Market.]
- Munck, Gerardo L., and Richard Snyder. 2007. "Adam Przeworski: Capitalism, Democracy, and Science,” pp. 456–503, in Gerardo L. Munck and Richard Snyder, Passion, Craft, and Method in Comparative Politics. Baltimore, Md.: The Johns Hopkins University Press. [Interview with Adam Przeworski]
- Munck, Gerardo L. 2011. “Democratic Theory After Transitions From Authoritarian Rule,” Perspectives on Politics 9(2): 333–343.
- Przeworski, Adam. 2016. "Democracy: A Never-Ending Quest." Annual Review of Political Science Vol. 19: 1–12. Democracy: A Never-Ending Quest
- Przeworski, Adam. 2021. “What Have I Learned from Marx and What Still Stands? Politics & Society 49(4): 433–450

== Awards and honors ==
Przeworski has been the recipient of many awards.

- 1991 Member of the American Academy of Arts and Sciences.
- 1998 Gregory M. Luebbert Article Award.
- 2001 Woodrow Wilson Prize of the American Political Science Association (APSA) for the book Democracy and Development.
- 2002 Best data set, from the Comparative Politics Section of the American Political Science Association (APSA)
- 2010 The Johan Skytte Prize in Political Science for "raising the scientific standards regarding the analysis of the relations between democracy, capitalism and economic development."
- 2018 Juan Linz Prize of the International Political Science Association (IPSA)
- 2021 Elected member of the U. S. National Academy of Sciences.
- 2021 Elected as "corresponding fellow" of the British Academy.

Other awards include the 1985 Socialist Review Book Award, Honorary Professor of Chongqing University 2012, a Doctor Honoris Causa by the Universidad Nacional de Tucuman 2016, the Sakip Sabanci International Research Awards’ Jury Prize in 2018, and the 2020 Lawrence Longley Article Award.

The Lijphart/Przeworski/Verba Dataset Award of the Comparative Politics sections of the American Political Science Association (APSA) is named for Przeworski and two other distinguished political scientists. The award recognizes the best publicly accessible data set which benefits the research community as a whole.

== See also ==
- Democratization – Society becoming more democratic
- Economic development – Process and policies to improve economic well-being
- Democracy-Dictatorship Index – Binary measure of democracy and dictatorship
- Juan Linz – Spanish sociologist and political scientist (1926–2013)
- Guillermo O'Donnell – Argentine political scientist (1936–2011)
- Philippe C. Schmitter – American political scientist (born 1936)
