= Jack Knight (political scientist) =

Jack Knight (born July 13, 1952) is a political scientist and political and legal theorist. His scholarly work focuses on modern social and political theory, law and legal theory, and political economy. He is currently a professor of law, politics, philosophy and economics at Duke University School of Law and at the Duke's Trinity College of Arts and Sciences. He is the author of several books such as Institutions and Social Conflict (Cambridge University Press, 1992), Explaining Social Institutions (The University of Michigan Press, 1995), and The Choices Justices Make (Congressional Quarterly Press, 1997), with which he won the American Political Science Association C. Herman Prichett Award.

He has also written many journal articles and edited volumes about democratic theory, rules of law, judicial decision-making, and theories of institutional emergence and change. He has collaborated as a professor and researcher in universities at Washington, Chicago, Michigan, Virginia, Copenhagen, NYU, and Bonn.

Knight holds a bachelor's degree and JD from the University of North Carolina at Chapel Hill and a MA and a Ph.D. in political science from the University of Chicago. Knight is a member of the American Academy of Arts and Sciences.
