= Andrzej Przeworski =

Polish footballer, referee, and manager

Personal information
- Full name: Andrzej Przeworski
- Date of birth: 11 February 1900
- Place of birth: Kraków, Austria-Hungary
- Date of death: 24 November 1952 (aged 52)
- Place of death: Warsaw, Poland
- Position: Goalkeeper

Senior career*
Years	Team	Apps	(Gls)
1914–1920	Cracovia		
1920–1922	Polonia Warsaw		
1922–1926	Cracovia		

International career
1922	Poland	1	(0)

Managerial career
- 1931: Poland
- 1935: Poland
- 1937: Poland
- * Club domestic league appearances and goals

Andrzej Przeworski (11 February 1900 – 24 November 1952) was a Polish footballer, referee and manager. A goalkeeper, he played for Cracovia (1914–1920, 1922–1926), Polonia Warsaw (1920–1922), and Legia Warsawa Old Boys (1928).

His debut and only match for the national team came on 3 September 1922 in a 1–1 draw to Romania.

He served as manager for the Polish football team for a brief period from September 1947 to October of the following year.

== Family ==
Przeworski's nephew Adam Przeworski is a professor of Political Science at New York University.

== Bibliography ==
- Gowarzewski, Andrzej (1991). Encyklopedia piłkarska FUJI. 2 (in Polish). Katowice: GiA. p. 81. ISBN 83-900277-1-2.
