= Sociology of race and ethnic relations =

Field of study

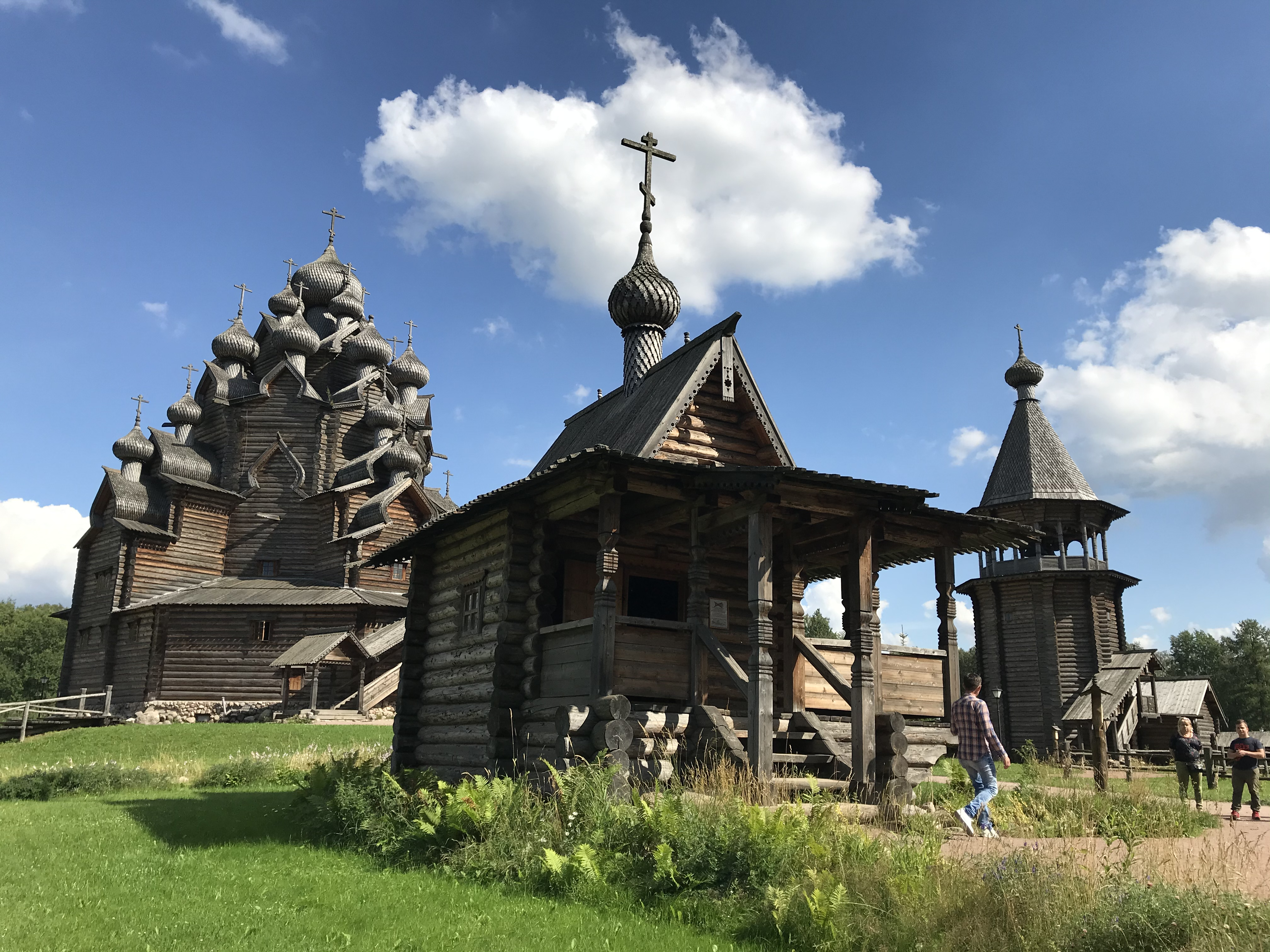
Bogoslovka ethnic theme park. Vsevolozhsky District, Russia

The sociology of race and ethnic relations is the study of social, political, and economic relations between races and ethnicities at all levels of society. This area encompasses the study of systemic racism, like residential segregation and other complex social processes between different racial and ethnic groups, as well as theories that encompass these social processes

The sociological analysis of race and ethnicity frequently interacts with postcolonial theory and other areas of sociology such as stratification and social psychology. At the level of political policy, ethnic relations is discussed in terms of either assimilationism or multiculturalism. Anti-racism forms another style of policy, particularly popular in the 1960s and 1970s. At the level of academic inquiry, ethnic relations is discussed either by the experiences of individual racial-ethnic groups or else by overarching theoretical issues.

== Identity ==
In the study of the sociology of race and ethnic relations, two key concepts are race and ethnicity. Although these terms are often used interchangeably in everyday language, they have distinct meanings within sociological discourse.

Race is defined as a social construction that characterizes people based on physical traits such as skin color, facial features, and hair textures. Sociologists reject the notion that race is a biological fact and emphasize the construction of race through what society deems to be significant. It is shaped and upheld by historical, political, and economic contexts.

Ethnicity pertains to shared cultural traits, practices, and a collective identity tied to a specific group. Ethnic identity involve elements like language, religion, traditions, and a sense of belonging.

The term ethnoracial group can specify ethnic communities whose identity is defined, at least in part, by race.

== Classical theorists ==
=== W.E.B. Du Bois ===
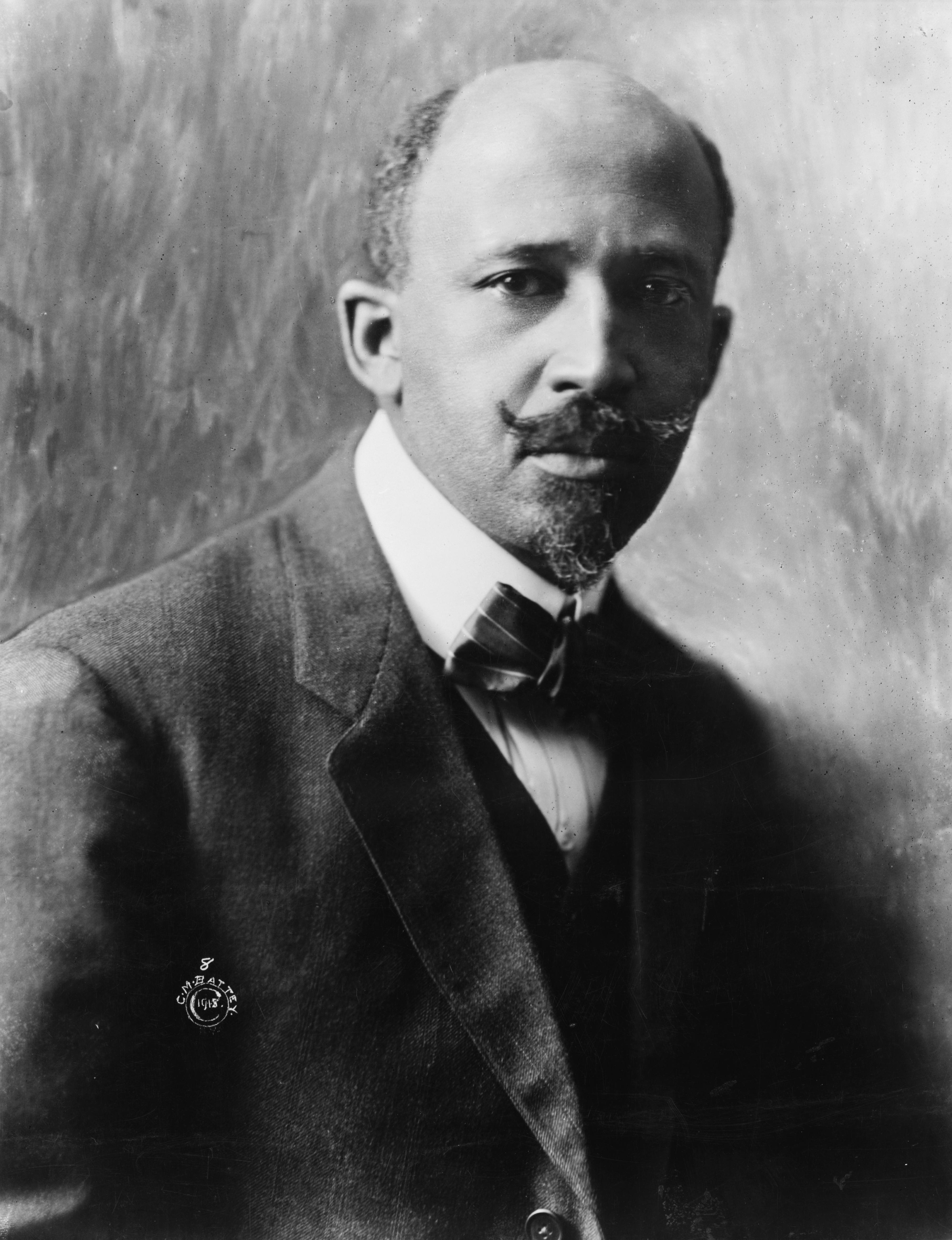
W. E. B. Du Bois in 1918

W.E.B. Du Bois was an African American scholar and activist in the 20th century. Du Bois educated himself about black people, and sought academia as a way to enlighten others on the social injustices against blacks. Du Bois' research "revealed the Negro group as a symptom, not a cause; as a striving, palpitating group, and not an inert, sick body of crime; as a long historic development and not a transient occurrence". Du Bois believed that Black Americans should embrace higher education and use their new access to schooling to achieve a higher position within society. He referred to this idea as the Talented Tenth. With gaining popularity, he also promoted the belief that in order for blacks to be free in some places, they must be free everywhere. After traveling to Africa and Russia, he recanted his original philosophy of integration and acknowledged it as a long-term vision.

=== Marx ===
The ideas of Marx have contributed widely to the study of sociology and conflict theory. Marx described society as having nine "great" classes, the capitalist class and the working class, with the middle classes falling in behind one or the other as they see fit. He hoped for the working class to rise up against the capitalist class in an attempt to stop the exploitation of the working class. He blamed part of their failure to organize on the capitalist class, as they separated black and white laborers. This separation, specifically between Blacks and Whites in America, contributed to racism. Marx attributes capitalism's contribution to racism through segmented labor markets and a racial inequality of earnings.

=== Booker T. Washington ===
Booker T. Washington was a noted black educator born in 1856 as a slave in Virginia. Washington came of age as slavery was coming to an end, and was replaced by a system of sharecropping in the southern United States that resulted in black indebtedness. With growing discrimination in the South following the end of the Reconstruction era, Washington felt that the key to advancing in America rested with getting an education and improving one's economic well-being, not with political advancement. Consequently, in 1881, he founded the Tuskegee Institute, now Tuskegee University, in order to provide individuals with an education that would help them to find employment in the growing industrial sector. By focusing on education for blacks, rather than political advancement, he gained financial support from whites for his cause. Secretly, however, he pursued legal challenges against segregation and disfranchisement of blacks.

=== Weber ===
Max Weber laid the foundations for a micro-sociology of ethnic relations beginning in 1906. Weber argued that biological traits could not be the basis for group foundation, unless they were conceived as shared characteristics. It was this shared perception and common customs that create and distinguish one ethnicity from another. This differs from the views of many of his contemporaries, who believed that an ethnic group was formed from biological similarities alone apart from social perception of membership in a group.

== Modern theorists ==
=== Eduardo Bonilla-Silva ===
Eduardo Bonilla-Silva is currently a professor of sociology at Duke University and is the 2018 president of the American Sociological Association. He received his PhD in 1993 from University of Wisconsin–Madison, which is where he met his mentor, Charles Camic, of which he said "Camic believed in me and told me, just before graduation, that I should stay in the states as I would contribute greatly to American sociology." Bonilla-Silva did not start off his work as a "race scholar," but originally was trained in class analysis, political sociology, and sociology of development (globalization). It was not until the late 1980s when he joined a student movement calling for racial justice at the University of Wisconsin that he began his work in race. In his book, Racism without Racists, Bonilla-Silva discusses less overt racism, which he refers to as "new racism," which disguises itself "under the cloak of legality" in order to accomplish the same things. He also discusses "color-blind racism," which is essentially when people go off the basis that we have achieved equality and deny past and present discriminations.

=== Patricia Hill Collins ===
Patricia Hill Collins is currently a Distinguished University Professor Emerita at the University of Maryland, College Park. She received her PhD in sociology in 1984 from Brandeis University. Collins was the president-elect for the American Sociological Association, where she was the 100th president and the first African-American woman to be president of the organization. Collins is a social theorist whose work and research primarily focuses on race, social class, sexuality, and gender. She has written a number of books and articles on said topics. Collins work focuses on Intersectionality, by looking at issues through the lens of women of color. In her work, she writes "First, we need new visions of what oppression is, new categories of analysis that are inclusive of race, class, and gender as distinctive yet interlocking structures of oppression".

=== Denise Ferreira da Silva ===
Denise Ferreira da Silva is a trained sociologist and critical philosopher of race. She is a professor and director of The Social Justice Institute (the Institute for Gender, Race, Sexuality, and Social Justice) at the University of British Columbia. Before joining UBC, she was an associate professor of ethnic studies, at the University of California, San Diego. Da Silva's major monograph, Toward a Global Idea of Race, traces the history of modern philosophical thought from Descartes to Herder in order to reconstruct the emergence of the racial as an historical and scientific concept. This sociology of race relations for Da Silva locates the mind as the principle site of the development of the racial and cultural which emerge as the global (exterior-spatial) in the contemporary context.

== Discipline development by country ==
=== United States ===
In the United States, the study of racial and ethnic relations has been widely influenced by the factors associated with each major wave of immigration as the incoming group struggles with keeping its own cultural and ethnic identity while also assimilating into the broader mainstream American culture and economy. One of the first and most prevalent topics within American study is of the relations between white Americans and African Americans due to the heavy collective memory and culture borne out of, and lingering from, centuries of forced slavery in plantations.

Throughout the rest of American history, each new wave of immigration to the United States has brought another set of issues as the tension between maintaining diversity and assimilating takes on new shapes. Racism and conflict often rears up during these times. However, some key currents can be gleaned from this body of knowledge: in the context of the United States, there is a tendency for minorities to be punished in times of economic, political and/or geopolitical crises. Times of social and systemic stability, however, tend to mute whatever underlying tensions exist between different groups. In times of societal crisis—whether perceived or real—patterns or retractability of American identities have erupted to the fore of America's political landscape. Examples can be seen in Executive Order 9066 that placed Japanese Americans in incarceration centers as well as the 19th century Chinese Exclusion Act that banned Chinese laborers from emigrating to the United States (local workers viewed Chinese laborers as a threat). Current examples include post-9/11 backlash against Muslim Americans, although these have taken place in civil society, not through public policy.

An aspect of racial and ethnic relations that is heavily studied is the sociological implications that come with racism and the associated poverty. It is a very divisive issue in the United States as it contributes to the belief that the United States is not equal and united. The continued denial of important issues and exclusion of minority concerns have led to violent upheaval to draw awareness to the civil strife. This results in the police and government resorting order, but at the expense of alienating and brutalizing minority populations. In addition, the majority populations are also alienated from minorities through the use of violence.

=== United Kingdom ===
The demography of ethnic population in Britain are shaped by their imperial history. In the United Kingdom, foreign nationals were actively encouraged and sponsored to migrate in the 1950s after the dissolution of the Empire and the social devastation of the Second World War. The 1962 Commonwealth Immigrants Act changed the law so that only certain British Commonwealth members were able to migrate. This law was tightened again with the Commonwealth Immigrants Act 1968 and Immigration Act 1971. The Race Relations Act 1968 extended certain anti-discrimination policies with respect to employment, housing, commercial and other services. This was extended again with the Race Relations Act 1976.

The Race Relations Amendment Act 2000 was made to promote anti-discriminatory policies concerning the ingrained nature of systemic racial and ethnic inequality in the country, which shows the UK government develops policies that address racial inequalities and hate crimes. In 2018, the United Nations Special Rapporteur analyzed the state of racial intolerance. They assessed that the state of the country was still rooted in socio-economic exclusion of minorities. The UK still has inequalities in many institutions such as housing, employment, health, and more. This means that race continues to determines people's standards of living. In addition, there is the political climate in the UK is becoming increasingly tense, with things such as the government's immigration policy. The negative impact of an antagonistic environment on minority groups is noted with an increase in hate speech and violence.

As with the UK establishments of media and cultural studies, 'ethnic relations' is often taught as a loosely distinct discipline either within sociology departments or other schools of humanities.

Major British theorists include Paul Gilroy, Stuart Hall, Richard Jenkins, John Rex, Michael Banton and Tariq Modood.

== Social psychology ==
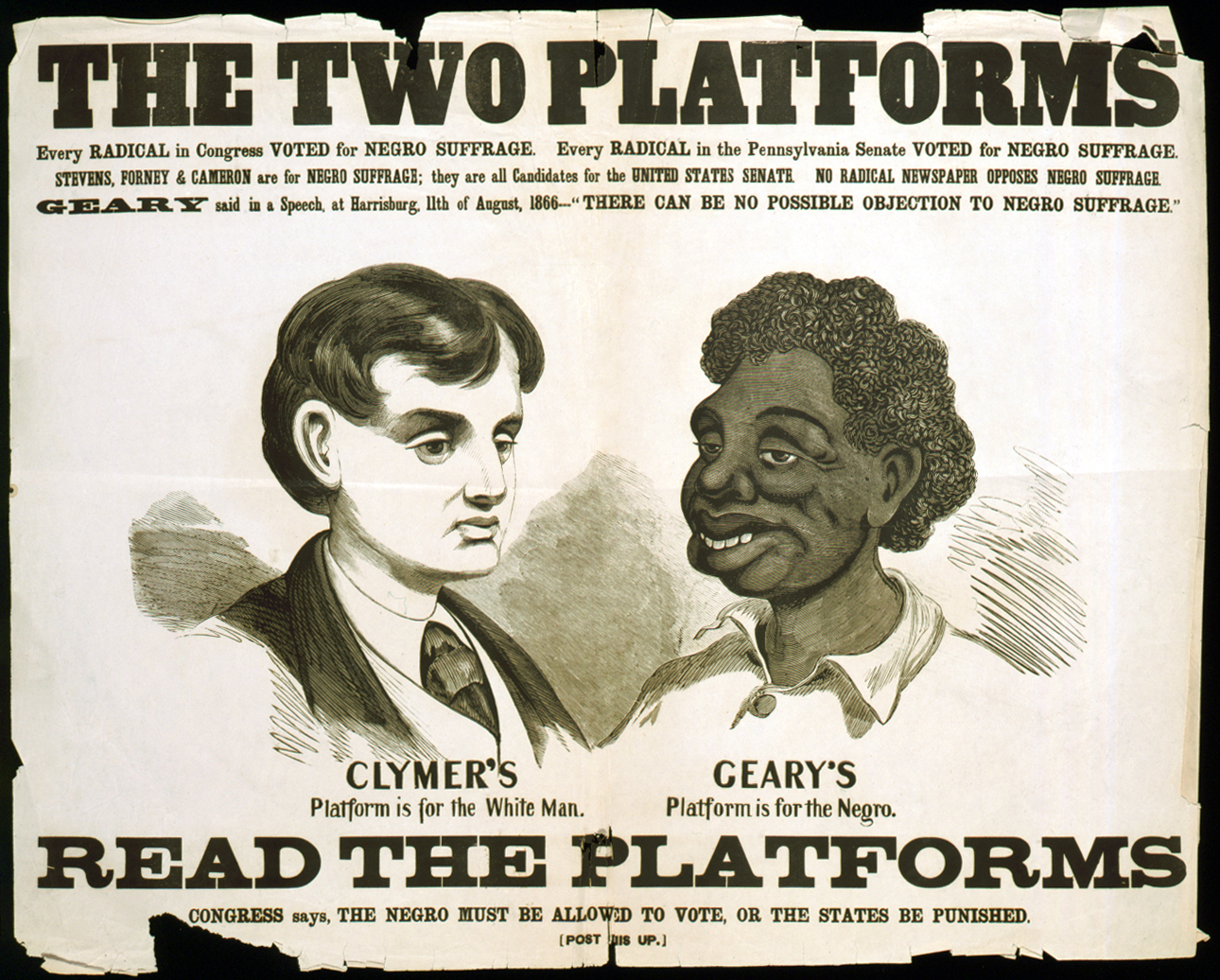
A racist political campaign poster from the 1866 Pennsylvania gubernatorial election

Social psychology and the sociology of race and ethnic relations are interconnected fields that explore how race and ethnicity shape individuals’ behaviors, attitudes, and social interactions. While both disciplines share an interest in understanding the dynamics of race and ethnicity, they approach the topic from different perspectives. Findings from both fields, however, complement each other in revealing the complex ways race and ethnicity influence both individual and collective experiences.

One of the most important social psychological findings concerning race relations is that members of stereotyped groups internalize those stereotypes and thus suffer a wide range of harmful consequences. For example, in a phenomenon called stereotype threat, members of racial and ethnic groups that are stereotyped to scoring poorly on tests will perform poorer on those tests, if they are reminded of this stereotype. The effect is so strong that even simply asking the test-taker to state her or his race before taking the test (such is by bubbling in "African American" on a multiple choice question) will significantly alter test performance. A specifically sociological contribution to this line of research has found that such negative stereotypes can be created on the spot: an experiment by Michael Lovaglia et al.(1998) demonstrated that left-handed people can be made to suffer stereotype threat if they are led to believe that they are a disadvantaged group for a particular kind of test. However, arguments that stereotype threat suffers from publication bias have been made.

== Audit studies ==
Another important line of research on race takes the form of audit studies. The audit study approach creates an artificial pool of people among whom there are no average differences by race. For instance, groups of white and black auditors are matched on every category other than their race, and thoroughly trained to act in identical ways. Given nearly identical resumes, they are sent to interview for the same jobs. Simple comparisons of means can yield strong evidence regarding discrimination. The best known audit study in sociology is The Mark of a Criminal Record by Harvard University sociologist Devah Pager. This study compares job prospects of black and white men who were recently released from jail. Its key finding is that blacks are significantly discriminated against when applying for service jobs. Moreover, whites with a criminal record have about the same prospect of getting an interview as blacks without one. Another recent audit by UCLA sociologist S. Michael Gaddis examines the job prospects of black and white college graduates from elite private and high quality state higher education institutions. This research finds that black people who graduate from an elite school such as Harvard have about the same prospect of getting an interview as white people who graduate from a state school such as UMass Amherst.

== See also ==
- Bibliography of sociology § Race and ethnicity
- Black feminism
- European Commission against Racism and Intolerance
- Social cohesion
- Sociology of immigration
- Strategic essentialism
- Sundanese–Balinese relations
