= Erik Olin Wright =

American sociologist (1947 – 2019)

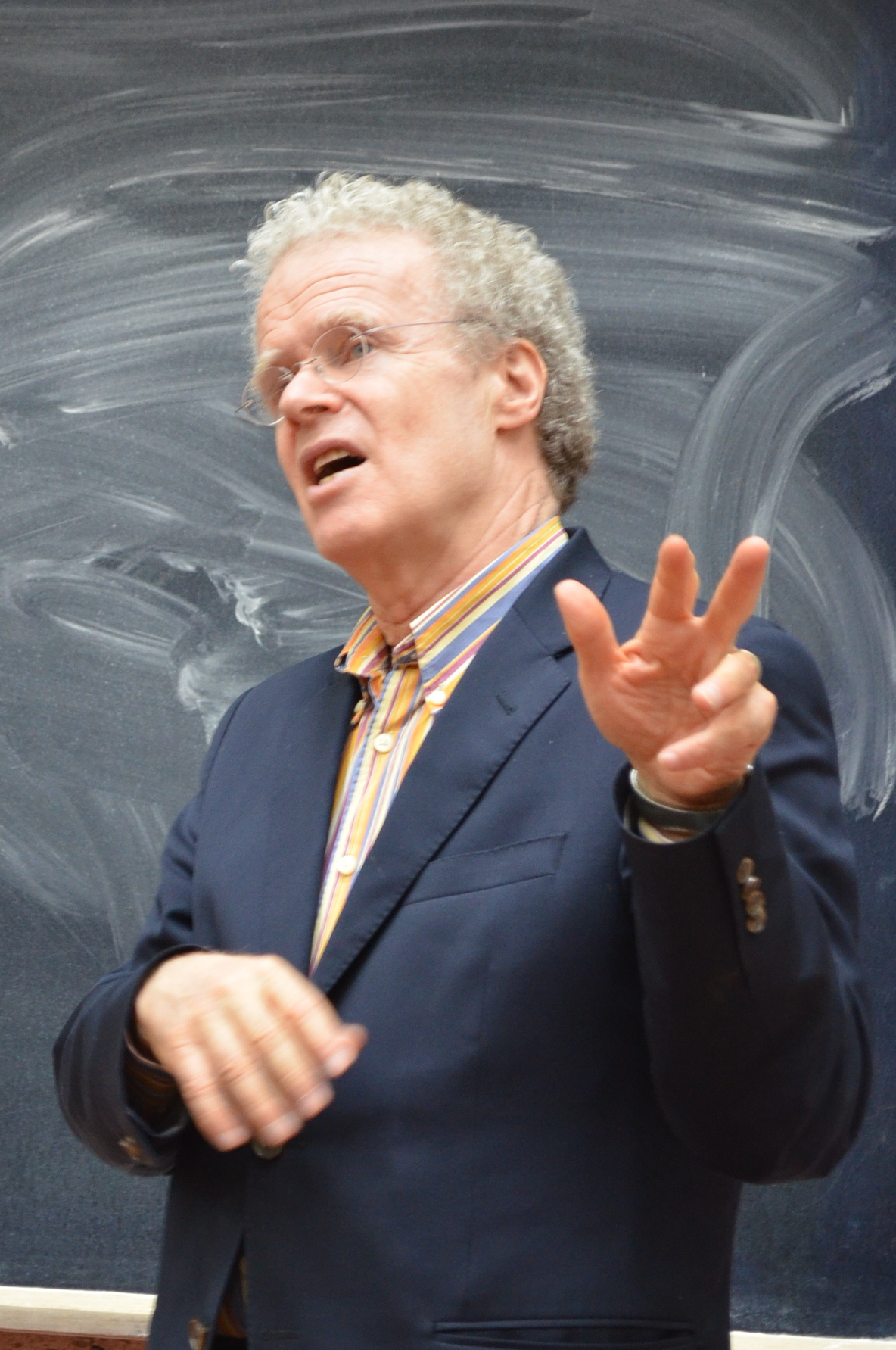
- Wright lecturing at Kyiv University in 2013
- Born: February 9, 1947; Berkeley, California, U.S.
- Died: January 23, 2019 (aged 71); Milwaukee, Wisconsin, U.S.
- Spouse: Marcia Kahn Wright (m. 1971)

Academic background
- Education: Harvard University (BA); Balliol College, Oxford (BA); University of California, Berkeley (PhD)
- Thesis: Class Structure and Income Inequality (1976)
- Doctoral advisor: Arthur Stinchcombe
- Other advisor: Michael Reich
- Influences: Karl Marx; John Roemer

Academic work
- Discipline: Sociology
- School or tradition: Analytical Marxism
- Institutions: University of Wisconsin–Madison (1976–2019)
- Doctoral students: Julia Adams; Vivek Chibber; Wilmot James; César Rodríguez Garavito; Karen Shire; George Steinmetz; Andrew Szasz; Matt Vidal; Josh Whitford
- Notable students: Eduardo Bonilla-Silva; Gøsta Esping-Andersen; Lane Kenworthy; Shamus Khan; Devah Pager
- Main interests: Marxist class analysis
- Notable ideas: Contradictory class location; real utopian sociology; Theory of historical trajectory

Erik Olin Wright (February 9, 1947 – January 23, 2019) was an American analytical Marxist sociologist at the University of Wisconsin–Madison, specializing in social stratification and in egalitarian alternative futures to capitalism. He was known for diverging from classical Marxism in his breakdown of the working class into subgroups of diversely held power and therefore varying degrees of class consciousness. Wright introduced novel concepts to adapt to this change of perspective including deep democracy and interstitial revolution.

== Early life and education ==
Born on February 9, 1947, in Berkeley, California, Wright was raised in Lawrence, Kansas. His parents, M. Erik Wright and Beatrice Ann (Posner) Wright, were both psychology professors at the University of Kansas. He received two Bachelor of Arts degrees, the first with a social studies major at Harvard College in 1968 and the second with a history major at Balliol College, University of Oxford, in 1970. Wright completed a Ph.D. in sociology at the University of California, Berkeley in 1976 and joined the Department of Sociology at University of Wisconsin–Madison the same year.

== Career ==
Wright began making contributions to the intellectual community in the mid-1970s, along with a whole generation of young academics who were radicalized by the Vietnam War and the civil rights movement.

At the University of Wisconsin–Madison, Wright supervised the dissertations of numerous young scholars who proceeded to become notable sociologists and politicians, among whom are included Wilmot James, César Rodríguez Garavito, and Vivek Chibber. Wright also served on the dissertation committees of scholars who go on to make considerable contributions to the fields of social stratification, social policy, and inequality including Gøsta Esping-Andersen, former American Sociological Association president Eduardo Bonilla-Silva, and the late Devah Pager. His students and advisees' include George Steinmetz, Julia Adams, Andrew Szasz, Wilmot James, David Hachen, Robin Stryker, Ivan Evans, Kwang-Yoeng Shin, Heidi Gottfried, Dorothy Watson, Ran Greenstein, Donmoon Cho, Lisa Brush, Raka Ray, Maureen Dolan, Richard Anderson-Connolly, Stephanie Luce, Vivek Chibber, Stuart Eimer, Gianpaolo Baiocchi, Devah Page, Meera Seghal, Greta Krippner, Josh Whitford, Rachel Dwyer, Liba Brent, Robert Mackin, Erin Hatton, Matt Vidal, Cesar Rodriguez, Matt Dimmick, Rodolfo Elbert, Masoud Movahed and David Calnitsky.

Throughout Wright's career, he was solicited by other universities to join their sociology faculty. One notable such recruitment attempt occurred at Harvard University in 1981. Among Wright's supporters were Harrison White, who respected Wright's work despite opposition to Wright's Marxist political commitments. Wright's opponents at Harvard included Daniel Bell and George Homans, as well as university president Derek Bok who purportedly blocked the department's attempt to recruit Wright. Harvard's attempt to recruit Wright coincided with its decision to deny tenure in 1981 to Theda Skocpol, a decision that was later reversed following controversy over accusations of gender discrimination.

In 2012, Wright was elected President of the American Sociological Association.

== Personal life ==
Wright was also an avid fiddle player, often encouraging guests to square dance at parties.

Wright died on January 23, 2019, from acute myeloid leukemia at a hospital in Milwaukee, Wisconsin, aged 71.

== Thought ==
=== Social classes ===
Wright has been described as an "influential new left theorist". His work was concerned mainly with the study of social classes, and in particular with the task of providing an update to and elaboration of the Marxist concept of class, in order to enable Marxist and non-Marxist researchers alike to use "class" to explain and predict people's material interests, lived experiences, living conditions, incomes, organizational capacities and willingness to engage in collective action, political leanings, and so on. In addition, he attempted to develop class categories that would allow researchers to compare and contrast the class structures and dynamics of different advanced capitalist and "post-capitalist" societies.

Wright has stressed the importance of:

1. control over and exclusion from access to economic/productive resources;
2. location within production relations;
3. market capacity in exchange relations;
4. differential control over income derived from the use of productive resources; and,
5. differential control over labor effort in defining "class", while at the same time trying to account for the situation of expert, skilled, manager, and supervisory employees, taking inspiration from Weberian accounts of class and class analysis.

According to Wright, employees with sought-after and reward-inelastically supplied skills (due to natural scarcities or socially constructed and imposed restrictions on supply, such as licensing, barriers to entry into training programs, etc.) are in a "privileged [surplus] appropriation location within exploitation relations" because, while they are not capitalists, they are able to obtain more privileges through their relation to the owner of the means of production than less skilled workers and harder to monitor and evaluate in terms of labor effort. The owner(s) of the means of production or their employer in general therefore has to pay them a "scarcity" or "skill/credential" rent (thus raising their compensation above the actual cost of producing and reproducing their labor power) and tries to "buy" their loyalty by giving them ownership stakes, endowing them with delegated authority over their fellow workers and/or allowing them to more or less be autonomous in determining the pace and direction of their work. Thus, experts, managers of experts, and executive managers tend to be closer to the interests of the employers than to other workers.

Wright's books include Class Counts: Comparative Studies in Class Analysis (Cambridge, 1997), which uses data collected in various industrialized countries, including the United States, Canada, Norway, and Sweden. He was a professor of sociology at the University of Wisconsin–Madison until his death.

=== Real utopias ===
Later in his career, Wright was associated with a renewed understanding of a socialist alternative, deeply rooted on social associative democracy. The transition to this alternative, according to Wright, depends on designing and building "real utopias", the name of a research project and book of his. They'd counter prevailing institutions by advancing democratic and egalitarian principles, thereby pointing in the direction of a more just and humane world. Examples include Wikipedia and the Mondragon Corporation. In his 2010 book Envisioning Real Utopias, Wright wrote an extensive case study about Wikipedia as an example of a social economy activity.

== Bibliography ==
=== Books ===
- Wright, Erik Olin (1973). The politics of punishment: a critical analysis of prisons in America. New York: Harper & Row. ISBN 978-0-06-090318-3.
- Wright, Erik Olin (1978). Class, crisis, and the state. London: New Left Books. ISBN 978-0-902308-93-0.
- Wright, Erik Olin (1979). Class structure and income determination. New York: Academic Press. ISBN 978-0-12-764950-4.
- Wright, Erik Olin (1997) [1985 Verso]. Classes. London New York: Verso. ISBN 978-1-85984-179-2.
- Wright, Erik Olin (1989). The debate on classes. London New York: Verso. ISBN 978-0-86091-966-7.
- Wright, Erik Olin (1994). Interrogating Inequality: essays on class analysis, socialism, and Marxism. London: Verso. ISBN 978-0860916338.
- Wright, Erik Olin (1997). Class counts: comparative studies in class analysis. Cambridge New York Paris: Cambridge University Press Maison des Sciences de l'homme. ISBN 978-0-521-55646-0.
- Wright, Erik (2010). Envisioning real utopias. London New York: Verso. ISBN 978-1-84467-617-0.
- Wright, Erik Olin. Alternatives to Capitalism: proposals for a democratic economy with Robin Hahnel (2014) New Left Project.
- Wright, Erik (2015). Understanding Class. London New York: Verso. ISBN 978-1-78168-945-5.
- Wright, Erik Olin (2019). How to Be an Anticapitalist in the Twenty-First Century. Verso Books. ISBN 978-1-78873-605-3.

=== Collected works ===
- Wright, Erik Olin; Fung, Archon (2003). Deepening democracy: institutional innovations in empowered participatory governance. London New York: Verso. ISBN 978-1-85984-466-3.
  This is part of the Real Utopias Project
- Wright, Erik (2005). Approaches to class analysis. Cambridge, UK New York: Cambridge University Press. ISBN 978-0-521-60381-2.
- Wright wrote the preface for: Gornick, Janet C.; Meyers, Marcia (2009). Gender equality: transforming family divisions of labor. London New York: Verso. ISBN 978-1-84467-325-4. Wright is also the book series' editor.

=== Selected journal articles ===
- Wright, Erik Olin; Levine, Andrew (September–October 1980). "Rationality and class struggle". New Left Review. I (23). New Left Review.
- Wright, Erik Olin (September–October 2006). "Compass points: towards a Socialist alternative". New Left Review. II (41). New Left Review.
- Wright, Erik Olin (February 2013). "Transforming capitalism through real utopias". American Sociological Review. 78 (1): 1–25. doi:10.1177/0003122412468882. S2CID 145566259.

== See also ==
- Theory of historical trajectory
