= Prefiguration =

Prefiguration may refer to:

- Prefiguration (politics), the reflection of a future society being sought by a group
- Prefiguration (theology), a relationship between elements of the Hebrew Bible / Torah, and aspects of Jesus's life as depicted in the New Testament
