= Epochalism =

Epochalism is an attitude of respect for the progressive spirit of the age and for social and technological advancement, which was contrasted by Clifford Geertz with what he termed the (essentialist) valorisation of traditional values. He viewed this distinction as a central social polarity pervading developing nations.

More broadly, Epochalism has been used to describe the post-Fordist, postmodern belief that the current era or epoch represents a fundamental clean break with the past; is something unique in human history; and due to this radical change, previous rules will no longer apply.

== Polarities in emerging economies ==
Epochalism in the developing world can be seen purely as a progressive force, favouring movement toward secularisation and industrial advance, as opposed to a regressive return to the traditional values of community and Gemeinschaft. However, in practice the situation is likely to be more complicated: nationalist struggles for independence have often relied on essentialist appeals to authentic ethnic communities and cultural practices, as well as to epochalism, in order to free themselves from dependence on Western model/Western control.

== Internet epochalism ==
The rapid rise of the World Wide Web led many digerati to see it as an unprecedented human phenomenon, wholly divorced from all past experience. Evgeny Morozov used the term epochalism to describe the prevalent 21st-century belief that "one is living in truly exceptional times – an intellectual fallacy I call 'epochalism'". Previous technological advances, as with the age of railways or the age of broadcasting, had of course made very similar claims for themselves; and A. E. Housman a century before had denounced the mind "which commands no outlook upon the past or the future, but believes that the fashion of the present, unlike all fashions heretofore, will endure perpetually".

Late modernity however, with its shortening of awareness of time-spans and its focus on the present, makes the short-sightedness of epochalism - with what Morozov saw as its dark fetishism of Internet-based solutions - an increasingly plausible intellectual posture.

== See also ==
- Cyber-utopianism – Subcategory of technological utopianism
- Cyborg anthropology – Study of humanity and technology
- Epoch – Reference point from which time is measured
- Social innovation – Practices aiming to meet social needs
- Strategic essentialism – Concept in postcolonial theory
- Three-age system – Stone, bronze and iron ages of pre-history
