= Racial pay gap in the United States =

Income inequality among races and ethnicities in the United States

In the United States, despite the efforts of equality proponents, income inequality persists among races and ethnicities. Asian Americans have the highest median income, followed by White Americans, Hispanic Americans, African Americans, and Native Americans. A variety of explanations for these differences have been proposed—such as differing access to education, two parent home family structure (70% of African American children are born to parents who are not legally married), high school dropout rates and experience of discrimination and deep-seated and systemic anti-Black racism—and the topic is highly controversial.

When the Civil Rights Act of 1964 was passed, it became illegal for employers to discriminate based on race; however, income disparities have not flattened out. After the passage of the act, the wage gap for minority groups narrowed, both in absolute difference with white wages and as a percentage of white wages, until the mid-1970s; at this time, progress for many racial minorities slowed, stopped, or reversed. As of 2009, the median weekly wage for African American and Hispanic workers was about 65 percent and 61 percent that of white workers, respectively. Asian workers' median wage was about 110 percent that of white workers. Overall, minority women's wages in comparison to those of white women are better than minority men's wages when compared to those of white men.

Median household income and mean personal income of adults aged 18-64 for selected U.S. groups, 2024 ACS PUMS. Rows are ordered by household median; householders of all ages are included. Personal income includes non-wage sources and people who are not employed.

Wages from the labor market are the primary source of income for most families in America, and income is a socio-demographic status indicator that is important in understanding the building of wealth.

== History of the racial wage gap ==
The documented history of the racial wage gap in the United States goes back before the Civil Rights Act, where many modern causes of racial wage inequity, such as educational disparities and discrimination, stem from were even more prevalent. Public state records from the 1930s indicate white owned schools in the south spent approximately $61 per student, or $1,074.14 in 2018 dollars when adjusted for inflation, compared to just $9 per student, or $158.48 in 2018 dollars. Simultaneously, the same schools saw a discrepancy in school time, with white schools in sessions for 156 days on average, compared to 123 days on average for black schools.

While statistical measures of wage discrepancy between black individuals and their white counterparts exist, wage inequity is still poorly understood due to a lack of literature with solid empirical data to link data with an accurate model of wage discrimination. During the 1970s and 80s the scholarly community debated the link between geographical location and wage inequality. Following urban-dominated studies and shifting research based on evolved conceptual and study-driven thinking, sociologists determined that the racial composition of a local population affects racial wage inequality. Studies performed by Leslie Mcall indicate immigration population density is one of the leading factors in racial wage inequality. While black immigrant earnings do not deviate from the already substandard average earnings, numbers on Hispanic and Asian immigrant earnings suggest more extensive negative effects, especially in areas of high immigration density. Hispanic and Asian women, in particular, are shown to be most affected; Hispanic and Asian women are shown to fill less skilled, domestic service jobs where the concentration of their black and white counterparts are lower. Barriers such as language show that such large dominance of immigrant population in such sectors only breed competition between lower-earning groups, further lowering average wages for such families. Since 1980, studies have found that, conversely, such low earning labor may actually boost the economy as a whole, keeping many corporations and higher level jobs afloat with cheap skilled work, boosting the salaries of native born hispanics and whites alike. As of 2020, black families have a median household income of just over $41,000, whereas white families have a median household income of more than $70,000.

Historically, there have been racial discrepancies not only in earnings from labor, but also in the benefits received voluntarily from employers. Benefits include health care, pensions, holiday and vacation days, among other government mandated and voluntary benefits. Studies done by Tali Kristal and Yinon Cohen show a link between such wage inequality and benefits received, with empirical evidence showing a steady degradation of benefits received for those of different ethnic groups. As of 2015, 32% of workers received benefits—including both mandatory and voluntary—from their employers, up from 28% in 1980. As of 2015, 44% of white employees received pension benefits, compared 36% for black employees and 28% for Hispanic employees. Health care showed similar trends, as the 2015 health coverage rates for white, black, and hispanic employees sit at 60%, 55%, and 46%, respectively.

== Causes ==
Studies of the wage gap for various minority races in the United States have revealed a number of factors that contribute to the differences in wages observed between white Americans and Americans of other races. The factors contributing to the wage gaps for various races and the degree to which they affect each race varies, but many factors are common to most or all races.

=== Educational disparities ===
Education, being one of the leading determinants of wage, contributes in a similar manner to the racial wage gap. Varying education levels among races lead to different wages for various racial groups. Education affects wages because it allows access to occupations of higher status that offer greater earnings. Mary C. Waters and Karl Eschbach studied the decrease in the black-white wage gap from the 1940s through the 1970s and found the primary reason for the decrease in the wage gap to be the narrowing of the education gap between blacks and whites.

=== Occupational distribution disparities ===
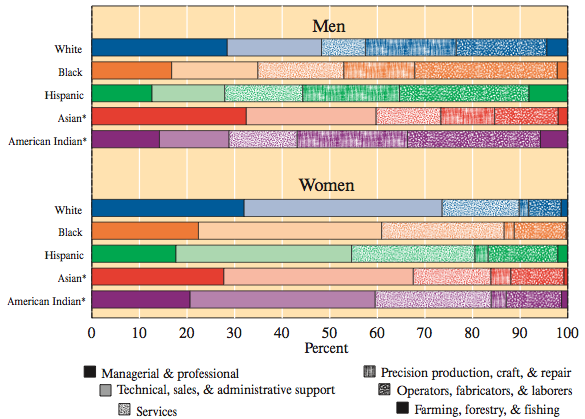
The occupation distribution of employed persons in the United States, 1997.

The way in which races are distributed throughout occupations affects the racial wage gap. White and Asian Americans, who have the highest median incomes, are concentrated more in professional, executive, and managerial occupations than blacks, Hispanics, or American Indians. Black and Hispanic workers are not only more likely to work in blue-collar or service jobs, but they tend to be concentrated in the lower-wage/skilled jobs, such as operators, fabricators, and laborers, rather than higher-paying precision production and craft jobs within those categories.

Occupational distribution varies for women of various races as well. White and Asian women are more likely to work in managerial and professional occupations, while black, Hispanic, and American Indian Women are more likely to work in service occupations. Thus, because certain races are more likely to have lower-paying jobs, gaps in median incomes between races arise.

A study conducted by Kenneth Couch and Mary Daly found that the occupational distribution between blacks and white improved between 1970 and the 1990s. In 1968, a black male was only 20 percent as likely to be employed as a manager as a white male and only 40 percent as likely to work in a professional occupation. In 1998, the percentages increased to 50% and 70 percent, respectively. Despite this improvement, however, occupational distribution differences still exist between blacks and whites. In 1998, a black male was still more likely than a white male to work in lower-skills jobs and less likely than a white male to work in high-paying jobs.

African Americans' skin tones become lighter, they tend to experience higher wages. This trend reflects how lighter skin can grant individuals closer access to the privileges associated with whiteness, irrespective of their racial categorization. The author(s) provide a table that states the following: dark-skinned blacks see an hourly wage of $11.72, medium-skinned blacks see an hourly wage of $13.23, and light-skinned blacks see an hourly wage of $14.72 and whites see an hourly wage of $15.94. These statistics challenge the beauty standards that favor lighter skin, implementing anti-discrimination policies and fostering awareness and education about the harmful effects of colorism. This article shows that racism still affects the African American community. From the statistics above, the difference between dark-skinned black wages and white wages is $4.22. $4.22 may seem like a relatively small amount but over time it can accumulate which proceeds to have a substantial impact on financial stability and quality of life. An hourly difference of $4.22, translates to about $8,700 annually. This large amount can cover expenses such as groceries, rent, utilities and even healthcare costs. This significant difference also causes financial stress which can cause anxiety, depression, strain on relationships and so much more.

=== Globalization ===
The globalization of the United States' economy in the 1970s and 1980s caused a shift in the U.S. income distribution. As the United States joined the global market economy, three outcomes occurred. Those who possessed financial and human capital, such as education, succeeded in the new economy because the money and skills they had to offer were in short supply. Those who possessed only labor did not fare well because cheap, physical labor was in oversupply in the global market.

In the new globalized economy that formed, much of the United States' manufacturing was exported, which affected most adversely the group of Americans in the lowest section of the education distribution, a section in which minority groups are overrepresented. The increase in overall wage inequality created by the new economy's lower demand for physical labor disproportionately affected minorities as well. The economic restructuring also served to create structural barriers to improvement for those with the least education and skills. Thus, the United States' shift to a globalized economy lead to greater income disparity between education groups, which, because of the uneven distribution of minorities in jobs and an overall increase in wage inequality, led to the wage gap between whites and minorities to increase.

=== Geographic distribution ===
The distance between jobs and the location of minorities' homes affects the ability of minorities to find profitable work. Saskia Sassen found that the redistribution of manufacturing jobs out of central cities in the 1980s negatively affected the wage gap between blacks and whites because most blacks live in cities.

=== Foreign birth ===
According to a study by Gwartney and Long (1978), a person of a minority race that was not born in the United States fares worse than those who are native born in terms of wages. The worst affected are men and women from Japan and China and Filipino women. The study found that there is a positive effect on economic outcomes for second generation immigrants, or the children of immigrants who are foreign born, which they believe means that there are specific traits of immigrant parents that are beneficial to the economic success of their children.

Immigration to the United States not only impacts people of Asian descent in wages, but also the Black population of America. Being the second major factor to wage inequalities, Black men and women that move into the United States are considered unskilled according to the American education standard. As a result, because of the increase of immigrant workers in the United States, the main beneficiaries of the wage inequality amongst Black immigrants as well as other immigrants are the populations of high skilled workers, and owners of capital, which is a population that is dominated by White individuals.

However, this isn't the only issue seen with immigrant or foreign birth when it comes to black men and women. Black women have expressed from personal experience that they had been considered less favorable compared to foreign workers when applying for jobs. Due to this there had been a competition between black workers born in America versus immigrant workers applying for jobs. "On the other hand, employers express preferences for immi-grant workers over black workers, and blacks express their sense of competition with immigrants over job opportunities (Kirschenman and Neckerman 1991) ".

=== Client channeling ===
When wage gaps in occupations for blacks and whites are compared, it is observed that occupations that depend on social networking for success tend to have the largest racial disparities, while occupations in which success does not depend on the type of clients served tend to have the least racial disparities. This difference has been attributed to employee channeling, or the assignment by white employers of minority employees to serve minority clients. The implications of employee channeling for a black real estate agent, for example, would be that they disproportionately served black clients and neighborhoods, resulting in lower sales commissions. In this way, employee channeling, identified as a social form of discrimination, contributes to the wage gap.

=== Current discrimination ===
When human capital, skills, and other factors contributing to the racial wage gap are taken into account, many researchers find that there is still a portion of the racial wage gap that is unexplained. Many attribute this to another factor: race. Differences in wages due solely to race is racial discrimination. Through the use of statistical controls, sociologists and economists "ask whether a given person with the same background characteristics, such as level of education, region of residence, gender, marital characteristics, has the same earnings as a statistically equivalent person from a different racial/ethnic group". Differences that emerge are taken as evidence of racial discrimination. Research has found wage and employment discrimination against blacks, Native Americans, Hispanics, and Asians; however, discrimination has been found to be a much larger contributing factor for black wages than wages of other races.

A study conducted by Grodsky & Pager (2001) found that individual attributes, such as human capital and region, account for just more than half of the black-white wage gap, and an additional 20 percent is due to different occupational distributions between blacks and whites. The remaining portion of the wage gap not accounted for by individual and occupational distribution factors is thought to be due, at least in part, to discrimination.

Discrimination based on race has been found in other research as well. Seventy-four percent of employers in one study were found to be racially biased against blacks, and blacks have been found to make lower wages than whites working in the same industry. White Latinos earn higher wages than nonwhite Latinos, regardless of whether they are native or immigrant, suggesting possible discrimination based on skin color. Additionally, many employers openly admit to discriminating against blacks and workers in the inner city, as one study by Kirschenman and Neckerman (1991) found. Hiring audits have also found discrimination in the labor market. Based on data from the 1990s to 2003, when black and white applicants hold the same credentials, whites receive jobs at a rate of 3:1.

=== Historical discrimination ===
Some have argued that the effects of historic discrimination have resulted in victimized families passing down less wealth, resulting in a shortage of resources (such as education and financial capital) to get a higher-paying job or start a business.

== Specific groups ==
Wage gaps have been identified for many races within the United States; however, research has found that the size and causes of the wage gap differs by race. For instance, the median black male worker earns 74 percent as much as the median white male worker, while the median Hispanic male worker earns only 63 percent as much.

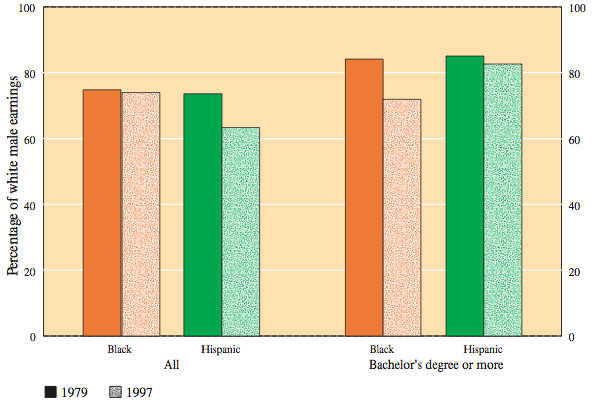
Black and Hispanic Male Earnings as a Percentage of White Male Earnings, 1979 and 1997.

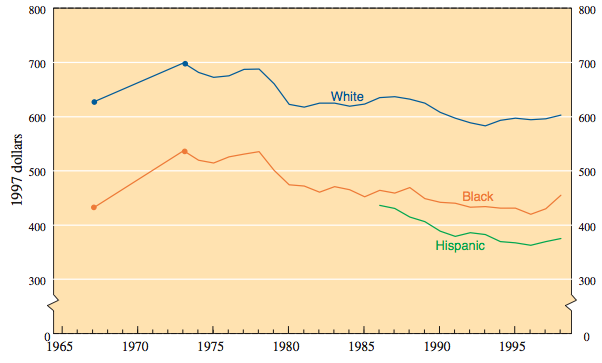
Comparison of weekly earnings by race, 1965-1995.

=== African American ===
The Civil Rights Act of 1964, which forbade employers from discriminating on the basis of race, was one of the earliest and greatest influences on the black-white wage gap. The act, along with the economic prosperity of the 1960s, contributed to rising black wages, increased education for blacks, and increased returns to education. Indeed, in 1940, weekly wages of the average black male were only 48.4 percent that of the average white male. In 1990, that had risen to 75 percent, a 60 percent improvement over five decades.

From the ending of legal segregation through the mid-1970s, the black-white wage gap continued to narrow. However, from the mid-1970s until almost 1990, progress in wage equality greatly slowed. From 1968-1979, the black-white wage gap decreased by an average of 1.2 percent each year. During the 1980s, it increased an average of .24 percent each year, and in the 1990s, it decreased an average of .59 percent each year. This proportional decrease was also accompanied by a decrease in the absolute difference of black and white wages.

Analyses have uncovered some of the underlying influences in the improvements of the black-white wage gap. During the decades of progress (the 1970s and 1990s), 30 percent of the wage gap convergence can be attributed to changes in black education and experience. More equalization in employment distribution also influenced the convergence during those decades. Factors identified as contributing to decreases in wage gap convergence include "shifts in industry demand, greater occupational crowding, relative deterioration of unobservable skills in blacks, and rising overall male wage inequality".

The decline of the black-white wage gap in the 1990s was greatest for those who have less than 10 years of potential experience, for whom it decreased 1.40 percent per year. Kenneth Couch and Mary C. Daly report in their 2002 study on black-white wage inequality that these decreases are the result of greater occupational diversity and reductions in unobserved or residual differences. In the first decade of the twenty-first century, the wage gap has fluctuated in terms of the ratio between black and white wages: 67.7 percent in 2000, 64.0 percent in 2005, 67.5 percent in 2008, and 64.5 percent in 2009. The absolute difference in black and white wages, however, has decreased over this period.

Black Americans now number 36 million, 12.9% of the total population. As of 2009, the median black male income was $23,738, compared to the median white non-Hispanic male income of $36,785.

While progress in wage inequality for blacks has been made since the passage of the 1964 Civil Rights Acts, inequality and discrimination still exist. A study conducted by Major G. Coleman (2003) reports that as black and white men have more similar competitive performance ratings, racial wage differences increase rather than decrease. He also found that black wages are less than white wages in the same industry. When no factors other than race are considered, Coleman predicts the black hourly wage to be $7.49 and the white hourly wage to be $8.92, 19 percent higher than the black hourly wage. When Coleman controlled for human capital, such as education and skills, the difference decreased to 11 percent. Coleman attributed this 11 percent difference to racial discrimination.

Grodsky and Pager also calculated wage differences, and found blacks to make $3.65 less per hour than whites in the private sector and $2.85 less in the public sector. Using statistical regressions, they found that human capital, region, and marital status account for 55 percent of the wage gap difference. An additional 20 percent of the wage gap was attributed to differences in occupational distributions between blacks and whites. Thus, 25 percent of the wage gap was unaccounted for by their model.

Black women experience more wage equality in comparison to white women than black men do to white men. By the mid-1970s, wages for black and white women were almost equal; however, since then, black women's wages have decreased about 10 percent relative to white women's wages. This difference that emerged has been attributed to the increase of white women in the labor force following the mid-1970s.

It has been suggested that when more white women began working, the advantages of black women from unmeasured differences in labor force attachment disappeared, revealing a racial wage gap. While an overall wage gap appeared between black and white women, by 1980, the earnings of black women with college degrees surpassed those of white women with college degrees. An understanding of the earnings of black women has recently become recognized as an important area of research due to the role that black women traditionally have in terms of family income: black married couples typically have relied more on women's earnings than other races and the percentage of single-parent, female-maintained families is highest among the black population.

=== Hispanic ===
The Hispanic minority group in the United States, composed of 50.3 million individuals in 2010, consists of much variance within itself with regard to wages, though all groups' wages are lower than those of non-Hispanic whites. In 2007, the largest Hispanic group, consisting of 29.2 million people, were individuals of Mexican origin, followed by 4.1 million people of Puerto Rican origin and 1.6 million people of Cuban origin. By 2009, the median income of Hispanics was lower than that of Whites and Asians, but much higher than the median wages of African-Americans; $38,039, compared to $32,584 for African-Americans and $49,777 for the general population. While their relative wages have fallen since 1979, this has been attributed to a demand for more educated workers and a gap in educational attainment, supported by the fact that college-educated Hispanic men's relative wages have changed little over time.

Unlike research findings for the black minority, it has been a converging finding that the largest contributing factor to the wage gap of Hispanics is observable skill characteristics, especially education. Thus, increased education has been seen to contribute to a decreased wage gap. College-educated Hispanic men have wages that are approximately 80 percent of those earned by college-educated white males and are 10 percent higher than wages earned by college-educated black males. College-educated Hispanic women earn approximately 90 percent of what college-educated white women earn, which is slightly more than the earnings of college-educated black women.

Despite the improvement in wages made by educational attainment, less educated Hispanic men still have less return to education than non-Hispanic men that are statistically comparable. A study conducted using 1980 census data on income that controlled for age, education, English language ability, nativity, and State/Metro residence, found a wage gap of 10 percent still existed for Hispanics compared to non-Hispanics. Additionally, discrimination against Hispanic men and women was found in an audit study of employers in San Diego and Chicago.

Because skills and educational attainment is the major contributing factor to the wage gap for Hispanics, differences in the education levels of the various Hispanic subgroups has been used to explain differences in their wages. The typical trend in wages for Hispanic subgroups is that Cubans do the best while Puerto Ricans do the worst, being severely disadvantaged even in comparison to blacks and American Indians. George J. Borjas attributes these group differences to two factors: 1. The nature of the migration decision (whether individuals migrated to the United States for political or economic reasons) and 2. The incentives for immigrants to adapt to the U.S. labor market.

When Hispanic persons immigrate to the United States, neither their physical nor human capital specific to their country of origin is easily transferred to the United States' labor market; human capital investments must be made in the United States in order to assimilate into the labor market. Borjas argues that the Hispanic groups that immigrate to the United States for economic reasons, rather than political reasons, have more incentive to acquire human capital in the United States and therefore do so faster than other groups. This faster acquisition of human capital results in better economic progress and higher wages.

Thus, the relative success of Cubans can be attributed to the fact that they invest in United States education and labor market skills faster and to a greater degree than other Hispanic groups. Borjas recognizes that one of the main reasons for Hispanic migration to the United States is political reasons, and he argues that political refugees have less incentive to assimilate and acquire human capital than those who migrate for economic reasons. This lower incentive leads to the education gaps seen between Hispanics and whites and therefore greatly contributes to the observed wage gap. Based on an analysis of Hispanic wages over the past six decades, Borjas concludes that, due to differing incentives to assimilate and other factors, Puerto Rican immigrants will wait twenty-five years before the assimilation process is reflected in their wages and Mexican immigrants will wait fifteen years.

Hispanic women, like black women, have experienced greater success in wage equality relative to males of their race. As of 1995, Hispanic women of all education levels, except for those without high school diplomas or associate degrees, had parity in earnings with white women. While this information is positive, a broader examination of Hispanic women's wages reveals that inequality still exists. In the 1990s, Hispanic women's full-time earnings fell in real terms. This difference is attributed mainly to differences in educational attainment. As of 2017, the average Hispanic woman in the United States made 87.4% of what their male counterparts earned, 75.8% of what white women white made, and only 62.1% of what white, American males earned annually.

=== Asian ===
As of 2010, 14,011,000 Asians of all ethnicities were living in America. Asian Americans are the only minority in the United States whose median income is higher than whites, assuming Pacific Islanders are not counted as a separate race. In 2009, the median income for Asian males was $37,330, compared to the median income for non-Hispanic white males of $36,785. In 2015, Asian American men were the highest earning racial group at $24/hour. Asian American men earned 117% as much as white American men ($21/hour) and have been out earning their white Americans counterparts since about 2000. Similarly, in 2015 Asian American women earned 106% as much as white American women.

However, not all Asian groups in the United States have such high wages; certain Asian groups have fared better than others in the United States labor market. East Asians from Hong Kong, Taiwan, China, Japan, and Korea have higher median wages and household income than Southeast Asian refugees from Laos and Vietnam, though all these groups still have median income above non-Hispanic whites. Cambodians and Hmong, on the other hand, do not, though their median income is still quite close to the national average and above that of blacks and Hispanics.

Some Asians including Mongolians, Vietnamese, Cambodians, Laotians, Filipinos, Pakistani, Bangladeshi, Nepalese as well as Hmong Americans had lower per capita incomes then all Asians as well as significantly lower personal earnings. Taiwanese, Asian Indian, Chinese and Japanese had the highest per capita incomes.

Average hourly wages for full-time, year-round workers in 2019

Group	Hourly wage
Indian	$ 51.19
Chinese	$ 43.35
Pakistani	$ 40.50
Japanese	$ 39.51
Korean	$ 39.47
Sri Lankan	$ 36.06
Malaysian	$ 35.25
Indonesian	$ 32.49
Fijian	$ 31.21
Mongolian	$ 31.13
AAPI average	$ 30.73
U.S. average	$ 29.95
Bangladeshi	$ 29.70
Vietnamese	$ 29.38
Filipino	$ 29.35
Nepalese	$ 28.44
Thai	$ 27.53
Tongan	$ 25.99
Hawaiian	$ 25.75
Samoan	$ 23.72
Laotian	$ 23.61
Cambodian	$ 23.12
Guamanian/Chamorro	$ 23.12
Burmese	$ 21.63

Educational Attainment: 2004 (Percent of Population 25 and Older)fig.11

Ethnicity	High School Graduation Rate	Bachelors' Degree or More
Asian Indians	90.2%	67.9%
Filipino	90.8%	47.9%
Chinese	80.8%	50.2%
Japanese	93.4%	43.7%
Korean	90.2%	50.8%
Total US Population	83.9%	27.0%

Part of the explanation for Asians' higher wages is their greater-than-average educational attainment: In 1990 38% of Asian Americans had graduated with a Bachelor's Degree or More. This ranged from 65.7%(Males) and 48.7%(Females) for Indian Americans to 7%(Male) and 3%(Female) of Hmong and Laotian Americans, who were more recent migrants at the time. By 2017, 61.8 percent of Asian people above the age of 25 living in the United States had earned an Associate's degree or higher. The higher educational attainment of Asians masks the fact that a wage gap exists between Asians and whites of the same occupations. Whites earn more than Asians in almost all occupational categories when other factors are controlled. Asians still make 8% less than whites in comparable jobs except for Asians who have been in the United States for one and a half generations, whom have reached full parity in income.

=== Native Americans ===
In 1990, the median family income for American Indians was $21,750, approximately 62 percent of the $35,225 median family income for all families. By 2010, the median household income for Native Americans was $38,806, compared to $51,914 for the total population, making them the second poorest race on average after African-Americans ($35,341). However, Native Americans are the poorest ethnic group when measured by per capita income. The wage gap has been attributed by some to "human capital differences." There is debate as to whether discrimination affects the wage gap.

== Wage Inequality by Race ==
The differences in earnings between white men and minority workers were analyzed by PayScale from a sample of 1.8 million workers between the years 2017 and 2019. It was found that Black men get paid 87 cents for every dollar a white male gets paid. However, it was also found that even as minority men climb up the corporate ladder, they are still getting paid less than white men who are in the same positions and have the same qualifications, the more professionally prepared black men become the smaller the pay gap becomes. To be more specific, Black men who are qualified get paid 98 cents for every dollar a white male gets paid.

Other issues are contributing to the racial wage gap. These being the opportunity gap and occupational segregation. These issues are influenced by the inability for minorities to have access to the same type of education as the white population, or sometimes to even be able to achieve a higher education. The NWLC found that full time Black women workers are getting paid 60 cents for every dollar a white male is getting paid. It is important to mention that Black women make up about 10% of the low-wage workforce. On average, while a Black full time working women in a high paying job makes about $70,000 yearly, a white male makes $100,000.

ThinkNow research found that even after completing undergraduate and graduate degrees, Black and Hispanics made much less money than white workers with the same, or even less education. Some of the policies that were proposed to confront the racial wage gap were reinforcing employment anti-discrimination laws, providing tax incentives for minority entrepreneurs, performing pay audits, banning the right to ask applicants about their salary history, and upgrading technology to assist during hiring decision to eliminate possible bias.

== Women and Wage Inequality ==
Minority women have been the backbone of the U.S. economy as workers and caregivers. During COVID, the U.S relied on minority women to provide essential worker services and keep the economy going, however also caused a lot of job losses within the group. Despite this, it has been shown that women of color still earn a lot less than white males and even minority men. This is largely attributed to the undervaluation that is given to work done by women and the many biases that come with that.

In a research study conducted by economists Francine Blau and Lawrence Kahn, it was found that 62% of the wage gap is attributed to differences in types of industries employed in, differences in hours worked, and differences in years of experiences. However, the other 38% of the wage gap is mostly attributed to discrimination and biases against minority women. Occupational segregation has played a big part in driving minority women towards low-wage jobs such as service jobs like being cashiers, care jobs such as nursing assistants, and domestic work as maids and housekeepers.

Minority women disproportionately shoulder responsibilities as primary caregivers and breadwinners for their family. Therefore, driving them to accept or choose jobs such as service and care industries that pay a lot less and have a lot less benefits simply because they are jobs that are readily available. These types of jobs are usually able to offer different shifts throughout the night and day, making it more accessible for these minority women to work part time in order to fulfill their obligations as caretakers in their own family, putting them at a financial disadvantage as well.

== Private vs. public sector employment ==
The racial wage gap for blacks and whites has been observed to be lower in the public sector than the private sector. In a 2001 analysis, a $3.65 difference per hour was found between blacks and whites in the private sector, a 34 percent difference. In contrast, a smaller difference of $2.85 per hour was found in the public sector, a 21 percent difference. For the 23 percent of blacks that work in the public sector, evidence suggests that wages are based primary on individual qualifications, but for the 77 percent of blacks employed in the private sector, this assertion has not been found to be as valid.

Additionally, a larger percentage of the wage gap was found to be accounted for by the human capital characteristics of educational attainment and potential years of experience in the public than private sector. Also, an effect encountered in the private sector in which black males have higher absolute wages as they increase in status but lower wages relative to whites of the same status, has not been found in the public sector.

== Policy discussion ==
Various solutions to eliminate the racial wage gap have been proposed. Research has identified different wage gaps and sources of wage gaps for different minorities, suggesting that public policies will affect different minorities in different ways and that effective strategies must take into account the unique circumstances of each race group. Sociologist Douglas Massey offers two solutions to alleviate wage inequality: greater investments in education and elimination of racial segregation. He notes that, in a globalized economy, those with only physical labor to offer suffer.

He argues that investments in education, especially higher education, will result in higher rates of economic growth and lower income inequality. By eliminating racial segregation, Massey argues that many divides between races that exist would be broken down, including income segregation. To accomplish the abolition of racial segregation, Massey argues, simple enforcement of legislation already in place, such as the Fair Housing Act, the Home Mortgage Disclosure Act, and the Community Reinvestment Act, is required. For more group-specific policies, focus on education and language inequalities could be helpful in equalizing employment opportunities, but other more specific policies are dependent on further research on wage gaps for various groups.

To tackle wage inequality specifically in companies, random job audits at the national, state, and local levels have been suggested. Audits have been used to study and find wage inequality in the past and could be used as way to actively monitor the presence of the racial wage gap in companies. Other policies that could possibly help merge the wage gap are guaranteeing employment and significantly raising the minimum wage~~.~~ Another factor that should be taken into consideration is Medicare for all. Poor access to healthcare and healthcare outcomes are important because many low-income people can't have access to it. Many low-income individuals have health issues that prevent them from being part of the working population, therefore putting them at a financial disadvantage. Even if they are able to access healthcare, it ends up destabilizing them financially.

== Limitations and criticisms of the racial wage gap ==
Evaluating and understanding the causes and consequences of the racial wage gap for various races is an important part of understanding racial inequality in the United States; however, the wage gap does not encompass all aspects of inequality and therefore is useful when understood in conjunction with other types of inequalities. For example, sociologists Mary C. Waters and Karl Eschbach note that other types of inequalities are important for a holistic understanding of inequality in the United States, "including health and demographic measures, such as infant mortality rates, life expectancy, morbidity, and disability.

Ethnic and racial groups also differ in rates of homeownership, residential segregation, overall wealth, exposure to crime and toxic pollutants, and in access to power in the upper reaches of our society". Thus, the racial wage gap is just one aspect of inequality in the United States.

A criticism of the racial wage gap has been noted by a few scholars: the racial wage gap fails to account for the number of people of a specific race that are unemployed. Examining median incomes does not reflect the growing racial disparity in joblessness. The Butler-Heckman hypothesis states that the least-skilled members of society are also the ones who are most likely to be not working, suggesting that the wage gap does not account for the overall difference in wages between races. An analysis of the black-white wage gap which accounted for unemployment found that when unemployment was included in the calculation of the weekly wages convergence from 1950 to 2000, the convergence percentage went from 13 percent to only 3 percent.

== See also ==
- List of ethnic groups in the United States by household income
- Racial inequality in the United States
- Racial wealth gap in the United States
- Affluence in the United States § Race
- White privilege § Employment and economics
