= Real utopian sociology =

Study of feasible utopian models for society

Real utopian sociology is an emancipatory social science created and practiced by Erik Olin Wright, a utopian studies scholar. The apparent contradiction in its name is intentional: this sociology seeks to find existing utopian projects and evaluate their potential to replace systems of domination, particularly as an anti-capitalism strategy. Simply put, real utopian sociology is the study of feasible utopian models for society and pathways to achieve them.

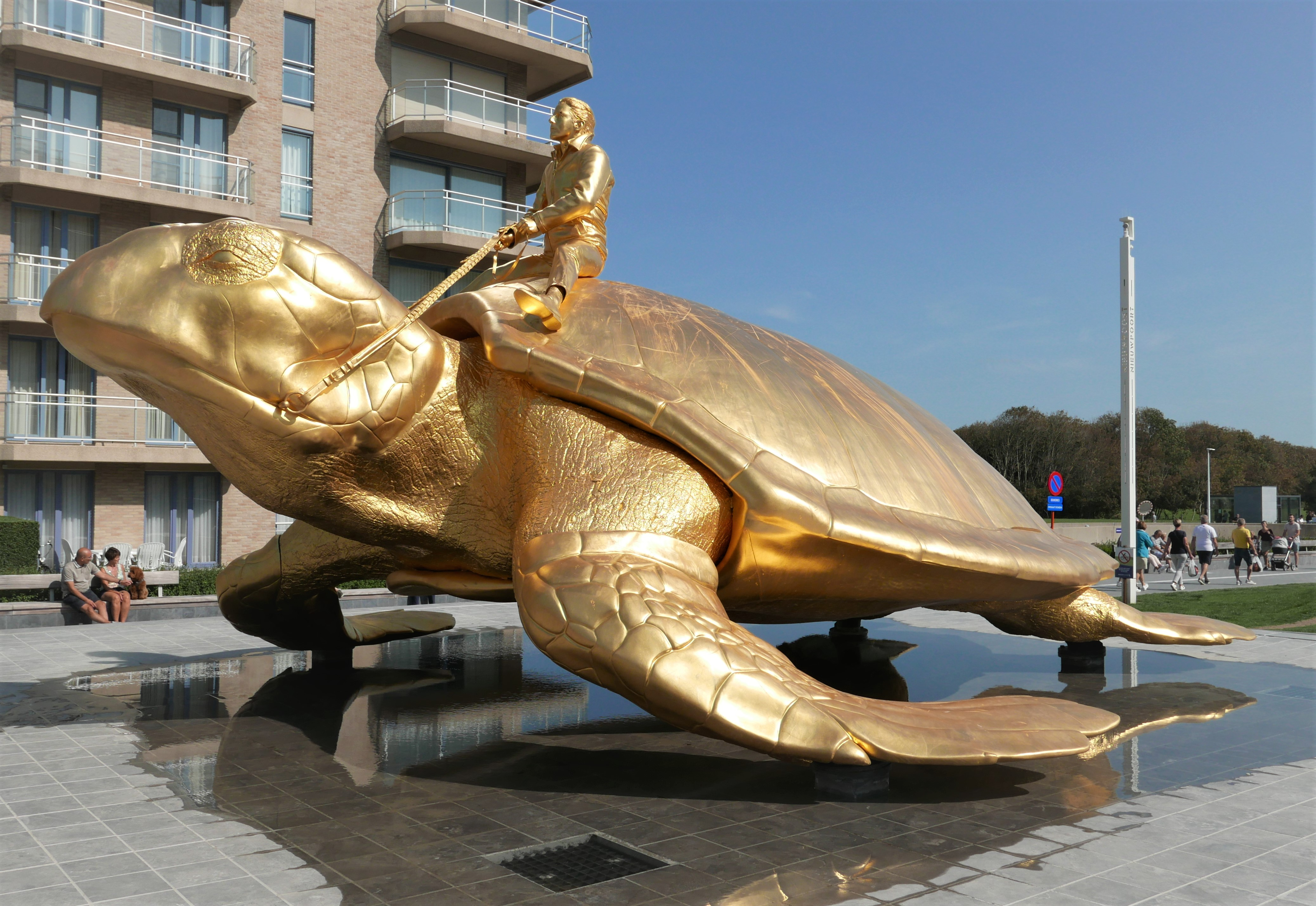
Sculpture "Searching for Utopia", Jan Fabre, Nieuwpoort, Belgium.

== Overview ==
Starting in 1991, Wright organized a series of workshop conferences known as The Real Utopian Project that model the practice of real utopian sociology. The conferences are sponsored by the A.E. Havens Center for Social Justice at the University of Wisconsin–Madison and structured around "a provocative manuscript that lays out the basic outlines of a radical institutional proposal." This manuscript is then sent to 15–20 scholars, who write essays on the topic. Prior to the conference these essays are circulated to all the conference participants and then each is discussed at the conference. Following the conference, participants have the opportunity to revise their work before it's collectively published in Verso's Real Utopias Project series; with the exception of papers from the first 1991 conference, which were not published as a series.

Past conference topics include: Basic Income Grants; Secondary Associations and Democratic Governance; A Model for Market Socialism, which was organized around the book, A Future for Socialism, rather than a manuscript; Efficient Redistribution in Advanced Capitalism; Deepening Democracy; Rethinking Redistribution; Pensions and the Control of Capital Accumulation; Institutions for Gender Egalitarianism: Creating the Conditions for Egalitarian Dual Earner/Dual Caregiver Families; Legislature by Lot; Pathways to a Cooperative Economy; and Democratizing Finance.

== See also ==
- Digital socialism
