= Interstitial revolution =

Theoretical means of societal transformation

Interstitial revolution is a theoretical means of societal transformation through progressively and strategically enlarging spaces of social empowerment. Interstitial revolution (or transformation) builds on the concept of prefigurative politics which has a long history in anti-capitalist thinking, going back nearly two hundred years in the anarchist tradition. Prefigurativism is neatly summed up by the early twentieth century Constitution of the Industrial Workers of the World which declared: "By organizing industrially we are forming the structure of the new society within the old."

This has classically been the approach recommended by several theorists of social anarchism, including Pierre-Joseph Proudhon, Gustav Landauer, Paul Goodman, and Murray Bookchin. In recent years, prominent analytical Marxists (including John Holloway and Erik Olin Wright) have called attention to the lack of strategy for greater systemic change within prefigurativism and have attempted to construct models of societal transformation utilizing interstitial devices as an alternative to the traditional Marxist theory of revolution.

== Theory ==
Central to the concept of interstitial revolution is the perspective of seeing the state as a complex multitude of institutions organized by a dominant power structure, but not so integrated that it controls all activities within it. Interstitial theorists suggest that within this system, radically democratic collectives (such as Worker owned cooperatives) have the opportunity to gain a foothold in the "cracks" of the capitalist state. These egalitarian institutions, working on their own or in tandem, can then use their social and economic power along with traditional forms of struggle to outmaneuver and erode limits to their growth imposed by capitalist institutions, thereby creating more space for collective economic and political power. Interstitial theorists state that over time, enough progressive struggles and victories could potentially lead to the overcoming of the capitalist state.

Erik Olin Wright points out that there may be boundaries to the growth of an interstitial movement in which the most adept strategies of collective economic and social pressure are not enough to overcome the power of capitalist hegemony. He suggests in this case it may be necessary to resort to a more traditional form of "ruptural" revolution. However, he stresses that a substantial network of democratically run organizations is a key foundation to any revolution that wishes to yield a result of deepening democracy and creating the conditions for human flourishing.

== Mechanism ==
Wright suggests that the first stage of an interstitial revolution could be starting a cooperative bank. A cooperative bank would function as a normal bank with the exception that it would give loans primarily to organized workers who wished to collectively purchase their employer's company in order to start a worker owned cooperative. Wright says this could be both an answer to a coming small business succession crisis and an opportunity for democratically run companies to gain a foothold in the economy.
