= Theory of historical trajectory =

The theory of historical trajectory is part of Karl Marx's historical materialism. This theory has been analyzed by Erik Olin Wright, whose work has been cited in relation to it. According to Wright, while Marx's theory of social change is often regarded as obsolete, it is nonetheless an important and likely still the "most ambitious attempt to construct a scientific theory of alternatives to capitalism". What Marx attempted was to develop a deterministic theory of "long term impossibility of capitalism". According to Marx, the very same problems that should make capitalism fail should also provide the means for the new, more democratic and egalitarian society to arise.

== Theory ==
Wright identifies five core arguments in Marx's thought. The first of these is that capitalism is an unsustainable economic system in the long run. Here, Marx claims that capitalism's replacement by another economic system is an inevitability, as through time it creates conditions in which it can no longer function. This part of Marx's argument does not predict what type of system will replace capitalism, it simply stresses the capitalist self-destructive nature. This prediction is based on four trends Marx observed:

- productivity is steadily increased;
- the reach of capitalism increases both in the geographical sense and in the penetration of the society (commodification);
- capital tends to be increasingly concentrated;
- periodic economic crises (recessions) tend to be increasingly more severe.

A related, more theoretical argument that Marx made here was based on the labor theory of value (only labor produces value). Marx believed that as non-labor (and by extension of the labor theory, non-profitable) factors become increasingly important, profits will decline, eventually approaching zero. This is commonly referred to as the tendency of the rate of profit to fall.

Second, Marx predicted the increase in the class struggle. Here, Marx argued that over time, the working class will grow in numbers (proletarianization), and it will also become more aware of the inefficiencies of the capitalist system (class consciousness). Third, according to Marx, when the working class and its allies would become sufficiently numerous and organized, they would challenge and overthrow the system in a revolution (world revolution). Marx assumed here that the resistance of the capitalist class would continue to the end, preventing any non-violent, democratic transformation, and thus that the transition into a post-capitalism era would require the use of violence to overcome such resistance.

Next, Marx argued that a post-capitalist system would most likely be one where means of production are collectively owned and democratically controlled (socialism). This likelihood was the result of the fact that the overthrow of capitalism was to be carried out primarily by the working class, and thus after the revolution, it would be the class to hold power and thus most influential and shaping the new world order. Finally, Marx proposed the "communism destination thesis": that socialism will eventually lead to the development of a classless society, without the need for a state (stateless communism), and operating according to the principle, "from each according to his ability, to each according to his need".

== Praise and criticism ==
Wright describes the theory framed by Marx as "brilliant, if ultimately unsatisfactory." Wright outlined four major deficiencies he believed to have existed in the theory:

- periodic crises (recessions) have not, so far, exhibited any clear trend of becoming increasingly severe;
- class structures, rather than producing a homogenous working class, have become increasingly complex;
- the working class did not become increasingly organized and powerful; and,
- capitalism, even when overthrown, was not replaced by democratic socialist societies and certainly not by communism.
