= Prefigurative politics =

Anarchist theory

Prefigurative politics are modes of organization and social relationships that aim to reflect the future society being sought by a group. In practice, they involve building a new society "within the shell of the old" by living out the values and social structures the group desires for the future.

According to Carl Boggs, who coined the term, prefigurative politics aims to embody "within the ongoing political practice of a movement [...] those forms of social relations, decision-making, culture, and human experience that are the ultimate goal," thus aligning the means and the ends of social change. Prefigurative politics are sometimes justified based on the premise that the ends a social movement can achieve are "fundamentally shaped by the means it employs." Prefigurativism is the attempt to enact prefigurative politics.

== History ==
Boggs wrote about prefiguration in the context of the revolutionary movements in Russia, Italy, Spain, and the US New Left.

In Althusser’s Lesson (1974) French philosopher Jacques Rancière discuss the role of Leninist organisations and which societies their forms of organisations “prefigures” (p. 182, La Fabrique, 2011, reedition). “[W]hat society is prefigured in their organizations and in their forms of the division of labour, of the exercise of power and of the distribution of knowledge?” (p. 104 in the English translation, Continuum Books, 2011) Thus - with exact words and a clear meaning - predating the coinage of the term by Boggs, although without explicating it as a specific concept as such.

In 1979 Sheila Rowbotham applied the concept to the London Free School, which she claimed prefigured the politics of the early libertarians of the early 1970s. In the following year Wini Breines, the then-professor of sociology and women's studies in Northeastern University, applied the concept to the US Students for a Democratic Society (SDS). In 1984, John L. Hammond applied the concept to the Portuguese Revolution.

The politics of prefiguration rejected the centrism and vanguardism of many of the groups and political parties of the 1960s. It is both a politics of creation, and one of breaking with hierarchy. Breines wrote:

The term prefigurative politics [...] may be recognized in counter institutions, demonstrations and the attempt to embody personal and anti-hierarchical values in politics. Participatory democracy was central to prefigurative politics. [...] The crux of prefigurative politics imposed substantial tasks, the central one being to create and sustain within the live practice of the movement, relationships and political forms that "prefigured" and embodied the desired society.

For Breines, "prefigurative politics" centers on "participatory democracy", understood as an ongoing opposition to hierarchical and centralized organization that requires a movement that develops and establishes relationships and political forms that "prefigure" the egalitarian and democratic society that it seeks to create. Furthermore, she sees prefigurative politics as strictly connected to the notion of community, referring to it as a network of relationships that are more direct, more personal, and more total than the formal, abstract and instrumental relationships that are embedded in contemporary state and society.

Anarchists around the turn of the twentieth century clearly embraced the principle that the means used to achieve any end must be consistent with that end, though they apparently did not use the term "prefiguration". For example, James Guillaume, a comrade of Mikhail Bakunin, wrote, "How could one want an equalitarian and free society to issue from authoritarian organisation? It is impossible."

One of the greatest examples during the 20th century in this regard is the comunismo libertario (libertarian communism) society organized by anarcho-syndicalists such as the Confederación Nacional del Trabajo (CNT), or in English the National Confederation of Labour, for a few months during the Spanish Civil War. Workers took collective control of the means of production on a decentralized level and used mass-self communication as a counter-power in order to give useful information on a wide range of options, from vegetarian cooking to the treatment of sexually transmitted infections.

The concept of prefiguration later came to be used more widely, especially in relation to movements for participatory democracy. It has especially been applied to Italian Autonomism in the 1960s, the US antinuclear movement of the 1970s and 1980s and the anti-globalization movement at the turn of the 21st century.

== Perspectives on prefigurative politics ==
Anthropologist David Graeber in Fragments of an Anarchist Anthropology described the prefigurative politics of those at the 1999 Seattle WTO protest:

When protesters in Seattle chanted "this is what democracy looks like," they meant to be taken literally. In the best tradition of direct action, they not only confronted a certain form of power, exposing its mechanisms and attempting literally to stop it in its tracks: they did it in a way which demonstrated why the kind of social relations on which it is based were unnecessary. This is why all the condescending remarks about the movement being dominated by a bunch of dumb kids with no coherent ideology completely missed the mark. The diversity was a function of the decentralized form of organization, and this organization was the movement's ideology. (p. 84)

Political theorists Paul Raekstad and Saio Gradin define prefigurative politics as:

the deliberate experimental implementation of desired future social relations and practices in the here-and-now.

They argue that prefigurative politics is essential for developing agents with the powers, drives, and consciousness to reach a free, equal, and democratic future society.

According to Adrian Kreutz, political theorist at New College, Oxford, the practice of prefigurative politics, or prefigurativism, can be defined as:

a way of engaging in social change activism that seeks to bring about this other world by means of planting the seeds of the society of the future in the soil of today's. [...] Prefigurativism is a way of showing what a world without the tyranny of the present might look like. It is a way of finding hope (but not escapism!) in the realms of possibility––something that words and theories alone cannot provide. [...] As a form of activism, prefigurativism highlights the idea that your means match the ends you can expect. It highlights that social structures enacted in the here-and-now, in the small confines of our organisations, institutions and rituals mirror the wider social structures we can expect to see in the post-revolutionary future.

Additionally, Darcy K. Leach wrote in the Wiley-Blackwell Encyclopedia of Social and Political Movements that:

For much of its history, the prefigurative impulse was only characteristic of the beginning stages of a rebellion and faded as the movement became more centralized. From the 1960s onward, however, the approach has become both more clearly articulated and more widespread, such that one can now identify a stable prefigurative tendency or wing in a wide range of movements around the world, most notably in women's, environmental, autonomous, peace, and indigenous rights movements, and on a more global scale in the movements against neoliberal globalization

Boggs analyzed three common patterns of decline in the prefigurative movements which are the following:

Jacobinism, in which popular forums are repressed or their sovereignty usurped by a centralized revolutionary authority; spontaneism, a strategic paralysis caused parochial or anti-political inclinations inhibit the creation of broader structures of effective coordination; and corporativism, which occurs when an oligarchic stratum of activists is co-opted, leading them to abandon the movement's originally radical goals in order to serve their own interests in maintaining power.

== Examples of prefigurative political programs ==
- What began as a rebellion of the Zapatista Army of National Liberation (Spanish: Ejército Zapatista de Liberación Nacional, EZLN) in 1994, quickly morphed into a social movement that criticized both national and global power structures and sought the empowerment of local communities through everyday practices of de facto autonomy. After negotiations with the state failed regarding indigenous rights and culture, the Zapatistas proceeded to develop their own structures of self-government, autonomous education, healthcare, justice, and agrarian and economic relations, among other transformative practices. This movement continues to raise important issues such as the role of culture and identity in popular mobilization, social spaces for organizing, the possibility of redefining power from below, and moreover have posed self-reflective questions about conventional definitions of politics, Western positivist epistemologies and about the need of decolonizing research in general and in oppressed communities in particular.
- The community land trust model provides a method of providing cooperatively-owned, resident-controlled permanent housing, outside of the speculative market.
- In Argentina, the occupation and recuperation of factories by workers (such as Zanon), the organizing of many of the unemployed workers movements, and the creation of popular neighborhood assemblies reflect the participants' desire for horizontalism, which includes equal distribution of power among people, and the creation of new social relationships based on dignity and freedom.
- The occupation movements of 2011 in Egypt and the Arab world, in Spain, and in the United States embodied elements of prefiguration (explicitly in the case of Occupy Wall Street and its spinoffs in occupations around the United States). They envisaged creating a public space in the middle of American cities for political dialogue and achieved some of the attributes of community in providing free food, libraries, medical care, and a place to sleep. In Spain, the 15-M movements and take-the-square movements organized themselves and stood up for "a real democracy, a democracy no longer tailored to the greed of the few, but to the needs of the people."
- The Black Panther Party of the United States led a variety of community social programs from the early 1960s, which sought to realize the Party's Ten Point Program. Programs included Free Breakfast for Children, community health clinics, and after-school programs and Liberation Schools that focused on Black history, writing skills, and political science.
- Cooperation Jackson is an organization in Jackson, Mississippi, that aims to build a solidarity economy through prefigurative politics from ground-up as a foundation for Black self-determination and broader social transformation. It is rooted in the Jackson-Kush Plan, a long-term vision for radical change developed by the New Afrikan People's Organization and the Malcolm X Grassroots Movement.
- The global Baháʼí Faith community strives to realise a model of society by developing a pattern of community life and administrative systems in ways which increasingly embody the principles contained in its principles and teachings, which include the oneness of mankind, gender equality, and harmony of science and religion. Several authors have written about the community's grassroots praxis as a living experiment in how to progressively instantiate religious or spiritual teachings in the real world.
- By abstaining from animal products, vegans model a world largely or entirely free from animal exploitation by humans.

== Disfiguration ==
Environmental scholars have identified phenomena that operate disfiguratively – conversely to prefiguration,, lead to the impossibility of reaching desirable future and "actively foreclose the imagination of alternative political orders beyond the status quo". Within environmental studies, environmental entities such as toxic gases, air pollution or the ubiquitous presence of fertilizers are commonly conceptualized as political actants capable of shaping human politics. Consequently, these environmental degradation can act in a way that hampers any potential human political goals and entrench the status quo. Similarly to prefigurative efforts, these environmental entities embody and enact the relations and organizational forms fostered by broader society. However, rather than expanding imagination and generating new possibilities, they cement the existing state of affairs and limit the capacity to environ alternative projects. Trlifaj, working on politics of severe air pollution in Sarajevo, terms these restrictive political effects disfigurative, describing a dynamic that "loops any transformative efforts back into the gridlock of the status quo".

== See also ==
- Alter-globalization
- Anarchy Alive!
- Anti-fascism
- Capitol Hill Occupied Protest
- Consensus decision-making
- Counter-economics
- Direct action
- Direct democracy
- Dual power
- Empowerment
- Food Not Bombs
- Interstitial revolution
- Labour movement
- Political representation
- Social anarchism
- Socialism: Utopian and Scientific
- Squatting
- Temporary Autonomous Zone
- The purpose of a system is what it does
- Unionization
- Utopia
- Wildcat strike
- Workers' self-management
