= Cyber-utopianism =

Subcategory of technological utopianism

Cyber-utopianism, web-utopianism, digital utopianism, or utopian internet is a subcategory of technological utopianism and the belief that online communication helps bring about a more decentralized, democratic, and libertarian society. The desired values may also be privacy and anonymity, freedom of expression, access to culture and information or also socialist ideals leading to digital socialism.

== Origins ==
The Californian Ideology is a set of beliefs combining bohemian and anti-authoritarian attitudes from the counterculture of the 1960s with techno-utopianism and support for neoliberal economic policies. These beliefs are thought by some to have been characteristic of the culture of the IT industry in Silicon Valley and the West Coast of the United States during the dot-com boom of the 1990s. Adam Curtis connects it to Ayn Rand's Objectivist philosophy in the film All Watched Over by Machines of Loving Grace (TV series). Such an ideology of digital utopianism fueled the first generation of Internet pioneers.

== Examples ==
=== Political usage ===
One of the first initiatives associated with digital technologies and utopianism was the Chilean Project Cybersyn. Project Cybersyn was an attempt of cybernetic governance for implementation of socialist planning under President Salvador Allende. The book Towards a New Socialism argues against the perception of digital socialism as a utopia. Digital socialism can be categorized as a real utopian project.

Cyber socialism is a name used for the practise of file sharing as a violation of intellectual property rights and whose legalisation was not expected - a utopia.

Cyber-utopianism serves as a base for cyber-populism. Electronic democracy as suggested and practised by Pirate Parties is being seen to be an idea motivated by cyber-utopianism. In Italy, the Five Star Movement extensively uses cyber-utopian rhetoric, promising direct democracy and better environmental regulations through the Web. In this case, they used the wonder or digital sublime associated with digital technologies to develop their political vision.

=== Cognate utopias ===
Cyber-utopianism has been considered a derivative of extropianism, in which the ultimate goal is to upload human consciousness to the internet. Ray Kurzweil, especially in The Age of Spiritual Machines, writes about a form of cyber-utopianism known as the Singularity; wherein, technological advancement will be so rapid that life will become experientially different, incomprehensible, and advanced.

=== Hospitality exchange services ===
Hospitality exchange services (HospEx) are social networking services where hosts offer homestays for free. They are a gift economy and are shaped by altruism and are examples of cyber-utopianism.

== Criticism ==
The existence of this belief has been documented since the beginning of the internet. The bursting of the dot-com bubble diminished the majority-utopian views of cyberspace; however, modern day "cyber skeptics" continue to exist. They believe in the idea that internet censorship and cyber sovereignty allows repressive governments to adapt their tactics to respond to threats by using technology against dissenting movements. Douglas Rushkoff notes that, "ideas, information, and applications now launching on Web sites around the world capitalise on the transparency, usability, and accessibility that the internet was born to deliver". In 2011, Evgeny Morozov, in his 2011 book The Net Delusion: The Dark Side of Internet Freedom, critiqued the role of cyber-utopianism in global politics; stating that the belief is naïve and stubborn, enabling the opportunity for authoritarian control and monitoring. Morozov notes that "former hippies", in the 1990s, are responsible for causing this misplaced utopian belief: "Cyber-utopians ambitiously set out to build a new and improved United Nations, only to end up with a digital Cirque du Soleil".

Criticism in the past couple of decades has been made out against positivist readings of the internet. In 2010, Malcolm Gladwell, argued his doubts about the emancipatory and empowering qualities of social media in an article in The New Yorker. In the article, Gladwell criticises Clay Shirky for propagating and overestimating the revolutionary potential of social media: "Shirky considers this model of activism an upgrade. But it is simply a form of organizing which favors the weak-tie connections that give us access to information over the strong-tie connections that help us persevere in the face of danger."

Cyber-utopianism has also been compared to a secular religion for the postmodern world. In 2006, Andrew Keen wrote in The Weekly Standard that Web 2.0 is a "grand utopian movement" similar to "communist society" as described by Karl Marx.

== See also ==
- Arab Spring § Results
- Cyberwarfare
- Internet activism § Criticism
- Internet manipulation
- Mass surveillance
- Surveillance capitalism
- Terrorism and social media
