= Strategic essentialism =

Concept in postcolonial theory

Strategic essentialism is a major concept in postcolonial theory that was introduced in the 1980s by Indian literary critic and theorist Gayatri Chakravorty Spivak. It refers to a political tactic in which minority groups, or ethnic groups mobilize on the basis of shared identity attributes to represent themselves.

These identity attributes commonly include:

- Gender – see postcolonial feminism
- Race – see critical race theory
- Gender identity — see queer theory
- Language and ethnicity – see linguistic anthropology
- Some other cultural grouping

While strong differences may exist between members of these groups, and amongst themselves, they engage in continuous debates. Proponents of strategic essentialism argue it is sometimes advantageous for them to temporarily "essentialize" themselves, despite it being based on erroneous logic, and to bring forward their group identity in a simplified way to achieve certain goals, such as equal rights or antiglobalization.

Spivak's understanding of the term was first introduced in the context of cultural negotiations, never as an anthropological category. In her 2008 book Other Asias, Spivak disavowed the term, indicating her dissatisfaction with how the term has been deployed in nationalist enterprises to promote (non-strategic) essentialism.

The concept also comes up regularly in queer theory, feminist theory, deaf studies, and specifically in the work of Luce Irigaray, who refers to it as mimesis.

== See also ==
- Epochalism
- Identity politics
- Intersectionality
- Social constructionism
- Stuart Hall (cultural theorist)
