= César Rodríguez Garavito =

Human rights and environmental lawyer

César Rodríguez-Garavito
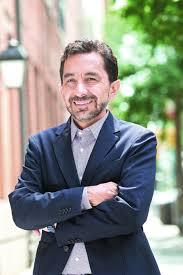
- Born: Colombia
- Other name: César Rodriguez
- Education: University of los Andes, University of Wisconsin-Madison, NYU, National University of Colombia
- Occupations: Professor of Law and Chair, Center for Human Rights and Global Justice, NYU Law; Founding Director, NYU More-Than-Human Life (MOTH) Program

César Rodríguez-Garavito (born in Colombia, 1971) is an Earth rights and human rights scholar and field lawyer, whose work focuses on international environmental law, Indigenous peoples' rights, technology, and more-than-human rights. He is a Professor of Law and Chair of the Center for Human Rights and Global Justice at New York University School of Law. Rodríguez-Garavito is the founding director of the NYU More-Than-Human Life (MOTH) Program and NYU Earth Rights Research and Action (TERRA). He is also the founding director of the Commons on Machines, Policy, Automation & Society (COMPASS) at NYU Law.

A lawyer and sociologist by training, Rodríguez-Garavito is the author of numerous books and articles on more-than-human (MOTH) rights, climate change litigation, the human rights movement, socio-environmental conflicts, Indigenous rights, and business and human rights. He has served as an Adjunct Judge of the Constitutional Court of Colombia, an expert witness of the Inter-American Court of Human Rights, and a litigator in prominent climate change, Indigenous rights, and socioeconomic rights cases. He is also a member of the Science Panel for the Amazon, an expert group of distinguished scientists, Indigenous leaders, scholars, and others that assesses the state of the Amazon and issues evidence-based findings and recommendations.

== Education ==
He holds a Ph.D. and an M.S. (Sociology) from the University of Wisconsin-Madison, an M.A. from NYU’s Institute for Law and Society, an M.A. (Philosophy) from the National University of Colombia, and a J.D. from the University of los Andes.

== Academic career ==
Rodríguez-Garavito is currently a Professor of Law and Chair of the Center for Human Rights and Global Justice at New York University School of Law. Rodríguez-Garavito is the founding director of the Earth Rights Research and Action (TERRA) Program and the More-Than-Human Life (MOTH) Program. He is also a Faculty Associate at the Berkman Klein Center for Internet & Society at Harvard University and the founding director of the Commons on Machines, Policy, Automation & Society (Compass) at NYU Law.

Rodríguez-Garavito's work has advanced new ideas and legal actions on issues such as climate justice, Indigenous rights, and what he proposes to call “more-than-human rights” (rights of nature). They include rights-based climate and biodiversity litigation, research with Project CETI on the legal implications of AI-assisted translation of sperm whale communication, and a collaboration with the Society for the Protection of Underground Networks (SPUN) and the Fungi Foundation on legal actions to protect the fungal kingdom of life. As part of the MOTH Program, Rodríguez-Garavito works with Project CETI and Hinemoana Halo, an Aotearoa-based, Indigenous-led conservation and environmental sustainability organization, on the implementation of He Whakaputanga Moana: Whale Protection and Legal Personhood Declaration. Produced by a coalition of Indigenous Pacific Islanders, He Whakaputanga Moana recognizes the legal personhood and inherent rights of whales. His contributions to Earth rights have been recognized with a More-Than-Human Fellowship by the London Design Museum.

Rodríguez-Garavito has collaborated closely with scientists, writers and artists such as Robert Macfarlane, Merlin Sheldrake, David Gruber, Toby Kiers, Giuliana Furci and Cosmo Sheldrake on projects related to the rights of nature. He has served as a strategy advisor to leading international and domestic human rights organizations in different parts of the world. His work has been featured in numerous media outlets, including The New York Times, The Guardian, BBC, National Geographic, Emergence Magazine, El País, Mongabay and Atmos.

One of his MOTH collaborations—the “Song of the Cedars”—was awarded a spot in the UN Museum's Top 10 Culture for Impact 2024 List. The song was authored by four humans—musician Cosmo Sheldrake, writer Robert Macfarlane, mycologist Giuliana Furci, and Rodríguez-Garavito—and Los Cedros, a cloud forest in Ecuador that had been recognized as a subject of rights by the Ecuadorian Constitutional Court. With the help of partners in Ecuador, a petition was filed to legally recognize Los Cedros as one of the co-authors of the song, thereby challenging the anthropocentrism of copyright law.

Rodríguez-Garavito has held a range of teaching positions, including appointments as a visiting professor at Stanford Law School, Brown University, the University of Melbourne, the University of Pretoria, and the Getulio Vargas Foundation (Brazil). He has served as cofounder and director of Dejusticia, as well as an associate professor of law and director of the Center for Socio-Legal Research and the Global Justice and Human Rights Program at the University of the Andes (Colombia).

== Selected bibliography ==
- César Rodríguez-Garavito (ed.), More Than Human Rights: Ecology of Law, Thought & Narrative for Earthly Flourishing (NYU Law MOTH Program, 2024).
- Litigating the Climate Emergency: How Human Rights, Courts, and Legal Mobilization Can Bolster Climate Action(Cambridge University Press)
- Human Rights 2030: Existential Challenges and a New Paradigm for the Field,” in N. Bhuta et al. (eds). The Struggle for Human Rights (Oxford University Press).
- Climatizing Human Rights: Economic and Social Rights for the Anthropocene,” in M. Langford & K. Young (eds.) Oxford Handbook of Economic and Social Rights (OUP)
- The Globalization of the Vernacular: Mobilizing, Resisting, and Transforming International Human Rights from Below,” in P. Alston, ed. Essays in Honor of Sally Merry (OUP)
- A Human Right to a Healthy Environment? Moral, Legal and Empirical Considerations,” in J. Knox and Ramin Pejan, The Human Right to a Healthy Environment (CUP)
- Reframing Indigenous Rights: The Right to Consultation and the Rights of Nature and Future Generations in the Sarayaku Legal Mobilization,” (with C. Baquero) in G. de Burca, Legal Mobilization for Human Rights (OUP).
