= Charles Camic =

American sociologist

- Born: Charles Michael Camic; September 27, 1951 (age 74)
- Education: University of Pittsburgh (B.A., 1973); University of Chicago (M.A., 1975; Ph.D., 1979)
- Awards: 2011 Distinguished Lifetime Achievement Award from the American Sociological Association's History of Sociology Section
- Scientific career
- Fields: Sociology
- Workplaces: Northwestern University; University of Wisconsin-Madison
- Thesis: Social experience and cultural change: family, schooling, and professions in eighteenth-century Scotland (1979)
- Academic advisors: Donald N. Levine
- Doctoral students: Eduardo Bonilla-Silva

Charles Michael Camic (born September 27, 1951) is the Lorraine H. Morton Professor of sociology at Northwestern University. His research focuses on sociological theory, the sociology of science, and historical sociology.

== Education and career ==
Camic received his B.A. in sociology summa cum laude from the University of Pittsburgh in 1973. He went on to receive his M.A. and Ph.D., also in sociology, from the University of Chicago in 1975 and 1979, respectively. In 1979, he became an assistant professor of sociology at the University of Wisconsin-Madison, where he was promoted to associate professor in 1984 and to full professor in 1988. In 1999, he became the Martindale-Bascom Professor at the University of Wisconsin-Madison. In 2006, he left the University of Wisconsin-Madison to become the John Evans Professor of sociology at Northwestern, where he was appointed the Lorraine H. Morton Professor in 2016.

== Editorial activities ==
From 1999 to 2003, Camic was the co-editor-in-chief of the American Sociological Review, along with Franklin D. Wilson. As of February 2017, he is a senior editor for Theory and Society.
