= Devah Pager =

American sociologist

- Born: March 1, 1972; Honolulu, Hawaii, US
- Died: November 2, 2018 (aged 46); Cambridge, Massachusetts, US
- Education: University of Wisconsin–Madison; Stanford University; University of Cape Town; University of California, Los Angeles
- Scientific career
- Fields: Sociology, Criminology
- Workplaces: Harvard University, Princeton University
- Thesis: The mark of a criminal record (2002)
- Doctoral advisor: Robert M. Hauser
- Other academic advisors: Erik Olin Wright

Devah Iwalani Pager (March 1, 1972 – November 2, 2018) was an American sociologist best known for her research on racial discrimination in employment and the American criminal justice system. At the time of her death, she was Professor of Sociology and Public Policy at Harvard University. She was a class of 2011 William T. Grant Scholar.

== Biography ==
Devah grew up in Hawaii. She attended Punahou.

Pager earned her doctorate at the University of Wisconsin–Madison in 2002. Prior to that she received master's degrees from Stanford University and the University of Cape Town in South Africa, and a B.A. in psychology from University of California, Los Angeles in 1993. She was a 1989 graduate of Punahou School.

As part of her doctoral dissertation research Pager conducted an experiment in which she enlisted young men to pose as job applicants with similar characteristics. She found that a black applicant received a callback or job offer half as often as an equally qualified white applicant. A black applicant with a clean record got a callback or job offer about as often as a white applicant with a felony conviction. She later replicated the experiment in 2009 with Bruce Western and Naomi Sugie and found that black applicants without criminal records received fewer callbacks than white applicants with criminal records. The dissertation was awarded the "Best Dissertation Prize" by the American Sociological Association and was later published as a series of articles and a book, Marked: Race, Crime, and Finding Work in an Era of Mass Incarceration (University of Chicago Press, 2007).

Pager's work has been widely featured in the media, including The New York Times, The Wall Street Journal, the Chicago Tribune, and in CNN's documentary Black in America. Pager's work was frequently cited by supporters of Ban the Box, a movement which aims to ban employers from asking potential employees if they have a criminal record on their application.

Pager died of pancreatic cancer on November 2, 2018, at the age of 46.

== Selected bibliography ==
- Devah Pager (March 2003). "The Mark of a Criminal Record". American Journal of Sociology. 108 (5): 937–975. doi:10.1086/374403. JSTOR 374403. S2CID 11568703.
- Devah Pager; Bruce Western; Bart Bonikowski (2009-10-01). "Discrimination in a Low-Wage Labor Market: A Field Experiment". American Sociological Review. 74 (5): 777–799. doi:10.1177/000312240907400505. PMC 2915472. PMID 20689685.
- Pager, Devah; Western, Bruce; Sugie, Naomi (2009). "Sequencing Disadvantage: Barriers to Employment Facing Young Black and White Men with Criminal Records". Annals of the American Academy of Political and Social Science. 623 (1): 195–213. doi:10.1177/0002716208330793. PMC 3583356. PMID 23459367.
- Devah Pager (2015). Investigating Prisoner Reentry: The Impact of Conviction Status on the Employment Prospects of Young Men - Scholar's Choice Edition. Creative Media Partners. ISBN 978-1-297-04600-1.
- Devah Pager (2007). Marked: Race, Crime, and Finding Work in an Era of Mass Incarceration. University of Chicago Press, 2008. ISBN 978-0-226-64485-1.
- Lincoln Quillian; Devah Pager (2010). "Estimating Risk: Stereotype Amplification and the Perceived Risk of Criminal Victimization". Social Psychology Quarterly. 73 (1): 79–104. doi:10.1177/0190272509360763. PMC 2914342. PMID 20686631.
- Eric Grodsky; Devah Pager (2001). "The Structure of Disadvantage: Individual and Occupational Determinants of the Black-White Wage Gap" (PDF). American Sociological Review. 66 (4): 542–567. doi:10.2307/3088922. JSTOR 3088922.
