= Racism without Racists =

2003 book about color-blind racism

- First edition
- Author: Eduardo Bonilla-Silva
- Subject: Color-blind racism
- Publisher: Rowman & Littlefield
- Publication date: 2003
- Pages: 214
- ISBN: 978-1-4422-7623-9

Racism without Racists: Color-Blind Racism and the Persistence of Racial Inequality in the United States is a book about color-blind racism in the United States by Eduardo Bonilla-Silva, a sociology professor at Duke University. It was originally published by Rowman & Littlefield in 2003, and has since been re-published four times, most recently in June 2017. The fourth edition was published soon after Barack Obama's election, and includes a new chapter on what Bonilla-Silva calls "the new racism". It was reviewed favorably in Science & Society, Urban Education, Educational Studies, and Multicultural Perspectives.
