= Eduardo Bonilla-Silva =

American sociologist (born 1962)

- Born: February 6, 1962 (age 64); Bellefonte, Pennsylvania, U.S.
- Education: University of Puerto Rico, Río Piedras (BA); University of Wisconsin, Madison (MA, PhD)
- Known for: Systemic racism and racial "colorblindness" in the United States
- Spouse: Mary Hovsepian
- Children: 1
- Scientific career
- Fields: Sociology
- Workplaces: Duke University
- Thesis: Squatters, Politics, and State Responses: The Political Economy of Squatters in Puerto Rico, 1900–1992 (1993)
- Doctoral advisor: Charles Camic

Eduardo Bonilla-Silva (born February 6, 1962) is an American sociologist and professor of sociology at Duke University. He was the 2018 president of the American Sociological Association.

== Early influences ==
Bonilla-Silva was educated in Puerto Rico, where he double majored in Sociology and Economics. In his work White Supremacy and Racism in the Post-civil Rights Era, he says: "Myriam Muniz, Arturo Torrecillas, Carlos Buitrago, Juan Jose Baldrich, Carlos Ramos [...] shaped my sociological imagination." Bonilla-Silva has stated that Jose A. Padin and Charles Camic were two mentors who influenced his development as a sociologist.

As an early sociologist, Bonilla-Silva was focused on Marxist ideas. He learned this from his mentor, Arturo Torrecillas. Torrecillas served as a professor of the Sociology and Anthropology Department at Bonilla-Silva's undergraduate university.

== Family and early life ==
Born in Pennsylvania, Silva grew up in a family of intellectuals. His father, Jacinto Bonilla, was a university lecturer and his mother, Ruth Maria Silva, was a sociologist, like her son.

Bonilla-Silva married Mary Hovsepian He has a son named Omar Francisco Bonilla from a previous marriage.

== Education and career ==
Bonilla-Silva received his BA in sociology and economics from the University of Puerto Rico, Río Piedras Campus, in 1984, and his MA and PhD from the University of Wisconsin–Madison in 1987 and 1993, respectively. He taught at the University of Michigan from 1993 to 1998 and at Texas A&M University from 1998 to 2005, after which he joined the Duke faculty.

== Work and views ==
Bonilla-Silva is known for researching the role of race in public life. In 2003, he published the book Racism Without Racists: Colorblind Racism and the Persistence of Racial Inequality in the United States, which discusses his view that systemic racism is a major problem in the United States, despite the fact that Americans do not do or say something overtly racist on a regular basis. As of 2014, it was his best-selling book. He has said that systemic racism in the United States did not disappear in the 1970s, as many Americans believe, but merely became less overt and harder to identify. He has also blamed the fact that formerly all-white colleges in the United States did not change their curriculum or culture after integrating for racist incidents re-occurring on the campuses of these colleges. He has described these colleges as "historically white", and has said that this problem is not one of bad apples, but that it may be one of the entire apple tree.

In October 2017, Bonilla-Silva criticized Supreme Court Justice John Roberts for referring to social science as "sociological gobbledygook."

== Publications and evolution of sociological views ==
In both his personal life and as a student, Bonilla-Silva encountered many influences. His professors, friends, coworkers, and eventually his own students all impacted his growth and development as a sociologist. As a student, he was influenced by Marxist teachings. However, he changed his focus soon as he learned and encountered racial prejudice and felt a calling to deal with the racism in the United States. This is evidenced by the explosion of published literature centering the structure of race in society and its influence on people.

In one of his earliest literature, Bonilla-Silva suggested a "structural" understanding of racism, a relatively unexplored and revolutionary way of approaching this idea. This was shown in his work Rethinking racism: Toward a structural interpretation. This work was done near the end of his time while the scholar was at the University of Michigan, before he started working at Texas A&M University.

As Bonilla-Silva continued to expand the boundaries of the understanding of racism, his literature reflected these new findings. Examples include:

- Racism Without Racists (4th edn)
  - In this book published in 2014, Bonilla-Silva delves into a discussion regarding race relationships in modern America. Despite the political correctness that has permeated society, racism still exists on a broad scale. The stereotyping and categorization of people by their skin color or heritage continues to be a big role in society. The author bring this issue to light, considering a broad range of perspectives. Moreover, he also takes a historical view on this issue since the past has a really big influence on how modern society thinks and functions.
- "What We Were, What We Are, and What We Should Be: The Racial Problem of American Sociology"
  - This journal publication comes in light of Bonilla-Silva's new position as president of the American Sociological Association. He considers this new position along with the problems that sociologists like him are trying to solve in the realm of race relationships and racism. In a way, this publication serves as a public statement of his mission, his values as the new president.
- Other works also include:
  - "The new racism: The racial regime of post-civil rights America", Studies in Critical Social Sciences, January 1, 2011
  - "Introduction: Examining, debating, and ranting about the Obama phenomenon", Political Power and Social Theory, Vol. 22, December 1, 2011
  - "The Sweet Enchantment of Color Blindness in Black Face: Explaining the 'Miracle,' Debating the Politics, and Suggesting a Way for Hope to be 'For Real' in America"
  - "The invisible weight of whiteness: the racial grammar of everyday life in contemporary America", Ethnic and Racial Studies, February 1, 2012
  - "The last shall be first: Best Books in the Race Field Since 2000", Contemporary Sociology, January 1, 2013
  - "The 2008 Elections and the Future of Anti-racism in 21st Century America Or How We Got Drunk with Obama's Hope Liquor and Failed to See Reality", Humanity and Society, Vol. 34, Issue 3, 2010, pp. 222–232.

== Awards ==
Bonilla-Silva received the 2011 Cox-Johnson-Frazier Award from the American Sociological Association (ASA). In 2009, he and Tukufu Zuberi both received the Oliver C. Cox Award from the ASA's Section on Racial and Ethnic Minorities for their book White Logic, White Methods: Racism and Methodology.
