= Theory and Society =

- Discipline: Social sciences, History
- Language: English
- Edited by: Kevin McCaffree and Jonathan H. Turner

Publication details
- History: 1974-present
- Publisher: Springer Science+Business Media
- Frequency: Bimonthly
- Impact factor: 1.4 (2024)

Standard abbreviations
- ISO 4: Theory Soc.

Indexing
- ISSN: 0304-2421 (print); 1573-7853 (web)
- LCCN: 78647592
- JSTOR: 03042421

Links
- Journal homepage; Online archive

Theory and Society is a bimonthly peer-reviewed academic journal covering theoretical analyses of social processes and phenomena. It was established by Alvin Gouldner in 1974, whose widow Janet was the journal's executive editor from his death in 1980 until 2023. It is published by Springer Science+Business Media and the editors-in-chief are Kevin McCaffree and Jonathan H. Turner. The editorial structure of the journal was overhauled by Springer Nature in December 2023.

== 2023 editorial board changes ==
Since 1980 Janet Gouldner had been Theory and Society's executive editor. As of 2023, the senior editors were (in alphabetical order) Charles Camic, Nitsan Chorev, Gil Eyal, Neil Gross, Greta Krippner, Mara Loveman, Chandra Mukerji, Monica Prasad, David Swartz, Iván Szelényi.

The corresponding editors were Javier Auyero, Tim Bartley, Jean Beaman, Karida Brown, Miguel A. Centeno, Katie E. Corcoran, Claire Decoteau, Paul DiMaggio, Eva Fodor, Harriet Friedmann, Marion Fourcade, Roger Friedland, Marco Garrido, Alya Guseva, Jack A. Goldstone, Josée Johnston, Christian Joppke, Jaeeun Kim, Krishan Kumar, Magali Sarfatti Larson, Omar Lizardo, Tey Meadow, Juan Pablo Pardo-Guerra, John N. Robinson III, Chris Tilly, Tianna S. Paschel, Michael Schudson, Bruce Western and Marina Zaloznaya.

In December 2023, the journal's editorial board resigned, stating that this was the result of Springer Nature, the publisher, bringing in new editors-in-chief without the board's approval. In January 2024, the journal's corresponding editors also resigned and published a letter describing Springer Nature's actions as "a clear violation of our profession’s academic norms and standards".

Responding to the criticism, Springer Nature's Publishing Director for Humanities, Social, Behavioural and Health Sciences, Teresa Krauss, said: "We concluded that it was necessary to reduce turnaround times and to develop the journal to better serve our authors and the wider research community". Expanding on this, Krauss said: "a decision had to be made to press ahead with appointing a successor with an editorial vision that reflected our shared goals for the journal".

=== Launch of Theory and Social Inquiry ===
Following the editorial board change, some of the editors who had resigned launched a new journal Theory and Social Inquiry which is hosted by Open Library of Humanities, a non-profit organization. Theory and Social Inquiry describes itself as "the descendent journal of Theory and Society", saying that Theory and Social Inquiry "embodies the spirit of the original Theory and Society". At the launch of Theory and Social Inquiry, Open Library of Humanities Executive Director Caroline Edwards said: "As scholars, we need to stand up to commercial publishers when they vandalise the academic integrity of journals, which have been carefully built up over decades by volunteer academic labour".

== Editorial advisory board ==
As of 2026, the members of the journal's editorial advisory board include Musa Al-Gharbi, Salvatore Babones, Paul Bloom, Karen Cook, Alice Dreger, Christopher Ferguson, Alan Fiske, Peter Hedström, Rosemary Hopcroft, Guillermina Jasso, Eric Kaufmann, Hubert Knoblauch, Richard Machalek, Mark Moffett, Steven Pinker, Fabio Rojas, Theda Skocpol, Cass Sunstein and Brad Wilcox.

== Abstracting and indexing ==
The journal is abstracted and indexed in:

- Current Contents/Social & Behavioral Sciences
- EBSCO databases
- Index Islamicus
- International Bibliography of Periodical Literature
- ProQuest databases
- Scopus
- Social Sciences Citation Index

According to the Journal Citation Reports, the journal has a 2024 impact factor of 1.4.
