= Theory and Social Inquiry =

- Discipline: Social sciences
- Language: English
- Edited by: Monica Prasad, Nitsan Chorev

Publication details
- History: 2025-present
- Publisher: Open Library of Humanities
- Frequency: Continuous
- Open access: Diamond open access
- ISO 4: Find out here

Indexing
- ISSN: 3049-5881

Links
- Journal homepage; Issues; Articles

Theory and Social Inquiry is a peer-reviewed academic journal addressing analyses of social life. The journal was established by the former editorial board of Theory and Society and describes itself as "the descendant of the journal Theory and Society" founded by Alvin W. Gouldner in 1974. The journal is published in partnership with Open Library of Humanities, a nonprofit organisation. The journal is published according to a diamond open access model, meaning that authors do not pay to publish and readers do not pay to access the journal.

== History ==
From December 2023 to January 2024, the Theory and Society editorial board and corresponding editors resigned as a result of Springer Nature unilaterally appointing new editors-in-chief. The resigning editors said that Springer Nature had committed "a clear violation of our profession’s academic norms and standards". Theory and Social Inquiry was then launched as a successor to Theory and Society. The editorial board of Theory and Social Inquiry said that it "embodies the spririt of the original Theory and Society".

On August 10, 2024, a launch party for Theory and Social Inquiry was held at the Intercontinental Hotel in Montreal during the annual meeting of the American Sociological Association.

In the editors' introduction to the inaugural issue, Krippner and Prasad wrote: "We seek to publish articles that ask big questions, theorize boldly, and draw on careful empirical investigation to arrive at novel understandings of the social world and its possibilities for change". Making reference to the events occurring during the second presidency of Donald Trump, the lead editors framed the launch of the journal within the context of "a disturbing trend towards increasingly aggressive public attacks on scholars – and the need to resist them".

At the time of its first issue, the lead editors of Theory and Social Inquiry were Monica Prasad and Greta Krippner. Other editors include Karida Brown, Claire Decoteau, Gil Eyal, Jaeeun Kim, Mara Loveman, Tey Meadow, Chandra Mukerji, Adam Reich, David Leon Swartz, and Paige L. Sweet.
