= George Musgrave (academic) =

British academic and rapper

Dr George Musgrave FRSA
- Occupation: Academic
- Awards: Fellow of the Royal Society of Arts

Academic background
- Education: University of Cambridge, University of East Anglia

Academic work
- Discipline: Cultural Sociology, Entrepreneurship, Popular music studies
- Institutions: Goldsmiths, University of London
- Notable works: Can Music Make You Sick? Measuring the Price of Musical Ambition
- Musical career
- Also known as: Context / Context MC
- Genre: Hip-hop
- Years active: 2008–2020
- Label: Sony/ATV Music Publishing EMI Music Publishing

George Musgrave FRSA FRSPH is an academic whose research examines the psychosocial conditions of work in creative careers, with a particular focus on the music industry. He is based at Goldsmiths, University of London. He has previously held positions at the University of Westminster and has been a guest lecturer at New York University.

Musgrave is also a rapper and performs under the stage-name of Context. He released his debut mixtape Dialectics in 2008, Mental Breakdown Music in 2009, the EPs Stealing My Older Brother's Tapes and Hindsight is the Purest Form of Romance in 2014, and the album The England No One Cares About (Soundtrack) in 2024.

== Early life and education ==
Musgrave went to Wymondham College from 2000 to 2005, and achieved a first-class degree in Social and Political Sciences at the University of Cambridge in 2009. He then went on to do an MA in Politics, Philosophy and Economics in 2010 and completed his ESRC funded PhD at the Centre for Competition Policy at the University of East Anglia in 2014

== Academic career ==
He is the co-author of Can Music Make You Sick? alongside Sally Anne Gross, a two-part report published in 2016 and 2017, and subsequent book in 2020 published by University of Westminster Press. The study examined relationships between working conditions in the music industry and experiences of distress and wellbeing among musicians. The research - described as "the largest known study into mental health and the music industry" - led directly to the establishment of the first 24/7 mental health helpline for musicians - Music Minds Matter - launched by the charity Help Musicians UK in 2017. Upon release, the book was an Amazon Number 1 Best Seller in the 'Sociology of Work' category.

Musgrave has also collaboratively led When Music Speaks, a series of research reports commissioned by the Danish Partnership for Sustainable Development in Music that examined musicians' working lives and wellbeing in Denmark in 2023 and 2024. This research helped establish a Code of Conduct for the Danish music industry. In addition, Musgrave has been involved in the launch of It's Time To Talk, a nationwide survey examining working lives and mental health in the Indian music industry.

His research has been published in journals including The Lancet, The Lancet Psychiatry, Scandinavian Journal of Psychology, and Poetics.

His second book, The England No One Cares About: Lyrics from Suburbia, was published by Goldsmiths Press/MIT Press in 2024.

He sits on the Editorial Advisory Board of the academic journal Cultural Trends and the Clinical Advisory Board of Backline, a charity in the United States of America offering mental health and wellbeing support to those working in the music industry.

== Music career ==
Musgrave began his career in music in 2008 under the stage-name Context whilst enrolled as a student. In 2010 he released the single "Off with their Heads" which featured a cameo from Ed Sheeran. The video was featured on MTV. He then released the single "Listening to Burial" in 2011 which was featured on BBC Radio 1's national playlist.

In 2012, he was the winner of MTV's Brand New For 2012 unsigned competition, joining Charli XCX and Lana Del Rey on the list. During this period he released a "Fire in the Booth" freestyle with Charlie Sloth and an SB.TV 'Warm Up Session'. In 2013 he signed a worldwide publishing and songwriting deal with Sony/ATV Publishing/EMI Music Publishing.

He released his four-track EP, Stealing My Older Brother's Tapes in 2014. It was noted for its intricate social commentary with samples from Goldie, Underworld and Altern8. During this time released the song "Small Town Lad Sentiments" which went on to be remixed by Mike Skinner. It was featured on Context's second EP, Hindsight is the Purest Form of Romance released later in 2014.

In 2015, Musgrave took a break from music to focus on his academic career. However, he returned in 2018 to release the single "Better Than This". This was followed by the single "Take Me Back" in 2019 which featured Great Skies. His album The England No One Cares About (Soundtrack) was released in 2024.

== Publications ==
- Gross, S & Musgrave, G (2016) Can Music Make You Sick? A Study Into the Incidence of Musicians' Mental Health - Part 1: Pilot Survey Report, Help Musicians UK/MusicTank
- Gross, S & Musgrave, G (2017) Can Music Make You Sick? A Study Into the Incidence of Musicians' Mental Health - Part 2: Qualitative Study and Recommendations, Help Musicians UK/MusicTank
- Musgrave, G (2017) Collaborating to Compete: The Role of Cultural Intermediaries in Hypercompetition, International Journal of Music Business Research, Vol.6(2), pp. 41–68
- Gross, S., Musgrave, G & Janciute, L (2018) Well-Being and Mental Health in the Gig Economy: Policy Perspectives on Precarity, CAMRI Policy Briefs, University of Westminster Press
- Musgrave, G (2019) Making Sense of My Creativity: Reflecting On Digital Autoethnography, Journal of Artistic and Creative Education, Vol.13(1), pp. 1–11
- Musgrave, G (2020) Avicii: True Stories - Review, Dancecult: Journal of Electronic Dance Music Culture, Vol.12(1), pp. 94–97
- Gross, S & Musgrave, G (2020) Can Music Make You Sick? Measuring the Price of Musical Ambition, University of Westminster Press
- Athanassiou, D & Musgrave, G (2021) Building a Heavy Metal World: Cultural Entrepreneurship in the Polish People's Republic, Artivate: A Journal of Entrepreneurship in the Arts, Vol.10(1), pp. 1–19
- Chaparro, G & Musgrave, G (2021) Moral Music Management: Ethical Decision-Making After Avicii, International Journal of Music Business Research, Vol.10(1), pp. 1–14
- Musgrave, G (2022) Lessons from the Loss of Avicii: Business Ethics, Responsibility, and Mental Wellbeing, SAGE Business Cases, Sage Publications Ltd
- Leisewitz, A, Musgrave, G & Franklin, M (2022) SHAPESLewisham and the Shape of Lewisham: Connectivity, Communication and Construction in a Creative Enterprise Zone, Goldsmiths (University of London)/Mayor of London Project Report
- Musgrave, G (2022) 'Losing Work, Losing Purpose': Representations of Musicians' Mental Health in Time of Covid-19, in, Morrow, G, Tschmuck, P; Nordgard, D (eds) Rethinking the Music Business: Music Contexts, Rights, Data and COVID-19, Springer, pp. 11–28
- Leisewitz, A & Musgrave, G (2022) Does Spotify Create Attachment? Algorithmic Playlists, Intermediation and the Artist-Fan Relationship, Culture Unbound: Journal of Current Cultural Research, 14(1), pp. 75–100
- Musgrave, G (2022) Music and Wellbeing vs Musicians' Wellbeing: Examining the Paradox of Music-Making Positively Impacting Wellbeing, but Musicians Suffering from Poor Mental Health, Cultural Trends
- Musgrave, G (2023) Musicians, their Relationships, and their Wellbeing: Creative Labour, Relational Work, Poetics, 96, 101762
- Loveday, C, Musgrave, G & Gross, S (2023) Predicting anxiety, depression and wellbeing in professional and non-professional musicians, Psychology of Music, 51(2), pp. 508–522
- Musgrave, G, Howard, C, Schofield, A, Silver, E & Tibber, M (2023) Mental health and the music industry: An evolving intervention landscape, The Lancet Psychiatry, 10(5), pp. 311–313
- Musgrave, G. Gross, S. & Carney, D. (2024) When Music Speaks: Mental health and next steps in the Danish music industry – Parts 1, 2, 3 and 4, Danish Partnership for Sustainable Development in Music
- Clift, S., Bathke, A., Daffern, H., Davies, C., Grebosz-Haring, K., Kaasgaard, M., McCray, M., Musgrave, G. & Thun-Hohnstein, L. (2024) The WHO-Lancet Global Series on the Health Benefits of the Arts, The Lancet, 403(10434), p. 1335
- Kaasgaard, M., Grebosz-Haring, K., Davies, C., Musgrave, G., Shriraam, J., McCray, M. & Clift, S. (2024) It is premature to formulate recommendations for policy and practice based on arts and health research? A robust critique of the CultureforHealth (2022) Report, Frontiers in Public Health, 12: 1314070, pp. 1–12
- Musgrave, G., Gross, S. & Klein, M. (2024) The dark side of optimism: Musical careers, belief and gambling, Musicae Scientiae, 28(4), pp. 634–648
- Kaasgaard, M., Grebosz-Haring, K., Davies, C., Musgrave, G., Shriraam, J., McCray, M. & Clift, S. (2024) Is it premature to formulate recommendations for policy and practice based on arts and health research? A robust critique of the CultureforHealth (2022) Report, Frontiers in Public Health, 12: 1314070, pp. 1–12
- Musgrave, G. (2024) Out of the frying pan and into the fire: Music education, mental health, and our students' futures, in, Arditi, D & Nolan, R (eds.) Handbook of Critical Music Industry Studies, Palgrave Macmillan, pp. 119–135
- Musgrave, G (2024) The England No One Cares About: Lyrics from Suburbia, MIT Press/Goldsmiths Press
- Musgrave, G., Gross, S. & Carney, D. (2025) Determinants of anxiety, depression and subjective wellbeing among musicians in Denmark: Findings from the 'When Music Speaks' project, Scandinavian Journal of Psychology, 66(3), pp. 429–445
- Musgrave, G. & Lamis, D.A. (2025) Musicians, the music industries, and suicide: Epidemiology, risk factors and suggested prevention approaches, Frontiers in Public Health, 13:1507772, pp. 1–20
- Musgrave, G. (2025) #WeAreViable, aren't we? Music careers, state support, and the political feasibility of a Basic Income for the Arts, Cultural Trends
- Musgrave, G., Carney, D., Silver, E. & Tibber, M.S. (2025) 'Working in the Content Factory': Musicians' social media use and mental health as seen through the lens of a transdiagnostic cognitive behavioural conceptualisation, Frontiers in Psychology, 16: 1542407, pp. 1–16

== Discography ==
=== Extended plays ===
- 2008: Dialectics
- 2009: Mental Breakdown Music
- 2014: Stealing My Older Brother's Tapes
- 2014: Hindsight is the Purest Form of Romance

=== Album ===
- 2024: The England No One Cares About (Soundtrack)
