= Tremor and Other Hyperkinetic Movements =

- Discipline: Neurology
- Language: English
- Edited by: Elan Louis

Publication details
- History: 2011–present
- Publisher: Ubiquity Press
- Frequency: Continuous
- Open access: Yes
- License: CC BY

Standard abbreviations
- ISO 4: Tremor Other Hyperkinetic Mov.
- NLM: Tremor Other Hyperkinet Mov (N Y)

Indexing
- ISSN: 2160-8288
- LCCN: 2011201192
- OCLC no.: 711689502

Links
- Journal homepage; Online access; Online archive

Tremor and Other Hyperkinetic Movements is a peer-reviewed open access medical journal covering neurology with a focus on hyperkinetic movement disorders including tremor, emphasizing non-Parkinsonian disorders. The journal is published by Ubiquity Press and was established in 2011 by the current editor-in-chief, Elan Louis (University of Texas Southwestern Medical Center).

== Abstracting and indexing ==
The journal is abstracted and indexed in Embase, Emerging Sources Citation Index, and Index Medicus/MEDLINE/PubMed.
