= The Comics Grid =

The Comics Grid: Journal of Comics Scholarship
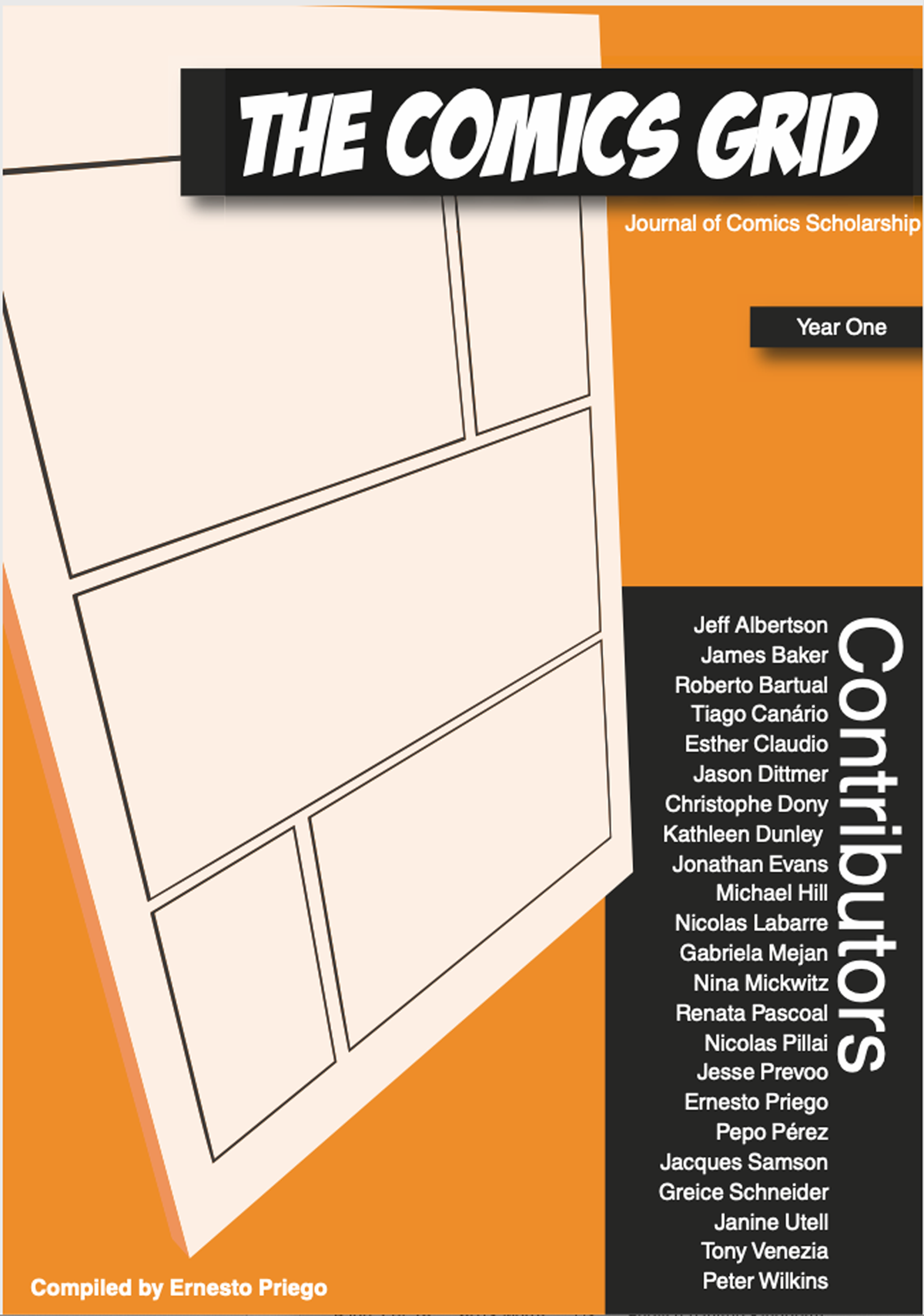
- Discipline: Comics studies
- Language: English
- Edited by: Ernesto Priego, Peter Wilkins

Publication details
- Former name: The Comics Grid
- History: 2011–present
- Publisher: Open Library of Humanities
- Frequency: Continuous
- Open access: Yes
- License: CC BY

Standard abbreviations
- ISO 4: Comics Grid

Indexing
- ISSN: 2048-0792
- OCLC no.: 939219237

Links
- Journal homepage; Online access; Online archive

The Comics Grid: Journal of Comics Scholarship is a peer-reviewed open access academic journal covering comics studies. The journal also publishes scholarly articles in comics form.

== History ==
The project was originally conceived between 2009 and 2010 by comics scholars Roberto Bartual, Esther Claudio, Ernesto Priego, Greice Schneider, and Tony Venezia as a peer-reviewed comics studies blog. It became an open access peer-reviewed journal in 2013, published by Ubiquity Press. Since 2015 the journal is published by the Open Library of Humanities.

== Abstracting and indexing ==
The journal is abstracted and indexed by the Modern Language Association Database, Scopus, and the Emerging Sources Citation Index.

== Side publications ==
The Comics Grid. Journal of Comics Scholarship. Year One is an open access 292-page ebook compilation of the journal's first volume of peer-reviewed short articles which were originally published on the Comics Grid WordPress platform between January 2011 and January 2012.

== Webinar Series ==
The Comics Grid Webinar Series are online panels where two authors talk about their articles published recently in the journal. The webinars are live and the recordings are made available via YouTube.

== Reception ==
The journal is included in the listing of journals at ComicsResearch.org and New York University Libraries' guide for students and researchers interested in comics and graphic novels.

A 2013 Working Paper from the Creativity, Regulation, Enterprise and Technology Research Centre University of Glasgow, titled "Writing About Comics and Copyright", focuses on the journal as a case study.

In 2017, the journal was nominated for a Digital Humanities Award in the Public Engagement category.

In 2018, two editors of the journal received an Open Scholarship Award 2018 Honorable Mention for their work advancing open access in comics studies.
