= Continuity In Education =

Academic journal

Continuity in Education
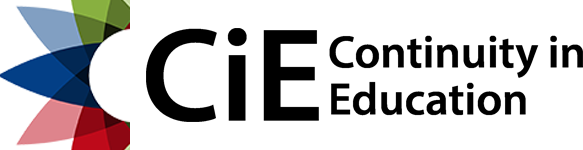
- Discipline: Education, developmental psychology
- Language: English
- Edited by: Michele Capurso

Publication details
- History: 2020–present
- Publisher: Ubiquity Press
- Frequency: Continuous
- Open access: Yes
- License: Creative Commons Attribution Non Commercial Non Derivatives 3.0 Unported License

Standard abbreviations
- ISO 4: Contin. Educ.

Indexing
- ISSN: 2631-9179
- OCLC no.: 1246501282

Links
- Journal homepage; Online archive

Continuity in Education is a peer-reviewed open access academic journal. It is published by Ubiquity Press and covers education theories, pedagogy, developmental psychology, and topics connected to the education and development of children and young people with health care needs.

== Abstracting and indexing ==
The journal is abstracted and indexed in DOAJ, ERIH Plus, and Scopus.

== History ==
The journal was announced in 2019 as a joint effort by four organizations: HEAL, HELP, HOPE, and REDLACEH, with NAHE joining the consortium in 2022. The first article was published in January 2020 with Michele Capurso (Università degli Studi di Perugia) as founding editor-in-chief.
