= Charly "Carlos" Palmer =

American fine artist and illustrator

Charly Palmer
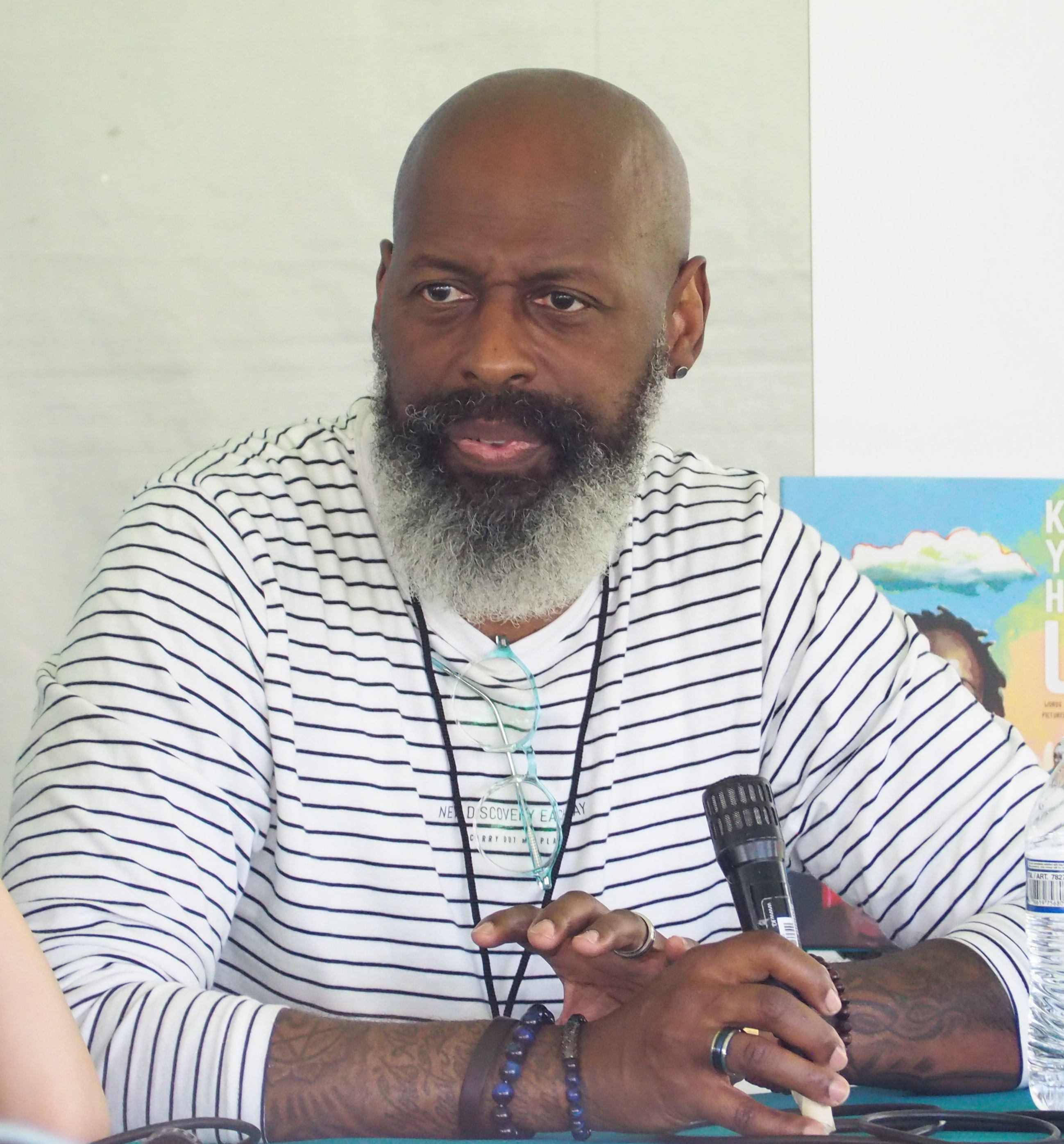
- Charly Palmer in 2022
- Born: Charly Carlos Palmer; June 29, 1960 (age 66); Fayette, Alabama
- Education: SAIC; American Academy of Art
- Known for: Illustration, graphic design, fine art
- Notable work: Cover art for John Legend's Bigger Love; Time magazine cover Mama Africa!: How Miriam Makeba Spread Hope with Her Song
- Awards: 2018 Coretta Scott King/John Steptoe New Talent Award, the 2024 Texas Bluebonnet Award, the 2024 NAACP Image Award for Outstanding Literary Work – Non-Fiction, and the 2024 Boston Globe–Horn Book Special Citation Award
- Website: www.charlypalmer.com

Charly "Carlos" Palmer (currently known as Charly Palmer) (born June 29, 1960) is an American fine artist. Palmer's subjects have included landscapes and portraits. Primarily an acrylic painter, Palmer also works in a variety of media.

== Career ==
Palmer created the 1996 Olympic Poster, and again in 1998 the US Olympic Committee honored Palmer by selecting him to paint the US Olympic Poster for the Winter Olympics in Nagano, Japan. He has mentored several artists, including Tamara Natalie Madden.

He has exhibited at the African American Museum of Southern New Jersey, Just Lookin' Gallery, Spence Gallery, and in many other museums and galleries throughout the country.

Following his mother's death in 2008, Palmer began frequently including flowers in his imagery.

Palmer was the 2018 recipient of the Coretta Scott King/John Steptoe Illustrator Award for the book Mama Africa!: How Miriam Makeba Spread Hope with Her Song, written by Kathryn Erskine.

Since then, Palmer has illustrated for children's books such as The Teachers March! How Selma's Teachers Changed History by Sandra Wallace, My Rainy Day Rocket Ship by Markette Sheppard, There's a Dragon in My Closet by Dorothea Taylor, and I Can Write the World by Joshunda Sanders. He also created the cover art for the books All Boys Aren't Blue: A Memoir-Manifesto by George M. Johnson, and severl books by his wife, Karida L. Brown, including The Battle for the Black Mind, Gone Home: Race and Roots Through Appalachia, and The Sociology of W. E. B. Du Bois: Racialized Modernity and the Global Color Line by Brown with and José Itzigsohn. Palmer also co-authored The New Brownies Book: A Love Letter To Black Families which won the 2024 NAACP Image Award in Outstanding Literary Work – Non-Fiction.

Palmer spoke at UCLA in November 2019 as one of the Regents Lecturers for the African American Studies Department about artists impacts on protests.

In 2020, Palmer illustrated the cover art work for John Legend's studio album Bigger Love.

As a part of the Black Lives Matter movement, Palmer was selected to do the July 2020 cover for the acclaimed Time magazine for the "America Must Change" issue. Several other illustrations were included in the issue, including portraits of George Stinney and James Baldwin paired with American iconography. The paintings were received as both beautiful and mournful. Palmer was chosen to work on the cover based on his 20 years of experience painting on the subject of race. Also in relation to BLM, Palmer's piece "Speak with Confidence" was posted by celebrities online and gained media attention.

== Personal life ==
Palmer was born in Fayette, Alabama, and raised in Milwaukee, Wisconsin. He attended the School of the Art Institute of Chicago and receiving a degree from the American Academy of Art.

He and Brown married in 2020, and the two are currently based in Atlanta, Georgia, with their two pugs, Brownie and Blu.

Palmer teaches at Spelman College in Atlanta, Georgia in addition to his working on his original art.
