= Glossa (journal) =

- Discipline: General linguistics
- Language: English
- Edited by: Gabriel Martinez Vera, Lyn Tieu

Publication details
- History: 2016–present
- Publisher: Open Library of Humanities
- Frequency: Continuous
- Open access: Yes
- License: CC-BY 4.0
- Impact factor: 0.8 (2024)

Standard abbreviations
- ISO 4: Glossa

Indexing
- ISSN: 2397-1835
- OCLC no.: 967239337

Links
- Journal homepage; Online access; Online archive

Glossa: A Journal of General Linguistics is a peer-reviewed open access academic journal covering general linguistics. It was established in 2016. The journal is published by the Open Library of Humanities and the editors-in-chief are Gabriel Martinez Vera (Newcastle University) and Lyn Tieu (University of Toronto)

== History ==
In October 2015, the editors and editorial board of Lingua resigned en masse to protest their inability to come to an agreement with Elsevier regarding fair pricing models for open access publishing. They subsequently started a new journal, while Elsevier continued publishing Lingua with new editors and a new editorial board. The original editorial board of Lingua was supported in their protest by the Association of Public and Land-grant Universities, the Association of Research Libraries, the American Association of State Colleges and Universities, the American Council on Education, the Canadian Association of Research Libraries, the Confederation of Open Access Repositories, Educause, and the Scholarly Publishing and Academic Resources Coalition. In 2016, the journal was hosted by Ubiquity Press and funded by the Vereniging van Universiteiten and the Dutch Research Council. In 2021, the journal switched for the Open Library of Humanities.

== Abstracting and indexing ==
The journal is abstracted and indexed in:

- Arts & Humanities Citation Index
- Current Contents/Arts & Humanities
- Current Contents/Social and Behavioral Sciences
- Linguistic Bibliography
- Linguistics & Language Behavior Abstracts
- Modern Language Association
- Scopus
- Social Sciences Citation Index

According to the Journal Citation Reports, the journal has a 2024 impact factor of 0.8.
