= Krishan Kumar =

Krishan Kumar may refer to:

- Krishan Kumar (actor), Indian film actor and producer
- Krishan Kumar (athlete) (born 1997), Indian athlete
- Krishan Kumar (sociologist) (born 1942), British-Indian sociologist
- Krishan Kumar (police officer)
- Krishan Kumar (Bawal politician)
- Krishan Kumar (Narwana politician)
- Krishan Kumar Aggarwal, Indian academic
- Krishan Kumar Kaushal, Indian politician
- Krishan Kumar Menon (1968–2022), Indian singer better known as K. K.
- Krishan Kumar Modi (1940–2019), Indian businessman
- Krishan Kumar Singh, Indian politician
