= International Labour Review =

- Discipline: Economics, labour law, industrial relations, social policy, sociology, history
- Language: English, French, Spanish
- Edited by: Aristea Koukiadaki

Publication details
- History: 1921–present
- Publisher: Open Library of Humanities on behalf of the International Labour Organization.
- Frequency: Quarterly
- Impact factor: 1.5 (2022)

Standard abbreviations
- ISO 4: Int. Labour Rev.

Indexing
- ISSN: 0020-7780 (print); 1564-913X (web)

Links
- Journal homepage; Online access; Online archive

The International Labour Review is a quarterly peer-reviewed academic journal covering labour and employment studies. It was established in 1921 by the International Labour Organization and is published in English, French, and Spanish. On April 7, 2025, the journal officially transitioned to open access and publication by the Open Library of Humanities, from previous publisher Wiley.
