= Help Musicians =

UK charitable organization

Help Musicians (formerly Musicians Benevolent Fund), is a United Kingdom charity offering help for musicians throughout their careers.

== History ==
It was created by Victor Beigel in 1921 as the Gervase Elwes Memorial Fund, following the death of English tenor Gervase Elwes. It was renamed as the Musicians Benevolent Fund in 1926 and became a registered charity. Until his death in 1934, Edward Elgar was the fund's president.

During World War II the fund was supported by proceeds from daily concerts in the National Gallery, London, organized by Myra Hess.

Help Musicians launched Music Minds Matter in 2017, after work led by George Musgrave. This was the first 24/7 mental health helpline for musicians.

=== Covid-19 pandemic response ===
When the UK went into lockdown in March 2020 due to the COVID-19 pandemic, Help Musicians launched its Coronavirus Hardship Fund to support musicians who were struggling financially due to loss of work. After distributing the first round of one-off grants to musicians facing immediate difficulties, a second fund of £2.5m was exhausted in just five days in June 2020 due to the volume of applications.

Help Musicians also undertook research into how the pandemic affected musicians' mental health, finding 87% of the 700 musicians surveyed reported their mental health had deteriorated, and 24% going so far as to say they were considering leaving the profession for good due to the combined effect of the pandemic and Brexit. In response to this mental health crisis, the charity announced an expansion of its Music Minds Matter service—whose flagship helpline had seen a 65% increase in calls—by setting up a national network of local support groups, and introducing targeted signposting to help musicians find the most relevant support and advice.

== Purpose ==
It supports working musicians who are dealing with an illness, injury or accident. It gives financial grants to pay for medical treatment, specialist therapies and living costs and provides one-on-one help to those with life-changing situations. It also provides regular payments and social visits to retired musicians.

Help Musicians also supports emerging and graduate musicians. The programme offers funding awards to postgraduate musicians undertaking advanced training, and also helps with short-term treatment costs for music students experiencing health problems.

Amongst the awards they offer, they administer the Peter Whittingham Jazz Award (started in 1989), a £5,000 award for an emerging jazz musician or group to undertake a creative project of their choice, that will support their professional development.

An annual concert in support of the fund is given in London on or near St. Cecilia's Day. In 2014, the charity spent £3.3 million in support of more than 5,000 musicians.
