= Alvin Gouldner =

American sociologist and social theorist (1920–1980)

Alvin Ward Gouldner
- Born: July 29, 1920; New York City, US
- Died: December 15, 1980 (aged 60); Madrid, Spain
- Known for: Reflexive sociology Culture of Critical Discourse ”New Class” theory

Academic background
- Education: Baruch College; Columbia University
- Thesis: Industry and Bureaucracy (1954)
- Doctoral advisor: Robert K. Merton

Academic work
- Discipline: Sociologist
- Institutions: University at Buffalo; Antioch College; University of Illinois Urbana-Champaign; Washington University in St. Louis; University of Amsterdam

Alvin Ward Gouldner (July 29, 1920 – December 15, 1980) was an American sociologist and social theorist. Trained under Robert K. Merton at Columbia University, he began his career in industrial sociology with two studies of a gypsum plant, Patterns of Industrial Bureaucracy (1954) and Wildcat Strike (1954), that became foundational texts in the sociology of organizations.

Gouldner’s most widely read work, The Coming Crisis of Western Sociology (1970), argued that American sociology was in crisis and called for a “reflexive sociology” that would subject sociologists’ own assumptions to critical scrutiny. In a subsequent series of books published under the general title “The Dark Side of the Dialectic,” he developed the concept of the “Culture of Critical Discourse” and argued that a “New Class” of intellectuals and technical professionals was emerging as a historically significant force. Gouldner termed this class a “flawed universal class”, contending that it claimed to speak for humanity while pursuing its own interests. He also founded the journal Theory and Society in 1974.

Gouldner spent most of his career at Washington University in St. Louis, where he held the Max Weber Research Professorship of Social Theory, with a period at the University of Amsterdam (1972–1976). He died of a heart attack in Madrid at the age of 60.

== Early life and education ==
Gouldner was born in New York City. He earned a Bachelor of Business Administration from Baruch College and went on to receive M.A. (1945) and Ph.D. (1953) degrees from Columbia University, where he trained under Robert K. Merton. Merton’s influence oriented him toward the Columbia school of industrial sociology, a field that had grown substantially from the Hawthorne experiments of the late 1920s and early 1930s.

== Career ==
While finishing his doctorate, Gouldner held a succession of positions: resident sociologist at the American Jewish Committee (1945–1947), assistant professor at the University at Buffalo (1947–1951), consulting sociologist at Standard Oil of New Jersey (1951–1952), and associate professor at Antioch College (1952–1954). During this period he conducted the fieldwork at a gypsum plant in upstate New York that would form the basis of his two early monographs, Patterns of Industrial Bureaucracy (1954) and Wildcat Strike (1954).

After a period at the University of Illinois Urbana-Champaign, Gouldner joined the joint Department of Anthropology and Sociology at Washington University in St. Louis in 1957, becoming professor and chair in 1959. In 1968 he was appointed to the endowed Max Weber Research Professorship of Social Theory.

Through the late 1950s and into the 1960s, Gouldner began shifting from empirical industrial sociology toward theoretical critique. His 1960 article “The Norm of Reciprocity,” published in the American Sociological Review, became one of the most frequently cited articles in sociology. His 1962 essay “Anti-Minotaur: The Myth of Value-Free Sociology” marked a more public break with the positivist mainstream, arguing that a fully value-free sociology was neither achievable nor desirable, and that Max Weber’s position had been misread by later sociologists.

The Coming Crisis of Western Sociology (1970) brought Gouldner to attention beyond the discipline. In it he argued that American sociology was entering a period of crisis brought on by its own internal contradictions, its uncritical service to liberal welfare-state institutions, and the rebellion of younger radical scholars against the dominant functionalist paradigm. The book inaugurated what Gouldner called “reflexive sociology”, in which he demanded that sociologists subject their own assumptions and social positions to the same critical scrutiny they applied to their objects of study.

Gouldner subsequently held a professorship at the University of Amsterdam before returning to Washington University, where he continued work on a projected multi-volume study of ideology, intellectuals, and Marxism. The first volume, The Dialectic of Ideology and Technology (1976), was followed by The Future of Intellectuals and the Rise of the New Class (1979) and The Two Marxisms (1980). These works argued that a “New Class” of technical intelligentsia and humanistic intellectuals had emerged as a historically significant force, though one defined by its “flawed universalism”, since it claimed to speak for humanity while pursuing its own class interests. A posthumous volume, Against Fragmentation (1985), was completed from his manuscripts by his wife Janet Gouldner and colleague Cornelis Disco.

Gouldner died of a heart attack at age 60 in Madrid on December 15, 1980, while on a European lecture tour.

== Legacy and reception ==
Gouldner’s influence on sociology was broad but diffuse. His call for reflexive sociology became part of the discipline’s general self-understanding rather than generating a distinct school of followers, and his specific formulations were largely overtaken by later theorists, most notably Pierre Bourdieu, whose concept of reflexivity differed from Gouldner’s in important respects. By the 1990s, C. Wright Mills rather than Gouldner had become the figure more commonly invoked by sociologists seeking a model of engaged scholarship. Pedraza argues that Gouldner’s difficult personality contributed to this decline, by alienating him from the scholarly community and preventing him from generating students who could carry his work forward.

Nonetheless, the intellectual issues Gouldner engaged—the limits of value-free inquiry, the relationship between social theory and politics, and the need for reflexivity—have continued to attract scholarly attention. Anthony Giddens assessed Gouldner’s work at length in “Social Theory and Modern Sociology“ (1987), and a 1982 memorial issue of Theory and Society argued that problems widely debated among social theorists at that time—particularly the effort to transcend the classical subject–object dichotomy—had been tackled by Gouldner a generation before Foucault, Bourdieu, and Giddens themselves took up the same question. A 2002 special issue of The Sociological Quarterly further reassessed his legacy, with contributions arguing that his work constituted “a sociology for our times” and that his 1965 study “Enter Plato“, long overshadowed by “The Coming Crisis“, represented a pioneering contribution to the sociology of ideas that successfully answered Merton’s earlier call for work bridging the theory–research divide in the sociology of knowledge.

His 1960 article “The Norm of Reciprocity,” which argued that the obligation to return benefits received functions as a universal moral norm underpinning social stability, became one of the most cited articles in the history of sociology and has continued to generate research across social psychology, organizational behavior, and related fields. Gouldner himself later reflected that the article’s frequent citation owed in part to its anticipation of the shift away from functionalist orthodoxy that would define the following decade.

Theory and Society, which Gouldner founded in 1974, operated for nearly fifty years, with his wife, Janet Gouldner, serving as executive editor for decades. In late 2023, Springer Nature replaced the journal’s editorial leadership. When several former editors subsequently launched a new open-access journal, Theory and Social Inquiry, they explicitly described it as a continuation of the project Gouldner had begun.

== Writings ==
=== Early industrial sociology (1954) ===
Based on fieldwork at a gypsum plant in upstate New York, Patterns of Industrial Bureaucracy identified three distinct patterns by which workplace rules are established and enforced. In mock bureaucracy, rules imposed from outside are ignored by both management and workers. In representative bureaucracy, rules are mutually endorsed and enforced with little conflict. In punishment-centered bureaucracy, rules are imposed by one party and resisted by the other, generating ongoing tension. The book is considered a foundational text in the sociology of organizations.

The companion volume, Wildcat Strike, examined an unauthorized work stoppage at the same plant. Gouldner argued that when management abruptly overturned informal workplace expectations, like reassigning supervisors or speeding up machinery, workers responded with demands outside the formal grievance structure, producing a self-reinforcing cycle of conflict. Together the two books demonstrated the limits of purely formal accounts of bureaucratic authority and established Gouldner’s reputation in industrial sociology.

=== The Coming Crisis of Western Sociology (1970) ===
The Coming Crisis of Western Sociology argued that American sociology was entering a period of crisis brought on by its own internal contradictions, its uncritical service to liberal welfare-state institutions, and the rebellion of younger radical scholars against the dominant functionalist paradigm. The book brought Gouldner to wide attention beyond the discipline.

The book’s concluding section set out what Gouldner called “reflexive sociology”: the demand that sociologists turn the same critical scrutiny on their own assumptions and social positions that they applied to their objects of study. A reflexive social theory, in Gouldner’s formulation, would take into account not only external forces shaping intellectual life but also the internal social organization and subculture of intellectuals themselves. Central to this program was his recurring question about the position of the theorist in relation to what is being observed, which he framed as asking where “the cameraman” fits in.

=== “The Dark Side of the Dialectic” (1976–1985) ===
Gouldner conceived his final major project as a multi-volume study of ideology, intellectuals, and Marxism under the general title “The Dark Side of the Dialectic.” Three volumes appeared in his lifetime, followed by a posthumous fourth completed from his manuscripts by his wife Janet Gouldner and colleague Cornelis Disco.

==== The Dialectic of Ideology and Technology (1976) ====
The first volume of the project examined ideology and social science as post-traditional symbol systems that arose in response to the crisis of traditional authority. The volume introduced what Gouldner termed the “Culture of Critical Discourse” (CCD): a mode of speech and thought in which claims are justified by argument and evidence rather than by the speaker’s social position or inherited authority.

Gouldner identified a tension within CCD that he considered fundamental. He argued that CCD’s reflexivity about the grounds of speech was a source of emancipatory potential, but its insistence on context-free rules also produced rigidity—what he called its “dark side.” This included a tendency toward inflexibility across concrete contexts and a tendency to obscure the social position of the speaker behind the impersonal form of the discourse. The tension between the critical and the objectivizing tendencies of rational discourse became a central preoccupation of the subsequent volumes.

==== The Future of Intellectuals and the Rise of the New Class (1979) ====
The second volume argued that a “New Class” of technical intelligentsia and humanistic intellectuals had emerged as a historically significant force. What unified this otherwise diverse group, in Gouldner’s account, was their shared possession of “cultural capital” acquired through education and expressed through the Culture of Critical Discourse. This cultural capital enabled them to challenge both the bureaucratic elites of state socialism and the owners of financial capital in the West.

Gouldner characterized this New Class as a “flawed universal class.” He argued that, because its power would be grounded in theoretical knowledge, it would carry the most universal claim for legitimacy of any class in history. At the same time, the New Class, like any other historical agent, pursued its own interests, and its universalism was therefore fundamentally compromised. He described the New Class as potentially the most progressive force in modern society, while insisting that its progressive character could not be taken on faith.

Szelenyi and Martin placed Gouldner’s theory within a century-long tradition of “New Class” theorizing and assessed it as the most comprehensive of the knowledge-class theories of the 1900s. Critics objected that the phenomenon of middle-class radicalism it reflected upon was already in decline, and that the concept of “class” was poorly suited to the phenomenon Gouldner was describing. Lemert and Piccone noted that the New Class theory represented an uncharacteristic turn toward objectivism in Gouldner’s otherwise voluntarist thought.

==== The Two Marxisms (1980) ====
The third volume distinguished two recurring tendencies within the Marxist tradition. In Gouldner’s categorization, “Scientific Marxism” emphasized objective laws of historical development, structural determination, and the primacy of economic forces, while “Critical Marxism” emphasized subjective agency, moral commitment, and the possibility of conscious political action. Gouldner traced Scientific Marxism through the later Engels, Kautsky, and the Second International, and Critical Marxism through the early Lukács, Gramsci, and the Frankfurt School.

While presenting the distinction analytically, Gouldner favored the Critical tendency because he believed social life is irreducibly indeterminate, meaning that neither structure nor will can be assessed independently of their encounter with each other. He noted particular admiration for the early Lukács of ‘’History and Class Consciousness“, whose insistence on totality as the fundamental category of social analysis Gouldner regarded as the origin of modern Critical Marxism.

==== Against Fragmentation (1985) ====
The posthumous fourth volume examined the origins of Marxism in relation to the sociology of intellectuals. It was assembled from Gouldner’s manuscripts after his death in 1980.
