= Architectural Histories =

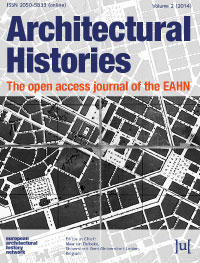
- Discipline: History of architecture
- Language: English
- Edited by: Samantha L. Martin

Publication details
- History: 2013–present
- Publisher: Ubiquity Press (United Kingdom)
- Open access: Yes
- License: Creative Commons Attribution License

Indexing
- ISSN: 2050-5833

Links
- Journal homepage

Architectural Histories is a peer-reviewed open access scholarly journal publishing historically grounded research into all aspects of architecture and the built environment, since 2013. It is published on behalf of the European Architectural History Network (EAHN), with Ubiquity Press. The current editor-in-chief is Samantha L. Martin.

== Abstracting and indexing ==
The journal is abstracted and indexed in:

- Scopus
- DOAJ
- Emerging Sources Citation Index
- ERIH PLUS
- Avery Index to Architectural Periodicals

== See also ==
- List of architecture magazines
