= Bigger Love =

- Digital version and stylized graphics colors of lighter green instead of dark green.

Studio album by John Legend
- Released: June 19, 2020
- Studios: Sucasa (Los Angeles); The Village (Los Angeles); Blakeslee (North Hollywood); Barham (Los Angeles); State of the Ark (London); Patriot (Los Angeles); DiGenius (Burbank); Chalice (Los Angeles); Melrose (Los Angeles); Elysian Park (Los Angeles); House of the Setting Sun (Twentynine Palms); Arcade (New York); Record Plant (Los Angeles)
- Length: 55:51
- Label: Columbia
- Producers: Anderson .Paak; Camper; Cautious Clay; Di Genius; Digi; Jeff "Gitty" Gitelman; Eric Hudson; Mr Hudson; Jonas W. Karlsson; Lias; Nate Mercereau; Oak; The Orphanage; Pom Pom; Charlie Puth; Ricky Reed; Zach Skelton; Ryan Tedder; TMS; Greg Wattenberg; Greg Wells

John Legend chronology
A Legendary Christmas (2018)	Bigger Love (2020)	Legend (2022)

Singles from Bigger Love
- 1. "Conversations in the Dark" Released: January 10, 2020; 2. "Actions" Released: March 20, 2020; 3. "Bigger Love" Released: April 17, 2020; 4. "Wild" Released: August 13, 2020

Bigger Love is the eighth studio album by American singer-songwriter and musician John Legend. It was released on June 19, 2020, through Columbia Records. The album includes the singles "Conversations in the Dark", "Actions", "Bigger Love", and "Wild". The album won the Grammy Award for Best R&B Album at the 63rd Annual Grammy Awards. The album was further promoted by a limited North American tour leg that began on September 1, 2021, after several stops on the original US and UK tour itinerary were either postponed or canceled due to the COVID-19 pandemic.

== Background ==
Bigger Love was written mostly in 2019. Recording for the album finished in February 2020. Legend stated he hoped the album would bring joy and be uplifting in light of the George Floyd protests that were taking place during the album's release. He released the cover art and track listing on June 12, a week before the release.

== Artwork ==
The cover art was painted by artist Charly "Carlos" Palmer. The piece features a smiling portrait of the singer-songwriter covered in blooming flowers and a starry sky against a pop of turquoise backdrop.

== Singles ==
Three singles were put out before the album was released. "Conversations in the Dark" was released on January 10, 2020. "Actions" was released on March 20. Legend performed "Actions" on The Tonight Show. The title track, "Bigger Love", was released on April 17, 2020. "Wild", a collaboration with American musician Gary Clark Jr., was released on August 13, 2020.

== Critical reception ==
Professional ratings
Aggregate scores
Source	Rating
Metacritic	59/100
Review scores
Source	Rating
Clash	6/10
The Guardian	2/5 stars
Rolling Stone	3.5/5 stars
Pitchfork	(6.4/10)
The Independent	4/5 stars

The album received generally mixed reviews from critics. Rolling Stone rated the album 3.5/5 stars, stating that the album's "self-aware" themes fit well with the current environment of the COVID-19 pandemic. Rated R&B recognized the album on its 30 Best R&B Albums of 2020 list, stating, "Bigger Love celebrates everlasting love as John Legend serenades with soothing falsettos, bold instrumentation, and groovy new sounds."

== Track listing ==
No.	Title	Writer(s)	Producer(s)	Length
1.	"Ooh Laa"	John Stephens; Warren Felder; Alex Niceforo; Keith Sorrells; Trey Campbell; Al Dubin; Harry Warren	Oak; The Orphanage; Alex Nice^{[c]}; Ten4^{[c]}	2:59
2.	"Actions"	Stephens; Felder; Niceforo; Sorrells; Cautious Clay; Coleridge Tillman; David Axelrod	Oak; The Orphanage; Nice^{[c]}; Ten4^{[c]}; Cautious Clay^{[c]}	2:54
3.	"I Do"	Stephens; Charlie Puth	Puth; Raphael Saadiq^{[c]}	2:47
4.	"One Life"	Stephens; Anderson .Paak; Jeff "Gitty" Gitelman; Cautious Clay	Anderson .Paak; Gitelman	3:14
5.	"Wild" (featuring Gary Clark Jr.)	Stephens; Tom Barnes; Pete Kelleher; Ben Kohn; Jake Torrey; Sam Roman	TMS	3:16
6.	"Bigger Love"	Stephens; Ryan Tedder; Cautious Clay; Zach Skelton	Tedder; Skelton; Cautious Clay; Di Genius	2:50
7.	"U Move, I Move" (featuring Jhené Aiko)	Stephens; Campbell; Michael Gregory Bywaters; Jonas W. Karlsson	Karlsson	3:43
8.	"Favorite Place"	Stephens; Jamil Chammas; Julia Michaels	Digi; Oak^{[c]}; The Orphanage^{[c]}	2:48
9.	"Slow Cooker"	Stephens; Campbell; Elias Näslin; Toluwanimi Adeyemo	Lias; Saadiq^{[c]}	4:22
10.	"Focused"	Stephens; Eric Frederic; Nate Mercereau; Wayne Hector; Teddy Geiger	Ricky Reed; Mercereau; Steve Wyreman^{[a]}	3:02
11.	"Conversations in the Dark"	Stephens; Gregg Wattenberg; Jesse Fink; Kellen Pomeranz; Chance Peña	Wattenberg; Pom Pom	3:55
12.	"Don't Walk Away" (featuring Koffee)	Stephens; Kirby Lauryen; Stephen McGregor; Mikyala Simpson	Di Genius	3:40
13.	"Remember Us" (featuring Rapsody)	Stephens; Eric Hudson; Danny "Ezra" Murdock; Curtis Hudson; Marlanna Evans; Campbell; Al Green; Al Jackson, Jr.; Willie Mitchell	E. Hudson; Murdock^{[a]}	4:51
14.	"I'm Ready" (featuring Camper)	Stephens; Tayla Parx; Darhyl Camper, Jr.	Camper	3:51
15.	"Always"	Stephens; Ester Dean; Camper; Justus Alexander West	Camper; West^{[a]}; Branden Rowell^{[a]}	3:26
16.	"Never Break"	Stephens; Benjamin "Mr Hudson" McIldowie; Nasri Atweh; Greg Wells	Mr Hudson; Wells; Benjamin Rice^{[v]}	4:13
Total length:				55:51

Japan bonus tracks
No.	Title	Writer(s)	Producer(s)	Length
17.	"Conversations in the Dark" (John Legend vs. David Guetta)	Stephens; Wattenberg; Fink; Pomeranz; Peña; David Guetta; Giorgio Tuinfort	Wattenberg; Pom Pom; Guetta^{[r]}	3:30
18.	"Bigger Love (Remix)" (featuring Mau y Ricky)	Stephens; Tedder; Cautious Clay; Skelton; Juan Morelli; Mau Montaner; Ricky Montaner	Tedder; Skelton; Cautious Clay; Di Genius; Jon Leone^{[v]}	3:22
Total length:				62:55

=== Notes ===
- ^{^[a]}signifies an additional producer
- ^{^[c]}signifies a co-producer
- ^{^[v]}signifies a vocal producer
- ^{^[r]}signifies a remixer
- "Ooh Laa" contains a portion of "I Only Have Eyes for You", written by Al Dubin and Harry Warren.
- "Actions" contains a sample from "The Edge", written by David Axelrod and performed by David McCallum.
- "Remember Us" contains a portion of "I'm Still in Love with You" written by Al Green, Al Jackson, Jr., and Willie Mitchell.

== Personnel ==
=== Musicians ===
- John Legend – lead vocals (all tracks), background vocals (tracks 1–4, 8, 9, 11–15), piano (4, 15), additional keyboards (4)
- Oak – additional background vocals (track 1); background vocals, keyboards, drum programming (2)
- Alex Nice – additional background vocals (track 1); background vocals, keyboards (2)
- Keith "Ten4" Sorrells – additional background vocals (track 1); background vocals, keyboards, drum programming (2)
- Cautious Clay – background vocals (tracks 2, 6, 18), bass (2), saxophone (6, 18)
- Jamelle Adisa – horns (tracks 2, 9); horn arrangement, trumpet, fluegelhorn (13)
- Natalie Imani – background vocals (tracks 3, 4, 9, 10, 12, 13, 15), ad-lib vocals (6, 18)
- Ayana George – background vocals (tracks 3, 4, 9, 10, 12, 13, 15)
- Keri Lee – background vocals (tracks 3, 4, 9, 10, 12, 13, 15)
- Raphael Saadiq – guitar (tracks 3, 9), bass (4), additional bass (5)
- Garrison Brown – additional drums (tracks 3, 5), drums (9, 15)
- Matt Jones Orchestra – orchestra (tracks 3, 4, 7, 8, 13–15)
  - Matt Jones – string arrangement
  - Stephanie Matthews – violin
  - Caitlin Edwards – violin
  - Clayton Penrose-Whitmore – violin
  - Scott Tixier – violin
  - Drew Forde – viola
  - Tahirah Whittington – cello
- Jeff "Gitty" Gitelman – additional bass, guitar, keyboards, synthesizers, string arrangement (track 4)
- Anderson .Paak – drums (track 4)
- Pete Kelleher – background vocals, keyboards, synthesizers (track 5)
- Ben Kohn – background vocals, bass (track 5)
- Sam Roman – background vocals (track 5)
- Jake Torrey – background vocals, guitar (track 5)
- Gary Clark Jr. – guitar solo (track 5)
- Tom Barnes – drums, programming (track 5)
- Di Genius – guitar, programming (tracks 6, 18)
- Trey Campbell – background vocals (tracks 7, 9)
- Jhené Aiko – lead vocals (track 7)
- Nate Mercereau – guitar, bass, drums, keyboards, French horn, string arrangement (track 10)
- Steve Wyreman – guitar, keyboards (track 10)
- Shaina Evoniuk – strings (track 10)
- Pom Pom – background vocals, bass, programming (tracks 11, 17)
- Gregg Wattenberg – background vocals, guitar, bass (tracks 11, 17)
- Jesse Fink – background vocals (tracks 11, 17)
- Chance Peña – background vocals (tracks 11, 17)
- Mia Wattenberg – background vocals (tracks 11, 17)
- Danae Greenfield – piano (tracks 11, 17)
- Benzi Ezelson – piano (tracks 11, 17)
- Koffee – lead vocals, background vocals (track 12)
- Rapsody – rap vocals (track 13)
- Scott Mayo – horn arrangement, flute, alto flute (track 13)
- Danny "Ezra" Murdock – live drums, drum programming (track 13)
- Eric Hudson – additional instrumentation (track 13)
- Peter Lee Johnson – additional strings (track 13)
- Curtis Hudson – guitar (track 13)
- Camper – background vocals (track 14)
- Tayla Parx – background vocals (track 14)
- Dmitry Gorodetsky – upright bass (track 14)
- Greg Wells – piano, Hammond organ (track 16)
- Mr Hudson – programming, string arrangement, percussion, guitar (track 16)
- Nasri Atweh – background vocals (track 16)
- Mau Montaner – lead vocals (track 18)
- Ricky Montaner – lead vocals (track 18)

=== Technical ===
- Mike Bozzi – mastering
- Gerry "The Gov" Brown – mixing (tracks 1–9, 11–18)
- Bobby Campbell – mixing (tracks 3–9, 12–15, 18)
- Ricky Reed – mixing (track 10)
- Matt Becks – mixing (tracks 11, 17)
- Greg Wells – mixing (track 16)
- Oak Felder – engineering (tracks 1, 2, 8)
- Hotae Alexander Jang – engineering (tracks 3, 4, 6, 8, 9, 12–15, 18), John Legend vocal engineering (7), additional engineering (10), engineering assistance (16)
- Jhair "Jha" Lazo – engineering (tracks 4, 6, 18)
- TMS – engineering (track 5)
- Rich Rich – engineering (tracks 6, 18)
- Lias – engineering (track 9)
- Ethan Shumaker – engineering (track 10)
- Nate Mercereau – engineering (track 10)
- Anthony Kilhoffer – engineering (tracks 11–13, 18)
- Leo Bescotti – engineering (tracks 11, 17)
- Richard Biethan – engineering (track 16)
- Tim McClain – engineering (track 18)
- Gregg Rominiecki – Jhené Aiko vocal engineering (track 7)
- Danny Johnson – mixing assistance (tracks 1, 2)
- Theo Wayland – mixing assistance (tracks 1, 2, 5)
- Sean Massih – mixing assistance (track 2)
- Kyle Metcalfe – mixing assistance (tracks 3, 4, 7, 8, 12–15)
- Keith "Ten4" Sorrells – engineering assistance (tracks 1, 8)
- Natalie Ranalli – engineering assistance (tracks 3, 4, 9, 14)
- Charlie Marshall – engineering assistance (track 16)

=== Visuals ===
- Rob English – creative direction
- Chris Feldmann – art direction, design
- Don Baker – art direction, design, hand painted signs
- Ricardo Bojorquez – design, layout
- Charly Palmer – cover and landscape painting
- Nurse Signs – hand painted signs
- Doug Inglish – photography

== Charts ==
Chart performance for Bigger Love
Chart (2020)	Peak position
Australian Albums (ARIA)	52
Canadian Albums (Billboard)	45
Dutch Albums (Album Top 100)	42
French Albums (SNEP)	179
Japanese Albums (Oricon)	165
Scottish Albums (Official Charts)	93
Swiss Albums (Schweizer Hitparade)	30
UK Albums (Official Charts)	63
UK Album Downloads (Official Charts)	5
UK R&B Albums (Official Charts)	1
US Billboard 200	19
US Top R&B/Hip-Hop Albums (Billboard)	13
