= Rosemary Hopcroft =

Australian-born American sociologist

Rosemary L. Hopcroft is an Australian-born American sociologist and Professor Emerita at the University of North Carolina at Charlotte. She is known for her work in evolutionary sociology and biosociology, gender, fertility, and comparative–historical social change. Hopcroft is the author of several books and numerous peer-reviewed articles integrating evolutionary and biosocial approaches into sociological research.

== Early life and education ==
Hopcroft was born in Adelaide, Australia. She earned a B.A. from the University of Mississippi in 1985 and an M.A. (1987) and Ph.D. (1992) in sociology from the University of Washington.

== Career ==
Hopcroft joined the faculty of the University of North Carolina at Charlotte in 1994, becoming Professor in 2010. She is now Professor Emerita.

Theory and Society published an interview with Hopcroft discussing the reception of evolutionary and biosocial research in sociology and reflecting on her academic career in 2024.

Her work has been mentioned in a variety of media outlets, including:

- The New York Times
- Scientific American
- Time magazine
- Bloomberg Opinion
- Süddeutsche Zeitung

== Publications ==
Her books include:

- Not So Weird After All: The Changing Relationship Between Status and Fertility (2024, co-author)
- The Handbook of Sex Differences (2023, co-author)
- Sociology: A Biosocial Introduction (2010; 2nd ed., 2019)
- The Oxford Handbook of Evolution, Biology & Society (2018, editor)
- Evolution and Gender (2016), winner of the ASA Evolution, Biology & Society Best Book Award
- Regions, Institutions, and Agrarian Change in European History (1999)

== Honors ==
Hopcroft received the ASA Evolution, Biology & Society Best Book Award in 2018 for Evolution and Gender. Her edited volume, The Oxford Handbook of Evolution, Biology & Society, was reviewed in Contemporary Sociology, which praised its integration of biological and sociological perspectives.
