= Tamara Natalie Madden =

Jamaican-born painter and mixed-media artist

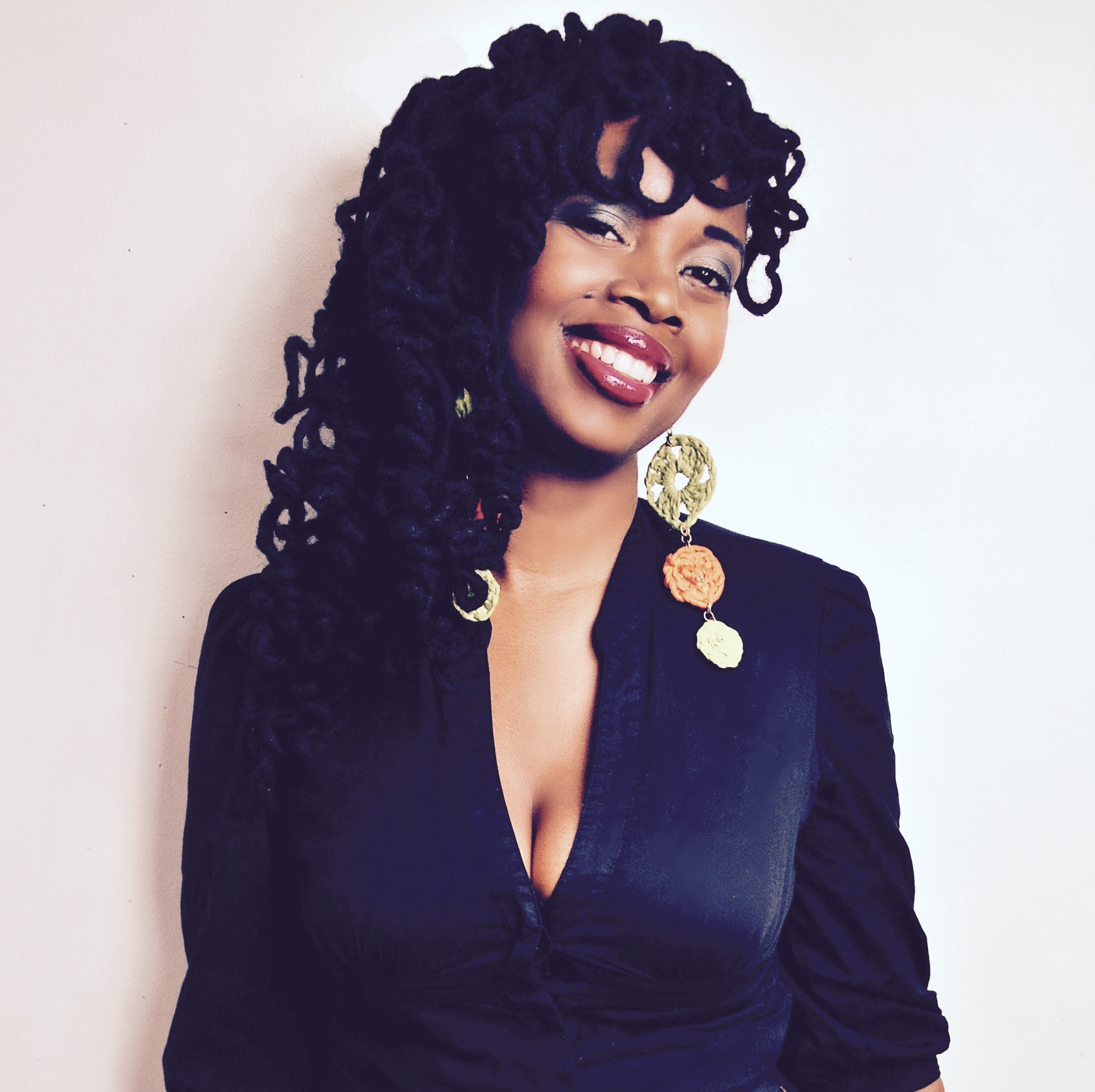
- Born: 16 August 1975
- Died: 4 November 2017 (aged 42)
- Known for: Painting, mixed media

Tamara Natalie Madden (16 August 1975 – 4 November 2017) was a Jamaican-born painter and mixed-media artist working and living in the United States. Madden's paintings are allegories whose subjects are the people of the African diaspora.

== Early life ==
Madden was born in St. Andrew, Jamaica. She moved to America from Jamaica permanently when she was an adolescent. She studied at several universities including the University of Wisconsin–Milwaukee. In 1997 Madden became ill with IgA nephropathy. While ill, Madden rediscovered art. Art helped her to heal emotionally, so she decided that it was important to pursue it further. She received a kidney transplant from her brother in 2001, and participated in her first art exhibition that same year. Her first solo exhibition was in 2004, and it garnered her an interview with the late James Auer of the Milwaukee Journal Sentinel.

== Career ==
After her solo exhibition in 2004, Madden relocated near Atlanta, Georgia. She met her mentors Charly "Carlos" Palmer and WAK (Kevin A Williams) while living in Atlanta.

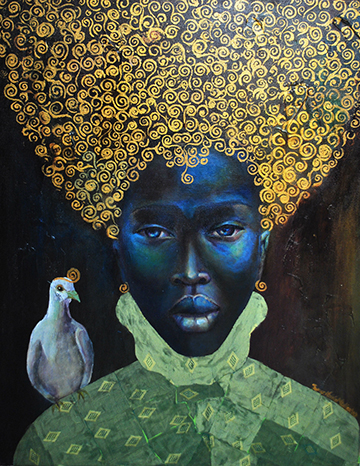
The Black Queen (2010) by Tamara Natalie Madden

Madden created images based on her memories of the people of her native Jamaica, placing them in high-status fabrics (raw silks, colorful satins, etc.), that mimicked those worn by royalty. Birds were a common theme in many of Madden's paintings, chosen as a personal symbol of her freedom from illness. Madden's influences were varied, and included Gustav Klimt, Milwaukee artist Ras Ammar Nsoroma, African royalty, Egypt, Asia, and the clothing worn by native African and Indian women. She chose to paint imagery that represented the people of the African diaspora.

"Similar to the works of Gustav Klimt, Madden clothes the goddess in a boldly patterned dress with clear ties to the arts and crafts movement and its populist underpinnings of advocating for art made by the people for the people. The unique quilting of the dress distinguishes the wearer while harkening to feelings of home and of natural, honest labor. Additionally, Madden's use of decadent colors and gold gives her subjects a life of indulgence that they never had."

Several of her pieces are in the collection of different departments at Vanderbilt University in Tennessee and also in the permanent collection of Alverno College in Milwaukee and the Charles H. Wright Museum of African American History in Detroit. Her exhibition at Syracuse University in New York yielded a positive review from the Syracuse newspaper, The Post Standard. Madden's paintings have been featured in The New York Times, The Morning News, Upscale Magazine published by Bronner Bros., the Gleaner Company, The Huffington Post, and On-Verge | Alternative Art Criticism. In 2014, Madden was named as one of 40 black artists to watch by MSNBC's The Grio.

Madden's solo exhibition at the Pittsburgh Cultural Trust garnered positive feedback from local art critics and observers. Her exhibition entitled, Out of Many, One (the Jamaican motto) sought to expand the visual repertoire of viewers and their perceptions of Jamaica and its people. "Ms. Madden's recasting of the poor and neglected may remind an observer of Kehinde Wiley's regal portraits of inner-city black men, currently on exhibit at the Brooklyn Museum. What distinguishes Ms. Madden's work, however, is the specific focus on Jamaica." Madden's work was featured at Art Basel Miami with Mocada Museum and International Visions Gallery. In an interview with Okay Africa, Madden, and several other artists talked about the inspirations for their works.

== Personal life ==
Madden resided and worked in the Atlanta area and was a fine art professor at Spelman College. Two weeks after being diagnosed with stage 4 cancer, Madden died on November 4, 2017. She had one daughter. Her younger brother, Woolie Madden Jr.—a streamer, podcaster, and former member of the YouTube group Super Best Friends Play—honoured her death by getting a back tattoo based on her art.
