= George Steinmetz (academic) =

American historical sociologist (born 1957)

George Philip Steinmetz (born November 13, 1957) is the Charles Tilly Collegiate Professor of Sociology and Germanic Languages and Literatures at the University of Michigan. He has taught at the New School for Social Research, the University of Chicago, and the School for Advanced Studies in the Social Sciences (École des hautes études en sciences sociales/EHESS). He is a historical sociologist of empires, states, and cities, with a focus on modern Germany, France, and Britain and their colonies. His other main areas of research are social theory and the history and philosophy of the social sciences.

== Education ==
Steinmetz received his B.A. from Reed College in Portland, Oregon, and his Ph.D. from the University of Wisconsin with a thesis on Social Policy and the Local State: A Study of Municipal Public Assistance, Unemployment Relief, and Social Democracy in Germany, 1871–1914, written under the guidance of Erik Olin Wright, in 1987. He held a Guggenheim Fellowship (1995-1996), won the Lewis A. Coser Award for Theoretical Agenda Setting in Sociology (awarded by the American Sociological Association, 2006), and was a visiting professor at the Institute for Advanced Study in Princeton, New Jersey (2017-2018). He was also the recipient of the Siegfred Landshut Prize (awarded by the Hamburg Institute for Social Research, 2020) and was the second ever recipient of the award.

== Research ==
Steinmetz is the author of Regulating the Social: The Welfare State and Local Politics in Imperial Germany (1993) and The Devil’s Handwriting: Precoloniality and the German Colonial State in Qingdao, Samoa, and Southwest Africa (2007). The Devil's Handwriting was awarded the Barrington Moore, Jr. Award for best book in the area of comparative and historical sociology, and the Mary Douglas Award for best book, awarded by the Culture Section of the American Sociological Association. Steinmetz is also the author of The Colonial Origins of Modern Social Thought: French Sociology and the Overseas Empire (2023), which "examines the nexus of colonialism and empire in the writings of dozens of French social scientists."

He is the editor of State/Culture (1999); The Politics of Method in the Human Sciences (2005), and Sociology and Empire (Duke, 2013). He co-directed and co-produced a 92-minute documentary film “Detroit: Ruin of a City” (2012) with Michael Chanan. Steinmetz is also editor, with Didier Fassin, of The Social Sciences in the Looking Glass: Studies in the Production of Knowledge (2023), a compilation of studies concerning the development of the social sciences from a reflexive viewpoint.

Steinmetz has published widely in journals such as the American Sociological Review, American Journal of Sociology, Comparative Studies in Society and History, Sociological Theory, Social Science History, and The Journal of Modern History.
