= Conversations in the Dark =

2020 single by John Legend

- David Guetta remix cover

Single by John Legend (solo or with David Guetta)

from the album Bigger Love
- Released: January 10, 2020
- Label: Columbia Records; Sony Music
- Songwriters: John Stephens; Chance Peña; Jesse Fink; Gregg Wattenberg; Kellen “Pom Pom” Pomeranz
- Producers: Gregg Wattenberg; Pom Pom

John Legend singles chronology
"Happy Xmas (War Is Over)" (2019)	"Conversations in the Dark" (2020)	"Actions" (2020)

David Guetta singles chronology
"Make It to Heaven" (2019)	"Conversations in the Dark" (2020)	"Detroit 3 AM" (2020)

"Conversations in the Dark" is a song by American singer and songwriter John Legend. It was released as a single on January 10, 2020, by Columbia Records and Sony Music as the lead single from his seventh studio album Bigger Love. A remix of the song with French DJ David Guetta was released on February 14, 2020.

== Track listing ==
Digital download
No.	Title	Length
1.	"Conversations in the Dark"	3:57
2.	"Conversations in the Dark" (John Legend vs. David Guetta)	3:30

Digital download – John Legend x Lindsey Stirling: The Violin Remixes
No.	Title	Length
1.	"Conversations in the Dark" (Violin Remix)	3:42
2.	"All of Me" (Violin Remix)	4:38

== Personnel ==
Credits adapted from Tidal.

- Gregg Wattenberg – producer, composer, lyricist, background vocal, bass, guitar
- Pom Pom – producer, background vocal, bass, programmer
- Chance Peña – composer, lyricist, background vocal
- Jesse Fink – composer, lyricist, background vocal
- John Stephens – composer, lyricist, associated performer, background vocal
- Kellen Pomeranz – composer, lyricist
- David Guetta – associated performer, re-mixer
- Mia Wattenberg – background vocal
- Gerry "The Gov" Brown – mixing engineer
- Matt Becks – mixing engineer
- Benzi Edelson – piano
- Danae Greenfield – piano
- Anthony Kilhoffer – recording engineer

== Charts ==
Chart (2020–2021)	Peak position
Belgium (Ultratip Bubbling Under Flanders)	26
Hungary (Rádiós Top 40)	26
Poland (Polish Airplay Top 100)	57
US Billboard Hot 100	86
US Adult Contemporary (Billboard)	21
US Hot R&B/Hip-Hop Songs (Billboard)	42

== Certifications ==
Region	Certification	Certified units/sales
Australia (ARIA)	Gold	35,000^{‡}
Mexico (AMPROFON)	Gold	30,000^{‡}
New Zealand (RMNZ)	Gold	15,000^{‡}
United States (RIAA)	Gold	500,000^{‡}
^{‡} Sales+streaming figures based on certification alone.
