= Garrison Brown =

American musician

- Origin: Youngstown, Ohio, U.S.
- Genres: Gospel, R&B, hip hop, pop
- Occupations: Drummer, music producer
- Instruments: Drums, percussion
- Member of: Alicia Keys' band

Garrison Brown is an American drummer and music producer. He is a Grammy Award winner, having contributed to John Legend's 2020 album Bigger Love. As of 2024, he is a session musician for Alicia Keys, with whom he is also touring. Aside from drumming, he also plays trumpet.

== Early life ==
Brown grew up in Youngstown, Ohio, and played music with his local church. He was mentored by Charles Robinson, who introduced him to local musicians Carvel Austin and Kevin Howard. It was his discovery of drummer Dennis Chambers, however, which impressed him the most.

== Career ==
In 2013, Brown moved to California.

Brown replaced Jon Moss during Culture Club's 2018 Life tour. The band's frontman, Boy George, said in his autobiography: "We hired a new drummer, Garrison Brown, an American who brought such amazing energy to the show. I remember thinking, 'I love American musicians because they love the gig.'"

He has performed live or toured with artists such as Post Malone, Jason Derulo, Snoop Dogg and Morris Day.

In 2020, Brown won a Grammy Award for his work on John Legend's Bigger Love album.

Brown has produced for Terrace Martin on his albums Curly (2023) and Fine Tune (2023), and the EP Her Thoughts (2024).

== Selected discography ==
Brown has appeared on the following selected albums.

- Masterpiece – Deitrick Haddon (2015), drums
- 11:11 Reset – Keyshia Cole (2017), drums
- A Small Death – Samantha Crain (2020), drums
- Bigger Love – John Legend (2020), drums
- Alicia Keys: Rehearsal Room (2024), drums
