= Open Library of Humanities =

Open access academic publisher

- Parent company: Birkbeck, University of London
- Status: Nonprofit
- Founded: 2015
- Founders: Martin Paul Eve, Caroline Edwards
- Country of origin: United Kingdom
- Headquarters location: London, England
- Publication types: Academic journals
- Nonfiction topics: Humanities
- Official website: openlibhums.org

The Open Library of Humanities is a nonprofit, diamond open access publisher in the humanities and social sciences founded by Martin Paul Eve and Caroline Edwards. Founded in 2015, OLH published 27 scholarly journals as of 2022, and as of 2025 lists 33 journals, including a mega journal, also called Open Library of Humanities, which was modeled on PLOS but not affiliated with it.

== History ==
The Open Library of Humanities was officially launched on 28 September 2015. The project was funded by core grants from the Andrew W. Mellon Foundation and uses a library partnership subsidy model to cover costs. It has a number of advisory committees, such as the Academic Steering & Advocacy Committee which includes PLOS co-founder Michael Eisen, Quebec-based academic Jean-Claude Guédon, and the Director of Scholarly Communication of the Modern Language Association, Kathleen Fitzpatrick. An internationalization committee was formed in 2013 to develop an international strategy. A member of this committee, Francisco Osorio, has written that the open access model of the Open Library of Humanities may be beneficial for researchers publishing in languages other than English.

Although originally intended to run on Open Journal Systems, in 2017 OLH started development of a new platform, Janeway. Initially the main press site and the journal Orbit were hosted on the new platform. In of March 2022 the project to migrate the remaining journals was completed. The University of Lincoln, in partnership with the Public Knowledge Project, offered a funded place for an MSc by Research in Computer Science to develop an open-source XML typesetting tool as proposed by the Open Library of Humanities technical roadmap. In November 2013 it was announced that the Public Knowledge Project will be funding the development of the typesetter, known as meTypeset.

The Open Library of Humanities publishing model relies on support from an international group of libraries, which enables the publication of articles without the need for article processing charges. In 2021, OLH became part of Birkbeck, University of London, maintaining its nonprofit status while reducing overhead.

== Journals ==
- Open Library of Humanities
- 19: Interdisciplinary Studies in the Long Nineteenth Century
- ASIANetwork Exchange
- Architectural Histories
- Body, Space & Technology
- C21 Literature: Journal of 21st-Century Writings
- The Comics Grid: Journal of Comics Scholarship
- Digital Medievalist
- Digital Studies / Le champ numérique
- Ethnologia Europaea
- Francosphères
- Free & Equal: A Journal of Ethics and Public Affairs
- Genealogy+Critique
- Glossa: a journal of general linguistics
- International Journal of Welsh Writing in English
- International Labour Review
- Journal of British and Irish Innovative Poetry
- Journal of Embodied Research
- Journal of Portuguese Linguistics
- Laboratory Phonology
- Marvell Studies
- Open Screens
- Orbit: A Journal of American Literature
- Philosophical Logic
- Political Philosophy
- Pynchon Notes
- Quaker Studies
- Studies in the Maternal
- Theoretical Roman Archaeology Journal
- Theory and Social Inquiry (successor journal to Theory and Society)
- Zeitschrift für Fantastikforschung
- The Parish Review: Journal of Flann O'Brien Studies
