= Cultural Trends (journal) =

Peer-reviewed scientific journal

- Discipline: Cultural studies
- Language: English
- Edited by: Eleonora Belfiore, Hye-Kyung Lee

Publication details
- History: 1989-present
- Publisher: Routledge
- Frequency: 5/year
- Open access: Hybrid
- Impact factor: 3.1 (2022)

Standard abbreviations
- ISO 4: Cult. Trends

Indexing
- ISSN: 0954-8963 (print); 1469-3690 (web)
- LCCN: 2017208511
- OCLC no.: 51046212

Links
- Journal homepage

Cultural Trends is a peer-reviewed scientific journal that publishes articles on various aspects of cultural policy and the cultural sector. It is published by Routledge and was established in 1989. The journal publishes articles on topics including creative industries, cultural diplomacy, and cultural work.

== Abstracting and indexing ==
The journal is abstracted and indexed in:

- Arts and Humanities Citation Index
- Current Contents/Arts & Humanities
- Current Contents/Social and Behavioral Sciences
- Social Sciences Citation Index
- Scopus

According to the Journal Citation Reports, the journal has a 2022 impact factor of 3.1.
