= Krishan Kumar (police officer) =

Indian police officer from Rajasthan

IPS Krishan Kumar Bishnoi
- कृष्ण कुमार बिश्नोई
- Born: Dhorimanna, Barmer district, (present day Balotra district Rajasthan, India.
- Education: St. Stephen's College, Delhi; Paris School of International Affairs
- Spouse: Anshika Verma (m. 2026)
- Police career
- Country: Indian Police Service
- Allegiance: India
- Rank: Superintendent of Police
- Batch: 2018
- Cadre: Uttar Pradesh
- Awards: Chief Minister's Excellence Service Police Medal; DGP's Platinum Commendation Disc; DGP's Gold Commendation Disc; DGP's Silver Commendation Disc

Krishan Kumar (KK) Bishnoi is an Indian Police Service (IPS) officer of the 2018 batch, belonging to the Uttar Pradesh cadre. Since January 2026, he has served as the Superintendent of Police (SP) of Sambhal district, Uttar Pradesh.

During his tenure, Bishnoi has been involved in investigations concerning financial fraud and the seizure of illegal property, specifically in the Gorakhpur and Sambhal regions. His decorations include the Chief Minister's Excellence Service Police Medal, the Platinum Commendation Award, and the Director General of Police's (DGP) Silver Medal. He has served as the Superintendent of Police of Sambhal district, Uttar Pradesh.

== Early life and education ==
Bishnoi was born in Dhorimanna, located in the Barmer district of Rajasthan. He completed his undergraduate studies at St. Stephen's College, Delhi. He later pursued a master's degree in International Security at the Paris School of International Affairs in Paris, France.

Prior to joining the civil services, Bishnoi worked with international organizations, including the United Nations International Trade Centre. In 2018, he cleared the Civil Services Examination conducted by the Union Public Service Commission (UPSC), securing an All India Rank of 174, and was allocated to the Indian Police Service.

== Police career ==
After completing his foundational training at the SVP National Police Academy in Hyderabad, Bishnoi was allocated the Uttar Pradesh cadre.

During his tenure as the Superintendent of Police (City) in Gorakhpur, Bishnoi supervised law enforcement operations against financial fraud rings and organized crime networks under the Uttar Pradesh Gangsters and Anti-Social Activities (Prevention) Act.

He was later appointed as the Superintendent of Police of Sambhal district, overseeing district policing, public safety administration, and anti-trafficking initiatives.

=== Awards and decorations ===
- Chief Minister's Excellence Service Police Medal (Uttar Pradesh)
- Director General of Police's (DGP) Platinum Commendation Disc
- Director General of Police's (DGP) Gold Commendation Disc
- Director General of Police's (DGP) Silver Commendation Disc

== Personal life ==
On 29 March 2026, Bishnoi married Anshika Verma, a 2021-batch IPS officer of the Uttar Pradesh cadre, in Jodhpur, Rajasthan.

== See also ==
- Law enforcement in India
- Uttar Pradesh Police
