= Monica Prasad =

American sociologist

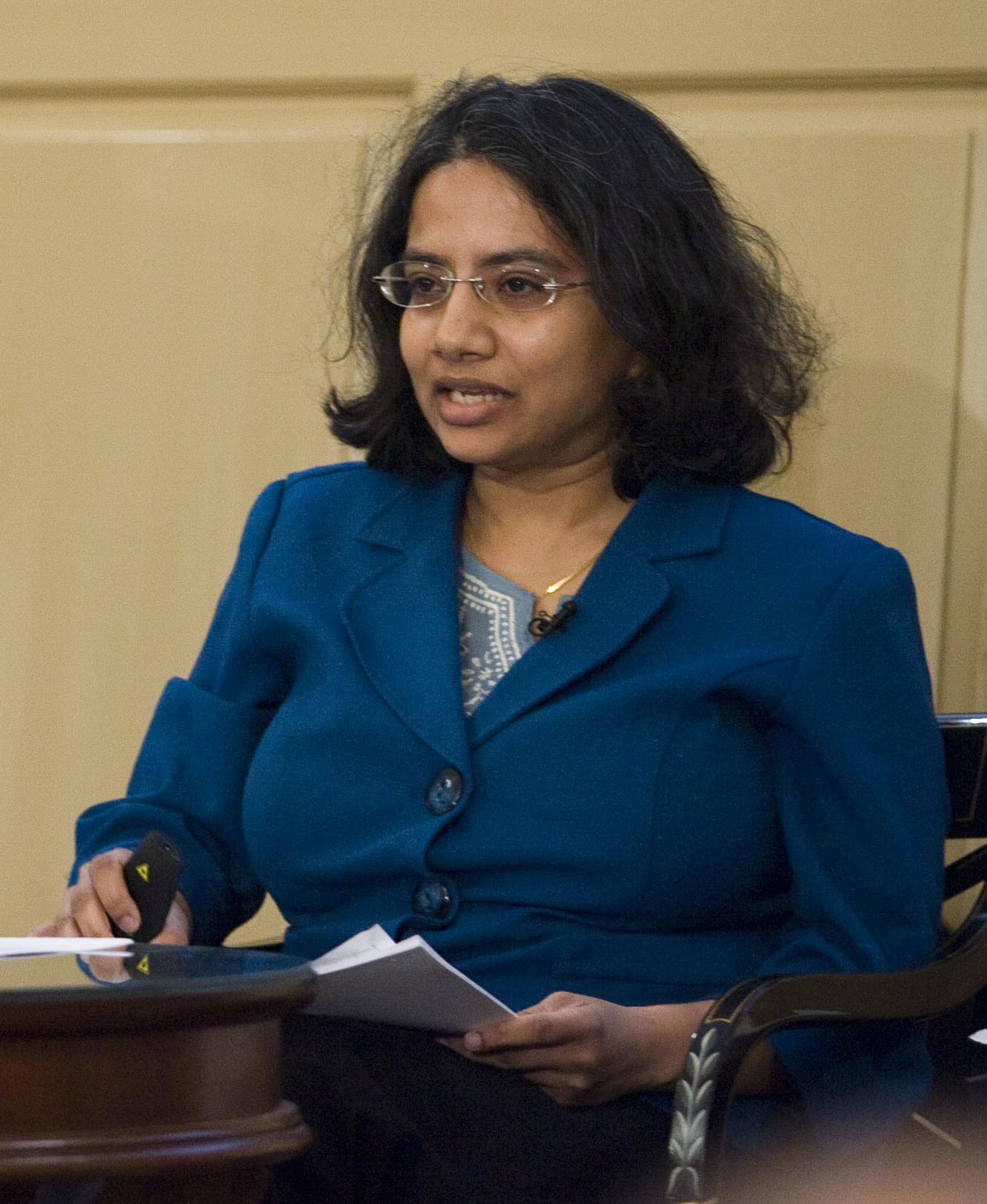
- Prasad in 2011
- Occupation: Professor of Sociology

Academic background
- Education: University of Chicago
- Thesis: The Politics of Free Markets: The Rise of Neoliberal Economic Policy in Britain, France, and the United States (2000)
- Doctoral advisor: William Parish; George Steinmetz

Academic work
- Discipline: Sociologist
- Sub-discipline: Political sociology, economic sociology, comparative sociology
- Institutions: Northwestern University, Johns Hopkins University

Monica Prasad (born 1971) is an American sociologist who has won several awards for her books on economic and political sociology.

Prasad is a Bloomberg Distinguished Professor of Economic and Political Sociology at Johns Hopkins University. She was previously a Professor of Sociology at Northwestern University and a 2015 Guggenheim fellow. Her research interests are in the areas of economic sociology, political sociology and comparative historical sociology. As of 2022, her research investigated market-oriented welfare policies in Europe and their economic consequences.

== Education ==
Prasad completed her PhD in sociology at the University of Chicago under the guidance of William Parish and George Steinmetz in 2000.

Prasad was awarded a National Science Foundation Early Career Development Grant and, in 2011, received a Fulbright grant to study at Sciences Po in Paris.

== Career ==
In 2010, Prasad was a committee member for the Theory Prize, awarded by the Theory Section of the American Sociological Association for outstanding books and papers in the work of theory.

In 2015, Prasad was selected as one of 173 Guggenheim fellows, a John Simon Guggenheim Memorial Foundation-sponsored scholarship.

Prior to joining the faculty at Johns Hopkins University in 2023, Prasad was a Professor of Sociology at Northwestern University.

Prasad is the author of several academic works. In her 2006 book The Politics of Free Markets: The Rise of Neoliberal Economic Policies in Britain, France, Germany, and the United States, she argues that countries' different political climates and policy regimes resulted in divergent types of neoliberalism. Her 2013 book The Land of Too Much: American Abundance and the Paradox of Poverty examines why the United States has significantly higher levels of poverty and inequality than other rich countries and the impact of government intervention on undermining the welfare state. In 2018, Prasad's Starving the Beast: Ronald Reagan and the Tax Cut Revolution was published.

Prasad is a senior fellow at the Niskanen Center.

== Awards ==
Prasad has twice won the Barrington Moore Book Award from the Comparative and Historical Sociology section of the American Sociological Association, first in 2007 for her book The Politics of Free Markets, and again in 2013 for The Land of Too Much, as a co-winner with Michael Mann. In 2014, she was awarded the American Sociological Association Distinguished Scholarly Book Award for The Land of Too Much. This award celebrates the best book published by an ASA member in the preceding two years.
