= Krishan Kumar Singh =

Indian politician

Krishna Kumar Singh
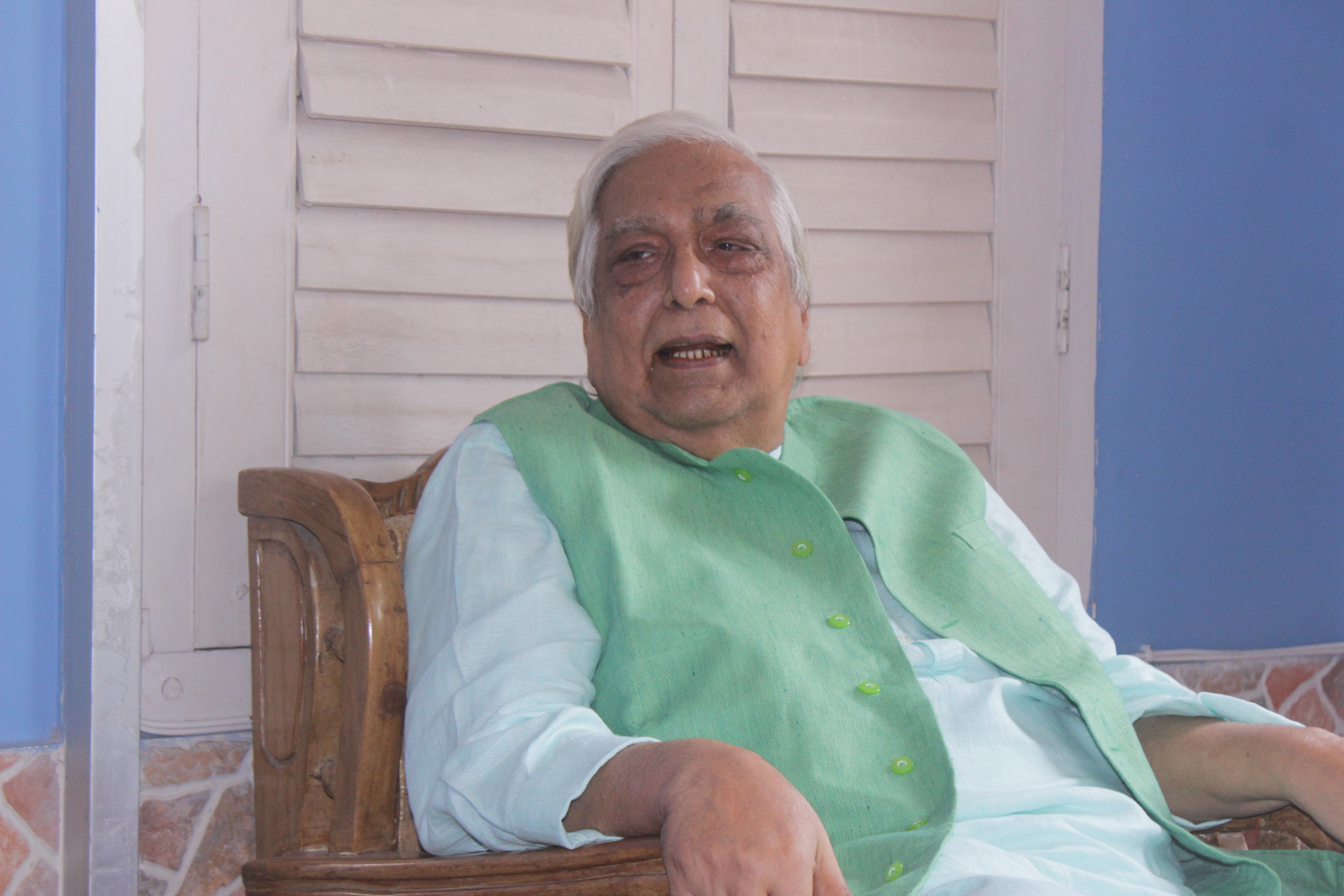

Member of Bihar Legislative Council
- In office 7 May 2014 – 6 May 2020
- Constituency: elected by the members of Legislative Assembly

Personal details
- Born: 23 September 1946 (age 80) Gaya, Bihar
- Party: Bharatiya Janata Party
- Spouse: Usha Singh
- Children: 2 sons
- Parent: Surya Deep Narayan Singh
- Education: Magadh University (M.Sc)
- Profession: Businessman, Politician

Krishna Kumar Singh was an Indian politician. He was a member of the Bharatiya Janata Party (BJP) and of the BJP State Executive. He was a member of the Bihar Legislative Council from 2014–2020.

== Early life ==
Krishna Kumar Singh was born on 23 September 1946 in Gaya, Bihar. His father was Surya Deep Narayan Singh. His early education took place at Rajendra Vidyalaya. He obtained his ISC and BSc from Gaya College. He obtained his MSc degree from Gaya College (Magadha University).

== Career ==
He started a business marketing pumping sets and electrical goods in Gaya in 1967.

=== Politics ===
In 1980, he entered active politics and contested the assembly elections from Belaganj Vidhan Sabha of Gaya district. He was the BJP district president of Gaya district for three terms. In 1992, he served as President of the State Executive of BJP Bihar. He became president of the Udyog Manch of Bihar state. He served as a member of National Working Committee of National Kisan Morcha BJP. He was the national secretary of non-conventional energy. He was elected member of Bihar Legislative Council in 2014.

In 2000, he established Kumar Organic Products Ltd, in Karnataka.

== Recognition ==
- 1987 National Award for Small Industries.

== Personal life ==
Krishna Kumar Singh married Usha Singh from Ahiyapur Unch Village in 1964. The couple has two sons. He has three grandsons and one granddaughter.
