= Jose Itzigsohn =

American sociologist

José Itzigsohn (born August 23, 1960) is a professor of sociology at Brown University. He is the author of two books and has written numerous journal articles.

== Background ==
Itzigsohn graduated from The Hebrew University of Jerusalem in 1989 with a bachelor's of arts degree cum laude in sociology. He received his PhD in Sociology from The Johns Hopkins University in 1995.

== Research ==
Itzigsohn's research has two main areas of focus. The first is the political economy of development. His first book, Developing Poverty, focuses on the informal economy in Costa Rica and the Dominican Republic as well as how the state impacts these structures.

His second main area of research has to do with race and ethnicity in the United States, and particularly, immigrant incorporation. His second book, "Encountering American Faultlines," details the experience of Dominicans in Providence, and particularly focuses on their racial and ethnic identity formation. Through this case study, Itzigsohn looks at both first and second-generation Dominicans and what their position is within the socioeconomic structure. He finds that second-generation immigrants fare slightly better than their parents but mostly remain in service-based working class occupations. In addition, Itzigsohn finds that while first-generation Dominicans embrace transnational identities, second-generation Dominicans gear more towards a panethnic identity as Latinos.

Itzigsohn's most recent publication with Marcelo Bohrt analyzes the incorporation of Latino immigrants and tests the stratified ethnoracial incorporation approach, which analyzes the influence of both race and class. He is currently researching the practices and organizational structure of factories in Argentina that were taken over by workers and are currently run by these workers.

== Awards ==
Itzigsohn received the Distinguished Contribution to Scholarship Book Award in 2009 for his book "Encountering American Faultlines" from the American Sociological Association's Section on Latino/a Sociology.
