= University of Westminster Press =

Open access academic press

- Parent company: University of Westminster
- Founded: 2015; 10 years ago
- Country of origin: United Kingdom
- Headquarters location: London
- Publication types: books, academic journals
- Official website: uwestminsterpress.co.uk

University of Westminster Press is the open access academic press of the University of Westminster, England. It publishes academic books and peer-reviewed journals and runs on the Ubiquity Press platform.
