= The Colonial Origins of Modern Social Thought =

2023 book by George Steinmetz

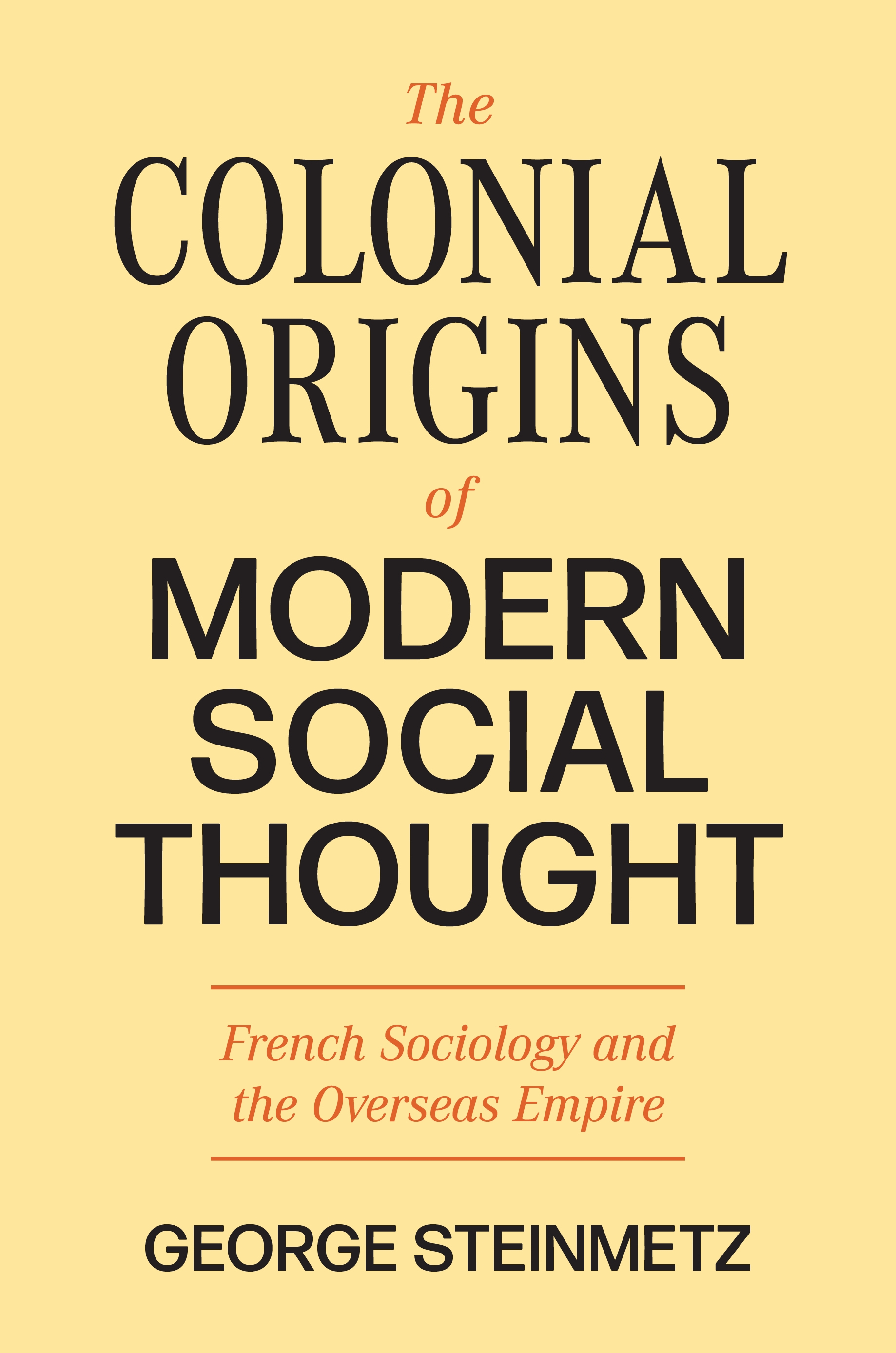
- Cover
- Author: George Steinmetz
- Original title: The Colonial Origins of Modern Social Thought: French Sociology and the Overseas Empire
- Language: English
- Series: Princeton Modern Knowledge
- Subject: Colonialism and post-colonialism, sociology, French colonial history
- Genre: Non-fiction
- Publisher: Princeton University Press
- Publication date: 2023
- Publication place: United States
- Pages: 576
- ISBN: 9780691237428

The Colonial Origins of Modern Social Thought: French Sociology and the Overseas Empire is a book by American sociologist, author and academic George Steinmetz. It was published by Princeton University Press in 2023 and is part of its Princeton Modern Knowledge series. The book is a historical exploration of the development of modern French sociology within the context of the French empire post-World War II. Steinmetz argues, based on a prosopgraphic reconstruction of the postwar French sociology field, that around half of the rise of social sciences was intertwined with imperial efforts to control colonies, particularly between the late 1930s and the 1960s. Steinmetz goes beyond the "decolonial" discourse, aiming to uncover the feedback effects of colonial knowledge on sociology's ordinary production. The book employs a new methodological approach, blending contextual factors, intellectual dynamics within the social sciences, and close readings of sociological texts, to examine the colonial engagement of prominent sociologists like Raymond Aron, Jacques Berque, Georges Balandier, and Pierre Bourdieu.

== Summary ==
The book provides a comprehensive analysis of the colonial roots of French sociology in the mid-twentieth century. The book expands the scope of French sociology beyond methodological nationalism, encompassing the geographic expanse of 'Greater France.' Steinmetz defines 'colonial sociology' as all forms of sociological writing focused on overseas colonies and imperial phenomena. The book, influenced by a 'neo-Bourdieusian' approach, explores the transnational nature of French sociology within the French empire.

Steinmetz argues that around half of the discipline in the period from 1944 to 1965 consisted of colonial specialists. The historical analysis framework allows deeper insights than existing literature on decolonizing sociology. The book challenges conventional historiographies, emphasizing the importance of shifting focus from the metropole to the empire. It divides into five parts, exploring the sociology of colonies, political and intellectual contexts, French colonial sociology from 1918 to the 1960s, and in-depth profiles of four sociologists. Steinmetz highlights how sociology served the French empire post-World War II, particularly in developmentalist initiatives, and emphasizes interdisciplinary connections with other colonial social sciences. He asserts that French colonial sociology made lasting methodological and conceptual contributions, influencing the discipline's trajectory. The book concludes with reflections on the challenges of analyzing the external relationships of a field and the ethical considerations of incorporating colonial sociological works into contemporary curricula. The book's Bourdieusian approach connects colonial situations to the shaping of sociological knowledge, challenging prevailing perspectives on the history of sociology.

== Reviews ==
Christian Dayé (Note: From Graz University of Technology) praised the book for its detailed depiction of the intertwining of French sociology with colonialism in Africa. Dayé highlighted the author's specific methodological approach, termed "neo-Bourdieuian historical sociology of science," rooted in Bourdieu's understanding of social practice. The review acknowledged Steinmetz's challenge in addressing the history of French colonial sociology, particularly the veil of silence and forgetfulness surrounding these matters. Dayé emphasized the work's readability, detailed exploration of complex connections, and linguistic competence. While suggesting minor improvements, such as a more developed field-theoretical approach and graphical representations, Dayé concluded that these were minor points compared to the overall achievement of the book.

Ali Meghji (Note: From the University of Cambridge) praised the book considering it a tour de force in the historical sociology of sociology. Meghji highlighted Steinmetz's thorough analysis of the colonial origins of French sociology, emphasizing its transnational nature across the French empire. He commended Steinmetz's neo-Bourdieusian approach, which goes beyond the use of analytical concepts, allowing for a deeper understanding of mid-twentieth-century French sociology.

Nicholas Hoover Wilson, sociologist and academic at Stony Brook University, commended the book for its thorough relational approach, challenging conventional categories and emphasizing ongoing classification struggles. Wilson lauded the substance of the book, describing it as a revelatory combination of three traditions, including historical sociology of knowledge and detailed studies of anthropologists and sociologists. He acknowledged the book's refusal of a simplistic "colonizing/colonized" dichotomy, appreciating its nuanced exploration of postwar French sociology's grappling with colonialism. While offering substantial praise, Wilson also posed methodological and analytical questions, such as the practicality of a comprehensive reading of all scholars entangled by colonialism and the potential challenges arising from ontological commitments. He questioned the book's focus on "greater France" despite its singular title, and noted its subtle advocacy for the utility of psychoanalysis in the sociology of culture. Wilson highlighted the book's explicit departure from certain efforts to "decolonize" sociology, raising concerns about maintaining the discipline's autonomy.

Austin H. Vo praised the book as a compelling and timely intervention. Vo commended Steinmetz for his meticulous analysis of colonial sociological research, emphasizing the historical and critical emergence of French sociology against the backdrop of colonial conquest, subjugation, and racism. The reviewer highlighted Steinmetz's neo-Bourdieusian perspective and the multiplex analytic strategy employed, shedding light on the often-repressed colonial origins of French sociology. Vo found the analysis of key actors, institutions, and the vibrant colonial sociology during that era to be particularly insightful. Vo saw Steinmetz's work as a generative and vigilant revision of French intellectual history, urging readers to recognize the colonial entanglements that shaped modern frameworks.

Zeke Baker (Note: Environmental sociologist from Sonoma State University) appreciated the book's use of original archival sources and interviews to explain the relationship between French sociology and colonialism from the 1930s to 60s. Baker acknowledged the theoretical approach rooted in Bourdieu's field theory and praised the book for opening up possibilities for comparative analysis of colonial situations and corresponding knowledge.

Anne Kwaschik (Note: From the University of Konstanz) reviewed the book and underscored its significance, praising its comprehensive exploration of sociology's historical ties to colonialism and its impact on academic development. She commended Steinmetz's delving into personal and institutional archives, highlighting its rich source material. Kwaschik observed that the book unveils the evolving landscape of colonial sociology, emphasizing its interdisciplinary and context-sensitive nature.

In his review (Note: In French) published by la vie des idées,Jean-Louis Fabiani valued Steinmetz's ambitious exploration of the "colonial matrix"'s significance in shaping modern world social sciences. The reviewer commended Steinmetz for his historical perspective, emphasizing the importance of anamnesis to bring back cognitive patterns from the colonial period and highlighting the author's meticulous analysis of the gradual autonomy of colonial knowledge institutions. Fabiani acknowledged Steinmetz's merit in shedding light on the intricate connections between colonial sociology and the development of the social sciences in post-war France.
