= Karida Brown =

American academic

Academic background
- Education: Brown University
- Thesis: Before they were Diamonds: The Intergenerational Migration of Kentucky's Coal Camp Blacks (2017)

Karida L. Brown is an American sociologist, author, professor, and public intellectual who serves as Professor of Sociology at Emory University. She served as the inaugural Director of Racial Equity & Action at the Los Angeles Lakers from 2020 to 2022. She is recognized for her scholarship on Black history and culture. Her research also examines the history and function of racial colonial capitalism. She has published widely on a broad array of topics, migration, education, collective memory, and social theory.

== Early life and education ==
Brown was born and raised in Uniondale, New York, to Richard Brown and Arnita Davis-Brown. Her father worked as a sanitation worker for the Town of Hempstead, while her mother labored as a physical therapist at Hempstead General hospital. Her parents migrated to Long Island, New York in the 1960s from Lynch, Kentucky, a company-owned coal mining town in Appalachia. She has one sibling, Richard Charu Brown, Jr.

Brown graduated from Uniondale High School in 2000 and attended Temple University, from which she graduated in 2004 with a Bachelor of Business Administration in Risk Management and Insurance. After a six-year stint in the private sector, Brown returned to school, subsequently earning a Master Public Administration from the University of Pennsylvania in 2011 and a Ph.D. in Sociology from Brown University in 2016. Her dissertation, The Ties that Bind: the Intergenerational Migration of Kentucky’s Coal Camp Blacks, won the 2017 Best Dissertation Award from the American Sociological Association.

== Career ==
Brown's first job after college was as an underwriter at American International Group and then she went on to work at Zurich North America. After earning her Ph.D., Brown joined the faculty at the University of California, Los Angeles as an assistant professor. She was promoted to full professor and received tenure in 2021. In 2022 she moved to Emory University where she is a professor of sociology.

In 2020 Brown was named the director of racial equity and action for the Los Angeles Lakers. She held the position until the beginning of 2023.

Brown is the author of six books, Gone Home: Race and Roots through Appalachia, The Sociology of W.E.B. Du Bois: Racialize Modernity and the Global Color Line, The Oxford Handbook of W. E. B. Du Bois, The New Brownies' Book: A Love Letter to Black Families, which won the 2024 NAACP Image award for Outstanding Literary Work – Non-Fiction, Race in America 3rd edition, and The Battle for the Black Mind.

Brown served on the board of The Obama Presidency Oral History Project.

== Personal life ==
Brown lives in Atlanta, GA with her husband, fine artist and illustrator, Charly Palmer and their two pugs.

== Awards and honors ==
- 2024 NAACP Image Award—Outstanding Non Fiction
- 2024 Boston Globe Horn Book Special Citation Recipient
- 2023 Temple University, RMI Fox School of Business Distinguished Alumni Award
- 2021 Uniondale High School Hall of Fame inductee
- Runner Up, 2019 Weatherford Award for best book of Non-Fiction, sponsored by the Appalachian Studies Association
- Co-Winner, 2019 Oliver Cromwell Cox Book Award from the American Sociological Association’s Section on Racial and Ethnic Minorities
- Winner, 2019 Mary Douglas Prize for Best Book from the American Sociological Association’s Sociology of Culture Section
- Winner, 2019 Distinguished Contribution to Scholarship Book Award from the American Sociological Association’s Section on Race, Gender, and Class
- Honorable Mention, 2019 Otis Dudley Duncan Book Award from the American Sociological Association’s Sociology of Population Section
- Finalist, 2018 Prose Award, sponsored by the Professional and Scholarly Publishing Division, Association of American Publishers. Prose Award for Excellence in Social Sciences
- American Sociological Association 2017 Best Dissertation Award

== Selected publications ==
- Brown, Karida L. (2025) The Battle for the Black Mind. Legacy Lit Books
- Brown, Karida L. and Charly Palmer. (2023) The New Brownies Book: A Love Letter to Black Families. Chronicle Books
- Brown, Karida L (2016). "The 'hidden injuries' of school desegregation: Cultural trauma and transforming African American identities". American Journal of Cultural Sociology. 4 (2): 196–220. doi:10.1057/ajcs.2016.4. ISSN 2049-7113.
- Brown, Karida L. (2018) Gone Home: Race and Roots through Appalachia. University of North Carolina Press
- Itzigsohn, José and Karida L. Brown. (2020) The Sociology of W.E.B. Du Bois: Racialized Modernity and the Global Color Line. NYU Press.
- Brown, Karida L. and Luna Vincent, (2022) “American Pragmatism and the Dilemma of the Negro”, in Isaac Reed, Neil Gross, and Christopher Winship eds. Agency, Inquiry, and Democracy: The New Pragmatist Social Science. Columbia University Press
