= Ubiquity Press =

Publishing house in London, United Kingdom

- Parent company: De Gruyter
- Status: Active
- Country of origin: United Kingdom
- Headquarters location: London, E1
- Distribution: Open access
- Publication types: journals, books
- Official website: ubiquity.pub

Ubiquity Press is an academic publisher focusing on open access, peer-reviewed scholarship. Founded in 2008 by Brian Hole, Ubiquity Press is a part of Ubiquity, which also provides full publishing infrastructure and services to university presses, and repositories for institutions.

Ubiquity operates as a for-profit entity, but involves stakeholders in business planning through a variety of advisory structures, including a Ubiquity Partner Advisory Board and a North American Library Advisory Board.

In 2018, the shareholders of Ubiquity adopted a charter to formally govern the company's business practices and to ensure that in the event of a change of control, it would adhere to the following three central tenets: 1) that all Ubiquity-published articles and books will be open access, "universally and freely accessible vie the Internet, in an easily readable format, with a Creative Commons Attribution license," 2) that all code licensed as part of the Partner Press Platform will be open source and free for reuse, and 3) that all products of Ubiquity will be unbundled, "available for sale individually…not…made exclusively available as part of larger product bundles."

Ubiquity Press is also a member of the Committee on Publication Ethics, the Association of Learned and Professional Society Publishers, and the Open Access Scholarly Publishers Association.

De Gruyter acquired Ubiquity Press in October 2022.

== See also ==
- Journals published by Ubiquity Press
- Open Library of Humanities
- University of Westminster Press
