= List of American University people =

This is a sorted list of notable persons who have had ties to the American University in Washington, D.C.

== Notable alumni ==
This is a list of notable alumni of AU. Some particularly notable individuals are also listed in the main University article. Individuals are sorted by category and alphabetized within each category. The degree, school and year of graduation is noted when available.

=== Government, politics, society, and royalty ===
- Atiaf Alwazir – Lebanese human rights activist
- Erik Altieri – executive director of the National Organization for the Reform of Marijuana Laws (NORML), CAS
- Charles R. Black, Jr. – chief campaign adviser for Senator John McCain in the 2008 US presidential election; lobbyist for BKSH & Associates
- Juan Mari Brás – Puerto Rican independence advocate, founder of the Puerto Rican Socialist Party, WCL
- Julie E. Cram – lobbyist and Republican operative
- Quentin Fulks – campaign manager, SPA/MA '15
- Patricia Harrison – co-chair of the Republican National Committee, SIS
- Hubert Horatio "Skip" Humphrey III – politician, son of Vice President Hubert Humphrey
- Princess Iman – daughter of King Hussein bin Talal and Queen Noor of Jordan, half-sister to King Abdullah II of Jordan
- Julia Imene-Chanduru – diplomat, has served as deputy permanent representative of Namibia to the United Nations in New York and permanent representative of Namibia to the United Nations Office in Geneva
- Paul D. Irving – sergeant-at-arms of the United States House of Representatives
- Sara Dunlap Jackson – National Archives and Records Administration archivist, Military Archives Division
- Nancy Jacobson – Democratic Party fundraiser, SPA/MA
- Rosalie Gardiner Jones – suffragette, DCL '22
- Prince Sheikh Isa bin Salman Al Khalifa of Bahrain – son of Prince Salman bin Hamad bin Isa Al Khalifa, crown prince and prime minister of Bahrain
- Victor Kamber – labor union activist and political consultant WCL/JD
- Petra Kelly – founder of Germany's Green Party, SIS/BA '70
- Pan Suk Kim – South Korean professor of public administration, researcher, scholar
- Koko Kondo, born Koko Tanimoto – prominent atomic bomb survivor (Hiroshima) and international peace activist, '69
- Corey Lewandowski – campaign manager for Senator Bob Smith and Donald Trump
- Prince Joel Dawit Makonnen – lawyer, member of the Ethiopian imperial family
- Mindy Myers – Democratic political strategist and campaign executive, SPA/BA '98
- Bob Odell – former member of the New Hampshire Senate.
- Alice Paul – feminist, author of the Equal Rights Amendment, WCL/LLM '27 PhD '28
- Yabshi Pan Rinzinwangmo – daughter of Choekyi Gyaltsen, the 10th Panchen Lama of Tibet
- Nicholas Sarwark – chairman of the U.S. Libertarian Party (2014–present)
- V. Lance Tarrance, Jr. – leading Republican Party pollster and political strategist, SPA/MA
- Edmundo González Urrutia – diplomat and president-elect of Venezuela
- Edward von Kloberg III – lobbyist, CAS

==== Foreign heads of state, deputy heads of state, and ministers ====
- Pongpol Adireksarn – deputy prime minister of the Kingdom of Thailand
- Lisiate ‘Akolo – member of the Legislative Assembly of Tonga and Cabinet of Tonga minister for Labour, Commerce and Industries
- Julius Maada Bio – current president and former military head of state of Sierra Leone under the National Provisional Ruling Council junta government of 1996, SIS/MA
- Allen Chastanet – former prime minister of Saint Lucia
- Sheikh Salman bin Hamad bin Isa Al Khalifa – crown prince and prime minister of Bahrain; Commander-In-Chief of the Bahrain Defense Force, SPA '92
- Ousmane Issoufi Maïga – prime minister of the Republic of Mali
- Keith Mitchell – prime minister of Grenada, CAS/PhD '79
- Samuel Lewis Navarro – first vice president and foreign minister of Panama, KSB/MBA '81
- Longin Pastusiak – marshal of the Senate of the Republic of Poland, '62
- Mauricio Pimiento – senator of Colombia; governor of the Cesar Department of Colombia, WCL
- Ghazi Mashal Ajil al-Yawer – president of Iraq under the Iraqi Interim Government of 2004–2005, vice president of Iraq under the Iraqi Transitional Government of 2005

==== Ambassadors, diplomats, and foreign ministers ====
- Morton I. Abramowitz – United States ambassador to Turkey and Thailand; director of the Bureau of Intelligence and Research
- Liliana Ayalde – United States ambassador to Brazil
- Doreen Bogdan-Martin – director of the Telecommunication Development Bureau of the International Telecommunication Union; candidate for secretary general of the International Telecommunication Union, SIS/MA
- Herman Jay Cohen – United States ambassador to Gambia and Senegal, Assistant Secretary of State for African Affairs, SIS/MA '62
- John B. Craig – United States ambassador to Oman; director of Arabian Peninsula Affairs, Bureau of Near Eastern Affairs in the United States Department of State, SIS/BA
- Arturo Cruz, Jr. – ambassador of Nicaragua to the United States
- David B. Dunn – United States ambassador to Togo and Zambia, MA
- Murat Salim Esenli – ambassador of Turkey to China, SPA/BA '84
- Marc Ginsberg – United States ambassador to Morocco, BA
- Reno L. Harnish – United States ambassador to Azerbaijan, SIS/MA
- Cam Henderson – former chief of Protocol of the United States
- Cameron R. Hume – United States ambassador to Indonesia
- Abdul Ilah Khatib – Minister of Foreign Affairs of Jordan; United Nations special envoy to Libya during the 2011 Libyan civil war, SIS/MA
- Carol Laise – United States ambassador to Nepal, director general of the United States Foreign Service and Assistant Secretary of State for Public Affairs, SPA/BA '38
- Nizar Bin Obaid Madani – deputy foreign minister of the Kingdom of Saudi Arabia, SIS/MA '71, SIS/PhD '77
- Jean Elizabeth Manes – current civilian deputy and foreign policy advisor to General Laura J. Richardson, former United States ambassador to El Salvador, SPA/MPA '96
- Francis E. Meloy, Jr. – United States ambassador to the Dominican Republic, Guatemala and Lebanon; assassinated in Beirut in 1976
- Connie Morella – United States ambassador to the OECD, former US representative, professor at Hamline University
- Vincent Obsitnik – United States ambassador to Slovakia; business executive at IBM, Unisys and Litton, KSB/MBA
- Charles Pergler – ambassador of Czechoslovakia to the United States and Japan, WCL/LLM
- John Peurifoy – United States ambassador to Greece, Thailand and Guatemala
- Khadija al-Salami – press and cultural attaché and director of the Yemeni Information Centre at the Embassy of Yemen in Paris; first female Yemeni film producer, SOC '90
- Omar Samad – ambassador of Afghanistan to Canada, former CNN analyst
- Kantathi Suphamongkhon – foreign minister of the Kingdom of Thailand, former Thai member of Parliament, SIS/MA
- Lawrence Palmer Taylor – United States ambassador to Estonia, MA
- Meshal bin Hamad Al Thani – State of Qatar ambassador to the United States of America
- Esteban Edward Torres – ambassador to UNESCO; United States representative from California, '66
- Richard Verma – United States ambassador to India
- Richard Noyes Viets – United States ambassador to Tanzania and Jordan
- Marilyn Ware – United States ambassador to Finland
- Dessima Williams – ambassador of Grenada to the United Nations, PhD
- Curtin Winsor, Jr. – United States ambassador to Costa Rica, SIS/MA '64, SIS/PhD'71

==== United States senators and representatives ====
- Ken Bentsen, Jr. – United States representative from Texas, SPA/MPA '85
- James Bilbray – United States representative from Nevada; Nevada state senator, CAS/BA '62, WCL/JD '65
- Don Bonker – United States representative from Washington, MA
- Dave Brat – United States representative from Virginia, chair of the Economics Department of Randolph–Macon College, CAS/PhD '95
- Julia Brownley – United States representative from California, MBA '79
- Robert Byrd – United States senator from West Virginia, WCL '63
- Carroll A. Campbell, Jr. – United States representative from South Carolina, governor of South Carolina, SPA/MA '85
- Thomas Downey – United States representative from New York, WCL/JD '80
- Gwen Graham – United States representative from Florida, WCL/JD '88
- Lawrence Joseph Hogan – United States representative from Maryland, county executive of Prince George's County, Maryland, '65
- Tim Huelskamp – United States representative from Kansas; Kansas state senator, SPA/PhD '95
- Chris Jacobs – United States representative from New York, MA
- Michael J. Kopetski – United States representative from Oregon, BA '71
- Rick Lazio – United States representative from New York, WCL
- Donald Manzullo – United States representative from Illinois, SPA '67
- Betsy Markey – United States representative from Colorado, MPA '83
- Sarah McBride – United States representative from Delaware's at-large congressional district BA ‘13
- Donald McEachin– United States representative from Virginia, BS '82
- Jim McGovern – United States representative from Massachusetts, CAS/BA '81, SPA/MA '84
- Connie Morella – United States representative from Maryland, United States ambassador to the OECD, MA '67
- Mike Panetta – United States shadow representative from the District of Columbia, SPA '93, '94
- Loretta Sanchez – United States representative from California, KSB '84
- Edward Schrock – United States representative from Virginia MA ‘75
- Bill Shuster – United States representative from Pennsylvania, KSB/MBA
- Bud Shuster – United States representative from Pennsylvania, PhD '67
- Haley Stevens – United States representative from Michigan
- Paul Strauss – United States shadow senator from the District of Columbia, SPA '86, WCL '93
- Robin Tallon – United States representative from South Carolina, BA '94
- Esteban Edward Torres – United States representative from California; ambassador to UNESCO, '66
- Susan Wild – United States representative from Pennsylvania BA ‘78

==== United States government and military ====
- William J. Boarman – Public Printer of the United States under President Barack Obama
- Walter E. Boomer – Marine Corps general and commanding officer of all Marines in the Gulf War
- Gary Cohn – director of the National Economic Council
- Julia Curlee – CIA officer and a director at the United States National Security Council
- Cari M. Dominguez – 12th chair of the United States' Equal Employment Opportunity Commission, SIS/BA, SIS/MA
- Kenneth Duberstein – White House Chief of Staff under President Ronald Reagan SPA/MA '66
- Marguerite M. Engler – acting scientific director of the National Institute of Nursing Research's division of intramural research BS '78, MS '81
- Arthur S. Flemming – United States Secretary of Health, Education, and Welfare, SPA/MA '28
- Anne N. Foreman – former general counsel of the Air Force and United States Under Secretary of the Air Force, WCL
- Jacques Gansler – former Under Secretary of Defense for Acquisition, Technology and Logistics, CAS/PhD
- Faisal Gill – Department of Homeland Security senior policy adviser; Republican Virginia House of Delegates candidate, BA, WCL/JD
- Shuwanza Goff – political advisor, served as the director of the White House Office of Legislative Affairs under Joe Biden, MA '08
- Bo Gritz – United States Army Special Forces officer during the Vietnam War; radio host
- Paul Hackett – Iraq War veteran, 2006 United States Senate candidate from Ohio, and trial lawyer, Washington Semester
- Virginia Hall – spy during World War II; only civilian woman to receive the Distinguished Service Cross award during World War II
- Edward Lee Howard – CIA agent who defected to the Soviet Union in 1985
- John Albert Knebel – United States Secretary of Agriculture under President Gerald Ford, WCL/JD '65
- John Macy – director of the United States Federal Emergency Management Agency; United States Government administrator and civil servant
- Gordon H. Mansfield – United States Deputy Secretary of Veterans Affairs, WCL
- Barry McCaffrey – White House drug czar under President Bill Clinton, retired United States Army general, NBC News and MSNBC military analyst
- M. Peter McPherson – director of the USAID Program under President Ronald Reagan, president of Michigan State University, director of Dow Jones, WCL/JD '69
- Warren L. Miller – director of the U.S. Commission for the Preservation of America's Heritage Abroad, BA
- David Nason – assistant secretary for Financial Institutions under Treasury Secretary Henry M. Paulson; key architect of the federal response to the 2008 financial crisis, KSB/BSBA '92, WCL/JD '95
- Nicole Nason – administrator of the Federal Highway Administration; administrator of the National Highway Traffic Safety Administration, BA
- Diana Villiers Negroponte – US trade lawyer, wife of United States Deputy Secretary of State John Negroponte, WCL/JD
- Ron Nessen – White House press secretary under President Gerald Ford
- William Pickle – 37th United States Senate sergeant at arms; highly decorated Vietnam War veteran
- Nitin Pradhan – US Department of Transportation chief information officer
- Edward Rowny - Ambassador as the President's chief negotiator on Strategic Nuclear Arms and Lt. General, SIS/PhD
- Donna Shalala – United States Secretary of Health and Human Services, current president of the University of Miami, Washington Semester
- William C. Sullivan – head of the Federal Bureau of Investigation intelligence operations, MA
- Vanessa Allen Sutherland – former chairperson of the U.S. Chemical Safety and Hazard Investigation Board, KSB/MBA'97 and WCL/JD '96
- Paul Teller – executive director of the United States House of Representatives Republican Study Committee
- Hugo Teufel III – Department of Homeland Security chief privacy officer, WCL/JD '90
- Desson Thomson – White House speechwriter for President Barack Obama; The Washington Post film critic, SOC/BA ’80
- Frances Townsend – United States Department of Homeland Security advisor to President George W. Bush, SPA/BA, CAS/BS '82
- Nury Turkel – lawyer and former chair and commissioner of the United States Commission on International Religious Freedom appointed by Nancy Pelosi, JD '04 MA '05
- William J. Walker – United States Army major general, commanding general, District of Columbia National Guard, former director, Office of Diversion and Chemical Control, Drug Enforcement Administration, M.A. '06
- Rosa Whitaker – assistant United States Trade Representative, Office of African Affairs, BA, MA
- Brian Willson – United States Air Force veteran, lawyer, prominent anti-war activist, WCL

==== US state and local governments ====
- Kristen J. Amundson – Virginia House delegate, MA '78
- Toney Anaya – governor of New Mexico, WCL '67
- Stephen Archambault – member of the Rhode Island Senate, SPA/BA
- Owen Aspinall – governor of American Samoa, BA '55
- Elizabeth Berry – member of the Washington House of Representatives, SPA/BA
- Justin Bibb – mayor of Cleveland, Ohio, BA '09
- James Bilbray – Nevada state senator; United States representative from Nevada, CAS/BA '62, WCL/JD '65
- Muriel Bowser – mayor of Washington, D.C., former member of the Council of the District of Columbia, representing Ward 4, SPA/MPP '00
- James T. Brett – Massachusetts House representative, BA
- Wallis Brooks – Pennsylvania House representative, CAS/BA '69
- Julia Brownley – California State Assemblywoman, KSB/MBA '79
- Carroll A. Campbell, Jr. – governor of South Carolina, South Carolina State Representative and United States representative, MA
- Robert A. Cerasoli – Massachusetts House of Representatives, inspector general of Commonwealth of Massachusetts, inspector general of City of New Orleans
- Sam Cho – commissioner of the Port of Seattle SIS/BA '13
- Ulysses Currie – Maryland state senator
- Chris Danou – Wisconsin State Assemblyman, SIS/MA '91
- Jim Dillard – Virginia House delegate, SPA/MA
- John DiSanto – member of the Pennsylvania State Senate, KSB/BBA
- Adam Ebbin – Virginia state senator; former Virginia House delegate, '85
- Bill Emmerson – California state senator, former California State Assemblyman, SPA
- Hugh Farley – New York state senator, WCL/JD
- Eileen Filler-Corn – speaker of the Virginia House of Delegates, WCL, JD '93
- Richard A. Flintrop – Wisconsin state assemblyman
- Robert L. Floyd – mayor of Miami, WCL/JD '41
- Rick Gray – mayor of Lancaster, Pennsylvania
- Michael Grieco – member of the Florida House of Representatives, '97
- Kim Guadagno – former lieutenant governor of New Jersey and concurrently secretary of state of New Jersey, WCL/JD '83
- Jeff Habay – Pennsylvania House of Representative, founder of AU's Delta Tau Delta chapter, SPA/BA '88
- Lawrence Joseph Hogan – county executive of Prince George's County, Maryland, United States representative from Maryland, '65
- Yumi Hogan – First Lady of Maryland, MA '10
- Tim Huelskamp – Kansas state senator; United States representative from Kansas, SPA/PhD '95
- Hubert Horatio "Skip" Humphrey III – former Minnesota state senator and attorney general; son of Vice President Hubert Humphrey and U.S. Senator Muriel Humphrey
- Pam Iorio – mayor of Tampa, Florida
- Christopher Jacobs – former secretary of state of New York, 2006 candidate for lieutenant governor
- Jason Kander – former Missouri secretary of state
- Rob Kauffman – Pennsylvania House representative, SPA/BA
- John A. Locke – Massachusetts House representative
- Sue Lowden – chairwoman of the Nevada Republican Party
- Neale Lunderville – former Vermont secretary of Transportation and secretary of Administration, SPA/BA
- Marc Malon – Maine state representative, BA '05 MA '07
- Jack Martins – New York state senator, SPA/BA '88
- Eileen Melvin – former chairwoman of the Republican State Committee of Pennsylvania, CEO of United Metal Fabricators, SPA/MPA
- Phil Mendelson – Washington, D.C., City Council chairman, BA
- Clinton Miller – former Virginia state delegate and judge on the Virginia State Corporation Commission
- Rebecca Millett – member of the Maine House of Representatives, BA, BS
- Howard Mills III – New York Legislature, former New York State superintendent of Insurance; 2004 United States Senate candidate, SPA '88
- David Moon – member of the Maryland House of Representatives, WCL/JD '04
- Kathleen Murphy – Virginia state delegate
- Mary Murphy – Minnesota House representative
- Brianne Nadeau – Washington, D.C., city council member from Ward 1, SPA/MPP '06
- Sam Olens – attorney general of Georgia
- Kirill Reznik – Maryland House delegate, SIS/MA'98, WCL/JD '03
- Eric Roe – member of the Pennsylvania House of Representatives, SPA/BA '10
- Gary Schaer – member of the New Jersey General Assembly
- Briana Sewell – member of the Virginia House of Delegates, SPA/MPA
- Chris Sgro – former member of the North Carolina House of Representatives
- Allison Silberberg – mayor of Alexandria, Virginia, SIS/BA
- Luiz R. S. Simmons – state delegate, Maryland House of Delegates, SIS/BA '70, WCL/JD '74
- Linda Stender – New Jersey state assemblywoman and Congressional candidate
- Richard Tisei – minority leader of the Massachusetts Senate, Massachusetts House representative; Republican nominee for lieutenant governor in the 2010 Massachusetts gubernatorial election, BA '84
- Mitch Toryanski – Idaho state senator
- David Vieira – member of the Massachusetts House of Representatives
- Helene Weinstein – member of the New York State Assembly, CAS/BA
- Melissa Wells – member of the Maryland House of Delegates, SPA/MPP
- Mary Margaret Whipple – Virginia State Senate Democratic Caucus chair
- Steve Wieckert – Wisconsin state assemblyman, BA, MA
- Jheanelle Wilkins – member of the Maryland House of Delegates, MPA
- Sandra Worthen – member of the Delaware House of Representatives, BA '58
- Drew Wrigley – lieutenant governor of North Dakota, WCL/JD
- Eugene Yaw – Pennsylvania state senator, J.D. '73

=== Business and economy ===
- Charles T. Akre – investor, financier and businessman
- Adrienne Arieff – entrepreneur and author
- Jordan Belfort – convicted of securities fraud, founded Stratton Oakmont which inspired the film Boiler Room; author of The Wolf of Wall Street and Catching the Wolf of Wall Street, CAS/BS '84
- Walter E. Boomer – president and CEO of Rogers Corporation; retired four-star General, BS '73
- Alan S. Chartock – president and CEO of WAMC Northeast Public Radio Network, MA
- Michael Chasen – co-founder, president, CEO and director of Blackboard Inc.
- Richard T. Clark – president and CEO of Merck & Co., KSB/MBA '70
- Gary Cohn – president and COO, Goldman Sachs, KSB/BSBA '82
- Louis Dubin – New York City real estate developer; president and CEO of Athena Group, WCL/JD
- Sulaiman al-Fahim – CEO of UAE-based Hydra Properties and former chairman of Manchester City F.C.
- Jeffrey Gedmin – president of Radio Free Europe/Radio Liberty, CAS/BA, CAS/MA
- Avram Glazer – owner of the Tampa Bay Buccaneers, co-chairman of Manchester United football club; president and CEO of the Zapata Corporation, WCL/JD '85
- Bryan Glazer – owner of the Tampa Bay Buccaneers, SOC/BA '86
- Joel Glazer – owner of the Tampa Bay Buccaneers, SPA/BA '89
- Marco Gobbetti – CEO of Givenchy SA, president and managing director of Céline SA, former CEO of Moschino, KSB/BSBA
- Koba Gvenetadze – governor of the National Bank of Georgia
- Patricia Harrison – president and CEO of the Corporation for Public Broadcasting, Co-chair of the Republican National Committee, SIS
- Daniel J. Hilferty – CEO of Comcast Spectacor, former president and CEO of Independence Blue Cross, SPA/MPA '81
- Wilbert Hopper – president and CEO of Petro-Canada, BS
- Jesse Itzler – vice chairman of Marquis Jet; former Billboard Hot 100 rapper, BA
- Tom Karsch – executive vice president and general manager, Turner Classic Movies
- Michael Kempner – founder and CEO of MikeWorldWide; Member of the U.S. Agency for Global Media, SPA/BS '81
- Shahal M. Khan – owner of Plaza Hotel and venture capitalist
- Robert P. Kogod – president of Archstone Real Estate company, KSB/BSBA '62
- Thomas G. Labrecque – former president, CEO, and COO of Chase Manhattan Bank, KSB/MBA
- David Lereah – chief economist of the National Association of Realtors; executive vice president of Move Inc., KSB/BA
- Ross Levinsohn – media executive who has worked in media and technology, SOC/BA '85
- M. Peter McPherson – director of Dow Jones, president of Michigan State University, director of USAID, WCL/JD '69
- Jean-Luc Migué – Canadian economist, senior fellow at the Fraser Institute and the Montreal Economic Institute, CAS/PhD '68
- Lawrence Mishel – president of the Economic Policy Institute, CAS/MA
- Erik Mollatt – CEO of M. Peterson & Søn, KSB/BSBA '67
- Mark Murphy – president and CEO of the Green Bay Packers, former player for the Washington Redskins, KSB/MBA '83.
- David Nason – Assistant Secretary for Financial Institutions under Treasury Secretary Henry M. Paulson; key architect of the federal response to the 2008 financial crisis, KSB/BSBA '92, WCL/JD '95
- Vincent Obsitnik – president of the Systems Development Division at Unisys, vice president, International at Litton Industries; United States Ambassador to Slovakia; KSB/MBA
- Mollie Orshansky – economist and statistician; developed the Orshansky Poverty Thresholds
- Terence M. O'Sullivan, Jr. – general president, Laborers' International Union of North America KSB/BSBA '74
- Matthew Pritzker – investor and businessperson, member of the Pritzker family
- Steven Rales – billionaire businessman; co-founder of Danaher Corporation, WCL/JD '78
- Arthur F. Ryan – CEO of Prudential Financial
- Bill Sweeney – CEO of International Foundation for Electoral Systems, former deputy chairman of the Democratic National Committee, SPA/BA
- Marilyn Ware – CEO of American Water, ambassador of the United States to Finland

=== Sports, entertainment, and media ===
==== Reporters and journalists ====
- Charly Arnolt – WWE, OutKick, ESPN, and Fox News personality
- Natasha Barrett – talk show host and reporter for WJLA-TV in Washington, DC, SOC/BA '00
- Jarrett Bellini – humorist, host of CNN.com video podcast News of the Absurd, SOC '01
- Alisyn Camerota – CNN anchor, SOC/BA '88
- Neil Cavuto – Fox News commentator, WCL
- Craig Crawford – columnist for Congressional Quarterly
- Steve Daley – former national political correspondent for the Chicago Tribune
- Pauline Frederick – pioneering woman in American journalism; writer for the United States News and North American Newspaper Alliance, reporter for ABC Radio and correspondent for ABC TV, BA '30, MA
- Steven Goff – sportswriter for The Washington Post, '88
- David Gregory – Meet the Press moderator, NBC News, SIS
- Johnny Harris – independent journalist and YouTuber, former Vox correspondent, MA '16
- Florence King – conservative social commentator and writer for the National Review, and best-selling author
- Jackie Kucinich – Washington bureau chief for The Daily Beast and CNN commentator, SOC/BA
- Rick Leventhal – former Fox News Channel senior correspondent, SOC/BA '86
- Louis Lomax – first African-American television journalist, CAS/MA '44
- Betsy Martin – Meet the Press executive producer, NBC News; Emmy award winner, SPA/BA '92, SPA/MA '96
- Barry McCaffrey – NBC News and MSNBC military analyst; drug czar under President Bill Clinton; retired US Army General
- Peter G. Miller -- Harper & Row author and veteran columnist
- Ayman Mohyeldin – correspondent for Al Jazeera English
- Asra Nomani – Indian-American Muslim journalist, author and feminist, '90
- Tara Palmeri – Politico reporter and columnist; ABC contributor
- Tony Perkins – weatherman for WTTG in Washington, D.C., SOC/BA '81
- Nicole Petallides – Fox Business Network anchor and correspondent, SOC '93
- Emily Rooney – executive producer, ABC News' World News Tonight with Peter Jennings
- Jeffrey St. Clair – editor of CounterPunch
- Omar Samad – former CNN analyst, Ambassador of Afghanistan to Canada
- Antoine Sanfuentes – vice president and managing editor for CNN's Washington Bureau, CAS/BA '90
- Steve Scully – host, political editor, and senior producer of C-SPAN's Washington Journal
- Tom Shales – The Washington Post TV critic; 1988 Pulitzer Prize for Criticism recipient, SOC/BA ’67
- Abbi Tatton – Internet reporter for CNN, MA
- Cal Thomas – panelist for Fox News Watch on Fox News Channel
- Desson Thomson – The Washington Post film critic, White House speechwriter for President Barack Obama, SOC/BA ’80
- Cecilia Vega – ABC anchor and White House correspondent, SOC/BA '99.
- Rohit Vyas – first and longest-serving Indian American journalist
- Brian Wilson – anchor reporter for Fox News, SOC/MA
- Trey Yingst – foreign correspondent for Fox News SOC/BA '16
- Susan Zirinsky – CBS News president

==== Cinema, television, and radio ====
- Caroline Aaron – actress and producer
- Alex Albrecht – co-host of Revision3's Diggnation, former host of The Screen Savers on G4techTV
- Aamir Ali – Indian television actor, BA
- Bryan Callen – actor and comedian, original cast of comedians on the sketch comedy television series, MADtv, CAS
- Neil Canton – film producer, Back to the Future franchise, SPA/BA '70
- Ruth Sacks Caplin – screenwriter of Mrs. Palfrey at the Claremont, master's of counseling and therapy 1977
- Elizabeth Chomko – actress, director and screenwriter (What They Had), BA 2004
- Bob Edwards – radio host and award-winning journalist; host of The Bob Edwards Show; former host of NPR's All Things Considered
- Hallie Eisenberg – the "Pepsi" Girl and actress in Paulie, SIS '14
- Jamie Fly – president and CEO of Radio Free Europe/Radio Liberty, SIS/BA
- Bo Gritz – radio host; United States Army Special Forces officer during the Vietnam War
- Gale Harold – actor, Showtime's Queer as Folk, Fox's Vanished (no degree)
- Goldie Hawn – Academy Award-winning film actress, director and producer (dropped out)
- Clark Howard – host of the nationally syndicated radio show, The Clark Howard Show, SPA/BA '76
- Star Jones – television personality, lawyer and author; former co-host of The View, former assistant district attorney in New York SPA/BA '83
- Barry Josephson – film producer; former music manager, produced Enchanted; nominated for 3 Oscars
- Andrea Kalin – independent filmmaker, SPA/BA
- Christopher Leggett – film producer
- Barry Levinson – film director, Rain Man, SOC '67
- Nancy Meyers – film writer and director, SOC '71
- Robert Morton – Emmy Award-winning TV producer, executive producer of Late Night with David Letterman
- Mike O'Meara – host of Mike O'Meara Show; former co-host of Don and Mike Show, nationally syndicated radio show
- Giuliana Rancic – celebrity news personality; co-host, E! network's E! News Live alongside Ryan Seacrest, SOC/MA
- Social Repose – singer, songwriter, and YouTube personality, SOC '12
- Maggie Rodriguez – co-anchor of CBSs The Early Show
- Khadija al-Salami – first female Yemeni film producer; press and cultural attaché and director of the Yemeni Information Centre at the Embassy of Yemen in Paris, SOC '90
- Benjamin Salisbury – actor, The Nanny
- Willard Scott – NBC's Today Show
- Judy Sheindlin – former New York family court prosecutor and judge; lawyer; television court show judge, Judge Judy, SPA/BA '63

==== Sports ====
- David Aldridge – TNT sportscaster and columnist; former journalist for The Washington Post, co-host of The Tony Kornheiser Show
- Nur B. Ali – Pakistani American racing driver in the ARCA Racing Series, SIS/BA '98
- James "Bus" Cook – NFL sports agent
- Gabriella Csépe – swimmer at the 1988 and 1992 Olympics
- Jamie Erdahl – CBS Sports / SEC on CBS sideline reporter
- Steve Farr – MLB baseball player, reliever on 1985 world champion Kansas City Royals
- Steven Goldstein – Latin American racing driver, Formula 2000 champion, KSB/BA
- Savannah Graybill – skeleton racer who competes on the Skeleton World Cup circuit, BA/SOC '10
- Frank Herzog – voice of the Washington Redskins 1979–2004, longtime sportscaster and TV personality in Washington, D.C.
- Frederik Hviid – swimmer at the 1996 and 2000 Olympics
- Andre Ingram – NBA G League/NBA Lakers point guard
- Sam Iorio (born 1998) – American-Israeli basketball player in the Israeli Basketball Premier League
- Avery John – Trinidadian football player, who currently plays as a defender for the New England Revolution of Major League Soccer and the Trinidad and Tobago national football team, KSB '99
- Kurt Kuykendall – retired goalkeeper who played professionally in the North American Soccer League
- Howard Lassoff (1955–2013) – American-Israeli basketball player
- Sergio López Miró – swimmer at the 1988 Olympics, placing third in the 200 meters breaststroke
- Mark Murphy – president and CEO of the Green Bay Packers, free safety with the Washington Redskins 1977–84, KSB/MBA '83
- Arthur Perry – basketball player and coach
- Mohammed bin Sulayem – UAE racing driver champion, SPA/BA
- R. V. Truitt – first head lacrosse coach at the University of Maryland; National Lacrosse Hall of Fame inductee, MS '21, PhD '29
- Kermit Washington – NBA basketball player with five teams, Associated Press 1st team All-American 1972–73, first-round draft choice of the Los Angeles Lakers 1973
- Ron Weber – original voice of the Washington Capitals 1974–97, honored in the broadcasters' wing at the Hockey Hall of Fame
- Warner Wolf – longtime radio and TV sportscaster in Washington and New York

=== Law ===
- Arthur Monty M. Ahalt – circuit court judge, Prince George's County, Maryland; founder and CEO of VirtualCourthouse.com, WCL/JD '67
- Terrence Boyle – federal judge of the United States District Court for the Eastern District of North Carolina; nominee for the United States Court of Appeals for the Fourth Circuit (US Senate confirmation vote pending), WCL/JD
- Michael Cohen – lawyer and spokesperson for President Donald Trump, BA 1988
- Abre' Conner, Director of the Center for Environmental and Climate Justice at the NAACP
- Adrian Cronauer – lawyer and former radio disc jockey, inspiration for the film Good Morning, Vietnam
- Charles Bernard Day – magistrate judge; withdrawn Obama Administration nominee to the United States District Court for the District of Maryland, WCL/JD
- Susan Tsui Grundmann – lawyer and member of the Federal Labor Relations Authority
- Claude M. Hilton – federal judge for the United States District Court for the Eastern District of Virginia, WCL/JD '66
- Henry E. Hudson – federal judge on the United States District Court for the Eastern District of Virginia, BA '69, WCL/JD '74
- Hubert Horatio "Skip" Humphrey III – Minnesota's 27th attorney general and former state senator; son of Vice President Hubert Humphrey and U.S. Senator Muriel Humphrey
- Juliane Kokott – advocate general at the European Court of Justice
- Stephen Latchford – aviation expert and lawyer; diplomat during the administrations of Roosevelt and Truman
- Gerald Bruce Lee – United States District Court judge, Eastern District of Virginia CAS/BA '73, WCL/JD '76
- Sharon Prost – federal judge on the United States Court of Appeals for the Federal Circuit, WCL/JD '79
- Irma S. Raker – Maryland Court of Appeals judge, WCL/JD '72
- Warren M. Silver – Maine Supreme Judicial Court justice, WCL '73
- Adam Streisand – trial attorney notable for litigation over prominent celebrity estates, WCL/JD
- Reggie Walton – federal judge on the United States District Court for the District of Columbia, WCL/JD '74
- Stanley Woodward – lawyer

=== Arts, sciences, academia, and literature ===
- Virginia Cleaver Bacon – Oregon State Librarian, MA '24
- Ann Beattie – author and educator; 1978 Guggenheim Fellow, CAS/BA '69
- Jeannette Benavides – Costa Rican nanotechnologist and physical chemist: worked at NASA
- Max Berre – EU-based policy economist specializing in finance, valuation, and sovereign risk. SIS '05
- Ilan Berman – vice president of the American Foreign Policy Council
- Jon Bowermaster – oceans expert, six-time National Geographic Expeditions Council grantee, SPA/MA '77
- Jeffrey T. Bury – political scientist and geographer; professor of Environmental Studies at University of California, Santa Cruz, SIS/MA '95
- Joe Chambers – artist
- Eleanor Coerr – author of Sadako and the Thousand Paper Cranes, CAS/BA
- Robin Davis – historian, rock bassist
- Miguel A. De La Torre – professor of Social Ethics and Latino Studies at Iliff School of Theology, SPA/MA
- Amos Eiran – Israeli president of the University of Haifa
- John Fahey – guitarist and composer
- Murray Feshbach – Cold War era scholar of Demographics of the Soviet Union and later Demographics of Russia; Sovietologist-in-residence, in the Office of the Secretary General of NATO and senior scholar at the Woodrow Wilson Center, PhD
- Reuben Fink – Yiddish journalist and author
- Lynn Franklin – literary agent and writer
- Ann B. Friedman – founder of Planet Word, a language arts museum in Washington, D.C., '1998
- Adriane Fugh-Berman – professor in the department of pharmacology and physiology at Georgetown University Medical Center, CAS/BA
- Nick Galifianakis – cartoonist for The Washington Post; cousin of comedian Zach Galifianakis
- Dominic Giampaolo – software engineer, developed the Be File System, CAS
- Jeff Gill – professor of Political Science at Washington University in St. Louis, SPA/PhD '96
- Edmund Gordon – scholar of African American studies; professor of Psychology Emeritus of Yale University and interim dean at Teachers College, Columbia University, CAS/MA
- Bhante Henepola Gunaratana – Sri Lankan Buddhist monk and philosopher, author of Mindfulness in Plain English
- K. David Harrison – linguist, director of research at the Living Tongues Institute for Endangered Languages
- Frederick Hart – sculptor noted for his public monuments and works in bronze, marble, and clear acrylic
- Donald Harward – philosopher, president of Bates College
- Michael Hendricks – psychologist, suicidologist, and an advocate for the LGBT community
- Mimi Herbert – painter and sculptor, CAS/MA '83
- Davoud Hermidas-Bavand – Iranian intellectual; political scientist, SIS/PhD '63
- Solange Hertz – Catholic author
- Carol M. Highsmith – photographer and author who donated her life's work of more than 100,000 images to the Library of Congress, which established a rare one-person archive for her work
- Jesse Itzler – Billboard Hot 100 rapper; vice chairman of Marquis Jet, BA
- Ronald Jensen – mathematician active in Europe, working in mathematical logic and set theory, CAS/BA '59
- Robert Kagan – Carnegie Endowment for International Peace Scholar and The Washington Post columnist, PhD
- Stephen A. Kent – sociologist and researcher of new and alternative religions in Canada; professor of Sociology at the University of Alberta, CAS/MA '73
- Cornelius M. Kerwin – president of American University, SPA/BA '71
- Florence King – novelist, BA '57
- Susan Cohn Lackman – composer of contemporary classical music; professor of Music Theory and Composition at Rollins College, CAS/MA
- Matthew Lesko – author on government grants
- Vanessa Lillie – novelist
- Greg Lukianoff – president of the Foundation for Individual Rights in Education
- Arnošt Lustig – Czech author and Holocaust survivor
- William Moulton Marston – inventor and cartoonist, invented the polygraph and produced Wonder Woman
- Edith T. Martin – artist and museum professional
- Dan Mathews – senior vice president of PETA; author of Committed: A Rabble-Rouser's Memoir
- Mariana Matthews – Chilean photographer, curator, and visual artist
- M. Peter McPherson – president of Michigan State University; director of the USAID program under President Ronald Reagan; director of Dow Jones, WCL/JD '69
- Mishlawi – American-Portuguese rapper
- Valentine Moghadam – feminist scholar, sociologist, activist, and author; professor of Sociology and Director of the Women's Studies Program at Purdue University, CAS/PhD '86
- Severino Montano – Philippine playwright, director, actor and theater organizer; dean of Instruction of the Philippine Normal University, CAS/MA, SPA/PhD
- Dambisa Moyo – economist and author of New York Times best seller Dead Aid: Why Aid Is Not Working And How There Is a Better Way for Africa CAS/BS, KSB/MBA
- Michael M. Naydan – literary scholar and translator, academic at the Pennsylvania State University, BA, MA
- Susan B. Neuman – literacy researcher, educator and author; US Assistant Secretary of Elementary and Secondary Education, BA '68
- Asra Nomani – journalist, author, feminist and activist in the Muslim reform and Islamic feminist movements; professor of Journalism at Georgetown University, SOC/MA '90
- Lisa Norris – author; professor of English and Creative Writing at Central Washington University, CAS/MFA
- John P. O'Neill – counter-terrorism expert and Special Agent in Charge in the Federal Bureau of Investigation; head of security of the World Trade Center and killed in the September 11, 2001 attacks, CAS/BA '74
- Anne-Imelda Radice – art historian and museum director
- Kathy Reichs – author and forensic anthropologist CAS/BA '91
- Stanley Renshon – psychoanalyst and professor of Political Science at the Graduate Center of the City University of New York, SIS/MA
- Monica Richards – singer, songwriter, artist and writer known within the gothic subculture
- Henry Rollins – vocalist, Black Flag (attended in 1979, but did not graduate)
- Montserrat Sagot – sociologist
- Bruce Schneier – author, leading internet security advisor
- Margo Seibert – Drama Desk Award-nominated actress; the original Adrian in Rocky the Musical on Broadway
- Zaid Shakir – Western scholar of Islam, SIS/BA
- Donna Shalala – president of the University of Miami, former United States Secretary of Health and Human Services
- Alice Sheldon – novelist, BA '59
- Leo Suryadinata – Chinese Indonesian sinologist; professor of Political Science at the National University of Singapore; director of the Chinese Heritage Center at Nanyang Technological University, PhD
- Dana Thomas – author of the New York Times bestseller Deluxe: How Luxury Lost Its Luster
- Ernest Thompson – playwright, actor, Academy Award winner, CAS '71
- George S. Tolley – agricultural economist at the University of Chicago, CAS/BA '47
- Jagath Weerasinghe – Sri Lankan contemporary artist
- Tanekeya Word – artist
- Oliver Reynolds Wulf – chemist and physicist; 1932 Guggenheim Fellowship recipient, MS '22

=== Other ===
- Maria Butina – Russian activist and convicted spy
- Jack Douglass – YouTuber
- Yannis Pappas – stand-up comedian and podcaster
- Matthew Pittinsky – entrepreneur and academic
- Richard L. Schlegel – LGBT rights activist

== Notable faculty and staff ==
This is a list of notable AU professors and staff, past and present, in alphabetical order.

=== Politicians and public servants ===
- Akbar S. Ahmed – former ambassador of Pakistan to the United Kingdom
- Anita Alpern – former assistant commissioner of the Internal Revenue Service
- Walter K. Andersen – United States Department of State Analyst and specialist in Indian and Indian Ocean affairs
- Ed Bliss – editor, copywriter and producer for Edward R. Murrow and Walter Cronkite, founder of the broadcast journalism program at American University
- Nancie Caraway – First Lady of Hawaii; political scientist, feminist and author
- Joe Clark – prime minister of Canada between June 4, 1979, and March 3, 1980
- Max Cleland – former United States senator from Georgia
- Silvia Fernández de Gurmendi – Argentinian lawyer, diplomat and judge; International Criminal Court judge
- Abe Fortas – former associate justice of the Supreme Court of the United States
- James Fyfe – police administrator and lieutenant in the New York Police Department; noted academic in criminology
- Edward M. Glick – public affairs officer for the United States Department of State; professor of Communications
- Claudio Grossman – chair of the United Nations Committee Against Torture; dean emeritus of the Washington College of Law
- Frank William La Rue – UN Special Rapporteur; 2004 Nobel Peace Prize nominee
- Robert Lehrman – former White House chief speechwriter for Vice President Al Gore; novelist
- Allan Lichtman – historian, 2006 candidate for Maryland State Senate, Department of History
- Charles Malik – former president of the United Nations Economic and Social Council
- Anita McBride – Chief of Staff to the First Lady of the United States (2005–2009)
- Constance Morella – United States representative from Maryland; Ambassador in Residence for the Women & Politics Institute
- Hamid Mowlana – former professor, adviser to President Mahmoud Ahmadinejad of Iran
- Ralph Nader – political activist, author, lecturer, and attorney; five-time candidate for President of the United States, including as Green Party nominee in 1996 and 2000
- Jackie Norris – political scientist; chief of staff under First Lady Michelle Obama
- Manfred Nowak – Austrian human rights lawyer; Austrian delegate to the United Nations Commission on Human Rights
- Susan Orr – commissioner of the United States Children's Bureau
- Robert Pastor – United States National Security Advisor on Latin America and the Caribbean
- Anthony C. E. Quainton – United States Ambassador to the Central African Empire, Kuwait, Nicaragua, and Peru; United States coordinator for Counterterrorism
- Jim Ramstad – United States representative from Minnesota
- Egon Ranshofen-Wertheimer – United Nations diplomat; journalist; doctor of laws
- Jamie Raskin – United States representative from Maryland, former Maryland state senator
- Susan Rice – former U.S. ambassador to the United Nations; former U.S. national security advisor
- Jehan Sadat – First Lady of Egypt; wife of President Anwar Sadat
- Sally Shelton-Colby – deputy assistant undersecretary of state for Latin America; United States ambassador to the Caribbean; assistant administrator for USAID; deputy secretary general of the OECD; wife of Director of the Central Intelligence Agency William Colby

=== Nobel laureates ===
- Herbert Spencer Gasser – 1944 Nobel Prize in Physiology or Medicine
- Robert S. Mulliken – 1966 Nobel Prize in Chemistry

=== Fulbright Scholars ===
- Patricia Aufderheide – film, video and radio academic
- Naomi Baron – author; president of the Semiotic Society of America; professor of Linguistics
- C. Stanley Lewis – artist and art professor
- Stephen Silvia – professor, School of International Service; affiliate professor, Department of Economics

=== Guggenheim Fellows ===
- Patricia Aufderheide – 1994 recipient; film, video and radio academic
- Naomi Baron – author; president of the Semiotic Society of America; professor of Linguistics
- Laura Beers – historian and author
- Robert Griffith – 1980 recipient; historian; author
- Michael Kazin – historian and author
- C. Stanley Lewis – artist and art professor
- Richard McCann – fiction, nonfiction and poetry writer
- Julian Simon – environmental economics academic and author

=== Pulitzer Prize recipients ===
- David Garrow – 1987 Pulitzer Prize for Biography
- Henry S. Taylor – 1986 Pulitzer Prize for Poetry

=== Other ===
- Alida Anderson – author and researcher at American University School of Education
- Kenneth Anderson – research fellow at the Hoover Institution of Stanford University, professor of Law
- George Ayittey – president of the Free Africa Foundation; political economics professor
- Robert Bausch – fiction writer, novelist and 2009 Dos Passos Prize in Literature; author of Almighty Me, released in film as Bruce Almighty
- Upendra Baxi – legal scholar; vice chancellor of the University of Delhi, honorary director (Research) of the Indian Law Institute and president of the Indian Society of International Law
- Betty T. Bennett – dean, College of Arts and Sciences (1985–1997) and professor of Literature
- Michael Berenbaum – Holocaust scholar, writer and filmmaker; deputy director of the President's Commission on the Holocaust; project director of the United States Holocaust Memorial Museum
- Richard E. Berendzen – Department of Physics professor, dean of the College of Arts and Sciences
- Barbara Bergmann – feminist economics academic; professor emerita of economics
- Alan Berman – psychologist, psychotherapist, and suicidologist
- Julian Bond – chairman of NAACP; distinguished professor in residence, Department of Government, School of Public Affairs
- David Bosco – journalist; author; assistant professor of international politics
- Richard Breitman – Distinguished Professor of History, American University
- Norma Broude – art historian and feminist scholar, professor emerita
- James B. Conant – president of Harvard University; chemist
- Laura DeNardis – author and Internet governance scholar; School of Communications Professor
- Elizabeth Eisenstein – author and historian on the French Revolution and early printing
- Samih Farsoun – founding dean of the College of Arts and Sciences at the American University of Sharjah and the American University of Kuwait; professor emeritus of sociology
- Charles B. Ferster – Department of Psychology, behavioral psychologist, co-author with B. F. Skinner of Schedules of Reinforcement (1957)
- Lee Francis – Laguna Pueblo-Anishinaabe poet and educator; professor and interim director of Native American Studies department and the American Studies program
- Herbert Fuchs – former member of various communist cells during the 1930s and 1940s; professor of Law
- Mary Garrard – art historian and feminist scholar, professor emerita
- Walter Gautschi – mathematician and expert in numerical analysis
- Edmund Ghareeb – author and expert on the Kurds, Iraq, and media issues; professor of Middle East history and politics
- Lesley Gill – Latin America researcher and author; Department of Anthropology
- Louis W. Goodman – dean emeritus of the School of International Service
- Ross Gunn – nuclear physicist; principal in the Manhattan Project and the United States' nuclear submarine program
- Jane Hall – former Los Angeles Times reporter, Fox News Watch panelist; School of Communications
- Consuelo Hernández – Latin America scholar and poet; professor of Latin American Studies
- Cheryl Holcomb-McCoy – dean, American University School of Education
- Andrew Holleran – author, Creative Writing Program
- Louis C. Hunter – professor of economic history; author of Steamboats on the Western Rivers, an Economic and Technological History
- Victor Kamber – labor union activist and political consultant
- Mary King – political scientist and expert in peace and conflict resolution; Distinguished Scholar, Center of Global Peace
- Ellis O. Knox – desegregation champion and chairman of Education for the NAACP; professor of Education
- Iris Krasnow – School of Communications, academic director of Washington Journalism Semester
- Stephen G. Kurtz – historian, principal of Phillips Exeter Academy
- Charles R. Larson – US scholar of African literature
- Jennifer L. Lawless – political scientist
- William Leap – department chair of Anthropology
- William M. LeoGrande – dean of the School of Public Affairs and professor in the Department of Government
- Charles Lewis – former investigative producer for ABC News and CBS's 60 Minutes; founder of the Center for Public Integrity; School of Communications professor and executive editor of the Investigative Reporting Workshop
- Andrew Lih – author and new media researcher; professor in the School of Communication
- Michael Lindsay, 2nd Baron Lindsay of Birker – academic; professor of Far Eastern Studies
- Eugene Lukacs – statistician and Director of Statistics in the Office of Naval Research
- Charles F. Marsh – economist; academic; president of Wofford College
- Colman McCarthy – journalist; peace activist; columnist for The Washington Post
- Howard E. McCurdy – expert on space policy and NASA; Charles A. Lindbergh Chair in Aerospace History; professor of Public Affairs
- Pamela Nadell – former president of the Association for Jewish Studies (2015–2017); scholar of Jewish-American Women's History; Patrick Clendenen Chair in Women's and Gender History
- Candice Nelson – political theorist, director of the Campaign Management Institute recipient (former professor)
- Karen O'Connor – political scientist, Department of Government
- Katja Oxman – German-born American visual artist
- Marshall Poe – historian and author on the Grand Duchy of Moscow
- Arturo C. Porzecanski – Distinguished Economist-in-Residence; professor and program director of the MA in International Economic Relations; Wall Street veteran
- Jamin Raskin – professor, constitutional law; co-director, program on Law and Government and Marshall-Brennan Fellows Program; author of The Supreme Court versus the American People; Maryland state senator
- John M. Richardson – director of the Center for Teaching Excellence; Department of International Development
- Floyd M. Riddick – Department of Political Science
- Aubrey Eugene Robinson, Jr. – United States federal judge
- David H. Rosenbloom – distinguished professor, Department of Public Administration & Policy
- Ivan L. Rudnytsky (1919–1984) – Ukrainian-Canadian historian, political scientist, public intellectual
- Myra Sadker – educator and researcher; dean of Education
- Abdul Aziz Said – founder of the Mohammed Said Farsi Chair of Islamic Peace; founder and Director of the Center for Global Peace; School of International Service, Department of International Peace and Conflict Resolution; author; professor
- Stephen Silvia – expert on the German economy, labor markets and industrial relations; professor and director of MA in International Relations online degree
- Sally Smith – author; special education activist; founder of the Lab School of Washington for students with learning disabilities; education professor and director of the Graduate Program in Special Education 1976–2007
- Gregory H. Stanton – president of the International Association of Genocide Scholars
- Ben Stein – actor, writer, lawyer and commentator on political and economic issues
- Leonard Steinhorn – author; specialist in American politics and culture; professor of Communications
- Charles C. Tansill (1890–1964) – professor of History at American University from 1921 to 1937
- James A. Thurber – director of the Center for Congressional and Presidential Studies; professor of Government, School of Public Affairs
- Michael Tigar – criminal defense attorney noted for representing high-profile clients; professor of Law
- Lloyd Ultan – composer of contemporary classical music; professor and chairman of the Department of Music
- Sanford J. Ungar – president emeritus of Goucher College and director of Voice of America; dean of the American University School of Communication
- Vivian M. Vasquez – professor of Education; author of a dozen books
- Franak Viacorka – Belarusian political activist, filmmaker, journalist
- Perry Wallace – trial attorney at the United States Department of Justice and environmental policy advisory council of the Environmental Protection Agency; professional basketball player for the Philadelphia 76ers; first African-American varsity basketball player in the Southeastern Conference
- Celeste A. Wallander – professor; specialist on military and energy in Russia/Eurasia region; member of the Council on Foreign Relations
- Caroline F. Ware – cultural historian
- Paul R. Williams – executive director of the Public International Law & Policy Group; 2005 Nobel Peace Prize nominee; School of International Service and Washington College of Law

== Chancellors and presidents of American University ==
This is a listing of the chancellors and presidents of American University, listed together with dates of life and service, as well as concurring notable AU events.

	President	Tenure	Notable events during tenure
1.	Bishop John Fletcher Hurst	1890–1902	Ground broken to establish American University
2.	Bishop Charles Cardwell McCabe	1902–1906
3.	Franklin E. Hamilton	1907–1916	First class admitted
4.	Bishop John W. Hamilton	1916–1922	Campus turned into Camp Leach and Camp American University
5.	Lucius C. Clark	1922–1933	First undergraduates graduate
6.	Joseph M. M. Gray	1933–1941	AU becomes one of the first schools in a racially segregated city to admit African-American students
7.	Paul Douglass	1941–1952	Title changed to "president", Washington College of Law merges into AU
8.	Hurst Robins Anderson	1952–1968	Kogod School of Business and School of International Service open
9.	George H. Williams	1968–1976	Downtown location closed
10.	Joseph J. Sisco	1976–1980	Bender Library opens and School of Communication established
11.	Richard E. Berendzen	1980–1990	Major campus construction, resigns in disgrace, treated, rehired, professor emeritus in Physics Department
12.	Joseph Duffey	1991–1994
13.	Benjamin Ladner	1994–2005	Launches major capital campaign, resigns in disgrace
14.	Neil Kerwin	2005–2017	Acting president during Ladner investigation; announced as 14th president of American University on July 20, 2007, for the term beginning September 1, 2007
15.	Sylvia Burwell	2017– 2024	AU becomes first carbon neutral university in the US
16.	Jonathan Alger	2024–2026
17.	David Marchick Interim	2026-present

== Trustees ==
Notable trustees of American University, past and present:

- William Jennings Bryan – United States secretary of state under President Woodrow Wilson
- Michael D. Capellas – president and CEO of MCI
- Dwight D. Eisenhower – 34th president of the United States
- Warren G. Harding – 29th president of the United States
- Herbert Hoover – 31st president of the United States
- Robert P. Kogod – president of the Charles E. Smith real estate corporation
- William McKinley – 25th president of the United States
- Theodore Roosevelt – 26th president of the United States
- Wiley Rutledge – U.S. Supreme Court justice (WCL)
- Harry S. Truman – 33rd president of the United States
