= Nitin =

Nitin or Nithin (Devanagari: नितिन, नीतीन, or नीतिन) is a male first name in India and Nepal.

== Notable people named Nitin ==
- Nitin Bose, Indian film director
- Nitin Chandrakant Desai, Bollywood art director and production designer
- Nitin Gadkari, Indian politician, former president of the Bharatiya Janata Party
- Nitin Ganatra, British actor
- Nitin Kapoor, Indian producer
- Nitin Kushalappa, Indian author
- Nitin Mukesh, Indian singer
- Neil Nitin Mukesh, Indian actor
- Nitin Nohria, American business writer
- Nitin Pradhan, former chief information officer for the US Department of Transportation
- Nitin Rakesh, Indian businessman
- Nitin Raut, Indian politician
- Nitin Saini, Indian cricketer
- Nitin Sahrawat, Indian actor
- Nitin Sathya, Indian actor
- Nitin Sawhney, Indian-British composer and musician

== See also ==
- Nithiin (born 1983), Indian film actor and producer, predominantly in Telugu cinema
