= Tenzer =

Tenzer may refer to:

- Herbert Tenzer (1905–1993), American Democratic Party politician
- Michael Tenzer (born 1957), American composer, performer, and music educator and scholar
- Morton J. Tenzer (born 1931), American political scientist

== See also ==
- Tenzere, a folk dance
