= Pan Suk Kim =

South Korean public administration academic (born 1956)

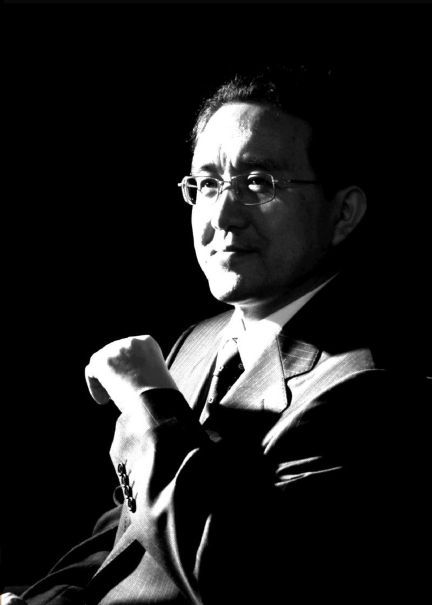
- Kim in 2007
- Education: BA from Chung-Ang University; MPA from Florida International University; PhD from American University
- Occupation: Professor
- Employer: Yonsei University

Pan Suk Kim (김판석 [金判錫]; born 1956) is a South Korean professor of public administration. He is currently professor emeritus in the Department of Global Public Administration at Yonsei University's Mirae Campus in South Korea. Since 2011, he has also been a lifetime international fellow of the National Academy of Public Administration (NAPA), a congressionally chartered, nonpartisan, nonprofit academy in Washington, D.C.

Kim's research interests include the theory and practice of public administration, public governance, and human resource management and development. He was a Fulbright Scholar in the Department of Government at Georgetown University in 2005, a visiting scholar-in-residence in the School of Public Affairs at American University in 2015, and a visiting scholar in the Trachtenberg School of Public Policy and Public Administration at George Washington University in 2020.

== Education and career ==
Kim received a BA in public administration from Chung-Ang University in 1982, an MPA from Florida International University in 1984, and a Ph.D. in public administration from American University in 1990. He was an assistant professor of public administration in the School of Public Service at Old Dominion University in Norfolk, Virginia, from 1991 to 1994. He returned to South Korea in 1994 and served as an associate professor in the Department of Public Administration at Incheon National University until 1998. He subsequently served as a professor in the Department of Global Public Administration at Yonsei University's Mirae Campus from 1998 to 2021.

Kim was named Underwood Distinguished Professor from 2010 to 2013, and served as dean of both the College of Government and Business and the Graduate School of Government and Business at Yonsei University. He was the founding director of the Institute for Poverty Alleviation and International Development (IPAID) at Yonsei University from 2010 to 2013.

== Professional associations and editorial experience ==
Kim served as president of several professional associations, including the Korean Society for Public Personnel Administration (KOSPPA, 1999–2000), the Asian Association for Public Administration (AAPA, 2014–2017), and the International Institute of Administrative Sciences (IIAS, 2010–2013). He also served as international director of the American Society for Public Administration for two consecutive three-year terms, from the spring of 2020 to the spring of 2026.

Kim served as editor-in-chief of the International Review of Public Administration, published by the Korean Association for Public Administration;; the Korean Policy Studies Review (KPSR), published by the Korean Association for Policy Studies; and the Asian Review of Public Administration (ARPA), published by the Eastern Regional Organization for Public Administration. He also served as deputy editor of the International Review of Administrative Sciences (IRAS), published by the International Institute of Administrative Sciences.

== Government experience ==
Kim has held several government positions. He served as chairperson of the Committee for Public Officials' Occupational Accident Compensation and Pension (공무원재해보상연금위원회) within the South Korean government from 2021 to 2024. He served as Minister of Personnel Management (MPM, 인사혁신처) of the Republic of Korea from July 2017 to December 2018. Prior to that, he served as Secretary to the President for Personnel Policy in the Office of the President from December 2003 to January 2005.

== UN experience ==
Kim served two terms as a member of the United Nations Committee of Experts on Public Administration (CEPA), from 2006 to 2009 and from 2010 to 2013. During his second term, he served as vice-chairperson of CEPA. He later served as a commission member of the International Civil Service Commission of the United Nations from 2021 to 2024.

== Selected publications ==
Kim has published over 200 refereed articles in Korean and international journals and also authored several books. He edited a number of books, including the following:

- Public Administration and Public Governance in ASEAN Member Countries and Korea (Seoul: Daeyoung, 2009)
- Civil Service System and Civil Service Reform in ASEAN Member Countries and Korea (Seoul: Daeyoung, 2010)
- Public Sector Reform in ASEAN Member Countries and Korea (Seoul: Daeyoung, 2011);
- Value and Virtue in Public Administration (UK: Palgrave Macmillan, 2014; co-edited with Michiel de Vries);
- Democratic Governance, Public Administration and Poverty Alleviation (Brussels, Belgium: Bruylant, 2015; co-edited with Demetrios Argyriades).

== Selected awards and honors ==
Kim was recognized for his contribution and received several awards, including the following:

- International Public Administration Award (2009), awarded by the American Society for Public Administration.
- Paul P. Van Riper Award for Excellence and Service (2012), awarded by the American Society for Public Administration.
- Warner W. Stockberger Achievement Award (2017), awarded by the International Public Management Association for Human Resources.
- Donald C. Stone Service to ASPA Award (2019), awarded by the American Society for Public Administration.
- Riggs Award for Lifetime Achievement in International and Comparative Public Administration (2019), awarded by the Section of International and Comparative Administration of the American Society for Public Administration.
- Lifetime Achievement Award (2024), jointly awarded by the Asian Association for Public Administration (AAPA), the Eastern Regional Organization for Public Administration (EROPA), the Asian Group for Public Administration (AGPA), and the Indonesian Association for Public Administration (IAPA).

== Bibliography ==
- Kim, B. W. and Kim, Pan Suk. 1997. Korean Public Administration: Managing the Uneven Development. Elizabeth, NJ: Hollym.
- De Vries, Michiel and Kim, Pan Suk. (eds.). 2011. Value and Virtue in Public Administration: A Comparative Perspective. London, UK: Palgrave Macmillan.
- Kim, Pan Suk and Argyriades, Demetrios. (eds.). 2015. Democratic Governance, Public Administration and Poverty Alleviation: Thematic Discourse and Geographical Cases. Brussels, Belgium: Bruylant.
