= Surrogacy in India =

Surrogacy in India and Indian surrogates became increasingly popular amongst intended parents in industrialised nations because of the relatively low costs and easy access offered by Indian surrogacy agencies. Clinics charged patients between $10,000 and $28,000 for the complete package, including fertilization, the surrogate's fee, and delivery of the baby at a hospital. Including the costs of flight tickets, medical procedures and hotels, this represented roughly a third of the price of the procedure in the UK and a fifth of that in the US. Surrogate mothers received medical, nutritional and overall health care through surrogacy agreements.

In 2005, the government approved the 2002 draft of the National Guidelines for the Accreditation, Supervision and Regulation of ART Clinics in India, in 2002. Before commercial surrogacy was banned in 2015, India was a popular destination for surrogacy. The economic scale of surrogacy in India is unknown, but a study backed by the United Nations estimated the business at more than $400 million a year, with over 3,000 fertility clinics across India.

In 2013, surrogacy by foreign homosexual couples and single parents was banned. In 2015, the government banned commercial surrogacy in India and permitted entry of embryos only for research purposes. Shortly thereafter in 2016, a Surrogacy (Regulation) Bill was introduced and passed by Lok Sabha (Lower House), the lower house of the Indian parliament, proposing to permit only heterosexual Indian couples married for at least five years with infertility problems to access altruistic or unpaid surrogacy and thereby further banning commercial surrogacy. The 2016 bill lapsed owing to the adjournment sine die of the parliament session. The bill was reintroduced and passed by the Lok Sabha in 2019. The bill would require to be passed by the Rajya Sabha (Upper House), upper house of the Indian parliament and presidential assent before it becomes an act and thereby a law.

== History ==
The legal history of commercial gestational surrogacy trace the emergence of commercial gestational surrogacy in India to the early 2000s, when assisted reproductive technologies expanded rapidly and a 2002 court decision was interpreted as legalising commercial surrogacy. Clinics and agencies began offering full “surrogacy packages” to both Indian and foreign clients, and surrogacy was promoted as part of a wider medical tourism strategy. Estimates by industry groups suggested that surrogacy generated more than US$2 billion annually, with thousands of IVF clinics across the country.

Throughout the 2000s and early 2010s, India became a major global destination for transnational commercial surrogacy, attracting heterosexual couples, single intended parents and same-sex couples from abroad. At the same time, a series of highly publicised cases including deaths of egg donors and surrogates, visa and citizenship disputes, and abandonment of children fuelled concerns about exploitation, inadequate oversight and legal uncertainty.Draft Assisted Reproductive Technology (ART) Bills were prepared in 2008, 2010 and 2014, and Indian Council of Medical Research guidelines were issued in 2005, but no comprehensive national statute on surrogacy was enacted.

From 2012 onwards, the policy direction shifted toward restriction. Visa rules for international intended parents were tightened, and in November 2015 medical visas related to surrogacy were suspended, effectively excluding foreign clients from accessing commercial surrogacy in India. In 2016 the government introduced the Surrogacy (Regulation) Bill 2016, which proposed banning commercial surrogacy altogether and permitting only altruistic surrogacy for Indian heterosexual married couples who met infertility criteria. Under this model, surrogates had to be Indian women aged 25–35, already mothers to at least one child, and “close relatives” of the commissioning couple; they could receive reimbursement of medical expenses and insurance but no other payment.

The 2016 bill was examined by the 102nd Parliamentary Standing Committee on Health and Family Welfare, which recommended changes, and subsequently lapsed. A revised Surrogacy (Regulation) Bill 2019 was passed by the Lok Sabha and referred to a Raja Sabha Select Committee. Incorporating many of that committee’s recommendations, the government introduced a further revised Surrogacy (Regulation) Bill 2020, which retained an altruistic-only framework but widened eligibility in some respects, for example by allowing certain single women (widows and divorcées aged 35–45) to access surrogacy and removing a proposed five-year minimum duration of infertility.

These legislative developments culminated in the Surrogacy (Regulation) Act 2021, which prohibits commercial surrogacy nationwide, restricts surrogacy to specified altruistic arrangements, and establishes national and state boards to regulate clinics and monitor compliance.

=== Timeline ===
2002 – Commercial surrogacy becomes legally permissible.

A High Court ruling recognized commercial gestational surrogacy (CGS) as lawful, enabling Indian clinics to contract with intended parents and establishing the foundation of the modern surrogacy industry.

2005 – National ART guidelines introduced (non-binding).

The Indian Council of Medical Research issued guidelines for ART clinics, recommending standards for surrogate eligibility and clinic conduct but without the force of law.

2008–2014 – Repeated ART Bills proposed but not enacted.

Draft Assisted Reproductive Technology (Regulation) Bills, introduced in 2008, revised in 2010, and again in 2014, looked to regulate clinics, contracts, and safety but remained unpassed, leaving the sector largely unregulated despite rapid growth.

2012 – Visa restrictions imposed on international surrogacy.

Following reports of medical complications, abandoned children, and cross-border custody disputes, the Ministry of Home Affairs limited medical visas for foreign intended parents, creating the first national controls on transnational surrogacy.

2015 – Complete ban on foreign intended parents.

All surrogacy-related visas were suspended, preventing non-Indian citizens from commissioning surrogacy in India and narrowing legal access to Indian heterosexual married couples.

2016 – Surrogacy (Regulation) Bill introduced.

The Bill banned commercial surrogacy entirely, restricted surrogacy to altruistic arrangements performed by a close female relative, prohibited compensation beyond medical costs, and imposed criminal penalties for violating the commercial ban.

2017 – Parliamentary Standing Committee issues critical report.

The Committee’s 102nd Report argued that the 2016 Bill was impractical, discriminatory, based on patriarchal assumptions, and likely to generate new forms of coercion within families.

2019 – Revised Surrogacy Bill passed by the Lok Sabha.

The 2019 Bill preserved the altruistic-only model and the commercial ban but was returned to the Rajya Sabha for further review after substantial criticism.

2020 – Further revisions expand commissioning eligibility.

The Surrogacy (Regulation) Bill 2020 removed the five-year infertility waiting period, permitted single Indian women (widowed or divorced) to commission surrogacy, and retained the altruistic-only requirement.

2021 – Surrogacy (Regulation) Act enacted.

The Act formalized a nationwide altruistic-only system, prohibited compensated surrogacy, and established National and State Surrogacy Boards, although analysts note continuing gaps in surrogate protection and enforcement.

Post-2021 – Shift toward informal and cross-border markets.

With commercial surrogacy banned, clinics and brokers sometimes facilitate arrangements in other jurisdictions or private networks, raising concerns about unregulated practices and heightened risk to surrogates.

== Demographics of Indian Surrogates ==
One of the few quantitative studies on Indian surrogate mothers analysed four cross-sectional field studies conducted between 2006 and 2014, producing a convenience sample of 96 Indian surrogates recruited through clinics, agencies and brokers. Their characteristics were compared with those of women aged 20–34 in the National Family Health Survey.

Most surrogates in the study were married, aged 21–35, and had one or two children. They tended to become mothers at a younger age than the general population but ultimately had smaller families. In contrast to common assumptions, the sample showed relatively higher socioeconomic indicators: 56% had at least secondary schooling, 58% had been employed before surrogacy, and 71% lived above the $2USD/day poverty line, compared with only 24% of Indian women nationally in the same age range.

The authors conclude that these surrogates were not typically from the poorest and least educated groups, but often from lower- or lower-middle-income households with relatively greater social mobility. This data was however derived from a non-random convenience sample dependent on clinic cooperation, so the findings may not reflect all surrogate populations in India.

== Judicial Pronouncements ==
=== Baby Manji Yamada v. Union of India (2008) ===
In 2008, a baby (Manji Yamada) born through surrogacy was unable to leave India for three months after her birth because she held neither Indian nor Japanese nationality. The case came before the Supreme Court of India. The issue was resolved after the Japanese government issued a one-year visa to her on humanitarian grounds. The Japanese government issued the visa after the Indian government granted the baby a travel certificate in September 2008 in line with a Supreme Court direction.

=== Jan Balaz v. Anand Municipality and ors. (2009) ===
In 2009 in Jan Balaz v. Anand Municipality and ors., the Gujarat High Court conferred Indian citizenship on two twin babies fathered through compensated surrogacy by a German national in Anand district. The court observed: "We are primarily concerned with the rights of two newborn, innocent babies, much more than the rights of the biological parents, surrogate mother, or the donor of the ova. Emotional and legal relationship of the babies with the surrogate mother and the donor of the ova is also of vital importance." The court considered the surrogacy laws of countries like Ukraine, Japan, and the United States.

Because India does not offer dual citizenship, the children will have to convert to Overseas Citizenship of India if they also hold non-Indian citizenship. Balaz, the petitioner, submitted before the Supreme Court that he shall be submitting his passports before the Indian Consulate in Berlin. He also agreed that a NGO in Germany shall respond back to India on the status of the children and their welfare. The Union of India responded that India shall make all attempts to have the children sent to Germany. German authorities have also agreed to reconsider the case if approached by the Indian.

In May 2010, the Balaz twins were provided the exit and entry documents that allowed them to leave India for Germany. The parents agreed to adopt them in Germany according to German rules.

== Surrogacy Risk and Conditions in Indian Mothers ==
According to The Guardian, a surrogate mother died because she didn't get the proper medical attention. Conservative estimates show that more than 25,000 children are now being born through surrogates in India every year in an industry worth $2 billion. Domestic demand is increasing, but as fertility levels drop elsewhere, at least 50% of these are "commissioned" by overseas, mainly western, couples. Most of the industry is operating unchecked. India's medical research watchdog drafted regulations more than two years ago, yet they still await presentation in parliament, leaving the surrogates and baby factories open to abuse.

=== Indian Council for Medical Research guidelines ===
The Indian Council for Medical Research has given guidelines in the year 2002, approved by the government in 2005, regulating Assisted Reproductive Technology procedures. The Law Commission of India submitted the 228th report on Assisted Reproductive Technology procedures discussing the importance and need for surrogacy, and also the steps taken to control surrogacy arrangements. The following observations had been made by the Law Commission:

- Surrogacy arrangement will continue to be governed by contract amongst parties, which will contain all the terms requiring consent of surrogate mother to bear child, agreement of her husband and other family members for the same, medical procedures of artificial insemination, reimbursement of all reasonable expenses for carrying child to full term, willingness to hand over the child born to the commissioning parent(s), etc. But such an arrangement should not be for commercial purposes.
- A surrogacy arrangement should provide for financial support for surrogate child in the event of death of the commissioning couple or individual before delivery of the child, or divorce between the intended parents and subsequent willingness of none to take delivery of the child.
- A surrogacy contract should necessarily take care of life insurance cover for surrogate mother.
- One of the intended parents should be a donor as well, because the bond of love and affection with a child primarily emanates from biological relationship. Also, the chances of various kinds of child-abuse, which have been noticed in cases of adoptions, will be reduced. In case the intended parent is single, he or she should be a donor to be able to have a surrogate child. Otherwise, adoption is the way to have a child which is resorted to if biological (natural) parents and adoptive parents are different.
- Legislation itself should recognize a surrogate child to be the legitimate child of the commissioning parent(s) without there being any need for adoption or even declaration of guardian.
- The birth certificate of the surrogate child should contain the name(s) of the commissioning parent(s) only.
- Right to privacy of donor as well as surrogate mother should be protected.
- Sex-selective surrogacy should be prohibited.
- Cases of abortion should be governed by the Medical Termination of Pregnancy Act 1971 only.

== Proposed legislations ==
=== Assisted Reproductive Technology Bill, 2013 ===
The Assisted Reproductive Technology Bill 2013 has been pending for quite a while and it has not been presented in the Indian Parliament. It will not allow commercial surrogacy that involves exchange of money for anything other than paying for medical expenses for the mother and the child.

The bill would prohibit these from surrogacy: couples already having one child, foreigners or Overseas Citizens of India (OCI), holders as well as live-in-Partners, single people, homosexuals and widows. There has been significant criticism of the bill.

=== Surrogacy (Regulation) Bill, 2018 and 2012 ===
In 2016, a Surrogacy (Regulation) Bill was introduced and passed by Lok Sabha, the lower house of the Indian parliament, proposing to permit only Indian heterosexual couples married for at least five years with infertility problems to access altruistic or unpaid surrogacy and thereby banning commercial surrogacy. The 2016 bill lapsed owing to the adjournment sine die of the parliament session. The bill was reintroduced and passed by the Lok Sabha in 2019.

==== Surrogacy Bill 2019 ====
The Surrogacy Bill (Regulation) 2019 was enacted by the Minister of Health and Family Welfare on July 15, 2019. Harsh Vardhan introduced in Lok Sabha. The bill defines surrogacy as the practice of a woman intentionally handing over a child to a couple of their choice after the birth with the intention of handing the child over to a couple of their choice.

Surrogacy Regulations: This bill prohibits commercial surrogacy, but allows altruistic surrogacy. Altruistic surrogacy does not provide financial compensation to the surrogate mother other than medical expenses and insurance coverage during pregnancy. Commercial surrogacy includes surrogacy or related procedures performed for economic benefit or compensation (cash or in kind) beyond basic medical expenses and insurance coverage.

Surrogacy and Abortion: A child born through surrogacy is considered the biological child of the intended couple. Surrogate abortion requires the written consent of the surrogate mother and the approval of the competent authority. This approval must comply with the Abortion Act 1971. Additionally, a surrogate mother can decline surrogacy before the embryo has implanted in the uterus.

Violations and Penalties: Violations under this law include: (ii) exploitation of surrogate mothers; (iii) not abandon, exploit or possess the surrogate mother; (iv) selling or importing human embryos or gametes for surrogacy; Penalties for such violations are up to 10 years imprisonment and fines up to Rs.100,000. The bill sets out a number of offenses and penalties for other violations of the bill's provisions.

The bill got passed in Rajya Sabha on Dec 8, 2021.

== See also ==
- Adrienne Arieff
- Fertility tourism
- Medical tourism in India
- Surrogacy
