= Morton J. Tenzer =

American political scientist

Morton J. Tenzer (born 1931) is an American political scientist specializing public administration. He is the founder of the Master of Public Administration (MPA) Program at the University of Connecticut and was its director from 1973 to 1986. Tenzer was a member of the university's Political Science Department from 1968 to 1993.

== Early years ==
Tenzer grew up in his native New York City until age 12, when his family moved to Bridgeport, Connecticut, where he graduated from Central High School in 1949. Bridgeport was a booming industrial town during World War II; observing its social and economic life and comparing it to that of New York may have been the source of his lifelong interest in the workings of cities.

During his childhood and in later years, Tenzer enjoyed fellowship with an extended clan of relatives through the Tenzer Family Circle, established by his grandfather's brother Michael Tenzer. Several Tenzer brothers had immigrated to the US at the start of the 20th century from near Tarnów in southern Poland (then part of the Austro-Hungarian Empire).

Tenzer attended college at the University of Connecticut, initially at the Avery Point branch and then at the main Storrs campus, graduating in 1953. That year he married Virginia Copes of Watertown, Connecticut, also a UConn graduate.

== Career ==
Following graduate study at Yale, Tenzer took up a position teaching political science and government at Wesleyan University (1956–62), followed by a year at Brandeis University. He then spent a year working for the United States Civil Service Commission (a federal agency) in New York City, where he learned much about government administration.

From 1965 to 1968, Tenzer worked at the Institute of Public Administration, a policy think-tank in New York providing consultation to governments in the US and around the world. In 1966 he was involved in helping the incoming administration of New York Mayor John Lindsay to consolidate some twenty-five city human welfare agencies down to ten. He also worked on a project sponsored by Vice President Hubert Humphrey about states’ handling of shoreline management. His international projects were based in Brazil, Egypt, and Peru, and included travel to the first two countries. Because of his experience advising on real issues of governmental organization and policy, he was recruited by two of his former professors to return to UConn to teach political science.

At UConn, Tenzer joined the Political Science Department and was affiliated with the Institute of Urban Research and the Center for Oral History. His main focus, however, was a drive to establish an MPA program. In 1973 it came into being with Tenzer as its director. Under his leadership the MPA program grew to include 6 full-time faculty. Among its graduates is John DeStefano Jr., mayor of New Haven, Connecticut, from 1994 to 2014.

In addition to academic activities, Tenzer continued his consulting work and traveled overseas, helping to assess and shape policy for USAID in the Philippines; for USIS in Sri Lanka; and for local governments in the former Soviet Union, through a project of the International Institute of Administrative Sciences (Brussels).

He also visited Estonia, Israel, and Poland on professional projects.

== Service ==
Tenzer served for many years on the UConn branch of the American Association of University Professors and was part of the cadre that succeeded in bringing collective bargaining to the university. In 2004 he was awarded the AAUP's Al Sumberg Award. In addition, he was a member of the committee that established and built the UConn Coop bookstore.

His academic service includes longtime participation in the American Society for Public Administration and the International Association of Schools and Institutes of Administration. He was a member of the latter's board of governors, serving in Brussels for a semester (1991).

Tenzer also devoted time to state and local politics. Beginning in 1968, he ran a biennial orientation session for Connecticut's General Assembly, providing legislators with seminars on topics they selected, geared toward upcoming legislation. He also served for many years on the Democratic Town Committee of Mansfield, Connecticut.

== Publications ==
Tenzer's lifelong study of Connecticut's cities and towns resulted in his book, with colleague Carol W. Lewis, Connecticut’s Urban Strategy (Washington, DC: US Dept of Housing and Urban Development, 1980). He also coauthored articles on public administration, higher education, and international politics.

== Legacy ==
On his retirement, he established the Tenzer Fellowship Fund at UConn's MPA program, which provides support each year to an incoming student selected for academic excellence.
