= Alphabet to E-mail =

2000 book by Dr. Naomi Baron

- First edition
- Author: Dr. Naomi Baron
- Language: English
- Subject: Linguistics
- Published: 2000 (Routledge)
- Publication place: United States
- Media type: Print
- Pages: 316
- ISBN: 0-415-18685-4
- Dewey Decimal: 421.1
- LC Class: PE1075

Alphabet to E-mail: How Written English Evolved and Where It's Heading (ISBN 0-415-18685-4) is a book by linguist Dr. Naomi Baron, a professor of linguistics at American University, Washington, D.C. It was first published in 2000, published by Routledge Press.

In it, Baron explores the history of the English language in written form, and considers how it has evolved through its history, ending with an evaluation of the state of the English language today, and how the Internet and the use of email and text messaging has affected it.

Baron considered that email did not have an inherent writing style, and believed it was evolving to resemble speech. She also expressed her disappointment with the effect of electronic means of communication upon the written word.

Baron noted that 25-years of research revealed that:

.. people offer more accurate and complete information about themselves when filling out questionnaires using a computer than when completing the same form on paper or through a face-to-face interview. The differences were especially marked when the information at issue was personally sensitive.
