= Steven Goff =

American sportswriter

- Education: American University
- Occupation: Sportswriter
- Years active: 1985–present

Steven Goff is a sports writer for Yahoo Sports. He wrote for The Washington Post from 1985 to 2025 and covered soccer regularly since 1992. He has followed the United States men's national soccer team at five World Cups, and has covered over 100 matches for the U.S. national team. Goff has been the beat reporter on D.C. United since MLS's launch in 1996, and has covered every MLS Cup. In addition to working for the Washington Post, Goff also assisted with NBC's coverage of the 1992 Summer Olympics. In addition to his works in print, Goff also wrote the Soccer Insider blog for the Washington Post website. He accepted a buyout and his final day with the Washington Post was July 31, 2025.

Goff is regarded as one of the leading soccer journalists in the United States. Goff was inducted into the Virginia–D.C. Soccer Hall of Fame in 2013.

Goff is a native of Keene, New Hampshire, and a 1988 graduate of American University in Washington, D.C.
