= Tanekeya Word =

American artist

- Education: Howard University; American University
- Occupation: Artist

Tanekeya Word is an American visual artist, art and culture journalist, and editor-in-chief and creative director of neonV, a magazine for the contemporary peculiar woman.

== Education ==
Word entered Howard University in 2001 where she majored in English with a minor in Afro-American Studies. She received her B.A. in 2006 and her M.A. Arts Management from American University in 2011. Word's 138 page Master's thesis was on the subject of Black Philanthropy in the visual arts. Word is currently a Doctoral fellow studying the intersections of Urban Education, Art Education and thirdspace as it pertains to Black women in the arts.

== Career ==
Word began her professional art career in 2006. Her first major solo exhibition was at Harriet's Alter Ego in Brooklyn, NY and it ran from May–June 11, 2008. “Popping: The Rebirth of Fresh” featured the "Donne Di lusso Series" and was curated by Shantrelle P. Lewis. In 2013 Word returned to her artistic roots, and began mixing her love for abstract minimalism, pop art and mixed media collage into large-scale portraits on paper.

Word was originally I:V of the neonV collective co-founder, managing editor, creative & art director and literature & culture editor. On October 29, 2013, Word became I:IV of the "neonV collective"; she served as the editor-in-chief, creative director, art, literature + culture editor for the new bi-annual neonV magazine: "the magazine for the contemporary peculiar woman." The magazine publicly launched the special collector's editions: vol. I autumn/winter MMXII on December 15, 2012, and vol. II autumn/winter MMXIII on September 30, 2013. The neonV collective took a year sabbatical from printing the magazine on June 30, 2014, instead opting to launch vol. III spring/summer MMXIV on tumblr. neonVmag. The magazine is currently defunct as the co-founders branched out to work on personal projects.

Word actively contributes to documenting contemporary arts and culture, from the perspectives of African Diaspora artists, living in the United States of America, as a journalist, producing interviews. She is also one of the inaugural Art + Culture journalists for SaintHeron.com, "a new music and cultural hub featuring content from the Saint Records family. This includes interviews, profiles on a variety of new music and cultural movements as well as information on Saint Heron and Saint Records, which is creative directed by Solange Knowles.

Word is currently a doctoral fellow, visual artist, and printmaker who is working on her first children's book that she is writing and illustrating.

== Videography ==
- Milwaukee Bent: Tanekeya Word (vimeo.com)
- Art 2 Facts: Introducing Tanekeya Word

== Interviews ==
- "dime defined: tanekeya word." [2013]
- "Meet Artist Tanekeya Word" [2012]
- "Tanekeya Word-Hybrid Chic" [2011]
- "Certified Breathable | Tanekeya Word [2009]
- "BGG Chats with Tanekeya Word" [2008]

== Research and analysis on the artist's work ==
- ENG 423: Afrofuturism in Tanekeya Word's Artwork
- To Take Root Among the Stars

== Awards and recognition ==
- 2012. “#66 of The Bearden 100.” The Romare Bearden Foundation and Danny Simmons Jr.
- 2011. “Artisan Series Regional Semi-Finalist.” Rush Philanthropic Arts Foundation and Bombay Sapphire. Nationwide Competition
- 2010. “Artisan Series Regional Semi-Finalist.” Rush Philanthropic Arts Foundation and Bombay Sapphire. Nationwide Competition
