= Edith T. Martin =

American artist and museum professional

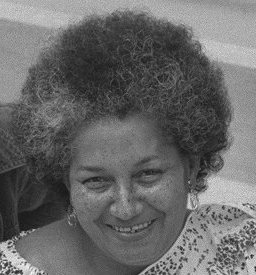
- Edith T. Martin
- Born: Caroline County, Virginia
- Education: Degree in Fine Arts
- Alma mater: American University

Edith T. Martin is an American artist and museum professional.

== Life ==
She was born in Caroline County, Virginia. She moved to Washington, D.C., where she earned a degree in Fine Arts from American University and also attended Georgetown University. She worked as an artist and museum technician at the Smithsonian American Art Museum and Renwick Gallery.

Martin was active in the arts community in Washington, D.C., and advocated for exhibitions of the work of African American women artists in particular. She was affiliated with the D.C. Art Association, the Smithsonian Institution Women's Council, the National Conference of Artists, and the Washington Women's Art Center. She was a member of the Executive Board of the National Conference of Artists. Martin's works reside in several permanent art collections in the United States.

Martin participated in and curated many exhibitions, particularly at the Anacostia Neighborhood Museum, the Smithsonian American Art Museum and the Renwick Gallery.

Martin's work on a proposed February 1979 exhibit of Black women artists, Contemporary Afro-American Women Artists, helped create an archive of artists from the period.
