= C. Stanley Lewis =

Artist and art teacher (born 1941)

C. Stanley Lewis, or Stanley Lewis (born 1941) is an artist and art teacher. He was a member of the Bowery Gallery in New York City from 1986 to 2008 and of the Oxbow Gallery in Northampton, Massachusetts. Lewis is currently represented by the Betty Cuningham Gallery in New York City.

An emeritus professor from American University, Lewis also taught at the Kansas City Art Institute from 1969 to 1986, and currently teaches part-time at the New York Studio School. In addition, Lewis has taught at Kansas City Art Institute, Smith College, and the Parsons School of Design. In 2001, he was Artist-in-Residence at Dartmouth College. "Recent group exhibitions in 2009 include the American Academy of Arts & Letters Invitational; Haverford College and Gross-McCleaf Gallery, PA." Lewis has been the recipient of many awards, including the Altman Prize, a Henry Ward Ranger Purchase Award from the National Academy of Design, and a Guggenheim Fellowship in 2005. He was also a Danforth Fellow.

There were major retrospectives of Lewis' work at the Swope Art Museum in Terre Haute, Indiana in 2024, and the American University Museum in the Katzen Arts Center in Washington, D.C. in 2007. He is a graduate of Wesleyan University and received both a BFA and an MFA from the Yale School of Art.

In a 2011 review in The Brooklyn Rail of Lewis's recent work, Ben La Rocco writes, "Lewis's paintings are questions. How can paint address the quality of light and presence of a place so as to rival the experience of the place itself?"
