= Naomi Baron =

American linguist

Naomi S. Baron (born September 27, 1946, New York, NY) is a linguist and professor emerita of linguistics at the Department of World Languages and Cultures at American University in Washington, D.C.

== Education and career ==
Baron earned a B.A. in 1968 in English and American Literature at Brandeis University, and, in 1973, a PhD in linguistics at Stanford University. Her dissertation is titled, "The Evolution of English Periphrastic Causatives: Contributions to a general theory of linguistic variation and change." She taught at Brown University, the Rhode Island School of Design, Emory University, and Southwestern University before coming to American University, where she held a position from 1987 until her retirement.

== Research interests ==
Her areas of research and interest include computer-mediated communication, writing and technology, language in social context, language acquisition and the history of English. She is also interested in language use in the computer age, instant messaging, text messaging, mobile phone practices, cross-cultural research on mobile phones, Human multitasking behavior, and Facebook online social interaction usage by American college students. She has published a number of books on these topics.

== Honors and awards ==
She was a Guggenheim Fellow, Fulbright Fellow, and president of the Semiotic Society of America.

Her book, Always On: Language in an Online and Mobile World, which was published in 2008, won the English-Speaking Union’s HRH The Duke of Edinburgh ESU English Language Book Award for 2008.

== Selected works ==
=== Books ===
- Baron, Naomi S., Reader Bot. What happens when AI Reads and why it Matters
- Baron, Naomi S., Who Wrote This? How AI and the Lure of Efficiency Threaten Human Writing. Stanford, CA: Stanford University Press, 2023
- Baron, Naomi S. ,How We Read Now: Strategic Choices for Print, Screen, and Audio. New York: Oxford University Press, 2021.
- Baron, Naomi S., Words onscreen. The fate of reading in a digital world, Oxford : Oxford University Press, 2015. ISBN 978-0-19-931576-5
- Baron, Naomi S., Always on : language in an online and mobile world, Oxford; New York : Oxford University Press, 2008. ISBN 978-0-19-531305-5
- Baron, Naomi S., Alphabet to E-mail: How Written English Evolved and Where It's Heading, London; New York : Routledge, 2000. ISBN 0-415-18685-4
- Baron, Naomi S., Growing up with language : how children learn to talk, Reading, Mass. : Addison-Wesley Pub. Co., 1992. ISBN 0-201-55080-6
- Baron, Naomi S., Pigeon-birds and rhyming words : the role of parents in language learning, Englewood Cliffs, N.J. : Prentice Hall, 1990. ISBN 0-13-662875-3
- Baron, Naomi S., Computer languages : a guide for the perplexed, Garden City, N.Y.: Anchor Press/Doubleday, 1986. ISBN 0-385-23214-4
- Baron, Naomi S., Speech, writing, and sign : a functional view of linguistic representation, Bloomington : Indiana University Press, 1980. ISBN 0-253-19373-7
- Baron, Naomi S., Language acquisition and historical change, Amsterdam; New York : North Holland Pub. Co.; New York : distributors for the US and Canada, Elsevier North-Holland, 1977. ISBN 0-444-85077-5
