= Center for Teaching Excellence =

- Industry: Higher Education
- Founded: Las Vegas, Nevada, U.S. (June 1, 2006)
- Founder: Edward John Jasonek
- Headquarters: 2880 E. Flamingo Rd., Suite F, Las Vegas, Nevada, U.S.
- Area served: U.S.
- Website: ctenow.com

The Center for Teaching Excellence (CTE) is a broker for higher education. CTE currently works with eight accredited institutions of higher education and offers master's degrees and advanced studies programs for a discounted rate. Since its inception, the CTE has served over 6,000 teachers in the Clark County School District. In December 2010, CTE expanded its services to a national audience.

== History ==
The Center for Teaching Excellence was created in 2006 by Edward John Jasonek. It began as a partnership between the Clark County School District and accredited universities in Las Vegas. At that time its main purpose was to assist teachers in the Clark County School District to increase their teaching ability by attending advanced courses that extended beyond those contained in a master's degree. In 2008, CTE expanded its program offering to include discounted master's degrees. After years of success, in 2010 CTE decided to branch out to a national audience.

== Center for Military Education Advancement ==
During the summer of 2010, CTE created a sub-organization called the Center for Military Education Advancement (CMEA). The CMEA aims to assist members of the U.S. armed forces in utilizing their G.I. Bill benefits by offering them online master's degrees.
