= Mimi Herbert =

American painter and sculptor (born 1936)

- Born: Mimi Herbert; 1936 (age 89–90)
- Citizenship: American
- Writing career
- Language: English
- Genres: Sculpture and Painting
- Subject: Arts
- Notable work: Voices of the Puppet Masters
- Website: www.mimiherbert.com

Mimi Herbert (born 1936) is an American painter and sculptor.

== Education ==
Mimi Herbert earned her Bachelor of Science (1954–58) from the Syracuse University, School of Speech and Dramatic Art, Syracuse, New York, with specialization in "Theater". She received a Master of Arts (1958–61), in South Asia Regional Studies from the University of Pennsylvania, Philadelphia, specializing in "Indian Art History". Thereafter, she enrolled in the graduate sculpture program at the University of California, Berkeley, from 1962 to 1964; studied drawing with the Spanish drawing master, Benjamin Saul, in San Salvador, El Salvador, from 1976 to 1978; and attained Master of Fine Arts from the American University, Washington D.C. in 1983. She also went to Indonesia for research and field work in West Java from 1990 to 1995 for her book "Voices of the Puppet Masters: The Wayang Golek Theater of Indonesia", later published by the Lontar Foundation, Jakarta, and the University of Hawaii Press in North America in 2002. Other than living and working in the U.S., and Indonesia, she has traveled to India, Pakistan, Haiti, Brazil, El Salvador, and New Zealand.

== Career ==
She taught drawing, at the Trinity College in Washington D.C., and at the Northern Virginia Community College, Annandale, Virginia. Her work is in the permanent collections of the Smithsonian American Art Museum, the Smithsonian Renwick Gallery, the Smithsonian National Museum of American History, the Corcoran Gallery of Art, Washington D.C., the Gilbert and Lila Silverman Collection, Bloomfield Hills, Michigan, The American University, Washington D.C., and in the private collections in the United States, Canada, New Zealand, Indonesia and El Salvador. She is the recipient of numerous awards and fellowships.

== Books ==
- Herbert, Mimi (2002). Voices of the puppet masters : the wayang golek theater of Indonesia. Honolulu & Jakarta: University of Hawai'i Press & Lontar Foundation. ISBN 978-979-8083-38-9. OCLC 49693882. . .
