= Michael M. Naydan =

American literary academic

Michael Naydan
- Born: 1952 (age 73–74)
- Known for: Translations of Ukrainian literature; Ukrainian studies

Academic background
- Education: Columbia University (Ph.D., 1984; M.Phil., 1980); American University (M.A., 1975; B.A., 1973)

Academic work
- Institutions: Pennsylvania State University (since 1988); Rutgers University (1986–1988); Yale University (1982–1986)

Michael Marion Naydan (born 1952) is an American literary scholar and translator, the Woskob Family Professor of Ukrainian Studies at Pennsylvania State University. He is known for his translations of Ukrainian and Russian literature and for his academic work in Slavic studies.

== Early life and education ==
Naydan was born in 1952. He is the son of Ukrainian immigrants who were forced laborers during World War II. He earned a B.A. (1973) and M.A. (1975) in Russian Studies from American University. He completed his graduate work at Columbia University, receiving an M.Phil. in 1980 and a Ph.D. in Slavic Languages in 1984.

== Career ==
Naydan began his academic career as a lecturer at Yale University (1982–1986) and Rutgers University (1986–1988). In 1988, he joined the faculty of Pennsylvania State University, where he was appointed the inaugural Woskob Family Professor of Ukrainian Studies in 2007.

From 1993 to 1999, Naydan served as the editor-in-chief of the Slavic and East European Journal. He has been awarded two Fulbright Scholar grants for research in Lviv, Ukraine.

== Selected works ==
=== Translations ===
- Lina Kostenko. Selected Poetry of Lina Kostenko: Wanderings of the Heart. Garland Publishing, 1990. ISBN 978-0-8240-2532-8
- Marina Tsvetaeva. After Russia (Posle Rossii). Co-translated with Slava Yastremski. Ardis Publishers, 1992. ISBN 978-0-87501-077-9
- Yuri Andrukhovych. Perverzion. Northwestern University Press, 2005. ISBN 978-0-8101-1964-2 (Winner of the 2005 AAUS Translation Prize)
- Herstories: An Anthology of New Ukrainian Women Prose Writers. Edited and co-translated by Michael M. Naydan. Glagoslav Publishers, 2014. ISBN 978-1-909156-01-2
  - A review in East/West Journal of Ukrainian Studies noted that the anthology "achieves its ambitious objectives quite successfully."
- Abram Terz (Andrei Sinyavsky). Strolls with Pushkin and Journey to the River Black. Co-translated with Slava Yastremski, Olha Tytarenko, Maria Badanova. Columbia University Press, 2016. ISBN 978-0-231-17822-8
  - A review in the Slavic and East European Journal praised the translation for its "accuracy and creativity."
- Yuri Andrukhovych. My Final Territory: Selected Essays. Co-translated with Mark Andryczyk. University of Toronto Press, 2018. ISBN 978-1-4875-0175-4 (Winner of the 2018 AAUS Translation Prize)
- Maria Matios. Sweet Darusya: A Tale of Two Villages. Co-translated with Olha Tytarenko. Spuyten Duyvil, 2019. ISBN 978-1-949966-45-9
  - A Slavic Review article described it as a "superb translation" that captures the novel's "stylistic richness."
- Serhii Rudenko. Zelensky: A Biography. Co-translated with Alla Perminova. Polity Press, 2022. ISBN 978-1-5095-5306-8

=== Books authored ===
- Seven Signs of the Lion (novel). Glagoslav Publishers, 2016. ISBN 978-1-78437-943-8 (Translated into Ukrainian in 2017).

== Awards and honors ==
- AATSEEL Outstanding Contribution to the Profession Award (2024): A lifetime achievement award from the American Association of Teachers of Slavic and East European Languages, recognizing individuals with a "significant impact on the profession."
- George S. N. Luckyj Ukrainian Literature Translation Prize (2013): Awarded by the Canadian Foundation for Ukrainian Studies.
- AAUS Translation Prize: Awarded multiple times by the American Association for Ukrainian Studies. Wins include 2005 for Yuri Andrukhovych's Perverzion and 2018 for Andrukhovych's My Final Territory.
