= Sara Dunlap Jackson =

American archivist (1919–1991)

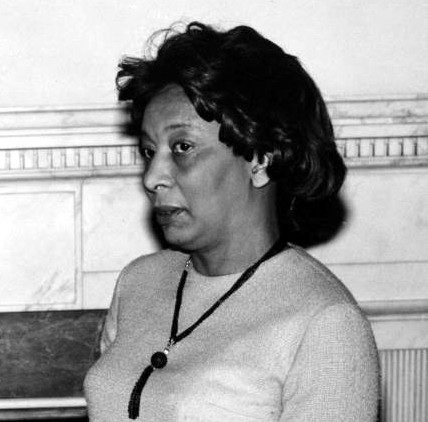
- Sara D. Jackson in 1965
- Born: May 28, 1919; Columbia, South Carolina, U.S.
- Died: April 19, 1991 (aged 71); Washington, D.C., U.S.
- Occupations: archivist, historian
- Years active: 1944–1991
- Employer: National Archives and Records Administration

Sara Dunlap Jackson (May 28, 1919 – April 19, 1991) was an American archivist. She was one of the first African American employees of the National Archives and Records Administration in Washington, D.C., where she specialized in military history.

== Biography ==
=== Early life and education ===
Jackson was born in Columbia, South Carolina. She was adopted and raised by Reverend C. W. Dunlap and his wife, Ella Fair Dunlap, when she was orphaned as a child. She attended Booker T. Washington High School, Allen University and earned a bachelor's degree in sociology at Johnson C. Smith University. Later, she attended graduate school in Washington, D.C., at the American University and the Catholic University of America.

=== Career ===
After working as a high school teacher for a short time, Jackson moved to Washington, D.C., and began working with the War Department. Because of World War II, Jackson had to leave her teaching position in the segregated southern schools. But even in Washington, "colored only" signs were still fairly common and "the racial division of labor that segregation imposed did not promise much for the young black woman from a small black college." Nevertheless, in 1944 she was offered a position in the Military Archives Division of the National Archives and Records Administration, where she became a self-taught expert on records pertaining to the War Department, the U.S. Army and Navy, the Adjutant General's Office, the Engineer Department, the Bureau of Colored Troops, and the Freedmen's Bureau. She was one of the first African American professionals to be hired by the National Archives in Washington, D.C. Here, she specialized in western, military, social and African American topics. She became one of the most knowledgeable historians and archivists of American life.

In the 1950s and 1960s, many Americans were stirred by the civil rights movement and were inspired to study American history. Pushed by racial equality and injustice, these new historians turned to Jackson, where the lines queued through the archives to her desk. The historian Ira Berlin credits Jackson for supporting a transformation in United States historical thought, writing,

a new generation of historians, understanding that transformation of the American present required the transformation of the American past, took up the challenge of rewriting our history. When they arrived at the National Archives, Sara Jackson was ready...She directed them, gently through the power of suggestion and, then, if they did not get the point—well, Sara had her way. Armed with knowledge squeezed from the records, scholars began to write a new history of the United States. It is no exaggeration to say that history rests, to a considerable measure, on the work of Sara Jackson, for Sara Jackson was a great teacher.

He later dedicated a volume in his Freedom series to Jackson with the inscription, "To Sara Dunlap Jackson: Archivist Extraordinaire."

In 1968 she began working with the letters of many prominent Americans at the National Historical Publications and Records Commission, a division of NARA. She retired from the agency in 1990. On April 19, 1991, Jackson died of cancer at her home in Washington, D.C. When she died, she was serving a term on the Western Historical Quarterly Board of Editors.

== Awards and honors ==
- In 1976, the University of Toledo recognized Jackson for her "lifetime of research assistance in scholarly pursuit" by awarding her an Honorary Doctorate of Humane Letters.
- Jackson was awarded the Frank E. Vandiver Award of Merit by the Houston Civil War Round Table for outstanding contributions to Civil War Scholarship.
