= International Review of Administrative Sciences =

International Review of Administrative Sciences (IRAS)
- Discipline: Public administration
- Language: English, French, Mandarin, Spanish
- Edited by: Sabine Kuhlmann

Publication details
- Former name: Progress in Public Administration
- History: 1928-present
- Publisher: SAGE Publications
- Frequency: Quarterly
- Impact factor: 2.3 (2022)

Standard abbreviations
- ISO 4: Int. Rev. Adm. Sci.

Indexing
- ISSN: 0020-8523 (print); 1461-7226 (web)
- LCCN: 61023383
- OCLC no.: 44511174
- Progress in Public Administration
- ISSN: 0552-3060

Links
- Journal homepage; Online access; Online archive

The International Review of Administrative Sciences (IRAS) is a quarterly peer-reviewed academic journal covering the field of public administration. The editor-in-chief is Prof. Manuel Pedro Rodríguez Bolívar (University of Granada). It was established in 1928 and is published by SAGE Publications on behalf of the International Institute of Administrative Sciences. From 1953-1956 it was known as Progress in Public Administration.

== Abstracting and indexing ==
The journal is abstracted and indexed in:

- Current Contents/Social and Behavioral Sciences
- GEOBASE
- ProQuest databases
- Scopus
- Social Sciences Citation Index

According to the Journal Citation Reports, the journal has a 2022 impact factor of 2.3.
