= Mariana Matthews =

Chilean photographer, curator, and visual artist (born 1946)

- Born: 1946 (age 79–80); Santiago, Chile
- Education: American University
- Occupations: Photographer, curator
- Notable work: Adoremos; Ojo de Agua
- Awards: Altazor Award (2000, 2003)

Mariana Matthews (born 1946) is a Chilean photographer, curator, and visual artist whose technique is mainly based on the use of documentary photography, contemporary art, and experimental art.

== Biography ==
Mariana Matthews graduated with a Bachelor of Arts at American University, and earned a postgraduate degree in Photography at Ohio University. She is considered one of the forerunners of so-called patrimonial photography, while the use of mixed techniques predominates in her work, mainly based on black and white photography and the inclusion of color as appropriate within such images.

== Exhibitions and distinctions ==
Matthews has participated in several solo and group exhibitions during her career, including the exhibitions Chiloé: El Bordemar (1991) and Reunión (1994) at the Regional Museum of Ancud, La Selva Fría at the Chiloé Museum of Modern Art, Retrospectiva (2002) and Residencia en el Valle (2005) at the Santiago Museum of Visual Arts, Adoremos (1998), Intervenciones, Cruces y Desvíos (1998), Relatos Breves (2003), Fotografía Contemporánea (2006) and Exposición Centenario (2010) at the Chilean National Museum of Fine Arts, Des-Ahogo (2000) at the Barcelona Museum of Contemporary Art and the Santiago Museum of Contemporary Art, Fragmentos de una Memoria (2001) at the Chilean National History Museum, among other exhibitions in Chile, Latin America, the United States, and Europe.

In 2000 and 2003 she received the Altazor Award for National Arts in the Photography category for Adoremos and Ojo de Agua respectively.

== Publications ==
- Los testigos y sus huellas: fotógrafos del Sur de Chile, Valck, Provoste, Sandoval (Valdivia: Corporación Municipal Cultural Valdivia, 2008)
- Casas del Sur de Chile (Valdivia: El Kultrún, 2002)
- Fragmentos de una memoria 1858–2000: fotografía en la Región de Los Lagos (Valdivia: El Kultrún, 2001)
- Valdivia en madera y metal (Valdivia: El Kultrún, 1993)

=== As editor ===
- Los fabulosos Valck (2005) together with Margarita Alvarado
