= Edward von Kloberg III =

American lobbyist

Edward von Kloberg III (January 9, 1942 – May 1, 2005) was an American lobbyist, infamous for his representation of some of the most notorious dictators of the 20th century.

== Life ==
Born Edward Joseph Kloberg III (he added a "van" to his name in the 1960s and changed it to "von" on the advice of Arnaud de Borchgrave, who told him it was more "distinguished") in New York City, he was the son of an engineer who built housing projects. He graduated from Rider College in 1965, and went on to receive a Master's Degree in history at American University. He was then hired by American University as a fundraiser, and was eventually appointed Dean of Admissions and Financial Aid.

In 1982, von Kloberg began a public relations and lobbying firm, named van Kloberg & Associates, which was renamed the Washington World Group in 1992. In 1984, he was convicted of filing false financial statements with a Washington bank in connection with loan application. He was sentenced to one year probation. Von Kloberg, who often referred to his clients as "the damned," eventually went on to represent Saddam Hussein, Samuel K. Doe of Liberia, Nicolae Ceauşescu of Romania, Mobutu Sésé Seko of the then-Zaire and the Burmese embassy in the United States. Upon the overthrow of Mobutu, von Kloberg then represented the government of Laurent Kabila, whose forces had pushed Mobutu from power.

In 1996, von Kloberg represented the apparel manufacturers of Honduras, who were being accused of sexual abuse and child labor. He later admitted that his clients had been guilty of the accusations, but insisted that his representation of them had led to reforms.

Von Kloberg was known for his flamboyant personal style. He affected the title "Baron", and was frequently seen wearing a black opera cape, either lined with red silk or with silk in a dove pattern, and a sash decorated with medals given to him by clients. He traveled with steamer trunks, and was driven in a black limousine also decorated with medals and badges.

The authors of the book Washington Babylon wrote of von Kloberg, "Even within the amoral world of Washington lobbying, [he] stands out for handling clients that no one else will touch." Von Kloberg and Associates worked for the authoritarian regime in Togo. Washingtonian magazine once labeled him one of the city's "hired guns". Von Kloberg himself reveled in the motto, "Shame is for sissies."

Spy magazine once ran a sting operation against von Kloberg, in which a staff employee posed as a neo-Nazi who advocated the annexation of Poland by Germany. When von Kloberg offered to represent her, the magazine reported on the sting operation under the headline, "Washington's Most Shameless Lobbyist". Following publication of the story, von Kloberg showed up at the magazine's Washington office wearing a helmet, announcing that he was ready to "take the flak".

In 2001, exiled King Kigeli V of Rwanda invested von Kloberg as a Chevalier Grand Croix of the Royal Order of the Intare. The King called von Kloberg "a great friend of Africa and a true aristocrat."

== Death ==
Von Kloberg committed suicide in 2005 by jumping from the walls of the Castel Sant'Angelo in Rome. By this time he was sick and broke. In his pockets were a note for his younger lover, Darius Monkevicius, who had left him, and a magazine cover showing him beside president George H. W. Bush.
