= Atiaf Alwazir =

Yemeni researcher, human rights activist, citizen journalist and blogger

Atiaf Al-Wazir
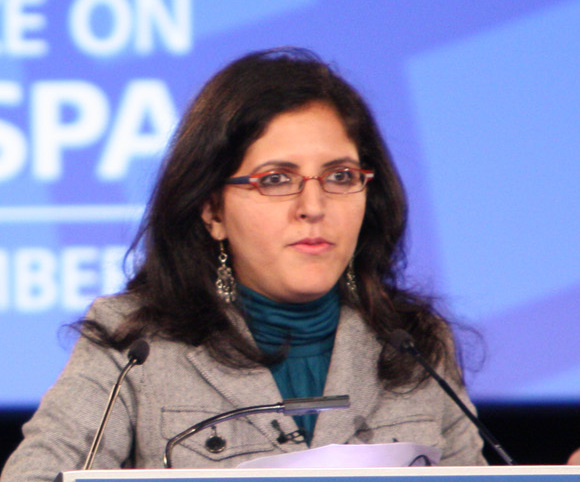
- Born: Atiaf Zaid Al-Wazir
- Education: American University
- Occupations: Researcher, Citizen Journalist, Blogger, Social Activist
- Website: http://womanfromyemen.blogspot.com

Atiaf Zaid Al-Wazir is a Yemeni researcher, human rights activist, citizen journalist and blogger and co-founder of the media advocacy group Support Yemen. Al-Wazir has lived in Tunis, Tunisia and Brussels, Belgium, and currently lives in the United States.

== Personal life and education ==
Al-Wazir was born in Sana’a and grew up in the US and Egypt. Her father is Zaid Ali Alwazir, a Yemeni scholar, who produced a large number of publications on political Islam, including the controversial book Al-Fardia, or "Autocracy": a research on authoritarianism in Islamic history. She received her Master in International Relations from American University, in Washington, D.C. Her dissertation focused on women in prison in Yemen, between honor and crime.

== Career ==
Since 2011, Al-Wazir has chronicled the revolution in Yemen on her blog, 'Woman from Yemen' on which is broadcast documentaries supported by observations and eyewitness accounts, related videos and images. She has nine years experience of campaigning for social justice programs in the Middle East and North Africa via supporting various civic societies programs. She has spoken extensively on "human rights, humanitarian relief and political awareness."

She was a non-resident research fellow at The Stiftung Wissenschaft und Politik (SWP). She wrote on the "Independent Youth Movement in Yemen's Transition" in the project “Transformation, Elite Change and New Social Mobilization in the Arab World” and talked about the role of Yemen's independent youth movement in the National Dialogue Conference.

Al-Wazir worked at National Endowment for Democracy, Washington D.C. as a Program Officer from June 2004 to June 2008. Her work also is published in 'Foreign Policy, the Arab Reform Initiative, Project on Middle East Democracy (POMED), Jaddaliya, Al-Akhbar'.

Al-Wazir currently works as an educator and student advisor at American University.

== Writings ==
- "Is Yemen's revolution defeated?." Al-Jazeera English, 22 February 2014.
- "The birth and death of cinema in Aden." Al-Jazeera English, 2 January 2014.
- "Government Shutdown? Ask the Yemenis." Free Arabs, 25 October 2013.
- "How Yemeni Coffee Reaches American Cups." Al Monitor, 3 October 2013.
- "Justice for Hassan will show if Yemen has really changed." The National, 2 September 2013.
- "Yemen's Independent Youth and Their Role in the National Dialogue Conference." SWP Comments, 11 August 2013.
- "The flawed media narrative on Yemen." Your Middle east Start up, 28 April 2013.
- "Youth Inclusion in Yemen: a Necessary Element for Success of political transition." Arab Reform Initiative, December 2012.
- "The Square of Change in Sana’a_ an Incubator for Reform." Arab Reform, May 2011.
- "Garbage Collectors and the Struggle for Workers' Rights in Yemen." Jadaliyya, 1 June 2012.
