= Victor Kamber =

American political consultant

- Born: Victor Samuel Kamber; May 7, 1943; Chicago, Illinois, U.S.
- Died: February 26, 2024 (aged 80); McLean, Virginia, U.S.
- Education: University of Illinois at Urbana-Champaign (BA); University of New Mexico (MA); American University (JD); George Washington University (LLM)
- Occupations: political consultant, lawyer, activist
- Political party: Democratic

Victor Samuel Kamber (May 7, 1943 – February 26, 2024) was an American labor union activist and political consultant in the United States. A Democrat, he worked for the AFL-CIO in the 1970s before forming The Kamber Group, a public relations firm, in 1980.

The Kamber Group worked for Democratic Party candidates and labor unions for 25 years, becoming one of the most well-known "boutique" P.R. firms in Washington, D.C. Kamber sold The Kamber Group in 2005 to Carmen Group Lobbying, where he remained president of its subsidiary, Carmen Group Communications.

Kamber was a frequent guest on national and local television and radio programs, newspapers and magazines, and is a published author.

He was an adjunct professor at The American University.

== Early life and career ==
Kamber, an Assyrian-American, was born in 1943 in Chicago, Illinois, and attended public schools there.

Kamber subsequently attended the University of Illinois at Urbana-Champaign. During his undergraduate schooling, Kamber joined the Phi Gamma Delta collegiate social fraternity. In 1965, he along with Samuel E. Honneger and Joseph Mullins worked tirelessly to establish the Delta Colony of Phi Gamma Delta at the University of New Mexico which later became the Alpha Nu chapter of Phi Gamma Delta in 1966. He worked on the presidential campaign of United States Senator Barry Goldwater. He earned his bachelor's degree in 1965.

In 1968, Kamber worked on the presidential campaigns of Nelson Rockefeller and Richard Nixon.

Kamber later received a Master of Arts degree from the University of New Mexico, a J.D. from the Washington College of Law at the American University, and a master of laws from George Washington University (he received this last degree in 1972).

Kamber later was an administrative assistant to United States Representative Seymour Halpern (R-New York).

In 1970, Kamber was convicted of forgery while teaching at Prince George's Community College (PGCC). At the time, Kamber was president of the national Young Republicans' leadership training school in Chicago. Federal officials accused him of submitting a forged letter to his draft board in 1968. The letter had ostensibly been signed by the president of PGCC and attested that Kamber was a faculty member there. But PGCC president John Handley testified he had not seen the letter, had not authorized it and had not signed it. Kamber was acquitted of charges that he did not teach at the community college, but convicted of forgery and sentenced to two years in prison.

== AFL-CIO career ==
After his conviction, Kamber worked as a lobbyist for the Building and Construction Trades Department (BCTD) of the AFL-CIO. Under Robert Georgine, also a Republican, Kamber rose quickly to become the department's chief lobbyist. Kamber's tenure at BCTD was marked by a significant drop in the political power of the AFL-CIO on Capitol Hill. In 1977, Kamber and the BCTD persuaded the Democratic leadership in the House of Representatives to rush a common situs picketing bill onto the floor in the hopes of stampeding members of Congress to approve the legislation. Instead, the tactic lead to a major defeat for labor.

After the defeat of the picketing bill, Kamber was tapped by AFL-CIO president George Meany to head a labor law reform task force. Kamber's goal was to prioritize the AFL-CIO's labor law reform goals, strategize a plan for building support for the bill, and winning the legislation's enactment. The effort never got off the ground, as political changes in Congress put the labor federation on the political defensive.

== The Kamber Group years ==
Kamber left the AFL-CIO in 1980 and founded his own public relations firm, The Kamber Group.

During his first year, his announced goal was to become the "Hill & Knowlton of the left", but his current anniversary press kit observes that the firm is "often referred to as the 'Bob Gray and Company of the left'", a reference to the fast-growing Georgetown concern with strong White House ties.

The Kamber Group quickly known as one of Washington's hottest public relations firms. In time, it became one of the nation's largest independently owned consulting and public relations firms.

Almost immediately, Kamber took on some very high-profile clients. He established a legal defense fund for Rep. Frank Thompson Jr. (D-New Jersey), who was caught in the federal government's Abscam sting. He also supported a movement to draft Sen. Ted Kennedy for the Democratic presidential nomination.

In 1982, Kamber founded the Progressive Political Action Committee (ProPAC). ProPAC was a political action committee which sought to counteract political election spending by the National Conservative Political Action Committee (NCPAC) by supporting Democratic candidate for federal office. Kamber served as ProPAC's treasurer. ProPAC shut down its operations in 1983.

Kamber did not neglect his labor roots, however. He was counsel for the NFL Players Association during the 1982 National Football League strike. He also served as a public relations consultant and spokesman for the Laborers' International Union of North America (LIUNA). In April 1983, the Senate Permanent Subcommittee on Investigations heard testimony that reputed Chicago mobster Tony Accardo "hand-picked" Edward T. Hanley of the Hotel Employees and Restaurant Employees and Angelo Fosco of LIUNA to be presidents of their respective unions. Kamber helped LIUNA strategize a political and public relations response to the allegations. Kamber pushed his consulting firm to get into labor organizing campaigns as well. In 1984, he sued Ray Rogers, president of Corporate Campaigns, Inc., over Rogers' attempt to patent the term "corporate campaign." He also advised Doris Turner in her unsuccessful re-election bid for president of the Drug, Hospital, and Health Care Employees Union (better known as Local 1199) in 1986.

In 1984, Kamber was a national campaign advisor to Sen. Alan Cranston during his run for the U.S. presidency. However, Kamber eventually resigned as political and public relations consultant to the campaign after complaining that Cranston's personal staff pushed him to the side. The relationship between Kamber and the Cranston campaign deteriorated further when Kamber sought a temporary restraining order freezing the campaign's funds. Kamber claimed the Cranston campaign owned him $150,000, but the funds were unfrozen a short time later.

In 1987, Kamber established Americans Against Government Control of Unions. The outfit was a non-profit company whose goal was to build public opinion against government takeovers of corrupt labor unions. William Olwell, vice president of the United Food and Commercial Workers (UFCW), was the group's treasurer. Kamber formed the group as UFCW, the Teamsters and other unions were under investigation for labor racketeering and domination by organized crime. Although The Kamber Group was working for the Teamsters at the time, Kamber asserted that the formation of his new organization was unrelated to the government's investigation of the Teamsters.

In 1988, Kamber played a key role in helping re-affiliate the Teamsters with the AFL-CIO. The union had been ejected from the labor federation in the 1950s over charges of corruption, but the AFL-CIO had been asking the Teamsters to rejoin the federation throughout the 1980s. William H. Wynn, president of UFCW, and BCTD president Georgine, assisted by Kamber, negotiated the Teamsters' return.

Kamber turned his attention back to politics in 1992. He supported the U.S presidential candidacy of Sen. Tom Harkin. Although he did not become involved in a presidential campaign to the extent that he did in 1984, Kamber nevertheless played a big role in the 1992 election. In July of that year, he established a political action committee called Americans for Change. The group's goal was to raise $1 million to run attack ads against President George H. W. Bush.

In 1993, Kamber led the battle to end a Republican filibuster of the nomination of William B. Gould IV to be chair of the National Labor Relations Board. The Republicans eventually gave up the filibuster, and Gould was confirmed.

In 2002, Kamber became a paid spokesman for the International Union of Painters and Allied Trades, acting as a political consultant and public relations expert for the union.

In 2003, Kamber established the Kamber Group Political Action Fund, a political action committee. Kamber became the PAC's treasurer.

=== USW/AFT scandal ===
In 1984, the United Steelworkers hired Kamber to direct several key organizing and collective bargaining campaigns.

Kamber subsequently was forced to take responsibility for a scandal which involved the American Federation of Teachers (AFT), another AFL-CIO affiliate. In February 1985, Albert Shanker, then president of the AFT, announced at a news conference his union had convinced the New York State Teachers Retirement System to withdraw $450 million from Manufacturers Hanover Trust Company because the bank had poorly administered workers' pension funds. Shanker also announced that the union had convinced the Pennsylvania School Employees' Retirement System to withdraw $300 million from the same bank, and that five other state teachers' retirement funds were expected to do the same. AFL-CIO officials said the AFT had convinced the retirement systems to withdraw the funds to protest loans Manufacturers Hanover had made to the Phelps Dodge mining corporation, which was involved in a bitter strike with the steelworkers.

Shanker was later forced to retract his statement. The pension fund deal had never existed, he said a few days later. The state retirement funds had withdrawn only $200 million from the bank. Shanker also admitted the fund withdrawals had been going on since mid-1984, and had nothing to do with the strike at Phelps Dodge.

Shanker angrily said that he had been "taken advantage of" and blamed Kamber. Kamber accepted responsibility, saying, "We're paid to take the blame, so we're at fault."

== Closure of The Kamber Group ==
On November 11, 1994, The Kamber Group's offices on were badly damaged by fire caused by an electrical short. Kamber is a noted collector of political memorabilia and art. Along with the loss of records, an estimated $300,000 in art—most of it from Kamber's personal collection, on loan to The Kamber Group—was also lost.

In 2003, Kamber resigned as president of The Kamber Group. Thomas J. Mackell Jr. was named president and chief operating officer of The Kamber Group in his stead. Kamber remained the company's chairman and chief executive officer.

On February 28, 2005, Kamber closed The Kamber Group and joined The Carmen Group as president of Carmen Group Communications. The Carmen Group was founded by David M. Carmen, a friend of Kamber's. A number of Kamber employees took jobs with The Carmen Group as well.

== Other positions and honors ==
Kamber was also secretary-treasurer of America's Agenda: Health Care for All, a union-led group which lobbies for universal health care. He was a member of the Economic Club of Washington, and treasurer for the National Theatre.

In 2006, Kamber received the PR News Hall of Fame Award.

== Electoral campaign innovations ==
Kamber is noted as an innovative political campaigner.

In 1979 Kamber purchased the Politicards name, a company that had put out a set of playing cards featuring the image of political candidates and public officials in 1972. He went on to produce his own sets of playing cards under the Politicards name for election years 1980 and 1984. In 1996, the Politicards name was reclaimed by Peter Green, the artist responsible for the original deck in 1972. The cards, known as "Politicards", were widely imitated over the years, especially by the most-wanted Iraqi playing cards.

In 1984, Kamber created "Rappin' Ronnie", a music video which depicted a rapping President Ronald Reagan. The video was broadcast on "Convention Television", a closed-circuit television "magazine program" broadcast to delegates at the Democratic National Convention. The video depicted a stuttering Reagan saying his trademark "W-w-w-w-well well well". The music video eventually aired on MTV, and was featured in "Homer Loves Flanders", a fifth-season episode of The Simpsons.

In 1992, Kamber started a PAC, Americans for Change, hoping to be the Democratic party's answer to Floyd Brown, the Republican party's opposition research specialist known for unethical, negative campaign tactics.

=== Role in the Reagan assassination attempt ===
Robert F. Bonitati, an aide to President Reagan, credits Kamber with saving his life during the Reagan assassination attempt. Bonitati, a friend of Kamber's, was leaving the Washington Hilton Hotel with the president. Kamber pulled Bonitati aside for a few seconds. Just then, Reagan exited the hotel and John Hinckley Jr. shot and wounded him and three others. "Bonitati has often said his brief conversation with Kamber may have saved his life." Bonitati later joined The Kamber Group as a vice president, and set up a "nonpartisan" flower shop with Kamber.

== Death ==
Kamber died on February 26, 2024, aged 80, after battling with illness.

== Published books ==
- Kamber, Victor. Giving Up on Democracy: Why Term Limits Are Bad for America Washington, D.C.: Regnery Publishing, 2005. ISBN 0-89526-465-X
- Kamber, Victor. Poison Politics: Are Negative Campaigns Destroying Democracy? New York City: Basic Books, 2003. ISBN 978-0-7382-0872-5
- O'Leary, Bradley S. and Kamber, Victor. Are You a Conservative or a Liberal? Austin, Tex.: Boru Books, 1996. ISBN 1-887161-22-8
