= Montserrat Sagot =

Costa Rican sociologist

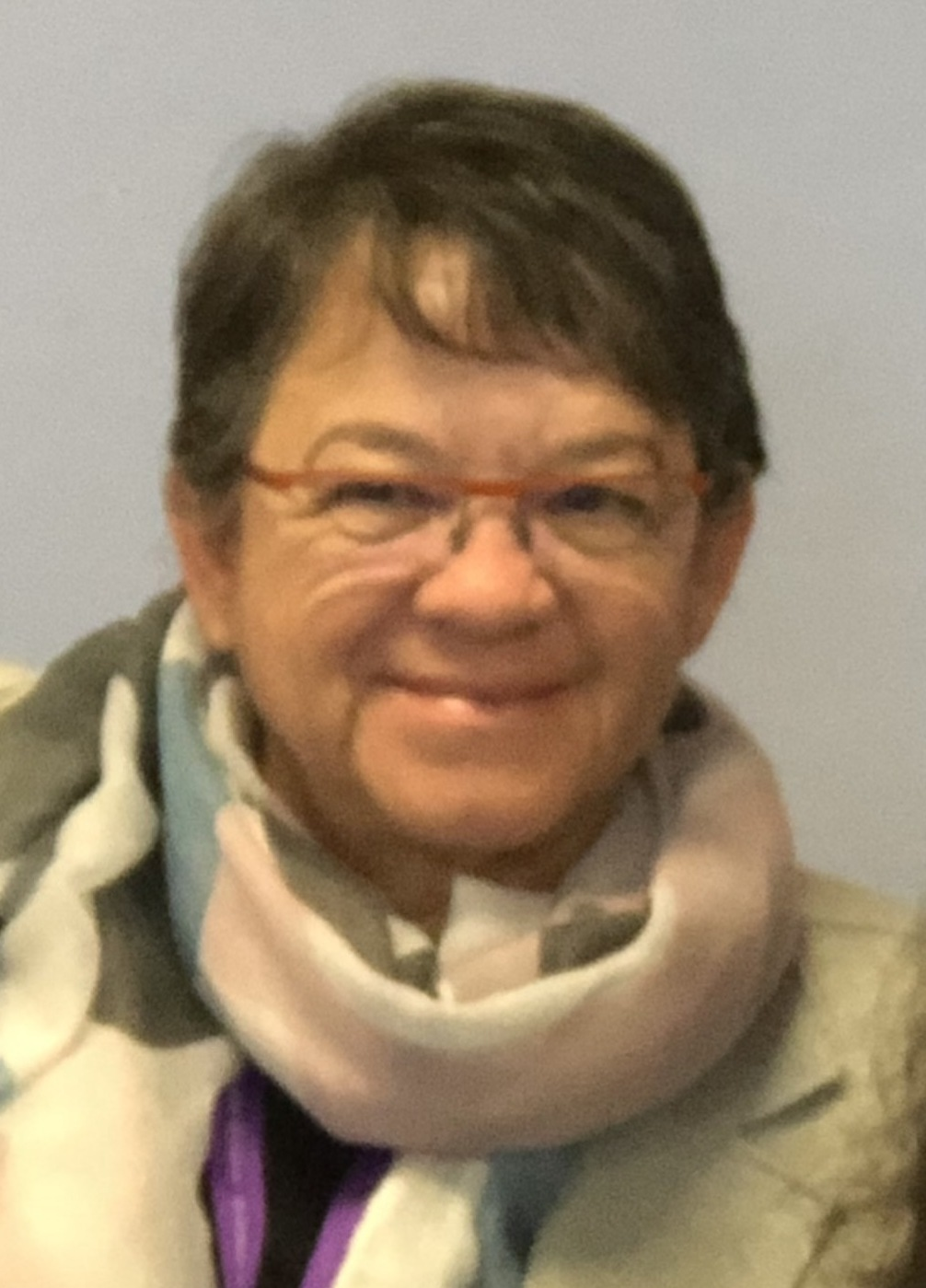
- Education: University of Costa Rica; American University
- Occupation: Sociologist

Montserrat Sagot Rodríguez is a Costa Rican sociologist especially known for her work on violence against women and girls. She was a pioneer in research on femicide in Central America. In 2010, she published the first research on femicide in Costa Rica.

== Academia ==
She has a degree in anthropology (1981) and a master's degree in sociology from the University of Costa Rica. She received a doctorate in sociology, specializing in political sociology and gender sociology at the American University in Washington DC (1992).

She worked at the University College of Alajuela (1982–1985) and at the American University (1988–1989). Since 1990, she is a professor at the University of Costa Rica, she is a professor at the schools of Anthropology and Sociology and also works in various graduate programs, among which Interdisciplinary Studies in disability, Educational Evaluation, Gerontology, and Sociology stand out.

She has also been director of the Women, Gender, and Sexualities Masters Studies at the UCR.

At present, she is director of the Center for Research in Women's Studies (CIEM) of Costa Rica for the period 2016-2020 and a professor at the School of Sociology of the University of Costa Rica. She also serves as co-coordinator of the CLACSO Working Group "Feminism, Resistance and Emancipatory Processes."

== Femicide ==
“As the daughter and granddaughter of women who directly suffered several manifestations of violence, this was a problem that always interested me, precisely because I had to experience it closely and I could see its devastating consequences in my family environment and in women whom I loved a lot” she explains.

Upon entering university, Sagot became involved with the Feminist Center for Information and Action (CEFEMINA), an organization that, in her own words, “in the early 1980s, when nobody in Costa Rica spoke of violence against women, began the first discussions and actions aimed at confronting this serious social problem.” CEFEMINA and the "Woman You Are Not Alone" program were part of the organizations founded in 1989 by the Latin American and Caribbean Feminist Network against domestic and sexual violence. In 2004, the Central American Feminist Network Against Violence Against Women was created in Guatemala.

CEFEMINA, together with other organizations and independent professionals, organized the first self-help groups for battered women. In this context, Sagot was responsible for facilitating some of the first groups of this nature that were created in the country and throughout the Central American region. This experience is directly related to her work for the eradication of femicide: “it was in these direct relationships with women who suffered violence that we began to realize the very serious risks they face, and a little later we even had to mourn the death of some of our companions of the self-help groups at the hands of their aggressors. In the early 1990s, Ana Carcedo and I had the opportunity to learn about the book "Femicide: The Politics of Woman Killing," which had just been published by Jill Radford and Diana Russell. We came up with the idea of conducting an investigation into the murders of women in Costa Rica using a slightly narrower version of the concept of "Femicide" raised in the book by Radford and Russell.”

In 2003, Sagot was coordinator of the First National Survey of Violence against Women and later she was part of the coordinating team to design the second national survey in Costa Rica.

== Awards and honors ==
- “Irene B. Taeuber” Award from the Sociological Association of the District of Columbia, Washington, DC, 1991.
- Fulbright Research Fellowship at the University of Michigan in Ann Arbor, 1996.
- "Golden Lamp" Award for the Defense of Women's Rights, Costa Rica, 2000.
- Institutional Medal UCR 2017.

== Publications ==
She is the author of a wide variety of publications and research on violence against women, the rights of girls and adolescents, democracy, and female participation, among others. She has also coordinated important national investigations such as the "II State of the Rights of Children and Adolescents" (2001) and "A Gender Look at Domestic Child Labor" (2003).

=== Books ===
- Critical Path of Women Affected by Violence Intrafamily Society in Latin America (2000) Montserrat Sagot with the collaboration of Ana Carcedo. Pan American Health Organization
- Femicide in Costa Rica, with Ana Carcedo, INAMU, 2001
- Situation of human rights of historically discriminated populations in Costa Rica: an analysis from the framework of justice (2013)Inter-American Institute of Human Rights, 2013.
