= Edward M. Glick =

Edward M. Glick (May 23, 1920 - July 22, 2008) was born in Cleveland, Ohio, and served in the U.S. Army from 1942 to 1945. From 1943 to 1947 he attended Ohio State University and Western Reserve University, where he earned a B.A. in journalism and a M.A., respectively.

In 1949, Glick was the key speaker at the annual meeting of the President's Committee on Employment of the Handicapped. He also served that same year as executive director of the Ohio Governor's Committee on Employment of the Handicapped.

In the early 1950s, Glick served as a public affairs officer for the Department of State and as a speechwriter for the Department of Health, Education, and Welfare. He ended his government career in 1960 as a special consultant for the U.S. Public Health Service.

Glick served as associate professor of communication at American University from 1961 to 1967 while simultaneously serving as visiting professor of political science for George Washington University and the University of Maryland, College Park. From 1965 to 1976, he was managing director for the American Institute for Political Communication.
