= Stephen Silvia =

American academic (born 1959)

Stephen J. Silvia
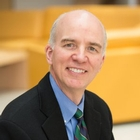
- Born: February 2, 1959 (age 67); Buffalo, New York, United States
- Education: Cornell University (B.S. ILR); Yale University (Ph.D.)
- Known for: Labor and employment relations in Germany and the United States of America; German economy
- Spouse: Jennifer Paxton
- Awards: DAAD Award for Distinguished Scholarship in German and European Studies, 2014
- Scientific career
- Fields: Comparative Industrial Relations, Comparative Politics, German Economy
- Workplaces: American University

Stephen J. Silvia is a professor at American University's School of International Service and an affiliate professor in American University's Economics Department. He teaches international economics, international trade relations, and comparative politics. He is a noted expert on the German economy, in particular, on German labor markets and industrial relations. He has written about comparative industrial relations, European Union economic policy, and comparative economic policy, with an emphasis on Germany and the United States.

== Education and career ==
Stephen J. Silvia was born in Buffalo, NY. He received his Bachelor of Science in industrial and labor relations from Cornell University in 1981. In 1990, he obtained his PhD in political science from Yale University, where he also served as acting professor.

Before coming to American University in 1990, Stephen Silvia served as visiting assistant professor of political science at Tufts University. In 1993, Silvia was a Fulbright Guest Scholar at Freie Universität Berlin, and in 1994 and 1995 he was the James Bryant Conant Fellow in German and European Studies at the Minda de Gunzberg Center for European Studies at Harvard University. He was a guest professor at Universität Kassel in Germany in January 2009, and l'université Montpellier I in France in October 2010. He is a non-resident fellow at the American Institute for Contemporary German Studies (AICGS).

Stephen Silvia served as a board member of the American Consortium on European Union Studies (ACES), EU Center of Excellence, from 2001 to 2015. In 2015, Stephen Silvia served as president of the District of Columbia Chapter of the Labor Research and Employment Association.

Stephen Silvia served as a Trustee on the American University board of trustees from 2008 to 2010. He was chair of the American University Faculty Senate during the 2008–2009 academic year. He has chaired American University's Committee on Faculty Actions, which is a university-wide rank-and-tenure committee, since 2014. He served as Director of Doctoral Studies at American University's School of International Service from 1999 to 2012, and founding director of the Masters of International Relations program, which is an online degree, from 2012 to 2014.

Stephen Silvia has received numerous grants including two Fulbright fellowships, a Robert Bosch Fellowship, a DaimlerChrysler Fellowship and a Volkswagen Foundation Grant.

Silvia was married in 1989 to Jennifer Paxton, a history professor, The Teaching Company lecturer, and daughter of folk-singer Tom Paxton.

== Notable awards ==
SCHOLARSHIP AWARDS

- DAAD Award for Distinguished Scholarship in German and European Studies, 2014

TEACHING AWARDS

- Gunther Eyck Award for Teaching and Mentoring Students, 2009–10
- German Academic Exchange Service (DAAD) Best Syllabus in German Studies, First Place, 1997
- American University Graduate Student Association, Outstanding Graduate Teaching, 1996–97
- Outstanding Teacher, School of International Service, American University, 1995–96
- Outstanding Dedication and Service to Students, American University Student Confederation,1995–96
- Mortar Board Senior Honor Society, Outstanding Educator Nominee, 1995

SERVICE AWARDS

- University Faculty Award for Outstanding Service to the American University Community, 2008–09
- School of International Service, Darrell Randall Award for Outstanding Service to the University Community, 2008–09
- School of International Service, Darrell Randall Award for Outstanding Service to the University Community, 2006–07

== Notable publications ==
BOOKS

- The UAW’s Southern Gamble: Organizing Workers at Foreign-Owned Vehicle Plants. Ithaca, N.Y.: Cornell University Press, 2023.
- Holding the Shop Together: German Industrial Relations in the Postwar Era. Ithaca, New York: Cornell University Press, 2013.

ARTICLES AND CHAPTERS

- “A Silver Age? The German Economy since Reunification.” German Politics and Society 37, no. 4 (Winter 2020): 74–94. https://doi:10.3167/gps.2019.370407
- “The Transnational Activities of German Trade Unions and Works Councils: From Foreign Policy to Active Engagement.” German Politics 29, no. 3 (2020): 404–21, https://doi.org/10.1080/09644008.2018.1551486
- “Participatory Governance in Employment Relations.” In Hubert Heinelt, ed., Handbook on Participatory Governance. Cheltenham: Edward Elgar, 2018, chap. 10, pp. 185–202 [lead author, with Wolfgang Schroeder]. https://doi.org/10.4337/9781785364358.00015
- "The United Auto Workers Attempts to unionize Volkswagen, Chattanooga. Industrial and Labor Relations Review. 71, no. 3 (May 2018), doi: 10.1177/0019793917723620, (Winner of the 2017 Best Paper Competition LERA/ILR Review Special Series in Employment Relations).
- "Mitglieder Entwicklung und Organisationsstärke der Unternehmerverbände." in W. Schroeder and B. Wessels, eds., Handbuch Arbeitgeber- und Wirtschaftsverbände in Deutschland. Wiesbaden: Springer, 2017 (https://doi.org/10.1007/978-3-658-08176-8_10).
- "Why do German and US Reactions to the Financial Crisis differ?" German Politics and Society 29, no. 4 (Winter 2011), pp. 68–71.
- "Things Fall Apart: Contemporary Analyses of German Economic and Political Developments," Comparative European Politics, (October 2010).
- "The Elusive Quest for Normalcy: The German Economy since Unification," German Politics and Society 28, no. 2 (Summer 2010), pp. 82–101.
- "Why Germany reformed Public Pensions, but the United States did not," German Studies Review 32, no. 1 (February 2009): 23–50.
- "German Trade Unionism in the Postwar Years: The Third and Fourth Movements," in Craig L. Phelan, ed., Trade Unions since 1945: Towards a Global History. Oxford: Peter Lang, 2009.
- "Why are German Employers Associations Declining? Arguments and Evidence," Comparative Political Studies 40, no. 12 (Dec. 2007): 1433-59 [lead author, with Wolfgang Schroeder].
- "Is the Euro Working? The Euro and European Labor Markets," Journal of Public Policy 24, no. 2 (August 2004): 147–168.
- "Gewerkschaften und Arbeitgeberverbände," in Wolfgang Schroeder and Berhard Wessels, eds., Gewerkschaften in Politik und Gesellschaft der Bundesrepublik. Opladen: Westdeutscher Verlag, 2003, [with Wolfgang Schroeder].
- Reinventing the German Economy. AICGS, The Johns Hopkins University, 2003.
- "Every Which Way but Loose: German Industrial Relations since 1980," in Andrew Martin et al., eds., The Brave New World of European Labor: European Trade Unions at the Millennium. New York: Berghahn, 1999, chap. 3, pp. 75–174.
- "Reform Gridlock and the Role of the Bundesrat in German Politics," West European Politics 22, no. 2 (April 1999): 167–181.
- "German Unification and Emerging Divisions within German Employers’ Associations: Cause or Catalyst?" Comparative Politics 29, no. 2 (January 1997), pp. 187-208.
- "The Social Charter of the European Community: A Defeat for European Labor." Industrial and Labor Relations Review 44, no. 4 (July 1991): 626–43.
