= International Institute of Administrative Sciences =

Non-profit organisation based in Belgium

- Abbreviation: IIAS
- Formation: 1930
- Legal status: International non-profit Organisation
- Headquarters: Brussels, Belgium
- Region served: Worldwide
- Leadership: President: Voruganti Srinivas, IAS officer, India; Director General: Dr. Sofiane Sahraoui, Tunisia
- Website: iias-iisa.org

Created in 1930, the International Institute of Administrative Sciences (IIAS) is an International Association with Scientific Purpose whose seat is in Brussels. As a non-governmental international organisation its activities are centred on the study of public administration and it provides a forum in which comparative studies – including both practical experiences and theoretical analyses of experts in public administration worldwide and from all cultures – are presented and discussed. The Institute is interested in all questions related to contemporary public administration at the national and international level.

Each year IIAS holds three conferences in three countries around the world, is host for seven-hundred plus delegates, publishes approximately 10 books, publishes four issues of its International Review of Administrative Sciences (in three editions English, French and Mandarin Chinese), leads and coordinates activities among its ninety Member States and National Sections.

== The Institute has four specialised sub-entities ==
A specialised organisation:

- The International Association of Schools and Institutes of Administration (IASIA)

Three regional organisations:

- The European Group for Public Administration (EGPA)
- The Latin American Group for Public Administration (LAGPA)
- The Asian Group for Public Administration (AGPA)

each of which conducts study, research and networking.

== Membership ==
The IIAS count members from every regions of the world as well as several international organisations.

The membership is divided into different categories:

- Member State
- Governmental international organisation established by a Treaty and comprised at least in part of Member States of IIAS

any non-governmental international organisation

- « National Sections » = groups of professionally qualified individuals, in member, or non-member, countries of IIAS, interested in the objectives of IIAS and desirous of working closely with it
- « Corporate Members » = institutions or associations duly set up having activities in the field of public administration on the national, international, or regional levels

== Organisation of IIAS ==
The management bodies of the International Institute of Administrative Sciences are:

- The Council of Administration
- The General Assembly
- The Programme and Research Advisory Committee
- The Finance Committee
- and the General Directorate in Brussels

The Council of Administration ensures the management and direct control of the affairs of the Institute, decides on the proposal of the Programme and Research Advisory Committee the Institute's programme of activities, and establishes the Institute's annual budget in accordance with the directions of the Council of Administration. Its President, who also holds the title of President of the International Institute of Administrative Sciences, is Voruganti Srinivas and will serve a term until 2028.

The General Assembly lays down the general policy governing the work of the Institute and defines the methods of operation of the various services of the Institute. It approves the budget and adopts the statement of accounts on the basis of the report of the auditor that it appoints. The members of the Council of Administration are representatives from Member States, National Sections and International Organisations (please see the list of IIAS Members) convene under the chairmanship of the IIAS President.

General Directorate is the day-to-day management body in Brussels and is led by Mr. Sofiane Sahraoui, Director General.
