= Adrienne Arieff =

American businessman and writer

Adrienne Arieff is an entrepreneur and author of several books, including the controversial book The Sacred Thread. She wrote The Sacred Thread after traveling to India and hiring a woman there to serve as a surrogate mother for her twin daughters that were conceived via in vitro fertilisation. Arieff's positive treatment of surrogacy prompted debate over the ethical and legal status of paying poor women to serve as surrogate mothers.

Arieff also co-wrote with Beverly West Fairy-Tale Success: A Guide to Entrepreneurial Magic which was released in October 2014. The book is written as a manual for young women who want to run their own business. Arieff founded her business, Arieff Communications, a San Francisco-based public relations and marketing firm, in 2002.

She is the sister of design writer Allison Arieff.
