= Nitin Pradhan =

American government official

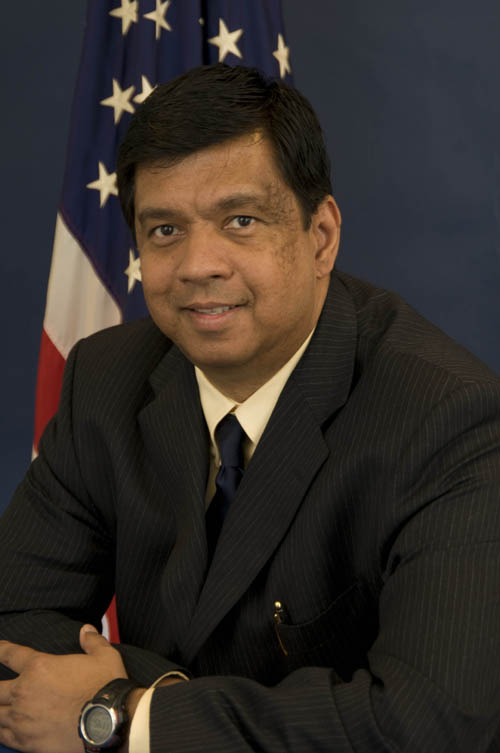

Departmental Chief Information Officer (CIO)
- In office July 6, 2009 – August 31, 2012
- Preceded by: Dan Mintz

Prior position: IT executive, Fairfax County Public Schools (FCPS)
- Website: US DOT CIO

Nitin Pradhan served as the departmental chief information officer (CIO) for the US Department of Transportation (DOT) as part of the Obama administration from July 6, 2009, to August 31, 2012. After leaving US DOT, Pradhan established and led the nation's first Federal Technology Accelerator and Partner Consortium called Public Private Innovations and later cofounded GOVonomy, an emerging products technology marketplace for the public sector as well as ScaleUP USA, a Digital Business Growth Accelerator.

Prior to joining DOT, Pradhan was an IT executive at Fairfax County Public Schools (FCPS), the 12th largest school district in the United States. Earlier, Pradhan was the managing director of Virginia's Center for Innovative Technology (CIT). He was also the co-founder and former CEO of a wireless startup.

== Early life and education ==
Born and brought up in Pune, India, Pradhan attended Loyola High School (Pune). After high school, Pradhan attended the Faculty of Technology and Engineering, Maharaja Sayajirao University of Baroda (MSU), India, where he completed his bachelor's degree in engineering. He followed this degree with master's in marketing management from the Institute of Management Development and Research, Pune, India. Pradhan came to Washington, DC, on a graduate fellowship from the Kogod School of Business at the American University (AU), to study for his second master's degree in accounting.

== IT philosophy ==
Pradhan's IT philosophy focuses on people first, innovation, agility and driving business value. He believes that technology is first about people. Technology-based innovation is his second theme. He believes that chief information officers (CIOs) have a dual role to play as chief innovation officers. This aspect focuses on creating an innovation life cycle within organizations consisting of ideation and crowd sourcing tools like DOT's IdeaHub, a process for selection of best ideas, a cloud based agility platform for quick deployment of "apps" that drive business value, an Amazon.com-like IT business catalogue, with a one-stop shop for basic, premium, and fee-for-service IT offerings, and an IT Vital Signs dashboard that measures progress.

Finally, he has promoted the concept of new IT—IT 2.0, as he calls it, is based on immediately providing significant public value and business value, and everything as a service (EAAS).

He is a strong proponent of using technology to deliver business results, for example; using emerging innovations like intelligent transportation systems and DOT's Connected Vehicles Program designed to leverage vehicle-to-vehicle (V2V), driverless cars, and vehicle-to-infrastructure (V2I) wireless communication in order to make driving safer by making cars, trucks, buses and other vehicles aware of the vehicles around them, even if the drivers aren't.

== Career ==
=== Pre Obama administration career ===
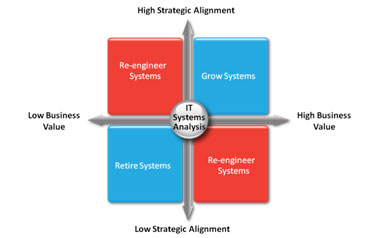
DOT IT Portfolio Rationalization

Pradhan also supported initiatives launched in the DC metro region in the mid-nineties; including Potomac Knowledge Way and Netpreneur, established by the Morino Institute, and the creation and expansion of the Northern Virginia Technology Council (NVTC) a membership and trade association for the technology community in Northern Virginia, now the largest technology council in the nation, currently serving about 1,000 organizations. After CIT, Pradhan co-founded a wireless startup and was the CEO in early 2000.

=== Obama administration career ===
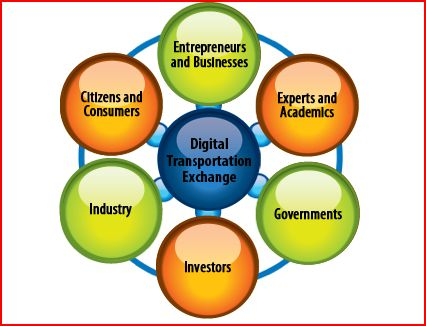
Digital Transportation Exchange (DTE)

In 2009, Pradhan joined DOT as its CIO. Pradhan was the chief advisor to the secretary of transportation, Ray LaHood, relating to information technology. In his role as the departmental CIO, Pradhan provided IT vision, strategy, planning and oversight for DOT's more than $3.0 billion IT portfolio, the sixth largest in the federal government. Pradhan's focus at DOT was on using technology to drive mission and business value, IT portfolio optimization, streamlining technology services, creating an IT business catalogue and online distribution (app store), holistic cyber security and public private partnerships like the Digital Transportation Ecosystem (DTE). Some of the DOT technology initiatives included:

- Modernization of the National Airspace System (NAS)- Called NextGEN, which upgrades the system from older ground-based radars to satellite and GPS based systems.
- Intelligent Transportation System (ITS)- A Connected Vehicles Program that improves vehicle-to-vehicle and vehicle-to-infrastructure safety via wireless communications and threat alerts.
- Modernizing Analog 911 Systems (E911)- Next generation digital VOIP 911 systems capable of receiving and sending internet protocol based voice, video and text.

=== Post Obama administration career ===
In September 2012, Pradhan established the nation's first Federal Technology Accelerator and Partner Consortium called Public Private Innovations (PPI). The goal of PPI is to drive public value through private growth by researching and analyzing government problems and matching them with business technology solutions; nurturing, adapting, and deploying technology platforms, products, and services for the federal marketplace and starting, building and growing government practices for new or existing IT contractors and technology suppliers.

In, March 2013, Pradhan cofounded GOVonomy.com, an emerging products technology marketplace focused on the public sector.

== Professional recognition ==
For his work at the Department of Transportation, Pradhan and the DOT were awarded:

- InformationWeek's 500 IT Innovators Awards in 2010
- the "Premier 100" award by Computerworld magazine in 2011
- the "Government "CIO 50"award from InformationWeek in 2011
- the "CIO 100" award by CIO magazine in 2012,
- and the White House "Open Government Leading Practices Awards" in 2012.
