= James Madison Dukes =

Intercollegiate sports teams of James Madison University

- University: James Madison University
- Nickname: Dukes
- NCAA: Division I (FBS)
- Conference: Sun Belt (primary); MAC (field hockey); American (women's lacrosse, women's swimming & diving) (full member July 1, 2027)
- Athletic director: Matt Roan
- Location: Harrisonburg, Virginia
- Varsity teams: 19
- Football stadium: Bridgeforth Stadium
- Basketball arena: Atlantic Union Bank Center
- Baseball stadium: Eagle Field at Veterans Memorial Park
- Soccer stadium: Sentara Park
- Colors: Purple and gold
- Mascot: Duke Dog
- Fight song: JMU Fight Song
- Website: jmusports.com

The James Madison Dukes are the intercollegiate athletics teams that represent James Madison University (JMU), in Harrisonburg, Virginia. The name "Dukes" is derived from Samuel Page Duke, the university's second president. The Dukes play as members of the Sun Belt Conference (SBC), which sponsors sports at the NCAA Division I level. In football, JMU participates in the Football Bowl Subdivision (FBS) of Division I, formerly known as Division I-A. JMU was a charter member of the Colonial Athletic Association (CAA), now known as the Coastal Athletic Association. The Dukes officially left the CAA and joined the SBC in 2022, participating in Division I FBS football and other sports sponsored by the conference. Beginning no later than July 1, 2028 JMU will join the American Conference.

The university mascot, Duke Dog, is frequently seen at many sporting events, and the school colors are royal purple and gold. JMU has won five NCAA national championships, third-most among Virginia colleges and universities, trailing only Virginia (35) and Old Dominion (28).

JMU's women's athletics tradition is among the oldest in the nation, dating nearly back to the institution's founding in 1908. Strong intercollegiate programs for women have been in place at the university since the early 1920s, and JMU was among the first of the nation's institutions to provide well-rounded overall intercollegiate offerings for females. Men's athletics began at JMU when it admitted its first men in the late 1940s, and a comprehensive program for men began evolving in the late 1960s when the university became fully coeducational.

James Madison University invested heavily in new athletic facilities throughout the tenure of President Linwood Rose. JMU built a new multimillion-dollar baseball and softball field complex that opened in 2010. Additionally, after the last football game of 2009, the university began an expansion of Bridgeforth Stadium that increased seating capacity to approximately 25,000. Construction was completed in time for the 2011 football season.

== Sports sponsored ==
JMU sponsors an 18-sport intercollegiate athletics program. JMU has men's athletics programs in baseball, basketball, football, golf, soccer, and tennis. For women, the university offers programs in basketball, cross country, field hockey, golf, lacrosse, soccer, softball, swimming and diving, tennis, track and field (indoor and outdoor), and volleyball.

Sun Belt Conference logo in JMU's colors

Men's sports	Women's sports
Baseball	Basketball
Basketball	Cross country
Football	Field hockey
Golf	Golf
Soccer	Lacrosse
Tennis	Soccer
	Softball
	Swimming and diving
	Tennis
	Track and field^{1}
	Volleyball
	Cheerleading
^{1} – includes both indoor and outdoor

=== Baseball ===
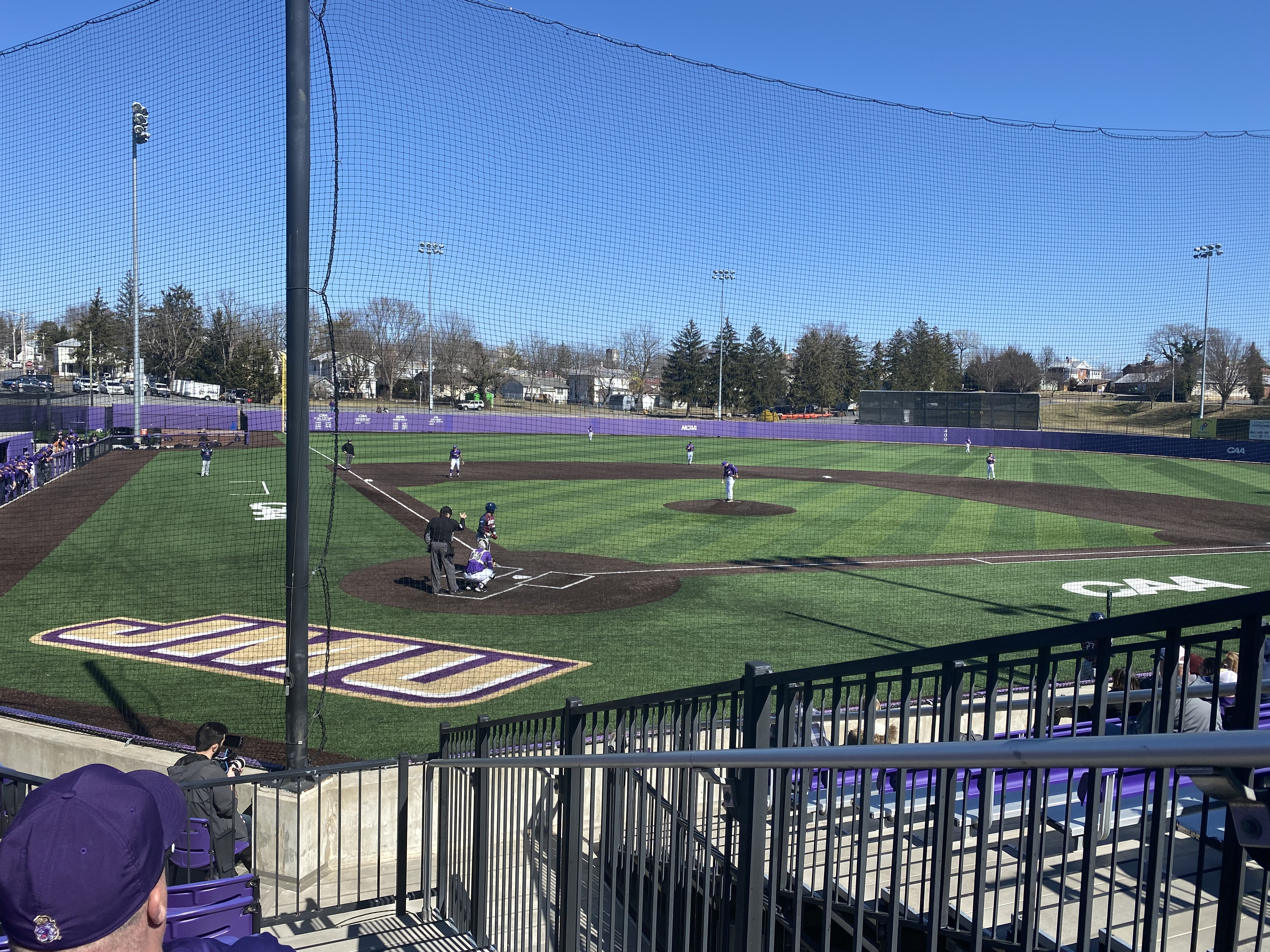
JMU Baseball Stadium

The JMU baseball team's head coach is Marlin Ikenberry. Founded in 1970, the JMU baseball team played at Long Field at Mauck Stadium through the end of the 2009 season. In 2010 they opened play at Eagle Field at Veterans Memorial Park, the school's new baseball and softball complex. The "Diamond Dukes," as the team is known, have compiled a 1092-670-8 all-time record and have made the NCAA tournament eight times, most recently in 2024. Billy Sample is JMU's most famous baseball alumnus, who played in 862 career major league games with the Texas Rangers, New York Yankees, and Atlanta Braves.

In the 2006 season, JMU had the top-two home run hitters in Division I. One of them, Kellen Kulbacki, placed in the top five in all three of the triple crown categories. Kulbacki received the 2006 National Player of the Year award as a sophomore. In 2008, the Dukes won their first CAA Championship defeating Towson University qualifying the team for the 2008 NCAA Division I baseball tournament hosted by North Carolina State University in Raleigh, North Carolina. The Dukes also won the CAA Championship in 2011 defeating Old Dominion University qualifying the team for the 2011 NCAA Division I baseball tournament.

=== Men's basketball ===
The men's basketball team at JMU was founded in 1945. On March 25, 2008, it was announced that Matt Brady, former head coach of Marist College, had accepted the position of Head Men's Basketball Coach. Brady replaced Dean Keener who resigned after four years as head coach. Prior to Dean Keener, Lou Campanelli and Charles "Lefty" Driesell enjoyed long and successful tenures in the position. The men moved to the new Atlantic Union Bank Center (capacity 8,500) in fall 2020 after a 28-season tenure in the James Madison University Convocation Center (capacity 6,426). The Dukes have appeared in the NCAA tournament five times, most recently in the 2013 tournament. Their combined record is 4–5.

They've also been selected to compete in the NIT five times, most recently at the end of the 1993 season. At the end of the 2008–09 season, the Dukes were selected for the inaugural CollegeInsider.com Postseason tournament. JMU made the semifinals before losing to CAA conference rival and eventual CIT champion Old Dominion Monarchs. The men's basketball team has compiled an all-time record of 567–432. On March 12, 2013, the Dukes defeated Northeastern University to win the CAA tournament, earning an automatic bid into the NCAA tournament. This is the first appearance in the tournament since 1994 and only the second time in school history they have won the CAA.

In 2013, James Madison University's men's basketball team won the CAA championship title for the first time since 1994. The Dukes then won their first NCAA tournament game in 30 years, defeating Long Island University-Brooklyn. The Dukes fell to Indiana in the second round, 83–62, finishing the season with a 21–15 record.

After the move to the Sun Belt Conference in 2022, the Dukes won their first Sun Belt title in the 2023-2024 conference tournament championship win over Arkansas State, 91-71. This win was followed with a run in the NCAA Tournament defeating No. 5 seeded Wisconsin in a 72-61 win. Coming into the tournament as a No. 12 seed, the Dukes made a push into the second round of the tournament and fell short to the No. 1 seeded Duke Blue Devils in a 93-55 loss.

=== Women's basketball ===
The women's basketball team was founded in 1920 making it one of the longest-running women's basketball programs in the country. The team has made the NCAA tournament eleven times, most recently in the 2013–14 season. They have gone to the WNIT six times. A perennial postseason participant throughout the 1980s, the program has seen a revival in recent years. Nationally recognized JMU players who have recently graduated include Meredith Alexis (2007) who has continued to play professional basketball in Europe. Alexis holds the CAA record for most career rebounds and was the school's all-time leading scorer before being passed by Tamera Young during the 2007–08 season. Young would graduate and finish the 2008 season having established a new all-time CAA scoring record and was selected in the first round (8th overall) of the 2008 WNBA draft.

Dawn Evans, was an Associated Press All-American honorable mention in 2009 after finishing the season as the nation's third leading scorer, and was named CAA Player of the Year in 2011. The team won the 2010 Colonial Athletic Association championship for the first time since 1989, defeating ODU in the championship game, and again in 2011, defeating the University of Delaware. In 2012 the team competed in the WNIT defeating Davidson, Wake Forest, South Florida, Virginia, and Syracuse to reach the championship game. Competing for their first ever WNIT title, they played Oklahoma State University in Stillwater, Oklahoma and lost 75–68. As of 2010, the women's basketball team had compiled an all-time record of 779–447–5. On January 6, 2015, the Dukes became the 3rd NCAA women's basketball team to reach 1000 wins in program history, defeating the UNC-Wilmington Seahawks 74–57. The Dukes women moved into Atlantic Union Bank Center alongside the men in fall 2020.

The James Madison University's women's basketball team have won 5 national championships along with 15 conference championships while competing in the CAA. Since moving to the SBC, the Dukes have won two regular season championship titles and one conference tournament championship in the 2022-2023 season, defeating Texas State, 81-51. Their most recent NCAA appearance came after the 2023 conference championship, making it as a No. 14 seed in the NCAA tournament, falling short in the first round to the Ohio State Buckeyes, 80-66.

=== Field hockey ===
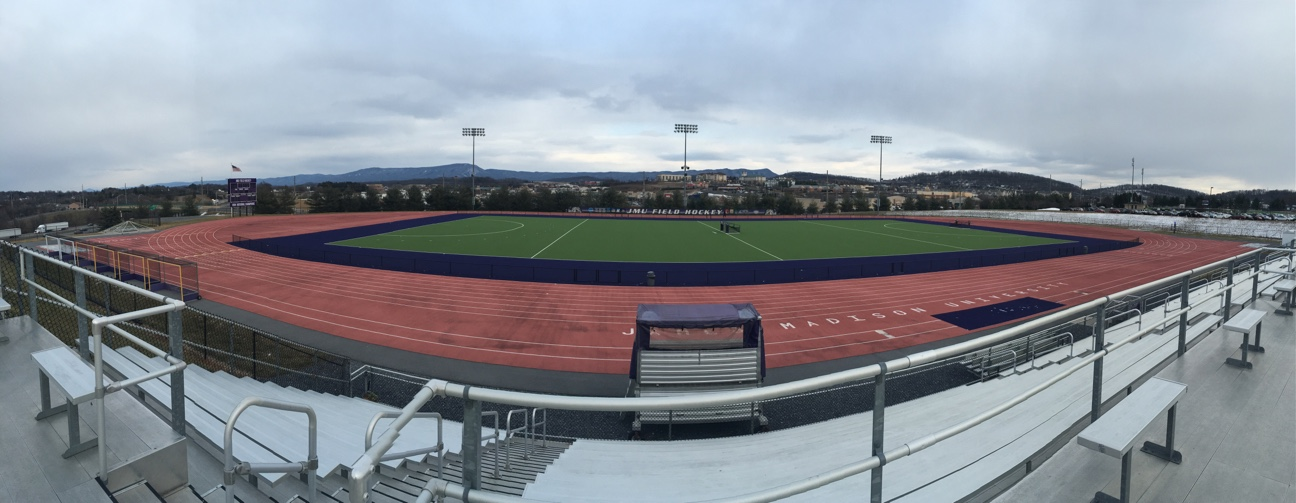
Field hockey field and athletics track

The field hockey team, currently coached by former Old Dominion field hockey standout and 1984 Olympian Christy Morgan, has enjoyed great success, winning the national championship in 1994 over North Carolina in double overtime. The team has made the NCAA tournament nine times since the tournament started in 1981, most recently in the 2008 season.

With JMU's move to the Sun Belt in 2022, a conference which does not sponsor field hockey, the Dukes field hockey program became an independent effective for the 2022 and 2023 seasons. In April 2023, the school and the Mid-American Conference reached an agreement for the field hockey team to become an affiliate member of the conference beginning in the 2024 season.

=== Football ===
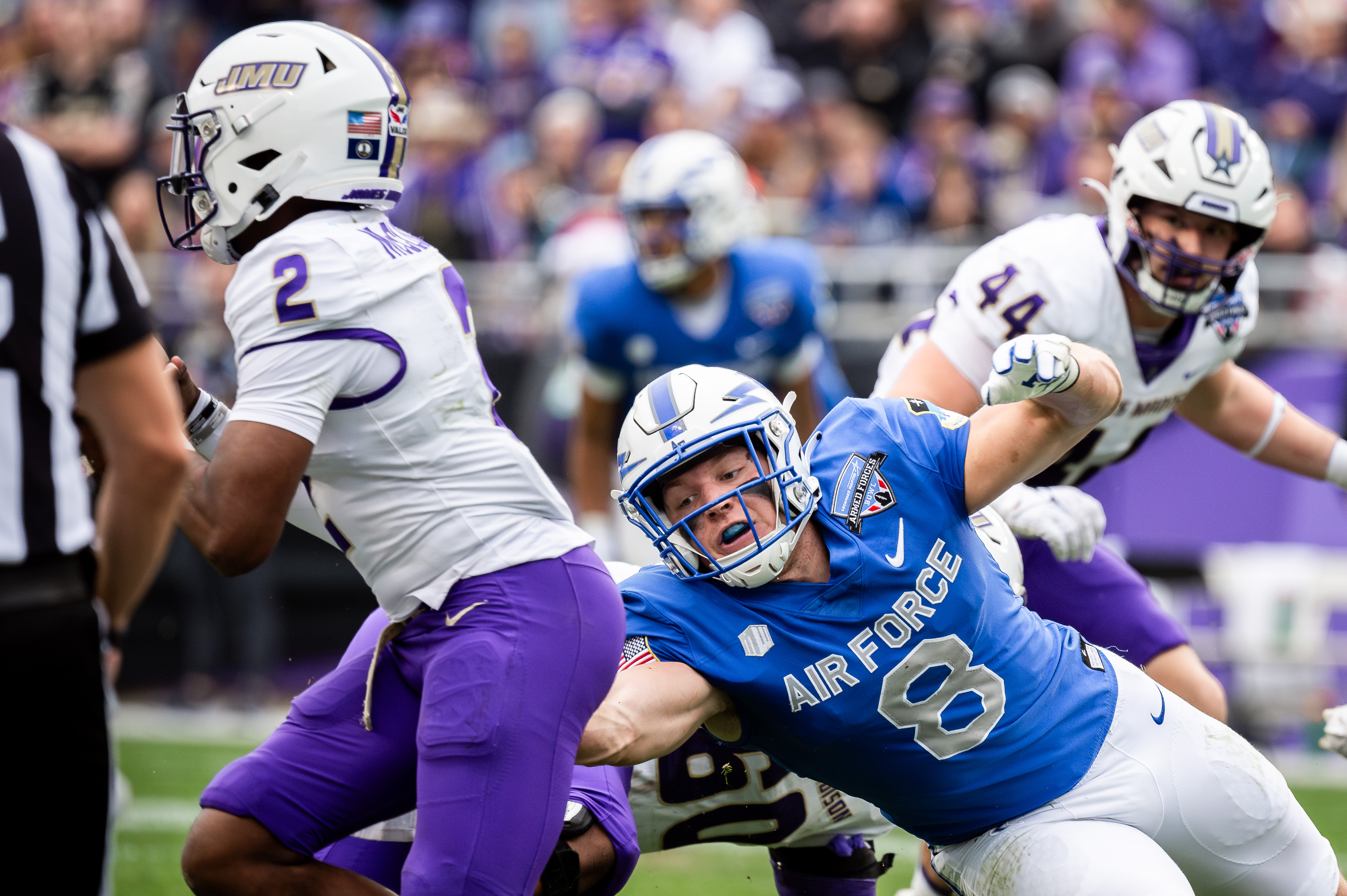
James Madison (in white) v Air Force at the 2023 Armed Forces Bowl

The Dukes played their first season in 1972 and were coached by Challace McMillin until 1984. Madison moved from NCAA Division III to NCAA Division I-AA in 1980 and would join what is now the Colonial Athletic Association's football conference in 1993 (at the time it was an independent entity known as the Yankee Conference). The football team's popularity grew with the addition of head coach Mickey Matthews in 1999, who in 2004 led JMU to their first National Championship, defeating Montana by a score of 31–21 in Chattanooga, Tennessee. The team finished with a 13–2 record, and in 2016 with a 14–1 record going undefeated in the FCS. The 2004 squad was the only team in history to win the title after playing four straight road playoff games. Since 2004, the JMU football team has appeared in the playoffs in 2006, 2007, 2008, 2011, 2014, 2015, 2016, 2017, 2018, and 2019. In 2022 JMU football moved from the FCS to the Sun Belt Conference in the FBS. Within their first three years playing in the FBS, they went on to win their first bowl game at the Boca Raton Bowl in Boca Raton, Florida

Since that time, the Dukes have proven to be one of the better teams in all of FCS football. In 2010, JMU went on the road to defeat Virginia Tech in what was one of the biggest upsets in college football history.

On January 7, 2017, JMU won their second National Championship in the program's history, defeating Youngstown State by a score of 28–14 in Frisco, Texas. During the 2017 season, JMU continued its dominance over FCS competition, reaching its second consecutive title game with a 14–0 record before losing a close game to emerging rival North Dakota State, 17–13. The decade of dominance by NDSU, combined with the short-term dominance by James Madison, made it one of the most anticipated title games in the history of FCS Football.

In 2025, JMU became the first SBC member to reach the College Football Playoff.

Notable Dukes include Charles Haley, one of only two players to win five Super Bowl rings and inductee of both the Pro Football Hall of Fame and College Football Hall of Fame; Scott Norwood, the Buffalo Bills' all-time leading scorer; and Gary Clark, an All-Pro wide receiver for the Washington Redskins (now the Washington Commanders).

=== Women's lacrosse ===
JMU has fielded a women's lacrosse team every year since 1969, when the program began. It became a member of the CAA in 1992 and has played its conference schedule against Colonial teams every year since then. The Dukes currently compete as an affiliate member of the American Conference (known as the American Athletic Conference before July 2025).

JMU lacrosse won the school's fourth Division I National Championship in May 2018, when JMU's senior-laden team capped a Cinderella run with a 16–15 win over Boston College.

== National championships and playoff appearances ==
National Championships
Football (DI-AA/FCS)	2004, 2016
Field Hockey	1994
Women's Lacrosse	2018
Archery (varsity)
–women, recurve	1982, 1990, 1997
–women, compound	1995, 1998, 1999, 2006
–men, recurve	2007
–men, compound	2000, 2001, 2005, 2006, 2007
–mixed, recurve	2007
–mixed, compound	1995, 1998, 2000, 2006, 2007
College Football Playoff appearances
Football	2025
Division I FCS Playoff appearances
Football	1987, 1991, 1994, 1995, 1999, 2004, 2006, 2007, 2008, 2011, 2014, 2015, 2016, 2017, 2018, 2019, 2020
Men's College World Series appearances
Baseball	1983
Women's College World Series appearances
Softball	2021
NCAA tournament Appearances
Baseball	1976, 1980, 1981, 1983, 1988, 1995, 2002, 2008, 2011, 2024
Men's Basketball	1981, 1982, 1983, 1994, 2013, 2024
Women's Basketball	1986, 1987, 1988, 1989, 1995, 2007, 2010, 2011, 2014, 2015, 2016, 2023
Field Hockey	1993, 1994, 1995, 1997, 1999, 2002, 2006, 2007, 2008
Women's Lacrosse	1995, 1997, 1998, 1999, 2000, 2001, 2003, 2004, 2006, 2010, 2011, 2015, 2016, 2017, 2018, 2019, 2021, 2022
Men's Soccer	1971, 1972, 1973, 1976, 1992, 1993, 1994, 1995, 1996, 2000, 2001, 2005, 2011, 2014, 2018
Women's Soccer	1995, 1996, 1997, 1998, 1999, 2002, 2004, 2007, 2008, 2010
Softball	2009, 2014, 2015, 2016, 2017, 2018, 2019, 2021
Volleyball	2016, 2017, 2022

== Rivalries ==
=== Old Dominion ===
On October 26, 2022, the JMU Dukes and in-state rival Old Dominion University announced the official beginning of the "Royal Rivalry". As the Virginia-based schools within the Sun Belt Conference, they will compete for an all-sports trophy that contains a football component and draws its name from the royal inspiration of both schools' mascots.

== Title IX compliance ==
On September 29, 2006, the James Madison University Board of Visitors announced that ten sports teams would be eliminated effective July 1, 2007. The affected teams were men's archery, cross country, gymnastics, indoor track, outdoor track, swimming, and wrestling, as well as women's archery, fencing, and gymnastics. The stated reason for the cuts was to comply with Title IX requirements, specifically that the ratio of male-to-female student athletes match the whole student population. Many students were angered by the cuts, complaining that only less-popular sports were affected, and not sports such as football. Numerous editorials have appeared in newspapers across the country, both in support of and against the decision. On October 12, the United States Olympic Committee sent a letter to President Rose and Athletic Director Jeff Bourne, asking them to reconsider the decision to eliminate all ten teams.

This action, however, was not without precedent. In March 2001, JMU's Board of Visitors was presented with four options for bringing the athletic program into compliance with Title IX. At that time, the options as presented to the board were to maintain the status quo, eliminate eight teams as recommended by JMU's Centennial Sports Committee, create a two-tiered system consisting of scholarship and non-scholarship teams as recommended by the administration, or raise student fees to fund an endowment for athletic scholarships as recommended by athletic coaches. Board of Visitors Athletic Committee chair Pablo Cuevas was paraphrased in The Breeze as stating that the option of maintaining the status quo was not viable due to concerns regarding Title IX. At that time, the teams under consideration for elimination were men's wrestling, swimming, archery, gymnastics, and tennis, and women's gymnastics, archery, and fencing. The Board of Visitors, in a unanimous vote, ultimately decided to adopt the administration's recommendation of a two-tiered system of scholarship and non-scholarship teams. The non-scholarship teams were men's swimming, indoor and outdoor track and field, cross country, golf, wrestling, tennis, gymnastics, and women's swimming. Athletic director Jeff Bourne stated that the plan to eliminate scholarship funding would be implemented gradually over four to five years, as all then-active scholarships would be honored, and that verbal commitments to scholarships made by coaches to potential recruits would also be honored.
