= Sylvia Mathews Burwell =

American government official (born 1965)

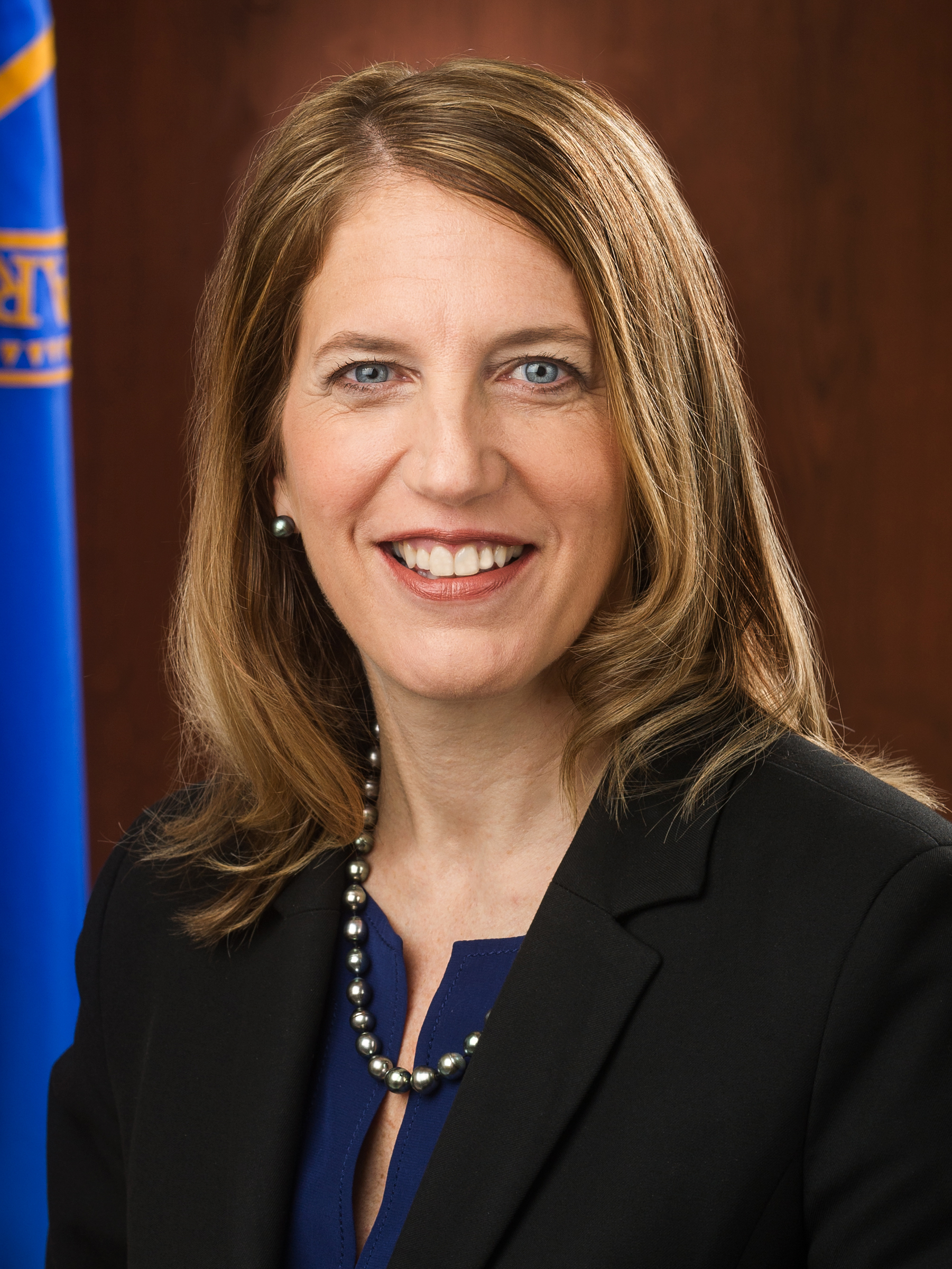
- Official portrait, 2014

15th President of American University
- In office June 1, 2017 – June 30, 2024
- Preceded by: Cornelius M. Kerwin
- Succeeded by: Jonathan R. Alger

22nd United States Secretary of Health and Human Services
- In office June 9, 2014 – January 20, 2017
- President: Barack Obama
- Deputy: Bill Corr; Mary Wakefield (acting)
- Preceded by: Kathleen Sebelius
- Succeeded by: Tom Price

39th Director of the Office of Management and Budget
- In office April 24, 2013 – June 9, 2014
- President: Barack Obama
- Deputy: Brian Deese
- Preceded by: Jeff Zients (acting)
- Succeeded by: Brian Deese (acting)

Deputy Director of the Office of Management and Budget
- In office October 21, 1998 – January 20, 2001
- President: Bill Clinton
- Preceded by: Jack Lew
- Succeeded by: Sean O'Keefe

White House Deputy Chief of Staff for Policy
- In office January 20, 1997 – October 21, 1998
- President: Bill Clinton
- Preceded by: Harold M. Ickes
- Succeeded by: Maria Echaveste

Personal details
- Born: Sylvia Mary Mathews; June 23, 1965 (age 61) Hinton, West Virginia, U.S.
- Party: Democratic
- Spouse: Stephen Burwell
- Children: 2
- Education: Harvard University (BA); Worcester College, Oxford (BA)

Sylvia Mary Burwell (née Mathews; born June 24, 1965) is an American government and non-profit executive who is president of the Harvard Board of Overseers and was the 15th president of American University from 2017 to 2024. Burwell was the first woman to serve as the university's president. A member of the Democratic Party, Burwell earlier served as the 22nd United States secretary of health and human services from 2014 to 2017 and as 39th director of the Office of Management and Budget from 2013 to 2014.

A West Virginia native, Burwell first worked for the United States government in Washington, D.C., during the presidency of Bill Clinton. Burwell helped form the National Economic Council in 1993. Burwell later served as Chief of Staff to Secretary of the Treasury Robert Rubin, Deputy White House Chief of Staff to Erskine Bowles, and finally, deputy director of the Office of Management and Budget.

Between her times in government, Burwell served as president of Walmart's charitable foundation focused on ending hunger, beginning in January 2012. Burwell was earlier the president of the Global Development Program of the Bill & Melinda Gates Foundation, where her program focused on combating world poverty through agricultural development, financial services for the poor, and global libraries. She was chief operating officer and executive director before its reorganization in 2006. She joined the Gates Foundation in 2001, at the end of the Clinton presidency. President Barack Obama nominated Burwell to lead the United States Department of Health and Human Services on April 11, 2014. Her nomination was confirmed by the Senate on June 5, 2014, by a vote of 78–17. She served as secretary until the end of the Obama administration.

== Early life and education ==
Mathews was born and raised in Hinton, West Virginia, a small town with a population of approximately 3,000. Her mother, Cleo (née Maroudas) Mathews, was a teacher who also served as Hinton's mayor from 2001 to 2009; her father, Dr. William Peter Mathews, an optometrist. Her father presided over the local Episcopal Church when there was no minister.

Her maternal grandparents, Vasiliki (Mpakares) and Dennis N. Maroudas, were Greek immigrants, as were her paternal grandparents. Her grandparents owned a sweet shop in Hinton. Mathews has one older sister, four years her senior.

Mathews first showed an interest in politics while still in grade school, when she became involved with her best friend's father's campaign for county commissioner and Jay Rockefeller's first campaign for governor. Mathews served as her student body president and played on her school's basketball team. She graduated as valedictorian of her high school class.

In 1982, she was a Youth For Understanding exchange student in Japan. While still in college, she served as an intern for West Virginia Congressman Nick Rahall, as a governor's aide to Massachusetts Governor Michael Dukakis, and as a researcher for the Michael Dukakis 1988 presidential campaign.

Mathews earned a Bachelor of Arts degree government from Harvard University in 1987. She then enrolled at the University of Oxford, where she became a Rhodes Scholar at Worcester College, and, in her spare time, a rower. She graduated from Oxford with a second bachelor's degree in philosophy, politics, and economics. She has since been appointed as an honorary fellow of Worcester College.

== Career ==
=== Early career and the Clinton White House ===
Mathews began her career in 1990 as an associate with the New York consulting firm McKinsey & Company. In 1992, Mathews joined the Bill Clinton 1992 presidential campaign and after Clinton's election led the economic team for the president-elect. Following Clinton's inauguration, Mathews, working with Robert Rubin, helped establish the National Economic Council (NEC). She served as the first staff director of the NEC from 1993 to 1995. While Mathews was at NEC, the White House pushed for healthcare reform. Mathews was among those in the administration who advocated for finding ways, apart from legislation, to curb healthcare costs.

When Rubin became secretary of the treasury in 1995, Mathews was named to be his chief of staff. She testified before a Senate committee during the Whitewater investigations regarding her search of Vince Foster's garbage and the fate of the documents she discovered. Mathews told the committee she had been looking for an indication as to why Foster had committed suicide and denied ordering any documents destroyed.

In 1997 Chief of Staff Erskine Bowles recruited Mathews to be his deputy chief of staff after being impressed with her intelligence during an Oval Office meeting. Mathews became one of two deputy chiefs of staff, serving alongside John Podesta. She was deputy chief of staff for policy, charged with the task of keeping the White House focused on its agenda amid the impeachment of Clinton.

Bowles later praised her as smart, hardworking, and skilled at getting people to work together, saying, "I've never known one person who does all those things as well." Bowles resigned in 1998, at which point Podesta was named chief of staff, and Mathews moved to the Office of Management and Budget (OMB), where she took the role of deputy director under Jack Lew. Mathews remained at OMB for the remainder of Clinton's presidency during a time of three budget surpluses.

=== Charitable foundations and other private sector activities ===
In 2001 Mathews relocated to Seattle, Washington, to work for the Bill and Melinda Gates Foundation, the largest philanthropic organization in the United States, as an executive vice president. The following year, she became chief operating officer of the Foundation. The Foundation reorganized in 2006, naming Mathews president of the foundation's Global Development Program. Mathews was involved in awarding grants to improve health outcomes in the developing world, including stopping the spread of HIV and other diseases and making contraception more readily available.

She served on the board of the University of Washington Medical Center from 2002 to 2005. During that time, the board oversaw an upgrade to the medical center's electronic medical records and system for tracking patient outcomes. The board was also tasked with setting up a compliance program to fix a Medicare billing irregularity that had resulted in a settlement with federal investigators. She was a Director of MetLife and Metropolitan Life Insurance Company from January 2004 to April 2013. Mathews also served on the boards of the Council on Foreign Relations and the Nike Foundation Advisory Group.

In 2005 Mathews was chosen by the Wall Street Journal as one of The 50 Women to Watch – 2005 worldwide for her work with the Gates Foundation. In 2008, known as Sylvia Mathews Burwell following her 2007 marriage, she was named Obama/Biden Transition Agency Review Lead for the Federal Deposit Insurance Corporation. Burwell remained with the Gates Foundation until 2011. She officially joined the Wal-Mart Foundation, which focuses on ending hunger in the United States, as the organization's president in January 2012. (Note: Burwell was paid through Wal-Mart Stores, Inc. where she had the title of vice president.) Burwell relocated to Bentonville, Arkansas, for the position.

=== Office of Management and Budget Director ===
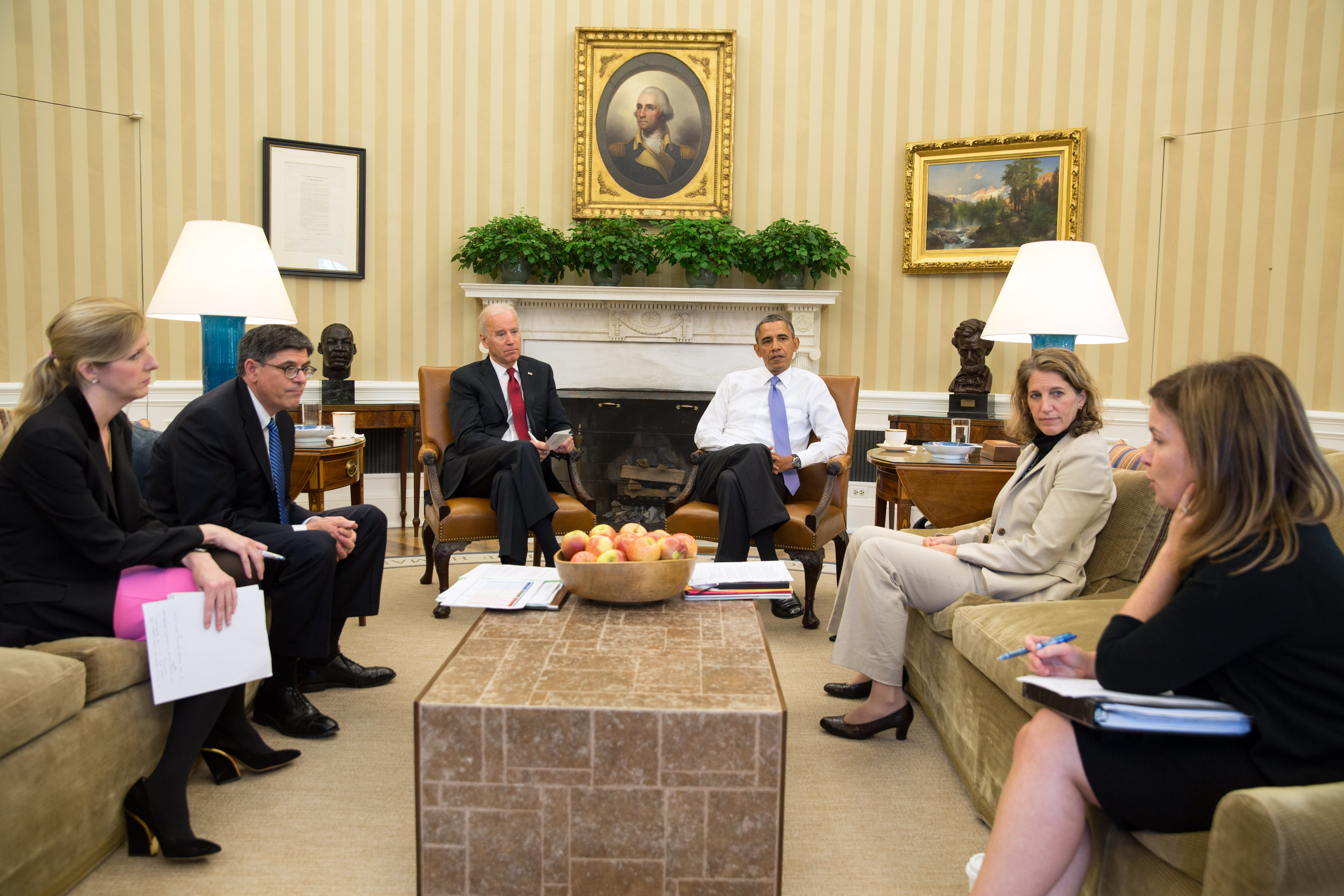
Kathryn Ruemmler, Jack Lew, Sylvia Mathews Burwell, and Alyssa Mastromonaco update President Barack Obama and Vice President Joe Biden on the government shutdown, October 1, 2013.

On March 3, 2013, President Barack Obama nominated Burwell to be the director of the White House Office of Management and Budget. A confirmation hearing was held on April 10. Burwell's nomination received bipartisan support, culminating in the U.S. Senate confirming Burwell as Director by a 96–0 vote. With her confirmation, Burwell became only the second woman to serve as OMB Director, the first being Alice Rivlin, who held the position from 1994 to 1996.

Burwell entered the job at a time when conservatives wanted to decrease spending and defund Obama's signature healthcare legislation, the Affordable Care Act, also known as Obamacare. Although Congress tried to negotiate a continuing resolution to fund the government pending negotiation of the larger budget, it became clear on September 30, 2013, that no temporary agreement would be reached. Without an agreed-upon budget from Congress, Burwell as Director was tasked with initiating a federal government shutdown, the first U.S. federal government shutdown in 17 years. Burwell sent a memo advising agencies and executive departments to shut down, including the closing of national parks, visitors' centers, and even the "panda-cam" at the National Zoo. The shutdown lasted 16 days. Once the government reopened, Burwell helped negotiate a two-year budget deal to avoid future shutdowns.

=== Secretary of Health and Human Services ===
On April 11, 2014, Obama nominated Burwell to be the next secretary of health and human services, succeeding Kathleen Sebelius, who had announced her resignation the day before. At the time of her nomination, Obama praised Burwell as a "proven manager and she knows how to deliver results." The Senate confirmed Burwell as Secretary on June 5, 2014, by a vote of 78–17. She was sworn into office on June 9, 2014. As of 2014, the secretary oversaw the Department of Health and Human Services (HHS), which included the equivalent of 77,000 full-time employees and the management of several agencies and programs including Medicare and Medicaid, the National Institutes of Health, the Food and Drug Administration, and the Centers for Disease Control and Prevention. At the end of her tenure, Burwell received praise from Democratic and Republican senators.

==== Ebola epidemic response ====
With an Ebola epidemic devastating West Africa, Burwell began holding daily meetings on July 28, 2014, as part of the efforts of the United States government, including the Department of HHS, to prevent the further spread of the disease. Starting on September 30, other Obama administration officials began giving daily public briefings while Burwell took less of a public role, although she did take part in a number of public meetings. In the fall of 2014, the first known death from Ebola in the United States occurred. The Obama administration proposed devoting $6 billion to fight the spread of Ebola, including $2 billion for the State Department and USAID. The plan included provisions to help U.S. hospitals become better prepared and to support global health initiatives aimed at containing the disease in Africa. Congress allocated $5.4 billion to fight Ebola in response to the Obama administration request. Burwell and other Obama administration officials sought to assure the public that the American health system was prepared to deal with Ebola cases and that the chances of a full outbreak in the United States were low.

==== Zika response ====
In February 2016, in response to the spread of the Zika virus, the Obama administration requested that Congress appropriate $1.9 billion to fight the spread of the disease. Congress did not initially take action, leaving Burwell to direct the Department of Health and Human Services to reprogram $589 million in funds previously designated as part of the response to Ebola, to fight the spread of the Zika virus.

Of the initial Zika funding, the Centers for Disease Control (CDC) received $222 million to lead the domestic fight against the virus with the National Institutes of Health and the Biomedical Advanced Research and Development Authority splitting $152 million for the domestic effort. In response to Congressional complaints that the money was not being spent fast enough, Burwell informed Congress that without further funding, the CDC would deplete its budget to fight Zika by September 30, 2016. After Burwell moved funding from other HHS programs, Congress finally appropriated $1.1 billion to fight the spread of Zika in the United States. By the end of September 2016, the United States reported 23,000 cases in the territory of Puerto Rico, 3,000 cases in the states, and 21 babies born in the United States with microcephaly testing positive for Zika.

==== The Affordable Care Act ====
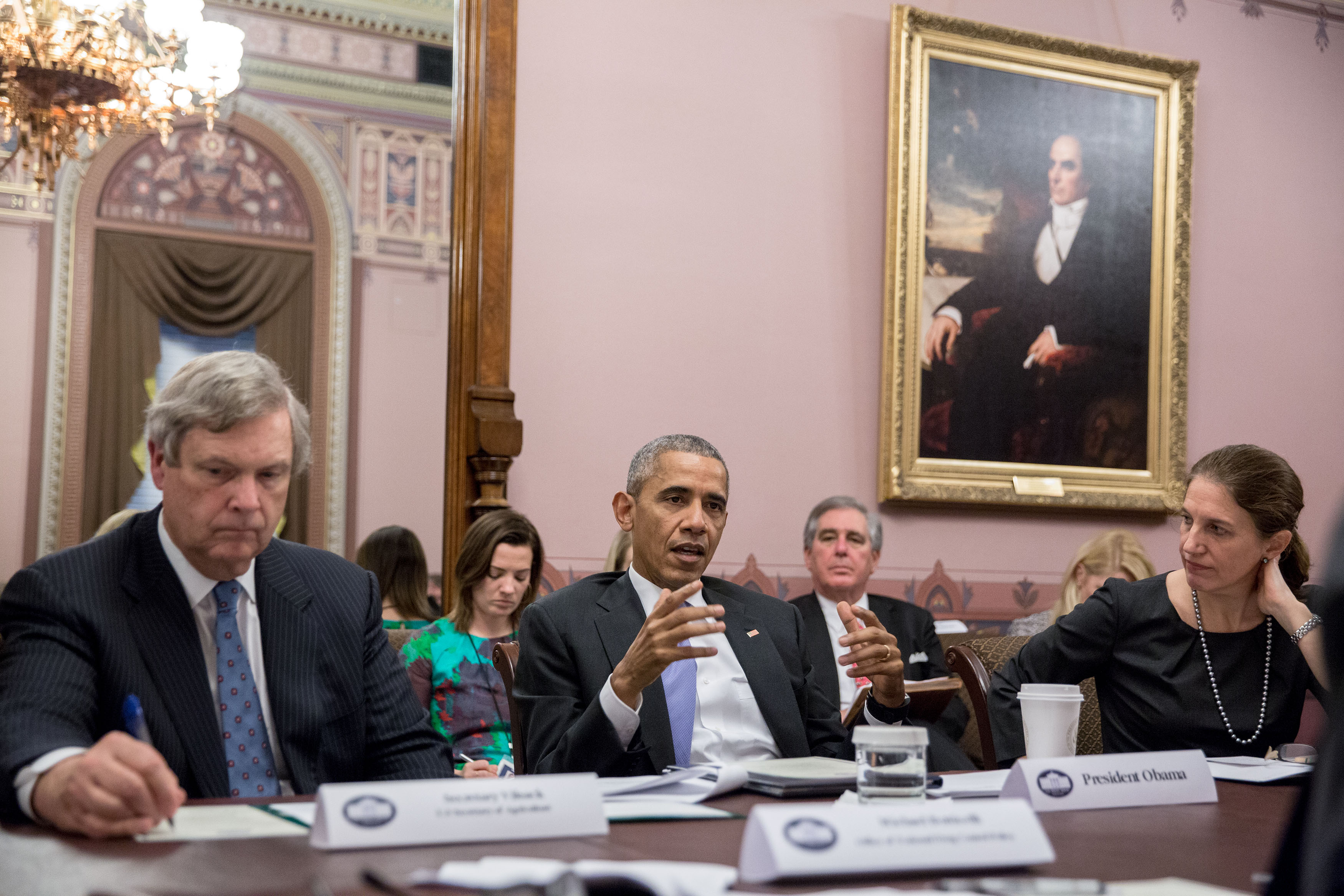
Rural Council meeting in the Eisenhower Executive Office Building of the White House, February 3, 2016. From left to right: Agriculture Secretary Tom Vilsack, President Barack Obama, and Burwell.

Burwell's tenure as HHS secretary began ahead of the Affordable Care Act's second open-enrollment period for healthcare insurance in November 2014. In preparation for the enrollment period, Burwell hired additional staff to coordinate operations. The first open-enrollment period, which had occurred during Secretary Sebelius' tenure, was marred by technical difficulties with the Healthcare.gov website. In preparation for the second enrollment period, the HealthCare.gov website underwent various testing actions. The Secretary noted the website had been reconfigured, reducing the number of screens from over seventy to just over a dozen website pages to make the application process smoother.

Because of her position as Secretary of HHS, Burwell was the named party in multiple lawsuits related to the Affordable Care Act. One month into her tenure, the Supreme Court decided Burwell vs. Hobby Lobby, where the court struck down the implementation of the Affordable Care Act's contraception mandate as violating Hobby Lobby's religious freedom. The Supreme Court also decided King v. Burwell, a case in which the Court upheld the Affordable Care Act's subsidies for healthcare plans purchased on federal exchanges.

In July 2016, ahead of the 2016 elections, Burwell began touring, giving speeches on the success of the Affordable Care Act and its potential for the future. The election resulted in Republicans winning control of the Presidency and Congress, having campaigned to repeal the law. Burwell continued to advocate for the Affordable Care Act, arguing it was "woven into the fabric of our nation". Since its inception, the law had led to coverage for 20 million more people, and Burwell argued the complexity of the law meant that repealing any part would have effects throughout the healthcare system. Burwell and the Department of HHS devised the "Coverage Matters" campaign to increase public support for the law and to boost enrollment.

=== American University ===
Shortly after leaving her position as HHS secretary, Burwell became American University's 15th president, and the first woman to serve as president. Burwell began her tenure on June 1, 2017.

In 2020, Burwell was appointed by the Council on Foreign Relations to co-chair (alongside Frances Townsend) the Independent Task Force on Improving Pandemic Preparedness.

In early August 2023, Burwell announced she would be stepping down as American University's 15th President. A search committee was formed to find Burwell's successor. In March 2024, the University announced it had selected James Madison University President, Jonathan Alger to become American University's 16th President. Burwell stated she intends to continue working as a distinguished lecturer for AU's Sine Institute for Policy and Politics. Jonathan Alger succeeded her on July 1, 2024.

During her seven years as AU president, Burwell led the development and implementation of the Changemakers for a Changing World strategic plan and the plan for Inclusive Excellence, launched and completed the $500 million Change Can’t Wait campaign, grew the university’s endowment by more than 50 percent, doubled the university’s research funding from external sources, and made the largest investment in student thriving in the university’s history. The Change Can’t Wait campaign has already made an impact – creating four new and expanded research centers, eight endowed faculty positions, more than 170 scholarships, and more. Burwell's government experience proved crucial to her leadership at AU during the COVID crisis. As Lilian Baeza-Mendoza, a faculty trustee of the university told the Washington Post: “Being there for the community not only as a president, but also being able to answer questions during those very difficult times — that was a tremendous help as we were navigating an unusual place.”

=== Harvard University Board of Overseers ===
A year after stepping down president of American University, Burwell was elected the president of the Harvard University Board of Overseers for the 2025-2026 academic year. She succeeded Vivian Hunt, the chief innovation officer of UnitedHealth Group, to fill the seat on Harvard's alumni advisory board. Burwell graduated from Harvard in 1987 with a Bachelor of Arts in government. She has been a member of the Board since 2023 and her term will end in 2029. In 2026, Burwell's role was expanded to membership of the Harvard Corporation, Harvard's governing board, with her service beginning on July 1. According to the Harvard Gazette's announcement of Burwell's election, the Board shares governance with the President and Fellows of Harvard College:

The Board of Overseers is one of Harvard’s two governing boards and its members are made up of and elected by Harvard alumni. Formally established in 1642, the board plays an integral role in the governance of the University. As a central part of its work, the board directs the visitation process, the primary means for periodic external assessment of Harvard’s Schools and departments. Through its array of standing committees, and the roughly 50 visiting committees that report to them, the board probes the quality of Harvard’s programs and assures that the University remains true to its charter as a place of learning.

Her election came as the Trump administration placed unpreceded pressure on Harvard to comply with the government's policies on immigration, Gaza war protests and research.

The Harvard Crimson, the university's student newspaper, wrote that Burwell's election "places Harvard’s second-highest governing body in the hands of an academic with deep experience in the same federal agency that is now spearheading a slew of investigations into Harvard and slashing hundreds of millions of dollars in research funding."

Burwell told the Gazette, the official news site run by Harvard Public Affairs and Communications:

This is a time of serious consequence for higher education, our nation’s students, and for Harvard. I look forward to working closely with President Garber, with my colleagues on the Board of Overseers, with members of the Harvard campus and alumni community to listen and to advance the University’s core teaching, learning, and research mission so that other students can benefit and the University can continue its work improving the lives, livelihoods, and communities of people across the country and around the world.

== Personal life ==
Mathews met lawyer and Seattle native Stephen Burwell in 2005 during her time working for the Gates Foundation. Burwell proposed in Bellepoint Park, a park Mathews had visited often as a child in Hinton, and the pair married in Seattle in 2007. The couple has two children.

During Burwell's tenure as Secretary of Health and Human Services, her husband stayed home to care for their children.

== See also ==
- Centers for Disease Control and Prevention
- Food and Drug Administration
- List of female United States Cabinet members
- List of people who have held multiple United States Cabinet-level positions
- Woodrow Wilson International Center for Scholars

== Notes ==
Political offices
Preceded by Jeff Zients; Acting	Director of the Office of Management and Budget; 2013–2014	Succeeded by Brian Deese; Acting
Preceded by Kathleen Sebelius	United States Secretary of Health and Human Services; 2014–2017	Succeeded by Tom Price
Academic offices
Preceded by Cornelius M. Kerwin	President of American University; 2017–present	Incumbent
U.S. order of precedence (ceremonial)
Preceded by Jeh Johnson as Former U.S. Cabinet Member	Order of precedence of the United States as Former U.S. Cabinet Member	Succeeded by Julian Castro as Former U.S. Cabinet Member
