= Jonathan R. Alger =

American academic

Jonathan Alger
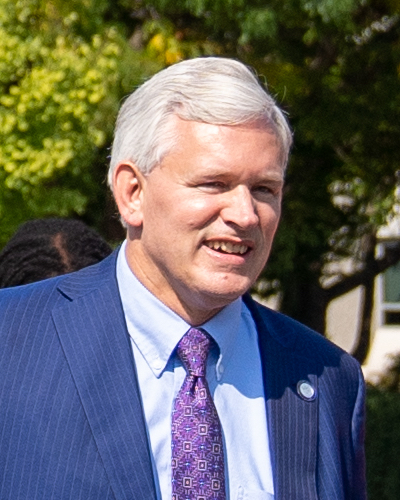
- Alger in 2019

16th President of American University
- In office July 1, 2024 – June 30, 2026
- Preceded by: Sylvia Mathews Burwell
- Succeeded by: David Marchick

6th President of James Madison University
- In office July 1, 2012 – June 30, 2024
- Preceded by: Linwood H. Rose
- Succeeded by: James C. Schmidt

Personal details
- Born: Jonathan Roberts Alger Rochester, New York, U.S.
- Spouse: Mary Ann Alger
- Education: Swarthmore College (BA); Harvard University (JD)
- Website: University website

Jonathan Roberts Alger is an American lawyer and academic, currently serving as the inaugural joint American 250 Fellow with the American Council on Education and the American Association of Colleges and Universities since July 2026.

He served as the 16th president of American University from July 2024 to June 2026 and as the 6th president of James Madison University from 2012 to 2024.

Alger is also a legal scholar with expertise on higher education policy and law and co-taught a seminar on leadership in the James Madison University Honors Program.

== Education ==
Alger graduated from Swarthmore College, where he received his B.A. with high honors in political science with a history minor and a concentration in public policy with membership in Phi Beta Kappa. He then earned his Juris Doctor (J.D.) with cum laude honors from Harvard Law School.

== Career ==
Before becoming president at JMU, Alger was the senior vice president and general counsel at Rutgers University. Before working at Rutgers, Alger served as assistant general counsel at the University of Michigan, where he played a key role. In the university’s efforts in two landmark Supreme Court cases on diversity and admissions he coordinated one of the largest amicus brief coalitions in Supreme Court history. At both Rutgers and Michigan, he taught courses, seminars and independent studies in law, higher education and public policy. He has also taught interdisciplinary courses for graduate students in law, education, public policy and information.

Prior to his time at University of Michigan, he served as counsel for the American Association of University Professors, where he advised institutions on policies, procedures and cases on issues such as academic freedom, shared governance, tenure, due process and discrimination. Earlier in his career he served as attorney-advisor for the United States Department of Education's Office for Civil Rights. He also previously served as an associate in the law firm of Morgan, Lewis & Bockius.

Because of Alger’s background in civil rights law, he has been credited with understanding the intricacies of how the Office for Civil Rights interprets and enforces Title IX. Alger's track record promoting campus civic engagement has been positive. In 2018, Alger was one of the first recipients of the ALL IN Campus Democracy Challenge Standout Campus President Award. In February 2024, Alger was appointed to the initiative's President’s Council.

While at JMU, President Alger declined to comment on a specific assault case, but acknowledged that he was concerned about public perceptions of the school and appeared in a video created by JMU to raise public awareness of the problem. He also promised in a letter to the university community that the institution would do everything in its power to help keep its students safe.

During his 12 years at JMU, the university had successes in funding (increase in external research funding, and doubled the endowment), sports (moved up to the highest level of football and joined the Sun Belt Conference), and student programs (a new first time student scholarship, and the Madison Center for Civic Engagement launched).

On March 18, 2024, American University announced Alger's appointment as the university's 16th president. On July 1, 2024, Alger succeeded Sylvia Burwell, who had served as the university's first female president since 2017.

On May 27, 2026, Alger announced that he would step down from the presidency on June 30, to accept a joint appointment as the inaugural America 250 Fellow with the American Council on Education and the American Association of Colleges and Universities. David Marchick succeeded him on July 1, 2026.

On September 4, 2026, Spotswood Hall, located on JMU's historic quad, was renamed Alger Hall. Alger Hall is now home to the Madison Center for Civic Engagement and the Civic Leadership Residential Learning Community for first-year students, according to JMU’s Official Website. Previously, the Center for Civic Engagement was split between Burruss Hall and Wilson Hall.

== Boards, memberships and service ==
Current appointments:

- Board Member, Division I Board of Directors for the National Collegiate Athletic Association
- Board Member, American Association of Colleges & Universities

Past appointments:

- President, Board of Directors of the National Association of College and University Attorneys
- Board Member, The American Bar Association’s Accreditation Committee
- Board Member, The National Heart, Lung and Blood Institute's Advisory Council at the National Institutes of Health

== Published works ==
- Alger, Jonathan R. (September 2013). "A supreme challenge: Achieving the educational and societal benefits of diversity after the Supreme Court's Fisher decision". Journal of Diversity in Higher Education. 6 (3): 147–154. doi:10.1037/a0034355.
- Alger, Jonathan R. (April 2010). "From Desegregation to Diversity and beyond: Our Evolving Legal Conversation on Race and Higher Education". Journal of College & University Law. 36 (3): 983.
- Alger, Jonathan R. (June 2008). "Colleges Must Be Forearmed with Effective Policies on Weapons". Chronicle of Higher Education. 54 (39): A32.
- Alger, Jonathan R. (June 2008). "Effective Practices for Academic Leaders". Legal Issues for Academic Leaders. 3 (2): 16.
- Alger, Jonathan R. (February 2005). "Putting the Michigan Rulings Into Practice". Chronicle of Higher Education: B28.
- Alger, Jonathan R.; Krislov, Marvin (2004). "You've Got to Have Friends: Lessons Learned from the Role of Amici in the University of Michigan Cases". Journal of College and University Law. 30: 503–506.

== Personal history and family ==
Alger was born and raised outside Rochester, New York. His wife, Mary Ann, has a B.S. from Auburn University and an M.B.A. from the University of Miami. The Algers have a daughter named Eleanor.

Alger has sung with acclaimed choral groups that have toured internationally, made professional recordings and performed on national television. Additionally, he used to play trombone.

Academic offices
Preceded by Linwood H. Rose	President of James Madison University; 2012–2024	Succeeded by
Preceded by Sylvia Mathews Burwell	President of American University; 2024	Incumbent
