= Ronald E. Carrier =

Dr. Ronald E. Carrier

4th President of James Madison University
- In office 1971–1998
- Preceded by: G. Tyler Miller
- Succeeded by: Linwood H. Rose

Personal details
- Born: August 18, 1932 Bluff City, Tennessee, U.S.
- Died: September 18, 2017 (aged 85) Harrisonburg, Virginia, U.S.
- Spouse: Edith J. Carrier
- Education: East Tennessee State University; Romanian-American University (Honorary Doctorate); The College of William and Mary (Honorary Doctorate); Jacksonville State University (Honorary Doctorate); Bridgewater College (Honorary Doctorate); Francis Marion College (Honorary Doctorate)
- Website: JMU Biography

Ronald E. Carrier (August 18, 1932 – September 18, 2017) was the fourth President of James Madison University (JMU), having served from 1971 to 1998. Carrier presided over JMU as it grew dramatically in size and in reputation. Carrier most recently served as the university's chancellor. Carrier Library on the JMU campus is named for him.

During his time as president Carrier expanded JMU "from a prominently female institution holding 4,000 students to a co-ed university with 14,000 students. Carrier expanded the grounds of JMU more than 100 acres, and he is largely credited with the vision of East Campus, and the resulting expansion of the university to the eastern side of I-81. A total of 40 new buildings were also constructed at a cost of 210 million dollars."

Carrier was affectionately known on campus as "Uncle Ron," a reflection of his connection with students.

Carrier was a graduate of East Tennessee State University and on the faculty of Memphis State University (now the University of Memphis) before going to JMU.

Preceded by G. Tyler Miller	James Madison University President; 1971–1998	Succeeded by Linwood H. Rose
