= David Marchick =

American attorney & academic (born 1966)

17th President of American University
- Incumbent
- Assumed office July 1, 2026
- Preceded by: Jonathan Alger

Personal details
- Education: University of California, San Diego (BA); University of Texas, Austin (MPA); George Washington University (JD)

David Marchick (born 1966) is an American attorney, diplomat and business leader who is the interim president of American University. He worked in both the Biden and the Clinton administrations, was a partner at the law firm Covington & Burling, and a managing director at The Carlyle Group. He is the co-author of two books: The Peaceful Transfer of Power: An Oral History of America's Presidential Transitions (2022) and US National Security and Foreign Direct Investment (2006).

== Early life and education ==
Marchick was born in 1966 and raised in Orinda, California. He attended the College Preparatory School before earning a Bachelor of Arts from the University of California, San Diego in 1988. While at UC San Diego, Marchick was student body president. Marchick later earned a master's degree in public policy at the Lyndon B. Johnson School of Public Affairs at the University of Texas in Austin, and a Juris Doctor from the George Washington University Law School in Washington, D.C.

== Career ==
=== 1990s ===
Marchick began to work for the Clinton Administration in 1993. During President Clinton's first term, Marchick served in the White House and the Office of the United States Trade Representative where he worked on NAFTA and the WTO Agreements. In May 1996, Marchick was appointed by United States Secretary of Commerce Mickey Kantor to deputy assistant secretary for trade development. Marchick later served in two roles at the State Department: Deputy Assistant Secretary for Trade, and Deputy Assistant Secretary for Transportation. In this role, Marchick led negotiations with numerous countries including Argentina, the UK, Poland, and China to expand air passenger and cargo services.

In October 1999, Marchick left the U.S. State Department to join the newly formed Bid4Assets, a website for bankrupt businesses to auction off their assets.

=== 2000s ===
In March 2002, Marchick joined Covington & Burling, an international law firm where he worked on national security and international trade issues. Marchick was a partner in the firm and served as vice chair of Covington & Burling's international practice. His law practice also focused on representing companies, such as IBM, seeking approval from the Committee on Foreign Investment in the United States (CFIUS), an inter-agency committee of the United States Government that reviews the national security implications of foreign investments in U.S. companies or operations.

In 2006, Marchick co-authored the book U.S. National Security and Foreign Direct Investment.

In October 2007, Marchick joined The Carlyle Group, a Washington, D.C.–based global asset management firm specializing in private equity, as managing director. Marchick served as a member of Carlyle's Management Committee. In these roles, Marchick led Carlyle's regulatory and government affairs, communications and branding, events, research, and sustainability functions, and had broad responsibility for engaging with Carlyle's investors. He was a part of the core team to take Carlyle public in 2012. In support of his work on domestic manufacturing investments, Marchick was awarded the "Solidarity and Appreciation Award" by the United Steelworkers.

Marchick retired from the Carlyle Group in December 2018.

After retiring from Carlyle, Marchick transitioned to non-profit and service oriented roles. He was Director of the Center for Presidential Transition at the Partnership for Public Service and an adjunct professor at the Tuck School of Business at Dartmouth.

As Director of the Center for Presidential Transition, he worked on a non-partisan basis on the Presidential Transition of 2020.

He worked with Senator Ted Kaufman to help architect the Biden transition team’s strategy, priorities and organization, including the “unconventional challenges” associated with the Trump White House’s breaking traditional norms in transitions. Marchick also coordinated interagency briefings on transition planning. Marchick became the “central back channel” with Trump White House Deputy Chief of Staff Chris Liddell to ensure as smooth a transition as possible in the Executive Branch. Marchick hosted the “Transition Lab” podcast, which analyzed the history of every modern presidential transition, plus the most consequential transitions (Lincoln, FDR). That podcast formed the basis of his book The Peaceful Transfer of Power: An Oral History of America's Presidential Transitions, which featured historian and filmmaker Ken Burns’s forward.

As Chief Operating Officer of the U.S. International Development Finance Corporation, Marchick was the senior Biden appointee at the agency.

From August 2022 to June 2026 he served as the dean of the Kogod School of Business at American University. At Kogod, Marchick focused on preparing students for the AI economy and infusing AI into the curriculum, in an effort that Times Higher Education's Poets&Quants recognized as “the most consequential AI transformation in business education”. The Kogod school, under Marchick's leadership, also prioritized sustainability and entrepreneurship leading to national awards for best sustainability curriculum and improved rankings.

He received UCSD's Illustrious Alumni Award in 2026 along with Sian Beilock, the President of Dartmouth College and Aryeh Bourkoff, Founder of Lion Tree Investments.

In May 2026, Marchick was unanimously selected to serve as interim president of American University. He will return to his position as dean of Kogod School of Business once the next president is in place.
