= John J. Miller (Virginia politician) =

American politician (1849–1923)

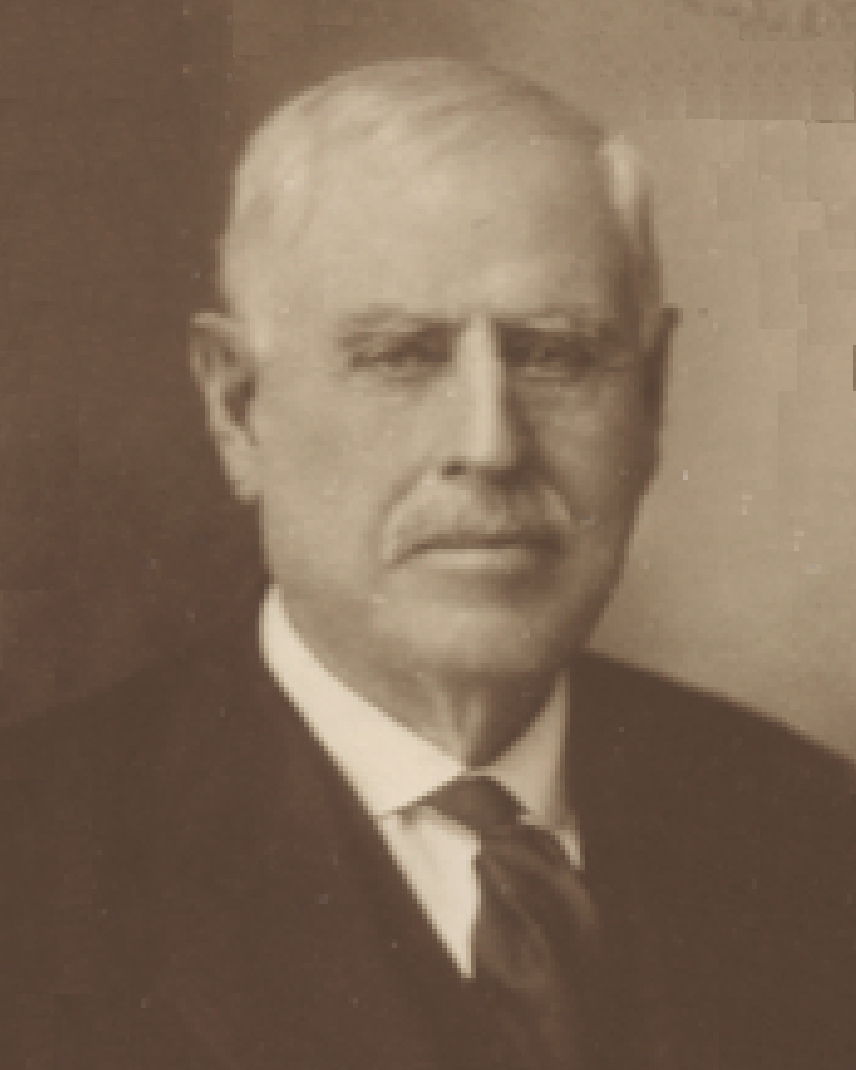
- Official portrait, 1920

Member of the Virginia Senate from the 15th district
- In office January 14, 1920 – June 22, 1923
- Preceded by: Clyde T. Bowers
- Succeeded by: Benjamin F. Buchanan

Member of the Virginia House of Delegates for Page and Rappahannock
- In office January 9, 1918 – January 14, 1920
- Preceded by: Robert F. Leedy
- Succeeded by: Charles Green

Personal details
- Born: John James Miller; August 26, 1849 Washington, Virginia, U.S.
- Died: June 22, 1923 (aged 73) Washington, D.C., U.S.
- Party: Democratic
- Spouses: Susan Watson Taylor; Evelyn May Tyler
- Children: 11, including G. Tyler
- Education: University of Virginia

John James Miller (August 26, 1849 – June 22, 1923) was an American politician who served in both houses of the Virginia General Assembly.

Virginia House of Delegates
Preceded by Robert F. Leedy	Member of the Virginia House of Delegates for Page and Rappahannock; 1918–1920	Succeeded by Charles Green
Senate of Virginia
Preceded by Clyde T. Bowers	Member of the Virginia Senate from the 15th district 1920–1923	Succeeded by Benjamin F. Buchanan
