= G. Tyler Miller =

American educator (1902–1988)

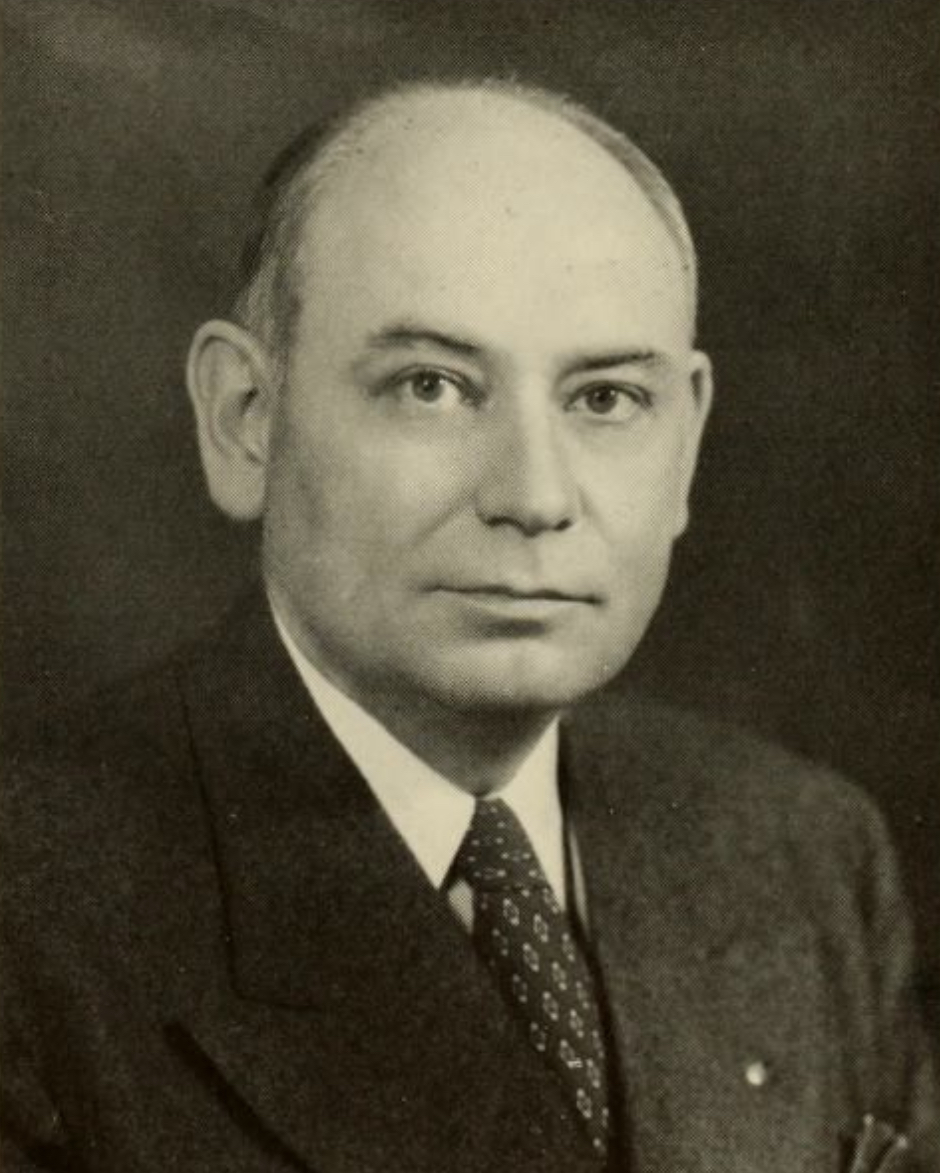
- Portrait of Miller, 1950

3rd President of James Madison University
- In office September 3, 1949 – December 31, 1970
- Preceded by: Samuel Page Duke
- Succeeded by: Ronald E. Carrier

11th Virginia Superintendent of Public Instruction
- In office June 15, 1946 – August 31, 1949
- Governor: William M. Tuck
- Preceded by: Dabney S. Lancaster
- Succeeded by: Dowell J. Howard

Personal details
- Born: George Tyler Miller; July 25, 1902 Washington, Virginia, U.S.
- Died: July 24, 1988 (aged 85) Lynchburg, Virginia, U.S.
- Spouses: Kathryn Gray Weaver (m. 1929; died 1935); Elise Reaguer (m. 1947; died 1956); Elizabeth Thaxton Mauzy (m. 1968; died 1988)
- Parent: John J. Miller (father)
- Education: Virginia Military Institute
- Occupation: Educator

George Tyler Miller (July 25, 1902 – July 24, 1988) was the third president of Madison College (now James Madison University), serving from 1949 to 1971. He was previously Virginia Superintendent of Public Instruction under Governor William M. Tuck. Miller Hall on JMU's campus is named for him. He died in 1988 in Lynchburg.

Government offices
Preceded by Dabney S. Lancaster	Virginia Superintendent of Public Instruction; 1946–1949	Succeeded by Dowell J. Howard
Academic offices
Preceded by Samuel Page Duke	President of Madison College; 1949–1971	Succeeded by Ronald E. Carrier
