= The Breeze (newspaper) =

Student-run newspaper of James Madison University

- Type: Student newspaper
- Format: Tabloid
- Staff writers: >50
- Founded: 1922
- Language: English
- Headquarters: Harrisonburg, Virginia
- Circulation: 5,000
- Website: breezejmu.org

The Breeze is the official student-run newspaper of James Madison University in Harrisonburg, Virginia. The Breeze publishes 5,000 copies every Thursday. The Breeze publishes local news during the academic year. It is made up of four sections: news, culture, sports and opinion. The Breeze is also known to many JMU alumni and current students for its long-standing tradition of publishing Darts & Pats.

== History ==
The Breeze started as a four-column, four-page weekly publication on December 22, 1922, with few illustrations and fewer photos. Today, it is a 20-plus-page broadsheet newspaper published weekly with full-color photos and graphics. The paper was originally distributed to women on the way out of the dining hall, but currently is distributed to more than 100 locations on James Madison campus and throughout the Harrisonburg community.

=== Origins of the name ===
In 1922, the newly established newspaper for the State Normal School for Women held a contest for suggestions on what to name the new publication. English teacher Elizabeth P. Cleveland suggested the name “The Breeze,” saying that “nothing here strikes a stranger quite so strongly as our mountain breeze. It is both inspiring and stimulating. It is full of pep, but clean. It clears the cobwebs from the brain and sweeps morbidness from the heart.”

“The Breeze” won the contest, barely beating out “The Campus Cat” by a coin toss. Cleveland was awarded $2 for her entry.

=== Advertising team ===
The Breeze established an advertising team in 1922, when the paper began operation.

== Distribution ==
Along with a physical and virtual copy of the newspaper, The Breeze also ventured into TV in 2017. This section of The Breeze covers news, interviews with students and community members, politics, culture, and sports. The news videos can be accessed through their website and YouTube.

== Notable alumni ==
- Jeff Gammage ('82), a Pulitzer Prize-winning journalist at the Philadelphia Inquirer.
- Bob Leberone ('79), a Pulitzer Prize-winning photographer at The Charlotte Observer.

== See also ==
- List of college and university student newspapers in the United States
