= Duke Dog =

College sports mascot

- University: James Madison University
- Conference: Sun Belt
- Description: Royal Bulldog
- Origin of name: President Samuel Page Duke
- First seen: 1982

Duke Dog is the official mascot for the James Madison University Dukes. "Dukes" was made the official nickname in 1947, and was named after the University's president from 1919 to 1949, Samuel Page Duke. However, the bulldog was not chosen to represent the Dukes until the 1972–1973 school year. The name "Duke" was a reference to British Royalty, so having the stereotypical British pet as the mascot made sense. After a decade of the original costume, Dr. Ray V. Sonner revamped the appearance of Duke Dog in the 1982–83 school year. On November 28, 1982, Duke Dog appeared in JMU's first home game of the men's basketball season against the Virginia Military Institute. Duke Dog's physical appearance has stayed roughly the same since its debut in 1982, being a gray, anthropomorphic English bulldog standing around eight-feet-tall wearing a purple cape and a purple and gold crown atop its head.

In 2004, Duke Dog was named a finalist for the Capital One Mascot Bowl. After eleven weeks of voting, Duke Dog won its matchup each week to finish a perfect 11–0. The next closest mascot finished with a record of 6–5. Although Duke Dog overwhelmingly won in polling, the contest was based also on scores from a panel of judges, and Monte from the University of Montana ended up winning the contest overall (ironically, JMU had just defeated Montana in the I-AA football championship less than a month earlier). Since this incident, Capital One has changed the contest so that the popular vote is the sole determinant of the winner of the Mascot Bowl.

On September 22, 2007, Duke Dog was tackled by Chanticleer, a chicken mascot from Coastal Carolina University. A fight between the mascots ensued, and Duke Dog inadvertently struck one of the police officers who was trying to end the confrontation.
