= Linwood H. Rose =

American university president

Dr. Linwood H. Rose
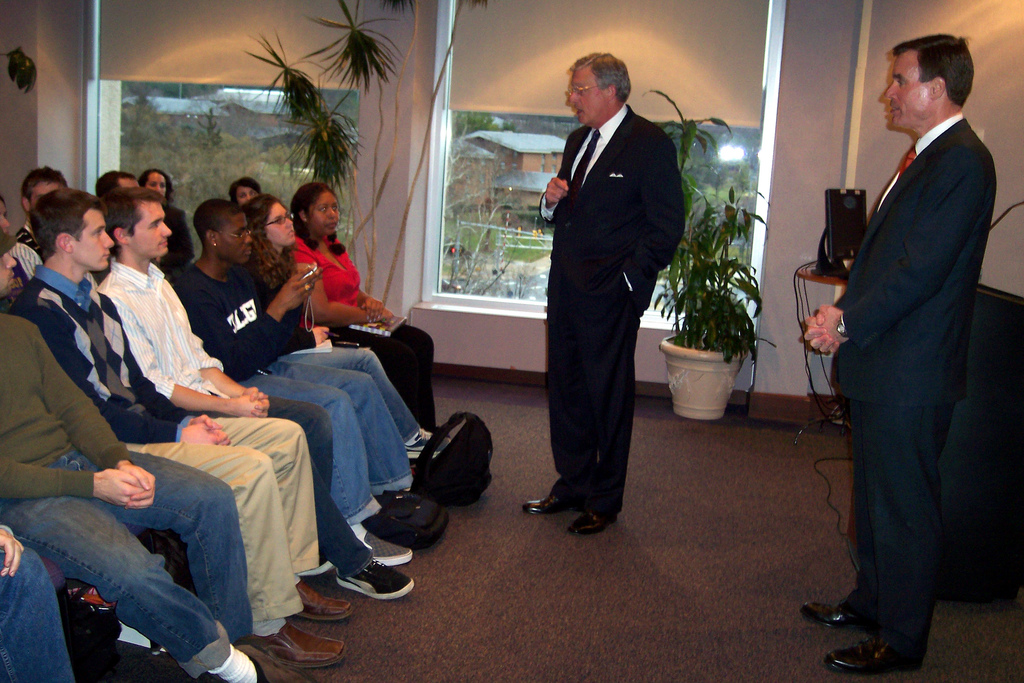
- Linwood H. Rose introducing Virginia governor Mark Warner at a meeting of JMU College Democrats

5th President of James Madison University
- In office September 1997 – July 2012
- Preceded by: Ronald E. Carrier
- Succeeded by: Jonathan R. Alger

Personal details
- Born: 1951 (age 73–74); Daytona Beach, Florida, U.S.
- Education: Virginia Tech (BA); University of Tennessee (Master's degree); University of Virginia (Doctorate)
- Website: JMU Biography

Linwood Howard Rose (born 1951) was the fifth president of James Madison University in Harrisonburg, VA. Rose held 11 other positions at JMU before being named acting president in the fall of 1997, chief executive in September 1998, and being formally inaugurated on September 17, 1999.

He has also served as the Deputy Secretary of Education in Virginia and was appointed by President George W. Bush to the National Infrastructure Advisory Committee in 2002. This was followed by an appointment from Virginia Governor, Bob McDonnell to the Governor's Commission on Higher Education Reform, Innovation and Investment

Rose announced in December 2010 that he planned to end his presidency in June 2012. He was replaced by Jonathan R. Alger of Rutgers University.

== Early life ==
Rose was born in Daytona Beach, Florida and raised in Staunton, Virginia. He earned his bachelor's degree in economics from Virginia Tech, his master's degree in educational administration and supervision from the University of Tennessee, and his doctorate in higher education administration from the University of Virginia.

Preceded by Ronald E. Carrier	James Madison University President; 1998–2012	Succeeded by Jonathan R. Alger
