= James Madison University =

Public university in Harrisonburg, Virginia, US

Coordinates: 38°26′18.4″N 78°52′25.5″W

- Former name: List: State Normal and Industrial School (1908–1914) State Normal School for Women at Harrisonburg (1914–1924) State Teachers College at Harrisonburg (1924–1938) Madison College (1938–1977)
- Motto: "Knowledge is Liberty"
- Type: Public research university
- Established: February 29, 1908; 118 years ago
- Accreditation: SACS
- Academic affiliations: SCHEV
- Endowment: $181 million (2025)
- Budget: $825 million (2025)
- President: James C. Schmidt
- Faculty: 1,463 (2022)
- Students: 22,224 (2022)
- Undergraduates: 20,346 (2022)
- Postgraduates: 1,878 (2022)
- Location: Harrisonburg, Virginia, United States
- Campus: 785 acres (3.18 km^{2}); Small city
- Other campuses: Antwerp; Florence; London; Washington, D.C.
- Newspaper: The Breeze
- Colors: Purple and gold
- Nickname: Dukes
- Sporting affiliations: NCAA Division I FBS – Sun Belt; MAC; The American
- Mascot: Duke Dog
- Website: jmu.edu

James Madison University (JMU, Madison, or James Madison) is a public research university in Harrisonburg, Virginia, United States. Founded in 1908, the institution was renamed in 1938 in honor of the fourth president of the United States, James Madison. It has since expanded from its origins as a normal school and teacher's college into a comprehensive university. It is situated in the Shenandoah Valley, just west of Massanutten Mountain.

== History ==
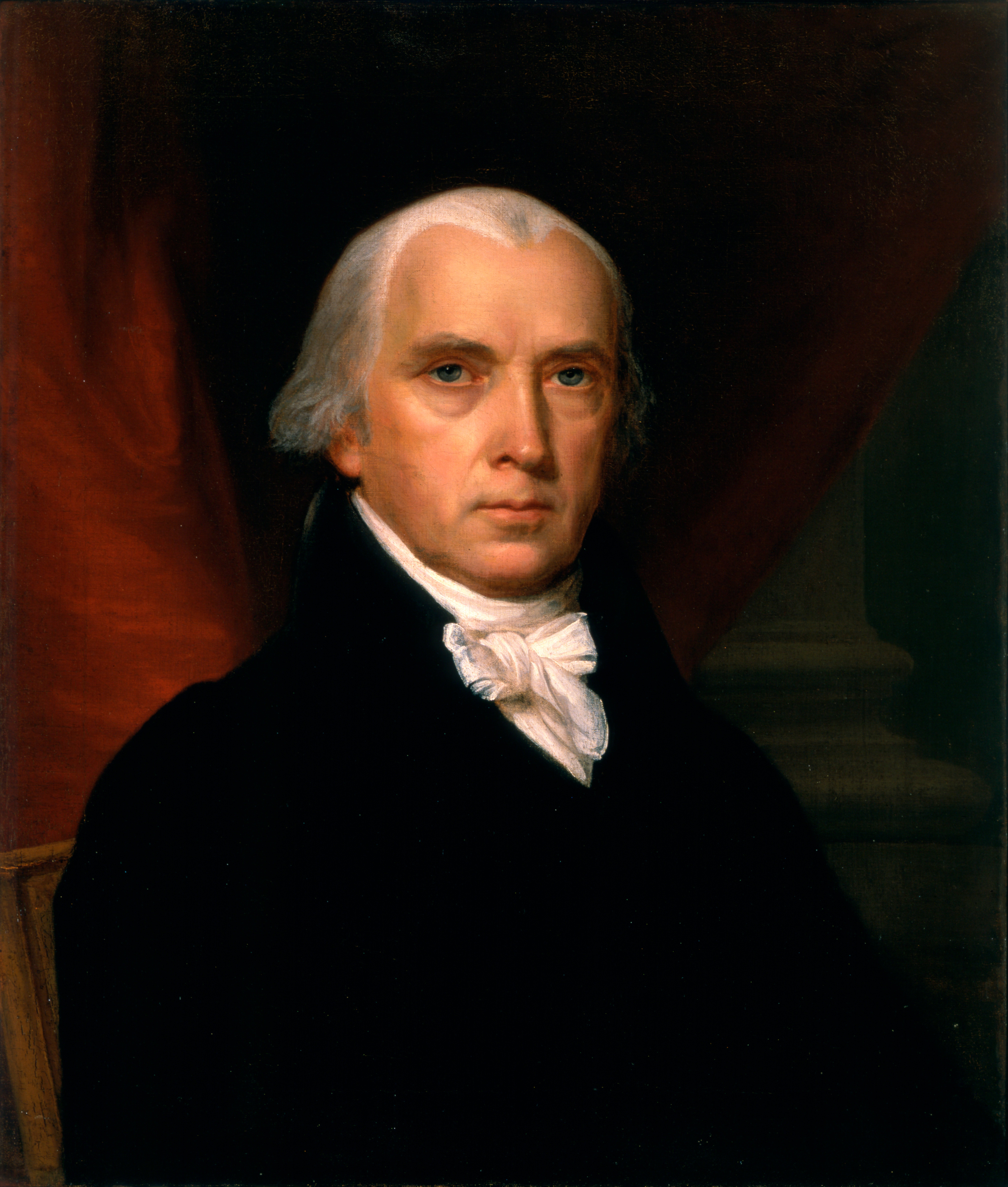
James Madison, the university's namesake, by John Vanderlyn (1816)

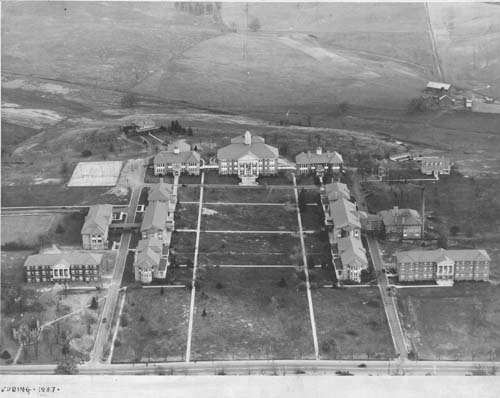
Aerial view of campus from 1937, showing the original campus plan, prior to major expansions of the campus.

Founded in 1908 as a women's college, James Madison University was established by the Virginia General Assembly. It was originally called The State Normal and Industrial School for Women at Harrisonburg. In 1914, the name of the university was changed to the State Normal School for Women at Harrisonburg. Authorization to award bachelor's degrees was granted in 1916. During this initial period of development, six buildings were constructed.

The university became the State Teachers College at Harrisonburg in 1924 and continued under that name until 1938 when it was named Madison College in honor of James Madison, the fourth President of the United States, whose Montpelier estate is located in nearby Orange, Virginia. In 1977, the university's name was changed to James Madison University.

The first president of the university was Julian Ashby Burruss. The university opened its doors in 1909 with an enrollment of 209 students and a faculty of fifteen. Its first twenty graduates received diplomas in 1911.

In 1919, Burruss resigned the presidency to become president of Virginia Polytechnic Institute. Samuel Page Duke was then chosen as the school's second president. During Duke's administration, nine major buildings were constructed. Duke served as president from 1919 to 1949.

In 1946, men were first enrolled as regular day students. G. Tyler Miller became the third president in 1949, following Duke's retirement. During Miller's administration, from 1949 to 1970, the campus was enlarged by 240 acres (0.97 km^{2}) and 19 buildings were constructed. Major curriculum changes were made and the university was authorized to grant master's degrees in 1954.

In 1966, by the action of the Virginia General Assembly, the university became a coeducational institution. Ronald E. Carrier, JMU's fourth president, headed the school from 1971 to 1998, and is the namesake of Carrier Library. After undergoing construction starting in May 2023, culminating in complete renovation and expansion of the building, Carrier Library reopened in August of 2026.

=== 21st century ===
During the first decade of the 21st century under Linwood H. Rose (JMU's fifth president), the university continued to expand, not only through new construction east of Interstate 81 but also on the west side of campus. In early 2005, JMU purchased the Rockingham Memorial Hospital campus just north of the main JMU campus for over $40 million. The hospital has since moved and JMU now occupies the site. In June 2005, the university expanded across South High Street by leasing, and then purchasing, the former Harrisonburg High School building.

The rapid expansion of JMU's campus has at times created tension in the city-university relationship. In 2006, the local ABC affiliate reported that the university had nearly doubled in size in the preceding 20 years, including purchases of several local properties.

The university has also experienced tension with local residents and local police when 2,500 students at an off-campus block party grew unruly in 2000. Ten years later, police equipped with riot gear used force to disperse a group of 8,000 college-aged people at a similar party. Several participants were airlifted to a medical center in Charlottesville for treatment. The university condemned the block party attendees' behavior.

In August 2021, the university received national criticism from conservative political commentators and university alumni after a freshman orientation leader training video and other publications surfaced that labeled white Americans and Christians as oppressors. In a statement to Fox News, the university stood by the training.

In March 2025, it was announced that James C. Schmidt would become the seventh president, who was scheduled to take office in July 2025.

== Campus ==
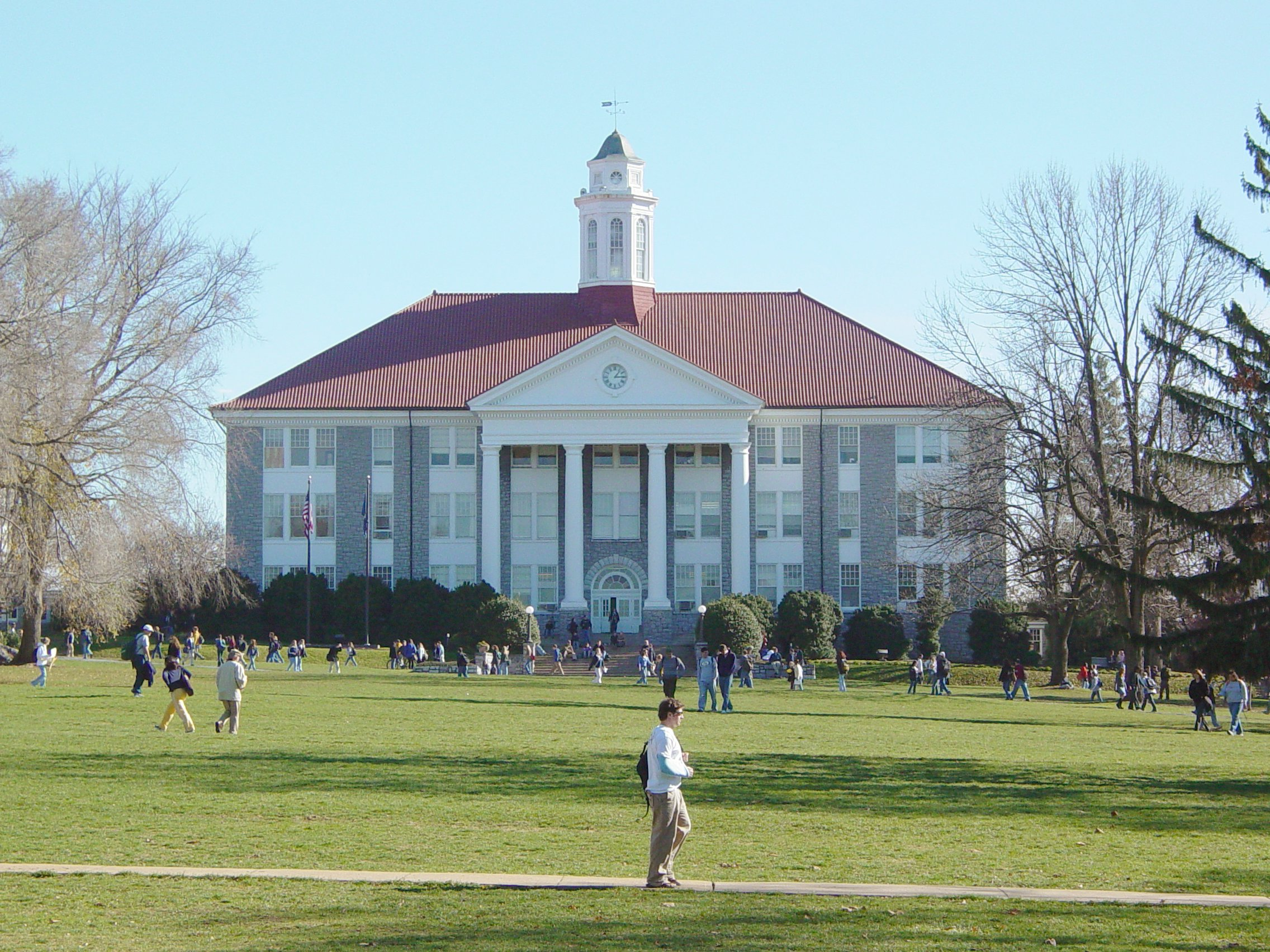
Woodrow Wilson Hall, the centerpiece of the JMU quadrangle

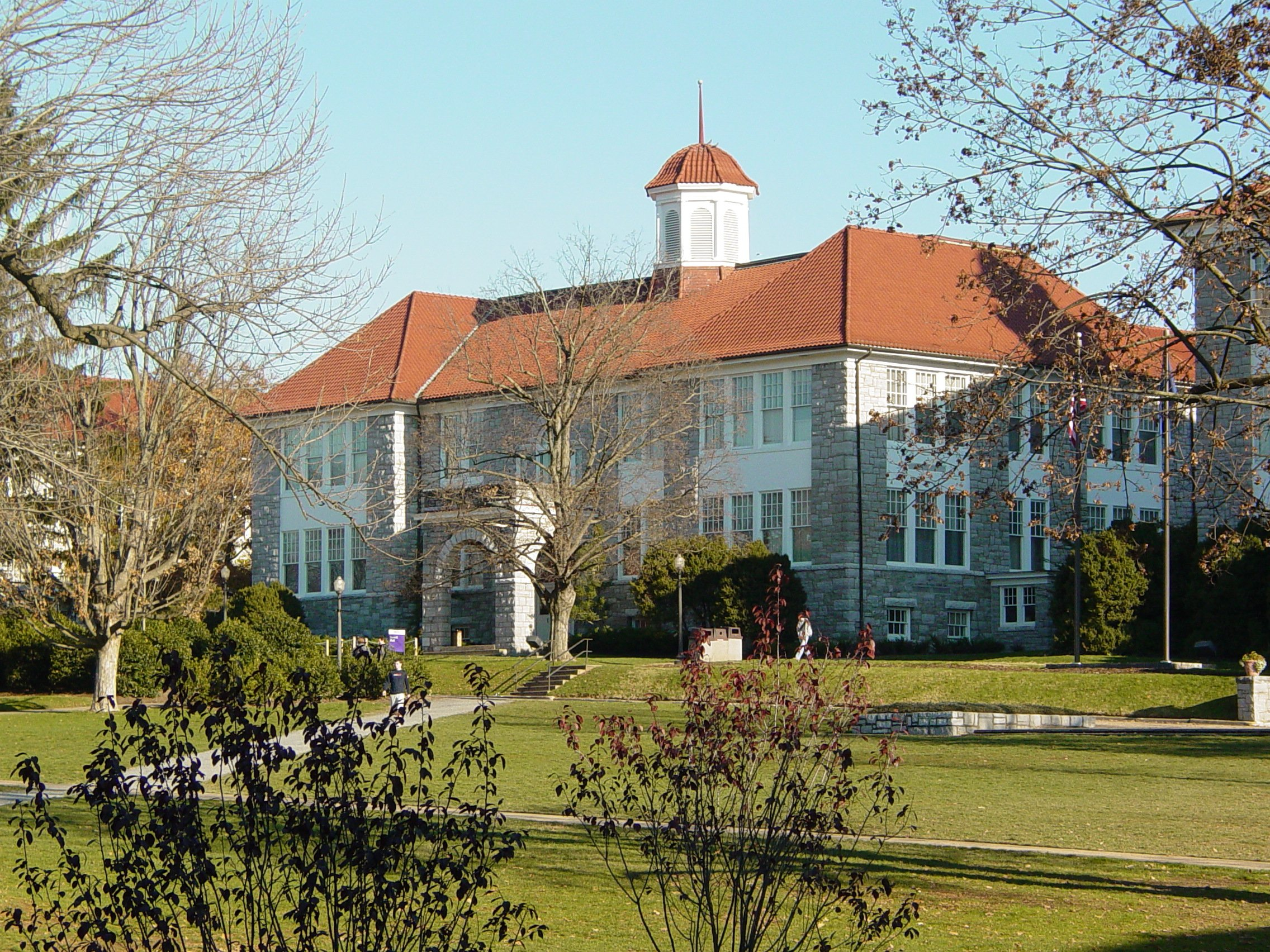
Keezell Hall, home of the university's English and Foreign Language departments

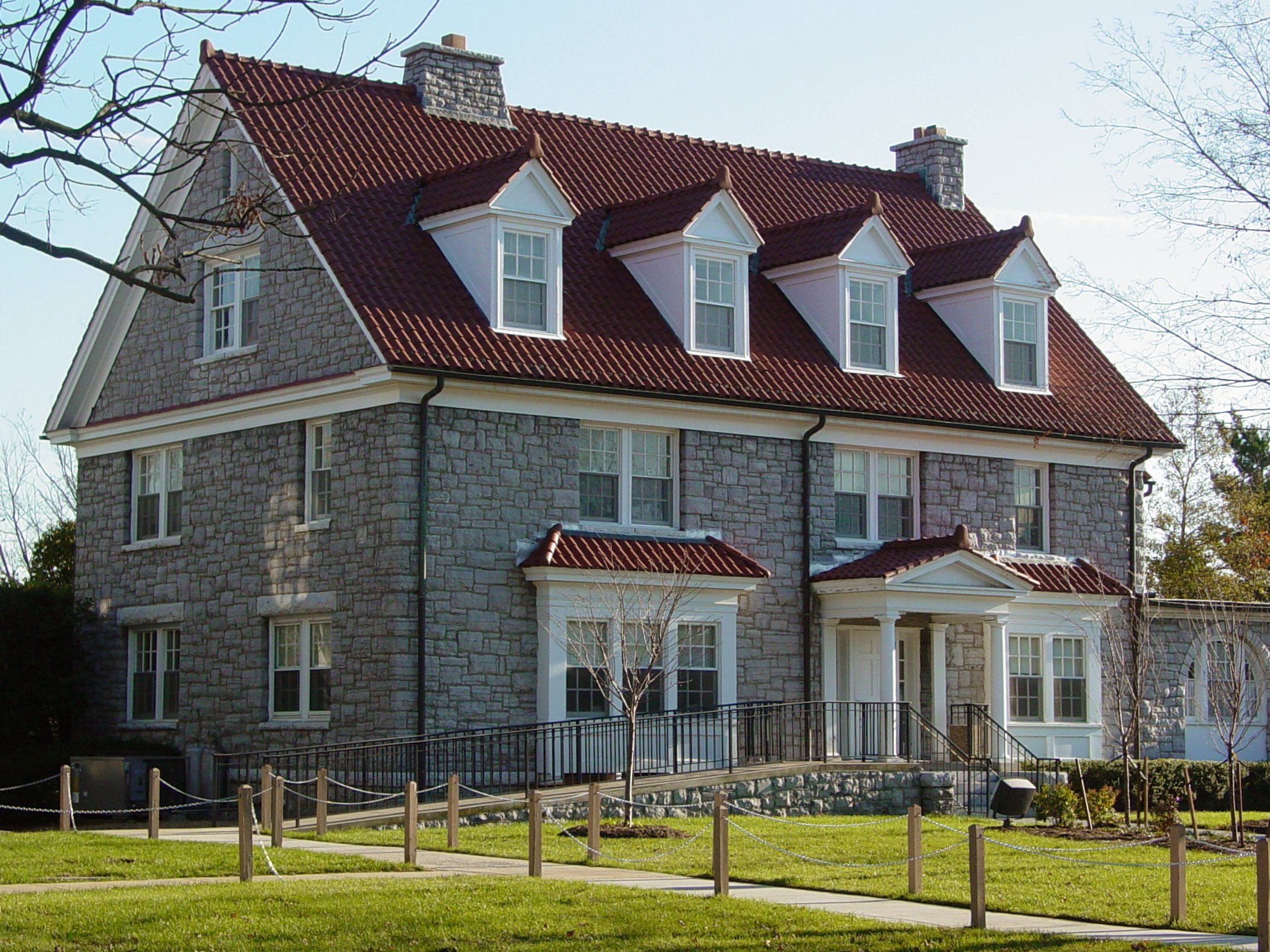
Varner House, formerly the practice house for students studying housekeeping, now hosts administrative offices

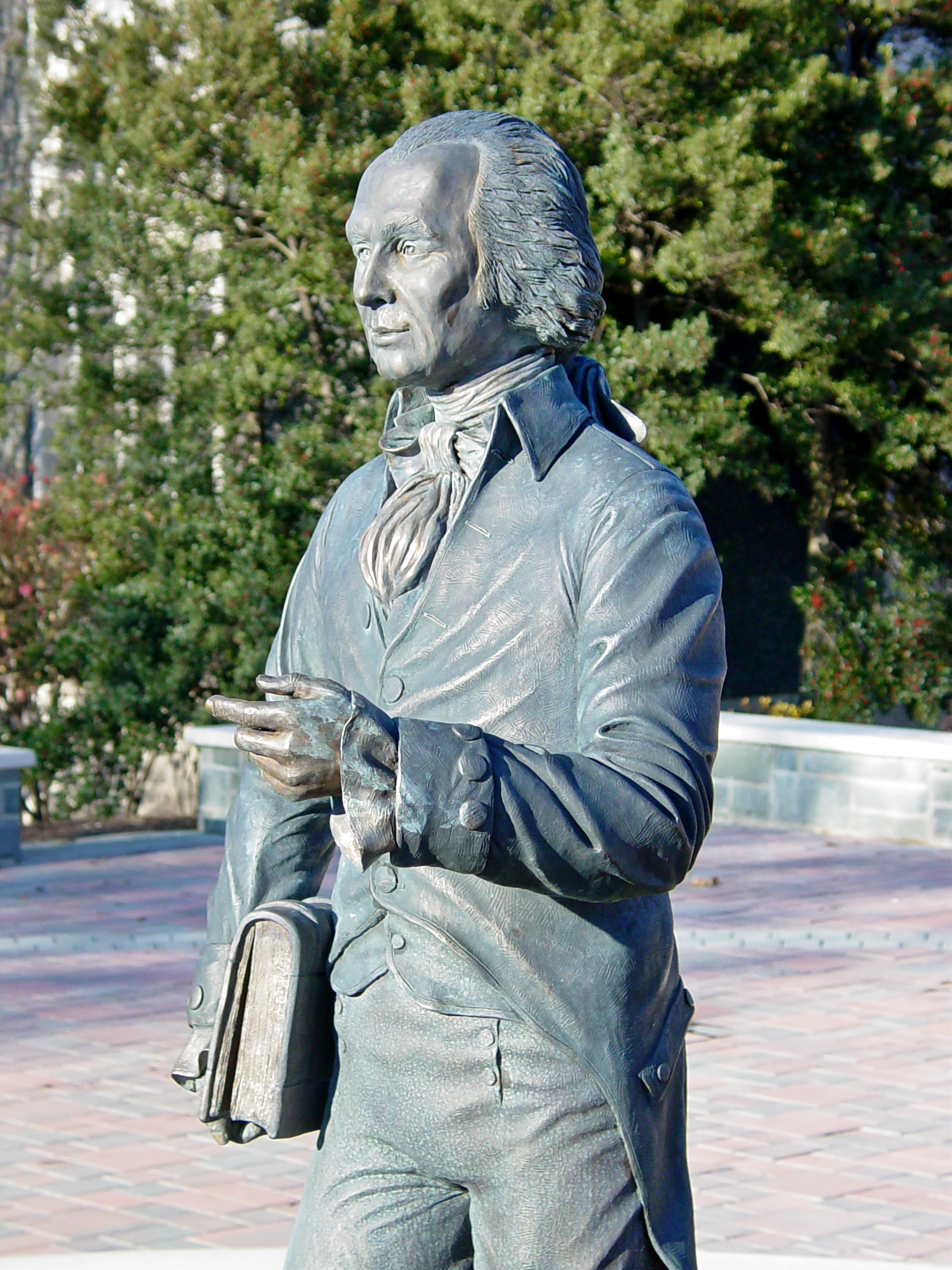
A statue of Virginia native James Madison, a Founding Father and the fourth President of the United States

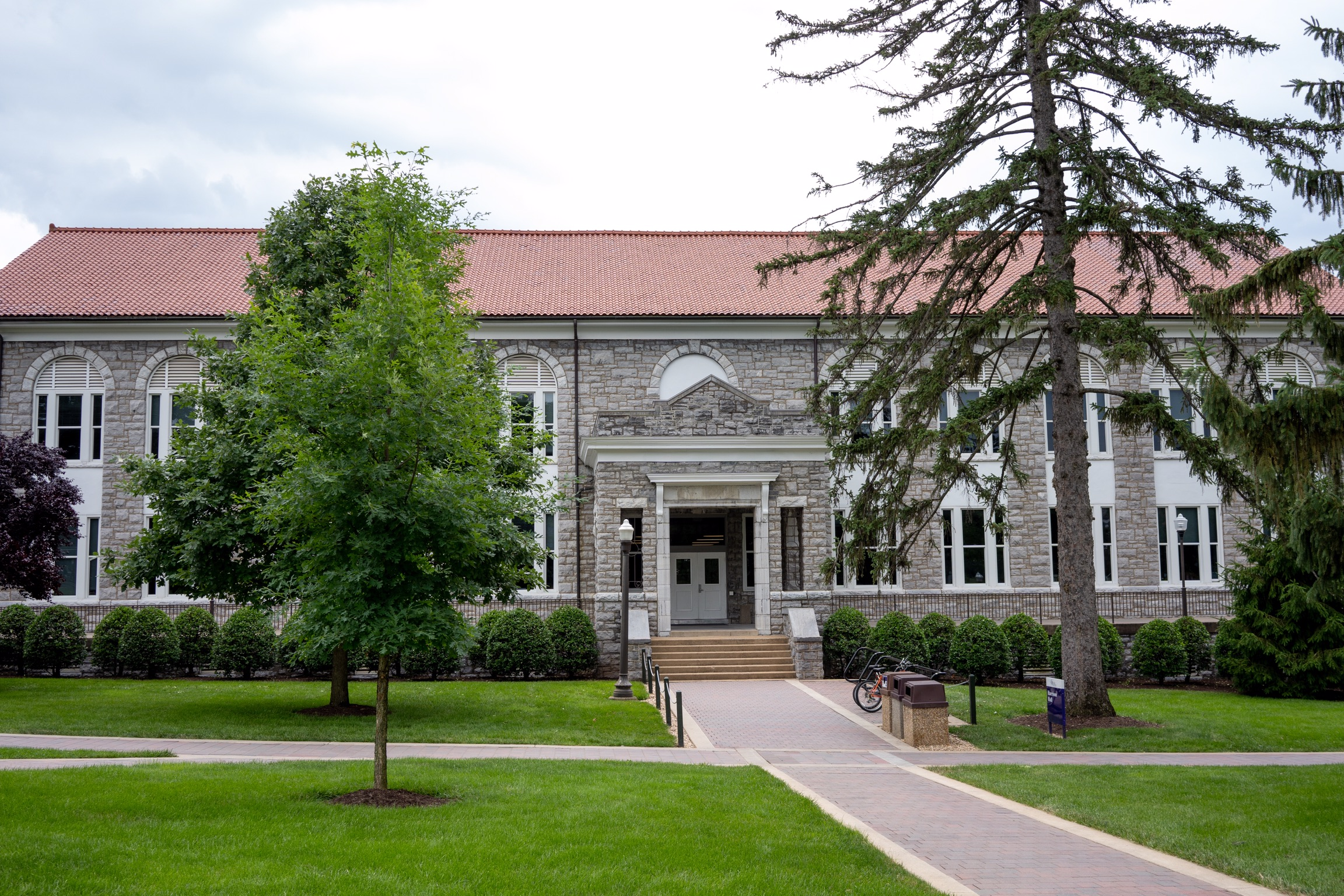
Harrison Hall, home of the university's Writing, Communication, and Media Arts & Design departments

JMU's campus originally consisted of two buildings, Jackson Hall and Maury Hall, which are now known as Darcus Johnson Hall and Gabbin Hall, respectively. Today, the campus has 148 major buildings on 721 acres (2.92 km^{2}). It has become Virginia's second most photographed location on social media sites like Instagram and Twitter.

The original, historic Bluestone side of campus is located on South Main Street (also known as U.S. Route 11, and historically as "The Valley Pike") and is the heart of the university. Many of the buildings in the Bluestone area have been constructed out of the same stone, known as "bluestone," which is a type of limestone that is locally sourced from the surrounding Shenandoah Valley.

Beginning in 2002, JMU began receiving state and private funding to construct a performing arts complex. In 2010, the Forbes Center for the Performing Arts opened, comprising venues for theatre and dance, as well as for musical performance. The facility is opposite Wilson Hall across South Main Street.

JMU Dining won #3 for Best Campus Food by the Princeton Review in 2026.

=== Renaming historic halls ===
In 2020, JMU's Board of Visitors approved the renaming of three historic buildings on the quad that were named in honor of three prominent Virginian Confederate soldiers: Ashby Hall (named after Turner Ashby), Maury Hall (named after Matthew Fontaine Maury), and Jackson Hall (named after Stonewall Jackson). They were given the temporary names of Valley Hall, Mountain Hall, and Justice Studies Hall, respectively. In 2021, the halls were approved and given new names. Mountain Hall (Maury Hall) was renamed Gabbin Hall after Drs. Joanne V. and Alexander Gabbin, professors at JMU for more than 35 years; Valley Hall (Ashby Hall) was renamed Harper Allen-Lee Hall after Doris Harper Allen and Robert Walker Lee, both notable former staff members at JMU; Justice Studies Hall (Jackson Hall) was renamed Darcus Johnson Hall after Sheary Darcus Johnson, the first black student to graduate from JMU.

In late 2021, the ISAT/CS building was renamed King Hall in honor of Charles W. King; longtime Senior Vice President of the Administration and Finance Division at JMU.

== Organization and administration ==
=== Colleges ===
The College of Visual and Performing Arts includes three schools: the School of Art, Design, and Art History; the School of Music; and the School of Theatre and Dance.

In September 2010, the college opened the Forbes Center for the Performing Arts, a complex composed of two connected buildings: the Estes Center for Theatre and Dance and the Roberts Center for Music Performance. The $82 million facility was funded by a Virginia higher-education bond package.

=== Board of Visitors ===
Like all public universities in Virginia, James Madison is governed by a Board of Visitors appointed by the Governor of Virginia. In addition to the 15 members appointed by the governor, the speaker of the Faculty Senate and an elected student represent the faculty and the student body respectively. The appointed members serve for a maximum of two consecutive four-year terms, while the student representative is limited to two one-year terms. The faculty representative serves while remaining the speaker of the JMU Faculty Senate. Some appointed members of note include former presidential candidate Carly Fiorina and former first lady of Virginia, Susan Allen.

==== Presidents ====
- Julian Ashby Burruss (1908–1919)
- Samuel Page Duke (1919–1949)
- G. Tyler Miller (1949–1971)
- Ronald E. Carrier (1971–1998)
- Linwood H. Rose (1999–2012)
- Jonathan R. Alger (2012–2024)
- James C. Schmidt (2025–present)

== Academics ==
James Madison University is classified among "R2: Doctoral Universities – High Research Activity". It offers 139-degree programs on the bachelor's, master's, educational specialist, and doctoral levels. It comprises seven colleges and 78 academic programs, including the College of Arts and Letters; the College of Business; the College of Education; the College of Health and Behavioral Studies; the College of Integrated Science and Engineering; the College of Science and Mathematics; the College of Visual and Performing Arts; and The Graduate School. Total enrollment in the 2012–13 academic year was 19,927—18,392 undergraduates and 1,820 graduate students. JMU granted 4,908 degrees in 2012–4,096 undergraduate degrees, and 812 graduate degrees.

On October 2, 2009, JMU was granted a chapter by the Phi Beta Kappa academic honor society.

=== Reputation and rankings ===
Academic rankings

National
- Forbes: 136
- U.S. News & World Report: 137
- Washington Monthly: 75
- WSJ/College Pulse: 152

The 2024 U.S. News & World Report ranked JMU No. 124 among national universities. In the 2018 Washington Monthly college rankings, JMU ranked eighth among master's universities nationwide. Washington Monthly assesses the quality of schools based on social mobility (recruiting and graduating low-income students), research, and service.

== Student life ==
Student body composition as of Fall 2023
Race and ethnicity	Total
White	75%
Hispanic	8%
Asian	5%
Two or more races	5%
Black	4%
Unknown	2%
International student	1%
Economic diversity
Low-income (Note: The percentage of students who received an income-based federal Pell grant intended for low-income students.)	16%
Affluent (Note: The percentage of students who are a part of the American middle class at the bare minimum.)	84%

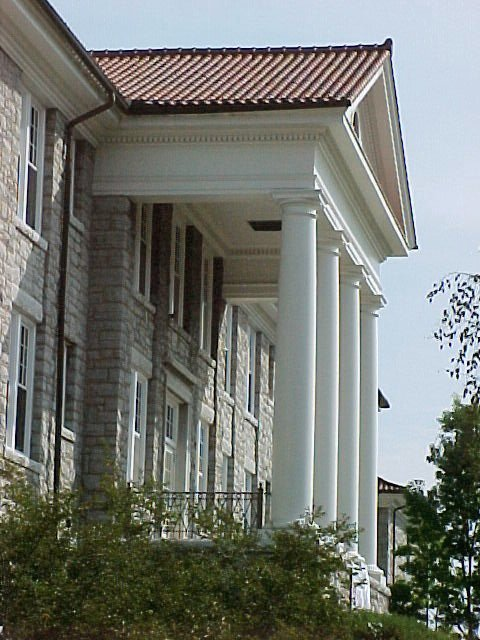
Converse Hall

The Princeton Review recognized James Madison as one of 81 schools in America "with a conscience", and in 2006 ranked JMU second in the nation behind only the University of Virginia in the number of Peace Corps volunteers it sent from its student body among "medium-sized" universities. And in 2010, the food at JMU was ranked third in the United States. In 2011 the student body was ranked 20th "happiest in the entire nation" by Newsweek and The Daily Beast. These rankings take into consideration the surrounding area's activities, academics, as well as the social scene on campus.

=== The Breeze ===
The Breeze is a student-run weekly newspaper serving JMU since 1922. The six person staff published the first issue on December 2, containing four pages. The Breeze has won numerous awards, including a 2012 Online Pacemaker Award, 2012 VPA award for Best in Show for a Non-Daily News Presentation, and a 2012 VPA sweepstakes award.

=== The Bluestone ===
The Bluestone is the university's oldest publication, beginning in 1910 as the Schoolma'am. In 1962, the name changed to The Bluestone. The staff consists of an editorial board and staff members, both receive payment for their work. There are five editorial board positions, Editor-in-Chief, Design Editor, Photography Editor, Copy Editor, and Staff Manager. Staff Members have the option to contribute through photography, writing, or design. The publication is distributed free of charge to students at distribution sites. In 2021, The Bluestone was recognized by the Associated Collegiate Press on their top 100 Pacemaker awards list at MediaFest22.

=== Clubs and organizations ===
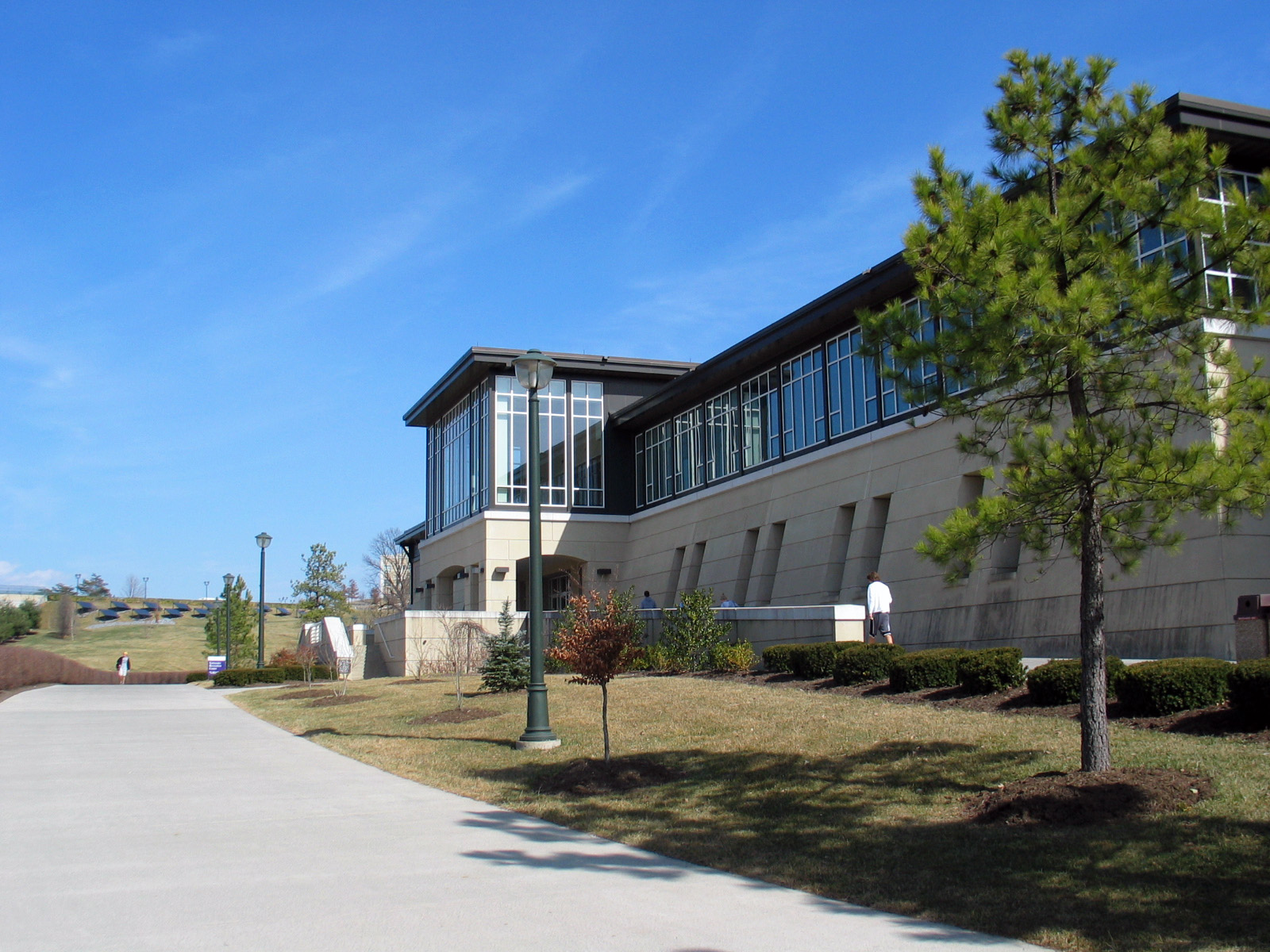
The university's main gym and athletic center is the University Recreation Center (UREC)

James Madison University has over 400 clubs and organizations for students.

There are 10 front-end budgeted groups on campus, including the Black Student Alliance (BSA), Inter-Fraternity Council (IFC), Latinx Student Alliance (LSA), Madison Equality, National Association for the Advancement of Colored People (NAACP), Panhellenic, SafeRides, Student Ambassadors (SA), Student Government Association (SGA), and University Program Board (UPB). The funds allocated to these organization are voted on by the SGA, with the exception to the SGA budget which is approved separately by the administration. Some FEB organizations are more active than others, causing debate about their status from year-to-year.

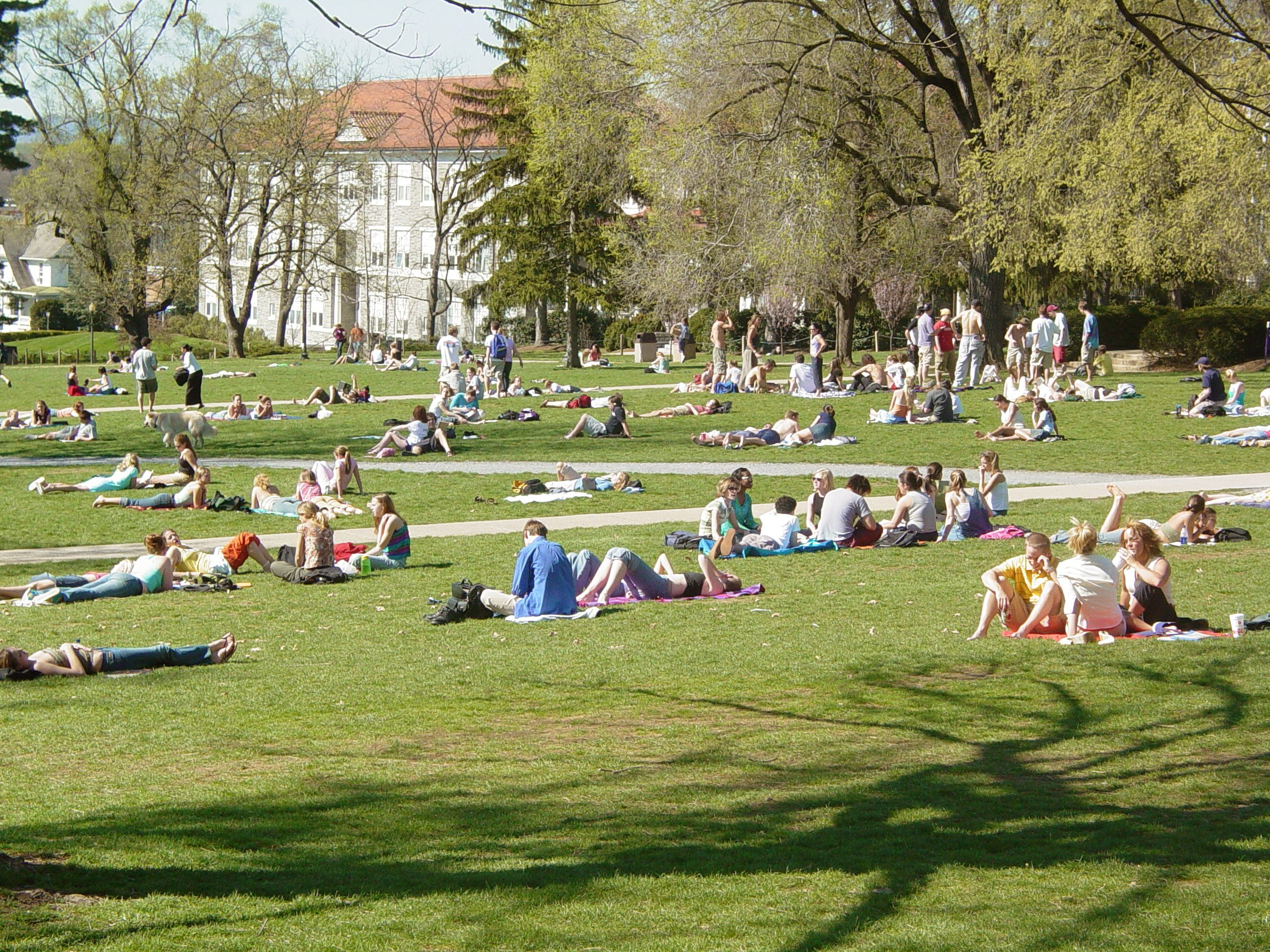
Students on the James Madison University quad (2003)

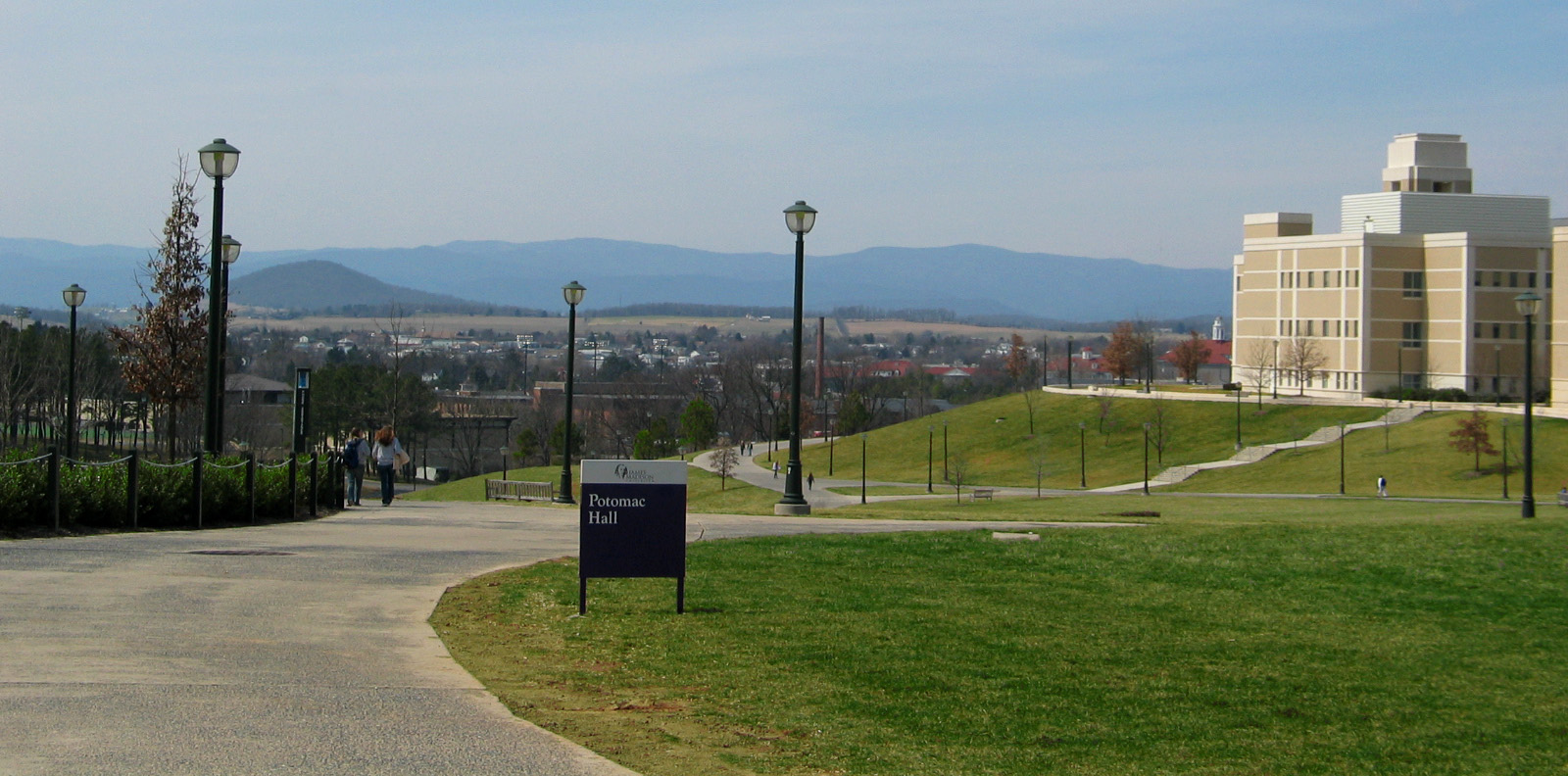
JMU's East Campus overlooks distant mountains

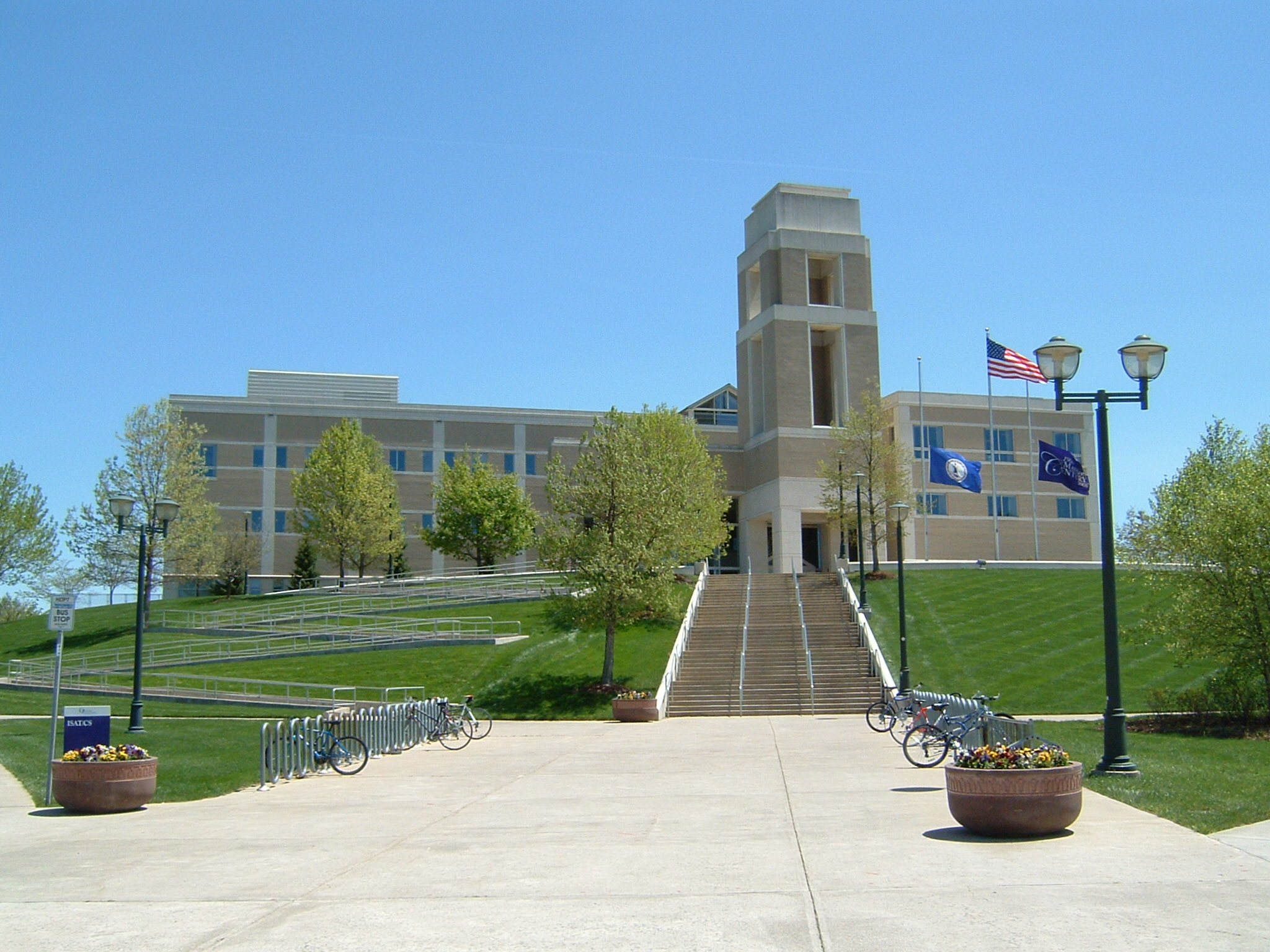
King Hall

SGA has initiated many of the university's traditional events and programs, such as Homecoming's Purple Out, Mr. and Ms. Madison, Ring Premiere, the Annual Tree Lighting, the Big Event, and SafeRides. They also vote on Front End Budgeted (FEB) organizational budgets each year and allocate contingency funds. Founded in 2003, SafeRides originated as a program run by the SGA. Inspired by a program at Texas A&M, the organization is a student-led non-profit: unpaid students drive students home at night at no charge. By 2022, they had given more than 100,000 rides.

The JMU Student Ambassadors work alongside the Admissions Office to offer student-led tours for prospective students. Formerly, the Ambassadors were also associated with the Alumni Office until the GOLD Network was established. Ambassadors are volunteers and are not paid.

=== Greek life ===
James Madison University is home to 20 fraternities and 12 sororities with an active membership of over 4,800 students. Greek life at JMU is organized under three governing councils: the Interfraternity Council (IFC), the Panhellenic Council, and the Inter-Cultural Greek Council (ICGC), which represent multicultural and historically Black Greek-letter organizations respectively. Greek life was formally brought to campus in spring of 1939 with the chartering of Sigma Sigma Sigma and Alpha Sigma Alpha. As of 2025, over 20% of the undergraduate population participates in Greek life.

Over the years, there have been JMU Greek chapters that have lost university recognition or faced sanctions due to hazing, alcohol abuse, and other misconduct.

A monument dedicated to the organizations within the Inter-Cultural Greek Council (ICGC) was built in 2022 outside of the university's Student Success Center.

=== Music ===
James Madison University has the largest collegiate marching band in the nation, with 540 members as of Fall 2022. Nicknamed "Virginia's Finest", the Marching Royal Dukes have performed at the inaugurations of Presidents Bill Clinton and George W. Bush, the NFC title game between Washington and Dallas in 1983, and the Bands of America Grand National Championships in 1988 and 1991. The band has made four appearances in the Macy's Thanksgiving Day Parade, first in 2001, again in 2008, 2013, and most recently in 2018. In the past decade, the band has performed in Europe during winter break; they appeared in Athens, Dublin, Monaco, London, and Rome.

The JMU Brass Band is one of only a few collegiate brass bands in the United States. Formed in the fall of 2000, the band has twice been named the North American Brass Band Association (NABBA) Honors Section Champion (2004, 2005), and is the 2024 Championship Section Champion.

JMU is home to ten a cappella ensembles: four all-female, three all-male, and three co-educational groups. They are nationally recognized, with many of them featured on the Best of College A Cappella (BOCA) yearly compilation albums. Several of the groups, such as Note-oriety and The Overtones, have gone "viral" for their music videos, "Pretty Hurts" and "Say Love", respectively. Note-oriety also performed at the White House in 2019.

=== Club sports ===
The JMU men's and women's club soccer teams are two of the most decorated club organizations in JMU school history.

The JMU men's ultimate team, the Flying Hellfish, was founded in 1997. The team is named after the Simpsons episode 22, season 7, "Raging Abe Simpson and His Grumbling Grandson in 'The Curse of the Flying Hellfish'" Since 2005, the team has hosted an annual tournament known as "The Hellfish Bonanza," which attracts between 12 and 16 teams from across the east coast.

The JMU Men's Rugby Club was founded in 1974, making it the first club sport founded at JMU. The Women's Rugby Club was founded two years later. The JMU Men's Rugby Sevens team claimed victory of the Men's Division II title at the 2015 USA Rugby College Sevens National Championship, making it the first time the university's club has done so. The Men's Rugby Club celebrated its 50th anniversary in 2024.

JMU offers a club pickle ball team that requires no tryouts for their social team, but tryouts for their competitive team. For the competitive team dues are between 100$-15$ each semester.

== Athletics ==
James Madison athletics wordmark

James Madison University's athletic teams are known as the Dukes. An English bulldog, with a crown and cape, and Duke Dog, a gray canine costume in a purple cape and crown, serve as the school's mascot. The "Dukes" nickname is in honor of Samuel Page Duke, the university's second president. The school colors are royal purple and gold. Madison competes in the NCAA's Division I in the Sun Belt Conference and the Eastern College Athletic Conference.

Beginning in July 2022, the football program began competing in the NCAA's Football Bowl Subdivision (FBS) as part of the Sun Belt Conference. Before that, the team participated in the Football Championship Subdivision (FCS) and within the Colonial Athletic Association.

Over 546 varsity athletes compete in football, men's and women's basketball, men's and women's soccer, men's and women's tennis, women's swimming and diving, women's volleyball, baseball, women's lacrosse, field hockey, men's and women's golf, women's cross country and track and field, and softball. James Madison has won five national championships in football (2), field hockey, women's lacrosse, and archery, giving the Dukes the second-most national titles by a college or university in Virginia.

Beginning no later than July 1, 2028 the Dukes will compete in the American Athletic Conference.

== Notable people ==
=== Alumni ===
- List of James Madison University alumni
