= Samuel Page Duke =

American university president (1885–1955)

Dr. Samuel Page Duke

Samuel Page Duke (September 5, 1885 in Ferrum, Virginia – April 25, 1955) was the second President of James Madison University, serving from 1919 to 1949. It is from his name and bulldog that the University draws its nickname and mascot.

== Education ==
Samuel Duke was a graduate of Randolph Macon in 1906. There he played baseball, football, and ran track. In 1910 he moved to Richmond from Oklahoma and received a Master of Arts degree from the Teachers College of Columbia University in 1913.

== Career ==
For two years after his graduation he taught at Willie Halsell College, a Methodist school in Vinita, Oklahoma. In 1908 he moved back to Virginia where he served as a principal in Chase City.

Duke headed the education department at Farmville Normal School (later renamed Longwood University) until 1917, when he was appointed as vice president of the Virginia State Teachers Association. In 1918 Duke became the state supervisor of high schools for the state of Virginia. He held this position until 1919 when he became the president of James Madison University, then called the State Normal School for Women.

During his first 10 years at James Madison University, he would build Alumnae, Sheldon, Keezell, Johnston Halls and Varner House. This achievement would earn him the nickname, "The Builder." At the beginning of his term in 1919 James Madison University was called the State Normal School for Women. In 1924 he campaigned to change the name to State Teachers College at Harrisonburg to reflect a broader mission. During his tenure, Duke would be the first president to give men degrees from James Madison University, then called State Teachers College at Harrisonburg. On June 12, 1938, Duke renamed the school to Madison College, named after the fourth President of the United States. He continued to serve the school until 1949 when poor health led to his resignation.

== Personal life ==
On 26 August 1908 in Georgetown, Texas, he married Linnie Lucile Campbell. They had one daughter and three sons.

Preceded by Julian Ashby Burruss	James Madison University President; 1919–1949	Succeeded by G. Tyler Miller
