= The Future of Truth =

The Future of Truth may refer to

- The Future of Truth (Herzog book), a 2024 book by Werner Herzog
- The Future of Truth (Rosenbaum book), a 2026 book by Steven Rosenbaum

== See also ==
- Truth § Modern and contemporary
- 935 Lies: The Future of Truth and the Decline of America's Moral Integrity, a 2014 book by Charles Lewis
