= Oliver Reynolds Wulf =

US chemist, physicist & meteorologist (1897-1987)

Oliver Reynolds Wulf (22 April 1897, Norwich, Connecticut – 11 January 1987) was a chemist, physicist, and meteorologist, known for his research on nitrogen fixation, ozone, atmospheric dynamics, and ions and winds in the ionosphere.

== Biography ==
After high school in Connecticut, Oliver entered Worcester Polytechnic Institute in 1915. His education was interrupted when he joined the U. S. Navy in June 1918. After an honorable discharge in April 1919, he returned to Worcester and received his chemistry B.S. in 1920. In 1920–1922 Wulf was a junior chemist in the Fixed Nitrogen Research Laboratory at the U. S. Department of Agriculture. After becoming engaged to be married and having completed an M.S. in chemistry at American University, he took a job in the brass works for the Bristol Company in Waterbury, Connecticut during the summer of 1922. Wulf married Beatrice Mae Jones on October 21, 1922. He accepted an offer for graduate study at Caltech and the Wulfs went by train to Caltech in March 1923. Working under the supervision of Richard C. Tolman, Wulf did research on the kinetics of the thermal decomposition of ozone. He, with Tolman's help, developed a method by which ozone flowed through a coil of glass tubing; the ozone decomposed at a rate depending on two parameters: (1) the concentration of ozone in the tubing and (2) the temperature of the glass. Wulf's 1926 PhD thesis and three published articles he co-authored with Tolman were based on the flow method. After completing his PhD, Wulf received a National Research Fellowship, which supported his work with U. C. Berkeley's Raymond Birge on the molecular spectroscopy of ozone. After completion of the fellowship at Berkeley, Wulf and his wife Bea took three weeks to drive their Ford Model T from Berkeley to Washington D.C. From 1928–1939 Wulf worked as a chemist and physicist for the Bureau of Chemistry and Soils in the U. S. Department of Agriculture. During this period of employment Wulf took a leave of absence for the academic year 1932–1933 when he was awarded a Guggenheim Fellowship. He and Bea spent the first six months of the fellowship in Berlin, where he associated with Michael Polanyi. During part of the final six months of the fellowship the Wulfs were in Göttingen, where Oliver Wulf associated with James Franck. The Wulfs later travelled in Europe, Mexico and the Caribbean. In 1939, on the strength of Carl Rossby's recommendation, Wulf was appointed a senior meteorologist in the U. S. Weather Bureau, for which he worked from 1939 until his retirement in 1967. From 1941 to 1945 the U. S. Weather Bureau assigned him to the University of Chicago's Institute of Meteorology to teach meteorology to U. S. Air Force cadets. In 1945 the Weather Bureau assigned Wulf to Caltech to work as a research associate with the rank of full professor of chemistry and chemical engineering. He remained on this assignment until his 1967 retirement. After his retirement, Wulf did research with Seth Nicholson, working with the solar telescope and other equipment at the Mount Wilson observatory. Wulf and Nicholson published several articles based upon their study of the relation between solar activity, geomagnetic activity, and Earth’s magnetic field. They also studied the Moon's effects in perturbing recurrent geomagnetic activity induced by the Sun. In one project Wulf and Nicholson studied global atmospheric tides induced by the Moon and the Sun.

In 1935 Wulf won the American Chemical Society's Hillebrand Prize. In 1949 Wulf was elected a member of the U. S. National Academy of Sciences.

== Selected works ==
- Wulf, O.R. (1927). "The magnetic behavior of ozone". Proc Natl Acad Sci U S A. 13 (11): 744–748. Bibcode:1927PNAS...13..744W. doi:10.1073/pnas.13.11.744. PMC 1085222. PMID 16587267.
- Wulf, O. R. (1928). "A progression relation in the molecular spectrum of oxygen occurring in the liquid and in the gas at high pressure". Proc Natl Acad Sci U S A. 14 (8): 609–613. Bibcode:1928PNAS...14..609W. doi:10.1073/pnas.14.8.609. PMC 1085649. PMID 16587375.
- Wulf, O. R. (1928). "The heat of dissociation of oxygen as estimated from photochemical ozonization". Proc Natl Acad Sci U S A. 14 (8): 614–617. Bibcode:1928PNAS...14..614W. doi:10.1073/pnas.14.8.614. PMC 1085650. PMID 16587376.
- Wulf, O. R. (1930). "The band spectrum of ozone in the visible and photographic infra-red". Proc Natl Acad Sci U S A. 16 (7): 507–511. Bibcode:1930PNAS...16..507W. doi:10.1073/pnas.16.7.507. PMC 526677. PMID 16577280.

== See also ==
- Absorption band § Absorption bands of interest to the atmospheric physicist
