= Mara Liasson =

American journalist and political pundit (born 1955)

- Born: June 13, 1955 (age 71); New York City, U.S.
- Education: Brown University (BA)
- Occupations: Journalist; political correspondent
- Employer: NPR
- Notable credit(s): National Public Radio; FOX News Sunday; Washington Week

Mara Liasson (/ˈmɑːrə ˈlaɪ.əsən/; born June 13, 1955) is an American journalist and political pundit. She is the national political correspondent for NPR, and a contributor at Fox News Channel.

== Early life ==
Liasson was born in New York City to a Jewish family. She grew up in Scarsdale, New York and graduated from Scarsdale High School in 1973. Additionally, when she was studying at Scarsdale High School, she was one of a few students to form the Scarsdale Alternative School, an experimental democratic community that still exists today. She is a graduate of Brown University (class of 1977) with a bachelor's degree in American history.

== Career ==
Liasson's first reporting job was at The Vineyard Gazette, on Martha’s Vineyard, Mass. Liasson was a freelance radio and television reporter in San Francisco and worked at Berkeley's KPFA before joining NPR in 1985. She was awarded a Knight-Bagehot Fellowship in Economics and Business Journalism to study at Columbia University Graduate School of Journalism for a year; she took leave to do that in 1988–89, then became NPR's congressional correspondent. She was NPR's White House correspondent from 1992 to 2001, receiving the White House Correspondents' Association's Merriman Smith Award for daily news coverage for 1994, 1995 and 1997. She is now NPR's national political correspondent.

She joined Fox News in 1997. She is a regular contributor to Special Report with Bret Baier and a panelist on FOX News Sunday.

She has also worked as a panelist for the WETA-TV weekend news program Washington Week, which is aired on many PBS member stations.

== Personal life ==
She was married to the late Jonathan Cuneo, a partner in the law firm of Cuneo Gilbert & LaDuca in Washington, D.C. They have three children.
