= ClassWish =

U.S. nonprofit organization

ClassWish.org
- Type: Non-profit organization
- Industry: Education
- Founded: 2008
- Headquarters: New York, U.S.
- Key people: Patrik Silen, chairman
- Website: ClassWish.org

ClassWish is a nonprofit organization that addresses the shortage of funding for supplies and equipment in K–12 schools. ClassWish has the items shipped directly to the schools at no cost to the school or teacher.

ClassWish.org was founded in 2008 as a project of ImportantGifts Inc, a 501(c)(3) nonprofit, whose chairman is Steven Spiegel, a former Skadden Arps attorney. It now has its own tax-exempt status.

== Recognition ==
On October 21, 2009, ClassWish was picked as one of nine "Best Non-Profits Dedicated to Parents, Students, and Teachers" along with Teach For America and Teachers Without Borders, among others. Also, EduDemic listed ClassWish as one of 210 websites that "help teacher make learning fun" on June 14, 2010.

== Notable Board of Advisors ==
The ClassWish Board of Advisors includes:

- Esther Dyson, investor and philanthropist
- Steven Rosenbaum, founder of Magnify Media
