= Ernest Cuneo =

American football player (1905–1988)

- Born: May 27, 1905; Carlstadt, New Jersey
- Died: March 1, 1988 (aged 82); Washington, D.C.
- Education: Columbia University (BA, LLB, LLM)
- Occupations: Professional athlete, Lawyer, Newspaperman, Author, Intelligence liaison
- Notable work: Life With Fiorello (1955) "National Whirligig" column (1962–1980) "Take It or Leave It" column (1968–1972)
- Spouse: Margaret Watson
- Children: 2, including Jonathan
- Football career

Profile
- Positions: Fullback, guard, halfback

Personal information
- Listed height: 5 ft 9 in (1.75 m)
- Listed weight: 192 lb (87 kg)

Career information
- College: Columbia; Penn State

Career history
- Orange Tornadoes (1929); Brooklyn Dodgers (1930)
- Stats at Pro Football Reference

Ernest L. Cuneo (May 27, 1905 – March 1, 1988) was an American lawyer, newspaperman, author, and intelligence liaison. He was also a professional football player in the National Football League.

== Early life and education ==
Cuneo was also a star athlete in high school and later played football at Columbia University and Pennsylvania State University. Afterwards, he played two seasons in the NFL for the Orange Tornadoes and the Brooklyn Dodgers.

Cuneo's first newspaper experience was as editor of the school newspaper at East Rutherford High School in East Rutherford, New Jersey. Cuneo then attended Columbia University, where he earned a Bachelor of Arts degree. During his college vacations, Cuneo worked for the New York Daily News. Cuneo began to study law at Columbia Law School. He then studied at St. John's University, earning an LL.B. degree in 1931.

== Career ==
After completing law school at St. John's in February 1931, Cuneo became law secretary to Fiorello H. LaGuardia, who was then a congressman representing New York. During this time, he would brief LaGuardia on the investigations of judicial malpractice and fraudulent bankruptcies. His 1955 memoir Life With Fiorello would serve in large part for the basis of the Tony Award-winning musical Fiorello! In the year before Pearl Harbor he ghost wrote pro-British articles for newspapers as part of a covert anti-Nazi effort to build support for Britain's war effort.

In 1936, James Farley appointed Cuneo associate general counsel of the Democratic National Committee. According to Neal Gabler, from the mid-1930s on, Cuneo not only acted as a liaison between Franklin Roosevelt and Walter Winchell, but he frequently wrote long political items for the Winchell column.

=== World War II service ===
When World War II began, General William Donovan, who was head of the Office of Strategic Services (OSS), appointed Cuneo a liaison officer between the OSS, British Security Coordination (a part of MI-6), the Federal Bureau of Investigation, the United States Department of State, and U.S. President Franklin Roosevelt.

A friend of the muckraking newspaper columnist and broadcaster Drew Pearson, Cuneo used his position at the OSS to leak stories on U.S. commanders and their behavior. Pearson, whose reputation had been severely damaged after President Roosvelt had publicly called him a liar, wanted to strike back at the administration and its conduct of the war. Cuneo suggested to Pearson that a sensational, exclusive news story would make people forget Roosevelt's criticism, and offered Pearson details of General George S. Patton's slapping of a private soldier he had learned from others in the War Department. Pearson's resulting broadcasts and news articles sufficiently concerned Secretary of War Henry L. Stimson that he requested Army General Joseph T. McNarney to "..put an inspector on the War Department to see who has been leaking out information. Pearson's articles are about three-quarters false but there's just a germ of truth in them that someone must have given him."

While working with Donovan and British Intelligence, Cuneo became acquainted with such notable people as Sir William Stephenson, Roald Dahl, Noël Coward, Ivar Bryce, and James Bond creator Ian Fleming. A particularly close friendship developed between Fleming and Cuneo, and Fleming named a taxi driver in his James Bond novel Diamonds Are Forever "Ernie Cureo" (sic). Fleming later credited Cuneo with more than half the plot for Goldfinger and all of the basic plot for Thunderball; the dedication of the latter novel reads, "To Ernest Cuneo, Muse." For his service during the war, Cuneo was decorated by Italy, Great Britain, and the City of Genoa.

=== Post-war activities ===
In March 1951, Cuneo and a small group of investors purchased the North American Newspaper Alliance (NANA). In addition, Cuneo and the Bell Syndicate-North American Newspaper Alliance group acquired the McClure Newspaper Syndicate in September 1952, with Louis Ruppel installed as president and editor. Cuneo acquired full control over NANA in the mid-1950s and served as president until 1963 when he sold it. Because of Cuneo's association with former members of American and British intelligence, including Fleming and Bryce, and because some writers in the Cuneo era had alleged links to the CIA, critics have suggested that NANA under his tenure was a front for espionage. Cuneo was involved with the Citizens Committee for a Free Cuba, an anti-Castro organisation formed in the 1960s.

He remained with NANA as a columnist and military analyst from 1963 to 1980. For a number of years Cuneo wrote a syndicated column, "Take It or Leave It," which appeared three times a week. Earlier (in the early 1960s) he took over the "National Whirligig," the original "news behind the news" column which appeared five days a week; writing that column until his death.

He also later served as editor-at-large of The Saturday Evening Post.

Cuneo also wrote several books. His writings also appeared in several articles posted by the Professional Football Researchers Association. These writing reflected on Cuneo's own experiences in the NFL, as well as his friendship with Pro Football Hall of Famer Benny Friedman.

== Published works ==
- Life with Fiorello, Macmillan 1955
- "Present at the Creation: Professional Football in the Twenties." American Scholar, 1987
- "I Remember Benny", 1986
- "In the Same League", 1988
