= The Outsider (2021 film) =

2021 American film

- Directed by: Steven Rosenbaum; Pamela Yoder
- Distributed by: Abramorama
- Release date: August 19, 2021 (Facebook)
- Country: United States
- Language: English

The Outsider is a 2021 American documentary film directed by Steven Rosenbaum and Pamela Yoder about the making of the National September 11 Memorial & Museum in New York City.

Using footage collected over eight years, the film follows the journey of the museum's creative director Michael Shulan (the titular "outsider") from the day of the September 11 attacks to the building's opening in 2014. Shulan "is initially optimistic about the project's aims but becomes dispirited by the end results. Viewers follow Shulan, who left the institution shortly after it opened, as he starts to believe the site feels more like a New York City tourist attraction akin to Times Square than a museum offering a nuanced portrayal of history."

The Outsider premiered on Facebook in August 2021.
