= Investigative Reporting Workshop =

Nonprofit newsroom at American University in Washington, D.C.

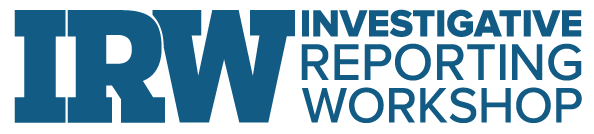
- Founded: March 2008
- Founder: Charles Lewis; Wendell Cochran
- Type: 501(c)(3)
- Purpose: Investigative Journalism
- Location: Washington DC
- Method: Foundation and Member Supported
- Executive Editor: Lynne Perri (interim)
- Parent organization: American University School of Communication
- Website: investigativereportingworkshop.org

The Investigative Reporting Workshop (IRW) is an editorially independent newsroom in the American University School of Communication in Washington, D.C., focused on investigative journalism. It pairs students with professional newsrooms to publish projects. It has partnered with dozens of newsrooms on hundreds of investigations, working with over 240 student journalists.

Since 2013, IRW has had a partnership with The Washington Post in which graduate students work as researchers and reporters on major stories, including its coverage of the causes, costs and aftermath of the January 6 United States Capitol attack. That coverage was awarded the 2022 Pulitzer Prize for public service.

Other reporting partnerships have included collaborations with PBS Frontline, NBC News, WAMU-FM, Reveal News, The New Yorker, ABC World News Tonight, Politico, The Philadelphia Inquirer, Public Health Watch, McClatchy newspapers, Mother Jones, and Columbia Journalism Review.

IRW is funded primarily by grants from private foundations and donations from individuals. IRW is a tax-exempt organization. The Workshop operates under the 501(c)(3) designation of American University.

== History ==
=== Founding ===
IRW was founded by professors Charles Lewis and Wendell Cochran, a longtime business reporter and editor. The newsroom began publishing original content in spring 2009. The model for the Workshop is the Children's Television Workshop, which originally was created to produce “Sesame Street,” but became an incubator and innovator for much of educational television.

Lewis served as the executive editor for 16 years, from IRW's founding until retiring in December 2022. John Sullivan served as interim executive editor during the search for a permanent replacement.

=== Post-Charles Lewis era ===
In July 2023, Pulitzer Prize-winning journalist Wesley J. Lowery joined the Investigative Reporting Workshop as executive editor.

Other editors currently include: John Sullivan is a senior editor. He won a Pulitzer Prize at The Philadelphia Inquirer and The Washington Post. He is also associate editor for the Post's investigations team, and runs an investigative practicum at the graduate level inside the Post's newsroom. Aarushi Sahejpal is data editor at IRW. He is an adjunct professor of data journalism in the School of Communication, and a data reporter on The Accountability Project at The Center for Public Integrity. Sahejpal is a former intern at IRW.

Since Lewis' departure, IRW’s coverage has examined toxic air and water — or lack of access to water — and other environmental and health issues nationwide generally, and in Texas in particular, with the nonprofit Public Health Watch. Other stories have focused on immigration policy changes and sexual assaults in Virginia schools. IRW has continued coverage of fatal shootings by police with The Washington Post, as well as contributing to a series of stories about the NFL blocking the rise of Black coaches. While topics vary widely, IRW focuses on accountability.

Lowery resigned from IRW and the AU School of Communication, where he held a tenured faculty appointment, in March 2025 just before a series of articles in the Columbia Journalism Review and The Washington Post alleged he made inappropriate sexual comments to female coworkers, including interns, and sexually assaulted at least four other journalists who were not his coworkers. CJR wrote that he exhibited a "pattern of predatory behavior toward young women in journalism" spanning from 2018 to 2024.

After Lowery left, IRW's founding managing editor and AU journalism professor Lynne Perri was named interim executive editor.

== Notable work ==
=== Investigating Power ===
The online multimedia project Investigating Power showcases more than 50 hours of interviews with professional journalists. This project documents "moments of truth" in contemporary U.S. history and the careers of notable journalists since the 1950s. It is a part of a larger project and book, "The Future of Truth," by Charles Lewis, the former "60 Minutes" producer.

In January 2018, Investigating Power was reworked with a new look and additional content. The update added educator resources for both the middle and high school level and the undergraduate/post-secondary level.

=== FRONTLINE documentaries ===
The Workshop had a partnership with the PBS program Frontline. Productions include "Flying Cheap" a documentary about the impact of the major carriers’ reliance on regional airlines and their pilots, which won a Screen Actors Guild Award for writing; a follow-up, “Flying Cheaper,” a follow-up about the impact of outsourcing maintenance on planes; and “Lost in Detention,” a documentary that chronicled the administration’s enforcement policy, which has deported 400,000 people annually the last two years and put thousands in detention centers with legal representation, often splitting up families in which the children are U.S. citizens. In 2012 and 2013, the Workshop also co-produced "Big Sky, Big Money", which chronicles campaign finance in Montana; "The Digital Campaign", about the 2012 presidential race; and "Hunting the Nightmare Bacteria", a look at the pervasive problem of drug resistant infections in hospitals.

In 2017, The Workshop collaborated with Frontline to produce "Poverty, Politics, and Profit: The Housing Crisis".

In 2018, The Workshop co-produced "Blackout in Puerto Rico", with PBS Frontline and NPR. It aired on PBS stations across the country and online.

== National awards ==
Charles Lewis, executive editor of the Investigative Reporting Workshop, talks about winning the I.F. Stone Medal for Journalistic Independence from the Nieman Foundation at Harvard University.

=== I.F. Stone Award ===
The Nieman Foundation for Journalism at Harvard University honored Lewis, IRW's founding executive editor, with the 2018 I.F. Stone Medal for Journalistic Independence. The award honors investigative reporter I.F. Stone and goes out annually to a journalist whose work captures the spirit of journalistic independence, integrity and courage that characterized I.F. Stone’s Weekly.

=== Pulitzer Prize ===
John Sullivan partners with The Washington Post to provide ongoing, hands-on opportunities for IRW students, enabling high-impact investigations, such as The Attack (the centerpiece of the Post's 2022 Pulitzer Prize-winning public service coverage), Murder with Impunity (a Pulitzer finalist), and Fatal Force (a log of every fatal shooting by an on-duty police officer in the U.S. since 2015). These students conduct substantive data research to shed light on inequity and abuse of power in America.

=== The Emmy Awards ===
“The Healthcare Divide", the most recent of many collaborations over the years among veteran FRONTLINE writer-producer Rick Young and his team, NPR and the Investigative Reporting Workshop, was nominated for an Emmy Award for Outstanding Business, Consumer or Economic coverage. The program, which aired in 2021, looked at disparities in American health care and the large urban hospitals hit hard by the pandemic. Reporters traveled across the country over four months to examine the market forces and uneven government support that were deepening the problems. They found widening resources between rich hospitals and those that serve the poor.

=== Frank Morton Award from the Overseas Press Club ===
“Trump’s Trade War,” a FRONTLINE-NPR collaboration in association with IRW, is the 2020 winner of the Morton Frank Award from the Overseas Press Club for best international business news reporting in TV, video, radio, audio or podcast. Young also won a Writers Guild Award, announced in February, for the same program.

=== Murrow Award ===
“Collateral Damage” won a regional Edward R. Murrow award in 2019 from the Radio Television Digital News Association (RTDNA) in the Investigative Reporting Category for Large Market Radio Stations.

The story, produced in partnership with WAMU-88.5, revealed that few police departments are better at finding illegal guns than D.C.’s. But residents in some majority-African American neighborhoods say that trying to get those guns off the street has led to overly aggressive police tactics, including being unfairly targeted for stop-and-frisks.

IRW worked with reporter Patrick Madden and a team at the NPR affiliate to produce on-air and online stories.

== See also ==
- Institute for Nonprofit News (member)
