= Charles Lewis (journalist) =

American journalist, founder of The Center for Public Integrity

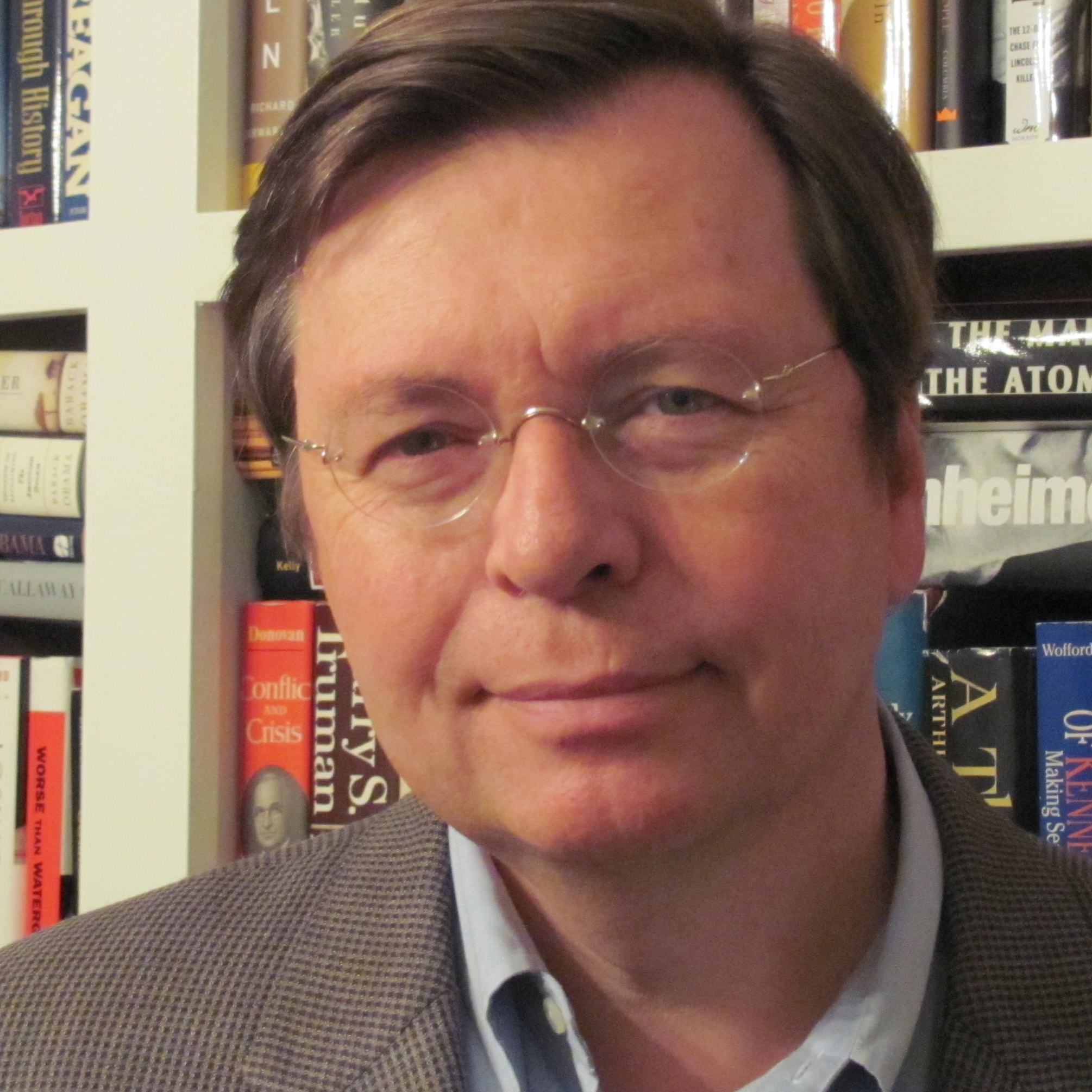
- Born: Charles Reed Esray Lewis III; October 30, 1953 (age 73)
- Education: University of Delaware (BA); Johns Hopkins University (MA)
- Spouse: Pamela B. Gilbert
- Website: Official website

Charles Lewis (born October 30, 1953) is an investigative journalist based in Washington, D.C. He founded The Center for Public Integrity and the Investigative Reporting Workshop at American University, where he served for 16 years as executive editor.

He was previously an investigative producer for ABC News and the CBS news program 60 Minutes. He left 60 Minutes in 1989 and founded the Center for Public Integrity (CPI), a nonprofit news organization. In 1997, he led the creation of the International Consortium of Investigative Journalists, which focuses on cross-border crime and corruption. CPI was awarded a Pulitzer Prize in 2014 for investigative reporting, with ICIJ winning 2017 in the category of explanatory reporting for the “Panama Papers” scandal.

He was a Ferris Professor at Princeton University in 2005, a Shorenstein Fellow at Harvard University in the spring of 2006, and is currently a tenured professor of journalism at American University in Washington, D.C. He is the author of the 2014 book is 935 Lies: The Future of Truth and the Decline of America’s Moral Integrity In 2018, he was awarded the I.F. Stone Medal for Journalistic Independence by Harvard's Nieman Foundation.

== Early life and education ==
Charles Reed Esray Lewis III grew up in a middle-class family in Newark, Delaware, where he attended public schools and graduated from Newark High School in 1971. As a senior, he was elected president of the school’s student government association, and he also wrote for the student newspaper, the Yellowjacket Buzz.

Lewis majored in political science at the University of Delaware. He worked weeknights in the sports department of the Wilmington News Journal newspapers, writing stories and a weekly column. In the spring of 1974, he served as a paid intern in the Washington office of Senator William Roth (R-DE). He graduated in 1975. In June 1977, he received a master’s degree from the Johns Hopkins University School of Advanced International Studies, in Washington, D.C.

Lewis is married to Pamela B. Gilbert, a consumer-protection lawyer and former executive director of the U.S. Consumer Product Safety Commission. They live in the Washington, D.C., area. They have two children.

== Career ==
In October 1977, ABC News Vice President Sander Vanocur hired Lewis to be a reportorial producer (off-air reporter) in the newly created Special Reporting Unit, based in Washington, D.C.

=== CBS 60 Minutes ===
In early 1984, CBS News, in New York, hired Lewis as an associate producer for its news magazine program 60 Minutes. He was assigned to work with senior correspondent Mike Wallace, and was promoted to full producer.

During the preparation of his last story, "Foreign Agent," both Wallace and 60 Minutes executive producer Don Hewitt forced Lewis to remove from his script the name of former Commerce Secretary Peter G. Peterson, a close personal friend of Hewitt's. Lewis deeply resented the internal censorship and quit 60 Minutes.

=== Center for Public Integrity ===
In October 1989, from his home in the Washington, D.C. area, Lewis founded the Center for Public Integrity, whose mission was to pursue investigative reporting based on intensive, long-term projects involving teams of researchers and extensive documents. Within a few months, the Center was incorporated as a tax-exempt nonprofit with Lewis on the board of directors along with journalists Alejandro Benes and Charles Piller.

Lewis was awarded a MacArthur Fellowship in 1998.

From 1989 to 2004, under Lewis' tenure as executive director, the Center for Public Integrity published roughly 275 investigative reports and 14 books. Three of them, co-authored by Lewis and published by HarperCollins, were finalists for book-of-the-year honors by Investigative Reporters and Editors:

- The Buying of the President (1996)
- The Buying of the Congress (1998)
- The Buying of the President 2000

The Buying of the President 2004, Lewis' fifth and last co-authored book with the Center, was a New York Times bestseller.

In 2009, The Encyclopedia of Journalism cited Lewis as "one of the 30 most notable investigative reporters in the U.S. since World War I." That same year, he was given an honorary degree by his alma mater the University of Delaware. In 2013, the University of Missouri awarded him its Honor Medal for Distinguished Service in Journalism.

=== Investigative Reporting Workshop ===
Lewis founded the Investigative Reporting Workshop at the American University School of Communication with Wendell Cochran in 2008. He served as its first executive editor from its founding until his retirement in December 2022, shortly after IRW shared a Pulitzer Prize with The Washington Post for their account of the January 6 United States Capitol attack.
