= American University School of Communication =

University department in Washington, DC

School of Communication (SOC)
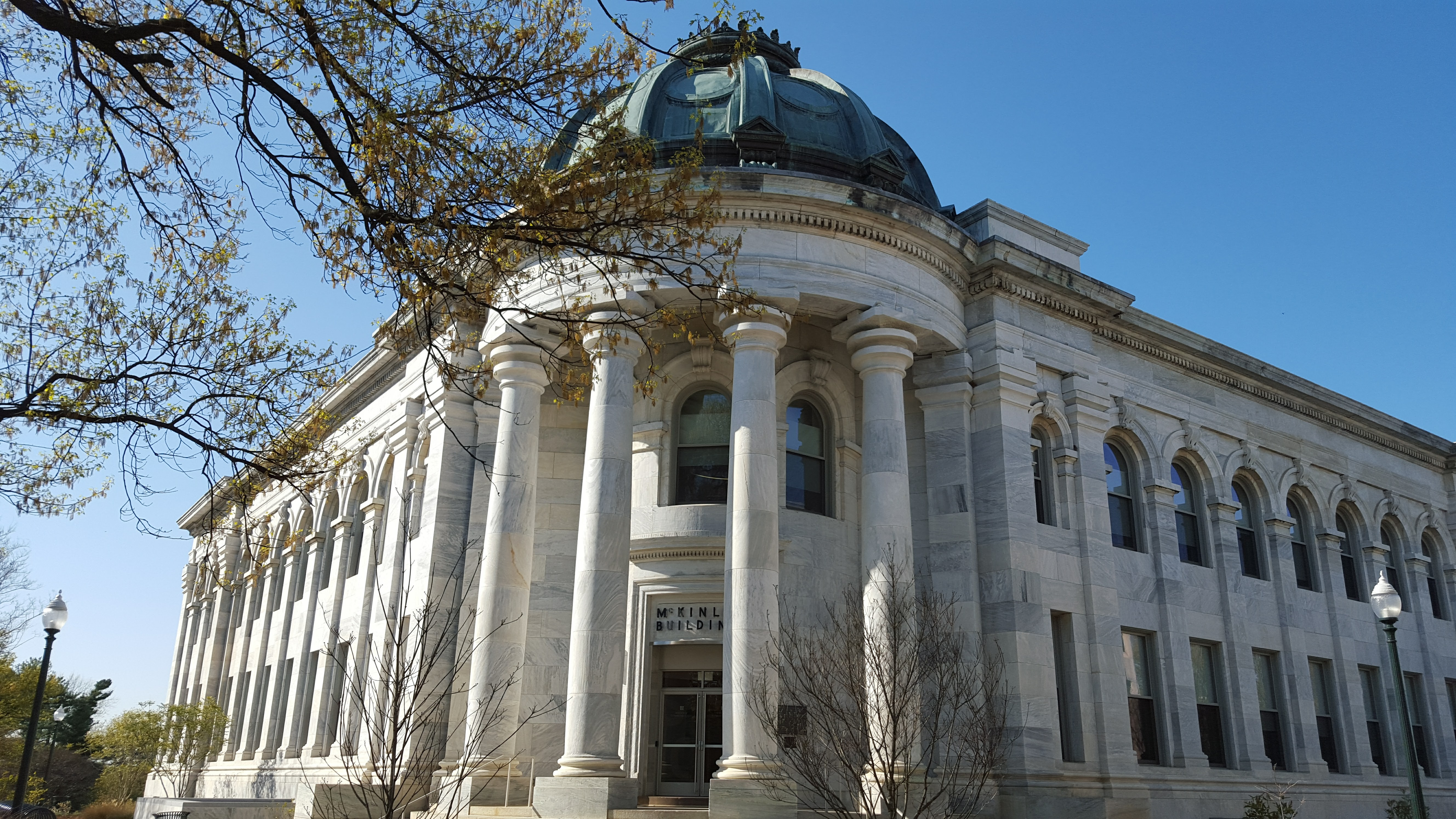
- The McKinley Building, where the School of Communication is housed
- Type: Private
- Established: 1893 as Department of Communication. 1984 becomes School of Communication. Independent of the College of Arts and Sciences in 1993
- Parent institution: American University
- Dean: Marnel Niles Goins
- Academic staff: 54 full-time
- Students: 1441 (Spring 2024)
- Undergraduates: 1110 (Spring 2024)
- Postgraduates: 331 (Spring 2024)
- Location: Washington, District of Columbia, United States
- Campus: Suburban
- Website: https://american.edu/soc

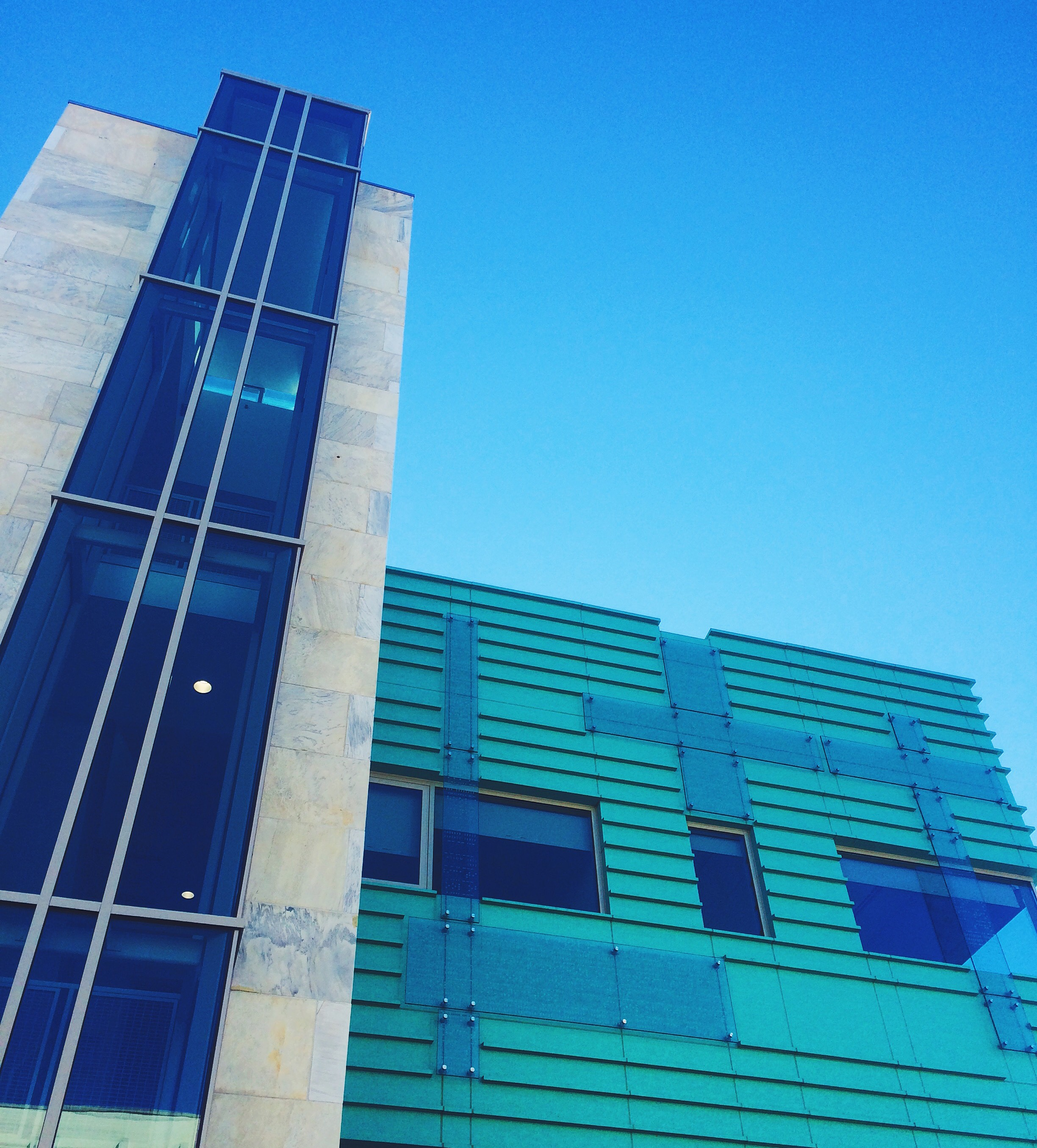
This is an outside view of the newest addition to the McKinley Building

The School of Communication (SOC) is American University's school of mass communication, media studies and journalism, founded originally as the Department of Communication in 1893 with the founding of the university. It is accredited by the Accrediting Council on Education in Journalism and Mass Communications.

The school offers six undergraduate majors: communication studies, journalism, public relations and strategic communication, photography, and communication, language, and culture (the last two jointly administered with the College of Arts and Sciences) along with a minor in communication. In addition, interdisciplinary degrees such as communications, law, economics and government (CLEG, which is housed in the School of Public Affairs), take classes within SOC. SOC offers 12 graduate programs, including one PhD and one graduate certificate. Undergraduates in any major at AU are given the opportunity to complete a combined bachelor's/master's within SOC.

== History ==
The Department of Communication was founded in 1893 in the College of Liberal Arts, the predecessor to the College of Arts and Sciences. In 1984, it became the School of Communication and in 1993, SOC left CAS to become the sixth academic unit of AU. It is the second-newest school, after the School of Education, which became independent of CAS in 2019.

The School of Communication is headquartered in the McKinley Building, which was built in 1907, making it the second building on campus, and named after President William McKinley. It was completely renovated in 2012 and reopened in 2014. McKinley houses specialized classrooms, multi-purpose learning spaces, computer labs supporting digital imaging, online content creation, motion graphics, multichannel audio, and full HD video editing.

Sam Fulwood III, a journalist, author and public policy analyst, was named dean of SOC on January 11, 2021. Fulwood was the school's first Black dean. SOC successes under Fulwood included "the Pulitzer Prize shared by 8 SOC graduate students as part of a Washington Post-winning reporting team, the launch of the student-led integrated communications agency SOC3, and the establishment of an SOC/ESPN fellowship program for investigative and enterprise journalism." He left the role in May 2023 for an undisclosed reason.

Leena Jayaswal, professor in Film & Media Arts, director of the Photography BA program and former associate dean for faculty affairs, took over as interim dean for the 2023-24 school year.

Dr. Marnel Niles Goins, a communication scholar who was dean of the College of Sciences and Humanities and professor of Communication at Marymount University, was named dean of SOC on May 7, 2024.

== Divisions and Centers ==
SOC has four academic divisions:

- Journalism, which offers a BA in Journalism, MA in Journalism & Public Affairs and MA in Journalism & Storytelling.
- Film and Media Arts, which offers a BA in Film & Media Arts, BA in Photography, MFA in Film & Media Arts, MA in Film & Media Production, MA in Producing Film, Television & Video, MA in Game Design, MFA in Games & Interactive Media and Graduate Certificate in Game Design.
- Public Communication, which offers a BA in Public Relations & Strategic Communication, MA in Strategic Communication and MA in Political Communication.
- Communication Studies, which offers a BA in Communication Studies, MA in Media, Technology and Democracy and PhD in Communication Studies.

SOC houses two nonprofit newsrooms, the Investigative Reporting Workshop (IRW) and the trade journal Current, and five academic centers: the Center for Environmental Filmmaking, Center for Media and Social Impact, AU Game Center, Internet Governance Lab and Institute for Immersive Designs, Experiences, Applications, and Stories (Institute for IDEAS).

== Notable alumni ==
- Jarrett Bellini, American writer and humorist
- Jim Brady, editor-in-chief, Digital First Media
- Alisyn Camerota, anchor and correspondent, Fox News
- Jamie Erdahl, reporter and host, CBS Sports
- Barry Josephson, president, Josephson Entertainment
- Michael Kempner, president and chief executive officer, The MWW Group
- Rick Leventhal, senior correspondent, Fox News
- Barry Levinson, writer, director, and Producer, Baltimore Pictures
- Giuliana Rancic, host, E! News
- Cecilia Vega, correspondent and anchor, ABC News
- Susan Zirinsky, president, CBS News
- John Balestrieri, Former CTO, Ogilvy

== Notable faculty ==
- Sanford J. Ungar, former Dean of American University School of Communication and President of Goucher College
- Russell Williams II, American production sound mixer, two-time Academy Awards winner for Best Sound
- Patricia Aufderheide, scholar and public intellectual on media and social change, expert on fair use in media creation and scholarship.
- Chris Palmer (film producer), world-renowned environmental and wildlife producer, director of the Center for Environmental Filmmaking at American University.
- Laura DeNardis, American author and globally recognized scholar of Internet governance and technical infrastructure, tenured Professor and Associate Dean at American University School of Communication.
- Charles Lewis, investigative journalist based in D.C., founder of The Center for Public Integrity, and former executive editor of IRW.
- Wesley Lowery, Pulitzer Prize-winning investigative journalist who is the current executive editor of the IRW and an associate professor in the Journalism division.
