= Waywire =

Video-sharing website

Waywire was a video-sharing website launched on April 16, 2013. The company was founded by U.S. Senator Cory Booker, then mayor of Newark, Nathan Richardson, former president of Gilt City, and Sarah Ross, former executive at Yahoo! and TechCrunch.

The company raised $1.75 million in seed funding. Its investors include Eric Schmidt of Google.

In October 2013, Waywire was acquired by Magnify.net, a video aggregation and curation platform founded in 2006 by New York City producer Steven Rosenbaum. In April 2014, Magnify.net adopted the Waywire name for its existing enterprise software business.
