= MTV News: Unfiltered =

American television series

MTV News: Unfiltered is an American television series created by Steven Rosenbaum that aired on MTV in the 1990s. The half-hour show features footage of real events provided by viewers, and later selected and edited by the show's producers. The videos show controversial events in the viewers' community that were not being covered by traditional news outlets.

Fast Company Magazine described the program this way: "Every segment of 'MTV News UNfiltered' begins with a phone call. About 2,500 a week leave their story pitches on voice mail. Steven Rosenbaum and his BNN colleagues review them, identify the best bets, and send out camcorders to their newest correspondents. It's grassroots programming for a different kind of news program."

The Baltimore Sun wrote in 1995 "I was always struck by the arrogance of news people who thought that they knew what was a story, and that there was no way in," said Steven Rosenbaum, 34, the creator of "Unfiltered," who has long put together magazine-type television stories as an independent producer. Mr. Rosenbaum, who sold the "Unfiltered" idea to MTV and now works as executive producer, said he wants a program that offers ordinary citizens an outlet for their stories without interference from newspaper and network news barons. To do that, "Unfiltered" sends cameras to people and allows them, with some guidance from MTV producers, to shoot their own stories. The work is then edited and given MTV pacing by professionals."

Eli Noam wrote at length about UNfiltered in "Peer-to-Peer Video: The Economics, Policy, and Culture of Today's New Mass Medium"

And Fast Company covered the series in "He's Making News - for the Future: Steve Rosenbaum's programs for MTV and CBS are revolutionizing TV by putting the news in the hands of the people who live it." Many people complain about the news. Steven Rosenbaum is reinventing it. He's the founder and executive producer of a fast-growing production company, Broadcast News Networks (BNN), that's challenging some of the most cherished assumptions behind TV news: what gets covered, who gets on camera, how programs get created. Rosenbaum is making news for the future — and making waves in the process. "I'm counting on the fact that viewers want to take over TV," he declares, "That they want to turn TV inside out, to go from being passive viewers to active participants."

Some of the segments from episodes can be found on YouTube here, here, and here.

The complete list of the episodes and segments in each episode follows:

EPISODE 105

Rolling Rebels.

We sent cameras to three different skateboard enthusiasts across the country. Glenn Bookspan (Rockville Centre, NY), Earnie Salmon (Concord, CA), and Nathan Bett (Marquette, MI) documented their struggles with the powers-that-be over their right to skate in peace. What do you think? Should skaters be allowed to skate where they please, or should they be subject to rules and regulations? Let us know what you think!

The System Sucks.

When Jared Frank was suspended from his high school for publishing an underground newspaper called “Vision”, his friend Tom Yufik wanted to document the story. Jared and Tom disobeyed school orders and took advantage of their first amendment rights by putting out a new issue of the paper, with no further punishment from the administration. Any comments about the right to free speech in within a school environment?

You Can’t Stop Cruising.

Some of our viewers showed the problems they face from local police when they go cruising. We were given an inside view of the situation in Portland, Oregon; Albuquerque, New Mexico; and Virginia Beach, Virginia. The cruisers claim it's their only harmless outlet for fun; while the police say it's a nuisance and a traffic impediment. Any other cruisers out there?

NYPD Blues.

A group of urban homesteaders were evicted from their apartments on New York City's East 13th Street on July 4, 1995 by city police in full riot gear. Annie, a squatter, tells her tale of injustice and terror at the hands of the officials and describes the fear she now lives in, waiting for the next police raid. What is your take on this issue?

Born To Be Wild.

Adam Ford of Boston, Massachusetts went to college for five years and got several degrees before realizing he didn’t want to live in the corporate world. His chosen career as a bike messenger brought him to Toronto, Ontario for the world championship bike messenger Olympics, where Adam came in tenth place. Any other bikers out there?

Wardrobe Warriors.

Many students react most strongly to being told what they can and can not wear to school. Such was the case with dozens of students who called us to lodge complaints against their schools’ newly imposed dress codes. Five students got cameras to show us the ridiculous nature, from banned tattoos and earrings to forbidden backpacks. What do you think of dress codes in schools?

EPISODE 106

Beat The S.A.T.

Jake Easton works for the Princeton Review, teaching high school students how to score better on the Scholastic Aptitude Test, or S.A.T. He feels that the test is a biased survey of knowledge, and does not appropriately reflect the intelligence or potential for students. In his segments Jake shows why the test doesn’t work, and gives tips on how to most effectively beat each section of the test. Anybody have any good tips they want to share? How do you feel about the S.A.T.? Is it a fair measure of students’ abilities?

Ferrets Anonymous.

Nicole (who wants her last name and town to remain anonymous) is in direct violation of California law, because she owns a ferret. While she and her friends find them to be loyal house pets, the state government has declared them illegal. In this piece Nicole shows us what ferrets are like as pets, and speaks to several other members of Ferrets Anonymous, a collective of ferret owners who are banding together to fight the power. Any other illegal pet stories out there?

Jet Ski Junkie.

Jen Berkow is addicted to her jet ski. She spends most of her time riding for pleasure or in competitions around her adopted hometown of West Palm Beach, Florida. Her gripe is with people who have a general disregard for water safety, who are spoiling all the fun for responsible water sport enthusiasts. Give us your personal take on the sport — and it's abuses.

Ministry Of Silly Walks.

Brandon Kennedy and Brian White were sitting around bored four years ago, and came up with a great idea — freestyle walking. Well, they thought it was a great idea, anyway. Unfortunately, most of the teachers at their school don’t agree with them. In this story, we see the troubles Brandon and Brian face while pursuing their preferred past time. What do you think? Should they be allowed to freestyle walk in school?

Some Of My Best Friends Are Bald.

Kate Hewitt had to face the harsh realities of cancer when she was diagnosed with Hodgkin's Disease at the age of fifteen. Kate talks about the way her attitude changed due to her involvement in a group for teens with cancer called Some of My Best Friends Are Bald. Her odds for beating the disease are very good, and she realizes now how valuable her life is and how lucky she is to beat “the Big C.” Any personal stories to share?

Italy vs. Iowa.

Poor Matteo Pasino. The Italian student got involved with a foreign exchange program so he could experience the metropolitan glory of an American city for a year. Little did he know that he would be placed in Osceola, Iowa — the most boring place he's ever been. Though he's gaining an entirely new perspective on American culture, he can’t help but feel that his situation sucks.

EPISODE 107

Pugilistic Poultry

If the only animal competition you’ve ever been to is a dog show, brace yourself! Rebecca Andrews takes us on a tour of one of her favorite hobbies — cockfighting. She raises roosters who are bred to peck each other to death in a sort of bird boxing competition. The only catch? The sport is illegal on her home turf of Clay County, Kentucky. She and her group of friends feel this is wrong, since cockfighting is the only thing to do around there. What do you think? Animal rights or excessive boredom? You be the judge.

Striving To Drive

Why is it that someone who is old enough to marry, drive a car, serve in the military, and drink legally can’t rent a car from most major car rental companies? That's a question Dave Werner of St. Louis sought the answer to on the eve of his 25th birthday. Though he was turned down at several companies, he returned the next day and was accepted as a customer. Is it a justified corporate policy or is it age discrimination?

Paraplegic Diver

Scotty Carnahan has cerebral palsy, and he's also a paraplegic due to an auto accident he was in several years ago. His friend Justin Silvia is a professional skydiver who makes a living taking amateurs on tandem skydive missions. As Scotty's birthday drew near, Justin had a great idea — give Scotty a few minutes of freedom from his wheelchair by taking him on a very special adventure! What do you think of Justin's birthday gift to his friend?

Every Picture Tells A Story

Photojournalist Courtney Kealy traveled to exotic Irianjaya to document the comparatively primitive life of the native tribespeople. She feels passionate about recording their way of life before it is phased out by the encroaching Westernization forced upon them by the Indonesian government. Mummies, penis gourds, cigarettes, and native songs and dances — it's all here in Courtney's very special story. What is you’re take on the Westernization of native peoples? Do the benefits outweigh the negatives, or vice versa?

Birth In The Bath

Ellyn MacKay is a registered nurse who feels that she has “the best job in the world.” Unlike most R.N.s, Ellyn helps expectant couples bring their new arrivals into the world in the comfort of a hot tub. She shows us how remarkably calm the labor process is for the mothers, as well as how much more the partner can participate in the process. A groundbreaking piece, but not recommended for the squeamish! What is your personal take on this and other forms of non-conventional childbirth?

The Mosaic Man

If you’ve ever walked through New York City's East Village, you’ve probably seen some of Jim Power's work. For several years now, Jim has been beautifying his neighborhood with elaborate sidewalk and light pole mosaics. In this feature story, Jim explains his passion for his art and his vision for a happier world through mosaics.

EPISODE 108

Worth The Wait

Sex, sex, sex. It's what the media and the advertisers feed us in large daily doses. Well, Crystal Nordberg and some of her friends are taking a defensive stance by swearing their celibacy until marriage through the Christian-values True Love Waits organization. Crystal and her boyfriend Jon explain the reason they’ve sworn themselves to cold showers for the next few years. Do you think the media trivialize sex? Should people wait until marriage? Let us know what you think!

Strife On The Slopes

The long-standing rivalry between skiers and snowboarders finally gets a full-length feature in this Unfiltered piece. We got both sides of the story from skiers, snowboarders, and people who dig both snow sports. Check out the tensions and the triumphs as the two factions slug it out on the slopes! Which group deserves more of the mountain? Can skiers and snowboarders share the trails in peace or should there be separate areas? Give us your viewpoint!

Monkey Business In Texas

When a band of Japanese snow monkeys were brought to Texas a quarter of a century ago, many people were skeptical about their chances for survival. Not only did they survive, they THRIVED! The troop now numbers approximately 600, and measures have been made to control the population. In addition, poachers have killed several of the monkeys, forcing their guardians to raise funds to move the monkeys to a safer environment. Mr. Las Vegas, Wayne Newton pitched in with a benefit concert, and the dedicated group at the South Texas Primate Observatory have been working hard to pull together the remaining money. Check out a cuddly former endangered species and learn the history of the monkeys in this eye-catching and touching story! Who doesn’t love monkeys? How do you feel about poachers hunting the monkeys on their own reservation? What do you think of Mr. Newton's efforts on their behalf? We want to know, so share your opinions!

O.C.A., Go Away

Debbie Caselton of Portland, Oregon faces hatred and attempts at discrimination on a regular basis as a result of the ultra-right-wing Oregon Citizens Alliance. The O.C.A. believes that gay, lesbian, and bisexual people are second-class citizens and should be treated as such. As a lesbian mother of a four-year-old child, Debbie vehemently disagrees and shows us why in this emotionally-charged personal account of her struggle for equality. What do you think of people's attempts to legislate their personal morality on the lives of gay and lesbian citizens? Should the O.C.A. just leave the citizens alone or is their personal crusade against the gay community justified?

Tweeka's Big Day

Having transferred to the University of South Florida at Tampa, John Barber didn’t have time to make many friends. Since he knew he wouldn’t enjoy his graduation exercises as an anonymous student, he decided to spice up his commencement ceremonies by going as his alter ego — the drag persona he calls “Tweeka”! Although he expected negative reactions, almost all of the students and family members he encountered were friendly — many even asked him to pose for pictures with them! Did John/Tweeka find a creative way to make the ceremony more fun or did he make a mockery of the event? We want to hear what you think!

EPISODE 109

A Legal Bedtime

Approximately 1000 municipalities in the United States currently have curfew laws for minors. Many youths (and their parents) believe this is an infringement on their rights as citizens, but government officials argue that it's a necessary crime reduction technique. We sent cameras to three decidedly different cities — San Angelo, TX, Anchorage, AK, and Birmingham, AL — to allow some young people to sound off on the issue.

Is It “Right To Bear Arms”?

The debate between gun control advocates and some gun owners is about as heated as it can get. Firearms aficionado and bail enforcement officer Andy Malik contacted us to voice his views on the topic, as well as to reinforce the issues of safety and responsibility that go hand-in-hand with gun ownership.

Comics & Fanboys & Booth Babes...oh my!

In the early 1980s, a best-selling independent comic book with the strange title “Teenage Mutant Ninja Turtles” opened the door for a plethora of artists to steal some thunder from the mass-market publishers and their conventional superhero titles. Since then, multitudes of Indie publishers have found varying degrees of success by operating outside the major studio system. One self-publisher, Jon “Bean” Hastings, wanted to take us on a whirlwind tour of the Indie comics world at the San Diego Comic Book Convention, where he went to promote his new series Smith Brown Jones.

Pursuit of Happiness

Twenty-one year old Katie Templin called us with a very personal story: her struggle of living with severe depression. Katie used our camera as a video diary, detailing her daily struggle to deal with the constant ups and downs of clinical depression.

A Hairy Situation

If men don’t have to shave their legs and armpits, why should women? This is the question posed by follicle enthusiast Tracy Lawton, who sought out her fellow high schoolers’ opinions on female grooming habits, particularly her own proclivity for body hair.

EPISODE 110

School Security: How Safe Is Your School?

Young people from across the country face violence, drugs and vandalism not only in their community but also at school. Several students brought our cameras inside their school walls to document their various perspectives on what the schools are doing to combat these problems. From police officers in the halls to security cameras to mandatory ID badges, school administrators are trying to make getting an education safer — whether the students like it or not!

All Ages Club v. Police: No Other Place to Go

If the Portland police department has its way, the City Nightclub could soon be facing its last dance. The authorities make the claim of continuing illegal activity there, but Patrick Hill argues the case from the other side. He claims this is nothing more than a case of harassment, since most of the clubgoers are gay, lesbian or bisexual youths. In this segment, Patrick and his friends try to show us what makes this club such a unique place to call home for those young people who say they have no other place to go.

Homeless Vignettes: Homeless Helpers

Viewers in New York City, Houston and San Francisco took cameras to show us how they are using their own skills and resources to help battle the ongoing problem of homelessness in their community. Through outreach centers, bagged lunches, and even leftover bakery products, these good samaritans are trying to make a difference in the lives of those who are less fortunate.

Dog Lady: Teacher's Pets

Educator Susan Bass takes the camera inside her classroom at Grand View Alternative School, which includes both human and canine students. This innovative class teaches abandoned dogs and “problem” teens to work together to help those whose disabilities prevent them from leading their lives alone. 20

Bedpan Collectors: PAN-demonium

Marah Eakin is being brutally honest when she says, “My family is weird.” and support this with an in-depth tour of the family's unusual collection. See, her father has been an avid collector of bedpans & urinals for years; and what started out as a joke a generation ago has now become a family affair.

Police Officer Response: Cops Are People Too

Police Officer Michael Loomis e-mailed us to gripe about several past Unfiltered stories that portrayed cops in a negative light. So we sent him a camera so he could share his perspective from behind the badge.

Jobs Mini: It's A Living

Many calls are received from people who want to show us the unusual ways they bring home the bacon. This piece illustrates the diversity of non-traditional employment, from BB King's guitar manufacturer to the friendly skies, and right to your very own trash can.

Cemetery Boy: Home Sweet Boneyard

Sixteen year-old Cincinnati resident Ray Scott grew up in a red brick house with a big front lawn. Typical Americana, right? Right — EXCEPT that it's filled with tombstones! Ray's father is the caretaker of the local cemetery, and the family lives smack dab in the middle of the hallowed grounds. We sent him a camera to show us what it's like to live among the no-longer-living.

EPISODE 111

Dildos: State Vs. Smut

Atlanta resident Donnell Grey called us after he was arrested for what he calls “archaic” laws in the state of Georgia. You see, Donnell is a clerk at an adult video and novelty store and was arrested for selling genital stimulators (a.k.a. dildos), which according to local laws, can only be sold as novelty devices. Donnell uses our camera to state his case for keeping the government out of all of our bedrooms.

Heroin: Just One Fix

Danielle first shot heroin when she was 18 years old. Now, at 22, she's made the commitment to stay clean for the rest of her life. Danielle's Unfiltered segment details her struggle, her mother's tale of Danielle's near-death experience as the result of an overdose, and allows us to see into the minds of two of her friends who are still using the drug, despite their better judgment.

Accessibility: I Get Around

Before the car accident that paralyzed her below the waist, Sunday Garcia says she never really gave any thought or consideration to the difficulties people with disabilities face in their daily lives. However, now that her wheelchair is a permanent extension of her body, she's learned the hard way that even if we don’t see anyone in a handicapped bathroom or parking space, there's a very good reason to leave them vacant for those who really need them.

Car Culture: Here In My Car

There's something for everyone in Hollywood, but Steve Fitzgerald contacted us to document the subculture he's immersed himself in: the classic hot rod scene. Contrary to popular belief, the love a classic automobile is not limited to wealthy collectors, but includes numerous young people who lovingly detail and restore their own classic cars. In this segment, Fitzgerald introduces us to the basics of the car culture, including the social scene that's been created around their sweet rides.

Straight Edge Response: Razor's “Edge”

In the year since our Unfiltered segment on the anti-drug and alcohol Straight Edge movement first aired, we’ve heard a great deal of response, from both supporters and detractors of the movement. Some people claimed that while our piece played up the positive aspects of the movement, it left out another side of the story. Ryan Mills contacted us to share a different tale: one of extremely violent straight edgers, who attacked and slashed his friend Rich when he lit a joint at a concert.

EPISODE 112

Agoraphobia: Here In My Bedroom

Eighteen year-old Dean called to give us a peek into the thoughts of someone with a mind set most of us haven’t experienced; a world saturated with panic attacks, obsessive-compulsive behavior and most of all, agoraphobia. As a result of Dean's agoraphobia, he has only left the solitude of his house a few times in the past four years, and wanted to show us that despite his long-term struggle, he felt it was important to show others like him that they’re not alone.

Raves: Rave On

We’ve gotten countless calls over the past few months decrying the bad rap that raves have been getting in the media. While many people believe they’re nothing but drug-infested bacchanals with a beat, those who actively participate in them insist that they’re just feel-good dance parties built around the exploding electronic music scene. We sent a camera to Minneapolis-based rave producer Sean Widuch, who wanted to give us the real deal on raves.

Alternative Sports Roundup: We Are The Champions

Forget the Olympics. Forget the Super Bowl and Wimbledon. Forget the Stanley Cup and the World Series. We’ve been flooded with calls from people who are not only pioneers in their chosen sporting events — they’re bona fide champions! Travel to the Scottish Games with Elizabeth Ross; to the International Football Championship with Ryan Mulroney; and to the Extreme Games with Modified Snow Shovel Racing medallist John Strader!

Underground Tattoo Artist: Occupational Outlaws

Mike Dowis contacted us to detail the struggle he and some of his colleagues have undertaken to decriminalize their line of work in their home state. You see, the state of South Carolina made tattooing illegal in the 1960s as a result of a hepatitis epidemic, and that law still remains on the books even though modern sterilization methods make the tattoo application process at least as safe as piercing. He and the other members of South Carolina Advocates for Safe Tattooing took this opportunity to make the rest of the country aware of their legislative plight.

Single Teen Mom

As you can probably guess, it's not easy to be a parent, now try to imagine how hard it would be if you were a sixteen-year-old high school student. Karley Hart called us so she could show other teens how traumatic and exhausting the experience can be; and how the parenting process voids out any remaining sense of freedom and youthful abandon.

Tall Girl/Short Guy: Height Hatred

High school seniors Paul Smuskiewicz and Leela Carroll-Ridella have the same problem: they hate their height. Paul, at 5'5" often finds himself looking UP to underclassmen; while Leela, at 6'1" towers above most of her classmates. We sent cameras to each of them so we could get opposite perspectives on problematic size-related issues such as dating, shopping for clothes, and fitting in.

EPISODE 113

Alcoholic: Mike Shepherd — Wellsville, OH

Mike, a self-declared alcoholic is almost certain he won’t quit drinking, despite the turmoil he puts his family through. A 22 year old native of Wellsville, Ohio, his drinking began as typical youthful experimentation, but has progressed into a debilitating addiction. In this segment, he brings the viewer inside his painful world of substance abuse, and through the cathartic process of sharing his grim lifestyle, he gains insight on the nature of his condition.

Cornerstone: Jorge and Leigh Goyco — Austin, TX

Jorge and his wife, Leigh, create divinely inspired electronica that has captured the attention of the Christian Techno music scene. They are on the verge of being signed by a Christian record label, and recently performed at Cornerstone, an annual Christian music festival. Jorge takes the camera to the show to demonstrate the variety of what he feels is a misunderstood music genre.

Card Thrower: Jon Wedd — Denver, PA

Jon has discovered an unusual mode of self-defense — card throwing. He and his friends get together to hone their skills and ward off small town boredom. They practice techniques on each other's stomachs, drawing blood even, in an effort to demonstrate how an ordinary deck of cards can be used as a powerful defense weapon.

HIV Love Story: Shawn Decker and Mariana — and Brazil

Shawn Decker and Mariana met and became interested in each other on the Internet. Their relationship immediately became more intimate when Shawn encouraged Mariana to visit his homepage, “My Pet Virus”. There, she was introduced to an important side of Shawn's life — that he is living with HIV, a virus that he contracted at the age of eleven. Their feelings for each other transcend both the stereotypes surrounding HIV and the great distance separating them, and they soon fall very much in love. This segment documents their complicated relationship, as Shawn proposes on-line, and then travels to Brazil to personally escort his new fiancé back to the States, where they prepare to forge a life together.
