= Pamela B. Gilbert =

American lawyer

Pamela Gilbert
- Born: October 3, 1958 (age 67); New Brunswick, New Jersey, U.S.
- Education: Tufts University (BA); New York University (JD)
- Employer: Cuneo Gilbert & LaDuca, LLP
- Spouse: Charles Lewis

Pamela B. Gilbert (born October 3, 1958) is an American lawyer. She has been a partner of the law firm Cuneo Gilbert Flannery & LaDuca, LLP since 2003, where she leads the firm's lobbying and public policy practice. She is a consumer rights advocate who has testified before Congress over fifty times. Gilbert serves as the Executive Director and Legislative Counsel for the Committee to Support the Antitrust Laws (COSAL), an organization that supports antitrust legislation.

== Early career and education ==
Gilbert graduated magna cum laude from Tufts University with a B.A. in Mathematics in 1980 and received her J.D. from New York University School of Law in 1984, where she was a Root-Tilden scholar.

After law school, Gilbert served as Consumer Program Director at the U.S. Public Interest Research Group from 1984 to 1989, focusing on consumer protection issues, including leading efforts for congressional enactment of legislation to protect children from toxic art supplies. From 1989 to 1994, she was Legislative Director and later Executive Director of Public Citizen's Congress Watch, a Washington-based consumer advocacy organization.

== Public service ==
Gilbert served as Executive Director of the U.S. Consumer Product Safety Commission (CPSC) from 1995 to 2001, overseeing a staff of approximately 500 and helping to increase the agency's funding by nearly 40 percent. In 2001 she became Chief Operating Officer of M&R Strategic Services, a national firm specializing in lobbying and public policy campaigns. In 2009, after the election of President Barack Obama, Gilbert led the Presidential Transition Team for the Consumer Product Safety Commission.

== Post-government career ==
Gilbert represented the National Association of Shareholder and Consumer Attorneys to oppose efforts in Congress to change the rules for bringing class action lawsuits. Gilbert subsequently represented the Center for Justice & Democracy, opposing efforts in Congress to impose federal government restrictions on malpractice laws.

In 2010, Gilbert was appointed to the board of directors of the AAI (American Antitrust Institute).

On behalf of Consumers for Auto Reliability and Safety (CARS), Gilbert led a successful lobbying effort to pass a federal law prohibiting rental car companies from renting or selling recalled cars until they are repaired. President Obama on December 4, 2015 signed into law the "Raechel and Jacqueline Houck Safe Rental Car Act" (H.R. 2198, S. 1173) as part of the Fixing America's Surface Transportation Act (FAST Act).

In September 2023, the American Antitrust Institute announced Gilbert as the 2023 inductee to the Private Antitrust Enforcement Hall of Fame, acknowledging her significant contributions to antitrust enforcement.

== Writings ==
In 2008, Gilbert wrote a chapter entitled "Consumer Product Safety Commission: Safety First" for Change for America: A Progressive Blueprint for the 44th President, published by the Center for American Progress and the New Democracy Project.

In 2010, Gilbert authored a chapter in Materials on Tort Reform by Professor Andrew Popper of the Washington College of Law at American University.

In 2012, Gilbert co-authored with Victoria Romanenko a chapter in Private Enforcement of the Antitrust Laws in the United States (edited by Albert A. Foer and Randy M. Stutz).

== Controversy ==
In 2001, Gilbert stepped down as executive director of the Consumer Product Safety Commission (CPSC) after President Bush sparked a constitutional controversy by seeking to replace the leadership of the Commission, citing his powers under Article Two of the United States Constitution. Later, in 2008, Gilbert was mentioned as a possible appointee by President Barack Obama to be Chairman of the Commission. However, her nomination was criticized on the grounds that while she was executive director of the CPSC, the agency was known for its "strident enforcement efforts" contrary to large business interests.

== Personal life ==
Gilbert is married to Charles Lewis, former Professor of Journalism at American University, founder of the Center for Public Integrity, and a former producer for 60 Minutes. They have two children.

== See also ==
- Cuneo Gilbert & LaDuca, LLP
- U.S. Consumer Product Safety Commission
