= James M. Brady =

American journalist

- Education: American University School of Communication
- Occupations: Journalist, entrepreneur
- Writing career
- Subject: Digital journalism
- Notable works: Founder TBD.com (Defunct), General Manager TBD (2009-2010), Executive Editor of the washingtonpost.com (2004-2009), Editor-in-Chief of Digital First Media (2011-2014), President of Online News Association

James M. Brady, known as Jim Brady, is an American journalist and a pioneer in digital journalism. He is known for various roles over the years as a Programming Director at AOL, Executive Editor of the washingtonpost.com, General Manager at the since defunct TBD.com, Editor-in-Chief of Digital First Media, and president of the Online News Association.

Currently he is the CEO of Spirited Media, a mobile-focused hyperlocal news firm. Their initial platform, known as Billy Penn (named after Pennsylvania founder William Penn) was launched in 2014.

== Early life ==
Brady was born in Queens, New York City and grew up in Huntington, New York. He graduated from American University with a degree in journalism from the American University School of Communication in 1989.

== Career ==
Brady began his career as a sportswriter at the Post in 1987 and then also served the newspaper in several other capacities such as a sports editor, and managing news editor. He also was the sports editor for the Washingtonpost.com website when it was launched in April 1995.

In November 2004 he became the Executive Editor of the washingtonpost.com, a position which he kept until he stood down in December 2008.

He has also worked for America Online, UPI, Newsday and NBC Sports.
