= Jonathan Cuneo =

American lawyer (1952–2023)

- Born: September 10, 1952; New York City, New York, U.S.
- Died: July 26, 2023 (aged 70); Martha's Vineyard, Massachusetts, U.S.
- Education: Columbia University (BA); Cornell University (JD)
- Occupation: Attorney
- Employer: Cuneo Gilbert & LaDuca, LLP
- Spouse: Mara Liasson
- Father: Ernest Cuneo

Jonathan W. Cuneo (September 10, 1952 – July 26, 2023) was an American lawyer who represented clients in state and federal litigation and in government relations in the fields of antitrust, civil and human rights, consumer protection, corporate governance and securities for over three decades.

Cuneo was a partner of the law firm Cuneo Gilbert & LaDuca, LLP, a government servant, an affiliate of national legal oversight institutions, and a contributor to many legal publications. He received the highest Martindale-Hubbell Peer Review Rating of AV.

== Early life and education ==
Jonathan W. Cuneo was the son of Margaret Watson Cuneo, a member of the British Intelligence in World War II, and Ernest Cuneo, a lawyer, newspaperman, former National Football League player and aide to Fiorello LaGuardia. Ernest Cuneo also served as an intelligence liaison between Office of Strategic Services chief William Donovan and Sir William Stephenson, who headed British Intelligence.

Cuneo earned a Bachelor of Arts degree from Columbia University and his Juris Doctor from Cornell Law School, following which he clerked for Judge Edward Tamm of the U.S. Court of Appeals for the District of Columbia Circuit until 1978.

== Career ==
After completing his clerkship, he worked as an attorney in the Office of the General Counsel of the Federal Trade Commission until 1981.

=== Government service ===
Subsequent to his tenure at the FTC, Cuneo served as assistant counsel and then counsel to the Subcommittee on Monopolies and Commercial Law of the United States House Committee on the Judiciary. There, Cuneo counseled Congressman and Committee Chairman Peter W. Rodino regarding many antitrust issues. He also assisted in the Committee's consideration of potential budget-balancing amendments to the United States Constitution in 1982. He conducted a large-scale committee investigation and successfully advocated for oversight of the insurance industry.

From 1986, Cuneo served as General Counsel and Legislative Representative to the Committee to Support Antitrust Laws ("COSAL"). He also co-founded the National Association of Securities and Commercial Law Attorneys ("NASCAT") in 1988, and served as its general counsel from 1988 until 2004.

=== Litigation ===
==== Joe Camel Case ====
Cuneo served as Washington counsel in the first case to challenge the Joe Camel cigarette advertising campaign. The action was filed in California state court in 1991 well before the U.S. Attorney General began tobacco litigation. This litigation led to the release of documents that revealed R.J. Reynolds Tobacco Company had studied under-aged smokers with a view toward selling cigarettes and consequently induced youths to start smoking through targeted advertising. Congressman Henry Waxman called Cuneo and his colleagues "American Heroes" for their release of these documents.

==== Enron ====
Cuneo served as Washington counsel on behalf of defrauded investors in Enron from 2002 through 2008. This Enron Securities Litigation recovered over $7 billion, the largest in the history of federal securities litigation.

==== Hungarian Gold Train ====
Cuneo's firm, Cuneo Gilbert & LaDuca, LLP, successfully represented Hungarian Holocaust survivors seeking restitution and an accounting against the United States government in the Hungarian Gold Train case, which was settled for $25.5 million in 2005 after nearly five years of litigation. The settlement's terms also included an apology from the Bush Administration for the conduct of the U.S. Army.

==== Metromail ====
Cuneo's firm brought a path-breaking class action suit against Metromail for privacy violations surrounding supermarket questionnaires. After a woman in Ohio received a sexually suggestive letter from a maximum security inmate in Texas, it came to light that the company had subcontracted for Texas prisoners to "key" the questionnaire information. Cuneo's firm settled the case for significant injunctive relief, and a cash pool of $15 million was made available to victims.

==== Prudential ====
Cuneo's firm represented individual claimants against Prudential Insurance Company in post-settlement proceedings after a class action charging that Prudential had abused policyholders through deceptive sales practices. Over a period of eighteen months, his firm oversaw approximately 55,000 arbitration-like proceeding in this $4 billion settlement.

=== Controversy ===
Working for the plaintiff's securities bar, Cuneo was the lead lobbyist opposing passage of the Private Securities Litigation Reform Act in 1995. Although the coalition Cuneo led was unsuccessful in preventing passage of the bill, some of its more extreme provisions were defeated as the Supreme Court recognized in Amgen v. Connecticut Retirement Plans and Trust Funds (2013). After President Bill Clinton vetoed the bill in December 1995, Congress overruled that veto, the only veto override of the Clinton Presidency.

=== Authorship ===
Cuneo authored numerous pieces in newspapers and professional journals, including The New York Times, Yale Human Rights & Development Law Journal, Georgetown Law Journal, The George Washington Law Review, The Nation, and the Legal Times. He was the co-editor of The International Handbook on Private Enforcement of Competition Law, published in the U.S. in January 2011.

== Awards ==
- Cuneo was elected as a member of the American Law Institute in 2021.
- Cuneo was named a Fellow of the Litigation Counsel of America.

== Personal life and death ==
Cuneo was married to Mara Liasson, the national political reporter for NPR and political contributor to Fox News. He boxed recreationally for fifteen years and was a collegiate and club competitive heavyweight oarsman and club rugby player.

Jonathan Cuneo died from melanoma on July 26, 2023, at the age of 70.

== See also ==
- Joe Camel Case
- House Committee on the Judiciary
