= Steven Rosenbaum =

American entrepreneur and filmmaker (born 1961)

Steven J. Rosenbaum
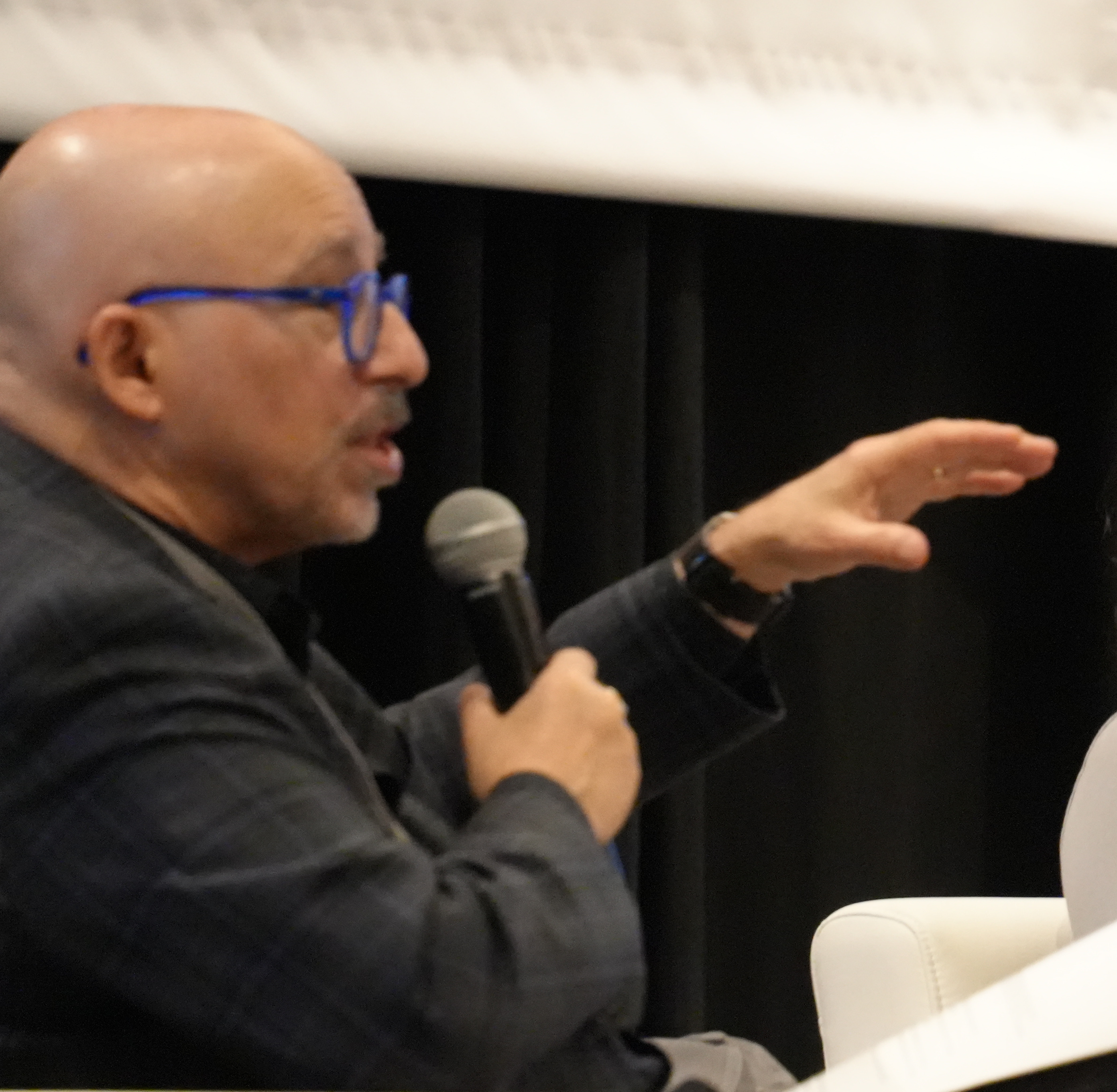
- Born: New York, New York, U.S.
- Education: BA Skidmore College, MA NYU Gallatin
- Occupations: Entrepreneur, filmmaker, author
- Employer: Sustainable Media Center

Steven J. Rosenbaum is an American author, entrepreneur and filmmaker. He was a Resident at TED in New York City and holds two patents in the areas of video curation and advertising technology. Rosenbaum is the co-founder and executive director of the Sustainable Media Center.

After the September 11, 2001, attacks, documentary filmmaker Steven Rosenbaum dispatched crews around the city and placed a classified ad in the Village Voice, inviting New Yorkers to contribute video footage as a way to "contribute to history.” He later chose the New York Public Library as the archive’s permanent home to ensure free, uncensored public access. Rosenbaum hopes future generations will continue to discover new and surprising meanings within it.

He was an executive director of the NYC Media Lab from 2020 to 2022.

== Career ==
Rosenbaum founded Broadcast News Network (BNN). He also acted as the company's executive producer for the company's main program Broadcast New York. In 1991 the show was awarded a New York Regional Emmy for "Outstanding Magazine Format Programming", and "Outstanding Issues Programming - Segments". Later, Rosenbaum was nominated for a national Emmy Award for "Exceptional Merit in Nonfiction Filmmaking" for the film With All Deliberate Speed'

In 1995, he created MTV News: Unfiltered; a half-hour show on MTV featuring first-person stories provided by viewers and curated by the show's producers. The show would typically feature content not covered by traditional media and was the first commercial use of UGC, User-Generated Content.

In 2001, while working on a shoot for Animal Planet, he witnessed the 9/11 attacks on the World Trade Center. He directed his five film crews to Manhattan to capture the aftermath of the attacks. This footage would later become the documentary 7 Days in September (winner of CINE Golden Eagle and Telly Award) and go on to become a research archive of amateur video known as The CameraPlanet Archive The 500 Hours of 9/11) which Rosenbaum donated to the National 9/11 Memorial Museum.

Later in 2001, he launched CameraPlanet.com; a web-based video shop that created television content and encouraged users to create their own content by providing them with tips on how to tell their own story. The site featured many categories like “beaches” and “pets” and each video featured about four minutes of footage created entirely by the users.

In 2005, he was nominated for an Emmy Award for Exceptional Merit in Nonfiction Filmmaking for his work in "With All Deliberate Speed" for the Discovery Channel. The documentary, which was released to coincide with the 50th anniversary of the U.S. Supreme Court's Brown v. Board of Education ruling of 1954, examines via newsreel footage and interviews the events that led to the landmark decision.

In 2006, he founded Magnify.net, a New York-based startup focused on developing a video aggregation and curation platform. The company spent seven years building a steady business providing tools to enterprise clients who wished to manage and curate their own channels of video content.

In 2013 Magnify acquired Waywire, a video-sharing website founded by U.S. Senator Cory Booker. In April 2014, Magnify.net adopted the Waywire name for its existing enterprise software business. One of the main objectives of the acquisition was to build a consumer-facing business around the curation of videos online.

In 2019, Rosenbaum joined the NYC Media Lab, a consortium of university partners focused on media innovation. He was promoted to executive director in 2020. In 2022 he founded The Sustainable Media Center, whose mission is to improve media sustainability.

Rosenbaum has also acted as a Member of the Social Media Week: New York advisory board, as a Member of the FASTPACK 200 and was also named the first-Ever Entrepreneur at Large for the New York City Economic Development Corporation, offering his expertise as an author and curator to help startup businesses in the New York Area grow and develop.

Rosenbaum is a frequent writer for websites including MediaPost, Forbes, The Huffington Post and The Columbia Journalism Review.

On May 19, 2026, the New York Times reported that Rosenbaum's book The Future of Truth, an analysis of "the effects of artificial intelligence on truth... included numerous made-up or misattributed quotes concocted by A.I."

== Patents ==
Rosenbaum has two patents in the areas of video curation and advertising technology. A year after YouTube was founded, Rosenbaum filed Patent No. 8,117,545 "Hosted video discovery and publishing platform" which was granted in 2012. And in 2014 Patent No. 208,812,956 "Video curation platform with pre-roll advertisements for discovered content."

== Controversy ==
Rosenbaum has admitted to using AI chatbots in the creation of his most recent book, The Future of Truth: How AI Reshapes Reality (Simon & Schuster, 2026). While the use is acknowledged in the book, it has been reported that there are multiple mis-attributed and non-existent quotes in the book. Rosenbaum later claimed the errors were due to hallucinations of these chatbots he used during the writing process. Reporting by The Atlantic concludes, "The scandal can't just be that [Rosenbaum] used AI while working on his book, because he acknowledged that up front. He got in trouble because he had used AI badly, failing to check its work on a task at which it is famously unreliable."

== Filmography ==
As a producer

- 1995: MTV News: Unfiltered – TV series documentary; executive producer
- 1996: Investigative Reports – TV series; executive producer; 3 episodes
- 1997: 48 Hours – TV series documentary; executive producer; 1 episode
- 2000: MSNBC Investigates – TV series documentary; executive producer; 1 episode
- 2001: I-Witness – TV series documentary; executive producer; 2003
- 2002: Facing Arthur – documentary short; executive producer
- 2002: 7 Days in September – documentary; executive producer
- 2002: Dog Days – TV Mini-Series documentary; executive producer
- 2002: Strictly Personal – TV series; executive producer; 2002–2003
- 2004: Staffers – TV series documentary; executive producer
- 2004: With All Deliberate Speed – documentary; executive producer
- 2006: God Grew Tired of Us – documentary; executive producer

As a director

- 2002: Doctors' Diaries – TV series documentary
- 2002: 7 Days in September – documentary
- 2002: Dog Days – TV mini-series documentary
- 2003: Journalists: Killed in the Line of Duty – TV movie documentary
- 2004: Staffers – TV series documentary
- 2021: The Outsider – documentary; director; executive producer

== Publications ==
- Peer-to-Peer Video: The Economics, Policy, and Culture of Today's New Mass Medium (Springer, 2008)
- Curation Nation (McGraw Hill, 2011)
- Curate This (2014)
- The Future of Truth: How AI Reshapes Reality (Simon & Schuster, 2026)
