= The Future of Truth (Rosenbaum book) =

2026 non-fiction book

The Future of Truth: How AI Reshapes Reality
- Author: Steven Rosenbaum; Maria Ressa (foreword)
- Language: English
- Subject: Artificial intelligence
- Publisher: Matt Holt Books, Simon & Schuster
- Publication date: May 12, 2026
- Pages: 288
- ISBN: 9781637749104
- Website: thefutureoftruth.us

The Future of Truth: How AI Reshapes Reality is a 2026 book by American filmmaker and author Steven Rosenbaum about how artificial intelligence affects the concept of truth. It was published by Matt Holt Books on May 12, 2026, to positive media attention; on May 19, in response to an inquiry from The New York Times, Rosenbaum acknowledged that the book itself contains multiple misattributed or false quotes that were hallucinated by AIs.

== Development ==
Rosenbaum has said that he developed the book using AI chatbots as research tools, indicating in his notes what information came from AI and sending those claims to a fact-checker affiliated with the publisher. He has said that he did not use AI tools to write the book itself. He has described AI tools as "a delightful writing companion ... strangely creative and crafty and unusual in all these ways", while acknowledging that sometimes "then it betrays you in ways that are just really quite horrible".

Journalist and Nobel laureate Maria Ressa wrote the book's foreword. Taylor Lorenz, Michael Wolff, and Nicholas Thompson wrote blurbs promoting it.

== Release and reception ==
The Future of Truth was published by Matt Holt Books, an imprint of BenBella Books, and distributed by Simon & Schuster. The book's release on May 12, 2026, was described by Futurism as "buzzy" and by The New York Times as "to great fanfare". On May 14, an excerpt was published in Wired under the title "Gen Z Is Pioneering a New Understanding of Truth".

On May 17, the Times contacted Rosenbaum regarding a number of quotes that appeared to be falsified or misattributed; the following evening he confirmed that they were the result of AI hallucinations:

As I disclosed in the book's acknowledgments, I used AI tools ChatGPT and Claude during the research, writing and editing process. That does not excuse these errors, of which I take full responsibility. I am now working with the editors to thoroughly review and quickly correct any affected passages; any future editions will be corrected.

The Times documented several of the errors, including a quote from Kara Swisher that Swisher described as making it "sound like I have a stick up my butt" and a quote from Lisa Feldman Barrett that Barrett described as misrepresenting her views on the nature of emotions, social signals, and truth. The book also misattributed a quote by Meredith Broussard from an interview with Marketplace Tech as having been from her book Artificial Unintelligence and hallucinated several words in a quote from Lee McIntyre, although according to McIntyre it did not misrepresent his views. Wired's editors, in an addendum to the excerpt they published, said that all quotes included in it had been verified as part of their fact-checking process.

Rosenbaum told the Times that the series of errors "serves as a warning about the risks of AI-assisted research and verification, that is why I wrote the book. These AI errors do not, in fact, diminish the larger questions that the book raises about truth, trust and AI and its impact on society, democracy and editorial." Maggie Harrison Dupré in Futurism expressed skepticism, writing "The risk of AI hallucinations ... is well-known. If you're going to literally write the book on post-AI truth, you should probably put some more elbow grease into fact-checking your AI-assisted research." Kyle Orland in Ars Technica, responding to Rosenbaum's statement that his error "demonstrates the problem more vividly than any abstract argument could", was similarly skeptical, writing that "if we accept this take, every avoidably obvious mess in the world might be a disguised good because it really helps illuminate the huge mistake. And that can't be right; sometimes 'negligence' is just that." Subsequent comments by Rosenbaum placed more blame on the chatbots, which he told The Atlantic "fucked up the book".

Rosenbaum told Ars Technica that fact-checking occurred "incredibly effectively, but not a hundred percent"; Orland observed that "it's worth noting that most writers manage to include zero made-up quotes when they write a book". Rosenbaum said that he had "learned a lesson" and would be "much more suspicious" of AI in the future, but would continue to use AI in his research. Orland responded to Rosenbaum's characterization of AI as "magical" by comparing it to the One Ring from The Lord of the Rings, in that it "convinces many of those who use it that they can control its power properly" when many cannot. Orland highlighted the limits of traditional fact-checking regarding AI, given that fact-checkers are used to assuming that direct quotes are copied word-for-word from the source. Rosenbaum told Orland that the future of fact-checking for AI-researched works "probably includes mandatory source tracing for quotations, better provenance tracking, clearer standards around AI-assisted research, and potentially (more irony here) AI tools that audit citations against primary materials".

As we delve deeper into the mechanisms of misinformation, it's essential to understand how it not only proliferates but also profits.

— A quote alleged by Will Oremus to be AI-written, which Rosenbaum denies

Patrick Redford in Defector criticized Rosenbaum, alongside other artists tricked by AI, for failing to recognize AI as "the enemy". Will Oremus in The Atlantic described Redford's approach of stigmatizing AI writing as "reasonable", noting the presence of low-quality, seemingly AI-generated verbiage in The Future of Truth—a claim denied by Rosenbaum—before saying that the greater issue is finding the line at which AI assistance in writing becomes a problem. Oremus concluded, "The scandal can't just be that [Rosenbaum] used AI while working on his book, because he acknowledged that up front. He got in trouble because he had used AI badly, failing to check its work on a task at which it is famously unreliable."

== See also ==
- Shy Girl, a 2026 horror novel written or heavily rewritten with generative AI
