= McKinley Building =

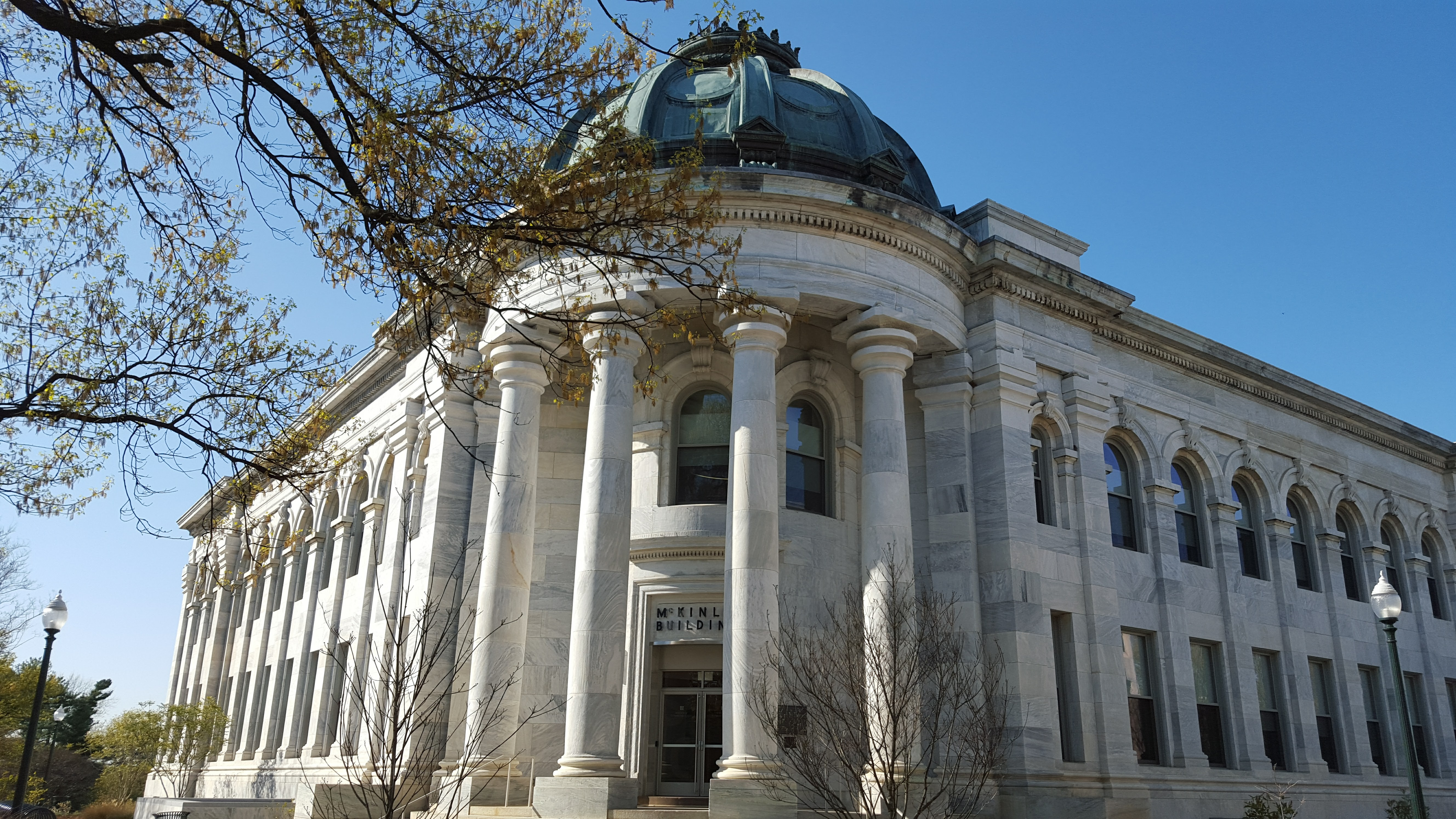
- The McKinley Building in 2016

- Location within District of Columbia McKinley Building (the United States)

General information
- Location: Washington, D.C.
- Coordinates: 38°56′11″N 77°5′22″W
- Current tenants: American University School of Communication
- Named for: William McKinley
- Groundbreaking: 1901
- Completed: 1907
- Owner: American University

Design and construction
- Architect: Henry Ives Cobb

The McKinley Building was the second building constructed on the American University campus, built in 1907, in northwest Washington, D.C. McKinley was designed by Henry Ives Cobb, well known for his architectural work in Chicago. The McKinley Building became the new home for the School of Communication after renovations were completed in 2014.

== Construction ==
Henry Ives Cobb designed a number of buildings on the American University campus including the future McKinley Building (then called the Ohio Hall of Government).

Excavation commenced in 1901 to prepare for a cornerstone laying ceremony in December of that year. The combination of President William McKinley's assassination on September 14, 1901, and the threat of unfavorable weather conditions delayed the cornerstone laying until 1902. In honor of the role of the late President McKinley both in the world and at the school, the founders of American University decided to change the name of Ohio Hall to The McKinley Memorial-Ohio College of Government. The American University Courier said of the building, "Every footfall in its halls for the years to come would echo the name and fame of the great and honored man in whose memory the building was erected." On May 14, 1902, 1,500 people attended the cornerstone laying of the McKinley Memorial-Ohio College of Government. President Theodore Roosevelt did the honors.

In October 1905, construction commenced on McKinley Building. Contractors Richardson & Burgess estimates the building construction cost at $250,000. Exterior construction completed December 11, 1907 with a cost of $145,000. Overall construction is incomplete, with the interior unfinished, and was put on hold due to a lack of funds from American University.

== World War I ==
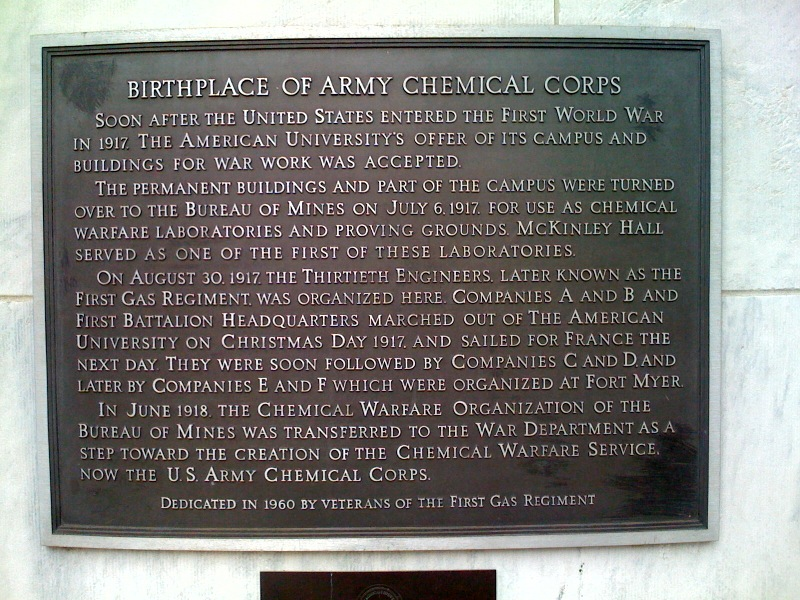
This sign commemorates the establishment of the U.S. Army Chemical Corps in June 1918.

April 2, 1917 the United States officially declared war on Germany and entered World War I. American University entered into an agreement with the U.S. government to use the university campus and the McKinley building for war purposes. Camp Leach with acres of barracks was created on campus and the McKinley building was to be turned over to the Bureau of Mines after completion of the interior, renovations which the government paid for. The U.S. modified and finished the interior of McKinley Building, creating the chemical weapons lab, one of the biggest in the nation.

The 30th Engineer Regiment (Gas and Flame), later to become 1st Gas Regiment, was activated at Camp Leach on August 15, 1917.

Major General WM. L. Sibert expressed gratitude to AU on behalf of the Chemical Warfare Service for the use of the campus during World War I. The Chemical Warfare Service left the American University campus July 1, 1919.

== Postwar ==
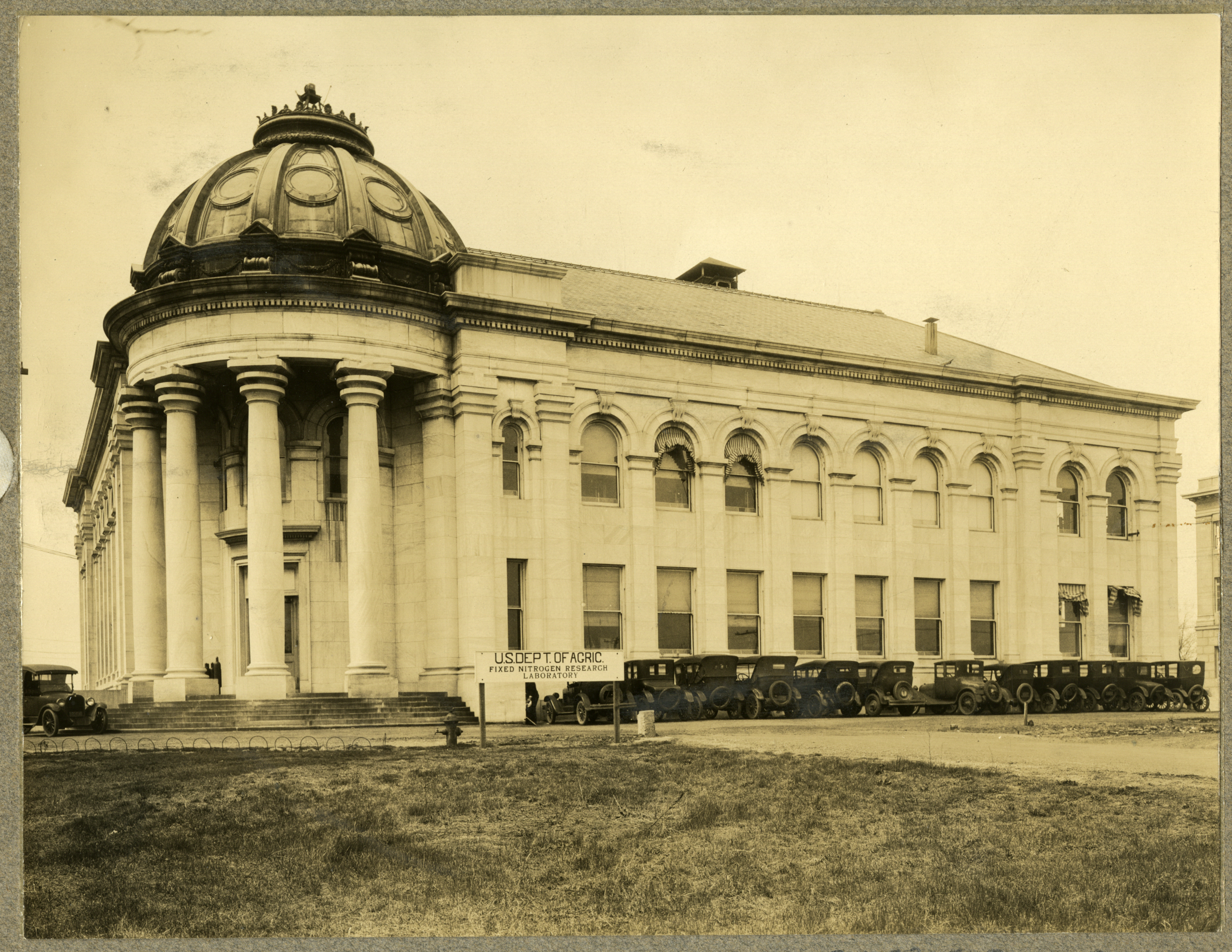
1926

The United States Department of Agriculture leased McKinley for the use of the Nitrate Division (which later became the Fixed Nitrogen Research Laboratory). The Lab, in April 1920, employed 108 persons to study Nitrogen in the Atmosphere and its potential usage in fertilizer. The Fixed Nitrogen Research Laboratory remained in the McKinley Building until March 15, 1941.

The Chesapeake and Potomac Telephone Company took over occupation of McKinley. $40,000 worth of renovations were done to the building. C & P Telephone Company occupy the building from October 28, 1941, to 1954. C & P pays the school some $48,000/yr rental until vacating the premises.

== Academic building ==
McKinley was renovated in 1955 and opened for academic use for the fall 1955 term. The renovations accommodated classrooms and offices and marked the beginning of the building's use as an academic building, rather than as a rental to external parties.

Renovation made way for The School of Business, The American Language Center, The District Speech Clinic, and The Education Department.

=== Mistrust ===
An exploration of the attic chronicled in an article in The Eagle published Nov. 15, 1966 revealed that a portion of the bare, unused space holds "a maze of telephone wires" and "a complex of electronic equipment." This discovery by the university paper sparks a student-led uproar that carries forward as far as 1970. An article in The Eagle written in September 1967 quoting the AU Director of Physical Plant clarifies that the receivers are backup Federal Transmitters. An editorial written later in the same paper questions, "what AU's involvement with the government actually is." This mistrust eventually leads to the equipment quietly being removed in November 1967.

April 7, 1970 rocks thrown at McKinley broke windows as a rally got out of hand. A firebomb thrown into a biology lab did not go off.

== Restoration ==
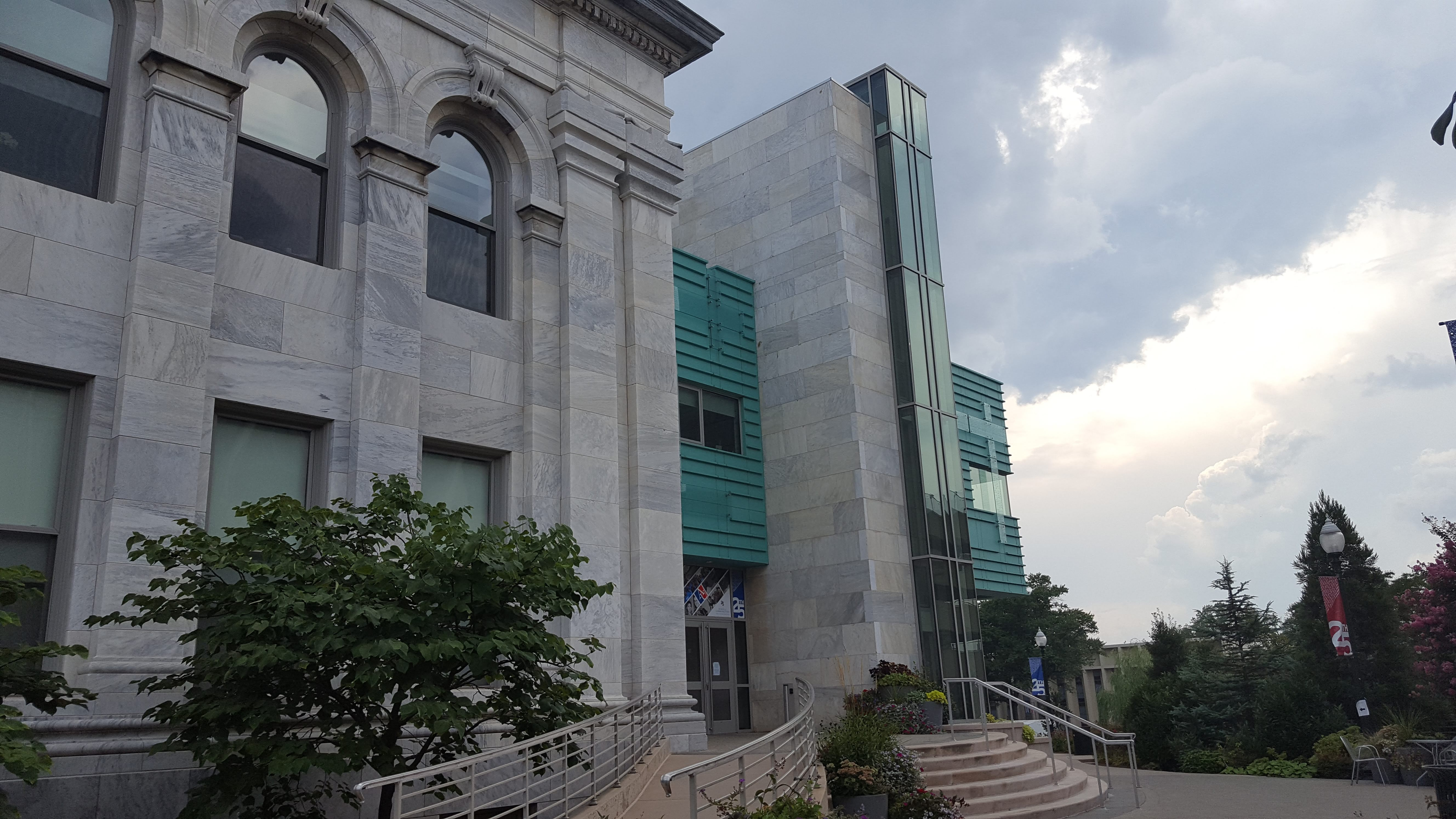
Newly remodeled north side entrance

=== School of Communication ===
A quick tour of the new and improved McKinley Building on American University's campus.

McKinley is the new home of the American University School of Communication. Groundbreaking for restoration and construction took place in 2012 and opened for classes in January 2014.

The renovation and expansion was designed by DLR group. The general contractor was GCS-SIGAL.
