= Cuneo Gilbert Flannery & LaDuca =

American law firm

Cuneo Gilbert & LaDuca, LLP
- Headquarters: Washington, D.C.
- No. of offices: 5
- Key people: Jonathan Cuneo (Founding Partner), Pamela B. Gilbert, & Charles LaDuca
- Date founded: 1986 (as Cuneo Law Group, PC)
- Founder: Jonathan Cuneo
- Company type: Limited Liability Partnership
- Website: cuneolaw.com

Cuneo Gilbert Flannery & LaDuca, LLP is a law firm with offices in Washington, D.C., New York City, St. Louis, Nashville, and Minneapolis.

The firm was founded by Jonathan Cuneo, who was known as a plaintiff's lawyer in class action, price-fixing and antitrust lawsuits. The firm added Michael Flannery as a name partner in 2026, changing the firm name to Cuneo Gilbert Flannery & LaDuca.

== Cases ==
The firm served as Washington counsel in Mangini v. RJ Reynolds Tobacco Co., a case filed in San Francisco arguing that Joe Camel, a cartoon caricature known for smoking a cigarette in a pool hall, was equivalent to an animated children's cartoon and encouraged children to take up smoking. The suit did not result in any judgment or settlement, but it ruled that federal law does not block state lawsuits trying to stop tobacco advertising targeting minors.

The firm was one of three Class Counsel appointed by the court in the Hungarian Gold Train Case, which argued that U.S. Army occupation forces mishandled a shipment of Nazi gold that had been stolen from Hungarian Jews. The US government agreed to pay up to $25.5 million into a settlement fund.

== Antitrust ==
The firm's Michael Flannery is a lead attorney for the "commercial buyer plaintiffs" in In Re Turkey Antitrust Litigation, which accuses suppliers of fixing prices of turkey products. The case was filed in 2019 and in 2025 a $4 million agreement between Cargill and the indirect purchaser class was approved. Cargill agreed to a $32 million settlement with direct buyers. The plaintiffs have also secured a $4.62 million settlement with Tyson.

The firm represents indirect reseller plaintiffs in the generic drug price-fixing litigation, which alleges that generic manufacturers coordinated to raise prices across a wide range of medications. In August 2026, Sandoz agreed to pay $450 million to resolve claims brought by a coalition of state enforcers, and a federal judge set a February trial date in the states' case.

Cuneo Gilbert Flannery & LaDuca serves as Co-Lead Class Counsel in the Fire Apparatus Antitrust MDL. The case alleges that fire apparatus manufacturers conspired to fix prices and restrict supply, forcing municipalities to pay inflated costs, hold onto aging fleets, and redirect funds from other public services.

== Government affairs ==
The firm represents the Writers Guild of America, East and West, in litigation challenging Paramount Skydance's proposed acquisition of Warner Bros. Discovery. The complaint, filed in California federal court in July 2026, alleges that the transaction would harm screenwriters by concentrating the market for their work.

In July 2026, the firm served as lead counsel for a group of Division I student-athletes who filed a putative class action against the National Collegiate Athletic Association in the U.S. District Court for the District of Colorado, Wisne v. National Collegiate Athletic Association, No. 1:26-cv-03063. The suit challenged the NCAA's revised age-based eligibility framework, adopted in June 2026, alleging that it violated federal antitrust law by denying a fifth season of competition to athletes who had enrolled in 2022 and exhausted four years of eligibility, while extending that season to later cohorts. Firm partner Robert Shelquist represented the plaintiffs.

On July 31, 2026, Judge Charlotte N. Sweeney certified a nationwide class and issued a preliminary injunction requiring the NCAA to grant the affected athletes a fifth year of eligibility. The NCAA appealed, and on August 21, 2026, a panel of the U.S. Court of Appeals for the Tenth Circuit stayed the injunction in a 2–1 decision, reinstating the eligibility rule pending resolution of the appeal.
