= 935 Lies =

2014 book by Charles Lewis

- Author: Charles Lewis
- Language: English
- Subject: Social Science, Media Studies, Language Arts, Journalism, Political Science, Civics
- Published: 2014 (PublicAffairs)
- Publication place: United States
- Media type: Print
- Pages: 392
- ISBN: 9781610391177
- OCLC: 881385984
- Text: 935 Lies at the book publisher's website

935 Lies: The Future of Truth and the Decline of America's Moral Integrity is a book written by investigative journalist Charles Lewis, published by PublicAffairs in 2014, as an exploration of the many ways truth is manipulated by governments and corporations. The title is a reference to the number of times the George W. Bush and seven top officials of his administration lied to the American public about the national security threat posed by Iraq prior to the 2003 invasion.

== Media attention ==
The Wall Street Journal said the book was "one of the toughest critiques of television news ever written by an insider".

Lewis appeared on the June 27, 2014, episode of Moyers & Company.
