= American University School of International Service =

International relations school of American University

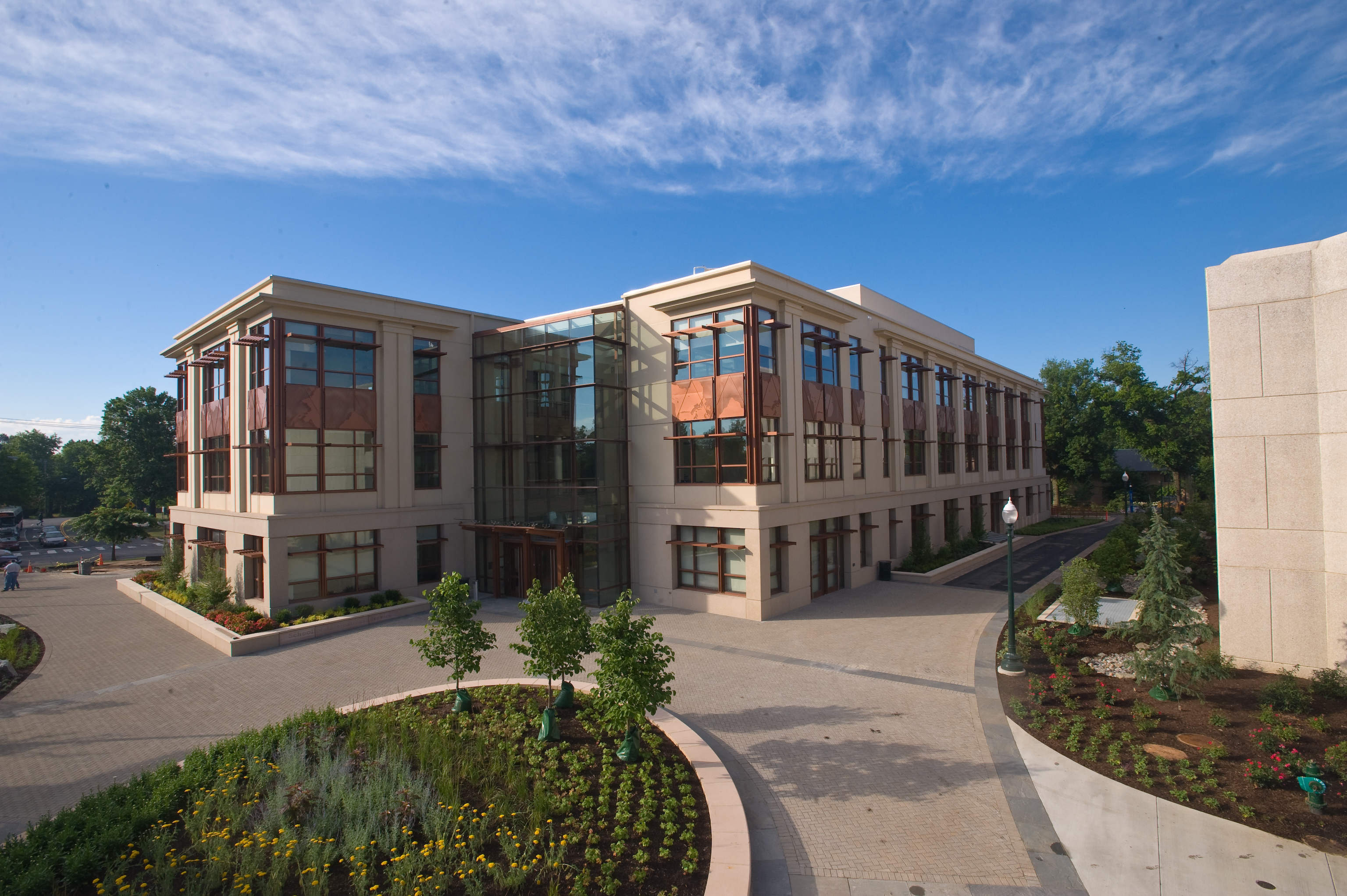
- Type: Private
- Established: 1957
- Parent institution: American University
- Affiliations: APSIA
- Dean: Rachel Sullivan Robinson, PhD
- Students: 2,000+
- Location: Washington, D.C., United States; 38.9361°N 77.088°W
- Campus: Urban
- Website: american.edu/sis

The School of International Service (SIS) is American University's school of advanced international study, covering areas such as international politics, international communication, international development, international economics, peace and conflict resolution, international law and human rights, global environmental politics, and U.S. foreign policy.

The School of International Service was established in 1957 and has an alumni network of over 25,000. SIS enrolls more than 2,000 students. The School of International Service consistently ranks highly among international relations programs. SIS is a member of the Association of Professional Schools of International Affairs. SIS also has partnerships with schools such as the Balsillie School of International Affairs.

== History ==
The founding of schools of international affairs was urged by President Dwight D. Eisenhower during the height of the Cold War. His initiative called together thirteen University presidents, including AU's Hurst Robins Anderson, encouraging them to create human-focused international affairs programs dedicated to preparing practitioners for foreign policy beyond the U.S.–Soviet rivalry. In response, SIS was founded with the mission to establish a school based on service to the global community. In 1958, the school admitted its first full-time class, replacing AU's Department of International Relations. The class consisted of 85 students representing 36 countries.

In 1967, SIS added its International Communications program, the first such program offered by an American university. In 1981 SIS inaugurated the Ibn Khaldun Chair of Islamic Studies to address concerns that American universities lacked an appropriate venue for exploring the greater Muslim-Western understanding. In the 1990s, SIS established dual degree programs with Ritsumeikan University in Kyoto, Japan, and Korea University in Seoul, South Korea. In 1991, SIS added the Center for the Global South, followed in 1995 by the addition of the Mohammed Said Farsi Chair in Islamic Peace, and in 2000 with a joint program on National Resources and Sustainable Development with the United Nations University for Peace. New degree options implemented in 2010 include the Global Scholars Program, a concentrated three-year B.A. program, an M.A. program in Social Enterprise, and, in partnership with the U.S. Peace Corps, a Master's International degree combining a Peace Corps assignment with SIS academic work.

=== New building ===
In 2004, plans were initiated for a new, 70,000-square-foot (6,500 m^{2}), academic building designed by architect William McDonough, which was completed in spring 2010. It is a LEED Gold-certified building, featuring 3,230 square feet (300 m^{2}) of photovoltaic solar panels, low-flow faucets to reduce water consumption, and three solar water heating systems.

== SIS publications ==
Clocks and Clouds is American University's undergraduate journal of international affairs.

The Journal of International Service is American University's graduate journal of international affairs.

Intercultural Management Quarterly is published by the Intercultural Management Institute, which provides customized training for effective communication, negotiation, and leadership across cultures.

== Academics ==
SIS rankings

World rankings
| Foreign Policy – Graduate Programs | 8th |

U.S. rankings
| Foreign Policy – Undergraduate Programs | 9th |

=== Bachelor's degrees ===
The School of International Service offers a Bachelor of Arts in International Studies. The school also allows undergraduate students to earn a minor in International Studies as well as undergraduate certificates in either European Studies and International Studies.

=== Master's degrees ===
The School of International Service offers the following master's degrees:

- Master of Science in Development Management
- Master of Arts in Ethics, Peace, and Human Rights
- Master of Arts in Global Environmental Policy
- Master of Arts in International Affairs (with a concentration in Comparative and Regional Studies; Global Governance, Politics, and Security; International Economic Relations; Natural Resources and Sustainable Development; or United States Foreign Policy and National Security)
- Master of Arts in International Affairs Policy and Analysis
- Master of Arts in Intercultural and International Communication
- Master of Arts in International Development
- Master of Arts in International Economics Relations
- Master of Arts in International Economics Relations: Quantitative Methods
- Master of Arts in International Peace and Conflict Resolution
- Master of Arts in International Relations (only available online)
- Master of Arts in Social Enterprise

SIS also offers several combined degrees:

- Combined Bachelor of Arts/Master of Arts (BA/MA) (for current American University undergraduate students only)
- Juris Doctor/Master of Arts in International Affairs (with a concentration in International Affairs) (with American's Washington College of Law)
- Master of Arts in International Affairs/Master of Business Administration
- Master of Arts in International Peace and Conflict Resolution/Master of Arts in Teaching
- Master of Arts International Peace and Conflict Resolution/Master of Theological Studies
- Dual Master of Arts in Natural Resources and Sustainable Development (with the University for Peace)

The school also has programs with Ritsumeikan University, Korea University, and Sookmyung University. Information on dual-degree, semester, or summer/intersession study abroad programs are available on the Office of International Programs website.

=== Ph.D. program ===
The Ph.D. program in International Relations at SIS prepares students for careers as teachers and scholars at universities and research institutes in the private and public sectors. Ph.D. field concentrations include Development Studies; Global Environment; Global Governance & International Organizations; Peace & Conflict Resolution; Political Violence; Security; Technology, Culture & Social Change; and United States Foreign Policy and National Security.

=== Executive master's degree ===
In this program, experienced international affairs professionals are able to broaden their knowledge, enhance their intellectual development, expand their professional effectiveness, and strengthen their international leadership skills and knowledge. One can construct an individually tailored program of study from among the school's eight disciplines:

- Comparative and Regional Studies
- Global Environmental Politics
- International Communication
- International Development
- International Economic Relations
- International Politics and Foreign Policy
- International Peace and Conflict Resolution
- U.S. Foreign Policy

=== Graduate certificates ===
SIS Graduate Certificate Programs:

- Comparative and Regional Studies
- Cross-Cultural Communication
- European Studies
- Global Environmental Policy
- Global Information Technology
- International Arts Management
- International Communication
- International Economic Policy
- International Economic Relations
- International Peace and Conflict Resolution
- International Politics
- Peacebuilding
- The Americas
- United States Foreign Policy

=== Online Programs ===
American University's School of International Service offers two online international relations degrees:

- Master of Arts in International Relations (MAIR): Features live online classes and five concentrations, including Global Security, International Development, and International Negotiation and Conflict Resolution.
- Executive Master of International Service (MIS): Designed for professionals with seven or more years of experience in the fields of international affairs or international service.

== Research and learning centers ==
- ASEAN Studies Center
- Bridging the Gap
- Center for Latin American and Latino Studies
- Center for Global Peace
- Center for Research on Collaboratories and Technology Enhanced Learning Communities (COTELCO)
- Forum for Climate Engineering Assessment
- Institute on Disability and Public Policy
- Intercultural Management Institute
- International Affairs Research Institute
- Public International Law and Policy Program
- Transnational Challenges and Emerging Nations Dialogue
- US-Pakistan Women's Council

== Notable faculty ==
Notable current and former SIS faculty include:

- Mohammed Abu-Nimer – expert on conflict-resolution and the politics of the Middle East
- Amitav Acharya– UNESCO Chair in Transnational Challenges and Governance
- Akbar S. Ahmed – former Ambassador of Pakistan to the United Kingdom
- George Ayittey – President of the Free Africa Foundation; political economics professor
- Robert A. Blecker – economist specializing in macroeconomics and international trade theory
- Edmund Ghareeb – Lebanese-American scholar specializing in Middle East politics
- James Goldgeier – foreign policy scholar specializing in American foreign policy, including US-Russia relations
- Louis W. Goodman - international relations scholar, specializing in Latin America
- Frank William La Rue – UN Special Rapporteur and human rights scholar-activist
- Charles Malik – former president of the United Nations Economic and Social Council
- Renee Marlin-Bennett – expert on global political economy
- Hamid Mowlana – Iranian-American advisor and academic
- Orlando Letelier – Chilean economist and diplomat
- James H. Mittelman – expert on globalization and development
- Anthony C. E. Quainton – United States Ambassador to the Central African Empire, Kuwait, Nicaragua, and Peru; United States Coordinator for Counterterrorism
- Arturo C. Porzecanski – Distinguished Economist-in-Residence; Professor and Program Director of the MA in International Economic Relations; investor
- Andrew E. Rice – founder of the Society for International Development
- Susan Rice – the 24th United States National Security Advisor from 2013 to 2017 during the Barack Obama administration. She was formerly a U.S. diplomat, Brookings Institution fellow, and U.S. Ambassador to the United Nations. She served on the staff of the National Security Council and as Assistant Secretary of State for African Affairs during President Bill Clinton's second term.
- Abdul Aziz Said – foreign affairs scholar specializing in diplomacy Islamic world
- David J. Saposs – economist and historian; former chief economist of the National Labor Relations Board
- Cathy Schneider – author and professor of urban politics, comparative social movements, and criminal justice
- Stephen Silvia – scholar of international economics, international trade relations, and comparative politics (with emphasis on Germany and United States)
- Roger Tangri – British-American scholar of African politics
- Irene Tinker – expert on comparative global development; founding board president of the International Center for Research on Women
- Celeste A. Wallander – professor; specialist on military and energy in Russia/Eurasia region; member of the Council on Foreign Relations;
- Paul R. Williams – human rights lawyer and President of the Public International Law & Policy Group
- Ibram X. Kendi - scholar of race and discriminatory policy in America
- Earl Anthony Wayne - Formerly Assistant Secretary of State for Economic and Business Affairs and Ambassador to Argentina and Mexico
