= New constitutionalism =

New constitutionalism is derived from the classical neo-liberalism framework and represents a set of political policies that promote a new global order. The goal of new constitutionalism is to separate the democratic and economic practices by shifting economic aims from the regional and national level to the global level through constitutional framework. The purpose of this shift is to create global supremacy and promote a free capitalist system.

Central ideas of neoliberalism have been advanced to create policies and practices to achieve global governance. New constitutionalism provides power to the private realm and limits power of state governance and public corporations. The transferring of power creates an informal self-regulatory setting allowing for the dismissal of public scrutiny and transparency. New constitutionalism has reshaped the structure of control to allow “locking in” mechanisms to occur to prevent intervention from the democratic realm and to enhance economic objectives. This protects markets from regional interference and allows global influence in order to promote imperialism.

The development of new constitutionalism is the result of globalization and the growing need for global hegemony. Institutions have gained power in regards to trade, mobility, and flexibility through the framework of new constitutionalism. The World Trade Organization, International Monetary Fund, the North American Free Trade Agreement, and the European Union are all actors contributing to the power of global supremacy.

New constitutionalism as a political order emerged in the latter half of the 20th century and the term was coined by academic Stephen Gill. The need for economic constitutional change was the result of crisis in political order correspondingly to the Russian Revolution and the Cold War as well as the progress of globalization through technological means. Since then the disciplinary has grown in acceptance due to the 2008 financial crisis and the need for largescale stabilization in its aftermath. Theorists have subsequently developed the social and economic practices both in support and disagreement of the framework to provide a comparative outlook.

== Origins ==
New constitutionalism formed in the 1980s as the result of a growing world order and the “worldwide market revolution.” The end of the Cold War represented an ideological shift and the need for transformation. This shift was reiterated by Prime Minister Margaret Thatcher declaring the depletion of socialism and the rise of conservatism and liberalism. As society progressed it allowed for the evolution of capital mobility, transnational corporation and the expansion of the world market. The Great Depression and the aftermath of World War II reflected the need for reform. Reform would redirect economic and political practices, ensuring benefits for all through the creation of global institutions.

Neo-liberal supremacy through the dominance of the United States and the Soviet Union allowed for geopolitical reconfiguration increasing the need for new political order. Additionally the lack of consistency among nation-state principles and the constant interruption from democratic power influenced the need to provide sustainable long-term economic goals by limiting executive and legislative branches of government using constitutional framework. New constitutionalism has become prominent after the 2008 financial crisis as a result of the need to bypass formal trade rules and democratic controls.

== Framework ==
There are four main policies to define new constitutionalism. The first represents the development of a constitutional structure for the global market that dictates the public, private and international powers. These international economic agreements or “constitutions” resemble political constitutions and thus ensure sovereignty. The economic power is being shifted from the national to the international as well as from the public to the private to provide growth and sustainability.

Second is the separation of economic policies from domestic influence. This allows for capitalist markets to grow as well as extending the commodity form and the market forces. This separation insulates economic policies from governing regulatory powers as well as the public demand for transparency. Economic liberation is usually accompanied by political backlash, by disconnecting these two dynamisms suppresses democratic involvement. The World Bank advocates for the restriction of democratic participation and limitations imposed in the economic realm by creating a hierarchical system of representation.

Thirdly is creating “locking in” mechanisms which incorporate; laws, rules, regulations, procedures and institutions. This mechanism puts limitations on legislative and policy autonomy. Agreements are formulated to “lock in” neoliberal content through legal guarantees and sanctions. These agreements are difficult, even impossible to change which makes economic policies autonomous.

Lastly this process diminished the need for formal accountability. New constitutionalism has created a flexible system giving privileges to international corporations and private entities creating a “double” legal standard. This concept diminished the “watchdog” and gives the flexibility for self-regulation. This instrument is based on the international gold standard of the nineteenth century which gave rights to investor to avoid certain jurisdictions. Permitting deregulation of financial services and trade investment avoids popular pressures and limits the need for transparency. Minimizing liability and ensuring private authority the economic sector becomes more efficient, functional and practical.

== Institutions ==
At the global and regional level institutions are implementing the new constitutionalism framework to advance global governance by upholding the rights of private corporations and promoting a free capitalist society. These institutions policies will ensure economic growth at the global level.

=== Global ===
The World Trade Organization (WTO) is a prominent figure in governing the global economy. Formally it was the responsibility of General Agreement of Tariffs and Trade built on neoliberal principles but lacked the greater power adapted through new constitutionalism. The World Trade Organization represents a governing global entity which has adapted to the principles of new constitutionalism. The WTO main purpose is to limit national interference in the global market and challenge any nation-state regulations that could be detrimental to the economy. Any economic alternatives that are proposed by nations can be discredited by the WTO as well as restricting governments ability to implement policy in international jurisdiction. The WTO represents the freedom of markets and allowing investors to capitalize in a world economy, by doing so provides protection to the private sector. Stephen McBride describes the World Trade Organization as having “quasi-judicial and quasi-constitutional aura.” The judicial and constitutional supremacy highlights the difficulty in challenging the organizations because of lock in mechanisms.

=== Regional ===
The North American Free Trade Agreement (NAFTA) is a considered a regional governing entity that encompasses the principles of new constitutionalism. President Ronald Reagan referred to the North American Free Trade Agreement as a “new economic constitution.” Constitution because the agreement provided restrictions on government intrusion, rights to certain actors and enforcement mechanisms. The binding agreement afforded rights to both foreign and domestic investor to protect the interests of private capital and corporations. By limiting government powers the agreement locked in private interests and reduced governments ability to expand or restore public services in free trade.

== Criticisms ==
Focus at the global level has resulted in hostility between the public and private realms within nation states. This hostility creates a political struggle between the private sector who safeguard the rights of capital and the public who want to control capitalism politically, democracy and socially. The control is being denationalized and delocalized causing negative repercussions at state level. New constitutionalism lacks political will and can have detrimental effects to global dignity and future generations. Dividing economic policies from domestic creates disturbances within the civil society. Human rights, environmental concerns and public services are being devalued because of the lack of economic concern.

New constitutionalism favours the elitists providing preferential treatment and widening the social gap. International financial institutions, investors and bond-raters are holding higher positions of authority than governments or nation-states furthering global supremacy. There is an urgent need for surveillance, policy making power, regulations and transparency economic outcomes are not solely focused on monetary gain but humanitarian concerns as well. The absence of accountability and democratic authority has led many countries to depart from the constitutional framework and reclaim their sovereignty as independent nations. Australia has begun to constrain the advancements of new constitutionalism while many South America states have begun to exit the global regime completely. Canada and the United States have begun to form provisions to improve the democratic power within the global order and no longer allow for their governments to be immobilized.
