= School of International Relations of Saint Petersburg State University =

Academic division of Saint Petersburg State University

School of International Relations
- Факультет международных отношений
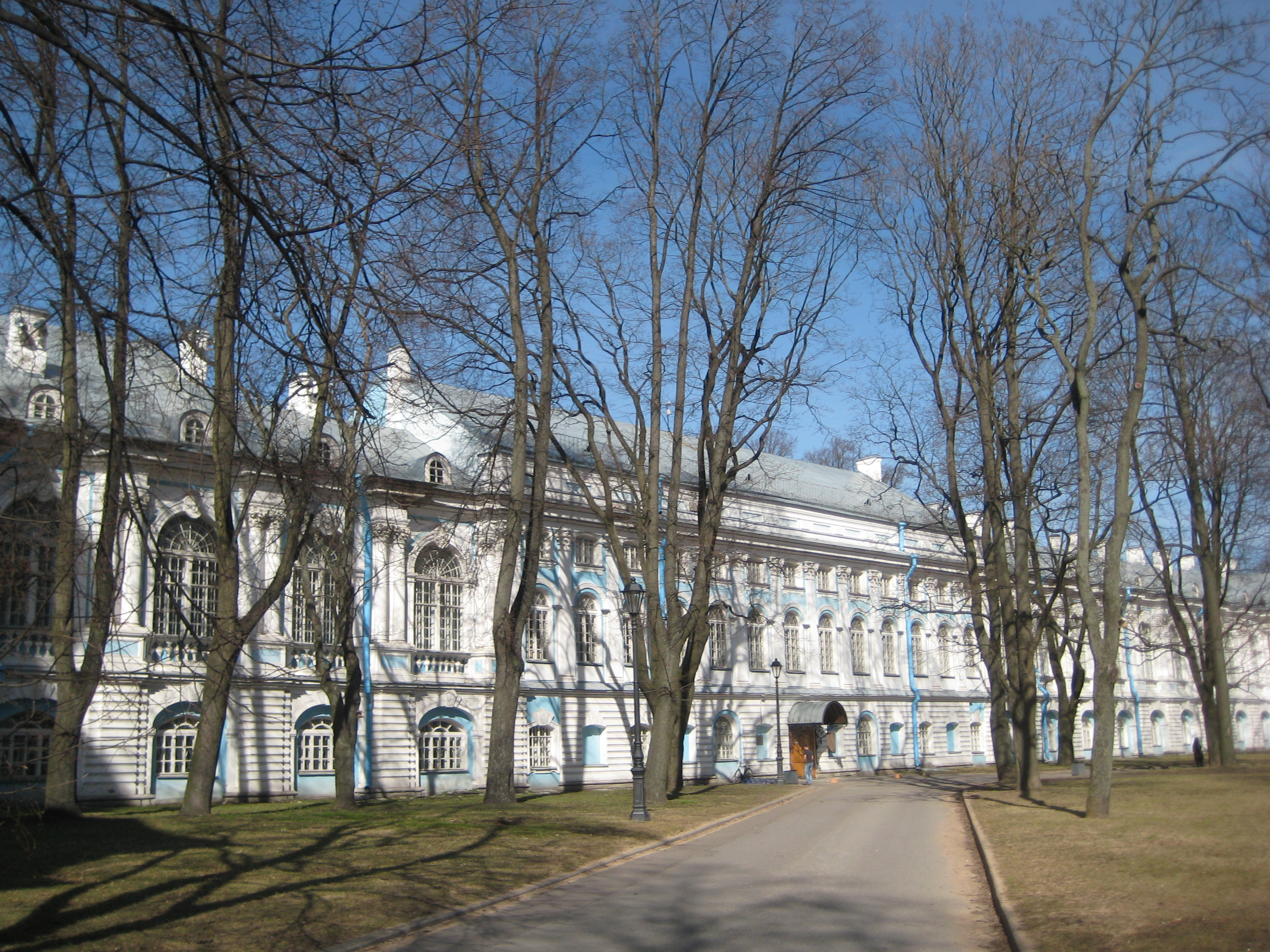
- The Smolny Convent, which houses the school
- Other names: Russian: ФМО СПбГУ (FMO SPbGU); SIR SPbU
- Type: Public
- Established: March 28, 1994
- Parent institution: Saint Petersburg State University
- Dean: Irina Novikova
- Location: Entrance 8, 1/3 Smolnogo Street, Saint Petersburg, 191124, Russia; 59.949801°N 30.395731°E
- Campus: Urban
- Language: Russian and English
- Website: sir.spbu.ru

- Location within Saint Petersburg
- Location within the Smolny Convent complex

The School of International Relations of Saint Petersburg State University (Russian: Факультет международных отношений Санкт-Петербургского государственного университета, romanized: Fakul'tet mezhdunarodnykh otnosheniy Sankt-Peterburgskogo gosudarstvennogo universiteta; abbreviated FMO SPbGU and SIR SPbU) is an academic and research division of Saint Petersburg State University in Russia. The university's Academic Council approved its establishment on March 28, 1994, and an order opening the school was signed on April 14 that year. It occupies premises in the Smolny Convent complex in Saint Petersburg.

The school provides bachelor's, master's and postgraduate research education in international relations. Its curriculum combines the history and theory of international relations, international law, international economics and foreign languages. Sixteen master's programs were offered in September 2024, including two taught in English. Irina Novikova became dean in 2011.

== History ==
=== Background (18th–20th centuries) ===
The establishment of the school followed earlier traditions of legal, historical and Oriental studies at Saint Petersburg University. The university's 1999 chronicle identifies humanities, history and law among the subjects taught in the 18th century. Legal education developed after the transformation of the Main Pedagogical Institute into the university in 1819. In the second half of the 19th century, Fyodor Martens was associated with its Department of International Law and the development of the Saint Petersburg school of international law.

The Faculty of Oriental Studies, opened in 1855, also trained specialists for diplomatic and consular service. Among its scholars was Vasily Pavlovich Vasilyev, who joined the faculty as a professor in 1855 and served as dean from 1878 to 1893.

In the 1940s, the Faculty of History at Leningrad University had a Department of the History of International Relations and Foreign Policy of the USSR. It was closed in 1950 in connection with the Leningrad affair. According to the later school's first dean, Konstantin Khudoley, subsequent proposals to restore the department were rejected. He also reported restrictions on publishing works about contemporary international relations in Leningrad during the 1970s and early 1980s. Research continued on international relations before the First World War, while publications on contemporary affairs began to appear during perestroika.

Khudoley related the creation of the new school to efforts to overcome the consequences of the 1950 closure. In preparing the project in the early 1990s, its organizers drew on the university's existing expertise in international law, economics and foreign-language teaching.

=== Establishment in 1994 ===
The proposal for a school of international relations emerged as Russian regions, businesses, research institutions and cultural organizations expanded their international contacts in the late 1980s and early 1990s. In Khudoley's account, the proposal prompted debate over the place of professional training in a classical research university, the available research expertise and the redistribution of resources during cuts to university funding. Some teaching posts became available following the closure of the Department of the History of the Communist Party of the Soviet Union.

Supporters of the project included the university's rector, Stanislav Merkuryev, and the dean of its Faculty of Mathematics and Mechanics, Gennady Leonov. Khudoley also identified historians Aleksandr Fursenko, Boris Ananich, Valentin Shishkin and Rafail Ganelin among its supporters. They regarded the project as an opportunity to restore a field of study that had previously had a dedicated department at the university.

Obtaining a license to teach international relations was a separate part of the founding process. According to Khudoley, the support of Saint Petersburg deputy mayor Vladimir Putin helped advance the licensing procedure at the federal level. Mayor Anatoly Sobchak supported developing the field but initially proposed establishing a political science faculty first and subsequently separating a school of international relations from it.

The Academic Council approved the school on March 28, 1994. On April 14, acting rector Lyudmila Verbitskaya signed Order No. 171/1, opening it on the basis of the Department of Political History. The school was allocated premises at Entrance 8, 1/3 Smolnogo Street. Its first 52 students began classes in September 1994. The university's 1999 chronicle dates the school's opening to December 19, 1994.

The organizers studied the experience of MGIMO, the College of Europe in Bruges and the School of International Relations at the University of Southern California. They adopted an interdisciplinary curriculum combining international history, international relations theory, international law and international economics with foreign-language training. Khudoley described this as an alternative both to a predominantly language-based approach and to treating international relations solely as a branch of political science.

=== Deans ===
Khudoley was the school's first dean. Yury Kuzmin was elected to the position in 2010, and Novikova became dean in 2011.

Deans of the school
Tenure	Dean
1994–2010	Konstantin Khudoley, professor and Doctor of Sciences in history
2010–2011	Yury Sergeyevich Kuzmin, Candidate of Sciences in history
Since 2011	Irina Novikova, professor and Doctor of Sciences in history

=== Stages of development ===
In his account published for the school's thirtieth anniversary, Khudoley divided its history into three stages.

Stages identified in Khudoley's 2024 account
Period	Characterization	Developments described
1994 – mid-2000s	Establishment	Recruitment of staff and students; creation of departments and degree programs; adaptation of the Smolny premises for teaching and research; development of the library, European Union Documentation Centre and Council of Europe Information Centre; and organization of international conferences.
Mid-2000s – early 2020s	Expansion of teaching and research	Introduction of additional master's programs and the university's own educational standards; growth in enrollment and the number of staff with advanced academic qualifications; expansion of analytical work and international cooperation; and establishment of a department specializing in international relations in the post-Soviet area.
Early 2020s onward	Adaptation to changing educational and international conditions	Remote teaching during the COVID-19 pandemic; development of online courses; introduction of a master's program in artificial intelligence and international security; congresses of international relations researchers in 2022 and 2024; and changes in the geographical focus of international cooperation.

An Area Studies program was introduced in 1995, followed by the European Studies master's program in 1996. The Ministry of General and Professional Education licensed master's-level teaching by Order No. 356 of November 22, 1996, before the first bachelor's cohort had graduated. The first graduates of the specialist program in International Relations and the bachelor's program in Area Studies completed their studies in 1999. A bachelor's program in International Relations was introduced in 2001.

From 2001 to 2015, the school and the Faculty of Mathematics and Mechanics jointly provided a specialist program in Applied Informatics in International Relations.

== Structure ==
=== Departments ===
The school's official departmental list in September 2026 contained seven departments:

- American Studies;
- European Studies;
- Latin American Studies;
- International Humanitarian Relations;
- International Relations in the Post-Soviet Area;
- Theory and History of International Relations;
- World Politics.

The departments of World Politics, Theory and History of International Relations, and Area Studies were established in 1994. The last was divided into European Studies and North American Studies in 1996, and International Humanitarian Relations was established in 1998. North American Studies became American Studies in 2009, and the Department of International Relations in the Post-Soviet Area was established in 2012. The university issued Order No. 10230/1 on the establishment of a Department of Latin American Studies on July 31, 2026.

=== Research centers ===
Research centers were established to coordinate work on particular subjects. The school's historical chronology records the following centers and their dates of creation.

Research centers recorded in the school's chronology
Center	Establishment
Centre for Ibero-American Studies	2014, replacing the Ibero-American Documentation Office established in 2002
Centre for Eurasian Studies	2019
Centre for Canadian Studies	2020
Historical and Diplomatic Centre	2022
Centre for Balkan Studies	2023

The activity of the Centre for Balkan Studies at the school was also documented in a December 2023 report by the HSE University Centre for Mediterranean Studies about a lecture by historian A. A. Pivovarenko.

== Academic staff ==
Vatanyar Saidovich Yagya headed the Department of World Politics from 1994. Khudoley identified him as a participant in the school's establishment. His historical account also discusses Svetlana Mikhailovna Vinogradova, head of the Department of Theory and History of International Relations, and V. G. Burkov, the first head of the Department of International Relations in the Post-Soviet Area.

Anatoly Sobchak was a professor in the Department of European Studies in 1996–1997. Part-time teaching staff described in the 2024 account included practitioners from the Russian Ministry of Foreign Affairs, the Saint Petersburg city administration and the CIS Interparliamentary Assembly.

According to the same account, 25 members of staff defended dissertations for the Russian Doctor of Sciences degree during the school's first thirty years. The proportion of full-time teaching staff holding that degree rose from 16% to 27%. Khudoley also described the presence of successive generations of scholars in the teaching staff. These figures and observations refer to the period covered by the 2024 publication.

== Educational activities ==
=== Curriculum and program governance ===
The school provides bachelor's and master's programs and postgraduate research training. Historical, political, legal, economic and language studies form part of its curriculum. Following the university's acquisition of the right to set its own educational standards in 2009, standards for International Relations were adopted in 2010 and 2018.

Master's programs have advisory councils that consider curricula, proposals for new courses and topics for final research projects. In Khudoley's 2024 account, Russian deputy foreign minister Sergey Ryabkov was identified as chair of the BRICS Studies program council. The involvement of practitioners in these councils and examination boards was described as a form of cooperation with employers.

=== Bachelor's program ===
The university's course catalogue for the 2026 cohort lists a bachelor's program titled International Relations (with the additional qualification of Specialist in Translation), under field code 41.03.05.

As described in the 2024 review, second-year students could choose a World Politics module or a regional module covering the post-Soviet area, the Americas, Europe, the Middle East, East Asia or South Asia. Third-year professional modules addressed diplomacy and public service, international business and entrepreneurship, or the media and non-governmental organizations. Fourth-year students could select individual courses. Research requirements included course papers in the first three years and a final qualification paper in the fourth year.

=== Master's programs ===
The school's thirtieth-anniversary review listed sixteen master's programs operating in September 2024. The programs and their heads below refer to that historical snapshot, rather than to a current admissions list. Opening years follow the review except for BRICS Studies, for which the university's program description gives 2016.

Master's programs and their heads as of September 2024
Program	Year opened	Program head in September 2024
American Studies	1996	Prof. Y. G. Akimov
European Studies	1996	Assoc. Prof. N. G. Zaslavskaya
History of International Relations in the 20th–21st Centuries	2001	Prof. R. V. Kostyuk
International Relations in the Post-Soviet Area	2001	Prof. N. S. Niyazov
World Politics	2002	Prof. N. Y. Markushina
Baltic and Nordic Studies	2003	Assoc. Prof. D. A. Lanko
International Humanitarian Relations	2003	Assoc. Prof. N. M. Bogolyubova
Pacific Studies	2003	Prof. N. A. Tsvetkova
International Relations (in English)	2003	Assoc. Prof. O. V. Grigoryeva
International Cooperation in Environment and Development	2004	Assoc. Prof. N. K. Kharlampyeva
Diplomacy of the Russian Federation and Foreign States	2006	Prof. S. L. Tkachenko
Theory of International Relations and Foreign Policy Analysis	2006	Prof. V. N. Konyshev
Strategic and Arms Control Studies (in English)	2010	Prof. A. Y. Pavlov
Public Relations in International Relations	2011	Assoc. Prof. R. S. Vykhodets
BRICS Studies	2016	Prof. V. L. Kheifets
Artificial Intelligence and International Security	2022 (Note: The school's chronology and Khudoley's table date the opening to 2022. In the material submitted by the university for the United Nations Secretary-General's 2024 report, the program is described as having been offered since 2023.)	Prof. K. A. Pantcerev

International Relations and Strategic and Arms Control Studies were taught in English, as were some courses in other programs. BRICS Studies, introduced in 2016, examines BRICS, its member states and international cooperation involving them. Its international accreditation was recorded separately in 2019.

=== Postgraduate research training ===
The 2024 review identified two postgraduate research programs: International Relations, Global and Regional Studies; and History of International Relations and Foreign Policy.

=== Online courses and additional education ===
The school’s online teaching was described in the 2024 review within the context of the university's activities on Russia's Open Education platform and international platforms, including China's XuetangX. Courses listed on Open Education included Contemporary Theories of International Relations, Digitalization of International Relations, and US Public Diplomacy. The digitalization course was available in Russian and English and was incorporated into curricula in more than one field of study at the university.

The school's chronology also records the establishment in 1995 of an additional-education program known as the Maly fakultet mezhdunarodnykh otnosheniy (Small School of International Relations).

=== International educational cooperation ===
A double-degree program in Baltic and Nordic Studies was developed with the University of Tampere. Its first curriculum at Saint Petersburg University was drawn up in 2003, and work on the joint program began in 2004 within the Finnish–Russian Cross-Border University framework. Teaching took place in English in both countries. The curriculum combined Saint Petersburg's regional studies courses with political theory and research methods taught in Tampere.

In a May 2024 interview with Peterburgsky Dnevnik, Novikova said that the school's former double-degree programs with European universities were no longer operating at that time.

=== International security education ===
The United Nations Secretary-General's report Disarmament and non-proliferation education, dated July 2, 2024, included information supplied by Saint Petersburg University about Strategic and Arms Control Studies and Artificial Intelligence and International Security. The submission described teaching on arms control, the non-proliferation of weapons of mass destruction, preventing an arms race in space, and the implications of artificial intelligence for non-proliferation regimes.

=== International accreditation and external evaluation ===
The register of the Agency for Quality Assurance in Higher Education and Career Development (AKKORK) records ZEvA accreditation for the International Relations bachelor's program and fourteen master's programs for 2018–2023. It lists a separate period of 2019–2025 for BRICS Studies.

A ZEvA expert visit on September 26–28, 2017, preceded the commission's accreditation decision of February 27, 2018. The panel positively assessed teaching and the combination of academic education with professional skills. Its recommendations included reducing administrative burdens on teaching staff, expanding the use and teaching of qualitative and quantitative research methods, and improving feedback from course evaluations. It recommended full access to evaluation results for teaching staff and that students be informed of the surveys' principal findings.

== Research ==
=== Publications ===
International relations articles appeared in Series 6 of Vestnik of Saint Petersburg University from 1995. In 2015–2017, the relevant journal was titled Vestnik of Saint Petersburg University. Political Science. International Relations. Since 2018, it has appeared under the separate title Vestnik of Saint Petersburg University. International Relations. The university is the journal's founder, and Saint Petersburg University Press is its publisher. It is published quarterly in Russian and English.

The 2024 historical review identified contributors from Russia, Australia, Argentina, Brazil, India, China, the United States and other countries. It also described thematic issues on European integration, Russia–South Korea relations, the First World War and the effects of digital technology on world politics.

The English-language edited volume Russia and the World: Understanding International Relations, edited by Natalia Tsvetkova, was published by Lexington Books in 2017 with contributions from members of the school. The university's research catalogue associates the volume with the Department of American Studies. It addresses theories and methods of international relations, global issues and Russian foreign policy.

=== Conferences and forums ===
The seventh convention of the Central and East European International Studies Association (CEEISA) was held at the school on September 2–4, 2009.

The school participated with the Institute of Latin America of the Russian Academy of Sciences in organizing Russia–Latin America forums in 2013, 2015, 2017, 2019, 2021 and 2023. A seventh forum, Russia and Ibero-America in a Turbulent World: From Common Challenges to Joint Solutions, was organized by Saint Petersburg University and the institute on October 1–3, 2025. Its program covered historical, political, economic and legal issues; participants included researchers from IMEMO.

The research and educational forum Asian Dialogue 2023 opened at the school on June 5, 2023, with support from the Gorchakov Foundation. Experts from Russia, India, Bangladesh and Pakistan participated.

The first and second Saint Petersburg congresses of international relations researchers took place in November 2022 and April 2024. Khudoley's review reported 550 participants from Russia and 21 other countries at the first and approximately 1,100 participants from Russian institutions and 26 other countries at the second.

The Third Saint Petersburg Congress of International Studies, Global and Regional Challenges in the Changing World, took place on April 28–30, 2026. The school was its organizer. The Institute of Europe of the Russian Academy of Sciences reported participation by its researchers and the Association of European Studies.

=== Expert work and professional associations ===
Khudoley's account describes staff participation in advisory councils, preparation of analytical material for public authorities, and cooperation with the Russian International Affairs Council and the Valdai Discussion Club. Staff and students also participated in public-diplomacy initiatives including the Petersburg Dialogue and the Russia–Republic of Korea Dialogue.

According to the same account, the university, represented by the school, joined the Association of Professional Schools of International Affairs (APSIA) as an affiliate in 1998 and subsequently became a full member. The account describes participation in APSIA until spring 2022. It also records involvement in the Union of Schools of Politics and International Relations (USPIR), based at Fudan University.

== Students and student life ==
=== Enrollment ===
The thirtieth-anniversary review reported approximately 900 bachelor's students and 350 master's students in spring 2024. During the school's first thirty years, students from 109 countries had studied there, including China, Japan, Kazakhstan, Turkey, Italy, Germany, Uzbekistan, Brazil, Iran, France, South Korea and the United States.

=== Student organizations and Model United Nations ===
A Student Scientific Society (Russian: Студенческое научное общество, SNO) was established in 1998, and a student council in 2011. The society organizes student conferences and maintains a blog on the Russian International Affairs Council website featuring student writing on international affairs.

The school's student activities include Model United Nations. Participants represent the positions of particular states, speak in committees and negotiate draft resolutions. In a June 2024 interview with Pyat Uglov, a participant described selection through an interview and preparation of a report, as well as the involvement of students from different universities.

SmolnyIMUN 2025 included six committees working in Russian, English, German and Spanish. Participants included students of Peter the Great St. Petersburg Polytechnic University as well as Saint Petersburg University.

=== Student projects and awards ===
Students have participated in the nationwide Student Startup competition. According to Khudoley's 2024 review, fourteen teams of international relations students at Saint Petersburg University won in the competition in 2023–2024. The review also describes student projects presented at the AIM investment forum in Abu Dhabi in 2023.

On May 26, 2021, the Legislative Assembly of Saint Petersburg established a prize named after Vatanyar Yagya for students of the school. The announced arrangements provided for three students to be selected annually by the school's Academic Council, with each receiving 50,000 rubles.

== Alumni and former students ==
The decision to establish the school's alumni association was taken at an annual alumni gathering on September 29, 2013. The meeting adopted the association's founding concept and elected a council; Khudoley became its honorary chair.

Alumni include the writer, playwright and screenwriter Alexander Tsypkin, and international relations specialist Dmitry Vyacheslavovich Suslov, who graduated in 2001. Ksenia Sobchak enrolled at the school in 1998 and transferred to MGIMO's international relations faculty in 2001. She graduated from MGIMO in 2002.

In his 2024 review, Khudoley described alumni employment in the Presidential Administration of Russia, the offices of the Government of Russia and Federal Assembly of Russia, and the Ministry of Foreign Affairs. The review also noted foreign minister Sergey Lavrov's favorable assessment of their training in a message marking the start of the academic year.

Other career paths described in the review included employment at companies such as Gazprom and Rosneft, at the World Bank and the CIS Interparliamentary Assembly, and in science, education, culture and the media. Alumni were also involved in organizing international events, including the 2014 Winter Olympics in Sochi.

== Premises and library ==
The school occupies part of the former Smolny Convent, an architectural complex designed by Francesco Bartolomeo Rastrelli and developed in the 18th and 19th centuries. Before the premises were transferred to the school, Entrance 8 housed an archive of historical and political documents. The school's historic assembly hall was restored in 2006.

A European Documentation Centre was established in 1995 and a Council of Europe Information Centre in 1999. In 2000, a subject library for international relations was established within the university's M. Gorky Scientific Library, together with a United Nations documents depository center. The library was refurbished in 2009. The ZEvA report following the 2017 visit described the subject library and its foreign-language literature and periodicals.

The United Nations Depository Libraries Directory identifies the university depository as DL-059, at Entrance 8, 1/3 Smolnogo Street. It dates the university library's participation in the depository program to May 1965 and lists UN publications in English and Russian and documents of the United Nations Economic Commission for Europe.

== University subject rankings and assessments ==
Subject rankings in political science and international relations evaluate Saint Petersburg State University, rather than the school as a separate institution. The university's positions in the RAEX subject ranking were:

RAEX: Political Science and International Relations
Edition	University's position	Source
2023	1	
2024	2	
2025	3	
2026	3	

In the 2024 edition, Saint Petersburg University placed second behind Moscow State University.

In a July 6, 2023 report, the school's alumni association stated that the university had ranked among the top 100 in the QS subject ranking for politics and international relations in preceding years. In his 2024 anniversary article, Khudoley characterized the school as one of Russia's leading centers for the study of international relations and world politics.

== Visits and public events ==
Khudoley's historical account distinguishes between university-wide events involving the school's staff and students and visits to the school itself. Staff and students participated in preparing and holding university meetings with Vladimir Putin and US president George W. Bush in 2002, French president Jacques Chirac and German chancellor Gerhard Schröder in 2003, and Chinese president Xi Jinping in 2019.

Visitors to the school itself included Mikhail Gorbachev and Lothar de Maizière, co-chairs of the Petersburg Dialogue, and María Fernanda Espinosa, president of the 73rd session of the United Nations General Assembly.

== Bibliography ==
- Sobolev, G. L.; Tikhonov, I. L.; Tishkin, G. A. (1999). L. A. Verbitskaya (ed.). 275 лет. Санкт-Петербургский университет. Летопись 1724—1999 [275 Years. Saint Petersburg University: A Chronicle, 1724–1999] (in Russian). Saint Petersburg: Saint Petersburg University Press. ISBN 5-288-02146-5.
- Tarasova, A. S. (2023). "Современные тенденции парадипломатии на примере российско-финляндского регионального сотрудничества" [Contemporary trends in paradiplomacy: the case of Russian–Finnish regional cooperation]. Baltic Region (in Russian). 15 (3): 83–99. doi:10.5922/2079-8555-2023-3-5.
- Khudoley, K. K. (2024). "Факультет международных отношений Санкт-Петербургского государственного университета: основные вехи развития, достижения и вызовы (к 30-летию создания)" [School of International Relations of St. Petersburg State University: Key milestones, achievements, and challenges (dedicated to the 30th anniversary)]. Vestnik of Saint Petersburg University. International Relations (in Russian). 17 (4): 386–410. doi:10.21638/spbu06.2024.401. Archived from the original on July 19, 2025.
