= Louis Goodman =

Louis Goodman may refer to:

- Louis Earl Goodman (1892–1961), United States federal judge
- Louis S. Goodman (1906–2000), pharmacologist and chemotherapy pioneer
- Louis W. Goodman, international relations scholar
