= Isabella C. Bakker =

Canadian political scientist

- Born: 1956 (age 69–70)

Academic background
- Education: BA., Carleton University; PhD., The New School
- Thesis: The reproduction of the working population in Canada, 1945 to 1983: a theoretical and empirical contribution (1986)

Academic work
- Discipline: Political Science
- Institutions: York University
- Main interests: Gender

Isabella C. Bakker FRSC (born 1956) is a Canadian political scientist, currently a Distinguished Research Professor and York Research Chair at York University. In 2009, Bakker became the first York University professor to earn a Trudeau Fellowship and was later elected a Fellow of the Royal Society of Canada.

== Career ==
Bakker joined York University as an associate professor in political science in 1990. She later became the first female chair of the department. In 2003, Bakker and Stephen Gill published a book titled "Power, Production and Social Reproduction: Human In/security in the Global Political Economy" to argue that social reproduction should be the focus of global political economy, as opposed to power and production. On March 22, 2004, Bakker was named a Fulbright Program New Century Scholar for her work in feminist political economy. Under the title of a Fulbright Scholar, Bakker spent five months as a visiting scholar at the United Nations Division for the Advancement of Women.

In 2008, Bakker edited a policy research paper with Dr. Janine Brodie after consultation with the Policy Research Fund of Status of Women Canada. The paper, titled "Where Are the Women?," focused on gender within contemporary Canadian public policy and was published through the Canadian Centre for Policy Alternatives. She also edited a book with Rachel Silvey titled "Beyond States and Markets: The Challenges of Social Reproduction," which argued there was a link between social reproduction and power and production. In 2009, Bakker became the first York professor to be awarded a Trudeau Fellowship for her work in feminist and critical political economy.

In 2011, Bakker was one of three York professors to be elected a Fellow of the Royal Society of Canada. That year, she also co-edited a book through Routledge titled "Questioning Financial Governance from a Feminist Perspective" which aimed to analyze the role gender plays in fiscal and monetary policy, and financial regulation. After being named a Distinguished Research Professor by York in 2014, Bakker was appointed a Tier 1 York Research Chair in Global Economic Governance, Gender and Human Rights.

During the 2017–18 academic year, Bakker was awarded a Fulbright Visiting Research Chair at the University of California, Santa Barbara.

== Publications ==
The following is a list of publications:

- Questioning Financial Governance from a Feminist Perspective (2011)
- Beyond States and Markets: the Challenges of Social Reproduction (2008)
- Where are the women?: gender equity, budgets and Canadian public policy (2008)
- Canada's social policy regime and women: an assessment of the last decade (2007)
- Gender budget initiatives: why they matter in Canada (2006)
- Power, production, and social reproduction : human in/security in the global political economy (2003)
- Unpaid work and macroeconomics: new discussions, new tools for action (1998)
- Rethinking restructuring: gender and change in Canada (1996)
- The Strategic silence: gender and economic policy (1994)
