= Association of Professional Schools of International Affairs =

Non-profit educational organization of graduate schools of international affairs

- Abbreviation: APSIA
- Founded: 1989
- Type: Non-profit educational organization
- Location: Washington, D.C., U.S.
- Fields: Higher education, International relations
- Members: 41 full members and 30 affiliates (as of 2026)
- Key people: Arancha González (President)
- Website: apsia.org

The Association of Professional Schools of International Affairs (APSIA) is a non-profit educational organization of leading universities in the field of international affairs education and research. As of 2026, the association includes 41 full members and 30 affiliate schools.

== History ==
The idea for the association emerged in the mid-1970s, when deans of leading American schools of international affairs began informal discussions on how to improve student training. With a grant from the Exxon Education Foundation, these schools conducted a comparative analysis of their curricula.

In 1987, Robert Goheen, former president of Princeton University, conducted a study recommending the creation of a "full-fledged organization" to facilitate the exchange of experience. Following his recommendations, APSIA was officially incorporated as a non-profit organization on April 13, 1989. The first president was Jeswald Salacuse of Tufts University.

In the 1990s, after the end of the Cold War, APSIA expanded its activities with support from the Pew, Ford, and other foundations. A key project of this period was the detailed report Professional Schools of International Affairs on the Eve of the 21st Century (1994), prepared under the leadership of Louis W. Goodman. The report's goal was to analyze how the then-15 member schools were adapting their curricula to new global challenges.

This period saw a surge in interest in international affairs education. In the first five years of the association's existence (1989–1994), the number of applications to member schools increased by nearly 60%, and the number of enrolled students grew by almost 40%.

In the 2000s, the association continued to grow, establishing partnerships to attract underrepresented groups to the field of international relations and organizing international career and education fairs. Today, APSIA aims to "advance international understanding, prosperity, peace, and security through the people and ideas shaped by our schools."

== Leadership ==
The highest governing body of the association is the Executive Committee. The term for the 2023–2025 committee began on June 1, 2023. In January 2025, its composition was updated. The current members include:

- President: Arancha González, Dean of the Paris School of International Affairs (PSIA) at Sciences Po.
- Vice President: Amaney Jamal, Dean of the Princeton School of Public and International Affairs.
- Treasurer: Carissa Slotterback, Dean of the Graduate School of Public and International Affairs at the University of Pittsburgh.
- Committee Members: Danny Quah (National University of Singapore), Miguel Angel Santos (Tecnológico de Monterrey), Marie-Laure Salles (Geneva Graduate Institute).

== Structure and membership ==
APSIA offers two levels of participation:

- Full Members are autonomous university units with master's degree programs that meet all of APSIA's criteria. They have voting rights in the Council of Members, can hold leadership positions in the association, and actively participate in all events.
- Affiliate Status is available for units with master's degree programs that do not seek full membership or do not meet all its criteria. Affiliates participate in a limited number of events and do not have voting rights.

Admission to the association is by invitation after a review of the application by the membership committee and a vote by the Council of Members.

== Activities ==
=== APSIA Awards ===
Since 2021, the association has presented the annual APSIA Awards to recognize and encourage innovation within the member school community. Nominations can come from the educational institutions themselves and the general public. There are four main categories: Innovation, Inclusivity, Bridging Theory and Practice, and the Impact Award.

Impact Award Winners:

- 2021: University of California, San Diego School of Global Policy and Strategy
- 2022: Lee Kuan Yew School of Public Policy at the National University of Singapore
- 2023: The Fletcher School at Tufts University
- 2024: Paris School of International Affairs (PSIA) at Sciences Po
- 2025: Geneva Graduate Institute

== Features and significance ==
According to the association, APSIA member institutions emphasize the application of theory to solve practical problems. Their programs combine training in areas such as critical thinking, quantitative analysis, public communication, and project management with in-depth regional, cultural, and economic expertise.

The significance of APSIA schools is confirmed by the success of their graduates, who have become heads of state and senior officials in more than 12 countries. The association's institutions consistently rank among the top five producers of prestigious American fellowships, such as the Presidential Management Fellows and Boren Fellows. Each year, more than 80% of the Pickering and Rangel Fellows, who are prepared for careers as U.S. diplomats, are students at APSIA member schools. The employment or graduate school placement rate shortly after graduation is 91%.

== Fellowships and internships ==
APSIA helps students find fellowships and scholarships to fund their education. The association's official website features a Fellowship Board that consolidates funding opportunities related to the field of international relations.

== Members ==
As of 2025, the association includes 40 full members and 30 affiliate schools.

=== Initial members (1994) ===
According to the 1994 report, the association comprised 15 American university members:

1. American University (School of International Service)
2. University of California, San Diego (School of Global Policy and Strategy)
3. Columbia University (School of International and Public Affairs)
4. University of Denver (Josef Korbel School of International Studies)
5. Georgetown University (Edmund A. Walsh School of Foreign Service)
6. George Washington University (Elliott School of International Affairs)
7. Harvard University (John F. Kennedy School of Government)
8. Johns Hopkins University (Paul H. Nitze School of Advanced International Studies)
9. University of Maryland, College Park (School of Public Policy)
10. University of Pittsburgh (Graduate School of Public and International Affairs)
11. Princeton University (Princeton School of Public and International Affairs)
12. University of Southern California (USC School of International Relations)
13. Tufts University (The Fletcher School of Law and Diplomacy)
14. University of Washington (Henry M. Jackson School of International Studies)
15. Yale University (Jackson School of Global Affairs)

=== Full members (2026) ===
University	School/Faculty	Country	Location
American University	School of International Service	United States	Washington, D.C.
Australian National University	Crawford School of Public Policy	Australia	Canberra
Boston University	Frederick S. Pardee School of Global Studies	United States	Boston
Carleton University	Norman Paterson School of International Affairs	Canada	Ottawa
Columbia University	School of International and Public Affairs	United States	New York City
Duke University	Sanford School of Public Policy	United States	Durham
Florida International University	Steven J. Green School of International and Public Affairs	United States	Miami
George Washington University	Elliott School of International Affairs	United States	Washington, D.C.
Georgetown University	Edmund A. Walsh School of Foreign Service	United States	Washington, D.C.
Georgia Institute of Technology	Sam Nunn School of International Affairs	United States	Atlanta
Geneva Graduate Institute		Switzerland	Geneva
Harvard University	John F. Kennedy School of Government	United States	Cambridge
Hertie School		Germany	Berlin
IE University	School of Politics, Economics and Global Affairs	Spain	Madrid
Barcelona Institute for International Studies (IBEI)		Spain	Barcelona
Johns Hopkins University	Paul H. Nitze School of Advanced International Studies	United States / Italy / China	Washington, D.C., Bologna, Nanjing
National Chengchi University	College of International Affairs	Taiwan	Taipei
National University of Singapore	Lee Kuan Yew School of Public Policy	Singapore	Singapore
Pennsylvania State University	School of International Affairs	United States	University Park
Princeton University	Princeton School of Public and International Affairs	United States	Princeton
Ritsumeikan University	Graduate School of International Relations	Japan	Kyoto
Sciences Po	Paris School of International Affairs	France	Paris
Stanford University	Freeman Spogli Institute for International Studies	United States	Stanford
Stockholm School of Economics		Sweden	Stockholm
Syracuse University	Maxwell School of Citizenship and Public Affairs	United States	Syracuse
Monterrey Institute of Technology and Higher Education	School of Government and Public Transformation	Mexico	Monterrey
Texas A&M University	Bush School of Government and Public Service	United States	College Station
Tufts University	The Fletcher School of Law and Diplomacy	United States	Medford
University Mohammed VI Polytechnic	Faculty of Governance, Economics and Social Sciences	Morocco	Rabat
University of California, San Diego	School of Global Policy and Strategy	United States	San Diego
University of Denver	Josef Korbel School of International Studies	United States	Denver
University of Maryland, College Park	School of Public Policy	United States	College Park
University of Michigan	Gerald R. Ford School of Public Policy	United States	Ann Arbor
University of Minnesota	Hubert H. Humphrey School of Public Affairs	United States	Minneapolis
University of Pittsburgh	Graduate School of Public and International Affairs	United States	Pittsburgh
University of Southern California	USC School of International Relations	United States	Los Angeles
University of St. Gallen	Master's Programme in International Affairs and Governance	Switzerland	St. Gallen
University of Texas at Austin	Lyndon B. Johnson School of Public Affairs	United States	Austin
University of Toronto	Munk School of Global Affairs and Public Policy	Canada	Toronto
University of Washington	Henry M. Jackson School of International Studies	United States	Seattle
Yale University	Jackson School of Global Affairs	United States	New Haven

=== Affiliate members (2025) ===
University	School/Faculty	Country	Location
ADA University	School of Public and International Affairs	Azerbaijan	Baku
Arizona State University	Thunderbird School of Global Management	United States	Phoenix
University of Waterloo, Wilfrid Laurier University, and Centre for International Governance Innovation	Balsillie School of International Affairs	Canada	Waterloo
Baruch College	Austin W. Marxe School of Public and International Affairs	United States	New York City
Brandeis University	The Heller School for Social Policy and Management	United States	Waltham
Carnegie Mellon University	Institute for Strategy and Technology	United States	Pittsburgh
DePaul University	Department of International Studies	United States	Chicago
Diplomatic Academy of Vienna		Austria	Vienna
European University Institute	Florence School of Transnational Governance	Italy	Fiesole
Fordham University	International Political Economy and Development Program	United States	New York City
George Mason University	Schar School of Policy and Government	United States	Arlington
Indiana University	O'Neill School of Public and Environmental Affairs and Hamilton Lugar School of Global and International Studies	United States	Bloomington
International University of Japan	Graduate School of International Relations	Japan	Minamiuonuma
Monash University	Master of International Relations Program	Australia	Melbourne
Nanyang Technological University	S. Rajaratnam School of International Studies	Singapore	Singapore
New York University	Robert F. Wagner Graduate School of Public Service	United States	New York City
North Carolina State University	School of Public and International Affairs	United States	Raleigh
Pepperdine University	School of Public Policy	United States	Malibu
Prague University of Economics and Business	Faculty of International and Diplomatic Studies	Czech Republic	Prague
Rice University	Master of Global Affairs Program	United States	Houston
San Francisco State University	Department of International Relations	United States	San Francisco
Seton Hall University	School of Diplomacy and International Relations	United States	South Orange
Austral University	School of Policy, Government, and International Relations	Argentina	Buenos Aires
University of Trento	School of International Studies	Italy	Trento
University of British Columbia	School of Public Policy and Global Affairs	Canada	Vancouver
University of Georgia	School of Public and International Affairs	United States	Athens
University of Miami	Master of Arts in International Administration Program	United States	Coral Gables
University of Oregon	School of Global Studies and Languages	United States	Eugene
Utsunomiya University	Graduate School of International Studies	Japan	Utsunomiya
Waseda University	Graduate School of Asia-Pacific Studies	Japan	Tokyo

=== Former members ===
This list includes institutions that were previously members of the association but are not listed in its directories as of 2025.

- Moscow State Institute of International Relations
- Saint Petersburg State University, School of International Relations

== Bibliography ==
- Goodman, Louis W. (1994). Professional Schools of International Affairs on the Eve of the 21st Century. ERIC. et al. Washington, D.C.: Association of Professional Schools of International Affairs. p. 114. ISBN 1-886780-00-5. ED380050. Archived (PDF) from the original on March 8, 2025.
- Khudoley, K. K. (2024). "The Faculty of International Relations of St. Petersburg State University: main milestones of development, achievements and challenges (to the 30th anniversary of its creation)" [Факультет международных отношений Санкт-Петербургского государственного университета: основные вехи развития, достижения и вызовы (к 30-летию создания)]. Vestnik of Saint Petersburg University. International Relations (in Russian). 17 (4): 386–410. doi:10.21638/spbu06.2024.401. Archived from the original on July 19, 2025.
