= Graduate School of Asia-Pacific Studies =

Graduate school in Japan

- 大学院アジア太平洋研究科 (Daigakuin Ajia Taiheiyō Kenkyūka)
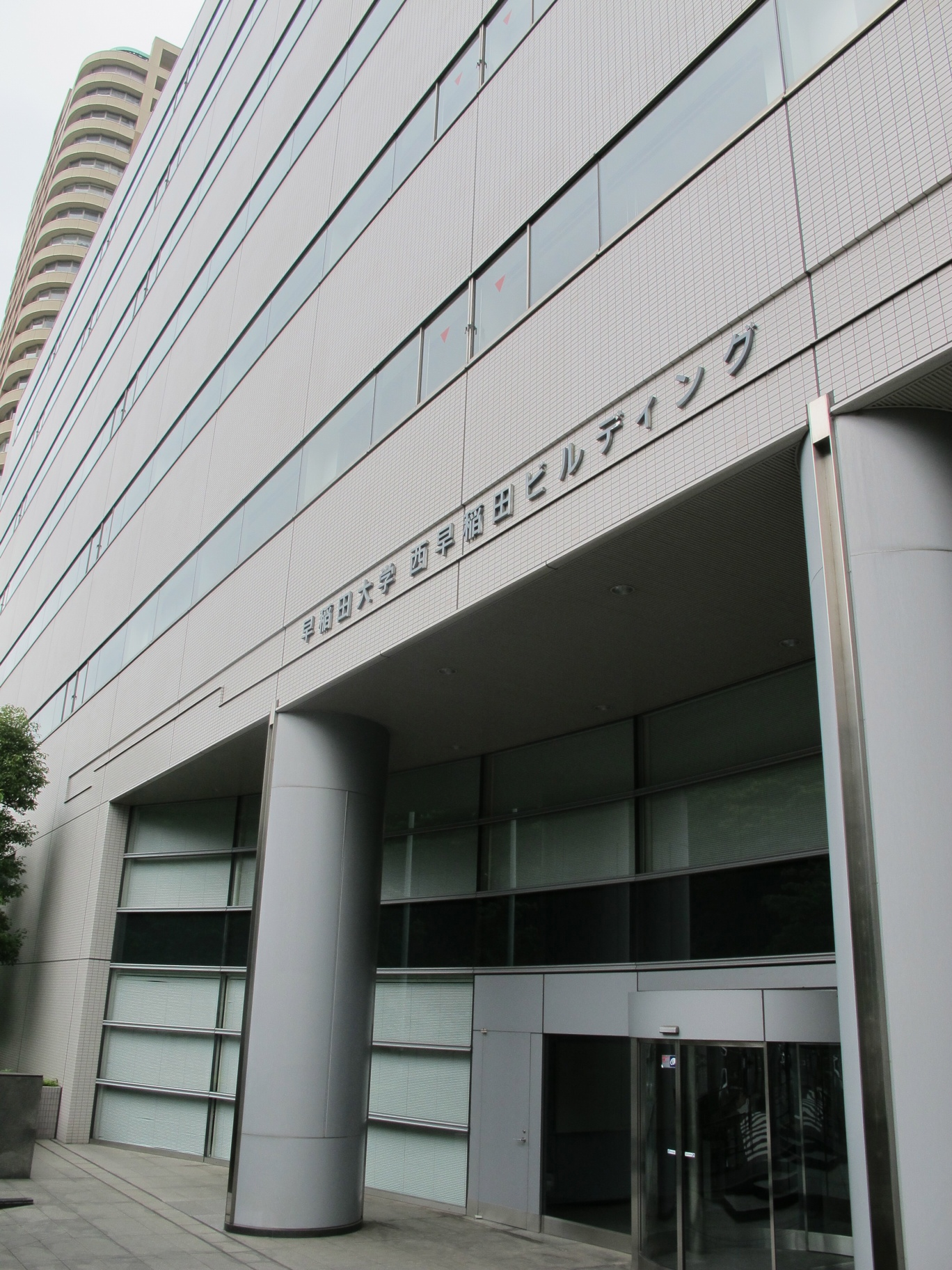
- GSAPS building
- Other name: GSAPS
- Type: Independent graduate institute of Waseda University
- Established: April 1998
- Dean: Prof. Yasushi Katsuma (currently)
- Students: 427 from 50 different countries and regions (2011)
- Location: Tokyo, Japan
- Website: http://www.waseda.jp/gsaps/

The Graduate School of Asia-Pacific Studies (大学院アジア太平洋研究科, Daigakuin Ajia Taiheiyō Kenkyūka), or GSAPS, is an independent graduate school focusing on international relations and area studies of the Asia-Pacific region.

GSAPS was established in April 1998 on the Waseda Campus of Waseda University in Tokyo, Japan. GSAPS students, faculty, and alumni come from more than 50 countries, making it the university's foremost hub for international graduate education and one of Japan's most culturally diverse graduate institutes.

== History ==
In 1940, Waseda University's Koa Economic Research Institute (興亜経済研究所) established, which was later reorganized as Social Science Research Institute (社会科学研究所).

In 1956, Waseda University Manufacturing Research Institute (生産研究所) was established, which was later reorganized as the Systems Science Research Institute (システム科学研究所).

In 1997, Waseda University Institute of Social Science and Waseda University Institute of Systems Science were integrated into the Waseda University Asia-Pacific Research Center (アジア太平洋研究センタ).

In 1998, master's program in International Relations and International Management established at Waseda University Graduate School of Asia-Pacific Studies (International Management major moved to Waseda University Graduate School of Commerce in 2006).

In 2000, doctoral program was established at Waseda University Graduate School of Asia-Pacific Studies.

== Academic ==
GSAPS' core teaching and research areas are in East Asian studies and Southeast Asian studies, international relations, and international cooperation and policy studies. Research seminars and classes are organized around these three themes. The School operates on a quarterly calendar, with English and Japanese classes held from April to July (Spring), August (Summer), September to January (Fall), and February (Winter).

The master's degree (MA) program in International Relations has three areas: Area Studies, International Relations, and International Cooperation/Policy Studies. This program aims to cultivate professionals who can play an active role in international society, including the Asia-Pacific region. The doctoral program (Ph.D.) program in International Relations consists of three areas: Area Studies, International Relations, and International Cooperation/Policy Research.

== Student profile ==
As of May 1, 2011, there are total 427 students including 283 of Master students and 144 of PHD students. 69.6% of MA students are from overseas, and 30.4% are Japanese local students. The GSA, the school's official student organization, frequently organizes social, academic, and career-related events.

== International cooperation ==
GSAPS conducts regular teaching and research activities with the London School of Economics and Political Science, Graduate Institute of International and Development Studies, National University of Singapore, Seoul National University, and Chulalongkorn University, among other partner schools. Also, through the European Commission's Erasmus Mundus international mobility programme, GSAPS administers a joint doctoral program on Globalisation, the EU, and Multilateralism in partnership with Université Libre de Bruxelles in Belgium, University of Warwick in the United Kingdom, Libera Università Internazionale degli Studi Sociali in Italy, Université de Genève in Switzerland, and Fudan University in China.

GSAPS is an affiliate member of the Association of Professional Schools of International Affairs (APSIA), a network of leading international relations and public policy schools from around the world.

GSAPS has recently spearheaded the Campus Asia program, which is aimed at establishing an EUI-type institution in Asia. This effort is currently underway in conjunction with Peking University, Korea University, Thammasat University, and Nanyang Technological University.

== Location ==
The GSAPS Building (No.19) is located at Waseda University Main Campus, Shinjuku, Tokyo, Japan.

== Faculty members ==
- Satoshi Amako (Ph.D. Sociology, Hitotsubashi University)
- Nobuhiko Fuwa (Ph.D. Agricultural and Resource Economics, University of California-Berkeley)
- Sachiko Hirakawa (Ph.D. International Relations, Waseda University)
- Akiko Kamogawa (Ed.D., Waseda University)
- Yasushi Katsuma (LL.M, Ph.D. Development Studies, University of Wisconsin-Madison)
- Yukio Kawamura (Master of Laws, University of Miami)
- Toshiharu Kitamura (M.Phil., Oxford University)
- Hideo Kobayashi (Doctor of Social Science, Tokyo Metropolitan University)
- Kazuo Kuroda (Ph.D Sociology of Education, Cornell University)
- Gracia Liu-Farrer (Ph.D. Sociology, University of Chicago)
- Shunji Matsuoka (Ph.D., Hiroshima University)
- Hitoshi Mitomo (Doctor of Urban and Regional Planning Studies, University of Tsukuba)
- Eiji Murashima
- Toshio Obi (Ph.D. Global Information and Telecommunication Studies, Waseda University)
- Glenda Roberts (Ph.D. Anthropology, Cornell University)
- Hatsue Shinohara (Ph.D. History, University of Chicago)
- Masaya Shiraishi (Ph.D. Sociology, University of Tokyo)
- Chikako Ueki (Ph.D. Political Science, MIT)
- Shujiro Urata (Ph.D. Economics, Stanford University)
- Michio Yamaoka (Ph.D. Social Science-International Relations, Waseda University)

== See also ==
- National Graduate Institute for Policy Studies
