= Cathy Schneider =

- Education: University at Albany, SUNY (BA, MA); Cornell University (MA, PhD)
- Occupations: Author; professor

Cathy Lisa Schneider is an American author and professor emerita of democracy and dictatorship; comparative social movements; political violence; and policing. She is a professor emerita at the American University School of International Service.

== Education ==
Schneider completed a Bachelor of Arts and Master of Arts at the University at Albany, SUNY. She earned a Master of Arts and Ph.D. at Cornell University.

== Career ==
Schneider writes and teaches on democracy, dictatorship and resistance, political violence and social movements. Her research and publications are based on ethnographic research in Latin America, the United States and Europe. She is a professor at American University School of International Service.

== Selected works ==
- Schneider, Cathy Lisa (2010). Shantytown Protest in Pinochet's Chile. Temple University Press. ISBN 9781439905463.
- Schneider, Cathy Lisa (2014). Police Power and Race Riots: Urban Unrest in Paris and New York. University of Pennsylvania Press. ISBN 9780812209860.
- Castañeda, Ernesto; Schneider, Cathy Lisa (2017). Collective Violence, Contentious Politics, and Social Change: A Charles Tilly Reader. Routledge. ISBN 9781351792776.
