= Neo-Gramscianism =

International relations theory

Neo-Gramscianism is a critical theory approach to the study of international relations (IR) and the global political economy (GPE) that explores the interface of ideas, institutions and material capabilities as they shape the specific contours of the state formation. The theory is heavily influenced by the writings of Antonio Gramsci. Neo-Gramscianism analyzes how the particular constellation of social forces, the state and the dominant ideational configuration define and sustain world orders. In this sense, the neo-Gramscian approach breaks the decades-old stalemate between the realist schools of thought and the liberal theories by historicizing the very theoretical foundations of the two streams as part of a particular world order and finding the interlocking relationship between agency and structure. Karl Polanyi, Karl Marx, Max Weber, Max Horkheimer, Theodor Adorno and Michel Foucault are cited as major sources within the critical theory of IR.

== Origins of the neo-Gramscian perspective ==
The beginning of the neo-Gramscian perspective can be traced to York University professor emeritus Robert W. Cox's article "Social Forces, States and World Orders: Beyond International Relations Theory" in Millennium 10 (1981) 2 and "Gramsci, Hegemony and International Relations: An Essay in Method", published in Millennium 12 (1983) 2. In his 1981 article, Cox demands a critical study of IR as opposed to the usual "problem-solving" theories, which do not interrogate the origin, nature and development of historical structures, but accept for example that states and the (supposedly) "anarchic" relationships between them as Kantian Dinge an sich.

However, Cox disavows the label neo-Gramscian despite the fact that in a follow-up article he showed how Gramsci's thought can be used to analyze power structures within the GPE. Particularly Gramsci's concept of cultural hegemony, vastly different from the realists' conception of hegemony, appears fruitful. Gramsci's state theory, his conception of "historic blocs"—dominant configurations of material capabilities, ideologies and institutions as determining frames for individual and collective action—and of élites acting as "organic intellectuals" forging historic blocs, is also deemed useful.

The neo-Gramscian approach has also been developed along somewhat different lines by Cox's colleague, Stephen Gill, distinguished research professor of political science at York University. Gill contributed to showing how the elite Trilateral Commission acted as an "organic intellectual", forging the (currently hegemonic) ideology of neoliberalism and the so-called Washington Consensus and later in relation to the globalization of power and resistance in his book Power and Resistance in the New World Order (Palgrave, 2003). Gill also partnered with fellow Canadian academic A. Claire Cutler to release a neo-Gramscian inspired volume entitled New Constitutionalism and World Order (Cambridge, 2014). The book brings together a selection of critical theorists and neo-Gramscians to analyze the disciplinary power of legal and constitutional innovations in the global political economy. Co-editor A. Claire Cutler has been a pioneer scholar detailing a neo-Gramscian theory of international law. Outside of North America, the so-called Amsterdam School around Kees van der Pijl and Henk Overbeek (at VU University Amsterdam) and individual researchers in Germany, notably in Düsseldorf, Kassel and Marburg as well as at the Centre for Global Political Economy at the University of Sussex in the United Kingdom and other parts of the world, have adopted the neo-Gramscian critical method. Christoph Scherrer at the University of Kassel is one of the leading neo-Gramscian theorists in Germany who introduced the concept of "double hegemony". He represents the critical global political economy approach in Germany.

== Basics of the neo-Gramscian perspective ==
In the mainstream approaches to international or global political economy, the theoretical primacy of the state is not in question. In contrast, neo-Gramscianism, using an approach which Henk Overbeek, Professor of International Relations at the VU University Amsterdam, calls transnational historical materialism, "identifies state formation and interstate politics as moments of the transnational dynamics of capital accumulation and class formation".

Neo-Gramscianism perceives state sovereignty as subjugated to a global economic system marked by the emergence of a transnational financial system and a corresponding transnational system of production. The major players in these systems, multinational corporations and international financial institutions such as the World Bank and International Monetary Fund, have evolved into a "transnational historic bloc" that exercises global hegemony (in contrast to the realist view of hegemony as the "predominant power of a state or a group of states"). The historic bloc acquires its authority through the tacit consent of the governed population gained through coercive techniques of intellectual and cultural persuasion, largely absent violence. It links itself to other social groups that have been involved in political struggles to expand its influence and seeks to solidify its power through the standardization and liberalization of national economies, creating a single regulatory regime (e.g. World Trade Organization).

There are powerful forces opposing the progress of this historic bloc who may form counterhegemonies to challenge it as part of an open-ended class struggle. These might include neo-mercantilists who depend on the protection of tariffs and state subsidies, or alliances of lesser developed countries, or identitarian and environmentalist movements in the industrialized West. If a counterhegemony grows large enough, it is able to subsume and replace the historic bloc it was born in. Neo-Gramscians use the Machiavellian terms "war of position" and "war of movement" to explain how this is possible. In a war of position, a counterhegemonic movement attempts through persuasion or propaganda to increase the number of people who share its view on the hegemonic order whereas in a war of movement the counterhegemonic tendencies which have grown large enough to overthrow, violently or democratically, the current hegemony and establish themselves as a new historic bloc.
