= James H. Mittelman =

American scholar and author (born 1944)

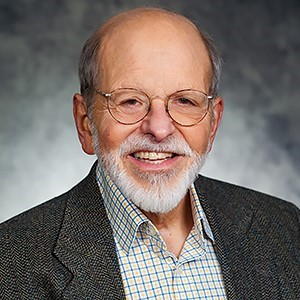
- James H. Mittelman, Distinguished Research Professor and University Professor Emeritus at American University, Washington, D.C.
- Born: James Howard Mittelman; November 29, 1944 (age 81)
- Title: Distinguished Research Professor and University Professor Emeritus
- Spouse: Linda J. Yarr

Academic background
- Education: Cornell University; Michigan State University

Academic work
- Institutions: American University
- Main interests: Globalization; Development; Political Economy; Global Governance
- Website: www.american.edu/sis/faculty/jmittel.cfm

James Howard Mittelman (born November 29, 1944) is an American scholar and author. Born in Marinette, Wisconsin, he spent much of his early life in Cleveland, Ohio. He is a political economist noted for his analyses of globalization and development. Mittelman is a Distinguished Research Professor and University Professor Emeritus at American University's School of International Service in Washington, D.C.

== Career ==
After studying at the University of East Africa in Kampala, Uganda, Mittelman obtained his doctorate from Cornell University in 1971. Subsequently, he was a professor at Columbia University; the University of Denver, where he served as dean of the Graduate School of International Studies (today the Korbel School) from 1983 to 1987; and the City University of New York, where he was dean of the Faculty of Social Science, Queens College from 1987 to 1991. Mittelman also has held teaching and research appointments in Japan, Mozambique, Singapore, South Africa, and Uganda. In addition, he held the Pok Rafeah Chair in International Studies from 1997 to 1999 at the National University of Malaysia, was a member of the Institute for Advanced Study from 1998 to 1999 in Princeton, New Jersey, and is currently an Honorary Fellow at the Helsinki Collegium for Advanced Studies at the University of Helsinki.

Mittelman has also served as the founding Director of the International Studies Program from 1981 to 1983 at The City College of the City University of New York, founding Chair of the Department of Comparative and Regional Studies from 1992 to 1994 at American University, and Vice President of the International Studies Association (ISA) from 2006 to 2007. In 2010, Mittelman was named the recipient of the ISA's Distinguished Scholar Award in International Political Economy, and in 2015 he was selected as an honoree of the ISA Global South Caucus. His books and articles have been translated into several languages, including Chinese, Japanese, Portuguese, and Spanish.

== Research interests ==
Mittelman's primary research interests include:

- Globalization
- Development with an emphasis on sub-Saharan Africa and Eastern Asia
- Political Economy
- Global Governance
- Knowledge and Power

== Selected publications ==
Date	Title	Publisher	Notes
2018	Implausible Dream: The World-Class University and Repurposing Higher Education	Princeton University Press	
2014	Social Theories of the Global	SAGE Publishing	co-edited with Paul James; Vol. 3 of Globalization and Politics
2011	Contesting Global Order: Development, Globalization, and Global Governance	Routledge	
2010	Hyperconflict: Globalization and Insecurity	Stanford University Press	Winner of Outstanding Academic Title Award in 2010
2004	Whither Globalization? The Vortex of Knowledge and Ideology	Routledge	
2001	Capturing Globalization	Routledge	co-edited with Norani Othman; Winner of the 2003 Gold Medal in the Social Sciences conferred by the National University of Malaysia
2000	The Globalization Syndrome: Transformation and Resistance	Princeton University Press	
1997	Out from Underdevelopment Revisited: Changing Global Structures and the Remaking of the Third World	Macmillan & St. Martin's Press	co-authored with Mustapha Kamal Pasha
1997	Innovation and Transformation in International Studies	Cambridge University Press	co-edited with Stephen Gill
1996	Globalization: Critical Reflections	Lynne Rienner Publishers	
1988	Out from Underdevelopment: Prospects for the Third World	Macmillan & St. Martin's Press	
1981	Underdevelopment and the Transition to Socialism: Mozambique and Tanzania	Harcourt Brace Jovanovich	
1975	Ideology and Politics in Uganda: From Obote to Amin	Cornell University Press	

== Other professional activities ==
Mittelman has worked at the United Nations and with civil society organizations. His op-eds, letters to the editor, and articles have appeared in The New York Times, The Washington Post, Financial Times, and elsewhere. He has made numerous appearances on radio and television.

== Personal life ==
Mittelman is married to Linda J. Yarr, a research professor at George Washington University. They have three children.
