= Janine Brodie =

Canadian political scientist and professor

- Born: Marion Janine Brodie; 1952 (age 73–74); Ontario, Canada
- Parent: Glenn Campbell Brodie
- Awards: Order of Canada

Academic background
- Education: BA., MA., University of Windsor; PhD., Political Science, 1981, Carleton University
- Thesis: Pathways to public office: Canadian women in the post-war years (1981)

Academic work
- Discipline: Political Science
- Institutions: Queen's University; York University; University of Alberta

Marion Janine Brodie CM FRSC (born 1952) is a Canadian political scientist. She is a Distinguished University Professor and a Canada Research Chair in Political Economy and Social Governance at the University of Alberta. Brodie was elected a Fellow of the Royal Society of Canada in 2002 and honoured with the Order of Canada in 2017.

== Education ==
She studied political science at the University of Windsor with the intent of continuing her education in law school. However, she was encouraged by one of her professors to pursue a Master's degree in political science. Her Master's, and eventual PhD, focused on women's role in politics.

== Career ==
While earning her PhD in Political Science from Carleton University in 1981, Brodie began teaching at Queen's University. She then taught at York University where she held the John Robarts Chair in Canadian Studies and was the Inaugural Director of the York Centre for Feminist Research. While at the university, she published a book titled Women and politics in Canada in 1985 which focused on gender-based differences in political parties and legislative offices. This book is regarded as the first to focus on women in politics between 1945 and 1975. Later, she also published The politics of abortion with Shelley A. M. Gavigan and Jane Jenson. Brodie was then hired as Chair of the Department of Political Science at the University of Alberta in 1997. From 1997 to 2004, she served in this role. During her time as Chair of the Department of Political Science, Brodie was a lead investigator in a major collaborative research initiatives program (MCRI) project entitled Globalization and its Challengers.

Brodie was elected as a Fellow of the Royal Society of Canada in 2002 and appointed as a Tier 1 Canada Research Chair in 2004 as she stepped down from her position as Chair of the Department of Political Science. Two years later, Brodie published Reinventing Canada politics of the 21st century with Linda Trimble. In 2008, Brodie edited a policy research paper with professor Isabella C. Bakker after consultation with the Policy Research Fund of Status of Women Canada. The paper, titled "Where Are the Women?", focused on gender within contemporary Canadian public policy and was published through the Canadian Centre for Policy Alternatives. As a result of her scholarly research on poverty and inequality, Brodie was named a 2010 Trudeau Fellow. The following year, Brodie became a Distinguished University Professor at the University of Alberta and was renewed as a Canada Research Chair. While simultaneously serving in these academic roles, Brodie served a five-year term as the Director of Social Science Division of the Royal Society of Canada.

She received the Queen Elizabeth II Diamond Jubilee Medal in 2013 and the Royal Society of Canada's Innis-Gérin Medal in 2014. She also edited the fifth edition of Critical concepts: an introduction to politics with Sandra Rein and Malinda Smith. The book focused on political issues and ethical dilemmas as they related to current political upheaval and global tensions. In September 2017, Brodie was the recipient of the University of Alberta's University Cup, an award given to their academic staff on the basis of outstanding scholarly research, teaching and service to the university and the community. She was also the winner of the Academic Women's Association Woman of the Year award. The following year, Brodie was named a member of the Order of Canada for her research in Canadian politics, public policy, social governance, and gender politics. She also edited a book titled Contemporary inequalities and social justice in Canada through the University of Toronto Press. The book was compiled of works from Alexa Degagné, Judy Fudge, Grace-Edward Galabuzi, Hayden King, Judy Rebick, David Robichaud, Meenal Shrivastava, and Malinda Smith which focused on the changing landscapes of Canadian society.

== Books ==
=== As author ===
- Brodie, M. Janine; Jenson, Jane (1980). Crisis, Challenge, and Change: Party and Class in Canada. Methuen. ISBN 978-0-458-93370-9.
  - Brodie, M. Janine; Jenson, Jane (1988). Crisis, Challenge, and Change: Party and Class in Canada Revisited (2nd ed.). Carleton University Press. ISBN 978-0-88629-074-0.
- Brodie, M. Janine (1985). Women and Politics in Canada. McGraw-Hill Ryerson. ISBN 978-0-075-48984-9.
- Brodie, M. Janine; Gavigan, Shelley A. M.; Jenson, Jane (1992). The Politics of Abortion. Oxford University Press. ISBN 978-0-19-540866-9.
- Brodie, M. Janine (1994). Politics on the Boundaries: Restructuring and the Canadian Women's Movement. Robarts Centre for Canadian Studies, York University. ISBN 978-1-55014-257-0. OCLC 31780804.
- Brodie, M. Janine (1995). Politics on the Margins: Restructuring and the Canadian Women's Movement. Fernwood Pub. ISBN 978-1-895-68647-0.
- Brodie, M. Janine; Bakker, Isabella (2008). Where are the Women? Gender Equity, Budgets and Canadian Public Policy. Canadian Centre for Policy Alternatives. ISBN 978-1-897569-05-4.

=== As editor ===
- Brodie, M. Janine, ed. (1996). Women and Canadian Public Policy. Harcourt Brace & Co. ISBN 978-0-7747-3459-2.
- Brodie, Janine, ed. (1999). Critical Concepts: An Introduction to Politics. Prentice Hall Canada. ISBN 978-0-130-82453-0.
  - Brodie, Janine, ed. (2001). Critical Concepts: An Introduction to Politics (2nd ed.). Prentice-Hall. ISBN 978-0-13-040928-7.
  - Brodie, M. Janine; Rein, Sandra (2005). Critical Concepts: An Introduction to Politics (3rd ed.). Pearson Prentice Hall. ISBN 978-0-13-123815-2. OCLC 54892159.
  - Brodie, M. Janine, ed. (2009). Critical Concepts: An Introduction to Politics (4th ed.). Pearson Prentice Hall. ISBN 978-0-132-23766-6.
  - Brodie, M. Janine; Rein, Sandra; Smith, Malinda S. (2014). Critical Concepts: An Introduction to Politics (5th ed.). Pearson. ISBN 978-0-13-276683-8. OCLC 808924416.
  - Brodie, Janine; Rein, Sandra; Smith, Malinda S., eds. (2023). Critical Concepts: An Introduction to Politics (6th ed.). Oxford University Press Canada. ISBN 978-0-199-03960-9.
- Brodie, M. Janine; Trimble, Linda J. (2003). Reinventing Canada: Politics of the 21st Century. Prentice Hall. ISBN 978-0-13-082634-3. OCLC 50754840.
- Griffin-Cohen, Marjorie; Brodie, Janine (2007). Remapping Gender in the New Global Order. Taylor & Francis Group. ISBN 978-1-135-98898-2.
- Brodie, M. Janine, ed. (2018). Contemporary Inequalities and Social Justice in Canada. University of Toronto Press. ISBN 978-1-4426-3409-1.
