= Louis W. Goodman =

Louis W. Goodman is a scholar in the field of international relations and the former Dean of the School of International Service at American University. He held the position for 25 years. He is a past president of The Association of Professional Schools of International Affairs.

== Background and career ==
Goodman earned his undergraduate degree in Latin American Literature from Dartmouth College, and his M.A. and Ph.D. in Sociology from Northwestern University.

Louis Goodman is professor at the School of International Service and served as its dean between 1986 and 2011. In 1992 served as the President of the Association of Professional Schools of International Affairs.

Prior to assuming this position, he directed the Latin America Program at the Woodrow Wilson International Center for Scholars and the Latin America and Caribbean Program at the Social Science Research Council and served on the faculty of Yale University’s Sociology Department. He has held visiting appointments at Tsinghua University (Beijing), the National University of Singapore, and Manipal University (India). He has been awarded Honorary Doctorates from San Martin de Porres University (Lima), the United Nations University for Peace (San Jose), and Ritsumeikan University (Kyoto). The author of numerous books and articles, Dr. Goodman's current research focuses on public goods and sustainable development and on democracy-building and civilian control of the armed forces in Latin America.

His Small Nations, Giant Firms: Capital Allocation Decisions in Transnational Corporations (Holmes and Meier: 1987) discusses the determinants of capital allocation decisions in transnational corporation and the impact of transnational corporations on national development. The Military and Democracy in Latin America (D.C. Heath-Lexington: 1990) and Lessons from the Venezuelan Experience (Johns Hopkins: 1995) are volumes he has co-edited which focus on the role of the military in political and economic development. His 21st Century Cooperation: Regional Public Goods, Global Governance & Sustainable Development, London & New York: Routledge, 2017 explains the importance of regional public goods for sustainable development. His publications also include works on international affairs education including International Affairs Education on the Eve of the 21st Century (APSIA, 1994).
