= Free Africa Foundation =

US-based think tank

- Formation: 1993
- Type: Think tank
- Location: Washington, D.C., United States
- President: George Ayittey
- Revenue: $84,400 (2015)
- Expenses: $99,100 (2015)
- Website: www.freeafrica.org

The Free Africa Foundation is a Washington, D.C.–based think tank founded by Ghanaian economist George Ayittey which criticizes corruption, oppression, and mismanagement in African governments, and advocates for democratic reform. Its board includes Makaziwe Mandela and Larry Diamond. Ayittey founded The Free Africa Foundation in 1993, to serve as a catalyst for reform in Africa.

The Foundation's website includes the Cato Institute, Earhart Foundation, John M. Olin Foundation and Foreign Policy Research Institute among its donors and sponsors.
