= Stephen Gill (political scientist) =

British-Canadian political scientist (born 1950)

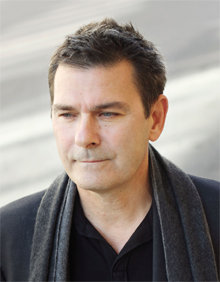
- Born: 1950 (age 75–76); England
- Citizenship: British/Canadian
- Scientific career
- Fields: Global Political Economy, International Relations, Social Theory, Political Science
- Workplaces: York University, University of Helsinki

Stephen Gill, FRSC (born 1950) is Distinguished Research Professor of Political Science at York University, Toronto, Ontario, Canada. He is known for his work in International Relations and Global Political Economy and has published, among others, Power and Resistance in the New World Order (2003, second edition 2008), Power, Production and Social Reproduction (with Isabella Bakker, 2003), Gramsci, Historical Materialism and International Relations (1993), American Hegemony and the Trilateral Commission (1990) and The Global Political Economy: Perspectives, Problems and Policies (with David Law, 1988).

Gill has been described as one of the Fifty Key Thinkers of International Relations and it is noted that "confining his thought to any discipline or sub-field unfairly diminishes the breadth of his work." His work has been translated into many languages, including French, German, Italian, Portuguese, Japanese and Finnish. His 2003 book Power and Resistance in the New World Order won the Outstanding Academic Title Award of Choice, the journal of the American Library Association.

== Biography ==
Gill was raised in Leeds, West Yorkshire, England and states that the British class system in which he grew up was one of the most important factors in shaping his political outlook: "This system helped forge a sense of injustice and resistance to illegitimate power that have been driving forces in much of my intellectual and political work." He attended City of Leeds School before leaving Yorkshire to enter higher education, studying a variety of subjects including English, French, Economics, Industrial Administration, Government and Politics and Education.

Gill cites Stephen Burman (now of the University of Sussex) and John N. Gray as two of his main influences during his university education. While reading for a doctoral degree in Sociology at Birmingham University, Gill was encouraged by Burman "to study transnational class formations and to begin to think about world order in a more complex way than orthodox theorizations of International Relations seemed to allow." This perspective has remained a distinctive feature of Gill's research and he is noted for the breadth of his work, which is influenced by a wide variety of theoretical approaches.

While studying part-time for his doctorate at Birmingham, Gill also held a full-time position as a lecturer at Wolverhampton Polytechnic (now University), where he formed a close working partnership with David Law, developing a "sociological perspective" on Global Political Economy which would culminate in the publication of their book, The Global Political Economy: Perspectives, Problems and Policies, in 1988. Griffiths et al. note that, "uniquely for its time, [it] gave serious attention to the entire theoretical spectrum of the field, including variants of Marxism and game theory as well as making novel arguments about the structural power of capital."

In 1990, Gill immigrated to Canada "as an intellectual refugee from Thatcherism" and took up a position as a professor in the Political Science department of York University, Toronto, where he worked with Robert W. Cox. He was made a Fellow of the Royal Society of Canada in 2003 and was awarded the title of Distinguished Research Professor in 2005. In 2003 he was elected vice-president of the International Studies Association. For the 2009–2010 academic year, he was the Erkko Visiting professor in Studies on Contemporary Society at the Helsinki Collegium for Advanced Studies, University of Helsinki.

== Research ==
Gill is considered one of the leading Neo-Gramscian International Relations scholars, although his work adopts his own distinctive historical materialist approach as a means of explaining global power and the changing world order. His work draws on Gramscian concepts such as American hegemony (for the Gramscian definition, see Hegemony), cultural hegemony and historic blocs, organic intellectuals and state-civil society.

=== American Hegemony and the Trilateral Commission ===
Gill's early work, American Hegemony and the Trilateral Commission (1991) introduced many of these concepts which were used to theorise and identify the global ruling class formations drawn from politics, the corporate world and civil society, and in particular the ideas of their leading thinkers ("organic intellectuals"). Gill showed how organisations such as the Trilateral Commission sought to develop a consensus among ruling class elements on how to extend the power of capital, to govern world capitalism, to defeat communism and to oppose and undermine state formations that refused integration into the capitalist world market. The book has been praised for its combination of theoretical and methodological innovation and described as a "classic study" of the changing structures of global power since 1945.

The book challenged the conventional wisdom of the 1980s, associated with Yale historian Paul Kennedy's The Rise and Fall of the Great Powers (1988), which argued that US hegemony was in decline in the 1980s and would likely decline further in the 1990s. Gill argued that US hegemony was reasserted during the 1980s, paving the way for neoliberal capitalism to expand globally in the 1990s under US leadership. Gill argued that a key reason for this was a complex ("historical bloc") of liberal institutions, ideas and elites which was part of a highly developed US-led alliance structure that helped to politically cement the main capitalist states' strategies towards adversaries as well as promoting the globalisation of capitalism. A review by Gaddis Smith in Foreign Affairs, the journal of the Trilateral Commission's sister organisation the Council on Foreign Relations, noted that "the discussion is mercifully free of the polemical, conspiratorial assumptions behind many studies of this subject."

=== Gramsci, Historical Materialism and International Relations ===
Gill's 1993 edited work, Gramsci, Historical Materialism and International Relations, which gathers together essays on Gramsci by authors including Gill, Cox, Kees van der Pijl and Giovanni Arrighi, is considered one of the key texts on Gramscian and Neo-Gramscian theory and has been credited with broadening the audience for Gramsci's work within the field of International Relations.

=== Power and Resistance in the New World Order and more recent work ===
In his more recent work, Gill has introduced new concepts such as disciplinary neoliberalism, new constitutionalism and market civilization and has drawn significantly on Michel Foucault’s theories of panopticism and capillary power. Gill's concept of market civilization helps to explain the formation of social subjects in the era of neo-liberalism, based on a reading of how market values, market forces and disciplines, privatisation, and the commodification of life forms are becoming increasingly pervasive, working into the very micro-practices of everyday life.

Gill’s collaboration with the noted feminist scholar Isabella Bakker in their edited work Power, Production and Social Reproduction: Human In/security in the Global Political Economy is an attempt to develop a radical re-conceptualisation of political economy. The authors state their aim "is to bring together theories and concepts from Feminist and Radical Political Economy and Critical International Studies, and to harness them to a more encompassing methodological and theoretical perspective with which to study some of the new conditions of existence in the global political economy. It seeks to provide a new approach based on an effort to synthesise the moments of power, production and social reproduction in patterns of intensified globalization." In a review for the journal Progress in Human Geography, critical geographer Helen Jarvis noted how the book identifies and explains "complex relationships simultaneously at work in global flows (of people and finance) and local practices (of production and social reproduction)," adding that "it moves beyond grand narratives of hegemonic neoliberalism, unraveling hidden circuits of inequality in the social reproduction of daily life."

== Major works ==
- The Global Political Economy: Perspectives, Problems and Policies with David Law. Brighton: Harvester Wheatsheaf & Baltimore: Johns Hopkins University Press, 1988. ISBN 0-8018-3764-2.
- Atlantic Relations: Beyond the Reagan Era. Brighton. Harvester Wheatsheaf & New York, St. Martin's. (Hardback only.), 1989. ISBN 0-312-03268-4.
- American Hegemony and the Trilateral Commission. Cambridge. Cambridge University Press, 1991. ISBN 0-521-42433-X.
- Gramsci, Historical Materialism and International Relations. Cambridge. Cambridge University Press, 1993. ISBN 0-521-43523-4.
- International Political Economy: Understanding Global Disorder with Robert W. Cox, Björn Hettne, James Rosenau, Yoshikazu Sakamoto & Kees van der Pijl. London: Zed Press, Halifax NS: Fernwood Press; Dhaka: University Press, 1995. ISBN 1-895686-58-X.
- Chiku Seiji no Saikochiku: Reisengo no Nichibeiou Kankei to Sekai Chitsujo (Restructuring Global Politics) In Japanese. Translated, with an editor's preface, by Seiji Endo. Tokyo: Asahi Shimbun Sha, 1996.
- Innovation and Transformation in International Studies with James H. Mittelman. Cambridge: Cambridge University Press, 1997. ISBN 0-521-59903-2.
- Globalization, Democratization and Multilateralism. Tokyo. United Nations University Press & London. Macmillan, 1997. ISBN 0-312-17283-4.
- Power and Resistance in the New World Order. London and New York: Macmillan-Palgrave, 2003. ISBN 1-4039-0390-5. Second edition, fully revised and updated, 2008. ISBN 9780230203693.
- Power, Production and Social Reproduction: Human In/security in the Global Political Economy with Isabella Bakker. London and New York: Macmillan-Palgrave, 2003. ISBN 1-4039-1793-0.
- Power and Resistance in the New World Order. Second fully revised, updated & enlarged edition. London and New York: Macmillan-Palgrave, 2008. ISBN 0-230-20370-1.
- Global Crises and the Crisis of Global Leadership. Cambridge. Cambridge University Press, 2011. ISBN 978-1-107-67496-7.
- New Constitutionalism and World Order with A. Claire Cutler. Cambridge. Cambridge University Press, 2014. ISBN 978-1-10705369-4.
