= Konstantin Khudoley =

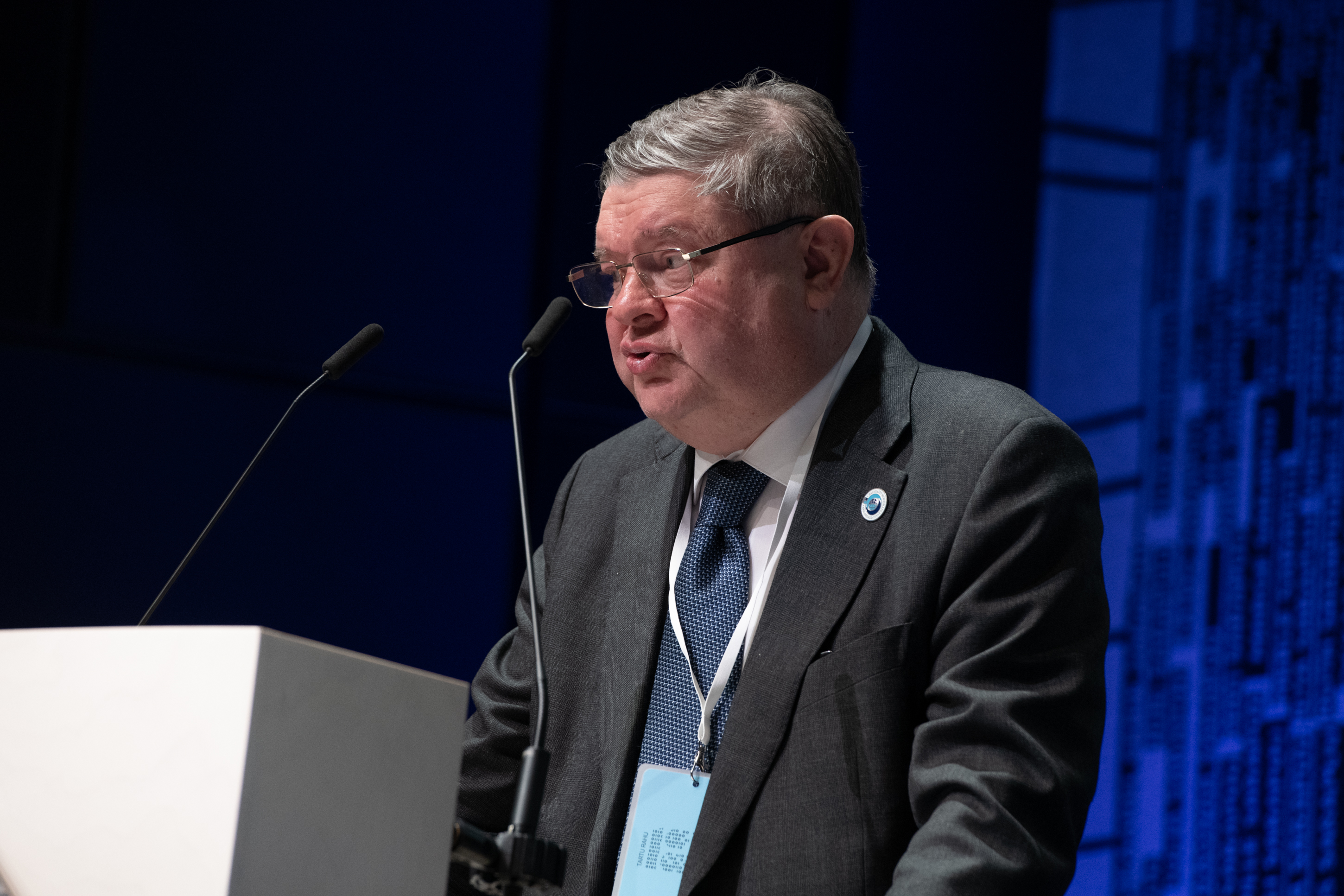
Konstantin Khudoley

Konstantin Konstantinowitsch Khudoley (1951) is a member of the steering committee of the Petersburg Dialogue and the vice rector, vice chairman of the science council and the manager of the Chair of European Studies in Saint Petersburg State University.

== Career ==
He is the secretary of the Russian Committee of Coordination and the leader of the Russian workgroup “Politics“in the russian-german forum „The Dialogue of Peterburg.“ Khudoley is one of the founders and a board member of the institute „North Dimension," which is an association connecting several universities, science and research centres on the respective subjects. Khudoley is a member of the United Nations University and a board member in multiple Russian and international professional and socio-political organizations. He regularly appears on Russian and foreign media.

== Academical career ==
His scientific interests are focused on the relations between Russia, EU and NATO. He is the author of multiple scientific publications that have been published in Russia as well as other European countries. Aspects covered in these articles include the mechanisms of cooperation and perspectives of development between Russia, EU and NATO. Also, the problems of cooperation in the Baltic region, the Russian policies on the Balkans and the general European cooperation in the field of education are covered. Lectures on these topics have been held by Khudoley on multiple high-ranking international conferences.
