= Economic Liberation Movement =

The Economic Liberation Movement (French: Mouvement de libération économique, abbreviated MLE) was a political party in Moyen-Congo, formed by European settlers who had arrived in the colony after the Second World War. The party contested the 1952 Moyen-Congo Representative Council election from the Brazzaville constituency. It thus pitted itself against the Gaullist RPF in contesting for the votes of the Brazzaville Europeans.

MLE was led by Christian Jayle. The party was made up by Jayle's associates; small merchants and journalists. The party called for complete free trade within the colony, and the promotion of small and medium-sized companies and removal of bureaucratic red tape and 'fiscal tyranny'.

In the 1956 French National Assembly election, Jayle contested from an African constituency with a new party (the "Party of the Frano-African Community"), receiving merely 757 votes out of 148 000.
