= George Ayittey =

Ghanaian economist and author (1945–2022)

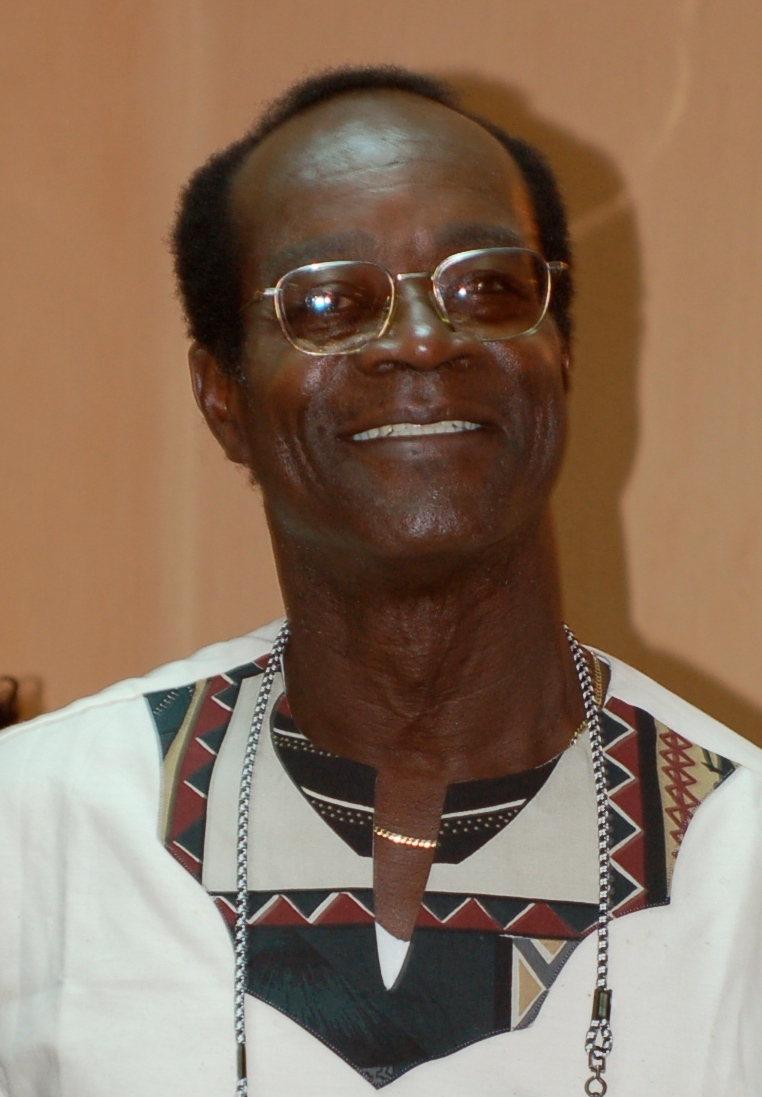
- Ayittey in June 2007
- Born: 13 October 1945
- Died: 28 January 2022 (aged 76)

Academic background
- Education: University of Manitoba; University of Western Ontario; University of Ghana

Academic work
- Discipline: Political economics
- Institutions: American University

George B. N. Ayittey (13 October 1945 – 28 January 2022) was a Ghanaian economist and author. He was president of the Free Africa Foundation in Washington, D.C., a professor at American University, and an associate scholar at the Foreign Policy Research Institute.

He championed the argument that "Africa is poor because she is not free," that the primary cause of African poverty is less a result of the oppression and mismanagement by colonial powers, but rather a result of modern oppressive native autocrats and socialist central planning policies. He also went beyond criticism of the status quo to advocate for specific ways to address the abuses of the past and present; specifically he called for democratic government, debt reexamination, modernized infrastructure, free market economics, and free trade to promote development.

== Early life and education ==
Ayittey attended Adisadel College in Cape Coast, Ghana for his secondary education. He obtained a B.Sc. in economics from the University of Ghana, in Legon, Ghana, a M.A. from the University of Western Ontario in London, Ontario, and a Ph.D. from the University of Manitoba in Winnipeg.

== Career ==
Ayittey taught at Wayne State College in Wayne, Nebraska and Bloomsburg University of Pennsylvania in Bloomsburg, Pennsylvania.

In 1988 and 1989, he held a National Fellowship at the Hoover Institution, and then joined The Heritage Foundation as a Bradley Resident Scholar. Ayittey served on the advisory board of Students for Liberty and also worked closely with the Atlas Network.

In 1993, he founded The Free Africa Foundation in 1993 to serve as a catalyst for reform in Africa. In 2008, Ayittey was listed by Foreign Policy as one of the "Top 100 Public Intellectuals" who "are shaping the tenor of our time."

=== Political views ===
Ayittey believed there are three keys to successfully rescuing Africa from oppressive despotism:

- First, he advocated forming coalitions consisting of small groups of "elders" who have no political ties and monitor the activities of the various opposition groups. Ayittey explains, "They must be able to reach out to all the opposition groups." "The council should bring all of the opposition into an alliance ", which would prevent dictators from overpowering severely divided competition.
- Second, people have to gain control of the civil service, security forces, judiciary, electoral commissions, media and central bank from the government. Ayittey saw control of at least one of these resources as central to subverting dictatorial power in African countries. Dictators throughout Africa staff these organizations with their families and cronies.
- Third, and finally, a nation has to use the correct sequence of reforms to disassemble the institutions. Intellectual reform should be first for freedom of expression and free media. Next, political reform for democratic pluralism. Then, constitutional reform to limit the powers of the executive. Then institutional reform, for an independent judiciary. Lastly, economic reform. Doing economic reform too early, he says, can be undermined by the civil service and might benefit only the leadership class and create oligarchs. Freeing the media first allows local people to support and advocate for reforms.

== Personal life ==
George Ayittey's younger sister was the politician Sherry Ayittey.

== Death ==
Ayittey died on 28 January 2022, at age 76. and was buried on 8 April 2022.

== Published works ==
- Indigenous African Institutions, Transnational Publishers, 1991; 2nd ed., 2004
- The Blueprint for Ghana's Economic Recovery, Africana Publishers, 1997
- Africa Betrayed, St. Martin's Press, 1992 (Africa Betrayed won the 1992 Mencken Award for Best Book.)
- Africa in Chaos, St. Martin's Press, 1998.
- Africa Unchained: the blueprint for development, Palgrave/MacMillan, 2004
- Defeating Dictators: Fighting Tyrants in Africa and Around the World published September 2011.
- Applied Economics for Africa, Atlas Network, 2018.
