= Cheryl Holcomb-McCoy =

Cheryl Holcomb-McCoy is CEO and President of the American Association of Colleges for Teacher Education (AACTE). She is the former Dean and still holds the rank of Distinguished Professor of Education in the School of Education at American University in Washington, DC. Previously, she was Vice Provost for Faculty Affairs at Johns Hopkins University (JHU), and a professor of Counseling and Human Development at the JHU School of Education. She was an affiliate faculty member in the Center for Africana Studies, Johns Hopkins University. Holcomb-McCoy is a graduate of Hampton (VA) High School.

At AU, Dr. Holcomb-McCoy founded the Summer Institute for Education, Equity and Justice (SIEEJ), a yearly institute designed for educators and education advocates who aim to ensure justice in education practice, research, and policies. Also at AU, Holcomb-McCoy serves as the interim director of the Center for Postsecondary Readiness and Success, a Center dedicated to research, professional development opportunities, and knowledge dissemination on improving the postsecondary opportunities for students who are historically disenfranchised and underrepresented on college campuses. The Center focuses on the research and practice of school-based counseling and advising professionals.

Before her tenure in the JHU Provost's Office, Holcomb-McCoy was Vice Dean of Academic Affairs and Chair of the Department of Counseling and Human Services at the JHU School of Education. Previously, she was an associate professor of Counselor Education at the University of Maryland, College Park and Assistant Professor and Director of the School Counseling Program at Brooklyn College of the City University of New York. She has a Ph.D. in Counseling and Educational Development from the University of North Carolina at Greensboro (1996), an MEd in School Counseling from the University of Virginia, School Counseling (1989), and a B.S. in Early Childhood Education from the University of Virginia (1986).

While at Johns Hopkins University, she developed and launched the Faculty Diversity Initiative, a $25 million, university-wide program.

Holcomb-McCoy specializes in measuring multicultural self-efficacy and cultural competence in school counseling, evaluating urban school counselor training and preparation, and examining counselor influence on low-income students' college readiness. She is an American Counseling Association (ACA) Fellow.

For many years, Holcomb-McCoy was an Associate Editor of the Journal of Counseling and Development. She has served on numerous journal editorial boards, including the Professional School Counseling Journal, Journal for Specialists in Group Work, and Journal for Social Action in Counseling and Psychology.

Holcomb-McCoy's book, "Beyond the Doll Tests, Affirming and Uplifting Black Students' Well-Being" (Harvard Education Press) will be available in March 2026. Also, she is the author of the book, "School Counseling to Close the Achievement Gap: A Social Justice Framework for Success" (2022; 2007, Corwin Press). The second edition entitled, "School Counseling to Close Opportunity Gaps: An Antiracist and Social Justice Framework (2022, Corwin) was launched in February 2022. Holcomb-McCoy's edited book, Antiracist Counseling in Schools and Communities (ACA Publishing), was released in November 2021.

Holcomb-McCoy is on the board of directors at WETA-PBS, Ed Forward DC, and Martha's Table in Washington DC. She is the Chair of the Board of Directors at Maya Angelou Schools in Washington DC. She is married to Alvin McCoy, III, and is the mother of two children.

Holcomb-McCoy served as a Faculty Lilly Fellow at the University of Maryland. In 2009, she was awarded the Mary Smith Arnold Anti-Oppression Award at the American Counseling Association conference. Because of her expertise in college counseling, Holcomb-McCoy was selected to participate as a consultant to the Obama Administration's Reach Higher Initiative. In July 2014, she was one of the plenary speakers at the White House's White House's Summit on Higher Education at Harvard University.

== Works ==
- Holcomb-McCoy, C. (2005). An examination of urban and suburban school counselors' familiarity with and usage of computer technology. Journal of Technology in Counseling, 4.
- Holcomb-McCoy, C. (2005). Ethnic identity in early adolescence: Implications and recommendations for middle school counselors. Professional School Counseling, 9, 120–127.
- Holcomb-McCoy, C. (2005). Social skills instruction with African American students: Implications for school counselors. Counseling Interviewer, 37, 10–17.
- Holcomb-McCoy, C. (in press). Transitioning to high school: Issues and challenges for African American students. Professional School Counseling.
- Holcomb-McCoy, C. & Lucas, A. (2006). The underachievement of African American students: Why can't we close the gap? The Counseling Interviewer.
- Holcomb-McCoy, C., & Adkinson-Bradley, C. (2005). African American counselors educators' job satisfaction and perceptions of departmental racial climate. Counselor Education & Supervision, 45, 2–15.
- Holcomb-McCoy, C. (2005). Investigating school counselors' perceived multicultural counseling competence. Professional School Counseling, 8, 414–423.
- Holcomb-McCoy, C. (2005). Empowerment of African American girls: A response. Professional School Counseling, 8, 390–391.
