= Vivian Maria Vasquez =

Professor of Education

- Education: Indiana University, Mount Saint Vincent University, University of Toronto, Lakehead University
- Occupation: Education Professor
- Employer: American University
- Known for: Education Research and author

Vivian Maria Vasquez is a professor at American University's School of Education in Washington, DC. She is the author of eleven books and multiple chapters in other books, as well as many articles in professional journals.

== Early life and education ==
Prior to becoming a university professor, Vasquez taught pre-school and in public schools for 14 years. Vasquez holds university degrees from the University of Toronto (Bachelor of Science, 1985), Lakehead University (Bachelor of Education, 1986), York University (Bachelor of Education In Service, 1990), Mount Saint Vincent University (Master of Arts, 1994), and Indiana University, Bloomington (Doctor of Education, 1999).

== Work ==
Vasquez's work has been described as working "in the classroom helping teachers guide young children toward being more critical learners. Her goal is to help all of us learn to listen more critically to what goes on around us." About her 2004 book Negotiating Critical Literacies with Young Children (ISBN 978-0415733175), it has been stated that she "stretched the boundaries of early childhood and of traditional schooling", and also that "through vibrant, memorable, and surprising examples of very young children grappling with very real social issues, Vivian Vasquez has transformed critical literacy in early childhood education."

Dr. Vasquez defines "critical literacy" as: "A critical literacy curriculum needs to be lived. It arises from the social and political conditions that unfold in communities in which we live. As such it cannot be traditionally taught. In other words, as teachers we need to incorporate a critical perspective into our everyday lives with our students in order to find ways to help children understand the social and political issues around them."

Vasquez's seminal work What Pokémon Can Teach Us about Learning and Literacy has been described as exploring "what engagement with popular culture texts could teach us about learning and literacy." In discussions of how "stories told to children can make a difference," scholars note that "research conducted by scholar Vivian Vasquez shows that young children play out or draw narratives in which they become part of the story."

Dr. Vasquez's work has been cited by worldwide scholars and journals over 1,200 times.

== Awards ==
In 2004 Vasquez was the first recipient of the American Educational Research Association (AERA) Teacher Research SIG Dissertation Award. Vasquez was also the 2005 winner of the James N. Britton Award, and her book Negotiating Critical Literacies with Young Children (ISBN 978-0415733175), won the 2006 AERA Division B Outstanding Book of the Year Award. In 2015 she was the keynote speaker at the National Association for Media Literacy Education conference.

She is a five-time winner of the Mellon Award for Research.

Most recently she was the 2019 National Council of Teachers of English (NCTE) Outstanding Elementary Educator in the English Language Arts Award.

== Books ==
- Long, S., Souto-Manning, M., Vasquez, VM. (Eds) (2016). Courageous Leadership in Early Childhood Education: Taking a Stand for Social Justice. N.Y.: Teachers College Press. 2016.
- Vasquez, V. Negotiating Critical Literacies with Young Children 10th Anniversary Edition. New York, N.Y.: Routledge Press. 2014.
- Vasquez, V., Tate, S., and Harste, J.C. Negotiating Critical Literacies with Pre-Service and In-Service Teachers. New York, N.Y.: Routledge Press. 2013.
- Vasquez, V., Wood, J., and Felderman, C. (Editors/Authors). Perspectives and Provocations in Early Childhood Education Volume 2. Charlotte, N.C.: Information Age Publishine/Early Childhood Education Assembly of NCTE. 2013.
- Vasquez, V. and Felderman, C. Technology and Critical Literacy in Early Childhood . New York, N.Y.: Routledge Press. 2013.
- Vasquez, V. and Wood, J. (Editors/Authors). Perspectives and Provocations in Early Childhood Education Volume I. Charlotte, N.C.: Information Age Publishing/ Early Childhood Education Assembly of NCTE. 2012.
- Vasquez, V. Getting Beyond I LIke the Book: Creating Spaces for Critical Literacy Across the Curriculum . Newark, DE: IRA. 2010.
- Vasquez, V., Egawa, K., with Harste, J.C. and Thompson, R. (Eds.). Literacy as Social Practice: Relocating Your Reading and Language Arts Curriculum. Urbana, IL: National Council of Teachers of English. 2004.
- Vasquez, V. Negotiating Critical Literacies with Young Children. Mahwah, N.J.: Routledge. 2004.
- Vasquez, V., with Muise, M., Nakai, D, Shear, J., Heffernan, L., Adamson, S. Getting Beyond I Like the Book: Creating Spaces for Critical Literacy in K-6 Classrooms . Newark, DE: IRA. 2003.
