= Laura Beers =

American author and historian

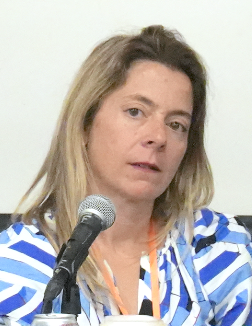
Laura Beers at Los Angeles Times Festival of Books 2025

Laura D. Beers FRHistS is an American author and historian. She is an associate professor of history at American University, where she researches modern Britain, mass media, and politics.

== Education ==
Beers earned a bachelor of arts, summa cum laude, in history from Princeton University in 2000. In 2003, she completed a master of arts in history from Harvard University. She completed a Ph.D. in history at Harvard in 2007. From October 2007 to September 2008, she was a postdoctoral fellow at University of Cambridge through funding from the Economic and Social Research Council. Beers was a postdoctoral fellow at Newnham College, Cambridge from October 2008 to August 2009.

== Career and research ==
Beers is an associate professor in the department of history at American University College of Arts and Sciences. She is an affiliate assistant professor in the American University School of International Service. She researches modern Britain and the way politics both influences and is influenced by cultural and social life. Beers explores mass media and modern society. She is the author or editor of four books. Beers speaks French, Italian, Spanish, and English.

== Awards and honors ==
Beers is a fellow of the Royal Historical Society. Beers is a 2025 Guggenheim Fellow.

== Selected works ==
- Beers, Laura (2010). Your Britain: Media and the Making of the Labour Party. Harvard University Press. ISBN 9780674050020.
- Beers, Laura; Thomas, Geraint, eds. (2012). Brave New World: Imperial and Democratic Nation-Building in Britain between the Wars. Institute of Historical Research. ISBN 978-1-909646-45-2.
- Beers, Laura (2016). Red Ellen: The Life of Ellen Wilkinson, Socialist, Feminist, Internationalist. Harvard University Press. ISBN 9780674971523.
- Beers, Laura (2024). Orwell's Ghosts: Wisdom and Warnings for the Twenty-First Century. Norton. ISBN 978-1-324-07508-0.
