= Alida Anderson =

American educator

Professor Alida Anderson
- Education: University of Maryland; Northwestern University; Colgate University
- Occupation: Professor
- Employer: American University
- Known for: Educational research

Alida Anderson is a professor at the School of Education at American University in Washington, DC, where she has been since 2009,an award winning visual artist, and a former world-class triathlete who twice represented the United States at World Championships.

== Education ==
Anderson attended Sidwell Friends School in Washington, DC (1987), and holds a BA, Art/Art History and Asian Studies, Colgate University, Hamilton, NY, an MA, Learning Disabilities, Northwestern University, Evanston, IL, and a PhD, Special Education, from the University of Maryland, College Park, MD.

== Research ==
Anderson is a widely published academic researcher, whose work focuses on multiple areas of research in special education and the arts, as well as "cross-linguistic correlation of dyslexia."

She is the co-editor of The Journal of the Arts and Special Education, a publication of the Division of the Visual and Performing Arts of the Council for Exceptional Children.

One of her 2019 co-authored publications, "International Report: Neuromyths and Evidence-Based Practices in Higher Education." (has been characterized as "this study includes not only answers to important research questions, but practice-oriented information that is useful for pedagogy, course design, and leadership, as well as for further research on this topic.", and the earlier (2017) publication on the same general subject, "Dispelling the Myth: Training in Education or Neuroscience", described as "the implications of these new findings are very relevant to the way we teach in the classroom.", and also noted that this research affirmed "that neuromyth beliefs are remarkably prevalent, but that training in education and neuroscience helped to reduce these false beliefs."

Her earlier research study, "Dance/Movement Therapy’s Influence on Adolescents Mathematics, Social-Emotional and Dance Skills", has been described as "integrating dance and movement therapy into math lessons for students with learning disabilities, emotional/behavioral disabilities and/or attention deficit hyperactivity disorder (ADHD), [which] led to improvements in math as well as SEL [Social-Emotional Learning] skills, such as motivation, engagement, attention and self-regulation", and concluded that "the findings were significant because students with those special needs often show anxiety toward learning math."

Anderson was also the lead author in a 2020 seminal article titled "A Review of Online Dyslexia Learning Modules", which focused on discrediting the "Dyslexia Myth" of "Backwards Reading."

She is the editor of the book "Arts Integration and Special Education: An Inclusive Theory of Action for Student Engagement." The book has been described as "the first book to posit explanations for how and why arts integration facilitates learning in students with language and sensory processing disorders and those at risk for failure due to low socioeconomic conditions."

Anderson defines her interpretation of "arts integration" as “the use of an art form (drama, dance, visual arts, etc.) in combination with teaching of a content area (math, science, social studies, language arts, etc.), in which there are content learning objectives in the art form as well as in the content area.”

In 2020 Anderson was credited as being one of the "thinkers" who, together with the Arts Education Partnership in Denver, Colorado, "began exploring intersections of arts education and literacies" that led to the eventual creation of an online resource that "incorporates art and text to support different experiences and interactions as you explore the relationships between art, arts education and literacies."

“There are multiple ways to express an idea—many of which are not linguistic. By expressing an idea through visual, auditory, kinesthetic and/or tactile sensory information, a child has more ways to map that concept onto language forms”. Dr. Alida Anderson in Psychology Today

In 2026, her second book, "Identity-Affirming Arts Integration and Special Education - Inclusion Through Belonging," was published by Routledge. The book has been described as introducing "a transformative approach to special education by integrating identity-affirming arts into teaching practices. Using critical frameworks, the book demonstrates how arts integration can enhance adolescent students’ linguistic, cognitive, and emotional engagement in content area and literacy learning."
