= American University School of Education =

University in the United States

The Linda A. and H. Kent Baker School of Education at American University is accredited by the Council for the Accreditation of Educator Preparation (CAEP) and by the Office of the State Superintendent of Education (OSSE). The school offers undergraduate, master's, and doctoral degrees, as well as a post-masters graduate certificate in "Anti-Racist Administration and School Leadership."

The school also runs a Center For Postsecondary Readiness and Success which "concentrates its research, professional development opportunities, and knowledge dissemination on improving the postsecondary opportunities for students who are historically disenfranchised and underrepresented on college campuses", and an Institute for Innovation in Education, which "conducts educational and translational research and administers research-informed professional development initiatives to improve teaching and learning in Washington, DC and beyond."

In April 2026, the Baker School of Education launched the National Center for Advancing College Teaching for Student Success (ACTSS), led by higher education expert, Professor Corbin M. Campbell, and in partnership with the Lumina Foundation, the ECEM Foundation, and other university and college partners. The center has a mission "to elevate and nurture teaching excellence systemically across US higher education."

The Baker School of Education is located in the American University's Spring Valley Building, at 4801 Massachusetts Avenue, NW, about one mile from the main campus. Campus shuttle buses provide transportation to and from the main university campus, and the Tenleytown-AU stop on the WMATA Red Line.

== History ==
For many decades, the School of Education was part of American University's College of Arts and Sciences (CAS), and it became a separate and independent school on July 1, 2019. Cheryl Holcomb-McCoy, who had been the Vice Provost for Faculty Affairs at Johns Hopkins University (JHU), and a Professor of Counseling and Human Development at the JHU School of Education, was hired as the School of Education's first Dean.

In 2025, Kogod School of Business graduate and professor, H. Kent Baker, gifted American University the single largest individual donation in the university's history to the School of Education. On January 29 of that year, the Board of Trustees voted to rename the school in honor of Baker and his wife, Linda. Nearly one year after the Board of Trustees voted to name the school, Professor Baker passed away after what university officials described as a "brief illness," re-joining his wife Linda.

On Thursday, April 23, 2026, the American University community came together to officially name and dedicate the university's education school as the Linda A. & H. Kent Baker School of Education. Numerous alumni, faculty, staff, and students were present, alongside campus leadership including the Provost and University President.

Since the school became independent from the CAS, the quality of academics and student rigor have climbed. The Baker School of Education currently ranks as the #1 School of Education in Washington, DC, and the #1 Master's of Education in Washington, DC; the Education Master's also ranks #31 in the United States.

== Notable faculty ==
- Cheryl Holcomb-McCoy - former School of Education dean and consultant to President Barack Obama's Reach Higher Initiative.
- Vivian Vasquez - author of eleven books and numerous book chapters and articles as well as the National Council for Teacher Education's 2019 Outstanding Elementary Educator in the English Language Arts Award winner.
- Sarah Irvine Belson - executive director of the Institute for Innovation in Education and former Dean of the School of Education, Teaching & Health at American University from 2002-2015.
- Corbin Campbell - Associate Dean of Academic Affairs and Associate Professor at the School of Education, whose research has been highlighted in NPR, The Wall Street Journal, and The New York Times.
- Alida Anderson - widely published academic researcher, author, and co-editor of The Journal of the Arts and Special Education, a publication of the Division of the Visual and Performing Arts of the Council for Exceptional Children.
- Stephen Vassallo - author of Critical Educational Psychology (2017) and Neoliberal Selfhood (2020).
