= Celine-Marie Pascale =

American sociologist

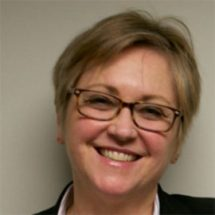
- Occupation: Professor emerita

Academic work
- Discipline: Sociologist
- Institutions: American University College of Arts and Sciences
- Website: cmpascale.org

Celine-Marie Pascale is an American sociologist and author. She is professor emerita of sociology at the American University College of Arts and Sciences.

== Education ==
Pascale has a BA Communications from Glassboro State College, a MA in Social Science from San Jose State University, and a PhD in sociology, with a certificate in Women's Studies, from the University of California, Santa Cruz.

== Career ==
Pascale joined the American University College of Arts and Sciences in 2003 and received tenure and was promoted to associate professor in 2009, before being further promoted to professor of sociology in 2013. Her first book, Making Sense of Race, Gender and Class: Commonsense, Power and Privilege in the United States (Routledge, 2007), won the American Sociological Association's Distinguished Contribution to Scholarship Book Award in 2008. In it she examines how common-sense knowledge is constructed, using her findings "to uncover routine assumptions that underlie meaning-making processes around race, gender, and class". The work was praised for its triangulation of empirical data with post-structural discourse analysis and ethnomethodology. Her subsequent book Cartographies of Knowledge: Exploring Qualitative Epistemologies (Sage, 2010), received the International Congress of Qualitative Inquiry's Distinguished Book Award in 2011. In 2021, Pascale published her book Living on the Edge. She wrote in the preface that the book was to detail the lives of "ordinary people" in the poorest regions of the United States and to highlight the ways that "business practices and government policies create, normalize and entrench economic struggles for many in order to produce extreme wealth for a few."

== Books ==
- Making Sense of Race, Gender and Class: Commonsense, Power and Privilege in the United States (Routledge, 2007)
- Cartographies of Knowledge: Exploring Qualitative Epistemologies (Sage 2011)
- Social Inequalities & The Politics of Representation: A Global Landscape (2013)
- Living on the Edge: When Hard Times Become A Way of Life (Polity, 2021)
