= Harold and Sylvia Greenberg Theatre =

Theatre at American University in Washington, DC

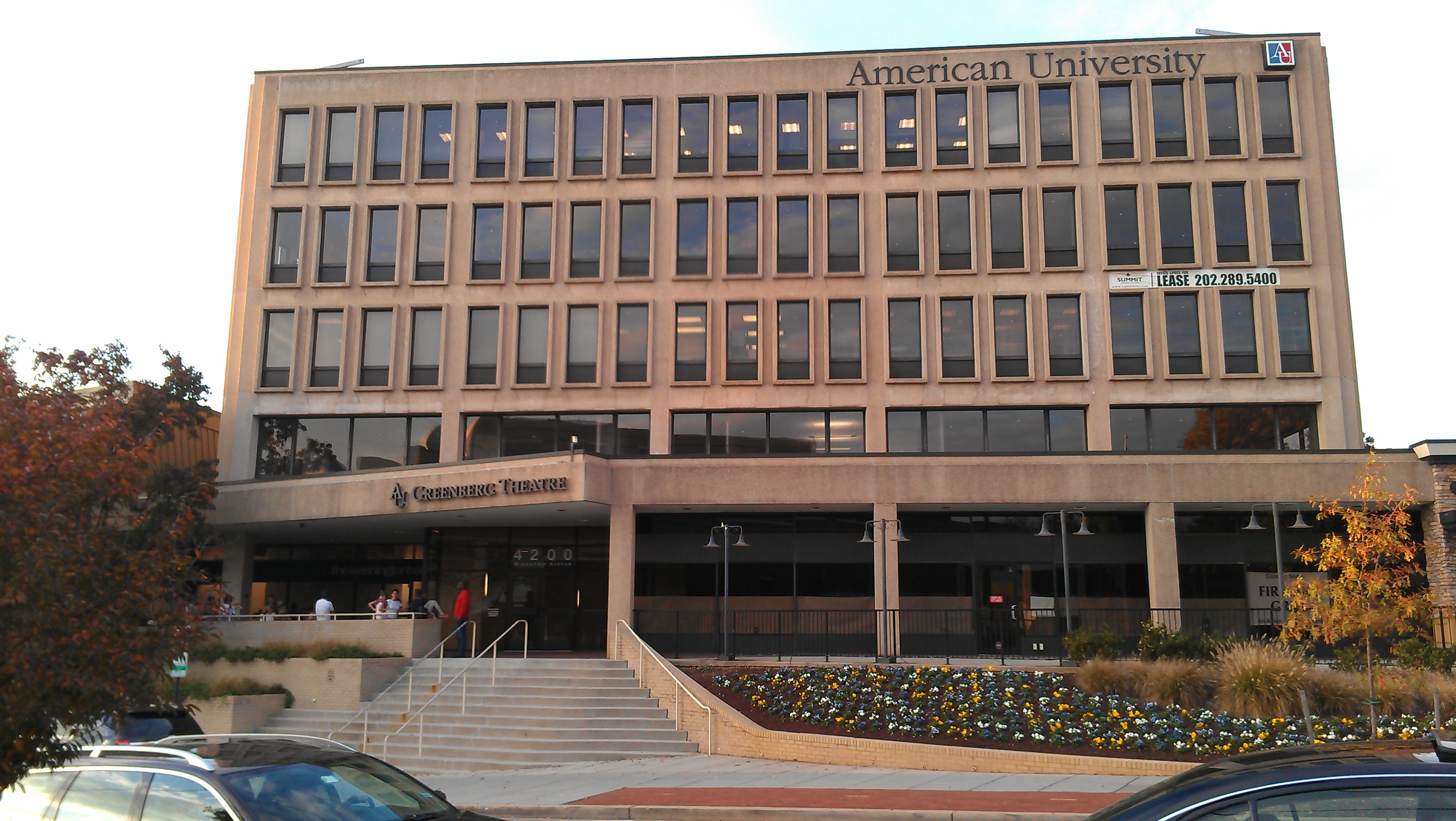
- Entrance on Van Ness Street.

- Location within Washington, D.C.
- Address: 4200 Wisconsin Ave; Washington, D.C. United States
- Coordinates: 38.9436°N 77.0777°W

Construction
- Opened: 2003

Website
- https://www.american.edu/cas/greenberg/

The Harold and Sylvia Greenberg Theatre (Greenberg Theatre) at American University is located in Tenleytown, Washington, DC. It opened in March 2003 with the mission of providing the University and civic community a place to experience live performances in music, theatre and dance. The theatre's construction was made possible by a gift from Harold and Sylvia Greenberg.
