= United Methodist Church higher education =

Schools, colleges, and universities are related to the United Methodist Church through the General Board of Higher Education and Ministry. In 2022, there are a total of 107 UM-Affiliated schools, colleges, and universities. In 2021, there were 108, as shown on this map of UM-Affiliated institutions in the U.S. and Puerto Rico.

The schools are identified and reviewed by the University Senate of the United Methodist Church as having met criteria for institutional integrity, well-structured programs, sound management and clearly defined church relationships. Some of the schools are related to the church primarily through historic associations with Methodism while others have current active affiliations. All affiliated institutions have been identified as having affirmed the Education Covenant of Partnership at the 2000 General Conference of the United Methodist Church.

All schools, colleges/universities, and seminaries without regard to affiliation but with a historical relationship to the Church have been members of the National Association of Schools, Colleges and Universities of the United Methodist Church. In July 2020, that organization became more inclusive and changed its name to the North American Association of Methodist Schools, Colleges and Universities (NAAMSCU). With the changes, the organization welcomes educational institutions that are not United Methodist-affiliated but do have a Methodist background or are affiliated with another Wesleyan denomination, such as the African Methodist Episcopal Church. Affiliated institutions are also listed as members of the International Association of Methodist-related Schools, Colleges, and Universities (IAMSCU). Some (although not all) are actively involved with the University Senate of the United Methodist Church.

== The Black College Fund ==
One of the most significant ways The United Methodist Church helps make quality education accessible to all is through the Black College Fund (BCF). The fund supports the 11 historically black colleges and universities (HBCUS) related to the church – the largest number of black colleges and universities receiving funding from any church body in the United States. The Black College Fund does not offer scholarships. Instead, the fund gives the participating colleges the finances they need to help students have a successful college experience. The Black College Fund helps support college staff and faculty who can serve as strong intellectual, cultural and spiritual mentors. Students can apply for direct scholarships and loans through GBHEM’s Office of Loans and Scholarships.

== Methodist Global and Regional Education Associations ==
GBHEM helps connect Methodist-related and Methodist-affiliated higher education institutions across the globe. Explore our full listing of global and regional educational associations below.

=== International ===
- IAMSCU: International Association of Methodist-related Schools, Colleges and Universities.
- MISEN: Methodist International Student Exchange Network.

=== Africa ===
- AAMIHE: African Association of Methodist Institutions of Higher Education.
- AAUMTI: African Association of United Methodist-related Theological Institutions.

=== The Americas ===
- ALAMEI: Latin American Association of Methodist Educational Institutions.
- AUMTS: Association of United Methodist Theological Schools.
- NASCUMC: National Association of Schools and Colleges of the United Methodist Church.

=== Asia and the Pacific ===
- APAMEI: Asia-Pacific Association of Methodist Educational Institutions.
- PAMSCUS: Philippine Association of Methodist Schools, Colleges, Universities and Seminaries.

=== Europe and Eurasia ===
- MTSE: Methodist Theological Schools in Europe.

== GBHEM Resources and Curriculum ==
The Awakened Life: The Awakened Life is an eight-week small group curriculum designed to equip chaplains, collegiate ministers and spiritual leaders in helping college students navigate emotional disturbance, build resiliency and learn psychosocial skills. It is a resource that helps to foster mental, emotional and spiritual well-being using mindfulness techniques. Research demonstrates that mindfulness practices contribute to improved mood, concentration and relationships; and with its rich contemplative history, our faith tradition has much to add to this conversation. This curriculum training is offered in both virtual and in-person retreats. CEU credits are available for U.S. registrants only.

Francis Asbury Award: Named for early American Methodist Bishop Francis Asbury, this award honors his call to establish a school in the vicinity of every church. “We must,” he said, “ … give the key of knowledge to your children, and those of the poor in the vicinity of your small towns and villages.” Today, the award recognizes United Methodist individuals who have made a significant contribution to fostering United Methodist ministries in higher education at the local, district or annual conference level. It is awarded annually to one honoree per annual conference.

The Awakened Traveler: Whether you are a solo traveler or prefer to travel in groups, whether your next excursion will take you across the globe or into a neighboring community, The Awakened Traveler, is a fun, interactive adventure designed to help you and your friends think more deeply about the spirituality of travel.
