= Linda Aldoory =

U.S. academic administrator

- Education: George Washington University; University of Texas at Austin; Syracuse University
- Scientific career
- Fields: Health communications
- Institutions: University of Maryland, College Park; American University College of Arts and Sciences

Linda Aldoory is an American academic administrator and heath communications professor. She has served as the dean of the American University College of Arts and Sciences and a professor of health studies since July 2022.

== Life ==
Aldoory completed a B.A. in psychology at George Washington University in 1988. She earned a M.A. in journalism from the University of Texas at Austin in 1991. Aldoory completed a Ph.D. in public communications at Syracuse University in 1998.

Aldoory worked in various public relations positions including with the Bronx Perinatal Consortium, Hill and Knowlton, and the American Psychiatric Association.

Aldoory worked for the University of Maryland, College Park for over twenty years. From 2011 to 2015, Aldoory was the endowed chair and director of the Herschel S. Horowitz Center for Health Literacy and an associate professor in behavioral and community health at the University of Maryland School of Public Health. She later became a professor of communications and the associate dean for research and programming at the University of Maryland College of Arts and Humanities. She researches health campaigns and health communication. Aldoory was director of the Center for Humanities Research and served as a diversity officer and equity administrator University of Maryland.

In July 2022, Aldoory became dean of the American University College of Arts and Sciences. She succeeded interim dean Max Paul Friedman. She is a professor of health studies. Aldoory is past president of the Association for Education in Journalism and Mass Communication.

== Selected works ==
- Toth, Elizabeth L.; Aldoory, Linda, eds. (2001). The Gender Challenge to Media: Diverse Voices from the Field. Hampton Press. ISBN 978-1-57273-309-1.
- Aldoory, Linda; Toth, Elizabeth L. (2021). The Future of Feminism in Public Relations and Strategic Communication: A Socio-ecological Model of Influences. Rowman & Littlefield. ISBN 978-1-5381-2823-7.
