= American University College of Arts and Sciences =

Part of the American University in Washington, D.C.

Coordinates: 38.9370554°N 77.0869224°W

College of Arts and Sciences
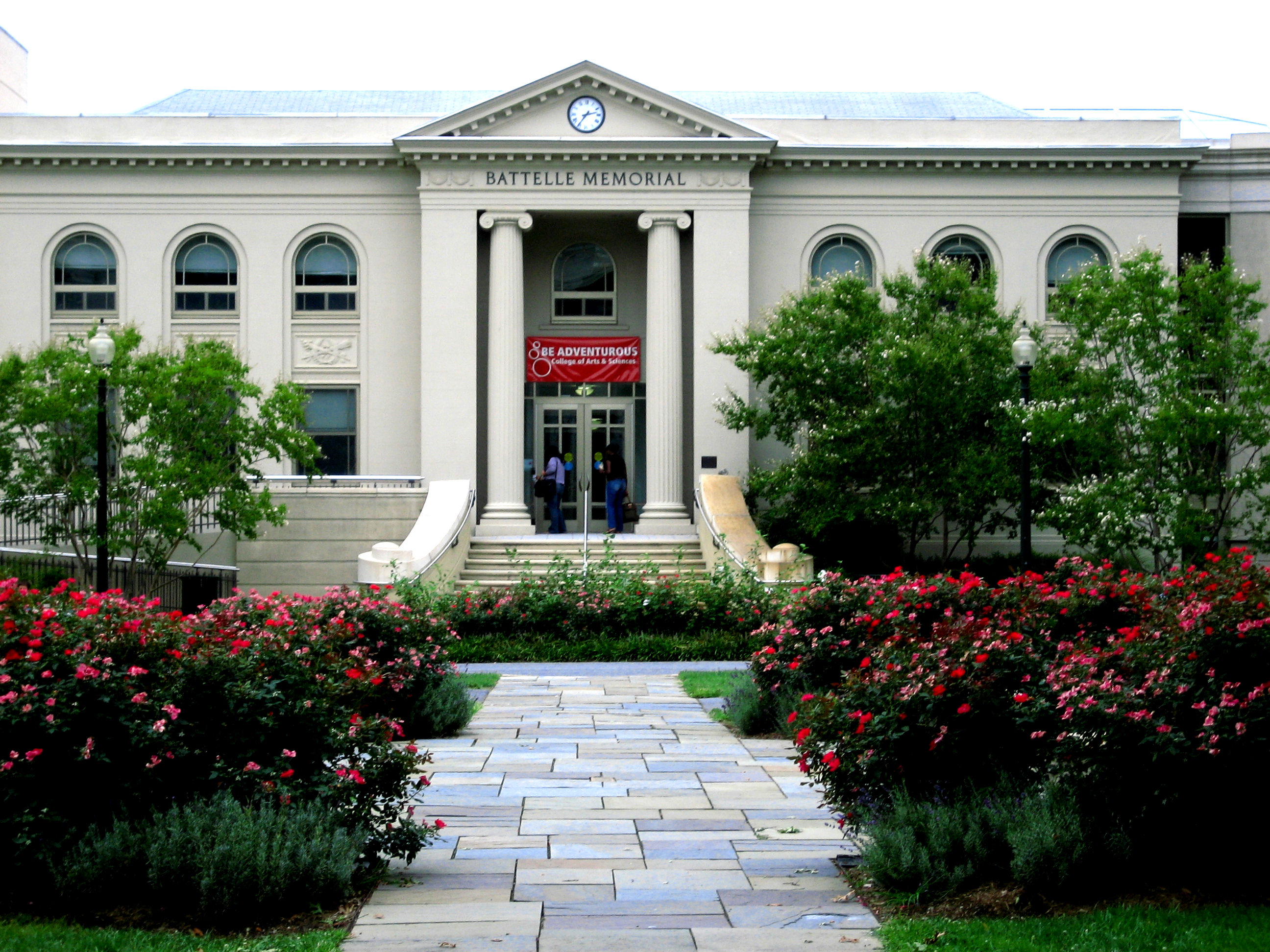
- The Battelle-Thompkins Building, the location of the College of Arts and Sciences on American University's campus
- Other name: CAS
- Type: Private
- Established: 1893
- Dean: Linda Aldoory
- Faculty: 212 (full-time)
- Students: 1,650 (undergraduate)/ 1,050 (graduate)
- Location: Washington, District of Columbia, United States
- Campus: Urban
- Website: http://www.american.edu/cas/

The College of Arts and Sciences is the oldest and largest academic unit at American University in terms of student enrollment and faculty lines. It was established in 1893. It offers more than 50 masters, doctoral, and certificate programs. The College of Arts and Sciences faculty includes nationally and internationally noted artists, scholars, and teachers, as well as students from all 50 states and 150 countries. It also administers the Katzen Arts Center and the Greenberg Theatre.

== History ==
The "College of Liberal Arts," as it was originally known, was first housed at Hurst Hall. The official name of the college changed several times in the mid-twentieth century:

- In 1939, it first took its current name as the "College of Arts and Sciences"
- The name briefly changed again in 1953, becoming the "Undergraduate College"
- Finally, in 1959, the name returned to the "College of Arts and Sciences"

During World War II, the American Red Cross' training program, Overseas and Domestic Workers School, was also housed in Hurst Hall.

The Dean's Office of the College of Arts and Sciences moved into the Asbury Building in 1960, where it remained until 1966. Gray Hall was home to the College of Arts and Sciences until the fall of 2001. It is currently housed in Battelle-Tompkins.

The Harold and Sylvia Greenberg Theatre was opened in 2003 and the Katzen Arts Center was opened in 2006.

== List of deans ==
- Peter Starr
- Max Paul Friedman (interim), June 2020-July 2022
- Linda Aldoory, July 2022 to present

== Notable faculty ==
- Laura Beers, historian, author
- Allan Lichtman , America historian, political analyst
