= Consortium for Undergraduate International Business Education =

Network of higher education institutions

The Consortium for Undergraduate International Business Education (CUIBE) is a network of member universities, with the goal of promoting international business education. It places special emphasis on undergraduate education, and membership in it has been used as an educational quality indicator for new program development in other universities.

CUIBE was established in 2003, and has been recognized in the U.S. as a “significant advocate for international education”. Member universities undergo a substantial program review, including an on-campus site visit, before they are accepted into the consortium as full members. Membership in CUIBE has been used as a basis for the development of a benchmarking methodology for empirical research on international business education practices.

Most of the CUIBE member universities have received funding from the Center for International Business Education and Research (CIBER), at the U.S. Department of Education; and several of the founding schools - such as the University of South Carolina, San Diego State University, and Northeastern University - have been recognized as models for foreign language training in international business education.
