= International Association of Methodist-related Schools, Colleges, and Universities =

International non-profit organization

International Association of Methodist-related Schools, Colleges, and Universities (IAMSCU) is a private, not-for-profit organization of schools, colleges and universities associated with Methodist-Wesleyan tradition. All the member institutions have a current or historical affiliation with a Methodist denomination. Most institutions are legally autonomous under their own boards of trustees and separately chartered by their respective states. IAMSCU seeks to enable Methodist-related educational institutions and those with a Methodist tradition to cooperate through the development of common understandings.

IAMSCU was founded in 1991 at the World Methodist Conference in Singapore.

== US member schools ==
- Adrian College
- Alaska Pacific University
- Albion College
- Albright College
- Allegheny College
- American University
- Andrew College
- Baker University
- Baldwin Wallace University
- Bennett College
- Bethune-Cookman University
- Birmingham-Southern College
- Boston University
- Brevard College
- Centenary College of Louisiana
- Centenary University
- Central Methodist University
- Claflin University
- Clark Atlanta University
- Columbia College (South Carolina)
- Cornell College
- Dakota Wesleyan University
- University of Denver
- DePauw University
- Dickinson College
- Dillard University
- Drew University
- Duke University
- Emory University
- Emory and Henry University
- University of Evansville
- Ferrum College
- Florida Southern College
- Greensboro College
- Hamline University
- Hendrix College
- High Point University
- Hiwassee College – closed 2019
- Huntingdon College
- Huston–Tillotson University
- Illinois Wesleyan University
- University of Indianapolis
- Iowa Wesleyan University - closed 2023
- Kansas Wesleyan University
- Kendall College
- Kentucky Wesleyan College
- LaGrange College
- Lambuth University - closed 2011
- Lebanon Valley College
- Lindsey Wilson University
- Lon Morris College
- Louisburg College
- Lycoming College
- MacMurray College - closed 2020
- Martin Methodist College - state school as of 2021
- McKendree University
- McMurry University
- Meharry Medical College
- Methodist University
- Millsaps College
- Morningside University
- University of Mount Union
- Nebraska Methodist College
- Nebraska Wesleyan University
- North Carolina Wesleyan University
- North Central College
- Northwestern University
- Ohio Northern University
- Ohio Wesleyan University
- Oklahoma City University
- Otterbein University
- Oxford College of Emory University
- University of the Pacific
- Paine College
- Pfeiffer University
- Philander Smith University
- Randolph-Macon College
- Randolph College
- Reinhardt College
- Rocky Mountain College
- Rust College
- Shenandoah University
- Simpson College
- Southern Methodist University
- Southwestern College (Kansas)
- Southwestern University
- Spartanburg Methodist College
- Syracuse University
- Tennessee Wesleyan University
- Texas Wesleyan University
- Union Commonwealth University
- University of Puget Sound
- Virginia Wesleyan University
- Wesley College (Delaware) – acquired in 2021
- Wesleyan College
- West Virginia Wesleyan College
- Wiley University
- Willamette University
- Wofford College
- Young Harris College
