= American University =

Private university in Washington, D.C.

- Motto: Pro deo et patria (Latin)
- Motto in English: "For God and Country"
- Type: Private federally chartered research university
- Established: February 24, 1893; 133 years ago
- Founder: John Fletcher Hurst
- Accreditation: MSCHE
- Religious affiliation: United Methodist Church
- Academic affiliations: CUMU; CUWMA; CONAHEC; IAMSCU; NAICU; Space grant; CUIBE
- Endowment: $1.12 billion (2025)
- President: David Marchick (interim)
- Provost: Vicky M. Wilkins
- Students: 13,019 (fall 2023)
- Undergraduates: 7,571 (fall 2023)
- Postgraduates: 3,613 (fall 2023)
- Other students: 1,835 (fall 2023)
- Location: Washington, D.C., United States; 38.9371°N 77.0869°W
- Campus: Large City, 90 acres (36 ha)
- Newspaper: The Eagle
- Colors: Red; Blue; White
- Nickname: Eagles
- Sporting affiliations: NCAA Division I – Patriot League; EIWA
- Mascot: Clawed Z. Eagle
- Website: american.edu

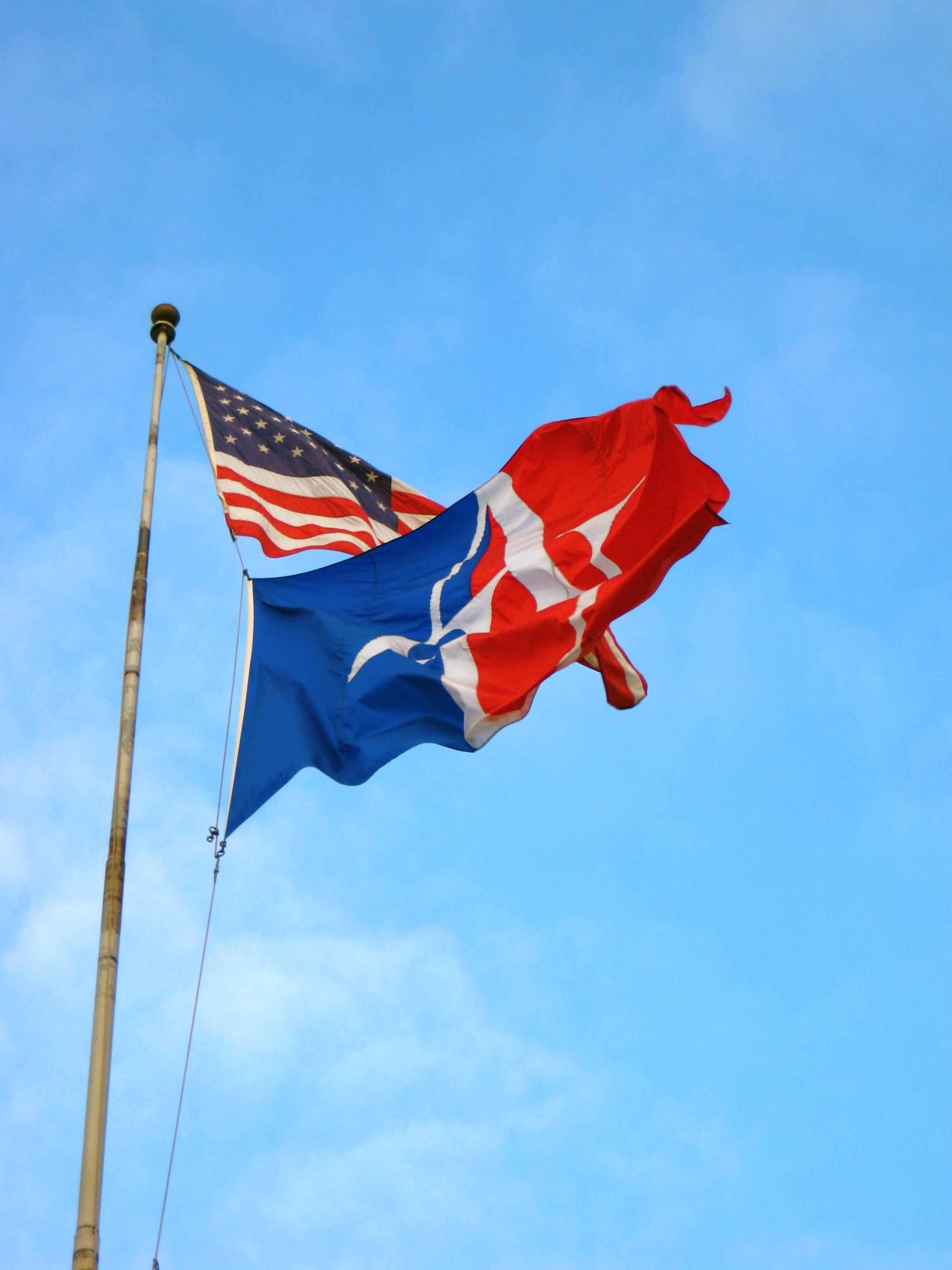
The American University flag

The American University (AU or American) is a private federally chartered research university in Washington, D.C., United States. Its main campus spans 90 acres (36 ha) on Ward Circle, in the Spring Valley and Tenleytown neighborhoods of Northwest D.C.

American was chartered by an Act of Congress in 1893 at the urging of Methodist bishop John Fletcher Hurst, who sought to create an institution that promoted public service, internationalism, and pragmatic idealism. The university was founded by the General Conference of the Methodist Episcopal Church as a national Methodist institution. It remains affiliated with the United Methodist Church, however, religious affiliation is not a criterion for admission, employment, nor an academic requirement. AU broke ground in 1902, opened as a graduate education institution in 1914, and admitted its first undergraduates in 1925.

AU consists of eight schools and colleges: the School of International Service; the College of Arts and Sciences; the Kogod School of Business; the School of Communication; the School of Professional and Extended Studies; the School of Public Affairs; the Linda A. and H. Kent Baker School of Education; and the Washington College of Law (WCL). American offers over 160 academic programs, including 71 bachelor's degrees, 87 master's degrees, and 10 doctoral degrees, as well as JD, LLM, and SJD programs. The university is classified as an "R1: Doctoral Universities – Very high research activity". With a student body of over 13,000 representing all 50 U.S. states and 141 countries, nearly a fifth of the students are international. Student athletes compete in intercollegiate athletic teams as the American Eagles in the NCAA Division I as a member of the Patriot League. AU is home to The Jack I. and Dorothy G. Bender Library, which holds more than one million books and is part of the Washington Research Library Consortium, along with WCL's Pence Law Library. American is one of the top three feeder schools to the U.S. Department of State.

== History ==
=== Founding ===
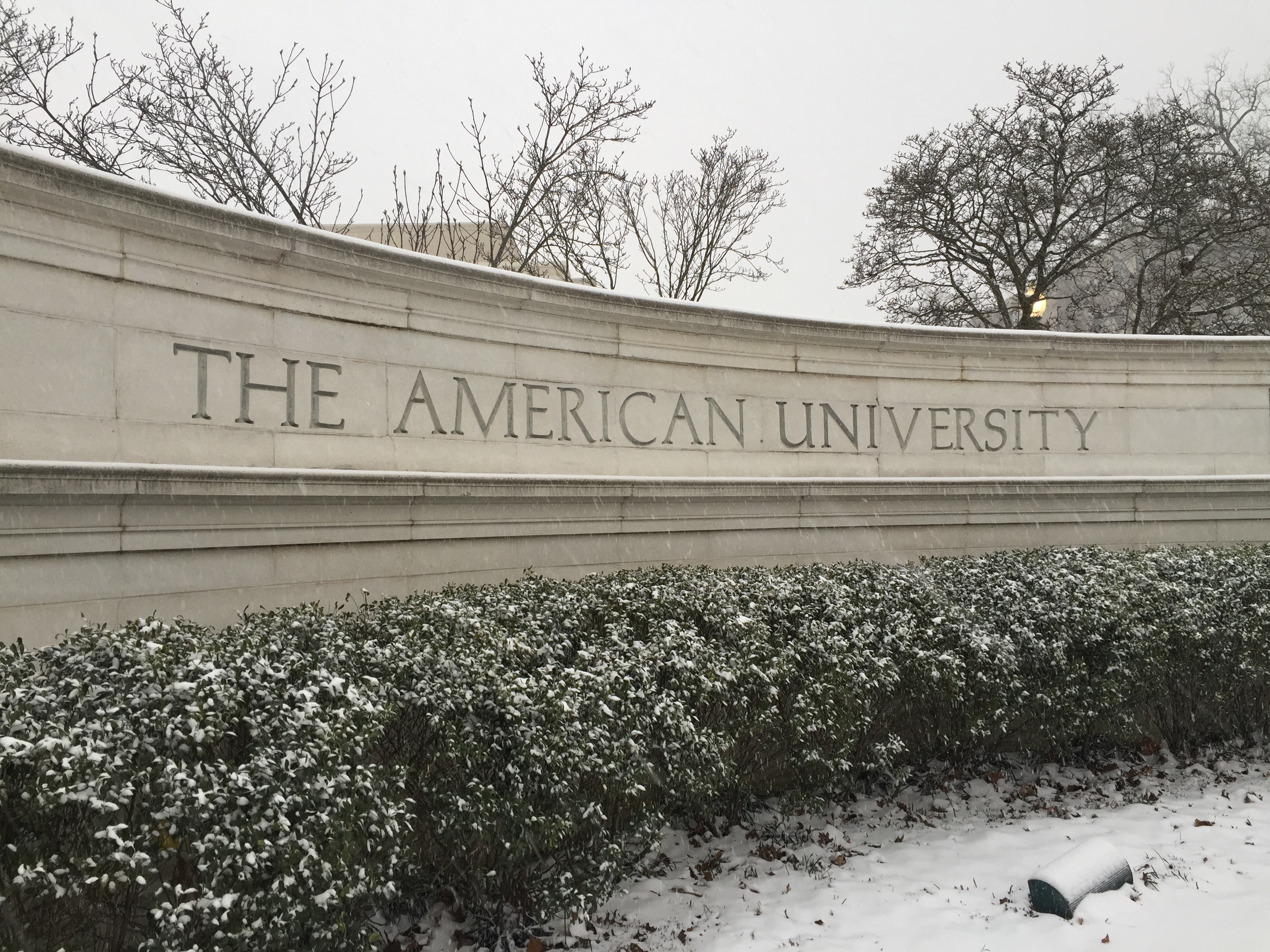
The front gate at American University

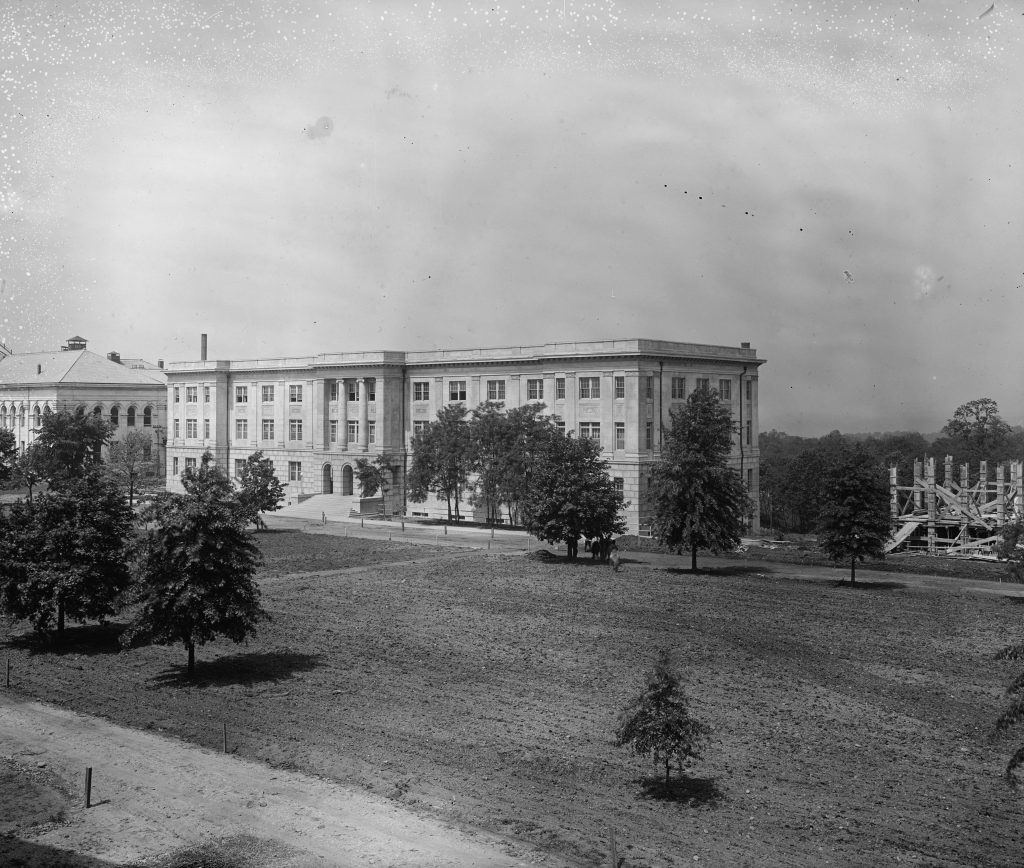
American University in 1916

American University was established in the District of Columbia by an Act of Congress on December 5, 1892, primarily due to the efforts of Methodist bishop John Fletcher Hurst, who aimed to create an institution that could train future public servants. Hurst also chose the university's site, which was in the rural periphery of Washington, D.C.

After more than three decades devoted principally to securing financial support, the university was officially dedicated on May 15, 1914. Instruction began in October 1914 with 28 student enrollees, 19 of whom were graduates and the remainder special students not candidates for a degree.

=== 20th century ===
American University's first commencement was held on June 2, 1915.

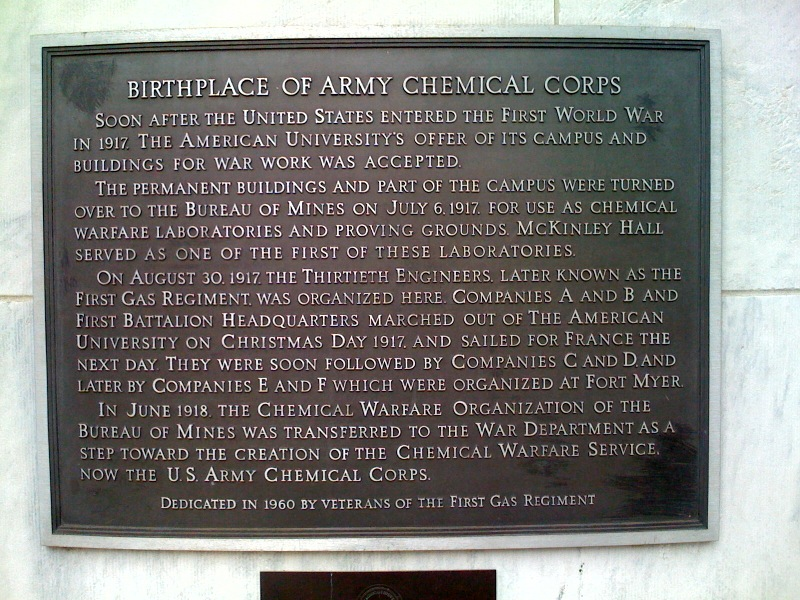
Birthplace of Army Chemical Corps

During World War I, the university allowed the U.S. military to use the university's grounds for testing. In 1917, the U.S. military divided American University into two segments: Camp Leach and Camp American University. Camp Leach was home to advanced research, development, and testing of modern camouflage techniques. Camp American University was an experiment station that became the birthplace of the United States' chemical weapons program and the site of chemical weapons testing. A major cleanup effort began in the 1990s to remove chemical weapon remnants, particularly a cache of over 200 mustard-gas shells buried beneath the campus. Additional material was located in June 2024.

Instruction was first offered at only the graduate level, in accordance with the vision of the university's founders. This changed in 1925 with the establishment of the College of Liberal Arts (subsequently named the College of Arts and Sciences), which offered undergraduate degrees and programs. What is now the School of Public Affairs was founded in 1934, partly to educate future federal employees in public administration.

AU's relationship with the U.S. government continued during World War II, when the campus hosted the U.S. Navy Bomb Disposal School and a WAVE barracks. For AU's role in these wartime efforts, the Victory ship SS American Victory was named in its honor.

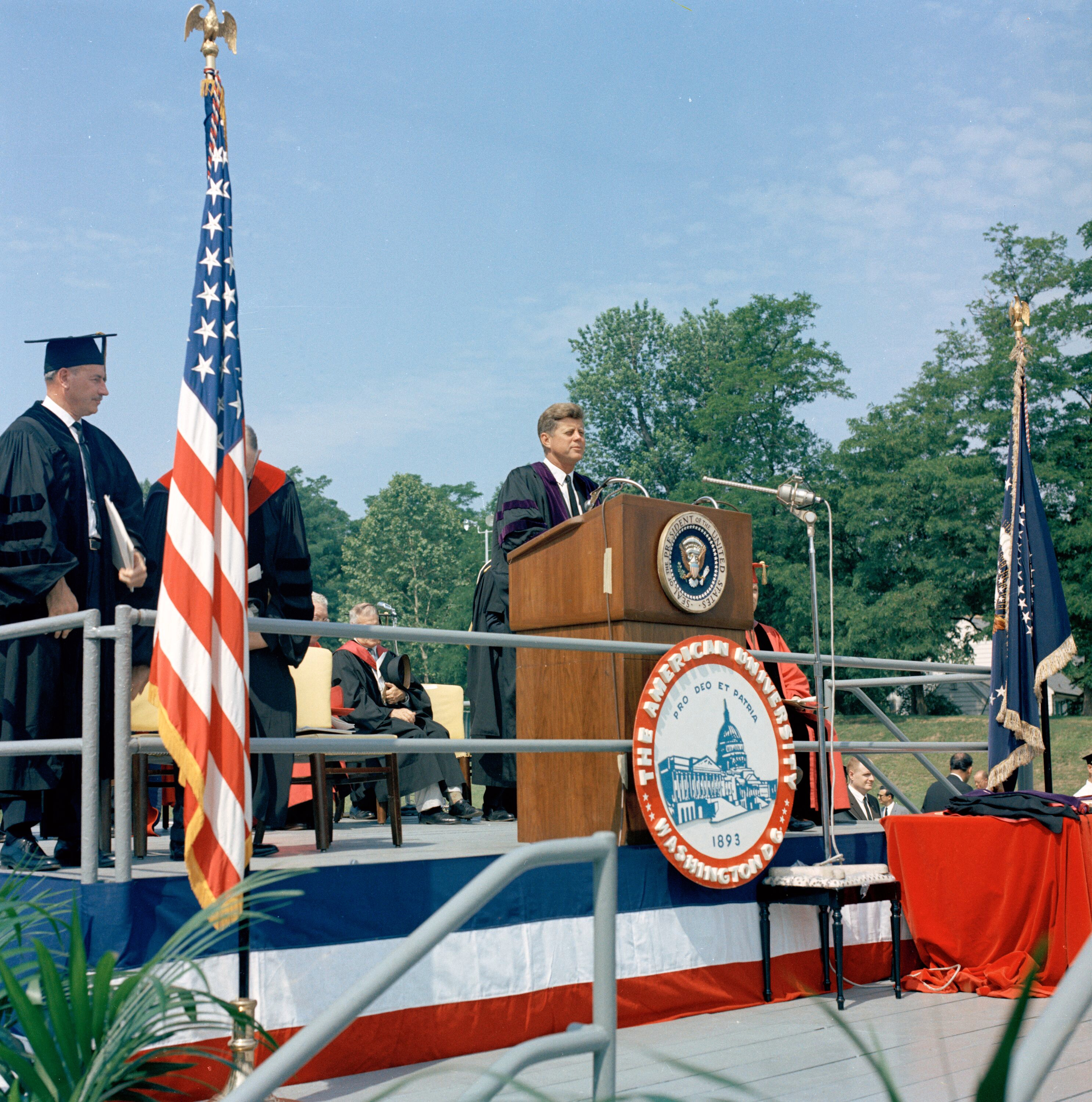
President John F. Kennedy delivers the commencement address at American University, on June 10, 1963

The post-World War II-period saw considerable growth and restructuring of AU. In 1949, the university merged with the Washington College of Law, which had been founded in 1896. Shortly after that, three departments were reorganized as schools: the School of Business Administration in 1955 (subsequently named the Robert P. and Arlene R. Kogod College of Business Administration and in 1999, renamed the Kogod School of Business); the School of Government and Public Administration in 1957; and the School of International Service in 1958.

In the early 1960s, the Department of Defense and the Central Intelligence Agency operated the federally funded research and development center (FFRDC) Special Operations Research Office as a think-tank at American University. AU's political involvement was furthered by President John F. Kennedy's Spring 1963 commencement address. In the speech, Kennedy called on the Soviet Union to work with the United States to achieve a nuclear-test-ban treaty and to reduce the considerable international tensions and the specter of nuclear war during that juncture of the Cold War.

From 1965 to 1977, the College of Continuing Education existed as a degree-granting college responsible for on- and off-campus adult-education programs. The Lucy Webb Hayes School of Nursing provided an undergraduate study in Nursing from 1965 until 1988. In 1972, the School of Government and Public Administration, the School of International Service, the Center for Technology and Administration, and the Center for the Administration of Justice (subsequently named the School of Justice) were incorporated into the College of Public and International Affairs.

The university bought the Immaculata Campus in 1986 to alleviate space problems. This would later become Tenley Campus.

In 1986, construction on the Adnan Khashoggi Sports and Convocation Center began. Financed with $5 million from and named for Saudi Arabian Trustee Adnan Khashoggi, the building was intended to update athletics facilities and provide a new arena, as well as a parking garage and office space for administrative services. Costing an estimated $19 million, the building represented the largest construction project to date but met protest by both faculty and students to the university's use of Khashoggi's name on the building due to his involvement in the international arms trade.

In 1988, the College of Public and International Affairs was reorganized to create two free-standing schools: the School of International Service and the School of Public Affairs, incorporating the School of Government and Public Administration and the School of Justice. That same year, construction of the Adnan Khashoggi Sports Center was completed while the Iran–Contra Affair controversy was at its height, although his name remained on the building until after Khashoggi defaulted on his donation obligation in the mid-to-late 1990s.

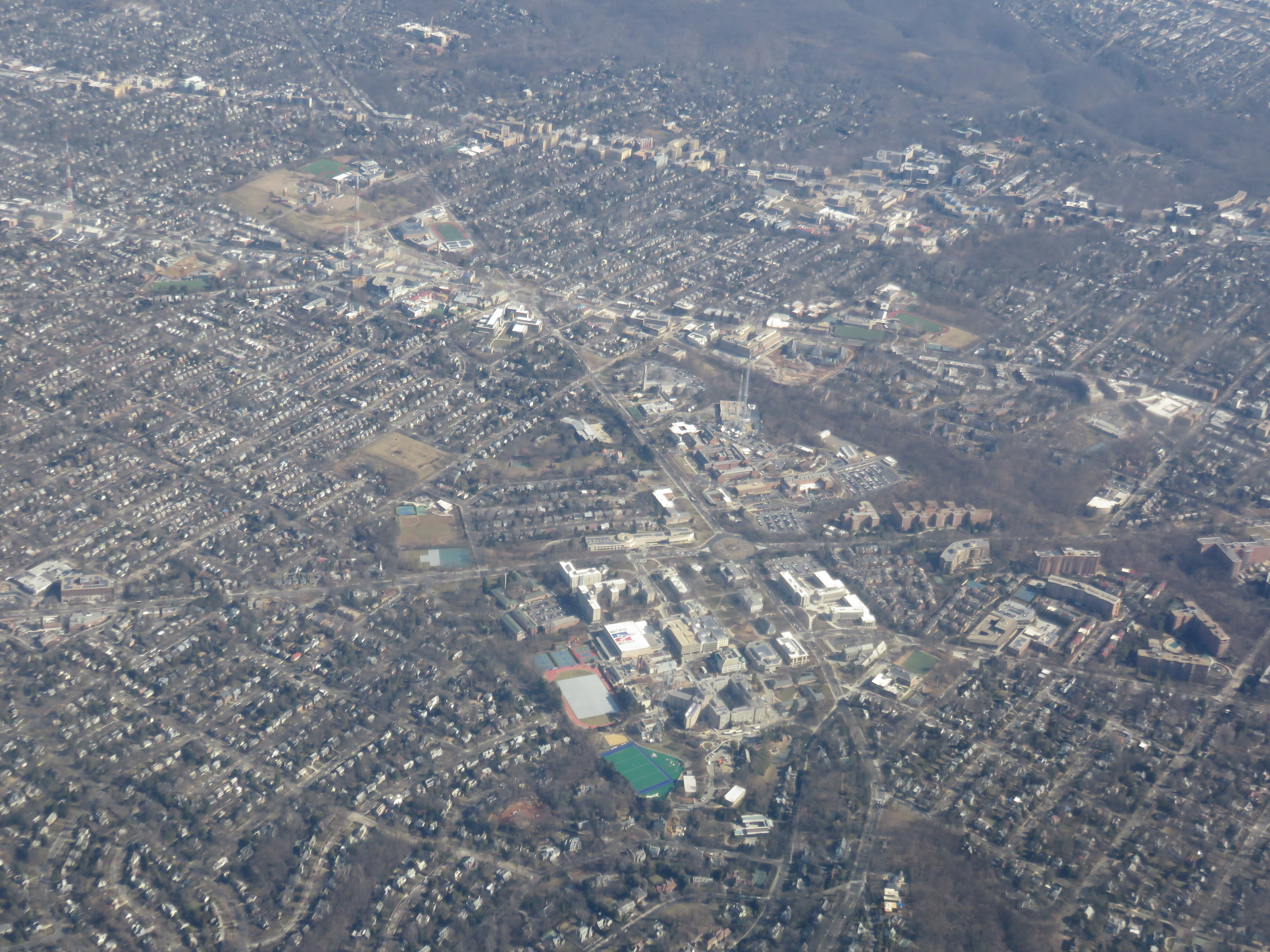
Aerial view of the American University campus, with Tenleytown in the background, in 2019

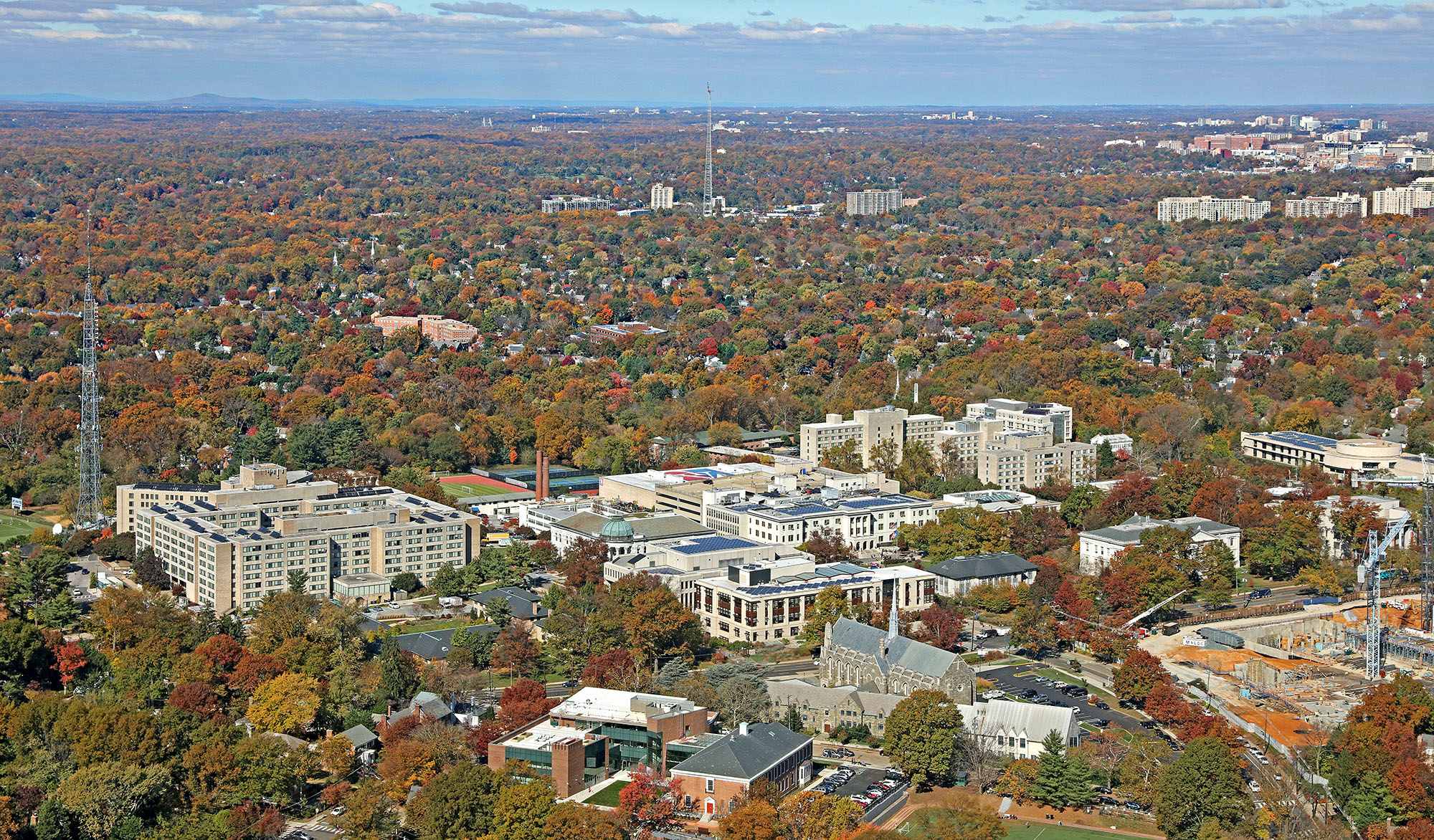
American University

In 1997, American University of Sharjah, the only coeducational, liberal arts university in the United Arab Emirates, signed a two-year contract with AU to provide academic management. This contract has since been extended multiple times through August 2009. A team of senior AU administrators relocated to Sharjah to assist in the establishment of the university and guide it through the Middle States Association of Colleges and Schools accreditation process.

=== 21st century ===
In fall 2005, the Katzen Arts Center and American University Museum opened, funded by a donation from Washington, D.C. philanthropists Dr. Cyrus and Myrtle Katzen. The center continues to exhibit the Katzen's art collection and focuses on interdisciplinary collaboration in the arts.

Benjamin Ladner was suspended from his position as president of the university on August 24, 2005, pending an investigation into possible misuse of university funds. University faculty passed votes of no confidence in President Ladner the following month. One month after the faculty vote, the board of trustees decided that Ladner would not return to American University as its president. According to The Chronicle of Higher Education, Ladner would receive total compensation of $4,270,665 in his final year of service, the second-highest of any university president in the nation.

Cornelius M. Kerwin, a long-time AU administrator, was then appointed interim president. On September 1, 2007, Kerwin was appointed to the position permanently after two applicants declined an offer from the board of trustees.

Ground was broken for the new School of International Service building on November 14, 2007, and completed in 2010. At the building's opening, a speech was given by then-Hawaiian Senator Daniel K. Inouye.

In 2015, American University began offering an accredited, accelerated online MBA program.

In May 2017, Kerwin retired as AU's president. In June, shortly after leaving her position as HHS secretary, Sylvia Mathews Burwell was tapped to become the 15th president and the first woman to serve in that role.

In 2017, Taylor Dumpson became AU's first Black female student body president. In her first full day in office, bananas were found at three places on campus, hanging from noose-like ropes, and marked with the initials "AKA," the initials of the Alpha Kappa Alpha sorority. The university considered the incident to be racist, with outgoing president Kerwin calling it a "cowardly, despicable act."

In 2019, the School of Education (SOE) was separated from the College of Arts and Sciences (CAS). According to then dean of SOE Cheryl Holcomb-McCoy the move was made to "encourage more students to pursue careers in education." Areas of study that students can pursue within the school include: teacher education, special education, education policy and leadership, and international education. The school is home to the Institute for Innovation in Education and the Center for Postsecondary Readiness and Success.

On April 22, 2020, AU announced that it had divested its endowment of fossil fuels, becoming one of the first universities in the United States to completely divest of both direct and indirect fossil fuel holdings. Following a student referendum in favor of divestment, the AU board of trustees voted against divesting the endowment in 2014. The decision to divest in 2020 came after extensive student campaigning from groups like Fossil Free AU and the undergraduate student government. In 2020, Fossil Free AU pushed for a second student referendum on the subject, and the student government released a report on divestment, presented to the board of trustees by student comptroller Robert Zitzmann.

In early August 2023, Burwell announced she would be stepping down as AU's 15th president but would continue work in AU's Sine Institute for Policy and Politics. On July 1, 2024, Jonathan Alger became AU's 16th president. Alger named Matthew Eynon, former Associate Vice President of the Massachusetts Institute of Technology (MIT), to lead AU's University Advancement and Strategic Planning.

In November 2024, it was reported that AU was considering restructuring its SOE, potentially merging it back into the CAS or even dissolving the SOE altogether, due to budget concerns. In February 2025, longtime finance professor H. Kent Baker made an undisclosed donation, the largest individual gift in AU's history, in honor of his late wife, Linda. The Board of Trustees recognized his transformative gift by renaming the school the Linda A. and H. Kent Baker School of Education, a move that ultimately preserved the school's independent status.

In May 2026, Alger announced his resignation as AU's 16th president. Beginning in July 2026, David Marchick serves AU as interim president until the next president is in place.

== Campuses ==
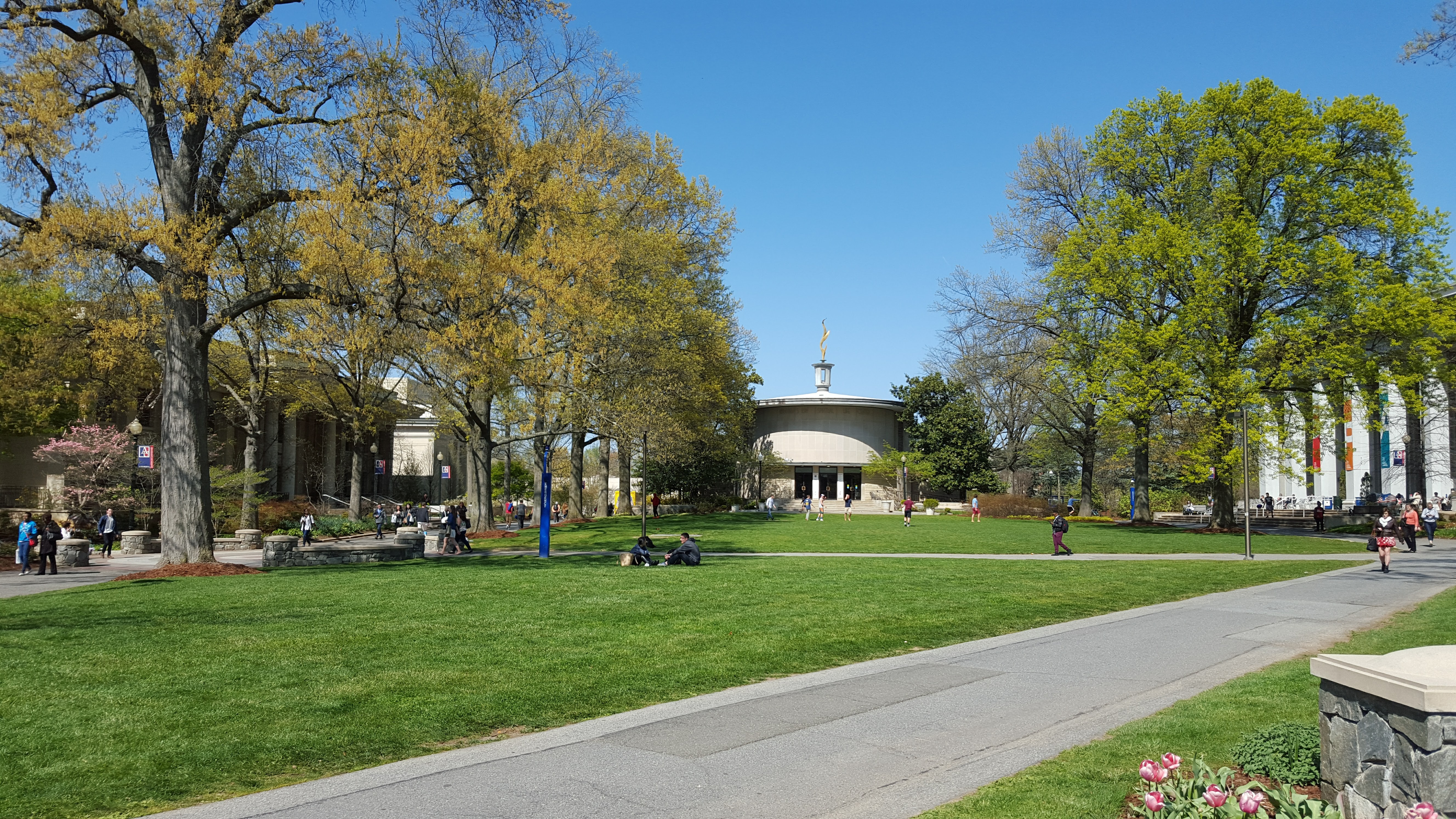
Eric Friedheim Quadrangle

American University has two contiguous campuses for academics and student housing: the main campus on Massachusetts Avenue and the East Campus on Nebraska Avenue. Washington College of Law was moved to the site of the Tenley Campus located in nearby Tenleytown. AU owns several other buildings in Tenleytown, Spring Valley, East Campus in Wesley Heights, and American University Park areas.

American University

The first design for the campus was done by Frederick Law Olmsted. However, it was significantly modified over time due to financial constraints. The campus occupies 84 acres (340,000 m^{2}) adjacent to Ward Circle, the intersection of Nebraska and Massachusetts Avenues. AU's campus is predominantly surrounded by the affluent residential neighborhoods characteristic of the Northwest quadrant of Washington, D.C. The campus includes a main quadrangle surrounded by academic buildings, nine residential halls, a 5,000-seat arena, and an outdoor amphitheater. The campus has been designated a public garden and arboretum by the American Public Gardens Association, which includes several exotic plantings dotting the landscape.

=== Tenley Campus ===
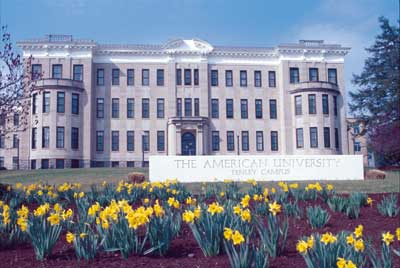
Capital Hall, Tenley Campus, American University

Tenley Campus, formerly the all-girls Immaculata Preparatory School, is located half a mile east of American's main campus. The university purchased the property in 1987 to serve as a satellite campus and to host the Washington Semester program.

Since 2016, Tenley Campus has housed the American University Washington College of Law (WCL). Over the years, several dormitory halls and academic buildings were renovated or replaced with modern facilities to accommodate the needs of a law school.

As of the Class of 2023, 75% of WCL graduates secured jobs requiring bar passage immediately after graduation. Additionally, 82% of graduates obtained employment that either required bar passage or considered a Juris Doctor degree an advantage. Only twenty students still sought employment post-graduation.

== Academics ==
The university is composed of eight divisions, referred to as colleges or schools, which house its academic programs. Except for WCL, undergraduate and graduate courses are housed within the same division, although organized into different programs. These colleges and schools are:

- College of Arts & Sciences (CAS)
- Kogod School of Business (KSB)
- School of Communication (SOC)
- Baker School of Education (SOE)
- School of International Service (SIS)
- School of Professional and Extended Studies
- School of Public Affairs (SPA)
- Washington College of Law (WCL)

=== Admissions and student demographics ===
Demographics of the Student Body at American University (2023) vs. U.S. College Students
	Undergraduate	U.S. (2018)
White	55.7%	55.2%
Asian	6.9%	7.0%
Hispanic	12.6%	19.5%
Black	7.8%	13.4%
Two or More Races	5.7%	3.9%
American Indian	0.03%	0.7%
Pacific Islander	0.05%	0.3%
International	8.1%	N/A
Unknown	3.1%	N/A
Male	36.7%	43%
Female	63.3%	57%

Undergraduate admissions statistics
- 2023 entering class
- Admit rate: 47% (▲ +6.8)
- Yield rate: 26.2% ( −0.2)

Test scores middle 50%^{[i]}
- SAT EBRW: 670–740
- SAT Math: 620–710
- ACT Composite: 29–32

Admission to American is considered to be "more selective" by the U.S. News & World Report. For the Class of 2027 (enrolling fall 2023), AU received 17,786 freshmen applications; 8,427 were admitted (47%) and 1,856 enrolled. The middle 50% range of SAT scores were 670–740 for Evidence-Based Reading and Writing and 620–710 for Math. The middle 50% range of the ACT Composite score was 29–32.

AU’s admission rate has fluctuated considerably over time. For fall 2016, AU admitted 25.7% of first-year applicants, the lowest admission rate in the university's history. As of 2026, this is still the lowest admission rate to date.

The university’s acceptance rate has increased in recent years due to enrollment challenges brought on by the COVID-19 pandemic, as well as increases in enrollment targets.

=== Study abroad ===
In 2026, U.S. News & World Report ranked American University 5th in study abroad programs. American University operates three premier programs in Brussels, Belgium; Madrid, Spain; and Nairobi, Kenya but, also partners with universities across the globe.

=== Rankings ===
Academic rankings

National
- Forbes: 142
- U.S. News & World Report: 88
- Washington Monthly: 103
- WSJ/College Pulse: 132

Global
- ARWU: 801-900
- QS: 646
- THE: 601–800
- U.S. News & World Report: 719

American University's undergraduate program was tied for 88th overall among "national universities" in U.S. News & World Report's 2026 rankings. The university is also ranked 5th in “Study Abroad”, tied for 15th in “Co-ops/Internships”, and 106th in "Best Value Schools".

In 2008, 2010, 2012, and 2018, American University was named the most politically active school in the nation by The Princeton Review's annual survey of college students. In 2006, the Fiske Guide to Colleges ranked AU as a "Best Buy" college for the quality of academic offerings in relation to the cost of attendance. However, in 2013, the Daily Beast listed the school in their list of "20 Least Affordable Colleges". For two years in a row, American University has had more students chosen to receive Presidential Management Fellowships than any other college or university in the country. In spring 2006, 34 graduate and law students were chosen for the honor. American University routinely ranks among the top mid-sized universities for producing Peace Corps volunteers.

The School of Public Affairs is ranked 12th in the U.S. by U.S. News & World Report for 2026.

== Folio literary magazine ==
Folio
- Discipline: Literary journal
- Language: English

Publication details
- History: 1984-present
- Publisher: American University (United States)
- Frequency: Annual

Standard abbreviations
- ISO 4: Folio

Indexing
- ISSN: 1547-4151
- OCLC no.: 20236678

Links
- Journal homepage

Folio is a literary magazine founded in 1984 and based at American University. It publishes fiction, poetry, visual art, and creative nonfiction twice each year. Folio has printed interviews with prominent writers, most recently Ann Beattie, Alice Fulton, Leslie Pietrzyk, Gregory Orr, and Adam Haslett. Work that has appeared in Folio was short-listed for the Pushcart Prize multiple times in the 1980s. Among the notable stories that first appeared in Folio are Jacob M. Appel's "Fata Morgana" and "Becoming Coretta Davis" by I. Bennett Capers.

== Sine Institute ==
On September 24, 2018, AU President Sylvia M. Burwell announced the Sine Institute of Policy and Politics. Taking advantage of AU's location in the nation's capital, the institute aims to bring together scholars, journalists, and experts from the public, private, and nonprofit sectors to find common ground and bipartisan policy solutions to the nation's problems. The Sine Institute launched with a conversation between Burwell and Republican Senator Bob Corker of Tennessee.

== Library system ==
American University Library
- Location: Washington, D.C.
- Established: 1926 as Battelle Library

Collection
- Size: over 1 million volumes

Access and use
- Population served: 10,000 students & 1,000 faculty

Other information
- Director: Jeehyun Davis
- Employees: 72 (full-time)
- Website: www.american.edu/library

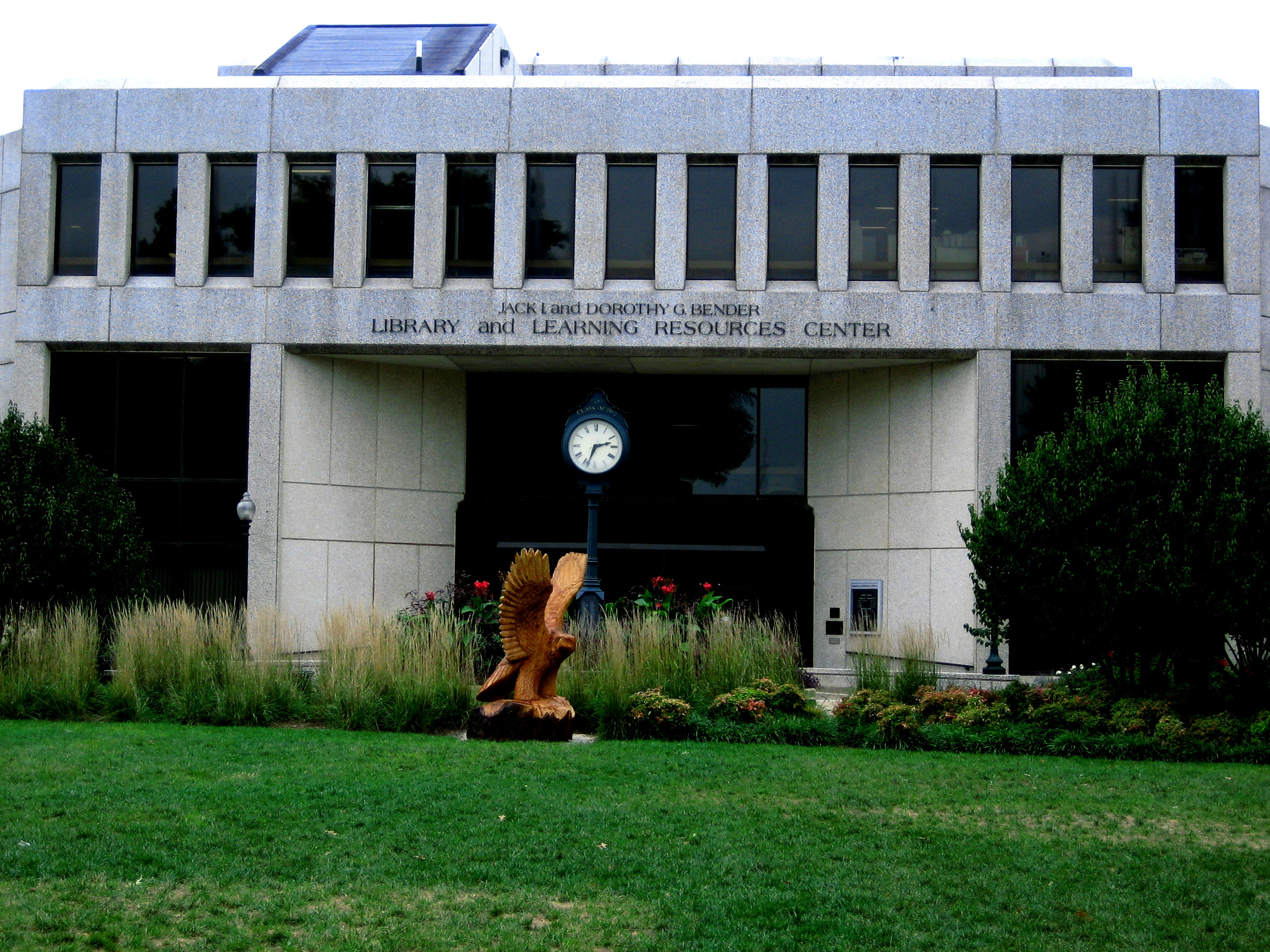
The Jack I. and Dorothy G. Bender Library and Learning Resources Center, which sits at the top of the Eric Friedheim Quadrangle

The Jack I. and Dorothy G. Bender Library and Learning Resources Center is the main library facility for the campus. The University Library is part of the Washington Research Library Consortium (WRLC), which includes seven other libraries. The WRLC operates a consortium loan service between member institutions and has a shared collections site in Upper Marlboro, Maryland.

The Library's Archives and Special Collections houses unique and rare materials and information on the institution's history. The University Archives is the repository for papers and other documents, including sound recordings and photographs, spanning more than a century of the university's history. Special Collections houses rare materials.

== Campus life ==
AU has over 150 recognized organizations on campus, ranging from political to social.

American has a Model United Nations team, ranked 1st in North America since the 2021–2022 academic year. The team competes actively at intercollegiate tournaments, and also hosts "AmeriMUNC" (American Model United Nations Conference) a yearly High School Model UN competition on campus.

American University Student Government (AUSG) is the governing body of the student population and has been ranked as the most active student government in the United States. It comprises the Undergraduate Senate and the Executive Branch. AUSG promotes advocacy and launches initiatives on campus supported by the student body.

AU has eight student-run university-recognized media organizations, including The Eagle newspaper, radio station WVAU, the Second District Records record label, the American Literary Magazine (AmLit), and several magazines. These media organizations are governed by a Student Media Board and are funded through the university's undergraduate student activity fee.

The university also owns National Public Radio's flagship capital affiliate, WAMU, which has been a source of nationally and internationally distributed programming such as The Diane Rehm Show and 1A.

=== Religious life ===
While AU is affiliated with the United Methodist Church and hosts the AU United Methodist Community, AU has a variety of other religious life groups, including Catholic, Chabad Lubavitch of the AU Community, American University Hillel, and the Jewish Student Association.

=== Greek life ===
American University has a Panhellenic Association (PHA), Interfraternity Council (IFC), and an Intercultural Greek Collective comprising organizations from the National Pan-Hellenic Council (NPHC), National Association of Latino Fraternal Organizations (NALFO), and National APIDA Panhellenic Association (NAPA). There are also several independent organizations.

=== Sustainability ===
An environmental science class at American conducted a study from February to April 2009 to measure the amount of food waste avoided by eliminating trays from one of the college's dining halls. The class found that trayless dinners resulted in 47.1% less solid waste than dinners during which trays were used, spurring a student-driven campaign to go trayless across campus.

In 2011, the Association for the Advancement of Sustainability in Higher Education (AASHE) awarded American University a gold rating, the highest possible, on their STARS scale for sustainability. Since then, American University has earned five consecutive gold ratings, the most recent in 2020.

Also in 2011, American University's School of International Service building earned Leadership in Energy and Environmental Design (LEED) Gold certification for its 70,000 square foot building renowned for sustainable design and "cradle-to-cradle" philosophy.

In 2014, American University ranked #2 in the Sierra Club's list of the 'Top 10 Greenest Colleges'.

In 2014, the university announced an ambitious project to build a solar farm in partnership with George Washington University. As of January 2016, the completed solar farm provides an equivalent of 50% of the university's electricity.

In 2018, American University became the first university in the United States to achieve carbon-neutral status. In 2020, AU announced that it had eliminated all public fossil fuel investments from its endowment.

== Athletics ==
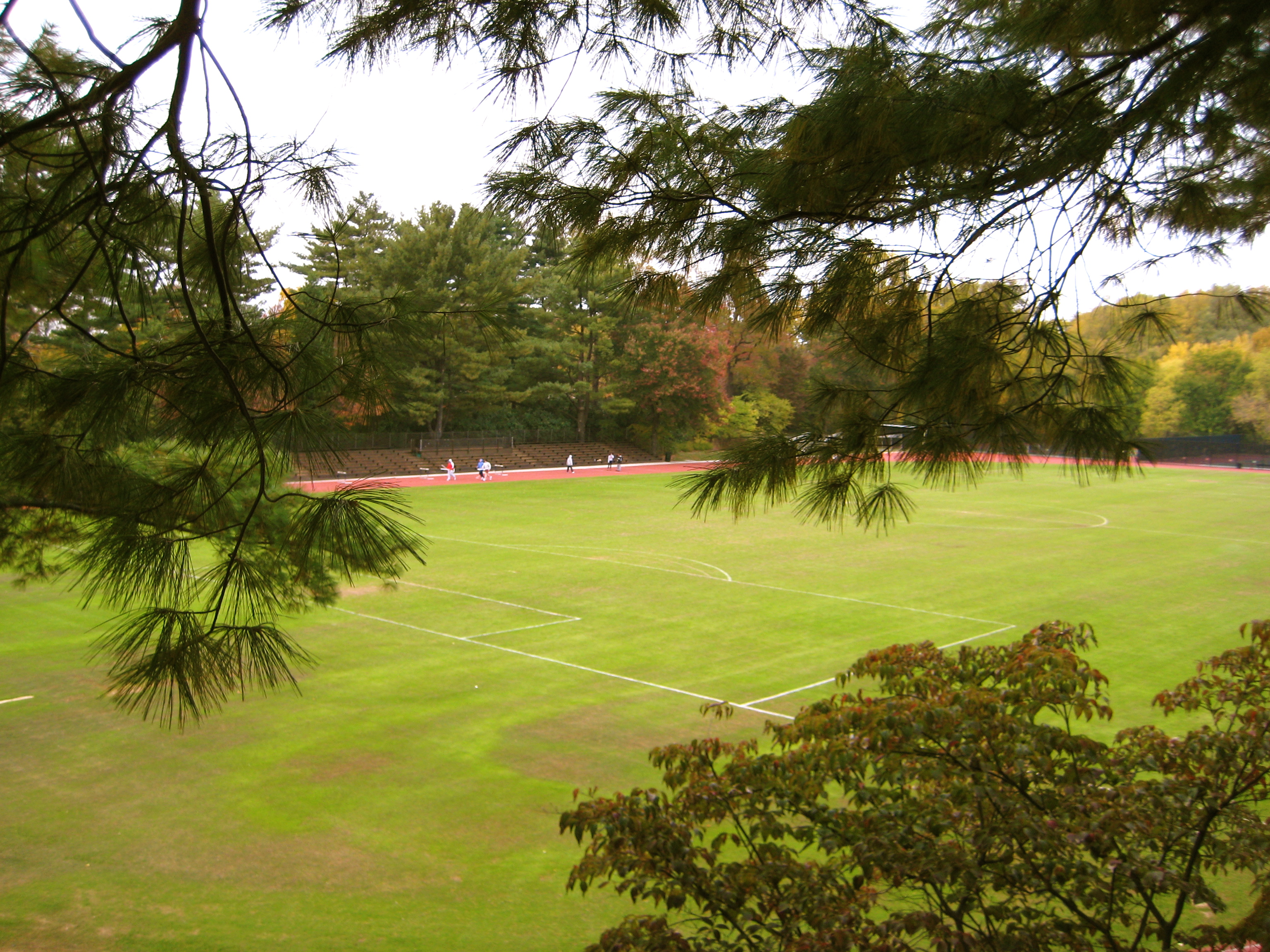
Reeves Field

A member of the Patriot League, AU has several sports teams including men's and women's basketball, soccer, cross-country, swimming and diving, track, women's volleyball, field hockey, and lacrosse, and men's wrestling. Club sports, such as tennis, rugby, rowing, ice hockey, field hockey, equestrian and ultimate frisbee also have teams.

Bender Arena, a multi-purpose facility, hosts many of American's athletic competitions. Bender Arena opened on January 23, 1988, when AU's women's basketball team hosted James Madison University.

Reeves Field, home to AU's soccer team, earned the 2002 College Soccer Field of the Year by the Sports Turf Managers Association, hosted its fifth NCAA Tournament game, and served as the training site for the Uruguay national football team. Reeves Field features a six-lane track to accommodate the track and field programs at AU and functions as a multi-purpose event site.

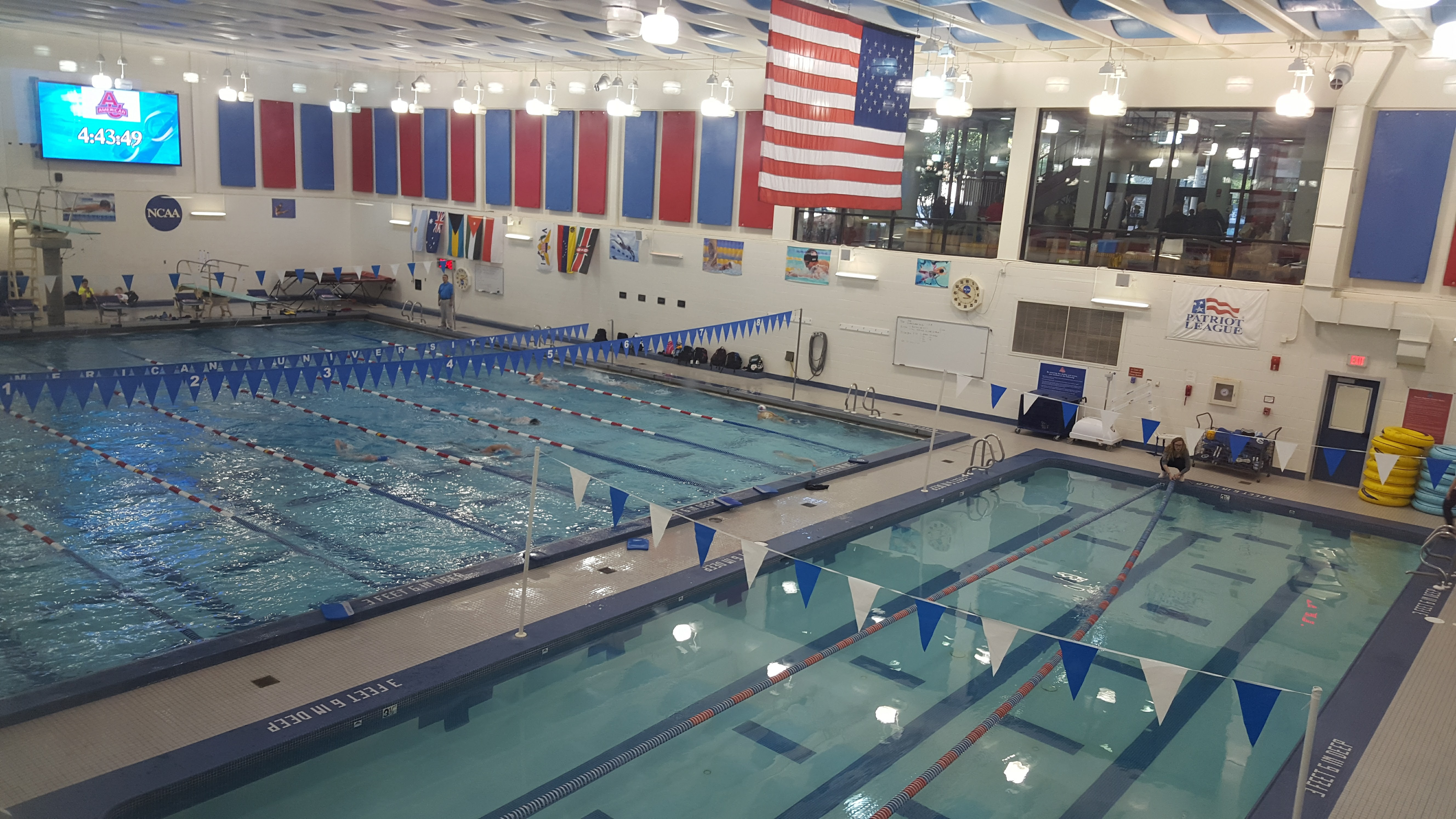
The swimming pool located in the Reeves Aquatic Center

American University has seven tennis courts and two basketball courts in the outdoor recreational facility located next to Reeves Field and behind Bender Arena. AU has hosted Patriot League tennis team championships three times since joining the league. Both the men's and women's tennis teams have been cut from the athletics program.

On March 14, 2008, AU earned its first NCAA tournament berth in men's basketball by defeating Colgate University in the Patriot League Championship Game. However, AU lost its first-round NCAA tournament game against the University of Tennessee. On March 13, 2009, AU's men's basketball team repeated as Patriot League Champion by defeating Holy Cross 73–57, earning an automatic bid to the NCAA Men's Division I Basketball Championship. They ultimately lost to Villanova University in the first round on March 19, 2009, with a final score of 80–67.

== Notable people ==
Notable university alumni, faculty, and affiliates include eight foreign heads of state; over 30 U.S. senators and representatives; two governors; a lieutenant governor; multiple U.S. Cabinet members; two Nobel laureates; two Pulitzer Prize winners; an Academy Award recipient; many Fulbright Scholars; more than 30 ambassadors; and prominent global finance leaders.
