= List of Delta Gamma members =

Following is a list of members of Delta Gamma collegiate women's fraternity.

== Business ==
Name	Chapter	Notability	Ref.
Melissa Doi	Sigma	senior manager at IQ Financial Systems who was killed during the September 11 attacks on the World Trade Center	
Merry Hull	Alpha Rho	redesigned the basic construction of the glove in 1939, creating the modern industry standard	
Lisa Ingram	Alpha Upsilon	president and CEO of White Castle	
Jessica O. Matthews	Zeta Phi	inventor, CEO and venture capitalist	
Sharen Jester Turney	Alpha Iota	president and CEO of Victoria's Secret	

== Education ==
Name	Chapter	Notability	Ref.
Edith Abbott	Kappa	economist, statistician, social worker, dean of the University of Chicago, first female dean in the U.S.	
Judy L. Bonner	Beta Psi	first woman president of the University of Alabama	
Martha Burger	Mu	president of Oklahoma City University	
Alette Coble-Temple	Zeta Epsilon	professor of clinical psychology at John F. Kennedy University, Ms. Wheelchair America 2016	
Ada Comstock	Lambda	first full-time president of Radcliffe College, first dean of women at the University of Minnesota	
Margaret Conditt	Beta Psi	Ohio House of Representatives	
Gratia Countryman	Lambda	librarian who led the Minneapolis Public Library	
Marion Durbin Ellis	Theta	ichthyologist and entomologist	
Carlotta Maury	Chi	professor of geology and zoology at Huguenot College, University of the Cape of Good Hope, petroleum geologist at Royal Dutch Shell	
Michele L. Stites	Beta Sigma	associate professor, researcher, and author at UMBC	
Clyda Stokes Rent	Gamma Mu	president of Mississippi University for Women	
Kristen E. Murray	Beta Epsilon	interim Dean at Temple Law School	

== Entertainment ==
Name	Chapter	Notability	Ref.
Diem Brown	Gamma Mu	cast member of MTV's The Challenge, entertainment reporter	
Sabrina Bryan	Zeta Iota	co-star of Disney Channel's original film series and musical group The Cheetah Girls, contestant on Dancing with the Stars	
Nadine Jolie Courtney	Zeta Theta	cast member of Bravo television show Newlyweds: The First Year, novelist, writer	
Cheryl Crawford	Eta	Broadway producer; founder of Group Theatre and Actors Studio	
Channing Dungey	Alpha Sigma	television executive, chairwoman and CEO of Warner Bros. Television Studios	
Judith Ford	Iota	Miss America 1969	
Mary Frann	Sigma	actress in Newhart	
Jeannette Clift George	Beta Eta	film and stage actress	
Michele Greene	Alpha Nu	television actress, singer, and author	
Alex Guarnaschelli	Zeta Theta	chef, cookbook author, and television personality	
Samantha Harris	Sigma	former host of Dancing with the Stars, host of various shows on E!, model, and actress	
Patricia Heaton	Epsilon	Emmy Award-Winning actress and comedian	
Dagny Hultgreen	Beta Eta	film actress and entertainment reporter	
Christine Lahti	Xi	Academy Award, Golden Globe, and Emmy Award-Winning actress and director	
Julia Louis-Dreyfus	Sigma	Emmy Award-winning actress	
Joan Lunden	Delta Eta	former host of Good Morning America	
Heather McMahan	Alpha Psi	actress, comedian	
Kari Michaelsen	Alpha Sigma	actress, television personality, and motivational speaker	
Donna Mills	Iota	actress in Knots Landing	
Cierra Ortega	Alpha Pi	contestant on Love Island (American TV series) season 7.	
Cristina Perez	Alpha Sigma	lawyer, television judge, radio host, and author	
Kelly Preston	Alpha Nu	film actress	
Alice Ripley	Gamma Epsilon	Broadway actress; Tony Award winner, Next to Normal	
Eva Marie Saint	Beta Mu	actress	
Evelyn Ay Sempier	Beta Phi	Miss America 1954	
Susan Spencer	Beta Xi	actress and comedian from Saturday Night Live	
Lizz Winstead	Lambda	creator of The Daily Show	

== News ==
Name	Chapter	Notability	Ref.
Mona Kosar Abdi	Epsilon Iota	journalist with WSET ABC 13, Al Jazeera Media Network, and KGTV Channel 10	
Jill Arrington	Beta Tau	former sports reporter for CBS	
Ann Coulter	Chi	media pundit, syndicated columnist, author	
E.D. Tarbox Hill	Beta Eta	news anchor former host of Fox and Friends	
Betsy Martin	Beta Epsilon	Emmy-winning journalist and former news executive at NBC's Meet the Press	
Terry Murphy	Epsilon	Emmy Award-winning journalist of Hard Copy	
Kyra Phillips	Alpha Nu	CNN anchor, four-time Emmy Award winner	
Susan Spencer	Beta Xi	news reporter and correspondent for 48 Hours Mystery and CBS Sunday Morning	
Anita Vogel	Alpha Nu	Fox News correspondent, Emmy Award winner	
Jan Yanehiro	Gamma Lambda	Emmy award-winning broadcast journalist	

== Government and public service ==
Name	Chapter	Notability	Ref.
Grace Abbott	Kappa	U.S. Secretary of Labor; head of the United States Children's Bureau, first U.S. representative to the League of Nations	
Carol Bellamy	Beta Lambda	president and CEO of World Learning, executive director of UNICEF (1995–2005), former director of the U.S. Peace Corps	
Rita Colwell	Beta Iota	first female Director of the National Science Foundation and chairman of Canon US Life Sciences, Inc.	
Nancy-Ann DeParle	Gamma Alpha	deputy chief of staff for policy in the Obama administration, director of the White House Office of Health Reform	
Susan Engeleiter	Omega	first woman to head the Small Business Administration	
Mary E. Gladwin	Eta	Red Cross nurse who served in three wars, recipient of the Florence Nightingale Medal	
Fern Holland	Alpha Iota	attorney, worked for United States Agency for International Development, Defense of Freedom Medal recipient	
Tracy Walder	Alpha Nu	FBI agent and CIA employee, author of The Unexpected Spy	

== Law ==
Name	Chapter	Notability	Ref.
Elizabeth M. Boyer	Beta Mu	author, lawyer, and founder of Women's Equity Action League	
Deborah L. Cook	Eta	federal judge for the U.S. Court of Appeals for the Sixth Circuit	
Sarah T. Hughes	Psi Second	first female federal judge	
Cristina Perez	Alpha Sigma	lawyer, television judge, radio host, and author	

== Politicians ==
Name	Chapter	Notability	Ref.
Kelly Ayotte	Alpha Chi	United States Senator from New Hampshire, New Hampshire Attorney General	
Jo Ann Emerson	Alpha Rho	U.S. Congresswoman from Missouri	
Dorothy Felton	Alpha Omega	Georgia General Assembly	
Melissa Hart	Epsilon Delta	U.S. Congresswoman from Pennsylvania	
Mary Landrieu	Gamma Zeta	Senator from Louisiana, Louisiana State Treasurer, and Louisiana House of Representatives	
Ruth Bryan Owen	Kappa	United States Ambassador to Denmark, United States House of Representatives from Florida	
Joan A. Polaschik	Epsilon Gamma	United States Ambassador to Algeria, director of the Foreign Service Institute	
Susie Lee	Beta Nu	United States House of Representatives from Nevada	

== Sports ==
Name	Chapter	Notability	Ref.
Judy Bell	Alpha Pi	first female president of United States Golf Association	
Carin Cone	Gamma Sigma	competition swimmer, Olympic medalist	
Polina Edmunds	Zeta Epsilon	figure skater, 2014 Winter Olympics	
Emilee Klein	Gamma Phi	professional golfer and college golf coach	
Bonnie Lauer	Beta Xi	professional golfer; 1977 Rookie of the Year	
Alison Lee	Alpha Sigma	professional golfer	
Alison Levine	Alpha Phi	mountain climber, author, speaker	
Cynthia "Cynt" Marshall	Gamma	Dallas Mavericks CEO	
Susan Nattrass	Beta Beta	trap shooter in the 1976 Summer Olympics, World Champion	
Jill Savery	Gamma	gold medal at the 1996 Summer Olympics in Atlanta with the synchronized swim team	
Anne White	Alpha Nu	former professional tennis player	

== Writers and publishing ==
Name	Chapter	Notability	Ref.
George Banta	Phi	founder of George Banta Company, publisher of multiple fraternity and sorority magazines	
Jordana Blake	Epsilon Psi	romance author	
Christine Clifford	Beta Chi	author and motivational speaker	
Brenda Wang Clough	Beta Nu	science fiction and fantasy author	
Heloise Cruse	Zeta Eta	advice columnist	
Carolyn Englefield	Epsilon	author, editor for House Beautiful, House & Garden, and Veranda	
Ellen Bromfield Geld	Chi	author, conservationist, writer for the newspaper O Estado de São Paulo	
Jackie Martin	Rho	first female photo and art editor of the Washington Herald, war correspondent, and director of photo operations of The Marshall Plan	
Marcia McNutt	Beta Delta	editor-in-chief of the peer-reviewed journal Science, geophysicist	
Lauren Purcell	Upsilon	deputy editor of Self magazine, editor-in-chief of Every Day With Rachael Ray	
Terry Tempest Williams	Beta Gamma	author, conservationist, activist	

== See also ==
- List of Delta Gamma chapters
