= List of Delta Gamma chapters =

Delta Gamma is a North American women's fraternity. It was established at the Lewis School in Oxford, Mississippi in 1873 and has since chartered chapters in the United States and Canada. The fraternity uses (I), (II), or (III) as clarification adjectives for chapter names that are reassigned.

== Collegiate chapters ==
In the following Delta Gamma collegiate chapter list, active chapters are indicated in bold and inactive chapters and institutions are in italics.

Chapter	Charter date and range	Institution	Location	State or province	Status	Ref.
Psi I	December 25, 1873 – 1889	Lewis School	Oxford, Mississippi	MS	Inactive, Reassigned	
Chi I	May 2, 1878 – 1880	Water Valley Seminary	Water Valley, Mississippi	MS	Inactive, Reassigned	
Theta I	May 27, 1878 – 1880	Fairmount College	Monteagle, Tennessee	TN	Inactive, Reassigned	(Note: This school closed in 1918. The building that formerly housed Fairmount College is now the DuBose Conference Center.)
Upsilon I	October 1, 1878 – 1881	Bolivar College	Bolivar, Tennessee	TN	Inactive, Reassigned	
Phi I	December 11, 1878 – 1883; 1995–2008	Franklin College	Franklin, Indiana	IN	Inactive, Reassigned	
**Eta**	March 15, 1879	University of Akron	Akron, Ohio	OH	Active	(Note: Chapter was formed at Buchtel College, now the University of Akron.)
Delta I	January 1, 1880 – 1881	Trinity College	Tehuacana, Texas	TX	Inactive, Reassigned	(Note: The Trinity campus has been moved several times, from Tehuacana, to Waxahachie, then to its current location in San Antonio.)
Delta II	September 17, 1881 – 1887	Hanover College	Hanover, Indiana	IN	Inactive	
**Omega**	October 9, 1881	University of Wisconsin–Madison	Madison, Wisconsin	WI	Active	
Pi I	January 1, 1882 – 1885	Synodical College	Fulton, Missouri	MO	Inactive	(Note: An alternative name for this school is the Fulton Female Synodical College, as "Female Synodical College" was used on the chapter's charter.)
**Sigma**	March 1, 1882	Northwestern University	Evanston, Illinois	IL	Active	
Alpha	June 17, 1882 – 1908	University of Mount Union	Alliance, Ohio	OH	Inactive	
**Lambda**	October 22, 1882	University of Minnesota	Minneapolis, Minnesota	MN	Active	(Note: Lambda chapter was active from at least June 1882 and sent a delegate to the May 1883 convention. Its installation date, noted in various yearbooks, was October 22, 1882; however, by some oversight, Lambda did not receive its signed paper charter until December 1883, some eighteen months after its founding.)
**Zeta**	March 9, 1883 – 1987; December 13, 1992	Albion College	Albion, Michigan	MI	Active	(Note: Original Charter stolen. Was replaced 10 years later, replaced without an exact date)
Theta II (see **Theta Beta**)	December 17, 1883 – 1888	Adelbert College	Cleveland, Ohio	OH	Inactive	(Note: Re-established in 2004 as Theta Beta chapter when the college's name was Case Western Reserve University)
Upsilon II (see Gamma Omega)	September 23, 1884 – 1887	St. Lawrence University	Canton, New York	NY	Inactive	(Note: Re-established on the campus with a new name as the Gamma Omega chapter in 1960.)
**Chi II**	March 7, 1885	Cornell University	Ithaca, New York	NY	Active	
**Phi**	June 12, 1885	University of Colorado Boulder	Boulder, Colorado	CO	Active	
**Xi**	December 4, 1885	University of Michigan	Ann Arbor, Michigan	MI	Active	
**Tau**	November 9, 1886	University of Iowa	Iowa City, Iowa	IA	Active	
Delta III (see **Alpha Nu**)	1887–1897	University of Southern California	Los Angeles, California	CA	Inactive	(Note: Re-established in 1922 as the Alpha Nu chapter.)
**Kappa**	October 19, 1888	University of Nebraska–Lincoln	LincolnLincoln, Nebraska	NE	Active	
Psi II	May 22, 1891 – 1950	Goucher College	Baltimore, Maryland	MD	Inactive	(Note: The chapter was formed at the Women's College of Baltimore, which is now Goucher College. While the chapter was active, Goucher College was located in Baltimore, Maryland. The college moved to nearby Towson in 1953.)
Upsilon III	March 6, 1897 – 1944; 1979–1999	Stanford University	Stanford, California	CA	Inactive	(Note: Formed in 1897 by absorbing the local Ann Jane Club, established in 1894. Re-established as a colony in 1978. This chapter name has been reused several times, between Bolivar College, St. Lawrence University, and Stanford.)
**Theta II**	December 10, 1898	Indiana University Bloomington	Bloomington, Indiana	IN	Active	(Note: Formed from Alpha Zeta Beta (local), established in 1892.)
**Rho**	May 23, 1901	Syracuse University	Syracuse, New York	NY	Active	
**Beta**	June 5, 1903	University of Washington	Seattle, Washington	WA	Active	(Note: Formed in 1903 from Delta Alpha (local), established in 1900.)
**Iota**	May 12, 1906	University of Illinois Urbana-Champaign	Urbana, Illinois	IL	Active	(Note: Formed in 1906 from Zeta Nu (local), established in 1905.)
**Gamma**	April 12, 1907	University of California, Berkeley	Berkeley, California	CA	Active	(Note: Formed in 1907 from Pie Delta Monte (local), established in 1900.)
**Omicron**	May 7, 1908	Adelphi University	Garden City, New York	NY	Active	(Note: Formed in 1908 from Phi Delta Phi (local), established in 1903.)
**Mu**	April 15, 1909	University of Missouri	Columbia, Missouri	MO	Active	
**Epsilon**	March 17, 1911	Ohio State University	Columbus, Ohio	OH	Active	
**Pi II**	September 7, 1911 – 19xx ?; 2019	University of Montana	Missoula, Montana	MT	Active	(Note: Formed in 1911 from Sigma Tau Gamma (local), established in 1908. Re-established in 2019 as a colony.)
**Nu**	September 16, 1911	University of Idaho	Moscow, Idaho	ID	Active	(Note: Formed in 1911 from Beta Sigma (local), established in 1900.)
Alpha Beta	May 17, 1912 – 1934	Swarthmore College	Swarthmore, Pennsylvania	PA	Inactive	(Note: Formed in 1912 from Pi Sigma (local), established in 1906.)
Alpha Gamma	June 26, 1913 – 1978	University of Toronto	Toronto, Ontario, Canada	ON	Inactive	(Note: Formed in 1913 from Sigma Beta Pi (local), established in 1907.)
**Alpha Delta**	October 17, 1913	University of Oregon	Eugene, Oregon	OR	Active	(Note: Formed in 1913 from Upsilon Chi Zeta (local), established in 1909.)
Alpha Epsilon	April 27, 1914 – 1973; 1990–2022	Washington University in St. Louis	St. Louis, Missouri	MO	Inactive	
**Alpha Zeta**	September 11, 1915	Lawrence University	Appleton, Wisconsin	WI	Active	
**Alpha Eta**	September 30, 1916	Whitman College	Walla Walla, Washington	WA	Active	
**Alpha Theta**	December 16, 1916	University of North Dakota	Grand Forks, North Dakota	ND	Active	
**Alpha Iota**	June 4, 1918	University of Oklahoma	Norman, Oklahoma	OK	Active	
**Alpha Kappa**	June 9, 1920	Washburn University	Topeka, Kansas	KS	Active	
**Alpha Lambda**	April 30, 1921	Drake University	Des Moines, Iowa	IA	Active	
Alpha Mu	February 11, 1922 – 1963	Beloit College	Beloit, Wisconsin	WI	Inactive	
**Alpha Nu** (see Delta III	February 11, 1922	University of Southern California	Los Angeles, California	CA	Active	(Note: Delta chapter was restored in 1922 by absorption of Beta Phi (local), established in 1902.)
**Alpha Xi**	February 18, 1922	West Virginia University	Morgantown, West Virginia	WV	Active	
**Alpha Omicron**	February 2, 1923	Miami University	Oxford, Ohio	OH	Active	
**Alpha Pi**	October 7, 1923	University of Arizona	Tucson, Arizona	AZ	Active	
**Alpha Sigma**	March 21, 1924	University of California, Los Angeles	Los Angeles, California	CA	Active	
**Alpha Rho**	May 10, 1924	Ohio Wesleyan University	Delaware, Ohio	OH	Active	
**Alpha Tau**	October 3, 1925	Butler University	Indianapolis, Indiana	IN	Active	
**Alpha Upsilon**	October 16, 1926	Southern Methodist University	Dallas, Texas	TX	Active	
**Alpha Psi**	May 21, 1927 – 1928; May 1938	University of Mississippi	Oxford, Mississippi	MS	Active	
**Alpha Phi**	June 14, 1928	University of British Columbia	Vancouver, British Columbia, Canada	BC	Active	
**Alpha Chi**	May 17, 1930	Pennsylvania State University	University Park, Pennsylvania	PA	Active	
**Alpha Omega**	October 11, 1930 – 1992; 2017	University of Arkansas	Fayetteville, Arkansas	AR	Active	
Beta Alpha	February 21, 1931 – 1973	McGill University	Montreal, Quebec, Canada	QC	Inactive	
**Beta Beta**	May 9, 1931	University of Alberta	Edmonton, Alberta, Canada	AB	Active	
**Beta Gamma**	May 7, 1932	University of Utah	Salt Lake City, Utah	UT	Active	
Beta Delta	March 29, 1932 – July 25, 2023	Colorado College	Colorado Springs, Colorado	CO	Inactive	
**Beta Epsilon**	March 21, 1936	American University	Washington, D.C.	DC	Active	
**Beta Zeta**	May 13, 1938	Denison University	Granville, Ohio	OH	Active	
**Beta Eta**	April 21, 1939	University of Texas at Austin	Austin, Texas	TX	Active	
**Beta Theta**	June 1, 1939 – 1974; October 11, 1986	Duke University	Durham, North Carolina	NC	Active	
**Beta Lambda**	October 7, 1939	Gettysburg College	Gettysburg, Pennsylvania	PA	Active	
**Beta Iota**	February 17, 1940	Purdue University	West Lafayette, Indiana	IN	Active	
**Beta Kappa**	April 26, 1941	University of Kansas	Lawrence, Kansas	KS	Active	
**Beta Mu**	November 6, 1943	Bowling Green State University	Bowling Green, Ohio	OH	Active	
**Beta Nu**	January 29, 1944	Carnegie Mellon University	Pittsburgh, Pennsylvania	PA	Active	
Beta Rho	October 6, 1945 – 1982; 1990–2015	George Washington University	Washington, D.C.	DC	Inactive	
**Beta Sigma**	October 13, 1945	University of Maryland, College Park	College Park, Maryland	MD	Active	
Beta Pi	November 10, 1945 – 2018	Willamette University	Salem, Oregon	OR	Inactive	
**Beta Xi**	January 5, 1946	Michigan State University	East Lansing, Michigan	MI	Active	
**Beta Tau**	February 16, 1946 – February 27, 2018; March 23, 2025	University of Miami	Coral Gables, Florida	FL	Active	(Note: The national fraternity suspended the chapter in 2018 for at least two years for violating the university's hazing and alcohol policies.)
Beta Phi	April 7, 1946 – 1958	University of Pennsylvania	Philadelphia, Pennsylvania	PA	Inactive	
**Beta Upsilon**	April 27, 1946	Oregon State University	Corvallis, Oregon	OR	Active	
**Beta Chi**	September 28, 1946	University of Denver	Denver, Colorado	CO	Active	
**Beta Omega**	November 6, 1946	Washington State University	Pullman, Washington	WA	Active	
**Beta Psi**	February 8, 1947 – 1979; 2011	University of Alabama	Tuscaloosa, Alabama	AL	Active	
**Gamma Beta**	March 27, 1947	University of Tulsa	Tulsa, Oklahoma	OK	Active	
**Gamma Alpha**	May 10, 1947	University of Tennessee	Knoxville, Tennessee	TN	Active	
**Gamma Epsilon**	December 6, 1947	Kent State University	Kent, Ohio	OH	Active	
Gamma Gamma	March 13, 1948 – 1959	University of Texas at El Paso	El Paso, Texas	TX	Inactive	
**Gamma Delta**	January 31, 1948 – 1991; 2020	Montana State University	Bozeman, Montana	MT	Active	
**Gamma Zeta**	March 20, 1948	Louisiana State University	Baton Rouge, Louisiana	LA	Active	
**Gamma Eta**	February 7, 1948	San Jose State University	San Jose, California	CA	Active	
**Gamma Kappa**	January 28, 1949	University of California, Santa Barbara	Santa Barbara, California	CA	Active	
**Gamma Theta**	April 9, 1949	University of Florida	Gainesville, Florida	FL	Active	
**Gamma Iota**	December 3, 1949	DePauw University	Greencastle, Indiana	IN	Active	
**Gamma Lambda**	April 5, 1951	California State University, Fresno	Fresno, California	CA	Active	
**Gamma Mu**	September 19, 1951	Florida State University	Tallahassee, Florida	FL	Active	
**Gamma Nu**	November 22, 1953 – 1976; 2007	University of North Texas	Denton, Texas	TX	Active	
Gamma Omicron	May 15, 1954 - September 28, 2025	Indiana State University	Terre Haute, Indiana	IN	Inactive	
**Gamma Xi**	April 6, 1954	Texas Tech University	Lubbock, Texas	TX	Active	
**Gamma Pi**	May 5, 1955	Roanoke College	Salem, Virginia	VA	Active	
**Gamma Sigma**	February 4, 1956	University of Houston	Houston, Texas	TX	Active	
**Gamma Rho**	March 10, 1956	Wittenberg University	Springfield, Ohio	OH	Active	
**Gamma Tau**	September 29, 1956	Texas Christian University	Fort Worth, Texas	TX	Active	
**Gamma Upsilon**	February 1, 1958	Wichita State University	Wichita, Kansas	KS	Active	
**Gamma Phi**	May 10, 1958	Arizona State University	Tempe, Arizona	AZ	Active	
**Gamma Chi**	March 7, 1959	California State University, Long Beach	Long Beach, California	CA	Active	
Gamma Psi	May 8, 1959 – 1968; 1989–1994	Emory University	Atlanta, Georgia	GA	Inactive	
**Delta Epsilon**	December 4, 1959	University of the Pacific	Stockton, California	CA	Active	
Gamma Omega (see Upsilon)	December 3, 1960 – 1970	St. Lawrence University	Canton, New York	NY	Inactive	(Note: Revival of the Upsilon chapter which went dormant in 1887.)
Delta Alpha	May 20, 1961 – 1963	University of New Mexico	Albuquerque, New Mexico	NM	Inactive	
**Delta Beta**	May 3, 1962	University of Kentucky	Lexington, Kentucky	KY	Active	
Delta Zeta	March 6, 1965–2024	University of Memphis	Memphis, Tennessee	TN	Inactive	
**Delta Eta**	November 5, 1966	California State University, Sacramento	Sacramento, California	CA	Active	
Delta Theta	May 6, 1967 – 1987	Georgia State University	Atlanta, Georgia	GA	Inactive	
**Delta Iota**	February 17, 1968	University of Georgia	Athens, Georgia	GA	Active	
**Delta Kappa**	February 24, 1968	University of South Florida	Tampa, Florida	FL	Active	
**Delta Lambda**	October 25, 1969	Mississippi State University	Starkville, Mississippi	MS	Active	
Delta Mu	December 6, 1969 – 1977	Florida Atlantic University	Boca Raton, Florida	FL	Inactive	
**Delta Nu**	December 6, 1969	Northern Illinois University	DeKalb, Illinois	IL	Active	
Delta Xi	April 11, 1970 – 1985	Ball State University	Muncie, Indiana	IN	Inactive	
**Delta Omicron**	May 9, 1970	Morehead State University	Morehead, Kentucky	KY	Active	
**Delta Pi**	March 1, 1971	University of Southern Mississippi	Hattiesburg, Mississippi	MS	Active	
**Delta Rho**	October 16, 1971	Virginia Tech	Blacksburg, Virginia	VA	Active	
**Delta Sigma**	May 19, 1972 – 1988; 2003	Auburn University	Auburn, Alabama	AL	Active	
Delta Tau	November 14, 1972 – 1984	Missouri Southern State University	Joplin, Missouri	MO	Inactive	
Delta Upsilon	May 12, 1973 – 2005	Purdue University Fort Wayne	Fort Wayne, Indiana	IN	Inactive	
**Delta Phi**	February 2, 1974	University of California, Irvine	Irvine, California	CA	Active	
**Delta Chi**	January 18, 1975	University of California, Davis	Davis, California	CA	Active	
Delta Psi	April 23, 1977 – 1985	Baylor University	Waco, Texas	TX	Inactive	
**Delta Omega**	April 30, 1977	William Woods University	Fulton, Missouri	MO	Active	
Epsilon Alpha	April 8, 1978 – 2000	Union College	Schenectady, New York	NY	Inactive	
**Epsilon Beta**	November 18, 1978	Bucknell University	Lewisburg, Pennsylvania	PA	Active	
**Epsilon Gamma**	November 18, 1978	University of Virginia	Charlottesville, Virginia	VA	Active	
**Epsilon Delta**	November 17, 1979	Washington & Jefferson College	Washington, Pennsylvania	PA	Active	
**Epsilon Epsilon**	November 8, 1980	Tennessee Technological University	Cookeville, Tennessee	TN	Active	
**Epsilon Zeta**	February 1, 1981	Loyola Marymount University	Los Angeles, California	CA	Active	
**Epsilon Eta**	March 21, 1981	Indiana University of Pennsylvania	Indiana County, Pennsylvania	PA	Active	
**Epsilon Theta**	April 12, 1981	University of Tampa	Tampa, Florida	FL	Active	
**Epsilon Iota**	May 31, 1981	University of California, San Diego	San Diego, California	CA	Active	
**Epsilon Kappa**	October 17, 1981 – 2003; November 6, 2021	Clemson University	Clemson, South Carolina	SC	Active	
Epsilon Lambda	February 20, 1982 – 2013	Lehigh University	Bethlehem, Pennsylvania	PA	Inactive	
**Epsilon Mu**	February 20, 1982	College of William & Mary	Williamsburg, Virginia	VA	Active	
Epsilon Nu	May 1, 1982 – January 22, 2021	James Madison University	Harrisonburg, Virginia	VA	Inactive	
**Epsilon Xi**	December 4, 1982	Lafayette College	Easton, Pennsylvania	PA	Active	
Epsilon Omicron	January 22, 1983 – 1985	University of Wyoming	Laramie, Wyoming	WY	Inactive	
Epsilon Pi	October 16, 1983 – 2017	University of Connecticut	Storrs, Connecticut	CT	Inactive	
**Epsilon Phi**	October 20, 1984	Loyola University New Orleans	New Orleans, Louisiana	LA	Active	
Epsilon Rho	November 17, 1984 – 2007	Western Michigan University	Kalamazoo, Michigan	MI	Inactive	
Epsilon Tau	January 26, 1985 – 2006	University of Central Florida	Orlando, Florida	FL	Inactive	
**Epsilon Sigma**	March 16, 1985	San Diego State University	San Diego, California	CA	Active	
Epsilon Upsilon	April 13, 1985 – 1987	Bradley University	Peoria, Illinois	IL	Inactive	
Epsilon Chi	October 19, 1985 – 2004	University of South Carolina	Columbia, South Carolina	SC	Inactive	
**Epsilon Psi**	November 2, 1985	Rutgers University	Rutgers, New Jersey	NJ	Active	
Epsilon Omega	May 3, 1986 – 2003	Louisiana Tech University	Ruston, Louisiana	LA	Inactive	
**Zeta Alpha**	September 20, 1986	Villanova University	Villanova University	PA	Active	
**Zeta Gamma**	May 2, 1987	University of Richmond	Richmond, Virginia	VA	Active	
Zeta Beta	May 9, 1987 – 1997	Dartmouth College	Hanover, New Hampshire	NH	Inactive	
**Zeta Delta**	September 26, 1987	University of Rochester	Rochester, New York	NY	Active	
**Zeta Epsilon**	November 21, 1987	Santa Clara University	Santa Clara, California	CA	Active	
**Zeta Zeta**	October 22, 1988	Boston University	Boston, Massachusetts	MA	Active	
**Zeta Eta**	April 30, 1988	Texas State University	San Marcos, Texas	TX	Active	
**Zeta Theta**	February 1, 1989	Columbia University	New York City, New York	NY	Active	
**Zeta Iota**	April 29, 1989	Chapman University	Orange, California	CA	Active	
Zeta Kappa	March 31, 1990 – 1995	Johns Hopkins University	Baltimore, Maryland	MD	Inactive	
**Zeta Lambda**	May 20, 1990	University of California, Riverside	Riverside, California	CA	Active	
**Zeta Nu**	February 2, 1991	University of Montevallo	Montevallo, Alabama	AL	Active	
**Zeta Xi**	February 2, 1991	University of Alabama at Birmingham	Birmingham, Alabama	AL	Active	
Zeta Omicron	April 14, 1991 – 2014	Wilfrid Laurier University	Waterloo, Ontario, Canada	ON	Inactive	
Zeta Pi	May 3, 1992 – 1999	Indiana University-Purdue University Indianapolis	Indianapolis, Indiana	IN	Inactive	
**Zeta Rho**	March 6, 1993	Ohio University	Athens, Ohio	OH	Active	
**Zeta Sigma**	August 14, 1993	Northern Kentucky University	Highland Heights, Kentucky	KY	Active	
Zeta Tau	December 12, 1993 – 1998	Wake Forest University	Winston-Salem, North Carolina	NC	Inactive	
**Zeta Upsilon**	January 10, 1994	Furman University	Greenville, South Carolina	SC	Active	
Zeta Chi	November 5, 1994 – January 22, 2020	University of Delaware	Newark, Delaware	DE	Inactive	
Zeta Phi	November 12, 1994 – 2018	Harvard University	Cambridge, Massachusetts	MA	Inactive	
**Zeta Psi**	March 31, 1996	Salisbury University	Salisbury, Maryland	MD	Active	
Zeta Omega	April 20, 1996 – 1998	Kenyon College	Gambier, Ohio	OH	Inactive	
**Eta Alpha**	October 13, 1996	Pepperdine University	Malibu, California	CA	Active	
**Eta Beta**	November 16, 1996	University of Hartford	West Hartford, Connecticut	CT	Active	
**Eta Gamma**	April 27, 1997	Texas A&M University	College Station, Texas	TX	Active	
**Eta Delta**	November 13, 1999	University of North Florida	Jacksonville, Florida	FL	Active	
Eta Epsilon	April 16, 2000 – 2010	Vanderbilt University	Nashville, Tennessee	TN	Inactive	
**Eta Zeta**	February 11, 2001	University of Chicago	Chicago, Illinois	IL	Active	
**Eta Eta**	April 22, 2001	Spring Hill College	Mobile, Alabama	AL	Active	
**Eta Theta**	November 18, 2001	Saint Louis University	St. Louis, Missouri	MO	Active	
**Eta Iota**	February 2, 2002	University of Nevada, Reno	Reno, Nevada	NV	Active	
**Eta Kappa**	November 17, 2002	North Carolina State University	Raleigh, North Carolina	NC	Active	
**Eta Lambda**	December 5, 2004	New Mexico State University	Las Cruces, New Mexico	NM	Active	
**Eta Mu**	October 10, 2004	Lake Forest College	Lake Forest, Illinois	IL	Active	
**Eta Nu**	April 22, 2005	Hofstra University	Hempstead, New York	NY	Active	
**Eta Xi**	April 22, 2006	University of Texas at Tyler	Tyler, Texas	TX	Active	
**Eta Omicron**	April 14, 2007	University of Arkansas–Fort Smith	Fort Smith, Arkansas	AR	Active	
**Eta Pi**	November 18, 2007	DePaul University	Chicago, Illinois	IL	Active	
**Eta Rho**	April 25, 2009	University of California, Merced	Merced, California	CA	Active	
**Eta Sigma**	April 18, 2010	College of Charleston	Charleston, South Carolina	SC	Active	
**Eta Tau**	November 15, 2014	Christopher Newport University	Newport News, Virginia	VA	Active	
**Eta Upsilon**	January 9, 2016	Drexel University	Philadelphia, Pennsylvania	PA	Active	
**Eta Phi**	April 21, 2016	New York University	New York City, New York	NY	Active	
**Eta Chi**	April 28, 2016	Georgia College & State University	Milledgeville, Georgia	GA	Active	
**Eta Psi**	January 28, 2017	Iowa State University	Ames, Iowa	IA	Active	
Eta Omega	December 3, 2017 – 2024	Portland State University	Portland, Oregon	OR	Inactive	
**Theta Alpha**	March 10, 2018	California Polytechnic State University, San Luis Obispo	San Luis Obispo, California	CA	Active	
**Theta Beta** (see Theta II)	April 4, 2004	Case Western Reserve University	Cleveland, Ohio	OH	Active	(Note: Originally the Theta chapter. Re-established in 2004 from Theta Beta (local), established in 2003, and awarded that name as a chapter designation.)
**Theta Gamma**	April 7, 2018	University of North Carolina Wilmington	Wilmington, North Carolina	NC	Active	
**Theta Delta**	April 21, 2018	Brown University	Providence, Rhode Island	RI	Active	
Theta Epsilon	December 1, 2018 – 2022	Grand Valley State University	Allendale, Michigan	MI	Inactive	
**Theta Zeta**	November 9, 2019	Florida Gulf Coast University	Fort Myers, Florida	FL	Active	
**Theta Eta**	March 29, 2025	Northeastern University	Boston, Massachusetts	MA	Active	

== Alumnae chapters ==
Following are the alumnae chapters of Delta Gamma, with active chapters indicated in bold and inactive chapters italics.

Chapter	Location	Status	Ref.
**Akron Alumnae Chapter**	Akron, Ohio	Active	
**Alberta Alumnae Chapter**	Edmonton, Alberta, Canada	Active	
**Ann Arbor Alumnae Chapter**	Ann Arbor, Michigan	Active	
**Arlington Alumnae Chapter**	Arlington, Texas	Active	
**Atlanta Alumnae Chapter**	Atlanta, Georgia	Active	
**Austin Alumnae Chapter**	Austin, Texas	Active	
**Baltimore Alumnae Chapter**	Baltimore, Maryland	Active	
**Baton Rouge Alumnae Chapter**	Baton Rouge, Louisiana	Active	
Bellevue-Mercer Island Alumnae Chapter	Bellevue and Mercer Island, Washington	Inactive	
**Birmingham, AL Alumnae Chapter**	Birmingham, Alabama	Active	
**Boston Alumnae Chapter**	Boston, Massachusetts	Active	
**Boulder Alumnae Chapter**	Boulder, Colorado	Active	
**Central Florida Alumnae Chapter**	Central Florida	Active	
**Central New Jersey Alumnae Chapter**	Central Jersey, New Jersey	Active	
**Chapel Hill/Durham Alumnae Chapter**	Chapel Hill and Durham, North Carolina	Active	
Charleston-WV Alumnae Chapter	Charleston, West Virginia	Inactive	
**Charlotte Area Alumnae Chapter**	Charlotte, North Carolina	Active	
**Chicago (city) Alumnae Chapter**	Chicago, Illinois	Active	
Chicago Far North Alumnae Chapter	Far North Chicago, Illinois	Inactive	
**Chicago North Shore Alumnae Chapter**	Chicago North Shore, Illinois	Active	
**Chicago Northwest Suburban Alumnae Chapter**	Northwest Chicago, Illinois	Active	
**Chicago West Suburban Alumnae Chapter**	West Chicago, Illinois	Active	
**Cincinnati Alumnae Chapter**	Cincinnati, Ohio	Active	
**Clearwater Alumnae Chapter**	Clearwater, Florida	Active	
**Cleveland East Alumnae Chapter**	Cleveland, Ohio	Active	
**Cleveland West Shore Alumnae Chapter**	Cleveland, Ohio	Active	
**Colorado Springs Alumnae Chapter**	Colorado Springs, Colorado	Active	
**Columbus Alumnae Chapter**	Columbus, Ohio	Active	
**Connecticut-Westchester Alumnae Chapter**	Westchester, Connecticut	Active	
**Corpus Christi Alumnae Chapter**	Corpus Christi, Texas	Active	
**Dallas Alumnae Chapter**	Dallas, Texas	Active	
Dallas Coordinating Committee Alumnae Chapter	Dallas, Texas	Inactive	
Dallas Night Alumnae Chapter	Dallas, Texas	Inactive	
**Dallas North Cities Alumnae Chapter**	North Dallas, Texas	Active	
**Denver Alumnae Chapter**	Denver, Colorado	Active	
Denver Evening Alumnae Chapter	Denver, Colorado	Inactive	
**Des Moines Alumnae Chapter**	Des Moines, Iowa	Active	
Desert Empire Alumnae Chapter	Desert Empire, California	Inactive	
**Detroit West Suburban Alumnae Chapter**	Detroit, Michigan	Active	
**Diablo Valley Alumnae Chapter**	Diablo Valley, California	Active	
**East Bay Alumnae Chapter**	East Bay, California	Active	
**Evansville Alumnae Chapter**	Evansville, Indiana	Active	
**Fort Myers Area Alumnae Chapter**	Fort Myers, Florida	Active	
**Fort Wayne Alumnae Chapter**	Fort Wayne, Indiana	Active	
**Fort Worth Alumnae Chapter**	Fort Worth, Texas	Active	
**Fresno Alumnae Chapter**	Fresno, California	Active	
**Ft Lauderdale/Broward County Alumnae Chapter**	Fort Lauderdale and Broward County, Florida	Active	
**Glendale/Burbank Alumnae Chapter**	Glendale and Burbank, California	Active	
**Grand Rapids Alumnae Chapter**	Grand Rapids, Michigan	Active	
**Greater Indianapolis Alumnae Chapter**	Indianapolis, Indiana	Active	
**Greater Kansas City Alumnae Chapter**	Kansas City, Missouri and Kansas City, Kansas	Active	
**Greater Little Rock Alumnae Chapter**	Little Rock, Arkansas	Active	
**Greater Naples Alumnae Chapter**	Naples, Florida	Active	
**Greater Palm Beaches Alumnae Chapter**	Palm Beach, Florida	Active	
Houston After Five Alumnae Chapter	Houston, Texas	Inactive	
**Houston Alumnae Chapter**	Houston, Texas	Active	
Houston Memorial Alumnae Chapter	Memorial, Houston, Texas	Inactive	
Houston Northeast Alumnae Chapter	Northeast Houston, Texas	Inactive	
**Houston Northwest Alumnae Chapter**	Northwest Houston, Texas	Active	
**Houston-Montgomery County Alumnae Chapter**	Houston and Montgomery County, Texas	Active	
**Inland Empire Alumnae Chapter**	Inland Empire, California	Active	
**Jackson Alumnae Chapter**	Jackson, Mississippi	Active	
**Jacksonville Alumnae Chapter**	Jacksonville, Florida	Active	
King County Alumnae Chapter	King County, Washington	Inactive	
**Knoxville Alumnae Chapter**	Knoxville, Tennessee	Active	
LA-Beverly-Westwood Alumnae Chapter	Los Angeles, Beverly Hills, and Westwood, California	Inactive	
**Las Vegas Alumnae Chapter**	Las Vegas, Nevada	Active	
**Lincoln Alumnae Chapter**	Lincoln, Nebraska	Active	
**Long Beach Alumnae Chapter**	Long Beach, California	Active	
**Los Angeles Alumnae Chapter**	Los Angeles, California	Active	
**Louisville Alumnae Chapter**	Louisville, Kentucky	Active	
**Lubbock Alumnae Chapter**	Lubbock, Texas	Active	
**Memphis Alumnae Chapter**	Memphis, Tennessee	Active	
**Miami Alumnae Chapter**	Miami, Florida	Active	
**Milwaukee Alumnae Chapter**	Milwaukee, Wisconsin	Active	
**Minneapolis-St Paul Alumnae Chapter**	Minneapolis and Saint Paul, Minnesota	Active	
**Missoula Alumnae Chapter**	Missoula, Montana	Active	
**Nashville Alumnae Chapter**	Nashville, Tennessee	Active	
**New Mexico-El Paso Alumnae Chapter**	El Paso, New Mexico	Active	
**New Orleans Alumnae Chapter**	New Orleans, Louisiana	Active	
**New York City Alumnae Chapter**	New York City, New York	Active	
Newport Harbor Alumnae Chapter	Orange County, California	Inactive	
**Newport-South Coast Alumnae Chapter**	South Coast and Newport, California	Active	
**Norman Alumnae Chapter**	Norman, Oklahoma	Active	
**North Orange County Alumnae Chapter**	North Orange County, California	Active	
**Northeast Mississippi Alumnae Chapter**	Northeast Mississippi	Active	
**Northern Colorado Alumnae Chapter**	Fort Collins, Colorado	Active	
**Northern Nevada Alumnae Chapter**	Northern Nevada	Active	
**Northern Virginia Alumnae Chapter**	Northern Virginia	Active	
**Northwest Arkansas Alumnae Chapter**	Northwest Arkansas	Active	
**Oklahoma City Alumnae Chapter**	Oklahoma City, Oklahoma	Active	
**Omaha Alumnae Chapter**	Omaha, Nebraska	Active	
**Oxford, MS Alumnae Chapter**	Oxford, Mississippi	Active	
Pasadena Alumnae Chapter	Pasadena, California	Inactive	
**Philadelphia Suburban Alumnae Chapter**	Philadelphia, Pennsylvania	Active	
**Phoenix Alumnae Chapter**	Phoenix, Arizona	Active	
**Pittsburgh South Hills Alumnae Chapter**	Pittsburgh and South Hills, Pennsylvania	Active	
**Ponte Vedra Beaches Alumnae Chapter**	Ponte Vedra Beach, Florida	Active	
**Portland Suburban Alumnae Chapter**	Portland, Oregon	Active	
**Raleigh/Cary Alumnae Chapter**	Raleigh and Cary, North Carolina	Active	
**Richmond Alumnae Chapter**	Richmond, Virginia	Active	
**Roanoke Valley Alumnae Chapter**	Roanoke, Virginia	Active	
**Sacramento Alumnae Chapter**	Sacramento, California	Active	
**Saint Louis Area Alumnae Chapter**	St. Louis, Missouri	Active	
Saint Louis Day Alumnae Chapter	St. Louis, Missouri	Inactive	
Saint Louis Evening Alumnae Chapter	St. Louis, Missouri	Inactive	
**Salt Lake City Alumnae Chapter**	Salt Lake City, Utah	Active	
**San Antonio Alumnae Chapter**	San Antonio, Texas	Active	
**San Diego Alumnae Chapter**	San Diego, California	Active	
**San Fernando Valley Alumnae Chapter**	San Fernando Valley, California	Active	
**San Francisco Alumnae Chapter**	San Francisco, California	Active	
San Mateo County Alumnae Chapter	San Mateo, California	Inactive	
**Santa Barbara Alumnae Chapter**	Santa Barbara, California	Active	
Santa Rosa Area Alumnae Chapter	Santa Rosa, California	Inactive	
**Sarasota Alumnae Chapter**	Sarasota, Florida	Active	
**Seattle Area Alumnae Chapter**	Seattle, Washington	Active	
**Silicon Valley Alumnae Chapter**	Silicon Valley, California	Active	
**South Bay Alumnae Chapter**	South Bay, California	Active	
**South Orange County Alumnae Chapter**	South Orange County, California	Active	
South Santa Clara Valley Alumnae Chapter	South Santa Clara Valley, California	Inactive	
**Southeast Washington Alumnae Chapter**	Kennewick, Washington	Active	
**Spokane Alumnae Chapter**	Spokane, Washington	Active	
**Summit-Westfield Alumnae Chapter**	Summit and Westfield, New Jersey	Active	
**Tampa Alumnae Chapter**	Tampa, Florida	Active	
**Topeka Alumnae Chapter**	Topeka, Kansas	Active	
**Tucson Alumnae Chapter**	Tucson, Arizona	Active	
**Tulsa Alumnae Chapter**	Tulsa, Oklahoma	Active	
**Upstate Carolina Alumnae Chapter**	Upstate South Carolina	Active	
**Vancouver BC Alumnae Chapter**	Vancouver, British Columbia, Canada	Active	
**Virginia Tidewater Alumnae Chapter**	Tidewater Virginia	Active	
**Washington DC Alumnae Chapter**	Washington, D.C.	Active	
**Wichita Alumnae Chapter**	Wichita, Kansas	Active	
Williamsburg/Peninsula Alumnae Chapter	Williamsburg, Virginia	Inactive	
