= Vicky M. Wilkins =

U.S. academic administrator

- Education: Northern Michigan University; Chapman University; University of Missouri
- Scientific career
- Fields: Public administration
- Workplaces: University of Georgia; American University School of Public Affairs

Vicky M. Wilkins is an American public administration scholar and academic administrator serving as the provost of American University. She is a professor of public administration and policy and previously served as the dean of the American University School of Public Affairs from 2018 to 2023.

== Life ==
Wilkins earned a B.S. in political science and history from Northern Michigan University. She completed a M.S. in human resource management from Chapman University and a Ph.D. in political science from the University of Missouri.

Wilkins worked for almost eleven years as a faculty member at the University of Georgia. She was the graduate coordinator and director of the M.P.A. program. In 2014, Wilkins became the senior associate dean of the American University School of Public Affairs (SPA). In 2017, she served as the president of the public administration section of the American Political Science Association. On July 3 that year, she became the interim dean of SPA, succeeding Barbara Romzek. She became its dean in 2018. Wilkins is also a professor of public administration and policy. She researches representative bureaucracy, bureaucratic discretion, race and gender, and human resource management. In 2021, Wilkins was elected a fellow of the National Academy of Public Administration.

On July 1, 2023, Wilkins succeeded Peter Starr as the acting provost of American University. On April 24th, 2025, Wilkins was named as provost.
