= Jennifer L. Lawless =

American academic

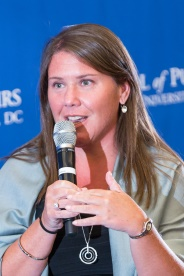
- Jennifer Lawless speaks at a 2015 book event.
- Born: Jennifer Leigh Lawless; March 12, 1975 (age 51)

Academic background
- Education: Union College (B.A.); Stanford University (M.A.; Ph.D.)
- Thesis: Women and elections: Do they run? Do they win? Does it matter? (2003)

Jennifer L. Lawless (born March 12, 1975) serves as the Commonwealth Professor of Politics of the University of Virginia and a faculty affiliate of the Frank Batten School of Leadership and Public Policy, in addition to being a non-resident senior fellow in governance studies at the Brookings Institution.

== Early life & education ==
Lawless was born on March 12, 1975, to John Lawless and Marjorie Mensch. Her father was a Wall Street broker for Dean Witter Reynolds for over 30 years. Her mother was an executive director of the housing authority of Middletown, New York. Lawless graduated from Middletown High School in 1993. She turned down a full scholarship to Columbia University to attend Union College, where she received her B.A. from in 1997 and her Ph.D. from Stanford University in 2003; both degrees were in political science. Her doctoral dissertation was entitled "Women and Elections: Do They Run? Do They Win? Does it Matter?"

== Career ==
Lawless was hired as an assistant professor of political science and public policy at Brown University from July 2003 to June 2009, and was an associate professor from July to August 2009. She then joined the American University faculty in September 2009 as an associate professor of government and director of the Women & Politics Institute. Lawless later became a full professor in June 2013, and in April 2014 she became a non-resident senior fellow in governance studies at the Brookings Institution. In August 2018 Lawless left American University to become the Commonwealth Professor of Politics at the University of Virginia and a faculty affiliate of the Frank Batten School of Leadership and Public Policy.

The central focuses of Lawless’s courses and research are women and politics, campaigns, and elections. Courses she taught at American University include: "Women & Politics," "Women & Political Leadership," and "Women, Politics & Public Policy." Her research regarding female candidates and election results is published in a number of political science journals, including American Journal of Political Science, Perspectives on Politics, Political Research Quarterly, Legislative Studies Quarterly, The Journal of Politics, Politics & Gender, and Journal of Women, Politics & Policy. News outlets regularly quote this scholarship, particularly during campaign season. Her commentary has appeared in newspapers such as The New York Times, The Wall Street Journal, USA Today and other local publications. She has also been cited on CNN.com, MSNBC.com, and FOXNews.com and has published on CNN Opinion on CNN.com.

=== Authorship ===
With Richard L. Fox, Lawless is the co-author of three books: "It Takes A Candidate: Why Women Don't Run for Office". "It Still Takes A Candidate: Why Women Don't Run for Office" and "Running from Office: Why Young Americans Are Turned Off to Politics". She is also the author of "Becoming a Candidate: Political Ambition and the Decision to Run for Office", and of multiple Brookings Institution reports, which Emerge America, the Women’s Campaign Forum, and other women’s organizations that recruit female political candidates frequently utilize for their own work.

=== Electoral history ===
In 2006, Lawless ran for the U.S. House of Representatives in the Democratic Primary in Rhode Island's 2nd congressional district. She did not win the primary and has not run in another election since.

2006 Rhode Island 2nd Congressional District Democratic primary results
Party	Candidate	Votes	%
Democratic	James Langevin (incumbent)	24,985	61.78
Democratic	Jennifer L. Lawless	15,456	38.22
Total votes		40,441	100.0

== Bibliography ==
Books

- Lawless, Jennifer L.; Fox, Richard L. (2005). It takes a candidate: why women don't run for office. Cambridge New York: Cambridge University Press. ISBN 9780521674140.
- Lawless, Jennifer L.; Fox, Richard L. (2010). It still takes a candidate: why women don't run for office. New York: Cambridge University Press. ISBN 9780521762526. Details.
- Lawless, Jennifer L. (2012). Becoming a candidate: political ambition and the decision to run for office. Cambridge New York: Cambridge University Press. ISBN 9780521756600. Details.
- Lawless, Jennifer L.; Fox, Richard L. (2015). Running from office: why young Americans are turned off to politics. Oxford New York: Oxford University Press. ISBN 9780199397655. Details.
- Lawless, Jennifer L.; Hayes, Danny (2016). Women on the run: gender, media, and political campaigns in a polarized era. New York, NY: Cambridge University Press. ISBN 9781107115583.

Journal articles

- Lawless, Jennifer L.; Fox, Richard L. (1999). "Women candidates in Kenya: political socialization and representation". Women & Politics. 20 (4): 49–76. doi:10.1300/J014v20n04_03.
- Lawless, Jennifer L. (August 2001). "Political participation of the urban poor". Social Problems. 48 (3): 362–385. doi:10.1525/sp.2001.48.3.362. JSTOR 10.1525/sp.2001.48.3.362. Pdf.
- Lawless, Jennifer L.; Fox, Richard L.; Feeley, Courtney (August 2001). "Gender and the decision to run for office". Legislative Studies Quarterly. 26 (3): 411–435. JSTOR 440330.
- Lawless, Jennifer L.; Fox, Richard L. (2003). "Family structure, sex-role socialization, and the decision to run for office". Women & Politics. 24 (4): 19–48. doi:10.1300/J014v24n04_02. S2CID 44010204. Pdf.
- Lawless, Jennifer L. (March 2004). "Politics of presence: women in the house and symbolic representation". Political Research Quarterly. 57 (1): 81–99. doi:10.1177/106591290405700107. S2CID 144379702.
- Lawless, Jennifer L.; Fox, Richard L. (April 2004). "Entering the arena? Gender and the decision to run for office". American Journal of Political Science. 48 (2): 264–280. doi:10.1111/j.0092-5853.2004.00069.x. JSTOR 1519882. Pdf.
- Lawless, Jennifer L. (September 2004). "Women, war, and winning elections: gender stereotyping in the post September 11th era". Political Research Quarterly. 57 (3): 479–490. doi:10.1177/106591290405700312. S2CID 153595611.
- Lawless, Jennifer L.; Fox, Richard L. (July 2005). "To run or not to run for office: explaining nascent political ambition". American Journal of Political Science. 49 (3): 642–659. doi:10.1111/j.1540-5907.2005.00147.x. JSTOR 3647737.
- Lawless, Jennifer L.; Theriault, Sean M. (November 2005). "Will she stay or will she go? Career ceilings and women's retirement from the U.S. Congress". Legislative Studies Quarterly. 30 (4): 581–596. doi:10.3162/036298005X201680.
- Lawless, Jennifer L.; Pearson, Kathryn (January 2008). "The primary reason for women's under-representation: re-evaluating the conventional wisdom". The Journal of Politics. 70 (1): 67–82. doi:10.1017/S002238160708005X. JSTOR 10.1017/s002238160708005x. S2CID 140881858.
- Lawless, Jennifer L. (March 2009). "Sexism and gender bias in Election 2008: a more complex path for women in politics". Politics & Gender. 5 (1): 70–80. doi:10.1017/S1743923X09000051. S2CID 145616826.
- Lawless, Jennifer L.; Fowler, Linda (September 2009). "Looking for sex in all the wrong places: press coverage and the electoral fortunes of gubernatorial candidates". Perspectives on Politics. 7 (3): 519–536. doi:10.1017/S1537592709990843. JSTOR 40407002. S2CID 145582995.
- Lawless, Jennifer L.; Fox, Richard L. (April 2010). "If only they'd ask: gender, recruitment, and political ambition". The Journal of Politics. 72 (2): 310–336. doi:10.1017/s0022381609990752. JSTOR 10.1017/s0022381609990752. S2CID 73604517. Pdf.
- Lawless, Jennifer L.; Fox, Richard L. (January 2011). "Gendered perceptions and political candidacies: a central barrier to women's equality in electoral politics". American Journal of Political Science. 55 (1): 59–73. doi:10.1111/j.1540-5907.2010.00484.x. JSTOR 25766254. S2CID 143095378. SSRN 1642030. Pdf.
- Lawless, Jennifer L.; Fox, Richard L. (April 2011). "Gaining and losing interest in running for office: developing the concept of dynamic political ambition". The Journal of Politics. 73 (2): 443–462. doi:10.1017/S0022381611000120. JSTOR 10.1017/S0022381611000120. SSRN 1450641. Pdf.
- Lawless, Jennifer L.; Fox, Richard L. (April 2014). "Reconciling family roles with political ambition: the new normal for women in twenty-first century U.S. politics". The Journal of Politics. 76 (2): 398–414. doi:10.1017/s0022381613001473. JSTOR 10.1017/s0022381613001473.
- Lawless, Jennifer L.; Fox, Richard L. (August 2014). "Uncovering the origins of the gender gap in political ambition". American Political Science Review. 108 (3): 499–519. doi:10.1017/S0003055414000227. SSRN 2300724. Pdf.
- Lawless, Jennifer L.; Hayes, Danny; Baitinger, Gail (December 2014). "Who cares what they wear? Media, gender, and the influence of candidate appearance". Social Science Quarterly. 95 (5): 1194–1212. doi:10.1111/ssqu.12113. Pdf.
- Lawless, Jennifer L.; Hayes, Danny (March 2015). "A non-gendered lens? Media, voters, and female candidates in contemporary congressional elections". Perspectives on Politics. 13 (1): 95–118. doi:10.1017/S1537592714003156. S2CID 41192766. Pdf.
- Lawless, Jennifer L.; Hayes, Danny (April 2015). "As local news goes, so goes citizen engagement: media, knowledge, and participation in U.S. house elections". The Journal of Politics. 77 (2): 447–462. doi:10.1086/679749. JSTOR 10.1086/679749. S2CID 28762271. SSRN 245207. Pdf.
- Lawless, Jennifer L. (May 2015). "Female candidates and legislators". Annual Review of Political Science. 18: 349–366. doi:10.1146/annurev-polisci-020614-094613.

Papers

- Lawless, Jennifer L.; Fox, Richard L. (January 2004). Why don't women run for office (PDF). Brown Policy Report. The Taubman Center for Public Policy, Brown University. Archived from the original (PDF) on April 15, 2015.
- Lawless, Jennifer L.; Fox, Richard L. (May 2008). Why are women still not running for public office?. Issues in Governance Studies #16. Brookings Institution. Pdf.

== Filmography ==
Year	Title	Role	Director	Notes	Ref.
2011	Miss Representation	Herself	Jennifer Siebel	Then Associate Professor of Government and Director of the Women & Politics Institute^{[A]} at American University	

^{A} The documentary lists the center as the "Women in Politics Institute"
