= Institute of Politics at Harvard Kennedy School =

Harvard political science department

- Parent institution: Harvard Kennedy School
- Established: 1966; 60 years ago
- Mission: To inspire students to consider careers in politics and public service.
- Director: Betsy Martin
- Address: 79 John F. Kennedy St, Cambridge, Massachusetts, U.S.
- Coordinates: 42.37145°N 71.12210°W
- Website: iop.harvard.edu

The Institute of Politics at Harvard Kennedy School (IOP) is a nonpartisan extracurricular program associated with the Harvard Kennedy School at Harvard University. It was created in 1966 to serve as a living memorial to President John F. Kennedy and to inspire Harvard undergraduates to consider careers in politics and public service.

== History ==
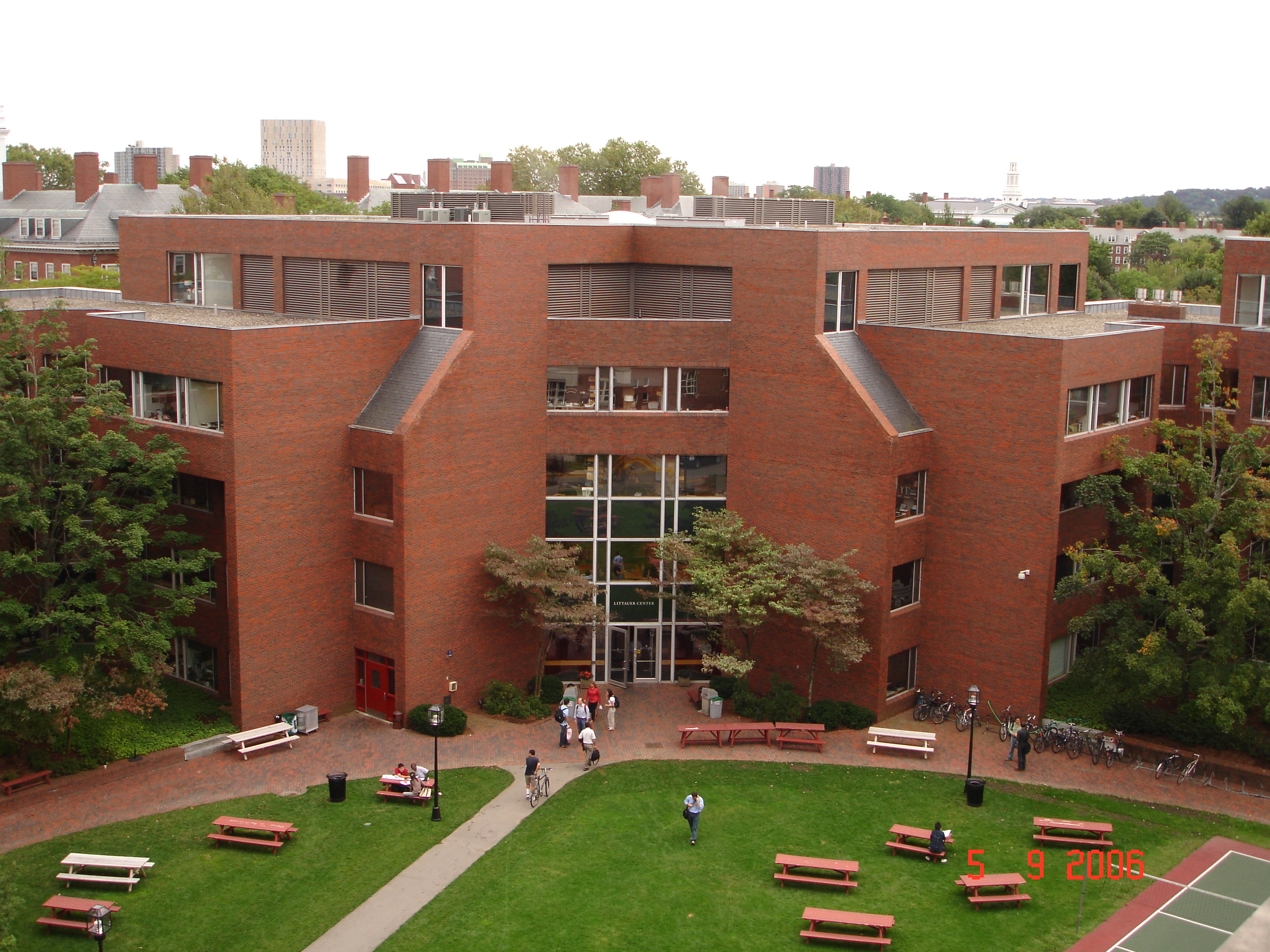
The Harvard Institute of Politics at Harvard Kennedy School

Following the assassination of President John F. Kennedy on November 22, 1963, the Kennedy Library Corporation raised more than $20 million for both the construction of the John F. Kennedy Presidential Library and Museum in Boston, and the creation and endowment of an institute at Harvard University dedicated to the study of politics and public affairs. More than 30 million people from around the world, including school children, contributed to the fund. In 1966, the Kennedy Library Corporation presented Harvard University with an endowment for the creation of the Institute of Politics.

The IOP does not offer formal courses or degree-granting programs. The IOP hosts the John F. Kennedy Jr. Forum, located at the Harvard Kennedy School. The forum regularly hosts speeches, debates, and panel discussions.

Since its founding in 1978, the Forum has hosted more than 1,000 events, seen by live audiences totaling more than 650,000 people and millions more via cable television, teleconferencing, and the Internet. Originally known as the KSG Forum, it was renamed in 2002 in tribute to the president's son, who had served on the Institute of Politics' board of directors until his death in 1999. The forum was renovated in 2003.

== Organizations ==
=== Harvard Votes Challenge ===
In 2018, students at the IOP started the Harvard Votes Challenge (HVC) in collaboration with the Ash Center for Democratic Governance and Innovation. The university-wide initiative "strives to build a civic culture at Harvard University by increasing voter registration and participation among students, staff, and faculty." During the 2018 midterm election, HVC launched the first-ever Harvard-Yale Votes Challenge. HVC integrated voter engagement and registration into First-Year Orientation in 2019.

For the 2020 election, 390 volunteers from all 12 degree-granting Harvard schools worked to mobilize voters during the COVID-19 pandemic. Organizers sent 94,297 text messages, distributed over 1700 stamps to students, and recruited 121 campus organizations to a pledge committing to 100% voter participation.

=== Global Affairs Program ===
The Global Affairs Program (GAP) is the first and only program at the IOP focused on international relations and diplomacy. It was founded on the principles of academic inquiry and professional development, and its program is designed to expose students to diverse global perspectives. GAP is centered around its two speaker series, Diplomatic Dialogues and World Stage. GAP also hosts career events and has a mentorship program.

=== Harvard Public Opinion Project ===
Founded in 2000, the Harvard Public Opinion Project (HPOP) aims to track young Americans' (18- to 29-year-olds) attitudes toward politics and public service. Undergraduate members, in conjunction with the IOP's director of polling, John Della Volpe, conduct the largest national survey of the millennial generation. These form a tracking poll in the fall and a more comprehensive poll in the spring. After analyzing the data, the committee shares its findings in a nationally covered media release.

=== Policy Program ===
The Policy Program is an undergraduate-run think tank dedicated to developing policy recommendations. Participants collaborate on research projects that have contributed to the development of new legislation, the establishment of community programs, and the analysis of pressing issues affecting communities and states nationwide. Commissioners include individual senators, federal agencies such as the U.S. Department of Commerce, and international organizations such The Peace Corps.

=== Harvard Political Review ===
The IOP is also home to and publishes the Harvard Political Review (HPR), a quarterly, non-partisan journal of political affairs written, edited, and managed by Harvard College undergraduates.

=== Senior Advisory Committee ===
The following individuals make up the Senior Advisory Committee of the Institute of Politics:

- Michael Nutter, Chair
- David Axelrod
- Charles Frank Bolden Jr.
- LaTosha Brown
- Alex Burns
- Heather Campion
- Torie Clarke
- William D. Delahunt
- Joseph Kennedy III
- Susan Molinari
- Abby Phillip
- Olympia Snowe
- Michelle Wu

== See also ==
- Harvard University people
- Center for American Political Studies
