= Barbara Romzek =

U.S. academic administrator

- Education: Oakland University; Western Michigan University; University of Texas at Austin
- Scientific career
- Fields: Public administration
- Workplaces: University of Kansas; American University School of Public Affairs

Barbara S. Romzek is an American public administration scholar and former academic administrator. She is an expert on public management and accountability. Romzek was the dean of the American University School of Public Affairs from 2012 to 2017.

== Life ==
Romzek earned a B.A. in political science from Oakland University in 1970. She completed a M.A. in political science at the Western Michigan University in 1972. In 1979, she earned a Ph.D. in political science in the department of government at the University of Texas at Austin.

From 1979 to 1985, Romzek was an assistant professor in the department of political science at the University of Kansas. She was a research associate in its center for public affairs from 1981 to 1984. In 1985, Romzek was promoted to associate professor. From 1988 to 1993, she was the associate dean of social and behavioral sciences. She became a professor of public affairs and administration in 1995, serving in this role until 2012. In 1999, Romzek was elected a fellow of the National Academy of Public Administration. She was the interim dean of college of liberal arts and sciences from 2002 to 2009 and interim senior vice provost for academic affairs from 2009 to 2011.

Romzek became professor of public administration and policy and dean of the American University School of Public Affairs in 2012. She is an expert on public management and accountability. She was succeeded by Vicky M. Wilkins in 2017. Her five-year tenure as dean saw the school increase in rankings. Her supervisor, provost Scott Bass praised her performance.

== Selected works ==
- Dubnick, Melvin J.; Romzek, Barbara S. (1991). American Public Administration: Politics and the Management of Expectations. Macmillan Publishing Co. ISBN 978-0-02-330662-4.
- Ingraham, Patricia W.; Romzek, Barbara S., eds. (1991). New Paradigms for Government: Issues for the Changing Public Service (1st ed.). Jossey-Bass Publishers, Inc. OCLC 30318825.
- Radin, Beryl A.; Agranoff, Robert; Bowman, Ann O'M.; Buntz, C. Gregory; Ott, J. Steven; Romzek, Barbara S.; Wilson, Robert H. (1996). New Governance for Rural America: Creating Intergovernmental Partnerships. University Press of Kansas. doi:10.2307/j.ctv2mgg2t6. ISBN 978-0-7006-3400-2.
