= Cynt Marshall =

American business executive (born 1964)

Cynthia Marshall
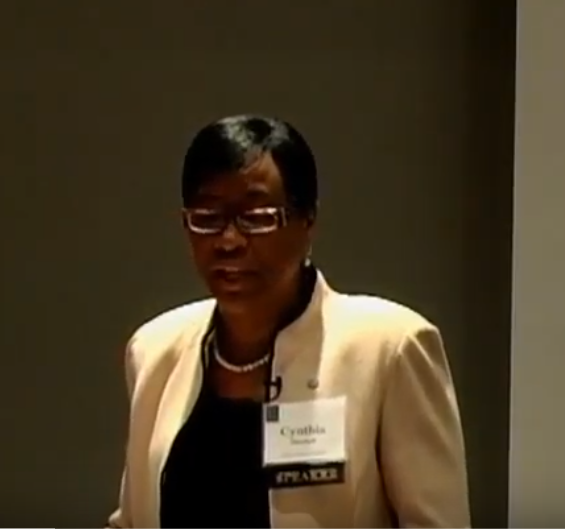
- Born: December 15, 1959 (age 66); Richmond, California
- Education: University of California, Berkeley
- Known for: former CEO of the Dallas Mavericks in the NBA
- Spouse: Kenneth Marshall
- Children: 4

Cynthia "Cynt" Marshall (born December 15, 1959) is the former chief executive officer of the Dallas Mavericks. In February 2018, Marshall became the first Black female CEO in the history of the National Basketball Association. Marshall was also one of her university's first African-American cheerleaders at the University of California, Berkeley in the late 1970s. Marshall worked for AT&T for 36 years in leadership role focused on improving workplace culture and encouraging diversity, equity and inclusion.

== Early life and education ==
Marshall moved from Birmingham, Alabama to California when she was three months old. Marshall was raised in Richmond, California with three siblings. She describes her childhood as being painful growing up in public housing projects with a family struggling to pay the bills. When she was 11 years old, Marshall witnessed her father shoot a man in the head in her defense.

Her mother, Carolyn Gardener, was a high school executive administrator and resource librarian. Back in 1975, as a young teenager of 15, she faced domestic abuse from her father. She attempted to protect her mother from the violence, and in doing so, her father ended up breaking her nose.

Marshall's mother was instrumental in her academic upbringing, she would put "a math book in one hand and the Bible in the other." While attending Kennedy High School in Richmond, CA, Marshall felt well-prepared for everything. Her hard work paid off when she earned a full scholarship to attend the University of California, Berkeley to study business administration and human resources management. While studying at Berkeley, Marshall became the university's first Black cheerleader and the first Black member of the Delta Gamma sorority chapter on campus, breaking barriers in inclusion. She turned to prayer when fans expressed negative comments about her while she was on the football field as a cheerleader.

After graduating from UC Berkeley as a first-generation college student with degrees in Business Administration and Human Resources Management at 21, she took on a job as a supervisor at AT&T. Marshall worked in executive roles at AT&T for 36 years, where she focused on improving diversity and workplace behavior. She retired in 2017, and founded the consulting firm Managing Resources. While at AT&T she became the first African American head of the North Carolina Chamber of Commerce.

== Dallas Mavericks ==
In 2018, Mark Cuban hired Marshall following allegations claiming 20 years of sexual harassment and workplace misconduct within the Mavericks organization. When Marshall began the role, there were no women or people of color on the leadership team and over time, women comprised half of the leadership.

Marshall announced her retirement from the organization in 2024; during her tenure, she launched a television partnership that afforded millions of Texans to watch Mavericks games for free, and she oversaw $30 million upgrades to the American Airlines Center where the Mavs play.

== Recognition and honors ==
In 2021, Forbes named Marshall one of the world's most inspiring female leaders, and Worth named Marshall as one of the 21 Most Powerful Women in the Business of Sports.

Marshall holds four honorary doctorate degrees.

== Personal life ==
Marshall prefers to be called "Cynt" as she acquired the nickname with her high school track team — "Cynt the Sprint."

During her marriage to husband Kenneth Marshall, they struggled to have children for ten years. Marshall had three miscarriages, one of which almost killed her, and the loss of a newborn daughter. In her book, You’ve Been Chosen: Thriving Through the Unexpected, published in 2022 by Random House, which covers her personal and professional life, Marshall chronicles her painful journey, ultimately adopting four children and beating her fight against stage 3 colon cancer.
