= Lewis School =

Finishing school in Oxford, Mississippi, US

- Oxford, Mississippi; United States

Information
- Other name: Mrs. Lewis' Female School; Miss Sallie Lewis’ School for Young Ladies
- School type: Private single-gender
- Established: c. 1849
- Closed: c. 1885
- Principal: Sallie Lewis
- Campus type: Urban

Lewis School was a female seminary school in Oxford, Mississippi in the United States. The school is notable as the founding location of the North American women's fraternity, Delta Gamma, in 1873.

== History ==
The Lewis School was founded sometime before 1849 in Oxford, Mississippi by a Mr. Lewis. It was operated in the mid-1850s by Mrs. C. W. Lewis. The school operated under various names. It was advertised as the Mrs. Lewis' Female School in 1866, when it opened for its sixth year in 1866, having been closed during the Civil War.

It became Miss Sallie Lewis’ School for Young Ladies when Sallie Lewis became its first "lady principal" in 1871. The school's enrollment declined after 1883 when women were allowed to attend the nearby University of Mississippi. The Lewis School closed a few years later.

== Campus ==
The college consisted of a small two-story frame building with a large porch in Oxford, Mississippi. It could accommodate 25 boarding students. The building was demolished.

== Academics ==
Lewis School was primarily a finishing school that also trained young women to become school teachers. It taught basic subjects such as arithmetic, reading, spelling, and writing. Advanced classes included botany, moral philosophy, music, rhetoric, and U.S. history. The school had thirty to forty female students, ages twelve to eighteen.

== Student life ==
In March 1849, the students of the academical division presented a banner to the local branch of the Sons of Temperance; they also performed an original song. The first chapter of the North American women's fraternity, Delta Gamma, was founded at the Lewis School in December 1873.

== Notable alumni ==
- Eva Webb Dodd – clubswoman who was a founder of Delta Gamma, a charter member of the Twentieth Century Club, and a member of the Mississippi Federation of Women’s Clubs
- Anna Boyd Ellington – educator and founder of Delta Gamma
- Mary Comfort Leonard – educator and founder of Delta Gamma
