= Christine Clifford =

American author and speaker

- Notable work: YOU, Inc. The Art of Selling Yourself
- Website: christineclifford.com

Christine Clifford is an American author and professional speaker based in Minneapolis, Minnesota. She is most known for her books Not Now…I’m Having a No Hair Day! which was released in 2005 and YOU, Inc. The Art of Selling Yourself, which was released in 2007.

In 1994, after Clifford was diagnosed with cancer, she started writing and drawing and ultimately left her job as a marketing executive. She has written eight books since. She is the CEO and owner of Christine Clifford Enterprises, an umbrella under which she operates four companies.

== Early life ==
Clifford was born in Michigan and raised in California. When she was 15, her mother was diagnosed with breast cancer. She died of cancer, four years later, when Clifford was 19.

== Career ==
During the early 1990s, Clifford was the Senior Executive Vice President of SPAR Marketing Services, a division of The SPAR Group, a merchandising and information services firm in New York City. In 1994, when she was diagnosed with cancer, she started writing and drawing about her cancer, which led her to quitting her job and becoming a full-time author. The books and cartoons led her to starting her first company The Cancer Club, an organization through which she arranges seminars and support groups as well as sells humorous and helpful products for people with cancer. She later became a professional speaker about a year after her cancer went into remission. Clifford received her Certified Speaking Professional designation from the National Speakers Association in 2002.

Clifford started a celebrity golf tournament called The Christine Clifford Celebrity Golf Invitational in 2006. The proceeds of the tournament were used for breast cancer research. By 2011, Clifford donated $1,000,000 through the money collected from the tournament. In 2013, she was informed that she got the cancer again, for which she had a double mastectomy. While going through treatment for cancer, this time she wrote her book Laugh 'Til It Heals: Notes from the World's Funniest Cancer Mailbox.

After her second divorce in 2010, Clifford founded Divorcing Divas with her friend Barbara Greenburg. Divorcing Divas produces seminars for the newly divorced. It also sums up her own post-divorce story. In 2011, the organization partnered with Tubman, a non-profit shelter in Minneapolis for abused women.

Clifford owns and operates Christine Clifford Enterprises, an umbrella under which four companies reside, offering motivational speaking and other services on sales, marketing, divorce and cancer.

== Books ==
Clifford has written eight books. Five books have been about her battle with cancer, humorous portrayals of what she went through while she was sick. Her first book was Not Now…I'm Having A No Hair Day! published in 1995, followed by Our Family Has Cancer, Too! in 1998 and by Cancer Has Its Privileges: Stories of Hope & Laughter in 2002. In 2005, she wrote Your Guardian Angel’s Gift and her latest book on cancer was Laugh 'Til It Heals: Notes from the World's Funniest Cancer Mailbox, which she wrote in 2011.

In 2007, Clifford published YOU, Inc. The Art of Selling Yourself. The book received positive reviews. The book is written in bite-sized chunks and contains 160+ lessons on various topics. The Time wrote about the book that, "You’ll want to keep this guide within easy reach on the desk, the credenza, or next to the bed" and BlogCritics wrote that "If you buy it, I'll bet you'll read it more than once, too." Her latest book, Let's Close a Deal! Turn Contacts into Paying Customers for Your Company, Product, Service or Cause was released by Wiley & Sons in 2013.

Clifford has also written a book about divorce, titled The Clue Phone's Ringing...It's for You! Healing Humor for Women Divorcing, which was published in 2011. She wrote the book after she ended her second marriage. She was a contributing author to Chicken Soup for the Survivor's Soul, Chicken Soup for the Golfer's Soul and Chicken Soup for the Writer's Soul.

== Awards and honors ==
- In July 2002, Christine was awarded The Order of the Delta Gamma Rose from the Delta Gamma fraternity.

== Bibliography ==
- Not Now I'm Having A No Hair Day! (1996). University Of Minnesota Press. ISBN 978-0816643158
- Our Family Has Cancer, Too! (1998). University Of Minnesota Press. ISBN 978-0816641864
- Inspiring Breakthrough Secrets to Live Your Dreams (2001). Aviva Publishing.
- Cancer Has Its Privileges: Stories of Hope and Laughter (2002). Penguin Putnam/Perigee. ISBN 978-0399527760
- Your Guardian Angel's Gift (2005). Bronze Bow. ISBN 978-1932458305
- You, Inc.: The Art of Selling Yourself (2007). Grand Central Publishing. ISBN 978-0446695817
- The Clue Phone's Ringing...It's for You! Healing Humor for Women Divorcing (2011). Anshan. ISBN 978-1848290655
- Laugh 'Til It Heals: Notes from the World's Funniest Cancer Mailbox (2011). Anshan. ISBN 978-1848290662
- Let's Close a Deal: Turn Contacts into Paying Customers for Your Company, Product, Service or Cause (2013) ISBN 978-1118521557
- Your Guardian Angel's Gift (2017) ISBN 978-1944833152
