= Betsy Martin =

American journalist (born 1970)

Betsy Fischer Martin
- Born: Elizabeth Scott Fischer; February 17, 1970 (age 56); New Orleans
- Education: American University (BA, MA)
- Spouse: Jonathan Martin
- Children: 1
- Parent(s): Sally F. Pomeroy; Rev. George J. Fischer
- Website: www.american.edu/spa/faculty/fischerm.cfm

Betsy Fischer Martin (born February 17, 1970) is an American Emmy-winning journalist and former TV news executive at NBC's “Meet the Press,” the longest-running program in television history. She is currently the director of the Institute of Politics at Harvard Kennedy School. Martin is also a Fellow in the Center for Congressional and Presidential Studies at American University. She is a member of the International Advisory Council of APCO Worldwide and she is the founder, and principal, of her own consulting business, Fischer Martin Media, where she specializes in offering media training to corporate executives.

== Early life and education ==
Elizabeth Scott Fischer was born in New Orleans, Louisiana, United States, on February 17, 1970. Her mother, Sally F. Pomeroy, was a member of the New Orleans Opera Chorus and retired as a piano and voice teacher in Metairie, Louisiana. Her father, Rev. George J. Fischer, retired as the pastor of First Union Presbyterian Church in Luling, Louisiana.

She attended Grace King High School, a public high school located in Metairie, Louisiana, which she graduated from in 1988. Martin then received a bachelor's degree in justice in 1992 and a master's degree in journalism and public affairs in 1996, both from American University. While at American, she was also a research assistant at the Center for Congressional and Presidential Studies.

== Career ==
Martin began her career by interning in 1991 at NBC's Political/Polling Unit and “Meet the Press,” in Washington D.C. Within this department at NBC from 1991 to 2002 she moved through the ranks achieving the positions of Researcher, Associate Producer, Producer, and Senior Producer with “Meet the Press.”

She worked closely for 17 years with her mentor, Tim Russert, producing his interviews on “Meet the Press” as well as producing NBC's elections coverage, including four presidential elections every presidential election from 1992 to 2004. This coverage included the primaries, party conventions, debates, and election night broadcasts.

In 2002, she became the Executive Producer of “Meet the Press,” a position that she held for 11 years. During this time, she oversaw all editorial content, guest-selection, strategic planning, production, marketing, special online programming, and financial decision-making for the program. In total, she was the Executive Producer of more than 600 live national broadcasts of “Meet the Press.” In 2008, she produced NBC's coverage of the presidential election for Tom Brokaw, including party conventions, debates, and election night, as well as one of the three general election debates between McCain and Obama, which he moderated. She was also the Anchor Producer for David Gregory for NBC's Special coverage of the 2012 presidential election.

Later, from 2013 to 2014, she was the Managing Editor of Political Programming at NBC News. In this position she was responsible for the development and execution of network political coverage at NBC News. After 23 years, Martin left NBC News in 2014.

Until 2016 was a Contributing Editor for Washington MORE Magazine where she interviewed female political leaders, including Condoleezza Rice, Nikki Haley, and Samantha Power about policy issues, women's empowerment and leadership skills. She later served as a contributor for Bloomberg Politics, co-hosting Bloomberg News’ “Masters in Politics” Podcast. This political podcast featured interviews and discussions with presidential candidates, government officials, and key strategists.

In 2018, Martin was appointed as the executive director of the Women and Politics Institute at American University, in addition to teaching courses on political communication. She was a fellow at the USC Center for the Political Future in 2025.

Martin was named the director of the Harvard Institute of Politics on June 29, 2026, following the death of Setti Warren.

== Personal life ==
In 2012, Martin married political journalist Jonathan Martin. She has one daughter from her previous marriage, and lives with her husband in Falls Church, Virginia.

== Published works ==
- 2018 – Tim Russert: Loss and Lessons a Decade Later, From NBC News
- 2016 – “Masters in Politics” Podcast, Bloomberg News
- 2016 – Klobuchar Says She's Unsure Clinton Would Stick With Garland for Court, From Bloomberg News
- 2016 – Carson Says Trump Doesn't Need to Apologize for Putin Praise
- 2016 – RNC's Spicer Says Trump Can Drain the Swamp with Establishment Help, From Bloomberg News
- 2015 – “TRIAL TALK” Podcast
- 2013 – Remembering Tim Russert, From NBC News

== Honours, decorations, awards and distinctions ==
- 2017 – Women and Politics Institute, Alice Paul Award, Alumna Recipient
- 2017 – National Press Club, President's Award
- 2012 – Emmy Award Winner, National Capital Region
- 2008 – Emmy Award Winner, National Television Academy
- 2008 – Young Global Leader, World Economic Forum
- 2005 – Emmy Award Winner, National Television Academy
- 2005 – Wilbur Award, Religion Communicators Council
- 2006 – Emmy Nomination, National Television Academy
- 2004 – Gracie Award, American Women in Radio and Television
- 2004 – USC Annenberg/Walter Cronkite Award for Excellence in Political Journalism
- 2002 – USC Annenberg/Walter Cronkite Award for Excellence in Political Journalism
- 2000 – USC Annenberg/Walter Cronkite Award for Excellence in Political Journalism
- 1997 – Emmy Nomination, National Television Academy
