= Laura Langbein =

Political scientist

- Born: c. 1945 (age c. 79)
- Education: Oberlin College (BA); University of North Carolina at Chapel Hill (PhD)

Laura Irwin Langbein (born c. 1945) is a quantitative methodologist and professor of public administration and policy at American University in Washington, D.C. She teaches quantitative methods, program evaluation, policy analysis, and public choice. Her articles have appeared in journals on politics, economics, policy analysis and public administration.

Langbein received a BA in government from Oberlin College in 1965 and a PhD in political science from the University of North Carolina at Chapel Hill in 1972. She has taught at American University since 1973: until 1978 as an assistant professor in the School of Government and Public Administration; from 1978 to 1983 as an associate professor in the School of Government and Public Administration; and since 1983 as a professor in the School of Public Affairs. She is also a private consultant on statistics, research design, survey research, and program evaluation and an accomplished clarinetist.

In August 2010, her article in International Public Management Journal received a best paper award and her Social Science Quarterly article on same-sex marriage, co-authored by Mark Yost, was cited in the Proposition 8 decision by a U.S. District Court in San Francisco, California.

== Selected published works ==
- Langbein, Laura; Jorstad, Connie (2004). "Productivity in the Workplace: Cops, Collusion, Communication, and Cooperation". Political Research Quarterly. 57 (1): 65–79. doi:10.1177/106591290405700106. S2CID 153512070.
- Langbein, Laura; Spotswood-Bright, Kim (2005). "Accountability and Private Governments" (PDF). Regulation Magazine.
- Langbein, Laura (2005). "Public School Music: Notes on the Public Provision of a Quasi-Private Good". Public Choice. 121 (1–2): 83–98. doi:10.1007/s11127-004-6160-3. JSTOR 30026513. S2CID 153682752.
- Langbein, Laura (2008). "Management by Results: Student Evaluation of Faculty Teaching and the Mismeasurement of Performance" (PDF). Economics of Education Review. 27 (4): 417–428. doi:10.1016/j.econedurev.2006.12.003.
- Langbein, Laura; Knack, Stephen (2008). "The World Governance Indicators and Tautology: Causally Related Separable Concepts, Indicators of a Common Cause, or Both?" (PDF). Policy Research Working Papers. World Bank Development Research Group. doi:10.1596/1813-9450-4669. hdl:10986/6839. S2CID 73629154. Policy Research Working Paper WPS4669.
- Langbein, Laura (2009). "Beyond Random Assignment for Internal Validity and Beyond Social Research for Random Assignment". Journal of Policy Analysis and Management. 28 (1): 173–174. doi:10.1002/pam.20412. Invited Comment: Point and Counterpoint on the Role of Random Assignment in Social Policy Research.
- Langbein, Laura (2009). "Controlling Federal Agencies: The Impact of External Controls on Worker Discretion and Productivity" (PDF). International Public Management Journal. 12 (1): 82–115. doi:10.1080/10967490802649551. S2CID 153454405.
- Langbein, Laura; Yost, Mark A. (2009). "Same-Sex Marriage and Negative Externalities". Social Science Quarterly. 90 (2): 292–309. doi:10.1111/j.1540-6237.2009.00618.x.
- Langbein, Laura; Cowell-Meyers, Kimberly (2009). "Linking Women's Descriptive and Substantive Representation in the American States". Politics and Gender. 5 (4): 491–518. doi:10.1017/s1743923x09990328. S2CID 145587732.
- Langbein, Laura; Knack, Stephen (2010). "The World Governance Indicators: Six, One, or None?". Journal of Development Studies. 46 (2): 350–370. doi:10.1080/00220380902952399. hdl:10986/4661. S2CID 153596987.
- Langbein, Laura (2010). "Economics, Public Service Motivation and Pay for Performance: Complements or Substitutes?". International Public Management Journal. 13 (1): 1–15. doi:10.1080/10967490903547134. S2CID 154785659.
- Langbein, Laura (2012). Public Program Evaluation: A Statistical Guide 2nd Ed. M.E. Sharpe. ISBN 978-0-7656-2612-7.
