= John Della Volpe =

American pollster and writer

John Della Volpe is an American pollster, author, and advisor to Joe Biden's 2020 election campaign. He is the director of polling at the Harvard Kennedy School Institute of Politics and the founder of Cambridge's SocialSphere, a public opinion research firm focusing on Gen Z and Millennials. Della Volpe is also an MSNBC contributor.

== Polling ==
Della Volpe has conducted focus groups with Millennials and Gen Z voters.

=== Millennials ===
Della Volpe pinned Obama's drop in support among Millennials in polls in 2013 to unmet expectations and passion. In 2015, Della Volpe described Millennials as "a more cynical generation when it comes to political institutions."

=== Gen Z ===
Della Volpe has been called the "Gen Z whisperer." His book "Fight," published in January 2022, details the defining political issues of American Generation Z voters, as well as comparing the cohort to their Millennial counterparts. Della Volpe said Zoomers were distinct in a few ways from previous generations, notably a lack of political optimism for the future of America, a rise in anxiety and other mental health issues, and the group's then-nearly 2 to 1 support for Democrats over Republicans.

== Book ==
In January 2022, with St. Martin's, Della Volpe published his first book, FIGHT: How Gen Z is Channelling Their Fear and Passion to Save America. Publishers Weekly called it "the rare sociological study that manages to inspire," and it was an Amazon Editor's Pick in Non-Fiction.

== Biden advising role ==
John Della Volpe met Joe Biden in 2018. Della Volpe temporarily left the Harvard Institute of Politics to advise Joe Biden on his 2020 campaign run.

According to Politico, Della Volpe said executive actions from Biden on "student debt, mental health, climate change" and the cost-of-living crisis would resonate among young voters ahead of the 2022 midterm elections.

Della Volpe warned about Zoomers' low enthusiasm for the president and the Democratic Party label, saying, "These voters gotta buy into the values of the party and the candidates … and to appreciate the fact that politics can make a difference. You can’t do that in a full-week ad buy after Labor Day."

== Speaking with American Men (SAM) project ==
John Della Volpe cofounded SAM following the 2024 election to study Democrats' losses with young men. The project also was founded by Texas 2024 Senate candidate Colin Alred and former NARAL president Ilsye Hogue.

Della Volpe commented in 2025 that the young male vote was not "lost" but that Democrats were "losing it right now." On a RealClearPolitics podcast, Della Volpe said young men were telling him that unaffordable housing was the most dominant issue and they felt that Democrats focused too much on celebrity endorsements.
