= Karen O'Connor (professor) =

American political scientist

- Born: February 15, 1952 (age 74); Buffalo
- Education: SUNY-Buffalo
- Occupation: Political scientist

Karen Paula O'Connor (born February 15, 1952) is the Jonathan N. Helfat Distinguished Professor of Political Science and a Distinguished Professor of Government at American University in Washington, D.C., where she is also the Founder and Director Emerita of the Women & Politics Institute.

She served as chair of the Department of Government at American University from 1997-2000. She also served as the editor of Women & Politics for 7 years and has been a member of its editorial board since 1980 under its new name, the Journal of Women, Politics & Policy. She has also served on the editorial boards of numerous political science journals.

O'Connor earned her B.A. from State University College at Buffalo (1973) and her J.D., and Ph. D. degrees from SUNY-Buffalo where she was the Baldy Fellow in Law and Social Policy. She taught at Emory University from 1977 until moving to American University in 1995 where she served as chair of the Department of Government from 1997 - 2000.

== Publications ==
O'Connor has written, co-authored, or edited several books, including American Government: Continuity and Change, 15ed. (2019) and Women, Politics and American Society, 5thed. (2012), Women in Congress: Running, Winning and Ruling (2002), and No Neutral Ground: Abortion Politics in an Age of Absolutes (1996). She has published numerous monographs, book chapters, and articles in the leading social science and political science journals and law reviews. She is also an active member of the American Political Science Association and served on its Executive Council, the past chair of the Law and Courts section of the APSA and the Organized Research Section on Women and Politics, the past president of the Women's Caucus for Political Science, Southern Political Science Association and the National Capital Area Political Science Association.

In June 2005, O'Connor testified before the Senate Judiciary Committee on the effect of Roe v. Wade.
