= MJ Lee =

American journalist

- Born: Lee Min-jung; March 5, 1987 (age 39); Seoul, South Korea
- Other name: Min Jung Lee
- Citizenship: United States
- Education: Georgetown University
- Occupations: Journalist, political correspondent
- Years active: 2009 – present
- Employer(s): CNN (2014–present); Politico (2009–2014)
- Known for: CNN White House Correspondent
- Spouse: Alex Burns
- Children: 2

Korean name
- Hangul: 이민정
- Hanja: 李珉廷
- RR: I Minjeong
- MR: I Minjŏng

Min Jung "MJ" Lee (born March 5, 1987) is a South Korean-born American political correspondent for CNN and is currently a White House correspondent for the network.

She has previously worked for Politico.

== Early life and education ==
Lee was born in Seoul, South Korea and raised in Hong Kong, where she and her brother attended Hong Kong International School (an American-system style school). In her junior year of high school, she moved to the United States to attend a boarding school and has never returned to South Korea since. In 2009, she graduated from Georgetown University with a degree in government and Chinese. During college, she interned for The Washington Post and South China Morning Post. Lee was offered an entry-level journalism position, but was then rejected due to being on a visa.

== Career ==
Months after graduation, Lee began working at Politico as a web producer. By 2012, she was a finance reporter after a year on the breaking news desk. In 2014, she started working at CNN. Since working at CNN, she has covered the 2016 United States presidential election (both Trump and Clinton campaigns); as well as how the Me Too movement has affected Capitol Hill, covering the allegations against ousted U.S. Senator Al Franken (D-MN), former White House aide and Staff Secretary Rob Porter, and former U.S. Representative Blake Farenthold (R-TX) (all of whom resigned from their positions as a result of abuse or sexual misconduct allegations). She has also covered the Republicans' contemporary attempts to repeal the Affordable Care Act. Lee covered the 2020 Democratic presidential primary with a focus on the Elizabeth Warren campaign, and the 2020 United States presidential election with a focus on the Joe Biden campaign.

In January 2021, Lee was promoted to White House correspondent under the Biden administration.

At APEC United States 2023, she asked US president Joe Biden if he considered General Secretary of the Chinese Communist Party Xi Jinping a dictator. Biden replied yes.

== Personal life ==
Lee became an American citizen on September 17, 2016, on Ellis Island, coinciding with her coverage of the 2016 US presidential election campaign. She is married to fellow journalist Alex Burns. They have two children.

In 2022, Lee was named by Carnegie Corporation of New York as an honoree of the Great Immigrants Awards.
