= William M. LeoGrande =

American academic

William M. LeoGrande is a professor of government and former dean of the American University School of Public Affairs. He is an expert on Latin America.

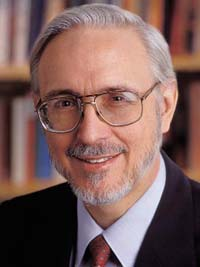
Dean William H. LeoGrande

== Biography ==
Dean of the American University School of Public Affairs and a specialist in Latin American politics and U.S. foreign policy toward Latin America, LeoGrande has been a frequent adviser to government and private sector agencies.

He has written five books, the latest of which is Our Own Backyard: The United States in Central America, 1977 – 1992. Previously, he served on the staffs of the Democratic Policy Committee of the United States Senate, and the Democratic Caucus Task Force on Central America of the United States House of Representatives.

LeoGrande has been a Council on Foreign Relations International Affairs Fellow, and a Pew Faculty Fellow in International Affairs. His articles have appeared in Foreign Affairs, Foreign Policy, American Political Science Review, Latin American Research Review, The New Republic, The New York Times, the Los Angeles Times, The Miami Herald, and other journals and newspapers.

LeoGrande was acting dean of the School of Public Affairs from 1997 to 1999 before assuming the position as dean, which he left in 2011.

== Education ==
LeoGrande holds a B.A., an M.A., and a Ph.D., all from the Maxwell School of Citizenship and Public Affairs of Syracuse University.

== Selected publications ==
- "Tug of War: How Real Is the Rivalry Between Congress and the President Over Foreign Policy?" Congress and the Presidency 29:113-118. 2002.
- "Cuba's Quest for Economic Independence." Journal of Latin American Studies 34:325-363. 2002.
- "América Central: Una década de democracia." Foreign Affairs en Español 2:3-10. 2001.
- "Cuba: The Shape of Things to Come." In Cuba: Contours of Change., ed. Susan Kaufman Purcell and David Rothkopf. Boulder, CO: Lynne Rienner. 2000.
- "Conclusion: Cuba's Dilemma and Ours." In Cuba: Contours of Change., ed. Susan Kaufman Purcell and David Rothkopf. Boulder, CO: Lynne Rienner. 2000.
- Our Own Backyard: The United States in Central America, 1977–1993. Chapel Hill, NC: University of North Carolina Press. 1998.
- LeoGrande, William M., Louis Goodman and Johanna Mendelson. 1992. Political Parties in Central America. Boulder, CO: Westview.
- LeoGrande, William M.., Philip Brenner, Daniel Siegel, and Donna Rich. 1988. The Cuba Reader: The Making of a Revolutionary Society. New York, NY: Grove Press.
- LeoGrande, William M., Morris Blachman and Kenneth Sharpe. 1986. Confronting Revolution: Security Through Diplomacy in Central America. New York, NY: Pantheon Books.

== Additional information ==
- Curriculum Vitae
- United Nations Articles
