= The Unexpected Spy =

Memoir of Tracy Walder

The Unexpected Spy: From the CIA to the FBI, My Secret Life Taking Down Some of the World's Most Notorious Terrorists
- First edition
- Author: Tracy Walder
- Language: English
- Genre: Memoir
- Publisher: St. Martin's Press
- Publication date: 2019

The Unexpected Spy: From the CIA to the FBI, My Secret Life Taking Down Some of the World's Most Notorious Terrorists is a 2019 memoir by Tracy Walder about her work in the Central Intelligence Agency (CIA) and the Federal Bureau of Investigation (FBI). Jessica Anya Blau assisted with the book, published by St. Martin's Press.

Jeff Rowe of the Associated Press (AP) stated that the book "is more a diary of the author’s journey" instead of "an exploration of decision-making at the highest levels of government".

== Background ==
The author, born Tracy Schandler, grew up in the Van Nuys neighborhood of Los Angeles. An alumna of University of Southern California and a member of the Delta Gamma sorority, first decided to work for the CIA when she encountered a CIA recruiting table at USC in 2000. She previously initially planned to be a history teacher. She printed out her resume and gave a copy to the staffer at the booth.

She worked for both the CIA and FBI, with her book showing a preference for employment at the former. In the CIA she entered the Weapons of Mass Destruction office and gained the post of "staff operations officer". Her task was to manage the Al Qaeda threat. She enjoyed her work but decided she did not want to do as much travel anymore.

In May 2004 she began working for the FBI after leaving the CIA, and she was employed by the agency for 15 months. There she worked on the Chi Mak counter-intelligence case. She stated that sexism was an issue at the FBI, and while she believed it would go away when she was promoted to higher levels, it continued to affect her; she stated that sexism was not as much of an issue at the CIA.

She left the FBI circa July 2005, and she taught history at the Hockaday School in Dallas, at the high school level. By 2020 she planned to end her time teaching and had joined the board of the organization Girl Security. She married a man and had a child with him.

Blau is a novelist. She stated in an interview with Zac Crain of D Magazine that Walder is "obviously brilliant, but she doesn’t have a sense of what about her is interesting".

== Contents ==
Publishers Weekly stated that the book has "rapid prose".

The book shows paragraphs and sentences that are blacked over as Walder had to have her book reviewed by the CIA before publishing. Kirkus Reviews wrote that, including in regard to the Iraq War, the author "fiercely defends the CIA". Rowe also described her as "a CIA loyalist". She defended the CIA's role in regard to the 9/11 Commission Report and torture in the George W. Bush administration.

== Reception ==
Publishers Weekly gave the book a star, and stated that the book is "fast-paced and intense".

Kirkus describes it as "A mostly breezy read through some undeniably challenging and threatening circumstances."

Rowe stated that "some insight into how the two agencies communicate would have been illuminating."

== Adaptations ==
As of 2020 there were plans for a television series for ABC. Ellen Pompeo had purchased the story rights.
