= American University School of Public Affairs =

Institution of higher education and research in Washington, D.C.

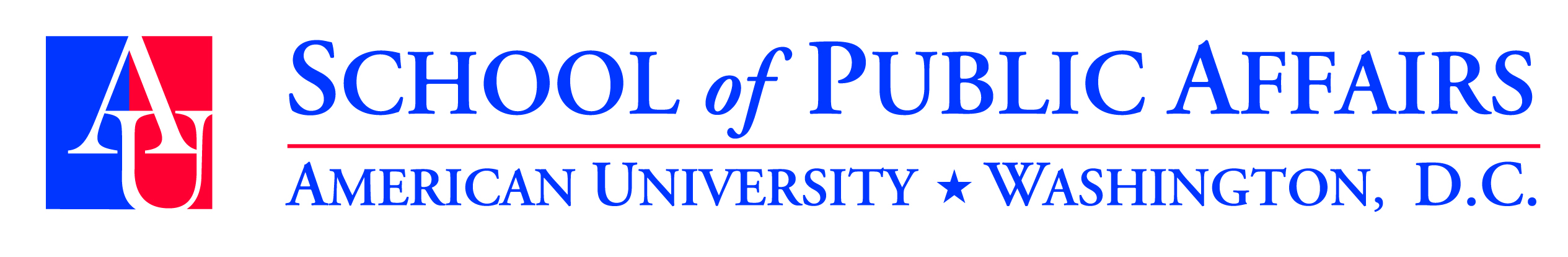
- Type: Private
- Established: 1934
- Parent institution: American University
- Academic affiliations: TPC
- Dean: Alison Jacknowitz
- Academic staff: 111
- Students: 1,984 (undergraduate); 980 (postgrad); 66 (doctoral)
- Location: Washington, D.C., United States; 38°56′15″N 77°5′13″W
- Campus: Urban
- Website: www.american.edu/spa/

The American University School of Public Affairs (SPA) is an institution of higher education and research located in Washington, D.C. that grants academic degrees in political science, public administration, public policy, and justice, law, and criminology. Established in 1934 as part of American University, the school houses three academic departments - Public Administration & Policy, Government, and Justice, Law, Criminology & Security - as well as ten centers and institutes.

== History ==
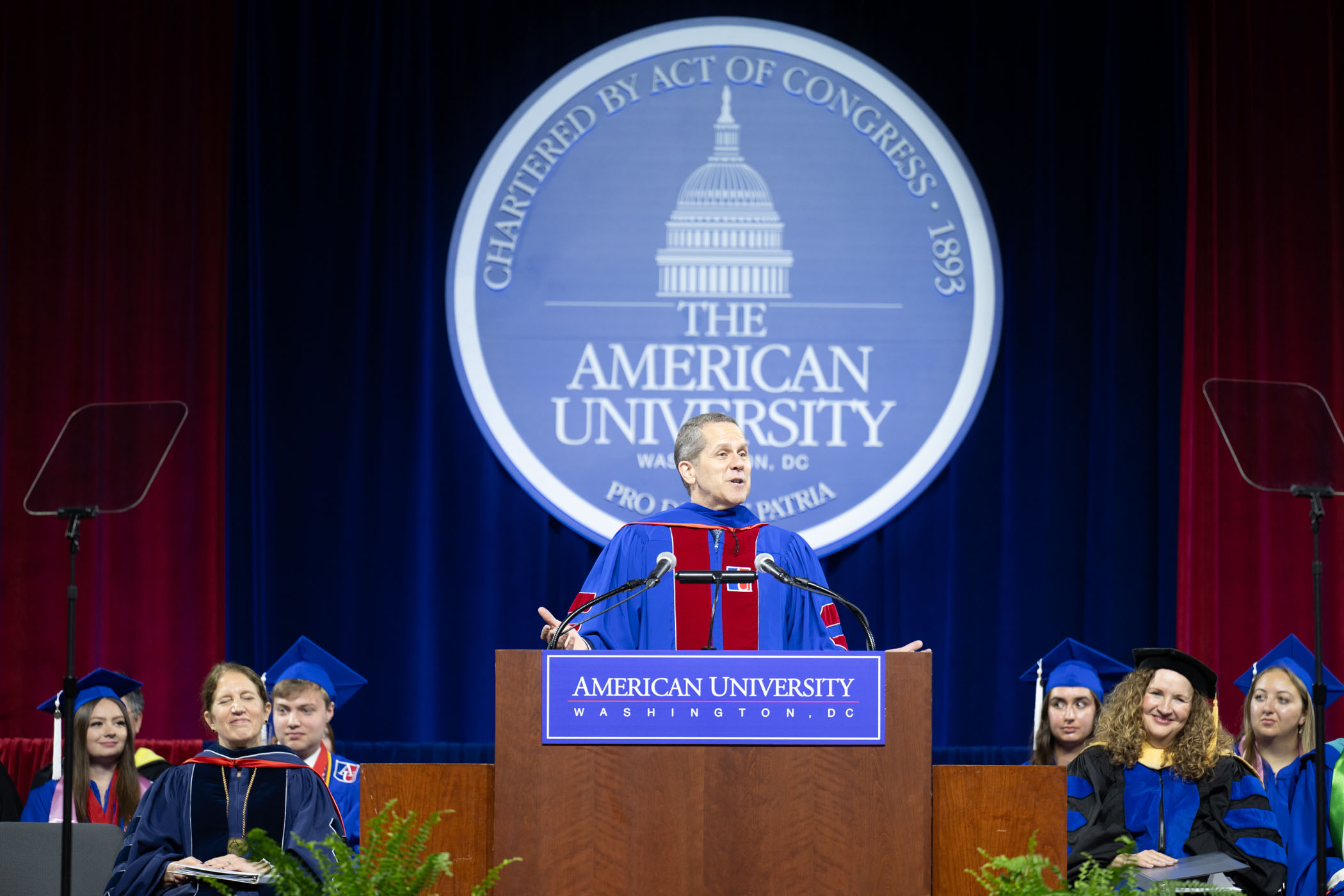
US Federal Reserve Vice Chair for Supervision Michael Barr speaks at the American University School of Public Affairs graduation ceremony in 2024

The School of Public Affairs was created on March 3, 1934 with a $4,000 grant from the Rockefeller Foundation to provide training to 80 promising young federal government employees in downtown Washington, D.C. By 1937, its enrollment had grown to more than 1,000 students, and it had expanded its mission to include undergraduate and graduate degrees.

SPA's institutional role shifted several times over the next twenty years. In 1957, it was renamed the School of Government and Public Administration, and in 1973, it was combined with the existing Schools of Justice and International Service to become the College of Public and International Affairs. In 1988, the School of International Service was recreated as a freestanding school, and the College of Public and International Affairs was once again the School of Public Affairs.

The dean's office, department offices, and most faculty are located in Kerwin Hall. The executive education programs occupy the Watkins building, and some faculty and staff have offices in Hurst Hall.

== Department of Public Administration and Policy ==
The Department of Public Administration & Policy (DPAP) is home to 32 full-time faculty members and enrolls about 65% of SPA's graduate students.

=== Degree programs ===
- Master of Public Administration
- Master of Public Administration and Policy (Online)
- Key Executive Master of Public Administration
- Master of Public Policy
- Master of Science in Organization Development
- Ph.D. in Public Administration and Policy

The MPA, Key Executive MPA, and MPP are accredited by the Network of Schools of Public Policy, Affairs, and Administration. The school is also an institutional member of the Association for Public Policy Analysis and Management.

=== Research centers ===
- Center for Environmental Policy
- Center for Public Finance Research
- Institute for the Study of Public Policy Implementation
- Metropolitan Policy Center

=== Recognition ===
DPAP's programs are routinely recognized by U.S. News & World Report as being among the top 20 in the country. In the 2020 ranking of graduate schools of public affairs, the department's masters programs are ranked 13th.

=== Notable faculty ===
- Cornelius Kerwin, former president of American University
- Laura Langbein, quantitative methodologist and author of Public Program Evaluation: A Statistical Guide
- Howard E. McCurdy, space policy expert and author of Space and the American Imagination
- Kenneth J. Meier, founder of the Journal of Behavioral Public Administration and an expert on the political economy of regulatory agencies
- Barbara S. Romzek, expert on public management, accountability, and government reform
- David H. Rosenbloom, expert on administrative law and the National Partnership for Reinventing Government

== Department of Government ==
The Department of Government is home to 40 full-time faculty members and focuses primarily on offering undergraduate political science courses to its nearly 1,500 major students. It also serves more than 110 graduate students.

=== Degree programs ===
- Bachelors of Arts in Political Science; Communication, Legal Institutions, Economics, and Government (CLEG);

Justice and Law; Legal Studies

- Master of Arts in Political Science
- Master of Arts in Political Communication
- Master of Science in Data Science
- Ph.D. in Political Science

=== Research centers ===
- Center for Congressional and Presidential Studies
- Center for Data Science
- Political Theory Institute
- Women & Politics Institute
- First Ladies Initiative
- Peace & Violence Research Lab
- Washington Institute for Public Affairs Research
- Analytics and Management Institute
- Project on Civil Discourse

=== Recognition ===
U.S. News & World Report ranks the Department of Government at #56 in the field of political science. The National Research Council ranks the department among the top 100 programs in the United States.

=== Notable faculty ===
- William M. LeoGrande, professor, co-author of "Back Channel to Cuba: The Hidden History of Negotiations between Washington and Havana"
- David Lublin, marriage equality advocate and town mayor of Chevy Chase, Maryland
- Jennifer Lawless, former candidate for office and current manager of Women and Politics Institute
- Anita McBride, former chief of staff to the First Lady of the United States and coauthor of Remember the First Ladies
- Connie Morella, former U.S. representative from Maryland's 8th District
- Karen O'Connor, author of best-selling introductory American government text American Government: Roots and Reform
- James A. Thurber, author of Obama in Office and campaign management specialist

== Department of Justice, Law, & Criminology ==
The Department of Justice, Law & Criminology is home to 27 full-time faculty, more than 450 undergraduates, and approximately 230 graduate students. JLC is home to AU's mock trial team, which has become a nationally competitive squad under the guidance of head coach Mike Romano.

=== Degree programs ===
- Undergraduate majors in Justice and Law & Society
- M.S. in Justice, Law, & Criminology
- M.S. in Terrorism and Homeland Security Policy
- Ph.D. in Justice, Law & Criminology

=== Research centers ===
- Justice Programs Office
- Wrongful Convictions Project
