= Texa =

Island in Scotland

Teugsa (Gaelic)
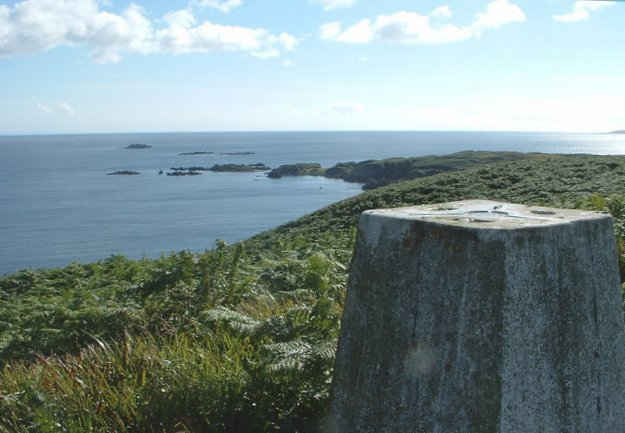
- Ceann Garbh, the summit of the island

Location
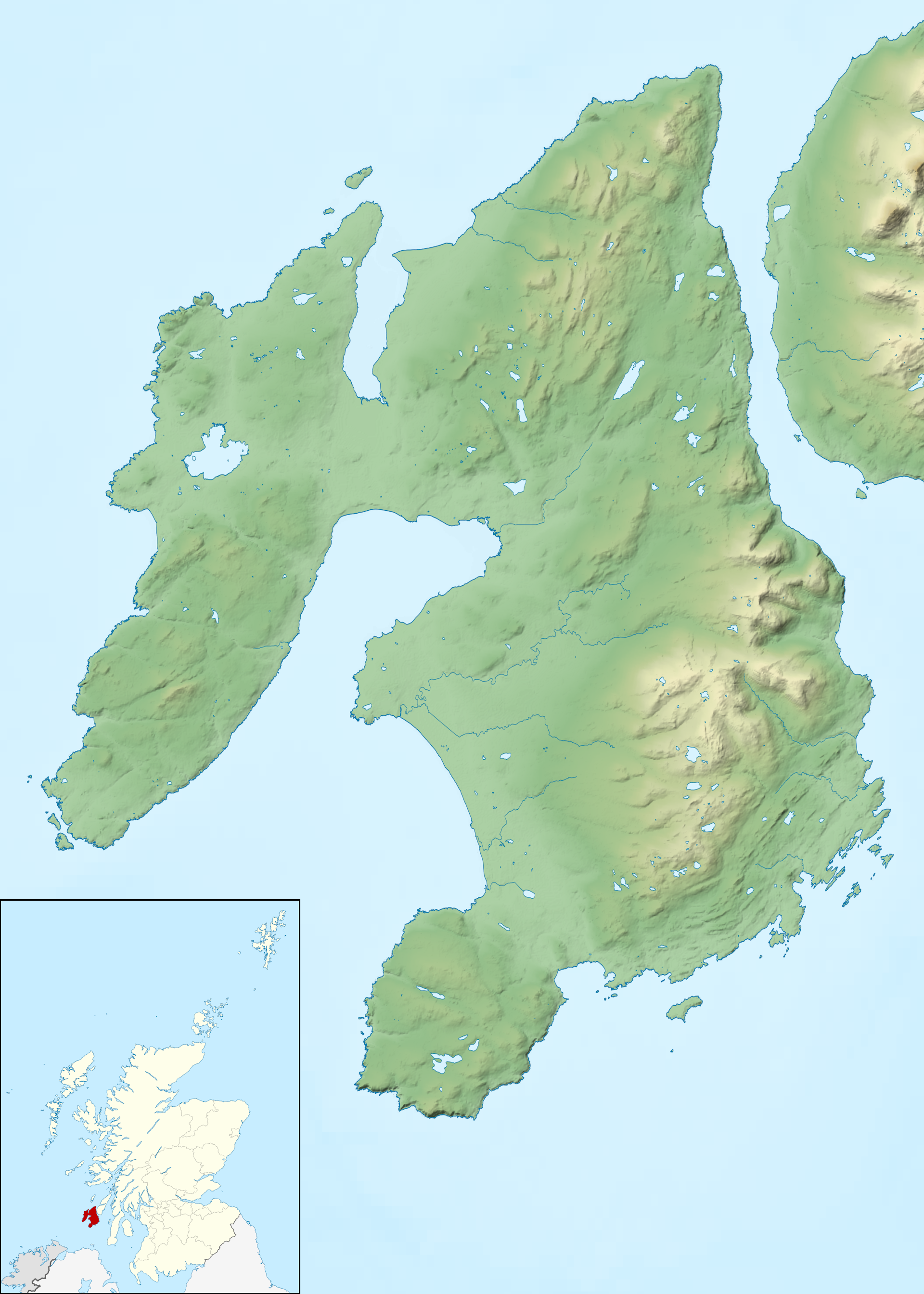
- Texa shown next to Islay Texa shown within Argyll and Bute
- OS grid reference: NR392437
- Coordinates: 55.61°N 6.14°W

Name
- Gaelic pronunciation: "CHAYK-sa"

Physical geography
- Island group: Islay
- Area: 48 ha (1/8 sq mi)
- Area rank: 207
- Highest elevation: Ceann Garbh, 48 m (157 ft)

Administration
- Council area: Argyll and Bute
- Country: Scotland
- Sovereign state: United Kingdom

Demographics
- Population: 0

Texa (Scottish Gaelic: Teugsa) is a small island 700 metres (3/8 mile) directly south of Islay, in the Inner Hebrides, Scotland. It reaches a height of 48 metres (157 feet) at its highest point, Ceann Garbh. It is part of the parish of Kildalton, in the council area of Argyll and Bute. The distilleries of Laphroaig and Lagavulin are nearby on the Islay coast, as well as Port Ellen. It is currently uninhabited, but is home to wild goats, as well as otters.

== Geology ==
The island has its own fresh water supply at Tobar Moireig. The rock is mainly schist and some hornblende.

== History ==
=== Church history ===
Texa has tentatively been identified as the Oidecha Insula written about by St Adomnan. The etymology of the name is disputed – it may represent either the Old Irish tech (house – taigh in modern Scottish Gaelic) or Oideachd/Oideachas, a word for a religious seminary.

Adomnan mentions that St Cainneach (Kenneth) used "Oidecha Insula" as a stopping place on his journey between Iona and Ireland. Kenneth is said to have left his crozier on Iona on this journey, so St Columba blessed it, cast it into the sea, and it washed up on Oidecha where Kenneth found it.

Whether or not Texa is Oidecha Insula, the island was, like many others round the Scottish coast, used as an ecclesiastical settlement, and the remains of a chapel dedicated to the Virgin Mary can still be seen. This was built, probably on the site of an older one, in the late 14th century by Raghnall/Reginald of Islay, son of Iain/John. This is commemorated today in the name Bàgh na h-Eaglais (Church Bay) and Tobar Moireig ([sic] Mary’s Well), which lies next to the anchorage. There are also many caves on the island, in which anchorites could live.

The shaft of a cross stood east of the chapel, commemorating Raghnall. It is now in a museum in Edinburgh.

=== Miscellaneous ===
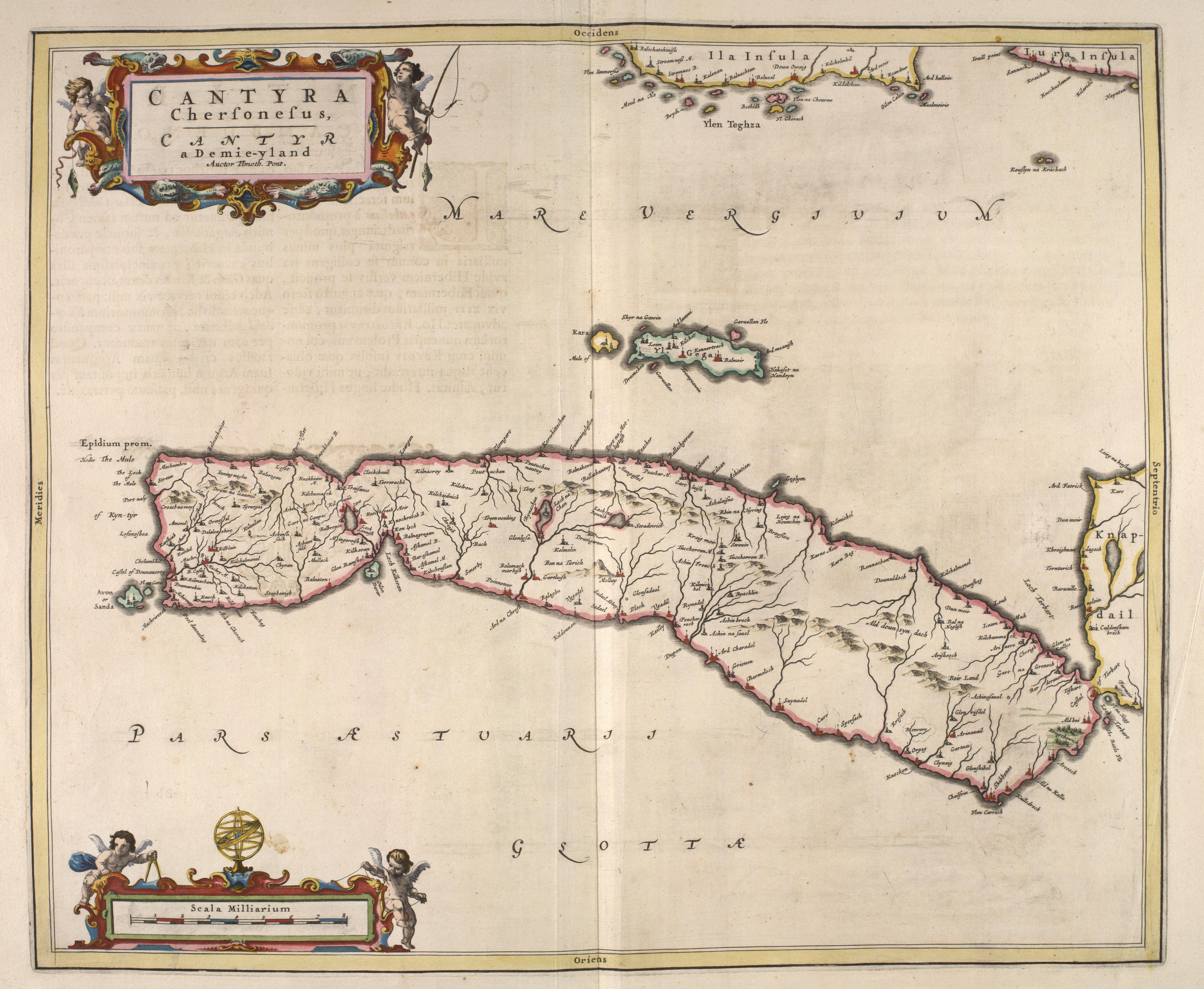
Blaeu's 1654 Atlas with "Ylen Teghza" near the top. The map is oriented with west at the top.

In the 13th century, the Norse fleet of Somerled anchored near to Texa. Islay was one of the centres of Norse culture in the Hebrides.

The island's name has been recorded in a number of variants. In 1385, John of Fordun refers to Texa as "Helan ttexa" ("eilean" being an island in Gaelic). In 1549, Dean Monro wrote of "Tisgay" that it was: "callit by the Erische Tisgay, ane myle of lenthe guid maineland, and ane kirk in it; very guid it is for sheep and for fishing."

In 1614, it was referred to in a document as "Ilantasson", and was chartered by the crown to Sir John Campbell of Cawdor, confirmed by a Scottish Act of Parliament in 1626. In 1608, Andrew Knox, bishop of the Isles, wrote from "Ilintexa". In 1625, Father Cornelius Ward, a Franciscan missionary reported that there were twenty nine people living on the island, and most of them were Roman Catholic. (The island was inhabited until the early 19th century.) The six who were not Catholic, he converted. Johan Blaeu's 1654 Atlas records Texa as "Ylen Teghza".

In 1741, the island was referred to by a marriage contract between Jane and Susan.

The Statistical Account, written more than a century and a half later, records that:

There is good pasture on this small island; and there is a burying-place around the chapel the walls of which are partly standing. There are the remains of other 2 or 3 chapels in this parish, where they were formerly wont to bury those who were of the popish religion; but the whole inhabitants of this parish now belong to the Established Church.

== See also ==
- List of islands of Scotland
