= Women & Politics Institute =

Research institute focused on the gender gap in political leadership

- Abbreviation: WPI
- Formation: January 1, 2000; 26 years ago
- Founder: Karen O'Connor
- Purpose: Research institute
- Headquarters: American University School of Public Affairs
- Location: Washington, D.C.
- Director: Betsy Fischer Martin
- Parent organization: American University School of Public Affairs
- Website: www.american.edu/spa/wpi/

The Women & Politics Institute (WPI) is a research institute located in the School of Public Affairs at American University in Washington, D.C. Their mission is to close the gender gap in political leadership. The institute provides young women with academic and practical training that encourages them to become involved in the political process. It facilitates research to enhance the understanding of the challenges women face in the political arena.

== Description ==
Founded in 2000 by Karen O'Connor, the institute offers graduate, undergraduate, and non-degree certificates in "Women, Policy, and Political Leadership." The WPPL programs offer graduates in-depth theoretical knowledge on women and politics, as well as the opportunity to learn to evaluate current issues with leading practitioners and experts. Students in the WPPL programs gain research experience, build professional networks, develop their leadership skills, and advance their careers.

WPI also offers one leadership training program: WeLead. The nonpartisan WeLead training program successfully positions young professional women to run for office or lead a political campaign through an intensive series of workshops and seminars. It prepares women to seek, obtain, and succeed in political positions in the White House, administrative agencies, congressional offices, campaign consulting firms, and lobbying firms. Alumnae of the program occupy the halls of Congress, campaign war rooms, K Street offices, state legislatures, city councils, and corporate boardrooms across the country.

In collaboration with the Barbara Lee Family Foundation, WPI launched Gender on the Ballot, a new non-partisan project that examines and contextualizes gender dynamics during the 2020 election cycle. Through analysis and commentary from scholars, political strategists, and practitioners, the project explores the ways gender shapes political decision-making, media coverage, and campaigning.

The institute regularly hosts special events that complement their courses, academic work, and research. From networking events to book signings, panel discussions, and film screenings, these events take WPI students out of the classroom and into the most connected city in the world. WPI's special events bring together well-known politicians, media personalities, policy experts, diplomats, authors, and academics to discuss the status of women in politics and how to increase women's political involvement.

Betsy Fischer Martin serves as the current executive director of the Women & Politics Institute as well as Executive in Residence in the School of Public Affairs at American University. Betsy Fischer Martin is an Emmy-winning journalist and TV news executive. She is also a former co-host of Bloomberg Politics' Masters in Politics Podcast. She also founded her own consulting business, Fischer Martin Media, where she specializes in providing media training to corporate executives. During her earlier career in television news, she was the Managing Editor of NBC News Political Programming, where she was responsible for the development and execution of network political coverage. Before being promoted to the executive role at NBC News in 2013, Fischer Martin was the executive producer of the top-rated Sunday morning public affairs program, Meet the Press, for 11 years. Overall, her tenure with the program extended over 22 years, beginning as an internship during her senior year of college. She serves on the Board of Directors of Washington's International Women's Forum and the National Press Club's Journalism Institute. She is a life member of the Council on Foreign Relations and a member of the Young Global Leaders of the World Economic Forum.
