= Jonathan Martin (journalist) =

American journalist (born 1977)

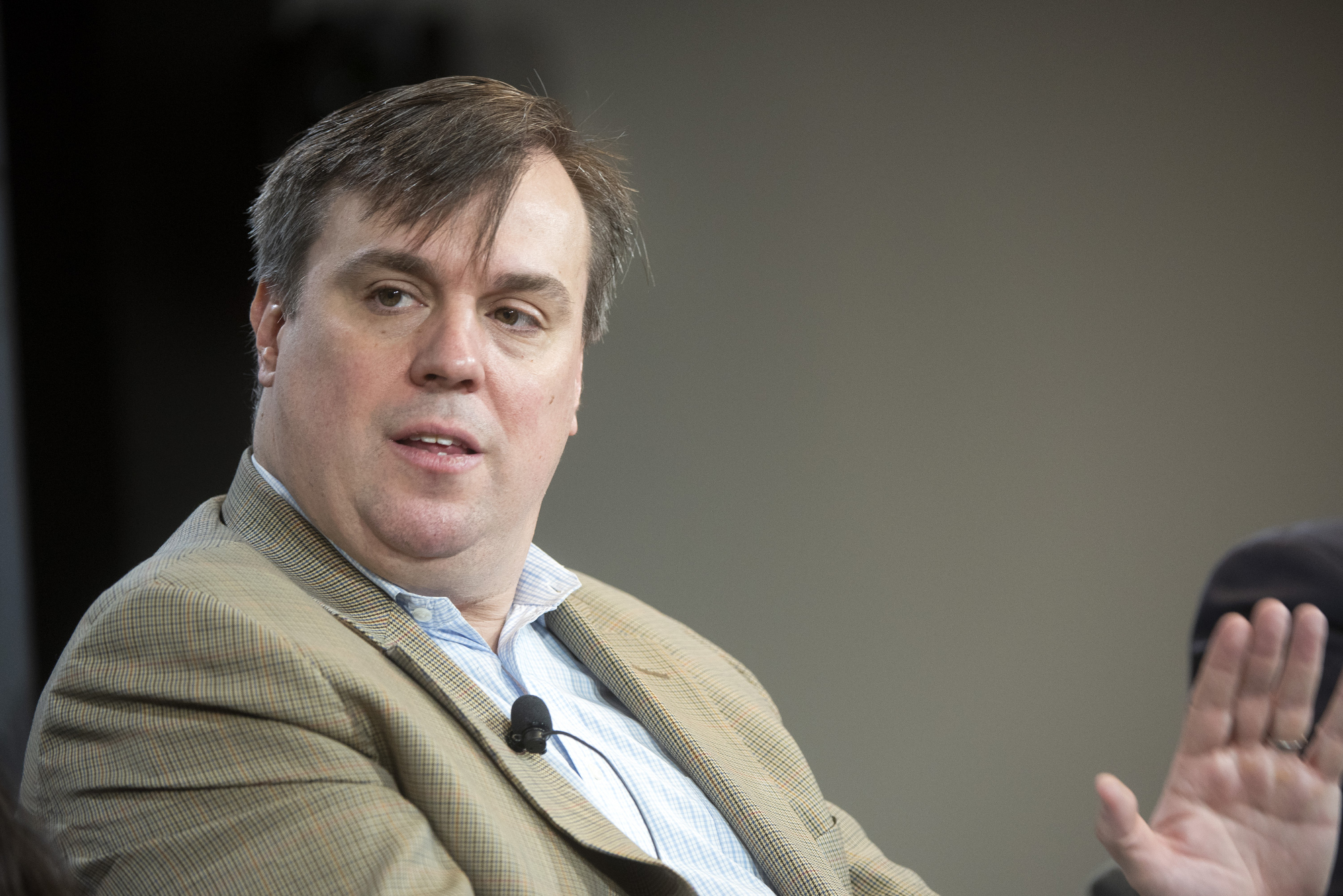
- Born: c. 1977 (age 48–49); Arlington, Virginia, U.S.
- Education: Hampden-Sydney College (BA)
- Spouse: Elizabeth Fischer

Jonathan Martin (born c. 1977) is an American political journalist. He is Politico’s politics bureau chief and senior political columnist, the co-author of the 2012 book The End of the Line: Romney vs. Obama: The 34 Days That Decided the Election, and the co-author of the 2022 book This Will Not Pass: Trump, Biden, and the Battle for America's Future.

== Early life ==
Jonathan Martin was born around 1977 in Arlington, Virginia. He majored in history at Hampden–Sydney College, where he graduated with a bachelor of arts degree.

== Career ==
Martin worked as a political reporter for National Journal's "The Hotline," the National Review and Politico. In 2013, he joined The New York Times as a national political correspondent. In 2022 he returned to Politico as Politics Bureau Chief and a senior political columnist.

With Glenn Thrush, Martin co-authored a book about the 2012 United States presidential election. In a review for Chicago magazine, Carol Felsenthal noted that it was "full of insider intelligence."

Together with fellow New York Times reporter Alexander Burns, Martin authored the book This Will Not Pass: Trump, Biden, and the Battle for America’s Future on the last months of Donald Trump's presidency, the COVID-19 pandemic, and the January 6, 2021 attack on the US Capitol building, which was published in May 2022.

In 2025, Martin was a fellow at the USC Center for the Political Future.

== Personal life ==
Martin married Elizabeth Fischer in 2012.

== Works ==
- Martin, Jonathan; Thrush, Glenn (2012). The End of the Line: Romney vs. Obama: The 34 Days That Decided the Election. New York: Random House. ISBN 9780679645108. OCLC 825555580.
- Jonathan Martin & Alexander Burns, This Will Not Pass: Trump, Biden, and the Battle for America's Future. Simon & Schuster, 2022 ISBN 9781982172480
