= Clyda Stokes Rent =

American academic administrator

Clyda S. Rent

President of Mississippi University for Women
- In office 1989–2001
- Preceded by: Delene W. Lee
- Succeeded by: Lenore Prather

Personal details
- Spouse: George S. Rent
- Education: Florida State University

Clyda Stokes Rent is an American academic, and the former President of Mississippi University for Women. Rent graduated with her Bachelors, Masters, and Doctorate from Florida State University. While in graduate school at FSU she was awarded a National Institute of Mental Health Fellowship, and formally studied sociology.

In 1989, Rent became the first female President of Mississippi University for Women. Prior to this appointment she spent 17 years at Queens University of Charlotte. While there she rose to vice president, and she also created the Masters of Business Administration Program.

== Awards ==
- "Grad Made Good Award" (1990) - Omicron Delta Kappa
- One of the nation's ten most admired managers (1993) - Working Women Magazine
- Women who make a difference award (2000) - International Women's Forum
