= Mary Comfort Leonard =

American educator and sorority founder

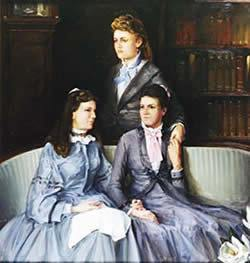
- Standing: Mary Comfort Leonard; Sitting: Eva Webb Dodd and Anna Boyd Ellington, circa 1875.
- Born: Mary Eleanor Comfort; January 22, 1856; Kosciusko, Mississippi, U.S.
- Died: August 4, 1940 (aged 84); Kosciusko, Mississippi, U.S.
- Occupation: Teacher
- Known for: Co-founding the Delta Gamma Fraternity

Mary Eleanor Comfort Leonard (January 22, 1856 – August 4, 1940) was an American educator and one of the three founders of the Delta Gamma women's fraternity.

== Early life ==
Mary Eleanor Comfort was born in Kosciusko, Mississippi in 1856 She was one of four children of Eliza Love (née Durham) and Daniel Benjamin Comfort II. After her mother died in 1859, her father married her maternal aunt, Georgia Brown Durham, resulting in eleven half-brothers and sisters.

Leonard was educated at home. She attended the Lewis School for Girls in Oxford, Mississippi for three years. In 1873, she was one of the three founders of the Delta Gamma women's fraternity, along with Anna Boyd Ellington and Eva Webb Dodd. The fraternity's purpose was to "do good". Comfort later remembers, "We went to a local jeweler and had our pin made–the dear little letter H, which stood for Hope, for we hoped great results and have not been disappointed..."

== Career ==
After college, Leonard was a school teacher in Tennessee for two years, along with her husband. Starting in 1890, she taught in Kosciusko, Mississippi for sixteen years.

== Honors ==
- Delta Gamma commissioned a portrait of Leonard by Helen Humphreys Lawrence. It was dedicated on April 18, 1941, and hangs in the fraternity's Memorial House at the University of Mississippi in Oxford, Mississippi.
- Delta Gamma installed a memorial tablet on Leonard's grave.
- In 1924, Delta Gamma established The Mary Comfort Leonard Fellowship which supports a member's graduate-level studies. It was first awarded in 1930 and came with $500.

== Personal life ==
While at the Lewis School, she met Charles Henry Leonard, who was a student from Memphis at the nearby University of Mississippi who became a teacher. The two married in 1880 and moved to Tennessee; her husband was originally from Memphis. They had three sons: Charles Cecil Leonard, William Comfort Leonard, and Herbert T. Leonard. Later, the couple moved to Marion County, Florida when his health failed; he died in February 1889. After her husband's death, she returned to Kosciusko, Mississippi where she lived on South Jefferson Street.

Comfort was a member of the Twentieth Century Club and taught a children's Bible class at the First Presbyterian Church in Kosciusko. From 1873 to 1874, she served as the secretary of the Delta Gamma Grand Chapter. She attended several Delta Gamma conventions and was present when her granddaughter, Mary Elizabeth "Betty" Leonard, was initiated into the Alpha Psi chapter at the University of Mississippi in February 1938. Three of her great-granddaughters also became members of Delta Gamma.

Comfort died in 1940 in Kosciusko, Mississippi at the age of 84 years. She was buried in the city cemetery in Kosciusko.
