= Alex Burns (journalist) =

American journalist

- Education: Harvard University (AB)
- Employer: The New York Times
- Spouse: MJ Lee

Alexander Burns is an American journalist. He is currently the head of news for Politico and previously was national political correspondent for The New York Times and a political analyst at CNN.

== Education ==
Burns attended the Fieldston School and earned a Bachelor of Arts degree from Harvard College in 2008. He began his career editing the Harvard Political Review and also wrote for a history-themed blog sponsored by American Heritage.

== Career ==
Burns joined the staff of Politico in 2008. He moved to The New York Times in 2015 to cover politics for the Metro desk, before being appointed political correspondent in time for the 2016 presidential election. Burns has also appeared as a guest on Morning Joe. He left the New York Times and returned to POLITICO in the fall of 2022.

Together with fellow New York Times reporter Jonathan Martin, Burns authored the book This Will Not Pass: Trump, Biden, and the Battle for America’s Future on the last months of Donald Trump's presidency, the COVID-19 pandemic, and the January 6, 2021 attack on the US Capitol building, which was published in May 2022.

== Personal life ==
He is married to CNN correspondent MJ Lee, whom he met while working at Politico.

== Works ==
- Jonathan Martin & Alexander Burns, This Will Not Pass: Trump, Biden, and the Battle for America's Future. Simon & Schuster, 2022 ISBN 9781982172480
