= Journal of Women, Politics & Policy =

- Discipline: Political science
- Language: English
- Edited by: Heidi Hartmann

Publication details
- Former names: Women & Politics
- History: 1980–present
- Publisher: Routledge (United States)
- Frequency: Quarterly
- Impact factor: 1.500 (2019)

Standard abbreviations
- ISO 4: J. Women Politics Policy

Indexing
- ISSN: 1554-477X (print); 1554-4788 (web)
- LCCN: 2005213276
- OCLC no.: 57558145

Links
- Journal homepage; Online access; Online archive

The Journal of Women, Politics & Policy is a peer-reviewed academic journal published by Routledge covering women's political roles. It was established in 1980 and changed from Women & Politics to its current name in 2005. The editor-in-chief is Heidi Hartmann (Institute for Women's Policy Research).

== Abstracting and indexing ==
The journal is abstracted and indexed in the Social Sciences Citation Index and Current Contents/Social & Behavioral Sciences. According to the Journal Citation Reports, the journal has a 2019 impact factor of 1.500, ranking it 15th out of 45 journals in the category "Women's Studies".

== See also ==
- List of women's studies journals
