= Delta Gamma =

North American collegiate sorority

- ΔΓ
- Founded: December 25, 1873; 152 years ago Lewis School
- Type: Social
- Affiliation: NPC
- Status: Active
- Scope: North America
- Motto: "Do Good"
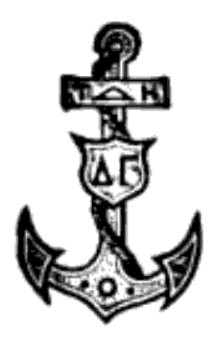
- Member badge
- Colors: Bronze Pink Blue
- Symbol: Anchor
- Flower: Delta Gamma heritage cream rose
- Mascot: Hannah doll
- Publication: ANCHORA
- Philanthropy: Delta Gamma Foundation and Service for Sight
- Chapters: 151 active chapters 200+ alumnae chapters and associations
- Members: 20,000+ active 250,000 lifetime
- Nickname: DG
- Headquarters: 3250 Riverside Drive; Columbus, Ohio 43221; United States
- Website: deltagamma.org

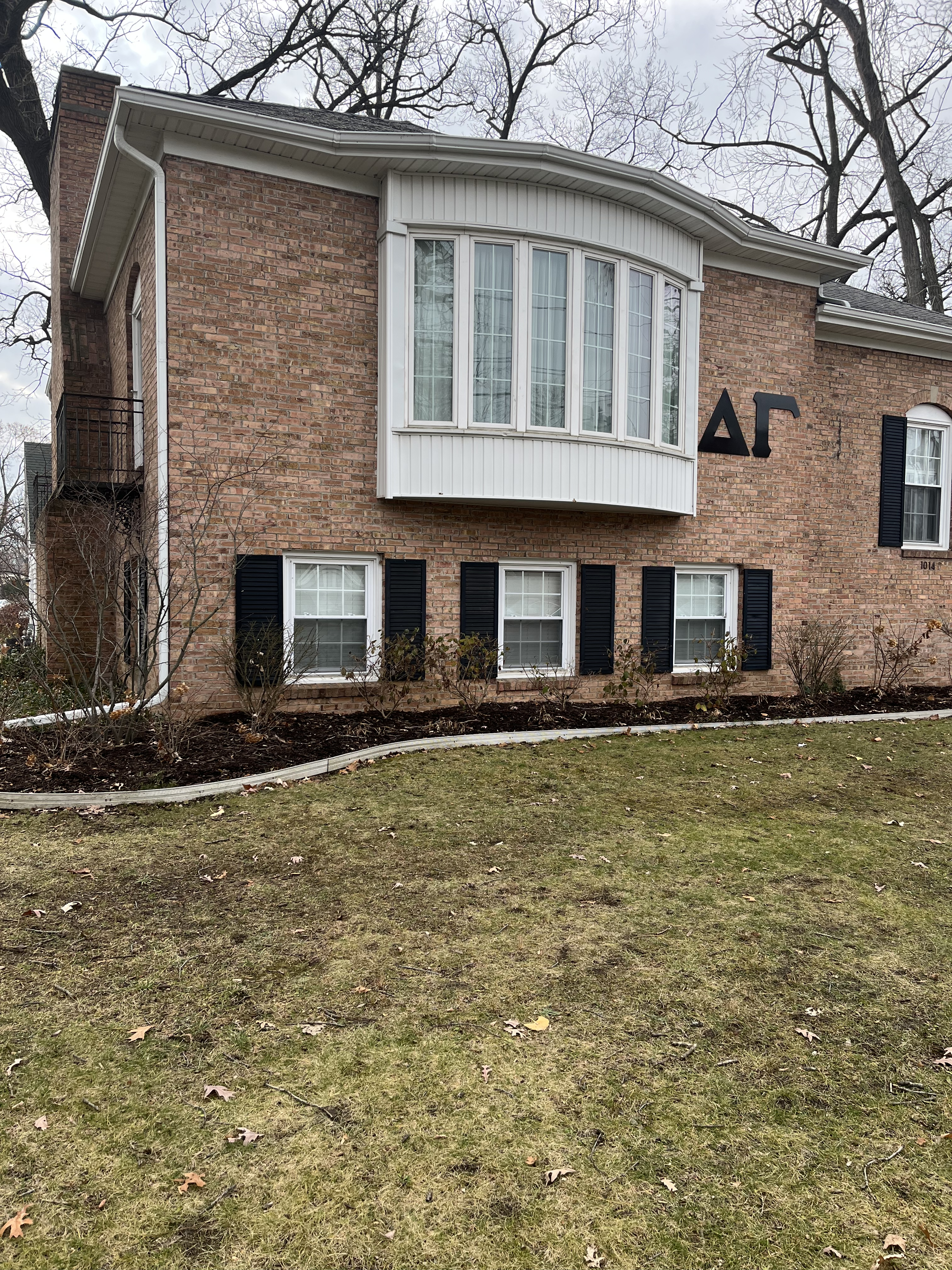
Albion College chapter Lodge

Delta Gamma (ΔΓ), commonly referred to as DG, is a North American women's fraternity. The organization was established in 1873 at the Lewis School in Oxford, Mississippi. It has 149 collegiate chapters and over 170 alumnae groups. The organization's executive office is in Columbus, Ohio. Delta Gamma is one of the original seven charter members of the National Panhellenic Conference.

== History ==
Delta Gamma was founded as a fraternity in December 1873 at the Lewis School in Oxford, Mississippi, near the University of Mississippi. It was called a fraternity because the term "sorority" was not yet in use. The group's founders were Mary Comfort Leonard, Eva Webb Dodd, and Anna Boyd Ellington.

Delta Gamma's early growth was to women's colleges in the southern United States. Within a few years, it expanded into the northern United States and the East with the help of George Banta, a member of Phi Delta Theta fraternity and Delta Gamma's only male initiate.

In 1882, Banta married Lillian Vawter, a Delta Gamma at Franklin College. In his later years, Banta helped rewrite the Delta Gamma ritual. He frequently visited Delta Gamma conventions, often as a guest speaker. He gave his last speech in 1934, a year before his death. Because of Banta, Delta Gamma retains close historical ties with Phi Delta Theta.

Delta Gamma was one of the seven charter members of the National Panhellenic Conference when the first inter-sorority meeting was held in Boston, Massachusetts, in 1891. Delta Gamma and the six other charter members formally joined the National Panhellenic Conference in 1902.

By 1907, the fraternity had initiated 2,100 members at seventeen collegiate chapters. It also had five alumni chapter and five alumni associations.

In 2013, Delta Gamma founded the #IAmASororityWoman campaign for members of any sorority to start conversations about what sorority women truly value to combat common stereotypes. The organization's executive office is in Columbus, Ohio.

== Symbols ==
Delta Gamma's motto is "Do Good." Delta Gamma symbol is the anchor, representing hope. Its colors are bronze, pink, and blue. Its flower is a cream-colored rose, registered as the Delta Gamma Heritage Rose with the American Rose Society. The Hannah Doll is its mascot. Its publication is the ANCHORA, which has been published quarterly continuously since 1884.

Before the adoption of the golden anchor, Delta Gamma's symbol was simply an "H" for "Hope". In 1877, the Hope badge was changed to the traditional symbol of hope, the anchor. Today's badge is a golden anchor with a raised cable wrapping around the anchor, with the Greek letters ΔΓ on a white shield. Its new member pin is a white enamel shield with the Greek letters ΠΑ.

== Philanthropy ==
The Delta Gamma Foundation was formed in 1951. It has three main philanthropic focuses: service for sight, grants to the fraternity for educational and leadership purposes, and grants to individual members. Members and local chapters contribute to its funds. Delta Gamma gives more than 150,000 volunteer hours to service for sight each year.

The fraternity is one of the first recipients of the Helen Keller Philanthropic Service Award, given by the American Foundation for the Blind for assistance to those who are visually impaired and for sight conservation. It was also the first recipient of the Virginia Boyce Award presented by Prevent Blindness America.

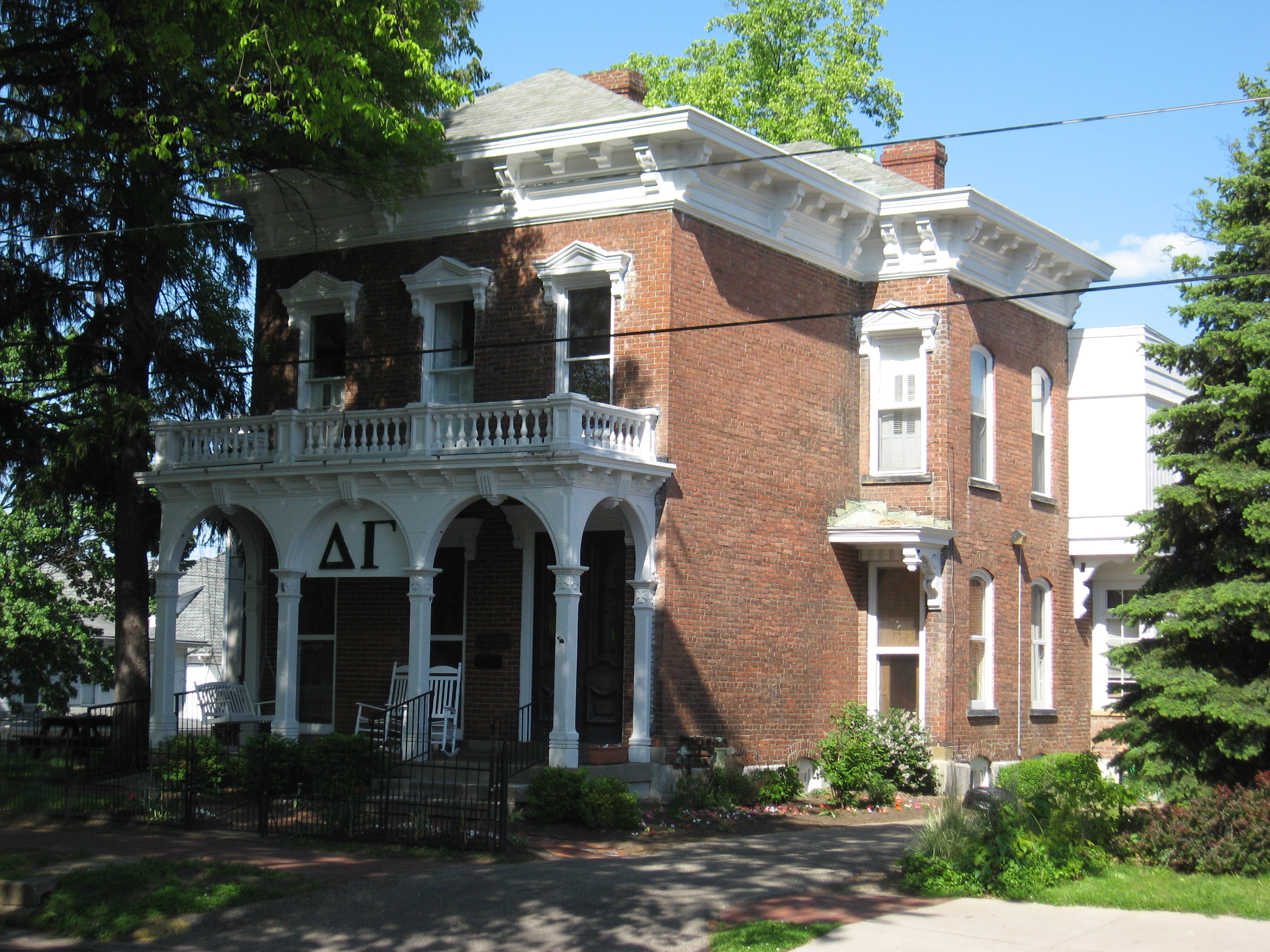
Ohio University chapter house

Anchor Splash and Anchor Games are Delta Gamma's fundraising events hosted on college campuses across North America. The proceeds of these events go to Delta Gamma's philanthropy, such as service for sight. Anchor Splash is a synchronized swimming event. The event has different campus organizations create a synchronized swimming dance. The dance is performed at Anchor Splash for an audience. Each chapter decides how to implement these events on its campus; some host flag football tournaments or volleyball tournaments as their fundraiser.

== Membership ==
Potential members must attend a college where there is a Delta Gamma chapter. Members join through either formal recruitment or continuous open bidding (COB). A COB can occur when a potential new member wants to join outside of recruitment. Joining outside of recruitment can happen at any time of the year.

== Chapters ==
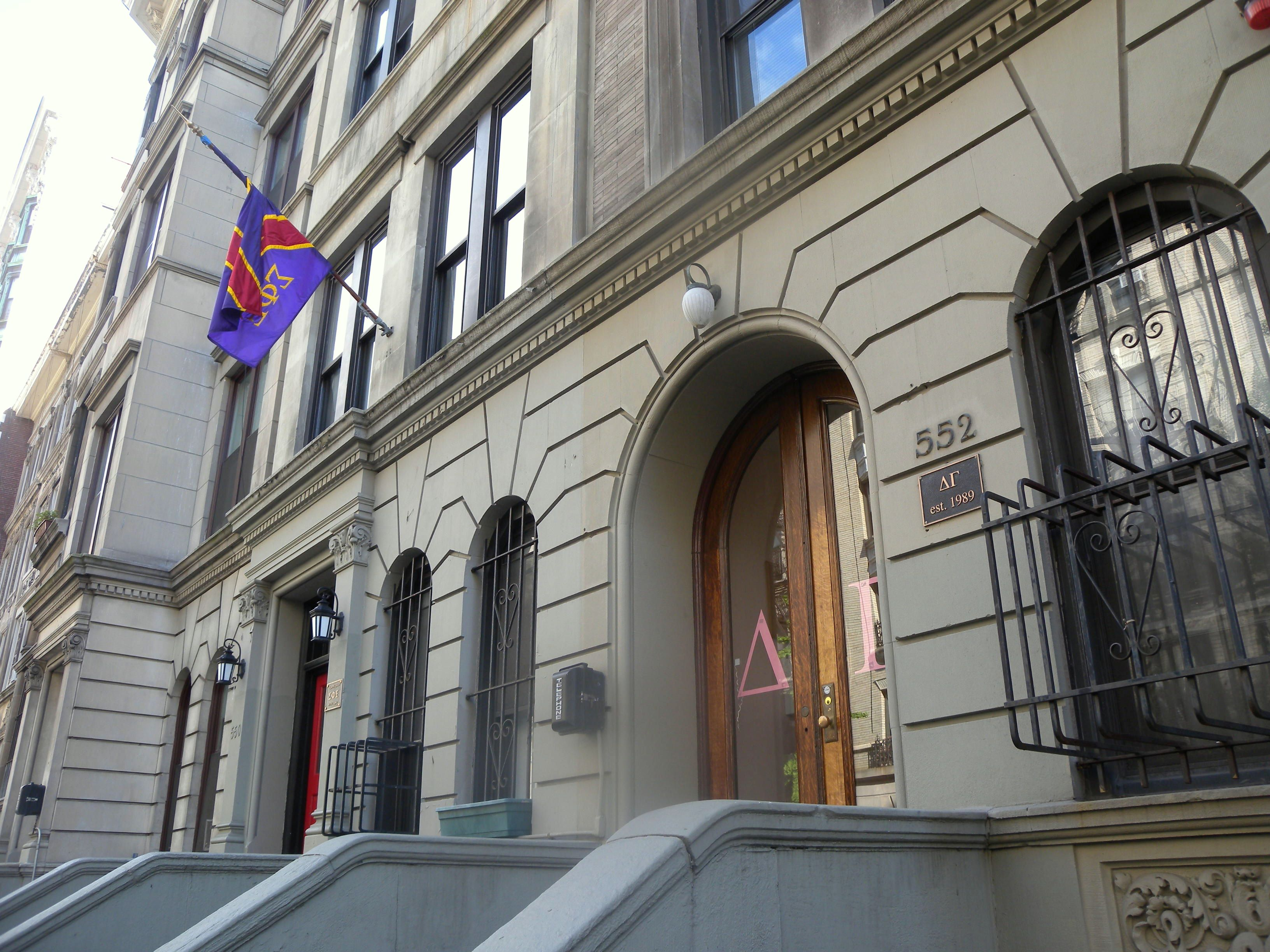
Columbia University chapter house

Delta Gamma includes 149 collegiate chapters and over 170 alumnae groups across North America, Canada and the United Kingdom.

== Notable members ==
Delta Gamma has over 280,000 initiated members.

== See also ==
- List of social sororities and women's fraternities
