= List of public administration journals =

This is a list of public administration journals presenting representative academic journals in the field of public administration.

== A ==
- American Review of Public Administration
- Administration and Society

== D ==
- Developments in Administration (DinA)

== E ==
- European Journal on Criminal Policy and Research

== G ==
- Governance

== I ==
- International Journal of Rural Management
- International Review of Administrative Sciences

== J ==
- Journal of Public Administration Research and Theory
- Journal of Public Affairs Education
- Journal of Urban Affairs

== N ==
- National Civic Review
- National Tax Journal
- Nonprofit and Voluntary Sector Quarterly

== P ==
- Policy Sciences
- Policy Studies Journal
- Public Administration
- Public Administration and Development
- Public Administration Review
- Public Budgeting and Finance
- Public Performance and Management Review
- Public Personnel Management
- Public Policy and Administration
- Publius: The Journal of Federalism
- Public Works Management and Policy

== R ==
- Review of Policy Research
- Review of Public Personnel Administration
- Risk, Hazards & Crisis in Public Policy

== S ==
- State and Local Government Review

== T ==
- Teaching Public Administration

== U ==
- Urban Affairs Review

== V ==
- Voluntas
