= Jered Carr =

Political scientist

Jered Byron Carr, Jr.
- Born: Florida
- Citizenship: United States
- Education: Florida State University; Florida Atlantic University
- Known for: Local government in the United States
- Awards: Leonard D. White Award
- Scientific career
- Fields: Public policy Political science Public Administration
- Workplaces: Florida State Legislature; Wayne State University; College of Charleston; University of Missouri-Kansas City
- Thesis: The Political Economy of Local Government Boundary Change: State Laws, Local Actors, and Collection Action (2001)

Jered Byron Carr is a political scientist, professor of urban policy and a former Policy analyst for the Florida State Legislature in the Office of Program Policy Analysis and Government Accountability.

He was formerly the Director of the L.P. Cookingham Institute of Urban Affairs and Professor of Henry W. Bloch School of Management at University of Missouri-Kansas City and was a former researcher at Center for International Public Management. Presently, he is Co-Editor and Managing Editor of the Urban Affairs Review and Head of the Department in Public Administration at University of Illinois at Chicago.

== Background ==
Carr earned his Ph.D. degree in public administration from the Askew School at Florida State University where his dissertation, The Political Economy of Local Government Boundary Change: State Laws, Local Actors, and Collection Action, received the 2001 Leonard D. White Award from the American Political Science Association. Previously, he earned an M.A. in economics and B.A. in finance from Florida Atlantic University. Carr taught at Wayne State University and the College of Charleston.

== Editor ==
Carr is co-editor of City-County Consolidation and Its Alternatives: Reshaping the Local Government Landscape (by M.E. Sharpe, 2004, New York City, ISBN 978-0-7656-0941-0).

He also currently serves as the co-editor of the “Reviews and Essays” section of the State and Local Government Review. His research has been published in a wide range of journals in public administration and urban affairs, including the American Review of Public Administration, Political Research Quarterly, Public Administration Review, Publius, State and Local Government Review, Urban Affairs Review and Urban Studies.

=== Selected bibliography ===
- Feiock, Richard C.; Jered B. Carr (2001). "Incentives, Entrepreneurs, and Boundary Change. A Collective Action Framework". Urban Affairs Review. 36 (3): 382–405. doi:10.1177/10780870122184902. S2CID 51832986.
- Brower, Ralph S.; Mitchel Y. Abolafia; Jered Carr (2000). "On Improving Qualitative Methods in Public Administration Research". Administration & Society. 32 (4): 363–397. doi:10.1177/00953990022019470. S2CID 144404593.
- Feiock, Richard C.; Jered B. Carr (1997). "A Reassessment of City/County Consolidation: Economic Development Impacts". State and Local Government Review. 29 (3): 166–171. doi:10.1177/0160323X9702900304. JSTOR 4355186. S2CID 155680229.
- Carr, Jered B.; Richard C. Feiock (2001). "State Annexation 'Constraints' and the Frequency of Nunicipal Annexation". Political Research Quarterly. 54 (2): 459–470. doi:10.1177/106591290105400212. S2CID 154858974.
- Leroux, Kelly; Jered Carr (2007). "Explaining Local Government Cooperation on Public Works. Evidence From Michigan". Public Works Management & Policy. 12 (1): 344–358. doi:10.1177/1087724X07302586. S2CID 15706293.
- Carr, Jered B.; Shanthi Karuppusamy (2008). "Beyond Ideal Types of Municipal Structure. Adapted Cities in Michigan". American Review of Public Administration. 39 (3): 304–321. doi:10.1177/0275074008319217. S2CID 154828179.
- Carr, Jered B.; Sang-Seok Bae; Wenjue Lu (2006). "City-County Government and Promises of Economic Development: A Tale of Two Cities". State and Local Government Review. 38 (3): 131–141. doi:10.1177/0160323X0603800301. S2CID 145574689.
- Leroux, Kelly; Jered B. Carr (2010). "Prospects for Centralizing services in an Urban County: Evidence from eight Self-organized Networks of Local Public Services". Journal of Urban Affairs. 32 (4): 449–470. doi:10.1111/j.1467-9906.2010.00512.x. S2CID 154650478.
