= Elena Fuentes-Afflick =

American pediatrician

- Education: UC Berkeley School of Public Health; University of Michigan; UCSF Medical Center
- Scientific career
- Workplaces: University of California, San Francisco

Elena Fuentes-Afflick is an American pediatrician who is Chief of Pediatrics at the Zuckerberg San Francisco General Hospital and Vice Dean for Academic Affairs in the School of Medicine at University of California, San Francisco. She is the former President of the Society for Pediatric Research and the American Pediatric Society. In 2010 she was elected a to the National Academy of Medicine.

== Early life and education ==
Fuentes-Afflick was an undergraduate student in biomedical sciences at the University of Michigan. After graduating in 1984, she moved to Michigan Medicine, where she earned her medical doctorate in 1986. She moved to the West Coast of the United States, where she worked as a pediatric intern at the UCSF Medical Center. Whilst in California, Fuentes-Afflick completed a Master of Public Health at UC Berkeley School of Public Health.

== Research and career ==
Fuentes-Afflick was appointed to the faculty of the University of California, San Francisco. She was awarded a Citation for Outstanding Service from the American Academy of Pediatrics in 1994.

Fuentes-Afflick is a pediatrician and epidemiologist, with a particular focus on immigrant health and health disparities. She has concentrated on equality within the research community, specifically focussing on compensation inequities in academic medicine.

Fuentes-Afflick worked with the National Academies of Sciences, Engineering, and Medicine to investigate the impact of the COVID-19 pandemic on the careers of women in science. Together with Eve Higginbotham, Leslie Gonzales, Beronda Montgomery and Renetta Garrison Tull, Fuentes-Afflick argued that the pandemic endangered the retention of women in the academy.

== Awards and honors ==
- 2009 Elected President of the Society for Pediatric Research
- 2010 Elected to the National Academy of Medicine
- 2013 Society for Pediatric Research Thomas A. Hazinski Distinguished Service Award
- 2020 Elected to the American Academy of Arts and Sciences
- 2020 Elected to the Council of the National Academy of Medicine

== Selected publications ==
- Glenn Flores; Elena Fuentes-Afflick; Oxiris Barbot; et al. (1 July 2002). "The health of Latino children: urgent priorities, unanswered questions, and a research agenda". JAMA. 288 (1): 82–90. doi:10.1001/jama.288.1.82. ISSN 0098-7484. PMID 12090866. Wikidata Q31090484.
- Jennifer S Haas; Rebecca A Jackson; Elena Fuentes-Afflick; Anita L Stewart; Mitzi L Dean; Phyllis Brawarsky; Gabriel J Escobar (1 January 2005). "Changes in the health status of women during and after pregnancy". Journal of General Internal Medicine. 20 (1): 45–51. doi:10.1111/j.1525-1497.2004.40097.x. ISSN 0884-8734. PMC 1490030. PMID 15693927. Wikidata Q34722582.
- Naomi E Stotland; Jennifer S Haas; Phyllis Brawarsky; Rebecca A Jackson; Elena Fuentes-Afflick; Gabriel J Escobar (1 March 2005). "Body mass index, provider advice, and target gestational weight gain". Obstetrics & Gynecology. 105 (3): 633–638. doi:10.1097/01.aog.0000152349.84025.35. ISSN 0029-7844. PMID 15738036. Wikidata Q46288822.
- Bauer, Tamar; Fuld, Jennifer; Fuentes-Afflick, Elena; New York Forum for Child Health; New York Academy of Medicine; University of California, San Francisco (2003). Challenges obtaining well-baby care among Latina mothers in New York and California. New York: New York Forum for Child Health : New York Academy of Medicine. OCLC 866910275.
