= GPSA =

GPSA may stand for:

- Georgia Political Science Association, Professional association for political scientists in Georgia, USA
- Green Party of South Africa
- GPSA Journal
- Gas Processors Suppliers Association
