= Adam Stone =

American professor and political scientist

Adam Stone is an American professor and political scientist specializing in the area of American politics. Stone is an associate professor at Georgia State University's Perimeter College and a former president of the Georgia Political Science Association.

== Education ==
Stone received a Bachelor of Arts in political science from University of California, Berkeley, and a Master of Arts in politics from Brandeis University in 1988.

== Career ==
In 1991, Stone joined the faculty of DeKalb College (now Perimeter College). He is currently the associate department chair for social science at the Alpharetta Campus. He is an associate professor in the department of history and political science. In 2004, Stone served as the president of the Georgia Political Science Association. Stone is editor-in-chief of Questions in Politics, the academic journal of the Georgia Political Science Association. Stone has appeared in and been quoted in the media on topics related to politics and political science. These publications include The Atlanta Journal-Constitution, Georgia Public Broadcasting, Gwinnett Daily Post, WABE, Rome News-Tribune, Atlanta Business Chronicle, and CBS News.

In May 2019, Stone appeared on the television trivia game show Jeopardy!. He went up against longtime Jeopardy! champion and record setter James Holzhauer.
