= Japan Echo =

English language Japanese periodical

- Cover of the first issue of Japan Echo magazine
- Categories: Japanese politics, Foreign affairs
- Frequency: Quarterly (1974–1996), Bimonthly (1997–2010)
- Publisher: Japan Echo Inc.
- First issue: November 1974
- Final issue: February 2010
- Country: Japan
- Based in: Tokyo
- Language: English, French (1979–2009), Spanish (1988–2009)
- Website: JapanEcho.com

Japan Echo was an English-language periodical on Japanese issues which was initially published in print form by Japan Echo Inc. between 1974 and 2010. Consisting mainly of translations into English of magazine and news articles originally published in Japanese, Japan Echo was launched with the support of Japan's Foreign Affairs Ministry "to enable people abroad to learn what the Japanese themselves are thinking and writing about the issues of the day." Though independently published, the Japanese government provided most of Japan Echo's funding for the duration of its existence.

In 2010 budget cuts compelled the magazine to rebrand itself as Japan Echo Web, a purely online magazine published on a website operated by the Foreign Affairs Ministry. However, two years later the Japanese government shut it down and replaced it with a similar project called the Japan Foreign Policy Forum.

== Origin and content ==
Japan Echo was the brainchild of Kazutoshi Hasegawa, an employee at the Overseas Public Relations Division of the Japanese Foreign Affairs Ministry, who was disturbed by what he perceived to be misinformation and misunderstandings about Japan printed in the foreign press. Hasegawa recruited Yoshihiko Seki, a social scientist teaching at Tokyo Metropolitan University, to be the first editor of the new journal, which was to be published independently by a new company called Japan Echo Inc. founded in June 1974 by Jiji Press reporter Takeshi Mochida.

Most of Japan Echo's contents were translations, sometimes abridged, of Japanese language essays. For each issue the journal's editors selected what they considered the best articles published in major Japanese magazines on topics which were of Japanese or international significance at that time. For instance the first issue of November 1974 included eighteen articles from periodicals including Chūōkōron, Shokun!, Jiyū, Shūkan Gendai, Bungeishunjū, and Seiron grouped into topics like the oil crisis, the Solzhenitsyn case, Japanese relations with southeast Asia where Prime Minister Kakuei Tanaka's state visits had been greeted by mass protests, and the case of Lieutenant Hiroo Onoda. The editors of Japan Echo said that they desired to "faithfully reflect a spectrum of responsible and informed Japanese opinion", though most of its editors were considered to be politically right-of-center.

Japan Echo was at first released on a quarterly basis, but switched to a bimonthly format from 1997 and onward. It also had a French language edition which existed from 1979 and 2009 and a Spanish language edition from 1988 to 2009.

Sumiko Iwao, a member of the editorial board from 1985 until 2007, also served as the magazine's editor-in-chief from 1997 until her retirement in 2007.

== Sources of funding and support ==
At the magazine's founding the Japanese Foreign Affairs Ministry promised Japan Echo Inc. CEO Takeshi Mochida that it would not interfere with the selection of articles, but even so Japan Echo was always highly reliant on support from the Japanese government. Throughout the journal's existence the Japanese government bought 70 percent of its print run, amounting to 50,000 copies annually, and distributing it free of charge to its embassies and consulates and then in turn to universities, libraries, and researchers. The Economist magazine concluded that the Foreign Affairs Ministry continued to sponsor Japan Echo because it presented "a view of the country that the Japanese government likes the world to see."

However, Japan Echo magazine also earned revenue from other sources including private subscriptions, bulk sales to Toyota Motors and Japan Airlines, and from the independent translation services provided by Japan Echo Inc.

== Praise and criticism ==
The reference book, Magazines for Libraries described Japan Echo as an "excellent quarterly" which was "particularly valuable because it presents the Japanese in their own terms, unmediated by foreign 'experts'." "Controversial topics", the book noted, "are not avoided."

Japan Echo was also praised by Canadian liberal Prime Minister Pierre Trudeau for its quality and readability. Its 1987 special edition on Tokyo was described by a The Japan Times columnist as "one of the best pieces ever done" on the subject and its coverage of the controversy over the Nanking Massacre was endorsed by the conservative newspaper Yomiuri Shimbun for its "focus on facts, rather than getting caught up in emotional bluster."

Many scholars supported the magazine including Hugh Cortazzi, although he also condemned one issue from 2006 which reprinted an interview between Shōichi Watanabe and Tarō Asō in which Watanabe denied the Nanking Massacre and advocated Japanese exceptionalism. In the same vein The Globe and Mail was highly critical of a 1984 issue in which a series of authors seemed to be watering down Japan's responsibility for World War II by arguing that "Japan, simply to assure its own survival, was given little choice but to wage war with the United States."

Roy Andrew Miller's book Japan's Modern Myth includes an extended criticism of Japan Echo, which he accuses of being a "public-relations organ" promoting the same discredited ideas of Japanese linguistic and cultural uniqueness found in the Kokutai no Hongi.

== End of the print magazine ==
To deal with Japan's mounting fiscal deficits, the newly elected government of Yukio Hatoyama formed the Government Revitalization Unit in 2009 to look for areas where the budget could be trimmed. The Unit recommended that the government cease purchasing and distributing foreign language periodicals like Japan Echo.

The government initially followed through with this recommendation but the move was widely disapproved of by scholars of Japanese affairs including Cortazzi and thanks in part to their protests the Foreign Affairs Ministry eventually agreed to revive Japan Echo as an online magazine, which would be produced on an annual basis by whichever company put forward the best bid.

== Japan Echo Web ==
Japan Echo Web
- Logo used on the former Japan Echo Web homepage.
- Categories: Japanese politics, Foreign affairs
- Frequency: Bimonthly
- Publisher: Japan Echo Inc.(2010–2011), The Japan Journal (2011–2012)
- First issue: June 2010
- Final issue: May 2012
- Country: Japan
- Based in: Tokyo
- Language: English, Chinese

Nippon.com
- Logo used on Nippon.com in Japanese
- Website type: Japan
- Available in: 7 languages
- List of languages Japanese, Arabic, Chinese (Traditional, Simplified), English, French, Russian, Spanish
- Founded: Nippon Communications Foundation
- Predecessor: Japan Echo Web
- Headquarters: 4F, Sasakawa Peace Foundation Building, Toranomon, Minato-ku, Tokyo, Japan
- Area served: Global
- Owner: Nippon Communications Foundation
- Founder: Japan Echo Inc.
- Editor: Harukata Takenaka
- President: Akasaka Kiyotaka
- Website: nippon.com
- Advertising: No
- Commercial: No
- Registration: No
- Launched: October 3, 2011; 15 years ago
- Current status: Alive
- Content license: All rights reserved

Japan Echo Inc. won the first competitive bid to publish Japan Echo Web in 2010. The new online magazine would be released bimonthly in English and Chinese on a website owned by the Japanese Foreign Affairs Ministry, though as before the editors of Japan Echo Inc. had the final say over its contents "in order to keep the publication from being government propaganda." The launch of the new magazine was praised in the journal Asian Politics & Policy for eschewing propaganda and providing "up-to-date, reliable information on current events".

In 2011 Japan Echo Inc. concluded that annual bidding for its status as publisher of Japan Echo Web was "not a sustainable business model" and broke with the Japanese government after 37 years of cooperation. Japan Echo Inc. became the Nippon Communications Foundation which today has its own online magazine Nippon.com "driven by the same spirit that inspired the journal Japan Echo".

A new group called The Japan Journal took over the magazine for the next fiscal year, after which the government terminated the Japan Echo brand for good and replaced it on November 26, 2012 with an official successor called Japan Foreign Policy Forum.

== See also ==
- Contemporary Japan
