= Felbinger =

Felbinger is a German surname. It is derived from the Middle High German word felwe, meaning willow tree, and thus is a toponymic surname for a person living on a piece of land on which willow trees are growing.

Notable people with the name include:

- Claire L. Felbinger (1956–2008), American political scientist and public administration expert
- Jeremias Felbinger (1616–1690), German Socinian writer, teacher, and lexicographer
- Johann Felbinger (1724–1788), minister in the Prussian government, Austrian school reformer
