= Norman Chester =

Sir Daniel Norman Chester, CBE (27 October 1907 – 20 September 1986) was a British political economist and academic administrator. He was the warden of Nuffield College, Oxford, from 1954 to 1978.

== Early life and education ==
Chester was born in 1907 in Chorlton-cum-Hardy, a suburb of Manchester. He was the son of Daniel Chester, who sold cotton, and his wife Edith, née Robinson. He attended St Clement's Church of England School, leaving at the age of fourteen. His first position was with Manchester City Council in the treasurer's department. He gained external BA (1930) and MA degrees (1933) from Manchester University; his MA thesis was entitled "The rating of land values". He joined the university as a researcher and subsequently a lecturer. In 1935, he travelled to the U.S. with a Rockefeller Fellowship where he studied public utilities (1935–36).

== Career ==
During the Second World War, he worked for the War Cabinet administration, under Herbert Morrison, Sir John Anderson and Sir William Beveridge, including as secretary of the committee on social insurance and allied services (1941–1942).

Immediately after the war, Chester became a fellow of the recently founded Nuffield College, Oxford, and served as its warden from 1954 to 1978. During his tenure, the college gained its royal charter. He is credited by David Butler and others with persuading the college's founder, William Morris, Lord Nuffield, to become associated with the college again after disagreements with G. D. H. Cole. Chester also promoted the college's association with the French Fondation Nationale des Sciences Politiques and other European groups. He assembled source materials for an unpublished history of the college.

His research was in the area of British government and administration. He was the editor of the Royal Institute of Public Administration's academic journal, Public Administration (1943–1966), and also served as chair of the institute (1953–1954). He was involved in the foundation of several national and international bodies, including the Study of Parliament Group, the British Political Studies Association and the International Political Science Association. He served as president of the Study of Parliament Group (1971–1986) and of the International Political Science Association (1961–1964). He was also instrumental in the foundation of the Oxford Centre for Management Studies (now the Saïd Business School), and served as its chair (1965–1975).

Chester had a keen interest in football. He chaired a government committee of inquiry into the sport (1966–1968). He subsequently chaired the Football Grounds Improvement Trust and was deputy chair of the Football Trust.

== Personal life ==
In 1936, he married Eva, née Jeavons (died 1980), the daughter of a butcher. The couple had no children. He retired in 1978, and died at Oxford in 1986.

== Awards, honours and legacy ==
He was appointed CBE in 1951. He received an honorary DLitt from Manchester University in 1968. In 1974, he received a knighthood and in 1976, was made chevalier of the French Légion d'honneur.

Nuffield College keeps a large collection of his papers and De Montfort University holds his football-related papers.

== Selected works ==
- Central and Local Government: Financial and Administrative Relations (1951)
- The nationalised industries: an analysis of the statutory provisions (1951)
- Lessons of the British War Economy (1951; editor)
- Questions in Parliament (1962)
- The Nationalisation of British Industry, 1945–51 (1975)
- The English Administrative System, 1780–1870 (1981)
- Economics, Politics and Social Studies in Oxford, 1900–45 (1986)
