= Marc Holzer =

American scholar

Marc Holzer is an American public administration scholar and distinguished professor of public administration at Suffolk University, and was formerly Founding Dean and University Professor at the Rutgers University School of Public Affairs and Administration. His primary research interests include public service, public affairs and administration, public performance improvement, comparative public administration, public management and citizen engagement in the U.S. and internationally.

== Education ==
Holzer received a B.A. in political science from the University of Rochester in 1966. In 1968, he received his M.P.A. (Master of Public Administration) from the University of Michigan, and in 1971 a Ph.D. in political science from the University of Michigan. His dissertation focused on "Public Policy-Making Theory."

== Career ==
Holzer's academic career began at the City University of New York's John Jay College as an Assistant Professor of Public Administration in 1971. He achieved an Associate Professorship in 1975 and full Professorship in 1980. Holzer continued at John Jay College until mid-1989, when he joined Rutgers University at Newark. During his tenure at Rutgers he became a Distinguished Professor of Public Administration in 2002; Board of Governors Professor of Public Affairs and Administration in 2006; and University Professor in 2016. In 2006, Holzer became the Founding Dean of the Rutgers University School of Public Affairs and Administration. In 2017, Holzer retired from Rutgers as an Emeritus Professor and joined Suffolk University's Institute for Public Service in Boston, Massachusetts as a Distinguished Research Professor.

== Published works ==
He has been the founder and editor in chief of Public Performance and Management Review, co-editor of the American Review of Public Administration, and editor in chief of the journals Chinese Public Administration Review, and Public Voices: A Journal of Artistic, Humanistic, and Reflective Expression (PV). He previously served as editor in chief of the International Review of Public Administration (the journal of the Korean Association of Public Administration). He has also edited the ASPA Classics Book Series (1999) and the Public Solutions Books Series (2014). He is the founder of the Virtual Museum of Public Service (2014). Holzer's more than 600 scholarly publications include: 80 Books and Monographs; Editorship of four journals and several book series, comprising 300+ volumes/issues; Editorship/Co-Editorship of 23 Journal Symposia; and Authorship/Co-Authorship of 78 Articles in Peer-Reviewed Journals. In addition, Holzer has served as the chair of almost fifty doctoral dissertations in public administration and global affairs.

== Associations ==
Holzer is a past president of the American Society for Public Administration (ASPA, 2000–2001), and chaired the ASPA Endowment. He is the founder or co-founder of a number of organizations, networks and publications, including: the School of Public Affairs and Administration, Rutgers University-Newark (Founding Dean, 2006-2016); the National Center for Public Performance (1974-2021); the E-Governance Institute (2005); Annual Productivity and Performance Conferences (1974-2026); Sino-U.S. Public Administration Conferences (2002–present); Northeast Conference on Public Administration (NECoPA) (2012); and ASPA sections on Korea, China and Humanities/Arts.

== Honors, awards, and distinctions ==
He has been recognized with over 20 national and international awards for his contributions in the field of research, teaching and service. Selected Honors and Awards include:

- National Academy of Public Administration: Elected Fellow, 2003
- The American Society for Public Administration: Dwight Waldo Award, 2013 for outstanding contributions to the professional literature of public administration over an extended career and the Nesta M. Gallas Award for Exemplary Professionalism in Public Service, 2024
- Public Administration Review, 2015:In recognition of authorship (with Patria de Lancer Julnes) of one of the most 75 influential articles published since PAR's inception in 1940, and the William and Frederick Mosher Award for Best Article (in Public Administration Review) by an Academician, 2001 for that same article
- Paul Van Riper Award for Excellence and Service, 2018
- Joseph Wholey Distinguished Scholarship Award for Best Scholarly Publication in Performance-based Governance in a Public Administration Journal, 2001 (with Patria de Lancer Julnes)
- Charles H. Levine Memorial Award, 2000
- Donald Stone National ASPA Achievement Award, 1994. National Association of Schools of Public Affairs and Administration and The American Society for Public Administration: NASPAA/ASPA Distinguished Research Award, 2009
- National Association of Schools of Public Affairs and Administration: Excellence in Teaching Award, 1998
- Conference of Minority Public Administrators: Presidential Leadership Award, 2006
- Southeastern Conference for Public Administration: The (Netherlands) Senator Peter B. Boorsma Award, 2002
- Public Technology Institute: Elected Fellow, 2016
- Fellow, Center for Media and Peace Initiatives, 2015
- School of Public Policy and Administration – University of Delaware: Charles P. Messick Fellow, 2012
- International City/County Management Association: Academic Award in Memory of Stephen B. Sweeney, 2005
- Chinese Public Administration Society: Honorary Council Member. 2004 and Award for Excellence, 2002
- World Academy of Productivity Science: Elected Fellow, 2001
- Rutgers, the State University of New Jersey: Board of Trustees Award for Excellence in Research, 2001
- The Class of 1962 Presidential Public Service Award, 2002
- Human Dignity Award, 2004
- Leaders in Faculty Diversity Award, 2016
