= Public Administration and Development =

Academic journal on public administration

- Discipline: Public administration
- Language: English
- Edited by: Mariana Chudnovsky and Ian C. Elliott

Publication details
- Former names: Journal of African Administration (1949–1961); Journal of Local Administration Overseas (1962–1966); Journal of Administration Overseas (1966–1980)
- History: 1949–present
- Publisher: Wiley-Blackwell
- Frequency: 5 per year
- Open access: Hybrid
- Impact factor: 2.6 (2023)

Standard abbreviations
- ISO 4: Public Adm. Dev.

Indexing
- ISSN: 1099-162X

Links
- Journal homepage; Online access; Online archive

Public Administration and Development is a peer-reviewed academic journal which covers practice of public administration at the local, regional, national and international levels where it is directed to managing development processes in low and medium income countries. In 2021, the journal was ranked as a Grade 2 journal in the field of public administration. The journal is published by Wiley (publisher) and is edited by Mariana Chudnovsky, Pontifical Catholic University of Chile and Ian C. Elliott (University of Glasgow).

According to the Journal Citation Reports, the journal has a 2023 impact factor of 2.6, ranking it 18th out of 63 journals in the category "Development Studies" and 28th out of 91 journals in the category "Public Administration".

== Editors-in-chief ==
The following persons have been editors-in-chief:

- 2025-Present: Mariana Chudnovsky, Pontifical Catholic University of Chile and Ian C. Elliott, University of Glasgow
- 2023-2025: Ian C. Elliott, Northumbria University and Alfred Wu, National University of Singapore
- 2010-2022: Jose A. Puppim de Oliveira, Fundação Getulio Vargas
- 1993-2010: Paul D. Collins, Royal Institute of Public Administration
- 1984-1992: Brian C. Smith, University of Bath
- 1981-1984: David J. Murray, Professor of Government, Open University
- 1966–1980: Peter Johnston, Administrative Officer, Development Planning Unit, School of Environmental Studies, University of London
- 1964-1965: D. A. Pott, Permanent Secretary, Ministry of Local Government, Northern Nigeria
- 1961-1963: B. V. Davies, Administrative Officer, Fiji
- 1960-1961: P. R. Forsyth Thompson, Administrative Officer, Swaziland
- 1957-1959: Ian Eldridge, Northern Rhodesia
- 1955-1956: John Chant, District Officer, Tanganyika Territory
- 1953-1955: Gilbert Stephenson, Northern Nigeria
- 1949-1952: Sir George Cartland, University of Tasmania

== Abstracting and indexing ==
Public Administration and Development is indexed in:

- Social Sciences Citation Index
- Scopus
- Inspec
- InfoTrac
- GEOBASE
- ABI/INFORM Collection

== See also ==
- List of political science journals
- List of public administration journals
