= Public Administration (journal) =

Quarterly peer-reviewed academic journal

- Discipline: Public administration
- Language: English
- Edited by: Bruce D. McDonald III

Publication details
- Former name: Journal of Public Administration
- History: 1923-present
- Publisher: Wiley-Blackwell
- Frequency: Quarterly
- Open access: Hybrid
- Impact factor: 4.3 (2023)

Standard abbreviations
- ISO 4: Public Adm.

Indexing
- ISSN: 0033-3298 (print); 1467-9299 (web)
- LCCN: 25001505
- OCLC no.: 768105905

Links
- Journal homepage; Online access; Online archive

Public Administration is a quarterly peer-reviewed academic journal which covers research, theory, and practice in public administration, public policy, public organization theory, and public management. It was established in 1923 and was ranked in the top of its field by a 1983 survey. In 2021, the journal was ranked as second in the field of public administration. One of its founders was the Liberal and later Labour statesman Richard Haldane (1st Viscount of Haldane), and the journal awards an annual prize in his honour to the most distinguished practitioner essay published in Public Administration in that year. The journal is published by Wiley (publisher) and is edited by Bruce D. McDonald III (Old Dominion University).

According to the Journal Citation Reports, the journal has a 2023 impact factor of 4.3, ranking it 19th out of 318 journals in the category "Political Science" and 9th out of 91 journals in the category "Public Administration".

== History ==
Public Administration was established by the Royal Institute of Public Administration in 1922. When the first issue of the journal was published in 1923, it was published under the banner of the Journal of Public Administration. The aim of the journal was to publish news and research from the field of public administration in order to improve the "efficiency of public services, and the efficiency of public servants." Initially, the journal was edited by state of the Institute, though the journal elected Norman Chester from Nuffield College, Oxford as its first academic editor-in-chief in 1943. After the Institute's closure in 1992, the journal's editor approached Blackwell Publishers about taking over ownership and distribution of the journal to prevent its closure. Currently, the journal is the official journal of the public administration section of the American Political Science Association.

== Editors-in-chief ==
The following persons have been editors-in-chief:

- 2021-Present: Bruce D. McDonald III, Old Dominion University
- 2012-2020: Martin Lodge, London School of Economics
- 1986–2011: R. A. W. Rhodes, Australian National University
- 1988-1989: Brendan O'Leary, London School of Economics
- 1982-1989: Christopher Pollitt, The Open University
- 1980-1985: J. Michael Lee, University of Bristol
- 1967-1981: Nevil Johnson, Nuffield College, Oxford
- 1943-1966: Norman Chester, Nuffield College, Oxford
- 1923-1942: A. C. Stewart, Royal Institute of Public Administration
- 1923-1923: John Lee, Royal Institute of Public Administration

== Abstracting and Indexing ==
The journal is abstracted and indexed in:

- Social Sciences Citation Index
- Scopus
- Inspec
- InfoTrac
- GEOBASE
- ABI/INFORM Collection

== See also ==
- List of political science journals
- List of public administration journals
- Outline of organizational theory
