= Political Science Research and Methods =

Academic journal

- Discipline: Political science
- Language: English
- Edited by: John D. Griffin

Publication details
- History: 2013–present
- Publisher: Cambridge University Press
- Frequency: Quarterly
- Open access: Hybrid
- Impact factor: 2.5 (2023)

Standard abbreviations
- ISO 4: Political Sci. Res. Methods

Indexing
- ISSN: 2049-8470 (print); 2049-8489 (web)
- LCCN: 2020207090
- JSTOR: 20498470
- OCLC no.: 854909031

Links
- Journal homepage; Online access; Online archive

Political Science Research and Methods is a quarterly peer-reviewed academic journal covering all subfields of political science. It is the official journal of the European Political Science Association and is published by Cambridge University Press. The editor-in-chief is John D. Griffin (Georgetown University).

== Abstracting and indexing ==
The journal is abstracted and indexed in Research Papers in Economics, Social Sciences Citation Index, Current Contents/Social and Behavioral Sciences, ProQuest databases, and Scopus. According to the Journal Citation Reports, the journal has a 2023 impact factor of 2.5.

== See also ==
- List of political science journals
