= Public Policy and Administration =

Quarterly peer-reviewed academic journal

- Discipline: Public administration
- Language: English
- Edited by: Alessandro Sancino, Edoardo Ongaro

Publication details
- History: 1986-present
- Publisher: SAGE Publications
- Frequency: Quarterly
- Impact factor: 1.813 (2018)

Standard abbreviations
- ISO 4: Public Policy Adm.

Indexing
- ISSN: 0952-0767 (print); 1749-4192 (web)
- LCCN: sn87040066
- OCLC no.: 80905264

Links
- Journal homepage; Online access; Online archive

Public Policy and Administration is a quarterly peer-reviewed academic journal that covers the field of public administration. The editors-in-chief are Alessandro Sancino (The Open University), and Edoardo Ongaro (The Open University). It was first published as PAC Bulletin in 1964 later changing its name to Public Administration Bulletin in 1971 before adopting the title Public Policy and Administration in 1986. It is currently published by SAGE Publications in association with the Joint University Council of the Applied Social Sciences Public Administration Committee (PAC).

== Abstracting and indexing ==
The journal is abstracted and indexed in the International Bibliography of the Social Sciences and Scopus.

== See also ==
- List of public administration journals

== Editors ==
- Andrew Dunsire 1964-1968
- Richard A. Chapman 1968-1971
- Brian C Smith 1971-1976
- Grant Jordan and Douglas Pitt 1986-1990
- Barry O'Toole 1990-2000
- Robert Pyper 2000-2008
- Duncan McTavish and Karen Miller 2008-2015
- Claire Dunlop, Edoardo Ongaro and Keith Baker 2015-2021
- Edoardo Ongaro, Keith Baker and Alessandro Sancino 2021–2023
- Edoardo Ongaro and Alessandro Sancino 2023–present
