= Politics and Policy =

Political science journal

- Discipline: Political science
- Language: English
- Edited by: Emma R. Norman and David Mena

Publication details
- Former names: GPSA Journal: The Georgia Political Science Association, Southeastern Political Review
- History: 1973-present
- Publisher: Wiley-Blackwell on behalf of the Policy Studies Organization and the Universidad Iberoamericana, Mexico City, and several additional organizations
- Frequency: Bimonthly

Standard abbreviations
- ISO 4: Politics Policy

Indexing
- ISSN: 1555-5623 (print); 1747-1346 (web)
- LCCN: 2001229437
- OCLC no.: 315069971

Links
- Journal homepage; Online access; Online archive

Politics and Policy is a peer-reviewed academic journal published six times a year by Wiley-Blackwell on behalf of the Policy Studies Organization, the Universidad Iberoamericana, Mexico City, the Alabama Political Science Association, the British Columbia Political Studies Association, the Georgia Political Science Association, the Great Plains Political Science Association, the Louisiana Political Science Association, the Mississippi Political Science Association, the New York State Political Science Association, the North Carolina Political Science Association, the Ohio Association of Economists and Political Scientists, and The Roosevelt Institution. The journal was established in 1973 and the current editors-in-chief are Emma R. Norman (University of the Americas Puebla) and David Mena (Universidad Iberoamericana). The journal publishes articles on public policy, political science, political history, political sociology, public administration, and international relations.
