= List of political science journals =

This is a list of political science journals presenting notable peer-reviewed academic journals in the field of political science.

== A ==
- Acta Politica
- African Affairs
- American Affairs
- American Journal of Political Science
- American Political Science Review
- American Politics Research
- The Annals of the American Academy of Political and Social Science
- Annual Review of Political Science
- Armed Forces & Society
- Australian Journal of Political Science
- Australian Journal of Politics and History
- Australian Quarterly

== B ==
- British Journal of Political Science
- British Journal of Politics and International Relations

== C ==
- Canadian Journal of Political Science
- Caucasian Review of International Affairs
- Central European Journal of International and Security Studies
- Chronicles
- City Journal
- Claremont Review of Books
- Comparative European Politics
- Comparative Political Studies
- Conflict Management and Peace Science
- Constellations
- Contemporary Political Theory
- Cooperation and Conflict
- Critical Review (American journal)

== D ==
- Debatte: Journal of Contemporary Central and Eastern Europe

== E ==
- East European Politics
- Electoral Studies
- Environmental Politics (journal)
- Europe-Asia Studies
- European Journal of International Relations
- European Journal of Political Economy
- European Journal of Political Research
- European Journal of Political Theory
- European Political Science
- European Political Science Review
- European Union Politics

== F ==
- Foreign Affairs
- Foreign Policy
- Foreign Policy Analysis

== G ==
- Geopolitics
- German Politics and Society
- Global Environmental Politics
- Global Governance
- Global Policy
- Government and Opposition
- Governance

== H ==
- History of European Ideas
- History of Political Thought (journal)

== I ==
- Independent Review
- International Affairs
- International Journal of Conflict and Violence
- International Journal of Press/Politics
- International Journal of Transitional Justice
- International Organization
- International Political Science Review
- International Security
- International Studies Quarterly
- International Studies Review
- International Theory

== J ==
- Journal for Peace and Justice Studies
- Journal of Common Market Studies
- Journal of Conflict Resolution
- Journal of Contingencies and Crisis Management
- Journal of Democracy
- Journal of European Integration
- Journal of European Public Policy
- Journal of Information Technology & Politics
- Journal of Law and Economics
- The Journal of Legislative Studies
- Journal of Moral Philosophy
- Journal of Peace Research
- Journal of Political Economy
- Journal of Political Ideologies
- Journal of Political Philosophy
- Journal of Politics
- Journal of Politics & Society
- Journal of Theoretical Politics
- Journal of Women, Politics & Policy

== L ==
- Legislative Studies Quarterly

== M ==
- Mediterranean Politics
- Moral Philosophy and Politics

== N ==
- National Affairs
- Nations and Nationalism
- Nationalities Papers
- The New Atlantis
- The New Criterion
- New Left Review
- New Political Economy
- New Political Science

== P ==
- Parliamentary Affairs
- Party Politics
- Perspectives on Political Science
- Perspectives on Politics
- Philosophy & Public Affairs
- Policy & Internet
- Policy Review (Defunct)
- Policy Studies Journal
- Political Analysis
- Political Behavior
- Political Communication
- Political Geography
- Political Psychology
- The Political Quarterly
- Political Research Quarterly
- Political Science
- Political Science Quarterly
- Political Science Research and Methods
- Political Studies
- Political Studies Review
- Politics
- Politics and the Life Sciences
- Politics & Gender
- Politics, Philosophy & Economics
- Politics & Society
- Political Theory
- Polity
- Presidential Studies Quarterly
- PS: Political Science & Politics
- Public Administration
- Public Choice
- Public Discourse
- Public Opinion Quarterly
- Publius

== Q ==
- Quarterly Journal of Political Science

== R ==
- Radical Philosophy Review
- Regulation & Governance
- Res Publica
- Review of International Organizations
- Review of International Political Economy
- Review of International Studies
- Review of Policy Research
- Review of Politics

== S ==
- Scandinavian Political Studies
- Security Dialogue
- Security Studies
- Social Philosophy Today
- Social Science Quarterly
- Social Theory and Practice
- Socio-Economic Review
- South European Society and Politics
- Studies in American Political Development
- Survival
- Swiss Political Science Review

== T ==
- Telos
- Teorija in praksa
- Terrorism and Political Violence

== W ==
- West European Politics
- World Politics

== Y ==
- Yale Journal of International Affairs
