= South European Society and Politics =

- Discipline: Political science
- Language: English
- Edited by: Susannah Verney, Anna Bosco

Publication details
- History: 1996–present
- Publisher: Taylor & Francis
- Frequency: Quarterly
- Impact factor: 2.155 (2017)

Standard abbreviations
- ISO 4: South Eur. Soc. Politics

Indexing
- ISSN: 1360-8746 (print); 1743-9612 (web)
- LCCN: 97643311
- OCLC no.: 55041698

Links
- Journal homepage; Online access; Online archive

South European Society and Politics is a quarterly peer-reviewed academic journal in the social sciences, focusing on the region of Southern Europe. The journal covers both "old" and "new" Southern Europe, focusing on Cyprus, Greece, Italy, Malta, Portugal, Spain, and Turkey. The journal is published by Taylor and Francis and the editors-in-chief are Susannah Verney (National and Kapodistrian University of Athens) and Anna Bosco (University of Florence).

== Abstracting and indexing ==
The journal is abstracted and indexed in:

- CSA databases
- EBSCO databases
- GEOBASE
- International Bibliography of the Social Sciences
- Scopus
- Social Sciences Citation Index

According to the Journal Citation Reports, the journal has a 2017 impact factor of 2.155.

== See also ==
- List of political science journals
