= Isidro Morales Moreno =

Mexican professor of political science

Isidro Morales Moreno is a professor and researcher in political science as well as the director of Graduate School of Government and Public Policy (EGAP), State of Mexico Campus.

== Academia ==
Morales Moreno has a doctorate in international relations from the Institut d'Etudes Politiques in Paris, a Diplôme d'études approfondies (D.E.A.) in political science from the same institution and a bachelor's degree in international relations from the El Colegio de México.

Currently he is the director of Graduate School of Government and Public Policy (EGAP), State of Mexico Campus. Previous administrative positions include director of the International Relations and History department and dean of the School of Social Sciences (2001-2005) of the Universidad de las Américas Puebla, and director of the Graduate School of Government and Public Policy (EGAP) at Tecnológico de Monterrey, Campus Santa Fe.

== Research ==
Morales Moreno's main research areas include geopolitics and geo-economics of energy, trade and investment markets; the political economy of regional integration; Mexico-U.S. trade and security relations; and U.S.- Latin American relations. He has taught and done research work with institutions both in Mexico and abroad such as Energy Program and the Center of Economic Studies of the Colegio de México, Kluge Center of the Library of Congress in Washington. the University of Copenhagen, Danish Center for Development Research, the University of Gothenburg, the Center of Economic Development in Denmark, Watson Institute at Brown University and Center for North American Studies at American University. His research work has earned him Level II membership with the Sistema Nacional de Investigadores.

Dr. Morales has published extensively on energy, integration, trade-related and security topics, including Mexico's oil industry. He is currently Editor in Chief of Latin American Policy, a biannual journal distributed worldwide by Wiley-Blackwell, and President of Foreign Policy Edición Mexicana. He is also a member of the editorial board with Ashgate in England for its publication "The International Political Economy of New Regionalisms". He is the author of Post-NAFTA North America: Reshaping the Economic and Political Governance of a Changing Region, published by Palgrave/Macmillan (U.K), in 2008, and the editor of National Solutions to Trans-Border Problems?. The Governance of Security and Risk in a Post-NAFTA North America, published by Ashgate (U.K.) in March 2011.

== Organizations ==
In addition, Morales Moreno is a member of professional organizations such as International Studies Association, the Latin American Studies Association (LASA) and the Mexican Council for Foreign Affairs (COMEXI).

== See also ==
- List of Monterrey Institute of Technology and Higher Education faculty
