= George W. Downs (political scientist) =

American political scientist

George Woodrow Downs, Jr. (August 6, 1946 – January 21, 2015) was an American political scientist and pioneer of the application of noncooperative game theory to international politics. He was a professor of politics at New York University, where he served as chair of the political science department (1998–2001), Dean of Social Science (2001–2009), and later as the Bernhardt Denmark Professor of International Affairs. Before that, he had served as Boswell Professor of Peace and War at Princeton University from 1987 to 1998. He was elected a Fellow of the American Academy of Arts and Sciences (AAAS) in 2014. His books included The Search for Government Efficiency and Optimal Imperfection.

== Early life and education ==
Downs earned a Bachelor of Arts from Shimer College in 1967, graduating at the age of 20. Then as now, Shimer offered an early entrance program for high school sophomores and juniors. At Shimer, he roomed with David Rocke, with whom he would collaborate on several books and papers. In his senior year, the 6'3" Downs played as a guard on the Shimer Pioneers basketball team. After graduation, Downs served in the United States Air Force as a fighter pilot from 1967 to 1971.

Downs went on to earn a Ph.D. from the University of Michigan in 1976. At Michigan, he held fellowships including the Rackham Prize Fellowship, Russell Sage Foundation Fellowship, and NIMH Fellowship, and served in a number of leadership positions. His dissertation was titled "Bureaucracy, Innovation and Public Policy," and was also published in book form by Lexington Books.

== Academic and administrative career ==
Downs taught at the University of California, Davis from 1975 to 1987, as a professor in the department of political science. He then moved to Princeton, where he served as Boswell Professor of Peace and War in the Woodrow Wilson School of Public and International Affairs from 1987 to 1998. He also headed the Woodrow Wilson School's Ph.D. program from 1993 to 1997.

From there, Downs moved to New York University, where he served as chair of the Department of Politics from 1998 to 2001. He then rose to Dean of Social Science, serving in that capacity until 2009.

According to political scientist and Downs' colleague, Bruce Bueno de Mesquita, Downs was "the first scholar to use non-cooperative game theory to model the effects of domestic uncertainty on international negotiations and to identify how to use tacit bargaining ... to resolve disputes and arms races without coercion." He is also known for his work developing the theory of coordination goods.

Downs died of heart failure on January 21, 2015, shortly after falling asleep after watching the State of the Union Address.

== Honors ==
- Leonard D. White Award (1977)
- Youden Prize, American Society for Quality Control (1982)
- Louis Brownlow Book Award (1988)
- Fellow of the American Academy of Arts and Sciences (2014)

== Works ==
- Bureaucracy, Innovation, and Public Policy (1976) OCLC 67504394
- The Search for Government Efficiency: From Hubris to Helplessness (1986; coauthored with Patrick Larkey) ISBN 9780394352138
- Tacit Bargaining, Arms Races, and Arms Control (1990; coauthored with David Rocke) ISBN 0472064509
- Collective security beyond the Cold War (1994) ISBN 0472104578
- Optimal Imperfection? Domestic Uncertainty and Institutions in International Relations (1997; coauthored with David Rocke) ISBN 0691016259
