= World Medical & Health Policy =

- Discipline: Political Science
- Language: English
- Edited by: Daniel Skinner

Publication details
- History: 2009-present
- Publisher: Wiley-Blackwell on behalf of the Policy Studies Organization
- Frequency: Quarterly

Standard abbreviations
- ISO 4: World Med. Health Policy

Indexing
- ISSN: 1948-4682

Links
- Journal homepage; Online access; Online archive

World Medical & Health Policy is a quarterly e-only peer-reviewed academic journal published by Wiley-Blackwell on behalf of the Policy Studies Organization. The journal was established in 2009. The current editor-in-chief is the American health policy scholar Daniel Skinner of Ohio University's Heritage College of Osteopathic Medicine. The journal focuses on public health, public policy, the politics of medicine and health care. It aims to disseminate high quality research that has the potential of informing policy formation and improving health outcomes globally. The journal's editorial board has grown increasingly global over recent years, with a particular focus on Africa and Asia. In 2023 the journal received its first official impact factor of 4.1.
