= Meghna Sabharwal =

American scholar in public administration

Dr. Meghna Sabharwal
- Education: Acharya N. G. Ranga Agricultural University (BS) Arizona State University (MS, PhD)
- Occupations: Professor, researcher
- Employer: The University of Texas at Dallas
- Notable work: Editor of Review of Public Personnel Administration

Meghna Sabharwal is a professor of Public and Nonprofit Management and Associate Provost for Faculty Success at The University of Texas at Dallas.

== Education and career ==
Sabharwal attended Acharya N. G. Ranga Agricultural University, graduating in 1998 with a bachelor's degree in Agriculture Sciences. She went on to study at Arizona State University, earning a master's in Agribusiness and Resource Management as well as a doctorate in Public Administration.

As of 2026 Sabharwal is a professor at the University of Texas at Dallas. She is the Editor-in-Chief of the Review of Public Personnel Administration, an academic journal of public human resource management.

== Selected publications ==
- Sabharwal, Meghna; Berman, Evan M., eds. (2013). Public administration in South Asia: India, Bangladesh, and Pakistan. Boca Raton: CRC Press. ISBN 978-1-4398-6911-6.
- Sabharwal, Meghna (2014). "Is Diversity Management Sufficient? Organizational Inclusion to Further Performance". Public Personnel Management. 43 (2): 197–217. doi:10.1177/0091026014522202. ISSN 0091-0260.
- Sabharwal, M. (2015-04-01). "From Glass Ceiling to Glass Cliff: Women in Senior Executive Service". Journal of Public Administration Research and Theory. 25 (2): 399–426. doi:10.1093/jopart/mut030. ISSN 1053-1858.
- Sabharwal, Meghna (January 3, 2023), "Rising Gender Inequities: The Case of Authoritarian Patriarchy", Journal of Social Equity and Public Administration, 1 (1), University of Minnesota Libraries Publishing: 59–74, doi:10.24926/jsepa.v1i1.4929
- Berman, Evan M.; Van Wart, Montgomery R.; Sabharwal, Meghna (January 2026). Human Resource Management in Public Service: Paradoxes, Processes, and Problems (8th ed.). Sage Publishing. ISBN 9781071917886.

== Awards and honors ==
=== American Society for Public Administration (ASPA) ===
- Section for Women in Public Administration (SWPA)
  - 2025 Outstanding Mentorship Award
  - 2020 Dr. Rita Mae Kelly Distinguished Research Award
  - 2018 Marcia P. Crowley Service to the Section Award
- Section on International and Comparative Administration (SICA)
  - 2025 Jeanne-Marie Col Leadership Award
  - 2024 Garcia-Zamor Best Paper Award
- Section on Personnel Administration and Labor Relations (SPALR)
  - 2025 Outstanding Book in Public Sector Human Resource Management for Managing Diversity, Equity, and Inclusion in Public Service Organizations: A Liberatory Justice Approach
  - 2021 Jonathan P. West Outstanding Scholar Award
- LGBT Advocacy Alliance
  - 2019 Published Article Award for "Inclusive Work Practices: Turnover Intentions Among LGBT Employees of the U.S. Federal Government"

=== International Research Society for Public Management (IRSPM) ===
- 2023 Rosemary O'Leary Prize for Scholarship on Women in Public Administration

=== Network of Schools of Public Policy, Affairs, and Administration (NASPAA) ===
- 2022 William Duncombe Excellence in Doctoral Education Award
