= Review of Policy Research =

- Discipline: Political science
- Language: English
- Edited by: Nils C. Bandelow, Johanna Hornung

Publication details
- History: 1981–present
- Publisher: Wiley-Blackwell on behalf of the Policy Studies Organization
- Frequency: Bimonthly
- Impact factor: 2.328 (2021)

Standard abbreviations
- ISO 4: Rev. Policy Res.

Indexing
- CODEN: RPRECJ
- ISSN: 1541-132X (print); 1541-1338 (web)
- LCCN: 2002238762
- OCLC no.: 645281069

Links
- Journal homepage; Online access; Online archive

Review of Policy Research is a bimonthly peer-reviewed academic journal published by Wiley-Blackwell on behalf of the Policy Studies Organization. The journal was established in 1981 and the editors-in-chief are Nils C. Bandelow and Johanna Hornung (both at Technical University of Braunschweig). The journal covers theoretical approaches to public policy.

According to the Journal Citation Reports, the journal has a 2021 impact factor of 2.328, ranking it 77th out of 187 journals in the category "Political Science" and 31st out of 49 journals in the category "Public Administration".

== See also ==
- List of political science journals
- List of public administration journals
