= Latin American Policy =

- Discipline: Political science
- Language: English
- Edited by: Isidro Morales Moreno

Publication details
- History: 2010-present
- Publisher: Wiley-Blackwell on behalf of the Policy Studies Organization
- Frequency: Biannual

Standard abbreviations
- ISO 4: Lat. Am. Policy

Indexing
- ISSN: 2041-7365 (print); 2041-7373 (web)

Links
- Journal homepage; Online access; Online archive

Latin American Policy (LAP): A Journal of Politics and Governance in a Changing Region is a biannual peer-reviewed academic journal published by Wiley-Blackwell on behalf of the Policy Studies Organization and the Instituto Tecnológico de Estudios Superiores de Monterrey, Santa Fe. The journal was established in 2010 with editor-in-chief Isidro Morales Moreno (Tecnológico de Monterrey). The journal focuses on public policy and political science in Latin America.
