= Leonard D. White Award =

The Leonard D. White prize, supported by the University of Chicago is awarded yearly for the best dissertation in the field of public administration. It is named after historian Leonard D. White

== Winners ==
Year	Author (Institution)	Dissertation
2024	Sarah Rozenblum; Cornell University	Why Do Governments Ignore Their Own Experts? The Role of Scientific Advice in Covid-19 Vaccine Policy in France and the United States
2023	Kaylyn Jackson Schiff; Emory University	The Digital Citizen: The Impact of Technology on Public Participation and Government Responsiveness
2022	Sarah James; Harvard University	When is Hindsight 20/20? The Politics of Acknowledging and Revising Failed Policies
2021	Anthony DeMattee; Emory University	Domesticating Civil Society: How and Why Governments Use Laws to Regulate CSOs
2020	Angela Young-Shin Park; University of Kansas	Beyond Adoption: The Influence of Local Institutional Arrangements on Sustainability Policy Implementation and Management
2019	Chad Levinson; University of Chicago	Moral Subsidy: The Origins of Influential Extra-Governmental Organizations in US National Security Politics
2018	Jennifer Mei Jun Yim; University of Utah	Delinquency's Treatment: Why Interactions Produce Policy and Identity in Secure Juvenile Facilities
2017	Alan Zarychta; University of Colorado at Boulder	It Takes More Than a Village: Governance and Public Services in Developing Countries
2016	Bruce Jones; University of Texas, Dallas	An fMRI Study of the Reward Preferences of Government and Business Leaders
2015	Katharine Bradley; University of Michigan	Who Lobbies the Lobbyists? Bureaucratic Influence on State Medicaid Legislation
2014	Viridiana Rios; Harvard University	How Government Structure Encourages Criminal Violence: The causes of Mexico's Drug War
2011	Amanda M. Girth; American University	Accountability and Discretion in the Age of Contracting: When and Why Do Public Managers Implement Sanctions for Unsatisfactory Contract Performance?
2010	Mikhail Pryadilnikov; Harvard University	The State and Markets in Russia: Understanding the Development of Bureaucratic Implementation Capacities through the Study of Regulatory Reform, 2001–2008
2009	Zachary Oberfield; University of Wisconsin–Madison	Becoming the Man: How Street-Level Bureaucrats Develop Their Workplace Identities and Views
2008	Matthew Dull; University of Wisconsin	The Politics of Results: Comprehensive Reform and Institutional Choice
2007	Daniel W. Gingerich; Harvard University	Corruption in General Equilibrium: Political Institutions and Bureaucratic Performance in South America
2006	David Pitts; University of Georgia	Diversity, Representation and Performance: Evidence about Ethnicity in Public Organizations
2005	Sergio Fernandez; University of Georgia	Explaining Contracting Effectiveness: An Empirical Analysis of Contracting for Services among Local Governments
2004	Neal D. Woods (University of Kentucky) and Young Han Chun (University of Georgia)	Rethinking Regulation: Institutions and Interests in State Regulatory Enforcement and Goal Ambiguity in Public Organizations: Dimensions, Antecedents, and Comparisons
2003	No Award Given	Not Applicable
2002	Gregory Huber; Princeton University	Interests & Influence: Explaining Patterns of Enforcement in Government Regulation of Occupational Safety
2001	Jered Carr; Florida State University	The Political Economy of Local Government Boundary Change: State Laws, Local Actors and Collective Action
2000	William W. Newmann; University of Pittsburgh	The Pattern of Foreign Policy Decision Making: Developing an Evolutionary Model
1999	Mark Cassell; University of Wisconsin–Madison	Public Agencies in a Private World: A Comparison of the Federal Republic of Germany's Treuhandanstalt and the United States' Resolution Trust Corporation
1998	Craig W. Thomas; University of California, Berkeley	Bureaucratic Landscapes: Interagency Cooperation and the Preservation of Biodiversity
1997	Amy Zegart; Stanford University	In Whose Interest? The Making of American National Security Agencies
1996	Sally Coleman Selden; University of Georgia	Representative Bureaucracy: Examining the Potential for Administrative Responsiveness
1995	Robert C. Lieberman; Harvard University	Race and the Development of the American Welfare State from the New Deal to the Great Society
1994	Marissa Martino Golden; University of California, Berkeley	Bureaucratic Behavior in a Political Setting: Reactions to the Reagan Administration in Four Federal Agencies
1993	James Anthony Falk; University of Georgia	Explaining Infant Mortality: An Assessment of County Governments in Georgia
1992	Bartholomew H. Sparrow; University of Chicago	From the Outside In: The Effects of World War II on the American State
1991	Alan Abramson; Yale University	Responsive Budgeting: The Accommodation of Federal Budgeting to Different Programs and Spending Regimes
1990	Shui Yan Tang; Indiana University	Institutions and Collective Action in Irrigation Systems
1989	Roy T. Meyers; University of Michigan	Microbudgetary Strategies and Outcomes
1988	Chris C. Demchak; University of California, Berkeley	War, Technological Complexity, and the U.S. Army
1987	John DiIulio, Jr. Harvard University	Governing Prisons: A Comparative Study of Correctional Management
1986	Elisabeth Hollister Sims; University of California, Berkeley	Rural Development and Public Policy: Agricultural Institutions and Technological Change in the Indian and Pakistani Punjab
1985	Donald W. Chisholm; University of California, Berkeley	Informal Organization and the Problem of Coordination
1984	Rondal B. Hoskins; University of Georgia	Within-Year Appropriations Changes in Georgia State Government: The Implications for Budget Theory
1983	John Swain; Northern Illinois University	An Evaluation of the Public Choice Approach to Structuring Local Government in Metropolitan Areas
1982	Judith Gruber; Yale University	Democracy versus Bureaucracy: The Problem of Democratic Control
1981	J. Serge Taylor; University of California, Berkeley	Environmentalists in the Bureaucracy: Environmental Impact Analysis in the Forest Service and the Army Corps of Engineers
1980	John Edward Chubb; University of Minnesota	Interest Groups and the Bureaucracy: The Politics of Energy
1979	Daniel S. Metlay; University of California, Berkeley	Error Correction in Bureaucracy
1978	Frederic Allan Bergerson; Vanderbilt University	The Army Gets an Air Force: The Tactics and Process of Insurgent Bureaucratic Politics
1977	George Woodrow Downs, Jr. University of Michigan	Bureaucracy, Innovation and Public Policy
1976	Robert Rich; University of Chicago	An Investigation of Information Gathering and Handling in Seven Federal Bureaucracies: A Case Study of the Continuous National Survey
1975	Arnold Kanter; Yale University and Harry Kranz; American University	The Organizational Politics of National Security Policy: A Budgetary Perspective and A More Representative Bureaucracy: The Adequacy and Disability of Minority and Female Population Parity in Public Employment
1974	James Norris Danziger; Stanford University	Budget-Making and Expenditure Variations in English County Boroughs
1973	Douglas T. Yates, Jr. Yale University	Neighborhood Democracy: The Politics and Impacts of Decentralization
1972	Ezra N. Suleiman; Columbia University and Jessica Wolf; Yale University	Administration, Politics and the Higher Civil Service in France and Toward a Model of Inter-organizational Behavior: Two Case Studies in France
1971	Larry B. Hill; Tulane University	The International Transfer of Political Institutions: A Behavioral Analysis of the New Zealand Ombudsman
1970	Gary W. Wynia; University of Wisconsin, Madison	Policy and Bureaucracy in Center America: A Comparative Study
1969	Russell Murphy; Yale University	Policy Innovation and Political Strategy in an American City: The Formative Years of New Haven, Connecticut's Anti-Poverty Project
1968	Clyde D. McKee, Jr. University of Connecticut	The Politics of Council-Manager Forms Having and Not Having the Partisan Election
1967	John Patrick Crecine; Carnegie Institute of Technology	A Computer Simulation Model of Municipal Resource Allocation
1966	No award given	Not applicable
1965	No award given	Not applicable
1964	No award given	Not applicable
1963	Karl A. Hochschwender; Yale University	The Politics of Civil Service Reform in West Germany
1962	Simon D. Perry; Michigan State University	The Conflict of Expectations and Roles in Policy Science Behavior
1961	Laurin L. Henry; University of Chicago	Presidential Transitions
1960	Daniel J. Elazar; University of Chicago	Intergovernmental Relations in Nineteenth Century American Federalism
1959	Dean E. Mann; University of California, Berkeley	The Administration of Water Resources in the State of Arizona
