= Rita Mae Kelly =

American political scientist (1939–2001)

- Born: December 10, 1939
- Died: September 16, 2001 (aged 61)
- Education: University of Minnesota; Indiana University Bloomington
- Scientific career
- Fields: Political science
- Workplaces: American University; Rutgers University; Arizona State University; University of Texas at Dallas

Rita Mae Kelly (née Cawley; December 10, 1939 – September 16, 2001) was an American political scientist. She was a professor of political science at the University of Texas at Dallas, where she held the Andrew R. Cecil Endowed Chair in Applied Ethics. She was also the Dean of the School of Social Sciences at UT Dallas.

== Education and positions ==
Kelly attended the University of Minnesota, where she obtained a B.A. degree in Russian and history. She then graduated from Indiana University Bloomington with an M.A. degree, followed by a PhD. After completing her PhD, she became a researcher at American Institutes for Research, affiliated with American University. She then moved to Rutgers University, followed by Arizona State University and then the University of Texas at Dallas.

Kelly held a number of positions in academic administration. She was the Chair of the Department of Urban Studies and Community Development at Rutgers University, where she was also the Director of the Forum for Policy Research and Public Service. At Arizona State University, she was the Chair of the Justice Studies Department. At the University of Texas at Dallas, she was both Dean of the College of Social Sciences, and the founding Director of the Center for Empowerment and Global-Local Equity.

Kelly was the 1988–1989 President of the Policy Studies Organization, and in that same year was the President of the Western Political Science Association.

== Research ==
In addition to journal articles and chapters in edited volumes, Kelly was either an author or editor of more than a dozen books. Her research was concerned with understanding gender inequalities in public policy and political and economic structures. For example, in 1991 she published the book The Gendered Economy: Work, Careers, and Success, which is a study of the place of women in the economy of the United States, with a particular focus on the economy of Arizona. In 1995, Kelly co-edited Gender Power, Leadership, and Governance with Georgia Duerst-Lahti. This book is an edited collection of work on the gender imbalances in leadership and governance, studying how imbalances in power by gender have been encoded into political institutions, and how those institutions then reinforce differentials in political power by gender. By studying the exclusionary mechanisms of political institutions, the work in Gender power was noted for having concrete implications for women in government.

Kelly was given an Honorary Doctorate in Political Science by Umeå University. In 1991, the American Society for Public Administration awarded Kelly the Distinguished Research Award for Research on Women in Public Administration. In 1992, she won the Aaron Wildavsky Award from the Policy Studies Organization for the best book on policy studies. She also received the 1995 Merriam Mills Award from the Policy Studies Organization. Kelly won the Outstanding Mentor Award from the Women's Caucus for Political Science in the American Political Science Association in both 1991 and 1996. She served on numerous journal editorial boards, and was the chief editor of the Journal of Women, Politics & Policy from 1987 to 1992.

Kelly died in 2001. The Rita Mae Kelly Fund for research was established in her honor by the American Political Science Association.

== Selected works ==
- — (1991). The Gendered Economy: Work, Careers, and Success. SAGE Publications. ISBN 978-0-8039-4216-5.
- —; et al. (1991). "Public Managers in the States: A Comparison of Career Advancement by Sex". Public Administration Review. 51 (5). Wiley: 402–412. doi:10.2307/976409. JSTOR 976409.
- —; Georgia Duerst-Lahti, eds. (1995). Gender Power, Leadership, and Governance. University of Michigan Press. ISBN 978-0-472-06610-0.
- — (1998). "An Inclusive Democratic Polity, Representative Bureaucracies, and the New Public Management". Public Administration Review. 58 (3). Wiley: 201–208. doi:10.2307/976560. JSTOR 976560.
- —; Meredith Newman (2001). "The Gendered Bureaucracy". Women & Politics. 22 (3). Routledge: 1–33. doi:10.1300/J014v22n03_01. S2CID 152374222.

== Selected awards ==
- Honorary Doctorate in Political Science, Umeå University
- Distinguished Research Award for Research on Women in Public Administration, American Society for Public Administration (1991)
- Aaron Wildavsky Award, Policy Studies Organization (1992)
- Merriam Mills Award, Policy Studies Organization (1995)
