= Harry van der Linden =

American philosopher

Education
- Education: Washington University in St. Louis (PhD), State University of Groningen (MA), State University of Utrecht (BS)
- Thesis: Kantian Ethics and Socialism (1985)
- Doctoral advisor: Steven Schwarzschild

Harry van der Linden is a Dutch philosopher and Emeritus Professor of Philosophy at Butler University. He is known for his works on Kantian ethics and is the editor of Radical Philosophy Review.

== Works ==
- Kantian Ethics and Socialism, Hackett Publishing Company 1988
