= Renetta Garrison Tull =

American electrical engineer

- Born: Philadelphia, Pennsylvania U.S.
- Education: Howard University; Northwestern University
- Known for: The "Jessica Effect" to prevent domestic violence towards women in STEM
- Awards: 2017 Invited Keynote speaker at the UNESCO 61st Edition of the Commission on the Status of Women; 2016 Claire L. Felbinger Award for Diversity and Inclusion by the Accreditation Board for Engineering and Technology; 2015 The Global Engineering Deans Council Airbus Diversity Award Finalist
- Scientific career
- Fields: Engineering, diversity and inclusion policy
- Workplaces: University of California, Davis

Renetta Garrison Tull is an American electrical engineer, global policy strategist, and works to advance diversity and inclusion in science, technology, engineering, and mathematics (STEM). Tull is the inaugural Vice Chancellor of Inclusive Excellence at University of California, Davis and a founding Director of the National Science Foundation funded program PROMISE: Alliances for Graduate Education and Professoriate, which aims to increase the number of underrepresented students in STEM. Tull previously served as Vice Provost for Strategic Initiatives at the University of Maryland, Baltimore County (UMBC) and was also the Director of Graduate and Professional Pipeline Development for the University System of Maryland (USM) where she also served as the co-Principal Investigator and co-director of the Louis Stokes Alliance for Minority Participation. On a global scale, Tull was selected as the keynote speaker for the United Nations Educational, Scientific and Cultural Organization (UNESCO) event on the Commission on the Status of Women in Engineering Fields, and was the only American and only female finalist for the Global Engineering Deans Council Airbus Diversity Award in 2015.

== Early life and education ==
Tull grew up in Plainfield, New Jersey and was interested in medicine and science from a young age. Her father inspired her to pursue passions in science, despite the obstacles Black people face in pursuing STEM careers, and he gave her confidence that she could succeed. Following her interest in science, Tull attended Howard University, a historically Black university, in 1987 and pursued her undergraduate education in Electrical Engineering. She focused her degree in Signal Processing and graduated with her Bachelors of Science in Electrical Engineering in 1991.

After completing her undergraduate degree, Tull pursued her Masters of Science in Electrical Engineering at Northwestern University, focusing in Speech Signal Processing. After completing her master's degree in 1994, Tull stayed at Northwestern to complete her PhD in Speech Science, with a focus in exploring disability access to technology.

Tull completed her PhD in 1999 and then pursued a short postdoctoral fellowship studying Vocal Physiology at the University of Wisconsin-Madison in 1999 before becoming a Research Assistant and then Research Associate developing novel technologies to aid people with disabilities.

== Career and research ==
From 2000 to 2001, Tull was an assistant professor at the University of Wisconsin-Madison in the Department of Communication Sciences and Disorders where she focused on technology development for persons with disabilities.

In 2003, Tull was adjunct faculty at the University of Maryland, College Park in the Department of Hearing and Speech Sciences while at the same time becoming the Founding Director of the National Science Foundation funded PROMISE: Maryland's Alliance for Graduate Education and Professoriate (AGEP) at the University of Maryland, Baltimore County. She held the position of Director and Co-Principal Investigator of PROMISE until 2019. In 2005, Tull became the Director and Co-Principal Investigator of the Louis Stokes Alliance for Minority Participation (LSAMP) Bridge to Doctorate Program which aims to increase the representation of minority students in STEM graduate program and careers down the line. In 2007, Tull became the Assistant Dean for Graduate Student Development at University of Maryland Baltimore County. In 2016, Tull was appointed to Special Assistant to the Senior Vice Chancellor in the University System of Maryland as well as the Director for Graduate and Professional Pipeline Development. Finally in 2017, Tull was appointed Professor of Practice in the College of Engineering and Information technology as well as the Associate Vice Provost for Strategic Innovation at the UMBC.

In 2019, Tull was recruited to the University of California, Davis to become the Inaugural Vice Chancellor for Inclusive Excellence. As Vice Chancellor, Tull uses her expertise in recruiting and retaining a diverse student body by fostering the development of underrepresented students in STEM.

=== NSF funded diversity program leadership ===
Tull became the founding Director and Co-Principal investigator of the National Science Foundation funded program called PROMISE. She was recognized for her efforts in sustaining and developing this program by The Global Engineering Deans Council and The Airbus Group in 2015. She was the only American and the only female finalist of the 2015 GEDC Airbus Diversity Award and was selected to speak in Australia about the advancements and progress she had made as Director of the PROMISE program. In addition to PROMISE, Tull also Directed and was the Co-Principal Investigator of the NSF funded Louis Stokes Alliance for Minority Participation in the University System of Maryland. This Bridge to Doctorate Fellows program provides fellowships and professional development workshops and resources to underrepresented students pursuing STEM careers and Tull was instrumental in bringing funding to the program and becoming a role model for students across North America.

=== The Jessica Effect ===
Through her leadership and mentorship roles, Tull recruited many underrepresented women in STEM and set them on trajectories to advance in their STEM careers. One of her students and mentees, the late Jessica Soto Perez of Puerto Rico, was killed by her husband and this prompted Tull to advocate for awareness of signs of domestic violence in women in STEM and to push the involvement of family and friends into the lives of students in her NSF funded diversity and recruitment programs. Tull coined the term the “Jessica Alert” which she first discussed with women in STEM at a conference in Puerto Rico to emphasize the need to maintain acute awareness of the wellbeing of young women in STEM and the reality of domestic violence in their mentees and colleagues. Tull also coined the term the “Jessica Effect” which describes the need for involvement of friends and family in the careers, milestones, events of students in her STEM recruitment programs. By involving family and friends and inviting them to events through PROMISE and LSAMP, she ensures that families are connected to the wellbeing and goals of students and reduces isolation and potential for domestic violence. Tull's work on the Jessica Effect was published in the Association of American Colleges and Universities and was discussed at The Atlantic event “A New America: Empowering Hispanic Millennials for Tech Leadership” in 2014. Tull continued to work with students in Puerto Rico and co-led the ADVANCE Hispanic Women in STEM was vice president of initiatives for the Latin and Caribbean Consortium for Engineering Institutions.

=== Public Health Crisis Response ===
Tull organized and spoke at the University of California Davis Community Moment of Silence in June 2020 after the police murder of George Floyd. She emphasized the reality that these acts of violence and racism are not new, recounting her own experiences being stopped by police for no reason while in the car with her father. Tull's call to action was featured in the Sacramento Magazine in June, 2020. Tull is now also the co-chair of the task force at UC Davis that is restructuring the way campus safety is practiced going beyond policing and towards incorporating social work and mental health resources and support.

== Awards and honors ==
- 2017-2019 Invited Member for the NASEM Committee on Effective Mentoring Programs and Practices in Science, Technology, Engineering, Mathematics, and Medicine
- 2017 Invited Keynote speaker at the UNESCO 61st Edition of the Commission on the Status of Women (CSW)
- 2016 Claire L. Felbinger Award for Diversity and Inclusion by the Accreditation Board for Engineering and Technology
- 2015 The Global Engineering Deans Council (GEDC) Airbus Diversity Award Finalist - international award that recognizes initiatives aiming to increase diverse participation in engineering
- 2008 Library of Congress as the National GEM Consortium's University Member of the Year

== Select media ==
- 2019 Featured in the Daily Democrat “New vice chancellor diversity and equity named at UC Davis”
- 2018 Featured in U.S. News STEM Solutions Presents “Workforce of Tomorrow - Renetta G. Tull, Ph.D.”
- 2017 Featured on Foreign Policy News “Renetta Tull of UMBC invited to address UNESCO Initiative on Women in Engineering”
- 2016 Featured in Scientific American “Global Engineering Deans Council announces Airbus Diversity Award”
- 2016 Featured in The Christian Science Monitor “How can universities keep minorities in STEM graduate programs?”
- 2016 Featured in Medium Article by Sci Chic “Women in Science You Should Be Following On Social Media”
- 2008 Featured on the public radio show “The Best of Our Knowledge” discussing methods to increase the number of Black women earning Ph.D.’s in the sciences

== Select publications ==
- W.Y. Carter, R.G. Tull, J.C. Rutledge and L.N. Joseph, “The Dissertation House Model: Doctoral Student Experiences Coping and Writing in a Shared Knowledge Community.” CBE: Life Sciences Education, 15:ar34, Fall 2016.
- Tull, R. G., Medina, H., Pearlman, J., & Goldberg, M. R. (2013). An Emerging Impact from an Engineering Education Outreach Collaborative “Bridge” Program: Graduate Student Participation in Wheelchair Mobility Research for Mexico. #RP207, Proceedings of the Eleventh LACCEI Latin American and Caribbean Conference for Engineering and Technology (LACCEI’2013) “Innovation in Engineering, Technology and Education for Competitiveness and Prosperity,” August 14 – 16, 2013, Cancun, Mexico.
- Carter-Johnson, F. D., Ordóñez Rozo, P., Tull, R. G., and Nino, M. (2013). Examining the Intersection of Graduate Student Funding, Mentoring, and Training as a Mechanism of Success for Peer Mentors and their Mentees, paper ID#7626. 120th Annual Conference of the American Association of Engineering Education, Atlanta: ASEE
- Tull, R. G. (2013, Spring) Optimize Your Summer Research Experience. SHPE – Magazine of the Society of Hispanic Professional Engineers. Vol. 15., No. 2. p. 20.
- Imler, C. and Tull, R. (2012, November 30). Stem Tide of Grad Student Losses. The Daily Record (Baltimore, Md.), p. 19.
- Tull, R. G., Rutledge, J.C., Warnick, J. W., and Carter, F. D. (2012). PROMISE: Maryland's Alliance for Graduate Education and the Professoriate Enhances Recruitment and Retention of Underrepresented Minority Graduate Students. Academic Medicine, 87(11), p. 1562-1569.
- Tull, R. G., and Tull, D. L. (2012, September). A Formula for Success. Optics and Photonic News.
- Tull, R. G., Nino, M. and Ramoutar, N. (2012). Preparing for Engineering and Other STEM Graduate/Post-Graduate Masters and Doctoral Programs. Proceedings of the Tenth LACCEI Latin American and Caribbean Conference (LACCEI 2012), Megaprojects: Building Infrastructure by fostering engineering collaboration, efficient and effective integration and innovative planning, July 23–27, 2012, Panama City, Panama.
- A. M. Reed and R. G. Tull (2012). Reducing the Bottleneck: Breaking the Bottle! Addressing the Recruitment of Postdocs through Best Practices of AGEP and ADVANCE Horizons Programs. Proceedings of WEPAN 2012, Columbus, OH.
- Rutledge, J.C., Carter-Veale, W.Y. & Tull, R. G. (2011). Successful PhD Pathways to Advanced STEM Careers for Black Women in Beyond Stock Stories and Folktales: African Americans‟ Paths to STEM Fields, Vol. 11., H. T. Frierson and W. F. Tate, Eds. United Kingdom: Emerald Group Publishing Ltd.
- Tull, R. G. (2009, Fall). The ‘Imposter Syndrome’ and How to Avoid it. SHPE Magazine – The Official Magazine of the Society of Hispanic Professional Engineers, Vol. 11, No. 3.
