= Contemporary Japan =

Japanese English-language magazine

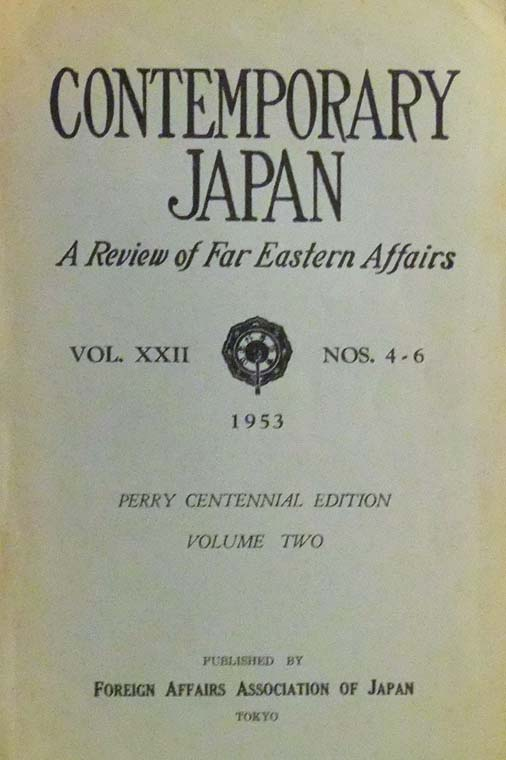
- Categories: Japanese politics, Foreign affairs
- Frequency: Quarterly
- Publisher: Foreign Affairs Association of Japan
- First issue: June 1932
- Final issue Number: March 1970 volume XXIX number 2
- Country: Japan
- Based in: Tokyo
- Language: English

Contemporary Japan: A Review of Far Eastern Affairs was a quarterly Japanese English-language magazine published between 1932 and 1970 by the Foreign Affairs Association of Japan.

Though independently published, throughout its existence the magazine had close ties with the Japanese government. It was described by John W. Dower as "a valuable semi-official Japanese publication".

== Origin and content ==
Contemporary Japan was the flagship publication of the Foreign Affairs Association of Japan, an organization founded in October 1931 by Japanese politicians and intellectuals seeking to promote awareness in foreign countries about Japanese affairs. The editorial preface of the first issue explained the magazine's aim "to know and to make known what is going on in Japan and in the minds of the Japanese."

The bulk of each issue consisted of translations into English of the articles and speeches of Japanese writers, scholars, and politicians. The first issue, for instance, included contributions from Hakucho Masamune, Taketora Ogata, Yamamoto Jōtarō, and Sakutaro Tachi who was also one of its editors. The launch of the periodical was praised by the Financial Times "for the good work it will do in the propagation of a better knowledge of the nation" at a time when Japan's relations with the outside world were "increasingly complicated".

In June 1932 the magazine could be purchased for 1 yen and 50 sen per issue, but by 1970 the price per issue had risen to 1,500 yen.

=== Links with the Japanese government ===
The Foreign Affairs Association of Japan which published Contemporary Japan had links with the Japanese government. In 1932 its administrative council included such figures as Lord Keeper of the Privy Seal Nobuaki Makino, former prime minister Kosai Uchida, future prime minister Fumimaro Konoe, and former foreign ministers Kijūrō Shidehara and Kikujiro Ishii. Though the magazine's first issue stressed that it had "no party affiliations, political or otherwise" and sought "to obtain as many representative opinions as possible", it also opened with a special message from Foreign Minister Kenkichi Yoshizawa, which was stridently defensive of Japan's conduct in Manchuria and Shanghai. The periodical later explained that "on controversial subjects, where national viewpoints are in conflict, it can be taken for granted that our contributors will defend, expound, and do their utmost to propagate, the Japanese view".

During the 1930s and 1940s Contemporary Japan was strongly supportive of Japanese imperialism and expansionism in China and after its formation the Cabinet Information Bureau, the official propaganda arm of the Imperial Japanese government, supported the magazine. Because of this its parent body, the Foreign Affairs Association of Japan, officially registered itself in the United States on November 29, 1938 as being an agent of the Japanese government.

== End of the magazine ==
Though Contemporary Japan continued to be produced during World War II and for decades after, publication abruptly ceased with volume 29 number 2 which was released in March 1970.

== See also ==
- Japan Echo - a magazine with a similar theme
