= Sakutaro Tachi =

Japanese lawyer

Sakutaro Tachi (立 作太郎, Tachi Sakutarō, 1874–1943) was a Japanese expert on international law.

Studied law at Tokyo Imperial University, and graduated in 1897. In 1900–04 studied law in Europe. In 1904 became professor of law at Tokyo Imperial University.

In 1919 served as member of the Commission of Responsibilities, which dealt with the issue of war crimes. In 1921–22 served as member of the Japanese delegation to the Washington naval conference.

He opposed the idea to outlaw war in the Kellogg–Briand Pact, arguing the idea was unrealistic. From 1931 onward, justified Japanese policy in north-China as self-defense relating to Japanese interests. Regarding the mandates system under the League of Nations, held the view that the mandatory power had total sovereignty over the mandate territory.

== Works (partial list) ==
- La Souveraineté et l'Independance de l'État et les Questions intérieures en Droit International (Paris, Les Éditions Internationales, 1930)
- The Principle of the Open Door in China and Manchoukuo (Tokyo: The Foreign Affairs Association of Japan, 1937)
- "Pearl Harbour Raid and Roberts Report" Contemporary Japan: A Review of East Asiatic Affairs, vol. XII, No. 4 (April, 1943), pp. 417–425
