= Joint University Council of the Applied Social Sciences =

Joint University Council (JUC)
- Formation: 1918
- Type: Learned society
- Location: United Kingdom
- Official language: English
- Chair: Dr Ian C. Elliott
- Vice-Chair: Dr Janet Melville-Wiseman
- Website: www.juc.ac.uk

The Joint University Council of Applied Social Sciences (JUC) is the UK learned society for public and social administration. The JUC was founded at a meeting at London School of Economics in 1918. A complete history of the JUC was written by Professor Richard Chapman in 2007.

As a representative body, the JUC is composed of institutional members from across Higher Education. It is constituted of three sub-committees: the JUC Executive Committee, the Public Administration Committee (PAC) and the Social Work Education Committee (SWEC).

== JUC Executive Committee ==
The JUC Executive Committee is constituted of the trustees of the learned society. This includes representatives from both PAC and SWEC as well as the JUC Treasurer, JUC Secretary, JUC Chair and JUC Vice-chair.

=== Former JUC Chairs ===
2014-2017 Professor Joyce Liddle

2017-2021 Professor Samantha Baron

2021–Present Dr Ian C. Elliott

== Public Administration Committee ==
The Public Administration Committee (PAC) represents scholarship in public administration and public management within the UK. The PAC publish two academic journals in association with Sage: Public Policy and Administration and Teaching Public Administration.

As well as publishing two academic journals the PAC provides funding for small research projects and seminars series.

=== Former PAC Chairs ===
1977-1981 Professor Richard Chapman

1981-1983 Professor Howard Elcock

1984-1986 Professor Chris Bellamy

1996-1998 Professor Rod Rhodes

1999-2002 Professor Andrew Gray

2002-2004 Professor Grant Jordan

2005-2007 Professor Barry O’Toole

2008-2010 Professor Martin Laffin

2011-2013 Professor Joyce Liddle

2014-2016 Professor Kerry Howell

2017–2021 Dr Ian C. Elliott

2021–present Dr Karin Bottom

== Social Work Education Committee ==
The Social Work Education Committee (SWEC) represents UK schools of social work at the international level. SWEC has previously participated in reviews of social work in both England and Scotland. The committee is routinely consulted by national bodies- including regulatory authorities, research councils, and government departments- on matters related to social work education and research. SWEC work closely with a wide range of national and international organisations, such as Social Work England, the Social Care Institute for Excellence (SCIE), the European Social Work Research Association (ESWRA) and the International Federation of Social Work (IFSW) and the International Association of Schools of Social Work (IASSW).

== Fellows ==
The JUC may confer the honorary title of Fellow of the JUC on academics within public and social administration who are held in high esteem by their peers and who have made an outstanding contribution to the learned society. They are nominated and the nominations are then subject to peer review. Fellows are entitled to use the letters "FJUC" after their name.

The full list of JUC Fellows are as follows:

- Professor Peter Kaim-Caudle
- Professor A T Collis
- David Gladstone
- Professor Sonia Jackson
- S R Pierce
- Professor Joan Orme
- Professor A Dunsire
- Mr Ivor Shelley OBE
- Professor Richard Chapman
- Professor H Elcock
- Professor Gavin Drewry
- Professor Sylvia Horton
- Professor John Veit-Wilson (nominated 2003)
- Professor C Bellamy (nominated 2003)
- Professor Adrian Sinfield (nominated 2004)
- Jackie Powell (nominated 2009)
- Professor Peter Barberis (nominated 2009)
- Michael Preston-Shoot (nominated 2010)
- Professor Jonathan Parker (nominated 2011)
- Professor David Stanley (nominated 2013)
- Professor Andrew Gray (nominated 2013)
- Professor Andrew Massey (nominated 2013)
- Barry O’Toole (nominated 2013)
- Michael Hunt (nominated 2013)
- Professor David Wilson (nominated 2014)
- Professor Martin Laffin (nominated 2014)
- Professor Hilary Tompsett (nominated 2015)
- Professor John Diamond (nominated 2017)
- Professor John Fenwick (nominated 2017)
- Professor Joyce Liddle (nominated 2017)
- Professor Peter Murphy (nominated 2020)
- Dr Mike Rowe (nominated 2020)
- Professor Paul Carmichael (nominated 2020)
- Professor Claire Dunlop (nominated 2020)
- Professor Edoardo Ongaro (nominated 2020)
- Dr Keith Baker (nominated 2020)
