= Royal Institute of Public Administration =

UK think tank

- Abbreviation: RIPA
- Formation: 1922
- Dissolved: 1992
- Location(s): United Kingdom and overseas
- Formerly called: Institute of Public Administration

The Royal Institute of Public Administration (RIPA) was a British professional public service institution and civil service training organisation that operated in the United Kingdom and overseas from its founding in 1922 to its closure in 1992. Today, its international training and consulting activities continue with Public Administration International Ltd. and RIPA International Ltd.

== Founding and early years ==
Founded as the Institute of Public Administration, its mandate was to improve public administration through training, research and the enhancement of professional practice. It was established in 1922 through the Society of Civil Servants with Viscount Haldane as the first President.

British statesman Sir William Beveridge envisioned it as a place where: "Civil Servants may meet regularly to make a national pool of their ideas, to work out techniques of administration, by discussion and papers and so on; to educate themselves and incidentally the public as to what the Civil Service is and does." Membership was open to individual public servants and regional groups were developed at home and overseas.

In 1923, the Institute founded the academic journal Public Administration – the first of its kind. Devised to be "a medium both for instruction and enlightenment", it remains a top-ranked publication in its field.

Toward the end of the 1920s, the Institute engaged in discussions with academia to deepen its connection with higher learning, and in 1929 the Diploma of Public Administration was established as a joint venture with the University of London.

== Establishment of Regional Groups ==
Australian Regional Groups of the Institute were progressively established from 1927. The South Australian Regional Group was formed on 28 October 1927 at The Grosvenor Hotel in Adelaide. A Victorian Regional Group formed in 1929, New South Wales in 1935 and Australian Capital Territory in 1943. A Queensland Regional Group was formed in 1951, closed in 2012, and re-launched in 2017. A Papua and New Guinea Regional Groups was formed in 1952 and closed in 1968. Regional Groups began in Tasmania in 1953 and Western Australia in 1954. The last Regional Group formed in the Northern Territory in 1954 and closed in 1968).

A plebiscite of members of the Australian Regional Groups was held in 1977 to get their views on the possibility of revising constitutional arrangements with the Royal Institute of Public Administration. A clear majority of members voted in favour of a proposal to form an autonomous Australian Institute of Public Administration.

On 1 January 1980 ties between the former Australian Regional Groups were cut with the Royal Institute of Public Administration and the Australian Institute of Public Administration came into being (a precursor to the current Institute of Public Administration Australia).

== Acquiring Royal Charter ==
The Institute developed considerably under the directorship of Raymond Nottage from 1949. Trust status was achieved in 1950, and corporate membership was introduced, attracting many local authorities and other organisations, thus increasing the resources available through subscriptions. The Royal Charter was awarded in 1954.

== Organisation Development ==
In 1953, the Institute began providing short-term management courses for public sector managers and officials. This was done in order to directly integrate the latest best practice and management tools into public administration by filling the gap between on-the-job training and Diplomas of Public Administration.

An Operational Research Unit for Local Government was established in 1966, based at Reading, followed by a similar service for the National Health Service. Following a 1972 review, UK Training Services and Membership Services were separated from overseas training and development. The Overseas Services Unit (OSU) later known as the International Division, was formed and expanded to undertake major international training and civil service development projects, many under Overseas Development Administration funding.

At its peak the Institute employed over 100 staff.

== International activities ==
International interest in its work had increased continuously since 1961, when RIPA had started its capacity building work with officials from developing countries. By the 1980s, the Institute's international training activities were widely known and appreciated. Major training and consulting contracts were implemented across Africa and Asia.

The reasons for OSU's success were many and included its range of intellectual connections with public administration issues across the globe. For instance in 1963, Deputy Director John Sargent became a member of the Governing Board of the Institute of Administration in Ife, Nigeria. In 1972 Public Administration, RIPA's journal, had more than 10,000 subscribers in over 95 different countries. OSU's consulting staff provided specialist expertise in public sector organisation and methods, human resource development and related fields.

In the 1970s the Overseas Development Administration established the academic Journal of Administration Overseas subsequently renamed Public Administration and Development which was taken over by RIPA. The journal, which is now published by Wiley, reports, reviews and assesses the practice of public administration in less industrialised economies and remains highly ranked today.

== Closure ==
In 1992, against a difficult economic background including public expenditure cuts, RIPA experienced severe financial difficulties, and negotiations were initiated to dispose of the International Division as a viable commercial enterprise. Two new companies were formed by the International Division's staff. Public Administration International Ltd (PAI) which was incorporated on 14 February 1992, continues to operate as an independent company providing international consulting services and study programmes. The International Division was acquired by Capita Group plc. The Institute itself was wound up.

== See also ==
Institute for Government

Joint University Council of the Applied Social Sciences
