= Radical Philosophy Review =

- Discipline: Philosophy
- Language: English
- Edited by: Harry van der Linden

Publication details
- History: 1998–present
- Publisher: Philosophy Documentation Center (United States)
- Frequency: Biannual

Standard abbreviations
- ISO 4: Radic. Philos. Rev.

Indexing
- ISSN: 1388-4441 (print); 1569-1659 (web)
- LCCN: sn99-44002
- OCLC no.: 40662036

Links
- Journal homepage; Online access

The Radical Philosophy Review is a peer-reviewed academic journal sponsored by the Radical Philosophy Association. It was established in 1998 and all issues are available online. The journal is published by the Philosophy Documentation Center.

== Content ==
The Radical Philosophy Review contains articles focusing on the discussion of fundamental social change. It promotes the idea that society should be built on cooperation rather than competition, and that social decision-making should be governed by democratic procedures.

On occasion, the journal publishes special issues or special sections focusing on a particular social or political issue. Past topics include NATO's war in Yugoslavia, the Second Intifada, radical theories and religion, and biopolitics and racism.

== Notable contributors ==
- Samir Amin
- Giovanni Arrighi
- Hanan Ashrawi
- Noam Chomsky
- Ward Churchill
- Angela Davis
- Enrique Dussel
- Norman Finkelstein
- Henry Giroux
- Mumia Abu-Jamal
- Edward Said

== Abstracting and indexing ==
The journal is abstracted and indexed in Academic Search Premier, Alternative Press Index, Current Abstracts, Humanities International Index, International Bibliography of Book Reviews of Scholarly Literature, International Bibliography of Periodical Literature, International Bibliography of the Social Sciences, MLA International Bibliography, Philosopher's Index, PhilPapers, SocINDEX, and TOC Premier.

== See also ==
- Anti-capitalism
- Anti-Zionism
- Critical pedagogy
- Democratic socialism
- Far-left politics
- Identity politics
- List of philosophy journals
- List of political science journals
- Marxian economics
- Neo-Marxism
- Political radicalism
- Social anarchism
