= Robert C. Lieberman =

American political scientist (born 1964)

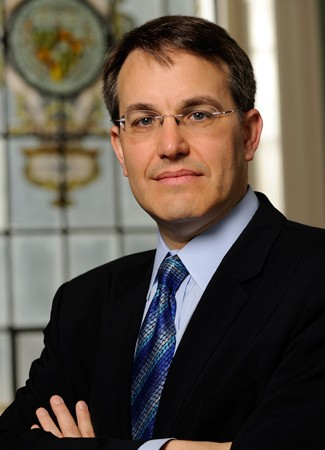
- Born: September 26, 1964 (age 62); Boston, Massachusetts, U.S.

Academic background
- Education: Yale University; Harvard University

Academic work
- Discipline: American politics Political science
- Institutions: Johns Hopkins University (current); Columbia University

Robert C. Lieberman (born September 26, 1964) is an American political scientist and the former provost of the Johns Hopkins University. A scholar of American political development, Lieberman focuses primarily on race and politics and the American welfare state.

== Biography ==
Robert Charles Lieberman was born in Boston, Massachusetts, in 1964. He received his B.A. degree from Yale University in 1986 and his Ph.D. from Harvard University in 1994. From 1994 to 2013 he taught at Columbia University, where he served as chairman of the international and public affairs department from 2007 to 2012 and interim dean of the School of International and Public Affairs (SIPA) from 2012 to 2013. He was instrumental in recruiting leading faculty to SIPA, restructuring the curriculum, and convening an international conference on the future of global public policy education.

In 2013, he was named the 14th provost of Johns Hopkins University, concurrently joining the faculty of the department of Political Science at the Johns Hopkins Zanvyl Krieger School of Arts & Sciences on July 1, 2013. In this role, Lieberman was responsible for "promoting and coordinating the university’s teaching and research mission" across the university's nine academic divisions. He also had oversight for research at a university that for thirty-five years has led the country in higher education research spending. In August 2016 he stepped down as provost and was appointed Krieger-Eisenhower Professor in the Johns Hopkins Department of Political Science. He now lives in Baltimore, Maryland in the Roland Park neighborhood with his family. His wife is Lauren Osborne, and their children include a son Benjamin and twins, Martha and Aaron.

== Research ==
Lieberman has written extensively on American political development, social welfare policy, issues of race and politics in America, institutional racism, and the welfare state. He has received support from the National Science Foundation, Russell Sage Foundation, the German Marshall Fund, and the American Philosophical Society, and awards such as the American Political Science Association’s Leonard D. White Award, the Social Science History Association’s President’s Book Award, Harvard University Press’s Thomas J. Wilson Prize, and Columbia University’s Lionel Trilling Book Award.

Books

- 1998, Shifting the Color Line: Race and the American Welfare State. Harvard University Press.
- 2005, Shaping Race Policy: The United States in Comparative Perspective. Princeton University Press. Winner of the 2006 Best Book on Public Policy Award, Race, Ethnicity and Politics Section of the American Political Science Association
- 2009, Democratization in America: A Comparative-Historical Analysis. with Desmond King, Gretchen Ritter, and Laurence Whitehead, Johns Hopkins University Press.
- 2013, "Beyond Discrimination: Racial Inequality in a Postracist Era," with Fredrick C. Harris
- 2016, "The Oxford Handbook of American Political Development," with Richard M. Valelly and Suzanne Mettler

Highly Cited Articles

- 2000, with Greg M. Shaw, Looking inward, looking outward: The politics of state welfare innovation under devolution, in: Political Research Quarterly. Vol. 53, nº 2, 215–240.
- 2001, with John S. Lapinski, American federalism, race and the administration of welfare, in: British Journal of Political Science. Vol. 31, nº 2, 303–329.
- 2002, "Ideas, institutions, and political order: Explaining political change", in: American Political Science Review. Vol. 96, nº 4, 697–712.
- 2002, Weak state, strong policy: Paradoxes of race policy in the United States, Great Britain, and France, in: Studies in American Political Development. Vol. 16, nº 2, 138–161.
- 2009, with Desmond King, Ironies of state building: A comparative perspective on the American state, in: World Politics. Vol. 61, nº 3, 547–588.
- 2015, with Fredrick C. Harris, Racial Inequality After Racism: How Institutions Hold Back African Americans, in: Foreign Affairs. Vol 94, nº 2.
