= The International Journal of Press/Politics =

Academic journal

- Discipline: Political science and Journalism
- Language: English
- Edited by: Cristian Vaccari

Publication details
- Former name: Harvard International Journal of Press/Politics
- History: 1996–present
- Publisher: SAGE Publishing
- Frequency: Quarterly
- Impact factor: 6.592 (2020)

Standard abbreviations
- ISO 4: Int. J. Press/Politics

Indexing
- ISSN: 1940-1612 (print); 1940-1620 (web)
- LCCN: 2007213329
- OCLC no.: 637780284

Links
- Journal homepage; Online access; Online archive

The International Journal of Press/Politics is a quarterly peer-reviewed academic journal covering the field of political science and journalism, especially the linkages between the news media and political processes and actors. The editor-in-chief is Cristian Vaccari (University of Edinburgh). It was established in 1996 and is published by SAGE Publishing. Since 2015, the journal has hosted an annual conference that attracts scholars from around the world.

== Abstracting and indexing ==
The journal is abstracted and indexed in Scopus, Social Sciences Citation Index, Wilson Social Sciences Index Retrospective, ProQuest, and EBSCO. According to the Journal Citation Reports, the journal has a 2020 impact factor of 6.592, ranking it 9th out of 182 journals in the category "Political Science" and 7th out of 94 journals in the category "Communication".

== See also ==
- List of political science journals
