= The Japanese Woman (book) =

1992 book by Sumiko Iwao

The Japanese Woman: Traditional Image and Changing Reality
- Author: Sumiko Iwao
- Published: 28 December 1992
- Publisher: Free Press
- Pages: 304
- ISBN: 978-0-02-932315-1

The Japanese Woman: Traditional Image and Changing Reality is a non-fiction book by Japanese psychologist and academic Sumiko Iwao. It was translated to English by Lynn E. Riggs and was published in 1992 by Free Press. The book is about feminism in Japan and the role of Japanese woman in society after World War II.

The Japanese Woman was praised by reviewers for offering a non-Western perspective on feminism and women's issues. Several reviewers felt, however, that Iwao had overgeneralized and simplified the Japanese women's perspectives and lives. Susan Long, in Journal of Japanese Studies, was "frustrat[ed]" with the book from an academic perspective, but recommended it to a more general audience. She felt that Iwao's writing could be imprecise, criticised her for not presenting data to back up some of her ideas, and asserted that Iwao had overgeneralized groups of people. A review in Publishers Weekly also stated that Iwao's claims could be "ambiguous", and in Signs, reviewer Gordon Andrew noted how Iwao had not discussed events such as the women-led 1954 Omi Silk Dispute and the 1960-1961 Nurses' strike, using that to back up his claim that she has oversimplified the subject. However, he also described many of Iwao's observations as "insightful" and praised her writing.
