= Policy Studies Organization =

Academic organization

Policy Studies Organization (PSO) is an academic organization whose purpose is to advance the study of policy analysis by publishing academic journals, books, sponsoring conferences and producing programs, curriculum, and videos.

== History ==
In 1972, the Policy Studies Organization formed out of a number of groups including the American Political Science Association to focus on important public policy issues. Some of the goals of the PSO included sponsoring conferences, obtaining discounts for subscriptions and books, and encouraging conventions both regionally and nationally. The Policy Studies Journal was soon established alongside the PSO to focus on policy matters like environmental protection, education, peace, and civil liberties. There are now 35 journals in different fields and more than 1000 books in print from the PSO's Westphalia Press.

== Conferences ==
The PSO sponsors major international conferences year round to promote multidisciplinary conversations of relevant policy issues. The goal of these events is to encourage NGOs, government officials, students, academics, and the general public to engage in dialogues about on-going policy concerns. These conferences are co-sponsored by the American Public University System. The following are conferences held by the PSO annually:

- PSW Lecture Series
- Middle East Dialogue
- World Conference on Fraternalism, Social Capital, and Civil Society
- International Criminology Conference
- Space Education & Strategic Applications Conference
- Dupont Summit on Science, Technology, and Environmental Policy

The PSO is also working on a new series of conferences with Sculpture Review, and has an upcoming conference series on the uses of public space, with the first of planned conferences occurring on June 4, 2023 in Washington DC. In addition, the PSO assists with the annual meeting of the Far West Popular Culture Association Conference.

== Journals ==
- Asian Politics & Policy
- Digest of Middle East Studies
- European Policy Analysis
- Latin American Policy
- Policy & Internet
- Policy Studies Journal
- Policy Studies Yearbook
- Politics & Policy
- Poverty & Public Policy
- Review of Policy Research
- Risk, Hazards & Crisis in Public Policy
- World Affairs
- World Medical & Health Policy
- World Water Policy

== Open access journals ==
- Journal of Critical Infrastructure Policy
- Journal of Elder Policy
- Journal of Online Learning Research and Practice
- Ritual, Secrecy, & Civil Society
- International Journal of Criminology
- World Food Policy
- Journal on Policy and Complex Systems
- New Water Policy and Practice
- Sexuality, Gender, and Policy
- Global Security and Intelligence Studies
- Arts & International Affairs
- Popular Culture Review
- Space Education and Strategic Applications
- Saber & Scroll
- China Policy Journal
- Indian Politics & Policy
- International Journal of Open Educational Resources

== Publications ==
A key component of the Policy Studies Organization is its publications. Through its journals, book series, and open access journals, the PSO aims to disseminate policy scholarship. Many of the journals are published through Wiley-Blackwell or through open access. The PSO also publishes antiquated and original books through its own Westphalia Press imprint; titles range on subjects like history, art, politics, and the government. They recently published All Flowers Bloom by Kawika Guillermo, Winner of the 2021 Reviewers Choice Gold Award for Best General Fiction/Novel.

== Westphalia Press ==
Westphalia Press is the imprint and book-publishing division of the Policy Studies Organization. Westphalia Press takes its name from the kingdom of the same name which has long been incorporated into Germany, but was one of the first European principalities to affirm constitutional rights of its subjects and which had a robust printing and publishing tradition over the centuries.

Westphalia Press is part of the Policy Studies Organization's longtime mission to disseminate scholarship internationally, widely and cost effectively. Westphalia Press publishes original and classic reprints of scholarly and antiquarian books in a wide range of subjects, including history, health, art, literature, politics, science and government. Their publications have been the subject of articles in the New York Times, Washington Post, and numerous other outlets. Westphalia Press has published over 1,000 titles, and in addition, the Policy Studies Organization has created more than 300 books in partnership with a number of leading companies, including Macmillan, Lexington, and Gale. Some major featured categories of holdings by Westphalia Press include diplomacy and international affairs, health policy, art, freemasonry, and military history and policy; however, there are numerous other featured subjects, such as cookbooks, games, literature, health policy, environmental studies, religious studies, and food/agricultural policy.

== Presidents ==
The current president of the PSO is Paul J. Rich. Past presidents include: James Anderson, Walter Beach, William Browne, William Crotty, Kenneth Dolbeare, Yehezkel Dror, William Dunn, Thomas Dye, Matthew Holden, Richard Hula, Helen Ingram, Dorothy James, Charles Jones, Rita Mae Kelly, Robert Lane, Martin Levin, Robert Lineberry, Theodore Lowi, Duncan Macrae, Jr., Dean Mann, Daniel Mazmanian, Guy Peters, Harrell Rogers, Thomas Vocino, Larry Wade, Carol Weiss, Louise White, Aaron Wildavsky.
