= Journal for Peace and Justice Studies =

- Discipline: Peace studies, philosophy
- Language: English
- Edited by: Mark A. Wilson

Publication details
- History: 1988–present
- Publisher: Center for Peace & Justice Education (Villanova University) (United States)
- Frequency: Biannual

Standard abbreviations
- ISO 4: J. Peace Justice Stud.

Indexing
- ISSN: 1093-6831 (print); 2153-9839 (web)
- LCCN: sf9392337
- OCLC no.: 19908928

Links
- Journal homepage; Online access

The Journal for Peace and Justice Studies is a biannual peer-reviewed academic journal published by the Center for Peace & Justice Education (Villanova University). It covers issues of social justice and peace, informed by the Catholic social tradition. The journal was established in 1988. All issues are available online from the Philosophy Documentation Center.

== See also ==
- List of philosophy journals
- List of political science journals
