= Teaching Public Administration =

Academic journal

- Discipline: Public Administration
- Language: English
- Edited by: John Diamond, Catherine Farrell

Publication details
- Former name: Public Administration Teacher
- History: 1976-present
- Publisher: SAGE Publications
- Frequency: Biannually

Standard abbreviations
- ISO 4: Teach. Public Adm.

Indexing
- ISSN: 0144-7394
- OCLC no.: 749128421

Links
- Journal homepage; Online access; Online archive

Teaching Public Administration is a biannual peer-reviewed academic journal that covers the field of education as relating to public administration. The editors-in-chief are Karin Bottom, University of Birmingham, Yifei Yan, University of Southampton, and William Hatcher, Augusta University. It was established in 1976 as Public Administration Teacher and was edited by Derek Gregory. In 1977 the journal changed its name to Teaching Public Administration. Under the editorship of Michael Hunt Sheffield Hallam University) the journal ceased operations in 2009. In 2012, the journal was revitalized, with SAGE Publications taking over as publisher in association with the Public Administration Committee (PAC) of the Joint University Council of the Applied Social Sciences.

== Editors-in-chief ==
The following persons have been editors-in-chief:

- 2026-present: Karin Bottom, University of Birmingham, Yifei Yan, University of Southampton, and William Hatcher, Augusta University
- 2024-2025: Karin Bottom, University of Birmingham, Yifei Yan, University of Southampton, and Leigh Hersey, Louisiana Monroe University
- 2023-2024: Catherine Farrell, University of Cardiff and Leigh Hersey, Louisiana Monroe University
- 2012–2023: John Diamond, Edge Hill University and Catherine Farrell, University of Cardiff
- 1993-2009: Michael Hunt, Sheffield Hallam University
- 1987-1993: Lloyf Edmonds, University of Manchester
- 1984-1987: Martin Minogue, University of Manchester
- 1984-1987: James Craig, University of Manchester
- 1977-1984, Ron Goslin, University of Manchester
- 1976-1977: Derek Gregory, Teesside Polytechnic

b==Abstracting and indexing== The journal is abstracted and indexed in:

- Education Resources Information Center
- Emerging Sources Citation Index
- Scopus
- Public Affairs Index

== See also ==
- List of public administration journals
