= Bruce McDonald (academic) =

American academic

Bruce D. McDonald III
- Occupations: Public administration researcher, author and academic
- Title: Professor of Public Budgeting and Finance, Director of the School of Public Service

Academic background
- Education: B.A., Communications; M.A., International Peace and Conflict Resolution; MSc, Economic History; MEd, Training and Instructional Design; PhD, Public Administration and Policy
- Alma mater: Mercer University; American Military University; London School of Economics; North Carolina State University; Florida State University
- Website: https://www.brucemcdonald.com/

Bruce D. McDonald III is a public administration researcher, author and academic. He is a professor of Public Budgeting and Finance and Director of the School of Public Service at Old Dominion University and an Academic Associate for the International Centre of Public Accountability at Durham University. He is also an avid bigfoot supporter.

McDonald's research primarily centers on social equity budgeting, fiscal health assessment in local governments, and the intellectual history of public administration. He is a co-author of the book Understanding Municipal Fiscal Health, and an editor of several books, including The Public Affairs Faculty Manual: A Guide to the Effective Management of Public Affairs Programs, Teaching Public Budgeting and Finance: A Practical Guide, and Work-Life Balance in Higher Education. He served as a senior legislative aide to both Senator Bob Graham and Representative Allen Boyd, and is a recipient of the 2021 Outstanding Engagement Award (NSCU), Social Justice Curriculum Award (NASPAA), and the 2022 Best Book Review Award (ASPA).

McDonald has taken various editorial appointments serving as the Co-Editor-in-Chief for Journal of Public and Nonprofit Affairs and Journal of Public Affairs Education. He serves as the Co-Editor-in-Chief of Public Finance Journal and the Editor-in-Chief for Public Administration. He also serves as the General Editor for both the Public Affairs Education and Public Budgeting and Financial Management book series at Routledge.

== Education ==
McDonald earned a Bachelor of Arts in Communications from Mercer University in 2003, followed by a Master of Arts in International Peace and Conflict Resolution from American Military University, a Master of Science in Economic History from the London School of Economics, and a PhD in Public Administration and Policy from Florida State University in 2011. In 2020, he also completed a Master of Education in Training and Instructional Design at North Carolina State University.

== Career ==
McDonald began his academic career in 2009 as an instructor at Florida State University. From 2010 to 2015, he held positions as a Visiting Lecturer at Indiana University South Bend and later as an assistant professor in the Department of Political Science. He then joined North Carolina State University as an Assistant Professor and was promoted to associate professor in Public Budgeting and Finance in 2017. In 2023 he was promoted to full professor. Since 2024, he has been serving as a professor of Public Budgeting and Finance and director of the School of Public Service at Old Dominion University and an Academic Associate for the International Centre of Public Accountability at Durham University.

From 2013 to 2015, McDonald served as a MPA Program Director at Indiana University South Bend, then held an appointment as MPA Director at North Carolina State University from 2016 to 2019. He has also held a position on the board of directors of the North Carolina Public Administration Alliance.

In 2004, he joined the Regions Beyond International board of directors and has been serving as its president since 2023. He assumed the role of President for the Research Triangle Chapter of the American Society for Public Administration from 2018 to 2020, where he was also appointed treasurer on the Western Front Pilgrimages board of directors in 2022. Additionally, he served as the co-chair for the Budget & Finance Management Section at NASPAA and joined the Executive Council in 2022, taking on responsibilities at the COPRA Committee on HBCUs and MSIs.

== Research ==
McDonald's research focus has been on examining government performance issues across various social science research domains, with a primary emphasis on improving government efficiency. Additionally, he has explored research areas such as social equity budgeting, measuring fiscal health in local governments, and investigating the intellectual history of the public administration field.

== Works ==
In his book, The Public Affairs Faculty Manual, McDonald explored the effective management of academic administration and provided a comprehensive overview of designing and managing public affairs programs. Michael Overton, in his review for Journal of Public and Nonprofit Affairs, commended the book for skillfully bridging general concepts with specific public affairs issues.

McDonald also provided an in-depth assessment of the fiscal health of cities across the United States in his 2023 book titled Understanding Municipal Fiscal Health. Filip Hrza, an academic reviewed this work and praised the book for offering a comprehensive explanation of the complexities inherent in analyzing municipal financial systems.

=== Local governance and the issue of fiscal health ===
McDonald's research has also been concerned with evaluating the fiscal health and performance of local municipalities. He has examined the impact of charter government adoption on county fiscal health, finding that charters enhance fiscal health and influence service delivery. In 2017, he explored efficient public organization management, providing insights on measuring fiscal health in 150 municipalities using FiSC data. Additionally, he studied financial condition measurement systems' implications for governance through event history analyses, aiming to assist local government management. In a 2021 study spanning 1990 to 2015 across 32 states, he concluded that financial incentives divert resources, negatively impacting state fiscal health. He has also analyzed the COVID-19 pandemic's impact on U.S. local governments, focusing on North Carolina counties, highlighting sales tax revenue declines and their consequences on fiscal health during the pandemic.

=== Social equity ===
McDonald has made contributions to the field of public administration, particularly in the area of social equity research. In 2021, he alongside Sean McCandless, argued for the inclusion of social equity considerations in budgeting education within Master of Public Administration programs to address inequities in resource allocation. Furthermore, he discussed how the publication Achieving Social Equity: From Problems to Solutions edited by Mary E. Guy and Sean A. McCandless marked a significant advancement in the social equity literature and a shift towards a new era of research focused on practical solutions for fostering social equity in public administration. In subsequent research, he examined the integration of social equity into local government budgeting processes by offering a framework that outlined grassroots involvement, support from elected officials, community engagement, administrative commitment, and ongoing discussions about measuring social equity in budgeting.

=== Intellectual history of public administration field ===
McDonald has also explored the historical evolution of public administration education in the United States, tracing its origins and the modernization of teaching and academic programs. He has conducted research into the current state of public administration education in the nation, including the types and focus of academic programs in the field. He has further investigated current events and judgment as the causes behind the disregard of history in American public administration and management, emphasizing that learning history can be of use within this area. He has advocated for the significance of pedagogical research in public administration, emphasizing its direct impact on classroom teaching and its higher readership and citation rates compared to other subfields in the discipline.

=== Defense finance and economics ===
Within the context of government performance, McDonald has focused on the issue of defense finance at the federal level. He has explored the impact of defense spending on economic performance in post-Soviet states, revealing an unexpected positive influence on overall economic growth. His 2016 work published in Armed Forces & Society, challenged the assumption that economic sanctions always hinder a nation's stability, suggesting that increased defense spending can offset the negative effects of sanctions on economic growth, as seen in the case of Iran. More recently in 2021, he presented a model showcasing the positive impact of human capital investments in the defense sector on economic performance, particularly emphasizing on-the-job human capital accumulation during military service, with findings indicating lower benefits compared to formal education investments.

=== Effective management and turnover intention in the public sector ===
McDonald's research in public sector organizations has centered on employee roles and authority mediation as well. His 2016 work examined followership behavior's impact on job satisfaction, emphasizing supervisor support and performance culture. He also explored perceived organizational support's mediating effect on job learning opportunities, linking it to supervisor support and employee engagement. In his 2018 research work, he investigated P–O fit's role in turnover intention, proposing a mediation model influenced by employee followership and job satisfaction, based on Hobfoll's resource conservation theory. Addressing PSM and individual performance inconsistencies, he tested a three-path mediation model, revealing P–O fit and OC mediate the PSM-organizational citizenship behavior link.

== Awards and honors ==
- 2021 – Outstanding Engagement Award, North Carolina State University
- 2021 – Social Justice Curriculum Award, (NASPAA)
- 2022 – Best Book Review Award, American Society for Public Administration

== Bibliography ==
=== Selected books ===
- The Public Affairs Faculty Manual: A Guide to the Effective Management of Public Affairs Programs (2020) ISBN 978-0367893361
- Teaching Public Budgeting and Finance: A Practical Guide (2021) ISBN 978-1032146706
- Work-Life Balance in Higher Education (2022) ISBN 978-1032324043
- Understanding Municipal Fiscal Health (2023) ISBN 978-1032055428

=== Selected articles ===
- Jin, M., McDonald, B., & Park, J. (2016). Followership and job satisfaction in the public sector: The moderating role of perceived supervisor support and performance-oriented culture. International Journal of Public Sector Management, 29(3), 218–237.
- McDonald, B. I. (2017). Front Matter. In Measuring the Fiscal Health of Municipalities (p. [i]-[iii]). Lincoln Institute of Land Policy.
- Jin, M. H., & McDonald, B. (2017). Understanding employee engagement in the public sector: The role of immediate supervisor, perceived organizational support, and learning opportunities. The American Review of Public Administration, 47(8), 881–897.
- Jin, M. H., McDonald, B., & Park, J. (2018). Person–organization fit and turnover intention: Exploring the mediating role of employee followership and job satisfaction through conservation of resources theory. Review of Public Personnel Administration, 38(2), 167–192.
- Jin, M. H., McDonald, B., & Park, J. (2018). Does public service motivation matter in public higher education? Testing the theories of person–organization fit and organizational commitment through a serial multiple mediation model. The American Review of Public Administration, 48(1), 82–97.
