= William N. Dunn =

American scholar and professor of international relations (1938–2022)

William N. Dunn (August 17, 1938 – May 16, 2022) was an American scholar and professor of international relations at University of Pittsburgh. He is known for his research on public policy and public administration. Dunn was a recipient of Aaron Wildavsky Award and Jeffrey Pressman Award from Policy Studies Organization.

== Books ==
- Public Policy Analysis, William N Dunn, Edition 5 (revised), Taylor & Francis, 2015, ISBN 978-1-317-34483-4
