= Swiss Political Science Review =

- Discipline: Political science
- Language: English, German, French and Italian
- Edited by: Thomas Widmer

Publication details
- History: 1995–present
- Publisher: Wiley-Blackwell (Switzerland)
- Frequency: Quarterly
- Impact factor: 1.258 (2015)

Standard abbreviations
- ISO 4: Swiss Political Sci. Rev.

Indexing
- ISSN: 1424-7755 (print); 1662-6370 (web)
- LCCN: sn99032802
- OCLC no.: 60625069

Links
- Journal homepage; Online archive

Swiss Political Science Review (SPSR), also known as Schweizerische Zeitschrift für Politikwissenschaft (German), Revue Suisse de Science Politique (French), and Rivista Svizzera di Scienza Politica (Italian) is a quarterly peer-reviewed interdisciplinary academic journal covering political science published by Wiley-Blackwell. The current editors are Prof. Martino Maggetti and Prof. Anke Tresch (University of Lausanne).

== Abstracting and indexing ==
The journal is abstracted and indexed in:

- EconLit (AEA)
- Historical Abstracts (EBSCO Publishing)
- International Bibliography of Book Reviews (IBR)
- International Bibliography of Periodical Literature (IBZ)
- International Bibliography of the Social Sciences (IBSS)
- International Political Science Abstracts (IPSA)
- Mir@bel
- PAIS: Public Affairs Information Service
- Political Science Complete
- Scopus
- Social Sciences Citation Index
- Sociological Abstracts
- Web of Science
- Worldwide Political Science Abstracts

According to the Journal Citation Reports, the journal has a 2015 impact factor of 1.258, ranking it 48th out of 163 journals in the category "Political Science".

== See also ==
- List of political science journals
