= Sumiko Iwao =

Japanese psychologist (1935–2018)

Sumiko Iwao (岩男 寿美子, Iwao Sumiko; January 2, 1935 – January 11, 2018) was a Japanese psychologist, educator, editor and professor emeritus at Keio University in Tokyo. She served as the editor-in-chief of Japan Echo, an English-language magazine and predecessor of Nippon.com, from 1997 until 2007, as well as a member of the Echo's editorial board from 1985 until 2007.

== Biography ==
Iwao was born on January 2, 1935. She graduated from Keio University in Tokyo and then obtained her doctorate in psychology from Yale University in 1962. She served as a professor at Keio University and Musashi Institute of Technology (present-day Tokyo City University), as well as a visiting professor at Harvard University in the United States.

She chaired the national Council on Gender Equality and served on the National Public Safety Commission of Japan, in addition to other government and public service posts. In addition to her work as a profession and social psychologist, Iwao authored numerous books and papers focusing on women in Japan, foreigners in Japan (or gaijin), and the Japanese media. Her best known works include The Japanese Woman: Traditional Image and Changing Reality, which was published in 1992.

Iwao retired from Keio University in 2005 and stepped down as editor-in-chief of Japan Echo in 2007. However, she remained active in children's education, especially for girls. Iwao was chairwoman of Group Kilimanjaro, which operates the Sakura Girls Secondary School, a boarding school in Tanzania.

In 2007, Iwao was awarded the Order of the Rising Sun.

Sumiko Iwao died on January 11, 2018, at the age of 83.
