= Environmental Politics (journal) =

Academic journal

- Discipline: Political science
- Language: English
- Edited by: John M. Meyer

Publication details
- History: 1992–present
- Publisher: Taylor and Francis (United Kingdom)
- Frequency: 7/year
- Impact factor: 5.147 (2021)

Standard abbreviations
- ISO 4: Environ. Politics

Indexing
- ISSN: 0964-4016 (print); 1743-8934 (web)
- LCCN: 93650674
- OCLC no.: 50789417

Links
- Journal homepage; Online access; Ingentaconnect archive

Environmental Politics is a peer-reviewed academic journal, published seven times per year, which provides a forum for environmental politics particularly in relation to environmental social movements, NGOs, and parties; analysis of environmental policy-making; and environmental political thought. The journal publishes articles on politics at all scales (local, national, and global) and studies from all regions of the world. The journal's editor-in-chief is John M. Meyer (Humboldt State University).

== Abstracting and indexing ==
- CSA Sociological Abstracts
- Current Contents/Social & Behavioural Sciences
- Development Abstracts FISHLIT
- International Political Science Abstracts
- ISI Alerting Services
- Land, Life & Leisure, Environmental Abstracts
- Political Science Abstracts
- Social Planning/Policy
- Social Science Abstracts
- Social SciSearch
- Social Sciences Citation Index
- Social Sciences Index (H.W. Wilson)

According to the Journal Citation Reports, the journal has a 2019 impact factor of 4.320, ranking it 3rd out of 180 journals in the category "Political Science" and 21st out of 123 journals in the category "Environmental Studies".

== See also ==
- List of environmental social science journals
- List of political science journals
