= Poverty & Public Policy =

- Discipline: Political science
- Language: English
- Edited by: Connie Snyder Mick

Publication details
- History: 2009–present
- Publisher: Wiley-Blackwell on behalf of the Policy Studies Organization
- Frequency: Quarterly

Standard abbreviations
- ISO 4: Poverty Public Policy

Indexing
- ISSN: 1944-2858

Links
- Journal homepage; Online access; Online archive

Poverty & Public Policy is a quarterly e-only peer-reviewed academic journal published by Wiley-Blackwell on behalf of the Policy Studies Organization. The journal was established in 2009 with editor-in-chief Max J. Skidmore (University of Missouri at Kansas City) and Dan Stroud (Midwestern State University) as the Managing Editor. It is currently edited by Connie Snyder Mick. Governance of the journal was transferred to the University of Notre Dame's Center for Social Concerns in 2018, and Dr. Connie Snyder Mick assumed the role Editor-in-Chief. In that time, Managing Editors have included Chelsea King and Eleanor Jones. Previous Development Editors have included Geoffrey Burdell. Brianna McCaslin (University of Notre Dame) and Tyler Dixon (University of Notre Dame) serve as current Managing and Development Editors for the journal. The journal focuses on research related to poverty, welfare, and economic inequality worldwide.

The editorial board consists of:

Sonia Kapur (University of North Carolina Asheville), Chang Yee Kwan (National Chengchi University), Philip Young P. Hong (Loyola University Chicago), Mukul G. Asher (University of Singapore, Amrita Center for Economics and Governance), Silvia Borzutsky (Carnegie Mellon University), Pamela Herd (Georgetown University), Stephanie Kelton (Stony Brook University), Brij Mohan (Louisiana State University), M. Niaz Asadul (Malaya University), Udaya R. Waglé (Western Michigan University), Catherine Weaver (University of Texas Austin), and Nikolaos Zahariadis (Rhodes College).
