= Review of Public Personnel Administration =

- Discipline: Public Human Resources Management
- Language: English
- Edited by: Meghna Sabharwal

Publication details
- History: 1980–present
- Publisher: SAGE Publications
- Frequency: Quarterly
- Impact factor: 4.2 (2023)

Standard abbreviations
- ISO 4: Rev. Public Pers. Adm.

Indexing
- ISSN: 0734-371X (print); 1552-759X (web)
- LCCN: 85643719
- OCLC no.: 60688742

Links
- Journal homepage; Online access; Online archive

Review of Public Personnel Administration is a peer-reviewed academic journal that publishes papers in the field of public administration. The journal's editor is Meghna Sabharwal (The University of Texas at Dallas). It has been in publication since 1980 and is currently published by SAGE Publications.

== Scope ==
Review of Public Personnel Administration publishes scholarship on human resource management in public service organizations. The journal contains articles covering both traditional and emerging topics, including analysis of the effects of specific HR procedures or programs on the management function and assessment of the impact of HR management.

== Abstracting and indexing ==
Review of Public Personnel Administration is abstracted and indexed in, among other databases: SCOPUS, and the Social Sciences Citation Index. According to the Journal Citation Reports, its 2023 impact factor is 4.2, ranking it 11 out of 91 journals in the category 'Public Administration'.
