= European Journal on Criminal Policy and Research =

- Discipline: Criminology
- Language: English
- Edited by: Ernesto U. Savona

Publication details
- History: March 1993-present
- Publisher: Springer Science+Business Media
- Frequency: Quarterly
- Impact factor: 2.8 (2025)

Standard abbreviations
- ISO 4: Eur. J. Crim. Policy Res.
- NLM: Eur J Crim Pol Res

Indexing
- ISSN: 0928-1371 (print); 1572-9869 (web)
- OCLC no.: 41560905

Links
- Journal homepage; Online access; Online archive

The European Journal on Criminal Policy and Research is a quarterly peer-reviewed academic journal covering criminology as it relates to public policy. It was established in 1993 and is published by Springer Science+Business Media. The editor-in-chief is Ernesto U. Savona (Catholic University of the Sacred Heart). According to the Journal Citation Reports, the journal has a 2016 impact factor of 2.8 and, as of 2026, ranks 13th among journals in the field of criminology and penology (i.e., Q1).
