= State and Local Government Review =

Academic journal

- Discipline: Public administration
- Language: English
- Edited by: Michael J. Scicchitano

Publication details
- Former name: Georgia Government Review
- History: 1968-present
- Publisher: SAGE Publications
- Frequency: Quarterly

Standard abbreviations
- ISO 4: State Local Gov. Rev.

Indexing
- ISSN: 0160-323X
- LCCN: 78645146
- OCLC no.: 741263129

Links
- Journal homepage; Online access; Online archive

State and Local Government Review is a quarterly, peer-reviewed, academic journal on public administration. Since 2021, the co-editors are Kimberly Nelson (University of North Carolina, Chapel Hill) and Eric Zeemering (University of Georgia). The journal was established in 1968 as the Georgia Government Review by the Carl Vinson Institute of Government (the Institute of Government until 1983; University of Georgia) and is the official journal of the Section on Intergovernmental Administration and Management of the American Society for Public Administration. It obtained its current title in 1976 and continued to be published by the Institute of Government until 2010. Currently, the journal is published by SAGE Publications.

== Abstracting and indexing ==
State and Local Government Review is abstracted and indexed in:

- Emerging Sources Citation Index
- CSA Worldwide Political Science Abstracts
- International Bibliography of Book Reviews of Scholarly Literature in the Humanities and Social Sciences
- International Political Science Abstracts
- Peace Research Abstracts
- Political Science Complete
- Public Administration Abstracts
- TOC Premier
- Urban Studies Abstracts

== Editors-in-chief ==
The following persons have been editors-in-chief of the journal:

- 2006-2020 Michael Scicchitano (University of Florida) 2003-2005 Thomas J. Pavlak (University of Georgia)
- 1986-2002 Richard W. Campbell (University of Georgia)
- 1983-1985 Joseph W. Whorton (University of Georgia)
- 1976-1982 C. David Billings (University of Georgia)
- 1974-1975 John B. Legler (University of Georgia)
- 1970-1971 Angela W. Reaves (University of Georgia)
- 1968-1969 Daniel G. Boserup (University of Georgia)

== See also ==
- List of public administration journals
