= Policy & Internet =

- Discipline: Political science, communication studies
- Language: English
- Edited by: Jonathon Hutchinson

Publication details
- History: 2009-present
- Publisher: Wiley-Blackwell on behalf of the Policy Studies Organization
- Frequency: Quarterly

Standard abbreviations
- ISO 4: Policy Internet

Indexing
- ISSN: 1944-2866
- LCCN: 2008203955
- OCLC no.: 265035921

Links
- Journal homepage; Online access; Online archive

Policy & Internet is an interdisciplinary peer-reviewed academic journal published by Wiley-Blackwell on behalf of the Policy Studies Organization.

The journal was established in 2009 at University of Oxford (UK). In 2015 it moved to the discipline of Media and Communications at the University of Sydney. Joanne E. Gray is the editor-in-chief and the Senior Managing Editor is Milica Stilinovic, both from University of Sydney. The original focus of the journal was on the effects of the Internet on public policy, including the ethical implications of new technologies such as social networking, platforms, and algorithms.

Recently the journal scope has expanded to include the societal implications of the Internet digital technologies and responses from governments, industry, communities and individuals.

== Abstracting and indexing ==
The journal is abstracted and indexed in Current Contents/Social & Behavioral Sciences, ProQuest databases, Scopus, and the Social Sciences Citation Index.
