= Gwinnett Daily Post =

Newspaper in Lawrenceville, Georgia

- Type: Daily newspaper
- Format: Broadsheet
- Owner: Times-Journal Inc.
- Publisher: (formerly) J.K. Murphy
- Founded: 1995
- Headquarters: Lawrenceville, Georgia
- Circulation: 64,113 (as of 2013)
- ISSN: 1086-0096
- Website: gwinnettdailypost.com

The Gwinnett Daily Post is a daily newspaper published in Gwinnett County, Georgia, and serves as the county's legal organ. The newspaper is owned by Times-Journal Inc. and prints Wednesday and Sunday each week.

== History ==
In 1970 advertising director Bruce Still left his job at the Gwinnett Daily News to start a weekly publication in Lawrenceville, the Lawrenceville Home Weekly. In 1973 it was renamed The Home Weekly and was published until 1987, when it was renamed The Gwinnett Home Weekly to reflect its expanded readership and circulation. These were weekly publications that served Lawrenceville and surrounding Gwinnett County. In 1992 the Gwinnett Home Weekly changed its name to the Gwinnett Post-Tribune and began publishing twice a week. The newspaper was owned by Still Advertising and Promotions until 1995, when Gray Communications purchased it for $3.7 Million and reorganized it as a daily publication, the Gwinnett Daily Post, which published Tuesday through Saturday. In 2005 Gray's newspaper holdings were spun off into a separate company which was named Triple Crown Media. Triple Crown Media changed its name to Southern Community Newspapers Incorporated in 2010.

A Sunday edition of the paper was added in 1997 due to its expanding circulation, and the Tuesday publication was dropped in 2012.

In November 2022, the paper was sold by Southern Community Newspapers, Inc. to Times-Journal Inc.

== Circulation ==
By 1996 the newly owned and renamed Gwinnett Daily Post had a circulation of 13,055, according to the Audit Bureau of Circulations's September 1996 report. Gwinnett County officials designated the Gwinnett Daily Post as the county's official legal organ that same year. In January 1997 the Gwinnett Daily Post partnered with Northeast Gwinnett Cable Vision to provide its customers with free Gwinnett Daily Post subscriptions, which were purchased at a discounted rate by Northeast Gwinnett Cable Vision. The agreement added subscriptions for over 38,000 cable customers, which more than tripled the Post's circulation.

In response to the subscription partnership, the Atlanta Journal-Constitution filed a lawsuit in 1997 against Gwinnett County to prevent them from using the Gwinnett Daily Post as the county's legal organ. They argued that cable customers were not considered paid subscriptions, citing a Georgia statute that required 85% of a newspaper's circulation be paid subscribers in order to be designated as a county's legal organ. The lawsuit was dismissed by a Gwinnett Superior Court which was appealed and taken to the Georgia Supreme Court. That court ruled in favor of the Gwinnett Daily Post and dismissed the lawsuit.
