= Policy Studies Journal =

- Discipline: Political science
- Language: English
- Edited by: Dr. Geoboo Song (송거부)

Publication details
- History: 1972–present
- Publisher: Wiley-Blackwell on behalf of the Policy Studies Organization and the American Political Science Association
- Frequency: Quarterly
- Impact factor: 5.141 (2020)

Standard abbreviations
- ISO 4: Policy Stud. J.

Indexing
- ISSN: 0190-292X (print); 1541-0072 (web)
- LCCN: 72625926
- OCLC no.: 637559543

Links
- Journal homepage; Online access; Online archive

Policy Studies Journal is a quarterly peer-reviewed academic journal published by Wiley-Blackwell on behalf of the Policy Studies Organization and the American Political Science Association's Public Policy Section. The journal was established in 1972. The current editor-in-chief is Dr. Geoboo Song (송거부) (University of Arkansas). The journal publishes articles on a wide range of public policy issues.

According to the Journal Citation Reports, the journal has a 2020 impact factor of 5.141, ranking it 17th out of 182 journals in the category "Political Science" and 7th out of 47 journals in the category "Public Administration".

== See also ==
- List of political science journals
