= Naomi E. Stotland =

American obstetrician-gynecologist

Naomi E. Stotland is an American obstetrician-gynecologist. She is a professor and the associate director of medical student education at UCSF School of Medicine.

== Education ==
Stotland completed a bachelor of arts and graduated cum laude in philosophy at Barnard College in 1991. She earned a doctor of medicine in 1995 from Pritzker School of Medicine. She completed an obstetrics and gynaecology residency from 1995 to 1999 at the University of California, San Francisco (UCSF). From 2000 to 2001, Stotland was a fellow at the UCSF advance training in clinical research program in the department of epidemiology and biostatistics. She completed a fellowship in the UCSF Institute for Health Policy Studies, Health Services Research Training Program from 2000 to 2003.

== Career ==
Stotland is a professor of obstetrics and gynecology and the associate director of medical student education at UCSF School of Medicine. She researches weight gain in pregnancy, maternal nutrition, pre-term birth, and decision analysis. Stotland's clinical and research focuses on low-income populations. She is a contributor at the Our Bodies Ourselves. Stotland has a clinical practice at the San Francisco General Hospital.
