= Risk, Hazards & Crisis in Public Policy =

Political science journal

- Discipline: Political science
- Language: English
- Edited by: Dr. Sanneke Kuipers

Publication details
- History: 2010-present
- Publisher: Wiley-Blackwell on behalf of the Policy Studies Organization
- Frequency: Quarterly

Standard abbreviations
- ISO 4: Risk Hazards Crisis Public Policy

Indexing
- ISSN: 1944-4079

Links
- Journal homepage; Online access; Online archive

Risk, Hazards & Crisis in Public Policy (RHCPP) is a quarterly peer-reviewed academic journal published by Wiley-Blackwell on behalf of the Policy Studies Organization. The journal was established in 2010 and the editor-in-chief is Dr. Sanneke Kuipers (Leiden University). It is abstracted and indexed in the ProQuest databases Social Services Abstracts and Worldwide Political Sciences Abstracts.
