= Public Performance & Management Review =

Quarterly peer-reviewed academic journal

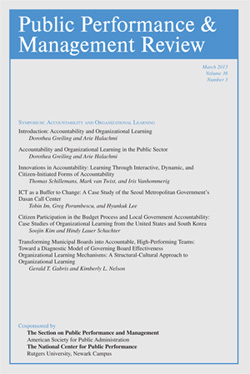
- Discipline: Public administration
- Language: English
- Edited by: Marc Holzer

Publication details
- Former name(s): Public Productivity Review
- History: 1975-present
- Publisher: Routledge
- Frequency: Quarterly
- Impact factor: 1.600 (2018)

Standard abbreviations
- ISO 4: Public Perform. Manag. Rev.

Indexing
- ISSN: 1530-9576 (print); 1557-9271 (web)
- LCCN: 00214991
- JSTOR: 15309576
- OCLC no.: 818984093

Links
- Journal homepage

Public Performance & Management Review is a quarterly peer-reviewed academic journal that covers all aspects of the management of public and nonprofit organizations and agencies. It was established in 1975 and published by M.E. Sharpe and cosponsored by the Section on Public Performance and Management of the American Society for Public Administration and the National Center for Public Productivity at the School of Public Affairs and Administration (Rutgers University-Newark). Currently Public Performance & Management Review published by Taylor and Francis, and managed by the founding and current editor-in-chief is Marc Holzer (Suffolk University).

== Abstracting and indexing ==
The journal is abstracted and indexed in Current Contents/Social and Behavioral Sciences, Local Government Information Network, PAIS International, Scopus, Social Sciences Citation Index, Wilson Business Periodicals Index, and CSA Worldwide Political Science Abstracts. According to the Journal Citation Reports, the journal has a 2018 impact factor of 1.600, ranking it 29th out of 47 journals in the category "Public Administration".
