= Sonia Jackson (academic) =

British academic (born 1934)

Sonia Jackson, OBE (born 1934) is a British academic and Emeritus Professor at the Institute of Education, University College London. As of 2021, Jackson is semi-retired but still in active collaboration with colleagues at the Thomas Coram Research Unit and internationally. Her main areas of research are the education of children in care, foster care, social exclusion, Early Childhood Education and Care (ECEC), and international comparisons of children's services.

== Early life and education ==
Jackson is the elder daughter of Maurice Edelman and Matilda Edelman, née Yager. Jackson was evacuated to Buckinghamshire in 1940 and grew up in Chesham Bois. She was educated at Springfield Grange and Belle Vue Prep before attending Berkhamsted School for Girls (present day Berkhamsted School) as a day girl. Jackson went on to read history at Newnham College, Cambridge, graduating with 2.1 Hons in 1956, which she followed with a Postgraduate Certificate in Social Studies (with Distinction) at Somerville College, Oxford. She later took a second degree in Natural Sciences (Psychology) at the University of Cambridge and qualified as a social worker with a Diploma from the London School of Economics (CQSW).

== Career and Research ==
Jackson's first job was research assistant to the anthropologist, Edmund Leach. Subsequent jobs include working as a psychologist and social worker, NHS Child Psychiatric Clinic, welfare officer, editor of Where and executive director of Advisory Centre for Education (ACE).

After spending four years as social worker for Cambridgeshire Social Services, Jackson started her first academic appointment as Economic and Social Research Council (formerly SSRC) research officer at the University of Huddersfield where she conducted the first major study of childminding.

Jackson was subsequently appointed Lecturer (later Senior Lecturer) at the University of Bristol (1976 – 1992), before becoming Professor of Applied Social Studies and Head of Social Policy at Swansea University (previously Swansea College, University of Wales) (1992 – 2001) and finally Professor of Social Care and Education at the Institute of Education (now part of University College London) (2001) and Professor Emerita (2003).

Research at UCL centered on post-compulsory education of children in care in England, Scotland and four other European countries (Sweden, Denmark, Spain and Hungary) as well as Australia and New Zealand.

== Awards and honours ==
- Presented with the Meering Award for Outstanding Services to Young Children by the National Association for Nursery and Family Care in 1985.
- Appointed Honorary Fellow of the Joint University Council in 2000.
- Gave the MacQuarie Street Lecture on Children and Young People to the parliament of New South Wales in 2001.
- Appointed Officer of the British Empire (OBE) in the 2002 New Year Honours for services to children in care.

== Personal life ==
Jackson first married in 1956 to Philip Abrams d. 31 October 1981, Fellow of Peterhouse, Cambridge, later Professor of Sociology, University of Durham; they divorced in 1970. In 1978 she married Brian Jackson, sociologist, author and social entrepreneur. He died suddenly in Huddersfield on 3 July 1983. In 1990, she married Derek Greenwood, Senior Lecturer in Physics, University of Bristol. d. 15 November 2007. Jackson has two children from first marriage, two from her second, four stepchildren and 16 grandchildren.

== Publications ==
=== Notable Books ===
- Childminder: a Study in Action Research (Routledge & Kegan Paul/Penguin, 1979/81) ISBN 9780710002723
- On the Move Again? what works in creating stability for looked after children (with Nigel Thomas) (Barnardo's, 1999/2001) ISBN 0902046551
- People Under Three: Young Children in Day Care (Routledge, 1994/2004) ISBN 9780415305679
- Going to University from Care: Final Report of the By Degrees Project (Institute of Education, 2005) ISBN 9780854737154
- Education for social inclusion: can we change the future for children in care? (Institute of Education, 2010) ISBN 9780854739066
- Improving Access to Further and Higher Education for Young People in Public Care: European Policy and Practice (Jessica Kingsley Publishers, 2014) ISBN 978-1849053662
- People Under Three: Play, work and learning in a childcare setting (3rd edition) (Routledge, 2015) ISBN 978-0415665216
- Educating Children and Young People in Care: learning placements and caring schools (Jessica Kingsley, 2015) ISBN 978-1849053655

=== Selected Academic Papers ===
- Jackson, S. (1988). "The Education of Children in Care". Bristol Papers in Applied Social Studies No.1. 12 (4): 6–11. doi:10.1177/030857598801200403. S2CID 147331879.
- Jackson, S. (1998). "Looking After Children: a new approach or just an exercise in formfilling?". British Journal of Social Work. 28 (1): 45–56. doi:10.1093/oxfordjournals.bjsw.a011316.
- Jackson, S.; Martin, P.Y. (1998). "Surviving the Care System: Education and Resilience". Journal of Adolescence. 21 (5): 569–583. doi:10.1006/jado.1998.0178. PMID 9799548.
- Jackson, S. (2015). "The Virtual School for Children in Out-of-Home Care: A Strategic Approach to Improving their Educational Attainment". Children Australia. 49 (4): 327–334. doi:10.1017/cha.2015.57. S2CID 79295809.
