= Claire L. Felbinger =

American political scientist

- Born: January 9, 1956; Joliet, Illinois
- Died: May 28, 2008 (aged 52)
- Education: University of Wisconsin–Milwaukee
- Scientific career
- Fields: Political science
- Workplaces: Northern Illinois University; Cleveland State University; American University; Transportation Research Board; Japan International Transport Institute

Claire L. Felbinger (January 9, 1956 – May 28, 2008) was an American political scientist and public administration expert. She specialized in program evaluation, and conducted some of the first research on the administration and evaluation of public works initiatives. She was the chair of the Department of Public Administration at American University, a program officer at the Transportation Research Board, and a senior research associate at the Japan International Transport Institute.

== Education and positions ==
Felbinger was born on January 9, 1956, in Joliet, Illinois. She graduated at Augustana College, and then completed a PhD in public administration at the University of Wisconsin–Milwaukee in 1986. In 1985 she became a professor at Northern Illinois University, moved to Cleveland State University in 1988, and then in 1998 joined the faculty of public administration at American University, where she became the Chair of the Department of Public Administration. In 2002 she became a senior program officer at the Transportation Research Board of the National Academies of Sciences, Engineering, and Medicine. In 2006, she moved to the Japan International Transport Institute, where she was a senior research associate.

== Work ==
Felbinger's work centered on public administration and program evaluation, particularly regarding municipal infrastructure. She was an author of 6 books, in addition to chapters in edited volumes and peer-reviewed research articles. She wrote multiple books on methodological and statistical approaches to program evaluation. In 1989, Felbinger and Richard D. Bingham coauthored the book Evaluation in practice: A methodological approach, in which they discussed methods for evaluating the evaluation of policy programs, particularly given the context that many policy evaluations are undertaken with an interest in advancing a particular policy agenda related to the program being evaluated. In the 2006 book Public Program Evaluation: A Statistical Guide, Felbinger and her coauthor Laura Langbein classified the major types of program evaluation, and discussed the main issues in their design and analysis, including metanalyses of previous program studies on the types of program evaluation. Felbinger also wrote about the field of policy evaluation itself, and co-edited the book Outstanding Women in Public Administration: Leaders, Mentors, and Pioneers with Wendy A. Haynes in 2004, which was a collection of biographical entries about women who had played major roles in public administration.

From 2003 until her death in 2008, Felbinger was a member of the Board of the American Political Science Association. Felbinger was the founding editor of the journal Public Works Management & Policy, a position she held from 1995 to 2006. Felbinger was active in the Accreditation Board for Engineering and Technology, where she was a Public Member of the Board of Directors from 1998 until 2004. ABET named an award after Felbinger's efforts to promote diversity as a member of the organization's board, the Claire L. Felbinger Award for Diversity and Inclusion.

Felbinger died on May 28, 2008.

== Selected works ==
Felbinger's works included:

- Evaluation in practice: A methodological approach, with Richard D. Bingham (1989)
- Outstanding Women in Public Administration: Leaders, Mentors, and Pioneers, co-edited with Wendy A. Haynes (2004)
- Public Program Evaluation: A Statistical Guide, with Laura Langbein (2006)
