= International Journal of Rural Management =

- Discipline: Business and rural management
- Language: English
- Edited by: Tushaar Shah

Publication details
- History: Jan 2014
- Publisher: SAGE Publications
- Frequency: Bi-annual

Standard abbreviations
- ISO 4: Int. J. Rural Manag.

Indexing
- ISSN: 0973-0052 (print); 0973-0680 (web)

Links
- Journal homepage; Online access; Online archive

The International Journal of Rural Management is the first international journal that focuses exclusively on rural management as opposed to rural, community or sustainable development. It is a platform for discussion on the practical dimensions of organising and managing rural enterprises and community based organisations.

The journal is published by SAGE Publications, India in association with the Institute of Rural Management Anand.

The journal is a member of the Committee on Publication Ethics (COPE).

== Abstracting and indexing ==
International Journal of Rural Management is abstracted and indexed in:

- ProQuest: International Bibliography of the Social Sciences (IBSS)
- SCOPUS
- DeepDyve
- Portico
- Dutch-KB
- Pro-Quest-RSP
- EBSCO
- OCLC
- Ohio
- ICI
- ProQuest-Illustrata
- J-Gate
