= Asian Politics & Policy =

- Discipline: Political science
- Language: English
- Edited by: Aries A. Arugay

Publication details
- History: 2009–present
- Publisher: Wiley-Blackwell on behalf of the Policy Studies Organization
- Frequency: Quarterly

Standard abbreviations
- ISO 4: Asian Polit. Policy

Indexing
- ISSN: 1943-0779 (print); 1943-0787 (web)
- LCCN: 2008214579
- OCLC no.: 232956607

Links
- Journal homepage; Online access; Online archive

Asian Politics & Policy is a quarterly peer-reviewed academic journal published by Wiley-Blackwell on behalf of the Policy Studies Organization and the Center for Asian Politics and Policy. The journal was established in 2009. The current editor-in-chief is Aries A. Arugay of the University of the Philippines Diliman. The journal focuses on political science, public policy, and economics in Asia and international relations among Asian countries as well as between Asia and the rest of the world. The journal is abstracted and indexed in Scopus.
