= Eve Higginbotham =

American ophthalmologist and medical school administrator

Eve Juliet Higginbotham (born November 4, 1953) is an American ophthalmologist and medical school administrator.

Born in New Orleans to parents who were public school teachers, Higginbotham studied chemical engineering at Massachusetts Institute of Technology, where she earned undergraduate and master's degrees. She graduated from Harvard Medical School in 1979. After completing an internship in San Francisco and an ophthalmology residency at Louisiana State University, Higginbotham was a glaucoma fellow at Harvard.

In 1994, Higginbotham became chair of the ophthalmology department at the University of Maryland School of Medicine in Baltimore. She was later the dean and senior vice president for academic affairs at Morehouse School of Medicine in Atlanta. At Howard University, she was the senior vice president and executive dean for health sciences. In the summer of 2013, Higginbotham was named Vice Dean for Diversity and Inclusion at the Perelman School of Medicine at the University of Pennsylvania.

Higginbotham was elected to the Institute of Medicine in 2000. She was named a fellow of the American Academy of Arts and Sciences in 2009. In 2010, Higginbotham was appointed to a four-year term on the National Board of Medical Examiners, the organization responsible for the medical licensing examination in the United States. The next year, she was elected to the MIT Corporation, the school's board of trustees.
