= The American Review of Public Administration =

- Discipline: Public administration
- Language: English
- Edited by: Stephanie P. Newbold, Marc Holzer

Publication details
- Former name: Midwest Review of Public Administration
- History: 1967-present
- Publisher: SAGE Publications
- Frequency: 8 times/year
- Impact factor: 4.929 (2021)

Standard abbreviations
- ISO 4: Am. Rev. Public Adm.

Indexing
- ISSN: 0275-0740 (print); 1552-3357 (web)
- LCCN: 82643334
- OCLC no.: 7075486

Links
- Journal homepage; Online access; Online archive

The American Review of Public Administration is a peer-reviewed academic journal that covers the field of public administration. The journal's editors-in-chief are Stephanie P. Newbold and Marc Holzer. It was established in 1967 and is currently published by SAGE Publications in association with American Society for Public Administration.

== Abstracting and indexing ==
American Review of Public Administration is abstracted and indexed in Scopus and the Social Sciences Citation Index. According to the Journal Citation Reports, the journal has a 2021 impact factor of 4.92 ranking it 7 out of 49 journals in the category "Public Administration".
