= Georgia Political Science Association =

The Georgia Political Science Association (GPSA) is the professional association for political scientists in Georgia, United States. Founded in 1968, the GPSA holds an annual conference in Savannah, Georgia in November. Conference participants are from Georgia, other U.S. states, and overseas. Although political scientists are in the majority, the conference is definitely interdisciplinary. Participants have included political scientists, historians, economists, humanists, sociologists, criminologists, anthropologists, public administrators, philosophers, students, interested non-academics and many others. Currently, the membership numbers around 200 political scientists teaching in Georgia. The GPSA publishes a refereed online proceedings of the conference.

Both the University System of Georgia Board of Regents Academic Advisory Committee for Political Science and the European Union Studies Certificate Steering Committee traditionally meet during the conference.

The GPSA Board of Directors consists of seven officers and eight at-large board members. The GPSA Vice President and program chair organizes the annual conference program from proposals received by July 1 of each year. Panels and roundtables are assembled from the accepted proposals and individual papers. Seven sessions of four concurrent panels each are spread over two days. Four to six presentations are assigned to each panel. All interested persons may submit proposals.

The GPSA has several awards. The McBrayer Award and an accompanying $500.00 cash prize is awarded in years when a paper of outstanding scholarship within the academic discipline of political science is presented in its entirety at the conference. The Donald T. Wells Award is given annually to a member for recognition of outstanding service to the Georgia Political Science Association. The Roger N. Pajari Undergraduate Paper Award is given annually to the best undergraduate paper submitted to meet the requirements of an undergraduate political science course taught in the state of Georgia and nominated by the professor teaching the course.

GPSA members participate in the activities of the American Political Science Association, Southern Political Science Association and the American Society for Public Administration. Question in Politics (QiP) is the scholarly journal of the Georgia Political Science Association. The first volume of QiP was published in 2013 and this journal is the continuation of the earlier Proceedings of the Georgia Political Science Association.

== Past Presidents ==
- Elmo Roberts, 1973
- James McBrayer, 1974
- Frank Smith, 1975
- Ralph Hemphill, 1976
- G.J. Foster, 1977
- Donald T. Wells, 1978
- Larry Elowitz, 1979
- Raymond L. Chambers, 1980
- Ethel A. Cullinan, 1981
- Donald Fairchild, 1982
- Ben DeJanes, 1983
- Lane VanTassel, 1984
- James Russell, 1985
- Loren Peter Beth, 1986
- Roger Pajari, 1987
- Diane Fowlkes, 1988
- Gale Harrison, 1989
- Larry Taylor, 1990
- Thomas Lauth, 1991
- George H. Cox Jr., 1992
- Joe Trachtenberg, 1993
- Sandra Thornton, 1994
- James Peterson, 1995
- Willoughby Jarrell, 1996
- Glenn Abney, 1997
- Jan Mabie, 1998
- Lois Duke Whitaker, 1999
- Michael Baun, 2000
- Charles S. Bullock, III, 2001
- Gwen Wood, 2002
- Michael Digby, 2003
- Adam Stone, 2004
- Scott E. Buchanan, 2005
- Sudha Ratan, 2006
- Karen McCurdy, 2007
- Chris Grant, 2008
- James LaPlant, 2009
- Carol Pierannunzi, 2010
- Greg Domin, 2011
- Thomas E. Rotnem, 2012
- Sandy Reinke, 2013
- Unknown, 2014
- James LaPlant, 2015
- Tamra Ortgies-Young, 2016
- Craig Albert, 2017
- Matthew Hipps, 2018
- Unknown, 2019
- Keith Lee, 2020
- Robert C. Harding, 2021
- Karen Owen, 2022
- Joseph Robbins, 2023
