= Public Works Management & Policy =

Public Works Management and Policy
- Discipline: Public Administration
- Language: English
- Edited by: Richard G. Little

Publication details
- History: 1996-present
- Publisher: SAGE Publications
- Frequency: Quarterly
- Impact factor: (2010)

Standard abbreviations
- ISO 4: Public Works Manag. Policy

Indexing
- ISSN: 1087-724X
- LCCN: 96652944
- OCLC no.: 535496227

Links
- Journal homepage; Online access; Online archive

Public Works Management and Policy is a peer-reviewed academic journal that publishes papers four times a year in the field of Public Administration. The journal's editor is Richard G. Little (University of Southern California). It has been in publication since 1996 and is currently published by SAGE Publications in association with the Section on Transportation Policy and Administration of the Administration of the American Society for Public Administration.

== Scope ==
Public Works Management and Policy is a resource for academics and practitioners in public works and the public and private infrastructure industries. The journal publishes research results, evaluative management innovations, methods of analysis and evaluation and policy issues. Public Works Management and Policy aims to address the planning, financing, development and operations of civil infrastructure systems.

== Abstracting and indexing ==
Public Works Management and Policy is abstracted and indexed in the following databases:

- Business Source Complete
- Business Source Elite
- Business Source Premier
