= R. A. W. Rhodes =

British political scientist (born 1944)

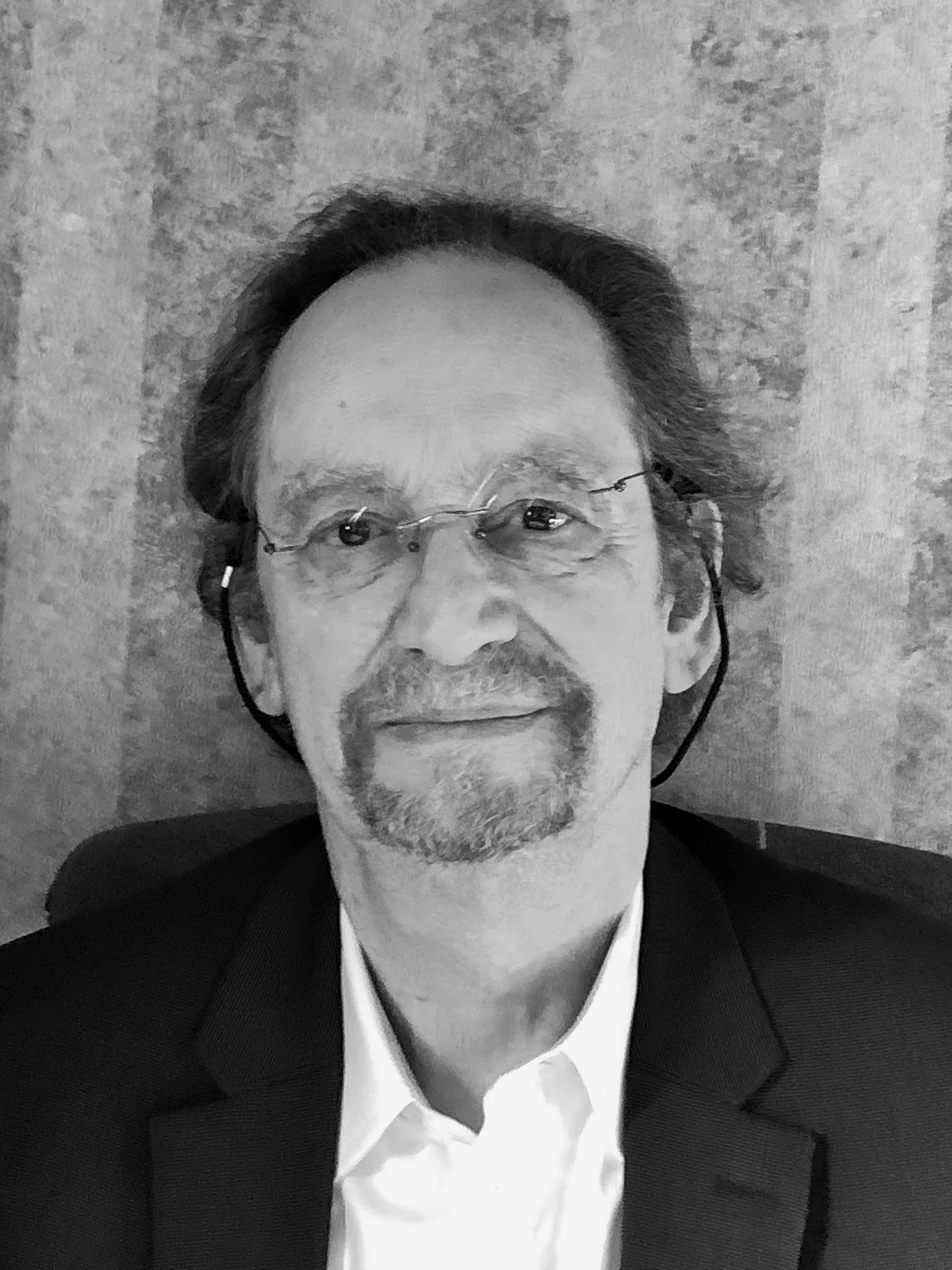
- Rhodes in 2019
- Born: Roderick Arthur William Rhodes; 15 August 1944 (age 82)

Education
- Education: University of Essex; Oxford University

Philosophical work
- Main interests: Political science, public policy, political institutions, public administration, comparative politics
- Notable ideas: Differentiated polity, governance, core executive, policy networks, interpretive political science, decentred theory of governance, political ethnography
- Website: www.raw-rhodes.co.uk

Roderick Arthur William Rhodes (born 15 August 1944), usually cited as R. A. W. Rhodes, is a British professor of political science.

Rod Rhodes is professor of government at the University of Southampton (UK) and director of the Centre for Political Ethnography. He is also emeritus professor of politics at the University of Newcastle (UK). Previously, he was: Professor of Government at Griffith University (2012–2015); director of the UK Economic and Social Research Council’s ‘Whitehall Programme’ (1994–1999); distinguished professor of political science at the Australian National University (2006–11); and director of the Research School of Social Sciences at the Australian National University (2007-8). He is a life Vice-President and former Chair and president of the Political Studies Association of the United Kingdom; a Fellow of both the Academy of the Social Sciences in Australia; and the Academy of Social Sciences (UK). He has also been a Fellow of the Royal Society of Arts, editor of 'Public Administration: an international quarterly' from 1986 to 2011, and Treasurer of the Australian Political Studies Association, 2004–2011.

== Early life and education ==
Rhodes was born in Bradford in the West Riding of Yorkshire. He was educated at a Moravian church school before working as a clerk. After studying at night school, he took a bachelor's degree at Bradford University. He also holds a postgraduate BLitt from Oxford University and a doctorate from Essex University. He emigrated from the United Kingdom to Australia in 2003, returning to the UK in 2012.

== Research ==
Rhodes was influential in developing several ideas in present-day political science.

=== Differentiated polity ===
The idea that British government should be seen as a fragmented or differentiated polity rather than a unitary state has been hugely influential and widely debated. The idea ‘may be becoming the new orthodoxy’.

=== Core executive ===
With Patrick Dunleavy, Rhodes argued the conventional debate about the British executive, with its focus on the relative power of the prime minister and cabinet was too limited. The core functions of the British executive are to pull together and integrate central government policies and to act as final arbiters of conflicts between different elements of the government machine. These functions can be carried out by institutions other than prime minister and cabinet; for example, the Treasury and the Cabinet Office. By defining the core executive in functional terms, the key questions become: ‘who does what?’ and ‘who has what resources?’.

=== Policy networks ===
Rhodes pioneered the analysis of policy networks in British government. The term refers to sets of formal and informal institutional linkages between governmental and other actors structured around shared interests in public policymaking and implementation. These institutions are interdependent. Policies emerge from the bargaining between the networks’ members. The other actors commonly include the professions, trade unions and big business. Central departments need their co-operation because British government rarely delivers services itself. It uses other bodies. Also, there are too many groups to consult so government must aggregate interests. It needs the "legitimated" spokespeople for that policy area. The groups need the money and legislative authority that only government can provide.

=== Governance ===
The term refers to: a new process of governing; or a changed condition of ordered rule; or the new method by which society is governed. Rhodes applied the idea to public administration and public policy to refer the changing boundaries between public, private and voluntary sectors. For many policy arenas, these sectors are interdependent, so decisions are a product of their game-like interactions, rooted in trust and regulated by rules of the game negotiated and agreed by the participants. Such networks have significant degree of autonomy from the state - they are self-organising - although the state can indirectly and imperfectly steer them. In sum, governance refers to governing with and through networks; to network steering. The arguments that there had been a shift from ‘government to governance’, that it was the mix of bureaucracy, markets and networks that mattered, and a consequent ‘hollowing out of the state’ are now referred to, and debated, as ‘the Anglo-governance school’. Rhodes wrote the foundational texts of this school.

=== Interpretive political science ===
Mark Bevir and R. A. W. Rhodes are the authors of Interpreting British Governance (2003) and Governance Stories (2006). They argue that political science must necessarily be an interpretive art. This is because they hold that the starting point of enquiry must be to unpack the meanings, beliefs, and preferences of actors in order to then make sense of understanding actions, practices, and institutions. Political science is therefore an interpretative discipline underpinned by hermeneutic philosophy rather than positivism: there is no ‘science’ of politics, instead all explanations, including those that deploy statistics and models, are best conceived as narratives. Bevir and Rhodes thus provide an elaborate philosophical foundation for a decentred theory of governance woven together by the notions of beliefs, traditions and dilemmas. 'It follows that the role of political scientists is to use (1) ethnography to uncover people's beliefs and preferences, and (2) history to uncover traditions as they develop in response to dilemmas. The product is a story of other people's constructions of what they are doing, which provides actors’ views on changes in government, the economy, and society. So, for example, a political scientist may select a part of the governance process, and then explain it by unpicking various political traditions and how actors within these traditions encounter and act to resolve dilemmas. Governance is thus understood as the contingent and unintended outcome of competing narratives of governance.’

=== A decentred theory of governance ===
For Bevir and Rhodes, decentered theory revolves around the idea of situated agency: institutions, practices or socialisation cannot determine how people behave, so any course of action is a contingent individual choice. People’s actions are explained by their beliefs (or meanings or desires); any one belief is interpreted in the context of the wider web of a person’s beliefs; and these beliefs are explained by traditions and modified by dilemmas. A tradition (or episteme or paradigm) is the set of theories against the background of which a person comes to hold beliefs and perform actions. It is a first influence upon people – a set of beliefs that they inherit and then transform in response to encounters with "dilemmas" (or problems or anomalies). A dilemma arises whenever novel circumstances generate a new belief that forces people to question their previously held beliefs. Change occurs through encountering such dilemmas: while individual responses to dilemmas are grounded in traditions, they then modify just those traditions.'

=== Political ethnography ===
Latterly, Rhodes argued that too few political scientists were engaged in observation and founded the Manchester University Press series on "Political and Administrative Ethnography" to encourage fieldwork in political science. In his own work, he used ethnography as a tool for exploring the beliefs and practices of government actors (see Rhodes, 2007, 2011,2014, 2021 and 2024 in Select Bibliography). His current project focuses on the court politics of recent British prime ministers.

== Honors and awards ==
- 2012 International Research Association for Public Management and Routledge Prize for Outstanding Contribution to Public Management Research.
- 2014 Special Recognition Award by the Political Studies Association of the United Kingdom.
- 2015 Lifetime Achievement Award by the European Consortium for Political Research (ECPR).

== Selected bibliography ==
=== Main Books ===
- Rhodes, R. A. W. (1981). Control and power in central-local government relations. Farnborough, Hants: Gower SSRC. ISBN 9780566003332. Originally published in 1981, reprinted 1983 and 1986, Japanese translation, 1987, reprinted with a new preface and three additional chapters 1999. Reprinted as a 'Routledge Revival' 2018.
- Rhodes, R. A. W. (2003) [1988]. Beyond Westminster and Whitehall: the sub-central governments of Britain (Digital ed.). London Winchester, Massachusetts, USA: Unwin Hyman Allen & Unwin. ISBN 9780043522226.
- Rhodes, R. A. W.; Marsh, David (1992). Policy networks in British government. Oxford Oxford New York: Clarendon Press Oxford University Press, 1992, Digital edition 2011. ISBN 9780198278528.
- Rhodes, R. A. W.; Dunleavy, Patrick (1995). Prime minister, cabinet, and core executive. New York: St. Martin's Press. ISBN 9780333555286.
- Rhodes, R. A. W. (1997). Understanding governance: policy networks, governance, reflexivity, and accountability. Buckingham Philadelphia: Open University Press. ISBN 9780335197279. (Reprinted in 1999, 2001, 2003 (twice), 2008 and 2010. Chineses edition as 著.理解治理:政策网络、治理、反思与问责[M].丁煌,丁方达,译.北京:中国人民大学出版社, 2020).
- Rhodes, R. A. W. (2000). Transforming British government, volume 1: changing institutions (transforming government). Houndmills, Basingstoke, Hampshire New York: Macmillan Press St. Martin's Press. ISBN 9780312235840. and Rhodes, R. A. W. (2000). Transforming British government, volume 2: changing roles and relationships (understanding governance). Houndmills, Basingstoke, Hampshire New York: Macmillan Press St. Martin's Press. ISBN 9780333752432.
- Rhodes, R. A. W.; Bevir, Mark (2003). Interpreting British governance. London New York: Routledge. ISBN 9780415304528.
- Rhodes, R. A. W.; Bevir, Mark (2006). Governance stories. New York, New York London: Routledge. ISBN 9780415459778.
- Rhodes, R. A. W.; Wanna, John; Weller, Patrick (2009). Comparing Westminster. Oxford New York: Oxford University Press. ISBN 9780199563494.
- Rhodes, R. A. W.; Bevir, Mark (2010). The state as cultural practice. Oxford: Oxford University Press. ISBN 9780199580750.
- Rhodes, R, A, W.; tHart, Paul; Noordegraaf, M. (2007). Observing Government Elites: up close and personal. Houndmills, Basingstoke: Palgrave-Macmillan.
- Rhodes, R, A, W. (2011). Everyday Life in British Government (paperback 2015 ed.). Oxford, Basingstoke: Oxford University Press.
- Rhodes, R, A, W.; Tiernan, Anne (2014). Lessons of Governing: a profile of prime ministers' chiefs of staff (hardback ed.). Melbourne: Melbourne University Press.
- Mark Bevir and Rhodes, R. A. W. (Eds.) The Routledge Handbook of Interpretive Political Science Abingdon, Oxon: Routledge, 2015
- R. A. W. Rhodes, Network Governance and the Differentiated Polity. Selected Essays, Volume 1, Oxford: Oxford University Press, 2017
- R. A. W. Rhodes, Interpretive Political Science. Selected Essays, Volume II. Oxford: Oxford University Press, 2017.
- R. A. W. Rhodes (Ed.) Narrative Policy Analysis: Cases in Decentring Policy London: Palgrave-Macmillan 2018
- R. A. W. Rhodes, J. Boswell and J. Corbett The Art and Craft of Comparison Cambridge: Cambridge University Press, 2019
- R. A. W. Rhodes and Hodgett, Susan (Eds.) What Political Science can learn from the Humanities: Blurring Genres Houndmills, Basingstoke: Palgrave Macmillan
- R. A. W. Rhodes, D. Grube and P. Weller, Comparing Cabinets Oxford: Oxford University Press, 2021.
- R. A. W. Rhodes,Prime Ministers' Courts in the Twenty-first Century Oxford: Oxford University Press, 2024.

=== Debates ===
The "interpretive turn" to studying British government is discussed in a symposium in: Rhodes, R. A. W.; Dowding, Keith; Bevir, Mark; Finlayson, Alan; Hay, Colin (May 2004). "The interpretive approach in political science: a symposium". The British Journal of Politics & International Relations. 6 (2): 129–164. doi:10.1111/j.1467-856X.2004.t01-6-00131.x. S2CID 146751696.

The following items are all debates between Rhodes and his critics.

- ‘Interpreting British Governance’, British Journal of Politics and International Relations 6 (2) 2004: 130–36, and Interpretation as Method, Explanation and Critique’, British Journal of Politics and International Relations, 6 (2) 2004: 156–64 in Finlayson, A.,(Ed.) 'The Interpretive Approach to Political Science: A Symposium', British Journal of Politics & International Relations, 6 (2): 129–64.
- Disaggregating ‘Structures as an Agenda for Critical Realism’ British Politics, 1 (3) 2006: 397–403. A reply to McAnulla, S. (2000a) 'Challenging the New Interpretivist Approach: Towards a Critical Realist Alternative', British Politics, 1 (1), 113–38; and McAnulla, S. (2006b) 'Critical Realism, Social Structure and Political Analysis: A Reply to Bevir and Rhodes', British Politics 1 (3), 404-12
- Stairways to Heaven’ Australian Journal of Public Administration 67 (3) 2008: 267–70. A reply to Alford, J. (2008), The Limits to Traditional Public Administration, or Rescuing Public Value from Misrepresentation. Australian Journal of Public Administration 67 (3): 357–366, which, in turn, criticised: ‘‘The Limits to Public Value, or Rescuing Responsible Government from the Platonic Guardians’, Australian Journal of Public Administration 66 (4) 2007: 406–421.
- ‘The Differentiated Polity as Narrative’, British Journal of Politics and International Relations 10 (4) 2008: 729–734. A reply to Marsh, D. (2008) 'Understanding British Government: Analysing Competing Models', British Journal of Politics & International Relations 10 (2): 251–68. There is a further reply from Marsh, D. (2008), What is at Stake? A Response to Bevir and Rhodes. British Journal of Politics & International Relations, 10 (4): 735–739.
- ‘Politics as Cultural Practice’ Political Studies Review 6 (2): 170–77. 2008, in a ‘Symposium on “Governance Stories” and “Interpreting British Governance” by Mark Bevir and R. A. W. Rhodes’ and replying to Smith, M. (2008) 'Re-centring British Government: Beliefs, Traditions and Dilemmas in Political Science', Political Studies Review, 6 (2): 143–54; and Glynos, J. and Howarth, D. (2008), Structure, Agency and Power in Political Analysis: Beyond Contextualised Self-Interpretations, Political Studies Review 6 (2): 155–169.
- ‘Interpretivism and the Analysis of Traditions and Practices’, Critical Policy Studies 6 (2) 2012: 201–208. A reply to Wagenaar, H. ‘Dwellers on the threshold of practice: the interpretivism of Bevir and Rhodes’, Critical Policy Studies 6 (1) 2012: 85–99.
- Rhodes, R. A. W. (August 2007). "Understanding governance: ten years on" (PDF). Organization Studies. 28 (8): 1243–1264. doi:10.1177/0170840607076586. S2CID 145560766.

Finally, two books explore the strengths and weaknesses of the interpretive approach of Bevir and Rhodes:

- Bevir, M. and Rhodes R. A. W. Rethinking Governance: ruling, rationalities and resistance (Abingdon, Oxon: Routledge 2016)
- Turnbull, N. (Ed.), Interpreting Governance, High Politics and Public Policy. (Abingdon, Oxon: Routledge 2016).

== See also ==
- Policy network analysis
