= Trevor Smith, Baron Smith of Clifton =

British politician (1937–2021)

The Right Honourable The Lord Smith of Clifton FRHistS FAcSS FRSA CCMI
- Smith in 2016

Member of the House of Lords
- Lord Temporal
- Life peerage 4 November 1997 – 31 January 2019

Personal details
- Born: Trevor Arthur Smith; 14 June 1937 Clapton, London, England
- Died: 24 April 2021 (aged 83)
- Party: Liberal (1956–88); Liberal Democrats (1988–2021)
- Spouses: Brenda Susan Eustace (m. 1960; div. 1973) Julia Donnithorne Bullock (m. 1979)
- Children: 3
- Education: Chiswick Polytechnic
- Alma mater: London School of Economics
- Occupation: Academic, Political Scientist, Politician

Trevor Arthur Smith, Baron Smith of Clifton, FRHistS, FAcSS, , FRSA, CCMI (14 June 1937 – 24 April 2021) was a British politician, academic and member of the House of Lords. He was the Liberal Democrat spokesman in the House on Northern Ireland and constitutional affairs.

== Early life ==
Smith was born in the East End of London, the son of Arthur James Smith and Vera Gladys Smith (née Cross). He read Economics at the London School of Economics in 1955-8, graduating with a BSc. He worked as a schoolteacher for the London County Council from 1958 to 1959.

== Academic career ==
Smith's first academic post was as an assistant lecturer at the University of Exeter from 1959 to 1960. He then became research officer for the Acton Society Trust in 1960–2, a trust set up by the Joseph Rowntree Social Service Trust in the 1940s "to analyse the implications of the welfare state for liberty and the individual." In 1962, he became a lecturer in politics at the University of Hull, where he would remain for the next five years.

In 1967, Smith moved to Queen Mary College at the University of London, where he was to be based for the next 24 years. Initially a lecturer and then a senior lecturer, he was appointed professor in political studies in 1983. He also served as head of department in politics from 1972 to 1985, and was dean of social studies in 1979–82. By the mid-1980s, he was also playing an administrative role in the university as a whole – he was pro-principal in 1985–87, senior pro-principal in 1987–89, and senior vice-principal in 1989–91.

Smith was an active member of the Political Studies Association since the 1950s, and was its chairman in 1988–89, vice-president in 1989–91, and president in 1991–93.

In 1991, Smith moved to Northern Ireland, to take up the appointment of vice-chancellor of the University of Ulster, which he held until 1999. As the university was Northern Ireland's largest employer, Smith was heavily involved in the Northern Ireland peace process throughout the 1990s, taking a non-sectarian "outsider" role.

== Political activity ==
He was an active member of the Liberal Democrats and its predecessor, the Liberal Party, since 1956. A former chairman of the Union of Liberal Students, he contested the 1959 General Election in West Lewisham, being the youngest candidate of any party that year.

He was a board member of the Joseph Rowntree Social Service Trust Ltd from 1975, and its chair from 1987 to 1999; he retired from the board in 2007. During his time as chair, the trust saw a significant reorientation of its goals as a non-charitable trust geared towards funding political activity around democratic reform and social justice. In order to reflect this, it was renamed the Joseph Rowntree Reform Trust in 1990.

In 1997, he entered the House of Lords as a Liberal Democrat peer, serving as his party's frontbench spokesperson on Northern Ireland from 2000 to 2011. During the 2010–15 coalition government, he emerged as a vocal critic of his party's participation in the coalition, including being one of only four Lib Dem peers to vote against their party's trebling of tuition fees, and calling for the resignation of his party leader, Nick Clegg.

He retired from the House of Lords on 31 January 2019.

== Honours ==
He was created a Knight Bachelor in the 1996 Birthday Honours for services to higher education, receiving the accolade from The Queen on 3 December 1996. He was created a life peer as Baron Smith of Clifton, of Mountsandel in the County of Londonderry, on 4 November 1997. He was made an Honorary Fellow of Queen Mary University of London in 2003.

He received the following honorary degrees:

- Legum Doctor (LLD) from Trinity College Dublin in 1992.
- Legum Doctor (LLD) from the University of Hull in 1993.
- Legum Doctor (LLD) from the University of Belfast in 1993.
- Legum Doctor (LLD) from the National University of Ireland in 1996.
- Doctor of Humane Letters (DHL) from the University of Alabama at Birmingham on 6 December 1998.
- Doctor of Letters (DLitt) from the University of Ulster in 2002.
- Doctor of Science (DSc) from the University of Buckingham in 2019.
- Legum Doctor (LLD) from the University of York in 2021.

== Personal life ==
Smith married Brenda Susan (née Eustace) in 1960, with whom he had two sons; the marriage was dissolved in 1973. In 1979, he married his second wife, Julia Donnithorne (née Bullock), with whom he had one daughter, Naomi Smith of Best for Britain.

== Bibliography ==
=== Books ===
- Trevor Smith with Alison Thomson, Anti-Politics: Consensus, Reform and Protest in Britain (London: Charles Knight, 1972).
- Trevor Smith and Robert Benewick (eds), Direct Action and Democratic Politics (London: Allen & Unwin, 1973).
- Trevor Smith, The Politics of the Corporate Economy (London: M. Robertson, 1979).
- __________, The Fixers: Crisis Management in British Politics (London: Dartmouth, 1996).
- __________, Workhouse to Westminster (London: Caper Press, 2018).

=== Book chapters ===
- Trevor Smith, 'United Kingdom', in Raymond Vernon (ed.), Big Business and the State: Changing Relations in Western Europe (Cambridge, Massachusetts: Harvard University Press, 1974).
- ___________, 'Causes, Concerns and Cures', in F. F. Ridley and Alan Doig (eds), Sleaze: Politicians, Private Interests & Public Reaction (Cambridge: Cambridge University Press, 2009).
- Trevor Smith and Alison Young, 'Politics and Michael Young', in Geoff Dench, Tony Flower and Kate Gavron (eds), Young at Eighty: The Prolific Public Life of Michael Young (Manchester: Carcanet Press, 1995).
- Trevor Smith, 'Britain', in Jack Hayward and Michael Watson (eds), Planning, Politics, and Public Policy: The British, French and Italian Experience (Cambridge: Cambridge University Press, 2009).
- ___________, 'Industrial Planning in Britain', in Jack Hayward and Michael Watson (eds), Planning, Politics, and Public Policy: The British, French and Italian Experience (Cambridge: Cambridge University Press, 2009).

=== Pamphlets ===
- Roger Cuss, Maurice Gent and Trevor Smith, New Unions for Old - New Orbits Pamphlet #6 (London: New Orbits Group, 1961)
- Michael Argyle and Trevor Smith, Training Managers (London: Acton Society Trust, 1962).
- Trevor Smith and Anthony M. Rees, Councillors: A Study of Barking (London: Acton Society Trust, 1964).
- Trevor Smith, Town & County Hall: Problems of Recruitment & Training (London: Acton Society Trust, 1966).
- Trevor Smith (ed.), Economic Dilemmas and Political Choices (London: Acton Society Trust, 1973).
- Trevor Smith, British Politics in the Post-Keynesian Era (London: Acton Society Trust, 1986).
- Paul Hodgson, Archy Kirkwood and Trevor Smith, Directors’ Remuneration and Private Utilities — Centre for Reform Paper No. 11 (London: Centre for Reform, 1999).

=== Peer-reviewed articles ===
- Robert E. Dowse and Trevor Smith, 'Party Discipline in the House of Commons - A Comment', Parliamentary Affairs, 16:2 (December 1962), pp. 159–164.
- Trevor Smith, 'Politics, Economics, and Political Economy', Government and Opposition, 8:3 (July 1973), pp. 263–279.
- __________, 'Thoughts on British Politics', Higher Education Quarterly, 30:4 (September 1976), pp. 462–469.
- __________, 'Zur Verbindung von Gedanke und Tat in der britischen Politik: Der Fall Thatcher', Zeitschrift für Parlamentsfragen, 12:4 (December 1981), pp. 562–572.
- __________, 'White Collar, Blue Collar, Dog Collar: Speculations on the emerging ecclesiastical/industrial complex', Higher Education Quarterly, 39:3 (June 1985), pp. 242–248.
- __________, 'Britain Today: Crisis and Critiques', Parliamentary Affairs, 39:1 (January 1986), pp. 129–132.
- __________, 'Political Science and Modern British Society', Government and Opposition, 21:4 (October 1986), pp. 420–436.
- __________, 'The UGC's Research Rankings Exercise', Higher Education Quarterly, 41:4 (September 1987), pp. 303–316.
- __________, 'Citizenship and the British Constitution', Parliamentary Affairs, 44:4 (October 1991), pp. 429–441.
- __________, 'Post-Modern Politics and the Case for Constitutional Renewal', Political Quarterly, 65:2 (April 1994), pp. 128–137.
- __________, 'Political Sleaze in Britain: Causes, Concerns and Cures', Parliamentary Affairs, 48:4 (October 1995), pp. 551–561.
- __________, 'Citizenship, Community and Constitutionalism', Parliamentary Affairs, 49:2 (April 1996), pp. 262–272.
- Trevor Smith and Alison Young, 'The Fixers: Elite Regeneration as a Response to Crisis Management in Modern British Government', Parliamentary Affairs, 50:2 (April 1997), pp. 292–306.
- Patrick Dunleavy, Helen Margetts, Trevor Smith and Stuart Weir, 'Constitutional Reform, New Labour in Power and Public Trust in Government', Parliamentary Affairs, 54:3, (July 2001), pp. 405–424.
- Trevor Smith, 'How Citizenship got on to the Political Agenda', Parliamentary Affairs, 55:3 (July 2002), pp. 475–487.
- __________, '‘Something Old, Something New, Something Borrowed, Something Blue’: Themes of Tony Blair and his Government', Parliamentary Affairs, 56:4 (October 2003), pp. 580–596.

=== Journalistic articles ===
- Trevor Smith, 'A momentous day in the Lords', OpenDemocracy, 14 October 2008.
- __________, 'Conservatives will polarise Northern Ireland politics', OpenDemocracy, 7 December 2008.
- __________, 'Northern Ireland's crisis needs more democracy, not less', OpenDemocracy, 9 January 2010.
- __________, 'Will the Tories try to buy off the nats to block PR?', OpenDemocracy, 4 May 2010.
- __________, 'Why I defied the Whips and voted against my government’s education policy', OpenDemocracy, 17 December 2010.
- __________, 'We Lib Dems cannot return to "business as usual"', OpenDemocracy, 9 May 2011.
- __________, 'Unelected Oligachy: corporate and financial power in Britain under the spotlight', OpenDemocracy, 23 August 2011.
- __________, 'Trends and tendencies in contemporary UK politics and the future of the Lib Dems', Social Liberal Forum, 10 January 2012.
- Trevor Smith and Naomi Smith, 'Save Our Party from the Precipice! A Lib Dem's Plan for Recovery', OpenDemocracy, 31 January 2012.
- Trevor Smith, 'War with Iran? How Should Britain Proceed?', OpenDemocracy, 31 January 2012.
- __________, 'Cameron's damage control strategy will further humiliate the Lib Dems', OpenDemocracy, 6 September 2012.
- __________, 'Bereft of Ideas', Liberator, 351, February 2012, p. 20.
- __________, 'Prime Minister as a mid-career job: what consequence for Britain?', OpenDemocracy, 10 February 2012.
- __________, 'Whither the Lib Dems? Withering!', OpenDemocracy, 7 May 2012.
- __________, 'Lib Dem prospects', OpenDemocracy, 15 September 2013.
- __________, 'Even Bobbing Corks Sink Eventually', Liberator, 366, June 2014, pp. 8–9.
- __________, 'The challenge facing the Liberal Democrats', OpenDemocracy, 17 June 2015.
- __________, 'Politics against democracy: tracing the roots of Brexit', OpenDemocracy, 18 July 2016.
- __________, 'How Universities Sold Their Souls', Liberator, 388, January 2018, pp. 12–13.
- __________, 'After Carillion, can capitalism clean up its act? Or will Marx have the final word?', OpenDemocracy, 15 February 2018.
- __________, 'Land of the Robber Barons', Liberator, 389, March 2018, pp. 12–13.
- __________, 'The Withering of Democracy', Liberator, 391, August 2018, pp. 8–10.
- __________, 'Polarised Britain in a Polarised World', Liberator, 392, September 2018, pp. 24–25.
- __________, 'An Arranged Marriage, Contemporary-Style', Liberator, 393, November 2018, p. 17.
- __________, 'Paddy Ashdown: a frank remembrance', OpenDemocracy, 15 January 2019.
- __________, 'Staring Us in the Face', Liberator, 402, July 2020, pp. 12–13.
- __________, 'Taking Care of Business', Liberator, 405, February 2021, p. 32.

== Arms ==
Coat of arms of Trevor Smith, Baron Smith of Clifton

Crest
A sacred ibis’s head Proper gorged with a plain collar Or.
Escutcheon
Sable between two haunches Argent fretty Sable four fusils conjoined in pale throughout each per pale Argent and Or per chevron counterchanged.
Supporters
On either side a sacred ibis Proper gorged with a plain collar Or.
Motto
Faber Meae Fortunae
