= Colin Hay (political scientist) =

British political scientist (born 1968)

- Born: 9 November 1968 (age 58)
- Awards: Political Studies Association W J M Mackenzie Book Prize for the best political science book 2007

Academic work
- Main interests: Political science

Colin Hay (born 9 November 1968) is Professor of Political Sciences at Sciences Po, Paris and Affiliate Professor of Political Analysis at the University of Sheffield, joint editor-in-chief of the journal Comparative European Politics. and Managing Editor of the journal New Political Economy.

== Education ==
Hay studied Social and Political Science at Clare College, Cambridge, and moved to the Department of Sociology at Lancaster University to research for his PhD degree under the supervision of Bob Jessop.

== Career ==
After completing his doctorate, Hay worked at the University of Birmingham, where he was head of the Department of Political Science and International Studies between 2002 and 2005. He moved to Paris in 2013.

== Selected bibliography ==
=== Books ===
- Hay, Colin (1996). Re-stating Social and Political Change. Buckingham England Philadelphia: Open University Press. ISBN 9780335193868.
- David Marsh; Jim Buller; Colin Hay; Jim Johnston; Peter Kerr; Stuart McAnulla; Matthew Watson; et al. (1999). Postwar British Politics in Perspective. Cambridge, UK Malden, Massachusetts: Polity. ISBN 9780745620305.
- Hay, Colin (1999). The Political Economy of New Labour: Labouring Under False Pretences. Manchester: Manchester University Press. ISBN 9780719054822.
- Hay, Colin (2002). Political Analysis: A Critical Introduction. Houndmills, Basingstoke, Hampshire New York: Palgrave. ISBN 9780333750032.
- Hay, Colin (2007). Why We Hate Politics. Cambridge, United Kingdom: Polity Press. ISBN 9780745630991.
- Hay, Colin (2010). New Directions in Political Science: Responding to the Challenges of an Interdependent World. London: Palgrave. ISBN 9780230228481.
- Hay, Colin (2013). The Failure of Anglo-Liberal Capitalism. London: Palgrave. ISBN 9781137360502.
- Hay, Colin; Wincott, Daniel (2015). The Political Economy of European Welfare Capitalism. London: Palgrave. ISBN 9781403902245.
- Hay, Colin; Payne, Anthony (2015). Civic Capitalism. Cambridge, United Kingdom: Polity Press. ISBN 9780745692074.
- Hay, Colin (2018). Globalization and the State: Rhetoric and Reality. London: Palgrave. ISBN 9781403913012.

As editor:

- O'Brien, Martin; Penna, Sue; Hay, Colin, eds. (1998). Theorising Modernity: Reflexivity, Environment and Identity in Gidden's Social Theory. London: Routledge. ISBN 9780582307438.
- Hay, Colin; Marsh, David, eds. (2000). Demystifying Globalization. London: Palgrave. ISBN 9780333968574.
- Hay, Colin, ed. (2002). British Politics Today. Cambridge Malden, Massachusetts: Polity in association with Blackwell. ISBN 9780745623191.
- Hay, Colin; Marsh, David; Lister, Michael, eds. (2006). The State: Theories and Issues. Houndmills, Basingstoke, Hampshire New York: Palgrave Macmillan. ISBN 9781403934260.
- Hay, Colin; Dunleavy, Patrick; Heffernan, Richard; Cowley, Philip, eds. (2006). Developments in British politics 8. Houndmills, Basingstoke, Hampshire New York: Palgrave Macmillan. ISBN 9781403948434.
- Hay, Colin; Menon, Anand, eds. (2007). European Politics. Oxford New York: Oxford University Press. ISBN 9780199284283.
- Hay, Colin; Flinders, Matthew; Gamble, Andrew, eds. (2011). The Oxford Handbook of British Politics. Oxford New York: Oxford University Press. ISBN 9780199604449.
- Farrall, Stephen; Hay, Colin, eds. (2014). The Legacy of Thatcherism: Assessing and Exploring Thatcherite Social and Economic Policies. Oxford New York: Oxford University Press. ISBN 9780197265703.
- Hay, Colin; Green, Jeremy; Taylor-Gooby, Peter, eds. (2015). The British Growth Crisis: The Search for a New Model. Oxford New York: Oxford University Press. ISBN 9781137441515.
- Fawcett, Paul; Flinders, Matthew; Hay, Colin; Wood, Matthew, eds. (2017). Anti-Politics, Depoliticization, and Governance. Oxford New York: Oxford University Press. ISBN 9780198748977.
- Hay, Colin; Hunt, Tom, eds. (2017). The Coming Crisis. New York: Springer Publishing. ISBN 9783319638133.
- Hay, Colin; Bailey, Daniel, eds. (2019). Diverging Capitalisms: Britain, the City of London and Europe. London: Palgrave. ISBN 9783030034146.

Hay won the Political Studies Association W J M Mackenzie Book Prize for the best political science book published in 2007 at the 2008 PSA Awards.

=== Journal articles ===
- Hay, Colin; Rosamond, Ben; Schain, Martin A. (March 2003). "Editorial". Comparative European Politics. 1 (1). Palgrave Macmillan: 1–4. doi:10.1057/palgrave.cep.6110005.
- Hay, Colin; Finlayson, Alan; Bevir, Mark; Rhodes, R. A. W.; Dowding, Keith (May 2004). "The interpretive approach in political science: a symposium". The British Journal of Politics & International Relations. 6 (2). Wiley: 129–164. doi:10.1111/j.1467-856X.2004.t01-6-00131.x. S2CID 146751696.
