= Alan Finlayson =

British political scientist

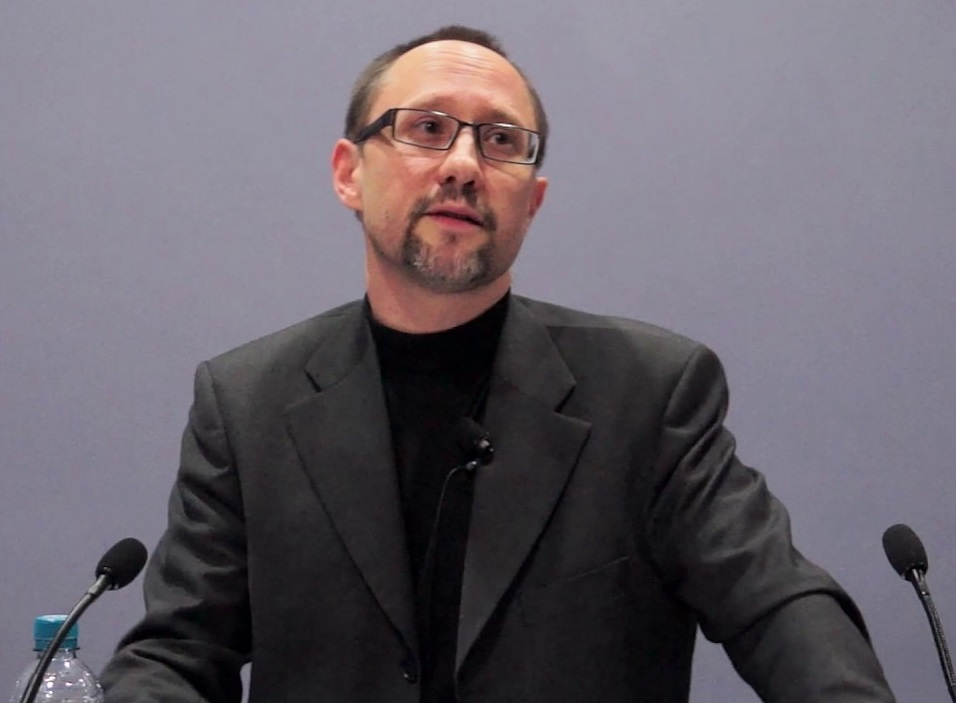
- Citizenship: British
- Awards: Bernard Crick Prize for Best Piece 2014

Academic background
- Education: Trinity College, Cambridge (M.A.Cantab. Social and Political Sciences); Queen's University Belfast (Ph.D. Political Science)

Academic work
- Institutions: Queen's University Belfast (1992-1999) Swansea University (1999-2012); University of East Anglia (2012-present)
- Main interests: Political science, Rhetoric
- Notable works: Making Sense of New Labour
- Notable ideas: Rhetorical political analysis
- Website: people.uea.ac.uk/a_finlayson

Alan Finlayson is a British political theorist and political scientist. He is Professor of Political and Social Theory at The University of East Anglia in the United Kingdom, having previously taught in the Department of Political and Cultural Studies at Swansea University, and the Department of Politics and International Relations at Queen's University Belfast. He is a leading advocate of rhetorical political analysis and of its importance for the study of British politics.

== Rhetorical political analysis ==
Finlayson is a noted advocate of the development of Rhetorical political analysis within British political studies. He promotes the close study of political speech and argument on the grounds that this is a way of understanding the history and development of political ideologies. He is responsible for the website British Political Speech which archives political speeches and promotes the study of political oratory in the UK. In 2015 his essay "Proving, Pleasing and Persuading? Rhetoric in Contemporary British Politics" was awarded the Bernard Crick Prize for the best article in the journal Political Quarterly. In 2023 his article "YouTube and Political Ideologies: Technology, Populism and Rhetorical Form" was awarded the Harrison Prize from the Political Studies Association for the best article in the journal Political Studies.

== Responsibilities ==
Finlayson was convenor of the Post-Structuralism and Radical Politics specialist group of the Political Studies Association from 1999 to 2009. He is currently Treasurer of the Rhetoric and Politics Specialist Group of the PSA, a member of the Rhetoric Society of America's Internationalization Task Force and of the steering group of the Rhetoric Society of Europe. He is also a Trustee of the Barry Amiel and Norman Melburn Trust. and a Director of the left-wing publisher Lawrence and Wishart.

== Selected bibliography ==
=== Media journal articles ===
- Finlayson, Alan (31 January 2011). "The philosophical significance of UKUncut". Open Democracy | Our Kingdom.
- Finlayson, Alan (27 May 2011). "Should the left go Blue? Making sense of Maurice Glasman". Open Democracy | Our Kingdom.
- Finlayson, Alan (29 November 2021). "Sleaze is just a symptom – democratic politics in the UK is dying". The Guardian. London, United Kingdom. ISSN 0261-3077.

=== Academic journal articles ===
- Finlayson, Alan (2004). "Political science, political ideas and rhetoric". Economy and Society. 33 (4): 528–549. doi:10.1080/0308514042000285279. S2CID 145507753.
- Finlayson, Alan; Bevir, Mark; Rhodes, R. A. W.; Dowding, Keith; Hay, Colin (May 2004). "The interpretive approach in political science: a symposium". The British Journal of Politics & International Relations. 6 (2): 129–164. doi:10.1111/j.1467-856X.2004.t01-6-00131.x. S2CID 146751696.
- Finlayson, Alan (November 2007). "From beliefs to arguments: interpretive methodology and rhetorical political analysis". The British Journal of Politics & International Relations. 9 (4): 545–563. doi:10.1111/j.1467-856X.2007.00269.x. S2CID 144417511.
- Atkins, J., Finlayson, A. (2013) ‘... A 40-Year-Old Black Man Made the Point to Me’: Everyday Knowledge and the Performance of Leadership in Contemporary British Politics in Political Studies 61. pp. 161–177.
- Finlayson, A. (2014) Proving, Pleasing and Persuading? Rhetoric in Contemporary British Politics in The Political Quarterly 85. pp. 428–436
