= Joni Lovenduski =

British academic

- Born: 1945 (age 80–81)

Academic work
- Institutions: Birkbeck, University of London
- Main interests: Gender and politics, British politics, and comparative politics

Joni Lovenduski, FBA (born 1945) is Professor Emerita of Politics at Birkbeck, University of London.

She was previously Anniversary Professor of Politics at Birkbeck (2000-2016), Professor of Politics at the University of Southampton (1995-2000) and Professor of Comparative Politics at Loughborough University (1993-5). She was made a Fellow of the British Academy in 2007. In the same year she received the Special Recognition Award from the Political Studies Association of the United Kingdom. She was presented with the Gender and Politics Award by the European Consortium for Political Research Standing Group on Gender and Politics in 2009.

== Career ==
Lovenduski has held academic appointments at institutions across Europe and the US. She has been Chair of the Editorial Board of Political Quarterly since 2009. She is a member of the editorial boards of British Politics, The British Journal of Political Science, and French Politics. In 2010 Lovenduski founded the Centre for the Study of British Politics and Public Life at Birkbeck. She was the Centre director until 2016.

== Honours ==
In 2007, Lovenduski was elected a Fellow of the British Academy (FBA), the UK's national academy for the humanities and the social sciences. She was awarded the Sir Isaiah Berlin Prize for Lifetime Contribution to Political Studies by the Political Studies Association in 2013. In 2017 Lovenduski was the recipient of the ECPR Lifetime Achievement Award. The jury recognised "the crucial role [she] has played in defining and developing the field of gender and politics within political science."

Lovenduski's work has been widely influential in feminist political science. A collection of essays reviewing key themes in Lovenduski's work, Deeds and Words: Gendering Politics After Joni Lovenduski, was published in 2014.

In 2017, The Political Studies Association named its prize for outstanding professional achievement by a mid career scholar in her honour to recognise Professor Lovenduski's significant contributions to the PSA and the wider discipline, in particular to the study of gender and politics; and in recognition of her commitment to generous mentoring and championing of junior scholars in the profession.

== Selected works ==
Lovenduski has written extensively on gender and politics, British politics, and comparative politics.

=== Books ===
- Lovenduski, Joni (1986). Women and European Politics: Contemporary Feminism and Public Policy. Amherst: University of Massachusetts Press. ISBN 9780870235085.
- Lovenduski, Joni; Randall, Vicky (1993). Contemporary Feminist Politics: Women and Power in Britain. Oxford New York: Oxford University Press. ISBN 9780198780694.
- Lovenduski, Joni (2005). Feminizing Politics. Oxford Malden, Massachusetts: Polity. ISBN 9780745624624.z
- Lovenduski, Joni (2015). Gendering Politics, Feminising Political Science. Colchester: ECPR Press. ISBN 9781910259146.

=== Journal articles ===
- Lovenduski, Joni; Margetts, Helen; Abrar, Stefania (April 1998). "Sexing London: the gender mix of urban policy actors". International Political Science Review. 19 (2): 147–171. doi:10.1177/019251298019002005. S2CID 144543148.
- Lovenduski, Joni; Margetts, Helen; Abrar, Stefania (May 2000). "Feminist ideas and domestic violence policy change". Political Science. 48 (2): 239–262. doi:10.1111/1467-9248.00258. PMID 18286750. S2CID 2621367.
- Lovenduski, Joni (2008). "State Feminism and Women's Movements". West European Politics. 31 (1–2): 164–194. doi:10.1080/01402380701834978. S2CID 145241126.
- Lovenduski, Joni; Campbell, Rosie; Childs, Sarah (January 2010). "Do Women Need Women Representatives?". British Journal of Political Science. 40 (1): 171–194. doi:10.1017/S0007123409990408.
- Lovenduski, Joni (December 2012). "Prime Minister's Questions as Political Ritual". British Politics. 7 (4): 314–340. doi:10.1057/bp.2012.13. S2CID 153358341.
- Lovenduski, Joni (July 2016). "The Supply and Demand Model of Candidate Selection: Some Reflections". Government and Opposition. 51 (3): 513–528. doi:10.1017/gov.2016.7. S2CID 156298402.

=== Essays in edited collections ===
- Lovenduski, Joni; Childs, Sarah (2012). Celis, Karen; et al. (eds.). The Oxford Handbook of Gender and Politics. Oxford: Oxford University Press. ISBN 9780199751457.
- Lovenduski, Joni (2013). "United Kingdom: Male Dominance Broken?". In Dahlerup, Drude; et al. (eds.). Breaking Male Dominance in Old Democracies. Oxford: Oxford University Press. ISBN 9780199653898.
