= Helen Margetts =

Political scientist, University of Oxford

Helen Margetts OBE FBA
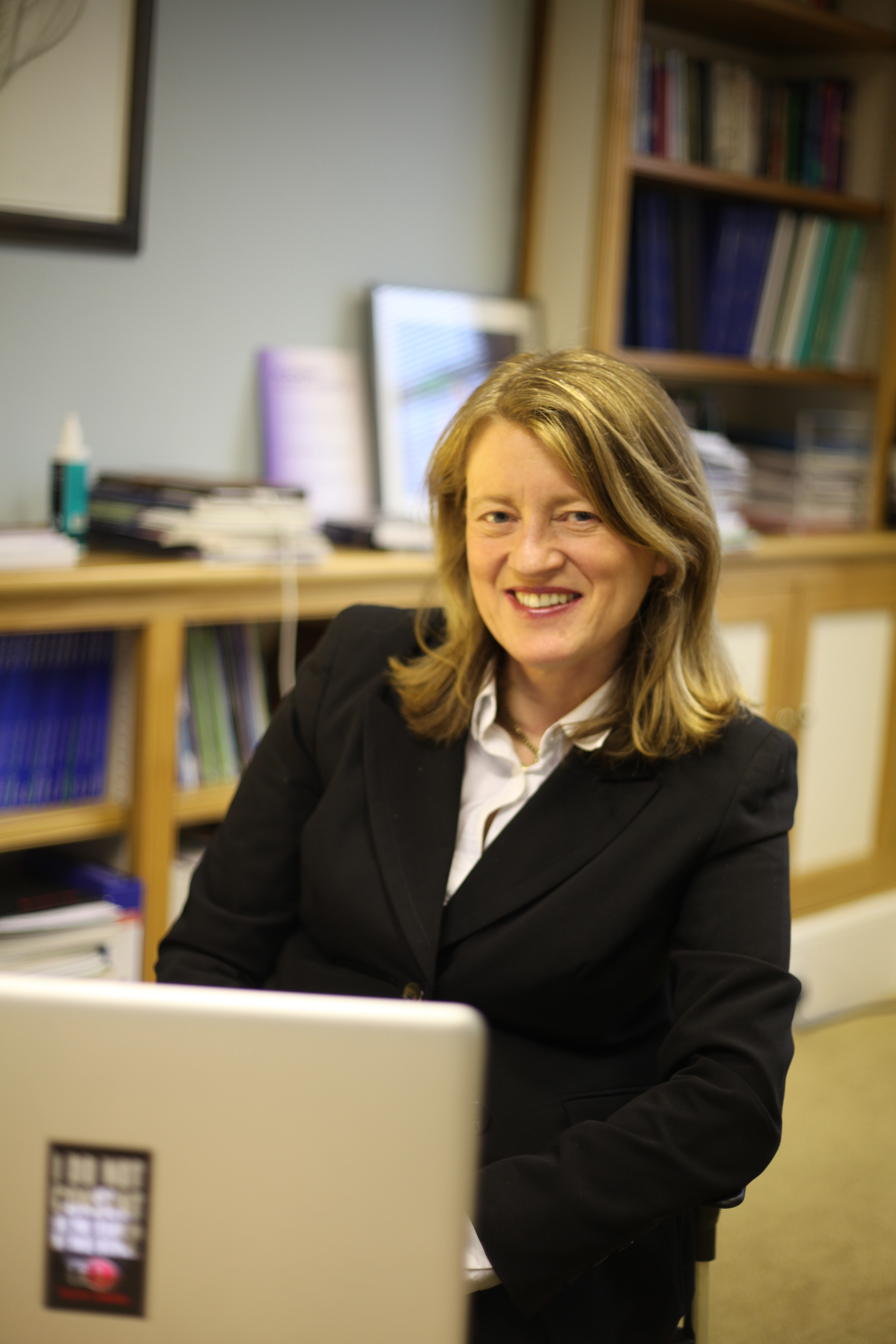
- Helen Margetts in Oxford
- Born: Helen Zerlina Margetts; 15 September 1961 (age 65)
- Awards: FBA (2019) OBE (2019) Friedrich Schiedel Prize (2018) Political Scientists Making a Difference award (with Patrick Dunleavy) by the UK Policy Studies Association (2003)

Academic background
- Education: London School of Economics and Political Science
- Thesis: Computerisation in American and British central government 1975-95: policy-making, internal regulation and contracting in information technology (1996)

Academic work
- Main interests: Political science
- Website: www.oii.ox.ac.uk/people/helen-margetts

Helen Zerlina Margetts OBE FBA (born 15 September 1961) is Professor of Political Science and Public Policy at the London School of Economics and Director of the LSE Data Science Institute. Prior to LSE, she was Professor of Internet and Society at the Oxford Internet Institute (OII), University of Oxford and from 2011 to 2018 was Director of the OII. She was formerly Director of the Public Policy Programme at The Alan Turing Institute. She is a political scientist specialising in digital era governance and politics, and has published over a hundred books, journal articles and research reports in this field.

== Career ==
Margetts obtained her first degree, a BSc in mathematics, from the University of Bristol. In her early career she was a computer programmer and systems analyst with Rank Xerox, after which she took up postgraduate study at the London School of Economics. There she earned a MSc in Politics and Public Policy (awarded in 1990) and a PhD in Government (in 1996). From 1994 to 1999 she lectured at Birkbeck College, London.

Margetts is Professor of Internet and Society at the University of Oxford, a fellow of Mansfield College and from 2011 to 2018 was Director of the Oxford Internet Institute (OII). Prior to joining the OII in October 2004, she was a Professor in Political Science and Director of the Public Policy Programme at University College London.

Amongst her research projects at the OII, she has used a variety of methods to investigate how the Internet can affect the relationship between citizens and government, and how informational cues can affect the success of online petitions and charity fundraising. In March 2011 she was an expert witness for the UK Parliament's Public Administration Select Committee's investigation into the cost of publicly funded information technology projects.

Margetts was a Fellow of The Alan Turing Institute and Director of the Public Policy Programme at the from 2018-2025.

Margetts sits on the UK Government's Digital Economy Council, the Home Office Scientific Advisory Council, the board of the Ada Lovelace Institute, and (from 2011-2015) the Government Digital Advisory Board.

She was appointed to the Order of the British Empire (OBE) in the 2019 New Year Honours. In 2019, she was elected as a Fellow of the British Academy.

== Bibliography ==
Books

Margetts has co-authored a series of books which have helped to define the field of digital-era governance:

- Margetts, Helen; John, Peter; Hale, Scott A.; Yasseri, Taha (2016). Political turbulence: how social media shape collective action. Princeton, New Jersey: Princeton University Press. ISBN 978-0-691-15922-5.
- Margetts, Helen; Perri 6; Hood, Christopher (2010). Paradoxes of modernization: unintended consequences of public policy reform. Oxford New York: Oxford University Press. ISBN 978-0-19-957354-7.
- Margetts, Helen; Dunleavy, Patrick; Bastow, Simon; Tinkler, Jane (2008). Digital era governance: IT corporations, the state, and e-government. Oxford: Oxford University Press. ISBN 978-0-19-954700-5.
- Margetts, Helen Z.; Hood, Christopher C. (2007). The tools of government in the digital age. Basingstoke: Palgrave Macmillan. ISBN 978-0-230-00143-5.
- Margetts, Helen; Dunleavy, Patrick; Weir, Stuart; Trevor, Smith (2005). Voices of the people: popular attitudes to democratic renewal in Britain. London: Politico's. ISBN 978-1-84275-134-3.
- Margetts, Helen; Dowding, Keith; Hughes, James (2001). Challenges to democracy: ideas, involvement, and institutions. The Political Studies Association Yearbook 2000. Houndmills, Basingstoke, Hampshire New York: Palgrave. ISBN 978-0-333-78982-7.
- Margetts, Helen (1999). Information technology in government: Britain and America. London New York: Routledge. ISBN 978-0-203-20803-8.
- Margetts, Helen Zerlina (1996). Computerisation in American and British central government 1975-95: policy-making, internal regulation and contracting in information technology (Ph.D. thesis). University of London. OCLC 556741174.
- Margetts, Helen; Smyth, Gareth, eds. (1994). Turning Japanese?: Britain with a permanent party of government. London: Lawrence & Wishart. ISBN 978-0-85315-785-4.

Chapters in books

- Margetts, Helen; Dowding, Keith; Hughes, James (2001), "Introduction", in Margetts, Helen; Dowding, Keith; Hughes, James (eds.), Challenges to democracy: ideas, involvement, and institutions, The Political Studies Association Yearbook 2000, Houndmills, Basingstoke, Hampshire New York: Palgrave, pp. xi–xvii, ISBN 978-0-333-78982-7. Pdf.

Journal articles

- Margetts, Helen Z.; John, Peter; Hale, Scott A. (June 2015). "Leadership without leaders? Starters and followers in online collective action". Political Studies. 63 (2): 277. arXiv:1308.0237. doi:10.1111/1467-9248.12211. S2CID 220122299.
- Margetts, Helen; Dunleavy, Patrick (February 2013). "The second wave of digital-era governance: a quasi-paradigm for government on the Web". Philosophical Transactions of the Royal Society A. 371 (1987): 0382. Bibcode:2013RSPTA.37120382M. doi:10.1098/rsta.2012.0382. PMID 23419851.
- Margetts, Helen Z. (2011). "Experiments for public management research". Public Management Review. 13 (2): 189–208. doi:10.1080/14719037.2010.532970. S2CID 153521362.
- Margetts, Helen Z.; John, Peter; Escher, Tobias (November 2011). "Social information and political participation on the internet: an experiment". European Political Science Review. 3 (3): 321–344. doi:10.1017/S1755773911000129. S2CID 154496802.
- Margetts, Helen (October–December 2011). "The internet and transparency". The Political Quarterly. 82 (4): 518–521. doi:10.1111/j.1467-923X.2011.02253.x.
- Margetts, Helen Z. (December 2009). "The internet and public policy". Policy & Internet. 1 (1): 1–21. doi:10.2202/1944-2866.1029.
- Margetts, Helen Z.; John, Peter (2009). "The latent support for the extreme right in British politics". West European Politics, the Politics of Conflict Management in EU Regulation. 32 (3): 496–513. doi:10.1080/01402380902779063. S2CID 154830316.
- Margetts, Helen; Dunleavy, Patrick; Bastow, Simon; Tinkler, Jane (2008). "Australian e-Government in comparative perspective". Australian Journal of Political Science. 43 (1): 13–26. doi:10.1080/10361140701842540. S2CID 155065922.
- Margetts, Helen; Dunleavy, Patrick; Bastow, Simon; Tinkler, Jane (July 2006). "New public management is dead – long live digital-era governance". Journal of Public Administration Research and Theory. 16 (3): 467–494. doi:10.1093/jopart/mui057.
- Margetts, Helen (April 2006). "E-Government in Britain – a decade on". Parliamentary Affairs. 59 (2): 250–265. doi:10.1093/pa/gsl003.
- Margetts, Helen; Dunleavy, Patrick (October 2005). "The impact of UK electoral systems". Parliamentary Affairs. 58 (4): 854–870. doi:10.1093/pa/gsi068.
- Margetts, Helen Z.; John, Peter (September 2003). "Policy punctuations in the UK: fluctuations and equilibria in central government expenditure since 1951". Public Administration. 81 (3): 411–432. doi:10.1111/1467-9299.00354.
- Margetts, Helen; Dunleavy, Patrick (July 2001). "From majoritarian to pluralist democracy?: Electoral reform in Britain since 1997". Journal of Theoretical Politics. 13 (3): 295–319. doi:10.1177/095169280101300304. S2CID 153985975.
- Margetts, Helen; Lovenduski, Joni; Abrar, Stefania (May 2000). "Feminist ideas and domestic violence policy change". Political Science. 48 (2): 239–262. doi:10.1111/1467-9248.00258. PMID 18286750. S2CID 2621367.
- Margetts, Helen Z.; Goetz, Klaus H. (October 1999). "The solitary center: the core executive in Central and Eastern Europe". Governance. 12 (4): 425–453. doi:10.1111/0952-1895.00112.
- Margetts, Helen; Dunleavy, Patrick (April 1999). "Mixed electoral systems in Britain and the Jenkins Commission on electoral reform". British Journal of Politics and International Relations. 1 (1): 12–38. doi:10.1111/1467-856X.00002. S2CID 154860419.
- Margetts, Helen; Dunleavy, Patrick; King, Desmond; Dowding, Keith; Rydin, Yvonne (March 1999). "Regime politics in London local government". Urban Affairs Review. 34 (4): 515–545. doi:10.1177/10780879922184068. S2CID 154446712.
- Margetts, Helen; Lovenduski, Joni; Abrar, Stefania (April 1998). "Sexing London: the gender mix of urban policy actors". International Political Science Review. 19 (2): 147–171. doi:10.1177/019251298019002005. S2CID 144543148.
- Margetts, Helen (October 1997). "The 1997 British general election: New labour, new Britain?". West European Politics. 20 (4): 180–191. doi:10.1080/01402389708425224.

Papers

- Margetts, Helen Z.; John, Peter; Hale, Scott A.; Yasseri, Taha (2018). "How digital design shapes political participation: A natural experiment with social information". PLOS ONE. 13 (4) e0196068. arXiv:1408.3562. Bibcode:2018PLoSO..1396068H. doi:10.1371/journal.pone.0196068. PMC 5922527. PMID 29702664. SSRN 2454570.

== Awards ==
In July 2019 Helen was elected a Fellow of the British Academy (FBA). In March–April she held the John F Kluge Senior Chair in Technology and Society at the Library of Congress, Washington DC. She was awarded an OBE for services to social and political science in the 2019 New Year's Honours List.

In 2018 she was awarded the Friedrich Schiedel Prize by the Technical University of Munich, for research and research leadership in politics and technology.

Her co-authored book Political Turbulence won the W.J.Mckenzie Prize of the UK Political Studies Association for best politics book in 2017.

She was elected a Fellow of the Academy of Social Sciences in 2011.

In 2003 Margetts and Patrick Dunleavy were presented with the 'Political Scientists Making a Difference' award by the UK Policy Studies Association, in recognition for their work on a series of policy reports assessing the state of Government on the Internet for the UK National Audit Office.
