= A Government that Worked Better and Cost Less? =

2015 book by Christopher Hood and Ruth Dixon

A Government That Worked Better and Cost Less? Evaluating Three Decades of Reform and Change in UK Central Government
- Author: Christopher Hood and Ruth Dixon
- Subject: New Public Management
- Publisher: Oxford University Press
- Publication date: 2 April 2015
- Publication place: United Kingdom
- Pages: 256
- ISBN: 978-0-19-968702-2

A Government That Worked Better and Cost Less? Evaluating Three Decades of Reform and Change in UK Central Government is a book written by Christopher Hood and Ruth Dixon, and published by Oxford University Press in 2015. The authors attempt to assess the success of three decades of New Public Management, which was intended to create "a government that works better and costs less", concluding that "The short answer seems to be: higher costs and more complaints". The book was described by Michael Moran as "brilliant, highly original", and he concluded that "Future researchers will see further precisely because they will be able to stand on the shoulders of these scholars". In November 2015 the book was awarded the Louis Brownlow Book Award of the National Academy of Public Administration "for its comprehensive study of reform, cost and performance". In November 2016 it was awarded the W. J. M. Mackenzie award of the Political Studies Association, the jury stating that the book "carries considerable implications for policy-making, as well as the field of academic enquiry which it addresses." The book was repeatedly cited in Michael Barber's report Delivering better outcomes for citizens: practical steps for unlocking public value.

In a review published in Civil Service World, and subsequently republished in Total Politics, Austin Mitchell wrote that "the message of this book is clear and simple: don’t believe the messianic idea merchants who tell us that their reforms will put everything right, or that if you make senior civil servants managers and delivery boys rather than policy wonks, all will be well". Sir David Bell summarised the conclusions for Times Higher Education as "Rather prosaically, but perhaps unsurprisingly, Hood and Dixon conclude that, actually, government has cost a bit more and worked a bit worse over the period". Writing for the LSE Review of Books Tom Thatcham described the book as "required reading for students of New Public Management". In The Guardian David Walker described the authors as "ingenious" and "painstaking". The book received four separate reviews in the academic journal Governance, and further reviews in the Journal of Contemporary European Studies, in Political Studies Review, and in Social Policy & Administration.
