= The Art of the State =

The Art of the State: Culture, Rhetoric, and Public Management
- Author: Christopher Hood
- Language: English
- Subject: Public administration
- Publisher: Oxford University Press
- Publication date: 9 July 1998
- Publication place: United Kingdom
- Pages: 276
- ISBN: 978-0198297659

The Art of the State: Culture, Rhetoric, and Public Management is a book written by Christopher Hood, first published by Oxford University Press in 1998 with a revised edition published in 2000. In November 1998 it was awarded the W. J. M. Mackenzie award of the Political Studies Association.

Writing in Public Administration Richard J. Stillman II described the book as "a timely and important book, by one of Europe’s most respected administrative scholars". In a review in the International Public Management Journal Eugene Bardach wrote that "For intellectual scope and ambition, The Art of the State is almost without peer in the recent public management literature".
