= Joke Swiebel =

Dutch policy analyst, writer, politician and activist

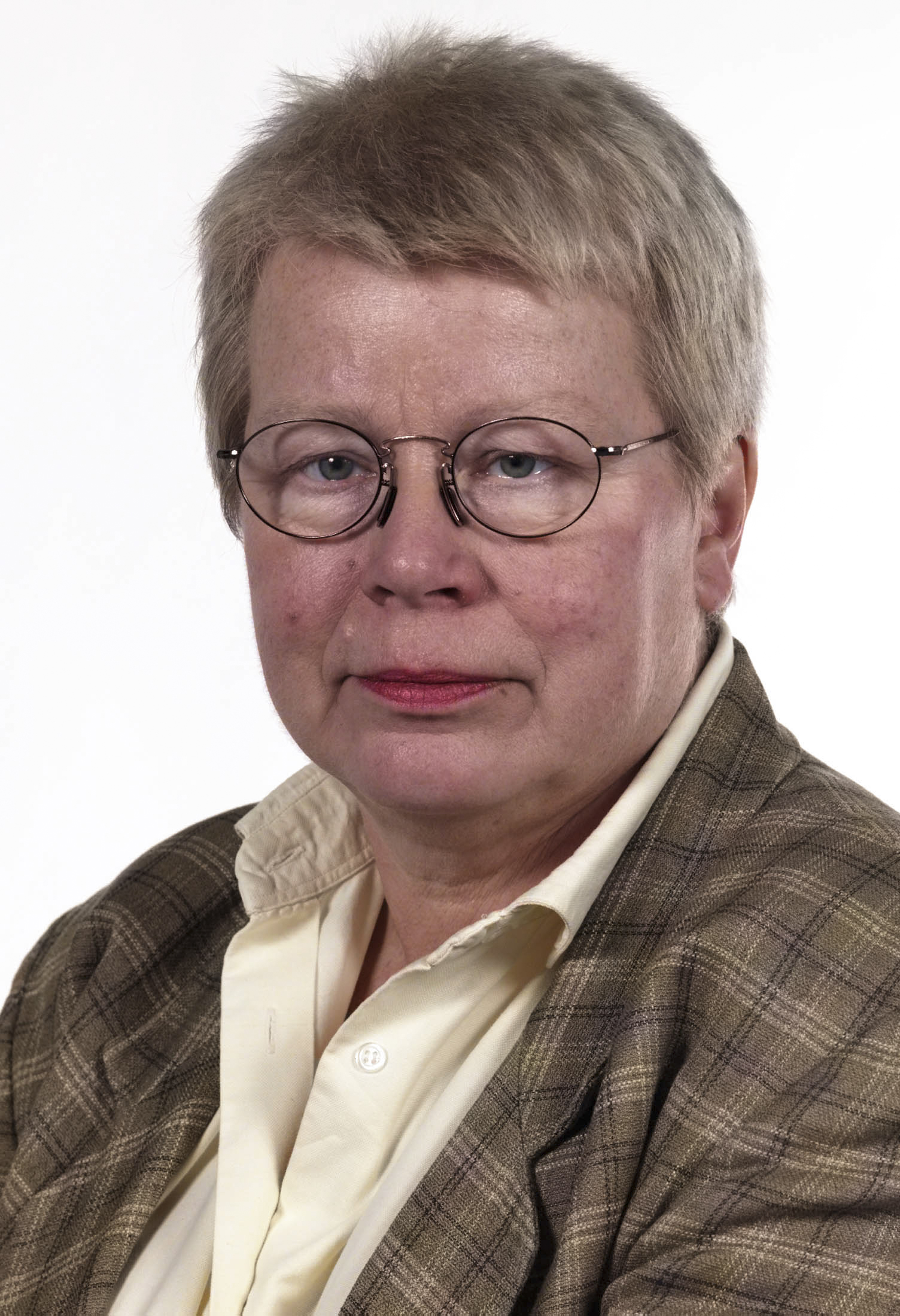
- Swiebel in 1999

Member of the European Union for the Netherlands
- In office 20 July 1999 – 19 July 2004

Personal details
- Born: 28 November 1941 (age 84) The Hague, Netherlands
- Party: Dutch Labour Party

Joke Swiebel (born 1941) is a Dutch political scientist, and a former policy maker, politician and activist. Since the 1960s, she has been involved with the feminist and LGBT movements. She served as first chair of the Federation of Student Working Groups on Homosexuality and on the board of the COC Nederland while a student. In the former capacity, she was one of the organizers of the first LGB demonstration in the Netherlands — and probably all of Europe — which was held on 21 January 1969. It was a protest against a discriminatory provision in the Criminal Code, introduced in 1911, that set a significantly higher age of consent for homosexual than for heterosexual contact.After earning her master's degree in 1972 from the University of Amsterdam, she led the political science library at that institution until 1977. She was involved in the creation of the women's studies program at the university and worked to coordinate between activist groups to ensure that neither gender or sexual orientation were the basis for discriminatory policies.

From 1977, Swiebel worked at various government departments on policies for gender equality. From 1988, she simultaneously led the Dutch delegation for the United Nations Commission on the Status of Women and was a representative to the 1995 Beijing World Conference on Women. In 1999, Swiebel was elected to serve as a Member of the European Parliament for the Dutch Labour Party, which she did through 2004. Her focus was on human rights policy and she participated in discussions, introduced legislation, and wrote reports during her tenure regarding migration, women's rights, LGBT inclusion, and other issues. In 2006, she was one of the lead drafters of the Declaration of Montreal. Her written works have focused on policy and human rights implementation. In 2019, she was awarded the Jos Brink Oeuvre Prize for her lifetime of contributions to the LGBT community from the Dutch government.

== Early life and education ==
Joke Swiebel was born on 28 November 1941 in The Hague, Netherlands. Her mother worked as a kindergarten teacher prior to marriage and her father, Cornelis Marinus Swiebel, served as the general secretary of the Social Security Council. He also was a member of the South Holland Provincial Council. A grandfather had served as a Social Democratic Workers' Party (SDWP) member of the Hague City Council. She attended the Montessori Lyceum in the Hague, graduating in 1960 and continued her education at the University of Amsterdam where she studied political science. In 1963, Swiebel joined the Dutch Labour Party, which was a successor of the SDAP. She earned a master's degree in 1972. On 26 January 2024, at the age of 82, she obtained a PhD at the University of Amsterdam, by defending a dissertation in which she analyses four legislative changes that mark the post-war history of homosexuality in the Netherlands: the repeal of Article 248bis of the Penal Code (1971), the General Equal Treatment Act (1994), the opening up of marriage to same-sex couples (2001) and the addition of 'sexual orientation' to Article 1 of the Constitution (2023).

== Career and activism ==
In 1968, Swiebel was elected as the national chair of the newly formed Federatie Studenten Werkgroepen Homoseksualiteit (Federation of Student Working Groups on Homosexuality, FSWH). It was an umbrella organization, which coordinated activist associations of LGBT students in Dutch universities. In cooperation with a progressive youth center, the FSWH organized the first LGBT demonstration in the Netherlands and probably throughout Europe. On 21 January 1969 the demonstrators handed out a pamphlet and candy hearts to the members of the States General of the Netherlands at the Binnenhof in the Hague to protest Article 248bis of the Dutch Criminal Code. The article, introduced in 1911, established the age of consent for same-sex relations at 21 and for heterosexual relations at 16, as a method of discouraging homosexuality. From 1969 to 1971, and from 1973 to 1975, she was on the board of the Cultuur en Ontspanningscentrum (Culture and Leisure Center, COC), which had been established in 1946 as a shelter and prudent advocacy organization for 'homophiles'. Swiebel belonged to an action group (Nieuw Lila, i.e. 'New Lilac') that wanted to steer the COC in a more socially critical direction.

Swiebel ran the political science library at the University of Amsterdam between 1972 and 1977. From 1973, she worked for feminist groups like the Man Vrouw Maatschappij, coordinating actions to include sexual orientation in the fight against discrimination. In 1974 and 1975, she served on the University of Amsterdam's 'Grewel Committee', which proposed to introduce the university's first women's studies program. In 1977, she began to work on the national emancipation committee, a government body that aimed to establish policy for women's equality. She served as a senior civil servant at the Department for the Co-ordination of Emancipation Policy (DCE) in the Ministry of Social Affairs and Employment in 1982 and served in that capacity until 1995. Simultaneously, Swiebel began serving as the head of the Dutch delegation for the United Nations Commission on the Status of Women in 1988 and was the vice chair of the commission in 1992 and 1993. She continued her service until 1995 and that year participated in the Dutch government's delegation to the United Nations' World Conference on Women, held in Beijing. The purpose of the conference was to create a strategic plan for the global efforts to support women's right to self-determination.

From 1995, Swiebel worked in various positions at the Ministry of Social Affairs and Employment, simultaneously serving as the chair of the Council of Europe's Steering Committee for Equality between 1989 and 1995. In 1999, she was elected as a Member of the European Parliament for the Dutch Labour Party and served until 2004. During her tenure, Swiebel was involved in legislation and produced reports which focused on free movement of persons throughout the European Union (EU), including asylum and migration laws. She proposed anti-discrimination legislation and an expansion of the EU Charter of Fundamental Rights. She worked on expanding equal opportunities for, and equal treatment of all persons in the member states and stressed the need to analyze the impact of anti-terrorism policies on human rights, noting that police misconduct and judicial deficiencies often impacted citizen's rights.

After retiring from politics, Swiebel continued her activism, inter alia as Co-President o the International Conference on LGBT Human Rights, hosted at the 2006 World Outgames in Montreal. She was one of the primary drafters of the Declaration of Montreal. Her published works focus on human rights and policy. In articles such as Lesbian, Gay, Bisexual and Transgender Human Rights: The Search for an International Strategy, she has analyzed the different stances between the EU and the UN with regard to their ability to protect rights. Scholars like Elizabeth Baisley and Kathleen A. Lahey have noted Swiebel's conclusion that the diversity in member states of the UN makes its policies more susceptible to conservative, traditional and religious pressures than those policies adopted by member states of the EU. Among many other contributions, she served as the chair of the Dutch Coordination of the European Women’s Lobby and on the board of the International Archives for the Women's Movement from 2005 to 2007. The following year, she became chair of the International Gay and Lesbian Information Center and Archive, serving until 2012. Between 2013 and 2017, Swiebel was chair of the Clara Wichmann Association for Women and Law. In 2019, Swiebel was awarded the Ministry of Emancipation's Jos Brink Oeuvre Prize, for her lifetime of work on behalf of the LGBT community.

== Selected works ==
- Swiebel, Joke (April 1988). "The Gender of Bureaucracy: Reflections on Policy-Making for Women". Politics. 8 (1). London: Political Studies Association: 14–19. doi:10.1111/j.1467-9256.1988.tb00230.x. ISSN 0263-3957. OCLC 5960354836. S2CID 145558531.
- Swiebel, Joke (1999). Unpaid Work and Policy-Making: Towards a Broader Perspective of Work and Employment (Report). New York, New York: United Nations Department of Economic and Social Affairs. OCLC 44610822.
- Swiebel, Joke (12 December 2002). Report on the Human Rights Situation in the European Union (PDF) (Report). Strasbourg, France: European Parliament. Report A5-0451/2002. Archived (PDF) from the original on 5 June 2022.
- Swiebel, Joke (17 December 2003). Report on Equal Opportunities for Women and Men in the European Union (PDF) (Report). Strasbourg, France: European Parliament. Report A5-0481/2003. Archived (PDF) from the original on 5 June 2022.
- Swiebel, Joke (2009). "2. The European Union's Policies to Safeguard and Promote Diversity". In Prügl, Elisabeth; Thiel, Markus (eds.). Diversity in the European Union (1st ed.). New York, New York: Palgrave Macmillan. pp. 21–38. ISBN 978-0-230-10416-7.
- Swiebel, Joke (March 2009). "Lesbian, Gay, Bisexual and Transgender Human Rights: The Search for an International Strategy". Contemporary Politics. 15 (1). London: Taylor & Francis: 19–35. doi:10.1080/13569770802674196. ISSN 1356-9775. OCLC 362957296. S2CID 154229358.
- Swiebel, Joke; van der Veur, Dennis (December 2009). "Hate Crimes against Lesbian, Gay, Bisexual and Transgender Persons and the Policy Response of International Governmental Organisations". Netherlands Quarterly of Human Rights. 27 (4). Utrecht, Netherlands: Studie- en Informatiecentrum Mensenrechten: 485–524. doi:10.1177/016934410902700403. ISSN 0924-0519. OCLC 7023054990. S2CID 151457434.
- Swiebel, Joke (September 2019). "Het einde van artikel 248bis Kantelpunt in de relatie tussen de homobeweging en de overheid" [The End of Article 248bis: Tipping Point in the Relationship between the Gay Movement and the Government]. Tijdschrift voor Genderstudies (in Dutch). 22 (3). Amsterdam, Netherlands: Amsterdam University Press: 231–248. doi:10.5117/TVGN2019.3.002.SWIE. ISSN 1388-3186. OCLC 8275599479. S2CID 214397883.
