= Christopher Hood =

British professor of politics and international relations (1947–2025)

Christopher Hood CBE FBA
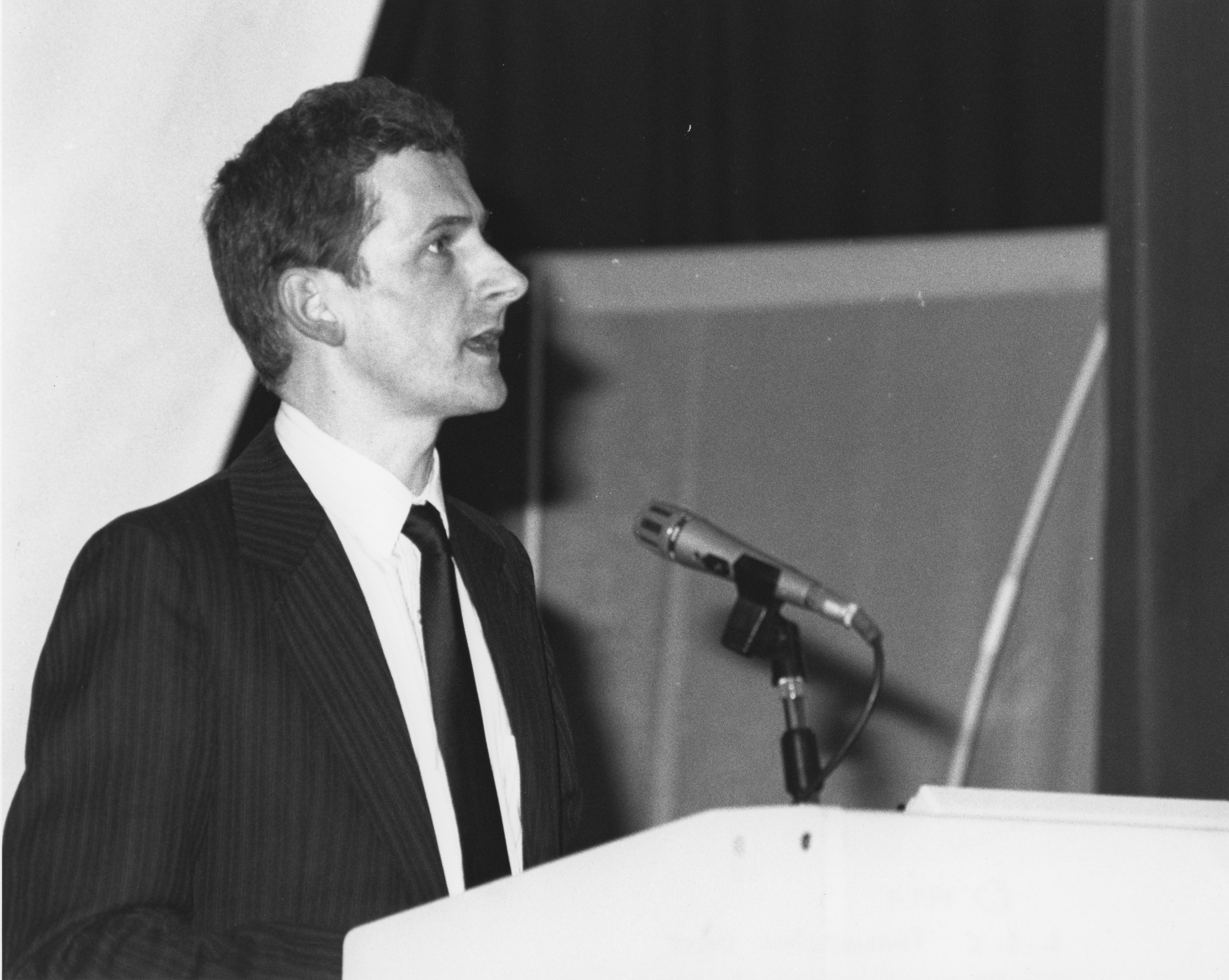
- Hood in 1990
- Born: Christopher Cropper Hood; 1947
- Died: 3 January 2025 (aged 77); Scotland
- Awards: W. J. M. Mackenzie Prize (1998 and 2016); Louis Brownlow Book Award (2015)

Academic background
- Education: University of York; University of Glasgow

Academic work
- Institutions: London School of Economics; All Souls College, Oxford
- Main interests: Executive government New public management
- Website: www.christopherhood.net

Christopher Cropper Hood CBE FBA (1947 – 3 January 2025) was a visiting professor of the Blavatnik School of Government at the University of Oxford, and an Emeritus Fellow of All Souls College, Oxford. Hood was Gladstone Professor of Government at All Souls College, Oxford, from 2001 to 2014, and director of the ESRC Research Programme Public Services: Quality, Performance and Delivery from 2004 to 2010. His books include The Limits of Administration (1976), The Tools of Government (1983) (updated as The Tools of Government in the Digital Age (2007) with Helen Margetts), The Art of the State (1998 and 2000) and A Government that Worked Better and Cost Less? (2015, with Ruth Dixon). He chaired the Nuffield Council on Bioethics' Working Party on medical profiling and online medicine from 2008 to 2010.

He specialised in the study of executive government, regulation and public-sector reform and wrote on New Public Management. Outside his academic work, he was a member of the Gaelic Society of London and of the Gaelic Congregation in London.

== Education ==
Hood obtained a B.A. degree (first-class honours) in Social Sciences from the University of York in 1968, and a B.Litt. degree from the University of Glasgow in 1971. He was awarded a D.Litt. degree from the University of York in 1987.

== Awards ==
The Art of the State was awarded the 1998 W. J. M. Mackenzie award of the Political Studies Association. He was appointed Commander of the Order of the British Empire (CBE) in the 2011 Birthday Honours. A Government that Worked Better and Cost Less? was awarded the 2015 Louis Brownlow Book Award of the National Academy of Public Administration and the 2016 W. J. M. Mackenzie award. In 2017, Hood was awarded an honorary doctorate (Dr.h.c.) from the Erasmus University Rotterdam, "for his contribution to the development of the field of Public Administration in general and in the Netherlands in particular". In 2021 he received the John Gaus award from the Public Administration Section of the American Political Science Association. The Way the Money Goes received the 2025 W. J. M. Mackenzie award.

== Death ==
Hood died in Scotland on 3 January 2025.

== Selected bibliography ==
- Hood, Christopher (1976). The Limits of Administration. London: Wiley. ISBN 9780471016526.
- Hood, Christopher (1983). The Tools of Government. London: Macmillan. ISBN 9780333343968.
- Hood, Christopher (1998). The Art of the State: Culture, Rhetoric and Public Management. Oxford: Clarendon Press. ISBN 9780198280408.
- Hood, Christopher; Margetts, Helen (2007). The Tools of Government in the Digital Age. London: Palgrave Macmillan. ISBN 9780230001442.
- Hood, Christopher (2011). The Blame Game: Spin, Bureaucracy and Self-Preservation in Government. Princeton University Press. ISBN 9780691129952.
- Hood, Christopher; Dixon, Ruth (2015). A Government that Worked Better and Cost Less?. Oxford University Press. ISBN 9780199687022.
- Hood, Christopher; Himaz, Rozana (2017). A Century of Fiscal Squeeze Politics: 100 Years of Austerity, Politics, and Bureaucracy in Britain. Oxford University Press. ISBN 9780198779612.
- Hood, Christopher; King, Maia; McLean, Iain; Piotrowska, Barbara Maria (2025). The Way the Money Goes: The Fiscal Constitution and Public Spending in the UK. Oxford University Press. ISBN 9780198865087.
