= Martin van Hees =

Dutch philosopher (born 1964)

- Born: Martin Vinzenz Baldur Paul Maria van Hees; 26 July 1964 (age 62); Beilen, The Netherlands

Education
- Education: Radboud University Nijmegen

Philosophical work
- Institutions: VU University Amsterdam, Amsterdam University College
- Main interests: Ethics
- Website: Official website

Martin Vinzenz Baldur Paul Maria (Martin) van Hees (born 26 July 1964 in Beilen) is a Dutch philosopher.

Van Hees was professor of ethics at the University of Groningen and since April 2013 professor of political theory at the University of Amsterdam. He received a VICI-grant from the Netherlands Organisation for Scientific Research (NWO) to further research and develop the program Modelling Freedom: Formal Analysis and Normative Philosophy. Van Hees is a vegetarian.

In August 2014, van Hees became professor of Ethics at VU University Amsterdam. He is also a senior editor of the journal Economics and Philosophy. In 2016, van Hees became Dean of the John Stuart Mill College of the VU Amsterdam and programme director for the VU's recently established Philosophy, Politics & Economics Bachelor's programme. Since 1 March 2021, van Hees became Dean of Amsterdam University College.

van Hees disputes the claim that there exists an incompatibility between Pareto efficiency and liberalism (Arrow's impossibility theorem). He suggests that the paradox can be solved through legal-political games which add the right to stay passive on a given issue.

== Education ==
After receiving degrees in political science and philosophy at the Erasmus University in Rotterdam, van Hees obtained his PhD in social sciences at the Radboud University Nijmegen in 1994 with the dissertation: Rights, liberalism and social choice: a logical and game-theoretical analysis of individual and collective rights.

Van Hees became a member of the Royal Netherlands Academy of Arts and Sciences in 2013.

== Bibliography ==
=== Books ===
- Van Hees, Martin (1994). Rights, liberalism and social choice: a logical and game-theoretical analysis of individual and collective rights. Amsterdam: Nijmegen. ISBN 9789090075914.
- van Hees, Martin (1995). Rights and decisions: formal models of law and liberalism. Dordrecht Boston: Kluwer Academic. ISBN 9780792337546.
- Van Hees, Martin (2000). Legal reductionism and freedom. Dordrecht Boston: Kluwer Academic Publishers. ISBN 9780792364917.
- Van Hees, Martin; Robeyns, Ingrid; Nys, Thomas (2014). Basisboek ethiek. Amsterdam, Holland: Uitgeverij Boom. ISBN 9789461059321.

=== Chapters in books ===
- Van Hees, Martin; Roy, Olivier (2008), "Intentions and plans in decision and game theory", in Verbeek, Bruno (ed.), Reasons and intentions, Aldershot, England Burlington, VT: Ashgate, pp. 207–226, ISBN 9780754660040
- Van Hees, Martin (2010), "Some general results on responsibility for outcomes", in van Deemen, Adrian; Rusinowska, Agnieszka (eds.), Collective decision making views from social choice and game theory, Berlin London: Springer, pp. 99–110, ISBN 9783642028656

=== Journal articles ===
- Van Hees, Martin; Dowding, Keith (May 2003). "The construction of rights". American Political Science Review. 97 (2). Cambridge Journals: 281–293.
- Van Hees, Martin; Anand, Paul (April 2006). "Capabilities and achievements: an empirical study". The Journal of Socio-Economics: Special Section - the Socio-Economics of Happiness. 35 (2): 268–284. doi:10.1016/j.socec.2005.11.003.
- Van Hees, Martin; Dowding, Keith (July 2007). "Counterfactual success and negative freedom". Economics and Philosophy. 23 (2): 141–162. doi:10.1017/S0266267107001344. S2CID 144287719.

- Response article by Ian Carter and Matthew H. Kramer Ian, Carter; Kramer, Matthew H (March 2008). "How changes in one's preferences can affect one's freedom (and how they cannot): a reply to Dowding and Van Hees". Economics and Philosophy. 24 (1): 81–96. doi:10.1017/S0266267108001685. S2CID 145074189.

- Van Hees, Martin; Dowding, Keith (March 2008). "Counterfactual success again: response to Carter and Kramer". Economics and Philosophy. 24 (1): 97–103. doi:10.1017/S0266267108001697. hdl:10440/648. S2CID 155013245.
- Van Hees, Martin; Dowding, Keith (January 2008). "In praise of manipulation". British Journal of Political Science. 38 (1): 1–15. doi:10.1017/S000712340800001X. S2CID 55855857.
- Van Hees, Martin; Dowding, Keith; Anand, Paul; Hunter, Graham; Carter, Ian; Guala, Francesco (2009). "The development of capability indicators" (PDF). Journal of Human Development and Capabilities. 10 (1): 125–152. doi:10.1080/14649880802675366. S2CID 215796524.
