= John W. Patty =

American political scientist

- Awards: Herbert Simon Award (APSA), William H. Riker Book Prize

Academic background
- Education: California Institute of Technology (MS, PhD); University of North Carolina-Chapel Hill (BA)
- Thesis: Voting Games of Incomplete Information (2001)
- Doctoral advisor: Thomas Palfrey
- Other advisors: Richard McKelvey, Jeffrey Scot Banks, Kim Border

Academic work
- Discipline: Political science
- Institutions: Carnegie Mellon University; Harvard University; Washington University in St. Louis; University of Chicago; Emory University
- Website: https://www.johnwpatty.net/

John W. Patty is an American political scientist and Professor of Political Science and Quantitative Theory & Methods at Emory University.

A graduate of the North Carolina School of Science and Mathematics, he graduated from the University of North Carolina at Chapel Hill with a double major in Economics and Mathematics, and earned a Masters and PhD in Economics and Social Science from California Institute of Technology.

He is a winner of the William H. Riker Book Prize and the Herbert Simon Award (APSA) for his book Learning While Governing: Expertise and Accountability in the Executive Branch with Sean Gailmard. Patty is a Co-editor with Torun Dewan of the Journal of Theoretical Politics.

== Books ==
- Learning While Governing: Information, Accountability, and Executive Branch Institutions, with Sean Gailmard, University of Chicago Press 2012
- Social Choice and Legitimacy: The Possibilities of Impossibility, with Elizabeth Maggie Penn, Cambridge University Press 2014
