= Jim Hughes (political scientist) =

Irish professor

- Born: James Raymond Hughes; 1959 (age 66–67); Belfast, Northern Ireland

Academic background
- Education: B.A (Hons) Queen's University Belfast, 1977-82; PhD London School of Economics, 1982-7
- Thesis: Bolsheviks and peasants in Siberia and the end of N.E.P.: a study of the grain crisis of 1927/28 (1987)
- Doctoral advisor: Professor Peter Reddaway, Professor Dominic Lieven

Academic work
- Institutions: Trinity College Dublin (1988-9), Keele University (1989-94), London School of Economics, 1994-present
- Main interests: Comparative politics Democratisation of the former Soviet Union and the Balkans, Political Violence and Terrorism, Post-Conflict Reconciliation
- Website: http://personal.lse.ac.uk/HUGHESJ

James Raymond Hughes is professor of comparative politics at the London School of Economics (LSE). Hughes' research interests relate to political violence and terrorism, secession, national and ethnic conflict in the former Soviet Union, the Balkans, and Northern Ireland.

== Education ==
Hughes studied Political Science and Ancient History at Queen's University Belfast, and graduated with a BA (Hons) First-Class in 1982. He was awarded two university prizes. Subsequently, he was awarded a Department of Education Northern Ireland scholarship to study for a PhD at the LSE (1982-7), and was supervised first by Professor Peter Reddaway, and then by Professor Dominic Lieven. While at LSE, he studied Russian language at the School of Slavonic and East European Studies. In 1985-6 he held a British Council Scholarship and was a student at Moscow State University, USSR, where he worked in Soviet archives.

== Selected publications ==
=== Books ===
- Hughes, James (1987). Bolsheviks and peasants in Siberia and the end of N.E.P.: a study of the grain crisis of 1927/28 (Ph.D. thesis). London School of Economics. OCLC 940324605.
- Hughes, James (1991). Stalin, Siberia, and the crisis of the New Economic Policy. Cambridge New York: Cambridge University Press. ISBN 9780521380393. Excerpt.
- Hughes, James (1996). Stalinism in a Russian province: a study of collectivization and dekulakization in Siberia. New York Basingstoke: St. Martin's Press in association with the Centre for Russian and East European Studies, University of Birmingham. ISBN 9780333657485.
- Hughes, James; Dowding, Keith; Margetts, Helen (2001). Challenges to democracy: ideas, involvement, and institutions. The Political Studies Association Yearbook 2000. Houndmills, Basingstoke, Hampshire New York: Palgrave. ISBN 9780333789827.
- Hughes, James; Sasse, Gwendolyn, eds. (2002). Ethnicity and territory in the former Soviet Union: regions in conflict. Cass series in regional and federal studies. London Portland, Oregon: Frank Cass. ISBN 9780714682105.
- Hughes, James; Sasse, Gwendolyn; Gordon, Claire E. (2004). Europeanization and regionalization in the EU's enlargement to Central and Eastern Europe: the myth of conditionality. Series: One Europe or several?. Houndmills, Basingstoke, Hampshire New York: Palgrave Macmillan. ISBN 9781403939876.
- Hughes, James (2007). Chechnya: from nationalism to jihad. National and ethnic conflict in the 21st century series. Philadelphia: University of Pennsylvania Press. ISBN 9780812240139.
- Hughes, James, ed. (2012). EU conflict management. London: Routledge. ISBN 9780415814836.

=== Journal articles ===
- Hughes, James (Spring 1994). "Capturing the Russian peasantry: Stalinist grain procurement policy and the "Ural-Siberian Method"". Slavic Review. 53 (1): 76–103. doi:10.2307/2500326. JSTOR 2500326. S2CID 161585977.
- Hughes, James (2007). "Quotas for women in elected legislatures: Do they really empower women?" (PDF). Demokratizatsiya: The Journal of Post-Soviet Democratization. 15 (3): 293–311. doi:10.3200/DEMO.15.3.293-311.
- Hughes, James (2013). "Russia and the secession of Kosovo: power, norms and the failure of multilateralism". Europe-Asia Studies. 65 (5): 992–1016. doi:10.1080/09668136.2013.792448. S2CID 154632469.
