= Patrick Dunleavy =

British political scientist

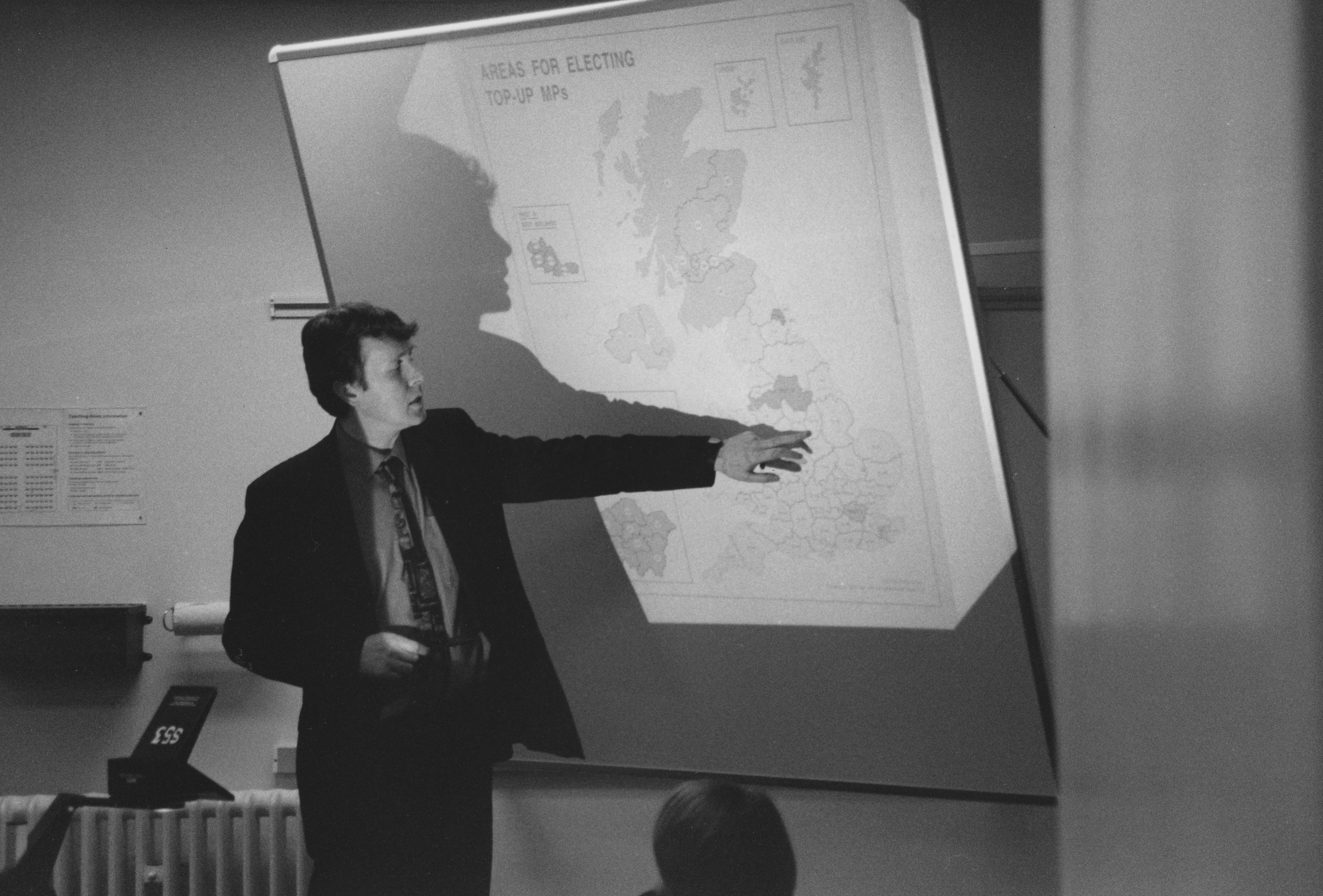
- Dunleavy lecturing in the 1990s
- Born: Patrick John Dunleavy; 21 June 1952 (age 74)

Education
- Education: Nuffield College, University of Oxford
- Thesis: The politics of high rise housing in Britain : local communities tackle mass housing (1978)

Philosophical work
- Institutions: London School of Economics
- Main interests: Political science
- Website: Official website

Patrick John Dunleavy (born 21 June 1952) is Emeritus Professor of Political Science and Public Policy within the Government Department of the London School of Economics and Political Science (LSE). He was also Co-Director of the Democratic Audit and the Chair of the LSE Public Policy Group. In addition Dunleavy is an ANZSOG Institute for Governance Centenary Chair at the University of Canberra, Australia.

== Life and career ==
As an undergraduate Patrick Dunleavy studied Philosophy, Politics and Economics at Corpus Christi College, Oxford, graduating in 1973. He moved to Nuffield College, Oxford to work on his doctoral thesis which was published in 1981 as The Politics of Mass Housing in Britain, 1945-75: Study of Corporate Power and Professional Influence in the Welfare State.

Dunleavy is a prominent political theorist specialising in the fields of public policy and government. His research has focused on the concepts of sectors and sectoral conflicts, rational choice theories of politics, the bureau-shaping model of bureaucracy, and the claimed contemporary public management paradigm of digital era governance. Dunleavy is a frequent blogger on the LSE's British Politics and Policy site and has had an active Twitter account since 2010 commentating predominately on British politics. He is also former joint editor-in-chief of the academic journal Global Policy.

Dunleavy is also the author of advice texts for humanities and social sciences students, most notably his book Authoring a PhD: How to plan, draft, write and finish a doctoral dissertation or thesis (2003).

In June 2014 Dunleavy examined how costly it would be to set up an independent Scottish state as lead author of the report Transitioning to a New Scottish State commissioned by The Sunday Post. Both the Yes and No camps in the independence debate claimed the report to differing extents validated their own arguments and figures. Dunleavy has since declared publicly that the UK Treasury "badly misrepresents" his research.

== Editorships of journals ==
- Global Policy

== Selected publications ==
Books

- Dunleavy, Patrick; O'Leary, Brendan (1987). Theories of the state: the politics of liberal democracy. Basingstoke: Macmillan Education. ISBN 9780333386989.
- Dunleavy, Patrick (1991). Democracy, bureaucracy and public choice: economic explanations in political science. New York London: Harvester. ISBN 9780745002330.
- Dunleavy, Patrick; Margetts, Helen; Weir, Stuart; Trevor, Smith (2005). Voices of the people: popular attitudes to democratic renewal in Britain. London: Politico's. ISBN 9781842751343.
- Dunleavy, Patrick; Heffernan, Richard; Cowley, Philip; Hay, Colin, eds. (2006). Developments in British politics (series 1–8). Houndmills, Basingstoke, Hampshire New York: Palgrave Macmillan. ISBN 9781403948434.
- Dunleavy, Patrick (2006). Digital era governance: IT corporations, the state, and e-government. Oxford New York: Oxford University Press. ISBN 9780199296194.
- Dunleavy, Patrick; Margetts, Helen; Bastow, Simon; Tinkler, Jane (2008). Digital era governance: IT corporations, the state, and e-government. Oxford: Oxford University Press. ISBN 9780199547005.
- Dunleavy, Patrick; Dryzek, John, eds. (2009). Theories of the democratic state. Basingstoke, Hampshire New York: Palgrave Macmillan. ISBN 9780230542860.
- Dunleavy, Patrick; Kippin, Sean; Suss, Joel (2014). Transitioning to a New Scottish State (PDF). UK: Democratic Audit UK, London School of Economics. Archived from the original (PDF) on 8 July 2014.
- Dunleavy, Patrick; Park, Alice; Taylor, Ros (2018). The UK's Changing Democracy: The 2018 Democratic Audit. London, UK: LSE Press. doi:10.31389/book1. ISBN 978-1-909890-44-2.

Chapters in books

- Dunleavy, Patrick (1994), "British politics in the doldrums", in Margetts, Helen; Smyth, Gareth (eds.), Turning Japanese?: Britain with a permanent party of government, London: Lawrence & Wishart, ISBN 9780853157854.

Journal articles

- Dunleavy, Patrick; Margetts, Helen; King, Desmond; Dowding, Keith; Rydin, Yvonne (March 1999). "Regime politics in London local government". Urban Affairs Review. 34 (4): 515–545. doi:10.1177/10780879922184068. S2CID 154446712.
- Dunleavy, Patrick; Margetts, Helen (April 1999). "Mixed electoral systems in Britain and the Jenkins Commission on electoral reform". British Journal of Politics and International Relations. 1 (1): 12–38. doi:10.1111/1467-856X.00002. S2CID 154860419.
- Dunleavy, Patrick; Margetts, Helen (July 2001). "From majoritarian to pluralist democracy?: Electoral reform in Britain since 1997". Journal of Theoretical Politics. 13 (3): 295–319. doi:10.1177/095169280101300304. S2CID 153985975.
- Dunleavy, Patrick; Margetts, Helen (October 2005). "The impact of UK electoral systems". Parliamentary Affairs. 58 (4): 854–870. doi:10.1093/pa/gsi068.
- Dunleavy, Patrick; Margetts, Helen; Bastow, Simon; Tinkler, Jane (July 2006). "New public management is dead – long live digital-era governance". Journal of Public Administration Research and Theory. 16 (3): 467–494. doi:10.1093/jopart/mui057.
- Dunleavy, Patrick; Margetts, Helen; Bastow, Simon; Tinkler, Jane (2008). "Australian e-Government in comparative perspective". Australian Journal of Political Science. 43 (1): 13–26. doi:10.1080/10361140701842540. S2CID 155065922.
