= Jason Blakely =

American political philosopher (born 1980)

- Born: October 9, 1980 (age 46); Fort Collins, Colorado, U.S.

Academic background
- Education: Vassar College; University of California, Berkeley
- Thesis: Three Political Philosophers Debate Social Science (2013)
- Doctoral advisor: Mark Bevir
- Influences: Hans-Georg Gadamer; Charles Taylor; Alasdair MacIntyre

Academic work
- Discipline: Philosophy
- Sub-discipline: Political philosophy
- Institutions: Pepperdine University

Jason Blakely (born 1980) is an American political philosopher. He is professor of Political Science at Pepperdine University and was educated at University of California, Berkeley and Vassar College. At Berkeley, he studied with Mark Bevir and John Searle. He is also noted for his popular writings and work on public philosophy. He is a Catholic, having converted from atheism.

== Critique of social science ==
Blakely's work is part of the wider hermeneutic and phenomenological traditions of philosophy. Specifically, he has extended on arguments by Hans-Georg Gadamer and Charles Taylor, that claim the human sciences should not be modeled on the paradigm of the natural sciences, but treated as interpretive and narrative disciplines closer to the humanistic study of literature, art, philosophy, and history.

Interpretive Social Science (2018) written with Mark Bevir, offered a systematic defense of interpretivism as the philosophical framework appropriate to guiding research across the human sciences, including in the fields of political science, sociology, economics, and psychology. Blakely then turned in We Built Reality (2020) to arguing that mainstream social science was often pseudoscientific and included repressed world-making or double-hermeneutic features (what Blakely dubs "Double-H effects") that help create and reinforce various political and social realities.

== Interpretive theory of ideology ==
In Lost in Ideology (2024), Blakely applied hermeneutics to the study of ideology. He drew on the interpretive anthropology of Clifford Geertz which defines ideology as cultural maps. Blakely innovated on Geertz's conception by adding to it both the world-making features developed in We Built Reality as well as making the theory critical and not merely descriptive, by assessing ideologies as objectively false whenever they attempted to deny their cultural features and present themselves as scientific, commonsensical, or otherwise natural. Against the Marxist tradition, Blakely sees ideologies as not reducible to false beliefs or consciousness but as a form of what Charles Taylor calls "strong evaluation" and Blakely refers to as "ethically magnetic" features.

== Public debates ==
Blakely also maintains a significant public presence centered on debating major ideological trends in US politics. He was an early participant in the "fascism debate", arguing in August 2016 in The Atlantic that Donald Trump's political movement hybridized neoliberal and authoritarian forms of politics. Blakely has been a vocal critic of neoliberal "marketization" of the public school system as justified by neoclassical economic principles. He has also been involved in debates with the New Right and integralists, writing long-form criticisms of Adrian Vermeule and Patrick Deneen.

In 2023, Blakely argued in the cover story of Harper's Magazine, "Doctor's Orders: COVID-19 and the new science wars," that the politics of the pandemic had created a vicious cycle between technocratic overreach by progressives governing in the name of "science" and anti-scientific sentiment by conservatives.

== Books ==
- Lost in Ideology: Interpreting Modern Political Life (Columbia University Press, 2024)
- We Built Reality (Oxford, 2020)
- with Mark Bevir, Interpretive Social Science (Oxford, 2018)
- Alasdair MacIntyre, Charles Taylor and the Demise of Naturalism (Notre Dame, 2016)
