= Comparative European Politics =

Academic journal

- Discipline: Political science
- Language: English
- Edited by: Colin Hay; Ben Rosamond; Martin A. Schain

Publication details
- History: 2003–present
- Publisher: Palgrave Macmillan (United Kingdom)
- Frequency: Quarterly
- Impact factor: 1.261 (2015)

Standard abbreviations
- ISO 4: Comp. Eur. Politics

Indexing
- ISSN: 1472-4790 (print); 1740-388X (web)
- LCCN: 2003263923
- OCLC no.: 52368423

Links
- Journal homepage; Online archive

Comparative European Politics is a quarterly peer-reviewed academic journal focusing on comparative politics and the political economy of the whole of contemporary Europe within and beyond the European Union.

The journal is published by Palgrave Macmillan and the current joint editors-in-chief are Colin Hay (Sciences Po), Ben Rosamond, (University of Copenhagen) and Martin A. Schain, (New York University).

== Abstracting and indexing ==
The journal is abstracted and indexed in:

- ABI/INFORM
- European Sources Online
- Ex Libris / Primo Central
- International Bibliography of Book Reviews (IBR)
- International Bibliography of Periodical Literature (IBZ)
- International Bibliography of the Social Sciences (IBSS)
- International Political Science Abstracts
- SCOPUS
- Sociological Abstracts
- Worldwide Political Science Abstracts

According to the Journal Citation Reports, the journal has a 2015 impact factor of 1.261, ranking it 47th out of 163 journals in the category "Political Science".

== See also ==
- List of political science journals
