= Peter Kerr (political scientist) =

Peter Kerr (born 26 April 1967, in Scotland) is a Scottish political scientist. He is a senior lecturer at the University of Birmingham and a specialist in British politics, political sociology, state theory and theories of social and political change. He specialises and teaches in the area of British politics, with a particular focus on governmental strategies, UK political parties, political leadership and ideology in the UK and, changes and continuities in British political institutions and public policy since 1945.

Kerr studied Politics and Sociology at the University of Strathclyde and then for his PhD on the Thatcher governments at Birmingham.

Kerr authored Postwar British Politics: From Conflict to Consensus in 2001. In the book, Kerr challenges conventional views of British politics. He was the protégé of the British political scientists Colin Hay and David Marsh.

Kerr is a co-editor of the journal British Politics published by Palgrave Macmillan.

== Personal life ==
Kerr has performed stand-up comedy. Kerr once appeared on Secrets of the sexes, a one-off BBC television programme about sex and dating.

He has described himself as "one of the many people in Britain who are not a member of any political party!"
