= Gwendolyn Sasse =

German political scientist (born 1972)

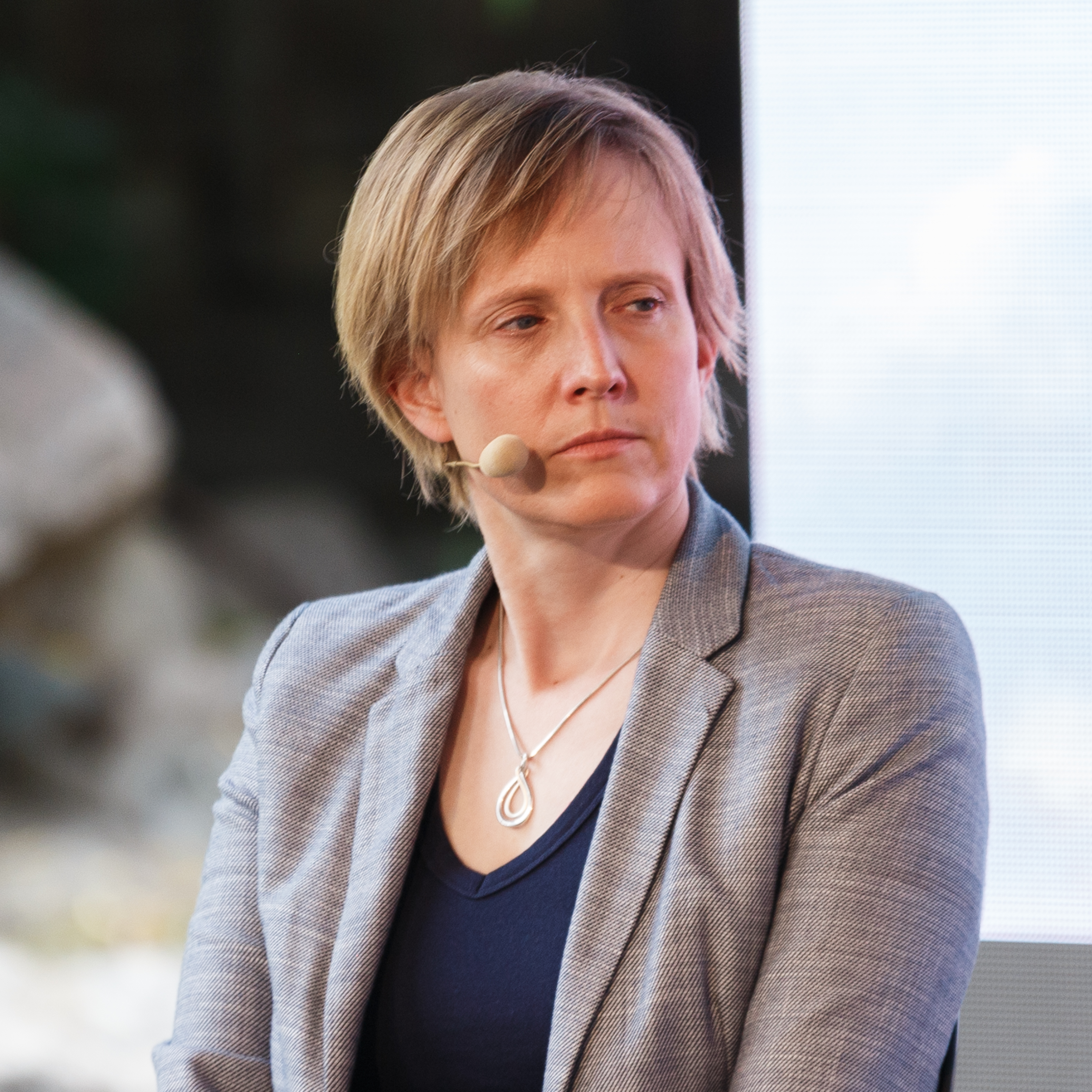
- in 2022 at re:publica Berlin
- Born: February 21, 1972 (age 54); Glinde, Schleswig-Holstein, Germany
- Awards: Alexander Nove Prize of the British Association for Slavonic & East European Studies

Academic background
- Education: University of Hamburg, London School of Economics

Academic work
- Institutions: Nuffield College, University of Oxford
- Main interests: Comparative politics
- Notable works: The Crimea Question: Identity, Transition, and Conflict (2007)

Gwendolyn Sasse (born 21 February 1972 in Glinde, Schleswig-Holstein, Germany) is a German political scientist and Einstein Professor for Comparative Research on Democracy and Authoritarianism at Humboldt-Universität of Berlin. She is also the director of the Centre for East European and International Studies (ZOiS) in Berlin.

Previously, Sasse was professor of comparative politics at Nuffield College, University of Oxford. Sasse has research interests in post-communist transitions; comparative democratisation; ethnic conflicts; international conditionality; national minorities; the political behaviour of migrants; diaspora politics; and the political in contemporary art.

== Awards ==
Sasse won the Alexander Nove Prize of the British Association for Slavonic & East European Studies for her book The Crimea Question: Identity, Transition, and Conflict (2007).

== Selected publications ==
- Sasse, Gwendolyn; Hughes, James, eds. (2002). Ethnicity and Territory in the Former Soviet Union: Regions in Conflict. Cass series in regional and federal studies. London, Portland, Oregon: Frank Cass. ISBN 9780714682105.
- with Hughes, James; Gordon, Claire E. (2004). Europeanization and Regionalization in the EU's Enlargement to Central and Eastern Europe: The Myth of Conditionality. Series: One Europe or several?. Houndmills, Basingstoke, Hampshire New York: Palgrave Macmillan. ISBN 9781403939876.
- — (2007). The Crimea Question: Identity, Transition, and Conflict. Harvard series in Ukrainian studies. Cambridge, Massachusetts: Distributed by Harvard University Press for the Harvard Ukrainian Research Institute. ISBN 9781932650129.
- — (2022). Der Krieg gegen die Ukraine. Hintergründe, Ereignisse, Folgen. C. H. Beck Wissen (in German) (2nd ed.). Munich: C. H. Beck. ISBN 978-3-406-79305-9.
