= Centre for East European and International Studies =

Research institute in Berlin, Germany

The Centre for East European and International Studies (German: Zentrum für Osteuropa- und internationale Studien, ZOiS) is an independent, interdisciplinary research institute based in Berlin, Germany. It was established in 2016. The centre analyses political and sociological developments in Eastern Europe and makes social science research accessible to policymakers, the media, and the public. In 2023, the Prosecutor General's Office of the Russian Federation declared the organisation to be an 'undesirable organisation' under the 2015 undesirable organisations law, which allows Russian authorities to ban any foreign organisation as “undesirable”, making cooperation with them a criminal offence.

Gwendolyn Sasse is the director of the centre, she is also a nonresident senior fellow at Carnegie Europe. The centre is considered an important non-university research institute focusing on Ukraine.
