= Stuart Weir =

British journalist and writer (1938–2024)

Stuart Weir (13 October 1938 – 2 July 2024) was a British journalist, writer, and Visiting Professor with the Government Department at the University of Essex. He was previously the Director of the Democratic Audit, formerly a research unit of the University of Essex. Weir was a founder of the constitutional reform pressure group Charter 88, and was editor of the weekly political magazine the New Statesman from 1987 to 1991, having previously been deputy editor of New Society, which merged with the New Statesman in 1988. Weir was editor of the Labour Party's monthly magazine New Socialist in the mid-1980s. He was involved with the Child Poverty Action Group.

Weir died on 2 July 2024, at the age of 85.

== Publications ==
- Weir, Stuart (January 1999). Politico's Guide to Electoral Reform in Britain (Paperback ed.). London: Politico's Publishing Ltd. ISBN 1-902301-20-X.
- Weir, Stuart.; David Beetham (1999). Political power and democratic control in Britain: the Democratic Audit of the United Kingdom (Paperback ed.). London: Routledge. ISBN 0-415-09644-8.
- Weir, Stuart; Dunleavy, Patrick; Margetts, Helen; Trevor, Smith (2005). Voices of the people: popular attitudes to democratic renewal in Britain (Paperback ed.). London: Politico's. ISBN 9781842751343.
- Burall, Simon; Brendan Donnelly; Stuart Weir (January 2006). Not in Our Name: Democracy and Foreign Policy in the UK (Paperback ed.). London: Politico's. ISBN 1-84275-150-6.
- Weir, Stuart (June 2006). Unequal Britain: The Rights of Man Under President Blair (Paperback ed.). London: Politico's. ISBN 1-84275-091-7.
- Skelcher, Weir; Stuart Weir; Lynne Wilson (December 2000). The Advance of the Quango State: A Report for the LGIU (Paperback ed.). London: Local Government Information Unit. ISBN 1-897957-37-8.

Media offices
Preceded by John Lloyd	Editor of the New Statesman; 1987–1991	Succeeded by Steve Platt
