= Politics (academic journal) =

- Discipline: Political science
- Language: English
- Edited by: Nivi Manchanda; Javier Sajuria; James Strong

Publication details
- History: 1981–present
- Publisher: SAGE on behalf of the Political Studies Association (United Kingdom)
- Frequency: Quarterly
- Impact factor: 1.656 (2018)

Standard abbreviations
- ISO 4: Politics

Indexing
- ISSN: 0263-3957 (print); 1467-9256 (web)
- LCCN: sn85010661
- OCLC no.: 605003437

Links
- Journal homepage; Online access; Online archive (via Sage); Online archive (via Wiley); Online archive (via Ingentaconnect)

Politics is the flagship academic journal of the Political Studies Association established in 1981. Effective August 1, 2024, its incoming editors are Sergiu Gherghina, Kelly Kollman, Niccole Pamphilis, and Bernhard Reinsberg, all of the University of Glasgow.

According to the Journal Citation Reports, the journal has a 2018 impact factor of 1.656, ranking it 56th out of 169 journals in the category "Political Science".

== See also ==
- List of political science journals
