= Torun Dewan =

British political scientist

Torun Dewan is professor of political science at the London School of Economics. Dewan is a specialist in political parties and coalitions, ministerial turnover and legislative and executive behaviour.

== Biography ==
In 1996 he received his bachelor's degree in economics. Dewan earned his M.Sc. at the London School of Economics in 1997 and his D.Phil. at Nuffield College, University of Oxford in 2002. He worked at New York University as a visiting professor in 2012 and Harvard University as a Visiting Lecturer on Government from 2004 till 2005 .

He is the co-editor of the Journal of Theoretical Politics and on the editorial board of the Journal of the European Political Science Association.

Dewan uses game theory and political economy to study the internal organisation of political parties and governments. His work addresses political leadership and communication, the design of cabinets and the incentives facing ministers, party factions and cohesion, and the dynamics of ministerial resignation and government performance; he has also studied the historical development of party-oriented voting in nineteenth-century Britain. His research has appeared in journals including the American Political Science Review, the American Journal of Political Science, the Journal of Politics, and the British Journal of Political Science.

== Selected publications ==
- "The declining talent pool of government." American Journal of Political Science, 54 (2), 2010, pp. 267–286. (With David P. Myatt)
- "Political economy models of elections", Annual Review of Political Science, 14, 2011, pp. 311–330. (With Kenneth A. Shepsle)
- "Strategic opposition and government cohesion in Westminster democracies." American Political Science Review, 105 (102), 2011, pp. 337–358. (With Arthur Spirling)
- Accounting for Ministers: Scandal and Survival in British Government 1945-2007. Cambridge University Press, Cambridge, 2012. (with Samuel Berlinski and Keith Dowding)
- " In Defence of Factions" with Francesco Squintani, 2016 (American Journal of Political Science)
- " Information Aggregation and Optimal Structure of the Executive " with Andrea Galeotti, Christian Ghiglino and Francesco Squintani, 2015 (American Journal of Political Science)
- " Franchise Extension and the British Aristocracy " with Samuel Berlinski and Brenda Van Coppenolle, 2014 (Legislative Studies Quarterly)
- "Elements of Political Persuasion: Content, Contact, or Cue" with Macartan Humphreys and Daniel Rubenson, 2014 (Economic Journal)
- "Dynamic Government Performance: Honeymoons and Crisis of Confidence " with David P. Myatt, 2012 (American Political Science Review)
- "The Rhetorical Strategies of Leaders: Speaking Clearly, Standing Back, and Stepping Down" with David P. Myatt, 2012. Journal of Theoretical Politics) This paper was the winner of the American Political Science Association prize for the best conference paper in political economy.
- "The Three A's of Government Formation: Appointment, Allocation, and Assignment " with Rafael Hortala-Vallve, 2011(American Journal of Political Science)
- " The Political Consequences of Franchise Extension: Evidence from the Second Reform Act" with Samuel Berlinski, 2011 (Quarterly Journal of Political Science)
- "Political Economy Models of Elections" with Kenneth A. Shepsle, 2011 (Annual Review of Political Science)

== Books ==
- Accounting for Ministers: Scandal and Survival in British Government 1945-2007 " with Samuel Berlinski and Keith Dowding, 2012(Cambridge University Press) This books analyzes the careers of British ministers in the period from 1945 till 2007.
- "Rational Choice Politics", 2009, co-edited with Keith Dowding and Kenneth A. Shepsle
