= British Politics (journal) =

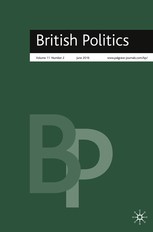
- Discipline: Political science, political sociology
- Language: English
- Edited by: Peter Kerr, Steven Kettell, Christopher Byrne, Sam Warner.

Publication details
- History: 2006–present
- Publisher: Palgrave Macmillan (United Kingdom)
- Frequency: Quarterly
- Impact factor: 2.540 (2020)

Standard abbreviations
- ISO 4: Br. Politics

Indexing
- ISSN: 1746-918X (print); 1746-9198 (web)
- LCCN: 2008205571
- OCLC no.: 326799571

Links
- Journal homepage; Online archive

British Politics is a quarterly peer-reviewed academic journal covering British political studies published by Palgrave Macmillan. The Senior Editors are Peter Kerr (University of Birmingham) and Steven Kettell (University of Warwick), and the editors are Christopher Byrne (University of Nottingham) and Sam Warner (University of Bristol).

== Abstracting and indexing ==
The journal is abstracted and indexed in:

- International Political Science Abstracts
- Sociological Abstracts
- Worldwide Political Science Abstracts
- Social Sciences Citation Index.

According to the Journal Citation Reports, the journal has a 2020 impact factor of 2.540.
