= International Political Science Review =

Academic journal

- Discipline: Political science
- Language: English, French, Spanish
- Edited by: Theresa Reidy, Daniel Stockemer

Publication details
- History: 1980–present
- Publisher: SAGE Publications on behalf of the International Political Science Association
- Frequency: 5/year
- Open access: Hybrid
- Impact factor: 2.2 (2022)

Standard abbreviations
- ISO 4: Int. Political Sci. Rev.

Indexing
- ISSN: 0192-5121 (print); 1460-373X (web)
- LCCN: 80644366
- OCLC no.: 44689900

Links
- Journal homepage; Online access; Online archive

The International Political Science Review is a peer-reviewed academic journal covering the field of political science. The editors-in-chief are Theresa Reidy (University College Cork) and Daniel Stockemer (University of Ottawa). It was established in 1980 and is published by SAGE Publications on behalf of the International Political Science Association.

== Editors' choice and thematic special issues ==
Editors' choice collections of articles on a particular theme, selected from past issues, were initiated in 2011. So far there have been collections on ideology, regimes and regime change, political parties and party systems, gender and political behaviour, gender and political institutions, religion and politics, the politics of inequality, and borders and margins. Access to the articles in these collections is free.

The journal also regularly publishes thematic special issues. Recent examples include special issues on Gender and political financing, BRICS in a Post-Western World, Brexit political implications, COVID 19 political ramifications, Politics of Climate Change, and Populism in World Politics.

== Meisel-Laponce Award ==
The journal has a cash prize of $1000 for the best article published in the previous four years. The prize was first awarded in 2012 and went to Jorgen Moller and Svend-Erik Skaaning, for "Beyond the radial delusion: Conceptualising and measuring democracy and non-democracy". There is free access to the winning and short-listed articles. In 2023 the prize was awarded to Niels Spierings for "Democratic Disillusionment? Desire for Democracy after the Arab Uprisings".

The next award will be made at the International Political Science Association's World Congress in Seoul in 2025.

== Most cited article ==
The most cited paper published in the journal since the beginning of 2002, cited over 900 times according to Google Scholar, is:

- Stolle, D.; Hooghe, M.; Micheletti, M. (2005). "Politics in the Supermarket: Political Consumerism as a Form of Political Participation". International Political Science Review. 26 (3): 245–269. doi:10.1177/0192512105053784. S2CID 44213554.

== Abstracting and indexing ==
The journal is abstracted and indexed in Scopus and the Social Sciences Citation Index. According to the Journal Citation Reports, the journal has a 2022 impact factor of 2.2.

== See also ==
- List of political science journals
