= Political Studies Review =

- Discipline: Political science
- Language: English
- Edited by: James Dennis, David Norman, Nora Siklodi, Dafydd Townley

Publication details
- History: 2003–present
- Publisher: SAGE Publishing on behalf of the Political Studies Association
- Frequency: Quarterly
- Impact factor: 1.4 (2023)

Standard abbreviations
- ISO 4: Political Stud. Rev.

Indexing
- ISSN: 1478-9299 (print); 1478-9302 (web)
- LCCN: 2003242062
- OCLC no.: 51757234

Links
- Journal homepage

The Political Studies Review is a peer-reviewed academic journal that publishes a range of long- and short-form articles, including: original research articles, review articles, early results, the null hypothesis, and symposia and new ideas in the field of political science and international relations. The journal also publishes book reviews.

According to the Journal Citation Reports, the journal has a 2023 impact factor of 1.4.

== See also ==
- List of political science journals
