= Parliamentary Affairs =

- Discipline: Political science
- Language: English

Publication details
- History: 1947 to present
- Publisher: Oxford University Press for the Hansard Society (United Kingdom)
- Frequency: Quarterly
- Open access: Hybrid
- Impact factor: 1.115 (2014)

Standard abbreviations
- ISO 4: Parliam. Aff.

Indexing
- ISSN: 0031-2290
- LCCN: 50013039
- OCLC no.: 1761923

Links
- Journal homepage; Online access; Online archive

Parliamentary Affairs is a British peer-reviewed quarterly academic journal. Founded in 1947, it focuses on the government and politics of the United Kingdom, and also covers parliamentary systems across the world. It is published by the Oxford Journals section of Oxford University Press, in partnership with the Hansard Society, which was created to promote parliamentary democracy throughout the world. The journal is available online, and also produces podcasts. According to the Journal Citation Reports, the journal has an impact factor of 1.798 in 2018, ranking it 60th out of 176 journals in the category "Political Science". It is edited by Philip Cowley, Jon Tonge and David S. Moon.
