= Mark Bevir =

British philosopher of history (born 1963)

- Born: 18 February 1963 (age 63); London, England

Education
- Education: University of Exeter; University of Oxford

Philosophical work
- Era: 20th-/21st-century philosophy
- Region: Western philosophy
- School: Postanalytic, historicism, interpretivism
- Main interests: Philosophy of history, social philosophy, history of ideas, theory of governance
- Notable ideas: Weak intentionalism, narrative explanation, decentred theory of governance, using traditions and dilemmas to understand beliefs

Mark Bevir (born 18 February 1963) is a British philosopher of history. He is a professor of political science and the Director of the Center for British Studies at the University of California, Berkeley, where he currently teaches courses on political theory and philosophy, public policy and organisation, and methodology. He is also a Professor in the Graduate School of Governance, United Nations University (MERIT) and a Distinguished Research Professor in the College of Arts and Humanities, Swansea University.

== Life ==
Bevir was born in London. His family was broadly humanist and impressed upon Bevir the importance of reading, self-expression and seeking personal growth. Bevir was educated at the University of Exeter and Oxford University. He lectured at the University of Madras and at Newcastle University before he moved to Berkeley. He has been a visiting fellow at universities in Australia, Finland, France, the UK, and the US.

== Work ==
Bevir has published extensively in philosophy, history, and political science literatures. His interests are diverse, including Anglophone, continental, and South Asian thought, particularly radical, socialist, and critical theory of the nineteenth and twentieth centuries. Philosophical concerns include postanalytic approaches to subjectivity, social inquiry, ethics, and democratic theory.

=== Philosophy of history ===
Bevir is the author of The Logic of the History of Ideas (1999), which builds on the work of analytic philosophers such as Ludwig Wittgenstein and Donald Davidson to "undertake a normative study of the forms of reasoning appropriate to the history of ideas". His approach is intended to complement, and not directly oppose, the Cambridge School of history of political thought which focuses on recovering meanings of historical texts, and hermeneutic theorists concerned with the phenomenology of understanding. Rather, Bevir introduces the idea of a normative approach that hinges on using traditions and dilemmas to understand beliefs and more complex webs of meaning, key concepts that underpin his work on interpretive political science and governance theory.

=== Interpretivism ===
Mark Bevir is the author of several works defending the interpretive turn in the human sciences. Most recently he offered a systematic defense of interpretivism with Jason Blakely in Interpretive Social Science: An Anti-Naturalist Defense (2018). He and R. A. W. Rhodes are also the authors of Interpreting British Governance (2003), Governance Stories (2006), and The State as Cultural Practice (2010). Bevir holds that political science must necessarily be an interpretive art. This is because he maintains that the starting point of enquiry must be to unpack the meanings, beliefs, and preferences of actors to then make sense of understanding actions, practices, and institutions. Political science is therefore an interpretative discipline underpinned by hermeneutic philosophy rather than positivism: there is no ‘science’ of politics, instead all explanations, including those that deploy statistics and models, are best conceived as narratives.

Bevir has thus provided an elaborate philosophical foundation for a decentred theory of governance woven together by the notions of beliefs, traditions and dilemmas. 'It follows that the role of political scientists is to use (1) ethnography to uncover people's beliefs and preferences, and (2) history to uncover traditions as they develop in response to dilemmas. The product is a story of other people's constructions of what they are doing, which provides actors’ views on changes in government, the economy, and society. So, for example, a political scientist may select a part of the governance process, and then explain it by unpicking various political traditions and how actors within these traditions encounter and act to resolve dilemmas. Governance is thus understood as the contingent and unintended outcome of competing narratives of governance.'

=== Governance ===
Bevir first published his decentred theory of governance in a 2003 paper. Later he published a book length version that applied the theory to both different organizational types and the changing nature of public action. In his collaborations with Rhodes, Bevir applied the theory mainly to Britain.

The theory draws on Bevir's earlier work on the philosophy of history to develop a particular account of the state and of political action. It suggests that the modern state is dispersed, lacking an essence or center. It suggests that political action embodies the meanings and beliefs that people reach as they draw on inherited traditions to respond to new dilemmas.

In her short account, Claire Donovan explains that "For Bevir and Rhodes, decentered theory revolves around the idea of situated agency: institutions, practices or socialisation cannot determine how people behave, so any course of action is a contingent individual choice. People’s actions are explained by their beliefs (or meanings or desires); any one belief is interpreted in the context of the wider web of a person’s beliefs; and these beliefs are explained by traditions and modified by dilemmas. A tradition (or episteme or paradigm) is the set of theories against the background of which a person comes to hold beliefs and perform actions. It is a first influence upon people – a set of beliefs that they inherit and then transform in response to encounters with "dilemmas" (or problems or anomalies). A dilemma arises whenever novel circumstances generate a new belief that forces people to question their previously held beliefs. Change occurs through encountering such dilemmas: while individual responses to dilemmas are grounded in traditions, they then modify just those traditions."

Bevir argues that decentred theory supports democratic participation and pluralism. Post-Marxists like Aletta Norval have also adopted decentred theory, arguing it supports democratic learning and agonistic politics.

=== Intellectual history ===
Bevir wrote his Ph.D. thesis at the University of Oxford on the history of British socialism. He published a number of articles on the topic and then The Making of British Socialism (2011). Bevir rejects accounts of socialism that emphasise class consciousness. He argues that British socialism arose as people revised various traditions in response to economic and religious dilemmas. Socialism has diverse strands rooted in distinct traditions including Tory radicalism, romanticism, liberalism, and positivism. Bevir's emphasis on the diversity of socialism is meant to correct the twentieth century association of socialism with the labour movement and with state intervention. He suggests that earlier socialists focused on social justice, radical democratic schemes, and utopian personal and social transformations.

== Selected bibliography ==
=== Books ===
- Bevir, Mark (1999). The logic of the history of ideas. Cambridge, UK New York: Cambridge University Press. ISBN 9780521016841.
- Bevir, Mark; Rhodes, R. A. W. (2003). Interpreting British governance. London New York: Routledge. ISBN 9780415304528.
- Bevir, Mark (2005). New Labour: a critique. London New York: Routledge. ISBN 9780415359245.
- Bevir, Mark; Rhodes, R. A. W. (2006). Governance stories. New York, NY London: Routledge. ISBN 9780415459778.
- Bevir, Mark (2009). Key concepts in governance. Los Angeles, Calif. London: SAGE. ISBN 9781412935708.
- Bevir, Mark; Rhodes, R. A. W. (2010). The state as cultural practice. Oxford: Oxford University Press. ISBN 9780199580750.
- Bevir, Mark (2010). Democratic governance. Princeton, New Jersey: Princeton University Press. ISBN 9780691145396.
- Bevir, Mark (2011). The making of British socialism. Princeton, New Jersey: Princeton University Press. ISBN 9780691150833.
- Bevir, Mark (2012). Governance : a very short introduction. Oxford: Oxford University Press. ISBN 9780199606412.
- Bevir, Mark (2013). A theory of governance. Berkeley: University of California Press. ISBN 9781938169113.
- Bevir, Mark; Blakely, Jason (2018). Interpretive Social Science. Oxford: Oxford University Press. ISBN 978-0198832959.

=== Edited books ===
- Bevir, Mark; Trentmann, Frank (2002). Critiques of capital in modern Britain and America: transatlantic exchanges 1800 to the present day. Houndmills, Basingstoke, Hampshire New York: Palgrave Macmillan. ISBN 9780333980811.
- Bevir, Mark; Trentmann, Frank (2004). Markets in historical contexts: ideas and politics in the modern world. Cambridge, UK New York: Cambridge University Press. ISBN 9780521044516.
- Bevir, Mark; Stimson, Shannon C.; Adcock, Robert (2007). Modern political science Anglo-American exchanges since 1880. Princeton: Princeton University Press. ISBN 9780691128733.
- Bevir, Mark; Hargis, Jill; Rushing, Sara (2011). Histories of postmodernism. New York: Routledge. ISBN 9780415514705.
- Bevir, Mark (2007). Public governance (volumes 1–4). London Thousands Oaks, California: SAGE. ISBN 9781412921459.
- Bevir, Mark; Trentmann, Frank (2007). Governance, consumers and citizens: agency and resistance in contemporary politics. Basingstoke, Hampshire New York: Palgrave Macmillan. ISBN 9780230517288.
- Bevir, Mark (2010). Interpretive political science (volumes 1–4). Los Angeles: SAGE. ISBN 9781847875808.
- Bevir, Mark (2011). The Sage handbook of governance. Los Angeles: SAGE. ISBN 9781446270424.
- Bevir, Mark (2012). Modern pluralism: Anglo-American debates since 1880. Cambridge, UK New York: Cambridge University Press. ISBN 9781107017672.
- Bevir, Mark; Daddow, Oliver; Hall, Ian (2014). Interpreting global security. London New York: Routledge/Taylor & Francis Group. ISBN 9780415825375.

=== Special journal issues ===
- Bevir, Mark; Trentmann, Frank (2001). "Social justice and modern capitalism: historiographical problems, theoretical perspectives". The European Legacy: Toward New Paradigms. 6 (2): 141–158. doi:10.1080/10848770120031341. S2CID 145578795.
- Bevir, Mark; Rhodes, R. A. W.; Weller, Patrick (March 2003). "Traditions of governance: interpreting the changing role of the public sector". Public Administration. 81 (1): 1–17. doi:10.1111/1467-9299.00334. S2CID 59130897.
- Bevir, Mark (2007). "Historical understanding and the human sciences". Journal of the Philosophy of History. 1 (3): 259–270. doi:10.1163/187226307X229353.
- Bevir, Mark (2008). "What is genealogy?". Journal of the Philosophy of History. 2 (3): 263–275. doi:10.1163/187226308x335958. S2CID 62860109.

=== Reference works ===
- Bevir, Mark (2007). Encyclopedia of governance. Thousand Oaks, California: Sage Publications. ISBN 9781412905794.
- Bevir, Mark (2010). Encyclopedia of political theory. Thousand Oaks, California: SAGE. ISBN 9781412958653.

=== Journal articles ===
- Bevir, Mark (January 1993). "Ernest Belfort Bax: Marxist, idealist, and positivist". Journal of the History of Ideas. 54 (1): 119–135. doi:10.2307/2709863. JSTOR 2709863.
- Bevir, Mark (September 1995). "British socialism and American romanticism". The English Historical Review. 110 (CX) (438): 878–901. doi:10.1093/ehr/CX.438.878.
- Bevir, Mark (June 2002). "Sidney Webb: utilitarianism, positivism, and social democracy". The Journal of Modern History. 74 (2): 217–252. doi:10.1086/343407. S2CID 144317055.
- Bevir, Mark (August 2008). Box-Steffensmeier, Janet M; Brady, Henry E; Collier, David (eds.). "Meta-methodology: clearing the underbrush". The Oxford Handbook of Political Methodology. 1: 48–70. doi:10.1093/oxfordhb/9780199286546.003.0003. ISBN 978-0199286546.
