= Journal of Theoretical Politics =

- Discipline: Political Science
- Language: English
- Edited by: Torun Dewan, John W. Patty

Publication details
- History: 1989-present
- Publisher: SAGE Publications
- Frequency: Quarterly
- Impact factor: 0.837 (2014)

Standard abbreviations
- ISO 4: J. Theor. Politics

Indexing
- CODEN: JTPOEF
- ISSN: 0951-6298 (print); 1460-3667 (web)
- LCCN: 91642994
- OCLC no.: 38526092

Links
- Journal homepage; Online access; Online archive

Journal of Theoretical Politics is a quarterly peer-reviewed academic journal that covers the field of political science. It is published by SAGE Publications. It was established in 1989 and the editors-in-chief are Torun Dewan (London School of Economics) and John W. Patty (Emory University).

== Abstracting and Indexing ==
The journal is abstracted and indexed in Academic Search Premier, International Political Science Abstracts, Scopus, and the Social Sciences Citation Index. According to the Journal Citation Reports, the journal has a 2014 impact factor of 0.837, ranking it 70th out of 161 journals in the category "Political Science".
