= W. J. M. Mackenzie =

Scottish professor (1909–1996)

W. J. M. Mackenzie CBE FBA
- Born: William James Millar Mackenzie; 9 April 1909; Dundee
- Died: 22 August 1996 (aged 87)

Academic background
- Education: Balliol College, Oxford; University of Edinburgh

William James Millar Mackenzie CBE FBA (9 April 1909 – 22 August 1996), also known as Bill Mackenzie, was professor of government at the University of Manchester and professor of politics at the University of Glasgow. He was appointed Commander of the Order of the British Empire (CBE) in 1963 and a fellow of the British Academy (FBA) in 1968.

The W. J. M. Mackenzie Book Prize of the Political Studies Association is named after him.

== Life ==
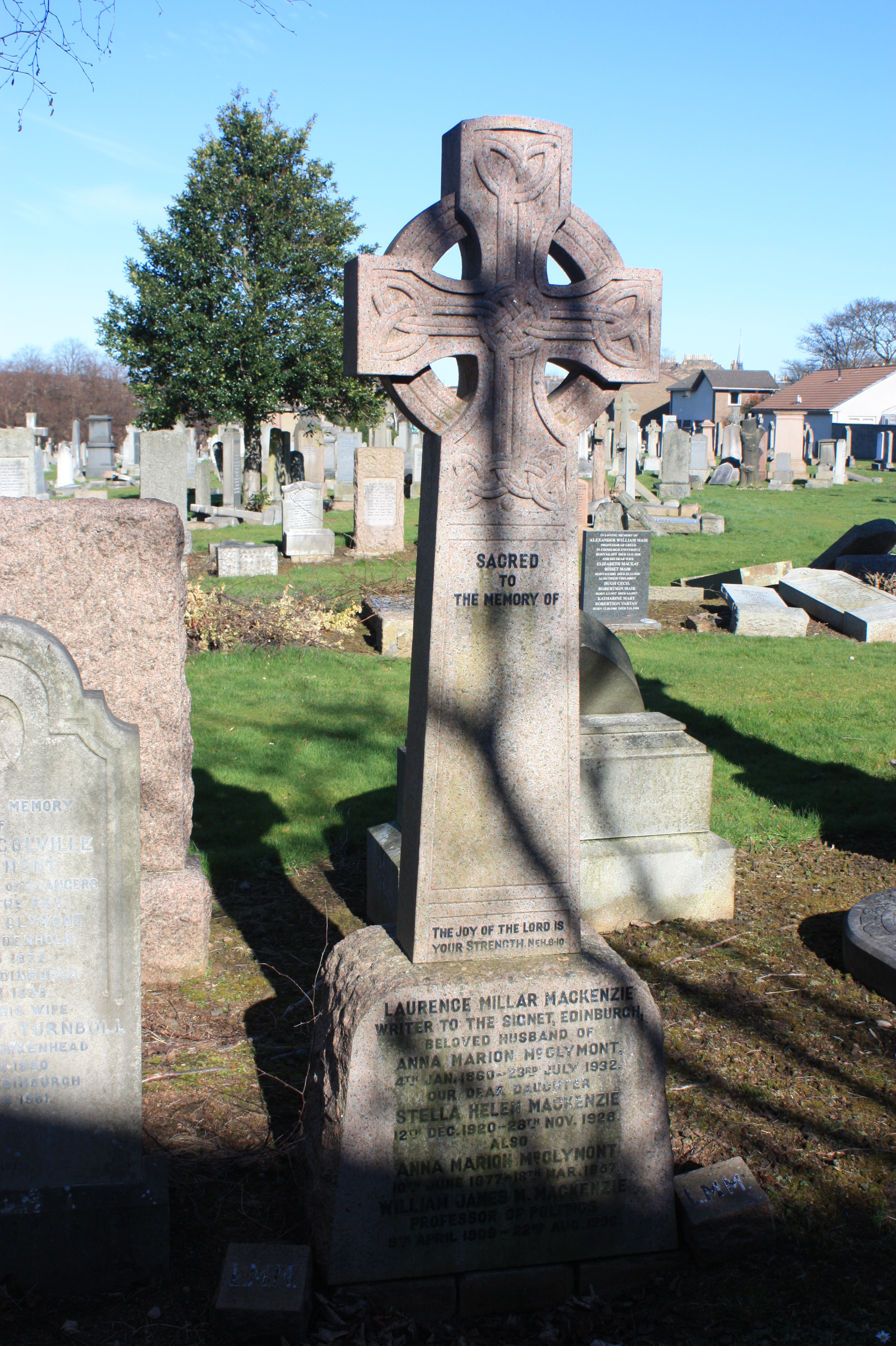
The grave of W J M MacKenzie, Morningside Cemetery, Edinburgh

He was born on 9 April 1909, the son of Laurence Millar Mackenzie WS (1860–1932) and his wife Anna Marion McClymont. They lived at 63 Morningside Park in Edinburgh.

After schooling at Edinburgh Academy, Mackenzie studied classics at Balliol College, Oxford, where he graduated with a double first, and then obtained a Bachelor of Laws degree at the University of Edinburgh. In 1933 he was appointed fellow in classics at Magdalen College, Oxford, before switching fields to teach Philosophy, Politics and Economics. During World War II he worked first at the Air Ministry, and later with the Special Operations Executive.

After the war Mackenzie initially returned to Magdalen College, but in 1948 he was appointed chair of government and administration at the University of Manchester. In 1966 he returned to Scotland as professor of politics at the University of Glasgow.

He died on 22 August 1996 and is buried with his family in Morningside Cemetery, Edinburgh.

== Publications ==
- Federalism and Regionalism (1951)
- Free elections (1958)
- Theories of Local Government (1964)
- Politics and Social Science (1967)
- Explorations in Government: Collected Papers, 1951-68 (1975)
- Power, Violence, Decision (1975)
- Biological Ideas in Politics (1978)
- Political Identity (1978)
