= Keith Dowding =

British political scientist (born 1960)

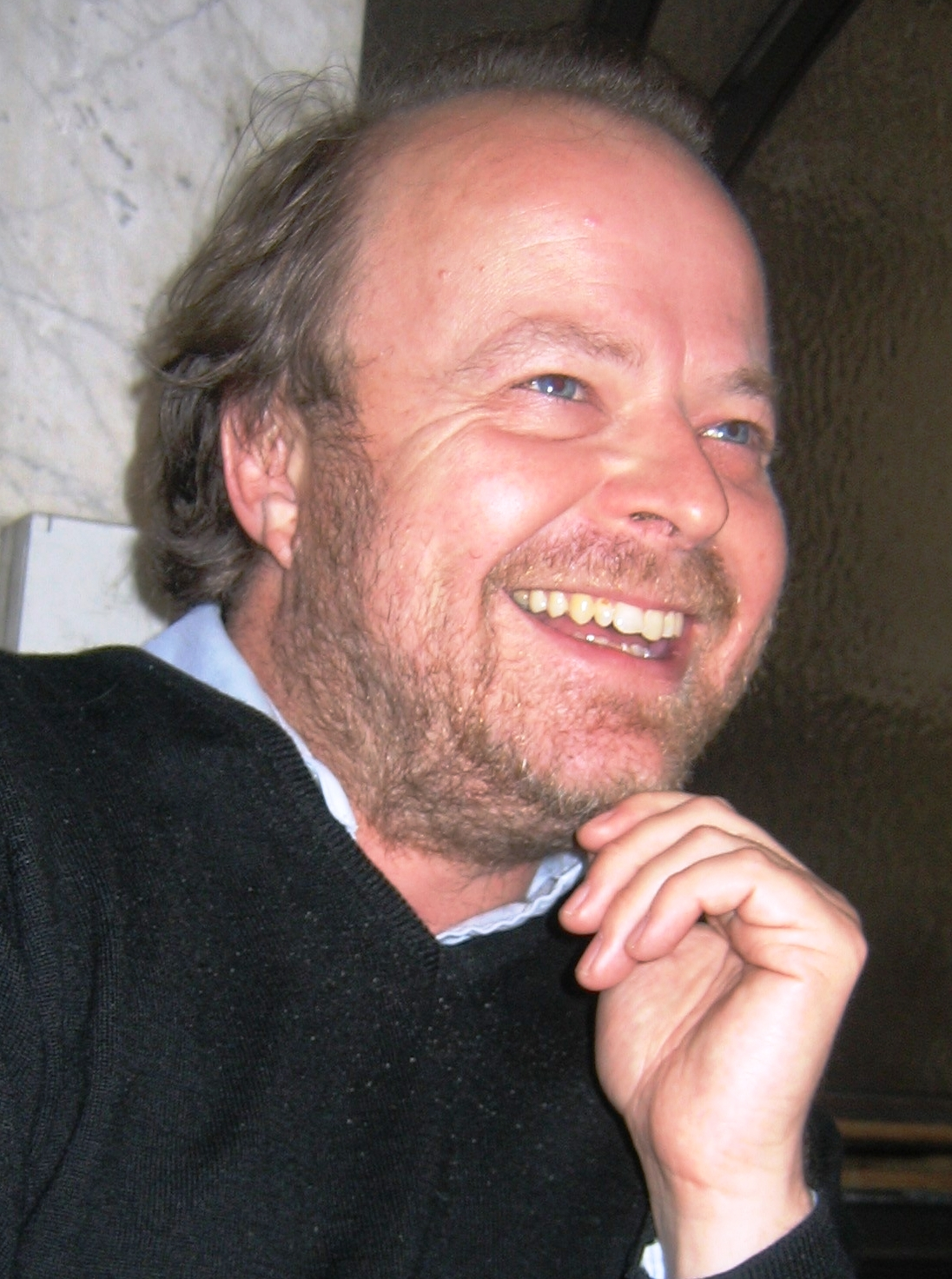
- Dowding in 2007
- Born: Keith Martin Dowding; 6 May 1960 (age 66)

Academic background
- Education: Keele University; Nuffield College, Oxford

Academic work
- Discipline: Political science
- Institutions: Australian National University

Keith Martin Dowding (born 6 May 1960) is a British political scientist. He is Professor of Political Science and Political Philosophy at the Australian National University (ANU). In 2006 he held a position in the Department of Government at the London School of Economics.

His research addresses public administration, public policy, political theory and urban political economy, including work engaging with social choice theory and rational choice approaches.

From 1996 to 2012 he was editor of the Journal of Theoretical Politics, published by SAGE Publishing.

== Early life and education ==
Dowding received a BA in Philosophy and Politics from Keele University in 1982 and completed a DPhil at Nuffield College, Oxford, University of Oxford, in 1987.

== Career ==
Dowding became editor of the Journal of Theoretical Politics in 1996. In 2007 he joined the Australian National University as Professor of Political Science. He was appointed Distinguished Professor in 2018.

== Research ==
Dowding has written on the concept of power in political theory, using formal analytical methods to examine competing accounts of its structure and operation. In work engaging with Brian Barry’s discussion of luck, he argues that structural features of society can result in some groups being “systematically lucky” and others “systematically unlucky”.

With Peter John and Stephen Biggs, he examined residential mobility in London as a test of the behavioural assumptions of the Tiebout model.

He later co-authored work applying Albert Hirschman’s Exit, Voice, and Loyalty framework to survey data on local public services.

The framework was further developed in Exits, Voices and Social Investment (2012).

In "The Prime Ministerialisation of the British Prime Minister", Dowding examines claims that British politics has become presidentialised. He argues that increases in prime ministerial influence reflect the use and consolidation of existing powers rather than the development of a presidential-style executive structure.

He has also co-authored work analysing ministerial resignations in the United Kingdom between 1945 and 2007.
