= Political Studies Association =

- Formation: 1950
- Type: Learned society
- Headquarters: London
- Location: United Kingdom
- Official language: English
- Chair: Rose Gann
- Website: www.psa.ac.uk

The Political Studies Association (PSA) is a learned society in the United Kingdom which exists to develop and promote the study of politics. It is the leading association in its field in the United Kingdom, with an international membership including academics in political science and current affairs, theorists and practitioners, policy makers, researchers and students in higher education.

The PSA was founded in 1950, following the establishment of the International Political Science Association in 1949, and was initially supported by a grant from UNESCO.

The PSA has a network of over fifty "Specialist Groups" that provide a research focus for members and receive support from the PSA.

== Publications ==
The PSA publishes five journals:

- British Journal of Politics and International Relations
- Political Insight
- Political Studies: publishes research in all areas of politics and international relations. The journal's approach is not dominated by a particular methodological or theoretical framework. Indeed, the editors have expressed their wish to encourage a pluralism and debate between approaches.
- Political Studies Review: provides not only reviews of new books and literature on political science and international relations but also provides a forum for wide-ranging debates and reviews.
- Politics.

== Awards ==
The PSA holds an annual awards ceremony, giving prizes to political scientists, journalists and politicians. Academic prizes include the Sir Isaiah Berlin Prize, for lifetime contribution to political studies and the W. J. M. Mackenzie Book Prize for the best book published in political science during the preceding year.

In 2000, to celebrate its 50th anniversary, the PSA also awarded one-off Lifetime Achievement Awards to Brian Barry, Jean Blondel, David Butler, Bernard Crick, Denis Healey, Edward Heath, Stanley Hoffmann, Roy Jenkins, and Richard Rose.

In 2012, Professor Vicky Randall, who served as chair of the association from 2008 until 2011, was granted a Special Recognition Award in honour of “her tireless work integrating gender analysis into political science and her efforts to secure fairer representation of women in political life and the study of politics”.
