= Bibliography of the Federalist Papers =

The Federalist Papers is a series of 85 essays published by Alexander Hamilton, James Madison, and John Jay.

== Collections ==
- The Federalist: A Collection of Essays, Written in Favour of the New Constitution, as Agreed Upon by the Federal Convention, September 17, 1787. Vol. I. J & A McLean. 1788. (Nos. 1–36)
- The Federalist: A Collection of Essays, Written in Favour of the New Constitution, as Agreed Upon by the Federal Convention, September 17, 1787. Vol. II. J & A McLean. 1788. (Nos. 37–85)
- Hopkins, George F., ed. (1802). The Federalist: On the New Constitution. Vol. I. (Nos. 1–46)
- Hopkins, George F., ed. (1802). The Federalist: On the New Constitution. Vol. II. (Nos. 47–85)
- The Works of Alexander Hamilton. Vol. II. Williams & Whiting. 1810. (Nos. 1–46)
- The Works of Alexander Hamilton. Vol. III. Williams & Whiting. 1810. (Nos. 47–85)
- Gideon, Jacob, ed. (1818). The Federalist: On the New Constitution. Washington, J. Gideon, jun.
- The Federalist: On the New Constitution. Hallowell. 1826.
- Dawson, Henry Barton, ed. (1864). The Federalist: A Collection of Essays, Written in Favor of the New Constitution, as agreed upon by the Federal Convention. Morrisania, N.Y.
- Lodge, Henry Cabot, ed. (1888). The Federalist: A Commentary on the Constitution of the United States. G. P. Putnam's Sons.
- Ford, Paul Leicester, ed. (1898). The Federalist: A Commentary on the Constitution of the United States. New York, H. Holt and company.
- Mittell, Sherman F.; Earle, Edward Mead, eds. (1937). The Federalist: A Commentary on the Constitution of the United States. National Home Library Foundation.
- Cooke, Jacob E., ed. (1961). The Federalist. World Publishing Company.
- Rossiter, Clinton, ed. (1961). The Federalist Papers. New American Library.

== General analysis ==
=== Books ===
- Allen, W. B.; Cloonan, Kevin A. (2000). The Federalist Papers: A Commentary: "The Baton Rouge Lectures". Peter Lang. ISBN 978-0-8204-3756-9.
- Brunhöber, Beatrice (2020). Die Erfindung »demokratischer Repräsentation« in den Federalist Papers [The invention of "democratic representation" in the Federalist Papers] (in German). Mohr Siebeck. ISBN 978-3-16-150275-0.
- Carey, George W. (1989). The Federalist: Design for a Constitutional Republic. University of Illinois Press. ISBN 978-0-252-01609-7.
- Dietze, Gottfried (1960). The Federalist: A Classic on Federalism and Free Government. Greenwood Press.
- Epstein, David F. (2007). The Political Theory of The Federalist. University of Chicago Press. ISBN 978-0-226-21301-9.
- Furtwangler, Albert (1984). The Authority of Publius: A Reading of the Federalist Papers. Cornell University Press. ISBN 978-0-8014-1643-9.
- Lhotta, Roland, ed. (2010). Die hybride Republik: Die Federalist Papers und die politische Moderne [The Hybrid Republic: The Federalist Papers and Political Modernity] (in German). Nomos Verlagsgesellschaft. ISBN 978-3-8452-2520-3.
- Kleidosty, Jeremy; Xidias, Jason (2017). An Analysis of Alexander Hamilton, James Madison, and John Jay's The Federalist Papers. Macat Library. ISBN 978-1-912282-15-9.
- Levinson, Sanford (2015). An Argument Open to All: Reading "The Federalist" in the 21st Century. Yale University Press. ISBN 978-0-300-21645-5.
- Meyerson, Michael I. (2008). Liberty's Blueprint: How Madison and Hamilton Wrote the Federalist Papers, Defined the Constitution, and Made the Democracy Safe for the World. Basic Books. ISBN 978-0-465-00264-1.
- Millican, Edward (2014). One United People: The Federalist Papers and the National Idea. University Press of Kentucky. ISBN 978-0-8131-6137-2.
- Potter, Kathleen O. (2002). The Federalist's Vision of Popular Sovereignty in the New American Republic. LFB Scholarly Publishing. ISBN 978-1-931202-44-2.
- Scott, Kyle (2013). The Federalist Papers: A Reader's Guide. A & C Black. ISBN 978-1-4411-0814-2.
- White, Morton (1989). Philosophy, The Federalist, and the Constitution. Oxford University Press. ISBN 978-0-19-536307-4.
- Wills, Garry (1981). Explaining America: The Federalist. Doubleday. ISBN 978-0-385-14689-0.

=== Articles ===
- Abbott, Philip (1996). "What's New in the Federalist Papers?". Political Research Quarterly. 49 (3): 525–545. doi:10.1177/106591299604900304. ISSN 1065-9129.
- Adair, Douglass (1965). "Review: The Federalist Papers". William and Mary Quarterly. 22 (1): 131–139. doi:10.2307/1920773. ISSN 0043-5597. JSTOR 1920773.
- Allen, William B. (1990). "The Constitutionalism of The Federalist Papers". The Political Science Reviewer. 19.
- Baker, John S. Jr (1990). "The Federalist and the Bill of Rights". Texas Tech Law Review. 21: 2425–2442.
- Carey, George W. (1990). "The Federalist and the Machinery of Government". Texas Tech Law Review. 21: 2407–2424.
- Diamond, Martin (1959). "Democracy and The Federalist: A Reconsideration of the Framers' Intent". American Political Science Review. 53 (1): 52–68. doi:10.2307/1951730. ISSN 1537-5943. JSTOR 1951730.
- Diamond, Martin (1977). "The Federalist on Federalism: 'Neither a National nor a Federal Constitution, but a Composition of Both'". The Yale Law Journal. 86 (6): 1273–1285. doi:10.2307/795706. ISSN 0044-0094. JSTOR 795706.
- Epstein, Richard A. (1993). "The Federalist Papers: From Practical Politics to High Principle". Harvard Journal of Law and Public Policy. 16 (1): 13–21.
- Erler, Edward J. (1981). "The Problem of the Public Good in The Federalist". Polity. 13 (4): 649–667. doi:10.2307/3234644. ISSN 0032-3497. JSTOR 3234644.
- Estes, Todd (2008). "The Voices of Publius and the Strategies of Persuasion in The Federalist". Journal of the Early Republic. 28 (4): 523–558. doi:10.1353/jer.0.0034. ISSN 0275-1275. JSTOR 40208134.
- Felice, Carl M. IV (2021). "Rule by the Few in the Federalist Papers: An Examination of the Aristocratic Preference of Publius". British Journal of American Legal Studies. 10 (2): 217–244. doi:10.2478/bjals-2020-0020.
- Frank, Jason (2007). "'Unauthorized Propositions': The Federalist Papers and Constituent Power". Diacritics. 37 (2/3): 103–120. doi:10.1353/dia.0.0030. ISSN 0300-7162. JSTOR 20204167.
- Graf, Eric-Clifford (2026). "El federalista como rito de convivencia entre dos culturas rivales" [The Federalist Papers as a ritual of coexistence between two rival cultures] (PDF). Araucaria (in Spanish) (62): 449–468. doi:10.12795/araucaria.2026.i62.22.
- Helfman, Tara (2002). "The Law of Nations in The Federalist Papers". The Journal of Legal History. 23 (2): 107–128. doi:10.1080/01440362308539645. ISSN 0144-0365.
- Howe, Daniel W. (1987). "The Political Psychology of The Federalist". The William and Mary Quarterly. 44 (3): 485–509. doi:10.2307/1939767. ISSN 0043-5597. JSTOR 1939767.
- Jasinski, James (1997). "Heteroglossia, Polyphony, and The Federalist Papers". Rhetoric Society Quarterly. 27 (1): 23–46. doi:10.1080/02773949709391086. ISSN 0277-3945. JSTOR 3886212.
- Levinson, Sanford (2023). "Constructing a Modern Canon for the Federalist". Journal of American Constitutional History. 1 (3): 313–341. doi:10.59015/jach.KOSF4800.
- Lynch, Joseph M. (2000). "The Federalists and the Federalist: A Forgotten History". Seton Hall Law Review. 31: 18–29.
- Mattei, Eugenia (2026). "Introducción al Monográfico: El federalista en el pensamiento político y la práctica constitucional" [Introduction to the Monograph: The Federalist in Political Thought and Constitutional Practice] (PDF). Araucaria (in Spanish) (62): 247–252. doi:10.12795/araucaria.2026.i62.13.
- Miller, Joshua (1988). "The Ghostly Body Politic: The Federalist Papers and Popular Sovereignty". Political Theory. 16 (1): 99–119. doi:10.1177/0090591788016001006. ISSN 0090-5917. JSTOR 191649.
- Nourse, Victoria (1996). "Toward A 'Due Foundation' for the Separation of Powers: The Federalist Papers as Political Narrative". Georgetown Law Faculty Publications and Other Works: 447–521.
- Pangle, Thomas L. (1986). "The Federalist Papers' Vision of Civic Health and the Tradition Out of Which That Vision Emerges". Western Political Quarterly. 39 (4): 577–602. doi:10.1177/106591298603900402. ISSN 0043-4078.
- Peterson, Paul (1979). "The Meaning of Republicanism in the Federalist". Publius. 9 (2): 43–75. ISSN 0048-5950. JSTOR 3329734.
- Quint, Peter E. (1988). "The Federalist Papers and the Constitution of the United States". Kentucky Law Journal. 77 (2): 369–402.
- Rodríguez Rial, Gabriela (2026). "El federalista en la teoría política de Alexis de Tocqueville y Judith Shklar" [The Federalist Papers in the Political Theory of Alexis de Tocqueville and Judith Shklar.] (PDF). Araucaria (in Spanish) (62): 257–298. doi:10.12795/araucaria.2026.i62.15.
- Riley, Patrick (1978). "Martin Diamond's View of The Federalist". Publius. 8 (3): 71–101. ISSN 0048-5950. JSTOR 3329710.
- Ross, Gordon D. (1972). "The Federalist and the 'Experience' of Small Republics". Eighteenth-Century Studies. 5 (4): 559–568. doi:10.2307/2737536. ISSN 0013-2586. JSTOR 2737536.
- Scanlan, James P. (1959). "The Federalist and Human Nature". The Review of Politics. 21 (4): 657–677. doi:10.1017/S0034670500003892. ISSN 0034-6705. JSTOR 1405646.
- Slonim, Shlomo (2003). "The Federalist Papers and the Bill of Rights" (PDF). Constitutional Commentary: 151–161.
- Sorenson, Leonard R. (1989). "The Federalist Papers on The Constitutionality of Executive Prerogative". Presidential Studies Quarterly. 19 (2): 267–283. ISSN 0360-4918. JSTOR 40574673.
- Stockton, Constant Noble (1971). "Are There Natural Rights in The Federalist?". Ethics. 82 (1): 72–82. doi:10.1086/291831. ISSN 0014-1704. JSTOR 2380263.
- Taylor, Quentin P. (2002). "Publius and Persuasion: Rhetorical Readings of The Federalist Papers". Political Science Reviewer. 31: 236–282. ProQuest 217745618.
- Tillman, Seth Barrett (2003). "The Federalist Papers as Reliable Historical Source Material For Constitutional Interpretation". West Virginia Law Review. 105 (3): 601–619.
- Toudic, Hugo; Spector, Céline (2024). "Montesquieu and The Federalist: A Contested Legacy at the American Founding". Early American Studies. 22 (1): 80–104. doi:10.1353/eam.2024.a920460. ISSN 1559-0895.
- Vita, Leticia (2026). "Las armas del enemigo: El federalista en los debates de la Convención Nacional Constituyente argentina de 1949" [The Enemy's Weapons: The Federalist Papers in the Debates of the 1949 Argentine Constituent Convention] (PDF). Araucaria (in Spanish) (62): 425–448. doi:10.12795/araucaria.2026.i62.21.
- Weaver, David R. (1997). "Leadership, Locke, and the Federalist". American Journal of Political Science. 41 (2): 420–446. doi:10.2307/2111771. ISSN 0092-5853. JSTOR 2111771.
- Wieczorek, Tomás (2026). "El federalismo rioplatense y argentino del siglo XIX, antes y después de El federalista" [19th-Century Federalism in the River Plate Region and Argentina, before and after The Federalist Papers] (PDF). Araucaria (in Spanish) (62): 399–424. doi:10.12795/araucaria.2026.i62.20.
- Yarbrough, Jean (1979). "Thoughts on the Federalist's View of Representation". Polity. 12 (1): 65–82. doi:10.2307/3234382. ISSN 0032-3497. JSTOR 3234382.
- Yarbrough, Jean (1985). "Rethinking The Federalist's View of Federalism". Publius. 15 (1): 31–53. doi:10.1093/oxfordjournals.pubjof.a037532. ISSN 0048-5950. JSTOR 3329944.

=== Chapters ===
- Banning, Lance; Estes, Todd (2014). "The Federalist Papers". Founding Visions: the Ideas, Individuals, and Intersections that Created America. University Press of Kentucky. pp. 133–144. ISBN 978-0-8131-5285-1.
- Box, Richard C. (2015). "The Federalist Papers, Nos. 10, 17, & 51". Public Administration and Society: Critical Issues in American Governance. Routledge. ISBN 978-1-315-70146-2.
- Hampsher-Monk, Iain (2010). "Democracy and Federation in the Federalist Papers". In Burgess, Michael; Gagnon, Alain (eds.). Federal Democracies. Routledge. ISBN 978-0-203-85757-1.
- Maia, Alessandra (2026). "The Federalist Papers and the delegate vision of representation". In Freire, André; Önnudóttir, Eva H.; Pedrazzani, Andrea; Schmitt, Hermann (eds.). Elgar Encyclopedia of Political Representation. Edward Elgar Publishing. pp. 45–47. ISBN 9781035324828.
- Maia, Alessandra; Silva, Mayra (2026). "The Federalist Papers and the idea of federalism". In Freire, André; Önnudóttir, Eva H.; Pedrazzani, Andrea; Schmitt, Hermann (eds.). Elgar Encyclopedia of Political Representation. Edward Elgar Publishing. pp. 48–50. ISBN 9781035324828.
- Maia, Alessandra; Silva, Mayra (2026). "The Federalist Papers and the idea of limitation of the power of majorities". In Freire, André; Önnudóttir, Eva H.; Pedrazzani, Andrea; Schmitt, Hermann (eds.). Elgar Encyclopedia of Political Representation. Edward Elgar Publishing. pp. 51–54. ISBN 9781035324828.
- Markovitz, Irving Leonard (2012). "Constitutions, The Federalist Papers, and the Transition to Democracy". In Anderson, Lisa (ed.). Transitions to Democracy. Columbia University Press. ISBN 978-0-231-50247-4.
- Quinn, Frederick (2015). "Introduction to The Federalist Papers Reader". In Box, Richard C. (ed.). Public Administration and Society Critical Issues in American Governance. Routledge. ISBN 978-1-315-70146-2.
- Schmidt, Manfred G. (2025). "Federalist Papers: Institutionelle Zügelung der Demokratie" [Federalist Papers: Institutional Restraint on Democracy]. Demokratietheorien [Theories of Democracy] (in German). Springer VS Wiesbaden. pp. 71–83. ISBN 978-3-658-46845-3.
- Taylor, Quentin (2016). "'A System Without a Precedent': The Federalism of the Federalist Papers". In Ward, Ann (ed.). The Ashgate Research Companion to Federalism. Routledge. ISBN 978-1-315-61296-6.
- Zeitlin, Irving M. (2020). "The Federalist Papers". Rulers and Ruled: An Introduction to Classical Political Theory. University of Toronto Press. pp. 178–198. ISBN 978-1-4426-7949-8.

=== Edited volumes ===
- Grofman, Bernard; Wittman, Donald A., eds. (1989). The Federalist Papers and the New Institutionalism. Agathon Press. ISBN 978-0-87586-085-5.
  - Brams, Steven J. "Are the Two Houses of Congress Really Coequal?". In Grofman & Wittman (1989), pp. 125–141.
  - Cain, Bruce E.; Jones, W. T. "Madison's Theory of Representation". In Grofman & Wittman (1989), pp. 11–30.
  - Chamberlin, John R. "Assessing the Power of the Supreme Court". In Grofman & Wittman (1989), pp. 142–149.
  - Chappell, Henry W. Jr. "Electoral Institutions in The Federalist Papers: A Contemporary Perspective". In Grofman & Wittman (1989), pp. 39–52.
  - Eavey, Cheryl L. "Constitutional Conflict in State and Nation". In Grofman & Wittman (1989), pp. 205–219.
  - Fink, Evelyn C.; Riker, William H. "The Strategy of Ratification". In Grofman & Wittman (1989), pp. 220–256.
  - Hardin, Russell. "Why A Constitution?". In Grofman & Wittman (1989), pp. 100–120.
  - McGuire, Robert A.; Ohsfeldt, Robert L. "Public Choice Analysis and the Ratification of the Constitution". In Grofman & Wittman (1989), pp. 175–204.
  - Miller, Gary J.; Hammond, Thomas H. "Stability and Efficiency in a Separation-of-Powers Constitutional System". In Grofman & Wittman (1989), pp. 85–99.
  - Page, Benjamin I.; Shapiro, Robert Y. "Restraining the Whims and Passions of the Public". In Grofman & Wittman (1989), pp. 53–70.
  - Petracca, Mark P. "The Distribution of Power in the Federal Government: Perspecives from The Federalist Papers — A Critique". In Grofman & Wittman (1989), pp. 158–172.
  - Schwartz, Thomas. "Publius and Public Choice". In Grofman & Wittman (1989), pp. 31–38.
  - Schwartz, Thomas. "Checks, Balances, and Bureaucratic Usurpation of Congressional Power". In Grofman & Wittman (1989), pp. 150–157.
  - Wittman, Donald. "The Constitution as an Optimal Social Contract: A Transaction Cost Analysis of The Federalist Papers". In Grofman & Wittman (1989), pp. 73–84.
- Rakove, Jack N.; Sheehan, Colleen A., eds. (2020). The Cambridge Companion to the Federalist Papers. Cambridge Companions to Philosophy. Cambridge University Press. doi:10.1017/9781316479865. ISBN 978-1-107-13639-7.
  - Edling, Max M. "'A Vigorous National Government': Hamilton on Security, War, and Revenue". In Rakove & Sheehan (2020), pp. 82–113.
  - Elster, Jon. "The Political Psychology of Publius: Reason, Passion, and Interest in The Federalist". In Rakove & Sheehan (2020), pp. 194–227.
  - Ferejohn, John; Hills, Roderick. "Publius's Political Science". In Rakove & Sheehan (2020), pp. 515–556.
  - Gibson, Alan. "Madison's Republican Remedy: The Tenth Federalist and the Creation of an Impartial Republic". In Rakove & Sheehan (2020), pp. 263–301.
  - Golove, David M.; Hulsebosch, Daniel J. "'The Known Opinion of the Impartial World': Foreign Relations and the Law of Nations in The Federalist". In Rakove & Sheehan (2020), pp. 114–163.
  - Kramer, Larry D. "'The Interest of the Man': James Madison's Constitutional Politics". In Rakove & Sheehan (2020), pp. 330–369.
  - Mansfield, Harvey C. "The Republican Form of Government in The Federalist". In Rakove & Sheehan (2020), pp. 557–586.
  - Nelson, Eric. "Publius on Monarchy". In Rakove & Sheehan (2020), pp. 426–463.
  - Rahe, Paul A. "Montesquieu, Hume, Adam Smith, and the Philosophical Perspective of The Federalist". In Rakove & Sheehan (2020), pp. 228–262.
  - Rakove, Jack N. "Politics Indoors and Out-of-Doors: A Fault Line in Madison's Thinking". In Rakove & Sheehan (2020), pp. 370–399.
  - Siemers, David J. "Publius and the Anti-Federalists: 'A Satisfactory Answer to all the Objections'?". In Rakove & Sheehan (2020), pp. 18–51.
  - Taylor, Quentin P. "John Jay, The Federalist, and the Constitution". In Rakove & Sheehan (2020), pp. 52–81.
  - Sheehan, Colleen A. "The Republicanism of Publius: The American Way of Life". In Rakove & Sheehan (2020), pp. 302–329.
  - Treanor, William M. "The Genius of Hamilton and the Birth of the Modern Theory of the Judiciary". In Rakove & Sheehan (2020), pp. 464–514.
  - Weiner, Greg. "'The Cool and Deliberate Sense of the Community': The Federalist on Congress". In Rakove & Sheehan (2020), pp. 400–425.
  - Zuckert, Michael. "The Federalist's New Federalism". In Rakove & Sheehan (2020), pp. 164–193.

== By subject ==
=== The Anti-Federalist Papers ===
- Amar, Akhil Reed (1993). "Anti-Federalists, the Federalist Papers, and the Big Argument for Union". Harvard Journal of Law & Public Policy. 16 (1): 111–118.
- Howe, Daniel Walker (1989). "Anti-Federalist/Federalist Dialogue and its Implications for Constitutional Understanding". Northwestern University Law Review. 84 (1).
- Siemers, David J. (2020). "Publius and the Anti-Federalists: 'A Satisfactory Answer to all the Objections'?". In Rakove, Jack N.; Sheehan, Colleen A. (eds.). The Cambridge Companion to the Federalist Papers. Cambridge University Press. pp. 18–51. ISBN 978-1-107-13639-7.

=== Authorship ===
- Adair, Douglass (1944). "The Authorship of the Disputed Federalist Papers". William and Mary Quarterly. 1 (2): 98–122. doi:10.2307/1921883. ISSN 0043-5597. JSTOR 1921883.
- Adair, Douglass (1944). "The Authorship of the Disputed Federalist Papers: Part II". The William and Mary Quarterly. 1 (3): 235–264. doi:10.2307/1923729. ISSN 0043-5597. JSTOR 1923729.
- Bosch, Robert A.; Smith, Jason A. (1998). "Separating Hyperplanes and the Authorship of the Disputed Federalist Papers". The American Mathematical Monthly. 105 (7): 601–608. doi:10.1080/00029890.1998.12004933. ISSN 0002-9890.
- Bourne, Edward Gaylord (1897). "The Authorship of the Federalist". The American Historical Review. 2 (3): 443–460. doi:10.2307/1833399. ISSN 0002-8762. JSTOR 1833399.
- Collins, Jeff; Kaufer, David; Vlachos, Pantelis; Butler, Brian; Ishizaki, Suguru (2004). "Detecting Collaborations in Text Comparing the Authors' Rhetorical Language Choices in The Federalist Papers". Computers and the Humanities. 38 (1): 15–36. doi:10.1023/B:CHUM.0000009291.06947.52. ISSN 0010-4817.
- Fung, Glenn (2003). "The disputed federalist papers: SVM feature selection via concave minimization". Proceedings of the 2003 conference on Diversity in computing. Association for Computing Machinery. pp. 42–46. doi:10.1145/948542.948551. ISBN 1-58113-790-7.
- Holmes, D. I.; Forsyth, R. S. (1995). "The Federalist Revisited: New Directions in Authorship Attribution". Literary and Linguistic Computing. 10 (2): 111–127. doi:10.1093/llc/10.2.111. ISSN 0268-1145.
- Mason, Alpheus Thomas (1952). "The Federalist: A Split Personality". The American Historical Review. 57 (3): 625–643. doi:10.2307/1844351. ISSN 0002-8762. JSTOR 1844351.
- Merriam, Thomas (1989). "An Experiment with the Federalist Papers". Computers and the Humanities. 23 (3): 251–254. doi:10.1007/BF00056147. ISSN 0010-4817. JSTOR 30200167.
- Miranda-García, Antonio; Calle-Martín, Javier (2012). "The Authorship of the Disputed Federalist Papers with an Annotated Corpus". English Studies. 93 (3): 371–390. doi:10.1080/0013838X.2012.668795. ISSN 0013-838X.
- Mosteller, Frederick; Wallace, David L. (1963). "Inference in an Authorship Problem: A Comparative Study of Discrimination Methods Applied to the Authorship of the Disputed Federalist Papers". Journal of the American Statistical Association. 58 (302): 275–309. doi:10.1080/01621459.1963.10500849. ISSN 0162-1459. JSTOR 2283270.
- Mosteller, Frederick; Wallace, David L. (1984). Applied Bayesian and Classical Inference: The Case of The Federalist Papers. Springer New York. ISBN 978-1-4612-5256-6.
- Mosteller, Frederick (1987). "A Statistical Study of the Writing Styles of the Authors of The Federalist Papers". Proceedings of the American Philosophical Society. 131 (2): 132–140. ISSN 0003-049X. JSTOR 986786.
- Rokeach, Milton; Homant, Robert; Penner, Louis (1970). "A Value Analysis of the Disputed Federalist Papers". Journal of Personality and Social Psychology. 16 (2): 245–250. doi:10.1037/h0029857. ISSN 1939-1315.
- Tweedie, F. J.; Singh, S.; Holmes, D. I. (1996). "Neural Network Applications in Stylometry: The Federalist Papers". Computers and the Humanities. 30 (1): 1–10. doi:10.1007/BF00054024. ISSN 1572-8412.

=== Judicial interpretation ===
- Barber, Sotirios A. (1988). "Judicial Review and The Federalist". University of Chicago Law Review. 55 (3): 836–887. doi:10.2307/1599704. ISSN 0041-9494. JSTOR 1599704.
- Coenen, Dan (2006). "A Rhetoric for Ratification: The Argument of The Federalist and Its Impact on Constitutional Interpretation". Duke Law Journal. 56 (2): 469–543. ISSN 0012-7086. JSTOR 40040551.
- Corley, Pamela C.; Howard, Robert M.; Nixon, David C. (2005). "The Supreme Court and Opinion Content: The Use of the Federalist Papers". Political Research Quarterly. 58 (2): 329–340. doi:10.1177/106591290505800212. ISSN 1065-9129.
- Durchslag, Melvyn R. (2005). "The Supreme Court and the Federalist Papers: Is There Less Here Than Meets the Eye?". William & Mary Bill of Rights Journal. 14 (1): 243–349.
- Festa, Matthew J. (2007). "Dueling Federalists: Supreme Court Decisions with Multiple Opinions Citing the Federalist, 1986-2007". Seattle University Law Review. 31: 75–106.
- Lupu, Ira C. (1998). "The Most-Cited Federalist Papers". Constitutional Commentary. 15: 403–410.
- Lupu, Ira C. (1998). "Time the Supreme Court and the Federalist". The George Washington Law Review. 66.
- Maggs, Gregory E. (2007). "A Concise Guide to the Federalist Papers as a Source of the Original Meaning of the United States Constitution". Boston University Law Review. 87: 801–856.
- Mano, Michael J. (2004). "Contemporary Visions of the Early Federalist Ideology of James Madison: An Analysis of the United States Supreme Court's Treatment of The Federalist No. 39". Washington University Journal of Law & Policy. 16: 257–287.
- Martinez, J. Michael; Richardson, William D. (2000). "Federalist Papers and Legal Interpretation". South Dakota Law Review. 45: 307–333.
- McGreal, Paul E. (2002). "Saving Article I from Seminole Tribe: A View from the Federalist Papers". SMU Law Review. 55 (2): 393–426.
- Melton, Buckner F. Jr. (1996). "The Supreme Court and The Federalist: A Citation List and Analysis, 1789-1996". Kentucky Law Journal. 85 (2). ISSN 0023-026X.
- Melton, Buckner F. Jr.; Miller, Jennifer J. (2001). "The Supreme Court and The Federalist: A Supplement, 1996-2001". Kentucky Law Journal. 90: 415–440.
- Pierson, Charles W. (1924). "The Federalist in the Supreme Court". The Yale Law Journal. 33 (7): 728–735. doi:10.2307/788136. JSTOR 788136.
- Tushnet, Mark (1988). "Constitutional Interpretation and Judicial Selection: A View from the Federalist Papers". Southern California Law Review. 61.
- Wilson, James G. (1985). "The Most Sacred Text: The Supreme Court's Use of The Federalist Papers". BYU Law Review (1): 65–135.

== By author ==
=== Alexander Hamilton ===
- Bilmes, Linda J. (2011). "Federalist Nos. 67–77 How Would Publius Envision the Civil Service Today?". Public Administration Review. 71 (s1): s98–s104. doi:10.1111/j.1540-6210.2011.02468.x. ISSN 0033-3352. JSTOR 41317423.
- Dietze, Gottfried (1957). "Hamilton's Federalist Treatise for Free Government". Cornell Law Review. 42 (3): 307–328.
- Edling, Max M. (2020). "'A Vigorous National Government': Hamilton on Security, War, and Revenue". In Rakove, Jack N.; Sheehan, Colleen A. (eds.). The Cambridge Companion to the Federalist Papers. Cambridge University Press. pp. 82–113. ISBN 978-1-107-13639-7.
- McGowan, David (2001). "Ethos in Law and History: Alexander Hamilton, the Federalist, and the Supreme Court". Minnesota Law Review. 85 (3).
- Treanor, William M. (2020). "The Genius of Hamilton and the Birth of the Modern Theory of the Judiciary". In Rakove, Jack N.; Sheehan, Colleen A. (eds.). The Cambridge Companion to the Federalist Papers. Cambridge University Press. pp. 464–514. ISBN 978-1-107-13639-7.

=== John Jay ===
- Blackmun, Harry A. (1988). "John Jay and the Federalist Papers". Pace Law Review. 8 (2): 237. doi:10.58948/2331-3528.1499.
- Dietze, Gottfried (1957). "Jay's Federalist - Treatise for Free Government". Maryland Law Review. 17: 217–230.
- Ferguson, Robert A. (1999). "The Forgotten Publius: John Jay and the Aesthetics of Ratification". Early American Literature. 34 (3): 223–240. ISSN 0012-8163. JSTOR 25057166.
- Taylor, Quentin P. (2020). "John Jay, The Federalist, and the Constitution". In Rakove, Jack N.; Sheehan, Colleen A. (eds.). The Cambridge Companion to the Federalist Papers. Cambridge University Press. pp. 52–81. ISBN 978-1-107-13639-7.

=== James Madison ===
- Cain, Bruce E.; Jones, W. T. (1989). "Madison's Theory of Representation". In Grofman, Bernard; Wittman, Donald A. (eds.). The Federalist Papers and the New Institutionalism. Agathon Press. pp. 11–30. ISBN 978-0-87586-085-5.
- Greene, Francis R. (1994). "Madison's View of Federalism in The Federalist". Publius. 24 (1): 47–62. doi:10.1093/oxfordjournals.pubjof.a038114. ISSN 0048-5950.
- Kobylka, Joseph F.; Carter, Bradley Kent (1987). "Madison, The Federalist, & the Constitutional Order: Human Nature & Institutional Structure". Polity: 190–208. doi:10.2307/3234779. JSTOR 3234779.
- Kramer, Larry D. (2020). "'The Interest of the Man': James Madison's Constitutional Politics". In Rakove, Jack N.; Sheehan, Colleen A. (eds.). The Cambridge Companion to the Federalist Papers. Cambridge University Press. pp. 330–369. ISBN 978-1-107-13639-7.
- Rakove, Jack N. (2020). "Politics Indoors and Out-of-Doors: A Fault Line in Madison's Thinking". In Rakove, Jack N.; Sheehan, Colleen A. (eds.). The Cambridge Companion to the Federalist Papers. Cambridge University Press. pp. 370–399. ISBN 978-1-107-13639-7.
- Rosen, Gary (1996). "James Madison and the Problem of Founding". The Review of Politics. 58 (3): 561–596. doi:10.1017/S0034670500020180. ISSN 1748-6858. JSTOR 1408012.
- Sorenson, Leonard R. (1995). "Madison on Sympathy, Virtue, and Ambition in the Federalist Papers". Polity. 27 (3): 431–446. doi:10.2307/3235006. ISSN 0032-3497. JSTOR 3235006.

== By essay ==
=== Federalist No. 1 ===
- Kochan, Donald J. (2020). "On the Imperative of Civil Discourse: Lessons from Alexander Hamilton and Federalist No. 1" (PDF). Southern California Law Review. 94: 32–43.
- Light, Paul C. (2011). "Federalist No. 1: How Would Publius Define Good Government Today?". Public Administration Review. 71 (s1): s7–s14. doi:10.1111/j.1540-6210.2011.02456.x. ISSN 0033-3352. JSTOR 41317411.

=== Federalist No. 7 ===
- Smith, Daniel L. (2011). "Federalist No. 7: Is Disunion among the States a Hidden Source of Strength?". Public Administration Review. 71 (s1): s15–s21. doi:10.1111/j.1540-6210.2011.02457.x. ISSN 0033-3352. JSTOR 41317412.

=== Federalist No. 10 ===
- Adair, Douglass (1951). "The Tenth Federalist Revisited". William and Mary Quarterly. 8 (1): 48–67. doi:10.2307/1920733. ISSN 0043-5597. JSTOR 1920733.
- Adair, Douglass (1957). ""That Politics May Be Reduced to a Science": David Hume, James Madison, and the Tenth Federalist". Huntington Library Quarterly. 20 (4): 343–360. doi:10.2307/3816276. ISSN 0018-7895. JSTOR 3816276.
- Arkin, Marc M. (1995). "'The Intractable Principle:' David Hume, James Madison, Religion, and the Tenth Federalist". American Journal of Legal History. 39 (2): 148–176. doi:10.2307/845899. ISSN 0002-9319. JSTOR 845899.
- Ashin, Mark (1953). "The Argument of Madison's Federalist, No. 10". College English. 15 (1): 37–45. doi:10.2307/371602. ISSN 0010-0994. JSTOR 371602.
- Bartrum, Ian (2010). "Constructing the Constitutional Canon: The Metonymic Evolution of Federalist 10". Constitutional Commentary. 27: 9–38.
- Box, Richard C. (2015). "The Federalist Papers, Nos. 10, 17, & 51". Public Administration and Society: Critical Issues in American Governance. Routledge. ISBN 978-1-315-70146-2.
- Conniff, James (1980). "The Enlightenment and American Political Thought. A Study of the Origins of Madison's Federalist Number 10". Political Theory. 8 (3): 381–402. doi:10.1177/009059178000800307. ISSN 0090-5917. JSTOR 190920.
- Epstein, David F. (1993). "Remarks on the Federalist Number 10". Harvard Journal of Law & Public Policy. 16.
- Femia, Lisa (2020). "The Madisonian Case for Ranked Choice Voting: Federalist No. 10, Preferential Voting, and the American Democratic Tradition" (PDF). New York University Journal of Legislation and Public Policy. 23: 953–1003.
- Fraenkel, Ernst (1962). "The Federalist Number Ten". Das Amerikanische Regierungssystem: Eine Politologische Analyse [The American System of Government] (in German). VS Verlag fur Sozialwissenschaften. pp. 32–37.
- Gibson, Alan (1991). "Impartial Representation and the Extended Republic: Towards a Comprehensive and Balanced Reading of the Tenth "Federalist" Paper". History of Political Thought. 12 (2): 263–304. ISSN 0143-781X. JSTOR 26213995.
- Gibson, Alan (1993). "The Commercial Republic & the Pluralist Critique of Marxism: An Analysis of Martin Diamond's Interpretation of Federalist 10". Polity. 25 (4): 497–528. doi:10.2307/3235118. ISSN 0032-3497. JSTOR 3235118.
- Gibson, Alan (2020). "Madison's Republican Remedy: The Tenth Federalist and the Creation of an Impartial Republic". In Rakove, Jack N.; Sheehan, Colleen A. (eds.). The Cambridge Companion to the Federalist Papers. Cambridge University Press. pp. 263–301. ISBN 978-1-107-13639-7.
- Holton, Woody (2005). "'Divide et Impera': 'Federalist 10' in a Wider Sphere". William and Mary Quarterly. 62 (2): 175–212. doi:10.2307/3491599. ISSN 0043-5597. JSTOR 3491599.
- Ketcham, Ralph L. (1957). "Notes on James Madison's Sources for the Tenth Federalist Paper". Midwest Journal of Political Science. 1 (1): 20–25. doi:10.2307/2109009. ISSN 0026-3397. JSTOR 2109009.
- Knott, Jack H. (2011). "Federalist No. 10: Are Factions the Problem in Creating Democratic Accountability in the Public Interest?". Public Administration Review. 71 (s1): s29–s36. doi:10.1111/j.1540-6210.2011.02459.x. ISSN 0033-3352. JSTOR 41317414.
- Kohn, Jennifer L. (2012). "Federalist #10 in Management #101: What Madison Has To Teach Managers". Journal of Management Education. 37 (5): 683–703. doi:10.1177/1052562912458889. ISSN 1052-5629.
- Morgan, Edmund S. (1986). "Safety in Numbers: Madison, Hume, and the Tenth Federalist". Huntington Library Quarterly. 49 (2): 95–112. doi:10.2307/3817178. ISSN 0018-7895. JSTOR 3817178.
- Morgan, Robert J. (1974). "Madison's Theory of Representation in the Tenth Federalist". The Journal of Politics. 36 (4): 852–885. doi:10.2307/2129398. ISSN 0022-3816. JSTOR 2129398.
- Paskewich, J. Christopher (2011). "Reconsidering the Status of Federalist 10". Journal of Political Science. 39 (1).
- Peterson, Paul (1987). "The Rhetorical Design and Theoretical Teaching of Federalist No. 10". The Political Science Reviewer. 17: 193–218.
- Rosenbloom, David (2011). "Federalist No. 10: How Do Factions Affect the President as Administrator-in-Chief?". Public Administration Review. 71 (s1): s22–s28. doi:10.1111/j.1540-6210.2011.02458.x. ISSN 0033-3352. JSTOR 41317413.
- Sidhu, Dawinder (2009). "Madison in Post-9/11 Cyberspace: Applying Federalist No. 10 to the Online Battle for 'Hearts and Minds'". Journal of Internet Law. 13 (9): 1–28.
- Thompson, Helen F. (1999). "Gothic Numbers in the New Republic: The Federalist No. 10 and its Spectral Factions". In Byron, Glennis; Punter, David (eds.). Spectral Readings: Towards a Gothic Geography. Palgrave Macmillan. pp. 140–160. doi:10.1057/9780230374614_9. ISBN 978-0-230-37461-4.
- Weiner, Greg (2017). "After Federalist No. 10". National Affairs. 33: 130–144.
- Yoho, James (1995). "Madison on the Beneficial Effects of Interest Groups: What Was Left Unsaid in Federalist 10". Polity. 27 (4): 587–605. doi:10.2307/3234961. ISSN 0032-3497. JSTOR 3234961.

=== Federalist No. 17 ===
- Box, Richard C. (2015). "The Federalist Papers, Nos. 10, 17, & 51". Public Administration and Society: Critical Issues in American Governance. Routledge. ISBN 978-1-315-70146-2.

=== Federalist No. 23 ===
- Newcomer, Kathryn E.; Kee, James Edwin (2011). "Federalist No. 23: Can the Leviathan Be Managed?". Public Administration Review. 71 (s1): s37–s46. doi:10.1111/j.1540-6210.2011.02460.x. ISSN 0033-3352. JSTOR 41317415.

=== Federalist No. 27 ===
- Newbold, Stephanie P. (2011). "Federalist No. 27: Is Transparency Essential for Public Confidence in Government?". Public Administration Review. 71 (s1): s47–s52. doi:10.1111/j.1540-6210.2011.02461.x. ISSN 0033-3352. JSTOR 41317416.

=== Federalist No. 30 ===
- Posner, Paul L. (2011). "Federalist No. 30: What Is to Be Done About the Federal Budget?". Public Administration Review. 71 (s1): s53–s61. doi:10.1111/j.1540-6210.2011.02462.x. ISSN 0033-3352. JSTOR 41317417.

=== Federalist No. 32 ===
- McGreal, Paul E. (2002). "Saving Article I from Seminole Tribe: A View from the Federalist Papers". SMU Law Review. 55 (2): 393–426.

=== Federalist No. 35 ===
- Allen, William B. (1976). "Federal Representation: The Design of the Thirty-Fifth Federalist Paper". Publius. 6 (3): 61–71. doi:10.1093/oxfordjournals.pubjof.a038405. ISSN 0048-5950. JSTOR 3329525.

=== Federalist No. 37 ===
- Estes, Todd (2023). "The Emergence and Fundamental Centrality of James Madison's Federalist 37: Historians, Political Theorists, and the Recentering of Meaning in The Federalist". American Political Thought. 12 (3): 424–452. doi:10.1086/725846. ISSN 2161-1580.
- O'Hanlon, Stephen (2012). "Federalist 37: Man, Language, and Theory". Canadian Journal of Law & Jurisprudence. 25 (1): 137–157. doi:10.1017/S0841820900005385. ISSN 0841-8209.

=== Federalist No. 39 ===
- Mano, Michael J. (2004). "Contemporary Visions of the Early Federalist Ideology of James Madison: An Analysis of the United States Supreme Court's Treatment of The Federalist No. 39". Washington University Journal of Law & Policy. 16: 257–287.

=== Federalist No. 41 ===
- Bertelli, Anthony M. (2011). "Federalist No. 41: Does Polarization Inhibit Coordination?". Public Administration Review. 71 (s1): s62–s67. doi:10.1111/j.1540-6210.2011.02463.x. ISSN 0033-3352. JSTOR 41317418.

=== Federalist No. 44 ===
- Agranoff, Robert (2011). "Federalist No. 44: What Is the Role of Intergovernmental Relations in Federalism?". Public Administration Review. 71 (s1): s68–s77. doi:10.1111/j.1540-6210.2011.02464.x. ISSN 0033-3352. JSTOR 41317419.

=== Federalist No. 47 ===
- Rotella, Salvatore G. (1967). "Montesquieu and the Federalist. a Research Note on Federalist 47". Il Politico. 32 (4): 825–832. ISSN 0032-325X. JSTOR 43206788.

=== Federalist No. 48 ===
- Clement, Paul D. "The Federalist No. 48, the Separation of Powers, and 'the Impetuous Vortex'" (PDF). Harvard Journal of Law & Public Policy. 44 (1).

=== Federalist No. 51 ===
- Bingham, Lisa Blomgren; O'Leary, Rosemary (2011). "Federalist No. 51: Is the Past Relevant to Today's Collaborative Public Management?". Public Administration Review. 71 (s1): s78–s82. doi:10.1111/j.1540-6210.2011.02465.x. ISSN 0033-3352. JSTOR 41317420.
- Box, Richard C. (2015). "The Federalist Papers, Nos. 10, 17, & 51". Public Administration and Society: Critical Issues in American Governance. Routledge. ISBN 978-1-315-70146-2.
- Lynn, Laurence E. Jr. (2011). "Federalist No. 51: Is Liberty Guaranteed by Structures?". Public Administration Review. 71 (s1): s83–s89. doi:10.1111/j.1540-6210.2011.02466.x. ISSN 0033-3352. JSTOR 41317421.
- Pandich, Scott C. (2007). "Six out of Seven: The Missing Sin of Federalist 51". Perspectives on Political Science. 36 (3): 148–152. doi:10.3200/PPSC.36.3.148-152. ISSN 1045-7097.

=== Federalist No. 67 ===
- Kersh, Rogan (2011). "Federalist No. 67: Can the Executive Sustain Both Republican and Energetic Government?". Public Administration Review. 71 (s1): s90–s97. doi:10.1111/j.1540-6210.2011.02467.x. ISSN 0033-3352. JSTOR 41317422.

=== Federalist No. 70 ===
- Arnold, Peri E. (2011). "Federalist No. 70: Can the Public Service Survive in the Contest Between Hamilton's Aspirations and Madison's Reality?". Public Administration Review. 71 (s1): s105–s111. doi:10.1111/j.1540-6210.2011.02469.x. ISSN 0033-3352. JSTOR 41317424.
- Pfiffner, James P. (2011). "Federalist No. 70: Is the President Too Powerful?". Public Administration Review. 71 (s1): s112–s117. doi:10.1111/j.1540-6210.2011.02470.x. ISSN 0033-3352. JSTOR 41317425.
- Wedel, Janine R. (2011). "Federalist No. 70: Where Does the Public Service Begin and End?". Public Administration Review. 71 (s1): s118–s127. doi:10.1111/j.1540-6210.2011.02471.x. ISSN 0033-3352. JSTOR 41317426.

=== Federalist No. 71 ===
- Khademian, Anne M. (2011). "Federalist No. 71: Does Duration in Office Provide Vigilant Autonomy in the Regulatory Process?". Public Administration Review. 71 (s1): s135–s142. doi:10.1111/j.1540-6210.2011.02473.x. ISSN 0033-3352. JSTOR 41317428.
- Radin, Beryl A. (2011). "Federalist No. 71: Can the Federal Government Be Held Accountable for Performance?". Public Administration Review. 71 (s1): s128–s134. doi:10.1111/j.1540-6210.2011.02472.x. ISSN 0033-3352. JSTOR 41317427.

=== Federalist No. 72 ===
- Perry, James L. (2011). "Federalist No. 72: What Happened to the Public Service Ideal?". Public Administration Review. 71 (s1): s134–s147. doi:10.1111/j.1540-6210.2011.02474.x. ISSN 0033-3352. JSTOR 41317429.

=== Federalist No. 76 ===
- Lee, Emery G. III (2004). "The Federalist in an Age of Faction: Rethinking Federalist No. 76 on the Senate's Role in the Judicial Confirmations Process". Ohio Northern University Law Review. 30.
- Mackenzie, G. Calvin (2011). "Federalist No. 76: Does the Presidential Appointments Process Guarantee Control of Government?". Public Administration Review. 71 (s1): s148–s154. doi:10.1111/j.1540-6210.2011.02475.x. ISSN 0033-3352. JSTOR 41317430.

=== Federalist No. 77 ===
- Bailey, Jeremy D. (2010). "The Traditional View of Hamilton's Federalist No. 77 and an Unexpected Challenge: A Response to Seth Barrett Tillman" (PDF). Harvard Journal of Law & Public Policy. 33 (1): 169–184.
- Tillman, Seth Barrett (2010). "The Puzzle of Hamilton's Federalist No. 77" (PDF). Harvard Journal of Law & Public Policy. 33 (1): 149–167.

=== Federalist No. 78 ===
- Slonim, Shlomo (2006). "Federalist No. 78 and Brutus' Neglected Thesis on Judicial Supremacy". Constitutional Commentary. 23: 7–31.

=== Federalist No. 81 ===
- McGreal, Paul E. (2002). "Saving Article I from Seminole Tribe: A View from the Federalist Papers". SMU Law Review. 55 (2): 393–426.

=== Federalist No. 85 ===
- Light, Paul C. (2011). "Federalist No. 85: Has the National Government Become an "Awful Spectacle"?". Public Administration Review. 71 (s1): s155–s159. doi:10.1111/j.1540-6210.2011.02476.x. ISSN 0033-3352. JSTOR 41317431.
