= Statute =

Formal written document that creates law

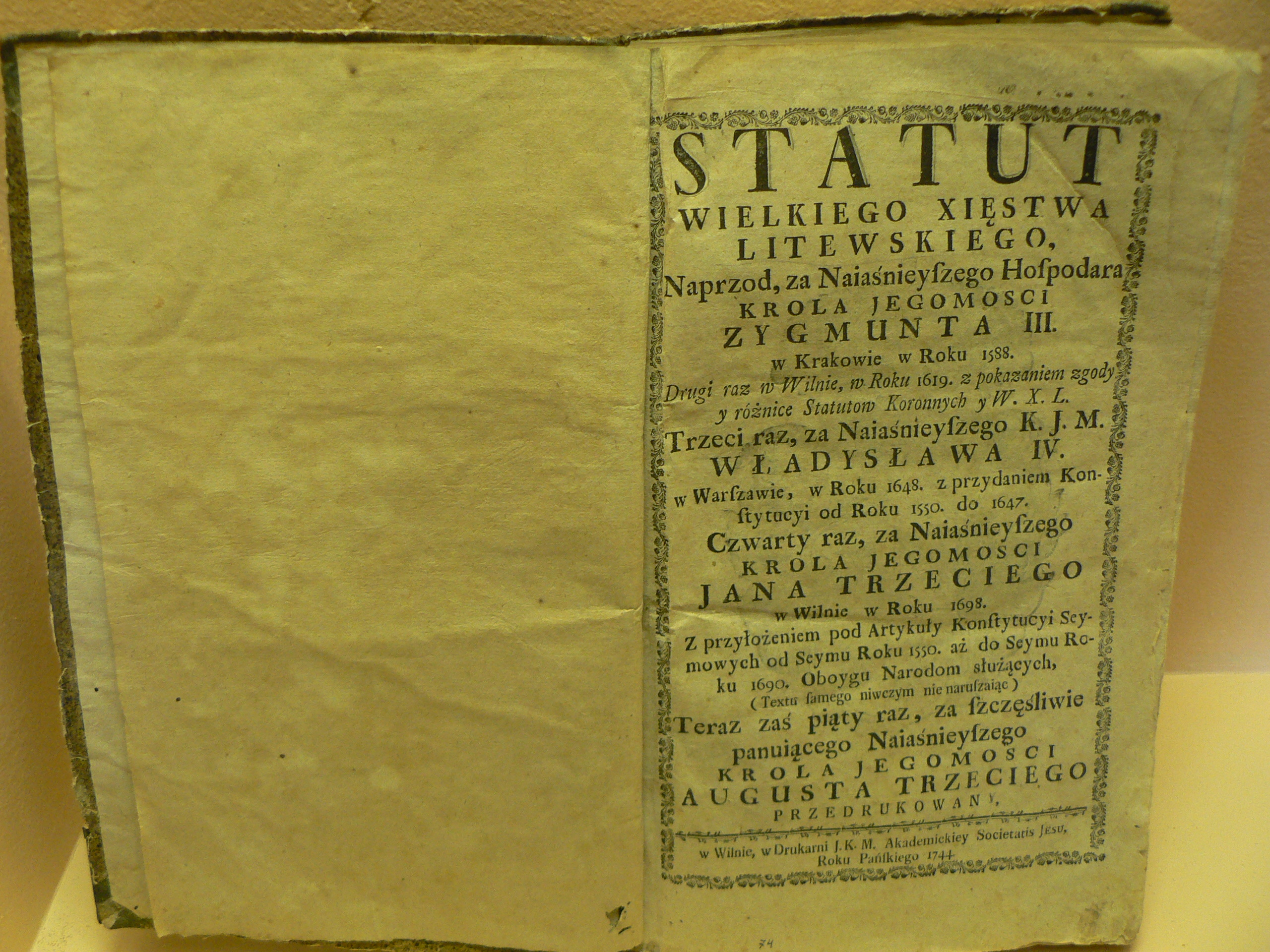
Statute of Grand Duchy of Lithuania, written in Polish

A statute is a law or formal written enactment of a legislature. Statutes typically declare, command or prohibit something. Statutes are distinguished from court law and unwritten law (also known as common law) in that they are the expressed will of a legislative body, whether that be on the behalf of a country, state or province, county, municipality, or so on. They are also distinguished from secondary legislation, or regulations, that are issued by an executive body under authority granted by a statute. Depending on the legal system, a statute may also be referred to as an "act".

== Etymology ==
The word appears in use in English as early as the 14th century. "Statute" and earlier English spellings were derived from the Old French words statut, estatut, estatu, meaning "(royal) promulgation, (legal) statute." These terms were in turn derived from the Late Latin statutum, meaning "a law, decree".

== Publication and organization ==
In virtually all countries, newly enacted statutes are published and distributed so that everyone can look up the statutory law. This can be done in the form of a government gazette, which may include other kinds of legal notices released by the government, or in the form of a series of books whose content is limited to legislative acts. In either form, statutes are traditionally published in chronological order based on date of enactment.

A universal problem encountered by lawmakers throughout human history is how to organize published statutes. Such publications have a habit of starting small but growing rapidly over time, as new statutes are enacted in response to the exigencies of the moment. Eventually, persons trying to find the law are forced to sort through an enormous number of statutes enacted at various points in time to determine which portions are still in effect.

The solution adopted in many countries is to organize existing statutory law in topical arrangements (or "codified") within publications called codes, then ensure that new statutes are consistently drafted so that they add, amend, repeal or move various code sections. In turn, in theory, the code will thenceforth reflect the current cumulative state of the statutory law in that jurisdiction. In many nations statutory law is distinguished from and subordinate to constitutional law.

== Alternative meanings ==
=== International law ===
The term "statute" is also used to refer to an International treaty that establishes an institution, such as the Statute of the European Central Bank, a protocol to the international courts as well, such as the Statute of the International Court of Justice and the Rome Statute of the International Criminal Court. "Statute" is also another word for law. The term was adapted from England in about the 18th century.

=== Autonomy statute ===
In the autonomous communities of Spain, an autonomy statute is a legal document similar to the constitution of a federated state, save that it is enacted by the national legislature, rather than the autonomous community it governs. The autonomy statutes in Spain have the rank of ley orgánica (organic law), a category of special legislation reserved for the main institutions and issues and mentioned in the constitution (the highest ranking legal instrument in Spain). Leyes orgánicas rank between the constitution and ordinary laws. The name was chosen, among others, to avoid confusion with the term constitution (i.e. the Spanish constitution of 1978).

=== Organizational statutes ===
The by-laws of some universities, particularly in the United Kingdom, are termed statutes. Revision of these normally requires permission from the Privy Council. An episcopal conference of national Catholic bishops is required by canon law to adopt statutes which govern its functions and operations.

== Types ==
- Public and private bills
- Organic statute
- Super statute

== See also ==
- Statutory interpretation
