= Senator Tilghman =

Senator Tilghman may refer to:

- Bill Tilghman (1854–1924), Oklahoma State Senate
- Matthew Tilghman (1718–1790), Maryland State Senate
- Richard Tilghman (1920–2017), Pennsylvania State Senate

== See also ==
- Senator Tillman (disambiguation)
