= Polity (disambiguation) =

A polity is, broadly, any kind of political grouping.

Polity may also refer to:

== Businesses and Organisations ==
- Polity (publisher), a British publisher of academic textbooks
- Ecclesiastical polity, any system of church governance

== Other uses ==
- Polity (journal), a journal of political science
- The Polity, Neal Asher's science fiction universe
- Polity data series, state democraticity ranking project
