= Lawrence Coughlin =

American lawyer and politician

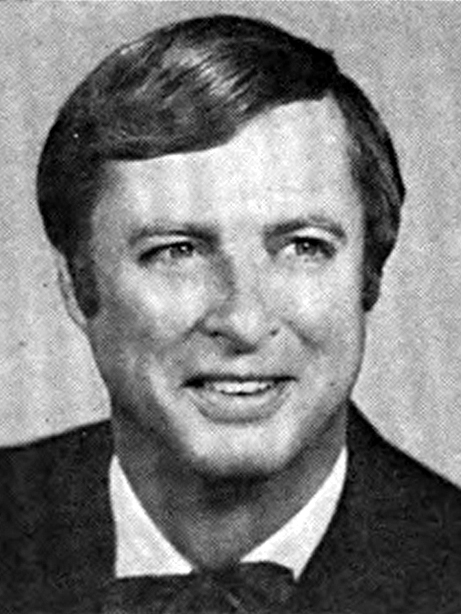

Member of the U.S. House of Representatives from Pennsylvania's 13th district
- In office January 3, 1969 – January 3, 1993
- Preceded by: Richard Schweiker
- Succeeded by: Marjorie Margolies-Mezvinsky

Member of the Pennsylvania Senate from the 17th district
- In office January 2, 1967 – January 3, 1969
- Preceded by: Robert P. Johnson
- Succeeded by: Richard A. Tilghman

Member of the Pennsylvania House of Representatives from the Montgomery County district
- In office January 1965 – November 30, 1966

Personal details
- Born: Robert Lawrence Coughlin; April 11, 1929 Wilkes-Barre, Pennsylvania, U.S.
- Died: November 30, 2001 (aged 72) Mathews, Virginia, U.S.
- Party: Republican

Robert Lawrence Coughlin Jr. (April 11, 1929 – November 30, 2001) was an American lawyer and politician from Pennsylvania who served as a Republican member of the United States House of Representatives representing the 13th district of Pennsylvania from 1969 to 1993. He also served as a member of the Pennsylvania House of Representatives for the Montgomery County district from 1965 to 1966 and the Pennsylvania Senate for the 17th district from 1967 to 1969.

== Early life and education ==
R. Lawrence Coughlin was born in Wilkes-Barre, Pennsylvania, to Robert Lawrence and Evelyn (née Wich) Coughlin. His uncle was Clarence D. Coughlin, who represented Pennsylvania's 11th congressional district from 1921 to 1923. He was raised on his father's farm near Scranton, and graduated from the Hotchkiss School in Lakeville, Connecticut, in 1946.

Coughlin then enrolled at Yale University, where he majored in economics and was a member of St. Anthony Hall. He was also a classmate of George H. W. Bush, the future President of the United States. After graduating from Yale in 1950, he received a Master of Business Administration degree from the Harvard Business School in 1954. His studies at Harvard were interrupted during the Korean War, when he served as a captain in the United States Marine Corps and an aide to Lieutenant General Chesty Puller (1950–1952).

Following his military service, Coughlin entered the Temple University School of Law in Philadelphia, attending classes at night while working as a foreman on an assembly line at a steel company during the day. He received a Bachelor of Laws degree from Temple in 1958.

== Early career ==
In 1959, Coughlin was admitted to the bar and joined the law firm of Saul Ewing in Philadelphia. He was elected as a Republican to the Pennsylvania House of Representatives in 1964, representing one of Montgomery County's at-large seats. After serving one term in the House, he was elected to the Pennsylvania State Senate, where he represented the 17th District from 1967 to 1969. As a state legislator, he served on the Joint State Government Commission Task Force on Penal Laws.

== U.S. House of Representatives ==
In 1968, after incumbent Richard Schweiker decided to run for the United States Senate, Coughlin successfully ran for the United States House of Representatives from Pennsylvania's 13th congressional district. The district, based in Montgomery County and dominated by the Republican Party, included the affluent suburban communities of the Main Line and, in the 1980s, was reapportioned to include parts of Philadelphia. After winning the Republican nomination, he defeated his Democratic opponent, Robert D. Gates, by a margin of 62% to 37%.

During his tenure in Congress, Coughlin earned a reputation as a moderate to liberal Republican. A member of the House Appropriations Subcommittee on Transportation, he supported increased funding for the Southeastern Pennsylvania Transportation Authority and other mass transportation agencies, housing programs, and anti-drug education. He was also a member of the House Select Committee on Narcotics Abuse and Control, in which capacity he supported additional funding for the destruction of cocaine processing labs and reducing efforts to interdict narcotics traffic. He also became known for always wearing a bow tie.

Coughlin was re-elected eleven times, but declined to run again in 1992. His two most competitive campaigns for re-election came in 1984 and 1986, facing Democratic state Representative Joe Hoeffel both times.

== Later life and death ==
After retiring from Congress, Coughlin remained in Washington, D.C., and joined the law firm of Eckert Seamans Cherin & Mellott. He joined the law firm of Thompson Coburn in 2001, and also served as president of the Friends of the United States National Arboretum.

Coughlin died from cancer at his home in Mathews, Virginia, at age 71. He is buried at Arlington National Cemetery.

== Personal life ==
He was married three times. First to Helen Combs Swan in 1950; they had one daughter, Elizabeth (Lisa) Swan Coughlin. After Helen died in 1953, he married Elizbeth Poole Sellers Worrell; they had three children, Lynne Wick Coughlin, Sara Sellars Coughlin, and Robert Lawrence (Larry) Coughlin III. He married Susan MacGregor in 1981.

Pennsylvania House of Representatives
Preceded by	Member of the Pennsylvania House of Representatives from Montgomery County; 1965–1966	Succeeded by
Pennsylvania State Senate
Preceded by Robert P. Johnson	Member of the Pennsylvania State Senate from the 17th district 1967–1969	Succeeded by Richard A. Tilghman
U.S. House of Representatives
Preceded by Richard S. Schweiker	Member of the U.S. House of Representatives from Pennsylvania's 13th congressional district 1969–1993	Succeeded by Marjorie Margolies-Mezvinsky
