= Tim Briggs (politician) =

American politician

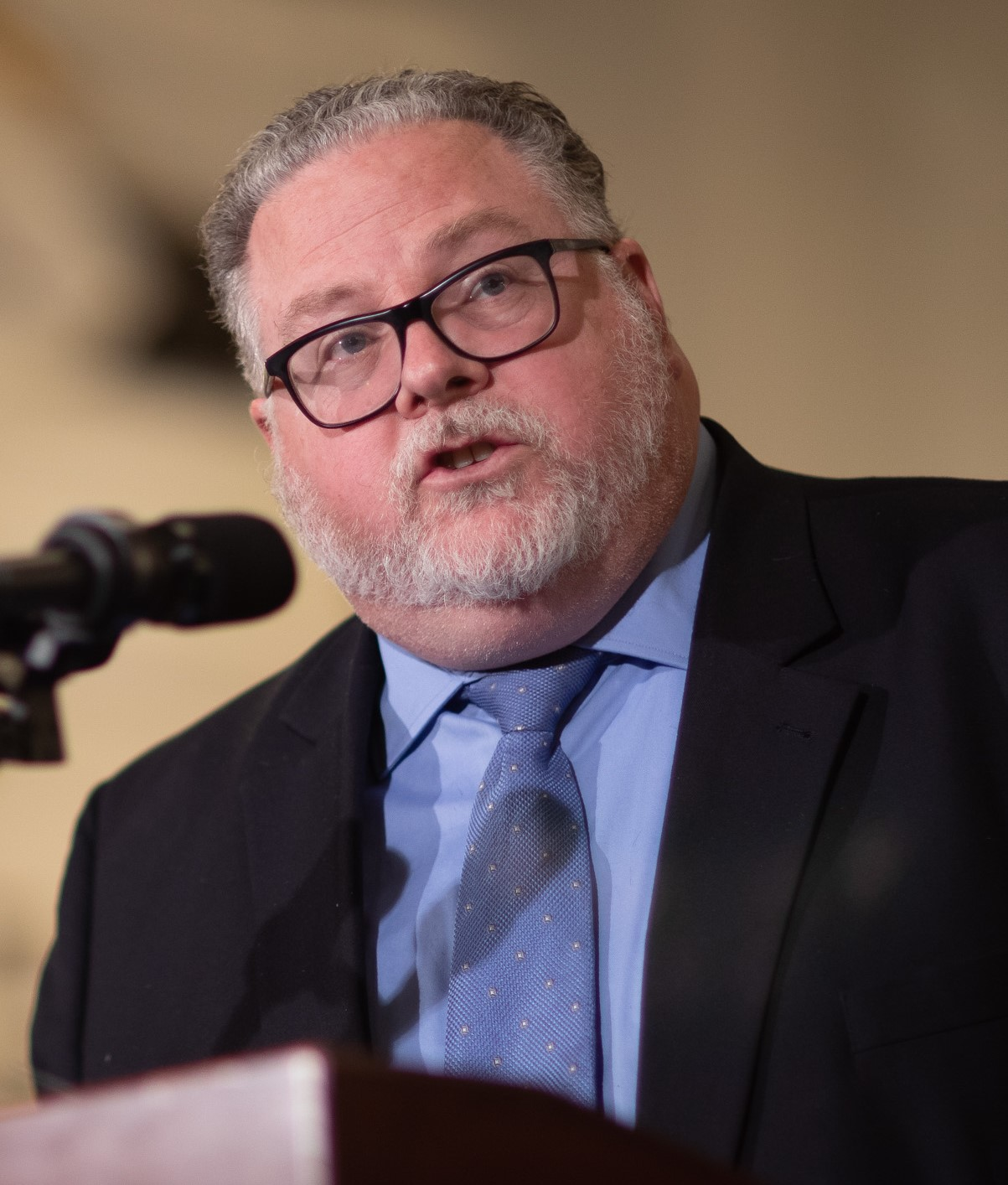

Member of the Pennsylvania House of Representatives from the 149th district
- Incumbent
- Assumed office January 6, 2009
- Preceded by: Daylin Leach

Personal details
- Born: January 3, 1970 (age 56) Norristown, Pennsylvania, U.S.
- Party: Democratic
- Spouse: Robyn Traverso Briggs
- Children: 4
- Education: West Chester University; Temple University Beasley School of Law
- Occupation: Attorney, politician

Timothy P. Briggs (born January 3, 1970) is an American politician and lawyer who serves as a Democratic member of the Pennsylvania House of Representatives, representing the 149th District since 2009.

== Early life ==
Tim Briggs was born in Norristown, Pennsylvania, to Joseph and Terese Briggs. He graduated from Crystal Lake South High School in Illinois in 1988. He then attended West Chester University, where he received a Bachelor of Arts degree in political science in 1992. He also minored in geography and international relations.

Briggs served as an advisor to Congressman Joe Hoeffel and state Senator Constance H. Williams and was the Political Director of The Bonner Group, a Washington, D.C.–based progressive non-profit and Democratic political fundraising firm. For several years, he served as a volunteer firefighter and sat on the board of directors for Big Brothers Big Sisters in Montgomery County. He received a Juris Doctor degree from Temple University Beasley School of Law in 2004. He became an associate with the law firm Hamburg, Rubin, Mullin, Maxwell & Lupin in 2008, and is currently of-counsel at Kilkenny Law, LLC.

== Political career ==
In 2008, after Democratic incumbent Daylin Leach decided to run for the Pennsylvania State Senate, Briggs successfully ran for the Pennsylvania House of Representatives in the 149th District. He defeated Republican Lynne Lechter, a King of Prussia lawyer, by a margin of 62–38%. He was re-elected to a second term in 2010, defeating Bridgeport councilman Peter Kohut by 62–37%. He was re-elected to a third term against Republican Perry Hamilton by a margin of 66% to 34%. In November 2016, he ran against Republican nominee Chira Smith and was overwhelmingly re-elected to a fifth term.

Briggs currently serves as the Democratic chairman of the House Judiciary Committee and serves on many House caucuses including serving as the Democratic chair of the Arts & Culture Caucus and the Bio Technology/Life Sciences Caucus, and is the chairman of the Brain injury Caucus. He serves on the board of governors for the Pennsylvania State System of Higher Education, a commissioner on the Pennsylvania Commission Crime and Delinquency and vice chairman of the Valley Forge Tourism and Convention Board. He has focused on issues concerning education, children, and the environment.
