= Committee of safety (American Revolution) =

Local committees of American Patriots

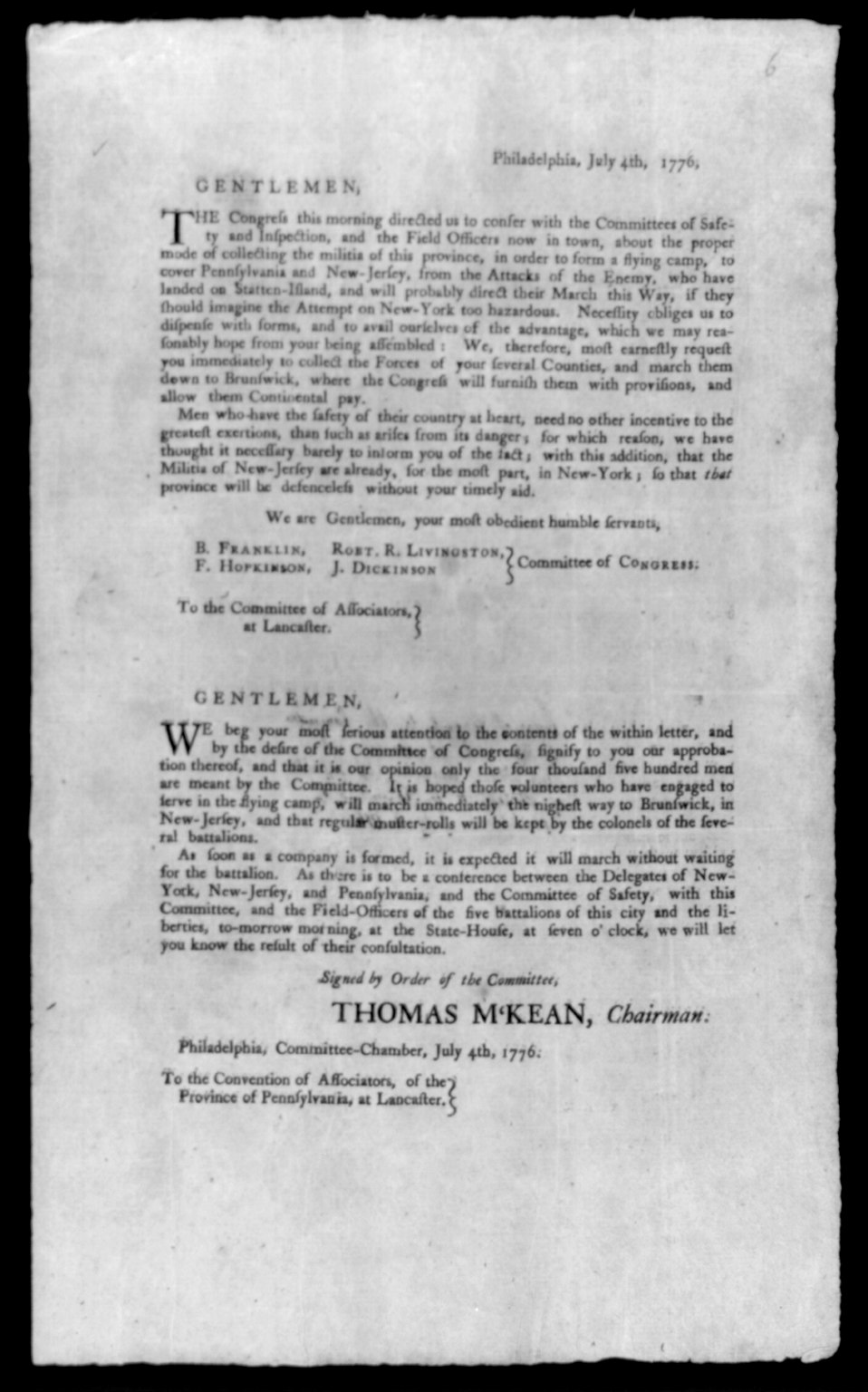
A July 4, 1776, notice sent by the Second Continental Congress to a Committee of Safety organized in Lancaster in the colonial-era Province of Pennsylvania

In the American Revolution, committees of correspondence, committees of inspection, also known as committees of observation and committees of safety, were different local committees of Patriots that became a shadow government; they took control of the Thirteen Colonies away from royal officials, who became increasingly helpless.

In the Province of Massachusetts Bay, as affairs drew toward a crisis, it became usual for towns to appoint three committees: of correspondence, of inspection, and of safety. The first was to keep the community informed of dangers either legislative or executive, and concert measures of public good; the second to watch for violations of sanctions, or attempts of loyalists to evade them; the third to act as general executive while the legal authority was in abeyance. In February 1776 these were regularly legalized by the Massachusetts General Court but consolidated into one called the "Committee of Correspondence, Inspection, and Safety" to be elected annually by the towns.

== Committees of correspondence ==
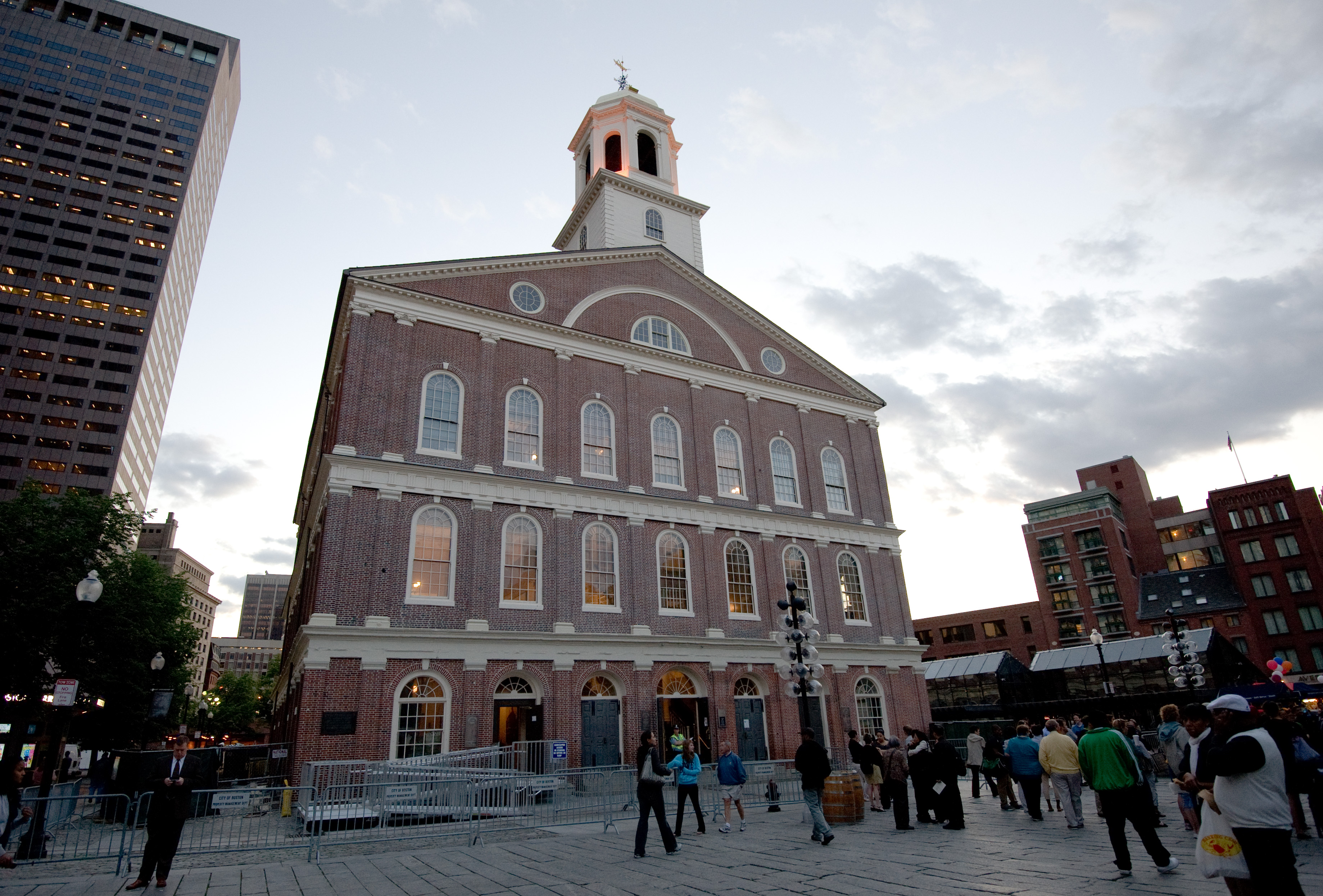
Faneuil Hall in Boston, where a Committee of Safety convened on November 21, 1772

Committees of correspondence were public functionaries, and first existed in England, created by the parliamentary party of the 17th century in their struggles with the Stuarts. In 1763, when the English government attempted to enforce the trade and navigation acts on the American colonies after the Peace of Paris, the colonial leaders advised the merchants to hold meetings and appoint committees to memorialize the legislature and correspond with each other to forward a union of interests. This was done in Massachusetts, Rhode Island, and New York 1763–64.

On November 21, 1772, a town meeting at Faneuil Hall in Boston, appointed a correspondence committee of 21 to communicate with other Massachusetts towns concerning infringements of popular rights. Until late in 1774, the committee remained the real executive body of Boston and largely of the province. The Boston committee, by legal town meeting, was made the executive of Boston. Under its direction the tea was thrown into the harbor, and the Tea Act of 1773 roused the remaining colonies: Georgia in September, Maryland and Delaware in October, North Carolina in December, New York and New Jersey in February, chose legislative committees of correspondence. New municipalities later joined the movement, including several in New Hampshire, Rhode Island, and New York City.

After the Boston Port Bill came into effect the Boston committee invited those of eight other towns to meet in Faneuil Hall, and the meeting sent circulars to the other colonies recommending suspension of trade with Great Britain, while the legislative committee was directed by the House to send copies of the Port Bill to other colonies, and call attention to it as an attempt to suppress American liberty. The organization of the committees was at once enormously extended; almost every town, city, or county had one. In the middle and southern colonies the committees were empowered, by the terms of their appointment, to elect deputies to meet with those of other committees, to consult on measures for the public good.

== Committees of inspection ==
Resolution 11, passed by the First Continental Congress in Philadelphia, established Committees of Inspection in every county, city, and town to enforce the Continental Association. Hundreds of committees of inspection were formed following the First Continental Congress's declaration of the Continental Association, a boycott of British goods, in October 1774. In New York City, it was called the Committee of Observation or Committee of Sixty.

The focus of the committees was initially on enforcing the Non-importation Agreements, which aimed to hinder the import of British manufactured goods. However, as the revolutionary crisis continued, the committees rapidly took on greater powers, filling the vacuum left by the colonial governments; the committees began to collect taxes and recruit soldiers. Kathleen Burk writes, "It is significant that the Committees believed that they derived their authority from the Continental Congress, not from the provincial assemblies or congresses."

== Committees of safety ==
Committees of Safety were a later outcome of the committees of correspondence. Committees of safety were executive bodies that governed during adjournments of, were created by, and derived their authority from, provincial assemblies or congresses, like those of the New York Provincial Congress. The Committees of safety were emergency panels of leading citizens, who passed laws, handed down regulations, enacted statutes, and did other fundamental business prior to the Declaration of Independence in July 1776 and the passage of individual state constitutions. As they assumed power to govern, however, they generally chose to observe rough legal procedures, warning and shaming enemies rather than killing them. Two examples of the rough legal proceedings were forced public confessions and apologies for slander or more violently, roughing up an individual for voting against giving the poorer Bostonians supplies. Many of the men that had served on their individual states' Committees of safety were later delegates for the Continental Congress.

== Importance ==
T. H. Breen, a professor of American history at Northwestern University, writes that "proliferation of local committees represented a development of paramount importance in the achievement of independence," because the committees were the first step in the creation of "a formal structure capable not only of policing the revolution on the ground but also of solidifying ties with other communities." The network of committees were also vital for reinforcing "a shared sense of purpose," speaking to "an imagined collectivity—a country of the mind" of Americans.

For ordinary people, they were community forums where personal loyalties were revealed, tested, and occasionally punished. ... Serving on committees of safety ... was certainly not an activity for the faint of heart. The members of these groups exposed ideological dissenters, usually people well-known in the communities in which they lived. Although the committees attempted as best they could to avoid physical violence, they administered revolutionary justice as they alone defined it. They worked out their own investigative procedures, interrogated people suspected of undermining the American cause, and meted out punishments they deemed appropriate to the crimes. By mid-1775 the committees increasingly busied themselves with identifying, denouncing, and shunning political offenders. By demanding that enemies receive "civil excommunication" – the chilling words of a North Carolina committee – these groups silenced critics without sparking the kind of bloodbath that has characterized so many other insurgencies throughout the world.

The strengthening of the committees of correspondence in the 1770s also marked the creation of what Gordon S. Wood terms "a new kind of popular politics in America." Wood writes that "the rhetoric of liberty now brought to the surface long-latent political tendencies. Ordinary people were no longer willing to trust only wealthy and learned gentlemen to represent them ... various artisan, religious, and ethnic groups now felt that their particular interests were so distinct that only people of their kind could speak for them. In 1774 radicals in Philadelphia demanded that seven artisans and six Germans be added to the revolutionary committee of the city."

The development of coalition and interest-group politics greatly alarmed both royal officials and more conservative Patriots. For example, William Henry Drayton, the prominent South Carolina planter who had studied at Oxford University, complained about the participation of cobblers and butchers, stating that "Nature never intended that such men should be profound politicians, or able statesmen. In 1775, the royal governor of Georgia "noted in astonishment that the committee in control of Savannah consisted of 'a Parcel of the Lowest People, chiefly carpenters, shoemakers, Blacksmiths etc with a Jew at their head." (Note: The reference to "a Jew at their head" is to Mordecai Sheftall.)

Very few records of committees of safety survive. Committee activities are attested to primarily through newspapers and published material.

By 1775, the committees had become counter-governments that gradually replaced royal authority and took control of local governments. They regulated the economy, politics, morality, and militia of their individual communities. In North Carolina in December 1776, they came under the control of a more powerful central authority, the Council of Safety.

Eighteen years later, at the height of the French Revolution, France was ruled by its own Committee of Public Safety. The French revolutionaries were familiar with the American struggle — for them, the most recent and significant precedent of a Republican revolution.

== Bibliography ==
- Dawson, Henry (1886). Westchester County, New York, During the American Revolution. H.B. Dawson.
