= Helen Hartley =

Helen Hartley may refer to:

- Helen-Ann Hartley (born 1973), a Church of England bishop
- Helen Hartley Jenkins (1860–1934), an American philanthropist

== See also ==
- Ellen Harley (born 1946), Republican member of the Pennsylvania House of Representatives (1991–1994)
- Helen Hatley, character from The Thick of It, played by Rebecca Gethings
