= Richard McClatchey =

American politician

Richard A. McClatchey, Jr.

Member of the Pennsylvania House of Representatives from the 149th district
- In office January 7, 1969 – November 30, 1988
- Preceded by: District created
- Succeeded by: James Clark

Personal details
- Born: November 6, 1929
- Died: February 26, 2004 (aged 74)
- Party: Republican

Richard A. McClatchey, Jr. (November 6, 1929 – February 26, 2004) was a Republican member of the Pennsylvania House of Representatives.
