= Pennsylvania's 17th Senate district =

American legislative district

Pennsylvania's 17th State Senate district
Senator
Amanda Cappelletti; D–East Norriton Township
- Population (2021): 258,156

Pennsylvania State Senate District 17 includes parts of Delaware County and Montgomery County. It is currently represented by Democrat Amanda Cappelletti.

== District profile ==
The district includes the following areas:

Delaware County:

- Haverford Township
- Radnor Township

Montgomery County:

- Bridgeport
- East Norriton Township
- Lower Merion Township
- Narberth
- Norristown
- Upper Merion Township
- West Conshohocken
- West Norriton Township

== Senators ==
Representative	Party	Years	District home	Note
Joseph Hiester	Jeffersonian Republican	1791 – 1792		Pennsylvania State Representative from 1787 to 1790. U.S. Representative from Pennsylvania's 5th congressional district from 1797 to 1803, Pennsylvania's 3rd congressional district from 1803 to 1805 and Pennsylvania's 7th congressional district from 1815 to 1820. 5th Governor of Pennsylvania from 1820 to 1823.
Presley Carr Lane	Independent Republican	1807 – 1814		Speaker of the Senate from 1807 to 1814
William Davidson	Independent Republican	1817 – 1824		Democratic member of the Pennsylvania House of Representative from 1814 to 1818 including as Speaker of the House from 1817 to 1818
William Rudolph Smith	Federalist	1821 – 1824		Attorney General for Wisconsin from 1855 to 1856
Christian Garber	Democratic-Republican	1823 – 1828		
Thomas Jackson	Democratic	1829 – 1832		
George McCulloch	Democratic	1835 – 1836		U.S. Representative for Pennsylvania's 14th congressional district from 1839 to 1841
Isaac Leet	Democratic	1837 – 1838		Pennsylvania State Senator for the 20th district from 1833 to 1836. U.S. Representative from Pennsylvania's 21st congressional district from 1839 to 1841.
John Hoge Ewing	Republican	1837 – 1842		Pennsylvania State Representative from 1835 to 1836. Speaker of the Senate from 1841 to 1842. U.S. Representative for Pennsylvania's 20th congressional district from 1845 to 1847.
Walter Craig	Whig	1843 – 1844		Pennsylvania State Senator for the 23rd district from 1845 to 1846
Adam Ebaugh	Democratic	1843 – 1845		
Philip A. Smyser	Whig	1847		
Henry Fulton	Democratic	1849 – 1850		Pennsylvania State Senator for the 12th district from 1851 to 1852
George Sanderson	Whig	1851 – 1853		10th mayor of Lancaster, Pennsylvania
William Henry Welsh	Democratic	1855 – 1859		
Elijah Reed Myer	Republican	1857 – 1858		Pennsylvania State Senator for the 9th district from 1859 to 1860
John M. Dunlap	Republican	1863 – 1865		
Benjamin Champneys	Democratic	1865 – 1866		Pennsylvania State Representative from 1825 to 1826, 1828 to 1829 and 1863. Pennsylvania Attorney General from 1846 to 1848. Pennsylvania State Senator for the 6th district from 1843 to 1844 and the 16th district from 1863 to 1864
Joseph W. Fisher	Republican	1867 – 1868		Pennsylvania State Representative from 1848 to 1849. Chief justice of the territorial courts in Wyoming Territory from 1871 to 1879.
Esaias Billingfelt	Republican	1867 – 1871		
Andrew Hemphill Dill	Democratic	1871 – 1877		
Jacob George Heilman	Republican	1873 – 1875		
George F. Meily	Republican	1877 – 1880		
Cyrus Ressley Lantz	Republican	1881 – 1884		
John Peter Shindel Gobin	Republican	1885 – 1898		7th Lieutenant Governor of Pennsylvania
Samuel Weiss	Republican	1899 – 1904		
Daniel P. Gerberich	Republican	1905 – 1916		
Horace Leander Haldeman	Republican	1915 – 1916		
Cleon N. Berntheizel	Republican	1921 – 1924		
William C. Freeman	Republican	1925 – 1932		
Henry J. Pierson	Republican	1933 – 1940		
Clarence D. Becker	Republican	1943 – 1948		
Harold W. Risser	Republican	1947 – 1948		
G. Graybill Diehm	Republican	1949 – 1956		
Thomas Alexander Ehrgood	Republican	1957 – 1964		
Robert P. Johnson	Republican	1965 – 1966		
Robert Lawrence Coughlin	Republican	1967 – 1968		Pennsylvania State Representative for the Montgomery County district from 1965 to 1966. U.S. Representative for Pennsylvania's 13th congressional district from 1969 to 1993
Richard A. Tilghman	Republican	1969 – 2001		Pennsylvania State Representative for the Montgomery County district from 1967 to 1968
Constance H. Williams	Democratic	2001 – 2008		Pennsylvania State Representative for the 149th district from 1997 to 2001
Daylin Leach	Democratic	2009 – 2020		Pennsylvania State Representative for the 149th district from 2003 to 2008
Amanda Cappelletti	Democratic	2020 – present		

== Recent election results ==
PA Senate election, 2020
Party	Candidate	Votes	%
Democratic	Amanda Cappelletti	104,273	65.8
Republican	Ellen Fisher	54,066	34.2
Total votes		158,339	100.0
Democratic hold			

Democratic primary, 2020
Party	Candidate	Votes	%
Democratic	Amanda Cappelletti	33,857	65.3%
Democratic	Daylin Leach (incumbent)	17,950	34.7%
Total votes		51,807	100.0%

PA Senate election, 2016
Party	Candidate	Votes	%
Democratic	Daylin Leach (incumbent)	88,827	64.0
Republican	Brian Gondek	50,010	36.0
Total votes		138,837	100.0
Democratic hold			

PA Senate election, 2012
Party	Candidate	Votes	%
Democratic	Daylin Leach (incumbent)	78,508	63.2
Republican	Charles Gehret	45,707	36.8
Total votes		124,215	100.0
Democratic hold			

PA Senate election, 2008
Party	Candidate	Votes	%
Democratic	Daylin Leach	76,350	61.5
Republican	Lance Rogers	47,873	38.5
Total votes		124,223	100.0
Democratic hold			
