= Amanda Cappelletti =

American politician

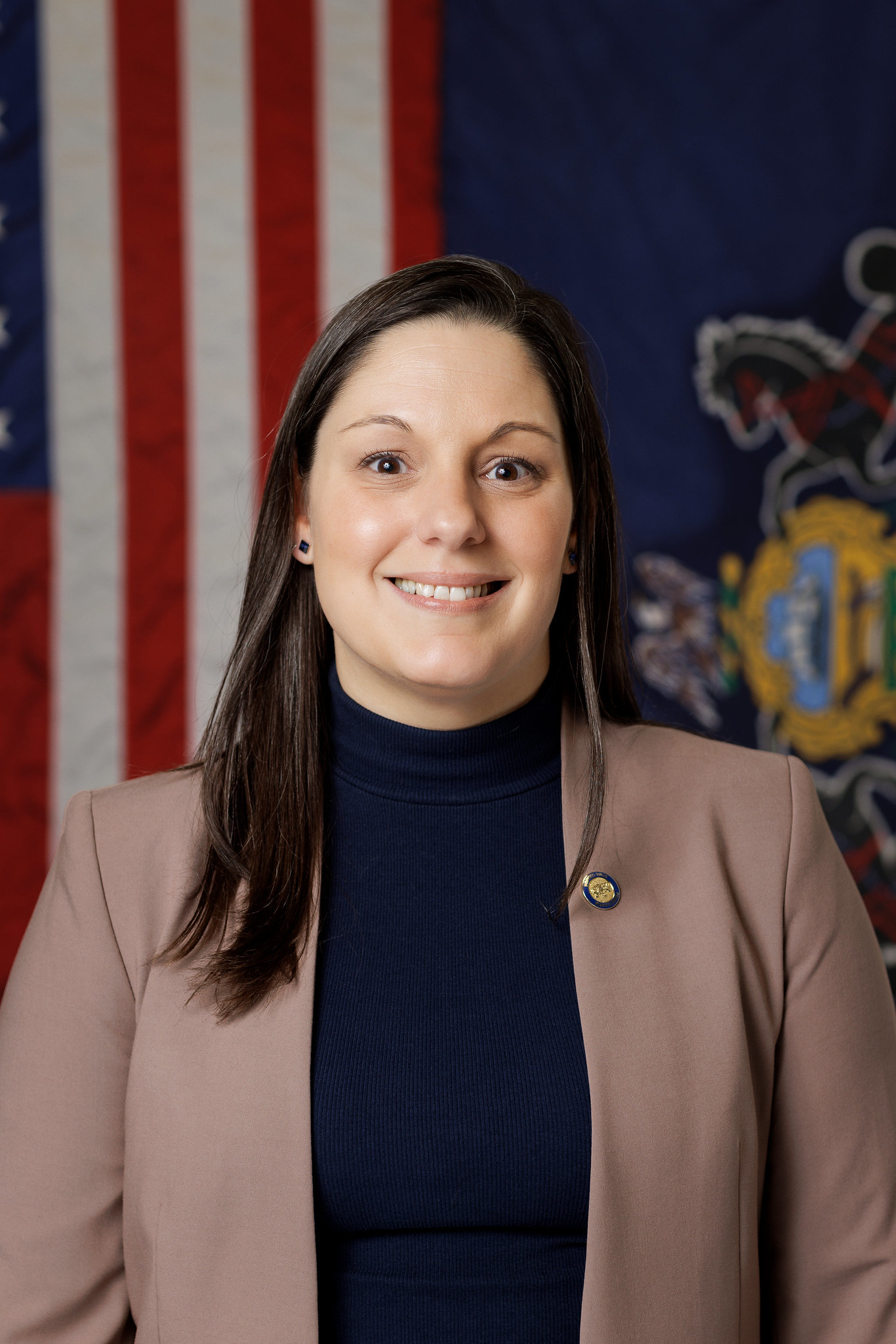
- Cappelletti in 2022

Member of the Pennsylvania Senate from the 17th district
- Incumbent
- Assumed office January 5, 2021
- Preceded by: Daylin Leach
- Constituency: Parts of Delaware and Montgomery Counties

Personal details
- Born: December 9, 1986 (age 39) Pottstown, Pennsylvania, U.S.
- Spouse: Gregory McQuiston
- Education: Chestnut Hill College (B.A.); Temple University (J.D.)
- Profession: Attorney

Amanda Cappelletti (born December 9, 1986) is an American politician and lawyer. She is a Democratic member of the Pennsylvania State Senate, representing the 17th District since 2021.

== Background ==
Cappelletti received her undergraduate degree from Chestnut Hill College, and went on to earn a J.D. and M.P.H. from Temple University. She worked as a legislative fellow at the Pennsylvania state affiliate of the American Civil Liberties Union before joining the Pennsylvania Department of Human Services, where she worked as a children's advocate and policy specialist. She later served as Director of Policy for Planned Parenthood's Pennsylvania affiliate.

== Political career ==
Cappelletti was elected to the East Norriton Board of Supervisors in 2017, becoming the board's vice-chair in 2019.

In November 2019, Cappelletti announced she would challenge three-term incumbent Daylin Leach in the Democratic primary for the 17th District of the Pennsylvania State Senate. Leach faced many calls to resign amid allegations of inappropriate behavior, and Cappelletti was endorsed by several officials including Governor Tom Wolf and U.S. Senators Bernie Sanders and Elizabeth Warren. Cappelletti defeated Leach in the June 2020 primary, receiving 65% of the vote. She went on to defeat her Republican opponent in the general election.

=== Committee assignments ===
For the 2025-2026 Session Cappelletti sits on the following committees in the State Senate:

- Judiciary (Minority Chair)
- Appropriations
- Health & Human Services
- Intergovernmental Operations
