= James Clark (Pennsylvania politician) =

American politician

James H. Clark

Member of the Pennsylvania House of Representatives from the 149th district
- In office January 3, 1989 – November 30, 1990
- Preceded by: Richard McClachey
- Succeeded by: Ellen A. Harley

Personal details
- Born: October 10, 1952 (age 73) New Hartford, Connecticut
- Party: Republican

James H. Clark (born October 10, 1952) is a former Republican member of the Pennsylvania House of Representatives.
