= Northeastern Political Science Association =

American professional society dedicated to political science

- Abbreviation: NPSA
- Type: Professional organization
- Legal status: 501(c)(4) non-profit
- Headquarters: Frostburg, Maryland
- Region served: Northeastern United States
- President: Lisa Parshall
- First Vice President & Program Chair: Eric Budd
- Second Vice President: Vanessa Ruget
- Publication: Polity
- Website: www.northeasternpsa.com

The Northeastern Political Science Association (abbreviated NPSA) is an American 501(c)(4) professional society dedicated to political science. Established in 1968, its name reflects its intended focus on the Northeastern United States, as well as its origins from regional associations in New Jersey, New York, Pennsylvania, and New England. Also established in 1968 was the association's official journal, Polity. Despite the regional beginnings of both the NPSA and Polity, however, both the association and its journal have always been open to submissions from outside the Northeast.
