= Senator Tillman (disambiguation) =

Benjamin Tillman (1847–1918) was a U.S. Senator from South Carolina from 1895 to 1918. Senator Tillman may also refer to:

- James D. Tillman (1841–1916), Tennessee State Senate
- Jerry W. Tillman (born 1940), North Carolina State Senate
- John N. Tillman (1859–1929), Arkansas State Senate

== See also ==
- Senator Tilghman (disambiguation)
