= Super statute =

The term super statute was applied in 2001 by William Eskridge and John Ferejohn to characterize an ordinary statute whose effort "to establish a new normative or institutional framework ... 'stick[s]' in the public culture" and has "a broad effect on the law". As a result, it has a "quasi-constitutional" significance that exceeds its formal status as a statute with interpretive significance for other legislation.

== Characteristics ==
Super statutes have a broad effect on law due to cultural influence, affecting even interpretation of constitutional provisions. The fabric of the society would be fundamentally changed by repeal. In practical political terms, super-statutes are embedded in the constitutional order and changing them carries political risks. When super-statutes conflict, the Supreme Court will trim the one less impaired by nonapplication.

Adrian Vermeule criticized the category boundaries as opaque.

== Other uses ==
According to Eskridge and Ferejohn, previous legal commentators had used the term "super-statute" for other purposes. Some writers have used the term to describe a constitution, e.g., A. E. Dick Howard, The Road from Runnymede: Magna Carta and the Constitutionalism in America (1968, pg.122) (stating that American lawyers in the eighteenth century viewed Magna Carta and the common law it was thought to embody "as a kind of superstatute, a constitution placing fundamental liberties beyond the reach of Parliament"). Other writers believe it's simply a big statute with no force outside its four corners, e.g., Bruce A. Ackerman, "Constitutional Politics/Constitutional Law", 99 Yale Law Journal 453, 522 (1989) ("Superstatutes do not seek to revise any of the deeper principles organizing our higher law; instead, they content themselves with changing one or more rules without challenging basic premises.").

== Examples ==
Eskridge and Ferejohn give these examples noting others exist.^{:1227}

- Judiciary Act of 1789
- Bank Bill of 1791
- Civil Rights Act of 1866
- Ku Klux Klan Act
- Interstate Commerce Act of 1887
- Sherman Antitrust Act
- Pure Food and Drug Act
- Federal Arbitration Act
- Norris–La Guardia Act
- Securities Act of 1933
- Securities Exchange Act of 1934
- Indian Reorganization Act
- National Labor Relations Act of 1935
- Fair Labor Standards Act of 1938
- Federal Food, Drug, and Cosmetic Act of 1938
- Endangered Species Act of 1973
- Pregnancy Discrimination Act
- Bankruptcy Reform Act of 1978
- Superfund
