= Pennsylvania House of Representatives, District 149 =

American legislative district

Pennsylvania's 149th State House of Representatives district
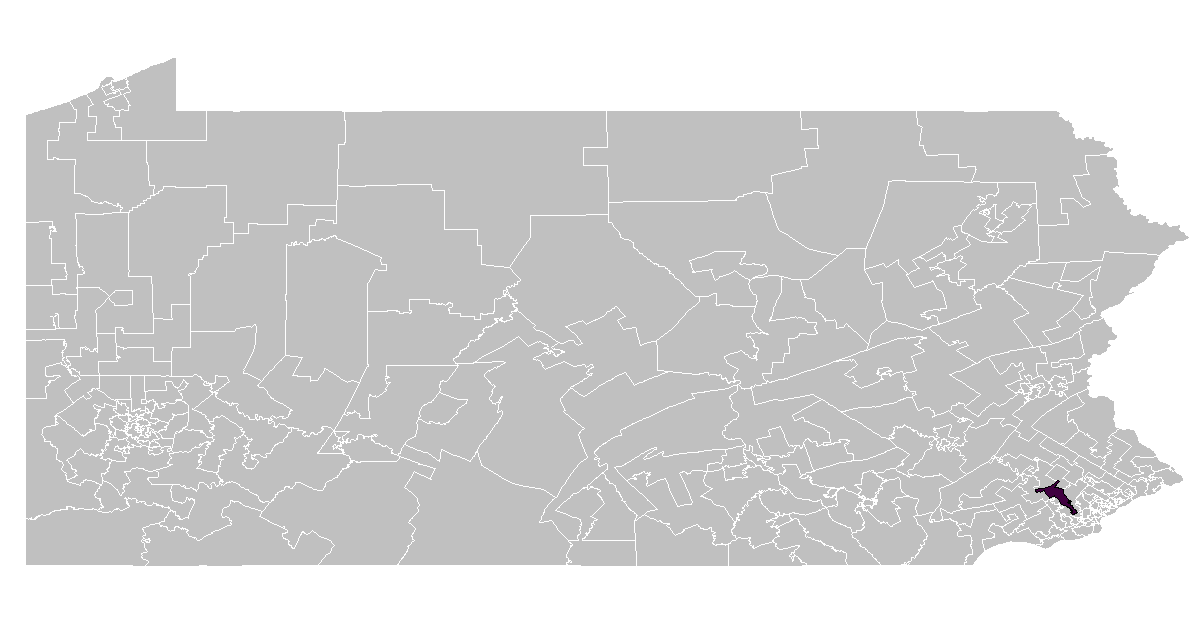
Representative
Tim Briggs; D–Upper Merion Township

The 149th Pennsylvania House of Representatives District is located in Montgomery County and includes the following areas:

- Bridgeport
- Lower Merion Township (PART)
  - Ward 05
  - Ward 06
  - Ward 07
  - Ward 10 [PART, Divisions 01 and 02]
  - Ward 11
  - Ward 14
- Upper Merion Township
- West Conshohocken
- West Norriton Township (PART)
  - District 02 [PART, Division 02]
  - District 04

== Representatives ==
Representative	Party	Years	District home	Note
Prior to 1969, seats were apportioned by county.
Richard A. McClachey, Jr.	Republican	1969 – 1988		
James Clark	Republican	1989 – 1990		
Ellen A. Harley	Republican	1991 – 1994		
Colleen Sheehan	Republican	1995 – 1996		
Constance H. Williams	Democrat	1997 – 2001		Resigned December 3, 2001 after election to the Pennsylvania State Senate
Wallis Brooks	Republican	2002		Elected February 12, 2002 to fill vacancy.
Daylin Leach	Democrat	2003 – 2008		Elected to seek Pennsylvania State Senate seat.
Tim Briggs	Democrat	2009 – present	Upper Merion Township	Incumbent
