= Universities at Shady Grove =

Partner campus of nine public universities in Maryland, United States

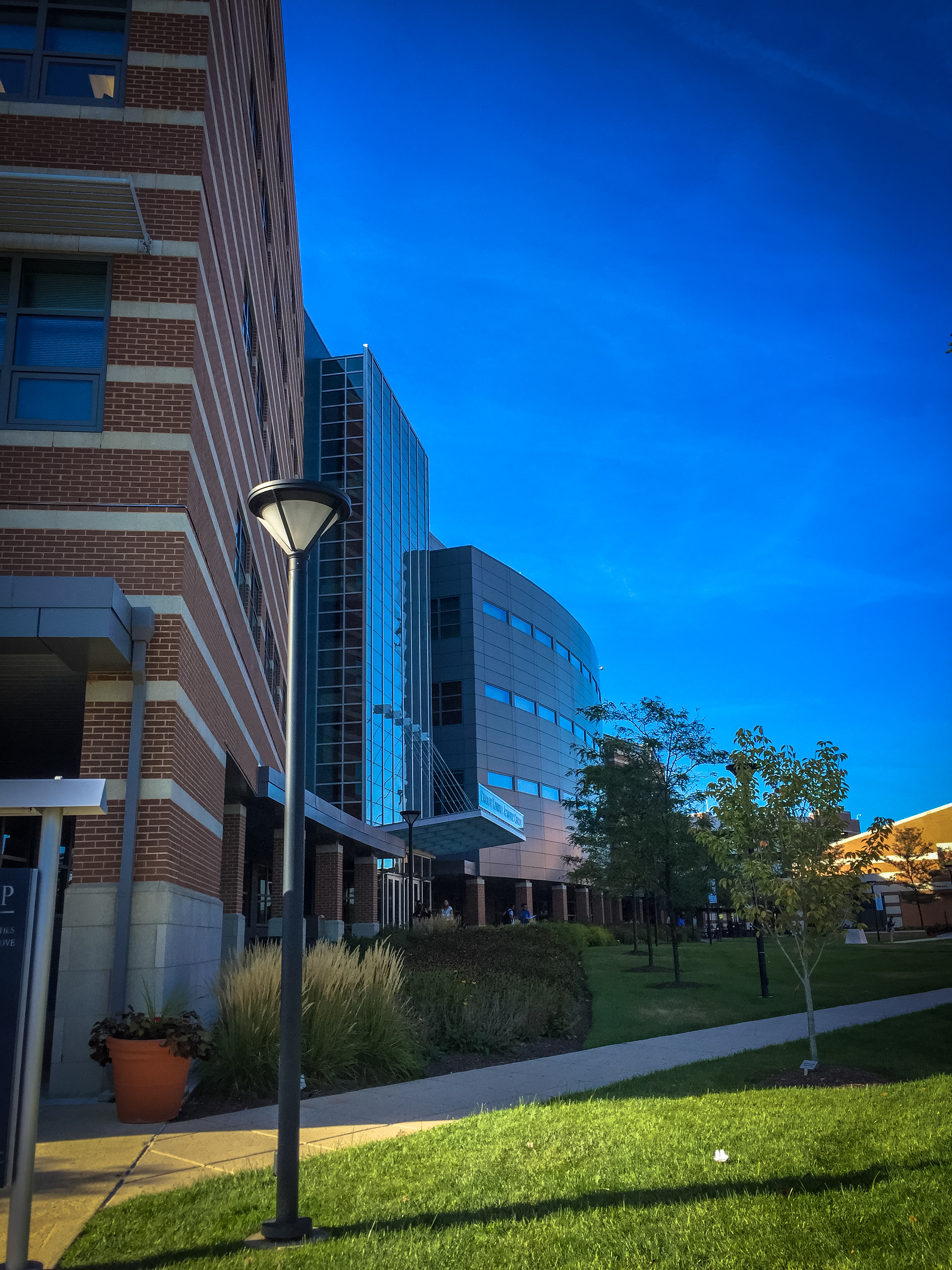
- University of Maryland Shady Grove
- Type: Public university
- Established: 2000
- Parent institution: University System of Maryland
- Executive Director: Anne Khademian
- Location: Rockville, Maryland, United States; 39°5′38.2″N 77°12′5.9″W
- Chair, Board of Advisors: Michael Knapp
- Chair, Governing Council: Joann Boughman
- Website: www.shadygrove.umd.edu

The Universities at Shady Grove (USG) is a multi-university higher education center of the University System of Maryland for mid-career working professionals and non-traditional students. Degrees taught by the cooperative are conferred by the individual universities as opposed to it being conferred in the name of the education center.

== History ==
It originally began in 1992 as part of the University of Maryland University College. In 2000, it reformed under its present name. Daytime, evening and weekend classes are offered at Shady Grove to students studying in 80 undergraduate, graduate, degree and certificate programs.

Established in 2000, The Universities at Shady Grove (USG) is a regional higher education center of the University System of Maryland that offers students access to undergraduate and graduate degree programs from nine universities on one campus in Rockville, Maryland.

There is no separate application for USG; prospective students seeking to enroll in a program at USG apply directly to the university offering their desired program. Students are taught by the same professors, take the same courses, and have the same curriculum as students enrolled in that program at their university's main campus. Students take their classes at USG, but earn their degree from the university offering their program.

There is an on-campus library, the Shannon and Michael Priddy Library.

== Academics ==
As a regional higher education center of the University System of Maryland, undergraduate and graduate degree programs are offered on the USG campus from nine Maryland universities:

- Bowie State University
  - Ed.D in Education
  - M.Ed in Education
- Salisbury University
  - B.S. in Exercise Science
  - M.S. in Applied Health Physiology
  - B.F.A. in Art, Graphic Design
- Towson University
  - B.S. in Early Childhood Education
  - B.S. in Elementary Education/Special Education
  - M.A.T. in Special Education
  - M.Ed. in Early Childhood Education
  - M.Ed. in Special Education
- University of Baltimore
  - B.S. in Health Systems Management
  - B.S. in Simulation and Game Design
  - M.A. in Integrated Design
  - M.P.A. in Public Administration
  - M.P.S. in Justice Leadership and Management
  - M.S. in Forensic Science - High Technology Crime
  - M.S. in Health Systems Management
  - Doctor of Public Administration
  - Graduate Certificate in Government Financial Management
- University of Maryland, Baltimore (UMB)
  - B.S. in nursing (RN-to-BSN)
  - B.S. in nursing (Traditional Option)
  - M.S. in Medical Cannabis Science and Therapeutics
  - M.S. in Pharmaceutical Sciences
  - Masters in Social Work
  - Doctor of Nursing Practice | Family Nurse Practitioner
- University of Maryland, Baltimore County (UMBC)
  - B.A. in History
  - B.A. in Political Science
  - B.A., B.S. in Psychology
  - B.A. in Social Work
  - B.S. in Computer Science
  - B.S. in Mechanical Engineering
  - B.S. in Translational Life Science Technology
  - M.P.S. in Biotechnology
  - M.S. in Cybersecurity
  - M.P.S. in Data Science
  - M.P.S. in I/O Psychology
- University of Maryland, College Park (UMD)
  - B.A. in Communication
  - B.A. in Criminology and Criminal Justice
  - B.S. in Accounting
  - B.S. in Biological Sciences
  - B.S. in Cyber-Physical Systems Engineering
  - B.S. in Information Science (BSIS)
  - B.S. in Management
  - B.S. in Marketing
  - B.S. in Public Health Science
  - M.Ed. in Human Development
  - M.Ed. in Math Education: Special Studies in Middle School Math
  - M.Ed. in Special Education/Severe Disabilities with a focus on Autism Spectrum Disorders for Teachers, Professionals, and Professional Staff
  - M.Ed. in Teacher Leadership: Special Studies in STEM Education
  - Master of Business Administration
  - Master of Information Management (MIM)
  - Master of Library and Information Science (MLIS)
  - Professional Master in Engineering
  - Graduate Certificate in Engineering (GCEN)
  - Post Baccalaureate Certificate in Global Health
- University of Maryland Eastern Shore
  - B.S. in Construction Management Technology
  - B.S. in Hospitality and Tourism Management
- University of Maryland Global Campus (UMGC)
  - B.A. in Communication Studies
  - B.S. in Accounting
  - B.S. in Business Administration
  - B.S. in Computer Networks and Cybersecurity
  - B.S. in Cybersecurity Management and Policy
  - B.S. in Digital Media and Web Technology
  - B.S. in Human Resource Management
  - B.S. in Information Systems Management
  - B.S. In Investigative Forensics
  - B.S. in Public Safety Administration
  - B.S. in Software Development and Security
  - B.T.P.S. in Biotechnology
  - B.T.P.S. in Laboratory Management
  - M.S. in Biotechnology
  - M.S. in Health Care Administration
  - M.S. in Information Technology
  - M.S. in Management
