= James P. Pfiffner =

American political scientist (born 1946)

- Born: 1946 (age 79–80); Stevens Point, Wisconsin, U.S.

Academic background
- Education: University of Wisconsin–Madison (BA, MA, PhD)

Academic work
- Discipline: Political science; public administration
- Sub-discipline: Government and presidency in the United States
- Institutions: George Mason University
- Website: pfiffner.gmu.edu

James Price Pfiffner (born 1946) is an American political scientist and professor at George Mason University. Pfiffner is a fellow of the National Academy of Public Administration and is known for his expertise in the United States federal government, presidency, and national security.

Born in Stevens Point, Wisconsin, in 1946, Pfiffner attended the University of Wisconsin–Stevens Point for two years before attending the University of Wisconsin–Madison from 1966 to 1968, graduating with a B.A. degree in political science. From 1969 to 1970, Pfiffner served in Vietnam and Cambodia with the 25th Infantry Division of the U.S. Army, earning an Army Commendation Medal with a "V" device. He returned to university in 1971 and received M.A. and Ph.D. degrees in political science in 1972 and 1975, respectively.

Pfiffner later worked as a faculty member of the University of California, Riverside, and California State University, Fullerton, before becoming an associate professor in George Mason University's Schar School of Policy and Government in 1984. In 2019, he gave a testimony to the Subcommittee on the Constitution, Civil Rights, and Civil Liberties of the U.S. House of Representatives regarding presidential pardon powers. Pfiffner became University Professor, emeritus, at George Mason University in 2020.

== Books ==
Only books for which academic or scholarly reviews could be found are listed. Publication details are as per Pfiffner's curriculum vitae.

- Pfiffner, James P.; Hess, Stephen (2021). Organizing the Presidency (4th ed.). Brookings Institution Press.
- Lightcap, Tracy; Pfiffner, James P., eds. (2014). Examining Torture. Palgrave Macmillan.
- Pfiffner, James P.; Davidson, Roger H., eds. (2013). Understanding the Presidency (7th ed.). Pearson-Longman.
- Pfiffner, James P. (2010). Torture as Public Policy. Paradigm Publishers.
- Pfiffner, James P. (2008). Power Play. Brookings Institution Press.
- Pfiffner, James P. (2004). The Character Factor. Texas A&M University Press.
- Pfiffner, James P.; Brook, Douglas A., eds. (2000). The Future of Merit. Woodrow Wilson Center Press & Johns Hopkins University Press.
- Pfiffner, James P. (1994). The Modern Presidency. St. Martin's Press.
- Pfiffner, James P.; Whicker, Marcia; Moore, Raymond, eds. (1993). The Presidency and the Persian Gulf War. Praeger Publishers.
- Pfiffner, James P. (1988). The Strategic Presidency. Dorsey Press.
- Pfiffner, James P., ed. (1986). The President and Economic Policy. ISHI Publications.
- Pfiffner, James P. (1979). The President, the Budget, and Congress. Westview Press.
