= Constance H. Williams =

American politician (born 1944)

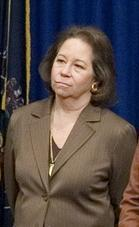

Member of the National Council on the Arts
- Incumbent
- Assumed office May 23, 2022
- Appointed by: Joe Biden

Member of the Pennsylvania Senate from the 17th district
- In office December 3, 2001 – January 3, 2009
- Preceded by: Richard A. Tilghman
- Succeeded by: Daylin Leach

Member of the Pennsylvania House of Representatives from the 149th district
- In office January 7, 1997 – December 3, 2001
- Preceded by: Colleen Sheehan
- Succeeded by: Wallis Brooks

Personal details
- Born: June 27, 1944 (age 82) Long Branch, New Jersey, U.S.
- Party: Democratic
- Spouse: Sankey V. Williams
- Relations: John B. Hess (brother); David T. Wilentz (grandfather); Robert Wilentz (uncle)
- Children: 2
- Education: Barnard College (BA); University of Pennsylvania (MBA)

Constance Hess Williams (born June 27, 1944) is an American politician who served as a Democratic member of the Pennsylvania State Senate for the 17th District, from 2001 to 2009. She previously represented the 149th district in the Pennsylvania House of Representatives from 1997 to 2001. On June 23, 2021, President Joe Biden nominated her for member of the National Council on the Arts, an advisory board to the chairperson of the National Endowment for the Arts.

== Early life and education ==
Williams was born in Long Branch, New Jersey, to Leon Hess and Norma Wilentz. Her father was the founder of the Hess Corporation and the owner of the New York Jets; her mother was the daughter of David T. Wilentz, who served as New Jersey Attorney General (1934–1944) and successfully prosecuted Bruno Hauptmann in the Lindbergh kidnapping trial, and the niece of Robert Wilentz, who served as Chief Justice of the New Jersey Supreme Court (1979–1996). The oldest of three children, she is the sister of John B. Hess, the former chair and current CEO of Hess Corporation. She graduated from Rutgers Preparatory School in 1962, and then studied at Barnard College, where she received a Bachelor of Arts degree in English in 1966.

Williams received a Master of Business Administration degree from the Wharton School of Business in 1980.

== Career ==
She worked as a small business consultant and a staffer for Congresswoman Marjorie Margolies. She also became active in local politics, serving as chairwoman of the Democratic committee of Lower Merion and Narberth.

=== State representative ===
In her first run for public office, Williams successfully ran for the Pennsylvania House of Representatives from the 149th District. The district covered parts of Montgomery County, including part of Lower Merion, Upper Merion Township, and West Conshohocken. She had decided to run for office after her daughters graduated from high school. In the Democratic primary, Williams defeated Angelo Faragalli, a former Republican who previously ran for the seat in 1994. In the general election, she faced freshman Republican incumbent Colleen Sheehan, whose opposition to abortion and support of school vouchers were seen as too conservative for the district. Williams narrowly defeated Sheehan in November by a margin of 506 votes, becoming the first Democrat to ever represent the district.

During her tenure in the House, Williams founded and co-chaired the Children's Caucus, and introduced legislation to give businesses tax credits for donating services or equipment to libraries. She also advocated for increased education spending, and opposed gun control legislation that was written by the National Rifle Association.

In 1998, Williams was re-elected to a second term after defeating Mary Wright, a former Lower Merion school board member, by a margin of 58%–42%. During the 2000 presidential primaries, she served as co-chair of U.S. Senator Bill Bradley's campaign in Pennsylvania. In 2000, she defeated Republican Lynne Lechter for a third term, receiving 62% of the vote.

=== State senator ===
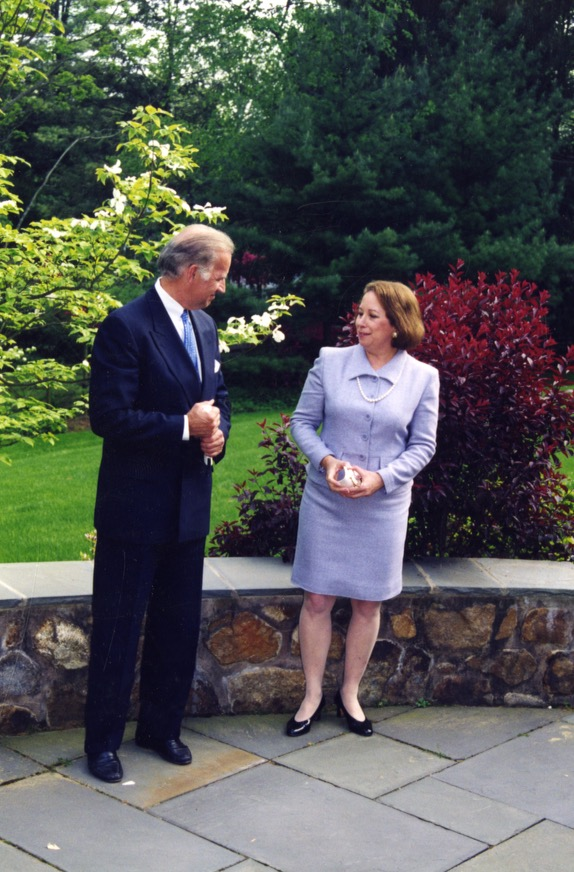
Williams with then Senator Joe Biden in 2002

In 2001, longtime Republican incumbent Richard Tilghman resigned from the Pennsylvania State Senate, where he had represented the 17th District for thirty-two years. The district, covering parts of Montgomery and Delaware Counties, is located in the Philadelphia Main Line. Williams subsequently ran in the special election to fill the remainder of Tilghman's term, facing fellow State Representative Lita Indzel Cohen. During the campaign, Williams ran on her moderate reputation and bipartisan record; she even received several Republican endorsements. She eventually defeated Cohen by a margin of 52%–48%.

Williams was sworn in on December 3, 2001. In 2004, she won re-election to a full term after defeating Republican Ted Barry, a Montgomery County assistant district attorney, by 64%–35%. She became known for her work on behalf of children, families, and the environment, and authored a law that allows women to publicly breastfeed their children. During her tenure in the Senate, she served as Senate Democratic Caucus administrator, ranking member of Communications and Technology Committee, co-chair of the Senate Life Sciences and Biotechnology Caucus, and a member of the Governor's Advisory Committee on Minority and Women Business Opportunities.

Williams announced that she would not be a candidate for re-election in 2008. In 2010, Politics Magazine named her one of the most influential Democrats in Pennsylvania, noting the value of receiving her endorsement.

== Philanthropy and community engagement ==
With a focus on education, the arts, and economic development across regional organizations, Williams is widely known for her community involvement. As chair of the board of the Philadelphia Museum of Art, she played a key role in developing a new institutional strategic plan and was a guiding force in restoring the Rodin Museum in 2012 and 2013. Her leadership resulted in the completion of the SF Art Handling Facility, the renovation and reinstallation of the galleries dedicated to South Asian art and the retaining of architect Frank Gehry to undertake the expansion and renovation of the museum's main building. She is vice-president and director of the Hess Foundation, board member and former chair of Steppingstones Scholars, and board member of the National Museum of American Jewish History.

== Personal life ==
She is married to Sankey V. Williams, who is the Sol Katz Professor of Medicine at the University of Pennsylvania and the chief of general internal medicine at the university hospital; the couple has two daughters.

Pennsylvania State Senate
Preceded by Richard Tilghman	Member of the Pennsylvania Senate for the 17th District; 2001–2009	Succeeded by Daylin Leach
Pennsylvania House of Representatives
Preceded by Colleen Sheehan	Member of the Pennsylvania House of Representatives for the 149th District; 1997–2001	Succeeded by Wallis Brooks
