= Anne Khademian =

American academic administrator and political scientist

- Education: Michigan State University; Washington University in St. Louis
- Scientific career
- Fields: Political science, public administration
- Workplaces: University of Wisconsin–Madison; Virginia Tech; Universities at Shady Grove

Anne Khademian is an American academic administrator and political scientist serving as the executive director of the Universities at Shady Grove and associate vice chancellor for academic affairs for the University System of Maryland since 2020. She has held faculty and leadership positions at Virginia Tech and the University of Wisconsin–Madison. She specializes in public administration, organizational change, and leadership.

== Education ==
Khademian earned a B.A. in political science and a M.P.A. from Michigan State University. She was a member of the university's track and Cross country running teams. She was also inducted into their Athletic Hall of Fame in 2016. She later pursued a Ph.D. in political science and government at Washington University in St. Louis.

== Career ==
Khademian began her academic career as an assistant professor in the department of political science and the Robert M. La Follette School of Public Affairs at the University of Wisconsin–Madison in 1990. She was promoted to associate professor in 1996. From 1989 to 1990, she was a research fellow in governmental studies at the Brookings Institution.

From 1997 to 2000, Khademian served as a visiting associate professor in the department of political science and Ford School of Public Policy at the University of Michigan. She was also a visiting senior fellow in the Robert A. Fox Leadership Program at the University of Pennsylvania College of Arts & Sciences from 2000 to 2002.

Khademian joined Virginia Tech in 2003 as a visiting associate professor at the Center for Public Administration and Policy, Alexandria Center. Khademian was elected a fellow of the National Academy of Public Administration in 2009. In 2011, she became the director of the Virginia Tech School of Public and International Affairs (SPIA), a role she held until 2018. During her tenure, she oversaw the introduction of new academic degrees and programs, increased enrollment, faculty expansion, and the development of global partnerships and community outreach initiatives. In 2018, Khademian was appointed a presidential fellow at Virginia Tech, focusing on initiatives to support organizational innovation and growth across the university's campuses.

In October 2020, Khademian became the executive director of the Universities at Shady Grove (USG), a regional higher education center of the University System of Maryland (USM). Concurrently, she was appointed associate vice chancellor for academic affairs at USM. At USG, she manages a multi-university collaboration offering undergraduate and graduate programs on a single campus in Rockville, Maryland.

In addition to her academic leadership roles, Khademian serves as chair of the Board of Directors of the Montgomery County Chamber of Commerce and as a board member of the Montgomery County Economic Development Corporation, Smart City Works, and the American Red Cross National Capital Region.

In 2023, Khademian was honored as a "Women Who Inspire" Honoree by Bethesda Magazine as well as a “Heroines of Washington” Finalist by the March of Dimes.

== Research and scholarship ==
Khademian's research focuses on public policy with an emphasis on improving the leadership and organization of policy networks based around homeland security and financial regulation.

=== Published works ===
- ''The SEC and Capital Market Regulation: The Politics of Expertise'' (University of Pittsburgh Press, 1992).
- ''Checking on Banks: Autonomy and Accountability in Three Federal Agencies'' (Brookings Institution Press, 1996).
- ''Working with Culture: The Way the Job Gets Done in Public Programs'' (CQ Press, 2002).

== Personal life ==
Khademian resides in Montgomery County, Maryland, where she participates in several community and leadership initiatives, including serving on the boards of the Montgomery County Chamber of Commerce, Montgomery County Economic Development Corporation, and the American Red Cross National Capital Region.

In 2016, she was inducted into the Michigan State University Athletic Hall of Fame for Cross Country and Track and Field from 1979–82, 84.
