= André Freire =

Portuguese political scientist

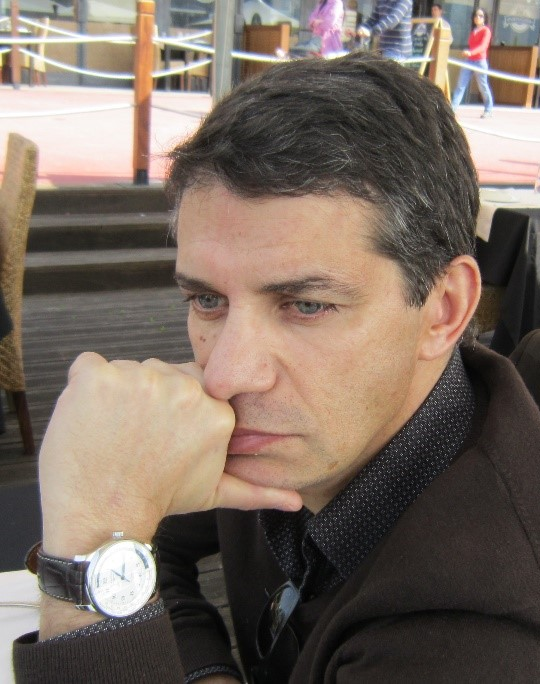
- Freire in 2012
- Born: 25 April 1961
- Died: 30 October 2024 (aged 63)
- Education: ISCTE-IUL
- Occupation: Academic
- Employer(s): ISCTE-IUL, CIES-IUL

André Freire (25 April 1961 – 30 October 2024) was a Portuguese academic who was Full Professor of Political Science at ISCTE-IUL, Lisbon University Institute, and a senior researcher at CIES-IUL.

== Life and career ==
Freire was a Full Professor of Political Science at ISCTE-IUL, Lisbon University Institute., and a senior researcher at CIES-IUL, where he was also the Director of the Observatory for Democracy and Political Representation. He conducted research in the fields of Political Behaviour and Political Attitudes (both on voters and political representatives), Political Representation, Political Elites and Political Institutions, both at the national and international levels. He lectured about these topics and also has several publications in different languages in books, book chapters and articles in academic periodicals. Freire received several awards and scholarships related to his research.

Moreover, Freire collaborated with several publications in the Portuguese press, on a regular basis with the Público (2006 to 2016) and the Jornal de Letras (2017 to 2021) newspapers, having also been a political commentator on televisions (RTP, TVI and SIC), radios (Antena 1, TSF, etc.) and other newspapers (DN, Expresso, Jornal I, Económico, Jornal de Negócios, etc.).

Civically, he was a member of the National Union of Higher Education (SNESup) and supported several manifestos and petitions, namely defending the collaboration among the Portuguese left-wing parties to govern, since the 2009 Portuguese legislative elections.

He participated in the blog Ladrões de Bicicletas (in English: «Bicycle Thieves»), from 2007 to 2010, and was a co-creator of the blog A Vaca Voadora (in English: «The Flying Cow»), where he participated since 2016 until his death.

Freire died from complications of surgery on 30 October 2024, at the age of 63.

== Selected publications ==
=== Books (author) ===
Freire, André (2006), Esquerda e Direita na Política Europeia. Portugal, Espanha e Grécia em Perspectiva Comparada, Lisboa, Imprensa de Ciências Sociais; English translation: Left and Right in European Politics. Portugal, Spain and Greece in Comparative Perspective (2006)

March, Luke, and Freire, André (2012), A Esquerda Radical em Portugal e na Europa: Marxismo, Mainstream ou Marginalidade?, Porto, Quid Novi; English translation: The Radical Left in Portugal and Europe: Marxism, Mainstream or Marginality? (2012)

Freire, André (2017), Para lá da «Geringonça»: O Governo de Esquerdas em Portugal e na Europa, Lisboa, Contraponto; English translation: Beyond the «Contraption»: The Leftist Government in Portugal and Europe (2017)

Freire, André (2022), Left and Right. Meaning and Correlates in Long Consolidated and New Democracies, Moldova: Eliva Press.

=== Books (editor) ===
Freire, André, Marina Costa Lobo & Pedro Magalhães (editors) (2007), Portugal at the Polls. The 2002 Legislative Elections, Lanham, MD: Lexington.

Freire, André (editor) (2011), Eleições e Sistemas Eleitorais no século XX Português: Um Balanço Histórico e Comparativo, Lisboa, Colibri; English translation: Elections and Electoral Systems on the Portuguese XX century: An Historical and Comparative balance (2011)

Freire, André (editor) (2012), O Sistema Político Português, séculos XIX-XXI: Continuidades e Ruturas, Coimbra, Almedina; English translation: The Portuguese Political System, centuries XIX-XXI: Continuities and Ruptures (2012)

Freire, André, Mélany Barragan, Xavier Coler, Marco Lisi & Emmanouil Tsatsanis (editors) (2020), Political representation in Southern Europe and Latin America: Before and After the Great Recession and the Commodity Crisis, Edited volume for Routledge book series “Routledge Research on Social and Political Elites”.

Lisi, Marco, André Freire & Emmanouil Tsatsanis (editors) (2020), Political Representation and Citizenship in Portugal: from Crisis to Renewal?, Lexington Books – Rowman & Littlefield.
