= Political Research Quarterly =

- Discipline: Political science
- Language: English
- Edited by: Charles Anthony Smith, Andrew Flores, Jennifer Garcia, Stephen Andrew Nuno, Davin Phoenix, Julia Jordan-Zachary, Heather Smith-Cannoy, Christopher Stout, Jami Taylor, Angelia Wilson, Wendy Wong, Jacob Sutherland

Publication details
- Former name: Western Political Quarterly
- History: 1948-present
- Publisher: SAGE Publications on behalf of the University of Utah (United States)
- Frequency: Quarterly
- Impact factor: 2.531 (2021)

Standard abbreviations
- ISO 4: Political Res. Q.

Indexing
- ISSN: 1065-9129 (print); 1938-274X (web)
- LCCN: 93657077
- OCLC no.: 638770729

Links
- Journal homepage; Online access; Online archive

Political Research Quarterly is a quarterly peer-reviewed academic journal that covers the field of political science. The editor-in-chief is Charles Anthony Smith (University of California, Irvine); with associate editors: Andrew Flores (American University), Jennifer Garcia (Oberlin College), Stephen Andrew Nuno (Northern Arizona University), Davin Phoenix (University of California, Irvine), Julia Jordan-Zachary (Wake Forest University), Heather Smith-Cannoy (Arizona State University), Christopher Stout (Oregon State University), Jami Taylor (University of Toledo), Angelia Wilson (University of Manchester), and Wendy Wong (University of British Columbia); and managing editor: Jacob Sutherland (University of California, Irvine).

The journal was established in 1948 and is published by SAGE Publications on behalf of the University of Utah. It is the official journal of the Western Political Science Association.

== History ==
Originally named the Western Political Quarterly, it served as the official journal of the Western Political Science Association since it was first published by the University of Utah in March, 1948. The relationship between the association and the journal was formalized in 1971. The journal was renamed Political Research Quarterly in 1992.

== Abstracting and indexing ==
The journal is abstracted and indexed in Scopus and the Social Sciences Citation Index. According to the Journal Citation Reports, the journal has a 2021 impact factor of 2.531, ranking it 67th out of 187 journals in the category "Political Science".

== See also ==
- List of political science journals
