= Journal of Management Education =

- Discipline: Management
- Language: English
- Edited by: Jeanie M. Forray and Kathy Lund Dean

Publication details
- Former names: The Teaching of Organizational Behavior, Exchange: The Organizational Behavior Teaching Journal, Organizational Behavior Teaching Review
- History: 1975-present
- Publisher: SAGE Publications
- Frequency: Bimonthly

Standard abbreviations
- ISO 4: J. Manag. Educ.

Indexing
- CODEN: JMEUFW
- ISSN: 1052-5629 (print); 1552-6658 (web)
- LCCN: 91640721
- OCLC no.: 610425178

Links
- Journal homepage; Online access; Online archive

The Journal of Management Education is a bimonthly peer-reviewed academic journal that covers the teaching and learning of management. The editors-in-chief are Jeanie M. Forray (Western New England University) and Kathy Lund Dean (Gustavus Adolphus College). It was established in 1975 and is published by SAGE Publications in association with the Management & Organizational Behavior Teaching Society.

== Abstracting and indexing ==
The journal is abstracted and indexed in:

- Academic Search
- Emerald Management Reviews
- FRANCIS
- PsycINFO
