= Paul C. Light =

American political scientist

- Awards: Herbert Simon Award (APSA), Louis Brownlow Book Award, D. B. Hardeman Prize

Academic background
- Education: University of Michigan (PhD)

Academic work
- Discipline: Political science
- Institutions: New York University

Paul C. Light is an American political scientist and Professor Emeritus of Public Service at New York University. He is also a Nonresident Senior Fellow at Brookings Institution, known for his works on government reform, public service, veterans policy, social security, and social innovation. He is a winner of the Herbert Simon Award (APSA) for his book A Government Ill Executed: The Decline of the Federal Service and How to Reverse It.

== Publications ==
- Government by Investigation: Congress, the President and the Search for Answers, 1945-2012, Brookings Institution Press/Governance Institute, 2014
- The Search for Social Entrepreneurship, Brookings Institution, 2008
- A Government Ill Executed: The Decline of the Federal Service and How to Reverse It, Harvard University Press, 2008,
- Sustaining Nonprofit Performance: The Case for Capacity Building and the Evidence to Support It, Brookings Institution, 2004
- Government’s Greatest Achievements: From Civil Rights to Homeland Security, Brookings Institution, 2002
- Pathways to Nonprofit Excellence, Brookings Institution, 2002
- Making Nonprofits Work: A Report on the Tides of Nonprofit Management Reform, Brookings Institution/Aspen Institute, 2000
- The New Public Service, Brookings Institution, 1999
- The True Size of Government, Brookings Institution, 1999
- The Tides of Reform: Making Government Work, 1945-1994, Yale University Press, 1997
- Thickening Government: Federal Hierarchy and the Diffusion of Accountability, Brookings Institution-Governance Institute, 1995
- Monitoring Government: Inspectors General and the Search for Accountability, Brookings Institution/Governance Institute, 1993
- Vice Presidential Power: Advice and Influence in the White House, Johns Hopkins University Press, 1983
- The President's Agenda: Domestic Policy Choice from Kennedy to Carter, Baltimore, Johns Hopkins University Press, 1982; second edition published as The President's Agenda: Domestic Policy Choice from Kennedy to Reagan, 1992; third edition published as The President’s Agenda: Domestic Policy Choice from Kennedy to Clinton, 1998
