= Ellen Harley =

American politician

Ellen A. Harley

Member of the Pennsylvania House of Representatives from the 149th district
- In office January 1, 1991 – November 30, 1994
- Preceded by: James Clark
- Succeeded by: Colleen Sheehan

Personal details
- Born: December 31, 1946 (age 79) Nashville, Tennessee, United States
- Party: Republican
- Education: Monmouth University

Ellen A. Harley (born December 31, 1946) is a former Republican member of the Pennsylvania House of Representatives.

== Background ==
Born in Nashville, Tennessee on December 31, 1946, Harley earned her Bachelor of Arts degree in English from Monmouth College (New Jersey) and her Master of Arts in city and regional planning from The University of Pennsylvania. A city and regional planner, she was elected as a Republican to the Pennsylvania House of Representatives for the 1991 and 1993 terms.

Appointed to the Pennsylvania Public Television Network Commission for the 1991–1992 term, she was subsequently appointed to the Pennsylvania Council on the Arts for the 1993–1994 term.

She opted not to stand as a candidate for reelection to the House in 1994, and instead ran an unsuccessful campaign for the United States Congress.
