= Publius (journal) =

Publius: The Journal of Federalism
- Discipline: Federalism
- Language: English
- Edited by: Paul Nolette, Philip Rocco

Publication details
- History: 1971–present
- Publisher: Oxford University Press on behalf of CSF: Publius, Inc. (United States)
- Frequency: Quarterly
- Impact factor: 2.2 (2023)

Standard abbreviations
- ISO 4: Publius

Indexing
- ISSN: 0048-5950 (print); 1747-7107 (web)
- LCCN: 72621452
- JSTOR: 00485950
- OCLC no.: 60628093

Links
- Journal homepage; Online access; Online archive

Publius: The Journal of Federalism is a quarterly social science journal published by Oxford University Press on behalf of CSF: Publius, Inc., a non-profit affiliate of the Center for the Study of Federalism. It covers the history, theory, structures, and practice of federalism and the application of federal principles to political and social issues. It was established in 1971 by Daniel Elazar (Temple University). Its title is in honor of Alexander Hamilton, John Jay, and James Madison, who used the pen-name "Publius" in 1787–1788 when they published the papers that became known as The Federalist. The journal is sponsored by the Federalism and Intergovernmental Relations Section of the American Political Science Association.

The editors of the journal have been Daniel J. Elazar (1971–1999), John Kincaid (1981–2006), Carol S. Weissert (2006–2014), John Dinan (2014–2023), and the team of Paul Nolette and Philip Rocco (2024–present).

== Abstracting and indexing ==
According to the Journal Citation Reports, the journal has a 2023 impact factor of 2.2, ranking it 82nd out of 317 journals in the category “Political Science”. It is covered by indexing and abstracting services including the Social Sciences Citation Index, Historical Abstracts, and PAIS International.

== See also ==
- List of political science journals
