= Russell Hardin =

American political scientist (1940–2017)

- Born: 1940
- Died: February 24, 2017 (aged 76–77)

Academic background
- Education: University of Texas (BA); Oxford University (BA); Massachusetts Institute of Technology (PhD)

Academic work
- Institutions: University of Pennsylvania; University of Maryland; University of Chicago; Stanford University; New York University

Russell Hardin (1940 – 24 February 2017) was an American political scientist. He is known for his works on collective action and trust. He earned his PhD at the Massachusetts Institute of Technology in 1971. At the time of his death, he was a professor in the New York University Department of Politics. In 1990, he was elected fellow of the American Academy of Arts and Sciences.

== Selected bibliography ==
=== Books ===
- Hardin, Russell (2013). Indeterminacy and society. Princeton University Press.
- Hardin, Russell (2009). How do you know? The economics of ordinary knowledge. Princeton University Press. ISBN 978-0-691-13755-1.
- Hardin, Russell (2006). Trust. Polity. ISBN 0-7456-2465-0.
- Hardin, Russell (2002). Trust and trustworthiness. Russell Sage Foundation. ISBN 9780871543417.
- Hardin, Russell (1999). Liberalism, constitutionalism, and democracy. Oxford University Press. ISBN 9780191599415.
- Hardin, Russell (1995). One for all: The logic of group conflict. Princeton University Press. ISBN 1-4008-0345-4.
- Hardin, Russell (1988). Morality within the limits of reason. University of Chicago Press. ISBN 0-226-31618-1.
- Hardin, Russell (1982). Collective action. RFF Press.

=== Journal articles ===
- Hardin, Russell (December 1993). "The street-level epistemology of trust". Politics & Society. 21 (4): 505–529.
