= Bruce E. Cain =

American political scientist (born 1948)

Bruce E. Cain (born November 28, 1948) is a professor of political science at Stanford University and director of the Bill Lane Center for the American West. Cain's fields of interest include American politics, political regulation, democratic theory, and state and local government. He has published works on elections, legislative representation, California politics, redistricting, and political regulation.

Cain also makes appearances as a political expert for KGO-TV in the San Francisco Bay Area.

== Education ==
Cain graduated summa cum laude from Bowdoin College in 1970 and studied as a Rhodes Scholar at Trinity College, Oxford. In 1976, he received his Ph.D. in political science from Harvard University.

== Career ==
Upon completion of his PhD, Cain began his academic career at the California Institute of Technology (Caltech) in 1976. His work as an assistant and associate professor focused on comparisons of British and American governance systems, representation and redistricting. Additionally, during his 14 years at Caltech, Cain held numerous leadership roles on academic administration committees, ranging from admissions and academic standards to the faculty board.

In 1981, while on leave from the university, Cain served as a special consultant to the California Assembly Special Committee on Reapportionment. Working with NASA's Jet Propulsion Laboratory, Cain's work on California's redistricting was the first effort to employ satellite maps and computer programming in the apportionment process prior to the creation of Geographic Information Systems (GIS). His work in the early 1980s ultimately led to the creation of the statewide database. This public data enterprise is now housed under the Berkeley School of Law, and continues to be the primary warehouse for redistricting information and data in California.

In 1989, Cain joined the faculty of what is now named The Charles and Louise Travers Department of Political Science at University of California at Berkeley. From 1995 to 2006, Cain was appointed the Robson Professor of Political Science, and served as the Heller Professor of Political Science from 2007 to 2012.

Under the direction of Nelson W. Polsby, Cain served as the associate director of the Institute of Governmental Studies (IGS) from 1989 to 1999 and as its director from 1999 to 2007. The IGS is an interdisciplinary organized research unit (ORU) at UC Berkeley. Founded in 1919, IGS and its affiliated centers spearhead and promote research, programs, seminars and colloquia, training, educational activities, and public service in the fields of politics and public policy, with a strong focus on national and California politics.

Between September 2005 - June 2012, Cain served as the executive director of the University of California's Washington Center, “a multi-campus residential, instructional and research center that provides students and faculty from the University of California with opportunities to research, work, study and live within rich cultural, political and international heritage of our capital city.” In addition to his administrative duties as director, Professor Cain taught undergraduate seminars on the Congress, political reform and research methodology.

== Contributions to political science ==
Cain was one of early contributors to the now burgeoning field of election law and political regulation. Since Baker v Carr (1962), the courts have been drawn into deciding disputes over political reforms related to redistricting, term limits, party primaries, campaign finance, direct democracy and election administration. Many of Cain's empirical studies show that political reforms rarely achieve all that they promise because of adaptive behavior by those being regulated and because there is typically more consensus about the problems than the solutions. His work has demonstrated that terms limits, for instance, have not reduced partisanship or increased the quality of state legislatures, that redistricting reform has been frustrated by the inability to define what fairness is, and that campaign finance regulation is hindered by being necessarily ex post facto. His most recent studies have focused on devising a more realistic and coherent theory of political reform.

== Awards and board memberships ==
Throughout his career, Cain has been recognized for not only his distinguished research, but also for his commitment to mentoring both undergraduate and graduate students. In 1988, he was a co-winner of the Richard F. Fenno Prize for the best legislative studies book along with J. A. Ferejohn and M. Fiorina. In 1988, he received the Associated Students of the California Institute of Technology Award for Excellence in Teaching. In 2000, Stanford University awarded him the Zale Award for Outstanding Achievement in Policy Research and Public Service. In 2003, UC Berkeley recognized Professor Cain for Distinguished Mentoring of Undergraduates. Also in 2003, the American Political Science Association and Pi Sigma Alpha, the National Political Science Honor Society, honored Cain for outstanding teaching in political science.

He is a member of the American Political Science Association, and serves on the editorial boards of Election Law Journal and American Politics Research. Cain has been a member of the American Academy of Arts and Sciences since 2000. During AY 2012–13, Cain will serve as a Straus Fellow at New York University's Straus Institute for the Advanced Study of Law and Justice.

== Media ==
Beginning in 1984, Cain has been an election commentator for every race in California both on the radio and on television. He served as a consultant to the Los Angeles Times from 1986–88 and was the political analyst on Mornings on Two, KTVU from 1998 to 2006. He is a member of the American Federation of Television and Radio Artists and currently appears as a regular political analyst for KGO-TV.

== Government and political consulting ==
He served as a polling consultant for state and senate races to Fairbank, Canapary and Maulin from 1985 to 1986. Cain's expertise has led him to work as a redistricting consultant to several government agencies, including: the Los Angeles City Council (1986), Los Angeles County (1991), the Oakland City Council (1993), the City of San Diego (2001), the City and County of San Francisco (2002), the Attorney General of Maryland (2011), the Attorney General of Massachusetts (1987–88), and the U.S. Justice Department (1989). He served as the special master to the three-judge panel overseeing the Arizona State Legislative Redistricting (2002).

== Selected published works ==
- The Reapportionment Puzzle (1984)
- The Personal Vote (1987) (written with John Ferejohn and Morris Fiorina)
- Congressional Redistricting (1991) (with David Butler)
