= Colleen Sheehan =

American politician (born 1956)

Colleen A. Sheehan

Member of the Pennsylvania House of Representatives from the 149th district
- In office January 3, 1995 – November 30, 1996
- Preceded by: Ellen Harley
- Succeeded by: Constance H. Williams

Personal details
- Born: January 7, 1956 (age 70) Plattsburgh, New York, United States
- Party: Republican
- Spouse: John A. Doody III
- Children: John A. Doody IV; Brenda M. Hafera
- Education: Ph.D Claremont Graduate School; M.A. Claremont Graduate School; B.A. Eisenhower College
- Occupation: University Professor

Colleen Ann Sheehan (born January 7, 1956) is a former Republican member of the Pennsylvania House of Representatives. A former, longtime member of the Villanova University faculty, she is currently a professor of politics and ethics in the Arizona State University's School of Civic and Economic Thought and Leadership (SCETL).

An education advocate, she fought for increased funding for K-12 education, saying, "There is no more important responsibility of our government here in Pennsylvania than the education of our children.

== Formative years ==
Born in Plattsburgh, New York on January 7, 1956, Sheehan graduated from Willsboro Central School in 1973, earned her Bachelor of Arts degree from Eisenhower College in Seneca Falls, New York in 1977, her Master of Arts degree from the Claremont Graduate School (now Claremont Graduate University) in Claremont, California in 1979, and her Doctor of Philosophy degree from that same institution in 1986.

== Academic career ==
Sheehan was a member of the faculty of Villanova University in Villanova, Pennsylvania from September 1986 through November 2020. While there, she was the director of the Matthew J. Ryan Center for the Study of Free Institutions and the Public Good. In 2006, she was a visiting associate professor at Princeton University in Princeton, New Jersey. Since March 2020, she has served as a professor of politics and ethics in the School of Civic and Economic Thought and Leadership at Arizona State University in Tempe, Arizona.

== Public service and political career ==
A member of the Republican Party, she was elected to the Pennsylvania House of Representatives, and served for a two-year term, beginning in 1995. In favor of using tax dollars to fund charter and private schools as well as public schools, she also supported restrictions on abortion, except in cases of rape or incest. In January 1995, she voted in favor of "a tough Republican plan" to "reduce benefits to many people on welfare," according to The Philadelphia Inquirer, that was designed to "deny automatic cash grant increases for welfare mothers who [had] more babies," and "would eliminate general assistance to able-bodied people ages 18 to 25." In October of that same year, she voted against the House's approval of an eighteen percent pay raise for members of the Pennsylvania House and Senate, a successful bill that made "Pennsylvania public servants among the best paid in the nation" at that time.

Unsuccessful in her reelection bid for the House, she initially refused to concede after losing the close race by more than five hundred votes. She subsequently returned to academia. Appointed to the Pennsylvania Board of Education, she served from 2011 to 2018.
