= Thomas Alan Schwartz =

American historian (born 1954)

- Education: Columbia University (BA); Harvard University (PhD)
- Scientific career
- Fields: History of United States foreign policy History of the United States
- Workplaces: Vanderbilt University

Thomas Alan Schwartz (born 1954) is an American historian. He is the Distinguished Professor of History and Professor of Political Science and European Studies at Vanderbilt University. He is a biographer of Henry Kissinger, Lyndon B. Johnson, and John J. McCloy.

== Biography ==
Schwartz earned his B.A. from Columbia University and PhD from Harvard University. He taught at Harvard University, and has been teaching at Vanderbilt since 1990.

His specialization includes the history of America's foreign relations and twentieth century American history.

He formerly served as president of the Society for Historians of American Foreign Relations. From 2005 to 2008, Schwartz served on the United States Department of State’s Historical Advisory Committee as the representative of the Organization of American Historians. He was the lead drafter of the committee's 2007 annual report to the Secretary of state and United States Congress, which noted that the Office of the Historianat the State Department was having trouble retaining staff historians. It was reported that Schwartz' dismissal from the committee was due to his criticism of Marc J. Susser's management style.

== Publications ==
- America's Germany: John J. McCloy and the Federal Republic of Germany, Harvard University Press, 1991
- Lyndon Johnson and Europe: In the Shadow of Vietnam, Harvard University Press, 2000
- Henry Kissinger and American Power: A Political Biography, Hill and Wang, 2020

== Awards ==
Schwartz received the Stuart Bernath Book Prize of the Society for Historians of American Foreign Relations, and the Harry S. Truman Book Award, given by the Truman Presidential Library in 1992 for the book, America's Germany.
