= Richard Tilghman =

American politician

Member of the Pennsylvania Senate from the 17th district
- In office January 7, 1969 – August 31, 2001
- Preceded by: Robert P. Johnson
- Succeeded by: Connie Williams
- Constituency: Parts of Delaware and Montgomery Counties

Member of the Pennsylvania House of Representatives from the Montgomery County district
- In office January 2, 1967 – November 30, 1968

Personal details
- Born: March 8, 1920 Manchester, England
- Died: February 23, 2017 (aged 96) Bryn Mawr, Pennsylvania, United States
- Party: Republican
- Education: Princeton University

Richard Albert Tilghman (March 8, 1920 – February 23, 2017) was a politician who served as a Republican member of the Pennsylvania State Senate for the 17th district from 1969 to 2001. He also served in the Pennsylvania House of Representatives for the Montgomery County district from 1967 to 1968. He died on February 23, 2017, at the age of 96.

== Early life ==
Tilghman was born in Manchester, England, to Benjamin Chew and Eliza Middleton Fox Tilghman. He graduated from the Fountain Valley School in Colorado, Princeton University in 1943 and the Berlitz School of Languages. He served as a First lieutenant in the U.S. Marine Corps during World War II and received the Silver Star for action during the battle of Iwo Jima.

== Business career ==
He worked at Smith & Barney, at the General Coal Company and as a plastics manufacturing executive at Contour Manufacturing Company.

== Political career ==
He served as Chairman of the Appropriations Committee from 1974 to 2001.

As State Senator, he was an advocate for veteran organizations. He supported state funding for the construction of the Pennsylvania Veterans Memorial at Indiantown Gap National Cemetery. In 1999, he sponsored legislation providing $2 million in funding to support the construction of the National World War II Memorial in Washington D.C.
