= Polity (journal) =

Political science journal

- Discipline: Political science
- Language: English
- Edited by: Alyson Cole, Robyn Marasco, Charles Tien

Publication details
- History: 1968–present
- Publisher: University of Chicago Press
- Frequency: Quarterly
- Open access: Hybrid
- Impact factor: 1.0 (2022)

Standard abbreviations
- ISO 4: Polity

Indexing
- ISSN: 0032-3497 (print); 1744-1684 (web)
- LCCN: 77000100
- JSTOR: 00323497
- OCLC no.: 56364330

Links
- Journal homepage; Online access; Online archive

Polity is a quarterly peer-reviewed academic journal and the official journal of the Northeastern Political Science Association. It was established in 1968 at the University of Massachusetts, has been housed at the University of Connecticut, and is now based in the City University of New York (CUNY). The journal is published by the University of Chicago Press and the editors-in-chief are Alyson Cole, Robyn Marasco, and Charles Tien (City University of New York).

The journal covers research on all aspects of political life, particularly focusing on race, gender, class, colonialism, and empire. Every issue features original articles and the section “Ask a Political Scientist”, an interview with a scholar of politics on pressing issues and controversies. Biannually, the journal publishes a “Classics Revisited” feature aiming at new engagements with classic texts in the field.

== Polity Prize ==
Since 2006 an annual prize for the best research article is awarded by the Northeastern Political Science Association.

== Abstracting and indexing ==
The journal is abstracted and indexed in:

- Current Contents/Social and Behavioral Sciences
- EBSCO databases
- Index Islamicus
- ProQuest databases
- Scopus
- Social Sciences Citation Index

According to the Journal Citation Reports, the journal has a 2022 impact factor of 1.0.

== See also ==
- List of political science journals
