= John Ferejohn =

American legal scholar and political scientist

- Born: John Arthur Ferejohn; June 6, 1944 (age 81); Deming, New Mexico
- Education: San Fernando Valley State College; Stanford University
- Spouse: Sally Ferejohn
- Children: 3
- Awards: Guggenheim Fellowship (1981)
- Scientific career
- Fields: Law; Political science
- Institutions: California Institute of Technology; Stanford University; Hoover Institution; New York University School of Law
- Thesis: Congressional Influences on Water Politics (1972)

John Arthur Ferejohn (born June 6, 1944) is an American legal scholar and political scientist. He is the Samuel Tilden Professor of Law at New York University School of Law, where he has been a full-time faculty member since 2009. He previously served as a professor of social science at the California Institute of Technology and as the Carolyn S. G. Munro Professor of Political Science at Stanford University. While teaching political science at Stanford, he was also a senior fellow at their Hoover Institution. He is a member of the American Academy of Arts and Sciences, the National Academy of Sciences, and received a Guggenheim Fellowship in 1981.
