= Henry B. Dawson =

American historian

Henry Barton Dawson (June 8, 1821 – May 23, 1889) was born in Lincolnshire, England and emigrated to New York City in 1834. He was an editor of the pro-temperance The Crystal Font and Rechabite Recorder. He wrote Battles of the United States by Sea and Land, published 1858 and in 1863 an edition of The Federalist, creating controversy with James A. Hamilton and John Jay. He owned and edited the Historical Magazine from 1866 to 1876. He also authored "Westchester County, New York during the American Revolution," which was published in 1886 in J.T. Scharf's History of Westchester County.

He was married to Catharine Martling and is buried at Sleepy Hollow Cemetery in Westchester County, New York.

== References and external links ==
- University of Michigan library
