= Anthony Cheung =

Hong Kong politician and academic

Professor Anthony Cheung Bing-leung GBS, JP
- 張炳良
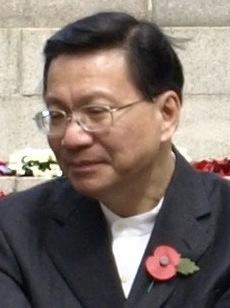

Secretary for Transport and Housing
- In office 1 July 2012 – 30 June 2017
- Chief Executive: Leung Chun-ying
- Preceded by: Eva Cheng
- Succeeded by: Frank Chan

5th President of the Hong Kong Institute of Education
- In office January 2008 – 2012
- Preceded by: Lee Wing-on (acting)
- Succeeded by: Cheng Yin-Cheong (acting)

Personal details
- Born: 17 November 1952 (age 73)
- Party: Meeting Point (1983-1994); Democratic Party (1994–2004); Independent (2004–present)
- Education: BSocSc (HKU); MSc (Aston University); PhD in Government (LSE)

Anthony Cheung Bing-leung, GBS, JP (Chinese: 張炳良; born 17 November 1952) is a Hong Kong politician and academic. He was the Secretary for Transport and Housing from 2012 to 2017 and 5th President of the Hong Kong Institute of Education (HKIEd). He was one of the few government officials coming from a pro-democracy background.

Cheung was a member of the Legislative Council of Hong Kong (Election Committee constituency) and a vice-chairman of the Democratic Party. He founded SynergyNet, a policy think tank, after he quit the Democratic party in 2004 and provides public comment on policy issues. He was also professor of Public and Social Administration in City University of Hong Kong. In 2011, he called for a separate regulatory code for the emerging class of political assistants and policy advisers, who are between civil servants and executive officials.

== Education ==
Cheung is a graduate of Wah Yan College, Hong Kong, a prestigious boys' Roman Catholic government school in Hong Kong.

He has a PhD in Government from the London School of Economics (1995), an MSc in Public Sector Management from Aston University (1984) and a BSocSc in Sociology and Economics from the University of Hong Kong (HKU) (1974). He was in the same cohort with Yeung Sum, another leading figure of Meeting Point and later Democratic Party.

In 1992, Cheung was originally appointed as one of the Hong Kong Affairs Advisors by Beijing, but was withdrawn after his announcement of formation of Democratic Party together with United Democrats of Hong Kong in 1994.

== Career ==
Cheung joined Hong Kong Government after graduating from HKU. He worked in the Government Secretariat and Independent Commission Against Corruption (ICAC). He was later the Chairman of Consumer Council from 2007 to 2012.

== Political activities ==
Cheung joined Meeting Point, a moderate pro-democratic party. He became Chairman from 1989 to 1994. After the merging of United Democrats of Hong Kong and Meeting Point, Cheung was the Vice-Chairman until 2004, when he resigned after a series of internal conflicts between him and the more radical Young Turks (少壯派).

In 2002, he and Andrew Fung co-founded SynergyNet (新力量網絡), a policy think tank.

In July 2022, Cheung said that people from Hong Kong should be realistic and not make universal suffrage a main priority.

== Research ==
Cheung joined City Polytechnic of Hong Kong (now City University of Hong Kong) in 1986. He specializes in Hong Kong politics, especially on civil service and public administration. He describes the narrative of administrative efficiency proposed by the colonial government as the effort to re-establish legitimacy and power amid the growing assertiveness of China and increasing influence of political parties, as the move diverts political pressure to respective departments.

He argues that post-Handover Hong Kong government should change its mindset and pay more attention to public opinion. Instead of following the colonial approach of administrative absorption of politics (a term coined by Ambrose King), leaders and administrators should develop creative and effective strategies to respond to influential business sector, vocal political parties and an assertive China.

As the Secretary for Transport and Housing, Cheung wrote in 2013 that the polarization and fragmentation of Hong Kong society is harmful and destructive to its political and economic well-being. He called for better coordination with the legislature, more attention to responsiveness and representation as well as "stronger social policy emphasis in public administration."

== Works ==
Books

- Public Service Reform in East Asia: Reform Issues and Challenges in Japan, Korea, Singapore and Hong Kong. Chinese University Press. 2005. (Editor)
- Governance and Public Sector Reform in Asia: Paradigm Shift or Business As Usual. RoutledgeCurzon. 2003. (Co-edited with Ian Scott)
- Public Sector Reform in Hong Kong: Into the 21st Century. Chinese University Press. 2001. (Co-edited with Jane Lee)

Articles

- "Public Governance Reform in Hong Kong: Rebuilding Trust and Governability." International Journal of Public Sector Management 26.5 (2013): 421–36.
- "Can There Be An Asian Model of Public Administration?." Public Administration and Development 33.4 (2013): 249–61.
- "One country, two experiences: administrative reforms in China and Hong Kong." International Review of Administrative Sciences 78.2 (2012): 261–83.
- "Public administration in East Asia: legacies, trajectories and lessons." International Review of Administrative Sciences 78.2 (2012): 209–16.
- "Global aspirations and strategising for world-class status: new form of politics in higher education governance in Hong Kong." Journal of Higher Education Policy and Management 33.3 (2011): 231–51. (with Ka Ho Mok)
- "In Search of Trust and Legitimacy: The political Trajectory of Hong Kong as Part of China." International Public Management Review 11.2 (2010): 38–63.
- "A Response to "Building Administrative Capacity for the Age of Rapid Globalization: A Modest Prescription for the Twenty-First Century"." Public Administration Review 69.6 (2009): 1034–6.
- "Evaluating the Ombudsman System of Hong Kong: Towards Good Governance and Citizenship Enhancement." Asia Pacific Law Review 17.1 (2009): 73–94.
- "The story of two administrative states: state capacity in Hong Kong and Singapore." Pacific Review 21.2 (2008): 121–45.
- "Combating Corruption as a Political Strategy to Rebuild Trust and Legitimacy: Can China Learn from Hong Kong?." International Public Management Review 8.2 (2007): 48–71.
- "Executive-Led Governance or Executive Power ‘Hollowed-Out’-The Political Quagmire of Hong Kong." Asian Journal of Political Science 15.1 (2007): 17–38.
- "Policy Capacity in Post-1997 Hong Kong: Constrained Institutions Facing a Crowding and Differentiated Polity." Asia Pacific Journal of Public Administration 29.1 (2007): 51–75.
- "Judicial Review and Policy Making in Hong Kong: Changing Interface Between the Legal and the Political." Asia Pacific Journal of Public Administration 28.2 (2006): 117–41. (with Max W L Wong)
- "Reinventing Hong Kong’s Public Service: Same NPM Reform, Different Contexts and Politics." International Journal of Organizational Theory & Behaviour 9.2 (2006): 212–34.
- "Budgetary reforms in two city states: impact on the central budget agency in Hong Kong and Singapore." International Review of Administrative Sciences 72.3 (2006): 341–61.
- "How Autonomous are Public Corporations in Hong Kong? The Case of the Airport Authority." Public Organization Review 6 (2006): 221–36.
- "Bureaucrats–Enterprise Negotiation in China's Enterprise Reform at the Local Level: case studies in Guangzhou." Journal of Contemporary China 14.45 (2005): 695–720.
- "What's in A Pamphlet? Shortfalls and paradoxical flaws in Hong Kong's performance pledges." Public Management Review 7.3 (2005): 341–66.
- "Whose Reason? Which Rationality? Understanding the ‘Real Worlds’ of Hong Kong’s Public Managers." Philosophy of Management 5.1 (2005): 3–14.
- "The Politics of Administrative Reforms in Asia: Paradigms and Legacies, Paths and Diversities." Governance 18.2 (2005): 257–82.
- "Hong Kong's Post-1997 Institutional Crisis: Problems of Governance and Institutional Incompatibility." Journal of East Asian Studies 5.1 (2005): 135–67.
- "Who Advised the Hong Kong Government? The Politics of Absorption before and after 1997." Asian Survey 44.6 (2004): 874–94. (with Paul C. W. Wong)
- "Strong Executive, Weak Policy Capacity: The Changing Environment of Policy-making in Hong Kong." Asian Journal of Political Science 12.1 (2004): 1–30.
- "Customerizing the Tenants, Empowering the Managers: Impact of Public Housing Governance Reform in Hong Kong." Housing, Theory and Society 20.2 (2003): 98–109. (with N. M. Yip)
- "Health Finance." The Chinese Economy 35.6 (2002): 34–67. (with Gu Xingyuan)
- "Modernizing Public Healthcare Governance in Hong Kong: A Case Study of Professional Power in New Public Management." Public Management Review 4.3 (2002): 343–65.
- "Public enterprises and privatization in East Asia: paths, politics and prospects." Public Finance and Management 2.1 (2002): 81–116.
- "The New Two-Pronged Strategy of Enterprise Reform in China." Problems of Post-Communism 48.5 (2001): 52–61. (with Ma Ngok and Mok Ka-ho)
- "Civil Service Reform in Post-1997 Hong Kong: Political Challenges, Managerial Responses?." International Journal of Public Administration 24.9 (2001): 929–50.
- "Post-Transition Hong Kong." International Journal of Public Administration 24.9 (2001): 843–6. (with Ming Sing)
- "The Paradox of China’s Wage System Reforms: Balancing Stakeholders’ Rationalities." Public Administration Quarterly 24.4 (2000): 491–521. (with Kitty Poon)
- "Globalization versus Asian Values: Alternative Paradigms in Understanding Governance and Administration." Asian Journal of Political Science 8.2 (2000): 1–16.
- "New Interventionism in the Making: Interpreting state interventions in Hong Kong after the change of sovereignty." Journal of Contemporary China 9.24 (2000): 291–308.
- "Understanding public-sector reforms: global trends and diverse agendas." International Review of Administrative Sciences 63.4 (1997): 435–57.
- "Rebureaucratization of Politics in Hong Kong: Prospects after 1997." Asian Survey 37.8 (1997): 720–37.
- "Public sector reform and the re-legitimation of public bureaucratic power: The case of Hong Kong." International Journal of Public Sector Management 9.5/6 (1996): 37–50.
- "Performance pledges–power to the consumer or a quagmire in public service legitimation?." International Journal of Public Administration 19.2 (1996): 233–59.
- "Efficiency As the Rhetoric: Public-Sector Reform in Hong Kong Explained." International Review of Administrative Sciences 62.1 (1996): 31–47.
- "Public Sector Reform in Hong Kong: Perspectives and Problems." Asian Journal of Public Administration 14.2 (1992): 115–48.

Party political offices
Preceded by Yeung Sum	Chairman of Meeting Point; 1989–1994	Merged into Democratic Party
New political party	Vice Chairperson of Democratic Party; 1994–1998; Served alongside: Yeung Sum	Succeeded by Lau Chin-shek
Legislative Council of Hong Kong
New constituency	Member of Legislative Council; Representative for Election Committee; 1995–1997	Replaced by Provisional Legislative Council
Political offices
Preceded by KC Chan	Chairman of Hong Kong Consumer Council; 2007–2012	Succeeded by Wong Yuk-shan
Preceded by Eva Cheng	Secretary for Transport and Housing; 2012–2017	Succeeded by Frank Chan
Preceded by Eva Cheng	Chairman of Hong Kong Housing Authority; 2012–2017	Succeeded by Frank Chan
Academic offices
Preceded by Lee Wing-on acting	President of the Hong Kong Institute of Education; 2008–2012	Succeeded by Cheng Yin-cheong acting
