= Gerrit van Poelje =

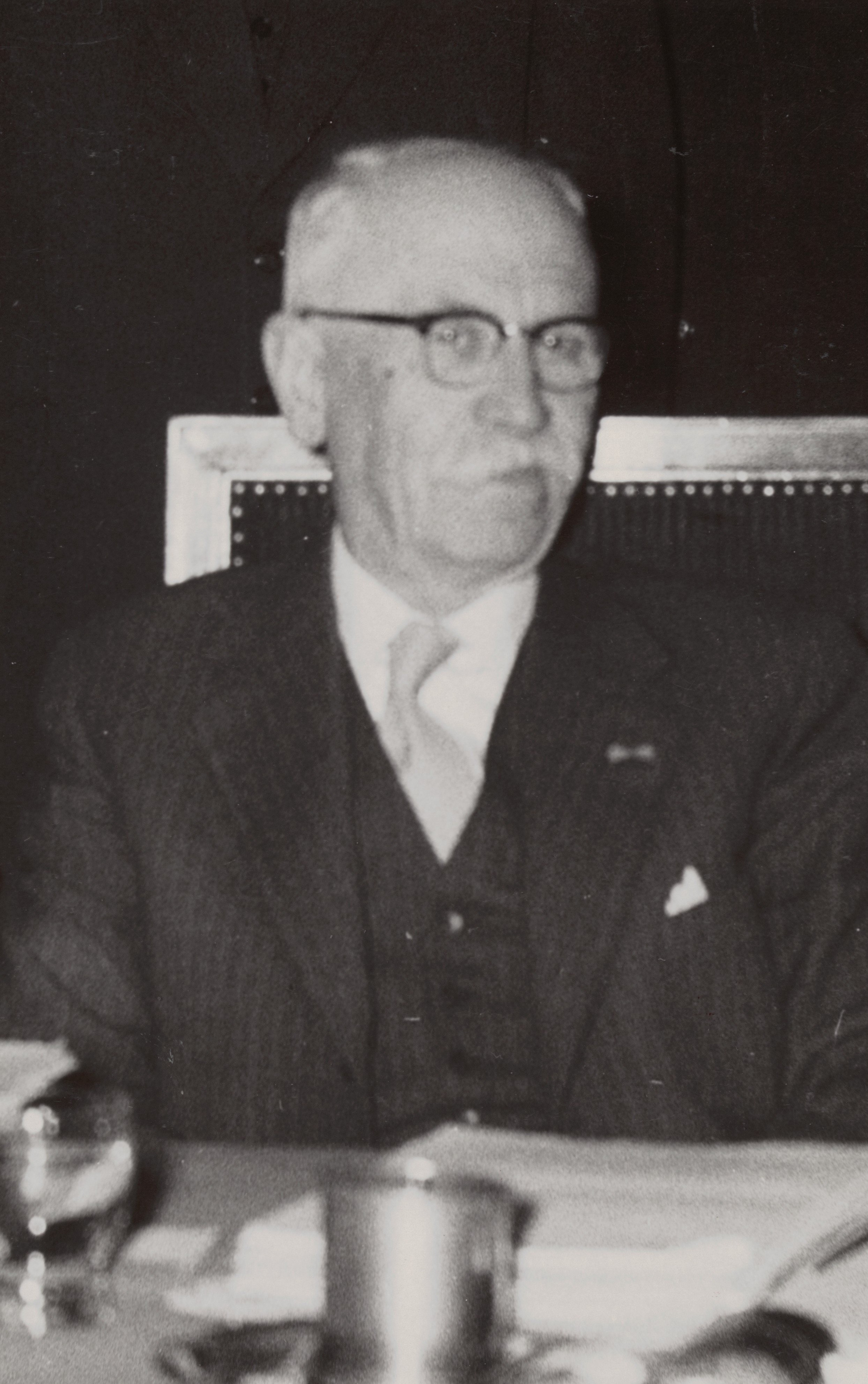

Gerrit Abraham van Poelje (January 31, 1884, in Naaldwijk – September 8, 1976, in The Hague) was a Dutch civil servant, lawyer and Public Administration scholar. He is considered one of the most important founders of the science of Public Administration in The Netherlands.

Van Poelje was born on January 31, 1884, in Maasdijk (in the municipality of Naaldwijk) as the son of Izaak Lodewijk Anthonie, a teacher, and Christine Marie Antoinette Garbrij.

Just like his father, Van Poelje aspired to a career as a teacher. He did not succeed in that profession however, because of speech impediment resulting from a harelip. He then studied law at the Leiden University, where he also obtained his doctorate in law.

In 1914, he married Lucie Charlotte Hansen. They had two children.

Van Poelje's professional career in the municipal administration progressed rapidly and in 1919 he became a top civil servant in the municipality of The Hague.

Because he was taught to write with his right hand, although he was left-handed, his writing was barely readable. Therefore, the municipality of The Hague procured a typewriter at his request, although the mayor thought that one could not write his ideas on paper when using a typewriter.

In 1928 Van Poelje accepted a professorship in the science of Public Administration at the Nederlandsche Handels-Hoogeschool in Rotterdam (presently known as the Erasmus University in Rotterdam),

In this function Van Poelje could develop the Dutch science of Public Administration.

Van Poelje remained professor until 1933, when he became secretary-general of the ministry of education, arts and sciences, a function he held until 1940, when the Nazis invaded The Netherlands.

During the Second World War Van Poelje was interned by the German occupying forces on September 2, 1940, first in the Scheveningen prison, later on in Büchenwald, Merseburg and Halle.

After the Second World War Van Poelje was appointed a member of the Council of State in August 1945, where he had a dominant input. He served in this function until his retirement in 1958.

The Dutch Association for Public Administration has linked the name of Van Poelje to its renowned prize for the best publication in the science of Public Administration.
