= New public management =

Approach to running public services

New public management (NPM) is an approach to the administration of public service organizations that is employed in government and public service institutions and agencies at both the sub-national and national levels. The term was first introduced by academics in the UK and Australia to describe approaches that were developed during the 1980s as part of an effort to make the public service more "businesslike" and to improve its efficiency by using private sector management models.

As with the private sector, which focuses on customer service and maximizing shareholder wealth, NPM reforms often focused on the "centrality of citizens who were the recipients of the services or customers to the public sector". NPM reformers experimented with using decentralized service delivery models, to give local agencies more freedom in how they delivered programmes or services. In some cases, NPM reforms that used e-government consolidated a programme or service to a central location to reduce costs. Some governments tried using quasi-market structures, so that the public sector would have to compete against the private sector (notably in the UK, in health care). Key themes in NPM were "financial control, value for money, increasing efficiency ..., identifying and setting targets and continuance monitoring of performance, handing over ... power to the senior management" executives. Performance was assessed with audits, benchmarks and performance evaluations. Some NPM reforms used private sector companies to deliver what were formerly public services.

NPM advocates in some countries worked to remove "collective agreements [in favour of] ... individual rewards packages at senior levels combined with short term contracts" and introduce private sector-style corporate governance, including using a board of directors approach to strategic guidance for public organizations. While NPM approaches have been used in many countries around the world, NPM is particularly associated with the most industrialized OECD nations such as the United Kingdom, Australia and the United States of America. NPM advocates focus on using approaches from the private sector – the corporate or business world – which can be successfully applied in the public sector and in a public administration context. NPM approaches have been used to reform the public sector, its policies and its programmes. NPM advocates claim that it is a more efficient and effective means of attaining the same outcome.

In NPM, citizens are viewed as "customers" and public servants are viewed as public managers. NPM tries to realign the relationship between public service managers and their political superiors by making a parallel relationship between the two. Under NPM, public managers have incentive-based motivation such as pay-for-performance, and clear performance targets are often set, which are assessed by using performance evaluations. As well, managers in an NPM paradigm may have greater discretion and freedom as to how they go about achieving the goals set for them. This NPM approach is contrasted with the traditional public administration model, in which institutional decision-making, policy-making and public service delivery is guided by regulations, legislation and administrative procedures.

NPM reforms use approaches such as disaggregation, customer satisfaction initiatives, performance indicators, customer service efforts, applying an entrepreneurial spirit to public service, and introducing innovations. The NPM system allows "the expert manager to have a greater discretion". "Public Managers under the New Public Management reforms can provide a range of choices from which customers can choose, including the right to opt out of the service delivery system completely".

== Evolution ==
The first practices of new public management emerged in the United Kingdom under the leadership of Prime Minister Margaret Thatcher. Thatcher played the functional role of "policy entrepreneur" and the official role of prime minister. Thatcher drove changes in public management policy in such areas as organizational methods, civil service, labor relations, expenditure planning, financial management, audit, evaluation, and procurement.

Thatcher's successor, John Major, kept public management policy on the agenda of the Conservative government, leading to the implementation of the Next Steps Initiative. Major also launched the programmes of the Citizens Charter Initiative, Competing for Quality, Resource Accounting and Budgeting, and the Private Finance Initiative.

A term was coined in the late 1980s to denote a new (or renewed) focus on the importance of management and 'production engineering' in public service delivery, which often linked to doctrines of economic rationalism (Hood 1989, Pollitt 1993). During this timeframe public management became an active area of policy-making in numerous other countries, notably in New Zealand, Australia, and Sweden. At the same time, Organisation for Economic Co-operation and Development (OECD) established its Public Management Committee and Secretariat (PUMA), conferring to public management the status normally accorded to more conventional domains of policy. In the 1990s, public management was a major item on President Clinton's agenda. Early policy actions of the Clinton administration included launching the National Partnership and signing into law the Government Performance and Results Act. Currently there are few indications that public management issues will vanish from governmental policy agendas. A recent study showed that in Italy, municipal directors are aware of a public administration now being oriented toward new public management where they are assessed according to the results they produce.

The term new public management (NPM) expresses the idea that the cumulative flow of policy decisions over the past twenty years has amounted to a substantial shift in the governance and management of the "state sector" in the United Kingdom, New Zealand, Australia, Scandinavia, North America, and Latin America. For instance, regional innovation agencies were created under NPM principles to support the innovation process. A benign interpretation is that these decisions have been a defensible, if imperfect, response to policy problems. Those problems as well as their solutions were formulated within the policy-making process. The agenda-setting process has been heavily influenced by electoral commitments to improve macro-economic performance and to contain growth in the public sector, as well as by a growing perception of public bureaucracies as being inefficient. The alternative-generation process has been heavily influenced by ideas coming from economics and from various quarters within the field of management.

== Globalization ==
The initial New Public Management (NPM) reforms implemented in Anglo-Saxon countries inspired reforms across the world. These reforms, which were triggered and motivated by a variety of factors and resulted in the development of various models, led to the emergence of a global NPM trend. Despite the global nature of the movement, the concepts and models of the reform were diverse and developed in accordance with each country's specific and unique context and in response to the distinct challenges that it was facing. Therefore, in spite of the common features of the reforms, their driving factors, objectives, extent, and areas of focus varied across countries.

While, in many countries, NPM reforms were inspired and influenced by the reforms implemented beyond their national boundaries, the driving factors of the reforms varied significantly across regions as well as across countries of the same region. In Europe, for instance, whereas the reforms in the Netherlands started in reaction to fiscal stringency, the driving factor for reform in Germany came from within the system as local government managers and politicians were dissatisfied with the traditional bureaucratic system and its shortcomings. Moreover, although the NPM reforms of Switzerland were influenced by the Netherlands' Tilburg model, their main motivator was dissatisfaction with the old public management system and its deficiencies. In Africa, on the other hand, the main motivating and driving factors of the NPM reforms were bureaucratic corruption, dysfunctional governance system, fiscal crises, and the success of the reforms in other countries. For developing nations and former communist countries, the motivation for reforms was benefiting from participation in a globalized economy and fulfilling the requirements of international donors.

Although NPM reforms mainly aimed at increasing efficiency and decreasing costs of the public sector, each country's reforms were focused on certain specific areas. In South Africa and Zambia, for instance, independent authorities were created for tax collection with the primary goal of promoting accountability. In Germany, the NPM reforms mainly focused on internal reforms. In France, the 1982 Act of Decentralization, which created autonomous local collectivities in the areas of budgeting and taxation, led to managerialism and privatization. The reforms also varied across time. For instance, while reorganization of responsibilities was the main focus area of the Tilburg model in the 1980s, the reform goals were reoriented from internal restructuring to the external environment focusing on the role of citizens in the 1990s.

Across countries, various actors played different roles in initiating, facilitating, and implementing NPM reforms. In the Netherlands and Germany, for instance, the reforms were initiated by local governments. However, the reforms in the Netherlands were supported by the central government while the New Steering model of Germany did not receive any support from the federal government. In Africa, most of the reforms were introduced and implemented by national governments. While national and local governments played a central role in initiating and implementing the reforms, some international organizations had a crucial role in facilitating and driving the reforms. For instance, OECD played a vital role in facilitating the transfer of reforms across its member countries by developing tools and guidelines. Moreover, it was the World Bank and IMF that pushed non-Western and developing countries toward public management reforms. In Africa, for example, the reforms were part of the "economic liberalization packages of structural adjustment."

== Aspects ==
NPM was accepted as the "gold standard for administrative reform" in the 1990s. The idea for using this method for government reform was that if the government guided private-sector principles were used rather than rigid hierarchical bureaucracy, it would work more efficiently. NPM promotes a shift from bureaucratic administration to business-like professional management. NPM was cited as the solution for management ills in various organizational context and policy making in education and health care reform.

The basic principles of NPM can best be described when split into seven different aspects elaborated by Christopher Hood in 1991. Hood also invented the term NPM itself. They are the following:

=== Management ===
Because of its belief in the importance and strength of privatizing government, it is critical to have an emphasis on management by engaging in hands-on methods. This theory allows leaders the freedom to manage freely and open up discretion.

=== Performance standards ===
Its critical to preserve express measures and measures of execution in a workforce. Utilizing this strategy advances clarification of goals/intent, targets, and markers for movement.

=== Output controls ===
The third point acknowledges the "shift from the use of input controls and bureaucratic procedures to rules relying on output controls measured by quantitive performance indicators". This aspect requires using performance based assessments when looking to outsource work to private companies/groups.

=== Decentralization ===
NPM advocates frequently moved from a bound together administration framework to a decentralized framework in which directors pick up adaptability and are not constrained to organization restrictions.

=== Competition ===
This characteristic centers on how NPM can advance competition within the public sector which may in turn lower fetched [?], dispose of debate and conceivably accomplish a better quality of progress/work through term contracts. Competition can also be found when the government offers contracts to the private segments and the contract is given in terms of the capacity to provide the benefit viably and quality of the merchandise given. Subsequently this will increment competition since the other private division which did not get the contract will make strides to ensure the quality and capacity subsequently encouraging competition.

=== Private-sector management ===
This viewpoint centres on the need to set up short-term labour contracts, create corporate plans or trade plans, execution assentions [?] and mission statements. It moreover centres on setting up a working environment in which open representatives or temporary workers are mindful of the objectives and intention that offices are attempting to reach.

=== Cost reduction ===
The most effective aim which has led to its ascent into global popularity focuses on keeping cost low and efficiency high. "Doing more with less" moreover cost reduction stimulates efficiency and is one way which makes it different from the traditional approaches to management.

== Issues ==
=== Criticisms ===
There are blurred lines between policymaking and providing services in the new public management system. Questions have been raised about the potential politicization of the public service, when executives are hired on contract under pay-for-performance systems. The ability for citizens to effectively choose the appropriate government services they need has also been challenged. "The notion of choice is essential to the economic concept of a customer. Generally, in government there are few if any choices." There are concerns that public managers move away from trying to meet citizens' needs and limitations on accountability to the public. NPM brings into question integrity and compliance when dealing with incentives for public managers – the interests of customers and owners do not always align. Questions such as managers being more or less faithful arise. The public interest is at risk and could undermine the trust in government. "Government must be accountable to the larger public interest, not only to individual immediate customers or consumers [of government services.]"

==== Relevance ====
Although NPM had a dramatic impact in the 1990s on managing and policymaking, many scholars believe that NPM has hit its prime. Scholars like Patrick Dunleavy believe New Public Management is phasing out because of disconnect with "customers" and their institutions. Scholars cite the digital era and the new importance of technology that kills the necessity of NPM. In countries that are less industrialized the NPM concept is still growing and spreading. This trend has much to do with a country's ability or inability to get their public sector in tune with the digital Era. New public management was created in the public sector to create change based on disaggregation, competition, and incentives. Using incentives to produce the maximum services from an organization is largely stalled in many countries and being reversed because of increased complexity.

=== Alternatives ===
Post-NPM, many countries explored digital era governance (DEG). Dunleavy believes this new way of governance should be heavily centred upon information and technology. Technology will help re-integrate with digitalization changes. Digital era governance provides a unique opportunity for self-sustainability; however, there are various factors that will determine whether or not DEG can be implemented successfully. When countries have proper technology, NPM simply cannot compete very well with DEG. DEG does an excellent job of making services more accurate, prompt and remove most barriers and conflicts. DEG also can improve the service quality and provide local access to outsourcers.

AM Omar (2020) challenged DEG by integrating the governance approach with social media technology. The work on Brunei's Information Department titled "Digital Era Governance and Social Media: The Case of Information Department Brunei. In Employing Recent Technologies for Improved Digital Governance" works to provide the theoretical and practical basis to substantiate the claim. The work concludes that digital dividends can be secured through the effective application of Social Media in the governance process.

The New Public Service (NPS) is a newly developed theory for 21st-century citizen-focused public administration. This work directly challenges the clientelism and rationalist paradigm of the New Public Management. NPS focuses on democratic governance and re-imagining the accountability of public administrators toward citizens. NPS posits that administrators should be a broker between citizens and their government, focusing on citizen engagement in political and administrative issues.

=== Comparisons to new public administration ===
New public management is often mistakenly compared to new public administration. The new public administration movement was one established in the US during the late 1960s and early 1970s. Though there may be some common features, the central themes of the two movements are different. The main thrust of the new public administration movement was to bring academic public administration into line with an anti-hierarchical egalitarian movement that was influential in US university campuses and among public sector workers. By contrast, the emphasis of the new public management movement a decade or so later was firmly managerially normative in that it stressed the difference that management could and should make in the quality and efficiency of public services. It focuses on public service production functions and operational issues contrasted with the focus on public accountability, 'model employer' public service values, 'due process', and what happens inside public organizations in conventional public administration.

The table below gives a side-by-side comparison of the two systems' core aspects/characteristics.

New Public Management	New Public Administration
Hands-on approach	Anti-hierarchical, anti-positivist
Explicit standards	Democratic citizenship
Emphasis on output control	Internal regulations
Disconnection of units	Equity
Importance of the private sector	Importance of public citizens
Improve timing	Stability
Greater usage of money	Socioemotional
