= Teleadministration =

Early usage of electronic documents in the legal system

Teleadministration is based on the concept that documents in electronic format have legal value. Administrative informatics is not new, but for many years it was merely information technology applied to legal documents; that is, the reproduction of paper-based legal documents into electronic file systems. Instead, teleadministration turns this approach into its head. It is based on research conducted in 1978, the year when, at a conference promoted by the Court of Cassation, Giovanni Duni launched the then-futuristic idea that an electronic document could have legal value. 1978 was also the year in which the first research on digital signatures (RSA) was published in the United States, yet it would take more than twenty-five years for jurists and mathematicians to start working together.

For many years, and even before 1978, IT helped public administration but kept a "safe distance", assuming that the 'sacred nature' of the law demanded the use of pen and paper. Information technology merely managed and filed copies of legal documents: it was known as "parallel IT", since it was an accessory to the activity with formal value, the one based on pen and paper.

Thus, the logical, legal and material premise of teleadministration is the conferment of legal value to IT documents.

== Origins and terminology ==
In Italy, the linguistic expression teleamministrazione was first used in 1991 at the Roman 'La Sapienza' university, during a conference organised by the Court of Cassation, in which it was said that: "the new system of administrative information technology is called "teleadministration" because all the work of the Public Administration will be carried out through devices, that could also be computers, linked to the central server through a network." Teleadministration was indeed considered a type of teleworking.

With teleadministration, administrative procedures become electronic administrative procedures and, more specifically, those that are initiated by a party realize the electronic one stop shop.

== Fundamentals ==
In the decades from 1970 to 1990, the Court of Cassation was at the core of research on the relationship between IT and law, organising international conferences every five years on the topic. The 1993 international conference featured the fundamentals of teleadministration, providing the details of the administrative systems behind the one stop shop concept:

1. A citizen presents a claim to one administration, which then manages the entire procedure.
2. A single "administrative file" is created, no matter how many different administrations may be involved.
3. For both internal and external stages in an administrative procedure, a "warning signal" is sent telematically to the relevant office where the next stage is due, the employee in that office then becomes responsible for that phase of the procedure.
4. Any information concerning records already held by public administration is accessed telematically, without involving the citizen.
5. The (electronic) signature identifies the identity of the operator through sophisticated techniques.
6. The original of an administrative act is electronic and is therefore always available telematically to any administration that may need it.
7. The presence of an increasing amount of on-line data will necessitate greater use of automatic data processing in decision-making.
8. Saving data on multiple memory locations will guarantee the safekeeping of the acts.
9. Statistical data will be available in real time and under multiple profiles, with great benefits for top level decision-making.
10. Private citizens can obtain paper copies of the electronic acts.

The 5th fundamental mentions electronic rather than digital signatures. This is because, in the jurists' domain, digital signatures were not yet known. The generic reference to the electronic signature is however valid, and its general nature is actually suitable for the rules contained six years later in the Directive 1999/93/EC. The Directive refers in particular to all procedures initiated by private citizens, but the system remains valid for all procedures initiated by the administration offices as well.

== Acknowledgement of the principles in current law ==
The legally accepted form of acts and documents evolved according to the following stages:

1. Acts only exist in paper form
2. Acts in electronic format are a possible option
3. Electronic format is compulsory, safe for a few exceptions

In Italy, Phase 2 was launched by Art 15, para, 2, Law N. 59 of 15 March 1997, (the so-called 'Bassanini 1' law: it established the legal value of electronic documents, while regulations would establish the authentication criteria). The EC intervened later with its Directive 1999/93/EC of the European Parliament and the Council of 13 December 1999 (Transposed by Law Decree N.10 of 23 January 2002), which imposes an obligation on Member States to give legal value to documents with digital signatures (not directly named as such, but all their features are described in the directive). It also establishes that electronic documents should not be rejected a priori, hence opening to a range of different solutions to establish the authorship of a document (the so-called 'weak signatures').

The 1993 Directive was revoked and absorbed (for reasons of legal certainty and clarity) by Regulation 910/2014 of the European Parliament and Council of 23 July 2014 (also known as eIDAS regulation) in the OJEU 28 August 2014, which did not renege on the principle of also accepting the so-called 'weak signatures'. In Italy, The move to Phase 3 was established by Art.40 of Legislative Decree N.82 of 7 March 2007, Code of Digital Administration (CAD), entitled "Creation of electronic documents", which states: "Public Administrations make the original copy of their documents with electronic means, according to the provisions of the present Code and the technical specifications of Article 71". Exceptions are extremely rare: Comma 3 states: by means of appropriate regulations...., proposed by the delegated Ministers for Public Functions, Innovation and Technology and the Minister for Cultural Heritage and Activities, the categories of administrative documents that can be created on paper in original are identified, having regard to the special historical and archive value they will have by nature" (think, for example, of the resignation of a President of the Republic).

National administrations are ignoring this provision, and today it is only private companies that are no longer allowed paper-based communication with public administrations (Art. N. 5 bis of the CAD and D.P.C.M. 22 July 2011); compulsory electronic invoicing was added on 31 March 2015 by Law N. 44 of 24 December 2007, Art. N. 1, para 209-214 implemented by Ministerial Decree N.55 of 3 April 2013, further clarified by Ministerial circular N.1 of 9 March 2015. The modernisation of procedures was also touched by Presidential Decree N. 447 of 20 October 1998 (creation of the One Stop Shop, but only for production activities, and paper based), while interest for a telematic procedure only began with Legislative Decree N. 82 of 7 March 2005, CAD, which is not as relevant in its first version but was later modified by several interventions, particularly Legislative Decree N. 335 of 10 December 2013.

European sources are also essential. The EC, and later the European Union, have undertaken a wide range of actions on e-government: one of the most important was the launch of the IDABC programme (and financing) for Interoperable Delivery of European eGovernment Services to public Administrations, Business and Citizens, via Decision 2004/387/EC of the European Parliament and Council of 21 April 2004. However, the ultimate acknowledgement of the principles of teleadministration, with the telematic One Stop Shop, is contained in the Directive 2006/123/EC of the European Parliament and Council of 12 December 2006, on the Internal market for services, which provides for Member States to set up an electronic One Stop Shop in the wide field of administrative procedures.

== 'Star' procedure ==
Once paper based documents are abandoned, the real-time flow of documents greatly improves time management and responsibility of the single offices/ operators, while direct online access improves transparency. Teleadministration promotes maximum usage of the "star procedure", known and researched in Germany as "Sternverfahren". This procedure, an alternative to the sequential procedure, which has by nature longer head times, in the paper-based world would require making several copies of the administrative file (which can be extremely voluminous) for each office and each administration that needs to express an opinion or issue an authorisation. With the One Stop Shop, the administration initiating the process is charged with this task. Electronic files clearly provide evident benefits for these procedures, since all involved administrations can directly and simultaneously access the file, view the part they need to evaluate and add their opinion or authorisation directly, using a star-shaped scheme.

== Assessing actual acceptance in current law and real life ==
As a scientific proposition, teleadministration sketched the system of telematic administrative procedures well ahead of the law, and particularly the electronic One Stop Shop concept. Both concepts are based on the dematerialisation of documents and on telematic administrative work.

The concept of documents' dematerialisation, in existence since 1978 as a scientific notion, was first embraced in Italy (Law N. 59 of 15 March 1997, Art. 15, para 2) and later by the E.C. in Directive 1999/93/EC.

Once the principle that an electronic document can have legal value was accepted, it was possible to deal with its management within a telematic procedure. As mentioned, configuring this procedure within the rules of teleadministration is today accepted in both European and Italian laws. European laws also provide quite a detailed description of the electronic One Stop Shop, with rules that fit nicely within the scientific rules of teleadministration; their main limitation is that they were specifically designed for the free circulation of services within Europe, and hence for the procedures these require. It is the above-mentioned 1996/123/EC Directive, whose Art.6 establishes the One Stop Shop and Art. 8 provides that it should be managed "remotely and electronically", leaving further details to the commission. And indeed the commission, with its Decision of 16 October 2009, provided a number of measures to facilitate the use of electronic procedures through the "One Stop Shop" under Directive 2006/123/EC. These sources are clear and they apply to a wide-ranging sector: the problem is that any sector or procedure that is not related to the supply of services within the Union is not regulated, and Member States are therefore able to carry on with old-fashioned paper-based procedures.

In regards to this limitation, a group of European Law academics, coordinated by Giovanni Duni, drafted a text for a Directive providing a universal system of telematic administrative procedure.

Italian sources are based on the Code of Digital Administration, the above-mentioned Law Decree N.82 of 7 March 2005 in its current version, following several modifications, which (if correctly interpreted and implemented) should make it compulsory for all public administrations to use teleadministration, thus making the telematic administrative procedure the default procedural method. Art. 14, the key provision, establishes that the proceeding administration creates an electronic file, to which all involved administrations can and should have access, and feed it with the acts of their competence. Private citizens can also access it under Law 241/90 Thus the electronic file is the technical and organizational specification of the telematic administrative procedure, as it is clear that its creation is an operative stage of the procedure and not simply a new filing system for the archives.

Art. 10 of the CAD appears at first to be at odds with this interpretation, since it establishes that the One Stop Shop for productive activities provides its services electronically but leaves doubts about the possibility that the back office activities could be still paper-based. However, if Art. 10 and Art. 41 are interpreted together, the only possible conclusion is that the former is a clarification of front office activities, but all the administrative activity is based on the general rule of electronic files, and therefore on the teleadministration and the One Stop Shop. Compared to European and Italian law, reality is somewhat behind. Eight years after Directive 1996/123/CE, there would be grounds for an infraction procedure against Italy. But since Italy enjoys the company of several other non-compliant Member States, they are all 'safe' for the time being.

Though the letter of the CAD may be not be respected, it seems very unlikely that this may determine the invalidity or nullity of the acts for violation of Art. 41(electronic file) or Art. 40 (statutory requirement of digital signature), because in front of a claim of this nature, the administrative judge would apply Artt. 21 septies and 21 octies of Law 241/90. The claimant should demonstrate that the use of the electronic format and electronic file would have led to a different outcome.

== Legal sources ==
=== US law ===
1995 Utah Code, paras 46-3-101 to 46-3-504 (Enacted by Law 1995, Ch. 61). US Senate, S. 1594, Digital Signature and Electronic Authentication Law (SEAL) of 1998. — US House of Representatives, H.R. 3472, Digital Signature and Electronic Authentication Law (SEAL) of 1998

=== EU law ===
- European Parliament and Council Directive 1999/93/EC of 13 December 1999, revoked and absorbed by European Parliament and Council Regulation 910/2014 of 23 July 2014, (known as the eIDAS regulation) in OJEU 28 August 2014.
- European Parliament and Council Decision 2004/387/EC of 21 April 2004 on the interoperable delivery of European eGovernment services
- European Parliament and Council Directive 2006/123/EC of 12 December 2006, on internal market services, providing for Member States to establish the electronic One Stop Shop in this vast field of administrative procedures.
- Decision of 16 October 2009, establishing measures to facilitate electronic procedures through the «One Stop Shop» under Directive 2006/123/CE

The telematic procedures in the European Union. Introducing a draft Directive, research coordinated by Duni, G., in CNR ITTIG Informatica e diritto, Vol. XXI, 2012, n. 2, pp. 113–129 and in www.teleamministrazione.it.

- Regulation of the European Parliament and of the Council of 23 July 2014, no. 910/2014 (abbreviated as eIDAS Regulation) in OJE 28 August 2014.

=== Italian law ===
- l. 15 March 1997, N. 59, art. 15, para, 2.
- D. lg. 23 January 2002, N. 10.
- D.P.R. 20 October 1998, N. 447
- D. legisl. 7 March 2005, N. 82, codice dell'amministrazione digitale (CAD)
- D.P.C.M. 22 July 2011
- D. Legisl 10 December 2013, N. 335
- D. Legisl. December 10, 2016, no. 179, (last modification to the Italian Code of Digital Administration)

== See also ==
- Bureaucrat
- Digital era governance
- E-government
- E-Government Act of 2002
- Electronic document
- Electronic paper
- Paperless office
- Public administration

== Bibliography ==
- Contaldo, A., La teleamministrazione con reti transnazionali europee come strumento per l'integrazione delle Pubbliche Amministrazioni dei paesi dell'Unione Europea, in Riv. trim. diritto amministrativo, I, 2004, p. 95 and later
- Diffie and Hellman, New directions in Cryptography, in IEEE Transactions on Information Theory, November 1976, 644 ss
- Duni, G., L'utilizzabilità delle tecniche elettroniche nell'emanazione degli atti e nei procedimenti amministrativi. Spunto per una teoria dell'atto amministrativo emanato nella forma elettronica, in "Rivista amm. della Repubblica italiana", 1978, pag.407 ss. — Il progetto nazionale di teleamministrazione pubblica, in "L'informatica giuridica e il Ced della Corte di Cassazione", proceedings of the conference held at Univ. of Rome "La Sapienza", 27-29 Nov. 1991, Milan 1992, p. 87 ss. — La teleamministrazione: una "scommessa" per il futuro del Paese, presentation at the 5th International Congress at the Court of Cassation on "IT and Legal Activity" Rome, 3–7 May 1993, I.P.Z.S. - Libreria dello Stato, 1994, II, p. 381 ss. — Amministrazione digitale, Item under the Enciclopedia del diritto, Annali, I, Milan 2007, p. 13-49 — L'amministrazione digitale. Il diritto amministrativo nell'evoluzione telematica, Giuffrè 2008.
- Flora, F., Evoluzione della informatica nel sistema di governo degli Stati Uniti d'America. Dissertation, Cagliari, Dept. Of Political Science, November 1996.
- Gagliotti, A., Teleamministrazione e concorsi pubblici, in Giustizia amministrativa n. 3/2003, http://www.giustamm.it/ago1/articoli/gaglioti_teleamministrazione.htm#_ednref5
- Gardner, Un nuovo tipo di cifrario che richiederebbe milioni di anni per essere decifrato, in Le Scienze, December 1977, 126 ss.
- Masucci, Informatica pubblica, in Dizionario di diritto pubblico directed by S. Cassese, IV, Milan, 2006, 3115 ss.;
- Notarmuzi, Il codice dell'amministrazione digitale, in Astrid Rassegna, www.astrid-online.it, 2006, n. 12; Id., Il procedimento amministrativo informatico, ivi, n. 16;
- Osnaghi, Firme elettroniche e documento informatico: il codice richiede ulteriori integrazioni, ivi, n. 10;
- Rabbito. c., L'informatica al servizio della pubblica amministrazione. Dai principi della teleamministrazione ai piani di e-government, Gedit, 2007.
- Rivest, Shamir e Adleman, A method for obtaining digital signature and public key cryptosystems, in Communications of the ACM, vol. 21, February 1978, 120–126
- The telematic procedures in the European Union. Introducing a draft Directive, ricerca coordinata da Duni, g., in CNR ITTIG Informatica e diritto, Vol. XXI, 2012, N. 2, pp. 113–129 and in www.teleamministrazione.it.
- Applicazioni della multimedialità nella P.A.: teleamministrazione e telelavoro", in Funzione Pubblica, special issue "I convegni di FORUM P.A. '96", volume I, p. 105.
