= New public administration =

Perspective in citizen-centric administration

The new public administration (NPA) is a perspective in public administration that emerged in the late 20th century, focusing on more collaborative and citizen-centric approach. It emphasizes responsiveness to public needs, community involvement, and the integration of management and social science principles in public sector decision-making. NPA advocates for a shift from traditional bureaucratic models to more flexible and participatory governance structures.

== History ==
Public administration is the term traditionally used to define the formal arrangements under which public organizations serve a government, ostensibly in the public interest. The development of the public administration model dating from the mid-1800s to the early 1900s was influenced primarily by Weber's theory of bureaucracy, Northcote and Trevelyan's recommendations relating to the establishment of a professional civil service in Britain, and Woodrow Wilson's ideas in the United States for the separation of policy from administration (Hughes, 1994). And the other managerial theories and concepts over the years have been relevant including Taylor's scientific management and Simon's rational decision-making. Since the 1980s, the traditional model of public administration has been largely rejected by governments in favor of a more focused managerialist model based on private-sector practice, within the context of a market-based economic model of public organization. In more recent years, there have been attempts to balance the economic focus with a renewed emphasis on public organization creating public value. This contribution will first examine the traditional model of public administration including the conceptual and theoretical bases and how this affected organizational aspects. Second, it will explore how and why there has been a paradigm shift from public administration to public management. Third, it will consider future trends.

Public administration is the term used to define the formal procedural and organizational arrangements under which public employees serve a government, by implementing and advising on policy, and managing resources. Organizational aspects refer to both the overall structures as well as the relationships that occur within public administrations. This could include: The organizations that make up a civil service, sometimes referred to as the machinery of government, internal organizational arrangements, and organizational behavior. Thus, organizational aspects can be studied in a broad sense or within several defined fields. This contribution covers organizational aspects, widely interpreted.

Beyond public administration as a discrete body of knowledge, organizational aspects can be examined through other theories and practices relating to, for example, political science, public policy, sociology, economics, and management. In this sense, each area of study has its own theories and concepts. Furthermore, each state has its own history, organizational form, and approach. However, there are many universal, common elements, which have developed through the international transfer of ideas. New governments, formal review processes, focused research, and events have often stimulated notable change. Therefore, the area of public administration is a difficult area to research, and over the years studies have been largely descriptive rather than empirical.

New public administration theory deals with the following issues:

- Democratic citizenship; Refers directly to the belief in creating a government where the "common man" has a voice in politics. For such an approach to work, citizens must become aware, knowledgeable, and active in their communities and nations. True democratic citizenship requires more than voting for representatives. It requires using one's own mind, voice, and actions.
- Public interest; Refers to the collective common good within society, to which is the main objective of public interest.
- Public policy; The means by which new public policy is enacted, and introduced. Not limited in participation of the public but encouraged involvement.
- Services to citizens; Providing and upholding the moral and ethical standard in regards to meeting the needs of citizens through institutions and bureaucracies.

First, a "new" theory should start with the ideal of democratic citizenship. The public service derives its true meaning from its mandate to serve citizens to advance the public good. This is the raison d'être of the institution, the source of motivation and pride of all those who choose to make it their life, whether for a season or for an entire career.

== Main features ==
These are:

1. Citizen's empowerment: One of the key components of new public management is citizen empowerment. NPA ensures the citizen's freedom of choice. It ensures quality services to citizens. Healthy competition in the service and product sectors allows citizens to choose their services and products according to their needs and choices.
2. Services for managerial support: The primary goal of managerial support services is to guarantee the level of service provided to citizens. The best talent available on the market is therefore attracted by attractive pay, incentives, and other benefits. NPA consistently recommends skill-improving programs to achieve the best results.
3. Structural changes in administration: The new public administration approach calls for small, flexible and less hierarchical structures In administration so that the citizens administration interface could become more flexible and comfortable. The organizational structure should be in line with the socially relevant conditions.
4. Multi-disciplinary nature of public administration: Knowledge from several disciplines and not just one dominating paradigm build the discipline of public administration. The political, social, economic, management and human relation approaches are needed to ensure the growth of discipline.
5. Politics-administration dichotomy: Since administrators today are involved in policy formulation and policy implementation at all the stages. Dichotomy meaning "a division or contrast between two things that are or are represented as being opposed or entirely different".
6. Awareness: Bring attention to the works of a public administration and the task that public administrators carry out for the community and for the government. Jobs of Public Administrators affect communities and large numbers of people. The importance of the job should be highlighted.
7. Case studies: Case studies help public administrators highlight situations and events where policies were not carried out as they should be. They set an example for what to do and what not to do. Case studies are a basic way to break down events in order to learn from other people's mistakes and the effects those mistakes have had on the community. With public administration being a job devoted to the people; it is an obvious way to see the reality of the work you do in the community. While there are many cases where policies were not carried out as planned. There are also plenty of examples of executed policies that have benefited communities, and those are important to look at as well.
8. Structure change: Public administration is moving in many different directions, it is more often called public management now. This is because the job is moving towards a direction of not only implementing policy to people but also managing policies as it trickles down through the law process, so that it is realistic for communities and the people in them.
9. Jack of all trades: The best public administrator tends to be someone who has knowledge in politics and law, but also has a hand in community functions. This allows for a smooth transition from policy to implementation.
10. Change: With the changes in the world, the job of public administration has changed. The job may be the same, but titles like public manager and public adviser have replaced the title public administrator.

== Themes ==
Relevance
Traditional public administration has too little interest in contemporary problems and issues. Social realities must be taken into consideration. For example, people should see changes as relevant. This means that changes should be specific to the needs of the area and the need of the people. Earlier approaches to NPA considered that rationality of the people was neglected. NPA suggests the inclusion of rationality of the people too in the process of policy formulation and validation.
Values
Value-neutrality in public administration is an impossibility. The values being served through administrative action must be transparent. To practice transparency in public administration is to ensure citizens the availability of information which is deemed public. This should be an organizational goal, and is to be taken into account when conducting all public business regardless of one's job title. If the goal of an organization is to serve the citizens to the best of their ability, then avoiding or failing to achieve transparency would cause significant damage to the relationship between them and the people they are aiming to serve.
Social equity
Realization of social equity should be a chief goal of public administration.
Change
Skepticism toward the deeply rooted powers invested in permanent institutions and the status quo. Operational flexibility and organizational adaptability to meet the environmental changes should be in-built in the administrative system.
Client focus
Positive, proactive, and responsive administrators rather than inaccessible and authoritarian "ivory tower" bureaucrats.
Management-worker relations
There should be equal emphasis both on efficiency and humane considerations. The new approach has to satisfy both the efficiency and the human relations criterion in order to achieve success.

NPA provides solutions for achieving these goals, popularly called the 4 Ds: decentralization, debureaucratization, delegation and democratization.

== Criticism ==
Though new public administration brought public administration closer to political science, it was criticized as anti-theoretic and anti-management. Robert T. Golembiewski describes it as radicalism in words and status quo in skills and technologies. Further, it must be counted as only a cruel reminder of the gap in the field between aspiration and performance. Golembiewski considers it as a temporary and transitional phenomena. In other words, the solutions for achieving the goals and anti-goals were not provided by the NPA scholars explicitly. Secondly, how much should one decentralize or delegate or debureaucratize or democratize in order to achieve the goals? On this front NPA is totally silent.

As said in A New Synthesis of Public Administration, governments have always been called upon to make difficult decisions, undertake complicated initiatives and face complex problems characteristical of the period. This is not in dispute. Nonetheless, the current circumstances are to determine what can be handled in the traditional way and what must be done differently.

Governments have always been called upon to face difficult problems. Setting priorities and making choices have always been difficult. For example, eliminating a sizable deficit is "merely" a difficult problem, although it is hard to believe when one is in the middle of such a heart-wrenching exercise. This entails making choices among equally deserving public purposes and making tough decisions about what should be preserved for the future. It requires reconciling future needs with what could garner a sufficient degree of public support in the short term to move forward. Academic public administration has lagged considerably behind practicing public administration. Improved curricula and a refocusing of emphasis upon the policy dynamics of government administration will be important factors in enticing more students to the study of Public Administration. It is more important to increase the number and improving the geographic spread of universities with public affairs programs, integrating public affairs components into the curricula of other graduate and professional programs, developing many more in-service, mid-career educational programs for public servants, and utilizing existing resources to strengthen public affairs programs.

The motives behind the promotion of New Public Administration is also in question in the case of Hong Kong. As Anthony Cheung argues, officials often employed the rhetoric of New Public Administration to roll back public expenditure and decrease welfare provision in the 1990s. Governors at that time used the excuse of administrative efficiency to curtail the power of the bureaucracy.

== Significance ==
Felix A. Nigro and Lloyd Nigro observe that New Public Administration has seriously jolted the traditional concepts and outlook of the discipline and enriched the subject by imparting a wider perspective by linking it closely to the society. The overall focus in NPA movement seems to be to make administration less "generic" and more "public", less "descriptive" and more "prescriptive", less "institution-oriented" and more "client-oriented", less "neutral" and more "normative" but should be no less scientific all the same.

== Discipline of public administration ==
- The broader field of administration includes Public Administration as a subset. It is just considered bureaucracy, disregarding the fact that bureaucracy is a specific organizational form present in both private and public sectors of organizations (Dhameja, 2003, p. 2). The discipline of public administration is focused on organizing, developing, and carrying out public policies for the benefit of the populace. It operates within a political framework to achieve the aims and objectives that are developed by political decision-makers. Therefore, public bureaucracy is the main focus of public administration. The subject gained significant momentum following the 1968 Minnowbrook conference, which was chaired by Dwight Waldo and held at Syracuse University. This is when the idea of "New Public Administration" first surfaced. In current culture, Public Administration is important as a path of government activity pertaining to public policy. It refers to the acts or inactions of the government on particular matters, connected to officially sanctioned policy objectives, methods, and the rules and procedures of implementing agencies. Public policy shapes the relationship between the goals of the government (Public Administration) and the actual results. As a result, the main goal of public policy is to achieve particular goals set forth by the government, with a primary emphasis on the welfare of the populace. The opinions of the general population have a significant impact on the direction and execution of government programs.
