= Erez Manela =

Israeli historian

- Born: Haifa, Israel

Academic background
- Education: Hebrew University of Jerusalem (BA); Yale University (PhD)
- Doctoral advisor: John Lewis Gaddis

Academic work
- Discipline: History; international relations
- Institutions: Harvard University

Erez Manela is an Israeli-American historian and professor. He is the Francis Lee Higginson Professor of History at Harvard University, as well as a director of graduate student programs at the Weatherhead Center for International Affairs. He is an expert in American foreign policy in the twentieth century and Wilsonianism.

== Biography ==
Manela was born and raised in Haifa. He attended the Hebrew University of Jerusalem, where he studied Middle Eastern studies and East Asian studies. After receiving his bachelor's degree, he received a Ph.D. in history from Yale University, where he studied under John Lewis Gaddis, Paul Kennedy, and Jonathan Spence.

He joined the history faculty at Harvard University in 2003. In 2007, Manela published The Wilsonian Moment, which reframed Wilsonianism in the context of independence movements across Europe and Asia.

== Bibliography ==
- The Wilsonian Moment: Self-Determination and the International Origins of Anticolonial Nationalism (Oxford University Press, 2007)
- ed. The Shock of the Global: The 1970s in Perspective (Harvard University Press, 2010)
- ed. Empires at War, 1911-1923 (Oxford University Press, 2014)
- ed. The Development Century: A Global History (Cambridge University Press, 2018)
- ed. The Anticolonial Transnational: Imaginaries, Mobilities, and Networks in the Struggle against Empire (Cambridge University Press, 2023)
