= Administrative discretion =

In public administration, administrative discretion refers to the flexible exercising of judgment and decision making allowed to public administrators. Regulatory agencies have the power to exercise this type of discretion in their day-to-day activities, and there have been cases where regulatory agencies have abused this power. Administrative law can help these agencies get on the path of following regulations, serve the public, and in turn, a reflection of the public's values and beliefs.

There is a need for administrative law because the interest of public could be at risk if various agencies were not following laws and regulations. Administrative law is important because without it, it could lead to arbitrary and unreasonable use of such discretion, which may lead to destruction of basic principles of administrative law. Although this type of discretion isn't laid out in the job-description of a bureaucrat/public servant, it is necessary because citizens use these bureaucratic institutions every day; such as the D.M.V., public schooling, and numerous others. Street-level bureaucrats have to deal with the provision of service as well as translating vaguely worded mandates into specific cohesive and comprehensive language to organize protocol.

Administrative discretion allows agencies to use professional expertise and judgment when making decisions or performing official duties, as opposed to only adhering to strict regulations or statuses. For example, a public official has administrative discretion when he or she has the freedom to make a choice among potential courses of action. The failure to exercise reasonable judgment or discretion is abuse of discretion.

"I think that in our system of government, where law ends, tyranny need not begin. Where law ends, discretion begins, and the exercise of discretion may mean either beneficence or tyranny, either justice or injustice, either reasonableness or arbitrariness."—Kenneth Culp Davis

== History ==
The idea of administrative discretion dates back as far as the time of widely known Greek philosopher Socrates in his quest to lay the foundation for philosophical ethics. Socrates determined a general ranking of "universal morals" in order to piece together certain criterion that could test what course of action to take in any immediate situation. He assigned value orders as well as certain "means to ends" that would determine alternatives for ethical philosophical generalization. In doing so, Socrates was creating the first type of basis for administrative discretion.

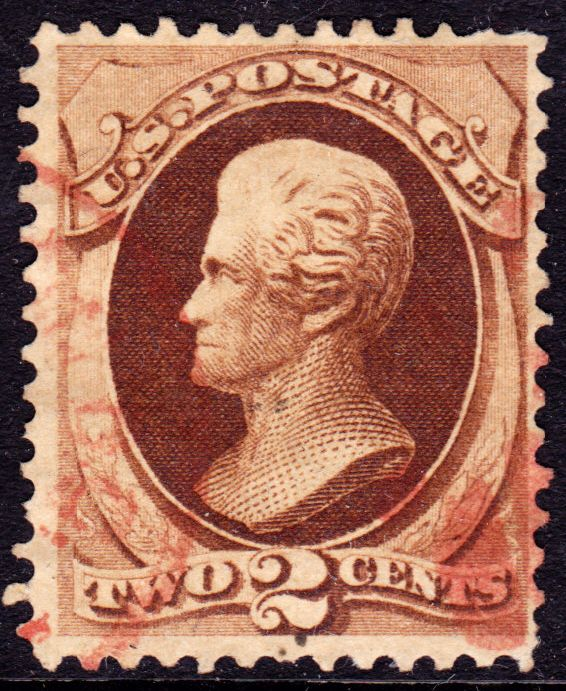
Andrew Jackson 1873 Postage Stamp—US Postal Service

When Andrew Jackson took office in 1829, the country was going through radical changes—the scale of government grew extensively which caused the need for an increase in the administrative activity. Jackson brought the bureaucratization of administration. He appointed his close friends to office to work in administered processes. This was known as the "spoils system", in which was a system was in place where presidential administrations had the power of hiring or firing federal workers; this brought a constant change in demands and routines for personnel. Of his additions to the administrative discretion and of bureaucracy as we know it today, one in particular, the creation of The Patent Reform Act of 1836 brought about the creation of new offices and adjudicatory administrative boards. Although, perhaps unknowingly, Jackson brought a new age to administrative discretion. Another president who has come in contact with administrative discretion is Madison. Known as Madison's Managers, drafted in 1787, some argue that early public administration literature had it right.

After Jackson, many presidents followed suit of his example—appointing members to administrative processes. In some cases, officials appointed by the presidents abused their powers in administration. There were attempts to control administrative discretion throughout the 19th century, but those attempts overall, failed. Political appointees believed they indeed were law themselves—Jesse Hoyt and his successor Samuel Swartwout for example, notoriously did not comply with the rule to return funds they had collected on behalf of the Federal Government. However, within the 20th century, substantial changes occurred that better formed the concept of administrative discretion as we know it today.

Franklin Roosevelt's New Deal brought much needed relief to the public by implementing welfare programs in a dire time of crisis. There was a type of bureaucratic "sprawl": this era saw the creation of numerous agencies and boards. The birth of such a large bureaucracy, not only helped in aiding the public, but Roosevelt's programs also answered important question of who would be part of the bureaucracy and govern future welfare programs. The New Deal emphasized the importance of administrative discretion in government and their processes by expanding the staff of the White House and creating new managerial techniques for the executive.

The Administrative Procedure Act of 1946 was created to govern the internal procedures of administrative agencies and how those agencies interact with the public. The act came about after the Attorney General appointed a committee to investigate the need for procedural reform. The notion of the time (not too far off-base of popular public notion today) was that various agencies were created by Congress over a long period of time in a piece-mail, haphazard manner. The view was that there was no uniformity in the chaotic bodies to administer anything. The 1946 act places policies on agencies' rule-making, adjudications, and licensing behavior. The intention was to make sure that the public is protected and safe, with secured proper entitlements.

== Examples of administrative discretion in law ==
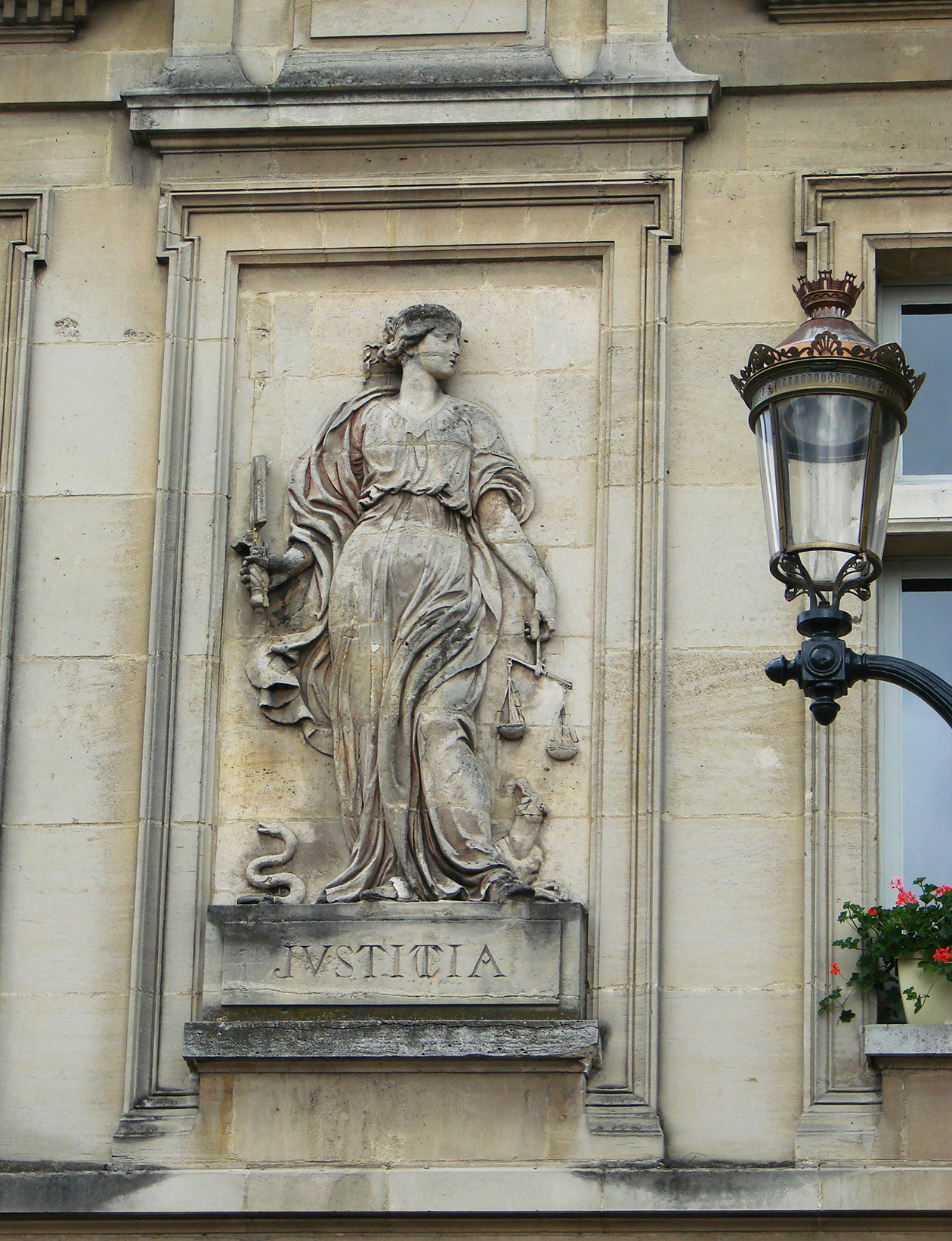
Compiègne Justice

Goldberg v. Kelly—In this 1970 case, City officials were administrating and terminating public assistance benefits under the federally assisted program of Aid to Families with Dependent Children (AFDC) and/or under New York State's Home Relief Program in New York City. The problem arose as residents receiving financial aid claimed that the New York City officials overseeing and administering these programs terminated their aid without notifying them or holding a hearing. Recipients alleged that this was unconstitutional on the Administration's part because it denying them due process of law guaranteed under the Due Process Clause in the Fourteenth Amendment (Case Briefs). In this case, Administrative Discretion resulted in individualized parameters of what was deemed necessary to convey a termination of aid, instead of a federal standard. The Holding of Chief Justice Warren Burger and the court sided with the appellants' view: a full hearing of evidence is required before a recipient can be denied/deprived of certain types of government benefits. In other words, a recipient must receive some sort of notice should their aid be changed/terminated; whether in writing or orally.

Industrial Union Department v. American Petroleum Institute--In this 1980 case, Under the Occupational Safety and Health Act of 1970 (or OSHA), The Secretary of Labor was required to explicitly state exposure risks/limits at the lowest level of carcinogens that would not impair viability of the industries regulated. However, this failed to happen. The Secretary did not say or record anywhere that exposure to the substance benzene at 10 ppm (parts per million) would cause leukemia and exposure to 1 ppm would not (Oyez cases). The holding of the Supreme Court, under Justice Warren Burger, concluded that there was a statute for a requirement of significant risk, and the Secretary and agency had failed to apply the act inappropriately. In this case, Administrative Discretion under the Secretary of Labor had not correctly interpreted the "extent feasible".

Citizens To Preserve Overton Park, Inc. v Volpe--In this 1971 case, in Memphis, Tennessee, a group of citizens claimed that The Secretary of Transportation made the decision to have construction of a highway where Overton Park was located and violated statutes enacted by the congress. The court holding under justice Burger upheld the "feasible and prudent" clause: wherein an alternative exists to circumvent building the proposed highway through the park. Furthermore, the Secretary's decision to use federal money for the highway did not comply with the Department of Transportation Act of 1966.

The IRS Tea Party Controversy: The IRS must exercise discretion in administering the tax law. The IRS oversees a vast system that affects nearly everyone. Since the law is complex and often difficult to interpret, the IRS must draw fine lines in order to properly interpret, apply, and enforce the law. The IRS claims it gave extra scrutiny to Tea Party-affiliated groups based solely on the name and goals of the groups. The IRS asked those groups invasive questions that were not normally asked of other groups: about their donor lists, affiliations and contacts with the media .

Administrative Discretion in Criminal Law Enforcement-- When a government official of law enforcement uses their own sense of ethical discretion such as not to or to invoke in criminal process. There are two major situational motivations of police discretion; whether police response is internally invoked or citizen initiated and whether it is a law enforcement of order maintenance situation. The two situational motivations combine to create four types of discretionary situations for law enforcement officials. The four different situations are proactive and reactive law enforcement and proactive and reactive order maintenance.

== Modern day administrative discretion ==
In today's administrative discretion, some issues affect the way organizations function and the way the public feels towards administrations/agencies as a whole. In this way public administrators are seen as "moral agents"; they are given the task to exercise discretion, and reflect the society's values. In theory, the public expects administrators to be the exemplary role models of society and follow laws and regulations.

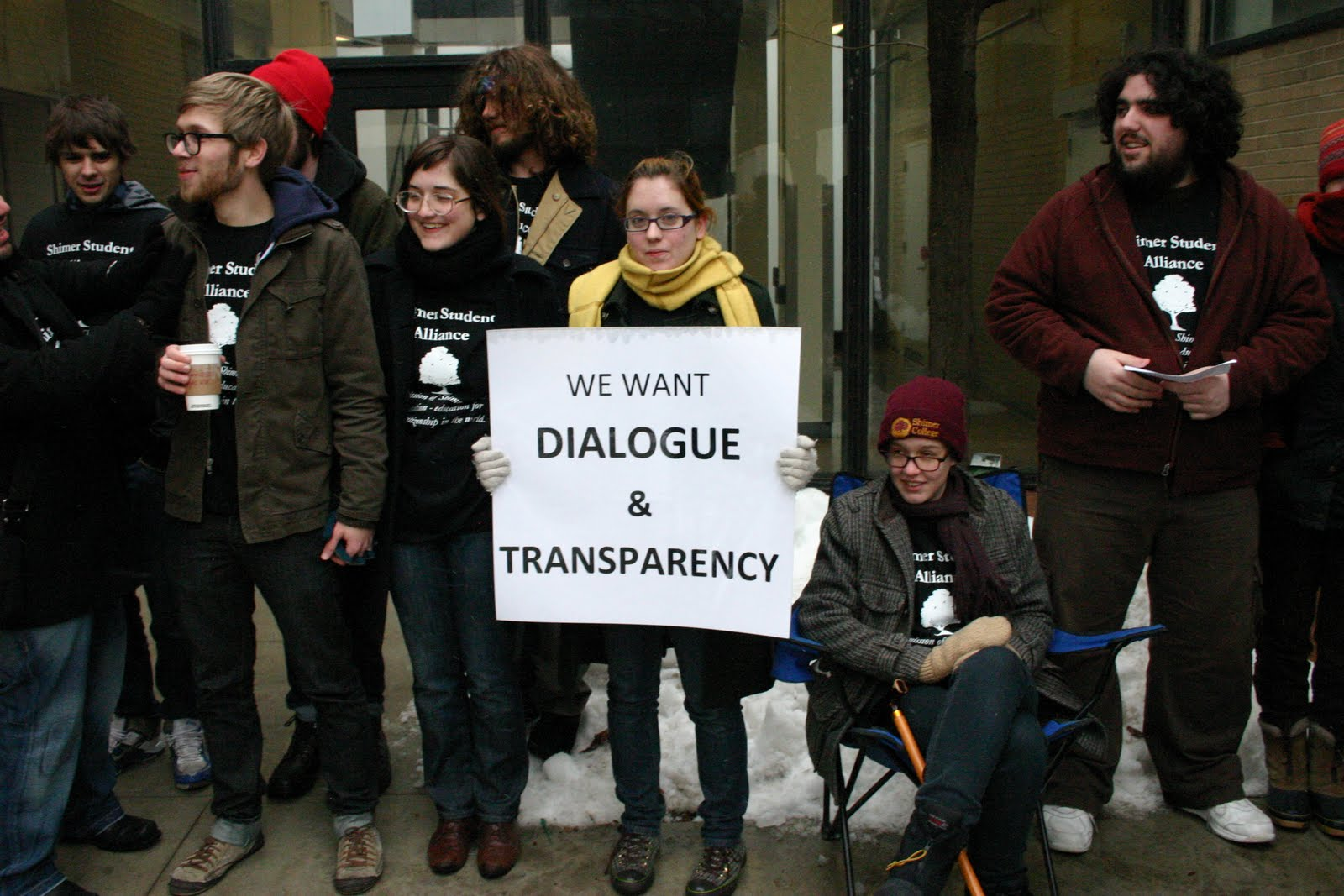
Shimer College dialogue transparency 2010 "We want dialogue and transparency."

In reality, some do not think the administrators play fair and the public feels distrusts towards them. In a poll done by Gallup.com, the public showed an increase in the mistrust in government. People were asked if corruption was widespread throughout the government. The results recorded from 2006 to 2013 rose significantly; from 56% to 79%. The public may know little to nothing about the administration or their responsibilities, yet approval is very low. The lack of transparency can mean that an administration is not completely honest, secretly keeping hidden agendas: withholding information from public view. It can also simply mean that the administration does not attempt to make their information easy to access or understand for the public(regutoraly).
