= Politics-administration dichotomy =

Theory in public administration

The politics-administration dichotomy is a theory that constructs the boundaries of public administration and asserts the normative relationship between elected officials and administrators in a democratic society. The phrase politics-administration dichotomy was first found in public administration literature from the 1940s.

== History ==
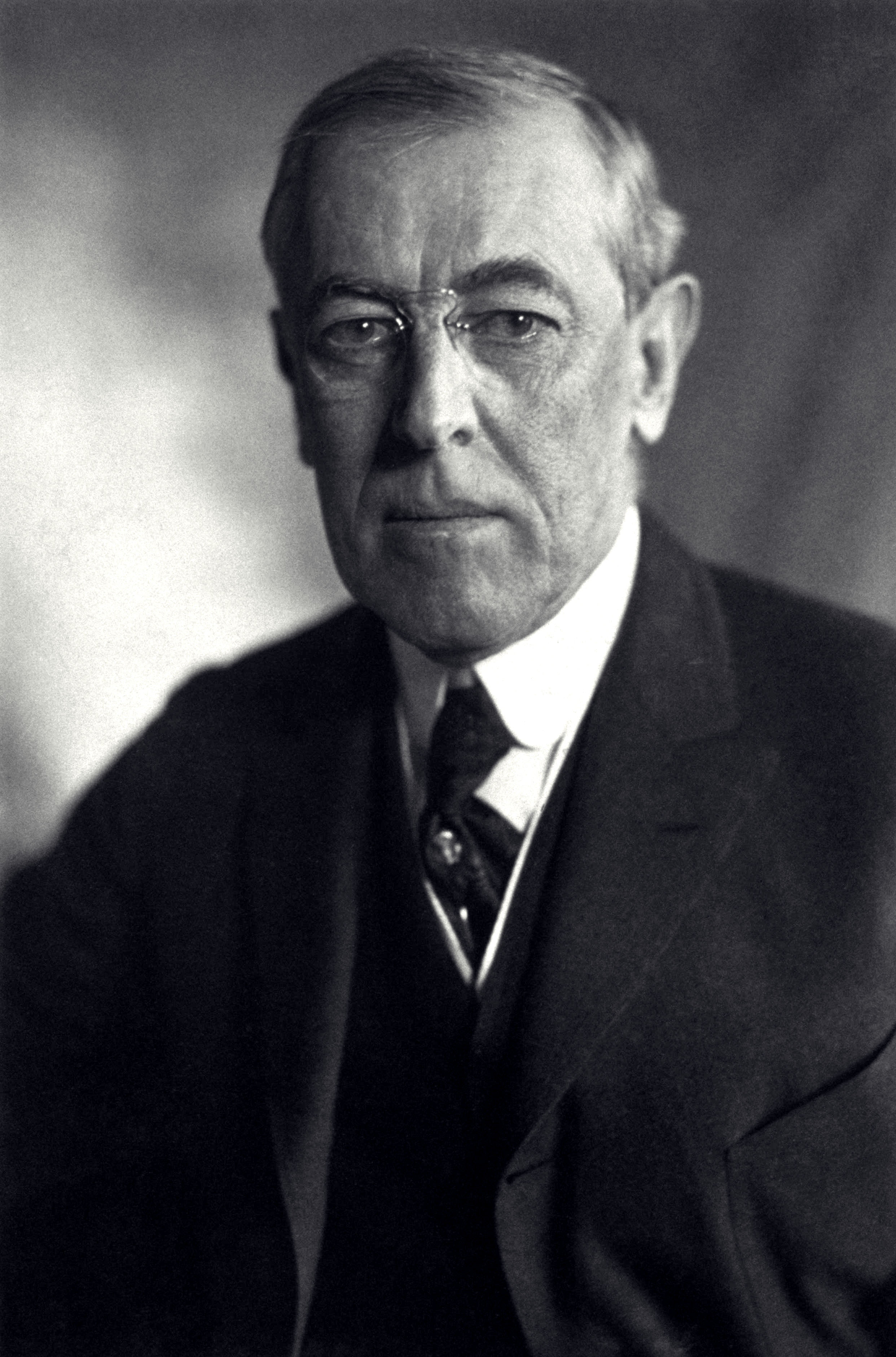
Portrait of Woodrow Wilson 1919

Woodrow Wilson is credited with the politics-administration dichotomy via his theories on public administration in his 1887 essay, "The Study of Administration". Wilson came up with a theory that politics and administration are inherently different and should be approached as such. Wilson wrote in his essay in regards to public administration: “The field of administration is a field of business. It is removed from the hurry and strife of politics... Administration lies outside the proper sphere of politics. Administrative questions are not political questions. Although politics sets the tasks for administration, it should not be suffered to manipulate its offices.” With these words, Wilson started a debate that has been going on for decades and continues to this day. The politics-administration dichotomy is an important concept in the field of public administration and shows no signs of going away because it deals with the policy-maker's role as an administrator and the balancing act that is the relationship between politics and administration. This essay is considered to be the first source to be analyzed and studied in the public administration field. Wilson was primarily influenced by Richard Ely and Herbert Adams who taught at Johns Hopkins University.

== Perceived Advantages ==
Woodrow Wilson's politics-administration dichotomy can potentially be substantial in sustaining a strong productive government. The complexity, difficulty level and ample multiplication of governmental functions can be seen as a main component in the cause to implement the politics-administration dichotomy. Due to Wilson's lack of faith in republican self-government and the overwhelming amount of “selfish, ignorant, timid, stubborn, or foolish” persons whom the “bulk of can vote,” this model provides a solution that would counteract the majority of the incumbent voters. By employing the elite philosophical leaders to improve, shape, condition and sway public opinion, politics-administration dichotomy, if carried out in an unselfish manner leaves little to no room for error.

Woodrow Wilson's model created one of the first concepts of checks and balances, which is one of the most predominant systems of democratic accountability used to shape the United States government. Nevertheless, “separating the will of the people from politics” could be extremely beneficial and institutionally separating administration from politics could prove valuable in sustaining government accountability. The politics-administration dichotomy also leads to political neutrality. The blurring of "politics" and "policy" has cause to the advocations to dismiss "partisan politics" rather than "policy politics." The importance of neutrality in politics and policy are established within the politics-administration dichotomy.

== Criticism ==
One criticism of the politics-administration dichotomy is that the standard definition is too narrow. If politics includes all of what we know as policy making, then the dichotomy would bar administrators, presumably including city managers, from participation. The dichotomy of policy and administration was a conceptual distinction underlying a theory of democratic accountability. It was not intended to guide behavior; it was intended as a behavioral prescription directed against contemporary practices of machine politics. The strict definition is the model. It is not conceptually possible to have a one way dichotomy that keeps elected official out of administration but allows administrators to be active in policy. The dichotomy model standing alone is an aberration.

Arguably the father of American political administration, Wilson, in his essay 'The Study of Administration', suggested that in order to have objectivity and progress, the administration must be separate from politics ... The political/administration dichotomy aimed to separate the power between political leaders and the merit-based appointment of professional permanent civil servants in the administrative state ... At the turn of the 20th century, the field focused on making the bureaucracy more effective ... The field’s basic premise was to take a business-like approach to government and its activities.

By Wilson making the statement, "government should be run like a business," he thereby opened up many loopholes for the capitalist society to exploit the government for things they didn't actually have. This statement ends in a very dangerous uncharted territory for people now based on the fact government could be run like a business. The concept "everyone has a boss" with creating the business-like mindset running our country makes it so everyone have to answer to someone (higher on the totem pole) than the other. It creates a sense of working for your job when you are supposed to be working for the people whom you represent. So now, instead of implementing policy to help the people, administrators and politicians are more concerned about who is funding/appointing themselves than they are about the common man. That isn't just the biggest problem of the politics-administration dichotomy, it is a huge problem for the sustainability of our government and the world.

== Key People ==
- Woodrow Wilson
