= Public administration =

Academic discipline; implementation or management of policy

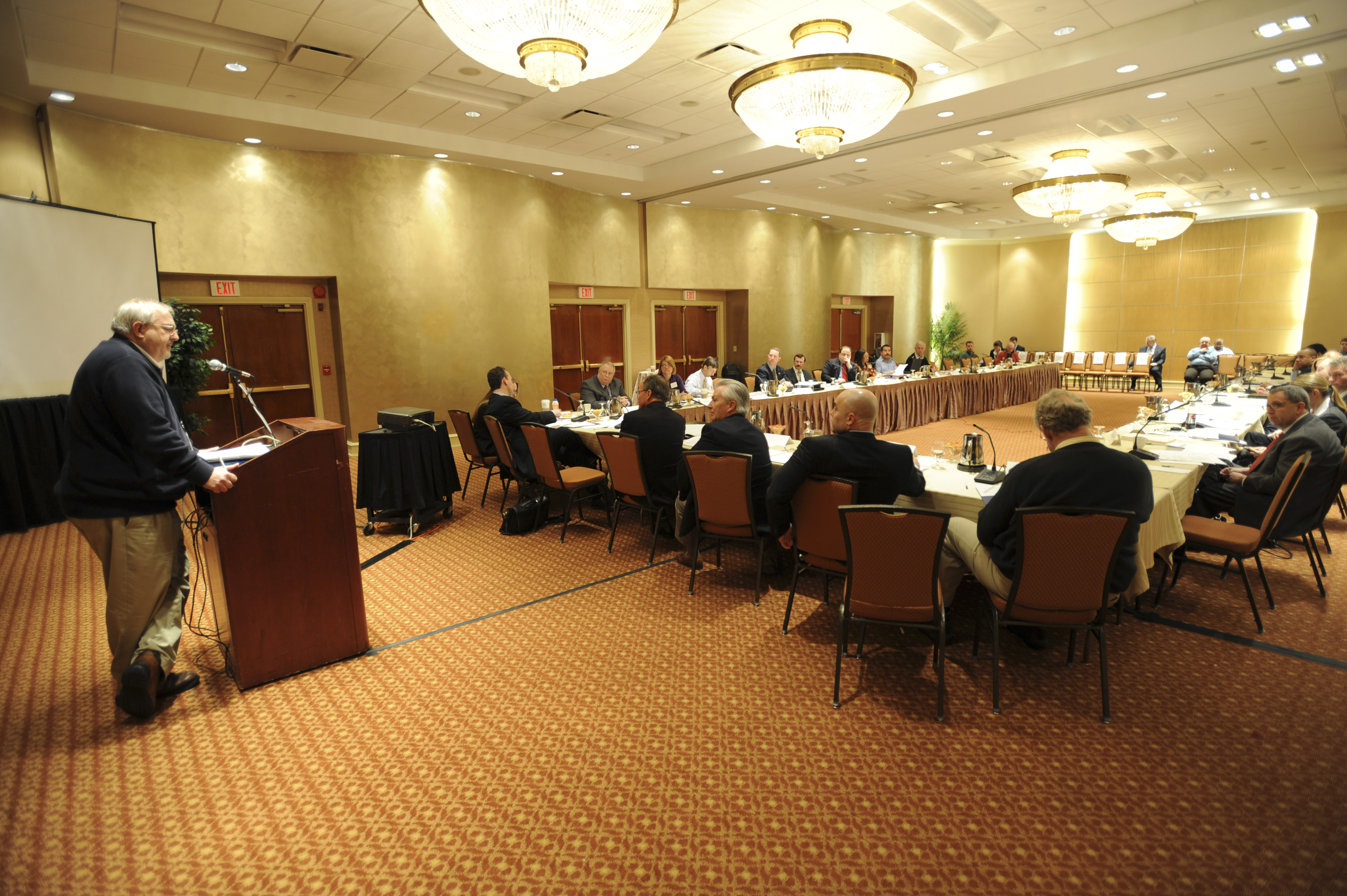
Public administration is both an academic discipline and a field of practice; the latter is depicted in this picture of U.S. federal public servants at a meeting.

Public administration, also known as public policy and administration or public management, is the implementation of public policies, which are sets of proposed or decided actions to solve problems and address relevant social and economic issues. It is closely related to public policy and political science.

This implementation generally occurs through the administration of government programs in the public sector, but also through the management of non-profit organizations in the community sector, and/or businesses in the private sector that provide goods and services to the government through public-private partnerships and government procurement. It has also been characterized as the "translation of politics into the reality that citizens experience every day."

In an academic context, public administration has been described as the study of government decision-making; the analysis of policies and the inputs that have produced them, as well as those necessary to produce alternative policies. It is also a subfield of political science taught in public policy schools where studies of policy processes and the structures, functions, and behavior of public institutions and their relationships with broader society take place. The study and application of public administration is founded on the principle that the proper functioning of an organization or institution relies on effective management. In contemporary literature, it is also recognized as applicable to private businesses and nonprofit organizations.

The mid-twentieth century saw the rise of German sociologist Max Weber's theory of bureaucracy, bringing about a substantive interest in the theoretical aspects of public administration.

== Definitions ==
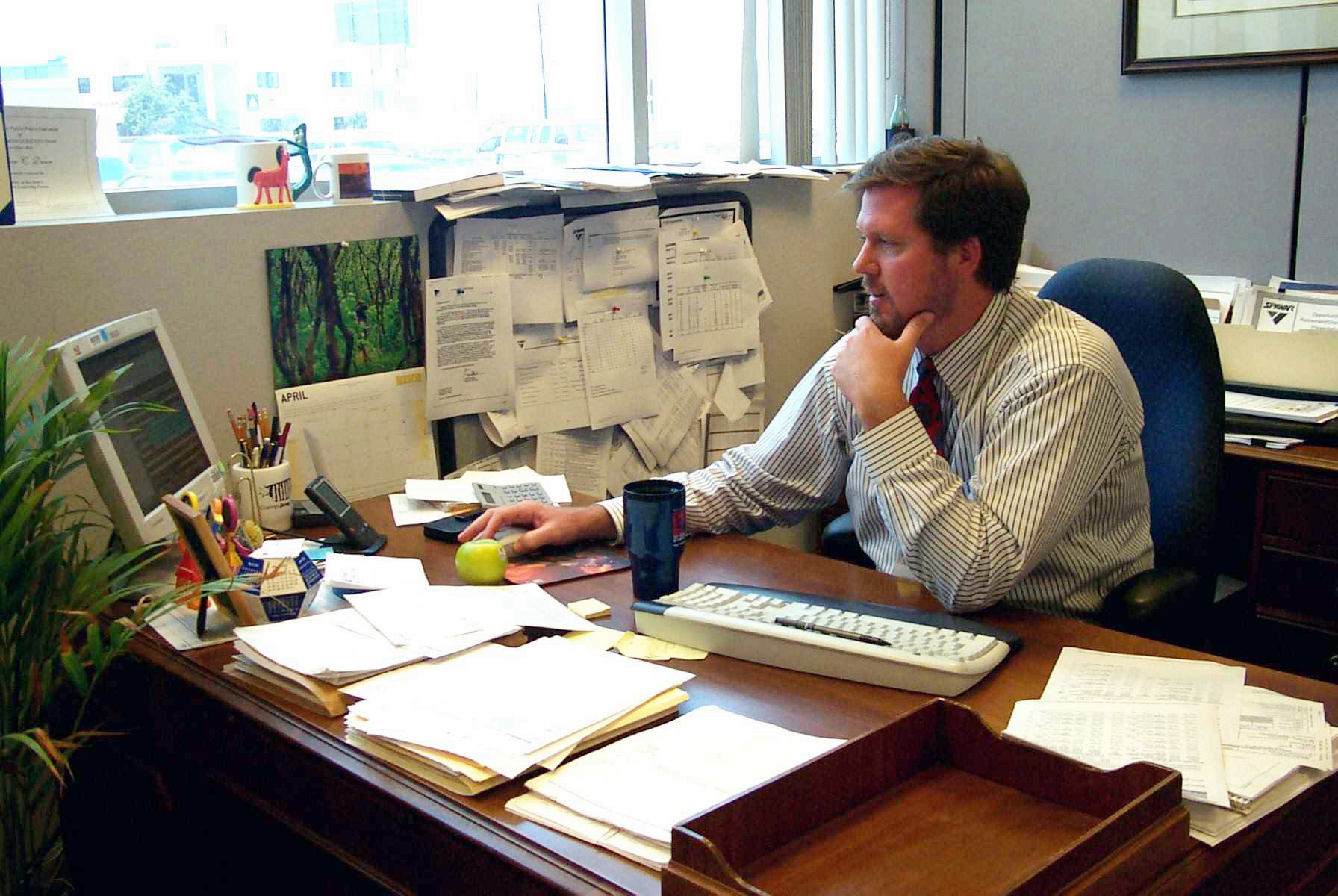
Administrators tend to work with both paper documents and computer files: "There has been a significant shift from paper to electronic records during the past two decades." Pictured here is Stephen C. Dunn, Deputy Comptroller for the US Navy.

In 1947, Paul H. Appleby defined public administration as the "public leadership of public affairs directly responsible for executive action." In democracies, it usually has to do with leadership and executive action that respect and contribute to the dignity, worth, and potential of the citizen. One year later, Gordon Clapp, then Chairman of the Tennessee Valley Authority, defined public administration "as a public instrument whereby democratic society may be more completely realized." This implies that it must relate itself to concepts of justice, liberty, and fuller economic opportunity for human beings and is thus concerned with "people, with ideas, and with things". James D. Carroll and Alfred M. Zuck called Woodrow Wilson's publication of his essay, "The Study of Administration", "the beginning of public administration as a specific and influential field of study."

More recently, scholars claim that "public administration has no generally accepted definition" because the "scope of the subject is so great and so debatable that it is easier to explain than define." Public administration is a field of study (i.e., a discipline) and an occupation. There is much disagreement about whether the study of public administration can properly be called a discipline, largely because of the debate over whether it is a subfield of political science or of administrative science, the latter an outgrowth of its roots in policy analysis and evaluation research. Scholar Donald F. Kettl is among those who view public administration "as a sub-field within political science." According to Lalor, a society with a public authority that provides at least one public good can be said to have a public administration. In contrast, the absence of either (or a fortiori both) a public authority or the provision of at least one public good implies the absence of a public administration. He argues that public administration is the public provision of public goods, in which the demand function is satisfied more or less effectively by politics, whose primary tool is rhetoric. The supply function is more or less efficiently satisfied by public management, whose primary tools are speech acts and the production of public goods. The moral purpose of public administration, implicit in its acceptance of its role, is the maximization of the opportunities of the public to satisfy its wants.

The North American Industry Classification System definition of the Public Administration sector (NAICS 91) states that public administration "... comprises establishments primarily engaged in activities of a governmental nature, that is, the enactment and judicial interpretation of laws and their pursuant regulations, and the administration of programs based on them." This includes "legislative activities, taxation, national defense, public order and safety, immigration services, foreign affairs and international assistance, and the administration of government programs are activities that are purely governmental in nature."

== History ==
=== Antiquity ===
Dating back to antiquity, states have required officials like pages, treasurers, and tax collectors to administer the practical business of government. Before the 19th century, the staffing of most public administrations was rife with nepotism, favoritism, and political patronage, which was often referred to as a "spoils system".

==== Ancient India ====
The Harappa and Mohenjo-daro civilizations had organized bodies of public servants, suggesting the presence of some form of public administration. Numerous references exist to Brihaspati's contributions to laws and governance. An excerpt from Ain-i-Akbari [vol.III, tr. by H. S. Barrett, p. 217–218], written by Abu'l-Fazl ibn Mubarak, mentions a symposium of philosophers from various faiths held in 1578 at Akbar's instance. It is believed that some Charvaka thinkers may have participated in the symposium. In "Naastika", Fazl refers to the Charvaka law-makers, emphasizing "good work, judicious administration, and welfare schemes". Somadeva also describes the Charvaka method of defeating the nation's enemies, referring to thirteen disguised enemies in the kingdom with selfish interests who should not be spared. Kautilya presents a detailed scheme to remove the enemies in the guise of friends. The Charvaka stalwart, Brihaspati, is more ancient than Kautilya and Somadeva. He appears to have been contemporaneous with the Harappa and Mohenjo-daro cultures.

Archaeological evidence regarding kings, priests, and palaces in the Harappa and Mohenjo-Daro excavations is limited. However, the presence of complex civilization and public facilities such as granaries and bathhouses, along with the existence of large cities, indicates the likelihood of centralized governance. The uniformity of the artifacts and brick sizes suggests some form of centralized governance. Although speculation regarding social hierarchies and class structures is plausible, the absence of discernible elite burial sites also suggests that most citizens were almost equal in status.

==== Ancient China ====
The field of management may have originated in ancient China, including, possibly, the first highly centralized bureaucratic state and the earliest (by the second century BC) example of a meritocracy based on civil service tests. In regards to public administration, China was considered to be "advanced" compared to the rest of the world up until the end of the 18th century.

Though Chinese administration cannot be traced to any one individual, figures of the Fa-Jia emphasizing a merit system, like Shen Buhai (400–337 BCE), may have had the most influence, and could be considered its founders, if they are not valuable as rare pre-modern examples of the abstract theory of administration. Creel writes that, in Shen Buhai, there are the "seeds of the civil service examination", and that, if one wishes to exaggerate, it would "no doubt be possible to translate Shen Buhai's term Shu, or technique, as 'science'", and argue that he was the first political scientist, though Creel does "not care to go this far".

=== Medieval to 19th-century ===
Public administrators have long been the "eyes and ears" of rulers. In medieval times, the ability to read and write, as well as to add and subtract, was as dominated by the educated elite as public employment was. Consequently, the need for expert civil servants whose ability to read and write formed the basis for developing expertise in such necessary activities as legal record-keeping, paying and feeding armies, and levying taxes. As the European imperialist age progressed and the military powers extended their hold over other continents and people, the need for a sophisticated public administration grew.

In the 18th century, Frederick William I of Prussia established professorates in Cameralism to train a new class of public administrators. The universities of Frankfurt an der Oder and the University of Halle were Prussian institutions emphasizing economic and social disciplines, with the goal of societal reform. Johann Heinrich Gottlob Justi was a well-known professor of Cameralism.

The development of French bureaucracy, like that of the British, was influenced by the Chinese system. Voltaire claimed that the Chinese had "perfected moral science" and François Quesnay advocated an economic and political system modeled after that of the Chinese. French civil service examinations adopted in the late 19th century were also heavily based on general cultural studies. These features have been likened to the earlier Chinese model.

Thomas Taylor Meadows, the British consul in Guangzhou, argued in his Desultory Notes on the Government and People of China (1847) that "the long duration of the Chinese empire is solely and altogether owing to the good government which consists in the advancement of men of talent and merit only". Influenced by the ancient Chinese imperial examination, the Northcote–Trevelyan Report of 1854 recommended that recruitment should be based on merit determined through competitive examination, candidates should have a solid general education to enable inter-departmental transfers, and promotion should be through achievement rather than "preferment, patronage, or purchase". This led to implementation of Her Majesty's Civil Service as a systematic, meritocratic civil service bureaucracy.

Lorenz von Stein, a 1855 German professor from Vienna, is considered the founder of the science of public administration in many parts of the world. In the time of Von Stein, public administration was considered a form of administrative law, but Von Stein believed this concept was too restrictive. Von Stein taught that public administration relies on many pre-established disciplines such as sociology, political science, administrative law, and public finance. He called public administration an integrating science and stated that public administrators should be concerned with both theory and practice. He argued that public administration is a science because knowledge is generated and evaluated according to the scientific method.

=== United States ===
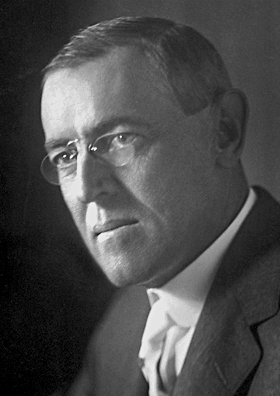
Woodrow Wilson

==== Foundations ====
The father of public administration in the US is considered to be Woodrow Wilson. He first formally recognized public administration in an 1887 article entitled "The Study of Administration". The future president wrote that "it is the object of administrative study to discover, first, what government can properly and successfully do, and, secondly, how it can do these proper things with the utmost possible efficiency and at the least possible cost either of money or energy."

By the 1920s, scholars of public administration had responded to Wilson's call, and textbooks in the field had been introduced. Distinguished scholars of that period include Luther Gulick, Lyndall Urwick, Henri Fayol, and Frederick Taylor. Taylor argued in The Principles of Scientific Management, that scientific analysis would lead to the discovery of the "[a] best way" to do things or carry out an operation. Taylor's technique was introduced to private industrialists, and later to various government organizations.

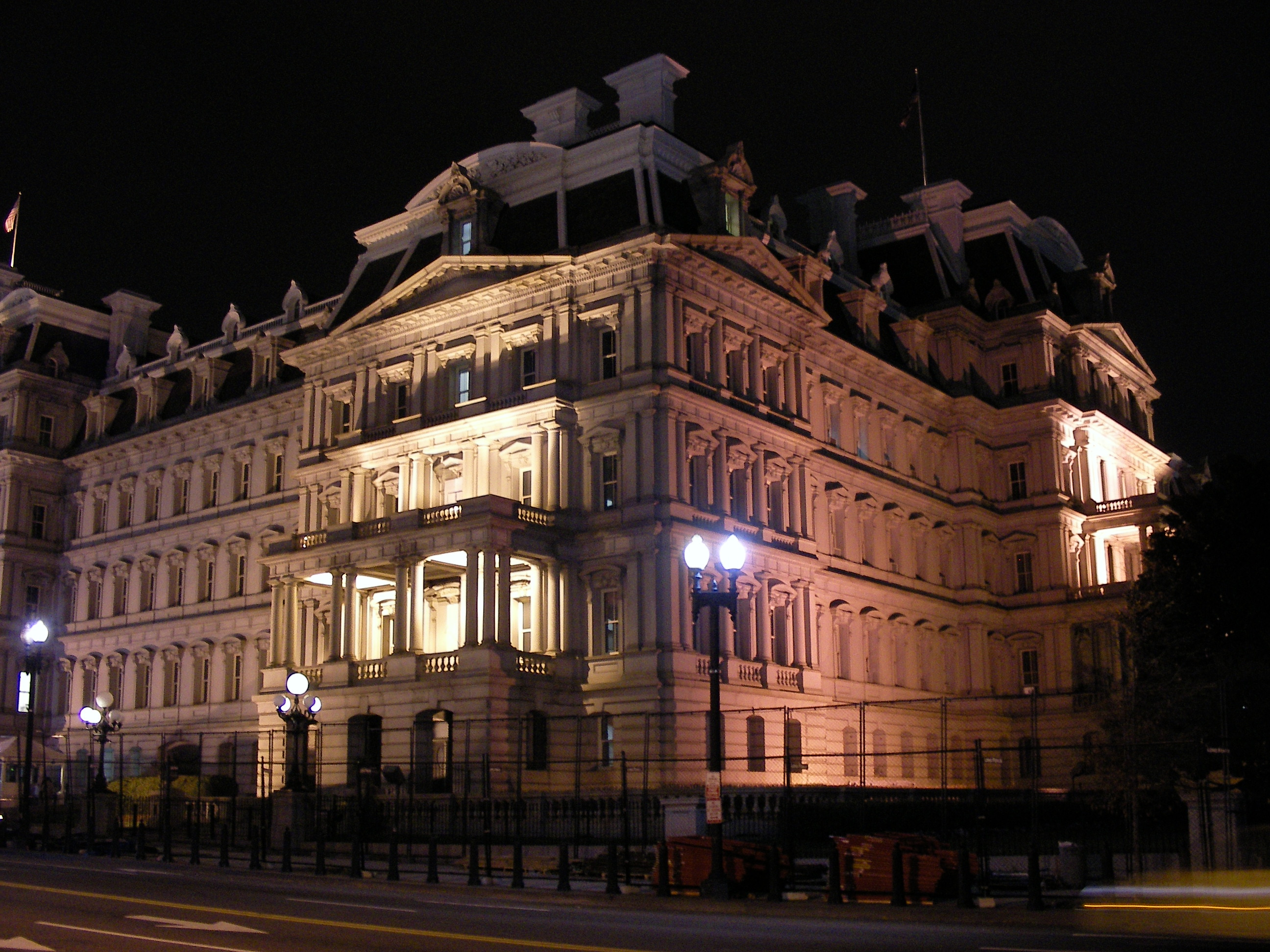
The Eisenhower Executive Office Building at night

In 1937, the Brownlow Committee, which was a presidentially commissioned panel of political science and public administration experts, recommended sweeping changes to the executive branch of the U.S. federal government, including the creation of the Executive Office of the President. Based on these recommendations, President Franklin D. Roosevelt lobbied Congress in 1939 to approve the Reorganization Act of 1939. The Act led to Reorganization Plan No. 1, which created the office, which reported directly to the president.

The American Society for Public Administration (ASPA), the leading professional group for public administration, was founded in 1939. ASPA sponsors the journal Public Administration Review, which was founded in 1940. The National Academy of Public Administration (NAPA) is a United States nonprofit, non-governmental, non-partisan organization. As a congressionally chartered national academy, its mission is to produce independent research and studies that advance the field of public administration and facilitate the development, adoption, and implementation of solutions to government's most significant challenges.

==== 1940s: Administrative theory ====
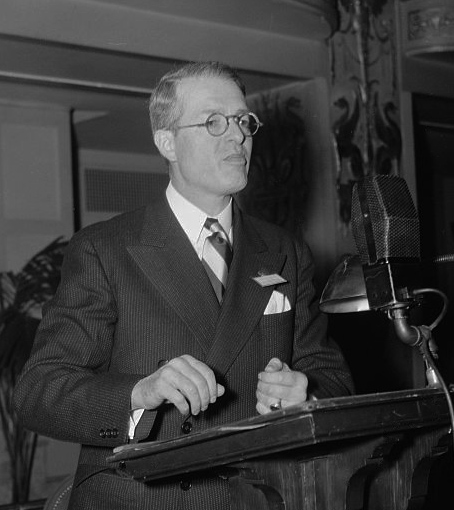
Luther Gulick (1892–1993) was an expert on public administration.

The separation of politics and administration advocated by Wilson continues to play a significant role in public administration today. However, the dominance of this dichotomy was challenged by second-generation scholars beginning in the 1940s. Luther Gulick's fact-value dichotomy was a key contender for Wilson's proposed politics-administration dichotomy. In place of Wilson's first-generation split, Gulick advocated a "seamless web of discretion and interaction".

Luther Gulick and Lyndall Urwick are two second-generation scholars. Gulick, Urwick, and the new generation of administrators built on the work of contemporary behavioral, administrative, and organizational scholars including Henri Fayol, Fredrick Winslow Taylor, Paul Appleby, Frank Goodnow, and Willam Willoughby. The new generation of organizational theories no longer relies on logical assumptions and generalizations about human nature, as do classical and enlightened theorists.

Gulick developed a comprehensive, generic theory of organization that emphasized the scientific method, efficiency, professionalism, structural reform, and executive control. Gulick summarized the duties of administrators with an acronym, POSDCORB, which stands for planning, organizing, staffing, directing, coordinating, reporting, and budgeting. Fayol developed a systematic, 14-point treatment of private management. Second-generation theorists drew upon private management practices for administrative sciences. A single, generic management theory that blurred the borders between the private and public sectors was thought to be possible. Within the general theory, administrative theory could focus on governmental organizations. The mid-1940s theorists challenged Wilson and Gulick. The politics-administration dichotomy remained the center of criticism.

==== 1950s–1970s: Expansion and reform ====
During the 1950s, the United States experienced prolonged prosperity and solidified its place as a world leader. Public administration experienced a kind of heyday due to the successful war effort and successful post-war reconstruction in Western Europe and Japan. The government was popular, as was President Eisenhower. In the 1960s and 1970s, the government itself came under fire as ineffective, inefficient, and largely a wasted effort. The costly Vietnam War and domestic scandals, including the bugging of Democratic Party headquarters (the 1974 Watergate scandal), are two examples of self-destructive government behavior that alienated citizens.

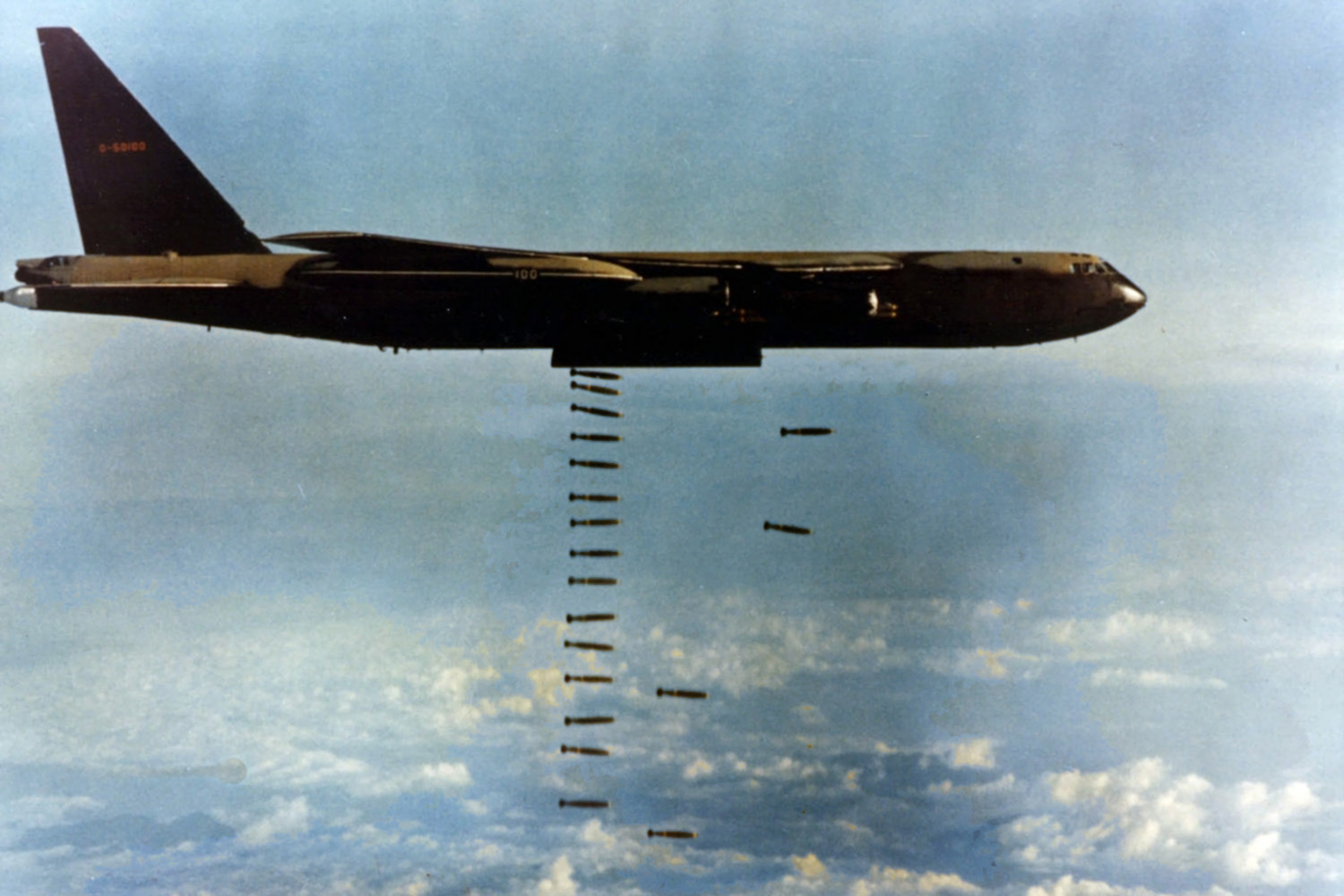
The costly Vietnam War alienated U.S. citizens from their government. Pictured is Operation Arc Light, a U.S. bombing operation.

There was a call by citizens for efficient administration to replace ineffective, wasteful bureaucracy. Public administration would have to distance itself from politics to answer this call and remain effective. Elected officials supported these reforms. The Hoover Commission, chaired by University of Chicago professor Louis Brownlow, examines the reorganization of government. Brownlow subsequently founded the Public Administration Service (PAS) at the university, an organization that provided consulting services to all levels of government until the 1970s.

Concurrently, after World War II, the entire concept of public administration expanded to include policymaking and analysis; thus, the study of "administrative policy making and analysis" was introduced and integrated into government decision-making bodies. Later on, the human factor became a predominant concern and a focus of emphasis in the study of public administration. This period witnessed the development and incorporation of knowledge from other social sciences, predominantly psychology, anthropology, and sociology, into the study of public administration (Jeong, 2007). Henceforth, the emergence of scholars such as Fritz Morstein Marx, with his book The Elements of Public Administration (1946), Paul H. Appleby Policy and Administration (1952), Frank Marini 'Towards a New Public Administration' (1971), and others that have contributed positively in these endeavors.

Stimulated by events during the 1960s such as an active civil rights movement, the Vietnam War and war protests, assassinations of a president and civil rights leaders, and an active women's movement, public administration changed course somewhat. Landmark legislation such as the Equal Pay Act of 1963 and the Civil Rights Act of 1964 also gave public administrators new responsibilities. These events were manifest in the public administration profession through the new public administration movement. "Under the stimulating patronage of Dwight Waldo, some of the best of the younger generation of scholars challenged the doctrine they had received". These new scholars demanded more policy-oriented public administrators that incorporated "four themes: relevance, values, equity, and change". All of these themes would encourage more participation among women and minorities. Stimulated by the events of the '60s, the 1970s brought significant change to the American Society for Public Administration. Racial and ethnic minorities and women members organized to seek greater participation. Eventually, the Conference on Minority Public Administrators and the Section for Women in Public Administration were established.

The 1968 Minnowbrook Conference, which convened at Syracuse University under the leadership of Dwight Waldo, gave rise to the concept of New Public Administration.

==== 1980s–1990s: Managerial reform ====
In the late 1980s, yet another generation of public administration theorists began to displace the last. The new theory, which came to be called New Public Management, was proposed by David Osborne and Ted Gaebler in their book Reinventing Government. The new model advocated the use of private sector-style models, organizational ideas and values to improve the efficiency and service-orientation of the public sector. During the Clinton Administration (1993–2001), Vice President Al Gore adopted and reformed federal agencies using NPM approaches. In the 1990s, new public management became prevalent throughout the bureaucracies of the US, the UK, and, to a lesser extent, in Canada. The original public management theories have roots attributed to policy analysis, according to Richard Elmore in his 1986 article published in the "Journal of Policy Analysis and Management".

Some modern authors define NPM as a combination of splitting large bureaucracies into smaller, more fragmented agencies; encouraging competition among public agencies and between public agencies and private firms; and using economic incentive lines (e.g., performance pay for senior executives or user-pay models). NPM treats individuals as "customers" or "clients" (in the private sector sense), rather than as citizens.

Some critics argue that the New Public Management concept of treating people as "customers" rather than "citizens" is an inappropriate borrowing from the private sector model, because businesses see customers as a means to an end (profit), rather than as the proprietors of government (the owners), opposed to merely the customers of a business (the patrons). In New Public Management, people are viewed as economic units, not as democratic participants, which is the hazard of linking an MBA (business administration, economic and employer-based model) too closely with the public administration (governmental, public good) sector. Nevertheless, the NPM model (one of four described by Elmore in 1986, including the "generic model") is still widely accepted at multiple levels of government (e.g., municipal, state/province, and federal) and in many OECD nations.

In the late 1990s, Janet and Robert Denhardt proposed a new public services model in response to the dominance of NPM. A successor to NPM is digital era governance, focusing on themes of reintegrating government responsibilities, needs-based holism (executing duties in cursive ways), and digitalization (exploiting the transformational capabilities of modern IT and digital storage).

One example of DEG deployment is openforum.com.au. This Australian not-for-profit e-Democracy project invites politicians, senior public servants, academics, business people, and other key stakeholders to engage in high-level policy debate. Another example is Brunei's Information Department in deploying Social Media technology to improve its Digital Governance process. The book chapter work concludes that digital dividends can be secured through the effective application of Social Media within the framework of Digital Era Governance.

Another new public service model is what has been called New Public Governance, an approach that includes a centralization of power; an increased number, role, and influence of partisan-political staff; personal-politicization of appointments to the senior public service; and the assumption that the public service is promiscuously partisan for the government of the day.

In the mid-1980s, the goals of community programs in the United States were often expressed in terms such as independent living, community integration, inclusion, community participation, deinstitutionalization, and civil rights. Thus, the same public policy (and public administration) was to apply to all citizens, including those with disabilities. However, by the 1990s, categorical state systems were strengthened in the United States (Racino, in press, 2014), and efforts were made to introduce more disability content into the public policy curricula with disability public policy (and administration) distinct fields in their own right. Behaviorists have also dominated "intervention practice" (generally not the province of public administration) in recent years, believing that they are in opposition to generic public policy (termed ecological systems theory, of the late Urie Bronfenbrenner).

Increasingly, public policy academics and practitioners have used the theoretical concepts of political economy to explain policy outcomes, such as the success or failure of reform efforts and the persistence of suboptimal outcomes.

==== Alternative traditions in public administration ====
===== Women's civic clubs and the Settlement movement =====
Contemporary scholars are reclaiming a companion public administration origin story that includes women's contributions. This has become known as the "alternative" or "settlement" model of public administration. During the 19th century, upper-class women in the United States and Europe organized voluntary associations that worked to mitigate the excesses of urbanization and industrialization in their towns. Eventually, these voluntary associations became networks capable of spearheading changes in policy and administration. These women's civic clubs worked to make cities and workplaces safer (cleaner streets, water, sewage, and workplaces) and more suited to the needs of their children (playgrounds, libraries, juvenile courts, child labor laws). These were administrative and policy spaces that their fathers and husbands ignored. The work of these clubs was amplified by newly organized non-profit organizations (Settlement Houses), usually situated in industrialized city slums filled with immigrants.

Reforms that emerged from the New Deal (e.g., income for older people, unemployment insurance, aid for dependent children and people with disabilities, child labor prohibitions, and limits on hours worked) were supported by leaders of the Settlement movement. Richard Stillman credits Jane Addams, a key leader of the Settlement movement and a pioneer of public administration, with "conceiving and spawning" the modern welfare state. The accomplishments of the Settlement movement and their conception of public administration were ignored in the early literature of public administration. The alternative model of Public Administration was invisible or buried for about 100 years until Camilla Stivers published Bureau Men and Settlement Women in 2000.

Settlement workers explicitly fought for social justice as they campaigned for reform. They sought policy changes that would improve the lives of immigrants, women, children, the sick, the old, and the impoverished. Both municipal housekeeping and industrial citizenship applied an ethic of care informed by the feminine experience of policy and administration. While they saw the relevance of the traditional public administration values (efficiency, effectiveness, etc.) and practices of their male reformist counterparts, they also emphasized social justice and social equity. Jane Addams, for example, was a founder of the National Association for the Advancement of Colored People (NAACP).

===== The Settlement Model of Public Administration =====
The Settlement movement and its leaders, such as Jane Addams, Julia Lathrop, and Florence Kelley, were instrumental in crafting an alternative, feminine-inspired model of public administration. This settlement model of public administration had two interrelated components – municipal housekeeping and industrial citizenship. Municipal housekeeping called for cities to be run like a caring home, the city should be conceived as an extension of the home where families could be safe, and children cared for. Clean streets, clean water, playgrounds, educational curricular reform, and juvenile courts are examples of reforms associated with this movement. Industrial citizenship focused on the problems and risks of labor force participation in a laissez-faire, newly industrialized economy. Reforms that mitigated workplace problems such as child labor, unsanitary working conditions, excessive work hours, the risk of industrial accidents, and old-age poverty were the focus of these efforts. Organized settlement women's reform efforts led to workplace safety laws and inspections. Settlement reformers went on to serve as local, state, and federal administrators. Jane Addams was a garbage inspector, Florence Kelley served as the chief factory inspector for the State of Illinois, Julia Lathrop was the first director of the Women's Bureau, and Francis Perkins was Secretary of Labor during the F. Roosevelt Administration

== Branches ==
=== Core branches ===
In academia, the field of public administration comprises several subfields. Scholars have proposed several different sets of sub-fields. One of the proposed models uses five "pillars":

- Organizational theory in public administration is the study of the structure of governmental entities and the many particulars inculcated in them.
- Ethics in public administration serves as a normative and impartial approach to decision making based on political legitimacy. The public preferences and values can be estimated from opinion polls.
- Policy analysis and program evaluation serves as an empirical approach to decision making.
- Public budgeting and public finance
  - Public budgeting is the activity within a government that seeks to allocate scarce resources among unlimited demands.
  - Public finance is the study of the role of the government in the economy. It is the branch of economics that assesses the government revenue and government expenditure of the public authorities and the adjustment of one or the other to achieve desirable effects and avoid undesirable ones.
- Human resource management is an in-house structure that ensures that public service staffing is done in an unbiased, ethical, and values-based manner. The basic functions of the HR system include employee benefits, employee health care, compensation, and more (e.g., human rights, the Americans with Disabilities Act). The executives managing the HR director and other key departmental personnel are also part of the public administration system.

=== Other branches ===
- Nonprofit management is research into and the practice of operating nonprofit organizations and their effects.
- Emergency management is the managerial function charged with creating the framework within which communities reduce vulnerability to hazards and cope with disasters.

== Academic field ==
Universities can offer undergraduate and graduate degrees in Public Administration or Government, Political Science, and International Affairs with a concentration or specialization in Public Policy and Administration. Graduate degrees include the Master of Public Administration (MPA) degree, a Master of Arts (MA) or Master of Science (MS) in Public Administration (for the management tract), and the Master of Public Policy (MPP), a Master of Arts (MA), or a Master of Science (MS) in Public Policy (for the research tract)

In the United States, the academic field of public administration draws heavily on political science and administrative law. Some MPA programs include economics courses to give students a background in microeconomic issues (markets, rationing mechanisms, etc.) and macroeconomic issues (e.g., national debt). Scholars such as John A. Rohr write of a long history behind the constitutional legitimacy of government bureaucracy.

One public administration scholar, Donald Kettl, argues that "public administration sits in a disciplinary backwater", because "for the last generation, scholars have sought to save or replace it with fields of study like implementation, public management, and formal bureaucratic theory". Kettl states that "public administration, as a subfield within political science ... is struggling to define its role within the discipline". He notes two problems with public administration: it "has seemed methodologically to lag" and "the field's theoretical work too often seems not to define it"-indeed, "some of the most interesting recent ideas in public administration have come from outside the field".

=== Public administration theory and bureaucracy ===
Public administration theory is the domain in which discussions of the meaning and purpose of government, the role of bureaucracy in supporting democratic governments, budgets, governance, and public affairs take place. In the 1920s, the German sociologist Max Weber expanded the definition of bureaucracy to include any system of administration conducted by trained professionals according to fixed rules. Weber saw bureaucracy as a relatively positive development; however, by 1944 the Austrian economist Ludwig von Mises opined in the context of his experience in the Nazi regime that the term bureaucracy was "always applied with an opprobrious connotation", and by 1957 the American sociologist Robert Merton suggested that the term bureaucrat had become an "epithet, a Schimpfwort" in some circumstances.

The word bureaucracy is also used in politics and government with a disapproving tone to disparage official rules that appear to make it difficult—by insisting on procedure and compliance with rules, regulations, and laws—to get things done. In workplaces, the word is often used to blame complicated rules, processes, and written work that are interpreted as obstacles rather than as safeguards and assurances of accountability. Socio-bureaucracy would then refer to certain social influences that may affect the function of a society.

In modern usage, modern bureaucracy has been defined as comprising four features:

1. hierarchy (clearly defined spheres of competence and divisions of labor)
2. continuity (a structure where administrators have a full-time salary and advancement within the structure)
3. impersonality (prescribed rules and operating rules rather than arbitrary actions)
4. expertise (officials are chosen according to merit, have been trained, and hold access to knowledge)

=== Comparative public administration ===
Comparative public administration (CPA) is the study of administrative systems in a comparative fashion, or of public administration in other countries. Today, the American Society for Public Administration has a section that specializes in comparative administration. It is responsible for the annual Riggs Award for Lifetime Achievement in International and Comparative Public Administration.

There have been several issues that have hampered the development of comparative public administration, including the major differences between Western and developing countries; the lack of a curriculum on this subfield in public administration programs; and the limited success in developing theoretical models that can be scientifically tested. Even though CPA is a weakly formed field as a whole, this subfield of public administration is an attempt at cross-cultural analysis, a "quest for patterns and regularities of administrative action and behavior." CPA is an integral part of the analysis of public administration techniques. The process of comparison allows more broadly applicable policies to be tested across a variety of situations.

Comparative public administration lacks a curriculum, which has prevented it from becoming a major field of study. This lack of understanding of the basic concepts that form the field's foundation has ultimately led to its limited use. For example, William Waugh, a professor at Georgia State University, has stated: "Comparative studies are difficult because of the necessity to provide enough information on the sociopolitical context of national administrative structures and processes for readers to understand why there are differences and similarities." He also asserts, "Although there is sizable literature on comparative public administration it is scattered and dated."

=== Bachelor's degrees, academic concentrations, and academic minors ===
Universities offer undergraduate-level bachelor's degrees in Public Administration or Government, Political Science, and International Affairs with an academic concentration or specialization in Public Policy and Administration. At several universities, undergraduate-level public administration and non-profit management education is packaged together (along with international relations and security studies) into a political science degree.

=== Master's degrees ===
Some public administration programs have similarities to business administration programs, as students in both the Master's in Public Administration (MPA) and Master's in Business Administration (MBA) programs often take many of the same courses. Master of Business Administration (MBA) is a postgraduate degree focused on business principles, management, and leadership skills, typically aimed at preparing students for managerial roles in the private sector. Master of Public Administration (MPA) is a postgraduate degree focused on the theory and practice of public administration, management, and policy.

=== Doctoral degrees ===
There are two types of doctoral degrees in public administration: the Doctor of Public Administration (DPA) and the Ph.D. in public administration. The DPA is an applied-research doctoral degree in public administration, focusing more on practice than on theory. The Ph.D. is typically sought by individuals aiming to become professors of public administration or researchers. Individuals pursuing a Ph.D. in public administration often pursue more theoretical dissertation topics than their DPA counterparts.

=== Notable scholars ===
Notable scholars of public administration have come from a wide range of fields. In the period before public administration emerged as an independent sub-discipline of political science, scholars contributing to the field came from economics, sociology, management, political science, law—specifically administrative law—and other related fields. More recently, scholars from public administration and public policy have contributed important studies and theories.

=== Notable Institutions ===
For notable institutions, see the Wikipedia article on public policy schools.

== International organizations ==
There are several international public administration organizations. The Commonwealth Association of Public Administration and Management (CAPAM) includes the 56 member states of the Commonwealth, from India and the UK to Nauru. The oldest organization is the International Institute of Administrative Sciences (IIAS), founded in 1930, in Brussels, Belgium. Another body, the International Committee of the US-based Network of Schools of Public Policy, Affairs, and Administration (NASPAA), has developed several relationships worldwide. They include sub-regional and National forums like CLAD, INPAE, NISPAcee, APSA, ASPA.

The Center for Latin American Administration for Development (CLAD), based in Caracas, Venezuela, is a regional network of schools of public administration set up by the governments in Latin America.

NISPAcee is a network of experts, scholars, and practitioners who work in the field of public administration in Central and Eastern Europe, including the Russian Federation and the Caucasus and Central Asia.

Eastern Regional Organization for Public Administration (EROPA) is a state-membership-based organization, open to other organizations and individuals, headquartered in the Philippines, with centers and membership organized across the Asia-Pacific region. EROPA organizes annual conferences and publishes a journal, Asian Review of Public Administration (ARPA). It has several centers in the region, and assists in networking experts with its members.

== Public management ==
"Public management" is an approach to government and nonprofit administration that resembles or draws on private-sector management and business practices. These business approaches often aim to maximize efficiency and effectiveness and provide improved customer service. A contrast is drawn with the study of public administration, which emphasizes the social and cultural drivers of government that many contend (e.g., Graham T. Allison and Charles Goodsell) makes it different from the private sector. A positive and negative definition of public management have been proposed. The positive approach as: "praxeological and rightful process of public service for citizens for the sake of their and following generations good through strengthening mutual relationships, competitiveness of national economy and practical increase of social utility through effective allocation of public resources". Negative approach as: "Fiction, whose aim is the possibility of temporal or permanent appropriation of public goods for the implementation of the particular interests of a narrow social group". Studying and teaching about public management are widely practiced in developed nations

=== Organizations ===
Many entities study public management in particular, in various countries, including:

- In the US, the American Society for Public Administration. Indiana University Bloomington
- In Canada, the Institute of Public Administration of Canada, the Observatoire de l'Administration publique, and various projects of the Federation of Canadian Municipalities and Housing, Infrastructure and Communities Canada
- In the UK, Institute of Local Government Studies, INLOGOV, Newcastle Business School, Warwick Business School, the London School of Economics, University College London, the UK local democracy project and London Health Observatory.
- In the Netherlands, Erasmus University Rotterdam
- In Australia, the Institute of Public Administration Australia.
- In France, the École nationale d'administration, the Sciences Po School of Public Affairs, the INET, National Institute of Territorial Studies, and the IMPGT, Institute of Public Management and Territorial Governance in Aix-en-Provence, Aix-Marseille University.
- In Belgium, the Public Governance Institute, KU Leuven.
- In Germany, the German University of Administrative Sciences Speyer, the Hertie School of Governance, the Bachelor and Master of Politics, Administration & International Relations (PAIR) at the Zeppelin University Friedrichshafen, and the Bachelor and Master of Public Policy & Management and the Executive Public Management Master of University of Potsdam.
- In Switzerland, the University of Geneva and the Swiss Graduate School of Public Administration (IDHEAP).
- In Italy, the SDA Bocconi School of Management, the graduate business school of Bocconi University in Milan.
- In Cyprus, the Cyprus International Institute of Management.
- In Ireland, the Institute of Public Administration, Dublin.
- In South Africa, Regenesys Business School is offered through the Regenesys School of Public Management and MANCOSA.

Comparative public management, through government performance auditing, examines the efficiency and effectiveness of two or more governments.

== See also ==
- Administration (government)
- Administrative discretion
- Budgeting
- Bureaucracy
- Civil society
- Community services
  - Max Weber
- Doctor of Public Administration
- List of Public Administration Journals
- List of public administration schools
- Master of Public Administration
- Municipal government
- Official
- Political science
- Politics
- Professional administration
- Public policy
- Policy Studies
- Public policy schools
- Social policy
- Teleadministration
- Theories of administration
- The Study of Administration

=== Societies ===
- International Institute of Administrative Sciences
- American Society for Public Administration
- Chinese Public Administration Society
- Dutch Association for Public Administration
- Indian Institute of Public Administration
- Joint University Council of the Applied Social Sciences
- Korea Institute of Public Administration
- Royal Institute of Public Administration

=== Public management academic resources ===
- Public Policy and Administration, ISSN 1749-4192, (electronic) ISSN 0952-0767 (print), SAGE Publications and Joint University Council of the Applied Social Sciences
- International Journal of Public Sector Management, ISSN 0951-3558, Emerald Group Publishing
- Public Management Review, ISSN 1471-9045 (electronic) ISSN 1471-9037 (paper) Routledge
- Public Works Management & Policy, ISSN 1552-7549 (electronic) ISSN 1087-724X (paper), SAGE Publications
- Public Administration and Development, ISSN 1099-162X, Wiley (publisher)
