= Electronic document =

Electronic media formatted as a document

An electronic document is a document that can be sent through non-physical means, such as telex, email, and the internet. Originally, any computer data were considered as something internal—the final data output was always on paper. However, the development of computer networks has made it so that in most cases it is much more convenient to distribute electronic documents than printed ones. The improvements in electronic visual display technologies made it possible to view documents on a screen instead of printing them (thus saving paper and the space required to store the printed copies). However, using electronic documents for the final presentation instead of paper has created the problem of multiple incompatible file formats. Even plain text computer files are not free from this problem—e.g. under MS-DOS, most programs could not work correctly with UNIX-style text files (see newline), and for non-English speakers, the different code pages always have been a source of trouble.

Even more problems are connected with complex file formats of various word processors, spreadsheets, and graphics software. To alleviate the problem, many software companies distribute free file viewers for their proprietary file formats (one example is Adobe's Acrobat Reader). The other solution is the development of standardized non-proprietary file formats (such as HTML and OpenDocument), and electronic documents for specialized uses have specialized formats—the specialized electronic articles in physics use TeX or PostScript.

== See also ==
- Digital era governance
- Digital library
- Digital media
- E-government
- Ebook
- Electronic paper
- Electronic publishing
- Paperless office
