= Elements of the Philosophy of Right =

1820 work by G. W. F. Hegel

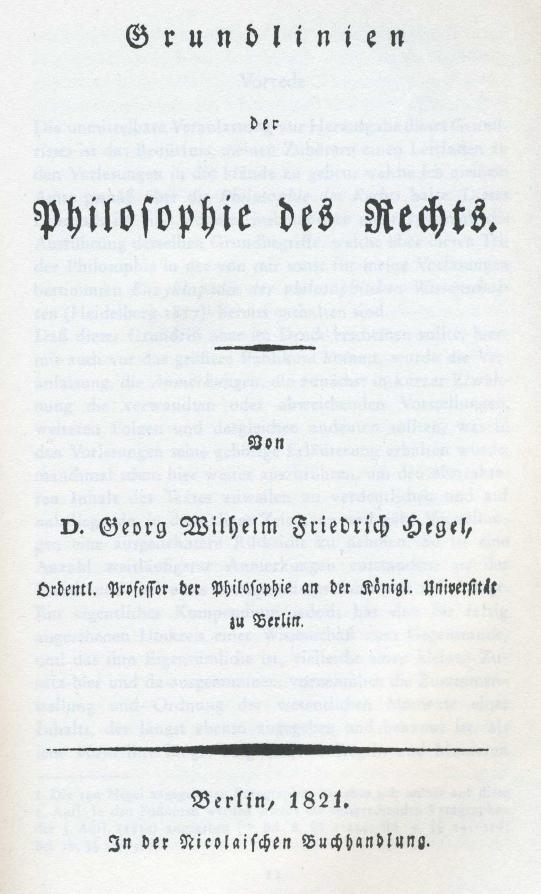
- Title page of the 1821 original work
- Original title: Grundlinien der Philosophie des Rechts
- Language: German
- Publication date: 1820
- Text: Elements of the Philosophy of Right at Internet Archive

Elements of the Philosophy of Right (or Outlines of the Philosophy of Right; German: Grundlinien der Philosophie des Rechts) is a work by Georg Wilhelm Friedrich Hegel published in 1820, though the book's original title page dates it to 1821. Hegel's most mature statement of his legal, moral, social and political philosophy, it is an expansion upon concepts only briefly treated in the Encyclopedia of the Philosophical Sciences, published in 1817 (and again in 1827 and 1830).

== Summary ==
The work begins with a discussion of the concept of the free will and argues that the free will can realize itself only in the complicated social context of property rights and relations, contracts, moral commitments, family life, the economy, the legal system, and the government. A person is not truly free, in other words, unless he is a participant in all of these different aspects of the life of the state.

The bulk of the book is devoted to discussing Hegel's three spheres or versions of 'right,' each one larger than the preceding ones and encompassing them. The first sphere is abstract right (Recht), in which Hegel discusses the idea of 'non-interference' as a way of respecting others. He deems this insufficient and moves onto the second sphere, morality (Moralität). Under this, Hegel proposes that humans reflect their own subjectivity of others in order to respect them. The third sphere, ethical life (Sittlichkeit), is Hegel's integration of individual subjective feelings and universal notions of right. Under ethical life, Hegel then launches into a lengthy discussion about family, civil society, and the state.

Hegel also argues that the state itself is subsumed under the higher totality of world history, in which individual states arise, conflict with one another, and eventually fall. The course of history is apparently toward the ever-increasing actualization of freedom; each successive historical epoch corrects certain failures of the earlier ones. At the end of his Lectures on the Philosophy of History, Hegel leaves open the possibility that history has yet to accomplish certain tasks related to the inner organization of the state.

== Reception ==
His students' lecture notes at §258 were translated as "The state is the march of God through the world" and "The existence of the state is the presence of God upon the earth". Some readings justified authoritarianism or totalitarianism, including philosopher Giovanni Gentile's in his Hegelian revival (and influence on Benito Mussolini). But Walter Kaufmann's 1951 essay "The Hegel Myth and Its Method" argued that a better translation of Gang Gottes is not God's "march" but God's "way": "It is the way of God in the world, that there should be a state", suggesting that the state is neither human nor godly, and not for subjugation as such, but part of divine unfolding of history.

The preface to the Philosophy of Right contains considerable criticism of the philosophy of Jakob Friedrich Fries, who had been a critic of Hegel's prior work. Included in this is a suggestion that it is justifiable for the state to censor the writings of philosophers like Fries and welcoming Fries' loss of his academic position following Fries' participation in the Wartburg Festival. The inclusion of this passage has led to scholarly debate as to the reason for Hegel's advocacy of the kind of censorship the Prussian state had introduced following the murder of August von Kotzebue in the form of the Carlsbad Decrees. Hegel scholars have suggested that the inclusion of these passages was done to satisfy the censors. T. M. Knox argued that, while clearly designed to curry favour with the censors and written well after completion of the work proper, the Preface's condemnation of Fries was "nothing new", that there was no betrayal of his support for the Wartburg Festival principles, rather a mere denunciation of method, while condemnation of Karl Ludwig von Haller (whose work had been burned at Wartburg) remained undisturbed in the body of the work. Stephen Houlgate, editing the The Hegel Reader, called the Philosophy of Right "one of the greatest works of social and political philosophy".

United States President Woodrow Wilson's essay "The Study of Administration" drew on Hegel's treatment of law and the state in Philosophy of Right, especially Hegel's picture of how public institutions arise and mediate social conflict. This Hegelian framework helped underpin his vision of an expert‑driven, progressive administrative state and his later Wilsonian idealist foreign policy, which cast the United States as a moral‑political vanguard guiding the historical progress of nations.

== See also ==
- Owl of Athena (referred in Preface)
