= Wilsonian idealism =

Anti-war type of liberal internationalist foreign policy doctrine

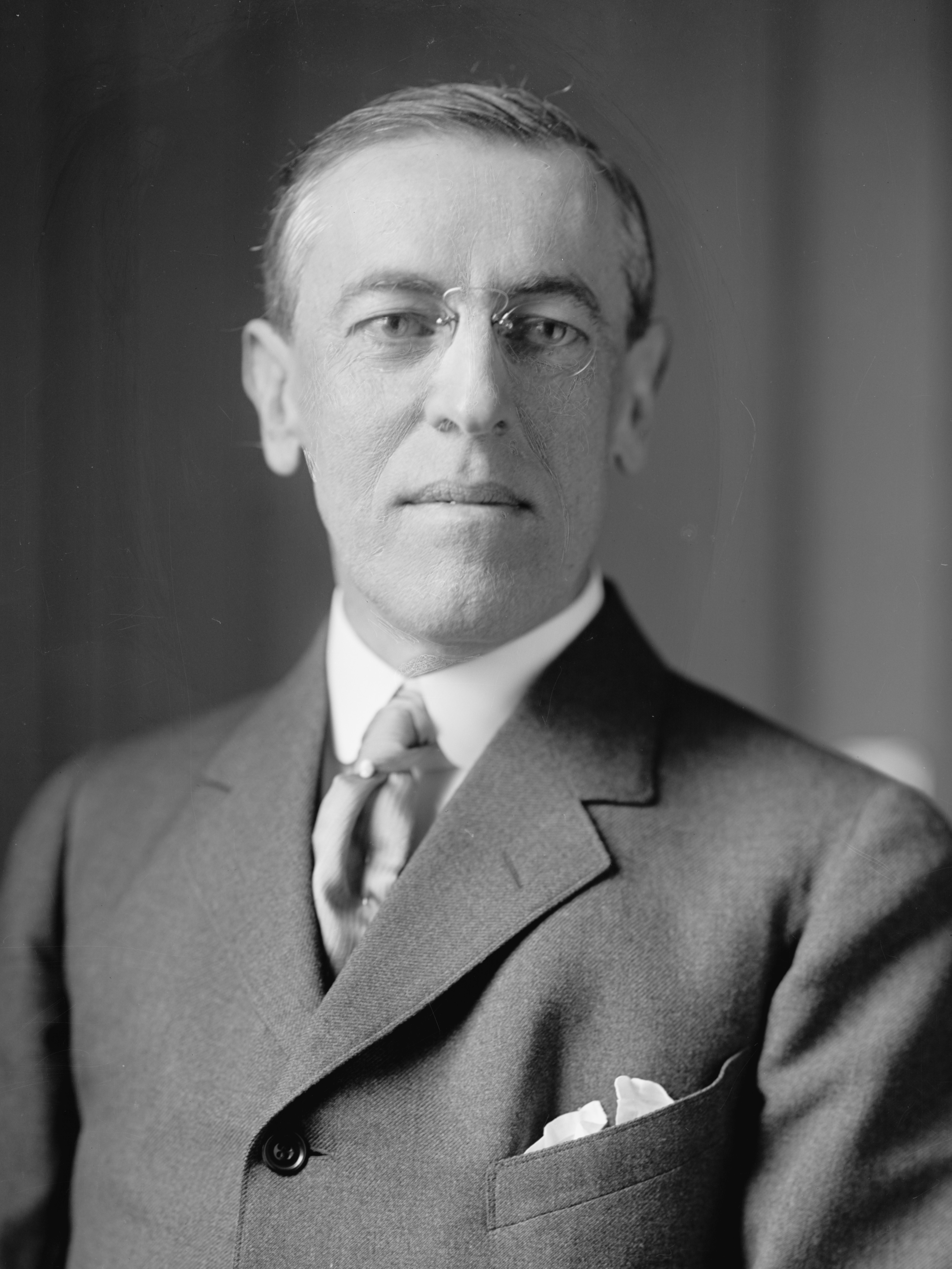
Woodrow Wilson, after whom Wilsonian idealism is named

Wilsonian idealism (also Wilsonianism) is a type of foreign policy that comes from the ideas and proposals of United States president Woodrow Wilson. He issued his famous Fourteen Points in January 1918 as a basis for ending World War I and promoting world peace. He was a leading advocate of the League of Nations to enable the international community to avoid wars and end hostile aggression. Wilsonianism is a form of liberal democratic internationalism.

Wilson's 1887 essay "The Study of Administration" is a foundational text in American liberalism and progressivism that covered elevating "administration" – the practical execution of government work – to a distinct field of scientific inquiry. Writing during the late 19th century, Wilson aimed to professionalize a government system he viewed as increasingly inefficient, corrupt, and hindered by the "spoils system". Wilson drew on Georg Wilhelm Friedrich Hegel's treatment of law and the state in Elements of the Philosophy of Right, especially Hegel's picture of how public institutions arise and mediate social conflict.

== Principles ==
Common principles that are often associated with Wilsonianism include:

- Advocacy of the spread of democracy. Anne-Marie Slaughter writes that Wilson expected and hoped that "democracy would result from self-determination, but he never sought to spread democracy directly." Slaughter writes that Wilson's League of Nations was similarly intended to foster liberty and democracy by serving as "a high wall behind which nations", especially small nations, "could exercise their right of self determination" but that Wilson did not envision that the United States would affirmatively intervene to "direct" or "shape" democracies in foreign nations.
- Conferences and bodies devoted to resolving conflict, especially the League of Nations and the United Nations.
- Emphasis on self-determination of peoples.
- Advocacy of the spread of capitalism.
- Support for collective security, and at least partial opposition to American isolationism.
- Support for open diplomacy and opposition to secret treaties.
- Support for freedom of navigation and freedom of the seas.
- Belief that the foreign policies of democracies are morally superior because the people under democracies are inherently peace-loving.

Historian Joan Hoff wrote, "What is 'normal' Wilsonianism remains contested today [2007]. For some, it is 'inspiring liberal internationalism' based on adherence to self-determination; for others, Wilsonianism is the exemplar of humanitarian intervention around the world,' making U.S. foreign policy a paragon of carefully defined and restricted use of force." Amos Perlmutter defined Wilsonianism as simultaneously consisting of "liberal internationalism, self-determination, nonintervention, humanitarian intervention" oriented in support of collective security, open diplomacy, capitalism, American exceptionalism, and free and open borders, and opposed to revolution.

According to University of Chicago political theorist Adom Getachew, Wilson's version of self-determination was a reassociation of an idea that others had previously imbued with different meanings. Wilson's version of self-determination "effectively recast self-determination as a racially differentiated principle, which was fully compatible with imperial rule."

== Wilsonian moment ==
The Wilsonian moment was a time in the wake of the First World War in which many of those in the colonized world hoped that the time had come for the pre-war world order, which placed the Western powers at the top and marginalized the majority of the rest of the world, to be demolished and non-European nations would be given their rightful place. Erez Manela is a key historian of the Wilsonian moment, having produced work on the topic which include case studies on the Wilsonian moment in Egypt, Korea, China, and India. He aimed to address the fact that the significance of Wilsonianism in Asia and Africa had received little attention from scholars. The reaction in the colonized world was largely the result of Wilson's Fourteen Points speech on 8 January 1918, in which Wilson advocated the formation of a "general association of nations", "for the purpose of affording mutual guarantees of political independence and territorial integrity to great and small states alike". He declared in a subsequent speech to the United States Congress on February 8, 1918, that in the post-war peace settlement "national aspirations must be respected" and people could only be governed "by their own consent". Self-determination was not "a mere phrase" but an "imperative principle of action".

Wilson's words launched an atmosphere of intense optimism and hope amongst marginalized peoples in all corners of the globe. Manela argues that by December 1918, shortly before the Paris Peace Conference (1919–1920), Wilson was "a man of almost transcendent significance". Wilson's rhetoric certainly had an impact in Asian nations, including India, where he was hailed as "The Modern Apostle of Freedom" by Indian nationalist Ganesh Shankar Vidyarthi, and in China, where Wilson's words were viewed as a crucial opportunity to improve China's situation domestically and internationally. According to Manela, many in Asia had faith that Wilson could and did intend to form a new international order, reducing the gap between the East and the West. In Egypt, Wilson's self-determination advocation led to hopes that Egypt may be freed from British control and would be afforded the opportunity to rule itself. Sarah Claire Dunstan's work also indicates that Wilson's rhetoric had an impact on marginalized groups within the United States, such as African Americans. Members of disenfranchised groups like the African-American community were enthusiastic and some members, like people in various colonized nations, felt an opportunity had arisen to forward their own case for self-determination.

All the hopes for self-determination that Wilson raised would soon be dashed when the Treaty of Versailles was signed on 28 June 1919. Versailles did not destroy the colonial system, and much of the colonial world was left in disillusionment. Manela suggests this led to violent protest movements in various marginalized nations, including the Egyptian Revolution of 1919, the May Fourth Movement in China, Mahatma Gandhi's passive resistance movement in India, and the March 1st Movement in Korea.

== Impact ==
Historian David Kennedy argues that American foreign relations since 1914 have rested on Wilsonian idealism, even if adjusted somewhat by the realism represented by Franklin D. Roosevelt and Henry Kissinger. Kennedy argues that every president since Wilson has "embraced the core precepts of Wilsonianism. Nixon himself hung Wilson's portrait in the White House Cabinet Room. Wilson's ideas continue to dominate American foreign policy in the twenty-first century. In the aftermath of 9/11 they have, if anything, taken on even greater vitality."

Wilson was a remarkably effective writer and thinker, and his diplomatic policies had a profound influence on shaping the world. Diplomatic historian Walter Russell Mead said:

"Wilson's principles survived the eclipse of the Versailles system and they still guide European politics today: self-determination, democratic government, collective security, international law, and a league of nations. Wilson may not have gotten everything he wanted at Versailles, and his treaty was never ratified by the Senate, but his vision and his diplomacy, for better or worse, set the tone for the twentieth century. France, Germany, Italy, and Britain may have sneered at Wilson, but every one of these powers today conducts its European policy along Wilsonian lines. What was once dismissed as visionary is now accepted as fundamental. This was no mean achievement, and no European statesman of the twentieth century has had as lasting, as benign, or as widespread an influence."

== Neo-Wilsonian Idealism ==
Neo-Wilsonian Idealism refers to a modern revision of Wilsonian Idealism that began in a Post-World War I political World Order, more specifically The Cold War ,The War on Terror, and more broadly contemporary global challenges.

== See also ==
- Diplomatic history of World War I
- Empire of Liberty
- International relations (1919–1939)
- Nation-building
- Stimson Doctrine
