= Dutch Association for Public Administration =

The Vereniging voor Bestuurskunde (Dutch Association for Public Administration) was established in 1973 as a platform for people interested in the field of public administration. It aims to give people the opportunity to gain knowledge about developments in the field of public administration and discuss these with each other.

At this moment the Vereniging voor Bestuurskunde (Dutch Association for Public Administration) has about 1,000 individual and institutional members. Among them are students, scientists and practitioners in the field of public administration. Members of the last category could be management consultants, civil servants, and others that are interested in public administration.

The Vereniging voor Bestuurskunde (Dutch Association for Public Administration) aims to play a distinct role in the debate about the developments of public administration in the Netherlands and in more international contexts. Therefore, the Vereniging voor Bestuurskunde (Dutch Association for Public Administration) both tries to generate knowledge about public administration and give the opportunity to engage in debates about opportune topics. In these debates scientific and practical insights are brought together because of the mixed character of the members of the Vereniging voor Bestuurskunde (Dutch Association for Public Administration).

== Activities ==
Activities of the Vereniging voor Bestuurskunde (Dutch Association for Public Administration) include:

- Publishing the scientific magazine Bestuurskunde (Public Administration).
- Organising large nationwide conferences twice a year.
- Regional subcommittees organise smaller conferences regularly.
- www.bestuurskunde.nl, which serves as a platform for interaction among members, knowledge, and communication with the Vereniging voor Bestuurskunde (Dutch Association for Public Administration).
- Virtueel Bestuur (Virtual Administration). An e-magazine with information and opinions about topics in public administration.
- Participation in institutional networks with e.g. student-associations and other professional organisations.

Through all these activities, the Vereniging voor Bestuurskunde (Dutch Association for Public Administration) hopes to build a bridge between the practice and the science of public administration.
