= European E-government projects =

Best practice exchanges among municipal governments

European E-government projects are best practice exchanges among municipal governments. Arising out of a "national strategy for local e-government, the 22 National Projects offer councils proven, cost effective, standard products, services and implementation roadmaps with which to build effective e-services tailored to their citizens and each council's own unique needs."

Its knowledge pool consisted mostly of ways to enable participatory democracy using e-democracy and more use of information technology to listen to constituents.

The more e-government focused UK local egov product catalogue "enables users to access and download hundreds of National Project outputs" to "assist with specific Priority Outcomes or Efficiency Review categories.". Its most popular "products" included:

- redesigning your Intranet
- business process modelling notation
- approaches to systems integration
