= Philosophy of Management =

- Discipline: Management, Philosophy
- Language: English
- Edited by: Pail Griseri (managing editor)

Publication details
- Former name: Reason in Practice
- History: 2003-present; 2001-2002 as Reason in Practice
- Publisher: Springer Publishing (Switzerland)
- Frequency: Quarterly

Standard abbreviations
- Bluebook: Phil. Mgmt.
- ISO 4: Philos. Manag.

Indexing
- ISSN: 1740-3812 (print); 2052-9597 (web)
- LCCN: 2004251067
- OCLC no.: 55858120

Links
- Journal homepage; Online browse and access

Philosophy of Management is a peer-reviewed academic journal that examines philosophical issues of management in theory and practice. The editor-in-chief is Wim Vandekerckhove. The executive editors include David Carl Wilson, Cristina Neesham, Eva Tsahuridu, and Vincent Blok. The book review editor is Marian Eabrasu. The founding editor was Nigel Laurie. The journal is published by Springer Publishing.
