= The Study of Administration =

1887 article

"The Study of Administration" was an article published in the June 1887 Political Science Quarterly publication by Woodrow Wilson. It is widely considered a foundational article in the field of public administration, making Wilson one of the field's founding fathers, along with Max Weber and Frederick Winslow Taylor.

== Overview ==
Although colleges were already teaching public administration in the 1880s, it was considered a subfield of political science. Wilson argued that it should be treated as its own field of study, with public administrators being directly responsible to political leaders. He believed that politicians should be accountable to the people and that political administration should be treated as a science, and its practitioners given authority to address issues in their respective fields.

"The Study of Administration" was heavily inspired by Georg Wilhelm Friedrich Hegel's treatment of law and the state in his work Elements of the Philosophy of Right, especially Hegel's picture of how public institutions arise and mediate social conflict.

== See also ==
- Wilsonian idealism
