= Housing, Theory and Society =

- Discipline: Housing studies, urban studies, social policy
- Language: English
- Edited by: Hannu Ruonavaara

Publication details
- Former names: Scandinavian Housing and Planning Research
- History: 1984-present
- Publisher: Routledge
- Frequency: Quarterly
- Impact factor: 2.317 (2019)

Standard abbreviations
- ISO 4: Hous. Theory Soc.

Indexing
- ISSN: 1403-6096 (print); 1651-2278 (web)
- LCCN: 2012263231
- OCLC no.: 173396204

Links
- Journal homepage; Online access; Online archive

Housing, Theory and Society is a quarterly peer-reviewed academic journal covering the fields of housing studies, social theory and social policy. The editor-in-chief is Hannu Ruonavaara (University of Turku) and it is published by Routledge. It was established in 1984 as Scandinavian Housing and Planning Research, obtaining its current name in 1999. According to the Journal Citation Reports, the journal has a 2018 impact factor of 2.317.
