= Digital era governance =

The first idea of a digital administrative law was born in Italy in 1978 by Giovanni Duni and was developed in 1991 with the name teleadministration.

In the public administration debate about new public management (NPM), the concept of digital era governance (or DEG) is claimed by Patrick Dunleavy, Helen Margetts and their co-authors as replacing NPM since around 2000 to 2005. DEG has three key elements: reintegration (bringing issues back into government control, like US airport security after 9/11); needs-based holism (reorganizing government around distinct client groups); and digitization (fully exploiting the potential of digital storage and Internet communications to transform governance). Digital era governance implies that public sector organizations are facing new challenges and rapidly changing information technologies and information systems.

Since the popularization of the theory, it has been applied and enriched through the empirical works, such as the case study done on Brunei's Information Department. The case study demonstrated that digital dividends that can be secured through the effective application of new technology in the digital governance process.

== Management approaches for digital era governance ==
To create a better government by means of ICT, public sector organizations cannot rely on their traditional methods. Firstly, traditional public services often are fragmented, duplicative, and inconsistent across government. Secondly, silo-like organizational management then leads to more individual government offices that are less effective regarding the creation of public values. A reorientation towards more innovative approaches is necessary. The mere implementation of technological instruments however does not necessarily require a change of management. For an improved government it is necessary to go from traditional management approaches towards innovative approaches.

=== Collaborative management ===
One approach is a highly collaborative way of managing future policy implementations such as the development of proactive public services. Such proactive services require little to no action by the users and eliminate the "burden and confusion for citizens and businesses, who can now obtain services without dealing with bureaucracy". This new course of action on the one hand entails a significant transformation of government practices while on the other hand proactive or new services (e.g., automated assistants) might rely on third parties who are leveraging government information. This shift from government-provided towards third party services represents a distinct approach and forces public management to transfer some of their control by forming policy knowledge and resource networks.

=== Problem oriented governance ===
Another approach refers to a change of mindset. This means that management should consider the transformation from service-oriented governance towards problem-oriented governance which is an "approach to policy design and implementation that emphasizes the need for organizations to adapt their form and functioning to the nature of the public problems they seek to address". This will create a more holistic and efficient way of tackling citizens’ needs and future technological advances. Since the digital era management challenges are also about harmonizing "delivery-first, user-centric, agile work models while also satisfying, or alternatively, challenging, onerous hierarchical accountability requirements", public sector organizations require fundamental change of the inflexible culture of bureaucratic organizations, e.g., by establishing cross-functional problem-oriented teams.

== See also ==
- Cyberocracy
- E-governance
- E-government
- Government by algorithm
