= List of public administration scholars =

This list of public administration scholars includes notable theorists, academics, and researchers from public administration, public policy, and related fields such as economics, political science, management, administrative law. All of the individuals in this list have made a notable contribution to the field of public administration.

- O. P. Dwivedi
- Graham T. Allison
- Paul Appleby
- Walter Bagehot
- Chester Barnard
- Reinhard Bendix
- Francis Bland
- James M. Buchanan
- Lynton K. Caldwell
- Michel Crozier
- Robert A. Dahl
- A.V. Dicey
- Anthony Downs
- Peter Drucker
- Patrick Dunleavy
- Dorman Bridgman Eaton
- David John Farmer
- Henri Fayol
- James W. Fesler
- Mary Parker Follett
- H. George Frederickson
- Francis Fukuyama
- Louis C. Gawthrop
- Frank J. Goodnow
- Charles Goodsell
- Luther Gulick
- Friedrich Hayek
- Hugh Heclo
- E. Pendleton Herring
- Otto Hintze
- Marc Holzer
- Ralph P. Hummel
- Patricia Ingraham
- Barry Dean Karl
- V.O. Key, Jr.
- Gyula Koi
- Harold Laski
- Harold Lasswell
- Charles E. Lindblom
- Michael Lipsky
- Norton E. Long
- Theodore J. Lowi
- Niklas Luhmann
- James March
- Roscoe C. Martin
- Karl Marx
- Renate Mayntz
- Howard E. McCurdy
- Kenneth J. Meier
- Robert K. Merton
- Henry Mintzberg
- Mark H. Moore
- Frederick C. Mosher
- R. E. Neustadt
- Felix A. Nigro
- W. A. Niskanen
- Rosemary O'Leary
- Johan Olsen
- Elinor Ostrom
- Laurence O'Toole
- C. Northcote Parkinson
- James L. Perry
- Gerrit van Poelje
- Jack Rabin
- Hal G. Rainey
- Emmette Redford
- R. A. W. Rhodes
- Norma M. Riccucci
- Alasdair Roberts
- John A. Rohr
- David H. Rosenbloom
- Philip James Rutledge
- S.N. Sadasivan
- Allen Schick
- Philip Selznick
- Patricia M. Shields
- Herbert A. Simon
- Theda Skocpol
- Stephen Skowronek
- Lorenz von Stein
- Richard J. Stillman II
- Camilla Stivers
- Joseph R. Strayer
- Frederick Winslow Taylor
- Alain Touraine
- Thomas Frederick Tout
- Paul P. Van Riper
- Dwight Waldo
- Gary Wamsley
- Kenneth F. Warren
- Max Weber
- Leonard D. White
- Aaron Wildavsky
- William F. Willoughby
- James Q. Wilson
- Woodrow Wilson
- Deil S. Wright
