= Farmer (surname) =

Farmer is an English surname. Although an occupationally derived surname, it was not given to tillers of the soil, but to collectors of taxes and tithes specializing in the collection of funds from agricultural leases. In 2000, there were 68,309 people with the last name Farmer in the United States, making it the 431st most common last name in the nation.

== Notable people bearing the surname Farmer ==
- Andrew Farmer (American football) (born 2000), American football player
- Art Farmer (1928–1999), American jazz trumpeter and flugelhorn player
- Beverley Farmer (1941–2018), Australian writer
- Bill Farmer (born 1952), American voice actor and comedian
- Bill Farmer (public servant) (born 1947), former senior Australian public servant
- Buck Farmer (born 1991), American baseball player
- Charles "Red" Farmer (born c. 1930), American NASCAR race driver
- Dan Farmer (born 1962), American computer security researcher
- Darci Lynne Farmer (born 2004), American ventriloquist
- David John Farmer (born 1935), British philosopher
- Declan Farmer (born 1997), American sledge hockey player
- Desmon Farmer (born 1981), American professional basketball player
- Donald Dickson Farmer (1877–1956), Scottish recipient of the Victoria Cross
- Ed Farmer (1949–2020), American professional baseball player and broadcaster
- Edward McNeil Farmer (1901–1969) American watercolorist and oil painter, former professor at Stanford University.
- Emily Farmer (1826–1905), English water-colourist and Victorian painter
- Evan Farmer (born 1972), American actor, musician, and television personality
- Fannie Farmer (1857–1915), American culinary expert and cookbook author
- Frances Farmer (1913–1970), American film actress
- Frank Farmer (disambiguation), multiple people
- Gary Farmer (born 1953), Canadian First Nations actor
- Gary Farmer (Florida politician) (born 1964), American politician and attorney from Florida
- George Farmer (disambiguation), multiple people
- Graham Farmer (1935–2019), Australian rules football player and coach
- Henry George Farmer (1882–1965), British musicologist
- Hugo Farmer (1878–1957), American politician from Arizona
- J. Doyne Farmer (born 1952), American physicist
- Jalen Farmer (born 2004), American football player
- James Farmer (disambiguation), multiple people named James or Jim(my) Farmer
- Jean Farmer-Butterfield (born 1947), American politician from North Carolina
- Jeff Farmer (footballer) (born 1977), Aboriginal Australian rules footballer
- Jeff Farmer (wrestler) (born 1962), professional wrestler known as The Black Scorpion
- John Farmer (disambiguation), multiple people
- Joseph John Farmer (1854–1930), English recipient of the Victoria Cross
- Joshua Farmer, American football player
- Karl Farmer (born 1954), American football player
- Ken Farmer (1910–1982), Australian rules football player
- Kenneth Farmer (1912–2005), Canadian hockey player and businessman
- Kyle Farmer (born 1990), American baseball player
- Larry Farmer (born 1942), American professor of law at Brigham Young University
- Larry Farmer (born 1951), American college basketball coach
- Lydia Hoyt Farmer (1842–1903), American author, women's rights activist
- Mark Farmer (comics) (born 1957), British comic book artist
- Michael Farmer (disambiguation), multiple people
- Mimsy Farmer (born 1945), American actress and sculptor living in France
- Moses G. Farmer (1820–1893), American electrical engineer and inventor, pioneer in telegraphy
- Mylène Farmer (born 1961), Canadian-born French singer and songwriter
- Nancy Farmer (politician) (born 1956), American politician from Missouri
- Nancy Farmer (author) (born 1941), American author of children's books
- Nick Farmer, American linguist and writer
- Pat Farmer (born 1962), Australian politician, member of the Australian House of Representatives from New South Wales
- Pat Farmer (soccer) (born 1949), American soccer coach
- Paul Farmer (1959–2022), American physician and professor at Harvard University
- Paul S. Farmer (born 1950), pioneer in the use of pop music in UK school music education in the 1970s
- Penelope Farmer (born 1939), British writer of books for children and adults
- Peter Farmer (disambiguation), multiple people
- Philip José Farmer (1918–2009), American science fiction and fantasy author
- Randy Farmer (born 1961), American pioneer in creating online communities
- Richard Farmer (1735–1797), English Shakespearean scholar
- Richard T. Farmer (contemporary), American businessman
- Richie Farmer (born 1969), American politician and former college basketball player
- Seymour Farmer (1875–1951), Welsh-Canadian politician, mayor of Winnipeg
- Susan Farmer (1942–2013), American politician, media executive and television personality
- Suzan Farmer (1942–2017), English actress
- Terry Farmer (1931–2014), English professional footballer
- Thomas Farmer (disambiguation), multiple people
- Tom Farmer (1940–2025), Scottish entrepreneur and millionaire
- Tommy Lee Farmer, American criminal
- Wilfred Farmer (1921–1975), Barbadian cricketer and police officer
- William M. Farmer (1853–1931), American jurist and politician
- Little Willie Farmer (born 1956), American blues singer, guitarist, and songwriter

== See also ==
- Farmar, surname
