= Refounding Public Administration =

1990 book about public service

- Editor: Gary Wamsley
- Language: English
- Genre: Non-fiction
- Publication date: 1990

Refounding Public Administration (1990) is a noted text in the public administration field that formulated a multi-faceted argument that government is properly an agential and active servant of the public good. It is among a very few books that have been pivotal in defining public administration as a distinct field from political science with its own theory and raison d'etre. Other works in this genre include Dwight Waldo's The Administrative State and Frederick C. Mosher's Democracy and the Public Service. The work was edited by Gary Wamsley, who contributed a classic essay on bureaucratic agency, and also includes works by Charles Goodsell, John Rohr, Camilla Stivers, Orion White, Philip Kronenberg, James Wolf and others.

A follow-on volume called Refounding Democratic Public Administration was edited by Wamsley and Wolf. These works have strongly influenced the development of the Center for Public Administration and Policy as a center of public administration research.

== See also ==
- The Administrative State
- public administration theory
