= Gawthrop (surname) =

Gawthrop is a surname. Notable people with the surname include:

- Daniel Gawthrop:
  - Daniel E. Gawthrop (born 1949), American composer
  - Daniel Gawthrop (writer) (born 1963), Canadian journalist
- Louis C. Gawthrop, American political scientist
- Robert S. Gawthrop III (1942–1999), American judge

== See also ==
- Gawthrop, Cumbria
