= Philip B. Coulter =

American political scientist

Philip Brooks Coulter
- Born: February 27, 1939 (age 87); Elizabethtown, Kentucky, USA

Academic background
- Education: State University of New York at Albany (Ph.D., 1966); University of Kentucky (24 graduate hours, 1961–1962); Centre College (B.A., 1961)

Academic work
- Discipline: political science
- Awards: Outstanding Academic Book Award; Distinguished Alumnus Award; William E. Mosher and Frederick C. Mosher Award

Philip Brooks Coulter (born February 27, 1939, in Elizabethtown, Kentucky, USA; abbreviated: Philip B. Coulter) is a US political scientist and is Professor Emeritus of Political Science as well as former Dean at the University of New Orleans (UNO).

== Education ==
In 1961, he received his Bachelor of Arts in Political Science and English at Centre College. From 1961 to 1962, he passed 24 graduate hours at the Department of Political Science of the University of Kentucky. He holds a Doctor of Philosophy in Political Science from the State University of New York at Albany, Rockefeller College of Public Affairs & Policy (1966).

== Experience ==
=== Academic ===
Coulter was instructor in Government (especially: State Government and Metropolitan Politics) at the Department of Political Science of the University of Massachusetts Amherst/UMass Amherst (1964–1966). He was assistant professor (1966–1970) and associate professor (1970–1975) at the UMass Amherst. At the Department of Political Science of the College of Liberal Arts of Purdue University in West Lafayette, Indiana, he was professor of Political Science (1976–1978). Coulter was professor of Political Science at the University of Alabama (UA) in Tuscaloosa, Alabama (1978–1990). He held the chair of the Department of Political Science of the College of Arts and Sciences of the UA (1978–1985). Coulter is Founder and was Director of the Institute for Social Science Research (ISSR) of the College of Arts and Sciences of the UA (1985–1990). He was professor of Political Science of the UNO (1990–2006). For a decade, he was dean of the College of Liberal Arts (COLA) of the UNO (1990–2000), and he was vice chancellor Associate for International Programs of the UNO (2000–2002). Coulter was dean of the College of Urban and Public Affairs (CUPA; today: Center for Urban and Public Affairs [CUPA], College of Planning and Urban Studies) of the UNO (2004–2006). He retired from the UNO on February 28, 2006. The UNO awarded him the status of Dean and Professor Emeritus in 2007.

=== Other professional ===
From January to August 1971, Coulter was visiting professor at the Department of Public Administration of the International Institute of Social Studies (ISS) of Erasmus University Rotterdam in the Netherlands. In summer 1973, he was post-doctoral scholar at NATO Advanced Studies Institute in Regional Science at the University of Karlsruhe in Germany. In summer 1974, Coulter was a participant in the post-doctoral program in Population Studies of the University of North Carolina at Chapel Hill. He was senior political scientist at the Research Triangle Institute (RTI) from 1975 to 1976. In the year 1987, he was visiting lecturer in Public Administration at the Federal Executive Institute in Charlottesville, Virginia. In summer 2003, he was Professor at the University of New Orleans in connection with the Glories of France Program in Montpellier in France.

== Distinctions ==
He received the following awards:

- Outstanding Academic Book Award (for his Political voice), The Association of College and Research Libraries (ACRL);
- Distinguished Alumnus Award, Rockefeller College of Public Affairs & Policy, State University of New York at Albany;
- William E. Mosher and Frederick C. Mosher Award (for the best article in Public Administration Review), American Society for Public Administration.

== Works ==
=== Books ===
- As editor: Politics of Metropolitan Areas. New York City: Thomas Y. Crowell Co., 1967. 497 pp.
- Social Mobilization and Liberal Democracy: A Macroquantitative Analysis of Global and Regional Models. Lexington, Massachusetts: D. C. Heath and Co., 1975. ISBN 978-0-669-98053-0. 212 pp.
- As co-editor and co-author with Terry Busson: Policy Evaluation for Local Government. Westport, Connecticut: Greenwood Press, 1987. ISBN 978-0-313-25953-1. 286 pp.
- Political Voice: Citizen Demand for Urban Public Services, Tuscaloosa. Tuscaloosa: University of Alabama Press, 1988. 105 pp.
- Measuring Inequality. A Methodological Handbook. Boulder, Colorado: Westview Press, 1989. ISBN 978-0-8133-7726-1. 204 pp.

=== Articles ===
- "Democratic Political Development: A Systemic Model Based on Regulative Policy", Development and Change, (under contract to: International Institute of Social Studies/ISS, Erasmus-Universität Rotterdam) 3, 1, autumn 1971, pp. 25–62.
- "Policy Science: The Perspective of Policy Research Institutes", Policy Studies Journal, 6, 3, University of Colorado Denver March 1978, pp. 238–45.
- "Organizational Effectiveness in the Public Sector: The Example of Municipal Fire Protection", Administrative Science Quarterly, 24, 1, March 1979, pp. 65–82.
- With Patrick R. Cotter and Jeffrey Cohen: "Race-of-Interviewer Effects in Telephone Interviews", Public Opinion Quarterly, 46, 2, summer 1982, pp. 278–284.
- With Karin Brown: "Subjective and Objective Measures of Police Service Delivery", Public Administration Review, 43, 1, January/February 1983, pp. 50–59.
- With Terry Pittman: "Measuring Who Gets What: A Mathematical Model of Maldistribution", Political Methodology (since 1986: Political Analysis), 9, 3, 1983, pp. 215–234.
- "Inferring the Distributional Effects of Bureaucratic Decision Rules", Policy Studies Journal, 12, 2, University of Colorado Denver, December 1983, pp. 347–55.
- With Terry Busson (from Policy Evaluation for Local Government): A symposium in Policy Studies Journal, 12, 2, University of Colorado Denver, December 1983, pp. 271–385.
- "There's a Madness in the Method: Redefining Citizen Contacting of Government Officials", Urban Affairs Quarterly, 28, 2, December 1992, pp. 297–316.
