= H. T. Wilson =

Social and Political Scientist

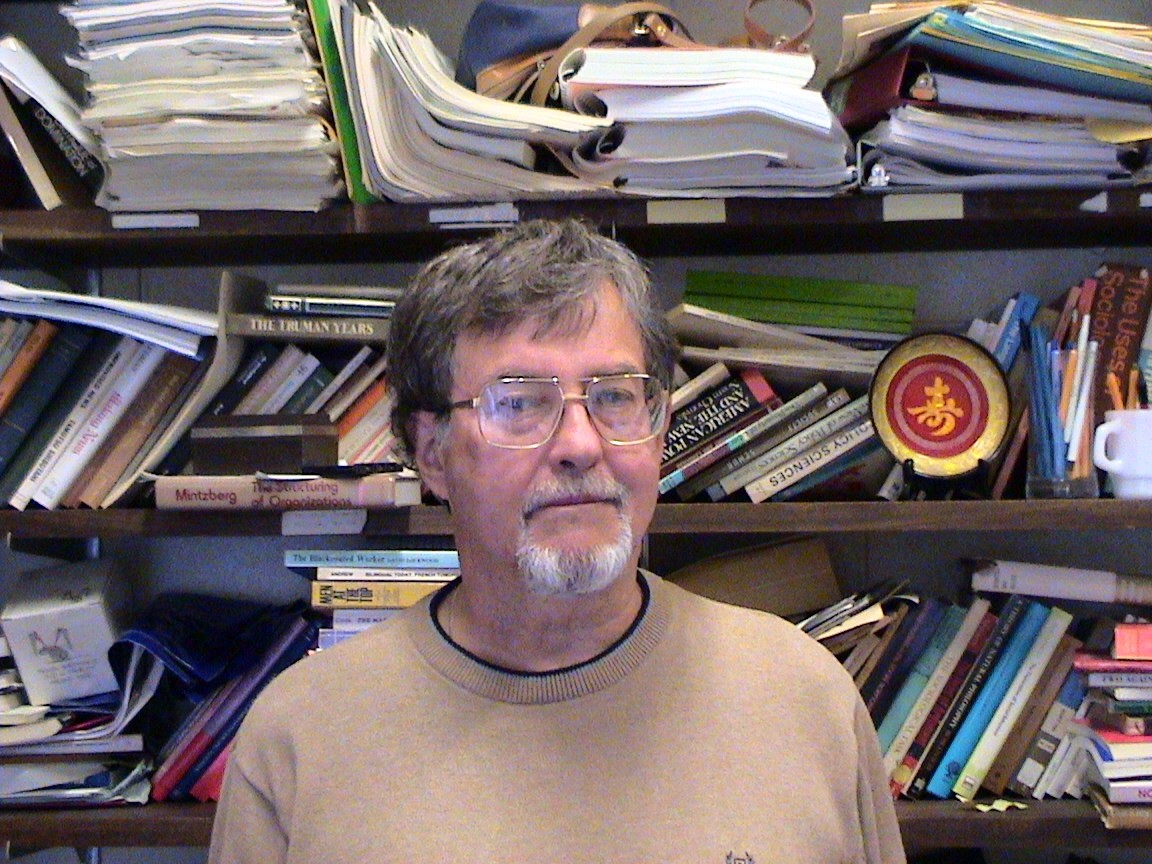
- Born: October 19, 1940 (age 86); Rutland, Vermont, USA
- Education: Tufts University, Rutgers University
- Occupations: Social and Political Theorist

Hall Thomas Wilson (born 19 October 1940) is an American and Canadian social and political theorist and political scientist who is emeritus professor of social and political thought at York University, Toronto. He has taught in the Department of Political Science at Rutgers University (1963–1967) and at York in the Faculties of Graduate Studies and Liberal Arts and Professional Studies (1996–2017) and, earlier, in the Faculties of the Schulich School of Business (1967–1996) and Osgoode Hall Law School (1967–2006). He received his undergraduate degree in Government from Tufts University in 1962 and his Masters and Ph.D. in Political Science from Rutgers University in 1964 and 1968. He was a former director of the Social and Political Thought Program at York University (1988–1991), has supervised or been a member of numerous examining committees in ten graduate programs and is or was on the editorial boards of nine scholarly journals in the fields of political, social and legal theory and the social sciences. He has also been a visiting or adjunct professor at universities in the United Kingdom, Ireland, The Netherlands, Germany, Denmark, Sweden, Australia, Japan, Hong Kong and the United States. Adam Smith, Karl Marx, Max Weber, Thorstein Veblen, Alfred Schutz, Ludwig Wittgenstein, Herbert Marcuse, Theodor W. Adorno, Hannah Arendt and Ivan Illich are among Wilson's main intellectual influences.

He has written extensively on: critical social theory and Marxian thought; political and legal theory; Canadian and American institutions; social theories of sex and gender; innovation in science, technology and everyday life; agency, citizenship and representation, including his theory of bureaucratic representation; adequacy as a goal in social research practice; equity, inclusion and empowerment; and social theories of space, place and time. He is the author, collaborator or editor of more than a dozen books, collections and edited works and numerous journal and periodical articles and review essays.

== Early life, education and later events ==
Wilson was born in Rutland, Vermont, US. During his first 18 years he lived in more than 30 places, experiencing multiple changes in schooling and employment throughout the eastern United States. These experiences are evident in his research on familiarity and strangeness, tradition and innovation and culture and civilization. Being an outsider, stranger or newcomer sensitized him to be accommodating to others who encounter similar challenges, and helped him offer guidance to students in his role as advisor, research supervisor or college fellow. His later discovery of his kinship with the Mohawk of the Six Nations peoples of New York State, Ontario and Quebec influenced his academic and professional commitments after 1980, particularly the egalitarian social and political structure of decision-making in the Haudenosaunee Iroquois Confederacy. He is married to Singai Rani Mohan, originally from Singapore.

Wilson's concerns about the public or private funding of research are evident from the fact that he does not normally apply for grants or other financial support to fund research, but restricts his requests from the university and funding agencies to conference travel, subsistence and sabbaticals. As he notes, “this is a matter of personal preference on my part, and is based on early negative experiences with issues bearing on academic freedom and financial dependency while completing my Ph.D. It is for this reason that I continue to be concerned about the increasing dependence of contemporary social and political scholarship on external private and public sector funding.” This concern emerged from the serious difficulties he and others encountered with political and partisan conflicts over funding while studying controversial topics in the United States during the early and mid-1960s. This led him to be suspicious of prizes, honours and awards, whether from public or private sources, and of grants and emoluments, as a threat to academic integrity.

== Academic work ==
Three themes run through Wilson's research: the emergence under early capitalism of a tendency toward dis-embodiment through the use of mutual observation, a process that becomes formalized and disciplined with the emergence of economics and the other social sciences in the 19th and 20th centuries; an understanding of consciousness as a distributed phenomenon found throughout the body, rather than located solely in the brain; and the critique of the disciplinary bias of social scientists toward generalization through an individualizing method that finds inspiration in Max Weber’s commitment to adequate evidence. These themes reflect Wilson's career-long interest in critical social theory and its practical implementation.

Scholars have found Wilson's theory of bureaucratic representation to be among his most useful contributions. Based on the classic work of Norton Long, Donald J. Kingsley, and Reinhard Bendix and drawing on ideas from Hegel, Marx and Weber, the theory of bureaucratic representation argues that electoral modes of representing individuals, groups and interests remain significant. At the same time, bureaucratic representation, which requires the 'constructive discretion' of civil servants, has become increasingly necessary in order to compensate key deprived elements of the electorate who are significantly underrepresented in advanced industrial societies. The increased role of the state in all three sectors of modern society (capital, public and social) has made this possible while the increasing power of corporations and global-international capital has made it necessary. Capital’s response, in the form of neo-liberal policies of contracting out, privatization and ‘free trade’, is an attempt to blunt or reverse these efforts at representation. Against this trend, Wilson argues that governments can act affirmatively on behalf of public and general interests by encouraging ostensibly neutral civil servants to engage in affirmative action, pay equity, ‘constructive discretion’, and innovative implementation practices.

The theory of bureaucratic representation can also be understood through the theory of public capital, for which Wilson is also well known. This theory builds upon Smith's The Wealth of Nations by combining it with Marx's critique of political economy's labor theory of value. Wilson argues that capitals and capitalism have co-opted individual labor power and used social, cultural, educational and political processes over the past two centuries to obscure what the people do for capitalism while emphasizing instead what capitalism does for the people. This process of ‘socialization’ includes capitals themselves, making attempts to improve the social, economic and political order both more difficult and more necessary. He defines public capital as the past, present and future stock of embedded, existing and potential value, presently organized mainly on a national state basis and comprising a people's history, culture, experience, knowledge, habits, institutions and everyday practices. He claims, further, that the people are being encouraged to use up the store of public capital at a significantly faster rate than they are creating it, thereby privileging private values over public values, exchange values over use values, and work and consumption over a more balanced conception of political economy focussed on leisure rather than simply ‘time off from work’.

These concerns about bureaucratic representation and public capital help to explain Wilson's ongoing preoccupation with the issue of adequacy in social scientific explanation. Drawing on the insights of the critical social theory of the Frankfurt School, he first developed these arguments through a consideration of the dominant methods of carrying out social research in The American Ideology (1977) and Political Management (1985); then in a later book Marx’s Critical/Dialectical Procedure (1991/2015); and the studies over two decades collected in The Vocation of Reason (2004), along with subsequent writings. These studies, done intermittently over more than 50 years (since 1973), formulate the criterion (Weber) and postulate (Schutz) of adequacy as both a conceptual innovation and a practical/strategic demand which gets beyond acknowledging the views of respondents. Wilson insists that the values and understandings of participants must be included in any research or evaluation as a condition of publication or official notification, especially when they cannot agree with researchers or wish to offer their own views and assessments. Wilson's critique of dominant research methods draws on the work of Harold Garfinkel, who stated that such practical activation is essential if social scientists and evaluators are ever to go beyond describing the world of the actor to include the actor's knowledge of the world as well.

These arguments about the limits and possibilities of social science inform Wilson's broader theory of complementarity, which he applies to an analysis of institutions and social relations between the sexes. Complementarity between Canadian and American institutions generally, and more specifically in the area of higher education, helped ensure Canada's survival during the 19th and 20th centuries in the face of its more populous, powerful and sometimes more aggressive neighbour. He argues that Canadian economic, financial, political, governmental, social, cultural, geographic and regional institutions have tended to complement rather than contrast with their counterparts in the United States. By imitating American institutional practices, neo-liberal policies and international agreements jeopardize Canada's autonomy and survival while further entrenching capitalist norms and values globally. Wilson extends these ideas to examine complementarity as a deep reality in social relations between men and women, which he contrasts with the surface appearance of sex as designation and with the division of labor or ‘functional rationality’ more broadly. Wilson argues that the form of duality of complementarity must not be confused with the homogeneous or symmetrical allocation of functions in formal organization and the division of labor, but be understood rather in terms of 'sense of function' and co-operation

Wilson’s concern for the practical implementation of a critical theory, and for research as a form of active reflection, is also evident in his attempt to reconstruct what he refers to as Karl Marx’s ‘critical/dialectical procedure’. This procedure is open-ended and responsive to social reality in a way that is intended to include the challenge of implementation as a part of this process rather than something that is separate and distinct from it. In place of a linear method consisting of a rigid series of steps, it focusses instead on the need to move from abstract concepts, perception and observation toward concrete concepts embodying thought, reflection and discipline, with the sequence of these activities dependent upon the object of inquiry, the circumstances and the individual.

== Publications ==
=== Books ===
1969. The American University and the World of Scholars. (Joint Editor). New Brunswick: Rutgers University Press.

1977. The American Ideology : Science, Technology and Organization as Modes of Rationality in Advanced Industrial Societies. London: Routledge. ISBN 9780710085016.

1980. Social Change, Innovation and Politics in East Asia. (Joint Editor). Hong Kong: Asian Research Institute.

1984. Tradition and Innovation: the Idea of Civilization as Culture and its Significance. London: Routledge. ISBN 0-7102-0009-9.

1985. Political Management: Redefining the Public Sphere. Berlin: De Gruyter. 10.1515/9783110854961-010. ISBN 9783110099027.

1989. Sex and Gender: Making Cultural Sense of Civilization. Leiden: Brill. ISBN 978-90-04-08546-6.

1989. Retreat from Governance: Canada and the Continental-International Challenge. Hull: Voyageur Publishing. ISBN 0921842023.

1991. Marx's Critical/Dialectical Procedure. London: Routledge. ISBN 0-415-05547-4.

1999. No Ivory Tower: The University Under Siege. Ottawa: Voyageur Publishing. ISBN 0-921842-44-9.

2001. Bureaucratic Representation: Civil Servants and the Future of Capitalist Democracies. Leiden: Brill. ISBN 978-90-04-12194-2.

2002. Capitalism after Postmodernism: Neo-conservatism, Legitimacy and the Theory of Public Capital. Leiden: Brill. ISBN 978-90-04-12458-5.

2004. The Vocation of Reason: Studies in Critical Theory and Social Science in the Age of Max Weber. (Thomas M. Kemple ed.). Leiden: Brill. ISBN 978-90-04-13631-1.

2015. Marx's Critical/Dialectical Procedure (Volume 19 ed.). London Library Editions: Marxism ISBN 978-1-138-88696-4 (Volume 19). 10.4324/9781315713830. ISBN 978-1-138-88696-4. (Reprint from 1991 edition: ISBN 0-415-05547-4).

2016. Refugee Trap by Bharathi Mohan (Amazon e-book) (Editor)

2017 Political Management: Redefining the Public Sphere (Berlin: De Gruyter) (Reprint from 1985 edition ISBN 9783110099027).

2023 The American Ideology: Science, Technology and Organization as Modes of Rationality in Advanced Industrial Societies. London: Routledge ISBN 9780710085016. Reissued in Hardbound, Paperback and Digital Form under the Original 1977 Copyright in the Routledge Revivals Series.

2023 Tradition and Innovation: the Idea of Civilization as Culture and its Significance. London: Routledge. ISBN 9781032636511. Reissued in Hardbound, Paperback and Digital Form under the Original 1984 Copyright in the Routledge Revivals Series.

2025 Special Issue titled 'The Postulate of Adequacy: Causality, Meaning, Performativity', in Human Studies 48(4) December 2025, pp 709–911 (One of 3 editors).

Forthcoming Encounters in Canada: Comparing Indigenous, Settler and Immigrant Perspectives (Toronto: University of Toronto Press, forthcoming) (joint editor).

=== Selected journal articles and book chapters ===
1970. "The Academy and its Clients". Report to the Commission on Relations between Universities and Governments.(D. Rowat and R. Hurtubise eds.) Ottawa: University of Ottawa Press.

1972. "’Discretion’ in the Analysis of Administrative Process". Osgoode Hall Law Journal. 10 (1): 117–139.

1973. "Rationality and Decision in Administrative Science". Canadian Journal of Political Science. 6 (3): 271–294. doi:10.1017/S000842390003969X. JSTOR 3231572. S2CID 154436151.

1976. "Reading Max Weber: The Limits of Sociology". Sociology. 10 (2): 297–315. (Reprinted in The Vocation of Reason, 2004, Chapter 1: ISBN 978-90-04-13631-1).

1976. “Science, Critique and Criticism : The “Open Society” Revisited’. In On Critical Theory. (John O’Neill ed.). New York: Seabury Press.

1977. "Attitudes toward Science: Canadian and American Scientists". International Journal of Comparative Sociology. 18 (1–2): 154–175.

1981. "Values: On the Possibility of a Convergence between Economic and Non-Economic Decision-Making'". Management under Differing Value Systems. (G. Dlugos and K. Klaus Weiermair eds.) Berlin: De Gruyter. pp. 37–71. ISBN 9783110085532.

1983. "Anti-Method as a Counter-structure in Social Research Practice". Beyond Method: Strategies for Social Research (Gareth Morgan ed.). London: Sage Publications. pp. 271–294. ISBN 9780803920781.

1986. "Critical theory's critique of social science: Episodes in a changing problematic from Adorno to Habermas, Parts I and II". History of European Ideas. 7(2): 127-147 and 7(3), 287–302. doi:10.1016/0191-6599(86)90068-9 (reprinted in The Vocation of Reason, 2004, Chapter 3: ISBN 978-90-04-13631-1).

1988. "Ordeals of Implementation". Asian Journal of Public Administration. 10 (2): 225–237. doi:10.1080/02598272.1988.10800208.

1988. "Essential Process of Modernity: A Critical Analysis of Social Science Research Practices and an Alternative", International University of Japan Annual Review, Volume 5. Tokyo: IUJ Press: 1-42. ISSN 0910-3643.

1988. "Notes on the Achievement of Communicative Behavior and Related Difficulties", Dialectical Anthropology 12: 285-305

1992 "The Impact of 'Gender' on Critical Theory's Critique of Advanced Industrial Societies", Current Perspectives in Social Theory (Ben Agger, ed). London: JAI Press, pp. 125–136. ISBN 1-55938-442-5.

1992. "Nationalist Ideology and Political Philosophy: the Case of Max Weber". History of European Ideas. 16: 545–550. doi:10.1016/0191-6599(93)90187-U

1997. “Institutional Complementarity and Canadian Identity”, Canadian Review of American Studies, 27(3) (1997), 175–190.

1999. "The Downside of Downsizing: Bureaucratic Representation in Capitalist Democracies". The New Public Management. (D. Barrows and H.I. Macdonald eds.) Toronto: Captus Press. pp. 55–80. ISBN 978-1-896691-95-4.

1999. ‘Time, Space and Value: Recovering the Public Sphere’, Time and Society 8(1), 161-181 (reprinted in The Vocation of Reason, 2004, Chapter 10: ISBN 978-90-04-13631-1).

2004. "La Théorie Critique aux États-Unis (1938-1978)". In La Postérité de l'École de Francfort. (Blanc & Vincent, Alan & Jean-Marie, eds). Paris: Éditions Syllepse. ISBN 2-84797-076-2.

2008. "Bureaucratic Competence as an Essential Factor in Cross-Cultural/Multicultural Program Evaluations". Canadian Journal of Program Evaluation. 23: 93–115.

2011. ‘The Case for Employment Equity’. Approaches to Public Administration: Core Issues and Emerging Responses. (Roberto Leone and F.L.K. Ohemeng eds). Toronto: Emond Montgomery. pp. 257–264. ISBN 978-1-55239-422-9.

2018. "Popper's Conception of Scientific Discovery and its Relation to the Community of Science". The Impact of Critical Rationalism. (R. Sassower and N. Laor eds.) Berlin: Springer Verlag. pp. 273–287. ISBN 978-3-319-90826-7.

2019. "Aboriginally Appropriate Alterations to the Criteria for Determining University Tenure and Promotion: An Extended Justification and Defence in the Light of Conspicuous Failures of Implementation". Canadian Journal of Native Studies. 39 (2): 53–69.

2021. "'Adequacy' as a Goal in Social Research Practice: Classical Formulations and Contemporary Issues". Human Studies. 44 (3): 473–489. doi:10.1007/s10746-021-09602-6. S2CID 238718292.

2022. “Max Weber’s Idea of Social Science in an Age of Formal Rationalization”. In The Routledge International Handbook on Max Weber. (Alan Sica ed.). London: Routledge, pp. 313–323.

2025. "Bureaucratic Representation in the Neo-Weberian State", in Max Weber Studies, edited by S. Whimster, Special Issue: Bureaucracy and Democracy in the Age of Trump (ISSN:1470-8078; April 2025).

2025 'The Causality of Freedom: Max Weber and the Practical Activation of Schutz's Postulate of Adequacy'. Contribution to a Special Issue titled 'The Postulate of Adequacy: Causality, Meaning, Performativity, Human Studies 48(4) December 2025, pp. 743–761.

2026 'The Persistence of 'Social Causation' in Max Weber's Analysis of the Criterion of Adequacy'. Panel Discussant. Conference on 'The Postulate of Adequacy: Causality, Meaning, Performativity' (Konstanz: University of Konstanz, August 3–5, 2026).
