= James W. Fesler =

American political scientist

James William Fesler (March 14, 1911 – April 26, 2005) was an American political scientist who was an expert in public administration and a professor at Yale University.

Fesler was born in Duluth, Minnesota in 1911, completed his bachelor's degree at the University of Minnesota, and then completed a PhD in political science at Harvard University. He was a professor at the University of North Carolina at Chapel Hill from 1935 to 1951, and at Yale University from 1951 until his retirement in 1979.

Fesler's published works included The Independence of State Regulatory Agencies (1942), Area and Administration (1949), which explored state/space theory, The 50 States and Their Local Governments (1968) (with Karl Bosworth), Public Administration: Theory and Practice (1980), American Public Opinion: Patterns of the Past (1982), and The Politics of the Administrative Process (1991) (with Donald Kettl).

Fesler served as vice president of the American Political Science Association, associate editor of the American Political Science Review, and editor-in-chief of the Public Administration Review. He received the Dwight Waldo Award from the American Society for Public Administration in 1986 for his contributions to the literature on public administration, and received the John Gaus Award from the American Political Science Association in 1988. In 1984, a book was published in his honor, edited by Robert Golembiewski and Aaron Wildavsky, called The Costs of Federalism: In Honor of James W. Fesler.

In addition to his scholarship, Fesler worked in public service, serving on President Roosevelt's National Resources Planning Board and then on the War Production Board during World War II. In Connecticut, he was a consultant to Governor Ella Grasso and to New Haven Mayor Richard C. Lee.
