= Philip Coulter =

Philip Coulter may refer to:

- Phil Coulter (born 1942), Irish musician, songwriter and record producer
- Philip B. Coulter (born 1939), American political scientist
