= David John Farmer =

American philosopher

- Born: 1935; United Kingdom
- Known for: Anti-administration theory Epistemic pluralism Post-traditionalism; Thinking as play

Academic background
- Education: London School of Economics; University of London; University of Toronto; University of Virginia
- Doctoral advisor: James Cargile
- Influences: Max Weber Woodrow Wilson Tommy Douglas Dwight Waldo Jacques Derrida Michel Foucault Jean Baudrillard Félix Guattari Gilles Deleuze Frederick Winslow Taylor Luther Gulick Mary Parker Follett Chester Barnard Herbert A. Simon

Academic work
- Discipline: Public Policy, Public Administration, Philosophy, Political Science
- Institutions: London School of Economics; University of London; University of Toronto; University of Virginia; Virginia Commonwealth University
- Influenced: Charles Goodsell Norma M. Riccucci Patrick V. Murphy Michael Lipsky

David John Farmer is a professor emeritus of philosophy and public affairs in the L. Douglas Wilder School of Government and Public Affairs at Virginia Commonwealth University. He is best known for his publications on post-traditional governance theory and practice – especially on macro public administration and public policy. He has also published on the philosophy and foundations of economics, on the metaphysics of time and on criminal justice policy and management. Post-traditional conceptual approaches analyzed in his writings include thinking as play, justice as seeking, practice as art, reflexive language, imaginization, anti-administration, deterritorialization, and epistemic pluralism.

The contents of some of the books are indicated under their titles – including To Kill the King, The Language of Public Administration, Public Administration in Perspective, Being in Time, and Crime Control. The reference section lists these and others of his works. Dr. Farmer has also contributed to the fields of post-traditional governance theory and practice through many book chapters and articles.

== Early life and education ==
He began his university education at the London School of Economics, University of London. He obtained a master's degree in economics from the University of Toronto and a master's degree in philosophy at the University of Virginia. He was awarded two Ph.D. degrees. His Ph.D. in Economics is from the University of London (1984), and his Ph.D. in Philosophy is from the University of Virginia (1989).

His father Joseph worked for most of his life in the Research and Development Department of the Bristol Aeroplane Company. His father's influence included not only interest in the Brabazon Airplane, but also playing Chess and participating in discussion groups. His mother, Gladys, died when he was three years old. Farmer's interests in his pre-teen years included reading about basic archaeology and astronomy, playing chess, and school.

== Career ==
Farmer's academic appointments at Virginia Commonwealth University included being Professor of Philosophy and Public Affairs (2003-2015); Professor of Political Science and Public Administration (1994-2003); Professor of Public Administration (1986-1994); Professor of Administration of Justice and Public Safety (1980-1991), including 1982-1991 as Chair; and Affiliate Professor of Philosophy (1992-2003). The main achievement has been the development and application of post-traditional analysis, as explained in The Language of Public Administration, To Kill the King, and Public Administration in Practice and in such concepts as thinking as play, ethics as seeking, practice as art, deconstruction, epistemic pluralism, neuro-gov., un-engineering, anti-administration, the practicality of poetry, and the allure of rhetoric.

His practitioner experience included being Division Director, National Institute of Justice, U.S. Department of Justice (1974-1980); Director of Operations Management and Special Assistant to the Police Commissioner, New York City Police Department (1971-1974); Management Consultant at The Jacobs Company, Planning Research Corporation (1970-1971); Management Consultant, Public Administration Service (1965-1970); Chief, Methods Research and other positions, Ontario Provincial Government (1962-1965); and Administrative Analyst, Budget Bureau, Saskatchewan Government, 1960-1961.

Farmer was Director of the Police Division at the Federal Government's National Institute of Justice (within the U.S. Department of Justice and until 1978 named National Institute of Law Enforcement and Criminal Justice), and he had a staff of some five people. His main function was to recommend the expenditure of research grants to help upgrade policing. The police research budget was approximately $3 million to spend in the first year ($18 million in 2025 dollars). His work included what he discussed in articles and talks about what was called the possibility of a Research Revolution in Policing.

Previously Farmer had been Special Assistant to the Police Commissioner in the New York City Police Department (1971-1974). As an example of a non-useful but even more pleasant activity, there was the night of November 14–15, 1972, when Farmer was - as certified in a certificate signed by Mayor John V. Lindsey - night mayor for the city of New York. The job was to stay throughout the night in City Hall and notify the Mayor by telephone if any crisis arose: nothing happened during Farmer's night - zero.

In previous years, Farmer worked for two Chicago management consulting organizations - Public Administration Service and The Jacobs Company. Public Administration Service had long been located at 1313 East 60th Street - a distinguished road built for the 1893 Chicago World's Fair. When he arrived in 1965, it consisted of 21 nonprofit institutions - including PAS. He provided management consulting services about organization and methods, human resources such as salaries and classifications, and other governmental issues. Client public agencies that Farmer worked for included the state of Montana; city of Tacoma, Washington; city of Atlanta, Georgia; New York State Conference of Mayors; Milwaukee city and county, Wisconsin; Kansas City, Missouri; city of Moberly, Missouri; city of Cedar Rapids, Iowa; city of Joliet, Illinois; Plymouth Township, Pennsylvania; Georgia Institute of Technology, Atlanta, Georgia; Evanston Public Library, Evanston, Illinois; city of Independence, Missouri; Maryland State Department of education; the state of Illinois; Grand Rapids, Michigan; city of Denver, Colorado; and Sterling Heights, Michigan. The Jacobs Company (which became part of Planning Research Corporation) also provided consulting services to governments. Tom Jacobs had once worked with Chicago's Mayor Richard J. Daley. Farmer's management consulting work was mainly for cities in the Model Cities Program. It was conducted, therefore, for the federal government's Department of Housing and Urban Development: HUD was the client. Cities to which Farmer was assigned to provide management consultation included Salt Lake City, Utah; Reading, Pennsylvania; Laredo, Texas; and Los Angeles, California.

Farmer's experience also extended to governmental and public administration consulting services outside the United States - in Canada and Australia. Farmer worked for the Saskatchewan Provincial Budget Bureau as a budget and administrative analyst, which he held from April 1960 to August 1961. In Farmer's words, the Budget Bureau had developed a "solid reputation and had long attracted talented staff." Some of Budget Bureau staff would later come to be known as the "Saskatchewan Mafia," a term of endearment with no connection with criminality but highlighting practical management effectiveness. At the budget bureau, Farmer worked as a budget analyst on a quarter of Saskatchewan's budget; he conducted an organization and methods study for one of the government departments; and he wrote a book on the stated functions of the different parts of the government's administrative structure. Farmer worked with the Budget Bureau while Thomas Clement Douglas was premier of Saskatchewan. Douglas, a political forerunner to Bernie Sanders, was premier of Saskatchewan from 1944 to 1961, leading the Co-operative Commonwealth Federation Party (the predecessor to the New Democratic Party) and was most notably a democratic socialist. His government was the first democratic socialist government in North America, and subsequently introduced the first single-payer Medicare system to the continent in 1962. It is in this environment that one can see Farmer's later academic thinking on equity. To be part of a governmental process with the intent to provide a healthcare system and to be part of a provincial government so against the traditional grain of the time speaks volumes to his later work. However, suggestive of the other side of the political spectrum, Farmer has long been a member of the International Churchill Society. His understanding of political and other disciplinary perspectives (e.g., post-traditional, neuroscience, philosophical and historical perspectives) have been influenced in part by studying and by individuals. The latter include his wife (Dr. Rosemary Lee Farmer, a Professor of Social Work whose publications include a book on the relevance of neuroscience).

In September 1961, Farmer took a position with the Treasury Department of the Australian Federal Government, where, according to Farmer, he did “nothing of significance” beyond learning. Two months later in December 1961, he left, and would eventually take a position with the Ontario Provincial Government. Farmer worked as an economist at the Ontario Civil Service Commission from June 1962 to May 1963. In June of 1963, he became an organization and methods analyst with the Ontario Treasury Department's Organization and Methods Services, which he held until May 1964. The Ontario Department of Economics and Development appointed Farmer to be the Chief of Methods Research in June 1964, a position Farmer held until October 1965. During his time with the Ontario provincial government, Farmer began pursuing a Masters in Economics degree from the University of Toronto. He received his M.A. in Economics in 1964, and his dissertation (Canadian Masters Thesis) was on the origins of the English National Health Service. It was also during the latter period that Farmer worked for the Chief Economist of the Ontario Government, then Hugh Ian McDonald.

In 1980 Farmer joined the faculty of Virginia Commonwealth University's Department of Administration of Justice and Public Safety in the School of Community and Public Affairs. He initially taught four classes, then became chair and taught two graduate-level courses and served on various committees within the university. While a faculty member at Virginia Commonwealth University, Farmer received his two doctorates in 1984 and in 1989. While working on his second Ph.D., he was exposed to the French Postmodernist philosophers of the period - Jacques Derrida, Michel Foucault, Jean Baudrillard, among others. These influences contributed significantly to the evolution of the post-traditional theory in Farmer's writings, notably the Language of Public Administration (1995), and can also be seen throughout his later works To Kill the King (2005), Public Administration in Perspective (2010), and Beyond Public Administration: Contemplating and Nudging Government-in-Context (2020).

Dr. Robert Cunningham (University of Tennessee, Knoxville) wrote that Farmer "sets his ideas on the high road, the big picture, and implications for the future, adhering to the principle that ideas should be explained as simply as possible without distorting the reality..." (Cunningham, 2009, 302). Dr. Gary Marshall (University of Nebraska at Omaha) wrote that "Within public administration and political science, David Farmer is a mentor to many and an inspiration to all who know him." (G. Marshall, 2011, p. 1)

The International Journal of Organization Theory and Behavior twice devoted its entire issue (e.g. in 2016) to Farmer's work. Ten articles were contributed by academics from various parts of the world (e.g., from the United States and from China and Argentina), practitioners and former doctoral students. It described and illustrated the breadth and depth of Farmer's iconic contributions to post-traditional public administration theory and practice. In the closing article, Orion White concluded that “David Farmer’s monumental contribution is to have laid the foundation stone from which a new Public Administration culture can be built.” Articles included those titled “What is Newark?” “Applying Farmer’s Lenses: Two Illustrations,” “Of Rhizomes and Pointillism: David John Farmer’s Influence,” “The Practicality of Poetic Contemplation: A Reflection on David Farmer as a Methodologist,” and “David Farmer’s Body of Work: A Retrospective and Prospective View.

== Books ==
=== Post-Traditional Public Administration Theory: For Better Governmental Praxis ===
This 2021 book is a compendium of previously published chapters from Administrative Theory and Praxis with an introduction by Farmer. The postmodern is a common point of departure for the 13 papers in this book as the writers explore topics relevant to public administration and policy-making. Postmodernism is one of the philosophical meta-frameworks that offers profound insights - as well as difficulties - not only for social and political understanding but also for thinking and practice in interpreting and addressing the macro and longer-term problematics of bureaucracy.

=== Beyond Public Administration: Contemplating and Nudging Government-in-Context ===
This 2020 book asks the reader to contemplate how public administration (P.A.) or other discipline can provide leadership in helping American government to govern fundamentally better in terms of policy. Government-in-context, meaning government-in-totality, is useful for contemplation and nudging. It explains contemplation of the powerfully constricting contextual features of a mal-trinity of infiltration, exfiltration, and post-truth. Practical plans for P.A. leadership to assist in impacting the mal-trinity are explained in terms of 18 sets of aims or nudges. Nudge is a term associated with the prods used in Behavioral Economics, and a nudge used in this book can be a prod, a shove, or a hammer blow. Four tentative P.A. leadership stages (or steps) are proposed and described.

=== To Kill the King: Post-traditional Governance and Bureaucracy ===
This 2005 book discusses a post-traditional consciousness that aims to revitalize governance and bureaucracy. To Kill the King explains such consciousness in terms of three concepts analyzed as thinking as play, justice as seeking, and practice as art. It describes a post-traditional consciousness of governance that can yield improvements in the quality of life for each individual and for future generations. The publisher claims that the book aims to "capture the heart, and enlarge the soul, of reform movements within the study of governance and bureaucracy." O.C. McSwite, formerly of Virginia Tech and George Washington Universities, wrote: "I consider this book to be a major and distinctive contribution to the field of public administration and to the discourse about the future of government in the United States as well" (O.C. McSwite, 2009, p. 303).

=== Papers on the Art of Anti-Administration ===
The postmodern is a common point of departure for the 13 papers in this 1998 book as the writers explore topics relevant to public administration and policy-making. Postmodernism is one of the philosophical meta-frameworks that offers profound insights - as well as difficulties - not only for social and political understanding but also for thinking and practice in interpreting and addressing the macro and longer-term problematics of bureaucracy. /ref>

=== The Language of Public Administration: Bureaucracy, Modernity and Postmodernity. ===
This 1995 book argues that modern public administration theory, although valuable, is limiting as an explanatory and catalytic force in resolving problems about the functioning of public bureaucracy and in transforming public bureaucracy into a more positive force. The Language of Public Administration (1995) specifies a reflexive language paradigm for public administration thinking. It aims to show how the study and practice of public administration can be reinvigorated. Dr. Alexander Kouzmin (Southern Cross University and University of South Australia) writes that “Unrivalled by peers, Dr. Farmer has a vibrant language of public administration transgressing what is sayable and what is un-sayable (A. Kouzmin, 2011, p. 803). The Language of Public Administration was listed as one of the candidate books for “great books of public administration, 1990-2010” (Meier & O’Toole, 2012, p. 890).

The Language of Public Administration has been translated into Chinese and Korean. It was translated into Chinese in 2005. The Korean translation was published in 1999 by Pakyoung Publishing Company.

=== Public Administration in Perspective: Theory and Practice through Multiple Lenses ===
The 2010 book explains and illustrates how public administration can benefit from epistemic pluralism – just as can any other action or social science discipline, currently operating essentially within its own disciplinary cul-de-sac. Public Administration in Perspective (2010) explains that epistemic refers to knowing; pluralism refers to more than one way. The book offers an example of a grand strategy of epistemic pluralism. It examines public administration theory and practice from perspectives that include a traditional, a business, an economic, a political, a critical theory, a post-structural, a psychoanalytic, a neuroscience, a feminist, an ethical, and a data lens. It begins by quoting Dwight Waldo’s claim that “administrative thought must establish a working relationship with every major province in the realm of human learning.” Dr. Breena Coates (California State University, San Bernardino) writes about Public Administration in Perspective that the “author provides unique and, hitherto, unexplored perspectives from which to view the multiple faces of public administration… The book’s scholarship is compelling and hard to resist… Today in our networked, globalized environment we are more than ever coming to the realization that there is an interdisciplinary basis for understanding truth, and that each discrete branch of knowledge studies a mere subset of particularized knowledge streams” (B. Coates, 2012, p. 133.)

=== Being in Time: The Nature of Time in Light of McTaggart's Paradox ===
Following and analyzing the philosopher John McTaggart, this 1990 book discusses two views or conceptions of time. One corresponds to the 'ordinary' position, and the other to the 'received wisdom' position of Bertrand Russell and Albert Einstein. Avoiding such prejudicial titles, the two views are called the tensed (the A-theory) and the tenseless (the B-theory) conceptions of time. The varied ways in which philosophers have fleshed out the specifics of the tensed and tenseless views are contemplated in the book.

=== Crime Control: The Use and Misuse of Police Resources ===
The 1984 book presents a comprehensive examination of police resources allocation decision making and documents research indicating opportunities for better utilization of police resources. The publisher of this 1984 book (Crime Control) claims that the book should be read by "those working in the fields of law and society, criminology, sociology, political science, criminal law, and criminal justice." The former N.Y.P.D. Police Commissioner Patrick V. Murphy wrote of this book that “In recent years, American policing has benefited greatly from the observations and analyses of scholars and researchers, particularly when they have had on-line experience in police agencies at one or another stage in their careers. David J. Farmer is a scholar who has had such experience, which adds a special dimension to his observations and conclusions” (Patrick V. Murphy, 1984, p. vii.)
