= Larry Farmer =

Larry Farmer may refer to:

- Larry Farmer (basketball) (born 1951), former men's head basketball coach at UCLA and Loyola University Chicago
- Larry Farmer (law professor) (born 1942), professor at Brigham Young University
