= Robert Kravchuk =

American academic

- Born: July 4, 1955 (age 71); Stamford, Connecticut, U.S.

Academic background
- Education: University of Connecticut; University of Hartford; Columbia University; Syracuse University
- Thesis: Liberalism and the administrative state: The phenomenology of governmental legitimation in everyday life (1989)

Robert Sacha Kravchuk (born July 4, 1955) is an American scholar known in the fields of public administration and public finances, as well as because of his expertise on Ukraine. He is the former director of the Master of Public Affairs program at the Indiana University School of Public and Environmental Affairs. Kravchuk is a fellow of the National Academy of Public Administration. As an author, he is held in libraries worldwide.

== Education ==
Kravchuk attended to the University of Connecticut where he obtained the degrees of Bachelor of Arts in economics, and Bachelor of Science, cum laude, in business administration in 1977. He then earned a MPA in public administration at the University of Hartford in 1980, and an MBA in finance and business economics at the Columbia University in 1981. After a brief career in the private sector as financial analyst and manager at Cigna and consultant at Booz Allen Hamilton, Kravchuk went back to school to earn a Master of Arts (1987) and PhD (1989) in political science from the Maxwell School at Syracuse University.

== Career ==
Between 1990 and 1993, Kravchuk was an assistant professor at the University of Hartford, and served as deputy budget director of the State of Connecticut between 1991 and 1992. In 1994, he moved to the University of Connecticut. Between 1993 and 1996, Kravchuk worked part-time for the US Department of Treasury in mission to provide financial advice to the governments of Ukraine and Bosnia-Herzegovina. In 1998, Kravchuk was named associate professor at the Indiana University School of Public and Environmental Affairs (SPEA) as well as an affiliate to the university's Russian and Eastern European Institute. During his first stance at SPEA, Kravchuk authored three books on Ukrainian politics and economics, and joined David H. Rosenbloom as a co-author of his Public Administration textbook.

Between 2007 and 2012, Kravchuk was a full professor at the University of North Carolina - Charlotte and the chair of its department of political science and public administration. In 2012, Kravchuk returned to SPEA as a professor and director of its program of Master of Public Affairs. Under his leadership, SPEA's MPA program became the top ranked in the country, according to US News.

== Publications ==
Besides two dozens of academic journal articles and a dozen of academic book chapters, Kravchuk is the author of the following books:

- Politics and Society in Ukraine (1999, co-authored with Paul D'Anieri and Taras Kuzio)
- State and Institution Building in Ukraine (1999, co-authored with Paul D'Anieri and Taras Kuzio)
- Ukrainian Political Economy: The First Ten Years (2002)
- Public Administration: Understanding Management, Politics and Law in the Public Sector (from 6th edition in 2005, co-authored with David Rosenbloom)
