= Saskia Sassen =

Dutch-American sociologist (born 1947)

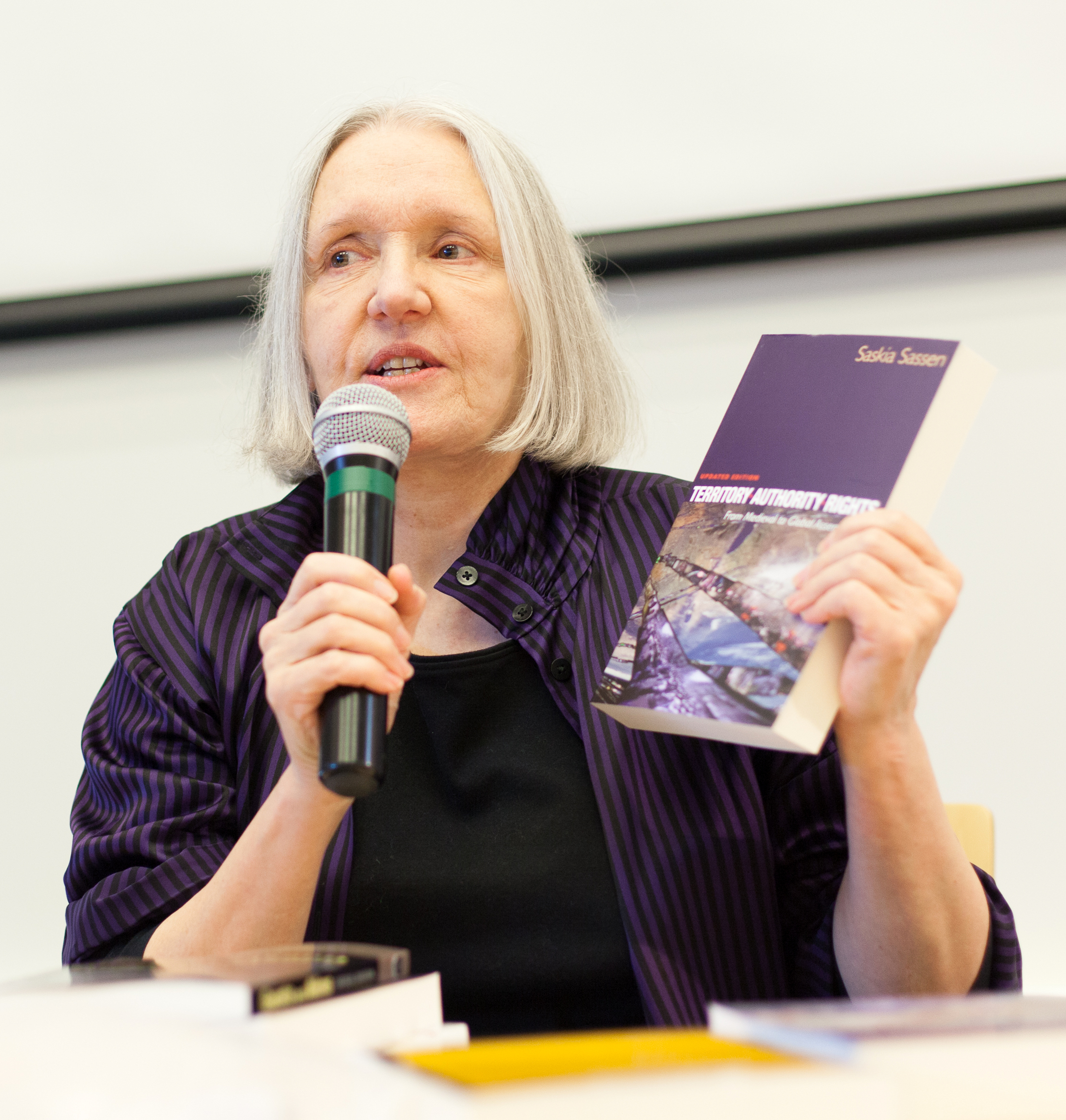
- Sassen in 2012
- Born: January 5, 1947 (age 79); The Hague, Netherlands
- Education: University of Notre Dame
- Known for: Studies of globalization, world cities, and international migration, State/Space theory
- Spouse: Richard Sennett (m. 1987)
- Scientific career
- Fields: Sociology, economics
- Workplaces: Columbia University, London School of Economics
- Thesis: Non-dominant ethnic populations as a possible component of the U.S. political economy: the case of Blacks and Chicanos (1974)
- Website: www.saskiasassen.com

Saskia Sassen (born January 5, 1947) is a Dutch-American sociologist noted for her analyses of globalization and international human migration. She is a professor of sociology at Columbia University in New York City, and the London School of Economics. The term global city was coined and popularized by Sassen in her 1991 work The Global City: New York, London, Tokyo.

== Education ==
From 1966, Sassen spent a year each at the Université de Poitiers, France, the Università degli Studi di Roma, and the University of Buenos Aires, for studies in philosophy and political science. From 1969, Sassen studied sociology and economics at the University of Notre Dame, Indiana, United States where she obtained a M.A. in 1971 and a Ph.D. degree in 1974, under the direction of Fabio Dasilva. She also received a master's degree in philosophy from the University of Poitiers in 1974.

== Academic posts ==
After being a post-doctoral fellow at the Center for International Affairs at Harvard University, Sassen held various academic positions in and outside the US, such as the Ralph Lewis Professor of Sociology at the University of Chicago. She is currently Robert S. Lynd Professor of Sociology at Columbia University and Centennial Visiting professor of Political Economy in the Department of Sociology at the London School of Economics.

During the 1980s and 1990s, Sassen emerged as a prolific author in urban sociology. She studied the impacts of globalisation such as economic restructuring, and how the movements of labour and capital influence urban life. She also studied the influence of communication technology on governance. Sassen observed how nation states begin to lose power to control these developments, and she studied increasing general transnationalism, including transnational human migration. She identified and described the phenomenon of the global city. Her 1991 book bearing this title made her a widely quoted author on globalisation. An updated edition of her book was published in 2001. In the early 2000s, Sassen focused on immigration and globalization, with her "denationalization" and "transnationalism" projects (see Bibliography and External Links, below). Her books have been translated into 21 languages. Committee on Italian, European and International Criminal Procedure – Ibrerojur.

== Personal life ==
Sassen was born in The Hague, Netherlands in 1947. In 1948, Sassen's parents, Willem Sassen, a Dutch collaborator, Nazi journalist and member of the Waffen-SS, and Miep van der Voort, moved to Argentina and the family lived in Buenos Aires. Saskia Sassen spent part of her youth in Italy and says she was "brought up in five languages."

She is married to sociologist Richard Sennett.

== Honors and awards ==
- In January 2004, Sassen received the honoris causa degree in urbanism at Delft University of Technology.
- In 2013, she received the Premio Princesa de Asturias in social sciences.
- In 2014, she received the honoris causa degree at Universidad de Murcia (Spain) and École normale supérieure (Paris).
- In 2016, she received the honoris causa degree at Universitat de València (Spain).
- In 2017, she received the honoris causa degree at Universidad de Guadalajara (Mexico).

== Works ==
=== Authored books ===
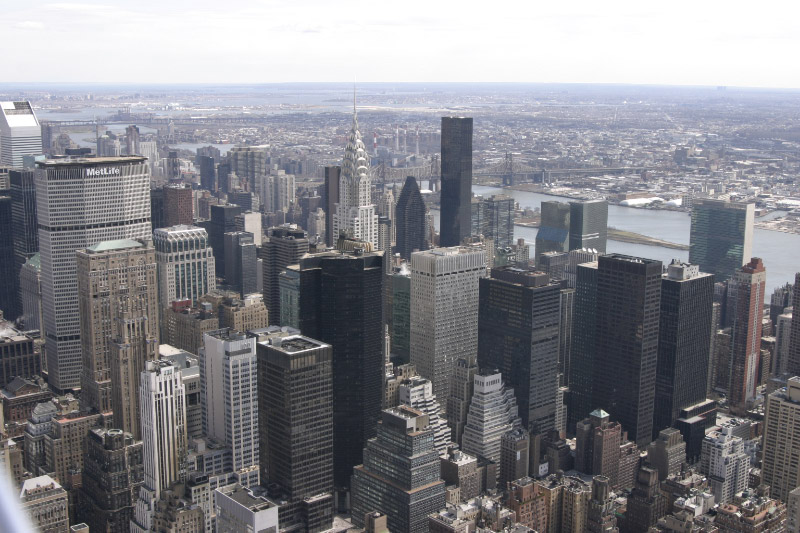
Sassen's 1991 book The Global City charts how New York, along with London and Tokyo, became the most important cities in the global economy.

- The Global City: New York, London, Tokyo (Princeton: Princeton University Press, 2001) 2nd ed., original 1991;ISBN 0-691-07063-6.
- The Mobility of Labor and Capital. A Study in International Investment and Labor Flow (Cambridge: Cambridge University Press, 1988) ISBN 0-521-38672-1.
- Cities in a World Economy (Thousand Oaks, Calif. : Pine Forge Press, 2018) updated 5th ed., original 1994; Series: Sociology for a new century, ISBN 1-4129-3680-2.
- Losing control? Sovereignty in An Age of Globalization (New York: Columbia University Press, 1996) Series : University seminars — Leonard Hastings Schoff memorial lectures, ISBN 0-231-10608-4.
- Globalization and its discontents. Essays on the New Mobility of People and Money (New York: New Press, 1998), ISBN 1-56584-518-8.
- Guests and aliens (New York: New Press, 1999) ISBN 1-56584-608-7.
- The global city : New York, London, Tokyo (Princeton : Princeton University Press, 2001) updated 2d ed., original 1991; ISBN 0-691-07063-6.
- Territory, Authority, Rights: From Medieval to Global Assemblages (Princeton: Princeton University Press, May 2006) ISBN 0-691-09538-8. Awards for TAR: Winner of the 2007, Distinguished Book Award, Political Economy of the World-System Section, by ASA; Winner of the 2007 Robert Jervis and Paul Schroeder Best Book Award, International History and Politics section, by APSA
- Elements for a Sociology of Globalization [or A Sociology of Globalization] (W.W. Norton, 2007) ISBN 0-393-92726-1.
- Expulsions: Brutality and Complexity in the Global Economy (Cambridge, MA: Belknap Press, 2014) ISBN 978-0674599222.

=== Edited books ===
- Global networks, linked cities, ed. Saskia Sassen (New York : Routledge, 2002) ISBN 0-415-93162-2, ISBN 0-415-93163-0.
- Digital Formations: IT and New Architectures in the Global Realm, eds. Robert Latham and Saskia Sassen (Princeton: Princeton University Press, 2005) ISBN 0-691-11986-4, ISBN 0-691-11987-2.
- Deciphering the Global: Its Scales, Spaces and Subjects (New York: Routledge, 2007).

=== Book chapters ===
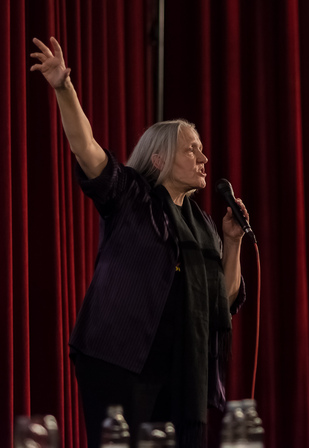
Saskia Sassen at the Subversive Festival

- "Mediating practices : women with/in cyberspace", in eds. John Armitage and Joanne Roberts, Living with cyberspace : technology & society in the 21st century (London : Athlone; New York : Continuum, 2002) viii, 203 p., ISBN 0-485-00444-5, ISBN 0-485-00636-7, ISBN 0-8264-6035-6, ISBN 0-8264-6036-4.
- "Beyond sovereignty: de facto transnationalism in immigration policy", in eds. Friedmann, Jonathan and Randeria, Shalini, Worlds on the move : globalization, migration, and cultural security (London; New York : Tauris 2004) xix, 372 p., 24 см, Series : Toda institute book series on global peace and policy 6, ISBN 1-86064-951-3.
- "Electronic markets and activist networks: The weight of social logics in digital formations", in Digital Formations: IT and New Architectures in the Global Realm, eds. Robert Latham and Saskia Sassen (Princeton: Princeton University Press, 2005) ISBN 0-691-11986-4, ISBN 0-691-11987-2, p. 54-88.
- "When Places Have Deep Economic Histories", in eds. Goldsmith, Stephen and Elizabeth, Lynne, What We See: Advancing the Observations of Jane Jacobs (Oakland, CA : New Village Press 2010) pp 263 – 275, ISBN 978-0-9815593-1-5.

=== Articles ===
- "Embedded borderings: making new geographies of centrality", Territory, Politics, Governance, March 2017.
- "How Population Lies : True, big cities no longer draw big numbers. But that doesn't mean their power is slipping too.", Newsweek International, July 3–10, 2006.
- "Predatory Formations Dressed in Wall Street Suits and Algorithmic Math", Science, Technology & Society, February 2017.
- "'One of the most culturally diverse cities in the UK': Saskia Sassen on Manchester ", City Metric, June 2017.
- "Migration policy: from control to governance : In the United States and Europe alike, immigration policy isn't working -- and the failure is most evident at the crossing-points of the rich and poor worlds, from the Mexican border to the Canary Islands.", openDemocracy (July 13, 2006).
- "The repositioning of citizenship and alienage: Emergent subjects and spaces for politics", Globalizations, volume 2, number 1, (2005), p. 79-94.
- "Regulating Immigration in a Global Age: A New Policy Landscape", Parallax, volume 11, number 1 (2005), p. 35-45.
- "Comment: We seem to have forgotten history", The Guardian (February 26, 2004).
- "Going Beyond the National State in the USA: The Politics of Minoritized Groups in Global Cities", Diogenes, volume 51, number 3 (2004), p. 59-65.
- "The new lords of Africa", in The Guardian July 9, 2003; also in Peacework, volume 30, number 338, September 2003, p20-21, ISSN 0748-0725.
- ""A message from the global south," (Special report: Terrorism in the US), The Guardian (September 12, 2001).
- "Special report: refugees in Britain — Unstoppable immigrants", in The Guardian (September 12, 2000).
- "Home truths: The notion that the west is threatened with mass invasions of immigrants is a myth," (Refugees in Britain: special report), The Guardian (Saturday April 15, 2000).
- "Women's burden : counter-geographies of globalization and the feminization of survival", Journal of international affairs, [New York], volume 53, number 2, p. 504-524 (2000), ISSN 0022-197X.
- Cities : between global actors and local conditions (College Park, MD. : Urban Studies and Planning Program, University of Maryland, c1999) "The 1997 Lefrak monograph".
- "Beyond Sovereignty: De-Facto Transnationalism in Immigration Policy", in European Journal of Migration and Law, volume 1, p. 177-198, 1999; also published as The De-facto Transnationalizing of Immigration Policy (Florence: Robert Schuman Centre at the European University Institute, 1996).
- "Global financial centers", in Foreign affairs, [New York], volume 78, number 1, p. 75-87 (1999), ISSN 0015-7120.
- The De-facto Transnationalizing of Immigration Policy (Florence: Robert Schuman Centre at the European University Institute, 1996); [also published as "Beyond Sovereignty: De-Facto Transnationalism in Immigration Policy", in European Journal of Migration and Law, volume 1, 1999, p. 177-198.]
- Transnational economies and national migration policies (Amsterdam : Institute for Migration and Ethnic Studies, University of Amsterdam, 1996), ISBN 90-5589-038-3.
- "Analytic borderlands : race, gender and representation in the new city", in ed. King, Anthony D., Re-presenting the city : ethnicity, capital, and culture in the 21st-century metropolis (New York : New York University Press, 1996) p. 183-202, ISBN 0-8147-4678-0, ISBN 0-8147-4679-9.
- [with Morita, Kiriro], "The New illegal immigration in Japan 1980-1992", in The international migration review (New York : Center for Migration Studies, 1994), volume 28, number 1, p. 153-163, ISSN 0197-9183.
- [with Smith, Robert] Post-industrial employment and third world immigration : casualization and the New Mexican migration in New York (New York, N.Y. : Columbia University, Institute of Latin American and Iberian Studies, 1991) Series : Papers on Latin America #26.
- New York City's informal economy (Los Angeles, Calif. : University of California Los Angeles, Institute for Social Science Research, [1988?]) Series : ISSR working papers in the social sciences, 1988–89, volume 4, number 9.
- "Globalization or denationalization?" Review of International Political Economy : RIPE, 10(1), 1–22

=== Dissertations ===
- [as Sassen-Koob, Saskia] Non-dominant ethnic populations as a possible component of the U.S. political economy : the case of blacks and Chicanos (Dissertation, Ph.D., University of Notre Dame, 1974).
- [as Sassen-Koob, Saskia] Social stratification, ethnicity and ideology : Anglos and Chicanos in the United States (Thesis, M.A., University of Notre Dame, 1971).

== See also ==
- Globalization
- Human migration
- International trade
- Nation states
- Rural depopulation
- Sociology
- Transnationalism
- Urbanization
