= John Farmer =

John Farmer may refer to:

- John Farmer (composer) (c. 1570–c. 1601), Renaissance composer of madrigals
- John Farmer (author) (1789–1838), American historian and genealogist
- John Farmer (cartographer) (1798–1859), Detroit-based mapmaker
- John Farmer (1835–1901), music teacher at Harrow School
- John Stephen Farmer (1854–1916), lexicographer and spiritualist
- John Bretland Farmer (1865–1944), botanist
- John Farmer (artist) (1897–1989), Australian artist
- John Hind Farmer (1917–2012), SOE Agent, MI6 Agent
- John Farmer (footballer) (born 1947), English footballer who played for Stoke City
- John Farmer Jr. (born 1957), Attorney General, acting governor of New Jersey, and law school dean
- John Q. Farmer (1823–1904), Minnesota politician and jurist
