= Public Administration Review =

- Discipline: Public administration
- Language: English
- Edited by: Jos Raadschelders, Katherine Willoughby

Publication details
- History: 1940–present
- Publisher: Wiley-Blackwell on behalf of the American Society for Public Administration (United States)
- Frequency: Bimonthly
- Impact factor: 4.9 (2024)

Standard abbreviations
- ISO 4: Public Adm. Rev.

Indexing
- ISSN: 0033-3352 (print); 1540-6210 (web)
- JSTOR: 00333352
- OCLC no.: 817607936

Links
- Journal homepage; Online access; Online archive

Public Administration Review is a bimonthly peer-reviewed academic journal the field of public administration. It was established in 1940 and has been one of the top-rated journals in the field. It is the official journal of the American Society for Public Administration and is published by Wiley-Blackwell. The co-editors-in-chief are Jos Raadschelders Ohio State University and Katherine Willoughby University of Georgia. According to the Journal Citation Reports, the journal has a 2022 impact factor of 8.3, ranking it 2nd out of 49 journals in the category "Public Administration".

== Editors-in-chief ==
The following persons have been editors-in-chief:

- 2018–2023: Jeremy L. Hall
- 2018–2020: R. Paul Battaglio
- 2012–2017: James L. Perry
- 2006–2011: Richard J. Stillman II
- 2000–2005: Larry D. Terry
- 1997–1999: Irene S. Rubin
- 1991–1996: David H. Rosenbloom
- 1985–1990: Chester A. Newland
- 1977–1984: Louis C. Gawthrop
- 1966–1977: Dwight Waldo
- 1963–1966: Vincent Ostrom
- 1961–1963: John A. Perkins
- 1958–1960: James W. Fesler
- 1956–1958: York Wilbern
- 1953–1956: Frederick C. Mosher
- 1951–1953: Wallace S. Sayre
- 1949–1951: Fritz Morstein Marx
- 1947–1949: Rowland Egger
- 1945–1947: E. Pendleton Herring
- 1943–1945: Gordon R. Clapp
- 1940–1943: Leonard D. White

== See also ==
- List of public administration journals
