= Frank Farmer =

Frank Farmer may refer to:

- Frank Farmer (racing driver) (1900–1932), American racecar driver
- Frank Farmer (physicist) (1912–2004), British medical physicist
- Frank Farmer (writer) (1924–2014), American author and writer
- F. R. Farmer (Frank Reginald Farmer, 1914–2001), British nuclear safety regulator
- Frank Farmer, the title character of the 1992 film The Bodyguard
