= Thomas Farmer =

Thomas Farmer may refer to:

- Thomas Farmer (MP) (1546–1621), English MP for Norfolk
- Thomas Farmer (composer) (fl. 1685), English composer
- Tom Farmer (1940–2025), Scottish businessman
- Tom Farmer (American football) (1921–1980), American football halfback
- Thomas Fermore or Farmer (died 1609), MP for Chipping Wycombe
- Thomas Fermor (died 1580), MP
