= Richard J. Stillman =

American soldier and academic

Colonel Richard J. Stillman USAR (ret.)
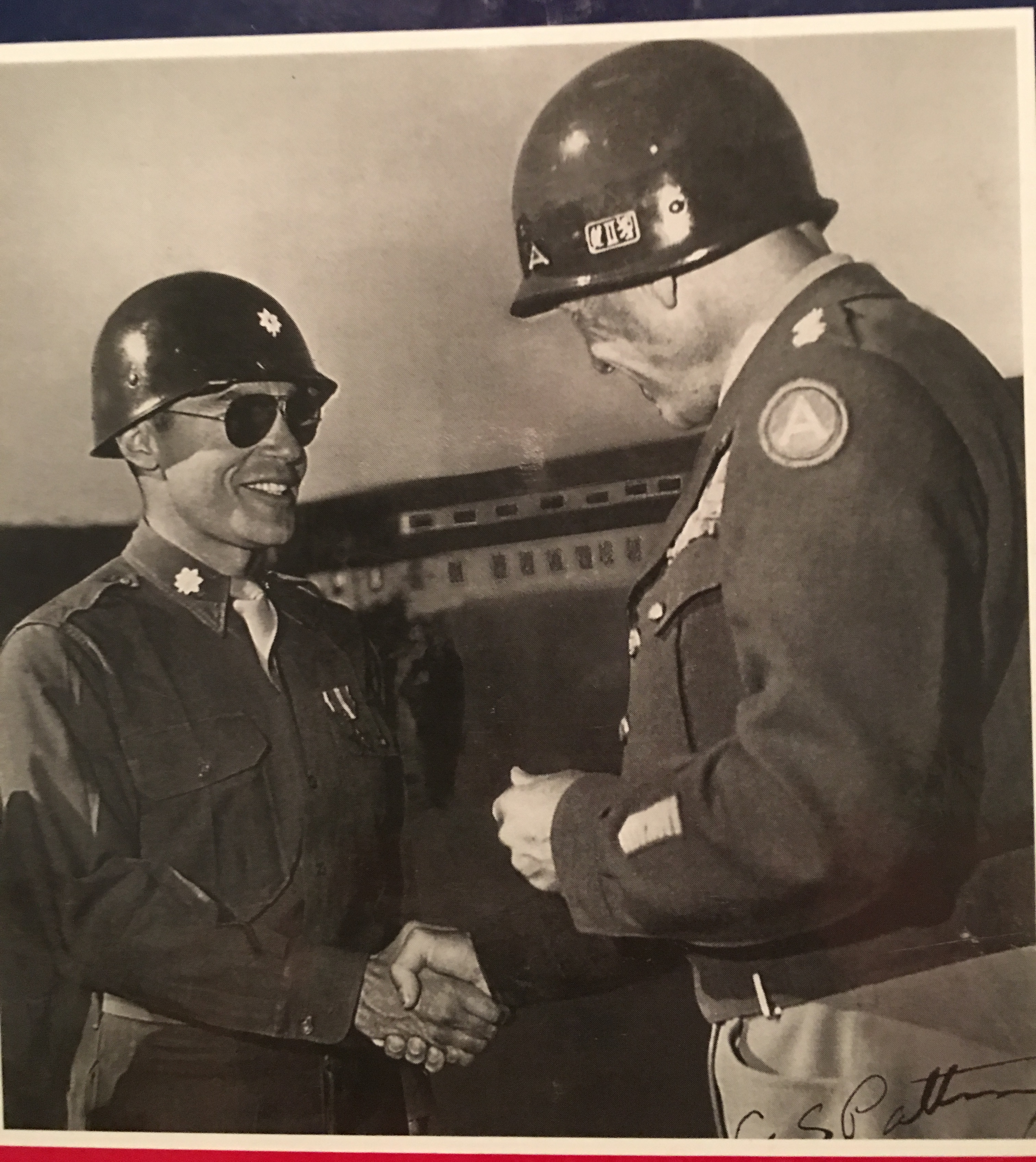
- Born: February 20, 1917; Lansing, Michigan
- Died: July 15, 2008 (aged 91); New Orleans, Louisiana
- Military career
- Allegiance: American
- Branch: United States Army
- Service years: 23 years
- Rank: Colonel
- Conflicts: World War II

Richard J. Stillman (1917–2008) was a professor emeritus of management at the University of New Orleans College of Business Administration, where he taught from 1967 until 1982. He wrote a total of eighteen books on management, investing, and personal finance. He was a World War II veteran, serving as aide to General Patton. Stillman became a military historian who wrote extensively on Patton.

== Early life ==
Richard Joseph Stillman was born on February 20, 1917, in Lansing, Michigan. In 1934, Stillman enrolled into the Citizens' Military Training Camp at Ft. Muster, Michigan. Stillman was commissioned as a 2nd Lieutenant in the Infantry Reserve Corps on August 1, 1938. He served 19 months in WWII as an aide to General George Patton.

He received his undergraduate degree the University of Southern California and Graduate degree in Public Administration from Syracuse University. He also earned an MBA from Harvard University in 1940.

== Military career ==
He served as a colonel in the U.S. Army Reserve.

Stillman was called to active duty as an infantry platoon leader in 1939. He participated in the Louisiana Maneuvers as a captain and spent over two years working various assignments as an inspector for the 2nd Cavalry Division and Third Army before being assigned to the G-3 Section as a major.

He subsequently was promoted to lieutenant colonel in 1951, and then to colonel.

He taught at West Point Military Academy (USMA) from 1952 to 1954, and at Army War College and NATO Defense College in Paris, France from 1960 to 1964.

He retired as colonel (O-6) in 1964

Stillman was awarded the Bronze Star, The Legion of Merit the Luxembourg Order of the Crown, and the Paratrooper Badge for his military service.

== Academic career ==
Stillman was a professor of management and business at Ohio University from 1965 to 1967 before moving to New Orleans and taught management and finance for fifteen years. The university founded a Richard J Stillman Lifetime Achievement Award to honor Stillman. He served as president of the R.J. Stillman Company, a publishing operation.

== Charitable Giving ==
Stillman funded an endowed professorship in management at UNO and sponsored the running track on the campus. In 1993 he founded the "Richard and Darlene Stillman Public Speaking Contest."He also donated a General Patton section at the National World War II Museum in New Orleans.

Between 1996 and 2002, he won 18 medals as part of the Senior Olympic Games.

== Personal life ==
Stillman was married to Darlene. They had two sons, Richard J. Stillman II (Kathleen) and Thomas Stillman(Deborah), and four grandchildren, Shannon, Dara, Richard III, and Slater. Their daughter Ellen preceded him in death.

== Publications ==
Some of his books include:

- General Patton's Secret Missions. R.J. Stillman Company (2005). ISBN 0965090655
- General Patton's Timeless Leadership Principles: Your Practical Guide For a Successful Career and Life. Richard J. Stillman Company; First hardcover edition (September 1, 1998). ISBN 0965090612
- Public administration: Concepts & Cases. Houghton Mifflin; 4th edition (1988). ISBN 0395359694
- The U.S. Infantry Queen of Battle . Franklin Watts; First edition (1965).
- Do It Yourself Contracting to Build Your Own Home Second Edition.
- How to Use the Personal Computer to Manage Your Personal Finances. Prentice Hall (December 1, 1987).
- Guide to Personal Finance: A Lifetime Program of Money Management. Pearson College Div; Subsequent edition (February 1, 1988). ISBN 0133702146
- Dow Jones Industrial Average: History and Role in an Investment Strategy. Irwin Professional Pub (March 1, 1986). ISBN 9780870945861

== Awards ==
- The Bronze Star (pinned by General George S. Patton Jr.)
- The Legion of Merit
- The Luxembourg Order of the Crown
