= Farmar =

Farmar is a surname. Notable people with the surname include:

- Jordan Farmar (born 1986), American basketball player
- Leo Farmar (1878–1907), British botanist
- Robert Farmar (1717–1778), British Army officer

== See also ==
- Farmer (surname)
