= Peter Farmer =

Peter Farmer may refer to:

- Peter Farmer (set designer) (1936–2017), British theater artist, set designer and book illustrator
- Peter Farmer (footballer) (1886–1964), Scottish football player and manager
- Peter Farmer (hammer thrower) (born 1952), Australian Olympic hammer thrower
- Peter Farmer (toxicologist) (born 1947), British toxicologist
