= Deil S. Wright =

Deil S. Wright (June 18, 1930 – June 30, 2009) was an American political scientist, who specialized in public administration and spent much of his career as a professor at the University of North Carolina at Chapel Hill. He was an expert on intergovernmental relations, and wrote a leading textbook on that subject.

Wright was born in Three Rivers, Michigan, in 1930, and attended the University of Michigan, where he completed a bachelor's degree in 1952, a Master of Public Administration in 1954, and a PhD in political science in 1957. His doctoral dissertation surveyed attitudes toward local government by residents of Detroit, and was called "The Prestige of the Public Service in a Metropolitan Community".

Wright taught political science at Wayne State University, the University of Iowa, and UC Berkeley, before joining the University of North Carolina faculty, where he served as a professor from 1967 to 2002, when he took emeritus status. Wright was a major contributor to UNC's MPA program, and was its director from 1973 to 1979. He received the Dwight Waldo Award from the American Society for Public Administration in 2000.

Wright's published works included Public Administration and the Public (1958), Intergovernmental Action on Environmental Policy: The Role of the States (1967), Understanding Intergovernmental Relations (1978), and Globalization and Decentralization (1996). He also published more than 100 articles, in journals such as American Political Science Review, Public Administration Review, and Publius: A Journal of Federalism.
