= George Farmer =

George Farmer may refer to:

- George Farmer (Royal Navy officer) (1732–1779), British Royal Navy officer
- George Farmer (English footballer) (1862–?), English footballer who played for Stoke City
- George Farmer (Welsh footballer) (1862–1905), Wales international footballer who played for Everton
- George Farmer (luger) (born 1938), American Olympic luger
- George Farmer (wide receiver, born 1948), American football player for the Chicago Bears and Detroit Lions, college basketball player
- George Farmer (wide receiver, born 1958), American football player for the Los Angeles Rams and Miami Dolphins
- George Farmer (aquascaper), British aquascaper
- George Farmer (businessman) (born 1990), British-American businessman
- Buck Farmer (George Farmer, born 1991), American baseball pitcher
- George Farmer (running back) (born 1993), American football player for the Seattle Seahawks

== See also ==
- Farmer George
- Georgie Farmer (born 2002), British actor
