= Francis Coker =

Francis William Coker (November 1, 1878 – May 26, 1963) was an American political scientist and the chairman of the Department of Government at Yale University from 1937 to 1945. Coker's work focused on political theory, particularly theories of the state and the nature of democracy.

== Biography ==
Coker was born in Society Hill, South Carolina. He received an A.B. from the University of North Carolina in 1899 and a second A.B. from Harvard in 1902. In 1910, he received his PhD from Columbia University under William Archibald Dunning, and began teaching at Ohio State University, where he remained until 1929.

In 1916, Coker married Helene Ruth Patton with whom he had two children, including Francis William Coker, Jr., who later became a noted lawyer. In 1929, Coker left Ohio State to become the Cowles Professor of Government at Yale. In 1937, he was appointed chairman of the government department at Yale, and held that position until his retirement in 1945. In 1947, he was named an emeritus professor at Yale, and he retired in 1949. Coker's students at Yale included Robert Dahl, Miriam Irish, and Dwight Waldo, all of whom cited him as an important influence.

In 1919, Coker testified as an expert witness in the trial of Henry Ford v. Chicago Tribune. Ford alleged that the Tribune libeled him in 1916 by calling him an anarchist and sought $1 million. A Michigan state trial jury sided with Ford but only awarded him six cents. Coker's testimony appears to have been brought to the jury by attorney Albert Lucking with the sole purpose of elevating Dunning's stature.

Coker died on May 26, 1963, at his home in Hamden, Connecticut, and was buried in his hometown of Society Hill.

== Academic work ==
Coker published his first book, Organismic Theories of the State in 1910. In the work, Coker criticized contemporary theories of the state as a unitary actor, and argued that "such theories ultimately failed." The book drew a somewhat frosty response, and L.L. Bernard wrote in the American Journal of Sociology that Coker "missed the point". Nonetheless, the book gained a following and is still cited today.

Coker's other major theoretical work was Recent Political Thought published in 1934. The book examined the development of political ideas from the mid-nineteenth century until the early 1930s. The book primarily focused on liberal democracy and both leftist and rightist challenges to it. Without firmly taking a position on democracy in the book, Coker did conclude that liberal democracy "was a more reasonable political alternative than critics on either side of the political spectrum appreciate." Recent Political Thought was generally well received and one reviewer in the American Journal of International Law called the work "a service to all teachers of political theory". Similarly, Francis Wilson, writing in the American Political Science Review called the book "the best of the works on current political thinking."

Coker also edited several works on political theory, which became "standard anthologies in political theory courses," and wrote numerous articles in journals and other publications. The central themes in all of his work were theories of the state, and the nature of liberal democracy.
