= The Administrative State =

1948 book by Dwight Waldo

- Author: Dwight Waldo
- Language: English
- Publisher: The Ronald Press Company
- Publication date: 1948
- Publication place: United States

The Administrative State is Dwight Waldo's 1948 classic public administration text based on a dissertation written at Yale University. In the book, Waldo argues that democratic states are underpinned by professional and political bureaucracies and that scientific management and efficiency is not the core idea of government bureaucracy, but rather it is service to the public. The work has contributed to the structure and theory of government bureaucracies the world over and is one of the defining works of public administration and political science written in the last 75 years.

The Administrative State was first published in 1948 and later reissued in a second edition with an extensively revised introduction by Waldo.

== History of the concept ==
The phrase “the administrative state” was widely used before Dwight Waldo adopted it in 1948, and the concept of administrative powers and responsibilities has been the subject of debate for as long as the structure of democratic government has been implemented. Where the current debate begins is with the United States Constitution, and arguments over the powers which are and aren't legitimate under that constitution.

The primary debate is over whether or not nonelected agencies of the government have the power to legislate as well as enforce. The argument for the power is that all federal agencies/ officials are subject to the President of the United States, who is elected for the purpose of accommodating the new power democratically, so that it does not need to be voted on directly by the public; where the counter is that “agencies remain inefficient, ineffective, and undemocratic;” attempting to justify that the public’s inability to vote for the policy that the agency adopts is undemocratic/unconstitutional (Harvard Law Review).

Harvard Law Review notes “The presidential control model of the administrative state, perhaps most definitively expounded by now-Supreme Court Justice Elena Kagan, suggests that top-down accountability affords agencies a measure of democratic accountability and assures effective administration," i.e. that agency-implemented policy/law is subject to democracy by way of citizens' ability to hold the elected official at the head of the relevant chain of government responsible. They question whether top-down responsibility and accountability are efficient enough to prevent government agencies' natural hunger for power from overriding their mandate to act in the best interests of the people.

== Response to politics-administration dichotomy ==
The book posits that an "administrative state" contains a tension between democracy and bureaucracy that obliges career public servants to protect democratic principles. Waldo's position is that strict adherence of the Politics-administration dichotomy is false, and that public servants hold political positions that require more than the mere implementation of policy set by elected officials. Rather, they must negotiate between efficient, scientific management and the demands for due process and public access to government. Government cannot be run like a business where efficiency and profits are highest priority. Honoring the Constitution and other democratic imperatives makes managing a unit of the government far more challenging than a comparable private-sector organization.

Waldo introduces the concept of The Great Society which he argues is based upon the private sector. He also points out that in the U.S., business supports the state, while it should be the other way around. In addition, he states that with the evolution of social trends in the U.S., fundamental laws were eroded by modern ideas thus changing the entire concept of government and public administration.

== Significance of The Administrative State ==
Waldo's book had a long lasting effect on politics, administration, and serving the public. It added new dimensions to the study of public administration, including the traditions of democracy, the moral and natural laws guiding public thinking, progressivism, faith in science, and the "gospel of efficiency." Waldo's arguments often deal with what government should do. While public administration is often considered as a science, Waldo declared it to be a political theory. Some theories of public administration are defined by tension and others by debate of two different kinds—science and politics. Waldo proposes some essential questions about public administration with themes in political philosophy going back to ancient Greece: the nature of the good life, the bases of decision, who should rule, the separation of powers, and centralization of government versus decentralization of government, that still have relevance in the world today. The book's premise that administrators in the public arena must play a policy-making role in government has had a far-reaching impact in the field of public administration.

== See also ==
- Link to the full text on Internet Archive
