= John Farmer (cartographer) =

American cartographer (1798–1859)

- Born: February 9, 1798; Halfmoon, New York
- Died: March 24, 1859 (aged 61); Detroit
- Occupation: Cartographer

Map of the state of Michigan and the surrounding country

John Farmer (1798 – 1859, Detroit) was an American educator and cartographer.

Farmer was born February 9, 1798, in Halfmoon, New York. In 1821 he taught map drawing in schools in Albany, New York. Later that year he was recruited to Michigan by the Regents of the University of Michigan to serve as principal of a Lancastrian school in Detroit. In 1824 he was employed by surveyor and land speculator Orange Risdon to work with him on a detailed map of Michigan to be completed that year. Anticipating a flood of immigrants from the east when the Erie Canal was scheduled to open the following year, Farmer decided to go into the map trade himself, producing his own map of Michigan in 1825.

Farmer found the delay and cost of sending his manuscripts east to be engraved in copper for printing time-consuming and expensive. So he taught himself the skill of engraving copper plates, and beginning in 1835 engraved his own plates. Over the following 24 years Farmer produced dozens of maps of Michigan, Wisconsin, and several cities. He also continuously revised and released new editions of his Michigan maps. The anticipated flood of settlers did arrive, and updated detailed maps showing the public land survey were popular with new arrivals as they contained extraordinary detail of every surveyed township and section.

One of his most notable works was Map of the State of Michigan and the Surrounding Country, first issued in 1844 and revised eleven times before his death. His wife, Roxanne Farmer, and son Silas Farmer later issued additional revisions until 1874. All editions after the 3rd were labeled as the "23rd edition," though the year often varied in the cartouche, which caused some confusion among map collectors and historians.

In 1826 Farmer married Roxanne Hamilton, also of Halfmoon, NY, and had three children, Silas, John, and Esther. Upon Farmer's death on March 24, 1859, Roxanne took over the business as produced several maps, then was succeeded by their oldest son Silas.
