= Charles Goodsell =

American academic (1932–2024)

Charles T. Goodsell
- Born: Charles T. Goodsell; July 23, 1932; Kalamazoo, Michigan, U.S.
- Died: November 24, 2024 (aged 92); Blacksburg, Virginia, U.S.
- Education: BA at Kalamazoo College, PhD. at Harvard University
- Occupations: Professor, Political Scientist, author
- Notable work: The Case for Bureaucracy
- Spouse: Mary Elizabeth Goodsell
- Awards: Virginia Tech College of Architecture and Urban Studies Distinguished Scholarship Award; NASPAA/ASPA Distinguished Research Award; Dwight Waldo Award

Charles True Goodsell (July 23, 1932 – November 24, 2024) was an American academic and writer who was Professor Emeritus at Virginia Tech's Center for Public Administration and Policy. He was perhaps best known for his volume The Case for Bureaucracy, now in its 4th edition.

Goodsell was a co-author of the Blacksburg Manifesto, written with Gary Wamsley, Robert Bacher, Philip Kronenberg, John Rohr, Camilla Stivers, Orion White, and James Wolf – all of whom were at Virginia Tech during the 1980s. In 1994, Goodsell was elected as a fellow of the National Academy of Public Administration.

== Early life and education ==
Charles T. Goodsell was born in Kalamazoo, Michigan on July 23, 1932. He is the son of former Kalamazoo College President Charles Goodsell and Frances Comee Goodsell. Goodsell earned his BA degree at Kalamazoo College in 1954. Goodsell graduated magna cum laude and was awarded the William G. Howard Memorial Prize in political science and the Oakley Prize for highest grade recorded for a college course. After graduating, Goodsell enlisted in the United States Army and served from 1954 to 1956. Goodsell then obtained his PhD at Harvard University where he was a student of V. O. Key, Jr.

== Academic career ==
Goodsell began his academic teaching career as an assistant professor of public administration at the University of Puerto Rico in 1961. In 1964 he became a research associate at Princeton University. Two years later in 1966, he became a professor of political science at Southern Illinois University. In 1978, Charles Goodsell began teaching at Virginia Tech University as a professor of public administration and public affairs and served as director of the university's Center for Public Administration and Policy. Goodsell continued to teach at Virginia Tech University until he retired in 2002, although he remained at the university as professor emeritus. During his career, Goodsell was also a distinguished visitor at Cleveland State University, Carleton University and the University of Texas at Austin.

== Author ==
In The Case for Bureaucracy: A Public Administration Polemic, Charles Goodsell takes the position that the generally disparaging view of bureaucracy is unwarranted, and that the "quality of public service in the United states is vastly underrated". Originally published in 1983, it is Goodsell's best known work. Intended to be a rebuttal to the popular notion of bureaucracy as a callous, oppressive, and dysfunctional machine, it has been the recipient of much praise within the field of public administration. Since its original release, there have been 3 subsequent editions, with the 4th edition being released in December 2003.

In Goodsell's 2011 book, Mission Mystique: Belief Systems in Public Agencies, he examines six United States public agencies, including the US National Park Service, the US National Weather Service, the Centers for Disease Control and Prevention, and the Peace Corps, among others.

In The American statehouse: Interpreting democracy's temples, Goodsell reviews all fifty United States’ capitals and their buildings. He uses three concepts to interpret government architecture in the social sense: the search for political values in the buildings, the effects of the building on behavior, and the impression the buildings make on society. Additionally, all of the photographs used in the book were taken by Goodsell.

== Death ==
Goodsell died in Blacksburg on November 24, 2024, at the age of 92.

== Additional publications ==
- Goodsell, Charles T (1965). Administration of a revolution; executive reform in Puerto Rico under Governor Tugwell, 1941–1946. Cambridge, MA: Harvard University Press. OCLC 487459.
- Goodsell, Charles T (1974). American corporations and Peruvian politics. Cambridge, MA: Harvard University Press. ISBN 978-0-674-02280-5.
- Goodsell, Charles T (1977). "Bureaucratic manipulation of physical symbols: an empirical study". American Journal of Political Science. 21 (1): 79–91. doi:10.2307/2110449. JSTOR 2110449.
- Goodsell, Charles T (1981). The public encounter: where state and citizen meet. Bloomington: Indiana University Press. ISBN 978-0-253-15363-0.
- Goodsell, Charles T (1983). The case for bureaucracy: a public administration polemic. Chatham, NJ: Chatham House Publishers. ISBN 978-0-934540-17-9.
- Goodsell, Charles T (1985). The case for bureaucracy: a public administration polemic (2nd ed.). Chatham, NJ: Chatham House Publishers. ISBN 978-0-934540-55-1.
- Goodsell, Charles T (1988). The social meaning of civic space: studying political authority through architecture. Lawrence, KS: University Press of Kansas. ISBN 978-0-7006-0347-3.
- Goodsell, Charles T (1989). "Administration as ritual". Public Administration Review. 49 (2): 161–166. doi:10.2307/977336. JSTOR 977336.
- Goodsell, Charles T (1992). "The public administrator as artisan". Public Administration Review. 52 (3): 246–253. doi:10.2307/976922. JSTOR 976922.
- Goodsell, Charles T (1993). "Reinvent government or rediscover it?". Public Administration Review. 53 (1): 85–87. doi:10.2307/977283. JSTOR 977283.
- Goodsell, Charles T (1993). "Architecture as a setting for governance: Introduction". Journal of Architectural & Planning Research. 10 (4): 271–272. JSTOR 43029093.
- Goodsell, Charles T (1994). The case for bureaucracy: a public administration polemic (3rd ed.). Chatham, NJ: Chatham House Publishers. ISBN 978-1-56643-007-4.
- Goodsell, Charles T; Nancy Murray (1995). Public administration illuminated and inspired by the arts. Westport, Conn: Praeger. ISBN 978-0-275-94806-1.
- Goodsell, Charles T (2006). "A new vision for public administration". American Journal of Political Science. 66 (4): 623–635. doi:10.1111/j.1540-6210.2006.00622.x.
- Goodsell, Charles T (2007). "Six normative principles for the contracting-out debate". Administration & Society. 38 (6): 669–688. CiteSeerX 10.1.1.611.2792. doi:10.1177/0095399706293147.
- Goodsell, Charles T (2025). Governance for Good: The Power of Public Service (1st ed.). ISBN 979-8336827729.
