= James Farmer (disambiguation) =

James Farmer (1920–1999) was one of the leaders of the U.S. Civil Rights Movement in the 1950s and 1960s.

James Farmer may also refer to:

- James Farmer (politician) (1823–1895), representing Marsden (and other electorates) in the New Zealand Parliament
- James Farmer (industrialist) (1823–1892), British industrialist and mayor of the County Borough of Salford
- James Farmer (lawyer) (born 1941), New Zealand barrister and jurist; Queen's Counsel
- James L. Farmer Sr. (1886–1961), first African-American Texan to earn a doctorate
- Jim Farmer (born 1964), American basketball player
- Jim Farmer (runner) (born 1965), American distance runner
- James N. Farmer (born 1976), online education and WordPress pioneer, founder of Edublogs
- J. Doyne Farmer (born 1952), American physicist and entrepreneur
- Ted Farmer (James Edward Colm Farmer, born 1940), English footballer
