= Ralph P. Hummel =

Ralph P. Hummel (August 9, 1937 – March 20, 2012) was a professor of public administration at the University of Akron and a founding fellow of the Institute of Applied Phenomenology in Science and Technology. He is best known for his book The Bureaucratic Experience.

== Education and career ==
Hummel graduated from Wayne State University, where he worked for The Daily Collegian. He worked as a reporter and editor for The New York Times and The Washington Post, among other papers. He received his Ph.D. in political science from New York University in 1972. His Ph.D. thesis examined the concept of charisma in the works of Max Weber.

He taught at Fordham University, State University of New York at Fredonia, John Jay College of Criminal Justice, New York University, Brooklyn College, and the University of Oklahoma. After 10 years as a professor at the University of Akron in the Department of Public Administration and Urban Studies, he retired in 2008 and became professor emeritus.

== The Bureaucratic Experience ==
Hummel's most famous work was the book The Bureaucratic Experience which went through five editions (1977, 1982, 1987, 1994, and 2008). The book contends that bureaucracy is dehumanizing; for example, it deals with cases instead of people, and it focuses on efficiency at the expense of other human values. Hummel also wrote The Real American Politics: Changing Perspectives on American Government (Jan 1986) and Politics for Human Beings with Robert A. Isaak (1975)

== Personal life ==
Hummel was born in Karlsruhe, Germany, on August 9, 1937, emigrated to Canada and eventually to the United States in 1951. He was married to Camilla Stivers, a professor of public administration. He died in Rockport, Maine on March 20, 2012.

== Selected publications ==
- Isaak, Robert A.; Hummel, Ralph P. (1975). Politics for Human Beings. North Scituate, MA: Duxbury Press. ISBN 978-0878720729.
- Hummel, Ralph P. (1977). The Bureaucratic Experience. New York: St. Martin's Press. ISBN 978-0312108151.
- Hummel, Ralph P.; Isaak, Robert A. (1980). Politics for Human Beings (2nd ed.). Monterey, CA: Duxbury Press. ISBN 978-0878722297.
- Hummel, Ralph P. (1982). The Bureaucratic Experience (2nd ed.). New York: St. Martin's Press. ISBN 978-0312108519.
- Hummel, Ralph P.; Isaak, Robert A. (1986). The Real American Politics: Changing Perspectives on American Government. Englewood Cliffs, NJ: Prentice-Hall. ISBN 978-0137623525.
- Hummel, Ralph P. (1987). The Bureaucratic Experience (3rd ed.). New York: St. Martin's Press. ISBN 978-0312108533.
- Hummel, Ralph P. (1990). "Uncovering Validity Criteria for Stories Managers Hear and Tell". American Review of Public Administration. 20 (4): 303–314. doi:10.1177/027507409002000404. hdl:11244/25081. S2CID 143947001.
- Hummel, Ralph P. (1991). "Stories Managers Tell: Why They Are as Valid as Science". Public Administration Review. 51 (1): 31–41. doi:10.2307/976634. JSTOR 976634.
- Hummel, Ralph P. (1994). The Bureaucratic Experience: a Critique of Life in the Modern Organization (4th ed.). New York: St. Martin's Press. ISBN 978-0312095543.
- Gale, Scott A.; Hummel, Ralph P. (2003). "A Debt Unpaid — Reinterpreting Max Weber on Bureaucracy". Administrative Theory & Praxis. 25 (3): 409–418. doi:10.1080/10841806.2003.11029411. S2CID 156065737.
- Hummel, Ralph P. (2006). "The Triumph of Numbers: Knowledges and the Mismeasure of Management". Administration & Society. 38 (1): 58–78. doi:10.1177/0095399705284202. S2CID 143278380.
- Hummel, Ralph P. (2008). "Toward Bindlestiff Science: Let's All Get Off the 3:10 to Yuma". Administration & Society. 39 (8): 1013–1019. doi:10.1177/0095399707309815. S2CID 144691164.
- Hummel, Ralph P. (2008). The Bureaucratic Experience: the Post-Modern Challenge (5th ed.). Armonk, NY: M.E. Sharpe. ISBN 9780765610102.
