= State/Space theory =

Socio-political geographical theory

State/Space theory constitutes a new branch of social and political geography in which the issues of space as a geographic element are considered for their influence on political relationships and outcomes. Leading scholars include Neil Brenner at the Harvard Graduate School of Design, and Bob Jessop at Lancaster University in England, United Kingdom.

Other relevant scholars include the following: Henri Lefebvre, Charles Tilly, Saskia Sassen, and Edward W. Soja.

== Publications ==
- Neil Brenner, New State Spaces, Urban Governance, and the Rescaling of Statehood, Oxford: Oxford University Press, 2004, ISBN 0-19-927006-6.
