= Felix A. Nigro =

U.S. scholar in public administration

Felix Anthony Nigro (1914–2007) was a pioneering scholar in public administration. He was included in the International Who's Who and was elected to the National Academy of Public Administration.

== University studies ==
Felix Nigro did his undergraduate studies at the University of Wisconsin at Madison (1935), where he graduated Phi Beta Kappa, and earned his Ph.D. in political science from the same university in 1948.

== Career ==
Nigro had a distinguished career working with the Federal National Youth Administration and other federal agencies. He worked extensively in Latin America, for private industry, the State Department and the United Nations, in Venezuela, Uruguay, El Salvador and Costa Rica. He twice held teaching positions at the University of Puerto Rico (1949-1951 and 1955–1956) After returning permanently to the United States in 1957, Professor Nigro taught at Southern Illinois University, San Diego State University and the University of Delaware, where he held the Charles P. Messick distinguished professorship. He joined the Political Science faculty at the University of Georgia in 1969.

=== Authorship ===
Nigro was the author of many articles and several of the most important textbooks in the field, Modern Public Administration (1965; through 7th Edition in 1989), Public Personnel Administration (1959), and The New Public Personnel Administration (1976; through 6th Edition in 2007). Starting with the second edition of the public administration textbook and the first edition of the ‘New’ personnel textbook, his co-author was his son, Lloyd G. Nigro – a distinguished public administration scholar in his own right.

=== Retirement ===
Nigro retired in 1982 as professor emeritus. The following three years he was visiting professor at Ryder College in Lawrenceville, New Jersey; from 1985 to 1992 he was a labor relations arbitrator building on his long-standing work in that field.

== Personal life ==
Felix Anthony Nigro was born August 8, 1914, in Brooklyn, New York. He married Edna H. Nelson, and they had a daughter, Kirsten, and son, Lloyd. Felix was an ardent fan of the New York and later San Francisco Giants.

He died, emeritus professor of political science at the University of Georgia, in Athens, Georgia, on September 5, 2007. He was 93 years old.
