= Joseph John Farmer =

Recipient of the Victoria Cross

Joseph John Farmer VC
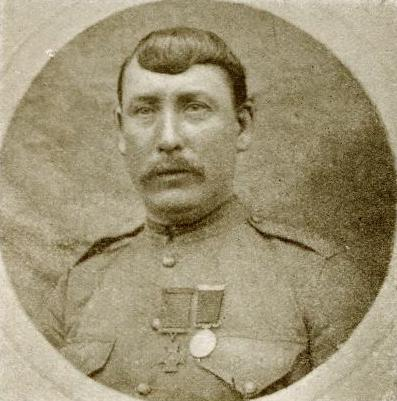
- Born: 15 May 1854; Clerkenwell, London
- Died: 30 June 1930 (aged 76); Mount Vernon Hospital, Northwood, Middlesex
- Burial place: Brompton Cemetery
- Military career
- Allegiance: United Kingdom
- Branch: British Army
- Service years: 1879–1881
- Rank: Corporal
- Units: Army Hospital Corps
- Conflicts: Anglo-Zulu War; First Boer War
- Awards: Victoria Cross

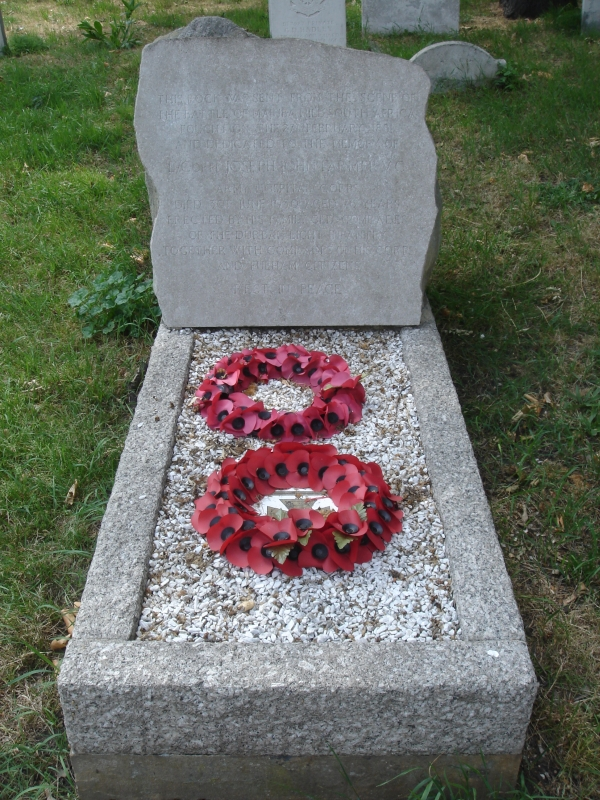
Funerary monument, Brompton Cemetery, London

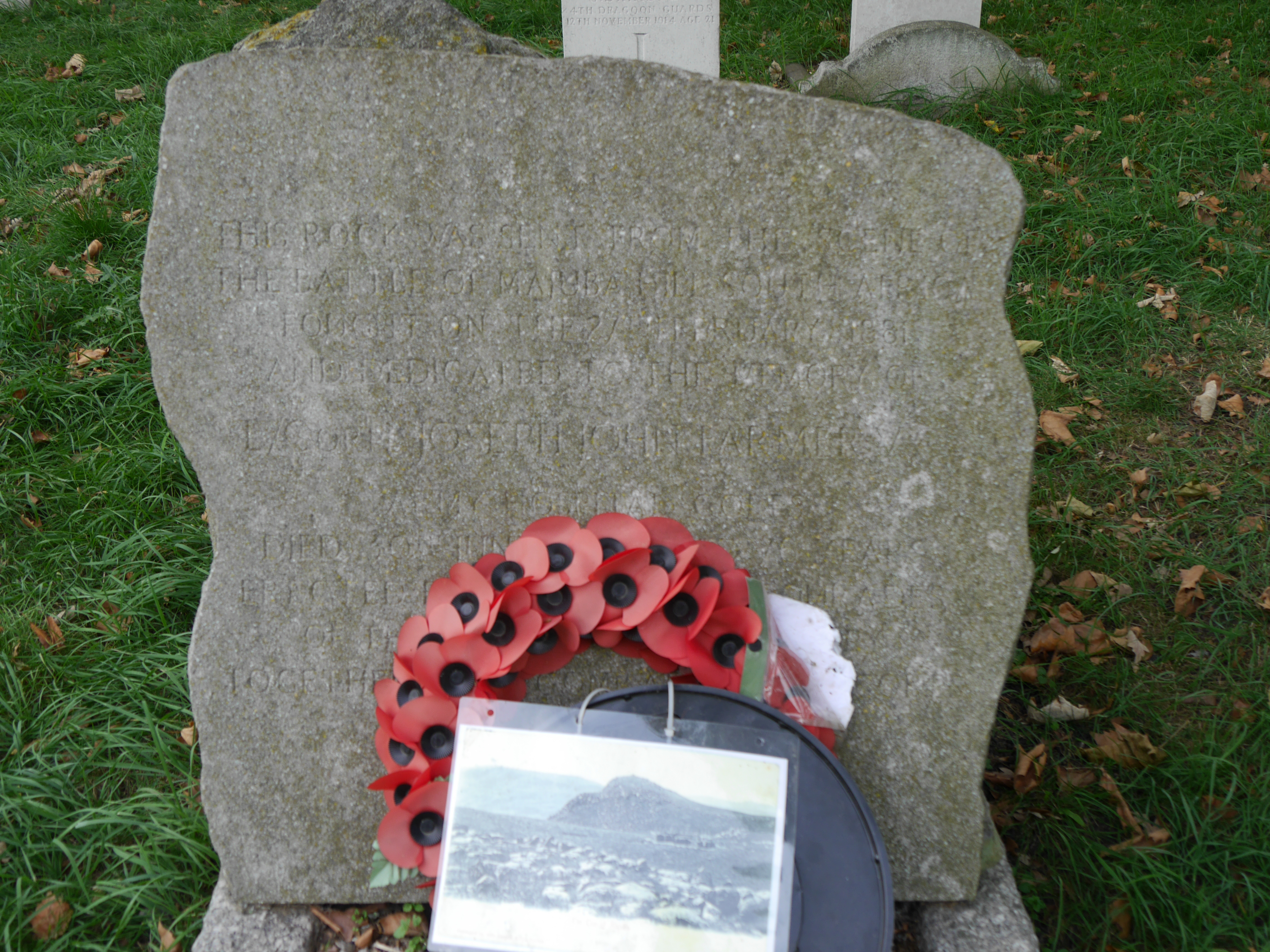
Detail

Joseph John Farmer VC (15 May 1854 – 30 June 1930) was an English recipient of the Victoria Cross, the highest and most prestigious award for gallantry in the face of the enemy that can be awarded to British and Commonwealth forces.

== Early life ==
He attended school in King's Cross, and thereafter was apprenticed to the building trade. However, at the age of 13 years he went to sea with the Mercantile Marine serving aboard English and American ships. In 1875, he was shipwrecked off the Isle of Wight, and again a year later in a hurricane off Hong Kong. He left the sea in 1878, and on returning home he fell ill with smallpox.

Whilst still under medical care he saved the life of a delirious patient who tried to jump out of a window. When he had recovered from his illness, he took an appointment as a night porter to look after demented patients. Another similar appointment followed, and after having his interest in medical matters further awakened he joined the Army Hospital Corps on 27 February 1879. Following a course in anatomy and ambulance work he left for the Cape of Good Hope.

== Career ==
When the South African War broke out he served in a Field Hospital. He then served in the relief column sent to the beleaguered garrisons of Potchefstroom and Lydenburg, and saw action at Laing's Nek and again at Majuba Hill. Farmer was first utilised treating the wounded from the Battle of Ulundi during the Anglo-Zulu War. He was 26 years old, and a provisional lance-corporal in the Army Hospital Corps (later Royal Army Medical Corps), British Army during the First Boer War when the following deed took place on 27 February 1881, at Majuba Hill in South Africa for which he was awarded the VC:

For conspicuous bravery during the engagement with the Boers at the Majuba Mountain, on the 27th February, 1881, when he showed a spirit of self-abnegation and an example of cool courage which cannot be too highly commended. While the Boers closed with the British troops near the wells, Corporal Farmer held a white flag over the wounded, and when the arm holding the flag was shot through, he called out that he had "another." He then raised the flag with the other arm, and continued to do so until that also was pierced with a bullet.

He later achieved the rank of corporal. He was forced to leave the army due to his wounds and joined the Corps of Commissionaires and then became a house-painter.

== Medal ==
His Victoria Cross is displayed at the Army Medical Services Museum in Aldershot, England.
