= Richard J. Stillman II =

Richard J. Stillman II is a professor of public administration at the University of Colorado at Denver.

Stillman was born on June 17, 1943, in San Antonio, Texas, to Richard J. Stillman I. After completing a bachelor of arts degree at Harvard University in 1966, Stillman received his Ph.D. from the Maxwell School, Syracuse University. He taught at California State University, Bakersfield and George Mason University before joining the faculty of the University of Colorado at Denver in 1992.

Stillman edited Public Administration Review, a premier journal focused on public affairs between 2006 and 2011.

== Publications ==
The American Bureaucracy, 3rd ed., Wadsworth Publishing, ISBN 0-534-61420-5, 2003.

Basic Documents of American Public Administration since 1950.

2004, Preliminary thoughts on reading American governance symbolically: Or modern U.S. statecraft as reform-craft, Public Integrity

2003, Twenty-First Century United States Governance: Statecraft as Reform Craft ad the Peculiar Governing Paradox it Perpetuates. Public Administration

1998, Creating the American state: the moral reformers and the modern administrative world they made

1997, American vs. European public administration: does public administration make the modern state, or does the state make public administration?, Public Administration Review

1996, The American bureaucracy: the core of modern government

1996, Public administration, concepts and cases

1991, Preface to Public Administration: A Search for Themes and Direction

1990, The Peculiar "Stateless" Origins of American Public Administration and the Consequences for Government Today, Public Administration Review

1987, The Constitutional Bicentennial, and the Centennial of the American Administrative State, Public Administration Review
