= Philip James Rutledge =

American diplomat (1925–2007)

Philip James Rutledge (October 15, 1925 – January 26, 2007) was a senior administrator during the presidency of Lyndon B. Johnson, and past President of the American Society for Public Administration, Rutledge was a professor of public and environmental affairs and political science at Indiana University Northwest, and he also was chair of the Department of Public Administration at Howard University.

== Biography ==
Rutledge was born October 15, 1925, in Dawson, Georgia.

He received s bachelor's degree in political science and sociology from Roosevelt University in Chicago, and a master's of Public Health from the University of Michigan School of Public Health. In 1980, he received an Honorary Doctor of Laws from Indiana University Bloomington.

He died on January 26, 2007.
