= Daniel Gawthrop =

Daniel Gawthrop may refer to:

- Daniel E. Gawthrop, American composer
- Daniel Gawthrop (writer), Canadian journalist
