= George Farmer (luger) =

American luger (born 1938)

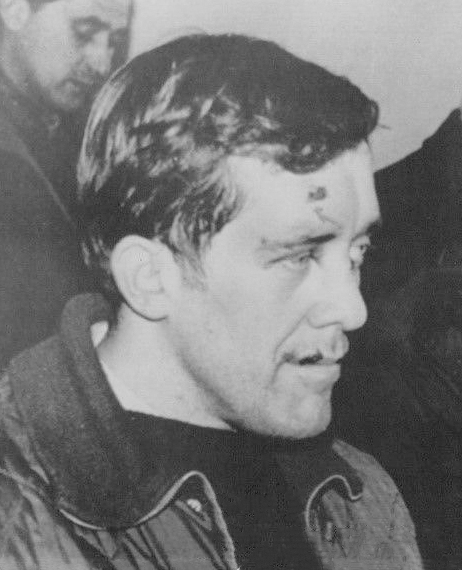
- Farmer being questioned by the Austrian police in 1964

Personal information
- Born: October 4, 1938 (age 87) Tacoma, Washington, U. S.
- Height: 185 cm (6 ft 1 in)
- Weight: 84 kg (185 lb)

Sport
- Sport: Luge
- Club: Washington Huskies, Seattle

George Robert Farmer (born October 4, 1938) is a retired American luger. He competed in singles at the 1964 Winter Olympics and placed 29th. Farmer graduated from West Seattle High School and the University of Washington. At the 1964 Olympics, Farmer, Bill Marolt and Mike Hessel, were arrested for allegedly stealing a car and fighting with police, but were later acquitted.
