= Michael Farmer =

Michael or Mike Farmer may refer to:

- Michael Farmer, Baron Farmer (born 1944), British businessman and life peer in the House of Lords
- Michael Farmer (academic), American academic and author.
- Mike Farmer (basketball), American basketball player and coach
- Mike Farmer (baseball), American Major League Baseball pitcher
