= Thomas Farmer (composer) =

English composer

Thomas Farmer (fl. 1685) was an English composer.

== Life ==
Farmer was originally one of a company of musicians in London and played in the waits. He took the degree of Mus. B. at Cambridge in 1684. The date of his death is fixed only by the fact that Henry Purcell wrote an elegy on him to words by Nahum Tate, published in Orpheus Britannicus, ii. 35, and beginning "Young Thyrsis' fate ye hills and groves deplore". This establishes the fact that Farmer died before November 1695, and probably he died young. John Hawkins stated that his house was in Martlet Court, Bow Street, Covent Garden.

== Works ==
He contributed songs to John Playford's Choice Ayres, Songs, and Dialogues (second edition, 1675). One of these is described as "in the Citizen turn'd Gentleman"; this was the sub-title of Edward Ravenscroft's Mamamouchi, produced 1675.

Apollo's Banquet contains "Mr. Farmer's Magot", for violin. His instrumental compositions are entirely for strings, in three or four parts. He wrote the tunes in The Princess of Cleve, which appear in a set of manuscript parts dated December [16]82, owned by Thomas Fuller; Fuller possessed three other compositions in three parts by him, and various overtures are contained in British Library Add MS 24889.

He contributed songs to The Theater of Musick, 1685 to 1687, and to Thomas d'Urfey's third collection, 1685. In 1686 his own collection of airs in four parts appeared, under the title of A Consort of Musick, containing 33 lessons. A Second Consort, containing 11 lessons, appeared in 1690.
