= Peter Farmer (toxicologist) =

Peter Brownlee Farmer FRSC, CChem
- Born: 30 March 1947 (age 78)
- Occupation: Toxicologist
- Employers: Medical Research Council; University of Leicester

Peter Farmer FRSC, CChem is a British toxicologist.

Farmer attended the Royal Grammar School, High Wycombe from 1957 to 1963 and won an Open Scholarship in Natural Sciences to Lincoln College, Oxford where he took a first in chemistry.

Farmer spent most of his early career as a researcher with the Toxicology Unit at the Medical Research Council.

In 2002 he was appointed joint Director of the MRC's Cancer Biomarkers and Prevention ESS (external scientific staff ) Group at the University of Leicester. He was also an Honorary Professor in Biochemistry and Cancer Studies at Leicester, becoming emeritus on retirement.

He served as chair of the Government Advisory Committee on Mutagenicity of Chemicals in Food, Consumer Products and the Environment, beginning in 2001.
