= F. R. Farmer =

Frank Reginald Farmer OBE, FRS, (18 December 1914 – 10 June 2001) was a British nuclear regulator (working for the United Kingdom Atomic Energy Authority's Safety and Reliability Directorate, SRD) and later an academic at Imperial College London.

== Accomplishments ==
- He considered the public acceptability of risk, (e.g. from nuclear reactors), arguing that a whole spectrum of events needs to be considered - not just the Maximum Credible Accident, but also those of less consequence but which were much more probable.
- He used examples such as hill walking to define a spectrum of risks which people found acceptable.
- He embodied this in a variation of (Acceptable Risk Frequency/Event Probability) with (Consequence), which is usually called the Farmer Curve.
- Farmer postulated a near-inverse variation as acceptable - thus events which have twice the consequence must be approximately half as frequent, or less. The Farmer Curve is usually plotted as a straight line in log-log co-ordinates.

He was made an OBE in 1967 and elected a Fellow of the Royal Society in 1981.
