= Larry Farmer (law professor) =

American legal academic (born 1942)

Larry Farmer (born 20 February 1942) is a professor of law at the J. Reuben Clark Law School at Brigham Young University in Provo, Utah. He is also noted for pioneering the method of document assembly.

== Career ==
Farmer has a bachelor's degree from the University of Washington. He received his Ph.D. in clinical psychology from Brigham Young University in 1975. He is an expert in legal counseling. He has been a member of the Clark Law School faculty since 1974 and has also been a visiting professor at Harvard Law School.

== Sources ==
- Larry Farmer at the MLCA Database
- list of J. Reuben Clark Law School faculty
