= Gary Wamsley =

American sociologist, academic, and public administration scholar

Gary L. Wamsley is public administration specialist and professor emeritus at Virginia Tech's Center for Public Administration and Policy. He is perhaps best known as the coordinating editor of Refounding Public Administration, a work that followed from a well-known public administration paper called the Blacksburg Manifesto. He has also for many years edited the journal Administration & Society.

He received his bachelor's degree and master's degree from the University of California, Los Angeles, and a Ph.D. from the University of Pittsburgh.

Wamsley was a student of Charles Perrow and a co-author with Mayer Zald. As with many scholars of his generation in the field of public administration, he is deeply influenced by Dwight Waldo.

As a budget theorist, Wamsley's work built on a framework started by Aaron Wildavsky. In recent years, Wamsley has discussed budgeting in terms of the sociology of Erving Goffman and used other innovative approaches to underscore the political and theatrical nature of budget formation in government.

== Books ==
The political economy of public organizations: A critique and approach to the study of public administration | Jan 1, 1976
