= David H. Rosenbloom =

David H. Rosenbloom (born 1943) is a scholar in the field of public administration. He is the Distinguished Professor of Public Administration Emeritus at the School of Public Affairs at American University in Washington, D.C. An authority on issues related to administrative law and constitutional aspects of public sector personnel and other practices and policies, Rosenbloom is known for his approach emphasizing understanding American public administration from the three perspectives associated with the constitutional separation of powers: law, politics/policy and management. He advocates establishing "constitutional competence" as a basic standard for public service professionals.

== Education ==
Rosenbloom earned a BA in political science at Marietta College in 1964. He holds a Master of Arts (1966) and PhD (1969) in political science, both at the University of Chicago. His PhD dissertation, "The Relationship Between the Citizen and the State In Public Employment in America," was the basis for his first book, Federal Service and the Constitution: The Development of the Public Employment Relationship (1971). He received an honorary doctorate of law in 1994 from Marietta College.

== Career ==
Rosenbloom was an assistant professor in political science at the University of Kansas from 1969 to 1971. From 1971 to 1973, he visited Tel Aviv University, where he was a senior lecturer in political science. From 1973 to 1978, he was an assistant and associate professor of political science at the University of Vermont. From 1978 to 1990, he was a faculty member at The Maxwell School of Citizenship and Public Affairs at Syracuse University. He was professor of public administration from 1979 to 1988, and professor of political science from 1987 to 1990. He was also an adjunct professor of law from 1985 to 1989. At the Maxwell School he was distinguished professor of public administration from 1988 to 1990. While at American University Rosenbloom was on leave to be chair professor of public management in the Department of Public and Social Administration at the City University of Hong Kong (2009-2010) and Thousand Talents Professor of Public Administration and Policy at Renmin University of China (Beijing, 2016-2019). In 2011-2025, he was editor-in-chief of the Taylor & Francis and Routledge book Series in Public Administration and Public Policy.

=== Research ===
Rosenbloom contends that contemporary public administration is based primarily on three approaches: management, politics/policy, and law.

- Managerial- The Managerial foundation is used to manage the performance of organizations. Key areas include administrative decision-making, managerial techniques, leadership, and employee contributions. By these elements working together, organizations can operate successfully.
- Political/Policy- The Political approach discusses how political officials oversee the different administrative decisions. Politicians have the final say on the laws that public administrators are tasked with executing. Within Rosenbloom's editorial "Have an Administrative Rx? Don't Forget the Politics!" he writes about the Politics/Administration Dichotomy – a principle developed by the Civil Service Reformers of the 1870s and the 1880s stating that politics and administration should remain separate in the public sector. That is a strange idea according to this article, in which he argues that if politics and public administration were separate, this approach would not work, emphasizing their inevitable interconnection.
- Legal- The most crucial, according to Rosenbloom. The rule of law involves orderliness and comprehension, and spells out when and how tasks will be completed. Rosenbloom argues that to carry out their tasks, public administrators must be competent in their legal and constitutional obligations and restrictions.

Rosenbloom's argument is that to understand public administration, it is not sufficient to use just one approach, but to think of all three at the same time. Rosenbloom documents that in 1946, by making major reforms, Congress became the central authority in how public administration operated in the federal government, incorporating all three approaches. Rosenbloom argues that public administration at other levels should operate in the same way.

=== Organizations ===
- Stream Leader, Public Policy and Management, Department of Public and Social Administration, City University of Hong Kong, 2009–2010.
- Acting chair of the Department of Public Administration and Policy at American University from 2005 to 2006.
- Chair of the American University Faculty Senate from 2004 to 2005.
- Member of the board of trustees at Marietta College from 2003 to 2009, life associate trustee in 2009.
- Member of the academic advisory board of Partnership for Public Service since 2003.
- Member of the Jack Kent Cooke Foundation Graduate Scholarship Program Review Panel from 2003 to 2008.
- Appointed member of the Clinton-Gore Transition U.S. Presidential Transition, from 1992 to 1993.
- Elected to the National Academy of Public Administration in 1986.
- American Society for Public Admministration Fellow, U.S. Civil Service Commission, Office of Federal EEO, 1970-1971.

== Publications ==
Rosenbloom has written extensively on the role of management practices, politics and political oversight, and administrative and constitutional law in public administration.

=== Sole-authored and coauthored books ===
- Administrative Law for Public Managers, Third Edition. NY: Routledge, 2023, 247 pp.

Second Edition. Boulder, CO: Westview, 2015, 221 pp. First Edition, Boulder, CO: Westview, 2003. 201 pp.

- Public Administration: Understanding Management, Politics, and Law in the Public Sector, Ninth Edition (NY: McGraw Hill, 2022 580 pp. Coauthors: Robert Kravchuk and Richard Clerkin.

Eighth Edition, NY: McGraw-Hill, 2015, 606 pp. Coauthors: Robert Kravchuk and Richard Clerkin. Seventh Edition, NY: McGraw-Hill, 2009, 580 pp. Coauthors: Robert Kravchuk and Richard Clerkin. Sixth Edition, 2005, 590 pp. Coauthor: Robert S. Kravchuk Also published by Peking University Press, PRC, with Chinese annotation. Fifth Edition, 2002. 622 pp. Coauthor: Robert S. Kravchuk; this and all previous editions with the assistance of Deborah Goldman (Rosenbloom). Translated into Chinese, Taiwan: Pro-Ed Publishing/McGraw Hill, 2002 Translated into Chinese, Beijing: Renmin University, 2003. Fourth Edition, 1998, 596 pp. Translated into Chinese, Taiwan: Pro-Ed Publishing/McGraw Hill, 2000. Third Edition, 1993, 573 pp. Second Edition, 1989, 517 pp. First Edition, 1986, 511 pp.

- Federal Service and the Constitution: The Development of the Public Employment Relationship, Second Edition, Washington DC: Georgetown University Press, 2014. 220 pp.

First Edition, Ithaca, NY: Cornell University Press, 1971. Cornell Studies in Civil Liberties. 267 pp.

- Public Administration and Law, Third Edition, Boca Raton, FL: Taylor & Francis, 2010, 329 pp. Coauthors: Rosemary O'Leary, Joshua Chanin.

Second Edition. NY: Marcel Dekker, 1997, 344 pp. Coauthor: Rosemary O'Leary. Translated into Chinese, PRC, Zhogshan (Sun Yat-Sen) University Press, Guangzhou, 2007. First Edition, NY: Marcel Dekker, 1983. 236 pp. (Sole author.)

- Personnel Management in Government, Sixth Edition. Boca Raton, FL: Taylor & Francis, 2007. 600 pp. Contributing coauthor, with Jay Shafritz; Katherine Naff and Norma Riccucci Norma M. Riccucci, principal authors.

Fifth Edition. NY: Marcel Dekker, 2001. 587 pp. Coauthors: Jay Shafritz, Katherine Naff, Norma M. Riccucci, Albert Hyde. Fourth Edition, 1992, 553 pp. Coauthors, Shafritz, Hyde, and Norma M. Riccucci. Translated into Chinese as Guo Wai Xing Zheng Xue Jing Dian Yi Cong. Beijing,: J.D. Publishers, 1997. Third Edition, 1986, 476 pp. Coauthors on this and earlier editions, Shafritz and Hyde. Second Edition, 1981, 436 pp. First Edition, 1978, 307 pp.

- A Reasonable Public Servant: Legal Challenges of American Public Service Armonk, NY: M.E. Sharpe 2005. 299 pp. Authorship: Yong S. Lee, senior author, in collaboration with David H. Rosenbloom.
- Building a Legislative-Centered Public Administration: Congress and the Administrative State, 1946–1999. Tuscaloosa, AL: University of Alabama Press, 2000. 199 pp.
- Constitutional Competence for Public Managers: Cases and Commentary. Itasca, Illinois: F.E. Peacock, 2000. 221 pp. Coauthors: James Carroll, Jonathan Carroll. (This is a thorough revision, major expansion, and updating of Toward Constitutional Competence, 1990, listed below.)

Translated into Chinese, Beijing: Renmin University Press, 2006.

- Toward Constitutional Competence: A Casebook for Public Administrators. Englewood Cliffs: Prentice-Hall, 1990. 174 pp. Coauthor: James D. Carroll.
- Essentials of Labor Relations. Reston, VA: Reston/Prentice Hall, 1985. Coauthor: Jay Shafritz. 264 pp.
- Representative Bureaucracy and the American Political System NY: Praeger Special Studies, 1981. Coauthor: Samuel Krislov. 208 pp. https://www.amazon.com/Representative-Bureaucracy-American-Political-System/dp/0030594472/ref=sr_1_1?ie=UTF8&s=books&qid=1259783848&sr=1-1
- Bureaucratic Government, USA. New York: St. Martin's Press, 1980. Coauthor: David Nachmias. 269 pp.
- Bureaucratic Culture: Citizens and Administrators in Israel London and New York: Croom Helm and St. Martin's Press, 1978. Coauthor: David Nachmias. 212 pp.
- Federal Equal Employment Opportunity: Politics and Public Personnel Administration. NY: Praeger, 1977. 184 pp.

=== Reports ===
- The United States Civil Service Commission's Role in the Federal Equal Employment Opportunity Program, 1965–1970. Washington: U.S. Civil Service Commission, 1970. Principal Author. 69 pp.
- Core Competencies for Federal Facilities Asset Management Through 2020: Transformational Strategies. Committee on Core Competencies for Federal Facilities Asset Management, 2005–2020, National Research Council of the National Academies. Washington, DC: National Academies Press, 2008. Committee member. 121 pp.
