= Frederick C. Mosher =

American professor of public administration

Frederick Camp "Fritz" Mosher (1913 – May 21, 1990 in Charlottesville, Virginia) was a professor of government and foreign affairs at the University of Virginia who strongly influenced a generation of scholars in public administration with his many writings, and government administrator. Mosher was an important member of the second generation of public administration scholars along with his close friend, Dwight Waldo, and others who helped define the modern structure and function of the field as taught in hundreds of PA programs around the world.

== Life ==
Mosher was a graduate of Dartmouth College. He has a master's degree from Syracuse University. He received his doctorate (Ph. D.) in public administration from Harvard University in 1950. He taught at Syracuse University, the University of California, Berkeley, and University of Bologna, before moving to the University of Virginia's Department of Government and Foreign Affairs.

He served with the Tennessee Valley Authority, the Public Administration Clearing House and the Los Angeles Department of Civil Service early in his career. Mosher, a specialist in budgeting and personnel administration, served as a consultant to several Government agencies and task forces and was editor in chief of Public Administration Review (1951–1954).

Mosher wrote widely on the subject of governance and public administration. He authored, coauthored, and edited books on subjects such as government staffing, presidential transitions, government agency reorganization, city services management, and the federal government's General Accounting Office (now Government Accountability Office).

Mosher perhaps is best known for his book, Democracy and the Public Service, published by Oxford University Press in 1968, a work that has influenced countless civil servants in governments around the world. According to Professor Jeremy F. Plant, a 1990 poll of public administration scholars "ranked Democracy and the Public Service as the fifth most influential book published between 1940 and 1990". In the book, which is a series of lectures, Mosher grapples with the evolving nature of the civil servants who staff agencies, and considers how they might be educated and trained, and how to reconcile their expertise with respect for democratic governance.

He died of emphysema on Monday, May 21, 1990, at his home in Charlottesville (VA) at the age of 76 years.

== Distinctions ==
- William E. Mosher and Frederick C. Mosher Award (William E. and/& Frederick C. Mosher Award, sometimes: William E. Mosher Award/Frederick C. Mosher Award)

== See also ==
- William E. Mosher

== Biography ==
- Max O. Stephenson Jr. and Jeremy Plant: The Legacy of Frederick C. Mosher. Public Administration Review, Vol. 51, No. 2, March/April 1991.
