= Camilla Stivers =

American academic

Camilla Stivers (born April 10, 1938) is a scholar and professor of Public Administration who is also known for her contributions in the fields of Urban Studies and Public service. Known primarily for her influential work “Bureau Men, Settlement Women: Constructing Public Administration in the Progressive Era”, Stivers has been published frequently and consistently throughout the years, and is seen as somewhat of an icon in the field of Public Administration. Although partially retired, Stivers currently serves as a professor and lecturer at Cleveland State University.

== Early life ==
She received a Masters Degree in Public Administration from the University of Southern California and a Ph.D. in public administration and policy from Virginia Tech. She later married German-born, Ralph P. Hummel (August 9, 1937 – March 20, 2012) a fellow professor of public administration at the University of Akron.

== Career ==
She is a former Albert A. Levin Professor of Urban Studies and Public Service at the Maxine Goodman Levin College of Urban Affairs at Cleveland State. She is also the Associate Editor of Public Administration Review. From 1968 to 1985, she was a practicing manager in public and community-based nonprofit organizations. In 1986-87 she was associate study director for the National Academy of Sciences /Institute of Medicine report, "The Future of Public Health." From 1987 to 1996 she was a member of the public administration faculty at the Evergreen State College in Olympia, Washington. She has been an active member of the American Society of Public Administration since 1979, serving on the national council, a variety of committees, and the Evergreen chapter board.

== Scholarly work ==
She is the author of Gender Images in Public Administration: Legitimacy and the Administrative State, for which she received the Distinguished Research Award from the Section on Women in Public Administration. She also authored Democracy, Bureaucracy, And the Study of Administration which was published in 2001. Stivers is a coauthor of Government is Us: Public Administration in an Anti-government Era, Bureau Men, Settlement Women: Constructing Public Administration in the Progressive Era, and has published widely in peer-reviewed journals. “Democratic Knowledge: Building Civic Capacity Through University Public Service” by Camilla Stivers, Ph.D. Presented at Valedictory Dinner to mark the conclusion of term as holder of the Albert A. Levin Chair in Urban Studies and Public Service, Maxine Goodman Levin College of Urban Affairs, Cleveland State University, October 29, 2002.

== Reviews ==
=== Review of Gender Images in Public Administration ===
The review of “Gender Images in Public Administration” by Hugh T. Miller from the University of Wisconsin Oshkosh, provides a helpful insight into Dr. Stivers’ views regarding feminism. Miller believes that the book informs and engages while simultaneously focusing on the major aspects that comprise the field of Public Administration.

=== Review of Bureau Men, Settlement Women: Constructing Public Administration in the Progressive Era ===
The review of “Bureau Men, Settlement Women: Constructing Public Administration in the Progressive Era” by historian and philosopher, John Forrester, raises several questions regarding the continued importance of mathematically and scientifically based classes for public administration students.

== Monographs ==
- Government is Us: Public Administration in an Anti-government Era
- Bureau Men, Settlement Women: Constructing Public Administration in the Progressive Era
- Governance in Dark Times: Practical Philosophy for Public Service (Georgetown University Press, 2008)
- Gender Images in Public Administration: Legitimacy and the Administrative State (Sage Publications)

== Articles ==
- Stivers, Camilla (Jan 2008). "Public Administration's Myth of Sisyphus". Administration & Society. 39 (8): 1008–1012. doi:10.1177/0095399707309814.
