= Norma M. Riccucci =

Norma Margherita Riccucci is Board of Governors Distinguished Professor of Public Administration at the School of Public Affairs and Administration at Rutgers University in Newark. She is a scholar in the field of Public Administration. An authority on issues related to social equity, affirmative action and public management, Riccucci is widely known for her work in the area of diversity management in government employment.

== Education ==
Riccucci is a graduate of Newington High School and earned a Bachelors of Public Administration from Florida International University in 1979. She holds a Masters of Public Administration (MPA) from the University of Southern California Los Angeles (1981) and received a PhD in public administration from the Maxwell School of Citizenship and Public Affairs at Syracuse University in 1984. Her doctoral thesis was entitled Unions And The Employment Patterns Of Women And Minorities In Local Government Work Forces and her thesis advisor was David H. Rosenbloom.

== Career ==
Riccucci was an assistant then associate professor in Public Administration at the University at Albany, SUNY from 1985-1998. She was Professor of Public Administration from 1998-2002. She became Professor of Public Administration at Rutgers University, Newark in 2002. Presently, she is Board of Governors Distinguished Professor at Rutgers University in Newark. In 2016, Riccucci was awarded the Dwight Waldo Award from the American Society for Public Administration. In 2018, she received the John Gaus Award from the American Political Science Association. Other awards include the H. George Frederickson Award from the Public Management Research Association (2020) and the Herbert Simon Award from the Midwest Political Science Association (2021). In 2022, Riccucci was awarded Doctor Honoris Causa from IDHEAP Swiss Graduate School of Public Administration.

== Works ==
- Critical Race Theory: Exploring its Application to Public Administration. Cambridge Elements Series, Cambridge University Press, 2022.
- Managing Diversity in Public Sector Workforces. New York: Routledge, 2nd edition, 2021.
- Policy Drift: Shared Powers and the Making of U.S. Law and Policy. New York: New York University Press, 2018.
- Public Administration: Traditions of Inquiry and Philosophies of Knowledge Washington, DC: Georgetown University Press, 2010
- How Management Matters: Street-Level Bureaucrats and Welfare Reform. Washington, DC: Georgetown University Press, 2005
- Managing Diversity in Public Sector Workforces. Boulder, CO: Westview Press, 2002
- Unsung Heroes: Federal Execucrats Making a Difference. Washington, DC: Georgetown University Press, 1995
- Personnel Management in Government, 6th ed. Boca Raton: Taylor & Francis, 2007. 600 pp. Coauthor: Katherine Naff; Contributing coauthors, Jay Shafritz and David H. Rosenbloom.
  - Fifth Edition. NY: Marcel Dekker, 2001. 587 pp. Coauthors: Jay Shafritz, Katherine Naff, David H. Rosenbloom, Albert Hyde.
  - Fourth Edition, 1992, 553 pp. Coauthors, Shafritz, Hyde, and David H. Rosenbloom.
  - Translated into Chinese as Guo Wai Xing Zheng Xue Jing Dian Yi Cong. Beijing,: J.D. Publishers, 1997.
- Personnel Management in Government: Current Concerns, Future Challenges, Sixth Edition, edited. New York: Routledge, 2018.
- Public Personnel Administration and Labor Relations, edited. Armonk, New York: M.E. Sharpe, 2007
- Riccucci, Norma M. (December 2010). "Envisioning Public Administration as a Scholarly Field in 2020: Rethinking Epistemic Traditions". Public Administration Review. 70: s304–s306. doi:10.1111/j.1540-6210.2010.02294.x. JSTOR 40984146. ProQuest 853425338.
- Riccucci, Norma M. (2009). "The Pursuit of Social Equity in the Federal Government: A Road Less Traveled?". Public Administration Review. 69 (3): 373–382. doi:10.1111/j.1540-6210.2009.01984.x. JSTOR 27697878.
- Riccucci, Norma M. (1 March 2008). "A Major Setback for Pay Equality: The Supreme Court's Decision in Ledbetter v. Goodyear Tire & Rubber Company". Review of Public Personnel Administration. 28 (1): 91–96. doi:10.1177/0734371X07310067. S2CID 154332498.
- Riccucci, Norma M. (2005). "Street-Level Bureaucrats and Intrastate Variation in the Implementation of Temporary Assistance for Needy Families Policies". Journal of Public Administration Research and Theory. 15 (1): 89–111. doi:10.1093/jopart/mui005. JSTOR 3525799.
