= Norton E. Long =

Norton Enneking Long (November 29, 1910 – December 30, 1993) was a noted author in the fields of urban politics and public administration and a professor at the Center of Public Administration & Policy, Virginia Polytechnic Institute He was the son of a professor at Harvard University, where he received his A.B. (1932), M.A. (1933) and Ph.D. (1937) in political science, and then studied in Germany. He taught at Harvard from 1935 to 1939, at Mount Holyoke College in 1939–40, and at Queens College from 1940 to 1942.

Long was noted for espousing the need for policies which mirrored a balance between reason and democratic processes, the necessity of doubting reformers who propose simple solutions and the need for a system of social accounts to ensure government accountability. Three of his most well-received essays are: "The local community as an ecology of games" (1958), "Power and administration" (1949) and "Bureaucracy and constitutionalism" (1952). "The polity", which was edited by Charles Press and published in 1962 by Rand McNally, contains a collection of seventeen of his essays.
