= Center for Public Administration and Policy =

Academic department of Virginia Tech

Virginia Tech Center for Public Administration and Policy
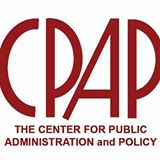
- Motto: Ut Prosim (Latin)
- Motto in English: That I May Serve
- Type: Public University
- Established: 1977
- Affiliations: Virginia Tech
- Chair: Sharon Mastracci
- Location: Blacksburg, Arlington, Richmond, in VA, USA
- Colors: Chicago maroon and Burnt orange
- Mascot: HokieBird
- Website: www.cpap.vt.edu

The Center for Public Administration and Policy (CPAP) is an academic department of Virginia Tech focused on public administration and public policy. It has campuses in Blacksburg, Arlington, and Richmond.

One of the center's founding faculty members, Gary Wamsley, wrote about its founding in a 1978 issue of the journal Dialogue, in which he said:

"The Center for Public Administration and Policy was established in 1977 to provide a focal point for the University's efforts in applying its intellectual resources to the amelioration of public sector problems and the enhancement of public service at local, state and national levels. ... The programs consist of advanced graduate studies at the post-master's level, basic and applied research, and a broad range of public service outreach and continuing education activities designed to meet the needs of the Commonwealth of Virginia and its citizens."
