= John Rohr =

John Anthony Rohr (July 31, 1934 – August 10, 2011) was an American political scientist who was Professor Emeritus at the Center for Public Administration and Policy at Virginia Tech. Rohr is particularly known as a leading scholar of the U.S. Constitution in relationship to civil servants and public administration.

He also received the prestigious Dwight Waldo Award from the American Society for Public Administration in 2002 for contributions to the literature and leadership of public administration. He was a Fellow at the Woodrow Wilson Center in Washington, D.C., and Fellow of the National Academy of Schools of Public Affairs and Administration.

One of Rohr's argument is that the Constitution pervades American society. Rohr wrote the book, Prophets Without Honor, which talked about the issue of Selective Conscientious Objection to war, detailing both the pros and cons of the possibility of such a policy.

While not a Straussian in the sense of, say, Harvey Mansfield, Rohr was a student of Leo Strauss and Herbert Storing during a famous period of political theory training at the University of Chicago that heavily influenced his future work and legendary seminar teaching style.

He died in Roanoke, Virginia, in 2011.

== Books ==
- To Run a Constitution: The Legitimacy of the Administrative State. Paperback – May 1, 1986, by John A. Rohr. Publisher: University Press of Kansas. Publication date: May 1, 1986. Print length: 288 pages. ISBN 0700603018.
- Public Service, Ethics, and Constitutional Practice (Studies in Government and Public Policy) by John A. Rohr. Publisher: University Press of Kansas. Publication date: December 7, 1998. 192 pages. ISBN 0700609261.
