= Louis C. Gawthrop =

Louis C. Gawthrop is Eminent Scholar and Professor, Government and Public Administration at the University of Baltimore.

He was editor-in-chief of Public Administration Review from 1978 to 1984.

He received his Ph.D. from Johns Hopkins University.

== Publications ==
- Bureaucratic Behavior in the Executive Branch
- The Administrative Process and Democratic Theory
- Administrative Politics and Social Change
- Public Sector Management, Systems, and Ethics
- Public Service and Democracy: Ethical Imperatives for the 21st Century
