= Dwight Waldo =

American political scientist

- Born: September 28, 1913; De Witt, Nebraska, U.S.
- Died: October 27, 2000 (aged 87)
- Education: University of Nebraska (BA); Yale University (PhD)
- Known for: Theory of Bureaucratic Government
- Scientific career
- Fields: Public administration
- Workplaces: University of California, Berkeley; Syracuse University; Virginia Tech
- Thesis: The Administrative State (1948)
- Doctoral advisor: Francis Coker

Clifford Dwight Waldo (September 28, 1913 – October 27, 2000) was an American political scientist and major figure in modern public administration. Waldo's career was often directed against a scientific/technical portrayal of bureaucracy and government that now suggests the term public management as opposed to public administration. Waldo is recognized the world over for his contributions to the theory of bureaucratic government.

== Life and career ==
Born in rural DeWitt, Nebraska, and trained first in a local Wesleyan college and then a Nebraska normal school as a teacher, Waldo was eventually educated in political theory at the University of Nebraska (MA) and Yale University (PhD) where he was advised by Francis Coker.

He came to shape much of the future of scholarship in the fields of political theory and Public Administration. His Yale dissertation was reworked after civil service during World War II into a work of public administration called The Administrative State, published in 1948. Waldo challenged mainstream scholars' view of public administration as a value-free, non-partisan social science that promised to make government more efficient and effective. Professor Camilla Stivers has observed, "Despite public administration's claim to be a science, Waldo declares, it is a political theory [....] Political theory looks to error in the world and aims to envision new possibilities. It is critical rather than objective, suggestive rather than conclusive." In short, "efficiency" itself is a value, and it can run counter to other values, such as democratic participation in governance.

Waldo also is famous for the debate he had with Herbert A. Simon on the nature of bureaucracy in American Political Science Review just after World War II. Eventually he taught at the University of California, Berkeley and the Maxwell School at Syracuse University, and Virginia Tech where he influenced many future scholars of government. He had profound influence on a number of young academics in the late 1960s by organizing the Minnowbrook Conference. Others deeply indebted to Waldo for guidance and sponsorship include H. George Frederickson and Gary Wamsley.

== Selected publications ==
- The Administrative State: a Study of the Political Theory of American Public Administration (New York: Ronald Press Co, 1948; rev ed New York: Holmes & Meier, 1984)
- The study of public administration (New York : Random House, 1955)
- Perspectives on administration (University of Alabama Press, 1956)
- The novelist on organization & administration; an inquiry into the relationship between two worlds (Berkeley: Institute of Governmental Studies, University of California, 1968) Development A
- Ideas and Issues in Public Administration.(1953)
- Comparative Public Administration – Prologue Problems and Promise
- The Enterprise of Public Administration.
- Temporal Dimensions of Development Administration. (1970) – editor
- Public administration in Time Of Turbulence! (1971) – editor
