= List of public administration schools =

This is an incomplete list of public administration and public policy schools, colleges and faculties; divided by country.

== International ==
- London School of Economics
- European Institute of Public Administration
- Monterey Institute of International Studies at Middlebury College
- Higher Institute For Professional Development And Training (HIPDET)
- SADAT Academy for public administration -EGYPT-
- School of Global Affairs and Public Policy (GAPP) at American University in Cairo (AUC), Egypt.

== Australia ==
=== Australian Capital Territory ===
- Crawford School of Public Policy at The Australian National University
- Institute for Governance and Policy Analysis (IGPA) at the University of Canberra

=== New South Wales ===
- Master of Public Policy at the University of Sydney
- Master of Public Administration at the University of Sydney
- Master of Politics and Public Policy at Macquarie University

=== Queensland ===
- Department of Politics and Public Policy at Griffith University
- Master of Governance and Public Policy at the University of Queensland

=== South Australia ===
- Flinders Institute of Public Policy and Management at Flinders University

=== Victoria ===
- Faculty of Business and Economics at Monash University
- Melbourne School of Government at Melbourne University

=== Western Australia ===
- Sir Walter Murdoch School of Public Policy and International Affairs at Murdoch University

=== Tasmania ===
- Master of Public Policy at University of Tasmania

== Brazil ==
Universidade Estadual Paulista "Júlio de Mesquita Filho" (UNESP)

- Administração Pública - Faculdade de Ciências e Letras de Araraquara

Fundação Escola Nacional de Administração Pública (Enap)

- Políticas públicas, gestão e administração pública

Fundação Getúlio Vargas (FGV)

- Escola Brasileira de Administração Pública e de Empresas (EBAPE, Brazilian School of Public and Business Administration)
- Escola de Pós-Graduação em Economia (EPGE, Graduate School of Economics)

Universidade de Brasília (UnB)

- Gestão de Políticas Públicas

Sciences Center of Administration and Socioeconomic ESAG, State University of Santa Catarina UDESC

== Canada ==
=== Alberta ===
- School of Public Policy at the University of Calgary

=== British Columbia ===
- School of Public Policy at the Simon Fraser University
- School of Public Administration at the University of Victoria
- School of Public Policy and Global Affairs at the University of British Columbia

=== Manitoba ===
- Faculty of Arts: Political Science, at the University of Manitoba

=== New Brunswick ===
- Maîtrise en administration publique (MPA) at Université de Moncton

=== Nova Scotia ===
- School of Public Administration at Dalhousie University

=== Ontario ===
- School of Public Policy and Administration at Carleton University
- School of Policy Studies at Queen's University at Kingston
- Master of Public Administration (MPA) at the Royal Military College of Canada
- Master of Arts in Public Policy and Administration at Toronto Metropolitan University
- MA Public Policy and Administration, Department of Political Science at the University of Guelph
- Graduate School of Public and International Affairs at the University of Ottawa
- Munk School of Global Affairs and Public Policy at the University of Toronto
- Master of Public Service, Dean of Arts at the University of Waterloo
- Local Government Program (MPA & DPA) at University of Western Ontario
- School of Public Policy and Administration at York University
- School of Public and International Affairs at the Glendon College, York University

=== Quebec ===
- Master in Public Policy and Public Administration (MPPPA), at Concordia University
- Master of Public Affairs (MPA), at Université Laval
- Master of Public Policy (MPP), Max Bell School of Public Policy, at McGill University
- Department of Political Science at Université de Montréal
- Master of Public Administration (MPA), at École nationale d'administration publique, Université du Québec
- Master in Administration, Concentration Public Management at Université de Sherbrooke

=== Saskatchewan ===
- Johnson Shoyama Graduate School of Public Policy at the University of Regina and University of Saskatchewan

== Chile ==
- Institute of Public Affairs of the University of Chile
- Faculty of Politics and Government, Central University of Chile
- Departamento of Public Policy and Management, University of Santiago of Chile
- School of Government, Pontifical Catholic University of Chile

== China ==
- China National School of Administration
- Tsinghua University
- Peking University
- Shanghai Jiao Tong University
- Fudan University
- Nanjing University

== Colombia ==
- Escuela Superior de Administración Pública

== Costa Rica ==
- Escuela de Administración Pública, Universidad de Costa Rica

== Finland ==
- Master of Administrative Sciences at University of Lapland
- Master of Administrative Sciences at University of Tampere
- Master of Administrative Sciences at University of Vaasa

== France ==
- School of Public Affairs, Sciences Po
- Institut National des Etudes Territoriales
- École nationale d'administration

== Germany ==
- Hertie School of Governance, Berlin
- Willy Brandt School of Public Policy, Erfurt
- German University of Administrative Sciences Speyer, Speyer
- University of Konstanz, Konstanz
- Federal University of Applied Administrative Sciences, Brühl

== Greece ==
National Centre for Public Administration & Local Government (EKDDA)

- Panteion University Department of Public Administration

== Hong Kong ==
- Department of Politics and Public Administration, Faculty of Social Science, The University of Hong Kong - Master of Public Administration (MPA)
- Faculty of Social Sciences and School of Business, Hong Kong Baptist University - Master of Public Administration (MPA)

== Hungary ==
- Faculty of Political Sciences and Public Administration, National University of Public Service, Budapest
- School of Public Policy, Central European University, Budapest - Master of Public Administration (MPA)

== India ==
- Department of Public Administration, Assam Don Bosco University, Sonapur, Assam
- Department of Public Administration, Jamia Milia Islamia, New Delhi
- Department of Public Administration, Kurukshetra University Kurukshetra, Haryana
- Department of public administration, Rajasthan University, Jaipur
- Department of Public Administration, Osmania University, Hyderabad
- Department of Public Administration, Panjab University, Chandigarh
- Department of Public Administration, University of Lucknow
- Indian School of Business, Hyderabad
- Department of Local Governance, Rajiv Gandhi National Institute of Youth Development, Sriperumbudur, Tamil Nadu
- Indian Institute of Public Administration, New Delhi
- Madras Christian College (Autonomous), Chennai
- Lal Bahadur Shastri National Academy of Administration
- Division of Public Administration, Department of Political Science, Aligarh Muslim University, Aligarh
- Amity Institute Of Public Policy, Amity University Noida.
- The Hindu Centre for Public Policy
- Tata Institute of Social Sciences, Hyderabad - Master of Arts in Public Policy and Governance (MA PPG)
- St. Xaviers College(Autonomous), Mumbai
- National Law School of India University, Bangalore - Master of Public Policy (MPP)
- Jindal School of Government and Public Policy, New Delhi
- Indian Institute of Management, Bangalore - PGPPM, Centre for public Policy (CPP)
- Management Development Institute - School Of Public Policy And Governance
- N.S. Patel Arts College, Anand, Gujarat
- The Takshashila Institution The Takshashila Institution, an independent think tank and a school of public policy.
- Department of Public Administration, Punjabi University, Patiala, Punjab
- Andhra University, Visakhapatnam
- Sri Sri University, Cuttack
- Department of Politics and Public Administration, University Of Madras, Chennai
- Department of Public Administration, Mizoram University, Aizawl
- Department of Public Administration, Dr. Babasaheb Ambedkar Marathwada University, Aurangabad, Maharashtra
- Department of Public Administration, Magadh University, BodhGaya, Bihar
- Department of Public Administration, Central University, Kerala
- Department of Public Administration, School of Social Science, Indira Gandhi National Open University

== Indonesia ==
- Faculty of administrative sciences in University of Indonesia
- Faculty of administrative sciences in University of Brawijaya
- The School of Government and Public Policy

== Ireland ==
- Institute of Public Administration
- Public Affairs Ireland

== Israel ==
- University of Haifa Public Management and Policy Program

== Italy ==
- Bocconi University
- SNA - Scuola Nazionale dell'Amministrazione
- Luiss School of Government at Libera Università Internazionale degli Studi Sociali Guido Carli, Rome

== Japan ==
- National Graduate Institute for Policy Studies, Tokyo
- Graduate School of Public Policy, University of Tokyo, Tokyo
- Faculty of Public Management, Keio University, Kanagawa

== Kazakhstan ==
- Kazakhstan Institute of Management, Economics and Strategic Research

== Kenya ==
- University of Nairobi, Kenya School of Government
- Moi University
- Kenyatta University
- Mount Kenya University

== Korea, South ==
- National HRD Institute, Ministry of Personnel Management
- Seoul National University Graduate School of Public Administration
- Korea University Graduated School of Public Administration
- Yonsei University Graduated School of Public Administration
- Hanyang University Greaduated School of Public Administration
- KDI School of Public Policy and Management

== Mexico ==
- UNAM - Universidad Nacional Autonoma de Mexico
- Universidad Panamericana
- INAP - Instituto Nacional de Administración Pública
- TIC - Tecnológico Iberoamericano Coyoacán

== Nepal ==
=== Kathmandu ===
- Tribhuvan University
- Public Administration Campus (PAC)

=== Biratnagar ===
- Mahendra Morang Multiple Campus (MMC)

== Netherlands ==
- Maastricht Graduate School of Governance
- Master Public Administration, Erasmus University Rotterdam
- Leiden University

== Malaysia ==
- Faculty of Administrative Science and Policy Studies, UiTM Shah Alam
- Master of Public Policy, International Institute of Public Policy & Management, University Malaya
- Master of Public Administration (MPA), Universiti Sains Malaysia

== Pakistan ==
Department Of Public Administration Government College University Faisalabad

- PIDE School of Public Policy, Pakistan Institute of Development Economics, Islamabad.
- Department of Government & Public Policy at the National Defence University, Islamabad
- Fatima Jinnah Women University, Rawalpindi
- National University of Modern Languages, Islamabad
- Department of Public Administration, Gomal University, Dera Ismail Khan
- Institute of Administrative Sciences, University of the Punjab, Lahore
- Department of Public Administration at the University of Karachi
- School of Management sciences Quaid-I-Azam University Islamabad
- Department of Institute of Social Science at the Bahauddin Zakariya University, Multan
- Department of Public Administration, School of Social Sciences and Humanities, NUST University, Islamabad

== Philippines ==
- Ateneo School of Government at the Ateneo de Manila University
- Master of Public Administration at Pamantasan ng Lungsod ng Maynila (University of City of Manila)
- National College of Public Administration and Governance at University of the Philippines Diliman
- UPLB College of Public Affairs - Institute of Development Management and Governance, University of the Philippines Los Baños
- College of Public Administration and Development at Western Mindanao State University
- Jose Rizal University Graduate School at Jose Rizal University Shaw Blvd. Mandaluyong
- Master of Public Administration at Guimaras State University McLain, Buenavista, Guimaras
- Mindanao State University's College of Public Affairs at the Mindanao State University Main Campus
- School of Public Affairs and Governance at Silliman University
- PUP Graduate School, from 1975 to 2012, now College of Public Administration and Governance effective School Year 2012–2013 at the Polytechnic University of the Philippines
- University of Santo Tomas Graduate School at the University of Santo Tomas
- College of Public Administration & Governance at the University of Northern Philippines
- Master of Public Administration at the Cebu Technological University
- College of Governance and Public Policy at the University of Makati
- Master of Public Administration at Metro-Dagupan Colleges
- Master of Public Administration at Southern Mindanao Colleges Pagadian City
- Bachelor of Public Administration at Trece Martires City College

== Poland ==
- Białystok School of Public Administration
- Poznań University of Economics and Business

== Portugal ==
Universities

- Department of Social, Political and Territorial Sciences, University of Aveiro
- Faculty of Law, University of Coimbra
- School of Social and Political Sciences, University of Lisbon
- School of Economics and Management, University of Minho

Polytechnic institutes

- School of Communication, Public Management and Tourism, Polytechnic Institute of Bragança
- School of Management, Polytechnic Institute of Cávado e do Ave
- Institute of Accounting and Administration, Polytechnic Institute of Coimbra
- School of Technology and Management, Polytechnic Institute of Leiria
- Institute of Accounting and Administration, Polytechnic Institute of Lisboa
- Institute of Accounting and Administration, Polytechnic Institute of Porto
- School of Technology and Management, University of Aveiro

== Russia ==
- Russian Presidential Academy of National Economy and Public Administration

== Singapore ==
- Lee Kuan Yew School of Public Policy, National University of Singapore
- Nanyang Centre of Public Administration, Nanyang Technological University, Singapore

== South Africa ==
- School of Public Management & Administration, University of Pretoria
- School of Public Leadership University of Stellenbosch
- Faculty of Management and Commerce (Department of Public Administration) University of Fort Hare
- College of Economic and Management Sciences University of South Africa

== Spain ==
=== State ===
- Instituto Nacional de Administración Pública (INAP), Menéndez Pelayo International University (UIMP)

=== Catalonia ===
- Escola d'Administració Pública de Catalunya

=== Euskadi ===
- Herri Arduralaritzaren Euskal Erakundea - Instituto Vasco de Administraciones Públicas

=== Galicia ===
- Escola Galega de Administración Pública

=== Navarre ===
- Nafarroako Administrazio Publikoaren Institutoa - Instituto Navarro de Administración Pública

== Sweden ==
- School of Public Administration at University of Gothenburg

== Switzerland ==
- Center of Competence for Public Management at University of Bern
- Master in Public Management at University of Geneva
- Swiss Graduate School of Public Administration at University of Lausanne
- Swiss School of Public Governance at ETH Zurich

== Taiwan ==
- National Chengchi University
- College of Humanities and Social Sciences, National Dong Hwa University - Master of Public Administration (MPA)

== Thailand ==
- National Institute of Development Administration
- Faculty of Political Science, Chulalongkorn University
- Faculty of Political Science, Thammasat University

== Turkey ==
- Ankara University Political Science and Public Administration
- Istanbul Medipol University Political Science and Public Administration
- Yeditepe University Department of Public Administration
- Yeditepe University M.A. in Local Government and Governance
- Sabancı University Public Policy Program

== Uganda ==
- Bugema University
- Gulu University
- Kabale University
- Makerere University
- Uganda Management Institute

== Ukraine ==
- National Academy of Public Administration, under the President of Ukraine

== United Kingdom ==
=== England ===
- Institute of Local Government Studies (INLOGOV), University of BirminghamInlogov website
- Department of Social Policy and Intervention, University of Oxford
- Department of Politics and International Studies University of Cambridge
- Department of Leadership and HRM, Newcastle Business School
- Blavatnik School of Government, University of Oxford
- School of Public Policy, London School of Economics and Political Science
- The Centre for Financial and Management Studies, SOAS, University of London
- London South Bank University
- University College London
- University of Portsmouth
- Centre for International Development, University of Bradford
- University of York
- School of Sociology and Social Policy, University of Nottingham

=== Scotland ===
- School of Arts, Social Sciences and Management, Queen Margaret University, Edinburgh

== United States ==
=== Alabama ===
- Auburn University College of Liberal Arts
- Auburn University, Montgomery College of Liberal Arts & Social Sciences
- Jacksonville State University Political Science & Public Administration
- Troy University College of Arts and Sciences
- University of Alabama College of Arts and Sciences
- University of Alabama at Birmingham Department of Government
- University of Alabama in Huntsville College of Liberal Arts
- University of South Alabama College of Arts and Sciences

=== Alaska ===
- University of Alaska Anchorage College of Business and Public Policy
- University of Alaska Southeast School of Management

=== Arizona ===
- Grand Canyon University Ken Blanchard College of Business
- Northern Arizona University The College of Social & Behavioral Sciences
- University of Arizona College of Social & Behavioral Sciences
- Watts College of Public Service & Community Solutions

=== Arkansas ===
- Arkansas State University College of Liberal Arts and Communication
- Southern Arkansas University College of Liberal and Performing Arts
- University of Arkansas J. William Fulbright College of Arts and Sciences
- University of Arkansas at Little Rock Institute of Government

=== California ===
- Brandman University School of Business & Professional Studies
- California Lutheran University School of Management
- California Polytechnic State University College of Liberal Arts
- California State University, Bakersfield School of Business and Public Administration
- California State University, Chico The College of Behavioral & Social Sciences
- California State University, Dominguez Hills College of Business Administration & Public Policy
- California State University, East Bay College of Letters, Arts & Social Sciences
- California State University, Fresno Department of Political Science
- California State University, Fullerton College of Humanities and Social Sciences; Division of Politics, Administration, and Justice
- California State University, Long Beach Graduate Center for Public Policy & Administration
- California State University, Los Angeles Department of Political Science
- California State University, Northridge Roland Tseng College of Extended Learning
- California State University, Sacramento College of Social Sciences and Interdisciplinary Studies
- California State University, San Bernardino College of Business and Public Administration
- California State University, Stanislaus College of the Arts, Humanities and Social Sciences
- Monterey Institute of International Studies at Middlebury College
- National University School of Professional Studies
- Naval Postgraduate School Graduate School of Business and Public Policy
- Northcentral University School of Business Administration
- Pepperdine University School of Public Policy
- San Diego State University School of Public Affairs
- San Francisco State University Department of Public Administration
- San Jose State University Department of Political Science
- Sonoma State University School of Social Sciences
- Stanford University School of Humanities and Sciences
- University of California, Berkeley Goldman School
- University of California, Irvine School of Social Ecology
- University of California, Los Angeles Luskin School of Public Affairs
- University of California, Riverside School of Public Policy, as of Fall 2015
- University of La Verne College of Business and Public Management
- University of the Pacific Pacific McGeorge School of Law
- University of San Francisco School of Management
- University of Southern California Sol Price School of Public Policy

=== Colorado ===
- Colorado Christian University College of Adult and Graduate Studies
- University of Colorado Colorado Springs School of Public Affairs
- University of Colorado Denver School of Public Affairs
- University of Denver Institute for Public Policy Studies

=== Connecticut ===
- Fairfield University College of Arts & Sciences
- Trinity College Department of Public Policy and Law
- University of Connecticut Department of Public Policy
- University of New Haven Henry C. Lee School of Public Service

=== Delaware ===
- Delaware State University College of Arts, Humanities and Social Sciences
- University of Delaware Joseph R. Biden, Jr. School of Public Policy & Administration

=== District of Columbia ===
- American University School of Public Affairs
- Gallaudet University
- The George Washington University Trachtenberg School of Public Policy and Public Administration
- Georgetown University McCourt School of Public Policy
- Johns Hopkins University

=== Florida ===
- Frank J. Rooney School of Adult and Continuing Education at Barry University
- School of Public Administration at Florida Atlantic University
- Division of Public Affairs at Florida Gulf Coast University
- Department of Public Administration at Florida International University
- Askew School of Public Administration and Policy at Florida State University
- Jacksonville University Public Policy Institute
- H. Wayne Huizenga School of Business and Entrepreneurship at Nova Southeastern University
- University of Central Florida School of Public Administration
- Bob Graham Center for Public Service at the University of Florida
- University of Miami Master of Public Administration Program
- Department of Political Science and Public Administration at the University of North Florida
- Public Administration Program at the University of South Florida
- Master of Science in Administration at the University of West Florida

=== Georgia ===
- Albany State University Department of History, Political Science and Public Administration
- Augusta University Department of Political Science
- Clark Atlanta University Department of Public Administration
- Columbus State University Department of Political Science, The Graduate School
- Georgia College & State University College of Arts and Sciences
- Georgia Institute of Technology School of Public Policy
- Georgia Southern University Department of Public and Nonprofit Studies
- Georgia State University Andrew Young School of Policy Studies
- Kennesaw State University Department of Political Science and International Affairs
- Savannah State University Department of Political Science, Public Administration & Urban Studies
- University of Georgia Department of Public Administration and Policy
- University of West Georgia Department of Political Science
- Valdosta State University Department of Political Science

=== Guam ===
- University of Guam College of Liberal Arts & Social Sciences

=== Idaho ===
- Boise State University School of Public Service
- University of Idaho College of Letters, Arts and Social Sciences

=== Illinois ===
- Aurora University Master of Public Administration
- DePaul University School of Public Service
- Governors State University
- Illinois Institute of Technology
- National Louis University Master of Public Administration
- Northern Illinois University Division of Public Administration
- Northwestern University Master of Public Policy and Administration
- Southern Illinois University Carbondale Master of Public Administration
- Southern Illinois University Edwardsville, Master of Public Administration
- University of Chicago, Harris School of Public Policy Studies
- University of Illinois Chicago College of Urban Planning and Public Affairs
- University of Illinois Springfield

=== Indiana ===
- Ball State University
- Indiana State University
- Indiana University Bloomington
- Indiana University–Purdue University Indianapolis
- Indiana University South Bend
- Indiana Wesleyan University

=== Iowa ===
- Ashford University
- Drake University
- University of Northern Iowa
- Upper Iowa University

=== Kansas ===
- University of Kansas School of Public Affairs and Administration
- Wichita State University Hugo Wall School
- Kansas State University Department of Political Science

=== Kentucky ===
- Eastern Kentucky University
- Northern Kentucky University
- Murray State University
- University of Louisville
- University of Kentucky
- Western Kentucky University

=== Louisiana ===
- Tulane University School of Professional Advancement
- Grambling State University Department of Political Science & Public Administration
- Louisiana State University, E. J. Ourso College of Business, Public Administration Institute
- LSU New Orleans
- Southern University Nelson Mandela School of Public Policy and Urban Affairs
- University of Louisiana at Monroe

=== Maryland ===
- Bowie State University
- Johns Hopkins Institute for Policy Studies
- University of Maryland, Baltimore County, School of Public Policy
- University of Maryland, College Park, Maryland School of Public Policy
- University of Baltimore College of Public Affairs

=== Massachusetts ===
- Brandeis University Heller School for Social Policy and Management
- Clark University, College of Professional and Continuing Education
- Harvard University John F. Kennedy School of Government
- Northeastern University School of Public Policy and Urban Affairs
- Tufts University Department of Urban and Environmental Policy and Planning
- University of Massachusetts Amherst Center for Public Policy and Administration
- University of Massachusetts Boston John W. McCormack School of Policy and Global Studies
- University of Massachusetts Lowell College of Fine Arts, Humanities and Social Sciences
- Suffolk University, Sawyer Business School
- Bridgewater State University
- Framingham State University
- Westfield State University

=== Michigan ===
- Central Michigan University College of Humanities and Social and Behavioral Sciences, Political Science Department
- Eastern Michigan University College of Arts and Sciences, Political Science Department
- Grand Valley State University School of Public, Nonprofit and Health Administration
- Michigan State University, James Madison College
- Northern Michigan University
- Oakland University, College of Arts and Sciences, Political Science Department
- University of Michigan, Gerald R. Ford School of Public Policy
- Wayne State University
- Western Michigan University, College of Arts and Sciences, School of Public Affairs and Administration

=== Minnesota ===
- Saint Mary's University of Minnesota Masters in Human Resources Program
- University of Minnesota Hubert H. Humphrey School of Public Affairs
- University of St. Thomas Public Policy and Leadership Program
- Hamline University (Minnesota) Hamline University School of Business Master's in Public Administration
- Capella University Master of Public Administration

=== Missouri ===
- Missouri State University College of Humanities and Public Affairs
- Park University Hauptmann School of Public Affairs
- Saint Louis University MPA and PhD Public Policy Analysis
- Harry S Truman School of Public Affairs at the University of Missouri
- University of Missouri–Kansas City Henry W. Bloch School of Management

=== Montana ===
- Montana State University
- University of Montana

=== Nebraska ===
- University of Nebraska at Omaha College of Public Affairs and Community Service

=== Nevada ===
- University of Nevada at Las Vegas Greenspun College of Urban Affairs
- University of Nevada at Reno College of Liberal Arts

=== New Hampshire ===
- University of New Hampshire Carsey School of Public Policy

=== New Jersey ===
- Monmouth University Wayne D. McMurray School of Humanities and Social Sciences
- Kean University Nathan Weiss Graduate School
- Fairleigh Dickinson University School of Public & Global Affairs
- Princeton University Princeton School of Public and International Affairs
- Seton Hall University Department of Political Science and Public Affairs
- Rutgers University Bloustein School of Planning and Public Policy
- School of Public Affairs and Administration (Rutgers-Newark)
- Rutgers University Public Policy and Administration (Rutgers-Camden)
- Saint Peter's University

=== New Mexico ===
- New Mexico State University College of Arts and Sciences
- New Mexico Highlands University College of Arts and Sciences
- University of New Mexico School of Public Administration

University of the Southwest School of Business

=== New York ===
- Binghamton University
- SUNY Brockport Graduate School
- Buffalo State University
- City University of New York Baruch College
- City University of New York City College
- City University of New York John Jay College of Criminal Justice
- Columbia University School of International and Public Affairs (SIPA)
- College of New Rochelle Graduate School
- Cornell University Institute for Public Affairs (CIPA)
- SUNY Empire State University
- Excelsior College
- Hilbert College
- Long Island University
- Milano School of Management, Policy, and Environment
- New York University Wagner Graduate School of Public Service
- Syracuse University Maxwell School
- University at Albany Rockefeller College of Public Affairs and Policy
- Pace University
- Metropolitan College of New York
- Marist University

=== North Carolina ===
- Appalachian State University College of Arts and Sciences
- Duke University Sanford School of Public Policy
- East Carolina University Thomas Harriot College of Arts and Sciences
- North Carolina Central University College of Arts and Sciences
- North Carolina State University School of Public and International Affairs
- University of North Carolina at Chapel Hill School of Government
- University of North Carolina at Charlotte College of Liberal Arts & Sciences
- University of North Carolina at Greensboro College of Arts and Sciences
- University of North Carolina at Pembroke College of Arts and Sciences
- University of North Carolina at Wilmington College of Arts and Science
- Western Carolina University College of Arts and Sciences

=== North Dakota ===
- University of North Dakota College of Business & Public Administration

=== Ohio ===
- University of Dayton Master of Public Administration
- Bowling Green State University Master of Public Administration
- Cleveland State University Maxine Goodman Levin College of Urban Affairs
- Kent State University Masters of Public Administration
- Ohio State University John Glenn College of Public Affairs
- Ohio University Voinovich School of Leadership and Public Affairs
- University of Akron Department of Public Administration and Urban Studies
- Wright State University Master of Public Administration

=== Oklahoma ===
- University of Central Oklahoma Department of Political Science
- University of Oklahoma Department of Political Science

=== Oregon ===
- Oregon State University School of Public Policy
- Portland State University Hatfield School of Government
- University of Oregon Department of Planning, Public Policy and Management

=== Pennsylvania ===
- Carnegie Mellon University H. John Heinz III College
- Gannon University
- Marywood University
- Pennsylvania State University at Harrisburg School of Public Affairs
- Shippensburg University of Pennsylvania
- University of Pennsylvania Fels Institute of Government
- University of Pittsburgh Graduate School of Public and International Affairs
- Villanova University Department of Public Administration, College of Liberal Arts and Sciences
- West Chester University
- Widener University

=== Puerto Rico ===
- University of Puerto Rico Escuela de Ciencias Sociales
- University of Puerto Rico, Río Piedras Campus Escuela Graduada de Administración Pública

=== Rhode Island ===
- Brown University Watson Institute for International and Public Affairs
- Roger Williams University School of Justice Studies
- University of Rhode Island School of Political Science administered jointly by the University of Rhode Island and Rhode Island College

=== South Carolina ===
- University of South Carolina Department of Political Science
- Clemson University The Strom Thurmond Institute of Government & Public Affairs
- College of Charleston Department of Political Science

=== Tennessee ===
- East Tennessee State University
- Tennessee State University
- University of Tennessee
- University of Memphis
- Vanderbilt University Peabody School of Education and Human Development

=== Texas ===
- Lamar University
- Sam Houston State University Department of Political Science
- Stephen F. Austin State University Department of Government
- Sul Ross State University Department of Political Science
- Texas A&M George Bush School of Government and Public Service
- Texas A&M University Corpus Christi Department of Social Science
- Texas State University Department of Political Science
- Texas Tech University Department of Political Science
- University of Houston
- University of North Texas
- University of Texas at Arlington School of Urban and Public Affairs
- University of Texas at Austin Lyndon B. Johnson School of Public Affairs
- University of Texas at Brownsville Master of Public Policy and Management
- University of Texas at Dallas School of Economic, Political, and Policy Sciences
- University of Texas–Pan American Department of Public Affairs and Securities Studies
- University of Texas at San Antonio School of Public Policy
- University of Texas at El Paso University College
- University of Texas Permian Basin Master of Public Administration
- University of Texas at Tyler College of Arts and Sciences
- Wayland Baptist University School of Behavioral and Social Sciences

=== United States Virgin Islands ===
- University of the Virgin Islands College of Liberal Arts & Social Sciences

=== Utah ===
- Brigham Young University George W. Romney Institute of Public Management
- Southern Utah University
- University of Utah Institute of Public and International Affairs, and The Center for Public Policy and Administration

=== Vermont ===
- Norwich University
- University of Vermont

=== Virginia ===
- Virginia Commonwealth University, L. Douglas Wilder School of Government and Public Affairs
- George Mason University, Schar School of Policy and Government
- James Madison University College of Arts and Letters
- Liberty University Helms School of Government
- Virginia Tech Center for Public Administration and Policy
- Old Dominion University Department of Urban Studies and Public Administration
- University of Virginia Batten School of Leadership and Public Policy
- College of William & Mary The Thomas Jefferson Program in Public Policy
- Regent University

=== Washington ===
- Central Washington University Master of Science in Public Administration (MsPA)
- Eastern Washington University Graduate Program in Public Administration (PADM)
- The Evergreen State College Master of Public Administration
- Seattle University Master of Public Administration
- University of Washington Evans School of Public Policy and Governance

=== West Virginia ===
- American Public University System
- West Virginia University

=== Wisconsin ===
- University of Wisconsin–Madison Robert M. La Follette School of Public Affairs
- University of Wisconsin–Whitewater

=== Wyoming ===
- University of Wyoming College of Arts and Sciences
