= Master of Public Policy and Administration =

Graduate-level professional degree

The Master of Public Policy and Administration (MPPA) is a graduate-level professional degree that blends the theoretical and practical aspects of public administration and policy analysis. Tailored for individuals aspiring to contribute to the public and non-profit sectors, the MPPA provides students with a multidisciplinary understanding of governance, management, and evidence-based policy-making. This degree equips graduates to design, analyze, and implement public policies and programs in diverse settings, both domestically and internationally.

== Similar degrees ==
Similar degrees within the domain of Public Affairs include:

- Master of Public Affairs (M.P.A. or M.P.Aff.)
- Master of Public Policy (M.P.P.)
- Master of Public Administration (M.P.A. or M.P.Adm.)
- Master of Public Service (M.P.S.)
- Master of Science in Administration (M.S.A.)
- Master of Science in Management (M.S.M. or M.I.M.)
- Master of Science in Public Affairs
- Master of Science in Public Policy (M.S.P.P.)
- Master of Arts in Law and Diplomacy (M.A.L.D.)
- Master of Arts in International Policy Studies (MAIPS)
- Master of Public Management (M.P.M.)
- Master of Governmental Administration (M.G.A.)
- Master of Urban Planning (M.U.P.)
- Master of City Planning (M.C.P.)
- Master of Regional Planning (M.R.P.)
- Master of Urban and Regional Planning (M.U.R.P.)
- Master of International Affairs (M.I.A.)
- Master of Global Policy Studies (MGPS)
- Master of Nonprofit Organizations (MNPO or MNO)

== See also ==
- Public policy degrees
- Public policy schools
- Master of Public Administration
- Master of Public Policy
- List of public administration schools
