= Public policy school =

University program on public policy

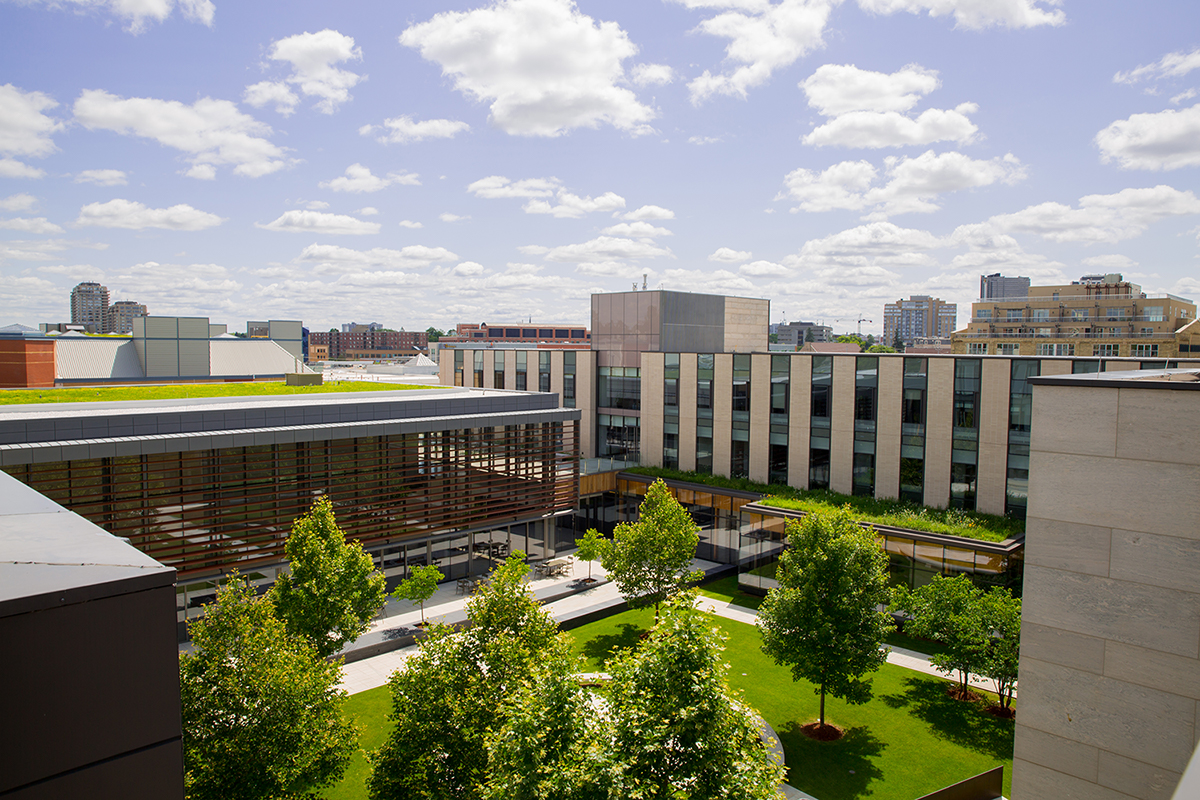
CIGI Campus and the Balsillie School of International Affairs (BSIA) in Waterloo, Ontario

A public policy school or school of public affairs is typically a university program, institution, or professional school of public policy, public administration, political science, international relations, security studies, management, urban planning, urban studies, intelligence studies, global studies, emergency management, public affairs, nonprofit management, criminology, and the sociology of law.

Public policy schools typically train students in two streams. The more practical stream treats the master's degree as a terminal degree, which trains students to work as policy analysts or practitioners in governments, government relations, think tanks, business-to-government marketing/sales, and consulting firms. A more theoretical stream aims to train students who are aiming to go on to complete doctoral studies with the goal of becoming professors of public policy, political science in general, or researchers.

== Curriculum ==
Public policy schools offer a wide range of public policy degrees. At the undergraduate level, universities, especially research-intensive universities may offer a Bachelor of Arts or Bachelor of Science degree with majors or concentrations in public policy, public administration, political science, international relations, policy studies or any other differently named but content-wise identical major or concentration. These undergraduate degrees are typically offered by a university's public administration or political science faculties whether it be part of a public policy school or a college of arts and sciences. Well known Master's degrees within this academic field include the Master of Public Policy (MPP), the Master of Public Administration (MPA), the Master of Public Affairs (MPAff), the Master of Public Service (MPS), the Master of Urban Planning (MUP), the Master of International Affairs (MIA), and Master of Arts or Master of Sciences in International Relations, Political Science, or International Security, or other sub-fields of political science. Schools with an international and interdisciplinary focus may award a Master of Arts degree in International Policy Studies. Some schools teaching nonprofit studies as its own field of study may offer a Master of Nonprofit Organizations or a Master of Public Administration in Nonprofit Management. In the field of criminology and the sociology of law, some offer bachelor's, master's, and doctoral degrees in criminology, law and society, administration of justice, legal studies, and criminal justice. Some schools also offer Executive master's degrees in the same topics for mid-career individuals and a Master of Professional Studies degree to signify that the education takes an applied rather than theoretical approach. Other universities teach urban planning and confer professional degrees such as the Master of Urban Planning (M.U.P.), Master of City Planning (M.C.P.), Master of Regional Planning (M.R.P.), Master of Urban and Regional Planning (M.U.R.P.) to qualify students and alumni to work as urban planners.

Doctoral degrees include PhDs in public policy, policy studies and public administration, or in political science with a concentration in any of the aforementioned sub-fields, as well as the Doctor of Public Administration (DPA). Some schools offer relatively short-duration certificate programs aimed at working policy analysts, government managers, public executives, or any other working professional who needs this education regardless of employment sector.

In North America, students typically pursue a graduate public policy degree after having completed an undergraduate degree, either in a public administration or political science field. Some programs admit students with any undergraduate degree; however, students without a background in public administration or political science may be required to do qualifying courses in these areas. Some universities allow students to complete both degrees concurrently. North American public policy programs are generally located in an autonomous graduate or professional school within a larger university, while at others combine both graduate and undergraduate programs into a single semi-autonomous constituent college.

While degrees in Public Policy and Public Administration at most universities are generally taught at the graduate level (master's and PhD), some undergraduate degree program majors, concentrations, and minors either as standalone degrees or as concentrations within a degree in political science or international relations still exist, especially at research universities and professional schools where research, graduate, and undergraduate faculty overlap and/or have close cooperation unlike liberal arts colleges (particularly liberal arts colleges in the United States) that focus on the more theoretical and philosophical sides of political science rather than the applied and administrative side of political science.

== Notable institutions ==
=== North America ===
Canada

- Balsillie School of International Affairs, a joint initiative between CIGI, University of Waterloo, and Wilfrid Laurier University, Waterloo, Ontario
- Master of Public Service at University of Waterloo, Waterloo, Ontario
- Munk School of Global Affairs and Public Policy at the University of Toronto, Toronto, Ontario
- Norman Paterson School of International Affairs at Carleton University, Ottawa, Ontario
- University of Ottawa's Graduate School of Public and International Affairs, Ottawa, Ontario
- The School of Public Policy and Global Affairs at University of British Columbia, Vancouver, British Columbia
- The Max Bell School of Public Policy at McGill University, Montréal, Quebec
- The School of Policy Studies at Queen's University, Kingston, Ontario
- The School of Public Policy at the University of Calgary, Calgary, Alberta
- School of Public Administration at Dalhousie University, Halifax, Nova Scotia
- Master in Public Policy and Public Administration (MPPPA), Department of Political Science at Concordia University, Montréal, Quebec
- Department of Political Science at the Université de Montréal, Montréal, Quebec
- Master of Public Affairs, Department of Political Science at Université Laval, Québec City, Quebec
- Ecole nationale d'administration publique at the Université du Québec, Québec City, Quebec
- Johnson-Shoyama Graduate School of Public Policy at the University of Saskatchewan and the University of Regina, Regina, Saskatchewan
- The Glendon School of Public and International Affairs at York University, Toronto, Ontario
- Department of Politics and Public Administration at Toronto Metropolitan University, Toronto, Ontario
- The School of Public Policy at Simon Fraser University, Vancouver, British Columbia
- The School of Public Administration at the University of Victoria, Victoria, British Columbia

United States

Public policy schools in the United States tackle policy analysis differently. The Harris School of Public Policy Studies at the University of Chicago has a more quantitative and economics approach to policy, the Heinz College at Carnegie Mellon uses computational and technology-driven methods, while the John F. Kennedy School of Government at Harvard University has a more political science and leadership based approach. The Indiana University School of Public and Environmental Affairs provides traditional public policy training with multidisciplinary concentrations available in the environmental sciences and nonprofit management. Moreover, the University of Illinois at Chicago offers public policy training that emphasizes the stages of decision-making in formulating policy (e.g. agenda setting), as well as the importance of framing effects and cognitive limits in policy formation.

Schools of public policy that have met professional standards of education and quality in the United States are accredited by the Network of Schools of Public Policy, Affairs, and Administration (NASPAA):

- The Carsey School of Public Policy at the University of New Hampshire
- Johns Hopkins Institute for Policy Studies and Graduate Program in Public Management at Johns Hopkins University
- Trachtenberg School of Public Policy and Public Administration at The George Washington University
- Princeton School of Public and International Affairs at Princeton University
- McCourt School of Public Policy at Georgetown University
- Ford Dorsey Master's in International Policy at Stanford University
- John F. Kennedy School of Government at Harvard University
- School of International and Public Affairs at Columbia University
- School of International Service and School of Public Affairs at American University
- Institute for Public Affairs at Cornell University
- Harris School of Public Policy Studies at the University of Chicago
- Goldman School of Public Policy at the University of California, Berkeley
- Luskin School of Public Affairs at the University of California, Los Angeles
- Robert F. Wagner Graduate School of Public Service at New York University
- Robert M. La Follette School of Public Affairs at the University of Wisconsin–Madison
- Gerald R. Ford School of Public Policy at the University of Michigan
- Harry S Truman School of Public Affairs at the University of Missouri
- Daniel J. Evans School of Public Affairs at the University of Washington
- Edward J. Bloustein School of Planning and Public Policy at Rutgers University
- UCR School of Public Policy at the University of California, Riverside
- Center for Public Administration and Policy at Virginia Tech
- Andrew Young School of Policy Studies at Georgia State University
- Fels Institute of Government at the University of Pennsylvania
- Frank Batten School of Leadership and Public Policy at the University of Virginia
- Schar School of Policy and Government at George Mason University
- H. John Heinz III College of Information Systems and Public Policy at Carnegie Mellon University
- Hubert H. Humphrey School of Public Affairs at the University of Minnesota
- Ivan Allen College of Liberal Arts at the Georgia Institute of Technology
- O'Neill School of Public and Environmental Affairs at Indiana University Bloomington
- John Glenn School of Public Affairs at Ohio State University
- Arkansas State University College of Liberal Arts and Communication
- Frederick S. Pardee RAND Graduate School at the RAND Corporation
- Lokey School of Business and Public Policy at Mills College
- Lyndon B. Johnson School of Public Affairs at the University of Texas at Austin
- Martin School of Public Policy and Administration at the University of Kentucky
- Master of Public Administration Program (UMPA) at the University of Miami
- Marxe School of Public and International Affairs at Baruch College
- Maxine Goodman Levin College of Urban Affairs at Cleveland State University
- Maxwell School of Citizenship and Public Affairs at Syracuse University
- Monterey Institute of International Studies at Middlebury College
- Rockefeller College of Public Affairs and Policy at the University at Albany, SUNY
- Sanford School of Public Policy at Duke University
- School of Public Policy at the University of Massachusetts Amherst
- Helms School of Government at Liberty University
- Sol Price School of Public Policy at the University of Southern California
- School of Public Policy at Oregon State University
- The Bush School of Government and Public Service at Texas A&M University
- Clinton School of Public Service at the University of Arkansas
- School of Public and International Affairs at the University of Georgia
- Department of Public Policy at the University of Maryland, Baltimore County
- School of Public Policy at the University of Maryland, College Park
- School of Public Policy at Pepperdine University
- University of Pittsburgh Graduate School of Public and International Affairs
- School of Public Policy and Urban Affairs at Northeastern University
- Baker School of Public Policy and Public Affairs at the University of Tennessee, Knoxville

Mexico

- Public Administration Division at Centro de Investigación y Docencia Económicas, Mexico City
- Instituto Tecnológico Autónomo de México, Mexico City
- Center for International Studies at El Colegio de México, Mexico City
- Universidad Nacional Autónoma de México, Mexico City
- National Institute of Public Administration, Mexico City
- School of Government and Public Transformation at the Instituto Tecnológico y de Estudios Superiores de Monterrey, campus Monterrey and Mexico City
- Department of Social Sciences and Politics at Universidad Iberoamericana, Mexico City

=== South America ===
Brazil

- FGV-EAESP, São Paulo
- FGV-EBAPE, Rio de Janeiro
- Professor Paulo Neves de Carvalho Government School, Belo Horizonte
- Insper, São Paulo

=== Europe ===
In Europe, the LUISS School of Government offers a multidisciplinary approach to public policy combining economics, political science, new public management, and policy analysis, while the French institute of political studies Sciences Po complements these core disciplines with organizational sociology, human security, political economy, and leadership.

The European Commission through its Erasmus Mundus Programme has funded the Erasmus Mundus Master Program in Public Policy since 2007. This program brings together four leading policy-oriented schools in Eurorpe: The IBEI (Spain), Central European University (Hungary), the International Institute of Social Studies of the Erasmus University Rotterdam (The Netherlands) and the Department of Politics at the University of York (United Kingdom).

Czech Republic

- Department of Public and Social Policy at Charles University in Prague

France

- Institut d'études politiques de Paris or Sciences Po Paris
- Institut d'études politiques de Strasbourg at Université de Strasbourg
- Institut d'études politiques de Bordeaux
- Institut d'études politiques de Toulouse
- Institut d'études politiques de Grenoble
- Institut d'études politiques de Lyon
- Institut d'études politiques d'Aix-en-Provence
- Institut d'études politiques de Lille
- Institut d'études politiques de Rennes
- Institut d'études politiques de Saint-Germain-en-Laye

Germany

- Hertie School of Governance, Berlin
- Department of Politics and Administration at University of Konstanz
- Department of Political and Social Science at Freie Universität Berlin
- Willy Brandt School of Public Policy, University of Erfurt
- German University of Administrative Sciences, Speyer
- NRW School of Governance, Duisburg
- Bavarian School of Public Policy, Munich
- Department of Politics, Administration & International Relations, Zeppelin University

Hungary

- School of Public Policy at the Central European University, Budapest
- Department of Public Policy and Management, Corvinus University of Budapest

Italy;

- Luiss School of Government at Libera Università Internazionale degli Studi Sociali Guido Carli, Rome

Kazakhstan

- Graduate School of Public Policy, at Nazarbayev University, Nur-Sultan

Netherlands

- The Maastricht Graduate School of Governance at Maastricht University and the United Nations University
- The International Institute of Social Studies at the Erasmus University Rotterdam

United Kingdom

- Blavatnik School of Government and Department of Social Policy and Intervention, University of Oxford
- Institute of Public Affairs at The London School of Economics and Political Science
- Department of Politics and International Studies at the University of Cambridge
- Department of Politics and International Studies at the University of Warwick
- School of Public Policy at the University College London
- Faculty of Social Science & Public Policy at King's College London, University of London
- School for Policy Studies at the University of Bristol
- School of Government and International Affairs at Durham University
- University of Edinburgh Academy of Government at the University of Edinburgh
- The Centre for Financial and Management Studies, SOAS, University of London
- School of Government and Public Policy at the University of Strathclyde
- Department of Politics at the University of York

Russia

- The Russian Presidential Academy of National Economy and Public Administration under the President of the Russian Federation

Spain

- The IE School of Global and Public Affairs at IE University

Switzerland

- The Albert Einstein School of Public Policy at ETH Zurich

=== Asia ===
Brunei Darussalam

- Institute of Policy Studies at University of Brunei Darussalam

China

- School of Government at Peking University
- School of Public Policy and Management at Tsinghua University

India

- Jindal School of Government and Public Policy, Sonipat.
- Tata Institute of Social Sciences, Hyderabad.
- National Law School of India University, Bangalore
- School of International Relations and Politics, Mahatma Gandhi University
- Takshashila Institution, Bangalore, Karnataka
- Management Development Institute, Gurugram
- Ashank Desai Centre for Policy Studies, IIT Bombay
- Indian School of Business, Hyderabad
- School of Policy & Governance, Azim Premji University, Bangalore
- Indian Institute of Public Administration, New Delhi
- Indian Institutes of Management
- Indian Institute of Management Ahmedabad
- Indian Institute of Management Bangalore
- Indian Institute of Management Calcutta
- School of Public Policy and Governance, MDI Gurgaon
- Institute of Rural Management Anand
- National Law School of India University, Bangalore
- School of Public Policy and Governance, Tata Institute of Social Sciences, Hyderabad
- School of Government and Public Affairs, Xavier University, Bhubaneswar
- St. Xavier's College, Mumbai
- TERI University, New Delhi
- Faculty of planning, CEPT University, Ahmedabad
- Central University of Rajasthan, Department of Public Policy, Law and Governance
- Central University of Jammu, Department of Public Policy and Public Administration
- Sri Sri University, Department of Good Governance and Public Policy, Cuttack, Odisha
- University of Pertroleum and Energy Studies, Dehradun
- FMS-WISDOM, Banasthali Vidyapith, Rajasthan

Hong Kong

- Department of Politics and Public Administration, Faculty of Social Science, The University of Hong Kong, Hong Kong

Israel

- Federmann School of Public Policy and Government, Hebrew University of Jerusalem

Japan

- National Graduate Institute for Policy Studies (GRIPS), Tokyo
- Graduate School of Public Policy, University of Tokyo, Tokyo
- School of International and Public Policy, Hitotsubashi University, Tokyo
- Graduate School of Media and Governance, Keio University, Tokyo
- Graduate School of Public Management, Waseda University, Tokyo
- Graduate School of Public Policy, Chuo University, Tokyo
- Graduate School of Public Policy and Social Governance, Hosei University, Tokyo
- Graduate School of Governance Studies, Meiji University, Tokyo
- School of Government, Kyoto University, Kyoto
- Graduate School of Public Policy, Kyoto Prefectural University, Kyoto
- Graduate School of Policy and Management, Doshisha University, Kyoto
- Graduate School of Policy Science, Ritsumeikan University, Kyoto
- The Osaka School of International Public Policy, Osaka University, Osaka
- Graduate School of Governance, Kansai University, Osaka
- School and Graduate School of Public Studies, Kwansei Gakuin University, Hyōgo Prefecture
- Hokkaido University Public Policy School, Sapporo
- School of Public Policy, Tohoku University, Sendai
- Graduate School of Policy Studies, Chiba University of Commerce, Chiba
- Graduate School of Policy Studies, Iwate Prefectural University, Iwate

Nepal

- Tribhuvan University

Philippines

- Ateneo School of Government at the Ateneo de Manila University
- National College of Public Administration and Governance at University of the Philippines Diliman

Qatar

- Department of Public Policy in Islam at Qatar Faculty of Islamic Studies, Hamad Bin Khalifa University

Singapore

- Lee Kuan Yew School of Public Policy at the National University of Singapore
- S. Rajaratnam School of International Studies at Nanyang Technological University

South Korea

- KDI School of Public Policy and Management

Taiwan

- College of Social Sciences and College of International Affairs at National Chengchi University
- Department of Public Administration at NDHU College of Humanities and Social Sciences
- Department of Indigenous Development and Social Work at NDHU College of Indigenous Studies

Thailand

- National Institute of Development Administration (NIDA)
- The School of Public Policy at Chiang Mai University

United Arab Emirates

- Dubai School of Government, Dubai

Vietnam

- Fulbright School of Public Policy and Management at the Fulbright University Vietnam

=== Africa ===
Egypt

- School of Global Affairs & Public Policy at the American University in Cairo

South Africa

- The School of Government at the University of the Western Cape

=== Oceania ===
Australia

- Australia and New Zealand School of Government (ANZSOG)
- Australian Public Policy Institute
- Canberra School of Government, University of Canberra
- Crawford School of Public Policy, Australian National University
- John Curtin Institute of Public Policy, Curtin University
- Sir Walter Murdoch School of Public Policy and International Affairs, Murdoch University
- University of Queensland
- University of Tasmania

== See also ==
- List of public administration schools
- List of schools of international relations
