= Public policy degrees =

Public policy degrees, public administration degrees and public affairs degrees are graduate master's and PhD level professional degrees or undergraduate bachelor's degree level academic majors, concentrations, and academic minors at research-intensive universities, offered by public policy schools. These include but are not limited to:

== Doctoral Degrees ==
- PhD in Public Policy
- PhD in Policy Studies
- PhD in Policy Analysis
- PhD in Public Administration
- PhD in Political Economy and Government
- PhD in Social Policy
- Doctor of Public Administration (DPA)
- PhD in Political Science.

== Master's Degrees ==
- Master of Public Affairs (M.P.A.)
- Master of Public Policy (M.P.P.)
- Master of Public Administration (M.P.A. or M.P.Adm.)
- Master of Public Policy and Administration (M.P.P.A.)
- Master of Public Service (M.P.S.)
- Master of Arts in Law and Diplomacy (M.A.L.D.)
- Master of Arts in International Policy Studies (M.A.I.P.S.)
- Master of Public Management (M.P.M.)
- Master of Nonprofit Organizations (M.N.O. or M.N.P.O.) or Master of Nonprofit Management (M.N.M)
- Master of Governmental Administration (M.G.A.)
- Master of Urban Planning (M.U.P.)
- Master of City Planning (M.C.P.)
- Master of Regional Planning (M.R.P.)
- Master of Urban and Regional Planning (M.U.R.P.)
- Master of International Affairs (M.I.A.)
- Master of Global Policy Studies (M.G.P.S.)
- Master of Arts, Master of Science, Graduate Certificates or concentrations within the aforementioned master's and doctoral degrees
  - Political Science
  - International Affairs
  - Urban Studies
  - International Security
  - National Security
  - Security Studies
  - Homeland Security and Emergency management
  - Public Service

== Bachelor's Degrees ==
Bachelor of Arts or Bachelor of Science - Academic majors

- Political Science and Government
- Public Administration
- International Affairs
- Urban Studies
- Security Studies

Academic concentrations and Academic minors

- Homeland Security
- Urban Studies
- Intelligence Studies and Intelligence Analysis
- Public Policy and Administration / Public Policy and Management
- Political Communication
- Economic Analysis for Public Policy and Administration
- Political Analysis
- International Political Economy
- Political Philosophy
- Political Communication
