= Andrew Young School of Policy Studies =

School of public policy at Georgia State University

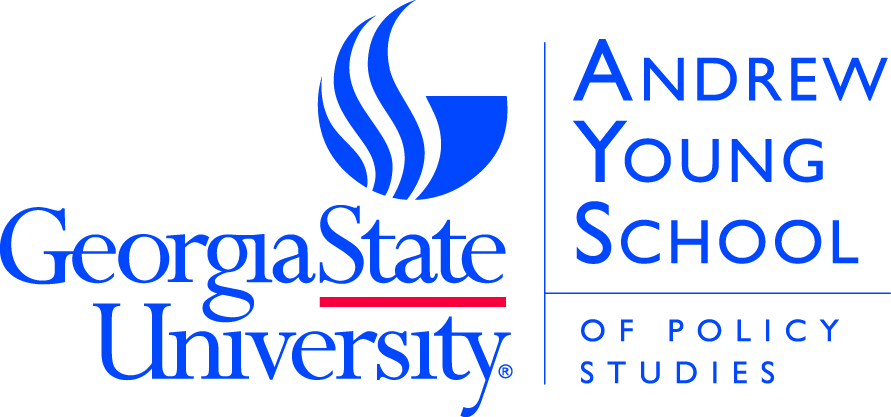
- Type: Public school of public policy
- Established: July 1996
- Parent institution: Georgia State University
- Dean: Thomas Vicino
- Academic staff: 74 full-time
- Undergraduates: 1,360
- Postgraduates: 497
- Location: 55 Park Place NE, Atlanta, GA, 30303, United States; 33.7560°N 84.3872°W
- Campus: Urban
- Website: aysps.gsu.edu

The Andrew Young School of Policy Studies is a school of public policy and one of twelve constitute schools of Georgia State University.

Founded in 1996 as the School of Policy Studies, it was renamed in 1999 for civil rights leader Andrew Young. The school offers undergraduate, master's, and doctoral degrees, as well as graduate certificate programs, through its Departments of Criminal Justice & Criminology, Economics, and Public Management & Policy, the School of Social Work, and the Urban Studies Institute. Its research centers include the Georgia Health Policy Center, the Georgia Policy Labs, and the Experimental Economics Center, along with the Public Finance Research Cluster, which encompasses the Fiscal Research Center, Center for State and Local Finance, and International Center for Public Policy.

== History ==
=== Origins and founding ===
Georgia State University's involvement in public administration education began in 1972 with the establishment of the Master of Governmental Administration degree, one of the first programs in Georgia dedicated to training professionals for public service and governmental leadership. In 1988, Michael H. Mescon, then dean of the College of Business Administration, created the Policy Research Center to strengthen connections between academic research and public policy. Mescon envisioned the center as a bridge between the private and public sectors, emphasizing the interdependence of economic and policy success.

By the mid-1990s, the university had created several specialized research units that would later form the backbone of the policy school. In 1995, the Fiscal Research Program was established to conduct applied research in taxation and public finance; it was later renamed the Fiscal Research Center. That same year, Georgia State launched the Georgia Health Policy Center as the research arm of the Georgia Coalition for Health, representing perspectives from the public sector, health care providers, business, and community stakeholders. Other initiatives from the early to mid-1990s included the Environmental Policy Program, the Applied Research Center (home of the Georgia State Poll), and the International Studies Program, which later evolved into the International Center for Public Policy.

In July 1996, Georgia State University consolidated its growing portfolio of policy research centers with the Departments of Economics and Public Administration and Urban Studies to create the School of Policy Studies. Roy W. Bahl, a public finance economist and longtime Georgia State faculty member, was appointed as the school's founding dean. Under his leadership, the new school emphasized the integration of academic research with applied policy work, expanding collaborations with state and local governments and building international partnerships focused on fiscal reform and public-sector capacity.

=== Naming and expansion ===
In 1999, the School of Policy Studies was renamed the Andrew Young School of Policy Studies in honor of Andrew Young, who served as U.S. Ambassador to the United Nations from 1977 to 1979 and as Mayor of Atlanta from 1982 to 1990. The renaming recognized Young's record of public service and his connection to Atlanta's civic and governmental leadership.

Over the following two decades, the school broadened its research and instructional activities. The Experimental Economics Center was established in 2006 under economist James C. Cox. In 2011, the Department of Criminal Justice and Criminology and the School of Social Work were incorporated into the Andrew Young School, extending its disciplinary scope to include programs in criminal justice, criminology, and social work. In 2018, the Georgia Policy Labs was established within the school to conduct applied research in partnership with public agencies. That same year, the Fiscal Research Center, Center for State and Local Finance, and International Center for Public Policy were organized as the Public Finance Research Cluster to coordinate research on taxation, budgeting, and public-sector finance.

== Academics ==
The Andrew Young School of Policy Studies offers nine undergraduate degree programs, (Note: The nine undergraduate degree programs are: Bachelor of Social Work; B.A. in Economics; B.A. in International Economics and Modern Languages; B.B.A. in Business Economics; B.I.S. in Philosophy, Politics, and Economics; B.I.S. in Social Entrepreneurship; B.S. in Criminal Justice; B.S. in Economics; B.S. in Public Policy) 12 master's programs, (Note: The 12 master's programs are: Master of Public Administration; Master of Public Administration/J.D.; Master of Public Policy; Master of Public Policy/J.D.; M.A. in Economics; M.I.S. in Criminal Justice Administration; M.I.S. in Philosophy, Politics, and Economics; M.I.S. in Urban Studies; M.S. in Criminal Justice; M.S.W. in Community Practice & Leadership; M.S.W. in Mental Health & Wellness; Advanced Standing M.S.W.) and four doctoral programs, (Note: The four doctoral programs are: Ph.D. in Criminal Justice & Criminology; Ph.D. in Economics; Ph.D. in Public Policy; Ph.D. in Urban Studies) along with several graduate certificate programs. (Note: The six graduate certificate programs are: Computational Social Science; Nonprofit Management and Social Enterprise; Planning and Economic Development; Policy Analytics; Public Management and Leadership; Sport Social Work) Areas of study include economics, public policy, public administration, criminal justice, criminology, social work, and urban studies. It also offers a joint Ph.D. in Public Policy in collaboration with the Georgia Institute of Technology.

=== Research centers ===
The school hosts several research centers and institutes that support applied scholarship and public engagement. Major centers include the Georgia Health Policy Center, the Georgia Policy Labs, and the Experimental Economics Center. The school also houses the Public Finance Research Cluster, which comprises the Fiscal Research Center, Center for State and Local Finance, and International Center for Public Policy. These centers conduct research on topics such as public finance, health policy, education, social services, and economic development at the local, state, national, and international levels.

=== Admissions ===
Admissions to undergraduate programs occur through Georgia State University's general undergraduate admissions process, as students select an Andrew Young School major after enrollment. For graduate programs, the school received 964 applications for degree-seeking students for Fall 2023, of which 590 were accepted, representing an acceptance rate of 61.2%. Of those admitted, 156 enrolled, yielding an enrollment rate of 26.4%. The average GRE percentiles for enrolled graduate students were 60th percentile verbal and 58th percentile quantitative.

=== Rankings ===
In the 2026 U.S. News & World Report Best Graduate Schools rankings for public affairs programs, the Andrew Young School was ranked 14th nationally. Its specialty areas were ranked 1st in urban policy, 4th in public finance and budgeting, 7th in nonprofit management, 7th in local government management, 14th in public management and leadership, and 20th in public policy analysis. In related disciplines, criminology was ranked 18th, social work 51st, and economics 61st.

=== Faculty and student body ===
The Andrew Young School employs 74 full-time teaching faculty, including economists, political scientists, criminologists, and social work scholars. Of these, 48 (65%) are tenured, 9 (12%) are tenure-track, and 17 (23%) are non-tenure-track. Faculty regularly collaborate with state and local governments, nonprofit organizations, and international agencies through the school's research centers and applied policy projects.

As of Fall 2023, the school enrolled 1,360 undergraduate and 497 graduate students across its academic programs. Students represent diverse academic and professional backgrounds and often participate in internships or applied research opportunities with public and nonprofit organizations in the Atlanta metropolitan area.
