= IDHEAP =

Public administration school of the University of Lausanne

Coordinates: 46.5264°N 6.5779°E

Since 2014, the Swiss Graduate School of Public Administration is part of the University of Lausanne.

Former logo of the IDHEAP.

The Swiss Graduate School of Public Administration (French: Institut des hautes études en administration publique, IDHEAP) is a Swiss graduate school of public administration. In 2014, the independent foundation was integrated into the University of Lausanne.

The school teaches graduate and post-graduate courses for public sector executives and (more recently) students wishing to take up public service. It also provides professional training for members of administrative bodies. It receives support from the Swiss Confederation under the Swiss Federal Law on University Funding. IDHEAP is located on the campus of the University of Lausanne.

Beyond its teaching activities, IDHEAP also carries out research and counselling missions regarding the public sector. IDHEAP has been designated as the leading institution of the Swiss Public Administration Network, which aims to foster cooperation between the universities of Bern, Lausanne and Lugano, to boost research works and doctoral studies in public administration.

== History ==
IDHEAP was created (under the form of a "Foundation for a graduate school in public administration") by Enrico Bignami, former delegate of the Board of Directors of Nestlé and creator of IMEDE (now the International Institute for Management Development), who wished to establish a Swiss MBA for the public sector. The other founders were the canton of Vaud, the University of Lausanne, the École Polytechnique Fédérale de Lausanne and the Association of Friends of IDHEAP.

- 1982: Convention with the University of Lausanne.
- 1983: Opening of the Research Centre. Signature of a Convention with the Swiss Federal Personnel Office.
- 1984: Short courses for the State of Vaud launched.
- 1987: Recognition by the Swiss Confederation.
- 1990: Co-operation agreement with the European Institute of Public Administration in Maastricht.
- 1994: Creation of the Master of Public Administration. Launch of the executive training programs for managers.
- 1995: Introduction of the joint IDHEAP–University of Lausanne doctorate.
- 2000: The service contract with the canton of Vaud and the Confederation takes effect.
- 2001: Co-operation agreement with the National School of Public Administration in Quebec.
- 2003: Co-operation convention with the University of Bern, Center of Competence in Public Management.
- 2007: IDHEAP designated as the leading institution of the Swiss Public Administration Network.
- 2009-2010: Opening of a new building on the Lausanne university campus.
- 1 January 2014, the Swiss Graduate School of Public Administration (IDHEAP) was integrated into the University of Lausanne.

== Accreditation ==
The institute is accredited by the Swiss Confederation (via OAQ), and the MPA is accredited by the European Association for Public Administration Accreditation.

== Programmes ==
The programmes of the IDHEAP include:

- Doctorate in Public Administration
- Master of Public Administration (MPA), a Master of Advanced Studies designed for experienced public sector executives, which may be taken full-time (1 year) or part-time (2 or 3 years)
- Master of Arts in Public Management and Policy (the PMP Master)
- The DEAP: a multi-disciplinary full-time course for executives, based on projects that the participants bring with them from their respective areas.
- Short executive programs tailored to individual needs, for executives in the public and para-public sectors
- Master of Advanced Studies, a Diploma of Advanced Studies and a Certificate of Advanced Studies in Management of Vocational Training Institutions and Education Policy, which was created in partnership with the University of Geneva, the Swiss Federal Institute for Vocational Education and Training and the State of Vaud High Pedagogical School.

=== Master of Public Administration (MPA) programme ===
The MPA program is a 90 ECTS executive, flexible length and multidisciplinary program (Master of Advanced Studies), designed for public sector managers or would-be managers. It is also open to anyone wishing to pursue a career in an organization whose activities involve working with the public sector.

The curriculum includes a foundation course (6 core modules of 6 days –one day a week during the academic year), 3 course options of 12 days, chosen among a list of 18 elective courses and an approximately 100 pages thesis covering an original and in-depth research project carried out from an interdisciplinary perspective and supervised by a professor at IDHEAP and an external expert.

Teaching includes group works (both presential and online), simulations, case studies (which may require students to work on real mandates and counselling missions carried out by the Institute) and research works.

The IDHEAP courses are delivered in French (although an international Executive MPA will soon be offered in English). The two other working languages are German and English. Both a student's trimester’s work and the dissertation can be written in French, German, English or Italian.

The average age of a graduate is 37, with a 66/34 split of men/women. 80 percent of graduates already have a university degree, most of them in political sciences, arts, economics, and law.

== Research ==
The IDHEAP teaching and research units participate in research projects financed by the Swiss National Science Foundation and R&D financed by the Commission for Technology and Innovation or the European Union four-year Information Society Technologies framework programs. Some research receives support from programs such as the Swiss Virtual Campus, the Interreg fund (European Cross-border Cooperation) or COST – European Cooperation in the Field of Scientific and Technical Research. Part of the research work carried out at IDHEAP is financed by consulting or experts’ fees.

33 research projects are currently under way at the school. Recent examples include:

- BADAC (http://www.badac.ch/), a Database of the Swiss States and Cities, funded by the Conference of Cantonal Chancellors
- Conditions for a joint representation of the scope for public action on a local level, funded by the Swiss National Science Foundation
- eGOV (integrated platform for an online, one-stop government), 5th IST (Information Society Technologies) framework program, for the European Union
- Modelling transport in Switzerland, for the Swiss Federal Statistical Office
- MOTOWN – Workey (a workflow designer and builder), for the Commission for Technology and Innovation
- Income and public spending and its impact on budgetary balance and econometric modelling, funded by the Swiss National Science Foundation
- Institutional regimes for urban resources, IRIS project (integration, regulation and social innovations) for the Lake Geneva triangle
- Sports Organisation Management Interactive Teaching (or SOMIT), funded by Swiss virtual campus
- Actors’ strategies regarding ongoing training, funded by the Swiss National Science Foundation (National Research Project 43)
- The Swiss Decision Making System in the Era of Globalization, for the Swiss National Science Foundation (Priority Program “Switzerland Tomorrow”).

IDHEAP publishes a full list of research projects on its website, at Institut de hautes études en administration publique.

Five new research projects were awarded to IDHEAP in 2007 by the Swiss National Fund for Research. In 2007, three doctorates of Public Administration were awarded by the University of Lausanne on the recommendation of IDHEAP.

Also in 2007, the university's Prof. Giuliano Bonoli was awarded the Latsis prize by the Swiss National Research Fund for his comparative research works on social policies.

== Mandates and counselling missions ==
IDHEAP carried out 40 mandates in 2007: these were benchmarking missions, fusion of small towns and administrations, fiscal optimization, efficiency evaluations, organizational audit, satisfaction surveys, marketing audit, and organizational reengineering. Among the main clients, were the Principality of Liechtenstein, the Organisation internationale de la Francophonie, the Swiss Parliament, the Swiss Conference of Universities, the Swiss Federal Office of Culture, the Swiss Federal Office for Migration, the Swiss Federal Office of Social Insurance, the Swiss Federal Office for Professional Education and Technology, the Swiss cantons of Bern, Fribourg, Neuchâtel, Valais, Vaud, the cities of Bern, Geneva, Lausanne, and Neuchâtel, The Institute for Research and Debate on Governance, The Lausanne Olympic Capital association and BEDAG SA.

== Exchange and partnership agreements ==
IDHEAP has exchange and partnership agreements with the following:

- Foreign universities:
  - The Faculty of Economic, social and political sciences of the Université catholique de Louvain
  - Georgia State University, Andrew Young School of Policy Studies, United States
  - The German University of Administrative Science
  - The National School of Public Administration in Quebec
  - The Portuguese National School of Administration
  - The Sun Yat-sen University in Canton
- Swiss universities
  - The Center of Competence in Public Administration of the University of Bern
  - The University of Fribourg Institute for the Management of Non Profit Organizations (SOMIT program)
  - The University of Geneva (FORDIF program)
  - The University of Lausanne
  - The Università della Svizzera italiana (the Italian speaking university of Switzerland)
- Other Swiss higher education institutions
  - The Graduate Institute of International and Development Studies in Geneva
  - The State of Vaud High Pedagogical School (FORDIF program)
  - The Swiss Federal Institute of Technology in Lausanne
  - The Swiss Federal Institute for Vocational Education and Training (FORDIF program)

== See also ==
- List of public administration schools
- Public management
- University of Lausanne
- Lausanne campus
