= Georg von Schnurbein =

German scholar

Georg von Schnurbein (born 1977, Regen) is associate professor of foundation management at the University of Basel. He is also the founder of the Center for Philanthropy Studies (CEPS) at the university.

== Education ==
From 1998 to 2003 Schnurbein studied business administration at the Otto-Friedrich-Universität Bamberg, then at the University of Fribourg; and political science at the University of Bern. In 2007, he earned a PhD from the University of Fribourg, Switzerland, and in 2013 and completed his Habilitation at the Wirtschaftsuniversität Wien.

== Professional career ==
In 2008, aligned with the foundation of the Center for Philanthropy Studies (CEPS), Schnurbein was appointed to assistant professor of foundation management at the faculty of business and economics at the University of Basel. In 2014 he was appointed as associate professor and 2022 full professor for foundation management.

In 2025 he was elected as board member of the International Society for Third-Sector Research.

== Research Focus ==
Schnurbein publishes in the areas of Nonprofit Management, foundation management, measuring impact, charity monitoring, financing of non profit organisations, and of philanthropy in general.

Some of his publications include:

- "Benefits and Drivers of Nonprofit Revenue Concentration", in: Nonprofit and Voluntary Sector Quarterly, Vol. 46, Nr. 5, 2018, S. 922–943 (with Tizian Fritz)
- "Finanzierung und Wachstum von Nonprofit-Organisationen", in: Die Unternehmung, Jg. 71, Nr. 2, 2017, S. 147–164.
- Swiss Foundation Code 2015, Foundation Governance Bd. 11, Basel: Helbing Lichtenhahn, 2015 (together with Thomas Sprecher and Philipp Egger)
- Die Förderstiftung: Strategie – Führung – Management, Foundation Governance Bd. 7, 2. Aufl., Basel: Helbing Lichtenhahn, 2015 (with Karsten Timmer)
- "Organizational factors affecting volunteers: a literature review on volunteer coordination", in: Voluntas, available online, 2012 (with Sibylle Studer)

== Editor and Expert ==
Schnurbein is co-editor of the Swiss foundation report, published yearly, as well as the Swiss Foundation Code. He serves as member on committees of various scientific journals, like Nonprofit Management & Leadership, Voluntary Sector Review, as well as Global Perspectives on Philanthropy and Public Good Series.
