= ISTR =

ISTR may refer to:

- IstR RNA, a family of non-coding RNA
- The International Society for Third-Sector Research
