= Albert Wesley Johnson =

Canadian civil servant (1923–2010)

Albert Wesley Johnson CC
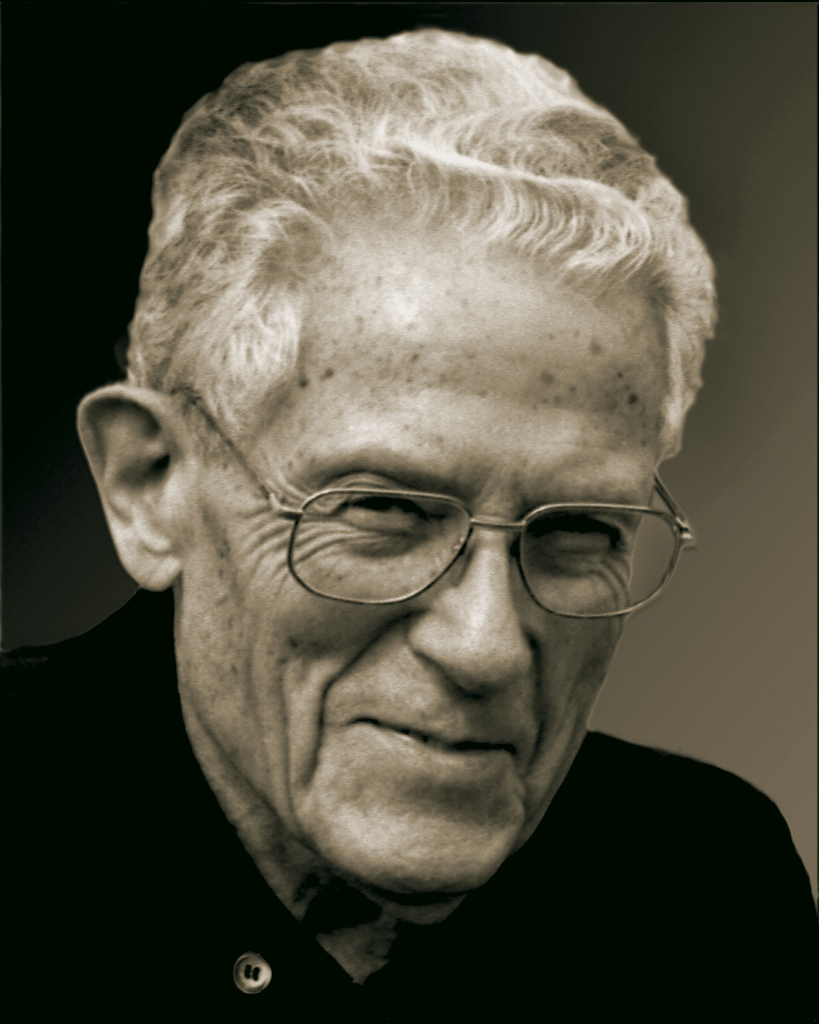
- Johnson in 2006
- Born: October 18, 1923; Insinger, Saskatchewan, Canada
- Died: November 9, 2010 (aged 87); Ottawa, Ontario, Canada
- Education: University of Toronto; Harvard University
- Occupations: Civil servant; academic
- Title: Deputy Treasurer of Saskatchewan (1952–1964); Secretary of the Treasury Board (1970–1973); Deputy Minister of National Health and Welfare (1973–1975); President of the Canadian Broadcasting Corporation (1975–1982)

Albert Wesley "Al" Johnson CC (October 18, 1923 – November 9, 2010) was a Canadian civil servant, a former president of the Canadian Broadcasting Corporation, a professor in the Department of Political Science at the University of Toronto, and an author.

Born in Insinger, Saskatchewan, Johnson received a Master of Public Administration (MPA) degree from the University of Toronto and an MPA and a PhD from Harvard University. He was deputy treasurer of Saskatchewan from 1952 until 1964. He was one of the key figures in the development of universal medicare, first in Saskatchewan in the governments of Premiers Tommy Douglas and Woodrow Lloyd and subsequently at the national level. In 1964, he became assistant deputy minister of finance for the federal government. From 1975 until 1982, he was president of the CBC. He subsequently taught at Queen's University and the University of Toronto.

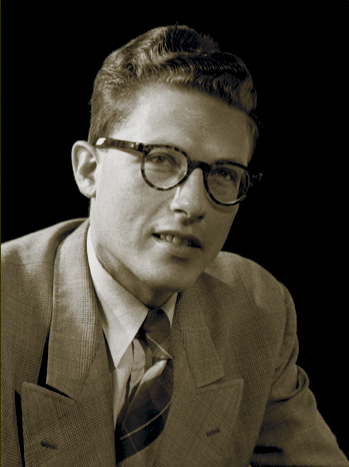
Albert Wesley Johnson ca. 1950, photograph by Myrtle E. Hardy.

In 1980, he was made an Officer of the Order of Canada and was promoted to Companion in 1996 in recognition of his "outstanding career as a public servant, university professor and consultant on post-secondary education, social policy and public management both nationally and internationally".

Johnson wrote the 2004 book Dream No Little Dreams, A Biography of the Douglas Government of Saskatchewan, 1944–1961 (ISBN 0-8020-8633-0) for which he was awarded the Canadian Political Science Association's Donald Smiley Prize in 2005.

After leaving the federal civil service he embarked on an international career:

- Special Advisor on National Provincial Fiscal Arrangements for the International Monetary Fund 1988
- Head of Mission on Administrative Modernization for the Canadian International Development Agency 1991
- Senior advisor to South Africa/Canada Program on Governance 1992
- Commissioner of South Africa's Presidential Review Commission on the Public Service 1996

Returning to Canada in 1999, Johnson became special chair in public policy to the Government of Saskatchewan.

Johnson died in Ottawa at age 87. He was survived by his wife, Ruth (née Hardy), whom he married in 1946, four children and one granddaughter.

== CBC years ==
During Johnson's years as President of the CBC, his chief goal was the Canadianization of the airwaves, by increasing the quality and quantity of Canadian radio and television programming.

== Awards and honours ==
- Vanier Medal 1976
- Companion of the Order of Canada 1997
- Canadian Political Science Association, Donald Smiley Prize 2005
- Arthur Kroeger College of Public Affairs, Award for Ethics in Public Affairs 2010
- The Johnson Shoyama Graduate School of Public Policy, established jointly between the University of Regina and the University of Saskatchewan in 2007, was named in honour of Johnson and Thomas Shoyama.

Government offices
| Preceded by Laurent Picard | President of the Canadian Broadcasting Corporation; 1975–1982 | Succeeded by Pierre Juneau |
