= Thomas Vicino =

American political scientist

Thomas J. Vicino
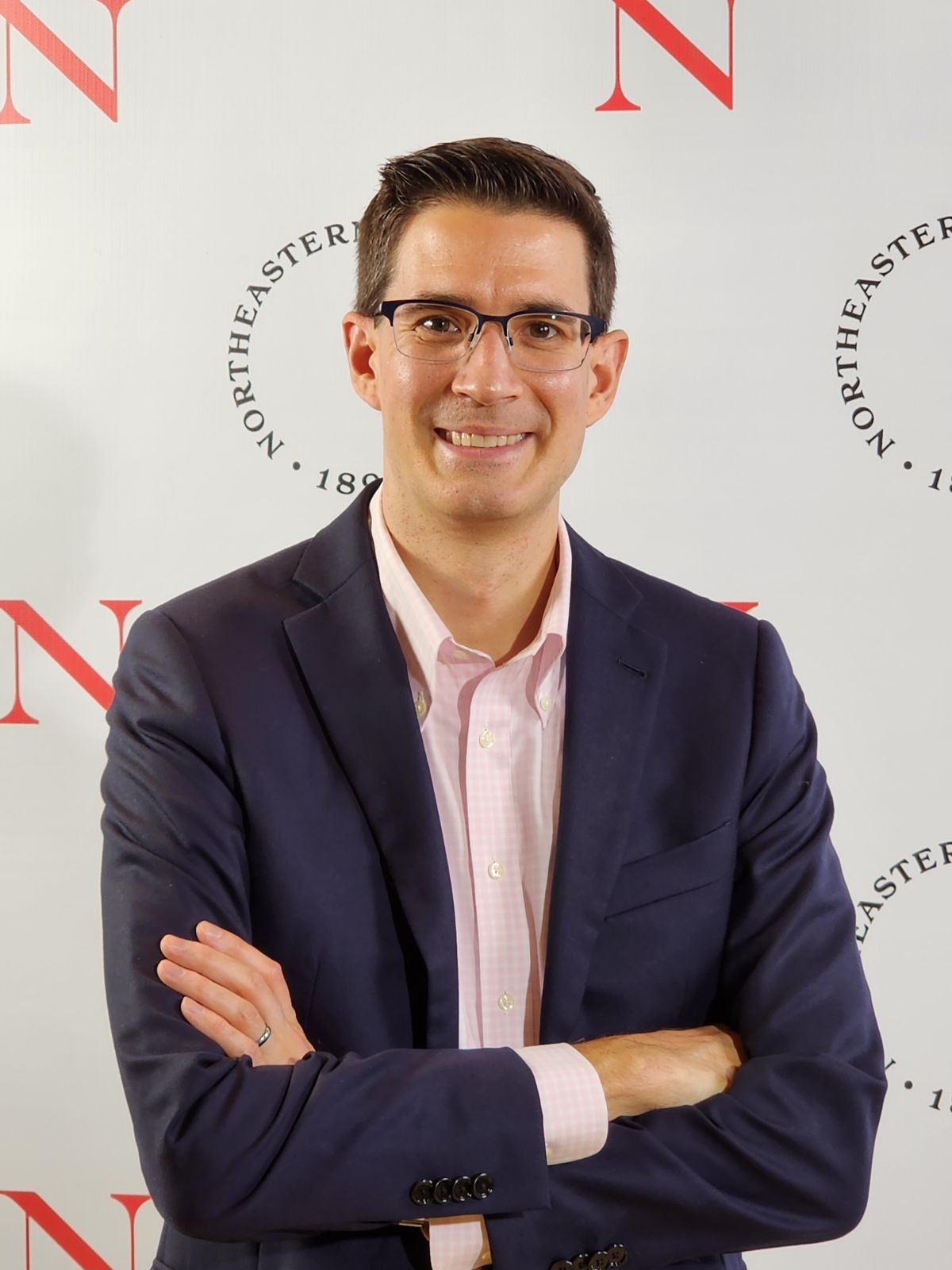

Academic background
- Education: University of Miami; University of Maryland, Baltimore County

Academic work
- Institutions: Georgia State University; Northeastern University; Wheaton College; University of Texas at Arlington

Thomas J. Vicino is an American academic and university administrator in the fields of political science and urban studies. Since March 2024, he has served as the eighth dean of the Andrew Young School of Policy Studies at Georgia State University.

== Early life and education ==
He earned a BSC degree in Communication Studies and Political Science at the University of Miami, where he was awarded the Frazier D. White Award for Excellence in Communication Studies. He later earned MPP and PhD degrees in public policy from the School of Public Policy at the University of Maryland, Baltimore County, where he worked as a Research Assistant at the Center for Urban Environmental Research and Education.

== Career ==
=== Administrative career ===
Vicino began his academic career in 2006 at the University of Texas at Arlington as an assistant professor in the School of Urban and Public Affairs, focusing on economic development and metropolitan governance. He later joined Wheaton College in Massachusetts as an assistant professor of political science in 2008. In 2009, he was appointed to the faculty at Northeastern University, where he advanced from assistant professor to full professor in the Department of Political Science and the School of Public Policy and Urban Affairs.

Over fifteen years at Northeastern University, Vicino held several leadership roles, including program director of the Master of Public Administration (2011–2017), associate chair and then chair of the Department of Political Science (2016–2019), and Associate Dean of the College of Social Sciences and Humanities (2019–2024).

In March 2024, Vicino was appointed the eighth dean of the Andrew Young School of Policy Studies at Georgia State University, where he is also appointed as a full professor in the Urban Studies Institute.

=== Scholarly career ===
Vicino’s scholarship centers on the political economy of metropolitan development, with a particular focus on how cities and suburbs evolve under shifting demographic, economic, and governance pressures.

His early empirical work on suburban Baltimore drew national attention for documenting the stagnation and socioeconomic decline occurring in many older suburbs, areas once considered stable middle-class communities but increasingly marked by aging housing stock, rising poverty, and demographic transformation. His analysis of Baltimore County’s suburbs highlighted patterns of population loss, racial change, infrastructure deterioration, and uneven school performance, underscoring the need for sustained public and private reinvestment in older suburban communities.

Across his research, Vicino introduced the concept of “new metropolitan realities,” rejecting the traditional model of a central city surrounded by a uniform suburban ring.

His work emphasized the heterogeneity of suburban places, the emergence of both prosperity and distress in the suburbs, and the consequences of decentralized urban growth for inequality, housing markets, and regional planning.

His analyses have been cited in reporting on issues of downtown revitalization, deindustrialization, demographic change, suburban sprawl, and international migration.

As a Fulbright U.S. Scholar in Brazil, he conducted research on urban governance, large-scale redevelopment, and the sociopolitical complexities of rapid urban transformation.

His research on Brazil examined the country’s economic volatility, urban development challenges surrounding events like the World Cup and the Olympics, and longer-term political and demographic trends shaping the country’s trajectory.

== Selected publications ==
=== Books ===
- Hanlon, Bernadette; Vicino, Thomas J. (2026). ''Global Migration: The Basics'' (2nd ed.). Routledge. ISBN 978-1-032-55506-5
- Hanlon, Bernadette; Short, John R.; Vicino, Thomas J. (2010). Cities and suburbs: new metropolitan realities in the US (1. publ ed.). London: Routledge. ISBN 978-0-415-49730-5.
- "Global Migration: The Basics". Routledge & CRC Press.
- Vicino, Thomas. "Suburban Crossroads". Bloomsbury.
- "Cities and Suburbs: New Metropolitan Realities in the US". Routledge & CRC Press.
- Vicino, Thomas J. (2008). Transforming race and class in suburbia: decline in Metropolitan Baltimore (1st ed.). New York: Palgrave Macmillan. ISBN 978-0-230-60545-9.

=== Articles ===
- Vicino, Thomas J.; Voigt, Robert H.; Kabir, Mahir; Michanie, Jonathan (2022-07-29). "Urban Crises and the Covid-19 Pandemic: An Analytical Framework for Metropolitan Resiliency". Urban Planning. 7 (3): 4–14. doi:10.17645/up.v7i3.5376. ISSN 2183-7635.
- Fahlberg, Anjuli; Vicino, Thomas J.; Fernandes, Ricardo; Potiguara, Viviane (2020-04-01). "Confronting chronic shocks: Social resilience in Rio de Janeiro's poor neighborhoods". Cities. 99 102623. doi:10.1016/j.cities.2020.102623. ISSN 0264-2751.
- Sarzynski, Andrea; Vicino, Thomas J. (2019). "Shrinking Suburbs: Analyzing the Decline of American Suburban Spaces". Sustainability. 11 (19): 5230. Bibcode:2019Sust...11.5230S. doi:10.3390/su11195230. ISSN 2071-1050.
- Fahlberg, Anjuli; Vicino, Thomas J. (2016-05-01). "Breaking the city: Militarization and segregation in Rio de Janeiro". Habitat International. Special Issue: Urban Segregation in Latin America. 54: 10–17. doi:10.1016/j.habitatint.2015.08.042. ISSN 0197-3975.
- Vicino, Thomas J. (2008-03-01). "The Quest to Confront Suburban Decline: Political Realities and Lessons". Urban Affairs Review. 43 (4): 553–581. doi:10.1177/1078087407309282. ISSN 1078-0874.
