= Graduate School of Public Policy, University of Tokyo =

Public policy school at the University of Tokyo

Coordinates: 35°42′48″N 139°45′44″E

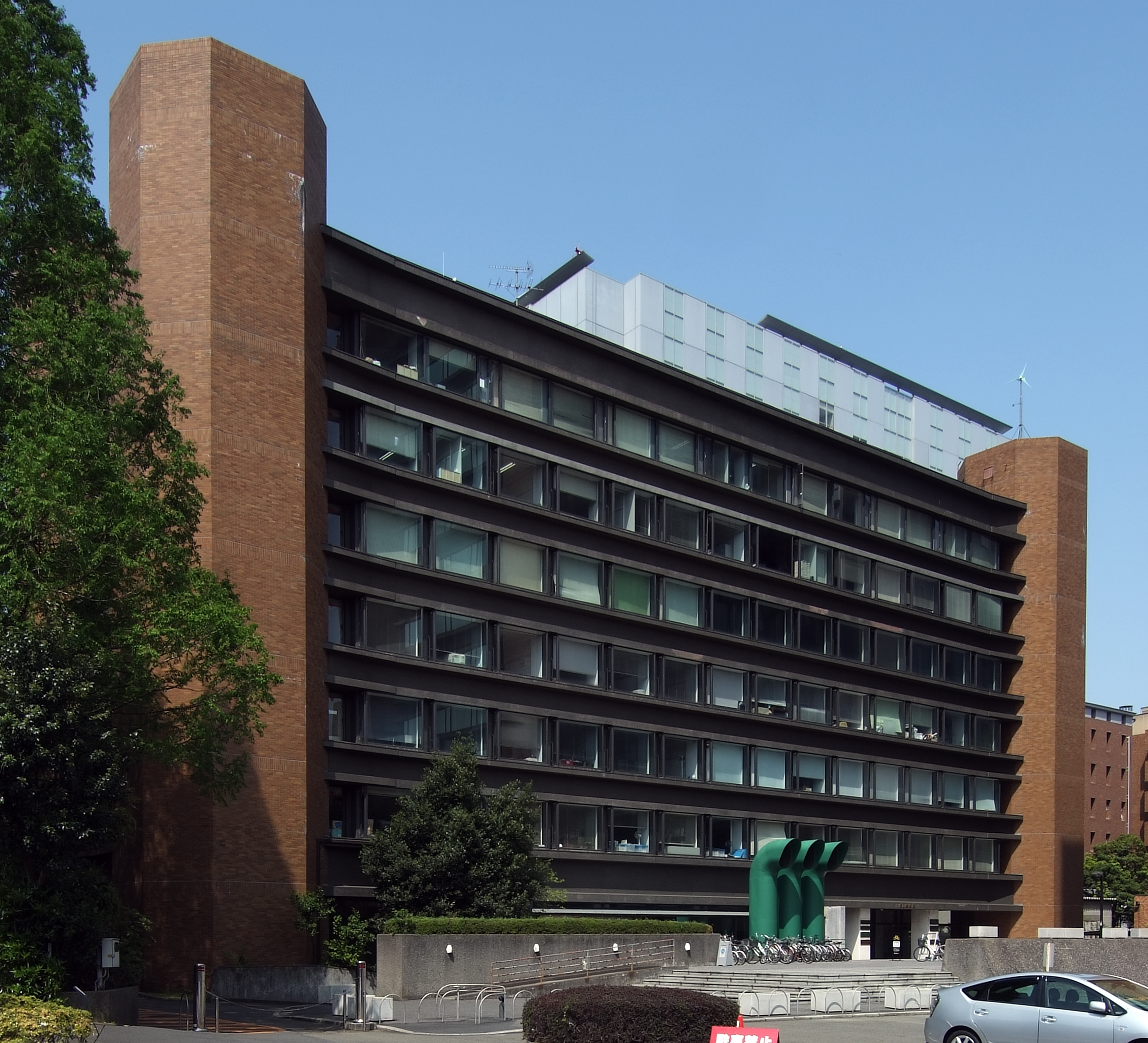
- Established: 2004
- Dean: Daiji Kawaguchi
- Students: 200 students (approx.)
- Location: Tokyo, Japan
- Colours: Light Blue
- Website: http://www.pp.u-tokyo.ac.jp/index.htm

The Graduate School of Public Policy (GraSPP) at the University of Tokyo was founded in 2004 and is one of the premier public policy schools in Asia. It is located on the University's Hongo campus in Bunkyo-ku, and consists of approximately 200 students. The current dean is Daiji Kawaguchi.

== Academics ==
The department consists of five separate plans of study, all leading to the Master of Public Policy degree. These five plans of study are Legal Policy (Japanese), Public Management (Japanese), International Public Policy (Japanese), Economic Policy (Japanese), and International Program (English). Many of the students in the International Program are sponsored by the World Bank, International Monetary Fund, or Asian Development Bank. Most students graduate in two years (four semesters), with most Japanese students matriculating in the spring (April) and most foreign students matriculating in the fall (October). Courses are categorized as either Basic Courses, Topics Courses, Case Studies, or Practical Training. The department is located on the Hongō campus and draws resources largely from two other faculties at the University of Tokyo: the Faculty of Economics and the Faculty of Law and Politics.

=== Master of Public Policy, International Program (MPP/IP) ===
The Graduate School of Public Policy offers a 2-year Master of Public Policy degree taught entirely in English.

== Exchange ==
The Graduate School of Public Policy is a member of the Global Public Policy Network, a partnership with the Columbia University School of International and Public Affairs (United States), FGV-EAESP (Brazil), Hertie School of Governance (Germany), Lee Kuan Yew School of Public Policy (Singapore), Institute of Public Affairs at the London School of Economics (United Kingdom), and Sciences Po, Paris (France).

Students can participate in exchange programs and/or double degree programs at these GPPN universities. In addition, the University of Tokyo is one of three participants in the Campus Asia Program, along with Peking University (China) and Seoul National University (South Korea).

== See also ==
- Public policy school
- National Graduate Institute for Policy Studies (GRIPS)
