= Thomas Shoyama =

Canadian public servant (1916–2006)

Thomas Kunito Shoyama
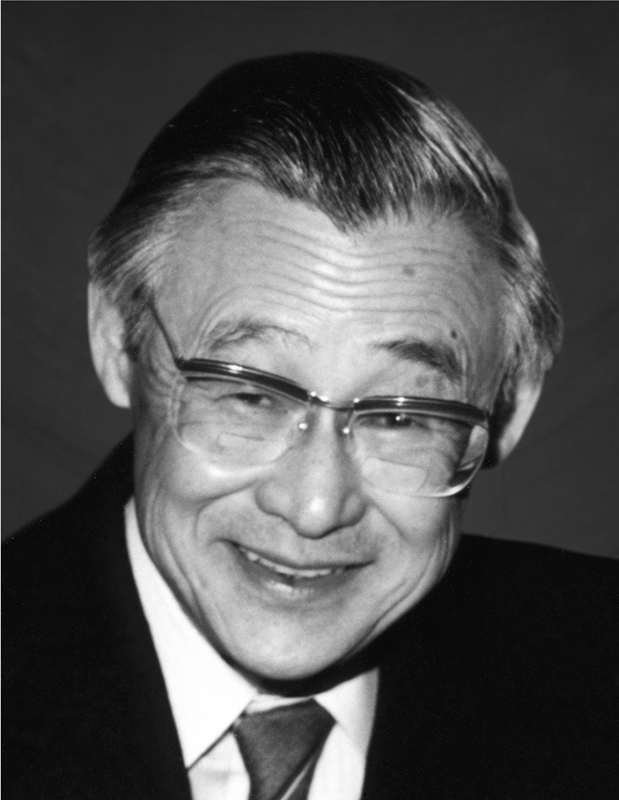
- Thomas K. Shoyama
- Born: September 24, 1916; Kamloops, British Columbia, Canada
- Died: December 22, 2006 (aged 90); Victoria, British Columbia, Canada
- Occupation: Public Servant

Thomas Kunito Shoyama (September 24, 1916 – December 22, 2006) was a prominent Canadian public servant who was instrumental in designing social services in Canada, especially Medicare.

== Early life ==
Shoyama was born in Kamloops, British Columbia, the son of a shop owner. He graduated from the University of British Columbia (UBC) in 1939 with a Bachelor of Arts in Economics and a Bachelor of Commerce (with Honours) degree. Rejected for training as a chartered accountant, Shoyama was hired as a reporter for the Vancouver-based Japanese-Canadian newspaper The New Canadian, serving as editor from 1939 to 1945.

== The New Canadian ==
The New Canadian was the sole Japanese-Canadian newspaper to be allowed to continue publishing after the Japanese attack on Pearl Harbor. In 1942, Shoyama was forced to move the offices of the 8-page weekly to an internment camp in Kaslo. As editor, Shoyama was a spokesman for the rights of the Japanese Canadian community and an important community leader during the wartime evacuation and resettlement. Shoyama continued to edit the newspaper until the spring of 1945 when he was commissioned as a lieutenant in the Canadian Army's Intelligence Corps.

== Public service ==
Shoyama left the military in 1946, taking a job in the Saskatchewan public service until 1964, first as a research economist, then as economic adviser to Premier Tommy Douglas and Premier Woodrow Lloyd, where he was one of the architects of the provincial medicare system.

Leaving the Saskatchewan public service shortly after the election of 1964, Shoyama became a Senior Research Economist with Economic Council of Canada. In 1968, he became Assistant Deputy Minister of Finance, and by 1975, after a term as Deputy Minister of Energy, Mines and Resources, was appointed Deputy Minister of Finance. During his final year in Ottawa, he served as Adviser to the Privy Council on the Constitution, and as Chairman of Atomic Energy of Canada Limited.

Retiring from the public service in 1979, Shoyama moved to Victoria, British Columbia and joined the School of Public Administration and the Department of Pacific and Asian Studies at the University of Victoria.

== Honours ==
Shoyama was made an Officer of the Order of Canada in 1978. In 1979, Mr. Shoyama was honoured with the Outstanding Achievement Award of the Public Service of Canada. The citation read, in part, “His strength of character, inexhaustible energy and absolute dedication to Canadian interests … brought him national and international recognition as an outstanding public servant of his country.”. In 1982, he received the Vanier Medal from the Institute of Public Administration of Canada in 1982. In 1992, the government of Japan awarded him the Order of the Sacred Treasure (gold and silver star) in recognition of his contributions to the Japanese Canadian community.

In 2007, the Department of Finance created the Thomas K. Shoyama Award to recognize outstanding achievement by a Finance employee. The department also established the Thomas Shoyama Annual Public Policy Lecture, which invites internationally recognized experts to speak on innovative ideas in public policy analysis.

In June 2007, the Johnson Shoyama Graduate School of Public Policy (JSGS) was established jointly between the University of Regina and the University of Saskatchewan. It was named in honour of Shoyama and Albert Wesley Johnson.

== See also ==
=== Archives ===
There is a Thomas K. Shoyama fonds at Library and Archives Canada. The archival reference number is R10881.
