= Graduate Program in Public Management =

Public policy school affiliated with Johns Hopkins University

The Johns Hopkins Public Management Program is a public policy school affiliated with Johns Hopkins University in Washington, D.C. MA in Public Management emphasizes the fundamentals of public management: financial management, policy analysis, tax and budget policy, and public administration. Courses may be taken at a full- or part-time pace. The program is led by Paul Weinstein, and offers a 12 course Master of Arts in Public Management.

The program is a member of the Network of Schools of Public Policy, Affairs, and Administration (NASPAA). The program is included in U.S. News & World Report list of top Public Affairs schools
