= UMBC School of Public Policy =

Graduate program at the University of Maryland, Baltimore County

Coordinates: 39.25380°N 76.71425°W

School of Public Policy University of Maryland, Baltimore County
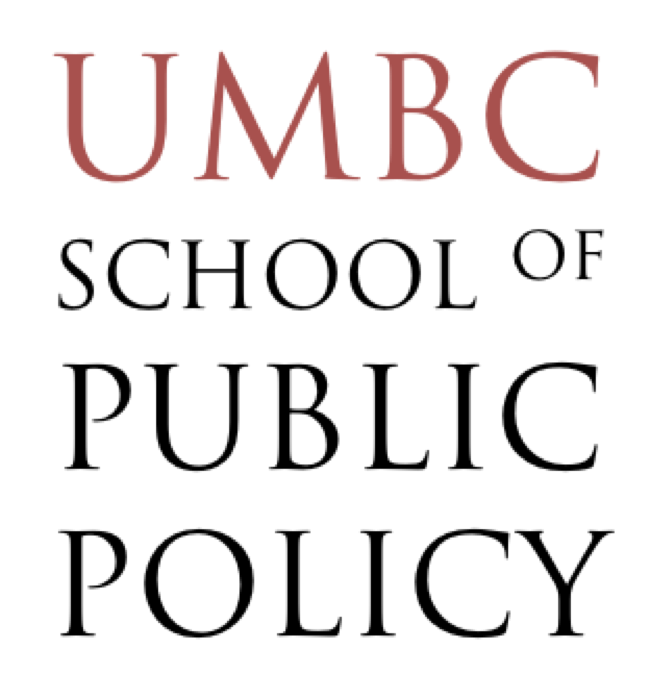
- Type: Public
- Established: 1974
- Director: Susan M. Sterett
- Location: Baltimore, Maryland, United States
- Website: Official website

The Public Policy graduate program at the University of Maryland, Baltimore County was created in 1974 under Chancellor Calvin B. T. Lee. Now known as the School of Public Policy, the program offers the master of public policy and PhD. degrees, and has an enrollment of over 130 students.

== History ==
Six years after the university's establishment, the Policy Sciences Graduate Program was organized as part of the graduate school and began enrollment two years later. The program became the Department of Public Policy in 2003. The following year, the department moved into the newly constructed Public Policy building. In 2014, the department became the School of Public Policy.

== Programs ==
- Master of Public Policy
- Doctor of Philosophy
- Dual degrees in law and public policy with the University of Maryland School of Law, and the University of Baltimore School of Law
- Dual degree MPP/MD with the University of Maryland School of Medicine
- Articulated agreement for MPA/Ph.D. with the University of Baltimore
- Articulated MA/Ph.D. with the Economic Policy Analysis (ECPA) in the Department of Economics, UMBC

== Faculty ==
Faculty and Staff

== Specializations ==
- Economics (Ph.D. only)
- Education Policy
- Emergency Services (Ph.D. only)
- Environmental Policy (MPP only)
- Evaluation and Analytical Methods
- Health Policy
- Policy History (Ph.D. only)
- Public Management
- Urban Policy
