= Paul Weinstein (economist) =

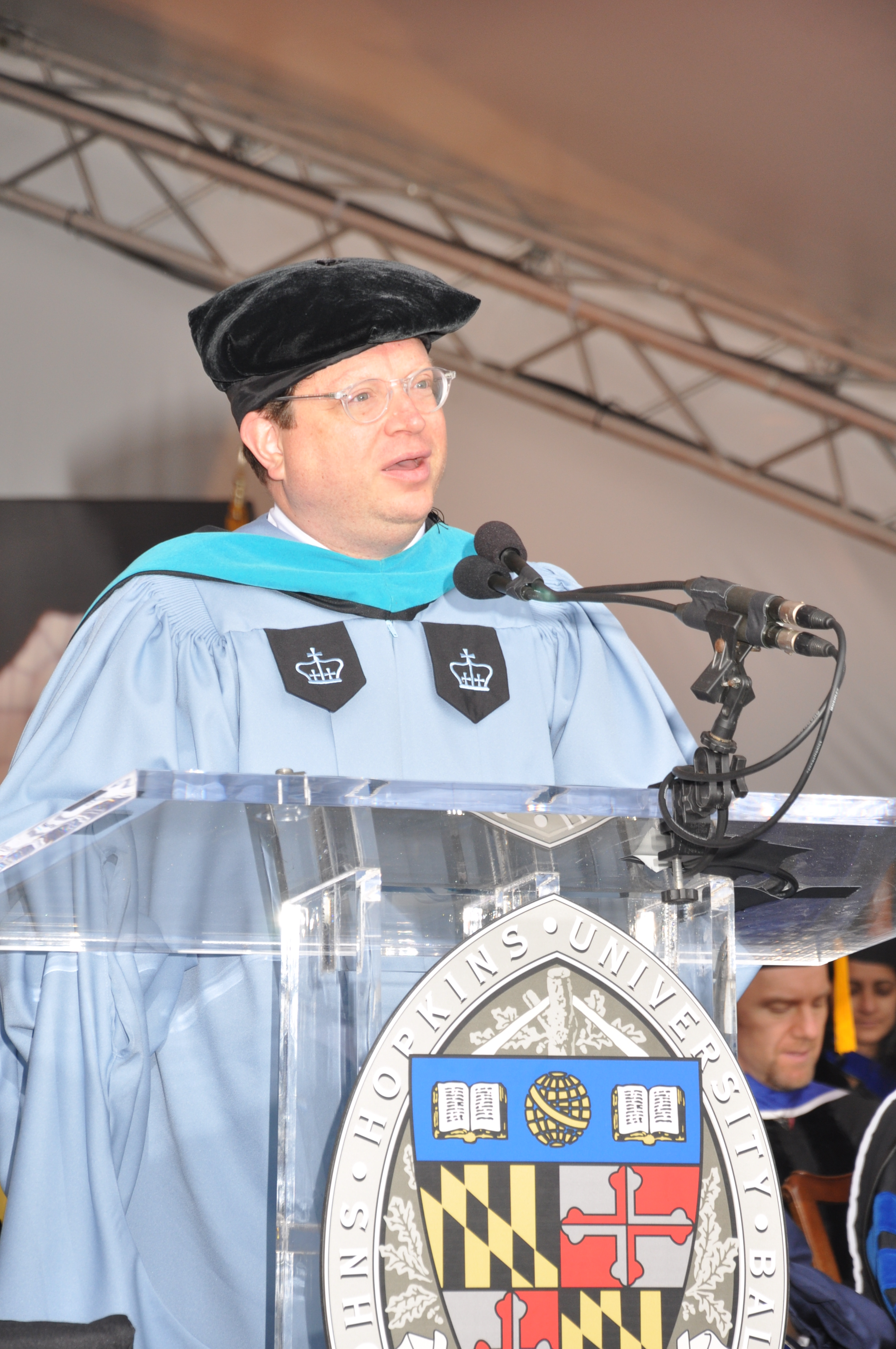
Paul Weinstein Jr. speaking at 2012 Johns Hopkins Commencement

Paul J. Weinstein Jr. founded and directs the Graduate Program in Public Management at Johns Hopkins University and has also taught at Columbia University and Georgetown University. From 2001 to 2009 he was Chief Operating Officer and currently serves as a Senior Fellow and Board Member at the Progressive Policy Institute, a centrist think tank based in Washington, D.C. that was affiliated with the Democratic Leadership Council. Weinstein, who worked for eight years in the Clinton White House, first as Special Assistant to the President and Chief of Staff of the Domestic Policy Council, and later as Senior Adviser for Policy Planning to Vice President Al Gore, is the author of the textbook The Art of Policymaking which is in its second publication. He has written extensively on issues such as economic policy, government spending, Social Security and taxes.

In April 2005, PPI published his proposed policy blueprint Family-Friendly Tax Reform, in which he proposed replacing 68 tax credits and loopholes in the U.S. tax code with the following four tax breaks aimed at low- and middle-income families:

- A $3,000 per year College Tax Credit (CTC), available to any student in college or the first two years of graduate school;
- An "above-the-line" Home Mortgage Deduction (HMD), available to all taxpayers (the current tax deduction for mortgage interest is only available to those who itemize their deductions);
- A Family Tax Credit (FTC), worth $1 for every two $2 earned, up to a predetermined limit, available to all households or individual taxpayers earning less than $120,000 per year
- A Universal Pension (UP), into which a worker can "roll over" his or her 401(k) accounts when he or she changes jobs

Weinstein testified on tax reform before President Bush's Advisory Panel on Federal Tax Reform later that year. In May 2010, Weinstein joined President Obama's National Commission on Fiscal Responsibility and Reform (Simpson-Bowles) as Senior Advisor.

Weinstein is a proponent of moving to 3 year bachelor's degrees to save students and their families money. The idea has received support from those who want to reduce the cost of college but opposed by those who believe a 3-year degree would diminish the college experience.

Weinstein writes on higher education policy, transportation, and financial markets for Forbes.

A number of Weinstein's emails as Special Assistant to the President were released during the confirmation of Supreme Court Justice Elena Kagan.

He earned his Bachelor of Science degree from Georgetown University and his Master's from Columbia University. He is the brother-in-law of musician Billy Straus and the cousin of artist Mary Frank.
