= Australian Public Policy Institute =

Australian think tank

The Australian Public Policy Institute is an independent public policy institute in Australia, previously named the James Martin Institute for Public Policy.

The Institute is based in Sydney and Canberra, Australia and was established in 2021 as a government and university joint venture between the New South Wales Government and three Australian universities: the University of Sydney, University of Technology Sydney, and Western Sydney University. The University of New South Wales, Charles Sturt University and the University of Wollongong have since joined the partnership.

The Institute aims to promote evidence-based policy in Australia. APPI was included in an analysis of evidence institutes around the world undertaken by the Paul Ramsay Foundation, and its research has been referenced in Parliamentary reports and testimony in government enquiries. It has also been referenced as a possible alternative to government contracting for external consultants.

Its recent projects include child protection and out-of-home care reforms, Australian Government reforms for funding university teaching and scholarship, support for the New South Wales Anti-Slavery Commissioner on the office’s Strategic Plan and the regulation and governance of artificial intelligence. The Institute offers an annual round of grants to university research teams. Recent successful projects have explored facial recognition technology, Indigenous-led climate solutions, and electric vehicle uptake. It also offers fellowship opportunities for projects focused on housing, increasing productivity in manufacturing, and other government policy priorities.

APPI hosts public conferences including the annual Oration, last delivered by Australian Governor-General Sam Mostyn AC and previously by former Premier Dominic Perrottet.

The Institute is led by Libby Hackett, former CEO of UK's University Alliance. The Chair of the Board is Peter Varghese AO, former Secretary of the Australian Department of Foreign Affairs and Trade.
