= James C. Cox =

American economist (born 1943)

James Connor Cox (born May 29, 1943) is an American economist. He currently is the Noah Langdale Jr. Chair in Economics and Georgia Research Alliance Eminent Scholar at Georgia State University. He is the Founding Director of the Experimental Economics Center at Georgia State. His research focus is experimental economics, especially theory-testing experiments and experimental methods. Professor Cox is a pioneer in experimental economics and a prominent contributor to the creation and internationalization of the Economic Science Association and creation of its flagship journal, Experimental Economics.

== Honors and offices ==
President of the Economic Science Association, 1997-1999 and President of the Southern Economic Association, 2010–2011. Inaugurated as Fellow of the Economic Science Association in 2024 and Distinguished Fellow of Southern Economic Association in 2023.

== Biography ==
James C. Cox is married and has two sons and two granddaughters. He obtained his BA in economics from the University of California, Davis in 1965 and MA and PhD in economics from Harvard University in 1968 and 1971. He has been a faculty member at the University of Massachusetts, Amherst (1970 – 1977) and the University of Arizona (1977 – 2005) where he was Arizona Public Service Professor and Director of the Economic Science Lab.

After moving to Georgia State University, Professor Cox led creation and development of the Experimental Economics Center (ExCEN). Activities of ExCEN have included National Science Foundation supported development and dissemination of EconPort, an early online site providing experiment software and materials for teaching. ExCEN has organized multiple national and international conferences including FUR XV and the NSF sponsored Eighth Biennial Meeting of the Social Dilemmas Working Group. ExCEN continues to provide facilities for research experiments and development of teaching support materials.

Professor Cox has conducted research in many topic areas ranging from experimental methods to theory-testing experiments to theoretical modeling to mathematical economics to public policy to legal theory and social epistemology. His research is widely cited. A novel output from his collaborative research is development of a patented clinical decision support system for hospital discharge decision making.

== Patent ==
Co-inventor (with Vjollca Sadiraj, Kurt E. Schnier, and John F. Sweeney) of United States Letters Patent No. US 10,622,099 B2 for “Systems and Methods for Supporting Hospital Discharge Decision Making.”

== Selected publications ==
- Cox, James C., Vernon L. Smith, and Bruce Roberson, “Theory and Behavior of Single Object Auctions”, in V.L. Smith (ed), Research in Experimental Economics, vol. 2, (Greenwich: JAI Press, 1982)..
- Cox, James C. and Ronald L. Oaxaca, “Is Bidding Behavior Consistent with Bidding Theory for Private Value Auctions?”, in R.M. Isaac (ed.), Research in Experimental Economics, vol. 6 (Greenwich: JAI Press, 1996)..
- Cox, James C., “How to Identify Trust and Reciprocity”, Games and Economic Behavior, 46, no. 2, 2004, 260–281.
- Cox, James C., Daniel Friedman, and Vjollca Sadiraj “Revealed Altruism”, Econometrica, 76(1), 2008, 31–69.
- Cox, James C. and Duncan James, “Clocks and Trees: Isomorphic Dutch Auctions and Centipede Games”, Econometrica, 80(2), 2012, 883–903.
- Cox, James C., Vjollca Sadiraj, Bodo Vogt, and Utteeyo Dasgupta, “Is There A Plausible Theory for Decision under Risk? A Dual Calibration Critique”, Economic Theory, 54 (2), 2013, 305–333.
- Cox, James C., Vjollca Sadiraj, and Ulrich Schmidt, “Paradoxes and Mechanisms for Choice under Risk”, Experimental Economics, 18(2), 2015, 215–250. Awarded the Editors’ prize for best paper published in Experimental Economics in 2015..
- Cox, James C., Vjollca Sadiraj, and Susan Xu Tang, “Morally Monotonic Choice in Public Good Games”, Experimental Economics, 26, 2023, 697 - 725.
