= James Madison University College of Arts and Letters =

The College of Arts and Letters is one of the academic colleges at James Madison University in Harrisonburg, Virginia. It includes the Schools of Communication, Information, and Media, the School of Liberal Arts, and the School of Public and International Affairs.

== Schools of Communication, Information and Media ==
The Schools of Communication, Information, and Media comprises three separate schools. These are the School of Communication (SCOM), the School of Media Arts and Design (SMAD), and the School of Writing, Rhetoric, and Technical Communication (WRTC).

=== The School of Communication Studies (SCOM) ===
The School of Communication Studies (SCOM) includes seven program areas of specialization. These are Conflict Analysis and Intervention, Cultural Communication, Health Communication, Interpersonal Communication, Organizational Communication, Public Communication, Public Relations. It also includes minors in Conflict and Mediation, Cultural Communication, Health Communication, and Political Communication.

=== The School of Media Arts and Design (SMAD) ===
The School of Media Arts and Design (SMAD) offers student the opportunity to apply into one of the four different concentrations: Creative Advertising] (CA), Digital Video and Cinema (DVC), Interactive Design (ID) and Journalism (J).

=== The School of Writing, Rhetoric, and Technical Communication (WRTC) ===
The School of Writing, Rhetoric, and Technical Communication (WRTC) offers a major and minor in Writing, Rhetoric, and Technical Communication. Students who major in WRTC may choose to concentrate in Technical and Scientific Communication or in Writing and Rhetoric. Under these concentrations, students focus on subjects such as the study of rhetoric, web theory, publications management, design, and technical writing.

== School of Liberal Arts ==
The School of Liberal Arts comprises the Departments of English, Foreign Languages, Literatures, and Cultures, History, Philosophy and Religion, and Sociology and Anthropology.

=== English ===
This department offers a major and minor in English. It also offers concentrations in British or American Literatures, and World Literature.

=== Foreign Languages, Literatures, and Cultures ===
This department offers a major and minor in Modern Foreign Languages. It offers concentrations in French, German, Italian, and Spanish. It offers minors in Arabic, French, German, Italian, Spanish, and Russian. It also offers professional minors in Business French, Business German, Business Italian, Business Spanish, Law Enforcement Spanish, Legal Spanish, Medical Spanish, Spanish-English Translation and Interpretation.

=== History ===
The department of history offers a major and minor in history. It also offers concentrations in Public History, and History and Business. The department also offers a Master of Arts degree with an opportunity for concentration in three fields of history.

=== Philosophy and Religion ===
The Department of Philosophy and Religion offers a Bachelor of Arts in Philosophy and Religion. It also offers concentrations in Philosophy, Interdisciplinary Philosophy, Religion, and Interdisciplinary Religion Concentration.

=== Sociology and Anthropology ===
JMU's anthropology major allows for four concentrations: general anthropology, biological anthropology, cultural anthropology, and archaeology. JMU also provides linguistic anthropology courses to undergraduates.

== School of Public and International Affairs ==
The School of Public Affairs comprises the Department of Political Science and the Department of Justice Studies.

=== Political Science, Public Policy and Administration, International Affairs ===
The Department of Political Science administers three degree programs at the undergraduate level and two degree programs at the master's level. At the undergraduate level, the department administers the B.A. in political science, the B.S. in public policy and administration, and the cross-disciplinary B.A. in international affairs. At the graduate level, it offers an M.A. in political science with a concentration in European Union Policy Studies and a master's in public administration (M.P.A.).
