= The Foundation Review =

Academic philanthropy journal

- Discipline: Social sciences
- Language: English
- Edited by: Teri Behrens

Publication details
- History: 2009-present
- Publisher: Dorothy A. Johnson Center for Philanthropy, Grand Valley State University
- Frequency: Quarterly

Standard abbreviations
- ISO 4: Found. Rev.

Indexing
- ISSN: 1944-5660 (print); 1944-5679 (web)
- LCCN: 2008214222
- OCLC no.: 276784437

Links
- Journal homepage

The Foundation Review is a peer-reviewed academic journal covering philanthropy, grantmaking, and foundation practice. It covers evaluation results, tools, issues confronting the philanthropic sector, and reflective practice. The journal's editor in chief is Teresa (Teri) Behrens of Grand Valley State University. The journal was established in 2009 and is published quarterly by the Dorothy A. Johnson Center for Philanthropy.

The Foundation Review is a hybrid journal, with a mix of subscriber-only and open-access content. Sponsored issues are open access. For non-sponsored issues, individual authors can pay an open-access fee. All content becomes open access after two years.

== Abstracting and indexing ==
The Foundation Review is abstracted and indexed in Scopus and the Emerging Sources Citation Index and in the databases EBSCO, Gale, and ProQuest.
