= Voluntas (journal) =

- Language: English
- Edited by: Marlene Walk, Fredrik Andersson, and Galia Chiamak

Publication details
- History: 1990-present
- Publisher: Cambridge University Press for the International Society for Third-Sector Research
- Frequency: Quarterly

Standard abbreviations
- ISO 4: Voluntas

Indexing
- CODEN: VOLUE8
- ISSN: 0957-8765 (print); 1573-7888 (web)
- LCCN: 98645418
- OCLC no.: 44514128

Links
- Journal homepage

Voluntas: International Journal of Voluntary and Nonprofit Organizations is a peer-reviewed academic journal covering research on the third sector. It is the official journal of the International Society for Third-Sector Research. It was established in 1990 with Helmut Anheier and Martin Knapp as its founding editors-in-chief. Its current editors are Ruth Simsa (University of Vienna) & Taco Brandsen (Radboud University Nijmegen).
