= Journal of Nonprofit & Public Sector Marketing =

- Discipline: Communication studies
- Language: English
- Edited by: C. Anthony Di Benedetto

Publication details
- Publisher: Routledge
- Frequency: Quarterly

Standard abbreviations
- ISO 4: J. Nonprofit Public Sect. Mark.

Indexing
- ISSN: 1049-5142 (print); 1540-6997 (web)

Links
- Journal homepage

The Journal of Nonprofit & Public Sector Marketing is a quarterly peer-reviewed academic journal which covers topics related to political communication, public relations, and marketing strategy. Published by Routledge, it is indexed in Scopus, PsycINFO, Political Science Complete, and Public Affairs Index.
