= International Society for Third-Sector Research =

Researching Company

- Abbreviation: ISTR
- Website: www.istr.org

The International Society for Third-Sector Research (ISTR), founded in 1992, is an international association that is dedicated to promoting research and education on civil society, philanthropy, and the nongovernmental sector. ISTR works to unite scholars and researchers to exchange ideas and advance knowledge on both a local and international scale, regarding the third sector, human welfare and international development.

Since its founding, ISTR has been housed at The Johns Hopkins University, most currently residing under the Bloomberg School of Public Health’s Institute for Health and Social Policy. According to their website, ISTR’s mission is “to increase, share, and apply knowledge about the Third Sector in all countries of the world” and to build a global community of scholars and researchers for the advancement of knowledge and discussions regarding the Third Sector, and its global impact.

ISTR holds biennial conferences as well as Regional Network meetings, allowing locally focused researchers to meet and discuss region-specific issues. Additionally, the organization is working to increase the number of third sector researchers from the developing world and East and Central Europe. Both the international and regionally held meetings, along with other ISTR-led endeavors, comprise a large part of achieving the organization’s vision.

Currently, ISTR has nearly 900 members from 76 countries globally. The organization has been recognized for its role in shaping development globally through the research of its members.

According to the organization Learning To Give, the main aim of the network has been to create a space for collaboration in order to understand and make use of the positive impact of the third sector. In this regard, “ISTR has almost single handedly changed the face of the third-sector around the globe. Associations are no longer forced to operate on information islands with little communication exchange, since the ISTR has opened up a dialogue for scholars and practitioners who benefit from one another on an international basis”.

ISTR was admitted as an affiliate member of the American Council of Learned Societies in 1997. Aside from being a member of numerous civil society groups, ISTR is itself composed of a network of researchers, other civil society actors, and students. Other research networks that collaborate with ISTR include the European Research Network on Philanthropy (ERNOP), and the EMES International Research.

== Leadership ==
The ISTR leadership team is run by a 15-member board of directors that is staffed by an Executive Director, Megan Haddock, and two staff members.

== Regional networks ==
ISTR is composed of five regional networks. These include: Africa Regional Network, Asia Pacific Regional Network, European Regional Network, Latin American and the Caribbean Network, and Post Soviet Regional Network.

== International conferences ==
Every two years ISTR holds a conference in a different country to bring together members to discuss new research in the third sector and promote. ISTR has had 12 of these international conferences with the most recent one being held in Stockholm, Sweden in 2016. A list of the locations of previous conferences is given below.

- Pecs, Hungary 1994
- Mexico City, Mexico 1996
- Geneva, Switzerland 1998
- Dublin, Ireland 2000
- Cape Town, South Africa2002
- Toronto, Canada 2004
- Bangkok, Thailand 2006
- Barcelona, Spain 2008
- Istanbul, Turkey 2010
- Siena, Italy 2012
- Muenster, Germany 2014
- Stockholm, Sweden 2016
- Amsterdam, Netherlands 2018
- Virtual, 2021
- Montreal, Canada 2022
- Antwerp, Belgium 2024

The next international conference is set to take place in Lisbon, Portugal in July 2026.

ISTR also holds regional network meetings.

Africa Regional Network Conferences

- 2016 Accra, Ghana
- 2013 Nairobi, Kenya
- 2011 Stellenbosch, South Africa

Asia Pacific Regional Network Conferences

- 2015 Tokyo, Japan
- 2013 Seoul, Korea
- 2011 Bali Indonesia
- 2009 Taipei, Taiwan
- 2007 Manila, Philippines
- 2005 Bangalore, India
- 2003 Beijing, China
- 2001 Osaka, Japan
- 1999 Bangkok, Thailand

Latin America and the Caribbean Regional Network Conferences

- 2015 San Juan/Ponce, Puerto Rico
- 2013 Santiago, Chile
- 2011 Buenos Aires, Argentina
- 2009 Mexico City, Mexico
- 2007 Salvador de Bahia, Brazil
- 2005 Lima, Peru
- 2003 San Jose, Costa Rica
- 2001 Buenos Aires, Argentina
- 1999 Santiago, Chile
- 1997 Rio de Janeiro, Brazil
- 1996 Mexico City, Mexico

== Publications ==
ISTR publishes an interdisciplinary research and policy journal, Voluntas, six times a year, offering a platform for scholarly theory, empirical studies, and critical commentary, and providing a central forum for international research in the third. The journal combines full-length articles with shorter research notes and book reviews.

Voluntas is published six times a year and has occasional thematic issues. Some thematic issues include Civil Society and Happiness: Japan and Beyond (Volume 26, Number 1 February 2015), Civil Society and Third Sector in Asia (Volume 26, Number 4 August 2015), Welfare Mix and Hybridity (Volume 26, Number 5 October 2015), Unlikely Partners? Evolving Government-Nonprofit Relationships, East and West (Lester M. Salamon Guest-Editor) (Volume 26, Number 6 December 2015), Latin America (Volume 27, Number 1 February 2016), and Citizenship in China (Volume 27, Number 5 October 2016).
