= Johnson Shoyama Graduate School of Public Policy =

Public policy school in Saskatchewan, Canada

- Established: 2007
- Director: Loleen Berdahl
- Location: Saskatoon and Regina, Saskatchewan, Canada; 52°8′3.57″N 106°38′24.95″W
- Campus: University of Regina and University of Saskatchewan
- Website: www.schoolofpublicpolicy.sk.ca

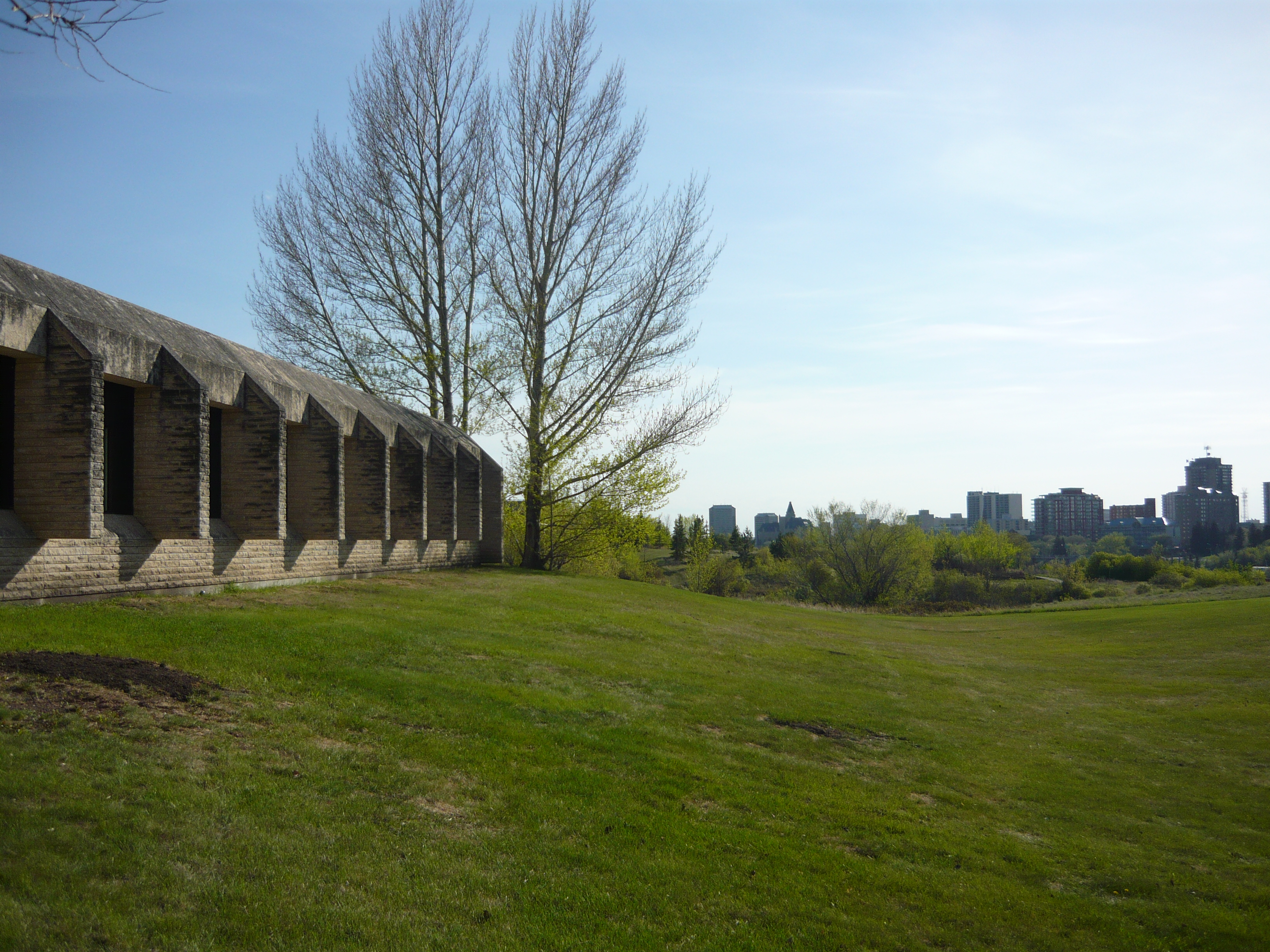
The school's facility in the Diefenbaker Centre at the University of Saskatchewan, with the Saskatoon skyline

Established in 2007, the Johnson Shoyama Graduate School of Public Policy (JSGS) is a centre for advanced education, research and training in policy and administration. It has locations at the University of Regina and the University of Saskatchewan.

The school is named after two of Saskatchewan's best-known public servants, Albert Wesley Johnson and Thomas Shoyama. The school offers five graduate programs - Master of Public Administration (MPA, professional degree, Canadian Association of Programs in Public Administration (CAPPA) accredited), Master of Public Policy (MPP, research-based degree), PhD in Public Policy (PhD, research-based degree), Master of International Trade (MIT, online delivery), Master of Health Administration (MHA, online delivery), five Master's Certificates, and executive and board education. The School employs faculty that include two Canada Research Chairs.
