= University of Massachusetts Amherst School of Public Policy =

School at the University of Massachusetts

Coordinates: 42°23′5.63″N 72°31′19.84″W

School of Public Policy
- College of Social and Behavioral Sciences; University of Massachusetts Amherst
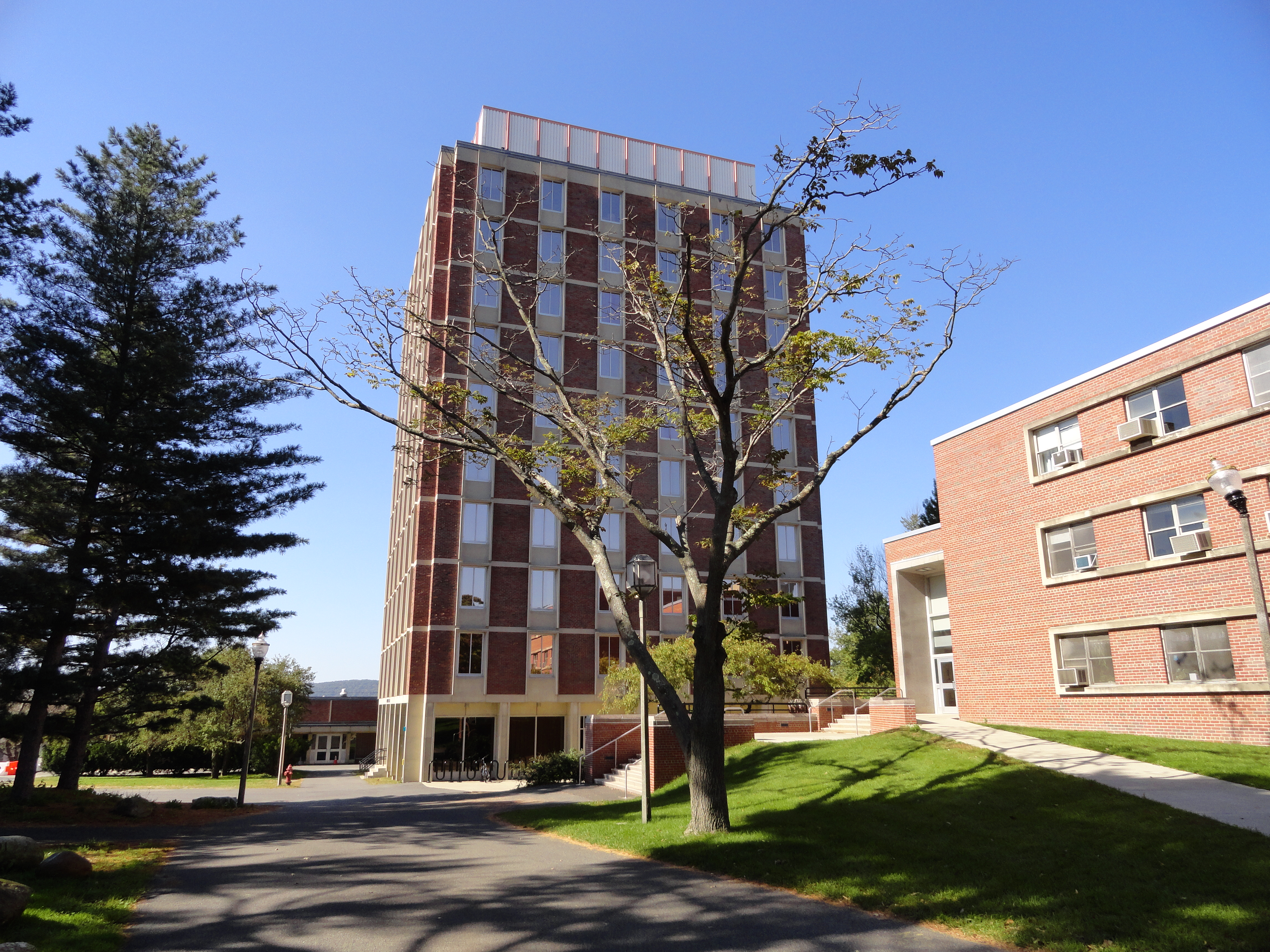
- John F. Thompson Hall

- Logo
- Location: 200 Hicks Way, Amherst, Massachusetts
- Abbreviation: SPP
- Established: 2016; 10 years ago
- Former names: Center for Public Policy & Administration
- Colors
- Gender: Co-educational
- Director: Jane Fountain

The University of Massachusetts Amherst School of Public Policy is a school at the University of Massachusetts Amherst. Formerly known and operated as the Center for Public Policy & Administration, the center was elevated to a school in 2016 to reflect its expanding mission. It offers an undergraduate major in Public Policy and professional master's degrees in Public Affairs (one-year MPA) and Public Policy & Administration (two-year MPPA). In October 2019, the school announced a five-year expansion plan that included the creation of an undergraduate public policy major, which launched in the fall of 2022, as well as expansion of the faculty through tenure lines for faculty appointments solely in the School of Public Policy.

The school's alumni include Amy Ferrer, Director of the American Philosophical Association.
