= Master of Public Policy =

Master's level professional degree

The Master of Public Policy (MPP) is a graduate-level professional degree. It provides training in policy analysis and program evaluation at public policy schools. The MPP program places a focus on the systematic analysis of issues related to public policy and the decision processes associated with them. This includes training in the role of economic and political factors in public decision-making and policy formulation; microeconomic analysis of policy options and issues; resource allocation and decision modeling; cost/benefit analysis; statistical methods; and various applications to specific public policy topics. MPP graduates serve or have served in the public sector, at the international, national, subnational, and local levels and the private sector.

== MPP and MPA: differences and similarities ==
Over time, the curriculum of master of public policy and the master of public administration (MPA) degrees have tended to overlap in many areas, due to the realization that policy analysts and program evaluators could benefit from an understanding of public administration, and vice versa.

Today, the core course offerings of many MPA and MPP programs are similar, with MPA programs also providing training in policy analysis, and MPP programs also providing coursework in program implementation. However, MPP programs still place more emphasis on policy analysis, research, and evaluation, while MPA programs place more emphasis on the implementation of public policies and the design of effective programs and projects to achieve public policy goals. In recognition of the overlapping coursework and subject matter, some universities have begun offering a combined MPAP or MPPA degree, master of public administration and policy or master of public policy and administration. Several institutions use "public policy" as an umbrella term, which may house several programs such as an MPA and degrees related to highly specific areas focusing on fields such as survey research or nonprofit studies.

Significant differences between the two degrees:

- The scope of each degree: An MPA has a broader focus, emphasizing the management and administration of public service organizations, while an MPP has a narrower focus, centering on the analysis of policy issues and the design of solutions for them.
- Coursework: An MPA typically entails a greater emphasis on management and administrative areas, including budgeting, personnel management, and public law. On the other hand, an MPP requires courses that place more emphasis on policy analysis, political theory, and research methods.
- Professional opportunities: With an MPA degree, you can explore diverse roles within the government or nonprofit sector, while an MPP degree is more likely to lead to policy-focused positions.
- Post-graduate programs: An MPA degree often serves as a stepping stone to various postgraduate programs, such as law school or public health administration. In contrast, an MPP degree does not usually offer as many opportunities for further study.
- Cost: Compared to the MPP program, an MPA program tends to be more expensive due to its additional coursework and longer duration.

== Interdisciplinary approach ==
Over the years MPP programs have become more interdisciplinary drawing from economics, sociology, anthropology, politics, and regional planning. In general, a core curriculum of an MPP program includes courses on microeconomics, public finance, research methods, statistics and advanced data analysis, qualitative research, population methods, politics of policy process, policy analysis, ethics, public management, urban policy and GIS, program evaluation, and more.

All these courses are designed to equip MPP graduates with skills and knowledge in advanced economic analysis, political analysis, ethical analysis, data analysis, management and leadership. Depending on the interest, MPP students can concentrate in many policy areas including urban policy, global policy, social policy, health policy, energy and environmental policy, non-profit management, transportation, economic development, education, information technology, and population research.

== See also ==
- Master of Public Affairs
- Master of Public Administration
- Master of Nonprofit Organizations
- List of master's degrees
- Public policy school
- Master of Business Administration
- Doctor of Public Administration
