= Nonprofit studies =

Nonprofit studies or nonprofit management is a multidisciplinary field of teaching and research that focuses on practices of the nonprofit sector and can date back to the 1920s. This area of inquiry examines the management and effectiveness of the nonprofit sector.

Nonprofit studies may also refer to studies of the voluntary sector, third sector, nongovernmental organizations, or civil society.

== Training ==
The Master of Nonprofit Organizations (MNO or MNPO), Master of Non-profit Management (MNM), Master of Not-for-Profit Leadership (MNPL), Master of Nonprofit Studies (MNpS), Master of Public Affairs (MPA), Master of Philanthropic Studies, Master of Nonprofit Administration (MNA), Master of Public Administration in Nonprofit Management (MPA), Master of Business Administration in Nonprofit Management (MBA), and similarly named degrees offer graduate-level training in nonprofit studies, management, and leadership in the nonprofit sector.

As evidenced by the lack of a uniform name, degrees in nonprofit management are a relatively new phenomenon. While some universities have established centers for nonprofit studies, such as the Mandel Center for Nonprofit Organizations at Case Western Reserve University, the Institute for Nonprofit Organizations at the University of Georgia, the Center on Philanthropy at Indiana University, and the ASU Lodestar Center for Philanthropy and Nonprofit Innovation at Arizona State University, most nonprofit management programs are within schools of social work, public administration, or management. However, as the field has grown, there are increasing numbers of free-standing graduate and undergraduate programs not bound within traditional disciplines. The Nonprofit Academic Centers Council (NACC) has developed curricular guidelines for degree programs in the nonprofit and philanthropic studies field that has helped to guide many universities in the development of their degree and certificate programs. In 1983, the School of Management at the University of San Francisco was the first institution in the nation to offer the Master of Nonprofit Administration (MNA) program.

=== Curriculum ===
A typical nonprofit Master's program would require coursework in most or all of the following subjects:

- Strategic Planning, Organizational Development, and/or Nonprofit Finance
- Fundraising
- Ethics
- Program Evaluation
- Human Resource Development and/or Volunteer Management
- Nonprofit Law

Program structures include traditional resident graduate programs, part-time programs for working professionals, and correspondence or online programs. In addition, many universities offering master's degrees also offer graduate certificates for students pursuing a graduate degree in another discipline.

=== USA institutions offering master's degrees in nonprofit organizations ===
- All Hallows College
- American International College
- American Jewish University
- Arizona State University
- Bay Path University
- Capella University
- Case Western Reserve University
- Cleveland State University
- DePaul University
- Eastern University
- Florida Atlantic University
- Hamline University
- Heidelberg University
- Indiana University
- John Carroll University
- La Salle University
- Louisiana State University in Shreveport
- Metropolitan State University
- The New School
- New York University Wagner Graduate School for Public Service
- North Park University
- Northeastern University
- Notre Dame of Maryland University
- Oklahoma City University
- Oral Roberts University Graduate School of Business
- Regis University
- Saint Mary's University of Minnesota
- Seattle University
- Universidad del Sagrado Corazón
- University of Central Florida
- University of Colorado Denver
- University of Delaware
- University of Georgia
- University of Houston–Downtown
- University of Northern Iowa
- University of Notre Dame
- University of San Diego
- University of San Francisco
- University of Southern California
- University of Oregon
- University of Wisconsin–Milwaukee
- Washington University in St Louis
- Worcester State College

=== USA institutions offering online master's degrees in nonprofit organizations ===
- Adler University
- Bay Path University
- Capella University
- La Salle University
- Lasell College
- Louisiana State University in Shreveport
- Marylhurst University
- North Park University
- Our Lady of the Lake University
- Regis University
- Southern New Hampshire University
- University of Central Florida
- University of Houston–Downtown
- University of Northern Iowa
- University of the Rockies
- University of Southern California
- Upper Iowa University
- Walden University

== Nonprofit research ==
=== Academic journals ===
- Annals of Public and Cooperative Economics
- The Foundation Review
- Nonprofit and Voluntary Sector Quarterly
- Voluntas: International Journal of Voluntary and Nonprofit Organizations
- Human Service Organizations: Management, Leadership & Governance
- Nonprofit Management and Leadership
- Nonprofit Business Advisor
- Journal of Nonprofit & Public Sector Marketing
- Journal of Community Practice
- Third Sector Review
- Journal of Philanthropy and Marketing
- The Nonprofit Review
- Social Enterprise Journal
- Journal of Nonprofit Law (by NYU / IRS-related policy groups)
- The Foundation Review
- Nonprofit Policy Forum
- Voluntary Sector Review
- Canadian Journal of Nonprofit and Social Economy Research
- The China Nonprofit Review
- Journal of Nonprofit Education and Leadership (JNEL)
- Journal of Public and Nonprofit Affairs (JPNA)
- Journal of Muslim Philanthropy & Civil Society
- International Review of Philanthropy and Social Investment
- Journal of Nonprofit Innovation (JoNI)
- Philanthropia
- Financial Accountability & Management
- Journal of Social Entrepreneurship
- Philanthropy & Education
- Journal of Civil Society
- Annals of Public and Cooperative Economics
- Journal of Governmental and Nonprofit Accounting
