= Master of Public Administration =

Professional post-graduate degree in Public Administration

The academic qualification of Master of Public Administration (MPA) is a specialized professional graduate degree in public administration. Its course of studies prepares students for roles as leaders, and resembles or mirrors training for qualification as a Master of Business Administration, but with an emphasis on issues of public services.

This program covers principles of public administration, policy development, and management. Graduates may work in government, nonprofits, or private companies. The specifics of the program can vary by university or country. It typically requires two years for completion.

== Overview ==
The MPA program is a higher professional degree and a postgraduate degree for the public sector and it prepares individuals to serve as managers, executives and policy analysts in the executive arm of local, state/provincial, and federal/national government, and increasingly in non-governmental organization (NGO) and nonprofit sectors; it places a focus on the practices of executive organization and management. Instruction includes the roles, development, and principles of public administration; public policy management and implementation.

Through its history, the MPA degree has become more interdisciplinary by drawing from fields such as economics, sociology, law, anthropology, organizational development, political science, and regional planning in order to equip MPA graduates with skills and knowledge covering a broad range of topics and disciplines relevant to the public sector. A core curriculum of a typical MPA program usually includes courses on microeconomics, public finance, research methods, statistics, policy analysis, managerial accounting, ethics, public management, geographic information systems (GIS), and program evaluation. MPA students may focus their studies on public sector fields such as urban planning, emergency management, transportation, health care (especially public health), economic development, community development, non-profit management, environmental policy, cultural policy, international affairs, and criminal justice.

== Notable MPA graduates ==
- Lee Hsien Loong, former Prime Minister of Singapore
- Juan Manuel Santos, Nobel Peace Prize laureate and former President of Colombia
- Ban Ki-moon, former UN Secretary-General
- Felipe Calderón, former president of Mexico
- Carlos Salinas de Gortari, former president of Mexico
- Miguel de la Madrid, former president of Mexico
- Pierre Elliott Trudeau, former Canadian Prime Minister
- Eduardo Rodríguez Veltzé, former President of Bolivia
- Jamil Mahuad Witt (MPA '89), former President of Ecuador
- José María Figueres Olsen, former President of Costa Rica
- David Petraeus, former CIA Director
- Ellen Johnson Sirleaf, former president of Liberia
- Vuk Jeremić, Foreign Minister of Serbia
- Raymond Kelly, former New York City Police Commissioner Raymond Kelly
- Kathleen Sebelius, former Secretary of Health and Human Services
- Josh Frydenberg, former Treasurer of Australia
- Ashley Judd, actress
- U.S. Representative Dan Crenshaw
- Eric Adams, former New York City Mayor
- Bill O'Reilly
- Chesley Sullenberger, pilot

A Master of Public Administration can be acquired at various institutions. See List of schools offering MPA degrees.

== See also ==
- Master of Public Affairs
- Master of Public Policy
- Master of Nonprofit Organizations
- Public policy schools
- Master of Business Administration
- Doctor of Public Administration
- List of master's degrees
