= Kenneth J. Meier =

Professor of political science

Kenneth J. Meier (born March 3, 1950) is a distinguished scholar in residence at American University and holds faculty appointments at the Cardiff School of Business (UK) and Leiden University (the Netherlands). He is known for his studies on public management and public administration, as well as his extensive and widely referenced journal articles.

== Career ==
Meier obtained a bachelor's degree from the University of South Dakota. Meier, a former high school shot put champion, also competed for the track teams at the University of Nebraska and the University of South Dakota. In 1974–1975, he received an M.A. and a Ph.D. from the Maxwell School of Citizenship and Public Affairs at Syracuse University in political science. After working on the faculty at Rice University and University of Oklahoma, he joined the University of Wisconsin–Madison in 1985. Between 1989 and 1997 he was professor of political science at the University of Wisconsin–Milwaukee. Meier was a professor of political science at Texas A&M University from 1998 to 2017, holding the title of Charles H. Gregory Chair in Liberal Arts.

Meier is a distinguished scholar in residence at American University from 2018 to the present. In addition, he is a professor of public management at Cardiff Business School and a professor of public administration at Leiden University.

He is a former editor-in-chief of Journal of Public Administration Research and Theory (JPART), for which he previously served as associate editor and co-editor. He was also the editor of the American Journal of Political Science from 1994-1997. Meier is the founding editor of Perspectives on Public Management and Governance (PPMG) and founder and editor of the Journal of Behavioral Public Administration (JBPA). He currently serves as the director of the Public Management Research Association (PMRA) journals.

== Selected awards and honors ==
- Charles Levine Memorial Award, American Society for Public Administration and National Association of Schools of Public Affairs and Administration, 2005
- Fellow, National Academy of Public Administration, 2005
- John Gaus Award, American Political Science Association, 2006
- Dwight Waldo Award, American Society for Public Administration, 2010
- H. George Frederickson Award, Public Management Research Association, 2011

== Selected publications ==
- Meier, Kenneth J. (1985). Regulation: politics, bureaucracy, and economics. New York: St. Martin's. ISBN 978-0-312-66971-3.
- Sylvia, Ronald D.; Meier, Kenneth J.; Gunn, Elizabeth M. (1985). Program planning and evaluation for the public manager. Monterey, CA: Brooks/Cole. ISBN 978-0-534-04710-8.
- Meier, Kenneth J. (1988). The political economy of regulation: the case of insurance. Albany, NY: State University of New York. ISBN 978-0-88706-731-0.
- Meier, Kenneth J.; Stewart, Joseph; England, Robert E. (1989). Race, class, and education: the politics of second-generation discrimination. Madison, WI: University of Wisconsin. ISBN 978-0-299-12210-2.
- Meier, Kenneth J.; Stewart, Joseph (1991). The politics of Hispanic education: un paso pa'lante y dos pa'tras. Albany, NY: State University of New York. ISBN 978-0-7914-0507-9.
- Meier, Kenneth J. (1994). The politics of sin: drugs, alcohol, and public policy. Armonk, NY: M.E. Sharpe. ISBN 978-1-56324-298-4.
- Smith, Kevin B.; Meier, Kenneth J. (1995). The case against school choice: politics, markets, and fools. Armonk, NY: M.E. Sharpe. ISBN 978-1-56324-519-0.
- Haider-Markel, Donald P.; Meier, Kenneth J. (1996). "The politics of gay and lesbian rights: expanding the scope of the conflict" (PDF). Journal of Politics. 58 (2): 332–349. doi:10.2307/2960229. hdl:1808/13711. JSTOR 2960229. S2CID 55035659.
- Waterman, Richard W.; Meier, Kenneth J. (1998). "Principal-agent models: an expansion?". Journal of Public Administration Research and Theory. 8 (2): 173–202. doi:10.1093/oxfordjournals.jpart.a024377.
- O'Toole Jr., Laurence J.; Meier, Kenneth J. (1999). "Modeling the impact of public management: implications of structural context". Journal of Public Administration Research and Theory. 9 (4): 505–526. doi:10.1093/oxfordjournals.jpart.a024421.
- Meier, Kenneth J.; Gill, Jeff (2000). What works: a new approach to program and policy analysis. Boulder, CO: Westview Press. ISBN 978-0-8133-9782-5.
- McFarlane, Deborah R.; Meier, Kenneth J. (2001). The politics of fertility control: family planning and abortion policies in the American state. New York: Chatham House Publishers. ISBN 978-1-889119-39-7.
- Meier, Kenneth J.; O'Toole Jr., Laurence J. (2001). "Managerial strategies and behavior in networks: a model with evidence from U.S. public education". Journal of Public Administration Research and Theory. 11 (3): 271–294. doi:10.1093/oxfordjournals.jpart.a003503.
- Meier, Kenneth J.; O'Toole Jr., Laurence J. (2002). "Public management and organizational performance: the effect of managerial quality" (PDF). Journal of Policy Analysis and Management. 21 (4): 629–643. doi:10.1002/pam.10078.
- Krause, George A.; Meier, Kenneth J. (2003). Politics, policy, and organizations: frontiers in the scientific study of bureaucracy. Ann Arbor: University of Michigan. ISBN 978-0-472-11317-0.
- Meier, Kenneth J.; O'Toole Jr., Laurence J. (2003). "Public management and educational performance: the impact of managerial networking" (PDF). Public Administration Review. 63 (6): 689–699. doi:10.1111/1540-6210.00332.
- Meier, Kenneth J.; O'Toole Jr., Laurence J., eds. (2006). Bureaucracy in a democratic state: a governance perspective. Baltimore, MD: Johns Hopkins University. ISBN 978-0-8018-8356-9.
- Meier, Kenneth J.; O'Toole Jr., Laurence J.; Goerdel, Holly T. (2006). "Management activity and program performance: gender as management capital". Public Administration Review. 66 (1): 24–36. doi:10.1111/j.1540-6210.2006.00553.x.
- Meier, Kenneth J.; O'Toole Jr., Laurence J. (2006). "Political control versus bureaucratic values: reframing the debate". Public Administration Review. 66 (2): 177–192. doi:10.1111/j.1540-6210.2006.00571.x.
- Meier, Kenneth J.; O'Toole Jr., Laurence J.; Boyne, George A.; Walker, Richard M. (2006). "Strategic management and the performance of public organizations: testing venerable ideas against recent theories". Journal of Public Administration Research and Theory. 17 (3): 357–377. doi:10.1093/jopart/mul017.
- Meier, Kenneth J.; Bohte, John (2007). Politics and the bureaucracy: policy making in the fourth branch of government (5th ed.). Belmont, CA: Thomson/Wadsworth. ISBN 978-0-495-00747-0.
- Leal, David L.; Meier, Kenneth J. (2011). The politics of Latino education. New York, NY: Teachers College Press. ISBN 978-0-8077-5142-8.
- O'Toole Jr., Laurence J.; Meier, Kenneth J. (2011). Public management: organizations, governance, and performance. Cambridge and New York: Cambridge University. ISBN 978-1-107-00441-2.
- Meier, Kenneth J.; Brudney, Jeffrey L.; Bohte, John (2012). Applied statistics for public and nonprofit administration (8th ed.). Boston: Wadsworth Cengage Learning. ISBN 978-1-111-34280-7.
