= Patricia M. Shields =

Political scientist

- Born: 1951 (age 74–75)

Philosophical work
- Main interests: Research methods, civil-military relations, gender studies, public administration, pragmatism, privatization, peace studies
- Notable ideas: Applying pragmatism to public administration

Patricia M. Shields is an American political scientist and public administration scholar. She is a Regents' Professor and University Distinguished Professor Emeritus at Texas State University. Her research focuses on public administration, civil–military relations, research methodology, pragmatism, peace studies, and gender in public policy. She served as editor-in-chief of Armed Forces & Society from 2001 to 2025 and is a fellow of the National Academy of Public Administration.

== Biography ==
She received a BA in Economics from the University of Maryland - College Park, an MA in Economics and a PhD in Public Administration from The Ohio State University. Her doctoral dissertation examined determinants of military service during the Vietnam era.

== Career ==
Shields began teaching at Texas State University, then known as Southwest Texas State University, in 1978 and received tenure in 1984. She served as director of the university's Master of Public Administration (MPA) program from 1997 to 2014 and 2016-2017, overseeing its curriculum and applied research projects. Her teaching has included statistics, public finance, public policy, public-sector economics, ethics, and research methods.

In 2001, Shields became editor-in-chief of Armed Forces & Society, an interdisciplinary peer-reviewed journal devoted to civil–military relations broadly defined. She held the position through 2025. She also served on the editorial boards of Public Administration Review, Administration & Society, Administrative Theory and Praxis, US Army War College Quarterly Journal: Parameters, and the Journal of Public Affairs Education.

Shields is notable for her publications focusing on research methods, civil military relations, gender issues, pragmatism in public administration, peace studies, and the contributions of Jane Addams to public administration and peace theory.

== Research ==
Shields's scholarship intentionally crosses traditional disciplinary boundaries, linking public administration, peace studies, civil–military relations, and social science research methodology. Grounded in classical and feminist pragmatism, her work treats the logic of inquiry as an organizing bridge across these fields. Drawing on Jane Addams's settlement model and municipal housekeeping, Shields connects experimental, community-based inquiry with peacebuilding, military studies, and applied research methods.

=== Public administration and pragmatism ===
Shields's research examines the use of classical pragmatism in public administration. Drawing on the writings of Charles Sanders Peirce, William James and John Dewey, she has explored the role of practical inquiry, public participation and experimentation in administrative theory and decision-making.

In her 2003 article, "The Community of Inquiry: Classical Pragmatism and Public Administration," published in Administration & Society, Shields examined the relevance of the pragmatist concept of a community of inquiry to public administration. She argued that collaborative investigation and participatory democracy provide a framework for addressing administrative problems and connecting evidence with practice.

Her 2008 article, "Rediscovering the Taproot: Is Classical Pragmatism the Route to Renew Public Administration?", further explored the historical relationship between pragmatism and the field. She identified practical, pluralistic, participatory, and provisional inquiry as principles that could inform public administration research and practice.

=== Research Methodology ===
Shields's research on social science methodology examines the relationship between philosophical theory and research design. Drawing on pragmatism, she has written about problem formulation, different forms of inquiry and the justification of research methods, including the use of mixed methods.

In A Playbook for Research Methods: Integrating Conceptual Frameworks with Project Management, co-authored with Nandhini Rangarajan, Shields discusses the use of conceptual frameworks in research design. In another work with Mattia Casula and Rangarajan, she examined the use of working hypotheses in deductive and exploratory research.

=== Peace studies ===
Shields's research on civil–military relations covers the relationship between military organizations and society. Her work examines military recruitment, conscription, gender, military families, and the organizational requirements of expeditionary and peacekeeping forces.

She has also written about organizational ambidexterity, particularly how military organizations balance stability with adaptation and manage competing operational demands.

Her research on peace studies addresses the distinction between negative peace, defined as the absence of direct violence, and positive peace, which involves the social and institutional conditions that support peaceful societies. She has examined the relevance of these concepts to public administration and civil–military relations in articles published in Parameters and other academic journals.

=== Gender and public administration ===
Shields has researched women's participation in public administration and the historical relationship between reform movements, public service, and democratic participation. Her scholarship examines women in public policy, women's military service, and the contribution of women reformers to administrative theory.

Shields co-edited The Handbook on Gender and Public Administration with Nicole M. Elias, published in 2022.

In her work on administrative theory Shields joins scholars such as Stivers, Burnier, Gabriele, and Schachter, advocating for greater recognition of the settlement model of public administration as a foundational tradition in public administration alongside traditional bureaucratic approaches. Distinguishing her contribution, Shields examines Jane Addams not merely as a social reformer or practitioner, but as a pioneering feminist pragmatist philosopher. Across works such as Jane Addams: Progressive Pioneer of Peace, Philosophy, Sociology, Social Work and Public Administration and The Oxford Handbook of Jane Addams, Shields emphasizes how Addams’s philosophical concepts—including participatory democracy, social ethics, sympathetic understanding, and positive peace—provide a vital normative and epistemological framework for modern public service.

=== Research Methods ===
Shields's research on social science methodology examines the relationship between philosophical theory and applied research design. Drawing on classical pragmatism, particularly the work of Charles Sanders Peirce and John Dewey, she has addressed the formulation of research questions, the selection of conceptual frameworks and their relationship to empirical inquiry. In her 1998 chapter, "Pragmatism as a Philosophy of Science: A Tool for Public Administration", she discussed how pragmatic principles can inform research methods and connect theoretical concepts with empirical evidence. Her subsequent work examined the role of conceptual frameworks in aligning research purposes, data collection and analysis.

Shields, with Nandhini Rangarajan, developed a framework for connecting research purposes with conceptual frameworks and methods of inquiry in A Playbook for Research Methods: Integrating Conceptual Frameworks with Project Management. Their approach identifies five research purposes: exploration, description, gauging, decision-making and explanation, and associates each with a corresponding conceptual framework: working hypotheses, formal categories, practical ideal types, operations research models and formal hypotheses. The framework addresses how research questions, conceptual frameworks and evidence can be aligned across different forms of inquiry. While explanatory research commonly employs formal hypotheses to examine relationships between variables, exploratory and evaluative research use other conceptual structures suited to their respective purposes. In subsequent collaborative publications with Mattia Casula and Rangarajan, Shields further examined the relationship between research purpose, conceptual frameworks and methodological coherence in deductive, exploratory and evaluation research.

== Recognition ==
- 2020–2021: Regents' Professor, Texas State University System.
- 2020: Presidential Distinction Award for Excellence in Scholarly Creative Activity, Texas State University.
- 2017: Career Achievement Award from the Inter-University Seminar on Armed Forces and Society.
- 2015: Marcy Crowley Award for Service to the Section for Women and Public Administration, American Society for Public Administration.
- 2010: Everette Swinney Teaching Award, Texas State University Faculty Senate.
- 2007: Laverne Burchfield Award for the best review essay, Public Administration Review.
- 2006: Professor of the Year, Central Texas Chapter of the American Society for Public Administration.
- 2002: Leslie A. Whittington Excellence in Teaching Award, National Association of Schools of Public Affairs and Administration.
- 2001: Presidential Award for Excellence in Teaching, Texas State University.
- 1984: Texas State Presidential Seminar research award.
- Rita Mae Kelly Award, American Society for Public Administration.
- Fellow of the National Academy of Public Administration.

== Selected publications ==
=== Books ===
- Shields, Patricia (2006-01-30). Dollar, Doug (ed.). STEP by STEP: Building a Research Paper. New Forums Press. ISBN 978-1-58107-117-7. OCLC 166264582.
- Shields, Patricia M.; Rangarajan, Nandhini (2013). A playbook for research methods: integrating conceptual frameworks and project management. New Forums scholarly writing series. Stillwater, OK: New Forum Press. ISBN 978-1-58107-247-1.
- Soeters, J.; Shields, Patricia M.; Rietjens, S. J. H., eds. (2014). Routledge handbook of research methods in military studies. Routledge handbooks. London ; New York: Routledge/Taylor & Francis Group. doi:10.4324/9780203093801. ISBN 978-0-415-63533-2.
- Shields, Patricia M. (2017), "Jane Addams: Pioneer in American Sociology, Social Work and Public Administration", Pioneers in Arts, Humanities, Science, Engineering, Practice, Cham: Springer International Publishing, pp. 43–67, doi:10.1007/978-3-319-50646-3_4, ISBN 978-3-319-50644-9
- Shields, Patricia M.; Elias, Nicole M., eds. (2022). Handbook on gender and public administration. Elgar handbooks in public administration and management. Cheltenham, UK ; Northhampton, MA, USA: Edward Elgar Publishing Limited. ISBN 978-1-78990-472-7.
- Shields, Patricia M.; Hamington, Maurice; Soeters, Joseph, eds. (2022-02-14). The Oxford Handbook of Jane Addams. Oxford University Press. doi:10.1093/oxfordhb/9780197544518.001.0001. ISBN 978-0-19-754451-8.

=== Selected articles and chapters ===
- Shields, Patricia M. (1996). "Pragmatism". Administration & Society. 28 (3): 390–411. doi:10.1177/009539979602800305. ISSN 0095-3997.
- Shields, Patricia M. (2003). "The Community of Inquiry". Administration & Society. 35 (5): 510–538. doi:10.1177/0095399703256160. ISSN 0095-3997.
- Shields, Patricia M. (2008-02-08). "Rediscovering the Taproot: Is Classical Pragmatism the Route to Renew Public Administration?". Public Administration Review. 68 (2): 205–221. doi:10.1111/j.1540-6210.2007.00856.x. ISSN 0033-3352.
- Casula, Mattia; Rangarajan, Nandhini; Shields, Patricia (2020-12-08). "The potential of working hypotheses for deductive exploratory research". Quality & Quantity. 55 (5): 1703–1725. doi:10.1007/s11135-020-01072-9. ISSN 0033-5177. PMC 7722257. PMID 33311812.
- Shields, Patricia M. (2022-02-14), "Jane Addams and Public Administration", The Oxford Handbook of Jane Addams, Oxford University Press, pp. 305–326, doi:10.1093/oxfordhb/9780197544518.013.3, ISBN 978-0-19-754451-8
- M. Shields, Patricia (2022-02-15), "The origins of the settlement model of public administration: stories of women pioneers", Handbook on Gender and Public Administration, Edward Elgar Publishing, doi:10.4337/9781789904734.00011, ISBN 978-1-78990-473-4
- Shields, Patricia M. (2020), "Dynamic Intersection of Military and Society", Handbook of Military Sciences, Cham: Springer International Publishing, pp. 1–23, doi:10.1007/978-3-030-02866-4_31-1, ISBN 978-3-030-02866-4
