= Hal G. Rainey =

American public administration professor

Hal Griffin Rainey (born July 23, 1946) is a professor of public administration and policy at the University of Georgia School of Public and International Affairs. He is known for his studies of organizations.

== Career ==
Rainey obtained a bachelor's in English and psychology from the University of North Carolina at Chapel Hill, after which he served as an officer in the United States Navy. He then obtained a master's in psychology and a Ph.D. in public administration from Ohio State University. Between 1977 and 1987 he was on the faculty of Florida State University. Since 1988 he has been a professor at the University of Georgia, and currently holds the title of Alumni Foundation Distinguished Professor.

== Selected awards and honors ==
- Charles Levine Memorial Award, American Society for Public Administration and National Association of Schools of Public Affairs and Administration, 1995
- Fellow, National Academy of Public Administration, 2003
- Award for Excellence in Teaching, School of Public and International Affairs, University of Georgia, 2005
- Dwight Waldo Award, American Society for Public Administration, 2009
- John Gaus Award, American Political Science Association, 2011

== Selected publications ==
- Rainey, Hal G.; Backoff, Robert W.; Levine, Charles H. (1976). "Comparing Public and Private Organizations". Public Administration Review. 36 (2): 233–244. CiteSeerX 10.1.1.135.7682. doi:10.2307/975145. JSTOR 975145.
- Rainey, Hal G. (1979). "Perceptions of Incentives in Business and Government: Implications for Civil Service Reform". Public Administration Review. 39 (5): 440–448. doi:10.2307/3109918. JSTOR 3109918.
- Rainey, Hal G. (1982). "Reward Preferences among Public and Private Managers: In Search of the Service Ethic". American Review of Public Administration. 16 (4): 288–302. doi:10.1177/027507408201600402. S2CID 154095194.
- Rainey, Hal G. (1983). "Public Agencies and Private Firms: Incentive Structures, Goals, and Individual Roles". Administration & Society. 15 (2): 207–242. doi:10.1177/009539978301500203. S2CID 145693466.
- Perry, James L.; Rainey, Hal G. (1988). "The Public-Private Distinction in Organization Theory: A Critique and Research Strategy". Academy of Management Review. 13 (2): 182¬201. doi:10.2307/258571. JSTOR 258571.
- Rainey, Hal G.; Pandey, Sanjay; Bozeman, Barry (1995). "Research Note: Public and Private Managers' Perceptions of Red Tape". Public Administration Review. 55 (6): 567–574. doi:10.2307/3110348. JSTOR 3110348.
- Rainey, Hal G.; Steinbauer, Paula (1999). "Galloping Elephants: Developing Elements of a Theory of Effective Government Organizations". Journal of Public Administration Research and Theory. 9 (1): 1–32. doi:10.1093/oxfordjournals.jpart.a024401. JSTOR 1181850.
- Rainey, Hal G.; Bozeman, Barry (2000). "Comparing Public and Private Organizations: Empirical Research and the Power of the A Priori". Journal of Public Administration Research and Theory. 10 (2): 447–470. doi:10.1093/oxfordjournals.jpart.a024276. JSTOR 3525651.
- Brudney, Jeffrey L.; O'Toole, Laurence J.; Rainey, Hal G., eds. (2000). Advancing Public Management: New Developments in Theory, Methods, and Practice. Washington, DC: Georgetown University Press. ISBN 978-0878407606.
- Fernandez, Sergio; Rainey, Hal G. (2006). "Managing Successful Organizational Change in the Public Sector". Public Administration Review. 66 (2): 168–176. CiteSeerX 10.1.1.461.2900. doi:10.1111/j.1540-6210.2006.00570.x.
- Park, Sung Min; Rainey, Hal G. (2008). "Leadership and Public Service Motivation in U.S. Federal Agencies". International Public Management Journal. 11: 109–142. doi:10.1080/10967490801887954. S2CID 145166308.
- Rainey, Hal G. (2009). Understanding and Managing Public Organizations (4th ed.). San Francisco: Jossey-Bass. ISBN 9780470402924.
