= Sung Deuk Hahm =

South Korean professor

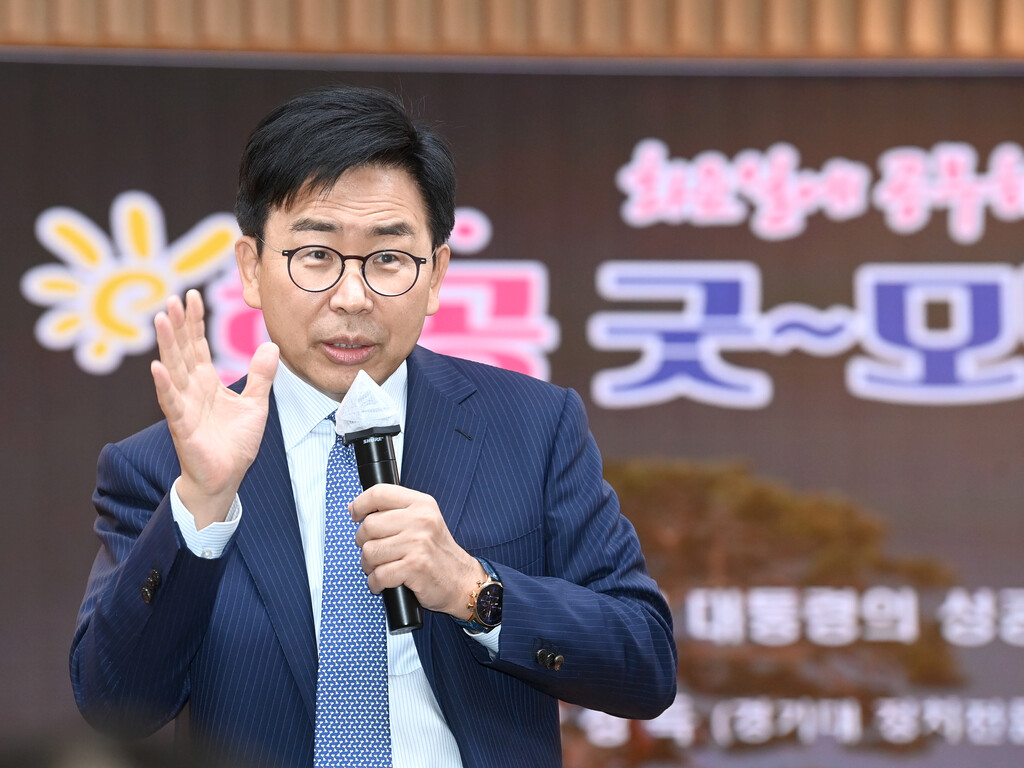

Personal details
- Born: March 4, 1963 (age 63) Yecheon, Gyeongsangbuk-do; South Korea
- Education: Carnegie Mellon University (Ph.D. in Political Economy); University of Texas at Austin (MA in Public Affairs); Yonsei University (BA in Political Science and International Studies)
- Profession: Professor

Korean name
- Hangul: 함성득
- Hanja: 咸成得
- RR: Ham Seongdeuk
- MR: Ham Sŏngdŭk

Sung Deuk Hahm (Korean: 함성득) is Executive Vice President of the Seoul Campus and Naun Chair Professor of Political Science and Law at Kyonggi University, where he was Dean (2021-2026) of the Graduate School of Political Studies. Concurrently, he is a co-chairman of the advisory committee of the World Gyeongju Forum (WGF), a follow up platform of the APEC (Asia-Pacific Economic Cooperation) South Korea 2025.

He is a Korean political scientist, well known for his work on the Korean Presidency. He has been a friend and adviser to every president from current Lee Jae-myung to Chun Doo-hwan. He is also the chairman (2002–present) of the Korean Institute for Presidential Studies, an independent research foundation which evaluates the presidential performance and the editor-in-chief (1999–present) of the Korean Presidential Studies Series of the Nanam Publishing House.

== Education and Honors ==
He received his BA in political science and international studies from Yonsei University with highest honors in 1985 and MA in public affairs from the University of Texas at Austin with the Lyndon B. Johnson Foundation Academic Excellence Award in 1989. He was a member of Phi Kappa Phi honor society. He received his Ph.D. in political economy from Carnegie Mellon University with the guidance of Nobel Laureate Herbert Simon in 1993.

During the completion of his dissertation, he was an assistant professor of public administration of the John D. Rockefeller IV School of Policy and Politics at West Virginia University as well as a research associate at the Ronald Reagan Presidential Center for Public Affairs. He received the Raymond Vernon Memorial Award (with Mark Kamlet and David Mowery) for the best article in the 1992 Journal of Policy Analysis and Management. He also received the Outstanding Dissertation Award from the Network of Schools of Public Policy, Affairs, and Administration (NASPAA) in 1993.

== Career ==
After receiving his Ph.D. in 1993, he became an assistant professor of public policy and business administration of the McCourt School of Public Policy and the McDonough School of Business at Georgetown University. He was a Program Chair of the 1997 Annual Conference of the American Society of Public Administration.

Since returning to South Korea in 1997, he has been Professor and Chairman of the Department of Public Administration, Associate Dean of the College of Political Science and Economics, and Director of the Korea University-Bar-Ilan University of Israel program at Korea University. In 2021, he has been named the 16th Dean of the Graduate School of Political Studies at Kyonggi University. He was also appointed as the Naun Professor of Political Science and Law, a chair awarded by the Naun Foundation (Kim & Chang, the largest law firm in Korea) to Kyonggi University in 2023.

Professionally, he is currently the Special Advisor (2022–present) to Governor Lee Cheol-woo of the North Gyeongsang Province. He was the APEC Korea 2025 Ambassador for the North Gyeongsang Province. He is also a member of executive board of TriGem Computer Co., Ltd. (2014–present). He was a member of executive board of the Korea Land & Housing Corporation (2007-2013), the largest public corporation in Asia.

In addition, he was a founding executive director (2023–2024) of the Incheon Security Conference (ISC) of the Incheon Metropolitan City. The purpose of ISC is to commemorate the victory of the Incheon Landing Operation, also known as Operation Chromite in September 15, 1950. He was also a member (2023–2024) of the Special Committee for the Constitutional Revision at the Korean National Assembly.

== Research area ==
His research interests are in the areas of Korean Presidency, Korean politics, international political economy, public budgeting and finance, and industrial policy. He has published 18 books and over 150 articles in edited volumes and scholarly journals such as Comparative Politics, Comparative Political Studies, Journal of Public Administration Research and Theory, and Public Administration Review.

He was the editor-in-chief of Korean Social Science Journal (Springer) (2013-2014) published by the Korean Social Science Research Council, Korea Journal (2013-2014) published by the UNESCO-Korea Commission, and International Review of Public Administration (Taylor & Francis) (2004-2005) published by the Korean Association of Public Administration. He was a co-editor of International Public Management Journal (Taylor & Francis) (2008-2014), an associate editor of Administration & Society (2008-2014), and the managing editor of Governance (journal) (1995-1997). Currently, he is a member of the editorial boards of Governance (journal) (2015–present; 2006-2008) and Korea Observer (2022–present).

== Selected publications ==
=== Books ===
- Presidential Crisis in Korea. Seoul: Cheong Media, 2024.ISBN 9791187861683
- The End of Imperial President in Korea. Seoul: Sum & Sum, 2017.ISBN 9788997454228
- The Korean Presidency (3rd ed.). Seoul: Nanam Publishing House, 2016; 2002; 1999.ISBN 9788930036634; Outstanding Academic Book Award, Korean National Academy of Sciences, 2002

=== Articles ===
- "Comparative Analysis of Soft Power Between South Korea and the United States: A Theoretical Mechanism Approach" 2025. Journal of Asian and African Affairs 60(1): 157-178 (with Uk Heo and Sooho Song).
- "Affective Polarization in the 2022 South Korean Presidential Election: Causes and Consequences" 2024. Korea Observer 55(2): 273-296 (with Hyunki Shin and Jae-won Yang)
- "President Moon Jae-in at Midterm: What Affects Public Support for Moon Jae-in?" 2020. Journal of Asian and African Affairs 55(8): 1128-1142 (with Uk Heo).
- "The First Female President in South Korea: Park Geun-hye's Leadership and South Korean Democracy." 2018. Journal of Asian and African Affairs 53(5): 649-665 (with Uk Heo).
