= John Glenn College of Public Affairs =

Public policy school of Ohio State University

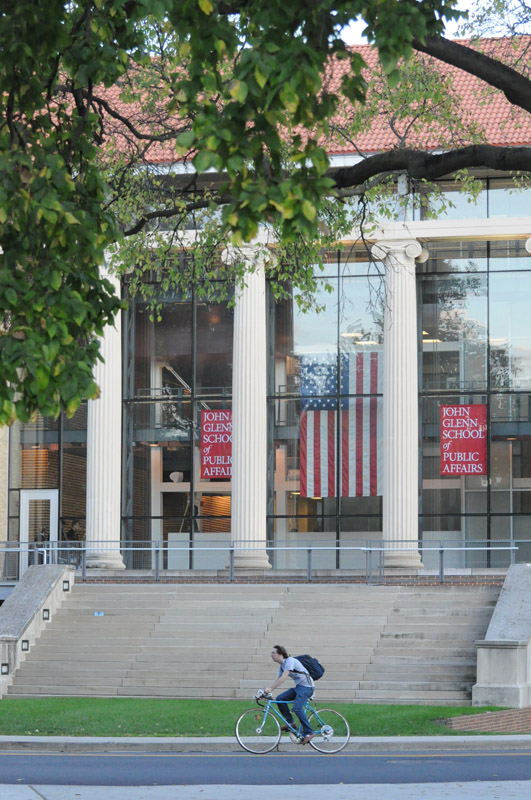
- Type: Public
- Established: 2006
- Dean: Stephanie Moulton (interim)
- Faculty: 28
- Students: 600+
- Location: Columbus, Ohio, USA; 39°59′57″N 83°00′35″W
- Campus: Urban
- Website: glenn.osu.edu

The John Glenn College of Public Affairs is a public policy and management school at Ohio State University. The Glenn College offers undergraduate, graduate and doctoral programs in public affairs. The Glenn College provides research, training and technical assistance to state, public and nonprofit organizations. The college is named after United States Senator and astronaut John Glenn. On January 30, 2015, the Ohio State University Board of Trustees approved a change of status of the former John Glenn School of Public Affairs making the new John Glenn College of Public Affairs the 15th college at The Ohio State University.

== History ==
The school officially was formed through a June 30, 2006 merger of the John Glenn Institute and the university's School of Public Policy and Management. The John Glenn Institute was founded in 1998 as a public service, research, and professional development institute. The School of Public Policy and Management was a part of the College of Commerce, then College of Social and Behavioral Sciences after its 1969 founding.

The Glenn College is home to the Battelle Center for Science & Technology Policy and the Ohio Education Research Center. The college has a Washington, D.C. office that works with government agencies and NGOs and is the headquarters of the college's Washington Academic Internship Program.

== Academics ==
According to the U.S. News & World Report in 2020, the Glenn College is ranked No. 13 among the 290 public affairs schools nationwide and No. 1 in Ohio. Additionally, six of the College's graduate specialties have been ranked in the top 10% by U.S. News & World Report. These specialties are Nonprofit Management (No. 13), Public Management and Leadership (No. 7), Urban Policy (No. 18), Public Policy Analysis (No. 22), Public Budgeting and Finance (No. 23), and Environmental Policy and Management (No. 14). The Glenn College is also ranked No. 6 internationally in Public Administration, according to the Academic Ranking of World Universities in 2020.

== Students ==
According to the College, approximately 600 students participate in the Glenn College. Students of the Master's degree programs in 2018 were about 51% males and 49% females, with Underrepresented minorities making up nearly 21%. The Undergraduate degree programs have an underrepresented minority rate of 25%. The average GPA of the graduate admissions is 3.6.

== Degrees offered ==
=== Undergraduate ===
The college offers a Bachelor of Arts in Public Management, Leadership, and Policy and a Bachelor of Science in Public Policy Analysis.

=== Graduate ===
The college offers a Master of Arts in Public Policy and Management and Master of Public Administration (MPA), and a Doctor of Philosophy (PhD) in Public Policy and Management.

== Page Hall ==
The Glenn College is located in Page Hall, a building initially opened in 1903 and occupied by the law school, the business school, offices of the Ohio Department of Health, the old College of Commerce and Journalism (the school of public administration that is a component of the John Glenn School was part of the College of Commerce), and the College of Music.

The predecessor John Glenn Institute moved into Page Hall after its 2003–2005 renovation. The $16 million renovation gutted the interior, leaving only the facade. A crowd of nearly 500 watched the rededication on March 3, 2005, with speeches delivered by former Senator John Glenn, Columbus Mayor Michael B. Coleman, Ohio Supreme Court Chief Justice Thomas J. Moyer, Ohio State President Karen A. Holbrook and Tami Longaberger, chair of the Ohio State Board of Trustees.

== Alumni ==
There are over 3,000 graduates of the school's various degree programs. The following is a list of some notable graduates.

- Sherrod Brown, U.S. Senator (MPA 1981)
- Michael R. White, Former Mayor Cleveland, Ohio
- Glenn Hahn Cope, Provost and Vice Chancellor for Academic Affairs at University of Missouri–St. Louis, former President of the American Society for Public Administration (2002-2003), and former Vice Dean of the Lyndon B. Johnson School of Public Affairs (Ph.D.)
- Dan Crippen, former Director of the Congressional Budget Office (1999-2003) (M.A. 1976; Ph.D. 1981)
- H. Brinton Milward, Associate Dean and Director of the School of Public Administration and Policy at the Eller College of Management, University of Arizona (M.A. 1973, Ph.D. 1978)
- Hal G. Rainey, Alumni Foundation Distinguished Professor, Department of Public Administration and Policy at The University of Georgia (Ph.D. 1978)
- Paolo DeMaria, Ohio Superintendent of Public Instruction (MPA 1996)
