= Jack W. Meek =

Jack Wayne Meek
- Education: Professor

Jack Wayne Meek (born November 22, 1952) is University of La Verne Academy Professor and professor emeritus of Public Administration at the College of Law and Public Service at the University of La Verne, where he previously served as Director of Center Research for the College of Business and Public Management. He currently offers an annual lecture for Public Service and Law Students at the University of La Verne.

Meek offered courses in research methods and collaborative public management. His research focuses on metropolitan governance including the emergence of administrative connections and relationships in local government, regional collaboration and partnerships, policy networks and citizen engagement.

== Education ==
Meek holds a Bachelor of Science in History and Political Science from the University of La Verne (1975) and a Ph.D. in International Relations from the Claremont Graduate University (1980). Meek has participated in summer institutes at the University of Michigan (1977), Miami University at Oxford, Ohio (1995), and conducted sabbatical work at Boston University (1999). Meek attended the New England Institute for Complexity Studies (2014).

== Research ==
Meek has edited a book on Collaborative Public Management and co-edited four books focusing on modern networks, business improvement districts, intergovernmental relations, and complex governance systems. Meek also co-authored a book on governance networks. Meek has published one hundred articles in numerous publications and academic journals and serves on the editorial boards of Complexity, Governance and Networks, Journal of Globalization Studies, and Forum for Social Economics and Social Agenda. Professor Meek's dissertation research was on international energy cooperation among members of the International Energy Agency (1980).

== Professional service ==
Meek served as President of the Network of Schools of Public Policy, Affairs, and Administration (NASPAA) from October 2017 through October 2018, and continued to serve as Past-President through October 2019. Meek has served in other roles for NASPAA including serving on the NASPAA Commission of Peer Review and Assessment (COPRA, 2005–2008), Chair of the NASPAA Standards Committee (2010–2016), Chair of the NASPAA Annual Conference held in Austin, Texas (2012) and Chair of the Accreditation Self-Study Instructions Task Force (2008–2009). Since 2010, Meek served as chair on numerous accreditation visits nationally and internationally for NASPAA. Meek has also served as Chair of the Section on Intergovernmental Administration and Management (SIAM) and executive committee of the Section on Complexity and Network Studies (SCNS) for the American Society for Public Administration (ASPA). Meek also served on the Council for the Southern California Chapter of the American Society for Public Administration.

== Academic positions ==
Meek was assistant professor of History and Political Science at Manchester University (Indiana) from 1980 – 1985. Meek held the positions of Associate Professor (1985–2001) Professor of Public Administration at the University of La Verne (2001 - 2021) and professor emeritus at the College of Law and Public Service at the University of La Verne (2021 - Current).

Meek was visiting scholar at the University of Southern California working with the Civic Engagement Initiative (2003 – 2006), Visiting professor of government at Claremont McKenna College (2006 – 2013), was the CAPES Foreign Visiting professor at the Universidade Estadual do Norte Fluminense, Brazil (2007), and the visiting professor of Research at Erasmus University, Netherlands (2015).

== Administrative experience ==
Meek served as Director, Center for Research, College of Business and Public Management, University of La Verne (2015 – 2021); Previously he was Director, Master of Public Administration Program (2008 – 2015). University of La Verne; Coordinating Dean, School of Public Affairs and Health Administration (SPAHA) 2000 – 2003, and Chair of the Department of Public Administration (1988 – 2002) University of La Verne.

== Awards and honors ==
- In 2016, Meek was named One of 125 Most Influential Individuals, University of La Verne 125th Anniversary.
- In 2015, Meek was awarded the Harry Scoville Award for Academic Excellence from the Southern California Chapter of the American Society for Public Administration.
- At the University of La Verne, Meek has been recognized with the Ellsworth Johnson Service Award, University of La Verne (2011); as a Fellow, University of La Verne Academy, University of La Verne (2010); and with the Excellence in Teaching Award, University of La Verne (1995).

== Fellowships ==
- Foreign Visiting Fellow CAPES Program, Universidade Estadual do Norte Fluminense, Brasil (2007)
- Futures Project Fellow, Irvine Foundation (1995–1997)
- Earhart Foundation fellow (Claremont Graduate University) (1976–1978)

== Community service ==
- Advisory Board Member, The Terrence E. Deal Leadership Institute, University of La Verne (2011–Present)
- Advisory Board Member, Claremont Local Grown Power (2016–present)
- Board President, Hillcrest Retirement Community (2015–2016), La Verne, CA, Member of Executive Committee (2014–2018) and board member (2010–2013)
- Citizen Review Committee on Sustainability, City of Claremont, CA (2008–2017)
- Mayor Ad Hoc Citizen Advisory Board for Economic Sustainability, City of Claremont, CA (2010–2011)
- City of Claremont Sustainability Task Force (2007–2008)
- ULV Representative, City of La Verne Housing Element Task Force (2007–2008)
- Legislative committee, San Gabriel Valley Economic Partnership (1999–present)
- Board member, Institute for Community Leadership, a partnership program with the University of La Verne, Citrus Valley Health Partners, UCLA, and Immaculate Heart College (1999–2001)

== Selected publications ==
=== Books ===
- Robyn Keast, Joris Voets, Jack Wayne Meek and Christine Flynn, Editors (2023). A Guide to Modern Networks. Edward Elgar Publishers. ISBN 978-1-80088-397-0
- Jack Wayne Meek, Editor (2021) Handbook of Collaborative Public Management. Edward Elgar Publisher. ISBN 978-1-78990-190-0
- Jack W. Meek and Kevin S. Marshall. Eds. (2014) Administrative Strategies for Complex Governance Systems: Challenges of Making Public Administration and Complexity Theory Work – COMPACT II. Emergent Publication. ISBN 978-1-938158-15-5.
- Jack W. Meek and Kurt Thurmaier, Eds. (2012) Networked Governance: The Future of Intergovernmental Management. CQ Press. ISBN 9781452203256
- Christopher Koliba, Jack W. Meek, Asim Zia (2011) Governance Networks in Public Administration and Public Policy. New York: CRC Press, Taylor & Francis Group.
- Goktug Morcol, Lorlene Hoyt, Jack W. Meek and Ulf Zimmerman, Eds. (2008) Business Improvement Districts: Research, Theories, and Controversies. Public Administration and Public Policy Series, Auerbach Publications of Taylor & Francis.
- Jack W. Meek. (1980) The Limits of Collective Action: A Collective Goods Interpretation of Energy Cooperation Among Western Industrialized Countries in the International Energy Agency. Ann Arbor: University Microfilms International.

=== Symposia and special issues ===
- Jack W. Meek and Kevin S. Marshall, Eds. (2014), Informed Governance: Complexity and the Commons. Complexity, Governance and Networks. VOl.1, Issue 2. doi:10.7564/14-CGN15
- Jack W. Meek, Guest Editor (2014), Symposium - Complexity Theory and Administrative Learning: Adaptive Practices in Complex Governance Systems. Emergence: Complexity and Organization
- Matthew T. Witt, Jack W. Meek and Suzanne Beaumaster, Co-Editors (2012), “Symposium: Integrity in Public Administration,” Journal of Public Integrity, Vol. 14, No. 3, Summer 2012, pp. 225–298.
- Jack W. Meek, Guest Editor (2010), Symposium - Complexity Theory for Public Administration and Policy, Vol. 12, Issue 1, for the Journal Emergence: Complexity and Organization.
