= Social equity =

Sociology principle

Social equity holds that social policy should be based on the principle of substantive equality. Since the 1960s, the political principle of social equity has been used in a variety of institutional contexts, including education and public administration.

Social equity is different from the social equality principle based on formal equality of opportunity. For example, providing hearing aids for the deaf would be considered social equity as it furthers the ability of people to equally partake in society, whereas if they received no aid, they would be treated completely equally to others, but they would not have these opportunities.

== Overview ==
Definitions of social equity differ, but they all emphasize justice and fairness. Equity includes the role of public administrators, who are tasked with ensuring that social services are distributed fairly. This means considering historical and current inequalities among groups, as fairness is influenced by this social and historical context.

== In public administration ==
Attention to social equity in the field of public administration in the United States arose during the 1960s, amid growing national awareness of civil rights and racial inequality. (Note: See also Riccucci, N.M. 2021. Managing Diversity in Public Sector Workforces. New York: Routledge.)

The National Academy of Public Administration defines social equity as "The fair, just and equitable management of all institutions serving the public directly or by contract; the fair, just and equitable distribution of public services and implementation of public policy; and the commitment to promote fairness, justice, and equity in the formation of public policy."

In 1968, H. George Frederickson articulated "a theory of social equity" and put it forward as the 'third pillar' of public administration. Frederickson was concerned that those in public administration were making the mistake of assuming that citizen A is the same as citizen B, ignoring social and economic conditions. His goal was for social equity to take on the same "status as economy and efficiency as values or principles to which public administration should adhere."

Community policing is one approach towards social equity in policing.

== Sex, gender and sexuality ==
Sex equity refers to social equity in relation to the sex assigned an individual at birth whilst gender equity refers to social equity in relation to the gender a person identifies as. Sex and gender equity include creating a fairer system for individuals that are female, transgender, nonbinary, cisgender, or other gender-diverse identities.

Sexual equity refers to social equity in relation to the sexuality a person identifies as. Sexual equity includes creating a fairer system for individuals whose sexual orientations fall outside of the heterosexual viewpoint such as lesbian, gay, bisexual, asexual, and other queer identities.

In January 2026, the United Nations posted a report detailing that worldwide women have 64% the amount of rights as men and 54% of nations do not have consent as a legal aspect of rape.

Since the beginning of 2025, the United States of America has taken a stance against "gender ideology."Since this began, global programs that supported LGBTQ communities have abruptly ended, funding for hundreds of research grants for LGBTQ health studies has been cut, and executive orders have been made targeting legislation and initiatives that protect and support LGBTQ Americans.

== Race ==
Racial and race equity refers to social equity in relation to an individuals race and culture. Racial and race equity includes creating a fairer system for people of a racial minority in a given group, institution, nation, or area.

Within the realm of public administration, racial equity is an important factor. Schools, public infrastructure, and institutions often attempt racial equity but fall short in protecting the minority.

In the United States of America, recent legislation in 2025 ordered the ending of diversity, equity, and inclusion- or DEI- programs. This legislation terminated offices and positions related to DEI along with environmental protective programs; employees connected to DEI and environmental programs; and programs, acts, and grants given that are related to equity.

== Religion ==
Social equity regarding religion has legal protections in some jurisdictions. In the US, individuals, regardless of religious affiliation or practice are afforded. According to 42 U.S.C. sect. 2000e(j) "Religion is defined as all aspects of religious observance and practice, as well as belief, unless an employer demonstrates that he is unable to responsibly accommodate to an employee's or prospective employee's religious observance or practice without unique hardship to the conduct of the employer's business." This law was enacted to protect employees who are employed by bosses of another religion and allow them to observe their particular religious practices and celebrations.

== Military ==
Military and conscription generally violate social equity, despite increasing social inclusion. Women in Norway did not reach gender equity for conscription with women being only 33% of all conscripted as of 2020. The United States military casualties of war and mental health outcomes show racial and gender equity disparities, in the period 1980-2022 African Americans were over-represented and women were underrepresented in casualties.

== Education ==
Educational equity, also known as equity in education, is a measure of equity in education. Educational equity depends on two main factors. The first is distributive justice, which implies that factors specific to one's personal conditions should not interfere with the potential of academic success. The second factor is inclusion, which refers to a comprehensive standard that applies to everyone in a certain education system. These two factors are closely related and depend on each other for an educational system's success. Education equity can include the study of excellence and equity.

== Health ==
Health equity is social equity in health. Disparities in health outcomes can be related to differences in access to social determinants of health, specifically from wealth, power and prestige. Individuals who have consistently been deprived of these three determinants are significantly disadvantaged from health inequities, and face worse health outcomes than those who are able to access certain resources. This is especially important in areas with increased diversity across social, ethnic, and racial groups, as underrepresentation in healthcare systems is a global issue. In order to achieve health equity, resources must be allocated based on an individual need-based principle.

== See also ==
- Affirmative action – Policies aiming to increase inclusion of people from marginalized groups
- Diversity, equity, and inclusion – Organizational frameworks and programs
- Identity politics – Politics based on one's identity
- Intergenerational equity – Concept of fairness or justice between generations
- Intersectionality – Theory of discrimination
- Reverse discrimination – Discrimination against members of a dominant or majority group
- Sentencing disparity – Form of unequal treatment
- Social equality – Equality for all people within society
- Social justice – Concept in political philosophy
- Social privilege – Theory of advantage or entitlement
- Medical Algorithms – Form of incorporating diverse backgrounds into evolving health technologies
