= Pragma =

Pragma may refer to:

- Pragma (Greek: πράγμα), business, deed or act; see Pragmatism
- Directive (programming), known as a pragma or pragmat in several programming languages
  - #pragma (CPP)
    - #pragma once
- Pragma (love), a model of love
- Pragma (album), a 1998 album by Tim Hodgkinson

== See also ==
- Pragmatism (disambiguation)
