= Presidential system =

Form of government

World's states colored by systems of government: Parliamentary systems: Head of government is elected or nominated by and accountable to the legislature. Constitutional monarchy with a ceremonial monarch Semi-constitutional monarchy: Monarch holds significant executive or legislative power but is still restricted by the constitution. Parliamentary republic with a ceremonial president Parliamentary republic with an executive president Presidential system: Head of government (president) is popularly elected and independent of the legislature. Presidential republic Theocratic presidential republic: Supreme leader is highest authority; popularly elected president still exists. Hybrid systems: Semi-presidential republic: Executive president is independent of the legislature; head of government is appointed by the president and is accountable to the legislature. Assembly-independent republic: Head of government (president or directory) is elected by the legislature, but is not accountable to it. Other systems: Islamic theocracy: Supreme leader holds unlimited political and religious power; state and faith are a single institution. Absolute monarchy: Monarch has unlimited power. One-party state: Power is constitutionally linked to a single political party. Provisional government: Current regime is temporary or transitional; no permanent constitution. Military junta: Committee of military leaders controls the government; constitutional provisions are suspended. Places without governments. Note: this chart represents the de jure systems of government, not the de facto degree of democracy.

A presidential system, or single-executive system (sometimes also congressional system) is a form of government in which a head of government (usually titled "president") heads an executive branch that derives its authority and legitimacy from a source that is separate from the legislative branch. The system was popularized by its inclusion in the Constitution of the United States.

This head of government is often also the head of state. In a presidential system, the head of government is directly or indirectly elected by a group of citizens and is not responsible to the legislature, and the legislature cannot dismiss the president during their term in office except in extraordinary cases. A presidential system contrasts with a parliamentary system, where the head of government (usually called a prime minister) derives their power from the confidence of an elected legislature, which can dismiss the prime minister with an ordinary majority. However, dictators or leaders of one-party states, whether popularly elected or not, often carry the title of president.

== History ==
=== Development in the Americas ===
The presidential system has its roots in the governance of the British colonies of the 17th century in what is now the United States. The Pilgrims, permitted to govern themselves in Plymouth Colony, established a system that utilized an independent executive branch. Each year, a governor was chosen by the colonial legislature, as well as several assistants, analogous to modern-day cabinets. Additional executive officials such as constables and messengers were then appointed. At the same time, the British Isles underwent a brief period of republicanism as the Protectorate, during which the Lord Protector served as an executive leader similar to a president.

The first true presidential system was developed during the United States Constitutional Convention in 1787. Drawing inspiration from the previous colonial governments, from English Common Law, and from philosophers such as John Locke and Montesquieu, the delegates developed what is now known as the presidential system. Most notably, James Wilson advocated for a unitary executive figure that would become the role of the president.

During the 1810s and 1820s, Spanish colonies in the Americas sought independence, and several new Spanish-speaking governments emerged in Latin America. These countries modeled their constitutions after that of the United States, and the presidential system became the dominant political system in the Americas. Following several decades of monarchy, Brazil also adopted the presidential system in 1889 with Deodoro da Fonseca as its first president. Latin American presidential systems have experienced varying levels of stability, with many experiencing periods of dictatorial rule.

=== As a global system ===
The end of World War II established presidential systems in two countries. After the United States ended the Japanese occupation of Korea, it assisted South Korea in the formation of a presidential government. However, the early years of the South Korean presidency were marked by dictatorial control. At the same time, Indonesia declared independence from the Netherlands in 1945. While it nominally used a presidential system, it was in effect a dictatorship where the president controlled all branches of government. A democratic presidential system was established in Indonesia in 1998 and in Korea in 1987. Cyprus, the Maldives, and South Vietnam also adopted the presidential system following decolonization. Pakistan and Bangladesh did so as well, but they changed their governmental systems shortly afterwards.

Several more countries adopted the presidential system in the final decades of the 20th century. A modified version of the presidential system was implemented in Iran following constitutional reform in 1989, in which the Supreme Leader serves as the head of state and is the absolute power in this country. In 1981, Palau achieved independence and adopted a presidential system. When the Soviet Union was dissolved in 1991, the presidential system was adopted by the new states that were created, though most of them adopted other governmental systems over the following decades.

The presidential system continues to be adopted in the 21st century. Following its independence in 2011, South Sudan adopted a presidential system. In 2018, after the 2017 Turkish constitutional referendum, Turkey adopted a presidential system. In 2025, following the adoption of the Constitutional Declaration, Syria established a presidential system.

== Features ==
=== Separation of powers ===
The presidential system is defined by the separation of the executive branch from other aspects of government. The head of government is elected to work alongside, but not as a part of, the legislature. There are several types of powers that are traditionally delegated to the president. Under a presidential system, the president may have the power to challenge legislation through a veto, the power to pardon crimes, authority over foreign policy, authority to command the military as the Commander-in-chief, and authority over advisors and employees of the executive branch.

==== Checks and balances ====
Separation of powers is sometimes held up as an advantage, in that each branch may scrutinize the actions of the other. This is in contrast with a parliamentary system, where the majority party in the legislature that also serves as the executive is unlikely to scrutinize its actions. Writing about the Watergate scandal, former British MP Woodrow Wyatt said, "Don't think a Watergate couldn't happen here, you just wouldn't hear about it." The extent of this effect is debated. Some commentators argue that the effect is mitigated when the president's party is in power, while others note that party discipline is not as strictly enforced in presidential systems.

==== James Wilson's theories ====
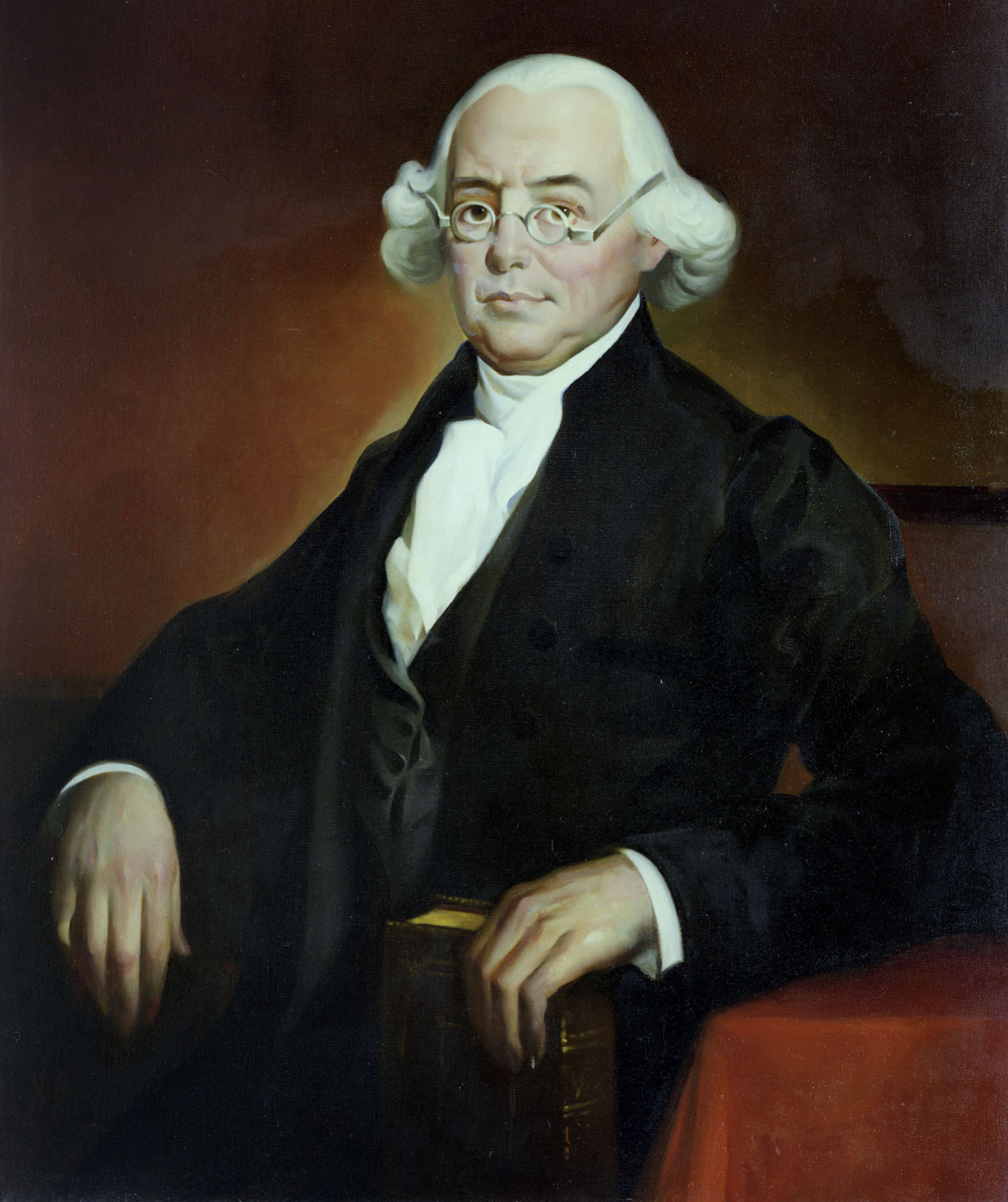
Portrait of James Wilson, who largely designed the powers of the president of the United States.

James Wilson, who advocated for a presidential system at the constitutional convention, maintained that a single chief executive would provide for greater public accountability than a group and thereby protect against tyranny by making it plain who was responsible for executive actions. He also submitted that a singular chief executive was necessary to ensure promptness and consistency and guard against deadlock, which could be essential in times of national emergency.

Presidential systems are largely able to avoid cabinet crises, due to a unitary executive being solely responsible for running the government. This was highlighted by James Wilson, who is quoted below.

The executive as well as the legislative power ought to be restrained. ... The restraints on the legislative authority, must from its nature, be chiefly internal; that is, they must proceed from some part or division of itself. But the restraints on the executive power are external. These restraints are applied with the greatest certainty, and with greatest efficacy, when the object of restraint is clearly ascertained. This is best done, when one object only, distinguished and responsible, is conspicuously held up to the view and examination of the publick [sic]. . . . In planning, forming and arranging laws, deliberation is always becoming, and always useful. But in the active scenes of government, there are emergencies, in which the man, as, in other cases, the women [sic], who deliberates is lost. Secrecy may be equally necessary as dispatch. But, can either secrecy or dispatch be expected, when, to every enterprise, mutual communication, mutual consultation, and mutual agreement among men, perhaps of discordant views, of discordant tempers, and of discordant interests, are indispensably necessary? How much time will be consumed! and when it is consumed, how little business will be done! When the time is elapsed; when the business is finished; when the state is in distress, perhaps on the verge of destruction; on whom shall we fix the blame? Whom shall we select as the object of punishment?

— James Wilson

==== Efficiencies and inefficiencies ====
When an action is within the scope of a president's power, a presidential system can respond more rapidly to emerging situations than a parliamentary system. A prime minister, when taking action, needs to retain the support of the legislature, but a president is often less constrained. In Why England Slept, future U.S. president John F. Kennedy argued that British prime ministers Stanley Baldwin and Neville Chamberlain were constrained by the need to maintain the confidence of the Commons. It is easy for either the president or the legislature to escape blame by shifting it to the other. Describing the United States, former treasury secretary C. Douglas Dillon said, "The president blames Congress, the Congress blames the president, and the public remains confused and disgusted with the government in Washington". Years before becoming president, Woodrow Wilson famously wrote "how is the schoolmaster, the nation, to know which boy needs the whipping?" Walter Bagehot said of the American system, "The executive is crippled by not getting the law it needs, and the legislature is spoiled by having to act without responsibility: the executive becomes unfit for its name since it cannot execute what it decides on; the legislature is demoralized by liberty, by taking decisions of which others [and not itself] will suffer the effects".

Conversely, a presidential system can produce gridlock when the president and the legislature are in opposition. This rarely happens in a parliamentary system, as the prime minister is always a member of the party in power. This gridlock is a common occurrence, as the electorate often expects more rapid results than are possible from new policies and switches to a different party at the next election. Critics such as Juan Linz, argue that in such cases of gridlock, presidential systems do not offer voters the kind of accountability seen in parliamentary systems and that this inherent political instability can cause democracies to fail, as seen in such cases as Brazil and Allende's Chile.

A 2024 meta-analytical review found that presidential systems were associated with more corruption than parliamentary systems.

==== Continuity and crisis response ====
The structure of the political system can affect how quickly the government responds to national emergencies like economic collapse, terrorism, natural disasters, and so forth. The presidential system's structure enables it to respond more quickly and steadily than the parliamentary system, particularly in emergency situations, according to proponents of presidentialism. A fixed executive term, the division of powers among the departments, the concentration of decision-making authority, and ongoing leadership are all characteristics of the presidential system.

=== Presidential elections ===
==== Means of election ====
In a presidential system, the president is elected independently of the legislature. This may be done directly through a popular vote or indirectly, such as through the electoral college used in the United States. The U.S. format of the presidential system is sometimes touted as more democratic, as it provides a broader mandate for the president.

Once elected, a president typically remains in office until the conclusion of a term.

==== Fixed-terms ====
Some political scientists argue that presidential systems have difficulty sustaining democratic practices and that they have slipped into authoritarianism in many of the countries in which they have been implemented; in other words, the lack of constraints on cabinet formation actually enables the president to select a cabinet of loyalists. According to political scientist Fred Riggs, presidential systems have fallen into authoritarianism in nearly every country where they've been attempted. The list of the world's 22 older democracies includes only two countries (Costa Rica and the United States) with presidential systems. Yale political scientist Juan Linz argues that:

The danger that zero-sum presidential elections pose is compounded by the rigidity of the president's fixed term in office. Winners and losers are sharply defined for the entire period of the presidential mandate. Losers must wait four or five years without any access to executive power and patronage. The zero-sum game in presidential regimes raises the stakes of presidential elections and inevitably exacerbates their attendant tension and polarization.

==== Limited mechanisms of removal ====
Unlike in parliamentary systems, the legislature does not have the power to recall a president under the presidential system. However, presidential systems may have methods to remove presidents under extraordinary circumstances, such as a president committing a crime or becoming incapacitated. In some countries, presidents are subject to term limits.

The inability to remove a president early is also the subject of criticism. Even if a president is "proved to be inefficient, even if he becomes unpopular, even if his policy is unacceptable to the majority of his countrymen, he and his methods must be endured until the moment comes for a new election".

Some critics argue that the presidential system is weaker because it does not allow a transfer of power in the event of an emergency. Walter Bagehot argues that the ideal ruler in times of calm is different from the ideal ruler in times of crisis, criticizing the presidential system for having no mechanism to make such a change.

==== Heightened status ====
The president's status as both head of government and head of state is sometimes the subject of criticism. Dana D. Nelson criticizes the office of the President of the United States as essentially undemocratic and characterizes presidentialism as worship of the president by citizens, which she believes undermines civic participation.

==== Political budget cycles ====
A 2019 peer-reviewed meta-analysis based on 1,037 regressions in 46 studies finds that presidential systems generally seem to favor revenue cuts, while parliamentary systems would rely on fiscal expansion characterized by a higher level of spending before an election.

== Means of election ==
In a presidential system, the president is elected independently of the legislature. This may be done directly through a popular vote or indirectly, such as through the electoral college used in the United States. The U.S. format of the presidential system is sometimes touted as more democratic, as it provides a broader mandate for the president.

Once elected, a president typically remains in office until the conclusion of a term.

=== Fixed-terms ===
Some political scientists argue that presidential systems have difficulty sustaining democratic practices and that they have slipped into authoritarianism in many of the countries in which they have been implemented; in other words, the lack of constraints on cabinet formation actually enables the president to select a cabinet of loyalists. According to political scientist Fred Riggs, presidential systems have fallen into authoritarianism in nearly every country where they've been attempted. The list of the world's 22 older democracies includes only two countries (Costa Rica and the United States) with presidential systems. Yale political scientist Juan Linz argues that:

The danger that zero-sum presidential elections pose is compounded by the rigidity of the president's fixed term in office. Winners and losers are sharply defined for the entire period of the presidential mandate. Losers must wait four or five years without any access to executive power and patronage. The zero-sum game in presidential regimes raises the stakes of presidential elections and inevitably exacerbates their attendant tension and polarization.

=== Limited mechanisms of removal ===
Unlike in parliamentary systems, the legislature does not have the power to recall a president under the presidential system. However, presidential systems may have methods to remove presidents under extraordinary circumstances, such as a president committing a crime or becoming incapacitated. In some countries, presidents are subject to term limits.

The inability to remove a president early is also the subject of criticism. Even if a president is "proved to be inefficient, even if he becomes unpopular, even if his policy is unacceptable to the majority of his countrymen, he and his methods must be endured until the moment comes for a new election".

Some critics argue that the presidential system is weaker because it does not allow a transfer of power in the event of an emergency. Walter Bagehot argues that the ideal ruler in times of calm is different from the ideal ruler in times of crisis, criticizing the presidential system for having no mechanism to make such a change.

=== Heightened status ===
The president's status as both head of government and head of state is sometimes the subject of criticism. Dana D. Nelson criticizes the office of the President of the United States as essentially undemocratic and characterizes presidentialism as worship of the president by citizens, which she believes undermines civic participation.

=== Political budget cycles ===
A 2019 peer-reviewed meta-analysis based on 1,037 regressions in 46 studies finds that presidential systems generally seem to favor revenue cuts, while parliamentary systems would rely on fiscal expansion characterized by a higher level of spending before an election.

== Comparative politics ==
The separation of the executive and the legislature is the key difference between a presidential system and a parliamentary system. The presidential system elects a head of government independently of the legislature, while in contrast, the head of government in a parliamentary system answers directly to the legislature. Presidential systems necessarily operate under the principle of structural separation of powers, while parliamentary systems do not; however, the degree of functional separation of powers exhibited in each varies – dualistic parliamentary systems such as the Netherlands, Sweden and Slovakia forbid members of the legislature from serving in the executive simultaneously, while Westminster-type parliamentary systems such as the United Kingdom require it. Heads of government under the presidential system do not depend on the approval of the legislature as they do in a parliamentary system (except for mechanisms such as impeachment).

The presidential system and the parliamentary system can also be blended into a semi-presidential system. Under such a system, executive power is shared by an elected head of state (a president) and a legislature-appointed head of government (a prime minister or premier). The amount of power each figure holds may vary, and a semi-presidential system may lean closer to one system over the other.

=== Presidentialism metrics ===
Presidentialism metrics allow a quantitative comparison of the strength of presidential system characteristics for individual countries. Presidentialism metrics include the presidential index in V-Dem Democracy indices and presidential power scores. The table below shows for individual countries the V-Dem presidential index, where higher values indicate higher concentration of political power in the hands of one individual, such as the general secretary of the Communist Party in one-party ruling communist states.

Country	Presidentialism Index for 2021
Afghanistan	0.934
Albania	0.22
Algeria	0.807
Angola	0.627
Argentina	0.203
Armenia	0.297
Australia	0.01
Austria	0.047
Azerbaijan	0.965
Bahrain	0.917
Bangladesh	0.711
Barbados	0.091
Belarus	0.98
Belgium	0.051
Benin	0.419
Bhutan	0.117
Bolivia	0.535
Bosnia and Herzegovina	0.327
Botswana	0.176
Brazil	0.136
Bulgaria	0.16
Burkina Faso	0.314
Myanmar	0.879
Burundi	0.801
Cambodia	0.88
Cameroon	0.873
Canada	0.08
Cape Verde	0.098
Central African Republic	0.618
Chad	0.929
Chile	0.019
China	0.891
Colombia	0.133
Comoros	0.833
Costa Rica	0.033
Croatia	0.107
Cuba	0.806
Cyprus	0.151
Czech Republic	0.09
Democratic Republic of the Congo	0.689
Denmark	0.012
Djibouti	0.751
Dominican Republic	0.181
Ecuador	0.397
Egypt	0.494
El Salvador	0.855
Equatorial Guinea	0.966
Eritrea	0.977
Estonia	0.033
Eswatini	0.707
Ethiopia	0.735
Fiji	0.525
Finland	0.022
France	0.068
Gabon	0.752
Georgia	0.282
Germany	0.033
Ghana	0.13
Greece	0.12
Guatemala	0.351
Guinea	0.764
Guinea-Bissau	0.413
Guyana	0.276
Haiti	0.706
Honduras	0.402
Hong Kong	0.569
Hungary	0.288
Iceland	0.051
India	0.227
Indonesia	0.206
Iran	0.812
Iraq	0.484
Ireland	0.04
Israel	0.1
Italy	0.089
Ivory Coast	0.532
Jamaica	0.084
Japan	0.135
Jordan	0.25
Kazakhstan	0.807
Kenya	0.132
Kosovo	0.296
Kuwait	0.317
Kyrgyzstan	0.614
Laos	0.59
Latvia	0.036
Lebanon	0.539
Lesotho	0.123
Liberia	0.296
Libya	0.479
Lithuania	0.025
Luxembourg	0.092
Madagascar	0.677
Malawi	0.136
Malaysia	0.354
Maldives	0.211
Mali	0.623
Malta	0.131
Mauritania	0.74
Mauritius	0.194
Mexico	0.369
Moldova	0.122
Mongolia	0.207
Montenegro	0.246
Morocco	0.348
Mozambique	0.442
Namibia	0.207
Nepal	0.213
Netherlands	0.028
New Zealand	0.016
Nicaragua	0.987
Niger	0.32
Nigeria	0.36
North Korea	0.986
North Macedonia	0.46
Norway	0.015
Oman	0.574
Pakistan	0.286
Palestine (Gaza)	0.807
Palestine (West Bank)	0.585
Panama	0.297
Papua New Guinea	0.197
Paraguay	0.258
Peru	0.094
Philippines	0.35
Poland	0.361
Portugal	0.056
Qatar	0.716
Republic of the Congo	0.779
Romania	0.184
Russia	0.898
Rwanda	0.738
Sao Tome and Principe	0.213
Saudi Arabia	0.814
Senegal	0.236
Serbia	0.404
Seychelles	0.055
Sierra Leone	0.296
Singapore	0.298
Slovakia	0.047
Slovenia	0.159
Solomon Islands	0.216
Somalia	0.756
Somaliland	0.599
South Africa	0.13
South Korea	0.076
South Sudan	0.881
Spain	0.031
Sri Lanka	0.252
Sudan	0.692
Suriname	0.126
Sweden	0.02
Switzerland	0.013
Syria	0.922
Taiwan	0.15
Tajikistan	0.943
Tanzania	0.15
Thailand	0.419
The Gambia	0.131
Timor-Leste	0.29
Togo	0.804
Trinidad and Tobago	0.113
Tunisia	0.113
Turkey	0.722
Turkmenistan	0.907
Uganda	0.411
Ukraine	0.597
United Arab Emirates	0.835
United Kingdom	0.062
United States of America	0.078
Uruguay	0.045
Uzbekistan	0.905
Vanuatu	0.102
Venezuela	0.958
Vietnam	0.726
Yemen	0.884
Zambia	0.277
Zanzibar	0.591

== States with a presidential system of government ==
=== Presidential republics without a prime minister ===
- Angola (Note: President and legislature are elected directly by the people via double simultaneous vote.)
- Benin
- Bolivia
- Brazil
- Chile
- Colombia
- Comoros
- Costa Rica
- Cyprus
- Dominican Republic
- Ecuador
- El Salvador
- Gabon
- Gambia
- Ghana
- Guatemala
- Honduras
- Indonesia
- Liberia
- Malawi
- Maldives
- Mexico
- Nicaragua
- Nigeria
- Palau
- Panama
- Paraguay
- Philippines
- Seychelles
- Somaliland
- Turkey
- Turkmenistan
- United States
- Uruguay
- Venezuela
- Zambia

Non-UN members are in italics.

=== Presidential republics with a prime minister ===
The following countries have presidential systems where the post of prime minister (official title may vary) exists alongside that of the president. The president is often still both the head of state and government and the prime minister's role is to mostly assist the president.

- Abkhazia
- Argentina (see Chief of the Cabinet of Ministers)
- Burundi (Note: The prime minister is the official head of government, but they are appointed directly by the president and hold little power, so the nation is still usually classified as a presidential republic)
- Cameroon
- Central African Republic
- Djibouti
- Equatorial Guinea
- Guinea
- Ivory Coast
- Kenya (see Prime Cabinet Secretary)
- Kyrgyzstan (see Chairman of the Cabinet of Ministers)
- Senegal
- Sierra Leone (see Chief minister)
- South Korea
- Tajikistan
- Tanzania
- Tunisia
- Uganda

Non-UN members are in italics.

=== Theocratic presidential republic ===
Iran combines the forms of a presidential republic, with a president elected by universal suffrage, and a theocracy, with a Supreme Leader who is ultimately responsible for state policy, chosen for life by the elected Assembly of Experts. Candidates for both the Assembly of Experts and the presidency are vetted by the appointed Guardian Council.

=== Presidential system in administrative divisions ===
Dependencies of the United States

- American Samoa
- Guam
- Northern Mariana Islands
- Puerto Rico
- United States Virgin Islands

Special administrative regions of China

- Hong Kong
- Macau

=== Former presidential republics ===
- Islamic Republic of Afghanistan (2004–2021)
- Azerbaijan SSR/Azerbaijan (1990–1991, 1992–2016) (Note: as the Azerbaijan SSR, it was a presidential republic in 1990–1991, a semi-presidential republic after independence in 1991–1992, a presidential republic in 1992–2016 and a semi-presidential republic in 2016. Under a hereditary dictatorship since 1993)
- Cuba (1902–1959)
- Estonia (1938–1940)
- Georgia (1995–2004) (Note: as the Georgian SSR and after independence, parliamentary in 1990–1991, semi-presidential in 1991–1995, presidential in 1995–2004, semi-presidential in 2004–2019 and parliamentary since 2019.)
- Germany (1930–1933) de facto (Note: A semi-presidential republic as the Weimar Republic in 1918–1930, a presidential republic in 1930–1933, a totalitarian dictatorship under a parliamentary system in 1933–1945 as a Nazi Germany, a military occupation in 1945–1949 and a parliamentary republic in 1949.)
- Greece (1822–1832, 1973–1974)
- Haiti (1859–1957, 1957–1986)
- Katanga (1960–1963)
- Kirghiz SSR/Kyrgyzstan (1990–1993) (Note: Presidential in 1990–1993, Semi-presidential in 1993–2010 (de jure); 1993–2021 (de facto), Parliamentary in 2010–2021 (de jure), and presidential again in 2021.)
- Mali (1960–1992) (Note: A presidential republic (1960–1991, 2023-present), military dictatorship (1968–1991,1991–1992, 2012, 2020-present) single-party state (1960–1968, 1974–1991) semi-presidential republic (1991–2023).)
- Mauritania (1960–1978) (Note: A one-party presidential republic (1960–1978), military dictatorship (1978–1992, 2005–2007, 2008–2009), semi-presidential republic since 1992.)
- Niger (1960–1974, 1989–1993) (Note: A single-party presidential republic (1960–1974, 1989–1993), a military dictatorship (1974–1993, 1996–1999, 1999, 2010–2011, 2023-present), a semi-presidential republic (1993–1996, 1999–2010, 2011–2023))
- Pakistan (1958–1973, 1978–1985, 2001–2002)
- Poland (1935–1939)
- RSFSR/Russia (1991–1992) de facto
- South Korea (1963–1972) (Note: All South Korean constitutions since 1963 provided for a strong executive Presidency; in addition, the formally authoritarian Yushin Constitution of the Fourth Republic established a presidential power to dissolve the National Assembly, nominally counterbalanced by a vote of no confidence. Both of these provisions were retained by the Fifth Republic's constitution but repealed upon the transition to democracy and the establishment of the Sixth Republic)
- South Vietnam (1955–1975)
- Tajik SSR (1990–1991)
- Texas (1836–1845)
- Togo (1960–2024)
- Turkmen SSR (1990–1991)
- Ukraine (1995–1996) (Note: An interim constitution passed in 1995 removed the President's ability to dissolve the Verkhovna Rada and Rada's ability to dismiss the government by a vote of no confidence. Both of these provisions were restored upon the passage of a permanent constitution in 1996.)
- Uzbek SSR (1990–1991)
- Zimbabwe (1987–2026)

==== Republics with executive governors ====
- Vermont Republic (1777–1791)
- United Provinces of the Río de la Plata (1820–1832) and Argentine Confederation (1835–1852)
- Alabama (1861–1865)
- Georgia (1861–1865)
- Louisiana (1861–1865)
- Texas (1861–1865)
- Mississippi (1861–1865)
- South Carolina (1861–1865)
- Florida (1861–1865)
- Virginia (1861–1865)
- Arkansas (1861–1865)
- North Carolina (1861–1865)
- Tennessee (1861–1865)
- Missouri (1861–1865)
- Kentucky (1861–1865)
