= Behavioral public administration =

Study of psychological methods in politics

Behavioral Public Administration (BPA) is the study of psychological methods and findings in political administrative settings, that is, cognitive and decision biases and discriminations by bureaucrats, the interaction between citizens and bureaucrats, and the psychological effects of public service failure.

It is the study of behaviors and methodology for administrative purposes. It attempts to better understand the cycle of causes and consequences after putting orders or laws into motion to govern or administrate one or many humans within a specific group. It is an interdisciplinary academic discipline that studies public administration "from the micro-level perspective of individual and group behavior and attitudes."

== Components of study ==
Behavioral public administration has three main components:

1. As analysis units (or the framework within which the analysis will be carried out), it makes use of both individual and group citizens, public sector workers, and managers.
2. The conduct and viewpoints of these groups are highlighted.
3. To research public administration, it combines ideas from the behavioral sciences and psychology. The behavioral approach to public administration uses psychological theories and methods to study the attitudes and behaviors of citizens, public professionals, and public managers. It is a complement to traditional public administration research, adding the ability to make more detailed theories in addition to the previously dominant big-picture theories of public administration. By drawing on these insights, the approach attempts to improve knowledge and the skill of practitioners in public administration and academia.

The application of psychology in the behavioral approach, for instance, may provide insight into raising citizens' performance views. To what degree nudging is an effective policy instrument is another example of how the inclusion of psychology might assist. Since it provides insights into how theories developed in controlled environments hold up when tested in complex public environments, the integration of public administration and psychology can also benefit psychologists. This makes the behavioral approach very beneficial to policy-makers and public officials.

== History and development ==
The Journal of Behavioral Public Administration was established in response to the increasing amount of research being conducted at the nexus of psychology and public administration. Its inaugural issue was released in 2018. The journal, edited by professors Sebastian Jilke, Joanna Lahey, Kenneth J. Meier, and William G. Resh, is dedicated to behavioral and experimental research in public administration.

Scholars like [[Herbert A.] set the precedent for behavioral research in public administration. Simon]]. Simon states that "decision-making is the heart of the administration, and that the vocabulary of administrative theory must be derived from the logic and psychology of human choice." Other public administration scholars have also argued for a tighter connection between the fields of psychology and public administration.

Some of the leading research studies on BPA are Performance information in politics: How framing, format, and rhetoric matter to politicians’ preferences (2019) by Martin Bækgaard, Street-Level Bureaucrats as Individual Policymakers: The Relationship between Attitudes and Coping Behavior toward Vulnerable Children and Youth (2017) by Siddhartha Baviskar and Søren C. Winter, and The Creativity of Coping: Alternative Tales of Moral Dilemmas among Migration Control Officers (2018) by Lisa Marie Borrelli and Annika Lindberg.

The application of psychological theories and methods in public administration is becoming more common, but it is still less common than in other academic fields like economics, political science, and management studies. Within these research domains, psychology-based subfields have developed, such as behavioral economics, industrial and organizational psychology, and political psychology..

While the number of psychology-informed research studies in public administration might be small, the number is increasing. Public administration scholars have begun incorporating theories from the field of psychology into the study of public leadership and public service motivation, transparency, public service competition, public choice, blame avoidance among policymakers, performance information, and trust of civil servants. The methods and measurement techniques used to study public administration have, to an increasing extent, become influenced by the practices of the psychological field, most notably seen as in the more frequent use of experiments.
