= Kyonggi University Graduate School of Political Studies =

Graduate school in South Korea

Kyonggi University Graduate School of Political Studies (GSPS)
- 경기대학교 정치전문대학원
- Established: 1995; 31 years ago
- Dean: Hyunjoo Min
- Faculty: 23 (including 4 endowed chairs)
- Location: Seoul, South Korea
- Campus: Urban
- Website: GSPS Homepage

Korean name
- Hangul: 경기대학교 정치전문대학원
- Hanja: 京畿大學校 政治專門大學院
- RR: Gyeonggi daehakgyo jeongchi jeonmun daehagwon
- MR: Kyŏnggi taehakkyo chŏngch'i chŏnmun taehagwŏn

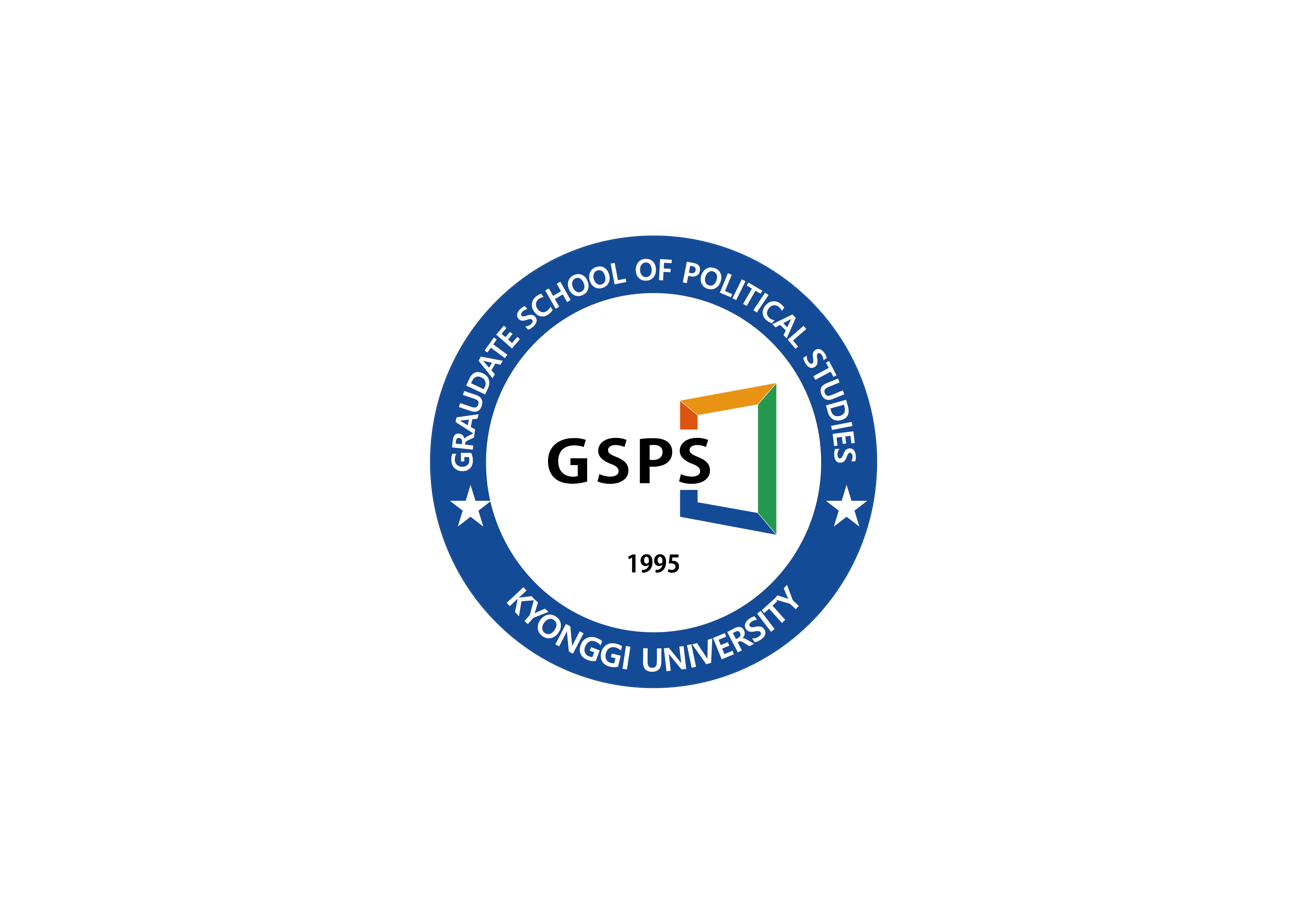

The Graduate School of Political Studies (GSPS) at Kyonggi University is a political science and public administration school located in Seoul, South Korea. Founded in 1995, GSPS was the first school to combine international politics, political science, and public administration with the North Korean studies in South Korea. In addition to a degree in political science, GSPS offered classes in national security, North Korean studies, and public affairs, which eventually led to international politics and public administration degrees.

== Degree Program ==
GSPS is home to four academic departments, including: Department of Political Science and Law, Department of North Korean Studies, Department of Foreign Policy and National Security, and Department of Public Policy. GSPS offers a two-year three master's degrees in political science, international politics, and public administration and three doctoral degrees in political science, international politics, and public administration.

== Policy Initiatives ==
- In September 2023, GSPS also organized the inaugural Incheon Security Conference with the Incheon Metropolitan City and the Korean Institute for Presidential Studies to commemorate the Incheon Landing Operation in 1950. This landing operation, known as Operation Chromite was the pivotal moment that changed the tide of the 1950-53 Korean War.
- In May 2025, GSPS organized the special committee with MBN (Maeil Broadcasting Network), Korean Association for Public Administration, Korean Economic Association, Korean Public Law Association, and Korean Institute for Presidential Studies to evaluate the campaign promises of presidential candidates in the 2025 Presidential Election.

== Notable alumni ==
- Byung Joo Kim, Assemblyman, 21st National Assembly (since 2020) and former Korean Army Four-star General (Ph.D. International Politics, 2015)
- Eun-gi Kim, former Korean Air Force Chief of Staff and former president, Daejeon Institute of Science and Technology (Ph.D. International Politics, 2003)
- Hu-duk Yoon, Assemblyman, 21st, 20th, and 19th National Assembly (since 2012) (Ph.D. Political Science, 2009)
- Gu-shik Choe, Assemblyman, 17th and 18th National Assembly (Master of International Politics, 2006)

== Notable faculty ==
- Seok-yeon Lee, Distinguished Professor of Political Science and Law; Chairman (Deputy Prime Minister) (2025-2026), Presidential Committee for National Cohesion;Minister of Government Legislation (2008-2010).
- Hyunjoo Min, Dean (2026-present) of the Graduate School of Political Studies;Professor of Social Studies; Assemblywoman, 18th National Assembly.
- Sung Deuk Hahm, Executive Vice President (2026-present) of the Seoul Campus;Naun Chair Professor of Political Science and Law; Dean (2021-2026) of the Graduate School of Political Studies.
- Sang-chul Park, Professor Emeritus of North Korean Studies; Chief (2023–2024), Korean National Assembly Research Service.
- Chu-hong Nam, Professor Emeritus of Foreign Policy and National Security; South Korean Ambassador to Canada (2011–2012).
