= James L. Perry =

Career academic

- Born: May 11, 1948 (age 78); Two Rivers, Wisconsin
- Education: University of Chicago (BA, 1970); MPA from Syracuse University (1972); PhD from Syracuse University (1974)
- Occupation: Professor
- Employer(s): Indiana University (1985–present; emeritus since 2013); University of California, Irvine (1974–1985)
- Known for: Public service motivation
- Title: Distinguished Professor Emeritus
- Spouse: Wendy Perry
- Awards: H. George Frederickson Award (2015); John Gaus Award (2017); Routledge Prize (2018); Keith Provan Award (2021); Dwight Waldo Award (2008); Fellow, National Academy of Public Administration (1998)
- Website: http://www.indiana.edu/~jlpweb/index.php https://psm.indiana.edu/

James L. Perry is an American public administration scholar and Distinguished Professor Emeritus and Chancellor's Professor of Public and Environmental Affairs Emeritus at the Paul H. O'Neill School of Public and Environmental Affairs at Indiana University. He is also an affiliate professor of philanthropic studies at the Indiana University Lilly Family School of Philanthropy. With Lois Wise, he initiated the study of public service motivation in a 1990 article in Public Administration Review. He has received the Dwight Waldo Award, the John Gaus Award and the Routledge Prize, and is a Fellow of the National Academy of Public Administration.

Perry's published work has accumulated nearly 50,000 citations on Google Scholar. His 1990 paper with Wise has been cited more than 5,800 times and is among the most cited articles in Public Administration Review. A 2009 review of citation patterns in public policy, public administration, and public law for 1985–2005 identified Perry as the sixteenth most frequently cited scholar in those fields.

== Education ==
Perry received a B.A. from the University of Chicago in 1970, and an M.P.A. in 1972 and a Ph.D. in 1974 from the Maxwell School of Citizenship and Public Affairs at Syracuse University.

== Career ==
Perry, who has only worked in academia, began his career in 1974 at University of California, Irvine, in the Graduate School of Management. After 11 years at UC – Irvine, which included positions as associate dean and doctoral program coordinator, Perry began his tenure at Indiana University Paul H. O'Neill School of Public and Environmental Affairs (O'Neill School). During his 28 years at the O'Neill School, he served as a visiting professor at Chinese University of Hong Kong, visiting professor at the Robert M. La Follette School of Public Affairs, and distinguished visiting professor at Yonsei University in South Korea. He has held numerous leadership positions during his tenure at Indiana University, including director of Indiana University American Democracy Project, associate dean at Indiana University-Purdue University Indianapolis, chair of Policy and Administration Faculty, and director of the Joint PhD program in public policy.

Perry was appointed Chancellor's Professor of Public and Environmental Affairs in 1998 and named Distinguished Professor in 2009, and in 2013 he became Distinguished Professor Emeritus and Chancellor's Professor of Public and Environmental Affairs Emeritus. He has been an affiliate professor of philanthropic studies at the Lilly Family School of Philanthropy since 1994.

From 1998 to 2000 Perry served as the editor-in-chief of the Journal of Public Affairs Education. He also served as editor-in-chief of Public Administration Review between 2012 and 2017, and is currently the co-editor of Asia Pacific Journal of Public Administration. He was also a founding associate editor of the Journal of Public Administration Research and Theory.

== Research ==
Perry's research addresses public management, public personnel administration, public service motivation, and the organization of public and nonprofit work. In the 1990 article with Wise, public service motivation was defined as "an individual's predisposition to respond to motives grounded primarily or uniquely in public institutions". In 1996 he published a measurement instrument for the construct comprising four dimensions: attraction to public policy making, commitment to the public interest, compassion, and self-sacrifice. The construct has since been examined by researchers in more than 50 countries. In 2013 Perry launched the Public Service Motivation Research Bibliography at Indiana University, a curated index of scholarship on the construct.

His other research areas have included civil service reform, merit pay and performance management, government and nonprofit collaboration, the diffusion of computing in local government, and the evaluation of national service programs such as AmeriCorps.

== Government and public service engagements ==
Perry has held appointed and advisory positions in U.S. federal and state government. He served as a special assistant to the Assistant Secretary for Personnel Administration at the United States Department of Health and Human Services in 1992 and as a senior research associate with the National Academy of Public Administration in 1992–1993. He was a member of the National Academy of Public Administration panels on "The Future Navy Civilian Personnel System" (1999–2001) and "The Navy Two-Level Performance Management System" (2001), and served on the academy's Advisory Panel for the Center for Human Resources Management from 1999 to 2004. From 1999 to 2000 he was a senior evaluator in the Corporation for National Service's Department of Evaluation and Effective Practice.

Perry served as a commissioner on the Indiana Commission on Community Service and Volunteerism from 2001 to 2007, including a term as chair in 2004–2005.

Perry held two Fulbright appointments: a Fulbright Scholar at the Chinese University of Hong Kong in 1985–1986 and a Fulbright Distinguished Lecturer at Yonsei University in 2006–2007. He was selected as a Fulbright Specialist for 2021–2025.

== Awards and honors ==
Perry's honors include:

- 2023: NASPAA Journal of Public Affairs Education and Teaching Public Administration Award for Excellence in Public Administration Education
- 2021: Keith Provan Award, Academy of Management Public and Nonprofit Division
- 2020: Indiana University Bicentennial Medal
- 2018: Routledge Prize for outstanding contributions to public management research, International Research Society for Public Management
- 2017: John Gaus Award, American Political Science Association
- 2015: H. George Frederickson Award for career contributions to the field of public management, Public Management Research Association
- 2008: Dwight Waldo Award, American Society for Public Administration
- 2004: Best Book Award, Public and Nonprofit Division, Academy of Management, for Civic Service: What Difference Does It Make?
- 1998: Fellow, National Academy of Public Administration
- 1997: Distinguished Research Award, American Society for Public Administration and National Association of Schools of Public Affairs and Administration
- 1991: Charles H. Levine Memorial Award for Excellence in Public Administration, American Society for Public Administration and National Association of Schools of Public Affairs and Administration

== Bibliography ==
- Managing Organizations to Sustain Passion for Public Service (2021)
- Public Service and Good Governance for the Twenty-first Century (2020)
- Handbook of Public Administration, 3rd Edition (2015)
- Motivation in Public Management: The Call of Public Service (2008)
- Civic Service: What Difference Does It Make? (2004)

The 2015 Handbook of Public Administration was co-edited with Robert K. Christensen and published by Jossey-Bass, and the 2008 Motivation in Public Management was co-edited with Annie Hondeghem and published by Oxford University Press. Civic Service: What Difference Does It Make? was co-authored with Ann Marie Thomson and published by M.E. Sharpe, and Public Service and Good Governance for the Twenty-first Century was published by University of Pennsylvania Press.

=== Selected journal articles ===
- Perry, James L.; Wise, Lois R. (1990). "The Motivational Bases of Public Service". Public Administration Review. 50 (3): 367–373.
- Perry, James L. (1996). "Measuring Public Service Motivation: An Assessment of Construct Reliability and Validity". Journal of Public Administration Research and Theory. 6 (1): 5–22.
- Perry, James L. (2000). "Bringing Society In: Toward a Theory of Public-Service Motivation". Journal of Public Administration Research and Theory. 10 (2): 471–488.
- Thomson, A. M.; Perry, James L.; Miller, T. K. (2009). "Conceptualizing and Measuring Collaboration". Journal of Public Administration Research and Theory. 19 (1): 23–56.
- Perry, James L.; Hondeghem, Annie; Wise, Lois R. (2010). "Revisiting the Motivational Bases of Public Service: Twenty Years of Research and an Agenda for the Future". Public Administration Review. 70 (5): 681–690.
- Han, Y.; Perry, James L. (2020). "Employee Accountability: Development of a Multidimensional Scale". International Public Management Journal. 23 (2): 224–251.
