= Journal of Public Affairs Education =

- Discipline: Public administration
- Language: English
- Edited by: Sara Rinfret; Sarah Young

Publication details
- Former name(s): Journal of Public Administration Education
- History: 1995–present
- Publisher: Routledge on behalf of the Network of Schools of Public Policy, Affairs, and Administration
- Frequency: Quarterly

Standard abbreviations
- ISO 4: J. Public Aff. Educ.

Indexing
- ISSN: 1523-6803 (print); 2328-9643 (web)
- LCCN: 2010235323
- JSTOR: 15236803
- OCLC no.: 884670625
- Journal of Public Administration Education
- ISSN: 1087-7789

Links
- Journal homepage; Online access; Online archive; Journal page at society website

The Journal of Public Affairs Education is a quarterly peer-reviewed academic journal of public administration education that is published by Routledge on behalf of the Network of Schools of Public Policy, Affairs, and Administration. Since 2024, the editors-in-chief are Sara Rinfret (Northern Arizona University) and Sarah Young (Kennesaw State University).

== History ==
The journal was established in 1995 by H. George Frederickson as the Journal of Public Administration Education. Initially published in coordination with the American Society for Public Administration's Section on Public Administration Education (SPAE), the National Association of Schools of Public Affairs and Administration (NASPAA) began discussions in 1996 on sponsoring the journal. In the fall of 1997, Frederickson transferred ownership of the journal to NASPAA. Under the new ownership, the name of the journal was changed to the current one to reflect the breadth of NASPAA's mission and to increase the appeal of the journal. Despite the change in name and ownership, the journal has continued to maintain a loose affiliation with SPAE.

From 1997, the journal was published by NASPAA; since January 2018 production and distribution were moved to Routledge.

=== Editors-in-chief ===
The following persons have been editors-in-chief:

- 2018–2023: Bruce D. McDonald III, North Carolina State University
- 2018–2023: William Hatcher, Augusta University
- 2016–2017: Marieka Klawitter, University of Washington
- 2010–2017: David Schultz, Hamline University
- 2009–2010: Heather E. Campbell, Arizona State University
- 2007–2008: Mario A. Rivera, University of New Mexico
- 2006–2006: Bruce Perlman, University of New Mexico
- 2001–2005: Ed Jennings, University of Kentucky
- 1998–2000: James L. Perry, Indiana University
- 1995–1997: Frank Marini, University of Akron

== Abstracting and indexing ==
The journal is abstracted and indexed in:

- Emerging Sources Citation Index
- EBSCO databases
- PAIS International
- ProQuest databases
- Scopus

== See also ==
- List of public administration journals
