= Beryl Radin =

American public administration scholar (1937–2024)

- Born: 15 November 1936; Aberdeen, South Dakota
- Died: 27 December 2024 (aged 88)
- Education: Antioch College (BA); University of Minnesota (MA); University of California, Berkeley (PhD)
- Scientific career
- Fields: Public administration Public policy Policy analysis
- Workplaces: Goucher College; University of Texas, Austin; University of Southern California; University at Albany, SUNY; University of Baltimore; American University; Georgetown University

Beryl A. Radin (November 15, 1936 – December 7, 2024) was an American public administration author, researcher, and professor. An elected member of the National Academy of Public Administration, she was the managing editor of the Journal of Public Administration Research and Theory from 2000 to 2005. Radin created and served as the Editor of the Georgetown University Press book series, Public Management and Change. Her government service included two years as a Special Advisor to the Assistant Secretary for Management and Budget of the US Department of Health and Human Services and other agencies and a range of consultancies. Radin died on 27 December 2024, at the age of 88.

== Education and positions ==
Radin was born on November 15, 1936, in Aberdeen, South Dakota. She is a first generation American from a Jewish family. She graduated from Antioch College with a BA in History in 1958. She then graduated from the University of Minnesota with a MA in American Studies. She worked as Assistant Information Officer at the United States Commission on Civil Rights from 1963 to 1965. Radin decided to return to school following the 1968 United States presidential election and in 1973 earned her PhD from University of California, Berkeley in Social Policies Planning.

Radin has been a past president of the Association of Public Policy Analysis and Management and has been active in the public administration section of the American Political Science Association and the Public Management Research Association as well as the International Public Policy Association.

== Publications ==
Radin wrote more than a dozen books and many articles on public policy and public management issues. Much of her work has focused on policy analysis, intergovernmental relationships and federal management change. Her recent work has focused on comparative policy analysis. Her most recent books are Defining Policy Analysis: A Journey that Never Ends (published by Cambridge University Press); Policy Analysis in the Twenty-First Century: Complexity, Conflict, and Cases (published by Routledge); the second edition of her book on policy analysis, Beyond Machiavelli: Policy Analysis Reaches Midlife; and Federal Management Reform In a World of Contradictions, both published by Georgetown University Press.

== Awards & Achievements ==
Radin received the 2014 International Research Society for Public Management Routledge Prize for Outstanding Contribution to Public Management Research, the John Gaus Award from the American Political Science Association in 2012, and the H. George Frederickson Award for Lifetime Achievement from the Public Management Research Association in 2009. She was the recipient of the 2002 Donald Stone Award given by the American Society for Public Administration’s section on intergovernmental management to recognize a scholar’s distinguished record. Radin was a senior Fulbright lecturer in India and has continued research in that country; she has also been involved in teaching and research in Hong Kong, Israel, Denmark, Azerbaijan and Australia.
