= Korean Institute for Presidential Studies =

Korean research foundation

Korean Institute for Presidential Studies (KIPS)
- Native name: (사)한국대통령학연구소
- Type: Non-profit organization
- Founded: 1999; 27 years ago
- Headquarters: Gangnam District, Seoul, South Korea
- Website: epresident.co.kr

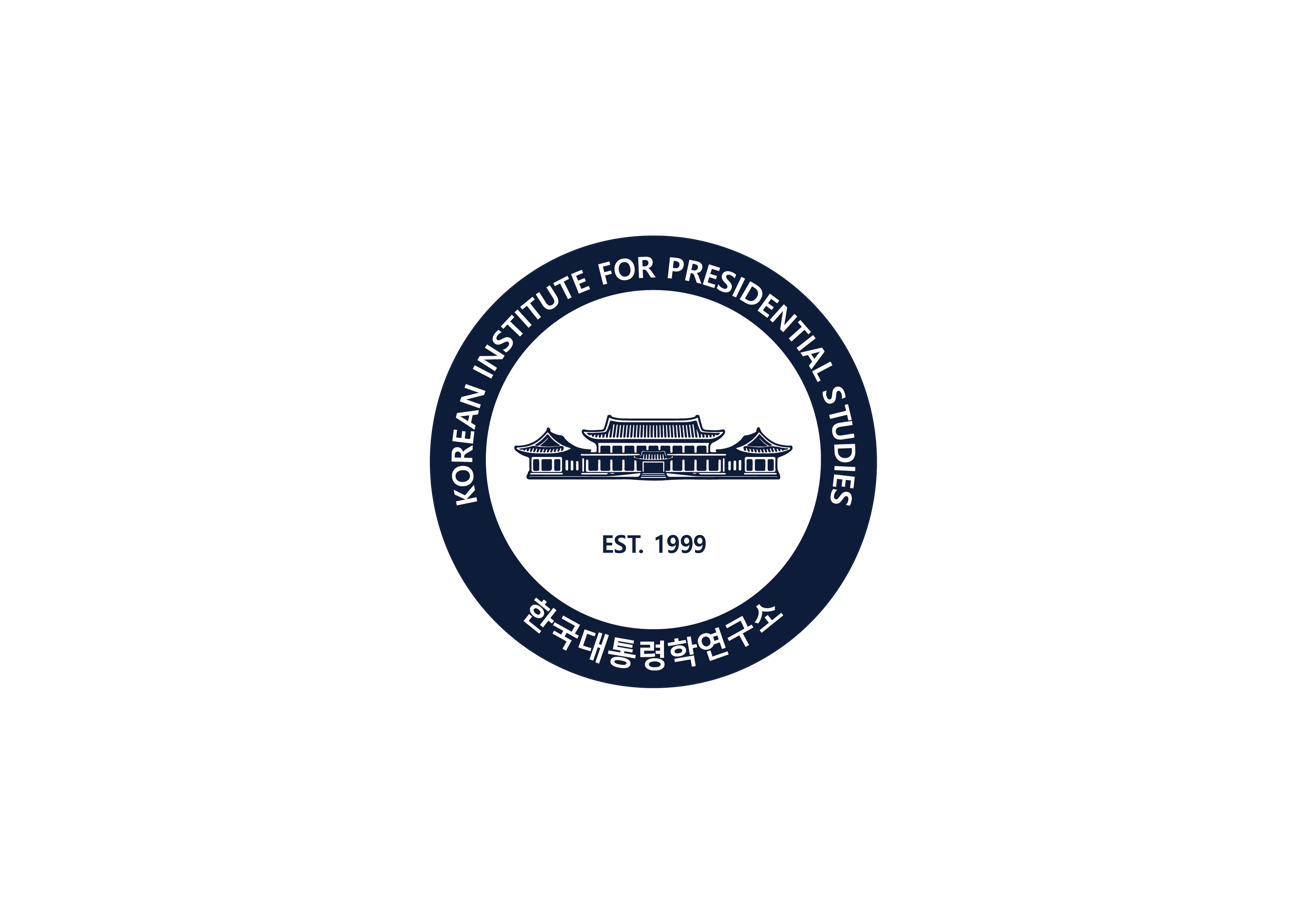

The Korean Institute for Presidential Studies (KIPS) is an independent research foundation located in Seoul, South Korea. Founded in 1999, KIPS evaluates the presidential performance in South Korea and conducts research and education in the presidential studies. KIPS also publishes the Korean Presidential Studies Series with the Korean Association for Presidential Studies and the Nanam Publishing House.

== Recent Policy Initiatives ==
- In June 2026, KIPS hosted a symposium with the Korea Times under the theme "President Lee Jae-myung: One Year in Office."
- In April 2026, KIPS hosted a roundtable discussion with the Korean Ministry of Foreign Affairs, Trilateral Cooperation Secretariat, Korea Times, and Kyonggi University Graduate School of Political Studies under the theme "How to Strengthen Korea-China-Japan Trilateral Cooperation in an Era of Global Upheaval?"
- In May 2025, KIPS hosted a roundtable discussion with the Korea Times under the theme "What to Expect in the June 3 Presidential Election."
- In May 2025, KIPS organized the special committee with MBN (Maeil Broadcasting Network), Korean Association for Public Administration, Korean Economic Association, Korean Public Law Association, and Kyonggi University Graduate School of Political Studies to evaluate the campaign promises of presidential candidates in the 2025 Presidential Election.
- In September 2023, KIPS supported the inaugural Incheon Security Conference with the Incheon Metropolitan City and Kyonggi University Graduate School of Political Studies to commemorate the Incheon Landing Operation in 1950. This landing operation, known as Operation Chromite was the pivotal moment that changed the tide of the 1950-53 Korean War.

== Notable Scholars ==
Chairman

- Sung Deuk Hahm, Executive Vice President (2026- present) of the Seoul Campus; Dean (2021–2026) of the Graduate School of Political Studies; Naun Chair Professor of Political Science and Law at Kyonggi University

Director

- Dong Wook Yim, Vice President for Administration & External Affairs (2021–present); Professor of General Education, Cha University

Members of the Executive Board

- Yong Jae Jin, Professor Emeritus of Political Science and International Relations, Yonsei University; President (2017), Korean Political Science Association
- Kwang Ho Jung, Professor of Public Administration, Seoul National University; President (2024), Korean Association of Public Administration; Dean (2020-2022), Graduate School of Public Administration, Seoul National University
- Sam Youl Lee, Professor of Public Policy and Management, Yonsei University; Editor-in-Chief (2024–present), Yonsei University Press
