= Uk Heo =

Uk Heo is university distinguished professor of political science at the University of Wisconsin–Milwaukee.

He is the Editor-in-Chief of Asian Survey since 2019. Asian Survey is one of the oldest journals focusing on Asian politics and society, which is managed by the Institute of East Asian Studies at the University of California-Berkeley and published by the University of California Press since 1932.

== Education ==
Heo obtained his B.A. from Yonsei University in Seoul, Korea. He then went on to earn his MA degree from the University of Wyoming and finally his Ph.D. from Texas A&M University.

== Selected publications ==
- "South Korea's Soft Power: The Korean Wave." Cambridge University Press. 2026. (with Sooho Song).
- "The Evolution of the South Korea-United States Alliance." Cambridge University Press. 2018. (with Terence Roehrig).
- "South Korea's Rise: Economic Development, Power, and Foreign Relations." Cambridge University Press. 2014. (with Terence Roehrig).
- South Korea since 1980. Cambridge University Press. 2010. (with Terence Roehrig).
- “Comparative Analysis of Soft Power between South Korea and the United States: A Theoretical Mechanism Approach.” 2025. Journal of Asian and African Studies 60 (with Sung Deuk Hahm and Sooho Song)
- “The Economic Effects of Winning Coalition Size on the Aid-Growth Nexus." 2024. Social Science Quarterly 105(4): 1107–1122. (with Yunhee Choi)
- “US Military Deployment and Its Effects on South Korea’s Politics and Economy.” 2021. Journal of Asian and African Studies 56 (4): 964–982. (with Seongyi Yun)
- “US Military Deployment and Host Nation Economic Growth.” 2019. Armed Forces and Society 45(2): 234–267. (with Min Ye)
- “Economic Globalization and Democracy Development in East Asia: The Indirect Link” 2019. Journal of Asian and African Studies 53(2): 248–266. (with Hayam Kim)
- “History and Territorial Disputes, Domestic Politics, and International Relations: An Analysis of the Relationship among South Korea, China, and Japan.” 2019. Korea Observer 50(1): 53–80. (with Sung Deuk Hahm)
- “International Organizations and Democracy Development: The Indirect Link” 2018. Social Science Quarterly 99(1): 423–438. (with Hayam Kim)
- “The Relationship between Defense Spending and Economic Growth around the Globe: The Direct and Indirect Link.” 2016. International Interactions 42(5): 774–796. (with Min Ye)
- “Democracy, Institutional Maturity, and Economic Development.” 2015. Social Science Quarterly 96(4): 1041–1058. (with Sung Deuk Hahm)
- “Political Culture and Democratic Consolidation in South Korea.” 2014. Asian Survey 54(5): 918–940. (with Sung Deuk Hahm)
- "Another View on the Relationship between Democratization and Intra-Military Division in South Korea." 2014. Armed Forces and Society. 40(2): 382–391. (with Seongyi Yun)
- “What Delays Democratic Consolidation in South Korea?” 2013. Korea Observer 44(4): 569–591.
- “The Third Wave of Democratization and Economic Performance in Asia: Theory and Application." 2012. Korea Observer 43(1): 1-20. (with Sung Deuk Hahm)
- “Who Pays for National Defense: Financing Defense Programs in the United States, 1947-2007.” 2012. Journal of Conflict Resolution 56(3): 406-431. (with John Bohte)
- "The Relationship between Defense Spending and Economic Growth in the United States." 2010. Political Research Quarterly 63(4): 760–770.
- “Corruption and Foreign Direct Investment in Asia.” 2009. Asian Politics and Policy 1(2): 223-238. (with Jung-Yeop Woo)
- "The Political Economy of South Korea: Economic Growth, Democratization, and Financial Crisis.” 2008. Maryland Series in Contemporary Asian Studies (Monograph Series), University of Maryland School of Law. (with Hyoungcheul Jeon, Hayam Kim, and Ok Jin Kim)
- "The Economic Effects of US and Japanese Foreign Direct Investment in East Asia: A Comparative Analysis." 2008. Policy Studies Journal 36(3): 385-402 (with Sung Deuk Hahm).
- “The Political Economy of U.S. Direct Investment in East Asian NICs, 1966-2000.” 2007. International Interactions 33(2): 119–133. (with Sung Deuk Hahm)
- “Politics, Economics, and Defense Spending in South Korea.” 2006. Armed Forces and Society 32(4): 604–622. (with Sung Deuk Hahm)
- “Paying for Security: The Security-Prosperity Dilemma in the United States.” 2005. Journal of Conflict Resolution. 49(5): 792–817. (with Robert Eger)
- “Elections and Parties in South Korea Before and After Transition to Democracy." 2005. Party Politics 11(6): 675–689. (with Hans Stockton)
- “Reward, Punishment, or Inducement? US Economic and Military Aid, 1946-1996.” 2004. Defense and Peace Economics 15 (5): 453–470. (with Karl DeRouen Jr.)
- "Political Choices and Economic Outcomes: A Perspective on the Differential Impact of the Financial Crisis on South Korea and Taiwan" 2003. Comparative Political Studies 36(6): 679–698. (with Alexander C. Tan)
- “Power Parity, Alliance, Differential Growth, and Great Power Wars: An Empirical Analysis.” 2003. Armed Forces and Society 29(3): 449–460. (with Eben Christensen and Tatyana Karaman)
- "A Nested Game Approach to Political and Economic Liberalization in Democratizing States: The Case of South Korea" 2002. International Studies Quarterly 46(3): 401–422. (with Neal Jesse and Karl DeRouen Jr.)
- “Democracy and Economic Growth in Developing Countries: A Causal Analysis.” 2001. Comparative Politics 33(4): 463–473. (with Alexander Tan)
- “Modernisation and the Military in Latin America.” 2001. British Journal of Political Science 31(3): 475–496. (with Karl DeRouen Jr.)
- “The U.S.-South Korea Alliance: Free-Riding or Bargaining?” 2001. Asian Survey 41(5): 822–845. (with Jong-Sup Lee)
- “Presidents and Defense Contracting, 1953-1992.” 2001. Conflict Management and Peace Science 18(2): 109–126. (with Karl DeRouen Jr.)
- “Financial Crisis in South Korea: Failure of the Government-led Development Paradigm.” 2000. Asian Survey 40(3): 492–507. (with Sunwoong Kim)
- "Defense Contracting and Domestic Politics." 2000. Political Research Quarterly 53(4): 753–769. (with Karl DeRouen Jr.)
- “The Defense-Growth Nexus in the United States Revisited." 2000. American Politics Quarterly 28(1): 110–127.
- "Defense Spending and Economic Growth in South Korea: The Indirect Link." 1999. Journal of Peace Research 36(6): 699–708.
- "Modeling the Defense-Growth Relationship Around the Globe." 1998. Journal of Conflict Resolution 42(5):637-657.
- “Military Expenditures and Economic Growth in South Korea and Taiwan.” 1998. International Interactions 24(2): 201–16. (with Kwang H. Ro)
- "Military Expenditures, Technological Change, and Economic Growth in the East Asian NICs." 1998. Journal of Politics 60(3): 830–846. (with Karl DeRouen Jr.)
- “The Political Economy of Defense Spending in South Korea.” 1996. Journal of Peace Research 33(4): 483–490.
- “Performance, Leadership, Factions and Party Change: An Empirical Analysis.” 1995. West European Politics 18(1): 1-33. (with Robert Harmel, Alexander Tan, and Kenneth Janda)
