= Fred W. Riggs =

American academic

Fred Warren Riggs
- Born: July 3, 1917; Guling, China
- Died: February 9, 2008 (aged 90); Moanalua
- Citizenship: United States
- Education: Columbia University
- Known for: Comparative Public Administration, Riggs Award for Lifetime Achievement in International and Comparative Public Administration
- Scientific career
- Fields: Political Science, Public Administration
- Workplaces: University of Hawaii

Fred W. Riggs (July 3, 1917 in China – February 9, 2008 in USA) was an American political scientist and pioneer of comparative public administration. He has been described as "a towering figure in the field", one of the "founders of the field", and as an "energetic pioneer" in comparative research. One commentator observed in 2012 that Riggs' work "is so extensive and creative that it has become an area of study by itself."

Riggs was the founder and first chairperson of the Comparative Administration Group, which was later reorganized as the Section on International and Comparative Administration of the American Society for Public Administration. Riggs "managed the group . . . [and] provided intellectual leadership." The Comparative Administration Group undertook a large number of studies around the world in the 1960s and early 1970s that were funded by the Ford Foundation. One assessment says that the Group did "monumental work" under Riggs leadership, although not without attracting criticism.

As a theorist, Riggs was most famous for his "prismatic theory of public administration." His most influential book on this topic was Administration in Developing Countries: The Theory of Prismatic Society (1964).

A 2019 study found that Riggs was the most frequently mentioned scholar in examination questions relating to public administration posed by India's Union Public Service Commission over the preceding twenty years.

The Riggs Award for Lifetime Achievement in International and Comparative Public Administration is named in his honor. A one-day Riggs Symposium is also held as part of the annual conference of the American Society for Public Administration.

Riggs ended his career as professor emeritus at Political Science Department of University of Hawaii.

== Awards ==
Awards:

- Dwight Waldo award for lifetime achievements in Public Administration, American Society for Public Administration, April 1991.
- Order of White Elephant, conferred by King of Thailand, in Bangkok, 1986.
- First non-Asian to be honored by Eastern Regional Organization for Public Administration, EROPA Conference, Seoul, Korea, 1983.
- Fellow, Center for Advanced Study in the Behavioral Sciences, Stanford, 1966–67.
- Senior Specialist, East-West Center, University of Hawaii, 1962–1963.
- Fellow, Committee on Comparative Politics of the Social Science Research Institute, for field research in Thailand, 1957–58.
