= H. George Frederickson =

American academic (1934–2020)

H. George Frederickson (July 17, 1934 – July 24, 2020) was born in Twin Falls, Idaho. He was a generalist in the field of public administration with particular interests in public things, theories of public administration, systems of multi-level governance, and American local government. He served as the Edwin O. Stene Distinguished Professor of Public Administration at the University of Kansas. He was President Emeritus of Eastern Washington University until 1987 and served as President of the American Society for Public Administration] (ASPA). Frederickson was the founding editor of the Journal of Public Affairs Education (JPAE) and was founder and editor-in-chief of the Journal of Public Administration Research and Theory (JPART).

== Major influences on public administration ==
=== Minnowbrook II ===
- Frederickson is responsible for coordinating the second Minnowbrook Conference, Minnowbrook II, held in 1988. The conference was held at Syracuse University's conference center in the Adirondack Mountains. Lasting a total of four days, Minnowbrook II gave Frederickson and his colleagues the chance to reexamine the impacts of Minnowbrook I on the field of Public Administration.

=== Social equity ===
- In 1968 Frederickson came up with "a theory of social equity and put it forward as the "third pillar" of public administration." Frederickson was concerned that those in public administration were making the mistake of assuming that citizen A is the same as citizen B; ignoring social and economic conditions. His goal is: for social equity to take on the same "status as economy and efficiency as values or principles to which public administration should adhere."

=== Moral justification for bureaucracy ===
- In 2002 Frederickson published an article for Administration & Society, titled, "Confucius and the Moral Basis of Bureaucracy". In this article Frederickson describes the need for a "moral basis of bureaucracy" in the West. He argues, "the moral justification for bureaucracy in systems of democratic self-government is stronger in Eastern thought than in Western philosophy and practice." In this article, Frederickson describes the several "central features" of Confucianism. He then compares them to Western approaches to bureaucracy; providing "contemporary examples." These central features are: "(1) the rule of man versus the rule of law, (2) the characteristics of the good official, (3) the nature of moral conventions and their importance to governing, (4) the importance of education and merit, (5) how to serve those in power, (6) the nature and order of society, and (7) the definitions of virtue and morality."

=== High reliability organizations ===
- In the article, "Airport Security, High Reliability, and the Problem of Rationality", Frederickson "applies the concepts and logic of high reliability organizations to airport security operations". Frederickson examines both the internal and external properties of High-Reliability Organizations (HRO). He argues, after September 11, 2001, the American commercial air travel industry needs to be operated as a HRO in order to prevent future catastrophes. "For commercial air travel to be highly secure, there must be very high levels of technical competence and sustained performance, regular training, structure redundancy, collegial, decentralized authority patterns, processes that reward error discovery and correction, adequate and reliable funding, high mission valence, reliable and timely information, and protection from external interference in operations."

== Education ==
- B.A. from Brigham Young University in 1959.
- M.P.A. from the University of California at Los Angeles in 1961.
- Ph.D. from the University of Southern California in 1967.
- Honorary Doctor of Law, Dongguk University, Seoul, Korea, 1980.

== Awards ==
- Youngberg Award (Higuchi), University of Kansas
- Gaus Award, American Political Science Association
- Waldo Award, American Society of Public Administration

== Professional experience ==
- 1987 August – Current: Edwin O. Stene Distinguished Professor of Public Administration, and Courtesy Professor of Higher Education Administration The University of Kansas, Lawrence, Kansas
- 1977 January – August 1987: President and Professor of Public Affairs, Eastern Washington University, Cheney, Washington
- 1974 August – December 1976: Dean, College of Public and Community Services, University of Missouri-Columbia.
- 1973 August – August 1974: Associate Dean for Policy and Administrative Studies, School of Public and Environmental Affairs, Indiana University.
- 1972 August – August 1974: Chairman, Graduate Program, School of Public and Environmental Affairs, Indiana University.
- 1972 January – August 1972: Fellow in Higher Education Finance Administration, University of North Carolina System.
- 1971–1972: Associate Professor of Political Science (tenure), Syracuse University.
- 1970–1972: Associate Director, Metropolitan Studies Program, Maxwell School, Syracuse University.
- 1967–1971: Assistant Professor of Political Science, Maxwell School, Syracuse University.
- 1964–1966: Lecturer in Government and Politics, the University of Maryland.
- 1962–1964: Lecturer in Public Administration, University of Southern California.
- 1960–1961: Research Assistant, Bureau of Governmental Research, University of California at Los Angeles.
- 1960: Intern, Los Angeles County.

== Publications ==
=== Recent publications ===
- Up the Bureaucracy: A True and Faultless Guide to Organizational Success and the Further Adventures of Knute and Thor by H. George Frederickson. Lawrence, KS: Better Bureaucracy Press. 2005. ISBN 978-0-9769897-0-7.
- Public Administration with an Attitude by H. George Frederickson. Washington, DC: American Society for Public Administration. 2005
- Ethics in Public Administration by Richard K. Ghere and H. George Frederickson, editors. Armonk, NY: M. E. Sharpe, 2005
- The Adapted City: Institutional Dynamics and Structural Change by H. George Frederickson, Gary A. Johnson, and Curtis H. Wood. Armonk, New York: M. E. Sharpe. 2003. ISBN 978-0-7656-1264-9.
- The Public Administration Theory Primer by H. George Frederickson and Kevin B. Smith. Boulder, CO: Westview Press, 2003

=== Forthcoming publications ===
- Accountable Governance: Promises and Problems (M. E. Sharpe, forthcoming, 2011) edited by Melvin J. Dubnick and H. George Frederickson

=== Other publications ===
- To see a complete list of all publications from H. George Frederickson, including other books, monographs, symposia and special issues, articles, book chapters, major speaking, and papers presented, visit H. George Frederickson's personal website.

== Death ==
Frederickson died on July 24, 2020, in Lawrence, Kansas.
