= Pragmatism (disambiguation) =

Pragmatism is a philosophical movement.

Pragmatism or pragmatic may also refer to:

- "Pragmaticism", Charles Sanders Peirce's post-1905 branch of philosophy
- Pragmatics, a subfield of linguistics and semiotics
- Pragmatics (journal), an academic journal in the field of pragmatics
- Pragmatic ethics, a theory of normative philosophical ethics

== See also ==
- Realpolitik, politics based on practical objectives rather than on ideals, sharing realism and pragmatism
- Centrism, a political outlook opposing significant shift to the left or the right
