= Journal of Public Administration Research and Theory =

- Discipline: Public administration
- Language: English
- Edited by: Mary K. Feeney

Publication details
- History: 1991-present
- Publisher: Oxford University Press for the Public Management Research Association (United States)
- Frequency: Quarterly
- Impact factor: 7.000 (2020)

Standard abbreviations
- ISO 4: J. Public Adm. Res. Theory

Indexing
- CODEN: JPRTEC
- ISSN: 1053-1858 (print); 1477-9803 (web)
- LCCN: 91640722
- JSTOR: jpubladmiresethe
- OCLC no.: 889892582

Links
- Journal homepage; Online archive

The Journal of Public Administration Research and Theory is a quarterly peer-reviewed scientific journal covering public administration and public policy studies. It was established in 1991 and is published by Oxford University Press on behalf of the Public Management Research Association, of which it is the official journal. The editor-in-chief is Mary K. Feeney (Arizona State University). Associate Editors are: Stephan Grimmelikhuijsen (UtrechtU), Deneen Hatmaker (UConn), George Krause (UGA), Susan Miller (ASU), Michael Siciliano (UIC), David Suárez (UWash), and Anders Ryom Villadsen (AarhusU). According to the Journal Citation Reports, the journal has a 2020 impact factor of 7.000, ranking it 2nd out of 47 journals in the category "Public Administration" and #7 out of 182 in the category "Political Science". The 5-year impact factor is 8.662, with JPART ranking #1 out of 47 in Public Administration and ranked #4 out of 182 in Political Science. Previous editors include Brad Wright (UGA), Craig Thomas (UWash), Carolyn Heinrich (Vanderbilt), Beryl Radin (Georgetown), Stuart Bretschneider (ASU).

== See also ==
- List of public administration journals
