= Public service motivation =

Employee propensity to serve in governmental organizations

Public Service Motivation (PSM) refers to an individual's motivations to contribute to their community or the greater society and advance the public good through service. This concept is an important area of public administration research because it helps explain why individuals pursue careers in government and nonprofit organizations. It can also guide research on how their motivations influence workplace behavior and organizational commitment.

== Common Models ==
=== How Public Service Motivation (PSM) is Used ===
Public Service Motivation can influence how employees conduct their work and contribute to the organization's goals. It is not an approach based on pay or rewards, it emphasizes motivations such as commitment to the public interest, compassion, and the desire to contribute to their community. However, intrinsic and extrinsic rewards play a factor, and the relationship between motivation and performance can vary between individuals and organizations.

Research has examined the relationship between PSM and employee outcomes, such as job satisfaction and organizational behavior. Ritz, Brewer, and Neumann conducted a literature review of 323 publications on PSM and identified major research themes, empirical findings, and implications for public administration. These findings demonstrate the importance of understanding how PSM relates to employees and the organizations in which they work.

=== Perry's Public Service Motivation Scale ===
In 1996, James L. Perry developed a measurement scale to evaluate Public Service Motivation and examine the motivations of individuals who were pursuing careers in public service. His research identified six dimensions associated with PSM: attraction to public policy-making, commitment to the public interest, civic duty, social justice, self-sacrifice, and compassion. The scale uses survey questions to assess these dimensions and is evaluated using statistical analysis to examine reliability and validity.

This framework has become an important foundation for subsequent research on PSM. Researchers have continued to examine and develop the concept, including how individual values, social influences, and organizational environments contribute.

=== Mission Valence ===
Mission Valence can be viewed as an employee's perception of the attractiveness or salience of an organization's purpose or social contribution. Mission Valence is a concept formulated by Rainey and Steinbauer in 1999 that serves to provide a better understanding of what compels an employee to uphold and achieve goals within their organization. Mission Valence enhances the satisfaction that an individual experiences or anticipates to receive from advancing the organizational mission, and in turn, it has the "potential to influence the ability of the organization to recruit, retain, and motivate its employees." Ultimately, linking the organization's mission to the values and characteristics of the employee can increase the potential effects of PSM as members of the organization become committed to its success. Rainey and Steinbauer attribute mission valence to enhancing the satisfaction of an employee when the organization's mission or goal is achieved thus giving the employer the ability to motivate his or her employees and seek their retention. With the desire to help others, public employees are more likely to seek employment within a public organization because the particular mission of that organization often aligns with their own personal values. Previous studies enhance the notion that leadership along with effective management can increase employee mission valence through its ability to promote public service motivation.

=== Transformational Leadership ===
Transformational leadership moves away from a traditional management perspective that is based on self-interest and the exchanging of rewards for positive performance, and instead proposes the ideology of value based leadership to inspire and thus motivate employees. Although value based leadership is not new to the scope of public management, it is important to understand the evolution of how employers communicate the vision of the organization's purpose to their employees. Transformational leadership can motivate employees by appealing to their ideals and moral values, which in turn leads to a more effective and meaningful work environment. Transformational leaders create shared organizational value through "inspirational communication, ongoing practices, setting meaningful goals and designating significant work." Paarlberg and Lavigna exclaim that linking transformational leadership and public service motivation to human resource management strategies will not radically improve the outcome of the workplace, but rather steadily transform management practices to garner the best organizational outcome to better motivate public sector employees.

=== The Role of Organizations in Promoting PSM ===
The impact of organizational institutions can either have a positive or negative ramifications on the motivational attitude of employees. According to Perry and Wise, whose theories contributed to the understanding of the ongoing relationship between one's overall motivation and the public interest, provided the widely accepted definition of PSM as an individual's "predisposition to respond to motives grounded primarily or uniquely in public institutions and organizations." Under this definition, organizations have the duty and responsibility to foster an environment that allows employees to feel as if they are able to contribute to the general welfare of the public and can achieve their goals. Various scholars and researchers emphasize the role of organizations as an important aspect of PSM and indicate several factors that face employees on a regular basis that could either promote or hinder PSM. Perry and Wise specify those factors of an organization that influence PSM to include culture within an organization which can negatively be associated with PSM as hierarchical cultures tend to emphasize rule-based control of employees and bureaucratic personality, employees that experience red tape who often are characterized with lower levels of PSM as red tape includes rules regulations, and procedures that remain in force and entail a compliance burden, but do not advance the legitimate purposes the rules were intended to serve. Employees who had a lower level of job satisfaction were reported as more willing to tolerate red tape as opposed to those employees characterized with higher levels of PSM who were frustrated with the limitations of such constrictions. Educational level of organizational members reportedly had a positive relationship on the overall level of PSM of the individual. Wright, Pandey, and Moynihan emphasize that it is vital that organizational leaders understand the various factors that affect PSM in order help employees achieve their goals within the organization and provide for a better work environment.

== Studies ==
=== Fields ===
Early authors in the field of public administration described differences between public and private employees and concerns over motivating public sector employees. Paul Van Riper described the issue in his 1952 history of the U.S. civil service system. Even Woodrow Wilson's seminal 1887 essay that founded the field of Public Administration expressed concern over the performance of civil servants. Much of Max Weber's work on bureaucracy focused on similar issues. Kaufman's The Forest Ranger introduced the idea of an organizational culture unique to government employees in the 1960s, which contributed significantly to the field of study.

=== Formulation ===
The concept of Public Service Motivation developed through research that examined the differences between public and private sector employees and the factors that influence individuals to pursue public service careers. Perry and Wise (1990) formally introduced the concept as a framework for understanding motivations associated with public institutions and the public interest.

Subsequent research expands the understanding of PSM by examining its orgigins, influences, and effects. Perry (1997) investigated factors associated with PSM, including parental and religious socialization, professional identification, political ideology, and individual demographic characteristics.

Vandenabeele (2007) further developed the theoretical understanding of PSM by examining how environments and motivational psychology contribute to its development. The research considered both the causes and consequences of PSM.

=== Factors ===
Mann conducted a study among non profit employees and came to the conclusion that although there is a dichotomy within the public and private sectors - employees working for non profit organizations would be satisfied regardless of PSM or not. The reason behind this behavior is because employees who work for non profits already have a passion for the work that they do. According to Mann's study, even if these individuals didn't receive compensation, they would return to work the next day and work just as hard because they have intrinsic motivation that doesn't need to be externalized.

Previous scholars and researchers warn that PSM can also be influenced by negative factors such as institutionalized values, routinization of behaviors and skepticism about the value of the particular bureaucracy's effectiveness in promoting the public good. Budget maximization and "empire building" were also scrutinized by Downs and Niskanen.

== Factors That Influence PSM ==
=== Leadership Practices ===
Organizational leadership can influence PSM by shaping workplace culture, communicating goals, and connecting responsibilities to public interest. Leaders who establish a clear organizational mission and encourage employee investment and involvement may help employees recognize the value of their work. Research has also examined how leadership practices and the perceived importance of an organization's mission, relate to PSM and performance.

Organizational environments can also create barriers to PSM. Bureatic constraints, excessive administrative procedures, and organizational cultures can limit employees involvement and their ability to connect their work with the public interest.

=== Surface Acting ===
Studies performed by various researchers attribute an individual's motivation with the individual level of stress and job dissatisfaction. These factors can lead to surface acting which is characterized by adjusting observable emotional expressions to mask true feelings, pretending to feel a desired emotion, and faking emotional displays. It is hard to evaluate the motivation of each individual working in the public sector when they exhibit a false persona. Representing an agency or organization in the public sector often requires one to display and act in a certain behavior and attitude. This behavior often leads to surface acting.

=== Emotional Labor ===
Situational factors such as the frequency of customer interactions, the duration of such interactions, career fields, customer hostility, and organizational expectations can all contribute to one's emotional labor. Emotional labor is the act of behaving or displaying specific emotions and behaviors within one's job profession. Employees are constantly under the influence of interactions between other employees and customers. Many citizens expect a certain level of satisfaction from each level of government which often burdens the employee with an immense amount of pressure to fulfill those expectations and who in turn will often face backlash and harsh criticism when citizens feel they are not satisfied.

=== Employment Relationship ===
The relationship between employees and their organizations can influence PSM. Factors such as workplace culture, communication, employee involvement, and opportunutes for professional development may affect how an employees personal values connect with the organizational goals. Research on PSM has also examined relationships between employees motivations and job satisfaction, suggesting that PSM can be associated with greater satisfaction in public employment, fulfilling an individual's prosocial needs.

== See also ==
- Altruism
- Bureaucracy
- Public Service
- New Public Management
- Public Sector
- Civil Service
- Government Agency
- Emotional Labor
- Emotion Work
- Customer Relationship Management
