= Network of Schools of Public Policy, Affairs, and Administration =

International organization of public policy schools

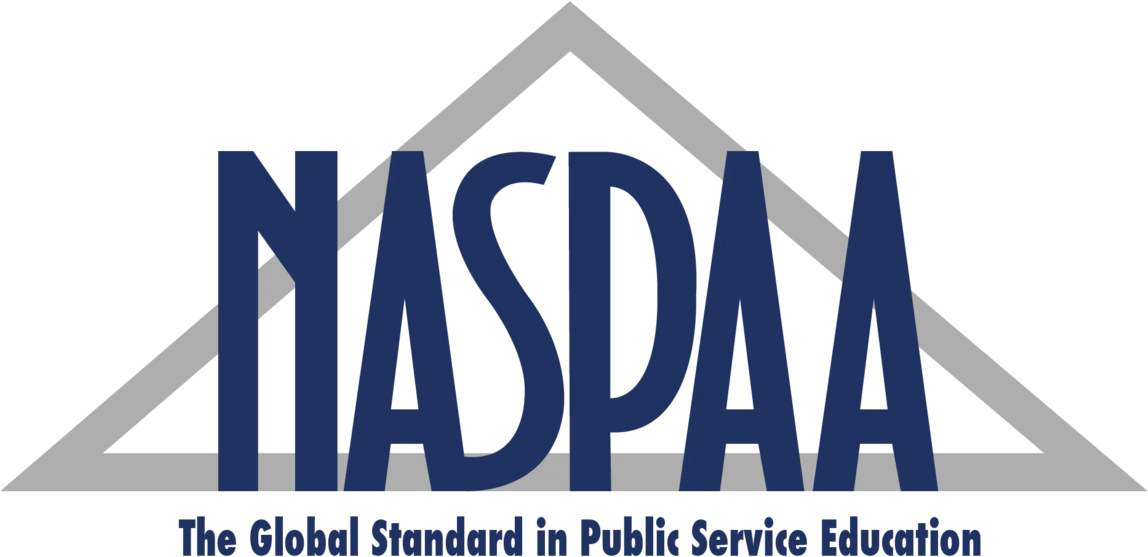
- Abbreviation: NASPAA
- Formation: 1970
- Type: NGO
- Purpose: Educational accreditation
- Headquarters: Washington, DC
- Website: naspaa.org

The Network of Schools of Public Policy, Affairs, and Administration (NASPAA) is a Washington, D.C.–based non-profit organization. It is an international association and accreditation body of public affairs schools also known as schools of public policy and administration at universities in the United States and abroad. NASPAA is also the sole body in the United States recognized by the Council for Higher Education Accreditation (CHEA) as the accreditor of master's degree programs in public policy (MPP), public affairs (MPAff), and public administration (MPA). Its stated mission is to "ensure excellence in education and training for public service and to promote the ideal of public service." It administers the honor society Pi Alpha Alpha.

== History and mission ==
Founded in 1970, NASPAA serves as a national and international resource for the promotion of excellence in education for the public service. Its institutional membership includes more than 280 university programs in the United States in public administration, policy, and management. NASPAA is also the accreditator of its member schools, seeking to promote the quality of education. It accomplishes its purposes through direct services to its member institutions and by:

- Developing and administering appropriate standards for educational programs in public affairs through its Executive Council and its Commission on Peer Review and Accreditation;
- Representing to governments and other institutions the objectives and needs of education for public affairs and administration;
- Encouraging curriculum development and innovation and providing a forum for publication and discussion of education scholarship, practices, and issues;
- Undertaking surveys that provide members and the public with information on key educational issues;
- Meeting with employers to promote internship and employment for students and graduates;
- Undertaking joint educational projects with practitioner professional organizations; and
- Collaborating with institutes and schools of public administration in other countries through conferences, consortia, and joint projects.

NASPAA provides opportunities for international engagement for NASPAA members, placing a global emphasis on educational quality and quality assurance through a series of networked international initiatives, in particular the Network of Institutes and Schools of Public Administration in Central and Eastern Europe (NISPAcee), the Inter-American Network of Public Administration Education (INPAE), and the Georgian Institute of Public Affairs (GIPA). It is also involved locally, directing the Small Communities Outreach Project for Environmental Issues, which networks public affairs schools and local governments around environmental regulation policy issues, with support from the Environmental Protection Agency.

In 2013, NASPAA changed its name from the National Association of Schools of Public Affairs and Administration to the Network of Schools of Public Policy, Affairs, and Administration to reflect its "growing international membership and disciplinary breadth."

== Journal of Public Affairs Education ==
The Journal of Public Affairs Education (JPAE) is a quarterly, peer-reviewed, academic journal of public administration education that is published by Taylor & Francis on behalf of the Network of Schools of Public Policy, Affairs, and Administration. The journal was established in 1995, and has been edited by Sara Rinfret (Northern Arizona University) and Sarah Young (Kennesaw State University) since 2024.

The Journal of Public Administration Education was founded in 1995 by H. George Frederickson. Initially published in coordination with the American Society for Public Administration's Section on Public Administration Education (SPAE), the National Association of Schools of Public Affairs and Administration (NASPAA) began discussions in 1996 of sponsoring the journal. In the fall of 1997, Frederickson transferred ownership of the journal to NASPAA. Under the new ownership, NASPAA elected to change the name of the journal to the Journal of Public Affairs Education to reflect the breadth of the NASPAA's mission and to increase the appeal of the journal. Despite the change in name ownership, the journal has continued to maintain a loose affiliation with SPAE.

After taking ownership of the journal, JPAE was self-published by NASPAA; however, in 2017 a publishing agreement was reached between NASPAA and Taylor & Francis. Since January 2018, Taylor & Francis has overseen the production and distribution of the journal.

== Criticisms ==
NASPAA has been criticized for describing itself as a global organization and a global standard-setter when its membership and governance bodies are dominated by American institutions. It has also been criticized for neglecting democratic values. Critics have said that NASPAA lacks policies or standards on academic freedom, democratic values, and human rights, and that it has accredited state-controlled programs in authoritarian countries without considering academic freedom. In 2025, NASPAA filed an anonymized complaint with Taylor & Francis, seeking retraction of an article written by Professor Alasdair Roberts that was critical of the organization. After a five-month investigation, Taylor & Francis concluded there was no basis for retraction and no significant corrections to the article were necessary.
