= American Society for Public Administration =

American nonprofit organization

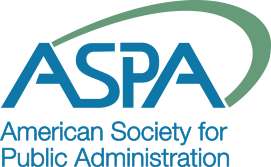
- Abbreviation: ASPA
- Founded: 1939
- Tax ID no.: 36-2340300
- Legal status: 501(c)(3) nonprofit organization
- Headquarters: Washington, D.C.
- Coordinates: 38.8965634°N 77.0301249°W
- Services: National conference; program and service development; membership; and education and training.
- President: Alan Rosenbaum
- Executive Director: William P. Shields Jr.
- Subsidiaries: ASPA Endowment
- Revenue: $1,500,939 (2019)
- Expenses: $1,519,989 (2019)
- Employees: 8 (2020)
- Website: www.aspanet.org

American Society for Public Administration (ASPA) is a membership association of almost 10,000 professionals in the United States sponsoring conferences and providing professional services primarily to those who study the implementation of government policy, public administration, and, to a lesser degree, programs of civil society. Its annual conference is an important meeting for those interested in bureaucracy, civic engagement, program evaluation, public management and other public administration topics, such as budgeting and budget theory, government strategic planning, policy analysis, contract administration, personnel management, and related topics.

American Society for Public Administration was founded in 1939, following growing concerns about the management of federal government and the report of the Brownlow Committee. It was formally incorporated on September 13, 1945.

American Society for Public Administration owns the journals Public Administration Review and Public Integrity and sponsors several others via its subject-matter Sections, including Journal of Health and Human Services Administration, Public Budgeting & Finance, and others.

== History ==
American Society for Public Administration was founded in 1939 by Louis Brownlow, William E. Mosher, Donald C. Stone, Charles A. Beard, Harold D. Smith, Luther Gulick, and others. During its early years, American Society for Public Administration was housed in the Public Administration Clearing House (PACH) in Chicago.

Significant events in American Society for Public Administration's history include:

- Sponsorship of Public Administration Review since 1939.
- After a developmental grant from the Ford Foundation in 1956, independence from PACH.
- A move of the headquarters to Washington, D.C., in 1964.
- Establishment of the National Academy of Public Administration (NAPA) as part of ASPA in 1967, and formal separation of NAPA from ASPA in 1970.
- Reformulation of ASPA's Council on Graduate Education for Public Administration to the National Association of Schools of Public Affairs and Administration (NASPAA) within ASPA in 1970, and formal separation of NASPAA from ASPA in 1975.
- In 1981, creation with NAPA of National Public Service Awards.
- A 50th Anniversary Conference in 1990.
- Approval of the American Society for Public Administration Code of Ethics in 1994.

American Society for Public Administration's membership declined from about 14,000 members in 1990 to 8,383 members in 2007. However, during that period the Society took "steps to address its most serious issues: attracting and retaining members, dealing with structure and funding, developing a coherent mission, strengthening chapters and sections, sponsoring successful conferences, enhancing its publication offerings, and working effectively with other organizations concerned with public administration and public service." American Society for Public Administration membership was affected by the tendency of government to hire local governmental personnel, and the change from government provision of services to contracting to the private and non-profit sectors. However, the field of public administration is the sole academic field given the responsibility for areas ranging from government budgeting at the United States budget levels, community development throughout all localities and states in the United States, and personnel management of all United States workforces, among others.

== Programs ==
ASPA Annual Conference is a yearly conference held to connect administrators and scholars from across the globe to share experiences and information with one another. There are a series of guest panelists and presentations that are presented during this event.

The Founders' Fellows Program was launched in the early 2000s; it was created for early young professionals entering the field of public service. The program contains a series of developmental webinars, mentorships and other events they must attend. The fellows present their research from this event at the Annual Conference and submit a paper that is related to their area of expertise, which will then be published in the online PA TIMES. It was originally open to graduate students, but the fellowship program has since then expanded to include new administrators entering the field. In 2015, the program had a change in content and now the fellows compete in year-long mentoring and webinar sessions.

== Awards ==
American Society for Public Administration sponsors more than 20 awards for public administration practitioners and scholars, of which the longest-running are the Dwight Waldo and Charles Levine awards. Find the full list of its awards on its website.

=== Dwight Waldo Award ===
The Dwight Waldo Award is presented to individuals "who have made outstanding contributions to the professional literature of public administration over an extended career."

=== Charles Levine Award ===
The Charles Levine Memorial Award for Excellence in Public Administration is presented jointly by American Society for Public Administration and the National Association of Schools of Public Affairs and Administration to "a public administration faculty member who has demonstrated excellence in three major areas of the field of teaching, research and service to the wider community."

=== Louis Brownlow Award ===
The Louis Brownlow Award is presented by ASPA for the best Public Administration Review article written by a practitioner.

=== Riggs Award for Lifetime Achievement in International and Comparative Public Administration ===
Since 1986, the Riggs Award for Lifetime Achievement in International and Comparative Public Administration has been awarded annually by the ASPA Section on International and Comparative Administration. It is named in honor of Fred W. Riggs, a pioneer of comparative public administration.

== See also ==
- Good government organizations in the United States
