= Discretionary Time =

2008 book by Robert E. Goodin, James Mahmud Rice, Antti Parpo and Lina Eriksson

- Front cover
- Authors: Robert E. Goodin, James Mahmud Rice, Antti Parpo and Lina Eriksson
- Cover artist: El Lissitzky
- Language: English
- Subject: Leisure, politics, quality of life, sociology, time, well-being
- Genre: Nonfiction
- Publisher: Cambridge University Press
- Publication date: February 2008
- Media type: Print (hardback, paperback), e-book
- Pages: 484
- Awards: Stein Rokkan Prize for Comparative Social Science Research
- ISBN: 978-0-521-70951-4 (paperback)
- OCLC: 171110399
- Dewey Decimal: 306.0723
- LC Class: HN25 .D57 2008
- Website: www.cambridge.org/9780521709514

Discretionary Time: A New Measure of Freedom is a nonfiction book written by Robert E. Goodin, James Mahmud Rice, Antti Parpo and Lina Eriksson. It was published by Cambridge University Press in 2008. The book develops a new measure of temporal autonomy, which is the freedom to spend one's time as one pleases. Based on data from six countries – the United States, Australia, Germany, France, Sweden and Finland – the book then describes how temporal autonomy varies under different welfare, gender and household arrangements.

Goodin, Rice, Parpo and Eriksson were awarded the 2009 Stein Rokkan Prize for Comparative Social Science Research in recognition of the substantial and original contribution of Discretionary Time.

== Themes ==
The book focuses on "discretionary time" as a measure of "temporal autonomy" and on inequalities in "discretionary time" between and within different countries. The book blends analytical considerations with statistical research that focuses on six countries that embody different types of welfare and gender regimes. The United States and Australia represent liberal welfare regimes and individualist gender regimes. Germany and France represent corporatist welfare regimes and traditionalist gender regimes. Sweden and Finland represent social-democratic welfare regimes and female-friendly gender regimes.

=== Time and money ===
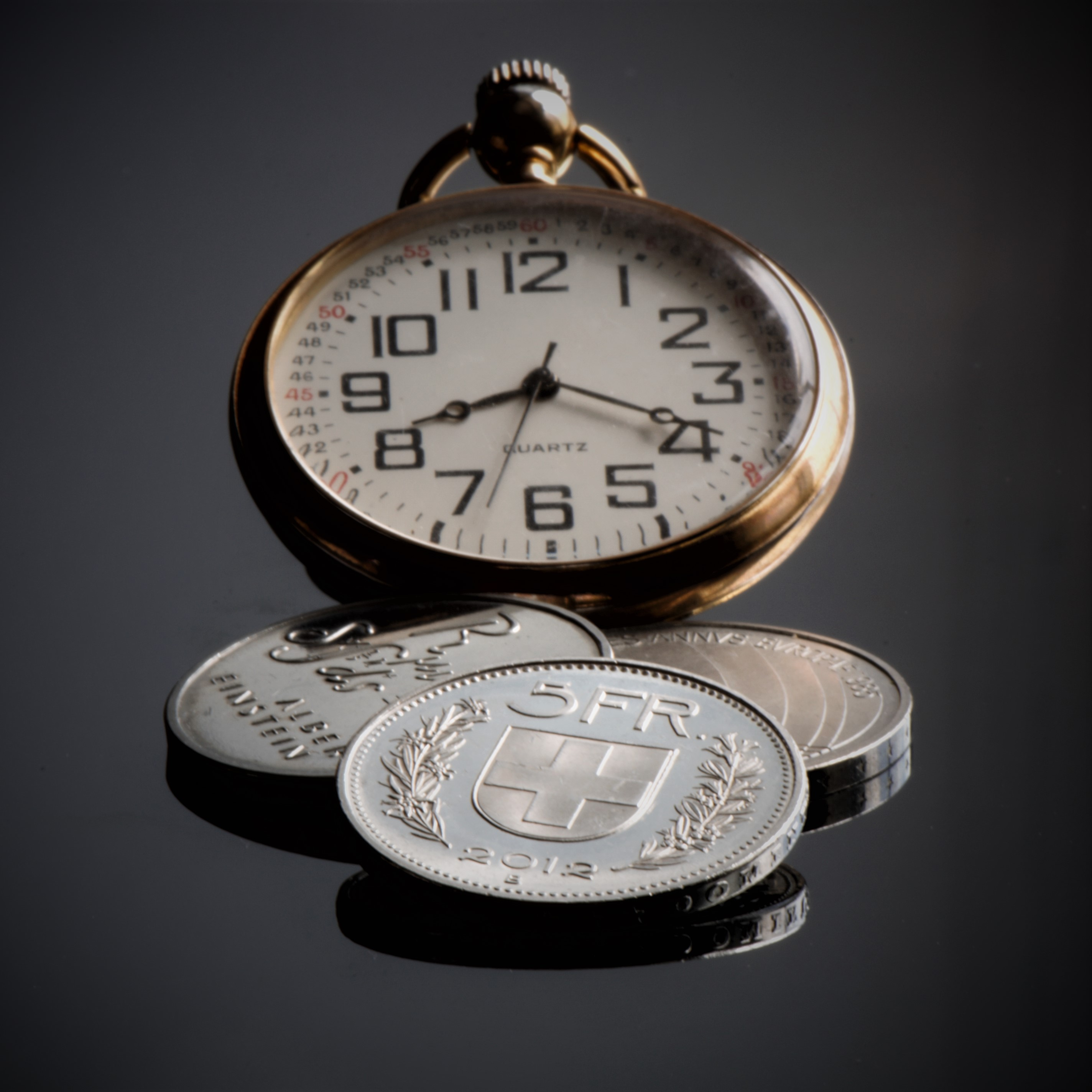
Time and money.

Time, the book claims, has a special combination of characteristics that renders it a particularly appropriate metric of egalitarian justice: it is inherently egalitarian, it is inherently scarce and it is a necessary input into any human activity. The book proposes inverting the typical practice of valuing time in terms of money and instead valuing money in terms of the time required to earn it.

=== Temporal autonomy and discretionary time ===
The book's arguments are built around the idea that the ability to choose how one spends one's time lies at the foundation of a notion of freedom. According to the book:

When we say that someone 'has more time' than someone else, we do not mean that she has literally a twenty-fifth hour in her day. Rather, we mean to say that she has fewer constraints and more choices in how she can choose to spend her time. She has more 'autonomous control' over her own time. 'Temporal autonomy' is a matter of having 'discretionary control' over your time.

"Discretionary time" is the book's measure of temporal autonomy. The book argues that one antonym of "autonomy" is "necessity". Acting from necessity entails a lack of choice. Discretionary time is time that is not constrained by the necessities of life.

A person's discretionary time is operationalised as the time that person has left over once he or she has done what is necessary in paid labour, unpaid household labour and personal care. The operationalisation of necessity here draws on conventions used in poverty research and is based on relative social standards rather than absolute ones. Necessary time in paid labour is determined by asking how much time a person needs to spend in income-producing activities to be just above the poverty line, defined in relative terms. Necessary time in unpaid household labour and personal care are determined in analogous ways.

Statistical analysis reveals differences in average discretionary time across welfare states, genders and household situations. Average discretionary time ranges from 76 hours per week in France to 85 hours per week in Sweden, for example. In all the countries under analysis, men enjoy more discretionary time than women. Within each country, people's discretionary time depends mostly on whether they have a partner and children. On average people in couples without children have the most discretionary time, followed by couples with children and singles. Lone parents have the least discretionary time.

=== Time pressure ===
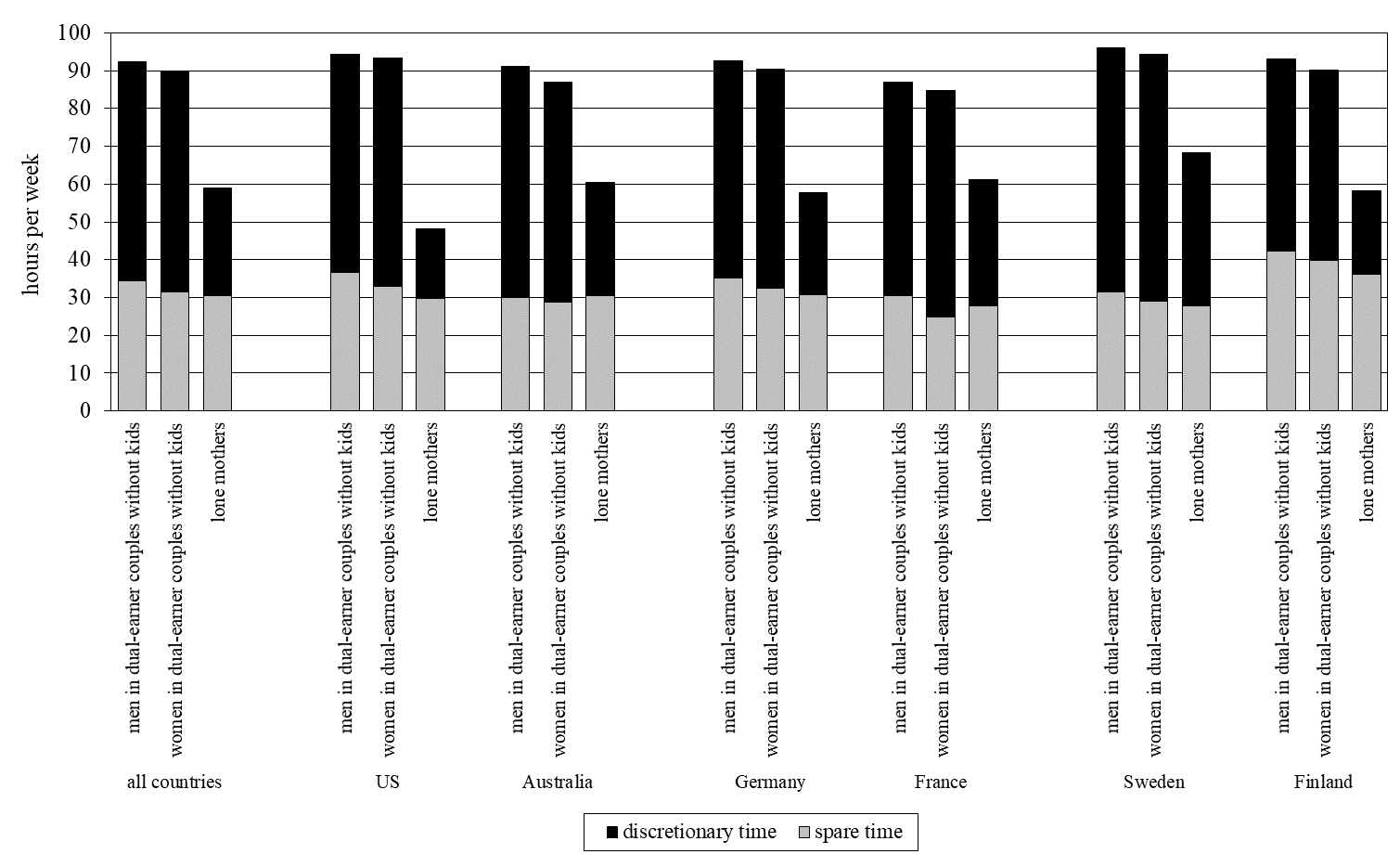
The difference between households with the most and least time pressure.

The book highlights the substantial difference between discretionary time on the one hand and "spare time" (or "free time" or "leisure") on the other. Discretionary time is the time a person has left over after subtracting the time that person needs to spend in paid labour, unpaid household labour and personal care. In contrast, spare time is the time a person has left over after subtracting the time that person actually spends in these three types of activities. The difference between discretionary time and spare time relates to the difference between necessary time and actual time in an activity.

Time pressure is one of the issues on which the book distinguishes itself from prior theoretical and empirical work. A conventional approach in time-use research is to state that people with less spare time are under more time pressure. The book contrasts this approach with one that states that people with less discretionary time are under more time pressure.

The book draws attention to the difference between people who are time-pressured, as indicated by low amounts of discretionary time, and people who are time-pressured, as indicated by low amounts of spare time. On the one hand, there are people who do not have the time to meet the basic necessities of life. On the other hand, there are people who have low amounts of spare time because they choose to spend additional time in paid labour, unpaid household labour and personal care in order to experience more than the basic necessities of life.

The book illustrates this distinction by comparing dual-earners without children and lone mothers (see chart). In terms of their spare time, dual-earners without children and lone mothers appear similar. Observing only spare time, it would seem that dual-earners without children are just as time-pressured as lone mothers. In terms of discretionary time, however, the two groups differ dramatically. Focusing on discretionary time, lone mothers are much more time-pressured than dual-earners without children. The time pressure experienced by lone mothers is much more the result of necessity and much less the result of choice.

=== Welfare regimes ===
Subsequent parts of the book focus on three aspects of society that shape the temporal autonomy that people experience: welfare regimes, gender regimes and household regimes.

Concerning welfare regimes, the book argues that:

There is ... much that the state can do to ease or exacerbate time pressures that people would otherwise suffer. Of course, what the state transfers to people is not time itself, directly. Rather, it transfers money, goods and services, which have the effect of altering the amount of time that people would otherwise have to spend in pursuit of those things.

The book estimates that people have more discretionary time in social-democratic Sweden and Finland than in the liberal United States and Australia and corporatist Germany and France. Among other findings, the book shows that state intervention in the form of taxation, transfer payments and childcare subsidies has a negative effect on the discretionary time of people with children in the liberal United States and Australia. In contrast, state intervention has a positive effect on the discretionary time of people with children in social-democratic Sweden and Finland. In Germany state intervention has a negative effect on people with children (like the United States and Australia), while in France the effect is positive (like Sweden and Finland). In all the countries under analysis, state intervention has a negative effect on the discretionary time of people without children.

=== Gender regimes ===
On gender regimes, the book examines how gender regimes influence the temporal autonomy experienced by women and men. The book finds that in all the countries under analysis men enjoy more discretionary time than women. However, this inequality would be higher were it not for state intervention in the form of taxation, transfer payments and childcare subsidies.

In relation to discretionary time there are also variations across gender regimes concerning which kinds of mother they assist. As expected, traditionalist Germany and France encourage married mothers to stay at home, female-friendly Sweden encourages married mothers into paid employment and individualist Australia is neutral with respect to the paid employment of married mothers. Contrary to expectations, Finland (like Australia) is neutral with respect to the paid employment of married mothers, while the United States (like Germany and France) encourages married mothers to stay at home. In contrast, all countries are supportive of lone mothers with one exception: Germany sanctions rather than supports lone mothers.

=== Household regimes ===
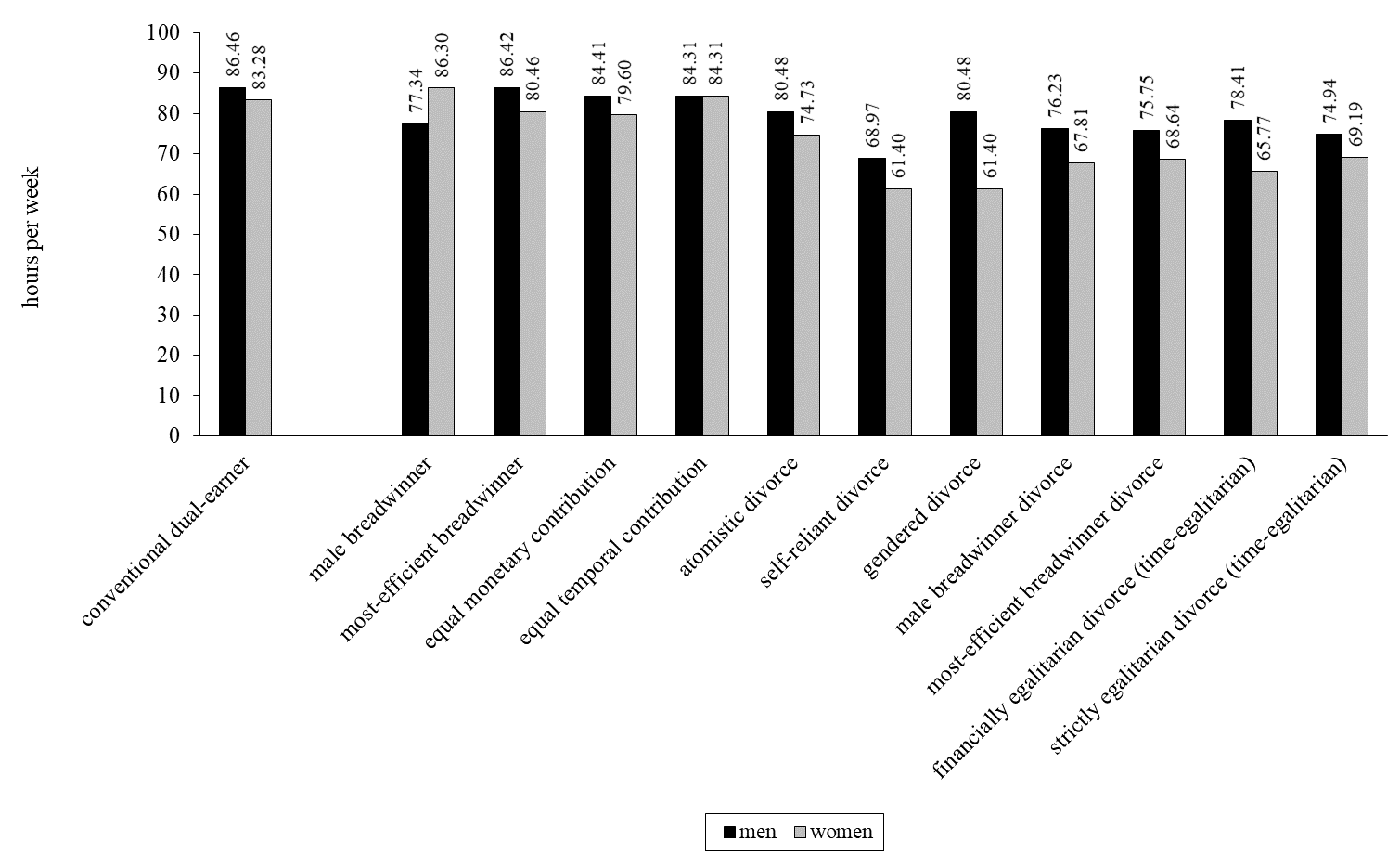
Effect of alternative household rules on discretionary time, by gender.

The book also analyses how people's temporal autonomy is shaped by household regimes, meaning the ways in which paid labour and unpaid household labour are divided between adults within households. Four broad groups of household rules for dividing paid and unpaid household labour are identified: breadwinner rules, conventional dual-earner rules, egalitarian rules and withdrawal (or divorce) rules. The book shows that the rules that govern family life matter. This is particularly true for divorce and the rules under which divorces are governed (see chart).

== Awards ==
In recognition of the substantial and original contribution of Discretionary Time, Goodin, Rice, Parpo and Eriksson were awarded the 2009 Stein Rokkan Prize for Comparative Social Science Research. In the prize laudation the prize jury described the book in the following terms:

... Discretionary Time shifts the emphasis of welfare state analysis from money to time in a highly original way. The book is not only a pleasure to read and a masterpiece in comparative secondary data analysis, it is also an eye-opener which generates empirically novel and conceptually innovative perspectives on welfare regimes, gender regimes and household regimes.

== Reception ==
In the Financial Times Stephen Cave described Discretionary Time as full of insights. Writing in Feminist Economics Valeria Esquivel described Discretionary Time as "... a carefully thought-out and crafted book with strong conceptual and methodological contributions indeed". Jennifer Whillans wrote in Time & Society that Discretionary Time "... demonstrates originality in conceptualizing and theoretical grounding in relation to time poverty and welfare", while in the journal Managing Leisure Jonathan Long wrote that Discretionary Time "... makes fascinating reading and invites further questions".

Michael Bittman wrote in Social Indicators Research that Discretionary Time is "... built around a powerful central idea, namely that the ability to choose how you allocate your time lies at the core of a positive notion of freedom" and that the book "... provides an important improvement to the common practice of comparing populations by the amount of 'free time' that remains after deducting time actually allocated to paid work, unpaid work and personal care". Bittman was less convinced, however, by the detail of how necessary time is determined, particularly in relation to unpaid household labour and personal care.

Writing in Economics & Philosophy Sebastiano Bavetta described Discretionary Time as "... a carefully blended mixture of analytical considerations and statistical research; a blend which should be a model for whoever wishes to take social policy analysis seriously". Bavetta expressed some uneasiness, however, with the interpretation of autonomy contained in the book, which he argued fails to account for the psychological process of decision making. Despite reservations about some parts of the book, Jason Ferrell wrote in Political Studies Review that Discretionary Time's "... attempt to render the idea of autonomy more determinate by measuring the amount of time individuals control is a striking endeavour, and one that bears more than a cursory read".

Entrepreneur Magazine cited Discretionary Time in explaining that the popular phrase that someone "has more time" does not mean that they literally have an extra hour in the day. Instead, they explain that it means they in fact have more discretionary time.

== Publication ==
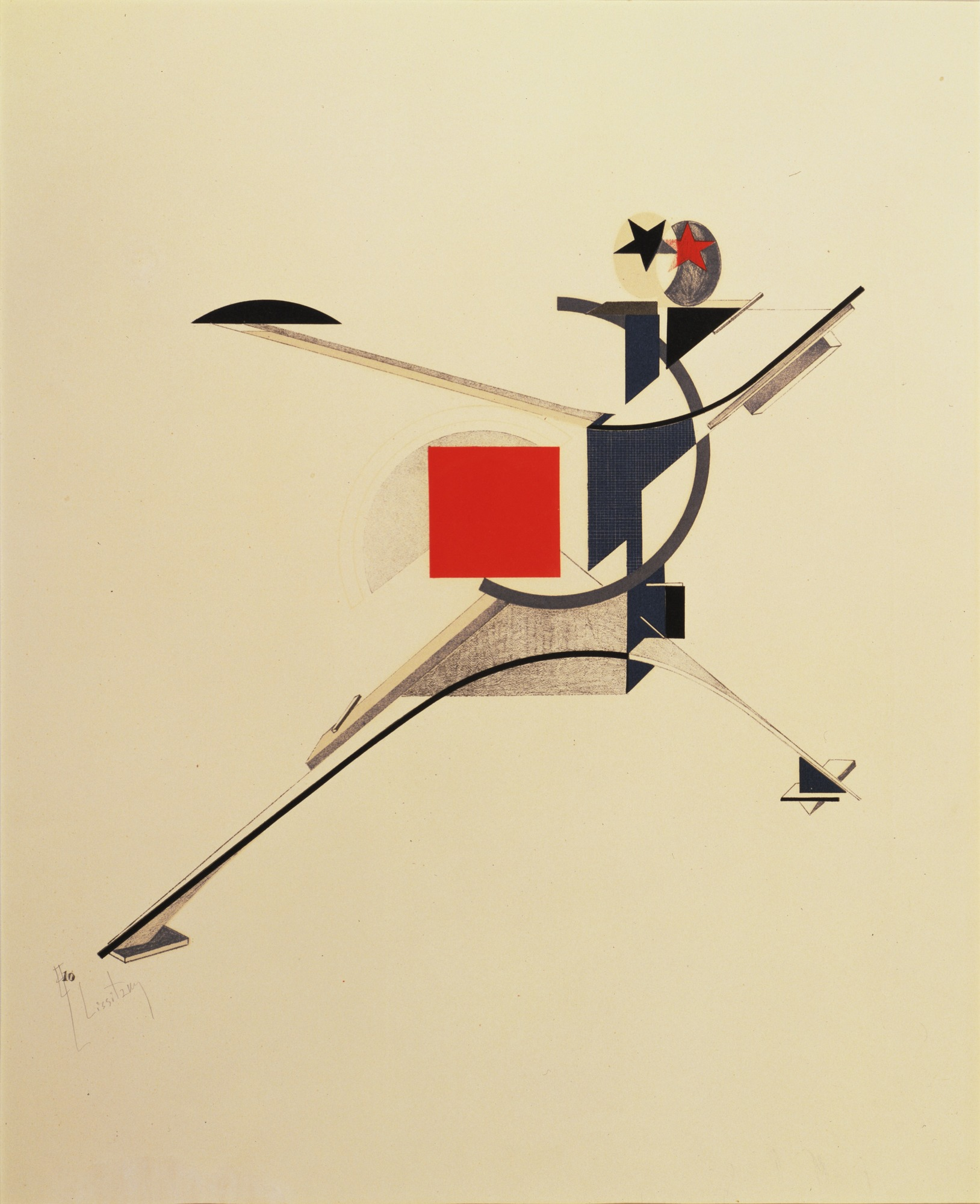
El Lissitzky. New Man from the portfolio Victory over the Sun. 1923. Lithograph.

Cambridge University Press has published Discretionary Time as a hardback, a paperback and an e-book. The hardback (ISBN 978-0-521-88298-9) was published in February 2008. The paperback (ISBN 978-0-521-70951-4) followed soon afterwards in March 2008. The e-book (ISBN 978-0-511-61145-2; DOI: 10.1017/CBO9780511611452) was published in October 2009.

The front cover of Discretionary Time features New Man, a lithograph by El Lissitzky from the portfolio Victory over the Sun (1923).

== See also ==
- Autonomy
- Division of labour
- Downshifting (lifestyle)
- Economic freedom
- Leisure
- Simple living
- Welfare state
