= Welfare in Peru =

Welfare in Peru began on a base of democratic views. Its political system is a multi-party system that includes having a President and Prime Minister. The economy of Peru has expanded substantially throughout the years making it one of the fastest growing economies. As described by Gøsta Esping-Andersen, in his book The Three Worlds of Welfare Capitalism, the Peruvian welfare system would most commonly fit in with the liberal model, since Peru mostly attempts to emancipate the less fortunate from poverty, through means of state-cultivated programs. In accordance, the welfare system has shown great expansion, with the focus primarily on education, healthcare, and the creation of a social safety net.

== Healthcare ==
The Peruvian healthcare system is decentralized and composed of five entities charged with its administration. These five entities are made up of The Ministry of Health (also known as MINSA), which provides for about 60% of the population. Then there is EsSalud, which covers 30% of the population, and the approximate 10% left is collectively provided for by the Armed Forces (FFAA), the National Police and private sectors. Peru has struggled with disparity on the various facets of health coverage, such as the gap between providing services to the rich versus the poor, and access to healthcare facility locations. Despite these setbacks, the evolution of healthcare was marked as a major and influential recovery of private and public expenditures in healthcare. Continuing in pursuit of equity, Peru has managed to achieve high levels of coverage in basic healthcare, with the creation of programs, but while coverage is high, the quality of these remains relatively low.

== Education ==
Education in Peru is overseen by Ministry of Education and consists of primary, secondary and tertiary education. The first two are compulsory and the latter equal to higher education. Since education is said to be an important factor of production, investment in education facilitates equality and opportunity. The Peruvian government has ventured towards decreasing the lingering unequal opportunity in obtaining education by creating programs like BECA 18, which helps youths from poor families attend school, and Jóvenes productive y double oportunidad, which aims to help school leavers get back into school. These programs are attempting to widen access to education and help in expanding the economy.

=== Vocational training ===
According to the OECD's review of vocational training and education, Peru is seen as a rapidly progressing country with respect to education and training programs. Peru has a vast array of vocational training programs that aim to teach workers job-specific skills. Since these skills are commended by employers, these programs obtain strong support from them.

== Unemployment ==
Unemployment benefits are not required by law to be dispersed by the government, but should be given out by private-sector employers in the form of severance pay. In the case of Peru, severance pay is distributed in the event of wrongful termination. Peru is also one of the countries that have set a limit on severance pay. While most payments come out of companies' internal funds, there are cases in which countries have individual external accounts. In Peru, this is called Compensation for time of service (CTS). CTS can also be seen as a method of forced savings or funds put away by employers that hire workers to work four or more hours a day. CTS is distributed as a result of termination or migration to a new job.

== Other forms of social protection ==
=== Pensions ===
Pensions in Peru consist of social insurance (SNP) and the Individual account, both of which cover public or private sector employees. The average pension in 2014 was $984 soles (about US$350) per month and paid only to those holding a certain balance in their personal bank accounts. Pensions are looked after by the Ministry of Economy and Finance, and are given to elderly citizens over the age of 65 who have contributed at least 20 years to the labour market.

==== Pension65 ====
Pension65 was a program created to respond to the growing vulnerable population, mainly those living in poverty, with a distribution of generally $250 soles (about the US$77.31) every two months for every qualifying citizen.

==== Social insurance ====
Within SNP, an insured individual may receive as much as 13% of gross earnings, a non-insured person (self-employed) will receive 13% of gross declared income. To receive old-age pensions a citizen is required to be at least 65 years old and must have contributed 20 years of contributions. The early pension differs depending on the gender, men have to be at leasy 55 years old with at least 30 years of contribution and women are required to at least be 50 with 25 years of contributions. The disability pension is only given to persons who had been employed when the disability began and can require anywhere between three and fifteen years of contributions. Survivor pension means that the insured received or qualified to receive a pension, eligible survivors to receive pensions are limited but can include widowers and children under the age of 18.

==== Individual account ====
The SPP is fairly similar to social insurance with some distinctions. To obtain SPP, one can obtain distributions at the age of 65 or when the individual account has reached 50% of indexed earnings. The disability pension is paid so long as the insured party has lost at least 50% of total income and cannot qualify to obtain old-age pension. Survivor pension can be distributed to a widow or partner and children under the age of 18.

=== Cash transfers ===
JUNTOS is Peru's conditional cash transfer program that began in 2005 and has grown exponentially, approximately reaching 37,000 families in need. Similar to many cash transfer programs, JUNTOS objective lies in minimizing poverty through cash dispersion and ultimately, over time, to stop the passing of poverty down the generations by improving human capital through equal access to education and healthcare.

JUNTOS holds conditions one must meet to receive the benefit, which is non-differentiated throughout households (all households get the same amount of cash transfer, $10 soles, approximately US$30). Conditions may be but are not limited to, children maintaining health and nutrition and attending school for a certain time each year. It can also include being in the lower part of the poverty gap, belonging to a very poor demographic, and being exposed to a dangerous or violent environment.

Peruvian cash transfers can be correlated to the process of commodification, alienating those from market dependency, by providing income regardless of employment.

== See also ==
- Possible Peru
- Welfare state
