= James Mahmud Rice =

Australian sociologist

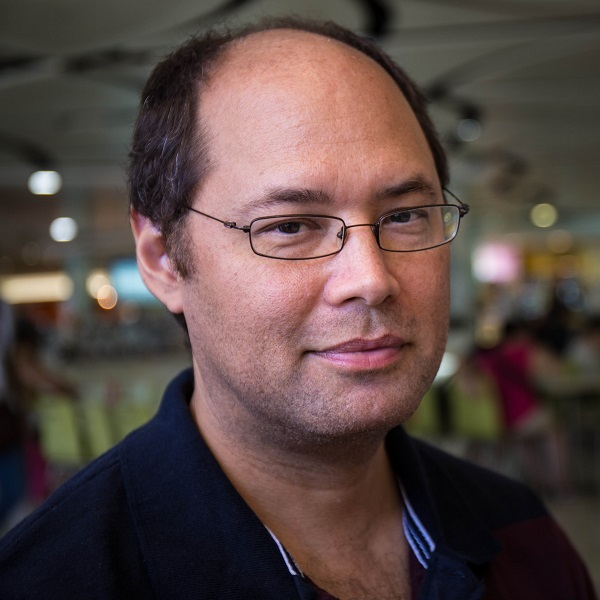
- Born: 1972 (age 53–54); Honolulu, Hawaii, US
- Citizenship: Australia; United States
- Awards: Stein Rokkan Prize for Comparative Social Science Research (2009)

Academic work
- Discipline: Sociologist
- Institutions: University of New South Wales; Australian National University
- Website: www.jamesmahmudrice.info

James Mahmud Rice (born 1972) is an Australian sociologist in the Demography and Ageing Unit, Melbourne School of Population and Global Health, University of Melbourne. He works at the intersection of sociology, economics, and political science, focusing in particular on inequalities in the distribution of economic resources such as income and time and how private and public conventions and institutions shape these inequalities.

== Early life ==
Rice was born in 1972 in Honolulu, Hawaii. His mother was a Minangkabau woman from Medan, North Sumatra. His father, who was born in Ann Arbor, Michigan, was an economist who taught economics at the University of Hawaii and Monash University, in addition to conducting a large number of consultancies in Indonesia.

== Research ==
=== Housework and domestic appliances ===
Whether domestic appliances designed to save time on housework, like dishwashers, microwave ovens, deep freezers, and clothes dryers, actually do save time has been examined in research by Michael Bittman, James Mahmud Rice, and Judy Wajcman. According to this research these appliances rarely reduce the amount of time people spend on housework and can, in some cases, increase this time. These appliances also have little impact on the traditional division of housework between men and women. When appliances do cut time on housework, it is generally men who benefit rather than women. One explanation offered as to why appliances rarely reduce time on housework is that people use appliances to increase housework standards – for example, to cook more or better meals or to produce cleaner clothes – rather than to save time.

=== Discretionary time and temporal autonomy ===
Following the publication of a series of articles on time, autonomy, the welfare state, life satisfaction, and time pressure, a book on these topics was published by Cambridge University Press in 2008. Written by Robert E. Goodin, James Mahmud Rice, Antti Parpo, and Lina Eriksson, the book – Discretionary Time: A New Measure of Freedom – develops a new measure of temporal autonomy, which is the freedom to spend one's time as one pleases. Based on data from six countries – the United States, Australia, Germany, France, Sweden, and Finland – the book then describes how temporal autonomy varies under different welfare, gender, and household arrangements.

Goodin, Rice, Parpo, and Eriksson were awarded the 2009 Stein Rokkan Prize for Comparative Social Science Research in recognition of the substantial and original contribution of Discretionary Time.

=== Low fertility and standards of living ===
How low fertility influences standards of living is examined in research published in Science by Ronald Lee, Andrew Mason, James Mahmud Rice, and other members of the National Transfer Accounts Network. This research indicates, on the basis of an analysis of data from 40 countries, that typically fertility well above replacement and population growth would be most beneficial for government budgets. Fertility near replacement and population stability, however, would be most beneficial for standards of living when the analysis includes the effects of age structure on families as well as governments. Fertility moderately below replacement and population decline would maximize standards of living when the cost of providing capital for a growing labour force is taken into account.

== Awards and honours ==
In 2009 Rice was awarded the Stein Rokkan Prize for Comparative Social Science Research, together with Robert E. Goodin, Antti Parpo, and Lina Eriksson. The prize was awarded for their book Discretionary Time: A New Measure of Freedom.

== Selected bibliography ==
=== Books and reports ===
- Goodin, Robert E.; Rice, James Mahmud; Parpo, Antti; Eriksson, Lina (2008). Discretionary Time: A New Measure of Freedom. Cambridge: Cambridge University Press. ISBN 978-0-521-70951-4. S2CID 154300822.
- Rice, James Mahmud; Temple, Jeromey; McDonald, Peter (2014). National Transfer Accounts for Australia: 2003–04 and 2009–10 Detailed Results (PDF). ARC Centre of Excellence in Population Ageing Research and Crawford School of Public Policy, Australian National University. S2CID 153412815.

=== Journal articles ===
- Bittman, Michael; Rice, James Mahmud; Wajcman, Judy (2004). "Appliances and their impact: The ownership of domestic technology and time spent on household work". The British Journal of Sociology. 55 (3): 401–423. doi:10.1111/j.1468-4446.2004.00026.x. hdl:1959.4/34267. PMID 15383094. S2CID 29449833.
- Goodin, Robert E.; Rice, James Mahmud; Bittman, Michael; Saunders, Peter (2005). "The time-pressure illusion: Discretionary time vs free time". Social Indicators Research. 73 (1): 43–70. doi:10.1007/s11205-004-4642-9. S2CID 145083451.
- Rice, James Mahmud; Goodin, Robert E.; Parpo, Antti (2006). "The temporal welfare state: A crossnational comparison" (PDF). Journal of Public Policy. 26 (3): 195–228. doi:10.1017/S0143814X06000523. hdl:10419/31604. S2CID 38187155.
- Lee, Ronald; Mason, Andrew; members of the NTA Network (including James Mahmud Rice) (2014). "Is low fertility really a problem? Population aging, dependency, and consumption". Science. 346 (6206): 229–234. Bibcode:2014Sci...346..229L. doi:10.1126/science.1250542. PMC 4545628. PMID 25301626. S2CID 9016105.
- Rice, James M.; Temple, Jeromey B.; McDonald, Peter F. (2017). "Private and public consumption across generations in Australia". Australasian Journal on Ageing. 36 (4): 279–285. doi:10.1111/ajag.12489. hdl:11343/253838. PMID 29205845. S2CID 21715593.
- Rice, James Mahmud; Temple, Jeromey B.; McDonald, Peter F. (2021). "Intergenerational inequality and the intergenerational state". Journal of Population Research. 38 (4): 367–399. doi:10.1007/s12546-021-09273-1. S2CID 239233692.
- Mason, Andrew; Lee, Ronald; members of the NTA Network (including James Rice) (2022). "Six ways population change will affect the global economy". Population and Development Review. 48 (1): 51–73. doi:10.1111/padr.12469. hdl:11573/1611036. S2CID 246835564.
- Rice, James Mahmud; Wilson, Tom; Temple, Jeromey B.; McDonald, Peter (2022). "The impact of demographic and economic change on the Australian generational economy: Financial sustainability, intergenerational inequality, and material living standards". Frontiers in Public Health. 10 798298. doi:10.3389/fpubh.2022.798298. PMC 9237328. PMID 35774565. S2CID 249628645.
