= Gøsta Esping-Andersen =

Danish sociologist (born 1947)

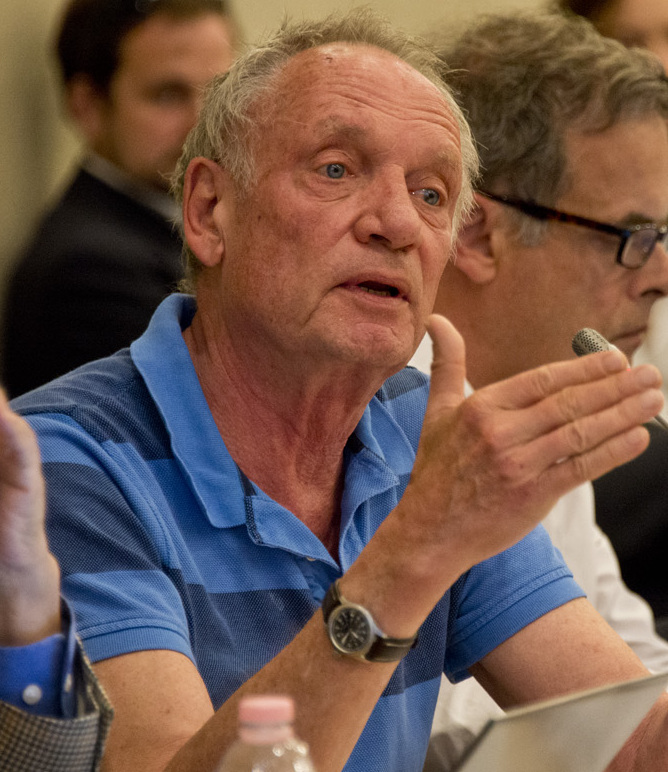
- Esping-Andersen in 2016
- Born: 24 November 1947 (age 78); Næstved, Denmark

Academic background
- Education: University of Copenhagen; University of Wisconsin–Madison
- Thesis: Social Class, Social Democracy and State Policy
- Doctoral advisor: Gerald Marwell
- Influences: Karl Polanyi; September Group

Academic work
- Discipline: Political science; sociology
- Sub-discipline: Policy studies
- Institutions: Harvard University; European University Institute; Pompeu Fabra University; Bocconi University
- Main interests: Comparative social policy; power resource theory
- Notable works: The Three Worlds of Welfare Capitalism (1990)
- Notable ideas: Welfare regimes
- Influenced: Robert E. Goodin

Gøsta Esping-Andersen (Note: Pronounced [ˈjøstæ ˈespe̝ŋ ˈɑnɐsn̩].) (born 24 November 1947) is a Danish sociologist whose primary focus has been on the welfare state and its place in capitalist economies. Jacob Hacker describes him as the "dean of welfare state scholars". Over the past decade his research has moved towards family demographic issues. A synthesis of his work was published as Families in the 21st Century (Stockholm, SNS, 2016).

Esping-Andersen is a pioneer of power resource theory.

== Academic career ==
Esping-Andersen completed his doctoral studies at the University of Wisconsin-Madison, writing a dissertation under the supervision of Gerald Marwell. While at Madison, Esping-Andersen also studied with Erik Olin Wright and Aage B. Sørensen, as well as Maurice Zeitlin, who mentored Esping-Andersen until his departure from the University of Wisconsin in 1977.

Esping-Andersen is professor emeritus at Pompeu Fabra University in Barcelona (Spain), and member of the Scientific Committee of the Juan March Institute and of the Board of Trustees and the Scientific Council at the IMDEA Social Sciences Institute, both in Madrid (Spain). He is a member of the American Academy of Social Sciences and the British Academy. He was awarded an honoris doctor causa from the University of Copenhagen in 2012. He is now a research professor at Bocconi University in Milan.

== Major works ==
Esping-Andersen (1990) challenges theories that argue capitalist welfare states tend to become increasingly uniform due to the assumed logic of industrialization. He identifies a connection between the degree of decommodification—the extent to which individuals can maintain their well-being without relying on the market—regarding pensions, healthcare, and unemployment benefits, as well as labor market policies, and the nature of the political regime in 18 member states of the Organization for Economic Co-operation and Development (OECD). He categorizes political regimes based on three key factors:

1. The extent of left-wing influence and working-class organization within the government,
2. The level of electoral support for Catholic conservatism,
3. The presence of an authoritarian past or historical restrictions on voting rights.

His most influential and highly cited book titled The Three Worlds of Welfare Capitalism was published in 1990 and laid out three main types of welfare states, in which modern developed capitalist nations cluster based on these criteria: (Note: These categories have little to do with the contemporary labels of American politics and have much more to do with general political theory.)

- Liberal welfare states are characterized by a lack of strong working-class mobilization and an absence of an absolutist political history. These systems primarily rely on means-tested benefits, offering limited social insurance while actively promoting private welfare provisions. Notable examples include the United States, Canada, and Australia.
- Conservative corporatist welfare states are influenced by a Catholic conservative tradition and have a history of political absolutism. They prioritize social insurance schemes over means-tested assistance or private benefits, yet they limit income redistribution. Countries such as Austria, Italy, France, and Germany exemplify this model.
- social democratic welfare states are distinguished by significant working-class participation in governance and the presence of influential social democratic parties. These states implement comprehensive welfare policies that emphasize income redistribution and incorporate labor market strategies to support unemployed individuals.

Other sociologists and political scientists went on to apply his theoretical analysis to the real world. One such example is a book entitled Real Worlds of Welfare Capitalism, written by Robert E. Goodin, Bruce Headey, Ruud Muffels, and Henk-Jan Dirven. While some critics claim Esping-Andersen's categories are becoming outdated, many political scientists are attracted by its intuitive simplicity.

In the past decade, his research has moved to demographic issues and in particular to the consequences of women's changing roles. He has developed a multiple equilibrium framework for the understanding of changing family behaviour. See in particular his Families in the 21st Century and Esping-Andersen and Billari (2015) and Retheorizing family demographic change. Population and Development Review (2015).

== Criticism ==
The evolving nature of welfare states often makes it difficult to categorize. Arguably, many welfare states have components from some or all typologies, making them more akin to points on a continuum rather than rigid typologies, a fact Esping-Andersen acknowledges in his writings.

According to the French sociologist Georges Menahem, Esping-Andersen's "decommodification index" aggregates both qualitative and quantitative variables for ”sets of dimensions” which are fluid, and pertain to three very different areas. Similarly, Menahem has concerns regarding the validity of the index, and its potential for replication.

In 1996, the Italian social scientist Maurizio Ferrera further developed Esping-Andersen's Worlds of Welfare by identifying a fourth subtype of the welfare state model, the Southern European Model of Welfare.

== Bibliography ==
=== Books ===
- Esping-Andersen, Gøsta (1980). Social class, social democracy and state policy: party policy and party decomposition in Denmark and Sweden. Copenhagen: Institute of Organization and Industrial Sociology. ISBN 9788770341790.
- Esping-Andersen, Gøsta; Zeitlin, Maurice; Friedland, Roger (1982). Political power and social theory: a research annual, volume 3. Greenwich, Connecticut: Jai Press Inc. ISBN 9780892322046.
- Esping-Andersen, Gøsta (1985). Politics against markets: the social democratic road to power. Princeton, New Jersey: Princeton University Press. ISBN 9780691028422.
- Esping-Andersen, Gøsta; Rein, Martin; Rainwater, Lee (1987). Stagnation and renewal in social policy: the rise and fall of policy regimes. Armonk, New York: M.E. Sharpe. ISBN 9780873323901.
- Esping-Andersen, Gøsta (1990). The three worlds of welfare capitalism. Princeton, New Jersey: Princeton University Press. ISBN 9780069028573.
- Esping-Andersen, Gøsta (1993). Changing classes stratification and mobility in post-industrial societies. London Newbury Park, California: Sage Publications. ISBN 9781849208253.
- Esping-Andersen, Gøsta (1996). Welfare states in transition national adaptations in global economies. London Thousand Oaks, California: Sage. ISBN 9780857021861.
- Esping-Andersen, Gøsta (1999). Social foundations of postindustrial economies. Oxford New York: Oxford University Press. ISBN 9780198742005.
- Esping-Andersen, Gøsta; Regini, Marino (2000). Why deregulate labour markets. Oxford UK New York: Oxford University Press. ISBN 9780199240524.
- Esping-Andersen, Gøsta; Gallie, Duncan; Hemerijck, Anton; Myles, John (2002). Why we need a new welfare state. New York: Oxford University Press. ISBN 9780199256433.
- Esping-Andersen, Gøsta (2007). Family formation and family dilemmas in contemporary Europe. Bilbao Spain: Fundación BBVA. ISBN 9788496515352.
- Esping-Andersen, Gøsta (2009). The incomplete revolution: adapting to women's new roles. Cambridge, UK Malden, Massachusetts: Polity. ISBN 9780745643168.
- Esping-Andersen, Gosta (2016) Families in the 21st Century (Stockholm, SNS).
