= Gender and Welfare State Regimes =

Organizing concept

Gender and Welfare State Regimes is an organizing concept that focuses a country's traditional social welfare policies in terms of how it influences employment and general social structure. Gender in terms of the welfare state regime varies based on how a nation perceives and acts on the value of gender. Within gender and welfare state regimes there are three central perspectives. The first perspective is the liberal welfare state, which is utilized in the United Kingdom and Ireland. This regime believes in minimal government intervention and promotes privatization of the economy in order to create equality. The second perspective is the conservative welfare state that is utilized in Germany, France, Austria, Belgium, the Netherlands, and Italy. This regime revolves around traditional family values and believes the economy should be structured around status differentiating programs that are earnings related. The third perspective is the Social Democratic welfare state that is utilized in the Scandinavian countries. This regime is characterized by universalism and believes in full employment, income protection and a strongly interventionist state.

The three welfare state regimes highlight employment opportunity, wage gaps, and health status as differentiating factors when it comes to gender. In terms of employment opportunity, it is impacted by the feminization of poverty. This is when woman represent a disproportionate share of the poor population compared to men. Varying beliefs between the three regimes on gender roles in the labor market effects the level of poverty pertaining toward sex. Wage gaps are affected by the differing beliefs on decommodification between the three welfare state regimes. The theory of decommodification looks to decommodify labor in order to substitute for wages, creating disparity between the pay of low-income earners (a category over-represented by women). Lastly, health status is seen to be influenced by the promotion of gender equality. Those regimes, which believe in equality for all, were seen to have better overall health, compared to those regimes that do not promote gender equality.

== Welfare State Regimes ==
The Three Worlds of Welfare Capitalism, written by sociologist Gosta Esping-Anderson, is the iconic work which developed the original opinions of different welfare state regimes among developed countries. Each has differing views on government intervention, citizen social capital, class equality, and other social factors. The three most commonly noted welfare state regimes are:

=== Liberal welfare state ===
The liberal welfare state is a governing regime that ensures that citizens are taken care of socially and economically. The liberal belief is to accomplish this with minimal government interference, allowing a free market economy to create equality. The liberal regime believes that the government monopolizes the market which only enhances class inequality and creates inefficiencies. Free markets, with little government interference, allows for competitive exchange which maintains equal opportunity for everyone to contribute to the economy and be successful. The government only provides the necessary support to alleviate poverty.

=== Conservative welfare state ===
The conservative welfare state, also known as the Christian welfare state, highlights a government regime with the least centralized system of governing. The conservative welfare state believes that decision-making should be directed by local levels rather than a centralized form of governing. The conservative regime is built on the foundation that there should be an authoritarian control which governs a hierarchy to control the market economy. This hierarchy creates different classes of people, which the conservative minded people believe creates stability. The conservative regime believes strong leadership and traditional gender and family roles are what allow a society to function smoothly.

=== Social democratic welfare state ===
The social democratic welfare state believes that by being a citizen of the nation, it grants access to universal services and state run benefits. The social democratic welfare state gives people more power in governance. The social democratic welfare state believes that improving social capital will mobilize power by making them less dependent on the market and employers. In order to positively create this, social democratic states believe that everyone requires social, health, and education resources to be efficient in society. By providing this to every citizen, it eliminates poverty, unemployment, and wage dependency, and in hand, creates a political unity with all citizens.

=== Social capital ===
Juha Kaariainen and Hekki Lehtonen comprised a study that focused on the relationship between social capital development and the welfare state. Two forms of social capital were looked at which were society-centered and institution-centered regimes. Society-centered social capital flourishes in societies with good family, community, and civic engagement values. Institution-centered social capital was thought to be formed through strong political support and public administration. All of the regimes seemed in favor of social capital. The conservative regime was more positive with the society-centered theory because they believe in bonding social capital through family and community ties. Voluntary civic engagement was seen to be most prevalent within liberal and social democratic state regimes.

Universal trust was stronger in northern Europe who are considered social democratic, followed by the liberal and conservative regimes. These liberal and social democratic regime characteristics are said to be related to bridging social capital. This means that these societies value equal opportunity and social inclusion. This study helps to show that social capital is seen in all regimes. With that being said, how people are handled and what society values differs. Social capital has its strengths and weaknesses in all regimes.

== Employment opportunity ==
One of the central topics which relates to gender and welfare state countries is the access which every individual has to good employment. In saying good employment, it is implied that a person has equal opportunity for quality part-time or full-time employment, with the same chance of advancing to desired positions. Each regime (liberal, conservative, and social democratic) has different views on the amount of social capital a person should possess. The liberal welfare state believes in laissez-faire attitude towards the market economy. As contemporary economist Adam Smith believed, the liberal welfare state ideologies would eliminate inequalities and privileges in regards to employment by having minimal government interference. The conservative welfare state views on job opportunity wanted government interference in order to create hierarchal powers and class differentiation. To conservatives, it was natural to have people with lower employment status than the select people who were developed to be leaders. This ideology to the conservatives improved efficiency.

Lastly, social democratic welfare states go out of their way to make all citizens employed. The belief of having everyone employed is that equality would mobilize power and diminish the social issues which trouble a lot of governmental systems.

In order to analyze how gender is impacted under these three regimes, a study conducted by Bartoll, Cortes, and Artazcoz was done to discover how working conditions, job satisfaction, health status, and psychological issues were impacted by different genders in part-time and full-time employment. The study used Esping-Anderson's welfare states to divide the data from different countries into the different regimes. The results yielded that there were generally more women who had part-time employment than males, and more males with full-time employment than females across most regimes. ‘The lowest prevalence of females with part time employment was in conservative welfare state regimes, while the highest was with liberal welfare state regimes’. This makes sense due to the fact that women have little employment protection from the government in the liberal regime. In general, part-time employment was seen to be associated with poorer working conditions than people with full-time employment. Among the three welfare state regimes, the conservative welfare state countries did seem to be an outlier from the results.

What was found in these associated countries was that there was a higher psychological demand for men, there were lower salaries and chance for promotion for both men and women (liberal and social democratic states had lower salaries and lower chance for promotion for women than men), women were more likely to have permanent contracts, men were more likely to be dissatisfied with their job, and the only differences with job satisfaction with the regimes were noticed with the conservative welfare state (men more satisfied than women).

What this study shows was that women tend to make up a majority of the low-income employment across all the regimes. Although working conditions, job satisfaction, health status, and psychological issues vary with genders in each regime, the general trend is that females face a disadvantage when finding good employment.

This phenomenon of having a disproportionate number of females in the lower-income bracket of the job market is called the feminization of poverty. The rates of females in poverty has become higher due to the fact that they are disadvantaged when it comes to good employment compared to men. Women also struggle with economic difficulties resulting from the high rates of abandonment, divorce, and widowhood which has been increasing in recent decades.

== Wage gaps ==
As was highlighted by Hadas Mandel and Michael Shalev in their theoretical analysis looking at how the welfare states shape the gender pay gap, the theories of decommodfication and defamilialization underline the key differences. "Decommodification believes in decommodifying labour in order to substitute a workers wage with direct means of income transfers, or indirectly through free or subsidized goods and services (social insurance, cash benefits, public housing, free public services). Defamilialization is the state taking action for care work in order to allow more females to be able to join the work force as opposed to tending to the family all day."

Both of these theories combine to allow the labour force to grow with a larger female population. The liberal welfare state regime and the social democratic welfare state regime both support these theories. The liberal welfare state looks to encourage the activity of people in a free market economy and to be able to support themselves with private social and family services. The liberal regime calls for women to join the work force in order to pay for these services and contribute to the economy. The social democratic welfare state believes in universalism, which means that government provides public services, and thus allows more women to join the work force. In opposition to both of these regimes, the conservative welfare state mostly rejects decommodification and defamilialization. Conservative beliefs prefer a status differentiating society and value the traditional family roles to maintain that. Thus, women are expected to tend to the family, while men remain the primary breadwinners.

To help display the differences that these theories have on the gender pay gap, Hadas Mandel continued his research to discover how welfare state policies effect socio-economic positions. He did so using the Luxembourg Income Study from 21 advanced countries, looking at the gender pay gap with low and high income earners. When it comes to low income earners, the study found that there was not a significant wage gap between men and women in the liberal and social democratic regimes. Where there was a significant wage gap was in social democratic regimes and high income wage earners. The study found that this category of earners had a considerably larger gap than the liberal and conservative regimes for high income earners. Also, as was hypothesized in the study, the conservative welfare state had higher gender wage gaps than the other welfare states with low income earners and still had a recognizable gap with high income earners. The conclusion of the study was that the gender wage gap was determined by the advantage or disadvantage mothers faced with the welfare states interference.

A similar study done by Solomon Polachek and Jun Xiang, used the same Luxembourg Income Study, but looked at different factors that influence the gender income wage gaps. This study concluded that fertility rate, age gap between spouses in their first marriage, and the top marginal income tax rate are all factors which correlate with the results. This states that there are external social factors which influence the pay gap between men and women, as well as the institutional factors which were noted previously.

== Health status ==
Perceived health status is impacted in a couple of ways in regards the welfare state regimes. These factors include benefits received through differing ideologies and socio-economic disadvantages which groups of people face. When focusing on benefits which people receive, liberal welfare states have minimal access to benefits because of the minimal government influence. As well, privatized care requires means testing and strict criteria in order to be considered for care. The conservative welfare state has benefits which are earnings related and depend on what the employer decides to offer their employees. Conservative regimes also believe in family ties which impact the amount of personal care a person receives. The liberal and conservative welfare state regimes provide benefits depending on an individual's engagement in the workforce. As has been noted, women tend to face a disadvantage in employment opportunity and wages.

This makes it difficult to receive good health benefits in liberal and conservative regimes. The social democratic welfare state believes in universal public care services in return for full employment by society. The social democratic regime believes in creating equality for all with access to good health and health care. This regime is able to do this because it has a fully contributive market economy which agrees to decommidifying their labour for this care.

A study conducted by Eikemo et al. depicts how welfare state regimes impact health issues caused by socio-economic disadvantages. The authors do so through the European Social Survey, which focused on 21 different countries. The main findings were that liberal and social democratic regimes had a higher perceived health rating than the conservative regime. The study relates these findings to the decommodification theory. Liberal and social democratic regimes substitute worker wages and receive care service to compensate for that loss. These services are seen to correlate with better health. On the other hand, the conservative view rejects decommodifiction, causing the access for necessary care to be lower. Socio-economic explanations for gender health also point to women being more vulnerable to health problems. Women disproportionally represent the poorer populations across the welfare state regimes. Women who are economically deprived are more vulnerable to infectious disease, arthritis, migraines, stress, mental illness (depression), and increased risk to heart disease.

== Limitations ==
Even though countries are placed into these three welfare state regimes, many are very close in ideologies with one another. The nations which are identified under each welfare state regime can be classified as ‘prototypes’. This means that each welfare state regime identified should not be taken as an ideal type. This notion derives from Esping Andersen's decommodification and social stratification index. The index highlights that each country varies in the strength of how strictly they follow the welfare state it is categorized under. Due to the fact that many of the social issues which a country faces is intersectional, they may take on another welfare states ideology to target a certain issue.

For example, Esping-Anderson notes that, “European conservative regimes have incorporated both liberal and social democratic impulses. Over the decades, they have become less corporatist and less authoritarian.” A lot of the scrutiny which Esping-Anderson's research concluded was due to the legitimacy of what each welfare state represented. It is important to realize this when looking at gender issues in the welfare state regimes.
