= Power resources approach =

Framework in sociology

Power Resources Approach is a framework originating from Power resource theory that examines how organized labor can build power through collective mobilization to advance their interest in a structurally asymmetric and antagonistic relationship between capital and labor.

It exists as a research framework to identify different sources of worker power.
