= Critical mass (sociodynamics) =

Self-sustaining action that creates growth

In social dynamics, critical mass is a sufficient number of adopters of a new idea, technology or innovation in a social system so that the rate of adoption becomes self-sustaining and creates further growth. The point at which critical mass is achieved is sometimes referred to as a threshold within the threshold model of statistical modeling.

The term "critical mass" is borrowed from nuclear physics, where it refers to the amount of a substance needed to sustain a chain reaction. Within social sciences, critical mass has its roots in sociology and is often used to explain the conditions under which reciprocal behavior is started within collective groups, and how reciprocal behavior becomes self-sustaining. Recent technology research in platform ecosystems shows that apart from the quantitative notion of a “sufficient number”, critical mass is also influenced by qualitative properties such as reputation, interests, commitments, capabilities, goals, consensuses, and decisions, all of which are crucial in determining whether reciprocal behavior can be started to achieve sustainability to a commitment such as an idea, new technology, or innovation.

Other social factors that are important include the size of; and inter-dependencies and level of communication in a society or one of its subcultures. Another is social stigma, or the possibility of public advocacy due to such a factor. Critical mass is a concept used in a variety of contexts, including physics, group dynamics, politics, public opinion, and technology.

== History ==
The concept of critical mass was originally created by game theorist Thomas Schelling and sociologist Mark Granovetter to explain the actions and behaviors of a wide range of people and phenomenon. The concept was first established (although not explicitly named) in Schelling's essay about racial segregation in neighborhoods, "Dynamic models of segregation", published in 1971 in the Journal of Mathematical Sociology, and later refined in his book, Micromotives and Macrobehavior, published in 1978. Schelling did use the term "critical density" with regard to pollution in his "On the Ecology of Micromotives". Granovetter, in his essay "Threshold models of collective behavior", published in the American Journal of Sociology in 1978 worked to solidify the theory.

=== Predecessors ===
The concept of critical mass has been a present, if not solidified, idea in the study of consumer habits and economics, especially in General Equilibrium Theory. In his papers, Schelling quotes the well-known "The Market for Lemons: Quality Uncertainty and the Market Mechanism" paper written in 1970 by George Akerlof.

Finally, Herbert A. Simon's essay, "Bandwagon and underdog effects and the possibility of election predictions", published in 1954 in Public Opinion Quarterly, has been cited as a predecessor to the concept we now know as critical mass.

== Logic of collective action and common good ==
Critical mass and the theories behind it help us to understand aspects of humans as they act and interact in a larger social setting. Certain theories, such as Mancur Olson's Logic of Collective Action or Garrett Hardin's Tragedy of the Commons, work to help us understand why humans do or adopt certain things which are beneficial to them, or, more importantly, why they do not.

Oliver, Marwell, and Teixeira tackle this subject in relation to critical theory in a 1985 article published in the American Journal of Sociology. In their essay, they define that action in service of a public good as "collective action".

== Gender politics ==
Critical mass theory in gender politics and collective political action is defined as the critical number of personnel needed to affect policy and make a change not as the token but as an influential body. This number has been placed at 30%, before women are able to make a substantial difference in politics. However, other research suggests lower numbers of women working together in legislature can also affect political change. Kathleen Bratton goes so far as to say that women, in legislatures where they make up less than 15% of the membership, may actually be encouraged to develop legislative agendas that are distinct from those of their male colleagues. Others argue that we should look more closely at parliamentary and electoral systems instead of critical mass.

== Interactive media ==
While critical mass can be applied to many different aspects of sociodynamics, it becomes increasingly applicable to innovations in interactive media such as the telephone, fax, or email. With other non-interactive innovations, the dependence on other users was generally sequential, meaning that the early adopters influenced the later adopters to use the innovation. However, with interactive media, the interdependence was reciprocal, meaning both users influenced each other. This is due to the fact that interactive media have high network effect, wherein the value and utility of a good or service increases the more users it has. Thus, the increase of adopters and quickness to reach critical mass can therefore be faster and more intense with interactive media, as can the rate at which previous users discontinue their use. The more people that use it, the more beneficial it will be, thus creating a type of snowball effect, and conversely, if users begin to stop using the innovation, the innovation loses utility, thus pushing more users to discontinue their use.

=== Markus essay ===
In M. Lynne Markus' essay in Communication Research entitled "Toward a 'Critical Mass' Theory of Interactive Media", several propositions are made that attempt to predict under what circumstances interactive media is most likely to achieve critical mass and reach universal access—a "common good", using Oliver et al.'s terminology. One proposition states that such media's existence is all or nothing, wherein if universal access is not achieved, then, eventually, use will discontinue. Another proposition suggests that a media's ease of use and inexpensiveness, as well as its utilization of an "active notification capability" will help it achieve universal access. The third proposition states that the heterogeneity, as discussed by Oliver et al., is beneficial, especially if users are dispersed over a larger area, thus necessitating interactivity via media. Fourth, it is very helpful to have highly sought-after individuals to act as early adopters, as their use acts as incentive for later users. Finally, Markus posits that interventions, both monetarily and otherwise, by governments, businesses, or groups of individuals will help a media reach its critical mass and achieve universal access.

=== Fax machine example ===
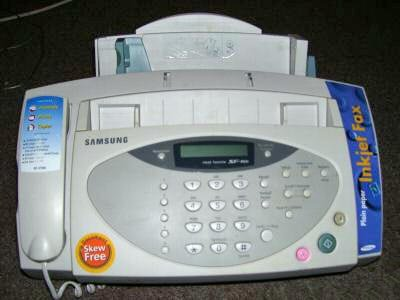
A fax machine

An example put forth by Rogers in Diffusion of Innovations was that of the fax machine, which had been around for almost 150 years before it became popular and widely used. It had existed in various forms and for various uses, but with more advancements in the technology of faxes, including the use of existing phone lines to transmit information, coupled with falling prices in both machines and cost per fax, the fax machine reached a critical mass in 1987, when "Americans began to assume that 'everybody else' had a fax machine".

=== Social media example ===
Critical mass is fundamental for social media sites to maintain a significant userbase. Reaching a sustainable population is dependent on the collective rather than individual use of the technology. The adoption of the platform creates the effects of positive externalities whereby each additional user provides additional perceived benefits to previous and potential adopters.

Facebook provides a good illustration of critical mass. In its initial stages, Facebook had limited value to users due to the lack of network effects and critical mass. The principle behind the strategy is that at each time Facebook enlarged the size of the community, the saturation never drops below the critical mass, reaching the desired diffusion effect discussed in Rogers' Diffusion of innovations. Facebook promoted the innovation to groups that were likely to adopt en masse. Between 2003–2004 Facebook was exclusive to universities such as Harvard, Yale and 34 other schools. Perceived critical mass grew amongst the student population, and by the end of 2004 more than a million students had signed up, continuing to when Facebook opened the platform to high-school and university students worldwide in 2005, before eventually launching to the public in 2006.

== Psychological Aspects ==
Within social and organizational psychology, the effects of critical mass are influenced by processes related to social identity and group dynamics. Research by Ely indicates that in environments with low levels of representation, those from underrepresented groups may experience an increase in visibility and stereotyping, whereas in cases of higher representation there is an association to reduced stereotyping and greater access to professional support networks. Empirical studies by Dasgupta further show that the presence of ingroup members can diminish the effects of negative stereotypes by reducing identity threat and supporting performance outcomes.

== See also ==
- Bandwagon effect
  - Economics of networks
- Network effect
- One-third hypothesis
- Positive feedback
- Tipping point (sociology)
- Viral phenomenon
- Metcalfe's law
