= Pamela Oliver =

Pamela Oliver may refer to:

- Pamela E. Oliver, an American sociologist
- Pam Oliver, an American sports journalist
- Pamela Stuart Oliver, a fictional character
