= The Journal of Political Philosophy =

- Discipline: Philosophy
- Language: English
- Edited by: Robert E. Goodin

Publication details
- History: 1993–2025
- Publisher: Wiley-Blackwell
- Frequency: Quarterly
- Impact factor: 2.362 (2017)

Standard abbreviations
- ISO 4: J. Political Philos.

Indexing
- ISSN: 0963-8016 (print); 1467-9760 (web)
- LCCN: 93650700
- OCLC no.: 37447096

Links
- Journal homepage; Online access; Online archive

The Journal of Political Philosophy was a quarterly peer-reviewed academic journal covering all aspects of political philosophy between 1993 and 2025.

== Controversy ==
The journal became engaged in a controversy when it published three articles on Black Lives Matter, each written by white academics and previously presented at a conference on that subject. The controversy began when Yale professor Christopher Lebron published an "open letter" criticizing the journal for not having included "philosophers of color" in the symposium. Lebron further claimed that the journal had not, up to that point, published on race since the beginning of the Black Lives Matter movement began, and that it had not published a philosopher of color since the journal's inception. The conference organizers pointed out that they had invited philosophers of color to contribute to the symposium but that none had chosen to. Others noted that the Journal of Political Philosophy had published on race since the beginning of Black Lives Matter movement, and that they had published philosophers of color - indeed, the journal was co-founded by Chandran Kukathas, a philosopher of color. The editors issued a formal apology, promised to add at least two African American academics to the editorial board, and committed to seeking more works written by non-white academics.

== Editorial Resignation ==
In April 2023, publisher Wiley-Blackwell fired Robert Goodin as editor of the journal, citing problems of "communication". In response, the associate editors Sally Haslanger, Philip Pettit, Anne Phillips, and Amia Srinivasan, and editorial board members Kwame Anthony Appiah, Jane Mansbridge, Jeff McMahan, and Anna Stilz resigned from their positions at the journal in protest to Goodin's removal as editor. The former editors of the Journal of Political Philosophy announced the formation of a new journal, Political Philosophy, in its stead.

== Abstracting and indexing ==
The journal is abstracted and indexed in:

- CSA Worldwide Political Science Abstracts
- EBSCOhost
- International Bibliography of the Social Sciences
- Scopus
- Sociological Abstracts

According to the Journal Citation Reports, the journal has a 2015 impact factor of 1.044, ranking it 63rd out of 163 journals in the category "Political Science" and 24th out of 51 journals in the category "Ethics".

== See also ==
- List of ethics journals
- List of political science journals
