= Power resource theory =

Political theory of welfare states

Power resource theory is a political theory proposing that variations among welfare states is largely attributable to differing distributions of power between economic classes. It argues that "working class power achieved through organisation by labor unions or left parties, produces more egalitarian distributional outcomes".

Pioneered in the 1970s and 1980s by a school of Scandinavian researchers closely associated with Walter Korpi, Gøsta Esping-Andersen, and John Stephens, power resource theory is an empirical approach to examining the development, characteristics and effects of social policies in advanced industrialized nations. It attempts to account for the various approaches to social policy adopted by different nations, focusing primarily on the role and strength of labor mobilization. Its major conclusion is that social welfare provisions are larger and income inequality lower in countries where working-class people are more politically organized.

While power resource theory became the dominant paradigm among scholars in the 1990s for explaining variations between welfare states in advanced democracies, there are criticisms that point out the lack of accountability for factors such as variations in "coverage, extension, and generosity among welfare states" in addition to not accounting for the importance of political mobilization based on social class. Competing theories have also challenged power resource theory with alternative explanations for the varying levels of welfare development such as the importance of employers and cross-class alliances that exist in coordinated market societies.
