= Gerald Marwell =

American academic (1937–2013)

- Born: February 12, 1937; Brooklyn, New York
- Died: March 24, 2013 (aged 76); New York City
- Scientific career
- Fields: Sociology
- Workplaces: New York University

Gerald Marwell (February 12, 1937 – March 24, 2013) was an American sociologist, social psychologist and behavioral economist. He was most recently Professor of Sociology at New York University. He is best known for his innovative work on problems of collective action, cooperation, social movements, compliance-gaining behavior, adolescence and religion.

== Biography ==
Marwell was born in Brooklyn, N.Y. in 1937, and died in New York City on March 24, 2013. He earned a BS from Massachusetts Institute of Technology in Business Administration and Mechanical Engineering in 1953. His MA (1959) and Ph.D. (1964) in Sociology were from New York University. From 1962 through 2001 Marwell was Professor of Sociology at the University of Wisconsin – Madison, where he was named the Richard T. Ely Chair in 1991, and served as department chair from 1982 to 1985. After retiring from Wisconsin he moved to NYU in 2003. From 1989 to 1993 he served as editor of the American Sociological Review, the official journal of the American Sociological Association.

== Scholarship ==
With different co-authors Marwell has published five books, including an Introductory text in Sociology (with N. J. Demerath, III). He has also authored or co-authored more than 60 articles and chapters, most in major journals in Sociology, Psychology, Economics and Political Science.

Marwell's most sustained research and theoretical interest has been in problems of collective action and cooperation in groups. His earliest work in this area used experimental games such as the Prisoner's Dilemma to explore various conditions for achieving cooperation between and among subjects when previous works predicted non-cooperation. Eventually, he and David R. Schmitt developed their own experimental paradigm for larger groups in which they demonstrated, among other things, that levels of perceived risk was a major factor in determining cooperative behavior (See Cooperation, 1975).

Between 1979 and 1981 Marwell (with his students) published four major articles titled “Experiments on the Provision of Public Goods by Groups, I – IV” in which he developed the “Cooperation Game,” variations of which would become standard in Economics for experimental work on free riding. Among other things, these experiments showed that because of what they saw as “fairness” people were almost 50% less likely to free ride than standard economic theory predicted. Furthermore, the ability to communicate and make bargains within real groups allowed cooperation to develop where theory had predicted total free riding. Economics graduate students were the only subjects who behaved the way that economic theory predicted.

Marwell next turned to reformulating economic collective action theory, using mathematical analysis and computer simulations. With Pamela Oliver he published six articles between 1985 and 1991, which were ultimately integrated into their book The Critical Mass in Collective Action(1993). The effects of different payoff regimes and of communication between potential collaborators (signaling) were central findings of the research. Having some contributors who were highly interested in the cooperative payoffs, and also able to dedicate high amounts of resources to the action, often provided a “critical mass” that would overcome tendencies towards free riding, start the collective action and then draw in additional participants.

Marwell's theoretical work on collective action was informed by his previous research on white students who participated in the Civil Rights Movement. With N.J. Demerath, III and Michael T. Aiken, Marwell conducted surveys of volunteers for the 1965 SCLC voter registration and organization drives in the South both before and after their summer experiences. This work led to Dynamics of Idealism: White Students in a Black Movement (1971), and reported on the centrality of social relationships for recruiting participants and the difficult situations which the students had to confront during the summer. Subsequent research studied the life course of the volunteers as compared with their peers.

One other line of work owes its origins to the work of Marwell and David R. Schmitt. Their two original articles on “compliance-gaining behavior” became the basis for an extended program of research by others working mostly in the field of communications.

Marwell's recent work on religion began with his interest in free riding. When Rodney Stark and his colleagues claimed that at least an important part of the strength of evangelical religion could be attributed to conversions of individuals seeking to leave the less collectively enthusiastic mainline Protestant churches, Marwell argued that the evidence was poor and that the use of free riding was theoretically weak.

== See also ==
- Cooperation
- Economics of religion
