= Social Indicators Research =

- Discipline: Quality of Life Research, sociology
- Language: English
- Edited by: David Bartram

Publication details
- History: 1974-present
- Publisher: Springer Science+Business Media
- Frequency: 15/year
- Impact factor: 3.2 (2025)

Standard abbreviations
- ISO 4: Soc. Indic. Res.

Indexing
- ISSN: 0303-8300 (print); 1573-0921 (web)

Links
- Journal homepage

Social Indicators Research, established in 1974, is an academic journal that publishes research results dealing with the measurement of the quality of life.

== Editors ==
As of May 2025, the editor-in-chief is David Bartram (University of Leicester).

== Abstracting and indexing ==
The journal is abstracted and indexed in the Social Sciences Citation Index. According to the Journal Citation Reports, the journal has a 2025 impact factor of 3.2.
