= The Three Worlds of Welfare Capitalism =

Book by Gøsta Esping-Andersen (1990)

- Author: Gøsta Esping-Andersen
- Language: English
- Publisher: Princeton University Press
- Publication date: 1990
- Publication place: US
- Pages: 248
- ISBN: 9780069028573

The Three Worlds of Welfare Capitalism is a book on political theory written by Danish sociologist Gøsta Esping-Andersen, published in 1990. The work is Esping-Andersen's most influential and highly cited work, outlining three main types of welfare states, in which modern developed capitalist nations cluster. The work occupies seminal status in the comparative analysis of the welfare states of Western Europe and other advanced capitalist economies.

It has been described as the most influential welfare state research of the contemporary period. The work called into question well-established ways of thinking about differences among welfare states in advanced capitalist democracies. At the time of writing this book, Gøsta Esping-Andersen was Professor at the European University Institute, Florence.

== Typology of welfare capitalism ==
In The Three Worlds of Welfare Capitalism, Esping-Andersen outlines a typology of welfare capitalism in an attempt to classify contemporary Western welfare states as belonging to one of three "worlds of welfare capitalism." The three types are characterised by a specific labour market regime and also by a specific post‐industrial employment trajectory.

The three types are:

- Liberal regimes, characterized by modest, means-tested assistance, and targeted at low-income, usually working-class recipients. Their strict entitlement rules are often associated with stigma. This type of welfare state encourages market solutions to social problems — either passively, by guaranteeing only a minimum, or actively, by directly subsidizing private welfare schemes.
- Conservative regimes, which are typically shaped by traditional family values, and tend to encourage family-based assistance dynamics. Social insurance in this model typically excludes non-working wives, and family benefits encourage motherhood. State assistance will typically only step in when the family's capacity to aid its members is exhausted.
- Social democratic regimes, universalistic systems that promote an equality of high standards, rather than an equality of minimal needs. This implies decommodifying welfare services, to reduce the division introduced by market-based access to welfare services, as well as preemptively socializing the costs of caring for children, the aged, and the helpless, instead of then waiting until the family's capacity to support them is depleted. This results in a commitment to a heavy social service burden, which introduces an imperative to minimize social problems, thereby aligning the system's goals with the welfare and emancipation (typically via full employment policies) of those it supports.

Since its publication the typology has been widely used in academic research and theory, and has generated much debate on the subject of the nature of the welfare state. The desirability of the work's approach has been stated by various comparative welfare state scholars.

In the book Esping-Andersen criticized earlier theoretical models of the welfare state as "inadequate", arguing that their analysis relied too heavily upon the misleading comparison of aggregate welfare state expenditure, and also argued that public expenditure should no longer be a measure of comparison and that we should seek to replace it with other measures. In the place of expenditure, Esping-Andersen built his typology on a rich database of detailed programme characteristics.

=== East Asia ===
While using three categories in his typology, the author notes that East Asia may not strictly fit in a single category but may be seen as a hybrid of liberal and conservative models. In applying the Esping-Anderson's typology to Japan, Gregory J. Kasza posits that several factors are ignored by the model and similar typologies. According to Kasza, a state's social policy regime should not be approached as a coherent whole, but rather as a product of various fragmented and even contradictory policies which are the result of the interaction between political actors and policymaking processes. The statistical and quantitative character of typologies – like Esping-Anderson's – is argued to decontextualize the development of welfare regimes by neglecting the role of historical factors, diverse political actors, and policymaking processes, thus leading to false assumptions about welfare regimes.

=== Southern Europe ===
Other scholars, including Maurizio Ferrera, have argued that the model does not apply entirely to Southern European countries such as Italy, Spain, Portugal and Greece. These models are, on the one hand, conservative since they rely on family ties. But, on the other hand, they also have high levels of governmental pensions which, in the extended family network, are often used to support also the young members when unemployed.
