= Quality of Life Research =

- Discipline: Public health, medicine
- Language: English
- Edited by: Jan Böhnke, Claudia Rutherford

Publication details
- History: 1992-present
- Publisher: Springer Science+Business Media
- Frequency: 10/year
- Impact factor: 4.147 (2020)

Standard abbreviations
- ISO 4: Qual. Life Res.

Indexing
- CODEN: QLREEG
- ISSN: 0962-9343 (print); 1573-2649 (web)
- OCLC no.: 863228078

Links
- Journal homepage; Online archive

Quality of Life Research is a peer-reviewed academic journal covering research into quality of life from a medical and public health perspective. It was established in 1992 and is published ten times per year by Springer Science+Business Media. It is the official journal of the International Society of Quality of Life Research. The editors-in-chief are Jan Böhnke (University of Dundee) and Claudia Rutherford (University of Sydney). According to the Journal Citation Reports, the journal has a 2017 impact factor of 2.392.
