= Robert E. Goodin =

American academic

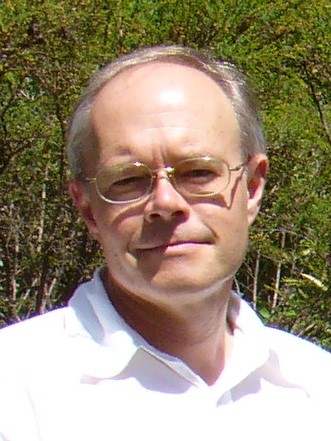
- Goodin in 2006
- Born: Robert Edward Goodin; 30 November 1950 (age 75)
- Awards: Stein Rokkan Prize (2009); Johan Skytte Prize (2022)

Academic background
- Education: Indiana University, Bloomington (BA); University of Oxford (PhD)
- Influences: Charles Tilly, Brian Barry

Academic work
- Discipline: Political science
- Sub-discipline: Political theory
- Institutions: Australian National University; University of Essex

Robert E. Goodin (born 30 November 1950) is an American philosopher who is a former Professor of Government at the University of Essex and is now Distinguished Professor of Philosophy and Social and Political Theory at the Australian National University.

== Biography ==
Goodin attended Oxford University, where he earned a DPhil in politics in 1975.

He is a Fellow of the Academy of the Social Sciences in Australia and a Corresponding Fellow of the British Academy. In 2009 he won the Stein Rokkan Prize for Comparative Social Science Research, awarded by the International Social Science Council.

He is the founding editor of The Journal of Political Philosophy and a co-editor of the British Journal of Political Science.

In 2022, Goodin was awarded the prestigious Johan Skytte Prize in Political Science for his "acuity and success endeavored to blend political philosophy with empirical political science to increase the understanding of how decent and dignified societies can be shaped.”

== Selected bibliography ==
=== Books ===
- Goodin, Robert E. (1980). Manipulatory politics. New Haven: Yale University Press. ISBN 9780300024630.
- Goodin, Robert E. (1985). Protecting the vulnerable. Chicago, Illinois: University of Chicago Press. ISBN 9780226302997.
- Goodin, Robert E. (1988). Reasons for welfare: the political theory of the welfare state. Princeton, New Jersey: Princeton University Press. ISBN 9780691022796.
- Goodin, Robert E. (1989). No smoking: the ethical issues. Chicago: University of Chicago Press. ISBN 9780226303017.
- Goodin, Robert E. (1992). Green political theory. Cambridge, UK Cambridge, Massachusetts, USA: Polity Press. ISBN 9780745610276.
- Barry, Brian; Goodin, Robert E. (1992). Free movement: ethical issues in the transnational migration of people and of money. University Park, Pennsylvania: Pennsylvania State University Press. ISBN 9780271008875.
- Goodin, Robert E. (1995). Utilitarianism as a public philosophy. Cambridge New York: Cambridge University Press. ISBN 9780521468060.
- Goodin, Robert E.; Pettit, Philip (1998). A companion to contemporary political philosophy. Oxford, UK Cambridge, Massachusetts: Blackwell. ISBN 9780631227540.
- Goodin, Robert E.; Headey, Bruce; Muffels, Rudd; Dirven, Henk-Jan (1999). The real worlds of welfare capitalism. Cambridge, U.K. New York: Cambridge University Press. ISBN 9780521596398.
- Goodin, Robert E. (2005). Reflective democracy. Oxford: Oxford University Press. ISBN 9780199279746.
- Goodin, Robert E.; Tilly, Charles (2006). The Oxford handbook of contextual political analysis. Oxford New York: Oxford University Press. ISBN 9780199270439.
- Brennan, Geoffrey; Goodin, Robert; Jackson, Frank; Smith, Michael (2007). Common minds: themes from the philosophy of Philip Pettit. Oxford, UK: Clarendon Press. ISBN 9780199218165.
- Goodin, Robert E.; Rice, James Mahmud; Parpo, Antti; Eriksson, Lina (2008). Discretionary time: a new measure of freedom. Cambridge, U.K.: Cambridge University Press. ISBN 9780521709514.
- Goodin, Robert E. (2008). Innovating democracy : democratic theory and practice after the deliberative turn. New York: Oxford University Press. ISBN 978-0-19-954794-4.
- Goodin, Robert E. (2009). The Oxford handbook of political science. Oxford New York: Oxford University Press. ISBN 9780199562954.
- Goodin, Robert E. (2012). On settling. Princeton, New Jersey: Princeton University Press. ISBN 9780691148458.
- Lepora, Chiara; Goodin, Robert E. (2013). On complicity and compromise. Oxford United Kingdom: Oxford University Press. ISBN 9780199677900.

=== Journal articles ===
- Goodin, Robert E.; Rein, Martin (Winter 2001). "Regimes on pillars: alternative welfare state logics and dynamics". Public Administration. 79 (4): 769–801. doi:10.1111/1467-9299.00280.
- Goodin, Robert E. (July 2003). "Choose your capitalism? (review)". Comparative European Politics. 1 (2): 203–213. doi:10.1057/palgrave.cep.6110009. S2CID 144666758.
- Goodin, Robert E.; Tanașoca, Ana (October 2014). "Double voting". Australasian Journal of Philosophy. 92 (4): 743–758. doi:10.1080/00048402.2014.913300. S2CID 218621169.
