= Georges Menahem =

French sociologist and economist

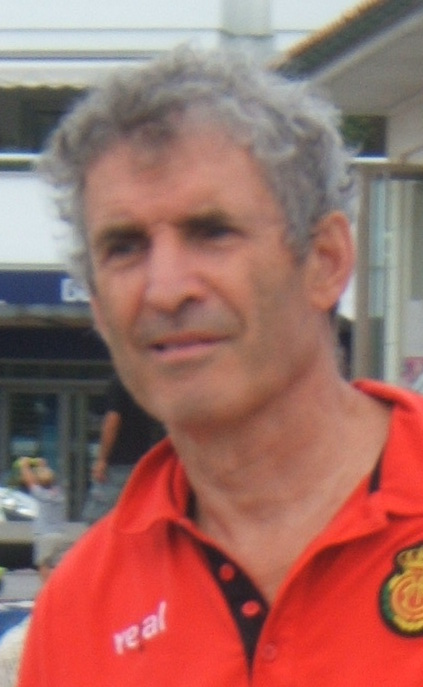
Portrait of Georges Menahem

Georges Menahem is a French sociologist and economist whose work employs methods drawn from economics, sociology and statistics. He is a Research Director in the French National Centre for Scientific Research (CNRS). Previously, he had been a senior research fellow in the Institute for Research and Information in Health Economics (IRDES), a French research institute specializing in health economics and health statistics.

== Scientific biography ==
Georges Menahem began his university training at Grenoble University (France) where he graduated in mathematics and physics. After having performed his first experiments in the field of astrophysics (in Jodrell Bank Observatory and Nançay Decimetric Radio Telescope) and solid-state physics (in Grenoble University), his observations in social sciences led him to write his first book (1976) on the relationships between science and the military. In a subsequent shift in intellectual pursuits toward the social sciences, his research focused on the sociology of the labour knowledge and of the division of labour, on the sociology of the family, with the creation of a new typology of family organisation and an analysis of The Economic Rationales Within the Family, a topic which became the title of his PhD in Economics.

In the 1990s, as a sociologist searching for root causes of family behaviours, he discovered significant correlation between risky behaviours, vulnerability to illness and grave childhood traumatic events, findings that he explored in greater depth, first with data from INSEE, then with IRDES data. As an economist, he tried also to explain these findings with concepts from health economics and risk economics. Since 2003 he has focused on measuring social well-being by building economic security indices.

== Activities ==
Since 1999, Menahem has been a member of the Scientific Advisory Council of ATTAC. Recently he published an analysis of the European process of militarization through its relationships with European foreign policy. In August 2008 and in August 2011, Menahem directed workshops on the European militarization: first, in the Attac European Summer University of Saarbrücken. and second in the Attac European Network Academy in Fribourg.

Since 2008, Menahem has also participated in the "Forum for Alternative Indicators of Riches" (FAIR more known according its French acronym) which was founded in order to monitor the activities of the "Commission on the Measurement of Economic Performance and Social Progress" chaired by Joseph Stiglitz. Following this path, he has contributed to elaborate the critical analysis of the final report of this commission. In 2011, he published on the web-site of the UNCSD "Rio + 20 Conférence" a paper arguing to enlarge well-being indicators that the United Nations secretary-general will have to implement after the Rio+20 Conference. In June 2012, he participated in the Rio+20 Summit, holding a side-event and two self-organized activities in the World People Summit with two other members of FAIR, the Belgium professor Isabelle Cassiers and the French-Indian accountant Muttiah Yogananthan. Their critics were mainly devoted to criticize on environmental grounds the monetization of the sustainability approach by the World Bank and the United Nations Environment Programme (Unep). According to Georges Menahem, "the Inclusive Wealth Index (IWI), a measure introduced by the UNEP and the UN University, would make the world's environmental situation worse: if it is adopted and widely used, it could be very dangerous. It underestimates the depletion of natural resources and overestimates the monetized outcome of GDP, such as GDP and human capital".

Since the climate conference in Copenhagen in 2009, following the Evo Morales speech proposing the creation of a Global Climate Tribunal, Georges Menahem has been working on the establishment of a court that would expand the environmental expertise of the International Criminal Court. To develop the legal means of defending the environment, he has joined in May 2013 the European team that has attempted since 2012 to promote a European Citizen Initiative to prosecute acts generating ecocide. In 2016, Georges Menahem has made conferences in the area of environmental justice, including Ukraine about considerable pollution of the Dnieper, actually in two presentations he made at the National University of Zaporozhye.

== Works ==
=== Recent works ===
- 2016, « Prolonger l'histoire de la justice internationale avec un tribunal international de la justice climatique », in Des droits pour la Terre, Les Editions Utopia, 2016
- 2013, « Trois modèles de protection sociale en Europe de 1995 à 2010 », Revue des possibles, n°1, Paris, October 2013
- 2012, "Beyond the GDP: toward social and environmental sustainability indicators", Side event presented with FAIR members on the June, 19 in the United Nations Conference known as Rio+20
- 2011, (with Jean Gadrey and several members of the forum FAIR) Indicators For a More Sustainable and Inclusive World, in Site of the UNCSD

=== Other works ===
- 2008, « How can the decommodified security ratio assess social protection systems? », Papelos de Tavajo n°11/08, in Publications of the Instituto de estudios fiscales, November, Madrid
- 2007, « The decommodified security ratio: A tool for assessing European social protection systems », International Social Security Review, Volume 60, Issue 4, page 69-103, October–December, Geneva, Switzerland
- 2007, « Prestations sociales, sécurité économique et croissance », Revue de l'OFCE, n°103, p. 291-322, December, Paris, France
- 2006, (with Marc Collet and Hervé Picard), « Why patients attending free health centres seek care », Issues in health economics, n° 113, October, IRDES, Paris, France
- 2006, (with Marc Collet and Hervé Picard), Medical reasons for using free healthcare centres and motives for using the services of consultants, biblio n° 1627, 167 p., IRDES, Paris, France
- 2006, "Santé : la dégradation", Chapter 10 in Pauvreté et inégalités, directed by Jean Gadrey, Fayard – Mille et une Nuits, pages 147–162, Paris, France
- 2005, (with Veneta Cherilova), « Inégalités de sécurité économique et aide à la famille dans l’Union européenne - La construction d’un indicateur de sécurité », in Recherches et Prévisions, n° 79, pp. 83–95, Paris, France
- 2004, « Inégalités sociales de santé et problèmes vécus lors de l’enfance », in La Revue du Praticien, vol.54, n° 20, Paris, France
- 2004, (with Catherine SERMET), "Pourquoi et comment mesurer la santé ?", Chapter in Politiques de santé - Refonder la solidarité, directed by Elisabeth Labaye, Institut de recherche de la FSU, Éditions Syllepse, pages 117–124, Paris, France
- 2004, "L'industrie pharmaceutique soumise à la logique du capital", Chapter in La santé mondiale entre racket et bien public, Éditions Charles Léopold Mayer, pages 89–99, Paris, France
- 2003, (with Marc Collet and Valérie Paris), "Précarités, risque et santé", Questions d’économie de la santé, n°63, IRDES, Paris, France
- 2002, (with Alice Beynet), Problèmes dentaires et précarité, IRDES, 164 p., Paris, France
- 2001, (with Thierry Adam, Pierre Alaignes and Christophe Ventura),Enquête au cœur des multinationales, 1001 nuits - Fayard, 160 p., Pari, France
- 2001, Chapter "Douleur", in Baromètre Santé 2000, Éditions du CFES, Vanves, vol. 2, pages 279–308, Paris, France
- 2000, "A target level of risk model of respiratory pathologies and smoking behaviour", Applied Economics, Vol. 31, Issue 6, pp. 709–722, London
- 1998, "Situations à risque de l’enfance, vulnérabilité sociale et troubles de santé à l’âge adulte", in Santé et Précarité, Flammarion, pages 97–98, Paris, France
- 1998, "Demande de soins, demande de santé, demande de sécurité : trois modèles pour la santé en économie", Les Cahiers du Gratice, N°129-130 (3–4), Paris, France
- 1997, "Recours aux soins des adultes et mode de gestion du risque", Économie et Prévision, N°129-130 (3–4), Paris, France
- 1996, "La santé est-elle un bien économique public ou privé ?", Prévenir, n° 30, Tours, France
- 1994, Problèmes de l'enfance, statut social et santé des adultes, IRDES, biblio n° 1010, 222 p., Paris, France
- 1994, (with Patrick Bantman, psychiatrist) "Représentations de l'enfance, troubles psychiques et maladies à caractère psychosomatique", Dialogue, n°126, 4ème trimestre, Paris, France
- 1994, (with Sophie Martin, anthropologist) "Quand l'enfance fait mal - Liaisons entre événements de l'enfance et sensibilité des adultes aux maladies", Dialogue - Recherches cliniques et sociologiques sur le couple et la famille, n°124, 2ème trimestre, Paris, France
- 1994, (with Patrick Bantman and Sophie Martin), « Événements de la jeunesse, trajectoires de vie et troubles de l'existence à l'âge adulte », in Trajectoires sociales et inégalités, Éditions Érès, Toulouse, France
- 1994, "La santé des adultes dépend fortement du climat familial de leur enfance", in INSEE-Résultats n°345-346, Consommation - Modes de vie, n°67-68, Paris, France
- 1992, "Troubles de santé à l'âge adulte et difficultés familiales durant l'enfance", Population, 4, INED, Paris, France
- 1990, "Incidents de paiement et trajectoires personnelles des débiteurs", Revue d'économie financière, n° 4, Paris, France
- 1989, "Les rapports domestiques entre femmes et hommes s'enracinent dans le passé familial des conjoints", Population, n°3, INED, Paris, France
- 1988, "Je veux mais nous pouvons : création conjugale et renaissance du moi", Dialogue, n° 102, Paris, France
- 1988, "Activité féminine ou inactivité : la marque de la famille du conjoint", Économie et Statistique, n° 211, INSEE, Paris, France
- 1988, "L'activité professionnelle des mères a augmenté les chances de réussite de leurs enfants", Économie et Statistique, n° 211, INSEE, Paris, France
- 1988, "Trois modes d'organisation domestique selon deux normes familiales font six types de famille", Population, n° 6, INED, Paris, France
- 1988, "La famille et le chômage", in L'enfance et la famille : questions en suspens, ACTIF-IDEF, n° 142–3, Vaucresson, France
- 1987, "Trois logiques familiales à l'œuvre dans les trajectoires sociales", Annales de Vaucresson, n° 26, Vaucresson, France
- 1985, « Le pire est-il inéluctable? », in 1984 et les présents de l'univers informationnel, C.C.I., Paris, France
- 1985, "Autonomie et transformations des familles dans la crise", in L'autonomie sociale aujourd'hui, Presses Universitaires de Grenoble, Grenoble, France
- 1984, "Activité professionnelle et stratégie familiale des femmes mariées", Travail et emploi, n° 22, Paris, France
- 1983, "Une famille, deux logiques, trois types d'organisation", Dialogue, n° 80, Paris, France
- 1982, "Mutation de la famille et travail des femmes", Spécial Issue of Revue Française des Affaires Sociales on "le travail des femmes", Paris, France
- 1980, "Les incidences des mutations de la famille sur les déterminants de l'activité économique : une hypothèse", Économie appliquée, n° 3 et 4, Paris, France
- 1980, (with Yves Lescot and Patrick Pharo), Les savoirs ouvriers, ACT, 164 p., Boulogne-Bilancoourt, France
- 1979, "Les mutations de la famille et les modes de reproduction de la force de travail", L'homme et la société, n° 51, Paris
- 1976, La science et le militaire, Seuil, 317 p., Paris
