= Decommodification =

Concept in political economy

In political economy, decommodification is a recently-developed word indicating the strength of social entitlement to goods and services, and citizens' degree of immunization from market dependency.

In regard to the labor force, decommodification describes a "degree to which individuals, or families, can uphold a socially acceptable standard of living independently of market participation".

While commodification is the transformation of goods, services, ideas and people into commodities or objects of trade, decommodification in employment terms means the "extent that workers can leave the labor market through choice". The term "decommodification" has also been applied to the processes through which goods and services can be made available commercially without entailing the "commodification" of the workforce which produces or provides them.

== Contemporary research ==
=== Gender inequality ===
The idea of decommodification as an egalitarian concept as set forth by Gøsta Esping-Andersen sparked contemporary research efforts focusing on perceived inequities. In 2008, a research journal pointed out a feminist critique that "the absolute focus on the welfare of individuals who are already working" leaves a central bias in the pursuit of decommodification. Rather, the objective of women is often to be commodified in the first place so that they can enter the labor market.

=== Environmental impact ===
Decommodification has been identified by ecological economists as a strategy for sustainable consumption that acts one level up on the institutional context of consumption in Western societies as compared to strategies such as eco-efficiency and eco-sufficiency. Thus, while the eco-efficiency strategy targets the product and the eco-sufficiency strategy targets the person (the consumer as decision-maker), the decommodification strategy targets the institutional context in which consumption takes place. It aims to decrease the influence of commodities and to limit the effect of commercialization.

=== Social democracy paradox ===
Esping-Andersen's fundamental study of decommodification sparked contemporary academic research efforts hoping to resolve "paradoxes" in this application. Exiting the labor market with little or no loss of income clashed with the idea that social democracy has the goal of high labor force participation. Research efforts to resolve this paradox showed that "employment impeding policies" came out of Christian democracy institutions, not social democracy institutions. This research suggests that decommodification in the social democratic model is viable.

== Example ==
Scandinavian countries are the closest to decommodification according to the scale created by Esping Andersen's research which places Sweden as the most decommodified country in the 1980s. Sweden's level of pensions, sickness entitlements and unemployment insurance are the highest among many other leading industrial countries. Sweden's social welfare programs are mandated by the government which also offers a de facto guarantee to the wages of citizens rather than taking averages and creating regulations through a means-based test on citizens' wages, level of education and their past history with the law.
