= Welfare state =

Form of government

Social expenditure as % of GDP (OECD)

A welfare state is a form of government in which the state (or a well-established network of social institutions) protects and promotes the economic and social well-being of its citizens, based upon the principles of equal opportunity, equitable distribution of wealth, and public responsibility for citizens unable to avail themselves of the minimal provisions for a good life.

There is substantial variability in the form and trajectory of the welfare state across countries and regions. All welfare states entail some degree of private–public partnerships wherein the administration and delivery of at least some welfare programs occur through private entities. Welfare state services are also provided at varying territorial levels of government.

The contemporary capitalist welfare state has been described as a type of mixed economy in the sense of state interventionism, as opposed to a mixture of planning and markets, since economic planning was not a key feature or component of the welfare state. Early features therein, such as public pensions and social insurance, developed from the 1880s onwards in industrializing Western countries. World War I, the Great Depression, and World War II have been characterized as important events that ushered in the expansion of the welfare state. The fullest forms of the welfare state were developed after World War II.

== Etymology ==
The term welfare is much older than the term welfare state. In enlightened absolutism, the ruler had an unlimited position of power, which he was to only utilize to the extent necessary for the "welfare" of his subjects. The content of the "welfare" or "good police", which limited the ruler's legitimate exercise of power, was defined by the authorities at their own discretion. This is also referred to as "welfare absolutism". The term welfare state is used in connection with princely absolutism, this is usually in conjunction with attributes such as absolutist, mercantilist or pre-modern.

The German term sozialstaat ("social state") has been used since 1870 to describe state support programs devised by German sozialpolitiker ("social politicians") and implemented as part of Otto von Bismarck's conservative reforms.

Today the term is used almost entirely for the "modern" welfare state, which emerged in the 19th century in the course of the socio-economic upheavals caused by industrialisation, the formation of nation states and democratization. While the corresponding English term welfare state is descriptively neutral, the term "Wohlfahrtsstaat" is often used in German as a fighting term with a pejorative connotation.

The literal English equivalent "social state" did not catch on in Anglophone countries. However, during the Second World War, Anglican Archbishop William Temple, author of the book Christianity and Social Order (1942), popularized the concept using the phrase "welfare state". Temple's use of "welfare state" has been connected to Benjamin Disraeli's 1845 novel Sybil: or the Two Nations (in other words, the rich and the poor), where he writes "power has only one duty – to secure the social welfare of the PEOPLE". At the time he wrote Sybil, Disraeli (later a prime minister) belonged to Young England, a conservative group of youthful Tories who disagreed with how the Whigs dealt with the conditions of the industrial poor. Members of Young England attempted to garner support among the privileged classes to assist the less fortunate and to recognize the dignity of labor that they imagined had characterized England during the Feudal Middle Ages.

== History ==
=== Ancient ===
==== India ====
Emperor Ashoka of India put forward his idea of a welfare state in the 3rd century BCE. He envisioned his dharma (religion or path) as not just a collection of high-sounding phrases. He consciously tried to adopt it as a matter of state policy; he declared that "all men are my children" and "whatever exertion I make, I strive only to discharge debt that I owe to all living creatures." It was a completely new ideal of kingship. Ashoka renounced war and conquest by violence and forbade the killing of many animals. Since he wanted to conquer the world through love and faith, he sent many missions to propagate Dharma. Such missions were sent to places like Egypt, Greece, and Sri Lanka. The propagation of Dharma included many measures of people's welfare. Centers of the treatment of men and beasts founded inside and outside of the empire. Shady groves, wells, orchards and rest houses were laid out. Ashoka also prohibited useless sacrifices and certain forms of gatherings which led to waste, indiscipline and superstition. To implement these policies he recruited a new cadre of officers called Dharmamahamattas. Part of this group's duties was to see that people of various sects were treated fairly. They were especially asked to look after the welfare of prisoners.

However, the historical record of Ashoka's character is conflicted. Ashoka's own inscriptions state that he converted to Buddhism after waging a destructive war. However, the Sri Lankan tradition claims that he had already converted to Buddhism in the 4th year of his reign, although it does not mention the conquest of Kalinga. During this war, according to Ashoka's Major Rock Edict 13, with nearly 100,000 killed in the war and another 150,000 deported. Some sources (particularly Buddhist oral legends) suggest that his conversion was dramatic and that he dedicated the rest of his life to the pursuit of peace and the common good. However, these sources frequently contradict each other, and a few sources (like Ashokavadana, earliest versions ranging from 200 AD to 500 AD) describe Ashoka engaging in sectarian mass murder throughout his reign, and make no mention of the philanthropic efforts claimed by earlier legends. The interpretation of Ashoka's dharma after conversion is controversial, but in particular, the texts which describe him personally ordering the massacre of Buddhist heretics and Jains have been disputed by many scholars, since these are directly contradictory to his own edicts, and are legendary in nature.

According to one study, Ashoka developed “a very comprehensive system of social welfare which included women’s welfare, rehabilitation of prisoners, rural development, free medical care, regulation of prostitution and provision of public utilities like roads, rest houses for travellers, wells, etc.”

==== China ====
The Hongwu Emperor Zhu Yuanzhang Emperor Wen (203 – 157 BCE) of Han Dynasty instituted a variety of measures with resemblances to modern welfare policies. These included pensions, in the form of food and wine, to all over 80 years of age, as well as monetary support, in the form of loans or tax breaks, to widows, orphans, and elderly without children to support them.

In 1386, Zhu Yuanzhang issued an edict that stipulated that (as noted by one study) “the poor people aged above 80 will be granted with 30kg of rice, 2.5mg of meat and 1.8kg of wine each month; those aged above 90 will receive additional 33 m of silk and 0.6kg of cotton wool.”

Emperor Wen was known for a concern over wasteful spending of tax-payer money. Unlike other Han emperors, he wore simple silk garments. In order to make the state serve the common people better, cruel criminal punishments were lessened and the state bureaucracy was made more meritocratic. This led to officials being selected by examinations for the first time in Chinese history.

Various forms of social welfare also existed in other periods such as the Zhou period and the Song dynasty.

==== Inca Empire ====
A social welfare system existed under the Incas consisting of a community fund of goods to provide for orphans, the sick, the elderly, and the poor. As noted by Robert Marett (diplomat), part of the economic policy of the Inca Empire was that “nobody in the land should go in want for essential food and clothing and a roof over his head.” Marett, however, has argued that the welfare system operated by the Inca Empire was not a lavish one, arguing that “Freedom from want for the mass of the people meant two extremely frugal meals a day; clothes which could not be renewed until they were in tatters; no shoes; a one-room house without windows; a field and two llamas for each head of family; a life of toil only relieved by an occasional fiesta, when the chicha would flow freely and for a moment the peasant could forget the hard world into which he had been born.”

Adding to these points, Marett argued that the policy of the economic planners was not to make life better for the common people, with human beings (according to Marett) “considered by the Inca to be no more than cogs in a machine.” Nevertheless, Marett has noted how people during famines were helped from central stores and that those who were too sick or old to work “would be assured of a bare living.”

According to another observer, Patrick Richardson, the Inca Empire was “an early welfare state, providing for the old, the ill, the young and the hungry.” In addition, “Apart from the Emperor and the true Inca caste around him there was little inequality of wealth.” According to Alan Hamilton, the Inca Empire had a social welfare system “unparallelled in Europe.”

Also, as noted by William H. Prescott

With their manifold provisions against poverty the reader has already been made acquainted. They were so perfect, that, in their wide extent of territory,— much of it smitten with the curse of barrenness, — no man, however humble, suffered from the want of food and clothing. Famine, so common a scourge in every other American nation, so common at that period in every country of civilized Europe, was an evil unknown in the dominions of the Incas.

==== Ancient Rome ====
The Roman Republic intervened sporadically to distribute free or subsidized grain to its population, through the program known as cura annonae. The city of Rome grew rapidly during the Roman Republic and Empire, reaching a population approaching one million in the second century AD. The population of the city grew beyond the capacity of the nearby rural areas to meet the food needs of the city.

Regular grain distribution began in 123 BC with a grain law proposed by Gaius Gracchus and approved by the Roman plebeian council (popular assembly). The numbers of those receiving free or subsidized grain expanded to a high of an estimated 320,000 people at one point. In the 3rd century AD, the dole of grain was replaced by bread, probably during the reign of Septimius Severus (193–211 AD). Severus also began providing olive oil to residents of Rome, and later the emperor Aurelian (270–275) ordered the distribution of wine and pork. The doles of bread, olive oil, wine, and pork apparently continued until near the end of the Western Roman Empire in 476 AD. The dole in the early Roman Empire is estimated to account for 15 to 33 percent of the total grain imported and consumed in Rome.

In addition to food, the Roman Republic also supplied free entertainment, through ludi (public games). Public money was allocated for the staging of ludi, but the presiding official increasingly came to augment the splendor of his games from personal funds as a form of public relations. The sponsor was able to cultivate the favor of the people of Rome. Under Augustus (27BC – AD14), cash benefits were distributed and investments in the supply of water and housing were carried out for the benefit of the plebeians.

=== Islamic Caliphate ===
The concept of states taxing for the welfare budget was introduced to the Arabs in the early 7th century by Caliph Umar, most likely adapted from the newly conquered Roman territories. Zakat is also one of the five pillars of Islam and is a mandatory form of 2.5% wealth tax to be paid by all individuals holding above a basic threshold (nisab) to provide for the needy once a year after Ramadan. Umar (584–644), leader of the Rashidun Caliphate (empire), established a welfare state through the Bayt al-mal (treasury), which for instance was used to stockpile food in every region of the Islamic Empire reserved for Muslims in the Peninsula. Numerous social programs were established during his reign, including child benefits, pensions, income support, and various stipends for non-Muslims. Social welfare was also emphasized under a number of other caliphs such as Umar ibn Abd al-Aziz, who presided over a significant reduction of poverty during his reign.

=== Modern ===
Otto von Bismarck established the first welfare state in a modern industrial society, with social-welfare legislation, in 1880s Imperial Germany. Bismarck extended the privileges of the Junker social class to ordinary Germans. His 17 November 1881 Imperial Message to the Reichstag used the term "practical Christianity" to describe his program. German laws from this era also insured workers against industrial risks inherent in the workplace.

In Switzerland, the Swiss Factory Act of 1877 limited working hours for everyone, and gave maternity benefits. The Swiss welfare state also arose in the late 19th century; its existence and depth varied individually by canton. Some of the programs first adopted were emergency relief, elementary schools, and homes for the elderly and children.

In the Austro-Hungarian Empire, a version was set up by Count Eduard von Taaffe a few years after Bismarck in Germany. Legislation to help the working class in Austria emerged from Catholic conservatives. Von Taffe used Swiss and German models of social reform, including the Swiss Factory Act of 1877 German laws that insured workers against industrial risks inherent in the workplace to create the 1885 Trade Code Amendment.

Changed attitudes in reaction to the worldwide Great Depression of the 1930s, which brought unemployment and misery to millions, were instrumental in the move to the welfare state in many countries. During the Great Depression, the welfare state was seen as a "middle way" between the extremes of communism on the left and unregulated laissez-faire capitalism on the right. In the period following World War II, some countries in Western Europe moved from partial or selective provision of social services to relatively comprehensive "cradle-to-grave" coverage of the population. Other Western European states did not, such as the United Kingdom, Ireland, Spain and France. Political scientist Eileen McDonagh has argued that a major determinant of where welfare states arose is whether or not a country had a historical monarchy with familial foundations (a trait that Max Weber called patrimonialism); in places where the monarchic state was viewed as a parental steward of the populace, it was easier to shift into a mindset where the industrial state could also serve as a parental steward of the populace.

The activities of present-day welfare states extend to the provision of both cash welfare benefits (such as old-age pensions or unemployment benefits) and in-kind welfare services (such as health or childcare services). Through these provisions, welfare states can affect the distribution of wellbeing and personal autonomy among their citizens, as well as influencing how their citizens consume and how they spend their time.

=== Analysis ===
In Europe, the idea of the welfare state was mainly championed by socialist and social-democratic circles, although it also had supporters in the centre (the concept of the “welfare state” was coined by the liberal William Beveridge) and even among conservatives.

Corporatist welfare states, such as those created by Bismarck and von Taffe, were initially designed to create divisions among the working class and thereby undermine the power of organised labour, as well as to tie the individual closer to the state. Therefore, socialists and working-class organisations were initially sceptical of welfare states, and opted instead to organise into self-organised welfare societies.

Historian of the 20th-century fascist movement, Robert Paxton, observes that the provisions of the welfare state were enacted in the 19th century by religious conservatives to counteract appeals from trade unions and socialism. Later, Paxton writes "All the modern twentieth-century European dictatorships of the right, both fascist and authoritarian, were welfare states… They all provided medical care, pensions, affordable housing, and mass transport as a matter of course, in order to maintain productivity, national unity, and social peace." In Germany, Adolf Hitler's Nazi Party maintained the welfare state established by previous German governments, but restructured it so as to help only Aryan individuals considered worthy of assistance, excluding "alcoholics, tramps, homosexuals, prostitutes, the 'work-shy' or the 'asocial', habitual criminals, the hereditarily ill (a widely defined category) and members of races other than the Aryan." Nevertheless, even with these limitations, over 17 million German citizens were receiving assistance under the auspices of the National Socialist People's Welfare by 1939. However, Adam Tooze (in his book The Wages of Destruction) downplayed the importance of Nazi social policies, as most resources were concentrated on rearmament. The promised low-cost consumer goods, such as the Volkswagen car, only became available after the war, with the exception of the Volksempfänger radio, since it was useful for propaganda purposes.

In 2005 Kahl contributed a theory for the different kinds of public welfare in the West in "The religious roots of modern policy: Catholic, Lutheran and Reformed Protestant traditions compared". She argues that the welfare policies of several European politics are determined by their predominant religion. This process originated in "poor relief" systems and social norms of Christian nations, categorized as follows: Catholic (Spain, Italy and France); Lutheran (Denmark, Sweden and Germany); and Reformed Protestant (Netherlands, the UK and the USA).

The Catholic countries adopted both welfare benefits and social assistance late, the latter being splintered and meagre due to religious and social factors. Giving alms was an important part of Catholic society and organized religion. The wealthy could atone for their sins through it. As such, begging was allowed and was more socially acceptable. Poverty could be a form of detachment from material things and therefore dispose one to additional grace, and the poor were not compelled to increase material wealth. These factors, coupled with the power of the Church meant that state-provided benefits did not arise until late in the 20th century. Additionally, social assistance was not comprehensive: each group in need incrementally was assisted more. This accounts for the fragmented nature of social assistance in these countries.

Lutheran states were early to provide welfare yet late to provide social assistance, but did so uniformly. Poverty was seen as more of an individual affliction with laziness and immorality. Work was viewed as a calling. As such these societies banned begging and created workhouses to force the able-bodied to work. These uniform state actions paved the way for comprehensive welfare benefits, because workers deserved assistance when in need. When social assistance was given to those who had never worked, it was in the context of uniform welfare provision to all.

The peculiar Reformed Protestant conception of predestination is key for understanding welfare assistance in states of that religion. Poverty was seen as Divine punishment, and therefore begging and state assistance were thought contrary to the will of God and were not permitted. As such churches and charities filled the void, resulting in early social assistance and late welfare benefits. The USA still grants comparatively low welfare benefits today because of its original religious tenets, according to Kahl.

Also in 2005, Jacob Hacker stated that there was "broad agreement" in research on welfare that there had not been retrenchment of welfare states. Instead, "social policy frameworks remain secure."

== Forms ==
Broadly speaking, welfare states are either universal, with provisions that cover everybody, or selective, with provisions covering only those deemed most needy. In his 1990 book, The Three Worlds of Welfare Capitalism, Danish sociologist Gøsta Esping-Andersen further identified three subtypes of welfare state models: liberal, social-democratic, and conservative.

- Liberal welfare states are characterized by a lack of strong working-class mobilization and an absence of an absolutist political history. These systems primarily rely on means-tested benefits, offering limited social insurance while actively promoting private welfare provisions. Notable examples include the United States, Canada, and Australia.
- Conservative corporatist welfare states are influenced by a Catholic conservative tradition and have a history of political absolutism. They prioritize social insurance schemes over means-tested assistance or private benefits, yet they limit income redistribution. Countries such as Austria, Italy, France, and Germany exemplify this model.
- Socialist (or social democratic) welfare states are distinguished by significant working-class participation in governance and the presence of influential social democratic parties. These states implement comprehensive welfare policies that emphasize income redistribution and incorporate labor market strategies to support unemployed individuals.

Esping-Anderson development of the three subtypes of welfare regimes were categorized under three dimensions: 1) state and market relations or the relationship between the state and market, 2) stratification or social relations and relationships, 3) social citizenship rights or whether or not an individual is dependent on the labor market.

Since the building of the decommodification index is limited (Note: According to the French sociologist Georges Menahem, Esping-Andersen's "decommodification index" aggregates both qualitative and quantitative variables for "sets of dimensions" which fluid, and pertain to three very different areas. These characters involve similar limits of the validity of the index and of its potential for replication. Cf. Menahem 2007.) and the typology is debatable, these 18 countries could be ranked from most purely social-democratic (Sweden) to the most liberal (the United States). Ireland represents a near-hybrid model whereby two streams of unemployment benefit exist: contributory and means-tested. However, payments can begin immediately and are theoretically available to all Irish citizens even if they have never worked, provided they are habitually resident.

Social stigma varies across the three conceptual welfare states. Particularly, it is highest in liberal states, and lowest in social democratic states. Esping-Andersen proposes that the universalist nature of social democratic states eliminate the duality between beneficiaries and non-recipients, whereas in means-tested liberal states there is resentment towards redistribution efforts. That is to say, the lower the percent of GDP spent on welfare, the higher the stigma of the welfare state. Esping-Andersen also argues that welfare states set the stage for post-industrial employment evolution in terms of employment growth, structure, and stratification. He uses Germany, Sweden, and the United States to provide examples of the differing results of each of the three welfare states.

According to Evelyne Huber and John Stephens, different types of welfare states emerged as a result of prolonged government by different parties. They distinguish between social democratic welfare states, Christian democratic welfare states, and "wage earner" states.

According to the Swedish political scientist Bo Rothstein, in non-universal welfare states, the state is primarily concerned with directing resources to "the people most in need". This requires tight bureaucratic control in order to determine who is eligible for assistance and who is not. Under universal models such as Sweden, on the other hand, the state distributes welfare to all people who fulfill easily established criteria (e.g. having children, receiving medical treatment, etc.) with as little bureaucratic interference as possible. This, however, requires higher taxation due to the scale of services provided. This model was constructed by the Scandinavian ministers Karl Kristian Steincke and Gustav Möller in the 1930s and is dominant in Scandinavia.

Sociologist Lane Kenworthy argues that the Nordic experience demonstrates that the modern social democratic model can "promote economic security, expand opportunity, and ensure rising living standards for all ... while facilitating freedom, flexibility and market dynamism."

American political scientist Benjamin Radcliff has also argued that the universality and generosity of the welfare state (i.e. the extent of decommodification) is the single most important societal-level structural factor affecting the quality of human life, based on the analysis of time serial data across both the industrial democracies and the American States. He maintains that the welfare state improves life for everyone, regardless of social class (as do similar institutions, such as pro-worker labor market regulations and strong labor unions). (Note: See also "this collection of full-text peer-reviewed scholarly articles on this subject" by Radcliff and colleagues (such as "Social Forces," "The Journal of Politics," and "Perspectives on Politics," among others)) Opinion polls show extending welfare to non-citizens is unpopular.

=== Gender and welfare ===
Esping-Andersen's welfare typology is often criticized by feminists for being gender blind. According to Keerty Nakray, Esping-Andersen's three types of dimensions (state and market relations, stratification, and social citizenship rights) does not acknowledge unpaid care-work done by women within the household economy. This failure of recognizing unpaid work is due to the fact that welfare states are focused on the male-breadwinner concept. Because Esping-Andersen argued that the welfare state set the stage for employment evolution, the lack of gender analysis creates an unintended emphasis on male employment.

Welfare Scholar Peter Dwyer goes further to consider the question of gender and citizenship by showing that it is not gender blind, but citizenship by default is considered masculine, and women are not given citizenship rights. Dwyer explains that citizenship that is considered "male" is seen as "public citizens" who have traits like rationality and impartiality that make them responsible citizens. On the other hand, Dwyer lays out women's construction of "private non-citizen," where women are the opposite of men, being irrational, emotional, and ill-equipped to handle the responsibilities of citizenship. This construction of men and women helps explain why citizenship rights and welfare rights are more difficult for women to access. All of these inequities in citizenship rights are only made more intense when other intersectional factors are considered including race, class, sexuality, and education. Dwyer then introduces the concepts of the "caregiver parity model" and the "universal breadwinner model" as ways to allow women easier access to the welfare state. In the caregiver parity model, according to Reid, women have equal access to childcare. This then allows women to access the labor market freely, offering them the same opportunity as when they receive welfare benefits. On the other hand, the universal breadwinner model, as explained by Lister, focuses less on care work responsibilities and more on women's economic employment opportunities with the belief that access to employment will lead to more equal welfare benefits. As pointed out by Dwyer, both models allow significant opportunities and challenges for advancing women's welfare citizenship.

Sociologist Ann Shola Orloff reframes the three dimensions with a gendered lens. As she reframes, Orloff incorporates gender and expands the decommodification index within three dimensions: 1) focus on families and the welfare states in state and market relations, 2) including the relationship between gender and labor in stratifications on social provisions, 3) how men and women are dependent on the labor market and the effect of welfare on decommodification for both genders. Reframing the decommodification index with a gendered lens ensures women doing care-work are not left behind within the welfare state.

=== UBI as a replacement for the welfare state ===
Universal basic income (UBI) has been proposed as a replacement for the traditional welfare state where social protection schemes are also social policies with a precise aim that can be regarded as social engineering. The focus of the UBI is granting individuals more freedom in determining life choices by providing a lifetime of financial security regardless of one's career preferences or lifepath.

The American conservative political scientist Charles Murray has outlined a UBI plan which, in 2014 in the United States of America, would have cost $200 billion less than existing welfare programs. By the year 2020, it would have cost about $1 trillion less.

== By country ==
=== Australia ===
Prior to 1900 in Australia, charitable assistance from benevolent societies, sometimes with financial contributions from the authorities, was the primary means of relief for people not able to support themselves. The 1890s economic depression and the rise of the trade unions and the Labor parties during this period led to a movement for welfare reform.

In 1900, New South Wales and Victoria enacted legislation introducing non-contributory pensions for those aged 65 and over. Queensland legislated a similar system in 1907 before the Deakin government introduced a national aged pension under the Invalid and Old-Aged Pensions Act 1908. A national invalid disability pension was started in 1910, and a national maternity allowance was introduced by the Fisher government in 1912.

In the 1920s and 1930s, detailed proposals were developed for a comprehensive national insurance scheme covering medical, disability, unemployment and pension benefits. Multiple royal commissions were held on the subject and the scheme was legislated as the National Health and Pensions Insurance Act 1938. However, the scheme was ultimately abandoned for cost reasons in the lead-up to the Second World War.

During the Second World War, the federal government created a welfare state by enacting national schemes for: child endowment in 1941; a widows' pension in 1942; a wife's allowance in 1943; additional allowances for the children of pensioners in 1943; and unemployment, sickness, and special benefits in 1945.

Medicare is Australia's publicly funded universal health care insurance scheme. Initially created in 1975 by the Whitlam Labor government under the name "Medibank". The Fraser Liberal government made significant changes to it from 1976 leading to its abolition in late 1981. The Hawke government reinstated universal health care in 1984 under the name "Medicare".

=== Brunei ===
Brunei operates a comprehensive welfare state, primarily funded by its substantial oil and gas revenues, which account for approximately 65% of its GDP and 90% of government income. This wealth enables the government to provide citizens with extensive benefits, including free education, free or heavily subsidized healthcare, public housing, and various subsidies on essential goods like fuel and food. Notably, Bruneians pay no personal income tax, and the state covers many living expenses.

However, Brunei's heavy reliance on hydrocarbon resources poses sustainability challenges, especially amid global shifts toward renewable energy. Recognizing this, the government has initiated economic diversification efforts under the "Wawasan Brunei 2035" vision, aiming to reduce dependence on oil and gas by developing sectors like technology, tourism, and agriculture. Despite these initiatives, progress has been gradual, and the long-term viability of Brunei's welfare model remains contingent on successful economic transformation.

=== Canada ===
Canada's welfare programs are funded and administered at all levels of government (with 13 different provincial/territorial systems), and include health and medical care, public education (through graduate school), social housing and social services. Social support is given through programs including Social Assistance, Guaranteed Income Supplement, Child Tax Benefit, Old Age Security, Employment Insurance, Workers' Compensation, and the Canada/Quebec Pension Plans.

=== China ===
China traditionally relied on the extended family to provide welfare services. The one-child policy introduced in 1978 has made that unrealistic, and new models have emerged since the 1980s as China has rapidly become richer and more urban. Much discussion is underway regarding China's proposed path toward a welfare state. Chinese policies have been incremental and fragmented in terms of social insurance, privatization, and targeting. In the cities, where the rapid economic development has centered, lines of cleavage have developed between state-sector and non-state-sector employees, and between labor-market insiders and outsiders.

=== France ===
After 1830, French liberalism and economic modernization were key goals. While liberalism was individualistic and laissez-faire in the United Kingdom and the United States, in France liberalism was based instead on a solidaristic conception of society, following the theme of the French Revolution, Liberté, égalité, fraternité ("liberty, equality, fraternity"). In the Third Republic, especially between 1895 and 1914 "Solidarité" ["solidarism"] was the guiding concept of a liberal social policy, whose chief champions were the prime ministers Leon Bourgeois (1895–96) and Pierre Waldeck-Rousseau (1899–1902). The French welfare state expanded when it tried to follow some of Bismarck's policies. Poor relief was the starting point. More attention was paid to industrial labour in the 1930s during a short period of socialist political ascendency, with the Matignon Accords and the reforms of the Popular Front. Paxton points out these reforms were paralleled and even exceeded by measures taken by the Vichy regime in the 1940s.

=== Germany ===
Some policies enacted to enhance social welfare in Germany were Health Insurance 1883, Accident Insurance 1884, Old Age Pensions 1889 and National Unemployment Insurance 1927. Otto von Bismarck, the powerful Chancellor of Germany (in office 1871–90), developed the first modern welfare state by building on a tradition of welfare programs in Prussia and Saxony that had begun as early as in the 1840s. The measures that Bismarck introduced – old-age pensions, accident insurance, and employee health insurance – formed the basis of the modern European welfare state. His paternalistic programs aimed to forestall social unrest and to undercut the appeal of the new Social Democratic Party, and to secure the support of the working classes for the German Empire, as well as to reduce emigration to the United States, where wages were higher but welfare did not exist. Bismarck further won the support of both industry and skilled workers through his high-tariff policies, which protected profits and wages from American competition, although they alienated the liberal intellectuals who wanted free trade.

During the 12 years of rule by Adolf Hitler's Nazi Party, the welfare state established by previous German governments was maintained, but it was restructured so as to help only Aryan individuals considered worthy of assistance, excluding "alcoholics, tramps, homosexuals, prostitutes, the 'work-shy' or the 'asocial', habitual criminals, the hereditarily ill (a widely defined category) and members of races other than the Aryan." Nevertheless, even with these limitations, over 17 million German citizens received assistance under the auspices of the Nationalsozialistische Volkswohlfahrt (NSV) by 1939. The agency projected a powerful image of caring and support for those who were seen as full members of the German racial community, but it also inspired fear through its intrusive questioning and the threat of opening investigations on those who did not fulfill the criteria for support.

=== India ===
The Directive Principles of State Policy, enshrined in Part IV of the Indian Constitution reflects that India is a welfare state. Food security to all Indians is guaranteed under the National Food Security Act, 2013 where the government provides food grains to people at a very subsidised rate.

Since 2001, India has developed a strong welfare state with continuous increase in government expenditure on the social sector over the years. The general government's expenditure on social security and welfare which includes health insurances and public hospitals, education, grants for housing, financial transfers to the poor, free bus or metro tickets, unemployment benefits and a variety of social pensions was approximately ₹7,164,000 crore (US$770 billion) in 2022, representing 8.4 percent of gross domestic product (GDP).

=== Singapore ===
In Singapore, the government provides financial and social support through a variety of social assistance schemes for lower and middle-income Singaporeans. The Ministry of Social and Family Development runs ComCare, a program which provides income support for low-income citizen households through various schemes for short-to-medium term assistance, long-term assistance, child support, and urgent financial needs. The Community Development Councils also run various local assistance schemes within their districts. The Ministry of Manpower runs a Silver Support Scheme which provides additional financial support for low-income elderly with no family support. Meanwhile, the Ministry of Health also runs MediFund to assist anyone on their behalf to pay off the rest of their medical bills after initial government subsidies, other health financing schemes as well as funds from the Central Provident Fund has been used.

In 2012, the Community Health Assist Scheme (CHAS) was introduced. It is a medical card that provides extended subsidies exclusively for Singaporean citizens usually from lower-to-middle income households, as well as the older generations, where they could receive treatment for common illnesses, chronic health problems and specific dental issues at private clinics for free. The intentions behind the scheme were to encourage Singaporeans to use such a card and tap into the private healthcare sector for common or minor chronic illnesses, as well as dental care, to reduce the strain at public community hospitals. Originally, only a blue and orange card existed, depending on their household income. The CHAS scheme was further expanded in 2019 to include a new green card that provides for all Singaporeans no matter their household income. As a result, all Singaporeans became covered for chronic and common illnesses as well as dentistry at privately owned clinics. Subsidies for complex chronic conditions was also increased.

In addition, the National Council of Social Service coordinates a range of 450 non-government voluntary welfare organisations to provide social services, while raising funds through The Community Chest of Singapore. Taking the World Bank's International Poverty Line (IPL)'s poverty threshold into account, the population of Singaporeans living below the poverty line is virtually non-existent. Singapore also has one of the highest housing ownership rates in the world – over 90 percent – owing to the government's policy of constructing extensive and quality public housing throughout the country and providing extensive subsidies for its citizens to obtain them.

=== Sri Lanka ===
In 1995, the government started the Samurdhi (Prosperity) program aimed at reducing poverty, having replaced the Jana Saviya poverty alleviation programme that was in place at the time.

=== United Kingdom ===
About the British welfare state, historian Derek Fraser wrote:

It germinated in the social thought of late Victorian liberalism, reached its infancy in the collectivism of the pre-and post-Great War statism, matured in the universalism of the 1940s and flowered in full bloom in the consensus and affluence of the 1950s and 1960s. By the 1970s it was in decline, like the faded rose of autumn. Both UK and US governments are pursuing in the 1980s monetarist policies inimical to welfare.

The modern welfare state in the United Kingdom began operations with the Liberal welfare reforms of 1906–1914 under Liberal Prime Minister H. H. Asquith. These included the passing of the Old Age Pensions Act 1908, the introduction of free school meals in 1909, the Labour Exchanges Act 1909, the Development and Road Improvement Funds Act 1909, which heralded greater government intervention in economic development, and the National Insurance Act 1911 setting up a national insurance contribution for unemployment and health benefits from work.

The People's Budget was introduced by the Chancellor of the Exchequer, David Lloyd George, in 1909 to fund the welfare reforms. After much opposition, it was passed by the House of Lords on 29 April 1910.

The minimum wage was introduced in the United Kingdom in 1909 for certain low-wage industries and expanded to numerous industries, including farm labour, by 1920. However, by the 1920s, a new perspective was offered by reformers to emphasize the usefulness of family allowance targeted at low-income families as the alternative to relieving poverty without distorting the labour market. The trade unions and the Labour Party adopted this view. In 1945, family allowances were introduced; minimum wages faded from view. Talk resumed in the 1970s, but in the 1980s the Thatcher administration made it clear it would not accept a national minimum wage. Finally, with the return of Labour, the National Minimum Wage Act 1998 set a minimum of £3.60 per hour, with lower rates for younger workers. It largely affected workers in high-turnover service industries such as fast-food restaurants, and members of ethnic minorities.

December 1942 saw the publication of the Report of the Inter-Departmental Committee on Social Insurance and Allied Services, commonly known as the Beveridge Report after its chairman, Sir William Beveridge. The Beveridge Report proposed a series of measures to aid those who were in need of help, or in poverty and recommended that the government find ways of tackling what the report called "the five giants": Want, Disease, Ignorance, Squalor, and Idleness. It urged the government to take steps to provide citizens with adequate income, adequate health care, adequate education, adequate housing, and adequate employment, proposing that "all people of working age should pay a weekly National Insurance contribution. In return, benefits would be paid to people who were sick, unemployed, retired, or widowed." The Beveridge Report assumed that the National Health Service would provide free health care to all citizens and that a Universal Child Benefit would give benefits to parents, encouraging people to have children by enabling them to feed and support a family.

The Liberal Party, the Conservative Party, and then the Labour Party all adopted the Beveridge Report's recommendations. Following the Labour election victory in the 1945 general election many of Beveridge's reforms were implemented through a series of Acts of Parliament. On 5 July 1948, the National Insurance Act, National Assistance Act and National Health Service Act came into force, forming the key planks of the modern UK welfare state. In 1949, the Legal Aid and Advice Act was passed, providing the "fourth pillar" of the modern welfare state, access to advice for legal redress for all.

Before 1939, most health care had to be paid for through non-government organisations – through a vast network of friendly societies, trade unions, and other insurance companies, which counted the vast majority of the UK working population as members. These organizations provided insurance for sickness, unemployment, and disability, providing an income to people when they were unable to work. As part of the reforms, the Church of England also closed down its voluntary relief networks and passed the ownership of thousands of church schools, hospitals and other bodies to the state.

Welfare systems continued to develop over the following decades. By the end of the 20th century parts of the welfare system had been restructured, with some provision channelled through non-governmental organizations which became important providers of social services.

=== United States ===
The United States developed a limited welfare state in the 1930s. The earliest and most comprehensive philosophical justification for the welfare state was produced by an American, the sociologist Lester Frank Ward (1841–1913), whom the historian Henry Steele Commager called "the father of the modern welfare state".

Ward saw social phenomena as amenable to human control. "It is only through the artificial control of natural phenomena that science is made to minister to human needs" he wrote, "and if social laws are really analogous to physical laws, there is no reason why social science should not receive practical application such as have been given to physical science." Ward wrote:

The charge of paternalism is chiefly made by the class that enjoys the largest share of government protection. Those who denounce it are those who most frequently and successfully invoke it. Nothing is more obvious today than the single inability of capital and private enterprise to take care of themselves unaided by the state; and while they are incessantly denouncing "paternalism," by which they mean the claim of the defenceless laborer and artisan to a share in this lavish state protection, they are all the while besieging legislatures for relief from their own incompetency, and "pleading the baby act" through a trained body of lawyers and lobbyists. The dispensing of national pap to this class should rather be called "maternalism," to which a square, open, and dignified paternalism would be infinitely preferable.

Ward's theories centred around his belief that a universal and comprehensive system of education was necessary if a democratic government was to function successfully. His writings profoundly influenced younger generations of progressive thinkers such as Theodore Roosevelt, Thomas Dewey, and Frances Perkins (1880–1965), among others.

The United States was the only industrialized country that went into the Great Depression of the 1930s with no social insurance policies in place. In 1935 Franklin D. Roosevelt's New Deal instituted significant social insurance policies. In 1938 Congress passed the Fair Labor Standards Act, limiting the work week to 40 hours and banning child labor for children under 16, over stiff congressional opposition from the low-wage South.

The Social Security law was very unpopular among many groups – especially farmers, who resented the additional taxes and feared they would never be worth it. They lobbied hard for exclusion. Furthermore, the Treasury realized how difficult it would be to set up payroll deduction plans for farmers, for housekeepers who employed maids, and for non-profit groups; therefore, they were excluded. State employees were excluded for constitutional reasons (the federal government in the United States cannot tax state governments). Federal employees were also excluded.

The Great Society was enacted by President Lyndon B. Johnson between 1964 and 1968, aimed at eliminating poverty, reducing racial injustice, and expanding social welfare in the country. The Great Society sought to build on the legacy of former President Franklin D. Roosevelt's New Deal reforms of the 1930s, and planned to use the power of the federal government in order to address economic inequality, improve education and healthcare, and promote civil rights.

By 2013, the U.S. remained the only major industrial state without a uniform national sickness program. American spending on health care (as a percent of GDP) is the highest in the world, but it is a complex mix of federal, state, philanthropic, employer and individual funding. The US spent 16% of its GDP on health care in 2008, compared to 11% in France in second place.

Some scholars, such as Gerard Friedman, argue that labor-union weakness in the Southern United States undermined unionization and social reform throughout the United States as a whole, and is largely responsible for the anemic U.S. welfare state. Sociologists Loïc Wacquant and John L. Campbell contend that since the rise of neoliberal ideology in the late 1970s and early 1980s, an expanding carceral state, or government system of mass incarceration, has largely supplanted the increasingly retrenched social welfare state, which has been justified by its proponents with the argument that the citizenry must take on personal responsibility. Scholars assert that this transformation of the welfare state to a post-welfare punitive state, along with neoliberal structural adjustment policies and the globalization of the U.S. economy, have created more extreme forms of "destitute poverty" in the U.S. which must be contained and controlled by expanding the criminal justice system into every aspect of the lives of the poor.

Other scholars such as Esping-Andersen argue that the welfare state in the United States has been characterized by private provision because such a state would better reflect the racial and sexual biases within the private sector. The disproportionate number of racial and sexual minorities in private sector jobs with weaker benefits, he argues, is evidence that the American welfare state is not necessarily intended to improve the economic situation of such groups.

Political scientist Julia Lynch posits that the United States differs from countries with similar welfare states with a focus on only helping the "deserving" and tax incentives over providing cash incentives to provide a baseline standard of living. This leads the system to primarily benefit the elderly, as they are more often considered deserving after a lifetime of work and tend to be better positioned to benefit from tax incentives.

== By region ==
=== Latin America ===
Welfare states in Latin America have been considered as "welfare states in transition", or "emerging welfare states". Welfare states in Latin America have been described as "truncated": generous benefits for formal-sector workers, regressive subsidies and informal barriers for the poor to obtain benefits. Mesa-Lago has classified the countries taking into account the historical experience of their welfare systems. The pioneers were Uruguay, Chile and Argentina, as they started to develop the first welfare programs in the 1920s following a bismarckian model. Other countries such as Costa Rica developed a more universal welfare system (1960s–1970s) with social security programs based on the Beveridge model. Researchers such as Martinez-Franzoni and Barba-Solano have examined and identified several welfare regime models based on the typology of Esping-Andersen. Other scholars such as Riesco and Cruz-Martinez have examined the welfare state development in the region.

About welfare states in Latin America, Alex Segura-Ubiergo wrote:

Latin American countries can be unequivocally divided into two groups depending on their 'welfare effort' levels. The first group, which for convenience we may call welfare states, includes Uruguay, Argentina, Chile, Costa Rica, and Brazil. Within this group, average social spending per capita in the 1973–2000 period was around $532, while as a percentage of GDP and as a share of the budget, social spending reached 51.6 and 12.6 percent, respectively. In addition, between approximately 50 and 75 percent of the population is covered by the public health and pension social security system. In contrast, the second group of countries, which we call non-welfare states, has welfare-effort indices that range from 37 to 88. Within this second group, social spending per capita averaged $96.6, while social spending as a percentage of GDP and as a percentage of the budget averaged 5.2 and 34.7 percent, respectively. In terms of the percentage of the population actually covered, the percentage of the active population covered under some social security scheme does not even reach 10 percent.

=== Middle East ===
Saudi Arabia, Kuwait, and the United Arab Emirates are examples of welfare states in the Middle East.

=== Nordic countries ===
The Nordic welfare model refers to the welfare policies of the Nordic countries, which also tie into their labor market policies. The Nordic model of welfare is distinguished from other types of welfare states by its emphasis on maximizing labor force participation, promoting gender equality, egalitarian and extensive benefit levels, the large magnitude of income redistribution and liberal use of the expansionary fiscal policy.

While there are differences among the Nordic countries, they all share a broad commitment to social cohesion, a universal nature of welfare provision in order to safeguard individualism by providing protection for vulnerable individuals and groups in society and maximizing public participation in social decision-making. It is characterized by flexibility and openness to innovation in the provision of welfare. The Nordic welfare systems are mainly funded through taxation.

== Effects ==
=== Effects of welfare on poverty ===
Empirical evidence suggests that taxes and transfers considerably reduce poverty in most Western countries whose welfare states constitute at least a fifth of GDP.

Country	Absolute poverty rate (1960–1991) (threshold set at 40% of U.S. median household income)		Relative poverty rate (1970–1997)	
Country	Pre-welfare	Post-welfare	Pre-welfare	Post-welfare
Sweden	23.7	5.8	14.8	4.8
Norway	9.2	1.7	12.4	4.0
Netherlands	22.1	7.3	18.5	11.5
Finland	11.9	3.7	12.4	3.1
Denmark	26.4	5.9	17.4	4.8
Germany	15.2	4.3	9.7	5.1
Switzerland	12.5	3.8	10.9	9.1
Canada	22.5	6.5	17.1	11.9
France	36.1	9.8	21.8	6.1
Belgium	26.8	6.0	19.5	4.1
Australia	23.3	11.9	16.2	9.2
United Kingdom	16.8	8.7	16.4	8.2
United States	21.0	11.7	17.2	15.1
Italy	30.7	14.3	19.7	9.1

=== Effects of social expenditure on economic growth, public debt and education ===
Researchers have found very little correlation between economic performance and social expenditure. They also see little evidence that social expenditures contribute to losses in productivity; economist Peter Lindert of the University of California, Davis attributes this to policy innovations such as the implementation of "pro-growth" tax policies in real-world welfare states. Social expenses have also not contributed significantly to public debt. Martin Eiermann wrote:

According to the OECD, social expenditures in its 34 member countries rose steadily between 1980 and 2007, but the increase in costs was almost completely offset by GDP growth. More money was spent on welfare because more money circulated in the economy and because government revenues increased. In 1980, the OECD averaged social expenditures equal to 16 percent of GDP. In 2007, just before the financial crisis kicked into full gear, they had risen to 19 percent – a manageable increase.

A Norwegian study covering the period 1980 to 2003 found welfare state spending correlated negatively with student achievement. However, many of the top-ranking OECD countries on the 2009 PISA tests are considered welfare states.

== Criticism and response ==
Early conservatives, under the influence of Thomas Malthus (1766–1834), opposed every form of social insurance "root and branch". Malthus believed that the poor needed to learn the hard way to practice frugality, self-control and chastity. Traditional conservatives also protested that the effect of social insurance would be to weaken private charity and loosen traditional social bonds of family, friends, religious and non-governmental welfare organisations.

Conversely, Karl Marx opposed piecemeal reforms advanced by middle-class reformers out of a sense of duty. In his Address of the Central Committee to the Communist League, written after the failed revolution of 1848, he warned that measures designed to increase wages, improve working conditions and provide social insurance were merely bribes that would temporarily make the situation of working classes tolerable to weaken the revolutionary consciousness that was needed to achieve a socialist economy. (Note: "However, the democratic petty bourgeois want better wages and security for the workers, and hope to achieve this by an extension of state employment and by welfare measures; in short, they hope to bribe the workers with a more or less disguised form of alms and to break their revolutionary strength by temporarily rendering their situation tolerable.") Nevertheless, Marx also proclaimed that the Communists had to support the bourgeoisie wherever it acted as a revolutionary progressive class because "bourgeois liberties had first to be conquered and then criticised".

In the 20th century, opponents of the welfare state have expressed apprehension about the creation of a large, possibly self-interested, bureaucracy required to administer it and the tax burden on the wealthier citizens that this entailed.

Conservative and libertarian groups such as The Heritage Foundation and the Cato Institute argue that welfare creates dependence, a disincentive to work and reduces the opportunity of individuals to manage their own lives. This dependence is called a "culture of poverty", which is said to undermine people from finding meaningful work. Many of these groups also point to the large budget used to maintain these programs and assert that it is wasteful.

In the book Losing Ground, Charles Murray argues that welfare not only increases poverty, but also increases other problems such as single-parent households, and crime.

In 2012, political historian Alan Ryan said that the modern welfare state stops short of being an "advance in the direction of socialism. [...] [I]ts egalitarian elements are more minimal than either its defenders or its critics think". It does not entail advocacy for social ownership of industry. Ryan further wrote:

The modern welfare state, does not set out to make the poor richer and the rich poorer, which is a central element in socialism, but to help people to provide for themselves in sickness while they enjoy good health, to put money aside to cover unemployment while they are in work, and to have adults provide for the education of their own and other people's children, expecting those children's future taxes to pay in due course for the pensions of their parents' generation. These are devices for shifting income across different stages in life, not for shifting income across classes. Another distinct difference is that social insurance does not aim to transform work and working relations; employers and employees pay taxes at a level they would not have done in the nineteenth century, but owners are not expropriated, profits are not illegitimate, cooperativism does not replace hierarchical management.

In 2017, historian Walter Scheidel argued that the establishment of welfare states in the West in the early 20th century could be partly a reaction by elites to the Bolshevik Revolution and its violence against the bourgeoisie, which feared violent revolution in its own backyard. They were diminished decades later as the perceived threat receded. Scheidel spoke to Vice's Matt Taylor in an interview:

It's a little tricky because the US never really had any strong leftist movement. But if you look at Europe, after 1917 people were really scared about communism in all the Western European countries. You have all these poor people, they might rise up and kill us and take our stuff. That wasn't just a fantasy because it was happening next door. And that, we can show, did trigger steps in the direction of having more welfare programs and a rudimentary safety net in response to fear of communism. Not that they [the communists] would invade, but that there would be homegrown movements of this sort. American populism is a little different because it's more detached from that. But it happens roughly at the same time, and people in America are worried about communism, too – not necessarily very reasonably. But that was always in the background. And people have only begun to study systematically to what extent the threat, real or imagined, of this type of radical regime really influenced policy changes in Western democracies. You don't necessarily even have to go out and kill rich people – if there was some plausible alternative out there, it would arguably have an impact on policy making at home. That's certainly there in the 20s, 30s, 40s, 50s, and 60s. And there's a debate, right, because it becomes clear that the Soviet Union is really not in very good shape, and people don't really like to be there, and all these movements lost their appeal. That's a contributing factor, arguably, that the end of the Cold War coincides roughly with the time when inequality really starts going up again, because elites are much more relaxed about the possibility of credible alternatives or threats being out there.

=== The welfare queen ===
Some argue that the public opinion on welfare in the US is in part a product of racist and classist political and ideological campaigns. The popular concept of the welfare queen, a person taking advantage of the welfare system, came to be as a result of such effort.

The first version of the welfare queen was a lazy and selfish woman, living off of state benefits and having many children to obtain as much financial support as possible. In another case, it was a man buying T-bone steaks with food stamps, while the rest of the country struggled to put food on the table. While never stated directly, it was presumed by the public that both characters were, of course, black people, who were lazily exploiting the system and lived lavishly, while the regular hard-working middle-class American, imagined by the public to be white, had to foot the bill.

In "The Welfare Queen: Race, Gender, Class, and Public Opinion", Carly Hayden Foster analyzes Martin Gilens' writing in "Why Americans Hate Welfare" and argues that race interacts with gender and class. These aspects together are then key determinants in whether or not there is public support for welfare. According to her analysis, survey respondents are more likely to support welfare spending if the mother reliant on welfare is described as white, while a black welfare mother fares significantly less support. It is argued that this is in part because of the idea that the black mother would then have an incentive to have more black babies, but is in general interrelated with the perceived reproductive behavior of the mother, which in this case is affected by the enduring Jezebel stereotype that presents black women as inherently sexually promiscuous. Similarly, public support of welfare is unlikely in the case of poor single mothers.

=== Welfare fraud ===
The widespread assumption that some or many welfare recipients are fraudulent apparently guides public opinion. In "The Crime of Survival" Jullily Kohler-Hausmann defends the position that anti-fraud campaigns as it relates to welfare worsen public perception of welfare recipients and frame them as criminals. He goes on to cite Martin Gilens who in "Why Americans Hate Welfare" argues:

[A] large majority of Americans agree that government should provide monetary support to those who are unable to support themselves. But the perception of welfare abuse is widespread. Indeed, as the survey evidence … suggests, it would be hard to exaggerate the level of cynicism toward welfare recipients held by the American public. This perception of welfare recipients' dishonesty and freeloading is at the core of Americans' conviction that welfare spending should be cut.

This sentiment was perpetrated by the Reagan administration and he himself addressed the supposed fraud in public programs in his first inaugural address. During his presidency, welfare spending tightened and the anti-fraud rhetoric was used to justify big cuts to welfare programs. Regarding this period, Martin Gilens cites Julius Wilson, who writes:

As the economic situation worsened, Ronald Reagan was able to convince many working- and middle-class Americans that the decline in their living standards was attributable to expensive programs for the poor…

Martin Gilens argues that economic circumstance is a deciding factor in the public opinion on welfare. He says that during the period of growing economy, people are willing to share their profits with the less fortunate, but this generosity disappears in times of economic turmoil, as people are primarily preoccupied with their own well-being and are less willing to provide for the poor because their own situation takes precedence.

He cites Michael Katz, who claims that the stagflation following the 1973 energy crisis caused the public opinion to shift toward a negative attitude toward the expansion of the social welfare state, as people who worried for their financial future were in search of a scape-goat for their economic losses, in this case welfare recipients.

=== Predistribution versus redistribution ===
Bauwens, Kostakis and Pazaitis argue that a redistributionist welfare state is insufficient and propose a "partner state" that would enable and empower the direct creation of value by civil society. In their account, this entails a shift towards the predistribution of resources rather than relying only on redistribution after the fact, with the state creating and sustaining infrastructures for commons-based peer production. They present the partner state not as an alternative opposed to the welfare state, but as a model that would "transcend and include" it, retaining its solidarity functions while de-bureaucratizing public services through their commonification and through public-commons partnerships.

== See also ==
- Constitutional economics
- Corporate welfare
- Economic security
- Flexicurity
- Free rider problem
- Happiness economics
- Hidden welfare state
- Involuntary unemployment
- Guaranteed minimum income
- Nanny state
- Social policy
- Social protection
- Social stratification
- State Socialism (Germany)
- Welfare capitalism
- Welfare economics
- Welfare reform
- Welfare state in the United Kingdom

Models

- European social model
- Nordic model
- Social programs in the United States
- Third Way

Transfer of wealth

- Cloward–Piven strategy
- Transfer payment

Housing

- Council house
- Housing estate
- Public housing
- Subsidized housing
