= Manfred G. Schmidt =

- Born: 1948 (age 76–77); Donauwörth, Germany
- Occupation: Professor

Manfred G. Schmidt (born 1948) is a German political scientist. He is professor of political science at the Faculty of Economic and Social Sciences of the University of Heidelberg.

== Early life and education ==
Manfred G. Schmidt was born in 1948 in Donauwörth, Germany. After studying political science and English studies, he received his PhD in political science from the University of Tübingen, directed by Gerhard Lehmbruch. He received his postdoctoral degree (Habilitation) from the University of Konstanz in 1981.

== Career ==
In 1982, he was appointed professor of political science at the Free University of Berlin. In 1987, he became professor of political science at the University of Heidelberg. After conducting research at the Center for Social Policy Studies, University of Bremen, from 1997, he returned to a professorship at the University of Heidelberg in 2001. He was the director of the Institute of Political Science at the University of Heidelberg from that time until 2006. Since 2006/07, Schmidt has been dean of the Faculty of Economic and Social Sciences of the University of Heidelberg.

In 1981, he was awarded the Stein Rokkan Prize. In 1995, he received the Leibniz Prize of the German Research Council (DFG). In 1999, a survey of the German Research Council among political scientists ranked him as the third most important political scientist in Germany, and as the most important researcher in comparative politics in Germany. He was elected as a member of the Heidelberg Academy of Sciences in 2002 and as a member of the Berlin-Brandenburg Academy of Sciences and Humanities one year later.

His research focuses on political institutions in Germany, social policies in comparative perspectives and theories of democracy.

== Books/edited volumes (selection) ==
- Das politische System der Bundesrepublik Deutschland, Munich: C.H. Beck 2005.
- Der Wohlfahrtsstaat. Eine Einführung in den historischen und internationalen Vergleich, Wiesbaden: VS Verlag für Sozialwissenschaften.
- Political Institutions in the Federal Republic of Germany, Oxford: Oxford University Press, 2003.
- Regieren in der Bundesrepublik Deutschland. Innen- und Außenpolitik seit 1949, Wiesbaden: VS Verlag für Sozialwissenschaften 2006 (co-editor Reimut Zohlnhöfer).

== Articles ==
- Schmidt, Manfred G. (2007), "Testing the retrenchment hypothesis: educational spending, 1960-2002", in Castles, Francis G. (ed.), The disappearing state? retrenchment realities in an age of globalisation, Cheltenham, UK Northampton, Massachusetts: Edward Elgar, pp. 159–183, ISBN 9781283219075.
- Schmidt, Manfred G. (December 2006). "Die zukunft der demokratie". Zeitschrift für Parlamentsfragen. 37 (4): 812–822. doi:10.1007/s11619-006-0080-y. JSTOR 24236856. S2CID 145682310.
- Schmidt, Manfred G. (2006). "Demokratische und autokratische Regimeeffekte in Deutschlands Sozialpolitik". Zeitschrift für Sozialreform. 52 (2): 149–164. doi:10.1515/zsr-2006-0203. ISSN 0514-2776. OCLC 190812775. S2CID 183312979.
- Schmidt, Manfred G. (2005), "Alexis de Tocqueville (1805–1859)", in Bleek, Wilhelm; Lietzmann, Hans J. (eds.), Klassiker der Politikwissenschaft: von Aristoteles bis David Easton, München, Germany: C.H. Beck, pp. 95–108, ISBN 9783406527944. Preview.
- Schmidt, Manfred G. (April 2004). "Die öffentlichen und privaten Bildungsausgaben Deutschlands im internationalen Vergleich". Journal for Comparative Government and European Policy (Zeitschrift für Staats- und Europawissenschaften). 2 (1): 7–31. doi:10.1515/zfse.2.1.7. JSTOR 24237103.
- Schmidt, Manfred G. (2003), "Germany: the grand coalition state", in Colomer, Josep M. (ed.), Political institutions in Europe (2nd ed.), London New York: Routledge, pp. 55–93, ISBN 9780203346518.
- Schmidt, Manfred G. (2002), "The impact of political parties, constitutional structures and veto players on public policy", in Keman, Hans (ed.), Comparative democratic politics a guide to contemporary theory and research, London Thousand Oaks, California: SAGE, pp. 166–184, ISBN 9781446217528.
- Schmidt, Manfred G. (January 2002). "Political performance and types of democracy: findings from comparative studies". European Journal of Political Research. 41 (1): 147–163. doi:10.1111/1475-6765.00007.
- Schmidt, Manfred G. (December 2001). "Still on the middle way? Germany's political economy at the beginning of the twenty-first century". German Politics. 10 (3): 1–12. doi:10.1080/0964-4008.2001.10076422a. S2CID 154416489.
- Schmidt, Manfred G. (December 1999). "On the political productivity of democracies". Scandinavian Political Studies. 22 (4): 281–294. doi:10.1111/1467-9477.00019. Full text.
- Schmidt, Manfred G. (1997). "Determinants of social expenditure in liberal democracies: the post World War II experience". Acta Politica. 32 (2). Palgrave Macmillan: 153–173.
- Schmidt, Manfred G.; Keman, Hans (February 1997). "Social policy in rich and poor countries". European Journal of Political Research. 31 (1–2): 159–168. doi:10.1111/j.1475-6765.1997.tb00771.x.
- Schmidt, Manfred G.; Lijphart, Arend (February 1997). "Dimensions of democracies". European Journal of Political Research. 31 (1–2): 193–204. doi:10.1111/j.1475-6765.1997.tb00774.x. S2CID 189868723.
- Schmidt, Manfred G. (September 1996). "When parties matter: a review of the possibilities and limits of partisan influence on public policy". European Journal of Political Research. 30 (2): 155–183. doi:10.1111/j.1475-6765.1996.tb00673.x.
- Schmidt, Manfred G. (December 1995). "The parties-do-matter hypothesis and the case of the federal republic of Germany". German Politics. 4 (3): 1–21. doi:10.1080/09644009508404411.
- Schmidt, Manfred G. (October 1992). "Political consequences of German unification". West European Politics. 15 (4): 1–15. doi:10.1080/01402389208424929.
