= Ingrid van Biezen =

Dutch political scientist

- Born: 1969 (age 56–57)
- Education: Leiden University
- Occupations: Professor of comparative politics, Leiden University

Ingrid van Biezen (born 1969) is Professor of Comparative Politics at Leiden University, and the editor of the political science journal Acta Politica.

Her research interests include comparative European politics, political parties and party systems in Europe, democratisation, Southern Europe, and post-communist politics.

== Education ==
Ingrid van Biezen studied for her masters and her PhD at Leiden University.

== Career ==
From 2000 to 2009 she was based in the Department of Political Science and International Studies at the University of Birmingham.

She is currently directing a large comparative research project (Re-conceptualizing democracy) on political parties and democracy through a focus on party law. The project is funded by the European Research Council.

== Bibliography ==
=== Books ===
- van Biezen, Ingrid (2003). Financing political parties and election campaigns : guidelines. Strasbourg: Council of Europe Pub. ISBN 9789287153562.
- van Biezen, Ingrid (2003). Political parties in new democracies party organization in Southern and East-Central Europe. Basingstoke New York: Palgrave Macmillan. ISBN 9781403903075.

=== Journal articles ===
- van Biezen, Ingrid (1998). "Building party organisations and the relevance of past models: The communist and socialist parties in Spain and Portugal". West European Politics. 21 (2): 32–62. doi:10.1080/01402389808425244.
- van Biezen, Ingrid (2003). "The place of parties in contemporary democracies". West European Politics. 26 (3): 171–184. doi:10.1080/01402380312331280648.
- van Biezen, Ingrid; Molenaar, Fransje (2012). "The Europeanisation of party politics? Competing regulatory paradigms at the supranational level". West European Politics. 35 (3): 632–656. doi:10.1080/01402382.2012.665744. S2CID 154698799.
- van Biezen, Ingrid; Mair, Peter; Poguntke, Thomas (January 2012). "Going, going, ... gone? The decline of party membership in contemporary Europe". European Journal of Political Research. 51 (1): 24–56. doi:10.1111/j.1475-6765.2011.01995.x.
- van Biezen, Ingrid; Borz, Gabriela (November 2012). "Models of party democracy: patterns of party regulation in post-war European constitutions" (PDF). European Political Science Review. 4 (3): 327–359. doi:10.1017/S1755773911000294. S2CID 53063224.
- van Biezen, Ingrid; Helen, Wallace (July 2013). "Old and new oppositions in contemporary Europe". Government and Opposition. 48 (3): 289–313. doi:10.1017/gov.2013.11.
- Poguntke, Thomas, Susan E. Scarrow, Paul D. Webb, Elin H. Allern, Nicholas Aylott, Ingrid Van Biezen, Enrico Calossi et al. "Party rules, party resources and the politics of parliamentary democracies: How parties organize in the 21st century." Party politics 22, no. 6 (2016): 661-678.
