= Peer C. Fiss =

Management and organization scholar

- Peer C. Fiss
- Occupations: Professor of Management & Organizations, and Sociology

Academic background
- Education: Northwestern University (PhD)

Academic work
- Discipline: Management and sociology
- Sub-discipline: Organization theory Strategic management Qualitative comparative analysis
- Institutions: University of Southern California; Queen's University

Peer C. Fiss is a management and organization scholar at the University of Southern California (USC). He is the Jill and Frank Fertitta Chair in Business Administration and a professor of management and organization with a courtesy appointment in sociology at the USC Marshall School of Business.

Fiss earned a joint doctorate in management and organizations and sociology from Northwestern University in 2003. From 2003 to 2006, he was an assistant professor of strategy and organization at the Smith School of Business at Queen's University in Canada.

== Work ==
Fiss's academic research examines how meaning, framing, and categorization shape organizational action and strategic change. A methodological strand of his work concerns configurational theory and the study of causal complexity through set-theoretic methods, particularly qualitative comparative analysis (QCA).

His work on QCA addresses organizational configurations and typologies, configurational theory development, methodological guidance for using QCA, and applications in organization studies, strategy, and information systems.

A 2022 bibliometric review of 1,155 business and management articles using complexity theory or fuzzy-set QCA identified Fiss's 2011 article “Building Better Causal Theories” as the most-cited article in its review corpus. The review also ranked Fiss first among authors by total citations within that dataset. A separate Web of Science bibliometric study of person-centered methodologies identified Fiss among the most-cited QCA authors. Another Web of Science analysis, covering 5,825 publications concerning management theory, listed “Building Better Causal Theories” among the field's most-cited works.

His research has been published in journals including the Academy of Management Journal, Academy of Management Review, Administrative Science Quarterly, American Sociological Review, MIS Quarterly, Organization Science, and Strategic Management Journal.

In 2026, Fiss and Charles C. Ragin received the Organization and Management Theory Division's Joanne Martin Trailblazer Award for their work advancing set-analytic methods and qualitative comparative analysis in organization and management research. The biennial award recognizes scholars whose work has opened new lines of thinking or inquiry in organization and management theory.

In 2023, Strategic Organization gave its Best SO!apbox Essay Award to “Studying Configurations with Qualitative Comparative Analysis,” written by Thomas Greckhamer, Santi Furnari, Fiss, and Ruth V. Aguilera.

== Selected works ==
- Campbell, Joanna T.; Fiss, Peer C. (2026). "Tackling the Complexity Challenge: When and How to Engage in Configurational and Hybrid Theorizing". Academy of Management Review. doi:10.5465/amr.2024.0187.
- Park, YoungKi; Fiss, Peer C.; El Sawy, Omar A. (2020). "Theorizing the Multiplicity of Digital Phenomena: The Ecology of Configurations, Causal Recipes, and Guidelines for Applying QCA". MIS Quarterly. 44 (4): 1493–1520. doi:10.25300/MISQ/2020/13879.
- Greckhamer, Thomas; Furnari, Santi; Fiss, Peer C.; Aguilera, Ruth V. (2018). "Studying Configurations with Qualitative Comparative Analysis: Best Practices in Strategy and Organization Research". Strategic Organization. 16 (4): 482–495. doi:10.1177/1476127018786487.
- Ragin, Charles C.; Fiss, Peer C. (2017). Intersectional Inequality: Race, Class, Test Scores, and Poverty. Chicago: University of Chicago Press.
- Fiss, Peer C.; Cambré, Bart; Marx, Axel, eds. (2013). Configurational Theory and Methods in Organizational Research. Bingley: Emerald.
- Fiss, Peer C. (2011). "Building Better Causal Theories: A Fuzzy Set Approach to Typologies in Organization Research". Academy of Management Journal. 54 (2): 393–420. doi:10.5465/amj.2011.60263120.
- Fiss, Peer C. (2007). "A Set-Theoretic Approach to Organizational Configurations". Academy of Management Review. 32 (4): 1180–1198. doi:10.5465/amr.2007.26586092.
- Fiss, Peer C.; Hirsch, Paul M. (2005). "The Discourse of Globalization: Framing and Sensemaking of an Emerging Concept". American Sociological Review. 70 (1): 29–52. doi:10.1177/000312240507000103.
