= Peter Mair =

Irish political scientist (1951–2011)

Peter Mair (3 March 1951 – 15 August 2011) was an Irish political scientist. He was a professor of comparative politics at the European University Institute in Florence.

== Career ==
Peter Mair was born in Rosses Point, County Sligo, Ireland, and studied history and politics at University College Dublin. He continued to work as assistant professor at the University of Limerick, Strathclyde, Manchester and the European University Institute in Florence during the 1980s. In 1987 at Leiden University he gained a doctorate, which as The changing Irish party system became a standard work on the Irish party system. In 1990, he co-authored the book Identity, Competition and Electoral Availability with Stefano Bartolini. It was awarded the ISSC/Unesco Stein Rokkan Prize for Comparative Social Science Research. He continued to work at Leiden University becoming professor of comparative politics in 1994 when he held an inaugural address entitled "Party democracies and their difficulties". In 2001 he became co-editor of the journal West European Politics. In 2005 he returned to the European University Institute to invest time in his research into democracy, indifference and populist parties.

He specialized in comparative politics and specifically in the study of parties and party systems and their decline in membership following WW2. This decline in civic participation is described more generally by Robert D. Putnam in the book Bowling Alone.

Mair died suddenly while on holiday in Connemara with his family.

== Publications ==
=== Books ===
- Mair, Peter; Bartolini, Stefano (1990). Identity, Competition, and Electoral Availability: the stabilisation of European electorates 1885–1985, Cambridge University Press, Cambridge.
- Mair, Peter (1997). Party System Change: approaches and interpretations, Oxford University Press, Oxford.
- Mair, Peter; Zielonka, Jan (2002). The Enlarged European Union: Diversity and Adaptation, Frank Cass, London.
- Mair, Peter (2004). Political Parties and Electoral Change: Party Responses to Electoral Markets, Müller WC, Plasser F (eds.), Sage, London.
- Mair, Peter; Gallagher, Michael; Laver, Michael (2005). Representative Government in Modern Europe: Institutions, Parties, and Governments, McGraw-Hill, New York, 4th edition.
- Mair, Peter; Kopecky, Petr; Spirova, Maria (2012). Party Patronage and Party Government in European Democracies, Oxford University Press, Oxford.
- Mair, Peter (2013). Ruling The Void: The Hollowing Of Western Democracy, Verso Books, New York and London.

=== Journal articles ===
- Laver, Michael; Mair, Peter (1999). "Party Policy and cabinet portfolios in the Netherlands 1998: Results from an expert survey". Acta Politica. 34: 49–64.
- Mair, Peter (2007). "Political Opposition and the European Union". Government and Opposition. 42 (1): 1–17. doi:10.1111/j.1477-7053.2007.00209.x.
- Mair, Peter; van Biezen, Ingrid; Poguntke, Thomas (January 2012). "Going, going, ... gone? The decline of party membership in contemporary Europe". European Journal of Political Research. 51 (1): 24–56. doi:10.1111/j.1475-6765.2011.01995.x.
