= Rafaela Dancygier =

American political scientist

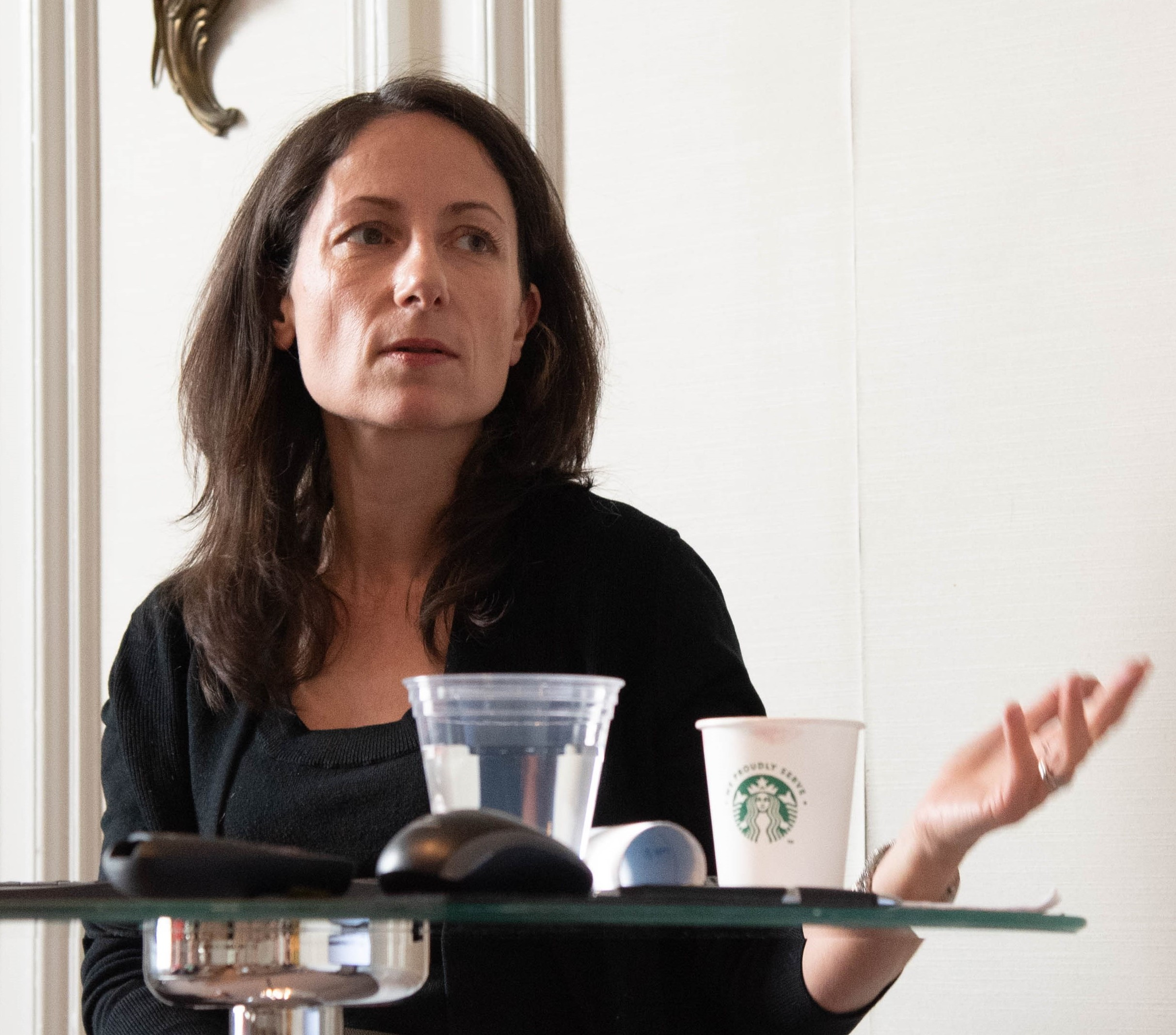
- Dancygier in 2019
- Born: 1977 (age 48–49)
- Occupation: Political scientist

Rafaela M. Dancygier (born 1977) is an American political scientist who is the IBM Chair in International Studies at Princeton University. She specializes in comparative politics, with a focus on the implications of ethnic diversity in democracies.

== Early life and education ==
Dancygier was born in 1977. She obtained a B.A. in Political Science and International Relations from Brown University and an M.Phil. and Ph.D. in Political Science from Yale University.

== Career ==
After an assistant professorship at Princeton University, Dancygier took up the posts of associate professor and full professor. She currently holds the IBM Chair in International Studies at Princeton. In 2023, she was elected to the American Academy of Arts and Sciences.

Dancygier’s research focuses on the domestic consequences of international immigration in Europe. Her first book, Immigration and Conflict in Europe, was published in 2010 by Cambridge University Press.

== Publications ==
=== Books ===
- Dancygier, Rafaela M. (2010). Immigration and Conflict in Europe. Cambridge Studies in Comparative Politics. Cambridge: Cambridge University Press. ISBN 978-0-521-19907-0.
- Dancygier, Rafaela M. (2017). Dilemmas of Inclusion: Muslims in European Politics. Princeton; Oxford: Princeton University Press. ISBN 978-0-691-17259-0.

=== Chapters ===
- Dancygier, Rafaela; Walter, Stefanie (2015-04-23). "5. Globalization, Labor Market Risks, and Class Cleavages". In Beramendi, Pablo; Häusermann, Silja; Kitschelt, Herbert; Kriesi, Hanspeter (eds.). The Politics of Advanced Capitalism. Cambridge University Press. ISBN 978-1-316-30075-6.

=== Articles ===
- Dancygier, Rafaela; Saunders, Elizabeth N. (2006). "A New Electorate? Comparing Preferences and Partisanship between Immigrants and Natives". American Journal of Political Science. 50 (4): 962–981. doi:10.1111/j.1540-5907.2006.00227.x. ISSN 1540-5907.
- Dancygier, Rafaela M.; Donnelly, Michael J. (January 2013). "Sectoral Economies, Economic Contexts, and Attitudes toward Immigration". The Journal of Politics. 75 (1): 17–35. doi:10.1017/S0022381612000849. ISSN 0022-3816. PMC 3867934. PMID 24363457.
- Dancygier, Rafaela M.; Laitin, David D. (2014-05-11). "Immigration into Europe: Economic Discrimination, Violence, and Public Policy". Annual Review of Political Science. 17: 43–64. doi:10.1146/annurev-polisci-082012-115925. ISSN 1094-2939.
- Dancygier, Rafaela M. (April 2014). "Electoral Rules or Electoral Leverage? Explaining Muslim Representation in England". World Politics. 66 (2): 229–263. doi:10.1017/S0043887114000021. ISSN 0043-8871.
- Dancygier, Rafaela M.; Lindgren, Karl-Oskar; Oskarsson, Sven; Vernby, Kåre (November 2015). "Why Are Immigrants Underrepresented in Politics? Evidence from Sweden". American Political Science Review. 109 (4): 703–724. doi:10.1017/S0003055415000404. ISSN 0003-0554.
- Dancygier, Rafaela; Margalit, Yotam (2020-04-01). "The Evolution of the Immigration Debate: Evidence from a New Dataset of Party Positions Over the Last Half-Century". Comparative Political Studies. 53 (5): 734–774. doi:10.1177/0010414019858936. ISSN 0010-4140.
- Chou, Winston; Dancygier, Rafaela; Egami, Naoki; Jamal, Amaney A. (2021-10-01). "Competing for Loyalists? How Party Positioning Affects Populist Radical Right Voting". Comparative Political Studies. 54 (12): 2226–2260. doi:10.1177/0010414021997166. ISSN 0010-4140.
- Dancygier, Rafaela; Wiedemann, Andreas (2024). "The financialization of housing and its political consequences". American Journal of Political Science ajps.12928. doi:10.1111/ajps.12928. ISSN 1540-5907.

== Awards ==
- Best Book Award, European Politics and Society Section, American Political Science Association (APSA)
- 2018 Stein Rokkan Prize for Comparative Social Science Research, European Consortium for Political Research (ECPR), for Dilemmas of Inclusion
