= Dave Sinardet =

Belgian political scientist

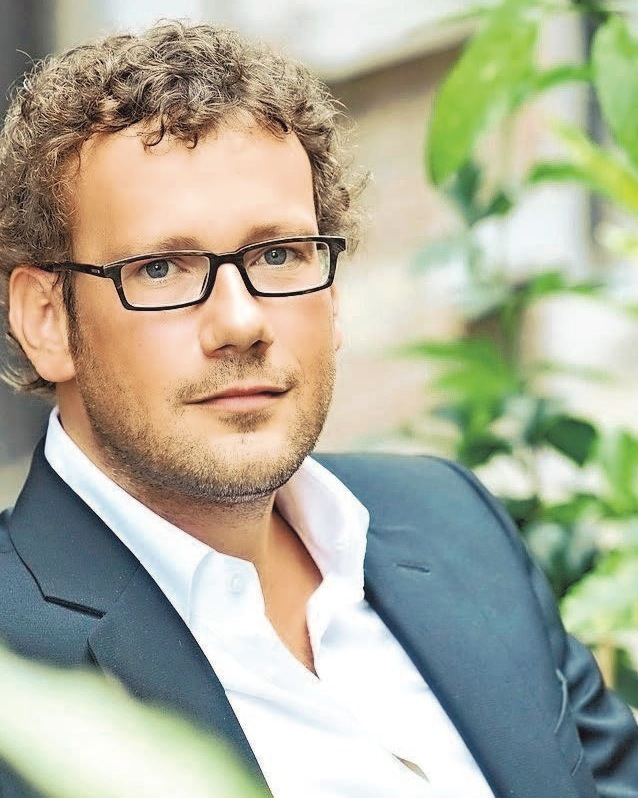
Dave Sinardet

Dave Sinardet (Antwerp, 6 October 1975) is a Belgian political scientist, author and columnist.

== Biography ==
Since 2007, Dave Sinardet is a professor at Saint-Louis University, Brussels. In 2009, he also started giving lectures at the Vrije Universiteit Brussel. At the University of Antwerp he is a post-doctoral research fellow of the FWO (National Fund for Scientific Research).

He is also an op-ed columnist for several Belgian papers, amongst them the Dutch-speaking newspapers De Standaard, De Tijd, and the French-speaking newspaper Le Soir.

== Research themes ==
Dave Sinardet's research concentrates on comparative federalism, nationalism, language politics, consociational democracy, multi-level politics, public sphere and political communication. His PhD thesis dealt with the role of media in the representation of Belgium's political language conflict and more generally with the question of how a public sphere functions in a federal multilingual country such as Belgium.

He has published in political science journals such as West European Politics, Acta Politica or "International Journal of Political Science", Regional and Federal Studies and Governance.

He is also an active participant in the Belgian public debate on federalism and nationalism in both French and Dutch languages. He is also regularly interviewed by international media on Belgian politics.

He is a member of the Pavia group, a Belgian academic think tank which promotes a federal electoral district for Belgium, so that inhabitants could vote for the same parties, Flemish and French. Sinardet is also in favour of an EU-wide electoral district for the election of part of the members of the European Parliament, as a way to reduce the EU’s democratic deficit’.

== Publications ==
- A touch of crisis. The long and winding road to the sixth Belgian state reform, in: Belgian Society and Politics, Annual Review 2008-2009.
- Belgian Federalism Put to the Test: The 2007 Belgian Federal Elections and their Aftermath, in: West-European Politics, 2008.
- (with Marc Hooghe) Is there a Belgian public opinion? Introduction, in: Dave Sinardet & Marc Hooghe (red.), Public opinion in a multilingual society: institutional design and federal loyalty, Brussels, 2009.
- Flemish parties in a consociational federal context: falling for the temptation of majoritarianism? The case of Brussels-Halle-Vilvoorde, in: Carl Devos & David Hanley (red.), Flemish parties between region, federation and Europe, Brussels, 2009.
- Direct democracy as a tool to shape a united public opinion in a multilingual society? Some reflections based on the Belgian case, in: Dave Sinardet & Marc Hooghe (red.), Public opinion in a multilingual society: institutional design and federal loyalty, Brussels, 2009.
- (with Caroline Van Wynsberghe, Johanne Poirier & François Tulkens) The political and institutional development of the Brussels Metropolitan Zone: observations and prospects, in: Brussels studies, 2009.
- From consociational consciousness to majoritarian myth. Consociationalism, multi-level politics and the Belgian case of Brussels-Halle-Vilvoorde, in: Acta Politica, v. 45, no. 3, pp. 346–369 September 2010.
- Institutional reform in Belgium: an analysis of the political dynamics behind the Lambermont state reform of 2001, Hagen, Fern Universität, 2010
- Multilingual democracy and public sphere. What Belgium and the EU can learn from each other, in: Axel Gosseries & Yannick Vanderborght (ed.), Arguing about justice. Essays for Philippe Van Parijs, Louvain-La-Neuve, Presses Universitaires de Louvain, 2011.
- Federal Reform and Party Politics. The case of the Fifth Belgian State Reform, in: Arthur Benz & Felix Knuepling, Changing Federal Constitutions: Lessons from International Comparison, Barbara Budrich Publishers, 2012.
- Is there a Belgian public sphere? What the case of a federal multilingual country can contribute to the debate on transnational public spheres. And vice versa, in: Michel Seymour & Alain-G. Gagnon (ed.), Multinational Federalism: Problems and Prospects, New-York: Palgrave MacMillan, 2012.
- (with Carl Devos) Governing without a Government: The Belgian experiment, in: Governance. An International Journal of Policy, Administrations and Institutions, 2012.
- How Linguistically Divided Media Represent Linguistically Divisive Issues. Belgian Political TV-Debates on Brussels-Halle-Vilvoorde, in: Regional and Federal Studies (Special issue on ‘The Future of Belgian Federalism’), 2013.
- (with Peter Bursens) Democratic legitimacy in multilevel political systems. The role of politicization at the polity-wide level in the EU and Belgium, in: Acta Politica, v. 49, no. 3, pp. 246–265 July 2014.
- (with Jeremy Dodeigne & Min Reuchamps) Beyond the Myth of Unanimity. Opinions of Belgian MPs on Federalism and the Sixth Reform of the Belgian State, in: Belgian Society and Politics. As Ever, in Between Elections, 2014.
