= Ragin =

Ragin may refer to:

- Charles C. Ragin, American sociologist and Professor of Sociology and Political Science at the University of Arizona
- Derek Lee Ragin (born 1958), American countertenor
- Hugh Ragin, American jazz trumpeter
- Wah Wah Watson (Melvin M. Ragin, born c. 1951), American guitarist
