= Democratic backsliding in Europe by country =

This article discusses instances of democratic backsliding by country in Europe. Democratic backsliding is the process of a country losing democratic qualities over time.

== Albania ==
The Democratic Party of Albania has long accused the government led by the Socialist Party of Albania of state capture. The Centrist Democrat International – of which the Democratic Party is a member – has raised concerns regarding the subversion of electoral processes, politically motivated criminal prosecution, and the alleged influence of organised crime in the government. There have been several arrests with allegations of corruption and ties to organized crime, involving, amongst others, former president Ilir Meta; Erion Veliaj; and former Socialist Party MP Jurgis Çyrbja. Academics disagree regarding whether Albania is experiencing democratic backsliding. One research article cites a decline in 4 of the 5 core V-Dem Democracy Indices compared to the last government not led by Edi Rama, the current prime minister.

In the 2020s, government actions raised press freedom concerns. In 2025, Albania imposed a one-year ban on TikTok, citing risks of youth violence, with critics describing it as an attempt to restrict online discourse and limit free expression. The decision follows a broader pattern of government pressure on independent media and journalists facing intimidation.

== Bosnia and Herzegovina ==
The former President of Republika Srpska, Alliance of Independent Social Democrats leader Milorad Dodik, has been accused of backsliding by the International Press Institute through his support for new defamation laws, foreign agent registration laws and restrictions on media registration as NGOs.

== Czech Republic ==
The premiership of ANO 2011 leader Andrej Babiš from 2017 to 2021 has been described by analysts Sean Hanley and Milada Anna Vachudova as a period of democratic backsliding, albeit to a less drastic degree than Poland or Hungary. However, other academics such as Elisabeth Bakke and Nick Sitter have disputed this, describing it as "conceptual stretching" and claiming that "exceptional factors" that existed in Hungary and Poland are not applicable to the Czech Republic.

== Georgia ==
Democratic backsliding in Georgia has occurred after initial phases of democratisation, following the 2003 Rose Revolution, while Mikheil Saakashvili was president, and following the 2012 Georgian parliamentary election, when Bidzina Ivanishvili and Georgian Dream (GD) came to power. Democratic backsliding during the GD period includes the systematic weakening of electoral competition and checks on power following the pattern of competitive authoritarian regimes, in particular starting with the 2023 proposal of a foreign agent law. By late 2025, democratic backsliding characteristics included, as summarised by the European Commissioner for Enlargement, the "rapid erosion of the rule of law and severe restrictions on fundamental rights ... [including] legislation severely limiting civic space, undermining freedom of expression and assembly, and violating the principle of non-discrimination".

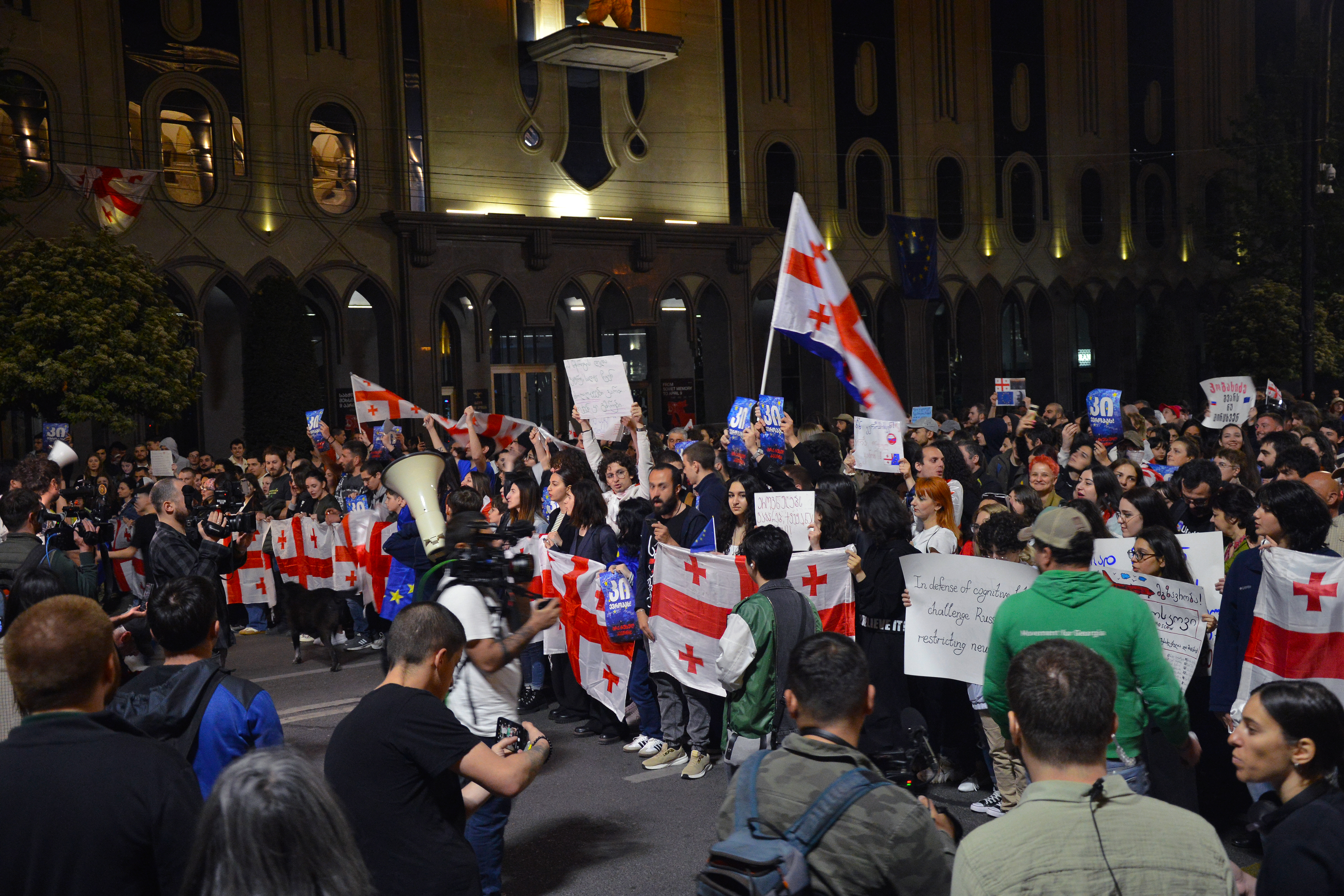
2024–2025 Georgian protests

== Hungary ==
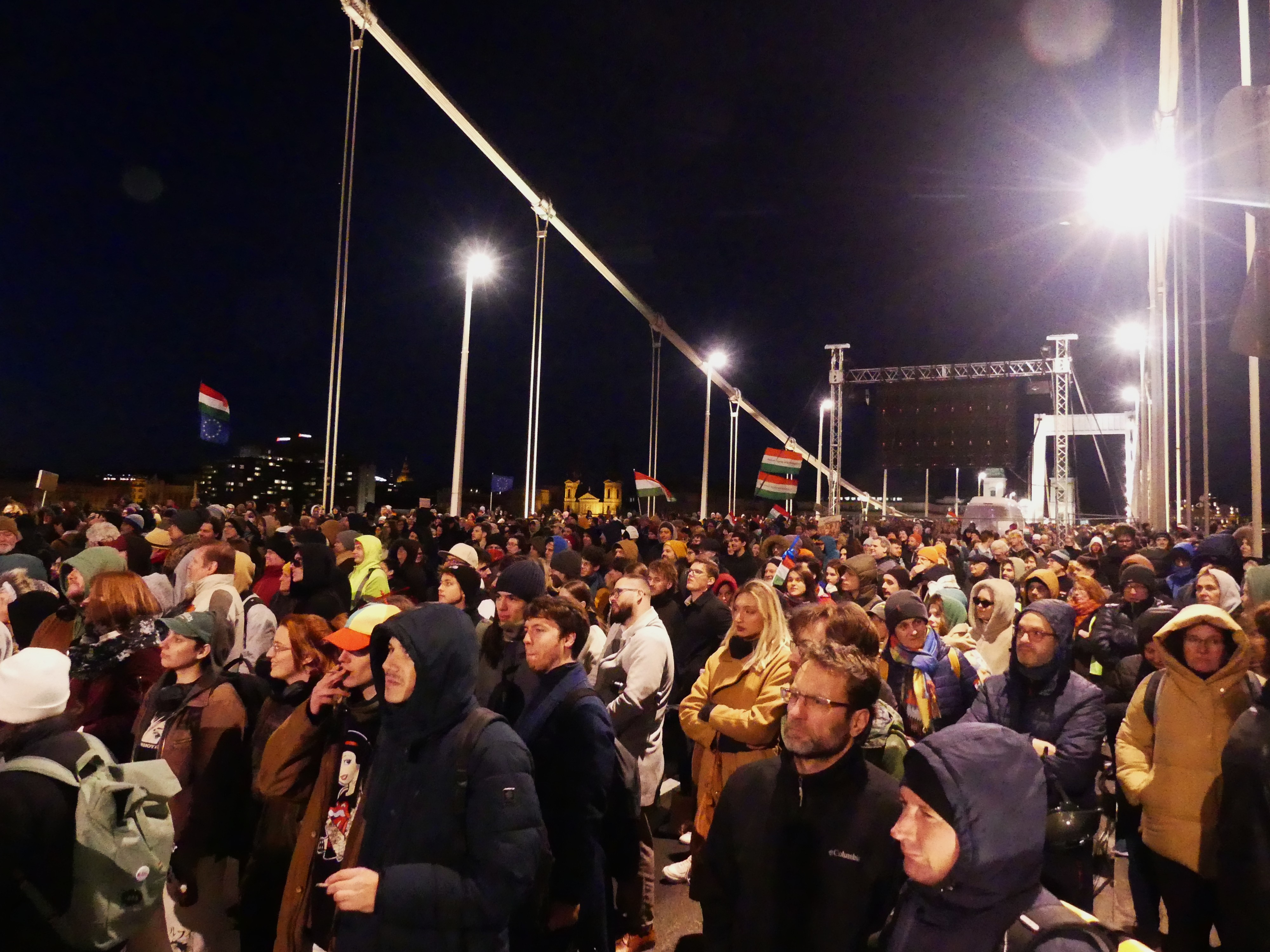
Anti-government demonstration in Budapest, Hungary, 2025

Since 2010, Hungary under Viktor Orbán and his far-right Fidesz party has been described as a prominent example of democratic backsliding in Europe. As in Poland, political interference by the legislative and executive branches of government threatens the institutional independence of the judiciary. In 2012, the legislature abruptly lowered the age of retirement for judges from 70 to 62, forcing 57 court leaders (including the President of the Supreme Court) to retire. After the Court of Justice of the European Union ruled that this decision violated EU laws relating to equality in the employment context, the government repealed the law and compensated the judges, but did not reinstate those forced to retire. The 2012 judiciary reform also centralized administration of the courts under the newly established National Judiciary Office, then headed by Tünde Handó, a lawyer married to a prominent member of the Fidesz government. Under Handó, the NJO also weakened the institutions of judicial self-governance, provoking what the European Association of Judges, Amnesty International, and the Hungarian Helsinki Committee describe as a "constitutional crisis" within the Hungarian judiciary. Hungarian judges interviewed by Amnesty International also expressed concerns about attacks on the judiciary and individual judges by politicians and in the media. The Hungarian government has dismissed criticism of its record on democracy issues.

Historical V-Dem Democracy Indices for electoral democracy (solid) and liberal democracy (dotted) for Hungary

According to the 2020 report of the V-Dem Institute at the University of Gothenburg, Hungary had by 2019 become the first-ever EU member state to become an authoritarian regime. On Freedom House's annual report, Hungary's democracy rating dropped for ten consecutive years. Its classification was downgraded from "democracy" to "transitional or hybrid regime" in 2020; Hungary was also the first EU member state to be labeled "partially free" (in 2019). The organization's 2020 report states that "Orbán's government in Hungary has similarly dropped any pretense of respecting democratic institutions". A 2018 article published in the Journal of Democracy also described Hungary as a hybrid regime. Recently Hungary also backslid in its view regarding LGBT rights in Hungary, creating a bill similar to the Section 28 bill.

In July 2021, leaked data acquired by the Pegasus Project suggested the Hungarian government may have used NSO Group's Pegasus spyware to target opposition journalists. Hungarian officials acknowledged that they had purchased the spyware, but noted that they had received permission from either the courts or the Ministry of Justice in every case it was used.

== Italy ==
In 2025, Civil Liberties Union for Europe highlighted how Giorgia Meloni's government had drafted proposals to give open-ended powers to the justice ministry over prosecutors, which would increase political control over the judiciary. The report also flagged unprecedented levels of interference in public service media, such as the cancellation of the author Antonio Scurati's anti-fascist manifesto and the disciplinary case opened against the host of the talkshow in which the speech was to have been performed.

== Montenegro ==
Freedom House reported in 2020 that Montenegro under president Milo Đukanović was no longer a democracy, but only a hybrid regime. Shortly after that report was published, the opposition won the 2020 Montenegrin parliamentary election and Zdravko Krivokapić was appointed to the office of Prime Minister. Đukanović himself was later unseated by opposition candidate Jakov Milatović in the 2023 Montenegrin presidential election. The 2024 V-Dem Democracy Report claimed Montenegro advanced to "non-ambiguous" electoral democracy.

== North Macedonia ==
Prime Minister Nikola Gruevski's VMRO-DPMNE government, which was in power from 2006 to 2016, has been described as engaging in democratic backsliding. In 2015, Gruevski's Interior Minister and intelligence chief resigned after a scandal in which it was found the Macedonian government had wiretapped media outlets, the judiciary, prosecutors and political opponents. Following Gruevski's departure from office as part of the Pržino Agreement, on 23 May 2018, he was sentenced to two years in prison for unlawfully influencing government officials in the purchase of a luxury bulletproof car. He subsequently fled the country and was granted political asylum in Hungary.

== Poland ==
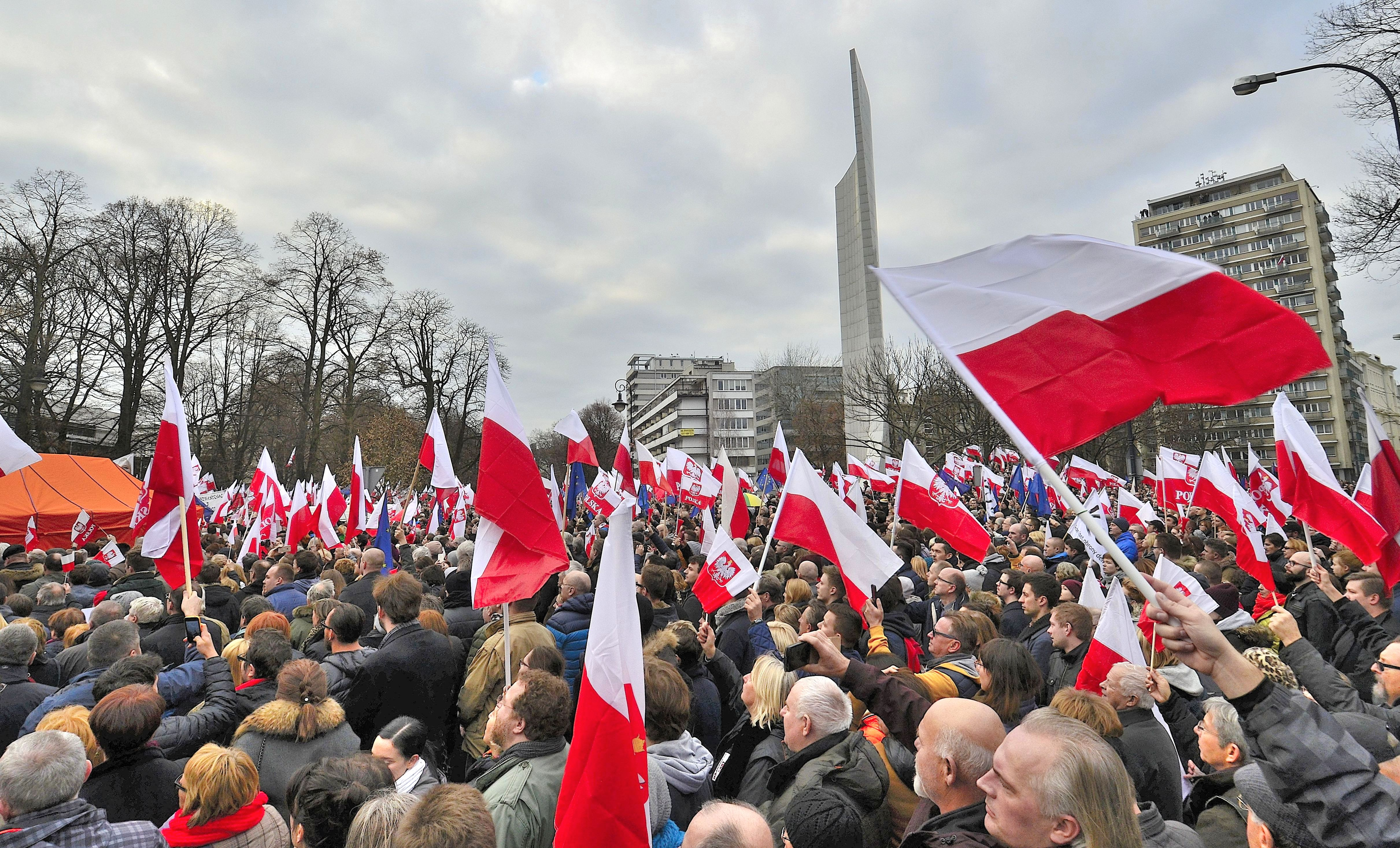
Protest against the Polish government led by the Law and Justice (PiS) party

In the Polish case, the European Commission stated in December 2017 that in the two preceding years, the Parliament of Poland had adopted "13 laws affecting the entire structure of the justice system in Poland" with the "common pattern [that] the executive and legislative branches [were] systematically enabled to politically interfere in the composition, powers, administration, and functioning of the judicial branch." In February 2020, Věra Jourová, Vice President of the European Commission for Values and Transparency, described the disciplining of judges in Poland as "no longer a targeted intervention against individual black sheep, similar to other EU member states, but a case of carpet bombing. ... This is no reform, it's destruction." In late September 2020, 38 European and other law professors called on the President of the European Commission to take action in Poland, stating:

Polish authorities continue to openly abuse, harass and intimidate judges and prosecutors who are seeking to defend the rule of law. In addition, Polish authorities continue to openly defy the authority of the Court of Justice by refusing to follow its judgments. ... judges who are attempting to apply EU law are being threatened and punished while those who flaunt violations of EU law are being rewarded. ... The rule of law in Poland is not merely being attacked. It is being destroyed in plain sight.

Historical V-Dem Democracy Indices for electoral democracy (solid) and liberal democracy (dotted) for Poland

Following the 2023 parliamentary election and the re-appointment of Donald Tusk as prime minister, there were indicators of a reverse trend towards democratisation.

Since coming to power, Tusk's coalition oversaw the 2025 Polish presidential election, in which politicians and journalists aligned with the ruling coalition questioned the election results. Roman Giertych claimed opposition committed organized electoral fraud, claiming also that Nawrocki's campaign was advantaged by a right-leaning TikTok algorithm, which helped them in the campaign. Many other journalists and politicians, like PKW member Ryszard Kalisz, called for a recount of the election. Other figures, like Prime Minister Donald Tusk and Trzaskowski's chief of staff or organizations like the Conference of Ambassadors and Committee for the Defence of Democracy also cast doubt on the election results.

Following the election, Prime Minister Donald Tusk attempted to have the Marshal of the Sejm, Szymon Hołownia, block or postpone the inauguration of Karol Nawrocki as president of Poland due to alleged election fraud by calling an indefinite break during the National Assembly (the joint session of the Sejm and Senat), during Nawrocki's inauguration, after which the Marshal of the Sejm would serve as acting president, which was described by some as an attempt to conduct a coup d'etat. Following Hołownia's refusal of the idea, pro-government outlets like Gazeta Wyborcza accused Hołownia of treason against the Constitution.

In February 2026, President Nawrocki proposed new legislation that would imprison officials who "persistently question" his powers or of PiS-appointed judges for up to ten years, which was subsequently condemned by the Polish government as "autocratic".

== Romania ==
The Social Democratic Party (PSD) has been repeatedly accused of democratic backsliding while in power in Romania, initially during the tenure of Prime Minister Victor Ponta, who led the country during the 2012 Romanian constitutional crisis, when Ponta engaged in several unconstitutional actions in an attempt to impeach President Traian Băsescu. Ponta's conduct was criticized by the European Union and the United States.

Ponta was accused of restricting voting among the Romanian diaspora in the 2014 Romanian presidential election, during which Ponta was running as the PSD presidential candidate. Following the election, which Ponta lost, his close ally, Sebastian Ghiță, was indicted for offering illegal incentives to Moldovans with Romanian citizenship to vote for Ponta. Ghiță subsequently fled the country for Serbia, due to his good relationship with Serbian President Aleksandar Vučić. Ponta also left Romania for Serbia from 2016 to 2018, receiving Serbian citizenship and serving as an advisor to Vučic.

After facing a corruption investigation in 2015, Ponta initially refused to resign as Prime Minister of Romania, prompting a political crisis. After the 2015 Romanian protests, Ponta ultimately resigned in November 2015.

PSD leader Liviu Dragnea, who was accused of vote rigging during the 2012 Romanian presidential impeachment referendum, was ultimately convicted in 2015. He was later indicted for abuse of office in 2016, preventing him from running for Prime Minister.

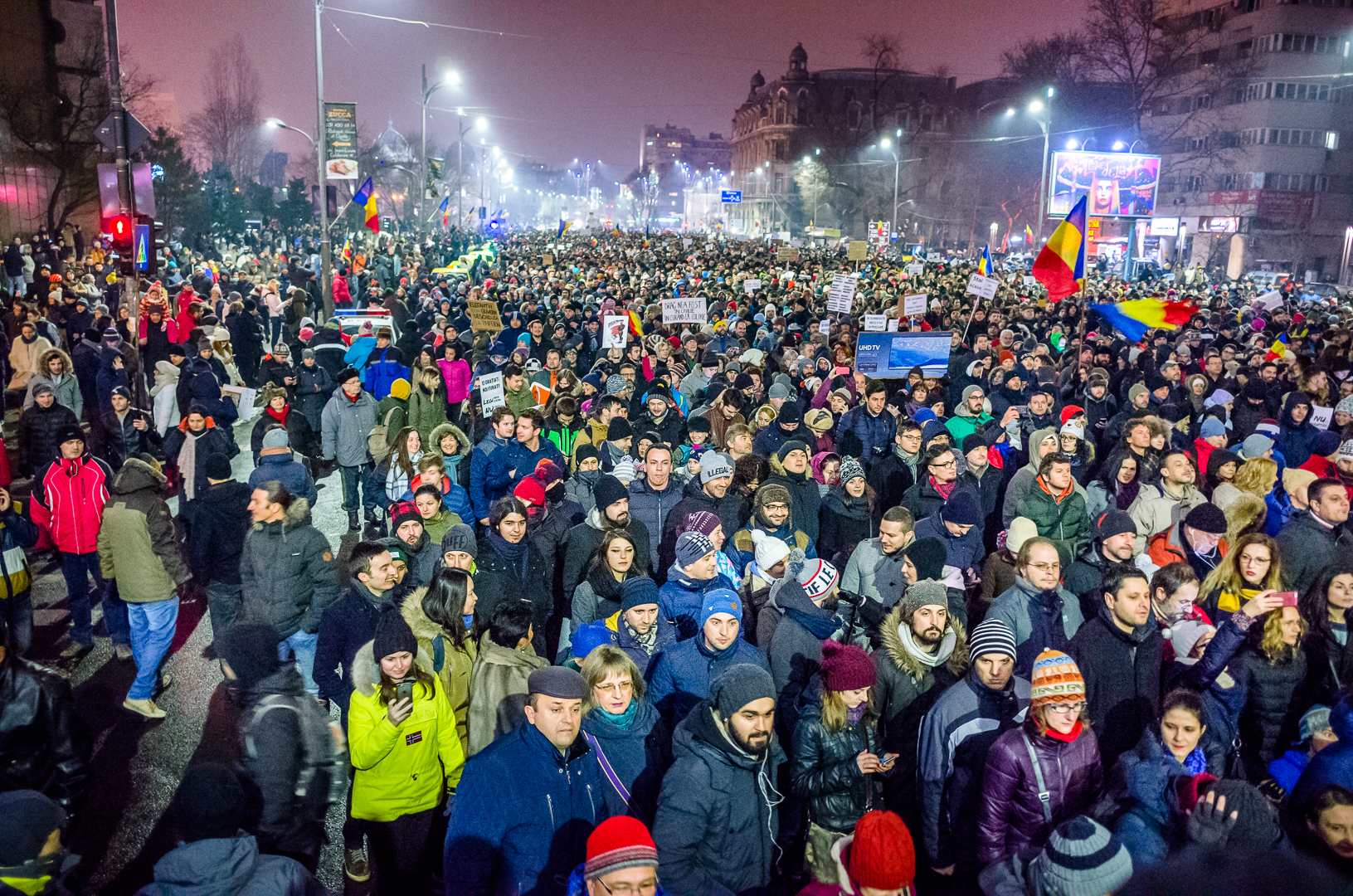
2017–2019 Romanian protests against government policies and corruption

In 2017, PSD Prime Minister Sorin Grindeanu's government passed new legislation decriminalising misconduct by officials, which was condemned by President Klaus Iohannis as a "day of mourning for the rule of law" in Romania. The legislation led to the 2017 Romanian protests.

In 2019, Romania indicted Laura Codruța Kövesi, the former chief prosecutor of the National Anticorruption Directorate, who was running for European Chief Prosecutor at the time, leading EU authorities to condemn Romania for backsliding on the rule of law. Critics claimed that Romania's indictment of Kövesi was motivated by her indictment of numerous politicians, including Dragnea, on corruption charges. Ponta, who had then become an opponent of Dragnea and the Romanian government after leaving the PSD, criticized the decision and described the PSD as increasingly "Fidesz-like", referring to the Hungarian ruling party.

The European Commission and European Court of Justice Advocate-General have criticized Romania's 2020 judicial reforms, suggesting that they undermined the rule of law in the country. The PSD lost power after the 2020 Romanian legislative election, with the new government pledging to reverse the reforms to comply with the EU's Mechanism for Cooperation and Verification.

After 2020 and especially after the 2021 political crisis, some sources claimed that president Klaus Iohannis' leadership has become increasingly illiberal, authoritarian, kleptocratic and corrupt.

In February 2025, a Romanian Constitutional Court judge described threats made against judges by ultranationalist presidential candidate Călin Georgescu as anti-democratic and dangerous. The Court had annulled the results of the 2024 Romanian presidential election after Russian interference to promote Georgescu.

== Russia ==
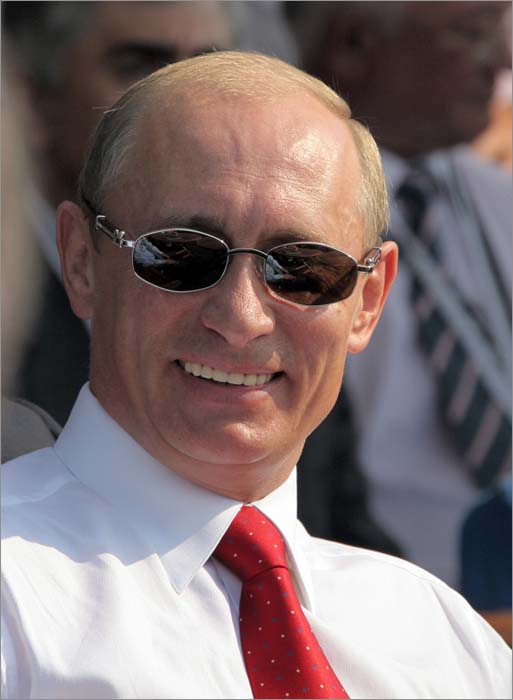
Under Putin's leadership, Russia has turned into an authoritarian state.

Under over two decades of Vladimir Putin's leadership, the Russian Federation has experienced major democratic backsliding. Putin became acting President of Russia with the resignation of Boris Yeltsin in 1999, was elected to a full term in the 2000 Russian presidential election, and was able to use "public and elite dissatisfaction with the instability of the 1990s" to consolidate power in his hands, while overseeing a decade of economic growth. The centralization of power under Putin weakened the power of the Federal Assembly, and led to a return to more autocratic rule seen during the Soviet Union. In the late 1990s during the presidency of Boris Yeltsin, Freedom House gave Russia a score of 4 (out of 7; 1 meaning rights are fully protected, 7 meaning they are fully violated) for "freedom, civil liberties and political rights".

Historical V-Dem Democracy Indices for electoral democracy (solid) and liberal democracy (dotted) for Russia

Following subsequent de-democratization, experts do not generally consider Russia to be a democracy, citing purges and jailing of the government's political opponents, curtailed press freedom, and the lack of free and fair elections. An example of the jailing of the regime's political opponents occurred after the 2021 Russian protests when Alexei Navalny was arrested and sent to a penal colony. The Anti-Corruption Foundation, led by Navalny, was later deemed an extremist organization. In 2021 more journalists and news outlets were declared foreign agents, with Russian channel TV Rain added to that list. The Freedom House then in 2021 gave Russia a score of 20/100 and described it as not free. After serving 17 years as president, Putin, in 2021, signed a law allowing him to run in two more elections, potentially keeping him in power until 2036 with the 2020 amendments to the Constitution of Russia, leaving little constraint on his power. Putin's 2012 "foreign agents law" targeted NGOs and furthered the crackdown on internal dissent.

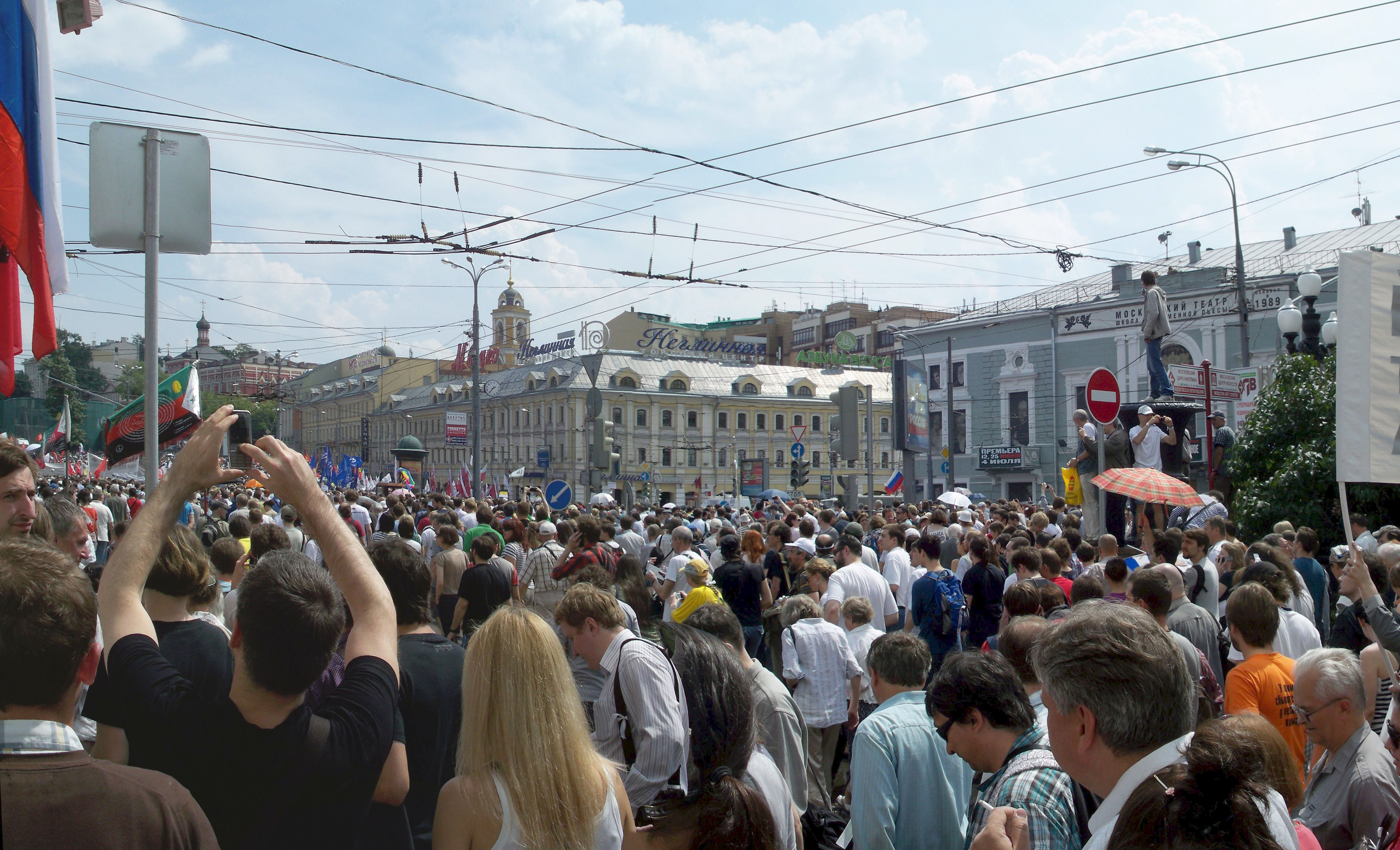
Russians protest against Putin's re-election in 2012

Scholars differ in their perspectives on the significance of post-1998 democratic backsliding in Russia under Putin. Some view Russia's 1990s-era trend toward European-style democratization as fundamentally an ephemeral aberration, with Russia's subsequent democratic backsliding representing a return to its "natural" historical course. The opposite perspective is that the democratic decline under Putin would be a relatively short-term episode in Russian history: "From this perspective, Russia after 1991 was back on the path to Europe after the seventy-year interruption represented by communism", and "that path was inevitably to be bumpy and subject to setbacks."

== Serbia ==
Freedom House's annual Nations in Transit report in 2020 reported that, due to democratic backsliding, Serbia was no longer a democracy but had instead become a hybrid regime (in the "gray zone" between "democracies and pure autocracies"). The report cited "years of increasing state capture, abuse of power, and strongman tactics employed" by Serbian President Aleksandar Vučić.

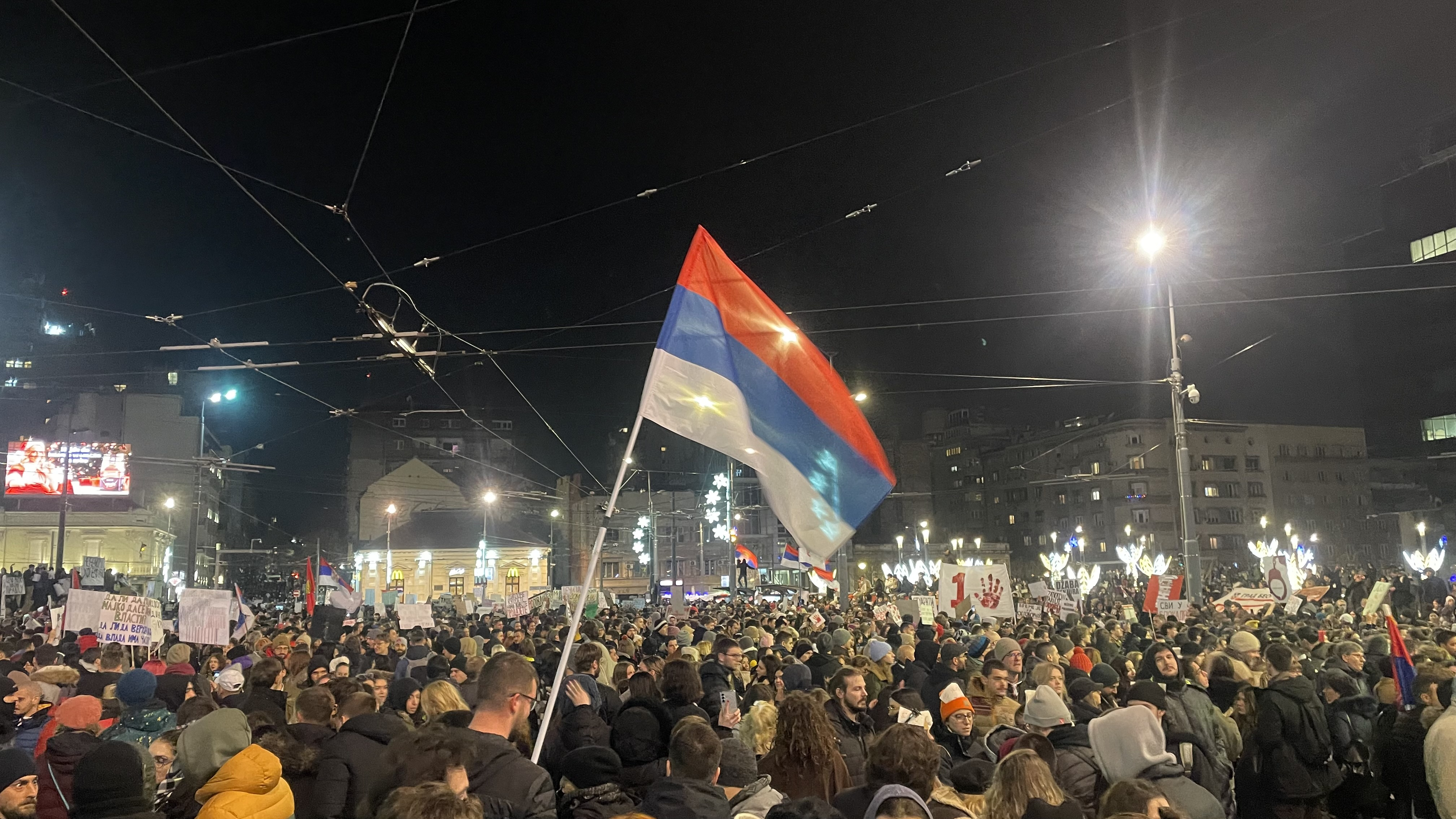
2024–present Serbian anti-corruption protests

The 2018–2020 Serbian protests were in-part aimed at opposing "growing authoritarian rule" under Vučić. Most opposition parties subsequently boycotted the 2020 Serbian parliamentary election, with OSCE observers saying "the pervasive influence of the ruling parties gave them undue advantage".

The OSCE's Office for Democratic Institutions and Human Rights and Serbian NGOs reported election irregularities in the 2023 Serbian parliamentary election to the advantage of the ruling Serbian Progressive Party, leading to the 2023 Serbian election protests.

The Serbian government has been accused by the opposition of police brutality to suppress the 2024–present Serbian anti-corruption protests.

== Slovakia ==
The tenure of Vladimír Mečiar as Slovak Prime Minister and President in the 1990s after the dissolution of Czechoslovakia has been described by political scientists Elisabeth Bakke and Nick Sitter as a period of democratic backsliding, due to Mečiar's control over state media and centralisation of executive power.

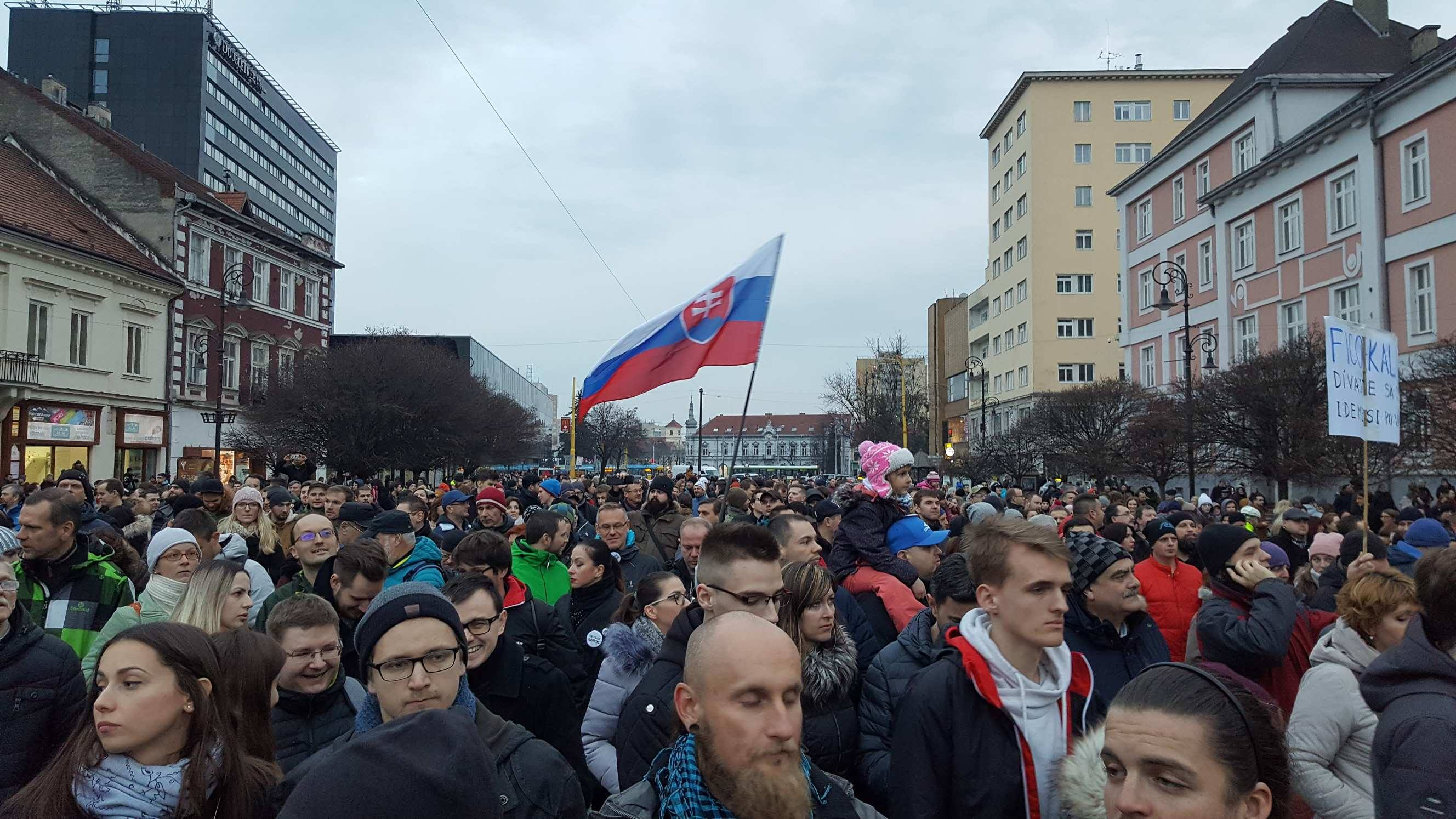
Protest in Košice following the murder of Ján Kuciak

Widespread protests in 2018 following the murder of Ján Kuciak have been described by some scholars as "helping to stave off democratic backsliding" by causing the resignation of Robert Fico, who served as Prime Minister from 2006 to 2010 and 2012 to 2018. However, Bakke and Sitter have disputed allegations of democratic backsliding against Fico, noting that Fico often emphasized "his commitment to pluralistic democracy", which contrasted with the Polish and Hungarian leadership during that time period and Slovakia under Mečiar.

Following Fico's 2023 return to power, he enacted judicial reforms, including the dissolution of the anti-corruption Special Prosecutor's Office, in what has been described as democratic backsliding. This caused protests and prompted the European Parliament and the European Commission to express concerns about the state of rule of law in Slovakia. Further protests ensued in 2024 after Fico's Culture Minister, Martina Šimkovičová of the nationalist Slovak National Party, dismissed the heads of two key Slovak cultural institutions, the Slovak National Gallery and the Slovak National Theatre, and dissolved the Slovak national broadcaster RTVS and replaced it with a new one, STVR. In December 2025, there were further protests aimed at encouraging President Peter Pellegrini to veto additional judicial reforms passed by the Fico government, including dismantlement of a whistleblower protection agency.

== Slovenia ==
Prime Minister Janez Janša was criticised by Žiga Faktor of the EUROPEUM Institute for European Policy for overseeing democratic backsliding in Slovenia. Faktor claimed that Janša had aligned Slovenia closely with Hungary, denied journalists access to information during the COVID-19 pandemic, and had expanded his Slovenian Democratic Party's influence over the country's media with Hungarian financial support.

Janša left office in June 2022, following his defeat in the 2022 Slovenian parliamentary election by the Freedom Movement leader Robert Golob, who entered politics to stop democratic backsliding in Slovenia.

== Sweden ==
Gender studies scholars Karlberg, Korolczuk and Sältenberg argue that the rise of anti-gender rhetoric in Sweden is part of a broader process of "insidious de-democratization", which they describe as a set of discourses and practices that erode liberal democracy by marginalizing already vulnerable groups. They highlight the influence of "gender-critical" and right-wing anti-trans rhetoric targeting transgender people in Sweden.

== Ukraine ==
Several Ukrainian governments have faced accusations of democratic backsliding.

Prior to the removal of President Viktor Yanukovych in the 2014 Ukrainian revolution, Ukraine was described by political scientist Eleanor Knott as experiencing democratic backsliding and "soft authoritarianism".

The Atlantic Council's Maxim Eristavi claimed in 2017 that "Ukrainian democracy is in danger" following President Petro Poroshenko's attempts to arrest his former ally and opposition figure Mikheil Saakashvili, and calls by Poroshenko's party for criminal investigations into another political opponent, Yulia Tymoshenko.

In early 2021, President Volodymyr Zelenskyy drew criticism for democratic backsliding from members of the U.S. House of Representatives following Zelenskyy's firing of a pro-reform cabinet and the resignation of former National Bank of Ukraine Governor Yakiv Smolii. Melinda Haring of the Atlantic Council stated that the Constitutional Court of Ukraine's removal of authority from the National Agency for Prevention of Corruption risked putting the country "on the edge of a major constitutional crisis" and criticized Zelenskyy's attempts to reform the Ukrainian judiciary as "ineffectual".

== United Kingdom ==
The United Kingdom was described as autocratizing by the 2026 V-Dem Democracy Report.

== See also ==
- Democracy in Europe
