= Katerina Linos =

Greek American political scientist (born 1979)

- Born: Κατερίνα Λινού
- Citizenship: United States, Greece
- Known for: Research on diffusion of ideas around the world
- Title: I. Michael Heyman Professor of Law
- Awards: APSA Giovanni Sartori Prize, ISA Chadwick Alger Prize, Peter Katzenstein Prize, Carnegie Fellowship, CASBS Fellowship

Academic background
- Education: Harvard University (BA, JD, PhD)
- Thesis: Diffusion of Social Policies Across OECD Countries (2007)
- Doctoral advisor: Beth A. Simmons

Academic work
- Discipline: Law, political science
- Sub-discipline: International law, Human Rights Law, Immigration law, Refugee law, Comparative law, European Union law
- Institutions: UC Berkeley School of Law
- Website: https://www.law.berkeley.edu/our-faculty/faculty-profiles/katerina-linos/

Katerina Linos is an American legal scholar. She is the I. Michael Heyman Professor of Law and Co-Director of Miller Institute for Global Challenges and the Law at the University of California, Berkeley School of Law. Her areas of expertise include international law, comparative law, European Union law, employment law, Immigration law, Refugee law, Human rights, Law and economics, Law and society, Empirical legal studies, and Social science research methodology.

== Early life and education ==
Linos completed her Bachelor of Arts in government at Harvard College in 2000, where she graduated magna cum laude. In 2002, She received a diploma in European Union law at European University Institute. She then continued her study at Harvard, graduated with a JD and PhD in Political Science in 2006 and 2007 respectively. From 2006 to 2009, Linos was a Junior Fellow at the Society of Fellows at Harvard University.

== Career and scholarship ==
Linos is best known for her scholarship on policy diffusion. In her 2013 book "The Democratic Foundations of Policy Diffusion," she argues that policy ideas spread not only through technocratic networks, but also through democratic processes. The book won three national prizes: the Giovanni Sartori Prize, the Chadwick Alder Prize, and the Peter Katzenstein Prize. It was also selected for the Best Books of 2013 on Western Europe by Foreign Affairs.

Linos also studies refugee and migration law. In 2017, Linos was awarded a Carnegie Fellowship to study the European migrant crisis. Her UC Berkeley & UC Davis collaborative interactive data project, "Digital Refuge," tells the story of the migrant crisis from the perspective of refugees themselves, using over 10,000 Facebook post and 6,000 interview data with refugees. Linos examines how (mis)information shapes refugee and migration law, evaluates progressive and conservative innovations, and explores the strong rationales for financing climate mobility.

In addition to her substantive work, Linos has made important methodological contributions, identifying best practices for using qualitative research methodology for international law, comparative human rights law, and migration and refugee law studies and for general legal scholarship.

In 2021, Linos began hosting "Borderlines," a podcast covering cutting edge issues in international law. Past guests include European Commissioner for Competition Margrethe Vestager, former President of the International Court of Justice Joan Donoghue, and former Greek Prime Minister George Papandreou. Co-hosted by Mark A. Pollack, the Court of Justice of the European Union (CJEU) Series of Borderlines has been building a public archive of biographies of and interviews with current and former judges and advocates general of the European Court of Justice. The Borderlines CJEU Series published more than 15 episodes so far, with full interviews transcripts and links to cases and sources mentioned in the interviews, such as opinions, judgments, press releases, laws, speeches, and publications.

Linos spent the 2024-2025 academic year as a Fellow at the Center for Advanced Study in the Behavioral Sciences at Stanford University, researching how the European Union has developed comprehensive initiatives rapidly in the fields of technology, finance, and migration.

== Teaching ==
Courses Linos teaches include international business transactions, international law, European Union law, and international organizations.

== Publications ==
=== Book ===
- The Democratic Foundations of Policy Diffusion. New York: Oxford University Press. 2013. ISBN 9780199967872.

=== Selected articles ===
- Linos, Katerina. "Diffusion through Democracy." 55 (3) Am. J. Pol. Sc. 678 (2011).
- Guzman, Andrew T., and Katerina Linos. "Human Rights Backsliding." Calif. L. Rev. 83, no. 3 (2014).
- Linos, Katerina. "How to Select and Develop International Law Case Studies: Lessons from Comparative Law and Comparative Politics." 109 Am. J. Int'l L 475 (2015).
- Linos, Katerina, and Kimberly Twist. "The Supreme Court, the Media, and Public Opinion: Comparing Experimental and Observational Methods." J. Legal Stud. 45, No. 2 (2016).
- Linos, Katerina, and Melissa Carlson. "Qualitative Methods for Law Review Writing." 84 U. Chi. L. Rev. 213 (2017).
- Carlson, Melissa, Laura Jakli, and Katerina Linos. "Rumors and Refugees: How Government-Created Information Vacuums Undermine Effective Crisis Management." International Studies Quarterly 62 (2018).
- Carlson, Melissa, Laura Jakli, and Katerina Linos. "Refugees Misdirected: How Information, Misinformation, and Rumors Shape Refugees’ Access to Fundamental Rights." 57 Virg. J. Int'l L. 3 (2018).
- Chilton, Adam, and Katerina Linos. "Preferences and Compliance with International Law." 22 Theoretical Inquiries in Law 247 (2021).
- Linos, Katerina, and Elena Chachko. "Qualitative Methods in the Study of Migration and Refugee Law." in Oxford Handbook of Comparative Immigration Law (Kevin Cope, Stella Burch Elias, and Jill Goldenziel eds., Forthcoming).
- Linos, Katerina, and Elena Chachko. "Refugee Responsibility Sharing or Responsibility Dumping?" 110 Calif. L. Rev. 897 (2022).
- Chachko, Elena, and Katerina Linos. "Ukraine and the Emergency Powers of International Institutions." 116 Am. J. Int'l L. 775 (2022).
- Linos, Katerina, and Kristina Daugirdas. "Back to Basics: The Benefits of Paradigmatic International Organizations." 14 Harv. Nat'l Sec. J. 181 (2023).
- Daugirdas, Kristina, and Katerina Linos. "Are International Organizations Obsolete?" 20 Int'l Org. L. Rev. 263 (2023).
- Bradford, Anu, Adam Chilton, and Katerina Linos. "The Gravity of Legal Diffusion." 2023 U. Chi. Legal F. 35 (2023).
- Bradford, Anu, Adam Chilton, and Katerina Linos. "Dynamic Diffusion." 27 J. Int'l Econ. L. 538 (2024).
- Carlson, Melissa, Elena Kempf, Katerina Linos. "Qualitative Methods in Comparative Human Rights Law." in Oxford Handbook on Comparative Human Rights Law (Neha Jain and Mila Versteeg eds., Oxford University Press, Forthcoming).
- Chachko, Elena, and Katerina Linos. "Emergency Powers for Good." 66 Wm. & Mary L. Rev. 1 (2024).
- Kempf, Elena, and Katerina Linos. "NGEU: A New Marshall Plan for Europe and a Template for Global Finance." 118 Am. J. Int'l L. Unbound 151 (2024).
- Linos, Katerina. "Qualitative Social Science Methods for Legal Scholarship: From Complex Data to Compelling Narratives." 119 Proceedings of the American Society of International Law Annual Meeting 73 (2025).
- Bradford, Anu, Adam Chilton, and Katerina Linos. "The Limits and Promise of Global Antitrust Law." 66 Harv. J. Int'l L. 431 (2025).
- Linos, Katerina. "Financing Climate Mobility – from Duty to Investment." 119 Am. J. Int'l L. Unbound 107 (2025).
- Chilton, Adam, Katerina Linos, Anup Malani, and Zainab Tabassum. "Forced Migration and Women’s Empowerment: Evidence from Rohingya Refugees." 52 (9) Journal of Ethnic and Migration Studies 2135 (2025).
- Deli, Janka, and Katerina Linos. "Silver Linings of the EU Migration Pact: Progressive Elements, Binding Solidarity, and Their Limits." in Challenges of European Refugee and Asylum Law and Policy (Iris Goldner Lang and Janine Silga eds., Oxford University Press, 2027).
