= Ayelet Shachar =

Legal scholar

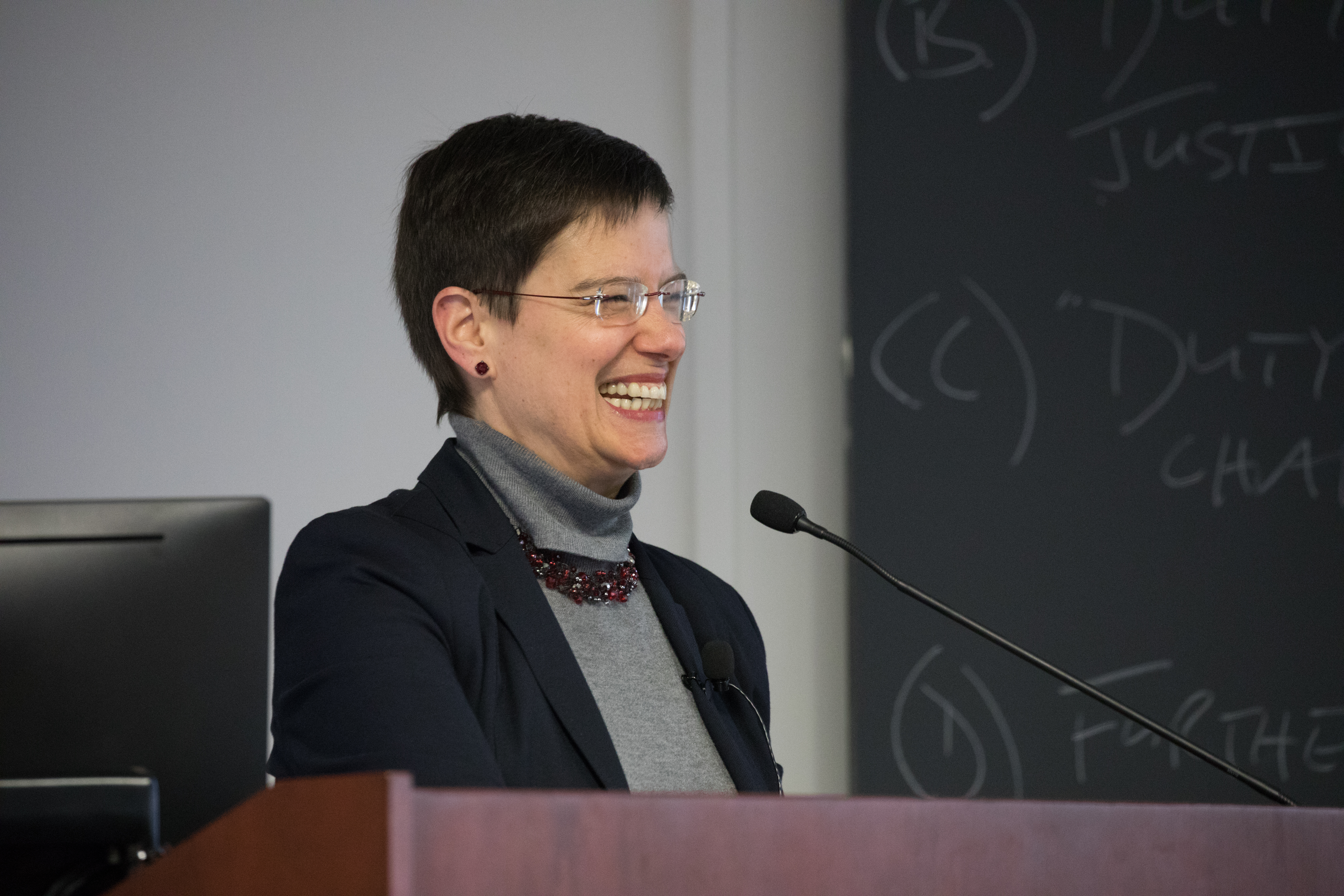
- Born: איילת שחר; June 4, 1966 (age 60)
- Spouse: Ran Hirschl

Academic background
- Education: LLB., B.A., Tel Aviv University; LLM., J.S.D., Yale Law School
- Thesis: The dark side of multicultural accommodation: a philosophical and legal investigation into the effects of family law policies on women's citizenship status (1997)

Academic work
- Institutions: University of Toronto

Ayelet Shachar FRSC (Hebrew: איילת שחר; born June 4, 1966) is a legal scholar. From 2015-2020 she was the Director of the Max Planck Institute for the Study of Religious and Ethnic Diversity in Göttingen. She previously held the Canada Research Chair in Citizenship and Multiculturalism at the University of Toronto.

== Education ==
Shachar earned her Bachelor of Arts and LL.B. at Tel Aviv University before moving to the United States and studying at Yale Law School. After earning her LL.M. and J.S.D. at Yale, she was the recipient of Yale's W.M. Keck Foundation Fellow in Legal Ethics.

== Career ==
Shachar accepted a position at the University of Toronto in 1999 as a visiting professor. Two years later, she published her first book, "Multicultural Jurisdictions: Cultural Differences and Women’s Rights" through the Cambridge University Press. The book won the American Political Science Association's 2002 Foundations of Political Theory Section Best First Book Award. The following year, Shachar accepted an Monnet Center Emile Noël Senior Fellows at New York University. Shachar was later appointed to assistant professor, Associate Professor, and finally became a Full Professor of Law, Political Science and Global Affairs.

As Shachar accepted her new appointment, she also became a Canada Research Chair with her husband Ran Hirschl. In the following year, Shachar received grants and awards to continue her research on citizenship. In 2005, she was the recipient of the Connaught Research Fellowship in the Social Science. In 2006, prior to leaving for a Visiting Fellowship at Stanford Law School, Shachar earned a grant from the Social Sciences and Humanities Research Council to research and write her new book on citizenship. By 2009, she published "The Birthright Lottery," which suggested that since citizenship is transferred by birthright, an entirely new category of citizenship transfer needs to be created to correct global injustice. A later article written on the theme of Citizenship, which was published in the Oxford Handbook of Comparative Constitutional Law, was the recipient of the Chapter Award of the Migration and Citizenship section of the American Political Science Association.

In 2014, Shachar was elected a Fellow of the Royal Society of Canada for her contributions to the fields of international ethics and global justice. The next year, she became the Director of the Max Planck Institute for the Study of Religious and Ethnic Diversity. A few years later, she was the recipient of the 2019 Gottfried Wilhelm Leibniz Prize to conduct research on Citizenship in Germany.
