= Beth A. Simmons =

American political scientist (born 1958)

Beth Simmons
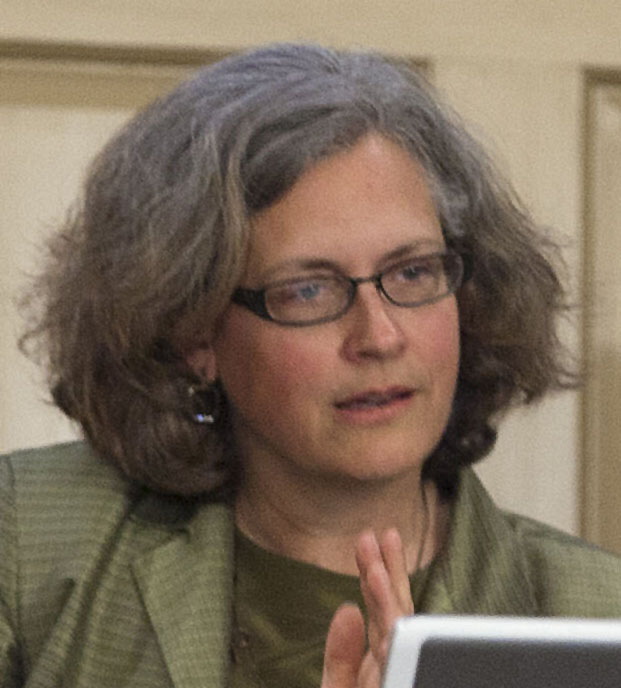
- Simmons in 2012
- Born: Beth Ann Simmons; 1958 (age 67–68); California, U.S.
- Education: University of Redlands (BA); University of Chicago (MA); Harvard University (MA, PhD)
- Known for: Mobilizing for Human Rights, Who Adjusts?
- Title: Andrea Mitchell University Professor in Law, Political Science and Business Ethics
- Awards: Karl Deutsch Award, ISA; Stein Rokkan Prize for Comparative Social Science Research
- Scientific career
- Fields: Political science; International relations
- Workplaces: University of Pennsylvania Law School
- Doctoral advisor: Robert Keohane
- Other academic advisors: James Alt, Stephan Haggard
- Doctoral students: Ben Ansell, Adam Chilton, Katerina Linos

Beth Ann Simmons (born 1958) is an American academic and international relations scholar. She is the Andrea Mitchell University Professor in Law, Political Science and Business Ethics at the University of Pennsylvania Law School. She is a former director of the Weatherhead Center for International Affairs at Harvard University and Clarence Dillon Professor of International Affairs at the Department of Government. Her research interests include international relations, political economy, international law, and international human rights law compliance.

== Early life ==
Simmons was born in 1958 in the San Francisco Bay Area in California and attended Monta Vista High School in Cupertino, California where she excelled in speech, debate, and music. She earned a BA in political science and philosophy summa cum laude from the University of Redlands, an MA in international relations from the University of Chicago, and an MA and PhD in government from Harvard, where she was a student of international relations theorist Robert Keohane.

== Career ==
Simmons taught as an assistant professor at Duke University (1991–1996) in the research department at the International Monetary Fund (1995-1996) and as an associate professor at the University of California, Berkeley (1996–2002) before joining the faculty of Harvard University in 2002, where she was Clarence Dillon Professor of International Affairs and Director of the Weatherhead Center for International Affairs.

In 2016, she became Andrea Mitchell University Professor in Law and Political Science at the University of Pennsylvania Law School.

Simmons served as President of the International Studies Association from 2011–2012. She was succeeded as president by Etel Solingen of the University of California, Irvine. Her research is now concentrated on internation borders, border governance, human rights, and the diffusion of norms in global politics. In September 2025, Simmons became President of the American Political Science Association.

== Awards and honors ==
- 2009: Elected to the American Academy of Arts and Sciences
- 2010: Awarded the Stein Rokkan Prize for Comparative Social Science Research.
- 2011: Karl Deutsch Award
- 2012: Guggenheim Fellowship
- 2013: Elected to the National Academy of Sciences
- 2017: Elected to the American Philosophical Society

== Books ==
- Simmons, Beth (1994), Who Adjusts? Domestic Sources of Foreign Economic Policy During the Interwar Years, 1923-1939, Princeton University Press, pp. 334, ISBN 978-0691017105 Won the Woodrow Wilson Award from American Political Science Association for best book published in the United States on government, politics, or international affairs.
- Simmons, Beth (2009), Mobilizing for Human Rights: International Law in Domestic Politics, Cambridge University Press, ISBN 978-0521712323 Was recognized by the American Society for International Law, the International Social Science Council and the International Studies Association as the best book of the year in 2010.
- Simmons, Beth (2008), The Global Diffusion of Markets and Democracy, Cambridge University Press
