= Stein Rokkan Prize for Comparative Social Science Research =

Social science award

- Awarded for: A very substantial and original contribution in comparative social science research
- Presented by: International Science Council, University of Bergen and European Consortium for Political Research
- First award: 1981
- Website: International Science Council; European Consortium for Political Research

The Stein Rokkan Prize for Comparative Social Science Research is an academic honour awarded by the International Science Council, the University of Bergen and the European Consortium for Political Research, in memory of the political scientist and sociologist Stein Rokkan. It is awarded to scholars who have made "a very substantial and original contribution in comparative social science research" in the form of a published monograph. The monograph must have been published within the two calendrical years preceding the award. The prize is awarded annually and is worth €5000.

According to a reputation survey conducted in 2013 and 2014, the Stein Rokkan Prize is the second most prestigious international academic award in political science, after the Johan Skytte Prize in Political Science. A reputation survey conducted in 2018 found the Stein Rokkan Prize to be the most prestigious interdisciplinary award in the social sciences (jointly with the Holberg Prize).

== Prize winners ==
Year	Image	Prize winner	Country	Work
1981		Manfred G. Schmidt	Germany	Wohlfahrtsstaatliche Politik unter bürgerlichen und sozialdemokratischen Regierungen: Ein internationaler Vergleich
1983		Jens Alber	Germany	Vom Armenhaus zum Wohlfahrtsstaat: Analysen zur Entwicklung der Sozialversicherung in Westeuropa (From the Poor House to the Welfare State: Analysis of the Development of Social Insurance in Western Europe), "Einige Grundlagen und Begleiterscheinungen der Entwicklung der Sozialausgaben in Westeuropa, 1949-1977" ("Some Causes and Consequences of Social Security Expenditure Development in Western Europe, 1949-1977")
1986		Louis M. Imbeau	Canada	Donor Aid: The Determinants of Development Allocations to Third World Countries
1988	Charles Ragin	Charles C. Ragin	United States	The Comparative Method: Moving beyond Qualitative and Quantitative Strategies
1990	Stefano Bartolini	Stefano Bartolini	Italy	Identity, Competition and Electoral Availability: The Stabilisation of European Electorates 1885-1985
1990		Peter Mair	Ireland	Identity, Competition and Electoral Availability: The Stabilisation of European Electorates 1885-1985
1992		Kaare Strøm	Norway	Minority Government and Majority Rule
1996		Kees van Kersbergen	Netherlands	Social Capitalism: A Study of Christian Democracy and the Welfare State
1998		Robert Rohrschneider	Germany; United States	Learning Democracy: Democratic and Economic Values in Unified Germany
2000		Eva Anduiza Perea	Spain	Individual and Systemic Determinants of Electoral Abstention in Western Europe
2002	Patrick Le Galès	Patrick Le Galès	France	European Cities: Social Conflicts and Governance
2004	Daniele Caramani	Daniele Caramani	Italy	The Nationalization of Politics: The Formation of National Electorates and Party Systems in Western Europe
2006		Milada Anna Vachudová	United States	Europe Undivided: Democracy, Leverage, and Integration after Communism
2008	Cas Mudde	Cas Mudde	Netherlands	Populist Radical Right Parties in Europe
2009	Robert E. Goodin	Robert E. Goodin	Australia; United States	Discretionary Time: A New Measure of Freedom
2009	James Mahmud Rice	James Mahmud Rice	Australia	Discretionary Time: A New Measure of Freedom
2009	Antti Parpo	Antti Parpo	Finland	Discretionary Time: A New Measure of Freedom
2009	Lina Eriksson	Lina Eriksson	Sweden	Discretionary Time: A New Measure of Freedom
2010	Beth A. Simmons	Beth A. Simmons	United States	Mobilizing for Human Rights: International Law in Domestic Politics
2011		James W. McGuire	United States	Wealth, Health, and Democracy in East Asia and Latin America
2012		Pepper D. Culpepper	United States	Quiet Politics and Business Power: Corporate Control in Europe and Japan
2013		Dorothee Bohle	Germany	Capitalist Diversity on Europe's Periphery
2013		Béla Greskovits	Hungary	Capitalist Diversity on Europe's Periphery
2014	Christian Welzel	Christian Welzel	Germany	Freedom Rising: Human Empowerment and the Quest for Emancipation
2015		Marius R. Busemeyer	Germany	Skills and Inequality: Partisan Politics and the Political Economy of Education Reforms in Western Welfare States
2016		Stanislav Markus	United States	Property, Predation, and Protection: Piranha Capitalism in Russia and Ukraine
2017		Abel Escribà-Folch	Spain	Foreign Pressure and the Politics of Autocratic Survival
2017		Joseph Wright	United States	Foreign Pressure and the Politics of Autocratic Survival
2018	Rafaela M. Dancygier	Rafaela M. Dancygier	United States	Dilemmas of Inclusion: Muslims in European Politics
2019		Andreas Wimmer	Switzerland	Nation Building: Why Some Countries Come Together while Others Fall Apart
2020		Jeffrey M. Chwieroth	United States	The Wealth Effect: How the Great Expectations of the Middle Class Have Changed the Politics of Banking Crises
2020		Andrew Walter	Australia	The Wealth Effect: How the Great Expectations of the Middle Class Have Changed the Politics of Banking Crises
2021		Ran Hirschl	Canada	City, State: Constitutionalism and the Megacity
2022	Vineeta Yadav	Vineeta Yadav	India; United States	Religious Parties and the Politics of Civil Liberties
2023	Elisabeth Anderson	Elisabeth Anderson	United States	Agents of Reform: Child Labor and the Origins of the Welfare State
2024	Anu Bradford	Anu Bradford	Finland; United States	Digital Empires: The Global Battle to Regulate Technology
2025		Vicente Valentim	Portugal; Spain	The Normalization of the Radical Right: A Norms Theory of Political Supply and Demand

Sources: The International Science Council and the European Consortium for Political Research.

== See also ==
- List of social sciences awards
