= Dorothee Bohle =

German political scientist

- Born: 1964 (age 60–61)
- Awards: Stein Rokkan Prize for Comparative Social Science Research

Academic work
- Discipline: Political scientist and professor at the Central European University
- Main interests: International political economy; European integration and eastward enlargement; transformation processes in Central and Eastern Europe

Dorothee Bohle (born 1964) is a German political scientist and professor at the European University Institute in Florence. Her work focuses on international political economy, European integration and eastward enlargement, as well as transformation processes in Central and Eastern Europe. She won the 2013 Stein Rokkan Prize for Comparative Social Science Research for her book Capitalist Diversity on Europe's Periphery (co-authored with Béla Greskovits).

== Career ==
Bohle studied political science in Hamburg, Berlin and Paris. Between 1994 and 1999, she worked at the Social Science Research Center in Berlin. She completed her doctorate at the Free University of Berlin in 2001. Between 2000 and 2016, she has taught international political economy at the Central European University in Budapest where, in 2013, she was appointed a professor. From 2016 to 2021, she was a professor of social and political change at the European University Institute, in Florence, Italy. Since 2021, she works as a professor of comparative politics at the University of Vienna.

== Selected publications ==
=== Books ===
- Bohle, D. & Greskovits, B., Capitalist Diversity on Europe's Periphery, Ithaca/London, Cornell University Press, 2012.
- Bohle, D., Europas neue Peripherie : Polens Transformation und transnationale Integration, Westfälisches Dampfboot, 2002.

=== Articles ===
- Bohle, D., Mortgaging Europe's periphery, LSE ‘Europe in Question’ Discussion Paper, 2017/124
- Bohle, D., & Jacoby, W., Lean, special, or consensual? : vulnerability and external buffering in the small states of East-Central Europe, Comparative politics, 2017, Vol. 49, No. 2, pp. 191–212
- Bohle, D., European integration, capitalist diversity and crises trajectories on Europe's Eastern periphery, New political economy, 2017, Vol. 23, No. 2, pp. 239-253
