= Ran Hirschl =

Canadian political scientist (1963–2026)

Ran Hirschl FRSC
- רן הירשל
- Born: September 23, 1963; Israel
- Died: May 19, 2026 (aged 62)
- Citizenship: Canadian
- Title: Professor
- Spouse: Ayelet Shachar
- Awards: Stein Rokkan Prize for Comparative Social Science Research

Academic background
- Education: Tel Aviv University (BA, LLB, MA); Yale University (MPhil, PhD)
- Thesis: Do bills of rights matter?: a comparative inquiry into the political sources and the de facto consequences of the constitutionalization of rights (1999)

Academic work
- Institutions: The University of Toronto
- Main interests: Comparative constitutional law Comparative politics Constitutional theocracy Urban constitutionalism

Ran Hirschl FRSC (September 23, 1963 – May 19, 2026; Hebrew: רן הירשל) was a political scientist and comparative legal scholar. He was the David R. Cameron Distinguished Professor of Law and Politics at the University of Toronto. Previously, he held the Canada Research Chair in Constitutionalism, Democracy and Development at the University of Toronto. He authored five major books and over one hundred and fifty articles on constitutional law and its intersection with comparative politics and society. With Tom Ginsburg and Zachary Elkins, he edited over 65 books for a series on Comparative Law at Cambridge University Press. In 2014, he was elected a Fellow of the Royal Society of Canada. In 2021, he was awarded the Stein Rokkan Prize for Comparative Social Science Research for his book City, State: Constitutionalism and the Megacity.

== Personal life and death ==
Hirschl was born in 1963. He studied law and political science at Tel Aviv University in Israel and, upon receiving a Fulbright scholarship, he received his doctorate from Yale University in 1999.

Hirschl died on May 19, 2026, of cancer.

== Career ==
Upon receiving his PhD, Hirschl joined the department of political science at the University of Toronto (U of T) as an assistant professor in 1999, and promoted to associate professor in 2003 and to full professor in 2006. In this role, he studied Canadian and comparative public law, constitutional and judicial politics earning him a cross-faculty appointment to U of T's Faculty of Law. Prior to his appointment, Hirschl published his first book titled Towards Juristocracy in 2004 through Harvard University Press, winner of the American Political Science Association (APSA) Law & Courts Section 2021 Lasting Contribution Award. His book argued that constitutional reform understood as the transfer of power from representative institutions to judiciaries is often the product of a strategic move he termed "hegemonic preservation" led by challenged political elites who aspire to entrench their worldviews and policy preferences against the vicissitudes of democratic politics. The following year, Hirschl and his wife Ayelet Shachar were awarded Canada Research Chairs (CRC) positions, with him being appointed a Tier 1 CRC in Constitutionalism, Democracy, and Development.

As a Canada Research Chair, Hirschl published his second book on the topic of Constitutional theocracy which received the 2011 Mahoney Prize in Legal Theory from the Julius Stone Institute of Jurisprudence in the Faculty of Law at the University of Sydney. Following this, he was awarded the Canada Council for the Arts' Killam Research Fellowship, which he planned to use towards completing his third book on the foundations and evolution of comparative constitutional studies. The book, titled Comparative Matters: The Renaissance of Comparative Constitutional Studies, was eventually published in 2014 and received the American Political Science Association C. Herman Pritchett Award for the Best Book on Law & Courts for 2015. In the same year as the book's publication, Hirschl was elected Fellow of the Royal Society of Canada.

From 2015 to 2018, Professor Hirschl served as Co-President of the International Society of Public Law (ICON-S). Between 2021 and 2023, he was Professor of Government and Earl E. Sheffield Regents Chair in Law at The University of Texas at Austin. Professor Hirschl held distinguished visiting professorships at Harvard University, NYU, the University of Goettingen, and the National University of Singapore (NUS). His work has been translated into various languages (from French, Dutch and Spanish to Turkish, Hebrew and Mandarin), cited by jurists and in high court decisions worldwide, and addressed in leading media venues from the CBC, New York Times and Folha de São Paulo to Le Figaro, Deutsche Welle, and the Jerusalem Post. In 2017, he was awarded an Alexander von Humboldt International Research Award by the Humboldt Foundation. Hirschl was awarded the 2021 Stein Rokkan Prize for Comparative Social Science Research for his book City, State: Constitutionalism and the Megacity.

== Selected publications ==
The following is a list of selected publications:

- Towards Juristocracy (Harvard University Press, 2004 & 2007); winner of the American Political Science Association (APSA) Law & Courts Section 2021 Lasting Contribution Award
- Constitutional Theocracy (Harvard University Press, 2010); winner of the 2011 Mahoney Prize in Legal Theory
- Comparative Matters: The Renaissance of Comparative Constitutional Law (Oxford University Press, 2014 & 2016); winner of the American Political Science Association 2015 C. Herman Pritchett Award for the Best Book on Law & Courts
- City, State: Constitutionalism and the Megacity (Oxford University Press, 2020); awarded the 2021 Stein Rokkan Prize for Comparative Social Science Research
