= Milada Anna Vachudová =

- Born: 1969 (age 56–57); Seattle, WA
- Known for: Author of Europe Undivided: Democracy, Leverage, and Integration After Communism
- Awards: Stein Rokkan Prize for Comparative Social Science Research (2006)

Academic background
- Education: Stanford University (BA); University of Oxford (PhM, PhD)

Academic work
- Discipline: Political science; European politics
- Institutions: University of North Carolina at Chapel Hill

Milada Anna Vachudová is an American political scientist of Czech origin, and has taught at the University of North Carolina at Chapel Hill since 2001.

== Early life ==
Milada Anna Vachudová was born and raised in the Seattle area to a Czech American family. Her family had fled from communist Czechoslovakia following the suppression of the Prague Spring in 1968. As a high school student, Vachudová spent a year studying in Angoulême in 1986 on a Rotary scholarship. After graduating from high school, she studied International Relations at Stanford University, earning a bachelor's degree in 1991. During the fall of the Berlin Wall in 1989, she travelled to Prague to witness the Velvet Revolution in Czechoslovakia, which sparked her interest in studying Eastern Europe.

After completing her bachelor's degree, Vachudová received a Marshall Scholarship to study at St Antony's College at the University of Oxford, where she attained a master of philosophy in European politics in 1993 and a doctorate of philosophy in international relations in 1997.

== Career ==
During her studies, Vachudová also taught at the Central European University in Prague from 1992 to 1993. She also held several fellowships and grants, including from the European University Institute, Center for European Studies in Harvard University, Center of International Studies at Princeton University, the National Science Foundation, and the National Council for Eurasian and East European Research.

In 2001, Vachudová was appointed assistant professor in the Department of Political Science at the University of North Carolina at Chapel Hill, and later promoted to associate professor in 2007 before becoming a professor in 2022.

In 2005, Vachudová published her book titled Europe Undivided: Democracy, Leverage and Integration After Communism focused on the process of European integration in post-communist states in Central and Eastern Europe.

From 2014 to 2019, Vachodova served as the chair of the Curriculum in Global Studies at UNC.

She is currently a core member of the Chapel Hill Expert Survey (CHES) focused on measuring the political positions of parties across Europe.

== Awards and recognition ==
In 2006, Vachudová was awarded the Stein Rokkan Prize for Comparative Social Science Research by the International Science Council and the European Consortium for Political Research for her book Europe Undivided: Democracy, Leverage, and Integration After Communism.
