= Kaare Strøm (political scientist) =

Norwegian political scientist

Kaare Strøm (born 10 April 1953) is a Norwegian political scientist.

He received his PhD from Stanford University in 1984, and is now a professor at the University of California, San Diego. He has also been a fellow at the University of Rochester in 1988, the Hoover Institution on War, Revolution and Peace from 1994 to 1995, the Rockefeller Center in Bellagio in 2001 and Stanford University from 2004 to 2005.

He won the Pi Sigma Alpha award for best paper at the American Political Science Association's conference in 1983, and in 1994 he won the Stein Rokkan Prize for Comparative Social Science Research. He is a member of the Norwegian Academy of Science and Letters, and the Royal Norwegian Society of Sciences and Letters.
