= Constitutional theocracy =

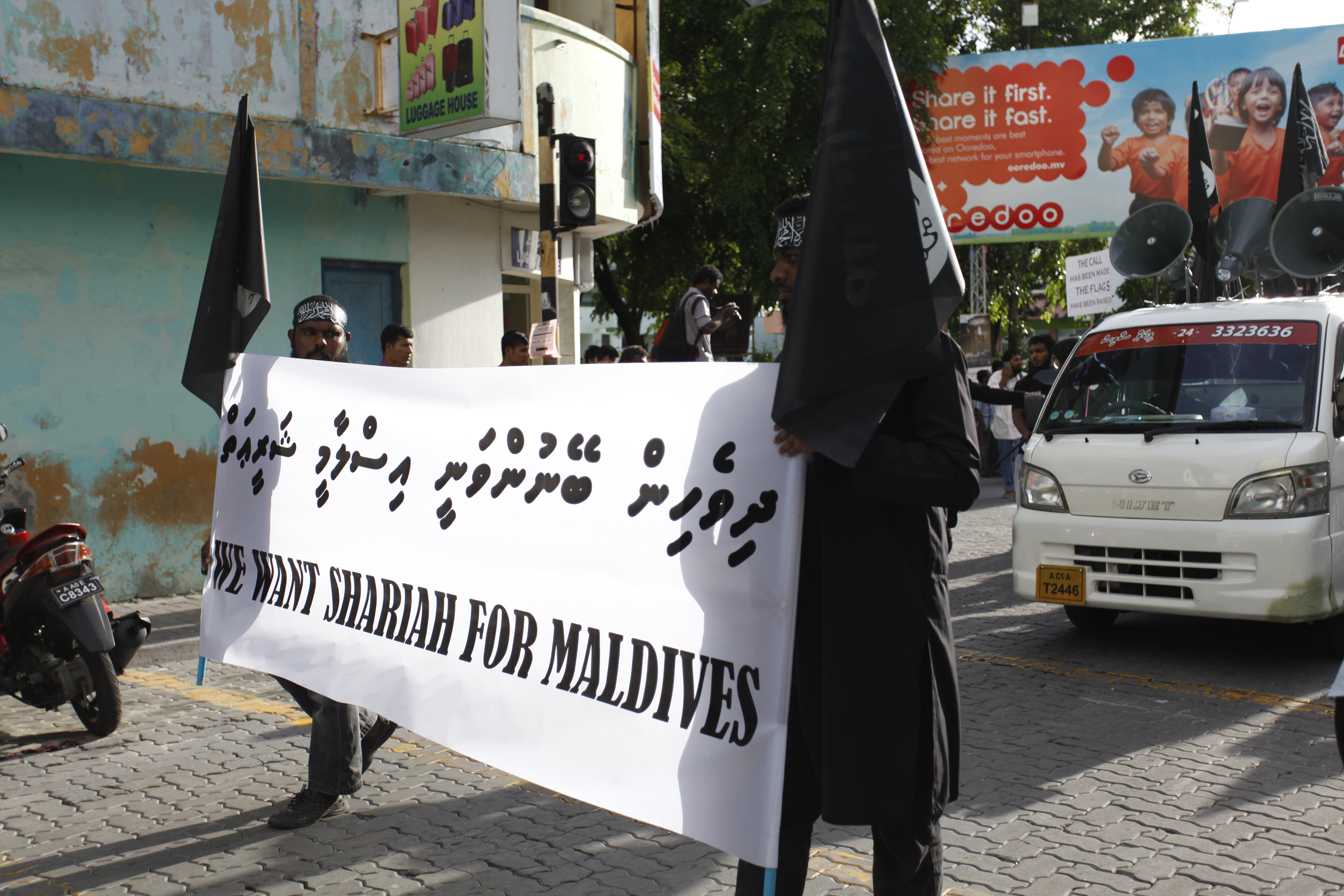

The phrase constitutional theocracy describes a form of elected government in which one single religion is granted an authoritative central role in the legal and political system. In contrast to a pure theocracy, power resides in lay political figures operating within the bounds of a constitution, rather than in the religious leadership.

The phrase was used in connection with the Iranian government of Ayatollah Khomeini in 1987 by Olivier Roy, and from the 1990s onward has been used in discussions of Iran, and occasionally of other governments. Professor Mahmood Mamdani has spoken of a "constitutional theocracy" in the context of "a state–wide clerical authority in Iran". Ran Hirschl of the University of Toronto law school has written more than one article discussing "constitutional theocracies": for example considering "modern states formally governed by principles of Islamic Shari'a laws".

The concept of constitutional theocracy is also used by journalists writing about Iran, or about the process of developing a constitution in Iraq, and in general discussions of the relationship between religion and government. Following its link with Iran's Islamic revolution, the phrase has also been used to discuss, among other topics, early twentieth-century Turkish politics and contemporary Chechnyan politics.

== Hirschl's views ==
Professor Hirschl has expanded on the distinction between constitutional theocracies and ordinary democracies in his article, Constitutional Courts vs. Religious Fundamentalism: Three Middle Eastern Tales. where he says:

The original text of Article 2 of the 1971 Egyptian Constitution read: 'Islam is the religion of the State, Arabic is its official language, and the principles of Islamic Shari’a are a principal source of legislation.' On May 22, 1980, the text of Article 2 was changed to read, 'Islam is the religion of the State, Arabic is its official language, and the principles of Islamic Shari’a are the principal source of legislation.' The result of this amendment effectively transformed Egypt into a 'constitutional theocracy,' in which no legislation could contravene Islamic legal principles.

Hirschl refers to the existence of official, government-established Shari’a courts in both Egypt and Iran as evidence that these are constitutional theocracies. Though his definition seems generally compatible with other views that a constitutional theocracy is a government using a single religion as its sole source of law, other writers do not mention Egypt as often as Iran in this context.
