= Charles C. Ragin =

American sociologist

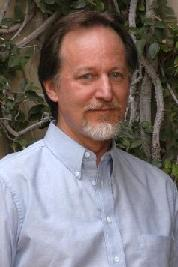
Charles C. Ragin

Charles C. Ragin (born c. 1952) is Chancellor's Professor of Sociology at the University of California, Irvine.

== Biography ==
Born c. 1952, Ragin graduated with a Bachelor of Arts degree in sociology from the University of Texas at Austin in May 1972. He completed his Doctor of Philosophy (PhD) degree in sociology from the University of North Carolina at Chapel Hill at age 22 in 1975.

After completing his PhD, Ragin joined the faculty at Indiana University Bloomington. He left Indiana University in 1981. He worked on the faculty of Northwestern University from 1981 to 2001. He was also a professor at the University of Oslo in Norway from 1998 to 2001. From 2001 through 2012, he was a professor of sociology and political science at the University of Arizona. He began his position as Chancellor's Professor at the University of California, Irvine in 2012.

== Sociological research ==
Ragin has made many contributions to sociology. He is a proponent of using fuzzy sets to bridge the divide between quantitative and qualitative methods. His main interests are methodology, political sociology, and comparative-historical research, with a special focus on such topics as the welfare state, ethnic political mobilization, and international political economy. He is also the author of more than 100 articles in research journals and edited books, and he has developed software packages for set theory analyses of social data, Qualitative Comparative Analysis (QCA) and fuzzy set Qualitative Comparative Analysis (fsQCA).

== Awards and honors ==
Ragin has been awarded the Stein Rokkan Prize of the International Social Science Council, the Donald Campbell Award for Methodological Innovation by the Policy Studies Organization, and received honorable mention for the Barrington Moore, Jr. Award of the American Sociological Association. He received the 2014 Paul F. Lazarsfeld Award, given by the American Sociological Association's Section on Methodology to recognize a career of outstanding contributions to sociological methodology. He has conducted academic workshops on methodology in Belgium, France, Germany, Italy, Japan, the Netherlands, Norway, South Korea, Switzerland, Taiwan, the United Kingdom, and for diverse audiences in the United States.

== Books published by Ragin ==
- Ragin, Charles C. Analytic Induction for Social Research. University of California Press 2023.
- Ragin, Charles C. & Peer C. Fiss. Intersectional Inequality: Race, Class, Test Scores and Poverty. University of Chicago Press 2017.
- Ragin, Charles C. & Becker, Howard. Qu'est-ce qu'un cas? Explorer les fondements de l'enquête en sciences sociales. Schwabe 2021.
- Ragin, Charles C. Redesigning Social Inquiry: Fuzzy Sets and Beyond. University of Chicago Press 2008.
- Ragin, Charles C. Fuzzy-Set Social Science. University Chicago Press 2000.
- Ragin, Charles C. & Larry Griffin. Formal Methods of Qualitative Analysis. (Edited Collection). Special Issue of Sociological Methods and Research 23, 1. (1994).
- Ragin, Charles C. Constructing Social Research: The Unity and Diversity of Method. Pine Forge Press 1994.
- Ragin, Charles C. What Is a Case? Exploring the Foundations of Social Inquiry. Cambridge University Press 1992.
- Ragin, Charles C. Issues and Alternatives in Comparative Social Research. E.J. Brill 1991.
- Ragin, Charles C. The Comparative Method: Moving Beyond Qualitative and Quantitative Strategies. University of California Press 1987.
