= European Political Science Review =

- Discipline: Political science; international relations
- Language: English
- Edited by: Carlos Closa; Matt Qvortrup

Publication details
- History: 2009–present
- Publisher: Cambridge University Press in conjunction with the European Consortium for Political Research (United Kingdom)
- Frequency: Quarterly
- Impact factor: 1.755 (2017)

Standard abbreviations
- ISO 4: Eur. Political Sci. Rev.

Indexing
- ISSN: 1755-7739 (print); 1755-7747 (web)
- LCCN: 2009207578
- OCLC no.: 319171599

Links
- Journal homepage; Online access; Online archive

European Political Science Review (EPSR) is a quarterly peer-reviewed academic journal published by Cambridge University Press in conjunction with the European Consortium for Political Research featuring scholarly research in political science. The journal covers not only European political issues, but also includes global issues and non-European topics. The joint editors-in-chief are Carlos Closa (Institute for Public Goods and Policies, Spanish National Research Council) and Matt Qvortrup (Coventry University).

== Abstracting and indexing ==
According to the Journal Citation Reports, the journal has a 2020 impact factor of 4.143, ranking it 25th out of 182 journals in the category "Political Science".

== See also ==
- List of political science journals
