= European Consortium for Political Research =

Scholarly association for political science

The European Consortium for Political Research (ECPR) is a scholarly association that supports and encourages the training, research and cross-national cooperation of many thousands of academics and graduate students specialising in political science and all its sub-disciplines. ECPR membership is institutional rather than individual and, at its inception in 1970, comprised eight members (Bergen, Gothenburg, Essex, Leiden, Mannheim, Nuffield College (Oxford), Strathclyde and Paris (FNSP)). Membership has now grown to encompass more than 320 institutions throughout the world.

ECPR has close links with similar organisations, including the American Political Science Association (APSA), European national associations and the International Political Science Association (IPSA).

== Activities ==
- Organising conferences, workshops and seminars at which scholars share original research
- Offering training in research methodologies for social sciences and related fields
- Publishing journals, books, and a blog site
- Supporting more than 70 special-interest research groups spanning a wide variety of political science subfields
- Providing a comprehensive information source for political scientists through the ECPR website and e-bulletins
- Offering funding schemes to progress individual careers and to support the discipline's wider development
- Recognising outstanding achievement in the discipline through prizes and awards

== Events ==
- General Conference
- Joint Sessions of Workshops
- Methods School
- House Series
- Events for Standing Groups and Research Networks

== Prizes and awards ==
- Cora Maas Award
- Dirk-Berg-Schlosser Award
- EPSR Early Careers Prize
- Hedley Bull Prize in International Relations
- Jacqui Briggs EPS Prize
- Jean Blondel PhD Prize
- Joni Lovenduski PhD Prize in Gender and Politics
- Lifetime Achievement Award
- Loop Best Blog Prize
- Mattei Dogan Foundation Prize
- Political Theory Prize
- Rising Star Award
- Rudolf Wildenmann Prize
- Stein Rokkan Prize for Comparative Social Science Research

== Publications ==
EJIR, EJPR, EPS, EPSR and PRX are peer-reviewed academic journals published by ECPR in conjunction with other academic publishers. Comparative Politics is a book series published in association with Oxford University Press. The Loop blog site is an ECPR publication.

- European Journal of International Relations (EJIR), with Sage
- European Journal of Political Research (EJPR), with Cambridge University Press
- European Political Science (EPS), with Cambridge University Press
- European Political Science Review (EPSR), with Cambridge University Press
- Political Research Exchange (PRX), with Routledge Taylor & Francis
- Comparative Politics Series, with Oxford University Press
- The Loop, ECPR's in-house political science blog

== ECPR Press ==
ECPR Press, ECPR's in-house book imprint, launched in 2005. Until 2024 it published original research across all fields of political science, international relations and political thought, without restriction in approach or regional focus. The Press was also open to interdisciplinary work with a predominant political dimension.

== Standing Groups and Research Networks ==
ECPR Standing Groups encourage collaboration between scholars specialising in the same subfields of research. Their informal structure allows closer exchange of ideas.

Membership of Groups and Networks is open to individuals working or studying at ECPR member institutions as well as those from non-member institutions.
