= Acta Politica =

Academic journal

- Discipline: Political science
- Language: English
- Edited by: Simon Otjes and Marc van de Wardt

Publication details
- History: 1965–present
- Publisher: Palgrave Macmillan on behalf of the Dutch Political Science Association
- Frequency: Quarterly
- Impact factor: 1.9 (2024)

Standard abbreviations
- ISO 4: Acta Polit.

Indexing
- ISSN: 0001-6810 (print); 1741-1416 (web)
- LCCN: sn86013405
- OCLC no.: 751038670

Links
- Journal homepage; Online access; Online archive; Ingentaconnect archive

Acta Politica is a quarterly peer-reviewed academic journal covering political science published by Palgrave Macmillan on behalf of the Dutch Political Science Association. The editors-in-chief are Simon Otjes (Leiden University) and Marc van de Wardt (Vrije Universiteit Amsterdam).

The journal covers such sub-areas as Dutch and comparative politics, as well as international relations, political theory, public administration and political communication.

== Abstracting and indexing ==
The journal is abstracted and indexed in International Bibliography of the Social Sciences, International Bibliography of Periodical Literature on the Humanities and Social Sciences, International Bibliography of Book Reviews of Scholarly Literature and Social Sciences, ProQuest databases, Scopus, Social Sciences Citation Index, CSA Sociological Abstracts, and CSA Worldwide Political Science Abstracts. According to the Journal Citation Reports, the journal has a 2020 impact factor of 2.404.
