= European Journal of Political Research =

- Discipline: political science, comparative politics
- Language: English

Publication details
- History: Formerly published: 1973 Amsterdam : Elsevier, 1973-1989. Dordrecht : Kluwer, 1989-2002. Wiley-Blackwell, 2002-2026. Cambridge University Press, 2026-current
- Publisher: Cambridge University Press (UK)
- Open access: Yes
- License: Creative Commons
- Impact factor: 3.432 (2025)

Standard abbreviations
- ISO 4: Eur. J. Political Res.
- NLM: Eur J Polit Res

Indexing
- CODEN: EJPRDY
- ISSN: 0304-4130 (print); 1475-6765 (web)
- LCCN: 74645044
- OCLC no.: 230744489

Links
- Journal homepage; Online access; Online archive

The European Journal of Political Research (EJPR) is a major journal of European political science sponsored by the European Consortium for Political Research (ECPR). It is one of the most highly respected journals in the discipline, and the first journal of the ECPR.

The EJPR specialises in articles articulating theoretical and comparative perspectives in political science, covering quantitative and qualitative approaches. All articles are subject to anonymised peer review. The Journal is currently edited by Alessandro Nai (University of Amsterdam) (Editor-in-Chief), Isabelle Borucki (Philipps-University Marburg), Nicole Curato (University of Birmingham), Caterina Froio (Sciences Po), Emilie van Haute (Université Libre de Bruxelles), Airo Hino (Waseda University), and Markus Wagner (University of Vienna).

== Ranking ==
According to the SCImago Journal Rank, the journal has a 2025 impact factor of 3.432, ranking it 18th out of 1513 journals in "Sociology and Political Science". In 2008 and 2014, it was ranked by the SCImago Journal Rank 48th and 26th, respectively in the Sociology and Political Science category.

== See also ==
- List of political science journals
