= Issue Yield =

Issue yield theory

In political science, Issue Yield refers to Issue Yield theory or its derived Issue Yield index.

== Issue Yield theory ==
Issue Yield theory was developed to explain party strategy and voting behavior in democratic elections. The theory focuses on the electoral risks and opportunities that specific policy issues present to political parties or candidates. The risk-opportunity mix of an issue (its "issue yield") gives incentives or disincentives to each party to emphasize that particular issue in their policy platform and election campaigns. Voters embrace these issue priorities and update their party support in line with their own policy preferences. Overall, by bringing together party strategy and voting behavior, Issue Yield theory seeks to account for the development of public policy and its variation among democratic societies.

According to the theory, high-yield issue goals are those that combine three characteristics:

- the party's existing voters agree (almost unanimously) on the issue goal, thus minimizing risks of internal division;
- a large share of the general electorate also agrees on the issue goal, thus maximizing opportunities for electoral expansion;
- the party is considered credible to achieve the goal, both within the party and by the general electorate.

If these conditions are fulfilled, the issue goal presents a win-win situation, allowing electoral expansion outside the party without losing existing voters.

Issue Yield theory was first presented in an article that appeared in the American Political Science Review in 2014; a simpler presentation (also framing the theory vis-à-vis other theoretical frameworks on the topic) was later published as an entry of the Routledge Handbook of Elections, Voting Behaviour and Public Opinion.

== Issue Yield index ==
The three aforementioned characteristics have been combined in a summary Issue Yield index, ranging between +1 (highest possible yield) and -1 (lowest possible yield), that can be calculated with data from any public opinion survey that includes a vote intention (or vote choice) item and at least one item concerning respondents' positions on an issue.

The index is constructed on the basis of three aggregate quantities: i (the share of the sample that supports the issue goal), p (the share of the sample that supports the party) and f (the share of the sample that supports both). These quantities are combined in a nonlinear fashion:

${IY=\frac{f-ip}{p(1-p)}+\frac{i-p}{1-p}}$

For surveys that include specific measures of party credibility regarding an issue goal, a credibility-weighted measure has been developed that also takes into account cred (the share of issue goal supporters who consider the party credible on the issue goal) and intcred (the share considering the party credible on the issue goal among party supporters that also support the goal)

${IY=\frac{(f-ip)intcred}{p(1-p)}+\frac{(i-p)cred}{1-p}}$

== Empirical applications ==
The theory has been first applied to strategic choices of political parties, consistently showing that high-yield goals tend to receive significantly higher priority in party platforms and in party campaign communication, with Issue Yield-related considerations being more relevant than voters' general issue priorities.

In addition, the theory has been applied to explain individual-level party support, patterns of cabinet formation, social group campaign appeals and political inequality.

The theory also served as a foundation for the Issue Competition Comparative Project (ICCP), a research project that analyzed party competition in general elections of six West European countries (Austria, France, Germany, Italy, Netherlands, UK) in 2017-18. Results were presented in a special issue of West European Politics (later published as a book), with data publicly released as GESIS Study ZA7499. A later wave covered Spain (2019), Poland (2019), the United States (2020) and Germany (2021), as well as an ICCP item battery included in a general survey run in the Czech Republic (2021).

== Software tools ==
A free Stata add-on ADO file for calculating the Issue Yield index on survey datasets is available from the issueyield project.
