= History of the foreign relations of the United Kingdom =

The history of the foreign relations of the United Kingdom covers English, British, and United Kingdom's foreign policy from about 1500 to 2000. For the current situation since 2000 see foreign relations of the United Kingdom.

Britain from circa 1750 to the 1910s took pride in an unmatched economic base; comprising industry, finance, shipping and trade that largely dominated the globe. Foreign policy based on free trade (from the mid-1840s to the 1920s) kept the economy flourishing. The overseas First British Empire was devastated by the loss of the thirteen American colonies in a war when Britain had no major allies. The Second British Empire was built fresh in Asia and Africa and reached its zenith in the 1920s. Foreign policy made sure it was never seriously threatened. The Statute of Westminster granted effective independence to Britain's self governing Dominions in 1931. In the era of Pax Britannica, 1815 to 1914, The British dominated world trade, finance and shipping. In what historians call "The Imperialism of Free Trade", London had a strong political voice in many nations in Latin America and Asia. The Royal Navy was used to help suppress the African slave trade, and to reduce piracy.

A favoured diplomatic strategy against France before 1815 was subsidising the armies of continental allies, such as the Kingdom of Prussia, thereby turning London's enormous financial power to military advantage. After 1815 the British Empire was kept secure by reliance on the Royal Navy. It remained the most powerful fleet afloat with a vast network of bases across the globe. London ensured it was larger than the next two largest navies combined informally and then formally in 1889, coming into parlance as the Two-Power Standard, until the First World War.

== English foreign policy before 1700 ==
In 1500 the Kingdom of England had only a modest population (3.8 million) compared to its much larger rivals of France (15 million), Spain (6.5 million), and the Holy Roman Empire (17 million). It was three times larger than its naval rival, the Netherlands, and eight times larger than Scotland. The limited budget, limited ambitions on the continent, avoidance of alliances, and the protection afforded by the English Channel (despite Scotland) from foreign invasion combined to make foreign affairs less pressing for the British government before 1688. Nevertheless, under the stable autocracy that the destruction of much of the (traditionally antagonistic to the Crown) English aristocracy during the Wars of the Roses had gifted the Tudor dynasty, England found her coffers full (especially after the Dissolution of the Monasteries) and was able to weigh in as a third wheel on European balance of power as an effective player with her own agency. England threw her weight behind either the Habsburg Holy Roman Emperor or France depending on the political wind, in spite of French attempts to neutralise England with the Auld Alliance. England after Henry VIII settled into another period of relative weakness as the Crown focused on religious rebellions and an attempted alliance with Habsburg Spain by Mary Tudor, but her half sister Elizabeth returned the country to relative stability and therefore was again able to play the Continental powers against each other, funding the Dutch Revolt in the Eighty Years’ War against Spain and the Huguenots against Catherine de Medici's court in France. Scotland was neutralised when Mary Queen of Scots was forced out by her own nobility in 1568, and the last door to Continental English invasion was closed with the colonisation of Ireland in the 1590s. These thwarted the Spanish attempts to invade England, the most famous of which was the Spanish Armada of 1588, which laid the foundations for English naval predominance and colonial and mercantile competition in respectively the New World and Far East for resources with Spain and Portugal.

With the union of the Crowns of England and Ireland with the Crown of Scotland in 1603, the new “British” entity was able to continue exercising the role of auxiliary power tipping the scales against Spain or France, but the English aristocracy's resentment of the Stuart dynasty meant they could never be as absolutist in England as the Tudors, and from 1639 a series of rebellions in Ireland and Scotland forced the English crown into civil war with Parliament over taxation, royal prerogative and religious and social discontent, setting England out of Continental affairs for a generation.

The military (de jure Republican) Cromwell regime tried to assert itself against te now independent Dutch and Spain in 1651 and 1655, but military victories won with support from France (like at the Battle of the Dunes in 1658) were minor and the Restoration of Charles II in 1660 heralded no major improvements on England's position relative to under Cromwell. England nearly became a French auxiliary, as Louis XIV funded Charles II, and committed him to disastrous wars in the name of French interests against the Dutch and Spanish, which saw the Royal Navy challenged seriously. The accession of the even more pro-French James II in 1685 led to the Whigs (opponents to power of the crown) backing the Dutch stadholder William III's invasion.

=== Tudor foreign policy ===
King Henry VII (reigned 1485–1509) concentrated on establishing peace in England, especially against the threatened rebellions by the newly defeated House of York. Foreign affairs apart from Scotland were not a high priority. Scotland was an independent country, and peace was agreed to in 1497. Much of his diplomacy involved treaties for marriages with ruling houses in Europe. He married his eldest daughter Margaret Tudor to King James IV of Scotland in 1503. Henry tried to marry his daughter Mary to the man who later became Charles V, Holy Roman Emperor, but that fell through. Henry VIII finally married her to King Louis XII of France as part of a peace treaty in 1514; Louis died after three months and Henry demanded and got most of her dowry back. The other main diplomatic success of Henry VII was an alliance with Spain, sealed by the marriage in 1501 of his heir Arthur, Prince of Wales, to Catherine of Aragon, Infanta of Spain (second daughter of King Ferdinand II of Aragon and Queen Isabella I of Castile). When his Queen died in 1503, Henry VII searched the European marriage market for a diplomatic marriage with a large dowry for himself, but was unable to find a match.

Arthur died in 1502 and the second son married the widow in 1509, just after he became king as Henry VIII.

==== Henry VIII ====
King Henry VIII (reigned 1509–1547) paid special attention to expanding the English Navy, to protect the rapidly expanding merchant fleet. He also commissioned privateers from the merchant fleets to act as auxiliary warships that captured and resold enemy merchant ships. Some of his foreign and religious policy revolved around annulling his marriage to Catherine of Aragon in 1533 despite the opposition of Pope Clement VII — his solution was to remove the Church of England from the pope's authority, thereby launching the English Reformation.

In 1510, France, with a fragile alliance with the Holy Roman Empire in the League of Cambrai, was winning a war against the Republic of Venice. Henry renewed his father's friendship with Louis XII of France, and signed a pact with his father-in-law King Ferdinand of Spain. After Pope Julius II created the anti-French Holy League in October 1511, Henry followed Spain's lead and brought England into the new League. An initial joint Anglo-Spanish attack was planned for the spring to recover Aquitaine for England, the start of making Henry's dreams of ruling France a reality. The attack failed and it strained the Anglo-Spanish alliance. Nevertheless, the French were pushed out of Italy soon after, and the alliance survived, with both parties keen to win further victories over the French.

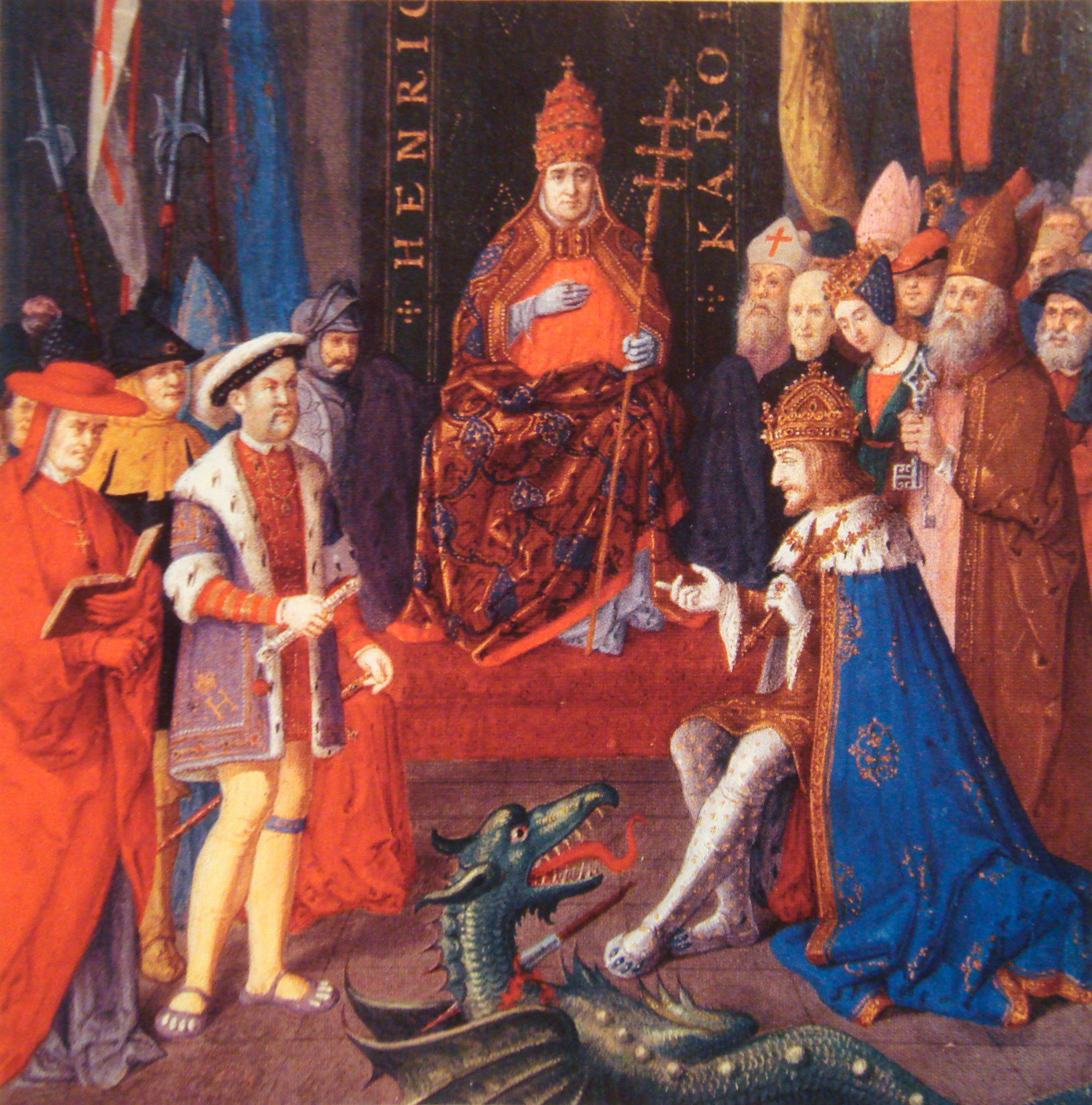
Henry with Charles V, Holy Roman Emperor (right) and Pope Leo X (centre), c. 1520

On 30 June 1513, Henry invaded France, and his troops defeated a French army at the Battle of the Spurs – a relatively minor result, but one which was seized on by the English for propaganda purposes. Soon after, the English took Thérouanne and handed it over to Maximillian; Tournai, a more significant settlement, followed. Henry had led the army personally, complete with large entourage. His absence from the country, however, had prompted James IV of Scotland, to invade England at the behest of Louis. The English army, overseen by Queen Catherine, decisively defeated the Scots at the Battle of Flodden on 9 September 1513, in which James IV and many senior Scottish nobles died.

Charles V ascended the thrones of both Spain and the Holy Roman Empire following the deaths of his grandfathers, Ferdinand in 1516 and Maximilian in 1519. Francis I likewise became king of France upon the death of Louis in 1515, leaving three relatively young rulers and an opportunity for a clean slate. The careful diplomacy of Cardinal Thomas Wolsey had resulted in the Treaty of London in 1518, an early non-aggression pact among the major kingdoms of western Europe. In a significant follow-up, Henry met Francis I on 7 June 1520 at the Field of the Cloth of Gold near Calais for a fortnight of lavish and extremely expensive entertainment. Charles brought his Holy Roman Empire into war with France in 1521; Henry offered to mediate, but little was achieved and by the end of the year Henry had aligned England with Charles. He still clung to his previous aim of restoring English lands in France, but also sought to secure an alliance with Burgundy, then part of Charles' realm, and the continued support of Charles. Charles defeated and captured Francis at Pavia and could dictate peace; but he believed he owed Henry nothing. Henry had repeatedly raised taxes to pay for his foreign operations until upscale passive resistance in 1525 forced the ending of the newest tax known as the "Amicable Grant." Lack of money ended Henry's plans for an invasion of France and he took England out of the war with the Treaty of the More on 30 August 1525.

==== New World ====
In 1497 Henry VII commissioned the Italian mariner John Cabot who had settled in England, to explore the New World. Cabot was the first European since the Norsemen to reach parts of what is now Canada, exploring from Newfoundland to as far south as Delaware. He found no gold or spices and the king lost interest. Colonisation was not a high priority for the Tudors, who were much more interested in raiding the Spanish treasure ships than in acquiring their own colonies.

==== Treasure crisis of 1568 ====
The "Treasure crisis" of 1568 was Queen Elizabeth I's seizure of gold from Spanish treasure ships in English ports in November 1568. Chased by privateers in the English channel, five small Spanish ships carrying gold and silver worth 400,000 florins (£85,000) sought shelter in English harbors. The money was bound for the Netherlands as payment for Spanish soldiers who were fighting rebels there. Queen Elizabeth discovered that the gold was not owned by Spain, but was still owned by Italian bankers. She decided to seize it, and treated as a loan from the Italian bankers to England. The bankers agree to her terms, so Elizabeth had the money and she eventually repaid the bankers. Spain reacted furiously, and seized English property in the Netherlands and Spain. England reacted by seizing Spanish ships and properties in England. Spain reacted by imposing an embargo preventing all English imports into the Netherlands. The bitter diplomatic standoff lasted for four years. However neither side wanted war. In 1573, the Convention of Nymegen was a treaty where England promised to end support for raids on Spanish shipping by English privateers such as Francis Drake and John Hawkins. It was finalized in the Convention of Bristol in August, 1574 in which both sides paid for what they had seized. Trade resumed between England and Spain and relations improved.

===== Armada =====
The Anglo-Spanish War (1585–1604) arose largely from religious differences; the execution of Catholic Mary, Queen of Scots in 1587 outraged Spain. War was never formally declared. Spain was militarily and financially much more powerful, and promoted a Catholic interest in opposition to England's Protestantism. The conflict saw widely separated battles, and began with England's military expedition in 1585 to the Spanish Netherlands (modern-day Belgium) in support of the resistance of the States General to Spanish Habsburg rule. The English enjoyed a modest victory by "Singeing the King of Spain's Beard" in 1587 at Cádiz, the main port in Spain. The raid led by Francis Drake destroyed numerous merchant ships and captured some treasure. The great English triumph was the decisive defeat of the Spanish invasion attempt by the ill-fated Spanish Armada in 1588. After Elizabeth died in 1603, the new king made peace a high priority and ended the long-simmering conflict in 1604.

=== Stuart foreign policy ===
By 1600 the conflict with Spain became deadlocked during campaigns in Brittany and Ireland. James I, the new king of England, made peace with the new King of Spain, Philip III with the Treaty of London in 1604. They agreed to cease their military interventions in the Spanish Netherlands and Ireland, respectively, and the English ended high seas privateering against Spanish merchant ships. King James I (reigned 1603–25) was sincerely devoted to peace, not just for his three kingdoms, but for Europe as a whole. He called himself "Rex Pacificus" ("King of peace.") Europe was deeply polarized, and on the verge of the massive Thirty Years' War (1618–1648), with the smaller established Protestant states facing the aggression of the larger Catholic empires. On assuming the throne, James made peace with Catholic Spain, and made it his policy to marry his son to the Spanish Infanta (princess) in the "Spanish Match". The marriage of James' daughter Princess Elizabeth to Elector Frederick V of the Palatinate on 14 February 1613 had important political and military implications. Across Europe, the German princes were banding together in the Union of German Protestant Princes, headquartered in Heidelberg, the capital of the Palatine. King James calculated that his daughter's marriage would give him diplomatic leverage among the Protestants. He thus planned to have a foot in both camps and be able to broker peaceful settlements. In his naïveté, he did not realise that both sides were playing him as a tool for their own goal of achieving destroying the other side.

Lord Buckingham (1592–1628), who increasingly was the actual ruler of Britain, wanted an alliance with Spain. Buckingham took Charles with him to Spain to woo the Infanta in 1623. However, Spain's terms were that James must drop Britain's anti-Catholic intolerance. Buckingham and Charles were humiliated and Buckingham became the leader of the widespread British demand for a war against Spain. Meanwhile, the Protestant princes looked to Britain, since it was the strongest of all the Protestant countries, to give military support for their cause. His son-in-law and daughter became king and queen of Bohemia, which outraged Vienna. The Thirty Years' War began, as the Habsburg Emperor ousted the new king and queen of Bohemia, and massacred their followers. Catholic Bavaria then invaded the Palatine, and James's son-in-law begged for James's military intervention. James finally realized his policies had backfired and refused these pleas. He successfully kept Britain out of the European-wide war. James's backup plan was to marry his son Charles to a French Catholic princess, who would bring a handsome dowry. Parliament and the British people were strongly opposed to any Catholic marriage, were demanding immediate war with Spain, and strongly favored with the Protestant cause in Europe. Historians credit James for pulling back from a major war at the last minute, and keeping Britain in peace.

The crisis in Bohemia in 1619, and the conflagration that resulted, marked the beginning of the disastrous Thirty Years' War. King James' determination to avoid involvement in the continental conflict, even during the "war fever" of 1623, appears in retrospect as one of the most significant, and most positive, aspects of his reign.

During 1600–1650 England made repeated efforts to colonize Guiana in South America. They all failed and the lands (Surinam) were ceded to the Dutch Empire in 1667.

King Charles I (1600-1649) gave Lord Buckingham command of the military expedition against Spain in 1625. It was a total fiasco with many dying from disease and starvation. He led another disastrous military campaign in 1627. Buckingham was hated and the damage to the king's reputation was irreparable. England rejoiced when he was assassinated in 1628 by John Felton.

==== Huguenots ====
As a major Protestant nation, England patronized and help protect Huguenots, starting with Queen Elizabeth in 1562. There was a small naval Anglo-French War (1627–1629), in which England supported the French Huguenots against King Louis XIII of France. London financed the emigration of many to England and its colonies around 1700. Some 40,000-50,000 settled in England, mostly in towns near the sea in the southern districts, with the largest concentration in London where they constituted about 5% of the total population in 1700. Many others went to the Thirteen Colonies, especially South Carolina. The immigrants included many skilled craftsmen and entrepreneurs who facilitated the economic modernization of their new home, in an era when economic innovations were transferred by people rather than through printed works. The British government ignored the complaints made by local craftsmen about the favoritism shown foreigners. The immigrants assimilated well in terms of using English, joining the Church of England, intermarriage and business success. They founded the silk industry in England.

In terms of impact on British foreign policy, a keen new interest in humanitarian intervention, intended to prevent foreign governments from punishing people for their religious beliefs was emerging during the early eighteenth century. In large part this new sensibility was based on the happy experience of protecting Huguenots in France and taking in many refugees who became very good citizens.

=== Anglo Dutch Wars ===
The Anglo-Dutch Wars were a series of three wars which took place between the English and the Dutch from 1652 to 1674. The causes included political disputes and increasing competition from merchant shipping. Religion was not a factor, since both sides were Protestant. The British in the first war (1652–54) had the naval advantage with larger numbers of more powerful "ships of the line" which were well suited to the naval tactics of the era. The British also captured numerous Dutch merchant ships. In the second war (1665–67) Dutch naval victories followed. This second war cost London ten times more than it had planned on, and the king sued for peace in 1667 with the Treaty of Breda. It ended the fights over "mercantilism" (that is, the use of force to protect and expand national trade, industry, and shipping.) Meanwhile, the French were building up fleets that threatened both the Netherlands and Great Britain. In the third war (1672–74), the British counted on a new alliance with France but the outnumbered Dutch outsailed both of them, and King Charles II ran short of money and political support. The Dutch gained domination of sea trading routes until 1713. The British gained the thriving colony of New Netherland, and renamed it New York.

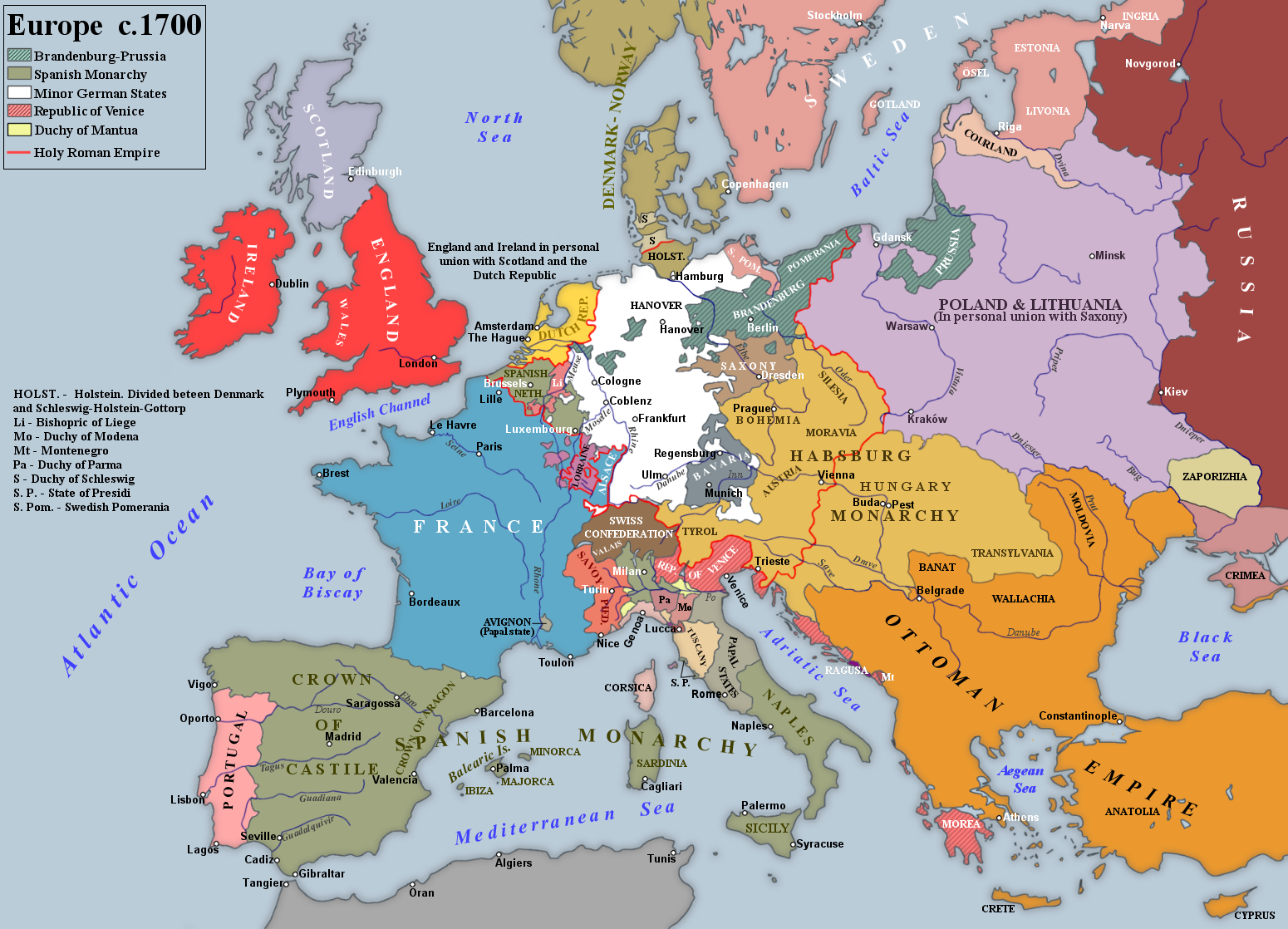
Europe in 1700; England and Ireland are in red.

=== William III: 1689–1702 ===
The primary reason the English Parliament called on William to invade England in 1688 was to overthrow King James II, and stop his efforts to reestablish Catholicism and tolerate Puritanism. However the primary reason William accepted the challenge was to gain a powerful ally in his war to contain the threatened expansion of King Louis XIV of France. William's goal was to build coalitions against the powerful French monarchy, protect the autonomy of the Netherlands (where William continued in power) and to keep the Spanish Netherlands (present-date Belgium) out of French hands. The English aristocracy was intensely anti—French, and customarily supported William's broad goals. For his entire career in Netherlands and Britain, William was the arch-enemy of Louis XIV. The Catholic King of France, in turn, denounced the Protestant William as a usurper who had illegally taken the throne from the legitimate Catholic King James II, and that he ought to be overthrown. In May 1689, William, now king of England, with the support of Parliament, declared war on France. Historian J.R. Jones states that King William was given:

supreme command within the alliance throughout the Nine Years' War. His experience and knowledge of European affairs made him the indispensable director of Allied diplomatic and military strategy, and he derived additional authority from his enhanced status as king of England – even the Emperor Leopold...recognized his leadership. William's English subjects played subordinate or even minor roles in diplomatic and military affairs, having a major share only in the direction of the war at sea. Parliament and the nation had to provide money, men and ships, and William had found it expedient to explain his intentions...but this did not mean that Parliament or even ministers assisted in the formulation of policy.

England and France were at war almost continuously until 1713, with a short interlude 1697–1701 made possible by the Treaty of Ryswick. The combined English and Dutch fleets could overpower France in a far-flung naval war, but France still had superiority on land. William wanted to neutralize that advantage by allying with Leopold I, the Habsburg Holy Roman Emperor (1658–1705), who was based in Vienna. Leopold, however, was tied down in war with the Ottoman Empire on his eastern frontiers; William worked to achieve a negotiated settlement between the Ottomans and the Empire. William displayed in imaginative Europe-wide strategy, but Louis always managed to come up with a counter play.

William was usually supported by the English leadership, which saw France as its greatest enemy. But eventually the expenses, and war weariness, caused second thoughts. At first, Parliament voted him the funds for his expensive wars, and for his subsidies to smaller allies. Private investors created the Bank of England in 1694; it provided a sound system that made financing wars much easier by encouraging bankers to loan money.

In the long-running Nine Years' War (1688–97) his main strategy was to form a military alliance of England, the Netherlands, the Holy Roman Empire, Spain, and some smaller states, to attack France at sea, and from land in different directions, while defending the Netherlands. Louis XIV tried to undermine this strategy by refusing to recognize William as king of England, and by giving diplomatic, military and financial support to a series of pretenders to the English throne, all based in France. William focused most of his attention on foreign policy and foreign wars, spending a great deal of time in the Netherlands (where he continued to hold the dominant political office). His closest foreign-policy advisers were Dutch, most notably William Bentinck, 1st Earl of Portland; they shared little information with their English counterparts. The net result was that the Netherlands remained independent, and France never took control of the Spanish Netherlands. The wars were very expensive to both sides but inconclusive. William died just as the continuation war, the War of the Spanish Succession, (1702–1714), was beginning. It was fought out during the reign of Queen Anne, and ended in a draw.

== Wars with France, 1702–1815 ==
=== Diplomatic service ===
After the Glorious Revolution of 1688, King William III handled foreign policy himself, using Dutch diplomats whenever possible, to bring English foreign policy and her resources and capital in line with his Dutch foreign policy in organising a “Grand Alliance” to oppose Louis XIV's European hegemonic ambitions (in the parlance of the time, “prevention to universal monarchy”). This set a precedent for British coordination of coalitions based on her flexible naval power, eclipsing traditional rivals like the Dutch and French over the course of the century, in turn based on an ease of raising money (the “sinews of power”) through creation of credit by government backed measures through the Bank of England, founded in 1694, allowed Britain to literally outspend her enemies and subsidise he allies.

From 1714, at the close of another long war to rein in Louis XIV, Britain built up the quantity of its diplomatic service. St. Petersburg and Berlin were upgraded to permanent embassy level representations towards the end of the century as the eastward shift of European balance of power politics from the rise of the Russian Empire and Prussia in the century as counterweights to traditional powers like Sweden and Austria respectively, with the British takeover of an adapted role in siding with whichever powers were opposing that most likely to be hegemonic, often (but not always) France until 1815. From 1715 to the mid-1730s Britain and France in fact enjoyed a period of cooperation after Louis XIV's death when the Anglophile Regent and Cardinal Fleury were in power, and the two countries cooperated against would-be hegemons like Bourbon Spain during the War of the Quadruple Alliance.

From their backing opposite factions to the Polish throne in the 1730s and with the outbreak of war with France allied to Bourbon Spain in 1744, Britain once again found France her main opponent, and entered a series of Alliances to prevent French destabilisation of the European continent, particularly the Low Countries, with their vital Barrier Fortresses of the Austrian Netherlands at the closest point to Kent. Political stability with fifty years of Whig domination (since the Tories had been embarrassed by the end of the War of Spanish Succession) also helped ensure a free hand for successive Whig foreign ministers like Lord Carteret and Newcastle, and eventually (de facto) William Pitt the Elder. Colonial policy was mostly subjugated to foreign policy, as trading counters for European concessions such as the fortress of Louisburg in New France in 1746 being traded for the Austrian Netherlands at the Treaty of Aix-la-Chapelle in 1748. On the whole, colonial possessions were valued mostly as economic drivers and means to European aims rather than as an aim in and of themselves, and therefore valued much less than European aims by British statesmen, with the exception of the opposition “blue-water” Tories, who came into power with the accession of George III.

War broke out intermittently with Spain and France, British diplomats working to secure deals with faraway potential allies like offering to broker deals with the intervention in the Holy Roman Empire election scheme in 1752 by foreign minister the Duke of Newcastle, whose attempt to ask Austria to cede territory in exchange for nebulous gains was refused and in fact led to a switch of alliances when an outraged Austria and France signed a treaty of Alliance, forcing Britain to take up with the former French ally Prussia in 1756.

The overwhelming victories of British arms in the corners of the globe meant that an overconfident Britain turned Tory in 1763 with the new King, George III, to abandon Continental commitments (like the alliance with Frederick the Great of Prussia, who was forced to sign a status quo peace) and strike out on an increasingly isolated and myopic foreign policy that antagonised potential allies instead of courting them, and all while abdicating her role as guarantor of the European balance of power by failing to prevent radical moves like the First Partition of Poland of 1772, allowing France to regain her strength by annexing Lorraine and Corsica without the usual British opposition. This meant that by the time of the American War of Independence, Britain was completely without the Continental partners who had allowed her to triumph over France and Spain in colonial wars previously, and only had mercenary states who rented their armies out like Hesse-Kassel and the personal union of Hanover to support her. British policy desperately tried seeking allies at last notice, such as offering to act as mediator of the War of Bavarian Succession in exchange for either Prussian or Austrian support against France, but Catherine the Great of Russia was concerned by the possible breakup of the anti-Polish coalition and the balance of Austro-Turkish power to form a League of Armed Neutrality directed against Britain to continue Britain's isolation, and desperate attempts to sell Minorca to Russia for an alliance also were unaccepted. In the end, Britain's new Whig administration under Lord Rockingham and Lord Shelbourne sued for peace following Lord North and thé Tories resigning.

The new Whig administration rebuilt British diplomatic credibility, with Britain invited by Continental powers who saw it in their interest to ally with a Britain recommitted to European affairs, such as the Dutch Republic (at war with Britain as recently as 1780-84) and Prussia, who formed a triple alliance after Frederick's death in 1786 to oppose the French~backed Patriot party in the Netherlands, but the French Revolution threw traditional European diplomacy into disarray, and William Pitt the Younger up an underground intelligence service that was in contact with local dissidents, and helped shape their protests. William Pitt the Younger, the Prime Minister during much of the French Revolutionary period, was saddled with the largely incompetent Foreign Secretary, Francis Osborne, 5th Duke of Leeds, from 1783 to 1791. However Pitt managed to bring in numerous strong diplomats, such as James Harris at The Hague, where he forged an alliance that with the addition of Prussia became a triple alliance in 1788. Pitt often used him as a troubleshooter in complex negotiations. Pitt brought in William Eden (1744–1814), who had negotiated a difficult commercial treaty with France in 1786.

Pitt brought on board three foreign ministers with strong reputations. William Grenville (1791–1801) saw revolutionary France as a profound threat to every nation in Europe, and he focused his attention on its defeat, working closely with his cousin Pitt. George Canning (1807–9), and Viscount Casterleagh (1812–15) were highly successful in organizing complex coalitions that in the end defeated Napoleon. Castlereagh to Canning displayed imagination and energy, although their personalities clashed to the point of fighting a duel. Britain was in her prime (with the exception of a period after Pitt resigned, of pacifism under Lord Addington when Britain sued for peace in 1801-02) during the Revolutionary and Napoleonic Wars, funding six coalition wars back to back that tore Napoleon's forces across two thousand miles of fronts, from Portugal to Moscow. Almost every European country was subsidised and assisted by Britain at some point between 1793 and 1815, most consistently Austria, Prussia, Russia, Spain (after 1808), Portugal, and Sweden.

=== Britain as a naval and maritime power ===
Britain's leaders realized the value of the increasingly powerful Royal Navy, and made sure that in various treaties it added naval bases and obtained access to key ports. In the Mediterranean region, it controlled Gibraltar and Minorca, and had advantageous positions in Naples and Palermo. The alliance with Portugal concluded in 1703 protected its approaches to the Mediterranean. In the North, Hanover played a role (it was ruled by the English king), while the alliance with Denmark provided naval access to the North Sea and the Baltic. Meanwhile, French maritime power was weakened by the Treaty of Utrecht which forced it to destroy its naval base in Dunkirk. English maritime power was boosted by a series of commercial treaties, including those of 1703 with Portugal, with the Netherlands, Savoy, Spain and France in 1713. Although the merchants of London had little direct say at the royal court, the king appreciated their contribution to the wealth of his kingdom, and to his tax base.

=== 1701–1712 – War of the Spanish Succession ===
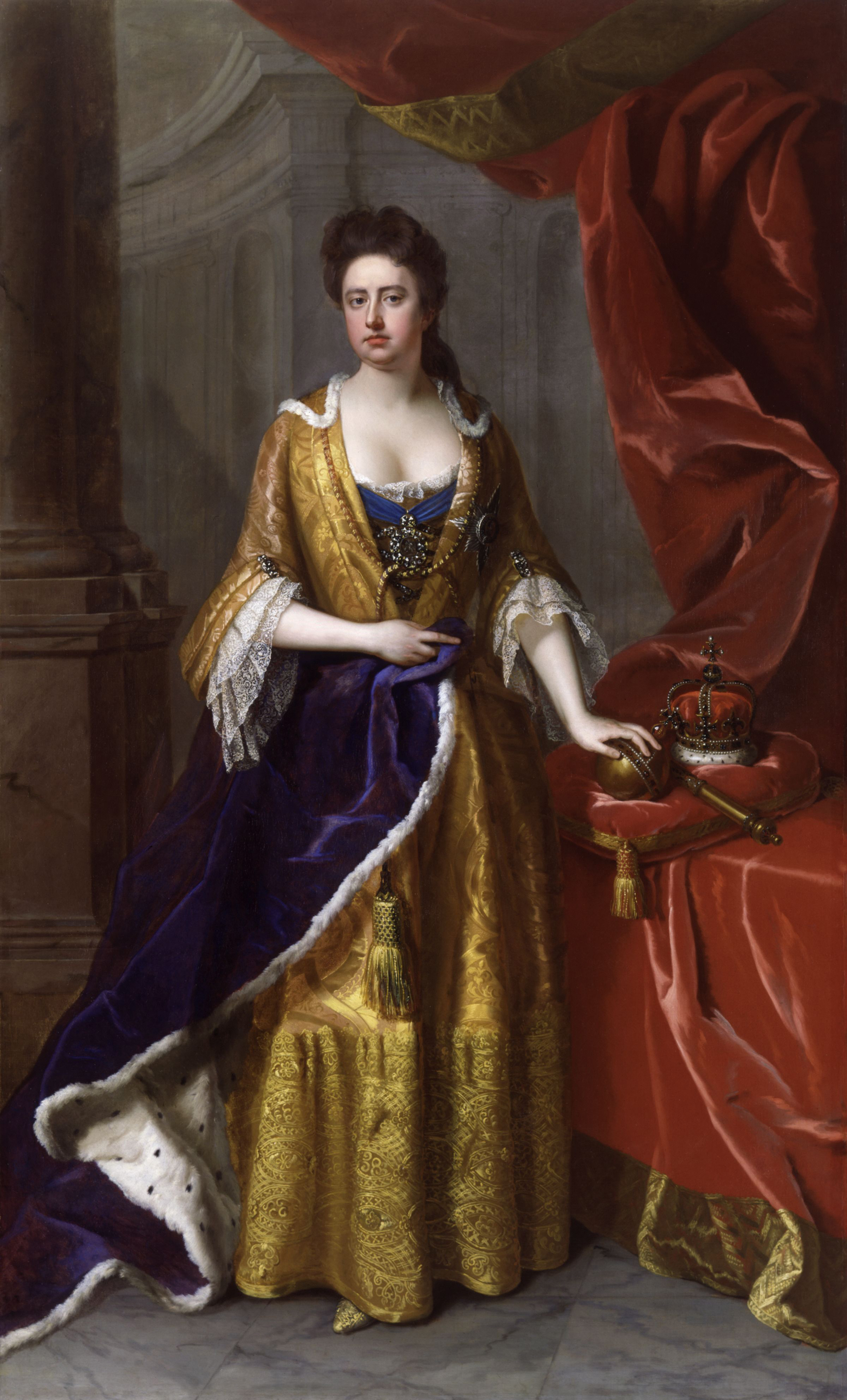
Queen Anne

Britain was a player in the first world war of modern times with theatres of fighting in Spain, Italy, Germany, Holland, and at sea. At issue was the threat of a French-sponsored Bourbon heir as king of Spain, that would allow the Bourbon kings of France to take control of Spain and its American empire.

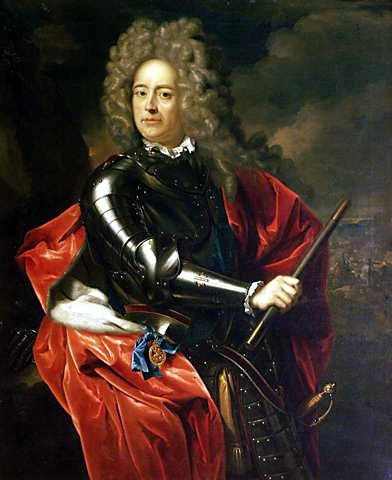
John Churchill, Duke of Marlborough

Queen Anne relied on an experienced team of experts, generals, diplomats, cabinet members, and War Office officials—most notably her most successful general John Churchill, 1st Duke of Marlborough. He is best known for his great victory at the Battle of Blenheim in 1704. In 1706 he defeated the French at the Battle of Ramillies, captured their garrisons, and drove the French out of most of the Spanish Netherlands. The Royal Navy with an assist from the Dutch in 1704-5 captured Gibraltar, which ever since has been the key to British power in the Mediterranean. The war dragged on and on, and neither France nor England could afford the mounting expenses, so a compromise solution was finally reached in the Treaty of Utrecht that protected most of England's interests; the French abandoned their long-term claim that the Old Pretender was the true King of England. Utrecht marked the end of French ambitions of hegemony in Europe expressed in the wars of Louis XIV, and preserved the European system based on the balance of power. British historian G. M. Trevelyan argues:

That Treaty, which ushered in the stable and characteristic period of Eighteenth-Century civilization, marked the end of danger to Europe from the old French monarchy, and it marked a change of no less significance to the world at large, — the maritime, commercial and financial supremacy of Great Britain.

England resolved its long-standing problem with Scotland in the Acts of Union 1707, which integrated Scotland into the British political and economic system. The much smaller Scotland kept its traditional political elite, its established Presbyterian church, its superior universities, and its distinctive legal system. The War of the Spanish Succession had again emphasized the danger of an independent Scotland in alliance with France as the dagger aimed at England. Awareness of the danger had helped to determine the timing, manner and consequences of union, and Scots began to play major roles in British intellectual life, and in providing diplomats, merchants, and soldiers for the emerging British Empire.

=== 1742–48, – War of the Austrian Succession ===
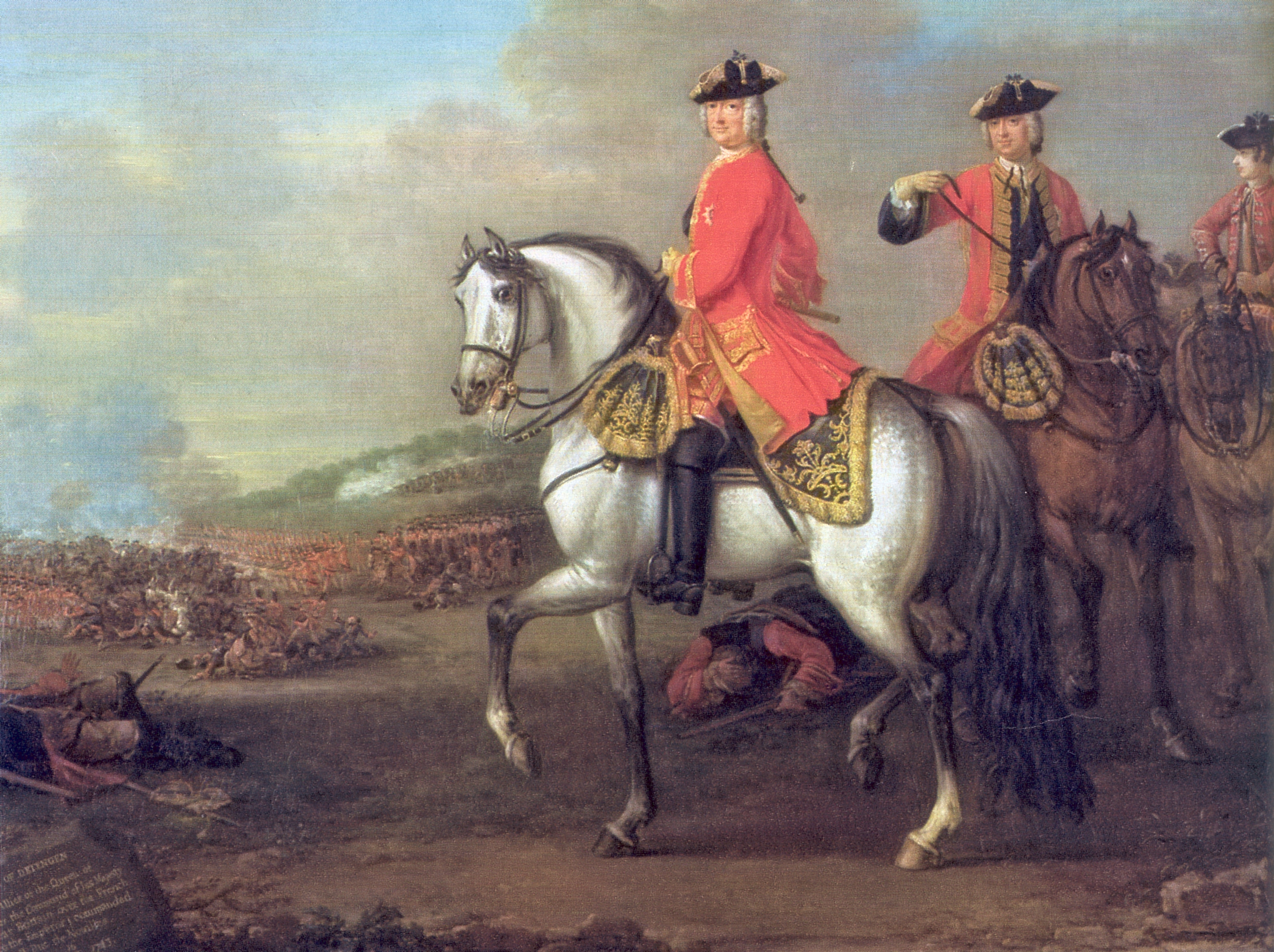
George II leading his troops at Dettingen, the last occasion on which a British King led his troops into battle

Britain played a small role in the inconclusive but hard fought war that convulsed central Europe, while funding its ally Austria. The goal, as defined by foreign minister John Carteret was to limit the growth of French power, and protect the Electorate of Hanover, which was also ruled by King George II. In 1743 King George II led a 40,000-man British-Dutch-German army into the Rhine Valley. He was outmaneuvered by the French Royal Army but he scored a narrow victory at the Battle of Dettingen. In the winter of 1743–44 the French planned to invade Britain in alliance with the Stuart pretender to George's throne; they were foiled by the Royal Navy. King George gave command to his son the Duke of Cumberland. He fared poorly and Britain pulled out of the war to deal with rebellion at home, where Cumberland gained fame by decisively suppressing the Jacobite Rising at the Battle of Culloden in 1746. Meanwhile, Britain did much better in North America, capturing the powerful Fortress of Louisbourg in Nova Scotia. The Treaty of Aix-la-Chapelle (1748) favoured France, which won the most victories. Britain returned the Fortress of Louisbourg to France and the French left the Austrian Netherlands (modern Belgium). Prussia and Savoy were the main winners, and Britain's ally Austria was a loser. The treaty left the main issues of control over territories in America and India unresolved, and was little more than an armed truce, and a prelude to the more important Seven Years' War.

=== 1754–1763 – Seven Years' War ===
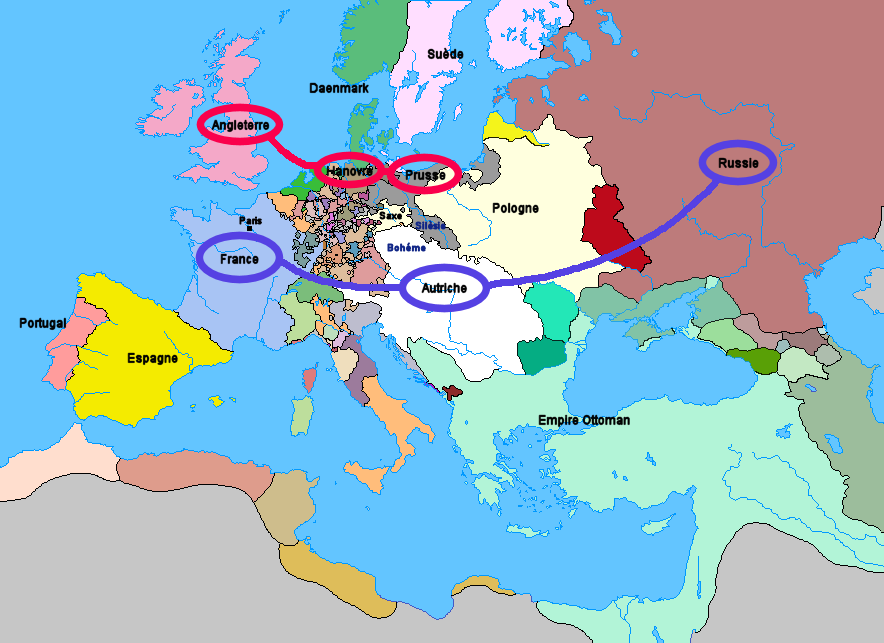
The new alliances formed as a result of the Diplomatic Revolution of 1756; Austria switched from a British ally to a French ally; Prussia became a British ally.

The Seven Years' War (1756–1763 in Europe, 1754–1763 in North America) was a major international conflict centered in Europe but reaching across the globe. Great Britain and Prussia were the winners over France, Austria, Spain and Russia. Britain swept up much of the overseas French Empire in North America and India. The financing of war was a critical issue, which Britain handled well, and France handled poorly, leaving itself so deep in debt that it never fully recovered. William Pitt energized the British leadership, and used effective diplomacy and military strategy to achieve his victory. Britain used the manpower from its American colonies effectively in cooperation with its regulars and its Navy to overwhelm the much less populous French colonial empire in what is now Canada. From a small spark in 1754 the fighting spread to Europe. 1759, was the "annus mirabilis" ("miraculous year"), with victory after victory. British and Prussian troops defeated the French army at the Battle of Minden, the British captured Guadeloupe Island and Quebec, smashed the French fleet at Quiberon Bay, and (in January 1760) defeated the French in southern India. Peace terms were hard to reach and the war dragged on until everyone was exhausted. The British national debt soared to £134 million from £72 million, but London had a financial system capable of handling the burden. Britain now had complete control of the colonies that became Canada and the United States.

=== 1775–1783 – American War of Independence ===
==== Neutrals ====
Britain's diplomacy failed in this world-wide war—it had support of only a few small German states that hired out mercenaries. Nearly all of Europe was officially neutral, but the elites and public opinion typically favoured the underdog American Patriots. and Denmark.

The League of Armed Neutrality was an alliance of minor European naval powers between 1780 and 1783 which was intended to protect neutral shipping against the Royal Navy's wartime policy of unlimited search of neutral shipping for French contraband. By the end of the war in 1783 Prussia, the Holy Roman Empire, the Netherlands, Portugal, the Kingdom of the Two Sicilies and the Ottoman Empire had all become members. The League never fought a battle. Diplomatically, it carried greater weight; France and the United States were quick to proclaim their adherence to the new principle of free neutral commerce. Britain—which did not—still had no wish to antagonize Russia, and avoided interfering with the allies' shipping. While both sides of the Fourth Anglo-Dutch War tacitly understood it as an attempt to keep the Netherlands out of the League, Britain did not officially regard the alliance as hostile.

=== William Pitt the Younger ===
As prime minister (1783–1801, 1804–1806) William Pitt the Younger reinvigorated the administrative system of Great Britain, modernized its finances, and led the way in breaking out of the diplomatic isolation, it found itself during the American war.

From 1700 to 1850, Britain was involved in 137 wars or rebellions. It maintained a large and expensive Royal Navy, along with a small standing army. When the need arose for soldiers it hired mercenaries or financed allies who fielded armies. The rising costs of warfare forced a shift in government financing from the income from royal agricultural estates and special imposts and taxes to reliance on customs and excise taxes and, after 1790, an income tax. Working with bankers in the City, the government raised large loans during wartime and paid them off in peacetime. The rise in taxes amounted to 20% of national income, but the private sector benefited from the increase in economic growth. The demand for war supplies stimulated the industrial sector, particularly naval supplies, munitions and textiles, which gave Britain an advantage in international trade during the postwar years. Pitt in the 1780s reformed the fiscal system by raising taxes, monitoring expenses closely, and establishing a sinking fund to pay off the long-term debt, which amounted to £243 million, with annual interest accounting for most of the budget. Meanwhile, the banking system used its ownership of the debt to provide capital assets for economic growth. When the wars with France began, the debt reached £359 million in 1797 and Pitt kept the sinking fund in operation and raised taxes, especially on luxury items. Britain was far ahead of France and all other powers in its use of finance to strengthen the economy, the military and foreign policy.

=== Nootka crisis with Spain, 1789–1795 ===
The Nootka Crisis was a crisis with Spain starting in 1789 at Nootka Sound, an unsettled area at the time that is now part of British Columbia. Spain seized British ships engaged in the fur trade in an area on the Pacific Ocean in a zone where Spain claimed ownership. Britain rejected the Spanish claims and used its greatly superior naval power to threaten a war and win the dispute. The dispute was settled by negotiations in 1792–94, which became friendly when Spain switched sides in 1792 and became an ally of Britain against France. Spain surrendered to Britain many of its trade and territorial claims in the Pacific, ending a two-hundred-year monopoly on Asian-Pacific trade. The outcome was a victory for mercantile interests of Britain and opened the way to British expansion in the Pacific.

=== Crisis with Russia 1791 ===
Pitt was alarmed at Russian expansion in Crimea in the 1780s at the expense of his Ottoman ally, and tried to get Parliamentary support for reversing it. In peace talks with the Ottomans, Russia refused to return the key Ochakov fortress. Pitt wanted to threaten military retaliation. However Russia's ambassador Semyon Vorontsov swayed Pitt's enemies and launched a successful public opinion campaign. Pitt won the vote so narrowly that he gave up and Vorontsov secured a renewal of the commercial treaty between Britain and Russia.

=== French Revolutionary Wars 1792–1803 ===
The French Revolution broke out in 1789 and polarized British political opinion, with the dominant conservatives outraged at killing of the king, the expulsion of the nobles, and the Reign of Terror. Britain was at war against France almost continuously from 1793 until the final defeat of Napoleon in 1815. The goal was to stop the spread of revolutionary and democratic ideas, and to prevent France from controlling Western Europe. William Pitt the Younger was the dominant leader until his death in 1806. Pitt's strategy was to mobilize and fund the coalition against France. It seemed too hard to attack France on the continent so Pitt decided to seize France's valuable colonies in the West Indies and India. At home, a minority pro-French element carried little weight with the British government. Conservatives castigated every radical opinion as "Jacobin" (in reference to the leaders of the Terror), warning that radicalism threatened an upheaval of British society.

- 1791–92: London rejects intervention in French Revolution. Its policy is based on realism not ideology and seek to avoid French attacks on the Austrian Netherlands; to not worsen the fragile status of King Louis XVI; and to prevent formation of a strong Continental league.
- 1792–1797: War of the First Coalition: Prussia and Austria joined after 1793 by Britain, Spain, the Netherlands, Sardinia, Naples, and Tuscany against French Republic.
- 1792: Austria and Prussia invade France. The French defeat the invaders and then go on the offensive by invading the Austria Netherlands (modern Belgium) in late 1792. This causes grave tension with Britain as it was British policy to ensure that France could not control the "narrow seas" by keeping the French out of the Low Countries.
- 1792: In India, victory over Tipu Sultan in Third Anglo-Mysore War; cession of one half of Mysore to the British and their allies.
- 1793: France declares war on Britain.
- 1794: Jay Treaty with the United States normalizes trade and secures a decade of peace. The British withdraws from forts in Northwest Territory but maintain support of tribes hostile to the U.S. France is angered at the close relationship, and denounces the Jay Treaty as a violation of its 1777 treaty with the U.S.
- 1802–03: Peace of Amiens allows 13 months of peace with France.

== Napoleonic Wars, 1803–1815 ==
Britain ended the uneasy truce created by the Treaty of Amiens when it declared war on the First French Empire in May 1803. The British were increasingly angered by Napoleon's reordering of the international system in Western Europe, especially in Switzerland, Germany, Italy and the Netherlands.

Britain had a sense of loss of control, as well as loss of markets, and was worried by Napoleon's possible threat to its overseas colonies. Frank McLynn argues that Britain went to war in 1803 out of a "mixture of economic motives and national neuroses – an irrational anxiety about Napoleon's motives and intentions." McLynn concludes that in the long run it proved to be the right choice for Britain, because in the long run Napoleon's intentions were hostile to the British national interest. Napoleon was not ready for war and so this was the best time for Britain to stop them. Britain seized upon the Malta issue, refusing to follow the terms of the Treaty of Amiens and evacuate the island.

The deeper British grievance was their perception that Napoleon was taking personal control of Europe, making the international system unstable, and forcing Britain to the sidelines.

=== Decisive roles ===
Historian G. M. Trevelyan argues that British diplomacy under Lord Castlereagh played a decisive role:

In 1813 and 1814 Castlereagh played the part that William III and Marlborough had played more than a hundred years before, in holding together an alliance of jealous, selfish, weak-kneed states and princes, by a vigour or character and singleness of purpose that held Metternich, the Czar and the King of Prussia on the common track until the goal was reached. It is quite possible that, but for the lead taken by Castlereagh in the allied counsels, France would never have been reduced to her ancient limits, nor Napoleon dethroned.

- 1803–1815: Napoleonic Wars against France
- 1803–1806: War of the Third Coalition: Napoleon terminates the Holy Roman Empire.
- 1803: By the Anglo-Russian agreement, Britain pays a subsidy of £1.5 million pounds for every 100,000 Russian soldiers in the field. Subsidies also went to Austria and other allies.
- 1804: Pitt organized the Third Coalition against Napoleon; it last until 1806 and was marked by mostly French victories
- 1805: Decisive defeat of the French navy at the Battle of Trafalgar by Nelson; end of invasion threats
- 1806–07: Britain leads the Fourth Coalition in alliance with Prussia, Russia, Saxony, and Sweden. Napoleon leads France to victory at numerous major battles, notably Battle of Jena–Auerstedt)
- 1807: Britain makes the international slave trade criminal; Slave Trade Act 1807; US prohibits the importation of new slaves (Act Prohibiting Importation of Slaves)
- 1808–1814: Peninsular War against Napoleonic forces in Spain; result is victory under the Duke of Wellington
- 1812–1815: US declares War of 1812 over national honour, neutral rights at sea, British support for western Indians.
- 1813: Napoleon was defeated at Battle of Leipzig; he retreats.
- 1814: France invaded; Paris falls; Napoleon abdicates and Congress of Vienna convenes
- 1814: Anglo-Nepalese War (1814–1816)
- 1815: With the War of 1812 against the U.S. a military draw, the British abandon their First Nation allies and agree at the Treaty of Ghent to restore the prewar status quo; thus begins a permanent peace along the US-Canada border, marred only by occasional small, unauthorised raids
- 1815: Napoleon returns and for 100 days is again a threat; he is defeated at the Battle of Waterloo and permanently exiled to the British fortress on the remote island of Saint Helena.
- 1815: Victory over Napoleon marks the start of the Britain's Imperial Century, 1815–1914.
- 1815: Second Kandyan War (1815) – in Ceylon (now Sri Lanka)

== 1814–1914: Pax Britannica ==
The main issues in UK foreign policy from 1815 to 1900 were:

1. Maintaining Britain's global trade and naval supremacy. Britain sought to protect its extensive trade networks and commercial interests around the world, which required a strong navy to secure sea lanes and project power globally. There was no need for a large army.
2. Intervening as needed to uphold peace and the balance of power in Europe, or "Pax Britannica." This meant containing the expansionism of France and Russia before 1900. Britain formed numerous international coalitions to counter their influence and ambitions, as well as the Crimean War against Russia. After 1900 they became allies.
3. Managing Britain's colonial and imperial interests, especially in India. India was a critical strategic asset for Britain, providing resources, trade opportunities, and geographic positioning to support the British global empire. Protection of Canada required good relations with the United States.
4. Protecting British interests and trade in regions outside of Europe, including China, the Middle East, and Latin America. This involved military interventions, diplomatic pressure, and efforts to maintain open markets.
5. Before 1900, a "splendid isolation" with no permanent alliances. After 1900, informal alliance with France in defence of France against German threats.

=== Defence policy ===
The main function of the British defence system, and especially of the Royal Navy, was defence of its overseas empire, in addition to defence of the homeland. The army, usually in cooperation with local forces, suppressed internal revolts, losing only the American War of Independence (1775–83). David Armitage says it became an element of the British creed that:

Protestantism, oceanic commerce and mastery of the seas provided bastions to protect the freedom of inhabitants of the British Empire. That freedom found its institutional expression in Parliament, the law, property, and rights, all of which were exported throughout the British Atlantic world. Such freedom also allowed the British, uniquely, to combine the classically incompatible ideals of liberty and empire.

Away from the high seas, Britain's commitment in India, and exaggerated fears of Russian intentions, led to involvement in Great-Game rivalry with the Russian Empire.

Britain, with its global empire, powerful Navy, leading industrial base, and unmatched financial and trade networks, dominated diplomacy in Europe and the world in the largely peaceful century from 1814 to 1914.

=== British leadership ===
British military interventions in 1815–50 included opening up markets in Latin America (as in Argentina), opening the China market, responding to humanitarians by sending the Royal Navy to shut down the Atlantic slave-trade, and building a balance of power in Europe, as in Spain and Belgium.

Robert Banks Jenkinson, 2nd Earl of Liverpool was prime minister 1812 to 1827. He worked with other victorious nations to make sure that France was under conservative control. Advisors on foreign policy included Viscount Castlereagh, George Canning, and the Duke of Wellington. Key issues included the European balance of power, and unrest in Spain. The ministry restored good terms with the United States in the Rush–Bagot Treaty of 1819. and cooperated with Washington in protecting Latin America through the Monroe Doctrine. The Eastern question involving the Ottoman Empire and Greek and Balkan independence emerged as a perennial problem for the next century.

==== Palmerston ====
Lord Palmerston, as a Whig and then as a Liberal, became the dominant leader in British foreign policy for most of the period from 1830 until his death in 1865. As Foreign Secretary (1830-1834, 1835–1841 and 1846–1851) and subsequently as prime minister, Palmerston sought to maintain the balance of power in Europe, sometimes opposing France and at other times aligning with France to do so. Thus he aligned Britain with France in the Crimean War against Russia, which the allies fought and won with the limited goal of protecting the Ottoman Empire. Some of his aggressive actions became highly controversial at the time, and remain so today. For example, he used military force to achieve his main goal of opening China to trade, although his critics focused on his support for the opium trade. He was an innovative administrator who devised ways to enhance his control of his department and to build up his reputation. He controlled all communication within the Foreign Office and to other officials. He leaked secrets to the press, published selected documents, and released letters to give himself more control.

To summarize his impact on British foreign policy:

1. He promoted Britain's role as the countervailing force to maintain the peaceful balance of power.
2. He promoted liberalism in Europe in the face of strong conservative trends.
3. He identified Russia as the main adversary Asia and supported the Crimean War and efforts to block Russian threats to India.
4. He tried to maintain good terms with France and Napoleon III, while pushing back against aggrandizement of power.
5. He strongly supported Greek independence from Ottoman control.
6. His main goal during the upheavals of 1848 was to prevent a major war between France and Russia. He personally approved of the liberal revolutions but did not intervene in any of them.
7. He supported the unification of Italy.
8. He used force to maintain Britain's role in China.
9. Although sympathetic to the more aristocratic Confederacy, he helped keep Britain neutral in the American Civil War.

==== Peel ====
Robert Peel Was the Whig prime minister 1841-1846. His policy in Europe was marked by a strong commitment to maintaining peace and stability. Peel, along with his Foreign Secretary, Lord Aberdeen, pursued a cautious and pragmatic approach aimed at balancing power within Europe and preventing conflicts that could disrupt British interests.

Peel fostered good relations with France. He and Aberdeen worked closely with French Foreign Minister François Guizot. They amicably resolved the Tahiti affair in 1844, where French control of Tahiti led to tensions with Britain.

Peel's foreign policy towards Russia was characterised by a mix of cautious engagement and strategic competition, particularly in the context of the Great Game in Central Asia. The rivalry between Britain and Russia for influence over Central Asia and the approach to the Indian frontier was a major concern for Peel's administration. While seeking to avoid direct confrontation, Peel supported efforts to counter Russian advances through diplomatic and military means.

Peel resolved tensions with the United States regarding boundary lines. The most notable achievement was the Webster-Ashburton Treaty of 1842, which successfully settled the boundary dispute between the U.S. and British-ruled Canada in the region of Maine and New Brunswick. Peel also successfully compromised the Oregon boundary dispute. The result was good relations down to the American Civil War of 1861-1865.

==== Aberdeen ====
Lord Aberdeen was a highly successful diplomat in many controversies from 1812 to 1856, but failed badly in handling the Crimean War, and retired in 1856. In 1813-1814 as ambassador to the Austrian Empire he negotiated the alliances and financing that led to the defeat of Napoleon. In Paris he normalized relations with the newly-restored Bourbon government and convinced London that the Bourbons could be trusted. He worked well with top European diplomats such as his friends Klemens von Metternich in Vienna and François Guizot in Paris. He brought Britain into the center of Continental diplomacy on critical issues, such as the local wars in Greece, Portugal and Belgium. Simmering troubles with the United States were ended by compromising the border dispute in Maine that gave most of the land to the Americans but gave Canada critically important links to a warm-water port. He played a central role in winning the First Opium War against China, gaining control of Hong Kong in the process.

==== Disraeli ====
Benjamin Disraeli, the Conservative leader for much of the mid-19th century, built up the British Empire and played a major role in European diplomacy. Disraeli's second term as prime minister (1874–1880) was dominated by the Eastern Question—the slow decay of the Ottoman Empire and the desire of other European powers, such as Russia, to gain at Ottoman expense. Disraeli arranged for the British to purchase (1875) a major interest in the Suez Canal Company (in Ottoman-controlled Egypt). In 1878, faced with Russian victories against the Ottomans, he worked at the Congress of Berlin to obtain peace in the Balkans on terms favourable to Britain and unfavourable to Russia, its longstanding enemy. This diplomatic victory over Russia established Disraeli as one of Europe's leading statesmen. World events thereafter moved against the Conservative Party. Controversial wars in Afghanistan (1878-1880) and in South Africa (1879) undermined Disraeli's public support.

==== Gladstone ====
William Ewart Gladstone (Prime Minister 1868–1874, 1880–1885, 1886, 1892–1894), the Liberal Party leader, was much less inclined to imperialism than Disraeli, and sought peace as the highest foreign-policy goal. However, historians have been sharply critical of Gladstone's foreign policy during his second ministry. Paul Hayes says it "provides one of the most intriguing and perplexing tales of muddle and incompetence in foreign affairs, unsurpassed in modern political history until the days of Grey and, later, Neville Chamberlain." Gladstone opposed himself to the "colonial lobby" which pushed the scramble for Africa. His term saw the end of the Second Anglo-Afghan War in 1880, the First Boer War of 1880-1881 and outbreak of the war (1881-1899) against the Mahdi in Sudan.

==== Salisbury ====
Historians largely view Lord Salisbury (Foreign Minister 1878–1880, 1885–86, 1887–1892, and 1895–1900 and Prime Minister 1885-86, 1886–1892, 1895–1902) as a strong and effective leader in foreign affairs. Historians in the late-20th century rejected the older view that Salisbury pursued a policy of "splendid isolation". He had a superb grasp of the issues, and proved:

a patient, pragmatic practitioner, with a keen understanding of Britain's historic interests....He oversaw the partition of Africa, the emergence of Germany and the United States as imperial powers, and the transfer of British attention from the Dardanelles to Suez without provoking a serious confrontation of the great powers.

=== Free-trade imperialism ===
The Great Exhibition of 1851 clearly demonstrated Britain's dominance in engineering and industry, which would last until the rise of Germany and the United States in the 1890s. Using free trade and financial investment as imperial tools, Britain exerted major influence on many economies, especially in Latin America and in Asia. Thus Britain had both a formal British Empire, and an informal one of British importers and exporters, shippers, investors and financiers based in most major ports around the world.

=== Relations in Europe ===
==== Relations with France ====
In the 1875–1898 era, there was peace—but it was "an armed peace, characterized by alarms, distrust, rancour and irritation." During the Scramble for Africa in the 1880s, the British and French generally recognised each other's spheres of influence. In an agreement in 1890 Great Britain was recognised in Bahr-el-Ghazal and Darfur, while Wadai, Bagirmi, Kanem, and the territory to the north and east of Lake Chad were assigned to France.

The Suez Canal, initially built by the French, became a joint British-French project in 1875, as both saw it as vital to maintaining their influence and empires in Asia. In 1882, ongoing civil disturbances in Egypt (see Urabi Revolt) prompted Britain to intervene, inviting France to join. France's expansionist Prime Minister Jules Ferry was out of office, and the government was unwilling to send more than an intimidating fleet to the region. Britain established a protectorate, and popular opinion in France later put this action down to duplicity. It was about this time that the two nations established co-ownership of Vanuatu, a small island in the Pacific. The Anglo-French Convention of 1882 was also signed to resolve boundary disagreements in western Africa.

One brief but dangerous dispute occurred during the Fashoda Incident in 1898 when French troops tried to claim an area in the Southern Sudan, and a stronger British force arrived from Egypt to force it away. Under heavy pressure the French withdrew and Britain took control over the area, as France recognised British control of the Sudan. France received control of the small kingdom of Wadai, which consolidated its holdings in northwest Africa. France had failed in its main goals. P.M.H. Bell says:

Between the two governments there was a brief battle of wills, with the British insisting on immediate and unconditional French withdrawal from Fashoda. The French had to accept these terms, amounting to a public humiliation....Fashoda was long remembered in France as an example of British brutality and injustice."

Fashoda was a diplomatic victory for the British because the French realised that in the long run they needed friendship with Britain in case of a war between France and Germany.

==== Relations with German states ====
Before the Unification of Germany in 1871, Britain was often allied in wartime with German nations, including Prussia. The royal families often intermarried. The House of Hanover (1714–1837) ruled the small Electorate of Hanover, later the Kingdom of Hanover, as well as Britain. Queen Victoria, known as the grandmother of Europe, married Prince Albert of Saxe-Coburg and Gotha, and further diplomatic marriages would result in their grandchildren occupying both the British and German thrones.

Otto von Bismarck dominated Prussian and German foreign policy from the 1860s to 1890. After the defeat of France in 1871 he engaged in a policy of diplomatically isolating France while maintaining cordial relations with Britain and other nations in Europe. He had little interest in naval or colonial entanglements and thus avoided discord with Britain. Historians emphasize that he wanted no more territorial gains after 1871, and vigorously worked to form cross-linking alliances that prevented any war in Europe from starting. By 1878 both the Liberal and Conservative spokesmen in Britain hailed him as the champion of peace in Europe. A. J. P. Taylor concludes that, "Bismarck was an honest broker of peace; and his system of alliances compelled every Power, whatever its will, to follow a peaceful course".

The only wars between the two powers were World War I and World War II. Each was a major world event, and each was a decisive defeat for Germany. Historians have long focused on the diplomatic and naval rivalries between Germany and Britain after 1871 to search for the root causes of the growing antagonism that led to World War I. In recent years, historians have paid greater attention to the mutual cultural, ideological and technological influences.

=== Relations outside Western Europe ===
==== Slave trade ====
The Atlantic slave trade was a target of British reformers. Britain made the international trade illegal in 1807. It purchased from the owners the freedom of the slaves in its colonies in the 1830s. It used the Royal Navy to aggressively intercept slave transportation, releasing the freed captives to its colony in Sierra Leone.

==== United States ====
British relations with the United States often became strained, and even verged on armed conflict when Britain almost supported the Confederacy in the early part of the American Civil War of 1861-1865. British leaders were constantly annoyed from the 1840s to the 1860s by what they saw as Washington's pandering to the democratic mob, as in the Oregon boundary dispute in 1844–46. However British middle-class public-opinion sensed a common "Special Relationship" between the two peoples based on language, migration, evangelical Protestantism, liberal traditions, and extensive trade. This constituency prevailed, forcing London to appease the Union. During the Trent affair of late 1861 London drew the line and Washington retreated.

British public opinion was divided. The Confederacy tended to have support from the elites—from the aristocracy and gentry, which identified with the landed plantation owners, and from Anglican clergy and those who admired tradition, hierarchy and paternalism. The Union was favored by the middle classes, the Nonconformists in religion, intellectuals, reformers and most factory workers, who saw slavery and forced labor as a threat to the status of the workingman. The cabinet made the decisions. Chancellor of the Exchequer William E Gladstone, whose family fortune was based on slave plantations in the West Indies, supported the Confederacy. Foreign Minister Lord Russell wanted neutrality. Prime Minister Lord Palmerston wavered between support for Confederate independence, his opposition to slavery, and the economic advantages of remaining neutral.

Britain remained neutral while helping both sides. It built Confederate warships and operated its own blockade runners. More profitable was the large scale trade with the United States. Furthermore many Britons volunteered to fight for the Northern Union Army. Northern food was much more essential to Britain than Southern cotton. After the war, the US demanded reparations (called the Alabama Claims) for the damages caused by the warships. After arbitration the British government paid the U.S. Treasury $15.5 million in 1872 and peaceful relations resumed.

==== Latin America ====
The independence of Latin American countries, especially after 1826, opened lucrative prospects for London financiers. The region was gravely devastated by the wars of independence, and featured weak financial systems, weak governments and repeated coups and internal rebellions. However, the region had a well-developed export sector focused on foods that were in demand in Europe, especially sugar, coffee, wheat and (after the arrival of refrigeration from the 1860s), beef. There also was a well-developed mining sector. With the Spanish out of the picture, ex-Spanish America in the early 1820s was a devastated region suffering in a deep depression. British entrepreneurs rushed in to fill the void by the middle 1820s, as the London government use its diplomatic power to encourage large-scale investment. The Royal Navy provided protection against piracy. The British established communities of merchants in major cities—including 3000 Britons in Buenos Aires. London financiers purchased £17 million in Latin American government bonds, especially those of Argentina, Chile, Peru and Mexico. They invested another £35 million in 46 stock companies set up to operate primarily in Latin America. The bubble soon burst, but the survivors operated quietly and profitably for many decades. From the 1820s to the 1850s, over 260 British merchant houses operated in the River Plate or Chile, and hundreds more in the rest of Latin America. The Latin American market was important for the cotton manufacturers of Lancashire. They supported the independence movement, and persuaded the British government to station commercial consuls in all the major trading centers in Latin America. The British were permanently committed, and it took decades – until the 1860s – before the commercial and involvement paid serious dividends. By 1875 Latin America was firmly integrated into a transatlantic economy under British leadership. After 1898 the British had to compete commercially with the United States.

In long-term perspective, Britain's influence in Latin America was enormous after independence became established in the 1820s. Britain deliberately sought to replace the Spanish in economic and cultural affairs. Military issues and colonization were minor factors. British influence operated through diplomacy, trade, banking, and investment in railways and mines. The English language and British cultural norms were transmitted by energetic young British business agents on temporary assignment in the major commercial centers, where they invited locals into British leisure activities, such as organized sports, and into their transplanted cultural institutions such as clubs and schools. The impact on sports proved overwhelming as Latin America enthusiastically took up football (soccer). In Argentina, rugby, polo, tennis and golf became important in middle-class leisure. Cricket was ignored. The British role never disappeared, but it faded rapidly after 1914 as the British cashed in their investments to pay for their Great War of 1914-1918, and the United States moved into the region with overwhelming force and similar cultural norms.

No actual wars in 19th-century Latin America directly involved Britain, however several confrontations took place. The most serious came in 1845–1850 when British and French navies blockaded Buenos Aires in order to protect the independence of Uruguay from Juan Manuel de Rosas, the dictator of Argentina. Other lesser controversies with Argentina broke out in 1833, with Guatemala in 1859, Mexico in 1861, Nicaragua in 1894, and Venezuela in 1895 and 1902. There also was tension along the Mosquito Coast in Central America in the 1830s and 1840s.

==== The Ottoman Empire ====
As the 19th century progressed the Ottoman Empire grew weaker and Britain increasingly became its protector, even fighting the Crimean War in the 1850s to help it out against Russia. Three British leaders played major roles. Lord Palmerston in the 1830–65 era considered the Ottoman Empire an essential component in the balance of power, was the most favourable toward Constantinople. William Gladstone in the 1870s sought to build a Concert of Europe that would support the survival of the empire. In the 1880s and 1890s Lord Salisbury contemplated an orderly dismemberment of it, in such a way as to reduce rivalry between the greater powers.

==== Crimean War against Russia 1854–1856 ====
The Crimean War (1854–56) was fought between Russia on the one hand and an alliance of Britain, France, Sardinia, and the Ottoman Empire on the other. Russia was defeated but the casualties were very heavy on all sides, and historians look at the entire episode as a series of blunders.

The war began with Russian demands to protect Christian sites in the Holy Land. The churches quickly settled that problem, but it escalated out of hand as Russia put continuous pressure on the Ottomans. Diplomatic efforts failed. The Sultan declared war against Russia in October 1851. Following an Ottoman naval disaster in November, Britain and France declared war against Russia. It proved quite difficult to reach Russian territory, and the Royal Navy could not defeat the Russian defences in the Baltic. Most of the battles took place in the Crimean peninsula, which the Allies finally seized. London, shocked to discover that France was secretly negotiating with Russia to form a postwar alliance to dominate Europe, dropped its plans to attack St. Petersburg and instead signed a one-sided armistice with Russia that achieved almost none of its war aims.

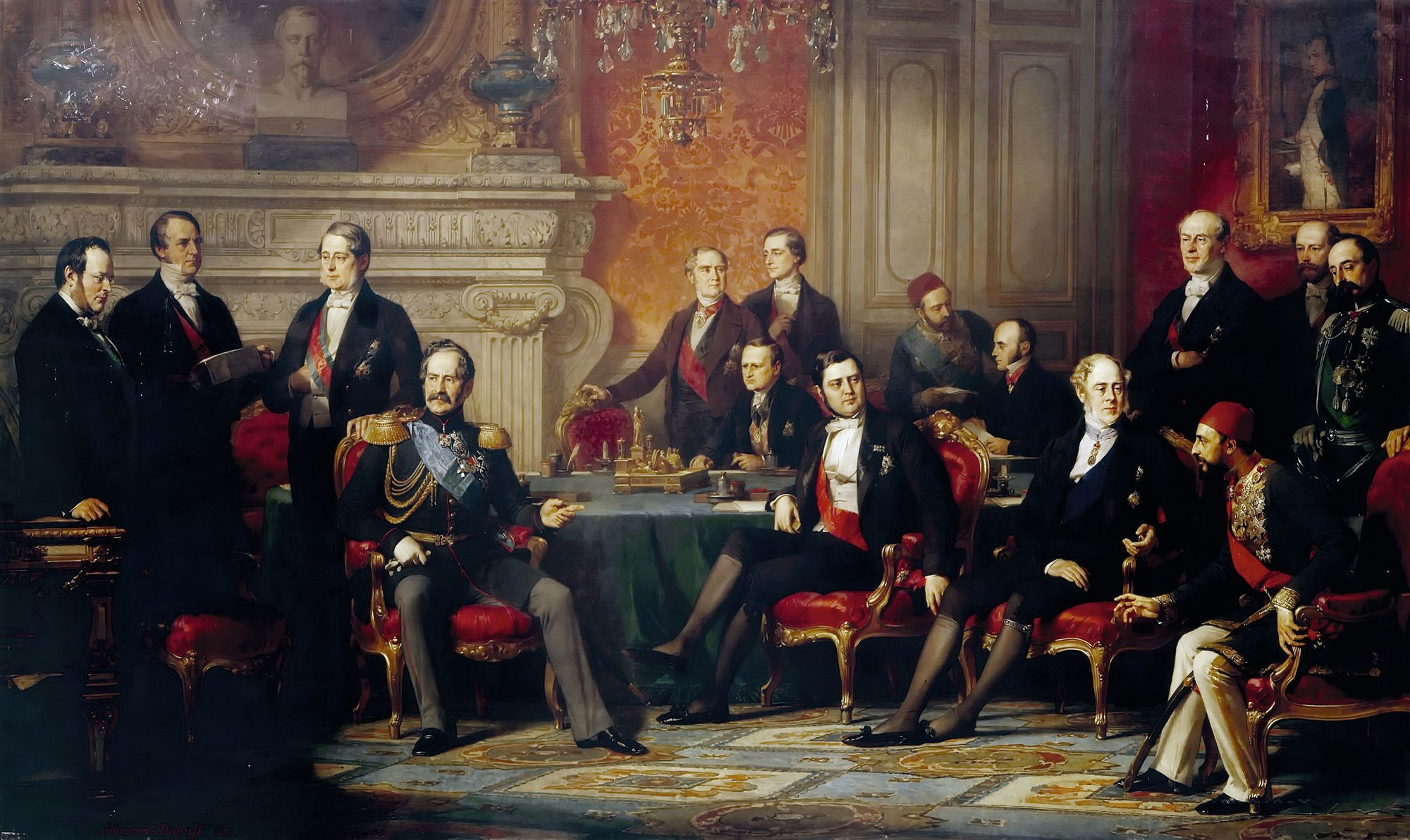
Diplomats at the Congress of Paris, 1856, settled the Crimean War; The Congress of Paris by Edouard Louis Dubufe.

The Treaty of Paris signed March 30, 1856, ended the war. Russia gave up a little land and relinquished its claim to a protectorate over the Christians in the Ottoman domains. However, by 1870, the Russians had regained most of their concessions.

The war helped modernize warfare by introducing major new technologies such as railways, the telegraph, and modern nursing methods. The war exposed serious weaknesses in the British military and medical services, which led to major reforms. Poor decision by Lord Aberdeen hurt his reputation and he was forced to resign. Of the 91,000 British soldiers and sailors sent to Crimea, 21,000 died, 80 percent of them from disease. The losses were reported in detail in the media and caused revulsion against warfare in Britain, combined with a celebration of the heroic common soldier who demonstrated Christian virtue. The great heroine was Florence Nightingale, who was hailed for her devotion to caring for the wounded and her emphasis on middle-class efficiency. She typified a moral status as a nurse that was superior to aristocratic militarism in terms of both morality and efficiency.

Historian R. B. McCallum points out the war was enthusiastically supported by the British populace as it was happening, but the mood changed very dramatically afterwards. Pacifists and critics were unpopular but:

in the end they won. Cobden and Bright were true to their principles of foreign policy, which laid down the absolute minimum of intervention in European affairs and a deep moral reprobation of war....When the first enthusiasm was passed, when the dead were mourned, the sufferings revealed, and the cost counted, when in 1870 Russia was able calmly to secure the revocation of the Treaty, which disarmed her in the Black Sea, the view became general of the war was stupid and unnecessary, and effected nothing....The Crimean war remained as a classic example...of how governments may plunge into war, how strong ambassadors may mislead weak prime ministers, how the public may be worked up into a facile fury, and how the achievements of the war may crumble to nothing. The Bright-Cobden criticism of the war was remembered and to a large extent accepted [especially by the Liberal Party]. Isolation from European entanglements seemed more than ever desirable.

==== Takeover of Egypt, 1882–1914 ====
The most decisive event emerged from the Anglo-Egyptian War, which resulted in the occupation of the Khedivate of Egypt. Although the Ottoman Empire was the nominal owner, in practice Britain made all the decisions. In 1914, Britain went to war with the Ottomans and ended their nominal role. Historian A. J. P. Taylor says that the seizure, which lasted seven decades, "was a great event; indeed, the only real event in international relations between the Battle of Sedan and the defeat of Russia and the Russo-Japanese war." Taylor emphasizes long-term impact:

The British occupation of Egypt altered the balance of power. It not only gave the British security for their route to India; it made them masters of the Eastern Mediterranean and the Middle East; it made it unnecessary for them to stand in the front line against Russia at the Straits....And thus prepared the way for the Franco-Russian Alliance ten years later.

==== Relations with China ====
Britain looked to China as a vast potential market, and had extensive trade in the 19th century. It sold opium and purchased tea and silk. At a time when Russia, Japan and France were taking control of Chinese territories, Britain avoided that move except in the case of taking Hong Kong. Along with the United States it wanted an "Open Door Policy" so that all nations could trade with China and invest there on equal terms.

Britain and other countries traded with China through the port of Canton. The rest of China was closed. By 1900 Britain had a large trade deficit due to Chinese exports of tea and silk, but minimal Chinese demand for British goods like machinery and woolens. After 1900 the Chinese demand for opium from British India exploded. In 1839, the Chinese government confiscated and destroyed large quantities of opium, leading Britain to declare war in the First Opium War (1839-1842). British victory produced the Treaty of Nanking in 1842. It ceded the lightly inhabited island of Hong Kong to Britain and opened up Shanghai and a few other treaty ports for foreign trade. Tensions soon flared up again in the Second Opium War (1856-1860). British victory produced the Convention of Peking in 1860, further expanding foreign concessions and privileges. After 1860, Britain, France, Russia and Japan systematically seized more commercial, legal, and territorial rights in China through a series of unequal treaties. The treaty port system allowed Britain and other foreign powers to establish a significant commercial and diplomatic presence in China. They were largely based in Shanghai, Canton and Hong Kong. Britain's trade and investment in China grew substantially during this period, making it China's leading trading partners by 1914, slightly ahead of Japan.

Missionary activity in China was undertaken by the Protestant churches. According to John K. Fairbank:

The opening of the country in the 1860s facilitated the great effort to Christianize China. Building on old [French] foundations, the Roman Catholic establishment totaled by 1894 some 750 European missionaries, 400 native priests, and over half a million communicants. By 1894 the newer Protestant mission effort supported over 1300 missionaries, mainly British and American, and maintained some 500 stations-each with a church, residences, street chapels, and usually a small school and possibly a hospital or dispensary-in about 350 different cities and towns. Yet they had made fewer than 60,000 Chinese Christian converts.

There was limited success in terms of converts and establishing schools, but growing anger at the threat of cultural imperialism. One result was the Boxer Rebellion (1899-1901), in which missions were attacked and thousands of Chinese Christians were massacred in order to destroy Western influences. Some Europeans were killed and many others threatened, Britain joined the other powers in a military invasion that suppressed the Boxers. One result back in Britain was a heightened fear of the "Yellow Peril" to the Western world order.

== 1900–1914 ==
After 1900 Britain ended its policy of "splendid isolation" by developing friendly relations with the United States and European powers – most notably France and Russia, in an alliance which fought the First World War. The "Special Relationship" with the United States starting about 1898 allowed Britain to largely relocate its naval forces out of the Western Hemisphere.

According to G. W. Monger's analysis of the Cabinet debates in 1900 to 1902, the colonial secretary Joseph Chamberlain:

advocated ending Britain's isolation by concluding an alliance with Germany; Salisbury resisted change. With the new crisis in China caused by the Boxer rising and Landsdowne's appointment to the Foreign Office in 1900, those who advocated a change won the upper hand. Landsdowne in turn attempted to reach an agreement with Germany and a settlement with Russia but failed. In the end Britain concluded an alliance with Japan. The decision of 1901 was momentous; British policy had been guided by events, but Lansdowne had no real understanding of these events. The change of policy had been forced on him and was a confession of Britain's weakness.

=== Germany and France ===
Germany's Chancellor Otto von Bismarck had dominated European diplomacy 1872–1890, with the determination to use the balance of power to keep the peace. There were no wars. However he was removed by an aggressive young Kaiser Wilhelm II in 1890, allowing French efforts to isolate Germany to become successful. Joseph Chamberlain, who played a major role in foreign policy in the late 1890s under the Salisbury government, repeatedly tried to open talks with Germany about some sort of an alliance. Germany was not interested. Instead, Berlin felt itself increasingly surrounded by France and Russia. Meanwhile, Paris went to great pains to woo Russia and Great Britain. Key markers were the Franco-Russian Alliance of 1894, the 1904 Entente Cordiale linking France and Great Britain, and finally the Anglo-Russian Entente in 1907 which became the Triple Entente. France thus had a formal alliance with Russia, and an informal alignment with Britain, against Germany. By 1903 Britain had established good relations with the United States and Japan.

=== End of Splendid Isolation ===
Britain abandoned the policy of holding aloof from the continental powers ("Splendid Isolation") in the 1900s after standing without friends during the Second Boer War (1899–1903). Britain concluded agreements, limited to colonial affairs, with her two major colonial rivals: the Entente Cordiale with France in 1904 and the Anglo-Russian Entente of 1907. Britain's alignment was a reaction to an assertive German foreign policy and the buildup of its navy from 1898, which led to the Anglo-German naval arms race. British diplomat Arthur Nicolson argued it was "far more disadvantageous to us to have an unfriendly France and Russia than an unfriendly Germany". The impact of the Triple Entente was to improve British relations with France and its ally Russia and to demote the importance to Britain of good relations with Germany. After 1905, foreign policy was tightly controlled by the Liberal foreign minister Edward Grey (1862–1933), who seldom consulted the Cabinet. Grey shared the strong Liberal policy against all wars and against military alliances that would force Britain to take a side in war. However, in the case of the Boer War, Grey held that the Boers had committed an aggression that it was necessary to repulse. The Liberal party split on the issue, with a large faction strongly opposed to the war in Africa

=== Triple Entente with France and Russia ===
The Triple Entente between Britain, France and Russia, in contrast to the Triple Alliance or the Franco-Russian Alliance, was not an alliance of mutual defence and Britain therefore felt free to make her own foreign policy decisions in 1914. The Liberal party members were highly pacifistic and moralistic, and by 1914 they have been increasingly convinced that German aggression violated international norms, and specifically that a German invasion of neutral Belgium was completely immoral. However the all-Liberal British cabinet decided on July 29, 1914, that being a signatory to the 1839 treaty about Belgium did not obligate it to oppose a German invasion of Belgium with military force. According to Isabel V. Hull :

Annika Mombauer correctly sums up the current historiography: "Few historians would still maintain that the 'rape of Belgium' was the real motive for Britain's declaration of war on Germany." Instead, the role of Belgian neutrality is variously interpreted as an excuse to mobilize the public, to provide embarrassed radicals in the cabinet with the justification for abandoning the principal pacifism and thus were staying in office, or in the more conspiratorial versions to cover for naked imperial interests.

As war neared the cabinet agreed that German defeat of France and control and the continent of Europe was intolerable and would be a cause for war.

=== Naval race with Germany ===
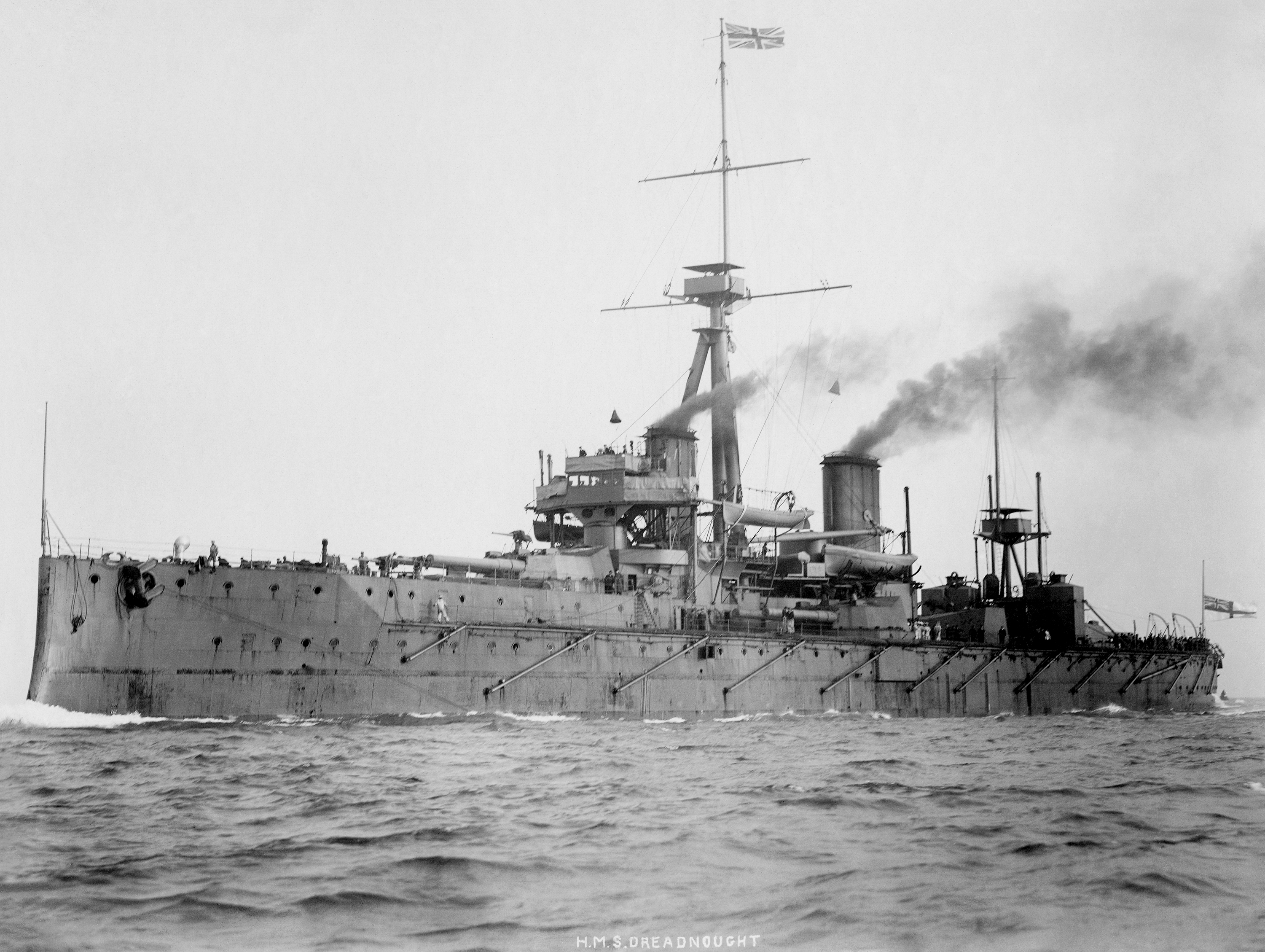
The British Dreadnought (1906) made all battleships obsolete because it had ten long-range 12-inch big guns, mechanical computer-like range finders, high speed turbine engines that could make 21 knots, and armour plates 11 inches thick.

After 1805 the dominance of Britain's Royal Navy was unchallenged; in the 1890s Germany decided to match it. Grand Admiral Alfred von Tirpitz (1849–1930) dominated German naval policy from 1897 until 1916. Tirpitz turned the modest little fleet into a world-class force that could threaten the British Royal Navy. The British responded with new technology typified by the Dreadnought revolution. It made every battleship obsolete and, supplemented by the global network of coaling stations and telegraph cables, enabled Britain to stay well in the lead in naval affairs.

At about the same time Britain developed the use of fuel oil in warships instead of coal. The naval benefits of oil were significant, making ships cheaper to build and run, giving them greater range, and removing strategic limitations imposed by the need for frequent stops at coaling stations. Britain had plenty of coal but no oil, and it had relied on American and Dutch oil suppliers, so its foreign policy made it a high priority. At the prompting of Admiral John Fisher, this was addressed by Winston Churchill, beginning with the Royal Commission on Fuel and Engines of 1912. Urgency was applied when it was learned that Germany was organising a supply of oil in the Middle East. Britain secured its own supplies through foreign policy and its 1914 purchase of a controlling, 51% stake in the Anglo-Persian Oil Company, of which BP is successor.

== First World War ==
Besides providing soldiers, munitions and fleets, one of Britain's most important roles was financing the war, with large-scale loans and grants to France, Russia, Italy and others. It tried to stay on friendly relations with the United States, which sold large quantities of raw materials and food, and provided large-scale loans. Germany was so convinced that the United States as a neutral was playing a decisive role, that it began unrestricted submarine warfare against the United States, which it knew it would lead to American entry into the war in April 1917. The United States then took over Britain's financial role, loaning large sums to Britain, France, Russia, Italy and the others. The US demanded repayment after the war, but did negotiate better terms for Britain. Finally in 1931, all debt payments were suspended.

== Interwar years 1919–1939 ==
Britain had suffered little devastation during the war and Prime Minister David Lloyd George supported reparations to a lesser extent than the French did at the 1919 Paris Peace Conference. Britain reluctantly supported the hard Treaty of Versailles, while the U.S. rejected it. France was the main sponsor in its quest for revenge.

Vivid memories of the horrors and deaths of the World War made Britain and its leaders strongly inclined to pacifism in the interwar era.

Britain was a "troubled giant" wielding much less influence than before. It often had to give way to the United States, which frequently exercised its financial superiority. The main themes of British foreign policy include a conciliatory role at the Paris Peace Conference of 1919, where Lloyd George worked hard to moderate French demands for revenge. He was partly successful, but Britain soon had to moderate French policy toward Germany, as in the Locarno Treaties. Britain was an active member of the new League of Nations, but the League had few major achievements, none of which greatly affected Britain or its Empire.

=== Breakup of Ottoman Empire ===
The Sykes–Picot Agreement was a secret 1916 agreement between Great Britain and France, deciding how the possessions of the Ottoman Empire would be split up after its defeat. The agreement defined their mutually agreed spheres of influence and control in the Middle East. The agreement allocated to Britain control of areas roughly comprising the coastal strip between the Mediterranean Sea and the River Jordan, Jordan, southern Iraq, and an additional small area that included the ports of Haifa and Acre, to allow access to the Mediterranean.

After the Ottoman defeat in 1918 the subsequent partitioning of the Ottoman Empire divided the Arab provinces outside the Arabian Peninsula into areas of British and French control and influence. Britain ruled Mandatory Iraq from 1920 until 1932, while the French Mandate for Syria and the Lebanon lasted from 1923 to 1946.

The British took control of Palestine in 1920 and ruled it as Mandatory Palestine from 1923 until 1948. However, the British in the Balfour Declaration of 1917 promised a Jewish zone of ambiguous status, which was unacceptable to the Arab leadership.

=== Fall of Lloyd George ===
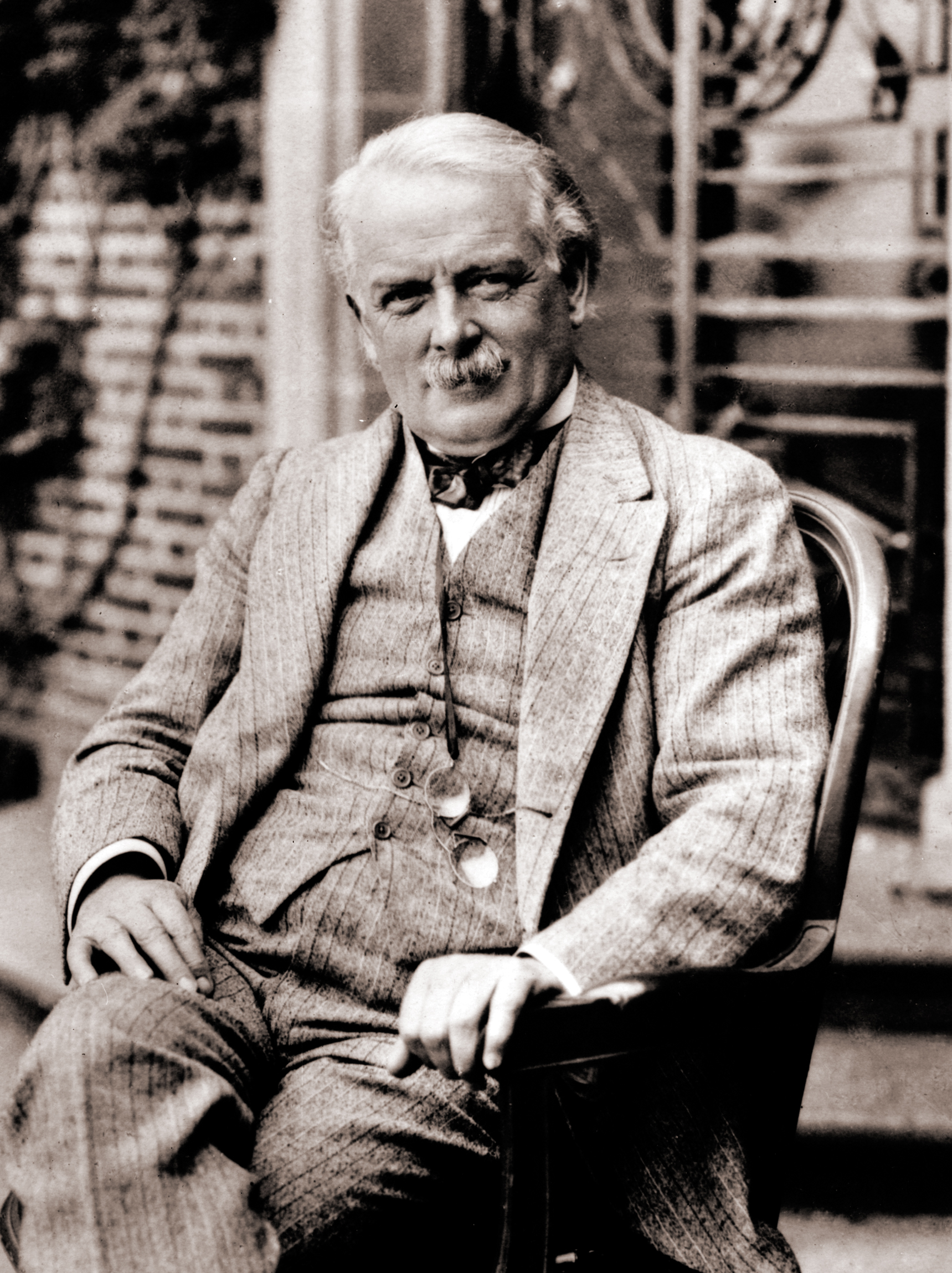
Lloyd George in 1922

The Treaty of Versailles had set up a series of temporary organizations, composed of delegations from key powers, to ensure the successful application of the Treaty. The system worked very poorly. The assembly of ambassadors was repeatedly overruled and became a nonentity. Most of the commissions were deeply divided and unable to either make decisions or convince the interested parties to carry them out. The most important commission was on Reparations, and France took full control of it. The new French prime minister Raymond Poincaré was intensely anti-German, was unrelenting in his demands for huge reparations, and was repeatedly challenged by Germany. France finally invaded parts of Germany, and Berlin responded by imposing a runaway inflation that seriously damage the German economy and also damaged the French economy. The United States, after refusing to ratify the League in 1920, almost completely disassociated itself from the League.

In 1921, the Anglo-Soviet Trade Agreement successfully opened trade relations with Communist Russia. Lloyd George was unable to negotiate full diplomatic relations, as the Russians rejected all repayment of Tsarist era debts, and conservatives in Britain grew exceedingly wary of the communist threat to European stability. Lloyd George in 1922 set about to make himself master of peace in the world, especially through a world conference in Genoa that he expected would rival Paris of 1919 in visibility, and restore his reputation. Everything went wrong. Poincaré and the French demanded a military alliance that was far beyond what the British would accept. Germany and Russia made their own sweeping agreement at Rapallo, which wrecked the Genoa conference. Finally, Lloyd George decided to support Greece in a war against Turkey in the Chanak Crisis. It was yet another fiasco as all but two of the Dominions refused support and the British military was hesitant. The Conservatives rejected a war, with Bonar Law telling the nation, "We cannot act alone as the policeman of the world." Greece lost its war and Lloyd George lost control of his coalition. He never again held major office. Internationally and especially at home, Lloyd George the hero of the world war had suddenly become a failed model.

=== Naval disarmament and debts ===
Disarmament was high on the popular agenda, and Britain supported the leadership of United States in the Washington Naval Conference of 1921 in working toward naval disarmament of the major powers. Britain played a leading role in the 1927 Geneva Naval Conference and the 1930 London Conference that led to the London Naval Treaty. However the refusal of Japan, Germany, Italy and Russia to go along led to the meaningless Second London Naval Treaty of 1936. Disarmament had collapsed and the issue became rearming for a war against Germany.

Britain was less successful in negotiating with United States regarding the large wartime loans. The U.S. insisted on repayment of the full £978 million. It was agreed to in 1923 at the interest rate of 3% to 3.5% over 62 years. Under Labour prime minister Ramsay MacDonald, Britain took the lead in getting France to accept a solution to the issue of reparations through the Dawes Plan and the Young Plan. The Dawes Plan (1924–1929) stabilised the German currency and lowered reparations payments, allowing Germany to access capital markets (mostly American) for the money it owed the Allies in reparations, although the payments came at the price of a high foreign debt. The Great Depression starting in 1929 put enormous pressure on the British economy. Britain move toward imperial preference, which meant low tariffs among the Commonwealth of Nations, and higher barriers toward trade with outside countries. The flow of money from New York dried up, and the system of reparations and payment of debt collapsed in 1931. The debts were renegotiated in the 1950s.

=== Seeking stability in Europe ===
Britain sought peace with Germany through the Locarno Treaties of 1925. A main goal was to restore Germany to a peaceful, prosperous state.

The success at Locarno in handling the German question impelled Foreign Secretary Austen Chamberlain, working with France and Italy, to find a master solution to the diplomatic problems of Eastern Europe and the Balkans. It proved impossible to overcome mutual antagonisms, because Chamberlain's programme was flawed by his misperceptions and fallacious judgments.

Britain thought disarmament was the key to peace. France, with its profound fear of German militarism, strenuously opposed the idea. In the early 1930s, most Britons saw France, not Germany, as the chief threat to peace and harmony in Europe. France did not suffer as severe an economic recession, and was the strongest military power, but still it refused British overtures for disarmament.

The Dominions (Canada, Australia, South Africa and New Zealand) achieved virtual independence in foreign policy in 1931, though each depended heavily upon British naval protection. After 1931 trade policy favoured the Commonwealth with tariffs against the U.S. and others.

=== Foreign policy in domestic politics ===
The Labour Party came to power in 1924 under Ramsay MacDonald, who served as party leader, prime minister and foreign secretary. The party had a distinctive and foreign policy based on pacifism and socialism. It held that peace was impossible because of capitalism, secret diplomacy, and the trade in armaments.

The Zinoviev letter appeared during the 1924 general election and purported to be a directive from the Communist International in Moscow to the Communist Party of Great Britain. It said the resumption of diplomatic relations (by a Labour government) would hasten the radicalisation of the British working class. It was a forgery but it helped defeat Labour as the Conservatives scored a landslide. A.J.P. Taylor argues that the most important impact was on the psychology of Labourites, who for years blamed their defeat on foul play, thereby misunderstanding the political forces at work and postponing needed reforms in the Labour Party. MacDonald returned to power in 1929. There was little pacifism left. He strongly supported the League of Nations but he also felt that cohesion within the British Empire and a strong, independent British defence programme would be the best policy.

=== 1930s ===
Britain and France led the policy of non-interference in the Spanish Civil War (1936–39). The League of Nations proved disappointing to its supporters; it was unable to resolve any of the threats posed by Benito Mussolini of Fascist Italy from 1923, then from 1933 Adolf Hitler of Nazi Germany. British policy was to "appease" them in the hopes they would be satiated. League-authorized sanctions against Italy for its invasion of Ethiopia had support in Britain but proved a failure and were dropped in 1936.

By 1930 British leaders and intellectuals largely agreed that all major powers shared the blame for war in 1914, and not Germany alone as the Treaty of Versailles specified. Therefore, they believed the punitive harshness of the Treaty of Versailles was unwarranted, and this view, adopted by politicians and the public, was largely responsible for supporting appeasement policies down to 1938. That is, German rejections of treaty provisions seemed justified.

=== Coming of Second World War ===
By late 1938 it was clear that war was looming, and that Germany had the world's most powerful military. The British military leaders warned that Germany would win a war, and Britain needed another year or two to catch up in terms of aviation and air defence. The final act of appeasement came when Britain and France sacrificed the Sudetenland border regions of Czechoslovakia to Hitler's demands at the Munich Agreement of 1938. Hitler was not satiated and, in March 1939, seized all of Czechoslovakia and menaced Poland. At last Prime Minister Neville Chamberlain dropped appeasement and stood firm in promising to defend Poland. Hitler however cut a deal with Joseph Stalin to divide Eastern Europe; when Germany did invade Poland in September 1939, Britain and France declared war; the British Commonwealth followed London's lead.

== Since 1945 ==
Despite the heavy American grants of Lend Lease food oil and munitions (which did not have to be repaid) plus American loans, and a grant of money and loans from Canada at the end of the war Britain was on the verge of bankruptcy. John Maynard Keynes argued the only solution was to drastically cut back the spending on the British Empire, which amounted to £2,000 million. The postwar overseas deficit was £1,400 million, warned Keynes, and, "it is this expenditure which is wholly responsible for either financial difficulties." Both Winston Churchill and Clement Attlee ignored his advice and kept spending heavily, in part by borrowing from India. The United States provided a £3,500 million 50-year loan in 1946 and sudden grant of independence to India and Pakistan in 1947 did solve much of the problem. Marshall Plan money began flowing in 1948, And by the time it ended in 1951 the financial crisis was over. The new Labour government knew the expenses of British involvement across the globe were financially crippling. The postwar military cost £200 million a year, To put 1.3 million men in uniform, combat fleets in the Atlantic, the Mediterranean, and the Indian Ocean as well as a Hong Kong station in China, bases Across the globe, as well as 120 full Royal Air Force squadrons. Britain now shed traditional overseas military roles as fast as possible. American financial aid was available on Washington's terms, as seen in the 1945 Anglo-American loan, the convertibility of sterling crisis of 1947, the devaluation of the pound sterling in 1949, and the rearmament programme in support of the U.S. in the Korean War, 1950–53. On the other hand, he had some success in convincing Washington to take over roles that were too expensive for Britain, including the rebuilding of the European economy, and supporting anti-communist governments in Greece and elsewhere. Bevin had the firm support of his party, especially Prime Minister Clement Attlee, despite a left-wing opposition. Top American diplomats such as Dean Acheson trusted Bevin and worked through him.

=== Cold War ===
With the election of a Labour government in the 1945 general election, union leader Ernest Bevin became foreign secretary. He is best known for taking a strong anti-Communist position regarding the emerging Cold War, and encouraging the U.S. to take a more active role as budgetary constraints forced Britain to reduce its role in Greece. However that was not his original plan. At first he envisioned a European "third force", led by Britain and France, to mediate between the two superpowers, the U.S. and the Soviet Union. In 1945–46 he hoped that European integration would also allow establish Britain to be free from US economic domination. In January 1946, however, Charles De Gaulle retired and Bevin expected some sort of "imminent Sovietization" would move France to the left. Furthermore, it became clear that American loans and grants were essential to British solvency. He now decided on a friendly collaboration with the U.S. hoping to guide its role in the Cold War. and strongly encouraged Washington to assume Britain's old role of helping the Greek government suppress a Communist rebellion through the Truman Doctrine.

==== Marshall Plan ====
The American Marshall Plan (officially the "European Recovery Program", ERP) gave $12 billion in financial grants to war-torn nations. ERP required the recipients to organize as the "Committee on European Economic Co-operation". Under Bevin the UK took the lead in coordinating support from the Western European nations that accepted the aid. (Eastern Bloc satellites turned the money down.) The British economy has started to recover by 1948—the main goal was not so much rescue or recovery as modernization of the economy. The Marshall Plan wanted to stimulate long-term economic growth. It required the removal all sorts of economic bottlenecks and restrictions, and called for free trade and low tariffs (a long-time American goal). Britain received $3.2 billion; separately Canada gave an unrestricted $1 billion grant. Repayment was not required. The grants were used to purchase oil, wheat, meat and other foods exported from the two donor nations. These products were in turn purchased by British consumers for pounds, and the revenue became matching funds used by UK government to modernize its economy. Britain also received large loans from the U.S. that were repaid over six decades at low interest, used to balance the budget.

=== NATO ===
British diplomacy under the leadership of foreign secretary Ernest Bevin set the stage for NATO. Britain and France in 1947 signed the Treaty of Dunkirk, a defensive pact. This expanded in 1948 with the Treaty of Brussels to add the three Benelux countries. It committed them to collective defence against any armed attack for fifty years. Bevin worked with Washington to expand the alliance into NATO in 1949, adding the U.S. and Canada as well as Italy, Portugal, Norway, Denmark and Iceland. West Germany and Spain joined later. Historians give credence to the old wisecrack that the organization's goal was "to keep the Russians out, the Americans in, and the Germans down".

The formation of NATO in 1949 solidified UK-US relations. Britain allowed—indeed encouraged—building American air bases in Britain to threaten the USSR with nuclear attack. Stationing American bombers in Britain gave London a voice in how they could be used and avoided American unilateralism. However the U.S. went its own way after 1945 in building nuclear weapons; Britain and later France developed their own.

=== Breakup of British Empire ===
The British built up a very large worldwide British Empire, which peaked in size in 1922. The cumulative costs of fighting two world wars, however, placed a heavy burden upon the UK economy, and after 1945 the British Empire gradually began to disintegrate, with many territories demanding independence. The India region split into India, Pakistan, Ceylon and Burma. By the late 1950s, almost all the colonies were independent. Most colonial territories joined the Commonwealth of Nations, an organisation of fully independent nations now with equal status to the UK.

Britain reduced its involvements in the Middle East, with the humiliating Suez Crisis of 1956 marking the end of its status as a superpower. However Britain did forge close military ties with the United States, France, and traditional foes such as Germany, in the NATO military alliance. After years of debate (and rebuffs), Britain joined the Common Market in 1973; it is now the European Union. However it did not merge financially, and kept the pound separate from the Euro, which kept it partly isolated from the EU Euro area crisis. After years of debate, Britain voted on 23 June 2016 for "Brexit", to leave the EU.

==== Palestine and Israel ====
The League of Nations assigned Palestine as a mandate to the UK in 1920. The British tried, but failed to stop large-scale Jewish immigration into the mandate. Britain returned it to UN control in 1947 and the UN divided Palestine into a Jewish state and an Arab state. Israel came into existence on May 14, 1948, fought off the Arab neighbors, and became a power in the region.

=== Prime Minister Thatcher, 1979–1990 ===
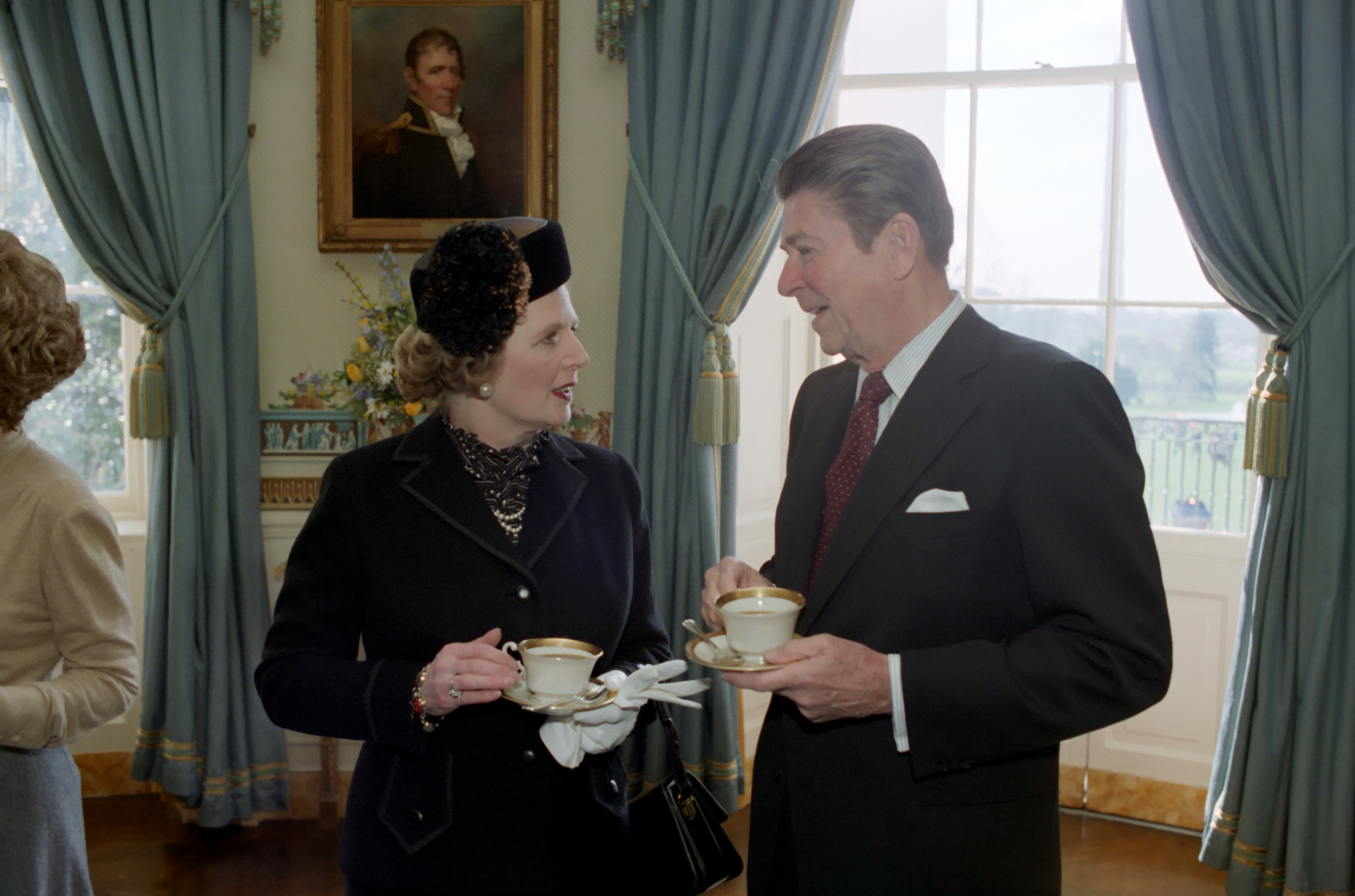
President Reagan and Prime Minister Thatcher at the White House, 26 February 1981

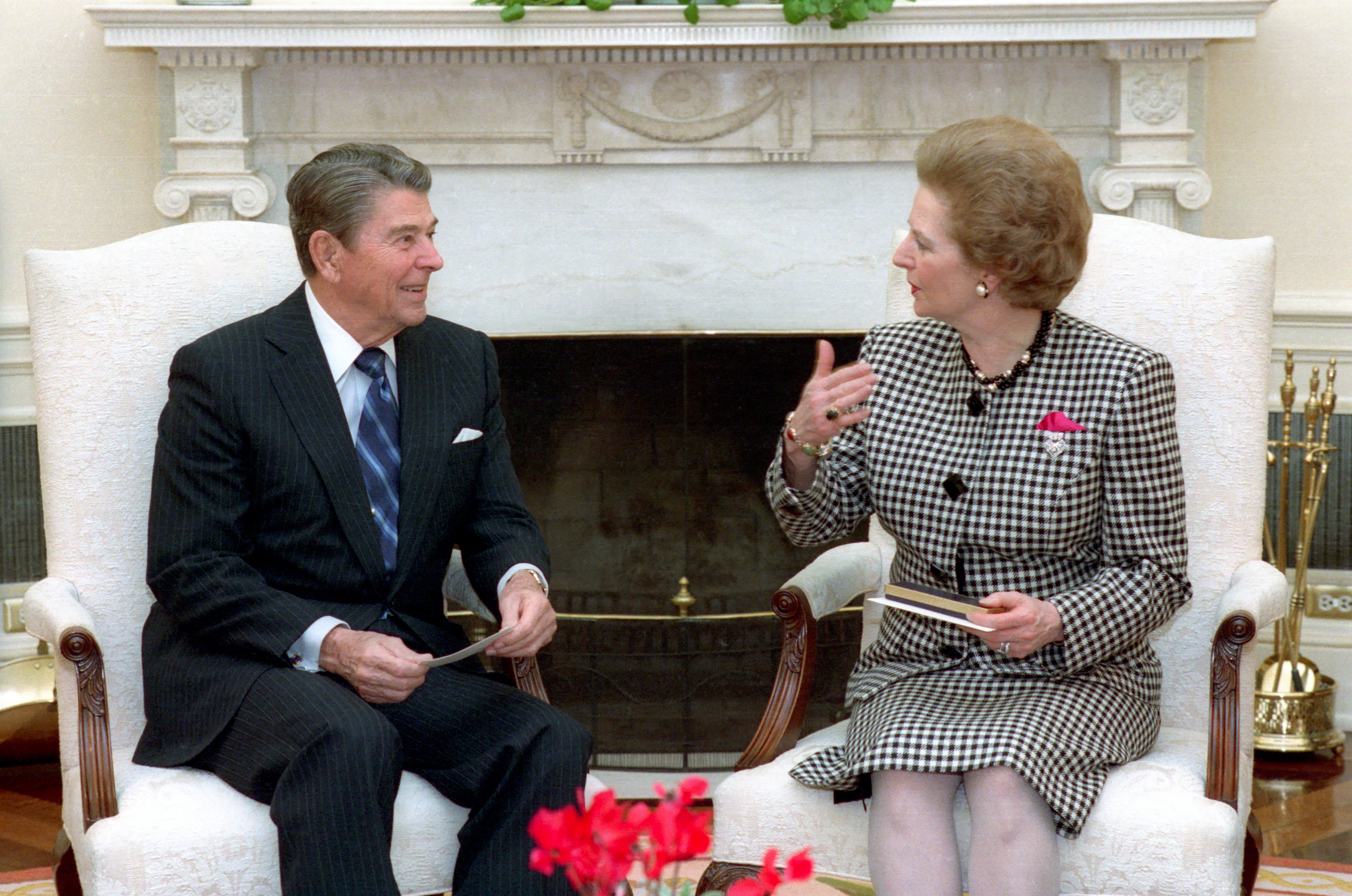
President Reagan and Prime Minister Thatcher at the White House, 16 November 1988

Thatcher appointed Lord Carrington as Foreign Secretary, 1979–82. Although unlike Thatcher he was a centrist Conservative (a "wet"), he avoided domestic affairs and got along well with the Prime Minister. The first issue was what to do with Rhodesia, where the five percent white population was determined to rule the prosperous largely-black ex-colony in the face of overwhelming international disapproval. After the collapse of the Portuguese Empire in Africa in 1975, South Africa – which had been Rhodesia's chief supporter – realized that country was a liability. Black rule was inevitable, and Carrington brokered a peaceful solution at the Lancaster House conference in 1979, attended by Rhodesia's leader Ian Smith, as well as the key black leaders Abel Muzorewa, Robert Mugabe, Joshua Nkomo, and Josiah Tongogara. The conference ended Rhodesia's Bush War. The end result was the new nation of Zimbabwe under black rule in 1980.

Thatcher's first foreign policy crisis came with the 1979 Soviet invasion of Afghanistan. She condemned the invasion, said it showed the bankruptcy of a détente policy, and helped convince some British athletes to boycott the 1980 Moscow Olympics. She gave weak support to US President Jimmy Carter who tried to punish the USSR with economic sanctions. Britain's economic situation was precarious, and most of NATO was reluctant to cut trade ties. It was reported that her government secretly supplied Saddam Hussein with military equipment as early as 1981.

Thatcher became closely aligned with the Cold War policies of United States President Ronald Reagan, based on their shared distrust of Communism. A more serious disagreement came in 1983 when Reagan did not consult with her on the invasion of Grenada. During her first year as prime minister she supported NATO's decision to deploy US nuclear cruise and Pershing II missiles in Western Europe and permitted the US to station more than 160 cruise missiles at RAF Greenham Common, starting on 14 November 1983. That decision triggered mass protests by the Campaign for Nuclear Disarmament. She bought the Trident nuclear missile submarine system from the US to replace Polaris, tripling the UK's nuclear forces at an eventual cost of more than £12 billion (at 1996–97 prices). Thatcher's preference for defence ties with the US was demonstrated in the Westland affair of January 1986, when she acted with colleagues to allow the struggling helicopter manufacturer Westland to refuse a takeover offer from a consortium which included the Italian firm Agusta in favour of the management's preferred option, a link with Sikorsky Aircraft Corporation. Defence Secretary Michael Heseltine, who had helped to assemble the consortium, resigned in protest.

On 2 April 1982 the ruling military junta in Argentina ordered the invasion of the British-controlled Falkland Islands and South Georgia, triggering the Falklands War. The subsequent crisis was "a defining moment of her [Thatcher's] premiership". At the suggestion of Harold Macmillan and Robert Armstrong, she set up and chaired a small War Cabinet (formally called ODSA, Overseas and Defence committee, South Atlantic) to take charge of the conduct of the war, which by 5–6 April had authorised and dispatched a naval task force to retake the islands. Argentina surrendered on 14 June and the operation was hailed a success, notwithstanding the deaths of 255 British servicemen and 3 Falkland Islanders. Argentinian deaths totalled 649, half of them after the nuclear-powered submarine HMS Conqueror torpedoed and sank the cruiser ARA General Belgrano on 2 May. Thatcher was criticised for the neglect of the Falklands' defence that led to the war, but overall she was praised as a highly capable and committed war leader. The "Falklands factor", an economic recovery beginning early in 1982, and a bitterly divided opposition all contributed to Thatcher's second election victory in 1983.

In September 1982 she visited China to discuss with Deng Xiaoping the sovereignty of Hong Kong after 1997. China was the first communist state Thatcher had visited and she was the first British prime minister to visit China. Throughout their meeting, she sought the PRC's agreement to a continued British presence in the territory. Deng stated that the PRC's sovereignty on Hong Kong was non-negotiable, but he was willing to settle the sovereignty issue with Britain through formal negotiations, and both governments promised to maintain Hong Kong's stability and prosperity. After the two-year negotiations, Thatcher conceded to the PRC government and signed the Sino-British Joint Declaration in Beijing in 1984, agreeing to hand over Hong Kong's sovereignty in 1997.

Thatcher stood against the sanctions imposed on South Africa by the Commonwealth and the EC. She attempted to preserve trade with South Africa while persuading the government there to abandon apartheid. Thatcher dismissed the African National Congress (ANC) in October 1987 as "a typical terrorist organisation".

Thatcher's antipathy towards European integration became more pronounced during her premiership, particularly after her third election victory in 1987. During a 1988 speech in Bruges she outlined her opposition to proposals from the European Community (EC), forerunner of the European Union, for a federal structure and increased centralisation of decision making. Thatcher and her party had supported British membership of the EC in the 1975 national referendum, but she believed that the role of the organisation should be limited to ensuring free trade and effective competition, and feared that the EC's approach was at odds with her views on smaller government and deregulation; in 1988, she remarked, "We have not successfully rolled back the frontiers of the state in Britain, only to see them re-imposed at a European level, with a European super-state exercising a new dominance from Brussels".

Thatcher was firmly opposed to the UK's membership of the Exchange Rate Mechanism, a precursor to European monetary union, believing that it would constrain the British economy, despite the urging of her Chancellor of the Exchequer Nigel Lawson and Foreign Secretary Geoffrey Howe, but she was persuaded by John Major to join in October 1990, at what proved to be too high a rate.

In April 1986, Thatcher permitted US F-111s to use Royal Air Force bases for the bombing of Libya in retaliation for the Libyan attack on Americans in Berlin, citing the right of self-defence under Article 51 of the UN Charter. Thatcher stated: "The United States has more than 330,000 members of her forces in Europe to defend our liberty. Because they are here, they are subject to terrorist attack. It is inconceivable that they should be refused the right to use American aircraft and American pilots in the inherent right of self-defence, to defend their own people." Polls suggested that fewer than one in three British citizens approved of Thatcher's decision. She was in the US on a state visit when Iraqi leader Saddam Hussein invaded neighbouring Kuwait in August 1990. During her talks with President George H. W. Bush, who had succeeded Reagan in 1989, she recommended intervention, and put pressure on Bush to deploy troops in the Middle East to drive the Iraqi Army out of Kuwait. Bush was apprehensive about the plan, prompting Thatcher to remark to him during a telephone conversation that "This was no time to go wobbly!" Thatcher's government provided military forces to the international coalition in the build-up to the Gulf War, but she had resigned by the time hostilities began on 17 January 1991.

Thatcher was one of the first Western leaders to respond warmly to reformist Soviet leader Mikhail Gorbachev. Following Reagan–Gorbachev summit meetings and reforms enacted by Gorbachev in the USSR, she declared in November 1988 that "We're not in a Cold War now", but rather in a "new relationship much wider than the Cold War ever was". She went on a state visit to the Soviet Union in 1984 and met with Gorbachev and Nikolai Ryzhkov, the Chairman of the Council of Ministers. Thatcher was initially opposed to German reunification, telling Gorbachev that it "would lead to a change to postwar borders, and we cannot allow that because such a development would undermine the stability of the whole international situation and could endanger our security". She expressed concern that a united Germany would align itself more closely with the Soviet Union and move away from NATO.

=== Recent history ===
see Foreign relations of the United Kingdom#21st century

== See also ==
- British Empire
- Historiography of the British Empire
- Commonwealth of Nations
- Edwardian era
- European Union
  - Foreign relations of the European Union
- Foreign and Commonwealth Office
- Foreign policy of William Ewart Gladstone
- History of England
- History of the United Kingdom
  - Historiography of the United Kingdom
- International relations, 1648–1814
  - International relations of the Great Powers (1814–1919)
  - Diplomatic history of World War I
  - International relations (1919–1939)
  - Diplomatic history of World War II
  - Cold War
- Kingdom of England
- Kingdom of Great Britain
- List of ambassadors and high commissioners to the United Kingdom
- Military history of the United Kingdom
- Secretary of State for Foreign and Commonwealth Affairs
- Argentina–United Kingdom relations
- Belgium–United Kingdom relations
- Canada–United Kingdom relations
  - History of Canadian foreign policy
- China–United Kingdom relations
- Denmark–United Kingdom relations
- Egypt–United Kingdom relations
- France–United Kingdom relations
- Germany–United Kingdom relations
- Greece–United Kingdom relations
- India–United Kingdom relations
  - History of Indian foreign relations
- Indonesia–United Kingdom relations
- Iran–United Kingdom relations
- United Kingdom of Great Britain and Ireland
- Israel–United Kingdom relations
- Italy–United Kingdom relations
- Japan–United Kingdom relations
- Latin America–United Kingdom relations
- Mexico–United Kingdom relations
- British foreign policy in the Middle East
- Netherlands–United Kingdom relations
- Poland–United Kingdom relations
- Portugal–United Kingdom relations
- Russia–United Kingdom relations
- Serbia–United Kingdom relations
- Spain–United Kingdom relations
- Turkey–United Kingdom relations
- Ukraine–United Kingdom relations
- United Kingdom and the United Nations
- United Kingdom–United States relations
  - Special Relationship

== Sources ==
- Aitken, Jonathan (2013). Margaret Thatcher: Power and Personality. A & C Black. ISBN 978-1-4088-3186-1.
- Campbell, John (2011). Margaret Thatcher: The Iron Lady. Vol. 2. Random House. ISBN 978-1-4464-2008-9.
- Görtemaker, Manfred, ed. (2006). Britain and Germany in the Twentieth Century. Berg. ISBN 978-1-85973-842-9.
- Hastings, Max & Jenkins, Simon (2012). The Battle for the Falklands. Macmillan. ISBN 978-0-330-53676-9.
- Jackling, Roger (2005). "The Impact of the Falklands Conflict on Defence Policy". In Badsey, Stephen; Grove, Mark & Havers, Rob (eds.). The Falklands Conflict Twenty Years On: Lessons for the Future. Routledge. ISBN 978-0-415-35029-7.
- Marr, Andrew (2009). A History of Modern Britain. Pan Books. ISBN 978-0-330-51329-6.
- Reitan, Earl A. (2003). The Thatcher Revolution: Margaret Thatcher, John Major, Tony Blair, and the Transformation of Modern Britain, 1979–2001. Rowman & Littlefield. ISBN 978-0-7425-2203-9.
- Senden, Linda (2004). Soft Law in European Community Law. Hart. ISBN 978-1-84113-432-1.
- Smith, Gordon (1989). Battles of the Falklands War. Ian Allan. ISBN 978-0-7110-1792-4. Archived from the original on 3 January 2018.
- Thatcher, Margaret (1993). The Downing Street Years. HarperCollins. ISBN 978-0-00-745663-5.
