= Riccardo Pelizzo =

- Education: University of Bologna; Johns Hopkins University (PhD)
- Scientific career
- Fields: Political science, Comparative politics, Public policy
- Workplaces: Nazarbayev University; Singapore Management University

Riccardo Pelizzo is an Italian political scientist. He is Professor and Dean of the Graduate School of Public Policy at Nazarbayev University in Kazakhstan, where he previously served as Acting Dean. He is a recipient of the Vincent Wright Memorial Prize awarded by West European Politics. His research has focused on comparative politics, legislatures, governance, public policy, and political institutions.

== Education ==
Pelizzo received a Laurea in Philosophy from the University of Bologna. He later attended the School of Advanced International Studies of Johns Hopkins University in Bologna before completing a Doctor of Philosophy (PhD) in Political Science at Johns Hopkins University in the United States.

== Career ==
Pelizzo began consulting for the World Bank in 2002 and was involved in projects relating to parliamentary governance and institutional development. He worked at the World Bank from 2011 to 2014. He later co-edited The Role of Parliament in Curbing Corruption with Rick Stapenhurst and Niall Johnston.

Pelizzo was at Singapore Management University from 2004 to 2007. In 2007, he joined the Centre for Governance and Public Policy at Griffith University, Australia, as a Research Fellow. In 2014, he joined the Graduate School of Public Policy at Nazarbayev University. At the University, he has served as Faculty Head, Vice Dean for Academic Affairs, Vice Dean for Research, Acting Dean, and currently serves as Dean.

Pelizzo serves as an Associate Editor of the academic journal Politics & Policy. He has also served on editorial boards of academic journals and has reviewed manuscripts for scholarly publications.

== Research ==
Pelizzo's work examines comparative politics, legislative studies, governance, political institutions, parliamentary oversight, democratization, corruption, and public policy. His publications include books and peer-reviewed articles on legislative oversight, political accountability, institutional development, and governance.

His academic work has also addressed governance and legislative development in Africa, Asia and the Pacific.

== Selected publications ==
=== Books ===
- Pelizzo, Riccardo; Stapenhurst, Rick; Johnston, Niall (2006). The Role of Parliament in Curbing Corruption. World Bank. ISBN 9780821367230.
- Pelizzo, Riccardo (2012). Parliamentary Oversight Tools: A Comparative Analysis. Routledge. ISBN 9780415615716.
- Pelizzo, Riccardo; Stapenhurst, Rick (2019). Corruption and Legislatures. Routledge. ISBN 9781138384262.

=== Selected journal articles ===
- Pelizzo, Riccardo (2008). "The Cartel Party and the Italian Case". Politics & Policy. doi:10.1111/j.1747-1346.2008.00117.x.
- Pelizzo, Riccardo; Stapenhurst, Rick. "Improving Democracy and Accountability in Ghana: The Importance of Parliamentary Oversight Tools". Governance. doi:10.1111/j.1468-0491.2012.01573.x.
- Dosmaganbetov, A.; Pelizzo, Riccardo (2025). "Countering Corruption Through Transparency: The Extractive Industries Transparency Initiative in Sub-Saharan Africa". World Affairs. doi:10.1002/waf2.70044.
- Aidossov, N.; Nazarbek, S.; Pelizzo, Riccardo (2025). "Trust, Conspiracy Theory, and COVID-19 Vaccination Intention in Kazakhstan". Cogent Social Sciences. doi:10.1080/23311886.2025.2583405.

== Awards and honours ==
Pelizzo received the Vincent Wright Memorial Prize awarded by West European Politics. He has also received the Medal for Contribution to the Development of Science from Kazakhstan's Ministry of Education and Science.
