= Gordon Smith (academic) =

British political scholar (1927–2009)

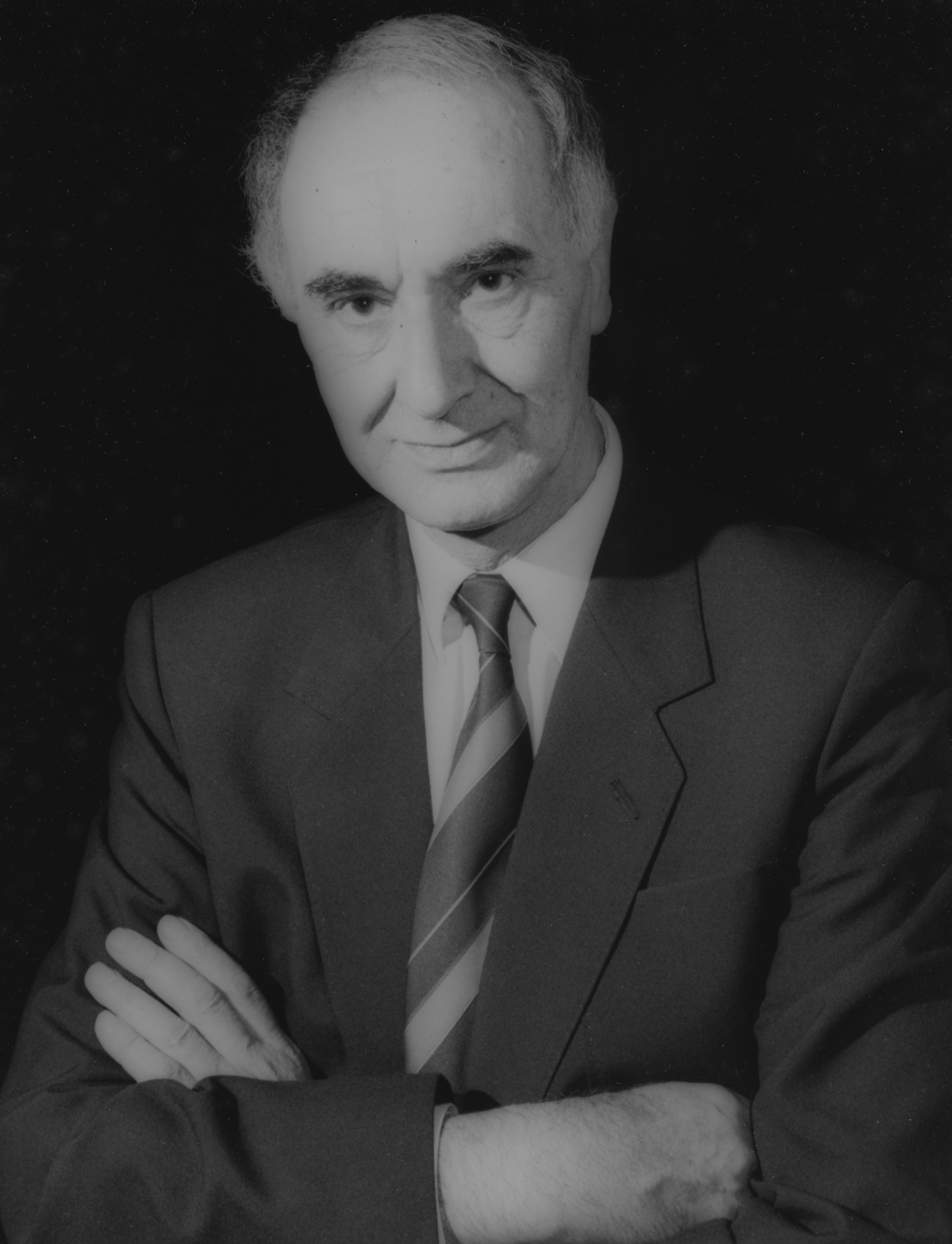
Gordon Smith, c. 1990

Gordon Smith (1927–2009) was a British lecturer, professor and political scholar in the field of German and comparative European politics, who served as Head of Department for Government at the London School of Economics. He is said to have been one of Britain's leading scholars of comparative European politics.

== Life ==
Having been stationed by the British army in Hamburg following the end of World War II, Smith completed his Economics (BSc) degree at the London School of Economics upon his return to London. Following several years in the personnel management of private companies and teaching civics to day-release apprentices at Bournemouth Municipal College, Smith completed a part-time doctorate on the political system of the Federal Republic of Germany in 1964. After having been appointed to a lectureship at London North East Polytechnic (today the University of East London), he published his first book, Politics in Western Europe, wherein a comparison of the political systems of the 19 Western European countries was presented. Due to a heightened recognition of the publication and positive reception, Smith was appointed as a senior lecturer at the LSE thereafter, and served a spell as the Head of Department for Government.

Smith collaborated with Vincent Wright, Klaus Goetz and Peter Mair to establish the academic journal West European Politics in 1978. Smith also co-founded the journal German Politics and helped establish the European Political Science Research Consortium and the Association for the Study of German Politics, whose chairman he was from 1986 to 1988. He was later elected an honorary vice-chairman. He rejected the opinion of some colleagues that political processes can be explained through generalizations; instead, he viewed the history and culture of a country indispensable and essential in understanding political developments and changes.

== The Vincent Wright and Gordon Smith Memorial Prize ==
The Vincent Wright Memorial Prize was established in 1999 to honour the memory of Vincent Wright. Following the untimely death of Smith in 2009, the award was renamed to the Vincent Wright and Gordon Smith Memorial Prize. Two prizes are awarded annually on the recommendation of members of the editorial advisory board for the best articles published in the journal during the preceding year.

== Publications ==
=== Books ===
- Politics in Western Europe: A comparative analysis, 1972 (ISBN 0-435-83785-0); 5. 1989 (ISBN 0-8419-1263-7)
- Democracy in Western Germany. Parties and politics in the Federal Republic, 1979 (ISBN 0-435-83790-7); 3. 1986 (ISBN 0-566-05157-5)
- As editor, with William E. Paterson: The West German model. Perspectives on a stable state, 1981 (ISBN 0-7146-3180-9)
- As editor, with Herbert Döring: Party government and political culture in Western Germany, 1982 (ISBN 0-312-59760-6)
- As editor: Developments in West German politics, 1989 (ISBN 0-333-47368-X)
- As editor, with Peter Mair: Understanding party system change in Western Europe, 1990 (ISBN 0-7146-3381-X)
- As editor: Developments in German politics, 1992 (ISBN 0-8223-1266-2)

Gordon Smith was, alongside Vincent Wright, editor of the journal West European Politics (from 1978, ISSN 0140-2382). Together with a group of political scientists, he participated in the founding of the journal German Politics in 1992 (ISSN 0964-4008).

== Commemorative publications ==
- Continuity and change in German politics. Beyond the politics of centrality? A Festschrift for Gordon Smith, ed. Stephen Padgett and Thomas Poguntke, 2002. A commemorative publication dedicated to Smith entailing a bibliography of Smith's publications.
