= West European Politics =

- Discipline: Comparative politics
- Language: English
- Edited by: Peter Mair, Klaus Goetz

Publication details
- History: 1978-present
- Publisher: Routledge
- Frequency: Bimonthly
- Impact factor: 1.464 (2015)

Standard abbreviations
- ISO 4: West Eur. Politics
- NLM: West Eur Polit

Indexing
- ISSN: 0140-2382 (print); 1743-9655 (web)
- LCCN: 80641468
- OCLC no.: 473894221

Links
- Journal homepage; Online access; Online archive

West European Politics is a peer-reviewed academic journal of comparative politics focusing on Western Europe. It was established in 1978 and serves as one of the main publication venues in that field. Its founding editors-in-chief were Vincent Wright and Gordon Smith; the current editors are Klaus Goetz, Anand Menon, and Wolfgang C. Müller. According to the Journal Citation Reports, the journal has a 2015 impact factor of 1.464, ranking it 36th out of 163 journals in the category "Political Science".

== Vincent Wright Memorial Prize ==
The Vincent Wright Memorial Prize was established in 1999 to honour the memory of Vincent Wright. Two prizes are awarded annually based on the recommendation from members of the editorial advisory board for the best articles published in the journal during the preceding year.

== See also ==
- List of political science journals
