= Left-libertarianism =

Political philosophy

Left-libertarianism, also known as left-wing libertarianism, is a political philosophy and type of libertarianism that stresses both individual freedom and social equality. Left-libertarianism represents several related yet distinct approaches to political and social theory. Its classical usage refers to anti-authoritarian varieties of left-wing politics such as anarchism, especially social anarchism.

While right-libertarianism is widely seen as synonymous with libertarianism in the United States, left-libertarianism is the predominant form of libertarianism in Europe. While left-libertarianism is used to refer to libertarian socialism, in the United States, left-libertarianism is also used as a term used for the left wing of the American libertarian movement, including the political positions associated with academic philosophers Hillel Steiner, Philippe Van Parijs, and Peter Vallentyne that combine self-ownership with an egalitarian approach to natural resources and market anarchists such as Samuel Edward Konkin III and Roderick T. Long. Although libertarianism in the United States has become associated with classical liberalism and minarchism, with right-libertarianism being more known than left-libertarianism, political usage of the term libertarianism until then was associated exclusively with anti-capitalism, libertarian socialism, and social anarchism; in most parts of the world, such an association still predominates.

While all libertarians begin with a conception of personal autonomy from which they argue in favor of civil liberties and a reduction or elimination of the state, left-libertarianism encompasses those libertarian beliefs that claim the Earth's natural resources belong to everyone in an egalitarian manner, either unowned or owned collectively. Left-libertarian views on the state usually range from support for a decentralised, participatory and limited government, to anarchism, which advocates for the government-like structures to be abolished entirely.

== Terminology ==
Libertarianism is a philosophy that advocates for freedom, whether political, economical or metaphysical. Although older political movements have been identified as libertarian (for example, Marxist historian E.P. Thompson argued in 1979 that "the English left-libertarian tradition can be traced back to the Levellers, Diggers and the Chartists"), the political definition of the term "libertarian" (from the French: libertaire) was coined by the French anarchist communist Joseph Déjacque in 1857, whereafter libertarianism became synonymous with anarchism. The term was widely used by anarchists until the 1970s, when libertarianism first started to be associated with a radical free market philosophy, particularly in the United States.

The oldest, traditional, definition of "left-libertarianism" used it synonymously with social anarchism. Seeking to distinguish themselves from the new generation of free-market libertarians, social anarchists began referring to themselves as "left-libertarians", while the new adoptees of the term became known as "right-libertarians". This usage is also applied to libertarian socialists such as William Morris or Fenner Brockway and libertarian Marxists such as Cornelius Castoriadis.

At the same time as social anarchists began using the term to distinguish themselves from free-market libertarians, some of the advocates of free market economics that were associated with the New Left, including Roy Childs and Samuel Konkin, also began referring to themselves as "left-libertarians" in order to highlight themselves as the left-wing of the new free-market libertarian movement. As anti-capitalist advocates of free-market economics, they used the term "left-libertarian" in order to distinguish themselves from the right-wing advocates of libertarian capitalism.

Left libertarianism is defined a little differently by many European political scientists, in a usage introduced by Herbert Kitschelt in 1989. Left libertarian parties emphasise notions of internal party democracy and bottom-up participation. Green parties and radical left parties are often grouped together as "left-libertarian" parties by political scientists.

For political scientists Jan Jämte and Adrienne Sörbom,

The term radical left-libertarianism is used as an umbrella concept, gathering different strands of anti-authoritarian forms of socialism, stressing both anti-capitalist and anti-statist views, as well as the need to build a society based on voluntary forms of cooperation. Presently, such movements also often articulate strong criticism of what are seen as other forms of oppression, such as sexism, racism and homophobia, thus making the movements potential allies to a wider section of movement cultures. The anarchist ideology and movement are firmly rooted within this broad ideational category, together with other branches of left-libertarianism such as council communism, anarcho-syndicalism or autonomism.

The term "radical left-libertarian movements" (RLLMs) is used by many political scientists to refer to anarchists, autonomists and others in the alternative cultures and movements that arose out of the new social movements from the 1960s onwards, such as those involved in squatting and militant anti-fascism. For example, in a comparative study of left libertarianism in Sweden and Poland, Piotrowski and Wennerhag state that

activists from anarchist, autonomist, and anarcho-syndicalist groups, whose political orientations include both libertarian Marxist and anarchist perspectives,… are the principal actors within the radical left-libertarian movement in the countries of our study. All of these groups are based on ideologies that express anti-capitalist, anti-authoritarian/anti-state, anti-racist/antifascist and pro-direct/participatory democracy stances from a radical left-libertarian standpoint (Katsiaficas 1997; Curran 2006; Romanos 2013). Historically, such movement activism can be connected to those ideologies and strategies that emerged within two broader "movement families" (cf. della Porta and Rucht 1995, 230 ff.): namely, the labor movement (in particular during the late 19th and early 20th century) and the "new left" or "new social movements" of the 1960s and onwards. Within these movement families, the groups we analyze here have often been thought to constitute the "radical flank" (cf. Haines 2013).

According to sociologist Jennifer Carlson, left-libertarianism is one of the three main branches of libertarian political philosophy, alongside right-libertarianism, a capitalist philosophy that defends strong private property rights; and socialist libertarianism, an anti-capitalist philosophy that opposes the concentration of wealth. By the turn of the 21st century, some analytic philosophers had also adopted the label of "left-libertarianism". This contemporary model of left-libertarianism, associated mainly with Peter Vallentyne and Hillel Steiner, distinguishes itself from right-libertarianism in its advocacy of the social ownership and equitable distribution of natural resources, while also upholding the libertarian principle of self-ownership.

== Schools of thought ==
=== Social anarchism ===
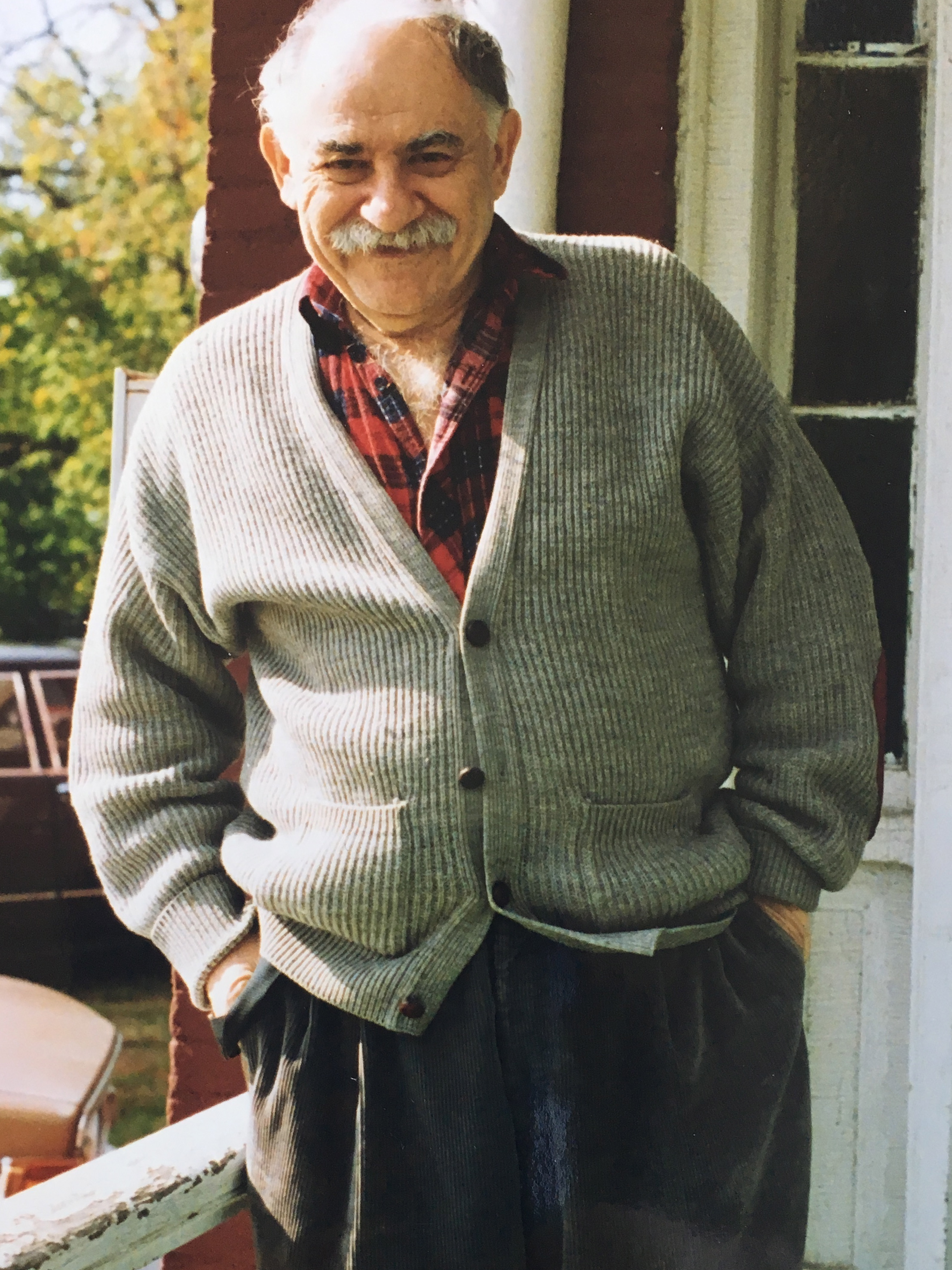
Murray Bookchin, a left-libertarian (formerly) of the social anarchist school

In its oldest form, "left-libertarianism" was used synonymously with social anarchism. Although social anarchism and other forms of left-libertarianism share similar roots and concerns, social anarchism has distinguished itself as a distinct ideological tradition, due to its fundamental rejection of the state. In contrast to individualist tendencies, social anarchism rejects private property and market relations, which they believe will be eliminated with the abolition of the state.

Social anarchism, originally associated with the libertarianism of Joseph Déjacque, has historically encompassed collectivist anarchism, anarchist communism and anarcho-syndicalism; each of which became influential tendencies in the Russian and Spanish Revolutions.

The contemporary left-libertarian Murray Bookchin advocated for the replacement of the state with a libertarian communist society, which he saw as a decentralized confederation of municipalities, in which decisions would be made by direct democracy. Bookchin was also harshly critical of individualist anarchism, which he held responsible for the failure of left-libertarianism to take a prominent place in public discourse.

=== New social movements ===
In 1960s Germany, the libertarian left was a dominant current in the extra-parliamentary opposition, "Außerparlamentarische Opposition" (ApO).

The punk scene provoked an expansion of the libertarian left: "a broader 'libertarian left' influence can be discerned in punk and post-punk's engagement with gender relations, sexuality, consumerism, imperialism and so forth".

Northern Europe saw an upsurge in radical left-libertarian activism, squatting and urban unrest at the turn of the 1980s. From this point until the late 2010s, "the main tendency in radical left activism shifted from party-based Marxism-Leninism to network-based, direct-action activism based on libertarian socialist ideals… shifting [in this period] from direct-action networks that engaged in a variety of political issue—anti-fascism, anti-imperialism, feminism, animal rights, etc.—to more 'conventional' networks of organizations and initiatives through which activists intervened in local politics and neighborhood and workplace conflicts. The same period also saw the [radical left libertarian movements] become less disruptive and violent, in favor of tactical pragmatism and conventional forms of protest".

=== Free-market anti-capitalism ===
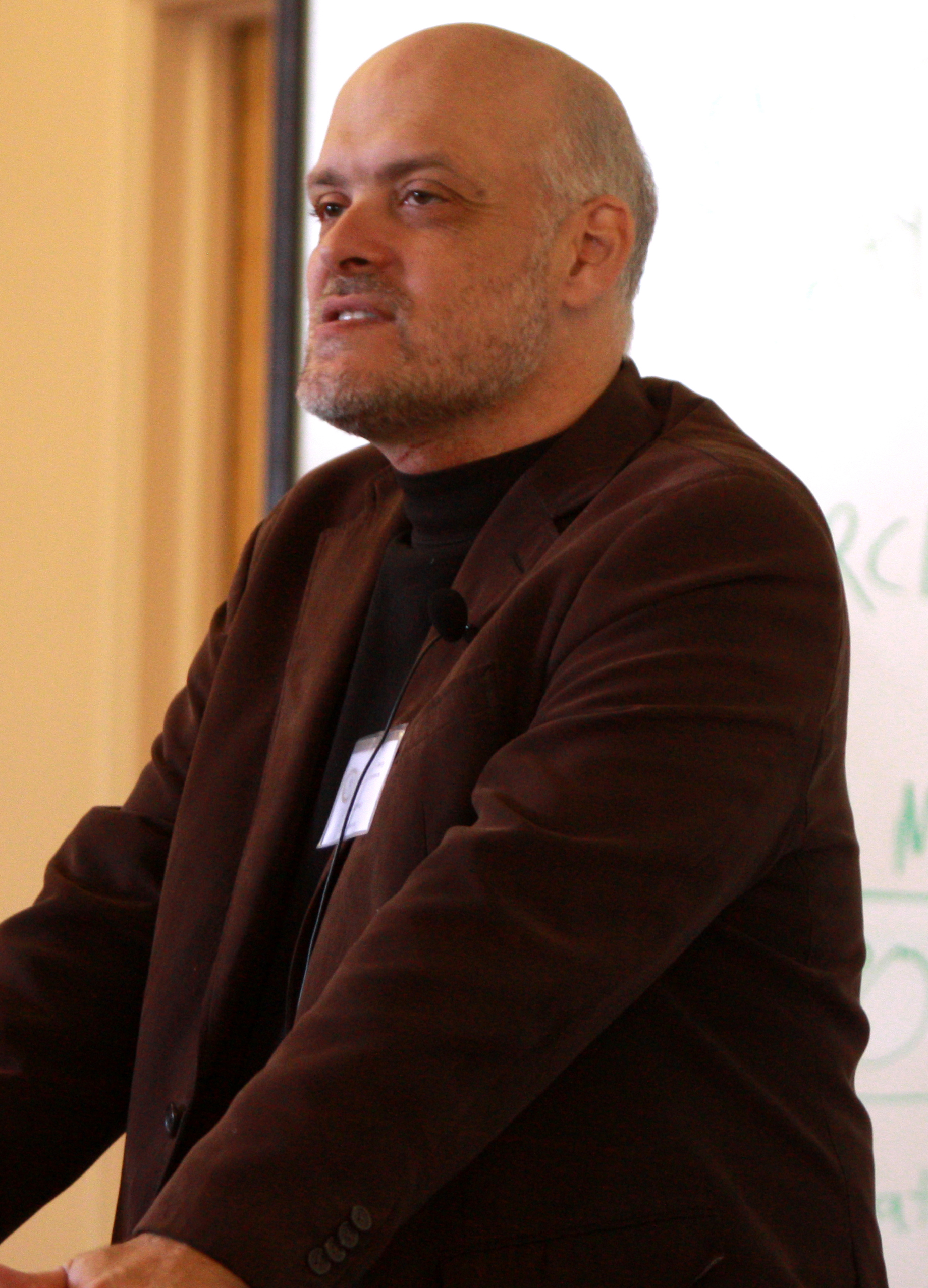
Gary Chartier, a left-libertarian of the free-market anti-capitalist school

Alongside social anarchists, left-wing proponents of free-market economics have associated themselves with left-libertarianism, also partly influenced by the New Left. This post-classical definition has been used synonymously with the free-market anti-capitalism (a.k.a. left-wing market anarchism) advocated by Kevin Carson, Gary Chartier, and Charles W. Johnson, who together formed the Alliance of the Libertarian Left and the subsequent Center for a Stateless Society. Drawing from the views of American individualist anarchists such as Benjamin Tucker and Lysander Spooner, left-wing market anarchists defend the use of free markets and private property, which they consider to have an "essential coordinating role" in society. Free-market anti-capitalists hold market intervention responsible for capitalist control of the means of production, a situation they believe will be solved by the introduction of free competition. Building on Tucker's ideas, Kevin Carson has also defended the labor theory of value and occupancy-and-use land ownership, although not all free-market anti-capitalists agree with these positions. Like social anarchists and unlike many right-libertarians, left-wing market anarchists are opposed to capitalism, viewing it as a form of oppression along with racism and sexism; they consider this anti-oppression politics to be an integral part of left-libertarianism.

=== Green politics and left libertarian parties ===
The green movement, especially its more left-wing factions, is often described by political scientists as left-libertarian.

In the wake of the new social movements (especially the ecology and anti-nuclear movements) of the 1970s and 1980s, many left libertarian parties (sometimes called movement parties) were formed, including green parties, which maintained a relationship with these social movements. Political scientists Santos and Mercea argue that, in recent years, "the rise of movement parties across Europe has disrupted traditional notions of party politics and opened up new avenues for citizen engagement and political mobilisation. Movement parties are the reflection of a wider socio-political transformation of increasing interconnection between electoral and non-electoral politics". For them, green/left-libertarian movement parties "embody a generational gap in political participation, as they utilise both electoral and non-electoral engagement to express their post-industrial demands... [Their] voters tend to be younger and more educated and engage more in online political activities."

According to Herbert Kitschelt, left libertarian parties are "post-materialist" in that they reject the primary status of economic issues, and argue that "the predominance of markets and bureaucracies must be rolled back in favor of social solidarity relations and participatory institutions". He posits that the strong commitment to direct participation leads to the weakness (or even absence) of formal structurel, centralized organization, leadership and hierarchy, and "a sometimes chaotic ‘assembly’ organizational style (as best illustrated by the water-balloon attack on Foreign Minister Joshka Fischer at the 1999 congress of the German Greens)."

For example, between 1984 and 1986, ecologists worked together with anarchists and libertarians in Greece's Green Alternative Movement. while the Dutch GroenLinks moved from socialism to left libertarianism in the early 1990s. Political scientists see European political parties such as Ecolo and Groen in Belgium, Alliance 90/The Greens in Germany, or the Green Progressive Accord and GroenLinks in the Netherlands as coming out of the New Left and emphasizing spontaneous self-organisation, participatory democracy, decentralization and voluntarism, being contrasted to the bureaucratic or statist approach. Similarly, political scientist Ariadne Vromen has described the Australian Greens as having a "clear left-libertarian ideological base." Examples of left libertarian parties given by Kitschelt and Hellemans in 1990 were Agalev and Ecolo; Kittschelt's term was applied to the Green Party of England and Wales in 2008; examples given by Santos and Mercea more recently are Denmark's Alternativet, Germany's Bündis 90/Die Grünen, in Hungary LMP – Hungary's Green Party and Dialogue – The Greens' Party, and the UK's Green Party, Scottish Greens and Sinn Féin.

Such parties attempt to apply left-libertarian ideas to a more pragmatic system of democratic governance as opposed to contemporary individualist or socialist libertarianism. Typically, there is a tension between the left-libertarian inheritance and demands of pragmatism. For example, Margit Mayer and John Ely describe the German Greens as "remain[ing] connected to the left-libertarian movement milieus in the topics it addresses, its political style, and the omnipresence of movement discourse" while also pursuing practical strategies for party power.

A new wave of left libertarian movement parties emerged from the alterglobalisation and anti-austerity movements from the late 1990s. In Portugal, the Left Bloc emerged in the late 1990s from the anti-austerity movement, and is inspired by the libertarian left. Greece's Synaspismos and its successor Syriza came from a similar background. In Turkey, Ufuk Uras of the Party of the Greens and the Left Future identifies as a left-libertarian. Ufuk Uras identifies as a left libertarian.

=== Contemporary left-libertarian philosophy ===
In contrast to right-libertarianism and libertarian socialism, left-libertarianism holds that individuals should have no exclusive right to the exploitation of natural resources, instead advocating for an equitable distribution of resources, while also insisting on the protection of personal property rights. Contemporary left-libertarian scholars such as David Ellerman, Michael Otsuka, Hillel Steiner, Peter Vallentyne and Philippe Van Parijs root an economic egalitarianism in the classical liberal concepts of self-ownership and land appropriation, combined with geoist or physiocratic views regarding the ownership of land and natural resources (e.g. those of Henry George and John Locke). Their intellectual forebears include Henry George, Thomas Paine, and Herbert Spencer. Classical economists such as Henry George, John Stuart Mill, the early writings of Herbert Spencer, among others, "provided the basis for the further development of the left libertarian perspective." Most left-libertarians of this tradition support some form of economic rent redistribution on the grounds that each individual is entitled to an equal share of natural resources and argue for the desirability of state social welfare programs.

Scholars representing this school of left-libertarianism often understand their position in contrast to right-libertarians, who maintain that there are no fair share constraints on use or appropriation that individuals have the power to appropriate unowned things by claiming them (usually by mixing their labor with them) and deny any other conditions or considerations are relevant and that there is no justification for the state to redistribute resources to the needy or to overcome market failures. A number of left-libertarians of this school argue for the desirability of some state social welfare programs.

==== Views on private property ====
Left-libertarians generally uphold self-ownership and oppose strong private property rights; instead, they support the egalitarian distribution of natural resources. Left-libertarians of this school hold that it is illegitimate for anyone to claim private ownership of natural resources to the detriment of others; as such, they are skeptical of, or fully against, private ownership of natural resources, arguing, in contrast to right-libertarians, that neither claiming nor mixing one's labor with natural resources is enough to generate full private property rights, and they maintain that natural resources should be held in an egalitarian manner, either unowned or owned collectively. Those left-libertarians who are more lenient towards private property support different property norms and theories, such as usufruct or under the condition that recompense is offered to the local or even global community.

For left libertarians of this school, unappropriated natural resources are either unowned or owned in common and private appropriation is only legitimate if everyone can appropriate an equal amount or if private appropriation is taxed to compensate those who are excluded from natural resources.

Political scientist Peter Mclaverty notes it has been argued that socialist values are incompatible with the concept of self-ownership when this concept is considered "the core feature of libertarianism" and socialism is defined as holding "that we are social beings, that society should be organised, and individuals should act, so as to promote the common good, that we should strive to achieve social equality and promote democracy, community and solidarity." However, political philosopher Nicholas Vrousalis has also argued that "property rights [...] do not pass judgment as to what rights individuals have to their own person [...] [and] to the external world" and that "the nineteenth-century egalitarian libertarians were not misguided in thinking that a thoroughly libertarian form of communism is possible at the level of principle."

Left-libertarians of the Carson–Long left-libertarianism school typically endorse the labor-based property rights that contemporary left-libertarian philosophers reject, but they hold that implementing such rights would have radical rather than conservative consequences.

==== Views on economics and the social state ====
These left-libertarians support some form of income redistribution on the grounds of a claim by each individual to be entitled to an equal share of natural resources. Some left-libertarians make a libertarian reading of progressive and social-democratic economics to advocate a universal basic income. Building on Michael Otsuka's conception of "robust libertarian self-ownership", Karl Widerquist argues that a universal basic income must be large enough to maintain individual independence regardless of the market value of resources because people in contemporary society have been denied direct access to enough resources with which they could otherwise maintain their existence in the absence of interference by people who control access to resources.

== See also ==
- Cellular democracy
- Civil libertarianism
- Cultural liberalism
- Cultural radicalism
- Drug liberalization
- Grassroots democracy
- Individualist feminism
- Left-libertarians (category)
- Libertarian Democrat
- Libertarian municipalism
- Libertarian paternalism
- Libertarian transhumanism
- Libertarianism in the United States
- Lockean proviso
- Market socialism
- Neoclassical liberalism
- Outline of libertarianism
- Radical movement
- Refusal of work

== Bibliography ==
- Bookchin, Murray (1995). Social Anarchism or Lifestyle Anarchism: The Unbridgeable Chasm. AK Press. pp. 49–61. ISBN 1-873176-83-X.
- Carlson, Jennifer D. (2012). "Libertarianism". In Miller, Wilbur R. (ed.). The Social History of Crime and Punishment in America: An Encyclopedia. Sage Publications. pp. 1005–1009. ISBN 978-1-4129-8876-6.
- Fried, Barbara H. (Winter 2004). "Left-Libertarianism: A Review Essay". Philosophy & Public Affairs. 32 (1): 66–92. doi:10.1111/j.1467-6486.2004.00005.x. JSTOR 3557982.
- Fried, Barbara H. (2020). "Left-Libertarianism". Facing Up to Scarcity: The Logic and Limits of Nonconsequentialist Thought. Oxford: Oxford University Press. pp. 176–196. ISBN 978-0-19-884787-8.
- Goodway, David (2006). Anarchist Seeds Beneath the Snow: Left-libertarian Thought and British Writers from William Morris to Colin Ward. Liverpool University Press. ISBN 978-1-84631-025-6.
- Long, Roderick T. (2012). "Anarchism". In Gaus, Gerald F.; D'Agostino, Fred (eds.). The Routledge Companion to Social and Political Philosophy. Taylor & Francis Group. pp. 217–230. ISBN 978-0-415-87456-4.
- Long, Roderick T. (2017). "Anarchism and Libertarianism". In Jun, Nathan (ed.). Brill's Companion to Anarchism and Philosophy. Leiden: Brill. pp. 285–317. doi:10.1163/9789004356894_012. ISBN 978-90-04-35689-4.
- Long, Roderick T. (2021). "The Anarchist Landscape". In Chartier, Gary; Van Schoelandt, Chad (eds.). The Routledge Handbook of Anarchy and Anarchist Thought. Routledge. pp. 28–38. doi:10.4324/9781315185255-2. ISBN 978-1-315-18525-5.
- Kymlicka, Will (2005) [1995]. "libertarianism, left-". In Honderich, Ted (ed.). The Oxford Companion to Philosophy (2nd ed.). New York City: Oxford University Press. pp. 516–617. ISBN 0-19-926479-1.
- Marshall, Peter H. (2008) [1992]. Demanding the Impossible: A History of Anarchism. London: Harper Perennial. ISBN 978-0-00-686245-1. OCLC 218212571.
- Vallentyne, Peter (2012). "Left-Libertarianism". In Estlund, David (ed.). The Oxford Handbook of Political Philosophy. Oxford University Press. pp. 152–168. doi:10.1093/oxfordhb/9780195376692.013.0008. ISBN 9780199968886.
