= Fred Foldvary =

American economist (1946–2021)

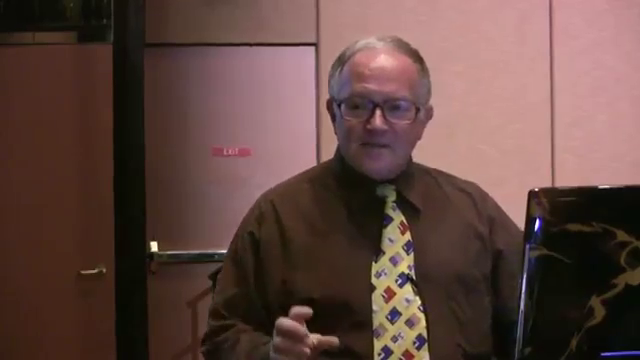
- Foldvary giving a lecture in 2010
- Born: May 11, 1946
- Died: June 5, 2021 (aged 75)
- Education: George Mason University (PhD)
- Occupations: Writer and academic
- Employer: Santa Clara University

Fred Emanuel Foldvary (May 11, 1946 – June 5, 2021) was an American economist. He was a lecturer in economics at San Jose State University, California, and a research fellow at the Independent Institute. He previously taught at Santa Clara University and other colleges. He was also a commentator and senior editor for the online journal The Progress Report and an associate editor of the online journal Econ Journal Watch. He served on the board of directors for the Robert Schalkenbach Foundation.

== Work ==
In his PhD dissertation (George Mason University, 1992) titled "Public Goods and Private Communities", Foldvary applied the theory of public goods and industrial organization to refute the concept of market failure, including case studies of several types of private communities. His research interests included ethics, governance, land economics, and public finance.

His support of geolibertarianism (a libertarian ideology which embraces the Georgist philosophy of property) and his advocacy of civil liberties and free markets have gained him a place of high visibility in the geolibertarian movement. In the 2000 U.S. House of Representatives elections, he ran for Congress in California's 9th district as a Libertarian. He received 3.3% of the total vote to finish third among the four candidates on the ballot.

Foldvary wrote on topics including ending slavery in chocolate plantations; a green tax shift to protect the environment while enhancing the economy; reforming democracy with small-group voting; and solving territorial conflict with confederations and the payment of rent for occupied land. Three central and recurring themes of Foldvary's writing are the universal ethic, cellular democracy, and public revenue from land rent.

Foldvary focused on short economic cycles of four years and major cycles of 18–20 years. In 1998, he predicted the next major economic downturn would be around 2008, as well as a short downturn in 1999 or 2000 due to the Year 2000 problem. In 2007, Foldvary published a booklet entitled The Depression of 2008. In a 2011 paper, Mason Gaffney, Professor of Economics at UC Riverside, criticized the economic community for excluding and ignoring Foldvary.

== Personal life ==
Foldvary lived in the San Francisco Bay Area in California.

== Death ==
Foldvary died, aged 75, on June 5, 2021.

== Books ==
- The Soul of Liberty (1980) The Gutenberg Press. ISBN 0-9603872-1-8.
- Public Goods and Private Communities (1994) Edward Elgar Publishing ISBN 1-85278-951-4.
- Beyond Neoclassical Economics (1996) Edward Elgar Publishing ISBN 1-85898-395-9.
- Dictionary of Free Market Economics (1998) Edward Elgar Publishing ISBN 1-85898-432-7.
- The Half-Life of Policy Rationales: How Technology Affects Old Policy Issues (ed., with Daniel Klein, 2003) ISBN 0-8147-4777-9.
- The Depression of 2008 (2007) The Gutenberg Press. ISBN 0-9603872-0-X.

== See also ==
- Cellular democracy
- Free banking
- Georgism
- Grassroots democracy
- Geolibertarianism
- Green libertarianism
- Land value tax
- Libertarian Party of California
- Neoclassical liberalism
- Subsidiarity
