= Neoclassical liberalism =

American libertarian philosophy

Neoclassical liberalism (alternatively spelled neo-classical liberalism (Note: British researcher Alan James Mayne use the spelling with hyphenation.) or known as new classical liberalism (Note: Political scientist Ellen Grigsby also uses "new classical liberals" to refer to the grouping.)) is a tradition of the liberal thought that, with the premises of John Locke's classical liberalism applied to industrialized societies, stands in opposition to the welfare state and social liberalism.

In the United States, the Arizona School of liberalism, also referred to as "bleeding-heart libertarianism", adopted the term neoclassical liberal to advance certain ideas of Chicago School economist Milton Friedman within the American libertarian movement, including the school voucher system and the negative income tax.

== History ==
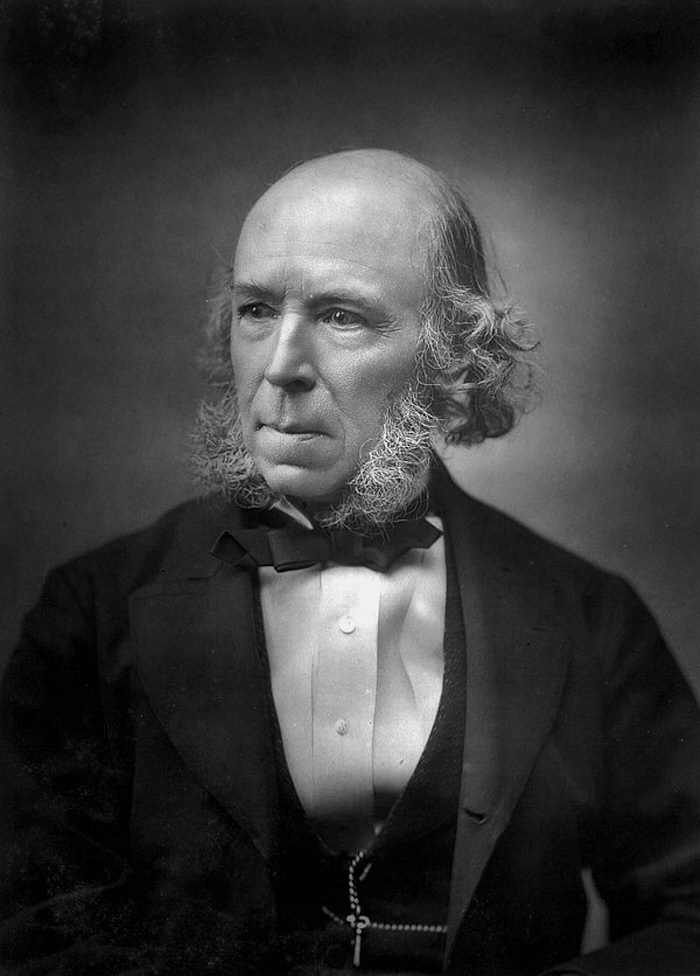
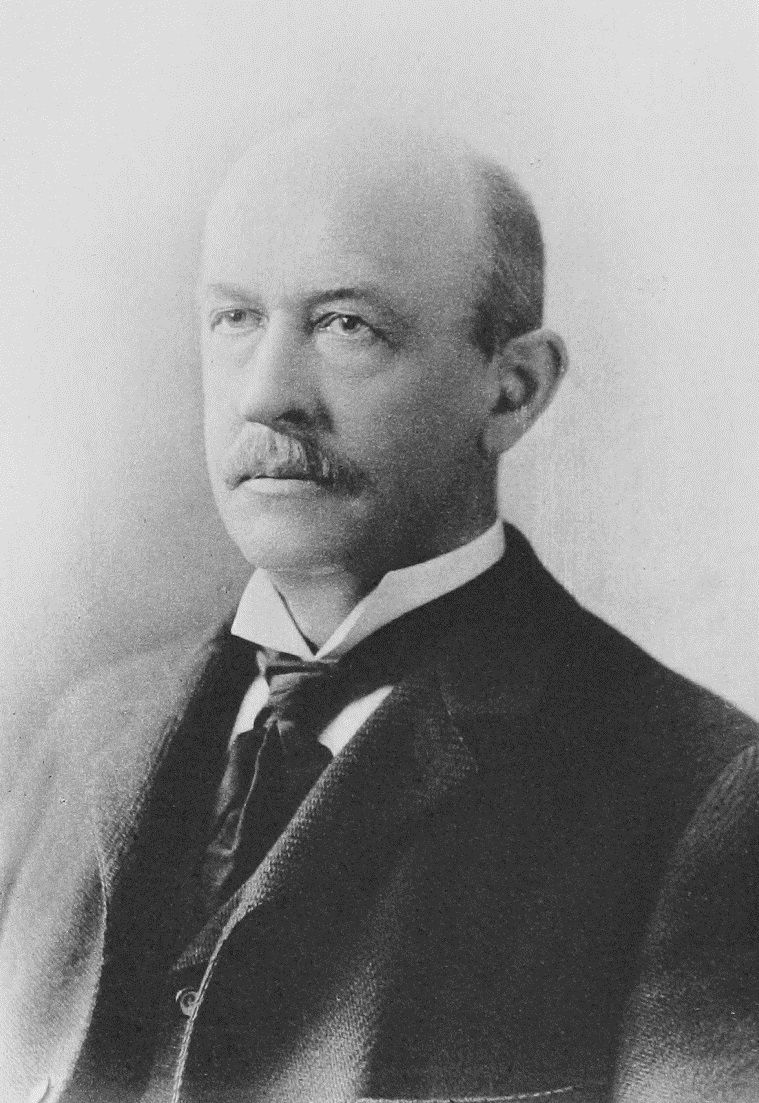
Herbert Spencer (left) and William Graham Sumner (right), who have greatly influenced the development of neoclassical liberalism.

=== 19th century neoclassical liberalism (c. 1840 – c. 1900) ===
In the late 19th century, the rise of social liberalism, championed by Thomas Hill Green, sparked a division within the liberal movement. On one side were the social liberals (also known as welfare liberals (Note: At the time, social liberals were called "new liberals" in the U.K.)), who advocated for a more interventionist state and social justice based approach. On the other side, a faction of liberals remained committed to laissez-faire economics. Even in the face of industrialization (Note: British philosopher John Locke wrote his ideas prior to the First Industrial Revolution (c. 1760 – c. 1840)), neoclassical liberals contended that their understanding of liberalism, as outlined by the British philosopher John Locke in his Second Treatise of Government of 1690, remained the most effective approach for addressing social and economic concerns.

British sociologist Herbert Spencer introduced the concept of "survival of the fittest". In his publication titled The Proper Sphere of Government, Spencer contended that individuals possess only two natural rights: the right to life and the right to property. Similar to the views of American William Graham Sumner, Spencer held the belief that governmental involvement in economic matters (referred to as officialism) would result in social parasitism to the detriment of the working population. Consequently, he was against trade regulations, public schooling, state-sponsored religions, social welfare, and state-owned transportation systems.

American social scientist William G. Sumner contended that the proper role of government was the protection of "the property of men and the honor of women", government was to be a rationalistic response of individuals to defend property rights and the purpose was to be merely "contractualistic".

=== Mid-20th century right-libertarianism (1943–1980s) ===
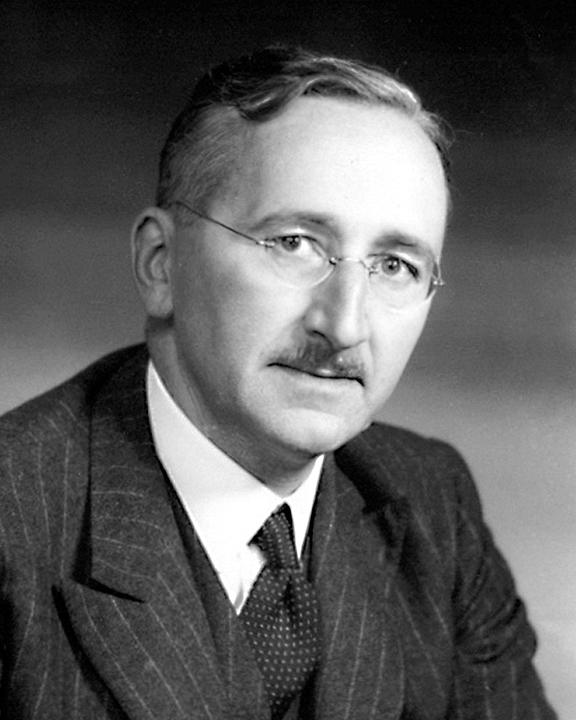
Austrian-British economist F. A. Hayek (1899–1992)

Neoclassical liberalism re-emerged mainly in the post-World War II era, when modern liberalism was the main form of liberalism and Keynesianism and social democracy were the dominant ideologies in the Western world. After Franklin Delano Roosevelt's New Deal (1933–1944), which contributed to the expansion of the welfare state in the United States, economists such as Friedrich von Hayek (1899–1992) and Milton Friedman (1912–2006) began to reintroduce neoclassical liberal policies as alternatives to Roosevelt's social liberalism.

The U.S. libertarian movement of the late 20th century is seen as a successor to neoclassical liberalism. According to Ellen Grigsby, arguments of contemporary neoclassical liberal thought are present in the philosophy of Robert Nozick and in the party platform of the American Libertarian Party.

=== 21st-century neoclassical liberals ===
Contemporary neoclassical liberals have tried to expunge the social Darwinistic implications of neoclassical liberal theory, the legacy of Spencer and Sumner, although they continue to advocate on behalf of the benefits of minimal state intervention and liberty for self-interested individuals.

==== Bleeding-heart libertarians ====
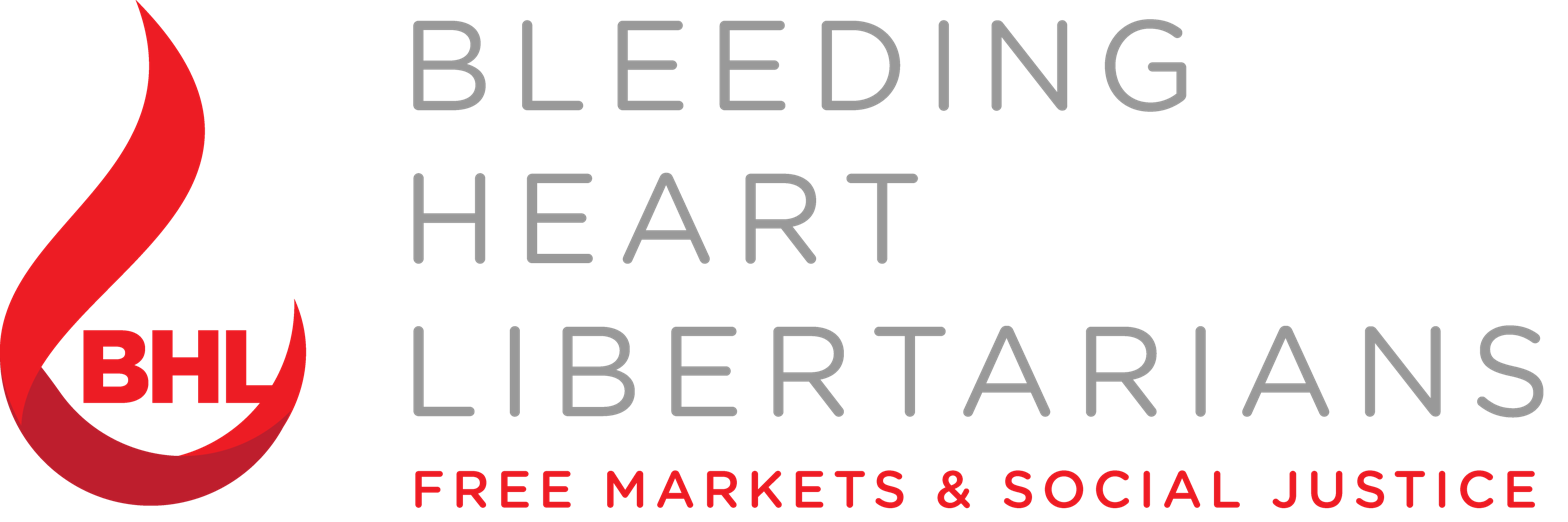
Logo used by the official Bleeding-Heart Libertarians blog.

Neoclassical liberalism, as understood by the "Arizona School liberalism" or "bleeding-heart libertarians", is a libertarian political philosophy that focuses on the compatibility of support for civil liberties and free markets on the one hand and a concern for social justice and the well-being of the worst-off on the other. Adherents of neoclassical liberalism broadly hold that an agenda focused upon individual liberty will be of most benefit to the economically weak and socially disadvantaged.

The first known use of the term "Arizona School" was by Andrew Sabl, introducing David Schmidtz at a UCLA Department Colloquium in 2012. Upon being pressed to define "Arizona School" Sabl said the school is broadly libertarian but that its most distinguishing characteristic is that it produces political philosophy that aims to be observation-based and empirically accountable. The first recorded use of the term bleeding-heart libertarian seems to have been in a 1996 essay by Roderick T. Long. It was subsequently used in a blog post by Stefan Sharkansky and later picked up and elaborated on by Arnold Kling in an article for TCS Daily. Since then, the term has been used sporadically by a number of libertarian writers including Anthony Gregory and Bryan Caplan.

In March 2011, a group of academic philosophers, political theorists and economists created the Bleeding Heart Libertarians blog. Regular contributors to the blog included Fernando Tesón, Gary Chartier, Jason Brennan, Matt Zwolinski, Roderick T. Long, and Steven Horwitz.

Economist David D. Friedman has been critical of the movement, stating that bleeding-heart libertarians "...insist that social justice ought to be part of libertarianism but are unwilling to tell us what it means."

On 1 June 2020, co-founder Matt Zwolinski announced in a post titled "The End" that the Bleeding Heart Libertarians website would cease publishing new material. Zwolinski wrote that the blog’s "initial mission of publicizing the connection between free markets and social justice has been largely accomplished," adding that the archive would remain online so researchers and readers could continue to consult past entries, but that no further posts would appear. Reason magazine reported that "one of the most influential libertarian blogs on the internet has come to an end," while noting that most of the site’s contributors planned to keep writing for other outlets.

Zwolinski later argued that, contrary to the blog’s early hopes, discourse around the nexus of free markets and social justice had actually regressed, as alt-right rhetoric increasingly crowded out libertarian perspectives. Describing this trend as a "deterioration," he relaunched the project in 2023 on the Substack platform as a solo newsletter under the same banner, The Bleeding Heart Libertarian.

== See also ==
- Classical liberalism
- Gary Chartier
- Compassionate conservatism
- Distributive justice
- Fred Foldvary
- Free Market Fairness
- Geolibertarianism
- Left-libertarianism
- Libertarian paternalism
- Lockean proviso
- Market anarchism
- Michael Munger
- Neo-libertarianism
- Ordoliberalism
- Michael Otsuka
- Poverty reduction
- Radical centrism
- Radicalism (historical)
- David Schmidtz
- Hillel Steiner
