= Gary Chartier =

American theologian, philosopher, legal scholar, and political theorist (born 1966)

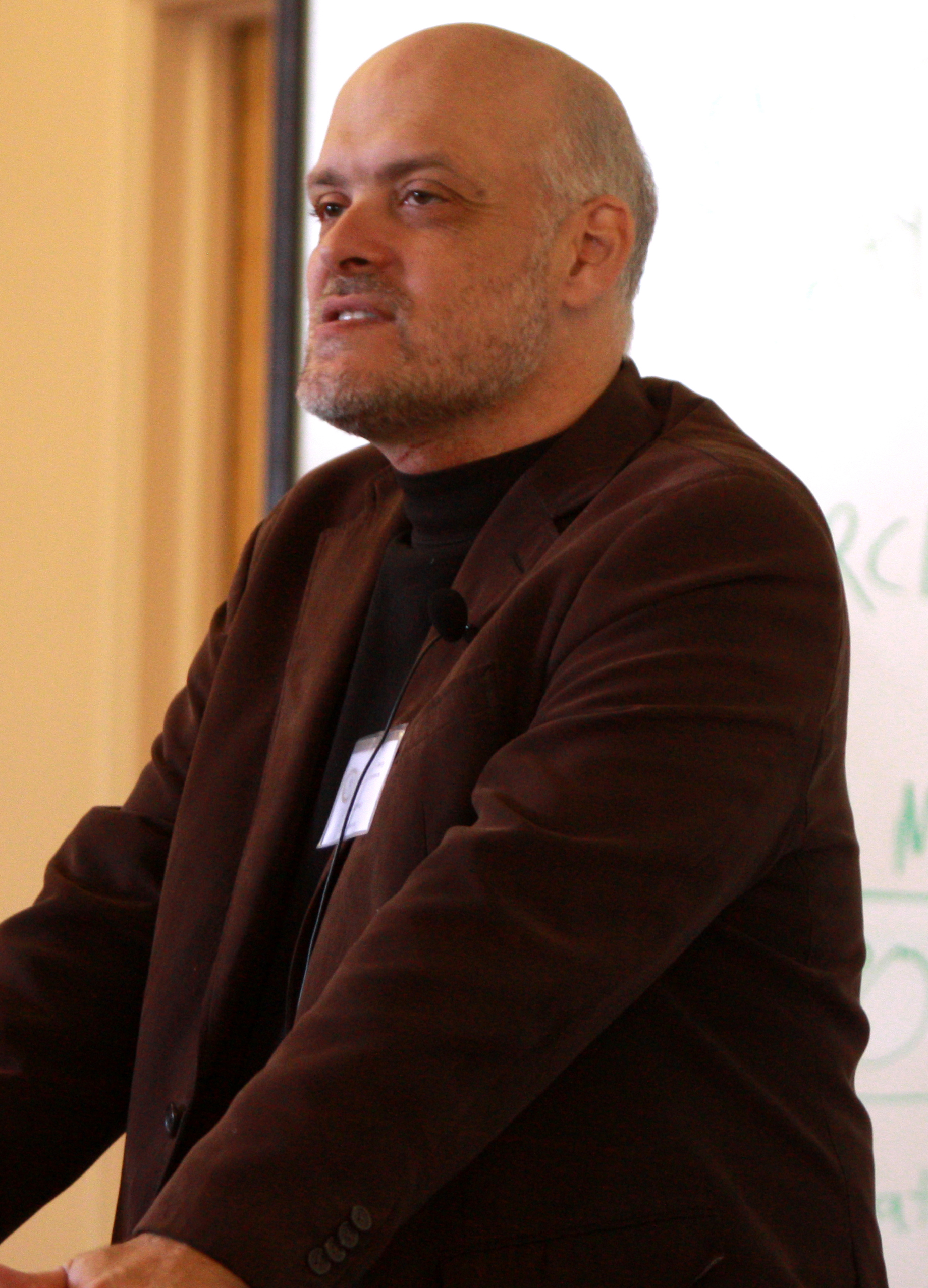
- Born: Gary William Chartier; 1966 (age 59–60); Glendale, California, U.S.

Education
- Education: La Sierra University (BA); University of Cambridge (PhD, LLD); University of California, Los Angeles (JD)

Philosophical work
- Era: Contemporary philosophy
- Region: Western philosophy
- School: Analytic philosophy, natural law, process philosophy, bleeding-heart libertarianism
- Institutions: La Sierra University, University of Cambridge
- Main interests: Anarchism, left-libertarianism, meta-ethics, applied ethics, political philosophy, philosophy of religion, philosophical theology
- Notable works: Anarchy and Legal Order (2013)

Gary William Chartier (born 1966) is an American legal scholar, philosopher, political theorist, and theologian. His work addresses anarchism and ethics. Chartier is a professor and serves as associate dean of La Sierra University's business school.

== Early life ==
Chartier was born in 1966, in Glendale, California, and raised in a conservative Protestant (Seventh-day Adventist) home. His father was an accountant and physician. In high school, Chartier became interested in economic libertarian authors, following his father's ideological lean. He received his bachelor's degree from La Sierra University in 1987 and his Ph.D. from the University of Cambridge in 1991.

== Academic career ==
After working as the editor of a newspaper in Temecula, California, Chartier enrolled at the UCLA School of Law, graduating with a J.D. in 2001. During his legal studies, he served as a lecturer in business ethics at La Sierra and began a full-time academic appointment there in September 2001. In 2015, the University of Cambridge presented Chartier with an earned higher doctorate, an LLD, in recognition of his work in legal theory. He is currently Associate Dean and Distinguished Professor of Law and Business Ethics at La Sierra's Zapara School of Business.

== Philosophy ==
Chartier advocates for a variant of natural law thinking, which he has employed in discussions of anarchism, economic life, and the moral status and claims of non-human animals. Other topics he has discussed include sexuality and lying.

Kevin Carson's work, in particular, provided a model for Chartier's reconciliation of his leftist politics with opposition to the state, and helped him to combine left-libertarian market anarchism with insights from natural law theory.

== Reception ==
Reviewing Anarchy and Legal Order in Common Knowledge, Peter Leeson described it as "intriguing" and classed it "among the most sophisticated ethical defenses of anarchy I have encountered." In Anarchist Studies, Eric Roark wrote: "Gary Chartier's Anarchy and Legal Order offers nothing less than a tremendous contribution to contemporary libertarian and anarchist thought." Roark highlighted what he characterized as a "compelling and rich vision of anarchy forged by a just legal regime." Edward Stringham characterized the book as "well written, thought provoking, and a welcome addition to the literature."

Aeon Skoble of Bridgewater State University suggested in a Reason review that Chartier's "arguments [in the book] are laid out with such elegance and precision that any intelligent lay reader should be able to understand them." Skoble writes: "Anarchy and Legal Order is an impressive contribution to libertarian thought generally, and in particular to the ongoing debates on anarchism versus minarchism and on libertarianism's place vis-a-vis the left/right dichotomy. It's a must-read for those interested in political philosophy, and it may well challenge readers' long-held beliefs about the nature of government." In a symposium in Studies in Emergent Order devoted to the book, Skoble added: "Chartier's argument demonstrates not only that natural law theory is compatible with spontaneous order theory, but also that what this confluence points to is a voluntary, polycentric legal order. The book is thus valuable not only for offering a robust defense of polycentrism, but for doing so in a way that ties together two important threads from the liberal tradition, natural law and spontaneous order, and in doing so, enhances our understanding of both." Also writing in the symposium, Jason Brennan criticized Chartier's reliance on the controversial new natural law theory and objected to his embrace of the theory's view that basic aspects of well-being are incommensurable, a view Brennan suggested led to counterintuitive, implausible conclusions. While expressing some concerns about the feasibility of Chartier's proposals, Paul Dragos Aligica concluded: "Anarchy and Legal Order is currently the book to read if one wants to explore the potential and limits of natural law, non-aggression maxim, praxeology based doctrines of stateless social order. Austrian scholars of all persuasions will benefit immensely from engaging with its arguments and the intellectual precedent it creates."

St. John's University economist Charles Clarke criticized Economic Justice and Natural Law's anarchism, evaluating it as insufficiently attentive to the need for governmental involvement in the economy and as unduly similar in tone to the work of Austrian economists. The book was the focus of a Molinari Society session at the April 2011 San Diego convention of the American Philosophical Association's Pacific Division.

The Analogy of Love received mixed reviews. In the course of a tepidly favorable assessment, Timothy Gorringe maintained that some passages disposed him to "reach for the whiskey bottle," though he also observed that the book did "not parade its erudition" and suggested that it was "consistently on the side of the angels." Paul Ballard described Analogy as "extremely well informed and researched," as "comprehensive," and as "rich, sensitive and insightful." Ballard evaluated the book's "style of presentation" as "remarkably lucid and jargon free" and as "spare, simple, direct and logical, cutting to the heart of a discussion." Mike Higton of the University of Durham observes that "Chartier draws on impressively wide reading in the modern secondary literature . . . ." While unconvinced by Chartier's depiction of God as a moral agent, and evidently doubtful about his greater reliance on contemporary than on biblical or classical sources, Higton suggests that "his insistence on coming back again and again to love is salutary, and the book as a whole issues a thought-provoking challenge to take love seriously in every domain of theology."

== Selected publications ==
=== Authored books ===
- The Analogy of Love: Divine and Human Love at the Center of Christian Theology. Exeter: Imprint Academic (2007) ISBN 978-1845400910. OCLC 173182241. ISSN 0040-571X. 2d. ed. Ann Arbor, MI: Griffin 2017. ISBN 978-0692833223
- Economic Justice and Natural Law. Cambridge: CUP (2009) ISBN 978-0521767200 OCLC 318871444
- The Conscience of an Anarchist. Apple Valley, CA: Cobden (2011) ISBN 978-1439266991. OCLC 760097242
- Anarchy and Legal Order: Law and Politics for a Stateless Society. New York: CUP (2013) ISBN 978-1107032286. OCLC 795645156
- Radicalizing Rawls: Global Justice and the Foundations of International Law. Philosophy, Public Policy, and Transnational Law 2. New York: Palgrave (2014) ISBN 978-1137382900
- Vulnerability and Community: Meditations on the Spiritual Life. Ann Arbor, MI: Griffin (2015) ISBN 978-0692494127
- Public Practice, Private Law: An Essay on Love, Marriage, and the State. New York: CUP (2016) ISBN 978-1107140608
- The Logic of Commitment. New York: Routledge (2018) ISBN 978-1138301481
- An Ecological Theory of Free Expression. New York: Palgrave (2018)ISBN 978-3319752709
- A Good Life in the Market: An Introduction to Business Ethics. Great Barrington, MA: American Institute for Economic Research (2019) ISBN 978-1630691691
- Flourishing Lives: Exploring Natural Law Liberalism. New York: CUP (2019) ISBN 978-1108493048
- The Idea of an Adventist University. New York: Griffin (2020) ISBN 978-0578741826
- Understanding Friendship: On the Moral, Political, and Spiritual Meaning of Love. Minneapolis: Fortress (2022) ISBN 978-1506479088
- Loving Creation: The Task of the Moral Life. Minneapolis: Fortress (2022) ISBN 978-1506481043

=== Edited books ===
- Chartier, Gary, and Johnson, Charles W., eds. Markets Not Capitalism: Individualist Anarchism against Bosses, Inequality, Corporate Power, and Structural Poverty. New York: Minor Compositions-Autonomedia (2011)ISBN 978-1570272424. OCLC 757148527
- The Future of Adventism: Theology, Society, Experience. Ann Arbor, MI: Griffin (2015) ISBN 978-0692520215
- Hart, David M., Chartier, Gary, Kenyon, Ross Miller, and Long, Roderick T., eds. Social Class and State Power: Exploring an Alternative Radical Tradition. New York: Palgrave (2018) ISBN 978-3319648934
- Chartier, Gary, and Van Schoelandt, Chad, eds. The Routledge Handbook of Anarchy and Anarchist Thought. New York: Routledge (2020) ISBN 978-1138737587
