= Raisons Politiques =

French periodical

Raisons Politiques is a journal of political theory published by the French social organization Presses de Sciences Po, which is a university-based publishing house specializing in the social sciences and serving under the umbrella of the Sciences Po (also known as the Paris Institute of Political Studies). The journal has distributed contents in both the English and French languages.

Particular areas that the journal focuses on include analytical philosophy and the general history of ideas. Scholars who have had their works published in Raisons Politiques' include Arto Charpentier, Billy Christmas, Lucile Richard, and Hillel Steiner among others.
