= Radical right (Europe) =

Right-wing groups in Europe since 1970

In political science, the terms radical right, populist right, and populist radical right have been used to refer to the range of nationalist, right-wing, and far-right political parties that have grown in support in Europe since the late 1970s. Populist right groups have shared a number of causes, which typically include opposition to globalisation and immigration, criticism of multiculturalism, and opposition to the European Union, with some opposing liberal democracy or rejecting democracy altogether in favor of "illiberal democracy" or outright authoritarian dictatorship.

The ideological spectrum of the radical right extends from staunchly national conservatism and right-wing populism, to far-right Third Positionism and other neo-fascist ideologies.

== Terminology ==
Since the 2020s, scholars have described the radical right as belonging to a subset of far-right politics, distinguished from the extreme right. The Friedrich Ebert Foundation, in a 2011 book, categorised radical right as being either "right-wing extremist" or "right-wing populist".

=== Origins ===
In the late 20th century, within the context of European politics, the term 'extreme right' was frequently used as a synonym for fascism, neo-fascism or neo-Nazism. In the 1990s, with the growth of populist anti-immigration parties which distanced themselves from their extremely pro-immigration counterparts, the number of scholars who attempted to distinguish the extreme right from the radical right greatly increased. This trend included the use of populism as another descriptive term, either as the populist radical right or radical-right populism.

In 1996, the Dutch political scientist Cas Mudde noted that in most European countries, the terms "radical right" and "extreme right" were used interchangeably. He cited Germany as an exception, noting that among political scientists in that nation, the term "radical right" (Rechsradikalismus) was used in reference to those right-wing groups which were outside the political mainstream but which did not threaten "the free democratic order"; the term was thus used in contrast to the "extreme right" (Rechsextremen), which referred to groups which did threaten the constitutionality of the state and could therefore be banned under German law. According to the German scientist Klaus Wahl "the radical right can be scaled by using different degrees of militancy and aggressiveness from right-wing populism to racism, terrorism, and totalitarianism".

The term "radical right" originated in U.S. political discourse, where it was applied to various anti-communist groups which were active in the 1950s, during the era of McCarthyism. The term and accompanying concept then entered Western Europe through the social sciences. Conversely, the term "right-wing extremism" developed among European scholars, particularly those in Germany, to describe right-wing groups that developed in the decades following the Second World War, such as the West German National Democratic Party and the French Poujadists. This term then came to be adopted by some scholars in the U.S.

=== Europe's populist right ===
"The rise of new parties on the right in the 1980s led to a great deal of controversy over how these parties are defined. Some authors argue that these parties share essential characteristics, while others point to the unique national features and circumstances of each party. Some see them as throwbacks to the fascist era, while others see them as mixing right-wing, liberal, and populist platforms to broaden their electoral appeal. The party ideologues themselves have argued that they cannot be placed on the left-to-right spectrum."

— Terri E. Givens, 2005.

In his study of the movement in Europe, David Art defined the term "radical right" as referring to "a specific type of far right party that began to emerge in the late 1970s"; as Art used it, "far right" was "an umbrella term for any political party, voluntary association, or extra-parliamentary movement that differentiates itself from the mainstream right". Most commentators have agreed that these varied radical right parties have a number of common characteristics. Givens stated that the two characteristics shared by these radical rights groups were:

- "They take an anti-immigrant stance by proposing stronger immigrant controls and the repatriation of unemployed immigrants, and they call for a national (i.e., citizens only) preference in social benefits and employment ('welfare chauvinism').
- "In contrast to earlier extreme right or fascist parties, they work within a country's political and electoral system. Although they do not have the goal of tearing down the current political system, they are anti-establishment. They consider themselves "outsiders" in the party system, and therefore not tainted by government or mainstream parties' scandals."

In 2000, Minkenberg characterised the "radical right" as "a political ideology, the core element of which is a myth of a homogeneous nation, a romantic and populist ultranationalism which is directed against the concept of liberal and pluralistic democracy and its underlying principles of individualism and universalism. The contemporary radical right does not want to return to pre-democratic regimes such as monarchy or feudalism. It wants government by the people, but in terms of ethnocracy instead of democracy." In 2020, Wahl summarized that "ideologies of the radical right emphasize social and economic threats in the modern and postmodern world (e.g., globalization, immigration). The radical right also promises protection against such threats by an emphatic ethnic construction of 'we', the people, as a familiar, homogeneous in-group, anti-modern, or reactionary structures of family, society, an authoritarian state, nationalism, the discrimination, or exclusion of immigrants and other minorities ... While favoring traditional social and cultural structures (traditional family and gender roles, religion, etc.) the radical right uses modern technologies and does not ascribe to a specific economic policy; some parties tend toward a liberal, free-market policy, and others more to a welfare state policy."

Journalist Nick Robins-Early characterised the European radical right as focusing on "sometimes vitriolic anti-Euro, anti-immigrant sentiment, as well as renewed security fears" within European nations. According to political scientist Andrej Zaslove, populist radical right parties "employ an anti‐state, anti‐bureaucratic, anti‐elite, anti‐European Union political message."

=== Base of support ===
The 2005 paper in the European Journal of Political Research argues that the two groups most likely to vote for populist right parties are "blue-collar workers – who support extensive state intervention in the economy – and owners of small businesses – who are against such state intervention".

A 2014 article by the Friedrich Ebert Foundation argued that economic inequality is growing the gap "between the winners of globalisation and its losers. The first group live in urban areas, have relatively stable jobs and access to modern communications and transport, but fears nevertheless that it will soon share the fate of the second group. The second group, meanwhile, are threatened by unemployment or stuck in poorly paid and precarious jobs. They belong to the working class or consider themselves part of the lower middle class and fear – for themselves or their children – (further) social decline. Such people live in de-industrialised areas, or rural or semi-urban areas, on the periphery of globalised metropolises to which they have no access."

Scholars have argued that neoliberalism has led to European "social and economic insecurity" in the working and middle classes, leading to the growth of right wing populism.

Minkenberg termed the supporters of the radical right "modernization losers", in that they are from the sectors of society whose "social and cultural capital is shrinking and they are intent on defending it against encroachments on their traditional entitlements." He described this base as those who exhibit "unease, rigid thinking, authoritarian attitudes and traditional values – all of which reinforce each other."

== Association by country ==
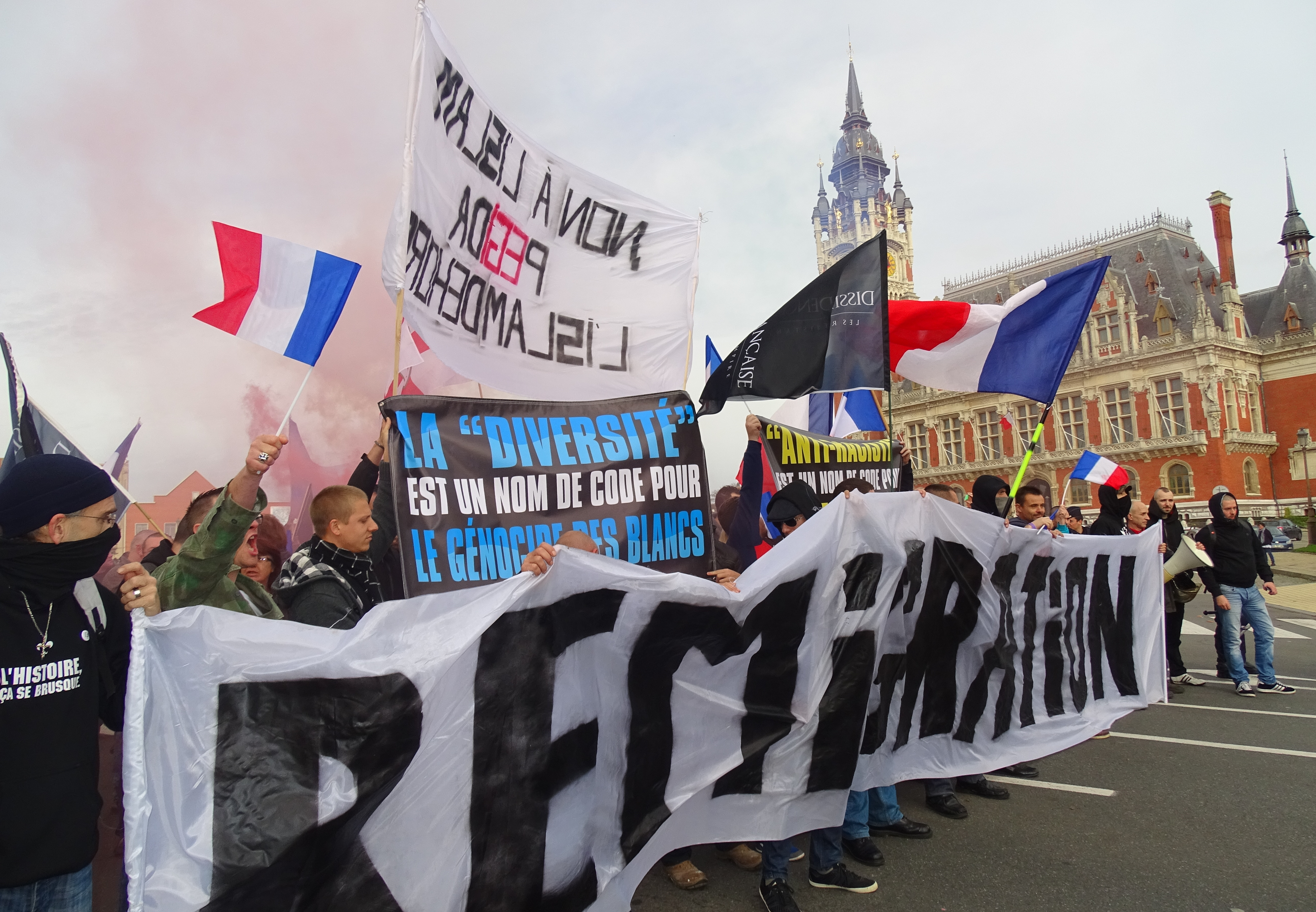
French radical right protesters in Calais hold banners saying "Remigration" and "Diversity is a code word for white genocide", 8 November 2015.

Political scientist Michael Minkenberg stressed that the radical right was "a modern phenomenon", stating that it is only "vaguely connected" to previous right-wing movements because it has "undergone a phase of renewal, as a result of social and cultural modernisation shifts in post-war Europe." As such he opined that describing it using terms such as "fascism" or "neo-fascism", which were closely linked the right-wing movements of the early 20th century, was an "increasingly obsolete" approach.

Minkenberg argued that the radical right groups in Eastern Europe, including in Eastern Germany, were distinct from their counterparts in Western Europe. He added that "the East European radical right is more reverse-oriented than its Western counterpart, i.e. more antidemocratic and more militant" and that because of the relatively new establishment of liberal democracy in Eastern Europe, violence still could be used as a political tool by the Eastern radical right.

Jeffrey Kaplan and Leonard Weinberg's 1998 book The Emergence of a Euro-American Radical Right says that populist right wing movements are supported by extra-parliamentary groups with electorally unpalatable views, such as Christian Identity movements, anti-Semitic conspiracy theories, the promotion of scientific racism and Holocaust denial, and neo-Nazi economic theories like Strasserism.

=== United States ===
"[There is a] growing similarity of economic and social conditions in Western Europe and the United States. The effect of this concurrence, the appearance of a multicultural and multiracial Western Europe and its consequent resemblance to the United States in particular, has promoted racial resentments. Some whites, defined as Aryans, Teutons, and so on, have become so alienated from their respective national societies they have become sympathetic to the formation of a racial folk community that is Euro-American in scope and indeed reaches out to include 'kinsmen' in South Africa, Australia and New Zealand as well."

— Jeffrey Kaplan and Leonard Weinberg, 1998.

In 1998, the political scientists Jeffrey Kaplan and Leonard Weinberg argued that the interaction of right-wingers and the transmission of ideas between right-wing groups in Western Europe and the United States was common, having been aided by the development of the internet. They believed that in the late 20th century, a discernible "Euro-American radical right" that would promote a trans-national form of white identity politics, promoting populist grievance narratives around groups which feel besieged by non-white peoples through multiculturalism. This concept of a unified "white" race was not always explicitly racialist, in many cases, it was conceived of as a bond which was created by "cultural affinity and a sense of common historical experience and a shared ultimate destiny".

Kaplan and Weinberg also identified differences in the radical right movements of Europe and North America. They noted that European radical right political parties had been able to achieve electoral successes in a way that their American counterparts had failed to do. Instead, radical right activists in the U.S. had attempted to circumvent the restrictions of the two-party system by joining right-wing trends within the Republican Party. They also noted that legal restrictions on such groups differed in the two continents; in the U.S., the First Amendment protected the free speech of radical right groups, while in most West European nations there were laws prohibiting hate speech and (in several countries) Holocaust denial, thus forcing European radical right groups to present a more moderate image.

The election of President Donald Trump in the United States has drawn praise from the European radical right, and following his election, connections were expanded, with Trump's National Security Advisor Michael Flynn meeting with the Freedom Party of Austria, and former White House chief strategist Steve Bannon founding The Movement, a network intended to advance European radical right causes. However, despite the European radical right's increasing cross-border cooperation in recent years, Bannon's pan-European networking project ultimately failed to materialize. Trump also initially made supportive remarks towards Marine Le Pen's candidacy in the 2017 French presidential election. In February 2025, U.S. Vice President JD Vance gave a speech at the Munich Security Conference condemning the annulment of the 2024 Romanian presidential election after radical right candidate Călin Georgescu won a plurality of the votes, and criticising the German Christian Democratic Union for its cordon sanitaire against the Alternative for Germany party. In April 2025, President Trump spoke out against a court decision banning Marine Le Pen from contesting the 2027 French presidential election. In May 2025, Vance and U.S. Secretary of State Marco Rubio condemned the German Federal Intelligence Service's designation of the Alternative for Germany as extremist, with Republican Senator Tom Cotton calling for limiting intelligence sharing with Germany. Trump's State Department offered public support to Le Pen in May 2025, but the offer was rebuffed by her National Rally party. The State Department also considered a proposal to provide financial assistance to the National Rally.

=== United Kingdom ===
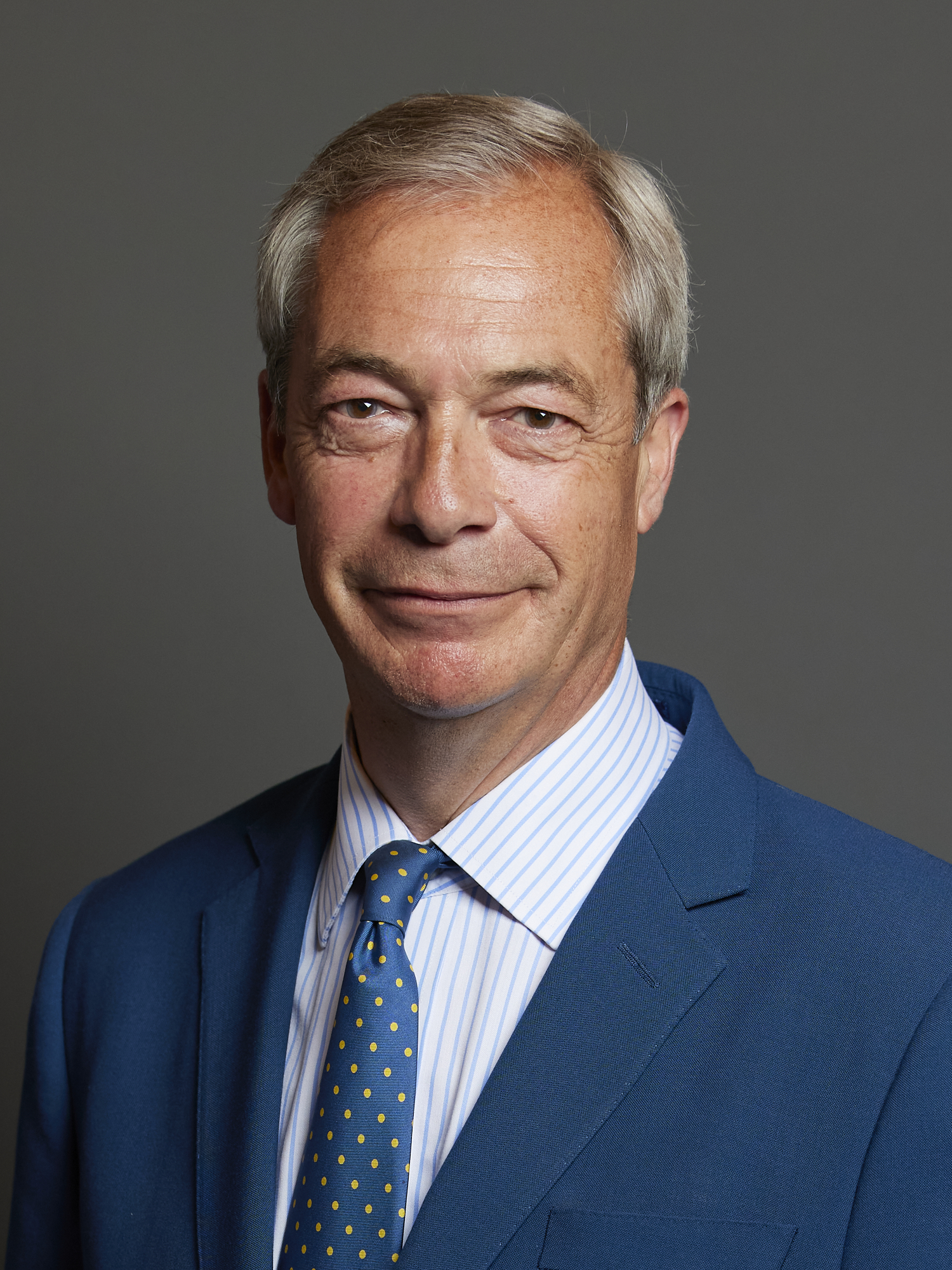
Reform UK leader Nigel Farage, described by Tim Bale as the "British representative of the populist radical right in Europe"

The UK Independence Party (UKIP) and Reform UK (formerly the Brexit Party) have been labelled as radical right by political scientists, while the categorisation of the British National Party (BNP) remains disputed. In West European Politics, Martin, Scott & Kappe based the classification of the three parties on their "traditional, authoritarian, and nationalist" characteristics. The political scientists Robert Ford and Matthew Goodwin have also characterised UKIP as being on the radical right. Historically, such parties have been minor political parties in UK elections. UKIP first won seats to the EU Parliament in 1999 but won only one seat to the UK Parliament over five elections; the Brexit Party won 29 seats in the 2019 EU election, but the party failed to gain any seats in the 2019 UK election.

In the Australian Journal of Politics and History, LeCras argued that prior to 2016 the emergence of the radical right in the UK can be ideologically traced back to the rise of UKIP after the EU referendum, originating from the "radical traditions of English conservatism", as opposed to the fascist origins of the extreme right. Additionally, that "the ideological interests of conservative populists and right‐wing extremists in the United Kingdom have frequently intersected — and that this blurring of the boundaries is likely to continue in future manifestations of the country's populist radical right". LeCras further wrote that prior to Brexit there was "some uncertainty among political scientists as to what British parties could be included within the populist radical right‐wing family", with Cas Mudde in 2016 predicting that UKIP would "gravitate further to the radical right" after the result of the EU referendum. In 2020, LeCras asserted that UKIP had been "broadly accepted as the exemplar of radical right‐wing populism in Britain", whereas the BNP remains contested – or "borderline" according to Mudde – based on "its historical connection with neo‐fascism and the extreme right". According to the Centre for Research and Evidence on Security Threats, with the BNP serving as an example, there are concerns that "distinguishing between radical and extreme groups serves to gloss over the extreme roots of many of the groups now considered radical, potentially legitimising them."

After winning 14% of the vote and winning five seats in the 2024 UK general election, political scientist Tim Bale described Reform UK party leader Farage as the "British representative of the populist radical right in Europe", as one of the moderate far-right parties in Europe. In Parliamentary Affairs, Bennie & Widfeldt described the party as fitting "into a broader European family of radical right parties working within democratic structures", with radical right as a subset of far-right politics.

In 2025, Hayton wrote in British Politics that with the Conservative Party becoming increasing populist, Reform UK had evolved into a "fully-fledged right-wing populist party" and can most logically be categorised as "populist radical right", having moved beyond the single-issue politics of Brexit while retaining a Eurosceptic legacy. In the French Journal of British Studies, Professor Tournier-Sol described Farage as a major disruptor of British politics and as "moving the tectonic plates of British politics towards the right," resulting in the Conservative Party becoming a radical right party. The professor further wrote of Reform UK adhering to the political positions of Farage's previous parties, that of being populist radical right. In the Policy Studies Journal, Kippin credited Reform UK with their ability to shape media and public opinion to influence the Conservative Party's approach to policy, and considered the relationship between the two parties as "authoritarian mainstreaming", with the Conservatives being "outflanked by a Farage style radical right insurgency".

A new radical right party, Restore Britain, has emerged in British politics after the expulsion of Great Yarmouth MP Rupert Lowe from Reform UK in March 2025. Initially established as a pressure group on 30 July 2025, Restore was registered as a political party on 20 March 2026, with Lowe becoming its first (and, as of June 2026, only) MP. Also, in December 2025, Lowe founded Great Yarmouth First (GYF) as the local affiliate of Restore in his Norfolk constituency, following Restore's outward presentation as an umbrella organisation for local parties; GYF went on to win all ten seats it contested in the local elections that year. Both Restore and GYF have been described as far-right, and to the right of Reform UK, posing an electoral challenge to Nigel Farage as they seek to push further right and win over Reform's more ethnonationalist voters with its hardline anti-immigrant, radical right politics. Restore has won the support of Duncan Bannatyne, Elon Musk, and English "neo-fascist leaders" Simon Birkett and Steve Laws, along with between 4% and 10% of the public according to opinion polling.

=== Russia ===
Some radical right parties, such as the French National Rally, the Alternative for Germany, the Dutch Forum for Democracy, the Freedom Party of Austria, the Italian Northern League, the Bulgarian Attack and the Hungarian Jobbik have cultivated relations with the Russian government. The Freedom Party of Austria and Northern League have signed cooperation agreements with the ruling party of Russia, United Russia. Russia has also been accused of providing assistance to several radical right parties in Europe.

=== India ===
In 2019, several radical right parties participated in the only permitted international delegation in Kashmir following the revocation of the special status of Jammu and Kashmir, on the invitation of India's Bharatiya Janata Party (BJP) government. The parties that participated included the National Rally, the Northern League, the Alternative for Germany, the Spanish Vox, the British Brexit Party, the Polish Law and Justice and the Belgian Vlaams Belang. This was described in Foreign Policy as evidence of growing connections between the radical right in Europe and Right wing supporters in India. The Fidesz government in Hungary has also expressed support for India on Kashmir and the Citizenship Amendment Act protests. The BJP previously established a relationship with the Jobbik party in Hungary. In February 2025, representatives of the Patriots for Europe group visited India to meet BJP officials, which was followed by the Patriots for Europe hosting an address by BJP spokesperson Shazia Ilmi in June 2025.

=== Israel ===
Many radical right parties, including Vlaams Belang, Attack, the Freedom Party of Austria, the Alliance for the Union of Romanians and the Sweden Democrats, have sought improved ties with Israel and its ruling party, Likud, in an effort to counter accusations of anti-Semitism domestically. Israeli Prime Minister Benjamin Netanyahu has cultivated these relationships, particularly with the Northern League and Hungary under Fidesz, to build international support for Israeli policies. Likud's foreign affairs director endorsed a vote for Vox in the April 2019 Spanish general election on behalf of his party, before backtracking and stating it was only a personal endorsement. Netanyahu's son, Yair Netanyahu, later wished luck to Fidesz leader Viktor Orban, Brexit Party leader Nigel Farage, Northern League leader Matteo Salvini and Dutch Party for Freedom leader Geert Wilders in the 2019 European Parliament election.

In 2023, Likud participated in an Identity and Democracy Party conference hosted by Salvini in Rome. In 2024, Likud minister Amichai Chikli addressed a Vox rally, where he met with National Rally leader Marine Le Pen. Chikli later expressed support for Le Pen becoming President of France, and suggested his view was shared by Netanyahu; Chikli also noted his "excellent contact" with the National Rally.

Likud also have links with the Portuguese Chega, the Danish People's Party, and the Alliance for the Union of Romanians

=== Other countries ===
Arab states including Egypt, Syria, the United Arab Emirates and Saudi Arabia have been described as courting ties with the European radical right in recent years, based on shared concerns towards the rise of Islamism. In the past, radical right parties had also developed relationships with Ba'athist Iraq, the Libyan Arab Jamahiriya and the government of Morocco. In 2011, politicians from the Freedom Party of Austria were involved in arranging clandestine peace talks between Libya's Saif al-Islam Gaddafi and Israel's Ayoob Kara.

The Justice and Development Party and Nationalist Movement Party, which together form the ruling government coalition in Turkey, have developed ties with Jobbik, inviting leading Jobbik members to their events. However, most radical right parties in Europe, such as the Northern League, National Rally and Greek Solution, hold strongly anti-Turkish views. The leader of the predecessor of the National Rally, the National Front, Jean-Marie Le Pen, had a friendship with Welfare Party leader Necmettin Erbakan, based on their shared right-wing nationalism and their belief that it was impossible to combine Islamic and Christian civilization.

The former dictator of the Central African Republic, Jean-Bédel Bokassa, received extensive support from the National Front, and let the party use his castle in France as a training facility.

During the presidency of Jair Bolsonaro in Brazil, the Brazilian government developed close ties with radical right parties in Hungary, Italy and Poland. In addition, Bolsonaro has developed relations with Vox and with the Portuguese Chega.

== Extra-parliamentary right-wing groups ==
Alongside the radical right political parties, there are also extra-parliamentary groups which – having no need to express views that will be electorally palatable – are able to express a more heterogenous array of right-wing views. These extra-parliamentary rightist groups are often religious in nature, affiliated either with Christian Identity or with Odinism, reflecting a greater racial mysticism than was present in earlier right-wing movements. Such groups often believe that Western governments are under the control of a Zionist Occupation Government (ZOG), thus expressing explicitly anti-Semitic views. Such groups are also less enthusiastic about capitalism and free markets as the radical right political parties are, instead being influenced by Strasserism and favouring greater state control of the economy. Such extra-parliamentary groups often exhibit ritual or ceremonial practices to commemorate perceived past achievements of the right-wing, for instance by marking Adolf Hitler's birthday or the death date of Rudolf Hess. They are also associated with violent activities, with such violence often being used not just for political aims but also as an expressive and enjoyable activity.

There are also more intellectually-oriented radical right organisations which hold conferences and publish journals devoted to the promotion of scientific racism and Holocaust denial. Material promoting Holocaust denial is typically published in the United Kingdom or United States and then smuggled into continental Europe, where the publication of such material is widely illegal.

== Examples ==
A 2015 study on modern populism by Kirk A. Hawkins of Brigham Young University used human coding to rate the level of perceived populist rhetoric in party manifestos and political speeches. Parties with high populism scores included Chega, the British National Party, the Swiss People's Party, the National Democratic Party of Germany, the Alliance for the Union of Romanians the National Rally, the People's Party, National Democracy, Sweden Democrats, the Party for Freedom, Forum for Democracy, Law and Justice, Vox and United Poland parties.

Since the 2010s, multiple radical right parties have formed part of governments in Europe. This has included Fidesz in Hungary (2010–2026), Law and Justice in Poland (2015–2023), the Finns Party in Finland, Lega and Brothers of Italy in Italy, the Party for Freedom in the Netherlands, the Slovak National Party in Slovakia, the Slovenian Democratic Party in Slovenia, the Homeland Movement in Croatia, and the Freedom Party of Austria in Austria (2017–2019).

== See also ==
- Antisemitism by country#Europe
  - Antisemitism in Europe
- Alliance for Peace and Freedom
- Alternative for Germany
  - Der Flügel
- Alt-right
- Britain First
- British National Party
- Congress of the New Right
- Conservative People's Party of Estonia
- Crypto-fascism
- Europe of Nations and Freedom
- European New Right
- Falange Española de las JONS
- Far-right politics
  - Far-right subcultures
- Fascism in Europe
- Fidesz, Hungary
- Golden Dawn
- Lega Nord
- List of active nationalist parties in Europe
- Movement for a Europe of Nations and Freedom
- National Rally
- Nativism (politics)
- Neo-nationalism
- Our Homeland Movement, Hungary
- Para-fascism
- Party for Freedom
- Party of the Swedes
- Post-fascism
- Pro Germany Citizens' Movement
- Proto-fascism
- Reform UK
- Right-wing politics
  - Right-wing populism
    - Right-wing terrorism
- The Radical Right in Western Europe
- UK Independence Party
- Ultraconservatism
- Vlaams Belang
- White backlash
- White nationalism
- White supremacy
- Xenophobia
