= Free Market Fairness =

- First edition
- Authors: John Tomasi
- Language: English
- Publisher: Princeton University Press
- Publication date: 2012

Free Market Fairness is a 2012 book of political philosophy written by John Tomasi, president of the Heterodox Academy and former Professor of Political Philosophy at Brown University. Tomasi presents the concept of "free market fairness" or "market democracy," a middle ground between Friedrich Hayek and John Rawls's ideas. The book was widely reviewed.

== Content ==
Tomasi looks at followers of Friedrich Hayek on the right and John Rawls on the left, only to conclude that both views are not mutually exclusive. Taken together, they can lead to "free market fairness" or "market democracy", whereby the government is not prescriptive, but makes sure opportunities are available to all.

Tomasi's fusionist-inspired project combines a foundational commitment to social justice with a foundational commitment to private economic liberty. Tomasi calls this hybrid "market democracy" and he holds it up as a moral rival to familiar conceptions of social democratic justice. "Free Market Fairness" is a leading text of the movement known as "Bleeding Heart Libertarianism," which seeks to combine a commitment to economic liberty with a commitment to social justice.

In 2018, Tomasi traveled to Santiago, Chile to meet with Chilean President Sebastián Pinera for a public discussion on the application of Tomasi's model of market democracy at the policy level.

== Critical reception ==
Writing for The Wall Street Journal, Adam Wolfson suggested, "Mr. Tomasi's book is emphatically a work of political theory, not a blueprint for political action, much less a catalog of policy solutions."

In the peer-reviewed academic journal "Political Theory," Elizabeth Anderson describes "Free Market Fairness" as launching "a major research program - Market Democracy." Anderson writes, "market democracy offers a refreshing change from stale debates within libertarian and high liberal ideal theory. Tomasi is right to stress that the economy is an important domain of liberty wrongly denigrated by high liberals, as distributive justice has been wrongly denigrated by libertarians." In a review in the European journal "Res Publica," Alan Thomas calls Free Market Fairness "a landmark publication in political philosophy." Thomas writes "It deserves many readers for its clarity, intelligence, openness to the ideas of others and yet insistence that the classically liberal tradition deserves to be represented alongside the standard options in recent political philosophy." In The Financial Times, Samuel Brittan criticized this, adding, "Unfortunately the book does not live up to its splendid introduction." He concluded, "Tomasi describes free-market fairness as a research programme rather than a fixed dogma. There is clearly a lot more to research."

In Notre Dame Philosophical Reviews, Andrew Koppelman, a Professor of Law at Northwestern University, suggested, "Tomasi's book is a useful corrective to both Rawls and Hayek." However, he argued that Tomasi's ideas were at times unrealistic, warning, "Ideals can be dangerous if too far removed from the realities of human life." Similarly, The Boston Review published a nuanced review, commenting, "The book is written in a friendly, relaxed tone," but adding that his arguments were not "persuasive." They concluded by disagreeing with Tomasi, concluding, "The moral goods of exercising freedom through market activities would be more widely realized under a regime of Rawlsian property-owning democracy than under the sort of minimally regulated capitalism that Tomasi celebrates."

In the peer-reviewed academic journal Critical Review: A Journal of Politics and Society, Mark Pennington, a Professor of Political Economy at King's College, London suggests the book "offers a challenging and innovative case for classical liberalism." In another peer-reviewed academic journal, The Journal of Politics, Eric MacGilvray, a Professor of Political Science at Ohio State University offered a similarly positive review, starting with "I find a lot to praise in Free Market Fairness." He went on to critique Tomasi's use of the word "libertarian" as both pro-free market and "high liberal." Moreover, in The Mises Review, the journal of the libertarian think tank Ludwig von Mises Institute, David Gordon praised the book, adding "every reader of his book will learn a great deal from it."

Critical Symposia on Free Market Fairness have been hosted by "Bleeding Heart Libertarianism", The Journal of Politics, Critical Review, and Res Publica.
