= Herbert Kitschelt =

- Born: June 16, 1955 (age 71)
- Education: University of Cologne (BA); University of Marburg (MA); Bielefeld University (PhD)

Herbert P. Kitschelt (born June 16, 1955) is a political science scholar and George V. Allen Professor of International Relations at Duke University, North Carolina. He was honored with the Johan Skytte Prize in 2025 for his scholarly work.

Kitschelt's key intellectual contribution is arguably his redefinition of the competitive space for political parties in Western Europe. Kitschelt claims that the traditional patterns along which parties competed had progressively shifted to a new pattern of political division: left-libertarian versus right-authoritarian as a result of social changes in advanced capitalist societies. He was also one of the first scholars to systematically study the rise of Green parties in Europe, which he understood as a form of 'left-libertarian' politics.

In the Radical Right in Western Europe, co-authored with Anthony J. McGann, Kitschelt makes a case that the rupture in the links between social-democracy and the working class is what allowed the radical-right in Western Europe to gain popularity among working class voters.

With co-authors, he has also explained the rise of the new radical right parties in Europe, in light of this shift and studied the formation of party systems in post-communist democracies. In respect to Eastern Europe, Kitschelt argues that patterns of party competition in post-communist states - and the extent to which they are structured in programmatic (as opposed to clientelistic) terms- are produced by legacies of different forms of communist rule, which in turn reflect pre-communist social and state structures. Kitschelt and his co-authors accept, however, that institutional arrangements will start to gain importance over time and may be crucial in strengthening the process of party system development. His more recent writing focuses on issues of party-society links, patronage and clientelism.

== Works ==
Kitschelt's key works are:

- The Logics of Party Formation: Ecological Politics in Belgium and Germany (Cornell University Press, 1989)
- The Transformation of European Social Democracy (Cambridge University Press, 1994)
- The Radical Right in Western Europe: A Comparative Analysis (University of Michigan Press, 1995) in collaboration with Anthony J. McGann;
- H. P. Kitschelt, Zdenka Mansfeldova, Radoslav Markowski and Gabor Toka, Post-Communist Party Systems, Competition, Representation, and Inter-Party Cooperation (Cambridge University Press, 1999)
- Linkages between Citizens and Politicians in Democratic Polities (Comparative Political Studies, 2000)
- Patrons or Policies? Patterns of Democratic Accountability and Political Competition, co-edited with Steven Wilkinson (Cambridge University Press, 2006).
