= Peter Vallentyne =

American philosopher

- Born: March 25, 1952 (age 74); New Haven, Connecticut, U.S.

Education
- Education: McGill University; University of Pittsburgh
- Doctoral advisor: David Gauthier

Philosophical work
- Era: Contemporary philosophy
- Region: Western philosophy
- School: Analytic; Left-libertarianism
- Institutions: University of Missouri
- Main interests: Ethics, political philosophy
- Notable ideas: Left-libertarianism based on equal opportunity for well-being

Peter Vallentyne (/ˈvælənˌtaɪn/; born March 25, 1952) is an American philosopher who is Florence G. Kline Professor of Philosophy at the University of Missouri in Columbia, Missouri. He holds dual citizenship in the United States and Canada.

== Biography ==
Vallentyne received his B.A. from McGill University in 1978 and his Ph.D. from the University of Pittsburgh in 1984, under the direction of David Gauthier and with significant help from Shelly Kagan. He formerly taught at the University of Western Ontario (1984–88) and Virginia Commonwealth University (1988-2003).

Vallentyne has written on a variety of topics in ethical theory and political philosophy, including consequentialism, contractarianism, moral dilemmas, responsibility, equality, self-ownership, liberty, and justice. He defends a version of left-libertarianism based on equal opportunity for well-being.

== Selected bibliography ==
- Vallentyne, Peter (1991). Contractarianism and rational choice: essays on David Gauthier's Morals by agreement. New York: Cambridge University Press. ISBN 9780521398152.
- Vallentyne, Peter; Steiner, Hillel (2000). Left-libertarianism and its critics: the contemporary debate. Houndmills, Basingstoke, Hampshire New York: Palgrave. ISBN 9780312236991.
- Vallentyne, Peter; Steiner, Hillel (2000). The origins of left-libertarianism: an anthology of historical writings. Houndmills New York: St. Martin's Press. ISBN 9780312235918.
- Vallentyne, Peter (2003). Equality and justice (6 volumes). New York: Routledge. ISBN 9780415941426.
