= Carrot and stick =

Metaphor for the use of punishment and reward

The phrase "carrot and stick" is a metaphor for when two different methods of incentivisation are simultaneously employed; the "carrot", referring to the promising and giving of desired rewards in exchange for cooperation; and the "stick", referring to the threat of undesired consequences in response to noncompliance or to compel compliance. In politics, the terms are respectively analogous to the concepts of soft and hard power. A political example of a carrot may be the promise of foreign aid or military support, while the stick may be the threat of military action or imposition of economic sanctions. In Christianity, the concept of Heaven is considered the "carrot" while Hell is the corresponding "stick".

== Origin ==
The earliest English-language references to the "carrot and stick" come from authors in the mid-19th century who in turn wrote in reference to a caricature or cartoon of the time that depicted a race between donkey riders, with the losing jockey using the strategy of beating his steed with "blackthorn twigs" to urge it forward; meanwhile, the winner of the race has tied a carrot to the end of his stick and simply sits in his saddle relaxing and dangling the carrot in front of his donkey. In fact, in some oral traditions, turnips were used instead of carrots as the donkey's temptation.

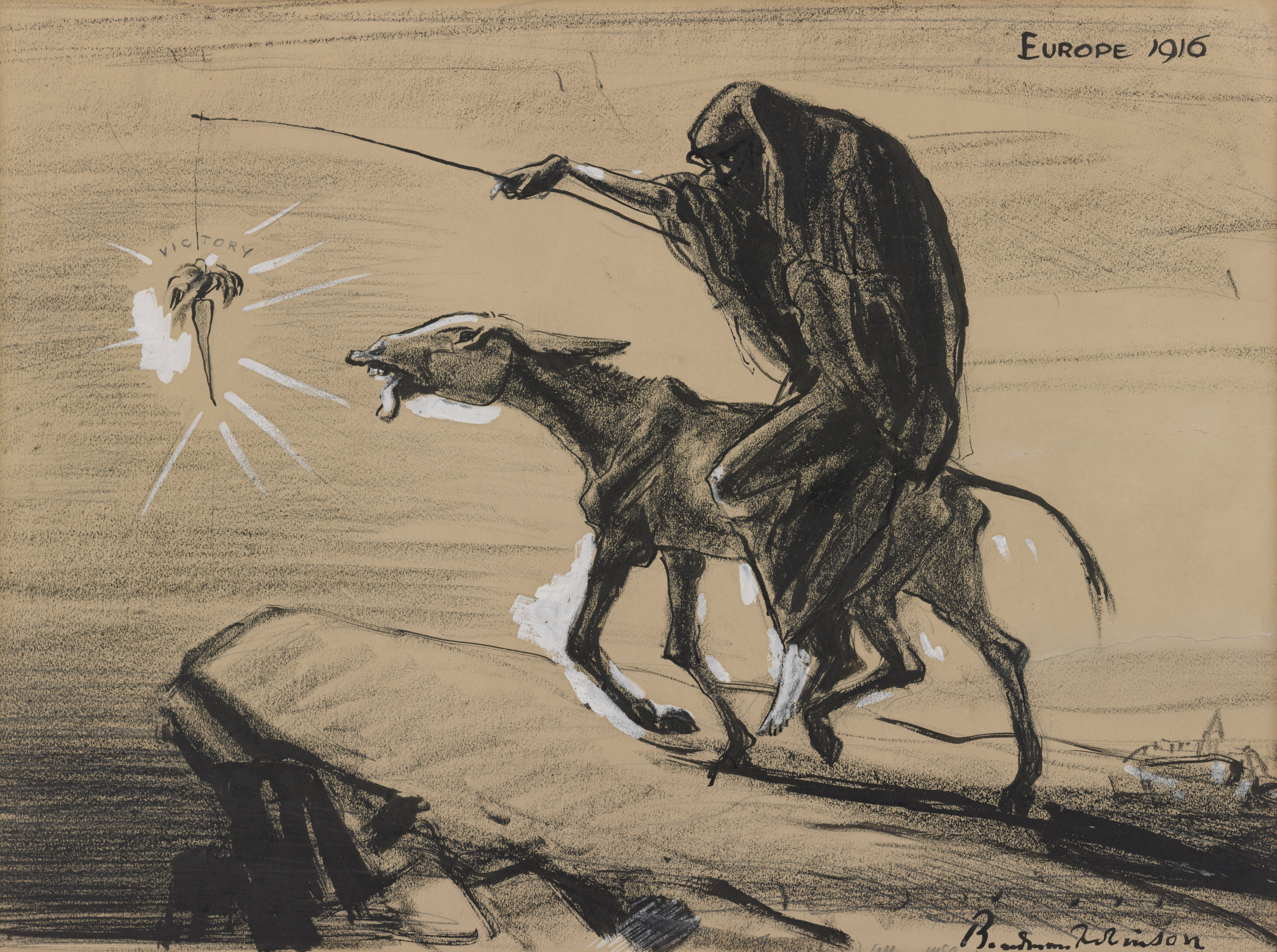
"Europe 1916", an anti-war cartoon by Boardman Robinson, depicting Death enticing an emaciated donkey towards a precipice with a carrot labeled "Victory" at the end of a stick

Decades later, the idea appeared in a letter from Winston Churchill, dated July 6, 1938: "Thus, by every device from the stick to the carrot, the emaciated Austrian donkey is made to pull the Nazi barrow up an ever-steepening hill."

The earliest uses of the idiom in widely available U.S. periodicals were in The Economist's December 11, 1948 issue and in a Daily Republic newspaper article that same year that discussed Russia's economy.

In the German language, as well as Russian and Ukrainian, a related idiom translates as pastry and whip.

In Mexico, president and dictator Porfirio Diaz was known for his pan o palo (bread or stick) policy. While Diaz favored conciliation, he also saw the necessity of violence as an option, epitomized by his statement: "Five fingers or five bullets."

== See also ==
- Aversives, the use of unpleasant stimuli to change behavior
- Operant conditioning, the use of rewards and punishments to change behavior
- Throffer, a combination of a threat and an offer
