= Incentivisation =

Use of rewards as motivation

Incentivisation or incentivization is the practice of building incentives into an arrangement or system in order to motivate the actors within it. It is based on the idea that individuals within such systems can perform better not only when they are coerced but also when they are given rewards.

== Concept ==
Incentivization aims to motivate rather than encourage enthusiasm so that individuals perform better. It is distinguished from a bribery system in the sense that it provides the "spark to motivate, stimulate, move, and encourage workers to strive for a personal best." As a result of this motivation, it is proposed that incentivization can improve the efficiency of different systems. Incentivization follows certain notions proposed by psychological theories such as Self-Determination Theory, which highlights both extrinsic and intrinsic motivation. Incentivization highlights human behavior in response to factors which impact our extrinsic motivation. Extrinsic motivation refers to individuals changing their behavior in order to meet an external goal, or receive praise, approval or monetary rewards. Incentives act as extrinsic motivators, providing external ‘purpose’ to an individual, which has been key to developing a person's psychological health and wellbeing. This is different to intrinsic motivators, which are based on self-interest and are exempt from external pressure. For example, Wikipedia editors have an intrinsic incentive to contribute to the website as there is no financial reward but instead altruism, recognition, and reciprocity.

There are different types of incentives that should be accounted for incentivization strategies. Economic incentives account for the material gains or losses, whereas social incentives account for reputational gains or losses. Psychological/Behavioral incentives refer to “external stimuli, such as a condition or object, that enhance or serve as a motive for behavior.” These are influenced in accordance with Bandura's Social Cognitive Theory. Bandura's theory suggests that we are likely to produce behavior when we are motivated to do so. Incentives are developed through social learning, for example, ‘vicarious reinforcements’, which refers to when an individual observes a ‘role model’ receiving positive reactions to their behavior and ‘reinforce’ why they must replicate this behavior. Vicarious reinforcement involves people developing incentives through empathizing and feeling people's behavior. For example, a student may observe a teacher praising a classmate for exceptional creativity and will be incentivized by that praise to recreate/imitate that behavior. However, while Bandura's theory allows us to draw links between social learning and incentivization, it does not consider ‘human agency’, which suggests that people are consciously able to affect their willingness to engage in behavior. Therefore, biological and cultural explanations are further needed to substantiate this notion.

It is important to understand which type of incentive motivates the target group of an incentivization strategy. For instance, exposure to extrinsic monetary incentives may counteract other incentives/motivations and lead to less overall interest in the task. In cases like this, incentivization backfires.

An incentivization strategy can leverage an existing system of measures to address interrelated issues such as those involving risk, cost, and performance if done correctly.^{7} This can be adopted in multiple fields.

== Biological psychology of incentivization ==
An individual's response to incentivization appears to be controlled by the ventromedial prefrontal cortex. The brain can express a decreased response to incentivization after experiencing damage to or near the nucleus accumbens. However, people may become more sensitive to incentives when there is damage to the subgenual ventromedial prefrontal cortex.

The biological approach to incentivization is linked to biological explanations regarding human extrinsic motivation, emotion and learning signals. Firstly, we can attribute the majority of learning signals to mechanisms occurring within the visceral body. Through an evolutionary lens, it is known that human beings developed brain mechanisms that alter the direct functions of the visceral body.

An example of this is the Hypothalamus, which slows down metabolism in order to maintain ideal homeostatic levels. If this mechanism is weaker in certain individuals, they are more likely to feel a lack of motivation and less affected by incentives. Through maintaining body homeostasis, individuals are able to get through their day feeling less lethargic, bored and distracted. The hypothalamus is linked to the aforementioned nucleus accumbens.

The ventromedial prefrontal cortex regulates the activity of the ‘Amygdala’ within the brain of an individual. The Amygdala is involved in both emotion activation and stimulus/re-enforcement learning. Therefore, people are more likely to consider incentives when their Amygdala is not functioning at an optimal level, as their ability to regulate emotions is limited. This is due to research suggesting that the Amygdala allows for” stimulus re-enforcement association information”, which suggests how likely we are to turn our extrinsic motivators into incentives. Essentially, a change in Amygdala activity impacts our likelihood of undergoing ’Vicarious Reinforcement.’

== Behavioural economics of incentivization ==
Behavioral economics highlights that humans have two cognitive systems. One is automatic and the other is reflective. The reflective system is seen as more rational and/or cognitive. It is more controlled, effortful, rule-following, self-aware and deductive. The reflective system allows us to analyse available information as well as the incentives offered to us to act in their best interests. This contrasts with the automatic system, that takes short-cuts, uses heuristics, and biases. The two systems are also commonly referred to as the 'Fast and Slow' systems of thinking, with the reflective being ‘slow’ and the automatic being ‘fast’. Incentives change behaviour by changing people's minds. Once the possible rewards are highlighted, the reflective system weighs up the revised costs and benefits of our actions and responds accordingly.

== Cultural approach of incentivization ==
Studies have found cultural differences in incentives. Western cultures are more likely to use incentive-based pay (such as commissions) than non-Western cultures. Researchers have also randomized workers across cultures to complete work tasks with piece rates for performance or fixed pay. Across cultures, paying for performance increased effort, but the effect of money was larger in the US and UK than in China, India, Mexico, and South Africa. Similarly, paying students for correct answers on a math test worked in the US, but not China.

These findings fit with Institutional Theory and Hofstede's cultural dimension theories. Some of the most influential cultural factors on adopting incentives include in-group collectivism, performance orientation and uncertainty avoidance. However, the most detailed cultural explanation refers to the ‘individualism vs collectivism’ debate. In certain cultures, individual success is highly valued and sought after, whereas in others, the collective success of the group is prioritized. This may affect the way incentives are framed, received and acted upon. For example, individual prizes as incentives cater towards more individualistic societies, whereas rewards that can be shared amongst an in-group are more suited to collectivist cultures.

Cultural value systems are also important to consider when incentivizing individuals, as certain forms of incentives may be more suited than others. For example, in collectivist cultures, while monetary gains are important, they do not hold as much weight as social reputation within the in-group. Therefore, social incentives such as praise or social status approval may be more beneficial to the individual than receiving funds. Lastly, cultural dimensions may affect how we are motivated by incentives. For example, individualistic societies are likely to be affected more by extrinsic motivators such as recognition as opposed to collectivists, who seek sense of purpose or the fulfillment of learning/achieving goals. However, if we think critically, suggesting one cultural dimension is responsible for incentivization is a far too reductionist statement. Ultimately, it is a combination of Hofstede's cultural dimensions, such as power distance, masculinity and uncertainty, alongside biological and cognitive factors, which explain incentivization.

== The effectiveness of incentivization ==
These factors should be considered when devising or analysing an incentivisation strategy.

=== Framing ===
How an incentive is presented and framed is important. This is known as the choice context and is commonly referred to as the choice architecture. For instance, if in a given context, information is low about how fun a specific task is, by offering a respective amount to complete the task, people might think that the task is unenjoyable and this incentive would fail.

=== Loss aversion ===
We dislike losses more than we like gains of the same value. Individuals respond more strongly to losing something they value than being given a reward of equivalent value. This is known as loss aversion. A weight loss programme asked some participants to deposit money that would be returned to them if targets were met- those that did this lost significantly more weight than those who did not.

=== Human's mental budgeting ===
The importance of context is enhanced as people understand the monetary value of categories (salary, savings, expenses) differently. The same extrinsic incentives create different responses in people, depending on how they understand, value and organise their money.

=== Type and size of incentives ===
The impact also depends on type and size of the incentives. In terms of size- paying a high reward on the successful completion of a task could make the participant anxious about completing the task and reduce their ability to do so. The concept section discusses that economic incentives must be matched with suitable tasks and audiences.

=== Timing and frequency of incentives ===
In terms of timing- the value of rewards may change over time and in different situations, meaning the value of an incentive can too. The frequency of incentives is also important and can impact the effectiveness of incentivisation. Changes in behaviour may reverse back to their original form if one-off incentives are used. This is because they can condition us to behave in the new way only if we are rewarded. If the rewards stop, the new behaviour can also stop.

Incentivisation tends to be more effective at forming permanent habits if they only reward us sometimes. On this note, incentivisation can be likened to operant conditioning, the association of a voluntary behaviour with a consequence. Take the example of someone receiving pocket money. When this money is given at a set specific time, every week for example, or is guaranteed every time a behaviour is expressed, it becomes expected. If money is given only sometimes when the behaviour is expressed, the individual is unsure whether they will receive a reward, which makes performing the behaviour more exciting- like gambling. This is why incentivisation can be more effective when rewards are random.

=== Overemphasis of small probabilities ===
People overemphasise small probabilities which means incentives may be skewed and based upon unrealistic expectations.

=== Payoff timing ===
We prefer immediate payoffs rather than distant ones, even if the immediate payoffs are smaller than the distant ones. People would rather avoid the short-term pain of diabetes blood test rather than the long-term health gain.

== Criticisms ==
The incentive theory of motivation (incentivization) is criticized by psychologists for not being able to explain when individuals carry out behaviors despite their being little to no incentive to do so. For example, a worker who works extremely hard but for a small salary. It also fails to explain situations whereby instead of an incentive, there is rather a threat in place, for example, going outside during a natural disaster in order to help others.

Secondly, incentivization assumes that at any given point, an individual will be entirely extrinsically motivated, or if they do not react to incentives, entirely intrinsically motivated. It does not consider the cases where individuals are engaging with both extrinsic and intrinsic motivators. Developmental psychology can account for the complexities behind human motivation. For example, literature has shown that children are far more likely to be extrinsically motivated at young ages, therefore it is fair to assume that incentives are less appealing as intrinsic motivation develops over time. The repercussions of not considering a developmental focus are that the theory of incentivization is reductionist and lacks the ability to be extrapolated to a wide range of age groups, occupational groups and cultural demographics. Certain psychological theories counter incentive motivation, such as Skinner's theory of learning (1969), which argues that an individual's behavior is directly linked to their external environment, making it difficult to envision an incentivized individual within that framework.

== See also ==
- Reward system
