= Lecherous millionaire =

The lecherous millionaire is a thought experiment devised by Joel Feinberg to illustrate questions concerning coercion. It presents a scenario in which a millionaire offers to pay for medical care for a woman's ill child on the condition that she has sexual relations with him. It is arguable that the millionaire is coercing the woman: from the woman's point of view, the millionaire's offer is equivalent to 'sleep with me or your child dies', which is on par with the millionaire pointing a gun at the child while demanding sexual favors. On the other hand, the millionaire's offer increases the woman's options without removing any of her pre-existing options, giving her increased freedom of choice; this is arguably not coercive.

== See also ==
- Throffer
- Indecent Proposal
