= Throffer =

In political philosophy, a type of proposal

In political philosophy, a throffer is a proposal (also called an intervention (Note: Offers, threats and throffers are "interventions, by others, in individuals' practical deliberations".)) that mixes an offer with a threat which will be carried out if the offer is not accepted. The term was first used in print by political philosopher Hillel Steiner; while other writers followed, it has not been universally adopted and it is sometimes considered synonymous with carrot and stick. Though the threatening aspect of a throffer need not be obvious, or even articulated at all, an overt example is: "Kill this man and receive £100; fail to kill him and I'll kill you."

Steiner differentiated offers, threats and throffers based on the preferability of compliance and noncompliance for the subject when compared to the normal course of events that would have come about were no intervention made. Steiner's account was criticised by philosopher Robert Stevens, who instead suggested that what was important in differentiating the kinds of intervention was whether performing or not performing the requested action was more or less preferable than it would have been were no intervention made. Throffers form part of the wider moral and political considerations of coercion, and form part of the question of the possibility of coercive offers. Contrary to received wisdom that only threats can be coercive, throffers lacking explicit threats have been cited as an example of coercive offers, while some writers argue that offers, threats and throffers may all be coercive if certain conditions are met. For others, by contrast, if a throffer is coercive, it is explicitly the threat aspect that makes it so, and not all throffers can be considered coercive.

The theoretical concerns surrounding throffers have been practically applied concerning workfare programmes. In such systems, individuals receiving social welfare have their aid decreased if they refuse the offer of work or education. Robert Goodin criticised workfare programmes which presented throffers to individuals receiving welfare, and was responded to by Daniel Shapiro, who found his objections unconvincing. Several writers have also observed that throffers presented to people convicted of crimes, particularly sex offenders, can result in more lenient sentences if they accept medical treatment. Other examples are offered by psychiatrist Julio Arboleda-Flórez, who presents concerns about throffers in community psychiatry, and management expert John J. Clancey, who talks about throffers in employment.

== Origin and usage ==
The term throffer is a portmanteau of threat and offer. It was first used by Canadian philosopher Hillel Steiner in a 1974–75 Proceedings of the Aristotelian Society article. Steiner had considered a quote from the 1972 film The Godfather: "I'm gonna make him an offer he can't refuse". While the line seemed to be amusingly ironic (because a threat is being made, not an offer), Steiner was unsatisfied that the difference between an offer and a threat was merely that one promises to confer a benefit and the other a penalty. He thus coined throffer to describe the "offer" in The Godfather. One prominent thinker who adopted the term was political scientist Michael Taylor, and his work on throffers has been frequently cited.

Throffer has not, however, been universally adopted; Michael R. Rhodes notes that there has been some controversy in the literature on whether to use throffer, citing a number of writers, including Lawrence A. Alexander, David Zimmerman and Daniel Lyons, who do not use the term. Some, including political scientists Deiniol Jones and Andrew Rigby, consider throffer to be synonymous with carrot and stick, an idiom which refers to the way a donkey is offered a carrot to encourage compliance, while noncompliance is punished with a stick. Other writers, while electing to use the word, consider it a poor one. For instance, literary scholar Daniel Shore calls it "a somewhat unfortunate term", while using it in his analysis of John Milton's Paradise Regained.

== Definitions ==
In addition to Steiner's original account of throffers, other authors have suggested definitions and ideas on how to differentiate throffers from threats and offers.

=== Steiner's account ===
In the article that introduces the term throffer, Steiner considers the difference between interventions in the form of a threat and those in the form of an offer. He concludes that the distinction is based on how the consequences of compliance or noncompliance differ for the subject of the intervention when compared with "the norm". Steiner observes that a concept of "normalcy" is presupposed in literature on coercion, as changes in well-being for the subject of an intervention are not merely relative, but absolute; any possibility of an absolute change requires a standard, and this standard is "the description of the normal and predictable course of events, that is, the course of events which would confront the recipient of the intervention were the intervention not to occur".

For an offer, such as "you may use my car whenever you like", the consequence of compliance "represents a situation which is preferred to the norm". Noncompliance, that is, not taking up the offer of the use of the car, is identical to the norm, and so neither more nor less preferable. Threats, on the other hand, are characterised by compliance that leads to an outcome less preferable to the norm, with noncompliance leading to an outcome less desirable still. For instance, if someone is threatened with "your money or your life", compliance would lead to them losing their money, while noncompliance would lead to them losing their life. Both are less desirable than the norm (that is, not being threatened at all), but, for the subject of the threat, losing money is more desirable than being killed. A throffer is a third kind of intervention. It differs from both a threat and an offer, as compliance is preferable to the norm, while noncompliance is less preferable than the norm.

For Steiner, all of offers, threats and throffers affect the practical deliberations of their recipient in the same way. What is significant for the subject of the intervention is not the extent to which the consequences of compliance or noncompliance differ in desirability from the norm, but the extent to which they differ in desirability from each other. Thus, an offer does not necessarily exert less influence on its recipient than a threat. The strength of the force exerted by an intervention depends upon the difference in desirability between compliance and noncompliance alone, regardless of the manner of the intervention.

=== Stevens's account ===
Responding to Steiner, Robert Stevens provides examples of what he categorises variously as offers, threats and throffers that fail to meet Steiner's definitions. He gives an example of an intervention he considers a throffer, as opposed to a threat, but in which both compliance and noncompliance are less preferable to the norm. The example is that of someone who makes the demand "either you accept my offer of a handful of beans for your cow, or I kill you". For the subject, keeping the cow is preferred to both compliance and noncompliance with the throffer. Using this and other examples, Stevens argued that Steiner's account of differentiating the three kinds of interventions is incorrect.

In its place, Stevens suggests that determining whether an intervention is a throffer depends not on the desirability of compliance and noncompliance when compared to the norm, but on the desirability of the actions entailed in compliance or noncompliance when compared with what their desirability would have been were no intervention made. He proposes that a throffer is made if P attempts to encourage Q to do A by increasing "the desirability to Q of Q doing A relative to what it would have been if P made no proposal and decrease the desirability to Q of Q doing not-A relative to what it would have been if P made no proposal". An offer, by contrast, increases the desirability to Q of Q doing A compared to how it would have been without P's intervention, leaving the desirability to Q of Q doing not-A as it would have been. A threat decreases the desirability to Q of Q doing not-A compared to what it would have been without P's intervention, while leaving the desirability to Q of Q doing A as it would have been.

Stevens's account of P's attempts to motivate Q to do A
P's intervention is a(n)...	...if P believes that Q feels...	
P's intervention is a(n)...	...doing A after the intervention...	...not doing A after the intervention...
...offer...	...is more preferable than before.	...is equally preferable to before.
...threat...	...is equally preferable to before.	...is less preferable than before.
...throffer...	...is more preferable than before.	...is less preferable than before.

=== Kristjánsson's account ===
Political philosopher Kristján Kristjánsson differentiates threats and offers by explaining that the former is a proposal that creates an obstacle, while the latter is one kind of proposal (another example being a request) that does not. He also draws a distinction between tentative proposals and final proposals, which he feels earlier authors ignored. A tentative proposal does not logically create any kind of obstacle for its subject, and, as such, is an offer. For instance, "if you fetch the paper for me, you'll get candy" is a tentative proposal, as it does not logically entail that a failure to fetch the paper will result in no candy; it is possible that candy can be acquired by another route. In other words, if the subject fetches the paper, then they get candy. By contrast, if the proposal was a final proposal, it would take the form of "if and only if you fetch the paper for me, you'll get candy". This entails that candy can only be acquired if the subject fetches the paper, and no other way. For Kristjánsson, this kind of final proposal constitutes a throffer. There is an offer to fetch the paper ("if"), and a threat that candy can only be acquired through this route ("only if"). As such, an obstacle has been placed on the route of acquiring candy.

Previous authors (Kristjánsson cites Joel Feinberg, Alan Wertheimer and Robert Nozick) provided moral and statistical analyses of various thought experiments to determine whether the proposals they involve are threats or offers. On Kristjánsson's account, by contrast, all of the thought experiments considered are throffers. Instead, he argues, the previous thinkers' analyses attempted to differentiate offers that limit freedom from those that do not. They conflate two tasks, that of differentiating threats and offers and that of differentiating freedom-restricting threats from non-freedom-restricting threats. He concludes that the thinkers' methods are also inadequate for determining the difference between freedom-restricting and non-freedom-restricting threats, for which a test of moral responsibility would be required.

=== Rhodes's account ===
Political philosopher and legal theorist Michael R. Rhodes offers an account of threats, offers and throffers based upon the perception of the subject of the proposal (and, in the case of proposals from agents as opposed to nature, the perception of the agent making the proposal.) Rhodes presents seven different motivational-want-structures, that is, seven reasons why P may want to do what leads to B:

1. W_{1} (intrinsic-attainment-want): "B is wanted in and of itself; B is perceived by P with immediate approbation; B is valued in and of itself by P."
2. W_{2} (extrinsic-attainment-want): "B is perceived by P as a means to E where E is an intrinsic-attainment-want."
3. W_{3} (compound-attainment-want): "B is both an intrinsic-attainment-want and an extrinsic-attainment-want; B is both W_{1} and W_{2}."
4. W_{4} (extrinsic-avoidance-want): "B is perceived by P as a means of avoiding F where F is perceived by P with immediate disapprobation (F is feared by, or F is threatening to, P)."
5. W_{5} (complex-want-type-A): "B is both W_{1} and W_{4}."
6. W_{6} (complex-want-type-B): "B is both W_{2} and W_{4}."
7. W_{7} (complex-want-type-C): "B is both W_{3} and W_{4}."

Proposals that motivate P to act because of W_{1}, W_{2} or W_{3} represent offers. Those that do so because of W_{4} represent threats. Rhodes notes that offers and threats are asymmetrical: while an offer requires only a slight approbation, a high degree of disapprobation is required before a proposal can be called a threat. The disapprobation must be high enough to provoke the "perception of a threat and correlative sense of fear". Rhodes labels as throffers those proposals that motivate P to act because of W_{5}, W_{6} or W_{7}, but notes that the name is not universally used.

For Rhodes, throffers can not merely be biconditional proposals. If Q proposes that P pay $10,000 so that Q withholds information that would lead to P's arrest, then despite the fact that the proposal is biconditional (that is, P may choose to pay or not pay, which would lead to different outcomes) it is not a throffer. This is because choosing to pay cannot be considered attractive for P independent of Q's proposal. P's paying of Q does not lead to the satisfaction of an attainment-want, which is a necessary condition for a proposal's being an offer under Rhodes's account. The exception to this is when an agent offers to help another overcome a background threat (a threat that was not introduced by the proposal). Biconditionals, in addition to either threats or offers, may contain neutral proposals, and so not be throffers. The possibility of another agent's not acting is necessarily neutral. Throffers are those biconditional proposals that contain both a threat and an offer, as opposed to biconditional proposals containing a threat and neutral proposal, or an offer and a neutral proposal. In the case of throffers, it is always going to be difficult or even impossible to determine whether an agent acts on the threatening aspect of the proposal or the offer.

== Throffers and coercion ==
Consideration of throffers forms part of the wider question of coercion and, specifically, the possibility of a coercive offer. Determining whether throffers are coercive, and, if so, to what extent, is difficult. The traditional assumption is that offers cannot be coercive, only threats can, but throffers can challenge this. The threatening aspect of a throffer need not be explicit, as it was in Steiner's examples. Instead, a throffer may take the form of an offer, but carry an implied threat. Philosopher John Kleinig sees a throffer as an example of an occasion when an offer alone may be considered coercive. Another example of a coercive offer may be when the situation in which the offer is made is already unacceptable; for instance, if a factory owner takes advantage of a poor economic environment to offer workers an unfair wage. For Jonathan Riley, a liberal society has a duty to protect its citizens from coercion, whether that coercion comes from a threat, offer, throffer or some other source. "If other persons ... attempt to frustrate the right-holder's wants, then a liberal society must take steps to prevent this, by law if necessary. All exercises of power by others to frustrate the relevant individual or group preferences constitute unwarranted 'interference' with liberty in purely private matters."

Ian Hunt concurs that offers may be considered coercive, and claims that, whatever form the interventions take, they may be considered coercive "when they are socially corrigible influences over action that diminish an agent's freedom overall". He accepts that a possible objection to his claim is that at least some coercive offers do seemingly increase the freedom of their recipients. For instance, in the thought experiment of the lecherous millionaire, a millionaire offers a mother money for treatment for her son's life-threatening illness in exchange for her becoming the millionaire's mistress. Joel Feinberg considers the offer coercive, but in offering a possibility of treatment, the millionaire has increased the options available to the mother, and thus her freedom. For Hunt, Feinberg "overlooks the fact that the millionaire's offer opens the option of [the mother] saving her child on condition that the option of not being [the millionaire's] mistress is closed". Hunt does not see the mother as more free; "while it is clear that she has a greater capacity to pursue her interests as a parent once the offer has been made, and to that extent can be regarded as freer, it is clear also that her capacity to pursue her sexual interests may have been diminished." Every coercive proposal, whether threat, offer or throffer, according to Hunt, contains a simultaneous loss and gain of freedom. Kristjánsson, by contrast, argues that Feinberg's account of "coercive offers" is flawed because these are not offers at all, but throffers.

Peter Westen and H. L. A. Hart argue that throffers are not always coercive, and, when they are, it is specifically the threat that makes them so. For a throffer to be coercive, they claim, the threat must meet three further conditions; firstly, the person making the throffer "must be intentionally bringing the threat to bear on X in order that X do something, Z_{1}", secondly, the person making the throffer must know that "X would not otherwise do or wish to be constrained to do" Z_{1}, and, thirdly, the threat part of the throffer must render "X's option of doing Z_{1} more eligible in X's eyes than it would otherwise be". As such, for the authors, there is the possibility of non-coercive throffers. The pair present three possible examples. Firstly, when the threat aspect of the throffer is a joke; secondly, when the offer aspect is already so desirable to the subject that the threat does not affect their decision-making; or, thirdly, when the subject mistakenly believes the threat immaterial because of the attractiveness of the offer. Rhodes similarly concludes that if a throffer is coercive, it is because of the threatening aspect. For him, the question is "whether one regards the threat component of a throffer as both a necessary and sufficient condition of the performance of a behaviour". He argues that if the offer without the threat would have been enough for the agent subject to the proposal to act, then the proposal is not coercive. However, if both offer and threat aspects of the throffer are motivating factors, then it is tricky to determine whether the agent subject to the proposal was coerced. He suggests that differentiating between "pure coercion" and "partial coercion" may help solve this problem, and that the question of coercion in these cases is one of degree.

== Practical examples ==
The conceptual issues around throffers are practically applied in studies in a number of areas, but the term is also used outside of academia. For instance, it has seen use in British policing and in British courts.

=== Workfare ===
Conceptual thinking about throffers is practically applied in considerations of conditional aid, such as is used in workfare systems. For philosopher and political theorist Gertrude Ezorsky, the denial of welfare when subjects refuse work is the epitome of a throffer. Conditional welfare is also labelled a throffer by political philosopher Robert Goodin. In the words of Daniel Shapiro, also a political philosopher, the offer aspect of workfare is seen in the "benefits one receives if one learns new skills, gets a job, alters destructive behaviors and the like", while the threat aspect is executed with "the elimination or reduction of aid, if the person does not, after a certain period of time, accept the offer". For Goodin, the moral questionability of the threat aspect of a throffer is generally mitigated by the attractiveness of the offer aspect. In this way, workfare can represent a "genuine" throffer, but only when a person receiving welfare payments does not need the payments to survive, and so possesses a genuine choice as to whether to accept the throffer. When, however, an individual would be unable to survive if he or she stopped receiving welfare payments, there is no genuine choice; the individual is, for Goodin, unable to refuse the throffer. This cancels out the morally mitigating factor usually possessed by a throffer. This is presented as an argument against workfare, and Goodin anticipates that advocates would respond paternalistically by claiming that, regardless of issues of freedom, the individual in question would benefit from taking part in the work or education offered.

Shapiro responds to Goodin's argument by challenging his factual assumption that individuals would starve if they refused the workfare throffer. In state-sponsored (see welfare state) workfare systems, he claims, only monetary assistance is eliminated by a refusal to accept the throffer, while in private systems (that is, non-state charities or organisations offering conditional aid), other groups than the one operating a workfare system exist. In either system, recipients of welfare may also turn to family and friends for help. For these reasons, he does not consider the throffer to be unrefusable in the cases in which Goodin believes it is. A second (and, Shapiro claims, more important) objection is also presented. State welfare without sanctions fails to mirror the way that working individuals who do not rely on welfare payments take responsibility for their lives. If a person who works stops working, Shapiro observes, then they will typically find their economic situation worsened. Unconditional state welfare does not reflect this, and instead reflects the unusual position of the person who would be no worse off if they refused to work. As unconditional welfare does not mirror the situation of ordinary workers, it is unable to determine whether or not people are willing to take responsibility for their lives.

For Ivar Lødemel and Heather Trickey, editors of 'An Offer You Can't Refuse': Workfare in International Perspective, workfare programmes' reliance on compulsion makes them throffers. Citing the Danish model as a particular example, the pair argue that workfare involves the use of compulsory offers; while the work or education is presented as an offer, because recipients of welfare are dependent upon the help they would lose if they refuse the offer, they effectively have no choice. The compulsive aspect reveals that at least some recipients of welfare, in the eyes of policy makers, require coercion before they will accept offers of work. Neither the chance of paid work nor participation in labour schemes are, alone, enough to encourage some to freely accept the offers they receive. Such compulsion serves to reintegrate people into the labour market, and serves as a kind of "new paternalism". The authors are concerned about this compulsion, and present several arguments against it which are possible or have been utilised in the literature: Firstly, it impacts the rights of those against whom it is used. This may make it objectionable in and of itself, or it may result in undesirable outcomes. Secondly, it can be argued that benefits must be unconditional in order to act as a genuine safety net. Thirdly, compulsion undermines consumer feedback, and so no differentiation can be made between good and poor programmes presented to those receiving welfare. Fourthly, such coercion may contribute to a culture of resistance among those receiving welfare.

=== Prisoners and mental health ===
Forensic psychologist Eric Cullen and prison governor Tim Newell claim that prisoners face a throffer once they are told that they must acknowledge their guilt before they are offered parole or moved to an open prison. Cullen and Newell cite the example of a prisoner who falsely admitted guilt to move to an open prison; once there, however, he felt he could no longer lie about his guilt, and confessed to the prison's governor. He was subsequently transferred back to a maximum security prison. In the case of sex offenders, a throffer is presented when they are offered release if they take up treatment, but are threatened with extended sentences if they do not. Cullen and Newell are concerned about the predicament that these throffers present to prisoners, including those found innocent on appeal. Concerns surrounding throffers proposed to convicted sex offenders have also been discussed in print by Alex Alexandrowicz, himself wrongly imprisoned, and criminologist David Wilson. The latter observed the difficulties for those innocent people wrongly imprisoned who are faced with the throffer of having their sentence shortened if they "acknowledge their guilt", but noted that, as perspectives of prisoners were rarely considered, the problem is usually not visible.

Likewise, therapeutic treatment of non-criminals with mental health problems can be considered in terms of throffers. In community psychiatry, patients with mental health problems will sometimes be presented with the provision of social services, such as financial or housing aid, in exchange for changing their lifestyle and reporting for the administration of medicines. Psychiatrist Julio Arboleda-Flórez considers these throffers a form of social engineering, and worries that they

have multiple implications in regard to coercive mechanisms from implicit curtailments of freedom to ascription of vulnerability. The former would include threats to personal autonomy, instilling fear in regard to a potential loss of freedom, an increase of dependency with mistrust of one's own capabilities to manage the business of living and, hence, an increase of feelings and attitudes of helplessness. The ascription of vulnerability overrides the principle of equality between the partners, constitutes and invasion of privacy and impacts on the positive rights of individuals.

=== Business ===
According to management researcher John J. Clancey, scientific management can involve the use of throffers. While piecework had been utilised since the Middle Ages, Frederick Winslow Taylor blended rationalised management with piecework, to create a new system. Productivity processes were standardised, after which point managers were able to present a throffer to workers: higher pay was offered if they were able to exceed the standard, while lower pay was threatened for any who did not meet expectations.

== See also ==
- Extortion
