= Timothy Gorringe =

English Anglican priest and theologian (born 1946)

The Reverend Timothy Gorringe
- Born: Timothy Jervis Gorringe; 1946 (age 79–80)
- Other name: Tim Gorringe

Ecclesiastical career
- Religion: Christianity (Anglican)
- Church: Church of England
- Ordained: 1972 (deacon); 1973 (priest)

Academic background
- Education: St Edmund Hall, Oxford; Sarum Theological College
- Influences: Karl Barth; Alan Ecclestone; René Girard; Christopher Hill; Friedrich Schleiermacher; Paul Tillich; Ton Veerkamp

Academic work
- Discipline: Theology
- School or tradition: Christian socialism
- Institutions: St John's College, Oxford; University of St Andrews; University of Exeter
- Main interests: Karl Barth; theology and environmentalism

Timothy Jervis Gorringe (born 1946) is an English Anglican priest and theologian who is St Luke's Professor of Theological Studies at the University of Exeter, Devon, England.

== Life ==
Born in 1946, Timothy Gorringe was educated at St Edmund Hall, Oxford (BA 1969, MPhil 1975), and Sarum Theological College (1969–1972).

He was ordained deacon in 1972 and priest in 1973 and served as assistant curate at Chapel Allerton (1972–1975) and Oxford St Mary the Virgin with St Cross and St Peter (1976–1978). From 1979 until 1986, he taught theology at Tamilnadu Theological Seminary. He was official fellow, chaplain, and tutor in Theology at St John's College, Oxford 1986–1995, reader in Contextual Theology in the University of St Andrews 1995–1998, and became St Luke's Professor of Theological Studies in the University of Exeter in 1998.

His academic interests focus on the interrelations of theology, culture, art, social science, criminal justice, economics, and politics, as well as the theology of Karl Barth.

He is a member of the Iona Community.

His other interests include apiculture, poultry keeping, home winemaking, the theatre, poetry, and political activism.

Currently Gorringe is working on a two-year research project funded by the Arts and Humanities Research Council on "The values of constructive social change", focusing on the transition town movement.

== Publications ==
Gorringe has published many books, including:

- Redeeming Time: Atonement Through Education (Darton Longman Todd, 1986) ISBN 9780232517019
- Discerning Spirit: A Theology of Revelation (SCM, 1990) ISBN 9780334024620
- God's Theatre: A Theology of Providence (SCM, 1991) ISBN 9780334024934
- Capital and the Kingdom: Theological Ethics and Economic Order (Orbis Books, 1994) ISBN 9780281047734
- Alan Ecclestone: Priest as Revolutionary (Cairns, 1994) ISBN 9781870652216
- God's Just Vengeance: Crime, Violence and the Rhetoric of Salvation (CUP, 1996) ISBN 9780521553018
- The Sign of Love: Reflections on the Eucharist (SPCK 1997) ISBN 9780281049967
- Karl Barth: Against Hegemony (OUP, 1999) ISBN 9780198752479
- Fair Shares: Ethics and the Global Economy (Thames & Hudson, 1999)
- Salvation (Epworth, 2000)
- The Education of Desire: Towards a Theology of the Senses (SCM, 2001) ISBN 9781563383731
- A Theology of the Built Environment: Justice, Empowerment, Redemption (CUP, 2002) ISBN 9780521891448
- Furthering Humanity: A Theology of Culture (Ashgate, 2004) (shortlisted for the Michael Ramsey Prize 2005)
- Crime (SCM, 2004)
- Harvest: Food, Farming and the Churches (SPCK, 2006)
- The Common Good and the Global Emergency: God and the Built Environment (CUP, 2011) ISBN 9781107002012
- Earthly Visions: Theology and the Challenges of Art (Yale, 2011) ISBN 9780300162806
- Word, Silence, and the Climate Emergency: God, Ekklesia, and Christian Doctrine (Fortress Academic, 2021) ISBN 9781978711228
