= The Radical Right in Western Europe =

1995 book by Herbert Kitschelt and Anthony J. McGann

The Radical Right in Western Europe: A Comparative Analysis
- Cover of the first edition
- Authors: Herbert Kitschelt; Anthony J. McGann
- Language: English
- Subject: Far-right politics
- Publisher: University of Michigan Press
- Publication date: 1995
- Publication place: United States
- Media type: Print (Hardcover and Paperback)
- Pages: 346
- ISBN: 0-472-10663-5

The Radical Right in Western Europe: A Comparative Analysis is a book written by Herbert Kitschelt in collaboration with Anthony J. McGann. It is a political science study of far right political party experiences in seven countries of Western Europe.

In the book, Kitschelt explores the rise of the new radical right parties in Western Europe. He claims that this phenomenon has taken place due to the shift in the political spectra in these countries. Kitschelt further distinguishes between three forms of new radical right parties: Neo-Fascists, which resemble the old Fascist parties and appeal to workers, NRR, or new radical right such as the Vlaams Belang and the populist parties such as the radical parties of Italy.

It was published by University of Michigan Press in 1995; it was reprinted in paperback in 1997.

== Awards ==
- Winner of the American Political Science Association's 1996 Woodrow Wilson Foundation Award.
