= Cellular democracy =

Subsidiary democratic model

As developed by geolibertarian political economist Fred E. Foldvary, cellular democracy is a model of democracy based on multi-level bottom-up structures in either small neighborhood governmental districts or contractual communities.

== Councils ==
In cellular democracy, a jurisdiction such as a county or city is divided into neighborhood districts, each with a population of about 500 people and about 100 to 200 households. The voters in the district would elect a council. The small size of districts would allow for more informed voters at a smaller cost. Representatives, plus one alternate, would be elected to the council. This would be a "level-1 council." Neighborhood districts would then vote for a "level-2 council." Each level-1 council elects a regular representative and an alternate to the level-2 council from its own regular membership.

A further region containing several level-2 councils would comprise a level-3 council, each level-2 council again electing a regular and an alternate representative to level 3. The level-2 representative sent up to the level-3 council would be replaced by their alternative.

The hierarchy would continue indefinitely, depending on the size of the state, or even expanding worldwide.

== Secession ==
Councils could 'secede', creating a new branch of councils that would be incorporated back into the system.

== Taxation ==
Each level 1 council would be able to select its source of revenue. Property taxes would be likely, and Foldvary favors the land value tax as the least intrusive option. Every council above council-1 gets its money from the council below it.

== See also ==
- Anti-federalism
- Community land trust
- Confederation
- Decentralization
- Deliberative democracy
- Grassroots democracy
- Libertarian municipalism
- Localism (politics)
- Panchayati raj
- Participatory democracy
- Sociocracy
- Soviet (council)
- Subsidiarity
