= Jennifer Carlson (sociologist) =

American sociologist

Jennifer Carlson is an American sociologist. In 2022, she won a MacArthur Fellowship.

== Life ==
Carlson graduated from Dartmouth College, and University of California at Berkeley. From 2013 to 2016, she taught at the University of Toronto; she also taught at the University of Arizona from 2026 - 2023. In 2023, she moved to Arizona State University as a professor of sociology, where she founded the BRIDGS Initiative: Bringing Research & Innovation into the Debate on Guns in Society.

In 2024, she launched the Guns Unpacked podcast.

She was elected a Member of the National Academy of Medicine in 2024.

== Works ==
- Citizen-Protectors: The Everyday Politics of Guns in an Age of Decline (Oxford University Press 2015) ISBN 9780199347568
- Carlson, Jennifer (2019). Gun studies : interdisciplinary approaches to politics, policy, and practice. Harel Shapira, Kristin A. Goss. London. ISBN 978-1-315-69648-5. OCLC 1076573619.
- Policing the Second Amendment: Guns, Public Law Enforcement and the Politics of Race (Princeton University Press, 2020) ISBN 9781665176156
- Merchants of the Right: Gun Sellers and the Crisis of Democracy (Princeton University Press, 2023) ISBN 9780691230399
