= Hillel Steiner =

Canadian political philosopher (born 1942)

Hillel Steiner FBA
- Born: Hillel Isaac Steiner; 1942 (age 83–84)

Education
- Education: University of Toronto

Philosophical work
- Era: Contemporary philosophy
- Region: Western philosophy
- School: Analytic; Left-libertarianism
- Institutions: University of Toronto; University of Manchester
- Main interests: Political philosophy
- Notable ideas: Equal rights to natural resources

Hillel Isaac Steiner (/ˈstaɪnər/; born 1942) is a Canadian political philosopher and is emeritus Professor of Political Philosophy at the University of Manchester. He was elected to the Fellowship of the British Academy in 1999.

== Work ==
Steiner's writings are focused on contemporary philosophical work on the conceptual analysis of freedom, rights and justice, and on the relation between moral and economic rationality. His most noted work is An Essay on Rights which won the Political Studies Association's best book prize for 1994. In it, he develops what has since come to be known as a left-libertarian theory of distributive justice. This book brings together Steiner's work on the pure negative conception of liberty, his will theory of rights, and a liberal model of exploitation. Embracing the libertarian right of self-ownership, he argues that its consistent universalization requires that individuals be vested with equal rights to negative freedom that are global in scope and that take account of interpersonal inequalities in the value of natural resources, including those of genetic endowments. He was also the first person to use the term "throffer", which is now used in and beyond political philosophy, in print.

He is a member of the following organisations: American Philosophical Association, Aristotelian Society, Association for Legal and Social Philosophy, Basic Income Earth Network, British Philosophical Association, European Society for the History of Economic Thought, Political Studies Association, Society for Applied Philosophy, and the September Group.

== Writings ==
- Steiner, Willel (2018). "Part IV: What Is the Role of the State?; Ch. 31: Free Markets and Exploitation". In Brennan, Jason; van der Vossen, Bas; Schmidtz, David (eds.). The Routledge Handbook of Libertarianism. London and New York: Taylor & Francis Group. pp. 436–446. ISBN 978-0367870591.
