= Grassroots democracy =

Type that favors individual activism

Grassroots democracy is a tendency towards designing political processes that shift as much decision-making authority as practical to the organization's lowest geographic or social level of organization.

Grassroots organizations can have a variety of structures; depending on the type of organization and what the members want. These can be non-structured and non-hierarchical organizations that are run by all members, or by whichever member wishes to do something.

To cite a specific hypothetical example, a national grassroots organization would place as much decision-making power as possible in the hands of local chapters or common members instead of the head office. The principle is that for democratic power to be best exercised it must be vested in a local community and common members instead of isolated, atomized individuals, at the top of the organization. Grassroots organizations can inhabit participatory systems. Grassroots systems differ from representative systems that allow local communities or national memberships to elect representatives who then go on to make decisions.

The difference among the three systems comes down to where they rest on two different axes: the rootedness in a community (grassroots versus national or international); and the ability of all individuals to participate in the shared decision-making process (participatory versus representative).

== As an economic system ==
Grassroots democracy is a key component of libertarian socialist political philosophies, which, for various reasons, advocate putting firms under the control of local communities or councils. For example, eco-socialists argue that firms should be controlled by the group of people whose ecosystem is directly affected by that firm's activity. Meanwhile, Anarchists view contemporary forms of employment as examples of unjust and unnecessary forms of hierarchy and centralization. Finally, Libertarian Marxists view history as a struggle between various social groups where the inclusive nature of a grassroots economy will enable new socioeconomic groups to emerge such that these struggles will abate, thereby, improving the human condition.

== See also ==
- Anarchism
- Libertarian socialism
- Popular assembly
- Cell church
- Cellular democracy
- Community organizing
- Decentralisation
- Direct democracy
- Eco-socialism
- Social ecology
- Democratic confederalism
- International Simultaneous Policy Organization
- Libertarian municipalism
- Localism (politics)
- Open source governance
- Subsidiarity
- Workplace democracy
